= 2025 New Brunswick Women's Curling Championship =

Canadian provincial women's curling championship

- Host city: Saint Andrews, New Brunswick
- Arena: Heather Curling Club
- Dates: January 15–18
- Winner: Team Adams
- Curling club: Capital WC, Fredericton
- Skip: Melissa Adams
- Third: Jaclyn Crandall
- Second: Kayla Russell
- Lead: Kendra Lister
- Alternate: Molli Ward
- Coach: Alex Robichaud

The 2025 New Brunswick Women's Curling Championship, the provincial women's curling championship for New Brunswick, was held from January 15 to 18 at the Heather Curling Club in Saint Andrews, New Brunswick. The winning Melissa Adams rink represented New Brunswick at the 2025 Scotties Tournament of Hearts in Thunder Bay, Ontario.

== Teams ==
The teams are listed as follows:

Skip	Third	Second	Lead	Alternate	Coach	Club
Melissa Adams	Jaclyn Crandall	Kayla Russell	Kendra Lister	Molli Ward	Alex Robichaud	Capital WC, Fredericton
Nicole Arsenault-Bishop	Natalie Hearn	Lynn LeBlanc	Taryn Abernethy	Krista Flanagan		Curl Moncton, Moncton
Justine Comeau	Carly A. Smith	Samantha Cook	Meghan Beland	Kate Callaghan	Tim Comeau	Capital WC, Fredericton
Mélodie Forsythe	Rebecca Watson	Carly L. Smith	Mya Pugsley	Jenna Campbell	Wayne Tallon; Lorna Campbell	Curl Moncton, Moncton
Sarah Gaines	Shaelyn Park	Hanna Williams	Ashley Coughlan			Gage G&CC, Oromocto
Sarah Mallais	Jocelyn Adams-Moss	Amanda England	Heather MacPhee		Andrew Simpson	Curl Moncton, Moncton
Sylvie Quillian	Jennifer Armstrong	Erin Carmody	Katie Vandenborre		Daryell Nowlan	Curl Moncton, Moncton

== Knockout brackets ==
=== A event ===
First Knockout	Qualifier 1
Sylvie Quillian	7
Mélodie Forsythe	6
Mélodie Forsythe	10
Nicole Arsenault-Bishop	3
Sylvie Quillian	6
Melissa Adams	10
Sarah Mallais	10
Justine Comeau	4
Sarah Mallais	7
Melissa Adams	10
Melissa Adams	8
Sarah Gaines	6

=== B event ===
Second Knockout	Qualifier 2
Nicole Arsenault-Bishop	4
Sarah Mallais	10	Sarah Mallais	3
Sylvie Quillian	9
Justine Comeau	9	Sylvie Quillian	6
Sarah Gaines	5	Justine Comeau	9	Melissa Adams	8
Mélodie Forsythe	8	Justine Comeau	6
Melissa Adams	8

=== C event ===
Third Knockout	Qualifier 3
Mélodie Forsythe	5
Sarah Mallais	7	Sarah Mallais	5
Melissa Adams	7
Sarah Gaines	7	Melissa Adams	8
Nicole Arsenault-Bishop	4	Sarah Gaines	8	Justine Comeau	6
Justine Comeau	10	Justine Comeau	8
Sylvie Quillian	7

== Knockout results ==
All draw times are listed in Atlantic Time (UTC-04:00).

=== Draw 1 ===
Wednesday, January 15, 7:00 pm

Sheet A	1	2	3	4	5	6	7	8	9	10	Final
Mélodie Forsythe	2	0	1	0	1	0	5	1	X	X	10
Nicole Arsenault-Bishop 🔨	0	1	0	1	0	1	0	0	X	X	3

Sheet B	1	2	3	4	5	6	7	8	9	10	Final
Sarah Mallais 🔨	0	1	0	3	0	2	1	1	2	X	10
Justine Comeau	1	0	1	0	2	0	0	0	0	X	4

Sheet C	1	2	3	4	5	6	7	8	9	10	Final
Melissa Adams 🔨	1	1	0	2	0	1	0	0	1	2	8
Sarah Gaines	0	0	3	0	1	0	1	1	0	0	6

=== Draw 2 ===
Thursday, January 16, 9:30 am

Sheet A	1	2	3	4	5	6	7	8	9	10	Final
Sarah Mallais 🔨	1	0	1	3	0	1	0	1	0	0	7
Melissa Adams	0	1	0	0	3	0	2	0	3	1	10

Sheet C	1	2	3	4	5	6	7	8	9	10	Final
Sylvie Quillian	0	2	0	0	1	0	1	1	0	2	7
Mélodie Forsythe 🔨	1	0	1	1	0	1	0	0	2	0	6

=== Draw 3 ===
Thursday, January 16, 2:30 pm

Sheet A	1	2	3	4	5	6	7	8	9	10	Final
Justine Comeau	1	0	1	0	2	3	0	0	2	X	9
Sarah Gaines 🔨	0	1	0	1	0	0	2	1	0	X	5

Sheet B	1	2	3	4	5	6	7	8	9	10	Final
Sylvie Quillian	0	3	0	2	0	0	0	1	0	X	6
Melissa Adams 🔨	1	0	2	0	3	1	2	0	1	X	10

=== Draw 4 ===
Thursday, January 16, 7:30 pm

Sheet B	1	2	3	4	5	6	7	8	9	10	11	Final
Justine Comeau 🔨	0	1	0	3	0	1	0	2	1	0	1	9
Mélodie Forsythe	2	0	2	0	1	0	2	0	0	1	0	8

Sheet C	1	2	3	4	5	6	7	8	9	10	Final
Nicole Arsenault-Bishop	1	0	0	0	2	1	0	0	0	X	4
Sarah Mallais 🔨	0	2	1	1	0	0	2	1	3	X	10

=== Draw 5 ===
Friday, January 17, 2:30 pm

Sheet A	1	2	3	4	5	6	7	8	9	10	Final
Sarah Mallais	0	1	0	0	0	0	2	X	X	X	3
Sylvie Quillian 🔨	0	0	4	2	1	2	0	X	X	X	9

Sheet B	1	2	3	4	5	6	7	8	9	10	Final
Sarah Gaines 🔨	0	1	1	0	1	1	0	1	1	1	7
Nicole Arsenault-Bishop	0	0	0	3	0	0	1	0	0	0	4

Sheet C	1	2	3	4	5	6	7	8	9	10	Final
Justine Comeau	0	1	2	0	1	0	0	2	0	0	6
Melissa Adams 🔨	2	0	0	0	0	2	1	0	1	2	8

=== Draw 6 ===
Friday, January 17, 7:30 pm

Sheet A	1	2	3	4	5	6	7	8	9	10	Final
Sarah Gaines 🔨	0	2	1	0	3	0	1	0	1	0	8
Justine Comeau	1	0	0	2	0	3	0	3	0	1	10

Sheet B	1	2	3	4	5	6	7	8	9	10	Final
Sylvie Quillian	0	0	2	0	2	0	2	0	0	0	6
Melissa Adams 🔨	0	2	0	2	0	1	0	1	1	1	8

Sheet C	1	2	3	4	5	6	7	8	9	10	Final
Mélodie Forsythe	0	2	1	0	0	0	1	1	0	X	5
Sarah Mallais 🔨	1	0	0	2	1	1	0	0	2	X	7

=== Draw 7 ===
Saturday, January 18, 2:30 pm

Sheet A	1	2	3	4	5	6	7	8	9	10	Final
Sarah Mallais	1	0	0	0	1	0	2	0	1	0	5
Melissa Adams 🔨	0	1	1	2	0	1	0	1	0	1	7

Sheet C	1	2	3	4	5	6	7	8	9	10	11	Final
Justine Comeau	0	1	0	1	0	1	0	2	2	0	1	8
Sylvie Quillian 🔨	2	0	1	0	2	0	1	0	0	1	0	7

=== Draw 8 ===
Saturday, January 18, 7:30 pm

Sheet B	1	2	3	4	5	6	7	8	9	10	11	Final
Melissa Adams 🔨	2	0	0	0	1	1	0	2	0	0	2	8
Justine Comeau	0	1	1	0	0	0	2	0	1	1	0	6

== Playoffs ==
- No playoffs were required as the Melissa Adams rink won all three qualifying events.

2025 New Brunswick Women's Curling Championship

Melissa Adams
4th New Brunswick Provincial Championship title
