= Steele Cup Cash =

- Established: 2017
- Host city: Fredericton, New Brunswick
- Arena: Capital Winter Club
- Men's purse: $6,500
- Women's purse: $4,500

Current champions (2025)
- Men: (New Brunswick) James Grattan
- Women: (New Brunswick) Sylvie Quillian

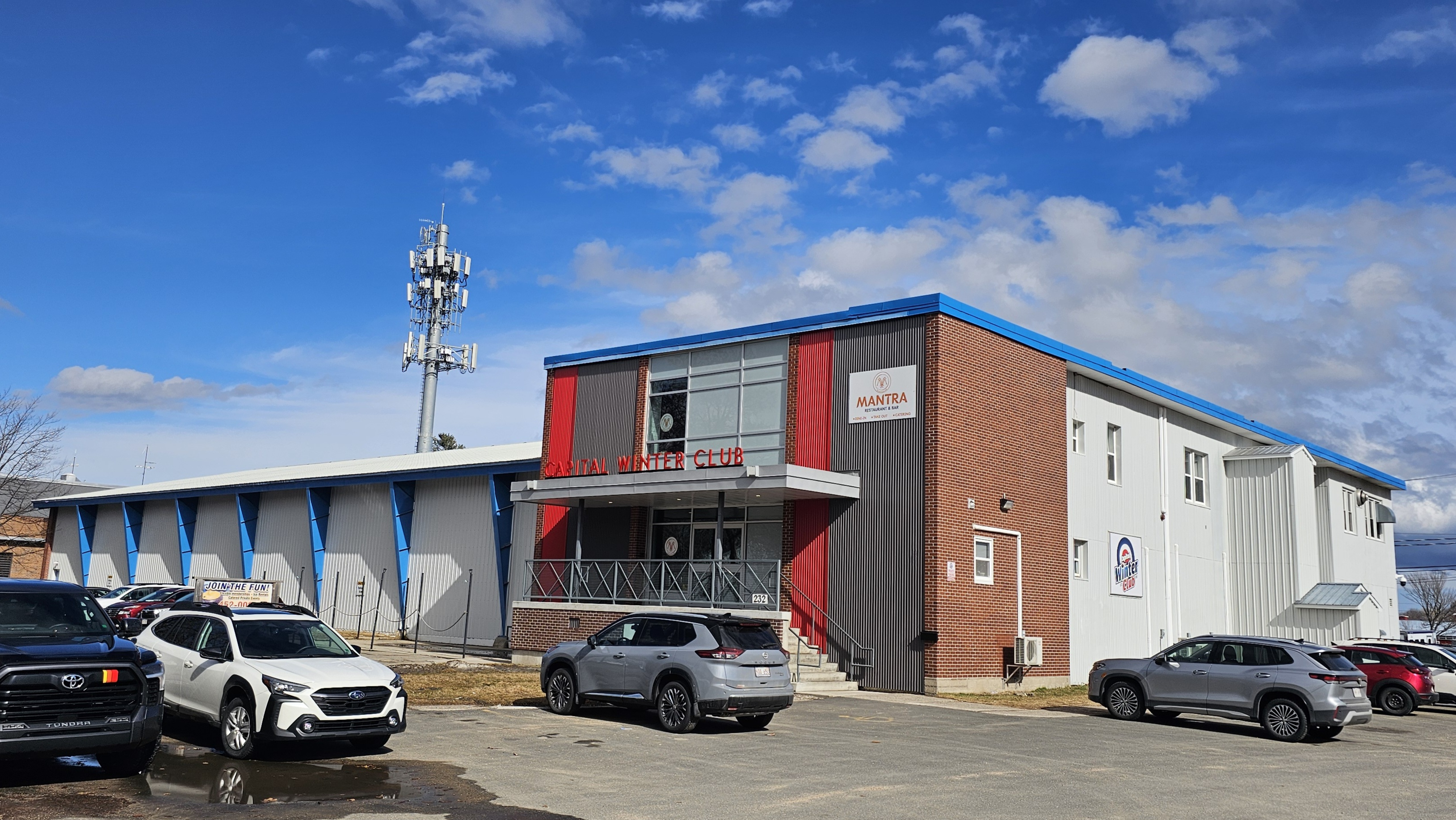
The Capital Winter Club in 2026

The Steele Cup Cash is an annual bonspiel, or curling tournament, held at the Capital Winter Club in Fredericton, New Brunswick. It was part of the Men's and Women's World Curling Tour in 2018 and 2019, and is now just a tour event. The tournament is held in a round robin format.

In 2022 and 2023, the event merged with the Jim Sullivan Curling Classic.

== Past champions ==
=== Men ===
Year	Winner	Runner up	Purse (CAD)
2017	(New Brunswick) Scott Jones, Jamie Brannen, Brian King, Robert Daley	(New Brunswick) Jeremy Mallais, Jason Vaughan, Darren Roach, Jared Bezanson	
2018	(Nova Scotia) Jamie Murphy, Paul Flemming, Scott Saccary, Philip Crowell	(New Brunswick) Rod Aube, Steve Kelly, Dave McCafferty	$6,100
2019	(New Brunswick) Scott Jones, Jeremy Mallais, Brian King, Robert Daley	(Nova Scotia) Jamie Murphy, Paul Flemming, Scott Saccary, Philip Crowell	$5,500
2020	Cancelled		
2021	(New Brunswick) James Grattan, Paul Dobson, Andy McCann, Jamie Brannen	(Nova Scotia) Owen Purcell, Joel Krats, Adam McEachren, Scott Weagle	$5,850
2024	(New Brunswick) James Grattan, Joel Krats, Paul Dobson, Andy McCann	(Nova Scotia) Kendal Thompson, Stuart Thompson, Bryce Everist, Michael Brophy	$6,500
2025	(New Brunswick) James Grattan, Joel Krats, Andy McCann, Noah Riggs	(New Brunswick) Colten Steele, Rene Comeau, Alex Robichaud, Cameron Sallaj	$6,500

=== Women ===
Year	Winner	Runner up	Purse (CAD)
2017	(New Brunswick) Sylvie Robichaud, Melissa Adams, Nicole Arsenault Bishop, Kendra Lister	(New Brunswick) Jennifer Armstrong, Cathlia Ward, Jillian Babin, Katie Forward	
2018	(New Brunswick) Andrea Crawford, Jillian Babin, Jennifer Armstrong, Katie Forward	(New Brunswick) Sylvie Robichaud, Melissa Adams, Nicole Arsenault Bishop, Kendra Lister	$3,200
2019	(New Brunswick) Andrea Crawford, Jennifer Armstrong, Jillian Babin, Katie Forward	(New Brunswick) Sylvie Quillian, Melissa Adams, Nicole Arsenault Bishop, Kendra Lister	$3,000
2020	Cancelled		
2021	(New Brunswick) Mélodie Forsythe, Carly Smith, Deanna MacDonald, Caylee Smith	(New Brunswick) Andrea Crawford, Sylvie Quillian, Justine Comeau, Katie Forward	$3,150
2024	(Nova Scotia) Christina Black, Jill Brothers, Jenn Baxter, Marlee Powers	(New Brunswick) Melissa Adams, Jaclyn Crandall, Kayla Russell, Kendra Lister	$4,800
2025	(New Brunswick) Sylvie Quillian, Sarah Mallais, Lynn LeBlanc, Kate Paterson	(New Brunswick) Andrea Kelly, Jennifer Armstrong, Erin Carmody, Katie Vandenborre	$4,500
