= 2026 New Brunswick Women's Curling Championship =

Canadian provincial women's curling championship

- Host city: Fredericton, New Brunswick
- Arena: Capital Winter Club
- Dates: December 3–7, 2025
- Winner: Team Forsythe
- Curling club: Capital WC, Fredericton
- Skip: Mélodie Forsythe
- Third: Rebecca Watson
- Second: Carly Smith
- Lead: Jenna Campbell
- Finalist: Andrea Kelly

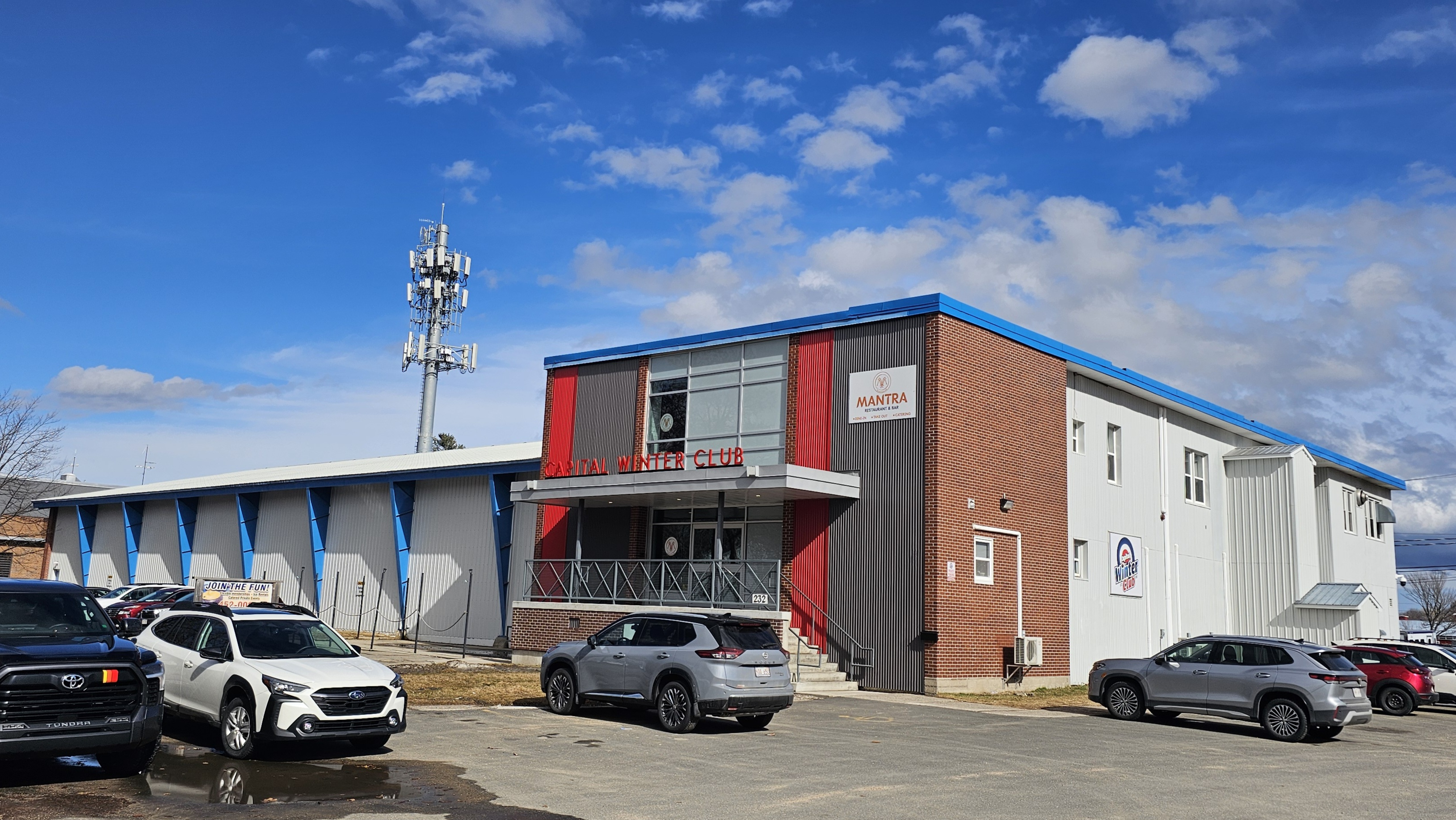
The Capital Winter Club in 2026

The 2026 New Brunswick Women's Curling Championship, the provincial women's curling championship for New Brunswick, was held from December 3 to 7, 2025 at the Capital Winter Club in Fredericton, New Brunswick. The winning Mélodie Forsythe rink will represent New Brunswick at the 2026 Scotties Tournament of Hearts in Mississauga, Ontario.

== Teams ==
The teams are listed as follows:

Skip	Third	Second	Lead	Alternate	Coach	Club
Melissa Adams	Jaclyn Crandall	Cayla Auld	Kendra Lister	Kayla Russell		Capital WC, Fredericton
Mélodie Forsythe	Rebecca Watson	Carly Smith	Jenna Campbell			Capital WC, Fredericton
Andrea Kelly	Jennifer Fenwick	Erin Carmody	Katie Vandenborre		Daryell Nowlan	Capital WC, Fredericton
Sylvie Quillian	Sarah Mallais	Lynn LeBlanc	Kate Paterson		Ellery Robichaud	Curl Moncton, Moncton

== Knockout brackets ==
=== A event ===
First Knockout
Mélodie Forsythe	8
Sylvie Quillian	7
Andrea Kelly	10
Melissa Adams	8

Qualifier 1
Mélodie Forsythe	4
Andrea Kelly	5

=== B event ===
Second Knockout
Sylvie Quillian	4
Andrea Kelly	10
Melissa Adams	4
Mélodie Forsythe	11

Qualifier 2
Andrea Kelly	8
Mélodie Forsythe	2

=== C event ===
Third Knockout
Melissa Adams	2
Andrea Kelly	9
Sylvie Quillian	1
Mélodie Forsythe	9

Qualifier 3
Andrea Kelly	4
Mélodie Forsythe	7

== Knockout results ==
All draw times are listed in Atlantic Time (UTC-04:00).

=== Draw 1 ===
Wednesday, December 3, 1:30 pm

Sheet 1	1	2	3	4	5	6	7	8	9	10	11	Final
Mélodie Forsythe 🔨	3	0	0	1	1	0	1	0	1	0	1	8
Sylvie Quillian	0	1	1	0	0	2	0	2	0	1	0	7

Sheet 2	1	2	3	4	5	6	7	8	9	10	Final
Andrea Kelly 🔨	0	2	0	3	0	1	0	2	0	2	10
Melissa Adams	1	0	1	0	3	0	2	0	1	0	8

=== Draw 2 ===
Thursday, December 4, 8:30 am

Sheet 3	1	2	3	4	5	6	7	8	9	10	11	Final
Mélodie Forsythe 🔨	0	0	1	0	1	0	0	1	0	1	0	4
Andrea Kelly	0	0	0	1	0	2	0	0	1	0	1	5

=== Draw 3 ===
Thursday, December 4, 2:00 pm

Sheet 1	1	2	3	4	5	6	7	8	9	10	Final
Melissa Adams	0	1	0	1	0	0	2	0	0	X	4
Mélodie Forsythe 🔨	3	0	1	0	3	1	0	2	1	X	11

Sheet 2	1	2	3	4	5	6	7	8	9	10	Final
Sylvie Quillian	0	1	1	0	1	1	0	0	X	X	4
Andrea Kelly 🔨	3	0	0	3	0	0	3	1	X	X	10

=== Draw 4 ===
Friday, December 5, 1:30 pm

Sheet 4	1	2	3	4	5	6	7	8	9	10	Final
Andrea Kelly 🔨	0	0	2	2	1	0	3	X	X	X	8
Mélodie Forsythe	0	0	0	0	0	2	0	X	X	X	2

=== Draw 5 ===
Friday, December 5, 7:30 pm

Sheet 1	1	2	3	4	5	6	7	8	9	10	Final
Sylvie Quillian	0	0	0	1	0	0	0	X	X	X	1
Mélodie Forsythe 🔨	0	1	1	0	1	2	4	X	X	X	9

Sheet 2	1	2	3	4	5	6	7	8	9	10	Final
Melissa Adams	0	0	0	1	0	0	1	0	X	X	2
Andrea Kelly 🔨	0	2	2	0	1	1	0	3	X	X	9

=== Draw 6 ===
Saturday, December 6, 9:00 am

Sheet 4	1	2	3	4	5	6	7	8	9	10	Final
Andrea Kelly 🔨	1	0	0	2	0	0	1	0	0	X	4
Mélodie Forsythe	0	2	1	0	1	1	0	1	1	X	7

== Playoffs ==
- As winners of the A and B Events, Team Andrea Kelly needed to be beaten twice in the playoffs.

Semifinal			Final
			A	Andrea Kelly	6
B	Andrea Kelly	5	C	Mélodie Forsythe	7
C	Mélodie Forsythe	10

=== Semifinal ===
Saturday, December 6, 3:00 pm

Sheet 3	1	2	3	4	5	6	7	8	9	10	Final
Andrea Kelly	0	1	0	2	0	1	1	0	X	X	5
Mélodie Forsythe 🔨	0	0	2	0	3	0	0	5	X	X	10

=== Final ===
Sunday, December 7, 9:30 am

Sheet 2	1	2	3	4	5	6	7	8	9	10	11	Final
Andrea Kelly	0	0	1	0	0	3	0	1	0	1	0	6
Mélodie Forsythe 🔨	0	1	0	2	1	0	0	0	2	0	1	7

2026 New Brunswick Women's Curling Championship

Mélodie Forsythe
1st New Brunswick Provincial Championship title
