= New Brunswick Women's Curling Championship =

- Established: 1947
- 2026 host city: Fredericton
- 2026 arena: Capital Winter Club
- 2026 champion: Mélodie Forsythe

Current edition
- 2026 New Brunswick Women's Curling Championship

The New Brunswick Women's Curling Championship, formerly the New Brunswick Scotties Tournament of Hearts is the New Brunswick provincial women's curling tournament. The tournament is run by the New Brunswick Curling Association. The winning team represents New Brunswick at the Scotties Tournament of Hearts.

The Moncton Ladies Curling Club organized plans for the first provincial bonspiel for women in 1947. The T. Eaton Company donated a silver tray to be awarded to the winners.

== Past winners ==
(National champions in bold)

Year	Team	Curling club	Host
2026	Mélodie Forsythe, Rebecca Watson, Carly Smith, Jenna Campbell	Capital Winter Club	Fredericton
2025	Melissa Adams, Jaclyn Crandall, Kayla Russell, Kendra Lister, Molli Ward	Capital Winter Club	Saint Andrews
2024	Melissa Adams, Jaclyn Crandall, Molli Ward, Kendra Lister, Kayla Russell	Capital Winter Club	Oromocto
2023	Andrea Kelly, Sylvie Quillian, Jill Brothers, Katie Forward	Capital Winter Club	Fredericton
2022	Cancelled due to the COVID-19 pandemic in New Brunswick; Team Crawford (Andrea Crawford, Sylvie Quillian, Jillian Babin, Katie Forward) represented New Brunswick at Scotties.		
2021	Cancelled due to the COVID-19 pandemic in New Brunswick; Team Adams (Melissa Adams, Jaclyn Tingley, Nicole Arsenault-Bishop, Kendra Lister) represented New Brunswick at Scotties. (Note: Team Crawford was appointed to be New Brunswick's representative at the 2021 Scotties Tournament of Hearts, but declined and was replaced by Melissa Adams.)		
2020	Andrea Crawford, Jennifer Armstrong, Jillian Babin, Katie Forward	Gage Golf & Curling Club	Rothesay
2019	Andrea Crawford, Jillian Keough, Jennifer Armstrong, Katie Forward	Thistle St. Andrews Curling Club	Moncton
2018	Sylvie Robichaud, Melissa Adams, Nicole Arsenault-Bishop, Kendra Lister	Curl Moncton	Moncton
2017	Melissa Adams, Jennifer Armstrong, Cathlia Ward, Katie Forward	Capital Winter Club	Miramichi
2016	Sylvie Robichaud, Rebecca Atkinson, Marie Richard, Jane Boyle	Curl Moncton	Moncton
2015	Sylvie Robichaud, Rebecca Atkinson, Marie Richard, Jane Boyle	Curl Moncton	Fredericton Junction
2014	Andrea Crawford, Rebecca Atkinson, Danielle Parsons, Jodie deSolla	Gage Golf & Curling Club	Saint John
2013	Andrea Crawford, Rebecca Atkinson, Danielle Parsons, Jodie deSolla	Gage Golf & Curling Club	Fredericton Junction
2012	Andrea Kelly (Fourth), Rebecca Atkinson (Skip), Jillian Babin, Jodie deSolla	Gage Golf & Curling Club	Oromocto
2011	Andrea Kelly, Denise Nowlan, Jillian Babin, Lianne Sobey	Gage Golf & Curling Club	Moncton
2010	Andrea Kelly, Denise Nowlan, Jillian Babin, Lianne Sobey	Capital Winter Club	Saint John
2009	Andrea Kelly, Denise Nowlan, Jodie deSolla, Lianne Sobey	Capital Winter Club	Moncton
2008	Sylvie Robichaud, Danielle Nicholson, Marie Richard, Julie Carrier	Curling Beauséjour Inc.	Saint John
2007	Sandy Comeau, Denise Nowlan, Marie-Anne Power, Jeanette Murphy	Beaver Curling Club	Fredericton
2006	Andrea Kelly, Kristen MacDiarmid, Jodie deSolla, Morgan Muise	Capital Winter Club	Moncton
2005	Sandy Comeau, Stacey Leger, Allison Farrell, Sandi Prosser	Beaver Curling Club	Saint John
2004	Heidi Hanlon, Stacey Lacey, Jennifer Gogan, Judy Blanchard	Thistle St. Andrews Curling Club	Miramichi
2003	Heidi Hanlon, Stacey Lacey, Jennifer Gogan, Judy Blanchard	Thistle St. Andrews Curling Club	Fredericton
2002	Kathy Floyd, Marie-Anne Power, Jane Arseneau, Allison Franey	Thistle St. Andrews Curling Club	Moncton
2001	Kathy Floyd, Marie-Anne Power, Allison Franey, Jane Arseneau	Thistle St. Andrews Curling Club	Rothesay
2000	Heidi Hanlon, Sue Dobson, Sheri Stewart, Judy Blanchard	Thistle St. Andrews Curling Club	Bathurst
1999	Marie-Anne Power (Fourth), Kathy Floyd (Skip), Allison Franey, Jane Arseneau	Thistle St. Andrews Curling Club	Fredericton
1998	Kathy Floyd, June Campbell, Allison Franey, Jane Arseneau	Thistle St. Andrews Curling Club	Moncton
1997	Heidi Hanlon, Kathy Floyd, June Campbell, Jane Arseneau	Thistle St. Andrews Curling Club	Saint John
1996	Barb Hutton, Wendy Shephard, Shelly Snider, Paula Whipple	Carleton Curling Club	Dalhousie
1995	Heidi Hanlon, Kathy Floyd, Nancy McConnery, Jane Arseneau	Thistle St. Andrews Curling Club	Fredericton
1994	Heidi Hanlon, Diane Blair, Sheri Stewart, Judy Blanchard	Thistle St. Andrews Curling Club	Moncton
1993	Nancy McConnery, Leanne Perron, Sandy Comeau, Denise Cormier	Beaver Curling Club	Florenceville
1992	Heidi Hanlon, Kathy Floyd, Sheri Stewart, Judy Blanchard	Thistle St. Andrews Curling Club	Saint John
1991	Heidi Hanlon, Kathy Floyd, Sheri Stewart, Mary Harding	Thistle St. Andrews Curling Club	Bathurst
1990	Heidi Hanlon, Kathy Floyd, Sheri Stewart, Judy Blanchard	Thistle St. Andrews Curling Club	Fredericton
1989	Heidi Hanlon, Kathy Floyd, Sheri Stewart, Judy Blanchard	Thistle St. Andrews Curling Club	Newcastle
1988	Karen McDermott, Donna Clinch, Pat Maher, Shirley Jamieson	Bathurst Curling Club	Woodstock
1987	Heidi Hanlon, Gail Shields, Janyce Messer, Judy Blanchard	Thistle St. Andrews Curling Club	Saint John
1986	Grace Donald, Sheri Smith, Carolyn McKay, Debbi Dickeson	Capital Winter Club	Fredericton
1985	Marlene Vaughan, Judy Connor, Gail Shields, Pauline Lynch	Thistle St. Andrews Curling Club	Edmundston
1984	Anne Marie Leahy, Kathy Floyd, Marion Mackin, Susan McCarville	Thistle St. Andrews Curling Club	Moncton
1983	Grace Donald, Connie Bothwell-Myers, Carolyn McKay, Stella Keays	Capital Winter Club Bathurst	
1982	Louise Ouellet, Chantel Vautour, Sheila Walter, Martha Smith	Campbellton Curling Club	Fredericton
1981	Barb Hutton, Nancy Steele, Jane Hutton, Lorraine Brewer	Carleton Curling Club	Moncton
1980	Denise Lavigne, Marie-Anne Vautour, Bonnie Anne Rayworth, Susan Goulet	Beausejour Curling Club	Chatham
1979	Anne Orser, Pat Maher, Elvera Kennah, Shirley Gammon	Bathurst Curling Club	East Riverside
1978	Karen McDermott, Gisele Shaw, Ilona Schnarr, Lillian Lavinge	Bathurst Curling Club	Fredericton
1977	Grace Donald, Jane Mackine, Nancy Syroid, Jackie Petzold	Capital Winter Club	Newscastle
1976	Anne Orser, Pat Maher, Elvera Kennah, Ethel LePage	Bathurst Curling Club	Moncton
1975	Ivy Lord, Dorothy Garey, Claire Olsen, Helen Cook	Thistle St. Andrews Curling Club	Saint John
1974	Dorothy Sedgewick, Jean Greenbank, Mary McLellan, Nancy Syroid	Capital Winter Club	Fredericton
1973	Sheila McLeod, Lois Walker, Agnes Freeze, Isabelle Lougheed	Capital Winter Club	Newcastle
1972	Sheila McLeod, Barbara Douglas, Ann Robinson, Isabelle Lougheed	Capital Winter Club	Moncton
1971	Shirley Pilson, Anne Orser, Pat Maher, Gerry Lenihan	Bathurst Curling Club	Fredericton
1970	Shirley Pilson, Anne Orser, Pat Maher, Gerry Lenihan	Bathurst Curling Club	Campbellton
1969	Phyllis Chapman, Dorothy Thompson, Mary Cooper, Felice Willden	Beaver Curling Club	Moncton
1968	Barbara Likely, Anita McInerney, Willa Archibald, Mildred Patterson	Thistle St. Andrews Curling Club	Newcastle
1967	Shirley Pilson, Anne Orser, Helen Gammon, Geraldine Lenihan	Bathurst Curling Club	Fredericton
1966	Shirley Pilson, Anne Orser, Helen Gammon, Geraldine Lenihan	Bathurst Curling Club	Edmundston
1965	Joan Callaghan, Anne Orser, Shirley Pilson, Geraldine Lenihan	Bathurst Curling Club	Bathurst
1964	Joan Callaghan, Anne Orser, Shirley Pilson, Geraldine Lenihan	Bathurst Curling Club	Saint John
1963	**Mabel DeWare, Harriet Stratton, Forbis Stevenson, Marjorie Fraser**	Beaver Curling Club	Newcastle
1962	Phyliss Pinder, Pauline Thomas, Jean Dick, Eleanor Steeves	Moncton Curlers Association	Fredericton
1961	Mona Comeau, Kay Cormack, Vera Shutt, Evelyn Brooks	Beaver Curling Club	Moncton
1960	Mona Comeau, Kay Cormack, Vera Shutt, Evelyn Brooks	Beaver Curling Club	Campbellton
1959	Mona Comeau, Kay Cormack, Vera Shutt, Evelyn Brooks	Beaver Curling Club	Moncton
1958	Margaret Williamson, Mary McMurray (skip), Mrs. A. Jamieson, Mrs. C. A. Roussell	Bathurst Curling Club	Edmundston
1957	Polly Clogg, Mrs. E. A. Willis, Harriet Stratton, Mabel DeWare	Beaver Curling Club	Saint John
1956	Carmela Murphy, Mrs. M. Barsalou, Mrs. O. V. Stevenson, Mrs. G. E. Miller	Edmunston Curling Club	Bathurst
1955	Polly Clogg, Mrs. E. A. Willis, Harriet Stratton, Mabel DeWare	Beaver Curling Club	Saint John
1954	Bertha C. Stroud, Mrs. F. L. Harding, Mrs. O. G. Hughes, Mrs. G. L. Richter	Thistle St. Andrews Curling Club	Moncton
1953	Margery Johnstone, Mrs. P. A. Clark, Mrs. L. A. Pinder, Mrs. J. E. Surette	Beaver Curling Club	Campbellton
1952	Margery Johnstone, Mrs. L. A. Pinder, Mrs. J. E. Surette, Mrs. P. A. Clark	Beaver Curling Club	Edmundston
1951	Mabel White, Mrs. W. J. Gifford, Mrs. G. R. McWilliam, Mrs. P. E. Roy	Newcastle Curling Club	Moncton
1950	Ann Rogers, Mrs. G. MacKenzie, Mrs. L. F. Gilker, Miss F. Connelly	Campbellton Curling Club	Newcastle
1949	Mary McMurray, Mrs. R. J. Aube, Mrs. A. J. Aube, Miss E. Hachey	Bathurst Curling Club	Saint John
1948	Adrienne Hutchinson, Mrs. E. R. Ingraham, Mrs. G. F. London, Mrs. H. C. Boyers	Thistle St. Andrews Curling Club	Bathurst
1947	Margaret Fryers, Mrs. W. R. Colpitts, Margery Johnstone, Mrs. A. W. Ross	Beaver Curling Club	Moncton
