= Jim Sullivan Curling Classic =

- Established: 2014
- Host city: Fredericton, New Brunswick
- Arena: Capital Winter Club
- Men's purse: $11,500
- Women's purse: $10,000

Current champions (2024)
- Men: (Nova Scotia) Colten Steele
- Women: (New Brunswick) Sarah Mallais

The Jim Sullivan Curling Classic is an annual curling tournament or bonspiel. It used to be held at the Thistle-St. Andrew's Curling Club in Saint John, New Brunswick, but is now held at the Capital Winter Club in Fredericton. The total purse for the men's event is CAD $15,300 with the winning team receiving $5,000. The purse for the women's event is $8,250 with the winner's share being $2,000.

The event is named in honour of Jim Sullivan, a curler in New Brunswick who committed suicide from depression in 2011. The event is a re-incarnation of previous bonspiels played at the Thistle-St. Andrew's Club such as the Fundy Line Cash Spiel, the Fundy Cash and the TSA Fundy Curling Classic (the latter being brought back by Sullivan in 2005).

The title sponsor for the event from 2015 to 2018 was World Financial Group.

In addition to curling, the tournament also attempts to raise awareness of the stigma and stereotypes associated with mental health issues.

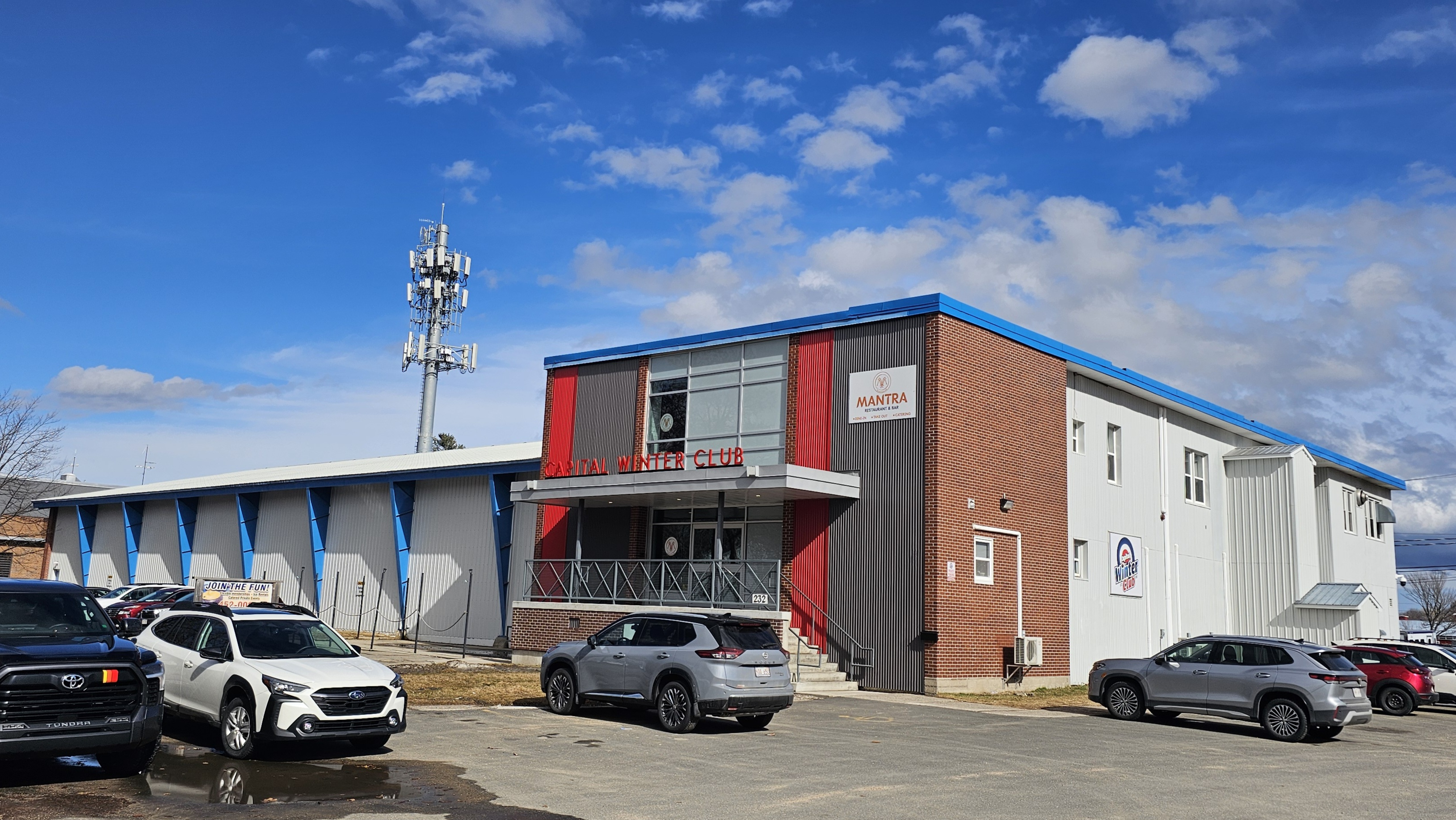
The Capital Winter Club in 2026

The 2022 edition was played at the Capital Winter Club in Fredericton for the first time. It was held in place of the Steele Cup Cash which became the same event.

== Past champions ==
=== Men ===
Year	Winning team	Runner up team	Purse (CAD)	Winner's share (CAD)
2014	(New Brunswick) Wayne Tallon, Mike Kennedy, Mike Flannery, Wade Blanchard	(New Brunswick) Jeremy Mallais, Zach Eldridge, Chris Jeffery, Jared Bezanson	$12,350	$4,000
2015	(Nova Scotia) Jamie Murphy, Jordan Pinder, Scott Saccary, Philip Crowell	(New Brunswick) Jason Vaughan, Charlie Sullivan, Kevin Boyle, Paul Nason	$15,300	$5,000
2016	(Quebec) Jean-Michel Ménard, Martin Crête, Éric Sylvain, Philippe Ménard	(New Brunswick) James Grattan, Paul Flemming, Kevin Boyle, Peter Case	$15,300	$5,000
2017	(Nova Scotia) Jamie Murphy, Paul Flemming, Scott Saccary, Philip Crowell	(New Brunswick) Rene Comeau, Ed Cyr, Chris Wagner, Wayne Tallon (skip)	$15,300	$5,000
2018	(Nova Scotia) Kendal Thompson, Bryce Everist, Chris MacRae, Michael Brophy	(Nova Scotia) Jamie Murphy, Paul Flemming, Scott Saccary, Philip Crowell	$15,300	$5,000
2019	(New Brunswick) James Grattan, Chris Jeffrey, Andy McCann, Jamie Brannen	(New Brunswick) Scott Jones, Jeremy Mallais, Brian King, Robert Daley	$15,300	$5,000
2020	Cancelled			
2021	Cancelled			
2022	(Nova Scotia) Stuart Thompson, Kendal Thompson, Colten Steele, Michael Brophy	(New Brunswick) Mike Kennedy, Jordan Pinder, Marc LeCocq (3 player team)	$15,300	$5,000
2023	(Nova Scotia) Nick Mosher, Sean Beland, Owen McPherson, Aidan MacDonald	(New Brunswick) Zach Eldridge, Chris Jeffrey, Jack Smeltzer, Michael Donovan	$15,300	$5,000
2024	(Nova Scotia) Colten Steele, Kerry MacLean, Paul Dexter, Robby McLean	(New Brunswick) James Grattan, Joel Krats, Paul Dobson, Andy McCann	$11,500	$4,000

=== Women ===
Year	Winning team	Runner up team	Purse (CAD)	Winner's share (CAD)
2015	(New Brunswick) Melissa Adams, Jennifer Armstrong, Cathlia Ward, Kendra Lister	(New Brunswick) Heidi Hanlon, Marie-Anne Power, Judy Blanchard, Jane Arseneau	$2,150	$780
2016	(New Brunswick) Sylvie Robichaud, Jessica Ronalds, Nicole Bishop, Michelle Majeau	(Nova Scotia) Christie Gamble, Brigitte MacPhail, Kaitlyn Veitch, Michelle Lang	$5,000	$1,700
2017	(New Brunswick) Sylvie Robichaud, Melissa Adams, Nicole Bishop, Kendra Lister	(Prince Edward Island) Veronica Smith, Jane DiCarlo, Sabrina Smith, Whitney Young	$5,000	$1,700
2018	(Prince Edward Island) Suzanne Birt, Marie Christianson, Meaghan Hughes, Michelle McQuaid	(New Brunswick) Andrea Crawford, Jillian Keough, Jennifer Armstrong, Katie Forward	$5,500	$1,700
2019	(South Korea) Gim Un-chi, Um Min-ji, Kim Su-ji, Seol Ye-eun	(Prince Edward Island) Suzanne Birt, Marie Christianson, Meaghan Hughes, Michelle McQuaid	$8,250	$2,000
2020	Cancelled			
2021	Cancelled			
2022	(Prince Edward Island) Suzanne Birt (Fourth), Marie Christianson (Skip), Meaghan Hughes, Michelle Shea	(New Brunswick) Andrea Kelly, Sylvie Quillian, Jill Brothers, Katie Forward	$8,250	$2,000
2023	(New Brunswick) Melissa Adams, Jaclyn Crandall, Molli Ward, Kendra Lister, Kayla Russell	(Nova Scotia) Jill Brothers (Fourth), Heather Smith (Skip), Marie Christianson, Erin Carmody	$8,250	$2,000
2024	(New Brunswick) Sarah Mallais, Jocelyn Adams-Moss, Amanda England, Heather MacPhee	(New Brunswick) Mélodie Forsythe, Rebecca Watson, Carly Smith, Jenna Campbell	$10,000	$3,000
