= 2024 New Brunswick Scotties Tournament of Hearts =

- Host city: Oromocto, New Brunswick
- Arena: Gage Golf and Curling Club
- Dates: January 17–21
- Winner: Team Adams
- Curling club: Capital WC, Fredericton
- Skip: Melissa Adams
- Third: Jaclyn Crandall
- Second: Molli Ward
- Lead: Kendra Lister
- Alternate: Kayla Russell
- Coach: Alex Robichaud
- Finalist: Sylvie Quillian

The 2024 New Brunswick Scotties Tournament of Hearts, the provincial women's curling championship for New Brunswick, was held from January 17 to 21 at the Gage Golf and Curling Club in Oromocto, New Brunswick. The winning Melissa Adams rink represented New Brunswick at the 2024 Scotties Tournament of Hearts in Calgary, Alberta where they finished eighth in Pool B with a 2–6 record.

The event was held in a triple knockout for the first time.

== Teams ==
The teams are listed as follows:

Skip	Third	Second	Lead	Alternate	Coach	Club
Melissa Adams	Jaclyn Crandall	Molli Ward	Kendra Lister	Kayla Russell	Alex Robichaud	Capital WC, Fredericton
Nicole Arsenault-Bishop	Natalie Hearn	Lynn LeBlanc	Krista Flanagan	Tyler Parmiter	Damien Lahiton	Curl Moncton, Moncton
Abby Burgess	Brooke Tracy	Sierra Tracy	Sarah Gaines	Katherine Sterling	Dean Grattan	Gage G&CC, Oromocto
Mélodie Forsythe	Rebecca Watson	Caylee Smith	Paige Brewer	Jenna Campbell	Wayne Tallon	Curl Moncton, Moncton
Sylvie Quillian (Fourth)	Sarah Mallais (Skip)	Carol Webb	Jane Boyle		Ellery Robichaud	Curl Moncton, Moncton
Carly Smith	Justine Comeau	Shaelyn Park	Meghan Beland	Jillian Crandall		Capital WC, Fredericton

== Knockout brackets ==
=== A event ===
First Knockout	Qualifier 1
Team Quillian	6
Abby Burgess	8	Abby Burgess	5
Nicole Arsenault-Bishop	5	Team Quillian	5
Melissa Adams	9
Melissa Adams	9
Mélodie Forsythe	7	Carly Smith	2
Carly Smith	10

=== B event ===
Second Knockout	Qualifier 2
Team Quillian	7
Nicole Arsenault-Bishop	4	Carly Smith	6
Carly Smith	6	Team Quillian	3
Mélodie Forsythe	8
Melissa Adams	8
Mélodie Forsythe	10	Mélodie Forsythe	9
Abby Burgess	7

=== C event ===
Third Knockout	Qualifier 3
Team Quillian	5
Nicole Arsenault-Bishop	6	Melissa Adams	3
Melissa Adams	8	Team Quillian	9
Mélodie Forsythe	3
Mélodie Forsythe	11
Abby Burgess	8	Carly Smith	1
Carly Smith	9

== Knockout results ==
All draw times are listed in Atlantic Time (UTC-04:00).

=== Draw 1 ===
Wednesday, January 17, 7:00 pm

Sheet 2	1	2	3	4	5	6	7	8	9	10	Final
Abby Burgess	2	0	2	0	1	1	0	1	0	1	8
Nicole Arsenault-Bishop	0	1	0	1	0	0	2	0	1	0	5

Sheet 4	1	2	3	4	5	6	7	8	9	10	Final
Mélodie Forsythe	0	2	0	1	1	0	2	0	1	X	7
Carly Smith	2	0	4	0	0	3	0	1	0	X	10

=== Draw 2 ===
Thursday, January 18, 1:30 pm

Sheet 2	1	2	3	4	5	6	7	8	9	10	Final
Melissa Adams	1	0	3	2	0	1	1	1	X	X	9
Carly Smith	0	1	0	0	1	0	0	0	X	X	2

Sheet 4	1	2	3	4	5	6	7	8	9	10	Final
Team Quillian	0	0	0	1	0	1	2	0	0	2	6
Abby Burgess	1	0	1	0	1	0	0	2	0	0	5

=== Draw 3 ===
Thursday, January 18, 7:00 pm

Sheet 2	1	2	3	4	5	6	7	8	9	10	11	Final
Mélodie Forsythe	0	2	0	0	2	0	1	0	0	2	3	10
Abby Burgess	2	0	0	1	0	2	0	1	1	0	0	7

Sheet 3	1	2	3	4	5	6	7	8	9	10	Final
Team Quillian	0	0	0	1	0	0	3	1	0	X	5
Melissa Adams	0	2	2	0	3	1	0	0	1	X	9

Sheet 4	1	2	3	4	5	6	7	8	9	10	Final
Nicole Arsenault-Bishop	0	1	0	0	0	1	0	1	1	0	4
Carly Smith	0	0	1	2	1	0	1	0	0	1	6

=== Draw 4 ===
Friday, January 19, 2:00 pm

Sheet 2	1	2	3	4	5	6	7	8	9	10	Final
Team Quillian	0	0	0	2	0	1	1	0	2	1	7
Carly Smith	0	2	1	0	1	0	0	2	0	0	6

Sheet 4	1	2	3	4	5	6	7	8	9	10	11	Final
Melissa Adams	0	1	3	0	0	1	0	2	0	1	0	8
Mélodie Forsythe	3	0	0	1	1	0	1	0	2	0	1	9

=== Draw 5 ===
Friday, January 19, 7:00 pm

Sheet 2	1	2	3	4	5	6	7	8	9	10	Final
Nicole Arsenault-Bishop	0	2	0	2	0	0	0	1	0	1	6
Melissa Adams	2	0	2	0	1	1	1	0	1	0	8

Sheet 3	1	2	3	4	5	6	7	8	9	10	Final
Team Quillian	0	0	1	0	1	0	0	1	0	X	3
Mélodie Forsythe	2	1	0	1	0	1	2	0	1	X	8

Sheet 4	1	2	3	4	5	6	7	8	9	10	11	Final
Abby Burgess	1	1	0	2	1	0	0	0	2	1	0	8
Carly Smith	0	0	2	0	0	1	1	4	0	0	1	9

=== Draw 6 ===
Saturday, January 20, 2:00 pm

Sheet 2	1	2	3	4	5	6	7	8	9	10	Final
Mélodie Forsythe	0	2	3	3	0	3	X	X	X	X	11
Carly Smith	0	0	0	0	1	0	X	X	X	X	1

Sheet 4	1	2	3	4	5	6	7	8	9	10	Final
Team Quillian	1	0	0	1	0	1	0	1	0	1	5
Melissa Adams	0	0	1	0	1	0	0	0	1	0	3

=== Draw 7 ===
Saturday, January 20, 7:00 pm

Sheet 3	1	2	3	4	5	6	7	8	9	10	Final
Team Quillian	0	1	0	1	1	2	2	0	2	X	9
Mélodie Forsythe	0	0	2	0	0	0	0	1	0	X	3

== Playoffs ==
- Team Quillian advanced directly to the final as the only team to compete in all three qualifying games.

Semifinal			Final
			1	Team Quillian	4
2	Mélodie Forsythe	4	3	Melissa Adams	7
3	Melissa Adams	8

=== Semifinal ===
Sunday, January 21, 10:00 am

Sheet 3	1	2	3	4	5	6	7	8	9	10	Final
Mélodie Forsythe	0	1	0	0	0	1	0	2	0	0	4
Melissa Adams	0	0	1	1	2	0	1	0	1	2	8

=== Final ===
Sunday, January 21, 3:00 pm

Sheet 3	1	2	3	4	5	6	7	8	9	10	Final
Team Quillian	0	0	1	0	2	0	1	0	0	X	4
Melissa Adams	2	0	0	1	0	1	0	2	1	X	7

2024 New Brunswick Scotties Tournament of Hearts

Melissa Adams
3rd New Brunswick Provincial Championship title
