= Tim Hortons Spitfire Arms Cash Spiel =

Annual curling tournament in Windsor, Nova Scotia, Canada

- Established: 2015
- Host city: Windsor, Nova Scotia
- Arena: Windsor Curling Club
- Purse: $9,000
- 2022 champion: (Nova Scotia) Christina Black

The Tim Hortons Spitfire Arms Cash Spiel (known originally as the Spitfire Arms Cash Spiel) is an annual bonspiel, or curling tournament, held at the Windsor Curling Club in Windsor, Nova Scotia. It was held as part of the women's World Curling Tour from 2015 to 2019 and was part of the men's Tour from 2015 to 2017. The tournament is held in a round robin format.

== Past Champions ==
=== Women ===
Year	Winning team	Runner up team	Purse (CAD)
2015	(Nova Scotia) Theresa Breen, Tanya Hilliard, Jocelyn Adams, Amanda Simpson	(Nova Scotia) Mary-Anne Arsenault, Christina Black, Jane Snyder, Jennifer Baxter	$4,900
2016	(Nova Scotia) Colleen Jones, Kim Kelly, Mary Sue Radford, Nancy Delahunt	(Nova Scotia) Mary-Anne Arsenault, Christina Black, Jennifer Crouse, Jennifer Baxter	$6,200
2017	(Nova Scotia) Julie McEvoy, Danielle Parsons, Sheena Moore, Jill Thomas	(Nova Scotia) Jill Brothers, Erin Carmody, Sarah Murphy, Jenn Brine	$8,000
2018	(New Brunswick) Sylvie Robichaud, Melissa Adams, Nicole Arsenault Bishop, Kendra Lister	(Prince Edward Island) Suzanne Birt, Marie Christianson, Meaghan Hughes, Michelle McQuaid	$13,000
2019	(Prince Edward Island) Suzanne Birt, Marie Christianson, Meaghan Hughes, Michelle McQuaid	(New Brunswick) Sylvie Quillian, Melissa Adams, Nicole Arsenault Bishop, Kendra Lister	$14,000
2020	Cancelled		
2021	(Nova Scotia) Christina Black, Jenn Baxter, Karlee Jones, Shelley Barker	(Nova Scotia) Jennifer Crouse, Kate Callaghan, Sheena Moore, Kaitlin Fralic	$10,500
2022	(Nova Scotia) Christina Black, Jenn Baxter, Karlee Everist, Shelley Barker	(Nova Scotia) Jennifer Crouse, Julie McEvoy, Sheena Moore, Kaitlin Fralic	$9,000

=== Men ===
Year	Winning team	Runner up team	Purse (CAD)
2015	(Nova Scotia) Stuart Thompson, Colten Steele, Travis Colter, Alex MacNeil	(Nova Scotia) Nicholas Deagle, Jason VanVonderen, Rob Phillips, Ryan Sperry	$4,900
2016	(Nova Scotia) Doug MacKenzie, Richard Barker, Martin Gavin, Sean Audas	(Nova Scotia) Scott Saunders, Mike Myra, Curt Palmer, Glenn Josephson	$4,500
2017	(Nova Scotia) Kendal Thompson, Bryce Everist, Jamie Danbrook, Jared Brown	(Nova Scotia) Mike Callaghan, Logan Ward, Ian Wilson, Brad Wilson	$3,000
