= 2023 New Brunswick Scotties Tournament of Hearts =

- Host city: Fredericton, New Brunswick
- Arena: Capital Winter Club
- Dates: January 18–22
- Winner: Team Kelly
- Curling club: Capital WC, Fredericton
- Skip: Andrea Kelly
- Third: Sylvie Quillian
- Second: Jill Brothers
- Lead: Katie Forward
- Coach: Daryell Nowlan
- Finalist: Abby Burgess

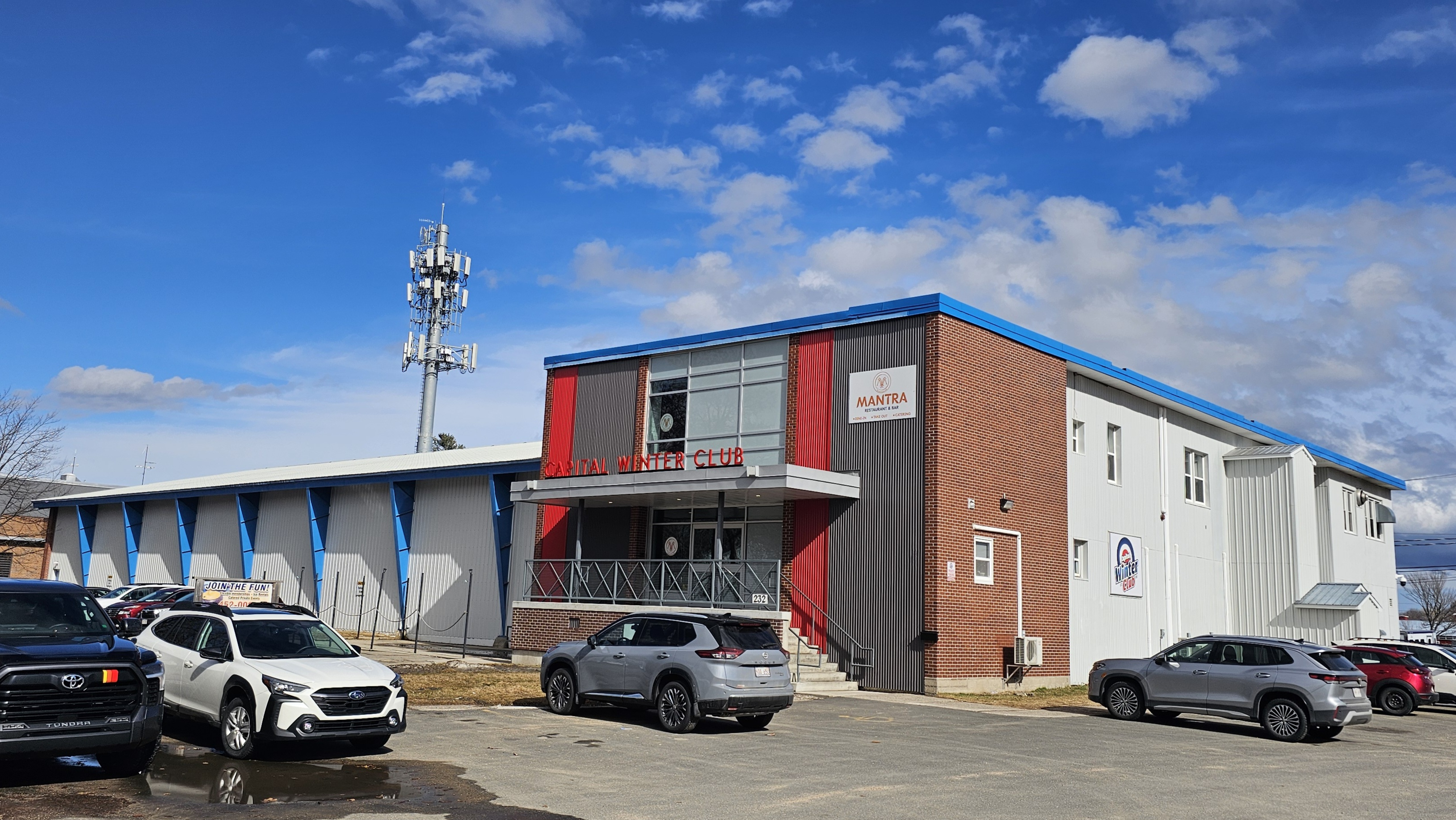
The Capital Winter Club in 2026

The 2023 New Brunswick Scotties Tournament of Hearts, the provincial women's curling championship for New Brunswick, was held from January 18 to 22 at the Capital Winter Club in Fredericton. The winning Andrea Kelly rink represented New Brunswick at the 2023 Scotties Tournament of Hearts in Kamloops, British Columbia, and finished seventh in Pool B with a 3–5 record.

== Qualification process ==
Seven teams played in a preliminary tournament to determine seeding. All seven entries went on to play in the provincial championship.

Qualification method	Berths	Qualifying teams (seed)
Prelims	7	Andrea Kelly (1); Jaclyn Crandall (2); Shaelyn Park (3); Sarah Gaines (4); Abby Burgess (5); Shelly Graham (6); Samantha Crook (7)

== Teams ==
The teams are listed as follows:

Skip	Third	Second	Lead	Alternate	Club(s)
Abby Burgess	Brooke Tracy	Tyler Parmiter	Taryn Abernethy	Katherine Sterling	Gage G&CC, Oromocto
Jaclyn Crandall	Kendra Lister	Molli Ward	Kayla Russell	Melissa Adams	Capital WC, Fredericton
Samantha Crook	Amy Butts	Natalie Hearn	Sarah Doak		Capital WC, Fredericton
Sarah Gaines	Leah Cluff	Carly Smith	Ashley Coughlan	Sierra Tracy	Gage G&CC, Oromocto
Shelly Graham	Sharon Levesque	Robyn Witherell	Shelley Murray		Capital WC, Fredericton
Andrea Kelly	Sylvie Quillian	Jill Brothers	Katie Forward		Capital WC, Fredericton
Shaelyn Park	Nicole Arsenault Bishop	Krista Flanagan	Lynn LeBlanc		Curl Moncton, Moncton

== Round-robin standings ==
Final round-robin standings

Key
Teams to Playoffs
Teams to Tiebreaker

Skip	W	L	PF	PA	EW	EL	BE	SE
Andrea Kelly	6	0	58	11	29	9	3	16
Abby Burgess	5	1	48	37	30	24	2	10
Shaelyn Park	3	3	40	51	25	28	2	6
Jaclyn Crandall	3	3	36	22	30	24	3	13
Samantha Crook	2	4	30	46	19	25	5	6
Shelly Graham	2	4	25	41	16	26	3	2
Sarah Gaines	0	6	25	50	15	30	5	2

== Round-robin results ==
All draw times are listed in Atlantic Time (UTC-04:00).

=== Draw 1 ===
Wednesday, January 18, 1:30 pm

Sheet 2	1	2	3	4	5	6	7	8	9	10	Final
Andrea Kelly 🔨	3	2	1	3	2	0	X	X	X	X	11
Shaelyn Park	0	0	0	0	0	1	X	X	X	X	1

Sheet 3	1	2	3	4	5	6	7	8	9	10	Final
Sarah Gaines	0	0	3	0	0	0	0	1	0	X	4
Shelly Graham 🔨	0	1	0	2	0	0	1	0	2	X	6

Sheet 4	1	2	3	4	5	6	7	8	9	10	Final
Jaclyn Crandall	0	2	0	2	0	0	1	3	X	X	8
Samantha Crook 🔨	1	0	2	0	0	0	0	0	X	X	3

=== Draw 2 ===
Wednesday, January 18, 7:00 pm

Sheet 2	1	2	3	4	5	6	7	8	9	10	11	Final
Sarah Gaines 🔨	0	0	1	0	1	0	0	2	0	1	0	5
Samantha Crook	0	0	0	1	0	2	2	0	0	0	1	6

Sheet 3	1	2	3	4	5	6	7	8	9	10	Final
Jaclyn Crandall	1	0	1	1	0	1	1	0	1	0	6
Abby Burgess 🔨	0	1	0	0	3	0	0	1	0	3	8

Sheet 4	1	2	3	4	5	6	7	8	9	10	Final
Shaelyn Park 🔨	0	1	0	3	0	0	0	1	0	0	5
Shelly Graham	0	0	2	0	0	2	0	0	2	2	8

=== Draw 3 ===
Thursday, January 19, 1:00 pm

Sheet 2	1	2	3	4	5	6	7	8	9	10	Final
Shelly Graham	0	0	0	0	0	0	X	X	X	X	0
Andrea Kelly 🔨	2	1	1	1	1	3	X	X	X	X	9

Sheet 3	1	2	3	4	5	6	7	8	9	10	Final
Samantha Crook 🔨	3	2	0	0	0	1	0	0	0	X	6
Shaelyn Park	0	0	1	2	2	0	5	1	0	X	11

Sheet 4	1	2	3	4	5	6	7	8	9	10	Final
Abby Burgess 🔨	0	1	0	1	2	1	1	1	1	0	8
Sarah Gaines	0	0	4	0	0	0	0	0	0	0	4

=== Draw 4 ===
Thursday, January 19, 7:00 pm

Sheet 2	1	2	3	4	5	6	7	8	9	10	Final
Shaelyn Park	2	0	2	0	1	0	0	1	1	0	7
Jaclyn Crandall 🔨	0	2	0	1	0	1	1	0	0	1	6

Sheet 3	1	2	3	4	5	6	7	8	9	10	Final
Abby Burgess	0	0	1	0	0	3	0	1	0	X	5
Andrea Kelly 🔨	2	1	0	1	1	0	2	0	3	X	10

Sheet 4	1	2	3	4	5	6	7	8	9	10	Final
Samantha Crook	0	1	2	3	0	1	1	X	X	X	8
Shelly Graham 🔨	1	0	0	0	1	0	0	X	X	X	2

=== Draw 5 ===
Friday, January 20, 1:00 pm

Sheet 2	1	2	3	4	5	6	7	8	9	10	Final
Samantha Crook	0	1	0	0	0	2	0	0	1	2	6
Abby Burgess 🔨	1	0	1	1	0	0	3	1	0	0	7

Sheet 3	1	2	3	4	5	6	7	8	9	10	Final
Shelly Graham	0	2	0	0	0	1	0	0	0	X	3
Jaclyn Crandall 🔨	1	0	1	1	0	0	0	1	2	X	6

Sheet 4	1	2	3	4	5	6	7	8	9	10	Final
Sarah Gaines	0	0	1	0	0	0	1	X	X	X	2
Andrea Kelly 🔨	0	3	0	0	5	1	0	X	X	X	9

=== Draw 6 ===
Friday, January 20, 7:00 pm

Sheet 2	1	2	3	4	5	6	7	8	9	10	Final
Jaclyn Crandall 🔨	2	2	0	2	1	1	2	X	X	X	10
Sarah Gaines	0	0	1	0	0	0	0	X	X	X	1

Sheet 3	1	2	3	4	5	6	7	8	9	10	Final
Andrea Kelly 🔨	2	3	2	0	3	3	X	X	X	X	13
Samantha Crook	0	0	0	1	0	0	X	X	X	X	1

Sheet 4	1	2	3	4	5	6	7	8	9	10	Final
Shaelyn Park	0	2	0	1	0	0	2	0	0	X	5
Abby Burgess 🔨	2	0	2	0	2	3	0	1	1	X	11

=== Draw 7 ===
Saturday, January 21, 9:00 am

Sheet 2	1	2	3	4	5	6	7	8	9	10	Final
Abby Burgess 🔨	3	1	0	0	0	2	0	1	0	2	9
Shelly Graham	0	0	2	1	0	0	2	0	1	0	6

Sheet 3	1	2	3	4	5	6	7	8	9	10	11	Final
Shaelyn Park 🔨	1	0	1	0	0	2	2	0	3	0	2	11
Sarah Gaines	0	4	0	1	2	0	0	1	0	1	0	9

Sheet 4	1	2	3	4	5	6	7	8	9	10	Final
Andrea Kelly 🔨	0	0	1	0	3	0	0	1	1	X	6
Jaclyn Crandall	0	1	0	1	0	0	0	0	0	X	2

== Tiebreaker ==
Saturday, January 21, 2:30 pm

Sheet 3	1	2	3	4	5	6	7	8	9	10	Final
Shaelyn Park	1	0	2	0	2	1	0	0	0	2	8
Jaclyn Crandall 🔨	0	2	0	1	0	0	1	1	1	0	6

== Playoffs ==
Semifinal			Final
			1	Andrea Kelly	10
2	Abby Burgess	9	2	Abby Burgess	5
3	Shaelyn Park	6

=== Semifinal ===
Saturday, January 21, 8:00 pm

Sheet 3	1	2	3	4	5	6	7	8	9	10	Final
Abby Burgess 🔨	2	1	1	2	0	0	0	2	1	X	9
Shaelyn Park	0	0	0	0	3	2	1	0	0	X	6

=== Final ===
Sunday, January 22, 2:00 pm

Sheet 3	1	2	3	4	5	6	7	8	9	10	Final
Andrea Kelly 🔨	2	0	3	2	0	1	0	0	2	X	10
Abby Burgess	0	1	0	0	2	0	1	1	0	X	5

2023 New Brunswick Scotties Tournament of Hearts

Andrea Kelly
10th New Brunswick Provincial Championship title
