= 2024 Scotties Tournament of Hearts =

Canada's women's curling championship

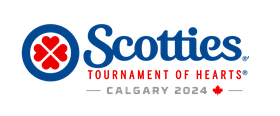
- Host city: Calgary, Alberta
- Arena: Markin MacPhail Centre
- Dates: February 16–25
- Attendance: 63,971
- Winner: Ontario (Homan)
- Curling club: Ottawa CC, Ottawa
- Skip: Rachel Homan
- Third: Tracy Fleury
- Second: Emma Miskew
- Lead: Sarah Wilkes
- Alternate: Rachelle Brown
- Coach: Don Bartlett
- Finalist: Manitoba (Jennifer Jones)

The 2024 Scotties Tournament of Hearts, Canada's national women's curling championship, was held from February 16 to 25 at the Markin MacPhail Centre at Canada Olympic Park in Calgary, Alberta. The winning Rachel Homan team represented Canada at the 2024 World Women's Curling Championship at Centre 200 in Sydney, Nova Scotia where they won the gold medal.

== Summary ==
A few days before the tournament started, six-time Scotties champion and 2014 Olympic gold medallist Jennifer Jones announced that this would be her final Hearts. The 2024 Hearts marks her 18th appearance at the national championship, and her six wins is tied for the most with Colleen Jones.

Curling Canada announced prior to the first draw of competition that Team Canada lead Briane Harris was deemed "ineligible" to play in the tournament without going into any more detail. She was replaced by alternate Krysten Karwacki. Following the event, in March, it was revealed that Harris had been provisionally suspended for up to four years for testing positive for Ligandrol, a banned substance. Harris will be appealing the decision to the Court of Arbitration for Sport.

Following five hog-line violations in Draw 2, Curling Canada chief icemaker, Greg Ewasko decided to disable the rock handle sensors, which were used to determine if a curler had released their stone before the near hogline. It has been theorized that the technology may have been interfered with due to ferrous metals beneath the ice surface.

In Draw 8, Team Ontario–Homan broke a single-game Scotties record for highest team percentage as they curled 97% in their 11–2 victory over Yukon. The previous record was 96% set by Team Canada's Colleen Jones in 2004.

In Draw 10, Kerry Galusha's Northwest Territories rink set a record for the largest comeback in Scotties history, overcoming a seven-point deficit after three ends to defeat Ontario's Danielle Inglis 10–9. It is the biggest comeback at a national championship since the 1970 Canadian Ladies Curling Association Championship.

Team Ontario–Homan second Emma Miskew recorded her one hundredth win at the Scotties following the team's 7–5 victory over Manitoba's Jennifer Jones in Draw 12.

On February 21, Team Alberta (Selena Sturmay), Team Ontario (Rachel Homan), Team Canada (Kerri Einarson) and Team Manitoba (Jennifer Jones) all clinched championship round berths.

At the conclusion of Draw 17, five teams in Pool A were tied for the third championship round spot with 4–4 records: British Columbia (Corryn Brown), Manitoba (Kaitlyn Lawes), Northern Ontario (Krista McCarville), Quebec (Laurie St-Georges) and Saskatchewan (Skylar Ackerman). As all the teams were 2–2 against each other head-to-head, and with tiebreakers being eliminated this year, draw to the button totals was used to determine the final ranking. Manitoba (Lawes) earned the final spot with Northern Ontario finishing fourth, British Columbia (Brown) fifth, Saskatchewan sixth and Quebec seventh.

In Draw 18, Manitoba's Kate Cameron rink clinched the final championship round spot in Pool B by defeating British Columbia's Clancy Grandy 7–4. Both teams finished the round robin with 5–3 records, however, their final head-to-head win allowed Cameron to advance.

In the Page 1/2 qualifiers, Ontario's Rachel Homan and Manitoba's Jennifer Jones both secured their spots in the final four playoff round. Homan's rink fended off Canada's Kerri Einarson 8–4 while Jones downed Alberta's Selena Sturmay by the same score. The win was also Rachel Homan's one hundredth career win at the Scotties. Kerri Einarson's run of four straight Scotties championships came to an end when she lost her next playoff game to Kate Cameron, 9–4. Einarson missed a thin double attempt on her last shot, losing the game. Meanwhile, Alberta's Sturmay downed Kaitlyn Lawes 8–5 in the other qualification game, eliminating her from playoff contention.

In the page playoffs, Rachel Homan played Jennifer Jones in the 1 vs. 2 game, while Selena Sturmay took on Kate Cameron in the 3 vs. 4 game. The Homan–Jones match was won by Homan in an extra end. Homan forced the extra with a draw to the button in the 10th. In the extra end, Jones missed an angle raise to score, giving the win to Homan. The game saw Homan give up steals for the first time in the tournament, when she gave up points with the hammer in the sixth and eighth. The game was described as 'intense', with Homan lead Sarah Wilkes calling it "thrilling", and Homan saying the game was "unbelievable". In the 3 vs 4 game, Team Cameron prevailed over Sturmay, 6–4. Sturmay blamed her poor shot making for the loss.

Jones' loss to Homan in the 1 vs. 2 game put her in the semifinal against Cameron, who had come from winning her 3 vs. 4 game. In the semifinal, Jones got off to a great start by scoring a five-ender in the first end after she made a double takeout. This would prove to be the knockout blow, as Jones would go on to win the game 12–7, sending her to the final in a re-match against Homan.

The final between Homan and Jones was a close affair. Team Homan started the game with hammer, and blanked the first end after Jones removed two Ontario stones as well as her own on her last shot. Homan got on the board first in the second end after Homan missed both her attempts at doubles, but stuck her last rock for one, taking a 1–0 lead. In the third end, Jones tied the game, but hogged her last shot, which would have been a draw for two. In the fourth end, Homan made a hit and stick for a single, which was confirmed after losing a measurement for two, taking a 2–1 lead. Homan got the first real advantage of the game, getting a steal in the fifth end to take a 3–1 lead into the break. On her last, Homan made a perfect run back on a Jones rock on the button to sit perfectly buried in the four-foot. Jones was heavy on her draw, giving up the point to Homan. Going into the sixth end, Homan was out-curling Jones 98 to 68 per cent. The sixth was blanked, which was followed by Jones scoring a single in seventh after making a tricky tap of a Homan rock for one. Homan replied in the eighth with a soft hit and roll to the button to take a 4–2 lead. Jones was able to tie the game at four in the ninth end after Homan stuffed a double takeout attempt perfectly between two frozen Jones rocks in the eight-foot, having the stuffed Jone rock roll up into the four-foot to sit shot. Jones replied with a draw for her second point. In the final end, Jones had to draw to the button on her last shot against a Homan counter, but wrecked on a Homan rock in the eight-foot. With Homan counting already, she did not have to throw her last rock, and won the game 5–4. The win gave Homan and second Emma Miskew their fourth career Scotties titles. The event was the first Scotties title for Homan's third, Tracy Fleury and the second for lead Sarah Wilkes who won in 2019 with Chelsea Carey. It was the second straight silver medal for Jones and her team of Karlee Burgess, Emily Zacharias and Lauren Lenentine who lost in 2023 to Kerri Einarson.

== Teams ==
A total of eighteen teams qualified for the 2024 Scotties. The fourteen Canadian curling member associations held playdowns to determine who would represent their province or territory. Team Canada is represented by Team Kerri Einarson, who won their fourth straight Scotties championship at the 2023 Scotties Tournament of Hearts.

In a change in the qualification format, the Rachel Homan and Jennifer Jones rinks automatically pre-qualified for the 2024 Scotties field based on their 2022–23 Canadian Team Ranking Standings, which meant they bypassed the provincial qualifiers. The top two non-qualified teams on the 2023–24 CTRS standings following provincial and territorial playdowns also qualified after it was announced that Nunavut would be withdrawing from the tournament, and replaced by a second Wild Card team.

The teams are listed as follows:

Canada	Alberta	British Columbia (Grandy)
Gimli CC, Gimli Skip: Kerri Einarson; Third: Val Sweeting; Second: Shannon Birchard; Lead: Krysten Karwacki	Saville Community SC, Edmonton Skip: Selena Sturmay; Third: Danielle Schmiemann; Second: Dezaray Hawes; Lead: Paige Papley	Vancouver CC, Vancouver Skip: Clancy Grandy; Third: Kayla MacMillan; Second: Lindsay Dubue; Lead: Sarah Loken
Manitoba (Lawes)	New Brunswick	Newfoundland and Labrador
Fort Rouge CC, Winnipeg Skip: Kaitlyn Lawes; Third: Selena Njegovan; Second: Jocelyn Peterman; Lead: Kristin MacCuish	Capital WC, Fredericton Skip: Melissa Adams; Third: Jaclyn Crandall; Second: Molli Ward; Lead: Kendra Lister (Note: Team New Brunswick's alternate Kayla Russell threw lead stones during Draw 18.); Alternate: Kayla Russell	St. John's CC, St. John's (Note: Team Newfoundland and Labrador used a five-player rotation.) Skip: Stacie Curtis; Third: Erica Curtis; Second: Julie Hynes; Lead: Camille Burt; Alternate: Jessica Wiseman
Northern Ontario	Nova Scotia	Ontario (Inglis)
Fort William CC, Thunder Bay Skip: Krista McCarville; Third: Andrea Kelly; Second: Kendra Lilly (Note: Team Northern Ontario used a front-end rotation.); Lead: Ashley Sippala; Alternate: Sarah Potts	Halifax CC, Halifax Fourth: Jill Brothers; Skip: Heather Smith; Second: Marie Christianson; Lead: Erin Carmody; Alternate: Taylour Stevens	Ottawa Hunt & GC, Ottawa Skip: Danielle Inglis; Third: Kira Brunton; Second: Calissa Daly; Lead: Cassandra de Groot (Note: Team Ontario (Inglis)'s alternate Kim Tuck threw lead stones for the last end of Draw 14.); Alternate: Kim Tuck
Prince Edward Island	Quebec	Saskatchewan
Crapaud Community CC, Crapaud Fourth: Veronica Mayne; Skip: Jane DiCarlo; Second: Sabrina Smith (Note: Team Prince Edward Island alternate Emily Best threw second stones for the final two ends of Draw 9.); Lead: Whitney Jenkins; Alternate: Emily Best	Glenmore CC, Dollard-des-Ormeaux & CC Laval-sur-le-Lac, Laval Skip: Laurie St-Georges; Third: Jamie Sinclair (Note: Team Quebec alternate Marie-France Larouche threw third stones during Draws 7 and 13.); Second: Emily Riley; Lead: Kelly Middaugh; Alternate: Marie-France Larouche	Nutana CC, Saskatoon Skip: Skylar Ackerman; Third: Ashley Thevenot; Second: Taylor Stremick; Lead: Kaylin Skinner; Alternate: Amber Holland
Northwest Territories	Yukon	Ontario (Homan)
Yellowknife CC, Yellowknife Fourth: Jo-Ann Rizzo; Third: Margot Flemming; Second: Sarah Koltun; Skip: Kerry Galusha; Alternate: Shona Barbour	Whitehorse CC, Whitehorse Skip: Bayly Scoffin; Third: Kerry Foster (Note: For their final three draws, Team Yukon's second Raelyn Helston threw third stones while third Kerry Foster threw second stones.); Second: Raelyn Helston; Lead: Kimberly Tuor (Note: For Draws 6, 12 and 18, Team Yukon's alternate Helen Strong threw lead stones while lead Kimberly Tuor sat out.); Alternate: Helen Strong	Ottawa CC, Ottawa Skip: Rachel Homan; Third: Tracy Fleury; Second: Emma Miskew; Lead: Sarah Wilkes (Note: Team Ontario (Homan)'s alternate Rachelle Brown threw lead stones for the last two ends of Draw 8 and the last end of Draw 18.); Alternate: Rachelle Brown
Manitoba (Jones)	Manitoba (Cameron)	British Columbia (Brown)
St. Vital CC, Winnipeg & Altona CC, Altona Skip: Jennifer Jones; Third: Karlee Burgess; Second: Emily Zacharias; Lead: Lauren Lenentine	Granite CC, Winnipeg Skip: Kate Cameron; Third: Meghan Walter (Note: Prior to Draw 16, Team Manitoba (Cameron)'s third Meghan Walter fell ill and did not play. With alternate Taylor McDonald expecting a child, the team opted to use three players. Walter returned as third for Draw 18.); Second: Kelsey Rocque; Lead: Mackenzie Elias; Alternate: Taylor McDonald	Kamloops CC, Kamloops Skip: Corryn Brown; Third: Erin Pincott; Second: Jennifer Armstrong; Lead: Samantha Fisher; Alternate: Jaelyn Cotter

=== CTRS Rankings ===
As of January 29, 2024

Member Association (Skip)	Rank	Points
Ontario (Homan)	1	343.750
Manitoba (Jones)	2	263.875
Canada (Einarson)	3	222.750
Manitoba (Lawes)	4	178.875
Alberta (Sturmay)	5	142.125
Ontario (Inglis)	6	134.750
Manitoba (Cameron)	7	124.250
British Columbia (Brown)	8	122.375
Saskatchewan (Ackerman)	12	105.063
British Columbia (Grandy)	16	93.750
Northwest Territories (Galusha)	19	60.938
Northern Ontario (McCarville)	23	55.313
Quebec (St-Georges)	24	53.688
Nova Scotia (Smith)	36	36.313
New Brunswick (Adams)	46	22.125
Prince Edward Island (DiCarlo)	78	11.000
Newfoundland and Labrador (Curtis)	90	6.750
Yukon (Scoffin)	NR	0.000

== Map of teams ==
Team Canada Pre-Qualified Teams Provincial Winners Wild-Card Teams

== Wild card selection ==
Previously, three wild card berths were allocated to the top teams in the Canadian Team Ranking System (CTRS) standings who did not win their provincial/territorial championship. Beginning with this year's Scotties, Curling Canada changed the qualification format where the top two teams from the previous year's CTRS would receive an automatic pre-qualification berth without having to qualify. The final berth will be given to the team with the highest CTRS ranking on January 29, 2024, who did not win their provincial/territorial championship.

On January 8, Curling Canada announced that Nunavut withdrew their entry from this year's tournament. Curling Canada subsequently added a second wild card berth for this year's tournament to replace the Nunavut entry.

CTRS standings for Wild Card selection
Rank	Team	Member Association	Eligibility
1	~~Rachel Homan~~	Ontario	Received pre-qualification berth (ineligible)
2	~~Jennifer Jones~~	Manitoba	Received pre-qualification berth (ineligible)
3	~~Kerri Einarson~~	Manitoba	Qualified as Team Canada (ineligible)
4	~~Kaitlyn Lawes~~	Manitoba	Won Manitoba provincials
5	~~Selena Sturmay~~	Alberta	Won Alberta Provincials
6	~~Danielle Inglis~~	Ontario	Won Ontario provincials
7	Kate Cameron	Manitoba	Eliminated from provincials
8	Corryn Brown	British Columbia	Eliminated from provincials

== Round robin standings ==
Final Round Robin Standings

Key
Teams to Championship Round

Pool A	Skip	W	L	W–L	PF	PA	EW	EL	BE	SE	S%	LSD
Alberta	Selena Sturmay	7	1	1–0	64	43	37	32	4	8	83%	350.7
Canada	Kerri Einarson	7	1	0–1	69	41	40	29	1	13	86%	583.8
Manitoba (Lawes)	Kaitlyn Lawes	4	4	2–2	53	46	30	35	9	3	83%	231.6
Northern Ontario	Krista McCarville	4	4	2–2	55	46	37	31	4	12	81%	370.3
British Columbia (Brown)	Corryn Brown	4	4	2–2	64	50	38	32	0	11	82%	466.9
Saskatchewan	Skylar Ackerman	4	4	2–2	51	64	35	34	1	9	75%	575.5
Quebec	Laurie St-Georges	4	4	2–2	43	51	31	36	4	4	78%	578.3
Newfoundland and Labrador	Stacie Curtis	2	6	–	46	70	29	42	0	5	76%	847.4
Prince Edward Island	Jane DiCarlo	0	8	–	43	77	30	36	4	2	75%	1008.1

Pool B	Skip	W	L	W–L	PF	PA	EW	EL	BE	SE	S%	LSD
Ontario (Homan)	Rachel Homan	8	0	–	71	31	40	24	4	14	89%	632.9
Manitoba (Jones)	Jennifer Jones	6	2	–	68	38	34	30	1	10	82%	306.2
Manitoba (Cameron)	Kate Cameron	5	3	1–0	52	52	34	29	5	8	81%	484.7
British Columbia (Grandy)	Clancy Grandy	5	3	0–1	59	48	33	29	4	10	81%	282.8
Northwest Territories	Kerry Galusha	3	5	1–1	55	58	32	36	4	7	80%	276.5
Nova Scotia	Heather Smith	3	5	1–1	52	55	33	32	7	7	79%	516.9
Ontario (Inglis)	Danielle Inglis	3	5	1–1	60	58	33	33	5	10	79%	568.2
New Brunswick	Melissa Adams	2	6	–	42	73	25	44	1	5	71%	562.0
Yukon	Bayly Scoffin	1	7	–	36	82	28	35	3	5	73%	1035.7

Pool A Round Robin Summary Table
Pos.	Team	(Alberta) AB	(British Columbia) BC–B	(Canada) CAN	(Manitoba) MB–L	(Newfoundland and Labrador) NL	(Northern Ontario) NO	(Prince Edward Island) PE	(Quebec) QC	(Saskatchewan) SK	Record
1	Alberta	—	8–5	8–6	7–5	7–8	10–9	8–3	8–3	8–4	7–1
5	British Columbia (Brown)	5–8	—	8–9	4–8	12–4	5–9	9–5	8–3	13–4	4–4
2	Canada	6–8	9–8	—	6–5	12–4	7–4	10–4	8–2	11–6	7–1
3	Manitoba (Lawes)	5–7	8–4	5–6	—	8–3	6–5	10–6	5–7	6–8	4–4
8	Newfoundland and Labrador	8–7	4–12	4–12	3–8	—	3–8	11–6	7–8	6–9	2–6
4	Northern Ontario	9–10	9–5	4–7	5–6	8–3	—	9–5	6–4	5–6	4–4
9	Prince Edward Island	3–8	5–9	4–10	6–10	6–11	5–9	—	6–9	8–11	0–8
7	Quebec	3–8	3–8	2–8	7–5	8–7	4–6	9–6	—	7–3	4–4
6	Saskatchewan	4–8	4–13	6–11	8–6	9–6	6–5	11–8	3–7	—	4–4

Pool B Round Robin Summary Table
Pos.	Team	(British Columbia) BC–G	(Manitoba) MB–C	(Manitoba) MB–J	(New Brunswick) NB	(Northwest Territories) NT	(Nova Scotia) NS	(Ontario) ON–H	(Ontario) ON–I	(Yukon) YT	Record
4	British Columbia (Grandy)	—	4–7	3–10	9–3	10–5	8–5	3–10	9–4	13–4	5–3
3	Manitoba (Cameron)	7–4	—	5–10	10–5	9–5	5–4	6–8	4–11	6–5	5–3
2	Manitoba (Jones)	10–3	10–5	—	11–3	4–8	7–5	5–7	7–3	14–4	6–2
8	New Brunswick	3–9	5–10	3–11	—	7–5	8–10	3–9	9–8	4–11	2–6
5	Northwest Territories	5–10	5–9	8–4	5–7	—	5–7	5–9	10–9	12–3	3–5
6	Nova Scotia	5–8	4–5	5–7	10–8	7–5	—	3–6	6–11	12–5	3–5
1	Ontario (Homan)	10–3	8–6	7–5	9–3	9–5	6–3	—	11–4	11–2	8–0
7	Ontario (Inglis)	4–9	11–4	3–7	8–9	9–10	11–6	4–11	—	10–2	3–5
9	Yukon	4–13	5–6	4–14	11–4	3–12	5–12	2–11	2–10	—	1–7

== Round robin results ==
All draw times are listed in Mountain Time (UTC−07:00).

=== Draw 1 ===
Friday, February 16, 6:00 pm

Sheet A	1	2	3	4	5	6	7	8	9	10	Final
Saskatchewan (Ackerman) 🔨	1	0	2	1	0	0	2	2	0	3	11
Prince Edward Island (DiCarlo)	0	2	0	0	4	0	0	0	2	0	8

Sheet B	1	2	3	4	5	6	7	8	9	10	Final
Alberta (Sturmay) 🔨	1	0	2	0	1	0	1	0	0	2	7
Manitoba (Lawes)	0	0	0	2	0	2	0	1	0	0	5

Sheet C	1	2	3	4	5	6	7	8	9	10	Final
Canada (Einarson) 🔨	1	2	2	1	0	1	1	0	X	X	8
Quebec (St-Georges)	0	0	0	0	1	0	0	1	X	X	2

Sheet D	1	2	3	4	5	6	7	8	9	10	Final
Northern Ontario (McCarville)	0	1	2	2	2	1	0	0	1	X	9
British Columbia (Brown) 🔨	1	0	0	0	0	0	3	1	0	X	5

=== Draw 2 ===
Saturday, February 17, 1:00 pm

Sheet A	1	2	3	4	5	6	7	8	9	10	Final
Ontario (Inglis) 🔨	1	0	0	0	0	2	0	1	0	X	4
British Columbia (Grandy)	0	1	1	1	3	0	1	0	2	X	9

Sheet B	1	2	3	4	5	6	7	8	9	10	Final
Northwest Territories (Galusha) 🔨	1	0	2	0	1	0	0	1	0	X	5
Ontario (Homan)	0	1	0	1	0	2	2	0	3	X	9

Sheet C	1	2	3	4	5	6	7	8	9	10	Final
New Brunswick (Adams)	0	0	0	0	2	1	2	0	0	X	5
Manitoba (Cameron) 🔨	0	1	4	1	0	0	0	2	2	X	10

Sheet D	1	2	3	4	5	6	7	8	9	10	Final
Nova Scotia (Smith)	0	2	0	0	0	1	1	0	1	0	5
Manitoba (Jones) 🔨	2	0	3	0	0	0	0	1	0	1	7

=== Draw 3 ===
Saturday, February 17, 6:00 pm

Sheet A	1	2	3	4	5	6	7	8	9	10	Final
British Columbia (Brown) 🔨	2	0	2	0	3	1	2	0	2	X	12
Newfoundland and Labrador (Curtis)	0	2	0	1	0	0	0	1	0	X	4

Sheet B	1	2	3	4	5	6	7	8	9	10	Final
Canada (Einarson)	0	3	0	0	0	2	0	1	1	X	7
Northern Ontario (McCarville) 🔨	0	0	1	1	0	0	2	0	0	X	4

Sheet C	1	2	3	4	5	6	7	8	9	10	Final
Alberta (Sturmay) 🔨	2	2	0	0	3	0	1	0	X	X	8
Prince Edward Island (DiCarlo)	0	0	0	0	0	2	0	1	X	X	3

Sheet D	1	2	3	4	5	6	7	8	9	10	Final
Manitoba (Lawes) 🔨	4	0	0	1	0	0	1	0	0	0	6
Saskatchewan (Ackerman)	0	2	0	0	2	1	0	2	0	1	8

=== Draw 4 ===
Sunday, February 18, 8:30 am

Sheet A	1	2	3	4	5	6	7	8	9	10	Final
Manitoba (Jones)	0	2	0	3	0	4	0	5	X	X	14
Yukon (Scoffin) 🔨	1	0	1	0	1	0	1	0	X	X	4

Sheet B	1	2	3	4	5	6	7	8	9	10	11	Final
New Brunswick (Adams)	0	1	0	1	0	0	4	0	0	2	0	8
Nova Scotia (Smith) 🔨	2	0	2	0	1	0	0	1	2	0	2	10

Sheet C	1	2	3	4	5	6	7	8	9	10	Final
Northwest Territories (Galusha) 🔨	1	0	0	1	0	3	0	0	0	0	5
British Columbia (Grandy)	0	1	1	0	2	0	2	1	0	3	10

Sheet D	1	2	3	4	5	6	7	8	9	10	Final
Ontario (Homan)	0	3	0	0	1	0	2	1	4	X	11
Ontario (Inglis) 🔨	1	0	0	2	0	1	0	0	0	X	4

=== Draw 5 ===
Sunday, February 18, 1:30 pm

Sheet A	1	2	3	4	5	6	7	8	9	10	Final
Alberta (Sturmay) 🔨	2	0	4	0	1	0	0	0	1	0	8
Canada (Einarson)	0	1	0	1	0	1	1	1	0	1	6

Sheet B	1	2	3	4	5	6	7	8	9	10	Final
Prince Edward Island (DiCarlo)	0	2	0	1	0	1	0	1	0	X	5
British Columbia (Brown) 🔨	3	0	1	0	1	0	1	0	3	X	9

Sheet C	1	2	3	4	5	6	7	8	9	10	Final
Northern Ontario (McCarville)	0	0	1	1	1	0	1	0	1	0	5
Saskatchewan (Ackerman) 🔨	0	1	0	0	0	2	0	2	0	1	6

Sheet D	1	2	3	4	5	6	7	8	9	10	Final
Quebec (St-Georges) 🔨	1	0	1	3	0	1	0	1	0	1	8
Newfoundland and Labrador (Curtis)	0	1	0	0	1	0	3	0	2	0	7

=== Draw 6 ===
Sunday, February 18, 6:30 pm

Sheet A	1	2	3	4	5	6	7	8	9	10	Final
Northwest Territories (Galusha) 🔨	1	0	0	1	1	0	0	2	0	0	5
New Brunswick (Adams)	0	2	1	0	0	1	0	0	2	1	7

Sheet B	1	2	3	4	5	6	7	8	9	10	Final
British Columbia (Grandy) 🔨	0	1	0	1	0	0	0	1	X	X	3
Manitoba (Jones)	0	0	2	0	2	2	4	0	X	X	10

Sheet C	1	2	3	4	5	6	7	8	9	10	Final
Nova Scotia (Smith)	0	2	0	2	0	1	1	0	0	X	6
Ontario (Inglis) 🔨	3	0	1	0	4	0	0	1	2	X	11

Sheet D	1	2	3	4	5	6	7	8	9	10	Final
Manitoba (Cameron) 🔨	1	0	2	0	1	0	1	0	0	1	6
Yukon (Scoffin)	0	2	0	1	0	1	0	1	0	0	5

=== Draw 7 ===
Monday, February 19, 8:30 am

Sheet A	1	2	3	4	5	6	7	8	9	10	Final
Prince Edward Island (DiCarlo) 🔨	0	2	0	0	1	0	1	0	1	X	5
Northern Ontario (McCarville)	0	0	3	3	0	2	0	1	0	X	9

Sheet B	1	2	3	4	5	6	7	8	9	10	Final
Saskatchewan (Ackerman)	0	0	1	0	1	0	1	0	0	X	3
Quebec (St-Georges) 🔨	0	2	0	2	0	1	0	1	1	X	7

Sheet C	1	2	3	4	5	6	7	8	9	10	Final
Newfoundland and Labrador (Curtis)	0	1	0	0	1	0	1	0	0	X	3
Manitoba (Lawes) 🔨	1	0	2	1	0	2	0	1	1	X	8

Sheet D	1	2	3	4	5	6	7	8	9	10	11	Final
British Columbia (Brown) 🔨	1	0	0	1	1	0	1	0	2	2	0	8
Canada (Einarson)	0	2	1	0	0	4	0	1	0	0	1	9

=== Draw 8 ===
Monday, February 19, 1:30 pm

Sheet A	1	2	3	4	5	6	7	8	9	10	Final
British Columbia (Grandy) 🔨	2	0	0	1	0	3	0	2	0	X	8
Nova Scotia (Smith)	0	1	0	0	1	0	1	0	2	X	5

Sheet B	1	2	3	4	5	6	7	8	9	10	Final
Ontario (Inglis) 🔨	0	3	1	2	0	2	0	3	X	X	11
Manitoba (Cameron)	0	0	0	0	3	0	1	0	X	X	4

Sheet C	1	2	3	4	5	6	7	8	9	10	Final
Yukon (Scoffin)	0	0	0	1	0	1	0	0	X	X	2
Ontario (Homan) 🔨	0	3	1	0	2	0	2	3	X	X	11

Sheet D	1	2	3	4	5	6	7	8	9	10	Final
Manitoba (Jones) 🔨	0	4	0	3	1	1	1	1	X	X	11
New Brunswick (Adams)	1	0	2	0	0	0	0	0	X	X	3

=== Draw 9 ===
Monday, February 19, 6:30 pm

Sheet A	1	2	3	4	5	6	7	8	9	10	Final
Manitoba (Lawes) 🔨	1	0	3	0	1	0	0	0	0	0	5
Quebec (St-Georges)	0	2	0	1	0	0	0	1	2	1	7

Sheet B	1	2	3	4	5	6	7	8	9	10	Final
Northern Ontario (McCarville) 🔨	0	1	1	0	2	0	0	3	1	X	8
Newfoundland and Labrador (Curtis)	0	0	0	2	0	1	0	0	0	X	3

Sheet C	1	2	3	4	5	6	7	8	9	10	Final
Prince Edward Island (DiCarlo)	0	1	0	1	0	1	0	1	X	X	4
Canada (Einarson) 🔨	2	0	3	0	4	0	1	0	X	X	10

Sheet D	1	2	3	4	5	6	7	8	9	10	Final
Saskatchewan (Ackerman)	0	0	0	2	1	0	1	0	0	X	4
Alberta (Sturmay) 🔨	0	1	2	0	0	2	0	2	1	X	8

=== Draw 10 ===
Tuesday, February 20, 8:30 am

Sheet A	1	2	3	4	5	6	7	8	9	10	Final
Ontario (Homan)	0	2	0	1	0	3	0	1	0	1	8
Manitoba (Cameron) 🔨	2	0	1	0	1	0	1	0	1	0	6

Sheet B	1	2	3	4	5	6	7	8	9	10	Final
Nova Scotia (Smith) 🔨	1	1	0	0	2	0	3	0	5	X	12
Yukon (Scoffin)	0	0	1	0	0	3	0	1	0	X	5

Sheet C	1	2	3	4	5	6	7	8	9	10	Final
British Columbia (Grandy) 🔨	0	2	2	1	0	2	2	0	X	X	9
New Brunswick (Adams)	0	0	0	0	2	0	0	1	X	X	3

Sheet D	1	2	3	4	5	6	7	8	9	10	Final
Ontario (Inglis) 🔨	0	2	5	0	0	0	1	1	0	0	9
Northwest Territories (Galusha)	0	0	0	2	3	1	0	0	3	1	10

=== Draw 11 ===
Tuesday, February 20, 1:30 pm

Sheet A	1	2	3	4	5	6	7	8	9	10	Final
Canada (Einarson)	0	3	0	2	0	3	0	2	1	X	11
Saskatchewan (Ackerman) 🔨	2	0	1	0	1	0	2	0	0	X	6

Sheet B	1	2	3	4	5	6	7	8	9	10	Final
Quebec (St-Georges)	0	1	0	0	1	0	1	0	X	X	3
Alberta (Sturmay) 🔨	3	0	1	1	0	2	0	1	X	X	8

Sheet C	1	2	3	4	5	6	7	8	9	10	Final
Manitoba (Lawes) 🔨	0	0	2	3	0	2	0	1	0	X	8
British Columbia (Brown)	0	0	0	0	1	0	2	0	1	X	4

Sheet D	1	2	3	4	5	6	7	8	9	10	Final
Newfoundland and Labrador (Curtis)	0	4	0	2	1	0	2	0	2	X	11
Prince Edward Island (DiCarlo) 🔨	2	0	2	0	0	1	0	1	0	X	6

=== Draw 12 ===
Tuesday, February 20, 6:30 pm

Sheet A	1	2	3	4	5	6	7	8	9	10	Final
New Brunswick (Adams) 🔨	2	0	3	0	0	3	0	0	0	1	9
Ontario (Inglis)	0	2	0	0	2	0	1	1	2	0	8

Sheet B	1	2	3	4	5	6	7	8	9	10	Final
Manitoba (Cameron)	0	3	0	0	0	2	0	1	3	X	9
Northwest Territories (Galusha) 🔨	2	0	0	1	0	0	2	0	0	X	5

Sheet C	1	2	3	4	5	6	7	8	9	10	Final
Ontario (Homan)	1	0	2	0	1	0	2	0	1	X	7
Manitoba (Jones) 🔨	0	2	0	1	0	2	0	0	0	X	5

Sheet D	1	2	3	4	5	6	7	8	9	10	Final
Yukon (Scoffin) 🔨	1	0	1	0	1	0	1	0	X	X	4
British Columbia (Grandy)	0	3	0	2	0	4	0	4	X	X	13

=== Draw 13 ===
Wednesday, February 21, 8:30 am

Sheet A	1	2	3	4	5	6	7	8	9	10	Final
Quebec (St-Georges) 🔨	0	0	0	0	1	0	2	0	X	X	3
British Columbia (Brown)	1	1	2	2	0	1	0	1	X	X	8

Sheet B	1	2	3	4	5	6	7	8	9	10	Final
Manitoba (Lawes) 🔨	2	0	1	0	4	0	0	3	0	X	10
Prince Edward Island (DiCarlo)	0	2	0	1	0	2	0	0	1	X	6

Sheet C	1	2	3	4	5	6	7	8	9	10	Final
Saskatchewan (Ackerman) 🔨	1	1	0	1	0	1	3	0	1	1	9
Newfoundland and Labrador (Curtis)	0	0	3	0	1	0	0	2	0	0	6

Sheet D	1	2	3	4	5	6	7	8	9	10	11	Final
Alberta (Sturmay)	0	1	0	0	2	0	2	1	3	0	1	10
Northern Ontario (McCarville) 🔨	2	0	2	2	0	1	0	0	0	2	0	9

=== Draw 14 ===
Wednesday, February 21, 1:30 pm

Sheet A	1	2	3	4	5	6	7	8	9	10	Final
Manitoba (Cameron) 🔨	1	0	1	0	0	2	0	1	X	X	5
Manitoba (Jones)	0	3	0	2	2	0	3	0	X	X	10

Sheet B	1	2	3	4	5	6	7	8	9	10	Final
Ontario (Homan) 🔨	0	0	2	5	0	2	0	1	X	X	10
British Columbia (Grandy)	0	0	0	0	1	0	2	0	X	X	3

Sheet C	1	2	3	4	5	6	7	8	9	10	Final
Ontario (Inglis) 🔨	3	0	1	1	0	2	0	3	X	X	10
Yukon (Scoffin)	0	0	0	0	1	0	1	0	X	X	2

Sheet D	1	2	3	4	5	6	7	8	9	10	Final
Northwest Territories (Galusha) 🔨	1	0	1	0	0	0	3	0	0	0	5
Nova Scotia (Smith)	0	2	0	1	1	1	0	1	0	1	7

=== Draw 15 ===
Wednesday, February 21, 6:30 pm

Sheet A	1	2	3	4	5	6	7	8	9	10	Final
Newfoundland and Labrador (Curtis)	0	1	2	0	2	0	1	1	0	1	8
Alberta (Sturmay) 🔨	0	0	0	2	0	3	0	0	2	0	7

Sheet B	1	2	3	4	5	6	7	8	9	10	Final
British Columbia (Brown)	0	3	2	0	3	0	2	3	X	X	13
Saskatchewan (Ackerman) 🔨	1	0	0	1	0	2	0	0	X	X	4

Sheet C	1	2	3	4	5	6	7	8	9	10	Final
Quebec (St-Georges)	0	0	1	0	1	0	1	0	1	X	4
Northern Ontario (McCarville) 🔨	2	0	0	1	0	2	0	1	0	X	6

Sheet D	1	2	3	4	5	6	7	8	9	10	Final
Canada (Einarson) 🔨	1	1	0	0	1	0	0	1	0	2	6
Manitoba (Lawes)	0	0	0	2	0	0	2	0	1	0	5

=== Draw 16 ===
Thursday, February 22, 8:30 am

Sheet A	1	2	3	4	5	6	7	8	9	10	Final
Yukon (Scoffin)	0	0	0	2	0	0	1	0	0	X	3
Northwest Territories (Galusha) 🔨	3	0	1	0	2	0	0	2	4	X	12

Sheet B	1	2	3	4	5	6	7	8	9	10	Final
Manitoba (Jones) 🔨	2	0	2	0	0	1	0	1	1	X	7
Ontario (Inglis)	0	1	0	1	1	0	0	0	0	X	3

Sheet C	1	2	3	4	5	6	7	8	9	10	Final
Manitoba (Cameron) 🔨	0	2	0	1	0	0	1	0	0	1	5
Nova Scotia (Smith)	0	0	0	0	2	0	0	0	2	0	4

Sheet D	1	2	3	4	5	6	7	8	9	10	Final
New Brunswick (Adams) 🔨	0	1	0	1	0	0	1	0	0	X	3
Ontario (Homan)	2	0	2	0	1	1	0	1	2	X	9

=== Draw 17 ===
Thursday, February 22, 1:30 pm

Sheet A	1	2	3	4	5	6	7	8	9	10	Final
Northern Ontario (McCarville)	0	1	0	1	0	1	0	1	0	1	5
Manitoba (Lawes) 🔨	1	0	1	0	0	0	3	0	1	0	6

Sheet B	1	2	3	4	5	6	7	8	9	10	Final
Newfoundland and Labrador (Curtis)	0	0	1	1	0	0	2	0	X	X	4
Canada (Einarson) 🔨	1	1	0	0	3	3	0	4	X	X	12

Sheet C	1	2	3	4	5	6	7	8	9	10	Final
British Columbia (Brown)	0	2	0	1	0	1	0	0	1	0	5
Alberta (Sturmay) 🔨	1	0	2	0	1	0	0	2	0	2	8

Sheet D	1	2	3	4	5	6	7	8	9	10	Final
Prince Edward Island (DiCarlo)	0	1	1	0	1	0	0	2	1	0	6
Quebec (St-Georges) 🔨	3	0	0	4	0	1	0	0	0	1	9

=== Draw 18 ===
Thursday, February 22, 6:30 pm

Sheet A	1	2	3	4	5	6	7	8	9	10	Final
Nova Scotia (Smith) 🔨	0	0	0	2	0	0	0	1	0	0	3
Ontario (Homan)	0	1	0	0	0	1	1	0	2	1	6

Sheet B	1	2	3	4	5	6	7	8	9	10	Final
Yukon (Scoffin)	1	0	2	0	2	1	1	1	3	X	11
New Brunswick (Adams) 🔨	0	2	0	2	0	0	0	0	0	X	4

Sheet C	1	2	3	4	5	6	7	8	9	10	Final
Manitoba (Jones)	0	0	1	1	0	1	0	1	0	X	4
Northwest Territories (Galusha) 🔨	2	1	0	0	2	0	1	0	2	X	8

Sheet D	1	2	3	4	5	6	7	8	9	10	Final
British Columbia (Grandy) 🔨	0	0	1	0	2	1	0	0	0	X	4
Manitoba (Cameron)	0	1	0	2	0	0	2	1	1	X	7

== Championship round ==
Page 1/2 Qualifier
A1 vs. B2
A1	Alberta	4
B2	Manitoba (Jones)	8

Page 3/4 Qualifier
A1 vs. A3
A1	Alberta	8
A3	Manitoba (Lawes)	5

Qualified for Playoffs
Manitoba (Jones)	To 1 vs. 2 Page
Alberta	To 3 vs. 4 Page

Page 1/2 Qualifier
B1 vs. A2
B1	Ontario (Homan)	8
A2	Canada	4

Page 3/4 Qualifier
A2 vs. B3
A2	Canada	4
B3	Manitoba (Cameron)	9

Qualified for Playoffs
Ontario (Homan)	To 1 vs. 2 Page
Manitoba (Cameron)	To 3 vs. 4 Page

=== Page 1/2 Qualifier ===
Friday, February 23, 12:00 pm

Sheet A	1	2	3	4	5	6	7	8	9	10	Final
Alberta (Sturmay) 🔨	0	2	0	1	0	1	0	0	0	X	4
Manitoba (Jones)	1	0	3	0	0	0	1	1	2	X	8

Player percentages
Alberta		Manitoba (Jones)	
Paige Papley	85%	Lauren Lenentine	92%
Dezaray Hawes	83%	Emily Zacharias	83%
Danielle Schmiemann	74%	Karlee Burgess	80%
Selena Sturmay	65%	Jennifer Jones	92%
Total	77%	Total	87%

Sheet C	1	2	3	4	5	6	7	8	9	10	Final
Ontario (Homan) 🔨	0	1	0	2	0	0	3	1	0	1	8
Canada (Einarson)	0	0	2	0	0	1	0	0	1	0	4

Player percentages
Ontario (Homan)		Canada	
Sarah Wilkes	88%	Krysten Karwacki	91%
Emma Miskew	89%	Shannon Birchard	84%
Tracy Fleury	94%	Val Sweeting	78%
Rachel Homan	90%	Kerri Einarson	82%
Total	90%	Total	84%

=== Page 3/4 Qualifier ===
Friday, February 23, 6:00 pm

Sheet A	1	2	3	4	5	6	7	8	9	10	Final
Canada (Einarson) 🔨	0	2	0	2	0	0	0	0	0	0	4
Manitoba (Cameron)	0	0	2	0	0	1	1	2	1	2	9

Player percentages
Canada		Manitoba (Cameron)	
Krysten Karwacki	95%	Mackenzie Elias	86%
Shannon Birchard	81%	Kelsey Rocque	79%
Val Sweeting	81%	Meghan Walter	86%
Kerri Einarson	71%	Kate Cameron	88%
Total	82%	Total	85%

Sheet C	1	2	3	4	5	6	7	8	9	10	Final
Alberta (Sturmay) 🔨	2	0	1	2	1	0	2	0	0	X	8
Manitoba (Lawes)	0	1	0	0	0	2	0	1	1	X	5

Player percentages
Alberta		Manitoba (Lawes)	
Paige Papley	95%	Kristin MacCuish	98%
Dezaray Hawes	84%	Jocelyn Peterman	59%
Danielle Schmiemann	79%	Selena Njegovan	84%
Selena Sturmay	89%	Kaitlyn Lawes	67%
Total	87%	Total	77%

== Playoffs ==
Page playoff system
1	Ontario (Homan)	6
2	Manitoba (Jones)	4
3	Alberta	4
4	Manitoba (Cameron)	6

Semifinal
2	Manitoba (Jones)	12
4	Manitoba (Cameron)	7

Final
1	Ontario (Homan)	5
2	Manitoba (Jones)	4

=== 1 vs. 2 ===
Saturday, February 24, 6:00 pm

Sheet B	1	2	3	4	5	6	7	8	9	10	11	Final
Ontario (Homan) 🔨	1	0	0	2	0	0	0	0	0	1	2	6
Manitoba (Jones)	0	0	1	0	1	1	0	1	0	0	0	4

Player percentages
Ontario (Homan)		Manitoba (Jones)	
Sarah Wilkes	85%	Lauren Lenentine	90%
Emma Miskew	89%	Emily Zacharias	90%
Tracy Fleury	84%	Karlee Burgess	83%
Rachel Homan	80%	Jennifer Jones	74%
Total	84%	Total	84%

=== 3 vs. 4 ===
Saturday, February 24, 12:00 pm

Sheet B	1	2	3	4	5	6	7	8	9	10	Final
Alberta (Sturmay) 🔨	1	0	0	0	1	0	1	0	1	X	4
Manitoba (Cameron)	0	0	3	1	0	1	0	1	0	X	6

Player percentages
Alberta		Manitoba (Cameron)	
Paige Papley	91%	Mackenzie Elias	91%
Dezaray Hawes	81%	Kelsey Rocque	85%
Danielle Schmiemann	94%	Meghan Walter	93%
Selena Sturmay	68%	Kate Cameron	91%
Total	84%	Total	90%

=== Semifinal ===
Sunday, February 25, 12:00 pm

Sheet B	1	2	3	4	5	6	7	8	9	10	Final
Manitoba (Jones) 🔨	5	0	2	0	2	0	2	0	1	X	12
Manitoba (Cameron)	0	2	0	2	0	1	0	2	0	X	7

Player percentages
Manitoba (Jones)		Manitoba (Cameron)	
Lauren Lenentine	93%	Mackenzie Elias	92%
Emily Zacharias	85%	Kelsey Rocque	65%
Karlee Burgess	76%	Meghan Walter	61%
Jennifer Jones	71%	Kate Cameron	76%
Total	81%	Total	74%

=== Final ===
Sunday, February 25, 6:00 pm

Sheet B	1	2	3	4	5	6	7	8	9	10	Final
Ontario (Homan) 🔨	0	1	0	1	1	0	0	1	0	1	5
Manitoba (Jones)	0	0	1	0	0	0	1	0	2	0	4

Player percentages
Ontario (Homan)		Manitoba (Jones)	
Sarah Wilkes	91%	Lauren Lenentine	85%
Emma Miskew	83%	Emily Zacharias	78%
Tracy Fleury	85%	Karlee Burgess	76%
Rachel Homan	88%	Jennifer Jones	72%
Total	87%	Total	78%

== Statistics ==
=== Top 5 player percentages ===
Round Robin only; minimum 5 games played

Key
First All-Star Team
Second All-Star Team

Leads	%
(Ontario) (H) Sarah Wilkes	89
(Northern Ontario) Sarah Potts	89
(Canada) Krysten Karwacki	89
(Manitoba) (J) Lauren Lenentine	88
(Northwest Territories) Kerry Galusha (Skip)	87

Seconds	%
(Canada) Shannon Birchard	89
(Ontario) (H) Emma Miskew	86
(Manitoba) (L) Jocelyn Peterman	86
(Alberta) Dezaray Hawes	85
(British Columbia) (B) Jennifer Armstrong	85

Thirds	%
(Ontario) (H) Tracy Fleury	89
(Manitoba) (J) Karlee Burgess	84
(Alberta) Danielle Schmiemann	83
(Ontario) (I) Kira Brunton	83
(Canada) Val Sweeting	83

Skips	%
(Ontario) (H) Rachel Homan	91
(Canada) Kerri Einarson	82
(Manitoba) (J) Jennifer Jones	81
(Manitoba) (L) Kaitlyn Lawes	81
(British Columbia) (G) Clancy Grandy	79

=== Perfect games ===
Round robin only; minimum 10 shots thrown

Player	Team	Position	Shots	Opponent
Sarah Wilkes	Ontario (Homan)	Lead	12	Yukon
Mackenzie Elias	Manitoba (Cameron)	Lead	16	Ontario (Inglis)
Rachel Homan	Ontario (Homan)	Skip	16	British Columbia (Grandy)

== Awards ==
=== All-Star teams ===
The All-Star Teams were determined by a combination of media vote and playing percentages:

Robin Wilson First Team
Position	Name	Team
Skip	Rachel Homan	Ontario (Homan)
Third	Tracy Fleury	Ontario (Homan)
Second	Emma Miskew	Ontario (Homan)
Lead	Krysten Karwacki	Canada

Second Team
Position	Name	Team
Skip	Kerri Einarson	Canada
Third	Karlee Burgess	Manitoba (Jones)
Second	Shannon Birchard	Canada
Lead	Sarah Wilkes	Ontario (Homan)

=== Marj Mitchell Sportsmanship Award ===
The Marj Mitchell Sportsmanship Award was presented to the player chosen by their fellow peers as the curler that most exemplified sportsmanship and dedication to curling during the annual Scotties Tournament of Hearts.

Name	Position	Team
Danielle Inglis	Skip	Ontario (Inglis)

=== Sandra Schmirler Most Valuable Player Award ===
The Sandra Schmirler Most Valuable Player Award was awarded to the top player in the playoff round by members of the media in the Scotties Tournament of Hearts.

Name	Position	Team
Rachel Homan (3)	Skip	Ontario (Homan)

=== Paul McLean Award ===
The Paul McLean Award is presented by TSN to a person behind the scenes who has made a significant contribution to the sport of curling.

- Donna Spencer – Journalist for The Canadian Press who has covered curling since 1999 – totaling 16 Scotties, 13 world championships, 9 Briers and 3 Winter Olympics.

== Provincial and territorial playdowns ==
- 2024 Alberta Scotties Tournament of Hearts: January 24–28
- 2024 British Columbia Scotties Tournament of Hearts: January 23–28
- 2024 Manitoba Scotties Tournament of Hearts: January 24–28
- 2024 New Brunswick Scotties Tournament of Hearts: January 17–21
- 2024 Newfoundland and Labrador Scotties Tournament of Hearts: January 25–28
- 2024 Northern Ontario Scotties Tournament of Hearts: January 25–28
- 2024 Northwest Territories Scotties Tournament of Hearts: January 17–21
- 2024 Nova Scotia Scotties Tournament of Hearts: January 17–21
- 2024 Ontario Scotties Tournament of Hearts: January 22–26
- 2024 Prince Edward Island Scotties Tournament of Hearts: January 25–28
- 2024 Quebec Scotties Tournament of Hearts: January 24–28
- 2024 Saskatchewan Scotties Tournament of Hearts: January 17–21
- 2024 Yukon Scotties Tournament of Hearts: January 11–14: Three teams competed; (Bayly Scoffin, Kerry Foster, Raelyn Helston, Kimberly Tuor; Lorna Spenner, Laini Klassen, Laura Wilson, Laura Williamson; and Patty Wallingham, Kelsey Meger, Shelby Jensen, Emily Matthews). Scoffin finished the double round robin with a 3–1 record, Wallingham with 2–2 and Spenner with 1–3. Scoffin beat Wallingham in a playoff to win the championship.
