= New Scotland Brewing Co. Cashspiel =

- Established: 2015
- Host city: Halifax, Nova Scotia
- Arena: CFB Halifax Curling Club
- Men's purse: $4,000
- Women's purse: $3,500

Current champions (2023)
- Men: (New Brunswick) James Grattan
- Women: (New Brunswick) Melissa Adams

The New Scotland Brewing Co. Cashspiel is a cashspiel, or curling tournament held each year at the CFB Halifax Curling Club In Halifax, Nova Scotia. The women's event was previously called the New Scotland Clothing Ladies Cashspiel and the men's event was previously called the New Scotland Brewing Men's Cash Spiel. The men's event was called the Bud Light Men's Cashspiel until 2019.

== Past champions ==
=== Men ===
Year	Winning team	Runner up team	Purse (CAD)
2015	(Nova Scotia) Stuart Thompson, Colten Steele, Travis Colter, Alex MacNeil	(Nova Scotia) Jamie Danbrook, Kendal Thompson, Bryce Everist, Brendan Lavell	$5,000
2016	(Nova Scotia) Chad Stevens, Cameron MacKenzie, Ian Juurlink, Kelly Mittelstadt	(Nova Scotia) Stuart Thompson, Colten Steele, Travis Colter, Alex MacNeil	$7,350
2017	(Nova Scotia) Robert Mayhew, Chris MacRae, Neil Gallant, Nick Burdock	(Nova Scotia) Owen Purcell, Graeme Weagle, Brett Dorey, Jeffery Meagher	$6,400
2018	(Nova Scotia) Kendal Thompson, Bryce Everist, Chris MacRae, Michael Brophy	(Nova Scotia) Chad Stevens, Peter Burgess, Graham Breckon, Kelly Mittelstadt	$6,400
2019	(Nova Scotia) Chad Stevens, Peter Burgess, Graham Breckon, Kelly Mittelstadt	(Nova Scotia) Brent MacDougall, Martin Gavin, Paul Dexter, Kirk MacDiarmid	$6,400
2020	Cancelled		
2021	Cancelled		
2022	(Nova Scotia) Owen Purcell, Joel Krats, Adam McEachran, Scott Weagle	(Nova Scotia) Matthew Manuel, Luke Saunders, Jeffrey Meagher, Nick Zachernuk	$7,500
2023	(New Brunswick) James Grattan, Joel Krats, Paul Dobson, Andy McCann	(Nova Scotia) Nick Mosher, Sean Beland, Owen McPherson, Aidan MacDonald	$4,000

=== Women ===
Year	Winning team	Runner up team	Purse (CAD)
2015	(Nova Scotia) Mary Fay, Kristin Clarke, Karlee Burgess, Janique LeBlanc	(Nova Scotia) Mary Mattatall, Marg Cutcliffe, Jill Alcoe-Holland, Andrea Saulnier	$4,675
2016	(Nova Scotia) Kristen MacDiarmid, Kelly Backman, Liz Woodworth, Julia Williams	(Nova Scotia) Theresa Breen, Tanya Hilliard, Jocelyn Adams, Amanda Simpson	$7,350
2017	(Nova Scotia) Kaitlyn Jones, Kristin Clarke, Karlee Burgess, Lindsey Burgess	(Nova Scotia) Jill Brothers, Erin Carmody, Sarah Murphy, Jenn Brine	$5,200
2018	(Nova Scotia) Mary-Anne Arsenault, Christina Black, Jenn Baxter, Kristin Clarke	(Nova Scotia) Mary Myketyn-Driscoll, Brigitte MacPhail, Kaitlyn Veitch, Michelle McDonald	$6,400
2019	(Nova Scotia) Mary Mattatall, Marg Cutcliffe, Jill Alcoe-Holland, Andrea Saulnier	(Nova Scotia) Tanya Hilliard, Taylor Clarke, MacKenzie Proctor, Heather MacPhee	$5,000
2020	Cancelled		
2021	Cancelled		
2022	(Nova Scotia) Christina Black, Jenn Baxter, Karlee Everist, Shelley Barker	(Nova Scotia) Tanya Hilliard, Taylor Clarke, MacKenzie Feindel, Heather MacPhee	$5,000
2023	(New Brunswick) Melissa Adams, Jaclyn Crandall, Molli Ward, Kayla Russell	(Nova Scotia) Marie Christianson, Jill Brothers, Heather Smith, Erin Carmody	$3,500
