= Molli Ward =

Canadian curler

- Curler
- Born: December 10, 1999 (age 26); Sackville, New Brunswick

Team
- Curling club: Sackville CC, Sackville, NB

Curling career
- Member Association: New Brunswick
- Hearts: 2 (2024, 2025)
- Top CTRS ranking: 47th (2023–24)

Molli Ward (born December 10, 1999) is a Canadian curler from Sackville, New Brunswick.

== Career ==
Throughout her junior career, Ward played second on the Shaelyn Park and Samantha Crook rinks but never won the New Brunswick junior championship. In 2017, Team Park competed in the 2017 New Brunswick Scotties Tournament of Hearts where they finished in sixth place with a 1–5 record. The following year, now with Team Crook, they finished in fifth at the 2018 New Brunswick Scotties Tournament of Hearts, this time going 2–3. The team also finished runner-up at the 2018 junior provincial championship, falling to the Justine Comeau rink.

In her last year of junior eligibility, Samantha Crook aged out and Julia Hunter took over skipping duties for the team. They finished with a 3–3 record at the provincial championship, losing out to Erica Cluff. Team Crook again competed in the 2019 New Brunswick Scotties Tournament of Hearts where they missed the playoffs, going 2–3. In February, the Mount Allison Mounties finished second at the 2019 Atlantic University Sport Curling Championships, qualifying the team for the 2019 U Sports/Curling Canada University Championships. There, they finished sixth with a 2–5 record, earning wins against the UNB Reds and the Regina Cougars.

After taking a few years off, Ward joined the Jaclyn Crandall rink at second with third Kendra Lister and lead Kayla Russell for the 2022–23 season. The team reached the quarterfinals of the Jim Sullivan Curling Classic where they lost to the Jessica Daigle rink. Entering the 2023 New Brunswick Scotties Tournament of Hearts as the second seeds, the team finished 3–3 through the round robin, enough to earn them a spot in the tiebreaker. There, they were defeated by Ward's former teammate Shaelyn Park.

Melissa Adams joined the team for the 2023–24 season as their new skip, shifting Crandall to third, Lister to lead and Russell to alternate. On tour, the team went undefeated to pick up victories at the New Scotland Brewing Co. Cashspiel and the Jim Sullivan Curling Classic, defeating the Heather Smith rink in both finals. At the 2024 New Brunswick Scotties Tournament of Hearts, Team Adams won the A qualifier event before losing both the B and C events to Mélodie Forsythe and Sylvie Quillian respectively. In the playoffs, they beat Team Forsythe 8–4 in the semifinal before defeating Team Quillian 7–4 in the provincial final. This earned the team the right to represent New Brunswick at the 2024 Scotties Tournament of Hearts, Ward's first appearance at the national women's championship. There, they finished eighth in Pool B with a 2–6 record, defeating the Northwest Territories' Kerry Galusha and Ontario's Danielle Inglis.

== Personal life ==
Ward is employed as a financial controller at JN Lafford Realty Inc. She previously attended Mount Allison University.

== Teams ==
Season	Skip	Third	Second	Lead	Alternate
2015–16	Shaelyn Park	Julia Goodin	Molli Ward	Lauren Whiteway	
2016–17	Shaelyn Park	Julia Goodin	Molli Ward	Lauren Whiteway	
2017–18	Samantha Crook	Julia Hunter	Molli Ward	Kayla Russell	Shelby Wilson
2018–19	Samantha Crook	Julia Hunter	Molli Ward	Kayla Russell	
2022–23	Jaclyn Crandall	Kendra Lister	Molli Ward	Kayla Russell	Melissa Adams
2023–24	Melissa Adams	Jaclyn Crandall	Molli Ward	Kendra Lister	Kayla Russell
2024–25	Melissa Adams	Jaclyn Crandall	Kayla Russell	Kendra Lister	Molli Ward
