= Kendra Lister =

Canadian curler (born 1987)

- Curler
- Born: Kendra Dickison; October 4, 1987 (age 39); Miramichi, New Brunswick

Team
- Curling club: Capital Winter Club, Fredericton, NB

Curling career
- Member Association: New Brunswick
- Hearts: 4 (2018, 2021, 2024, 2025)
- Top CTRS ranking: 47th (2023–24)

Kendra Lister (born October 4, 1987 as Kendra Dickison) is a Canadian curler from Fredericton, New Brunswick.

== Career ==
=== Women's ===
Lister joined the Quillian (Robichaud at the time) rink after the 2016–17 season. Her team consisted of skip Robichaud, third Melissa Adams who also just joined the team and second Nicole Arsenault Bishop. The team had early success winning the Jim Sullivan Curling Classic World Curling Tour event. Their successes continued into January when they won the 2018 New Brunswick Scotties Tournament of Hearts, earning the right to represent New Brunswick at the 2018 Scotties Tournament of Hearts. It was Lister's first provincial women's title. The Quillian rink would have a very successful tournament, finishing the new pool play format with a 4–3 record. They won their final seeding game to finish the tournament with a 5–3 record. The following season, her team won the Tim Hortons Spitfire Arms Cash Spiel on the World Curling Tour. They could not defend their provincial title at the 2019 New Brunswick Scotties Tournament of Hearts where they lost to the Sarah Mallais rink in the semifinal.

After failing to win the provincial championship in 2020 as well, Team Quillian disbanded and Lister joined Melissa Adams' new team with Justine Comeau at third and Jaclyn Crandall at second. Due to the COVID-19 pandemic in New Brunswick, the 2021 provincial championship was cancelled. As the reigning provincial champions, Team Crawford was given the invitation to represent New Brunswick at the 2021 Scotties Tournament of Hearts, but they declined due to work and family commitments. Team Adams was then invited in their place, which they accepted. One member of Team Adams, Justine Comeau, opted to not attend the Scotties, with Nicole Arsenault Bishop stepping in to play second on the team. At the Hearts, they finished with a 3–5 round robin record, failing to qualify for the championship round.

After taking a year off, Lister and Jaclyn Crandall formed a new team for the 2022–23 season with second Molli Ward and lead Kayla Russell. The team reached the quarterfinals of the Jim Sullivan Curling Classic where they lost to the Jessica Daigle rink. Entering the 2023 New Brunswick Scotties Tournament of Hearts as the second seeds, the team finished 3–3 through the round robin, enough to earn them a spot in the tiebreaker. There, they were defeated 8–6 by Shaelyn Park.

Melissa Adams rejoined the team for the 2023–24 season as their new skip, shifting Crandall to third, Lister to lead and Russell to alternate. On tour, the team went undefeated to pick up victories at the New Scotland Brewing Co. Cashspiel and the Jim Sullivan Curling Classic, defeating the Heather Smith rink in both finals. At the 2024 New Brunswick Scotties Tournament of Hearts, Team Adams won the A qualifier event before losing both the B and C events to Mélodie Forsythe and Sylvie Quillian respectively. In the playoffs, they beat Team Forsythe 8–4 in the semifinal before defeating Team Quillian 7–4 in the provincial final. This earned the team the right to represent New Brunswick at the 2024 Scotties Tournament of Hearts. There, they finished eighth in Pool B with a 2–6 record, defeating the Northwest Territories' Kerry Galusha and Ontario's Danielle Inglis.

=== Mixed doubles ===
Lister played mixed doubles with her husband Daniel Lister. The duo finished 4–2 at the 2019 New Brunswick Mixed Doubles Championship, losing out in the qualification playoff game. They made it one stage further at the 2020 championship, losing out in the quarterfinals. At the 2021 provincial championship, they lost out in the C event final.

== Personal life ==
Lister is employed as a performance auditor. She has two children.

== Teams ==
Season	Skip	Third	Second	Lead	Alternate
2010–11	Sylvie Robichaud	Danielle Nicholson	Marie Richard	Kendra Dickison	
2011–12	Sylvie Robichaud	Danielle Nicholson	Marie Richard	Kendra Lister	Denise Nowlan
2012–13	Sylvie Robichaud	Danielle Amos	Marie Richard	Kendra Lister	Denise Nowlan
2014–15	Melissa Adams	Danielle Amos	Nicole Arsenault Bishop	Kendra Lister	
2015–16	Melissa Adams	Jennifer Armstrong	Cathlia Ward	Kendra Lister	
2017–18	Sylvie Robichaud	Melissa Adams	Nicole Arsenault Bishop	Kendra Lister	
2018–19	Sylvie Robichaud	Melissa Adams	Nicole Arsenault Bishop	Kendra Lister	Jaclyn Crandall
2019–20	Sylvie Quillian	Melissa Adams	Nicole Arsenault Bishop	Kendra Lister	Jaclyn Tingley
2020–21	Melissa Adams	Justine Comeau	Jaclyn Tingley	Kendra Lister	Nicole Arsenault Bishop
2022–23	Jaclyn Crandall	Kendra Lister	Molli Ward	Kayla Russell	Melissa Adams
2023–24	Melissa Adams	Jaclyn Crandall	Molli Ward	Kendra Lister	Kayla Russell
2024–25	Melissa Adams	Jaclyn Crandall	Kayla Russell	Kendra Lister	Molli Ward
2025–26	Melissa Adams	Jaclyn Crandall	Cayla Auld	Kendra Lister	Kayla Russell
