= Melissa Adams =

Canadian curler (born 1977)

- Curler
- Born: Melissa McClure; December 16, 1977 (age 48); Grand Falls, New Brunswick, Canada

Team
- Curling club: Capital Winter Club, Fredericton, NB
- Mixed doubles partner: Alex Robichaud

Curling career
- Member Association: New Brunswick
- Hearts: 6 (2009, 2017, 2018, 2021, 2024, 2025)
- Top CTRS ranking: 47th (2023–24)
Medal record
Curling
Representing Canada
World Junior Championships
Gold medal – first place	1998 Thunder Bay
Representing New Brunswick
Canadian Mixed Doubles Championship
Bronze medal – third place	2025 Summerside
Canada Winter Games
Bronze medal – third place	1995 Grande Prairie

Melissa Adams (born December 16, 1977, in Grand Falls, New Brunswick, as Melissa McClure) is a Canadian curler from Fredericton, New Brunswick. She is a former Canadian and World Junior champion skip.

== Career ==
=== Juniors ===
Adams first national championship appearance was at the 1995 Canada Winter Games where she played for New Brunswick, winning a bronze medal. She also won two New Brunswick High School championships in 1993 and 1994. Adams would then go on to skip New Brunswick at three straight Canadian Junior Curling Championships. At the 1996 Canadian Junior Curling Championships, Adams led her New Brunswick team of Nancy Toner, Brigitte McClure and Bethany Toner to a 6–6 round robin record, missing the playoffs. At the 1997 Canadian Junior Curling Championships, she led her team to an improved 7–5 record, but again missed the playoffs. At the 1998 Canadian Junior Curling Championships, she led her team to a 10–2 round robin record, good enough for second place. In the semifinals, she beat Prince Edward Island's Suzanne Gaudet rink and then in the finals, she beat Ontario's Jenn Hanna to claim the championship. Adams would then represent Canada at the 1998 World Junior Curling Championships. There, she led her team to a 7–2 round robin record, in second place. In the semifinals, she beat Scotland's Julia Ewart rink, and then downed Japan's Akiko Katoh rink in the final to win the gold medal.

=== Women's ===
Adams has had less success in her post-junior career. She would not win a provincial women's championship until 2017 with teammates Jennifer Armstrong, Cathlia Ward and Katie Forward. They represented New Brunswick at the 2017 Scotties Tournament of Hearts, where they failed to make it out of the pre-qualifying tournament. After going 3–0 in the tournament, she lost in the pre-qualifying final to the Northwest Territories, and did not play in the main event. The next season, Adams joined the Sylvie Robichaud rink, which would win the 2018 New Brunswick Scotties Tournament of Hearts. At the 2018 Scotties Tournament of Hearts, the team finished the new pool play format with a 4–3 record. This placed them fifth in their pool, not enough to qualify for the Championship Pool. In addition to her appearances at the 2017 and 2018 Hearts, Adams was the alternate for Team New Brunswick (skipped by Andrea Kelly) at the 2009 Scotties Tournament of Hearts, though she did not play in any games.

On the World Curling Tour, Adams has played in one career Grand Slam event, the 2010 Sobeys Slam, losing all three of her games. She has won the WFG Jim Sullivan Curling Classic twice, in 2015 and 2017.

After failing to win the provincial championship in back to back years, Team Quillian disbanded and Adams formed her own team of Justine Comeau, Jaclyn Crandall and Kendra Lister. Due to the COVID-19 pandemic in New Brunswick, the 2021 provincial championship was cancelled. As the reigning provincial champions, Team Crawford was given the invitation to represent New Brunswick at the 2021 Scotties Tournament of Hearts, but they declined due to work and family commitments. Team Adams was then invited in their place, which they accepted. One member of Adams' rink, Justine Comeau, opted to not attend the Scotties, with Nicole Arsenault-Bishop stepping in to play second on the team. At the Hearts, Adams led her team to a 3–5 round robin record, failing to qualify for the championship round.

Adams joined the new Jaclyn Crandall rink with third Kendra Lister, second Molli Ward and lead Kayla Russell as their alternate for the 2023 New Brunswick Scotties Tournament of Hearts. The team finished 3–3 through the round robin, enough to earn them a spot in the tiebreaker. There, they were defeated 8–6 by Shaelyn Park.

The following season, Adams took over as skip, shifting Crandall to third, Lister to lead and Russell to alternate. On tour, the team went undefeated to pick up victories at the New Scotland Brewing Co. Cashspiel and the Jim Sullivan Curling Classic, defeating the Heather Smith rink in both finals. At the 2024 New Brunswick Scotties Tournament of Hearts, Team Adams won the A qualifier event before losing both the B and C events to Mélodie Forsythe and Sylvie Quillian respectively. In the playoffs, they beat Team Forsythe 8–4 in the semifinal before defeating Team Quillian 7–4 in the provincial final. This earned the team the right to represent New Brunswick at the 2024 Scotties Tournament of Hearts where Adams led the team to a 2–6 record, defeating the Northwest Territories' Kerry Galusha and Ontario's Danielle Inglis.

=== Mixed doubles ===
Adams began playing mixed doubles curling with Alex Robichaud in 2018. The duo won their first World Curling Tour event in 2019 by winning the Goldline Clermont Mixed Doubles. In 2021, they finished second at the New Brunswick Mixed Doubles Curling Championship, however, would go on to represent New Brunswick at the Canadian championship after the winners Leah Thompson and Charlie Sullivan forfeited their spot due to travel requirements. At the 2021 Canadian Mixed Doubles Curling Championship, the pair finished with a 1–5 record, defeating Nunavut in their sole victory. Adams and Robichaud again won the New Brunswick championship the following year, however, did not get to go to the national championship as it was cancelled. They also won a second tour event at the Fredericton Mixed Doubles.

Despite not repeating as provincial champions in 2023, Adams and Robichaud still qualified for the 2023 Canadian Mixed Doubles Curling Championship based on their points accumulated throughout the year. At the championship, the team placed fifth in their pool with a 3–4 record. They also defended their title at the Fredericton Mixed Doubles that season and won the Goldline Mixed Doubles Rivière-du-Loup, picking up two more tour titles. The following season, the pair won back their provincial title and represented New Brunswick on home ice at the 2024 Canadian Mixed Doubles Curling Championship where they finished with a 2–5 record.

To begin the 2024–25 season, Adams and Robichaud reached the final of the Goldline Omnium Services Financiers Richard April, losing to Marlee Powers and Luke Saunders. In December, the team competed in the Rocky Mountain Mixed Doubles Classic which doubled as the final Olympic Trials direct-entry qualifier. There, the team had a strong run, qualifying for the playoffs through the B side before losing to Jennifer Jones and Brent Laing in the quarterfinals. Despite this, their finish gave them enough points to qualify for the 2025 Canadian Mixed Doubles Curling Olympic Trials, becoming the first mixed doubles team with both players from New Brunswick to do so. There, they finished seventh in their pool with a 2–5 record. Adams and Robichaud also qualified for the 2025 Canadian Mixed Doubles Curling Championship, where they had success, finishing tied for 3rd after losing to Powers and Saunders 5–4 in the semifinals.

== Personal life ==
Adams is Acadian, and is married to Todd Adams and has three children. She works as a policy and programs leader for the Canadian Food Inspection Agency.

Her junior team was inducted into the New Brunswick Sports Hall of Fame in 2004.
