= Kayla Russell =

Canadian curler

- Curler
- Born: May 3, 1998 (age 28); Miramichi, New Brunswick

Team
- Curling club: Miramichi CC, Miramichi, NB

Curling career
- Member Association: New Brunswick
- Hearts: 2 (2024, 2025)
- Top CTRS ranking: 47th (2023–24)

Kayla Russell (born May 5, 1998, in Miramichi) is a Canadian curler from Strathadam, New Brunswick.

== Career ==
Russell played lead throughout her junior career as a member of the Samantha Crook rink. In 2017, her team with Crook, third Julia Hunter and second Danielle Hubbard won the New Brunswick junior provincial championship, going undefeated to claim the title. This included defeating the defending champions Team Justine Comeau in the final, who won bronze at the previous Canadian junior championship. At the 2017 Canadian Junior Curling Championships, the team finished tied for fourth place in their pool with a 3–3 record. This forced them to play a tiebreaker against Northern Ontario's Krysta Burns, which they lost 8–5. They finished the event in eleventh place with a 4–5 record. Russell later won a silver medal in the mixed doubles competition.

The following year, Hubbard aged out of juniors and the team added Molli Ward as their new second. At the 2018 New Brunswick Scotties Tournament of Hearts, their first women's provincial championship, the team finished in fifth with a 2–3 record. They would not return to the Canadian juniors, however, falling to the Justine Comeau rink 6–5 in the semifinal. In her last year of junior eligibility, Samantha Crook aged out and Julia Hunter took over skipping duties for the team. They finished with a 3–3 record at the provincial championship, losing out to Erica Cluff. Team Crook again competed in the 2019 New Brunswick Scotties Tournament of Hearts where they missed the playoffs, going 2–3.

After taking a few years off, Russell joined the Jaclyn Crandall rink at lead with third Kendra Lister and second Molli Ward for the 2022–23 season. The team reached the quarterfinals of the Jim Sullivan Curling Classic where they lost to the Jessica Daigle rink. Entering the 2023 New Brunswick Scotties Tournament of Hearts as the second seeds, the team finished 3–3 through the round robin, enough to earn them a spot in the tiebreaker. There, they were defeated 8–6 by Shaelyn Park.

Melissa Adams joined the team for the 2023–24 season as their new skip, shifting Crandall to third, Lister to lead and Russell to alternate. On tour, the team went undefeated to pick up victories at the New Scotland Brewing Co. Cashspiel and the Jim Sullivan Curling Classic, defeating the Heather Smith rink in both finals. At the 2024 New Brunswick Scotties Tournament of Hearts, Team Adams won the A qualifier event before losing both the B and C events to Mélodie Forsythe and Sylvie Quillian respectively. In the playoffs, they beat Team Forsythe 8–4 in the semifinal before defeating Team Quillian 7–4 in the provincial final. This earned the team the right to represent New Brunswick at the 2024 Scotties Tournament of Hearts, Russell's first appearance at the national women's championship. There, they finished eighth in Pool B with a 2–6 record, defeating the Northwest Territories' Kerry Galusha and Ontario's Danielle Inglis. Russell got to play in the team's final round robin game against the Yukon's Bayly Scoffin, replacing Lister at lead.

== Personal life ==
Russell is employed as a server at Mike's Bar & Grill. She has one daughter.

== Teams ==
Season	Skip	Third	Second	Lead	Alternate
2013–14	Samantha Crook	Julia Hunter	Danielle Hubbard	Kayla Russell	
2014–15	Samantha Crook	Julia Hunter	Danielle Hubbard	Kayla Russell	
2015–16	Samantha Crook	Julia Hunter	Danielle Hubbard	Kayla Russell	
2016–17	Samantha Crook	Julia Hunter	Danielle Hubbard	Kayla Russell	Shelby Wilson
2017–18	Samantha Crook	Julia Hunter	Molli Ward	Kayla Russell	Shelby Wilson
2018–19	Samantha Crook	Julia Hunter	Molli Ward	Kayla Russell	
2022–23	Jaclyn Crandall	Kendra Lister	Molli Ward	Kayla Russell	Melissa Adams
2023–24	Melissa Adams	Jaclyn Crandall	Molli Ward	Kendra Lister	Kayla Russell
2024–25	Melissa Adams	Jaclyn Crandall	Kayla Russell	Kendra Lister	Molli Ward
2025–26	Melissa Adams	Jaclyn Crandall	Cayla Auld	Kendra Lister	Kayla Russell
