= Jaclyn Crandall =

Canadian curler (born 1989)

- Curler
- Other names: Jaclyn Tingley
- Born: April 4, 1989 (age 37); Fredericton, New Brunswick

Team
- Curling club: Capital Winter Club, Fredericton, NB
- Skip: Mélodie Forsythe
- Third: Rebecca Watson
- Second: Carly Smith
- Lead: Jenna Campbell
- Alternate: Jaclyn Crandall

Curling career
- Member Association: New Brunswick
- Hearts: 3 (2021, 2024, 2025)
- Top CTRS ranking: 47th (2023–24)

Jaclyn Lora Crandall (born April 4, 1989), previously known as Jaclyn Tingley, is a Canadian curler from Fredericton, New Brunswick. She is currently the alternate on Team Mélodie Forsythe.

== Career ==
Crandall played in her first provincial championship during the 2009–10 season as third for Ashley Howard. The team made it to the final of the 2010 New Brunswick Scotties Tournament of Hearts, where they lost to Andrea Crawford 8–5. The team won the 2010 Lady Monctonian Invitational Spiel to start the 2010–11 season. They would however not qualify at provincials that year, finishing the round robin with a 2–5 record. After the season, Tingley joined the Melissa Adams rink. The team qualified for the provincial final at the 2013 New Brunswick Scotties Tournament of Hearts, where they would lose to the Crawford rink 13–6.

Crandall made her first national appearance at the 2014 CIS/CCA Curling Championships playing as third for Jennifer Armstrong. The team finished in last place with a 1–6 record.

After taking a few seasons off, Crandall joined the Sylvie Quillian rink as their alternate for the 2018–19 season. Team Quillian qualified for the playoffs at both the 2019 and 2020 provincial championships, losing in the semifinal in 2019 and final in 2020. After the 2019–20 season, Quillian joined the Andrea Crawford team and Melissa Adams took over as skip of the team with Crandall moving up to second. Due to the COVID-19 pandemic in New Brunswick, the 2021 provincial championship was cancelled. As the reigning provincial champions, Team Crawford was given the invitation to represent New Brunswick at the 2021 Scotties Tournament of Hearts, but they declined due to work and family commitments. Team Adams was then invited in their place, which they accepted. One member of Team Adams, Justine Comeau, opted to not attend the Scotties, with Nicole Arsenault Bishop stepping in to play second on the team. At the Hearts, they finished with a 3–5 round robin record, failing to qualify for the championship round.

After taking a year off, Crandall formed a new team for the 2022–23 season with third Kendra Lister, second Molli Ward and lead Kayla Russell. The team reached the quarterfinals of the Jim Sullivan Curling Classic where they lost to the Jessica Daigle rink. Entering the 2023 New Brunswick Scotties Tournament of Hearts as the second seeds, the team finished 3–3 through the round robin, enough to earn them a spot in the tiebreaker. There, they were defeated 8–6 by Shaelyn Park.

Melissa Adams rejoined the team for the 2023–24 season as their new skip, shifting Crandall to third, Lister to lead and Russell to alternate. On tour, the team went undefeated to pick up victories at the New Scotland Brewing Co. Cashspiel and the Jim Sullivan Curling Classic, defeating the Heather Smith rink in both finals. At the 2024 New Brunswick Scotties Tournament of Hearts, Team Adams won the A qualifier event before losing both the B and C events to Mélodie Forsythe and Sylvie Quillian respectively. In the playoffs, they beat Team Forsythe 8–4 in the semifinal before defeating Team Quillian 7–4 in the provincial final. This earned the team the right to represent New Brunswick at the 2024 Scotties Tournament of Hearts. There, they finished eighth in Pool B with a 2–6 record, defeating the Northwest Territories' Kerry Galusha and Ontario's Danielle Inglis.

== Personal life ==
Crandall is employed as a teacher with the Anglophone West School District. She has a son, Adam. She graduated from the University of New Brunswick.

== Teams ==
Season	Skip	Third	Second	Lead	Alternate
2009–10	Ashley Howard	Jaclyn Crandall	Melissa Menzies	Emily MacRae	
2010–11	Ashley Howard	Jaclyn Crandall	Shannon Williams	Pamela Nicol	
2011–12	Melissa Adams	Jaclyn Crandall	Shannon Tatlock	Emily MacRae	
2012–13	Melissa Adams	Jaclyn Crandall	Brigitte McClure	Bethany Toner	Monique Massé
2013–14	Melissa Adams	Jaclyn Crandall	Abby Burgess	Shelby Wilson	Shannon Tatlock
2014–15	Shannon Tatlock	Jaclyn Crandall	Shelby Wilson	Emily MacRae	
2018–19	Sylvie Robichaud	Melissa Adams	Nicole Arsenault Bishop	Kendra Lister	Jaclyn Crandall
2019–20	Sylvie Quillian	Melissa Adams	Nicole Arsenault Bishop	Kendra Lister	Jaclyn Tingley
2020–21	Melissa Adams	Justine Comeau	Jaclyn Tingley	Kendra Lister	Nicole Arsenault Bishop
2022–23	Jaclyn Crandall	Kendra Lister	Molli Ward	Kayla Russell	Melissa Adams
2023–24	Melissa Adams	Jaclyn Crandall	Molli Ward	Kendra Lister	Kayla Russell
2024–25	Melissa Adams	Jaclyn Crandall	Kayla Russell	Kendra Lister	Molli Ward
2025–26	Melissa Adams	Jaclyn Crandall	Cayla Auld	Kendra Lister	Kayla Russell
2026–27	Mélodie Forsythe	Rebecca Watson	Carly Smith	Jenna Campbell	Jaclyn Crandall
