= Nicole Arsenault-Bishop =

Canadian curler

- Curler
- Born: Nicole Arsenault; October 28, 1981 (age 45); Moncton, New Brunswick

Team
- Curling club: Curl Moncton, Moncton, NB
- Skip: Nicole Arsenault-Bishop
- Third: Natalie Hearn
- Second: Lynn LeBlanc
- Lead: Taryn Abernethy
- Alternate: Krista Flanagan

Curling career
- Member Association: New Brunswick
- Hearts: 3 (2016, 2018, 2021)
- Top CTRS ranking: 48th (2018–19)

Nicole Arsenault-Bishop (born October 28, 1981) is a Canadian curler from Riverview, New Brunswick. She currently skips her own team out of Curl Moncton in Moncton, New Brunswick.

== Career ==
Arsenault-Bishop played in her first New Brunswick Scotties Tournament of Hearts in 2015 as second for the Melissa Adams rink. They defeated Shannon Tatlock in the semifinal before losing the final to the Sylvie Robichaud rink. The following year, she left the Adams rink and joined the Robichaud team as their alternate. They would go on to win the 2016 New Brunswick Scotties Tournament of Hearts and represent New Brunswick at the 2016 Scotties Tournament of Hearts where they finished with a 2–9 record. In 2016, she moved up to play second. They couldn't defend their provincial title, losing the tiebreaker to Sarah Mallais. The following year, Arsenault-Bishop's former teammate Melissa Adams joined the team at third. It proved to be a successful addition as the Robichaud rink won the 2018 New Brunswick Scotties Tournament of Hearts. They would have more success this time at the National Championship, finishing the new pool play format with a 4–3 record. This placed them fifth in their pool, not enough to qualify for the Championship Pool. The following season, her rink would win the 2018 Tim Hortons Spitfire Arms Cash Spiel on the World Curling Tour. They could not defend their provincial title at the 2019 New Brunswick Scotties Tournament of Hearts where they lost to the Sarah Mallais rink in the semifinal.

After failing to win the provincial championship in 2020 as well, Team Quillian disbanded. Sylvie Quillian joined the Andrea Crawford rink whereas Melissa Adams and Kendra Lister formed a new team. Due to the COVID-19 pandemic in New Brunswick, the 2021 provincial championship was cancelled. As the reigning provincial champions, Team Crawford was given the invitation to represent New Brunswick at the 2021 Scotties Tournament of Hearts, but they declined due to work and family commitments. Team Adams was then invited in their place, which they accepted. Adams' third Justine Comeau could not attend the event however due to being a student, leaving Arsenault Bishop to take her place. At the Hearts, they finished with a 3–5 round robin record, failing to qualify for the championship round.

== Personal life ==
Arsenault-Bishop is employed as the executive director and registrar of the New Brunswick Association of Dietitians.

== Teams ==
Season	Skip	Third	Second	Lead	Alternate
2014–15	Melissa Adams	Danielle Amos	Nicole Arsenault-Bishop	Kendra Lister	
2015–16	Sylvie Robichaud	Rebecca Atkinson	Marie Richard	Jane Boyle	Nicole Arsenault-Bishop
2016–17	Sylvie Robichaud	Jessica Ronalds	Nicole Arsenault-Bishop	Michelle Majeau	
2017–18	Sylvie Robichaud	Melissa Adams	Nicole Arsenault-Bishop	Kendra Lister	
2018–19	Sylvie Robichaud	Melissa Adams	Nicole Arsenault-Bishop	Kendra Lister	Jaclyn Crandall
2019–20	Sylvie Quillian	Melissa Adams	Nicole Arsenault-Bishop	Kendra Lister	Jaclyn Tingley
2020–21	Melissa Adams	Justine Comeau	Jaclyn Tingley	Kendra Lister	Nicole Arsenault-Bishop
2022–23	Shaelyn Park	Nicole Arsenault-Bishop	Krista Flanagan	Lynn LeBlanc	
2023–24	Nicole Arsenault-Bishop	Natalie Hearn	Lynn LeBlanc	Krista Flanagan	Tyler Parmiter
2024–25	Nicole Arsenault-Bishop	Natalie Hearn	Lynn LeBlanc	Taryn Abernethy	Krista Flanagan
