= 2018 Canadian Junior Curling Championships – Women's tournament =

2018 Canadian Junior Curling Championships Women's tournament
- Host city: Shawinigan, Québec
- Arena: Aréna Grand-Mère; Centre municipal de curling de Shawinigan
- Dates: January 13–21
- Winner: Nova Scotia
- Curling club: Halifax Curling Club, Halifax
- Skip: Kaitlyn Jones
- Third: Kristin Clarke
- Second: Karlee Burgess
- Lead: Lindsey Burgess
- Coach: Andrew Atherton
- Finalist: Quebec (Laurie St-Georges)

The women's tournament of the 2018 New Holland Canadian Junior Curling Championships was held from January 13 to 21 at the Aréna Grand-Mère and the Centre municipal de curling de Shawinigan.

== Teams ==
The teams are listed as follows:

Province	Skip	Third	Second	Lead	Club(s)
Alberta	Kayla Skrlik	Ashton Skrlik	Hope Sunley	Megan Johnson	Falher CC, Falher
British Columbia	Taylor Reese-Hansen	Catera Park	Jordan Koster	Sydney Brilz	Victoria CC, Victoria
Manitoba	Shae Bevan	Kyla Grabowski	Paige Beaudry	Jessica Hancox	St. Vital CC, Winnipeg
New Brunswick	Justine Comeau	Emma Le Blanc	Brigitte Comeau	Keira McLaughlin	Capital WC, Fredericton
Newfoundland and Labrador	Mackenzie Glynn	Katie Follett	Sarah Chaytor	Camille Burt	Re/Max CC, St. John's
Northwest Territories	Tyanna Bain	Mataya Gillis	Halli-Rai Delorey	Pearl Gillis	Fort Smith CC, Fort Smith
Northern Ontario	Hailey Beaudry	Kendra Lemieux	Emily Cooney	Erin Tomalty	Fort William CC, Thunder Bay
Nova Scotia	Kaitlyn Jones	Kristin Clarke	Karlee Burgess	Lindsey Burgess	Halifax CC, Halifax
Nunavut	Sadie Pinksen	Christianne West	Kaitlin MacDonald	Melicia Eliziaga	Iqaluit CC, Iqaluit
Ontario	Emma Wallingford	Grace Holyoke	Lindsay Dubue	Hannah Wallingford	Ottawa CC, Ottawa
Prince Edward Island	Lauren Lenentine	Kristie Rogers	Breanne Burgoyne	Rachel O'Connor	Cornwall CC, Cornwall
Saskatchewan	Sara England	Shelby Brandt	Stasia Wisniewski	Rayann Zerr	Callie CC, Regina
Quebec	Laurie St-Georges	Cynthia St-Georges	Emily Riley	Isabelle Thiboutot	CC Laval-sur-le-Lac, Laval; CC Baie-D'Urfé, Baie-D'Urfé
Yukon	Kelsey Meger	Emily Matthews	Peyton L'Henaff	Zaria Netro	Whitehorse CC, Whitehorse

== Round Robin Standings ==
Final Round Robin Standings

Key
Teams to Championship Pool
Teams to Tiebreakers

Pool A	Skip	W	L
Nova Scotia	Kaitlyn Jones	5	1
New Brunswick	Justine Comeau	4	2
Alberta	Kayla Skrlik	4	2
Quebec	Laurie St-Georges	4	2
Manitoba	Shae Bevan	3	3
Saskatchewan	Sara England	1	5
Yukon	Kelsey Meger	0	6

Pool B	Skip	W	L
Newfoundland and Labrador	Mackenzie Glynn	5	1
Prince Edward Island	Lauren Lenentine	5	1
Ontario	Emma Wallingford	5	1
Northern Ontario	Hailey Beaudry	3	3
British Columbia	Taylor Reese-Hansen	2	4
Nunavut	Sadie Pinksen	1	5
Northwest Territories	Tyanna Bain	0	6

== Round Robin Results ==
All draw times are listed in Eastern Standard Time (UTC−5:00).

=== Pool A ===
==== Draw 1 ====
Saturday, January 13, 09:30

Team	1	2	3	4	5	6	7	8	9	10	Final
Saskatchewan (England)	0	0	0	1	0	1	1	0	0	X	3
Quebec (St-Georges) 🔨	1	2	1	0	2	0	0	1	2	X	9

Team	1	2	3	4	5	6	7	8	9	10	Final
Yukon (Meger) 🔨	1	0	0	1	0	0	1	0	X	X	3
Manitoba (Bevan)	0	3	4	0	2	3	0	3	X	X	15

==== Draw 2 ====
Saturday, January 13, 14:00

Team	1	2	3	4	5	6	7	8	9	10	Final
Nova Scotia (Jones) 🔨	0	5	2	0	2	1	0	3	X	X	13
Yukon (Meger)	1	0	0	1	0	0	1	0	X	X	3

Team	1	2	3	4	5	6	7	8	9	10	Final
New Brunswick (Comeau) 🔨	1	2	0	0	2	1	0	1	0	X	7
Alberta (Skrlik)	0	0	0	1	0	0	1	0	2	X	4

==== Draw 3 ====
Saturday, January 13, 19:30

Team	1	2	3	4	5	6	7	8	9	10	Final
Quebec (St-Georges)	0	1	3	3	3	0	0	2	X	X	12
Nova Scotia (Jones) 🔨	0	0	0	0	0	1	1	0	X	X	2

Team	1	2	3	4	5	6	7	8	9	10	Final
Alberta (Skrlik) 🔨	1	1	0	3	0	2	0	0	0	1	8
Saskatchewan (England)	0	0	2	0	1	0	1	1	2	0	7

==== Draw 4 ====
Sunday, January 14, 09:30

Team	1	2	3	4	5	6	7	8	9	10	Final
Manitoba (Bevan)	0	0	0	0	0	3	0	2	0	2	7
New Brunswick (Comeau) 🔨	0	1	1	0	0	0	2	0	2	0	6

==== Draw 5 ====
Sunday, January 14, 14:00

Team	1	2	3	4	5	6	7	8	9	10	Final
Alberta (Skrlik) 🔨	3	0	2	0	4	1	0	3	X	X	13
Yukon (Meger)	0	1	0	1	0	0	1	0	X	X	3

Team	1	2	3	4	5	6	7	8	9	10	Final
Quebec (St-Georges) 🔨	2	1	0	2	1	0	0	1	0	0	7
Manitoba (Bevan)	0	0	1	0	0	2	1	0	1	1	6

==== Draw 6 ====
Sunday, January 14, 18:30

Team	1	2	3	4	5	6	7	8	9	10	Final
Saskatchewan (England) 🔨	0	0	0	0	1	0	0	0	1	X	2
Nova Scotia (Jones)	0	1	1	1	0	1	1	1	0	X	6

Team	1	2	3	4	5	6	7	8	9	10	Final
New Brunswick (Comeau)	0	3	2	0	0	0	2	1	1	X	9
Quebec (St-Georges) 🔨	2	0	0	2	1	0	0	0	0	X	5

==== Draw 7 ====
Monday, January 15, 09:30

Team	1	2	3	4	5	6	7	8	9	10	Final
Manitoba (Bevan) 🔨	3	0	2	0	0	1	0	0	0	1	7
Alberta (Skrlik)	0	3	0	1	1	0	1	2	1	0	9

==== Draw 8 ====
Monday, January 15, 14:00

Team	1	2	3	4	5	6	7	8	9	10	Final
Yukon (Meger)	0	0	0	2	0	1	0	0	X	X	3
Saskatchewan (England) 🔨	3	4	1	0	2	0	5	2	X	X	17

Team	1	2	3	4	5	6	7	8	9	10	Final
Nova Scotia (Jones) 🔨	0	2	0	2	0	2	0	1	3	X	10
New Brunswick (Comeau)	0	0	2	0	2	0	0	0	0	X	4

==== Draw 9 ====
Monday, January 15, 18:30

Team	1	2	3	4	5	6	7	8	9	10	Final
Alberta (Skrlik) 🔨	5	0	0	1	0	2	1	0	1	X	10
Quebec (St-Georges)	0	0	1	0	1	0	0	3	0	X	5

Team	1	2	3	4	5	6	7	8	9	10	Final
Yukon (Meger)	0	0	1	0	0	1	0	0	X	X	2
New Brunswick (Comeau) 🔨	1	3	0	0	3	0	2	3	X	X	12

==== Draw 10 ====
Tuesday, January 16, 09:30

Team	1	2	3	4	5	6	7	8	9	10	Final
New Brunswick (Comeau) 🔨	3	0	2	1	4	0	0	2	X	X	12
Saskatchewan (England)	0	1	0	0	0	1	1	0	X	X	3

Team	1	2	3	4	5	6	7	8	9	10	Final
Manitoba (Bevan)	0	0	0	2	1	0	1	0	X	X	4
Nova Scotia (Jones) 🔨	0	2	3	0	0	3	0	1	X	X	9

==== Draw 11 ====
Tuesday, January 16, 14:00

Team	1	2	3	4	5	6	7	8	9	10	Final
Saskatchewan (England)	0	1	0	0	0	0	0	1	0	X	2
Manitoba (Bevan) 🔨	0	0	2	0	1	1	1	0	1	X	6

Team	1	2	3	4	5	6	7	8	9	10	Final
Quebec (St-Georges) 🔨	0	0	2	1	0	0	0	2	0	X	5
Yukon (Meger)	0	0	0	0	2	0	0	0	0	X	2

==== Draw 12 ====
Tuesday, January 16, 18:30

Team	1	2	3	4	5	6	7	8	9	10	Final
Nova Scotia (Jones)	0	1	0	2	2	3	0	1	1	X	10
Alberta (Skrlik) 🔨	1	0	1	0	0	0	2	0	0	X	4

=== Pool B ===
==== Draw 1 ====
Saturday, January 13, 09:30

Team	1	2	3	4	5	6	7	8	9	10	Final
Northern Ontario (Beaudry) 🔨	1	0	1	0	1	0	3	0	0	X	6
Prince Edward Island (Lenentine)	0	1	0	5	0	3	0	2	2	X	13

Team	1	2	3	4	5	6	7	8	9	10	Final
Ontario (Wallingford) 🔨	0	0	2	0	0	2	1	1	1	X	7
British Columbia (Reese-Hansen)	0	0	0	1	2	0	0	0	0	X	3

==== Draw 2 ====
Saturday, January 13, 14:00

Team	1	2	3	4	5	6	7	8	9	10	Final
Newfoundland and Labrador (Glynn)	2	1	0	0	1	0	3	0	2	X	9
Northwest Territories (Bain) 🔨	0	0	1	1	0	1	0	1	0	X	4

==== Draw 3 ====
Saturday, January 13, 19:30

Team	1	2	3	4	5	6	7	8	9	10	Final
British Columbia (Reese-Hansen)	0	1	0	1	1	1	0	2	1	0	7
Northern Ontario (Beaudry) 🔨	2	0	4	0	0	0	3	0	0	1	10

Team	1	2	3	4	5	6	7	8	9	10	Final
Nunavut (Pinksen)	1	0	0	0	0	0	1	0	X	X	2
Newfoundland and Labrador (Glynn) 🔨	0	3	3	2	1	2	0	2	X	X	13

==== Draw 4 ====
Sunday, January 14, 09:30

Team	1	2	3	4	5	6	7	8	9	10	Final
Prince Edward Island (Lenentine)	0	0	2	1	1	4	2	2	X	X	12
Nunavut (Pinksen) 🔨	2	1	0	0	0	0	0	0	X	X	3

Team	1	2	3	4	5	6	7	8	9	10	Final
Northwest Territories (Bain) 🔨	0	0	0	0	0	0	0	2	X	X	2
Ontario (Wallingford)	1	5	1	3	0	1	1	0	X	X	12

==== Draw 5 ====
Sunday, January 14, 14:00

Team	1	2	3	4	5	6	7	8	9	10	Final
British Columbia (Reese-Hansen) 🔨	1	1	1	1	0	0	2	0	0	0	6
Prince Edward Island (Lenentine)	0	0	0	0	1	1	0	0	3	2	7

Team	1	2	3	4	5	6	7	8	9	10	Final
Northwest Territories (Bain)	0	0	0	1	0	0	0	1	X	X	2
Northern Ontario (Beaudry) 🔨	0	3	2	0	5	1	2	0	X	X	13

==== Draw 6 ====
Sunday, January 14, 18:30

Team	1	2	3	4	5	6	7	8	9	10	Final
Newfoundland and Labrador (Glynn) 🔨	2	0	0	1	0	0	0	1	0	X	4
Ontario (Wallingford)	0	2	0	0	3	3	1	0	1	X	10

==== Draw 7 ====
Monday, January 15, 09:30

Team	1	2	3	4	5	6	7	8	9	10	Final
Prince Edward Island (Lenentine) 🔨	0	2	0	4	3	3	1	0	X	X	13
Northwest Territories (Bain)	1	0	1	0	0	0	0	1	X	X	3

Team	1	2	3	4	5	6	7	8	9	10	Final
Nunavut (Pinksen) 🔨	0	0	0	1	0	0	1	0	X	X	2
British Columbia (Reese-Hansen)	0	3	2	0	2	0	0	2	X	X	9

==== Draw 8 ====
Monday, January 15, 14:00

Team	1	2	3	4	5	6	7	8	9	10	Final
Ontario (Wallingford) 🔨	2	0	3	1	2	2	1	0	X	X	11
Nunavut (Pinksen)	0	2	0	0	0	0	0	1	X	X	3

Team	1	2	3	4	5	6	7	8	9	10	Final
Northern Ontario (Beaudry) 🔨	1	0	1	0	0	1	0	1	0	X	4
Newfoundland and Labrador (Glynn)	0	2	0	1	2	0	2	0	4	X	11

==== Draw 9 ====
Monday, January 15, 18:30

Team	1	2	3	4	5	6	7	8	9	10	Final
Prince Edward Island (Lenentine) 🔨	0	1	1	2	0	0	2	0	3	X	9
Ontario (Wallingford)	0	0	0	0	2	1	0	1	0	X	4

==== Draw 10 ====
Tuesday, January 16, 09:30

Team	1	2	3	4	5	6	7	8	9	10	Final
Ontario (Wallingford)	0	0	4	0	0	2	0	0	1	X	7
Northern Ontario (Beaudry) 🔨	1	0	0	1	0	0	0	2	0	X	4

Team	1	2	3	4	5	6	7	8	9	10	Final
Nunavut (Pinksen) 🔨	1	3	1	1	3	1	3	0	X	X	13
Northwest Territories (Bain)	0	0	0	0	0	0	0	1	X	X	1

==== Draw 11 ====
Tuesday, January 16, 14:00

Team	1	2	3	4	5	6	7	8	9	10	Final
Northwest Territories (Bain)	0	0	1	0	0	2	2	0	0	X	5
British Columbia (Reese-Hansen) 🔨	0	0	0	5	1	0	0	4	2	X	12

Team	1	2	3	4	5	6	7	8	9	10	11	Final
Newfoundland and Labrador (Glynn) 🔨	3	0	0	1	0	0	0	1	0	1	1	7
Prince Edward Island (Lenentine)	0	1	1	0	1	1	0	0	2	0	0	6

==== Draw 12 ====
Tuesday, January 16, 18:30

Team	1	2	3	4	5	6	7	8	9	10	Final
British Columbia (Reese-Hansen)	0	0	0	0	2	1	0	1	1	0	5
Newfoundland and Labrador (Glynn) 🔨	1	0	0	1	0	0	2	0	0	2	6

Team	1	2	3	4	5	6	7	8	9	10	Final
Northern Ontario (Beaudry) 🔨	3	3	1	0	3	1	1	0	X	X	12
Nunavut (Pinksen)	0	0	0	1	0	0	0	1	X	X	2

== Placement Round ==
=== Seeding Pool ===
==== Standings ====
Final Round Robin Standings

Team	Skip	W	L
British Columbia	Taylor Reese-Hansen	5	4
Manitoba	Shae Bevan	5	4
Saskatchewan	Sara England	3	6
Nunavut	Sadie Pinksen	2	7
Northwest Territories	Tyanna Bain	1	8
Yukon	Kelsey Meger	0	9

==== Draw 13 ====
Wednesday, January 17, 14:00

Team	1	2	3	4	5	6	7	8	9	10	Final
Yukon (Meger)	0	0	2	0	0	0	0	2	1	X	5
Northwest Territories (Bain) 🔨	3	0	0	3	0	0	0	0	0	X	6

Team	1	2	3	4	5	6	7	8	9	10	Final
Saskatchewan (England) 🔨	3	0	5	0	3	1	2	0	X	X	14
Nunavut (Pinksen)	0	1	0	1	0	0	0	1	X	X	3

==== Draw 14 ====
Wednesday, January 17, 18:30

Team	1	2	3	4	5	6	7	8	9	10	Final
Yukon (Meger)	0	1	2	1	0	0	1	0	0	X	5
Nunavut (Pinksen) 🔨	1	0	0	0	2	2	0	1	2	X	8

Team	1	2	3	4	5	6	7	8	9	10	Final
Manitoba (Bevan) 🔨	2	0	3	1	1	4	2	1	X	X	14
Northwest Territories (Bain)	0	1	0	0	0	0	0	0	X	X	1

==== Draw 15 ====
Thursday, January 18, 09:30

Team	1	2	3	4	5	6	7	8	9	10	Final
Saskatchewan (England)	0	0	1	0	0	2	1	1	4	X	9
Northwest Territories (Bain) 🔨	1	0	0	0	1	0	0	0	0	X	2

==== Draw 16 ====
Thursday, January 18, 14:00

Team	1	2	3	4	5	6	7	8	9	10	Final
Manitoba (Bevan) 🔨	1	0	2	0	4	0	0	3	X	X	10
Nunavut (Pinksen)	0	0	0	1	0	0	1	0	X	X	2

Team	1	2	3	4	5	6	7	8	9	10	Final
Yukon (Meger)	0	0	0	1	0	0	0	0	X	X	1
British Columbia (Reese-Hansen) 🔨	1	2	2	0	2	2	1	0	X	X	10

==== Draw 17 ====
Thursday, January 18, 18:30

Team	1	2	3	4	5	6	7	8	9	10	Final
Saskatchewan (England) 🔨	1	0	0	0	1	0	0	1	0	X	3
British Columbia (Reese-Hansen)	0	1	0	0	0	2	1	0	2	X	6

==== Draw 19 ====
Friday, January 19, 13:00

Team	1	2	3	4	5	6	7	8	9	10	Final
Manitoba (Bevan) 🔨	1	0	1	0	0	0	1	0	1	0	4
British Columbia (Reese-Hansen)	0	1	0	0	3	0	0	2	0	1	7

=== Championship Pool ===
==== Championship Pool Standings ====
Final Round Robin Standings

Key
Teams to Playoffs
Teams to Tiebreakers

Province	Skip	W	L
Nova Scotia	Kaitlyn Jones	9	1
New Brunswick	Justine Comeau	8	2
Quebec	Laurie St-Georges	8	2
Alberta	Kayla Skrlik	7	3
Ontario	Emma Wallingford	6	4
Newfoundland and Labrador	Mackenzie Glynn	5	5
Prince Edward Island	Lauren Lenentine	5	5
Northern Ontario	Hailey Beaudry	3	7

==== Draw 13 ====
Wednesday, January 17, 14:00

Team	1	2	3	4	5	6	7	8	9	10	Final
Nova Scotia (Jones) 🔨	1	4	0	1	0	0	0	0	1	X	7
Prince Edward Island (Lenentine)	0	0	1	0	0	0	2	1	0	X	4

Team	1	2	3	4	5	6	7	8	9	10	Final
New Brunswick (Comeau) 🔨	0	0	2	0	0	0	1	2	0	X	5
Newfoundland and Labrador (Glynn)	1	0	0	1	1	0	0	0	0	X	3

==== Draw 14 ====
Wednesday, January 17, 18:30

Team	1	2	3	4	5	6	7	8	9	10	Final
Quebec (St-Georges)	0	1	0	0	2	0	1	2	1	X	7
Northern Ontario (Beaudry) 🔨	1	0	0	1	0	1	0	0	0	X	3

Team	1	2	3	4	5	6	7	8	9	10	Final
Alberta (Skrlik) 🔨	2	0	0	1	0	0	1	0	1	0	5
Ontario (Wallingford)	0	2	0	0	2	1	0	1	0	1	7

==== Draw 15 ====
Thursday, January 18, 09:30

Team	1	2	3	4	5	6	7	8	9	10	Final
Nova Scotia (Jones) 🔨	0	0	0	1	0	2	0	2	1	0	6
Ontario (Wallingford)	0	0	1	0	2	0	1	0	0	1	5

Team	1	2	3	4	5	6	7	8	9	10	Final
Quebec (St-Georges) 🔨	1	0	0	0	4	1	3	1	X	X	10
Newfoundland and Labrador (Glynn)	0	0	1	0	0	0	0	0	X	X	1

Team	1	2	3	4	5	6	7	8	9	10	Final
New Brunswick (Comeau)	0	2	0	2	0	2	0	3	0	X	9
Prince Edward Island (Lenentine) 🔨	1	0	2	0	1	0	1	0	1	X	6

==== Draw 16 ====
Thursday, January 18, 14:00

Team	1	2	3	4	5	6	7	8	9	10	Final
New Brunswick (Comeau) 🔨	2	0	2	1	0	1	1	2	X	X	9
Northern Ontario (Beaudry)	0	1	0	0	1	0	0	0	X	X	2

Team	1	2	3	4	5	6	7	8	9	10	Final
Alberta (Skrlik) 🔨	3	1	1	0	2	1	0	2	X	X	10
Newfoundland and Labrador (Glynn)	0	0	0	1	0	0	1	0	X	X	2

==== Draw 17 ====
Thursday, January 18, 18:30

Team	1	2	3	4	5	6	7	8	9	10	Final
Alberta (Skrlik) 🔨	1	0	4	0	1	0	2	1	X	X	9
Prince Edward Island (Lenentine)	0	2	0	0	0	2	0	0	X	X	4

Team	1	2	3	4	5	6	7	8	9	10	Final
Quebec (St-Georges) 🔨	0	0	2	0	0	1	0	2	1	X	6
Ontario (Wallingford)	0	0	0	1	0	0	2	0	0	X	3

Team	1	2	3	4	5	6	7	8	9	10	Final
Nova Scotia (Jones) 🔨	1	0	0	1	0	2	0	0	0	1	5
Northern Ontario (Beaudry)	0	1	1	0	1	0	0	0	0	0	3

==== Draw 18 ====
Friday, January 19, 09:00

Team	1	2	3	4	5	6	7	8	9	10	Final
Quebec (St-Georges) 🔨	1	0	0	0	0	3	0	0	3	X	7
Prince Edward Island (Lenentine)	0	0	0	0	0	0	1	0	0	X	1

Team	1	2	3	4	5	6	7	8	9	10	Final
Nova Scotia (Jones) 🔨	2	1	0	0	0	2	2	0	1	X	8
Newfoundland and Labrador (Glynn)	0	0	1	1	1	0	0	1	0	X	4

Team	1	2	3	4	5	6	7	8	9	10	Final
New Brunswick (Comeau) 🔨	0	3	0	2	0	1	0	2	0	X	8
Ontario (Wallingford)	0	0	1	0	1	0	1	0	2	X	5

Team	1	2	3	4	5	6	7	8	9	10	Final
Alberta (Skrlik) 🔨	0	3	0	1	1	0	0	0	0	1	6
Northern Ontario (Beaudry)	1	0	1	0	0	1	2	0	0	0	5

== Playoffs ==
Semifinal			Final
			1	Nova Scotia	5
2	New Brunswick	3	3	Quebec	3
3	Quebec	9

=== Semifinal ===
Saturday, January 20, 13:00

Team	1	2	3	4	5	6	7	8	9	10	Final
New Brunswick (Comeau) 🔨	1	0	0	1	0	0	0	1	X	X	3
Quebec (St-Georges)	0	2	3	0	1	2	1	0	X	X	9

Player percentages
New Brunswick		Quebec	
Keira McLaughlin	78%	Isabelle Thiboutot	79%
Brigitte Comeau	73%	Emily Riley	80%
Emma Le Blanc	80%	Cynthia St-Georges	92%
Justine Comeau	61%	Laurie St-Georges	92%
Total	73%	Total	86%

=== Final ===
Sunday, January 21, 13:00

Team	1	2	3	4	5	6	7	8	9	10	Final
Nova Scotia (Jones) 🔨	0	0	2	0	0	2	0	1	0	X	5
Quebec (St-Georges)	0	0	0	2	0	0	0	0	1	X	3

Player percentages
Nova Scotia		Quebec	
Lindsey Burgess	59%	Isabelle Thiboutot	81%
Karlee Burgess	88%	Emily Riley	73%
Kristin Clarke	85%	Cynthia St-Georges	80%
Kaitlyn Jones	89%	Laurie St-Georges	69%
Total	80%	Total	76%

2018 Canadian Junior Women's Curling Champions
(Nova Scotia)
Nova Scotia
5th Junior Women's National Championship title
