= 2016 Canadian Junior Curling Championships – Women's tournament =

2016 Canadian Junior Curling Championships Women's tournament
- Host city: Stratford, Ontario
- Arena: Stratford Rotary Complex
- Dates: January 23–31
- Winner: Nova Scotia
- Curling club: Chester Curling Club, Chester
- Skip: Mary Fay
- Third: Kristin Clarke
- Second: Karlee Burgess
- Lead: Janique LeBlanc
- Finalist: British Columbia (Sarah Daniels)

The women's tournament of the 2016 M&M Meat Shops Canadian Junior Curling Championships were held from January 23 to 31 at the Stratford Rotary Complex.

== Teams ==
The teams are listed as follows:

Province	Skip	Third	Second	Lead	Club(s)
Alberta	Selena Sturmay	Dacey Brown	Megan Moffat	Hope Sunley	Airdrie CC, Airdrie
British Columbia	Sarah Daniels	Marika Van Osch	Dezaray Hawes	Megan Daniels	Royal City CC, New Westminster
Manitoba	Abby Ackland	Robyn Njegovan	Melissa Gordon	Sara Oliver	Fort Rouge CC, Winnipeg
New Brunswick	Justine Comeau	Emma Le Blanc	Brigitte Comeau	Keira McLaughlin	Capital WC, Fredericton
Newfoundland and Labrador	Brooke Godsland	Megan Kearley	Gabrielle Molloy	Michelle Taylor	Re/Max CC, St. John's
Northwest Territories	Zoey Walsh	Julie Rowe	Kaitlyn Ring	Katherine Lenoir	Hay River CC, Hay River
Northern Ontario	Megan Smith	Kira Brunton	Kate Sherry	Emma Johnson	Sudbury CC, Sudbury
Nova Scotia	Mary Fay	Kristin Clarke	Karlee Burgess	Janique LeBlanc	Chester CC, Chester
Nunavut	Sadie Pinksen	Christianne West	Kaitlin MacDonald	Melicia Elizaga	Iqaluit CC, Iqaluit
Ontario	Courtney Auld	Thea Coburn	Jessica Humphries	Kaelyn Gregory	Bayview G&CC, Thornhill
Prince Edward Island	Katie Fullerton	Chloé McCloskey	Sabrina Smith	Aleya Quilty	Cornwall CC, Cornwall
Saskatchewan	Kourtney Fesser	Karlee Korchinski	Krista Fesser	Renelle Humphreys	Nutana CC, Saskatoon
Quebec	Laurie St-Georges	Cynthia St-Georges	Meaghan Rivett	Emily Riley	CC Laval-sur-le-Lac, Laval
Yukon	Alyssa Meger	Emily Matthews	Peyton L'Henaff	Zaria Netro	Whitehorse CC, Whitehorse

== Round-robin standings ==
Final round-robin standings

Key
Teams to Championship Pool

Pool A	Skip	W	L
New Brunswick	Justine Comeau	5	1
Manitoba	Abby Ackland	5	1
Alberta	Selena Sturmay	4	2
Quebec	Laurie St-Georges	4	2
Northern Ontario	Megan Smith	2	4
Nunavut	Sadie Pinksen	1	5
Northwest Territories	Zoey Walsh	0	6

Pool B	Skip	W	L
British Columbia	Sarah Daniels	6	0
Nova Scotia	Mary Fay	5	1
Saskatchewan	Kourtney Fesser	4	2
Ontario	Courtney Auld	3	3
Prince Edward Island	Katie Fullerton	2	4
Yukon	Alyssa Meger	1	5
Newfoundland and Labrador	Brooke Godsland	0	6

== Round-robin results ==
All draw times are listed in Eastern Standard Time (UTC−5:00).

=== Pool A ===
==== Draw 1 ====
Saturday, January 23, 13:30

Sheet D	1	2	3	4	5	6	7	8	9	10	Final
Alberta (Sturmay)	0	2	2	1	0	6	2	0	X	X	13
Nunavut (Pinksen) 🔨	1	0	0	0	1	0	0	0	X	X	2

Sheet H	1	2	3	4	5	6	7	8	9	10	Final
Quebec (St-Georges)	0	1	3	2	1	3	2	0	X	X	12
New Brunswick (Comeau) 🔨	2	0	0	0	0	0	0	1	X	X	3

==== Draw 2 ====
Saturday, January 24, 18:30

Sheet A	1	2	3	4	5	6	7	8	9	10	Final
Manitoba (Ackland) 🔨	1	0	0	1	0	2	0	3	0	1	8
Northern Ontario (Smith)	0	0	1	0	2	0	1	0	1	0	5

Sheet E	1	2	3	4	5	6	7	8	9	10	Final
New Brunswick (Comeau) 🔨	1	0	2	1	2	5	4	2	X	X	17
Northwest Territories (Walsh)	0	1	0	0	0	0	0	0	X	X	1

Sheet J	1	2	3	4	5	6	7	8	9	10	Final
Nunavut (Pinksen)	0	1	0	0	1	0	0	0	X	X	2
Quebec (St-Georges) 🔨	0	0	5	1	0	2	1	3	X	X	12

==== Draw 3 ====
Sunday, January 24, 13:30

Sheet A	1	2	3	4	5	6	7	8	9	10	Final
Quebec (St-Georges)	2	0	0	1	0	0	1	0	0	X	4
Alberta (Sturmay) 🔨	0	3	1	0	0	2	0	1	2	X	9

Sheet C	1	2	3	4	5	6	7	8	9	10	Final
Nunavut (Pinksen)	0	0	1	0	0	1	1	0	X	X	3
Northern Ontario (Smith) 🔨	1	3	0	3	1	0	0	4	X	X	12

==== Draw 4 ====
Sunday, January 24, 18:30

Sheet F	1	2	3	4	5	6	7	8	9	10	Final
Quebec (St-Georges)	1	0	1	0	0	2	0	0	1	X	5
Manitoba (Ackland) 🔨	0	2	0	1	1	0	1	3	0	X	8

Sheet G	1	2	3	4	5	6	7	8	9	10	Final
New Brunswick (Comeau)	0	0	0	1	0	3	5	5	X	X	14
Nunavut (Pinksen) 🔨	2	1	1	0	1	0	0	0	X	X	5

Sheet I	1	2	3	4	5	6	7	8	9	10	Final
Northwest Territories (Walsh)	0	1	0	0	0	0	1	X	X	X	2
Alberta (Sturmay) 🔨	3	0	1	3	3	1	0	X	X	X	11

==== Draw 5 ====
Monday, January 25, 9:00

Sheet H	1	2	3	4	5	6	7	8	9	10	Final
Alberta (Sturmay)	0	0	1	2	2	3	0	1	X	X	9
Northern Ontario (Smith) 🔨	0	1	0	0	0	0	1	0	X	X	2

==== Draw 6 ====
Monday, January 25, 13:30

Sheet F	1	2	3	4	5	6	7	8	9	10	11	Final
Alberta (Sturmay) 🔨	0	0	0	3	0	0	1	0	0	1	0	5
New Brunswick (Comeau)	0	0	0	0	2	1	0	0	2	0	1	6

Sheet H	1	2	3	4	5	6	7	8	9	10	Final
Northwest Territories (Walsh)	0	1	1	0	0	1	0	1	X	X	4
Manitoba (Ackland) 🔨	6	0	0	4	1	0	2	0	X	X	13

==== Draw 7 ====
Monday, January 25, 18:30

Sheet B	1	2	3	4	5	6	7	8	9	10	Final
Northern Ontario (Smith)	0	0	0	2	0	1	0	2	0	0	5
New Brunswick (Comeau) 🔨	0	1	0	0	3	0	1	0	2	1	8

Sheet C	1	2	3	4	5	6	7	8	9	10	Final
Northwest Territories (Walsh)	2	0	0	1	0	1	0	0	X	X	4
Quebec (St-Georges) 🔨	0	4	4	0	1	0	3	3	X	X	15

Sheet E	1	2	3	4	5	6	7	8	9	10	Final
Manitoba (Ackland) 🔨	3	4	2	0	1	0	5	0	X	X	15
Nunavut (Pinksen)	0	0	0	1	0	2	0	2	X	X	5

==== Draw 8 ====
Tuesday, January 26, 13:30

Sheet F	1	2	3	4	5	6	7	8	9	10	Final
Northern Ontario (Smith) 🔨	7	0	3	0	1	0	0	2	X	X	13
Northwest Territories (Walsh)	0	1	0	1	0	0	1	0	X	X	3

Sheet J	1	2	3	4	5	6	7	8	9	10	Final
New Brunswick (Comeau)	1	0	3	1	1	0	0	2	0	X	8
Manitoba (Ackland) 🔨	0	1	0	0	0	2	1	0	2	X	6

==== Draw 9 ====
Tuesday, January 26, 18:30

Sheet A	1	2	3	4	5	6	7	8	9	10	Final
Nunavut (Pinksen) 🔨	1	0	2	1	1	2	0	0	X	X	7
Northwest Territories (Walsh)	0	1	0	0	0	0	0	2	X	X	3

Sheet G	1	2	3	4	5	6	7	8	9	10	Final
Manitoba (Ackland)	0	1	0	0	2	0	4	0	2	X	9
Alberta (Sturmay) 🔨	2	0	0	2	0	1	0	1	0	X	6

Sheet I	1	2	3	4	5	6	7	8	9	10	Final
Northern Ontario (Smith)	0	0	3	0	1	0	1	0	X	X	5
Quebec (St-Georges) 🔨	0	3	0	2	0	2	0	4	X	X	11

=== Pool B ===
==== Draw 1 ====
Saturday, January 23, 13:30

Sheet A	1	2	3	4	5	6	7	8	9	10	Final
Ontario (Auld)	0	1	0	2	0	2	1	0	3	X	9
Newfoundland and Labrador (Godsland) 🔨	0	0	0	0	1	0	0	1	0	X	2

Sheet E	1	2	3	4	5	6	7	8	9	10	Final
Saskatchewan (Fesser)	0	4	3	0	4	0	1	0	X	X	12
Yukon (Meger) 🔨	1	0	0	1	0	1	0	1	X	X	4

Sheet I	1	2	3	4	5	6	7	8	9	10	Final
Prince Edward Island (Fullerton)	1	0	0	0	1	0	2	0	2	X	6
Nova Scotia (Fay) 🔨	0	3	1	0	0	3	0	1	0	X	8

==== Draw 2 ====
Saturday, January 23, 18:30

Sheet D	1	2	3	4	5	6	7	8	9	10	Final
British Columbia (Daniels)	0	0	0	2	1	3	0	1	X	X	7
Saskatchewan (Fesser) 🔨	1	0	0	0	0	0	1	0	X	X	2

Sheet H	1	2	3	4	5	6	7	8	9	10	Final
Newfoundland and Labrador (Godsland)	0	1	0	2	0	1	0	2	X	X	6
Nova Scotia (Fay) 🔨	2	0	3	0	5	0	2	0	X	X	12

==== Draw 3 ====
Sunday, January 24, 13:30

Sheet F	1	2	3	4	5	6	7	8	9	10	Final
Nova Scotia (Fay)	0	0	2	0	0	2	2	0	1	1	8
Ontario (Auld) 🔨	0	2	0	0	1	0	0	1	0	0	4

Sheet G	1	2	3	4	5	6	7	8	9	10	Final
Prince Edward Island (Fullerton) 🔨	0	1	0	0	3	0	1	0	0	0	5
Saskatchewan (Fesser)	0	0	1	0	0	1	0	3	0	2	7

Sheet J	1	2	3	4	5	6	7	8	9	10	Final
Yukon (Meger)	0	0	1	0	0	1	0	1	X	X	3
British Columbia (Daniels) 🔨	4	3	0	3	4	0	2	0	X	X	16

==== Draw 4 ====
Sunday, January 24, 18:30

Sheet A	1	2	3	4	5	6	7	8	9	10	Final
Saskatchewan (Fesser) 🔨	0	1	0	1	1	0	0	3	0	0	6
Nova Scotia (Fay)	0	0	3	0	0	1	1	0	0	2	7

Sheet C	1	2	3	4	5	6	7	8	9	10	Final
Newfoundland and Labrador (Godsland)	0	0	2	0	1	0	0	1	X	X	4
Prince Edward Island (Fullerton) 🔨	0	1	0	1	0	2	1	0	3	X	8

==== Draw 5 ====
Monday, January 25, 9:00

Sheet J	1	2	3	4	5	6	7	8	9	10	Final
Prince Edward Island (Fullerton)	0	0	2	0	2	0	1	0	X	X	5
Ontario (Auld) 🔨	2	1	0	3	0	4	0	3	X	X	13

==== Draw 6 ====
Monday, January 25, 13:30

Sheet B	1	2	3	4	5	6	7	8	9	10	11	Final
British Columbia (Daniels)	0	3	1	0	0	1	0	1	0	0	1	7
Prince Edward Island (Fullerton) 🔨	2	0	0	0	1	0	1	0	0	2	0	6

Sheet C	1	2	3	4	5	6	7	8	9	10	Final
Nova Scotia (Fay) 🔨	2	2	0	2	1	0	3	2	X	X	12
Yukon (Meger)	0	0	1	0	0	1	0	0	X	X	2

Sheet J	1	2	3	4	5	6	7	8	9	10	Final
Saskatchewan (Fesser) 🔨	2	0	3	0	0	1	1	0	3	X	10
Newfoundland and Labrador (Godsland)	0	1	0	3	0	0	0	1	0	X	5

==== Draw 7 ====
Monday, January 25, 18:30

Sheet G	1	2	3	4	5	6	7	8	9	10	Final
Yukon (Meger)	0	0	1	0	1	0	2	0	X	X	4
Ontario (Auld) 🔨	5	1	0	3	0	3	0	2	X	X	14

Sheet I	1	2	3	4	5	6	7	8	9	10	Final
British Columbia (Daniels) 🔨	2	2	2	4	0	1	0	2	X	X	13
Newfoundland and Labrador (Godsland)	0	0	0	0	1	0	2	0	X	X	3

==== Draw 8 ====
Tuesday, January 26, 13:30

Sheet E	1	2	3	4	5	6	7	8	9	10	Final
Newfoundland and Labrador (Godsland) 🔨	1	0	0	0	0	0	1	4	1	1	8
Yukon (Meger)	0	2	2	3	1	1	0	0	0	0	9

Sheet F	1	2	3	4	5	6	7	8	9	10	Final
Nova Scotia (Fay) 🔨	2	0	0	0	1	0	1	0	0	0	4
British Columbia (Daniels)	0	0	3	0	0	1	0	1	0	2	7

Sheet F	1	2	3	4	5	6	7	8	9	10	Final
Ontario (Auld) 🔨	1	0	0	1	1	0	0	1	1	0	5
Saskatchewan (Fesser)	0	3	1	0	0	1	1	0	0	1	7

==== Draw 9 ====
Tuesday, January 26, 18:30

Sheet C	1	2	3	4	5	6	7	8	9	10	Final
Ontario (Auld)	0	0	1	0	1	0	0	0	2	X	4
British Columbia (Daniels) 🔨	0	2	0	2	0	0	3	1	0	X	8

Sheet D	1	2	3	4	5	6	7	8	9	10	Final
Yukon (Meger)	1	0	0	2	0	2	0	0	X	X	5
Prince Edward Island (Fullerton) 🔨	0	2	2	0	1	0	3	3	X	X	11

== Placement Round ==
=== Seeding Pool ===
==== Standings ====
Final round-robin standings

Team	Skip	W	L
Northern Ontario	Megan Smith	5	4
Prince Edward Island	Katie Fullerton	4	5
Nunavut	Sadie Pinksen	2	7
Newfoundland and Labrador	Brooke Godsland	2	7
Yukon	Alyssa Meger	2	7
Northwest Territories	Zoey Walsh	0	9

===== Draw 1 =====
Wednesday, January 27, 13:30

Sheet A	1	2	3	4	5	6	7	8	9	10	Final
Yukon (Meger)	2	1	0	1	0	2	0	4	2	X	12
Northwest Territories (Walsh) 🔨	0	0	2	0	1	0	3	0	0	X	6

Sheet J	1	2	3	4	5	6	7	8	9	10	Final
Newfoundland and Labrador (Godsland)	0	1	2	0	4	0	0	3	X	X	10
Nunavut (Pinksen) 🔨	1	0	0	2	0	2	0	0	X	X	5

===== Draw 2 =====
Wednesday, January 27, 18:30

Sheet D	1	2	3	4	5	6	7	8	9	10	Final
Prince Edward Island (Fullerton) 🔨	0	1	0	2	1	1	0	1	0	1	7
Northwest Territories (Walsh)	2	0	1	0	0	0	1	0	2	0	6

Sheet G	1	2	3	4	5	6	7	8	9	10	Final
Newfoundland and Labrador (Godsland)	0	1	0	0	1	2	0	1	1	0	6
Northern Ontario (Smith) 🔨	0	0	3	1	0	0	1	0	0	2	7

===== Draw 3 =====
Thursday, January 28, 13:30

Sheet B	1	2	3	4	5	6	7	8	9	10	Final
Nunavut (Pinksen)	0	1	0	2	0	0	1	0	1	0	5
Prince Edward Island (Fullerton) 🔨	0	0	0	0	2	1	0	0	0	3	6

Sheet C	1	2	3	4	5	6	7	8	9	10	Final
Northern Ontario (Smith)	0	6	0	2	0	0	5	0	X	X	13
Yukon (Meger) 🔨	2	0	1	0	1	1	0	1	X	X	6

Sheet F	1	2	3	4	5	6	7	8	9	10	Final
Northwest Territories (Walsh)	0	1	0	1	0	0	0	0	X	X	2
Newfoundland and Labrador (Godsland) 🔨	3	0	3	0	2	0	0	4	X	X	12

===== Draw 4 =====
Thursday, January 28, 18:30

Sheet H	1	2	3	4	5	6	7	8	9	10	Final
Nunavut (Pinksen) 🔨	3	2	2	2	1	0	1	0	X	X	11
Yukon (Meger)	0	0	0	0	0	1	0	2	X	X	3

===== Draw 5 =====
Friday, January 29, 9:00

Sheet F	1	2	3	4	5	6	7	8	9	10	Final
Northern Ontario (Smith) 🔨	1	1	0	0	0	1	0	5	X	X	8
Prince Edward Island (Fullerton)	0	0	0	1	1	0	1	0	X	X	3

=== Championship Pool ===
==== Championship Pool Standings ====
Final round-robin standings

Key
Teams to Playoffs
Teams to Tiebreaker

Province	Skip	W	L
Nova Scotia	Mary Fay	9	1
British Columbia	Sarah Daniels	8	2
New Brunswick	Justine Comeau	7	3
Manitoba	Abby Ackland	7	3
Alberta	Selena Sturmay	6	4
Quebec	Laurie St-Georges	6	4
Ontario	Courtney Auld	5	5
Saskatchewan	Kourtney Fesser	4	6

===== Draw 1 =====
Wednesday, January 27, 13:30

Sheet C	1	2	3	4	5	6	7	8	9	10	11	Final
British Columbia (Daniels) 🔨	1	0	2	0	0	3	0	1	0	0	1	8
Alberta (Sturmay)	0	2	0	1	0	0	2	0	0	2	0	7

Sheet E	1	2	3	4	5	6	7	8	9	10	11	Final
Saskatchewan (Fesser)	0	1	0	0	1	3	0	1	0	1	0	7
New Brunswick (Comeau) 🔨	1	0	1	1	0	0	2	0	2	0	1	8

Sheet H	1	2	3	4	5	6	7	8	9	10	Final
Nova Scotia (Fay) 🔨	1	0	2	1	0	0	0	0	4	X	8
Quebec (St-Georges)	0	2	0	0	0	1	0	0	0	X	3

===== Draw 2 =====
Wednesday, January 27, 18:30

Sheet C	1	2	3	4	5	6	7	8	9	10	Final
Ontario (Auld)	0	2	0	0	1	1	1	1	0	0	6
Manitoba (Ackland) 🔨	1	0	2	3	0	0	0	0	1	1	8

Sheet I	1	2	3	4	5	6	7	8	9	10	Final
Nova Scotia (Fay)	1	1	2	0	3	1	0	1	X	X	9
Alberta (Sturmay) 🔨	0	0	0	1	0	0	2	0	X	X	3

Sheet J	1	2	3	4	5	6	7	8	9	10	Final
British Columbia (Daniels)	1	0	2	0	1	0	0	0	0	0	4
Quebec (St-Georges) 🔨	0	2	0	1	0	0	1	1	0	2	7

===== Draw 3 =====
Thursday, January 28, 13:30

Sheet H	1	2	3	4	5	6	7	8	9	10	Final
Ontario (Auld)	0	2	1	0	1	0	2	0	4	X	10
New Brunswick (Comeau) 🔨	1	0	0	1	0	1	0	1	0	X	4

Sheet J	1	2	3	4	5	6	7	8	9	10	Final
Saskatchewan (Fesser) 🔨	0	0	0	1	1	0	0	1	1	1	5
Manitoba (Ackland)	0	2	1	0	0	2	1	0	0	0	6

===== Draw 4 =====
Thursday, January 28, 18:30

Sheet B	1	2	3	4	5	6	7	8	9	10	Final
Quebec (St-Georges)	0	2	0	2	0	1	0	1	1	1	8
Saskatchewan (Fesser) 🔨	1	0	1	0	1	0	2	0	0	0	5

Sheet D	1	2	3	4	5	6	7	8	9	10	Final
Alberta (Sturmay) 🔨	1	0	1	1	2	0	3	1	X	X	9
Ontario (Auld)	0	0	0	0	0	2	0	0	X	X	2

Sheet G	1	2	3	4	5	6	7	8	9	10	11	Final
Manitoba (Ackland) 🔨	0	0	1	0	1	0	0	1	0	2	0	5
British Columbia (Daniels)	0	1	0	1	0	2	0	0	1	0	3	8

Sheet J	1	2	3	4	5	6	7	8	9	10	Final
New Brunswick (Comeau) 🔨	0	0	1	0	2	1	0	0	0	X	4
Nova Scotia (Fay)	1	0	0	2	0	0	4	1	3	X	11

===== Draw 5 =====
Friday, January 29, 9:00

Sheet A	1	2	3	4	5	6	7	8	9	10	Final
Alberta (Sturmay) 🔨	0	2	0	0	2	0	5	0	X	X	9
Saskatchewan (Fesser)	0	0	1	0	0	1	0	3	X	X	5

Sheet B	1	2	3	4	5	6	7	8	9	10	Final
Manitoba (Ackland)	0	0	0	0	0	3	0	1	2	0	6
Nova Scotia (Fay) 🔨	1	0	1	1	1	0	2	0	0	2	8

Sheet D	1	2	3	4	5	6	7	8	9	10	Final
New Brunswick (Comeau)	0	1	0	1	0	0	0	0	3	X	5
British Columbia (Daniels) 🔨	1	0	0	0	1	0	0	0	0	X	2

Sheet I	1	2	3	4	5	6	7	8	9	10	Final
Quebec (St-Georges)	0	2	0	1	0	0	0	1	0	X	4
Ontario (Auld) 🔨	2	0	0	0	3	0	2	0	2	X	9

===== Tiebreaker =====
Friday, January 29, 14:00

Team	1	2	3	4	5	6	7	8	9	10	Final
New Brunswick (Comeau) 🔨	0	2	0	2	0	0	0	1	0	2	7
Manitoba (Ackland)	1	0	1	0	1	0	1	0	1	0	5

== Playoffs ==
Semifinal			Final
			1	Nova Scotia	9
2	British Columbia	7	2	British Columbia	5
3	New Brunswick	3

=== Semifinal ===
Saturday, January 30, 14:00

Team	1	2	3	4	5	6	7	8	9	10	Final
British Columbia (Daniels) 🔨	0	0	2	2	0	0	2	0	1	X	7
New Brunswick (Comeau)	0	1	0	0	0	1	0	1	0	X	3

Player percentages
British Columbia		New Brunswick	
Megan Daniels	71%	Keira McLaughlin	84%
Dezaray Hawes	100%	Brigitte Comeau	75%
Marika Van Osch	88%	Emma Le Blanc	78%
Sarah Daniels	86%	Justine Comeau	71%
Total	87%	Total	77%

=== Final ===
Sunday, January 31, 10:00

Team	1	2	3	4	5	6	7	8	9	10	Final
Nova Scotia (Fay) 🔨	1	0	2	2	0	0	0	2	2	X	9
British Columbia (Daniels)	0	2	0	0	1	1	1	0	0	X	5

Player percentages
Nova Scotia		British Columbia	
Janique LeBlanc	72%	Megan Daniels	84%
Karlee Burgess	80%	Dezaray Hawes	76%
Kristin Clarke	70%	Marika Van Osch	76%
Mary Fay	80%	Sarah Daniels	60%
Total	75%	Total	74%

2016 Canadian Junior Women's Curling Champions
(Nova Scotia)
Nova Scotia
4th Junior Women's National Championship title
