= 2017 Canadian U18 Curling Championships =

- Host city: Moncton, New Brunswick
- Arena: Superior Propane Centre & Curl Moncton
- Dates: April 18–22
- Men's winner: Northern Ontario
- Curling club: Sudbury Curling Club, Sudbury
- Skip: Jacob Horgan
- Third: Max Cull
- Second: Nick Bissonnette
- Lead: Shane Robinson
- Coach: Gerry Horgan
- Finalist: Nova Scotia (Ryan Abraham)
- Women's winner: Northern Ontario
- Curling club: Sudbury Curling Club, Sudbury
- Skip: Kira Brunton
- Third: Kate Sherry
- Second: Sydnie Stinson
- Lead: Jessica Leonard
- Coach: Steve Acorn
- Finalist: New Brunswick (Justine Comeau)

The 2017 Canadian U18 Curling Championships were held from April 18 to 22 at the Superior Propane Centre and Curl Moncton in Moncton, New Brunswick.

== Men ==
=== Round-robin standings ===
Final round-robin standings

Key
Teams to Championship Pool

Pool A	Skip	W	L
Saskatchewan	Rylan Kleiter	4	1
Nova Scotia	Ryan Abraham	3	2
Northern Ontario	Jacob Horgan	3	2
Newfoundland and Labrador	Andrew Lawrence	2	3
Manitoba	Brett Walter	2	3
Prince Edward Island	Donald DeWolfe	1	4

Pool B	Skip	W	L
British Columbia	Tyler Tardi	5	0
Ontario	Hazen Enman	3	2
Quebec	Greg Cheal	3	2
New Brunswick	Liam Marin	3	2
Alberta	Riley Helston	1	4
Northwest Territories	Oberon Lee	0	5

=== Championship Pool Standings ===
Final Championship Pool Standings

Key
Teams to Playoffs

Province	Skip	W	L
British Columbia	Tyler Tardi	7	1
Saskatchewan	Rylan Kleiter	6	2
Nova Scotia	Ryan Abraham	5	3
Northern Ontario	Jacob Horgan	5	3
Ontario	Hazen Enman	4	4
Quebec	Gregory Cheal	3	5

=== Playoffs ===
Semifinals
1	British Columbia	1
4	Northern Ontario	5
2	Saskatchewan	3
3	Nova Scotia	5

Final
4	Northern Ontario	4
3	Nova Scotia	1

Bronze medal game
1	British Columbia	6
2	Saskatchewan	4

==== Semifinals ====
Sunday, April 22, 1:00 pm

Sheet C	1	2	3	4	5	6	7	8	Final
Saskatchewan (Kleiter)	0	0	1	0	2	0	0	0	3
Nova Scotia (Abraham)	0	1	0	3	0	0	0	1	5

Player percentages
Saskatchewan		Nova Scotia	
Matthieu Taillon	69%	Thomas Mosher	78%
Joshua Mattern	73%	Jake Flemming	75%
Trevor Johnson	83%	Mitchell Cortello	80%
Rylan Kleiter	68%	Ryan Abraham	83%
Total	73%	Total	79%

Sheet D	1	2	3	4	5	6	7	8	Final
British Columbia (Tardi)	0	0	0	0	0	1	0	X	1
Northern Ontario (Horgan)	1	0	1	1	0	0	2	X	5

Player percentages
British Columbia		Northern Ontario	
Scott Gray	86%	Shane Robinson	84%
Derek Chandler	91%	Nicholas Bissonnette	96%
Sterling Middleton	77%	Max Cull	88%
Tyler Tardi	77%	Jacob Horgan	96%
Total	83%	Total	91%

==== Bronze medal game ====
Sunday, April 22, 5:15 pm

Sheet A	1	2	3	4	5	6	7	8	Final
British Columbia (Tardi)	0	0	0	2	0	2	0	2	6
Saskatchewan (Kleiter)	0	1	1	0	2	0	0	0	4

Player percentages
British Columbia		Saskatchewan	
Scott Gray	77%	Matthieu Taillon	83%
Derek Chandler	70%	Joshua Mattern	81%
Sterling Middleton	55%	Trevor Johnson	84%
Tyler Tardi	86%	Rylan Kleiter	64%
Total	72%	Total	78%

==== Final ====
Sunday, April 22, 5:15 pm

Sheet B	1	2	3	4	5	6	7	8	Final
Northern Ontario (Horgan)	0	0	2	1	0	0	1	X	4
Nova Scotia (Abraham)	0	1	0	0	0	0	0	X	1

Player percentages
Northern Ontario		Nova Scotia	
Shane Robinson	90%	Thomas Mosher	94%
Nicholas Bissonnette	63%	Jake Flemming	59%
Max Cull	72%	Mitchell Cortello	84%
Jacob Horgan	98%	Ryan Abraham	73%
Total	81%	Total	78%

== Women ==
=== Round-robin standings ===
Final round-robin standings

Key
Teams to Championship Pool

Pool A	Skip	W	L
Northern Ontario	Kira Brunton	4	1
Alberta	Abby Marks	4	1
Manitoba	Mackenzie Zacharias	3	2
Ontario	Kayla Gray	2	3
Saskatchewan	Rachel Erickson	1	4
Newfoundland and Labrador	Mackenzie Glynn	1	4

Pool B	Skip	W	L
New Brunswick	Justine Comeau	5	0
Nova Scotia	Cally Moore	4	1
Quebec	Gabrielle Lavoie	2	3
Prince Edward Island	Lauren Lenentine	2	3
British Columbia	Heather Drexel	2	3
Northwest Territories	Tyanna Bain	0	5

=== Championship Pool Standings ===
Final Championship Pool Standings

Key
Teams to Playoffs

Province	Skip	W	L
New Brunswick	Justine Comeau	7	1
Northern Ontario	Kira Brunton	5	3
Nova Scotia	Cally Moore	5	3
Quebec	Gabrielle Lavoie	5	3
Alberta	Abby Marks	5	3
Manitoba	Mackenzie Zacharias	4	4

=== Playoffs ===
Semifinals
1	New Brunswick	6
4	Quebec	5
2	Northern Ontario	6
3	Nova Scotia	1

Final
1	New Brunswick	4
2	Northern Ontario	8

Bronze medal game
4	Quebec	7
3	Nova Scotia	6

==== Semifinals ====
Sunday, April 22, 1:00 pm

Sheet A	1	2	3	4	5	6	7	8	Final
Northern Ontario (Brunton)	0	1	0	1	0	2	1	1	6
Nova Scotia (Moore)	0	0	0	0	1	0	0	0	1

Player percentages
Northern Ontario		Nova Scotia	
Jessica Leonard	87%	Cate Fitzgerald	61%
Sydnie Stinson	61%	Alexis Chiasson	48%
Kate Sherry	69%	Cassidy Currie	69%
Kira Brunton	87%	Cally Moore	62%
Total	75%	Total	60%

Sheet B	1	2	3	4	5	6	7	8	9	Final
New Brunswick (Comeau)	1	0	0	1	0	1	2	0	1	6
Quebec (Lavoie)	0	0	2	0	1	0	0	2	0	5

Player percentages
New Brunswick		Quebec	
Keira McLaughlin	88%	Julie Daigle	92%
Brigitte Comeau	66%	Anna Munroe	53%
Emma Le Blanc	61%	Patricia Boudreault	64%
Justine Comeau	88%	Gabrielle Lavoie	80%
Total	75%	Total	72%

==== Bronze medal game ====
Sunday, April 22, 5:15 pm

Sheet C	1	2	3	4	5	6	7	8	Final
Quebec (Lavoie)	1	0	0	0	0	3	3	0	7
Nova Scotia (Moore)	0	0	0	1	4	0	0	1	6

Player percentages
Quebec		Nova Scotia	
Julie Daigle	86%	Cate Fitzgerald	72%
Anna Munroe	88%	Alexis Chiasson	70%
Patricia Boudreault	59%	Cassidy Currie	55%
Gabrielle Lavoie	53%	Cally Moore	48%
Total	71%	Total	62%

==== Final ====
Sunday, April 22, 5:15 pm

Sheet D	1	2	3	4	5	6	7	8	Final
New Brunswick (Comeau)	1	0	0	1	0	2	0	X	4
Northern Ontario (Brunton)	0	4	1	0	1	0	2	X	8

Player percentages
New Brunswick		Northern Ontario	
Keira McLaughlin	83%	Jessica Leonard	46%
Brigitte Comeau	72%	Sydnie Stinson	56%
Emma Le Blanc	41%	Kate Sherry	70%
Justine Comeau	71%	Kira Brunton	77%
Total	67%	Total	63%
