= 2018 New Brunswick Scotties Tournament of Hearts =

- Host city: Moncton, New Brunswick
- Arena: Curl Moncton
- Dates: January 4–7
- Winner: Team Robichaud
- Curling club: Curl Moncton
- Skip: Sylvie Robichaud
- Third: Melissa Adams
- Second: Nicole Arsenault Bishop
- Lead: Kendra Lister
- Finalist: Sarah Mallais

The 2018 New Brunswick Scotties Tournament of Hearts, the provincial women's curling championship of New Brunswick was held January 4 to 7 at Curl Moncton in Moncton. The winning team, the Sylvie Robichaud rink from Moncton represented New Brunswick at the 2018 Scotties Tournament of Hearts in Penticton, British Columbia.

== Teams ==
The teams are listed as follows:

Skip	Third	Second	Lead	Club(s)
Jennifer Armstrong	Jillian Keough	Jamie Ward	Katie Forward	Riverside Country Club, Rothesay
Justine Comeau	Emma Le Blanc	Brigitte Comeau	Keira McLaughlin	Capital Winter Club, Fredericton
Samantha Crook	Julia Hunter	Molli Ward	Kayla Russell	Sackville Curling Club, Sackville
Sarah Mallais	Carol Whitaker	Leah Thompson	Jane Boyle	Thistle-St. Andrew's Curling Club, Saint John
Sylvie Robichaud	Melissa Adams	Nicole Arsenault Bishop	Kendra Lister	Curl Moncton, Moncton
Shannon Tatlock	Sandy Comeau	Shelley Thomas	Lynn LeBlanc	Curl Moncton, Moncton

== Round-robin standings ==
Key
Teams to Playoffs
Teams to Tiebreaker

Skip	W	L
Sylvie Robichaud	4	1
Jennifer Armstrong	3	2
Sarah Mallais	3	2
Justine Comeau	3	2
Samantha Crook	2	3
Shannon Tatlock	0	5

== Round-robin results ==
All draw times are listed in Atlantic Time (UTC−03:00).

=== Draw 1 ===
Thursday, January 4, 1:00 pm

Sheet 7	1	2	3	4	5	6	7	8	9	10	Final
Sylvie Robichaud	1	0	0	3	0	2	0	2	2	X	10
Shannon Tatlock	0	0	1	0	2	0	0	0	0	X	3

Sheet 8	1	2	3	4	5	6	7	8	9	10	Final
Jennifer Armstrong	0	1	0	0	0	1	3	0	2	X	7
Sarah Mallais	1	0	0	0	2	0	0	1	0	X	4

Sheet 9	1	2	3	4	5	6	7	8	9	10	11	Final
Justine Comeau	0	2	1	0	1	0	1	1	1	0	2	9
Samantha Crook	0	0	0	3	0	1	0	0	0	3	0	7

=== Draw 2 ===
Friday, January 5, 1:00 pm

Sheet 7	1	2	3	4	5	6	7	8	9	10	11	Final
Jennifer Armstrong	0	1	0	1	0	1	2	0	0	1	0	6
Samantha Crook	1	0	1	0	1	0	0	3	0	0	1	7

Sheet 8	1	2	3	4	5	6	7	8	9	10	Final
Justine Comeau	1	0	0	1	2	0	0	1	1	0	6
Shannon Tatlock	0	2	1	0	0	0	1	0	0	1	5

Sheet 9	1	2	3	4	5	6	7	8	9	10	Final
Sarah Mallais	1	1	0	1	0	1	0	1	0	2	7
Sylvie Robichaud	0	0	2	0	2	0	1	0	1	0	6

=== Draw 3 ===
Friday, January 5, 7:00 pm

Sheet 7	1	2	3	4	5	6	7	8	9	10	Final
Shannon Tatlock	0	0	0	0	0	1	X	X	X	X	1
Sarah Mallais	1	1	0	2	4	0	X	X	X	X	8

Sheet 8	1	2	3	4	5	6	7	8	9	10	Final
Sylvie Robichaud	2	0	3	0	0	2	X	X	X	X	7
Samantha Crook	0	1	0	1	1	0	X	X	X	X	3

Sheet 9	1	2	3	4	5	6	7	8	9	10	Final
Jennifer Armstrong	0	1	0	1	1	0	0	1	1	1	6
Justine Comeau	2	0	1	0	0	0	2	0	0	0	5

=== Draw 4 ===
Saturday, January 6, 9:00 am

Sheet 7	1	2	3	4	5	6	7	8	9	10	Final
Justine Comeau	0	2	0	1	0	1	0	1	2	0	7
Sylvie Robichaud	1	0	4	0	1	0	1	0	0	1	8

Sheet 8	1	2	3	4	5	6	7	8	9	10	Final
Shannon Tatlock	1	0	0	0	2	0	0	X	X	X	3
Jennifer Armstrong	0	3	1	2	0	0	2	X	X	X	8

Sheet 9	1	2	3	4	5	6	7	8	9	10	11	Final
Samantha Crook	1	0	1	0	1	0	0	1	0	1	0	5
Sarah Mallais	0	1	0	2	0	1	1	0	0	0	2	7

=== Draw 5 ===
Saturday, January 6, 2:30 pm

Sheet 7	1	2	3	4	5	6	7	8	9	10	Final
Samantha Crook	3	1	1	0	3	3	X	X	X	X	11
Shannon Tatlock	0	0	0	2	0	0	X	X	X	X	2

Sheet 8	1	2	3	4	5	6	7	8	9	10	Final
Sarah Mallais	0	1	0	0	0	0	1	0	0	0	2
Justine Comeau	1	0	0	0	2	0	0	0	0	2	5

Sheet 9	1	2	3	4	5	6	7	8	9	10	Final
Sylvie Robichaud	0	2	0	0	1	0	0	2	0	2	7
Jennifer Armstrong	1	0	0	2	0	2	0	0	1	0	6

== Tiebreaker ==
Saturday, January 6, 7:00 pm

Sheet 9	1	2	3	4	5	6	7	8	9	10	Final
Justine Comeau	0	2	0	0	0	1	0	X	X	X	3
Sarah Mallais	0	0	2	0	1	0	5	X	X	X	8

== Playoffs ==
Semifinal			Final
			1	Sylvie Robichaud	7
2	Jennifer Armstrong	5	3	Sarah Mallais	5
3	Sarah Mallais	6

=== Semifinal ===
Sunday, January 7, 9:00 am

Sheet 9	1	2	3	4	5	6	7	8	9	10	11	Final
Jennifer Armstrong	0	0	0	2	0	1	1	0	0	1	0	5
Sarah Mallais	0	0	1	0	2	0	0	1	1	0	1	6

=== Final ===
Sunday, January 7, 2:00 pm

Sheet 9	1	2	3	4	5	6	7	8	9	10	Final
Sylvie Robichaud	0	0	1	0	0	2	0	2	1	1	7
Sarah Mallais	1	0	0	2	1	0	1	0	0	0	5

2018 New Brunswick Scotties Tournament of Hearts

Sylvie Robichaud
4th New Brunswick Provincial Championship title
