= 2017 Canadian U18 Curling Championships – Women's tournament =

2017 Canadian U18 Curling Championships Women's tournament
- Host city: Moncton, New Brunswick
- Arena: Superior Propane Centre & Curl Moncton
- Dates: April 18–22
- Winner: Northern Ontario
- Curling club: Sudbury Curling Club, Sudbury
- Skip: Kira Brunton
- Third: Kate Sherry
- Second: Sydnie Stinson
- Lead: Jessica Leonard
- Coach: Steve Acorn
- Finalist: New Brunswick (Comeau)

The women's tournament of the 2017 Canadian U18 Curling Championships was held from April 18 to 22 at the Superior Propane Centre and Curl Moncton in Moncton, New Brunswick.

== Teams ==
The teams are listed as follows:

Province	Skip	Third	Second	Lead	Club(s)
Alberta	Abby Marks	Paige Papley	Jamie Scott	Brittany Brezinski	Saville Community Sports Centre, Edmonton
British Columbia	Heather Drexel	Everlea Royea	Washington Reimer	Madeline Britz	Langley Curling Centre, Langley & Coquitlam Curling Club, Coquitlam & Chilliwack Curling Club, Chilliwack & Cloverdale Curling Club, Cloverdale
Manitoba	Mackenzie Zacharias	Morgan Reimer	Emily Zacharias	Paige Beaudry	Altona Curling Club, Altona
New Brunswick	Justine Comeau	Emma Le Blanc	Brigitte Comeau	Keira McLaughlin	Capital Winter Club, Fredericton
Newfoundland and Labrador	Mackenzie Glynn	Katie Follett	Sarah Chaytor	Camille Burt	St. John's Curling Club, St. John's
Northern Ontario	Kira Brunton	Kate Sherry	Sydnie Stinson	Jessica Leonard	Sudbury Curling Club, Sudbury
Northwest Territories	Tyanna Bain	Andréane Gagnon	Mataya Gillis	Paris Wainman	Inuvik Curling Club, Inuvik
Nova Scotia	Cally Moore	Cassidy Currie	Alexis Chiasson	Cate Fitzgerald	CFB Halifax Curling Club, Halifax
Ontario	Kayla Gray	Mikayla Gemmill	Chelsea Ferrier	Morgan Typhair	Stirling Curling Club, Stirling
Prince Edward Island	Lauren Lenentine	Kristie Rogers	Tati Kelly	Rachel O'Connor	Cornwall Curling Club, Cornwall
Quebec	Gabrielle Lavoie	Patricia Boudreault	Anna Munroe	Julie Daigle	Club de Curling Victoria, Quebec & Club de Curling Etchemin, Lévis
Saskatchewan	Rachel Erickson	Sarah Hoag	Rachel Ryan	Kelly Kay	Maryfield Curling Club, Maryfield

== Round-robin standings ==
Final round-robin standings

Key
Teams to Championship Pool

Pool A	Skip	W	L
Northern Ontario	Kira Brunton	4	1
Alberta	Abby Marks	4	1
Manitoba	Mackenzie Zacharias	3	2
Ontario	Kayla Gray	2	3
Saskatchewan	Rachel Erickson	1	4
Newfoundland and Labrador	Mackenzie Glynn	1	4

Pool B	Skip	W	L
New Brunswick	Justine Comeau	5	0
Nova Scotia	Cally Moore	4	1
Quebec	Gabrielle Lavoie	2	3
Prince Edward Island	Lauren Lenentine	2	3
British Columbia	Heather Drexel	2	3
Northwest Territories	Tyanna Bain	0	5

== Round-robin results ==
All draw times are listed in Atlantic Time (UTC−04:00).

=== Pool A ===
==== Draw 1 ====
Wednesday, April 18, 11:00 am

Sheet B	1	2	3	4	5	6	7	8	Final
Northern Ontario (Brunton) 🔨	1	1	0	2	0	0	0	3	7
Alberta (Marks)	0	0	3	0	0	1	0	0	4

Sheet D	1	2	3	4	5	6	7	8	9	Final
Newfoundland and Labrador (Glynn) 🔨	1	0	1	0	3	0	0	1	0	6
Manitoba (Zacharias)	0	1	0	3	0	1	1	0	1	7

Sheet F	1	2	3	4	5	6	7	8	Final
Ontario (Gray) 🔨	0	0	1	0	0	2	1	1	5
Saskatchewan (Erickson)	0	0	0	0	1	0	0	0	1

==== Draw 2 ====
Wednesday, April 18, 3:00 pm

Sheet G	1	2	3	4	5	6	7	8	Final
Saskatchewan (Erickson) 🔨	0	1	0	0	2	0	0	X	3
Northern Ontario (Brunton)	1	0	3	0	0	1	1	X	6

Sheet H	1	2	3	4	5	6	7	8	Final
Newfoundland and Labrador (Glynn) 🔨	1	0	0	1	0	1	0	0	3
Alberta (Marks)	0	0	1	0	1	0	2	1	5

==== Draw 3 ====
Wednesday, April 18, 7:00 pm

Sheet C	1	2	3	4	5	6	7	8	Final
Ontario (Gray)	0	1	0	0	2	0	0	0	3
Manitoba (Zacharias) 🔨	1	0	0	3	0	0	0	1	5

==== Draw 4 ====
Thursday, April 19, 10:00 am

Sheet A	1	2	3	4	5	6	7	8	9	Final
Ontario (Gray) 🔨	1	0	1	0	1	3	0	0	1	7
Northern Ontario (Brunton)	0	2	0	2	0	0	1	1	0	6

Sheet D	1	2	3	4	5	6	7	8	Final
Newfoundland and Labrador (Glynn)	0	0	0	0	0	1	1	X	2
Saskatchewan (Erickson) 🔨	0	0	0	3	3	0	0	X	6

==== Draw 5 ====
Thursday, April 19, 2:00 pm

Sheet A	1	2	3	4	5	6	7	8	Final
Manitoba (Zacharias) 🔨	1	2	0	0	0	0	0	X	3
Northern Ontario (Brunton)	0	0	2	1	1	0	2	X	6

Sheet D	1	2	3	4	5	6	7	8	Final
Alberta (Marks) 🔨	0	2	1	0	1	0	2	X	6
Saskatchewan (Erickson)	0	0	0	1	0	0	0	X	1

Sheet I	1	2	3	4	5	6	7	8	Final
Newfoundland and Labrador (Glynn)	0	0	2	0	2	1	0	1	6
Ontario (Gray) 🔨	0	1	0	2	0	0	1	0	4

==== Draw 6 ====
Thursday, April 19, 6:00 pm

Sheet F	1	2	3	4	5	6	7	8	Final
Alberta (Marks) 🔨	1	0	2	1	0	2	0	1	7
Manitoba (Zacharias)	0	2	0	0	1	0	2	0	5

==== Draw 7 ====
Friday, April 20, 10:00 am

Sheet A	1	2	3	4	5	6	7	8	Final
Alberta (Marks) 🔨	1	0	0	2	0	2	1	X	6
Ontario (Gray)	0	0	1	0	1	0	0	X	2

Sheet B	1	2	3	4	5	6	7	8	9	Final
Manitoba (Zacharias)	0	1	0	3	0	2	0	0	2	8
Saskatchewan (Erickson) 🔨	2	0	1	0	1	0	1	1	0	6

==== Draw 8 ====
Friday, April 20, 2:00 pm

Sheet C	1	2	3	4	5	6	7	8	Final
Northern Ontario (Brunton)	1	1	2	0	3	4	X	X	11
Newfoundland and Labrador (Glynn) 🔨	0	0	0	3	0	0	X	X	3

=== Pool B ===
==== Draw 2 ====
Wednesday, April 18, 3:00 pm

Sheet A	1	2	3	4	5	6	7	8	Final
Prince Edward Island (Lenentine)	0	0	1	1	0	0	1	0	3
British Columbia (Drexel) 🔨	2	1	0	0	1	1	0	1	6

Sheet D	1	2	3	4	5	6	7	8	Final
Quebec (Lavoie)	1	0	0	1	2	0	0	0	4
Nova Scotia (Moore) 🔨	0	0	1	0	0	1	1	2	5

Sheet E	1	2	3	4	5	6	7	8	Final
Northwest Territories (Bain)	0	0	0	0	0	1	X	X	1
New Brunswick (Comeau) 🔨	3	2	2	1	4	0	X	X	12

==== Draw 3 ====
Wednesday, April 18, 7:00 pm

Sheet B	1	2	3	4	5	6	7	8	Final
Northwest Territories (Bain) 🔨	1	0	0	1	0	0	1	X	3
British Columbia (Drexel)	0	2	4	0	2	0	0	X	8

Sheet H	1	2	3	4	5	6	7	8	Final
Quebec (Lavoie) 🔨	2	0	0	1	0	0	0	0	3
Prince Edward Island (Lenentine)	0	2	1	0	0	1	0	1	5

Sheet I	1	2	3	4	5	6	7	8	Final
Nova Scotia (Moore)	0	0	0	1	0	0	0	X	1
New Brunswick (Comeau) 🔨	0	0	1	0	0	2	0	X	3

==== Draw 5 ====
Thursday, April 19, 2:00 pm

Sheet C	1	2	3	4	5	6	7	8	Final
Northwest Territories (Bain)	0	1	0	0	0	1	0	X	2
Nova Scotia (Moore) 🔨	4	0	1	1	2	0	2	X	10

Sheet E	1	2	3	4	5	6	7	8	Final
British Columbia (Drexel) 🔨	2	0	0	0	1	0	0	X	3
Quebec (Lavoie)	0	1	1	2	0	0	2	X	6

==== Draw 6 ====
Thursday, April 19, 6:00 pm

Sheet A	1	2	3	4	5	6	7	8	Final
Quebec (Lavoie)	0	3	0	4	0	3	X	X	10
Northwest Territories (Bain) 🔨	1	0	1	0	1	0	X	X	3

Sheet D	1	2	3	4	5	6	7	8	Final
British Columbia (Drexel)	0	0	0	1	0	0	0	X	1
New Brunswick (Comeau) 🔨	0	2	1	0	0	1	3	X	7

Sheet E	1	2	3	4	5	6	7	8	Final
Nova Scotia (Moore)	0	3	0	0	2	1	0	X	6
Prince Edward Island (Lenentine) 🔨	2	0	0	1	0	0	1	X	4

==== Draw 7 ====
Friday, April 20, 10:00 am

Sheet C	1	2	3	4	5	6	7	8	Final
New Brunswick (Comeau) 🔨	1	0	0	2	0	0	3	X	6
Quebec (Lavoie)	0	2	0	0	0	0	0	X	2

Sheet F	1	2	3	4	5	6	7	8	Final
Prince Edward Island (Lenentine) 🔨	4	0	0	2	0	2	3	X	11
Northwest Territories (Bain)	0	2	0	0	2	0	0	X	4

==== Draw 8 ====
Friday, April 20, 2:00 pm

Sheet F	1	2	3	4	5	6	7	8	Final
British Columbia (Drexel)	0	1	0	0	0	1	0	X	2
Nova Scotia (Moore) 🔨	2	0	0	2	1	0	1	X	6

Sheet H	1	2	3	4	5	6	7	8	Final
Prince Edward Island (Lenentine)	1	1	0	0	1	0	2	0	5
New Brunswick (Comeau) 🔨	0	0	0	2	0	3	0	2	7

== Placement Round ==
=== Seeding Pool ===
==== Standings ====
Final Seeding Pool Standings

Team	Skip	W	L
Ontario	Kayla Gray	5	3
Prince Edward Island	Lauren Lenentine	4	4
Saskatchewan	Rachel Erickson	3	5
Newfoundland and Labrador	Mackenzie Glynn	3	5
British Columbia	Heather Drexel	2	6
Northwest Territories	Tyanna Bain	0	8

==== Seeding Pool Results ====
===== Draw 10 =====
Saturday, April 21, 10:00 am

Sheet G	1	2	3	4	5	6	7	8	Final
Newfoundland and Labrador (Glynn) 🔨	0	0	0	2	0	0	0	3	5
British Columbia (Drexel)	0	0	0	0	2	0	2	0	4

Sheet H	1	2	3	4	5	6	7	8	Final
Saskatchewan (Erickson)	1	0	0	0	1	0	1	X	3
Prince Edward Island (Lenentine) 🔨	0	1	1	3	0	1	0	X	6

Sheet I	1	2	3	4	5	6	7	8	Final
Ontario (Gray) 🔨	2	2	2	3	1	0	X	X	10
Northwest Territories (Bain)	0	0	0	0	0	1	X	X	1

===== Draw 11 =====
Saturday, April 21, 2:00 pm

Sheet A	1	2	3	4	5	6	7	8	Final
Ontario (Gray)	0	0	4	1	0	4	X	X	9
British Columbia (Drexel) 🔨	0	1	0	0	1	0	X	X	2

Sheet B	1	2	3	4	5	6	7	8	Final
Saskatchewan (Erickson) 🔨	6	1	3	1	1	0	X	X	12
Northwest Territories (Bain)	0	0	0	0	0	1	X	X	1

Sheet C	1	2	3	4	5	6	7	8	Final
Newfoundland and Labrador (Glynn)	0	1	0	0	0	0	X	X	1
Prince Edward Island (Lenentine) 🔨	2	0	0	1	2	1	X	X	6

===== Draw 12 =====
Saturday, April 21, 6:00 pm

Sheet C	1	2	3	4	5	6	7	8	Final
Saskatchewan (Erickson) 🔨	2	0	1	3	2	0	5	X	13
British Columbia (Drexel)	0	1	0	0	0	2	0	X	3

Sheet D	1	2	3	4	5	6	7	8	Final
Ontario (Gray) 🔨	1	1	3	0	1	0	1	X	7
Prince Edward Island (Lenentine)	0	0	0	2	0	1	0	X	3

Sheet F	1	2	3	4	5	6	7	8	Final
Newfoundland and Labrador (Glynn)	2	0	4	5	1	0	X	X	12
Northwest Territories (Bain) 🔨	0	1	0	0	0	0	X	X	1

=== Championship Pool ===
==== Championship Pool Standings ====
Final Championship Pool Standings

Key
Teams to Playoffs

Province	Skip	W	L
New Brunswick	Justine Comeau	7	1
Northern Ontario	Kira Brunton	5	3
Nova Scotia	Cally Moore	5	3
Quebec	Gabrielle Lavoie	5	3
Alberta	Abby Marks	5	3
Manitoba	Mackenzie Zacharias	4	4

==== Championship Pool Results ====
===== Draw 9 =====
Friday, April 20, 7:00 pm

Sheet D	1	2	3	4	5	6	7	8	Final
Quebec (Lavoie)	1	0	2	0	0	2	1	X	6
Northern Ontario (Brunton) 🔨	0	1	0	1	0	0	0	X	2

Sheet E	1	2	3	4	5	6	7	8	Final
Nova Scotia (Moore)	0	0	1	0	0	1	1	0	3
Manitoba (Zacharias) 🔨	1	0	0	1	4	0	0	1	7

Sheet F	1	2	3	4	5	6	7	8	Final
New Brunswick (Comeau)	0	0	1	0	2	1	0	X	4
Alberta (Marks) 🔨	1	1	0	2	0	0	3	X	7

===== Draw 10 =====
Saturday, April 21, 10:00 am

Sheet C	1	2	3	4	5	6	7	8	Final
Northern Ontario (Brunton) 🔨	0	1	0	1	1	1	0	1	5
Nova Scotia (Moore)	0	0	2	0	0	0	2	0	4

Sheet D	1	2	3	4	5	6	7	8	Final
Manitoba (Zacharias)	0	0	0	0	1	1	0	X	2
New Brunswick (Comeau) 🔨	1	1	1	2	0	0	1	X	7

Sheet E	1	2	3	4	5	6	7	8	Final
Alberta (Marks) 🔨	0	1	0	0	1	3	0	0	5
Quebec (Lavoie)	2	0	1	1	0	0	1	1	6

===== Draw 11 =====
Saturday, April 21, 2:00 pm

Sheet G	1	2	3	4	5	6	7	8	Final
Manitoba (Zacharias) 🔨	1	0	0	1	0	0	1	1	4
Quebec (Lavoie)	0	1	3	0	1	1	0	0	6

Sheet H	1	2	3	4	5	6	7	8	Final
Alberta (Marks) 🔨	0	0	0	1	0	0	X	X	1
Nova Scotia (Moore)	2	3	1	0	1	1	X	X	8

Sheet I	1	2	3	4	5	6	7	8	Final
Northern Ontario (Brunton)	0	0	0	1	1	0	0	1	3
New Brunswick (Comeau) 🔨	2	1	1	0	0	0	1	0	5

== Playoffs ==
Semifinals
1	New Brunswick	6
4	Quebec	5
2	Northern Ontario	6
3	Nova Scotia	1

Final
1	New Brunswick	4
2	Northern Ontario	8

Bronze medal game
4	Quebec	7
3	Nova Scotia	6

=== Semifinals ===
Sunday, April 22, 1:00 pm

Sheet A	1	2	3	4	5	6	7	8	Final
Northern Ontario (Brunton) 🔨	0	1	0	1	0	2	1	1	6
Nova Scotia (Moore)	0	0	0	0	1	0	0	0	1

Player percentages
Northern Ontario		Nova Scotia	
Jessica Leonard	87%	Cate Fitzgerald	61%
Sydnie Stinson	61%	Alexis Chiasson	48%
Kate Sherry	69%	Cassidy Currie	69%
Kira Brunton	87%	Cally Moore	62%
Total	75%	Total	60%

Sheet B	1	2	3	4	5	6	7	8	9	Final
New Brunswick (Comeau) 🔨	1	0	0	1	0	1	2	0	1	6
Quebec (Lavoie)	0	0	2	0	1	0	0	2	0	5

Player percentages
New Brunswick		Quebec	
Keira McLaughlin	88%	Julie Daigle	92%
Brigitte Comeau	66%	Anna Munroe	53%
Emma Le Blanc	61%	Patricia Boudreault	64%
Justine Comeau	88%	Gabrielle Lavoie	80%
Total	75%	Total	72%

=== Bronze medal game ===
Sunday, April 22, 5:15 pm

Sheet C	1	2	3	4	5	6	7	8	Final
Quebec (Lavoie)	1	0	0	0	0	3	3	0	7
Nova Scotia (Moore) 🔨	0	0	0	1	4	0	0	1	6

Player percentages
Quebec		Nova Scotia	
Julie Daigle	86%	Cate Fitzgerald	72%
Anna Munroe	88%	Alexis Chiasson	70%
Patricia Boudreault	59%	Cassidy Currie	55%
Gabrielle Lavoie	53%	Cally Moore	48%
Total	71%	Total	62%

=== Final ===
Sunday, April 22, 5:15 pm

Sheet D	1	2	3	4	5	6	7	8	Final
New Brunswick (Comeau) 🔨	1	0	0	1	0	2	0	X	4
Northern Ontario (Brunton)	0	4	1	0	1	0	2	X	8

Player percentages
New Brunswick		Northern Ontario	
Keira McLaughlin	83%	Jessica Leonard	46%
Brigitte Comeau	72%	Sydnie Stinson	56%
Emma Le Blanc	41%	Kate Sherry	70%
Justine Comeau	71%	Kira Brunton	77%
Total	67%	Total	63%

== Top 5 Player Percentages ==
Leads	%
(Quebec) Julie Daigle	82
(New Brunswick) Keira McLaughlin	81
(Newfoundland and Labrador) Camille Burt	80
(Ontario) Morgan Typhair	77
(Saskatchewan) Kelly Kay	73

Seconds	%
(New Brunswick) Brigitte Comeau	78
(Manitoba) Emily Zacharias	73
(Alberta) Jamie Scott	72
(Quebec) Anna Munroe	71
(Prince Edward Island) Tatiana Kelly	70

Thirds	%
(Newfoundland and Labrador) Katie Follett	74
(Manitoba) Morgan Reimer	74
(Alberta) Paige Papley	73
(Quebec) Patrica Boudreault	72
(Nova Scotia) Cassidy Currie	71

Skips	%
(New Brunswick) Justine Comeau	82
(Northern Ontario) Kira Brunton	76
(Alberta) Abby Marks	71
(Ontario) Kayla Gray	70
(Quebec) Gabrielle Lavoie	69

Team	%
New Brunswick	77
Quebec	73
Alberta	72
Northern Ontario	71
Ontario	70
