= 2019 WFG Tankard =

- Host city: Grand-Mère, Quebec
- Arena: Arèna de Grand-Mère
- Dates: January 13–20, 2019
- Winner: Team Crête
- Curling club: CC Etchemin, Saint-Romuald, CC Grand-Mère, Grand-Mère & Mt. Bruno CC, Saint-Bruno-de-Montarville
- Skip: Martin Crête
- Third: Philippe Lemay
- Second: Éric Sylvain
- Lead: Philippe Ménard
- Finalist: Mike Fournier

The 2019 WFG Tankard (French: Tankard WFG 2019) the Quebec men's provincial curling championship was held from January 13 to 20 at the Arèna de Grand-Mère in Grand-Mère, Quebec. The winning Martin Crête team represented Quebec at the 2019 Tim Hortons Brier in Brandon, Manitoba.

The event was held in conjunction with the 2019 Quebec Scotties Tournament of Hearts, Quebec's provincial women's curling championship.

The Martin Crête skipped rink (which had been skipped by 11-time provincial champion Jean-Michel Ménard in 2018 before he retired) won the event, defeating the 2018 champion Mike Fournier rink in the final.

== Teams ==
Teams were as follows

Skip	Third	Second	Lead	Alternate	Club(s)
Alek Bédard	Louis Quevillon	Julien Tremblay	Charles Auclair		Boucherville/Rimouski/Etchemin
Martin Crête	Philippe Lemay	Eric Sylvain	Philippe Ménard		Etchemin/Grand-Mère/Mont-Bruno
Martin Ferland	Don Bowser	Jason Camm	Vincent Bourget		Grand-Mère/des Collines/Trois-Rivières
Mike Fournier	Félix Asselin	William Dion	Jean-François Trépanier	Émile Asselin	Glenmore/Valleyfield/Drummondville
François Gagné	Jean-Michel Arsenault	Erik Lachance	Christian Bouchard		TMR
Scott Hill	Scott McClintock	Shawn Blair	Shane McRae		Ormstown
Steve Holdaway	Zackary Wise	Stewart Yaxley	Mike Chuipka		Glenmore
Mark Homan	Mike McLean	Colton Daly	Gary Findley		Des Collines
Yannick Martel	Jean-François Charest	Carl Lévesque	Stéphane Palin	François Gionest	Kénogami
Stéphane Michaud	David Jutras	Sylvain Proulx	Luc Bellefeuille		Trois-Rivières
Steven Munroe	Maxime Elmaleh	Jasmin Gibeau	Philippe Brassard		Etchemin/Thurso
Jean-Sébastien Roy	Robert Desjardins	Pierre-Luc Morissette	René Dubois		Des Collines/Chicoutimi/Kenogami/Victoria
Jeffrey Stewart	Matt Kennerknecht	Ben Vezeau	Jonathan Spring	Andrew Leigh	Glenmore
John Stewart	Blake Stoughton	François Hallé	David-Lee Amos		Valleyfield

== Preliminary round ==
=== Standings ===
Key
Teams to Championship Round
Teams to Tiebreaker

Pool A	W	L
Fournier	6	0
Ferland	4	2
Munroe	3	3
Martel	3	3
Je. Stewart	2	4
Jo. Stewart	2	4
Hill	1	5

Pool B	W	L
Roy	6	0
Crête	5	1
Homan	3	3
Gagné	3	3
Bédard	3	3
Michaud	1	5
Holdaway	0	6

=== Scores ===
The scores for the preliminary round were as follows:

==== January 13 ====
Draw 1

- Fournier 8-5 Munroe
- Ferland 10-7 Hill
- Martel 11-7 Jo. Stewart

Draw 2

- Crête 11-5 Homan
- Roy 9-1 Michaud
- Gagné 9-3 Holdaway

==== January 14 ====
Draw 3

- Jo. Stewart 7-0 Munroe
- Ferland 8-4 Je. Stewart
- Martel 10-6 Hill

Draw 4

- Homan 7-4 Holdaway
- Roy 7-5 Bédard
- Gagné 7-1 Michaud

Draw 5

- Je. Stewart 12-5 Martel
- Fournier 8-5 Jo. Stewart
- Munroe 9-3 Hill

Draw 6

- Gagné 6-2 Bédard
- Crête 10-2 Holdaway
- Homan 6-4 Michaud

==== January 15 ====
Draw 7

- Jo. Stewart 7-6 Hill
- Ferland 9-7 Munroe
- Fournier 10-3 Je. Stewart

Draw 8

- Michaud 5-3 Holdaway
- Roy 12-7 Homan
- Crête 11-3 Bédard

Draw 9

- Fournier 10-3 Martel
- Hill 5-4 Je. Stewart
- Ferland 9-4 Jo. Stewart 4

Draw 10

- Crête 10-9 Gagné
- Bédard 9-5 Michaud
- Roy 8-6 Holdaway

==== January 16 ====
Draw 11

- Roy 9-6 Gagné
- Crête 10-0 Michaud
- Bédard 8-7 Homan

Draw 12

- Martel 6-4 Ferland
- Fournier 11-3 Hill
- Munroe 8-7 Je. Stewart

Draw 13

- Bédard 11-6 Holdaway
- Roy 6-5 Crête
- Homan 9-3 Gagné

Draw 14

- Je. Stewart 7-6 Jo. Stewart
- Fournier 8-2 Ferland
- Munroe 9-7 Martel

==== Tiebreakers ====
January 17, 09:00

- Homan 7-2 Gagné
- Munroe 5-4 Martel

== Championship round ==
=== Standings ===
Key
Teams to Playoffs

Skip	W	L
Roy	9	0
Fournier	8	1
Crête	7	2
Homan	5	4
Ferland	4	5
Munroe	3	6

=== Scores ===
==== January 17 ====
Draw 15

- Crête 10-6 Ferland
- Roy 7-4 Munroe
- Fournier 9-7 Homan

Draw 16

- Homan 8-3 Munroe
- Fournier 7-4 Crête
- Roy 11-4 Ferland

==== January 18 ====
Draw 17

- Roy 7-5 Fournier
- Homan 8-2 Ferland
- Crête 8-2 Munroe

== Playoffs ==
Page playoff system
1	Jean-Sébastien Roy	2
2	Mike Fournier	8
3	Martin Crête	6
4	Mark Homan	5

Semifinal
1	Jean-Sébastien Roy	6
3	Martin Crête	7

Final
2	Mike Fournier	7
3	Martin Crête	8

=== 1 vs 2 ===
Friday, January 19, 09:00

Sheet C	1	2	3	4	5	6	7	8	9	10	Final
Jean-Sébastien Roy	1	0	0	0	0	0	1	0	0	X	2
Mike Fournier	0	2	0	2	0	1	0	1	2	X	8

=== 3 vs 4 ===
Friday, January 19, 09:00

Sheet D	1	2	3	4	5	6	7	8	9	10	Final
Martin Crête	1	0	2	0	1	0	0	2	0	0	6
Mark Homan	0	1	0	1	0	0	1	0	1	1	5

=== Semifinal ===
Saturday, January 19, 15:00

Sheet C	1	2	3	4	5	6	7	8	9	10	11	Final
Jean-Sébastien Roy	1	0	0	0	2	0	2	0	0	1	0	6
Martin Crête	0	0	0	1	0	2	0	2	1	0	1	7

=== Final ===
Sunday, January 20, 13:00

Sheet C	1	2	3	4	5	6	7	8	9	10	11	Final
Mike Fournier	0	0	3	0	0	1	0	2	0	1	0	7
Martin Crête	2	1	0	2	1	0	1	0	0	0	1	8

2019 WFG Tankard

Martin Crête
8th Quebec Provincial Championship title
