= 2017 New Brunswick Scotties Tournament of Hearts =

- Host city: Miramichi, New Brunswick
- Arena: Miramichi Curling Club
- Dates: January 25–29
- Winner: Team Adams
- Curling club: Capital Winter Club
- Skip: Melissa Adams
- Third: Jennifer Armstrong
- Second: Cathlia Ward
- Lead: Katie Forward
- Finalist: Sarah Mallais

The 2017 New Brunswick Scotties Tournament of Hearts, the provincial women's curling championship of New Brunswick was held January 25 to 29 at the Miramichi Curling Club in Miramichi, New Brunswick. The winning Melissa Adams team represented New Brunswick at the 2017 Scotties Tournament of Hearts in St. Catharines, Ontario.

Melissa Adams of Fredericton would win her first ever provincial Scotties title. She had previously won the 1998 World Junior Curling Championships. Adams had scored four points in the sixth end to defeat Saint John's Sarah Mallais rink in the final by a score of 9–6. The Adams rink represented New Brunswick at the national Scotties, where they had to compete in a pre-qualifying tournament against the Yukon, Nunavut and Northwest Territories to enter the main event. After going 3–0 in the round robin portion, they lost the final to the Northwest Territories and didn't enter the main draw.

== Teams ==
The teams are listed as follows:

| Skip | Third | Second | Lead | Club(s) |
|---|---|---|---|---|
| Melissa Adams | Jennifer Armstrong | Cathlia Ward | Katie Forward | Capital Winter Club, Fredericton |
| Justine Comeau | Emma Le Blanc | Brigitte Comeau | Keira McLaughlin | Capital Winter Club, Fredericton |
| Shelly Graham | Sharon Levesque | Connie Nichol | Jane McGinn | Capital Winter Club, Fredericton |
| Sarah Mallais | Carol Whitaker | Leah Thompson | Jane Boyle | Thistle-St. Andrew's Curling Club, Saint John |
| Shaelyn Park | Julia Goodin | Molli Ward | Lauren Whiteway | Curl Moncton, Moncton |
| Sylvie Robichaud | Jessica Ronalds | Nicole Arsenault Bishop | Michelle Majeau | Curl Moncton, Moncton |
| Shannon Tatlock | Sandy Comeau | Emily MacRae | Shelby Wilson | Curl Moncton, Moncton |

== Round robin standings ==
Key
| Teams to Playoffs |
| Teams to Tiebreaker |

| Skip | W | L |
|---|---|---|
| Sarah Mallais | 5 | 1 |
| Justine Comeau | 5 | 1 |
| Melissa Adams | 4 | 2 |
| Sylvie Robichaud | 4 | 2 |
| Shelly Graham | 2 | 4 |
| Shaelyn Park | 1 | 5 |
| Shannon Tatlock | 0 | 6 |

== Scores ==
Draw 1

- Adams 8-3 Graham
- Mallais 9-7 Park
- Robichaud 5-4 Tatlock

Draw 2

- Mallais 5-2 Tatlock
- Comeau 7-4 Robichaud
- Graham 6-5 Park

Draw 3

- Adams 9-2 Park
- Graham 4-3 Tatlock
- Mallais 8-2 Comeau

Draw 4

- Robichaud 7-4 Graham
- Comeau 9-4 Adams
- Park 6-3 Tatlock

Draw 5

- Comeau 8-4 Tatlock
- Robichaud 9-6 Park
- Adams 6-5 Mallais

Draw 6

- Mallais 6-4 Robichaud
- Adams 8-2 Tatlock
- Comeau 12-5 Graham

Draw 7

- Comeau 9-2 Park
- Mallais 7-5 Graham
- Robichaud 6-5 Adams

Tiebreaker

- Adams 7-4 Robichaud

== Playoffs ==
| Semifinal | | | Final |
| | | | 1 | Sarah Mallais | 6 |
| 2 | Justine Comeau | 5 | 2 | Melissa Adams | 9 |
| 3 | Melissa Adams | 6 |

=== Semifinal ===
Sunday, January 29, 9:00 am

| Team | 1 | 2 | 3 | 4 | 5 | 6 | 7 | 8 | 9 | 10 | Final |
|---|---|---|---|---|---|---|---|---|---|---|---|
| Justine Comeau 🔨 | 0 | 0 | 0 | 0 | 2 | 1 | 0 | 1 | 1 | X | 5 |
| Melissa Adams | 0 | 0 | 2 | 2 | 0 | 0 | 2 | 0 | 0 | X | 6 |

=== Final ===
Sunday, January 29, 2:00 pm

| Team | 1 | 2 | 3 | 4 | 5 | 6 | 7 | 8 | 9 | 10 | Final |
|---|---|---|---|---|---|---|---|---|---|---|---|
| Sarah Mallais 🔨 | 1 | 0 | 1 | 0 | 1 | 0 | 0 | 2 | 1 | 0 | 6 |
| Melissa Adams | 0 | 2 | 0 | 2 | 0 | 4 | 0 | 0 | 0 | 1 | 9 |

2017 New Brunswick Scotties Tournament of Hearts

Melissa Adams
1st New Brunswick Provincial Championship title
