= Jennifer Armstrong (curler) =

Canadian curler

Jennifer Fenwick
- Curler
- Born: August 1, 1992 (age 34); Saint John, New Brunswick

Team
- Curling club: Thistle-St. Andrews CC, Saint John, NB
- Skip: Andrea Kelly
- Third: Jennifer Fenwick
- Second: Erin Carmody
- Lead: Katie Vandenborre
- Mixed doubles partner: Tyrel Griffith

Curling career
- Member Association: New Brunswick (2011–2020; 2024–present); Saskatchewan (2020–2023); British Columbia (2023–2024)
- Hearts: 5 (2017, 2019, 2020, 2022, 2024)
- Top CTRS ranking: 6th (2021–22)

Jennifer Fenwick (born Jennifer Armstrong on August 1, 1992 in Saint John) is a Canadian curler from Rothesay, New Brunswick. She currently plays third on Team Andrea Kelly. She is a three-time New Brunswick Scotties Tournament of Hearts champion.

== Career ==
=== Juniors ===
Fenwick's first national level event was at the 2011 Canadian Junior Curling Championships. There, she skipped her team to a 7–5 round robin record. In 2012 she went on to represent New Brunswick again at the Canadian Juniors. In 2014, she represented UNB at the 2014 CIS/CCA Curling Championships.

=== Women's ===
Out of juniors, Fenwick joined the Melissa Adams rink at third. They competed in local World Curling Tour events with their best finish at the WFG Jim Sullivan Curling Classic where they won the title. At the 2016 New Brunswick Scotties Tournament of Hearts, the team made it all the way to the final where they just came up short to Team Robichaud.

The following season, the Adams rink returned to the provincial championship. After going 4–2 in the round robin, the team won the tiebreaker and the semifinal to advance to the final. There, they scored four points in the sixth end en route to a 9–6 win. It was just Fenwick's second provincial appearance. At the Hearts, the team would have to win the pre-qualifying event to qualify for the main draw. After going 3–0 in the round robin portion, they came up short in the final against Northwest Territories Kerry Galusha.

Adams left the team after the season to join the Robichaud rink. Fenwick stepped up to skip with Cathlia Ward playing third, Katie Forward remaining at lead and Jillian Babin coming in to play second. At provincials, the team lost in the semi-final to Sarah Mallais.

After Ward moved to skip her own team in Newfoundland and Labrador, the team brought on veteran Andrea Crawford to skip the team with Fenwick sliding down to second. At the 2019 New Brunswick Scotties Tournament of Hearts, Team Crawford posted a perfect 5–0 record en route to capturing the title. At the Hearts, the team went 3–4, missing the playoffs.

To start the 2019–20 curling season, Team Crawford won their first two events, the Steele Cup Cash and the Atlantic Superstore Monctonian Challenge. They played in a Grand Slam event, the 2019 Tour Challenge Tier 2. After a 2–2 round robin record, they lost the tiebreaker to Jestyn Murphy. The team defended their provincial title by winning the 2020 New Brunswick Scotties Tournament of Hearts in late January 2020. At the Hearts, the Crawford rink started with three losses before rallying off four wins in a row including scoring a seven ender against top-seeded Manitoba's Kerri Einarson rink to win 13–7 and defeating Team Canada (skipped by Chelsea Carey) 7–5. Their 4–3 round robin record qualified them for the tiebreaker against Saskatchewan's Robyn Silvernagle rink. Saskatchewan took two in the extra end for a 9–7 victory, eliminating New Brunswick from contention. After the season, Fenwick announced she would be moving to Saskatchewan for the 2020–21 season.

On March 19, 2020, it was announced that Fenwick would be joining the new team of Stephanie Schmidt, Brooklyn Stevenson, and Rachel Erickson. The team played in three local events during the abbreviated season, qualifying in one of them. After the season, Brooklyn Stevenson left the team. Fenwick, Schmidt and Erickson then added Chelsea Carey and Jolene Campbell for the 2021–22 season, shifting Fenwick to lead.

The new Team Carey found success in just their second event together, going undefeated to claim the Craven SPORTS Services Curling Classic tour event title. They then made the semifinals of the 2021 Curlers Corner Autumn Gold Curling Classic where they were eliminated by Tabitha Peterson. At the event, however, they were able to defeat the likes of Rachel Homan, Jennifer Jones and Jamie Sinclair en route to the semifinals. They also qualified for the playoffs at the Boundary Ford Curling Classic, SaskTour Women's Moose Jaw, Red Deer Curling Classic and the DeKalb Superspiel, however, were not able to reach the final in any of the four events. Their next event was the 2022 Saskatchewan Scotties Tournament of Hearts, which they entered as the top ranked team. Team Carey qualified through the A-side of the tournament with a perfect 3–0 record. This earned them a spot in the 1 vs. 2 page playoff game where they defeated Penny Barker. In the final, they once again faced the Barker rink. This time, Team Barker would win the match 7–5, despite Team Carey beating them in both the A Final and 1 vs. 2 page playoff game. Despite this, they still qualified for the 2022 Scotties Tournament of Hearts as Wild Card #2 after Curling Canada used the same format from the 2021 event due to the pandemic. At the championship, the team finished with a 4–4 round robin record, not advancing to the playoff round. Team Carey wrapped up their season at the 2022 Players' Championship where they missed the playoffs.

On April 3, 2022, the team announced that they would be disbanding at the end of the 2021–22 season. Fenwick and Schmidt later announced that they would be joining Nancy Martin and Krysten Karwacki on a newly formed team for the 2022–23 season. Martin would skip the team, with Schmidt playing third, Fenwick at second and Karwacki at lead. After a season together, Fenwick would then announce that she was joining the Corryn Brown rink out of British Columbia as their new second for the 2023–24 season. At the 2024 British Columbia Scotties Tournament of Hearts, the team would lose in the provincial final to Clancy Grandy. However, due to Nunavut would withdrawing from the 2024 Scotties Tournament of Hearts, the Brown rink was announced as the second Wild Card team. At the Scotties, Brown would finish the round robin with a 4–4 record, failing to advance to the playoff round.

Fenwick would later return to New Brunswick and join the Andrea Kelly rink as their new third for the 2025–26 curling season, alongside Erin Carmody and Katie Vandenborre. They would start the season off finishing second at the 2025 Steele Cup Cash tour event, and winning the Dave Jones Stanhope Simpson Insurance Mayflower Cashspiel.

=== Mixed ===
Fenwick would represent New Brunswick at the 2025 Canadian Mixed Curling Championship as the third on a team skipped by Rene Comeau, alongside Alex Robichaud, and her teammate from women's play, Katie Vandenborre. At the 2025 Canadian Mixed, they would win their first national championship, beating Ontario's Sam Mooibroek 6–5 in the final, qualifying to represent Canada at the 2026 World Mixed Curling Championship.

== Personal life ==
As of 2024, Armstrong resides in Rothesay, New Brunswick. She currently works as a Chartered Professional Accountant for Farm Credit Canada.

== Teams ==
Season	Skip	Third	Second	Lead	Alternate
2011–12	Jennifer Armstrong	Marissa Gale	Jessica Moore	Shelby Wilson	
2013–14	Jennifer Armstrong	Jaclyn Crandall	Shelby Wilson	Darie Tardif	
2015–16	Melissa Adams	Jennifer Armstrong	Cathlia Ward	Kendra Lister	
2016–17	Melissa Adams	Jennifer Armstrong	Cathlia Ward	Katie Forward	
2017–18	Jennifer Armstrong	Cathlia Ward	Jillian Babin	Katie Forward	
2018–19	Andrea Crawford	Jillian Babin	Jennifer Armstrong	Katie Forward	
2019–20	Andrea Crawford	Jennifer Armstrong	Jillian Babin	Katie Forward	
2020–21	Stephanie Schmidt	Brooklyn Stevenson	Jennifer Armstrong	Rachel Erickson	
2021–22	Chelsea Carey	Jolene Campbell	Stephanie Schmidt	Jennifer Armstrong	Rachel Erickson
2022–23	Nancy Martin	Lindsay Bertsch	Jennifer Armstrong	Krysten Karwacki	
2023–24	Corryn Brown	Erin Pincott	Jennifer Armstrong	Samantha Fisher	
2024–25	Sylvie Quillian	Jennifer Armstrong	Erin Carmody	Katie Vandenborre	
2025–26	Andrea Kelly	Jennifer Fenwick	Erin Carmody	Katie Vandenborre	
