= Cathlia Ward =

Canadian curler

- Curler
- Born: May 14, 1994 (age 32); Halifax, Nova Scotia

Team
- Curling club: Sutherland CC, Saskatoon, SK
- Skip: Cathlia Ward
- Third: Alyssa Kostyk
- Second: Sarah Hoag
- Lead: Alison Ingram

Curling career
- Member Association: New Brunswick (2010–2018; 2019–2020); Newfoundland and Labrador (2018–19); Saskatchewan (2022–present)
- Hearts: 1 (2017)
- Top CTRS ranking: 39th (2017–18)

Cathlia Mary Ward (born May 14, 1994) is a Canadian curler. She currently skips her own team out of Saskatoon.

== Career ==
=== Juniors ===
Ward's first national level event was at the 2013 Canadian Junior Curling Championships as third for Jessica Daigle. There, her team went 4–6 threw the round robin and championship pool, missing the playoffs. She returned the following year with the same team as in 2013 and they once again went 4–6. She was the alternate for Corryn Brown at the 2013 World Junior Curling Championships where the team went 3–6.

=== Women's ===
Out of juniors, Ward joined the Melissa Adams rink at second. They competed in local World Curling Tour events with their best finish at the WFG Jim Sullivan Curling Classic where they won the title. At the 2016 New Brunswick Scotties Tournament of Hearts, the team made it all the way to the final where they just came up short to Team Robichaud.

The following season, the Adams rink returned to the provincial championship. After going 4–2 in the round robin, the team won the tiebreaker and the semi-final to advance to the final. There, they scored four points in the sixth end en route to a 9–6 win. It was just Ward's second provincial appearance. At the Hearts, the team would have to win the pre-qualifying event to qualify for the main draw. After going 3–0 in the round robin portion, they came up short in the final against Northwest Territories Kerry Galusha.

Adams left the team after the season to join the Robichaud rink and Jillian Babin joined the team at second. At provincials, the team lost in the semifinal to Sarah Mallais.

Ward left the Armstrong team after the season and made a new team curling out of Newfoundland and Labrador. The team played in the 2019 Newfoundland and Labrador Scotties Tournament of Hearts where they lost the final to Kelli Sharpe.

The following season, she joined the Sarah Mallais rink at third. They missed the playoffs in their first event, the Steele Cup Cash. At the 2020 New Brunswick Scotties Tournament of Hearts, they missed the playoffs with a 2–3 record.

== Teams ==
Season	Skip	Third	Second	Lead
2010–11	Cathlia Ward	Jane DiCarlo	Katelyn Kelly	Katie Forward
2012–13	Jessica Daigle	Cathlia Ward	Natalie Menzies	Katie Forward
2013–14	Melissa Adams	Jennifer Armstrong	Cathlia Ward	Kendra Lister
2014–15	Melissa Adams	Jennifer Armstrong	Cathlia Ward	Kendra Lister
2015–16	Melissa Adams	Jennifer Armstrong	Cathlia Ward	Kendra Lister
2016–17	Melissa Adams	Jennifer Armstrong	Cathlia Ward	Katie Forward
2017–18	Jennifer Armstrong	Cathlia Ward	Jillian Babin	Katie Forward
2018–19	Cathlia Ward	Jessica Cunningham	Noelle Thomas-Kennell	Cindy Miller
2019–20	Sarah Mallais	Cathlia Ward	Jodie deSolla	Jane Boyle
2022–23	Amélie Blais	Cathlia Ward	Paige Engel	Alison Ingram
2023–24	Amélie Blais	Alyssa Kostyk	Alison Ingram	Cathlia Ward
2024–25	Cathlia Ward	Alyssa Kostyk	Sarah Hoag	Alison Ingram
