= Katie Vandenborre =

Canadian curler (born 1994)

- Curler
- Born: September 11, 1994 (age 32); Fredericton, New Brunswick

Team
- Curling club: Capital WC, Fredericton, NB
- Skip: Andrea Kelly
- Third: Jennifer Armstrong
- Second: Erin Carmody
- Lead: Katie Vandenborre

Curling career
- Member Association: New Brunswick (2010–2023; 2024–present); Nova Scotia (2023–2024)
- Hearts: 5 (2017, 2019, 2020, 2022, 2023)
- Top CTRS ranking: 11th (2022–23)
Medal record
Representing New Brunswick
Scotties Tournament of Hearts
Bronze medal – third place	2022 Thunder Bay

Katie Vandenborre (née Forward; born September 11, 1994) is a Canadian curler from Fredericton, New Brunswick. She currently plays lead on Team Andrea Kelly. She has won four New Brunswick Scotties Tournament of Hearts and two New Brunswick junior titles.

== Career ==
=== Juniors ===
Vandenborre's first national level event was at the 2013 Canadian Junior Curling Championships as lead for Jessica Daigle. There, her team went 4–6 threw the round robin and championship pool, missing the playoffs. She returned the following year with the same team as in 2013 and they once again went 4–6.

=== Women's ===
Out of juniors, Vandenborre joined the Melissa Adams rink. She was the teams alternate before moving up to lead following Lister's departure. They competed at the 2017 New Brunswick Scotties Tournament of Hearts which was Vandenborre's second, having been the teams alternate the previous year. After going 4–2 in the round robin, the team won the tiebreaker and the semifinal to advance to the final. There, they scored four points in the sixth end en route to a 9–6 win. At the Hearts, the team would have to win the pre-qualifying event to qualify for the main draw. After going 3–0 in the round robin portion, they came up short in the final against Northwest Territories Kerry Galusha.

Adams left the team after the season to join the Robichaud rink and Jillian Babin joined the team at second. At provincials, the team lost in the semifinal to Sarah Mallais.

After Ward moved to skip her own team in Newfoundland and Labrador, the team brought on veteran Andrea Crawford to skip the team. At the 2019 New Brunswick Scotties Tournament of Hearts, Team Crawford posted a perfect 5–0 record en route to capturing the title. At the Hearts, the team went 3–4, missing the playoffs.

To start the 2019–20 curling season, Team Crawford won their first two events, the Steele Cup Cash and the Atlantic Superstore Monctonian Challenge. They played in a Grand Slam event, the 2019 Tour Challenge Tier 2. After a 2–2 round robin record, they lost the tiebreaker to Jestyn Murphy. The team defended their provincial title by winning the 2020 New Brunswick Scotties Tournament of Hearts in late January 2020. At the Hearts, the Crawford rink started with three losses before rallying off four wins in a row including scoring a seven ender against top-seeded Manitoba's Kerri Einarson rink to win 13–7 and defeating Team Canada (skipped by Chelsea Carey) 7–5. Their 4–3 round robin record qualified them for the tiebreaker against Saskatchewan's Robyn Silvernagle rink. Saskatchewan took two in the extra end for a 9–7 victory, eliminating New Brunswick from contention. The team announced on June 18, 2020 that they would be adding Sylvie Quillian to the team at third.

Due to the COVID-19 pandemic in New Brunswick, the 2021 provincial championship was cancelled. As the reigning provincial champions, Team Crawford was given the invitation to represent New Brunswick at the 2021 Scotties Tournament of Hearts, but they declined due to work and family commitments. Team Melissa Adams was then invited in their place, which they accepted.

Team Crawford played in five tour events during the 2021–22 season, performing well in all of them. In their first event, The Curling Store Cashspiel, the team reached the final where they lost to Nova Scotia's Christina Black upon giving up a stolen victory. They then lost in the final of the Steele Cup Cash two weeks later to the Melodie Forsythe rink. They would then secure two victories in their next two events, going undefeated to claim the titles of the Dave Jones Stanhope Simpson Insurance Mayflower Cashspiel and the Atlantic Superstore Monctonian Challenge. The team then had a semifinal finish at the Stu Sells 1824 Halifax Classic, dropping the semifinal game to Switzerland's Corrie Hürlimann.

The 2022 New Brunswick Scotties Tournament of Hearts was cancelled due to the pandemic and Team Crawford were selected to represent their province at the 2022 Scotties Tournament of Hearts in Thunder Bay, Ontario. At the Hearts, the team began the event with five straight wins, the most consecutive wins to start a Tournament of Hearts of any New Brunswick team. Team Crawford finished the round robin with a 6–2 record, qualifying for the playoff round over higher seeded teams such as Wild Card #2 (Chelsea Carey), Wild Card #3 (Emma Miskew) and Saskatchewan's Penny Barker. They then defeated the Northwest Territories' Kerry Galusha in the knockout round and upset Team Canada's Kerri Einarson to reach the 1 vs. 2 page playoff game, becoming the first New Brunswick team to reach the playoffs since Heidi Hanlon in 1991. They then lost to Northern Ontario's Krista McCarville in the 1 vs. 2 game and Canada's Einarson rink in the semifinal, earning the bronze medal from the event. After the event, the team announced they would be parting ways with second Jillian Babin due to her relocation to Ontario. They then announced on March 4, 2022 that Jill Brothers would be joining them as their new second.

With the 2022 PointsBet Invitational being held in Fredericton, Team Kelly qualified as the host team. In the first round, they lost to Jennifer Jones 9–5 and were eliminated. On tour, the team qualified for the playoffs in all six events they played in, however, did not win any titles. They began with back-to-back quarterfinal appearances at the 2022 Stu Sells Toronto Tankard and the 2022 Tour Challenge Tier 2 Slam event. They then reached two consecutive semifinals at the Lady Monctonian and the 2022 Stu Sells 1824 Halifax Classic. In November, they went undefeated at the Jim Sullivan Curling Classic until the final where they lost to Suzanne Birt. They then reached the quarterfinals of the DeKalb Superspiel. In the new year, the team continued their dominance in New Brunswick, going undefeated through the prelim and provincial championship to win the 2023 New Brunswick Scotties Tournament of Hearts. In the final, they beat Abby Burgess 10–5. This qualified them for the 2023 Scotties Tournament of Hearts in Kamloops, British Columbia. After much success in 2022, the team finished seventh in their pool at the Hearts with a 3–5 record, only managing wins against Wild Card #2, Newfoundland and Labrador and the Yukon. After the Scotties, Kelly announced she would be leaving the team to join the Krista McCarville rink out of Northern Ontario with the rest of Team Kelly disbanding.

Initially without a team for the 2023–24 season, Vandenborre joined the Jessica Daigle rink from Nova Scotia in November 2023 after Mary Myketyn-Driscoll left the team in October. At the 2024 Nova Scotia Scotties Tournament of Hearts, Team Daigle would go 3–3, just missing out on the playoffs.

Vandenborre would then return to New Brunswick for the 2024–25 season as the lead on the Sylvie Quillian rink, alongside Jennifer Fenwick and Erin Carmody. At the 2025 New Brunswick Women's Curling Championship, Quillian would go 2–3, missing the playoffs. In the offseason, Fenwick, Carmody and Vandenborre would announce that they would be skipped by Andrea Kelly for the 2025–26 curling season, who was returning to New Brunswick after spending two seasons in Northern Ontario. They would start the season off well, finishing second at the 2025 Steele Cup Cash tour event, and winning the Dave Jones Stanhope Simpson Insurance Mayflower Cashspiel.

=== Mixed ===
Vandenborre has represented New Brunswick at two Canadian Mixed Curling Championships. In 2019, she was the lead on a team with Chris Jeffrey, Jillian Babin and Brian King. The team finished 2–4 at the 2019 Canadian Mixed Curling Championship, missing the playoffs. Vandenborre would return to represent New Brunswick at the 2025 Canadian Mixed Curling Championship again as the lead, this time on a team skipped by Rene Comeau, alongside Alex Robichaud, and her teammate from women's play, Jennifer Fenwick. At the 2025 Canadian Mixed, they would win their first national championship, beating Ontario's Sam Mooibroek 6–5 in the final, qualifying to represent Canada at the 2026 World Mixed Curling Championship.

== Personal life ==
Vandenborre is employed as a registered nurse with the Horizon Health Network and NurseSimple. She married Josh Vandenborre in August 2023. She studied at the University of New Brunswick.

== Teams ==
Season	Skip	Third	Second	Lead
2010–11	Cathlia Ward	Jane DiCarlo	Katelyn Kelly	Katie Forward
2012–13	Jessica Daigle	Cathlia Ward	Natalie Menzies	Katie Forward
2013–14	Jessica Daigle	Cathlia Ward	Natalie Menzies	Katie Forward
2016–17	Melissa Adams	Jennifer Armstrong	Cathlia Ward	Katie Forward
2017–18	Jennifer Armstrong	Cathlia Ward	Jillian Babin	Katie Forward
2018–19	Andrea Crawford	Jillian Babin	Jennifer Armstrong	Katie Forward
2019–20	Andrea Crawford	Jennifer Armstrong	Jillian Babin	Katie Forward
2020–21	Andrea Crawford	Sylvie Quillian	Jillian Babin	Katie Forward
2021–22	Andrea Crawford	Sylvie Quillian	Jillian Babin	Katie Forward
2022–23	Andrea Kelly	Sylvie Quillian	Jill Brothers	Katie Forward
2023–24	Jessica Daigle	Marlee Powers	Lindsey Burgess	Katie Vandenborre
2024–25	Sylvie Quillian	Jennifer Armstrong	Erin Carmody	Katie Vandenborre
2025–26	Andrea Kelly	Jennifer Fenwick	Erin Carmody	Katie Vandenborre
