= 2020 New Brunswick Scotties Tournament of Hearts =

- Host city: Rothesay, New Brunswick
- Arena: Riverside Golf and Curling Club
- Dates: January 23–26
- Winner: Team Crawford
- Curling club: Gage Golf & CC, Oromocto
- Skip: Andrea Crawford
- Third: Jennifer Armstrong
- Second: Jillian Babin
- Lead: Katie Forward
- Coach: Daryell Nowlan
- Finalist: Sylvie Quillian

The 2020 New Brunswick Scotties Tournament of Hearts, the provincial women's curling championship for New Brunswick, was held from January 23–26 at the Riverside Golf and Curling Club in Rothesay, New Brunswick. The winning Andrea Crawford rink represented New Brunswick at the 2020 Scotties Tournament of Hearts in Moose Jaw, Saskatchewan and finished with a 4–4 record.

Andrea Crawford won her second straight and ninth overall New Brunswick Scotties Tournament of Hearts defeating Sylvie Quillian 6–3 in the final.

== Qualification process ==
Qualification	Berths	Qualifying teams
Prelims	6	Sarah Mallais; Justine Comeau; Sylvie Quillian; Andrea Crawford; Sharon Levesque; Karen Cousins

== Teams ==
The teams are listed as follows:

Skip	Third	Second	Lead	Alternate	Club
Justine Comeau	Erica Cluff	Leah Thompson	Keira McLaughlin		Capital Winter Club
Karen Cousins	Ashley Cormier	Sarah Durley	Rachel Brewer		Thistle Saint Andrew Curling Club
Andrea Crawford	Jennifer Armstrong	Jillian Babin	Katie Forward		Gage Golf & Curling Club
Sarah Mallais	Cathlia Ward	Jodie deSolla	Jane Boyle		Curl Moncton
Sharon Levesque	Michelle Majeau	Michelle Blizzard	Taylor Devlin		Curl Moncton
Sylvie Quillian	Melissa Adams	Nicole Arsenault Bishop	Kendra Lister	Jaclyn Tingley	Curl Moncton

== Round Robin Standings ==
Final Round Robin Standings

Key
Teams to Playoffs

Skip	W	L
Andrea Crawford	5	0
Justine Comeau	4	1
Sylvie Quillian	3	2
Sarah Mallais	2	3
Sharon Levesque	1	4
Karen Cousins	0	5

== Round Robin Results ==
All draw times are listed in Atlantic Time (UTC-04:00).

=== Draw 1 ===
Thursday, January 23, 1:00 pm

Sheet 2	1	2	3	4	5	6	7	8	9	10	Final
Sylvie Quillian	0	0	0	1	0	3	0	0	0	1	5
Sharon Levesque	1	0	0	0	1	0	1	1	0	0	4

Sheet 3	1	2	3	4	5	6	7	8	9	10	Final
Sarah Mallais	0	1	1	0	5	0	2	4	X	X	13
Karen Cousins	3	0	0	1	0	2	0	0	X	X	6

Sheet 4	1	2	3	4	5	6	7	8	9	10	Final
Justine Comeau	0	1	0	0	0	1	0	0	X	X	2
Andrea Crawford	1	0	2	2	1	0	2	1	X	X	9

=== Draw 2 ===
Thursday, January 23, 7:00 pm

Sheet 2	1	2	3	4	5	6	7	8	9	10	Final
Karen Cousins	0	1	0	1	0	0	1	0	X	X	3
Andrea Crawford	1	0	4	0	1	1	0	3	X	X	10

Sheet 3	1	2	3	4	5	6	7	8	9	10	Final
Justine Comeau	0	0	3	0	0	1	0	0	1	2	7
Sylvie Quillian	0	0	0	1	1	0	3	0	0	0	5

Sheet 4	1	2	3	4	5	6	7	8	9	10	Final
Sharon Levesque	0	1	0	0	0	0	0	1	0	X	2
Sarah Mallais	1	0	1	1	2	0	1	0	2	X	8

=== Draw 3 ===
Friday, January 24, 1:00 pm

Sheet 1	1	2	3	4	5	6	7	8	9	10	Final
Justine Comeau	2	3	1	0	2	0	X	X	X	X	8
Sharon Levesque	0	0	0	0	0	2	X	X	X	X	2

Sheet 3	1	2	3	4	5	6	7	8	9	10	Final
Andrea Crawford	2	3	0	4	0	0	2	1	X	X	12
Sarah Mallais	0	0	4	0	1	1	0	0	X	X	6

Sheet 4	1	2	3	4	5	6	7	8	9	10	Final
Sylvie Quillian	0	3	0	1	0	2	0	0	3	X	9
Karen Cousins	1	0	1	0	1	0	1	1	0	X	5

=== Draw 4 ===
Friday, January 24, 7:00 pm

Sheet 1	1	2	3	4	5	6	7	8	9	10	Final
Sarah Mallais	0	0	0	0	0	2	0	X	X	X	2
Sylvie Quillian	1	1	2	1	1	0	3	X	X	X	9

Sheet 3	1	2	3	4	5	6	7	8	9	10	Final
Karen Cousins	0	4	0	2	1	0	0	1	0	X	8
Justine Comeau	2	0	3	0	0	4	2	0	1	X	12

Sheet 4	1	2	3	4	5	6	7	8	9	10	Final
Andrea Crawford	0	2	0	0	3	1	2	0	2	X	10
Sharon Levesque	0	0	1	1	0	0	0	1	0	X	3

=== Draw 5 ===
Saturday, January 25, 9:00 am

Sheet 2	1	2	3	4	5	6	7	8	9	10	Final
Sharon Levesque	1	0	1	1	0	0	1	2	0	2	8
Karen Cousins	0	3	0	0	1	1	0	0	1	0	6

Sheet 3	1	2	3	4	5	6	7	8	9	10	Final
Sylvie Quillian	0	1	0	1	0	1	0	0	1	0	4
Andrea Crawford	0	0	2	0	1	0	1	1	0	2	7

Sheet 4	1	2	3	4	5	6	7	8	9	10	11	Final
Sarah Mallais	0	2	1	0	2	0	2	0	0	0	0	7
Justine Comeau	1	0	0	1	0	1	0	1	2	1	1	8

== Playoffs ==
Semifinal			Final
			1	Andrea Crawford	6
2	Justine Comeau	7	3	Sylvie Quillian	3
3	Sylvie Quillian	8

=== Semifinal ===
Saturday, January 25, 7:00 pm

Sheet 3	1	2	3	4	5	6	7	8	9	10	Final
Justine Comeau	1	0	1	0	0	2	1	2	0	0	7
Sylvie Quillian	0	2	0	3	1	0	0	0	1	1	8

=== Final ===
Sunday, January 26, 2:00 pm

Sheet 4	1	2	3	4	5	6	7	8	9	10	Final
Andrea Crawford	0	0	3	0	1	0	0	1	1	X	6
Sylvie Quillian	1	0	0	1	0	1	0	0	0	X	3

2020 New Brunswick Scotties Tournament of Hearts

Andrea Crawford
9th New Brunswick Provincial Championship title

== Qualification ==
=== Prelims ===
January 10–12, Curl Moncton, Moncton

A Event
Justine Comeau (CWC)	8
Karen Cousins (TSA)	1
Sarah Mallais (Moncton)	6
Sharon Levesque (Moncton)	4

Semifinals
Andrea Crawford (Gage)	6
Justine Comeau (CWC)	7
Sylvie Quillian (Moncton)	4
Sarah Mallais (Moncton)	9

Qualifier 1
Justine Comeau (CWC)	4
Sarah Mallais (Moncton)	8

B Event		Qualifier 3
Sylvie Quillian (Moncton)	8
Karen Cousins (TSA)	2	Sylvie Quillian (Moncton)	8
Andrea Crawford (Gage)	8	Andrea Crawford (Gage)	7
Sharon Levesque (Moncton)	1

C Event / Qualifier 5
Karen Cousins (TSA)	2
Sharon Levesque (Moncton)	8
