= Anna Munroe =

Canadian curler

- Curler
- Born: September 11, 2001 (age 25); Quebec City, Quebec

Team
- Curling club: CC Jacques-Cartier & CC Victoria, Quebec City, QC
- Skip: Amanda Sluchinski
- Third: Kate Goodhelpsen
- Second: Anna Munroe
- Lead: Amy Wheatcroft

Curling career
- Member Association: Quebec (2016–2020); Alberta (2021–present)
- Hearts: 1 (2019)
- Top CTRS ranking: 37th (2022–23)

Anna Munroe (born September 11, 2001) is a Canadian curler from Quebec City, Quebec. She currently plays second on Team Amanda Sluchinski.

== Career ==
Munroe made her first national appearance in 2017 at the 2017 Canadian U18 Curling Championships as second for Gabrielle Lavoie. After a 5–3 round-robin record, her team lost in the semifinals against New Brunswick's Justine Comeau. They rebounded in the bronze medal game, defeating Nova Scotia's Cally Moore to claim the bronze medal. Team Lavoie surprised many at the 2019 Quebec Scotties Tournament of Hearts where they took the provincial title by defeating 2018 champion Émilia Gagné in the final. At the 2019 Scotties Tournament of Hearts, the Quebec team struggled, ultimately finishing the week in last place with a 0–7 record. However, Munroe, at age 17, officially became the youngest competitor to ever play in the event. Anna Munroe spared for the Noémie Gauthier rink at the 2020 Canadian Junior Curling Championships. After a 6–4 round-robin record, Quebec faced Alberta in a tiebreaker, which they lost, eliminating them from contention.

After graduating high school, Munroe was recruited to the University of Alberta Pandas curling team where she played lead on the junior team led by Serena Gray-Withers. In 2022, with teammates Zoe Cinnamon and Brianna Cullen, the team won the Alberta junior championship, defeating Olivia Jones 6–5 in the provincial final. This qualified the team for the 2022 Canadian Junior Curling Championships where they finished 5–3 in the round robin, enough to qualify for the playoffs. They then lost 7–4 to Ontario's Emily Deschenes in the quarterfinals, eliminating them in fifth place.

== Personal life ==
Munroe was previously an arts, literature and communications student at the Champlain College St. Lawrence. She is now enrolled at the University of Alberta and is studying Primary Education at Campus St. Jean. She is queer.

== Teams ==
Season	Skip	Third	Second	Lead	Alternate
2016–17	Gabrielle Lavoie	Patricia Boudreault	Anna Munroe	Julie Daigle	
2017–18	Gabrielle Lavoie	Patricia Boudreault	Anna Munroe	Julie Daigle	
2018–19	Gabrielle Lavoie	Patricia Boudreault	Anna Munroe	Julie Daigle	Marie-France Larouche
2019–20	Hannah Gargul	Anna Munroe	Amber Gargul	Kyra Johnson	
2021–22	Serena Gray-Withers	Zoe Cinnamon	Brianna Cullen	Anna Munroe	Emma Wiens
2022–23	Gracelyn Richards	Rachel Jacques	Amy Wheatcroft	Anna Munroe	
2023–24	Kaitlyn Bowman	Hannah Phillips	Anna Munroe	Sasha Tran	
2024–25	Hannah Phillips	Kate Goodhelpsen	Anna Munroe	Sasha Tran	
2025–26	Amanda Sluchinski	Kate Goodhelpsen	Anna Munroe	Joanne Tarvit	
2026–27	Amanda Sluchinski	Kate Goodhelpsen	Anna Munroe	Amy Wheatcroft	
