= 2019 Quebec Scotties Tournament of Hearts =

- Host city: Grand-Mère, Quebec
- Arena: Arèna de Grand-Mère
- Dates: January 13–20, 2019
- Winner: Team Lavoie
- Curling club: CC Victoria, Sainte-Foy, CC Jacques-Cartier, Sillery & CC Etchemin, Saint Romuald
- Skip: Gabrielle Lavoie
- Third: Patricia Boudreault
- Second: Anna Munroe
- Lead: Julie Daigle
- Finalist: Émilia Gagné

The 2019 Quebec Scotties Tournament of Hearts, the provincial women's curling championship of Quebec, was held from January 13 to 20 at the Arèna de Grand-Mère in Grand-Mère, Quebec. The winning team, Team Lavoie, represented Quebec at the 2019 Scotties Tournament of Hearts, Canada's national women's curling championship, finishing 8th in their 8-team pool.

The event was held in conjunction with the 2019 WFG Tankard, the provincial men's curling championship.

== Teams ==
The teams are listed as follows:

Skip	Third	Second	Lead	Alternate	Club(s)
Amélie Blais	Janique Berthelot	Brittany O'Rourke	Vicky Tremblay	Joëlle Sabourin	Etchemin/Glenmore/Laval/Bel Air
Gabrielle Lavoie	Patricia Boudreault	Anna Munroe	Julie Daigle		Victoria/Jacques-Cartier/Etchemin
Roxane Perron	Lisa Davies	Alison Davies	Kelly Tremblay		Etchemin / Glenmore
Noémie Verreault	Alanna Routledge	Marie-Pier Côté	Jill Routledge	Émilie Desjardins	Chicoutimi/Glenmore/Trois-Rivières
Émilia Gagné	Mélina Perron	Marie-Pier Harvey	Chloé Arnaud		Riverbend / Dolbeau

== Standings ==
Key
Teams to Playoffs
Teams to Tiebreaker

Skip	W	L
Lavoie	5	3
Gagné	5	3
Verreault	4	4
Perron	4	4
Blais	2	6

== Scores ==
=== January 13 ===
Draw 2

- Gagné 7-4 Perron
- Verreault 9-8 Lavoie

=== January 14 ===
Draw 4

- Lavoie 7-4 Gagné
- Perron 10-9 Blais

Draw 6

- Perron 10-9 Verreault
- Gagné 10-6 Blais

=== January 15 ===
Draw 8

- Blais 7-6 Verreault
- Perron 6-5 Lavoie

Draw 10

- Verreault 5-6 Gagné
- Blais 5-6 Lavoie

=== January 16 ===
Draw 12

- Gagné 9-7 Perron
- Lavoie 7-5 Verreault

Draw 14

- Gagné 8-7 Lavoie
- Perron 10-5 Blais

=== January 17 ===
Draw 15

- Blais 8-6 Gagné
- Verreault 9-8 Perron

Draw 16

- Verreault 9-4 Gagné
- Lavoie 6-5 Blais

=== January 18 ===
Draw 17

- Lavoie 8-3 Perron
- Verreault 6-5 Blais

Tiebreaker

- Perron 5-2 Verreault

== Playoffs ==
Semifinal			Final
			1	Gabrielle Lavoie	6
2	Émilia Gagné	6	2	Émilia Gagné	5
3	Roxane Perron	4

=== Semifinal ===
Saturday, January 19, 15:00

Sheet C	1	2	3	4	5	6	7	8	9	10	Final
Émilia Gagné	0	0	0	2	0	0	1	0	2	1	6
Roxane Perron	0	1	0	0	0	2	0	1	0	0	4

=== Final ===
Sunday, January 19, 9:00

Sheet C	1	2	3	4	5	6	7	8	9	10	Final
Gabrielle Lavoie	0	0	1	0	3	0	0	1	1	0	6
Émilia Gagné	0	1	0	2	0	1	0	0	0	1	5

2019 Quebec Scotties Tournament of Hearts

Gabrielle Lavoie
1st Quebec Provincial Championship title
