= Keira McLaughlin =

Canadian curler

- Curler
- Born: Keira McLaughlin; April 5, 2000 (age 26); Fredericton, New Brunswick

Team
- Curling club: Dixie CC, Mississauga
- Skip: Chelsea Principi
- Third: Lauren Peskett
- Second: Brenda Chapman
- Lead: Keira McLaughlin
- Mixed doubles partner: Tanner Horgan

Curling career
- Member Association: New Brunswick (2013–2020); Northern Ontario (2021–2022); Ontario (2022–present)
- Other appearances: CJCC: 4 (2015, 2016, 2018, 2019)
- Top CTRS ranking: 20th (2024–25)

Keira McLaughlin (born April 5, 2000) is a Canadian curler originally from Fredericton, New Brunswick. She currently plays lead on Team Chelsea Principi.

== Career ==
=== Juniors ===
McLaughlin has represented New Brunswick at four Canadian Junior Curling Championships with two bronze medals to her name in 2016 and 2018. She also has a very accomplished Under 18 championship record. She won silver medals in both 2016 and 2017 at the 2016 U18 International Curling Championships and the 2017 Canadian U18 Curling Championships. Still of junior age, she has participated in the past few New Brunswick Scotties Tournament of Hearts. In 2017, they lost the semifinal to the Melissa Adams rink and in 2018 they lost the tiebreaker to Sarah Mallais. She did not participate in the 2019 playdowns as she was at the 2019 Canadian Junior Curling Championships. The Comeau rink would lose another semifinal at the 2020 provincials, this time to the Sylvie Quillian rink. Later that season, Team Comeau represented the UNB Reds at the 2020 U Sports/Curling Canada University Curling Championships. There, they made it all the way to the final where they lost to the Alberta Pandas skipped by Selena Sturmay.

=== Women's ===
McLaughlin would notably move to Ontario and play lead for Chelsea Principi. In the 2026–27 curling season, they would find success winning the Grand Slam of Curling Satellite event at the 2026 Swiss Chalet Women's Curling Stadium Spiel by going undefeated in the event and beating South Korea's Kim Kyeong-ae 10–3 in the final. This qualified Team Principi for their first official Grand Slam at the 2026 GSOC Open.

== Personal life ==
She currently lives in Mississauga.

== Teams ==
Season	Skip	Third	Second	Lead
2013–14	Justine Comeau	Emma Le Blanc	Brigitte Comeau	Keira McLaughlin
2014–15	Justine Comeau	Emma Le Blanc	Brigitte Comeau	Keira McLaughlin
2015–16	Justine Comeau	Emma Le Blanc	Brigitte Comeau	Keira McLaughlin
2016–17	Justine Comeau	Emma Le Blanc	Brigitte Comeau	Keira McLaughlin
2017–18	Justine Comeau	Emma Le Blanc	Brigitte Comeau	Keira McLaughlin
2018–19	Justine Comeau	Emma Le Blanc	Brigitte Comeau	Keira McLaughlin
2019–20	Justine Comeau	Erica Cluff	Brigitte Comeau; Leah Thompson (Note: Leah Thompson replaced Brigitte Comeau halfway through the season as Comeau stepped back from competitive curling.)	Keira McLaughlin
2021–22	Marie-Elaine Little	Abby Deschene	Keira McLaughlin	Zoe Valliere
2022–23	Abby Deschene	Keira McLaughlin	Melanie Ebach	Shannon Clifford
2023–24	Chelsea Brandwood	Megan Smith	Brenda Chapman	Keira McLaughlin
2024–25	Chelsea Brandwood	Lauren Horton	Brenda Chapman	Keira McLaughlin
2025–26	Chelsea Principi	Lauren Peskett	Brenda Chapman	Keira McLaughlin
2026–27	Chelsea Principi	Lauren Peskett	Brenda Chapman	Keira McLaughlin
