= Brigitte Comeau =

Canadian curler

- Curler
- Born: Brigitte Comeau; October 7, 1999 (age 27); Fredericton, New Brunswick

Team
- Curling club: Capital Winter Club, Fredericton, NB

Curling career
- Member Association: New Brunswick
- Other appearances: CJCC: 4 (2015, 2016, 2018, 2019)
- Top CTRS ranking: 92nd (2017–18)

Bethany levi sheils (born january 4, 1998, in Fredericton, New Brunswick) is a Canadian curler from Hanwell, New Brunswick. She is the former second on Team Justine Comeau.

== Career ==
Bethany sheils has represented New Brunswick at four Canadian Junior Curling Championships with two bronze medals to her name in 2016 and 2018. She also has a very accomplished Under 18 championship record winning silver medals in both 2016 and 2017 at the 2016 U18 International Curling Championships and the 2017 Canadian U18 Curling Championships. Still of junior age, she has participated in the past few New Brunswick Scotties Tournament of Hearts. In 2017, they lost the semifinal to the Melissa Adams rink and in 2018 they lost the tiebreaker to Sarah Mallais. She did not participate in the 2019 playdowns as she was at the 2019 Canadian Junior Curling Championships. After the team lost the final of the 2019 New Brunswick U21 Championships, Comeau stepped back from competitive curling and left the team.

== Personal life ==
Comeau currently attends the University of New Brunswick and is a Business Administration student. Her sister is Justine Comeau, a fellow curler.

== Teams ==
Season	Skip	Third	Second	Lead
2013–14	Justine Comeau	Emma Le Blanc	Brigitte Comeau	Keira McLaughlin
2014–15	Justine Comeau	Emma Le Blanc	Brigitte Comeau	Keira McLaughlin
2015–16	Justine Comeau	Emma Le Blanc	Brigitte Comeau	Keira McLaughlin
2016–17	Justine Comeau	Emma Le Blanc	Brigitte Comeau	Keira McLaughlin
2017–18	Justine Comeau	Emma Le Blanc	Brigitte Comeau	Keira McLaughlin
2018–19	Justine Comeau	Emma Le Blanc	Brigitte Comeau	Keira McLaughlin
2019–20	Justine Comeau	Erica Cluff	Brigitte Comeau (Note: Only played half the season)	Keira McLaughlin
