= 2016 U18 International Curling Championships =

- Host city: Edmonton, Alberta
- Arena: Saville Sports Centre; Jasper Place Curling Club
- Dates: March 31-April 3
- Men's winner: Saskatchewan
- Skip: Mitchell Dales
- Third: Dustin Mikush
- Second: Mitchell Schmidt
- Lead: Braden Fleischhacker
- Finalist: Quebec (Jesse Mullen)
- Women's winner: Manitoba
- Skip: Mackenzie Zacharias
- Third: Morgan Reimer
- Second: Emily Zacharias
- Lead: Jenessa Rutter
- Finalist: New Brunswick (Justine Comeau)

The 2016 Optimist U18 International Curling Championships were held from March 31 to April 3 at the Saville Sports Centre and Jasper Place Curling Club in Edmonton, Alberta.

== Men ==
=== Round-robin standings ===
Final round-robin standings

Key
Teams to Knockout Round

Pool A	Skip	W	L
Saskatchewan	Mitchell Dales	5	0
British Columbia	Matthew McCrady	4	1
Ontario	Tanner Horgan	3	2
Minnesota	Riley Fenson	2	3
Japan	Taisei Kanai	1	4
New Brunswick	Liam Marin	0	5

Pool B	Skip	W	L
Quebec	Jesse Mullen	4	1
Manitoba	Brett Walter	3	2
Alberta	Ryan Jacques	3	2
Massachusetts	Chase Sinnett	3	2
Wisconsin	Michael Elwing	2	3
Northwest Territories	Adam Naugler	0	5

=== Playoffs ===
Semifinal
1	Saskatchewan	6
4	Manitoba	5
2	Quebec	6
3	British Columbia	3

Final
1	Saskatchewan	7
2	Quebec	6

Bronze Medal Game
3	British Columbia	8
4	Manitoba	6

==== Semifinal ====
Team	1	2	3	4	5	6	7	8	Final
Saskatchewan (Dales)	0	0	1	0	3	0	0	2	6
Manitoba (Walter)	0	2	0	1	0	2	0	0	5

Team	1	2	3	4	5	6	7	8	Final
Quebec (Mullen)	0	2	1	0	1	2	0	X	6
British Columbia (McCrady)	1	0	0	1	0	0	1	X	3

==== Bronze medal game ====
Team	1	2	3	4	5	6	7	8	9	Final
British Columbia (McCrady)	3	0	1	0	1	0	1	0	2	8
Manitoba (Walter)	0	1	0	1	0	3	0	1	0	6

==== Final ====
Team	1	2	3	4	5	6	7	8	9	Final
Saskatchewan (Dales)	1	0	0	0	4	1	0	0	1	7
Quebec (Mullen)	0	1	0	2	0	0	1	2	0	6

== Women ==
=== Round-robin standings ===
Final round-robin standings

Key
Teams to Knockout Round

Pool A	Skip	W	L
New Brunswick	Justine Comeau	5	0
Japan	Ayano Tsuchiya	3	2
Alberta	Kayla Skrlik	3	2
Saskatchewan	Rachel Erickson	3	2
Northwest Territories	Annie Thomas	1	4
Michigan	Maya Willertz	0	5

Pool B	Skip	W	L
Manitoba	Mackenzie Zacharias	5	0
Minnesota	Christine McMakin	3	2
Alaska	Cora Farrell	2	3
Ontario	Kira Brunton	2	3
Quebec	Emilia Gagne	2	3
British Columbia	Heather Drexel	1	4

=== Playoffs ===
Semifinal
1	Manitoba	5
4	Japan	1
2	New Brunswick	6
3	Minnesota	5

Final
1	Manitoba	3
2	New Brunswick	2

Bronze Medal Game
3	Minnesota	4
4	Japan	9

==== Semifinal ====
Team	1	2	3	4	5	6	7	8	Final
Manitoba (Zacharias)	0	1	0	0	0	2	2	X	5
Japan (Tsuchiya)	0	0	0	0	1	0	0	X	1

Team	1	2	3	4	5	6	7	8	9	Final
New Brunswick (Comeau)	2	0	2	0	0	0	0	1	1	6
Minnesota (McMakin)	0	0	0	3	1	0	1	0	0	5

==== Bronze medal game ====
Team	1	2	3	4	5	6	7	8	Final
Minnesota (McMakin)	3	0	0	0	1	0	X	X	4
Japan (Tsuchiya)	0	3	0	1	0	5	X	X	9

==== Final ====
Team	1	2	3	4	5	6	7	8	Final
Manitoba (Zacharias)	0	1	0	1	0	1	0	X	3
New Brunswick (Comeau)	0	0	0	0	0	0	2	X	2
