= Justine Comeau =

Canadian curler

- Curler
- Born: Justine Comeau; July 28, 1998 (age 28); Fredericton, New Brunswick

Team
- Curling club: Capital Winter Club, Fredericton, NB
- Skip: Justine Comeau
- Third: Carly Smith
- Second: Samantha Crook
- Lead: Meghan Beland
- Alternate: Kate Callaghan

Curling career
- Member Association: New Brunswick
- Other appearances: CJCC: 4 (2015, 2016, 2018, 2019)
- Top CTRS ranking: 72nd (2019–20)

Justine Comeau (born July 28, 1998) is a Canadian curler from Fredericton, New Brunswick. She currently skips her own team.

== Career ==
Comeau has represented New Brunswick at four Canadian Junior Curling Championships, winning two bronze medals to her name in 2016 and 2018. She also has a very accomplished Under 18 championship record, having won silver medals in both 2016 and 2017 at the 2016 U18 International Curling Championships and the 2017 Canadian U18 Curling Championships. Still of junior age, she has participated in the past few New Brunswick Scotties Tournament of Hearts. In 2017, she lost the semifinal to the Melissa Adams rink and in 2018 she lost the tiebreaker to Sarah Mallais. She did not participate in the 2019 playdowns as she was at the 2019 Canadian Junior Curling Championships. The Comeau rink would lose another semifinal at the 2020 provincials, this time to the Sylvie Quillian rink. Later that season, Comeau skipped the UNB Reds at the 2020 U Sports/Curling Canada University Curling Championships. There, the team made it all the way to the final where they lost to the Alberta Pandas skipped by Selena Sturmay.

Comeau aged out of juniors the next season and joined a new team skipped by Melissa Adams with Jaclyn Tingley at second and Kendra Lister at lead. Due to the COVID-19 pandemic in New Brunswick, the 2021 provincial championship was cancelled. As the reigning provincial champions, Team Andrea Crawford was given the invitation to represent New Brunswick at the 2021 Scotties Tournament of Hearts, but they declined due to work and family commitments. Team Adams was then invited in their place, which they accepted. Comeau, however, could not attend the event due to being a student, leaving Nicole Arsenault Bishop to take her place. At the Hearts, Team Adams finished with a 3–5 round robin record, failing to qualify for the championship round.

== Personal life ==
Comeau currently attends the University of New Brunswick and is a Business Administration student. Her sister is Brigitte Comeau.

== Teams ==
Season	Skip	Third	Second	Lead	Alternate
2013–14	Justine Comeau	Emma Le Blanc	Brigitte Comeau	Keira McLaughlin	
2014–15	Justine Comeau	Emma Le Blanc	Brigitte Comeau	Keira McLaughlin	
2015–16	Justine Comeau	Emma Le Blanc	Brigitte Comeau	Keira McLaughlin	
2016–17	Justine Comeau	Emma Le Blanc	Brigitte Comeau	Keira McLaughlin	
2017–18	Justine Comeau	Emma Le Blanc	Brigitte Comeau	Keira McLaughlin	
2018–19	Justine Comeau	Emma Le Blanc	Brigitte Comeau	Keira McLaughlin	
2019–20	Justine Comeau	Erica Cluff	Brigitte Comeau; Leah Thompson (Note: Leah Thompson replaced Brigitte Comeau halfway through the season as Comeau stepped back from competitive curling.)	Keira McLaughlin	
2020–21	Melissa Adams	Justine Comeau	Jaclyn Tingley	Kendra Lister	Nicole Arsenault-Bishop
2023–24	Carly Smith	Justine Comeau	Shaelyn Park	Meghan Beland	Jillian Crandall
2024–25	Justine Comeau	Carly Smith	Samantha Crook	Meghan Beland	Kate Callaghan
