= Sarah Mallais =

Canadian curler

- Curler
- Born: Sarah Berthelot; January 11, 1989 (age 37); Saint John, New Brunswick

Team
- Curling club: Curl Moncton, Moncton, NB
- Skip: Sarah Mallais
- Third: Jocelyn Adams-Moss
- Second: Amanda England
- Lead: Heather MacPhee

Curling career
- Member Association: New Brunswick (2005–2020; 2023–present); Nova Scotia (2021–2022)
- Top CTRS ranking: 53rd (2023–24)

Sarah Mallais (born January 11, 1989, as Sarah Berthelot) is a Canadian curler from Moncton, New Brunswick. She currently skips her own team.

== Career ==
In her junior years, Mallais represented New Brunswick at the 2007 Canada Games. The team narrowly missed the playoffs, finishing with a 3–2 record. She also represented NB at the 2006 Canadian Junior Curling Championships where the team went 5–6.

Mallais lost the final of the 2009 provincial championship as second for Mary Jane McGuire. She played in the 2010 Sobeys Slam as lead for the Melissa Adams rink. They won no games and finished 0–3 in the triple knockout. Skipping her own team in 2016, she lost in the semifinal of the 2016 New Brunswick Scotties Tournament of Hearts to former teammate Adams. The following year in 2017, Team Mallais finished the round robin in first place, directly advancing them to the final. However, Mallais would once again come up short to Adams in a 9–6 decision. Mallais would also lose the final of the 2018 and 2019 provincial championships as well, to Sylvie Quillian and Andrea Crawford respectively. In 2020, she failed to make the playoffs at the 2020 New Brunswick Scotties Tournament of Hearts after a 2–3 round robin record.

Mallais joined the Marlee Powers rink out of Nova Scotia halfway through the 2021–22 season as one of Powers' members Emily Dwyer was travelling for work with the World Curling Federation. At the 2022 Nova Scotia Scotties Tournament of Hearts, the team failed to advance to the playoffs, finishing 1–3 through the triple knockout qualifying round.

After taking a season off, Mallais joined forces with longtime rival Sylvie Quillian for the 2023–24 season. Mallais threw third rocks and skipped the team, with Quillian throwing fourth, Carol Webb playing second and Jane Boyle at lead.

== Personal life ==
Mallais is married to fellow curler Jeremy Mallais and they have three children, Zayn, Roen and Jude. She works as an Informatics Coordinator at Perinatal New Brunswick.

== Teams ==
Season	Skip	Third	Second	Lead	Alternate
2005–06	Mary Jane McGuire	Megan McGuire	Ashley Howard	Sarah Berthelot	
2008–09	Mary Jane McGuire	Megan McGuire	Sarah Berthelot	Jocelyn Adams	
2010–11	Melissa Adams	Sandy Comeau	Stacey Leger	Sarah Berthelot	
2012–13	Stacey McCormack Lacey	Sarah Bethelot	Leah Thompson	Micheala Downey	Kim Dow
2013–14	Sarah Mallais	Leah Thompson	Michaela Downey	Kim Dow	
2014–15	Sarah Mallais	Leah Thompson	Kaitlyn Veitch	Jade Carruthers	
2015–16	Sarah Mallais	Stacey McCormack Lacey	Carol Whitaker	Leah Thompson	
2016–17	Sarah Mallais	Carol Whitaker	Leah Thompson	Jane Boyle	
2017–18	Sarah Mallais	Carol Whitaker	Leah Thompson	Jane Boyle	
2018–19	Sarah Mallais	Carol Whitaker	Leah Thompson	Jane Boyle	Shannon Tatlock
2019–20	Sarah Mallais	Cathlia Ward	Jodie deSolla	Jane Boyle	
2021–22	Marlee Powers	Sarah Mallais	Jocelyn Adams	Amanda Simpson	
2023–24	Sylvie Quillian (Fourth)	Sarah Mallais (Skip)	Carol Webb	Jane Boyle	
2024–25	Sarah Mallais	Jocelyn Adams-Moss	Amanda England	Heather MacPhee	
