= 2011 New Brunswick Scotties Tournament of Hearts =

Canadian curling tournament

- Host city: Moncton, New Brunswick
- Arena: Curling Beauséjour Inc.
- Dates: January 26–30
- Winner: Team Kelly
- Curling club: Gage Golf and Curling Club
- Skip: Andrea Kelly
- Third: Denise Nowlan
- Second: Jillian Babin
- Lead: Lianne Sobey
- Finalist: Sylvie Robichaud

The 2011 New Brunswick Scotties Tournament of Hearts was held January 26–30 at the Curling Beauséjour Inc. in Moncton, New Brunswick. The winning team of Andrea Kelly represented New Brunswick at the 2011 Scotties Tournament of Hearts in Charlottetown, Prince Edward Island, where they finished round robin play with a record of 3-8.

== Teams ==
Skip	Vice	Second	Lead	Club
Melissa Adams	Sandy Comeau	Stacey Leger	Sarah Berthelot	Capital Winter Club, Fredericton
Rebecca Atkinson	Jeanette Murphy	Carol Whitaker	Jane Boyle	Thistle St. Andrews Curling Club, Saint John
Ashley Howard	Jaclyn Crandall	Shannon Williams	Pam Nicol	Capital Winter Club, Fredericton
Andrea Kelly	Denise Nowlan	Jillian Babin	Lianne Sobey	Gage Golf and Curling Club, Oromocto
Sharon Levesque	Debbie Dickeson	Anna Brinson	Jan McCormack	Capital Winter Club, Fredericton
Mary Jane McGuire	Megan McGuire	Nicole McCann	Alice MacKay	Capital Winter Club, Fredericton
Sylvie Robichaud	Danielle Nicholson	Marie Richard	Kendra Lister	Curling Beauséjour Inc., Moncton
Kathleen Trites	Lisa Freeman	Beverley Janes Colpitts	Christina Moore	Sackville Curling Club, Sackville

== Standings ==
Skip (Club)	W	L	PF	PA	Ends Won	Ends Lost	Blank Ends	Stolen Ends
Andrea Kelly (Gage Golf and Curling Club)	7	0	57	28	33	20	9	12
Sylvie Robichaud (Curling Beauséjour Inc.)	6	1	50	31	30	26	7	5
Rebecca Atkinson (Thistle St. Andrews C.C)	5	2	44	31	28	27	9	4
Mary Jane McGuire (Capital Winter Club)	4	3	45	32	28	23	9	9
Melissa Adams (Capital Winter Club)	3	4	37	42	30	25	3	13
Ashley Howard (Capital Winter Club	2	5	37	43	25	32	9	6
Sharon Levesque (Capital Winter Club)	1	6	34	54	25	31	5	6
Kathleen Trites (Sackville Curling Club)	0	7	18	61	16	31	9	1

== Results ==
=== Draw 1 ===
January 26 7:00 PM

Sheet 6	1	2	3	4	5	6	7	8	9	10	11	Final
McGuire 🔨	2	0	0	1	0	0	0	0	1	1	0	5
Atkinson	0	0	2	0	1	1	1	0	0	0	3	8

Sheet 7	1	2	3	4	5	6	7	8	9	10	Final
Levesque 🔨	1	0	0	0	1	2	0	1	2	X	7
Trites	0	0	0	1	0	0	1	0	0	X	2

Sheet 8	1	2	3	4	5	6	7	8	9	10	Final
Robichaud 🔨	0	0	0	2	1	0	1	0	0	0	4
Kelly	0	0	1	0	0	2	0	2	0	1	6

Sheet 9	1	2	3	4	5	6	7	8	9	10	Final
Adams 🔨	2	0	1	1	0	1	0	0	2	X	7
Howard	0	0	0	0	1	0	1	2	0	X	4

=== Draw 2 ===
January 27 9:00 AM

Sheet 6	1	2	3	4	5	6	7	8	9	10	11	Final
Howard 🔨	0	0	2	0	1	0	1	0	1	1	0	6
Robichaud	0	2	0	1	0	2	0	1	0	0	1	7

Sheet 7	1	2	3	4	5	6	7	8	9	10	Final
Kelly 🔨	3	0	0	1	1	0	2	0	0	X	7
Adams	0	0	3	0	0	1	0	1	1	X	6

Sheet 8	1	2	3	4	5	6	7	8	9	10	Final
Trites	0	0	0	0	2	0	1	0	X	X	3
McGuire 🔨	2	0	2	0	0	2	0	4	X	X	10

Sheet 9	1	2	3	4	5	6	7	8	9	10	Final
Atkinson 🔨	4	0	1	2	0	0	2	X	X	X	9
Levesque	0	1	0	0	1	1	0	X	X	X	3

=== Draw 3 ===
January 27 2:00 PM

Sheet 6	1	2	3	4	5	6	7	8	9	10	Final
Adams	1	2	2	2	2	1	X	X	X	X	10
Trites 🔨	0	0	0	0	0	0	X	X	X	X	0

Sheet 7	1	2	3	4	5	6	7	8	9	10	Final
Robichaud 🔨	0	1	0	0	1	0	2	0	1	X	5
Atkinson	0	0	0	1	0	1	0	1	0	X	3

Sheet 8	1	2	3	4	5	6	7	8	9	10	Final
Levesque	0	1	0	0	1	0	1	1	0	X	4
Howard 🔨	1	0	1	2	0	2	0	0	1	X	7

Sheet 9	1	2	3	4	5	6	7	8	9	10	Final
McGuire	0	0	1	0	0	0	0	1	X	X	2
Kelly 🔨	0	2	0	1	2	1	1	0	X	X	7

=== Draw 4 ===
January 27 7:00 PM

Sheet 6	1	2	3	4	5	6	7	8	9	10	Final
Kelly 🔨	2	0	0	1	0	3	3	0	X	X	9
Levesque	0	1	0	0	3	0	0	1	X	X	5

Sheet 7	1	2	3	4	5	6	7	8	9	10	Final
Howard	0	2	0	0	0	0	1	X	X	X	3
McGuire 🔨	2	0	0	2	2	1	0	X	X	X	7

Sheet 8	1	2	3	4	5	6	7	8	9	10	Final
Adams	0	1	1	0	1	0	0	1	0	X	4
Atkinson 🔨	1	0	0	2	0	2	1	0	2	X	8

Sheet 9	1	2	3	4	5	6	7	8	9	10	Final
Robichaud 🔨	2	2	0	2	0	0	2	0	X	X	8
Trites	0	0	1	0	0	1	0	1	X	X	3

=== Draw 5 ===
January 28 2:00 PM

Sheet 6	1	2	3	4	5	6	7	8	9	10	Final
Atkinson 🔨	0	0	2	0	0	2	0	0	0	1	5
Howard	0	1	0	0	1	0	1	1	0	0	4

Sheet 7	1	2	3	4	5	6	7	8	9	10	Final
Levesque	0	1	0	2	0	1	0	1	0	X	5
Robichaud 🔨	2	0	2	0	2	0	2	0	3	X	11

Sheet 8	1	2	3	4	5	6	7	8	9	10	Final
Trites	0	0	1	0	0	0	2	0	X	X	3
Kelly 🔨	2	2	0	2	0	1	0	4	X	X	11

Sheet 9	1	2	3	4	5	6	7	8	9	10	Final
McGuire 🔨	0	1	0	0	3	1	1	2	X	X	8
Adams	1	0	1	0	0	0	0	0	X	X	2

=== Draw 6 ===
January 28 7:00 PM

Sheet 6	1	2	3	4	5	6	7	8	9	10	Final
Robichaud	0	2	0	2	0	1	0	0	1	1	7
McGuire 🔨	1	0	1	0	1	0	1	1	0	0	5

Sheet 7	1	2	3	4	5	6	7	8	9	10	Final
Trites 🔨	0	0	1	0	1	0	1	0	0	1	4
Howard	0	0	0	1	0	1	0	2	3	0	7

Sheet 8	1	2	3	4	5	6	7	8	9	10	11	Final
Levesque 🔨	0	2	0	0	0	1	1	3	0	0	0	7
Adams	1	0	1	1	2	0	0	0	1	1	1	8

Sheet 9	1	2	3	4	5	6	7	8	9	10	Final
Kelly 🔨	1	0	0	1	1	0	3	1	0	X	7
Atkinson	0	0	1	0	0	1	0	0	1	X	3

=== Draw 7 ===
January 29 9:00 AM

Sheet 6	1	2	3	4	5	6	7	8	9	10	Final
Howard 🔨	2	0	0	0	2	0	1	0	0	0	5
Kelly	0	0	2	3	0	1	0	2	1	1	10

Sheet 7	1	2	3	4	5	6	7	8	9	10	Final
McGuire 🔨	0	2	0	3	0	0	2	1	X	X	8
Levesque	0	0	2	0	1	0	0	0	X	X	3

Sheet 8	1	2	3	4	5	6	7	8	9	10	Final
Atkinson 🔨	0	0	1	0	2	0	5	X	X	X	8
Trites	0	1	0	1	0	1	0	X	X	X	3

Sheet 9	1	2	3	4	5	6	7	8	9	10	Final
Adams	0	2	0	0	0	1	X	X	X	X	3
Robichaud 🔨	1	0	2	4	1	0	X	X	X	X	8

== Playoffs ==
Semifinal			Final
			1	Andrea Kelly	7
2	Sylvie Robichaud	6	2	Sylvie Robichaud	2
3	Rebecca Atkinson	4

=== Semifinal ===
January 29, 8:00 PM

Sheet 6	1	2	3	4	5	6	7	8	9	10	Final
Robichaud 🔨	0	0	1	0	2	0	0	1	2	X	6
Atkinson	0	0	0	2	0	1	1	0	0	X	4

=== Final ===
January 30, 2:30 PM

Sheet 6	1	2	3	4	5	6	7	8	9	10	Final
Kelly	0	2	0	2	1	1	0	1	X	X	7
Robichaud	0	0	1	0	0	0	1	0	X	X	2

== Qualification round ==
The qualification round for the 2011 New Brunswick Tournament of Hearts will take place December 17–19, 2010 at the Carleton Curling Club in Saint John, New Brunswick. The format of play shall be an open-entry double knockout qualifying eight teams to the Provincial playoffs at the Curling Beauséjour Inc. in Moncton, New Brunswick, January 26–30, 2011.

=== Teams ===
Skip	Vice	Second	Lead	Club
Melissa Adams	Sandy Comeau	Stacey Leger	Sarah Berthelot	Capital Winter Club, Fredericton
Rebecca Atkinson	Jeanette Murphy	Carol Whitaker	Jane Boyle	Thistle St. Andrews Curling Club, Saint John, New Brunswick
Ashley Howard	Jaclyn Crandall	Shannon Williams	Pam Nicol	Capital Winter Club, Fredericton
Susan Jonah	Connie Bothwell	Eleanor Murray	Debbie MacLoon-Agnew	Capital Winter Club, Fredericton
Andrea Kelly	Denise Nowlan	Jillian Babin	Lianne Sobey	Gage Golf and Curling Club, Oromocto, New Brunswick
Sharon Levesque	Debbie Dickeson	Anna Brinson	Jan McCormack	Capital Winter Club, Fredericton
Mary Jane McGuire	Megan McGuire	Nicole McCann	Alice MacKay	Capital Winter Club, Fredericton
Marin McLeod	Britanni Jeans	Leah Thompson	Victoria Daley	Gage Golf and Curling Club, Oromocto, New Brunswick
Sylvie Robichaud	Danielle Nicholson	Marie Richard	Kendra Lister	Curling Beauséjour Inc., Moncton
Kathleen Trites	Lisa Freeman	Beverely Ann Colpits	Christina Moore	Sackville Curling Club, Sackville, New Brunswick

=== Qualifier A ===
A Qualifier			Finals
			A5	McLeod	2
A1	Jonah	5	A1	Adams	10
A1	Adams	8

B Qualifier			Finals
			A6	Robichaud	6
A2	Kelly	4	A2	Kelly	5
A2	Atkinson	3

Quarterfinals	Semifinals			C Qualifier
	A3	Howard	2
	A3	Lesvesque	10
				A3	Lesvesque	6
				A4	McGuire	7
	A4	McGuire	12
	A4	Trites	10

=== Qualifier B ===
D Qualifier			Finals
			A7	Lesvesque	7
A1	Jonah	2	A8	Atkinson	1
A2	Atkinson	4

E Qualifier
A3	Howard	10
A4	Trites	7

F Qualifier
A5	McLeod	3
A6	Kelly	10

G Qualifier
A8	Jonah	8
A9	Trites	14

H Qualifier
A10	Atkinson	10
A11	McLeod	8
