= 2005 Canadian Junior Curling Championships =

The 2005 Kärcher Canadian Junior Curling Championships were held February 5–13 at the Capital Winter Club and the Lady Beaverbrook Rink in Fredericton, New Brunswick. The winning teams represented Canada at the 2005 World Junior Curling Championships.

== Men's ==
=== Teams ===
Province / Territory	Skip	Third	Second	Lead
Alberta	Derek Miller	Dustin Eckstrand	Matt Enright	Lance Palamaruk
British Columbia	Ty Griffith	Russ Koffski	Jamie Danbrook	Todd Jensen
Manitoba	Daley Peters	Brendan Neufeld	Doug Hamblin	Marc Lacroix
New Brunswick	Ryan Sherrard	Jason Roach	Darren Roach	Jared Bezanson
Newfoundland and Labrador	Matthew Blandford	Trent Skanes	Paul Steeves	Andrew Mercer
Northern Ontario	Brad Jacobs	Brady Barnett	Scott Seabrook	Steve Molodowich
Northwest Territories	Trevor Moss	Chris Kelln	Robert Borden	Allan Borden
Nova Scotia	Ian Fitzner-LeBlanc	Chris McDonah	Bill MacPhee	Kendall Keeley
Ontario	Mark Bice	Codey Maus	Rob Pruliere	Jeff Wilson
Prince Edward Island	Steven Howard	Tyler MacKenzie	Peter Girvan	Jeremy Cameron
Quebec	Martin Crete	Jonathan Tremblay	Gregory Cantin	Olivier Leclerc
Saskatchewan	Kyle George	Justin Mihalicz	DJ Kidby	Chris Hebert
Yukon	Trevor Prosko	Alexx Peech	Steven Boyd	Cole Hume

=== Standings ===
Locale	Skip	W	L
Saskatchewan	Kyle George	10	2
Ontario	Mark Bice	9	3
Nova Scotia	Ian Fitzner-LeBlanc	9	3
Northern Ontario	Brad Jacobs	8	4
Newfoundland and Labrador	Matthew Blandford	8	4
Quebec	Martin Crete	8	4
Prince Edward Island	Steven Howard	6	6
Manitoba	Daley Peters	6	6
New Brunswick	Ryan Sherrard	5	7
British Columbia	Ty Griffith	4	8
Alberta	Derek Miller	4	8
Yukon	Trevor Prosko	1	11
Northwest Territories	Trevor Moss	0	12

=== Results ===
==== Draw 1 ====
Sheet A	1	2	3	4	5	6	7	8	9	10	Final
Alberta (Miller) 🔨	2	0	0	2	0	0	3	0	0	1	8
New Brunswick (Sherrard)	0	1	2	0	0	1	0	3	0	0	7

Sheet E	1	2	3	4	5	6	7	8	9	10	Final
Newfoundland and Labrador (Blandford) 🔨	1	1	1	1	0	0	0	1	4	X	9
Prince Edward Island (Howard)	0	0	0	0	2	1	1	0	0	X	4

Sheet G	1	2	3	4	5	6	7	8	9	10	Final
Ontario (Bice) 🔨	0	0	0	1	0	0	0	1	X	X	2
Saskatchewan (George)	1	1	1	0	2	0	2	0	X	X	7

Sheet I	1	2	3	4	5	6	7	8	9	10	Final
Nova Scotia (Fitzner-LeBlanc) 🔨	1	0	0	1	0	6	0	1	0	X	9
British Columbia (Griffith)	0	0	1	0	1	0	1	0	1	X	4

==== Draw 2 ====
Sheet A	1	2	3	4	5	6	7	8	9	10	Final
Yukon (Prosko) 🔨	1	0	1	0	1	0	0	2	X	X	5
Quebec (Crete)	0	3	0	2	0	2	3	0	X	X	10

Sheet C	1	2	3	4	5	6	7	8	9	10	Final
Manitoba (Peters) 🔨	3	0	1	0	3	5	X	X	X	X	12
Alberta (Miller)	0	1	0	2	0	0	X	X	X	X	3

Sheet E	1	2	3	4	5	6	7	8	9	10	Final
Northern Ontario (Jacobs) 🔨	1	2	0	0	1	0	0	0	0	X	4
Nova Scotia (Fitzner-LeBlanc)	0	0	0	2	0	1	1	1	2	X	7

Sheet I	1	2	3	4	5	6	7	8	9	10	Final
Northwest Territories (Moss) 🔨	0	1	0	1	0	1	0	X	X	X	3
Ontario (Bice)	2	0	1	0	3	0	3	X	X	X	9

==== Draw 3 ====
Sheet B	1	2	3	4	5	6	7	8	9	10	Final
British Columbia (Griffith) 🔨	1	0	0	0	0	0	1	0	1	X	3
Newfoundland and Labrador (Blandford)	0	1	1	1	0	0	0	2	0	X	5

Sheet D	1	2	3	4	5	6	7	8	9	10	Final
New Brunswick (Sherrard) 🔨	0	3	1	0	1	1	1	0	0	X	7
Northwest Territories (Moss)	0	0	0	2	0	0	0	2	1	X	5

Sheet F	1	2	3	4	5	6	7	8	9	10	Final
Quebec (Crete) 🔨	2	1	0	0	1	0	1	0	1	0	6
Manitoba (Peters)	0	0	0	2	0	2	0	1	0	2	7

Sheet H	1	2	3	4	5	6	7	8	9	10	Final
Prince Edward Island (Howard) 🔨	1	3	0	1	0	2	0	X	X	X	7
Yukon (Prosko)	0	0	0	0	1	0	1	X	X	X	2

Sheet J	1	2	3	4	5	6	7	8	9	10	Final
Saskatchewan (George) 🔨	1	0	0	0	2	0	2	0	0	1	6
Northern Ontario (Jacobs)	0	1	0	1	0	1	0	1	1	0	5

==== Draw 4 ====
Sheet A	1	2	3	4	5	6	7	8	9	10	Final
Nova Scotia (Fitzner-LeBlanc) 🔨	2	0	2	0	2	0	2	2	X	X	10
Newfoundland and Labrador (Blandford)	0	1	0	2	0	1	0	0	X	X	4

Sheet C	1	2	3	4	5	6	7	8	9	10	Final
Prince Edward Island (Howard) 🔨	1	0	2	0	0	0	0	0	0	X	3
Quebec (Crete)	0	0	0	1	0	2	2	1	1	X	7

Sheet E	1	2	3	4	5	6	7	8	9	10	Final
New Brunswick (Sherrard) 🔨	1	3	2	0	1	1	0	0	1	X	9
Ontario (Bice)	0	0	0	2	0	0	2	1	0	X	5

Sheet H	1	2	3	4	5	6	7	8	9	10	Final
Northwest Territories (Moss) 🔨	1	0	0	0	0	2	0	0	0	X	3
Saskatchewan (George)	0	1	0	1	1	0	2	0	2	X	7

Sheet J	1	2	3	4	5	6	7	8	9	10	Final
Yukon (Prosko) 🔨	0	2	0	0	0	0	0	2	0	X	4
Manitoba (Peters)	0	0	0	3	0	2	2	0	2	X	9

==== Draw 5 ====
Sheet D	1	2	3	4	5	6	7	8	9	10	Final
Northern Ontario (Jacobs) 🔨	2	0	1	0	2	0	2	0	2	X	9
British Columbia (Griffith)	0	1	0	2	0	1	0	2	0	X	6

Sheet G	1	2	3	4	5	6	7	8	9	10	Final
Saskatchewan (George) 🔨	0	1	0	4	1	2	X	X	X	X	8
Nova Scotia (Fitzner-LeBlanc)	0	0	1	0	0	0	X	X	X	X	1

Sheet I	1	2	3	4	5	6	7	8	9	10	Final
Quebec (Crete) 🔨	0	0	2	0	2	1	0	0	3	X	8
Alberta (Miller)	2	0	0	1	0	0	0	2	0	X	5

==== Draw 6 ====
Sheet B	1	2	3	4	5	6	7	8	9	10	Final
Alberta (Miller) 🔨	2	1	2	0	3	1	X	X	X	X	9
Northwest Territories (Moss)	0	0	0	1	0	0	X	X	X	X	1

Sheet C	1	2	3	4	5	6	7	8	9	10	Final
Newfoundland and Labrador (Blandford) 🔨	2	0	1	1	0	2	0	0	0	2	8
Yukon (Prosko)	0	1	0	0	3	0	0	0	1	0	5

Sheet F	1	2	3	4	5	6	7	8	9	10	Final
British Columbia (Griffith) 🔨	0	0	1	0	1	0	1	0	0	X	3
Prince Edward Island (Howard)	1	1	0	1	0	1	0	2	2	X	8

Sheet H	1	2	3	4	5	6	7	8	9	10	Final
Manitoba (Peters) 🔨	0	0	1	1	0	3	1	0	2	X	8
New Brunswick (Sherrard)	0	1	0	0	2	0	0	1	0	X	4

Sheet I	1	2	3	4	5	6	7	8	9	10	Final
Ontario (Bice) 🔨	4	0	1	0	2	0	0	2	1	X	10
Northern Ontario (Jacobs)	0	1	0	2	0	1	1	0	0	X	5

==== Draw 7 ====
Sheet B	1	2	3	4	5	6	7	8	9	10	Final
Ontario (Bice) 🔨	0	1	0	2	0	3	0	0	0	1	7
Nova Scotia (Fitzner-LeBlanc)	0	0	1	0	1	0	0	3	0	0	5

Sheet D	1	2	3	4	5	6	7	8	9	10	Final
Yukon (Prosko) 🔨	0	0	1	0	1	1	1	0	1	X	5
Alberta (Miller)	1	1	0	1	0	0	0	4	0	X	7

Sheet E	1	2	3	4	5	6	7	8	9	10	Final
Manitoba (Peters) 🔨	0	1	0	2	0	2	1	0	2	X	8
Northwest Territories (Moss)	2	0	1	0	2	0	0	1	0	X	6

Sheet G	1	2	3	4	5	6	7	8	9	10	Final
Northern Ontario (Jacobs) 🔨	0	3	0	1	1	0	1	0	0	1	7
Newfoundland and Labrador (Blandford)	0	0	1	0	0	2	0	2	0	0	5

==== Draw 8 ====
Sheet C	1	2	3	4	5	6	7	8	9	10	11	Final
New Brunswick (Sherrard) 🔨	0	2	0	0	0	2	0	0	1	0	0	5
Saskatchewan (George)	0	0	0	1	0	0	1	1	0	2	1	6

Sheet E	1	2	3	4	5	6	7	8	9	10	Final
British Columbia (Griffith) 🔨	2	0	2	0	1	0	1	0	5	X	11
Yukon (Prosko)	0	1	0	1	0	1	0	1	0	X	4

Sheet H	1	2	3	4	5	6	7	8	9	10	Final
Nova Scotia (Fitzner-LeBlanc) 🔨	1	1	0	2	0	2	1	0	0	X	7
Prince Edward Island (Howard)	0	0	1	0	2	0	0	1	1	X	5

Sheet J	1	2	3	4	5	6	7	8	9	10	Final
Newfoundland and Labrador (Blandford) 🔨	3	0	1	2	0	0	1	0	2	X	9
Quebec (Crete)	0	1	0	0	0	1	0	3	0	X	5

==== Draw 9 ====
Sheet A	1	2	3	4	5	6	7	8	9	10	Final
Prince Edward Island (Howard) 🔨	2	0	0	2	0	1	1	0	3	X	9
Manitoba (Peters)	0	2	0	0	1	0	0	1	0	X	4

Sheet C	1	2	3	4	5	6	7	8	9	10	Final
Northwest Territories (Moss) 🔨	1	0	0	3	0	0	0	1	0	X	5
Northern Ontario (Jacobs)	0	2	0	0	2	1	3	0	3	X	11

Sheet F	1	2	3	4	5	6	7	8	9	10	Final
Alberta (Miller) 🔨	2	0	1	0	1	0	2	1	0	0	7
Ontario (Bice)	0	1	0	1	0	3	0	0	2	1	8

Sheet G	1	2	3	4	5	6	7	8	9	10	11	Final
Quebec (Crete) 🔨	2	2	0	1	0	0	1	0	0	0	1	7
New Brunswick (Sherrard)	0	0	0	0	1	1	0	1	3	0	0	6

Sheet I	1	2	3	4	5	6	7	8	9	10	Final
Saskatchewan (George) 🔨	0	1	0	1	0	3	0	0	3	1	9
British Columbia (Griffith)	0	0	2	0	2	0	0	1	0	0	5

==== Draw 10 ====
Sheet A	1	2	3	4	5	6	7	8	9	10	11	Final
Alberta (Miller) 🔨	1	0	0	2	0	3	0	2	0	1	1	10
Saskatchewan (George)	0	2	2	0	1	0	3	0	1	0	0	9

Sheet D	1	2	3	4	5	6	7	8	9	10	Final
Newfoundland and Labrador (Blandford) 🔨	1	0	0	1	0	1	1	0	1	1	6
Manitoba (Peters)	0	2	1	0	1	0	0	1	0	0	5

Sheet H	1	2	3	4	5	6	7	8	9	10	Final
British Columbia (Griffith) 🔨	0	0	1	0	1	0	2	0	X	X	4
Quebec (Crete)	1	1	0	2	0	5	0	2	X	X	11

==== Draw 11 ====
Sheet A	1	2	3	4	5	6	7	8	9	10	Final
Quebec (Crete) 🔨	2	0	1	0	2	0	2	0	0	X	7
Northwest Territories (Moss)	0	1	0	1	0	1	0	0	1	X	4

Sheet D	1	2	3	4	5	6	7	8	9	10	Final
New Brunswick (Sherrard) 🔨	0	2	0	0	1	1	0	1	1	0	6
Northern Ontario (Jacobs)	0	0	0	2	0	0	4	0	0	1	7

Sheet F	1	2	3	4	5	6	7	8	9	10	Final
Nova Scotia (Fitzner-LeBlanc) 🔨	2	1	0	2	1	0	2	3	X	X	11
Yukon (Prosko)	0	0	2	0	0	2	0	0	X	X	4

Sheet G	1	2	3	4	5	6	7	8	9	10	Final
Prince Edward Island (Howard) 🔨	2	0	0	3	0	1	1	0	X	X	7
Alberta (Miller)	0	0	2	0	1	0	0	0	X	X	3

Sheet J	1	2	3	4	5	6	7	8	9	10	Final
Manitoba (Peters) 🔨	0	0	0	1	0	1	0	0	0	0	2
Ontario (Bice)	0	0	0	0	1	0	0	0	0	2	3

==== Draw 12 ====
Sheet B	1	2	3	4	5	6	7	8	9	10	Final
Northern Ontario (Jacobs) 🔨	0	2	0	2	3	1	X	X	X	X	8
Prince Edward Island (Howard)	0	0	1	0	0	0	X	X	X	X	1

Sheet D	1	2	3	4	5	6	7	8	9	10	Final
Northwest Territories (Moss) 🔨	0	0	1	0	1	0	0	1	0	X	3
Nova Scotia (Fitzner-LeBlanc)	1	1	0	1	0	1	2	0	2	X	8

Sheet E	1	2	3	4	5	6	7	8	9	10	Final
Ontario (Bice) 🔨	0	3	0	4	0	1	3	X	X	X	11
British Columbia (Griffith)	0	0	2	0	1	0	0	X	X	X	3

Sheet H	1	2	3	4	5	6	7	8	9	10	Final
Saskatchewan (George) 🔨	1	0	1	0	1	0	2	0	1	1	7
Newfoundland and Labrador (Blandford)	0	0	0	1	0	2	0	1	0	0	4

Sheet I	1	2	3	4	5	6	7	8	9	10	Final
Yukon (Prosko) 🔨	0	1	1	0	0	0	0	1	X	X	3
New Brunswick (Sherrard)	3	0	0	0	2	0	3	0	X	X	8

==== Draw 13 ====
Sheet B	1	2	3	4	5	6	7	8	9	10	Final
Nova Scotia (Fitzner-LeBlanc) 🔨	3	0	3	0	1	0	0	2	0	1	10
Quebec (Crete)	0	2	0	1	0	1	1	0	1	0	6

Sheet C	1	2	3	4	5	6	7	8	9	10	Final
British Columbia (Griffith) 🔨	0	1	1	1	1	0	0	1	1	2	8
Manitoba (Peters)	0	0	0	0	0	2	1	0	0	0	3

Sheet H	1	2	3	4	5	6	7	8	9	10	Final
Prince Edward Island (Howard) 🔨	3	0	1	0	1	0	2	0	1	X	8
New Brunswick (Sherrard)	0	1	0	2	0	2	0	1	0	X	6

Sheet J	1	2	3	4	5	6	7	8	9	10	Final
Northern Ontario (Jacobs) 🔨	0	0	2	3	0	2	1	0	X	X	8
Yukon (Prosko)	0	0	0	0	2	0	0	1	X	X	3

==== Draw 14 ====
Sheet A	1	2	3	4	5	6	7	8	9	10	Final
Ontario (Bice) 🔨	1	1	0	1	0	0	0	2	0	1	6
Newfoundland and Labrador (Blandford)	0	0	1	0	1	1	1	0	1	0	5

Sheet E	1	2	3	4	5	6	7	8	9	10	Final
Alberta (Miller) 🔨	2	0	1	1	0	1	0	0	2	0	7
Northern Ontario (Jacobs)	0	2	0	0	2	0	1	1	0	2	8

Sheet G	1	2	3	4	5	6	7	8	9	10	11	Final
Northwest Territories (Moss) 🔨	0	2	0	1	0	0	0	0	0	1	0	4
British Columbia (Griffith)	0	0	1	0	1	1	0	0	1	0	1	5

Sheet J	1	2	3	4	5	6	7	8	9	10	Final
Saskatchewan (George) 🔨	3	0	1	4	0	0	1	X	X	X	9
Prince Edward Island (Howard)	0	1	0	0	1	2	0	X	X	X	4

==== Draw 15 ====
Sheet B	1	2	3	4	5	6	7	8	9	10	Final
Yukon (Prosko) 🔨	1	0	2	0	2	0	2	2	0	X	9
Northwest Territories (Moss)	0	1	0	0	0	3	0	0	2	X	6

Sheet D	1	2	3	4	5	6	7	8	9	10	11	Final
Quebec (Crete) 🔨	1	0	1	0	0	2	0	2	1	0	1	8
Ontario (Bice)	0	1	0	2	1	0	1	0	0	2	0	7

Sheet F	1	2	3	4	5	6	7	8	9	10	Final
Manitoba (Peters) 🔨	0	2	0	0	0	0	2	0	0	X	4
Saskatchewan (George)	0	0	2	1	2	1	0	2	2	X	10

Sheet G	1	2	3	4	5	6	7	8	9	10	Final
Newfoundland and Labrador (Blandford) 🔨	1	0	1	1	0	1	0	2	0	2	8
Alberta (Miller)	0	2	0	0	2	0	1	0	1	0	6

Sheet J	1	2	3	4	5	6	7	8	9	10	Final
New Brunswick (Sherrard) 🔨	1	0	1	1	0	2	1	0	0	1	7
Nova Scotia (Fitzner-LeBlanc)	0	2	0	0	2	0	0	2	0	0	6

==== Draw 16 ====
Sheet D	1	2	3	4	5	6	7	8	9	10	Final
Saskatchewan (George) 🔨	1	0	2	1	0	0	3	0	3	X	10
Yukon (Prosko)	0	3	0	0	0	1	0	1	0	X	5

Sheet F	1	2	3	4	5	6	7	8	9	10	Final
Prince Edward Island (Howard) 🔨	3	3	0	0	3	0	1	X	X	X	10
Northwest Territories (Moss)	0	0	1	1	0	1	0	X	X	X	3

Sheet H	1	2	3	4	5	6	7	8	9	10	Final
Northern Ontario (Jacobs) 🔨	0	2	0	3	0	0	2	0	1	X	8
Quebec (Crete)	0	0	1	0	0	1	0	3	0	X	5

Sheet J	1	2	3	4	5	6	7	8	9	10	11	Final
British Columbia (Griffith) 🔨	0	2	0	1	0	0	2	0	2	0	1	8
Alberta (Miller)	0	0	2	0	1	0	0	2	0	2	0	7

==== Draw 17 ====
Sheet A	1	2	3	4	5	6	7	8	9	10	Final
Manitoba (Peters) 🔨	1	0	2	1	0	0	1	1	2	X	8
Northern Ontario (Jacobs)	0	1	0	0	2	0	0	0	0	X	3

Sheet C	1	2	3	4	5	6	7	8	9	10	Final
Alberta (Miller) 🔨	1	0	0	2	0	0	2	0	X	X	5
Nova Scotia (Fitzner-LeBlanc)	0	1	3	0	2	2	0	2	X	X	10

Sheet F	1	2	3	4	5	6	7	8	9	10	11	Final
Newfoundland and Labrador (Blandford) 🔨	1	0	1	0	1	0	2	0	0	0	1	6
New Brunswick (Sherrard)	0	1	0	1	0	1	0	0	1	1	0	5

Sheet G	1	2	3	4	5	6	7	8	9	10	Final
Yukon (Prosko) 🔨	0	0	0	0	0	0	X	X	X	X	0
Ontario (Bice)	3	1	1	0	1	5	X	X	X	X	11

==== Draw 18 ====
Sheet A	1	2	3	4	5	6	7	8	9	10	Final
New Brunswick (Sherrard) 🔨	0	1	1	0	0	2	0	3	0	X	7
British Columbia (Griffith)	0	0	0	1	0	0	2	0	0	X	3

Sheet C	1	2	3	4	5	6	7	8	9	10	Final
Ontario (Bice) 🔨	3	0	0	2	0	2	0	0	0	1	8
Prince Edward Island (Howard)	0	2	1	0	1	0	0	2	1	0	7

Sheet E	1	2	3	4	5	6	7	8	9	10	Final
Quebec (Crete) 🔨	0	2	0	1	0	0	1	1	1	2	8
Saskatchewan (George)	2	0	2	0	1	1	0	0	0	0	6

Sheet G	1	2	3	4	5	6	7	8	9	10	11	12	Final
Nova Scotia (Fitzner-LeBlanc) 🔨	0	0	2	1	0	2	0	2	0	0	0	1	8
Manitoba (Peters)	0	0	0	0	2	0	1	0	2	2	0	0	7

Sheet I	1	2	3	4	5	6	7	8	9	10	Final
Northwest Territories (Moss) 🔨	0	1	0	3	0	1	0	1	1	0	7
Newfoundland and Labrador (Blandford)	0	0	2	0	1	0	3	0	0	2	8

=== Playoffs ===
Semifinal		Final
Nova Scotia	3
Ontario	7	Saskatchewan	8
		Ontario	5

==== Semifinal ====
Sheet B	1	2	3	4	5	6	7	8	9	10	Final
Nova Scotia (Fitzner-LeBlanc)	0	0	2	0	0	1	0	0	0	X	3
Ontario (Bice) 🔨	0	1	0	1	2	0	0	2	1	X	7

Player percentages
Nova Scotia		Ontario	
Kendall Keeley	64%	Jeff Wilson	71%
Bill MacPhee	79%	Rob Pruliere	81%
Chris McDonah	65%	Codey Maus	83%
Ian Fitzner-LeBlanc	40%	Mark Bice	78%
Total	62%	Total	78%

==== Final ====
Sheet C	1	2	3	4	5	6	7	8	9	10	Final
Saskatchewan (George) 🔨	1	0	1	0	1	0	2	0	3	X	8
Ontario (Bice)	0	0	0	1	0	3	0	1	0	X	5

Player percentages
Saskatchewan		Ontario	
Chris Hebert	85%	Jeff Wilson	93%
DJ Kidby	84%	Rob Pruliere	90%
Justin Mihalicz	81%	Codey Maus	79%
Kyle George	63%	Mark Bice	79%
Total	78%	Total	85%

== Women's ==
=== Teams ===
Province / Territory	Skip	Third	Second	Lead
Alberta	Desirée Robertson	Cary-Anne Sallows	Jennifer Perry	Stephanie Jordan
British Columbia	Sarah Wark	Darah-Lyn Provencal	Steph Jackson	Sarah Neal
Manitoba	Calleen Neufeld	Sabrina Neufeld	Laryssa Grenkow	Lindsay Edie
New Brunswick	Andrea Kelly	Kristen MacDiarmid	Jodie deSolla	Lianne Sobey
Newfoundland and Labrador	Stacie Devereaux	Stephanie Guzzwell	Julie Devereaux	Sarah Paul
Northern Ontario	Tracy Horgan	Amanda Gates	Jennifer Horgan (skip)	Stephanie Barbeau
Northwest Territories	Kristan Thompson	Kate Jefferson	Carina Sartor-Pielak	Leslie Merrithew
Nova Scotia	Morgan Muise	Michelle Woodroffe	Amanda Sedge	Ashlee Rushton
Ontario	Erin Morrissey	Samantha Peters	Karen Sagle	Katie Morrissey
Prince Edward Island	Meaghan Hughes	Kendra Cameron	Sinead Dolan	Michala Robison
Quebec	Marie-Christine Cantin	Anne-Marie Filteau	Amélie Blais	Julie Cantin
Saskatchewan	Robyn Silvernagle	Sasha Yole	Lindsey Barber	Tanny Yole
Yukon	Ladene Shaw	Mandi Shaw	Jessie Leschart	Tara Klippert

=== Standings ===
Locale	Skip	W	L
Alberta	Desirée Robertson	12	0
Quebec	Marie-Christine Cantin	10	2
New Brunswick	Andrea Kelly	9	3
Northern Ontario	Tracy Horgan	7	5
Saskatchewan	Robyn Silvernagle	7	5
British Columbia	Sarah Wark	6	6
Nova Scotia	Morgan Muise	6	6
Prince Edward Island	Meaghan Hughes	6	6
Newfoundland and Labrador	Stacie Devereaux	5	7
Manitoba	Calleen Neufeld	5	7
Ontario	Erin Morrissey	4	8
Northwest Territories	Kristan Thompson	1	11
Yukon	Ladene Shaw	0	12

=== Results ===
==== Draw 1 ====
Sheet B	1	2	3	4	5	6	7	8	9	10	Final
Alberta (Robertson) 🔨	1	0	1	0	3	1	0	0	0	X	6
New Brunswick (Kelly)	0	1	0	1	0	0	1	1	1	X	5

Sheet F	1	2	3	4	5	6	7	8	9	10	Final
Newfoundland and Labrador (Devereaux) 🔨	0	0	0	0	3	1	1	0	X	X	5
Prince Edward Island (Hughes)	1	3	3	2	0	0	0	3	X	X	12

Sheet H	1	2	3	4	5	6	7	8	9	10	Final
Ontario (Morrissey) 🔨	0	0	1	1	0	0	2	0	2	0	6
Saskatchewan (Silvernagle)	0	1	0	0	0	3	0	1	0	4	9

Sheet J	1	2	3	4	5	6	7	8	9	10	Final
Nova Scotia (Muise) 🔨	0	0	1	0	2	0	2	0	2	X	7
British Columbia (Wark)	0	0	0	1	0	1	0	2	0	X	4

==== Draw 2 ====
Sheet B	1	2	3	4	5	6	7	8	9	10	Final
Yukon (Shaw) 🔨	1	0	0	0	3	0	1	0	X	X	5
Quebec (Cantin)	0	2	0	4	0	2	0	3	X	X	11

Sheet D	1	2	3	4	5	6	7	8	9	10	Final
Manitoba (Neufeld) 🔨	1	1	0	1	0	1	0	1	0	X	5
Alberta (Robertson)	0	0	2	0	3	0	1	0	1	X	7

Sheet F	1	2	3	4	5	6	7	8	9	10	Final
Northern Ontario (Horgan) 🔨	0	1	0	0	0	0	0	1	1	1	4
Nova Scotia (Muise)	0	0	0	0	2	1	2	0	0	0	5

Sheet J	1	2	3	4	5	6	7	8	9	10	Final
Northwest Territories (Thompson) 🔨	0	0	2	0	0	1	1	0	1	X	5
Ontario (Morrissey)	2	2	0	1	1	0	0	1	0	X	7

==== Draw 3 ====
Sheet A	1	2	3	4	5	6	7	8	9	10	Final
British Columbia (Wark) 🔨	0	1	0	1	0	0	2	0	X	X	4
Newfoundland and Labrador (Devereaux)	1	0	2	0	2	2	0	2	X	X	9

Sheet C	1	2	3	4	5	6	7	8	9	10	Final
New Brunswick (Kelly) 🔨	2	2	1	0	3	2	X	X	X	X	10
Northwest Territories (Thompson)	0	0	0	2	0	0	X	X	X	X	2

Sheet E	1	2	3	4	5	6	7	8	9	10	Final
Quebec (Cantin) 🔨	1	1	0	1	1	2	0	1	X	X	7
Manitoba (Neufeld)	0	0	1	0	0	0	1	0	X	X	2

Sheet G	1	2	3	4	5	6	7	8	9	10	Final
Prince Edward Island (Hughes) 🔨	2	2	4	0	1	1	X	X	X	X	10
Yukon (Shaw)	0	0	0	1	0	0	X	X	X	X	1

Sheet I	1	2	3	4	5	6	7	8	9	10	Final
Saskatchewan (Silvernagle) 🔨	2	0	0	1	0	1	0	0	0	X	4
Northern Ontario (Horgan)	0	0	1	0	3	0	2	0	0	X	6

==== Draw 4 ====
Sheet B	1	2	3	4	5	6	7	8	9	10	Final
Nova Scotia (Muise) 🔨	0	2	0	2	1	0	2	2	0	X	9
Newfoundland and Labrador (Devereaux)	3	0	1	0	0	2	0	0	1	X	7

Sheet D	1	2	3	4	5	6	7	8	9	10	Final
Prince Edward Island (Hughes) 🔨	0	1	0	1	0	0	1	0	0	X	3
Quebec (Cantin)	0	0	2	0	2	2	0	2	4	X	12

Sheet F	1	2	3	4	5	6	7	8	9	10	Final
New Brunswick (Kelly) 🔨	0	0	4	0	2	0	0	3	0	X	9
Ontario (Morrissey)	0	1	0	1	0	2	1	0	1	X	6

Sheet G	1	2	3	4	5	6	7	8	9	10	Final
Northwest Territories (Thompson) 🔨	1	0	1	0	0	0	1	0	2	0	5
Saskatchewan (Silvernagle)	0	2	0	0	0	2	0	1	0	1	6

Sheet I	1	2	3	4	5	6	7	8	9	10	Final
Yukon (Shaw) 🔨	1	0	0	0	0	0	0	0	X	X	1
Manitoba (Neufeld)	0	0	0	4	2	1	1	1	X	X	9

==== Draw 5 ====
Sheet C	1	2	3	4	5	6	7	8	9	10	Final
Northern Ontario (Horgan) 🔨	3	1	0	1	2	0	0	3	0	X	10
British Columbia (Wark)	0	0	2	0	0	1	2	0	1	X	6

Sheet H	1	2	3	4	5	6	7	8	9	10	Final
Saskatchewan (Silvernagle) 🔨	2	0	2	0	3	0	1	3	X	X	11
Nova Scotia (Muise)	0	1	0	1	0	1	0	0	X	X	3

Sheet J	1	2	3	4	5	6	7	8	9	10	Final
Quebec (Cantin) 🔨	0	1	0	0	0	3	0	1	0	1	6
Alberta (Robertson)	0	0	0	2	1	0	1	0	3	0	7

==== Draw 6 ====
Sheet A	1	2	3	4	5	6	7	8	9	10	Final
Alberta (Robertson) 🔨	0	1	2	2	3	3	X	X	X	X	11
Northwest Territories (Thompson)	0	0	0	0	0	0	X	X	X	X	0

Sheet D	1	2	3	4	5	6	7	8	9	10	Final
Newfoundland and Labrador (Devereaux) 🔨	1	0	1	0	0	0	0	3	0	3	8
Yukon (Shaw)	0	1	0	2	1	1	1	0	1	0	7

Sheet E	1	2	3	4	5	6	7	8	9	10	Final
British Columbia (Wark) 🔨	2	0	0	0	1	1	0	0	1	1	6
Prince Edward Island (Hughes)	0	0	0	1	0	0	1	2	0	0	4

Sheet G	1	2	3	4	5	6	7	8	9	10	Final
Manitoba (Neufeld) 🔨	1	0	0	0	0	2	0	1	0	2	6
New Brunswick (Kelly)	0	0	1	0	1	0	4	0	1	0	7

Sheet J	1	2	3	4	5	6	7	8	9	10	11	Final
Ontario (Morrissey) 🔨	2	0	2	1	0	1	0	0	0	1	0	7
Northern Ontario (Horgan)	0	2	0	0	2	0	1	2	0	0	2	9

==== Draw 7 ====
Sheet A	1	2	3	4	5	6	7	8	9	10	Final
Ontario (Morrissey) 🔨	2	1	1	0	2	0	0	1	0	X	7
Nova Scotia (Muise)	0	0	0	1	0	2	1	0	1	X	5

Sheet C	1	2	3	4	5	6	7	8	9	10	Final
Yukon (Shaw) 🔨	1	0	1	0	0	0	1	X	X	X	3
Alberta (Robertson)	0	3	0	2	1	3	0	X	X	X	9

Sheet F	1	2	3	4	5	6	7	8	9	10	Final
Manitoba (Neufeld) 🔨	1	0	0	2	0	3	1	0	4	X	11
Northwest Territories (Thompson)	0	1	0	0	2	0	0	1	0	X	4

Sheet H	1	2	3	4	5	6	7	8	9	10	Final
Northern Ontario (Horgan) 🔨	2	4	0	1	0	2	1	X	X	X	10
Newfoundland and Labrador (Devereaux)	0	0	1	0	1	0	0	X	X	X	2

==== Draw 8 ====
Sheet D	1	2	3	4	5	6	7	8	9	10	Final
New Brunswick (Kelly) 🔨	0	2	0	3	1	3	X	X	X	X	9
Saskatchewan (Silvernagle)	0	0	1	0	0	0	X	X	X	X	1

Sheet F	1	2	3	4	5	6	7	8	9	10	Final
British Columbia (Wark) 🔨	0	4	0	0	2	0	1	0	0	X	7
Yukon (Shaw)	0	0	2	1	0	0	0	0	1	X	4

Sheet G	1	2	3	4	5	6	7	8	9	10	Final
Nova Scotia (Muise) 🔨	0	0	0	1	0	1	0	3	0	X	5
Prince Edward Island (Hughes)	0	0	1	0	5	0	1	0	1	X	8

Sheet I	1	2	3	4	5	6	7	8	9	10	Final
Newfoundland and Labrador (Devereaux) 🔨	1	0	1	0	0	3	0	0	3	X	8
Quebec (Cantin)	0	1	0	2	1	0	3	2	0	X	9

==== Draw 9 ====
Sheet B	1	2	3	4	5	6	7	8	9	10	Final
Prince Edward Island (Hughes) 🔨	1	0	2	0	0	2	1	0	1	0	7
Manitoba (Neufeld)	0	2	0	0	2	0	0	2	0	2	8

Sheet D	1	2	3	4	5	6	7	8	9	10	Final
Northwest Territories (Thompson) 🔨	2	0	0	0	0	2	2	0	0	X	6
Northern Ontario (Horgan)	0	2	3	1	2	0	0	2	1	X	11

Sheet E	1	2	3	4	5	6	7	8	9	10	Final
Alberta (Robertson) 🔨	2	2	0	4	0	1	2	X	X	X	11
Ontario (Morrissey)	0	0	1	0	1	0	0	X	X	X	2

Sheet H	1	2	3	4	5	6	7	8	9	10	Final
Quebec (Cantin) 🔨	1	0	1	0	0	3	0	3	0	2	10
New Brunswick (Kelly)	0	1	0	2	1	0	2	0	1	0	7

Sheet J	1	2	3	4	5	6	7	8	9	10	Final
Saskatchewan (Silvernagle) 🔨	1	0	0	1	3	0	1	0	0	X	6
British Columbia (Wark)	0	0	2	0	0	4	0	1	1	X	8

==== Draw 10 ====
Sheet B	1	2	3	4	5	6	7	8	9	10	Final
Alberta (Robertson) 🔨	0	2	0	2	0	3	2	0	4	X	13
Saskatchewan (Silvernagle)	0	2	0	2	0	0	0	1	0	X	5

Sheet C	1	2	3	4	5	6	7	8	9	10	Final
Newfoundland and Labrador (Devereaux) 🔨	1	0	0	1	0	0	2	2	0	1	7
Manitoba (Neufeld)	0	1	1	0	1	1	0	0	1	0	5

Sheet G	1	2	3	4	5	6	7	8	9	10	Final
British Columbia (Wark) 🔨	0	1	0	2	0	0	0	0	X	X	3
Quebec (Cantin)	2	0	4	0	1	1	2	1	X	X	11

==== Draw 11 ====
Sheet B	1	2	3	4	5	6	7	8	9	10	Final
Quebec (Cantin) 🔨	0	1	0	0	0	1	0	3	2	X	7
Northwest Territories (Thompson)	0	0	1	0	1	0	2	0	0	X	4

Sheet C	1	2	3	4	5	6	7	8	9	10	Final
New Brunswick (Kelly) 🔨	0	0	3	0	0	1	0	1	0	1	6
Northern Ontario (Horgan)	0	0	0	1	1	0	1	0	1	0	4

Sheet E	1	2	3	4	5	6	7	8	9	10	Final
Nova Scotia (Muise) 🔨	2	0	0	1	0	1	1	0	1	1	7
Yukon (Shaw)	0	1	1	0	1	0	0	2	0	0	5

Sheet H	1	2	3	4	5	6	7	8	9	10	Final
Prince Edward Island (Hughes) 🔨	0	0	0	0	1	0	0	0	X	X	1
Alberta (Robertson)	0	1	1	2	0	1	1	1	X	X	7

Sheet I	1	2	3	4	5	6	7	8	9	10	Final
Manitoba (Neufeld) 🔨	0	0	1	0	1	0	1	0	1	1	5
Ontario (Morrissey)	0	0	0	1	0	1	0	2	0	0	4

==== Draw 12 ====
Sheet A	1	2	3	4	5	6	7	8	9	10	Final
Northern Ontario (Horgan) 🔨	0	3	0	1	0	0	2	0	1	X	7
Prince Edward Island (Hughes)	0	0	2	0	1	1	0	4	0	X	8

Sheet C	1	2	3	4	5	6	7	8	9	10	Final
Northwest Territories (Thompson) 🔨	0	0	1	0	0	1	0	0	0	X	2
Nova Scotia (Muise)	0	0	0	1	1	0	3	1	1	X	7

Sheet F	1	2	3	4	5	6	7	8	9	10	Final
Ontario (Morrissey) 🔨	1	0	1	0	1	2	0	0	2	X	7
British Columbia (Wark)	0	1	0	2	0	0	0	2	0	X	5

Sheet G	1	2	3	4	5	6	7	8	9	10	Final
Saskatchewan (Silvernagle) 🔨	1	0	0	1	0	3	0	0	0	2	7
Newfoundland and Labrador (Devereaux)	0	1	2	0	1	0	1	1	0	0	6

Sheet J	1	2	3	4	5	6	7	8	9	10	Final
Yukon (Shaw) 🔨	1	0	0	0	1	0	1	0	1	X	4
New Brunswick (Kelly)	0	2	1	1	0	1	0	1	0	X	6

==== Draw 13 ====
Sheet A	1	2	3	4	5	6	7	8	9	10	Final
Nova Scotia (Muise) 🔨	0	0	0	0	0	1	1	0	X	X	2
Quebec (Cantin)	3	1	1	2	1	0	0	1	X	X	9

Sheet D	1	2	3	4	5	6	7	8	9	10	11	Final
British Columbia (Wark) 🔨	1	0	1	0	0	2	1	0	2	0	2	9
Manitoba (Neufeld)	0	2	0	1	2	0	0	1	0	1	0	7

Sheet G	1	2	3	4	5	6	7	8	9	10	Final
Prince Edward Island (Hughes) 🔨	0	0	0	1	0	1	0	2	0	X	4
New Brunswick (Kelly)	0	1	1	0	0	0	3	0	3	X	8

Sheet I	1	2	3	4	5	6	7	8	9	10	Final
Northern Ontario (Horgan) 🔨	1	0	3	2	4	0	X	X	X	X	10
Yukon (Shaw)	0	1	0	0	0	1	X	X	X	X	2

==== Draw 14 ====
Sheet B	1	2	3	4	5	6	7	8	9	10	Final
Ontario (Morrissey) 🔨	1	0	0	2	1	0	1	0	0	X	5
Newfoundland and Labrador (Devereaux)	0	1	1	0	0	1	0	3	1	X	7

Sheet F	1	2	3	4	5	6	7	8	9	10	Final
Alberta (Robertson) 🔨	0	0	1	0	2	0	0	2	1	X	6
Northern Ontario (Horgan)	0	0	0	2	0	1	1	0	0	X	4

Sheet H	1	2	3	4	5	6	7	8	9	10	Final
Northwest Territories (Thompson) 🔨	0	0	0	1	0	0	X	X	X	X	1
British Columbia (Wark)	1	2	4	0	2	1	X	X	X	X	10

Sheet I	1	2	3	4	5	6	7	8	9	10	Final
Saskatchewan (Silvernagle) 🔨	0	1	0	1	1	1	0	0	0	1	5
Prince Edward Island (Hughes)	0	0	2	0	0	0	1	0	1	0	4

==== Draw 15 ====
Sheet A	1	2	3	4	5	6	7	8	9	10	Final
Yukon (Shaw) 🔨	0	1	0	2	0	0	1	0	2	X	6
Northwest Territories (Thompson)	2	0	2	0	1	2	0	3	0	X	10

Sheet C	1	2	3	4	5	6	7	8	9	10	Final
Quebec (Cantin) 🔨	2	0	1	1	0	1	0	2	0	X	7
Ontario (Morrissey)	0	0	0	0	1	0	2	0	1	X	4

Sheet E	1	2	3	4	5	6	7	8	9	10	Final
Manitoba (Neufeld) 🔨	1	0	0	0	1	2	1	0	1	0	6
Saskatchewan (Silvernagle)	0	0	3	1	0	0	0	2	0	1	7

Sheet H	1	2	3	4	5	6	7	8	9	10	Final
Newfoundland and Labrador (Deveraux) 🔨	1	0	2	0	2	0	0	2	0	0	7
Alberta (Robertson)	0	2	0	1	0	3	1	0	1	1	9

Sheet I	1	2	3	4	5	6	7	8	9	10	Final
New Brunswick (Kelly) 🔨	0	3	1	0	2	0	2	0	X	X	8
Nova Scotia (Muise)	0	0	0	1	0	1	0	1	X	X	3

==== Draw 16 ====
Sheet C	1	2	3	4	5	6	7	8	9	10	Final
Saskatchewan (Silvernagle) 🔨	1	0	3	1	0	0	0	0	1	1	7
Yukon (Shaw)	0	1	0	0	2	1	1	1	0	0	6

Sheet E	1	2	3	4	5	6	7	8	9	10	Final
Prince Edward Island (Hughes) 🔨	2	1	0	5	0	0	1	0	3	X	12
Northwest Territories (Thompson)	0	0	3	0	2	1	0	2	0	X	8

Sheet G	1	2	3	4	5	6	7	8	9	10	Final
Northern Ontario (Horgan) 🔨	1	0	2	1	4	0	2	X	X	X	10
Quebec (Cantin)	0	1	0	0	0	1	0	X	X	X	2

Sheet I	1	2	3	4	5	6	7	8	9	10	11	Final
British Columbia (Wark) 🔨	1	0	0	1	0	0	0	1	0	2	0	5
Alberta (Robertson)	0	1	1	0	2	0	0	0	1	0	2	7

==== Draw 17 ====
Sheet B	1	2	3	4	5	6	7	8	9	10	Final
Manitoba (Neufeld) 🔨	1	0	0	3	0	0	2	0	0	1	7
Northern Ontario (Horgan)	0	1	1	0	1	0	0	2	1	0	6

Sheet D	1	2	3	4	5	6	7	8	9	10	Final
Alberta (Robertson) 🔨	2	0	2	2	0	0	3	X	X	X	9
Nova Scotia (Muise)	0	1	0	0	0	1	0	X	X	X	2

Sheet E	1	2	3	4	5	6	7	8	9	10	Final
Newfoundland and Labrador (Devereaux) 🔨	0	1	0	0	1	0	0	2	0	X	4
New Brunswick (Kelly)	0	0	3	2	0	1	0	0	1	X	7

Sheet H	1	2	3	4	5	6	7	8	9	10	Final
Yukon (Shaw) 🔨	0	0	0	1	0	1	0	X	X	X	2
Ontario (Morrissey)	5	1	0	0	1	0	1	X	X	X	8

==== Draw 18 ====
Sheet B	1	2	3	4	5	6	7	8	9	10	Final
New Brunswick (Kelly) 🔨	1	0	2	0	1	1	0	2	0	0	7
British Columbia (Wark)	0	1	0	2	0	0	3	0	0	2	8

Sheet D	1	2	3	4	5	6	7	8	9	10	Final
Ontario (Morrissey) 🔨	1	0	0	1	0	2	0	0	1	X	5
Prince Edward Island (Hughes)	0	0	2	0	4	0	1	1	0	X	8

Sheet F	1	2	3	4	5	6	7	8	9	10	Final
Quebec (Cantin) 🔨	2	0	2	0	1	2	0	3	X	X	10
Saskatchewan (Silvernagle)	0	1	0	0	0	0	1	0	X	X	2

Sheet H	1	2	3	4	5	6	7	8	9	10	Final
Nova Scotia (Muise) 🔨	0	2	0	0	0	1	1	1	0	1	6
Manitoba (Neufeld)	1	0	1	0	1	0	0	0	1	0	4

Sheet J	1	2	3	4	5	6	7	8	9	10	Final
Northwest Territories (Thompson) 🔨	1	2	1	0	1	0	0	1	0	0	6
Newfoundland and Labrador (Devereaux)	0	0	0	2	0	1	1	0	4	0	8

=== Playoffs ===
Semifinal		Final
New Brunswick	7
Quebec	5	Alberta	6
		New Brunswick	9

==== Semifinal ====
Sheet D	1	2	3	4	5	6	7	8	9	10	Final
New Brunswick (Kelly)	0	0	1	0	1	2	0	3	0	X	7
Quebec (Cantin) 🔨	1	0	0	2	0	0	1	0	1	X	5

Player percentages
New Brunswick		Quebec	
Lianne Sobey	68%	Julie Cantin	78%
Jodie deSolla	74%	Amelie Blais	68%
Kristen MacDiarmid	75%	Anne-Marie Filteau	75%
Andrea Kelly	74%	Marie-Christine Cantin	64%
Total	73%	Total	71%

==== Final ====
Sheet C	1	2	3	4	5	6	7	8	9	10	Final
Alberta (Robertson) 🔨	1	0	2	0	1	1	1	0	0	0	6
New Brunswick (Kelly)	0	0	0	4	0	0	0	2	2	1	9

Player percentages
Alberta		New Brunswick	
Stephanie Jordan	73%	Lianne Sobey	72%
Jennifer Perry	70%	Jodie deSolla	93%
Cary-Anne Sallows	76%	Kristen MacDiarmid	86%
Desiree Robertson	65%	Andrea Kelly	79%
Total	71%	Total	83%

== Qualification ==
=== Ontario ===
The Teranet Ontario Junior Curling Championships were held January 5–9 at the Peterborough Curling Club in Peterborough.

Erin Morrissey of the Rideau Curling Club defeated Laura Payne from the Prescott Curling Club in the women's final. Payne had beaten the Leslie Bishop rink from the Weston club in Toronto 8–5 in the semifinals.

In the men's final, Mark Bice of Sarnia defeated Mike Callan of Oakville 9–3.
