= Jillian Babin =

Canadian curler

- Curler
- Other names: Jillian Keough; Jillian Babin-Keough
- Born: Jillian Babin; November 7, 1989 (age 37); Dalhousie, New Brunswick

Team
- Curling club: Capital WC, Fredericton, NB

Curling career
- Member Association: New Brunswick
- Hearts: 7 (2010, 2011, 2012, 2017, 2019, 2020, 2022)
- Top CTRS ranking: 15th (2021–22)
Medal record
Representing New Brunswick
Scotties Tournament of Hearts
Bronze medal – third place	2022 Thunder Bay

Jillian Elizabeth Babin (born November 7, 1989) is a Canadian curler from Fredericton, New Brunswick. She currently plays second on Team Andrea Crawford. She has won five New Brunswick Scotties Tournament of Hearts and represented New Brunswick at the 2007 Canada Winter Games.

== Career ==
=== Juniors ===
Babin won one provincial junior title in 2009 as third for Ashley Howard. At the 2009 Canadian Junior Curling Championships in Salmon Arm, British Columbia, The Howard rink finished in eighth place with a 5–7 record. Also with Howard, she represented New Brunswick at the 2007 Canada Winter Games, where they just missed the playoffs with a 3–2 record.

=== Women's ===
Babin won the 2010 New Brunswick Scotties Tournament of Hearts as second for the Andrea Crawford rink. At the 2010 Scotties Tournament of Hearts, the team went 5–6, missing the playoffs. Her team also won provincials the following year at the 2011 New Brunswick Scotties Tournament of Hearts where they defeated Sylvie Robichaud in the final. At the 2011 Scotties Tournament of Hearts in Charlottetown, team New Brunswick went 3–8. She won her third consecutive provincial title at the 2012 New Brunswick Scotties Tournament of Hearts. New Brunswick went 5–6 once again at the Hearts.

Babin took a break from competitive curling for a few years before returning in 2017 as second for Jennifer Armstrong. At provincials, the team lost in the semifinal to Sarah Mallais.

After Cathlia Ward moved to skip her own team in Newfoundland and Labrador, the team brought on Babin's former teammate Andrea Crawford to skip the team. At the 2019 New Brunswick Scotties Tournament of Hearts, Team Crawford posted a perfect 5–0 record en route to capturing the title. At the Hearts, the team went 3–4, missing the playoffs.

To start the 2019–20 season, Team Crawford won their first two events, the Steele Cup Cash and the Atlantic Superstore Monctonian Challenge. They played in a Grand Slam event, the 2019 Tour Challenge Tier 2. After a 2–2 round robin record, they lost the tiebreaker to Jestyn Murphy. The team defended their provincial title by winning the 2020 New Brunswick Scotties Tournament of Hearts in late January 2020. At the Hearts, the Crawford rink started with three losses before rallying off four wins in a row including scoring a seven ender against top-seeded Manitoba's Kerri Einarson rink to win 13–7 and defeating Team Canada (skipped by Chelsea Carey) 7–5. Their 4–3 round robin record qualified them for the tiebreaker against Saskatchewan's Robyn Silvernagle rink. Saskatchewan took two in the extra end for a 9–7 victory, eliminating New Brunswick from contention. The team announced on June 18, 2020, that they would be adding Sylvie Quillian to the team at third.

Due to the COVID-19 pandemic in New Brunswick, the 2021 provincial championship was cancelled. As the reigning provincial champions, Team Crawford was given the invitation to represent New Brunswick at the 2021 Scotties Tournament of Hearts, but they declined due to work and family commitments. Team Melissa Adams was then invited in their place, which they accepted.

Team Crawford played in five tour events during the 2021–22 season, performing well in all of them. In their first event, The Curling Store Cashspiel, the team reached the final where they lost to Nova Scotia's Christina Black upon giving up a stolen victory. They then lost in the final of the Steele Cup Cash two weeks later to the Melodie Forsythe rink. They would then secure two victories in their next two events, going undefeated to claim the titles of the Dave Jones Stanhope Simpson Insurance Mayflower Cashspiel and the Atlantic Superstore Monctonian Challenge. The team then had a semifinal finish at the Stu Sells 1824 Halifax Classic, dropping the semifinal game to Switzerland's Corrie Hürlimann.

The 2022 New Brunswick Scotties Tournament of Hearts was cancelled due to the pandemic and Team Crawford were selected to represent their province at the 2022 Scotties Tournament of Hearts in Thunder Bay, Ontario. At the Hearts, the team began the event with five straight wins, the most consecutive wins to start a Tournament of Hearts of any New Brunswick team. Team Crawford finished the round robin with a 6–2 record, qualifying for the playoff round over higher seeded teams such as Wild Card #2 (Chelsea Carey), Wild Card #3 (Emma Miskew) and Saskatchewan's Penny Barker. They then defeated the Northwest Territories' Kerry Galusha in the knockout round and upset Team Canada's Kerri Einarson to reach the 1 vs. 2 page playoff game, becoming the first New Brunswick team to reach the playoffs since Heidi Hanlon in 1991. They then lost to Northern Ontario's Krista McCarville in the 1 vs. 2 game and Canada's Einarson rink in the semifinal, earning the bronze medal from the event.

=== Mixed ===
Babin represented New Brunswick at one Canadian Mixed Curling Championship in 2018 with Chris Jeffrey, Brian King and Katie Forward. The team finished 2–4 at the 2019 Canadian Mixed Curling Championship, missing the playoffs.

== Personal life ==
Babin currently works as a self-employed chiropractor.

== Teams ==
Season	Skip	Third	Second	Lead
2008–09	Ashley Howard	Jillian Babin	Melissa Menzies	Emily MacRae
2009–10	Andrea Crawford	Denise Nowlan	Jillian Babin	Lianne Sobey
2010–11	Andrea Crawford	Denise Nowlan	Jillian Babin	Lianne Sobey
2011–12	Andrea Crawford (Fourth)	Rebecca Atkinson (Skip)	Jillian Babin	Jodie deSolla
2017–18	Jennifer Armstrong	Cathlia Ward	Jillian Keough	Katie Forward
2018–19	Andrea Crawford	Jillian Babin	Jennifer Armstrong	Katie Forward
2019–20	Andrea Crawford	Jennifer Armstrong	Jillian Babin	Katie Forward
2020–21	Andrea Crawford	Sylvie Quillian	Jillian Babin	Katie Forward
2021–22	Andrea Crawford	Sylvie Quillian	Jillian Babin	Katie Forward
