= 2010 New Brunswick Scotties Tournament of Hearts =

- Host city: Saint John, New Brunswick
- Arena: Thistle St. Andrews Curling Club
- Dates: January 6–10
- Winner: Team Kelly
- Curling club: Capital Winter Club
- Skip: Andrea Kelly
- Third: Denise Nowlan
- Second: Jillian Babin
- Lead: Lianne Sobey
- Finalist: Ashley Howard

The 2010 New Brunswick Scotties Tournament of Hearts was held January 6–10 in Saint John, New Brunswick. The winning team represented New Brunswick at the 2010 Scotties Tournament of Hearts in Sault Ste. Marie, Ontario.

== Teams ==
Skip	Third	Second	Lead	Club
Melissa Adams	Sandy Comeau	Stacey Leger	Pamela Nicol	Grand Falls Curling Club, Grand Falls
Heidi Hanlon	Kathy Floyd	Susan Dobson	Jane Arsenau	Thistle St. Andrews Curling Club, Saint John
Ashley Howard	Jaclyn Crandall	Beverley Janes-Colpitts	Nicole McCann	Capital Winter Club, Fredericton
Andrea Kelly	Denise Nowlan	Jillian Babin	Lianne Sobey	Capital Winter Club, Fredericton
Sharon Levesque	Maureen McMaster	Shawn Stubbert	Carol Patterson	Capital Winter Club, Fredericton
Mary Jane McGuire	Megan McGuire	Sarah Berthelot	Jocelyn Adams	Capital Winter Club, Fredericton
Sylvie Robichaud	Danielle Nicholson	Marie Richard	Kendra Dickison	Curling Beauséjour Inc., Moncton
Jessica Ronalds	Shannon Williams	Stephanie Taylor	Michelle Majeau	Curling Beauséjour Inc., Moncton

== Standings ==
Skip (Club)	W	L	PF	PA	Ends Won	Ends Lost	Blank Ends	Stolen Ends
Andrea Kelly (CWC)	7	0	48	21	28	18	16	9
Melissa Adams (Grand Falls)	5	2	40	31	29	25	10	11
Ashley Howard (CWC)	4	3	43	41	28	30	7	8
Sylvie Robichaud (Beauséjour)	3	4	46	36	30	27	7	12
Jessica Ronalds (Beauséjour)	3	4	40	47	25	27	9	5
Mary Jane McGuire (CWC)	3	4	44	40	26	25	12	9
Heidi Hanlon (Thistle)	2	5	43	53	29	34	2	7
Sharon Levesque (CWC)	1	6	25	51	22	31	7	11

== Results ==
=== Draw 1 ===
January 6, 7:05 PM

Sheet 4	1	2	3	4	5	6	7	8	9	10	Final
McGuire	2	3	0	1	0	1	1	0	0	X	8
Hanlon	0	0	1	0	2	0	0	2	1	X	6

Sheet 5	1	2	3	4	5	6	7	8	9	10	Final
Levesque	1	0	1	0	1	1	1	0	0	X	5
Howard	0	2	0	2	0	0	0	3	1	X	8

Sheet 6	1	2	3	4	5	6	7	8	9	10	Final
Ronalds	0	0	2	1	0	1	0	0	1	0	5
Robichaud	1	0	0	0	0	0	1	1	0	1	4

Sheet 7	1	2	3	4	5	6	7	8	9	10	Final
Adams	0	0	1	0	0	1	0	1	0	0	3
Kelly	0	1	0	2	0	0	0	0	0	1	4

=== Draw 2 ===
January 7, 9:00 AM

Sheet 4	1	2	3	4	5	6	7	8	9	10	Final
Ronalds	0	0	1	0	0	0	1	0	X	X	2
Kelly	0	2	0	1	0	1	0	4	X	X	8

Sheet 5	1	2	3	4	5	6	7	8	9	10	Final
Adams	0	2	0	0	1	0	0	1	1	1	6
Robichaud	1	0	2	1	0	0	1	0	0	0	5

Sheet 6	1	2	3	4	5	6	7	8	9	10	Final
McGuire	2	0	0	1	0	0	2	0	1	0	6
Howard	0	1	1	0	1	1	0	1	0	3	8

Sheet 7	1	2	3	4	5	6	7	8	9	10	Final
Levesque	1	1	1	2	0	0	1	1	0	1	8
Hanlon	0	0	0	0	0	5	0	0	1	0	6

=== Draw 3 ===
January 7, 2:00 PM

Sheet 4	1	2	3	4	5	6	7	8	9	10	Final
Robichaud	1	1	1	1	0	3	1	X	X	X	8
Levesque	0	0	0	0	1	0	0	X	X	X	1

Sheet 5	1	2	3	4	5	6	7	8	9	10	Final
Kelly	2	0	0	0	0	0	2	0	1	X	5
McGuire	0	0	0	0	2	0	0	1	0	X	3

Sheet 6	1	2	3	4	5	6	7	8	9	10	Final
Hanlon	2	0	0	1	0	0	2	2	1	X	8
Adams	0	1	2	0	1	1	0	0	0	X	5

Sheet 7	1	2	3	4	5	6	7	8	9	10	Final
Howard	2	0	2	0	0	4	0	0	1	X	9
Ronalds	0	1	0	2	1	0	1	1	0	X	6

=== Draw 4 ===
January 7, 8:05 PM

Sheet 4	1	2	3	4	5	6	7	8	9	10	Final
Howard	0	1	1	0	0	0	0	1	0	1	4
Adams	0	0	0	2	0	1	0	0	2	0	5

Sheet 5	1	2	3	4	5	6	7	8	9	10	Final
Hanlon	0	2	0	1	0	1	0	1	0	X	5
Ronalds	1	0	3	0	2	0	1	0	3	X	10

Sheet 6	1	2	3	4	5	6	7	8	9	10	Final
Levesque	1	0	0	1	0	0	0	0	X	X	2
Kelly	0	1	0	0	2	4	1	1	X	X	9

Sheet 7	1	2	3	4	5	6	7	8	9	10	Final
McGuire	0	1	0	0	1	0	0	1	2	0	5
Robichaud	0	0	0	2	0	2	1	0	0	2	7

=== Draw 5 ===
January 8, 2:00 PM

Sheet 4	1	2	3	4	5	6	7	8	9	10	11	Final
Ronalds	0	0	1	0	1	0	0	3	0	2	0	7
McGuire	0	0	0	4	0	1	0	0	2	0	1	8

Sheet 5	1	2	3	4	5	6	7	8	9	10	Final
Kelly	0	1	0	0	1	1	2	0	0	X	5
Howard	0	0	0	2	0	0	0	0	1	X	3

Sheet 6	1	2	3	4	5	6	7	8	9	10	Final
Robichaud	1	0	2	1	0	3	0	0	1	0	8
Hanlon	0	1	0	0	1	0	2	3	0	2	9

Sheet 7	1	2	3	4	5	6	7	8	9	10	Final
Adams	0	2	0	1	0	1	1	0	0	1	6
Levesque	1	0	1	0	1	0	0	2	0	0	5

=== Draw 6 ===
January 8, 7:05 PM

Sheet 4	1	2	3	4	5	6	7	8	9	10	Final
Robichaud	0	3	2	1	0	0	2	2	X	X	10
Howard	1	0	0	0	2	1	0	0	X	X	4

Sheet 5	1	2	3	4	5	6	7	8	9	10	Final
McGuire	0	0	0	0	1	0	1	1	1	X	4
Adams	0	1	1	1	0	3	0	0	0	X	6

Sheet 6	1	2	3	4	5	6	7	8	9	10	Final
Ronalds	1	0	0	2	0	4	0	2	0	X	9
Levesque	0	0	2	0	1	0	1	0	0	X	4

Sheet 7	1	2	3	4	5	6	7	8	9	10	Final
Hanlon	1	0	1	0	1	0	1	1	0	X	5
Kelly	0	2	0	3	0	3	0	0	2	X	10

=== Draw 7 ===
January 9, 9:00 AM

Sheet 4	1	2	3	4	5	6	7	8	9	10	Final
Adams	1	2	2	0	3	1	X	X	X	X	9
Ronalds	0	0	0	1	0	0	X	X	X	X	1

Sheet 5	1	2	3	4	5	6	7	8	9	10	Final
Howard	1	0	0	0	1	1	0	2	0	2	7
Hanlon	0	0	1	1	0	0	1	0	1	0	4

Sheet 6	1	2	3	4	5	6	7	8	9	10	Final
Kelly	0	0	2	1	0	1	0	1	2	X	7
Robichaud	0	1	0	0	0	0	2	0	0	X	3

Sheet 7	1	2	3	4	5	6	7	8	9	10	Final
Levesque	0	0	0	0	0	0	X	X	X	X	0
McGuire	2	4	1	3	0	0	X	X	X	X	10

== Playoffs ==
Semifinal		Final
		Andrea Kelly	8
Melissa Adams	5	Ashley Howard	5
Ashley Howard	6

=== Semifinal ===
January 9, 7:05 PM

Team	1	2	3	4	5	6	7	8	9	10	Final
Adams	1	0	0	1	0	0	1	1	1	0	5
Howard	0	1	2	0	0	2	0	0	0	1	6

=== Final ===
January 10, 2:00 PM

Team	1	2	3	4	5	6	7	8	9	10	Final
Kelly	0	1	0	2	3	0	2	0	0	X	8
Howard	0	0	1	0	0	1	0	1	2	X	5
