= 2009 New Brunswick Scotties Tournament of Hearts =

- Host city: Moncton, New Brunswick
- Arena: Beaver Curling Club
- Dates: January 28 – February 1
- Winner: Team Kelly
- Curling club: Fredericton Curling Club
- Skip: Andrea Kelly
- Third: Denise Nowlan
- Second: Jodie deSolla
- Lead: Lianne Sobey
- Finalist: Mary Jane McGuire

The 2009 New Brunswick Scotties Tournament of Hearts, New Brunswick's women's provincial curling championship, was held January 28 to February 1 at the Beaver Curling Club in Moncton. The winning Andrea Kelly team represented team New Brunswick at the 2009 Scotties Tournament of Hearts in Victoria, British Columbia.

== Teams ==
Skip	Third	Second	Lead	Club(s)
Rebecca Atkinson	Jeanette Murphy	Carol Webb	Jane Boyle	Thistle St. Andrews Curling Club, Saint John
Sandy Comeau	Jessica Ronalds	Shannon Williams	Pam Nicol	Beaver Curling Club, Moncton
Shelly Graham	Lisa Freeman	Kendra Dickison	Christie Alders	Capital Winter Club, Fredericton
Heidi Hanlon	Stacey LaceyJe	Jennifer Gogan	Judy Blanchard	Thistle St. Andrews Curling Club, Saint John
Andrea Kelly	Denise Nowlan	Jodie deSolla	Lianne Sobey	Fredericton Curling Club, Fredericton
Sharon Levesque	Debbie Dickinson	Maureen MacMaster	Carol Patterson	Capital Winter Club, Fredericton
Mary Jane McGuire	Megan McGuire	Sarah Berthelot	Jocelyn Adams	Capital Winter Club, Fredericton
Sylvie Robichaud	Dannielle Nicholson	Marie Richard	Sandi Prosser	Curling Beauséjour Inc., Moncton

== Final round-robin standings ==
Team	W	L
Andrea Kelly	7	0
Mary Jane McGuire	5	2
Heidi Hanlon	4	3
Sandy Comeau	4	3
Sylvie Robichaud	3	4
Rebecca Atkinson	3	4
Sharon Levesque	1	6
Shelly Graham	1	6

== Playoffs ==
Semifinal			Final
			1	Andrea Kelly	5
2	Mary Jane McGuire	7	2	Mary Jane McGuire	4
3	Heidi Hanlon	5

=== Semifinal ===
Saturday, January 31, 7:00 pm

Sheet 2	1	2	3	4	5	6	7	8	9	10	Final
Mary Jane McGuire	0	0	2	0	1	0	4	0	0	X	7
Heidi Hanlon	0	0	0	1	0	2	0	1	1	X	5

=== Final ===
Sunday, February 1, 2:00 pm

Sheet 2	1	2	3	4	5	6	7	8	9	10	Final
Andrea Kelly	0	2	0	0	1	0	0	1	0	1	5
Mary Jane McGuire	0	0	2	1	0	0	0	0	1	0	4
