= 2011 Scotties Tournament of Hearts =

- Host city: Charlottetown, Prince Edward Island
- Arena: Charlottetown Civic Centre
- Dates: February 19–27
- Attendance: 48,473
- Winner: Saskatchewan
- Curling club: Kronau CC, Kronau, Saskatchewan
- Skip: Amber Holland
- Third: Kim Schneider
- Second: Tammy Schneider
- Lead: Heather Kalenchuk
- Alternate: Jolene Campbell
- Coach: Merv Fonger
- Finalist: Canada (Jennifer Jones)

The 2011 Scotties Tournament of Hearts, the Canadian women's national curling championship, was held from February 19 to February 27 at the Charlottetown Civic Centre in Charlottetown, Prince Edward Island. It was the 30th anniversary of Kruger Products sponsoring the tournament and the first time a Bronze Medal Game was added to the playoffs.

== Teams ==
The defending champions of team Jennifer Jones, are looking to win their fifth Scotties Championship. This will be the first Scotties appearance for the Jones' new third Kaitlyn Lawes, who was added to the team after Jones and crew parted ways with longtime third Cathy Overton-Clapham. After being kicked out of her old squad by the Jones team, Overton-Clapham announced that she hoped to once again return to the Scotties with a new team. After forming a new team, Overton-Clapham won the Manitoba Provincials. She will be making her skipping debut at this year's Scotties, with the goal of winning her record-tying sixth Scotties Championship.

Looking to take home their province's first Scotties Championship, Suzanne Birt (Gaudet) defeated last year's Scotties runner up Kathy O'Rourke in the provincial playdowns and, for the sixth time, will be representing Prince Edward Island at home in Charlottetown. Kelly Scott is another former Scotties champion who is looking to take home third title, and will once again represent British Columbia. After losing the 2008 Scotties Tournament of Hearts to Jennifer Jones, Shannon Kleibrink will make her fourth Scotties appearance representing Alberta.

Amber Holland and her team from Kronau are making their second appearance as Team Saskatchewan, and looking to improve last year's record of 6–5. Making her sixth appearance in seven years, Kerry Galusha will be once again representing Yukon/Northwest Territories. The last two Scotties have seen Galusha's team in 2009 and Sharon Cormier in 2010 defeat defending champions Jennifer Jones in round robin play. This year they look to advance to the playoffs. Canadian junior champion Rachel Homan will be making her debut as skip, representing Ontario after defeating defending provincial champion Krista McCarville in the Ontario finals. Alongside Homan is former Canadian junior champion Stacie Devereaux who will represent Newfoundland and Labrador, making her skipping debut at the Scotties.

Making her fifth appearance as team New Brunswick is Andrea Kelly; she is looking to improve her record and is looking to win her first Scotties title. Heather Smith-Dacey will make her second appearance as skip at this year's Tournament of Hearts, representing Nova Scotia. Smith-Dacey and team pulled together when their skip, six time Scotties Champion, Colleen Jones, was hospitalized with meningitis. They managed to pull through and win their provincial title. Quebec was the last province to qualify. Six time provincial champion Marie-France Larouche defeated two time provincial champion Chantal Osborne. In her last four Scotties appearances, Larouche has made it to the playoffs but has been unsuccessful in winning a national title. This year Larouche is looking to take the title home.

10 of the 12 skips are previous Canadian Junior Champions. Overton-Clapham won in 1989, Smith-Dacey in 1991, Holland in 1992, Jones in 1994, Scott in 1995, Larouche in 1999, Birt in 2001 & 2002, Kelly in 2005, Devereaux in 2007 and Homan in 2010. Only Kleibrink and Galusha have not previously won a Junior title. Had Kleibrink not lost to 1996 champion Heather Nedohin in the Alberta final, it would have been 11 teams.

The teams were listed as follows:

Canada	Alberta	British Columbia
St. Vital CC, Winnipeg Skip: Jennifer Jones; Third: Kaitlyn Lawes; Second: Jill Officer; Lead: Dawn Askin (Note: Team Canada alternate Janet Arnott threw lead stones in the last end of Draw 3 and the last two ends of Draw 7.); Alternate: Janet Arnott	Calgary WC, Calgary Skip: Shannon Kleibrink; Third: Amy Nixon; Second: Bronwen Webster; Lead: Chelsey Bell (Note: Team Alberta alternate Crystal Webster threw lead stones in the last two ends of Draw 12.); Alternate: Crystal Webster	Kelowna CC, Kelowna Skip: Kelly Scott; Third: Jeanna Schraeder; Second: Sasha Carter (Note: Team British Columbia alternate Shannon Aleksic threw second stones in Draws 8 and 14.); Lead: Jacquie Armstrong; Alternate: Shannon Aleksic
Manitoba	New Brunswick	Newfoundland and Labrador
Fort Rouge CC, Winnipeg Skip: Cathy Overton-Clapham; Third: Karen Fallis (Note: For Draw 9, Team Manitoba alternate Breanne Meakin threw third stones, third Karen Fallis threw lead stones, while lead Raunora Westcott sat out.); Second: Leslie Wilson; Lead: Raunora Westcott (Note: Team Manitoba alternate Breanne Meakin threw lead stones in the last two ends of Draw 5.); Alternate: Breanne Meakin	Gage G&CC, Oromocto Skip: Andrea Kelly; Third: Denise Nowlan; Second: Jillian Babin; Lead: Lianne Sobey (Note: Team New Brunswick alternate Jodie deSolla threw lead stones in the last two ends off Draw 7.); Alternate: Jodie deSolla	Bally Haly G&CC, St. John's Skip: Stacie Devereaux; Third: Stephanie Guzzwell; Second: Sarah Paul (Note: Team Newfoundland & Labrador alternate Julie Devereaux threw second stones in Draw 14.); Lead: Heather Martin; Alternate: Julie Devereaux
Nova Scotia	Ontario	Prince Edward Island
Mayflower CC, Halifax Skip: Heather Smith-Dacey; Third: Danielle Parsons; Second: Blisse Comstock; Lead: Teri Lake; Alternate: Melanie Comstock	Ottawa CC, Ottawa Skip: Rachel Homan; Third: Emma Miskew; Second: Alison Kreviazuk; Lead: Lisa Weagle (Note: Team Ontario alternate Sherry Middaugh threw lead stones in the last end of Draws 4, 6, and 10 and all of Draw 11.); Alternate: Sherry Middaugh	Charlottetown CC, Charlottetown Skip: Suzanne Birt; Third: Shelly Bradley; Second: Robyn MacPhee; Lead: Leslie MacDougall (Note: Team Prince Edward Island alternate Tricia Affleck threw lead stones in the last end of Draws 5 and 6.); Alternate: Tricia Affleck
Quebec	Saskatchewan	Northwest Territories/Yukon
CC Etchemin, Saint-Romuald Skip: Marie-France Larouche; Third: Annie Lemay; Second: Véronique Grégoire; Lead: Véronique Brassard (Note: Team Quebec alternate Joëlle Sabourin threw lead stones in the last end of Draw 9.); Alternate: Joëlle Sabourin	Kronau CC, Kronau Skip: Amber Holland; Third: Kim Schneider; Second: Tammy Schneider (Note: Team Saskatchewan alternate Jolene Campbell threw second stones in Draw 17.); Lead: Heather Kalenchuk (Note: Team Saskatchewan alternate Jolene Campbell threw lead stones in the last end of Draw 5 and the last three ends of Draw 11.); Alternate: Jolene Campbell	Yellowknife CC, Yellowknife Skip: Kerry Galusha; Third: Dawn Moses; Second: Wendy Miller (Note: Team Northwest Territories/Yukon alternate Sharon Cormier threw second stones in the last three ends of Draw 14.); Lead: Shona Barbour (Note: Team Northwest Territories/Yukon alternate Sharon Cormier threw lead stones in Draws 5 and 13.); Alternate: Sharon Cormier

== Map of teams ==
Team Canada Provincial Winners

== Round robin standings ==
Final Round Robin standings

Key
Teams to Playoffs
Teams to Tiebreaker

Locale	Skip	W	L	W–L	PF	PA	EW	EL	BE	SE	S%
Saskatchewan	Amber Holland	9	2	–	87	59	43	47	9	9	81%
Canada	Jennifer Jones	8	3	1–0	87	54	50	37	9	16	84%
Ontario	Rachel Homan	8	3	0–1	77	51	52	36	9	18	80%
Nova Scotia	Heather Smith-Dacey	7	4	1–0	77	69	46	46	9	15	76%
British Columbia	Kelly Scott	7	4	0–1	64	61	51	39	13	17	76%
Prince Edward Island	Suzanne Birt	6	5	1–0	69	66	45	40	18	14	77%
Alberta	Shannon Kleibrink	6	5	0–1	76	66	49	49	8	12	80%
Quebec	Marie-France Larouche	4	7	1–0	73	78	48	49	7	8	77%
Manitoba	Cathy Overton-Clapham	4	7	0–1	69	76	48	55	5	11	72%
Northwest Territories/Yukon	Kerry Galusha	3	8	1–0	48	86	36	51	11	5	70%
New Brunswick	Andrea Kelly	3	8	0–1	58	76	42	49	10	9	75%
Newfoundland and Labrador	Stacie Devereaux	1	10	–	54	86	34	56	6	5	68%

== Round Robin results ==
All draw times are listed in Atlantic Time (UTC−04:00).

=== Draw 1 ===
Saturday, February 19, 2:30 pm

Sheet A	1	2	3	4	5	6	7	8	9	10	Final
Ontario (Homan) 🔨	0	1	0	2	1	1	0	4	X	X	9
Nova Scotia (Smith-Dacey)	1	0	1	0	0	0	1	0	X	X	3

Sheet B	1	2	3	4	5	6	7	8	9	10	Final
Northwest Territories/Yukon (Galusha)	0	0	1	0	0	1	0	0	X	X	2
Alberta (Kleibrink) 🔨	0	1	0	2	4	0	1	1	X	X	9

Sheet C	1	2	3	4	5	6	7	8	9	10	Final
Prince Edward Island (Birt) 🔨	3	0	1	0	0	0	2	0	0	X	6
New Brunswick (Kelly)	0	2	0	2	2	2	0	1	0	X	9

Sheet D	1	2	3	4	5	6	7	8	9	10	Final
Manitoba (Overton-Clapham)	0	0	1	1	0	0	2	0	2	X	6
Saskatchewan (Holland) 🔨	0	3	0	0	2	2	0	1	0	X	8

=== Draw 2 ===
Saturday, February 19, 7:30 pm

Sheet A	1	2	3	4	5	6	7	8	9	10	Final
Manitoba (Overton-Clapham)	1	0	3	0	1	0	1	1	0	X	7
Northwest Territories/Yukon (Galusha) 🔨	0	0	0	2	0	1	0	0	1	X	4

Sheet B	1	2	3	4	5	6	7	8	9	10	Final
British Columbia (Scott)	0	1	1	0	1	1	1	0	2	X	7
Newfoundland and Labrador (Devereaux) 🔨	0	0	0	1	0	0	0	1	0	X	2

Sheet C	1	2	3	4	5	6	7	8	9	10	Final
Quebec (Larouche) 🔨	0	0	1	0	1	0	2	0	2	0	6
Canada (Jones)	0	0	0	2	0	3	0	1	0	1	7

Sheet D	1	2	3	4	5	6	7	8	9	10	Final
New Brunswick (Kelly) 🔨	1	0	2	0	0	1	1	0	2	0	7
Nova Scotia (Smith-Dacey)	0	2	0	1	1	0	0	2	0	2	8

=== Draw 3 ===
Sunday, February 20, 9:30 am

Sheet A	1	2	3	4	5	6	7	8	9	10	Final
Newfoundland and Labrador (Devereaux)	3	1	0	0	1	0	5	X	X	X	10
New Brunswick (Kelly) 🔨	0	0	1	2	0	1	0	X	X	X	4

Sheet B	1	2	3	4	5	6	7	8	9	10	Final
Nova Scotia (Smith-Dacey)	0	2	0	1	0	0	1	1	0	X	5
Quebec (Larouche) 🔨	1	0	1	0	4	1	0	0	3	X	10

Sheet C	1	2	3	4	5	6	7	8	9	10	Final
British Columbia (Scott)	0	0	1	0	1	0	1	0	3	X	6
Manitoba (Overton-Clapham) 🔨	0	0	0	2	0	2	0	0	0	X	4

Sheet D	1	2	3	4	5	6	7	8	9	10	Final
Canada (Jones) 🔨	1	1	1	3	0	5	1	X	X	X	12
Northwest Territories/Yukon (Galusha)	0	0	0	0	1	0	0	X	X	X	1

=== Draw 4 ===
Sunday, February 20, 2:30 pm

Sheet A	1	2	3	4	5	6	7	8	9	10	11	Final
Alberta (Kleibrink)	0	1	0	2	0	1	0	1	0	1	1	7
British Columbia (Scott) 🔨	0	0	2	0	1	0	1	0	2	0	0	6

Sheet B	1	2	3	4	5	6	7	8	9	10	Final
Saskatchewan (Holland)	1	0	2	2	0	1	0	3	X	X	9
Canada (Jones) 🔨	0	1	0	0	1	0	1	0	X	X	3

Sheet C	1	2	3	4	5	6	7	8	9	10	Final
Ontario (Homan)	1	0	1	1	1	2	1	X	X	X	7
Newfoundland and Labrador (Devereaux) 🔨	0	1	0	0	0	0	0	X	X	X	1

Sheet D	1	2	3	4	5	6	7	8	9	10	Final
Quebec (Larouche)	1	0	2	0	0	2	0	0	X	X	5
Prince Edward Island (Birt) 🔨	0	3	0	1	1	0	3	2	X	X	10

=== Draw 5 ===
Sunday, February 20, 7:30 pm

Sheet A	1	2	3	4	5	6	7	8	9	10	Final
Saskatchewan (Holland)	0	0	2	1	0	2	0	5	0	X	10
Prince Edward Island (Birt) 🔨	1	1	0	0	1	0	1	0	2	X	6

Sheet B	1	2	3	4	5	6	7	8	9	10	Final
New Brunswick (Kelly)	0	2	0	3	2	0	1	1	X	X	9
Manitoba (Overton-Clapham) 🔨	1	0	1	0	0	1	0	0	X	X	3

Sheet C	1	2	3	4	5	6	7	8	9	10	Final
Nova Scotia (Smith-Dacey)	0	1	1	0	2	0	3	1	X	X	8
Northwest Territories/Yukon (Galusha) 🔨	0	0	0	1	0	1	0	0	X	X	2

Sheet D	1	2	3	4	5	6	7	8	9	10	Final
Alberta (Kleibrink)	0	0	2	0	1	0	2	0	2	0	7
Ontario (Homan) 🔨	1	1	0	2	0	2	0	1	0	3	10

=== Draw 6 ===
Monday, February 21, 9:30 am

Sheet B	1	2	3	4	5	6	7	8	9	10	Final
Ontario (Homan) 🔨	0	2	1	1	0	0	4	0	X	X	8
Prince Edward Island (Birt)	0	0	0	0	1	0	0	1	X	X	2

Sheet C	1	2	3	4	5	6	7	8	9	10	Final
Alberta (Kleibrink) 🔨	0	1	0	1	0	1	1	0	2	0	6
Saskatchewan (Holland)	0	0	1	0	1	0	0	4	0	2	8

=== Draw 7 ===
Monday, February 21, 2:30 pm

Sheet A	1	2	3	4	5	6	7	8	9	10	Final
New Brunswick (Kelly)	0	0	1	0	0	1	0	1	0	X	3
Canada (Jones) 🔨	2	1	0	1	1	0	2	0	2	X	9

Sheet B	1	2	3	4	5	6	7	8	9	10	Final
Newfoundland and Labrador (Devereaux)	0	0	1	0	1	0	1	0	2	0	5
Northwest Territories/Yukon (Galusha) 🔨	0	1	0	1	0	2	0	1	0	1	6

Sheet C	1	2	3	4	5	6	7	8	9	10	Final
Manitoba (Overton-Clapham)	0	2	0	0	2	0	0	0	1	1	6
Quebec (Larouche) 🔨	2	0	1	1	0	1	1	1	0	0	7

Sheet D	1	2	3	4	5	6	7	8	9	10	Final
Nova Scotia (Smith-Dacey) 🔨	0	2	1	0	2	0	4	0	3	X	12
British Columbia (Scott)	2	0	0	1	0	2	0	1	0	X	6

=== Draw 8 ===
Monday, February 21, 7:30 pm

Sheet A	1	2	3	4	5	6	7	8	9	10	Final
Newfoundland and Labrador (Devereaux)	0	1	0	0	1	0	1	0	2	0	5
Alberta (Kleibrink) 🔨	1	0	2	1	0	2	0	1	0	1	8

Sheet B	1	2	3	4	5	6	7	8	9	10	Final
Quebec (Larouche) 🔨	0	1	0	0	2	0	1	1	0	1	6
Saskatchewan (Holland)	0	0	1	2	0	2	0	0	2	0	7

Sheet C	1	2	3	4	5	6	7	8	9	10	Final
British Columbia (Scott) 🔨	0	1	0	1	0	1	0	0	1	1	5
Ontario (Homan)	1	0	2	0	1	0	1	1	0	0	6

Sheet D	1	2	3	4	5	6	7	8	9	10	Final
Prince Edward Island (Birt)	0	0	1	1	0	0	4	2	0	X	8
Canada (Jones) 🔨	2	0	0	0	1	0	0	0	3	X	6

=== Draw 9 ===
Tuesday, February 22, 9:30 am

Sheet A	1	2	3	4	5	6	7	8	9	10	11	Final
Nova Scotia (Smith-Dacey)	0	0	1	0	1	1	3	0	1	0	1	8
Manitoba (Overton-Clapham) 🔨	1	2	0	2	0	0	0	1	0	1	0	7

Sheet B	1	2	3	4	5	6	7	8	9	10	Final
Canada (Jones)	4	1	0	0	4	1	0	X	X	X	10
British Columbia (Scott) 🔨	0	0	0	1	0	0	1	X	X	X	2

Sheet C	1	2	3	4	5	6	7	8	9	10	Final
New Brunswick (Kelly) 🔨	0	2	0	1	0	0	1	0	0	0	4
Northwest Territories/Yukon (Galusha)	0	0	1	0	2	1	0	1	0	2	7

Sheet D	1	2	3	4	5	6	7	8	9	10	Final
Newfoundland and Labrador (Devereaux)	0	0	0	1	0	2	0	3	0	X	6
Quebec (Larouche) 🔨	0	2	1	0	2	0	2	0	3	X	10

=== Draw 10 ===
Tuesday, February 22, 2:30 pm

Sheet A	1	2	3	4	5	6	7	8	9	10	Final
British Columbia (Scott)	0	1	0	1	0	2	0	2	0	1	7
Quebec (Larouche) 🔨	1	0	1	0	1	0	2	0	0	0	5

Sheet B	1	2	3	4	5	6	7	8	9	10	11	Final
Prince Edward Island (Birt)	0	2	0	0	0	1	0	1	0	1	2	7
Alberta (Kleibrink) 🔨	1	0	0	1	0	0	1	0	2	0	0	5

Sheet C	1	2	3	4	5	6	7	8	9	10	Final
Newfoundland and Labrador (Devereaux) 🔨	1	0	1	0	2	0	0	0	X	X	4
Canada (Jones)	0	3	0	3	0	3	0	1	X	X	10

Sheet D	1	2	3	4	5	6	7	8	9	10	Final
Ontario (Homan)	0	1	0	0	2	0	1	0	1	X	5
Saskatchewan (Holland) 🔨	0	0	3	2	0	2	0	1	0	X	8

=== Draw 11 ===
Tuesday, February 22, 7:30 pm

Sheet A	1	2	3	4	5	6	7	8	9	10	Final
Northwest Territories/Yukon (Galusha) 🔨	1	0	2	0	1	0	0	2	1	X	7
Saskatchewan (Holland)	0	2	0	2	0	0	5	0	0	X	9

Sheet B	1	2	3	4	5	6	7	8	9	10	Final
New Brunswick (Kelly)	0	0	0	1	0	0	0	0	X	X	1
Ontario (Homan) 🔨	0	2	0	0	2	0	2	2	X	X	8

Sheet C	1	2	3	4	5	6	7	8	9	10	Final
Nova Scotia (Smith-Dacey) 🔨	0	0	3	0	0	0	0	0	0	0	3
Prince Edward Island (Birt)	2	0	0	0	0	1	0	1	1	1	6

Sheet D	1	2	3	4	5	6	7	8	9	10	Final
Alberta (Kleibrink)	0	1	0	1	0	2	0	1	1	0	6
Manitoba (Overton-Clapham) 🔨	1	0	1	0	1	0	1	0	0	1	5

=== Draw 12 ===
Wednesday, February 23, 9:30 am

Sheet A	1	2	3	4	5	6	7	8	9	10	Final
Canada (Jones)	1	0	1	0	0	2	0	3	0	X	7
Ontario (Homan) 🔨	0	1	0	1	1	0	1	0	0	X	4

Sheet B	1	2	3	4	5	6	7	8	9	10	Final
Saskatchewan (Holland) 🔨	0	3	1	2	0	3	1	X	X	X	10
Newfoundland and Labrador (Devereaux)	0	0	0	0	2	0	0	X	X	X	2

Sheet C	1	2	3	4	5	6	7	8	9	10	Final
Quebec (Larouche)	0	1	0	0	1	0	2	0	X	X	4
Alberta (Kleibrink) 🔨	3	0	2	1	0	2	0	1	X	X	9

Sheet D	1	2	3	4	5	6	7	8	9	10	Final
British Columbia (Scott) 🔨	1	0	0	1	0	0	0	1	0	1	4
Prince Edward Island (Birt)	0	0	1	0	0	1	0	0	1	0	3

=== Draw 13 ===
Wednesday, February 23, 2:30 pm

Sheet A	1	2	3	4	5	6	7	8	9	10	Final
Alberta (Kleibrink) 🔨	0	1	0	0	0	2	0	1	0	3	7
New Brunswick (Kelly)	0	0	0	1	1	0	1	0	0	0	3

Sheet B	1	2	3	4	5	6	7	8	9	10	11	Final
Northwest Territories/Yukon (Galusha) 🔨	0	0	0	1	0	0	1	2	0	2	1	7
Prince Edward Island (Birt)	0	1	0	0	3	0	0	0	2	0	0	6

Sheet C	1	2	3	4	5	6	7	8	9	10	Final
Ontario (Homan) 🔨	1	0	2	0	0	1	0	2	0	X	6
Manitoba (Overton-Clapham)	0	1	0	3	2	0	2	0	2	X	10

Sheet D	1	2	3	4	5	6	7	8	9	10	Final
Saskatchewan (Holland) 🔨	0	2	0	0	1	0	0	0	1	X	4
Nova Scotia (Smith-Dacey)	0	0	2	2	0	0	1	2	0	X	7

=== Draw 14 ===
Wednesday, February 23, 7:30 pm

Sheet A	1	2	3	4	5	6	7	8	9	10	Final
Nova Scotia (Smith-Dacey) 🔨	0	2	2	2	0	2	0	3	X	X	11
Newfoundland and Labrador (Devereaux)	1	0	0	0	1	0	1	0	X	X	3

Sheet B	1	2	3	4	5	6	7	8	9	10	Final
Manitoba (Overton-Clapham)	0	1	1	0	2	0	2	0	2	X	8
Canada (Jones) 🔨	2	0	0	1	0	1	0	1	0	X	5

Sheet C	1	2	3	4	5	6	7	8	9	10	Final
Northwest Territories/Yukon (Galusha)	0	0	1	0	0	0	0	1	X	X	2
British Columbia (Scott) 🔨	2	1	0	0	1	1	2	0	X	X	7

Sheet D	1	2	3	4	5	6	7	8	9	10	Final
Quebec (Larouche)	0	0	2	0	1	0	2	0	0	X	5
New Brunswick (Kelly) 🔨	1	1	0	1	0	1	0	3	1	X	8

=== Draw 15 ===
Thursday, February 24, 9:30 am

Sheet A	1	2	3	4	5	6	7	8	9	10	Final
Prince Edward Island (Birt) 🔨	0	1	1	1	0	1	3	0	0	1	8
Manitoba (Overton-Clapham)	1	0	0	0	1	0	0	2	1	0	5

Sheet B	1	2	3	4	5	6	7	8	9	10	Final
Alberta (Kleibrink) 🔨	0	0	2	1	2	0	1	0	1	0	7
Nova Scotia (Smith-Dacey)	2	1	0	0	0	1	0	2	0	2	8

Sheet C	1	2	3	4	5	6	7	8	9	10	Final
Saskatchewan (Holland) 🔨	1	0	1	0	1	2	0	1	0	1	7
New Brunswick (Kelly)	0	1	0	2	0	0	1	0	2	0	6

Sheet D	1	2	3	4	5	6	7	8	9	10	Final
Northwest Territories/Yukon (Galusha)	0	1	0	2	0	0	0	0	X	X	3
Ontario (Homan) 🔨	2	0	1	0	1	1	2	2	X	X	9

=== Draw 16 ===
Thursday, February 24, 2:30 pm

Sheet A	1	2	3	4	5	6	7	8	9	10	11	Final
Quebec (Larouche)	0	0	2	0	2	0	2	1	0	1	2	10
Northwest Territories/Yukon (Galusha) 🔨	1	1	0	2	0	2	0	0	2	0	0	8

Sheet B	1	2	3	4	5	6	7	8	9	10	Final
British Columbia (Scott) 🔨	0	1	0	1	0	0	1	0	1	2	6
New Brunswick (Kelly)	0	0	1	0	1	1	0	1	0	0	4

Sheet C	1	2	3	4	5	6	7	8	9	10	Final
Canada (Jones) 🔨	1	0	1	0	3	0	0	0	4	X	9
Nova Scotia (Smith-Dacey)	0	1	0	1	0	2	0	0	0	X	4

Sheet D	1	2	3	4	5	6	7	8	9	10	11	Final
Manitoba (Overton-Clapham) 🔨	0	2	2	1	0	1	0	0	1	0	1	8
Newfoundland and Labrador (Devereaux)	1	0	0	0	3	0	1	1	0	1	0	7

=== Draw 17 ===
Thursday, February 24, 7:30 pm

Sheet A	1	2	3	4	5	6	7	8	9	10	Final
Saskatchewan (Holland) 🔨	1	0	0	4	0	0	0	0	0	0	5
British Columbia (Scott)	0	1	0	0	1	1	1	1	1	2	8

Sheet B	1	2	3	4	5	6	7	8	9	10	Final
Ontario (Homan)	0	1	0	0	1	0	0	0	2	1	5
Quebec (Larouche) 🔨	1	0	0	1	0	0	1	1	0	0	4

Sheet C	1	2	3	4	5	6	7	8	9	10	Final
Prince Edward Island (Birt)	0	0	2	3	0	0	1	0	1	X	7
Newfoundland and Labrador (Devereaux) 🔨	0	1	0	0	1	2	0	1	0	X	5

Sheet D	1	2	3	4	5	6	7	8	9	10	Final
Canada (Jones) 🔨	2	2	1	0	1	0	1	1	0	X	8
Alberta (Kleibrink)	0	0	0	2	0	2	0	0	1	X	5

== Tiebreaker ==
Friday, February 25, 2:30 pm

Sheet C	1	2	3	4	5	6	7	8	9	10	Final
Nova Scotia (Smith-Dacey) 🔨	2	1	1	2	0	2	0	1	0	0	9
British Columbia (Scott)	0	0	0	0	2	0	2	0	2	2	8

Player percentages
Nova Scotia		British Columbia	
Teri Lake	85%	Jacquie Armstrong	86%
Blisse Comstock	84%	Sasha Carter	79%
Danielle Parsons	84%	Jeanna Schraeder	73%
Heather Smith-Dacey	83%	Kelly Scott	71%
Total	84%	Total	77%

== Playoffs ==
Page playoff system
1	Saskatchewan	9
2	Canada	10
3	Ontario	13
4	Nova Scotia	5

Semifinal
1	Saskatchewan	7
3	Ontario	5

Final
2	Canada	7
1	Saskatchewan	8
Bronze Medal Game
4	Nova Scotia	9
3	Ontario	7

=== 1 vs. 2 ===
Friday, February 25, 7:30 pm

Sheet C	1	2	3	4	5	6	7	8	9	10	11	Final
Saskatchewan (Holland) 🔨	2	0	1	0	2	0	0	2	0	2	0	9
Canada (Jones)	0	1	0	1	0	2	2	0	3	0	1	10

Player percentages
Saskatchewan		Canada	
Heather Kalenchuk	91%	Dawn Askin	83%
Tammy Schneider	67%	Jill Officer	70%
Kim Schneider	76%	Kaitlyn Lawes	77%
Amber Holland	70%	Jennifer Jones	71%
Total	76%	Total	76%

=== 3 vs. 4 ===
Saturday February 26, 12:00 pm

Sheet C	1	2	3	4	5	6	7	8	9	10	Final
Ontario (Homan) 🔨	0	0	2	0	5	0	2	0	4	X	13
Nova Scotia (Smith-Dacey)	0	1	0	1	0	1	0	2	0	X	5

Player percentages
Ontario		Nova Scotia	
Lisa Weagle	84%	Teri Lake	96%
Alison Kreviazuk	81%	Blisse Comstock	75%
Emma Miskew	85%	Danielle Parsons	88%
Rachel Homan	81%	Heather Smith-Dacey	69%
Total	82%	Total	82%

=== Semifinal ===
Saturday February 26, 5:00 pm

Sheet C	1	2	3	4	5	6	7	8	9	10	Final
Saskatchewan (Holland) 🔨	0	1	0	2	2	0	0	0	2	0	7
Ontario (Homan)	0	0	2	0	0	1	1	0	0	1	5

Player percentages
Saskatchewan		Ontario	
Heather Kalenchuk	86%	Lisa Weagle	83%
Tammy Schneider	90%	Alison Kreviazuk	78%
Kim Schneider	80%	Emma Miskew	79%
Amber Holland	82%	Rachel Homan	70%
Total	84%	Total	78%

=== Bronze Medal Game ===
Sunday, February 27, 2:30 pm

Sheet C	1	2	3	4	5	6	7	8	9	10	Final
Nova Scotia (Smith-Dacey)	0	0	0	3	1	0	2	0	3	0	9
Ontario (Homan) 🔨	0	1	2	0	0	1	0	1	0	2	7

Player percentages
Nova Scotia		Ontario	
Teri Lake	83%	Lisa Weagle	93%
Blisse Comstock	85%	Alison Kreviazuk	70%
Danielle Parsons	85%	Emma Miskew	73%
Heather Smith-Dacey	88%	Rachel Homan	68%
Total	85%	Total	76%

=== Final ===
Sunday, February 27, 7:30 pm

Sheet C	1	2	3	4	5	6	7	8	9	10	Final
Canada (Jones) 🔨	3	0	1	0	2	0	0	1	0	0	7
Saskatchewan (Holland)	0	2	0	1	0	3	0	0	1	1	8

Player percentages
Canada		Saskatchewan	
Dawn Askin	75%	Heather Kalenchuk	86%
Jill Officer	71%	Tammy Schneider	85%
Kaitlyn Lawes	83%	Kim Schneider	81%
Jennifer Jones	68%	Amber Holland	83%
Total	74%	Total	84%

== Statistics ==
=== Top 5 Player Percentages ===
Round robin only; minimum 6 games

Key
First All-Star Team
Second All-Star Team

Leads	%
(Canada) Dawn Askin	90
(Alberta) Chelsey Bell	86
(Ontario) Lisa Weagle	85
(Saskatchewan) Heather Kalenchuk	85
(Quebec) Véronique Brassard	84

Seconds	%
(Canada) Jill Officer	84
(Saskatchewan) Tammy Schneider	83
(Ontario) Alison Kreviazuk	82
(Alberta) Bronwen Webster	81
(Prince Edward Island) Robyn MacPhee	81

Thirds	%
(Canada) Kaitlyn Lawes	81
(Saskatchewan) Kim Schneider	80
(New Brunswick) Denise Nowlan	78
(Quebec) Annie Lemay	77
(Prince Edward Island) Shelly Bradley	76
(Ontario) Emma Miskew	76
(Alberta) Amy Nixon	76

Skips	%
(Canada) Jennifer Jones	83
(Saskatchewan) Amber Holland	79
(Ontario) Rachel Homan	79
(Alberta) Shannon Kleibrink	78
(British Columbia) Kelly Scott	75

== Awards ==
=== All-Star teams ===
First Team
Position	Name	Team
Skip	Jennifer Jones	Canada
Third	Kaitlyn Lawes	Canada
Second	Jill Officer	Canada
Lead	Dawn Askin	Canada

Second Team
Position	Name	Team
Skip	Amber Holland	Saskatchewan
Third	Kim Schneider	Saskatchewan
Second	Tammy Schneider	Saskatchewan
Lead	Chelsey Bell	Alberta

=== Marj Mitchell Sportsmanship Award ===
The Marj Mitchell Sportsmanship Award was presented to the player chosen by their fellow peers as the curler that most exemplified sportsmanship and dedication to curling during the annual Scotties Tournament of Hearts.

Name	Position	Team
Cathy Overton-Clapham	Skip	Manitoba

=== Sandra Schmirler Most Valuable Player Award ===
The Sandra Schmirler Most Valuable Player Award was awarded to the top player in the playoff round by members of the media in the Scotties Tournament of Hearts.

Name	Position	Team
Amber Holland	Skip	Saskatchewan

=== Joan Mead Builder Award ===
The Joan Mead Builder Award recognizes a builder in the sport of curling named in the honour of the late CBC curling producer Joan Mead.

Name	Contribution(s)
Elaine Dagg-Jackson	Canadian national team coach

=== Shot of the Week Award ===
The Shot of the Week Award was awarded to the curler who had been determined with the most outstanding shot during the tournament as voted on by TSN commentators.

Name	Position	Team
Amber Holland	Skip	Saskatchewan

== Provincial and territorial playdowns ==
- 2011 Alberta Scotties Tournament of Hearts
- 2011 British Columbia Scotties Tournament of Hearts
- 2011 Manitoba Scotties Tournament of Hearts
- 2011 New Brunswick Scotties Tournament of Hearts
- 2011 Newfoundland and Labrador Scotties Tournament of Hearts
- 2011 Nova Scotia Scotties Tournament of Hearts
- 2011 Ontario Scotties Tournament of Hearts
- 2011 Prince Edward Island Scotties Tournament of Hearts
- 2011 Quebec Scotties Tournament of Hearts
- 2011 Saskatchewan Scotties Tournament of Hearts
- (Northwest Territories) 2011 NWT/Yukon Scotties Tournament of Hearts
