= 2012 New Brunswick Scotties Tournament of Hearts =

- Host city: Oromocto, New Brunswick
- Arena: Gage Golf & Curling Club
- Dates: January 25–29
- Winner: Team Atkinson
- Curling club: Gage Golf and Curling Club
- Skip: Rebecca Atkinson
- Fourth: Andrea Kelly
- Second: Jillian Babin
- Lead: Jodie deSolla
- Finalist: Mary Jane McGuire

The 2012 New Brunswick Scotties Tournament of Hearts, New Brunswick's women's provincial curling championship, was held from January 25 to 29 at the Gage Golf & Curling Club in Oromocto, New Brunswick. The winning team of Rebecca Atkinson, represented New Brunswick at the 2012 Scotties Tournament of Hearts in Red Deer, Alberta, finishing with a 5-6 record.

== Teams ==
Skip	Third	Second	Lead	Club(s)
Melissa Adams	Jaclyn Crandall	Shannon Tatlock	Emily MacRae	Capital Winter Club, Fredericton
Sandy Comeau	Carol Whitaker	Stacey Leger	Jane Boyle	Curl Moncton, Moncton
Andrea Kelly (fourth)	Rebecca Atkinson (skip)	Jillian Babin	Jodie deSolla	Gage Golf and Curling Club, Oromocto
Mary Jane McGuire	Megan McGuire	Abby Burgess	Alice MacKay	Capital Winter Club, Fredericton
Marin McLeod	Brittani Jeans	Christina Moore	Katie Haley	Capital Winter Club, Fredericton
Sylvie Robichaud	Danielle Nicholson	Marie Richard	Kendra Lister	Curling Beauséjour Inc., Moncton
Jessica Ronalds	Sarah Ronalds	Heather Munn	Stephanie Taylor	Curl Moncton, Moncton
Kathleen Trites	Taryn Abernethy	Misty Hicks	Alyssa Patterson	Sackville Curling Club, Sackville

== Standings ==
Skip (Club)	W	L	PF	PA	Ends Won	Ends Lost	Blank Ends	Stolen Ends
Rebecca Atkinson (Gage)	6	1	53	35	35	25	5	13
Sylvie Robichaud (Curling Beauséjour Inc.)	6	1	58	30	25	25	8	8
Mary Jane McGuire (Capital Winter Club)	4	3	43	45	26	31	7	5
Jessica Ronalds (Curl Moncton)	3	4	48	46	30	31	2	8
Melissa Adams (Capital Winter Club)	3	4	45	44	28	24	3	7
Sandy Comeau (Curl Moncton)	2	5	39	51	27	29	6	8
Kathleen Trites (Sackville)	2	5	36	53	26	29	4	4
Marin McLeod (Capital Winter Club)	2	5	35	49	27	27	9	6

== Results ==
=== Draw 1 ===
January 25, 2:00 PM

Sheet 4	1	2	3	4	5	6	7	8	9	10	Final
Adams	0	0	0	2	0	2	0	1	1	0	6
Comeau	1	2	0	0	2	0	1	0	0	1	7

Sheet 5	1	2	3	4	5	6	7	8	9	10	Final
Trites	1	0	1	0	2	0	0	1	X	X	5
Robichaud	0	4	0	2	0	3	1	0	X	X	10

Sheet 6	1	2	3	4	5	6	7	8	9	10	Final
Ronalds	1	0	1	0	1	2	2	0	2	X	9
McGuire	0	1	0	2	0	0	0	2	0	X	5

Sheet 7	1	2	3	4	5	6	7	8	9	10	Final
McLeod	1	0	2	0	2	0	1	0	0	0	6
Atkinson	0	1	0	2	0	1	0	1	1	1	7

=== Draw 2 ===
January 25, 7:00 PM

Sheet 4	1	2	3	4	5	6	7	8	9	10	Final
Atkinson	0	2	0	3	1	0	2	0	1	X	9
Ronalds	1	0	1	0	0	1	0	2	0	X	5

Sheet 5	1	2	3	4	5	6	7	8	9	10	Final
McGuire	0	0	1	0	0	0	1	2	0	5	9
McLeod	0	1	0	0	1	1	0	0	1	0	4

Sheet 6	1	2	3	4	5	6	7	8	9	10	Final
Robichaud	3	0	1	0	1	0	3	1	X	X	9
Adams	0	1	0	0	0	2	0	0	X	X	3

Sheet 7	1	2	3	4	5	6	7	8	9	10	Final
Comeau	2	1	2	2	1	0	X	X	X	X	8
Trites	0	0	0	0	0	2	X	X	X	X	2

=== Draw 3 ===
January 26, 2:00 PM

Sheet 4	1	2	3	4	5	6	7	8	9	10	Final
McLeod	0	0	2	0	0	0	1	0	0	X	3
Robichaud	2	0	0	0	0	3	0	2	1	X	8

Sheet 5	1	2	3	4	5	6	7	8	9	10	Final
Ronalds	1	0	1	0	2	4	1	3	X	X	12
Comeau	0	2	0	1	0	0	0	0	X	X	3

Sheet 6	1	2	3	4	5	6	7	8	9	10	Final
Trites	0	0	0	0	1	0	1	0	1	0	3
Atkinson	0	2	1	1	0	2	0	1	0	0	7

Sheet 7	1	2	3	4	5	6	7	8	9	10	Final
Adams	0	2	0	2	3	2	3	X	X	X	12
McGuire	2	0	3	0	0	0	0	X	X	X	5

=== Draw 4 ===
January 26, 7:00 PM

Sheet 4	1	2	3	4	5	6	7	8	9	10	Final
McGuire	0	2	0	2	1	0	0	2	0	X	7
Trites	1	0	2	0	0	0	1	0	1	X	5

Sheet 5	1	2	3	4	5	6	7	8	9	10	Final
Atkinson	1	2	1	1	0	4	X	X	X	X	9
Adams	0	0	0	0	1	0	X	X	X	X	1

Sheet 6	1	2	3	4	5	6	7	8	9	10	Final
McLeod	0	0	1	0	2	0	2	2	0	1	8
Comeau	0	1	0	1	0	2	0	0	1	0	5

Sheet 7	1	2	3	4	5	6	7	8	9	10	Final
Ronalds	1	0	1	0	1	0	1	0	0	X	4
Robichaud	0	2	0	2	0	2	0	1	2	X	9

=== Draw 5 ===
January 27, 9:30 AM

Sheet 4	1	2	3	4	5	6	7	8	9	10	Final
Comeau	0	1	0	1	4	0	2	0	0	0	8
Atkinson	0	0	3	0	0	2	0	2	1	1	9

Sheet 5	1	2	3	4	5	6	7	8	9	10	11	Final
Trites	0	1	0	1	3	0	1	0	1	1	1	9
Ronalds	3	0	2	0	0	0	0	3	0	0	0	8

Sheet 6	1	2	3	4	5	6	7	8	9	10	Final
Robichaud	0	1	0	1	0	2	2	0	0	1	7
McGuire	1	0	1	0	1	0	0	0	1	0	4

Sheet 7	1	2	3	4	5	6	7	8	9	10	Final
Adams	0	5	0	0	2	2	X	X	X	X	9
McLeod	1	0	1	1	0	0	X	X	X	X	3

=== Draw 6 ===
January 27, 1:00 PM

Sheet 4	1	2	3	4	5	6	7	8	9	10	Final
Ronalds	0	0	0	2	0	1	0	2	1	2	8
Adams	1	1	1	0	2	0	1	0	0	0	6

Sheet 5	1	2	3	4	5	6	7	8	9	10	11	Final
Robichaud	1	1	0	0	0	2	0	0	2	0	0	6
Atkinson	0	0	1	2	0	0	0	1	0	2	1	7

Sheet 6	1	2	3	4	5	6	7	8	9	10	Final
Trites	0	0	4	0	2	0	0	2	1	X	9
McLeod	0	2	0	1	0	1	1	0	0	X	5

Sheet 7	1	2	3	4	5	6	7	8	9	10	Final
McGuire	2	0	0	0	0	1	3	0	1	X	7
Comeau	0	1	0	0	1	0	0	1	0	X	3

=== Draw 7 ===
January 28, 8:30 AM

Sheet 4	1	2	3	4	5	6	7	8	9	10	Final
Atkinson	0	1	0	2	0	0	1	0	1	0	5
McGuire	1	0	1	0	0	1	0	2	0	1	6

Sheet 5	1	2	3	4	5	6	7	8	9	10	Final
Adams	2	0	1	0	0	3	0	2	X	X	8
Trites	0	1	0	0	1	0	1	0	X	X	3

Sheet 6	1	2	3	4	5	6	7	8	9	10	Final
Comeau	0	0	2	1	0	0	1	0	1	X	5
Robichaud	0	1	0	0	2	2	0	2	0	X	7

Sheet 7	1	2	3	4	5	6	7	8	9	10	Final
McLeod	1	0	0	0	1	1	1	0	2	X	6
Ronalds	0	0	1	0	0	0	0	1	0	X	2

== Playoffs ==
Semifinal			Final
			1	Rebecca Atkinson	7
2	Sylvie Robichaud	3	3	Mary Jane McGuire	5
3	Mary Jane McGuire	4

=== Semifinal ===
January 28, 6:30 PM

Team	1	2	3	4	5	6	7	8	9	10	Final
Robichaud	1	0	1	0	0	0	0	1	0	0	3
McGuire	0	1	0	1	0	1	0	0	0	1	4

=== Final ===
January 29, 2:30 PM

Team	1	2	3	4	5	6	7	8	9	10	Final
Atkinson	1	0	1	0	0	1	1	3	0	X	7
McGuire	0	1	0	2	1	0	0	0	1	X	5

2012 New Brunswick Scotties Tournament of Hearts

Rebecca Atkinson
1st New Brunswick Provincial Championship title
