= 2019 New Brunswick Scotties Tournament of Hearts =

- Host city: Moncton, New Brunswick
- Arena: Curl Moncton
- Dates: January 23–27
- Winner: Team Crawford
- Curling club: Thistle St. Andrews Curling Club
- Skip: Andrea Crawford
- Third: Jillian Keough
- Second: Jennifer Armstrong
- Lead: Katie Forward
- Finalist: Sarah Mallais

The 2019 New Brunswick Scotties Tournament of Hearts, the provincial women's curling championship of New Brunswick, was held from January 23 to 27 at Curl Moncton in Moncton. The winning Andrea Crawford team represented New Brunswick at the 2019 Scotties Tournament of Hearts in Sydney, Nova Scotia, finishing with a 3–4 record. The event was held in conjunction with the 2019 NB Tankard, the provincial men's curling championship.

== Qualification ==
Qualification method	Berths	Qualifying team(s)
Prelims	8	Andrea Crawford; Samantha Crook; Sarah Mallais; Marin McLeod; Sylvie Robichaud

== Teams ==
The teams were listed as follows:

Skip	Third	Second	Lead	Alternate	Club
Andrea Crawford	Jillian Keough	Jennifer Armstrong	Katie Forward		Thistle St. Andrews Curling Club
Samantha Crook	Julia Hunter	Molli Ward	Kayla Russell		Sackville Curling Club
Sarah Mallais	Carol Whitaker	Leah Thompson	Jane Boyle	Shannon Tatlock	Curl Moncton
Marin McLeod	Katherine Sterling	Taryn Abernethy	Michelle Barclay	Darie Tardif	Capital Winter Club
Sylvie Robichaud	Melissa Adams	Nicole Arsenault Bishop	Kendra Lister	Jaclyn Crandall	Curl Moncton

== Round-robin standings ==
Key
Teams to Playoffs

Skip	W	L
Andrea Crawford	4	0
Sarah Mallais	2	2
Sylvie Robichaud	2	2
Samantha Crook	1	3
Marin McLeod	1	3

== Round-robin results ==
All draw times are listed in Atlantic Standard Time (UTC-04:00)

=== Draw 2 ===
Wednesday, January 23, 15:45

Sheet 3	1	2	3	4	5	6	7	8	9	10	Final
Marin McLeod	1	0	0	1	0	0	X	X	X	X	2
Sylvie Robichaud	0	3	4	0	3	1	X	X	X	X	11

Sheet 4	1	2	3	4	5	6	7	8	9	10	Final
Samantha Crook	0	0	0	3	0	0	3	0	4	X	10
Sarah Mallais	0	1	1	0	2	2	0	1	0	X	7

=== Draw 4 ===
Thursday, January 24, 09:00

Sheet 1	1	2	3	4	5	6	7	8	9	10	Final
Sarah Mallais	0	0	1	2	0	0	0	4	X	X	7
Marin McLeod	1	0	0	0	0	0	1	0	X	X	2

Sheet 2	1	2	3	4	5	6	7	8	9	10	Final
Andrea Crawford	2	0	2	0	3	1	2	X	X	X	10
Samantha Crook	0	1	0	1	0	0	0	X	X	X	2

=== Draw 6 ===
Thursday, January 24, 20:00

Sheet 3	1	2	3	4	5	6	7	8	9	10	Final
Samantha Crook	1	0	1	0	1	1	0	1	0	1	6
Marin McLeod	0	0	0	4	0	0	2	0	1	0	7

Sheet 4	1	2	3	4	5	6	7	8	9	10	Final
Andrea Crawford	0	0	2	0	2	0	1	0	1	X	6
Sylvie Robichaud	0	0	0	1	0	1	0	1	0	X	3

=== Draw 7 ===
Friday, January 25, 09:00

Sheet 1	1	2	3	4	5	6	7	8	9	10	Final
Marin McLeod	0	0	1	0	0	0	0	1	0	X	2
Andrea Crawford	0	0	0	1	2	2	1	0	4	X	10

Sheet 2	1	2	3	4	5	6	7	8	9	10	Final
Sylvie Robichaud	0	0	2	0	0	0	0	0	3	0	5
Sarah Mallais	0	0	0	2	0	0	1	1	0	2	6

=== Draw 9 ===
Friday, January 25, 20:00

Sheet 3	1	2	3	4	5	6	7	8	9	10	Final
Sarah Mallais	0	0	1	0	0	0	X	X	X	X	1
Andrea Crawford	2	1	0	1	3	1	X	X	X	X	8

Sheet 4	1	2	3	4	5	6	7	8	9	10	Final
Sylvie Robichaud	3	0	0	1	0	3	0	1	0	X	8
Samantha Crook	0	1	1	0	3	0	0	0	1	X	6

== Playoffs ==
Semifinal			Final
			1	Andrea Crawford	6
2	Sarah Mallais	9	2	Sarah Mallais	3
3	Sylvie Robichaud	7

=== Semifinal ===
Saturday, January 26, 20:00

Sheet 4	1	2	3	4	5	6	7	8	9	10	Final
Sarah Mallais	1	0	3	0	2	0	1	0	2	X	9
Sylvie Robichaud	0	3	0	2	0	2	0	0	0	X	7

=== Final ===
Sunday, January 27, 14:30

Sheet 4	1	2	3	4	5	6	7	8	9	10	Final
Andrea Crawford	1	1	0	0	1	0	1	0	0	2	6
Sarah Mallais	0	0	0	1	0	1	0	1	0	0	3

2019 New Brunswick Tournament of Hearts

Andrea Crawford
8th New Brunswick Provincial Championship title
