= Ashley Howard (curler) =

Canadian curler (born 1989)

Ashley Howard (born September 19, 1989) is a Canadian curler from Regina, Saskatchewan. She played third on Team Saskatchewan in the 2016 Scotties Tournament of Hearts and was the executive director of CurlSask, the governing body of curling in Saskatchewan.

== Career ==
=== Junior career ===
Born in Orillia, Ontario, Howard is the daughter of 2006 Olympic champion Russ Howard and Wendy Howard.

Howard played second for team New Brunswick at the 2006 Canadian Junior Curling Championship. Howard skipped the New Brunswick team of Jillian Babin, Melissa Menzies and Emily MacRae at the 2009 Canadian Junior Curling Championships, finishing the round robin with a record of 5-7.

=== Women's career ===
==== New Brunswick: 2009–2011 ====
The season after her Canadian Juniors appearance, Howard and her new rink of Jaclyn Crandall, Beverley Janes-Colpitts and Nicole McCann played in the 2010 New Brunswick Scotties Tournament of Hearts. After a 4–3 round robin record, her team beat Melissa Adams in the semi-final, but lost in the provincial final to Andrea Kelly (now Crawford). The next season, Howard, Crandall and a new front-end of Shannon Williams and Pam Nicol played in the 2011 New Brunswick Scotties Tournament of Hearts. The team had less success, finishing with a 2–5 record, missing the playoffs.

==== Manitoba: 2011–2013 ====
Howard moved to Manitoba in 2011, joining the Cathy Overton-Clapham rink as the team's second. The team found immediate success that season, winning their first Grand Slam event, the 2011 Curlers Corner Autumn Gold Curling Classic. They also made it to the semifinals of the 2011 Manitoba Lotteries Women's Curling Classic and lost in the finals of the 2012 Players' Championship. The team was not as successful at the 2012 Manitoba Scotties Tournament of Hearts, losing in a tiebreaker match to Lisa DeRiviere.

The team remained together for the next season, but failed to qualify for the playoffs in any of the Grand Slam events they entered. They also failed to reach the playoffs at the 2013 Manitoba Scotties Tournament of Hearts. That season, Howard found more success at the university level, throwing third rocks for the University of Manitoba team, skipped by Breanne Meakin. The team would win the 2013 CIS/CCA Curling Championships that year.

==== Saskatchewan: 2014–present ====
Howard would later move to Saskatchewan, joining the Michelle Englot rink as her second. The team would fail to qualify for the playoffs in their lone Slam of the season. Howard played in two Slams with Sherry Anderson that season, also failing to make the playoffs. Howard played in the 2015 Saskatchewan Scotties Tournament of Hearts with Englot. The team would make it all the way to the final before losing to Stefanie Lawton.

Howard joined the Jolene Campbell rink in 2015 as her third. The team only played in two World Curling Tour events in their first season together. However, they won the 2016 Saskatchewan Scotties Tournament of Hearts, going on to represent Saskatchewan at the 2016 Scotties Tournament of Hearts.

== Personal life ==
Howard was a senior marketing coordinator for Saskatchewan with KPMG. In April 2016, she became the executive director of CurlSask. She has a BBA Hon. in Marketing. She attended Moncton High School in Moncton, New Brunswick.
