= Denise Nowlan =

Canadian curler

- Curler
- Born: Denise Cormier; July 28, 1971 (age 55); Fredericton, New Brunswick, Canada

Team
- Curling club: Curl Moncton, Moncton, NB

Curling career
- Member Association: New Brunswick
- Hearts: 5 (1993, 2007, 2009, 2010, 2011)
- Top CTRS ranking: 34th (2009–10)

Denise Nowlan (born July 28, 1971, in Fredericton as Denise Cormier) is a Canadian curler from Moncton, New Brunswick. She is a five-time New Brunswick Scotties champion.

== Career ==
As a junior, Nowlan represented New Brunswick at two Canadian Junior Curling Championships and won the event in 1991. The team finished fifth at the 1991 World Junior Curling Championships.

Nowlan made her first Scotties appearance in 1993 playing lead for Nancy McConnery at the 1993 Scott Tournament of Hearts. The team included Sandy Comeau and Leanne Perron as well. They finished with a 2–9 record, only beating Newfoundland and Labrador and Quebec. Nowlan would not return to the national championship until 2007 where she played third for her former teammate Sandy Comeau. At the 2007 Scotties Tournament of Hearts, the team finished last with a 1–10 record.

Nowlan joined the Andrea Kelly rink the next season and the team won the 2009 New Brunswick Scotties Tournament of Hearts, Nowlan's third provincial title. The team finished in the middle of the pact at the 2009 Scotties Tournament of Hearts with a 5–6 record, settling for eighth place. Team Kelly won the 2010 provincial championship as well and had a repeat finish at the 2010 Scotties Tournament of Hearts finishing eighth once again with a 5–6 record. Nowlan won her fifth New Brunswick Scotties in 2011 again with the Kelly rink. The team would not have the same record as the past two years however, finishing eleventh out of twelve teams with a 3–8 record at the 2011 national championship.

== Personal life ==
Nowlan works as a Customer Service Associate for Air Canada.

== Teams ==
Season	Skip	Third	Second	Lead
1992–93	Nancy McConnery	Leanne Perron	Sandy Comeau	Denise Cormier
2004–05	Melissa Adams	Denise Nowlan	Monique Masse	Susie LeBlanc-Leger
2008–09	Andrea Kelly	Denise Nowlan	Jodie deSolla	Lianne Sobey
2009–10	Andrea Kelly	Denise Nowlan	Jillian Babin	Lianne Sobey
2010–11	Andrea Kelly	Denise Nowlan	Jillian Babin	Lianne Sobey
2016–17	Denise Nowlan	Leanne Richardson	Shelley Thomas	Lynn LeBlanc
