= 2011 Prince Edward Island Scotties Tournament of Hearts =

The 2011 Prince Edward Island Scotties Tournament of Hearts was held Jan. 27–31 in at the Cornwall Curling Club in Cornwall, Prince Edward Island. The winning team of Suzanne Birt defeated the defending champions, team Kathy O'Rourke and represented Prince Edward Island at the 2011 Scotties Tournament of Hearts in Charlottetown, Prince Edward Island. Birt's team finished the round robin with a record of 6–5, just missing the tiebreaker.

== Teams ==
Skip	Third	Second	Lead	Club
Shirley Berry	Sandy Hope	Shelley Ebbett	Arleen Harris	Cornwall Curling Club, Cornwall
Suzanne Birt	Shelly Bradley	Robyn MacPhee	Leslie MacDougall	Charlottetown Curling Club, Charlottetown
Donna Butler	Carolyn Coulson	Melissa Andrews	Jackie Reid	Cornwall Curling Club, Cornwall
Erin Carmody	Geri-Lynn Ramsay	Kathy O'Rourke (skip)	Tricia Affleck	Charlottetown Curling Club, Charlottetown
Tammy Dewar	Julie Moyaert	Darlene London	Gail Greene	Montague Curling Club, Montague
Kim Dolan	Rebecca Jean MacDonald	Sinead Dolan	Nancy Cameron	Charlottetown Curling Club, Charlottetown

== Standings ==
Skip (Club)	W	L
Suzanne Birt (Charlottetown Curling Club)	6	1
Kathy O'Rourke (Charlottetown Curling Club)	4	3
Kim Dolan (Charlottetown Curling Club)	3	3
Donna Butler (Cornwall Curling Club)	2	3
Shirley Berry (Cornwall Curling Club)	1	3
Tammy Dewar (Montague Curling Club)	0	3

== A event ==
Round of 16

Quarterfinals
Shirley Berry	6
Donna Butler	7
Tammy Dewar	3
Kim Dolan	8

Semifinals
Kathy O'Rourke	9
Donna Butler	6
Kim Dolan	5
Suzanne Birt	10

Finals
Kathy O'Rourke	4
Suzanne Birt	7

== B event ==
Round of 16

Quarterfinals
Tammy Dewar	8
Donna Butler	10
Shirley Berry	3
Kim Dolan	8

Semifinals
Donna Butler	5
Suzanne Birt	8
Kim Dolan	3
Kathy O'Rourke	7

Finals
Suzanne Birt	4
Kathy O'Rourke	6

== C event ==
Round of 16

Quarterfinals
Shirley Berry	7
Donna Butler	4
Tammy Dewar	1
Kim Dolan	8

Semifinals
Shirley Berry	1
Kathy O'Rourke	9
Kim Dolan	1
Suzanne Birt	8

Finals
Kathy O'Rourke	7
Suzanne Birt	8

== Playoffs ==
Championship 1			Championship 2
			1	Suzanne Birt
1	Suzanne Birt	7	1	Suzanne Birt
2	Kathy O'Rourke	3

== Results ==
=== Draw 1 ===
January 27, 6:00 PM

Sheet 2	1	2	3	4	5	6	7	8	9	10	Final
Berry	0	1	0	1	0	0	3	0	1	X	6
Butler	1	0	2	0	1	1	0	2	0	X	7

Sheet 4	1	2	3	4	5	6	7	8	9	10	Final
Dewar	0	0	1	1	0	0	1	0	0	X	3
Dolan	0	0	0	0	3	1	0	3	1	X	8

=== Draw 2 ===
January 28, 11:00 AM

Sheet 1	1	2	3	4	5	6	7	8	9	10	Final
O'Rourke	2	0	0	1	1	0	3	2	0	X	9
Butler	0	0	1	0	0	3	0	0	2	X	6

Sheet 2	1	2	3	4	5	6	7	8	9	10	Final
Dolan	0	2	0	2	0	0	0	1	0	X	5
Birt	2	0	2	0	2	1	1	0	2	X	10

=== Draw 3 ===
January 28, 4:00 PM

Sheet 1	1	2	3	4	5	6	7	8	9	10	Final
Berry	0	0	0	1	0	1	1	0	0	X	3
Dolan	3	0	1	0	1	0	0	1	2	X	8

Sheet 2	1	2	3	4	5	6	7	8	9	10	11	Final
Dewar	1	0	0	1	0	1	2	1	1	1	0	8
Butler	0	2	2	0	4	0	0	0	0	0	2	10

=== A Final ===
January 28, 4:00 PM

Sheet 3	1	2	3	4	5	6	7	8	9	10	Final
O'Rourke	0	0	1	0	0	1	0	0	2	X	4
Birt	0	1	0	1	1	0	3	1	0	X	7

=== Draw 4 ===
January 29, 1:30 PM

Sheet 3	1	2	3	4	5	6	7	8	9	10	Final
Butler	0	0	1	0	1	1	0	2	0	0	5
Birt	2	0	0	1	0	0	3	0	0	2	8

Sheet 4	1	2	3	4	5	6	7	8	9	10	Final
Dolan	0	0	0	1	0	2	0	0	X	X	3
O'Rourke	0	0	1	0	3	0	2	1	X	X	7

=== Draw 5 ===
January 29, 6:30 PM

Sheet 3	1	2	3	4	5	6	7	8	9	10	Final
Dolan	1	0	2	2	2	1	X	X	X	X	8
Dewar	0	1	0	0	0	0	X	X	X	X	1

Sheet 4	1	2	3	4	5	6	7	8	9	10	Final
Berry	0	0	3	1	0	0	1	0	1	1	7
Butler	0	2	0	0	0	1	0	1	0	0	4

=== B Final ===
January 29, 6:30 PM

Sheet 2	1	2	3	4	5	6	7	8	9	10	Final
Birt	0	0	0	2	0	0	0	2	0	0	4
O'Rourke	0	1	1	0	1	1	1	0	0	1	6

=== Draw 6 ===
January 30, 1:30 PM

Sheet 1	1	2	3	4	5	6	7	8	9	10	Final
Dolan	0	0	0	1	0	0	0	0	X	X	1
Birt	0	3	1	0	2	1	0	1	X	X	8

Sheet 2	1	2	3	4	5	6	7	8	9	10	Final
Berry	0	0	1	0	X	X	X	X	X	X	1
O'Rourke	4	1	0	4	X	X	X	X	X	X	9

=== C Final ===
January 30, 6:30 PM

Sheet 3	1	2	3	4	5	6	7	8	9	10	Final
O'Rourke	0	1	0	2	0	2	0	2	0	0	7
Birt	1	0	1	0	1	0	1	0	2	2	8

=== Championship Round 1 ===
January 31, 1:30 PM

Sheet 2	1	2	3	4	5	6	7	8	9	10	Final
O'Rourke	0	0	1	0	1	1	0	0	0	0	3
Birt **	0	1	0	1	0	0	1	1	0	3	7

=== Championship Round 2 ===
January 31, 6:30 PM

Sheet 3	1	2	3	4	5	6	7	8	9	10	Final
Birt											0
Birt											0

** O'Rourke must beat Birt twice in order to win the Championship
