= Jodie deSolla =

Canadian curler

- Curler
- Born: April 11, 1985 (age 41); Montreal, Quebec

Team
- Curling club: Gage G&CC, Oromocto, NB
- Skip: Sarah Mallais
- Third: Cathlia Ward
- Second: Jodie deSolla
- Lead: Jane Boyle

Curling career
- Hearts: 7 (2006, 2009, 2010, 2011, 2012, 2013, 2014)
- Top CTRS ranking: 19th (2005–06)
Medal record
Women's Curling
Representing Canada
World Junior Championships
Bronze medal – third place	2005 Pinerolo
Representing New Brunswick
Canada Winter Games
Bronze medal – third place	2003 Bathurst

Jodie deSolla (born April 11, 1985) is a Canadian curler from Fredericton, New Brunswick. She is the former lead for Andrea Crawford, out of the Gage Golf and Curling Club in Oromocto, New Brunswick. Currently, she plays second on Team Sarah Mallais.

Born in Montreal, Quebec, deSolla moved to New Brunswick.

== Career ==
=== Juniors ===
deSolla's first national experience came in 2002 at the Canadian Junior Curling Championships, where she would represent New Brunswick, playing second for Andrea Kelly. The team would finish round robin with a 6-6 record and a seventh-place finish.

deSolla would return to the Canadian Junior Curling Championships in 2004, where playing for Kelly, the team would improve on their previous record. They would finish round robin in third place with a 9-3 record. They would face Quebec's Marie Cantin in the semi-final, and after a close game would lose 5-6, and take home the bronze medal.

deSolla and the team would repeat as New Brunswick champions in 2005, and again at the Canadian Junior Curling Championships would finish round robin third with a 9-3 record. Her team would again meet Quebec and Cantin in the semi-final, this time defeating them 7-5. They would face Alberta's Desirée Robertson in the final, where they would win the game and the gold medal with a 9-6 final. At the 2005 World Junior Curling Championships, Kelly skipped Team Canada to a bronze medal.

In 2006 deSolla and Kelly were still eligible for Juniors, however she lost in her provincial championships.

=== 2006–2011 ===
After losing the junior provincial, the team entered the 2006 New Brunswick Scott Tournament of Hearts, where they would finish round robin with a first place 6-1 record, receiving a bye to the final. They would meet veteran Heidi Hanlon in the final, where the team would win 8-7 and the right to represent New Brunswick at the 2006 Scott Tournament of Hearts. At the Hearts, the team finished round robin with a 5–6 record.

At the 2009 New Brunswick Scotties Tournament of Hearts, the team would finish round robin undefeated, with a 7-0 record. They would defeat Mary Jane McGuire in the final to win her second Scotties title. At the 2009 Scotties Tournament of Hearts the team would again finish round robin with a 5-6 record.

deSolla would depart the team after the 2008-09 season. She would play as the alternate player for Kelly at the 2010 Scotties Tournament of Hearts. For a third straight appearance, would finish round robin with a 5-6 record.

deSolla would again be the alternate for Kelly at the 2011 Scotties Tournament of Hearts. The team would have their worst showing to date at the event, finishing round robin with a 3-8 record.

=== 2011–current ===
Following the 2010-11 curling season Kelly would make significant team changes. She would depart ways with longtime teammates, third Denise Nowlan and lead Lianne Sobey, bringing deSolla back as her new lead, and in a new move would add Rebecca Atkinson to skip the team. Although Atkinson became the new skip, Kelly would continue to throw fourth stones. This combination would work for the squad, and the team would finish first place in round robin, with a 6-1 record at the 2012 New Brunswick Scotties Tournament of Hearts. They would defeat Mary Jane McGuire in the final. At the 2012 Scotties Tournament of Hearts, the team would struggle at the event, finishing round robin with a 5-6 record.
