= Jeanette Murphy =

Canadian curler

Jeanette McLenaghan
- Curler
- Born: Jeanette Murphy; September 8, 1983 (age 43); Fredericton, New Brunswick

Curling career
- Member Association: New Brunswick
- Hearts: 2 (2007, 2012)
- Top CTRS ranking: 36th (2011–12)

Jeanette McLenaghan (née Murphy; born September 8, 1983) is a Canadian curler from Quispamsis, New Brunswick.

== Career ==
Murphy curled at the Canadian Junior Curling Championships in 2003 with her longtime teammate Rebecca Atkinson. She also curled at the Scotties Tournament of Hearts in 2007 & 2012.

== Personal life ==
Murphy is the sister of six time Nova Scotia champion curler, Jamie Murphy. She married in 2014 and had three children in 2016.
