= Curl Moncton =

Curling club in Moncton, New Brunswick

- Location: 80 Lockhart Ave. Moncton, New Brunswick, Canada

Information
- Established: 1881 (MCA)
- Club type: Dedicated Ice
- Curling Canada region: NBCA
- Sheets of ice: 10
- Rock colours: Blue and Yellow
- Website: curlmoncton.ca

Curl Moncton Inc. is a curling club in Moncton, New Brunswick.

== History ==
Curl Moncton traces its history back to the founding of the Moncton Curling Association (MCA) in 1881, and was located on Lower Lutz Street. The club was moved to Mechanic Street in 1903, but was destroyed in a fire in 1915. The club was then rebuilt on Lutz Street.

Curl Moncton itself was formed in 2011 when the Beaver Curling Club and the Curling Beauséjour merged. The MCA joined Curl Moncton in 2013, when Curl Moncton purchased its site on Lutz Street to gain access to equity. The move was controversial, as it involved evicting the Humanity Project, which had been using the facility to help house and feed the homeless population. Using the equity from the sale, the club was expanded from five sheets to ten in 2019 at the cost of $2.7 million. The City of Moncton granted $66,000 to the club to keep afloat during the COVID-19 pandemic. In 2022, the club only put in five sheets of ice, renting the other half of the ice shed to the Greater Moncton Pickelball Association.

The Beaver Curling Club was founded in 1946 by a number of members for the MCA, becoming the city's second curling club. The Beauséjour Curling Club (later renamed Curling Beauséjour) was built in 1957, planned by the Le Cercle Acadien organization. Discussions began to merge the clubs in 2009.

== Provincial champions ==
Teams from Moncton clubs have won the following men's and women's provincial championships:

=== Men's ===
Winners of the New Brunswick Tankard:

Year	Team	Club	Brier record
1929	Wendell MacDonald, Fred McAndrews, Ambrose Wheeler, Harold Lockhart	MCA	6–3 (bronze)
1950	Jimmy Vance, Lee Allanach, Ralph Lister, Ron Dickie	Beaver	2–7
1953	Ralph Noble, Horace Trites, Albert Eagles, Harris Mitton	Beaver	2–8
1954	Richard McCully, Wilfred Taylor, Cecil McManus, Ralph Harley	Beaver	4–6
1956	Ralph Lister, Horace Trites, Jimmy Vance, Ralph Patterson	Beaver	3–7
1958	Jimmy Vance, Gordon Clogg, Harry Flemming, Don Mix	Beaver	2–8
1959	Richard McCully, Cecil McManus, Edward Shutt, Irving Mitten	Beaver	3–7
1960	Harold Mabey Sr., Harold Mabey Jr., Harold Keith, Ronald Lewis	MCA	2–8
1962	Harold Mabey Sr., Harold Mabey Jr., Harold Keith, Robert Puddester	MCA	5–5
1963	Don Mix, Raymond Gingles, Robert Boby, James Macelwain	Beaver	3–7
1964	Harold Mabey Jr., David Silliphant, Harold Keith, Harold Mabey Sr.	MCA	3–7
1965	Peter Lyons, Kenneth Little, Raymond Gould, Joseph Carey	Beauséjour	2–8
1969	Harold Mabey Jr., Ed Steeves, Harold Keith, Grant MacMellon	MCA	3–7
1970	Harold Mabey Jr., Ed Steeves, Harold Keith, Grant MacMellon	MCA	4–6
1971	Paul Bordage, Art Gillard, Dale Somers, Murray Leger	Beauséjour	3–7
1981	Tony Richardson, Bruce Forster, Gord Johnson, Don Mix	Beaver	3–8
1985	Bryan Wight, Bob Carruthers, Serge Denis, Cy Sutherland	Beaver	3–8
1991	Gary Mitchell, Grant Odishaw, Rick Perron, Mike Butler	Beaver	4–7
1996	Mike Kennedy, Grant Odishaw, Marc LeCocq, Rick Perron	Beaver	5–6
1998	Terry Odishaw, Tommy Sullivan, Mark Dobson, Kevin Keefe	MCA	4–7
1999	Russ Howard, Wayne Tallon, Rick Perron, Grant Odishaw	Beaver	8–5
2000	Russ Howard, Wayne Tallon, Rick Perron, Grant Odishaw	Beaver	9–5 (silver)
2002	Russ Howard, James Grattan, Marc LeCocq, Grant Odishaw	Beaver	8–5 (bronze)
2003	Russ Howard, James Grattan, Marc LeCocq, Grant Odishaw	Beaver	7–5
2004	Russ Howard, James Grattan, Marc LeCocq, Grant Odishaw	Beaver	7–5
2012	Terry Odishaw, Andy McCann, Scott Jones, Grant Odishaw	Curl Moncton	5–6
2019	Terry Odishaw, Jordan Pinder, Marc LeCocq, Grant Odishaw	Curl Moncton	3–4
2023	Jeremy Mallais (Fourth), Scott Jones (Skip), Brian King, Jared Bezanson	Curl Moncton	1–7

=== Women's ===
Winners of the New Brunswick Scotties Tournament of Hearts:

Year	Team	Club	Hearts record
1947	Miss M. M. Fryers, Mrs. W. R. Colpitts, Mrs. R. S. Johnstone, Mrs. A. W. Ross	Beaver	—
1952	Mrs. R. S. Johnstone, Mrs. L. A. Pinder, Mrs. J. E. Surette, Mrs. P. A. Clark	Beaver	—
1953	Mrs. R. S. Johnstone, Mrs. P. A. Clark, Mrs. L. A. Pinder, Mrs. J. E. Surette	Beaver	—
1955	Polly Clogg, Mrs. E. A. Willis, Harriet Stratton, Mabel DeWare	Beaver	—
1959	Mona Comeau, Kay Cormack, Vera Shutt, Evelyn Brooks	Beaver	—
1960	Mona Comeau, Kay Cormack, Vera Shutt, Evelyn Brooks	Beaver	—
1961	Mona Comeau, Kay Cormack, Vera Shutt, Evelyn Brooks	Beaver	7–3 (silver)
1962	Phyliss Pinder, Pauline Thomas, Jean Dick, Eleanor Steeves	MCA	4–5
1963	Mabel DeWare, Harriet Stratton, Forbis Stevenson, Marjorie Fraser	Beaver	8–1 (gold)
1969	Phyllis Chapman, Dorothy Thompson, Mary Cooper, Felice Willden	Beaver	3–6
1980	Denise Lavigne, Marie-Anne Vautour, Bonnie Anne Rayworth, Susan Goulet	Beauséjour	4–6
1993	Nancy McConnery, Leanne Perron, Sandy Comeau, Denise Cormier	Beaver	2–9
2005	Sandy Comeau, Stacey Leger, Allison Farrell, Sandi Prosser	Beaver	7–6
2007	Sandy Comeau, Denise Nowlan, Marie-Anne Power, Jeanette Murphy	Beaver	1–10
2008	Sylvie Robichaud, Danielle Nicholson, Marie Richard, Julie Carrier	Beauséjour	1–10
2015	Sylvie Robichaud, Rebecca Atkinson, Marie Richard, Jane Boyle	Curl Moncton	4–7
2016	Sylvie Robichaud, Rebecca Atkinson, Marie Richard, Jane Boyle	Curl Moncton	2–9
2018	Sylvie Robichaud, Melissa Adams, Nicole Arsenault Bishop, Kendra Lister	Curl Moncton	5–3

== National champions ==
Teams from Moncton clubs have won the following national championships:

Event	Year	Team	Club
Women's	1963	Mabel DeWare, Harriet Stratton, Forbis Stevenson, Marjorie Fraser	Beaver
Mixed	1994	Grant Odishaw, Heather Smith, Rick Perron, Krista Smith	Beaver
Club	2022	Shaelyn Park, Krista Flanagan Lynn LeBlanc, Shannon Tatlock	Curl Moncton
