= Lianne Sobey =

Canadian curler

Medal record

Curling

World Junior Championships
Bronze medal – third place	2005	

Lianne Sobey is a Canadian curler from New Brunswick. She plays lead for Andrea Kelly.

She won the 2005 Canadian Junior Curling Championships with Kelly, and then a bronze medal at the 2005 World Junior Curling Championships. Sobey won the 2009 New Brunswick Scotties Tournament of Hearts with Kelly.
