= 2016 New Brunswick Scotties Tournament of Hearts =

- Host city: Moncton, New Brunswick
- Arena: Curl Moncton
- Dates: January 27–31
- Winner: Team Robichaud
- Curling club: Curl Moncton
- Skip: Sylvie Robichaud
- Third: Rebecca Atkinson
- Second: Marie Richard
- Lead: Jane Boyle
- Alternate: Nicole Arsenault Bishop
- Finalist: Melissa Adams

The 2016 New Brunswick Scotties Tournament of Hearts, the provincial women's curling championship of New Brunswick was held January 27 to 31 at Curl Moncton in Moncton. The winning Sylvie Robichaud team represented New Brunswick at the 2016 Scotties Tournament of Hearts in Grande Prairie, Alberta.

== Teams ==
The teams are listed as follows:

Skip	Third	Second	Lead	Alternate	Club(s)
Melissa Adams	Jennifer Armstrong	Cathlia Ward	Kendra Lister	Katie Forward	Capital Winter Club, Fredericton
Shelly Graham	Anna Brinson	Connie Nichol	Jane McGinn	Abby Giberson	Capital Winter Club, Fredericton
Sarah Mallais	Stacey McCormack Lacey	Carol Whitaker	Leah Thompson		Thistle-St. Andrew's Curling Club, Saint John
Sylvie Robichaud	Rebecca Atkinson	Marie Richard	Jane Boyle	Nicole Arsenault Bishop	Curl Moncton, Moncton
Shannon Tatlock	Abby Burgess	Emily MacRae	Shelby Wilson		Curl Moncton, Moncton

== Round robin standings ==
Key
Teams to Playoffs

Team	W	L
Sylvie Robichaud	3	1
Melissa Adams	3	1
Sarah Mallais	2	2
Shannon Tatlock	2	2
Shelly Graham	0	4

== Scores ==
=== January 27 ===
Draw 1

- Robichaud 8-4 Mallais
- Tatlock 10-2 Graham

=== January 28 ===
Draw 2

- Robichaud 10-3 Graham
- Adams 10-3 Mallais

Draw 3

- Adams 11-3 Graham
- Tatlock 8-7 Robichaud

=== January 29 ===
Draw 4

- Adams 8-4 Tatlock
- Mallais 8-3 Graham

Draw 5

- Mallais 8-3 Tatlock
- Robichaud 9-8 Adams

== Playoffs ==
Page playoff system
1	Sylvie Robichaud	5
2	Melissa Adams	4
3	Sarah Mallais	7
4	Shannon Tatlock	5

Semifinal
2	Melissa Adams	12
3	Sarah Mallais	4

Final
1	Sylvie Robichaud	7
2	Melissa Adams	6

== 1 vs 2 ==
Saturday, January 30, 1:30 pm

Team	1	2	3	4	5	6	7	8	9	10	Final
Sylvie Robichaud	0	1	0	2	0	0	0	1	0	1	5
Melissa Adams	0	0	1	0	1	0	0	0	2	0	4

== 3 vs 4 ==
Saturday, January 30, 1:30 pm

Team	1	2	3	4	5	6	7	8	9	10	11	Final
Shannon Tatlock	2	0	1	0	0	1	0	0	1	0	0	5
Sarah Mallais	0	1	0	1	0	0	1	1	0	1	2	7

== Semifinal ==
Saturday, January 30, 6:30 pm

Team	1	2	3	4	5	6	7	8	9	10	Final
Melissa Adams	2	0	2	0	2	0	3	3	X	X	12
Sarah Mallais	0	1	0	2	0	1	0	0	X	X	4

== Final ==
Sunday, January 31, 12:30 pm

Team	1	2	3	4	5	6	7	8	9	10	Final
Sylvie Robichaud	0	1	0	0	2	0	4	0	0	X	7
Melissa Adams	0	0	2	0	0	1	0	1	2	X	6

2016 New Brunswick Scotties Tournament of Hearts

Sylvie Robichaud
3rd New Brunswick Provincial Championship title
