= Shannon Tatlock =

Canadian curler

- Curler
- Born: Shannon Williams; March 15, 1984 (age 42); Moncton, New Brunswick

Team
- Curling club: Curl Moncton, Moncton, NB
- Skip: Shaelyn Park
- Third: Krista Flanagan
- Second: Lynn LeBlanc
- Lead: Shannon Tatlock
- Mixed doubles partner: Damien Lahiton

Curling career
- Member Association: New Brunswick
- Top CTRS ranking: 67th (2014–15)

Shannon Tatlock (born March 15, 1984, as Shannon Williams) is a Canadian curler from Moncton, New Brunswick. She currently plays lead on Team Shaelyn Park with whom she won the 2022 Canadian Curling Club Championships.

== Career ==
Tatlock competed in three Canadian Curling Club Championships in 2011, 2012 and 2014. She skipped the team at all three of her appearances with her best finish being 4–2 in both 2011 and 2014. She has won two events on the World Curling Tour, the 2010 Lady Monctonian Invitational Spiel and the 2011 Rodd Curling Classic.

Tatlock made the playoffs at provincials for the first time at the 2015 New Brunswick Scotties Tournament of Hearts where she lost in the semifinal to Melissa Adams. She made the playoffs the following year as well, but lost in the 3 vs 4 page playoff game. Tatlock would join the Sarah Mallais rink as their alternate for the 2018–19 season. Team Mallais would make it to the final of the 2019 New Brunswick Scotties Tournament of Hearts where they lost 6–3 to the Andrea Crawford rink.

== Personal life ==
Tatlock has one child and is a former teacher, who now works as a Financial Advisor at her father's company, Kevin R Williams Financial Services Inc. She obtained her Certified Financial Planner designation in June 2017 and her Chartered Life Underwriter designation in June 2020. She is also the president of Red Sky Financial.

== Teams ==
Season	Skip	Third	Second	Lead	Alternate
2009–10	Jessica Ronalds	Shannon Williams	Stephanie Taylor	Michelle Majeau	
2010–11	Ashley Howard	Jaclyn Crandall	Shannon Williams	Pam Nicol	
2011–12	Melissa Adams	Jaclyn Crandall	Shannon Tatlock	Emily MacRae	
2012–13	Jessica Ronalds	Shannon Tatlock	Sarah Ronalds	Stephanie Taylor	
2013–14	Melissa Adams	Jaclyn Crandall	Abby Burgess	Shelby Wilson	Shannon Tatlock
2014–15	Shannon Tatlock	Jaclyn Crandall	Shelby Wilson	Emily MacRae	
2015–16	Shannon Tatlock	Abby Burgess	Emily MacRae	Shelby Wilson	
2016–17	Shannon Tatlock	Sandy Comeau	Emily MacRae	Shelby Wilson	
2017–18	Shannon Tatlock	Sandy Comeau	Shelley Thomas	Lynn LeBlanc	
2018–19	Sarah Mallais	Carol Whitaker	Leah Thompson	Jane Boyle	Shannon Tatlock
2022–23	Shaelyn Park	Krista Flanagan	Lynn LeBlanc	Shannon Tatlock	
2023–24	Shaelyn Park	Krista Flanagan	Lynn LeBlanc	Shannon Tatlock	
