= 2008 Scotties Tournament of Hearts =

- Host city: Regina, Saskatchewan
- Arena: Brandt Centre
- Dates: February 16–24
- Attendance: 97,617
- Winner: Manitoba
- Curling club: St. Vital CC, Winnipeg
- Skip: Jennifer Jones
- Third: Cathy Overton-Clapham
- Second: Jill Officer
- Lead: Dawn Askin
- Alternate: Jennifer Clark-Rouire
- Coach: Janet Arnott
- Finalist: Alberta (Shannon Kleibrink)

The 2008 Scotties Tournament of Hearts, Canada's national women's curling tournament was held February 16–24, 2008 at the Brandt Centre in Regina, Saskatchewan. The winner was the 2005 champion team from Manitoba, under skip Jennifer Jones. In winning, they became the first team since Kelley Law's rink from B.C. in 2000 to win the championship after playing a tie-breaker game.

== Teams ==
The teams were listed as follows:

Team Canada	Alberta	British Columbia
Kelowna CC, Kelowna Skip: Kelly Scott; Third: Jeanna Schraeder; Second: Sasha Carter; Lead: Renee Simons; Alternate: Michelle Allen	Calgary WC, Calgary Skip: Shannon Kleibrink; Third: Amy Nixon; Second: Bronwen Saunders; Lead: Chelsey Bell; Alternate: Nikki Smith	Kamloops CC, Kamloops Skip: Allison MacInnes; Third: Karla Sparks; Second: Janelle Yardley; Lead: Amanda Brennan; Alternate: Sandra Jenkins
Manitoba	New Brunswick	Newfoundland and Labrador
St. Vital CC, Winnipeg Skip: Jennifer Jones; Third: Cathy Overton-Clapham; Second: Jill Officer; Lead: Dawn Askin; Alternate: Jennifer Clark-Rouire	Curling Beauséjour, Moncton Skip: Sylvie Robichaud; Third: Danielle Nicholson; Second: Marie Richard; Lead: Julie Carrier; Alternate: Stacey Leger	RE/MAX Centre, St. John's Skip: Heather Strong; Third: Cathy Cunningham; Second: Laura Strong; Lead: Peg Goss; Alternate: Bobbie Sauder
Nova Scotia	Ontario	Prince Edward Island
Mayflower CC, Halifax Fourth: Mary-Anne Arsenault; Third: Kim Kelly; Second: Laine Peters; Skip: Nancy Delahunt; Alternate: Cheryl McBain	Coldwater & District CC, Coldwater Skip: Sherry Middaugh; Third: Kirsten Wall; Second: Kim Moore; Lead: Andra Harmark; Alternate: Tara George	Charlottetown CC, Charlottetown Skip: Suzanne Gaudet; Third: Robyn MacPhee (Note: For Draw 11, Team Prince Edward Island alternate Kim Dolan threw third stones while third Robyn MacPhee sat out.); Second: Carol Webb; Lead: Stefanie Clark; Alternate: Kim Dolan
Quebec	Saskatchewan	Northwest Territories/Yukon
CC Etchemin, Saint-Romuald Skip: Marie-France Larouche; Third: Nancy Bélanger; Second: Annie Lemay; Lead: Joëlle Sabourin; Alternate: Valérie Grenier	Tartan CC, Regina Skip: Michelle Englot; Third: Darlene Kidd; Second: Roberta Materi; Lead: Cindy Simmons; Alternate: Lorie Kehler	Yellowknife CC, Yellowknife Skip: Kerry Galusha (Note: Beginning with Draw 9, Team Northwest Territories/Yukon skip Kerry Galusha threw third stones while third Teejay Surik throw fourth stones.); Third: Teejay Surik; Second: Dawn Moses (Note: For Draws 8 and 9, Team Northwest Territories/Yukon alternate Shona Barbour threw second stones while second Dawn Moses sat out.); Lead: Heather McCagg-Nystrom; Alternate: Shona Barbour

== Map of teams ==
Team Canada Provincial Winners

== Round robin standings ==
Final round robin standings

Key
Teams to Playoffs
Teams to Tiebreakers

Locale	Skip	W	L	W–L	PF	PA	EW	EL	BE	SE	S%
Alberta	Shannon Kleibrink	10	1	–	89	56	51	40	12	16	84%
Ontario	Sherry Middaugh	9	2	–	92	58	50	41	12	16	80%
Quebec	Marie-France Larouche	8	3	–	89	67	45	45	10	9	80%
Manitoba	Jennifer Jones	7	4	1–0	78	65	49	44	6	17	83%
Newfoundland and Labrador	Heather Strong	7	4	0–1	78	77	53	46	11	14	79%
Nova Scotia	Mary-Anne Arsenault	6	5	–	75	76	46	49	11	12	80%
Saskatchewan	Michelle Englot	5	6	1–0	64	68	45	42	9	17	77%
Canada	Kelly Scott	5	6	0–1	70	73	43	44	15	14	83%
British Columbia	Allison MacInnes	4	7	–	70	74	43	49	11	10	74%
Prince Edward Island	Suzanne Gaudet	3	8	–	60	82	40	51	6	6	76%
Northwest Territories/Yukon	Kerry Galusha	1	10	1–0	59	92	45	52	5	13	73%
New Brunswick	Sylvie Robichaud	1	10	0–1	57	93	41	48	12	10	73%

== Round Robin results ==
All draw times are listed in Central Time (UTC−06:00).

=== Draw 1 ===
Saturday, February 16, 2:30 pm

Sheet A	1	2	3	4	5	6	7	8	9	10	Final
Ontario (Middaugh)	0	2	1	2	0	0	2	0	2	X	9
Canada (Scott) 🔨	2	0	0	0	3	0	0	0	0	X	5

Sheet B	1	2	3	4	5	6	7	8	9	10	Final
New Brunswick (Robichaud) 🔨	0	1	0	0	2	0	1	0	0	X	4
Nova Scotia (Arsenault)	2	0	1	0	0	3	0	1	1	X	8

Sheet C	1	2	3	4	5	6	7	8	9	10	Final
Prince Edward Island (Gaudet)	0	0	1	0	0	0	1	0	0	X	2
Manitoba (Jones) 🔨	2	0	0	1	1	1	0	1	2	X	8

Sheet D	1	2	3	4	5	6	7	8	9	10	Final
Quebec (Larouche) 🔨	0	1	0	2	0	3	0	0	3	X	9
Saskatchewan (Englot)	0	0	1	0	1	0	3	1	0	X	6

=== Draw 2 ===
Saturday, February 16, 7:00 pm

Sheet A	1	2	3	4	5	6	7	8	9	10	Final
Manitoba (Jones) 🔨	3	0	0	0	3	0	0	3	1	X	10
New Brunswick (Robichaud)	0	1	0	1	0	1	1	0	0	X	4

Sheet B	1	2	3	4	5	6	7	8	9	10	Final
Northwest Territories/Yukon (Galusha)	0	0	0	1	1	1	0	1	0	0	4
Newfoundland and Labrador (Strong) 🔨	0	0	1	0	0	0	2	0	1	1	5

Sheet C	1	2	3	4	5	6	7	8	9	10	Final
Alberta (Kleibrink)	0	0	0	0	0	1	1	0	3	1	6
British Columbia (MacInnes) 🔨	0	0	1	1	0	0	0	2	0	0	4

Sheet D	1	2	3	4	5	6	7	8	9	10	Final
Prince Edward Island (Gaudet) 🔨	0	2	0	0	2	1	0	4	X	X	9
Nova Scotia (Arsenault)	0	0	2	0	0	0	1	0	X	X	3

=== Draw 3 ===
Sunday, February 17, 9:30 am

Sheet B	1	2	3	4	5	6	7	8	9	10	Final
Saskatchewan (Englot) 🔨	0	1	0	0	1	1	0	0	1	X	4
Ontario (Middaugh)	0	0	0	2	0	0	2	3	0	X	7

Sheet C	1	2	3	4	5	6	7	8	9	10	Final
Quebec (Larouche) 🔨	0	2	0	0	0	2	0	0	0	X	4
Canada (Scott)	3	0	0	1	1	0	2	0	1	X	8

=== Draw 4 ===
Sunday, February 17, 2:00 pm

Sheet A	1	2	3	4	5	6	7	8	9	10	Final
Newfoundland and Labrador (Strong) 🔨	0	0	2	0	1	0	0	1	0	0	4
Alberta (Kleibrink) 🔨	0	0	0	3	0	1	0	0	0	2	6

Sheet B	1	2	3	4	5	6	7	8	9	10	11	Final
Nova Scotia (Arsenault) 🔨	0	0	3	0	0	0	1	1	0	0	1	6
Manitoba (Jones)	1	1	0	1	1	0	0	0	0	1	0	5

Sheet C	1	2	3	4	5	6	7	8	9	10	Final
New Brunswick (Robichaud) 🔨	1	1	0	4	0	3	X	X	X	X	9
Prince Edward Island (Gaudet)	0	0	1	0	1	0	X	X	X	X	2

Sheet D	1	2	3	4	5	6	7	8	9	10	Final
Northwest Territories/Yukon (Galusha) 🔨	0	1	0	0	1	0	2	0	X	X	4
British Columbia (MacInnes)	2	0	2	1	0	2	0	3	X	X	10

=== Draw 5 ===
Sunday, February 17, 7:00 pm

Sheet A	1	2	3	4	5	6	7	8	9	10	Final
Canada (Scott) 🔨	0	1	0	0	2	1	2	0	0	0	6
Saskatchewan (Englot)	2	0	1	1	0	0	0	0	2	2	8

Sheet B	1	2	3	4	5	6	7	8	9	10	Final
Alberta (Kleibrink) 🔨	0	4	0	2	1	0	0	0	1	X	8
Northwest Territories/Yukon (Galusha)	1	0	1	0	0	1	1	1	0	X	5

Sheet C	1	2	3	4	5	6	7	8	9	10	Final
British Columbia (MacInnes) 🔨	3	0	0	2	0	1	0	0	1	0	7
Newfoundland and Labrador (Strong)	0	1	1	0	2	0	0	2	0	3	9

Sheet D	1	2	3	4	5	6	7	8	9	10	Final
Ontario (Middaugh) 🔨	0	0	3	1	0	1	1	0	1	0	7
Quebec (Larouche)	0	3	0	0	1	0	0	3	0	1	8

=== Draw 6 ===
Monday, February 18, 9:30 am

Sheet A	1	2	3	4	5	6	7	8	9	10	Final
Quebec (Larouche) 🔨	2	0	1	0	2	0	3	0	0	X	8
Prince Edward Island (Gaudet)	0	2	0	1	0	1	0	2	1	X	7

Sheet B	1	2	3	4	5	6	7	8	9	10	Final
Saskatchewan (Englot) 🔨	2	0	1	0	1	1	0	0	5	X	10
New Brunswick (Robichaud)	0	1	0	2	0	0	1	1	0	X	5

Sheet C	1	2	3	4	5	6	7	8	9	10	Final
Ontario (Middaugh) 🔨	1	0	1	0	1	3	0	3	2	X	11
Manitoba (Jones)	0	1	0	1	0	0	2	0	0	X	4

Sheet D	1	2	3	4	5	6	7	8	9	10	Final
Canada (Scott) 🔨	0	1	0	0	0	0	2	2	0	0	5
Nova Scotia (Arsenault)	0	0	1	4	1	0	0	0	0	1	7

=== Draw 7 ===
Monday, February 18, 2:00 pm

Sheet A	1	2	3	4	5	6	7	8	9	10	Final
New Brunswick (Robichaud) 🔨	1	0	2	0	1	0	0	2	0	X	6
British Columbia (MacInnes)	0	3	0	1	0	3	1	0	5	X	13

Sheet B	1	2	3	4	5	6	7	8	9	10	11	Final
Prince Edward Island (Gaudet) 🔨	1	0	3	0	2	0	1	1	0	0	0	8
Newfoundland and Labrador (Strong)	0	2	0	2	0	2	0	0	1	1	1	9

Sheet C	1	2	3	4	5	6	7	8	9	10	Final
Nova Scotia (Arsenault) 🔨	1	0	2	0	2	0	0	0	2	0	7
Alberta (Kleibrink)	0	1	0	1	0	2	3	1	0	1	9

Sheet D	1	2	3	4	5	6	7	8	9	10	Final
Manitoba (Jones) 🔨	1	1	2	2	1	0	1	0	X	X	8
Northwest Territories/Yukon (Galusha)	0	0	0	0	0	1	0	1	X	X	2

=== Draw 8 ===
Monday, February 18, 7:00 pm

Sheet A	1	2	3	4	5	6	7	8	9	10	Final
Northwest Territories/Yukon (Galusha) 🔨	0	0	1	1	0	1	0	1	X	X	4
Ontario (Middaugh)	1	3	0	0	3	0	2	0	X	X	9

Sheet B	1	2	3	4	5	6	7	8	9	10	Final
Alberta (Kleibrink) 🔨	2	0	1	1	2	0	0	0	3	X	9
Canada (Scott)	0	1	0	0	0	0	1	2	0	X	4

Sheet C	1	2	3	4	5	6	7	8	9	10	Final
Newfoundland and Labrador (Strong) 🔨	2	0	3	0	0	3	0	2	0	1	11
Quebec (Larouche)	0	2	0	1	1	0	2	0	2	0	8

Sheet D	1	2	3	4	5	6	7	8	9	10	Final
British Columbia (MacInnes) 🔨	0	1	0	0	0	0	0	0	2	0	3
Saskatchewan (Englot)	0	0	1	0	1	0	1	1	0	1	5

=== Draw 9 ===
Tuesday, February 19, 9:30 am

Sheet A	1	2	3	4	5	6	7	8	9	10	Final
Newfoundland and Labrador (Strong) 🔨	0	0	1	0	2	0	0	0	1	X	4
Canada (Scott)	1	1	0	2	0	2	0	2	0	X	8

Sheet B	1	2	3	4	5	6	7	8	9	10	Final
British Columbia (MacInnes) 🔨	0	0	1	0	1	0	1	2	0	1	6
Ontario (Middaugh)	0	1	0	2	0	2	0	0	2	0	7

Sheet C	1	2	3	4	5	6	7	8	9	10	Final
Northwest Territories/Yukon (Galusha) 🔨	1	1	0	1	0	0	0	0	1	1	5
Saskatchewan (Englot)	0	0	1	0	2	1	0	2	0	0	6

Sheet D	1	2	3	4	5	6	7	8	9	10	Final
Alberta (Kleibrink) 🔨	0	1	0	1	0	1	0	1	0	X	4
Quebec (Larouche)	0	0	1	0	3	0	2	0	2	X	8

=== Draw 10 ===
Tuesday, February 19, 2:00 pm

Sheet A	1	2	3	4	5	6	7	8	9	10	Final
Saskatchewan (Englot) 🔨	0	1	0	0	0	2	0	1	X	X	4
Nova Scotia (Arsenault)	1	0	2	1	2	0	2	0	X	X	8

Sheet B	1	2	3	4	5	6	7	8	9	10	Final
Quebec (Larouche) 🔨	4	0	2	0	1	0	0	3	0	X	10
Manitoba (Jones)	0	1	0	1	0	3	1	0	2	X	8

Sheet C	1	2	3	4	5	6	7	8	9	10	Final
Canada (Scott) 🔨	0	0	0	2	0	0	4	0	1	X	7
New Brunswick (Robichaud)	0	1	0	0	2	0	0	0	0	X	3

Sheet D	1	2	3	4	5	6	7	8	9	10	Final
Ontario (Middaugh) 🔨	3	0	0	3	0	0	4	X	X	X	10
Prince Edward Island (Gaudet)	0	1	0	0	1	0	0	X	X	X	2

=== Draw 11 ===
Tuesday, February 19, 7:00 pm

Sheet A	1	2	3	4	5	6	7	8	9	10	Final
Manitoba (Jones) 🔨	0	0	0	0	2	0	1	0	X	X	3
Alberta (Kleibrink)	1	1	1	2	0	1	0	4	X	X	10

Sheet B	1	2	3	4	5	6	7	8	9	10	Final
Nova Scotia (Arsenault) 🔨	1	0	2	0	2	0	2	0	0	2	9
Northwest Territories/Yukon (Galusha)	0	1	0	3	0	3	0	0	1	0	8

Sheet C	1	2	3	4	5	6	7	8	9	10	Final
Prince Edward Island (Gaudet) 🔨	1	0	1	0	2	0	1	0	0	0	5
British Columbia (MacInnes)	0	1	0	1	0	2	0	1	0	1	6

Sheet D	1	2	3	4	5	6	7	8	9	10	11	Final
New Brunswick (Robichaud) 🔨	1	3	0	2	0	0	1	0	1	0	0	8
Newfoundland and Labrador (Strong)	0	0	2	0	2	1	0	2	0	1	1	9

=== Draw 12 ===
Wednesday, February 20, 9:30 am

Sheet A	1	2	3	4	5	6	7	8	9	10	11	Final
Prince Edward Island (Gaudet) 🔨	0	2	0	0	3	0	2	1	0	0	1	9
Northwest Territories/Yukon (Galusha)	1	0	1	2	0	1	0	0	2	1	0	8

Sheet B	1	2	3	4	5	6	7	8	9	10	Final
New Brunswick (Robichaud) 🔨	0	0	1	0	1	0	0	1	0	X	3
Alberta (Kleibrink)	0	1	0	2	0	3	1	0	2	X	9

Sheet C	1	2	3	4	5	6	7	8	9	10	Final
Manitoba (Jones) 🔨	0	3	0	0	1	0	0	1	0	3	8
Newfoundland and Labrador (Strong)	2	0	0	1	0	1	1	0	2	0	7

Sheet D	1	2	3	4	5	6	7	8	9	10	Final
Nova Scotia (Arsenault) 🔨	0	2	0	3	1	0	0	0	0	X	6
British Columbia (MacInnes)	1	0	1	0	0	1	1	5	0	X	9

=== Draw 13 ===
Wednesday, February 20, 2:00 pm

Sheet A	1	2	3	4	5	6	7	8	9	10	Final
British Columbia (MacInnes) 🔨	0	0	1	0	0	0	0	X	X	X	1
Quebec (Larouche)	0	2	0	1	2	2	3	X	X	X	10

Sheet B	1	2	3	4	5	6	7	8	9	10	Final
Newfoundland and Labrador (Strong) 🔨	1	0	1	1	1	2	0	0	1	X	7
Saskatchewan (Englot)	0	2	0	0	0	0	2	1	0	X	5

Sheet C	1	2	3	4	5	6	7	8	9	10	11	Final
Alberta (Kleibrink) 🔨	3	0	3	0	0	0	0	2	0	0	2	10
Ontario (Middaugh)	0	2	0	1	0	1	1	0	2	1	0	8

Sheet D	1	2	3	4	5	6	7	8	9	10	Final
Northwest Territories/Yukon (Galusha) 🔨	1	0	1	0	2	0	1	0	0	X	5
Canada (Scott)	0	2	0	1	0	3	0	2	2	X	10

=== Draw 14 ===
Wednesday, February 20, 7:00 pm

Sheet A	1	2	3	4	5	6	7	8	9	10	11	Final
Ontario (Middaugh) 🔨	2	0	1	0	0	0	0	0	2	0	2	7
New Brunswick (Robichaud)	0	1	0	0	1	0	1	1	0	1	0	5

Sheet B	1	2	3	4	5	6	7	8	9	10	Final
Canada (Scott) 🔨	1	0	1	0	0	1	0	2	0	X	5
Prince Edward Island (Gaudet)	0	1	0	3	1	0	2	0	1	X	8

Sheet C	1	2	3	4	5	6	7	8	9	10	Final
Quebec (Larouche) 🔨	1	0	3	0	1	0	0	1	0	0	6
Nova Scotia (Arsenault)	0	2	0	1	0	1	1	0	2	2	9

Sheet D	1	2	3	4	5	6	7	8	9	10	Final
Saskatchewan (Englot) 🔨	1	0	1	0	1	1	0	0	1	X	5
Manitoba (Jones)	0	1	0	1	0	0	3	2	0	X	7

=== Draw 15 ===
Thursday, February 21, 9:30 am

Sheet A	1	2	3	4	5	6	7	8	9	10	11	Final
Nova Scotia (Arsenault) 🔨	0	3	0	0	0	1	0	2	1	0	0	7
Newfoundland and Labrador (Strong)	1	0	2	1	0	0	1	0	0	2	1	8

Sheet B	1	2	3	4	5	6	7	8	9	10	Final
Manitoba (Jones) 🔨	1	0	1	1	0	2	1	0	2	X	8
British Columbia (MacInnes)	0	2	0	0	1	0	0	1	0	X	4

Sheet C	1	2	3	4	5	6	7	8	9	10	Final
New Brunswick (Robichaud) 🔨	1	0	0	1	0	3	2	1	0	0	8
Northwest Territories/Yukon (Galusha)	0	1	1	0	2	0	0	0	3	3	10

Sheet D	1	2	3	4	5	6	7	8	9	10	11	Final
Prince Edward Island (Gaudet) 🔨	0	2	1	0	1	0	1	0	2	0	0	7
Alberta (Kleibrink)	1	0	0	2	0	1	0	1	0	2	1	8

=== Draw 16 ===
Thursday, February 21, 2:00 pm

Sheet A	1	2	3	4	5	6	7	8	9	10	Final
Canada (Scott) 🔨	1	0	0	2	0	0	0	1	X	X	4
Manitoba (Jones)	0	0	3	0	2	2	2	0	X	X	9

Sheet B	1	2	3	4	5	6	7	8	9	10	Final
Ontario (Middaugh) 🔨	1	0	2	0	1	0	2	0	2	1	9
Nova Scotia (Arsenault)	0	1	0	1	0	1	0	2	0	0	5

Sheet C	1	2	3	4	5	6	7	8	9	10	Final
Saskatchewan (Englot) 🔨	1	1	3	1	2	0	X	X	X	X	8
Prince Edward Island (Gaudet)	0	0	0	0	0	1	X	X	X	X	1

Sheet D	1	2	3	4	5	6	7	8	9	10	Final
Quebec (Larouche) 🔨	0	2	0	0	4	0	0	1	1	X	8
New Brunswick (Robichaud)	0	0	0	1	0	1	0	0	0	X	2

=== Draw 17 ===
Thursday, February 21, 7:00 pm

Sheet A	1	2	3	4	5	6	7	8	9	10	Final
Alberta (Kleibrink) 🔨	3	0	0	2	1	0	4	X	X	X	10
Saskatchewan (Englot)	0	0	1	0	0	2	0	X	X	X	3

Sheet B	1	2	3	4	5	6	7	8	9	10	Final
Northwest Territories/Yukon (Galusha) 🔨	0	1	0	0	1	0	2	0	0	X	4
Quebec (Larouche)	0	0	1	2	0	1	0	3	3	X	10

Sheet C	1	2	3	4	5	6	7	8	9	10	11	Final
British Columbia (MacInnes) 🔨	1	2	0	1	0	0	2	0	1	0	0	7
Canada (Scott)	0	0	1	0	1	1	0	3	0	1	1	8

Sheet D	1	2	3	4	5	6	7	8	9	10	Final
Newfoundland and Labrador (Strong) 🔨	0	2	0	1	0	1	0	0	1	X	5
Ontario (Middaugh)	0	0	2	0	2	0	2	2	0	X	8

== Tiebreaker ==
Friday, February 22, 9:30 am

Sheet B	1	2	3	4	5	6	7	8	9	10	Final
Manitoba (Jones) 🔨	0	1	1	1	1	0	0	0	2	X	6
Newfoundland and Labrador (Strong)	1	0	0	0	0	1	0	1	0	X	3

Player percentages
Manitoba		Newfoundland and Labrador	
Dawn Askin	97%	Peg Goss	86%
Jill Officer	94%	Laura Strong	80%
Cathy Overton-Clapham	84%	Cathy Cunningham	84%
Jennifer Jones	85%	Heather Strong	65%
Total	90%	Total	79%

== Playoffs ==
Page playoff system
1	Alberta	8
2	Ontario	7
3	Quebec	5
4	Manitoba	6

Semifinal
2	Ontario	8
4	Manitoba	9

Final
1	Alberta	4
4	Manitoba	6

=== 1 vs. 2 ===
Friday, February 22, 2:00 pm

Team	1	2	3	4	5	6	7	8	9	10	11	Final
Alberta (Kleibrink) 🔨	2	0	2	0	1	0	0	2	0	0	1	8
Ontario (Middaugh)	0	1	0	1	0	2	1	0	1	1	0	7

Player percentages
Alberta		Ontario	
Chelsey Bell	86%	Andra Harmark	82%
Bronwen Saunders	86%	Kim Moore	84%
Amy Nixon	97%	Kirsten Wall	77%
Shannon Kleibrink	83%	Sherry Middaugh	90%
Total	88%	Total	83%

=== 3 vs. 4 ===
Friday, February 22, 7:00 pm

Sheet B	1	2	3	4	5	6	7	8	9	10	Final
Quebec (Larouche) 🔨	0	1	0	1	0	0	1	0	2	X	5
Manitoba (Jones)	0	0	2	0	1	2	0	1	0	X	6

Player percentages
Quebec		Manitoba	
Joëlle Sabourin	95%	Dawn Askin	83%
Annie Lemay	79%	Jill Officer	84%
Nancy Bélanger	78%	Cathy Overton-Clapham	85%
Marie-France Larouche	70%	Jennifer Jones	80%
Total	80%	Total	83%

=== Semifinal ===
Saturday, February 23, 10:30 am

Sheet B	1	2	3	4	5	6	7	8	9	10	11	Final
Ontario (Middaugh) 🔨	1	0	0	0	3	0	2	0	2	0	0	8
Manitoba (Jones)	0	2	1	1	0	2	0	1	0	1	1	9

Player percentages
Ontario		Manitoba	
Andra Harmark	83%	Dawn Askin	93%
Kim Moore	84%	Jill Officer	84%
Kirsten Wall	89%	Cathy Overton-Clapham	81%
Sherry Middaugh	66%	Jennifer Jones	83%
Total	80%	Total	85%

=== Final ===
Sunday, February 24, 11:30 am

Sheet B	1	2	3	4	5	6	7	8	9	10	Final
Alberta (Kleibrink) 🔨	0	1	0	2	0	1	0	0	0	0	4
Manitoba (Jones)	0	0	2	0	2	0	0	1	0	1	6

Player percentages
Alberta		Manitoba	
Chelsey Bell	94%	Dawn Askin	91%
Bronwen Saunders	81%	Jill Officer	89%
Amy Nixon	74%	Cathy Overton-Clapham	89%
Shannon Kleibrink	76%	Jennifer Jones	86%
Total	81%	Total	89%

== Statistics ==
=== Top 5 Player Percentages ===
Round robin only

Key
First All-Star Team
Second All-Star Team

Leads	%
(Canada) Renee Simons	89
(Manitoba) Dawn Askin	88
(Alberta) Chelsey Bell	87
(Quebec) Joëlle Sabourin	84
(British Columbia) Amanda Brennan	82
(Ontario) Andra Harmark	82

Seconds	%
(Canada) Sasha Carter	84
(Manitoba) Jill Officer	84
(Prince Edward Island) Carol Webb	82
(Newfoundland and Labrador) Laura Strong	81
(Alberta) Bronwen Saunders	81
(Ontario) Kim Moore	81
(Nova Scotia) Laine Peters	81

Thirds	%
(Alberta) Amy Nixon	84
(Canada) Jeanna Schraeder	82
(Manitoba) Cathy Overton-Clapham	82
(Quebec) Nancy Bélanger	80
(Nova Scotia) Kim Kelly	80

Skips	%
(Alberta) Shannon Kleibrink	83
(Ontario) Sherry Middaugh	80
(Quebec) Marie-France Larouche	77
(Manitoba) Jennifer Jones	76
(Nova Scotia) Mary-Anne Arsenault	76
(Newfoundland and Labrador) Heather Strong	76

== Awards ==
=== All-Star teams ===
First Team
Position	Name	Team
Skip	Shannon Kleibrink	Alberta
Third	Amy Nixon	Alberta
Second	Jill Officer	Manitoba
Lead	Chelsey Bell	Alberta

Second Team
Position	Name	Team
Skip	Sherry Middaugh	Ontario
Third	Cathy Overton-Clapham	Manitoba
Second	Sasha Carter	Canada
Lead	Dawn Askin	Manitoba

=== Marj Mitchell Sportsmanship Award ===
The Marj Mitchell Sportsmanship Award was presented to the player chosen by their fellow peers as the curler that most exemplified sportsmanship and dedication to curling during the annual Scotties Tournament of Hearts.

Name	Position	Team
Stefanie Clark (3)	Lead	Prince Edward Island

=== Sandra Schmirler Most Valuable Player Award ===
The Sandra Schmirler Most Valuable Player Award was awarded to the top player in the playoff round by members of the media in the Scotties Tournament of Hearts.

Name	Position	Team
Cathy Overton-Clapham	Third	Manitoba

=== Joan Mead Builder Award ===
The Joan Mead Builder Award recognizes a builder in the sport of curling named in the honour of the late CBC curling producer Joan Mead.

Name	Contribution(s)
Don Wittman	CBC broadcaster

=== Ford Hot Shots ===
The Ford Hot Shots was a skills competition preceding the round robin of the tournament. Each competitor had to perform a series of shots with each shot scoring between 0 and 5 points depending on where the stone came to rest. The winner of this edition of the event would win a two-year lease on a Ford Fusion SEL V6.

Winner	Runner-Up	Score
(Manitoba) Jill Officer	(Prince Edward Island) Robyn MacPhee	22–15

=== Shot of the Week Award ===
The Shot of the Week Award was awarded to the curler who had been determined with the most outstanding shot during the tournament as voted on by TSN commentators.

Name	Position	Team
Sherry Middaugh	Skip	Ontario

== Playdowns ==
Names in italics indicate defending provincial champions

=== Alberta ===
January 22–26, Peace Memorial Multiplex, Wainwright

(triple elimination until championship round)

Skip	W	L
Shannon Kleibrink	7	2
Renée Sonnenberg	5	1
Cheryl Bernard	4	3
Faye White	4	3
Cathy King	3	3
Tiffany Odegard	3	3
Heather Rankin	2	3
Karen Powell	2	3
Chana Martineau	2	3
Megan Kirk	1	3
Deb Santos	0	3
Glenys Bakker	0	3

- A vs. B: Sonnenberg 8-4 Bernard
- C vs. C: Kleibrink 6-2 Odegard
- Semi-final: Kleibrink 10-5 Bernard
- Final: Kleibrink 7-6 Sonnenberg

=== British Columbia ===
January 23–27, Trail Curling Club, Trail

Skip	W	L
Jody Maskiewich	6	1
Allison MacInnes	6	1
Kristen Recksiedler	5	2
Marla Mallett	4	3
Shellan Reed	4	3
Jill Winters	2	5
Sandra Jenkins	1	6
Simone Groundwater	0	7

- Semi-final: MacInnes 6-4 Recksiedler
- Final: MacInnes 6-5 Maskiewich

Defending champion, Kelley Law did not participate/qualify

=== Manitoba ===
January 23–27, Gimli Recreation Centre, Gimli

Red Group

Skip	W	L
Jennifer Jones	6	1
Kristy Jenion	5	2
Maureen Bonar	4	3
Kerri Flett	4	3
Chelsea Carey	3	4
Tasha Hunter	3	4
Calleen Neufeld	3	4
Michelle Hlady	0	7

Black Group

Skip	W	L
Barb Spencer	6	1
Terry Ursel	5	2
Liza Park	4	3
Darcy Robertson	4	3
Linda Stewart	4	3
Lois Fowler	2	5
Kim Link	2	5
Kendra Green	1	6

- Red 1 vs. Black 1: Spencer 9-6 Jones
- Red 2 vs. Black 2: Jenion 7-4 Ursel
- Semi-final: Jones 10-6 Jenion
- Final: Jones 8-5 Spencer

=== New Brunswick ===
January 23–27, Thistle St. Andrews Curling Club, Saint John

Skip	W	L
Becky Atkinson	6	1
Andrea Kelly	5	2
Sylvie Robichaud	5	2
Heidi Hanlon	4	3
Sandy Comeau	4	3
Sharon Levesque	2	5
Shelly Graham	1	6
Bridget Thornton	1	6

- Semi-final: Robichaud 9-3 Kelly
- Final: Robichaud 6-5 Atkinson

=== Newfoundland and Labrador ===
January 23–27, Bally Haly Golf and Curling Club, St. John's

Skip	W	L
Heather Strong	5	1
Shelley Nichols	5	1
Bobbie Sauder	4	2
Cindy Miller	3	3
Michelle Jewer	2	4
Barb Pinsent	2	4
Vicki Anstey	0	6

- Semi-final: Nichols 6-5 Sauder
- Final: Strong 9-3 Nichols

=== Nova Scotia ===
January 22–27, Halifax Curling Club, Halifax

Skip	W	L
Colleen Pinkney	5	2
Mary-Anne Arsenault	5	2
Mary Mattatall	4	3
Meredith Harrison	4	3
Theresa Breen	4	3
Sarah Rhyno	3	4
Nancy McConnery	2	5
Jocelyn Nix	1	6

- Tie-breaker: Breen 6-5 Harrison
- 1 vs. 2: Pinkney 6-5 Arsenault
- 3 vs. 4: Mattatall 8-7 Breen
- Semi-final: Arsenault 6-5 Mattatall
- Final: Arsenault 7-6 Pinkney

Defending champion Jill Mouzar is playing third for Harrison

=== Ontario ===
January 21–27, Espanola Curling Club, Espanola

Skip	W	L
Sherry Middaugh	8	1
Krista McCarville	6	3
Alison Goring	6	3
Janet McGhee	6	3
Jenn Hanna	6	3
Julie Reddick	5	4
Colleen Madonia	3	6
Tracy Horgan	3	6
Amy Stachiw	2	7
Meri Bolander	0	9

- Tie-breaker: McGhee 9-3 Hanna
- 1 vs. 2: McCarville 6-5 Middaugh
- 3 vs. 4: Goring 7-3 McGhee
- Semi-final: Middaugh 7-2 Goring
- Final: Middaugh 7-6 McCarville

=== Prince Edward Island ===
January 18–22, Charlottetown Curling Club, Charlottetown

Triple knock out tournament

Skip	W	L
Suzanne Gaudet	7	1
Shelly Bradley	4	3
Donna Butler	4	3
Rebecca Jean MacPhee	3	3
Shirley Berry	2	3
Krista Cameron	2	3
Lori Robinson	2	3
Karen Currie	1	3
Faith LeClair	0	3

=== Quebec ===
January 13–20, Club de curling Etchemin, Saint-Romuald

Section A

Skip	W	L
Marie-France Larouche	7	0
Véronique Brassard	5	2
Kimberly Mastine	5	2
Joëlle Belley	4	3
Geneviève Frappier	4	3
Annie Cadorette	2	5
Mélanie Provost	1	6
Julie Hamel	0	7

Section B

Skip	W	L
Ève Bélisle	7	0
Chantal Osborne	6	1
Hélène Pelchat	5	2
Véronique Grégoire	3	4
Jessica Marchand	2	5
Nathalie Gagnon	2	5
Claudy Daoust	2	5
Sophie Morissette	1	6

Page playoffs

- Tie-breaker: Brassard 9-2 Mastine
- A2 vs. B2: Osborne 10-7 Brassard
- A1 vs. B1: Larouche 6-5 Bélisle
- Semi-final: Bélisle 7-6 Osborne
- Final: Larouche 11-8 Bélisle

=== Saskatchewan ===
January 23–27, North Battleford Granite Curling Club, North Battleford

Skip	W	L
Michelle Englot	6	2
Ros Stewart	6	2
Stefanie Lawton	6	2
Sherry Anderson	5	3
Amber Holland	3	5
Angela Gordon	3	5
Linda Burnham	3	5
Cathy Trowell	2	6
Rene Miettinen	2	6

- Semi-final: Lawton 7-5 Stewart
- Final: Englot 5-4 Lawton

Defending champion, Jan Betker did not participate/qualify

=== Northwest Territories/Yukon ===
January 24–27 at the Yellowknife Curling Club, Yellowknife

Skip	W	L
Kerry Galusha	6	0
Sharon Cormier	3	3
Leslie Grant	2	4
Gloria Allen	1	5

== See also ==
- 2008 Tim Hortons Brier
- 2008 World Men's Curling Championship
- 2008 World Junior Curling Championships
- 2008 World Mixed Doubles Curling Championship
- 2008 Ford World Women's Curling Championship
