= 2006 Canada Cup of Curling =

2006 Strauss Canada Cup of Curling
- Host city: Kamloops, British Columbia
- Arena: Interior Savings Centre
- Dates: 31 Jan – 5 Feb 2006
- Attendance: 25,495
- Men's winner: Kevin Martin
- Curling club: Saville Sports Centre, Edmonton
- Skip: Kevin Martin
- Third: Don Walchuk
- Second: Carter Rycroft
- Lead: Don Bartlett
- Finalist: Glenn Howard
- Women's winner: Cathy King
- Curling club: Saville Sports Centre, Edmonton
- Skip: Cathy King
- Third: Lori Armistead
- Second: Raylene Rocque
- Lead: Tracy Bush
- Coach: Randy Olson
- Finalist: Jennifer Jones

The 2006 Strauss Canada Cup of Curling was held 31 January – 5 February 2006 at the Interior Savings Centre in Kamloops, British Columbia. The Kevin Martin rink won their second men's title and Cathy King won her first title on the women's side.

== Men's event ==
=== Teams ===
Skip	Third	Second	Lead	Locale
Jim Cotter	Kevin MacKenzie	Jeff Richard	Rick Sawatsky	(British Columbia) Kelowna Curling Club, Kelowna
Glen Despins	Dale Despins	Wayne Despins	Dean Hicke	(Saskatchewan) Callie Curling Club, Regina
David Nedohin	Randy Ferbey (skip)	Scott Pfeifer	Marcel Rocque	(Alberta) Granite Curling Club, Edmonton
Brad Gushue	Mark Nichols	Russ Howard (skip)	Jamie Korab	(Newfoundland and Labrador) St. John's Curling Club, St. John's
Brad Heidt	Joel Jordison	Brent Gedak	Mitch Heidt	(Saskatchewan) Kerrobert Curling Club, Kerrobert
Glenn Howard	Richard Hart	Brent Laing	Craig Savill	(Ontario) Coldwater & District Curling Club, Coldwater
Mark Johnson	Bob Bucholz	Glen Kennedy	Bryan Blaylock	(Alberta) Saville Sports Centre, Edmonton
Kevin Martin	Don Walchuk	Carter Rycroft	Don Bartlett	(Alberta) Saville Sports Centre, Edmonton
John Morris	Kevin Koe	Marc Kennedy	Ben Hebert	(Alberta) Calgary Winter Club, Calgary
Bob Ursel	T. J. Perepolkin	Kevin Folk	Brendan Willis	(British Columbia) Kelowna Curling Club, Kelowna

Key
Teams to Playoffs

=== Preliminary round ===
Group A	W	L
(Ontario) Glenn Howard	4	1
(Alberta) John Morris	4	1
(Alberta) Randy Ferbey	3	2
(Saskatchewan) Glen Despins	1	4
(Saskatchewan) Brad Heidt	0	5

Group B	W	L
(Alberta) Kevin Martin	5	0
(British Columbia) Bob Ursel	4	1
(Newfoundland and Labrador) Brad Gushue	2	3
(Alberta) Mark Johnson	2	3
(British Columbia) Jim Cotter	0	5

=== Playoffs ===
Page playoff system
A1	Howard	5
B1	Martin	4
A2	Morris	8
B2	Ursel	1

Semifinal
B1	Martin	7
A2	Morris	4

Final
A1	Howard	4
B1	Martin	5

== Women's event ==
=== Teams ===
Skip	Third	Second	Lead	Locale
Jan Betker	Sherry Linton	Joan McCusker	Jolene McIvor	(Saskatchewan) Callie Curling Club, Regina
Sandy Comeau	Stacey Leger	Allison Farrell	Carol Webb	(New Brunswick) Beaver Curling Club, Moncton
Janet Harvey	Jill Thurston	Cherie-Ann Loder	Carey Burgess	(Manitoba) Fort Rouge Curling Club, Winnipeg
Jennifer Jones	Cathy Overton-Clapham	Jill Officer	Georgina Wheatcroft	(Manitoba) St. Vital Curling Club, Winnipeg
Cathy King	Lori Armistead	Raylene Rocque	Tracy Bush	(Alberta) Saville Sports Centre, Edmonton
Shannon Kleibrink	Amy Nixon	Glenys Bakker	Christine Keshen	(Alberta) Calgary Winter Club, Calgary
Heather Rankin	Deanna Doig	Samantha Preston	Nicole Jacques	(Alberta) Calgary Curling Club, Calgary
Kelly Scott	Jeanna Schraeder	Sasha Carter	Renee Simons	(British Columbia) Kelowna Curling Club, Kelowna
Renée Sonnenberg	Nikki Smith	Twyla Bruce	Tina McDonald	(Alberta) Sexsmith Curling Club, Sexsmith
Heather Strong	Shelley Nichols	Laura Strong	Susan O'Leary	(Newfoundland and Labrador) St. John's Curling Club, St. John's

Key
Teams to Playoffs
Teams to Tiebreaker

=== Preliminary round ===
Group A	W	L
(Alberta) Renee Sonnenberg	4	1
(New Brunswick) Sandy Comeau	4	1
(Saskatchewan) Jan Betker	3	2
(Manitoba) Janet Harvey	1	4
(Alberta) Shannon Kleibrink	1	4

Group B	W	L
(Alberta) Cathy King	4	1
(Manitoba) Jennifer Jones	3	2
(British Columbia) Kelly Scott	3	2
(Alberta) Heather Rankin	1	4
(Newfoundland and Labrador) Heather Strong	1	4

=== Tie breaker ===
- Jones 7, Scott 5

=== Playoffs ===
Page playoff system
A1	Sonnenberg	4
B1	King	10
A2	Comeau	8
B2	Jones	10

Semifinal
A1	Sonnenberg	4
B2	Jones	7

Final
B1	King	10
B2	Jones	9
