= 2007 Scotties Tournament of Hearts =

- Host city: Lethbridge, Alberta
- Arena: ENMAX Centre
- Dates: February 17–25
- Attendance: 79,975
- Winner: Canada
- Curling club: Kelowna CC, Kelowna
- Skip: Kelly Scott
- Third: Jeanna Schraeder
- Second: Sasha Carter
- Lead: Renee Simons
- Alternate: Michelle Allen
- Coach: Gerry Richard
- Finalist: Saskatchewan (Jan Betker)

The 2007 Scotties Tournament of Hearts, Canada's women's curling championship, was held February 17–25 at the ENMAX Centre in Lethbridge, Alberta. It marks the first year under the Scotties brand name. The winner was the defending champions Team Canada, under skip Kelly Scott.

== Teams ==
The teams are listed as follows:

Team Canada	Alberta	British Columbia
Kelowna CC, Kelowna Skip: Kelly Scott; Third: Jeanna Schraeder; Second: Sasha Carter; Lead: Renee Simons; Alternate: Michelle Allen	Calgary WC, Calgary Skip: Cheryl Bernard; Third: Susan O'Connor; Second: Carolyn Darbyshire; Lead: Cori Bartel; Alternate: Vicki Sjolie	Royal City CC, New Westminster Skip: Kelley Law; Third: Georgina Wheatcroft; Second: Shannon Aleksic; Lead: Darah Provencal; Alternate: Steph Jackson
Manitoba	New Brunswick	Newfoundland and Labrador
St. Vital CC, Winnipeg Skip: Jennifer Jones; Third: Cathy Overton-Clapham; Second: Jill Officer; Lead: Janet Arnott; Alternate: Kristen Williamson	Beaver CC, Moncton Skip: Sandy Comeau; Third: Denise Nowlan; Second: Marie-Anne Power; Lead: Jeanette Murphy; Alternate: Jane Boyle	St. John's CC, St. John's Skip: Heather Strong; Third: Shelley Nichols; Second: Laura Strong; Lead: Susan O'Leary; Alternate: Cathy Cunningham
Nova Scotia	Ontario	Prince Edward Island
Mayflower CC, Halifax Skip: Jill Mouzar; Third: Meredith Harrison (Note: Team Nova Scotia alternate Mary Mattatall threw third stones in Draw 12.); Second: Teri Lake; Lead: Hayley Clarke; Alternate: Mary Mattatall	Fort William CC, Thunder Bay Skip: Krista Scharf; Third: Tara George; Second: Tiffany Stubbings; Lead: Lorraine Lang; Alternate: Heather Houston	Charlottetown CC, Charlottetown Skip: Suzanne Gaudet; Third: Robyn MacPhee; Second: Carol Webb; Lead: Stefanie Clark (Note: Team Prince Edward Island alternate Sinead Dolan threw lead stones in Draws 13 and 14.); Alternate: Sinead Dolan
Quebec	Saskatchewan	Northwest Territories/Yukon
Thurso CC, Thurso Skip: Chantal Osborne; Third: Cheryl Morgan; Second: Catherine Derick; Lead: Sylvie Daniel; Alternate: Brenda Nicholls	Callie CC, Regina Skip: Jan Betker; Third: Lana Vey; Second: Nancy Inglis; Lead: Marcia Gudereit; Alternate: Sherry Linton	Yellowknife CC, Yellowknife Fourth: Monique Gagner; Skip: Kerry Koe; Second: Kelli Turpin (Note: Team Northwest Territories/Yukon second Kelli Turpin did not play in Draws 6, 7, 10, and 16 (Turpin missed Draws 6 and 7 due to illness). For Draws 6, 7, and 16, alternate Nicole Baldwin threw second stones. For Draw 10, lead Dawn Moses threw second stones and Baldwin threw lead stones.); Lead: Dawn Moses; Alternate: Nicole Baldwin

== Map of teams ==
Team Canada Provincial Winners

== Round Robin standings ==
Final round robin standings

Key
Teams to Playoffs
Teams to Tiebreakers

Locale	Skip	W	L	W–L	PF	PA	EW	EL	BE	SE	S%
Canada	Kelly Scott	10	1	–	89	46	52	33	8	19	82%
Saskatchewan	Jan Betker	9	2	1–0	84	52	47	36	10	17	83%
Manitoba	Jennifer Jones	9	2	0–1	90	59	45	41	6	15	81%
Prince Edward Island	Suzanne Gaudet	6	5	1–1 (Note: Team Prince Edward Island received a bye in the tiebreakers over Alberta and Ontario by virtue of finishing better in the skills competition at the start of the tournament.)	80	75	49	46	8	16	74%
Alberta	Cheryl Bernard	6	5	1–1	67	68	42	44	8	12	77%
Ontario	Krista Scharf	6	5	1–1	70	78	45	50	10	8	76%
Newfoundland and Labrador	Heather Strong	5	6	1–0	69	78	48	46	10	13	74%
British Columbia	Kelley Law	5	6	0–1	82	83	45	52	5	10	77%
Quebec	Chantal Osborne	4	7	–	73	88	47	49	2	12	69%
Nova Scotia	Jill Mouzar	3	8	–	66	78	45	51	5	14	72%
Northwest Territories/Yukon	Kerry Koe	2	9	–	64	93	44	50	10	9	73%
New Brunswick	Sandy Comeau	1	10	–	51	87	35	48	14	8	72%

== Round Robin results ==
All draw times are listed in Mountain Time (UTC−07:00).

=== Draw 1 ===
Saturday, February 17, 2:00 pm

Sheet A	1	2	3	4	5	6	7	8	9	10	Final
Canada (Scott) 🔨	0	2	0	0	2	0	1	0	3	X	8
Newfoundland and Labrador (Strong)	0	0	1	1	0	1	0	2	0	X	5

Sheet B	1	2	3	4	5	6	7	8	9	10	Final
Saskatchewan (Betker)	2	0	1	1	0	2	0	2	1	X	9
Manitoba (Jones) 🔨	0	1	0	0	1	0	1	0	0	X	3

Sheet C	1	2	3	4	5	6	7	8	9	10	Final
Northwest Territories/Yukon (Koe) 🔨	1	0	0	1	0	1	1	0	1	1	6
Nova Scotia (Mouzar)	0	0	1	0	1	0	0	1	0	0	3

Sheet D	1	2	3	4	5	6	7	8	9	10	Final
Alberta (Bernard)	0	0	1	0	0	0	0	1	0	X	2
Prince Edward Island (Gaudet)	0	1	0	1	2	1	1	0	1	X	7

=== Draw 2 ===
Saturday, February 17, 6:30 pm

Sheet A	1	2	3	4	5	6	7	8	9	10	Final
Nova Scotia (Mouzar)🔨	1	0	0	0	1	0	1	0	0	X	3
Saskatchewan (Betker)	0	2	0	0	0	2	0	3	1	X	8

Sheet B	1	2	3	4	5	6	7	8	9	10	Final
British Columbia (Law)	0	3	0	4	0	2	0	3	X	X	12
Quebec (Osborne) 🔨	1	0	2	0	1	0	1	0	X	X	5

Sheet C	1	2	3	4	5	6	7	8	9	10	11	Final
New Brunswick (Comeau)	0	0	2	0	2	0	0	0	0	1	0	5
Ontario (Scharf)	0	0	0	2	0	2	0	1	0	0	1	6

Sheet D	1	2	3	4	5	6	7	8	9	10	Final
Northwest Territories/Yukon (Koe) 🔨	0	3	0	2	2	0	0	0	1	0	8
Manitoba (Jones)	0	0	1	0	0	2	3	1	0	5	12

=== Draw 3 ===
Sunday, February 18, 8:30 am

Sheet B	1	2	3	4	5	6	7	8	9	10	Final
Prince Edward Island (Gaudet) 🔨	1	0	0	3	1	0	0	1	0	X	6
Canada (Scott)	0	3	1	0	0	2	2	0	3	X	11

Sheet C	1	2	3	4	5	6	7	8	9	10	Final
Alberta (Bernard) 🔨	0	1	0	1	1	0	0	3	2	X	8
Newfoundland and Labrador (Strong)	0	0	1	0	0	2	2	0	0	X	5

=== Draw 4 ===
Sunday, February 18, 15:00

Sheet A	1	2	3	4	5	6	7	8	9	10	Final
Quebec (Osborne) 🔨	1	1	0	0	0	2	0	4	0	1	9
New Brunswick (Comeau)	0	0	3	1	0	0	1	0	1	0	6

Sheet B	1	2	3	4	5	6	7	8	9	10	Final
Manitoba (Jones) 🔨	2	0	3	0	0	0	2	0	0	1	8
Nova Scotia (Mouzar)	0	3	0	1	1	1	0	1	0	0	7

Sheet C	1	2	3	4	5	6	7	8	9	10	Final
Saskatchewan (Betker) 🔨	0	1	2	0	0	1	0	1	0	1	6
Northwest Territories/Yukon (Koe)	1	0	0	3	0	0	0	0	1	0	5

Sheet D	1	2	3	4	5	6	7	8	9	10	11	Final
British Columbia (Law) 🔨	1	0	0	1	1	0	0	1	1	0	0	5
Ontario (Scharf)	0	0	1	0	0	1	1	0	0	2	2	7

=== Draw 5 ===
Sunday, February 18, 6:00 pm

Sheet A	1	2	3	4	5	6	7	8	9	10	Final
Newfoundland and Labrador (Strong) 🔨	0	2	0	1	0	1	0	1	0	1	6
Prince Edward Island (Gaudet)	0	0	2	0	0	0	1	0	1	0	4

Sheet B	1	2	3	4	5	6	7	8	9	10	Final
New Brunswick (Comeau) 🔨	2	1	2	0	3	0	0	1	0	0	9
British Columbia (Law)	0	0	0	2	0	3	2	0	2	1	10

Sheet C	1	2	3	4	5	6	7	8	9	10	11	Final
Ontario (Scharf) 🔨	2	0	2	0	1	0	2	0	0	1	1	9
Quebec (Osborne)	0	2	0	1	0	1	0	2	2	0	0	8

Sheet D	1	2	3	4	5	6	7	8	9	10	Final
Canada (Scott) 🔨	2	0	2	0	3	2	X	X	X	X	9
Alberta (Bernard)	0	1	0	1	0	0	X	X	X	X	2

=== Draw 6 ===
Monday, February 19, 8:30 am

Sheet A	1	2	3	4	5	6	7	8	9	10	11	Final
Alberta (Bernard) 🔨	1	0	0	0	2	0	0	1	1	1	0	6
Northwest Territories/Yukon (Koe)	0	0	2	1	0	2	1	0	0	0	1	7

Sheet B	1	2	3	4	5	6	7	8	9	10	Final
Prince Edward Island (Gaudet) 🔨	1	0	2	0	0	0	0	2	0	X	5
Saskatchewan (Betker)	0	2	0	2	0	2	0	0	3	X	9

Sheet C	1	2	3	4	5	6	7	8	9	10	Final
Canada (Scott) 🔨	2	0	1	1	1	2	0	X	X	X	7
Nova Scotia (Mouzar)	0	1	0	0	0	0	1	X	X	X	2

Sheet D	1	2	3	4	5	6	7	8	9	10	Final
Newfoundland and Labrador (Strong) 🔨	0	1	0	0	0	1	0	X	X	X	2
Manitoba (Jones)	0	0	1	1	2	0	4	X	X	X	8

=== Draw 7 ===
Monday, February 19, 1:00 PM

Sheet A	1	2	3	4	5	6	7	8	9	10	Final
Saskatchewan (Betker) 🔨	2	2	0	3	2	1	X	X	X	X	10
Ontario (Scharf)	0	0	1	0	0	0	X	X	X	X	1

Sheet B	1	2	3	4	5	6	7	8	9	10	Final
Northwest Territories/Yukon (Koe) 🔨	0	0	3	0	0	1	0	2	0	X	6
Quebec (Osborne)	1	1	0	4	1	0	2	0	3	X	12

Sheet C	1	2	3	4	5	6	7	8	9	10	Final
Manitoba (Jones) 🔨	1	1	3	5	0	0	X	X	X	X	10
New Brunswick (Comeau)	0	0	0	0	2	1	X	X	X	X	3

Sheet D	1	2	3	4	5	6	7	8	9	10	Final
Nova Scotia (Mouzar) 🔨	0	1	0	2	0	1	1	0	0	X	5
British Columbia (Law)	1	0	3	0	3	0	0	1	1	X	9

=== Draw 8 ===
Monday, February 19, 6:00 pm

Sheet A	1	2	3	4	5	6	7	8	9	10	Final
British Columbia (Law) 🔨	0	0	0	1	3	0	2	1	0	X	7
Canada (Scott)	0	0	1	0	0	2	0	0	2	X	5

Sheet B	1	2	3	4	5	6	7	8	9	10	Final
New Brunswick (Comeau) 🔨	0	2	0	0	0	1	0	0	1	X	4
Newfoundland and Labrador (Strong)	0	0	0	3	0	0	1	2	0	X	6

Sheet C	1	2	3	4	5	6	7	8	9	10	Final
Quebec (Osborne) 🔨	0	1	0	0	1	0	1	X	X	X	3
Alberta (Bernard)	1	0	3	1	0	3	0	X	X	X	8

Sheet D	1	2	3	4	5	6	7	8	9	10	Final
Ontario (Scharf) 🔨	2	1	2	0	0	0	3	0	2	X	10
Prince Edward Island (Gaudet)	0	0	0	1	1	1	0	3	0	X	6

=== Draw 9 ===
Tuesday, February 20, 8:30 am

Sheet A	1	2	3	4	5	6	7	8	9	10	Final
Quebec (Osborne) 🔨	1	0	0	2	1	0	2	0	0	X	6
Newfoundland and Labrador (Strong)	0	1	1	0	0	1	0	1	1	X	5

Sheet B	1	2	3	4	5	6	7	8	9	10	11	Final
Ontario (Scharf) 🔨	0	2	0	0	1	2	0	1	0	1	0	7
Canada (Scott)	0	0	1	2	0	0	3	0	1	0	1	8

Sheet C	1	2	3	4	5	6	7	8	9	10	11	Final
British Columbia (Law) 🔨	1	2	0	0	0	1	0	1	0	2	0	7
Prince Edward Island (Gaudet)	0	0	1	1	2	0	2	0	1	0	1	8

Sheet D	1	2	3	4	5	6	7	8	9	10	Final
New Brunswick (Comeau) 🔨	1	0	1	0	1	0	1	0	0	X	4
Alberta (Bernard)	0	1	0	2	0	2	0	2	1	X	8

=== Draw 10 ===
Tuesday, February 20, 1:00 pm

Sheet A	1	2	3	4	5	6	7	8	9	10	Final
Prince Edward Island (Gaudet) 🔨	0	1	0	2	0	1	1	1	0	0	6
Manitoba (Jones)	2	0	1	0	1	0	0	0	2	1	7

Sheet B	1	2	3	4	5	6	7	8	9	10	Final
Alberta (Bernard) 🔨	2	1	0	3	0	0	1	0	1	2	10
Nova Scotia (Mouzar)	0	0	2	0	2	1	0	1	0	0	6

Sheet C	1	2	3	4	5	6	7	8	9	10	Final
Newfoundland and Labrador (Strong) 🔨	1	0	1	2	0	0	2	3	0	X	9
Saskatchewan (Betker)	0	1	0	0	3	1	0	0	1	X	6

Sheet D	1	2	3	4	5	6	7	8	9	10	Final
Canada (Scott) 🔨	4	0	2	0	2	1	X	X	X	X	9
Northwest Territories/Yukon (Koe)	0	1	0	1	0	0	X	X	X	X	2

=== Draw 11 ===
Tuesday, February 20, 6:00 pm

Sheet A	1	2	3	4	5	6	7	8	9	10	Final
Nova Scotia (Mouzar) 🔨	0	0	2	1	0	1	1	1	2	X	8
New Brunswick (Comeau)	1	1	0	0	2	0	0	0	0	0	4

Sheet B	1	2	3	4	5	6	7	8	9	10	Final
Manitoba (Jones) 🔨	0	1	0	1	2	0	0	3	4	X	11
British Columbia (Law)	0	0	1	0	0	3	1	0	0	X	5

Sheet C	1	2	3	4	5	6	7	8	9	10	Final
Northwest Territories/Yukon (Koe)	1	0	0	1	1	0	1	0	1	0	5
Ontario (Scharf)	0	0	3	0	0	2	0	1	0	2	8

Sheet D	1	2	3	4	5	6	7	8	9	10	Final
Saskatchewan (Betker) 🔨	2	0	2	1	1	0	0	2	0	0	8
Quebec (Osborne)	0	1	0	0	0	2	2	0	1	1	7

=== Draw 12 ===
Wednesday, February 21, 8:30 am

Sheet A	1	2	3	4	5	6	7	8	9	10	Final
Northwest Territories/Yukon (Koe) 🔨	2	0	2	1	0	1	0	1	0	X	7
British Columbia (Law)	0	1	0	0	2	0	4	0	5	X	12

Sheet B	1	2	3	4	5	6	7	8	9	10	Final
Saskatchewan (Betker) 🔨	2	0	0	1	3	0	2	X	X	X	8
New Brunswick (Comeau)	0	0	0	0	0	1	0	X	X	X	1

Sheet C	1	2	3	4	5	6	7	8	9	10	Final
Nova Scotia (Mouzar)🔨	0	0	0	2	0	1	0	1	0	X	4
Quebec (Osborne)	1	1	1	0	2	0	1	0	2	X	8

Sheet D	1	2	3	4	5	6	7	8	9	10	Final
Manitoba (Jones) 🔨	2	0	3	0	0	1	1	0	1	X	8
Ontario (Scharf)	0	2	0	1	1	0	0	1	0	X	5

=== Draw 13 ===
Wednesday, February 21, 1:00 pm

Sheet A	1	2	3	4	5	6	7	8	9	10	Final
Ontario (Scharf) 🔨	0	2	0	0	0	0	1	0	1	X	4
Alberta (Bernard)	0	0	0	1	1	0	0	3	0	X	5

Sheet B	1	2	3	4	5	6	7	8	9	10	Final
Quebec (Osborne) 🔨	2	2	0	1	0	0	2	0	0	X	7
Prince Edward Island (Gaudet)	0	0	2	0	1	2	0	3	4	X	12

Sheet C	1	2	3	4	5	6	7	8	9	10	Final
New Brunswick (Comeau) 🔨	0	0	3	0	1	0	1	0	0	X	5
Canada (Scott)	0	3	0	1	0	1	0	1	2	X	8

Sheet D	1	2	3	4	5	6	7	8	9	10	11	Final
British Columbia (Law) 🔨	1	0	0	0	0	2	0	2	0	2	0	7
Newfoundland and Labrador (Strong)	0	0	1	1	3	0	1	0	1	0	1	8

=== Draw 14 ===
Wednesday, February 21, 7:30 pm

Sheet A	1	2	3	4	5	6	7	8	9	10	Final
Canada (Scott) 🔨	1	2	0	1	1	0	2	1	X	X	8
Saskatchewan (Betker)	0	0	1	0	0	1	0	0	X	X	2

Sheet B	1	2	3	4	5	6	7	8	9	10	Final
Newfoundland and Labrador (Strong) 🔨	2	2	1	0	1	0	4	0	0	1	11
Northwest Territories/Yukon (Koe)	0	0	0	2	0	2	0	4	1	0	9

Sheet C	1	2	3	4	5	6	7	8	9	10	Final
Alberta (Bernard) 🔨	0	0	1	1	0	1	0	X	X	X	3
Manitoba (Jones)	2	2	0	0	2	0	4	X	X	X	10

Sheet D	1	2	3	4	5	6	7	8	9	10	11	Final
Prince Edward Island (Gaudet) 🔨	3	2	0	0	0	1	0	3	1	0	1	11
Nova Scotia (Mouzar)	0	0	2	3	1	0	2	0	0	2	0	10

=== Draw 15 ===
Thursday, February 22, 8:30 am

Sheet A	1	2	3	4	5	6	7	8	9	10	Final
Manitoba (Jones) 🔨	2	2	0	1	0	5	X	X	X	X	10
Quebec (Osborne)	0	0	2	0	1	0	X	X	X	X	3

Sheet B	1	2	3	4	5	6	7	8	9	10	Final
Nova Scotia (Mouzar) 🔨	1	1	0	2	0	5	1	X	X	X	10
Ontario (Scharf)	0	0	2	0	1	0	0	X	X	X	3

Sheet C	1	2	3	4	5	6	7	8	9	10	Final
Saskatchewan (Betker) 🔨	3	0	3	2	2	0	X	X	X	X	10
British Columbia (Law)	0	2	0	0	0	1	X	X	X	X	3

Sheet D	1	2	3	4	5	6	7	8	9	10	Final
Northwest Territories/Yukon (Koe) 🔨	0	1	0	0	3	0	1	0	1	0	6
New Brunswick (Comeau)	0	0	0	2	0	2	0	1	0	2	7

=== Draw 16 ===
Thursday, February 22, 1:00 pm

Sheet A	1	2	3	4	5	6	7	8	9	10	Final
Newfoundland and Labrador (Strong) 🔨	0	0	1	0	1	1	0	1	0	0	4
Nova Scotia (Mouzar)	0	2	0	2	0	0	1	0	1	2	8

Sheet B	1	2	3	4	5	6	7	8	9	10	Final
Canada (Scott) 🔨	0	0	2	1	0	1	0	1	3	X	8
Manitoba (Jones)	0	0	0	0	2	0	1	0	0	X	3

Sheet C	1	2	3	4	5	6	7	8	9	10	Final
Prince Edward Island (Gaudet) 🔨	1	0	3	0	0	2	1	0	0	X	7
Northwest Territories/Yukon (Koe)	0	1	0	1	0	0	0	1	0	X	3

Sheet D	1	2	3	4	5	6	7	8	9	10	Final
Alberta (Bernard) 🔨	1	0	0	2	0	1	0	3	0	0	7
Saskatchewan (Betker)	0	0	3	0	1	0	2	0	0	2	8

=== Draw 17 ===
Thursday, February 22, 6:00 pm

Sheet A	1	2	3	4	5	6	7	8	9	10	Final
New Brunswick (Comeau) 🔨	1	0	0	0	1	1	0	X	X	X	3
Prince Edward Island (Gaudet)	0	0	2	2	0	0	4	X	X	X	8

Sheet B	1	2	3	4	5	6	7	8	9	10	Final
British Columbia (Law) 🔨	2	0	1	0	0	1	0	1	0	X	5
Alberta (Bernard)	0	2	0	1	1	0	1	0	3	X	8

Sheet C	1	2	3	4	5	6	7	8	9	10	11	Final
Ontario (Scharf) 🔨	1	0	1	0	1	0	3	0	2	0	2	10
Newfoundland and Labrador (Strong)	0	1	0	1	0	3	0	2	0	1	0	8

Team	1	2	3	4	5	6	7	8	9	10	Final
Quebec (Osborne) 🔨	0	0	2	0	0	1	0	0	2	0	5
Canada (Scott)	1	1	0	1	2	0	0	1	0	2	8

== Tiebreakers ==
Tiebreaker #1		Tiebreaker #2
		Prince Edward Island	5
Ontario	6	Alberta	4
Alberta	13

=== Tiebreaker #1 ===
Friday, February 23, 8:30 am

Sheet A	1	2	3	4	5	6	7	8	9	10	Final
Ontario (Scharf) 🔨	1	0	1	0	0	1	3	0	0	X	6
Alberta (Bernard)	0	2	0	1	1	0	0	4	5	X	13

Player percentages
Ontario		Alberta	
Lorraine Lang	75%	Cori Bartel	81%
Tiffany Stubbings	76%	Carolyn Darbyshire	69%
Tara George	72%	Susan O'Connor	68%
Krista Scharf	56%	Cheryl Bernard	82%
Total	70%	Total	75%

=== Tiebreaker #2 ===
Friday, February 23, 1:00 pm

Sheet D	1	2	3	4	5	6	7	8	9	10	Final
Prince Edward Island (Gaudet) 🔨	0	2	0	0	0	1	0	1	0	1	5
Alberta (Bernard)	0	0	1	0	1	0	1	0	1	0	4

Player percentages
Prince Edward Island		Alberta	
Stefanie Clark	85%	Cori Bartel	85%
Carol Webb	81%	Carolyn Darbyshire	90%
Robyn MacPhee	88%	Susan O'Connor	70%
Suzanne Gaudet	88%	Cheryl Bernard	81%
Total	85%	Total	82%

== Playoffs ==
Page playoff system
1	Canada	5
2	Saskatchewan	8
3	Manitoba	9
4	Prince Edward Island	4

Semifinal
1	Canada	7
3	Manitoba	5

Final
2	Saskatchewan	5
1	Canada	8

=== 1 vs. 2 ===
Friday, February 23, 6:00 pm

Sheet C	1	2	3	4	5	6	7	8	9	10	Final
Canada (Scott) 🔨	2	0	0	1	0	0	2	0	0	X	5
Saskatchewan (Betker)	0	1	2	0	1	1	0	2	1	X	8

Player percentages
Canada		Saskatchewan	
Renee Simons	82%	Marcia Gudereit	85%
Sasha Carter	88%	Nancy Inglis	80%
Jeanna Schraeder	84%	Lana Vey	79%
Kelly Scott	64%	Jan Betker	85%
Total	80%	Total	82%

=== 3 vs. 4 ===
Friday, February 23, 6:00 pm

Sheet B	1	2	3	4	5	6	7	8	9	10	Final
Prince Edward Island (Gaudet)	0	0	1	0	1	0	2	0	X	X	4
Manitoba (Jones) 🔨	2	2	0	1	0	3	0	1	X	X	9

Player percentages
Prince Edward Island		Manitoba	
Stefanie Clark	86%	Janet Arnott	69%
Carol Webb	70%	Jill Officer	72%
Robyn MacPhee	91%	Cathy Overton-Clapham	88%
Suzanne Gaudet	67%	Jennifer Jones	78%
Total	79%	Total	77%

=== Semifinal ===
Saturday, February 24, 12:30 pm

Sheet C	1	2	3	4	5	6	7	8	9	10	Final
Canada (Scott) 🔨	2	1	1	0	1	0	1	0	1	X	7
Manitoba (Jones)	0	0	0	1	0	2	0	2	0	X	5

Player percentages
Canada		Manitoba	
Renee Simons	80%	Janet Arnott	89%
Sasha Carter	81%	Jill Officer	63%
Jeanna Schraeder	81%	Cathy Overton-Clapham	69%
Kelly Scott	83%	Jennifer Jones	64%
Total	81%	Total	71%

=== Final ===
Sunday, February 25, 11:30 am

Sheet C	1	2	3	4	5	6	7	8	9	10	Final
Canada (Scott) 🔨	2	2	0	2	0	0	1	1	0	X	8
Saskatchewan (Betker)	0	0	1	0	1	1	0	0	2	X	5

Player percentages
Canada		Saskatchewan	
Renee Simons	72%	Marcia Gudereit	88%
Sasha Carter	79%	Nancy Inglis	64%
Jeanna Schraeder	89%	Lana Vey	80%
Kelly Scott	82%	Jan Betker	74%
Total	81%	Total	76%

== Statistics ==
=== Top 5 Player Percentages ===
Round robin only

Key
First All-Star Team
Second All-Star Team

Leads	%
(Saskatchewan) Marcia Gudereit	85
(British Columbia) Darah Provencal	85
(Manitoba) Janet Arnott	84
(Northwest Territories) Dawn Moses (Note: Moses' shot percentage includes one draw where she threw second stones.)	83
(Ontario) Lorraine Lang	83
(Newfoundland and Labrador) Susan O'Leary	83

Seconds	%
(Manitoba) Jill Officer	85
(Canada) Sasha Carter	82
(Saskatchewan) Nancy Inglis	81
(British Columbia) Shannon Aleksic	77
(Alberta) Carolyn Darbyshire	76

Thirds	%
(Canada) Jeanna Schraeder	85
(Saskatchewan) Lana Vey	83
(Manitoba) Cathy Overton-Clapham	79
(Alberta) Susan O'Connor	79
(Ontario) Tara George	78

Skips	%
(Canada) Kelly Scott	82
(Saskatchewan) Jan Betker	80
(Manitoba) Jennifer Jones	76
(Alberta) Cheryl Bernard	73
(Newfoundland and Labrador) Heather Strong	73

=== Perfect games ===
Round robin only; minimum 10 shots thrown

Player	Team	Position	Shots	Opponent
Jeanna Schraeder	Canada	Third	12	Alberta

== Awards ==
=== All-Star teams ===
First Team
Position	Name	Team
Skip	Kelly Scott	Canada
Third	Jeanna Schraeder	Canada
Second	Jill Officer	Manitoba
Lead	Marcia Gudereit	Saskatchewan

Second Team
Position	Name	Team
Skip	Jan Betker	Saskatchewan
Third	Lana Vey	Saskatchewan
Second	Sasha Carter	Canada
Lead	Darah Provencal	British Columbia

=== Marj Mitchell Sportsmanship Award ===
The Marj Mitchell Sportsmanship Award was presented to the player chosen by their fellow peers as the curler that most exemplified sportsmanship and dedication to curling during the annual Scotties Tournament of Hearts.

Name	Position	Team
Stefanie Clark (2)	Lead	Prince Edward Island

=== Sandra Schmirler Most Valuable Player Award ===
The Sandra Schmirler Most Valuable Player Award was awarded to the top player in the playoff round by members of the media in the Scotties Tournament of Hearts.

Name	Position	Team
Kelly Scott (2)	Skip	Canada

=== Joan Mead Builder Award ===
The Joan Mead Builder Award recognizes a builder in the sport of curling named in the honour of the late CBC curling producer Joan Mead.

Name	Contribution(s)
Muriel Fage	Past Canadian Curling Association president, curling volunteer

=== Ford Hot Shots ===
The Ford Hot Shots was a skills competition preceding the round robin of the tournament. Each competitor had to perform a series of shots with each shot scoring between 0 and 5 points depending on where the stone came to rest. The winner of this edition of the event would win a two-year lease on a Ford Edge.

Winner	Runner-Up	Score
(Northwest Territories) Kelli Turpin	(Alberta) Cori Bartel	19–11

=== Shot of the Week Award ===
The Shot of the Week Award was awarded to the curler who had been determined with the most outstanding shot during the tournament as voted on by TSN commentators.

Name	Position	Team
Jan Betker	Skip	Saskatchewan

== Qualification playdowns ==
Teams qualified for their provincial playdowns (to be played in late January/early February) are as follows:

=== Alberta ===
The Alberta Scotties Tournament of Hearts was held from Jan. 24 to 28th at the Grande Prairie Curling Club in Grande Prairie.

Skip	Curling Club	W	L
Cathy King	Saville Centre Curling Club	6	1
Cheryl Bernard	Calgary Winter Club	5	2
Crystal Webster	Grande Prairie Curling Club	4	3
Renée Sonnenberg	Grande Prairie Curling Club	4	3
Heather Rankin	Calgary Curling Club	3	4
Shannon Kleibrink	Calgary Winter Club	3	4
Atina Johnston	Saville Centre Curling Club	2	5
Deb Santos	Saville Centre Curling Club	2	5

Tie-breaker: Webster 7-5 Sonnenberg
Semi-final: Bernard 9-4 Webster
Final: Bernard 7-4 King

=== British Columbia ===
The BC Scotties Tournament of Hearts was held from Jan. 24 to 28th at the Kamloops Curling Club in Kamloops.

Skip	Curling Club	W	L
Kelley Law	Royal City Curling Club	6	1
Patti Knezevic	Prince George Curling Club	5	2
Allison MacInnes	Kamloops Curling Club	4	3
Pat Sanders	Victoria Curling Club	4	3
Ashleigh Clark	Richmond Curling Club	4	3
Jill Winters	Nelson Curling Club	2	5
Marla Mallett	Royal City Curling Club	2	5
Sandra Jenkins	Salmon Arm Curling Club	1	6

Tie-breaker: MacInnes 8-2 Clark; MacInnes 6-5 Sanders
Semi-final: Knezevic 8-5 MacInnes
Final: Law 10-4 Knezevic

Defending champion Kelly Scott will be representing Team Canada at the national Scotties Tournament of Hearts.

=== Manitoba ===
The Manitoba Scotties Tournament of Hearts was held from Jan. 24 to 28th at the Southern Manitoba Convention Centre Arena in Morris.

Red Group
Skip	Curling Club	W	L
Darcy Robertson	Fort Rouge Curling Club	6	1
Jennifer Jones	St. Vital Curling Club	5	2
Liza Park	Brandon Curling Club	5	2
Colleen Kilgallen	East St. Paul Curling Club	4	3
Barb Spencer	Fort Rouge Curling Club	3	4
Denise Podolski	Burntwood Curling Club	2	5
Maureen Bonar	Wheat City Curling Club	2	5
Chris Scalena	LaSalle Curling Club	1	6

Black Group
Skip	Curling Club	W	L
Shauna Streich	Fort Rouge Curling Club	5	2
Kristy Jenion	Valor Road Curling Club	5	2
Joelle Brown	Fort Rouge Curling Club	5	2
Linda Stewart	Bowsman Curling Club	4	3
Janet Harvey	Fort Rouge Curling Club	3	4
Bev Atkins	Manitou Curling Club	2	5
Jan Sandison	Springfield Curling Club	2	5
Terry Ursel	Plumas Curling Club	2	5

Tie-breakers: Jones 7-6 Park; Jenion 9-5 Brown
Red 1 vs. Black 1: Robertson 9-8 Streich
Red 2 vs. Black 2: Jones 9-8 Jenion
Semi-final: Jones 13-5 Streich
Final: Jones 9-6 Robertson

=== New Brunswick ===
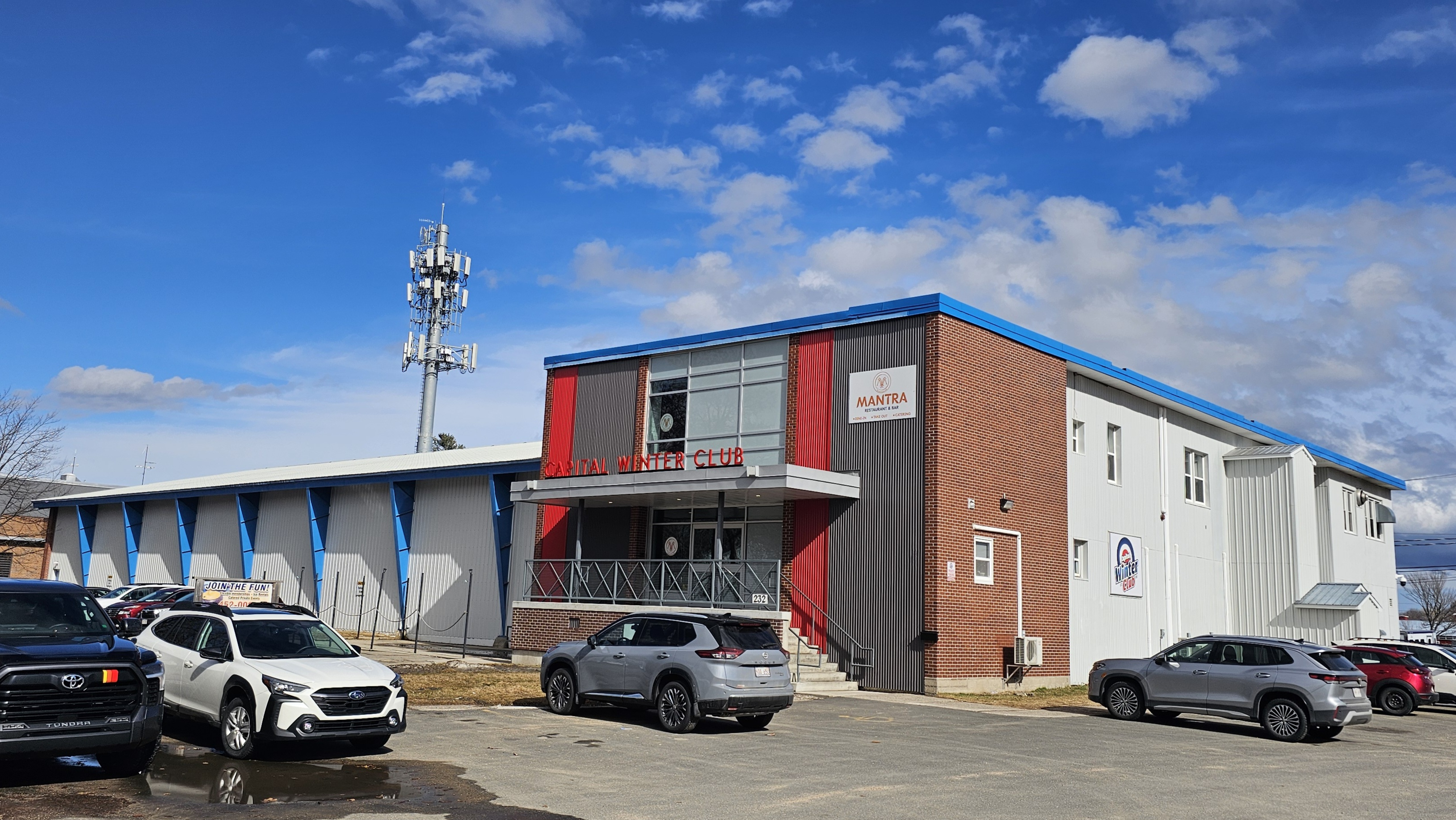
The Capital Winter Club in 2026

The New Brunswick Scotties Tournament of Hearts was held from Jan. 23 to 28th at the Capital Winter Club in Fredericton.

Skip	Curling Club	W	L
Sandy Comeau	Beaver Curling Club	8	1
Andrea Kelly	Capital Winter Club	7	2
Melissa Adams	Capital Winter Club	7	2
Heidi Hanlon	Thistle-St. Andrew Curling Club	6	3
Sylvie Robichaud	Curling Beauséjour Inc.	6	3
Valerie Hamende	Capital Winter Club	4	5
Karen Halcovitch	Beaver CC/Curling Beauséjour	3	6
Sharon Levesque	Capital Winter Club	2	7
Shelly Graham	Capital Winter Club	2	7
Susan McCarville	Thistle-St. Andrew Curling Club	0	9

Semi-final: Kelly 9-6 Adams
Final: Comeau 4-1 Kelly

=== Newfoundland and Labrador ===
The Newfoundland and Labrador Scotties Tournament of Hearts was held from Jan. 24 to 27th at the St. John's Curling Club in St. John's.

Skip	Curling Club	W	L
Heather Strong	St. John's Curling Club	3	1
Cathy Cunningham	St. John's Curling Club	3	1
Bobbie Sauder	St. John's Curling Club	0	4

Final: Strong 7-4 Cunningham

=== Nova Scotia ===
The Nova Scotia Scotties Tournament of Hearts was held from Jan. 23 to 28th at the Liverpool Curling Club in Liverpool.

Skip	Curling Club	W	L
Jill Mouzar	Mayflower Curling Club	7	0
Kay Zinck	Mayflower Curling Club	5	2
Mary-Anne Arsenault	Mayflower Curling Club	5	2
Gail Sinclair	Nova Scotia Curling Association	3	4
Nancy McConnery	Dartmouth Curling Club	3	4
Melanie Comstock	Mayflower Curling Club	2	5
Meaghan Smart	Mayflower Curling Club	2	5
Penny LaRocque	Mayflower Curling Club	1	6

Tie-breaker: Sinclair 6-5 McConnery
1 vs. 2: Mouzar 9-2 Zinck
3 vs. 4: Arsenault 8-4 Sinclair
Semi-final: Zinck 4-3 Arsenault
Final: Mouzar 4-2 Zinck

Defending champion Colleen Jones is playing third for Kay Zinck.

=== Ontario ===
The Ontario Scotties Tournament of Hearts was held from Jan. 22 to 28th at the Dixie Curling Club in Mississauga.

Skip	Curling Club	W	L
Jenn Hanna	Ottawa Curling Club	8	1
Krista Scharf	Fort William Curling Club	7	2
Alison Goring	Bayview Golf & Country Club	7	2
Sherry Middaugh	Coldwater & District Curling Club	5	4
Karen Bell	Brant Curling Club	4	5
Sara Harvey	Unionville Curling Club	4	5
Jo-Ann Rizzo	Brant Curling Club	4	5
Maggie Mazzuca	Copper Cliff Curling Club	3	6
Michelle Boland	Fort William Curling Club	3	6
Arynn Frantz	Coniston Curling Club	0	9

1 vs. 2: Scharf 11-5 Hanna
3 vs. 4: Middaugh 10-4 Goring
Semi-final: Middaugh 8-7 Hanna
Final: Scharf 7-5 Middaugh

=== Prince Edward Island ===
The PEI Scotties Tournament of Hearts was held from Jan. 18 to 22nd at the Western Community Curling Club in Alberton. Instead of a round robin format, a triple-knock out system was employed. No playoff was necessary as Gaudet went undefeated.

Skip	Curling Club	W	L
Suzanne Gaudet	Charlottetown Curling Club	7	0
Meaghan Hughes	Charlottetown Curling Club	4	3
Lori Robinson	Charlottetown Curling Club	4	3
Shelly Bradley	Charlottetown Curling Club	3	3
Rebecca Jean MacPhee	Charlottetown Curling Club	2	3
Karen Currie	Cornwall Curling Club	2	3
Donna Butler	Cornwall Curling Club	1	3
Krista Cameron	Silver Fox Curling and Yacht Club	1	3
Bev Beaton	Charlottetown Curling Club	0	3

=== Quebec ===
The Quebec Scotties Tournament of Hearts were held from Jan. 22 to 28th at the Sherbrooke Curling Club in Sherbrooke.

Group A
Skip	Curling Club	W	L
Brenda Nicholls	CC Etchemin / CC Victoria	6	1
Ève Bélisle	CC Longue-Pointe / Lachine CC	5	2
Véronique Brassard	CC Etchemin	5	2
Nathalie Gagnon	Riverbend CC / CC Kénogami	5	2
Joëlle Belley	Glenmore CC	3	4
Lise Gagné	CC Saint-Félicien	2	5
Barbara Hart	Montreal West CC	1	6
Keri Knox	Glenmore CC	1	6

Group B
Skip	Curling Club	W	L
Chantal Osborne	Thurso CC	6	1
Isabelle Néron	CC Kénogami / CC Chicoutimi	5	2
Marie-Josée Fortier	Cap-de-la-Madeleine CC	4	3
Genviève Frappier	CC Longue-Pointe	4	3
Denise Prévost	Cap-de-la-Madeleine CC	3	4
Nathalie Audet	CC Boucherville	2	5
Kim Beardsell	Valleyfield CC / CC Lacolle	2	5
Elaine deRyk	Town of Mount Royal CC	2	5

Tie-breakers: Bélisle 5-3 Gagnon; Bélisle 7-1 Brassard
A1 vs. B1: Osborne 12-6 Nicholls
A2 vs. B2: Bélisle 11-6 Néron
Semi-final: Nicholls 5-4 Bélisle
Final: Osborne 10-6 Nicholls

=== Saskatchewan ===
The Saskatchewan Scotties Tournament of Hearts was held from Jan. 31 to Feb. 4 at the Balgonie Curling Club in Balgonie.

Skip	Curling Club	W	L
Jan Betker	Callie Curling Club	6	1
Michelle Englot	Tartan Curling Club	5	2
Stefanie Lawton	CN Curling Club	5	2
Cathy Trowell	Yorkton Curling Club	3	4
Jolene McIvor	Callie Curling Club	3	4
Rene Miettinen	Muenster Curling Club	3	4
Tracy Streifel	Granite Curling Club	3	4
Wendy Thienes	Shaunavon Curling Club	0	7

Semi-final: Lawton 13-7 Englot
Final: Betker 9-6 Lawton

=== Yukon / Northwest Territories ===
The Yukon/Northwest Territories Women's Championship was held from Jan. 25 to 28th at the Whitehorse Curling Club in Whitehorse, Yukon. No playoffs occurred.

Skip	Curling Club	W	L
Kerry Koe	Yellowknife Curling Club	5	1
Sandra Mikkelson	Whitehorse Curling Club	3	3
Maureen Miller	Yellowknife Curling Club	3	3
Nicole Baldwin	Whitehorse Curling Club	1	5
