= 2015 New Brunswick Scotties Tournament of Hearts =

Curling competition at New Brunswick

- Host city: Fredericton Junction, New Brunswick
- Arena: Tri County Complex Arena
- Dates: January 29 – February 1
- Winner: Team Robichaud
- Curling club: Curl Moncton
- Skip: Sylvie Robichaud
- Third: Rebecca Atkinson
- Second: Marie Richard
- Lead: Jane Boyle
- Alternate: Carol Whitaker
- Finalist: Melissa Adams

The 2015 New Brunswick Scotties Tournament of Hearts, the provincial women's curling championship of New Brunswick, were held January 29 to February 1 at the Tri County Complex Arena in Fredericton Junction, New Brunswick. The winning Sylvie Robichaud team represented New Brunswick at the 2015 Scotties Tournament of Hearts in Moose Jaw and finished the round robin with a 4–7 record.

== Teams ==
The teams are listed as follows:

Skip	Third	Second	Lead	Alternate	Club(s)
Melissa Adams	Danielle Amos	Nicole Arsenault Bishop	Kendra Lister		Capital Winter Club, Fredericton
Sharon Levesque	Debbie McCann	Linda Smith	Christy Borglad	Valerie Lang	Gladstone Curling Club, Fredericton Junction
Sarah Mallais	Leah Thompson	Kaitlyn Veitch	Jade Carruthers		Thistle-St. Andrew's Curling Club, Saint John
Nicole McCann	Laurie Nason	Shelley Eastwood-Currier	Carol Charlton	Cathy McCann	Gladstone Curling Club, Fredericton Junction
Sylvie Robichaud	Rebecca Atkinson	Marie Richard	Jane Boyle	Carol Whitaker	Curl Moncton, Moncton
Shannon Tatlock	Jaclyn Crandall	Shelby Wilson	Emily MacRae		Curl Moncton, Moncton

== Round-robin standings ==
Key
Teams to Playoffs

Team	W	L
Robichaud	4	1
Adams	4	1
Tatlock	3	2
Mallais	3	2
McCann	1	4
Levesque	0	5

== Scores ==
=== January 29 ===
Draw 1

- Robichaud 7-3 Levesque
- Mallais 10-7 McCann
- Adams 7-5 Tatlock

Draw 2

- Tatlock 10-3 McCann
- Robichaud 6-5 Adams
- Malls 9-6 Levesque

=== January 30 ===
Draw 3

- Mallais 6-5 Tatlock
- Robichaud 10-7 McCann
- Adams 8-7 Levesque

Draw 4

- Adams 11-5 McCann
- Tatlcok 7-4 Levesque
- Robichaud 6-5 Mallais

=== January 31 ===
Draw 5

- McCann 8-5 Levesque
- Tatlock 6-5 Robichaud
- Adams 7-1 Mallais

=== Tie breaker ===
- Tatlock 7-6 Mallais

== Playoffs ==
Semifinal			Final
			1	Robichaud	7
2	Adams	7	2	Adams	6
3	Tatlock	4

=== Final ===
Team	1	2	3	4	5	6	7	8	9	10	Final
Sylvie Robichaud	2	0	0	1	0	2	0	0	0	2	7
Melissa Adams	0	0	2	0	3	0	0	1	0	0	6

2015 New Brunswick Scotties Tournament of Hearts

Sylvie Robichaud
2nd New Brunswick Provincial Championship title
