= 2015 Scotties Tournament of Hearts =

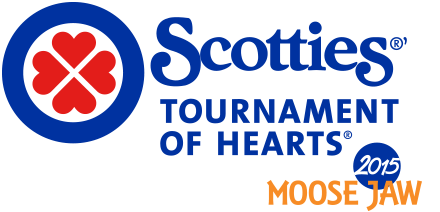
- Host city: Moose Jaw, Saskatchewan
- Arena: Mosaic Place
- Dates: February 14–22
- Attendance: 70,047
- Winner: Manitoba
- Curling club: St. Vital CC, Winnipeg
- Skip: Jennifer Jones
- Third: Kaitlyn Lawes
- Second: Jill Officer
- Lead: Dawn McEwen
- Alternate: Jennifer Clark-Rouire
- Coach: Wendy Morgan
- Finalist: Alberta (Val Sweeting)

The 2015 Scotties Tournament of Hearts was held from February 14 to 22 at Mosaic Place in Moose Jaw, Saskatchewan. The winners represented Canada at the 2015 World Women's Curling Championship held from March 14 to 22 at the Tsukisamu Gymnasium in Sapporo, Japan.

== Changes to competition format ==
Alongside the announcement of Moose Jaw as host in November 2013, it was announced that the tournament would expand to 15 teams, including Nunavut being invited to participate for the first time, Yukon and the Northwest Territories receiving separate berths (after having previously fielded a joint team), and Northern Ontario receiving a separate berth from southern Ontario (as has been the case in the Brier).

Ten teams were to advance directly to the main draw. The remaining would compete in a pre-tournament qualifier, with the top two teams advancing to the main draw. The team who finishes last in the round robin round of the main draw would be relegated to the pre-qualifier in the following year's tournament.

Nunavut would decline its invitation to the Scotties and Brier for 2015, with the pre-qualifier thus reformatted to use a play-in game

== Teams ==
After winning the 2013 & 2014 Scotties, Rachel Homan returns again as skip of Team Canada, this time with a new teammate in Joanne Courtney at second. She replaces Alison Kreviazuk who moved to Sweden to be with her partner, Fredrik Lindberg. Courtney played in the 2014 Scotties for Alberta's Val Sweeting rink who returns with a new third in Lori Olson-Johns. They were the silver medalists last year after having lost to Homan in the final. After missing the Scotties last year for the Olympics, where she received a gold medal, Jennifer Jones and her team from Manitoba look to capture her fifth Scotties title. The other favourite is Team Stefanie Lawton, representing Saskatchewan. Although they have never won the Scotties, they have placed 4th four times in previous Scotties tournaments. They are also three-time Canada Cup winners, four-time Grand Slam winners, and are playing on home ice in Saskatchewan.

The teams are listed as follows:

Canada	Alberta	British Columbia
Ottawa CC, Ottawa Skip: Rachel Homan; Third: Emma Miskew; Second: Joanne Courtney; Lead: Lisa Weagle; Alternate: Cheryl Kreviazuk	Saville SC, Edmonton Skip: Val Sweeting; Third: Lori Olson-Johns; Second: Dana Ferguson; Lead: Rachelle Brown; Alternate: Sarah Wilkes	Prince George CC, Prince George; Howe Sound CC, Squamish Skip: Patti Knezevic; Third: Kristen Fewster; Second: Jen Rusnell; Lead: Rhonda Camozzi; Alternate: Nicole Backe
Manitoba	New Brunswick	Newfoundland and Labrador
St. Vital CC, Winnipeg Skip: Jennifer Jones; Third: Kaitlyn Lawes; Second: Jill Officer; Lead: Dawn McEwen; Alternate: Jennifer Clark-Rouire	Curl Moncton, Moncton Skip: Sylvie Robichaud; Third: Rebecca Atkinson; Second: Marie Richard; Lead: Jane Boyle; Alternate: Carol Whitaker	Bally Haly G&CC, St. John's Skip: Heather Strong; Third: Stephanie Korab; Second: Jessica Cunningham; Lead: Kathryn Cooper; Alternate: Noelle Thomas-Kennell
Northern Ontario	Nova Scotia	Ontario
Idylwylde G&CC, Sudbury Skip: Tracy Horgan; Third: Jenn Horgan; Second: Jenna Enge; Lead: Amanda Gates; Alternate: Courtney Chenier	Mayflower CC, Halifax Skip: Mary-Anne Arsenault; Third: Christina Black; Second: Jane Snyder; Lead: Jenn Baxter; Alternate: Carole MacLean	Bayview CC, Thornhill Skip: Julie Hastings; Third: Christy Trombley; Second: Stacey Smith; Lead: Katrina Collins; Alternate: Cheryl McPherson
Prince Edward Island	Quebec	Saskatchewan
Charlottetown CC, Charlottetown Skip: Suzanne Birt; Third: Shelly Bradley; Second: Michelle McQuaid; Lead: Susan McInnis; Alternate: Sinead Dolan	Glenmore CC, Dollard-des-Ormeaux; CC Etchemin, Saint-Romuald Skip: Lauren Mann; Third: Amélie Blais; Second: Brittany O'Rourke; Lead: Anne-Marie Filteau; Alternate: Brenda Nicholls	Nutana CC, Saskatoon Skip: Stefanie Lawton; Third: Sherry Anderson; Second: Stephanie Schmidt; Lead: Marliese Kasner; Alternate: Lana Vey
Northwest Territories	Nunavut	Yukon
Yellowknife CC, Yellowknife Skip: Kerry Galusha; Third: Megan Cormier; Second: Danielle Derry; Lead: Shona Barbour; Alternate: Sharon Cormier	Declined invitation	Whitehorse CC, Whitehorse Skip: Sarah Koltun; Third: Chelsea Duncan; Second: Patty Wallingham; Lead: Jenna Duncan; Alternate: Lindsay Moldowan

=== CTRS ranking ===
Member Association (Skip)	Rank	Points
Manitoba (Jones)	1	173.105
Alberta (Sweeting)	2	169.430
Canada (Homan)	3	141.788
Ontario (Hastings)	9	55.525
Northern Ontario (Horgan)	10	54.360
Saskatchewan (Lawton/Anderson)	15	28.400
Quebec (Mann)	27	18.008
Nova Scotia (Arsenault)	46	6.500
British Columbia (Knezevic)	53	4.000
Yukon (Koltun)	85	0.825
New Brunswick (Robichaud)	NR	0.000
Newfoundland and Labrador (Strong)	NR	0.000
Northwest Territories (Galusha)	NR	0.000
Prince Edward Island (Birt)	NR	0.000

== Map of teams ==
Team Canada Provincial Winners

== Pre-qualifying competition ==
The pre-qualifying competition consisted of a single round robin between the three teams; the two teams with the best records advanced to a play-in game on February 14, whose winner advanced to the main draw.

=== Round robin standings ===
Locale	Skip	W	L	PF	PA	EW	EL	BE	SE	S%
Northern Ontario	Tracy Horgan	2	0	17	10	10	6	2	4	75
Northwest Territories	Kerry Galusha	1	1	16	20	8	12	0	0	70
Yukon	Sarah Koltun	0	2	15	18	9	9	2	2	76

=== Round robin results ===
All draw times are listed in Central Standard Time (UTC−6).

==== Draw 1 ====
Thursday, February 12, 7:00 pm

Sheet B	1	2	3	4	5	6	7	8	9	10	Final
Northwest Territories (Galusha) 🔨	1	0	0	0	2	0	0	2	0	X	5
Northern Ontario (Horgan)	0	2	2	2	0	1	2	0	1	X	10

==== Draw 2 ====
Friday, February 13, 8:00 am

Sheet B	1	2	3	4	5	6	7	8	9	10	Final
Northern Ontario (Horgan) 🔨	0	0	1	0	2	2	0	2	0	X	7
Yukon (Koltun)	0	0	0	2	0	0	2	0	1	X	5

==== Draw 3 ====
Friday, February 13, 3:30 pm

Sheet B	1	2	3	4	5	6	7	8	9	10	11	Final
Yukon (Koltun)	0	1	1	0	2	1	0	1	0	4	0	10
Northwest Territories (Galusha) 🔨	2	0	0	1	0	0	5	0	2	0	1	11

=== Pre-qualifying final ===
Saturday, February 14, 2:00 pm

Sheet B	1	2	3	4	5	6	7	8	9	10	Final
Northern Ontario (Horgan) 🔨	0	1	0	0	2	3	0	1	0	0	7
Northwest Territories (Galusha)	0	0	1	1	0	0	2	0	1	1	6

== Round robin standings ==
Final Round Robin Standings

Key
Teams to Playoffs
Relegated to 2016 Pre-qualifying competition

Locale	Skip	W	L	PF	PA	EW	EL	BE	SE	S%
Manitoba	Jennifer Jones	10	1	92	50	52	39	8	17	85%
Alberta	Val Sweeting	9	2	74	61	44	45	11	11	82%
Saskatchewan	Stefanie Lawton	8	3	65	43	49	35	20	16	82%
Canada	Rachel Homan	7	4	80	59	49	39	16	15	82%
Northern Ontario	Tracy Horgan	6	5	68	62	49	44	10	12	77%
Ontario	Julie Hastings	5	6	70	73	50	49	9	18	77%
Nova Scotia	Mary-Anne Arsenault	5	6	71	69	45	48	16	11	79%
Newfoundland and Labrador	Heather Strong	4	7	56	76	43	43	13	11	71%
Prince Edward Island	Suzanne Birt	4	7	61	70	43	45	13	12	76%
New Brunswick	Sylvie Robichaud	4	7	61	79	44	48	12	6	78%
Quebec	Lauren Mann	3	8	64	79	42	53	7	7	75%
British Columbia	Patti Knezevic	1	10	47	88	34	56	9	3	74%

== Round robin results ==
All draw times are listed in Central Standard Time (UTC−6).

=== Draw 1 ===
Saturday, February 14, 2:00 pm

Sheet A	1	2	3	4	5	6	7	8	9	10	Final
British Columbia (Knezevic) 🔨	0	0	0	0	1	0	1	0	X	X	2
Saskatchewan (Lawton)	1	2	1	1	0	2	0	1	X	X	8

Sheet C	1	2	3	4	5	6	7	8	9	10	Final
Canada (Homan) 🔨	0	2	0	2	1	0	0	1	0	X	6
Quebec (Mann)	0	0	1	0	0	1	0	0	2	X	4

Sheet D	1	2	3	4	5	6	7	8	9	10	Final
Nova Scotia (Arsenault)	0	0	4	0	0	0	3	0	5	X	12
Newfoundland and Labrador (Strong) 🔨	2	1	0	0	2	1	0	1	0	X	7

=== Draw 2 ===
Saturday, February 14, 7:00 pm

Sheet A	1	2	3	4	5	6	7	8	9	10	Final
New Brunswick (Robichaud)	0	0	0	0	0	2	0	0	X	X	2
Prince Edward Island (Birt) 🔨	0	0	0	2	3	0	1	2	X	X	8

Sheet B	1	2	3	4	5	6	7	8	9	10	Final
Manitoba (Jones)	1	0	2	0	3	0	0	0	0	1	7
Ontario (Hastings) 🔨	0	0	0	1	0	1	1	1	1	0	5

Sheet C	1	2	3	4	5	6	7	8	9	10	Final
Alberta (Sweeting) 🔨	2	1	0	0	0	0	2	0	0	1	6
Northern Ontario (Horgan)	0	0	0	2	0	0	0	1	1	0	4

Sheet D	1	2	3	4	5	6	7	8	9	10	Final
Saskatchewan (Lawton)	0	0	0	1	0	0	1	0	1	0	3
Canada (Homan) 🔨	0	2	0	0	2	0	0	1	0	1	6

=== Draw 3 ===
Sunday, February 15, 9:00 am

Sheet A	1	2	3	4	5	6	7	8	9	10	Final
Alberta (Sweeting) 🔨	2	0	0	1	0	1	0	2	0	0	6
Nova Scotia (Arsenault)	0	1	0	0	1	0	1	0	1	1	5

Sheet B	1	2	3	4	5	6	7	8	9	10	Final
Quebec (Mann) 🔨	0	1	1	0	1	2	1	2	X	X	8
British Columbia (Knezevic)	0	0	0	1	0	0	0	0	X	X	1

Sheet C	1	2	3	4	5	6	7	8	9	10	Final
New Brunswick (Robichaud) 🔨	1	0	0	0	0	1	1	1	0	0	4
Newfoundland and Labrador (Strong)	0	0	0	1	1	0	0	0	1	2	5

=== Draw 4 ===
Sunday, February 15, 2:00 pm

Sheet A	1	2	3	4	5	6	7	8	9	10	Final
Quebec (Mann)	0	0	3	0	0	1	0	2	0	X	6
Northern Ontario (Horgan) 🔨	2	1	0	2	1	0	3	0	1	X	10

Sheet B	1	2	3	4	5	6	7	8	9	10	Final
Newfoundland and Labrador (Strong) 🔨	1	0	3	0	1	0	1	0	1	X	7
Prince Edward Island (Birt)	0	1	0	1	0	1	0	1	0	X	4

Sheet C	1	2	3	4	5	6	7	8	9	10	11	Final
Ontario (Hastings) 🔨	0	1	0	2	0	0	0	3	1	0	1	8
Nova Scotia (Arsenault)	0	0	1	0	1	1	2	0	0	2	0	7

Sheet D	1	2	3	4	5	6	7	8	9	10	Final
Manitoba (Jones) 🔨	0	2	1	3	3	1	0	1	X	X	11
British Columbia (Knezevic)	1	0	0	0	0	0	1	0	X	X	2

=== Draw 5 ===
Sunday, February 15, 7:00 pm

Sheet A	1	2	3	4	5	6	7	8	9	10	Final
Canada (Homan) 🔨	0	0	3	0	2	0	2	0	1	2	10
Ontario (Hastings)	1	1	0	2	0	1	0	2	0	0	7

Sheet B	1	2	3	4	5	6	7	8	9	10	Final
Alberta (Sweeting) 🔨	3	0	2	1	3	0	1	0	X	X	10
New Brunswick (Robichaud)	0	2	0	0	0	1	0	1	X	X	4

Sheet C	1	2	3	4	5	6	7	8	9	10	Final
Manitoba (Jones) 🔨	2	1	0	0	0	1	0	2	0	1	7
Saskatchewan (Lawton)	0	0	0	0	2	0	1	0	1	0	4

Sheet D	1	2	3	4	5	6	7	8	9	10	Final
Northern Ontario (Horgan)	0	1	0	0	1	0	2	1	0	X	5
Prince Edward Island (Birt) 🔨	2	0	2	1	0	1	0	0	1	X	7

=== Draw 6 ===
Monday, February 16, 9:00 am

Sheet A	1	2	3	4	5	6	7	8	9	10	Final
Manitoba (Jones) 🔨	2	0	0	1	0	1	5	0	X	X	9
Newfoundland and Labrador (Strong)	0	1	0	0	1	0	0	1	X	X	3

Sheet B	1	2	3	4	5	6	7	8	9	10	Final
Nova Scotia (Arsenault)	0	1	0	0	0	1	0	2	0	X	4
Northern Ontario (Horgan) 🔨	2	0	0	2	1	0	2	0	1	X	8

Sheet C	1	2	3	4	5	6	7	8	9	10	Final
Prince Edward Island (Birt)	0	1	0	0	1	0	2	0	0	X	4
British Columbia (Knezevic) 🔨	1	0	0	1	0	1	0	2	2	X	7

Sheet D	1	2	3	4	5	6	7	8	9	10	Final
Ontario (Hastings)	0	2	0	1	0	0	2	1	0	0	6
Quebec (Mann) 🔨	1	0	0	0	1	2	0	0	1	0	5

=== Draw 7 ===
Monday, February 16, 2:00 pm

Sheet A	1	2	3	4	5	6	7	8	9	10	Final
Saskatchewan (Lawton) 🔨	0	2	1	1	1	0	2	0	1	X	8
Quebec (Mann)	0	0	0	0	0	2	0	1	0	X	3

Sheet B	1	2	3	4	5	6	7	8	9	10	Final
British Columbia (Knezevic)	0	0	1	0	0	0	0	2	X	X	3
Canada (Homan) 🔨	1	1	0	0	4	1	1	0	X	X	8

Sheet C	1	2	3	4	5	6	7	8	9	10	Final
Newfoundland and Labrador (Strong)	0	1	0	1	0	0	0	0	X	X	2
Alberta (Sweeting) 🔨	2	0	2	0	0	1	0	2	X	X	7

Sheet D	1	2	3	4	5	6	7	8	9	10	Final
New Brunswick (Robichaud)	0	0	0	1	0	0	1	0	2	0	4
Nova Scotia (Arsenault) 🔨	1	0	0	0	0	2	0	1	0	1	5

=== Draw 8 ===
Monday, February 16, 7:00 pm

Sheet A	1	2	3	4	5	6	7	8	9	10	Final
Northern Ontario (Horgan) 🔨	3	0	0	2	1	0	2	0	X	X	8
New Brunswick (Robichaud)	0	1	0	0	0	1	0	2	X	X	4

Sheet B	1	2	3	4	5	6	7	8	9	10	Final
Prince Edward Island (Birt)	0	0	0	1	1	0	1	0	2	0	5
Alberta (Sweeting) 🔨	0	0	3	0	0	1	0	1	0	1	6

Sheet C	1	2	3	4	5	6	7	8	9	10	Final
Saskatchewan (Lawton) 🔨	0	1	0	1	0	1	0	0	0	1	4
Ontario (Hastings)	0	0	1	0	1	0	0	1	0	0	3

Sheet D	1	2	3	4	5	6	7	8	9	10	11	Final
Canada (Homan)	1	0	1	0	2	0	0	2	0	1	0	7
Manitoba (Jones) 🔨	0	3	0	1	0	2	0	0	1	0	1	8

=== Draw 9 ===
Tuesday, February 17, 2:00 pm

Sheet A	1	2	3	4	5	6	7	8	9	10	Final
Ontario (Hastings)	0	2	0	2	0	1	0	2	2	X	9
British Columbia (Knezevic) 🔨	1	0	1	0	1	0	1	0	0	X	4

Sheet B	1	2	3	4	5	6	7	8	9	10	Final
Quebec (Mann) 🔨	0	1	0	0	0	1	0	1	X	X	3
Manitoba (Jones)	1	0	1	2	4	0	1	0	X	X	9

Sheet C	1	2	3	4	5	6	7	8	9	10	Final
Nova Scotia (Arsenault) 🔨	2	0	0	1	0	0	0	1	1	0	5
Prince Edward Island (Birt)	0	0	1	0	2	1	1	0	0	1	6

Sheet D	1	2	3	4	5	6	7	8	9	10	Final
Newfoundland and Labrador (Strong)	1	0	1	0	1	1	0	1	0	1	6
Northern Ontario (Horgan) 🔨	0	1	0	1	0	0	1	0	1	0	4

=== Draw 10 ===
Tuesday, February 17, 7:00 pm

Sheet A	1	2	3	4	5	6	7	8	9	10	Final
Newfoundland and Labrador (Strong) 🔨	0	0	0	3	0	0	0	2	X	X	5
Canada (Homan)	2	0	3	0	0	0	6	0	X	X	11

Sheet B	1	2	3	4	5	6	7	8	9	10	Final
Saskatchewan (Lawton) 🔨	0	0	2	0	1	0	1	0	0	2	6
Nova Scotia (Arsenault)	0	1	0	1	0	1	0	1	1	0	5

Sheet C	1	2	3	4	5	6	7	8	9	10	11	Final
Quebec (Mann)	0	3	0	1	0	1	0	0	3	0	0	8
New Brunswick (Robichaud) 🔨	2	0	1	0	2	0	1	1	0	1	1	9

Sheet D	1	2	3	4	5	6	7	8	9	10	Final
British Columbia (Knezevic) 🔨	0	0	2	0	2	0	1	0	0	X	5
Alberta (Sweeting)	0	1	0	3	0	3	0	0	3	X	10

=== Draw 11 ===
Wednesday, February 18, 9:00 am

Sheet A	1	2	3	4	5	6	7	8	9	10	Final
Nova Scotia (Arsenault) 🔨	1	0	2	0	2	0	0	3	0	1	9
Manitoba (Jones)	0	1	0	1	0	1	1	0	2	0	6

Sheet B	1	2	3	4	5	6	7	8	9	10	Final
Ontario (Hastings)	1	0	1	1	1	1	0	0	2	X	7
Newfoundland and Labrador (Strong) 🔨	0	1	0	0	0	0	2	1	0	X	4

Sheet C	1	2	3	4	5	6	7	8	9	10	Final
British Columbia (Knezevic) 🔨	0	2	0	1	0	2	0	0	0	X	5
Northern Ontario (Horgan)	1	0	1	0	2	0	1	1	1	X	7

Sheet D	1	2	3	4	5	6	7	8	9	10	Final
Quebec (Mann) 🔨	2	0	0	0	1	1	0	2	0	X	6
Prince Edward Island (Birt)	0	4	1	2	0	0	2	0	1	X	10

=== Draw 12 ===
Wednesday, February 18, 2:00 pm

Sheet A	1	2	3	4	5	6	7	8	9	10	Final
Quebec (Mann) 🔨	1	0	2	0	1	0	0	1	0	1	6
Alberta (Sweeting)	0	2	0	1	0	1	2	0	2	0	8

Sheet B	1	2	3	4	5	6	7	8	9	10	11	Final
New Brunswick (Robichaud) 🔨	2	0	1	0	2	0	1	0	1	0	1	8
British Columbia (Knezevic)	0	1	0	2	0	1	0	2	0	1	0	7

Sheet C	1	2	3	4	5	6	7	8	9	10	Final
Canada (Homan) 🔨	0	1	0	1	0	0	2	0	1	1	6
Nova Scotia (Arsenault)	0	0	2	0	0	4	0	1	0	0	7

Sheet D	1	2	3	4	5	6	7	8	9	10	Final
Saskatchewan (Lawton)	0	0	0	0	2	0	1	0	1	X	4
Newfoundland and Labrador (Strong) 🔨	0	0	1	1	0	0	0	0	0	X	2

=== Draw 13 ===
Wednesday, February 18, 7:00 pm

Sheet A	1	2	3	4	5	6	7	8	9	10	11	Final
Saskatchewan (Lawton)	0	0	1	0	1	0	1	1	0	1	0	5
Northern Ontario (Horgan) 🔨	1	0	0	1	0	2	0	0	1	0	1	6

Sheet B	1	2	3	4	5	6	7	8	9	10	Final
Canada (Homan) 🔨	0	2	0	1	0	3	0	1	2	X	9
Prince Edward Island (Birt)	0	0	1	0	1	0	3	0	0	X	5

Sheet C	1	2	3	4	5	6	7	8	9	10	Final
Ontario (Hastings) 🔨	0	0	2	1	0	0	0	1	1	X	5
Alberta (Sweeting)	1	3	0	0	1	1	2	0	0	X	8

Sheet D	1	2	3	4	5	6	7	8	9	10	Final
Manitoba (Jones) 🔨	3	0	1	0	3	0	1	0	1	0	9
New Brunswick (Robichaud)	0	2	0	2	0	1	0	1	0	1	7

=== Draw 14 ===
Thursday, February 19, 9:00 am

Sheet A	1	2	3	4	5	6	7	8	9	10	Final
British Columbia (Knezevic) 🔨	1	0	2	0	2	0	0	2	0	0	7
Newfoundland and Labrador (Strong)	0	2	0	1	0	1	2	0	2	2	10

Sheet B	1	2	3	4	5	6	7	8	9	10	Final
Nova Scotia (Arsenault)	0	0	2	1	0	0	1	1	2	0	7
Quebec (Mann) 🔨	0	1	0	0	3	3	0	0	0	1	8

Sheet C	1	2	3	4	5	6	7	8	9	10	Final
Prince Edward Island (Birt)	0	1	0	0	0	1	0	X	X	X	2
Manitoba (Jones) 🔨	3	0	1	3	2	0	1	X	X	X	10

Sheet D	1	2	3	4	5	6	7	8	9	10	Final
Northern Ontario (Horgan)	0	3	0	1	2	0	0	2	0	1	9
Ontario (Hastings) 🔨	1	0	2	0	0	2	1	0	1	0	7

=== Draw 15 ===
Thursday, February 19, 2:00 pm

Sheet A	1	2	3	4	5	6	7	8	9	10	Final
Prince Edward Island (Birt)	0	1	1	1	0	2	0	0	1	0	6
Ontario (Hastings) 🔨	0	0	0	0	2	0	2	2	0	2	8

Sheet B	1	2	3	4	5	6	7	8	9	10	Final
Northern Ontario (Horgan) 🔨	1	0	0	0	1	0	0	0	1	X	3
Manitoba (Jones)	0	0	2	1	0	3	0	0	0	X	6

Sheet C	1	2	3	4	5	6	7	8	9	10	Final
New Brunswick (Robichaud)	0	1	0	2	0	1	0	0	X	X	4
Saskatchewan (Lawton) 🔨	2	0	1	0	3	0	2	1	X	X	9

Sheet D	1	2	3	4	5	6	7	8	9	10	Final
Alberta (Sweeting)	1	0	2	0	0	1	0	1	0	2	7
Canada (Homan) 🔨	0	1	0	1	1	0	2	0	1	0	6

=== Draw 16 ===
Thursday, February 19, 7:00 pm

Sheet A	1	2	3	4	5	6	7	8	9	10	Final
Canada (Homan)	0	0	0	1	1	0	2	1	0	0	5
New Brunswick (Robichaud) 🔨	0	1	2	0	0	1	0	0	0	2	6

Sheet B	1	2	3	4	5	6	7	8	9	10	Final
Alberta (Sweeting)	0	0	1	0	0	0	0	0	X	X	1
Saskatchewan (Lawton) 🔨	2	1	0	2	1	2	0	1	X	X	9

Sheet C	1	2	3	4	5	6	7	8	9	10	Final
Newfoundland and Labrador (Strong)	0	1	0	1	1	0	1	0	1	X	5
Quebec (Mann) 🔨	1	0	2	0	0	2	0	2	0	X	7

Sheet D	1	2	3	4	5	6	7	8	9	10	Final
Nova Scotia (Arsenault)	0	2	0	0	2	0	0	0	0	1	5
British Columbia (Knezevic) 🔨	0	0	0	2	0	0	0	1	1	0	4

=== Draw 17 ===
Friday, February 20, 9:00 am

Sheet A	1	2	3	4	5	6	7	8	9	10	Final
Alberta (Sweeting)	0	2	0	0	0	2	0	1	X	X	5
Manitoba (Jones) 🔨	3	0	1	1	3	0	2	0	X	X	10

Sheet B	1	2	3	4	5	6	7	8	9	10	Final
Ontario (Hastings)	0	0	1	0	1	0	0	2	1	0	5
New Brunswick (Robichaud) 🔨	0	1	0	1	0	2	2	0	0	3	9

Sheet C	1	2	3	4	5	6	7	8	9	10	Final
Northern Ontario (Horgan) 🔨	0	1	1	1	0	1	0	0	0	X	4
Canada (Homan)	1	0	0	0	1	0	2	0	2	X	6

Sheet D	1	2	3	4	5	6	7	8	9	10	11	Final
Prince Edward Island (Birt)	1	0	0	2	0	0	0	0	0	1	0	4
Saskatchewan (Lawton) 🔨	0	2	1	0	0	0	1	0	0	0	1	5

== Playoffs ==
Page playoff system
1	Manitoba	8
2	Alberta	6
3	Saskatchewan	8
4	Canada	7

Semifinal
2	Alberta	7
3	Saskatchewan	6

Final
1	Manitoba	6
2	Alberta	5

Bronze Medal Game
3	Saskatchewan	5
4	Canada	7

=== 1 vs. 2 ===
Friday, February 20, 7:00 pm

Team	1	2	3	4	5	6	7	8	9	10	Final
Manitoba (Jones) 🔨	4	0	0	0	0	1	0	2	0	1	8
Alberta (Sweeting)	0	1	0	1	1	0	2	0	1	0	6

Player percentages
Manitoba		Alberta	
Dawn McEwen	93%	Rachelle Brown	93%
Jill Officer	83%	Dana Ferguson	80%
Kaitlyn Lawes	85%	Lori Olson-Johns	84%
Jennifer Jones	80%	Val Sweeting	79%
Total	85%	Total	84%

=== 3 vs. 4 ===
Saturday, February 21, 10:00 am

Team	1	2	3	4	5	6	7	8	9	10	11	Final
Saskatchewan (Lawton) 🔨	0	0	2	0	0	2	1	0	2	0	1	8
Canada (Homan)	0	0	0	2	1	0	0	2	0	2	0	7

Player percentages
Saskatchewan		Canada	
Marliese Kasner	76%	Lisa Weagle	93%
Stephanie Schmidt	88%	Joanne Courtney	82%
Sherry Anderson	83%	Emma Miskew	83%
Stefanie Lawton	83%	Rachel Homan	76%
Total	82%	Total	84%

=== Semifinal ===
Saturday, February 21, 3:00 pm

Team	1	2	3	4	5	6	7	8	9	10	Final
Alberta (Sweeting) 🔨	0	1	0	3	0	2	0	0	1	0	7
Saskatchewan (Lawton)	0	0	1	0	2	0	2	0	0	1	6

Player percentages
Alberta		Saskatchewan	
Rachelle Brown	80%	Marliese Kasner	81%
Dana Ferguson	90%	Stephanie Schmidt	81%
Lori Olson-Johns	75%	Sherry Anderson	91%
Val Sweeting	81%	Stefanie Lawton	73%
Total	84%	Total	82%

=== Bronze medal game ===
Sunday, February 22, 2:00 pm

Team	1	2	3	4	5	6	7	8	9	10	Final
Saskatchewan (Lawton) 🔨	1	0	1	0	1	0	0	1	1	0	5
Canada (Homan)	0	2	0	2	0	0	2	0	0	1	7

Player percentages
Saskatchewan		Canada	
Marliese Kasner	76%	Lisa Weagle	85%
Stephanie Schmidt	83%	Joanne Courtney	89%
Sherry Anderson	74%	Emma Miskew	85%
Stefanie Lawton	69%	Rachel Homan	90%
Total	75%	Total	87%

=== Final ===
Sunday, February 22, 7:00 pm

Team	1	2	3	4	5	6	7	8	9	10	Final
Manitoba (Jones) 🔨	2	0	0	1	0	1	0	1	0	1	6
Alberta (Sweeting)	0	2	0	0	1	0	1	0	1	0	5

Player percentages
Manitoba		Alberta	
Dawn McEwen	86%	Rachelle Brown	81%
Jill Officer	79%	Dana Ferguson	90%
Kaitlyn Lawes	78%	Lori Olson-Johns	91%
Jennifer Jones	85%	Val Sweeting	88%
Total	82%	Total	88%

== Statistics ==
=== Top 5 player percentages ===
Round robin only

Key
First All-Star Team
Second All-Star Team

Leads	%
(Manitoba) Dawn McEwen	90
(Canada) Lisa Weagle	88
(Nova Scotia) Jenn Baxter	86
(Saskatchewan) Marliese Kasner	85
(Alberta) Rachelle Brown	85

Seconds	%
(Manitoba) Jill Officer	86
(Saskatchewan) Stephanie Schmidt	82
(Alberta) Dana Ferguson	81
(Nova Scotia) Jane Snyder	81
(Canada) Joanne Courtney	80

Thirds	%
(Manitoba) Kaitlyn Lawes	84
(Alberta) Lori Olson-Johns	82
(Canada) Emma Miskew	81
(Ontario) Christy Trombley	80
(Saskatchewan) Sherry Anderson	79

Skips	%
(Saskatchewan) Stefanie Lawton	83
(Manitoba) Jennifer Jones	81
(Canada) Rachel Homan	80
(Alberta) Val Sweeting	79
(New Brunswick) Sylvie Robichaud	77

=== Perfect games ===
Player	Team	Position	Shots	Opponent
Dawn McEwen	Manitoba	Lead	12	British Columbia

== Awards ==
The awards and all-star teams are as follows:

All-Star Teams

First Team

- Skip: Stefanie Lawton, Saskatchewan
- Third: Kaitlyn Lawes, Manitoba
- Second: Jill Officer, Manitoba
- Lead: Dawn McEwen, Manitoba

Second Team

- Skip: Jennifer Jones, Manitoba
- Third: Lori Olson-Johns, Alberta
- Second: Stephanie Schmidt, Saskatchewan
- Lead: Lisa Weagle, Team Canada

Marj Mitchell Sportsmanship Award

- Sherry Anderson, Saskatchewan

Joan Mead Builder Award

- Bernadette McIntyre, volunteer, former chair and executive vice-chair of Scotties host committees

== Provincial and territorial playdowns ==
- 2015 Alberta Scotties Tournament of Hearts
- 2015 British Columbia Scotties Tournament of Hearts
- 2015 Manitoba Scotties Tournament of Hearts
- 2015 New Brunswick Scotties Tournament of Hearts
- 2015 Newfoundland and Labrador Scotties Tournament of Hearts
- 2015 Northern Ontario Scotties Tournament of Hearts
- 2015 Nova Scotia Scotties Tournament of Hearts
- 2015 Ontario Scotties Tournament of Hearts
- 2015 Prince Edward Island Scotties Tournament of Hearts
- 2015 Quebec Scotties Tournament of Hearts
- 2015 Saskatchewan Scotties Tournament of Hearts
- 2015 Northwest Territories Scotties Tournament of Hearts
