= Sylvie Quillian =

Canadian curler (born 1980)

- Curler
- Born: Sylvie Robichaud; June 18, 1980 (age 46); Moncton, New Brunswick

Team
- Curling club: Curl Moncton, Moncton, NB
- Skip: Sylvie Quillian
- Third: Jennifer Armstrong
- Second: Erin Carmody
- Lead: Katie Vandenborre

Curling career
- Member Association: New Brunswick
- Hearts: 6 (2008, 2015, 2016, 2018, 2022, 2023)
- Top CTRS ranking: 11th (2022–23)
Medal record
Representing New Brunswick
Scotties Tournament of Hearts
Bronze medal – third place	2022 Thunder Bay

Sylvie Quillian (born June 18, 1980, as Sylvie Robichaud) is a Canadian curler from Riverview, New Brunswick. She currently skips her own team out of Curl Moncton in Moncton. She has won five New Brunswick Scotties Tournament of Hearts and was the New Brunswick provincial junior champion from 1999 to 2001.

== Career ==
=== Juniors ===
Quillian skipped the New Brunswick team at three straight Canadian Junior Curling Championships from 1999 to 2001. She had a 6–6 sixth-place finish in 1999 and a 4–8 eleventh-place finish in 2000. Her best finish came in 2001 where she finished with a 7–5 record, just missing the playoffs.

=== Women's ===
Quillian won her first New Brunswick Scotties Tournament of Hearts in 2008 with teammates Danielle Nicholson, Marie Richard and Julie Carrier. At the 2008 Scotties Tournament of Hearts, her team finished in last place with a 1–10 record. She could not defend her title the next season, finishing 3–4 at the 2009 New Brunswick Scotties Tournament of Hearts. After once again not qualifying for the playoffs in 2010, Quillian and her rink of Nicholson, Richard and Kendra Lister finished 6–1 through the round robin of the 2011 New Brunswick Scotties Tournament of Hearts. They then defeated Rebecca Atkinson in the semifinal before losing the provincial final to Andrea Crawford 7–2. Her rink also qualified for the playoffs the following year, before losing in the semifinal to Mary Jane McGuire.

After another semifinal loss in 2013, Quillian made the provincial final again in 2014 where she once again faced Crawford. Up 7–6 in the last end, her team gave up two points and lost the match 8–7. She would finally win her second provincial title in 2015 where her new rink of Atkinson, Richard and Jane Boyle defeated Melissa Adams 7–6 in the provincial final. At the 2015 Scotties Tournament of Hearts in Moose Jaw, Saskatchewan, New Brunswick defeated higher seeds such as Ontario's Julie Hastings and Team Canada's Rachel Homan, ultimately finishing the round robin with a 4–7 record. Quillian was able to defend her title at the 2016 New Brunswick Scotties Tournament of Hearts, sending her to her third Canadian championship in Grand Prairie, Alberta. At the end of the round robin, New Brunswick was placed last with a 2–9 record, meaning they would be relegated to the pre-qualification event the following year. Also during the 2015–16 season, her team played in the 2015 GSOC Tour Challenge Tier 2 Grand Slam of Curling event, where they lost in the quarterfinals to Jamie Sinclair.

Quillian and her new rink of Jessica Ronalds, Nicole Arsenault Bishop and Michelle Majeau began the 2016–17 season by winning the 2016 Jim Sullivan Curling Classic. They would not however win the 2017 New Brunswick Scotties Tournament of Hearts, losing in a tiebreaker to Melissa Adams. After the season, Adams joined the team at third, with Arsenault Bishop remaining at second and Lister returning to play lead. It proved to be a successful move as the Quillian (Robichaud at the time) rink won the 2018 New Brunswick Scotties Tournament of Hearts. At the 2018 Scotties Tournament of Hearts, Quillian would have her most successful Scotties to date, finishing the new pool play format with a 4–3 record. This placed them fifth in their pool, not enough to qualify for the Championship Pool. The following season, the team would win the 2018 Tim Hortons Spitfire Arms Cash Spiel on the World Curling Tour. At provincials, they lost in the semifinal to Sarah Mallais. The following season they made the final of the 2020 New Brunswick Scotties Tournament of Hearts, before losing to the Crawford rink 6–3. After the season, Crawford's third Jennifer Armstrong moved to Saskatchewan and Quillian took her place at third on the team.

Due to the COVID-19 pandemic in New Brunswick, the 2021 provincial championship was cancelled. As the reigning provincial champions, Team Crawford was given the invitation to represent New Brunswick at the 2021 Scotties Tournament of Hearts, but they declined due to work and family commitments. Team Melissa Adams was then invited in their place, which they accepted.

Team Crawford played in five tour events during the 2021–22 season, performing well in all of them. In their first event, The Curling Store Cashspiel, the team reached the final where they lost to Nova Scotia's Christina Black upon giving up a stolen victory. They then lost in the final of the Steele Cup Cash two weeks later to the Melodie Forsythe rink. They would then secure two victories in their next two events, going undefeated to claim the titles of the Dave Jones Stanhope Simpson Insurance Mayflower Cashspiel and the Atlantic Superstore Monctonian Challenge. The team then had a semifinal finish at the Stu Sells 1824 Halifax Classic, dropping the semifinal game to Switzerland's Corrie Hürlimann.

The 2022 New Brunswick Scotties Tournament of Hearts was cancelled due to the pandemic and Team Crawford were selected to represent their province at the 2022 Scotties Tournament of Hearts in Thunder Bay, Ontario. At the Hearts, the team began the event with five straight wins, the most consecutive wins to start a Tournament of Hearts of any New Brunswick team. Team Crawford finished the round robin with a 6–2 record, qualifying for the playoff round over higher seeded teams such as Wild Card #2 (Chelsea Carey), Wild Card #3 (Emma Miskew) and Saskatchewan's Penny Barker. They then defeated the Northwest Territories' Kerry Galusha in the knockout round and upset Team Canada's Kerri Einarson to reach the 1 vs. 2 page playoff game, becoming the first New Brunswick team to reach the playoffs since Heidi Hanlon in 1991. They then lost to Northern Ontario's Krista McCarville in the 1 vs. 2 game and Canada's Einarson rink in the semifinal, earning the bronze medal from the event. After the event, the team announced they would be parting ways with second Jillian Babin due to her relocation to Ontario. They then announced on March 4, 2022, that Jill Brothers would be joining them as their new second.

With the 2022 PointsBet Invitational being held in Fredericton, Team Kelly qualified as the host team. In the first round, they lost to Jennifer Jones 9–5 and were eliminated. On tour, the team qualified for the playoffs in all six events they played in, however, did not win any titles. They began with back-to-back quarterfinal appearances at the 2022 Stu Sells Toronto Tankard and the 2022 Tour Challenge Tier 2 Slam event. They then reached two consecutive semifinals at the Lady Monctonian and the 2022 Stu Sells 1824 Halifax Classic. In November, they went undefeated at the Jim Sullivan Curling Classic until the final where they lost to Suzanne Birt. They then reached the quarterfinals of the DeKalb Superspiel. In the new year, the team continued their dominance in New Brunswick, going undefeated through the prelim and provincial championship to win the 2023 New Brunswick Scotties Tournament of Hearts. In the final, they beat Abby Burgess 10–5. This qualified them for the 2023 Scotties Tournament of Hearts in Kamloops, British Columbia. After much success in 2022, the team finished seventh in their pool at the Hearts with a 3–5 record, only managing wins against Wild Card #2, Newfoundland and Labrador and the Yukon. After the Scotties, Kelly announced she would be leaving the team to join the Krista McCarville rink out of Northern Ontario. Quillian then formed her own team with Sarah Mallais, Carol Webb and former teammate Jane Boyle for the 2023–24 season.

=== Mixed ===
Aside from women's play, Quillian has represented New Brunswick at three Canadian Mixed Curling Championships, skipping the team in all three occasions. In 2011, she finished in third, losing in the semifinals to Alberta. She would return in in 2013, losing a tiebreaker to Ontario and finishing in 4th place. Her most recent appearance was in 2026, where Quillian would lose to Nova Scotia in the final, finishing in 2nd place.

== Personal life ==
Quillian works as a financial controller for Brona Transport Ltd. She attended the Université de Moncton. She is married.

== Teams ==
Season	Skip	Third	Second	Lead
1998–99	Sylvie Robichaud	Marcia Chiasson	Nicole Arsenault	Marie Richard
1999–00	Sylvie Robichaud	Crissy Inman	Nicole Arsenault	Marie Richard
2007–08	Sylvie Robichaud	Carol Webb	Erin McCormack	Marie Richard
2004–05	Sylvie Robichaud	Heather McIntosh	Wendy Miller	Marie Richard
2007–08	Sylvie Robichaud	Danielle Nicholson	Marie Richard	Julie Carrier
2009–10	Sylvie Robichaud	Danielle Nicholson	Marie Richard	Kendra Dickison
2010–11	Sylvie Robichaud	Danielle Nicholson	Marie Richard	Kendra Dickison
2011–12	Sylvie Robichaud	Danielle Nicholson	Marie Richard	Kendra Lister
2012–13	Sylvie Robichaud	Danielle Amos	Marie Richard	Kendra Lister
2013–14	Sylvie Robichaud	Mary Jane McGuire	Megan McGuire	Marie Richard
2014–15	Sylvie Robichaud	Rebecca Atkinson	Marie Richard	Jane Boyle
2015–16	Sylvie Robichaud	Rebecca Atkinson	Marie Richard	Jane Boyle
2016–17	Sylvie Robichaud	Jessica Ronalds	Nicole Arsenault Bishop	Michelle Majeau
2017–18	Sylvie Robichaud	Melissa Adams	Nicole Arsenault Bishop	Kendra Lister
2018–19	Sylvie Robichaud	Melissa Adams	Nicole Arsenault Bishop	Kendra Lister
2019–20	Sylvie Quillian	Melissa Adams	Nicole Arsenault Bishop	Kendra Lister
2020–21	Andrea Crawford	Sylvie Quillian	Jillian Babin	Katie Forward
2021–22	Andrea Crawford	Sylvie Quillian	Jillian Babin	Katie Forward
2022–23	Andrea Kelly	Sylvie Quillian	Jill Brothers	Katie Forward
2023–24	Sylvie Quillian (Fourth)	Sarah Mallais (Skip)	Carol Webb	Jane Boyle
2024–25	Sylvie Quillian	Jennifer Armstrong	Erin Carmody	Katie Vandenborre
