= Emily MacRae =

Canadian curler

- Curler
- Born: March 30, 1989 (age 37); Halifax, Nova Scotia

Curling career
- Member Association: Nova Scotia (2006–07); New Brunswick (2009–2015)
- Top CTRS ranking: 67th (2014–15)

Emily Margaret MacRae (born March 30, 1989) is a Canadian curler from Fredericton, New Brunswick.

== Career ==
In 2007, MacRae represented Nova Scotia at the 2007 Canada Winter Games as lead for Katherine Hines. The team went 4–2 in the round robin, before losing in a tiebreaker to Saskatchewan 12–3.

MacRae won the New Brunswick Junior Championship in 2009 as lead for Ashley Howard. At the 2009 Canadian Junior Curling Championships, the team finished with a 5–7 record. She also won the 2011 Rodd Curling Classic on the World Curling Tour.

MacRae, playing lead for Shannon Tatlock, made the playoffs at provincials for the first time at the 2015 New Brunswick Scotties Tournament of Hearts where they lost in the semifinal to Melissa Adams. They made the playoffs the following year as well, but lost in the 3 vs 4 page playoff game.

== Personal life ==
MacRae is originally from Fall River, Nova Scotia. She began curling when she was ten years old at the Mayflower Curling Club. She later moved to Truro, Nova Scotia and currently works as a Sales manager.

== Teams ==
Season	Skip	Third	Second	Lead
2006–07	Katherine Hines	Danielle Parsons	Courtney Huestis	Emily MacRae
2008–09	Ashley Howard	Jillian Babin	Melissa Menzies	Emily MacRae
2009–10	Ashley Howard	Jaclyn Crandall	Melissa Menzies	Emily MacRae
2011–12	Melissa Adams	Jaclyn Crandall	Shannon Tatlock	Emily MacRae
2014–15	Shannon Tatlock	Jaclyn Crandall	Shelby Wilson	Emily MacRae
2015–16	Shannon Tatlock	Abby Burgess	Emily MacRae	Shelby Wilson
2016–17	Shannon Tatlock	Sandy Comeau	Emily MacRae	Shelby Wilson
