= Sandy Comeau =

Canadian curler

- Curler
- Other names: Sandy Gaudet
- Born: October 5, 1964 (age 62); Moncton, New Brunswick, Canada

Team
- Curling club: Curl Moncton, Moncton, NB
- Skip: Sandy Comeau
- Third: Shelley Thomas
- Second: Lynn LeBlanc
- Lead: Molly Boucher

Curling career
- Member Association: New Brunswick
- Hearts: 3 (1993, 2005, 2007)
- Top CTRS ranking: 20th (2004–05)

Sandy Comeau (born October 5, 1964) is a Canadian curler from Moncton, New Brunswick. She is a three-time New Brunswick Scotties champion.

== Career ==
Comeau made her first Scotties appearance in 1993 playing second for Nancy McConnery at the 1993 Scott Tournament of Hearts. The team included Leanne Perron and Denise Cormier as well. They finished with a 2–9 record, only beating Newfoundland and Labrador and Quebec. Comeau would not return to the national championship until 2005 where she skipped her own team. New Brunswick would qualify for the tiebreaker and would upset Team Canada's Colleen Jones before losing to Ontario's Jenn Hanna in the second round.

Comeau appeared at the 2006 Canada Cup of Curling where her team made the 3 vs 4 page playoff game before losing to Jennifer Jones. She would appear at the Scotties for a third time in 2007 skipping the New Brunswick team. She did not have the same success as in 2005, finishing last with a 1–10 record.

Comeau has played in three Canadian Mixed Curling Championship, as third for Wayne Tallon in 2003, Charlie Sullivan in 2004 and Scott Jones in 2009. Her best finish was a 6–5 in both 2003 and 2004.

After taking a break from competitive curling, Comeau won the club championship in 2019 and represented New Brunswick at the 2019 Canadian Curling Club Championships in Leduc, Alberta. Her team consisted of Shelley Thomas, Lynn LeBlanc and Molly Boucher. They finished with a 1–5 record, only beating Northern Ontario.

== Teams ==
Season	Skip	Third	Second	Lead
1992–93	Nancy McConnery	Leanne Perron	Sandy Comeau	Denise Cormier
2004–05	Sandy Comeau	Stacey Leger	Allison Farrell	Stacy Sampson
2005–06	Sandy Comeau	Stacey Leger	Allison Farrell	Carol Webb
2006–07	Sandy Comeau	Stacey Leger	Allison Farrell	Carol Webb
2008–09	Sandy Comeau	Jessica Ronalds	Shannon Williams	Pamela Nicol
2009–10	Melissa Adams	Sandy Comeau	Stacey Leger	Pamela Nicol
2010–11	Melissa Adams	Sandy Comeau	Stacey Leger	Sarah Berthelot
2011–12	Sandy Comeau	Stacey Leger	Carol Whitaker	Jane Boyle
2012–13	Sandy Comeau	Stacey Leger	Carol Whitaker	Jane Boyle
2016–17	Shannon Tatlock	Sandy Comeau	Emily MacRae	Shelby Wilson
2017–18	Shannon Tatlock	Sandy Comeau	Shelley Thomas	Lynn LeBlanc
2019–20	Sandy Comeau	Shelley Thomas	Lynn LeBlanc	Molly Boucher
