= Jane Boyle (curler) =

Canadian curler

- Curler
- Born: March 27, 1973 (age 53); Saint John, New Brunswick

Team
- Curling club: Thistle-St. Andrews CC, Saint John, NB

Curling career
- Member Association: New Brunswick
- Hearts: 5 (2007, 2013, 2014, 2015, 2016)
- Top CTRS ranking: 52nd (2015–16)

Jane Boyle (born March 27, 1973, in Saint John, New Brunswick) is a Canadian curler from Sussex, New Brunswick.

== Career ==
Boyle is a six time New Brunswick provincial mixed champion. She won her first provincial mixed title in 2004 playing lead for a team skipped by Terry Odishaw. Representing New Brunswick at the 2005 Canadian Mixed Curling Championship, the team just missed the playoffs with a 6–5 record. The rink won their second provincial mixed title in 2005, and represented in the 2006 Nationals finishing with a 6–5 record. The team won their third provincial title in 2006. Playing in the 2007 Canadian Mixed Curling Championship, the team finished the round robin in 2nd place with an 8–3 record. They then beat Manitoba and then Quebec in the final to claim the Canadian Mixed Curling Championship title. Boyle won her fourth provincial mixed title in 2010 playing lead for Charlie Sullivan. At the 2011 Canadian Mixed Curling Championship, they finished the round robin with a 7–4 record, but lost in a tiebreaker match. Boyle won her fifth provincial mixed title in 2012 playing lead for James Grattan. At the 2013 Canadian Mixed Curling Championship, they finished in 4th place with a 7–4 record.

She won her sixth title in 2019 playing lead for Grant Odishaw. They represented New Brunswick in the 2020 Canadian Mixed Curling Championship where they claimed the silver medal. They lost the final to Quebec.

Boyle won her first New Brunswick Scotties Tournament of Hearts in 2015 playing lead for Robichaud. She won her second Scotties provincial title in 2016 playing lead for Robichaud. She has played in three national Scotties Tournament of Hearts as an alternate. She played in the 2007 Scotties Tournament of Hearts for Sandy Comeau, and in both 2013 and 2014 for Andrea Crawford.

== Personal life ==
Boyle is employed as a civil engineer and is married to Chris Doherty.
