= Carol Webb =

Canadian curler (born 1982)

- Curler
- Other names: Carol Whitaker
- Born: Carol Webb; June 30, 1982 (age 44); Saint John, New Brunswick

Team
- Curling club: Thistle-St. Andrew's CC; Saint John, NB

Curling career
- Member Association: New Brunswick (1999–2001; 2003–2006; 2008–present); Prince Edward Island (2001–2002; 2006–2008); Newfoundland and Labrador (2002–2003)
- Hearts: 3 (2007, 2008, 2015)
- Top CTRS ranking: 53rd (2023–24)
Medal record
Women's curling
Representing Canada
World Junior Championships
Gold medal – first place	2001 Ogden
Bronze medal – third place	2002 Kelowna

Carol Webb (born June 30, 1982) is a Canadian curler.

== Career ==
Webb played for New Brunswick at the 1999 Canada Games, finishing in 10th place.

Webb played in three straight Canadian Junior Curling Championships from 2001 to 2003, all for different provinces. In 2001 she played third for Sylvie Robichaud on Team New Brunswick She was then asked to be the fifth on the Prince Edward Island team that went on to win the World Juniors. In 2002, while attending the University of Prince Edward Island, she played second for Suzanne Gaudet on Team Prince Edward Island. This team won the Junior championship that year and followed it up with a bronze medal at the 2002 World Junior Curling Championships. In 2003 she played third for Jennifer Guzzwell on Team Newfoundland and Labrador.

After juniors, Webb played in New Brunswick with Kathy Floyd and then with Sandy Comeau. In 2006, she was reunited with the Suzanne Gaudet team in Prince Edward Island. This team, which was the same as the National junior championship winning team in 2002 won the Prince Edward Island provincial championship in 2007 winning them the right to represent the province at the 2007 Scotties Tournament of Hearts. 2007 would mark Webb's first Hearts.

After Webb's second trip to the Scotties in two years and posting an impressive 83% she is returning to New Brunswick. Despite the excellent showing at the Scotties her team went a lackluster 3–8.

In 2008, Webb left the Gaudet team, and PEI to curl second for Rebecca Atkinson in New Brunswick. She joined up with Comeau once again in 2011.

== Personal life ==
Webb married Patrick Whitaker in October 2009 to become Carol Whitaker. She later changed her name back to Webb.
