= 2015 Nova Scotia Scotties Tournament of Hearts =

- Host city: Dartmouth, Nova Scotia
- Arena: Dartmouth Curling Club
- Dates: January 20–25
- Winner: Mary-Anne Arsenault
- Curling club: Mayflower CC, Halifax
- Skip: Mary-Anne Arsenault
- Third: Christina Black
- Second: Jane Snyder
- Lead: Jennifer Baxter
- Finalist: Theresa Breen

The 2015 Nova Scotia Scotties Tournament of Hearts, the provincial women's curling championship of Nova Scotia, was held from January 20 to 25 at the Dartmouth Curling Club in Dartmouth, Nova Scotia. The winning team represented Nova Scotia at the national level 2015 Scotties Tournament of Hearts in Moose Jaw, Saskatchewan.

== Teams ==
The teams are listed as follows:

Skip	Third	Second	Lead	Alternate	Club(s)
Mary-Anne Arsenault	Christina Black	Jane Snyder	Jennifer Baxter		Mayflower CC, Halifax
Theresa Breen	Tanya Hilliard	Jocelyn Adams	Amanda Simpson		Mayflower CC, Halifax
Margaret Cutcliffe	Sara Jane Arason	Courtney Smith	Virginia Jackson		Mayflower CC, Halifax
Kelly Backman	Kristen MacDiarmid	Jennifer Crouse	Karlee Jones		Dartmouth CC, Dartmouth
Nancy McConnery	Sara Spafford	Mackenzie Proctor	Julia Williams		CFB Halifax CC, Halifax
Jocelyn Nix	Julie McEvoy	Sheena Moore	Shelley Barker	Jill Thomas	Lakeshore CC, Lower Sackville
Danielle Parsons	Amanda Colter	Katrina MacKinnon	Laura Kennedy	Emily Dwyer	Mayflower CC, Halifax
Sarah Murphy	Mary Mattatall	Elizabeth Woodworth	Jenn Brine		Mayflower CC, Halifax

== Round robin standings ==
Final Round Robin Standings

Key
Teams to Playoffs
Teams to Tiebreaker

Skip	W	L
Theresa Breen (Mayflower)	7	0
Mary-Anne Arsenault (Mayflower)	5	2
Kelly Backman (Dartmouth)	4	3
Sarah Murphy (Mayflower)	4	3
Danielle Parsons (Mayflower)	3	4
Margaret Cutcliffe (Mayflower)	2	5
Nancy McConnery (CFB Halifax)	2	5
Jocelyn Nix (Lakeshore)	1	6

== Round robin results ==
=== Draw 1 ===
Wednesday, January 21, 1:00 pm

Team	1	2	3	4	5	6	7	8	9	10	Final
Theresa Breen	1	0	4	0	2	0	1	2	X	X	10
Margaret Cutcliffe	0	1	0	1	0	2	0	0	X	X	4

Team	1	2	3	4	5	6	7	8	9	10	Final
Kelly Backman	0	0	0	0	1	0	0	0	0	X	1
Nancy McConnery	0	0	0	2	0	0	2	1	2	X	7

Team	1	2	3	4	5	6	7	8	9	10	Final
Jocelyn Nix	0	1	0	0	1	0	2	0	0	X	4
Sarah Murphy	1	0	1	1	0	3	0	1	0	X	7

Team	1	2	3	4	5	6	7	8	9	10	Final
Mary-Anne Arsenault	1	0	0	2	0	2	0	1	1	1	8
Danielle Parsons	0	1	1	0	2	0	1	0	0	0	5

=== Draw 2 ===
Wednesday, January 21, 7:00 pm

Team	1	2	3	4	5	6	7	8	9	10	Final
Kelly Backman	0	0	0	2	0	1	1	0	1	1	6
Sarah Murphy	1	0	2	0	1	0	0	1	0	0	5

Team	1	2	3	4	5	6	7	8	9	10	Final
Mary-Anne Arsenault	2	0	2	0	1	1	0	1	2	X	9
Margaret Cutcliffe	0	1	0	1	0	0	1	0	0	X	3

Team	1	2	3	4	5	6	7	8	9	10	Final
Danielle Parsons	2	1	1	0	0	3	0	1	0	0	8
Theresa Breen	0	0	0	3	1	0	1	0	2	2	9

Team	1	2	3	4	5	6	7	8	9	10	Final
Nancy McConnery	1	0	2	0	2	1	0	1	0	2	9
Jocelyn Nix	0	1	0	1	0	0	1	0	2	0	5

=== Draw 3 ===
Thursday, January 22, 1:00 pm

Team	1	2	3	4	5	6	7	8	9	10	Final
Mary-Anne Arsenault	0	0	0	1	0	3	0	1	0	1	6
Nancy McConnery	0	0	0	0	2	0	0	0	2	0	4

Team	1	2	3	4	5	6	7	8	9	10	Final
Danielle Parsons	2	0	1	0	0	2	0	0	0	0	5
Jocelyn Nix	0	0	0	1	2	0	1	2	1	2	9

Team	1	2	3	4	5	6	7	8	9	10	Final
Kelly Backman	0	2	0	0	0	2	1	0	3	X	8
Margaret Cutcliffe	0	0	0	0	1	0	0	1	0	X	2

Team	1	2	3	4	5	6	7	8	9	10	Final
Theresa Breen	1	1	1	0	0	1	2	0	0	1	7
Sarah Murphy	0	0	0	1	1	0	0	2	2	0	6

=== Draw 4 ===
Thursday, January 22, 7:00 pm

Team	1	2	3	4	5	6	7	8	9	10	Final
Jocelyn Nix	0	2	0	2	0	0	0	3	1	0	8
Margaret Cutcliffe	1	0	1	0	2	4	1	0	0	1	10

Team	1	2	3	4	5	6	7	8	9	10	Final
Sarah Murphy	0	1	0	0	0	0	0	X	X	X	1
Mary-Anne Arsenault	1	0	1	1	1	1	2	X	X	X	7

Team	1	2	3	4	5	6	7	8	9	10	Final
Theresa Breen	2	3	1	2	0	1	X	X	X	X	9
Nancy McConnery	0	0	0	0	2	0	X	X	X	X	2

Team	1	2	3	4	5	6	7	8	9	10	Final
Kelly Backman	0	0	0	1	0	2	0	0	X	X	3
Danielle Parsons	1	1	1	0	2	0	2	1	X	X	8

=== Draw 5 ===
Friday, January 23, 1:00 pm

Team	1	2	3	4	5	6	7	8	9	10	Final
Danielle Parsons	3	0	1	0	6	X	X	X	X	X	10
Nancy McConnery	0	1	0	2	0	X	X	X	X	X	3

Team	1	2	3	4	5	6	7	8	9	10	Final
Theresa Breen	0	1	1	0	0	2	0	1	1	1	7
Kelly Backman	1	0	0	2	0	0	3	0	0	0	6

Team	1	2	3	4	5	6	7	8	9	10	Final
Jocelyn Nix	0	3	0	1	0	0	0	0	2	1	7
Mary-Anne Arsenault	3	0	2	0	0	0	2	1	0	0	8

Team	1	2	3	4	5	6	7	8	9	10	Final
Sarah Murphy	0	3	0	0	2	0	0	2	2	X	9
Margaret Cutcliffe	0	0	1	0	0	2	3	0	0	X	6

=== Draw 6 ===
Friday, January 23, 7:00 pm

Team	1	2	3	4	5	6	7	8	9	10	Final
Mary-Anne Arsenault	0	3	0	0	1	1	0	2	0	0	7
Theresa Breen	3	0	0	3	0	0	2	0	1	1	10

Team	1	2	3	4	5	6	7	8	9	10	Final
Nancy McConnery	1	1	0	0	0	0	0	X	X	X	2
Sarah Murphy	0	0	4	0	1	3	1	X	X	X	9

Team	1	2	3	4	5	6	7	8	9	10	Final
Margaret Cutcliffe	0	0	2	0	0	0	0	1	0	X	3
Danielle Parsons	2	1	0	0	2	1	1	0	1	X	8

Team	1	2	3	4	5	6	7	8	9	10	11	Final
Jocelyn Nix	0	0	2	0	0	2	1	1	0	1	0	7
Kelly Backman	1	3	0	1	0	0	0	0	2	0	2	9

=== Draw 7 ===
Saturday, January 24, 1:00 pm

Team	1	2	3	4	5	6	7	8	9	10	Final
Sarah Murphy	0	0	0	1	1	0	1	0	0	1	4
Danielle Parsons	0	0	1	0	0	1	0	1	0	0	3

Team	1	2	3	4	5	6	7	8	9	10	Final
Jocelyn Nix	0	0	1	0	1	0	1	0	X	X	3
Theresa Breen	1	1	0	3	0	1	0	3	X	X	9

Team	1	2	3	4	5	6	7	8	9	10	11	Final
Mary-Anne Arsenault	1	0	1	0	1	0	1	1	0	2	0	7
Kelly Backman	0	2	0	2	0	2	0	0	1	0	1	8

Team	1	2	3	4	5	6	7	8	9	10	Final
Margaret Cutcliffe	0	0	0	0	0	2	0	3	0	1	6
Nancy McConnery	0	0	0	1	1	0	2	0	1	0	5

== Tiebreaker ==
Saturday, January 24, 3:00 pm

Team	1	2	3	4	5	6	7	8	9	10	Final
Kelly Backman	0	0	2	2	0	2	1	0	1	1	9
Sarah Murphy	2	0	0	0	3	0	0	1	0	0	6

== Playoffs ==
Semifinal			Final
			1	Theresa Breen	5
2	Mary-Anne Arsenault	7	2	Mary-Anne Arsenault	7
3	Kelly Backman	3

=== Semifinal ===
Sunday, January 25, 9:00 am

Team	1	2	3	4	5	6	7	8	9	10	Final
Mary-Anne Arsenault	0	2	0	0	0	2	1	0	2	X	7
Kelly Backman	0	0	0	1	1	0	0	1	0	X	3

=== Final ===
Sunday, January 25, 2:00 pm

Team	1	2	3	4	5	6	7	8	9	10	Final
Theresa Breen	0	0	2	0	0	2	0	0	1	0	5
Mary-Anne Arsenault	0	0	0	0	2	0	1	1	0	3	7

2015 Nova Scotia Scotties Tournament of Hearts

Mary-Anne Arsenault
7th Nova Scotia Provincial Championship title
