= 2012 Nova Scotia Scotties Tournament of Hearts =

- Host city: Halifax, Nova Scotia
- Arena: CFB Halifax Curling Club
- Dates: January 25–29, 2012
- Winner: Team Smith-Dacey
- Curling club: CFB Halifax Curling Club, Halifax
- Skip: Heather Smith-Dacey
- Third: Danielle Parsons
- Second: Blisse Comstock
- Lead: Teri Lake
- Finalist: Mary Mattatall

The 2012 Nova Scotia Scotties Tournament of Hearts, Nova Scotia's women's provincial curling championship, was held from January 25 to 29 at the CFB Halifax Curling Club in Halifax, Nova Scotia. The winning team of Heather Smith-Dacey, represented Nova Scotia at the 2012 Scotties Tournament of Hearts in Red Deer, Alberta, where they finished with a 4-7 record.

== Teams ==
Skip	Third	Second	Lead	Club(s)
Mary-Anne Arsenault	Stephanie McVicar	Kim Kelly	Jennifer Baxter	Mayflower Curling Club, Halifax
Coralie Duchemin	Heidi Bishop	Patti Merrigan	Marcie Bungay	Sydney Curling Club, Sydney
Kelly MacIntosh	Jennifer Crouse	Julie McEvoy	Sheena Gilman	Dartmouth Curling Club, Dartmouth
Mary Mattatall	Angie Bryant	Lisa MacLeod	Hayley Clarke	Mayflower Curling Club, Halifax
Jocelyn Nix	Andrea Saulnier	Jill Alcoe-Holland	Julie Morley	Glooscap Curling Club, Kentville
Colleen Pinkney	Wendy Currie	Shelley MacNutt	Susan Creelman	Truro Curling Club, Truro
Sarah Rhyno	Jenn Brine	Christie Lang	Shelley Barker	CFB Halifax Curling Club, Halifax
Heather Smith-Dacey	Danielle Parsons	Blisse Comstock	Teri Lake	CFB Halifax Curling Club, Halifax

== Standings ==
Skip (Club)	W	L	PF	PA	Ends Won	Ends Lost	Blank Ends	Stolen Ends
Heather Smith-Dacey (CFB Halifax)	6	1	52	31	30	31	11	9
Mary Mattatall (Mayflower)	5	2	54	40	31	27	7	10
Colleen Pinkney (Truro)	4	3	45	39	26	22	6	9
Mary-Anne Arsenault (Mayflower)	4	3	42	44	31	29	7	12
Coralie Duchemin (Sydney)	3	4	46	47	27	32	8	8
Kelly MacIntosh (Dartmouth)	2	5	38	47	23	25	11	8
Jocelyn Nix (Glooscap)	2	5	36	51	27	30	2	6
Sarah Rhyno (CFB Halifax)	2	5	36	50	26	34	6	5

== Results ==
=== Draw 1 ===
January 25, 1:00 PM

Sheet 4	1	2	3	4	5	6	7	8	9	10	Final
Smith-Dacey 🔨	0	0	0	1	0	2	2	0	1	X	6
Rhyno	0	1	0	0	1	0	0	1	0	X	3

Sheet 1	1	2	3	4	5	6	7	8	9	10	Final
Pinkney 🔨	2	0	0	0	1	0	0	2	0	0	5
Duchemin	0	0	1	1	0	0	2	0	0	2	6

Sheet 2	1	2	3	4	5	6	7	8	9	10	Final
Arsenault 🔨	2	0	1	0	0	3	0	1	1	X	8
Nix	0	1	0	1	1	0	3	0	0	X	6

Sheet 3	1	2	3	4	5	6	7	8	9	10	Final
MacIntosh	0	0	2	1	2	1	0	0	1	0	7
Mattatall 🔨	0	1	0	0	0	0	2	3	0	2	8

=== Draw 2 ===
January 25, 7:00 PM

Sheet 1	1	2	3	4	5	6	7	8	9	10	Final
Arsenault 🔨	1	0	0	0	1	0	0	0	0	X	2
Mattatall	0	0	1	1	0	0	2	2	1	X	7

Sheet 2	1	2	3	4	5	6	7	8	9	10	Final
Smith-Dacey	0	3	0	0	1	1	1	0	3	X	9
Duchemin 🔨	3	0	0	2	0	0	0	0	0	X	5

Sheet 3	1	2	3	4	5	6	7	8	9	10	Final
Rhyno	0	0	0	2	1	0	1	0	X	X	4
Pinkney 🔨	2	1	1	0	0	3	0	2	X	X	9

Sheet 4	1	2	3	4	5	6	7	8	9	10	Final
Nix 🔨	1	0	2	0	2	0	2	0	0	X	7
MacIntosh	0	1	0	1	0	1	0	0	2	X	5

=== Draw 3 ===
January 26, 1:00 PM

Sheet 1	1	2	3	4	5	6	7	8	9	10	Final
Nix 🔨	0	0	1	0	0	1	0	X	X	X	2
Smith-Dacey	0	1	0	3	2	0	2	X	X	X	8

Sheet 2	1	2	3	4	5	6	7	8	9	10	Final
Rhyno 🔨	0	1	3	0	0	0	0	0	2	X	6
MacIntosh	1	0	0	0	3	1	1	3	0	X	9

Sheet 3	1	2	3	4	5	6	7	8	9	10	Final
Arsenault 🔨	0	0	1	1	2	1	2	0	1	1	9
Duchemin	1	3	0	0	0	0	0	3	0	0	7

Sheet 4	1	2	3	4	5	6	7	8	9	10	Final
Pinkney 🔨	0	3	0	2	0	0	0	1	0	0	6
Mattatall	0	0	2	0	1	2	1	0	0	1	7

=== Draw 4 ===
January 26, 7:00 PM

Sheet 1	1	2	3	4	5	6	7	8	9	10	Final
Duchemin 🔨	0	2	1	0	0	0	1	1	1	X	6
MacIntosh	1	0	0	0	2	0	0	0	0	X	3

Sheet 2	1	2	3	4	5	6	7	8	9	10	Final
Mattatall 🔨	1	0	3	0	1	0	0	0	3	0	8
Smith-Dacey	0	2	0	1	0	1	1	1	0	3	9

Sheet 3	1	2	3	4	5	6	7	8	9	10	Final
Pinkney 🔨	0	1	0	1	1	0	1	1	1	1	7
Nix	1	0	1	0	0	3	0	0	0	0	5

Sheet 4	1	2	3	4	5	6	7	8	9	10	11	Final
Arsenault 🔨	0	2	0	0	1	0	1	0	2	0	1	7
Rhyno	0	0	1	1	0	0	0	2	0	2	0	6

=== Draw 5 ===
January 27, 1:00 PM

Sheet 1	1	2	3	4	5	6	7	8	9	10	Final
Rhyno	0	1	0	1	0	0	0	0	0	X	2
Nix 🔨	1	0	1	0	1	1	1	1	1	X	7

Sheet 2	1	2	3	4	5	6	7	8	9	10	Final
Pinkney 🔨	1	2	0	0	2	0	1	2	0	X	8
Arsenault	0	0	2	1	0	1	0	0	2	X	6

Sheet 3	1	2	3	4	5	6	7	8	9	10	Final
MacIntosh 🔨	0	3	0	0	2	0	1	0	0	1	7
Smith-Dacey	0	0	1	0	0	3	0	2	0	0	6

Sheet 4	1	2	3	4	5	6	7	8	9	10	Final
Mattatall 🔨	1	0	0	0	1	0	2	2	0	1	7
Duchemin	0	0	2	1	0	1	0	0	2	0	6

=== Draw 6 ===
January 27, 7:00 PM

Sheet 1	1	2	3	4	5	6	7	8	9	10	Final
Smith-Dacey	0	0	3	0	3	0	2	X	X	X	8
Pinkney 🔨	1	0	0	1	0	1	0	X	X	X	3

Sheet 2	1	2	3	4	5	6	7	8	9	10	Final
Nix 🔨	2	0	1	0	0	0	X	X	X	X	3
Mattatall	0	3	0	3	4	1	X	X	X	X	11

Sheet 3	1	2	3	4	5	6	7	8	9	10	Final
Duchemin	0	1	0	2	0	1	0	1	1	0	6
Rhyno 🔨	2	0	2	0	1	0	2	0	0	1	8

Sheet 4	1	2	3	4	5	6	7	8	9	10	Final
MacIntosh	0	0	1	0	0	0	1	0	2	0	4
Arsenault 🔨	2	0	0	1	1	1	0	1	0	1	7

=== Draw 7 ===
January 28, 9:00 AM

Sheet 1	1	2	3	4	5	6	7	8	9	10	Final
Mattatall	1	0	2	0	0	2	0	0	1	0	6
Rhyno 🔨	0	2	0	1	0	0	2	1	0	1	7

Sheet 2	1	2	3	4	5	6	7	8	9	10	Final
MacIntosh 🔨	0	1	0	0	0	1	0	1	0	X	3
Pinkney	2	0	1	0	1	0	2	0	1	X	7

Sheet 3	1	2	3	4	5	6	7	8	9	10	Final
Smith-Dacey 🔨	0	1	0	1	1	0	0	2	1	X	6
Arsenault	0	0	0	0	0	2	1	0	0	X	3

Sheet 4	1	2	3	4	5	6	7	8	9	10	Final
Duchemin	0	2	0	0	2	0	4	0	2	X	10
Nix 🔨	1	0	2	1	0	1	0	1	0	X	6

=== Tiebreaker ===
January 28, 7:00 PM

Sheet 1	1	2	3	4	5	6	7	8	9	10	Final
Arsenault	0	1	0	0	2	0	0	3	0	X	6
Pinkney 🔨	1	0	2	0	0	2	4	0	1	X	10

== Playoffs ==
Semifinal			Final
			1	Heather Smith-Dacey	7
2	Mary Mattatall	7	2	Mary Mattatall	6
3	Colleen Pinkney	5

=== Semifinal ===
January 29, 9:00 AM

Team	1	2	3	4	5	6	7	8	9	10	Final
Mattatall 🔨	0	1	1	0	0	0	3	0	1	1	7
Pinkney	1	0	0	1	0	2	0	1	0	0	5

=== Final ===
January 29, 3:00 PM

Team	1	2	3	4	5	6	7	8	9	10	Final
Smith-Dacey 🔨	1	0	1	0	1	0	1	3	0	0	7
Mattatall	0	1	0	1	0	1	0	0	1	2	6

2012 Nova Scotia Scotties Tournament of Hearts

Heather Smith-Dacey
Nova Scotia Provincial Championship title

== Qualification rounds ==
=== Round 1 ===
The first qualification round for the 2012 Nova Scotties Tournament of Hearts took place from December 9 to 11, 2011 at the Wolfville Curling Club in Wolfville, Nova Scotia. The format of play was an open-entry triple knockout qualifying six teams to the provincial playoffs

==== Teams ====
Skip	Third	Second	Lead	Alternate	Club(s)
Mary-Anne Arsenault	Stephanie McVicar	Kim Kelly	Jennifer Baxter		Mayflower Curling Club, Halifax
Theresa Breen	Amanda Simpson	Jocelyn Adams	Kelly Anderson		Mayflower Curling Club, Halifax
Marie Christianson	Kristen MacDiarmid	Christina Black	Jane Snyder		CFB Halifax Curling Club, Halifax
Margaret Cutcliffe	Sara Jane Arason	Karen Jay	Jill Linquist		Mayflower Curling Club, Halifax
Tanya Hilliard	Liz Woodworth	Jill Thomas	Kaitlin Fralic		CFB Halifax Curling Club, Halifax
Colleen Jones	Nancy Delahunt	Marsha Sobey	Mary Sue Radford		Mayflower Curling Club, Halifax
Kelly MacIntosh	Jennifer Crouse	Julie McEvoy	Sheena Gilman		Dartmouth Curling Club, Dartmouth
Mary Mattatall	Angie Bryant	Lisa MacLeod	Hayley Clarke		Mayflower Curling Club, Halifax
Jocelyn Nix	Andrea Saulnier	Heather Ross	Julie Morley		Glooscap Curling Club, Kentville
Colleen Pinkney	Wendy Currie	Shelley MacNutt	Susan Creelman	Karen Hennigar	Truro Curling Club, Truro
Sarah Rhyno	Jennifer Brine	Christie Lang	Shelley Barker		CFB Halifax Curling Club, Halifax
Coralie Richard	Heidi Bishop	Patti Merrigan	Marcie Bungay		Sydney Curling Club, Sydney
Gail Sinclair	Alexis Sinclair	Louane LeBlanc	Audra Gallant	Jackie Foster	Chester Curling Club, Chester
Heather Smith-Dacey	Danielle Parsons	Blisse Comstock	Teri Lake		CFB Halifax Curling Club, Halifax

==== A Event ====
First Knockout		Semifinals		Qualifier 1
		Heather Smith-Dacey	9
Mary Mattatall	5	Mary Mattatall	7
Coralie Richard	4			Heather Smith-Dacey	6
Marie Christianson	11			Jocelyn Nix	5
Gail Sinclair	4	Marie Christianson	6
Theresa Breen	5	Jocelyn Nix	7
Jocelyn Nix	6

First Knockout		Semifinals		Qualifier 2
		Mary-Anne Arsenault	8
Colleen Pinkney	6	Colleen Pinkney	2
Tanya Hilliard	2			Mary-Anne Arsenault	6
Kelly MacIntosh	8			Kelly MacIntosh	8
Margaret Cutcliffe	7	Kelly MacIntosh	12
Colleen Jones	0	Sarah Rhyno	2
Sarah Rhyno	8

==== B Event ====
Second Knockout
Coralie Richard	4
Gail Sinclair	5

Quarterfinals
Theresa Breen	6
Colleen Pinkney	7
Sarah Rhyno	9
Gail Sinclair	6

Semifinals
Colleen Pinkney	5
Sarah Rhyno	4

Qualifier 3
Jocelyn Nix	7
Colleen Pinkney	11

Second Knockout
Tanya Hilliard	4
Margaret Cutcliffe	5

Quarterfinals
Colleen Jones	6
Mary Mattatall	8
Marie Christianson	8
Margaret Cutcliffe	7

Semifinals
Mary Mattatall	6
Marie Christianson	7

Qualifier 4
Mary-Anne Arsenault	9
Marie Christianson	2

==== C Event ====
Third Knockout		Quarterfinals		Semifinals		Qualifier 5
				Sarah Rhyno	8
				Colleen Jones	6
		Margaret Cutcliffe	4
Coralie Richard	5	Colleen Jones	5
Colleen Jones	7					Marie Christianson	5
						Sarah Rhyno	7

Third Knockout		Quarterfinals		Semifinals		Qualifier 6
				Mary Mattatall	8
				Gail Sinclair	5
		Gail Sinclair	10
Tanya Hilliard	2	Theresa Breen	1
Theresa Breen	9					Jocelyn Nix	2
						Mary Mattatall	7

=== Round 2 ===
The second qualification round for the 2012 Nova Scotties Tournament of Hearts took place from January 6 to 8 at the Bridgetown Curling Club in Bridgetown, Nova Scotia. The format of play was an open-entry double knockout qualifying two teams to the provincial playoffs.

==== Teams ====
Skip	Third	Second	Lead	Alternate	Club(s)
Theresa Breen	Amanda Simpson	Jocelyn Adams	Kelly Anderson		Mayflower Curling Club, Halifax
Marie Christianson	Kristen MacDiarmid	Christina Black	Jane Snyder	Katarina Hakansson	CFB Halifax Curling Club, Halifax
Margaret Cutcliffe	Sara Jane Arason	Karen Jay	Jill Linquist		Mayflower Curling Club, Halifax
Coralie Duchemin	Heidi Bishop	Patti Merrigan	Marcie Bungay		Sydney Curling Club, Sydney
Tanya Hilliard	Liz Woodworth	Jill Thomas	Kaitlin Fralic		CFB Halifax Curling Club, Halifax
Colleen Jones	Tara Legay	Marsha Sobey	Mary Sue Radford	Nancy Delahunt	Mayflower Curling Club, Halifax
Jocelyn Nix	Andrea Saulnier	Jill Alcoe-Holland	Julie Morley		Glooscap Curling Club, Kentville
Gail Sinclair	Alexis Sinclair	Louane LeBlanc	Audra Gallant	Jackie Foster	Chester Curling Club, Chester

==== A-Event ====
First Knockout
Colleen Jones	3
Jocelyn Nix	6
Theresa Breen	7
Gail Sinclair	4
Marie Christianson	5
Margaret Cutcliffe	3
Coralie Duchemin	9
Tanya Hilliard	4

Semifinals
Jocelyn Nix	4
Theresa Breen	6
Marie Christianson	5
Coralie Duchemin	7

Qualifier 1
Theresa Breen	5
Coralie Duchemin	10

==== B-Event ====
Second Knockout
Colleen Jones	10
Gail Sinclair	3
Margaret Cutcliffe	7
Tanya Hilliard	4

Quarterfinals
Marie Christianson	8
Colleen Jones	7
Jocelyn Nix	9
Margaret Cutcliffe	3

Semifinals
Marie Christianson	4
Jocelyn Nix	8

Qualifier 2
Theresa Breen	6
Jocelyn Nix	7
