= 2010 Nova Scotia Scotties Tournament of Hearts =

- Host city: Liverpool, Nova Scotia
- Arena: Liverpool Curling Club
- Dates: January 5–10, 2010
- Winner: Team McConnery
- Curling club: Dartmouth CC, Dartmouth
- Skip: Nancy McConnery
- Third: Jennifer Crouse
- Second: Sheena Gilman
- Lead: Jill Thomas
- Finalist: Mary-Anne Arsenault

The 2010 Nova Scotia Scotties Tournament of Hearts was held January 5–10 at the Liverpool Curling Club in Liverpool, Nova Scotia. The winning team of Nancy McConnery represented Nova Scotia at the 2010 Scotties Tournament of Hearts in Sault Ste. Marie, Ontario, where they finished round robin with a 1–10 record.

== Teams ==
| Skip | Third | Second | Lead | Club |
|---|---|---|---|---|
| Mary-Anne Arsenault | Marie Christianson | Jennifer Baxter | Kelly MacIntosh | Nova Scotia Curling Association |
| Margaret Cutcliffe | Sara Jane Arason | Edie Lloyd | Jill Linquist | Mayflower Curling Club, Halifax |
| Tanya Hilliard | Christina Black | Elizabeth Woodworth | Kaitlin Fralic | Mayflower Curling Club, Halifax |
| Nancy McConnery | Jennifer Crouse | Sheena Gilman | Jill Thomas | Dartmouth Curling Club, Dartmouth |
| Jill Mouzar | Heather Smith-Dacey | Blisse Comstock | Teri Lake | Mayflower Curling Club, Halifax |
| Jocelyn Nix | Lisa DePaoli | Andrea Saulnier | Julie Morley | Glooscap Curling Club, Kentville |
| Colleen Pinkney | Wendy Currie | Karen Hennigar | Susan Creelman | Truro Curling Club, Truro |
| Sarah Rhyno | Jenn Brine | Jessica Bradford | Samantha Carey | CFB Halifax Curling Club, Halifax |

== Standings ==
| Skip (Club) | W | L | PF | PA | Ends Won | Ends Lost | Blank Ends | Stolen Ends |
|---|---|---|---|---|---|---|---|---|
| Mary-Anne Arsenault (NSCA) | 5 | 2 | 48 | 37 | 30 | 27 | 9 | 10 |
| Nancy McConnery (Dartmouth) | 5 | 2 | 45 | 34 | 29 | 25 | 11 | 8 |
| Sarah Rhyno (Halifax) | 4 | 3 | 44 | 38 | 23 | 25 | 13 | 6 |
| Jill Mouzar (Mayflower) | 4 | 3 | 38 | 37 | 25 | 25 | 8 | 6 |
| Margaret Cutcliffe (Mayflower) | 3 | 4 | 43 | 44 | 32 | 26 | 8 | 9 |
| Jocelyn Nix (Glooscap) | 3 | 4 | 42 | 45 | 25 | 27 | 9 | 6 |
| Colleen Pinkney (Turo) | 3 | 4 | 41 | 45 | 26 | 27 | 4 | 7 |
| Tanya Hilliard (Mayflower) | 1 | 6 | 24 | 53 | 18 | 30 | 11 | 2 |

== Results ==
=== Draw 1 ===
January 6, 1:00 PM

| Sheet 1 | 1 | 2 | 3 | 4 | 5 | 6 | 7 | 8 | 9 | 10 | Final |
|---|---|---|---|---|---|---|---|---|---|---|---|
| Arsenault 🔨 | 2 | 1 | 0 | 0 | 0 | 3 | 4 | X | X | X | 10 |
| Nix | 0 | 0 | 1 | 0 | 0 | 0 | 0 | X | X | X | 2 |

| Sheet 2 | 1 | 2 | 3 | 4 | 5 | 6 | 7 | 8 | 9 | 10 | Final |
|---|---|---|---|---|---|---|---|---|---|---|---|
| Mouzar | 0 | 0 | 0 | 2 | 0 | 2 | 0 | 0 | 2 | X | 6 |
| Cutcliffe 🔨 | 0 | 1 | 1 | 0 | 1 | 0 | 0 | 1 | 0 | X | 4 |

| Sheet 3 | 1 | 2 | 3 | 4 | 5 | 6 | 7 | 8 | 9 | 10 | Final |
|---|---|---|---|---|---|---|---|---|---|---|---|
| McConnery 🔨 | 0 | 0 | 1 | 0 | 1 | 0 | 0 | 1 | 2 | X | 5 |
| Rhyno | 0 | 0 | 0 | 2 | 0 | 0 | 1 | 0 | 0 | X | 3 |

| Sheet 4 | 1 | 2 | 3 | 4 | 5 | 6 | 7 | 8 | 9 | 10 | Final |
|---|---|---|---|---|---|---|---|---|---|---|---|
| Pinkery 🔨 | 1 | 0 | 0 | 0 | 3 | 2 | 3 | X | X | X | 10 |
| Hillard | 0 | 0 | 0 | 1 | 0 | 0 | 0 | X | X | X | 1 |

=== Draw 2 ===
January 6, 7:00 PM

| Sheet 1 | 1 | 2 | 3 | 4 | 5 | 6 | 7 | 8 | 9 | 10 | Final |
|---|---|---|---|---|---|---|---|---|---|---|---|
| Cutcliffe | 0 | 0 | 0 | 1 | 0 | 1 | 0 | 1 | X | X | 3 |
| Pinkney 🔨 | 1 | 1 | 1 | 0 | 2 | 0 | 3 | 0 | X | X | 8 |

| Sheet 2 | 1 | 2 | 3 | 4 | 5 | 6 | 7 | 8 | 9 | 10 | Final |
|---|---|---|---|---|---|---|---|---|---|---|---|
| Hilliard 🔨 | 0 | 0 | 1 | 0 | 1 | 0 | 2 | 0 | 1 | 0 | 5 |
| McConnery | 0 | 0 | 0 | 0 | 0 | 2 | 0 | 2 | 0 | 3 | 7 |

| Sheet 3 | 1 | 2 | 3 | 4 | 5 | 6 | 7 | 8 | 9 | 10 | Final |
|---|---|---|---|---|---|---|---|---|---|---|---|
| Mouzar 🔨 | 0 | 0 | 1 | 0 | 0 | 1 | 1 | 1 | 0 | 1 | 5 |
| Nix | 0 | 0 | 0 | 1 | 1 | 0 | 0 | 0 | 2 | 0 | 4 |

| Sheet 4 | 1 | 2 | 3 | 4 | 5 | 6 | 7 | 8 | 9 | 10 | Final |
|---|---|---|---|---|---|---|---|---|---|---|---|
| Arsenault 🔨 | 1 | 0 | 0 | 1 | 2 | 0 | 0 | 0 | 0 | X | 4 |
| Rhyno | 0 | 1 | 1 | 0 | 0 | 1 | 0 | 3 | 2 | X | 8 |

=== Draw 3 ===
January 7, 1:00 PM

| Sheet 1 | 1 | 2 | 3 | 4 | 5 | 6 | 7 | 8 | 9 | 10 | Final |
|---|---|---|---|---|---|---|---|---|---|---|---|
| Mouzar | 0 | 0 | 0 | 0 | 0 | 0 | X | X | X | X | 0 |
| Rhyno 🔨 | 0 | 1 | 1 | 1 | 4 | 2 | X | X | X | X | 9 |

| Sheet 2 | 1 | 2 | 3 | 4 | 5 | 6 | 7 | 8 | 9 | 10 | Final |
|---|---|---|---|---|---|---|---|---|---|---|---|
| Pinkney | 0 | 1 | 0 | 2 | 0 | 0 | 1 | 0 | 2 | 0 | 6 |
| Nix 🔨 | 3 | 0 | 2 | 0 | 1 | 0 | 0 | 1 | 0 | 2 | 9 |

| Sheet 3 | 1 | 2 | 3 | 4 | 5 | 6 | 7 | 8 | 9 | 10 | Final |
|---|---|---|---|---|---|---|---|---|---|---|---|
| Hilliard | 0 | 0 | 0 | 2 | 0 | 1 | 2 | 0 | 0 | 0 | 5 |
| Arsenault 🔨 | 2 | 1 | 1 | 0 | 0 | 0 | 0 | 1 | 1 | 2 | 8 |

| Sheet 4 | 1 | 2 | 3 | 4 | 5 | 6 | 7 | 8 | 9 | 10 | Final |
|---|---|---|---|---|---|---|---|---|---|---|---|
| Cutcliffe | 0 | 0 | 0 | 1 | 0 | 1 | 2 | 1 | 1 | 0 | 6 |
| McConnery 🔨 | 0 | 0 | 1 | 0 | 2 | 0 | 0 | 0 | 0 | 2 | 5 |

=== Draw 4 ===
January 7, 7:00 PM

| Sheet 1 | 1 | 2 | 3 | 4 | 5 | 6 | 7 | 8 | 9 | 10 | Final |
|---|---|---|---|---|---|---|---|---|---|---|---|
| Hilliard | 0 | 0 | 0 | 1 | 0 | 1 | 0 | X | X | X | 2 |
| Cutcliffe 🔨 | 1 | 2 | 1 | 0 | 4 | 0 | 1 | X | X | X | 9 |

| Sheet 2 | 1 | 2 | 3 | 4 | 5 | 6 | 7 | 8 | 9 | 10 | Final |
|---|---|---|---|---|---|---|---|---|---|---|---|
| Arsenault | 0 | 0 | 2 | 0 | 1 | 0 | 1 | 0 | 0 | X | 4 |
| Mouzar 🔨 | 0 | 3 | 0 | 0 | 0 | 1 | 0 | 3 | 1 | X | 8 |

| Sheet 3 | 1 | 2 | 3 | 4 | 5 | 6 | 7 | 8 | 9 | 10 | Final |
|---|---|---|---|---|---|---|---|---|---|---|---|
| McConnery 🔨 | 3 | 0 | 4 | 0 | 0 | 2 | 1 | X | X | X | 10 |
| Pinkney | 0 | 1 | 0 | 2 | 0 | 0 | 0 | X | X | X | 3 |

| Sheet 4 | 1 | 2 | 3 | 4 | 5 | 6 | 7 | 8 | 9 | 10 | Final |
|---|---|---|---|---|---|---|---|---|---|---|---|
| Rhyno | 0 | 0 | 0 | 0 | 0 | 4 | 0 | 0 | 2 | 0 | 6 |
| Nix 🔨 | 0 | 0 | 0 | 0 | 1 | 0 | 2 | 1 | 0 | 3 | 7 |

=== Draw 5 ===
January 8, 1:00 PM

| Sheet 1 | 1 | 2 | 3 | 4 | 5 | 6 | 7 | 8 | 9 | 10 | Final |
|---|---|---|---|---|---|---|---|---|---|---|---|
| Pinkney 🔨 | 1 | 0 | 1 | 0 | 0 | 0 | 0 | 2 | 1 | 0 | 5 |
| Arsenault | 0 | 2 | 0 | 2 | 1 | 1 | 1 | 0 | 0 | 1 | 8 |

| Sheet 2 | 1 | 2 | 3 | 4 | 5 | 6 | 7 | 8 | 9 | 10 | Final |
|---|---|---|---|---|---|---|---|---|---|---|---|
| Cutcliffe 🔨 | 0 | 1 | 1 | 2 | 0 | 2 | 0 | 0 | 1 | 0 | 7 |
| Rhyno | 0 | 0 | 0 | 0 | 3 | 0 | 3 | 1 | 0 | 4 | 11 |

| Sheet 3 | 1 | 2 | 3 | 4 | 5 | 6 | 7 | 8 | 9 | 10 | Final |
|---|---|---|---|---|---|---|---|---|---|---|---|
| Nix 🔨 | 2 | 2 | 0 | 2 | 1 | 2 | X | X | X | X | 9 |
| Hilliard | 0 | 0 | 2 | 0 | 0 | 0 | X | X | X | X | 2 |

| Sheet 4 | 1 | 2 | 3 | 4 | 5 | 6 | 7 | 8 | 9 | 10 | Final |
|---|---|---|---|---|---|---|---|---|---|---|---|
| McConnery | 0 | 0 | 1 | 1 | 0 | 2 | 0 | 1 | 0 | 2 | 7 |
| Mouzar 🔨 | 1 | 0 | 0 | 0 | 1 | 0 | 1 | 0 | 1 | 0 | 4 |

=== Draw 6 ===
January 8, 7:00 PM

| Sheet 1 | 1 | 2 | 3 | 4 | 5 | 6 | 7 | 8 | 9 | 10 | Final |
|---|---|---|---|---|---|---|---|---|---|---|---|
| Rhyno | 0 | 0 | 2 | 0 | 0 | 0 | 0 | 0 | 0 | 2 | 4 |
| Hilliard 🔨 | 1 | 0 | 0 | 0 | 0 | 0 | 0 | 1 | 1 | 0 | 3 |

| Sheet 2 | 1 | 2 | 3 | 4 | 5 | 6 | 7 | 8 | 9 | 10 | Final |
|---|---|---|---|---|---|---|---|---|---|---|---|
| McConnery | 0 | 1 | 1 | 0 | 0 | 1 | 0 | 1 | 0 | 0 | 4 |
| Arsenault 🔨 | 2 | 0 | 0 | 0 | 1 | 0 | 2 | 0 | 0 | 3 | 8 |

| Sheet 3 | 1 | 2 | 3 | 4 | 5 | 6 | 7 | 8 | 9 | 10 | Final |
|---|---|---|---|---|---|---|---|---|---|---|---|
| Pinkney | 0 | 1 | 0 | 0 | 0 | 0 | X | X | X | X | 1 |
| Mouzar 🔨 | 2 | 0 | 3 | 0 | 3 | 1 | X | X | X | X | 9 |

| Sheet 4 | 1 | 2 | 3 | 4 | 5 | 6 | 7 | 8 | 9 | 10 | Final |
|---|---|---|---|---|---|---|---|---|---|---|---|
| Nix | 0 | 1 | 0 | 0 | 2 | 0 | 3 | 0 | 0 | 0 | 6 |
| Cutcliffe 🔨 | 3 | 0 | 0 | 2 | 0 | 1 | 0 | 1 | 0 | 2 | 9 |

=== Draw 7 ===
January 9, 9:00 AM

| Sheet 1 | 1 | 2 | 3 | 4 | 5 | 6 | 7 | 8 | 9 | 10 | Final |
|---|---|---|---|---|---|---|---|---|---|---|---|
| Nix 🔨 | 1 | 0 | 0 | 2 | 0 | 1 | 1 | 0 | 0 | 0 | 5 |
| McConnery | 0 | 1 | 1 | 0 | 2 | 0 | 0 | 1 | 1 | 1 | 7 |

| Sheet 2 | 1 | 2 | 3 | 4 | 5 | 6 | 7 | 8 | 9 | 10 | Final |
|---|---|---|---|---|---|---|---|---|---|---|---|
| Rhyno | 0 | 0 | 1 | 0 | 1 | 1 | 0 | 0 | 2 | 0 | 5 |
| Pinkney 🔨 | 1 | 1 | 0 | 1 | 0 | 0 | 2 | 2 | 0 | 1 | 8 |

| Sheet 3 | 1 | 2 | 3 | 4 | 5 | 6 | 7 | 8 | 9 | 10 | Final |
|---|---|---|---|---|---|---|---|---|---|---|---|
| Arsenault | 0 | 1 | 0 | 2 | 0 | 0 | 2 | 0 | 0 | 1 | 6 |
| Cutcliffe 🔨 | 1 | 0 | 2 | 0 | 1 | 0 | 0 | 1 | 0 | 0 | 5 |

| Sheet 4 | 1 | 2 | 3 | 4 | 5 | 6 | 7 | 8 | 9 | 10 | Final |
|---|---|---|---|---|---|---|---|---|---|---|---|
| Mouzar | 0 | 1 | 1 | 0 | 1 | 0 | 2 | 1 | 0 | X | 6 |
| Hilliard | 2 | 0 | 0 | 4 | 0 | 1 | 0 | 0 | 1 | X | 8 |

=== Tiebreaker ===
January 9, 7:00 PM

| Sheet 1 | 1 | 2 | 3 | 4 | 5 | 6 | 7 | 8 | 9 | 10 | Final |
|---|---|---|---|---|---|---|---|---|---|---|---|
| Rhyno 🔨 | 1 | 0 | 0 | 1 | 0 | 1 | 2 | 5 | X | X | 10 |
| Mouzar | 0 | 1 | 0 | 0 | 1 | 0 | 0 | 0 | X | X | 2 |

== Playoffs ==
| Semifinal | | Final |
| | | Mary-Anne Arsenault | 4 |
| Nancy McConnery | 8 | Nancy McConnery | 5 |
| Sarah Rhyno | 4 |

=== Semifinal ===
January 10, 9:00 AM

| Team | 1 | 2 | 3 | 4 | 5 | 6 | 7 | 8 | 9 | 10 | Final |
|---|---|---|---|---|---|---|---|---|---|---|---|
| McConnery 🔨 | 1 | 0 | 3 | 0 | 0 | 0 | 0 | 3 | 1 | X | 8 |
| Rhyno | 0 | 1 | 0 | 1 | 0 | 0 | 2 | 0 | 0 | X | 4 |

=== Final ===
January 10, 2:00 PM

| Team | 1 | 2 | 3 | 4 | 5 | 6 | 7 | 8 | 9 | 10 | Final |
|---|---|---|---|---|---|---|---|---|---|---|---|
| Arsenault 🔨 | 2 | 1 | 0 | 0 | 0 | 0 | 0 | 1 | 0 | 0 | 4 |
| McConnery | 0 | 0 | 1 | 0 | 1 | 0 | 2 | 0 | 0 | 1 | 5 |

== Qualification ==
=== Round 1 ===
The first qualification round was held from December 4–6, 2009 at the Glooscap Curling Club, in Kentville. It was held in a triple knockout format, qualifying six teams to the provincial championship.

Final Standings

| Team | W | L |
|---|---|---|
| Tanya Hilliard | 3 | 0 |
| Jill Mouzar | 2 | 0 |
| Colleen Pinkney | 2 | 1 |
| Sarah Rhyno | 2 | 1 |
| Mary-Anne Arsenault | 4 | 2 |
| Margaret Cutcliffe | 4 | 2 |
| Gail Sinclair | 3 | 3 |
| Nancy McConnery | 2 | 3 |
| Denice Nicholson | 1 | 3 |
| Theresa Breen | 1 | 3 |
| Jocelyn Nix | 0 | 3 |
| Cindy Robar | 0 | 3 |

=== Round 2 ===
The second qualification round was held from December 18–20, 2009 at the Shelburne Curling Club, in Shelburne. It was held in a double knockout format, qualifying two teams to the provincial championship.

Final Standings

| Team | W | L |
|---|---|---|
| Nancy McConnery | 2 | 0 |
| Jocelyn Nix | 2 | 1 |
| Gail Sinclair | 2 | 2 |
| Theresa Breen | 1 | 2 |
| Cindy Robar | 1 | 2 |
| Denice Nicholson | 0 | 2 |
