= 2009 Nova Scotia Scotties Tournament of Hearts =

- Host city: Bridgewater, Nova Scotia
- Arena: Bridgewater Curling Club
- Dates: January 20–25, 2009
- Winner: Team McConnery
- Curling club: Dartmouth CC, Dartmouth
- Skip: Nancy McConnery
- Third: Jennifer Crouse
- Second: Sheena Gilman
- Lead: Jill Thomas
- Finalist: Mary-Anne Arsenault

The 2009 Nova Scotia Scotties Tournament of Hearts, Nova Scotia's women's provincial curling championship, was held January 20-25 at the Bridgewater Curling Club in Bridgewater. The winning Nancy McConnery rink represented Nova Scotia at the 2009 Scotties Tournament of Hearts in Victoria, British Columbia.

== Teams ==
Skip	Third	Second	Lead	Club(s)
Mary-Anne Arsenault	Kay Zinck	Laine Peters	Theresa Breen	Mayflower Curling Club, Halifax
Margaret Cutcliffe	Jane Arseneau	Judy Power	Jill Linquist	Mayflower Curling Club, Halifax
Mary Mattatall	Mary-Sue Radford	Meaghan Smart	Christina Black	Mayflower Curling Club, Halifax
Nancy McConnery	Jennifer Crouse	Sheena Gilman	Jill Thomas	Dartmouth Curling Club, Dartmouth
Jill Mouzar	Heather Smith-Dacey	Kristen MacDiarmid	Teri Lake	Mayflower Curling Club, Halifax
Jocelyn Nix	Lisa DePaoli	Andrea Saulnier	Heather Sinclair	Glooscap Curling Club, Kentville
Colleen Pinkney	Wendy Currie	Karen Hennigar	Susan Creelman	Truro Curling Club, Truro
Sarah Rhyno	Jenn Brine	Jessica Bradford	Sam Carey	Mayflower Curling Club, Halifax

== Standings ==
Team	W	L
Arsenault	6	1
McConnery	4	3
Mouzar	4	3
Nix	4	3
Pinkney	3	4
Rhyno	3	4
Cutcliffe	2	5
Mattatall	2	5

== Results ==
=== January 21 ===
- McConnery 11-7 Nix
- Mouzar 7-3 Cutcliffe
- Pinkney 10-6 Rhyno
- Arseneault 7-6 Mattatall
- Rhyno 11-2 Mouzar
- Arsenault 7-5 Nix
- Mattatall 7-3 McConnery
- Pinkney 9-3 Cutcliffe

=== January 22 ===
- Nix 6-5 Pinkney
- Rhyno 8-6 Arsenault
- McConnery 11-7 Cutcliffe
- Mouzar 5-2 Mattatall
- Cutcliffe 5-4 Mattatall
- McConnery 6-3 Mouzar
- Arsenault 8-4 Pinkney
- Nix 7-3 Rhyno

=== January 23 ===
- Arsenault 8-3 McConnery
- Cutcliffe 6-5 Rhyno
- Nix 10-6 Mattatall
- Mouzar 9-2 Pinkney
- Rhyno 8-7 Mattatall
- Pinkney 9-5 McConnery
- Arsneault 7-2 Mouzar
- Nix 6-5 Cutcliffe

=== January 24 ===
- Arsenault 9-3 Cutcliffe
- Mattatall 8-7 Pinkney
- Mouzar 13-9 Nix
- McConnery 6-5 Rhyno

Tie breaker

- Mouzar 7-6 Nix

== Playoffs ==
All games January 25

Semifinal			Final
			1	Mary-Anne Arsenault	4
2	Nancy McConnery	8	2	Nancy McConnery	7
3	Jill Mouzar	2

=== Semi-final ===
Sheet 2	1	2	3	4	5	6	7	8	9	10	Final
Nancy McConnery	0	0	2	1	1	0	3	0	1	X	8
Jill Mouzar	1	0	0	0	0	1	0	1	0	X	2

=== Final ===
Sheet 3	1	2	3	4	5	6	7	8	9	10	Final
Mary-Anne Arsenault	2	0	0	1	1	0	0	0	0	X	4
Nancy McConnery	0	1	1	0	0	2	1	0	2	X	7
