= 2013 Nova Scotia Scotties Tournament of Hearts =

- Host city: Halifax, Nova Scotia
- Arena: Halifax Curling Club
- Dates: January 23–27
- Winner: Mary-Anne Arsenault
- Curling club: Mayflower Curling Club, Halifax
- Skip: Mary-Anne Arsenault
- Third: Colleen Jones
- Second: Kim Kelly
- Lead: Jennifer Baxter
- Alternate: Nancy Delahunt
- Finalist: Jocelyn Nix

The 2013 Nova Scotia Scotties Tournament of Hearts, the women's provincial curling championship for Nova Scotia, was held from January 23 to 27 at the Halifax Curling Club in Halifax, Nova Scotia. The winning Mary-Anne Arsenault rink represented Nova Scotia at the 2013 Scotties Tournament of Hearts in Kingston, Ontario.

== Teams ==
Skip	Third	Second	Lead	Alternate	Locale
Mary-Anne Arsenault	Colleen Jones	Kim Kelly	Jennifer Baxter	Nancy Delahunt	Mayflower Curling Club, Halifax
Theresa Breen	Amanda Simpson	Jocelyn Adams	Kelly Anderson		Mayflower Curling Club, Halifax
Coralie Duchemin	Heidi Bishop	Patty Merrigan	Marcie Bungay	Joan Latimer	Sydney Curling Club, Sydney
Kelly MacIntosh	Jennifer Crouse	Sheena Gilman	Shelley Barker	Julie McEvoy	Dartmouth Curling Club, Dartmouth
Jocelyn Nix	Andrea Saulnier	Jill Alcoe-Holland	Julie Morley		Glooscap Curling Club, Kentville
Heather Smith-Dacey	Stephanie McVicar	Blisse Comstock	Teri Lake		Mayflower Curling Club, Halifax
Margaret Cutcliffe	Mary Sue Radford	Katarina Hakansson	Sally Saunders		Mayflower Curling Club, Halifax
Mary Mattatall	Angie Bryant	Lisa MacLeod	Hayley Clarke		Mayflower Curling Club, Halifax

== Round-robin standings ==
Final round-robin standings

Key
Teams to Playoffs

Skip (Club)	W	L	PF	PA
Mary-Anne Arsenault (Mayflower)	6	1	50	19
Jocelyn Nix (Glooscap)	6	1	47	44
Heather Smith-Dacey (Mayflower)	5	2	45	34
Coralie Duchemin (Sydney)	4	3	47	46
Theresa Breen (Mayflower)	3	4	45	52
Margaret Cutcliffe (Mayflower)	2	5	33	45
Kelly MacIntosh (Dartmouth)	2	5	32	45
Mary Mattatall (Mayflower)	0	7	34	57

== Round-robin results ==
All draw times are listed in Atlantic Standard Time (UTC-4).

=== Draw 1 ===
Wednesday, January 23, 1:00 pm

Team	1	2	3	4	5	6	7	8	9	10	Final
Jocelyn Nix 🔨	1	0	0	1	2	0	1	1	0	X	6
Coralie Duchemin	0	0	2	0	0	1	0	0	1	X	4

Team	1	2	3	4	5	6	7	8	9	10	Final
Mary Mattatall	0	1	0	1	0	0	2	0	0	X	4
Margaret Cutcliffe 🔨	1	0	3	0	1	1	0	1	1	X	8

Team	1	2	3	4	5	6	7	8	9	10	Final
Heather Smith-Dacey	0	0	1	0	1	0	0	0	2	1	5
Theresa Breen 🔨	0	0	0	1	0	0	1	1	0	0	3

Team	1	2	3	4	5	6	7	8	9	10	Final
Mary-Anne Arsenault 🔨	0	0	1	1	0	0	2	0	1	X	5
Kelly MacIntosh	0	0	0	0	0	0	0	2	0	X	2

=== Draw 2 ===
Wednesday, January 23, 7:00 pm

Team	1	2	3	4	5	6	7	8	9	10	11	Final
Mary Mattatall	0	3	0	0	0	2	0	2	1	0	0	8
Theresa Breen 🔨	1	0	0	2	1	0	2	0	0	2	1	9

Team	1	2	3	4	5	6	7	8	9	10	Final
Mary-Anne Arsenault 🔨	3	0	2	0	2	2	X	X	X	X	9
Coralie Duchemin	0	2	0	1	0	0	X	X	X	X	3

Team	1	2	3	4	5	6	7	8	9	10	Final
Kelly MacIntosh	0	0	0	0	2	1	0	1	X	X	4
Jocelyn Nix 🔨	2	1	2	3	0	0	1	0	X	X	9

Team	1	2	3	4	5	6	7	8	9	10	Final
Margaret Cutcliffe 🔨	1	0	0	0	1	0	2	0	0	X	4
Heather Smith-Dacey	0	0	1	1	0	1	0	3	3	X	9

=== Draw 3 ===
Thursday, January 24, 1:00 pm

Team	1	2	3	4	5	6	7	8	9	10	Final
Margaret Cutcliffe 🔨	0	0	0	0	0	0	X	X	X	X	0
Mary-Anne Arsenault	0	1	3	1	1	1	X	X	X	X	7

Team	1	2	3	4	5	6	7	8	9	10	Final
Kelly MacIntosh 🔨	0	0	1	0	1	0	0	0	0	X	2
Heather Smith-Dacey	2	0	0	1	0	0	2	0	2	X	7

Team	1	2	3	4	5	6	7	8	9	10	Final
Mary Mattatall	0	0	2	2	0	0	0	1	0	X	5
Coralie Duchemin 🔨	1	2	0	0	2	1	1	0	1	X	8

Team	1	2	3	4	5	6	7	8	9	10	Final
Jocelyn Nix 🔨	0	2	0	0	0	2	0	1	0	2	7
Theresa Breen	1	0	1	0	1	0	1	0	2	0	6

=== Draw 4 ===
Thursday, January 24, 7:00 pm

Team	1	2	3	4	5	6	7	8	9	10	Final
Coralie Duchemin	1	0	2	0	2	0	2	1	2	X	10
Heather Smith-Dacey 🔨	0	2	0	1	0	1	0	0	0	X	4

Team	1	2	3	4	5	6	7	8	9	10	Final
Theresa Breen	0	2	0	0	2	0	0	1	0	X	5
Mary-Anne Arsenault 🔨	1	0	2	1	0	1	2	0	1	X	8

Team	1	2	3	4	5	6	7	8	9	10	Final
Jocelyn Nix	1	0	2	0	0	2	0	1	0	1	7
Margaret Cutcliffe 🔨	0	1	0	1	1	0	1	0	2	0	6

Team	1	2	3	4	5	6	7	8	9	10	Final
Mary Mattatall	0	1	0	2	0	0	0	1	1	0	5
Kelly MacIntosh 🔨	0	0	3	0	1	0	1	0	0	2	7

=== Draw 5 ===
Friday, January 25, 1:00 pm

Team	1	2	3	4	5	6	7	8	9	10	Final
Kelly MacIntosh 🔨	0	1	1	0	1	0	0	1	1	X	5
Margaret Cutcliffe	0	0	0	1	0	0	0	0	0	X	1

Team	1	2	3	4	5	6	7	8	9	10	11	Final
Jocelyn Nix 🔨	0	1	1	0	0	0	2	2	0	0	2	8
Mary Mattatall	0	0	0	1	1	0	0	0	2	2	0	6

Team	1	2	3	4	5	6	7	8	9	10	Final
Heather Smith-Dacey	0	0	2	0	1	0	0	0	1	1	5
Mary-Anne Arsenault 🔨	1	1	0	0	0	0	0	1	0	0	3

Team	1	2	3	4	5	6	7	8	9	10	11	Final
Theresa Breen	1	1	0	1	0	2	0	0	1	0	1	7
Coralie Duchemin 🔨	0	0	1	0	2	0	0	2	0	1	0	6

=== Draw 6 ===
Friday, January 25, 7:00 pm

Team	1	2	3	4	5	6	7	8	9	10	Final
Mary-Anne Arsenault 🔨	2	1	0	2	4	X	X	X	X	X	9
Jocelyn Nix	0	0	1	0	0	X	X	X	X	X	1

Team	1	2	3	4	5	6	7	8	9	10	Final
Margaret Cutcliffe 🔨	0	2	0	2	0	0	5	0	3	X	12
Theresa Breen	1	0	1	0	2	0	0	2	0	X	6

Team	1	2	3	4	5	6	7	8	9	10	11	Final
Coralie Duchemin 🔨	0	3	0	2	0	0	2	0	0	0	2	9
Kelly MacIntosh	0	0	2	0	1	3	0	0	0	1	0	7

Team	1	2	3	4	5	6	7	8	9	10	Final
Heather Smith-Dacey 🔨	1	0	0	4	1	0	1	1	X	X	8
Mary Mattatall	0	0	1	0	0	2	0	0	X	X	3

=== Draw 7 ===
Saturday, January 26, 9:00 am

Team	1	2	3	4	5	6	7	8	9	10	Final
Theresa Breen	1	0	1	1	2	0	1	0	3	X	9
Kelly MacIntosh 🔨	0	2	0	0	0	2	0	1	0	X	5

Team	1	2	3	4	5	6	7	8	9	10	Final
Heather Smith-Dacey	0	1	1	0	1	0	3	0	1	X	7
Jocelyn Nix 🔨	2	0	0	2	0	2	0	3	0	X	9

Team	1	2	3	4	5	6	7	8	9	10	Final
Mary-Anne Arsenault 🔨	1	0	3	0	1	0	0	2	2	X	9
Mary Mattatall	0	1	0	1	0	1	0	0	0	X	3

Team	1	2	3	4	5	6	7	8	9	10	11	Final
Coralie Duchemin 🔨	1	0	2	0	2	0	0	1	0	0	1	7
Margaret Cutcliffe	0	1	0	1	0	1	1	0	1	1	0	6

== Playoffs ==
Semifinal			Final
			1	Mary-Anne Arsenault	6
2	Jocelyn Nix	6	2	Jocelyn Nix	4
3	Heather Smith-Dacey	3

=== Semifinal ===
Saturday, January 26, 7:00 pm

Sheet 2	1	2	3	4	5	6	7	8	9	10	Final
Jocelyn Nix 🔨	1	0	0	1	1	1	1	0	1	X	6
Heather Smith-Dacey	0	1	0	0	0	0	0	2	0	X	3

=== Final ===
Sunday, January 27, 2:00 pm

Team	1	2	3	4	5	6	7	8	9	10	Final
Mary-Anne Arsenault 🔨	0	0	1	1	0	1	0	1	2	X	6
Jocelyn Nix	1	1	0	0	1	0	1	0	0	X	4

== Qualification rounds ==
=== Round 1 ===
The first qualification round for the 2013 Nova Scotties Tournament of Hearts took place from December 13 to 16, 2012 at the Sydney Curling Club in Sydney. The format of play was an open-entry triple knockout qualifying six teams to the provincial playoffs.

==== Teams ====
The teams are listed as follows:

Skip	Third	Second	Lead	Alternate	Locale
Sara Jane Arason	Melanie Ellis	Alexis Sinclair	Stephanie Hayes	Audra Gallant	CFB Halifax Curling Club, Halifax
Mary-Anne Arsenault	Colleen Jones	Kim Kelly	Jen Baxter	Nancy Delahunt	Mayflower Curling Club, Halifax
Theresa Breen	Amanda Simpson	Jocelyn Adams	Kelly Anderson		Mayflower Curling Club, Halifax
Marie Christianson	Kristen MacDiarmid	Christina Black	Jane Snyder		CFB Halifax Curling Club, Halifax
Coralie Duchemin	Heidi Bishop	Patty Merrigan	Marcie Bungay	Joan Latimer	Sydney Curling Club, Sydney
Tanya Hilliard	Liz Woodworth	Jill Thomas	Julia Williams		CFB Halifax Curling Club, Halifax
Kelly MacIntosh	Jennifer Crouse	Sheena Gilman	Shelley Barker	Julie McEvoy	Dartmouth Curling Club, Dartmouth
Mary Mattatall	Angie Bryant	Lisa MacLeod	Hayley Clarke		Mayflower Curling Club, Halifax
Nancy McConnery	Gail Sinclair	Tara LeGay	Jennifer Creaser		Bridgewater Curling Club, Bridgewater
Jocelyn Nix	Andrea Saulnier	Jill Alcoe-Holland	Julie Morley		Glooscap Curling Club, Kentville
Sarah Rhyno	Jenn Brine	Christie Lang	Kaitlin Fralic		Mayflower Curling Club, Halifax
Courtney Smith	Heather Whiteway	Jennifer Audas	Tanya Phillips		CFB Halifax Curling Club, Halifax
Heather Smith-Dacey	Stephanie McVicar	Blisse Comstock	Teri Lake		Mayflower Curling Club, Halifax

==== Results ====
===== A Event =====
First Knockout		Semifinals		Qualifier 1
		Mary-Anne Arsenault	8
Tanya Hilliard	6	Coralie Duchemin	2
Coralie Duchemin	7			Mary-Anne Arsenault	8
Heather Smith-Dacey	9			Kelly MacIntosh	7
Courtney Smith	3	Heather Smith-Dacey	8
Kelly MacIntosh	8	Kelly MacIntosh	9
Nancy McConnery	5

First Knockout
Theresa Breen	6
Jocelyn Nix	7
Sarah Rhyno	9
Sara Jane Arason	6

Semifinals
Mary Mattatall	5
Jocelyn Nix	12
Marie Christianson	8
Sarah Rhyno	6

Qualifier 2
Jocelyn Nix	8
Marie Christianson	2

===== B Event =====
Second Knockout		Semifinals		Qualifier 3
				Marie Christianson	7
				Heather Smith-Dacey	8
		Heather Smith-Dacey	8
Coralie Duchemin	7	Mary Mattatall	6
Mary Mattatall	8

Second Knockout
Theresa Breen	9
Sara Jane Arason	7
Tanya Hilliard	9
Courtney Smith	2

Quarterfinals
Nancy McConnery	1
Theresa Breen	7
Sarah Rhyno	8
Tanya Hilliard	7

Semifinals
Theresa Breen	10
Sarah Rhyno	7

Qualifier 4
Kelly MacIntosh	6
Theresa Breen	7

===== C Event =====
Third Knockout
Sara Jane Arason	7
Courtney Smith	4

Quarterfinals
Coralie Duchemin	6
Sara Jane Arason	3

Semifinals
Sarah Rhyno	6
Coralie Duchemin	8

Qualifier 5
Marie Christianson	2
Coralie Duchemin	6

Third Knockout		Semifinals		Qualifier 6
				Kelly MacIntosh	6
				Mary Mattatall	5
		Mary Mattatall	7
Nancy McConnery	7	Nancy McConnery	5
Tanya Hilliard	4

=== Round 2 ===
The second qualification round for the 2013 Nova Scotties Tournament of Hearts took place from January 4 to 6 at the Strait Area Community Curling Club in Port Hawkesbury. The format of play was an open-entry double knockout qualifying two teams to the provincial playoffs.

==== Teams ====
Skip	Third	Second	Lead	Alternate	Locale
Sara Jane Aranson	Melanie Ellis	Alexis Sinclair	Stephanie Hayes	Audra Gallant	CFB Halifax Curling Club, Halifax
Marie Christianson	Kristen MacDiarmid	Christina Black	Jane Snyder	Colleen Pinkney	CFB Halifax Curling Club, Halifax
Margaret Cutcliffe	Mary Sue Radford	Katarina Hakansson	Sally Saunders		Mayflower Curling Club, Halifax
Lindsay Doucet	Sara Spafford	Tara LeGay	MacKenzie Proctor		
Tanya Hilliard	Liz Woodworth	Jill Thomas	Julia Williams		CFB Halifax Curling Club, Halifax
Mary Mattatall	Angie Bryant	Lisa MacLeod	Hayley Clarke		Mayflower Curling Club, Halifax
Sarah Rhyno	Jennifer Brine	Christie Lang	Kaitlin Fralic		Mayflower Curling Club, Halifax
Courtney Smith	Heather Whiteway	Jennifer Audas	Tanya Phillips	Karlee Jones	CFB Halifax Curling Club, Halifax

==== Results ====
===== A Event =====
First Knockout		Semifinals		Qualifier 1
Tanya Hillard	7
Sara Jane Arason	6	Tanya Hillard	6
Mary Mattatall	8	Mary Mattatall	7
Courtney Smith	6			Mary Mattatall	6
Sarah Rhyno	4			Margaret Cutcliffe	5
Lindsay Doucet	6	Lindsay Doucet	6
Marie Christianson	7	Margaret Cutcliffe	12
Margaret Cutcliffe	8

===== B Event =====
Second Knockout
Sara Jane Arason	8
Courtney Smith	7
Sarah Rhyno	8
Marie Christianson	5

Quarterfinals
Lindsay Doucet	11
Sara Jane Arason	6
Tanya Hillard	7
Sarah Rhyno	8

Semifinals
Lindsay Doucet	5
Sarah Rhyno	4

Qualifier 2
Margaret Cutcliffe	10
Lindsay Doucet	9
