= Colleen Jones =

Canadian curler and television personality (1959–2025)

Colleen Jones CM
- Curler
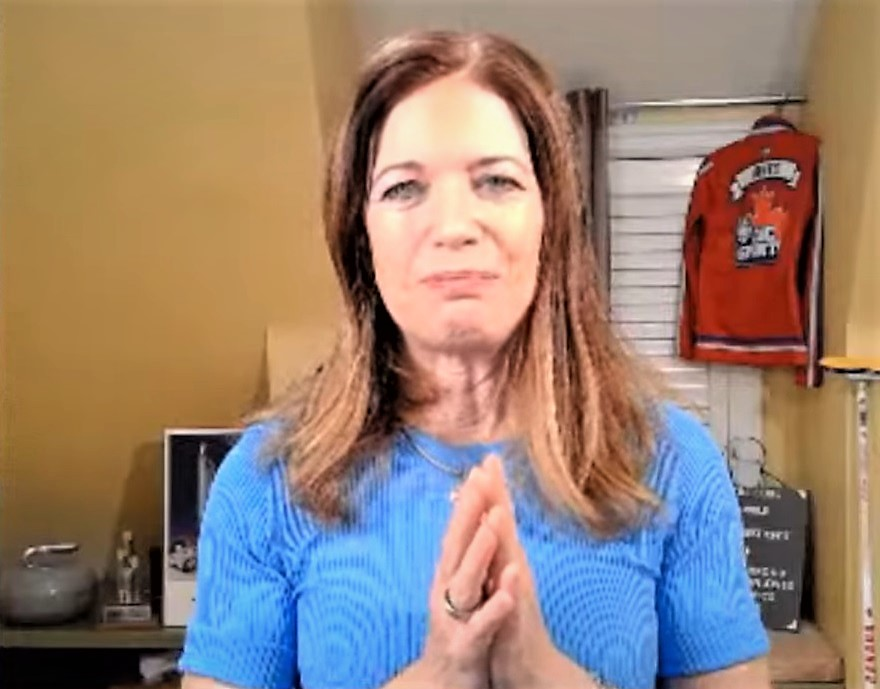
- Born: Colleen Patricia Jones; 16 December 1959; Halifax, Nova Scotia, Canada
- Died: 25 November 2025 (aged 65); Mader's Cove, Nova Scotia, Canada

Team
- Curling club: Mayflower Curling Club, Halifax, NS

Curling career
- Member Association: Nova Scotia
- Hearts: 21 (1979, 1980, 1982, 1984, 1986, 1989, 1991, 1992, 1993, 1994, 1996, 1997, 1999, 2000, 2001, 2002, 2003, 2004, 2005, 2006, 2013)
- World Championship: 6 (1982, 1999, 2001, 2002, 2003, 2004)
- Top CTRS ranking: 2nd (2003–04)
Medal record
Women's curling
Representing Canada
Scotties Tournament of Hearts
Gold medal – first place	2002 Brandon
Gold medal – first place	2003 Kitchener
Gold medal – first place	2004 Red Deer
World Championships
Gold medal – first place	2001 Lausanne
Gold medal – first place	2004 Gävle
Silver medal – second place	2003 Winnipeg
World Senior Championships
Gold medal – first place	2017 Lethbridge
Representing Nova Scotia
Scotties Tournament of Hearts
Gold medal – first place	1982 Regina
Gold medal – first place	1999 Charlottetown
Gold medal – first place	2001 Sudbury
Silver medal – second place	1980 Edmonton
Silver medal – second place	1984 Charlottetown
Bronze medal – third place	2006 London
Canadian Olympic Trials
Bronze medal – third place	2001 Regina
Canada Games
Silver medal – second place	1979 Brandon

Colleen Patricia Jones CM (16 December 1959 – 25 November 2025) was a Canadian curler and television personality. She is best known as the skip of two women's world championship teams and six Tournament of Hearts Canadian women's championships, including an unprecedented four titles in a row and held the record for most Tournament of Hearts wins from when she won her 67th game in 1994 until her eventual 152 wins were eclipsed by Jennifer Jones in 2021.

Jones also served as a reporter and weather presenter for the Canadian Broadcasting Corporation, and as a curling commentator for NBC in the United States, particularly during the 2010 Winter Olympics.

In 2018, Jones finished second to Sidney Crosby in a listing of the greatest 15 athletes in Nova Scotia's history. In 2019, she was named the third greatest Canadian woman curler in history in a TSN poll of broadcasters, reporters and top curlers. In 2016, Jones was awarded the Order of Sport, marking her induction into Canada's Sports Hall of Fame.

She had previously coached the Owen Purcell rink.

== Curling career ==
=== Early years ===
Born in Halifax, Nova Scotia, Canada, from a family of curlers, at age 14 she joined the Mayflower Curling Club. She found success in competitive curling from an early age, playing skip for the St. Patrick's High School curling team.

In juniors, Jones won two provincial women's championships; in 1976 playing second for Kathy Myketyn, and in 1977 skipping her own team of Colleen Chisholm, Sheila Jones and Shelley Blanchard. At the 1976 Canadian Junior Women's Curling Championship, the Myketyn-led team finished with a 3–6 record. In 1977, Jones and her team went on to represent Nova Scotia at that year's Canadian Junior Women's Curling Championship, where she led her rink to a 6–4 round robin record, good enough for fourth place. In 1979, Jones was the skip of the Nova Scotia women's team at the Canada Winter Games. There, she made it to the final, where she lost to New Brunswick's Denise Lavigne, settling for a silver medal.

She was only 19 years old when she won the first of her 16 Nova Scotia Women's Curling Championships, playing second on a rink skipped by Penny LaRocque. Two days after winning a silver medal at the 1979 Canada Games, Jones was off to the 1979 Macdonald Lassies, the national championship, as a member of LaRocque's rink. There, the team finished tied for second in the round robin, with a 7–3 record. The team then lost in their tiebreaker match, missing the playoffs.

=== Early success as skip (1980–1982) ===
In 1980, Jones was skipping her own team of Sally Jane Saunders, Margaret Knickle and sister Barbara Jones. She won her first provincial title as a skip, going undefeated at the Nova Scotia women's championship, defeating Gwen Osborne in the final. She then led her team at the 1980 Canadian Ladies Curling Association Championship, going 9–1 in round robin play, good enough for first place, earning her team a bye to the final. However, she faltered in the final, losing to Saskatchewan's Marj Mitchell, whose round robin record was only 6–4. Later that month, Jones played third on the Nova Scotia rink, skipped by future husband Scott Saunders at the 1980 Canadian Mixed Curling Championship. There, the Saunders-led rink finished with a 5–6 record, tied for fifth.

Jones was eliminated from zone playdowns in Nova Scotia in 1981, but returned in 1982 to win her second provincial title as a skip, with teammates Kay Smith and sisters Monica and Barb. At the 1982 Scott Tournament of Hearts, the re-branded national women's championship, she became the youngest skip, at age 22, ever to win the national women's title. There, she led her team to a 7–3 round robin record, in a five-way tie for first place. In the playoffs, she beat Saskatchewan's Arleen Day and then Manitoba's Dot Rose in the final. The team then went on to represent Canada at the 1982 World Women's Curling Championship in Switzerland. Jones led the team to a 6–3 round robin record, in a four-way tie for second place. This put them in a set of tiebreakers against Scotland's Isobel Torrance and Norway's Trine Trulsen. The team lost both games, eliminating them from playoff contention.

=== 1983–1989 ===
Over the next few years, Jones' career, marriage and a family slowed down her competitive curling, though she still made it to numerous national championships.

Jones was eliminated from the 1983 provincials by Virginia Jackson after losing her second game of the double-kockout event. Jones won the provincial mixed title that year however, playing third for Scott Saunders. They represented Nova Scotia at the 1983 Canadian Mixed Curling Championship, where the team finished with a 6–5 record.

Jones beat Virginia Jackson in the final of the 1984 Nova Scotia Hearts, sending her, third Wendy Currie and sisters Monica and Barb to the 1984 Scott Tournament of Hearts. At the Hearts, she led her team to another first place round robin finish, with a 9–1 record. However, she lost in the final to Manitoba's Connie Laliberte rink.

Jones was eliminated early on during the 1985 provincials. The following season, she joined forces with her former teammate, Penny LaRocque who had become her main rival in the province, with LaRocque throwing third. The team found success, winning the 1986 provincial championship, beating Mary Mattatall in the final. The team also included frontenders Cathy Caudle and Susan Robinson. They weren't very successful at the 1986 Scott Tournament of Hearts however, going 5–6 in the round robin, missing the playoffs.

The Jones–LaRocque partnership did not last long, and LaRocque went on to form her own team again. At the 1987 provincial championship, Jones was eliminated from play after losing to LaRocque and Virginia Jackson. Jones and teammates Kay Smith, Kim Dolan and Cathy Caudle played in the 1987 Canadian Olympic Curling Trials that season, with a chance to compete at the 1988 Winter Olympics, where curling was a demonstration sport. There, she led the team to a 4–3 round robin record, but lost to Pat Sanders in a tiebreaker. Jones won another provincial mixed title with husband Scott Saunders in 1988, but could not play in that year's Canadian Mixed Championship due to work commitments.

Jones won her sixth provincial title in 1989, with teammates Mary Mattatall, sister Monica (now Moriarty) and lead Kelly Anderson, defeating former teammate Cathy Caudle in the final. At the 1989 Scott Tournament of Hearts, she led her team to a 7–4 round robin record, in a five-way tie for second. She lost to Team Canada's Heather Houston in a tiebreaker though, eliminating her from playoff contention.

=== 1989–1998 ===
Jones took the 1989–90 season off from competitive curling to focus on CBC's coverage of the 1990 Commonwealth Games. The following season, she was back to her old form, winning a seventh provincial title, beating Heather Rankin in the 1991 Nova Scotia final. At the 1991 Scott Tournament of Hearts, Jones led her rink of Mary Mattatall, Kim Kelly and Nancy Reid to a 5–6 record.

With new lead Sue Green, Jones won her eighth provincial title, defeating Marg Cutcliffe in the final at the 1992 Nova Scotia provincial championship. Jones became the first skip to win back to back provincial titles since 1979. The team represented Nova Scotia on home ice in Halifax at the 1992 Scott Tournament of Hearts, where they finished with a 6–5 record, missing the playoffs.

Jones won her third straight provincial title in 1993, defeating Tracy Dobson 9–0 in just three ends in the Nova Scotia final. Jones and her new team of Heather Rankin, Kay Zinck (Smith) and Mary Anne Arsenault then went on to finish 6–5 again at the 1993 Scott Tournament of Hearts. After winning her fourth provincial mixed title playing third for husband Scott Saunders, Jones won the 1993 Canadian Mixed Curling Championship. The team went 8–3 in round robin play, earning a bye to the final with a first place finish. In the final, they beat Alberta (skipped by Terry Meek) to claim the national championship.

Rankin's membership on Jones' women's team was brief, and Jones with Zinck, Angie Romkey and Kim Kelly beat Rankin in the 1994 Nova Scotia final, Jones' 10th provincial title. At the 1994 Scott Tournament of Hearts, the team finished with a 4–7 record. Jones and husband Scott Saunders won another mixed provincial title in 1994. They represented Nova Scotia at the 1994 Canadian Mixed Curling Championship, where they finished 4–2 in pool play, in a five-way tie for first in their pool. They then lost to New Brunswick in a tiebreaker before losing to Ontario in the Wildcard quarterfinal.

Jones provincial winning streak finally came to an end in 1995, when she lost to Virginia Jackson at that year's Nova Scotia Tournament of Hearts.

After winning another provincial mixed championship with husband Scott Saunders, Jones began the 1996 calendar year at the 1996 Canadian Mixed Curling Championship, throwing third for the Saunders-skipped Nova Scotians. The team finished the round robin in a two-way tie for second at 8–3, but were upset in the page 3 vs. 4 playoff game to British Columbia. Later that month, she won her 11th provincial women's title with teammates Zinck, Kelly and Nancy Delahunt, beating Helen Radford in the 1996 Nova Scotia final. At the 1996 Scott Tournament of Hearts, Jones led her team to a 6–5 round robin record, in a five-way tie for fourth place. The team managed to win their first tiebreaker against British Columbia's Jodi Busche, but lost in their next game to Manitoba's Maureen Bonar, eliminating them from playoff contention.

Jones and Saunders won a second-straight provincial mixed title, earning them the right to represent Nova Scotia at the 1997 Canadian Mixed Curling Championship in January that year. There, the team finished 8–3 again, tied for second. They were again eliminated in the 3 vs. 4 game, this time against Northern Ontario. A few weeks later, Jones won her 12th provincial title at the 1997 Nova Scotia Hearts, beating Mary Mattatall in the final. Jones led her team of Helen Radford, Kim Kelly and Nancy Delahunt to a 4–7 record at the 1997 Scott Tournament of Hearts. Mattatall won her revenge at the 1998 Nova Scotia Hearts, beating Jones in that year's provincial final.

=== Two World Championships and Tournament of Hearts dominance (1999–2006) ===
In January 1999, Jones won her second Canadian Mixed Championship, throwing third rocks for Paul Flemming. At the 1999 Canadian Mixed Curling Championship, the team went 8–3 in the round robin before winning all three of their playoff matches, beating PEI in the final. Later that month, with her new team of Kim Kelly, Mary Anne Waye (later Arsenault) and Nancy Delahunt, Jones won her 13th provincial title, defeating Nancy McConnery in the Nova Scotia final. The team then went on to go 8–3 at the 1999 Scott Tournament of Hearts in the round robin. In the playoffs, the team beat Manitoba's Connie Laliberte in the 1 vs. 2 page playoff game, putting them into the final, where they beat the defending champion Cathy Borst rink, representing Team Canada. This was the second Canadian curling title for Jones. The team then went on to represent Canada at the 1999 World Women's Curling Championship in Saint John, New Brunswick. There, the team missed the playoffs, finishing with a 4–5 round robin record.

As defending champions, Team Jones represented Canada at the 2000 Scott Tournament of Hearts. However, they had a less than stellar tournament, finishing out of the playoffs with a 5–6 record. This forced the team to go through provincials again in 2001. At the 2001 Nova Scotia Hearts, the rink beat Jocelyn Palmer in the final, giving Jones her 14th provincial title. At the 2001 Scott Tournament of Hearts, Jones led the team to a 7–4 record, in a four-way tie for second place in the round robin. In the playoffs, they beat Team Canada's Kelley Law in the 1 vs. 2 game, and beat her again in the final, to win their second Tournament of Hearts–Jones' third. They went on to represent Canada at the 2001 World Women's Curling Championship in Lausanne, Switzerland. There, the team topped the round robin with a 7–2 record, tied with Sweden's Anette Norberg team. They then beat Denmark's Lene Bidstrup in the semifinal, before beating Sweden in the final, to claim Jones's first World Curling Championship. The Hearts win also qualified the Jones crew to compete at the 2001 Canadian Olympic Curling Trials. There, the team went 6–3 in round robin play, but lost to team Sherry Anderson in the semifinal.

Jones followed up successful 2000–01 campaign with another Canadian championship at the 2002 Scott Tournament of Hearts. As defending champions, they represented Team Canada once again. Jones led her team to an 8–3 round robin record, in a three-way tie for second. In the playoffs, she lost in the 1 vs. 2 game against Saskatchewan's Sherry Anderson. However, the team rebounded in the semifinal, defeating Ontario's Sherry Middaugh, before beating Saskatchewan in the final. The team then represented Canada at the 2002 World Women's Curling Championship in North Dakota, going 5–4 in the round robin. This put the team in a three-way tie for the last playoff spot. The team won their tiebreaker match against Switzerland's Manuela Kormann, putting them into the playoffs. There, they lost in the semifinal to Scotland's Jackie Lockhart, and then lost in the bronze medal game to Norway's Dordi Nordby.

Jones and her team represented Canada again at the 2003 Scott Tournament of Hearts as defending champions. There, she led her rink to an 8–3 round robin record, for sole possession of second place. In the playoffs, she downed Prince Edward Island's Suzanne Gaudet in the 1 vs. 2 game. In the final, she met Newfoundland and Labrador's Cathy Cunningham, whom she beat for her third straight Tournament of Hearts title. At the 2003 World Women's Curling Championship, she went undefeated in the round robin, winning all nine of their games. In the semifinal, she beat Norway's Dordi Nordby, but were upset by the United States, skipped by Debbie McCormick in the final, settling for silver.

Jones won her lone Canada Cup in January 2004, beating Sherry Anderson in the final. A month later, representing Team Canada again, Jones won a record-setting sixth time at the 2004 Scott Tournament of Hearts. The team went 9–2 through the round robin, topping the table. In the playoffs, they knocked off Ontario's Sherry Middaugh in the 1 vs. 2 game, and then beat Quebec's Marie-France Larouche in the final to claim the championship. This made Jones the first skip to win four straight Canadian titles. From there the team went on to represent Canada at the 2004 World Women's Curling Championship in Sweden. There, the team went 6–3 in the round robin, good enough for a tie for second. In the semifinals, they knocked off Luzia Ebnöther of Switzerland before beating Norway's Dordi Nordby in the final to win their second World Curling Championship.

Their return at the 2005 Scott Tournament of Hearts as Team Canada was not as stellar. The team finished the round-robin at 6–5 and lost in a tie-breaker to Sandy Comeau of New Brunswick. When this happened, the team got a standing ovation, which even halted play in the other game that was occurring two sheets over. Later that year, the team played in the 2005 Canadian Olympic Curling Trials, where they finished with a 3–6 record.

For the first time since 2001, the team had to play in the Nova Scotia Tournament of Hearts in order to qualify for the 2006 Scott Tournament of Hearts. In the provincial final, the rink beat Kay Zinck 9–8 to send Jones to her 20th national championship appearance. At the 2006 Hearts, the team was back in form, finishing the round robin tied in second place with an 8–3 record. The team then lost in the 1 vs. 2 game to British Columbia's Kelly Scott, and bowed out of the tournament in the semi-finals to defending champion Jennifer Jones, who was skipping Team Canada. At the end of the 2006 season, the team broke up. Jones joined the team of fellow Haligonian Kay Zinck, as her third. The rest of the team got a new skip in Laine Peters.

=== 2006–2008 ===
Playing third for Kay Zinck during the 2006–07 season, the team made it to the final of the 2007 Nova Scotia Hearts, where they lost to Jill Mouzar. With the loss, Jones would be absent from the national Tournament of Hearts for the first time since 1998.

Jones went back to skipping for the 2007–08 season, forming a team with Olympic bronze medallist Georgina Wheatcroft from British Columbia, along with Kate Hamer from Ontario and Darah Provencal, also from BC in an effort to qualify for the 2009 Canadian Olympic Curling Trials. As the team resided in different provinces, it was ineligible from playing for a provincial championship, and therefore the Tournament of Hearts, but was still eligible for the Trials. The team was formed after the 2007 Players' Championship, where Jones filled in for Kelley Law, whose team consisted of Wheatcroft, Provencal and Shannon Aleksic. That team made it to the semifinals, where they lost to Jennifer Jones. Jones' new transnational squad didn't find much success on tour however, failing to qualify for the playoffs in any of the four Grand Slam events they played in.

At the end of the 2007–08 season, Jones would retire from competitive curling.

=== 2010–2011 ===
Colleen Jones announced on March 24, 2010, on CBC News that she would be again returning to competitive curling. Having been present for the 2010 Vancouver Olympics, a spark ignited in her, and she once again wanted to make another run for the 2014 Olympics in Sochi.

For the 2010–11 season, Jones was recruited by Heather Smith-Dacey, Blisse Comstock and Teri Lake, to take over skipping duties, when former skip Jill Mouzar moved to Ontario. The team played in two Grand Slams that Fall, missing the playoffs in both. Just as Jones was due to begin her competitive curling comeback, days before beginning the playdowns for the 2011 Nova Scotia Scotties Tournament of Hearts, It was announced on December 10, 2010, that Jones was diagnosed with meningitis. Jones turned over skipping duties to Heather Smith-Dacey, and brought in Danielle Parsons to play at third. Smith-Dacey's team won the Nova Scotia title, and then went on to win the bronze medal at the 2011 Scotties. Jones was able to return to competition after recovering from her illness, and won the 2011 Nova Scotia Senior Women's Championship on February 27. Jones and her senior team of Nancy Delahunt, Marsha Sobey and Sally Saunders represented Nova Scotia at the 2011 Canadian Senior Curling Championships, where she led the team to a 6–5 record, missing the playoffs.

=== 2011–2023 ===
For the 2011–12 season, Jones recruited a new squad, originally consisting of Kristen MacDiarmid, Helen Radford and Mary Sue Radford, all of whom previous played with Theresa Breen. Later in the season, she modified her team adding former teammate Nancy Delahunt to third, and Marsha Sobey to second. Mary Sue Radford remained at lead. Delahunt and Sobey were members of Jones' Senior women's champion team. After failing to qualify for the provincial 2012 Nova Scotia Scotties Tournament of Hearts, Jones and her senior team of Delahunt, Sobey and Sally Saunders, participated in the 2012 Nova Scotia Women's Senior Championships. They made it to the final, where they defeated Colleen Pinkney, 6–4, to win back-to-back seniors championships, qualifying for the National senior finals. With Delahunt skipping, and Jones throwing last stones, the team represented Nova Scotia at the 2012 Canadian Senior Curling Championships, where they lost in the semi-final to Newfoundland and Labrador's Cathy Cunningham, after finishing the round robin with an 8–3 record. By virtue of her semifinal lost, the team won the bronze medal.

For the 2012–13 season, Jones reunited with Mary-Anne Arsenault and Kim Kelly, with the goal of reaching the 2014 Winter Olympics in Sochi, Russia. Jones threw second stones on the team, while acting as the rink's vice skip, or "mate" while Arsenault skipped. The Arsenault-skipped team won the 2013 Nova Scotia Scotties Tournament of Hearts, defeating Jocelyn Nix in the final, and qualified for the 2013 Scotties Tournament of Hearts in Kingston, Ontario. There, they finished the event with a 5–6 record. It would be Jones' last trip to the Tournament of Hearts.

Jones won another provincial senior women's title in 2015 with teammates Kim Kelly, Mary Sue Radford and Nancy Delahunt. The team represented Nova Scotia at the 2015 Canadian Senior Curling Championships. There, the team made it to the final, where they lost to British Columbia's Sandra Jenkins. The team won another provincial seniors title in 2016, sending the rink to the 2016 Canadian Senior Curling Championships. There, they topped the championship pool in a tie with Ontario's Jo-Ann Rizzo. The team then beat Alberta's Cathy King in the semifinal, then Saskatchewan's Sherry Anderson in the final to claim the Canadian Senior Championship title. This sent the team to represent Canada at the 2017 World Senior Curling Championships in Lethbridge, Alberta where her rink went through the event undefeated to win the world title, including defeating Scotland's Jackie Lockhart in the semifinal, and Switzerland's Cristina Lestander in the final.

Jones and her senior team entered the 2018 Nova Scotia Scotties Tournament of Hearts, finishing the event with a 3–4 record. They qualified again in 2019, this time with Kelly throwing fourth stones, Jones at third and new lead Julia Williams. This team went 4–3, and lost in a tiebreaker to Kristen MacDiarmid. In mixed curling, Jones won another Nova Scotia Mixed Championship in 2019, and played in the 2020 Canadian Mixed Curling Championship throwing third for Peter Burgess. There, the team failed to make it to the championship round, going 2–4 in pool play.

Kelly and Jones with a new front end of Sheena Moore and Julia Colter qualified for the 2020 Nova Scotia Scotties Tournament of Hearts, where they went 6–1 in the round robin. The team beat Jill Brothers in the semifinal before losing to Jones' former teammate Mary-Anne Arsenault in the final.

Jones was the alternate for the Jessica Daigle at the 2022 Nova Scotia Scotties Tournament of Hearts. The team went 3–3, and didn't qualify for the playoffs. She spared for Marie Christianson on the Suzanne Birt rink at the inaugural 2022 PointsBet Invitational. There, the team was eliminated in the first game against Tracy Fleury. Jones was again the alternate for Daigle at the 2023 Nova Scotia Scotties Tournament of Hearts, going 2–3. Jones was the lead for Nova Scotia at the 2023 Canadian Mixed Curling Championship, on a team skipped by Paul Flemming. After posting a 7–3 record, the team was eliminated in the semifinals to eventual champions Saskatchewan. It would be Jones' final national championship at any level.

=== Career highlights ===
Colleen Jones is a member of the Canadian Curling Hall of Fame and the Nova Scotia Sport Hall of Fame.

- World Curling Champion: 2001, 2004
- Canadian Curling Champion: 1982, 1999, 2001, 2002, 2003, 2004
- Canadian Mixed Curling Champion: 1993, 1999
- World Senior Curling Champion: 2017
- Canadian Senior Curling Champion: 2016

She was appointed Member of the Order of Canada (CM) in the 2023 Canadian honours, "for her accomplishments and contributions both on and off the ice, as a Canadian curling legend, reporter and broadcaster."

== Broadcasting career ==
Jones began her broadcasting career in radio sports at CHUM radio in 1982. She made the switch to television broadcasting in 1984 at CTV, and joined the CBC in 1986. Beginning in 1993, Jones was the weather presenter and sports reporter for CBC Morning News on CBC Newsworld (now CBC News Network). At the 2006 Torino Olympics, she did CBC segments about curling. Jones also provided curling commentary for American network NBC's coverage of the 2010 Winter Olympics in Vancouver. She served as the sideline reporter for the curling events at the 2014, 2018 and 2022 Winter Olympics.

She also co-hosted the online series That Curling Show with CBC journalist Devin Heroux.

On 6 April 2023, it was announced that she would be retiring from CBC after almost 40 years with the broadcaster. On 28 May 2026, she was posthumously inducted into the CBC News Hall of Fame.

== Personal life and death ==
Jones was married to Scott Saunders and had two sons. One of her sons, Luke Saunders is also a curler and Jones coached her son's team skipped by Owen Purcell before her death.

Jones died from cancer in Mader's Cove, Nova Scotia, on 25 November 2025, at the age of 65. In May 2026, the Nova Scotia Women's Curling Championship trophy was renamed the Colleen Jones Memorial trophy in her honour.

== Grand Slam record ==
Key
C	Champion
F	Lost in Final
SF	Lost in Semifinal
QF	Lost in Quarterfinals
R16	Lost in the round of 16
Q	Did not advance to playoffs
T2	Played in Tier 2 event
DNP	Did not participate in event
N/A	Not a Grand Slam event that season

Event	2006–07
Players'	SF

=== Former events ===
Event	2007–08	2008–09	2009–10	2010–11
Autumn Gold	Q	DNP	DNP	DNP
Manitoba Lotteries	Q	DNP	DNP	Q
Wayden Transportation	Q	DNP	N/A	N/A
Sobeys Slam	Q	DNP	N/A	Q
