= 2017 Nova Scotia Scotties Tournament of Hearts =

- Host city: Halifax, Nova Scotia
- Arena: Mayflower Curling Club
- Dates: January 24–29
- Winner: Mary Mattatall
- Curling club: Glooscap CC, Kentville & Mayflower CC, Halifax
- Skip: Mary Mattatall
- Third: Andrea Saulnier
- Second: Jill Alcoe-Holland
- Lead: Margaret Cutcliffe
- Finalist: Jill Brothers

The 2017 Nova Scotia Scotties Tournament of Hearts, the provincial women's curling championship of Nova Scotia, was held from January 24 to 29 at the Mayflower Curling Club in Halifax. The winning Mary Mattatall team represented Nova Scotia at the 2017 Scotties Tournament of Hearts in St. Catharines, Ontario.

The winning Mattatall rink were all senior-aged, with all members of the team being over 50 years old. Mattatall won her sixth provincial title of her career, and her first since 2005 when she played third for Kay Zinck. Third Andrea Saulnier and second Jill Alcoe-Holland had both won provincial seniors titles in 2010 and lead Marg Cutcliffe won the provincial masters championship in 2016 for curlers over 60.

The top seed in the event was the defending champion Jill Brothers team, which earned a direct spot in the tournament along with former World Champion Mary-Anne Arsenault.

== Teams ==
Teams were as follows:

Skip	Third	Second	Lead	Alternate	Club(s)
Mary-Anne Arsenault	Christina Black	Jennifer Crouse	Jennifer Baxter		Dartmouth Curling Club, Dartmouth
Theresa Breen	Tanya Hilliard	Jocelyn Adams	Amanda Simpson		Dartmouth Curling Club, Dartmouth
Jill Brothers	Erin Carmody	Blisse Joyce	Jenn Brine	Sarah Murphy	Mayflower Curling Club, Halifax
Christie Gamble	Brigitte MacPhail	Kaitlyn Veitch	Michelle Lang		Mayflower Curling Club, Halifax
Kristen MacDiarmid	Kelly Backman	Liz Woodworth	Julia Williams	Marie Christianson	Mayflower Curling Club, Halifax
Mary Mattatall	Andrea Saulnier	Jill Holland-Alco	Margaret Cutlliffe		Glooscap Curling Club, Kentville; Mayflower Curling Club, Halifax
Nancy McConnery	Jocelyn Nix	Mackenzie Proctor	Shelley Barker		Windsor Curling Club, Windsor
Julie McEvoy	Sheena Moore	Jill Thomas	Caeleigh MacLean		CFB Halifax Curling Club, Halifax

== Round robin standings ==
Key
Teams to Playoffs
Teams to Tiebreaker

Skip	W	L
Mattatall	6	1
Brothers	5	2
Breen	4	3
McEvoy	4	3
Arsenault	3	4
MacDarmid	3	4
Gamble	2	5
McConnery	1	6

== Scores ==
Draw 1

- Arsenault 9-8 McConnery
- Brothers 5-4 Gamble
- Mattatall 7-4 Breen
- McEvoy 10-5 MacDiarmid

Draw 2

- Breen 9-4 Gamble
- Arsenault 6-5 McEvoy
- MacDiarmid 8-6 McConnery
- Mattatall 7-6 Brothers

Draw 3

- Mattatall 7-5 MacDiarmid
- Breen 10-4 McConnery
- Brothers 6-4 McEvoy
- Gamble 7-4 Arsenault

Draw 4

- McEvoy 8-7 McConnery
- Mattatall 8-4 Gamble
- MacDiarmid 6-5 Arsenault
- Brothers 7-4 Breen

Draw 5

- Arsenault 7-5 Mattatall
- McConnery 8-6 Brothers
- McEvoy 5-4 Breen
- MacDiarmid 8-3 Gamble

Draw 6

- Brothers 6-4 MacDiarmid
- Mattatall 7-6 McEvoy
- Gamble 11-7 McConnery
- Breen 7-5 Arsenault

Draw 7

- McEvoy 9-4 Gamble
- Breen 7-6 MacDiarmid
- Brothers 6-5 Arsenault
- Mattatall 7-4 McConnery

Tiebreaker

- Breen 8-4 McEvoy

== Playoffs ==
Semifinal			Final
			1	Mary Mattatall	10
2	Jill Brothers	7	2	Jill Brothers	4
3	Theresa Breen	5

=== Semifinal ===
Saturday, January 28, 6:00pm

Sheet 2	1	2	3	4	5	6	7	8	9	10	Final
Theresa Breen	0	1	0	1	0	0	1	0	2	0	5
Jill Brothers	2	0	1	0	0	1	0	2	0	1	7

=== Final ===
Sunday, January 29, 2:00pm

Sheet 2	1	2	3	4	5	6	7	8	9	10	Final
Mary Mattatall	0	1	0	2	0	2	5	0	X	X	10
Jill Brothers	0	0	2	0	1	0	0	1	X	X	4

2017 Nova Scotia Scotties Tournament of Hearts

Mary Mattatall
6th Nova Scotia Provincial Championship title
