= 2011 Nova Scotia Scotties Tournament of Hearts =

- Host city: Kentville, Nova Scotia
- Arena: Glooscap Curling Club
- Dates: January 25–30, 2011
- Winner: Team Smith-Dacey
- Curling club: Mayflower CC, Halifax
- Skip: Heather Smith-Dacey
- Third: Danielle Parsons
- Second: Blisse Comstock
- Lead: Teri Lake
- Finalist: Theresa Breen

The 2011 Nova Scotia Scotties Tournament of Hearts was held January 25–30 at the Glooscap Curling Club in Kentville, Nova Scotia. The winning team of Heather Smith-Dacey represented Nova Scotia at the 2011 Scotties Tournament of Hearts in Charlottetown, Prince Edward Island. They finished round robin play with a record of 7–4, winning a tiebreaker against British Columbia. The team lost the 3-4 page playoff game against Ontario, but rebounded by winning the Bronze Medal Game against the same team from Ontario.

== Teams ==
Skip	Vice	Second	Lead	Club
Mary-Anne Arsenault	Stephanie McVicar	Jennifer Baxter	Kelly MacIntosh	Mayflower Curling Club
Theresa Breen	Kristen MacDiarmid	Helen Radford	Mary Sue Radford	Mayflower Curling Club
Jennifer Crouse	Sheena Gilman	Jocelyn Adams	Jill Thomas	Mayflower Curling Club
Tanya Hilliard	Liz Woodworth	Christina Black	Kaitlin Fralic	Mayflower Curling Club
Simone MacKenzie	Virginia Jackson	Ellen Milligan	Stephanie Hayes	Mayflower Curling Club
Sarah Rhyno	Angie Bryant	Lisa MacLeod	Hayley Clarke	Mayflower Curling Club
Coralie Richards	Heidi Bishop	Carrie Cress	Patti Merrigan	Sydney Curling Club
Heather Smith-Dacey	Danielle Parsons	Blisse Comstock	Teri Lake	Mayflower Curling Club

== Standings ==
Skip (Club)	W	L	PF	PA	Ends Won	Ends Lost	Blank Ends	Stolen Ends
Theresa Breen (Mayflower)	6	1	50	37	33	28	7	7
Mary-Anne Arsenault (Mayflower)	5	2	50	34	28	25	10	7
Heather Smith-Dacey (Mayflower)	5	2	46	32	27	27	10	4
Sarah Rhyno (Mayflower)	4	3	43	44	26	29	14	4
Jennifer Crouse (Mayflower)	3	4	37	50	24	31	11	3
Tanya Hilliard (Mayflower)	3	4	47	44	32	30	8	7
Coralie Richards (Sydney)	2	5	42	47	29	25	10	11
Simone MacKenzie (Mayflower)	1	6	31	51	26	27	11	2

== Results ==
=== Draw 1 ===
January 26 9:00 AM

Sheet 1	1	2	3	4	5	6	7	8	9	10	Final
Richard 🔨	0	0	0	0	1	1	0	2	2	0	6
Rhyno	0	0	3	3	0	0	1	0	0	1	8

Sheet 2	1	2	3	4	5	6	7	8	9	10	Final
Arsenault 🔨	1	0	1	0	1	0	0	0	0	X	3
Breen	0	1	0	2	0	0	0	3	1	X	7

Sheet 3	1	2	3	4	5	6	7	8	9	10	11	Final
Crouse	0	0	3	1	0	0	0	0	0	2	1	7
Hilliard 🔨	0	2	0	0	0	1	1	1	1	0	0	6

Team	1	2	3	4	5	6	7	8	9	10	Final
Smith-Dacey	0	0	3	0	1	0	3	1	0	X	8
MacKenzie 🔨	0	3	0	0	0	1	0	0	1	X	5

=== Draw 2 ===
January 26 3:00 PM

Sheet 1	1	2	3	4	5	6	7	8	9	10	Final
Arsenault	0	1	1	0	0	2	0	5	0	X	9
Hilliard 🔨	1	0	0	2	1	0	1	0	2	X	7

Sheet 2	1	2	3	4	5	6	7	8	9	10	Final
Rhyno	0	0	2	0	0	0	1	0	0	X	3
Smith-Dacey 🔨	0	3	0	1	0	0	0	1	2	X	7

Sheet 3	1	2	3	4	5	6	7	8	9	10	Final
MacKenzie 🔨	0	1	0	0	2	1	0	0	1	0	5
Richard	1	0	2	1	0	0	0	1	0	3	8

Sheet 4	1	2	3	4	5	6	7	8	9	10	Final
Crouse 🔨	3	0	0	1	0	0	0	1	0	X	5
Breen	0	0	1	0	2	1	3	0	2	X	9

=== Draw 3 ===
January 27 1:00 PM

Sheet 1	1	2	3	4	5	6	7	8	9	10	11	Final
Smith-Dacey 🔨	0	0	0	1	0	0	2	0	0	2	0	5
Breen	0	1	1	0	0	1	0	1	1	0	1	6

Sheet 2	1	2	3	4	5	6	7	8	9	10	Final
MacKenzie	0	0	0	0	0	1	2	0	1	0	4
Crouse 🔨	1	0	0	1	1	0	0	1	0	3	7

Sheet 3	1	2	3	4	5	6	7	8	9	10	Final
Rhyno	0	0	0	0	1	0	3	1	0	3	8
Arsenault 🔨	0	3	0	0	0	2	0	0	2	0	7

Sheet 4	1	2	3	4	5	6	7	8	9	10	11	Final
Richard	0	1	0	2	0	0	0	2	1	1	0	7
Hilliard 🔨	2	0	2	0	2	1	0	0	0	0	1	8

=== Draw 4 ===
January 27 7:00 PM

Sheet 1	1	2	3	4	5	6	7	8	9	10	11	Final
Rhyno	0	2	0	0	1	0	1	0	2	0	1	7
Crouse 🔨	3	0	1	0	0	0	0	0	0	2	0	6

Sheet 2	1	2	3	4	5	6	7	8	9	10	Final
Hilliard	1	0	0	1	0	1	0	1	0	X	4
Smith-Dacey 🔨	0	1	1	0	1	0	2	0	2	X	7

Sheet 3	1	2	3	4	5	6	7	8	9	10	Final
Breen	0	2	0	0	2	0	1	0	2	X	7
Richard 🔨	1	0	1	1	0	1	0	1	0	X	5

Sheet 4	1	2	3	4	5	6	7	8	9	10	Final
Arsenault 🔨	3	0	0	3	0	1	1	X	X	X	8
MacKenzie	0	1	0	0	1	0	0	X	X	X	2

=== Draw 5 ===
January 28 1:00 PM

Sheet 1	1	2	3	4	5	6	7	8	9	10	Final
MacKenzie 🔨	2	0	0	1	0	0	2	0	1	X	5
Breen	0	2	1	0	2	0	0	3	0	X	8

Sheet 2	1	2	3	4	5	6	7	8	9	10	Final
Richard 🔨	0	0	0	0	2	0	1	1	0	X	4
Arsenault	0	0	0	3	0	1	0	0	3	X	7

Sheet 3	1	2	3	4	5	6	7	8	9	10	Final
Crouse	0	0	0	0	1	0	1	0	2	X	4
Smith-Dacey 🔨	1	0	1	1	0	2	0	2	0	X	7

Sheet 4	1	2	3	4	5	6	7	8	9	10	Final
Hilliard 🔨	0	2	0	0	0	1	1	0	0	2	6
Rhyno	1	0	2	0	0	0	0	1	1	0	5

=== Draw 6 ===
January 28 7:00 PM

Sheet 1	1	2	3	4	5	6	7	8	9	10	Final
Smith-Dacey 🔨	2	0	3	0	0	0	4	X	X	X	9
Richard	0	2	0	0	1	1	0	X	X	X	4

Sheet 2	1	2	3	4	5	6	7	8	9	10	Final
Breen	0	1	0	0	1	0	2	0	2	0	6
Hilliard 🔨	1	0	0	3	0	2	0	1	0	1	8

Sheet 3	1	2	3	4	5	6	7	8	9	10	Final
Rhyno 🔨	1	0	1	0	0	0	3	0	2	X	7
MacKenzie	0	1	0	0	1	0	0	2	0	X	4

Sheet 4	1	2	3	4	5	6	7	8	9	10	Final
Arsenault	2	0	1	1	2	0	1	0	3	X	10
Crouse 🔨	0	1	0	0	0	1	0	2	0	X	4

=== Draw 7 ===
January 29 9:00 AM

Sheet 1	1	2	3	4	5	6	7	8	9	10	Final
Hilliard 🔨	1	0	0	1	0	1	2	0	0	0	5
MacKenzie	0	0	2	0	2	0	0	1	0	1	6

Sheet 2	1	2	3	4	5	6	7	8	9	10	Final
Richard	1	0	1	3	0	0	0	3	X	X	8
Crouse 🔨	0	1	0	0	2	0	0	0	X	X	3

Sheet 3	1	2	3	4	5	6	7	8	9	10	Final
Smith-Dacey	0	0	1	0	0	1	0	0	1	X	3
Arsenault 🔨	1	0	0	1	1	0	1	2	0	X	6

Sheet 4	1	2	3	4	5	6	7	8	9	10	11	Final
Breen	0	1	0	1	0	2	0	1	1	0	1	7
Rhyno 🔨	1	0	1	0	2	0	1	0	0	1	0	6

== Playoffs ==
Semifinal			Final
			1	Theresa Breen	3
2	Mary-Anne Arsenault	3	3	Heather Smith-Dacey	7
3	Heather Smith-Dacey	8

=== Semifinal ===
January 29, 7:00 PM

Sheet 2	1	2	3	4	5	6	7	8	9	10	Final
Arsenault 🔨	0	0	0	1	0	1	1	0	0	X	3
Smith-Dacey	2	2	1	0	2	0	0	1	0	X	8

=== Final ===
January 30, 3:00 PM

Sheet 3	1	2	3	4	5	6	7	8	9	10	Final
Breen 🔨	1	0	0	0	0	0	0	0	2	X	3
Smith-Dacey	0	0	0	3	1	2	1	0	0	X	7

== Qualification round 1 ==
The first qualification round for the 2011 Nova Scotties Tournament of Hearts took place December 10–12, 2010 at the 14 Wing Greenwood Curling Club in Greenwood, Nova Scotia. The format of play was an open-entry triple knockout qualifying six teams to the Provincial playoffs at the Glooscap Curling Club in Kentville, Nova Scotia, January 25–30, 2011.

== Teams ==
Skip	Vice	Second	Lead	Alternate	Club
Mary-Anne Arsenault	Stephanie McVicar	Jennifer Baxter	Kelly MacIntosh		Mayflower Curling Club
Theresa Breen	Kristen MacDiarmid	Helen Radford	Mary Sue Radford		Mayflower Curling Club
Marie Christianson	Christie Lang	Jane Snyder	Anna Sampson		CFB Halifax Curling Club
Jennifer Crouse	Sheena Gilman	Jocelyn Adams	Jill Thomas	Amanda Simpson	Mayflower Curling Club
Margaret Cutcliffe	Sara Jane Arason	Karen Jay	Jill Linquist		Mayflower Curling Club
Nancy Delahunt	Kim Kelly	Marsha Sobey	Sally Saunders	Pat MacCarron	Mayflower Curling Club
Tanya Hilliard	Liz Woodworth	Christina Black	Kaitlin Fralic		Mayflower Curling Club
Simone MacKenzie	Virginia Jackson	Ellen Milligan	Stephanie Hayes	Denise Pelrine	Mayflower Curling Club
Mary Mattatall	Angie Bryant	Lisa MacLeod	Hayley Clarke	Heather Hopkins	Mayflower Curling Club
Nancy McConnery	Lauren Strickland	Kelly Levy	Caeleigh MacLean		Dartmouth Curling Club
Jocelyn Nix	Andrea Saulnier	Jill Alcoe-Holland	Julie Morley	Laura Fultz	Glooscap Curling Club
Colleen Pinkney	Wendy Currie	Shelley MacNutt	Susan Creelman	Karen Hennigar	Truro Curling Club
Sarah Rhyno	Jenn Brine	Jessica Bradford	Samantha Carey	Shelley Barker	Lakeshore Curling Club
Coralie Richards	Heidi Bishop	Carrie Cress	Patti Merrigan		Sydney Curling Club
Gail Sinclair	Alexis Sinclair	Jackie Foster	Audra Gallant		Mayflower Curling Club
Heather Smith-Dacey	Danielle Parsons	Blisse Comstock	Teri Lake		Mayflower Curling Club

=== A Event ===
Round of 16

Quarterfinals
A1	Smith-Dacey	4
A1	Richards	6
A2	Hilliard	11
A2	Cutcliffe	10
A3	Rhyno	6
A3	Delahunt	5
A4	Christianson	9
A4	McConnery	10

Semifinals
A1	Richards	8
A2	Hilliard	6
A3	Rhyno	9
A4	McConnery	6

A Qualifier
A5	Richards	8
A6	Rhyno	5

=== B Event ===
Round of 16

Quarterfinals
B1	Crouse	6
B1	MacKenzie	7
B2	Sinclair	4
B2	Breen	9
B3	Arsenault	8
B3	Mattatall	6
B4	Pinkney	6
B4	Nix	4

Semifinals
B1	MacKenzie	9
B2	Breen	8
B3	Arsenault	10
B4	Pinkney	3

B Qualifier
B5	MacKenzie	1
B6	Arsenault	10

=== C Event ===
C Qualifier
A7	Rhyno	6
B7	MacKenzie	10

=== D Event ===
Round of 16
Smith-Dacey	10
Cutcliffe	4
Mattatall	9
Nix	8
B1	Crouse	4
B2	Sinclair	8
A3	Delahunt	4
A4	Christianson	9

Quarterfinals
B5	Breen	7
D1	Smith-Dacey	9
A6	McConnery	8
D3	Mattatall	3
A5	Hilliard	6
D2	Sinclair	2
B6	Pinkney	9
D4	Christianson	4

Semifinals
D5	Smith-Dacey	10
D6	McConnery	6
D7	Hilliard	7
D8	Pinkney	6

D Qualifier
D9	Smith-Dacey	7
D10	Hilliard	6

=== E Event ===
Quarterfinals			Semifinals			E Qualifier
			D9	McConnery	9
			D10	Pinkney	10
						E2	Pinkney	3
D6	Mattatall	8				E3	Mattatall	6
D8	Christianson	7	C1	Rhyno	7
			E1	Mattatall	8

=== F Event ===
Round of 16
Cutcliffe	4
Crouse	9
Nix	3
Delahunt	8

Quarterfinals
D7	Sinclair	9
F1	Crouse	7
D5	Breen	X
F2	Delahunt	X

Semifinals
F3	Sinclair	2
F4	Breen	11

F Qualifier
D11	Hilliard	10
F5	Breen	6

== Qualification round 2 ==
The second qualification round for the 2011 Nova Scotties Tournament of Hearts took place January 7–9, 2010 at the Halifax Curling Club in Halifax, Nova Scotia. The format of play was an open-entry double knockout qualifying two teams to the Provincial playoffs at the Glooscap Curling Club in Kentville, Nova Scotia, January 25–30, 2011.

== Teams ==
Skip	Vice	Second	Lead	Alternate	Club
Theresa Breen	Kristen MacDiarmid	Helen Radford	Mary Sue Radford		Mayflower Curling Club
Marie Christianson	Christie Lang	Jane Snyder	Anna Sampson		CFB Halifax Curling Club
Jennifer Crouse	Sheena Gilman	Jocelyn Adams	Jill Thomas	Amanda Simpson	Mayflower Curling Club
Margaret Cutcliffe	Sara Jane Arason	Karen Jay	Jill Linquist		Mayflower Curling Club
Nancy McConnery	Lauren Strickland	Kelly Levy	Caeleigh MacLean		Dartmouth Curling Club
Jocelyn Nix	Andrea Saulnier	Jill Alcoe Holland	Julie Morley	Laura Fultz	Glooscap Curling Club
Colleen Pinkney	Wendy Currie	Shelley MacNutt	Susan Creelman	Karen Hennigar	Truro Curling Club
Sarah Rhyno	Jennifer Brine	Jessica Bradford	Samantha Carey	Shelley Barker	Lakeshore Curling Club
Gail Sinclair	Alexis Sinclair	Jackie Foster	Audra Gallant		Mayflower Curling Club

== A Event ==
A Side
A1	Nix	10
A1	McConnery	5

Quarterfinals
A2	Rhyno	6
A2	Breen	9
A3	Christianson	10
A3	Cutcliffe	4
A5	Crouse	8
A1	Nix	5
A4	Pinkney	4
A4	Sinclair	6

Semifinals
A2	Breen	12
A3	Christianson	5
A5	Crouse	12
A4	Sinclair	5

Finals
A6	Breen	5
A7	Crouse	8

== B Event ==
B Side
McConnery	4
Rhyno	6

Quarterfinals
A3	Cutcliffe	4
B1	Rhyno	6
A4	Pinkney	5
A5	Nix	11

Semifinals
A7	Sinclair	5
B2	Rhyno	6
A6	Christianson	4
B3	Nix	7

Finals
B4	Rhyno	7
B5	Nix	9

Final
A8	Breen	7
B6	Nix	4
