= 2018 Nova Scotia Scotties Tournament of Hearts =

- Host city: Dartmouth, Nova Scotia
- Arena: Dartmouth Curling Club
- Dates: January 9-14
- Winner: Team Arsenault
- Curling club: Dartmouth Curling Club
- Skip: Mary-Anne Arsenault
- Third: Christina Black
- Second: Jennifer Baxter
- Lead: Jennifer Crouse
- Coach: Peter Corkum
- Finalist: Kristen MacDiarmid

The 2018 Nova Scotia Scotties Tournament of Hearts, the provincial women's curling championship of Nova Scotia, was held from January 9 to 14 at the Dartmouth Curling Club in Dartmouth. The winning Mary-Anne Arsenault team represented Nova Scotia at the 2018 Scotties Tournament of Hearts in Penticton, British Columbia. At the National tournament, they finished tied for 2nd in Pool A, 3rd in the Championship pool, but lost the semi-final match.

== Teams ==
Teams were as follows:

| Skip | Third | Second | Lead | Alternate | Club(s) |
|---|---|---|---|---|---|
| Mary-Anne Arsenault | Christina Black | Jennifer Baxter | Jennifer Crouse | | Dartmouth Curling Club, Dartmouth |
| Theresa Breen | Marlee Powers | Jocelyn Adams | Amanda Simpson | | Mayflower Curling Club, Halifax |
| Jill Brothers | Erin Carmody | Sarah Murphy | Jenn Brine | Blisse Joyce | Mayflower Curling Club, Halifax |
| Colleen Jones | Kim Kelly | Mary Sue Radford | Nancy Delahunt | | Mayflower Curling Club, Halifax |
| Isabelle Ladouceur | Emilie Proulx | Makayla Harnish | Elsa Nauss | Kate Callaghan | Lakeshore Curling Club, Lower Sackville |
| Kristen MacDiarmid | Marie Christianson | Liz Woodworth | Julia Williams | Kelly Backman | Halifax Curling Club, Halifax |
| Julie McEvoy | Danielle Parsons | Sheena Moore | Jill Thomas | | CFB Halifax Curling Club, Halifax |
| Colleen Pinkney | Brigitte MacPhail | Kaitlyn Veitch | Mary Myketyn-Driscoll | Michelle MacDonald | Truro Curling Club, Truro |

== Round-robin standings ==
Final round-robin standings

Key
| Teams to Playoffs |
| Teams to Tiebreaker |

| Skip | W | L |
|---|---|---|
| Mary-Anne Arsenault | 6 | 1 |
| Kristen MacDiarmid | 5 | 2 |
| Jill Brothers | 4 | 3 |
| Theresa Breen | 4 | 3 |
| Colleen Jones | 3 | 4 |
| Julie McEvoy | 3 | 4 |
| Colleen Pinkney | 3 | 4 |
| Isabelle Ladouceur | 0 | 7 |

== Scores ==
=== January 9 ===
Draw 1

- MacDiarmid 5-4 Arsenault
- Ladouceur 3-8 Brothers
- Pinkney 10-5 Breen
- McEvoy 4-7 Jones

Draw 2

- Breen 5-2 Ladouceur
- MacDiarmid 7-5 Jones
- McEvoy 4-7 Arsenault
- Brothers 7-4 Pinkney

=== January 10 ===
Draw 3

- McEvoy 8-3 Pinkney
- Breen 4-8 Arsenault
- Brothers 4-7 Jones
- MacDiarmid 8-6 Ladouceur

Draw 4

- Arsenault 8-4 Jones
- Pinkney 7-5 Ladouceur
- MacDiarmid 9-4 McEvoy
- Brothers 9-5 Breen

=== January 11 ===
Draw 5

- MacDiarmid 5-3 Pinkney
- Brothers 3-5 Arsenault
- Breen 9-8 Jones
- McEvoy 8-4 Ladouceur

=== January 12 ===
Draw 6

- McEvoy 6-5 Brothers
- Pinkney 9-5 Jones
- Arsenault 8-1 Ladouceur
- Breen 8-6 MacDiarmid

Draw 7

- Jones 7-4 Ladouceur
- Breen 6-4 McEvoy
- Brothers 7-5 MacDiarmid
- Arsenault 8-6 Pinkney

=== Tiebreaker ===
Saturday, January 13, 8:00

| Sheet B | 1 | 2 | 3 | 4 | 5 | 6 | 7 | 8 | 9 | 10 | 11 | Final |
|---|---|---|---|---|---|---|---|---|---|---|---|---|
| Theresa Breen | 0 | 0 | 0 | 0 | 0 | 0 | 1 | 1 | 1 | 2 | 0 | 5 |
| Jill Brothers 🔨 | 2 | 1 | 0 | 1 | 1 | 0 | 0 | 0 | 0 | 0 | 3 | 8 |

== Playoffs ==
| Semifinal | | | Final |
| | | | 1 | Mary-Anne Arsenault | 8 |
| 2 | Kristen MacDiarmid | 7 | 2 | Kristen MacDiarmid | 5 |
| 3 | Jill Brothers | 4 |

=== Semifinal ===
Saturday, January 13, 18:00

| Team | 1 | 2 | 3 | 4 | 5 | 6 | 7 | 8 | 9 | 10 | Final |
|---|---|---|---|---|---|---|---|---|---|---|---|
| Kristen MacDiarmid 🔨 | 0 | 0 | 1 | 0 | 2 | 0 | 2 | 0 | 2 | X | 7 |
| Jill Brothers | 0 | 1 | 0 | 1 | 0 | 1 | 0 | 1 | 0 | X | 4 |

=== Final ===
Sunday, January 14, 13:00

| Team | 1 | 2 | 3 | 4 | 5 | 6 | 7 | 8 | 9 | 10 | Final |
|---|---|---|---|---|---|---|---|---|---|---|---|
| Mary-Anne Arsenault 🔨 | 0 | 2 | 0 | 2 | 0 | 1 | 0 | 3 | 0 | X | 8 |
| Kristen MacDiarmid | 0 | 0 | 1 | 0 | 1 | 0 | 1 | 0 | 2 | X | 5 |

2018 Nova Scotia Scotties Tournament of Hearts

Mary-Anne Arsenault
8th Nova Scotia Provincial Championship title
