= 2023 Nova Scotia Scotties Tournament of Hearts =

- Host city: New Glasgow, Nova Scotia
- Arena: Bluenose Curling Club
- Dates: January 26–29
- Winner: Team Black
- Curling club: Dartmouth CC, Dartmouth
- Skip: Christina Black
- Third: Jennifer Baxter
- Second: Karlee Everist
- Lead: Shelley Barker
- Coach: Carole MacLean
- Finalist: Tanya Hilliard

The 2023 Nova Scotia Scotties Tournament of Hearts, the provincial women's curling championship for Nova Scotia, was held from January 26 to 29 at the Bluenose Curling Club in New Glasgow, Nova Scotia. The event was held in conjunction with the 2023 Nova Scotia Tankard, the men's provincial championship. The winning Christina Black rink represented Nova Scotia at the 2023 Scotties Tournament of Hearts, Canada's national women's curling championship in Kamloops, British Columbia where they finished fourth overall losing to eventual champion Team Canada 9–4 in the 3 vs. 4 page playoff.

Just like the previous year, there was no preliminary round to qualify for the provincial championship. Any team was able to register to compete in the championship.

== Teams ==
The teams are listed as follows:

Skip	Third	Second	Lead	Alternate	Club
Christina Black	Jenn Baxter	Karlee Everist	Shelley Barker		Dartmouth CC, Dartmouth
Jennifer Crouse	Julie McEvoy	Sheena Moore	Kaitlin Fralic		Halifax CC, Halifax
Jessica Daigle	Kirsten Lind	Lindsey Burgess	Emma Logan	Colleen Jones	Halifax CC, Halifax
Tanya Hilliard	Taylor Clarke	Mackenzie Feindel	Heather MacPhee	Liz Garnett	Dartmouth CC, Dartmouth
Kristen MacDiarmid	Kelly Backman	Liz Woodworth	Julia Colter		Halifax CC, Halifax
Sarah Murphy	Erin Carmody	Kate Callaghan	Jenn Mitchell	Taylour Stevens	Mayflower CC, Halifax
Andrea Saulnier (Fourth)	Jill Alcoe-Holland	Jocelyn Nix (Skip)	Kimberly Garby		Glooscap CC, Kentville; Windsor CC, Windsor
Marlee Powers	Mary Myketyn-Driscoll	Jocelyn Adams	Amanda England		Halifax CC, Halifax

== Knockout brackets ==
=== A event ===
First Knockout	Qualifier 1
Christina Black	9
Jocelyn Nix	0
Christina Black	8
Jessica Daigle	5
Jessica Daigle	8
Sarah Murphy	4
Christina Black	10
Tanya Hilliard	6
Marlee Powers	9
Kristen MacDiarmid	5
Marlee Powers	4
Tanya Hilliard	5
Tanya Hilliard	10
Jennifer Crouse	9

=== B event ===
Second Knockout	Qualifier 2
1	Christina Black	7
4	Marlee Powers	11	Marlee Powers	6
5	Jocelyn Nix	5	Sarah Murphy	10	Christina Black	7
8	Sarah Murphy	9	Kristen MacDiarmid	5
2	Tanya Hilliard	5
3	Jessica Daigle	5	Kristen MacDiarmid	10
6	Kristen MacDiarmid	8	Kristen MacDiarmid	8
7	Jennifer Crouse	5

=== C event ===
Third Knockout	Qualifier 3
1	Kristen MacDiarmid	7
4	Marlee Powers	11	Marlee Powers	8
5	Jocelyn Nix	2	Jessica Daigle	6	Marlee Powers	2
8	Jessica Daigle	6	Tanya Hilliard	7
2	Christina Black	5
3	Tanya Hilliard	8	Tanya Hilliard	6
6	Jennifer Crouse	4	Sarah Murphy	5
7	Sarah Murphy	5

== Knockout results ==
All draw times listed in Atlantic Time (UTC−04:00).

=== Draw 1 ===
Thursday, January 26, 4:00 pm

Sheet 1	1	2	3	4	5	6	7	8	9	10	11	Final
Tanya Hilliard	0	2	0	1	0	2	0	1	0	3	1	10
Jennifer Crouse	1	0	2	0	3	0	1	0	2	0	0	9

Sheet 2	1	2	3	4	5	6	7	8	9	10	Final
Christina Black	1	2	0	5	1	X	X	X	X	X	9
Jocelyn Nix	0	0	0	0	0	X	X	X	X	X	0

Sheet 3	1	2	3	4	5	6	7	8	9	10	Final
Marlee Powers	0	1	0	4	1	0	1	0	2	X	9
Kristen MacDiarmid	2	0	1	0	0	1	0	1	0	X	5

Sheet 4	1	2	3	4	5	6	7	8	9	10	Final
Jessica Daigle	0	0	1	1	0	0	1	0	3	2	8
Sarah Murphy	0	1	0	0	0	1	0	2	0	0	4

=== Draw 2 ===
Friday, January 27, 8:00 am

Sheet 1	1	2	3	4	5	6	7	8	9	10	Final
Christina Black	3	0	1	1	0	0	1	1	1	X	8
Jessica Daigle	0	2	0	0	2	1	0	0	0	X	5

Sheet 2	1	2	3	4	5	6	7	8	9	10	Final
Kristen MacDiarmid	2	0	2	0	2	1	1	0	0	X	8
Jennifer Crouse	0	1	0	2	0	0	0	1	1	X	5

Sheet 3	1	2	3	4	5	6	7	8	9	10	Final
Jocelyn Nix	2	1	0	0	1	0	0	0	1	X	5
Sarah Murphy	0	0	0	2	0	4	1	2	0	X	9

Sheet 4	1	2	3	4	5	6	7	8	9	10	Final
Marlee Powers	0	0	1	1	0	0	1	0	1	0	4
Tanya Hilliard	0	0	0	0	3	0	0	2	0	0	5

=== Draw 3 ===
Friday, January 27, 4:00 pm

Sheet 1	1	2	3	4	5	6	7	8	9	10	11	Final
Marlee Powers	2	0	0	0	0	2	0	4	2	0	1	11
Sarah Murphy	0	0	2	2	1	0	1	0	0	4	0	10

Sheet 3	1	2	3	4	5	6	7	8	9	10	Final
Christina Black	2	0	3	0	2	0	0	2	0	1	10
Tanya Hilliard	0	1	0	1	0	2	1	0	1	0	6

Sheet 4	1	2	3	4	5	6	7	8	9	10	Final
Jessica Daigle	1	0	1	0	1	0	0	2	0	X	5
Kristen MacDiarmid	0	1	0	2	0	1	1	0	3	X	8

=== Draw 4 ===
Saturday, January 28, 8:00 am

Sheet 1	1	2	3	4	5	6	7	8	9	10	Final
Tanya Hilliard	0	1	0	3	0	1	0	0	X	X	5
Kristen MacDiarmid	0	0	4	0	2	0	2	2	X	X	10

Sheet 2	1	2	3	4	5	6	7	8	9	10	Final
Jocelyn Nix	0	0	0	0	0	1	0	1	0	X	2
Jessica Daigle	1	0	0	1	2	0	1	0	1	X	6

Sheet 3	1	2	3	4	5	6	7	8	9	10	Final
Jennifer Crouse	0	0	0	0	1	0	2	1	0	0	4
Sarah Murphy	0	0	1	2	0	0	0	0	1	1	5

Sheet 4	1	2	3	4	5	6	7	8	9	10	Final
Christina Black	1	0	2	0	1	0	2	1	0	0	7
Marlee Powers	0	1	0	1	0	1	0	0	1	2	6

=== Draw 5 ===
Saturday, January 28, 4:00 pm

Sheet 1	1	2	3	4	5	6	7	8	9	10	Final
Christina Black	0	1	0	0	1	2	0	3	0	X	7
Kristen MacDiarmid	0	0	1	1	0	0	2	0	1	X	5

Sheet 3	1	2	3	4	5	6	7	8	9	10	Final
Marlee Powers	0	0	0	1	0	3	2	0	5	X	11
Jessica Daigle	1	1	2	0	0	0	0	2	0	X	6

Sheet 4	1	2	3	4	5	6	7	8	9	10	Final
Tanya Hilliard	2	0	2	0	0	2	0	1	1	X	8
Sarah Murphy	0	1	0	1	1	0	2	0	0	X	5

=== Draw 7 ===
Sunday, January 29, 9:00 am

Sheet 3	1	2	3	4	5	6	7	8	9	10	Final
Christina Black	0	1	0	1	1	0	0	1	1	0	5
Tanya Hilliard	0	0	1	0	0	0	2	0	0	3	6

Sheet 4	1	2	3	4	5	6	7	8	9	10	Final
Kristen MacDiarmid	0	0	0	2	1	1	1	0	2	0	7
Marlee Powers	1	3	2	0	0	0	0	1	0	1	8

=== Draw 8 ===
Sunday, January 29, 2:00 pm

Sheet 2	1	2	3	4	5	6	7	8	9	10	Final
Marlee Powers	0	0	0	0	0	1	0	1	0	X	2
Tanya Hilliard	0	1	0	1	2	0	1	0	2	X	7

== Playoffs ==
Semifinal			Final
			A	Christina Black
B	Christina Black	9	B	Christina Black
C	Tanya Hilliard	4

=== Semifinal ===
Sunday, January 29, 7:00 pm

Sheet 3	1	2	3	4	5	6	7	8	9	10	Final
Tanya Hilliard	0	0	1	0	1	0	0	2	X	X	4
Christina Black	2	0	0	2	0	2	3	0	X	X	9

=== Final ===
- Not needed as Team Black would've needed to be beaten twice

2023 Nova Scotia Scotties Tournament of Hearts

Christina Black
5th Nova Scotia Provincial Championship title
