= Nova Scotia Women's Curling Championship =

Canadian provincial curling tournament

Ocean Contractors Women's Curling Championship
- Established: 1958
- 2026 host city: Halifax, Nova Scotia
- 2026 arena: Halifax Curling Club
- 2026 champion: Taylour Stevens

Current edition
- 2026 Ocean Contractors Women's Curling Championship

The Ocean Contractors Women's Curling Championship, formerly the Nova Scotia Scotties Tournament of Hearts is the Nova Scotia provincial women's curling tournament. The tournament is run by the Nova Scotia Curling Association. The winning team represents Nova Scotia at the Scotties Tournament of Hearts.

In May 2026, the tournament's championship trophy was renamed the Colleen Jones Memorial trophy, honouring the late 16-time provincial champion.

== Past winners ==
List of previous winners by year. National champions in bold.

Year	Skip	Club
2026	Taylour Stevens	Halifax
2025	Christina Black	Halifax
2024	Heather Smith	Halifax
2023	Christina Black	Dartmouth
2022	Christina Black	Dartmouth
2021	Cancelled due to the COVID-19 pandemic in Nova Scotia. Team Jill Brothers to represent Nova Scotia at Scotties	Mayflower
2020	Mary-Anne Arsenault	Mayflower
2019	Jill Brothers	Mayflower
2018	Mary-Anne Arsenault	Dartmouth
2017	Mary Mattatall	Windsor
2016	Jill Brothers	Mayflower
2015	Mary-Anne Arsenault	Mayflower
2014	Heather Smith	Mayflower
2013	Mary-Anne Arsenault	Mayflower
2012	Heather Smith-Dacey	CFB Halifax
2011	Heather Smith-Dacey	Mayflower
2010	Nancy McConnery	Dartmouth
2009	Nancy McConnery	Dartmouth
2008	Mary-Anne Arsenault	Mayflower
2007	Jill Mouzar	Mayflower
2006	Colleen Jones	Mayflower
2005	Kay Zinck	Mayflower
2004	Heather Smith-Dacey	Mayflower
2003	Nancy McConnery	Mayflower
2002	Meredith Doyle	Mayflower
2001	**Colleen Jones**	Mayflower
2000	Kay Zinck	Mayflower
1999	**Colleen Jones**	Mayflower
1998	Mary Mattatall	Mayflower
1997	Colleen Jones	Mayflower
1996	Colleen Jones	Halifax
1995	Virginia Jackson	Mayflower
1994	Colleen Jones	Halifax
1993	Colleen Jones	Halifax
1992	Colleen Jones	Halifax
1991	Colleen Jones	Halifax
1990	Heather Rankin	Halifax
1989	Colleen Jones	Halifax
1988	Judy Burgess	Truro
1987	Virginia Jackson	CFB Halifax
1986	Colleen Jones	Halifax
1985	Virginia Jackson	CFB Halifax
1984	Colleen Jones	Halifax
1983	**Penny LaRocque**	CFB Halifax
1982	**Colleen Jones**	Halifax
1981	Judy Burgess	Truro
1980	Colleen Jones	CFB Halifax
1979	Penny LaRocque	CFB Halifax
1978	Penny LaRocque	Dartmouth
1977	Jean Skinner	Sydney
1976	Gwen Osborne	Dartmouth Ladies
1975	Phyliss MacDonald	Halifax
1974	Joyce Myers	Mayflower
1973	Elizabeth Hodgins	Dartmouth Ladies
1972	Helen Rowe	Greenwood
1971	Clare Purdy	Stellar
1970	Audrey Thorbourne	Liverpool
1969	Mary Naddaf	North Sydney
1968	Shirley Robertson	Mayflower
1967	Helen Rowe	Greenwood
1966	Irene Snow	Halifax Ladies
1965	Audrey Thorbourne	Liverpool
1964	Irene Snow	Halifax Ladies
1963	Shirley Robertson	Mayflower
1962	Pearl Carter	Dartmouth
1961	Mona Rhodenizer	Lunenburg
1960	Marge Harris	Liverpool
1959	Irene Snow	Halifax
1958	Jimmie MacDonald	Middleton
