= Danielle Parsons =

Canadian curler

- Curler
- Born: January 29, 1990 (age 36); Halifax, Nova Scotia

Team
- Curling club: Gage G&CC, Oromocto, New Brunswick
- Skip: Julie McEvoy
- Third: Danielle Parsons
- Second: Sheena Moore
- Lead: Jill Thomas

Curling career
- Member Association: Nova Scotia (2007–12; 2017–present); New Brunswick (2012–16)
- Hearts: 3 (2011, 2012, 2013)
- Top CTRS ranking: 23rd (2011–12)
Medal record
Women's Curling
Representing Nova Scotia
Scotties Tournament of Hearts
Bronze medal – third place	2011 Charlottetown

Danielle Barbara Parsons (born January 29, 1990) is a Canadian curler from Fredericton, New Brunswick.

== Career ==
Parsons was born in Halifax, Nova Scotia, and made her first national curling debut at the 2008 Canadian Junior Curling Championships. She skipped her own team, representing Nova Scotia at the women's event. Her team had success at the event finishing with a round robin record of 9-3. Her team lost the semi-final to Saskatchewan and received a bronze medal.

Parsons joined the Heather Smith-Dacey team in December 2010, when Smith-Dacey's skip Colleen Jones was hospitalized for bacterial meningitis. The squad was preparing to enter the qualification round for the 2011 Nova Scotia Scotties Tournament of Hearts, when Jones fell ill. The team went on to qualify for the event, and eventually won the event, defeating Jones’ former teammate Mary-Anne Arsenault in the semi-final and Theresa Breen in the final. The team went on to the 2011 Scotties Tournament of Hearts, where their success would continue. The team finished round robin play with a 7-4 record, which took them to a tie breaker game against British Columbia's Kelly Scott rink. After defeating Scott in the tie breaker, the team met Ontario's Rachel Homan. Homan defeated the Smith-Dacey team in the 3-4 match, sending them to the first ever Bronze Medal Game, where the two teams met again. Smith-Dacey’s team defeated Ontario 9-7 winning the bronze medal game.

Parsons left the Smith-Dacey team at the end of the 2011-2012 season. She has since moved to New Brunswick to throw second stones for Andrea Crawford. The Crawford rink disbanded in 2014.
