= Jennifer Crouse (curler) =

Canadian curler (born 1980)

- Curler
- Other names: JC
- Born: Jennifer Lee Crouse; January 23, 1980 (age 46); Antigonish, Nova Scotia

Team
- Curling club: Halifax CC; Halifax, NS
- Skip: Jennifer Crouse
- Third: Julie McEvoy
- Second: Sheena Moore
- Lead: Kaitlin Fralic

Curling career
- Member Association: Nova Scotia
- Hearts: 3 (2009, 2010, 2018)
- Top CTRS ranking: 22nd (2017–18)
Medal record
Women's curling
Representing Nova Scotia
Scotties Tournament of Hearts
Bronze medal – third place	2018 Pentiction

Jennifer "JC" Lee Crouse (born January 23, 1980, in Antigonish, Nova Scotia) is a Canadian curler from Timberlea, Nova Scotia.

== Career ==
Crouse would win her first provincial title with Nancy McConnery defeating Mary-Anne Arsenault in 2009 throwing third rocks earning the right to represent Nova Scotia at the 2009 Scotties Tournament of Hearts. Unfortunately the team would not make playoffs at the Scotties Tournament of Hearts finishing with a disappointing 2-9 record. The following year Crouse won a second provincial title with Nancy McConnery, defeating Mary-Anne Arsenault in 2010 and the right to represent Nova Scotia at the Scotties Tournament of Hearts again the team ended up with another disappointing finish at nationals at 1–10. The McConnery team disbanded the end of the 2010 season. Crouse went on to skip in 2011, joined a team skipped by Kelly MacIntosh in 2012 - 2015 but was unable to repeat with another provincial title losing the 2014 provincial final to Heather Smith Dacey and a 2015 semifinal to Mary-Anne Arsenault who went on to represent NS at the 2015 Scotties Tournament of Hearts until 2018 winning the provincial Scotties title with team Mary-Anne Arsenault.

Crouse won a third provincial title in mixed as lead with Chris Sutherland finishing 4-7 in 2011 (Representing Nova Scotia at the 2012 National Mixed Curling Championship), and a second provincial mixed title in 2017 as lead with Brent MacDougall and former teammate Christina Black after going undefeated in the provincial playdown. In the 2018 mixed national championship, team nova scotia finished tied for 4th place, however due to elimination of tie breakers was eliminated from playoffs due to their head to head loss over Newfoundland and Labrador resulting in a 5th place overall finish.

In 2016 Crouse joined team Mary-Anne Arsenault as second eventually moving to lead when Jane Snyder left the team. The team won bronze at the 2018 Scotties tournament of hearts after finishing 9-2 in the round robin, and eventually losing the semifinals to team Wild Card.

Jennifer rejoined former teammates Julie McEvoy, Sheena Moore (Gilman) and Jill Thomas in 2018.

== Personal life ==
Jennifer Crouse is an Account Executive with Desjardins
