= Mary-Anne Arsenault =

Canadian curler (born 1968)

- Curler
- Other names: Mary-Anne Waye
- Born: August 19, 1968 (age 58); Scarborough, Ontario

Team
- Curling club: Kelowna CC, Kelowna, BC

Curling career
- Member Association: Nova Scotia (1993–2020); British Columbia (2020–2022)
- Hearts: 15 (1993, 1999, 2000, 2001, 2002, 2003, 2004, 2005, 2006, 2008, 2013, 2015, 2018, 2020, 2022)
- World Championship: 5 (1999, 2001, 2002, 2003, 2004)
- Top CTRS ranking: 2nd (2003–04)
Medal record
Women's curling
Representing Canada
World Championships
| Gold medal – first place | 2001 Lausanne |
| Gold medal – first place | 2004 Gävle |
| Silver medal – second place | 2003 Winnipeg |
Representing Nova Scotia
Scotties Tournament of Hearts
| Gold medal – first place | 1999 Charlottetown |
| Gold medal – first place | 2001 Sudbury |
| Gold medal – first place | 2002 Brandon |
| Gold medal – first place | 2003 Kitchener |
| Gold medal – first place | 2004 Red Deer |
| Bronze medal – third place | 2006 London |
| Bronze medal – third place | 2018 Pentiction |
Canadian Olympic Curling Trials
| Bronze medal – third place | 2001 Regina |

Mary-Anne Arsenault (born August 19, 1968 in Scarborough, Ontario, also known as Mary-Anne Waye when she was married) is a Canadian former curler from Lake Country, British Columbia. She is a five-time Canadian Champion, and two-time World Curling Champion.

== Career ==
=== 1999–2006 ===
Arsenault joined up with Colleen Jones prior to the 1999 season. She had previously played with Jones, as her lead at the 1993 Scott Tournament of Hearts. Together with Jones, Nancy Delahunt and Kim Kelly, the team would achieve great success, winning 5 Canadian Championships, and 2 World Championships. After a record winning 4 championships in a row, the team would struggle at the 2005 Scott Tournament of Hearts. Finishing round robin play, with a 6-5 record, the Jones team would end up in a four team tiebreaker. They would face Sandy Comeau of New Brunswick in the tiebreaker, where the opportunity to compete for a 5th Canadian Championship was lost, when Comeau defeated Jones 9-4. For the first time since 2001, the Jones team would have to win Provincials to return to the 2006 Scott Tournament of Hearts, which they did. After an impressive showing, the Jones team would finish second place in round robin play. After losing the 1-2 Game to British Columbia's Kelly Scott, they would meet team Canada, Jennifer Jones, in the semi-final. Nova Scotia would lose to Canada, giving the team a third-place finish and a bronze medal. At the end of the season, the team would split up ending a successful eight-year run. With Jones, Arsenault played in every Hearts from 1999 to 2006.

=== 2007–2013 ===
Arsenault would join together once again with Kim Kelly, and Nancy Delahunt, adding long time Jones 5th Laine Peters to the team. They would qualify for the 2008 Scotties Tournament of Hearts in January 2008 by defeating Colleen Pinkney in the Nova Scotia final. They would finish 6-5 in round robin, missing the playoffs.

In 2009 and 2010 Arsenault skipped her team in the Nova Scotia Scotties coming in at 6-1, and 5-2. She lost 7-4 in the 2009 final and 6-5 in the 2010 finals both times to Nancy McConnery who went on to represent Nova Scotia at the 2009 Scotties Tournament of Hearts and the 2010 Scotties Tournament of Hearts. At the 2011 Nova Scotia Scotties Tournament of Hearts, Arsenault finished second with a 5-2 record in round robin play. She would lose the semi-final to Heather Smith-Dacey, who would go on to win the Nova Scotia Championship and finish third at the 2011 Scotties Tournament of Hearts.

In 2011 Arsenault would reunite with former Jones teammate Kim Kelly, who joined Arsenault's team playing second.

For the 2012-2013 season Arsenault and Kelly reunited with former skip Colleen Jones, with the goal of reaching the 2014 Winter Olympics in Sochi, Russia. Jones throws second stones on the team, while acting as the rink's vice skip, or "mate" while Arsenault skips. Jennifer Baxter remains on the rink at lead, while Arsenault's former third of Stephanie McVicar, left the team to play with Heather Smith-Dacey, and Nancy Delahunt joined the team as the 5th. The team qualified for the 2013 Scotties Tournament of Hearts in their first season back together, and finished the event with a 5-6 record.

=== 2013–2020 ===
Colleen Jones left the rink in 2013, and was replaced by Christie Gamble at second. Kelly and Gamble left the team after one season and were replaced by Christina Black and Jane Snyder. Arsenault finally won her first career World Curling Tour event by winning the 2014 Gibson's Cashspiel. She followed this up by winning the Dave Jones Molson Mayflower Cashspiel a month later. The team played in the 2015 Scotties Tournament of Hearts, and finished with a 5-6 record. They failed to return the Scotties in 2016, having lost in the final of the 2016 Nova Scotia Scotties Tournament of Hearts to Jill Brothers.

In 2016, Snyder was replaced by Jennifer Crouse at second. The team had a disappointing record at the 2017 Nova Scotia Scotties Tournament of Hearts, finishing 3-4. After the season, Crouse and Baxter switched positions. With the new lineup order, the team won the 2018 Nova Scotia Scotties Tournament of Hearts and represented Nova Scotia at the 2018 Scotties Tournament of Hearts. There, Arsenault led her rink to a 9-2 round robin record and a spot in the playoffs. In the playoffs, she beat Northern Ontario's Tracy Fleury before losing in the semifinal to Kerri Einarson's "Wildcard" team, settling for bronze medal.

In 2018, Crouse was replaced at lead by Kristin Clarke. On the tour, the team won the New Scotland Clothing Ladies Cashspiel. At the 2019 Nova Scotia Scotties Tournament of Hearts, they lost in the final to Jill Brothers. In 2019 Clarke was replaced by Arsenault's niece Emma Logan. The team won another tour event, The Curling Store Cashspiel. Later in the year they won the 2020 Nova Scotia Scotties Tournament of Hearts and represented Nova Scotia at the 2020 Scotties Tournament of Hearts. At the Scotties, Arsenault led Nova Scotia to a 4-3 record in pool play, but lost in a tiebreaker to British Columbia, failing to qualify for the championship round.

=== 2020–present ===
Following the 2020 Scotties, Arsenault announced she would be moving from Halifax to British Columbia, where she will spend her retirement. On March 3, 2020, Arsenault announced she would be skipping Kelly Scott's former teammates Jeanna Schraeder, Sasha Carter and Renee Simons for the 2020–21 season. The team played in one event during the abbreviated season, finishing runner-up at the Sunset Ranch Kelowna Double Cash to Team Corryn Brown. Due to the COVID-19 pandemic in British Columbia, the 2021 provincial championship was cancelled. As the reigning provincial champions, Team Brown was invited to represent British Columbia at the 2021 Scotties Tournament of Hearts, which they accepted, ending the season for Team Arsenault.

The next season, the team again reached the final of the Sunset Ranch Kelowna Double Cash, losing to the Kaila Buchy junior rink. They were able to compete in their provincial championship at the 2022 British Columbia Scotties Tournament of Hearts in Kamloops from January 5 to 9. After losing to Team Kayla MacMillan in both the A Final and 1 vs. 2 page playoff game, Team Arsenault defeated MacMillan 8–6 in the final to win the provincial championship. At the 2022 Scotties Tournament of Hearts, the team finished with a 3–5 round robin record, defeating Quebec, the Northwest Territories and the Yukon in their three victories. Also during the 2021–22 season, Arsenault skipped the British Columbia Senior Women's Team of Penny Shantz, Diane Gushulak and Grace MacInnes at the 2021 Canadian Senior Curling Championships. The team finished 8–2 through the round robin and championship pools, qualifying for the semifinal. They then defeated Nova Scotia before losing to Saskatchewan's Sherry Anderson in the final, settling for silver.

== Personal life ==
Arsenault is a registered massage therapist and is a partner at the Academy of Curling. She is married to Alan Shepherd. She has one daughter, and is the aunt of Emma Logan.

== Grand Slam record ==
Key
| C | Champion |
| F | Lost in Final |
| SF | Lost in Semifinal |
| QF | Lost in Quarterfinals |
| R16 | Lost in the round of 16 |
| Q | Did not advance to playoffs |
| T2 | Played in Tier 2 event |
| DNP | Did not participate in event |
| N/A | Not a Grand Slam event that season |

| Event | 2006–07 | 2007–08 | 2008–09 | 2009–10 | 2010–11 | 2011–12 | 2012–13 | 2013–14 | 2014–15 | 2015–16 | 2016–17 | 2017–18 | 2018–19 | 2019–20 |
|---|---|---|---|---|---|---|---|---|---|---|---|---|---|---|
| Masters | N/A | N/A | N/A | N/A | N/A | N/A | Q | DNP | DNP | QF | DNP | DNP | DNP | DNP |
| Tour Challenge | N/A | N/A | N/A | N/A | N/A | N/A | N/A | N/A | N/A | DNP | DNP | DNP | T2 | T2 |
| Players' | DNP | Q | DNP | DNP | DNP | DNP | DNP | Q | DNP | DNP | DNP | DNP | DNP | N/A |

=== Former events ===
| Event | 2006–07 | 2007–08 | 2008–09 | 2009–10 | 2010–11 | 2011–12 | 2012–13 | 2013–14 |
|---|---|---|---|---|---|---|---|---|
| Colonial Square | N/A | N/A | N/A | N/A | N/A | N/A | DNP | Q |
| Sobeys Slam | N/A | Q | QF | N/A | DNP | N/A | N/A | N/A |
