= Marg Cutcliffe =

Canadian curler

Medal record

Curling

Representing Nova Scotia

Scott Tournament of Hearts
Bronze medal – third place	1985 Winnipeg	

Margaret "Marg" Cutcliffe (born February 28, 1955, in Springhill, Nova Scotia) is a Canadian curler from Fall River, Nova Scotia.

== Career ==
Cutcliffe is a three-time provincial women's champion, winning the Nova Scotia Scotties Tournament of Hearts in 1985, 1987 and 2017. Her wins in 1985 and 1987 were playing third for Virginia Jackson and in the 2017 Scotties, she played third for Mary Mattatall. These three wins earned those teams the right to represent Nova Scotia at their respective national championships, the Scotties Tournament of Hearts. At the 1985 Scott Tournament of Hearts, the Jackson-led Nova Scotia rink finished the round robin with an 8–3 record, only to lose in the semifinal. At the 1987 Scott Tournament of Hearts, the team was less successful, finishing with a 3–8 record, in 11th place.

In Mixed curling, Cutcliffe has won three provincial mixed titles, in 1986, 1990 and 2004 playing third for Don Lowdon, Dave Jones and lead for Steve Ogden, respectively. These teams would represent Nova Scotia at the Canadian Mixed Curling Championship those years. She finished 6-5 (lost in tie breaker) in 1986, 7-4 (lost in tie beaker) in 1990 and 6–5 at the 2004 Canadian Mixed Curling Championship.

In Senior play, she has won five Nova Scotia provincial titles, in 2006 and 2007 (playing third and throwing skip rocks for Penny LaRocque in 2017 and 2018 playing third for Mary Mattatall and 2019 playing third for Nancy McConnery. At the 2006 Canadian Senior Curling Championships, her team went 8–3, losing in the semi-final, while at the 2007 Canadian Senior Curling Championships, her team went 8–3, losing in a tie-breaker. In 2017, Team Mattatall, in Fredericton, New Brunswick, finished fifth with 5–4 record. In 2018, at the Canadian Seniors in Stratford, Ontario, Team Mattatall went 9-1 through the round robin, but lost the final to Saskatchewan's Sherry Anderson in an extra end. In 2019, in Chilliwack, BC, Team McConnery finished 6–4, tied for fourth.

In Masters play, Cutcliffe skipped the Nova Scotia team at the 2016 Canadian Masters Curling Championships in Kentville, NS, leading her province all the way to the final, where she lost to Saskatchewan's Merle Kopach. In 2018, she joined forces with Colleen Pinkney to take the Nova Scotia Masters title. The team finished first after round robin play, but came up short in the 1–4 game. The team went on to win the bronze medal. In 2020, Pinkney regained the Nova Scotia Masters title, but cancellation of the Canadian championship in Saint John, NB prevented teams from competing. In 2023, Cutcliffe played third for Team Virginia Jackson and again won the NS Masters. They finished with a 5-4 record in Saint John, NB. In 2024, Cutcliffe joined Team Marion MacAulay to once again win the Nova Scotia Masters. They went 5-4 in Chicoutimi, Quebec finishing in fifth place.

Cutcliffe was voted Nova Scotia Female Athlete of the Year in 2007 and again in 2017 by the Nova Scotia Curling Association. She was also nominated for the Support4Sports Female Team Athlete of the Year in 2017. Cutcliffe was inducted into the Nova Scotia Curling Hall of Fame in 2020 as a curler.

On the World Curling Tour, Cutcliffe has won two events as a member of the Mattatall rink, the 2015 Lady Monctonian Invitational Spiel. and the 2019 New Scotland Clothing Ladies Cashspiel.

== Personal life ==
Cutcliffe is a pharmacist who retired as the Director of Pharmacy at IWK Health in Halifax in 2022. She is married to Don Cutcliffe and is the mother of three. She attended Dalhousie University.
