= Nancy McConnery =

Canadian curler

- Curler
- Born: February 26, 1963 (age 63); Ottawa, Ontario, Canada

Team
- Curling club: Windsor CC, Windsor, NS
- Skip: Nancy McConnery
- Third: Jocelyn Nix
- Second: Mackenzie Proctor
- Lead: Shelley Barker

Curling career
- Hearts: 5 (1993, 1995, 2003, 2009, 2010)
- Top CTRS ranking: N/A
- Grand Slam victories: 0

Nancy McConnery (born Nancy Horne on February 26, 1963) is a Canadian curler from Blockhouse, Nova Scotia. She currently skips her own team out of the Windsor Curling Club in Windsor, Nova Scotia.

McConnery has represented both New Brunswick and Nova Scotia at the Scotties Tournament of Hearts. Her first Scott appearance was in 1993 representing New Brunswick. McConnery skipped her team which included Sandy Comeau. They would finish 2-9 in round robin play. She would once again return to the Scott in 1995 this time playing second for Heidi Hanlon, and would finish 4-7 in round robin play. McConnery’s next appearance would be in 2003 where she skipped her own team, this time representing Nova Scotia. She would finish round robin play 5-6, her best showing at the Tournament of Hearts to date. McConnery wouldn’t return to the Scotties until 2009, again skipping her own team where she finished round robin with a 2-9 record. She would once again represent Nova Scotia in 2010 where her record would be the worst showing to date. She would finish round robin play with a 1-10 record.

McConnery is married and has two children. She is a graduate of Brock University's Physical Education program, and the Canadian College of Massage and Hydrotherapy.
