= 2022 Stu Sells 1824 Halifax Classic =

- Host city: Halifax, Nova Scotia
- Arena: Halifax Curling Club
- Dates: November 9–13
- Men's winner: (Ontario) Team Epping
- Curling club: Leaside CC, Toronto
- Skip: John Epping
- Third: Mat Camm
- Second: Pat Janssen
- Lead: Scott Chadwick
- Finalist: (Ontario) Jason Camm
- Women's winner: (Manitoba) Team Lawes
- Curling club: Fort Rouge CC, Winnipeg
- Skip: Selena Njegovan
- Third: Laura Walker
- Second: Jocelyn Peterman
- Lead: Kristin MacCuish
- Finalist: (Nova Scotia) Christina Black

The 2022 Stu Sells 1824 Halifax Classic was held from November 9 to 13 at the Halifax Curling Club in Halifax, Nova Scotia. The event was held in a triple knockout format with a purse of $24,000 on both the men's and women's sides. It was the fifth Stu Sells sponsored event held as part of the 2022–23 season.

== Men ==
=== Teams ===
The teams are listed as follows:

Skip	Third	Second	Lead	Locale
Jason Camm	Ian Dickie	Zack Shurtleff	Punit Sthankiya	Cornwall, Ontario
Cameron MacKenzie (Fourth)	Travis Colter (Skip)	Ian Juurlink	Robby McLean	Halifax, Nova Scotia
John Epping	Mat Camm	Pat Janssen	Scott Chadwick	Toronto, Ontario
Bryce Everist	Paul Dexter	Chris MacRae	Taylor Ardiel	Halifax, Nova Scotia
Ryan Abraham (Note: Chris Jeffrey and Kevin Ouellette spared for Paul Flemming and Scott Saccary who were competing at the 2022 Canadian Mixed Curling Championship. Ouellette played lead, Jeffrey played second, lead Phil Crowell played third and second Ryan Abraham skipped the team.)	Phil Crowell	Chris Jeffrey	Kevin Ouellette	Halifax, Nova Scotia
Matthew Manuel	Luke Saunders	Jeffrey Meagher	Nick Zachernuk	Halifax, Nova Scotia
Jordan McNamara	Wil Robertson	Ryan Godfrey	Brendan Laframboise	Ottawa, Ontario
Owen Purcell	Joel Krats	Adam McEachren	Scott Weagle	Halifax, Nova Scotia
Vincent Roberge	Jean-Michel Arsenault	Jesse Mullen	Julien Tremblay	Lévis, Quebec
Cory Schuh (Fourth)	Trent Skanes (Skip)	Spencer Wicks	Mike Mosher	St. John's, Newfoundland and Labrador
Jack Smeltzer	Michael Donovan	Trevor Crouse	Mitchell Small	Fredericton, New Brunswick
Greg Smith	Adam Boland	Chris Ford	Zach Young	St. John's, Newfoundland and Labrador
Tommy Sullivan	Brent MacDougall	Martin Gavin	Kirk MacDiarmid	Halifax, Nova Scotia
Andrew Symonds	Colin Thomas	Chris Ford	Keith Jewer	St. John's, Newfoundland and Labrador
Stuart Thompson	Kendal Thompson	Colton Steele	Michael Brophy	Halifax, Nova Scotia
Nathan Young	Sam Follett	Nathan Locke	Ben Stringer	St. John's, Newfoundland and Labrador

=== Knockout brackets ===
==== A event ====
A Event	Qualifier 1
1	(Ontario) John Epping	6
1	(Nova Scotia) Bryce Everist	7	9	(Nova Scotia) Bryce Everist	8
2	(Nova Scotia) Team Flemming	3	9	(Nova Scotia) Tommy Sullivan	5
2	(Nova Scotia) Tommy Sullivan	7	13	(Nova Scotia) Bryce Everist	10
3	(Ontario) Jason Camm	6	13	(Quebec) Vincent Roberge	6
3	(Newfoundland and Labrador) Trent Skanes	4	10	(Ontario) Jason Camm	5
4	(Quebec) Vincent Roberge	7	10	(Quebec) Vincent Roberge	6
4	(New Brunswick) Jack Smeltzer	5

A Event	Qualifier 2
5	(Nova Scotia) Owen Purcell	7
5	(Ontario) Jordan McNamara	4	11	(Nova Scotia) Owen Purcell	5
6	(Nova Scotia) Travis Colter	4	11	(Nova Scotia) Matthew Manuel	4
6	(Nova Scotia) Matthew Manuel	8	14	(Nova Scotia) Owen Purcell	6
7	(Newfoundland and Labrador) Nathan Young	5	14	(Newfoundland and Labrador) Nathan Young	3
7	(Newfoundland and Labrador) Andrew Symonds	3	12	(Newfoundland and Labrador) Nathan Young	7
8	(Nova Scotia) Stuart Thompson	7	12	(Nova Scotia) Stuart Thompson	2
8	(Newfoundland and Labrador) Greg Smith	6

==== B event ====
B Event						Qualifier 3
15	(Ontario) John Epping	8
15	(New Brunswick) Jack Smeltzer	3	19	(Ontario) John Epping	5
16	(Nova Scotia) Team Flemming	8	19	(Nova Scotia) Team Flemming	4
16	(Newfoundland and Labrador) Trent Skanes	5				23	(Ontario) John Epping	7
						23	(Newfoundland and Labrador) Nathan Young	4

B Event						Qualifier 4
17	(Ontario) Jordan McNamara	5
17	(Newfoundland and Labrador) Greg Smith	4	20	(Ontario) Jordan McNamara	7
18	(Nova Scotia) Travis Colter	7	20	(Nova Scotia) Travis Colter	9
18	(Newfoundland and Labrador) Andrew Symonds	3				24	(Nova Scotia) Travis Colter	9
						24	(Quebec) Vincent Roberge	3

B Event			Qualifier 5
21	(Nova Scotia) Tommy Sullivan	2
21	(Ontario) Jason Camm	8	25	(Ontario) Jason Camm	6
22	(Nova Scotia) Matthew Manuel	9	25	(Nova Scotia) Matthew Manuel	1
22	(Nova Scotia) Stuart Thompson	4

==== C event ====
C Event						Qualifier 6
26	(New Brunswick) Jack Smeltzer	5
26	(Newfoundland and Labrador) Trent Skanes	4	28	(New Brunswick) Jack Smeltzer	3
			28	(Nova Scotia) Stuart Thompson	5
						31	(Nova Scotia) Stuart Thompson	6
						31	(Quebec) Vincent Roberge	0

C Event						Qualifier 7
27	(Newfoundland and Labrador) Greg Smith	3
27	(Newfoundland and Labrador) Andrew Symonds	6	29	(Newfoundland and Labrador) Andrew Symonds	8
			29	(Nova Scotia) Tommy Sullivan	0
						32	(Newfoundland and Labrador) Andrew Symonds	8
						32	(Newfoundland and Labrador) Nathan Young	5

C Event			Qualifier 8
30	(Nova Scotia) Team Flemming	7
30	(Ontario) Jordan McNamara	5	33	(Nova Scotia) Team Flemming	4
			33	(Nova Scotia) Matthew Manuel	5

=== Knockout results ===
All draw times are listed in Atlantic Time (UTC−04:00).
Note: Sheets are ordered 1, 8, 2, 4.

==== Draw 1 ====
Wednesday, November 9, 9:30 am

Sheet 1	1	2	3	4	5	6	7	8	Final
(Ontario) John Epping 🔨	0	2	0	1	0	2	1	0	6
(Nova Scotia) Bryce Everist	2	0	2	0	2	0	0	1	7

Sheet 8	1	2	3	4	5	6	7	8	Final
(Nova Scotia) Team Flemming 🔨	0	0	2	0	0	0	1	X	3
(Nova Scotia) Tommy Sullivan	1	3	0	0	1	2	0	X	7

Sheet 2	1	2	3	4	5	6	7	8	Final
(Ontario) Jason Camm	0	0	2	0	1	2	1	X	6
(Newfoundland and Labrador) Trent Skanes 🔨	0	3	0	1	0	0	0	X	4

Sheet 4	1	2	3	4	5	6	7	8	Final
(Quebec) Vincent Roberge 🔨	2	1	0	2	0	2	0	X	7
(New Brunswick) Jack Smeltzer	0	0	3	0	2	0	0	X	5

==== Draw 3 ====
Wednesday, November 9, 4:30 pm

Sheet 1	1	2	3	4	5	6	7	8	Final
(Nova Scotia) Owen Purcell 🔨	1	1	3	0	1	0	0	1	7
(Ontario) Jordan McNamara	0	0	0	1	0	1	2	0	4

Sheet 8	1	2	3	4	5	6	7	8	Final
(Nova Scotia) Travis Colter	0	2	0	1	1	0	0	X	4
(Nova Scotia) Matthew Manuel 🔨	2	0	4	0	0	1	1	X	8

Sheet 2	1	2	3	4	5	6	7	8	Final
(Newfoundland and Labrador) Nathan Young 🔨	0	2	0	0	0	3	0	X	5
(Newfoundland and Labrador) Andrew Symonds	0	0	0	0	2	0	1	X	3

Sheet 4	1	2	3	4	5	6	7	8	9	Final
(Nova Scotia) Stuart Thompson 🔨	1	2	0	2	0	0	1	0	1	7
(Newfoundland and Labrador) Greg Smith	0	0	1	0	2	2	0	1	0	6

==== Draw 5 ====
Thursday, November 10, 7:45 am

Sheet 1	1	2	3	4	5	6	7	8	Final
(Nova Scotia) Team Flemming 🔨	0	1	1	0	4	0	2	X	8
(Newfoundland and Labrador) Trent Skanes	1	0	0	3	0	1	0	X	5

Sheet 8	1	2	3	4	5	6	7	8	Final
(Ontario) John Epping	4	0	2	2	0	X	X	X	8
(New Brunswick) Jack Smeltzer 🔨	0	2	0	0	1	X	X	X	3

==== Draw 6 ====
Thursday, November 10, 11:00 am

Sheet 8	1	2	3	4	5	6	7	8	Final
(Ontario) Jason Camm	0	0	1	1	1	0	2	0	5
(Quebec) Vincent Roberge 🔨	2	1	0	0	0	1	0	2	6

Sheet 4	1	2	3	4	5	6	7	8	Final
(Nova Scotia) Bryce Everist 🔨	2	1	0	1	1	0	2	1	8
(Nova Scotia) Tommy Sullivan	0	0	3	0	0	2	0	0	5

==== Draw 7 ====
Thursday, November 10, 2:15 pm

Sheet 1	1	2	3	4	5	6	7	8	Final
(Nova Scotia) Travis Colter	0	2	0	2	0	0	3	X	7
(Newfoundland and Labrador) Andrew Symonds 🔨	1	0	1	0	0	1	0	X	3

Sheet 8	1	2	3	4	5	6	7	8	Final
(Ontario) Jordan McNamara 🔨	0	0	2	1	1	0	0	1	5
(Newfoundland and Labrador) Greg Smith	1	1	0	0	0	0	2	0	4

==== Draw 8 ====
Thursday, November 10, 5:30 pm

Sheet 8	1	2	3	4	5	6	7	8	Final
(Newfoundland and Labrador) Nathan Young 🔨	1	2	1	2	0	1	X	X	7
(Nova Scotia) Stuart Thompson	0	0	0	0	2	0	X	X	2

Sheet 4	1	2	3	4	5	6	7	8	9	Final
(Nova Scotia) Owen Purcell 🔨	1	0	0	2	0	1	0	0	1	5
(Nova Scotia) Matthew Manuel	0	0	2	0	0	0	1	1	0	4

==== Draw 9 ====
Thursday, November 10, 8:45 pm

Sheet 2	1	2	3	4	5	6	7	8	9	Final
(Ontario) John Epping 🔨	0	1	0	0	1	1	0	1	1	5
(Nova Scotia) Team Flemming	1	0	2	0	0	0	1	0	0	4

Sheet 4	1	2	3	4	5	6	7	8	9	Final
(Ontario) Jordan McNamara 🔨	2	1	2	0	1	0	1	0	0	7
(Nova Scotia) Travis Colter	0	0	0	1	0	5	0	1	2	9

==== Draw 10 ====
Friday, November 11, 9:30 am

Sheet 2	1	2	3	4	5	6	7	8	Final
(Nova Scotia) Tommy Sullivan 🔨	0	1	0	0	1	0	X	X	2
(Ontario) Jason Camm	1	0	0	4	0	3	X	X	8

Sheet 4	1	2	3	4	5	6	7	8	Final
(Nova Scotia) Matthew Manuel 🔨	1	0	4	2	0	2	X	X	9
(Nova Scotia) Stuart Thompson	0	2	0	0	2	0	X	X	4

==== Draw 11 ====
Friday, November 11, 1:00 pm

Sheet 1	1	2	3	4	5	6	7	8	Final
(Nova Scotia) Owen Purcell	0	2	0	3	0	1	0	X	6
(Newfoundland and Labrador) Nathan Young 🔨	0	0	1	0	1	0	1	X	3

Sheet 2	1	2	3	4	5	6	7	8	9	Final
(Nova Scotia) Bryce Everist 🔨	2	0	3	0	0	0	1	0	4	10
(Quebec) Vincent Roberge	0	1	0	2	1	1	0	1	0	6

==== Draw 12 ====
Friday, November 11, 4:30 pm

Sheet 2	1	2	3	4	5	6	7	8	Final
(Newfoundland and Labrador) Greg Smith 🔨	1	0	1	0	0	1	0	X	4
(Newfoundland and Labrador) Andrew Symonds	0	1	0	2	2	0	1	X	6

Sheet 4	1	2	3	4	5	6	7	8	Final
(New Brunswick) Jack Smeltzer	1	0	2	0	0	2	0	0	5
(Newfoundland and Labrador) Trent Skanes 🔨	0	1	0	0	1	0	1	1	4

==== Draw 13 ====
Friday, November 11, 8:00 pm

Sheet 8	1	2	3	4	5	6	7	8	Final
(Nova Scotia) Travis Colter 🔨	2	0	1	0	6	X	X	X	9
(Quebec) Vincent Roberge	0	1	0	2	0	X	X	X	3

Sheet 4	1	2	3	4	5	6	7	8	Final
(Ontario) John Epping	0	0	0	2	1	0	0	4	7
(Newfoundland and Labrador) Nathan Young 🔨	0	3	0	0	0	1	0	0	4

==== Draw 15 ====
Saturday, November 12, 1:00 pm

Sheet 1	1	2	3	4	5	6	7	8	Final
(New Brunswick) Jack Smeltzer	0	0	1	0	0	2	0	0	3
(Nova Scotia) Stuart Thompson 🔨	0	1	0	0	2	0	1	1	5

Sheet 8	1	2	3	4	5	6	7	8	Final
(Newfoundland and Labrador) Andrew Symonds 🔨	5	1	2	X	X	X	X	X	8
(Nova Scotia) Tommy Sullivan	0	0	0	X	X	X	X	X	0

Sheet 2	1	2	3	4	5	6	7	8	Final
(Ontario) Jason Camm 🔨	5	0	0	1	0	X	X	X	6
(Nova Scotia) Matthew Manuel	0	0	0	0	1	X	X	X	1

Sheet 4	1	2	3	4	5	6	7	8	Final
(Nova Scotia) Team Flemming	0	2	1	0	3	1	0	X	7
(Ontario) Jordan McNamara 🔨	2	0	0	1	0	0	2	X	5

==== Draw 17 ====
Saturday, November 12, 8:00 pm

Sheet 8	1	2	3	4	5	6	7	8	Final
(Nova Scotia) Team Flemming	0	1	0	0	0	1	1	1	4
(Nova Scotia) Matthew Manuel 🔨	2	0	2	0	1	0	0	0	5

Sheet 2	1	2	3	4	5	6	7	8	Final
(Newfoundland and Labrador) Andrew Symonds	0	0	1	0	3	1	0	3	8
(Newfoundland and Labrador) Nathan Young 🔨	0	1	0	3	0	0	1	0	5

Sheet 4	1	2	3	4	5	6	7	8	Final
(Nova Scotia) Stuart Thompson 🔨	1	2	0	1	2	X	X	X	6
(Quebec) Vincent Roberge	0	0	0	0	0	X	X	X	0

=== Playoffs ===
Quarterfinals
1	(Nova Scotia) Bryce Everist	4
8	(Nova Scotia) Matthew Manuel	5
4	(Nova Scotia) Travis Colter	3
5	(Ontario) Jason Camm	5
2	(Nova Scotia) Owen Purcell	7
7	(Newfoundland and Labrador) Andrew Symonds	1
3	(Ontario) John Epping	10
6	(Nova Scotia) Stuart Thompson	3

Semifinals
8	(Nova Scotia) Matthew Manuel	5
5	(Ontario) Jason Camm	7
2	(Nova Scotia) Owen Purcell	2
3	(Ontario) John Epping	8

Final
5	(Ontario) Jason Camm	4
3	(Ontario) John Epping	7

==== Quarterfinals ====
Sunday, November 13, 11:30 am

Sheet 1	1	2	3	4	5	6	7	8	Final
(Ontario) John Epping 🔨	0	0	5	0	2	3	X	X	10
(Nova Scotia) Stuart Thompson	0	1	0	2	0	0	X	X	3

Sheet 8	1	2	3	4	5	6	7	8	9	Final
(Nova Scotia) Bryce Everist 🔨	1	0	0	0	1	0	0	2	0	4
(Nova Scotia) Matthew Manuel	0	0	0	1	0	2	1	0	1	5

Sheet 2	1	2	3	4	5	6	7	8	Final
(Nova Scotia) Owen Purcell 🔨	2	0	1	1	1	2	X	X	7
(Newfoundland and Labrador) Andrew Symonds	0	1	0	0	0	0	X	X	1

Sheet 4	1	2	3	4	5	6	7	8	Final
(Nova Scotia) Travis Colter	0	1	0	1	0	1	0	X	3
(Ontario) Jason Camm 🔨	2	0	1	0	1	0	1	X	5

==== Semifinals ====
Sunday, November 13, 3:00 pm

Sheet 2	1	2	3	4	5	6	7	8	Final
(Nova Scotia) Matthew Manuel	0	3	0	2	0	0	0	0	5
(Ontario) Jason Camm 🔨	2	0	2	0	1	1	0	1	7

Sheet 4	1	2	3	4	5	6	7	8	Final
(Nova Scotia) Owen Purcell 🔨	1	0	1	0	X	X	X	X	2
(Ontario) John Epping	0	5	0	3	X	X	X	X	8

==== Final ====
Sunday, November 13, 6:30 pm

Sheet 8	1	2	3	4	5	6	7	8	Final
(Ontario) Jason Camm	0	2	0	0	0	2	X	X	4
(Ontario) John Epping 🔨	2	0	4	1	0	0	X	X	7

== Women ==
=== Teams ===
The teams are listed as follows:

Skip	Third	Second	Lead	Alternate	Locale
Suzanne Birt	Michelle Shea	Meaghan Hughes	Sinead Dolan (Note: Sinead Dolan spared for Marie Christianson who was competing at the 2022 Canadian Mixed Curling Championship. Dolan played lead while lead Michelle McQuaid moved up to play third.)		Charlottetown, Prince Edward Island
Christina Black	Jenn Baxter	Karlee Everist	Shelley Barker		Halifax, Nova Scotia
Theresa Breen	Mary Sue Radford	Julie McMullin	Helen Radford	Heather Smith	Halifax, Nova Scotia
Jennifer Crouse	Julie McEvoy	Sheena Moore	Kaitlin Fralic		Halifax, Nova Scotia
Stacie Curtis	Erica Curtis	Julie Hynes	Camille Burt		St. John's, Newfoundland and Labrador
Jessica Daigle	Kirsten Lind	Lindsey Burgess	Emma Logan	Colleen Jones	Halifax, Nova Scotia
Emily Deschenes	Lauren Ferguson	Alison Umlah	Cate Fitzgerald		Chester, Nova Scotia
Sarah Hill	Kelli Sharpe	Beth Hamilton	Adrienne Mercer		St. John's, Newfoundland and Labrador
Tanya Hilliard	Taylor Clarke	Mackenzie Feindel	Heather MacPhee	Liz Garnett	Dartmouth, Nova Scotia
Danielle Inglis	Kira Brunton	Cheryl Kreviazuk	Cassandra de Groot		Whitby, Ontario
Mackenzie Zacharias (Note: Mackenzie Zacharias skipped Team Jennifer Jones.)	Karlee Burgess	Emily Zacharias	Lauren Lenentine		Winnipeg, Manitoba
Andrea Kelly	Sylvie Quillian	Jill Brothers	Katie Forward		Fredericton, New Brunswick
Selena Njegovan	Laura Walker (Note: Laura Walker spared for Kaitlyn Lawes who was on maternity leave. She played third while third Selena Njegovan moved up to skip.)	Jocelyn Peterman	Kristin MacCuish		Winnipeg, Manitoba
Kristen MacDiarmid	Kelly Backman	Liz Woodworth	Julia Colter		Halifax, Nova Scotia
Brigitte MacPhail	Sadie Pinksen	Kaitlin MacDonald	Alison Taylor	Amanda Skiffington	Iqaluit, Nunavut
Sarah Murphy	Erin Carmody	Kate Callaghan	Jenn Mitchell	Taylour Stevens	Halifax, Nova Scotia

=== Knockout brackets ===
==== A event ====
A Event	Qualifier 1
1	(Manitoba) Team Jones	7
1	(Nova Scotia) Kristen MacDiarmid	4	9	(Manitoba) Team Jones	7
2	(Nova Scotia) Sarah Murphy	6	9	(Nova Scotia) Sarah Murphy	6
2	(Nova Scotia) Jessica Daigle	2	13	(Manitoba) Team Jones	4
3	(Nova Scotia) Christina Black	10	13	(Nova Scotia) Christina Black	5
3	(Nunavut) Brigitte MacPhail	2	10	(Nova Scotia) Christina Black	9
4	(Nova Scotia) Emily Deschenes	7	10	(Nova Scotia) Emily Deschenes	1
4	(Nova Scotia) Jennifer Crouse	4

A Event	Qualifier 2
5	(Manitoba) Team Lawes	6
5	(Newfoundland and Labrador) Stacie Curtis	2	11	(Manitoba) Team Lawes	2
6	(Ontario) Danielle Inglis	9	11	(Ontario) Danielle Inglis	7
6	(Newfoundland and Labrador) Sarah Hill	4	14	(Ontario) Danielle Inglis	2
7	(New Brunswick) Andrea Kelly	5	14	(New Brunswick) Andrea Kelly	6
7	(Nova Scotia) Tanya Hilliard	4	12	(New Brunswick) Andrea Kelly	7
8	(Prince Edward Island) Suzanne Birt	7	12	(Prince Edward Island) Suzanne Birt	5
8	(Nova Scotia) Theresa Breen	3

==== B event ====
B Event						Qualifier 3
15	(Nova Scotia) Kristen MacDiarmid	2
15	(Nova Scotia) Jennifer Crouse	8	19	(Nova Scotia) Jennifer Crouse	1
16	(Nova Scotia) Jessica Daigle	6	19	(Nova Scotia) Jessica Daigle	8
16	(Nunavut) Brigitte MacPhail	2				23	(Nova Scotia) Jessica Daigle	5
						23	(Ontario) Danielle Inglis	9

B Event						Qualifier 4
17	(Newfoundland and Labrador) Stacie Curtis	7
17	(Nova Scotia) Theresa Breen	4	20	(Newfoundland and Labrador) Stacie Curtis	6
18	(Newfoundland and Labrador) Sarah Hill	10	20	(Newfoundland and Labrador) Sarah Hill	5
18	(Nova Scotia) Tanya Hilliard	2				24	(Newfoundland and Labrador) Stacie Curtis	7
						24	(Manitoba) Team Jones	12

B Event			Qualifier 5
21	(Nova Scotia) Sarah Murphy	8
21	(Nova Scotia) Emily Deschenes	3	25	(Nova Scotia) Sarah Murphy	5
22	(Manitoba) Team Lawes	6	25	(Manitoba) Team Lawes	8
22	(Prince Edward Island) Suzanne Birt	1

==== C event ====
C Event						Qualifier 6
26	(Nova Scotia) Kristen MacDiarmid	9
26	(Nunavut) Brigitte MacPhail	2	28	(Nova Scotia) Kristen MacDiarmid	4
			28	(Prince Edward Island) Suzanne Birt	6
						31	(Prince Edward Island) Suzanne Birt	5
						31	(Newfoundland and Labrador) Stacie Curtis	6

C Event						Qualifier 7
27	(Nova Scotia) Theresa Breen	3
27	(Nova Scotia) Tanya Hilliard	7	29	(Nova Scotia) Tanya Hilliard	10
			29	(Nova Scotia) Emily Deschenes	4
						32	(Nova Scotia) Tanya Hilliard	7
						32	(Nova Scotia) Jessica Daigle	2

C Event			Qualifier 8
30	(Nova Scotia) Jennifer Crouse	4
30	(Newfoundland and Labrador) Sarah Hill	7	33	(Newfoundland and Labrador) Sarah Hill	4
			33	(Nova Scotia) Sarah Murphy	5

=== Knockout results ===
All draw times are listed in Atlantic Time (UTC−04:00).
Note: Sheets are ordered 1, 8, 2, 4.

==== Draw 2 ====
Wednesday, November 9, 1:00 pm

Sheet 1	1	2	3	4	5	6	7	8	Final
(Manitoba) Team Jones	0	3	0	1	2	1	0	X	7
(Nova Scotia) Kristen MacDiarmid 🔨	1	0	2	0	0	0	1	X	4

Sheet 8	1	2	3	4	5	6	7	8	Final
(Nova Scotia) Sarah Murphy	1	0	1	2	0	1	1	X	6
(Nova Scotia) Jessica Daigle 🔨	0	0	0	0	2	0	0	X	2

Sheet 2	1	2	3	4	5	6	7	8	Final
(Nova Scotia) Christina Black	2	0	3	1	0	4	X	X	10
(Nunavut) Brigitte MacPhail 🔨	0	1	0	0	1	0	X	X	2

Sheet 4	1	2	3	4	5	6	7	8	Final
(Nova Scotia) Emily Deschenes	0	0	2	0	1	1	1	2	7
(Nova Scotia) Jennifer Crouse 🔨	0	1	0	3	0	0	0	0	4

==== Draw 4 ====
Wednesday, November 9, 8:00 pm

Sheet 1	1	2	3	4	5	6	7	8	Final
(Manitoba) Team Lawes	2	1	1	0	0	2	0	X	6
(Newfoundland and Labrador) Stacie Curtis 🔨	0	0	0	1	0	0	1	X	2

Sheet 8	1	2	3	4	5	6	7	8	Final
(Ontario) Danielle Inglis 🔨	1	2	0	2	0	3	1	X	9
(Newfoundland and Labrador) Sarah Hill	0	0	3	0	1	0	0	X	4

Sheet 2	1	2	3	4	5	6	7	8	Final
(New Brunswick) Andrea Kelly 🔨	0	0	1	1	2	0	0	1	5
(Nova Scotia) Tanya Hilliard	0	1	0	0	0	2	1	0	4

Sheet 4	1	2	3	4	5	6	7	8	Final
(Prince Edward Island) Suzanne Birt 🔨	2	0	0	1	3	0	1	X	7
(Nova Scotia) Theresa Breen	0	1	1	0	0	1	0	X	3

==== Draw 5 ====
Thursday, November 10, 7:45 am

Sheet 2	1	2	3	4	5	6	7	8	Final
(Nova Scotia) Kristen MacDiarmid	0	0	2	0	0	0	X	X	2
(Nova Scotia) Jennifer Crouse 🔨	0	4	0	2	1	1	X	X	8

Sheet 4	1	2	3	4	5	6	7	8	Final
(Nova Scotia) Jessica Daigle	0	2	2	0	1	0	1	X	6
(Nunavut) Brigitte MacPhail 🔨	0	0	0	1	0	1	0	X	2

==== Draw 6 ====
Thursday, November 10, 11:00 am

Sheet 1	1	2	3	4	5	6	7	8	Final
(Nova Scotia) Christina Black 🔨	2	1	0	2	4	X	X	X	9
(Nova Scotia) Emily Deschenes	0	0	1	0	0	X	X	X	1

Sheet 2	1	2	3	4	5	6	7	8	Final
(Manitoba) Team Jones 🔨	0	1	0	3	0	2	0	1	7
(Nova Scotia) Sarah Murphy	1	0	1	0	3	0	1	0	6

==== Draw 7 ====
Thursday, November 10, 2:15 pm

Sheet 2	1	2	3	4	5	6	7	8	Final
(Newfoundland and Labrador) Stacie Curtis	0	0	2	0	1	1	0	3	7
(Nova Scotia) Theresa Breen 🔨	0	1	0	1	0	0	2	0	4

Sheet 4	1	2	3	4	5	6	7	8	Final
(Newfoundland and Labrador) Sarah Hill 🔨	1	0	3	2	0	4	X	X	10
(Nova Scotia) Tanya Hilliard	0	1	0	0	1	0	X	X	2

==== Draw 8 ====
Thursday, November 10, 5:30 pm

Sheet 1	1	2	3	4	5	6	7	8	9	Final
(New Brunswick) Andrea Kelly	0	1	1	0	0	0	2	1	2	7
(Prince Edward Island) Suzanne Birt 🔨	2	0	0	2	1	0	0	0	0	5

Sheet 2	1	2	3	4	5	6	7	8	Final
(Manitoba) Team Lawes	0	0	0	0	2	0	X	X	2
(Ontario) Danielle Inglis 🔨	1	0	1	1	0	4	X	X	7

==== Draw 9 ====
Thursday, November 10, 8:45 pm

Sheet 1	1	2	3	4	5	6	7	8	Final
(Nova Scotia) Jennifer Crouse	0	0	0	1	0	X	X	X	1
(Nova Scotia) Jessica Daigle 🔨	3	0	2	0	3	X	X	X	8

Sheet 8	1	2	3	4	5	6	7	8	Final
(Newfoundland and Labrador) Stacie Curtis 🔨	0	1	2	0	1	0	0	2	6
(Newfoundland and Labrador) Sarah Hill	1	0	0	2	0	0	2	0	5

==== Draw 10 ====
Friday, November 11, 9:30 am

Sheet 1	1	2	3	4	5	6	7	8	Final
(Nova Scotia) Sarah Murphy	1	3	0	2	1	1	X	X	8
(Nova Scotia) Emily Deschenes 🔨	0	0	3	0	0	0	X	X	3

Sheet 8	1	2	3	4	5	6	7	8	Final
(Manitoba) Team Lawes 🔨	1	1	1	1	2	0	X	X	6
(Prince Edward Island) Suzanne Birt	0	0	0	0	0	1	X	X	1

==== Draw 11 ====
Friday, November 11, 1:00 pm

Sheet 8	1	2	3	4	5	6	7	8	Final
(Manitoba) Team Jones	0	1	0	1	0	0	1	1	4
(Nova Scotia) Christina Black 🔨	1	0	1	0	2	1	0	0	5

Sheet 4	1	2	3	4	5	6	7	8	Final
(Ontario) Danielle Inglis 🔨	0	1	0	0	1	0	0	X	2
(New Brunswick) Andrea Kelly	0	0	2	1	0	2	1	X	6

==== Draw 12 ====
Friday, November 11, 4:30 pm

Sheet 1	1	2	3	4	5	6	7	8	Final
(Nova Scotia) Kristen MacDiarmid	0	1	2	2	3	1	X	X	9
(Nunavut) Brigitte MacPhail 🔨	2	0	0	0	0	0	X	X	2

Sheet 8	1	2	3	4	5	6	7	8	Final
(Nova Scotia) Theresa Breen	0	0	1	0	2	0	0	X	3
(Nova Scotia) Tanya Hilliard 🔨	0	2	0	2	0	2	1	X	7

==== Draw 13 ====
Friday, November 11, 8:00 pm

Sheet 1	1	2	3	4	5	6	7	8	Final
(Newfoundland and Labrador) Stacie Curtis	0	0	4	2	1	0	0	X	7
(Manitoba) Team Jones 🔨	2	3	0	0	0	4	3	X	12

Sheet 2	1	2	3	4	5	6	7	8	Final
(Nova Scotia) Jessica Daigle 🔨	0	3	0	1	0	0	1	0	5
(Ontario) Danielle Inglis	2	0	1	0	3	2	0	1	9

==== Draw 14 ====
Saturday, November 12, 9:30 am

Sheet 1	1	2	3	4	5	6	7	8	Final
(Nova Scotia) Jennifer Crouse	0	1	0	0	2	1	0	0	4
(Newfoundland and Labrador) Sarah Hill 🔨	3	0	1	1	0	0	1	1	7

Sheet 8	1	2	3	4	5	6	7	8	Final
(Nova Scotia) Sarah Murphy 🔨	0	1	0	2	0	2	0	X	5
(Manitoba) Team Lawes	1	0	2	0	2	0	3	X	8

Sheet 2	1	2	3	4	5	6	7	8	Final
(Nova Scotia) Tanya Hilliard 🔨	2	1	2	0	0	2	3	X	10
(Nova Scotia) Emily Deschenes	0	0	0	1	3	0	0	X	4

Sheet 4	1	2	3	4	5	6	7	8	Final
(Nova Scotia) Kristen MacDiarmid 🔨	0	2	0	0	1	0	1	X	4
(Prince Edward Island) Suzanne Birt	0	0	2	3	0	1	0	X	6

==== Draw 16 ====
Saturday, November 12, 4:30 pm

Sheet 8	1	2	3	4	5	6	7	8	9	Final
(Prince Edward Island) Suzanne Birt 🔨	1	0	1	0	2	0	1	0	0	5
(Newfoundland and Labrador) Stacie Curtis	0	1	0	2	0	1	0	1	1	6

Sheet 2	1	2	3	4	5	6	7	8	9	Final
(Newfoundland and Labrador) Sarah Hill	0	0	2	0	0	1	0	1	0	4
(Nova Scotia) Sarah Murphy 🔨	1	1	0	1	0	0	1	0	1	5

Sheet 4	1	2	3	4	5	6	7	8	Final
(Nova Scotia) Tanya Hilliard 🔨	2	1	0	0	2	2	X	X	7
(Nova Scotia) Jessica Daigle	0	0	2	0	0	0	X	X	2

=== Playoffs ===
Quarterfinals
2	(New Brunswick) Andrea Kelly	6
8	(Nova Scotia) Sarah Murphy	3
3	(Ontario) Danielle Inglis	4
5	(Manitoba) Team Lawes	7
1	(Nova Scotia) Christina Black	7
6	(Newfoundland and Labrador) Stacie Curtis	4
4	(Manitoba) Team Jones	9
7	(Nova Scotia) Tanya Hilliard	6

Semifinals
2	(New Brunswick) Andrea Kelly	4
5	(Manitoba) Team Lawes	5
1	(Nova Scotia) Christina Black	5
4	(Manitoba) Team Jones	4

Final
5	(Manitoba) Team Lawes	6
1	(Nova Scotia) Christina Black	4

==== Quarterfinals ====
Sunday, November 13, 8:00 am

Sheet 1	1	2	3	4	5	6	7	8	Final
(Ontario) Danielle Inglis	1	0	0	2	0	1	0	X	4
(Manitoba) Team Lawes 🔨	0	4	0	0	1	0	2	X	7

Sheet 8	1	2	3	4	5	6	7	8	Final
(Nova Scotia) Christina Black 🔨	1	0	0	3	1	0	2	X	7
(Newfoundland and Labrador) Stacie Curtis	0	2	1	0	0	1	0	X	4

Sheet 2	1	2	3	4	5	6	7	8	Final
(New Brunswick) Andrea Kelly 🔨	0	2	0	2	0	2	0	X	6
(Nova Scotia) Sarah Murphy	0	0	1	0	0	0	2	X	3

Sheet 4	1	2	3	4	5	6	7	8	Final
(Manitoba) Team Jones 🔨	3	0	1	0	0	3	0	2	9
(Nova Scotia) Tanya Hilliard	0	1	0	2	1	0	2	0	6

==== Semifinals ====
Sunday, November 13, 3:00 pm

Sheet 1	1	2	3	4	5	6	7	8	Final
(Nova Scotia) Christina Black 🔨	0	1	0	2	0	0	1	1	5
(Manitoba) Team Jones	0	0	2	0	0	2	0	0	4

Sheet 8	1	2	3	4	5	6	7	8	Final
(New Brunswick) Andrea Kelly 🔨	1	0	0	1	0	1	1	0	4
(Manitoba) Team Lawes	0	1	1	0	2	0	0	1	5

==== Final ====
Sunday, November 13, 6:30 pm

Sheet 2	1	2	3	4	5	6	7	8	Final
(Manitoba) Team Lawes	1	0	2	0	1	1	0	1	6
(Nova Scotia) Christina Black 🔨	0	0	0	3	0	0	1	0	4
