= Dave Jones Mayflower Cashspiel =

Dave Jones Stanhope Simpson Insurance Mayflower Cashspiel
- Established: 2013
- Host city: Timberlea, Nova Scotia
- Arena: Mayflower Curling Club
- Men's purse: $17,000
- Women's purse: $8,800

Current champions (2026)
- Men: (Nova Scotia) Nick Mosher
- Women: (Nova Scotia) Christina Black

Location in Canada

The Dave Jones Stanhope Simpson Insurance Mayflower Cashspiel is an annual bonspiel, or curling tournament, held at the Mayflower Curling Club in Timberlea, Nova Scotia. It has been held annually since 2013 as a men's and women's tour event. The tournament is held in a triple knockout format.

== Previous names ==
- 2013–2014: Dave Jones Molson Mayflower Cashspiel
- 2015: Dave Jones Stanhope Simpson Mayflower Cashspiel (men's) & Dave Jones Northbridge Mayflower Cashspiel (women's)
- 2016: Dave Jones Mayflower Cashspiel
- 2017–2018: Dave Jones Alexander Keith's Mayflower Cashspiel (men's) & Dave Jones Stanhope Simpson Insurance Mayflower Cashspiel (women's)
- 2019–present: Dave Jones Stanhope Simpson Insurance Mayflower Cashspiel

== Past champions ==
=== Men ===
| Year | Winner | Runner up | Purse (CDN) |
|---|---|---|---|
| 2013 | (Nova Scotia) Lee Buott, Colten Steele, Neil Gallant, Nick Burdock | (Nova Scotia) Mark Dacey, Stuart Thompson, Stephen Burgess, Andrew Gibson | $12,300 |
| 2014 | (Nova Scotia) Mike Flemming, Mike Bardsley, Kyle Schmeisser, Peter Ross | (Prince Edward Island) Adam Casey, Josh Barry, Anson Carmody, Robbie Doherty | $17,800 |
| 2015 | (Newfoundland and Labrador) Brad Gushue, Mark Nichols, Brett Gallant, Geoff Walker | (Switzerland) Sven Michel, Marc Pfister, Enrico Pfister, Simon Gempeler | $27,400 |
| 2016 | (Nova Scotia) Jamie Murphy, Jordan Pinder, Scott Saccary, Phil Crowell | (Nova Scotia) Stuart Thompson, Colten Steele, Travis Colter, Alex MacNeil | $26,000 |
| 2017 | (Nova Scotia) Mark Dacey, Andrew Gibson, Stephen Burgess, Luke Saunders | (Nova Scotia) Chad Stevens, Cameron MacKenzie, Ian Juurlink, Kelly Mittelstadt | $21,000 |
| 2018 | (Nova Scotia) Jamie Murphy, Paul Flemming, Scott Saccary, Phil Crowell | (Ontario) Scott McDonald, Jonathan Beuk, David Staples, Scott Chadwick | $20,000 |
| 2019 | (Quebec) Vincent Roberge, Jesse Mullen, Jean-Michel Arsenault, Julien Tremblay | (Nova Scotia) Stuart Thompson, Colten Steele, Cameron MacKenzie, Travis Colter | $20,000 |
| 2020 | (Newfoundland and Labrador) Brad Gushue, Mark Nichols, Brett Gallant, Joel Krats | (Nova Scotia) Stuart Thompson, Kendal Thompson, Colten Steele, Michael Brophy | $20,000 |
| 2021 | (Nova Scotia) Paul Flemming, Scott Saccary, Ryan Abraham, Phil Crowell | (Quebec) Robert Desjardins, François Gionest, Pierre-Luc Morissette, Marc-Alexandre Dion | $18,800 |
| 2022 | (Prince Edward Island) Adam Casey, Craig Savill, Steve Burgess, Robbie Doherty | (New Brunswick) James Grattan, Scott McDonald, Paul Dobson, Andy McCann | $14,000 |
| 2023 | (New Brunswick) James Grattan, Joel Krats, Paul Dobson, Andy McCann | (New Brunswick) Zach Eldridge, Chris Jeffrey, Jack Smeltzer, Michael Donovan | $14,000 |
| 2024 | (Nova Scotia) Matthew Manuel, Cameron MacKenzie, Jeffrey Meagher, Nick Zachernuk | (New Brunswick) Rene Comeau, Alex Robichaud, Trevor Crouse, Alex Kyle | $14,000 |
| 2025 | (New Brunswick) Jeremy Mallais (Fourth), Scott Jones (Skip), Brian King, Jared Bezanson | (Prince Edward Island) Tyler Smith, Adam Cocks, Ed White (3 player team) | $14,000 |
| 2026 | (Nova Scotia) Calan MacIsaac (Fourth), Nick Mosher (Skip), Owain Fisher, Chris McCurdy | (Nova Scotia) Kendal Thompson, Stuart Thompson, Bryce Everist, Michael Brophy | $17,000 |

=== Women ===
| Year | Winner | Runner up | Purse (CDN) |
|---|---|---|---|
| 2013 | (Nova Scotia) Heather Smith-Dacey, Jill Brothers, Blisse Joyce, Teri Lake | (New Brunswick) Andrea Crawford, Rebecca Atkinson, Danielle Parsons, Jodie deSolla | $5,700 |
| 2014 | (Nova Scotia) Mary-Anne Arsenault, Christina Black, Jane Snyder, Jenn Baxter | (Prince Edward Island) Kathy O'Rourke, Robyn Green, Meaghan Hughes, Tricia Affleck | $9,375 |
| 2015 | (Nova Scotia) Jill Brothers, Sarah Murphy, Blisse Joyce, Teri Udle | (Nova Scotia) Theresa Breen, Tanya Hilliard, Jocelyn Adams, Amanda Simpson | $10,000 |
| 2016 | (Nova Scotia) Jill Brothers, Erin Carmody, Blisse Joyce, Jenn Brine | (Nova Scotia) Theresa Breen, Tanya Hilliard, Jocelyn Adams, Amanda Simpson | $11,100 |
| 2017 | (Nova Scotia) Jill Brothers, Erin Carmody, Sarah Murphy, Jenn Brine | (Nova Scotia) Theresa Breen, Marlee Powers, Jocelyn Adams, Amanda Simpson | $10,400 |
| 2018 | (Nova Scotia) Jill Brothers, Erin Carmody, Sarah Murphy, Jenn Brine | (Prince Edward Island) Veronica Smith, Jane DiCarlo, Sabrina Smith, Whitney Jenkins | $7,500 |
| 2019 | (Japan) Tori Koana, Yuna Kotani, Mao Ishigaki, Arisa Kotani | (Nova Scotia) Theresa Breen, Marlee Powers, Jocelyn Adams, Amanda Simpson | $7,500 |
| 2020 | (Nova Scotia) Jill Brothers, Erin Carmody, Sarah Murphy, Jenn Brine | (Prince Edward Island) Suzanne Birt, Marie Christianson, Meaghan Hughes, Michelle McQuaid | $7,500 |
| 2021 | (New Brunswick) Andrea Crawford, Sylvie Quillian, Jillian Babin, Katie Forward | (Nova Scotia) Jill Brothers, Erin Carmody, Sarah Murphy, Jenn Mitchell | $8,800 |
| 2022 | (Nova Scotia) Sarah Murphy, Erin Carmody, Kate Callaghan, Jenn Mitchell | (Nova Scotia) Taylour Stevens, Lauren Ferguson, Alison Umlah, Cate Fitzgerald | $3,900 |
| 2023 | (Nova Scotia) Kristen MacDiarmid, Kirsten Lind, Julia Colter, Liz Woodworth | (Nova Scotia) Tanya Hilliard, Kelly Backman, Taylor Clarke, Mackenzie Feindel | $8,800 |
| 2024 | (Nova Scotia) Christina Black, Jill Brothers, Marlee Powers, Karlee Everist | (New Brunswick) Melissa Adams, Jaclyn Crandall, Kayla Russell, Kendra Lister | $8,800 |
| 2025 | (New Brunswick) Andrea Kelly, Jennifer Armstrong, Erin Carmody, Katie Vandenborre | (New Brunswick) Melissa Adams, Jaclyn Crandall, Cayla Auld, Kendra Lister, Kayla Russell | $8,800 |
| 2026 | (Nova Scotia) Christina Black, Jill Brothers, Marlee Powers, Lindsey Burgess | (Japan) Ikue Kitazawa, Seina Nakajima, Minori Suzuki, Hasumi Ishigooka | $8,800 |
