= Shelley Barker =

Canadian curler

- Curler
- Born: October 14, 1979 (age 47); Amherst, Nova Scotia

Team
- Curling club: Windsor CC, Windsor, NS

Curling career
- Member Association: Nova Scotia
- Hearts: 2 (2022, 2023)
- Top CTRS ranking: 8th (2022–23)

Shelley Barker (born October 14, 1979, in Amherst) is a Canadian curler from Falmouth, Nova Scotia.

== Career ==
In 2010, Barker played lead on the Nova Scotia rink skipped by Courtney Smith at the 2010 The Dominion Curling Club Championship. The team qualified for the playoffs through a tiebreaker before losing to Alberta in the semifinals. They rebounded in the bronze medal game by defeating Manitoba for third place. She competed in her second national event at the 2016 Canadian Mixed Curling Championship. Playing lead on the team with skip Doug MacKenzie, Jocelyn Nix and husband Richard Barker, the team just missed the playoffs, finishing fifth overall with a 6–4 record.

Barker played for several different skips throughout her career including Sarah Murphy, Kelly Backman and Nancy McConnery, with whom she won the 2016 Lakeshore Curling Club Cashspiel. For the 2018–19 season, she joined the Kristen MacDiarmid with third Kelly Backman and second Karlee Jones. The team made the playoffs in three of their four tour events this season, reaching the semifinals of the Dave Jones Mayflower Cashspiel and the New Scotland Clothing Ladies Cashspiel and the quarterfinals of the Lady Monctonian Invitational Spiel. At the 2019 Nova Scotia Scotties Tournament of Hearts, the team finished in a four-way tie for second place with a 4–3 record. They were able to beat Colleen Jones 11–5 in the tiebreaker before dropping the semifinal 8–6 to Mary-Anne Arsenault. Julie McEvoy took over skipping duties for Kristen MacDiarmid for the 2019–20 season. In their four tour events, they reached the playoffs twice. The team was not able to find success at the 2020 Nova Scotia Scotties Tournament of Hearts, finishing winless through their seven games.

Team McEvoy disbanded after just one season together. For the 2020–21 season, Everist and Barker teamed up with Christina Black and Jenn Baxter. In their first event together, the team won the 2020 The Curling Store Cashspiel. The 2021 Nova Scotia Scotties was cancelled due to the COVID-19 pandemic in Nova Scotia, so the Nova Scotia Curling Association appointed Team Jill Brothers to represent the province at the 2021 Scotties Tournament of Hearts.

Team Black won their first event of the 2021–22 season, The Curling Store Cashspiel, going undefeated to claim the title. They also reached the final of the Atlantic Superstore Monctonian Challenge, losing to the Andrea Crawford rink. In November, the team once again went undefeated to win the Tim Hortons Spitfire Arms Cash Spiel, defeating Jennifer Crouse in the final. At the 2022 Nova Scotia Scotties Tournament of Hearts, Team Black won all three qualifying events, winning the provincial title and securing their spot at the 2022 Scotties Tournament of Hearts. At the Hearts, Team Black finished the round robin with a 5–3 record, which was enough to qualify for the championship round. Along the way, they scored victories over higher seeded teams such as Alberta's Laura Walker and Manitoba's Mackenzie Zacharias. In their championship round match against Northern Ontario's Krista McCarville, Team Black got down 9–1 before coming back to make the game 9–8, eventually losing 11–8. This eliminated them from the championship.

The Black rink began the 2022–23 season at the inaugural PointsBet Invitational where they lost to Kelsey Rocque in the opening round. They bounced back immediately in their next event, however, winning the New Scotland Clothing Women's Cashspiel in a 6–4 final over Tanya Hilliard. At the 2022 Tour Challenge Tier 2 Grand Slam of Curling event, the team went undefeated until the semifinals where they were defeated by Jessie Hunkin. Through November and December, they qualified for three straight finals. After losing to the Kaitlyn Lawes rink, skipped by Selena Njegovan, in the final of the 2022 Stu Sells 1824 Halifax Classic, they once again defeated Jennifer Crouse at the Tim Hortons Spitfire Arms Cash Spiel and then beat Marlee Powers in the final of the Bogside Cup. At the 2023 Nova Scotia Scotties Tournament of Hearts, Team Black won both the A and B events to earn two of the three spots in the playoffs. They then beat the Hilliard rink 9–4 in the semifinals to claim their second consecutive Nova Scotia Scotties title. This qualified the team for the 2023 Scotties Tournament of Hearts in Kamloops, British Columbia where they again went 5–3 through the round robin. This qualified them for a tiebreaker where they stole in an extra end to upset the Lawes Wild Card rink. In the championship round, they again stole in an extra to beat Ontario's Rachel Homan rink before losing to Northern Ontario's McCarville in the seeding game. They then fell 9–4 to Team Canada's Kerri Einarson in the 3 vs. 4 game, settling for fourth.

The 2023–24 season began well for Team Black as they reached the final of the Summer Series, losing 5–4 to Danielle Inglis. In their third event, they reached another final where they narrowly lost to Jessica Daigle. With their success from the previous season, the team qualified as the sixth seeds for the 2023 PointsBet Invitational. After defeating Nancy Martin in the opening round, they upset Jennifer Jones in the quarterfinals before dropping the semifinal to Rachel Homan. In their next two events, the team reached the quarterfinals of both the 2023 Tour Challenge Tier 2 and the Stu Sells 1824 Halifax Classic, losing out to Madeleine Dupont and Stefania Constantini respectively. In November 2023, the team ranked sixteenth in the world, qualifying them for the 2023 National Tier 1 Slam. They finished with a 1–3 record, earning a victory over Korea's Ha Seung-youn. At the 2024 Nova Scotia Scotties Tournament of Hearts, the team easily qualified for the playoffs through the A event. They then lost to Heather Smith in the 1 vs. 2 game but defeated Mackenzie Mitchell in the semifinal to reach the final. There, they could not defend their provincial title for a third time, dropping the final 6–4 to Team Smith. After the season, Barker stepped back from competitive women's play.

== Personal life ==
Barker is employed as a small business credit coach at the Royal Bank of Canada. She is married to Richard Barker.

== Teams ==
| Season | Skip | Third | Second | Lead |
|---|---|---|---|---|
| 2010–11 | Courtney Smith | Abby Miller | Heather Ross | Shelley Barker |
| 2011–12 | Sarah Rhyno | Jenn Brine | Christie Lang | Shelley Barker |
| 2012–13 | Kelly MacIntosh | Jennifer Crouse | Sheena Gilman | Shelley Barker |
| 2013–14 | Anne Dillon | Sheena Moore | Jill Thomas | Shelley Barker |
| 2014–15 | Jocelyn Nix | Julie McEvoy | Sheena Moore | Shelley Barker |
| 2015–16 | Jocelyn Nix | Liz Woodworth | Julia Colter | Shelley Barker |
| 2016–17 | Nancy McConnery | Jocelyn Nix | MacKenzie Proctor | Shelley Barker |
| 2017–18 | Emily Dwyer | Karlee Jones | MacKenzie Proctor | Shelley Barker |
| 2018–19 | Kristen MacDiarmid | Kelly Backman | Karlee Jones | Shelley Barker |
| 2019–20 | Julie McEvoy | Kelly Backman | Karlee Jones | Shelley Barker |
| 2020–21 | Christina Black | Jenn Baxter | Karlee Jones | Shelley Barker |
| 2021–22 | Christina Black | Jenn Baxter | Karlee Everist | Shelley Barker |
| 2022–23 | Christina Black | Jenn Baxter | Karlee Everist | Shelley Barker |
| 2023–24 | Christina Black | Jenn Baxter | Karlee Everist | Shelley Barker |
