= 2010 Sobeys Slam =

Women's Grand Slam curling event

- Host city: New Glasgow, Nova Scotia
- Arena: John Brother; MacDonald Stadium
- Dates: November 11–14
- Winner: (Manitoba) Team Jones
- Curling club: St. Vital Curling Club, Winnipeg
- Skip: Jennifer Jones
- Third: Kaitlyn Lawes
- Second: Jill Officer
- Lead: Dawn Askin
- Finalist: (Manitoba) Chelsea Carey

The 2010 Sobeys Slam was the third women's Grand Slam event of the 2010–11 curling season. It took place from November 11 to 14 at the John Brother MacDonald Stadium in New Glasgow, Nova Scotia.

It was the third ever Sobeys Slam event, and the first held since the event was put on hiatus during the 2009–10 season. The total prize pool of the event is CAD $60,000, and the winner of the event, Jennifer Jones, received CAD $12,000.

== Teams ==
Skip	Third	Second	Lead	Locale
Melissa Adams	Sandy Comeau	Stacey Leger	Sarah Berthelot	Moncton, New Brunswick
Suzanne Birt	Shelly Bradley	Robyn MacPhee	Leslie MacDougall	Charlottetown, Prince Edward Island
Erika Brown	Nina Spatola	Ann Swisshelm	Laura Hallisey	(United States) Madison, Wisconsin
Chelsea Carey	Kristy Jenion	Kristen Foster	Lindsay Titheridge	Morden, Manitoba
Marie Christianson	Christie Lang	Jane Snyder	Anna Sampson	Halifax, Nova Scotia
Jennifer Crouse	Sheena Gilman	Jocelyn Adams	Jill Thomas	Halifax, Nova Scotia
Kerri Einarson	Janice Blair	Susan Baleja	Alison Harvey	Winnipeg, Manitoba
Jacqueline Harrison	Lori Eddy	Kimberly Tuck	Julie Columbus	Elmvale, Ontario
Amber Holland	Kim Schneider	Tammy Schnedier	Heather Kalenchuk	Kronau, Saskatchewan
Rachel Homan	Emma Miskew	Alison Kreviazuk	Lisa Weagle	Ottawa, Ontario
Colleen Jones	Heather Smith-Dacey	Blisse Comstock	Teri Lake	Halifax, Nova Scotia
Jennifer Jones	Kaitlyn Lawes	Jill Officer	Dawn Askin	Winnipeg, Manitoba
Andrea Kelly	Denise Nowlan	Jillian Babin	Lianne Sobey	Fredericton, New Brunswick
Patti Lank	Caitlin Maroldo	Jessica Schultz	Christina Schwartz	(United States) Lewiston, New York
Stefanie Lawton	Sherry Anderson	Sherri Singler	Marliese Kasner	Saskatoon, Saskatchewan
Sherry Middaugh	Jo-Ann Rizzo	Lee Merklinger	Leigh Armstrong	Coldwater, Ontario
Eve Muirhead	Kelly Wood	Lorna Vevers	Anne Laird	Stirling, Scotland
Shelley Nichols	Stephanie LeDrew	Rhonda Rogers	Colette Lemon	St. John's, Newfoundland and Labrador
Erin Carmody (Fourth)	Geri-Lynn Ramsay	Kathy O'Rourke (Skip)	Tricia Affleck	Charlottetown, Prince Edward Island
Cathy Overton-Clapham	Breanne Meakin	Leslie Wilson	Raunora Westcott	Winnipeg, Manitoba
Collen Pinkney	Wendy Currie	Shelley MacNutt	Susan Creelman	Truro, Nova Scotia
Sarah Rhyno	Jenn Brine	Jessica Bradford	Samantha Carey	Halifax, Nova Scotia
Cindy Ricci	Jolene Campbell	Natalie Bloomfield	Kristy Johnson	Estevan, Saskatchewan
Heather Strong	Laura Strong	Jen Cunningham	Stephanie Korab	St. John's, Newfoundland and Labrador
Val Sweeting	Leslie Rogers	Megan Einarson	Whitney More	Edmonton, Alberta
Kirsten Wall	Hollie Nicol	Danielle Inglis	Jill Mouzar	Oakville, Ontario

== Results ==
=== A Event ===
First Knockout
(Prince Edward Island) Suzanne Birt	4
(Newfoundland and Labrador) Shelley Nichols	8
(Ontario) Rachel Homan	6
(Nova Scotia) Colleen Jones	8
(Alberta) Val Sweeting	WO
(Saskatchewan) Cindy Ricci
(Prince Edward Island) Kathy O'Rourke	4
(Nova Scotia) Sarah Rhyno	8
(United States) Erika Brown	10
(New Brunswick) Melissa Adams	2

Quarterfinals
(Manitoba) Jennifer Jones	7
(Newfoundland and Labrador) Shelley Nichols	6
(Nova Scotia) Colleen Jones	3
(Alberta) Val Sweeting	5
(Scotland) Eve Muirhead	6
(Nova Scotia) Sarah Rhyno	1
(Ontario) Sherry Middaugh	7
(United States) Erika Brown	6

Semifinals
(Manitoba) Jennifer Jones	7
(Alberta) Val Sweeting	4
(Scotland) Eve Muirhead	5
(Ontario) Sherry Middaugh	3

Qualifier 1
(Manitoba) Jennifer Jones	1
(Scotland) Eve Muirhead	7

First Knockout
(New Brunswick) Andrea Kelly	6
(Newfoundland and Labrador) Heather Strong	7
(Manitoba) Chelsea Carey	6
(Nova Scotia) Marie Christianson	7
(Ontario) Jacqueline Harrison	5
(Nova Scotia) Colleen Pinkney	3
(Ontario) Kirsten Wall	8
(Nova Scotia) Jennifer Crouse	2
(Manitoba) Kerri Einarson	5
(United States) Patti Lank	4

Quarterfinals
(Saskatchewan) Amber Holland	6
(Newfoundland and Labrador) Heather Strong	1
(Nova Scotia) Marie Christianson	1
(Ontario) Jacqueline Harrison	8
(Saskatchewan) Stefanie Lawton	7
(Ontario) Kirsten Wall	1
(Manitoba) Cathy Overton-Clapham	5
(Manitoba) Kerri Einarson	2

Semifinals
(Saskatchewan) Amber Holland	7
(Ontario) Jacqueline Harrison	3
(Saskatchewan) Stefanie Lawton	7
(Manitoba) Cathy Overton-Clapham	3

Qualifier 2
(Saskatchewan) Amber Holland	2
(Saskatchewan) Stefanie Lawton	8

=== B Event ===
Second Knockout
(Saskatchewan) Cindy Ricci	6
(Ontario) Rachel Homan	5

Quarterfinals
(Nova Scotia) Sarah Rhyno	7
(Prince Edward Island) Suzanne Birt	6
(United States) Erika Brown	7
(Saskatchewan) Cindy Ricci	1

Semifinals
(Nova Scotia) Sarah Rhyno	5
(Ontario) Jacqueline Harrison	6
(United States) Erika Brown	1
(Manitoba) Cathy Overton-Clapham	7

To Qualifier 3
(Ontario) Jacqueline Harrison	6
(Manitoba) Cathy Overton-Clapham	4

Second Knockout
(Newfoundland and Labrador) Shelley Nichols	6
(Prince Edward Island) Kathy O'Rourke	9
(Nova Scotia) Colleen Jones	6
(New Brunswick) Melissa Adams	3

Quarterfinals
(Prince Edward Island) Kathy O'Rourke	6
(Nova Scotia) Colleen Jones	1

To Qualifier 3
(Prince Edward Island) Kathy O'Rourke	6
(Manitoba) Jennifer Jones	7

Qualifier 3
(Ontario) Jacqueline Harrison	2
(Manitoba) Jennifer Jones	7

Second Knockout
(Manitoba) Chelsea Carey	7
(Nova Scotia) Colleen Pinkney	4

Quarterfinals
(Ontario) Kirsten Wall	5
(New Brunswick) Andrea Kelly	4
(Manitoba) Kerri Einarson	7
(Manitoba) Chelsea Carey	6

Semifinals
(Ontario) Kirsten Wall	5
(Ontario) Sherry Middaugh	6
(Manitoba) Kerri Einarson	1
(Alberta) Val Sweeting	8

To Qualifier 4
(Ontario) Sherry Middaugh	8
(Alberta) Val Sweeting	5

Second Knockout
(Newfoundland and Labrador) Heather Strong	7
(Nova Scotia) Jennifer Crouse	2
(Nova Scotia) Marie Christianson	7
(United States) Patti Lank	4

Quarterfinals
(Newfoundland and Labrador) Heather Strong	9
(Nova Scotia) Marie Christianson	5

To Qualifier 4
(Newfoundland and Labrador) Heather Strong	5
(Saskatchewan) Amber Holland	6

Qualifier 4
(Ontario) Sherry Middaugh	2
(Saskatchewan) Amber Holland	10

=== C Event ===
Third Knockout		Semifinals		Qualifier 5
(Nova Scotia) Colleen Jones	3
(Saskatchewan) Cindy Ricci	5	(Saskatchewan) Cindy Ricci	5
(Nova Scotia) Sarah Rhyno	4	(United States) Erika Brown	7
(United States) Erika Brown	9			(United States) Erika Brown	6
				(Ontario) Sherry Middaugh	5

Third Knockout
(Newfoundland and Labrador) Shelley Nichols	9
(New Brunswick) Melissa Adams	1
(Nova Scotia) Colleen Pinkney	9
(Prince Edward Island) Suzanne Birt	4

Semifinals
(Newfoundland and Labrador) Shelley Nichols	2
(Alberta) Val Sweeting	10
(Nova Scotia) Colleen Pinkney	4
(Prince Edward Island) Kathy O'Rourke	9

Qualifier 6
(Alberta) Val Sweeting	6
(Prince Edward Island) Kathy O'Rourke	7

Third Knockout
(Nova Scotia) Jennifer Crouse	5
(United States) Patti Lank	6
(Ontario) Rachel Homan	8
(New Brunswick) Andrea Kelly	7

Semifinals
(United States) Patti Lank	7
(Manitoba) Cathy Overton-Clapham	8
(Ontario) Rachel Homan	7
(Newfoundland and Labrador) Heather Strong	4

Qualifier 7
(Manitoba) Cathy Overton-Clapham	8
(Ontario) Rachel Homan	3

Third Knockout		Semifinals		Qualifier 8
(Manitoba) Chelsea Carey	8
(Nova Scotia) Marie Christianson	7	(Manitoba) Chelsea Carey	10
(Ontario) Kirsten Wall	7	(Ontario) Kirsten Wall	4
(Manitoba) Kerri Einarson	4			(Manitoba) Chelsea Carey	6
				(Ontario) Jacqueline Harrison	3

=== Playoffs ===
Quarterfinals
A1	(Scotland) Eve Muirhead	6
C2	(Prince Edward Island) Kathy O'Rourke	4
C1	(United States) Erika Brown	5
B1	(Manitoba) Jennifer Jones	7
C4	(Manitoba) Chelsea Carey	6
B2	(Saskatchewan) Amber Holland	5
C3	(Manitoba) Cathy Overton-Clapham	8
A2	(Saskatchewan) Stefanie Lawton	4

Semifinals
A1	(Scotland) Eve Muirhead	4
B1	(Manitoba) Jennifer Jones	5
C4	(Manitoba) Chelsea Carey	8
C3	(Manitoba) Cathy Overton-Clapham	4

Finals
B1	(Manitoba) Jennifer Jones	7
C4	(Manitoba) Chelsea Carey	3
