= 2019 Nova Scotia Scotties Tournament of Hearts =

- Host city: Dartmouth, Nova Scotia
- Arena: Dartmouth Curling Club
- Dates: January 21–27
- Winner: Team Brothers
- Curling club: Mayflower CC
- Skip: Jill Brothers
- Third: Erin Carmody
- Second: Sarah Murphy
- Lead: Jenn Brine
- Finalist: Mary-Anne Arsenault

The 2019 Nova Scotia Scotties Tournament of Hearts, the provincial women's curling championship of Nova Scotia, was held from January 21 to 27 at the Dartmouth Curling Club in Dartmouth. The winning Jill Brothers team represented Nova Scotia at the 2019 Scotties Tournament of Hearts in Sydney, Nova Scotia.

== Qualification ==
Qualification method	Berths	Qualifying team(s)
CTRS leaders	2	Mary-Anne Arsenault; Tanya Hilliard
Qualifier	6	Jill Brothers; Kristen MacDiarmid; Theresa Breen; Colleen Jones; Julie McEvoy; Mary Myketyn-Driscoll

== Teams ==
The teams were listed as follows:

Skip	Third	Second	Lead	Alternate	Club
Mary-Anne Arsenault	Christina Black	Jennifer Baxter	Kristin Clarke	Emma Logan	Dartmouth
Theresa Breen	Marlee Powers	Jocelyn Adams	Amanda Simpson		Mayflower
Jill Brothers	Erin Carmody	Sarah Murphy	Jenn Brine	Blisse Joyce	Mayflower
Tanya Hilliard	Taylor Clarke	Mackenzie Proctor	Heather MacPhee		Dartmouth
Kim Kelly (Fourth)	Colleen Jones (Skip)	Mary Sue Radford	Julia Williams		Mayflower
Kristen MacDiarmid	Kelly Backman	Karlee Jones	Shelley Barker		Lakeshore
Julie McEvoy	Jennifer Crouse	Sheena Moore	Jill Thomas	Caeleigh MacLean	Halifax
Mary Myketyn-Driscoll	Brigitte MacPhail	Kaitlyn Veitch	Michelle MacDonald		Mayflower

== Round-robin standings ==
Key
Teams to playoffs
Teams to Tiebreaker

Skip	W	L
Jill Brothers	5	2
Mary-Anne Arsenault	4	3
Kristen MacDiarmid	4	3
Tanya Hilliard	4	3
Colleen Jones	4	3
Julie McEvoy	3	4
Mary Myketyn-Driscoll	2	5
Theresa Breen	2	5

== Round-robin results ==
All draw times are listed in Atlantic Standard Time (UTC-04:00)

=== Draw 1 ===
Monday, January 21, 14:00

Sheet B	1	2	3	4	5	6	7	8	9	10	Final
Colleen Jones	0	3	0	0	0	2	0	0	0	2	7
Mary Myketyn-Driscoll 🔨	1	0	2	1	1	0	0	1	0	0	6

Sheet C	1	2	3	4	5	6	7	8	9	10	Final
Theresa Breen 🔨	0	0	0	0	0	2	0	1	0	X	3
Mary-Anne Arsenault	0	1	0	1	3	0	2	0	1	X	8

Sheet D	1	2	3	4	5	6	7	8	9	10	Final
Jill Brothers 🔨	0	2	1	0	1	0	0	2	1	2	9
Tanya Hilliard	0	0	0	2	0	2	1	0	0	0	5

Sheet E	1	2	3	4	5	6	7	8	9	10	Final
Kristen MacDiarmid 🔨	2	0	4	3	0	X	X	X	X	X	9
Julie McEvoy	0	1	0	0	1	X	X	X	X	X	2

=== Draw 2 ===
Tuesday, January 22, 09:00

Sheet B	1	2	3	4	5	6	7	8	9	10	11	Final
Theresa Breen	0	2	0	2	0	2	0	0	2	0	0	8
Tanya Hilliard 🔨	2	0	1	0	2	0	0	2	0	1	1	9

Sheet C	1	2	3	4	5	6	7	8	9	10	Final
Colleen Jones 🔨	1	0	0	2	0	2	1	1	0	1	8
Julie McEvoy	0	2	0	0	2	0	0	0	2	0	6

Sheet D	1	2	3	4	5	6	7	8	9	10	Final
Kristen MacDiarmid	0	3	0	2	0	2	1	2	X	X	10
Mary Myketyn-Driscoll 🔨	0	0	2	0	1	0	0	0	X	X	3

Sheet E	1	2	3	4	5	6	7	8	9	10	Final
Jill Brothers	0	0	0	2	0	0	1	0	1	X	4
Mary-Anne Arsenault 🔨	0	1	1	0	3	1	0	1	0	X	7

=== Draw 3 ===
Tuesday, January 22, 19:00

Sheet B	1	2	3	4	5	6	7	8	9	10	Final
Kristen MacDiarmid 🔨	0	0	2	1	0	1	0	0	1	2	7
Jill Brothers	4	1	0	0	1	0	1	1	0	0	8

Sheet C	1	2	3	4	5	6	7	8	9	10	Final
Mary Myketyn-Driscoll 🔨	0	1	0	2	0	1	0	1	0	X	5
Tanya Hilliard	2	0	3	0	1	0	2	0	3	X	11

Sheet D	1	2	3	4	5	6	7	8	9	10	Final
Mary-Anne Arsenault 🔨	1	0	0	1	0	0	0	2	0	X	4
Julie McEvoy	0	1	0	0	0	3	3	0	1	X	8

Sheet E	1	2	3	4	5	6	7	8	9	10	11	Final
Colleen Jones 🔨	0	0	0	1	0	1	0	3	0	2	0	7
Theresa Breen	1	1	1	0	1	0	1	0	2	0	2	9

=== Draw 4 ===
Wednesday, January 23, 14:00

Sheet B	1	2	3	4	5	6	7	8	9	10	Final
Mary Myketyn-Driscoll 🔨	0	2	0	0	2	0	2	1	0	0	7
Julie McEvoy	0	0	2	1	0	1	0	0	3	1	8

Sheet C	1	2	3	4	5	6	7	8	9	10	Final
Jill Brothers 🔨	0	0	0	2	0	1	0	1	0	1	5
Theresa Breen	0	0	0	0	1	0	1	0	1	0	3

Sheet D	1	2	3	4	5	6	7	8	9	10	Final
Colleen Jones	0	2	2	0	0	0	2	0	0	0	6
Kristen MacDiarmid 🔨	1	0	0	1	1	1	0	1	1	2	8

Sheet E	1	2	3	4	5	6	7	8	9	10	Final
Mary-Anne Arsenault 🔨	0	0	2	0	0	2	0	3	0	1	8
Tanya Hilliard	0	1	0	1	1	0	2	0	2	0	7

=== Draw 5 ===
Thursday, January 24, 09:00

Sheet B	1	2	3	4	5	6	7	8	9	10	Final
Colleen Jones	0	0	0	1	0	0	1	0	0	X	2
Jill Brothers 🔨	0	1	0	0	1	1	0	1	1	X	5

Sheet C	1	2	3	4	5	6	7	8	9	10	Final
Mary-Anne Arsenault	0	1	0	1	0	0	2	0	3	0	7
Mary Myketyn-Driscoll 🔨	1	0	2	0	1	1	0	2	0	2	9

Sheet D	1	2	3	4	5	6	7	8	9	10	Final
Tanya Hilliard 🔨	0	2	2	2	0	3	X	X	X	X	9
Julie McEvoy	1	0	0	0	0	0	X	X	X	X	1

Sheet E	1	2	3	4	5	6	7	8	9	10	Final
Kristen MacDiarmid 🔨	2	0	1	1	3	0	0	0	1	1	9
Theresa Breen	0	2	0	0	0	1	1	1	0	0	5

=== Draw 6 ===
Thursday, January 24, 19:00

Sheet B	1	2	3	4	5	6	7	8	9	10	11	Final
Mary-Anne Arsenault 🔨	1	1	0	0	1	0	3	0	2	0	1	9
Kristen MacDiarmid	0	0	1	1	0	2	0	3	0	1	0	8

Sheet C	1	2	3	4	5	6	7	8	9	10	Final
Jill Brothers 🔨	1	1	0	0	0	1	0	1	1	0	5
Julie McEvoy	0	0	1	0	3	0	0	0	0	2	6

Sheet D	1	2	3	4	5	6	7	8	9	10	Final
Mary Myketyn-Driscoll	0	2	0	1	2	1	0	1	0	X	7
Theresa Breen 🔨	1	0	2	0	0	0	2	0	1	X	6

Sheet E	1	2	3	4	5	6	7	8	9	10	Final
Colleen Jones	0	0	2	0	1	0	2	0	4	X	9
Tanya Hilliard 🔨	0	0	0	1	0	1	0	2	0	X	4

=== Draw 7 ===
Friday, January 25, 14:00

Sheet B	1	2	3	4	5	6	7	8	9	10	Final
Julie McEvoy 🔨	2	0	0	0	1	0	0	0	0	X	3
Theresa Breen	0	0	2	2	0	2	1	1	2	X	10

Sheet C	1	2	3	4	5	6	7	8	9	10	Final
Tanya Hilliard 🔨	0	2	0	0	2	1	0	1	0	1	7
Kristen MacDiarmid	1	0	1	0	0	0	1	0	2	0	5

Sheet D	1	2	3	4	5	6	7	8	9	10	11	Final
Mary-Anne Arsenault 🔨	2	0	0	0	1	0	0	2	0	0	0	5
Colleen Jones	0	0	0	2	0	0	2	0	0	1	1	6

Sheet E	1	2	3	4	5	6	7	8	9	10	Final
Mary Myketyn-Driscoll 🔨	1	0	2	0	1	0	0	0	2	0	6
Jill Brothers	0	1	0	1	0	3	0	1	0	1	7

== Tiebreakers ==
Saturday, January 26, 09:00

Sheet C	1	2	3	4	5	6	7	8	9	10	Final
Colleen Jones 🔨	3	0	1	0	1	0	0	0	0	X	5
Kristen MacDiarmid	0	2	0	3	0	0	1	3	2	X	11

Sheet D	1	2	3	4	5	6	7	8	9	10	Final
Mary-Anne Arsenault 🔨	0	0	2	0	2	1	0	1	0	1	7
Tanya Hilliard	0	2	0	2	0	0	1	0	0	0	5

== Playoffs ==
Semifinal			Final
			1	Jill Brothers	6
2	Kristen MacDiarmid	6	3	Mary-Anne Arsenault	5
3	Mary-Anne Arsenault	8

=== Semifinal ===
Saturday, January 26, 14:00

Sheet C	1	2	3	4	5	6	7	8	9	10	Final
Kristen MacDiarmid	0	1	0	1	0	2	0	1	0	1	6
Mary-Anne Arsenault 🔨	3	0	1	0	1	0	1	0	2	0	8

=== Final ===
Sunday, January 27, 09:00

Sheet C	1	2	3	4	5	6	7	8	9	10	Final
Jill Brothers 🔨	0	0	1	0	0	1	1	0	1	2	6
Mary-Anne Arsenault	0	1	0	2	0	0	0	2	0	0	5

2019 Nova Scotia Tournament of Hearts

Jill Brothers
4th Nova Scotia Provincial Championship title
