= 2016 Nova Scotia Scotties Tournament of Hearts =

- Host city: Halifax, Nova Scotia
- Arena: Mayflower Curling Club
- Dates: January 19–24
- Winner: Jill Brothers
- Curling club: Mayflower CC, Halifax, Nova Scotia
- Skip: Jill Brothers
- Third: Sarah Murphy
- Second: Blisse Joyce
- Lead: Teri Udle
- Alternate: Jenn Brine
- Finalist: Mary-Anne Arsenault

The 2016 Nova Scotia Scotties Tournament of Hearts, the provincial women's curling championship of Nova Scotia, was held from January 19 to 24 at the Mayflower Curling Club in Halifax. The winning Jill Brothers team represented Nova Scotia at the 2016 Scotties Tournament of Hearts in Grande Prairie, Alberta.

== Teams ==
Teams are as follows:

Skip	Third	Second	Lead	Alternate	Club(s)
Mary-Anne Arsenault	Christina Black	Jane Snyder	Jennifer Baxter		Dartmouth Curling Club, Dartmouth
Theresa Breen	Tanya Hilliard	Jocelyn Adams	Amanda Simpson		Dartmouth Curling Club, Dartmouth
Jill Brothers	Sarah Murphy	Blisse Joyce	Teri Udle	Jenn Brine	Mayflower Curling Club, Halifax
Emily Dwyer	Katrina Bowers	Mackenzie Proctor	Laura Kennedy	Alicia Brine	Mayflower Curling Club, Halifax
Christie Gamble	Brigitte MacPhail	Kaitlyn Veitch	Mary Mattatall	Katarina Danbrook	Mayflower Curling Club, Halifax
Colleen Jones	Kim Kelly	Mary Sue Radford	Nancy Delahunt		Mayflower Curling Club, Halifax
Julie McEvoy	Sheena Moore	Jill Thomas	Caeleigh MacLean	Andrea Saulnier	CFB Halifax Curling Club, Halifax
Colleen Pinkney	Wendy Currie	Shelley MacNutt	Susan Creelamn	Karen Hennigar	Truro Curling Club, Truro

== Round robin standings ==
Key
Teams to Playoffs
Teams to Tiebreaker

Skip	W	L
Arsenault	6	1
Breen	5	2
Brothers	5	2
Jones	4	3
Gamble	3	4
Dwyer	3	4
McEvoy	1	6
Pinkney	1	6

== Results ==
=== January 19 ===
Draw 1

- Jones 10-2 McEvoy
- Brothers 10-3 Pinkney
- Arsenault 9-5 Gamble
- Dwyer 7-4 Breen

=== January 20 ===
Draw 2

- Arsenault 5-4 Pinkney
- Jones 8-6 Dwyer
- Breen 10-7 McEvoy
- Brothers 8-4 Gamble

Draw 3

- Breen 9-4 Gamble
- Arsenault 11-10 McEvoy
- Brothers 6-5 Dwyer
- Jones 6-3 Pinkney

=== January 21 ===
Draw 4

- Arsenault 7-5 Brothers
- Jones 8-7 Breen
- Pinkney 10-8 Gamble
- Dwyer 7-5 McEvoy

Draw 5

- Gamble 8-2 Jones
- Brothers 7-6 McEvoy
- Arsenault 7-5 Dwyer
- Breen 9-8 Pinkney

=== January 22 ===
Draw 6

- Breen 8-7 Brothers
- Gamble 7-4 Dwyer
- McEvoy 9-3 Pinkney
- Arsenault 9-3 Jones

Draw 7

- Dwyer 7-3 Pinkney
- Breen 10-5 Arsenault
- Brothers 8-6 Jones
- Gamble 6-5 McEvoy

== Playoffs ==
Semifinal			Final
			1	Mary-Anne Arsenault	5
2	Theresa Breen	5	3	Jill Brothers	8
3	Jill Brothers	11

=== Semifinal ===
Saturday, January 22, 2:00pm

Team	1	2	3	4	5	6	7	8	9	10	Final
Theresa Breen 🔨	0	1	0	0	1	0	2	1	0	X	5
Jill Brothers	4	0	0	2	0	3	0	0	2	X	11

=== Final ===
Sunday, January 23, 10:00am

Team	1	2	3	4	5	6	7	8	9	10	Final
Mary-Anne Arsenault 🔨	0	1	0	2	0	0	2	0	0	X	5
Jill Brothers	1	0	2	0	1	2	0	1	1	X	8

2016 Nova Scotia Scotties Tournament of Hearts

Jill Brothers
3rd Nova Scotia Provincial Championship title
