= Sarah Murphy (curler) =

Canadian curler

- Curler
- Born: Sarah Rhyno; July 28, 1986 (age 40); Halifax, Nova Scotia, Canada

Team
- Curling club: Mayflower CC, Halifax, NS

Curling career
- Member Association: Nova Scotia
- Hearts: 2 (2016, 2019)
- Top CTRS ranking: 24th (2015–16, 2016–17)

Sarah Murphy (born July 28, 1986 as Sarah Rhyno) is a Canadian curler from Halifax, Nova Scotia. She is a two-time Nova Scotia Scotties Tournament of Hearts champion.

== Career ==
Murphy made her first national appearance at the 2006 Canadian Junior Curling Championships, skipping the Nova Scotia team. After a 7–4 round robin record, her team defeated Northern Ontario in the tiebreaker before losing to Manitoba to claim the bronze medal. Team Murphy (Rhyno at the time) qualified for their first Grand Slam of Curling event at the 2007 Sobeys Slam, going 0–3 in the triple knockout event. In 2010, her team qualified for the playoffs at the 2010 Nova Scotia Scotties Tournament of Hearts where they lost in the semifinal to eventual champion Nancy McConnery. They played in the Sobeys Slam for a second time in 2010, failing to reach the playoffs once again. While still in juniors, Murphy also competed in three U Sports/Curling Canada University Curling Championships representing Saint Mary's University. Her best finishes came in 2008 and 2011 where she skipped the Saint Mary's Huskies to a bronze medal.

After the 2014–15 season, Murphy and longtime teammate Jenn Mitchell (Brine at the time) joined the Jill Brothers rink at third and alternate respectively for the 2015–16 season. The team had a good season on tour, winning the Dave Jones Mayflower Cashspiel and finishing first at the Nova Scotia provincial qualifier. They continued their strong play into the 2016 Nova Scotia Scotties Tournament of Hearts, defeating Mary-Anne Arsenault to claim their first provincial championship as a new team. At the 2016 Scotties Tournament of Hearts, they finished in seventh place with a 6–5 record. Team Brothers started the 2016–17 season by defending their title at the Dave Jones Mayflower Cashspiel and winning the Lady Monctonian Invitational Spiel. They could not defend their title as provincial champions however, losing to Mary Mattatall in the final of the 2017 Nova Scotia Scotties Tournament of Hearts. Team Brothers also won the Dave Jones Mayflower Cashspiel in both 2017 and 2018, making them the champions for four years in a row. They won their second provincial championship at the 2019 Nova Scotia Scotties Tournament of Hearts, stealing two in the final end to defeat Mary-Anne Arsenault 6–5. At the 2019 Scotties Tournament of Hearts, they finished pool play with a 2–5 record, failing to advance to the championship pool.

Team Brothers played in the 2019 Tour Challenge Tier 2 Grand Slam of Curling event, missing the playoffs with a 1–3 record. They also finished runner-up at The Curling Store Cashspiel. They couldn't win their fifth straight Dave Jones Mayflower Cashspiel, losing out in the semifinals to Tori Koana. At the 2020 Nova Scotia Scotties Tournament of Hearts, they lost in the semifinal to Colleen Jones. Due to the COVID-19 pandemic in Nova Scotia, the 2021 Nova Scotia Scotties Tournament of Hearts was cancelled. Since the reigning champions, Team Mary-Anne Arsenault, did not retain three out of four team members still playing together, Team Brothers (the top-ranked Nova Scotia team on the points list for the 2020–21 season) was invited to represent Nova Scotia at the 2021 Scotties Tournament of Hearts, which they accepted. Despite accepting their invitation to the Hearts, Murphy opted not to attend the event due to work and family commitments. This moved Jenn Mitchell up to second and alternate Emma Logan up to play lead. At the Tournament of Hearts, the team finished with a 3–5 record, failing to make it to the championship round.

== Personal life ==
Murphy is employed as a forensic engineer at Contract Engineering Limited. She is married to Ryan Murphy and has three children, Camryn, William, and Quinn.

== Teams ==
Season	Skip	Third	Second	Lead	Alternate
2005–06	Sarah Rhyno	Jenn Brine	Jessica Bradford	Heather Ross	
2006–07	Sarah Rhyno	Jenn Brine	Jessica Bradford	Heather Ross	
2007–08	Sarah Rhyno	Jenn Brine	Jessica Bradford	Heather Ross	
2008–09	Sarah Rhyno	Jenn Brine	Jessica Bradford	Samantha Carey	
2009–10	Sarah Rhyno	Jenn Brine	Jessica Bradford	Samantha Carey	
2010–11	Sarah Rhyno	Jenn Brine	Jessica Bradford	Samantha Carey	
2011–12	Sarah Rhyno	Jenn Brine	Christie Lang	Shelley Barker	
2012–13	Sarah Rhyno	Jenn Brine	Christie Lang	Kaitlin Fralic	
2013–14	Sarah Rhyno	Mary Mattatall	Liz Woodworth	Jenn Brine	
2014–15	Sarah Murphy	Mary Mattatall	Liz Woodworth	Jenn Brine	
2015–16	Jill Brothers	Sarah Murphy	Blisse Joyce	Teri Udle	Jenn Brine
2016–17	Jill Brothers	Erin Carmody	Blisse Joyce	Jenn Brine	Sarah Murphy
2017–18	Sarah Murphy	Mary Mattatall	Liz Woodworth	Jenn Brine	
2018–19	Jill Brothers	Erin Carmody	Sarah Murphy	Jenn Brine	Blisse Joyce
2019–20	Jill Brothers	Erin Carmody	Sarah Murphy	Jenn Brine	
2020–21	Jill Brothers	Erin Carmody	Sarah Murphy	Jenn Brine	Emma Logan
2021–22	Jill Brothers	Erin Carmody	Sarah Murphy	Jenn Mitchell	Kim Kelly
2022–23	Sarah Murphy	Erin Carmody	Kate Callaghan	Jenn Mitchell	Taylour Stevens
