= 2019 Scotties Tournament of Hearts =

Canadian women's curling championships

- Host city: Sydney, Nova Scotia
- Arena: Centre 200
- Dates: February 16–24
- Attendance: 46,796
- Winner: Alberta
- Curling club: The Glencoe Club, Calgary
- Skip: Chelsea Carey
- Third: Sarah Wilkes
- Second: Dana Ferguson
- Lead: Rachelle Brown
- Coach: Dan Carey
- Finalist: Ontario (Rachel Homan)

The 2019 Scotties Tournament of Hearts, Canada's national women's curling championship, was held from February 16 to 24 at the Centre 200 in Sydney, Nova Scotia. The winning team represented Canada at the 2019 World Women's Curling Championship held from March 16 to 24 at the Silkeborg Sportscenter in Silkeborg, Denmark. The final game featured the largest comeback in Scotties Finals history (according to TSN statistics). Alberta's Chelsea Carey came back from a 5–1 deficit, winning the championship 8–6 thanks to 5 total steal points in the second half, and two dramatic misses by Ontario's Rachel Homan.

This year's tournament was notable for Nunavut winning their first Scotties round robin game ever, defeating Quebec's Gabrielle Lavoie 4–3 in Draw 1; and the highest scoring game ever at a Canadian women's curling championship in Draw 10 with Prince Edward Island's Suzanne Birt winning 13–12 in an extra end over New Brunswick's Andrea Crawford, a total match score of 25 points.

Team Canada's Jennifer Jones set a new record for the most Canadian national women's championship game wins as a skip when she skipped the 141st victory of her Scotties career over British Columbia's Sarah Wark in Draw 18 on February 22.

== Teams ==
After winning the 2018 Scotties Tournament of Hearts, Team Jennifer Jones returned to represent Team Canada, but with a lineup change. Following Jill Officer's retirement after the 2017–18 season, the Jones rink added 2016 Scotties champion Jocelyn Peterman to the team as second. Officer would however join the team as their alternate. Many Scotties veterans such as Rachel Homan (Ontario), Chelsea Carey (Alberta), Krista McCarville (Northern Ontario), Kerry Galusha (Northwest Territories), Jill Brothers (Nova Scotia), and Suzanne Birt (Prince Edward Island) won their respective playdowns. Andrea Crawford returned to skip Team New Brunswick after taking some time off and moving to Germany. Tracy Fleury, who had previously represented Ontario and Northern Ontario, won the 2019 Manitoba Scotties Tournament of Hearts after defeating the heavily favoured Kerri Einarson rink. Sarah Wark (British Columbia), Gabrielle Lavoie (Quebec) and Robyn Silvernagle (Saskatchewan) made their Scotties debuts.

Canada	Alberta	British Columbia	Manitoba
St. Vital CC, Winnipeg Skip: Jennifer Jones; Third: Kaitlyn Lawes; Second: Jocelyn Peterman (Note: Team Canada's alternate Jill Officer threw lead stones for the last five ends of Draw 10 and threw second stones during Draw 12.); Lead: Dawn McEwen; Alternate Jill Officer	The Glencoe Club, Calgary Skip: Chelsea Carey; Third: Sarah Wilkes; Second: Dana Ferguson; Lead: Rachelle Brown	Abbotsford CC, Abbotsford Skip: Sarah Wark; Third: Kristen Pilote; Second: Carley Sandwith; Lead: Jen Rusnell (Note: During Draw 5, Team British Columbia's alternate Michelle Dunn threw lead stones for two ends.); Alternate Michelle Dunn	East St. Paul CC, East St. Paul Skip: Tracy Fleury; Third: Selena Njegovan; Second: Liz Fyfe (Note: During Draw 11, Team Manitoba's alternate Taylor McDonald threw second rocks.); Lead: Kristin MacCuish; Alternate: Taylor McDonald
New Brunswick	Newfoundland and Labrador	Northern Ontario	Nova Scotia
Thistle-St. Andrew's CC, Saint John Skip: Andrea Crawford; Third: Jillian Babin; Second: Jennifer Armstrong; Lead: Katie Forward	Re/Max Centre, St. John's Skip: Kelli Sharpe; Third: Stephanie Guzzwell; Second: Beth Hamilton; Lead: Carrie Vautour (Note: Team Newfoundland and Labrador alternate Michelle Jewer threw lead stones during the round robin; Carrie Vautour threw lead stones during Draws 4, 8, and 12.); Alternate: Michelle Jewer	Fort William CC, Thunder Bay Skip: Krista McCarville; Third: Kendra Lilly; Second: Jen Gates; Lead: Sarah Potts; Alternate: Lorraine Lang	Mayflower CC, Halifax Skip: Jill Brothers; Third: Erin Carmody; Second: Sarah Murphy; Lead: Jenn Brine; Alternate: Kim Kelly
Ontario	Prince Edward Island	Quebec	Saskatchewan
Ottawa CC, Ottawa Skip: Rachel Homan; Third: Emma Miskew; Second: Joanne Courtney (Note: Team Ontario alternate Cheryl Kreviazuk threw second stones for the last two ends of Draw 3, for the last four ends of Draw 5 and the last five ends of Draw 13.); Lead: Lisa Weagle; Alternate: Cheryl Kreviazuk	Charlottetown CC, Charlottetown Skip: Suzanne Birt; Third: Marie Christianson; Second: Meaghan Hughes; Lead: Michelle McQuaid	CC Victoria, Sainte-Foy, CC Jacques-Cartier, Sillery & CC Etchemin, Saint-Romuald Skip: Gabrielle Lavoie; Third: Patricia Boudreault; Second: Anna Munroe; Lead: Julie Daigle; Alternate Marie-France Larouche	Twin Rivers CC, North Battleford Skip: Robyn Silvernagle; Third: Stefanie Lawton; Second: Jessie Hunkin; Lead: Kara Thevenot; Alternate: Marliese Kasner
Northwest Territories	Nunavut	Yukon	(Alberta) Wildcard
Yellowknife CC, Yellowknife Skip: Kerry Galusha; Third: Sarah Koltun; Second: Brittany Tran; Lead: Shona Barbour	Iqaluit CC, Iqaluit Fourth: Jennifer Blaney; Third: Alison Griffin; Skip: Jenine Bodner; Lead: Megan Ingram (Note: Team Nunavut alternate Sadie Pinksen threw lead stones during the round robin; Megan Ingram threw lead stones for three ends in Draw 9.); Alternate Sadie Pinksen	Whitehorse CC, Whitehorse Skip: Nicole Baldwin; Third: Hailey Birnie; Second: Ladene Shaw; Lead: Helen Strong	Lethbridge CC, Lethbridge Skip: Casey Scheidegger; Third: Cary-Anne McTaggart; Second: Jessie Haughian; Lead: Kristie Moore; Alternate Susan O'Connor

=== CTRS ranking ===
Member Association (Skip)	Rank	Points
Ontario (Homan)	1	513.711
Canada (Jones)	3	335.285
Alberta (Carey)	4	235.951
Manitoba (Fleury)	5	231.427
(Alberta) Wildcard (Scheidegger)	6	210.455
Saskatchewan (Silvernagle)	7	203.145
British Columbia (Wark)	24	96.228
Prince Edward Island (Birt)	25	94.030
Northern Ontario (McCarville)	32	74.408
Northwest Territories (Galusha)	34	68.803
Nova Scotia (Brothers)	36	64.257
New Brunswick (Crawford)	45	55.839
Newfoundland and Labrador (Sharpe)	NR	0.000
Nunavut (Bodner)	NR	0.000
Quebec (Lavoie)	NR	0.000
Yukon (Baldwin)	NR	0.000

== Wildcard game ==
A wildcard play-in game was played on February 15. It was contested between the top two teams in the Canadian Team Ranking System standings who did not win their respective provincial championships: the Gimli Curling Club's Kerri Einarson rink from Gimli, Manitoba and the Lethbridge Curling Club's Casey Scheidegger rink from Lethbridge, Alberta. Team Wildcard entered the Scotties as the number 4 seed.

In advance of the 2018–19 season, Rachel Homan was guaranteed a spot in the wildcard game if her team did not win their provincial championship. The team was forced to decline their Team Canada berth in the 2018 Scotties due to qualifying for the Olympics. However, had Homan been eliminated from the provincials, her team would have qualified for the game without the guaranteed spot as they led the CTRS standings.

CTRS standings for wildcard game

Rank	Team	Member Association	Eligibility
1	~~Rachel Homan~~	Ontario	Won Ontario provincials
2	Kerri Einarson	Manitoba	Eliminated from provincials
3	~~Jennifer Jones~~	Manitoba	Qualified as Team Canada (ineligible)
4	~~Chelsea Carey~~	Alberta	Won Alberta provincials
5	~~Tracy Fleury~~	Manitoba	Won Manitoba provincials
6	Casey Scheidegger	Alberta	Eliminated from provincials

Wildcard Game

Friday, February 15, 19:30

Sheet C	1	2	3	4	5	6	7	8	9	10	Final
(Manitoba) Kerri Einarson 🔨	1	0	1	1	0	0	0	2	1	0	6
(Alberta) Casey Scheidegger	0	1	0	0	2	1	2	0	0	1	7

Player percentages
(Manitoba) Team Einarson		(Alberta) Team Scheidegger	
Briane Meilleur	88%	Kristie Moore	88%
Shannon Birchard	78%	Jessie Haughian	74%
Val Sweeting	73%	Cary-Anne McTaggart	76%
Kerri Einarson	56%	Casey Scheidegger	68%
Total	73%	Total	76%

== Map of teams ==
Team Canada Provincial Winners Wild-Card Team

== Round robin standings ==
Final Round Robin Standings

Key
Teams to championship round
Teams to tiebreakers

Pool A	Skip	W	L	PF	PA	EW	EL	BE	SE	S%
Alberta	Chelsea Carey	7	0	57	36	33	25	10	7	82%
Ontario	Rachel Homan	5	2	52	31	28	25	12	8	83%
Northern Ontario	Krista McCarville	5	2	51	35	36	25	0	15	82%
British Columbia	Sarah Wark	4	3	52	43	33	32	3	7	78%
Manitoba	Tracy Fleury	4	3	50	35	34	25	8	14	81%
Nova Scotia	Jill Brothers	2	5	41	42	30	26	8	10	74%
Nunavut	Jenine Bodner	1	6	20	67	17	36	7	2	63%
Quebec	Gabrielle Lavoie	0	7	23	57	18	35	10	3	72%

Pool B	Skip	W	L	PF	PA	EW	EL	BE	SE	S%
(Alberta) Wildcard	Casey Scheidegger	6	1	51	29	32	23	8	13	81%
Saskatchewan	Robyn Silvernagle	5	2	44	36	28	21	10	8	80%
Prince Edward Island	Suzanne Birt	5	2	63	44	30	26	1	10	79%
Canada	Jennifer Jones	4	3	46	44	27	32	5	6	78%
Northwest Territories	Kerry Galusha	3	4	48	54	25	29	1	3	74%
New Brunswick	Andrea Crawford	3	4	55	51	29	28	4	7	78%
Newfoundland and Labrador	Kelli Sharpe	1	6	37	60	23	30	4	3	73%
Yukon	Nicole Baldwin	1	6	37	63	25	30	3	7	71%

== Round robin results ==
All draw times are listed in Atlantic Standard Time (UTC−04:00).

=== Draw 1 ===
Saturday, February 16, 14:30

Sheet A	1	2	3	4	5	6	7	8	9	10	Final
Nunavut (Bodner)	0	0	2	0	1	0	0	0	0	1	4
Quebec (Lavoie) 🔨	0	1	0	2	0	0	0	0	0	0	3

Sheet B	1	2	3	4	5	6	7	8	9	10	Final
British Columbia (Wark)	0	1	0	0	1	0	1	0	0	4	7
Nova Scotia (Brothers) 🔨	1	0	1	1	0	1	0	1	1	0	6

Sheet C	1	2	3	4	5	6	7	8	9	10	Final
Alberta (Carey)	0	0	0	3	0	2	0	0	1	1	7
Manitoba (Fleury) 🔨	0	2	1	0	2	0	0	1	0	0	6

Sheet D	1	2	3	4	5	6	7	8	9	10	Final
Northern Ontario (McCarville)	0	1	0	0	1	0	1	1	0	0	4
Ontario (Homan) 🔨	2	0	0	1	0	1	0	0	0	2	6

=== Draw 2 ===
Saturday, February 16, 19:30

Sheet A	1	2	3	4	5	6	7	8	9	10	Final
(Alberta) Wildcard (Scheidegger) 🔨	0	0	3	1	2	0	2	2	X	X	10
Yukon (Baldwin)	0	1	0	0	0	1	0	0	X	X	2

Sheet B	1	2	3	4	5	6	7	8	9	10	Final
Saskatchewan (Silvernagle) 🔨	1	0	0	1	0	1	0	2	0	0	5
Canada (Jones)	0	2	1	0	0	0	2	0	0	1	6

Sheet C	1	2	3	4	5	6	7	8	9	10	Final
Northwest Territories (Galusha)	0	2	0	3	0	1	0	5	X	X	11
New Brunswick (Crawford) 🔨	0	0	1	0	3	0	1	0	X	X	5

Sheet D	1	2	3	4	5	6	7	8	9	10	Final
Newfoundland and Labrador (Sharpe)	0	0	0	2	0	1	0	0	X	X	3
Prince Edward Island (Birt) 🔨	2	2	2	0	4	0	1	3	X	X	14

=== Draw 3 ===
Sunday, February 17, 09:30

Sheet A	1	2	3	4	5	6	7	8	9	10	Final
British Columbia (Wark)	0	1	0	0	3	1	0	0	2	X	7
Manitoba (Fleury) 🔨	1	0	1	1	0	0	1	1	0	X	5

Sheet B	1	2	3	4	5	6	7	8	9	10	Final
Nunavut (Bodner)	0	2	0	0	1	0	0	1	0	X	4
Ontario (Homan) 🔨	2	0	1	2	0	2	1	0	4	X	12

Sheet C	1	2	3	4	5	6	7	8	9	10	Final
Northern Ontario (McCarville) 🔨	1	1	1	2	0	0	2	1	X	X	8
Quebec (Lavoie)	0	0	0	0	1	1	0	0	X	X	2

Sheet D	1	2	3	4	5	6	7	8	9	10	Final
Alberta (Carey) 🔨	0	1	0	2	0	0	0	2	0	1	6
Nova Scotia (Brothers)	0	0	1	0	0	1	1	0	2	0	5

=== Draw 4 ===
Sunday, February 17, 14:30

Sheet A	1	2	3	4	5	6	7	8	9	10	Final
Saskatchewan (Silvernagle)	1	0	0	0	2	0	2	0	0	1	6
New Brunswick (Crawford) 🔨	0	0	0	1	0	2	0	1	0	0	4

Sheet B	1	2	3	4	5	6	7	8	9	10	Final
(Alberta) Wildcard (Scheidegger)	0	1	1	2	0	0	0	2	1	X	7
Prince Edward Island (Birt) 🔨	1	0	0	0	1	0	0	0	0	X	2

Sheet C	1	2	3	4	5	6	7	8	9	10	Final
Newfoundland and Labrador (Sharpe) 🔨	1	0	0	3	1	0	4	3	X	X	12
Yukon (Baldwin)	0	1	1	0	0	2	0	0	X	X	4

Sheet D	1	2	3	4	5	6	7	8	9	10	Final
Northwest Territories (Galusha)	0	0	1	0	1	0	0	2	0	X	4
Canada (Jones) 🔨	0	1	0	1	0	1	1	0	3	X	7

=== Draw 5 ===
Sunday, February 17, 20:00

Sheet A	1	2	3	4	5	6	7	8	9	10	Final
Northern Ontario (McCarville)	0	0	2	0	0	0	2	0	2	0	6
Alberta (Carey) 🔨	0	1	0	2	1	2	0	1	0	0	7

Sheet B	1	2	3	4	5	6	7	8	9	10	Final
Quebec (Lavoie)	0	1	0	0	1	0	1	0	0	0	3
Manitoba (Fleury) 🔨	2	0	1	1	0	0	0	1	1	1	7

Sheet C	1	2	3	4	5	6	7	8	9	10	Final
Ontario (Homan) 🔨	0	2	0	3	1	0	0	0	0	X	6
Nova Scotia (Brothers)	0	0	1	0	0	1	0	1	0	X	3

Sheet D	1	2	3	4	5	6	7	8	9	10	Final
Nunavut (Bodner) 🔨	0	1	0	0	0	0	0	0	X	X	1
British Columbia (Wark)	1	0	0	3	1	1	2	2	X	X	10

=== Draw 6 ===
Monday, February 18, 09:30

Sheet A	1	2	3	4	5	6	7	8	9	10	Final
Newfoundland and Labrador (Sharpe)	0	0	1	1	0	0	2	0	0	X	4
Northwest Territories (Galusha) 🔨	2	1	0	0	2	0	0	0	3	X	8

Sheet B	1	2	3	4	5	6	7	8	9	10	Final
Yukon (Baldwin)	0	1	1	0	0	1	0	0	X	X	3
New Brunswick (Crawford) 🔨	2	0	0	1	1	0	4	4	X	X	12

Sheet C	1	2	3	4	5	6	7	8	9	10	Final
Prince Edward Island (Birt) 🔨	0	2	2	2	0	1	0	0	0	1	8
Canada (Jones)	2	0	0	0	1	0	1	2	0	0	6

Sheet D	1	2	3	4	5	6	7	8	9	10	Final
(Alberta) Wildcard (Scheidegger)	0	0	0	0	2	0	0	2	2	0	6
Saskatchewan (Silvernagle) 🔨	0	1	1	0	0	2	2	0	0	2	8

=== Draw 7 ===
Monday, February 18, 14:30

Sheet A	1	2	3	4	5	6	7	8	9	10	Final
Manitoba (Fleury) 🔨	0	2	0	2	0	2	0	1	2	X	9
Nova Scotia (Brothers)	0	0	1	0	2	0	1	0	0	X	4

Sheet B	1	2	3	4	5	6	7	8	9	10	Final
Northern Ontario (McCarville)	1	1	1	0	2	0	4	0	X	X	9
Nunavut (Bodner) 🔨	0	0	0	1	0	1	0	1	X	X	3

Sheet C	1	2	3	4	5	6	7	8	9	10	11	Final
British Columbia (Wark)	0	2	0	1	0	1	0	2	0	2	0	8
Alberta (Carey) 🔨	2	0	2	0	1	0	1	0	2	0	1	9

Sheet D	1	2	3	4	5	6	7	8	9	10	Final
Ontario (Homan) 🔨	2	4	0	1	0	0	2	3	X	X	12
Quebec (Lavoie)	0	0	1	0	1	0	0	0	X	X	2

=== Draw 8 ===
Monday, February 18, 19:30

Sheet A	1	2	3	4	5	6	7	8	9	10	Final
New Brunswick (Crawford)	0	0	2	1	0	3	0	2	0	1	9
Canada (Jones) 🔨	0	1	0	0	1	0	1	0	3	0	6

Sheet B	1	2	3	4	5	6	7	8	9	10	Final
Newfoundland and Labrador (Sharpe) 🔨	1	0	0	2	0	0	1	0	1	X	5
(Alberta) Wildcard (Scheidegger)	0	3	1	0	1	0	0	3	0	X	8

Sheet C	1	2	3	4	5	6	7	8	9	10	Final
Saskatchewan (Silvernagle) 🔨	0	1	0	2	0	0	0	1	0	X	4
Northwest Territories (Galusha)	0	0	1	0	3	0	2	0	3	X	9

Sheet D	1	2	3	4	5	6	7	8	9	10	Final
Prince Edward Island (Birt)	0	0	1	0	3	2	1	0	1	X	8
Yukon (Baldwin) 🔨	0	2	0	1	0	0	0	1	0	X	4

=== Draw 9 ===
Tuesday, February 19, 09:30

Sheet A	1	2	3	4	5	6	7	8	9	10	Final
Alberta (Carey) 🔨	2	0	4	0	0	1	0	1	2	X	10
Nunavut (Bodner)	0	1	0	2	1	0	1	0	0	X	5

Sheet B	1	2	3	4	5	6	7	8	9	10	Final
Nova Scotia (Brothers) 🔨	2	0	0	1	0	0	2	1	1	X	7
Quebec (Lavoie)	0	1	1	0	0	2	0	0	0	X	4

Sheet C	1	2	3	4	5	6	7	8	9	10	Final
Manitoba (Fleury) 🔨	1	0	0	2	0	1	0	1	1	0	6
Ontario (Homan)	0	3	1	0	0	0	0	0	0	1	5

Sheet D	1	2	3	4	5	6	7	8	9	10	11	Final
British Columbia (Wark) 🔨	1	0	1	0	3	0	1	0	0	1	0	7
Northern Ontario (McCarville)	0	1	0	1	0	1	0	2	2	0	1	8

=== Draw 10 ===
Tuesday, February 19, 14:30

Sheet A	1	2	3	4	5	6	7	8	9	10	Final
Northwest Territories (Galusha)	0	0	1	0	0	1	0	2	0	1	5
(Alberta) Wildcard (Scheidegger) 🔨	0	1	0	0	1	0	3	0	1	0	6

Sheet B	1	2	3	4	5	6	7	8	9	10	Final
Canada (Jones) 🔨	5	0	2	0	0	0	2	0	0	X	9
Yukon (Baldwin)	0	1	0	2	1	1	0	2	0	X	7

Sheet C	1	2	3	4	5	6	7	8	9	10	11	Final
New Brunswick (Crawford) 🔨	0	0	2	2	0	2	0	3	0	3	0	12
Prince Edward Island (Birt)	0	5	0	0	3	0	2	0	2	0	1	13

^ This match set a record for the highest scoring game in Canadian national women's championship history.

Sheet D	1	2	3	4	5	6	7	8	9	10	Final
Saskatchewan (Silvernagle)	0	0	4	1	0	0	2	0	1	X	8
Newfoundland and Labrador (Sharpe) 🔨	0	0	0	0	2	0	0	2	0	X	4

=== Draw 11 ===
Tuesday, February 19, 19:30

Sheet A	1	2	3	4	5	6	7	8	9	10	Final
Nova Scotia (Brothers)	0	1	0	0	0	3	0	0	1	X	5
Northern Ontario (McCarville) 🔨	2	0	2	1	1	0	1	2	0	X	9

Sheet B	1	2	3	4	5	6	7	8	9	10	Final
Ontario (Homan)	0	0	1	0	0	0	1	1	0	0	3
Alberta (Carey) 🔨	0	2	0	0	0	3	0	0	0	1	6

Sheet C	1	2	3	4	5	6	7	8	9	10	Final
Quebec (Lavoie) 🔨	0	0	1	0	1	0	2	0	2	0	6
British Columbia (Wark)	0	0	0	2	0	1	0	3	0	1	7

Sheet D	1	2	3	4	5	6	7	8	9	10	Final
Manitoba (Fleury)	1	0	3	1	2	0	3	2	X	X	12
Nunavut (Bodner) 🔨	0	1	0	0	0	1	0	0	X	X	2

=== Draw 12 ===
Wednesday, February 20, 09:30

Sheet A	1	2	3	4	5	6	7	8	9	10	Final
Canada (Jones)	0	1	0	4	1	0	2	0	X	X	8
Newfoundland and Labrador (Sharpe) 🔨	1	0	1	0	0	1	0	1	X	X	4

Sheet B	1	2	3	4	5	6	7	8	9	10	Final
Prince Edward Island (Birt)	0	2	2	0	2	0	3	6	X	X	15
Northwest Territories (Galusha) 🔨	2	0	0	1	0	2	0	0	X	X	5

Sheet C	1	2	3	4	5	6	7	8	9	10	Final
Yukon (Baldwin) 🔨	0	0	0	1	0	2	0	0	1	0	4
Saskatchewan (Silvernagle)	0	1	0	0	2	0	0	2	0	1	6

Sheet D	1	2	3	4	5	6	7	8	9	10	Final
New Brunswick (Crawford)	0	0	0	1	1	0	0	1	0	X	3
(Alberta) Wildcard (Scheidegger) 🔨	0	1	1	0	0	1	3	0	1	X	7

=== Draw 13 ===
Wednesday, February 20, 14:30

Sheet A	1	2	3	4	5	6	7	8	9	10	Final
Ontario (Homan)	0	4	1	0	2	0	0	1	0	X	8
British Columbia (Wark) 🔨	1	0	0	1	0	1	1	0	2	X	6

Sheet B	1	2	3	4	5	6	7	8	9	10	11	Final
Manitoba (Fleury) 🔨	0	2	0	0	0	0	0	2	0	1	0	5
Northern Ontario (McCarville)	0	0	1	0	1	1	1	0	1	0	2	7

Sheet C	1	2	3	4	5	6	7	8	9	10	Final
Nova Scotia (Brothers) 🔨	1	1	1	3	1	0	4	0	X	X	11
Nunavut (Bodner)	0	0	0	0	0	1	0	0	X	X	1

Sheet D	1	2	3	4	5	6	7	8	9	10	Final
Quebec (Lavoie)	0	0	0	1	0	2	0	0	X	X	3
Alberta (Carey) 🔨	2	1	4	0	1	0	2	2	X	X	12

=== Draw 14 ===
Wednesday, February 20, 19:30

Sheet A	1	2	3	4	5	6	7	8	9	10	Final
Prince Edward Island (Birt)	0	0	0	1	0	0	2	0	0	0	3
Saskatchewan (Silvernagle) 🔨	0	0	2	0	0	2	0	0	1	2	7

Sheet B	1	2	3	4	5	6	7	8	9	10	Final
New Brunswick (Crawford)	0	2	0	1	2	1	0	4	X	X	10
Newfoundland and Labrador (Sharpe) 🔨	2	0	2	0	0	0	1	0	X	X	5

Sheet C	1	2	3	4	5	6	7	8	9	10	Final
Canada (Jones)	0	0	0	0	1	1	0	0	2	0	4
(Alberta) Wildcard (Scheidegger) 🔨	0	1	1	1	0	0	2	1	0	1	7

Sheet D	1	2	3	4	5	6	7	8	9	10	Final
Northwest Territories (Galusha)	0	0	2	0	1	0	3	0	0	X	6
Yukon (Baldwin) 🔨	1	4	0	2	0	4	0	1	1	X	13

=== Tiebreaker ===
Thursday, February 21, 09:30

Sheet C	1	2	3	4	5	6	7	8	9	10	Final
British Columbia (Wark)	0	3	0	0	1	0	1	3	0	X	8
Manitoba (Fleury) 🔨	0	0	0	1	0	2	0	0	2	X	5

== Championship pool standings ==
The top four teams from each pool advanced to the Championship pool. All wins and losses earned in the round robin (including results against teams that failed to advance) were carried forward into the Championship Pool. Wins in tiebreaker games were not carried forward.

Final Championship pool standings

Key
Teams to playoffs

Team	Skip	W	L	PF	PA	EW	EL	BE	SE	S%
Alberta	Chelsea Carey	9	2	90	67	53	41	9	13	81%
Saskatchewan	Robyn Silvernagle	8	3	72	60	44	35	14	13	81%
Ontario	Rachel Homan	8	3	80	51	44	38	15	12	84%
Northern Ontario	Krista McCarville	8	3	78	63	53	42	1	21	84%
(Alberta) Wildcard	Casey Scheidegger	7	4	77	60	45	43	11	14	80%
Prince Edward Island	Suzanne Birt	6	5	93	73	49	44	3	14	80%
Canada	Jennifer Jones	6	5	73	73	43	51	8	9	80%
British Columbia	Sarah Wark	5	6	77	75	51	50	1	13	80%

== Championship pool results ==
All draw times are listed in Atlantic Standard Time (UTC−4:00).

=== Draw 15 ===
Thursday, February 21, 14:30

Sheet A	1	2	3	4	5	6	7	8	9	10	Final
British Columbia (Wark) 🔨	2	0	2	0	0	2	0	0	2	1	9
Prince Edward Island (Birt)	0	3	0	1	1	0	2	1	0	0	8

Sheet B	1	2	3	4	5	6	7	8	9	10	Final
(Alberta) Wildcard (Scheidegger) 🔨	0	0	0	2	0	0	0	0	X	X	2
Ontario (Homan)	1	1	2	0	0	4	0	1	X	X	9

Sheet C	1	2	3	4	5	6	7	8	9	10	Final
Alberta (Carey) 🔨	1	2	0	1	0	2	0	0	2	0	8
Canada (Jones)	0	0	2	0	2	0	3	2	0	1	10

Sheet D	1	2	3	4	5	6	7	8	9	10	Final
Saskatchewan (Silvernagle) 🔨	0	2	0	2	1	0	3	0	3	X	11
Northern Ontario (McCarville)	0	0	2	0	0	1	0	2	0	X	5

=== Draw 16 ===
Thursday, February 21, 19:30

Sheet A	1	2	3	4	5	6	7	8	9	10	Final
Northern Ontario (McCarville)	0	0	1	3	2	0	0	0	1	0	7
(Alberta) Wildcard (Scheidegger) 🔨	0	2	0	0	0	1	0	1	0	1	5

Sheet B	1	2	3	4	5	6	7	8	9	10	Final
Prince Edward Island (Birt) 🔨	0	0	2	0	4	0	1	2	0	1	10
Alberta (Carey)	1	0	0	1	0	2	0	0	2	0	6

Sheet C	1	2	3	4	5	6	7	8	9	10	Final
Saskatchewan (Silvernagle)	0	0	1	2	1	0	0	3	0	1	8
British Columbia (Wark) 🔨	1	1	0	0	0	3	0	0	1	0	6

Sheet D	1	2	3	4	5	6	7	8	9	10	Final
Ontario (Homan) 🔨	0	3	0	2	0	1	0	0	0	3	9
Canada (Jones)	0	0	1	0	3	0	1	0	1	0	6

=== Draw 17 ===
Friday, February 22, 14:30

Sheet A	1	2	3	4	5	6	7	8	9	10	Final
Alberta (Carey) 🔨	0	0	3	1	0	1	0	2	3	X	10
Saskatchewan (Silvernagle)	0	0	0	0	2	0	1	0	0	X	3

Sheet B	1	2	3	4	5	6	7	8	9	10	Final
Canada (Jones) 🔨	0	1	0	0	0	3	0	2	0	0	6
Northern Ontario (McCarville)	0	0	1	1	1	0	2	0	2	1	8

Sheet C	1	2	3	4	5	6	7	8	9	10	11	Final
Prince Edward Island (Birt)	0	0	3	0	0	1	0	1	0	1	0	6
Ontario (Homan) 🔨	0	1	0	0	3	0	1	0	1	0	1	7

Sheet D	1	2	3	4	5	6	7	8	9	10	Final
(Alberta) Wildcard (Scheidegger)	0	3	0	0	3	0	1	0	4	X	11
British Columbia (Wark) 🔨	1	0	1	1	0	2	0	1	0	X	6

=== Draw 18 ===
Friday, February 22, 19:30

Sheet A	1	2	3	4	5	6	7	8	9	10	Final
Canada (Jones) (Note: With Team Canada's victory, Jennifer Jones became the winningest skip at the Canadian national women's championship (141 victories), surpassing Colleen Jones.) 🔨	1	0	1	0	0	2	1	0	0	0	5
British Columbia (Wark)	0	1	0	1	1	0	0	1	0	0	4

Sheet B	1	2	3	4	5	6	7	8	9	10	Final
Ontario (Homan) 🔨	0	1	0	0	0	0	0	2	0	0	3
Saskatchewan (Silvernagle)	0	0	0	2	0	2	1	0	0	1	6

Sheet C	1	2	3	4	5	6	7	8	9	10	11	Final
(Alberta) Wildcard (Scheidegger) 🔨	0	3	0	2	0	0	2	0	0	1	0	8
Alberta (Carey)	2	0	1	0	1	1	0	3	0	0	1	9

Sheet D	1	2	3	4	5	6	7	8	9	10	Final
Northern Ontario (McCarville)	0	0	1	0	2	2	0	0	2	0	7
Prince Edward Island (Birt) 🔨	1	1	0	2	0	0	0	1	0	1	6

== Playoffs ==
Page playoff system
1	Alberta	11
2	Saskatchewan	7
3	Ontario	6
4	Northern Ontario	4

Semifinal
2	Saskatchewan	7
3	Ontario	9

Final
1	Alberta	8
3	Ontario	6

=== 1 vs. 2 ===
Saturday, February 23, 19:30

Sheet C	1	2	3	4	5	6	7	8	9	10	Final
Alberta (Carey) 🔨	2	0	0	1	1	0	4	0	1	2	11
Saskatchewan (Silvernagle)	0	3	1	0	0	1	0	2	0	0	7

Player percentages
Alberta		Saskatchewan	
Rachelle Brown	94%	Kara Thevenot	71%
Dana Ferguson	91%	Jessie Hunkin	83%
Sarah Wilkes	83%	Stefanie Lawton	66%
Chelsea Carey	64%	Robyn Silvernagle	70%
Total	83%	Total	73%

=== 3 vs. 4 ===
Saturday, February 23, 14:30

Sheet C	1	2	3	4	5	6	7	8	9	10	Final
Ontario (Homan) 🔨	2	0	1	0	1	0	0	1	0	1	6
Northern Ontario (McCarville)	0	1	0	1	0	1	0	0	1	0	4

Player percentages
Ontario		Northern Ontario	
Lisa Weagle	86%	Sarah Potts	96%
Joanne Courtney	75%	Jen Gates	71%
Emma Miskew	80%	Kendra Lilly	64%
Rachel Homan	88%	Krista McCarville	63%
Total	82%	Total	73%

=== Semifinal ===
Sunday, February 24, 12:00

Sheet C	1	2	3	4	5	6	7	8	9	10	Final
Saskatchewan (Silvernagle) 🔨	0	1	0	1	0	0	3	0	2	0	7
Ontario (Homan)	0	0	2	0	0	4	0	2	0	1	9

Player percentages
Saskatchewan		Ontario	
Kara Thevenot	91%	Lisa Weagle	91%
Jessie Hunkin	76%	Joanne Courtney	86%
Stefanie Lawton	76%	Emma Miskew	90%
Robyn Silvernagle	68%	Rachel Homan	86%
Total	77%	Total	88%

=== Final ===
Sunday, February 24, 18:00

Sheet C	1	2	3	4	5	6	7	8	9	10	11	Final
Alberta (Carey) 🔨	0	0	1	0	1	1	1	0	1	1	2	8
Ontario (Homan)	1	1	0	3	0	0	0	1	0	0	0	6

Player percentages
Alberta		Ontario	
Rachelle Brown	86%	Lisa Weagle	85%
Dana Ferguson	86%	Joanne Courtney	90%
Sarah Wilkes	64%	Emma Miskew	76%
Chelsea Carey	65%	Rachel Homan	75%
Total	75%	Total	82%

== Statistics ==
=== Top 5 player percentages ===
Final Round Robin Percentages; minimum 6 games

Key
First All-Star Team
Second All-Star Team

Leads	%
(Canada) Dawn McEwen	89
(Northern Ontario) Sarah Potts	87
(Prince Edward Island) Michelle McQuaid	85
(British Columbia) Jen Rusnell	85
(Ontario) Lisa Weagle	85

Seconds	%
(Northern Ontario) Jen Gates	83
(Ontario) Joanne Courtney	83
(Manitoba) Liz Fyfe	83
WC Jessie Haughian	83
(Alberta) Dana Ferguson	82
(British Columbia) Carley Sandwith	82

Thirds	%
(Ontario) Emma Miskew	84
(Northern Ontario) Kendra Lilly	82
(Alberta) Sarah Wilkes	82
(Manitoba) Selena Njegovan	82
(Saskatchewan) Stefanie Lawton	82

Skips	%
(Ontario) Rachel Homan	84
(Northern Ontario) Krista McCarville	82
(Alberta) Chelsea Carey	81
(Saskatchewan) Robyn Silvernagle	80
(British Columbia) Sarah Wark	78

== Awards ==
The awards and all-star teams were as follows:

All-Star Teams

First Team

- Skip: Rachel Homan, Ontario
- Third: Emma Miskew, Ontario
- Second: Jen Gates, Northern Ontario
- Lead: Dawn McEwen, Team Canada

Second Team

- Skip: Krista McCarville, Northern Ontario
- Third: Kendra Lilly, Northern Ontario
- Second: Joanne Courtney, Ontario
- Lead: Sarah Potts, Northern Ontario

Marj Mitchell Sportsmanship Award

- Sarah Potts, Northern Ontario

Joan Mead Builder Award

- Leslie Ann Walsh, for her contributions to grow the sport of curling in her home province of Newfoundland and Labrador, and grow the sport of wheelchair curling.

Paul McLean Award

- Andrew Klaver, photojournalist

== Provincial and territorial playdowns ==
- 2019 Alberta Scotties Tournament of Hearts
- 2019 British Columbia Scotties Tournament of Hearts
- 2019 Manitoba Scotties Tournament of Hearts
- 2019 New Brunswick Scotties Tournament of Hearts
- 2019 Newfoundland and Labrador Scotties Tournament of Hearts
- 2019 Northern Ontario Scotties Tournament of Hearts
- 2019 Nova Scotia Scotties Tournament of Hearts
- 2019 Ontario Scotties Tournament of Hearts
- 2019 Prince Edward Island Scotties Tournament of Hearts
- 2019 Quebec Scotties Tournament of Hearts
- 2019 Saskatchewan Scotties Tournament of Hearts
- 2019 Northwest Territories Scotties Tournament of Hearts
- 2019 Yukon Scotties Tournament of Hearts
- 2019 Nunavut Scotties Tournament of Hearts
