= Emma Logan =

Canadian curler

- Curler
- Born: August 11, 1997 (age 29); Halifax, Nova Scotia, Canada

Team
- Curling club: Highlander CC, Halifax, NS

Curling career
- Member Association: Nova Scotia
- Hearts: 2 (2020, 2021)
- Top CTRS ranking: 26th (2019–20)

Emma Logan (born August 11, 1997) is a Canadian curler from Halifax, Nova Scotia. She is the niece of five time Scotties champion Mary-Anne Arsenault. She is also deaf.

== Career ==
Logan skipped the St. Francis Xavier University team at the 2017 U Sports/Curling Canada University Championships in Thunder Bay, Ontario where the team went 3–4.

She joined her aunt Mary-Anne Arsenault's team as alternate for the 2018–19 season. They lost the final of the 2019 Nova Scotia Scotties Tournament of Hearts to Jill Brothers 6–5. The following season, Kristin Clarke left the team and Logan moved up to lead.

Team Arsenault won The Curling Store Cashspiel on the World Curling Tour, going undefeated through the tournament. They also played in the Tour Challenge Tier 2 Grand Slam event where they went 2–2. At the 2020 Nova Scotia Scotties Tournament of Hearts, the team was successful in capturing the provincial title when they defeated Colleen Jones in the final. With the win, Logan became the first deaf person to compete at the Scotties Tournament of Hearts. At the 2020 Scotties Tournament of Hearts, Nova Scotia went 4–3 through the round robin, qualifying for the tiebreaker against British Columbia's Corryn Brown. In the tiebreaker, Nova Scotia lost 5–4 and were eliminated from contention. After the season, Mary-Anne Arsenault moved to British Columbia and Logan joined the Jill Brothers rink as their alternate.

Due to the COVID-19 pandemic in Nova Scotia, the 2021 Nova Scotia Scotties Tournament of Hearts was cancelled. Since the reigning champions, Team Mary-Anne Arsenault, did not retain three out of four team members still playing together, Team Brothers (the top-ranked Nova Scotia team on the points list for the 2020–21 season) was invited to represent Nova Scotia at the 2021 Scotties Tournament of Hearts, which they accepted. One member of Team Brothers, Sarah Murphy opted not to attend the Scotties, with lead Jenn Brine moving up to second and Logan moving up to play lead. At the Tournament of Hearts, the team finished with a 3–5 record, failing to make it to the championship round.

== Personal life ==
Logan is currently a customer success manager for LifeRaft.

== Teams ==
Season	Skip	Third	Second	Lead	Alternate
2014–15	Ashley Francis	Emma Logan	Rachel Crouse	Sarah Sinclair	
2015–16	Ashley Francis	Emma Logan	Rachel Crouse	Sarah Sinclair	
2018–19	Mary-Anne Arsenault	Christina Black	Jenn Baxter	Kristin Clarke	Emma Logan
2019–20	Mary-Anne Arsenault	Christina Black	Jenn Baxter	Emma Logan	Kristin Clarke
2020–21	Jill Brothers	Erin Carmody	Sarah Murphy	Jenn Brine	Emma Logan
2021–22	Jessica Daigle	Kristin Clarke	Lindsey Burgess	Emma Logan	
2022–23	Jessica Daigle	Kirsten Lind	Lindsey Burgess	Emma Logan	
