= Jill Brothers =

Canadian curler

- Curler
- Born: Jillian Mouzar; May 20, 1983 (age 43); Liverpool, Nova Scotia, Canada

Team
- Curling club: Halifax CC, Halifax, NS
- Skip: Christina Black
- Third: Jill Brothers
- Second: Marlee Powers
- Lead: Lindsey Burgess
- Alternate: Karlee Everist

Curling career
- Member Association: Nova Scotia (2004–2011; 2013–2022; 2023–present); Ontario (2010–13); New Brunswick (2022–2023)
- Hearts: 9 (2007, 2014, 2016, 2019, 2021, 2023, 2024, 2025, 2026)
- Top CTRS ranking: 4th (2024–25)
Medal record
Representing Canada
World Junior Championships
Silver medal – second place	2004 Trois-Rivières
Representing Nova Scotia
Canadian Olympic Curling Trials
Silver medal – second place	2025 Halifax
Scotties Tournament of Hearts
Bronze medal – third place	2025 Thunder Bay
Canadian Mixed Curling Championship
Gold medal – first place	2010 Burlington

Jillian Brothers (born May 20, 1983 as Jillian Mouzar [pronounced "MOW-zer"]) is a Canadian curler. She currently plays third on Team Christina Black. Brothers was born in Liverpool, Nova Scotia and now resides in Bedford, Nova Scotia.

== Career ==
=== Juniors ===
Brothers started curling in Liverpool, Nova Scotia. Her first Nova Scotia junior championship was in 2001, skipping a team with Meaghan Smart, Meghan MacAdams, Carolyn Marshall and coach Albert Smart. This was the first Liverpool team to curl at the national level since 1970, representing Nova Scotia at the 2001 Canadian Junior Curling Championships. Unfortunately, they finished that tournament in last place with a 1-11 record.

In 2004, Brothers skipped a Nova Scotia team with Paige Mattie, Blisse Comstock, Chloe Comstock and coach Donalda Mattie. They won the Canadian Junior Women's championship after finishing the round-robin with a 9-3 record and defeated Québec’s Julie Cantin in the final 6-3. That earned them the right to represent Canada in the 2004 World Junior Curling Championships in Trois-Rivières, Québec. They finished that tournament in first place with a 9-0 round-robin record but lost to Norway’s Linn Githmark 9-6 in the gold medal game, claiming the silver.

=== Women's ===
In 2005 Brothers' women's team finished fourth out of eight teams at the Nova Scotia women's championships in its first year of eligibility.

Brothers won her first provincial women's championship in 2007 and represented Nova Scotia at the Scotties Tournament of Hearts in Lethbridge, Alberta with teammates Meredith Harrison, Teri Lake, and Hayley Clarke. They finished with a 3-8 record.

In 2010, Brothers moved to Ontario and began playing for Kirsten Wall as the team's lead. In 2012, the team broke up, and Wall left the rink, and Brothers was promoted from lead to skip. Brothers qualified for her first Ontario provincial in 2013. Following the season, Brothers moved back to Nova Scotia to play third for Heather Smith, for whom she played two seasons. The team won the 2014 Nova Scotia Scotties Tournament of Hearts, and represented Nova Scotia at the 2014 Scotties Tournament of Hearts. There, Smith led the team to a 4-7 record. Smith left the team in 2015, and Brothers took over as skip. Brothers won the 2016 Nova Scotia Scotties Tournament of Hearts, and led Nova Scotia to a 6-5 record at the 2016 Scotties Tournament of Hearts. Brothers would not win another provincial until 2019. She led her Nova Scotia team on home ice at the 2019 Scotties Tournament of Hearts, but were eliminated after pool play, finishing with a 2-5 record.

The 2021 Nova Scotia Scotties was cancelled due to the COVID-19 pandemic in Nova Scotia, so the Nova Scotia Curling Association appointed Brothers and her team to represent the province at the 2021 Scotties Tournament of Hearts, as the 2020 provincial champion Mary-Anne Arsenault moved to British Columbia. One member of the Brothers rink, Sarah Murphy, opted not to attend the Scotties, with lead Jenn Brine moving up to second and alternate Emma Logan moving up to play lead. At the Tournament of Hearts, Brothers led team Nova Scotia to a 3–5 record, failing to make it to the championship round.

In the 2021-22 season, Team Brothers competed with Jenn Mitchell at lead, Sarah Murphy at second, Erin Carmody at third and Kim Kelly as the alternate. They were invited to the 2021 Canadian Olympic Curling Pre-Trials in her hometown of Liverpool, NS, as a result of their second-place finish at the 2021 Canadian Curling Pre-Trials Direct-Entry Event in Ottawa. They finished the round-robin in last place in Pool B with a 1-5 record. Their last major event was the 2022 Nova Scotia Scotties Tournament of Hearts in Berwick, NS. They were not able to defeat Christina Black, whose team won all three qualifying events against them to claim the title, and would break up at the end of the season.

For the 2022-23 season, Brothers joined Andrea Kelly’s New Brunswick rink at second alongside teammates Katie Vandenborre at lead and Sylvie Quillian at third. Major events that they competed in included the 2022 PointsBet Invitational, where they were eliminated by Jennifer Jones in their lone game, and the 2022 HearingLife Tour Challenge Tier 2 event, which they qualified for as the host team, and went 3-1 before losing in the quarterfinal. They were the winners of the 2023 New Brunswick Scotties Tournament of Hearts, going undefeated in the tournament, but did not fare as well in the 2023 Scotties Tournament of Hearts, going 3-5 in pool play. For 2023-24, she would reunite with Carmody on a Nova Scotia rink skipped by Marie Christianson, along with teammates Heather Smith and Taylour Stevens. Smith took over as skip later in the season but threw third stones while Brothers threw fourth. They competed in several minor events but only two major ones: the 2024 Nova Scotia Scotties Tournament of Hearts, where they went 4-1 in the qualifying round and defeated Black’s team in the final 5-4, and the 2024 Scotties Tournament of Hearts, where they went 3-5 in pool play, missing the playoffs. Team Christianson/Smith would disband at the end of the season.

At the beginning of the 2024-25 curling season, Black's team announced that Brothers would be joining them as third, alongside Jenn Baxter and Karlee Everist.The team had success in their first season together, winning the Tier 2 event of the 2024 Tour Challenge, qualifying them for the 2024 National Grand Slam, where they lost in the Quarterfinals to Anna Hasselborg. Black would also go on to win the 2025 NS Women's Championship, beating clubmate Mackenzie Mitchell in the final, qualifying the team to represent Nova Scotia at the 2025 Scotties Tournament of Hearts. At the 2025 Scotties, the Black rink finished 2nd in Pool B with a 6–2 record, and would make it to the semifinals, where they lost to Kerri Einarson 9–8 after a measurement in the 10th end, winning a bronze medal for Nova Scotia.

Team Black finished the 2024–25 season at number four in the Canadian Team Ranking System rankings, which earned them a pre-qualifier berth in the Scotties Tournament of Hearts, and they also prequalified for the 2025 Canadian Olympic Curling Trials based on cumulative CTRS points from 2023 to 2025. As a result, they were able to primarily focus their efforts in 2025-26 on travelling to Tier 1 and Tier 2 events outside Nova Scotia, where they could play against tougher competition and gain valuable experience. Their first major event was the 2025 AMJ Masters in London, ON, where they went 2–2 in the round-robin, missing the quarterfinals by a point. Next up for them was the 2025 PointsBet Invitational in Calgary; the seven teams that had prequalified for the Olympic Trials were automatically invited; they went 1–3 in this event, again missing the playoffs. A couple of weeks later, they flew back to Alberta for the CO-OP Tour Challenge in Nisku and fared even worse with an 0–4 record. In November, Team Black participated in the 2025 Canadian Olympic Curling Trials in their hometown of Halifax, where they would finish round-robin play in 3rd place with a 4–3 record. They would go on to beat Kerri Einarson 6–3 in the semifinals but would ultimately lose both games to Rachel Homan in the best-of-three final by 5-4 and 12-3 scores, claiming the silver medal. They went on the road one more time before the end of 2025, appearing at the 2025 HearingLife Canadian Open Tier 2 Division in Martensville, SK, which they qualified for based on their World Curling team ranking (#15). Their record at the Open was 2-2; they qualified for the quarterfinals, where they beat Isabella Wranå 7-1 and then fell to Kaitlyn Lawes in the semifinal 8–3. The last event on Team Black's calendar for the 2025–26 season was the 2026 Scotties Tournament of Hearts in Mississauga, ON. They finished second in Pool B with a 6–2 record, but struggled in the playoffs, losing to Manitoba's Lawes in the 1/2 qualifier game 8–6, defeating fellow Nova Scotian Taylour Stevens 11–6 in the 3/4 qualifier game, then falling in the Page 3/4 game to Alberta's Selena Sturmay 8–4. Team Black participated in some smaller events earlier in the season as well, making the semifinals at the Asham Ice Breaker Challenge in Morris, MB after finishing pool play with a 3–1 record, missing the playoffs at the 2025 AMJ Campbell Shorty Jenkins Classic in Cornwall, ON after a 2-3 round-robin, and won the 2025 Stu Sells 1824 Halifax Classic, finishing 4–1 in the round-robin and defeating Danielle Inglis in the final 6–5. On March 16, 2026, Team Black announced that Baxter will be leaving the team and stepping away from competitive curling to focus on other important parts of her life and to spend more time with her family. The remaining members of the team were planning to continue together for the 2026-27 season, but on April 17, 2026, Everist announced that she is expecting her second child in October and that her role with the team would be changing as a result. The next day, Team Black announced that Lindsey Burgess, who had been living in Alberta and playing second for Serena Gray-Withers, would be returning to Nova Scotia, where she grew up and went to school, to take over the lead position in the 2026-27 season while Everist steps back into the alternate role. Black said that giving Burgess the lead role "will help us have a consistent lineup for the whole season, not having to change halfway through. It’s the best route to take for our year."

=== Mixed ===
Brothers played lead for Nova Scotia on a team skipped by Mark Dacey at the 2010 Canadian Mixed Curling Championship in Burlington, ON. They finished the round-robin with a 9-2 record and proceeded directly to the final, where they defeated Mark Bice’s Ontario rink 7-5 to win the gold medal. Brothers was named the Canadian Mixed All-Star at lead.

== Personal life ==
Brothers is employed as technical director with the Nova Scotia Curling Association. She has two children and is married to broadcaster Paul Brothers.

== Grand Slam record ==
Key
C	Champion
F	Lost in Final
SF	Lost in Semifinal
QF	Lost in Quarterfinals
R16	Lost in the round of 16
Q	Did not advance to playoffs
T2	Played in Tier 2 event
DNP	Did not participate in event
N/A	Not a Grand Slam event that season

Event	2024–25	2025–26	2026–27
Invitational	T2	Q	DNP
Masters	DNP	Q	DNP
National	QF	DNP	Q
Open	DNP	T2	DNP

=== Former events ===
Event	2007–08	2008–09	2009–10	2010–11
Autumn Gold	DNP	Q	Q	DNP
Wayden Transportation	Q	DNP	N/A	N/A
Sobeys Slam	QF	Q	N/A	Q
