= Erin Carmody =

Canadian curler (born 1988)

- Curler
- Born: August 4, 1988 (age 38); Charlottetown, Prince Edward Island

Team
- Curling club: Halifax CC; Halifax, NS
- Skip: Andrea Kelly
- Third: Jennifer Fenwick
- Second: Erin Carmody
- Lead: Katie Vandenborre

Curling career
- Member Association: Prince Edward Island (2003–2011); Alberta (2011–2016); Nova Scotia (2016–2024); New Brunswick (2025–present)
- Hearts: 4 (2010, 2019, 2021, 2024)
- Top CTRS ranking: 7th (2011–12)
Medal record
Women's curling
Representing Prince Edward Island
Scotties Tournament of Hearts
Silver medal – second place	2010 Sault Ste. Marie

Erin Carmody (born August 4, 1988) is a Canadian curler, from Charlottetown, Prince Edward Island but residing in Halifax, Nova Scotia. She currently plays second on Team Andrea Kelly. A native of the city of Summerside, Carmody was a biology student at the University of Prince Edward Island when she broke onto the curling scene by winning three consecutive provincial junior championships, twice with an undefeated record. She entered the national scene in 2010 after forming a rink with longtime teammate Geri-Lynn Ramsay and veteran curlers Kathy O'Rourke and Tricia Affleck that captured the 2010 provincial championships at the women's level, and when they went to the 2010 Scotties Tournament of Hearts, the squad made it all the way to the final but lost in the last match to three-time tournament champion Jennifer Jones. After the event, Carmody was presented with the Sandra Schmirler Most Valuable Player Award.

== Career ==
=== Juniors ===
==== 2003–2007 ====
One of Carmody's earliest curling victories came in 2003, while skipping out of the Silver Fox Curling and Yacht Club, when she won the Prince Edward Island provincial 15 and under championship alongside Geri-Lynn Ramsay, Candace Cameron, and Courtney Champion. Later that year she and Ramsay were members of the Vanessa Aylward rink that won the junior women's Eastern Canadian Junior Cashspiel. The following year, with Ramsay and new additions Anita Casey and Danielle Chaisson, Carmody's rink captured the provincial 17 and under championships, a feat that Carmody and Ramsay repeated as members of the Danielle Sharkey rink in 2005. In the latter tournament Carmody threw fourth stones. The following month the squad captured the Atlantic 17 and Under Curling Championship, and later in the year finished in second place in the Under 20 division of the Maritime Junior Cashpiel and won the 3rd annual Bathurst Curling Club Junior Cashspiel with an undefeated record. The following year they were runners-up in both the provincial 20 and Under and 17 and Under championships.

==== 2007–2009 ====
Carmody made her breakthrough in 2007 when her rink, consisting of herself as skip, Lisa Moerike as second, Ramsay as third, and Jessica van Ouwerkerk as lead stone (a lineup that had participated in several cashpiels the previous year), captured the 2007 provincial junior curling championships with a perfect 7–0 record. They then advanced to the 2007 Canadian Junior Curling Championships, where they finished eighth out of thirteen teams. The squad took the provincial junior championships for a second time in 2008 and repeated their feat of a perfect record, before placing ninth out of thirteen at the 2008 Canadian Junior Curling Championships. Later that year the rink took the 2008 Codiac Curling Maritime Junior Bonspiel in the Under-21 category. In 2009 Moerike was replaced with Darcee Birch, but Carmody's rink won the provincial junior championship for the third consecutive time. The squad had their best national finish at the 2009 Canadian Junior Curling Championships when they placed fourth, narrowly missing a spot in the semifinals.

=== Womens ===
==== 2009–2011 ====
In 2009 Carmody and Ramsay received a call from veteran curlers Kathy O'Rourke and Tricia Affleck, who decided to join forces with the younger players under a team skipped by O'Rourke, but with Carmody throwing the skip rocks and O'Rourke throwing second. Ramsay would throw third and Affleck would take the lead position. The squad found quick success by winning the 2010 Prince Edward Island Scotties Tournament of Hearts, which earned them the right to represent Prince Edward Island at the 2010 Scotties Tournament of Hearts. There they finished 8–3 in the round robin and eventually advanced to the final, where they lost against Jennifer Jones, who represented Team Canada as the competition's previous winner. Despite the loss, however, Carmody received the Sandra Schmirler Award as the tournament's Most Valuable Player.

==== 2011–2016 ====
For the 2011-2012 curling season Carmody, along with Geri-Lynn Ramsay, played with Calgary skip Crystal Webster. Carmody began attending the University of Calgary and Ramsay decided to make the move to Calgary when her boyfriend was offered a new job opportunity. Webster was looking for new teammates, as her third Lori Olson-Johns switched rinks to curl with Cheryl Bernard. During the 2011 tour season the rink won one event and placed second in another, earning automatic entry into the 2012 Alberta Scotties Tournament of Hearts after placing first with Alberta Curling Tour points. They made it to the semi-final of the event with a 4–2 record before losing to Heather Nedohin, the eventual winner. The team had less success the next season, winning just one game at the 2013 Alberta Scotties Tournament of Hearts. The team also played in the 2012 Canada Cup of Curling, going 3-3 and missing the playoffs.

Carmody joined the Laura Crocker rink in 2013, playing third for the team. The team played in the 2013 Canadian Olympic Curling Pre-Trials, but were eliminated in the triple knock-out event, having won just two games. The team lasted just one season, and Carmody did not return to competitive curling until the 2015-16 curling season, when she played third for Jessie Kaufman. The team played in the 2016 Alberta Scotties Tournament of Hearts, where they made it to the playoffs, but lost in the semifinal to Team Chelsea Carey.

==== 2016–2024 ====
In 2016, Carmody moved back to the east coast, and joined Team Jill Brothers, throwing third on the team. In their first season together, the team won two events. The team played in the 2017 Nova Scotia Scotties Tournament of Hearts, making it as far as the finals, where they lost to Mary Mattatall. The next season, the team won one tour event, and lost in the semifinal of the 2018 Nova Scotia Scotties Tournament of Hearts. In the 2018-19 curling season, they again won one event on the tour, and won the Nova Scotia Scotties in 2019. At the 2019 Scotties Tournament of Hearts, the team was eliminated after pool play, finishing with a 2–5 record.

The 2021 Nova Scotia Scotties was cancelled due to the COVID-19 pandemic in Nova Scotia, so the Nova Scotia Curling Association appointed the Brothers rink to represent the province at the 2021 Scotties Tournament of Hearts, as the 2020 provincial champion Mary-Anne Arsenault had moved to British Columbia. One member of Team Brothers, Sarah Murphy, opted to not attend the Scotties, with lead Jenn Brine moving up to second and alternate Emma Logan moving up to play lead. At the Tournament of Hearts, the team finished with a 3–5 record, failing to make it to the championship round. After both taking time off from competitive play, Carmody and Brothers would join Heather Smith and Marie Christianson for the 2023–24 curling season. The team consisted of Brothers throwing the fourth stones and Smith skipping the team, Christianson as second, and Carmody as lead. They had a strong season together, winning the 2024 Nova Scotia Scotties Tournament of Hearts and representing Nova Scotia at the 2024 Scotties Tournament of Hearts. At the national championship, Team Smith would finish the round robin with a 3–5 record, missing the championship round.

==== 2025–present ====
Starting in the 2025–26 curling season, Carmody would join forces with New Brunswick's Andrea Kelly where Carmody would be the second on the team alongside Jennifer Fenwick and Katie Vandenborre. With Carmody still residing in Nova Scotia, she would be the teams' "import player". They would compete at the 2026 New Brunswick Women's Curling Championship and lose to Mélodie Forsythe 7–6 in the final, finishing second.

=== Mixed ===
Carmody would play third for Brett Gallant, along with her brother Anson Carmody at second and lead Michelle Mackie at the 2011 PEI Mixed Curling Championships, where her team defeated the reigning national champion Robert Campbell in the final 5–4 to represent PEI at the 2012 Canadian Mixed Curling Championship. There, Gallant's team finished the round robin with an 8–5 record and did not advance to the semi-final.

Carmody would later compete at the 2026 Canadian Mixed Curling Championship as third on Team Nova Scotia alongside Brent MacDougall as skip, Scott Weagle as second, and Marie Christianson as lead. At the national championship, they would finish the round robin with a 7–3 record and would go on to defeat Quebec's Félix Asselin in the semifinal and New Brunswick's Sylvie Quillian 9–5 in the final to win and represent Canada at the World Mixed Curling Championship.

== Personal life ==
Carmody has a younger brother, Anson, who also curls competitively. In 2006, she entered the University of Prince Edward Island to study biology and, in 2009, won the school's Robert Haines Memorial Science Award of Merit. She is also athletically active outside of curling and was the fastest woman in a five kilometre charity race in her hometown for the Prince County Hospital, finishing fourth overall among the sixty-one competitors.

In the fall of 2011 Carmody furthered her studies at the University of Calgary. In 2019, Carmody was a student at Mount Saint Vincent University. As of 2021, she works as a research assistant with GI Research IWK Health and a clinical dietitian with IWK Health.
