= Blisse Joyce =

Canadian curler

- Curler
- Born: Blisse Comstock; March 6, 1983 (age 43); Lunenburg, Nova Scotia

Team
- Curling club: Mayflower CC; Halifax, NS

Curling career
- Member Association: Nova Scotia
- Hearts: 4 (2011, 2012, 2014, 2016)
Medal record
Women's Curling
Representing Canada
World Junior Championships
Silver medal – second place	2004 Trois-Rivières
Representing Nova Scotia
Scotties Tournament of Hearts
Bronze medal – third place	2011 Charlottetown

Blisse Joyce (born March 6, 1983, in Lunenburg, Nova Scotia, as Blisse Comstock) is a Canadian curler from Lunenburg, Nova Scotia. She is a former Canadian Junior curling champion. She currently plays for Team Jill Brothers.

== Career ==
In 2003, Joyce played second for Robyn Mattie's Boylston, Nova Scotia, junior rink. They won their provincial junior championship, giving them the right to represent Nova Scotia at the 2003 Canadian Junior Curling Championships in Ottawa (where Mattie now lives). The team finished in first place (10–2) after the round robin, but lost to Saskatchewan's Stefanie Miller in the final.

In 2004, Joyce joined the Jill Mouzar (now Brothers) team. They once again won the Nova Scotia junior title, and finished first place (9–3) at the 2004 Canadian Juniors in Victoria, British Columbia. This time they won in the final, defeating Quebec's Marie Cantin. They would go on to represent Canada at the 2004 World Junior Curling Championships in Trois-Rivières, Quebec. They went through the round robin undefeated, only to lose to Norway's Linn Githmark in the final.

Joyce played with Mouzar occasionally after juniors until Mouzar moved to Ontario. In 2010, Colleen Jones took over as skip of the team before succumbing to meningitis. Third Heather Smith became skip, and led third Danielle Parsons, second Joyce and lead Teri Lake to Joyce's first provincial women's title. They would represent Nova Scotia at the 2011 Scotties Tournament of Hearts in Charlottetown, Prince Edward Island, with a 7–4 record, going on to win the Bronze Medal Game against Ontario's Rachel Homan

For the 2011–2012 season the team will continue without Colleen Jones, who has recruited a new team.

== Personal life ==
She attended Acadia University and is employed as an accounting assistant for Clearwater Seafood. She is married to Tyson Joyce and has one child.
