= Karlee Everist =

Canadian curler (born 1991)

- Curler
- Born: September 13, 1991 (age 35); Thunder Bay, Ontario

Team
- Curling club: Halifax CC, Halifax, NS
- Skip: Christina Black
- Third: Jill Brothers
- Second: Marlee Powers
- Lead: Lindsey Burgess
- Alternate: Karlee Everist

Curling career
- Member Association: Northern Ontario (c. 2008–2012); Nova Scotia (2013–present)
- Hearts: 4 (2022, 2023, 2025, 2026)
- Top CTRS ranking: 4th (2024–25)
Medal record
Representing Nova Scotia
Canadian Olympic Curling Trials
Silver medal – second place	2025 Halifax
Scotties Tournament of Hearts
Bronze medal – third place	2025 Thunder Bay
Canadian Mixed Curling Championship
Silver medal – second place	2019 Winnipeg

Karlee Everist (born September 13, 1991, as Karlee Jones) is a Canadian curler from Bedford, Nova Scotia. She is currently the alternate on Team Christina Black.

== Career ==
=== Women ===
Everist grew up in Thunder Bay, where she was on the top junior team in the city in the late 2000s. The team included Sarah Lang, and was coached by World Champion curler Rick Lang. She was the Northern Ontario runner-up to Kendra Lilly on several occasions. Everist moved to Nova Scotia in 2012 to study pharmacy.

After moving to Nova Scotia, she joined the Kelly MacIntosh rink at lead for the 2013–14 season. The team also included third Kristen MacDiarmid and second Jennifer Crouse. In their two tour events, the DeKalb Superspiel and the Dave Jones Mayflower Cashspiel, the team was unable to reach the playoff round. Despite this, the team had a strong showing at the 2014 Nova Scotia Scotties Tournament of Hearts, finishing 6–1 through the round robin. This qualified them for the semifinal, where they beat Mary-Anne Arsenault 9–8. In the provincial final against Heather Smith, the team gave up three in the tenth end to lose 6–3.

Team MacIntosh, now known as Team Backman, found success on the tour the following season, winning the Lady Monctonian Invitational Spiel in Moncton, New Brunswick. They also played in the DeKalb SuperSpiel once again but were unable to qualify. At the 2015 Nova Scotia Scotties Tournament of Hearts, the team finished the round robin with a 4–3 record. They then beat Sarah Murphy in a tiebreaker before dropping the semifinal game to the eventual champions Team Arsenault. Kelly Backman left the team following the season, with third Kristen MacDiarmid moving up to skip and Sara Spafford coming in to play third for the 2015–16 season.

Team MacDiarmid played in four tour events during the 2015–16 season, reaching the semifinals of the Lady Monctonian Invitational Spiel and the quarterfinals of the Appleton Rum Cashspiel. They also played in the Royal LePage Women's Fall Classic in Kemptville, Ontario, not reaching the playoffs. The team was unable to qualify for the 2016 Nova Scotia Scotties Tournament of Hearts through the open qualifier, finishing 2–3. Everist left the team at the conclusion of the season.

After taking a season off, Everist joined the Emily Dwyer rink at third for the 2017–18 season. This arrangement lasted just one season, with Everist and lead Shelley Barker joining former teammates MacDiarmid and Backman the next season. The team made the playoffs in three of their four tour events this season, reaching the semifinals of the Dave Jones Mayflower Cashspiel and the New Scotland Clothing Ladies Cashspiel and the quarterfinals of the Lady Monctonian. At the 2019 Nova Scotia Scotties Tournament of Hearts, the team finished in a four-way tie for second place with a 4–3 record. They were able to beat Colleen Jones 11–5 in the tiebreaker before dropping the semifinal 8–6 to Mary-Anne Arsenault. Julie McEvoy took over skipping duties for Kristen MacDiarmid for the 2019–20 season. In their four tour events, they reached the playoffs twice. The team was unable to find success at the 2020 Nova Scotia Scotties Tournament of Hearts, finishing winless in their seven games.

Team McEvoy disbanded after just one season together. For the 2020–21 season, Everist and Barker teamed up with Christina Black and Jenn Baxter. In their first event together, the team won the 2020 The Curling Store Cashspiel. The 2021 Nova Scotia Scotties was cancelled due to the COVID-19 pandemic in Nova Scotia, so the Nova Scotia Curling Association appointed Team Jill Brothers to represent the province at the 2021 Scotties Tournament of Hearts.

Team Black won their first event of the 2021–22 season, The Curling Store Cashspiel, going undefeated to claim the title. They also reached the final of the Atlantic Superstore Monctonian Challenge, losing to the Andrea Crawford rink. In November, the team once again went undefeated to win the Tim Hortons Spitfire Arms Cash Spiel, defeating former teammate Jennifer Crouse in the final. At the 2022 Nova Scotia Scotties Tournament of Hearts, Team Black won all three qualifying events, winning the provincial title and securing their spot at the 2022 Scotties Tournament of Hearts. At the Hearts, Team Black finished the round robin with a 5–3 record, which was enough to qualify for the championship round. Along the way, they scored victories over higher-seeded teams, including Alberta's Laura Walker and Manitoba's Mackenzie Zacharias. In their championship-round match against Northern Ontario's Krista McCarville, Team Black fell behind 9–1 before coming back to make it 9–8, but eventually lost 11–8. This eliminated them from the championship.

The Black rink began the 2022–23 season at the inaugural PointsBet Invitational, where they lost to Kelsey Rocque in the opening round. They bounced back immediately in their next event, however, winning the New Scotland Clothing Women's Cashspiel in a 6–4 final over Tanya Hilliard. At the 2022 Tour Challenge Tier 2 Grand Slam of Curling event, the team went undefeated until the semifinals where they were defeated by Jessie Hunkin. Through November and December, they qualified for three straight finals. After losing to the Kaitlyn Lawes rink, skipped by Selena Njegovan, in the final of the 2022 Stu Sells 1824 Halifax Classic, they once again defeated Jennifer Crouse at the Tim Hortons Spitfire Arms Cash Spiel and then beat Marlee Powers in the final of the Bogside Cup. At the 2023 Nova Scotia Scotties Tournament of Hearts, Team Black won both the A and B events to earn two of the three spots in the playoffs. They then beat the Hilliard rink 9–4 in the semifinals to claim their second consecutive Nova Scotia Scotties title. This qualified the team for the 2023 Scotties Tournament of Hearts in Kamloops, British Columbia, where they again went 5–3 through the round robin. This qualified them for a tiebreaker where they stole in an extra end to upset the Lawes Wild Card rink. In the championship round, they again stole in an extra to beat Ontario's Rachel Homan rink before losing to Northern Ontario's McCarville in the seeding game. They then fell 9–4 to Team Canada's Kerri Einarson in the 3 vs. 4 game, settling for fourth.

The 2023–24 season began well for Team Black as they reached the final of the Summer Series, losing 5–4 to Danielle Inglis. In their third event, they reached another final where they narrowly lost to Jessica Daigle. With their success from the previous season, the team qualified as the sixth seeds for the 2023 PointsBet Invitational. After defeating Nancy Martin in the opening round, they upset Jennifer Jones in the quarterfinals before dropping the semifinal to Rachel Homan. In their next two events, the team reached the quarterfinals of both the 2023 Tour Challenge Tier 2 and the Stu Sells 1824 Halifax Classic, losing out to Madeleine Dupont and Stefania Constantini respectively. In November 2023, the team ranked sixteenth in the world, qualifying them for the 2023 National Tier 1 Slam. They finished with a 1–3 record, earning a victory over Korea's Ha Seung-youn. At the 2024 Nova Scotia Scotties Tournament of Hearts, the team easily qualified for the playoffs through the A event. They then lost to Heather Smith in the 1 vs. 2 game but defeated Mackenzie Mitchell in the semifinal to reach the final. There, they could not defend their provincial title for a third time, dropping the final 6–4 to Team Smith. After the season, the team's lead Shelley Barker retired from competitive women's play. The team then added Jill Brothers and Marlee Powers for the 2024–25 season. The revised lineup saw Brothers slot in at third with Baxter and Everist moving to second and lead respectively, and while Powers was named as the alternate, she would rotate with Baxter at second. The team had success in their first season together, winning the Tier 2 event of the 2024 Tour Challenge, qualifying them for the 2024 National Grand Slam, where they lost in the Quarterfinals to Anna Hasselborg. Black would also go on to win the 2025 NS Women's Championship, beating clubmate Mackenzie Mitchell in the final, qualifying the team to represent Nova Scotia at the 2025 Scotties Tournament of Hearts. At the 2025 Scotties, the Black rink finished 2nd in Pool B with a 6–2 record, and would make it to the semifinals, where they lost to Kerri Einarson 9–8 after a measurement in the 10th end, winning a bronze medal for Nova Scotia.

Team Black finished the 2024–25 season at number four in the Canadian Team Ranking System rankings, which earned them a pre-qualifier berth in the Scotties Tournament of Hearts, and they also prequalified for the 2025 Canadian Olympic Curling Trials based on cumulative CTRS points from 2023 to 2025. As a result, they were able to primarily focus their efforts in 2025-26 on travelling to Tier 1 and Tier 2 events outside Nova Scotia, where they could play against tougher competition and gain valuable experience. Their first major event was the 2025 AMJ Masters in London, ON, where they went 2–2 in the round-robin, missing the quarterfinals by a point. Next up for them was the 2025 PointsBet Invitational in Calgary; the seven teams that had prequalified for the Olympic Trials were automatically invited; they went 1–3 in this event, again missing the playoffs. A couple of weeks later, they flew back to Alberta for the CO-OP Tour Challenge in Nisku and fared even worse with an 0–4 record. In November, Team Black participated in the 2025 Canadian Olympic Curling Trials in their hometown of Halifax, where they would finish round-robin play in 3rd place with a 4–3 record. They would go on to beat Kerri Einarson 6–3 in the semifinals but would ultimately lose both games to Rachel Homan in the best-of-three final by 5-4 and 12-3 scores, claiming the silver medal. They went on the road one more time before the end of 2025, appearing at the 2025 HearingLife Canadian Open Tier 2 Division in Martensville, SK, which they qualified for based on their World Curling team ranking (#15). Their record at the Open was 2-2; they qualified for the quarterfinals, where they beat Isabella Wranå 7-1 and then fell to Kaitlyn Lawes in the semifinal 8–3. The last event on Team Black's calendar for the 2025–26 season was the 2026 Scotties Tournament of Hearts in Mississauga, ON. They finished second in Pool B with a 6–2 record, but struggled in the playoffs, losing to Manitoba's Lawes in the 1/2 qualifier game 8–6, defeating fellow Nova Scotian Taylour Stevens 11–6 in the 3/4 qualifier game, then falling in the Page 3/4 game to Alberta's Selena Sturmay 8–4. Team Black participated in some smaller events earlier in the season as well, making the semifinals at the Asham Ice Breaker Challenge in Morris, MB after finishing pool play with a 3–1 record, missing the playoffs at the 2025 AMJ Campbell Shorty Jenkins Classic in Cornwall, ON after a 2-3 round-robin, and won the 2025 Stu Sells 1824 Halifax Classic, finishing 4–1 in the round-robin and defeating Danielle Inglis in the final 6–5. On March 16, 2026, Team Black announced that Baxter will be leaving the team and stepping away from competitive curling to focus on other important parts of her life and to spend more time with her family. The remaining members of the team were planning to continue together for the 2026-27 season, but on April 17, 2026, Everist announced that she is expecting her second child in October and that her role with the team would be changing as a result. The next day, Team Black announced that Lindsey Burgess, who had been living in Alberta and playing second for Serena Gray-Withers, would be returning to Nova Scotia, where she grew up and went to school, to take over the lead position in the 2026-27 season while Everist steps back into the alternate role. Black said that giving Burgess the lead role "will help us have a consistent lineup for the whole season, not having to change halfway through. It’s the best route to take for our year."

=== Mixed doubles ===
Everist plays in the mixed doubles discipline with her husband Bryce Everist. The pair has represented Nova Scotia at the Canadian Mixed Doubles Curling Championship four times, in 2018, 2019, 2021 and 2023. Their best finish came at the 2023 Canadian Mixed Doubles Curling Championship in Sudbury, Ontario, where the team qualified for the playoffs for the first time with a 5–2 record. They then lost in the qualification games to Ontario's Lynn Kreviazuk and David Mathers. They also finished 4–3 in 2018, 1–6 in 2019 and 3–3 in 2021.

=== Mixed ===
Everist was also a part of the Nova Scotia mixed team that represented the province at the 2019 Canadian Mixed Curling Championship in Winnipeg, Manitoba. Her team, with skip Kendal Thompson, third Marie Christianson, and second Bryce Everist, finished second in Pool B in the round-robin with a 5–1 record. They split their placement round games with a 2–2 record, defeated Québec's Félix Asselin in the semifinal 5–3 before falling to Manitoba's Colin Kurz in the final 5–3, winning the silver medal. She was named the tournament's Canadian Mixed Sportsmanship Award winner at lead.

== Personal life ==
Everist's father, Trevor Jones, was one of the top amateur golfers in Northwestern Ontario in the 1980s and 1990s.

Everist is employed as a pharmacist at the IWK Health Centre. She is married to fellow curler Bryce Everist, and has one child.

== Teams ==
Season	Skip	Third	Second	Lead	Alternate
2010–11	Karlee Jones	Grace Francisci	Victoria Anderson	Sheree Hinz	
2011–12	Karlee Jones	Grace Francisci	Victoria Anderson	Kim Zsakai	
2013–14	Kelly MacIntosh	Kristen MacDiarmid	Jennifer Crouse	Karlee Jones	
2014–15	Kelly Backman	Kristen MacDiarmid	Jennifer Crouse	Karlee Jones	
2015–16	Kristen MacDiarmid	Sara Spafford	Jennifer Crouse	Karlee Jones	
2017–18	Emily Dwyer	Karlee Jones	MacKenzie Proctor	Shelley Barker	
2018–19	Kristen MacDiarmid	Kelly Backman	Karlee Jones	Shelley Barker	
2019–20	Julie McEvoy	Kelly Backman	Karlee Jones	Shelley Barker	
2020–21	Christina Black	Jenn Baxter	Karlee Jones	Shelley Barker	
2021–22	Christina Black	Jenn Baxter	Karlee Everist	Shelley Barker	
2022–23	Christina Black	Jenn Baxter	Karlee Everist	Shelley Barker	
2023–24	Christina Black	Jenn Baxter	Karlee Everist	Shelley Barker	
2024–25	Christina Black	Jill Brothers	Jenn Baxter	Karlee Everist	Marlee Powers
2025–26	Christina Black	Jill Brothers	Jenn Baxter	Karlee Everist	Marlee Powers
2026–27	Christina Black	Jill Brothers	Marlee Powers	Lindsey Burgess	Karlee Everist
