= Marlee Powers =

Canadian curler

- Curler
- Born: July 17, 1991 (age 35); Bridgewater, Nova Scotia, Canada

Team
- Curling club: Halifax CC, Halifax, NS
- Skip: Christina Black
- Third: Jill Brothers
- Second: Marlee Powers
- Lead: Lindsey Burgess
- Alternate: Karlee Everist
- Mixed doubles partner: Luke Saunders

Curling career
- Member Association: Nova Scotia
- Hearts: 2 (2025, 2026)
- Top CTRS ranking: 6th (2025–26)
Medal record
Representing Nova Scotia
Canadian Olympic Curling Trials
Silver medal – second place	2025 Halifax
Scotties Tournament of Hearts
Bronze medal – third place	2025 Thunder Bay
Canadian Mixed Doubles Championship
Silver medal – second place	2025 Summerside

Marlee Powers (born July 17, 1991 in Bridgewater) is a Canadian curler from Halifax, Nova Scotia. She currently plays second on Team Christina Black.

== Career ==
=== Women's ===
Powers joined the Theresa Breen rink at third for the 2017–18 season. The team had a strong start to the season, winning the Lady Monctonian Invitational Spiel and reaching the final of the Lakeshore Curling Club Cashspiel and the Dave Jones Mayflower Cashspiel. With these strong results, the team earned enough points to qualify for the 2017 Canadian Olympic Curling Pre-Trials in Summerside, Prince Edward Island. The spot was initially given to Stefanie Lawton, however, she did not retain three of her four players from the 2016–17 season, giving the spot to Breen. At the Pre-Trials, the team upset the top ranked Tracy Fleury rink in their opening game and then defeated 2006 Olympic bronze medallist Shannon Kleibrink. Ultimately, they finished 3–3 through the preliminary round before dropping a tiebreaker to Nadine Scotland, eliminating them from contention. At the 2018 Nova Scotia Scotties Tournament of Hearts, Team Breen finished 4–3 in the round robin but were once again eliminated in a tiebreaker, losing 8–5 to Jill Brothers.

The Breen rink struggled to find success during the 2018–19 season, failing to qualify in all six tour events played. These struggles continued into the 2019 Nova Scotia Scotties Tournament of Hearts where they won just two games, finishing at the bottom of the pool with a 2–5 record. The following season, they reached their fourth final as a team at the Dave Jones Mayflower Cashspiel, dropping a 5–3 game to Japan's Tori Koana. This was their only playoff appearance of the season, however, with a 3–4 record at the 2020 Nova Scotia Scotties Tournament of Hearts ending the teams run together. Powers was set to skip her own team for the 2020–21 season before it got cancelled due to the COVID-19 pandemic.

For the 2021–22 season, Powers and former teammates Jocelyn Adams and Amanda Simpson teamed up with Emily Dwyer. With Powers at the helm, the team reached the playoffs in two tour stops in Moncton and Windsor. For the 2022 Nova Scotia Scotties Tournament of Hearts, Sarah Mallais of New Brunswick replaced Dwyer who was travelling for work with the World Curling Federation. The team failed to advance to the playoffs, finishing 1–3 through the triple knockout qualifying round. Dwyer was replaced on the team the following season by Mary Myketyn-Driscoll. This lineup saw significantly more success with the team qualifying in four of five events. This included a finals appearance at the Bogside Cup and semifinal finishes at the Superstore Lady Monctonian, the Tim Hortons Spitfire Arms Cash Spiel and the Jim Sullivan Curling Classic. Entering the 2023 Nova Scotia Scotties Tournament of Hearts as the second ranked team, the Powers rink finished third after losing in the C qualifier to Tanya Hilliard.

After three seasons as a skip, Powers moved to second when she joined the Jessica Daigle rink for the 2023–24 season. With third Mary Myketyn-Driscoll and lead Lindsey Burgess, the team won The Curling Store Cashspiel to start the year. In October, Myketyn-Driscoll left the team and was replaced by New Brunswick's Katie Vandenborre. Leading up to provincials, the team had back-to-back semifinal appearances in Fredericton and Montague, losing out to Heather Smith and Tanya Hilliard. At the 2024 Nova Scotia Scotties Tournament of Hearts, Team Daigle had a hot start, winning two straight games to reach the A qualifier. They then lost their next three games, eliminating them from contention. Following the season, Powers was added to the Christina Black rink as their alternate for the 2024–25 season, although she would rotate with Jenn Baxter at second. The team had success in their first season together, winning the Tier 2 event of the 2024 Tour Challenge, qualifying them for the 2024 National Grand Slam, where they lost in the Quarterfinals to Anna Hasselborg. Black would also go on to win the 2025 NS Women's Championship, beating clubmate Mackenzie Mitchell in the final, qualifying the team to represent Nova Scotia at the 2025 Scotties Tournament of Hearts. At the 2025 Scotties, the Black rink finished 2nd in Pool B with a 6–2 record, and would make it to the semifinals, where she lost to Kerri Einarson 9–8 after a measurement in the 10th end, winning a bronze medal for Nova Scotia.

Team Black finished the 2024–25 season at number four in the Canadian Team Ranking System rankings, which earned them a pre-qualifier berth in the Scotties Tournament of Hearts, and they also prequalified for the 2025 Canadian Olympic Curling Trials based on cumulative CTRS points from 2023 to 2025. As a result, they were able to primarily focus their efforts in 2025-26 on travelling to Tier 1 and Tier 2 events outside Nova Scotia, where they could play against tougher competition and gain valuable experience. Their first major event was the 2025 AMJ Masters in London, ON, where they went 2–2 in the round-robin, missing the quarterfinals by a point. Next up for them was the 2025 PointsBet Invitational in Calgary; the seven teams that had prequalified for the Olympic Trials were automatically invited; they went 1–3 in this event, again missing the playoffs. A couple of weeks later, they flew back to Alberta for the CO-OP Tour Challenge in Nisku and fared even worse with an 0–4 record. In November, Team Black participated in the 2025 Canadian Olympic Curling Trials in their hometown of Halifax, where they would finish round-robin play in 3rd place with a 4–3 record. They would go on to beat Kerri Einarson 6–3 in the semifinals but would ultimately lose both games to Rachel Homan in the best-of-three final by 5-4 and 12-3 scores, claiming the silver medal. They went on the road one more time before the end of 2025, appearing at the 2025 HearingLife Canadian Open Tier 2 Division in Martensville, SK, which they qualified for based on their World Curling team ranking (#15). Their record at the Open was 2-2; they qualified for the quarterfinals, where they beat Isabella Wranå 7-1 and then fell to Kaitlyn Lawes in the semifinal 8–3. The last event on Team Black's calendar for the 2025–26 season was the 2026 Scotties Tournament of Hearts in Mississauga, ON. They finished second in Pool B with a 6–2 record, but struggled in the playoffs, losing to Manitoba's Lawes in the 1/2 qualifier game 8–6, defeating fellow Nova Scotian Taylour Stevens 11–6 in the 3/4 qualifier game, then falling in the Page 3/4 game to Alberta's Selena Sturmay 8–4. Team Black participated in some smaller events earlier in the season as well, making the semifinals at the Asham Ice Breaker Challenge in Morris, MB after finishing pool play with a 3–1 record, missing the playoffs at the 2025 AMJ Campbell Shorty Jenkins Classic in Cornwall, ON after a 2-3 round-robin, and won the 2025 Stu Sells 1824 Halifax Classic, finishing 4–1 in the round-robin and defeating Danielle Inglis in the final 6–5. On March 16, 2026, Team Black announced that Baxter will be leaving the team and stepping away from competitive curling to focus on other important parts of her life and to spend more time with her family. The remaining members of the team were planning to continue together for the 2026-27 season, but on April 17, 2026, Everist announced that she is expecting her second child in October and that her role with the team would be changing as a result. The next day, Team Black announced that Lindsey Burgess, who had been living in Alberta and playing second for Serena Gray-Withers, would be returning to Nova Scotia, where she grew up and went to school, to take over the lead position in the 2026-27 season while Everist steps back into the alternate role. Black said that giving Burgess the lead role "will help us have a consistent lineup for the whole season, not having to change halfway through. It’s the best route to take for our year."

=== Mixed ===
In 2022, Powers competed in the 2022 Canadian Mixed Curling Championship with Paul Flemming, Marie Christianson and Scott Saccary. The team had previously won the Nova Scotia mixed provincial with Jill Brothers, however, she was unable to attend the national championship. Through the round robin, the team finished with a 4–2 record, enough to qualify for the championship pool. They then lost three of their next four games, finishing eighth with an even 5–5 record. The following year, she won the provincial mixed championship, playing with fiancé Luke Saunders, his mother Colleen Jones and Flemming. This squad had much more success, finishing 7–3 through the round robin and championship pools and qualifying for the playoffs. They then lost to Saskatchewan and Ontario in the semifinal and bronze medal game, respectively, finishing fourth.

=== Mixed doubles ===
Powers plays mixed doubles with her fiancé, Luke Saunders. In 2024, Powers and Saunders won the Nova Scotia mixed doubles championship, qualifying for the 2024 Canadian Mixed Doubles Curling Championship in Fredericton. The pair had a strong start with wins in four of their first five games. They then lost both of their last two games on the final day of round robin, eliminating them with a 4–3 record. Powers and Saunders returned to the 2025 Canadian Mixed Doubles Curling Championship, where they would improve on their previous year's appearance, finishing second, losing to Kadriana Lott and Colton Lott 9–8 in the final. That second-place finish allowed Powers and Saunders to pre-qualify for the 2026 Canadian Mixed Doubles Curling Championship in Surrey, BC. In that event, they won their first three games, but went on to lose the next three, leaving them third in Pool D and missing the playoffs.

=== Rock League ===
On December 16, 2025, Powers was named a participant in the inaugural season of the Rock League professional curling league, which took place in Toronto from April 6-12, 2026. She was part of the Shield Curling Club, one of two franchises composed predominantly of Canadian players; its captain was Brad Jacobs, and its general manager was Carter Rycroft. Powers played women’s fours in the first match and only played mixed doubles the rest of the way. She did not participate in the mixed fours match. Shield won the league championship over the Typhoon Curling Club.

== Personal life ==
Powers is employed as a planning and logistics manager at Nova Scotia Health Authority. She is engaged to fellow curler Luke Saunders who she plays mixed doubles with. She previously played volleyball while attending Dalhousie University.

== Teams ==
Season	Skip	Third	Second	Lead	Alternate
2014–15	Marlee Powers	Tara LeGay	Leah Squarey	Laura Murray	
2017–18	Theresa Breen	Marlee Powers	Jocelyn Adams	Amanda Simpson	
2018–19	Theresa Breen	Marlee Powers	Jocelyn Adams	Amanda Simpson	
2019–20	Theresa Breen	Marlee Powers	Jocelyn Adams	Amanda Simpson	Mary Sue Radford
2020–21	Marlee Powers	Jocelyn Adams	Emily Dwyer	Amanda Simpson	
2021–22	Marlee Powers	Jocelyn Adams	Emily Dwyer	Amanda Simpson	Sarah Mallais
2022–23	Marlee Powers	Mary Myketyn-Driscoll	Jocelyn Adams	Amanda England	
2023–24	Jessica Daigle	Mary Myketyn-Driscoll	Marlee Powers	Lindsey Burgess	
2023–24	Jessica Daigle	Marlee Powers	Lindsey Burgess	Katie Vandenborre	
2024–25	Christina Black	Jill Brothers	Jenn Baxter	Karlee Everist	Marlee Powers
2025–26	Christina Black	Jill Brothers	Jenn Baxter	Karlee Everist	Marlee Powers
2026–27	Christina Black	Jill Brothers	Marlee Powers	Lindsey Burgess	Karlee Everist
