= Jenn Baxter =

Canadian curler

Jennifer Baxter
- Curler
- Born: April 4, 1987 (age 39); Halifax, Nova Scotia, Canada

Team
- Curling club: Mayflower CC, Halifax, NS

Curling career
- Member Association: Nova Scotia
- Hearts: 8 (2013, 2015, 2018, 2020, 2022, 2023, 2025, 2026)
- Top CTRS ranking: 4th (2024–25)
Medal record
Women's curling
Representing Nova Scotia
Canadian Olympic Curling Trials
Silver medal – second place	2025 Halifax
Scotties Tournament of Hearts
Bronze medal – third place	2018 Pentiction
Bronze medal – third place	2025 Thunder Bay
Canadian Mixed Curling Championship
Gold medal – first place	2024 St. Catharines

Jennifer Baxter (born April 4, 1987 in Halifax, Nova Scotia) is a Canadian curler from Lower Sackville, Nova Scotia.

== Career ==
=== Juniors ===
During Baxter's junior eligibility years, she would make one appearance at the Canadian Junior Curling Championships. This appearance took place at the 2007 Canadian Junior Curling Championships, where Baxter, playing lead for Marie Christianson, represented Nova Scotia. Her team failed to make the playoffs, finishing round robin with a 6-6 record.

=== Women's ===
Baxter would team up with and play second for Mary-Anne Arsenault at the start of the 2009/2010 curling season. The team entered the 2010 Nova Scotia Scotties Tournament of Hearts, where they quickly found success. They would finish round robin in first place with a 5-2, and received a bye to the final. There they faced Nancy McConnery, where their success came to an end, losing the championship game 4-5.

The team would return to the provincials in 2011, where, for a second year in a row, they would finish with a 5-2 record. This was enough to secure second place. They would meet Heather Smith-Dacey in the semi-final, but would lose 3-8.

In 2012, Baxter would change positions and move to lead when Arsenault brought former teammate Kim Kelly into the lineup at second. The team entered the 2012 Nova Scotia Scotties Tournament of Hearts, where they finished the round-robin with a 4-3 record. This was enough to take the team into a tiebreaker. They would face Colleen Pinkney in the tiebreaker game, but would not find success, losing and missing out on the playoffs.

For the 2012-13 curling season, the Arsenault team made another lineup change. Another former teammate of Arsenault, Colleen Jones, was added to the lineup at third. Baxter continued to play lead. Adding the veteran Jones to the rink proved to be successful, as the team finally won the provincial championship, when they defeated the Jocelyn Nix rink in the final of the 2013 Nova Scotia Scotties Tournament of Hearts. The team represented Nova Scotia at the 2013 Scotties Tournament of Hearts, where they finished with a 5-6 record.

The following season, Jones left the rink and was replaced by Kelly at third, and Christie Gamble joined the rink at second. The team made the playoffs at the 2014 Nova Scotia Scotties Tournament of Hearts, after finishing the round robin with a 5-2 record. However, they could not repeat their provincial championship, losing in the semi-final to the Kelly MacIntosh rink. After the season, Kelly and Gamble would be replaced with Christina Black and Jane Snyder. The team won two tour events early in the season, the Dave Jones Molson Mayflower Cashspiel and the Gibson's Cashspiel. They also won the 2015 Nova Scotia Scotties Tournament of Hearts, qualifying them for the 2015 Scotties Tournament of Hearts. There, the team finished in seventh place with a 5–6 record. In 2016, Jennifer Crouse joined at second when Snyder left the team. A few seasons later, they won the 2018 Nova Scotia Scotties Tournament of Hearts and won a bronze medal at the 2018 Scotties Tournament of Hearts. Later that year, the team won the 2018 New Scotland Clothing Ladies Cashspiel.

The Arsenault rink began the 2019–20 season by winning the 2019 Curling Store Cashspiel. The team won the provincial Scotties again in 2020, and represented Nova Scotia at the 2020 Scotties Tournament of Hearts with new lead Emma Logan. The team finished pool play with a 4–3 round-robin record, tied with British Columbia's Corryn Brown rink. They lost to British Columbia in a tiebreaker, failing to advance.

In 2020, Arsenault announced she was moving to British Columbia. Baxter then joined the new rink skipped by Christina Black at third with front end Karlee Jones and Shelley Barker. In their first event together, the team won the 2020 Curling Store Cashspiel. The 2021 Nova Scotia Scotties was cancelled due to the COVID-19 pandemic in Nova Scotia, so the Nova Scotia Curling Association appointed Team Jill Brothers to represent the province at the 2021 Scotties Tournament of Hearts. Team Black would have been selected as the Nova Scotia representatives, however, they did not retain three out of their four players from the previous season.

Team Black won their first event of the 2021–22 season, The Curling Store Cashspiel, going undefeated to claim the title. They also reached the final of the Atlantic Superstore Monctonian Challenge, losing to the Andrea Crawford rink. In November, the team once again went undefeated to win the Tim Hortons Spitfire Arms Cash Spiel, defeating former teammate Jennifer Crouse in the final. At the 2022 Nova Scotia Scotties Tournament of Hearts, Team Black won all three qualifying events, winning the provincial title and securing their spot at the 2022 Scotties Tournament of Hearts. At the Hearts, the team had a 5–3 record in the round robin, which was enough to qualify for the championship round. Along the way, they scored victories over higher seeded teams such as Alberta's Laura Walker and Manitoba's Mackenzie Zacharias. They also defeated British Columbia, which was being skipped by former teammate Mary-Anne Arsenault. In their championship round match against Northern Ontario's Krista McCarville, Team Black got down 9–1 before coming back to make the game 9–8, eventually losing 11–8. This eliminated them from the championship.

The Black rink began the 2022–23 season at the inaugural PointsBet Invitational, where they lost to Kelsey Rocque in the opening round. They bounced back immediately in their next event, however, winning the New Scotland Clothing Women's Cashspiel in a 6–4 final over Tanya Hilliard. At the 2022 Tour Challenge Tier 2 Grand Slam of Curling event, the team went undefeated until the semifinals where they were defeated by Jessie Hunkin. Through November and December, they qualified for three straight finals. After losing to the Kaitlyn Lawes rink, skipped by Selena Njegovan, in the final of the 2022 Stu Sells 1824 Halifax Classic, they once again defeated Jennifer Crouse at the Tim Hortons Spitfire Arms Cash Spiel and then beat Marlee Powers in the final of the Bogside Cup. At the 2023 Nova Scotia Scotties Tournament of Hearts, Team Black won both the A and B events to earn two of the three spots in the playoffs. They then beat the Hilliard rink 9–4 in the semifinals to claim their second consecutive Nova Scotia Scotties title. This qualified the team for the 2023 Scotties Tournament of Hearts in Kamloops, British Columbia where they again went 5–3 through the round robin. This qualified them for a tiebreaker where they stole in an extra end to upset the Lawes Wild Card rink. In the championship round, they again stole in an extra to beat Ontario's Rachel Homan rink before losing to Northern Ontario's McCarville in the seeding game. They then fell 9–4 to Team Canada's Kerri Einarson in the 3 vs. 4 game, settling for fourth.

The 2023–24 season began well for Team Black as they reached the final of the Summer Series, losing 5–4 to Danielle Inglis. In their third event, they reached another final where they narrowly lost to Jessica Daigle. With their success from the previous season, the team qualified as the sixth seeds for the 2023 PointsBet Invitational. After defeating Nancy Martin in the opening round, they upset Jennifer Jones in the quarterfinals before dropping the semifinal to Rachel Homan. In their next two events, the team reached the quarterfinals of both the 2023 Tour Challenge Tier 2 and the Stu Sells 1824 Halifax Classic, losing out to Madeleine Dupont and Stefania Constantini respectively. In November 2023, the team ranked sixteenth in the world, qualifying them for the 2023 National Tier 1 Slam. They finished with a 1–3 record, earning a victory over Korea's Ha Seung-youn. At the 2024 Nova Scotia Scotties Tournament of Hearts, the team easily qualified for the playoffs through the A event. They then lost to Heather Smith in the 1 vs. 2 game but defeated Mackenzie Mitchell in the semifinal to reach the final. There, they could not defend their provincial title for a third time, dropping the final 6–4 to Team Smith. After the season, the team's lead Shelley Barker retired from competitive women's play. The team then added Jill Brothers and Marlee Powers for the 2024–25 season.

The revised lineup saw Brothers slot in at third with Baxter and Everist moving to second and lead respectively, and while Powers was named as the alternate, she would rotate with Baxter at second. The team had success in their first season together, winning the Tier 2 event of the 2024 Tour Challenge, qualifying them for the 2024 National Grand Slam, where they lost in the Quarterfinals to Anna Hasselborg. Black would also go on to win the 2025 NS Women's Championship, beating clubmate Mackenzie Mitchell in the final, qualifying the team to represent Nova Scotia at the 2025 Scotties Tournament of Hearts. At the 2025 Scotties, the Black rink finished 2nd in Pool B with a 6–2 record, and would make it to the semifinals, where they lost to Kerri Einarson 9–8 after a measurement in the 10th end, winning a bronze medal for Nova Scotia. Baxter had to leave the game early due to a family emergency, which was later revealed to be the death of her father, Blair.

Team Black finished the 2024–25 season at number four in the Canadian Team Ranking System rankings, which earned them a pre-qualifier berth in the Scotties Tournament of Hearts, and they also prequalified for the 2025 Canadian Olympic Curling Trials based on cumulative CTRS points from 2023 to 2025. As a result, they were able to primarily focus their efforts in 2025-26 on travelling to Tier 1 and Tier 2 events outside Nova Scotia, where they could play against tougher competition and gain valuable experience. Their first major event was the 2025 AMJ Masters in London, ON, where they went 2–2 in the round-robin, missing the quarterfinals by a point. Next up for them was the 2025 PointsBet Invitational in Calgary; the seven teams that had prequalified for the Olympic Trials were automatically invited; they went 1–3 in this event, again missing the playoffs. A couple of weeks later, they flew back to Alberta for the CO-OP Tour Challenge in Nisku and fared even worse with an 0–4 record. In November, Team Black participated in the 2025 Canadian Olympic Curling Trials in their hometown of Halifax, where they would finish round-robin play in 3rd place with a 4–3 record. They would go on to beat Kerri Einarson 6–3 in the semifinals but would ultimately lose both games to Rachel Homan in the best-of-three final by 5-4 and 12-3 scores, claiming the silver medal. They went on the road one more time before the end of 2025, appearing at the 2025 HearingLife Canadian Open Tier 2 Division in Martensville, SK, which they qualified for based on their World Curling team ranking (#15). Their record at the Open was 2-2; they qualified for the quarterfinals, where they beat Isabella Wranå 7-1 and then fell to Kaitlyn Lawes in the semifinal 8–3. The last event on Team Black's calendar for the 2025–26 season was the 2026 Scotties Tournament of Hearts in Mississauga, ON. They finished second in Pool B with a 6–2 record, but struggled in the playoffs, losing to Manitoba's Lawes in the 1/2 qualifier game 8–6, defeating fellow Nova Scotian Taylour Stevens 11–6 in the 3/4 qualifier game, then falling in the Page 3/4 game to Alberta's Selena Sturmay 8–4. Team Black participated in some smaller events earlier in the season as well, making the semifinals at the Asham Ice Breaker Challenge in Morris, MB after finishing pool play with a 3–1 record, missing the playoffs at the 2025 AMJ Campbell Shorty Jenkins Classic in Cornwall, ON after a 2-3 round-robin, and won the 2025 Stu Sells 1824 Halifax Classic, finishing 4–1 in the round-robin and defeating Danielle Inglis in the final 6–5.

On March 16, 2026, Team Black announced that Baxter will be leaving the team and stepping away from competitive curling to focus on other important parts of her life and to spend more time with her family. The remaining members of the team will continue together for the 2026-27 season.

=== Mixed Doubles ===
Baxter has competed twice in the Canadian Mixed Doubles Curling Championship. In 2016, she competed with Mark Dacey and went 5-2 in the round-robin, but they lost their lone playoff game. In 2017, Baxter and Dacey returned to the tournament and had an identical showing, going 5-2 in the round-robin before dropping their lone playoff game.

=== Mixed ===
Baxter represented Nova Scotia in the Canadian Mixed Curling Championship in 2024. She won the gold medal with Owen Purcell as skip in 2024 (and Team Black skip Christina Black as third), finishing second in Pool A in the round-robin with a 5-1 record, winning all four of their placement round games, then defeating both Ryan Wiebe's Manitoba team 7-4 in the semifinal and Saskatchewan's Jason Ackerman in the gold medal game 5-4.

== Personal life ==
Baxter is employed as a learning centre teacher with the Halifax Regional Centre for Education. She is married to Jason Wilson and has two stepchildren.

== Teams ==
Season	Skip	Third	Second	Lead
2009–10	Mary-Anne Arsenault	Marie Christianson	Jenn Baxter	Kelly MacIntosh
2010–11	Mary-Anne Arsenault	Stephanie McVicar	Jenn Baxter	Kelly MacIntosh
2011–12	Mary-Anne Arsenault	Stephanie McVicar	Kim Kelly	Jenn Baxter
2012–13	Mary-Anne Arsenault	Colleen Jones	Kim Kelly	Jenn Baxter
2013–14	Mary-Anne Arsenault	Kim Kelly	Christie Gamble	Jenn Baxter
2014–15	Mary-Anne Arsenault	Christina Black	Jane Snyder	Jenn Baxter
2015–16	Mary-Anne Arsenault	Christina Black	Jane Snyder	Jenn Baxter
2016–17	Mary-Anne Arsenault	Christina Black	Jennifer Crouse	Jenn Baxter
2017–18	Mary-Anne Arsenault	Christina Black	Jenn Baxter	Jennifer Crouse
2018–19	Mary-Anne Arsenault	Christina Black	Jenn Baxter	Kristin Clarke
2019–20	Mary-Anne Arsenault	Christina Black	Jenn Baxter	Emma Logan
2020–21	Christina Black	Jenn Baxter	Karlee Jones	Shelley Barker
2021–22	Christina Black	Jenn Baxter	Karlee Everist	Shelley Barker
2022–23	Christina Black	Jenn Baxter	Karlee Everist	Shelley Barker
2023–24	Christina Black	Jenn Baxter	Karlee Everist	Shelley Barker
2024–25	Christina Black	Jill Brothers	Jenn Baxter	Karlee Everist
2025–26	Christina Black	Jill Brothers	Jenn Baxter	Karlee Everist
