= 2014 Nova Scotia Scotties Tournament of Hearts =

- Host city: Sydney, Nova Scotia
- Arena: Sydney Curling Club
- Dates: January 7–12
- Winner: Heather Smith
- Curling club: Mayflower CC, Halifax
- Skip: Heather Smith
- Third: Jill Brothers
- Second: Blisse Joyce
- Lead: Teri Lake
- Finalist: Kelly MacIntosh

The 2014 Nova Scotia Scotties Tournament of Hearts, the provincial women's curling championship for Nova Scotia, was held January 7 to 12 at the Sydney Curling Club in Sydney. The winning team of Heather Smith represented Nova Scotia at the 2014 Scotties Tournament of Hearts in Montreal.

== Teams ==
Skip	Third	Second	Lead	Club(s)
Mary-Anne Arsenault	Kim Kelly	Christie Gamble	Jennifer Baxter	Mayflower Curling Club, Halifax
Christina Black	Jane Snyder	Katarina Hakansson	Mary Sue Radford	Mayflower Curling Club, Halifax
Anne Dillon	Sheen Moore	Jill Thomas	Shelley Barker	CFB Halifax Curling Club, Halifax
Tanya Hilliard	Amanda Simpson	Jocelyn Adams	Julia Williams	Mayflower Curling Club, Halifax
Kelly MacIntosh	Kristen MacDiarmid	Jennifer Crouse	Karlee Jones	Dartmouth Curling Club, Dartmouth
Jocelyn Nix	Andrea Saulnier	Jill Alcoe-Holland	Julie Morley	Glooscap Curling Club, Kentville
Sarah Rhyno	Mary Mattatall	Liz Woodworth	Jenn Brine	Mayflower Curling Club, Halifax
Heather Smith	Jill Brothers	Blisse Joyce	Teri Lake	Mayflower Curling Club, Halifax

== Round-robin standings ==
Final round-robin standings

Key
Teams to Playoffs

Skip (Club)	W	L
Heather Smith (Mayflower)	7	0
Kelly MacIntosh (Dartmouth)	6	1
Mary-Anne Arsenault (Mayflower)	5	2
Tanya Hilliard (Mayflower)	3	4
Sarah Rhyno (Mayflower)	3	4
Jocelyn Nix (Glooscap)	2	5
Anne Dillon (CFB Halifax)	1	6
Mary Sue Radford (Mayflower)	1	6

== Round-robin results ==
=== Draw 1 ===
Wednesday, January 8, 1:00 pm

Sheet 1	1	2	3	4	5	6	7	8	9	10	Final
Sarah Rhyno	2	0	0	0	1	0	2	0	0	1	6
Kelly MacIntosh 🔨	0	0	1	0	0	2	0	0	4	0	7

Sheet 2	1	2	3	4	5	6	7	8	9	10	Final
Mary-Anne Arsenault 🔨	1	0	1	0	1	2	1	2	X	X	8
Anne Dillon	0	1	0	2	0	0	0	0	X	X	3

Sheet 3	1	2	3	4	5	6	7	8	9	10	11	Final
Jocelyn Nix	1	0	0	0	1	0	2	0	1	0	0	5
Mary-Sue Radford 🔨	0	1	1	0	0	1	0	1	0	1	1	6

Sheet 4	1	2	3	4	5	6	7	8	9	10	Final
Heather Smith	0	3	0	2	2	1	X	X	X	X	8
Tanya Hilliard 🔨	1	0	1	0	0	0	X	X	X	X	2

=== Draw 2 ===
Wednesday, January 8, 7:00 pm

Sheet 1	1	2	3	4	5	6	7	8	9	10	Final
Mary-Anne Arsenault 🔨	2	0	2	1	2	0	0	3	X	X	10
Mary-Sue Radford	0	1	0	0	0	1	1	0	X	X	3

Sheet 2	1	2	3	4	5	6	7	8	9	10	Final
Heather Smith	2	0	0	0	2	1	0	1	0	1	7
Kelly MacIntosh 🔨	0	2	1	0	0	0	3	0	0	0	6

Sheet 3	1	2	3	4	5	6	7	8	9	10	Final
Tanya Hilliard 🔨	2	1	0	2	0	3	1	0	0	1	10
Sarah Rhyno	0	0	2	0	3	0	0	3	1	0	9

Sheet 4	1	2	3	4	5	6	7	8	9	10	Final
Anne Dillon	0	0	0	3	0	1	1	1	0	1	7
Jocelyn Nix 🔨	3	1	1	0	2	0	0	0	2	0	9

=== Draw 3 ===
Thursday, January 9, 1:00 pm

Sheet 1	1	2	3	4	5	6	7	8	9	10	Final
Anne Dillon	1	1	1	0	0	1	0	0	1	0	5
Heather Smith 🔨	0	0	0	2	0	0	2	1	0	1	6

Sheet 2	1	2	3	4	5	6	7	8	9	10	Final
Tanya Hilliard	0	0	0	0	0	2	0	0	0	X	2
Jocelyn Nix 🔨	0	1	0	1	2	0	2	0	1	X	7

Sheet 3	1	2	3	4	5	6	7	8	9	10	Final
Mary-Anne Arsenault	0	0	0	2	0	0	0	1	0	0	3
Kelly MacIntosh 🔨	0	0	1	0	0	1	0	0	1	1	4

Sheet 4	1	2	3	4	5	6	7	8	9	10	Final
Sarah Rhyno 🔨	0	0	0	1	0	0	0	4	0	X	5
Mary-Sue Radford	0	0	0	0	0	0	1	0	2	X	3

=== Draw 4 ===
Thursday, January 9, 7:00 pm

Sheet 1	1	2	3	4	5	6	7	8	9	10	Final
Kelly MacIntosh 🔨	0	1	0	3	2	3	X	X	X	X	9
Jocelyn Nix	0	0	1	0	0	0	X	X	X	X	1

Sheet 2	1	2	3	4	5	6	7	8	9	10	Final
Mary-Sue Radford	0	0	1	0	1	0	1	0	1	X	4
Heather Smith 🔨	1	0	0	1	0	3	0	1	0	X	6

Sheet 3	1	2	3	4	5	6	7	8	9	10	Final
Sarah Rhyno	0	1	0	1	0	0	1	0	2	1	6
Anne Dillon 🔨	1	0	0	0	1	1	0	1	0	0	4

Sheet 4	1	2	3	4	5	6	7	8	9	10	Final
Mary-Anne Arsenault	0	0	2	1	0	1	0	1	0	3	8
Tanya Hilliard 🔨	1	0	0	0	1	0	2	0	2	0	6

=== Draw 5 ===
Friday, January 10, 1:00 pm

Sheet 1	1	2	3	4	5	6	7	8	9	10	Final
Tanya Hilliard	0	1	1	0	1	0	2	0	0	2	7
Anne Dillon 🔨	1	0	0	2	0	2	0	1	0	0	6

Sheet 2	1	2	3	4	5	6	7	8	9	10	Final
Sarah Rhyno	0	0	2	0	0	0	2	1	0	0	5
Mary-Anne Arsenault 🔨	2	2	0	0	0	1	0	0	0	1	6

Sheet 3	1	2	3	4	5	6	7	8	9	10	Final
Jocelyn Nix	0	0	1	0	0	0	0	1	0	X	2
Heather Smith 🔨	0	2	0	0	0	1	0	0	3	X	6

Sheet 4	1	2	3	4	5	6	7	8	9	10	Final
Mary-Sue Radford 🔨	0	3	0	0	0	0	0	0	0	0	3
Kelly MacIntosh	0	0	0	0	1	0	0	1	1	2	5

=== Draw 6 ===
Friday, January 10, 7:00 pm

Sheet 1	1	2	3	4	5	6	7	8	9	10	Final
Heather Smith	0	0	1	0	2	0	1	1	0	1	6
Sarah Rhyno 🔨	0	1	0	2	0	1	0	0	1	0	5

Sheet 2	1	2	3	4	5	6	7	8	9	10	11	Final
Kelly MacIntosh	0	1	0	0	1	0	0	1	0	2	1	6
Tanya Hilliard 🔨	1	0	0	1	0	1	0	0	2	0	0	5

Sheet 3	1	2	3	4	5	6	7	8	9	10	11	Final
Jocelyn Nix	0	1	0	1	0	1	0	2	1	2	0	8
Mary-Anne Arsenault 🔨	1	0	2	0	3	0	2	0	0	0	1	9

Sheet 4	1	2	3	4	5	6	7	8	9	10	11	Final
Anne Dillon	1	0	1	0	1	1	0	0	2	1	2	9
Mary-Sue Radford 🔨	0	3	0	1	0	0	1	2	0	0	0	7

=== Draw 7 ===
Saturday, January 11, 9:00 am

Sheet 1	1	2	3	4	5	6	7	8	9	10	11	Final
Mary-Sue Radford 🔨	1	0	1	0	0	0	1	0	1	1	0	5
Tanya Hilliard	0	2	0	1	0	2	0	0	0	0	1	6

Sheet 2	1	2	3	4	5	6	7	8	9	10	Final
Jocelyn Nix 🔨	0	0	1	0	0	1	0	0	2	0	4
Sarah Rhyno	0	1	0	1	0	0	0	1	0	2	5

Sheet 3	1	2	3	4	5	6	7	8	9	10	11	Final
Heather Smith	0	0	1	0	0	0	1	0	2	0	1	5
Mary-Anne Arsenault 🔨	0	0	0	1	0	0	0	2	0	1	0	4

Sheet 4	1	2	3	4	5	6	7	8	9	10	Final
Kelly MacIntosh 🔨	0	0	0	1	0	2	3	0	0	X	6
Anne Dillon	0	0	0	0	3	0	0	1	1	X	5

== Playoffs ==
Semifinal			Final
			1	Heather Smith	6
2	Kelly MacIntosh	9	2	Kelly MacIntosh	3
3	Mary-Anne Arsenault	8

=== Semifinal ===
Saturday, January 11, 7:00 pm

Team	1	2	3	4	5	6	7	8	9	10	11	Final
Kelly MacIntosh 🔨	3	1	1	0	1	0	1	0	1	0	1	9
Mary-Anne Arsenault	0	0	0	1	0	3	0	2	0	2	0	8

=== Final ===
Sunday, January 12, 2:00 pm

Team	1	2	3	4	5	6	7	8	9	10	Final
Heather Smith 🔨	0	1	0	0	0	2	0	0	0	3	6
Kelly MacIntosh	0	0	0	1	0	0	0	2	0	0	3

2014 Nova Scotia Scotties Tournament of Hearts

Heather Smith
5th Nova Scotia Provincial Championship title
