= 2026 Newfoundland and Labrador Women's Curling Championship =

Canadian provincial women's curling championship

- Host city: St. John's, Newfoundland and Labrador
- Arena: RE/MAX Centre
- Dates: January 2–6
- Winner: Team Mitchell
- Curling club: RE/MAX Centre, St. John's
- Skip: Mackenzie Mitchell
- Third: Jessica Wiseman
- Second: Kristina Adams
- Lead: Stacie Curtis
- Coach: Leslie Ann Walsh
- Finalist: Cailey Locke

The 2026 Newfoundland and Labrador Women's Curling Championship was held from January 2 to 6 at the RE/MAX Centre in St. John's, Newfoundland and Labrador. The winning Mackenzie Mitchell rink will represent Newfoundland and Labrador at the 2026 Scotties Tournament of Hearts in Mississauga, Ontario.

The field of eight marked the most teams registered for the event in recent history with the seven-team field in 2018 being the recent highest.

== Teams ==
The teams are listed as follows:

Skip	Third	Second	Lead	Alternate	Coach	Club
Sarah Boland	Kelli Sharpe	Beth Hamilton	Adrienne Mercer	Laura Strong	Heather Martin	RE/MAX Centre, St. John's
Kelly Cribb	Donna Walsh	Desirae Bellisle	Joy Hart	Megan Blandford	Anthony Paul	RE/MAX Centre, St. John's
Wendy Dunne	Marcie Brown	Kathy Coles	Robyn Edwards			Carol CC, Labrador City
Brooke Godsland	Sarah McNeil Lamswood	Camille Burt	Erin Porter	Emily Neary	Cory Schuh	RE/MAX Centre, St. John's
Cailey Locke	Hayley Gushue	Sitaye Penney	Sarah Thomas		Jeff Thomas	RE/MAX Centre, St. John's
Mackenzie Mitchell	Jessica Wiseman	Kristina Adams	Stacie Curtis		Leslie Anne Walsh	RE/MAX Centre, St. John's
Rebecca Roberts	Jennifer Glasgow	Mackenzie Dinn	Heidi Trickett	Cathy Rogers	Dave Trickett	RE/MAX Centre, St. John's
Krista Crowther (Fourth)	Sarah Day	Carrie Vautour (Skip)	Noelle Thomas-Kennell	Erica Curtis	Rob Thomas	RE/MAX Centre, St. John's

== Round robin standings ==
Final Round Robin Standings

Key
Teams to Playoffs
Teams to Tiebreaker

Skip	W	L	W–L	PF	PA	EW	EL	BE	SE
Cailey Locke	7	0	–	59	26	33	20	3	13
Sarah Boland	6	1	–	66	24	35	17	4	15
Brooke Godsland	4	3	1–1 (Note: Teams Brooke Godsland and Mackenzie Mitchell advanced to the tiebreaker game over Team Carrie Vautour on last stone draw (LSD) distance.)	46	36	26	30	5	6
Mackenzie Mitchell	4	3	1–1	48	47	28	25	0	10
Carrie Vautour	4	3	1–1	48	40	27	26	1	8
Wendy Dunne	2	5	–	46	51	25	25	6	9
Rebecca Roberts	1	6	–	25	64	17	28	1	4
Kelly Cribb	0	7	–	17	67	11	31	3	1

== Round robin results ==
All draw times are listed in Newfoundland Time (UTC−03:30).

=== Draw 1 ===
Friday, January 2, 1:00 pm

Sheet 2	1	2	3	4	5	6	7	8	9	10	Final
Mackenzie Mitchell	0	0	0	1	0	2	1	0	0	X	4
Cailey Locke	0	0	3	0	4	0	0	1	2	X	10

Sheet 3	1	2	3	4	5	6	7	8	9	10	11	Final
Wendy Dunne	1	1	0	0	1	0	1	1	0	2	0	7
Brooke Godsland	0	0	0	3	0	2	0	0	2	0	1	8

Sheet 4	1	2	3	4	5	6	7	8	9	10	Final
Kelly Cribb	0	1	0	0	1	0	0	X	X	X	2
Sarah Boland	1	0	3	2	0	2	3	X	X	X	11

Sheet 5	1	2	3	4	5	6	7	8	9	10	Final
Rebecca Roberts	0	1	0	0	1	2	0	1	0	X	5
Carrie Vautour	0	0	3	2	0	0	1	0	3	X	9

=== Draw 2 ===
Friday, January 2, 6:30 pm

Sheet 2	1	2	3	4	5	6	7	8	9	10	Final
Wendy Dunne	1	0	0	0	3	0	1	0	0	X	5
Sarah Boland	0	4	1	0	0	2	0	2	4	X	13

Sheet 3	1	2	3	4	5	6	7	8	9	10	Final
Mackenzie Mitchell	0	1	2	0	0	1	0	0	X	X	4
Carrie Vautour	1	0	0	3	2	0	3	1	X	X	10

Sheet 4	1	2	3	4	5	6	7	8	9	10	Final
Rebecca Roberts	1	0	0	0	0	2	0	X	X	X	3
Cailey Locke	0	3	2	1	2	0	2	X	X	X	10

Sheet 5	1	2	3	4	5	6	7	8	9	10	Final
Kelly Cribb	0	1	0	0	1	0	X	X	X	X	2
Brooke Godsland	1	0	4	3	0	2	X	X	X	X	10

=== Draw 3 ===
Saturday, January 3, 1:00 pm

Sheet 2	1	2	3	4	5	6	7	8	9	10	Final
Rebecca Roberts	1	0	1	0	0	0	2	0	3	1	8
Kelly Cribb	0	2	0	0	0	2	0	2	0	0	6

Sheet 3	1	2	3	4	5	6	7	8	9	10	11	Final
Cailey Locke	0	1	0	3	0	2	0	0	1	0	1	8
Sarah Boland	1	0	1	0	2	0	0	2	0	1	0	7

Sheet 4	1	2	3	4	5	6	7	8	9	10	Final
Carrie Vautour	0	0	1	0	1	0	0	1	0	X	3
Brooke Godsland	0	2	0	0	0	1	1	0	3	X	7

Sheet 5	1	2	3	4	5	6	7	8	9	10	Final
Mackenzie Mitchell	1	0	0	0	2	0	2	0	3	2	10
Wendy Dunne	0	0	0	1	0	1	0	5	0	0	7

=== Draw 4 ===
Saturday, January 3, 6:30 pm

Sheet 2	1	2	3	4	5	6	7	8	9	10	Final
Sarah Boland	0	1	1	0	1	1	3	0	1	2	10
Brooke Godsland	1	0	0	2	0	0	0	1	0	0	4

Sheet 3	1	2	3	4	5	6	7	8	9	10	Final
Rebecca Roberts	0	0	3	1	0	1	0	X	X	X	5
Mackenzie Mitchell	4	3	0	0	3	0	3	X	X	X	13

Sheet 4	1	2	3	4	5	6	7	8	9	10	Final
Wendy Dunne	0	0	3	3	3	1	X	X	X	X	10
Kelly Cribb	2	0	0	0	0	0	X	X	X	X	2

Sheet 5	1	2	3	4	5	6	7	8	9	10	11	Final
Carrie Vautour	1	0	0	1	0	1	0	1	0	2	0	6
Cailey Locke	0	1	1	0	2	0	1	0	1	0	1	7

=== Draw 5 ===
Sunday, January 4, 9:00 am

Sheet 2	1	2	3	4	5	6	7	8	9	10	Final
Kelly Cribb	1	0	0	0	0	0	0	X	X	X	1
Mackenzie Mitchell	0	1	1	1	1	0	3	X	X	X	7

Sheet 3	1	2	3	4	5	6	7	8	9	10	Final
Brooke Godsland	1	1	0	0	1	0	0	0	0	X	3
Cailey Locke	0	0	0	1	0	1	1	2	1	X	6

Sheet 4	1	2	3	4	5	6	7	8	9	10	Final
Sarah Boland	2	0	4	0	2	1	X	X	X	X	9
Carrie Vautour	0	0	0	1	0	0	X	X	X	X	1

Sheet 5	1	2	3	4	5	6	7	8	9	10	Final
Wendy Dunne	2	2	3	0	3	X	X	X	X	X	10
Rebecca Roberts	0	0	0	2	0	X	X	X	X	X	2

=== Draw 6 ===
Sunday, January 4, 2:15 pm

Sheet 2	1	2	3	4	5	6	7	8	9	10	Final
Brooke Godsland	0	0	2	0	4	1	1	X	X	X	8
Rebecca Roberts	0	0	0	1	0	0	0	X	X	X	1

Sheet 3	1	2	3	4	5	6	7	8	9	10	Final
Carrie Vautour	2	1	0	2	0	6	X	X	X	X	11
Kelly Cribb	0	0	2	0	2	0	X	X	X	X	4

Sheet 4	1	2	3	4	5	6	7	8	9	10	Final
Cailey Locke	0	2	0	0	2	0	2	2	X	X	8
Wendy Dunne	2	0	0	0	0	1	0	0	X	X	3

Sheet 5	1	2	3	4	5	6	7	8	9	10	Final
Sarah Boland	0	0	0	0	1	0	2	1	1	3	8
Mackenzie Mitchell	2	0	0	0	0	1	0	0	0	0	3

=== Draw 7 ===
Monday, January 5, 2:00 pm

Sheet 2	1	2	3	4	5	6	7	8	9	10	Final
Carrie Vautour	2	2	1	0	0	2	0	1	X	X	8
Wendy Dunne	0	0	0	2	1	0	1	0	X	X	4

Sheet 3	1	2	3	4	5	6	7	8	9	10	Final
Sarah Boland	3	0	2	1	2	X	X	X	X	X	8
Rebecca Roberts	0	1	0	0	0	X	X	X	X	X	1

Sheet 4	1	2	3	4	5	6	7	8	9	10	Final
Brooke Godsland	0	0	1	0	2	0	1	0	2	0	6
Mackenzie Mitchell	1	1	0	1	0	1	0	1	0	2	7

Sheet 5	1	2	3	4	5	6	7	8	9	10	Final
Cailey Locke	1	2	4	3	X	X	X	X	X	X	10
Kelly Cribb	0	0	0	0	X	X	X	X	X	X	0

== Tiebreaker ==
Monday, January 5, 7:30 pm

Sheet 3	1	2	3	4	5	6	7	8	9	10	Final
Brooke Godsland	0	0	1	0	2	0	1	2	0	0	6
Mackenzie Mitchell	0	2	0	1	0	3	0	0	2	1	9

== Playoffs ==
Semifinal			Final
			1	Cailey Locke	7
2	Sarah Boland	5	3	Mackenzie Mitchell	8
3	Mackenzie Mitchell	7

=== Semifinal ===
Tuesday, January 6, 9:00 am

Sheet 4	1	2	3	4	5	6	7	8	9	10	Final
Sarah Boland	0	1	0	0	0	2	0	0	2	0	5
Mackenzie Mitchell	1	0	0	2	1	0	1	1	0	1	7

=== Final ===
Tuesday, January 6, 2:15 pm

Sheet 4	1	2	3	4	5	6	7	8	9	10	Final
Cailey Locke	0	1	0	2	0	2	0	0	2	0	7
Mackenzie Mitchell	1	0	1	0	1	0	1	2	0	2	8

2026 Newfoundland & Labrador Women's Curling Championship
(Newfoundland and Labrador)
Mackenzie Mitchell
1st Newfoundland & Labrador Provincial Championship title
