= 2024 Nova Scotia Scotties Tournament of Hearts =

Canadian women's curling tournament

- Host city: Halifax, Nova Scotia
- Arena: Halifax Curling Club
- Dates: January 17-21
- Winner: Team Smith
- Curling club: Halifax CC, Halifax
- Skip: Heather Smith
- Fourth: Jill Brothers
- Second: Marie Christianson
- Lead: Erin Carmody
- Alternate: Taylour Stevens
- Coach: Colleen Jones
- Finalist: Christina Black

The 2024 Nova Scotia Scotties Tournament of Hearts, the provincial women's curling championship for Nova Scotia, was held from January 17 to 21 at the Halifax Curling Club in Halifax, Nova Scotia. The winning Heather Smith rink will represent Nova Scotia at the 2024 Scotties Tournament of Hearts in Calgary, Alberta. The event was held in conjunction with the 2024 Ocean Contractors Tankard the men's provincial championship.

An open qualifier was initially scheduled but later cancelled due to only 8 teams registering.

== Teams ==
The teams are listed as follows.

| Skip | Third | Second | Lead | Alternate | Coach | Club |
|---|---|---|---|---|---|---|
| Jocelyn Adams-Moss | Amanda England | Heather MacPhee | Emily Manuel | | Andrew Simpson | Halifax CC, Halifax |
| Christina Black | Jenn Baxter | Karlee Everist | Shelley Barker | Carole MacLean | Stuart MacLean | Halifax CC, Halifax |
| Jessica Daigle | Marlee Powers | Lindsey Burgess | Katie Vandenborre | | Kevin Ouellette | Halifax CC, Halifax |
| Tanya Hilliard | Kelly Backman | Taylor Clarke | Mackenzie Feindel | | Paul Hilliard | Dartmouth CC, Dartmouth |
| Kristen MacDiarmid | Kristen Lind | Liz Woodworth | Julia Colter | | Chris Jeffrey | Halifax CC, Halifax |
| Allyson MacNutt | Maria Fitzgerald | Alison Umlah | Grace McCusker | | Theresa Breen | Halifax CC, Halifax |
| Mackenzie Mitchell | Kate Callaghan | Sarah Chaytor | Cate Fitzgerald | | Mike Callaghan | Halifax CC, Halifax |
| Jill Brothers (Fourth) | Heather Smith (Skip) | Marie Christianson | Erin Carmody | Taylour Stevens | Colleen Jones | Halifax CC, Halifax |

== Knockout brackets ==
=== A event ===
First Knockout | Qualifier 1
Christina Black | 11
Allyson MacNutt | 4
Christina Black | 9
Kristen MacDiarmid | 4
Kristen MacDiarmid | 8
Tanya Hilliard | 6
Christina Black | 9
Jessica Daigle | 4
Jessica Daigle | 8
Mackenzie Mitchell | 7
Jessica Daigle | 8
Jocelyn Adams-Moss | 7
Heather Smith | 5
Jocelyn Adams-Moss | 6

=== B event ===
Second Knockout | Qualifier 2
Jocelyn Adams-Moss | 3
Allyson MacNutt | 5 | Tanya Hilliard | 8 | Jessica Daigle | 3
Tanya Hilliard | 7 | Tanya Hilliard | 3 | Heather Smith | 8
Heather Smith | 5
Kristen MacDiarmid | 2
Mackenzie Mitchell | 2 | Heather Smith | 7
Heather Smith | 10

=== C event ===
| Third Knockout | | Qualifier 3 |
| | | Jessica Daigle | 6 |
| Mackenzie Mitchell | 7 | Mackenzie Mitchell | 8 |
| Jocelyn Adams-Moss | 3 |

| Third Knockout | | Qualifier 4 |
| | | Tanya Hilliard | 12 |
| Allyson MacNutt | 5 | Kristen MacDiarmid | 5 |
| Kristen MacDiarmid | 6 |

== Knockout results ==
All draw times listed in Atlantic Time (UTC−04:00).

=== Draw 1 ===
Wednesday, January 17, 2:00 pm

| Sheet 2 | 1 | 2 | 3 | 4 | 5 | 6 | 7 | 8 | 9 | 10 | Final |
|---|---|---|---|---|---|---|---|---|---|---|---|
| Christina Black | 3 | 1 | 0 | 2 | 1 | 0 | 1 | 0 | 3 | X | 11 |
| Allyson MacNutt | 0 | 0 | 1 | 0 | 0 | 1 | 0 | 2 | 0 | X | 4 |

| Sheet 4 | 1 | 2 | 3 | 4 | 5 | 6 | 7 | 8 | 9 | 10 | Final |
|---|---|---|---|---|---|---|---|---|---|---|---|
| Kristen MacDiarmid | 1 | 0 | 0 | 2 | 0 | 0 | 2 | 0 | 0 | 3 | 8 |
| Tanya Hilliard | 0 | 1 | 1 | 0 | 0 | 2 | 0 | 1 | 1 | 0 | 6 |

=== Draw 2 ===
Wednesday, January 17, 7:00 pm

| Sheet 1 | 1 | 2 | 3 | 4 | 5 | 6 | 7 | 8 | 9 | 10 | 11 | Final |
|---|---|---|---|---|---|---|---|---|---|---|---|---|
| Heather Smith | 0 | 0 | 1 | 1 | 0 | 0 | 1 | 1 | 0 | 1 | 0 | 5 |
| Jocelyn Adams-Moss | 0 | 1 | 0 | 0 | 1 | 2 | 0 | 0 | 1 | 0 | 1 | 6 |

| Sheet 2 | 1 | 2 | 3 | 4 | 5 | 6 | 7 | 8 | 9 | 10 | Final |
|---|---|---|---|---|---|---|---|---|---|---|---|
| Jessica Daigle | 0 | 1 | 0 | 3 | 0 | 0 | 0 | 4 | 0 | 0 | 8 |
| Mackenzie Mitchell | 0 | 0 | 1 | 0 | 1 | 1 | 2 | 0 | 1 | 1 | 7 |

=== Draw 3 ===
Thursday, January 18, 9:00 am

| Sheet 8 | 1 | 2 | 3 | 4 | 5 | 6 | 7 | 8 | 9 | 10 | 11 | Final |
|---|---|---|---|---|---|---|---|---|---|---|---|---|
| Allyson MacNutt | 1 | 0 | 0 | 0 | 1 | 2 | 0 | 1 | 0 | 0 | 0 | 5 |
| Tanya Hilliard | 0 | 1 | 2 | 0 | 0 | 0 | 1 | 0 | 0 | 1 | 2 | 7 |

| Sheet 4 | 1 | 2 | 3 | 4 | 5 | 6 | 7 | 8 | 9 | 10 | Final |
|---|---|---|---|---|---|---|---|---|---|---|---|
| Mackenzie Mitchell | 0 | 0 | 0 | 1 | 1 | 0 | 0 | 0 | X | X | 2 |
| Heather Smith | 1 | 3 | 2 | 0 | 0 | 2 | 1 | 1 | X | X | 10 |

=== Draw 4 ===
Thursday, January 18, 2:00 pm

| Sheet 1 | 1 | 2 | 3 | 4 | 5 | 6 | 7 | 8 | 9 | 10 | Final |
|---|---|---|---|---|---|---|---|---|---|---|---|
| Christina Black | 2 | 0 | 2 | 0 | 1 | 2 | 0 | 0 | 2 | X | 9 |
| Kristen MacDiarmid | 0 | 1 | 0 | 1 | 0 | 0 | 1 | 1 | 0 | X | 4 |

| Sheet 8 | 1 | 2 | 3 | 4 | 5 | 6 | 7 | 8 | 9 | 10 | 11 | Final |
|---|---|---|---|---|---|---|---|---|---|---|---|---|
| Jessica Daigle | 0 | 1 | 0 | 0 | 1 | 1 | 0 | 3 | 0 | 1 | 1 | 8 |
| Jocelyn Adams-Moss | 1 | 0 | 1 | 2 | 0 | 0 | 2 | 0 | 1 | 0 | 0 | 7 |

=== Draw 5 ===
Thursday, January 18, 7:00 pm

| Sheet 8 | 1 | 2 | 3 | 4 | 5 | 6 | 7 | 8 | 9 | 10 | Final |
|---|---|---|---|---|---|---|---|---|---|---|---|
| Kristen MacDiarmid | 0 | 0 | 0 | 0 | 0 | 1 | 0 | 1 | 0 | X | 2 |
| Heather Smith | 0 | 0 | 0 | 0 | 1 | 0 | 2 | 0 | 4 | X | 7 |

| Sheet 4 | 1 | 2 | 3 | 4 | 5 | 6 | 7 | 8 | 9 | 10 | Final |
|---|---|---|---|---|---|---|---|---|---|---|---|
| Jocelyn Adams-Moss | 0 | 2 | 0 | 0 | 0 | 0 | 1 | 0 | X | X | 3 |
| Tanya Hilliard | 1 | 0 | 2 | 1 | 1 | 2 | 0 | 1 | X | X | 8 |

=== Draw 6 ===
Friday, January 19, 9:00 am

| Sheet 2 | 1 | 2 | 3 | 4 | 5 | 6 | 7 | 8 | 9 | 10 | Final |
|---|---|---|---|---|---|---|---|---|---|---|---|
| Tanya Hilliard | 0 | 1 | 0 | 0 | 0 | 1 | 0 | 1 | 0 | 0 | 3 |
| Heather Smith | 0 | 0 | 0 | 1 | 0 | 0 | 2 | 0 | 0 | 2 | 5 |

| Sheet 4 | 1 | 2 | 3 | 4 | 5 | 6 | 7 | 8 | 9 | 10 | Final |
|---|---|---|---|---|---|---|---|---|---|---|---|
| Allyson MacNutt | 0 | 0 | 0 | 1 | 1 | 0 | 2 | 1 | 0 | 0 | 5 |
| Kristen MacDiarmid | 1 | 0 | 1 | 0 | 0 | 2 | 0 | 0 | 1 | 1 | 6 |

=== Draw 7 ===
Friday, January 19, 2:00 pm

| Sheet 1 | 1 | 2 | 3 | 4 | 5 | 6 | 7 | 8 | 9 | 10 | Final |
|---|---|---|---|---|---|---|---|---|---|---|---|
| Mackenzie Mitchell | 0 | 2 | 0 | 2 | 0 | 1 | 1 | 0 | 1 | X | 7 |
| Jocelyn Adams-Moss | 0 | 0 | 1 | 0 | 1 | 0 | 0 | 1 | 0 | X | 3 |

| Sheet 2 | 1 | 2 | 3 | 4 | 5 | 6 | 7 | 8 | 9 | 10 | Final |
|---|---|---|---|---|---|---|---|---|---|---|---|
| Christina Black | 2 | 3 | 0 | 2 | 0 | 2 | 0 | X | X | X | 9 |
| Jessica Daigle | 0 | 0 | 1 | 0 | 2 | 0 | 1 | X | X | X | 4 |

=== Draw 8 ===
Friday, January 19, 7:00 pm

| Sheet 2 | 1 | 2 | 3 | 4 | 5 | 6 | 7 | 8 | 9 | 10 | Final |
|---|---|---|---|---|---|---|---|---|---|---|---|
| Jessica Daigle | 1 | 0 | 1 | 0 | 0 | 0 | 1 | X | X | X | 3 |
| Heather Smith | 0 | 2 | 0 | 2 | 2 | 2 | 0 | X | X | X | 8 |

=== Draw 9 ===
Saturday, January 20, 9:00 am

| Sheet 1 | 1 | 2 | 3 | 4 | 5 | 6 | 7 | 8 | 9 | 10 | Final |
|---|---|---|---|---|---|---|---|---|---|---|---|
| Tanya Hilliard | 0 | 0 | 1 | 1 | 0 | 5 | 2 | 0 | 3 | X | 12 |
| Kristen MacDiarmid | 0 | 1 | 0 | 0 | 3 | 0 | 0 | 1 | 0 | X | 5 |

| Sheet 8 | 1 | 2 | 3 | 4 | 5 | 6 | 7 | 8 | 9 | 10 | 11 | Final |
|---|---|---|---|---|---|---|---|---|---|---|---|---|
| Jessica Daigle | 0 | 2 | 0 | 0 | 0 | 2 | 1 | 0 | 0 | 1 | 0 | 6 |
| Mackenzie Mitchell | 1 | 0 | 0 | 2 | 1 | 0 | 0 | 2 | 0 | 0 | 2 | 8 |

== Playoffs ==
Page playoff system
1 | Christina Black | 3
2 | Heather Smith | 7
3 | Mackenzie Mitchell | 8
4 | Tanya Hilliard | 7

Semifinal
1 | Christina Black | 11
3 | Mackenzie Mitchell | 7

Final
2 | Heather Smith | 6
1 | Christina Black | 4

=== 1 vs. 2 ===
Saturday, January 20, 7:00 pm

| Sheet 2 | 1 | 2 | 3 | 4 | 5 | 6 | 7 | 8 | 9 | 10 | Final |
|---|---|---|---|---|---|---|---|---|---|---|---|
| Christina Black | 0 | 0 | 1 | 1 | 0 | 0 | 0 | 1 | 0 | 0 | 3 |
| Heather Smith | 0 | 0 | 0 | 0 | 1 | 1 | 2 | 0 | 2 | 1 | 7 |

=== 3 vs. 4 ===
Saturday, January 20, 2:00 pm

| Sheet 2 | 1 | 2 | 3 | 4 | 5 | 6 | 7 | 8 | 9 | 10 | Final |
|---|---|---|---|---|---|---|---|---|---|---|---|
| Mackenzie Mitchell | 0 | 1 | 0 | 1 | 0 | 2 | 0 | 2 | 1 | 1 | 8 |
| Tanya Hilliard | 0 | 0 | 4 | 0 | 1 | 0 | 2 | 0 | 0 | 0 | 7 |

=== Semifinal ===
Sunday, January 21, 9:00 am

| Sheet 2 | 1 | 2 | 3 | 4 | 5 | 6 | 7 | 8 | 9 | 10 | Final |
|---|---|---|---|---|---|---|---|---|---|---|---|
| Christina Black | 0 | 2 | 0 | 3 | 0 | 2 | 0 | 1 | 1 | 2 | 11 |
| Mackenzie Mitchell | 0 | 0 | 2 | 0 | 2 | 0 | 3 | 0 | 0 | 0 | 7 |

=== Final ===
Sunday, January 21, 2:00 pm

| Sheet 2 | 1 | 2 | 3 | 4 | 5 | 6 | 7 | 8 | 9 | 10 | Final |
|---|---|---|---|---|---|---|---|---|---|---|---|
| Heather Smith | 0 | 0 | 1 | 0 | 2 | 0 | 1 | 0 | 0 | 2 | 6 |
| Christina Black | 0 | 1 | 0 | 1 | 0 | 1 | 0 | 1 | 0 | 0 | 4 |

2024 Nova Scotia Scotties Tournament of Hearts

Heather Smith
6th Nova Scotia Provincial Championship title
