= Christina Black =

Canadian curler (born 1987)

- Curler
- Born: October 21, 1987 (age 39); Sydney, Nova Scotia

Team
- Curling club: Halifax CC, Halifax, NS
- Skip: Christina Black
- Third: Jill Brothers
- Second: Marlee Powers
- Lead: Lindsey Burgess
- Alternate: Karlee Everist

Curling career
- Member Association: Nova Scotia
- Hearts: 7 (2015, 2018, 2020, 2022, 2023, 2025, 2026)
- Top CTRS ranking: 4th (2024–25)
Medal record
Representing Nova Scotia
Canadian Olympic Curling Trials
Silver medal – second place	2025 Halifax
Scotties Tournament of Hearts
Bronze medal – third place	2018 Penticton
Bronze medal – third place	2025 Thunder Bay
Canadian Mixed Curling Championship
Silver medal – second place	2013 Mount Royal
Gold medal – first place	2024 St. Catharines

Christina Black (born October 21, 1987) is a Canadian curler from Halifax, Nova Scotia. She currently skips her own team out of the Halifax Curling Club.

== Career ==
=== Women's ===
Black represented Saint Mary's University in the Canadian Interuniversity Sport/Canadian Curling Association University Curling Championships in 2009 and 2010. In the 2009 tournament, she played second on a Huskies rink skipped by Sarah Rhyno. They finished in second place in Pool A in the round-robin with a 5-2 record and beat Laurentian University 6-5 in the semifinal, but lost to Hollie Nicol and the Wilfrid Laurier Golden Hawks in the final 6-4, claiming the silver medal. In 2010, the Huskies were skipped by Marie Christianson, and Black played third. They finished first in Pool D with a 4-1 record, then beat Brock University 8-5 in the semifinal before dropping the final to Brooklyn Lemon and her University of Regina Cougars 6-5 in an extra end, winning the silver medal again.

Black joined Team Mary-Anne Arsenault for the 2014–15 season at third. The team, along with second Jane Snyder and lead Jennifer Baxter, won two tour events early in the season, the Dave Jones Molson Mayflower Cashspiel and the Gibson's Cashspiel. They also won the 2015 Nova Scotia Scotties Tournament of Hearts, qualifying them for the 2015 Scotties Tournament of Hearts, Black's first. There, the team finished in seventh place with a 5–6 record. In 2016, Jennifer Crouse joined as second when Snyder left the team. A few seasons later, they won the 2018 Nova Scotia Scotties Tournament of Hearts and won a bronze medal at the 2018 Scotties Tournament of Hearts. Later that year, the team won the 2018 New Scotland Clothing Ladies Cashspiel.

The Arsenault rink began the 2019–20 season by winning the 2019 Curling Store Cashspiel. The team won the provincial Scotties again in 2020, and represented Nova Scotia at the 2020 Scotties Tournament of Hearts with new lead Emma Logan. The team finished pool play with a 4–3 round-robin record, tied with British Columbia's Corryn Brown rink. They lost to British Columbia in a tiebreaker and failed to advance.

In 2020, Arsenault announced she was moving to British Columbia. Black formed a new rink as skip with Baxter at third and front end Karlee Jones and Shelley Barker. In their first event together, the team won the 2020 Curling Store Cashspiel. The 2021 Nova Scotia Scotties was cancelled due to the COVID-19 pandemic in Nova Scotia, so the Nova Scotia Curling Association appointed Team Jill Brothers to represent the province at the 2021 Scotties Tournament of Hearts. Team Black would have been selected as the Nova Scotia representatives, however, they did not retain three out of their four players from the previous season.

Team Black won their first event of the 2021–22 season, The Curling Store Cashspiel, going undefeated to claim the title. They also reached the final of the Atlantic Superstore Monctonian Challenge, losing to the Andrea Crawford rink. In November, the team once again went undefeated to win the Tim Hortons Spitfire Arms Cash Spiel, defeating former teammate Jennifer Crouse in the final. At the 2022 Nova Scotia Scotties Tournament of Hearts, Team Black won all three qualifying events, winning the provincial title and securing their spot at the 2022 Scotties Tournament of Hearts. At the Hearts, Black led her rink to a 5–3 record in the round robin, which was enough to qualify for the championship round. Along the way, she scored victories over higher-seeded teams such as Alberta's Laura Walker and Manitoba's Mackenzie Zacharias. She also defeated British Columbia, which was skipped by her former teammate Mary-Anne Arsenault. In their championship round match against Northern Ontario's Krista McCarville, Team Black got down 9–1 before coming back to make the game 9–8, eventually losing 11–8. This eliminated them from the championship.

The Black rink began the 2022–23 season at the inaugural PointsBet Invitational, where they lost to Kelsey Rocque in the opening round. They bounced back immediately in their next event, however, winning the New Scotland Clothing Women's Cashspiel in a 6–4 final over Tanya Hilliard. At the 2022 Tour Challenge Tier 2 Grand Slam of Curling event, the team went undefeated until the semifinals where they were defeated by Jessie Hunkin. Through November and December, they qualified for three straight finals. After losing to the Kaitlyn Lawes rink, skipped by Selena Njegovan, in the final of the 2022 Stu Sells 1824 Halifax Classic, they once again defeated Jennifer Crouse at the Tim Hortons Spitfire Arms Cash Spiel and then beat Marlee Powers in the final of the Bogside Cup. At the 2023 Nova Scotia Scotties Tournament of Hearts, Team Black won both the A and B events to earn two of the three spots in the playoffs. They then beat the Hilliard rink 9–4 in the semifinals to claim their second consecutive Nova Scotia Scotties title. This qualified the team for the 2023 Scotties Tournament of Hearts in Kamloops, British Columbia where they again went 5–3 through the round robin. This qualified them for a tiebreaker where they stole in an extra end to upset the Lawes Wild Card rink. In the championship round, they again stole in an extra to beat Ontario's Rachel Homan rink before losing to Northern Ontario's McCarville in the seeding game. They then fell 9–4 to Team Canada's Kerri Einarson in the 3 vs. 4 game, settling for fourth.

The 2023–24 season began well for Team Black as they reached the final of the Summer Series, losing 5–4 to Danielle Inglis. In their third event, they reached another final where they narrowly lost to Jessica Daigle. With their success from the previous season, the team qualified as the sixth seeds for the 2023 PointsBet Invitational. After defeating Nancy Martin in the opening round, they upset Jennifer Jones in the quarterfinals before dropping the semifinal to Rachel Homan. In their next two events, the team reached the quarterfinals of both the 2023 Tour Challenge Tier 2 and the Stu Sells 1824 Halifax Classic, losing out to Madeleine Dupont and Stefania Constantini respectively. In November 2023, the team ranked sixteenth in the world, qualifying them for the 2023 National Tier 1 Slam. They finished with a 1–3 record, earning a victory over Korea's Ha Seung-youn. At the 2024 Nova Scotia Scotties Tournament of Hearts, the team easily qualified for the playoffs through the A event. They then lost to Heather Smith in the 1 vs. 2 game but defeated Mackenzie Mitchell in the semifinal to reach the final. There, they could not defend their provincial title for a third time, dropping the final 6–4 to Team Smith. After the season, the team's lead Shelley Barker retired from competitive women's play. The team then added Jill Brothers and Marlee Powers for the 2024–25 season. The revised lineup featured Brothers at third, with Baxter and Everist moving to second and lead, respectively. Powers was named the alternate but rotates with Baxter at second. The team had success in their first season together, winning the Tier 2 event of the 2024 Tour Challenge, qualifying them for the 2024 National Grand Slam, where they lost in the Quarterfinals to Anna Hasselborg. Black would also go on to win the 2025 NS Women's Championship, beating clubmate Mackenzie Mitchell in the final, qualifying the team to represent Nova Scotia at the 2025 Scotties Tournament of Hearts. At the 2025 Scotties, Black finished 2nd in Pool B with a 6–2 record, and would make it to the semifinals, where she lost to Kerri Einarson 9–8 after a measurement in the 10th end, winning a bronze medal for Nova Scotia.

Team Black finished the 2024–25 season at number four in the Canadian Team Ranking System rankings, which earned them a pre-qualifier berth in the Scotties Tournament of Hearts, and they also prequalified for the 2025 Canadian Olympic Curling Trials based on cumulative CTRS points from 2023 to 2025. As a result, they were able to primarily focus their efforts in 2025-26 on travelling to Tier 1 and Tier 2 events outside Nova Scotia, where they could play against tougher competition and gain valuable experience. Their first major event was the 2025 AMJ Masters in London, ON, where they went 2–2 in the round-robin, missing the quarterfinals by a point. Next up for them was the 2025 PointsBet Invitational in Calgary; the seven teams that had prequalified for the Olympic Trials were automatically invited; they went 1–3 in this event, again missing the playoffs. A couple of weeks later, they flew back to Alberta for the CO-OP Tour Challenge in Nisku and fared even worse with an 0–4 record. Black said that despite their cumulative record, she considered these three events to have been “a great opportunity” and “really good practice.” In November, Team Black participated in the 2025 Canadian Olympic Curling Trials in their hometown of Halifax, where they would finish round-robin play in 3rd place with a 4–3 record. They would go on to beat Kerri Einarson 6–3 in the semifinals but would ultimately lose both games to Rachel Homan in the best-of-three final by 5-4 and 12-3 scores, claiming the silver medal. They went on the road one more time before the end of 2025, appearing at the 2025 HearingLife Canadian Open Tier 2 Division in Martensville, SK, which they qualified for based on their World Curling team ranking (#15). Their record at the Open was 2-2; they qualified for the quarterfinals, where they beat Isabella Wranå 7-1 and then fell to Kaitlyn Lawes in the semifinal 8–3. The last event on Team Black's calendar for the 2025–26 season was the 2026 Scotties Tournament of Hearts in Mississauga, ON. They finished second in Pool B with a 6–2 record, but struggled in the playoffs, losing to Manitoba's Lawes in the 1/2 qualifier game 8–6, defeating fellow Nova Scotian Taylour Stevens 11–6 in the 3/4 qualifier game, then falling in the Page 3/4 game to Alberta's Selena Sturmay 8–4. Team Black participated in some smaller events earlier in the season as well, making the semifinals at the Asham Ice Breaker Challenge in Morris, MB after finishing pool play with a 3–1 record, missing the playoffs at the 2025 AMJ Campbell Shorty Jenkins Classic in Cornwall, ON after a 2-3 round-robin, and won the 2025 Stu Sells 1824 Halifax Classic, finishing 4–1 in the round-robin and defeating Danielle Inglis in the final 6–5. On March 16, 2026, Team Black announced that Baxter will be leaving the team and stepping away from competitive curling to focus on other important parts of her life and to spend more time with her family. The remaining members of the team were planning to continue together for the 2026-27 season, but on April 17, 2026, Everist announced that she is expecting her second child in October and that her role with the team would be changing as a result. The next day, Team Black announced that Lindsey Burgess, who had been living in Alberta and playing second for Serena Gray-Withers, would be returning to Nova Scotia, where she grew up and went to school, to take over the lead position in the 2026-27 season while Everist steps back into the alternate role. Black said that giving Burgess the lead role "will help us have a consistent lineup for the whole season, not having to change halfway through. It’s the best route to take for our year."

=== Mixed ===
Black has also represented Nova Scotia in the Canadian Mixed Curling Championship four times as a third. In 2013, she won a silver medal with Brent MacDougall as skip, finishing first in the round-robin with a 9-2 record and earning an automatic spot in the final, which they dropped to Cory Heggestad's Ontario rink 10-3. She participated but didn't medal in 2015 and 2018, also with MacDougall as skip (made placement round in both but missed playoffs) and was named the Canadian Mixed All-Star at third in the 2015 event. More recently, she won the gold medal with Owen Purcell as skip in 2024 (and Team Black second Jenn Baxter as lead), finishing second in Pool A in the round-robin with a 5-1 record, winning all four of their placement round games, then defeating both Ryan Wiebe's Manitoba team 7-4 in the semifinal and Saskatchewan's Jason Ackerman in the gold medal game 5-4. Black was named as the tournament’s female MVP.

== Personal life ==
Black was born in Sydney and attended Riverview High School. She graduated with a Bachelor of Commerce degree from Saint Mary's University in 2010, and is currently employed as an SSI Supervision Specialist for Scotiabank.

== Grand Slam record ==
Key
C	Champion
F	Lost in Final
SF	Lost in Semifinal
QF	Lost in Quarterfinals
R16	Lost in the round of 16
Q	Did not advance to playoffs
T2	Played in Tier 2 event
DNP	Did not participate in event
N/A	Not a Grand Slam event that season

Event	2015–16	2016–17	2017–18	2018–19	2019–20	2020–21	2021–22	2022–23	2023–24	2024–25	2025–26	2026–27
Invitational	T2	DNP	DNP	T2	T2	N/A	N/A	T2	T2	T2	Q	DNP
Masters	QF	DNP	DNP	DNP	DNP	N/A	DNP	DNP	DNP	DNP	Q	DNP
National	DNP	DNP	DNP	DNP	DNP	N/A	DNP	DNP	Q	QF	DNP	Q
Open	DNP	DNP	DNP	DNP	DNP	N/A	N/A	DNP	DNP	DNP	T2	DNP

== Teams ==
Black has played with the following women's curling teams:

Season	Skip	Third	Second	Lead
2010–11	Tanya Hilliard	Christina Black	Liz Woodworth	Kaitlin Fralic
2011–12	Marie Christianson	Kristen MacDiarmid	Christina Black	Jane Snyder
2012–13	Marie Christianson	Kristen MacDiarmid	Christina Black	Jane Snyder
2013–14	Christina Black (Fourth)	Jane Snyder	Katarina Danbrook	Mary Sue Radford (Skip)
2014–15	Mary-Anne Arsenault	Christina Black	Jane Snyder	Jenn Baxter
2015–16	Mary-Anne Arsenault	Christina Black	Jane Snyder	Jenn Baxter
2016–17	Mary-Anne Arsenault	Christina Black	Jennifer Crouse	Jenn Baxter
2017–18	Mary-Anne Arsenault	Christina Black	Jenn Baxter	Jennifer Crouse
2018–19	Mary-Anne Arsenault	Christina Black	Jenn Baxter	Kristin Clarke
2019–20	Mary-Anne Arsenault	Christina Black	Jenn Baxter	Emma Logan
2020–21	Christina Black	Jenn Baxter	Karlee Jones	Shelley Barker
2021–22	Christina Black	Jenn Baxter	Karlee Everist	Shelley Barker
2022–23	Christina Black	Jenn Baxter	Karlee Everist	Shelley Barker
2023–24	Christina Black	Jenn Baxter	Karlee Everist	Shelley Barker
2024–25	Christina Black	Jill Brothers	Jenn Baxter	Karlee Everist
2025–26	Christina Black	Jill Brothers	Jenn Baxter	Karlee Everist
2026–27	Christina Black	Jill Brothers	Marlee Powers	Lindsey Burgess
