= 2025 Ocean Contractors Women's Curling Championship =

Canadian provincial women's curling championship

- Host city: Halifax, Nova Scotia
- Arena: Halifax Curling Club
- Dates: January 14–19
- Winner: Team Black
- Curling club: Halifax CC, Halifax
- Skip: Christina Black
- Third: Jill Brothers
- Second: Jenn Baxter
- Lead: Karlee Everist
- Alternate: Marlee Powers
- Coach: Carole MacLean
- Finalist: Mackenzie Mitchell

The 2025 Ocean Contractors Women's Curling Championship, the provincial women's curling championship for Nova Scotia, was held from January 14 to 19 at the Halifax Curling Club in Halifax, Nova Scotia. The winning Christina Black rink represented Nova Scotia at the 2025 Scotties Tournament of Hearts in Thunder Bay, Ontario. The event was held in conjunction with the 2025 Ocean Contractors Men's Curling Championship, the provincial men's championship.

The tournament returned to a round robin format, which was last used in 2020.

== Teams ==
The teams are listed as follows:

Skip	Third	Second	Lead	Alternate	Coach	Club
Christina Black	Jill Brothers	Jenn Baxter	Karlee Everist	Marlee Powers	Stuart MacLean	Halifax CC, Halifax
Tanya Hilliard	Kelly Backman	Taylor Clarke	Mackenzie Feindel		Paul Hilliard	Dartmouth CC, Dartmouth
Kristen MacDiarmid	Kristen Lind	Liz Woodworth	Julia Colter			Halifax CC, Halifax
Allyson MacNutt	Maria Fitzgerald	Alison Umlah	Grace McCusker		Theresa Breen	Halifax CC, Halifax
Mackenzie Mitchell	Taylour Stevens	Marlise Carter	Cate Fitzgerald			Halifax CC, Halifax
Mary Myketyn-Driscoll	Emilie Proulx	Cally Moore	Amanda Skiffington		Paul Flemming	Halifax CC, Halifax
Rebecca Regan	Olivia McDonah	Rya Leonard	Ella Kinley	Heather Smith		Lakeshore CC, Lower Sackville

== Round robin standings ==
Final Round Robin Standings

Key
Teams to Playoffs

Skip	W	L	W–L	PF	PA	EW	EL	BE	SE
Christina Black	6	0	–	53	20	29	16	1	13
Mackenzie Mitchell	4	2	1–0	38	30	26	20	5	9
Allyson MacNutt	4	2	0–1	45	38	31	21	3	13
Kristen MacDiarmid	3	3	–	41	52	22	28	2	8
Rebecca Regan	2	4	–	32	41	20	28	5	5
Tanya Hilliard	1	5	1–0	30	48	22	28	0	5
Mary Myketyn-Driscoll	1	5	0–1	37	47	23	32	4	8

== Round robin results ==
All draw times listed in Atlantic Time (UTC−04:00).

=== Draw 1 ===
Tuesday, January 14, 2:00 pm

Sheet 1	1	2	3	4	5	6	7	8	9	10	11	Final
Allyson MacNutt	0	1	0	1	0	2	1	1	1	0	1	8
Mary Myketyn-Driscoll	1	0	1	0	4	0	0	0	0	1	0	7

Sheet 8	1	2	3	4	5	6	7	8	9	10	Final
Christina Black	0	3	0	1	1	0	2	2	X	X	9
Mackenzie Mitchell	1	0	1	0	0	1	0	0	X	X	3

Sheet 4	1	2	3	4	5	6	7	8	9	10	Final
Tanya Hilliard	2	0	2	0	0	0	4	1	0	X	9
Kristen MacDiarmid	0	2	0	2	5	2	0	0	0	X	11

=== Draw 3 ===
Wednesday, January 15, 8:00 am

Sheet 8	1	2	3	4	5	6	7	8	9	10	Final
Kristen MacDiarmid	0	2	0	2	0	1	0	0	0	0	5
Allyson MacNutt	0	0	2	0	1	0	2	1	1	1	8

Sheet 2	1	2	3	4	5	6	7	8	9	10	Final
Christina Black	0	1	0	1	2	1	0	1	1	X	7
Mary Myketyn-Driscoll	1	0	2	0	0	0	1	0	0	X	4

Sheet 4	1	2	3	4	5	6	7	8	9	10	11	Final
Rebecca Regan	0	0	0	1	0	0	0	0	2	1	1	5
Mackenzie Mitchell	0	2	0	0	0	1	0	1	0	0	0	4

=== Draw 5 ===
Wednesday, January 15, 4:00 pm

Sheet 1	1	2	3	4	5	6	7	8	9	10	Final
Christina Black	3	0	0	1	0	2	2	0	X	X	8
Rebecca Regan	0	0	0	0	2	0	0	1	X	X	3

Sheet 8	1	2	3	4	5	6	7	8	9	10	Final
Tanya Hilliard	0	2	0	1	1	0	0	3	1	0	8
Mary Myketyn-Driscoll	2	0	2	0	0	1	1	0	0	1	7

Sheet 2	1	2	3	4	5	6	7	8	9	10	Final
Allyson MacNutt	0	0	0	1	0	3	2	0	2	0	8
Mackenzie Mitchell	0	3	1	0	1	0	0	3	0	1	9

=== Draw 7 ===
Thursday, January 16, 9:00 am

Sheet 8	1	2	3	4	5	6	7	8	9	10	11	Final
Allyson MacNutt	0	0	2	0	1	0	0	1	3	0	3	10
Rebecca Regan	0	0	0	1	0	1	2	0	0	3	0	7

Sheet 2	1	2	3	4	5	6	7	8	9	10	Final
Kristen MacDiarmid	0	2	0	0	2	0	3	3	0	2	12
Mary Myketyn-Driscoll	2	0	2	2	0	2	0	0	3	0	11

Sheet 4	1	2	3	4	5	6	7	8	9	10	Final
Tanya Hilliard	0	0	1	0	1	1	0	1	1	0	5
Mackenzie Mitchell	1	2	0	1	0	0	1	0	0	1	6

=== Draw 9 ===
Thursday, January 16, 7:00 pm

Sheet 1	1	2	3	4	5	6	7	8	9	10	Final
Kristen MacDiarmid	2	0	1	1	1	0	1	1	0	X	7
Rebecca Regan	0	2	0	0	0	0	0	0	1	X	3

Sheet 8	1	2	3	4	5	6	7	8	9	10	Final
Mary Myketyn-Driscoll	0	0	0	0	0	0	0	0	X	X	0
Mackenzie Mitchell	1	0	0	0	1	1	1	1	X	X	5

Sheet 2	1	2	3	4	5	6	7	8	9	10	Final
Christina Black	2	0	3	0	2	0	3	X	X	X	10
Tanya Hilliard	0	1	0	1	0	1	0	X	X	X	3

=== Draw 11 ===
Friday, January 17, 2:00 pm

Sheet 1	1	2	3	4	5	6	7	8	9	10	Final
Tanya Hilliard	0	0	0	0	1	0	0	X	X	X	1
Allyson MacNutt	1	1	1	2	0	1	1	X	X	X	7

Sheet 8	1	2	3	4	5	6	7	8	9	10	Final
Christina Black	0	1	1	0	2	1	3	2	X	X	10
Kristen MacDiarmid	2	0	0	1	0	0	0	0	X	X	3

Sheet 4	1	2	3	4	5	6	7	8	9	10	11	Final
Mary Myketyn-Driscoll	0	0	1	0	1	1	3	0	1	0	1	8
Rebecca Regan	1	0	0	3	0	0	0	1	0	2	0	7

=== Draw 13 ===
Saturday, January 18, 8:00 am

Sheet 1	1	2	3	4	5	6	7	8	9	10	Final
Kristen MacDiarmid	0	0	2	0	1	0	0	0	0	X	3
Mackenzie Mitchell	0	2	0	3	0	0	1	2	3	X	11

Sheet 2	1	2	3	4	5	6	7	8	9	10	Final
Tanya Hilliard	1	0	1	0	0	1	0	1	X	X	4
Rebecca Regan	0	1	0	3	1	0	2	0	X	X	7

Sheet 4	1	2	3	4	5	6	7	8	9	10	Final
Christina Black	0	0	3	0	1	0	1	0	4	X	9
Allyson MacNutt	0	2	0	0	0	1	0	1	0	X	4

== Playoffs ==
Semifinal			Final
			1	Christina Black	6
2	Mackenzie Mitchell	11	2	Mackenzie Mitchell	4
3	Allyson MacNutt	4

=== Semifinal ===
Saturday, January 18, 6:00 pm

Sheet 8	1	2	3	4	5	6	7	8	9	10	Final
Mackenzie Mitchell	0	3	1	0	0	1	0	6	X	X	11
Allyson MacNutt	0	0	0	1	1	0	2	0	X	X	4

=== Final ===
Sunday, January 19, 9:00 am

Sheet 2	1	2	3	4	5	6	7	8	9	10	Final
Christina Black	0	1	0	1	0	1	3	0	0	X	6
Mackenzie Mitchell	0	0	1	0	1	0	0	1	1	X	4

2025 Ocean Contractors Women's Curling Championship

Christina Black
6th Nova Scotia Provincial Championship title
