= 2024 National =

Grand Slam of Curling event

2024 KIOTI National
- Host city: St. John's, Newfoundland and Labrador
- Arena: Mary Brown's Centre
- Dates: November 26 – December 1
- Attendance: 104,039 (tickets sold)
- Men's winner: (Scotland) Team Mouat
- Curling club: Curl Edinburgh, Edinburgh
- Skip: Bruce Mouat
- Third: Grant Hardie
- Second: Bobby Lammie
- Lead: Hammy McMillan Jr.
- Coach: Michael Goodfellow
- Finalist: (Alberta) Brad Jacobs
- Women's winner: (Ontario) Team Homan
- Curling club: Ottawa CC, Ottawa
- Skip: Rachel Homan
- Third: Tracy Fleury
- Second: Emma Miskew
- Lead: Sarah Wilkes
- Finalist: (Sweden) Anna Hasselborg

The 2024 KIOTI National was held from November 26 to December 1 at the Mary Brown's Centre in St. John's, Newfoundland and Labrador. It was the third Grand Slam event and second major of the 2024–25 curling season.

Scotland's Bruce Mouat rink won their third straight Grand Slam title, defeating Brad Jacobs Alberta-based rink in the men's final, 5–3. It was a career 9th Slam win for the Scots, who finished the event with a 6–1 record, and took home $38,000. In the final, Team Jacobs were forced to a single in the first, and responded by forcing Mouat to a draw to tie the game up 1–1 after two. After two blank ends, Mouat forced the Jacobs rink to a draw for one in the fifth after Mouat split the house. Jacobs missed an in-off attempt in the sixth which resulted in a draw for two for Mouat to take a 3–2 lead heading into the last two frames. Mouat forced Jacobs to a single again in seven after making a hit and roll preventing any double takeout opportunities to get a deuce. With the game now tied coming home, Mouat had just an open hit to win the game in the last end, which he made for two, to claim the championship.

The Ottawa-based Rachel Homan rink won their second straight Slam title, defeating Sweden's Anna Hasselborg rink in the women's final, 6–5. It was a career 17th Slam title for Homan, whose team went undefeated at the event to take home $42,000. The team needed comeback wins in all three of their playoff matchups, after being down against Sayaka Yoshimura in the quarters, and Kim Eun-jung in the semis in addition to the final. The game started off with a steal of one for Hasselborg in the first after Homan wrecked on a guard. Homan made a draw for two in the second to take a 2–1 lead, which was followed up by a hit for two for Hasselborg in the third. Hasselborg missed a raise takeout in the fourth, allowing Homan to get two more right back to take a 4–3 lead. Homan forced Hasselborg to one in the sixth, but missed a double raise attempt in the seventh resulting in a steal of one for Hasselborg, who took a 5–4 lead into the last end. On her last rock of the eighth, Homan "chiselled" out a Hasselborg rock to score two, and take the win.

The event was hailed "as the largest Grand Slam of Curling event ... ever hosted", with a total of 104,039 tickets sold, owing to the popularity of the hometown Brad Gushue rink in the province.

== Qualification ==
The top 16 ranked men's and women's teams on the World Curling Federation's world team rankings as of October 22, 2024, qualified for the event. The Grand Slam of Curling may fill one spot in each division as a sponsor's exemption. In the event that a team declines their invitation, the next-ranked team on the world team ranking is invited until the field is complete. 2024 Tour Challenge Tier 2 champion Christina Black competed in this event as opposed to the 2025 Masters as it conflicts with the 2025 Nova Scotia Scotties Tournament of Hearts.

=== Men ===
Top world team ranking men's teams:

1. (Scotland) Bruce Mouat
2. (Italy) Joël Retornaz
3. (Newfoundland and Labrador) Brad Gushue
4. (Switzerland) Yannick Schwaller
5. (Scotland) Ross Whyte
6. (Alberta) Brad Jacobs
7. (Saskatchewan) Mike McEwen
8. (Sweden) Niklas Edin
9. (Manitoba) Matt Dunstone
10. (Switzerland) Marco Hösli
11. (Switzerland) Michael Brunner
12. (Scotland) James Craik
13. (Norway) Magnus Ramsfjell
14. (Manitoba) Reid Carruthers
15. (Germany) Marc Muskatewitz
16. (United States) John Shuster

=== Women ===
Top world team ranking women's teams:

1. (Ontario) Rachel Homan
2. (Switzerland) Silvana Tirinzoni
3. (South Korea) Gim Eun-ji
4. (Sweden) Anna Hasselborg
5. (South Korea) Kim Eun-jung
6. (Japan) Satsuki Fujisawa
7. (Manitoba) Kerri Einarson
8. (Switzerland) Xenia Schwaller
9. (Sweden) Isabella Wranå
10. (Italy) Stefania Constantini
11. (Manitoba) Kaitlyn Lawes
12. (Manitoba) Chelsea Carey
13. (Japan) Momoha Tabata
14. (Japan) Sayaka Yoshimura
15. (South Korea) Ha Seung-youn

Tour Challenge Tier 2 champion:

- (Nova Scotia) Christina Black

== Men ==
=== Teams ===
The teams are listed as follows:

Skip	Third	Second	Lead	Alternate	Locale
Michael Brunner	Anthony Petoud	Romano Meier	Andreas Gerlach		Bern, Switzerland
Reid Carruthers	Catlin Schneider	Kyle Doering	Connor Njegovan		Winnipeg, Manitoba
James Craik	Mark Watt	Angus Bryce	Blair Haswell		Forfar, Scotland
Matt Dunstone	B. J. Neufeld	Colton Lott	Ryan Harnden		Winnipeg, Manitoba
Niklas Edin	Oskar Eriksson	Rasmus Wranå	Christoffer Sundgren		Karlstad, Sweden
Brad Gushue	Mark Nichols	Brendan Bottcher	Geoff Walker		St. John's, Newfoundland and Labrador
Philipp Hösli (Fourth)	Marco Hösli (Skip)	Simon Gloor	Justin Hausherr		Glarus, Switzerland
Brad Jacobs	Marc Kennedy	Brett Gallant	Ben Hebert		Calgary, Alberta
Mike McEwen	Colton Flasch	Kevin Marsh	Dan Marsh		Saskatoon, Saskatchewan
Bruce Mouat	Grant Hardie	Bobby Lammie	Hammy McMillan Jr.		Edinburgh, Scotland
Marc Muskatewitz	Benny Kapp	Felix Messenzehl	Johannes Scheuerl	Mario Trevisiol	Füssen, Germany
Magnus Ramsfjell	Martin Sesaker	Bendik Ramsfjell	Gaute Nepstad		Trondheim, Norway
Joël Retornaz	Amos Mosaner	Sebastiano Arman	Mattia Giovanella		Trentino, Italy
Benoît Schwarz-van Berkel (Fourth)	Sven Michel (Skip)	Kim Schwaller (Note: Kim Schwaller spared for Yannick Schwaller who was recovering from a knee operation. He played second while Sven Michel played third and skipped the team.)	Pablo Lachat		Geneva, Switzerland
John Shuster	Chris Plys	Colin Hufman	Matt Hamilton		(United States) Duluth, Minnesota
Ross Whyte	Robin Brydone	Craig Waddell (Note: Craig Waddell replaced Duncan McFadzean who was recovering from a knee injury.)	Euan Kyle		Stirling, Scotland

=== Round robin standings ===
Final Round Robin Standings

Key
Teams to Playoffs
Teams to Tiebreaker

Pool A	W	L	PF	PA	LSD
(Scotland) Bruce Mouat	3	1	25	14	47.4
(United States) John Shuster	3	1	19	15	139.6
(Manitoba) Matt Dunstone	1	3	15	22	8
(Sweden) Niklas Edin	1	3	13	25	100.8

Pool D	W	L	PF	PA	LSD
(Alberta) Brad Jacobs	4	0	28	14	28.5
(Italy) Joël Retornaz	2	2	20	11	1.7
(Norway) Magnus Ramsfjell	1	3	11	21	28.7
(Scotland) James Craik	1	3	17	26	50.2

Pool B	W	L	PF	PA	LSD
(Saskatchewan) Mike McEwen	4	0	24	8	12
(Newfoundland and Labrador) Brad Gushue	2	2	21	17	42.3
(Switzerland) Marco Hösli	2	2	20	21	94.9
(Manitoba) Reid Carruthers	1	3	14	27	68.7

Pool C	W	L	PF	PA	LSD
(Scotland) Ross Whyte	3	1	26	14	13.2
(Germany) Marc Muskatewitz	2	2	21	25	132.6
(Switzerland) Team Schwaller	1	3	21	24	71.6
(Switzerland) Michael Brunner	1	3	14	25	98.2

=== Round robin results ===
All draw times are listed in Newfoundland Time (UTC−03:30).

==== Draw 1 ====
Tuesday, November 26, 8:00 am

Sheet A	1	2	3	4	5	6	7	8	Final
(Scotland) Ross Whyte 🔨	3	0	0	3	0	1	X	X	7
(Switzerland) Marco Hösli	0	0	1	0	1	0	X	X	2

Sheet B	1	2	3	4	5	6	7	8	Final
(Saskatchewan) Mike McEwen 🔨	0	0	0	3	0	4	X	X	7
(Switzerland) Michael Brunner	0	0	1	0	1	0	X	X	2

Sheet C	1	2	3	4	5	6	7	8	Final
(Switzerland) Team Schwaller	0	1	0	2	0	2	0	0	5
(Manitoba) Reid Carruthers 🔨	2	0	1	0	1	0	2	1	7

Sheet D	1	2	3	4	5	6	7	8	Final
(Scotland) Bruce Mouat 🔨	0	1	0	2	0	1	2	1	7
(Scotland) James Craik	2	0	1	0	1	0	0	0	4

==== Draw 3 ====
Tuesday, November 26, 3:00 pm

Sheet A	1	2	3	4	5	6	7	8	Final
(Alberta) Brad Jacobs 🔨	1	0	0	3	3	X	X	X	7
(Sweden) Niklas Edin	0	0	1	0	0	X	X	X	1

Sheet B	1	2	3	4	5	6	7	8	Final
(Italy) Joël Retornaz 🔨	0	0	1	1	3	0	X	X	5
(United States) John Shuster	0	0	0	0	0	1	X	X	1

Sheet C	1	2	3	4	5	6	7	8	Final
(Manitoba) Matt Dunstone 🔨	0	2	0	0	0	1	1	X	4
(Norway) Magnus Ramsfjell	0	0	1	0	0	0	0	X	1

Sheet D	1	2	3	4	5	6	7	8	Final
(Newfoundland and Labrador) Brad Gushue 🔨	2	2	0	2	0	X	X	X	6
(Germany) Marc Muskatewitz	0	0	1	0	1	X	X	X	2

==== Draw 6 ====
Wednesday, November 27, 12:00 pm

Sheet B	1	2	3	4	5	6	7	8	9	Final
(Switzerland) Team Schwaller 🔨	2	0	0	2	1	0	0	1	0	6
(Germany) Marc Muskatewitz	0	2	2	0	0	0	2	0	2	8

Sheet C	1	2	3	4	5	6	7	8	Final
(Saskatchewan) Mike McEwen 🔨	0	2	0	1	0	1	1	X	5
(Switzerland) Marco Hösli	0	0	1	0	1	0	0	X	2

Sheet D	1	2	3	4	5	6	7	8	Final
(Scotland) Ross Whyte 🔨	1	0	0	1	0	3	2	X	7
(Switzerland) Michael Brunner	0	1	0	0	1	0	0	X	2

==== Draw 7 ====
Wednesday, November 27, 4:00 pm

Sheet A	1	2	3	4	5	6	7	8	Final
(Newfoundland and Labrador) Brad Gushue 🔨	0	3	2	0	0	1	0	X	6
(Manitoba) Reid Carruthers	0	0	0	0	2	0	1	X	3

==== Draw 8 ====
Wednesday, November 27, 8:00 pm

Sheet A	1	2	3	4	5	6	7	8	Final
(Scotland) Bruce Mouat	0	0	1	0	1	0	1	0	3
(United States) John Shuster 🔨	0	1	0	1	0	1	0	3	6

Sheet B	1	2	3	4	5	6	7	8	Final
(Manitoba) Matt Dunstone 🔨	0	0	2	0	2	0	0	X	4
(Sweden) Niklas Edin	1	2	0	1	0	1	3	X	8

Sheet C	1	2	3	4	5	6	7	8	Final
(Italy) Joël Retornaz 🔨	0	1	0	0	2	0	0	0	3
(Scotland) James Craik	0	0	0	2	0	0	1	1	4

Sheet D	1	2	3	4	5	6	7	8	Final
(Alberta) Brad Jacobs 🔨	0	1	0	1	0	0	0	3	5
(Norway) Magnus Ramsfjell	0	0	1	0	1	2	0	0	4

==== Draw 10 ====
Thursday, November 28, 12:00 pm

Sheet A	1	2	3	4	5	6	7	8	Final
(Italy) Joël Retornaz 🔨	3	2	0	1	2	X	X	X	8
(Norway) Magnus Ramsfjell	0	0	0	0	0	X	X	X	0

Sheet B	1	2	3	4	5	6	7	8	Final
(Alberta) Brad Jacobs	3	1	0	3	0	3	X	X	10
(Scotland) James Craik 🔨	0	0	2	0	3	0	X	X	5

Sheet C	1	2	3	4	5	6	7	8	Final
(Scotland) Bruce Mouat 🔨	0	3	0	0	1	0	1	X	5
(Manitoba) Matt Dunstone	0	0	1	0	0	1	0	X	2

Sheet D	1	2	3	4	5	6	7	8	Final
(Sweden) Niklas Edin 🔨	0	1	0	0	0	0	1	0	2
(United States) John Shuster	0	0	2	0	0	1	0	1	4

==== Draw 12 ====
Thursday, November 28, 8:00 pm

Sheet A	1	2	3	4	5	6	7	8	Final
(Switzerland) Team Schwaller	0	2	0	1	0	0	2	0	5
(Switzerland) Michael Brunner 🔨	2	0	1	0	0	1	0	2	6

Sheet B	1	2	3	4	5	6	7	8	Final
(Scotland) Ross Whyte	0	3	0	0	2	0	4	X	9
(Germany) Marc Muskatewitz 🔨	2	0	0	2	0	1	0	X	5

Sheet C	1	2	3	4	5	6	7	8	Final
(Newfoundland and Labrador) Brad Gushue	0	0	0	0	1	0	2	0	3
(Saskatchewan) Mike McEwen 🔨	0	0	0	1	0	2	0	1	4

Sheet D	1	2	3	4	5	6	7	8	Final
(Switzerland) Marco Hösli 🔨	1	0	2	0	2	3	X	X	8
(Manitoba) Reid Carruthers	0	1	0	2	0	0	X	X	3

==== Draw 13 ====
Friday, November 29, 8:30 am

Sheet A	1	2	3	4	5	6	7	8	9	Final
(Manitoba) Matt Dunstone	0	1	0	1	0	0	0	3	0	5
(United States) John Shuster 🔨	2	0	0	0	0	0	3	0	3	8

Sheet C	1	2	3	4	5	6	7	8	Final
(Norway) Magnus Ramsfjell	0	4	1	0	0	1	0	X	6
(Scotland) James Craik 🔨	1	0	0	1	1	0	1	X	4

==== Draw 14 ====
Friday, November 29, 12:00 pm

Sheet B	1	2	3	4	5	6	7	8	Final
(Scotland) Bruce Mouat	0	4	0	4	2	X	X	X	10
(Sweden) Niklas Edin 🔨	1	0	1	0	0	X	X	X	2

Sheet D	1	2	3	4	5	6	7	8	Final
(Italy) Joël Retornaz 🔨	0	1	0	0	0	2	1	0	4
(Alberta) Brad Jacobs	1	0	0	4	0	0	0	1	6

==== Draw 16 ====
Friday, November 29, 8:00 pm

Sheet A	1	2	3	4	5	6	7	8	Final
(Saskatchewan) Mike McEwen 🔨	0	3	0	3	2	X	X	X	8
(Manitoba) Reid Carruthers	0	0	1	0	0	X	X	X	1

Sheet B	1	2	3	4	5	6	7	8	9	Final
(Newfoundland and Labrador) Brad Gushue 🔨	3	0	1	0	1	0	0	1	0	6
(Switzerland) Marco Hösli	0	2	0	2	0	1	1	0	2	8

Sheet C	1	2	3	4	5	6	7	8	Final
(Switzerland) Michael Brunner	0	2	1	0	1	0	0	0	4
(Germany) Marc Muskatewitz 🔨	2	0	0	2	0	1	0	1	6

Sheet D	1	2	3	4	5	6	7	8	Final
(Switzerland) Team Schwaller 🔨	1	0	0	2	2	0	0	X	5
(Scotland) Ross Whyte	0	0	1	0	0	2	0	X	3

=== Tiebreaker ===
Saturday, November 30, 8:30 am

Sheet D	1	2	3	4	5	6	7	8	Final
(Switzerland) Marco Hösli	0	1	1	0	0	0	1	0	3
(Germany) Marc Muskatewitz 🔨	2	0	0	0	2	0	0	1	5

Player percentages
(Switzerland) Team Hösli		(Germany) Team Muskatewitz	
Justin Hausherr	97%	Johannes Scheuerl	92%
Simon Gloor	92%	Felix Messenzehl	86%
Marco Hösli	63%	Benjamin Kapp	95%
Philipp Hösli	88%	Marc Muskatewitz	84%
Total	85%	Total	89%

=== Playoffs ===
Quarterfinals
1	(Saskatchewan) Mike McEwen	6
8	(Germany) Marc Muskatewitz	5
4	(Scotland) Bruce Mouat	7
5	(United States) John Shuster	2
2	(Alberta) Brad Jacobs	6
7	(Newfoundland and Labrador) Brad Gushue	5
3	(Scotland) Ross Whyte	6
6	(Italy) Joël Retornaz	3

Semifinals
1	(Saskatchewan) Mike McEwen	1
4	(Scotland) Bruce Mouat	5
2	(Alberta) Brad Jacobs	6
3	(Scotland) Ross Whyte	3

Final
4	(Scotland) Bruce Mouat	5
2	(Alberta) Brad Jacobs	3

==== Quarterfinals ====
Saturday, November 30, 4:00 pm

Sheet A	1	2	3	4	5	6	7	8	Final
(Alberta) Brad Jacobs 🔨	1	0	3	0	1	0	0	1	6
(Newfoundland and Labrador) Brad Gushue	0	2	0	1	0	1	1	0	5

Player percentages
(Alberta) Team Jacobs		(Newfoundland and Labrador) Team Gushue	
Ben Hebert	88%	Geoff Walker	97%
Brett Gallant	75%	Brendan Bottcher	83%
Marc Kennedy	78%	Mark Nichols	84%
Brad Jacobs	89%	Brad Gushue	86%
Total	82%	Total	88%

Sheet B	1	2	3	4	5	6	7	8	9	Final
(Saskatchewan) Mike McEwen 🔨	0	1	0	2	0	2	0	0	1	6
(Germany) Marc Muskatewitz	0	0	1	0	2	0	1	1	0	5

Player percentages
(Saskatchewan) Team McEwen		(Germany) Team Muskatewitz	
Dan Marsh	96%	Johannes Scheuerl	86%
Kevin Marsh	90%	Felix Messenzehl	68%
Colton Flasch	81%	Benjamin Kapp	85%
Mike McEwen	86%	Marc Muskatewitz	68%
Total	88%	Total	77%

Sheet C	1	2	3	4	5	6	7	8	Final
(Scotland) Ross Whyte 🔨	2	0	0	2	0	2	0	X	6
(Italy) Joël Retornaz	0	2	0	0	1	0	0	X	3

Player percentages
(Scotland) Team Whyte		(Italy) Team Retornaz	
Euan Kyle	97%	Mattia Giovanella	91%
Duncan McFadzean	73%	Sebastiano Arman	78%
Robin Brydone	67%	Amos Mosaner	88%
Ross Whyte	86%	Joël Retornaz	80%
Total	81%	Total	84%

Sheet D	1	2	3	4	5	6	7	8	Final
(Scotland) Bruce Mouat 🔨	4	0	0	0	1	2	X	X	7
(United States) John Shuster	0	0	1	1	0	0	X	X	2

Player percentages
(Scotland) Team Mouat		(United States) Team Shuster	
Hammy McMillan Jr.	83%	Matt Hamilton	92%
Bobby Lammie	75%	Colin Hufman	88%
Grant Hardie	88%	Chris Plys	75%
Bruce Mouat	96%	John Shuster	83%
Total	85%	Total	84%

==== Semifinals ====
Saturday, November 30, 8:00 pm

Sheet B	1	2	3	4	5	6	7	8	Final
(Alberta) Brad Jacobs 🔨	0	2	0	2	0	0	0	2	6
(Scotland) Ross Whyte	0	0	1	0	2	0	0	0	3

Player percentages
(Alberta) Team Jacobs		(Scotland) Team Whyte	
Ben Hebert	97%	Euan Kyle	92%
Brett Gallant	95%	Duncan McFadzean	77%
Marc Kennedy	95%	Robin Brydone	91%
Brad Jacobs	89%	Ross Whyte	69%
Total	94%	Total	82%

Sheet C	1	2	3	4	5	6	7	8	Final
(Saskatchewan) Mike McEwen 🔨	0	0	1	0	0	0	X	X	1
(Scotland) Bruce Mouat	0	2	0	1	1	1	X	X	5

Player percentages
(Saskatchewan) Team McEwen		(Scotland) Team Mouat	
Dan Marsh	75%	Hammy McMillan Jr.	96%
Kevin Marsh	77%	Bobby Lammie	88%
Colton Flasch	84%	Grant Hardie	84%
Mike McEwen	60%	Bruce Mouat	91%
Total	74%	Total	90%

==== Final ====
Sunday, December 1, 5:00 pm

Sheet B	1	2	3	4	5	6	7	8	Final
(Scotland) Bruce Mouat	0	1	0	0	0	2	0	2	5
(Alberta) Brad Jacobs 🔨	1	0	0	0	1	0	1	0	3

Player percentages
(Scotland) Team Mouat		(Alberta) Team Jacobs	
Hammy McMillan Jr.	97%	Ben Hebert	88%
Bobby Lammie	88%	Brett Gallant	69%
Grant Hardie	94%	Marc Kennedy	94%
Bruce Mouat	89%	Brad Jacobs	81%
Total	92%	Total	83%

== Women ==
=== Teams ===
The teams are listed as follows:

Skip	Third	Second	Lead	Alternate	Locale
Christina Black	Jill Brothers	Marlee Powers (Note: Alternate Marlee Powers played second, replacing Jenn Baxter.)	Karlee Everist		Halifax, Nova Scotia
Chelsea Carey	Karlee Burgess	Lindsey Burgess (Note: Lindsey Burgess spared for Emily Zacharias.)	Lauren Lenentine		Winnipeg, Manitoba
Stefania Constantini	Giulia Zardini Lacedelli	Elena Mathis	Angela Romei	Marta Lo Deserto	Cortina d'Ampezzo, Italy
Kerri Einarson	Val Sweeting	Brittany Tran (Note: Brittany Tran replaced Shannon Birchard who was recovering from a knee injury.)	Krysten Karwacki		Gimli, Manitoba
Satsuki Fujisawa	Chinami Yoshida	Yumi Suzuki	Yurika Yoshida		Kitami, Japan
Gim Eun-ji	Kim Min-ji	Kim Su-ji	– (Note: Team Gim played with three players.)		Uijeongbu, South Korea
Ha Seung-youn	Kim Hye-rin	Yang Tae-i	Kim Su-jin	Park Seo-jin	Chuncheon, South Korea
Anna Hasselborg	Sara McManus	Agnes Knochenhauer	Sofia Mabergs		Sundbyberg, Sweden
Rachel Homan	Tracy Fleury	Emma Miskew	Sarah Wilkes		Ottawa, Ontario
Kim Eun-jung	Kim Kyeong-ae	Kim Cho-hi	Kim Seon-yeong		Gangneung, South Korea
Kaitlyn Lawes	Selena Njegovan	Jocelyn Peterman	Kristin Gordon	Becca Hebert	Winnipeg, Manitoba
Xenia Schwaller	Selina Gafner	Fabienne Rieder	Selina Rychiger		Zurich, Switzerland
Momoha Tabata (Fourth)	Miku Nihira (Skip)	Sae Yamamoto	Mikoto Nakajima	Ayami Ito	Sapporo, Japan
Alina Pätz (Fourth)	Silvana Tirinzoni (Skip)	Carole Howald	Selina Witschonke		Aarau, Switzerland
Isabella Wranå	Almida de Val	Maria Larsson	Linda Stenlund		Sundbyberg, Sweden
Sayaka Yoshimura	Yuna Kotani	Mina Kobayashi (Note: Alternate Mina Kobayashi played second, replacing Kaho Onodera who was competing in the 2024 Japan Mixed Doubles Curling Championship.)	Anna Ohmiya		Sapporo, Japan

=== Round robin standings ===
Final Round Robin Standings

Key
Teams to Playoffs
Teams to Tiebreakers

Pool A	W	L	PF	PA	LSD
(Ontario) Rachel Homan	4	0	32	15	111.6
(Nova Scotia) Christina Black	2	2	20	27	209.7
(Sweden) Isabella Wranå	1	3	19	27	103.2
(Italy) Stefania Constantini	0	4	22	32	110.3

Pool D	W	L	PF	PA	LSD
(South Korea) Kim Eun-jung	4	0	24	17	84.2
(Manitoba) Kerri Einarson	3	1	29	18	29.5
(South Korea) Ha Seung-youn	2	2	25	26	114.3
(Manitoba) Chelsea Carey	0	4	18	27	128.6

Pool B	W	L	PF	PA	LSD
(Japan) Satsuki Fujisawa	3	1	22	17	93.2
(Japan) Sayaka Yoshimura	2	2	18	21	29.3
(Switzerland) Silvana Tirinzoni	2	2	20	16	202
(Manitoba) Kaitlyn Lawes	1	3	17	22	28.2

Pool C	W	L	PF	PA	LSD
(Sweden) Anna Hasselborg	4	0	28	14	10.8
(South Korea) Gim Eun-ji	2	2	19	20	30.1
(Japan) Team Tabata	1	3	16	22	32
(Switzerland) Xenia Schwaller	1	3	21	29	88.5

=== Round robin results ===
All draw times are listed in Newfoundland Time (UTC−03:30).

==== Draw 2 ====
Tuesday, November 26, 11:30 am

Sheet A	1	2	3	4	5	6	7	8	Final
(Sweden) Anna Hasselborg 🔨	0	2	0	2	0	1	2	X	7
(Manitoba) Kaitlyn Lawes	1	0	0	0	2	0	0	X	3

Sheet B	1	2	3	4	5	6	7	8	Final
(Japan) Satsuki Fujisawa	2	0	1	0	2	0	0	3	8
(Switzerland) Xenia Schwaller 🔨	0	1	0	2	0	1	1	0	5

Sheet C	1	2	3	4	5	6	7	8	Final
(South Korea) Gim Eun-ji	0	2	1	0	2	1	0	X	6
(Japan) Sayaka Yoshimura 🔨	0	0	0	2	0	0	1	X	3

Sheet D	1	2	3	4	5	6	7	8	Final
(Switzerland) Silvana Tirinzoni 🔨	0	2	0	2	0	3	X	X	7
(Japan) Team Tabata	0	0	2	0	0	0	X	X	2

==== Draw 4 ====
Tuesday, November 26, 6:30 pm

Sheet A	1	2	3	4	5	6	7	8	Final
(South Korea) Kim Eun-jung 🔨	0	2	0	1	0	3	0	X	6
(Sweden) Isabella Wranå	1	0	1	0	1	0	1	X	4

Sheet B	1	2	3	4	5	6	7	8	Final
(Manitoba) Kerri Einarson 🔨	2	0	1	0	3	0	5	X	11
(Nova Scotia) Christina Black	0	1	0	1	0	1	0	X	3

Sheet C	1	2	3	4	5	6	7	8	Final
(Italy) Stefania Constantini 🔨	0	4	0	1	0	3	0	0	8
(South Korea) Ha Seung-youn	3	0	1	0	2	0	4	1	11

Sheet D	1	2	3	4	5	6	7	8	Final
(Ontario) Rachel Homan 🔨	1	0	1	0	1	4	1	X	8
(Manitoba) Chelsea Carey	0	2	0	1	0	0	0	X	3

==== Draw 5 ====
Wednesday, November 27, 8:30 am

Sheet A	1	2	3	4	5	6	7	8	Final
(Japan) Satsuki Fujisawa 🔨	1	2	0	1	1	0	1	X	6
(Japan) Sayaka Yoshimura	0	0	1	0	0	2	0	X	3

Sheet B	1	2	3	4	5	6	7	8	Final
(Switzerland) Silvana Tirinzoni	0	0	1	0	2	0	1	0	4
(Manitoba) Kaitlyn Lawes 🔨	1	0	0	1	0	2	0	1	5

Sheet C	1	2	3	4	5	6	7	8	Final
(Switzerland) Xenia Schwaller	1	0	0	2	0	0	1	0	4
(Japan) Team Tabata 🔨	0	0	1	0	1	2	0	2	6

Sheet D	1	2	3	4	5	6	7	8	Final
(South Korea) Gim Eun-ji	0	0	1	0	0	0	1	X	2
(Sweden) Anna Hasselborg 🔨	0	1	0	3	2	0	0	X	6

==== Draw 6 ====
Wednesday, November 27, 12:00 pm

Sheet A	1	2	3	4	5	6	7	8	Final
(Ontario) Rachel Homan 🔨	2	0	0	1	1	0	2	X	6
(Nova Scotia) Christina Black	0	1	1	0	0	1	0	X	3

==== Draw 7 ====
Wednesday, November 27, 4:00 pm

Sheet B	1	2	3	4	5	6	7	8	9	Final
(Italy) Stefania Constantini 🔨	1	0	1	0	1	0	0	1	0	4
(Sweden) Isabella Wranå	0	1	0	0	0	2	1	0	2	6

Sheet C	1	2	3	4	5	6	7	8	9	Final
(Manitoba) Kerri Einarson	0	0	2	2	0	0	1	0	2	7
(Manitoba) Chelsea Carey 🔨	0	1	0	0	2	1	0	1	0	5

Sheet D	1	2	3	4	5	6	7	8	Final
(South Korea) Kim Eun-jung	0	2	0	1	0	2	1	X	6
(South Korea) Ha Seung-youn 🔨	1	0	1	0	2	0	0	X	4

==== Draw 9 ====
Thursday, November 28, 8:30 am

Sheet A	1	2	3	4	5	6	7	8	Final
(Manitoba) Kerri Einarson	0	1	0	0	2	1	0	4	8
(South Korea) Ha Seung-youn 🔨	1	0	2	1	0	0	1	0	5

Sheet B	1	2	3	4	5	6	7	8	Final
(South Korea) Kim Eun-jung	0	1	0	3	1	0	1	1	7
(Manitoba) Chelsea Carey 🔨	4	0	1	0	0	1	0	0	6

Sheet C	1	2	3	4	5	6	7	8	Final
(Ontario) Rachel Homan 🔨	0	2	0	0	2	3	0	X	7
(Italy) Stefania Constantini	1	0	0	1	0	0	1	X	3

Sheet D	1	2	3	4	5	6	7	8	Final
(Sweden) Isabella Wranå	0	1	0	1	1	0	0	X	3
(Nova Scotia) Christina Black 🔨	1	0	3	0	0	1	1	X	6

==== Draw 11 ====
Thursday, November 28, 4:00 pm

Sheet A	1	2	3	4	5	6	7	8	9	Final
(South Korea) Gim Eun-ji 🔨	0	0	1	0	0	2	0	3	0	6
(Switzerland) Xenia Schwaller	2	1	0	0	2	0	1	0	1	7

Sheet B	1	2	3	4	5	6	7	8	Final
(Sweden) Anna Hasselborg 🔨	2	0	3	0	0	0	1	X	6
(Japan) Team Tabata	0	2	0	0	0	1	0	X	4

Sheet C	1	2	3	4	5	6	7	8	Final
(Switzerland) Silvana Tirinzoni	0	1	0	0	1	0	1	2	5
(Japan) Satsuki Fujisawa 🔨	1	0	0	2	0	0	0	0	3

Sheet D	1	2	3	4	5	6	7	8	9	Final
(Manitoba) Kaitlyn Lawes	0	1	0	1	0	2	0	1	0	5
(Japan) Sayaka Yoshimura 🔨	2	0	1	0	1	0	1	0	1	6

==== Draw 13 ====
Friday, November 29, 8:30 am

Sheet B	1	2	3	4	5	6	7	8	Final
(Japan) Satsuki Fujisawa	0	1	1	0	0	2	0	1	5
(Manitoba) Kaitlyn Lawes 🔨	0	0	0	2	1	0	1	0	4

Sheet D	1	2	3	4	5	6	7	8	Final
(Sweden) Anna Hasselborg	1	0	0	2	0	4	2	X	9
(Switzerland) Xenia Schwaller 🔨	0	2	1	0	2	0	0	X	5

==== Draw 14 ====
Friday, November 29, 12:00 pm

Sheet A	1	2	3	4	5	6	7	8	Final
(Italy) Stefania Constantini 🔨	3	0	1	0	1	1	1	0	7
(Nova Scotia) Christina Black	0	5	0	2	0	0	0	1	8

Sheet C	1	2	3	4	5	6	7	8	Final
(South Korea) Ha Seung-youn 🔨	0	1	0	0	1	0	2	1	5
(Manitoba) Chelsea Carey	1	0	1	1	0	1	0	0	4

==== Draw 15 ====
Friday, November 29, 4:00 pm

Sheet A	1	2	3	4	5	6	7	8	Final
(Switzerland) Silvana Tirinzoni	0	0	1	1	1	0	1	X	4
(Japan) Sayaka Yoshimura 🔨	3	2	0	0	0	1	0	X	6

Sheet B	1	2	3	4	5	6	7	8	Final
(Ontario) Rachel Homan	0	0	2	1	0	2	0	6	11
(Sweden) Isabella Wranå 🔨	0	1	0	0	2	0	3	0	6

Sheet C	1	2	3	4	5	6	7	8	9	Final
(South Korea) Gim Eun-ji 🔨	0	1	1	0	0	1	1	0	1	5
(Japan) Team Tabata	0	0	0	1	2	0	0	1	0	4

Sheet D	1	2	3	4	5	6	7	8	Final
(Manitoba) Kerri Einarson 🔨	1	0	2	0	0	0	0	0	3
(South Korea) Kim Eun-jung	0	2	0	0	1	0	1	1	5

=== Tiebreakers ===
Saturday, November 30, 8:30 am

Sheet A	1	2	3	4	5	6	7	8	Final
(South Korea) Gim Eun-ji	0	3	0	1	0	1	X	X	5
(Nova Scotia) Christina Black 🔨	3	0	2	0	4	0	X	X	9

Player percentages
(South Korea) Team Gim		(Nova Scotia) Team Black	
–		Karlee Everist	85%
Kim Su-ji	75%	Marlee Powers	65%
Kim Min-ji	79%	Jill Brothers	75%
Gim Eun-ji	63%	Christina Black	79%
Total	72%	Total	76%

Sheet B	1	2	3	4	5	6	7	8	Final
(South Korea) Ha Seung-youn	2	0	2	1	0	1	3	X	9
(Switzerland) Silvana Tirinzoni 🔨	0	1	0	0	1	0	0	X	2

Player percentages
(South Korea) Team Ha		(Switzerland) Team Tirinzoni	
Kim Su-jin	73%	Selina Witschonke	91%
Yang Tae-i	79%	Carole Howald	63%
Kim Hye-rin	79%	Silvana Tirinzoni	68%
Ha Seung-youn	84%	Alina Pätz	54%
Total	79%	Total	69%

=== Playoffs ===
Quarterfinals
1	(Sweden) Anna Hasselborg	7
8	(Nova Scotia) Christina Black	6
4	(Manitoba) Kerri Einarson	12
5	(Japan) Satsuki Fujisawa	3
2	(South Korea) Kim Eun-jung	6
7	(South Korea) Ha Seung-youn	3
3	(Ontario) Rachel Homan	7
6	(Japan) Sayaka Yoshimura	6

Semifinals
1	(Sweden) Anna Hasselborg	7
4	(Manitoba) Kerri Einarson	1
2	(South Korea) Kim Eun-jung	6
3	(Ontario) Rachel Homan	7

Final
1	(Sweden) Anna Hasselborg	5
3	(Ontario) Rachel Homan	6

==== Quarterfinals ====
Saturday, November 30, 12:00 pm

Sheet A	1	2	3	4	5	6	7	8	Final
(Manitoba) Kerri Einarson 🔨	0	5	1	1	0	1	4	X	12
(Japan) Satsuki Fujisawa	1	0	0	0	2	0	0	X	3

Player percentages
(Manitoba) Team Einarson		(Japan) Team Fujisawa	
Krysten Karwacki	61%	Yurika Yoshida	84%
Brittany Tran	82%	Yumi Suzuki	61%
Val Sweeting	79%	Chinami Yoshida	66%
Kerri Einarson	73%	Satsuki Fujisawa	52%
Total	74%	Total	66%

Sheet B	1	2	3	4	5	6	7	8	9	Final
(Sweden) Anna Hasselborg 🔨	1	2	0	0	1	0	2	0	1	7
(Nova Scotia) Christina Black	0	0	0	2	0	1	0	3	0	6

Player percentages
(Sweden) Team Hasselborg		(Nova Scotia) Team Black	
Sofia Mabergs	92%	Karlee Everist	81%
Agnes Knochenhauer	88%	Marlee Powers	86%
Sara McManus	82%	Jill Brothers	90%
Anna Hasselborg	88%	Christina Black	88%
Total	87%	Total	85%

Sheet C	1	2	3	4	5	6	7	8	9	Final
(Ontario) Rachel Homan 🔨	0	2	0	1	0	2	0	1	1	7
(Japan) Sayaka Yoshimura	0	0	3	0	1	0	2	0	0	6

Player percentages
(Ontario) Team Homan		(Japan) Team Yoshimura	
Sarah Wilkes	90%	Anna Ohmiya	93%
Emma Miskew	82%	Mina Kobayashi	85%
Tracy Fleury	72%	Yuna Kotani	81%
Rachel Homan	83%	Sayaka Yoshimura	85%
Total	82%	Total	86%

Sheet D	1	2	3	4	5	6	7	8	Final
(South Korea) Kim Eun-jung 🔨	0	0	4	0	1	1	0	X	6
(South Korea) Ha Seung-youn	0	0	0	2	0	0	1	X	3

Player percentages
(South Korea) Team Kim		(South Korea) Team Ha	
Kim Seon-yeong	89%	Kim Su-jin	91%
Kim Cho-hi	93%	Yang Tae-i	88%
Kim Kyeong-ae	71%	Kim Hye-rin	88%
Kim Eun-jung	84%	Ha Seung-youn	73%
Total	84%	Total	85%

==== Semifinals ====
Saturday, November 30, 8:00 pm

Sheet A	1	2	3	4	5	6	7	8	9	Final
(South Korea) Kim Eun-jung 🔨	2	0	0	2	1	0	0	1	0	6
(Ontario) Rachel Homan	0	2	0	0	0	2	2	0	1	7

Player percentages
(South Korea) Team Kim		(Ontario) Team Homan	
Kim Seon-yeong	92%	Sarah Wilkes	85%
Kim Cho-hi	82%	Emma Miskew	71%
Kim Kyeong-ae	81%	Tracy Fleury	85%
Kim Eun-jung	78%	Rachel Homan	81%
Total	83%	Total	81%

Sheet D	1	2	3	4	5	6	7	8	Final
(Sweden) Anna Hasselborg 🔨	0	3	0	1	2	1	X	X	7
(Manitoba) Kerri Einarson	0	0	1	0	0	0	X	X	1

Player percentages
(Sweden) Team Hasselborg		(Manitoba) Team Einarson	
Sofia Mabergs	90%	Krysten Karwacki	96%
Agnes Knochenhauer	90%	Brittany Tran	56%
Sara McManus	79%	Val Sweeting	77%
Anna Hasselborg	90%	Kerri Einarson	58%
Total	87%	Total	72%

==== Final ====
Sunday, December 1, 12:30 pm

Sheet B	1	2	3	4	5	6	7	8	Final
(Sweden) Anna Hasselborg	1	0	2	0	0	1	1	0	5
(Ontario) Rachel Homan 🔨	0	2	0	2	0	0	0	2	6

Player percentages
(Sweden) Team Hasselborg		(Ontario) Team Homan	
Sofia Mabergs	81%	Sarah Wilkes	81%
Agnes Knochenhauer	86%	Emma Miskew	75%
Sara McManus	91%	Tracy Fleury	77%
Anna Hasselborg	84%	Rachel Homan	69%
Total	86%	Total	75%
