= Emily Dwyer =

Canadian curler

Emily Dwyer (born c. 1993) is a Canadian curler from Lower Sackville, Nova Scotia. She currently skips a team on the World Curling Tour. Dwyer was born in Ottawa, Ontario.

Among Dwyer's junior accolades including winning two Under-18 provincial titles (2010 and 2011), and representing Nova Scotia at the 2011 Canada Winter Games, finishing fourth on home ice at the Mayflower Curling Club. However, her biggest junior accomplishment was representing Nova Scotia at the 2012 Canadian Junior Curling Championships. She skipped her Nova Scotia rink to a 7–5 record, just missing the playoffs.

The 2014–15 season was the first season for Dwyer on the World Curling Tour (WCT). Her first event was the Gibson's Cashspiel played in her hometown of Lower Sackville. Her team won two games. In just her second ever WCT event, the 2014 Skyy Vodka Ladies Cashspiel, Dwyer and her rink won, defeating former World Champion Mary-Anne Arsenault in the final.

On March 30, 2020 Dwyer announced she had recovered from COVID-19.
