= Mackenzie Mitchell =

Canadian curler (born 2001)

- Curler
- Born: July 2, 2001 (age 25); Irishtown-Summerside, Newfoundland and Labrador

Team
- Curling club: Halifax CC, Halifax, NS
- Skip: Mackenzie Mitchell
- Third: Jessica Wiseman
- Second: Kristina Adams
- Lead: Stacie Curtis

Curling career
- Member Association: Newfoundland and Labrador (2016–2023; 2025–present); Nova Scotia (2023–2025)
- Hearts: 1 (2026)
- Top CTRS ranking: 83rd (2024–25)

Mackenzie Mitchell (born July 2, 2001, in Irishtown-Summerside, Newfoundland and Labrador) is a Canadian curler from Dartmouth, Nova Scotia. She currently skips her own team out of St. John's.

== Career ==
=== Juniors ===
Mitchell made her debut on the national stage at the 2019 Canada Winter Games, skipping her team of Sarah McNeil Lamswood, Mikayla O'Reilly and Ainsleigh Piercey. There, the team finished eighth with a 3–7 record, taking wins over New Brunswick, Prince Edward Island and Quebec. The following season, Mitchell and her new team of Katie Follett, Sarah Chaytor and Claire Hartlen won the Newfoundland and Labrador junior title, qualifying to represent the province at the 2020 Canadian Junior Curling Championships in Langley, British Columbia. After qualifying for the championship pool with a 4–2 record, the team lost their next four games to finish the tournament in eighth place. Also during the 2019–20 season, the team went undefeated through the round robin of the 2020 Newfoundland and Labrador Scotties Tournament of Hearts to earn a direct spot in the championship final. They were then defeated 8–2 by Erica Curtis.

Despite the COVID-19 pandemic cancelling most events during the 2020–21 season, Mitchell and her teammates were one of two teams to register for the 2021 Newfoundland and Labrador Scotties Tournament of Hearts. In a best-of-five series against Sarah Hill, Team Mitchell lost three games to one. The following season, her team represented the province twice at both the 2021 World Junior Qualification Event and the 2022 Canadian Junior Curling Championships. At the 2021 event, her team narrowly missed the playoffs with a 3–2 record while in 2022 she finished 4–4.

In her final season of juniors, Mitchell and her team of McNeil Lamswood, Kate Paterson and Emily Neary had a strong showing at the 2023 Canadian Junior Curling Championships, finishing first in their pool with a 7–1 record and earning a direct bye to the semifinals. There, they defeated Manitoba 7–6 to advance to the gold medal game. Facing Alberta's Myla Plett, the team gave up a pivotal steal of three in the fourth end, ultimately losing the game 10–4. Also that season, Mitchell and her teammates qualified to represent Memorial University of Newfoundland at the 2023 U Sports/Curling Canada University Curling Championships. There, they again qualified for the playoffs, earning the second seed with a 4–3 record. They then lost both the semifinal and bronze medal game, settling for fourth.

=== Women's ===
Following juniors, Mitchell moved to Nova Scotia and formed a new team with Kate Callaghan, Sarah Chaytor and Cate Fitzgerald. After failing to qualify in any of their tour events, the team had a strong showing at the 2024 Nova Scotia Scotties Tournament of Hearts, qualifying for the playoffs through the C Event. They then beat Tanya Hilliard in the 3 vs. 4 game before losing the semifinal to Christina Black, settling for third. The following year, Mitchell and Fitzgerald stayed together and picked up new teammates Taylour Stevens and Marlise Carter. This squad also found success at the provincial championship. After starting 0–2, they won five consecutive games to reach the championship final where they were once again defeated by Team Black.

For the 2025–26 season, Mitchell began skipping a new squad out of Newfoundland with third Jessica Wiseman, second Kristina Adams and lead Stacie Curtis. On tour, the team won their lone event, the Rick Rowsell Classic. They then continued this momentum into the 2026 Newfoundland and Labrador Women's Curling Championship where after a 3–3 start, the team won four consecutive sudden death matches to claim the provincial title. This earned Mitchell her first provincial title and sent the team to the 2026 Scotties Tournament of Hearts in Mississauga, Ontario.

=== Mixed doubles ===
In 2021, Mitchell competed in the 2021 Canadian Mixed Doubles Curling Championship alongside Greg Smith. The duo finished 4–2 in the round robin, qualifying Newfoundland and Labrador for the playoffs for the first time in the event's history. They then lost in the round of 12 qualifying round to Kadriana and Colton Lott, officially eliminating them from the tournament.

== Personal life ==
Mitchell is employed as a customer service advisor at Nutri-Lawn. She is married to fellow curler Joel Krats.

== Teams ==
Season	Skip	Third	Second	Lead
2016–17	Mackenzie Mitchell	Charlotte Cluney	Mikayla O'Reilly	Ainsleigh Piercey
2017–18	Mackenzie Mitchell	Sarah McNeil Lamswood	Mikayla O'Reilly	Ainsleigh Piercey
2018–19	Mackenzie Mitchell	Sarah McNeil Lamswood	Mikayla O'Reilly	Ainsleigh Piercey
2019–20	Mackenzie Mitchell	Katie Follett	Sarah Chaytor	Claire Hartlen
2020–21	Mackenzie Mitchell	Katie Follett	Sarah Chaytor	Claire Hartlen
2021–22	Mackenzie Mitchell	Katie Follett	Sarah Chaytor	Kate Paterson
2022–23	Mackenzie Mitchell	Sarah McNeil Lamswood	Kate Paterson	Emily Neary
2023–24	Mackenzie Mitchell	Kate Callaghan	Sarah Chaytor	Cate Fitzgerald
2024–25	Mackenzie Mitchell	Taylour Stevens	Marlise Carter	Cate Fitzgerald
2025–26	Mackenzie Mitchell	Jessica Wiseman	Kristina Adams	Stacie Curtis
