= WCF World Rankings =

World rankings of curling

The WCF World Rankings system is designed to track and list the amount of success achieved by each member association of the World Curling Federation (WCF) in a given curling season. The system, which was implemented in December 2006, is similar to the ranking system used by FIFA. The events taken into account when calculating each nation's score include the Olympic and Paralympic games, the World Curling Championships, and the various qualifying events for member associations who did not compete in the worlds. The system was developed by Patrick Hürlimann, who is a former Olympic champion and was the vice president of the WCF from 2010 to 2012. The calculation method was overhauled for the 2018–19 season.

== Current rankings ==
=== Women ===
Top 10 rankings for the 2025–26 season
Current rank	Country	Points	Change
1	Switzerland	84.651	Steady
2	Canada	77.442	Steady
3	Sweden	61.977	▲1
4	South Korea	45.256	▼1
5	Japan	31.442	Steady
6	China	29.735	▲5
7	Scotland	28.360	▼1
8	Italy	27.674	▲1
9	United States	26.279	▲1
10	Norway	26.140	▼3
Complete rankings at WCF

=== Men ===
Top 10 rankings for the 2025–26 season
Current rank	Country	Points	Change
1	Canada	84.105	▲1
2	Scotland	75.000	▼1
3	Sweden	59.349	Steady
4	Switzerland	52.372	Steady
5	United States	35.360	▲1
6	Italy	34.883	▼1
7	Germany	29.209	Steady
8	Norway	28.360	Steady
9	China	25.084	Steady
10	Japan	23.977	Steady
Complete rankings at WCF

=== Mixed doubles ===
Top 10 rankings for the 2025–26 season
Current rank	Country	Points	Change
1	Sweden	72.533	▲3
2	Italy	57.067	Steady
3	Scotland	49.280	▼2
4	Australia	49.213	▲5
5	Canada	46.933	▲2
6	United States	45.120	Steady
7	Estonia	40.720	▼2
8	Norway	38.933	▼5
9	Switzerland	31.013	▲3
10	Japan	29.040	Steady
Complete rankings at WCF

=== Wheelchair ===
Top 10 rankings for the 2025–26 season
Current rank	Country	Points	Change
1	China	85.091	Steady
2	Canada	83.182	Steady
3	South Korea	53.673	▲2
4	Sweden	52.727	▼1
5	Norway	50.836	▼1
6	Slovakia	30.800	▲1
7	Scotland	29.818	▼1
8	Latvia	28.218	▲1
9	Italy	27.564	▲1
10	United States	24.109	▼2
Complete rankings at WCF

=== Wheelchair mixed doubles ===
Top 10 rankings for the 2025–26 season
Current rank	Country	Points	Change
1	South Korea	69.200	Steady
2	China	66.545	▲4
3	Japan	53.309	▼1
4	Latvia	50.073	▼1
5	United States	45.091	Steady
6	Scotland	44.800	▼2
7	Estonia	38.964	Steady
8	Italy	29.418	▲1
9	Canada	21.236	▲1
10	Slovakia	20.727	▼2
Complete rankings at WCF

=== Mixed ===
Top 10 rankings for the 2024–25 season
Current rank	Country	Points	Change
1	Sweden	76.818	▲1
2	Canada	59.773	▼1
3	Switzerland	48.082	▲2
4	Japan	46.596	▲4
5	Spain	46.527	▼2
6	Norway	42.873	▼2
7	Scotland	29.936	Steady
8	Germany	25.636	▼2
9	United States	21.700	▲7
10	Poland	17.091	▲16
Complete rankings at WCF

== Current calculation method ==
The points are calculated for each member association based on performance during the last four curling seasons. Once points are distributed, the total for each member association is divided by the maximum number of points available.

Results in seasons prior to the current season are scaled by the following factors:

Years prior to current season	0	1	2	3
Scaling factor	100%	75%	60%	40%

=== Points distribution ===
Points are allocated based on the final rankings of each member association at an eligible event.

==== International events ====
The points distributions for the World Curling Championships and Olympic and Paralympic Games are given as follows:

Final rank	1	2	3	4	5	6	7	8	9	10	11	12	13
Points	240	200	180	150	120	110	100	90	80	70	60	50	45

==== Qualification events ====
Member associations that do not qualify for the Worlds are given points based on their performance in regional or qualifying events, from 45 points to 1 point. The distribution varies depending on the event.

== 2006–18 calculation method ==
The points are calculated for each nation based on performance during the last six curling seasons. Results in seasons prior to the current season are scaled by the following factors:

Years prior to current season	0	1	2	3	4	5
Scaling factor	100%	80%	60%	40%	30%	20%

=== Points distribution ===
Points are allocated based on the final rankings of each nation at an eligible event.

==== International events ====
The points distributions are given for each event as follows:

Winter Olympic Games
Final rank	1	2	3	4	5	6	7	8	9	10	11	12
Points	480	400	360	320	280	240	200	180	160	140	120	100

World Curling Championships
Final rank	1	2	3	4	5	6	7	8	9	10	11	12
Points	240	200	180	160	140	120	100	90	80	70	60	50

==== Regional events ====
All nations that qualify for the World Curling Championships receive 50 points, regardless of final ranking in regional events, if applicable.

Nations in the European or Pacific Curling Championships that do not qualify for the World Championships receive less than 50 points. Based on their final ranking in the tournament, nations receive 49 or fewer points, in decrements of 1 point.
