= 2012 Curlers Corner Autumn Gold Curling Classic =

- Host city: Calgary, Alberta
- Arena: Calgary Curling Club
- Dates: October 5–8
- Winner: (Ontario) Sherry Middaugh
- Curling club: Coldwater & District CC; Coldwater, Ontario
- Skip: Sherry Middaugh
- Third: Jo-Ann Rizzo
- Second: Lee Merklinger
- Lead: Leigh Armstrong
- Finalist: (Ontario) Rachel Homan

The 2012 Curlers Corner Autumn Gold Curling Classic was held from October 5 to 8 at the Calgary Curling Club in Calgary, Alberta as part of the 2012–13 World Curling Tour. It was the first women's Grand Slam event of the 2012–13 curling season, and this edition marked the twenty-seventh time the tournament has been held. The event was held in a 32-team triple-knockout event, and the purse for the event was CAD$54,000. In the final, Sherry Middaugh defeated Rachel Homan with a score of 8–4.

== Teams ==
Skip	Third	Second	Lead	Locale
Cathy Auld	Janet Murphy	Stephanie Gray	Melissa Foster	Mississauga, Ontario
Cheryl Bernard	Susan O'Connor	Lori Olson-Johns	Shannon Aleksic	Calgary, Alberta
Chelsea Carey	Kristy McDonald	Kristen Foster	Lindsay Titheridge	Winnipeg, Manitoba
Andrea Crawford	Rebecca Atkinson	Danielle Parsons	Jodie deSolla	Oromocto, New Brunswick
Laura Crocker	Sarah Wilkes	Rebecca Pattison	Jen Gates	Edmonton, Alberta
Lisa Eyamie	Maria Bushell	Jodi Marthaller	Valerie Hamende	High River, Alberta
Kerry Galusha	Sharon Cormier	Megan Cormier	Wendy Miller	Yellowknife, Northwest Territories
Amber Holland	Jolene Campbell	Brooklyn Lemon	Dailene Sivertson	Regina, Saskatchewan
Rachel Homan	Emma Miskew	Alison Kreviazuk	Lisa Weagle	Ottawa, Ontario
Tracy Horgan	Jenn Horgan	Jenna Enge	Amanda Gates	Sudbury, Ontario
Michèle Jäggi	Marisa Winkelhausen	Stéphanie Jäggi	Malanie Barbezät	Bern, Switzerland
Jessie Kaufman	Nicky Kaufman	Kelly Erickson	Cori Morris	Edmonton, Alberta
Shannon Kleibrink	Bronwen Webster	Kalynn Park	Chelsey Matson	Calgary, Alberta
Kaitlyn Lawes	Kirsten Wall	Jill Officer	Dawn Askin	Winnipeg, Manitoba
Stefanie Lawton	Sherry Anderson	Sherri Singler	Marliese Kasner	Saskatoon, Saskatchewan
Krista McCarville	Ashley Miharija	Kari Lavoie	Sarah Lang	Thunder Bay, Ontario
Sherry Middaugh	Jo-Ann Rizzo	Lee Merklinger	Leigh Armstrong	Coldwater, Ontario
Heather Nedohin	Beth Iskiw	Jessica Mair	Laine Peters	Edmonton, Alberta
Amy Nixon	Nadine Chyz	Whitney Eckstrand	Tracy Bush	Calgary/Red Deer, Alberta
Cathy Overton-Clapham	Jenna Loder	Ashley Howard	Breanne Meakin	Winnipeg, Manitoba
Trish Paulsen	Kari Kennedy	Sarah Collins	Kari Paulsen	Saskatoon, Saskatchewan
Jocelyn Peterman	Brittany Tran	Rebecca Konschuh	Kristine Anderson	Red Deer, Alberta
Cassie Potter	Jamie Haskell	Jackie Lemke	Steph Sambor	(United States) St. Paul, Minnesota
Allison Pottinger	Nicole Joraanstad	Natalie Nicholson	Tabitha Peterson	(United States) St. Paul, Minnesota
Leslie Rogers	Suzanne Walker	Jenilee Goertzen	Kelsey Latawiec	Edmonton, Alberta
Kelly Scott	Jeanna Schraeder	Sasha Carter	Sarah Wazney	Kelowna, British Columbia
Heather Smith-Dacey	Stephanie McVicar	Blisse Comstock	Teri Lake	Halifax, Nova Scotia
Renée Sonnenberg	Lawnie MacDonald	Cary-Anne Sallows	Rona Pasika	Edmonton, Alberta
Barb Spencer	Katie Spencer	Ainsley Champagne	Raunora Westcott	Winnipeg, Manitoba
Valerie Sweeting	Dana Ferguson	Joanne Taylor	Rachelle Pidherny	Edmonton, Alberta
Wang Bingyu	Liu Yin	Yue Qingshuang	Zhou Yan	Harbin, China
Crystal Webster	Erin Carmody	Geri-Lynn Ramsay	Samantha Preston	Calgary, Alberta

== Knockout Brackets ==
=== A Event ===
First Knockout
(Manitoba) Kaitlyn Lawes	8
(Alberta) Jocelyn Peterman	3
(Ontario) Rachel Homan	5
(Ontario) Krista McCarville	4
(Alberta) Cheryl Bernard	8
(Ontario) Cathy Auld	4
(Alberta) Renée Sonnenberg	5
(Nova Scotia) Heather Smith-Dacey	4
(Manitoba) Cathy Overton-Clapham	2
(Saskatchewan) Trish Paulsen	11
(Alberta) Valerie Sweeting	9
(United States) Allison Pottinger	1
(Saskatchewan) Stefanie Lawton	3
(United States) Cassie Potter	1
(Alberta) Shannon Kleibrink	7
(Manitoba) Barb Spencer	3

Quarterfinals
(Manitoba) Kaitlyn Lawes	5
(Ontario) Rachel Homan	6
(Alberta) Cheryl Bernard	7
(Alberta) Renée Sonnenberg	5
(Saskatchewan) Trish Paulsen	6
(Alberta) Valerie Sweeting	5
(Saskatchewan) Stefanie Lawton	4
(Alberta) Shannon Kleibrink	8

Semifinals
(Ontario) Rachel Homan	7
(Alberta) Cheryl Bernard	8
(Saskatchewan) Trish Paulsen	6
(Alberta) Shannon Kleibrink	7

Qualifier 1
(Alberta) Cheryl Bernard	2
(Alberta) Shannon Kleibrink	6

First Knockout
(Alberta) Heather Nedohin	9
(Alberta) Lisa Eyamie	3
(Alberta) Laura Crocker	2
(Alberta) Jessie Kaufman	5
(Alberta) Crystal Webster	4
(New Brunswick) Andrea Crawford	5
(Switzerland) Michèle Jäggi	9
(Saskatchewan) Amber Holland	5
(Ontario) Sherry Middaugh	10
(Northwest Territories) Kerry Galusha	2
(British Columbia) Kelly Scott	3
(Ontario) Tracy Horgan	7
(Manitoba) Chelsea Carey	8
(Alberta) Leslie Rogers	1
(China) Wang Bingyu	2
(Alberta) Amy Nixon	5

Quarterfinals
(Alberta) Heather Nedohin	8
(Alberta) Jessie Kaufman	3
(New Brunswick) Andrea Crawford	4
(Switzerland) Michèle Jäggi	7
(Ontario) Sherry Middaugh	9
(Ontario) Tracy Horgan	4
(Manitoba) Chelsea Carey	6
(Alberta) Amy Nixon	3

Semifinals
(Alberta) Heather Nedohin	4
(Switzerland) Michèle Jäggi	3
(Ontario) Sherry Middaugh	5
(Manitoba) Chelsea Carey	4

Qualifier 2
(Alberta) Heather Nedohin	5
(Ontario) Sherry Middaugh	6

=== B Event ===
Second Knockout
(Alberta) Jocelyn Peterman	6
(Ontario) Krista McCarville	2
(Nova Scotia) Heather Smith-Dacey	4
(Ontario) Cathy Auld	5

Quarterfinals
(Alberta) Amy Nixon	8
(Alberta) Jocelyn Peterman	3
(Ontario) Tracy Horgan	6
(Ontario) Cathy Auld	7

Semifinals
(Alberta) Amy Nixon	2
(Switzerland) Michèle Jäggi	7
(Ontario) Cathy Auld	6
(Saskatchewan) Trish Paulsen	3

To Qualifier 3
(Switzerland) Michèle Jäggi	3
(Ontario) Cathy Auld	8

Second Knockout
(Manitoba) Cathy Overton-Clapham	7
(United States) Allison Pottinger	6
(United States) Cassie Potter	1
(Manitoba) Barb Spencer	4

Quarterfinals
(New Brunswick) Andrea Crawford	8
(Manitoba) Cathy Overton-Clapham	5
(Alberta) Jessie Kaufman	7
(Manitoba) Barb Spencer	2

Semifinals
(New Brunswick) Andrea Crawford	7
(Alberta) Jessie Kaufman	2

To Qualifier 3
(New Brunswick) Andrea Crawford	5
(Alberta) Cheryl Bernard	6
Qualifier 3
(Ontario) Cathy Auld	6
(Alberta) Cheryl Bernard	2

Second Knockout
(Alberta) Lisa Eyamie	4
(Alberta) Laura Crocker	5
(Alberta) Crystal Webster	5
(Saskatchewan) Amber Holland	6

Quarterfinals
(Saskatchewan) Stefanie Lawton	7
(Alberta) Laura Crocker	1
(Alberta) Valerie Sweeting	8
(Saskatchewan) Amber Holland	3

Semifinals
(Saskatchewan) Stefanie Lawton	6
(Manitoba) Chelsea Carey	5
(Alberta) Valerie Sweeting	2
(Ontario) Rachel Homan	9

To Qualifier 4
(Saskatchewan) Stefanie Lawton	2
(Ontario) Rachel Homan	4

Second Knockout
(Northwest Territories) Kerry Galusha	1
(British Columbia) Kelly Scott	9
(Alberta) Leslie Rogers	7
(China) Wang Bingyu	4

Quarterfinals
(Alberta) Renée Sonnenberg	4
(British Columbia) Kelly Scott	7
(Manitoba) Kaitlyn Lawes	8
(Alberta) Leslie Rogers	2

Semifinals
(British Columbia) Kelly Scott	6
(Manitoba) Kaitlyn Lawes	3

To Qualifier 4
(British Columbia) Kelly Scott	7
(Alberta) Heather Nedohin	5
Qualifier 4
(Ontario) Rachel Homan	4
(British Columbia) Kelly Scott	3

=== C Event ===
Third Knockout
(Ontario) Krista McCarville	6
(Nova Scotia) Heather Smith-Dacey	2
(United States) Allison Pottinger	3
(United States) Cassie Potter	5

Quarterfinals
(Manitoba) Chelsea Carey	3
(Ontario) Krista McCarville	6
(Alberta) Valerie Sweeting	8
(United States) Cassie Potter	2

Semifinals
(Ontario) Krista McCarville	3
(Alberta) Valerie Sweeting	8

Qualifier 5
(Alberta) Valerie Sweeting	3
(Alberta) Cheryl Bernard	4

Third Knockout
(Manitoba) Cathy Overton-Clapham	6
(Manitoba) Barb Spencer	2

Quarterfinals
(Alberta) Jocelyn Peterman	3
(Ontario) Tracy Horgan	8
(Manitoba) Kaitlyn Lawes	5
(Manitoba) Cathy Overton-Clapham	2

Semifinals
(Ontario) Tracy Horgan	6
(Alberta) Heather Nedohin	5
(Manitoba) Kaitlyn Lawes	3
(Saskatchewan) Stefanie Lawton	6

Qualifier 6
(Ontario) Tracy Horgan	3
(Saskatchewan) Stefanie Lawton	8

Third Knockout
(Alberta) Renée Sonnenberg	4
(Alberta) Leslie Rogers	2

Quarterfinals
(Alberta) Jessie Kaufman	4
(Alberta) Renée Sonnenberg	3
(Alberta) Laura Crocker	5
(Saskatchewan) Amber Holland	4

Semifinals
(Alberta) Jessie Kaufman	6
(Switzerland) Michèle Jäggi	5
(Alberta) Laura Crocker	5
(New Brunswick) Andrea Crawford	4

Qualifier 7
(Alberta) Jessie Kaufman	5
(Alberta) Laura Crocker	6

Third Knockout
(Alberta) Lisa Eyamie	8
(Alberta) Crystal Webster	7
(Northwest Territories) Kerry Galusha	7
(China) Wang Bingyu	6

Quarterfinals
(Alberta) Amy Nixon	2
(Alberta) Lisa Eyamie	8
(Saskatchewan) Trish Paulsen	7
(Northwest Territories) Kerry Galusha	6

Semifinals
(Alberta) Lisa Eyamie	4
(Saskatchewan) Trish Paulsen	3

Qualifier 8
(Alberta) Lisa Eyamie	2
(British Columbia) Kelly Scott	4

== Playoffs ==
Quarterfinals
(Alberta) Shannon Kleibrink	6
(Saskatchewan) Stefanie Lawton	3
(Ontario) Rachel Homan	5
(Alberta) Cheryl Bernard	1
(British Columbia) Kelly Scott	8
(Ontario) Cathy Auld	3
(Alberta) Laura Crocker	4
(Ontario) Sherry Middaugh	7

Semifinals
(Alberta) Shannon Kleibrink	3
(Ontario) Rachel Homan	4
(British Columbia) Kelly Scott	6
(Ontario) Sherry Middaugh	9

Finals
(Ontario) Rachel Homan	3
(Ontario) Sherry Middaugh	6
