= 2010 Curlers Corner Autumn Gold Curling Classic =

- Host city: Calgary, Alberta
- Arena: Calgary Curling Club
- Dates: October 8–11
- Winner: (China) Wang Bingyu
- Curling club: Harbin CC, Harbin, China
- Skip: Wang Bingyu
- Third: Liu Yin
- Second: Yue Qingshuang
- Lead: Sun Yue
- Finalist: (Alberta) Desirée Owen

The 2010 Curlers Corner Autumn Gold Curling Classic was held from October 8 to 11 at the Calgary Curling Club in Calgary, Alberta. It was the 33rd edition of the event, and it marked the fifth time that the event was held as a Grand Slam event. The total purse of the event was CAD$52,000. The event featured 32 teams, six from outside Canada. The teams played in a triple knockout format, followed by a playoff round for the eight qualifiers from the knockout round.

The winning team was the Chinese national team (skipped by Wang Bingyu), which received CAD$14,000 in prize money. They defeated Desirée Owen in the final. It was the first time ever that a non-Canadian team won a Grand Slam event in either a men's or women's slam.

== Teams ==
Skip	Third	Second	Lead	Locale
Cheryl Bernard	Susan O'Connor	Carolyn Darbyshire	Cori Morris	Calgary, Alberta
Erika Brown	Nina Spatola	Ann Swisshelm	Laura Hallisey	(United States) Madison, Wisconsin
June Campbell	Shannon Nimmo	Sheri Pickering	Donna Phillips	Calgary, Alberta
Chelsea Carey	Kristy Jenion	Kristen Foster	Lindsay Titheridge	Morden, Manitoba
Michelle Corbeil	Dawn Corbeil	Krista Regnier	Lorena Ellsworth	Lloydminster, Alberta
Michelle Englot	Lana Vey	Roberta Materi	Deanna Doig	Regina, Saskatchewan
Lisa Eyamie	Jodi Marthaller	Nicole Bawel	Kyla MacLachlan	Calgary, Alberta
Kerri Flett	Janice Blair	Susan Baleja	Alison Harvey	Winnipeg, Manitoba
Kerry Galusha	Dawn Moses	Shona Barbour	Wendy Miller	Yellowknife, Northwest Territories
Amber Holland	Kim Schneider	Tammy Schneider	Kim Hodson	Kronau, Saskatchewan
Jennifer Jones	Kaitlyn Lawes	Jill Officer	Dawn Askin	Winnipeg, Manitoba
Andrea Kelly	Denise Nowlan	Jillian Babin	Lianne Sobey	Fredericton, New Brunswick
Shannon Kleibrink	Amy Nixon	Bronwen Webster	Chelsey Bell	Calgary, Alberta
Stefanie Lawton	Sherry Anderson	Sherri Singler	Marliese Kasner	Saskatoon, Saskatchewan
Eve Muirhead	Kelly Wood	Lorna Vevers	Annie Laird	Stirling, Scotland
Heather Nedohin	Beth Iskiw	Jessica Mair	Laine Peters	Edmonton, Alberta
Anna Ohmiya	Shinobu Aota	Mayo Yamaura	Kotomi Ishizaki	Aomori, Japan
Cathy Overton-Clapham	Beanne Meakin	Leslie Wilson	Raunora Westcott	Winnipeg, Manitoba
Desiree Owen	Kalynn Park	Cary-Anne Sallows	Stephanie Malekoff	Grande Prairie, Alberta
Allison Pottinger	Nicole Joraanstad	Natalie Nicholson	Sarah Lehman	(United States) Bemidji, Minnesota
Liudmila Privivkova	Margarita Fomina	Ekaterina Galkina	Nkeiruka Ezekh	Moscow, Russia
Heather Rankin	Glenys Bakker	Heather Jensen	Carly Quigley	Calgary, Alberta
Cindy Ricci	Jolene Campbell	Natalie Bloomfield	Kristy Johnson	Estevan, Saskatchewan
Bobbie Sauder	Kara Johnston-Newsted	Marie Miller	Rachelle Pidherny	Edmonton, Alberta
Casey Scheidegger	Allison Nimik	Jody Keim	Lace Dupont	Lethbridge, Alberta
Kelly Scott	Jeanna Schraeder	Sasha Carter	Jacquie Armstrong	Kelowna, British Columbia
Renee Sonnenberg	Lawnie MacDonald	Kristie Moore	Rona Pasika	Grande Prairie, Alberta
Valerie Sweeting	Megan Einarson	Whitney More	Leslie Rogers	Edmonton, Alberta
Adina Tasaka	Darah Provencal	Heather Beatty	Jennifer Armstrong	New Westminster, British Columbia
Wang Bingyu	Liu Yin	Yue Qingshuang	Sun Yue	Harbin, China
Crystal Webster	Lori Olson-Johns	Joanne Taylor	Samantha Preston	Calgary, Alberta
Tiffany Odegard	Faye White (skip)	Jennifer VanWieren	Heather Kushnir	Edmonton, Alberta

== Results ==
=== A Event ===
First Knockout
(Saskatchewan) Cindy Ricci	3
(Saskatchewan) Amber Holland	9
(New Brunswick) Andrea Kelly	6
(Alberta) Valerie Sweeting	7
(Alberta) Lisa Eyamie	6
(Russia) Liudmila Privivkova	6
(British Columbia) Adina Tasaka	5
(Alberta) Shannon Kleibrink	7
(Alberta) Bobbie Sauder	4
(Alberta) Crystal Webster	7
(Alberta) Faye White	4
(Saskatchewan) Stefanie Lawton	3
(United States) Erika Brown	6
(Saskatchewan) Michelle Englot	5
(Alberta) Michelle Corbeil	2
(Alberta) Cheryl Bernard	10

Quarterfinals
(Saskatchewan) Amber Holland	9
(Alberta) Valerie Sweeting	1
(Russia) Liudmila Privivkova	4
(Alberta) Shannon Kleibrink	5
(Alberta) Crystal Webster	7
(Alberta) Faye White	6
(United States) Erika Brown	3
(Alberta) Cheryl Bernard	5

Semifinals
(Saskatchewan) Amber Holland	7
(Alberta) Shannon Kleibrink	8
(Alberta) Crystal Webster	4
(Alberta) Cheryl Bernard	6

Qualifier 1
(Alberta) Shannon Kleibrink	4
(Alberta) Cheryl Bernard	6

First Knockout
(British Columbia) Kelly Scott	9
(Northwest Territories) Kerry Galusha	8
(United States) Allison Pottinger	5
(Japan) Anna Ohmiya	4
(China) Wang Bingyu	6
(Alberta) Casey Scheidegger	8
(Alberta) Heather Nedohin	7
(Alberta) Heather Rankin	5
(Scotland) Eve Muirhead	5
(Alberta) Renée Sonnenberg	4
(Manitoba) Cathy Overton-Clapham	3
(Alberta) Desiree Owen	5
(Manitoba) Keri Flett	3
(Manitoba) Chelsea Carey	5
(Alberta) June Campbell	3
(Manitoba) Jennifer Jones	7

Quarterfinals
(British Columbia) Kelly Scott	7
(United States) Allison Pottinger	8
(Alberta) Casey Scheidegger	7
(Alberta) Heather Nedohin	5
(Scotland) Eve Muirhead	9
(Alberta) Desiree Owen	5
(Manitoba) Chelsea Carey	2
(Manitoba) Jennifer Jones	7

Semifinals
(United States) Allison Pottinger	4
(Alberta) Casey Scheidegger	6
(Scotland) Eve Muirhead	6
(Manitoba) Jennifer Jones	8

Qualifier 2
(Alberta) Casey Scheidegger	2
(Manitoba) Jennifer Jones	6

=== B Event ===
Second Knockout
(Saskatchewan) Cindy Ricci	2
(New Brunswick) Andrea Kelly	8
(British Columbia) Adina Tasaka	11
(Alberta) Lisa Eyamie	4

Quarterfinals
(Manitoba) Chelsea Carey	5
(New Brunswick) Andrea Kelly	6
(Alberta) Desiree Owen	5
(British Columbia) Adina Tasaka	3

Semifinals
(New Brunswick) Andrea Kelly	3
(United States) Allison Pottinger	7
(Alberta) Desiree Owen
(Alberta) Crystal Webster

Finals
(United States) Allison Pottinger	1
(Alberta) Desiree Owen	5

Second Knockout
(Alberta) Bobbie Sauder	1
(Saskatchewan) Stefanie Lawton	7
(Saskatchewan) Michelle Englot	8
(Alberta) Michelle Corbeil	5

Quarterfinals
(Alberta) Heather Nedohin	5
(Saskatchewan) Stefanie Lawton	7
(British Columbia) Kelly Scott	6
(Saskatchewan) Michelle Englot	7

Semifinals
(Saskatchewan) Stefanie Lawton
(Saskatchewan) Michelle Englot

Finals
(Saskatchewan) Stefanie Lawton	6
(Alberta) Shannon Kleibrink	4
Qualifier 3
(Saskatchewan) Stefanie Lawton	3
(Alberta) Desiree Owen	5

Second Knockout
(Northwest Territories) Kerry Galusha	8
(Japan) Anna Ohmiya	5
(China) Wang Bingyu	9
(Alberta) Heather Rankin	1

Quarterfinals
(United States) Erika Brown	8
(Northwest Territories) Kerry Galusha	2
(Alberta) Faye White	1
(China) Bingyu Wang	6

Semifinals
(United States) Erika Brown	4
(Scotland) Eve Muirhead	2
(China) Wang Bingyu	6
(Saskatchewan) Amber Holland	4

Finals
(United States) Erika Brown	3
(China) Wang Bingyu	6

Second Knockout
(Alberta) Renée Sonnenberg	4
(Manitoba) Cathy Overton-Clapham	5
(Manitoba) Kerri Flett	9
(Alberta) June Campbell	1

Quarterfinals
(Russia) Liudmila Privivkova	4
(Manitoba) Cathy Overton-Clapham	7
(Alberta) Valerie Sweeting	8
(Manitoba) Kerri Flett	3

Semifinals
(Alberta) Valerie Sweeting	6
(Manitoba) Cathy Overton-Clapham	2

Finals
(Alberta) Valerie Sweeting	5
(Alberta) Casey Scheidegger	4
Qualifier 4
(China) Wang Bingyu	10
(Alberta) Valerie Sweeting	8

=== C Event ===
Third Knockout
(Saskatchewan) Cindy Ricci	7
(Alberta) Lisa Eyamie	4
(Alberta) Bobbi Sauder	10
(Alberta) Michelle Corbeil	6

Quarterfinals
(Saskatchewan) Cindy Ricci	4
(Scotland) Eve Muirhead	7
(Alberta) Bobbi Sauder	0
(Saskatchewan) Amber Holland	9

Semifinals
(Scotland) Eve Muirhead	4
(Saskatchewan) Amber Holland	9

Qualifier 5
(Saskatchewan) Amber Holland	3
(Saskatchewan) Stefanie Lawton	7

Third Knockout
(Alberta) Heather Nedohin	9
(British Columbia) Kelly Scott	6

Quarterfinals
(Manitoba) Chelsea Carey	8
(British Columbia) Adina Tasaka	4
(Alberta) Heather Nedohin	7
(Manitoba) Cathy Overton-Clapham	2

Semifinals
(Manitoba) Chelsea Carey	4
(Alberta) Casey Scheidegger	9
(Alberta) Heather Nedohin	7
(United States) Erika Brown	5

Qualifier 6
(Alberta) Casey Scheidegger	4
(Alberta) Heather Nedohin	9

Third Knockout
(Russia) Liudmila Privivkova	4
(Manitoba) Kerri Flett	7

Quarterfinals
(Manitoba) Kerri Flett	3
(Saskatchewan) Michelle Englot	9
(Northwest Territories) Kerry Galusha	5
(Alberta) Faye White	6

Semifinals
(Saskatchewan) Michelle Englot	8
(United States) Allison Pottinger	2
(Alberta) Faye White	2
(Alberta) Shannon Kleibrink	8

Qualifier 7
(Saskatchewan) Michelle Englot	3
(Alberta) Shannon Kleibrink	8

Third Knockout
(Japan) Anna Ohmiya	3
(Alberta) Heather Rankin	7
(Alberta) Renée Sonnenberg	3
(Alberta) June Campbell	6

Quarterfinals
(Alberta) Heather Rankin	7
(New Brunswick) Andrea Kelly	0
(Alberta) June Campbell	2
(Alberta) Crystal Webster	7

Semifinals
(Alberta) Heather Rankin	9
(Alberta) Crystal Webster	2

Qualifier 8
(Alberta) Heather Rankin	9
(Alberta) Valerie Sweeting	5

=== Playoffs ===
Quarterfinals
(Alberta) Cheryl Bernard	3
(Alberta) Heather Nedohin	6
(Saskatchewan) Stefanie Lawton	5
(China) Wang Bingyu	6
(Alberta) Desiree Owen	7
(Alberta) Heather Rankin	1
(Alberta) Shannon Kleibrink	3
(Manitoba) Jennifer Jones	8

Semifinals
(Alberta) Heather Nedohin	5
(China) Wang Bingyu	6
(Alberta) Desiree Owen	5
(Manitoba) Jennifer Jones	4

Finals
(China) Wang Bingyu	7
(Alberta) Desiree Owen	5
