= 2014 Scotties Tournament of Hearts =

- Host city: Montreal, Quebec
- Arena: Maurice Richard Arena
- Dates: February 1–9
- Attendance: 39,063
- Winner: Canada
- Curling club: Ottawa CC, Ottawa
- Skip: Rachel Homan
- Third: Emma Miskew
- Second: Alison Kreviazuk
- Lead: Lisa Weagle
- Alternate: Stephanie LeDrew
- Coach: Earle Morris
- Finalist: Alberta (Val Sweeting)

The 2014 Scotties Tournament of Hearts was held from February 1 to 9 at the Maurice Richard Arena in Montreal, Quebec. The defending champion Rachel Homan rink won their second straight title, with Homan becoming the youngest skip to ever win back-to-back championships. The team went undefeated throughout the tournament, with the team never even being forced to throw their final rock in any of their games.

== Teams ==
Returning as defending champions were the Rachel Homan rink from Ottawa, representing Team Canada as a result of winning the 2013 Scotties Tournament of Hearts. None of the other qualified teams had won the Scotties. Perhaps the next most decorated team in the event was 2000 Canadian Junior champion, three-time Canada Cup champion and four-time Grand Slam event winner Stefanie Lawton and her Saskatoon rink. The only other team in the event with a Grand Slam event win was team Manitoba, skipped by Chelsea Carey from Winnipeg, who was playing in her first Scotties. Carey qualified out of a Manitoba provincial which excluded the Jennifer Jones rink who were preparing to represent Canada at the 2014 Winter Olympics. Returning to the Scotties was 11-time Newfoundland and Labrador champion Heather Strong and her rink from St. John's as well as 11-time Prince Edward Island champion Kim Dolan and her Charlottetown rink. Also returning was 2005 Canadian Junior champion Andrea Crawford, from Oromocto, who represented New Brunswick for the 7th time. 2011 Scotties bronze medalist and 1991 Canadian junior champion Heather Smith (formerly Smith-Dacey) and her team from Halifax represented Nova Scotia for the 5th time. Allison Ross and her rink from Dollard-Des-Ormeaux represented the host province of Quebec, and played in her fourth Scotties. Val Sweeting and her rink from Edmonton played in her second Scotties representing Alberta. Making their Scotties debut was the 2012 British Columbia junior champion Kesa Van Osch rink from Victoria. 2009 Canadian Mixed champion Alli Flaxey (formerly Nimik) represented her adopted province of Ontario. Her team hails from Listowel, and included second Lynn Kreviazuk, sister of Team Canada second Alison. Finally, representing the Yukon/Northwest Territories was the Sarah Koltun rink from Whitehorse. Koltun, an eight-time territorial junior champion, was fresh from representing the Yukon at the 2014 Canadian Junior Curling Championships.

The teams are listed as follows:

Canada	Alberta	British Columbia
Ottawa CC, Ottawa Skip: Rachel Homan; Third: Emma Miskew; Second: Alison Kreviazuk; Lead: Lisa Weagle; Alternate: Stephanie LeDrew	Saville SC, Edmonton Skip: Val Sweeting; Third: Joanne Courtney; Second: Dana Ferguson; Lead: Rachelle Pidherny; Alternate: Renée Sonnenberg	Victoria CC, Victoria Skip: Kesa Van Osch (Note: For Draws 8 and 9, Patti Knezevic replaced Kesa Van Osch as skip due to Van Osch having a stomach flu. These games are listed with Knezevic being the official skip.); Third: Stephanie Baier; Second: Jessie Sanderson; Lead: Carley Sandwith; Alternate: Patti Knezevic
Manitoba	New Brunswick	Newfoundland and Labrador
Fort Rouge CC, Winnipeg Skip: Chelsea Carey; Third: Kristy McDonald; Second: Kristen Foster; Lead: Lindsay Titheridge; Alternate: Breanne Meakin	Gage G&CC, Oromocto Skip: Andrea Crawford; Third: Rebecca Atkinson; Second: Danielle Parsons; Lead: Jodie deSolla; Alternate: Jane Boyle	Bally Haly G&CC, St. John's Skip: Heather Strong; Third: Laura Strong; Second: Jessica Cunningham; Lead: Kathryn Cooper; Alternate: Noelle Thomas-Kennell
Nova Scotia	Ontario	Prince Edward Island
Mayflower CC, Halifax Skip: Heather Smith; Third: Jill Brothers; Second: Blisse Joyce; Lead: Teri Lake; Alternate: Stephanie McVicar	Listowel CC, Listowel Skip: Allison Flaxey; Third: Katie Cottrill; Second: Lynn Kreviazuk; Lead: Morgan Court; Alternate: Kim Tuck	Charlottetown CC, Charlottetown Skip: Kim Dolan; Third: Rebecca Jean MacDonald; Second: Sinead Dolan; Lead: Michala Robison; Alternate: Jackie Reid
Quebec	Saskatchewan	Yukon/Northwest Territories
Glenmore CC, Dollard-des-Ormeaux Skip: Allison Ross; Third: Melissa Gannon; Second: Brittany O'Rourke; Lead: Pamela Nugent; Alternate: Lisa Davies	Nutana CC, Saskatoon Skip: Stefanie Lawton; Third: Sherry Anderson; Second: Sherri Singler; Lead: Marliese Kasner; Alternate: Dailene Sivertson	Whitehorse CC, Whitehorse Skip: Sarah Koltun; Third: Chelsea Duncan; Second: Patty Wallingham; Lead: Andrea Sinclair; Alternate: Lindsay Moldowan

== Map of teams ==
Team Canada Provincial Winners

== Round robin standings ==
Final Round Robin Standings

Key
Teams to Playoffs

Locale	Skip	W	L	PF	PA	EW	EL	BE	SE	S%
Canada	Rachel Homan	11	0	94	43	49	32	14	17	90%
Manitoba	Chelsea Carey	9	2	79	54	48	37	18	13	85%
Saskatchewan	Stefanie Lawton	8	3	78	52	44	40	17	7	85%
Alberta	Val Sweeting	8	3	79	65	49	42	13	13	84%
New Brunswick	Andrea Crawford	6	5	59	68	42	41	21	11	80%
British Columbia	Kesa Van Osch	6	5	66	62	43	41	21	7	80%
Newfoundland and Labrador	Heather Strong	4	7	55	71	40	51	14	6	78%
Nova Scotia	Heather Smith	4	7	70	70	42	43	17	13	82%
Prince Edward Island	Kim Dolan	3	8	54	78	43	48	16	10	77%
Ontario	Allison Flaxey	3	8	64	73	42	49	13	7	82%
Quebec	Allison Ross	2	9	51	82	39	47	13	9	75%
Yukon/Northwest Territories	Sarah Koltun	2	9	52	81	38	47	13	7	76%

== Round robin results ==
All draw times are listed in Eastern Standard Time (UTC−5).

=== Draw 1 ===
Saturday, February 1, 2:00 pm

Sheet A	1	2	3	4	5	6	7	8	9	10	Final
Nova Scotia (Smith) 🔨	1	0	0	0	1	0	2	1	0	0	5
Newfoundland and Labrador (Strong)	0	3	0	2	0	1	0	0	1	1	8

Sheet B	1	2	3	4	5	6	7	8	9	10	Final
New Brunswick (Crawford) 🔨	0	1	0	0	1	1	3	0	X	X	6
Quebec (Ross)	0	0	0	0	0	0	0	1	X	X	1

Sheet C	1	2	3	4	5	6	7	8	9	10	11	Final
British Columbia (Van Osch)	0	1	0	0	0	0	2	1	0	0	3	7
Prince Edward Island (Dolan) 🔨	2	0	0	0	0	1	0	0	0	1	0	4

Sheet D	1	2	3	4	5	6	7	8	9	10	Final
Yukon/Northwest Territories (Koltun) 🔨	0	2	0	1	1	0	1	0	0	X	5
Alberta (Sweeting)	0	0	1	0	0	2	0	1	3	X	7

=== Draw 2 ===
Saturday, February 1, 7:00 pm

Sheet A	1	2	3	4	5	6	7	8	9	10	11	Final
Alberta (Sweeting) 🔨	2	0	0	0	2	0	1	0	1	0	2	8
British Columbia (Van Osch)	0	0	1	0	0	2	0	1	0	2	0	6

Sheet B	1	2	3	4	5	6	7	8	9	10	Final
Canada (Homan)	0	1	2	0	0	1	0	4	X	X	8
Manitoba (Carey) 🔨	0	0	0	0	1	0	2	0	X	X	3

Sheet C	1	2	3	4	5	6	7	8	9	10	Final
Quebec (Ross)	0	1	0	0	1	1	0	0	1	0	4
Newfoundland and Labrador (Strong) 🔨	1	0	0	1	0	0	1	0	0	2	5

Sheet D	1	2	3	4	5	6	7	8	9	10	Final
Ontario (Flaxey) 🔨	0	1	0	1	0	1	0	2	0	1	6
Saskatchewan (Lawton)	0	0	2	0	3	0	1	0	2	0	8

=== Draw 3 ===
Sunday, February 2, 9:00 am

Sheet A	1	2	3	4	5	6	7	8	9	10	Final
Manitoba (Carey)	0	0	1	0	0	0	1	1	0	2	5
Saskatchewan (Lawton) 🔨	0	0	0	0	0	3	0	0	1	0	4

Sheet B	1	2	3	4	5	6	7	8	9	10	Final
Prince Edward Island (Dolan)	0	0	1	0	0	1	1	0	X	X	3
Yukon/Northwest Territories (Koltun) 🔨	0	2	0	2	1	0	0	5	X	X	10

Sheet C	1	2	3	4	5	6	7	8	9	10	Final
Canada (Homan) 🔨	0	1	3	3	0	1	1	0	X	X	9
Ontario (Flaxey)	0	0	0	0	1	0	0	2	X	X	3

Sheet D	1	2	3	4	5	6	7	8	9	10	Final
Nova Scotia (Smith) 🔨	0	1	0	2	4	5	0	0	X	X	12
New Brunswick (Crawford)	0	0	1	0	0	0	0	1	X	X	2

=== Draw 4 ===
Sunday, February 2, 2:00 pm

Sheet A	1	2	3	4	5	6	7	8	9	10	Final
Quebec (Ross)	0	3	0	1	0	1	0	0	1	X	6
Canada (Homan) 🔨	3	0	3	0	2	0	0	1	0	X	9

Sheet B	1	2	3	4	5	6	7	8	9	10	11	Final
Ontario (Flaxey)	0	0	1	0	1	0	3	0	0	2	1	8
Newfoundland and Labrador (Strong) 🔨	0	2	0	1	0	1	0	1	2	0	0	7

Sheet C	1	2	3	4	5	6	7	8	9	10	Final
Saskatchewan (Lawton) 🔨	0	0	1	0	2	0	1	0	2	2	8
Alberta (Sweeting)	0	0	0	3	0	2	0	1	0	0	6

Sheet D	1	2	3	4	5	6	7	8	9	10	Final
Manitoba (Carey)	0	1	0	1	0	1	0	3	0	1	7
British Columbia (Van Osch) 🔨	1	0	2	0	1	0	1	0	1	0	6

=== Draw 5 ===
Sunday, February 2, 7:00 pm

Sheet A	1	2	3	4	5	6	7	8	9	10	Final
Newfoundland and Labrador (Strong) 🔨	1	0	2	0	0	1	1	1	0	0	6
Yukon/Northwest Territories (Koltun)	0	1	0	0	2	0	0	0	1	1	5

Sheet B	1	2	3	4	5	6	7	8	9	10	Final
Alberta (Sweeting)	0	0	0	0	0	3	1	0	1	0	5
Nova Scotia (Smith) 🔨	0	0	0	1	1	0	0	1	0	1	4

Sheet C	1	2	3	4	5	6	7	8	9	10	11	Final
New Brunswick (Crawford) 🔨	0	1	0	0	0	1	0	1	0	0	1	4
British Columbia (Van Osch)	0	0	0	0	0	0	1	0	0	2	0	3

Sheet D	1	2	3	4	5	6	7	8	9	10	11	Final
Prince Edward Island (Dolan) 🔨	1	0	0	2	1	1	0	0	0	1	1	7
Quebec (Ross)	0	1	1	0	0	0	1	1	2	0	0	6

=== Draw 6 ===
Monday, February 3, 2:00 pm

Sheet A	1	2	3	4	5	6	7	8	9	10	Final
Prince Edward Island (Dolan)	0	1	1	0	3	0	1	0	0	1	7
Ontario (Flaxey) 🔨	0	0	0	1	0	2	0	1	1	0	5

Sheet B	1	2	3	4	5	6	7	8	9	10	Final
New Brunswick (Crawford)	0	0	0	0	0	2	1	0	X	X	3
Saskatchewan (Lawton) 🔨	0	1	4	0	3	0	0	1	X	X	9

Sheet C	1	2	3	4	5	6	7	8	9	10	Final
Manitoba (Carey)	0	0	2	0	0	0	1	0	4	X	7
Nova Scotia (Smith) 🔨	0	2	0	1	0	0	0	0	0	X	3

Sheet D	1	2	3	4	5	6	7	8	9	10	Final
Canada (Homan) 🔨	0	0	3	1	1	0	4	0	X	X	9
Yukon/Northwest Territories (Koltun)	0	1	0	0	0	1	0	1	X	X	3

=== Draw 7 ===
Monday, February 3, 7:30 pm

Sheet A	1	2	3	4	5	6	7	8	9	10	11	Final
New Brunswick (Crawford)	0	2	0	1	0	0	2	0	0	3	0	8
Alberta (Sweeting) 🔨	2	0	1	0	0	1	0	2	2	0	1	9

Sheet B	1	2	3	4	5	6	7	8	9	10	Final
Newfoundland and Labrador (Strong) 🔨	0	2	0	1	0	1	0	0	0	2	6
Prince Edward Island (Dolan)	1	0	1	0	1	0	0	1	0	0	4

Sheet C	1	2	3	4	5	6	7	8	9	10	Final
Yukon/Northwest Territories (Koltun) 🔨	0	0	1	0	2	0	0	0	X	X	3
Quebec (Ross)	1	1	0	1	0	0	4	2	X	X	9

Sheet D	1	2	3	4	5	6	7	8	9	10	Final
British Columbia (Van Osch) 🔨	0	2	1	0	0	0	2	3	0	1	9
Nova Scotia (Smith)	1	0	0	1	1	3	0	0	2	0	8

=== Draw 8 ===
Tuesday, February 4, 9:00 am

Sheet A	1	2	3	4	5	6	7	8	9	10	Final
Saskatchewan (Lawton)	0	1	0	2	2	0	1	0	2	X	8
Quebec (Ross) 🔨	1	0	1	0	0	1	0	1	0	X	4

Sheet B	1	2	3	4	5	6	7	8	9	10	Final
British Columbia (Knezevic) 🔨	1	2	0	0	2	0	2	0	X	X	7
Ontario (Flaxey)	0	0	1	0	0	1	0	1	X	X	3

Sheet C	1	2	3	4	5	6	7	8	9	10	Final
Alberta (Sweeting) 🔨	1	0	1	0	1	0	2	0	X	X	5
Canada (Homan)	0	2	0	5	0	2	0	1	X	X	10

Sheet D	1	2	3	4	5	6	7	8	9	10	Final
Newfoundland and Labrador (Strong) 🔨	0	0	1	0	1	0	1	0	0	X	3
Manitoba (Carey)	0	1	0	1	0	1	0	1	1	X	5

=== Draw 9 ===
Tuesday, February 4, 2:00 pm

Sheet A	1	2	3	4	5	6	7	8	9	10	Final
Yukon/Northwest Territories (Koltun)	0	2	0	1	0	0	2	0	2	0	7
British Columbia (Knezevic) 🔨	1	0	2	0	0	1	0	2	0	2	8

Sheet B	1	2	3	4	5	6	7	8	9	10	Final
Nova Scotia (Smith)	0	0	2	0	3	1	0	2	2	X	10
Quebec (Ross) 🔨	0	1	0	3	0	0	1	0	0	X	5

Sheet C	1	2	3	4	5	6	7	8	9	10	Final
Newfoundland and Labrador (Strong)	0	0	0	0	1	0	0	3	1	1	6
New Brunswick (Crawford) 🔨	0	1	1	2	0	3	1	0	0	0	8

Sheet D	1	2	3	4	5	6	7	8	9	10	Final
Alberta (Sweeting) 🔨	0	2	1	2	0	2	0	1	0	X	8
Prince Edward Island (Dolan)	0	0	0	0	1	0	2	0	2	X	5

=== Draw 10 ===
Tuesday, February 4, 7:30 pm

Sheet A	1	2	3	4	5	6	7	8	9	10	Final
Canada (Homan) 🔨	1	0	1	2	0	3	3	0	X	X	10
Nova Scotia (Smith)	0	0	0	0	2	0	0	1	X	X	3

Sheet B	1	2	3	4	5	6	7	8	9	10	Final
Manitoba (Carey) 🔨	0	1	0	2	3	0	4	0	X	X	10
Yukon/Northwest Territories (Koltun)	0	0	1	0	0	1	0	2	X	X	4

Sheet C	1	2	3	4	5	6	7	8	9	10	Final
Prince Edward Island (Dolan) 🔨	0	0	0	1	0	1	0	1	0	X	3
Saskatchewan (Lawton)	0	0	1	0	3	0	2	0	1	X	7

Sheet D	1	2	3	4	5	6	7	8	9	10	Final
New Brunswick (Crawford)	0	0	1	0	1	1	0	0	3	1	7
Ontario (Flaxey) 🔨	0	1	0	2	0	0	0	1	0	0	4

=== Draw 11 ===
Wednesday, February 5, 9:00 am

Sheet A	1	2	3	4	5	6	7	8	9	10	Final
Alberta (Sweeting) 🔨	2	1	0	0	3	2	1	0	X	X	9
Newfoundland and Labrador (Strong)	0	0	0	2	0	0	0	3	X	X	5

Sheet B	1	2	3	4	5	6	7	8	9	10	Final
Prince Edward Island (Dolan)	0	0	1	0	2	0	1	0	2	0	6
New Brunswick (Crawford) 🔨	1	1	0	1	0	1	0	2	0	3	9

Sheet C	1	2	3	4	5	6	7	8	9	10	Final
Nova Scotia (Smith) 🔨	1	0	2	0	1	0	0	0	3	X	7
Yukon/Northwest Territories (Duncan)	0	1	0	0	0	1	1	0	0	X	3

Sheet D	1	2	3	4	5	6	7	8	9	10	Final
Quebec (Ross) 🔨	1	0	0	0	1	1	0	0	2	0	5
British Columbia (Van Osch)	0	0	1	2	0	0	0	2	0	1	6

=== Draw 12 ===
Wednesday, February 5, 2:00 pm

Sheet A	1	2	3	4	5	6	7	8	9	10	Final
Quebec (Ross)	0	1	0	0	0	0	2	0	X	X	3
Manitoba (Carey) 🔨	3	0	3	4	1	1	0	3	X	X	15

Sheet B	1	2	3	4	5	6	7	8	9	10	Final
Canada (Homan) 🔨	0	2	0	0	0	2	0	3	0	X	7
British Columbia (Van Osch)	0	0	1	0	1	0	1	0	0	X	3

Sheet C	1	2	3	4	5	6	7	8	9	10	Final
Ontario (Flaxey)	0	0	2	0	2	1	0	1	0	1	7
Alberta (Sweeting) 🔨	0	1	0	1	0	0	1	0	2	0	5

Sheet D	1	2	3	4	5	6	7	8	9	10	Final
Saskatchewan (Lawton)	1	0	0	2	2	0	1	0	1	X	7
Newfoundland and Labrador (Strong) 🔨	0	1	0	0	0	1	0	1	0	X	3

=== Draw 13 ===
Wednesday, February 5, 7:00 pm

Sheet A	1	2	3	4	5	6	7	8	9	10	Final
Ontario (Flaxey) 🔨	2	3	0	2	1	2	0	2	X	X	12
Yukon/Northwest Territories (Koltun)	0	0	1	0	0	0	1	0	X	X	2

Sheet B	1	2	3	4	5	6	7	8	9	10	Final
Saskatchewan (Lawton) 🔨	2	0	0	2	0	0	2	0	2	X	8
Nova Scotia (Smith)	0	1	0	0	2	2	0	1	0	X	6

Sheet C	1	2	3	4	5	6	7	8	9	10	Final
New Brunswick (Crawford)	0	1	0	1	0	1	0	0	1	0	4
Manitoba (Carey) 🔨	1	0	2	0	0	0	1	1	0	3	8

Sheet D	1	2	3	4	5	6	7	8	9	10	Final
Prince Edward Island (Dolan)	0	0	1	0	0	0	2	1	0	X	4
Canada (Homan) 🔨	1	3	0	1	0	3	0	0	1	X	9

=== Draw 14 ===
Thursday, February 6, 9:00 am

Sheet B	1	2	3	4	5	6	7	8	9	10	Final
Quebec (Ross)	0	0	0	1	0	1	0	1	X	X	3
Alberta (Sweeting) 🔨	2	3	2	0	2	0	1	0	X	X	10

Sheet C	1	2	3	4	5	6	7	8	9	10	Final
British Columbia (Van Osch) 🔨	0	0	1	2	0	0	3	0	1	X	7
Newfoundland and Labrador (Strong)	0	0	0	0	1	0	0	2	0	X	3

=== Draw 15 ===
Thursday, February 6, 2:00 pm

Sheet A	1	2	3	4	5	6	7	8	9	10	Final
Nova Scotia (Smith)	0	0	1	0	1	0	3	0	0	0	5
Prince Edward Island (Dolan) 🔨	2	1	0	1	0	1	0	1	0	1	7

Sheet B	1	2	3	4	5	6	7	8	9	10	11	Final
Ontario (Flaxey) 🔨	0	0	2	0	0	3	0	2	0	1	0	8
Manitoba (Carey)	1	0	0	1	1	0	2	0	3	0	1	9

Sheet C	1	2	3	4	5	6	7	8	9	10	Final
Saskatchewan (Lawton) 🔨	0	3	0	1	0	1	0	0	1	0	6
Canada (Homan)	0	0	2	0	1	0	2	1	0	1	7

Sheet D	1	2	3	4	5	6	7	8	9	10	Final
Yukon/Northwest Territories (Koltun)	0	0	0	1	0	1	0	1	1	0	4
New Brunswick (Crawford) 🔨	1	0	0	0	2	0	1	0	0	1	5

=== Draw 16 ===
Thursday, February 6, 7:30 pm

Sheet A	1	2	3	4	5	6	7	8	9	10	Final
British Columbia (Van Osch)	0	1	0	1	0	0	0	2	X	X	4
Saskatchewan (Lawton) 🔨	0	0	2	0	1	3	2	0	X	X	8

Sheet B	1	2	3	4	5	6	7	8	9	10	Final
Newfoundland and Labrador (Strong) 🔨	0	1	0	2	0	0	1	0	0	X	4
Canada (Homan)	3	0	1	0	1	2	0	1	1	X	9

Sheet C	1	2	3	4	5	6	7	8	9	10	Final
Quebec (Ross) 🔨	0	0	2	1	0	1	0	0	1	X	5
Ontario (Flaxey)	0	0	0	0	2	0	0	1	0	X	3

Sheet D	1	2	3	4	5	6	7	8	9	10	Final
Manitoba (Carey) 🔨	0	0	1	1	0	1	0	1	0	0	4
Alberta (Sweeting)	0	1	0	0	1	0	1	0	3	1	7

=== Draw 17 ===
Friday, February 7, 9:00 am

Sheet A	1	2	3	4	5	6	7	8	9	10	Final
Canada (Homan)	0	0	1	0	0	2	1	0	3	X	7
New Brunswick (Crawford) 🔨	0	0	0	0	2	0	0	1	0	X	3

Sheet B	1	2	3	4	5	6	7	8	9	10	Final
Yukon/Northwest Territories (Koltun)	0	0	1	0	1	1	0	2	0	1	6
Saskatchewan (Lawton) 🔨	0	3	0	1	0	0	1	0	0	0	5

Sheet C	1	2	3	4	5	6	7	8	9	10	Final
Manitoba (Carey) 🔨	1	0	0	0	2	0	0	1	0	2	6
Prince Edward Island (Dolan)	0	0	0	2	0	1	0	0	1	0	4

Sheet D	1	2	3	4	5	6	7	8	9	10	Final
Ontario (Flaxey)	0	0	1	0	0	2	0	0	1	2	6
Nova Scotia (Smith) 🔨	0	1	0	1	2	0	2	1	0	0	7

== Playoffs ==
Page playoff system
1	Canada	5
2	Manitoba	4
3	Saskatchewan	7
4	Alberta	8

Semifinal
2	Manitoba	5
4	Alberta	6

Final
1	Canada	8
4	Alberta	6

Bronze Medal Game
3	Saskatchewan	3
2	Manitoba	7

=== 1 vs. 2 ===
Friday, February 7, 7:30 pm

Team	1	2	3	4	5	6	7	8	9	10	Final
Canada (Homan) 🔨	0	3	0	0	0	0	1	0	0	1	5
Manitoba (Carey)	0	0	0	1	1	1	0	1	0	0	4

Player percentages
Canada		Manitoba	
Lisa Weagle	96%	Lindsay Titheridge	90%
Alison Kreviazuk	91%	Kristen Foster	85%
Emma Miskew	84%	Kristy McDonald	93%
Rachel Homan	87%	Chelsea Carey	90%
Total	90%	Total	89%

=== 3 vs. 4 ===
Saturday, February 8, 11:00 am

Team	1	2	3	4	5	6	7	8	9	10	Final
Saskatchewan (Lawton) 🔨	1	0	0	1	1	0	0	0	2	2	7
Alberta (Sweeting)	0	1	0	0	0	2	2	3	0	0	8

Player percentages
Saskatchewan		Alberta	
Marliese Kasner	93%	Rachelle Pidherny	89%
Sherri Singler	89%	Dana Ferguson	90%
Sherry Anderson	90%	Joanne Courtney	80%
Stefanie Lawton	81%	Val Sweeting	81%
Total	88%	Total	85%

=== Semifinal ===
Saturday, February 8, 4:00 pm

Team	1	2	3	4	5	6	7	8	9	10	11	Final
Manitoba (Carey) 🔨	0	1	0	1	0	0	0	2	0	1	0	5
Alberta (Sweeting)	0	0	1	0	0	2	1	0	1	0	1	6

Player percentages
Manitoba		Alberta	
Lindsay Titheridge	86%	Rachelle Pidherny	92%
Kristen Foster	84%	Dana Ferguson	83%
Kristy McDonald	77%	Joanne Courtney	84%
Chelsea Carey	85%	Val Sweeting	89%
Total	83%	Total	87%

=== Bronze medal game ===
Sunday, February 9, 2:30 pm

Team	1	2	3	4	5	6	7	8	9	10	Final
Saskatchewan (Lawton)	0	0	0	2	0	1	0	0	0	0	3
Manitoba (Carey) 🔨	0	1	0	0	1	0	0	2	0	3	7

Player percentages
Saskatchewan		Manitoba	
Marliese Kasner	90%	Lindsay Titheridge	89%
Sherri Singler	76%	Kristen Foster	80%
Sherry Anderson	83%	Kristy McDonald	69%
Stefanie Lawton	81%	Chelsea Carey	88%
Total	83%	Total	81%

=== Final ===
Sunday, February 9, 7:30 pm

Team	1	2	3	4	5	6	7	8	9	10	Final
Canada (Homan) 🔨	0	3	0	2	0	1	0	2	0	X	8
Alberta (Sweeting)	0	0	2	0	1	0	2	0	1	X	6

Player percentages
Canada		Alberta	
Lisa Weagle	86%	Rachelle Pidherny	95%
Alison Kreviazuk	76%	Dana Ferguson	76%
Emma Miskew	85%	Joanne Courtney	83%
Rachel Homan	89%	Val Sweeting	71%
Total	84%	Total	81%

== Statistics ==
=== Top 5 player percentages ===
After Draw 17

Leads	%
(Nova Scotia) Teri Lake	90
(Ontario) Morgan Court	89
(Canada) Lisa Weagle	88
(Manitoba) Lindsay Titheridge	88
(Alberta) Rachelle Pidherny	88

Seconds	%
(Canada) Alison Kreviazuk	90
(Saskatchewan) Sherri Singler	88
(British Columbia) Jessie Sanderson	85
(Alberta) Dana Ferguson	84
(Manitoba) Kristen Foster	84

Thirds	%
(Canada) Emma Miskew	91
(Saskatchewan) Sherry Anderson	85
(Alberta) Joanne Courtney	83
(Ontario) Katie Cottrill	82
(Manitoba) Kristy McDonald	82

Skips	%
(Canada) Rachel Homan	90
(Manitoba) Chelsea Carey	85
(Saskatchewan) Stefanie Lawton	84
(Alberta) Val Sweeting	82
(Nova Scotia) Heather Smith	78

=== Perfect games ===
Player	Team	Position	Shots	Opponent
Stefanie Lawton	Saskatchewan	Skip	18	Quebec
Rachel Homan	Canada	Skip	18	Newfoundland and Labrador
Teri Lake	Nova Scotia	Lead	16	Ontario

== Awards ==
The awards and all-star teams are as follows:

All-Star Teams

First Team

- Skip: Rachel Homan, Canada
- Third: Emma Miskew, Canada
- Second: Alison Kreviazuk, Canada
- Lead: Teri Lake, Nova Scotia

Second Team

- Skip: Chelsea Carey, Manitoba
- Third: Sherry Anderson, Saskatchewan
- Second: Sherri Singler, Saskatchewan
- Lead: Morgan Court, Ontario

Marj Mitchell Sportsmanship Award

- Sherry Anderson, Saskatchewan

Joan Mead Builder Award

- Linda Moore, colour commentator for TSN

== Provincial and territorial playdowns ==
- 2014 Alberta Scotties Tournament of Hearts
- 2014 British Columbia Scotties Tournament of Hearts
- 2014 Manitoba Scotties Tournament of Hearts
- 2014 New Brunswick Scotties Tournament of Hearts
- 2014 Newfoundland and Labrador Scotties Tournament of Hearts
- 2014 Nova Scotia Scotties Tournament of Hearts
- 2014 Ontario Scotties Tournament of Hearts
- 2014 Prince Edward Island Scotties Tournament of Hearts
- 2014 Quebec Scotties Tournament of Hearts
- 2014 Saskatchewan Scotties Tournament of Hearts
- (Northwest Territories) 2014 NWT/Yukon Scotties Tournament of Hearts
