= 2013 Quebec Scotties Tournament of Hearts =

- Host city: Victoriaville, Quebec
- Arena: Centre sportif Victoriaville
- Dates: January 22–27
- Winner: Allison Ross
- Curling club: Glenmore CC, Dollard-des-Ormeaux
- Skip: Allison Ross
- Third: Audree Dufresne
- Second: Brittany O'Rourke
- Lead: Sasha Beauchamp
- Finalist: Ève Bélisle

The 2013 Quebec Scotties Tournament of Hearts was held from January 22 to 27 at the Centre sportif Victoriaville in Victoriaville, Quebec. The winning team represented Quebec at the 2013 Scotties Tournament of Hearts in Kingston, Ontario,

== Qualification ==
Qualification method	Berths	Qualifying team
Quebec Championship points finish – first place	1	Marie-France Larouche
Quebec Championship points finish – second place	1	Allison Ross
Quebec Championship points finish – third place	1	Julie Hamel
Quebec Championship points finish – fourth place	1	Roxane Perron
Regional Qualifier Montréal	2	Mélanie Bernier; Brigitte Gosselin
Regional Qualifier Estrie	2	Sian Canavan; Ève Bélisle

== Teams ==
The teams are listed as follows:

Skip	Third	Second	Lead	Club(s)
Marie-France Larouche	Brenda Nicholls	Véronique Grégoire	Amélie Blais	Club de curling Etchemin, Saint-Romuald
Allison Ross	Audrée Dufresne	Brittany O'Rourke	Sasha Beauchamp	Glenmore Curling Club, Dollard-des-Ormeaux
Julie Hamel	Alanna Routledge	Marie-Pier Côté	Joëlle St-Hilaire	Glenmore Curling Club, Dollard-des-Ormeaux
Roxane Perron	Marie-Josée Fortier	Sonia Delisle	Marie-France Paul	Club de curling Trois-Rivières, Trois-Rivières; Club de curling Aurèle-Racine, Sorel-Tracy
Mélanie Bernier	Marie-Lise Bernier	Chantal Thibodeau	Marie-Claude Trottier	Club de curling Laurier, Victoriaville
Brigitte Gosselin	Chantal Ouellette	Céline Bouffard	Dany Roy	Club de curling Sherbrooke, Sherbrooke
Sian Canavan	Amanda Belliveau	Marion Van Horn	Audrée Debay	Club de curling Longue-Pointe, Montreal
Ève Bélisle	Joëlle Belley	Martine Comeau	Laura Thomas	TMR Curling Club, Mont-Royal; Glenmore Curling Club, Dollard-des-Ormeaux

== Round-robin standings ==
Final round-robin standings

Key
Teams to Playoffs
Teams to Tiebreakers

Skip (Club)	W	L	PF	PA
Allison Ross (Glenmore)	7	0	60	23
Julie Hamel (Glenmore)	6	1	60	33
Ève Bélisle (TMR/Glenmore)	4	3	53	41
Sian Canavan (Longue-Pointe)	4	3	48	41
Roxane Perron (Trois-Rivières/Aurèle-Racine)	4	3	41	38
Marie-France Larouche (Etchemin)	2	5	55	45
Brigitte Gosselin (Sherbrooke)	1	6	16	47
Mélanie Bernier (Laurier)	0	7	18	75

== Round-robin results ==
All draw times are listed in Eastern Standard Time (UTC−5).

=== Draw 1 ===
Tuesday, January 22, 12:00

Sheet A	1	2	3	4	5	6	7	8	9	10	Final
Mélanie Bernier	0	0	1	0	0	0	X	X	X	X	1
Julie Hamel	4	4	0	1	1	2	X	X	X	X	12

Sheet B	1	2	3	4	5	6	7	8	9	10	Final
Brigitte Gosselin	0	0	1	0	1	0	X	X	X	X	2
Marie-France Larouche	1	2	0	4	0	6	X	X	X	X	13

Sheet C	1	2	3	4	5	6	7	8	9	10	Final
Allison Ross	0	0	0	1	0	2	0	1	2	1	7
Roxane Perron	0	1	1	0	1	0	1	0	0	0	4

Sheet D	1	2	3	4	5	6	7	8	9	10	Final
Ève Bélisle	2	0	1	0	1	0	1	0	1	0	6
Sian Canavan	0	2	0	0	0	1	0	2	0	4	9

=== Draw 2 ===
Tuesday, January 22, 19:30

Sheet A	1	2	3	4	5	6	7	8	9	10	Final
Ève Bélisle	0	1	1	0	4	2	0	3	X	X	11
Brigitte Gosselin	1	0	0	1	0	0	1	0	X	X	3

Sheet B	1	2	3	4	5	6	7	8	9	10	Final
Julie Hamel	1	0	3	0	3	1	0	2	X	X	10
Roxane Perron	0	1	0	1	0	0	3	0	X	X	5

Sheet C	1	2	3	4	5	6	7	8	9	10	Final
Sian Canavan	0	1	0	1	2	0	4	0	1	X	9
Marie-France Larouche	0	0	3	0	0	1	0	2	0	X	6

Sheet D	1	2	3	4	5	6	7	8	9	10	Final
Mélanie Bernier	0	0	0	0	2	X	X	X	X	X	2
Allison Ross	4	1	5	2	0	X	X	X	X	X	12

=== Draw 3 ===
Wednesday, January 23, 12:00

Sheet A	1	2	3	4	5	6	7	8	9	10	Final
Marie-France Larouche	0	2	0	2	0	0	0	2	0	X	6
Roxane Perron	1	0	1	0	1	1	2	0	2	X	8

Sheet B	1	2	3	4	5	6	7	8	9	10	Final
Allison Ross	3	1	5	0	3	X	X	X	X	X	12
Sian Canavan	0	0	0	1	0	X	X	X	X	X	1

Sheet C	1	2	3	4	5	6	7	8	9	10	Final
Mélanie Bernier	0	1	0	1	0	1	0	0	X	X	3
Ève Bélisle	5	0	2	0	1	0	1	2	X	X	11

Sheet D	1	2	3	4	5	6	7	8	9	10	Final
Brigitte Gosselin	0	1	0	0	1	0	0	0	X	X	2
Julie Hamel	2	0	2	2	0	2	1	1	X	X	10

=== Draw 4 ===
Wednesday, January 23, 19:30

Sheet A	1	2	3	4	5	6	7	8	9	10	Final
Brigitte Gosselin	0	1	0	0	0	0	X	X	X	X	1
Sian Canavan	1	0	6	1	1	1	X	X	X	X	10

Sheet B	1	2	3	4	5	6	7	8	9	10	Final
Ève Bélisle	0	0	2	2	0	0	2	1	0	1	8
Marie-France Larouche	0	2	0	0	1	1	0	0	3	0	7

Sheet C	1	2	3	4	5	6	7	8	9	10	Final
Julie Hamel	0	1	0	1	0	1	0	1	0	X	4
Allison Ross	0	0	2	0	2	0	2	0	1	X	7

Sheet D	1	2	3	4	5	6	7	8	9	10	Final
Roxane Perron	1	1	0	3	0	0	1	6	X	X	12
Mélanie Bernier	0	0	2	0	3	1	0	0	X	X	6

=== Draw 5 ===
Thursday, January 24, 8:15

Sheet A	1	2	3	4	5	6	7	8	9	10	11	Final
Roxane Perron	0	0	0	1	0	1	0	1	0	2	0	5
Ève Bélisle	1	1	1	0	1	0	0	0	1	0	2	7

Sheet B	1	2	3	4	5	6	7	8	9	10	Final
Sian Canavan	0	2	0	0	0	1	0	2	1	X	6
Julie Hamel	0	0	1	2	4	0	1	0	0	X	8

Sheet C	1	2	3	4	5	6	7	8	9	10	Final
Marie-France Larouche	1	3	0	3	0	4	X	X	X	X	11
Mélanie Bernier	0	0	1	0	1	0	X	X	X	X	2

Sheet D	1	2	3	4	5	6	7	8	9	10	Final
Allison Ross	2	3	1	1	0	X	X	X	X	X	7
Brigitte Gosselin	0	0	0	0	1	X	X	X	X	X	1

=== Draw 6 ===
Thursday, January 24, 15:45

Sheet A	1	2	3	4	5	6	7	8	9	10	Final
Sian Canavan	2	1	2	2	3	X	X	X	X	X	10
Mélanie Bernier	0	0	0	0	0	X	X	X	X	X	0

Sheet B	1	2	3	4	5	6	7	8	9	10	Final
Ève Bélisle	3	0	0	0	0	0	1	0	1	X	5
Allison Ross	0	2	0	0	3	2	0	1	0	X	8

Sheet C	1	2	3	4	5	6	7	8	9	10	11	Final
Roxane Perron	0	0	2	0	2	0	2	1	0	1	X	8
Brigitte Gosselin	1	1	0	2	0	1	0	0	2	0	X	7

Sheet D	1	2	3	4	5	6	7	8	9	10	Final
Julie Hamel	0	0	2	1	0	1	0	2	1	2	9
Marie-France Larouche	2	0	0	0	2	0	2	0	0	0	6

=== Draw 7 ===
Friday, January 25, 14:15

Sheet A	1	2	3	4	5	6	7	8	9	10	Final
Allison Ross	0	0	0	0	2	1	0	2	1	1	7
Marie-France Larouche	1	2	1	1	0	0	1	0	0	0	6

Sheet B	1	2	3	4	5	6	7	8	9	10	Final
Mélanie Bernier	0	0	0	1	0	1	0	1	0	1	4
Brigitte Gosselin	0	2	1	0	1	0	2	0	1	0	7

Sheet C	1	2	3	4	5	6	7	8	9	10	11	Final
Ève Bélisle	0	1	0	2	0	0	0	1	0	2	0	6
Julie Hamel	0	0	2	0	0	2	0	0	2	0	1	7

Sheet D	1	2	3	4	5	6	7	8	9	10	Final
Sian Canavan	0	1	0	1	0	0	1	0	X	X	3
Roxane Perron	0	0	2	0	3	1	0	2	X	X	8

== Tiebreakers ==
Saturday, January 26, 14:00

Sheet A	1	2	3	4	5	6	7	8	9	10	Final
Sian Canavan	1	1	2	0	2	0	1	X	X	X	7
Roxane Perron	0	0	0	1	0	1	0	X	X	X	2

Saturday, January 26, 19:00

Sheet A	1	2	3	4	5	6	7	8	9	10	Final
Sian Canavan	0	0	1	0	0	0	0	X	X	X	1
Ève Bélisle	1	1	0	1	2	1	1	X	X	X	7

== Playoffs ==
Semifinal			Final
			1	Allison Ross	11
2	Julie Hamel	6	3	Ève Bélisle	4
3	Ève Bélisle	9

=== Semifinals ===
Sunday, January 27, 9:00

Team	1	2	3	4	5	6	7	8	9	10	Final
Julie Hamel	1	0	1	0	0	0	2	0	2	0	6
Ève Bélisle	0	1	0	2	2	2	0	1	0	1	9

=== Final ===
Sunday, January 27, 14:00

Team	1	2	3	4	5	6	7	8	9	10	Final
Allison Ross	2	1	0	2	1	0	0	3	2	X	11
Ève Bélisle	0	0	1	0	0	1	2	0	0	X	4
