= 2014 New Brunswick Scotties Tournament of Hearts =

- Host city: Saint John, New Brunswick
- Arena: Thistle St. Andrews Curling Club
- Dates: January 8–12
- Winner: Andrea Crawford
- Curling club: Gage G&CC, Oromocto
- Skip: Andrea Crawford
- Third: Rebecca Atkinson
- Second: Danielle Parsons
- Lead: Jodie deSolla
- Finalist: Sylvie Robichaud

The 2014 New Brunswick Scotties Tournament of Hearts, the provincial women's curling championship for New Brunswick, was held from January 8 to 12 at the Thistle St. Andrews Curling Club in Saint John. The winning team of Andrea Crawford represented New Brunswick at the 2014 Scotties Tournament of Hearts in Montreal.

== Teams ==
Skip	Third	Second	Lead	Alternate	Club(s)
Melissa Adams	Jaclyn Crandall	Abby Burgess	Shelby Wilson	Shannon Tatlock	Capital Winter Club, Fredericton
Andrea Crawford	Rebecca Atkinson	Danielle Parsons	Jodie deSolla		Gage Golf & Curling Club, Oromocto
Amy MacDonald	Amanda Belyea	Sarah Brown	Margo McLeod		Woodstock Golf & Curling Club, Woodstock
Sarah Mallais	Leah Thompson	Michaela Downey	Kim Dow		Thistle St. Andrews Curling Club, Saint John
Stacey McCormack Lacey	Stacey Leger	Carol Whitaker	Jane Boyle		Thistle St. Andrews Curling Club, Saint John
Sylvie Robichaud	Mary Jane McGuire	Megan McGuire	Marie Richard	Kendra Lister	Curl Moncton, Moncton

== Round-robin standings ==
Final round-robin standings

Key
Teams to Playoffs

Skip (Club)	W	L
Andrea Crawford (Gage)	4	1
Sylvie Robichaud (Curl Moncton)	4	1
Stacey McCormack Lacey (Thistle St. Andrews)	4	1
Melissa Adams (Capital)	2	3
Sarah Mallais (Thistle St. Andrews)	1	4
Amy MacDonald (Woodstock)	0	5

Crawford received first place and a bye to the final by virtue of having the best last shot draw average through the round-robin.

== Round-robin results ==
=== Draw 1 ===
Thursday, January 9, 2:00 pm

Sheet 4	1	2	3	4	5	6	7	8	9	10	Final
Amy MacDonald	0	0	0	1	0	0	X	X	X	X	1
Melissa Adams	3	2	4	0	2	3	X	X	X	X	14

Sheet 6	1	2	3	4	5	6	7	8	9	10	Final
Sylvie Robichaud	3	0	0	2	0	3	0	0	3	X	11
Sarah Mallais	0	0	1	0	1	0	2	1	0	X	5

Sheet 7	1	2	3	4	5	6	7	8	9	10	Final
Andrea Crawford	0	1	0	1	0	1	0	1	0	X	4
Stacey McCormack Lacey	3	0	1	0	1	0	2	0	3	X	10

=== Draw 2 ===
Thursday, January 9, 7:00 pm

Sheet 4	1	2	3	4	5	6	7	8	9	10	Final
Stacey McCormack Lacey	0	0	1	0	2	0	1	0	0	X	4
Sylvie Robichaud	1	1	0	2	0	1	0	1	3	X	9

Sheet 5	1	2	3	4	5	6	7	8	9	10	Final
Amy MacDonald	1	0	0	1	0	0	1	1	0	X	4
Andrea Crawford	0	1	2	0	2	3	0	0	3	X	11

Sheet 7	1	2	3	4	5	6	7	8	9	10	Final
Melissa Adams	2	1	0	1	1	2	0	1	X	X	8
Sarah Mallais	0	0	0	0	0	0	1	0	X	X	1

=== Draw 3 ===
Friday, January 10, 2:00 pm

Sheet 4	1	2	3	4	5	6	7	8	9	10	Final
Sarah Mallais	0	0	0	0	0	0	X	X	X	X	0
Andrea Crawford	0	2	2	1	2	2	X	X	X	X	9

Sheet 5	1	2	3	4	5	6	7	8	9	10	Final
Sylvie Robichaud	1	0	2	0	2	0	0	1	0	2	8
Melissa Adams	0	1	0	1	0	1	1	0	1	0	5

Sheet 6	1	2	3	4	5	6	7	8	9	10	Final
Amy MacDonald	1	0	2	0	2	0	0	2	0	X	7
Stacey McCormack Lacey	0	3	0	5	0	1	0	0	2	X	11

=== Draw 4 ===
Friday, January 10, 7:00 pm

Sheet 5	1	2	3	4	5	6	7	8	9	10	Final
Stacey McCormack Lacey	0	2	0	2	0	0	2	1	1	2	10
Sarah Mallais	3	0	1	0	1	1	0	0	0	0	6

Sheet 6	1	2	3	4	5	6	7	8	9	10	Final
Andrea Crawford	0	2	0	1	0	1	0	1	1	0	6
Melissa Adams	1	0	0	0	2	0	1	0	0	1	5

Sheet 7	1	2	3	4	5	6	7	8	9	10	Final
Sylvie Robichaud	3	2	0	3	2	0	3	X	X	X	13
Amy MacDonald	0	0	1	0	0	1	0	X	X	X	2

=== Draw 5 ===
Saturday, January 11, 8:00 am

Sheet 4	1	2	3	4	5	6	7	8	9	10	Final
Melissa Adams	0	0	0	1	0	1	0	X	X	X	2
Stacey McCormack Lacey	0	3	4	0	2	0	4	X	X	X	13

Sheet 5	1	2	3	4	5	6	7	8	9	10	Final
Andrea Crawford	0	2	1	1	0	0	0	2	0	1	7
Sylvie Robichaud	1	0	0	0	2	0	1	0	2	0	6

Sheet 6	1	2	3	4	5	6	7	8	9	10	Final
Sarah Mallais	1	0	3	0	3	0	1	1	0	X	9
Amy MacDonald	0	2	0	1	0	2	0	0	2	X	7

== Playoffs ==
Semifinal			Final
			1	Andrea Crawford	8
2	Sylvie Robichaud	10	2	Sylvie Robichaud	7
3	Stacey McCormack Lacey	4

=== Semifinal ===
Saturday, January 11, 7:00 pm

Team	1	2	3	4	5	6	7	8	9	10	Final
Sylvie Robichaud	2	0	2	0	2	0	0	2	2	X	10
Stacey McCormack Lacey	0	1	0	1	0	2	0	0	0	X	4

=== Final ===
Sunday, January 11, 11:00 am

Team	1	2	3	4	5	6	7	8	9	10	Final
Andrea Crawford	1	0	2	0	0	1	0	2	0	2	8
Sylvie Robichaud	0	2	0	0	1	0	2	0	2	0	7

2014 New Brunswick Scotties Tournament of Hearts

Andrea Crawford
7th New Brunswick Provincial Championship title
