= Andrea Kelly (curler) =

Canadian curler (born 1985)

- Curler
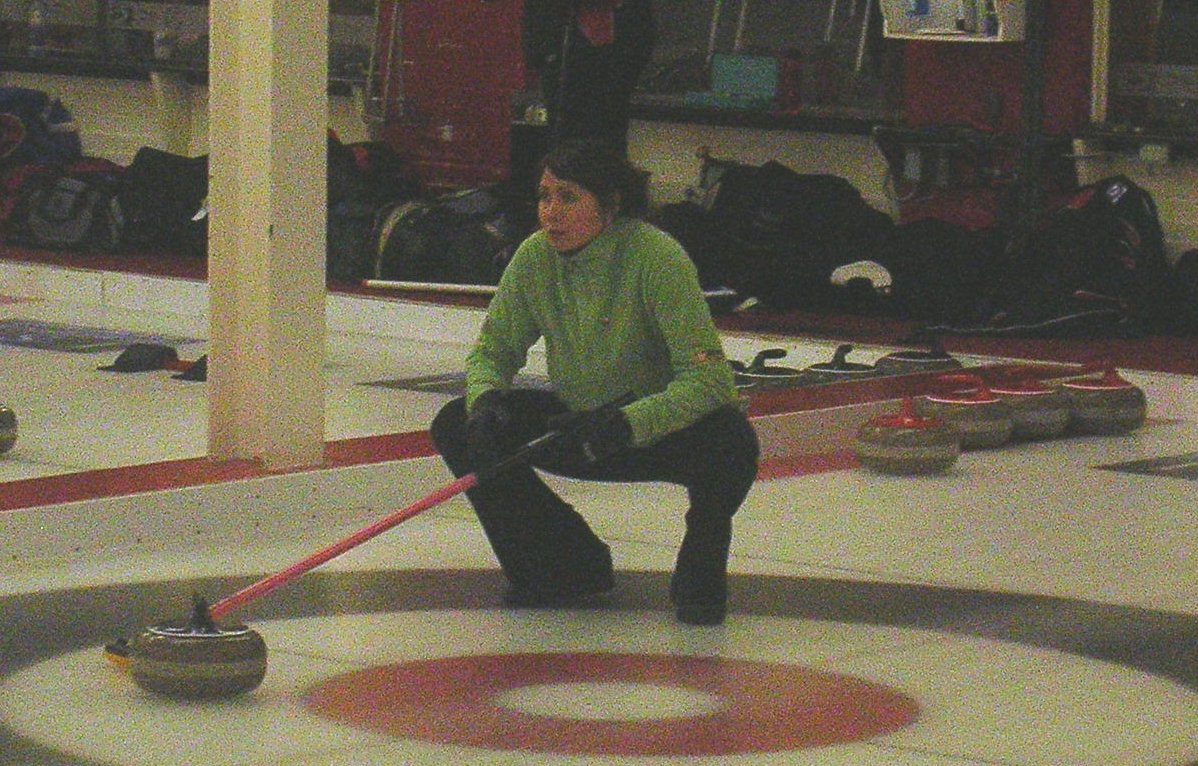
- Other names: Andrea Crawford
- Born: Andrea Kelly; July 31, 1985 (age 41); Perth-Andover, New Brunswick

Team
- Curling club: Gage G&CC, Oromocto, NB
- Skip: Andrea Kelly
- Third: Jennifer Armstrong
- Second: Erin Carmody
- Lead: Katie Vandenborre

Curling career
- Member Association: New Brunswick (2002–2014; 2018–2023; 2025–present); Alberta (2014); Germany (2016–17); Northern Ontario (2023–2025)
- Hearts: 13 (2006, 2009, 2010, 2011, 2012, 2013, 2014, 2019, 2020, 2022, 2023, 2024, 2025)
- Top CTRS ranking: 12th (2022–23)
Medal record
Women's curling
Representing Canada
World Junior Championships
Bronze medal – third place	2005 Pinerolo
Representing New Brunswick
Scotties Tournament of Hearts
Bronze medal – third place	2022 Thunder Bay
Canada Winter Games
Bronze medal – third place	2003 Bathurst

Andrea Kelly (born July 31, 1985), previously known as Andrea Crawford, is a Canadian curler from Fredericton, New Brunswick. She is a ten-time New Brunswick Scotties Tournament of Hearts champion skip, winning six straight titles from 2009–2014.

== Career ==
=== Juniors ===
Kelly's first national experience came at the 2002 Canadian Junior Curling Championships, where she would represent New Brunswick. Her team would finish round robin with a 6–6 record and a seventh-place finish.

Although Kelly would not win the New Brunswick junior championship in 2003, she would attend the 2003 Canada Winter Games, where she won a bronze medal.

Kelly would return to the Canadian Junior Curling Championships in 2004, where her team would improve on their previous record. They would finish round robin in third place with a 9–3 record. She would face Quebec's Marie Cantin in the semifinal, and after a close game would lose 6–5, and take home the bronze medal.

Kelly and her team would repeat as New Brunswick champions in 2005, and again at the 2005 Canadian Junior Curling Championships she would finish round robin third with a 9–3 record. Her team would again meet Quebec and Cantin in the semifinal, this time defeating them 7–5. They would face Alberta's Desirée Robertson in the final, where they would win the game and the gold medal with a 9–6 final. At the 2005 World Junior Curling Championships, Kelly skipped Team Canada to a bronze medal. In 2006, she was still eligible for Juniors, however she lost in her provincial championships.

=== Women's ===
==== 2006–2011: Transition to Women's Play ====
After losing the junior provincial, Kelly entered the 2006 New Brunswick Scott Tournament of Hearts, where her team would finish round robin with a first place 6–1 record, receiving a bye to the final. She would meet veteran Heidi Hanlon in the final, where the team would win 8–7 and the right to represent New Brunswick at the 2006 Scott Tournament of Hearts. At the Hearts, the team finished round robin with a 5–6 record.

At the 2009 New Brunswick Scotties Tournament of Hearts, Kelly and her team would finish round robin undefeated, with a 7–0 record. She would defeat Mary Jane McGuire in the final to win her second Scotties title. At the 2009 Scotties Tournament of Hearts the team would again finish round robin with a 5–6 record.

At the 2010 New Brunswick Scotties Tournament of Hearts, Kelly would again repeat with an undefeated, 7–0 record in round robin play. She would face Ashley Howard in the final, and was again victorious winning 8–5. At the 2010 Scotties Tournament of Hearts, Crawford, for a third straight appearance, would finish round robin with a 5-6 record.

Kelly qualified for the 2011 New Brunswick Scotties Tournament of Hearts, and for a third consecutive year, finished the round robin undefeated with a 7–0 record. She faced Sylvie Robichaud in the final, and with a clean sweep won 7–2. At the 2011 Scotties Tournament of Hearts, Kelly had her worst showing to date, finishing round robin play with a 3–8 record.

==== 2011–2014: New Team ====
Following the 2010–11 season, Kelly made significant team changes. She parted ways with longtime teammates, third Denise Nowlan and lead Lianne Sobey, bringing former second and alternate Jodie deSolla as her new lead, and in a new move added Rebecca Atkinson to skip the team. Although Atkinson became the new skip, Kelly continued to throw fourth stones. This combination worked for the squad, and the team finished in first place in the round robin, with a 6–1 record at the 2012 New Brunswick Scotties Tournament of Hearts. They defeated Mary Jane McGuire in the final, and for the fourth year in a row, Kelly represented New Brunswick at the 2012 Scotties Tournament of Hearts. The team struggled for the fourth time at a Scotties, and Kelly finished round robin play with a 5–6 record.

Kelly returned to skipping her team for the 2012–13 season and added Danielle Parsons to the second position. Her team again went undefeated at the 2013 New Brunswick Scotties Tournament of Hearts, where they won the event by defeating Melissa Adams 13–6 in the final. At the 2013 Scotties Tournament of Hearts, Kelly led her rink to the best finish of her career with a 6–5 record, which was still not good enough for the playoffs. At the 2014 New Brunswick Scotties Tournament of Hearts, Crawford lost one game en route to winning her seventh provincial title. At the 2014 Scotties Tournament of Hearts, she just missed the playoffs again, finishing 6–5.

==== 2014–2018: Alberta and Germany ====
In April 2014, it was announced that Kelly would be joining the Edmonton, Alberta-based Val Sweeting rink as her third. On October 28, Kelly left Team Sweeting to return to New Brunswick to deal with "personal issues". She was replaced by Lori Olson-Johns.

After leaving team Sweeting, Kelly did not curl competitively until the 2016–17 season, when she played for the Andrea Schöpp while living in Germany. That arrangement lasted just one season, with Kelly returning to New Brunswick.

==== 2018–2022: Return to New Brunswick ====
Kelly won her first New Brunswick Scotties upon her return in 2019, with teammates Jillian Babin, Jennifer Armstrong and Katie Forward. The team represented New Brunswick at the 2019 Scotties Tournament of Hearts, where they finished with a 3–4 record.

To start the 2019–20 season, Team Crawford won their first two events, the Steele Cup Cash and the Atlantic Superstore Monctonian Challenge. They played in a Grand Slam event, the 2019 Tour Challenge Tier 2. After a 2–2 round robin record, they lost the tiebreaker to Jestyn Murphy. The team defended their provincial title by winning the 2020 New Brunswick Scotties Tournament of Hearts in late January 2020. At the Hearts, the Crawford rink started with three losses before rallying off four wins in a row including scoring a seven ender against top-seeded Manitoba's Kerri Einarson rink to win 13–7 and defeating Team Canada (skipped by Chelsea Carey) 7–5. Their 4–3 round robin record qualified them for the tiebreaker against Saskatchewan's Robyn Silvernagle rink. Saskatchewan took two in the extra end for a 9–7 victory, eliminating New Brunswick from contention. The team announced on June 18, 2020 that they would be adding Sylvie Quillian to the team at third, replacing Jennifer Armstrong who was moving to Saskatchewan.

Due to the COVID-19 pandemic in New Brunswick, the 2021 provincial championship was cancelled. As the reigning provincial champions, Team Crawford was given the invitation to represent New Brunswick at the 2021 Scotties Tournament of Hearts, but they declined due to work and family commitments. Team Melissa Adams was then invited in their place, which they accepted.

Team Crawford played in five tour events during the 2021–22 season, performing well in all of them. In their first event, The Curling Store Cashspiel, the team reached the final where they lost to Nova Scotia's Christina Black upon giving up a stolen victory. They then lost in the final of the Steele Cup Cash two weeks later to the Mélodie Forsythe rink. They would then secure two victories in their next two events, going undefeated to claim the titles of the Dave Jones Stanhope Simpson Insurance Mayflower Cashspiel and the Atlantic Superstore Monctonian Challenge. The team then had a semifinal finish at the Stu Sells 1824 Halifax Classic, dropping the semifinal game to Switzerland's Corrie Hürlimann.

The 2022 New Brunswick Scotties Tournament of Hearts was cancelled due to the pandemic and Team Crawford were selected to represent their province at the 2022 Scotties Tournament of Hearts in Thunder Bay, Ontario. At the Hearts, the team began the event with five straight wins, the most consecutive wins to start a Tournament of Hearts of any New Brunswick team. Team Crawford finished the round robin with a 6–2 record, qualifying for the playoff round over higher seeded teams such as Wild Card #2 (Chelsea Carey), Wild Card #3 (Emma Miskew) and Saskatchewan's Penny Barker. They then defeated the Northwest Territories' Kerry Galusha in the knockout round and upset Team Canada's Kerri Einarson to reach the 1 vs. 2 page playoff game, becoming the first New Brunswick team to reach the playoffs since Heidi Hanlon in 1991. They then lost to Northern Ontario's Krista McCarville in the 1 vs. 2 game and Canada's Einarson rink in the semifinal, earning the bronze medal from the event. After the event, the team announced they would be parting ways with second Jillian Babin due to her relocation to Ontario. They then announced on March 4, 2022 that Jill Brothers would be joining them as their new second.

With the 2022 PointsBet Invitational being held in Fredericton, Team Kelly qualified as the host team. In the first round, they lost to Jennifer Jones 9–5 and were eliminated. On tour, the team qualified for the playoffs in all six events they played in, however, did not win any titles. They began with back-to-back quarterfinal appearances at the 2022 Stu Sells Toronto Tankard and the 2022 Tour Challenge Tier 2 Slam event. They then reached two consecutive semifinals at the Lady Monctonian and the 2022 Stu Sells 1824 Halifax Classic. In November, they went undefeated at the Jim Sullivan Curling Classic until the final where they lost to Suzanne Birt. They then reached the quarterfinals of the DeKalb Superspiel. In the new year, the team continued their dominance in New Brunswick, going undefeated through the prelim and provincial championship to win the 2023 New Brunswick Scotties Tournament of Hearts. In the final, they beat Abby Burgess 10–5. This qualified them for the 2023 Scotties Tournament of Hearts in Kamloops, British Columbia. After much success in 2022, the team finished seventh in their pool at the Hearts with a 3–5 record, only managing wins against Wild Card #2, Newfoundland and Labrador and the Yukon. After the Scotties, Kelly announced she would be leaving the team to join the Krista McCarville rink out of Northern Ontario as their new third.

==== 2023–2025: Team McCarville ====
Kelly's new team had immediate success together, winning the 2023 KW Fall Classic by defeating Scotland's Rebecca Morrison. They also had a quarterfinal finish at the North Grenville Women's Fall Curling Classic, losing out to Hailey Armstrong. In the new year, the team easily won the 2024 Northern Ontario Scotties Tournament of Hearts, going undefeated to claim the title. At the 2024 Scotties Tournament of Hearts in Calgary, the team had mixed results. Sitting 4–3 heading into their last round robin game, they lost to Manitoba's Kaitlyn Lawes 6–5. This created a five-way tie for third with Lawes, British Columbia, Quebec, and Saskatchewan. With tiebreaker games abolished and the first tiebreaker (which was head-to-head between all tied teams) tied as well at 2–2, cumulative last stone draw distance between all the teams was used to decide who would make the playoffs. The McCarville rink finished with a total of 370.3 but would miss the playoffs as the Lawes rink finished first with a 231.6.

Team McCarville reached the final in their first event of the 2024–25 season, losing to Japan's Miyu Ueno at the Mother Club Fall Curling Classic. They next played in the 2024 Stu Sells Toronto Tankard where they were taken out by eventual champion Kim Eun-jung in the quarterfinals. In November 2024, they won the Stu Sells Living Waters Collingwood Classic, going undefeated to claim the title. At the 2025 Northern Ontario Women's Curling Championship, the team finished the round robin in a three-way tie for first place. After beating Robyn Despins in the semifinal, the McCarville rink scored one in the tenth end of the final to defeat Emma Artichuk 6–5. This qualified them for the 2025 Scotties Tournament of Hearts in Thunder Bay, where the team curls out of. There, the team had a disappointing start, losing their first four games. They then won their last four games, however, it was not enough to qualify for the playoffs. A week after the event, Kelly parted ways with the team.

==== 2025–Present ====
Kelly would return to New Brunswick and skip a new team for the 2025–26 curling season, alongside Jennifer Fenwick, Erin Carmody and Katie Vandenborre. They would start the season off finishing second at the 2025 Steele Cup Cash tour event, and winning the Dave Jones Stanhope Simpson Insurance Mayflower Cashspiel.

=== Mixed doubles ===
Kelly was recruited by Tyler Tardi to play at the 2024 Canadian Mixed Doubles Curling Championship after his regular partner, Rachel Homan couldn't play due to representing Canada at the 2024 World Women's Curling Championship. There, the twosome finished pool play with a 5–2 record. In the playoffs, the team lost in the qualification game against the husband-wife duo of Aaron and Amanda Sluchinski of Alberta.

== Personal life ==
Kelly works as a senior employment and labour relations officer for the Canadian Forces Morale and Welfare Services. She is engaged and has one daughter.

== Grand Slam record ==
Key
C	Champion
F	Lost in Final
SF	Lost in Semifinal
QF	Lost in Quarterfinals
R16	Lost in the round of 16
Q	Did not advance to playoffs
T2	Played in Tier 2 event
DNP	Did not participate in event
N/A	Not a Grand Slam event that season

Event	2019–20	2020–21	2021–22	2022–23
Tour Challenge	T2	N/A	N/A	T2

=== Former events ===
Event	2006–07	2007–08	2008–09	2009–10	2010–11	2011–12	2012–13	2013–14	2014–15
Autumn Gold	Q	Q	DNP	Q	Q	DNP	Q	DNP	Q
Manitoba Lotteries	DNP	DNP	DNP	DNP	DNP	DNP	DNP	Q	N/A
Sobeys Slam	N/A	SF	Q	N/A	Q	N/A	N/A	N/A	N/A
