= 2013 New Brunswick Scotties Tournament of Hearts =

- Host city: Fredericton Junction, New Brunswick
- Arena: Tri-County Complex
- Dates: January 30 – February 3
- Winner: Andrea Crawford
- Curling club: Gage Golf and Curling Club, Oromocto
- Skip: Andrea Crawford
- Third: Rebecca Atkinson
- Second: Danielle Parsons
- Lead: Jodie deSolla
- Coach: Charlie Sullivan
- Finalist: Melissa Adams

The 2013 New Brunswick Scotties Tournament of Hearts, the women's provincial curling championship for New Brunswick, was held from January 30 to February 3 at the Tri-County Complex in Fredericton Junction, New Brunswick. The winning team of Andrea Crawford represented New Brunswick at the 2013 Scotties Tournament of Hearts in Kingston, Ontario.

== Teams ==
Skip	Third	Second	Lead	Alternate	Club
Melissa Adams	Jaclyn Crandall	Brigitte McClure	Bethany Toner	Monique Masse	Grand Falls Sporting Club Inc., Grand Falls
Sandy Comeau	Carol Whitaker	Stacey Leger	Jane Boyle		Curl Moncton, Moncton
Andrea Crawford	Rebecca Atkinson	Danielle Parsons	Jodie deSolla		Gage Golf and Curling Club, Oromocto
Sharon Levesque	Kathy Lyman	Debbie Dickeson	Michelle Majeau		Capital Winter Club, Fredericton
Stacey McCormack Lacey	Sarah Bethelot	Leah Thompson	Micheala Downey	Kim Dow	Thistle St. Andrews Curling Club, Saint John
Mary Jane McGuire	Megan McGuire	Abby Burgess	Alice MacKay	Emily MaCrae	Capital Winter Club, Fredericton
Sylvie Robichaud	Danielle Amos	Marie Richard	Kendra Lister	Denise Nowlan	Curl Moncton, Moncton
Jessica Ronalds	Shannon Tatlock	Sarah Ronalds	Stephanie Taylor		Curl Moncton, Moncton

== Round Robin standings ==
Final Round Robin standings

Key
Teams to Playoffs

Skip (Club)	W	L	PF	PA	Ends Won	Ends Lost	Blank Ends	Stolen Ends
Andrea Crawford (Gage)	7	0	68	18	29	14	6	14
Sylvie Robichaud (Moncton)	5	2	52	41	31	25	9	7
Melissa Adams (Grand Falls)	5	2	46	42	28	25	10	9
Sandy Comeau (Moncton)	3	4	47	44	29	27	8	9
Mary Jane McGuire (Capital Winter Club)	3	4	41	37	25	25	11	6
Stacey McCormack Lacey (Thistle St. Andrews)	2	5	41	53	25	34	6	3
Jessica Ronalds (Moncton)	2	5	29	55	22	30	9	5
Sharon Levesque (Capital Winter Club)	1	6	37	64	25	32	1	6

== Round Robin results ==
All draw times are listed in Atlantic Standard Time (UTC−4).

=== Draw 1 ===
Wednesday, January 30, 9:00 am

Sheet 1	1	2	3	4	5	6	7	8	9	10	Final
Stacey McCormack Lacey	0	1	0	1	0	2	2	0	2	X	8
Jessica Ronalds	1	0	0	0	1	0	0	1	0	X	3

Sheet 2	1	2	3	4	5	6	7	8	9	10	Final
Sharon Levesque	0	0	1	0	1	2	0	X	X	X	4
Mary Jane McGuire	4	3	0	3	0	0	2	X	X	X	12

Sheet 3	1	2	3	4	5	6	7	8	9	10	Final
Melissa Adams	0	0	0	1	0	0	0	X	X	X	1
Andrea Crawford	0	2	1	0	5	0	1	X	X	X	9

Sheet 4	1	2	3	4	5	6	7	8	9	10	11	Final
Sandy Comeau	0	0	3	0	0	1	0	0	0	2	0	6
Sylvie Robichaud	2	0	0	0	1	0	2	0	1	0	1	7

=== Draw 2 ===
Wednesday, January 30, 4:00 pm

Sheet 1	1	2	3	4	5	6	7	8	9	10	Final
Andrea Crawford	2	0	0	1	3	0	2	0	3	X	11
Sandy Comeau	0	1	0	0	0	2	0	1	0	X	4

Sheet 2	1	2	3	4	5	6	7	8	9	10	Final
Sylvie Robichaud	0	0	0	1	0	1	0	1	0	X	3
Melissa Adams	1	0	0	0	2	0	2	0	2	X	7

Sheet 3	1	2	3	4	5	6	7	8	9	10	Final
Jessica Ronalds	1	1	0	1	0	1	0	2	0	1	7
Sharon Levesque	0	0	1	0	1	0	2	0	1	0	5

Sheet 4	1	2	3	4	5	6	7	8	9	10	Final
Mary Jane McGuire	0	0	0	0	2	1	0	1	0	0	4
Stacey McCormack Lacey	0	0	2	0	0	0	1	0	0	2	5

=== Draw 3 ===
Thursday, January 31, 9:00 am

Sheet 1	1	2	3	4	5	6	7	8	9	10	Final
Melissa Adams	0	1	0	0	0	1	0	1	0	X	3
Mary Jane McGuire	1	0	3	0	1	0	1	0	1	X	7

Sheet 2	1	2	3	4	5	6	7	8	9	10	Final
Sandy Comeau	1	2	0	1	0	1	0	0	0	0	5
Jessica Ronalds	0	0	1	0	3	0	0	0	1	1	6

Sheet 3	1	2	3	4	5	6	7	8	9	10	11	Final
Stacey McCormack Lacey	3	0	1	0	2	0	2	0	1	0	0	9
Sylvie Robichaud	0	1	0	3	0	1	0	1	0	3	1	10

Sheet 4	1	2	3	4	5	6	7	8	9	10	Final
Sharon Levesque	0	0	3	0	X	X	X	X	X	X	3
Andrea Crawford	3	5	0	3	X	X	X	X	X	X	11

=== Draw 4 ===
Thursday, January 31, 4:00 pm

Sheet 1	1	2	3	4	5	6	7	8	9	10	Final
Sylvie Robichaud	3	3	0	2	3	0	1	0	X	X	12
Sharon Levesque	0	0	2	0	0	2	0	1	X	X	5

Sheet 2	1	2	3	4	5	6	7	8	9	10	Final
Andrea Crawford	0	3	1	2	1	4	X	X	X	X	11
Stacey McCormack Lacey	1	0	0	0	0	0	X	X	X	X	1

Sheet 3	1	2	3	4	5	6	7	8	9	10	Final
Sandy Comeau	0	0	2	0	2	1	1	3	X	X	9
Mary Jane McGuire	1	0	0	3	0	0	0	0	X	X	4

Sheet 4	1	2	3	4	5	6	7	8	9	10	Final
Melissa Adams	0	0	2	0	2	0	0	2	1	3	10
Jessica Ronalds	3	1	0	0	0	0	3	0	0	0	7

=== Draw 5 ===
Friday, February 1, 8:00 am

Sheet 1	1	2	3	4	5	6	7	8	9	10	Final
Stacey McCormack Lacey	0	1	0	0	1	0	0	1	0	X	3
Melissa Adams	0	0	1	1	0	3	1	0	1	X	7

Sheet 2	1	2	3	4	5	6	7	8	9	10	Final
Mary Jane McGuire	0	1	0	0	1	0	0	1	1	X	4
Sylvie Robichaud	3	0	1	0	0	1	2	0	0	X	7

Sheet 3	1	2	3	4	5	6	7	8	9	10	Final
Jessica Ronalds	0	1	0	0	0	X	X	X	X	X	1
Andrea Crawford	4	0	1	2	5	X	X	X	X	X	12

Sheet 4	1	2	3	4	5	6	7	8	9	10	Final
Sharon Levesque	1	0	2	0	0	1	1	0	0	X	5
Sandy Comeau	0	2	0	2	1	0	0	1	1	X	7

=== Draw 6 ===
Friday, February 1, 3:00 pm

Sheet 1	1	2	3	4	5	6	7	8	9	10	Final
Jessica Ronalds	0	1	0	0	0	0	1	0	X	X	2
Sylvie Robichaud	1	0	0	2	0	3	0	2	X	X	8

Sheet 2	1	2	3	4	5	6	7	8	9	10	Final
Melissa Adams	0	2	1	0	0	2	0	0	2	2	9
Sharon Levesque	2	0	0	2	2	0	0	1	0	0	7

Sheet 3	1	2	3	4	5	6	7	8	9	10	Final
Stacey McCormack Lacey	3	0	2	0	2	2	0	0	0	0	9
Sandy Comeau	0	2	0	1	0	0	2	1	1	3	10

Sheet 4	1	2	3	4	5	6	7	8	9	10	Final
Andrea Crawford	0	0	1	3	0	0	1	1	0	X	6
Mary Jane McGuire	0	1	0	0	1	0	0	0	1	X	3

=== Draw 7 ===
Saturday, February 2, 8:00 am

Sheet 1	1	2	3	4	5	6	7	8	9	10	Final
Sharon Levesque	1	1	2	0	1	0	0	2	0	1	8
Stacey McCormack Lacey	0	0	0	1	0	2	1	0	2	0	6

Sheet 2	1	2	3	4	5	6	7	8	9	10	Final
Sylvie Robichaud	0	1	0	2	0	1	0	0	1	X	5
Andrea Crawford	0	0	2	0	4	0	1	1	0	X	8

Sheet 3	1	2	3	4	5	6	7	8	9	10	Final
Mary Jane McGuire	1	0	0	2	0	0	0	2	2	X	7
Jessica Ronalds	0	0	1	0	1	0	1	0	0	X	3

Sheet 4	1	2	3	4	5	6	7	8	9	10	Final
Sandy Comeau	0	1	0	4	0	0	0	0	1	X	6
Melissa Adams	3	0	1	0	2	0	2	1	0	X	9

== Playoffs ==
Semifinal			Final
			1	Andrea Crawford	13
2	Melissa Adams	8	2	Melissa Adams	6
3	Sylvie Robichaud	7

=== Semifinal ===
Sunday, February 3, 9:00 am

Sheet 2	1	2	3	4	5	6	7	8	9	10	Final
Melissa Adams	2	1	0	1	0	2	0	1	0	1	8
Sylvie Robichaud	0	0	2	0	2	0	1	0	2	0	7

=== Final ===
Sunday, February 3, 11:00 am

Sheet 3	1	2	3	4	5	6	7	8	9	10	Final
Andrea Crawford	2	3	0	1	0	3	0	0	4	X	13
Melissa Adams	0	0	2	0	1	0	1	2	0	X	6

2013 New Brunswick Scotties Tournament of Hearts

Andrea Crawford
6th New Brunswick Provincial Championship title

== Qualification round ==
The qualification round for the 2013 New Brunswick Tournament of Hearts took place from January 4 to 6. The format of play was an open-entry double knockout, qualifying eight teams to the provincial playoffs.
