= Rebecca Atkinson (curler) =

Canadian curler from New Brunswick

- Curler
- Born: July 17, 1982 (age 44); Halifax, Nova Scotia

Curling career
- Member Association: New Brunswick
- Hearts: 5 (2012, 2013, 2014, 2015, 2016)
- Top CTRS ranking: 19th (2005–06)

Rebecca "Becky" Atkinson (born July 17, 1982) is a Canadian lawyer and curler from Rothesay, New Brunswick.

== Career ==
=== Juniors ===
Her first appearance at the Canadian Junior Curling Championships was in 2000 in Moncton, New Brunswick. She was selected from the spare pool for Teams New Brunswick and Newfoundland and Labrador throughout the week. Her second and final trip to the championships was in 2003, this time as skip of her own team. She finished the round robin in seventh place, with a 6–6 record.

=== Women's ===
Atkinson participated at the 2009 New Brunswick Scotties Tournament of Hearts, where she skipped her own squad. She would not make the playoffs that year, finishing sixth place with a 3–4 record, but would return again to the 2011 New Brunswick Scotties Tournament of Hearts, where she would finish round robin in first place with a 5–2 record. She would then face Sylvie Robichaud in the semifinal, losing the game 6–4.

For the 2011–12 season, Atkinson left her team and joined with Andrea Kelly (Crawford) to form a new squad. Atkinson threw third stones and skipped the team. The team participated in the first Curl Atlantic Championship, where they would advance to the playoffs. They faced Suzanne Birt in the semifinal, but ended up losing by a score of 6–2. The team went on to participate in the 2012 New Brunswick Scotties Tournament of Hearts. There, they finished the round robin in first place with a 6–1 record. They received a bye to the final, where they faced Mary Jane McGuire, and won the championship by a score of 7–5. With the win, Atkinson also won the right to represent New Brunswick at the 2012 Scotties Tournament of Hearts. In Atkinson's first Scotties appearance, she skipped her team to a sixth place round robin finish, ending with a 5–6 record.

Atkinson, who had skipped the team during the 2011–12 season, switched positions with Crawford after the season. Crawford would skip the team, with Atkinson throwing third rocks. The team went undefeated at the 2013 New Brunswick Scotties Tournament of Hearts, defeating Melissa Adams in the final, earning the team the right to represent New Brunswick at the 2013 Scotties Tournament of Hearts. There, the team finished with a 6–5 record, tied for fifth. The following year, the team lost just one match en route to winning the 2014 New Brunswick Scotties Tournament of Hearts, defeating the Sylvie Robichaud in the final. At the 2014 Scotties Tournament of Hearts, the rink once again finished with a 6–5 record, tied for fifth place.

After the 2013–14 season, Crawford moved to Alberta and Atkinson joined the Sylvie Robichaud team with Marie Richard at second and Jane Boyle at lead. She would win her fourth provincial title in a row at the 2015 New Brunswick Scotties Tournament of Hearts where her new rink defeated Melissa Adams 7–6 in the provincial final. At the 2015 Scotties Tournament of Hearts in Moose Jaw, Saskatchewan, New Brunswick defeated higher seeds such as Ontario's Julie Hastings and Team Canada's Rachel Homan, ultimately finishing the round robin with a 4–7 record. The team was able to defend their title at the 2016 New Brunswick Scotties Tournament of Hearts, sending Atkinson to her fifth Canadian championship in Grand Prairie, Alberta. At the end of the round robin, New Brunswick was placed last with a 2–9 record, meaning they would be relegated to the pre-qualification event the following year. Also during the 2015–16 season, her team played in the 2015 GSOC Tour Challenge Tier 2 Grand Slam of Curling event, where they lost in the quarterfinals to Jamie Sinclair.

== Personal life ==
Atkinson was born in Halifax, Nova Scotia. She is a lawyer with Cox & Palmer.
