= 2013 Scotties Tournament of Hearts =

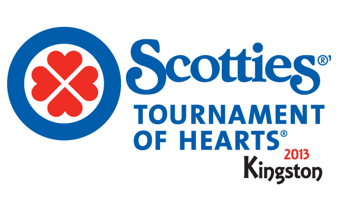
- Host city: Kingston, Ontario
- Arena: K-Rock Centre
- Dates: February 16–24
- Attendance: 65,825
- Winner: Ontario
- Curling club: Ottawa Curling Club, Ottawa
- Skip: Rachel Homan
- Third: Emma Miskew
- Second: Alison Kreviazuk
- Lead: Lisa Weagle
- Alternate: Stephanie LeDrew
- Coach: Earle Morris
- Finalist: Manitoba (Jennifer Jones)

The 2013 Scotties Tournament of Hearts, the Canadian women's national curling championship, was held from February 16 to 24 at the K-Rock Centre in Kingston, Ontario. It was the ninth time Ontario hosted the Tournament of Hearts. Ontario last hosted the Scotties in 2010 in Sault Ste. Marie.

In the final, Rachel Homan of Ontario defeated former Scotties champion Jennifer Jones with a score of 9–6 to claim her first Scotties title. Homan and her team went on to represent Canada at the 2013 World Women's Curling Championship in Riga, Latvia.

== Event summary ==
In the fifty-third edition of the Canadian Women's Curling Championship, there was a mix of veterans and newer faces in the team rosters. The defending champion Heather Nedohin rink represented Team Canada, while 2007 world champion Kelly Scott and her rink from British Columbia and 2008 world champion Jennifer Jones and her team from Manitoba also made appearances. Two-time world champion Mary-Anne Arsenault and her team from Nova Scotia (including six-time Hearts champion Colleen Jones throwing second stones) made a notable appearance. 2005 Canadian Junior champion Andrea Crawford skipped her team from New Brunswick, and 11-time Territories champion Kerry Galusha skipped the Northwest Territories/Yukon team. Other teams included 2010 Olympic silver medallist Kristie Moore and her rink from Alberta, 2007 Canadian Junior Champion Stacie Devereaux from Newfoundland and Labrador, 2010 Canadian Junior Champion Rachel Homan and her rink from Ontario, 2001 World Junior Champion Suzanne Birt of Prince Edward Island and 1999 Ontario & 2005 Quebec champion Allison Ross representing Quebec. Only one skip made her Hearts debut, Jill Shumay of Saskatchewan.

Team Manitoba, skipped by Jennifer Jones, became the first team to go undefeated in round robin play since Linda Moore of British Columbia did so in 1985. Jones, who made her ninth consecutive Scotties appearance, also secured her ninth consecutive spot in the playoffs. She played Team Ontario, skipped by Rachel Homan, in the page 1 vs. 2 playoff game, but lost her first game in the tournament as Homan and her team defeated her with a score of 8–5. Team British Columbia, skipped by Kelly Scott, played Team Canada, skipped by Heather Nedohin, in the page 3 vs. 4 playoff game, but lost as Team Canada's strong play gave them an 8–4 win in 9 ends. Team Canada attempted to reach their second straight final, playing in the semifinal against Manitoba. Jones made up for her poor play in the page playoffs, securing an 8–5 win for a spot in the final. Team Canada was relegated to the bronze medal game, where Team Canada and Team British Columbia battled back and forth before a missed double takeout in the final end by Nedohin gave British Columbia the win, by a score of 10–8. Manitoba and Ontario faced off for the championship in the final. Manitoba found themselves in a three-point hole when Jones missed a crucial draw, but regained some momentum with a stolen point in the fourth end and a deuce in the sixth end to tie up the game. In the seventh end, a successful double takeout by Homan led to another three-point end for Ontario, and a missed triple takeout by Jones led to a steal of two points for Ontario. The game ended after Ontario ran Manitoba out of stones in the tenth end, giving Ontario its first Scotties title in sixteen years. The Homan rink also became the first ever Ottawa-based team to win either the Scotties or the Brier.

== Teams ==
The teams are listed as follows:

Canada	Alberta	British Columbia
Saville SC, Edmonton Skip: Heather Nedohin; Third: Beth Iskiw; Second: Jessica Mair; Lead: Laine Peters; Alternate: Cori Morris	Grande Prairie CC, Grande Prairie Skip: Kristie Moore; Third: Blaine de Jager; Second: Michelle Dykstra; Lead: Amber Cheveldave; Alternate: Renée Sonnenberg	Kelowna CC, Kelowna Skip: Kelly Scott; Third: Jeanna Schraeder; Second: Sasha Carter; Lead: Sarah Wazney; Alternate: Diane Gushulak
Manitoba	New Brunswick	Newfoundland and Labrador
St. Vital CC, Winnipeg Skip: Jennifer Jones; Third: Kaitlyn Lawes; Second: Jill Officer; Lead: Dawn Askin; Alternate: Kristin MacCuish	Gage G&CC, Oromocto Skip: Andrea Crawford; Third: Rebecca Atkinson; Second: Danielle Parsons; Lead: Jodie deSolla; Alternate: Jane Boyle	Bally Haly G&CC, St. John's Skip: Stacie Devereaux; Third: Erin Porter; Second: Lauren Wasylkiw; Lead: Heather Martin; Alternate: Julie Devereaux
Nova Scotia	Ontario	Prince Edward Island
Mayflower CC, Halifax Skip: Mary-Anne Arsenault; Third: Kim Kelly; Second: Colleen Jones; Lead: Jenn Baxter; Alternate: Nancy Delahunt	Ottawa CC, Ottawa Skip: Rachel Homan; Third: Emma Miskew; Second: Alison Kreviazuk; Lead: Lisa Weagle; Alternate: Stephanie LeDrew	Charlottetown CC, Charlottetown Skip: Suzanne Birt; Third: Shelly Bradley; Second: Sarah Fullerton; Lead: Leslie MacDougall; Alternate: Stefanie Clark
Quebec	Saskatchewan	Northwest Territories/Yukon
Glenmore CC, Dollard-des-Ormeaux Skip: Allison Ross; Third: Audrée Dufresne; Second: Brittany O'Rourke; Lead: Sasha Beauchamp; Alternate: Annie Lemay	Maidstone CC, Maidstone Skip: Jill Shumay; Third: Kara Johnston; Second: Taryn Holtby; Lead: Jinaye Ayrey; Alternate: Patty Hersikorn	Yellowknife CC, Yellowknife Skip: Kerry Galusha; Third: Sharon Cormier; Second: Megan Cormier; Lead: Wendy Miller; Alternate: Shona Barbour

== Map of teams ==
Team Canada Provincial Winners

== Round robin standings ==
Final Round Robin Standings

Locale	Skip	W	L	PF	PA	EW	EL	BE	SE	S%
Manitoba	Jennifer Jones	11	0	95	45	53	35	9	20	85%
Ontario	Rachel Homan	10	1	87	48	50	33	16	14	82%
British Columbia	Kelly Scott	8	3	89	69	53	47	3	10	79%
Canada	Heather Nedohin	7	4	79	61	46	46	11	9	81%
Saskatchewan	Jill Shumay	6	5	71	74	45	44	7	14	73%
New Brunswick	Andrea Crawford	6	5	82	82	46	49	8	11	76%
Nova Scotia	Mary-Anne Arsenault	5	6	68	76	52	44	9	18	79%
Prince Edward Island	Suzanne Birt	5	6	79	83	48	47	6	11	73%
Quebec	Allison Ross	3	8	60	89	43	46	13	11	75%
Northwest Territories/Yukon	Kerry Galusha	2	9	58	92	40	54	9	10	67%
Newfoundland and Labrador	Stacie Devereaux	2	9	59	87	37	58	6	8	68%
Alberta	Kristie Moore	1	10	53	80	37	49	13	4	70%

== Round robin results ==
All draw times listed in Eastern Time Zone (UTC-5).

=== Draw 1 ===
Saturday, February 16, 2:00 pm

Sheet A	1	2	3	4	5	6	7	8	9	10	Final
Saskatchewan (Shumay) 🔨	0	2	0	0	1	1	3	0	X	X	7
Northwest Territories/Yukon (Galusha)	0	0	1	0	0	0	0	1	X	X	2

Sheet B	1	2	3	4	5	6	7	8	9	10	Final
Newfoundland and Labrador (Devereaux) 🔨	0	0	1	0	0	0	0	0	X	X	1
Ontario (Homan)	2	1	0	1	1	0	2	1	X	X	8

Sheet C	1	2	3	4	5	6	7	8	9	10	Final
Manitoba (Jones)	0	1	0	1	2	0	2	0	2	X	8
Prince Edward Island (Birt) 🔨	1	0	3	0	0	1	0	1	0	X	6

Sheet D	1	2	3	4	5	6	7	8	9	10	Final
Canada (Nedohin) 🔨	0	2	0	1	0	2	0	2	0	2	9
New Brunswick (Crawford)	0	0	3	0	1	0	1	0	1	0	6

=== Draw 2 ===
Saturday, February 16, 7:00 pm

Sheet A	1	2	3	4	5	6	7	8	9	10	Final
Prince Edward Island (Birt)	0	0	1	0	2	0	2	0	X	X	5
New Brunswick (Crawford) 🔨	2	2	0	2	0	3	0	2	X	X	11

Sheet B	1	2	3	4	5	6	7	8	9	10	Final
Alberta (Moore)	1	0	1	0	0	2	0	1	0	1	6
British Columbia (Scott) 🔨	0	2	0	1	2	0	1	0	1	0	7

Sheet C	1	2	3	4	5	6	7	8	9	10	11	Final
Northwest Territories/Yukon (Galusha)	1	1	0	0	1	0	2	0	0	2	1	8
Newfoundland and Labrador (Devereaux) 🔨	0	0	0	2	0	1	0	3	1	0	0	7

Sheet D	1	2	3	4	5	6	7	8	9	10	Final
Nova Scotia (Arsenault)	0	0	0	0	3	0	0	0	1	0	4
Quebec (Ross) 🔨	0	1	1	1	0	0	0	1	0	5	9

=== Draw 3 ===
Sunday, February 17, 9:00 am

Sheet A	1	2	3	4	5	6	7	8	9	10	Final
Ontario (Homan)	0	0	3	0	3	0	2	0	1	X	9
Alberta (Moore) 🔨	0	1	0	2	0	1	0	1	0	X	5

Sheet B	1	2	3	4	5	6	7	8	9	10	Final
Quebec (Ross) 🔨	0	1	0	0	1	0	3	0	X	X	5
Saskatchewan (Shumay)	0	0	1	3	0	6	0	2	X	X	12

Sheet C	1	2	3	4	5	6	7	8	9	10	Final
Canada (Nedohin)	0	2	0	3	0	1	0	0	0	1	7
Nova Scotia (Arsenault) 🔨	2	0	1	0	1	0	0	1	1	0	6

Sheet D	1	2	3	4	5	6	7	8	9	10	Final
Manitoba (Jones) 🔨	1	0	2	0	3	0	2	0	2	X	10
British Columbia (Scott)	0	1	0	1	0	1	0	1	0	X	4

=== Draw 4 ===
Sunday, February 17, 2:00 pm

Sheet A	1	2	3	4	5	6	7	8	9	10	Final
Newfoundland and Labrador (Devereaux)	0	0	0	0	0	0	1	X	X	X	1
Manitoba (Jones) 🔨	0	2	2	3	1	1	0	X	X	X	9

Sheet B	1	2	3	4	5	6	7	8	9	10	Final
Prince Edward Island (Birt)	0	1	0	1	1	0	0	1	0	1	5
Canada (Nedohin) 🔨	2	0	1	0	0	1	0	0	2	0	6

Sheet C	1	2	3	4	5	6	7	8	9	10	Final
Saskatchewan (Shumay)	0	1	0	4	0	1	0	3	1	X	10
New Brunswick (Crawford) 🔨	2	0	1	0	1	0	1	0	0	X	5

Sheet D	1	2	3	4	5	6	7	8	9	10	Final
Ontario (Homan) 🔨	2	2	1	0	1	0	0	3	X	X	9
Northwest Territories/Yukon (Galusha)	0	0	0	1	0	0	1	0	X	X	2

=== Draw 5 ===
Sunday, February 17, 7:00 pm

Sheet A	1	2	3	4	5	6	7	8	9	10	Final
Nova Scotia (Arsenault)	0	1	0	1	0	0	1	1	0	X	4
British Columbia (Scott) 🔨	3	0	1	0	2	1	0	0	2	X	9

Sheet B	1	2	3	4	5	6	7	8	9	10	Final
New Brunswick (Crawford)	2	1	0	0	3	0	0	3	0	X	9
Northwest Territories/Yukon (Galusha) 🔨	0	0	2	0	0	1	1	0	1	X	5

Sheet C	1	2	3	4	5	6	7	8	9	10	Final
Quebec (Ross) 🔨	2	1	0	1	0	3	1	0	0	1	9
Alberta (Moore)	0	0	1	0	3	0	0	1	1	0	6

Sheet D	1	2	3	4	5	6	7	8	9	10	Final
Prince Edward Island (Birt)	0	0	3	0	3	2	0	2	2	X	12
Newfoundland and Labrador (Devereaux) 🔨	3	1	0	1	0	0	2	0	0	X	7

=== Draw 6 ===
Monday, February 18, 2:00 pm

Sheet A	1	2	3	4	5	6	7	8	9	10	Final
Quebec (Ross)	0	0	1	0	0	1	0	X	X	X	2
Canada (Nedohin) 🔨	3	2	0	1	3	0	3	X	X	X	12

Sheet B	1	2	3	4	5	6	7	8	9	10	Final
Manitoba (Jones)	0	1	0	0	3	0	4	3	X	X	11
Nova Scotia (Arsenault) 🔨	1	0	1	1	0	1	0	0	X	X	4

Sheet C	1	2	3	4	5	6	7	8	9	10	11	Final
Ontario (Homan)	0	1	2	0	2	0	0	2	1	0	1	9
British Columbia (Scott) 🔨	1	0	0	3	0	2	1	0	0	1	0	8

Sheet D	1	2	3	4	5	6	7	8	9	10	Final
Alberta (Moore)	1	0	2	2	0	0	0	0	1	0	6
Saskatchewan (Shumay) 🔨	0	1	0	0	1	0	2	2	0	1	7

=== Draw 7 ===
Monday, February 18, 7:30 pm

Sheet A	1	2	3	4	5	6	7	8	9	10	Final
New Brunswick (Crawford)	0	0	2	0	2	0	0	0	1	0	5
Ontario (Homan) 🔨	0	2	0	1	0	0	0	2	0	2	7

Sheet B	1	2	3	4	5	6	7	8	9	10	Final
Canada (Nedohin) 🔨	3	0	3	2	0	1	1	X	X	X	10
Newfoundland and Labrador (Devereaux)	0	1	0	0	2	0	0	X	X	X	3

Sheet C	1	2	3	4	5	6	7	8	9	10	Final
Prince Edward Island (Birt) 🔨	2	0	2	0	2	0	3	0	3	X	12
Saskatchewan (Shumay)	0	1	0	3	0	2	0	1	0	X	7

Sheet D	1	2	3	4	5	6	7	8	9	10	Final
Northwest Territories/Yukon (Galusha)	0	0	1	0	0	0	0	0	X	X	1
Manitoba (Jones) 🔨	1	0	0	1	1	2	1	3	X	X	9

=== Draw 8 ===
Tuesday, February 19, 2:00 pm

Sheet A	1	2	3	4	5	6	7	8	9	10	Final
Alberta (Moore) 🔨	0	0	1	0	1	0	0	1	X	X	3
Newfoundland and Labrador (Devereaux)	0	1	0	4	0	0	3	0	X	X	8

Sheet B	1	2	3	4	5	6	7	8	9	10	Final
British Columbia (Scott) 🔨	2	2	0	1	1	0	1	0	6	X	13
New Brunswick (Crawford)	0	0	2	0	0	3	0	2	0	X	7

Sheet C	1	2	3	4	5	6	7	8	9	10	Final
Nova Scotia (Arsenault)	0	3	1	0	1	0	2	0	2	1	10
Northwest Territories/Yukon (Galusha) 🔨	1	0	0	1	0	3	0	2	0	0	7

Sheet D	1	2	3	4	5	6	7	8	9	10	11	Final
Quebec (Ross) 🔨	0	1	2	0	0	0	1	0	2	0	0	6
Prince Edward Island (Birt)	1	0	0	0	1	1	0	1	0	2	2	8

=== Draw 9 ===
Tuesday, February 19, 7:00 pm

Sheet A	1	2	3	4	5	6	7	8	9	10	Final
Saskatchewan (Shumay) 🔨	1	0	0	0	1	1	0	2	0	X	5
Nova Scotia (Arsenault)	0	3	1	1	0	0	1	0	1	X	7

Sheet B	1	2	3	4	5	6	7	8	9	10	Final
Ontario (Homan) 🔨	0	1	3	0	0	2	0	1	1	X	8
Quebec (Ross)	0	0	0	2	0	0	2	0	0	X	4

Sheet C	1	2	3	4	5	6	7	8	9	10	Final
Alberta (Sonnenberg)*	0	1	0	1	0	0	2	0	2	0	6
Manitoba (Jones) 🔨	2	0	3	0	2	0	0	1	0	1	9

Sheet D	1	2	3	4	5	6	7	8	9	10	Final
British Columbia (Scott) 🔨	1	0	0	0	1	0	1	0	2	0	5
Canada (Nedohin)	0	1	1	0	0	2	0	2	0	1	7

*Sonnenberg spared for Moore in skipping Alberta for this game.

=== Draw 10 ===
Wednesday, February 20, 2:00 pm

Sheet A	1	2	3	4	5	6	7	8	9	10	Final
Canada (Nedohin) 🔨	1	0	0	0	0	2	0	0	2	0	5
Manitoba (Jones)	0	0	0	2	1	0	2	1	0	2	8

Sheet B	1	2	3	4	5	6	7	8	9	10	Final
Northwest Territories/Yukon (Galusha) 🔨	0	1	0	1	0	2	0	0	2	0	6
Prince Edward Island (Birt)	0	0	2	0	2	0	1	1	0	1	7

Sheet C	1	2	3	4	5	6	7	8	9	10	Final
Newfoundland and Labrador (Devereaux) 🔨	0	1	0	0	3	0	1	0	2	0	7
New Brunswick (Crawford)	1	0	2	2	0	1	0	2	0	2	10

Sheet D	1	2	3	4	5	6	7	8	9	10	Final
Saskatchewan (Shumay)	0	0	1	0	0	1	0	0	X	X	2
Ontario (Homan) 🔨	2	0	0	1	1	0	0	4	X	X	8

=== Draw 11 ===
Wednesday, February 20, 7:00 pm

Sheet A	1	2	3	4	5	6	7	8	9	10	Final
Northwest Territories/Yukon (Galusha)	0	1	0	1	0	0	1	0	X	X	3
Alberta (Moore) 🔨	3	0	2	0	3	0	0	1	X	X	9

Sheet B	1	2	3	4	5	6	7	8	9	10	11	Final
Nova Scotia (Arsenault) 🔨	1	0	1	0	1	1	1	1	0	0	1	7
Newfoundland and Labrador (Devereaux)	0	1	0	1	0	0	0	0	3	1	0	6

Sheet C	1	2	3	4	5	6	7	8	9	10	Final
British Columbia (Scott) 🔨	1	0	1	0	3	0	1	0	2	1	9
Prince Edward Island (Birt)	0	2	0	2	0	3	0	1	0	0	8

Sheet D	1	2	3	4	5	6	7	8	9	10	Final
New Brunswick (Crawford)	0	0	0	2	0	0	1	0	5	X	8
Quebec (Ross) 🔨	0	0	1	0	1	1	0	1	0	X	4

=== Draw 12 ===
Thursday, February 21, 9:00 am

Sheet B	1	2	3	4	5	6	7	8	9	10	Final
Saskatchewan (Shumay)	0	1	0	0	2	1	1	1	1	X	7
Canada (Nedohin) 🔨	2	0	2	1	0	0	0	0	0	X	5

Sheet C	1	2	3	4	5	6	7	8	9	10	Final
Manitoba (Jones)	0	0	0	4	0	2	0	2	1	X	9
Ontario (Homan) 🔨	1	1	0	0	3	0	2	0	0	X	7

=== Draw 13 ===
Thursday, February 21, 2:00 pm

Sheet A	1	2	3	4	5	6	7	8	9	10	Final
Nova Scotia (Arsenault)	0	3	0	1	0	1	2	2	0	X	9
Prince Edward Island (Birt) 🔨	1	0	1	0	2	0	0	0	2	X	6

Sheet B	1	2	3	4	5	6	7	8	9	10	Final
New Brunswick (Crawford) 🔨	3	1	2	1	0	2	0	X	X	X	9
Alberta (Moore)	0	0	0	0	1	0	2	X	X	X	3

Sheet C	1	2	3	4	5	6	7	8	9	10	11	Final
Northwest Territories/Yukon (Galusha) 🔨	1	0	0	0	0	0	2	1	3	0	0	7
Quebec (Ross)	0	2	1	0	2	1	0	0	0	1	1	8

Sheet D	1	2	3	4	5	6	7	8	9	10	Final
Newfoundland and Labrador (Devereaux)	0	1	1	0	1	0	0	0	1	X	4
British Columbia (Scott) 🔨	2	0	0	1	0	2	1	1	0	X	7

=== Draw 14 ===
Thursday, February 21, 7:30 pm

Sheet A	1	2	3	4	5	6	7	8	9	10	Final
British Columbia (Scott) 🔨	1	0	4	0	0	2	2	X	X	X	9
Saskatchewan (Shumay)	0	1	0	1	0	0	0	X	X	X	2

Sheet B	1	2	3	4	5	6	7	8	9	10	Final
Quebec (Ross)	0	0	0	0	0	1	0	X	X	X	1
Manitoba (Jones) 🔨	2	0	0	1	2	0	2	X	X	X	7

Sheet C	1	2	3	4	5	6	7	8	9	10	Final
Alberta (Moore) 🔨	0	0	0	0	1	0	1	0	1	0	3
Canada (Nedohin)	0	0	1	0	0	1	0	1	0	2	5

Sheet D	1	2	3	4	5	6	7	8	9	10	Final
Ontario (Homan)	0	0	2	0	0	0	2	0	0	2	6
Nova Scotia (Arsenault) 🔨	0	1	0	1	1	1	0	1	0	0	5

=== Draw 15 ===
Friday, February 22, 9:00 am

Sheet A	1	2	3	4	5	6	7	8	9	10	11	Final
Newfoundland and Labrador (Devereaux)	0	1	1	0	2	0	0	0	3	0	1	8
Quebec (Ross) 🔨	1	0	0	1	0	1	2	1	0	1	0	7

Sheet B	1	2	3	4	5	6	7	8	9	10	Final
British Columbia (Scott) 🔨	3	0	0	2	0	2	1	0	0	1	9
Northwest Territories/Yukon (Galusha)	0	2	1	0	2	0	0	1	1	0	7

Sheet C	1	2	3	4	5	6	7	8	9	10	Final
New Brunswick (Crawford)	1	0	2	0	2	0	0	2	0	1	8
Nova Scotia (Arsenault) 🔨	0	1	0	2	0	1	1	0	1	0	6

Sheet D	1	2	3	4	5	6	7	8	9	10	Final
Prince Edward Island (Birt)	0	1	2	0	1	0	0	3	1	X	8
Alberta (Moore) 🔨	3	0	0	1	0	0	0	0	0	X	4

=== Draw 16 ===
Friday, February 22, 2:00 pm

Sheet A	1	2	3	4	5	6	7	8	9	10	Final
Manitoba (Jones) 🔨	1	2	2	0	1	1	0	0	0	0	7
New Brunswick (Crawford)	0	0	0	1	0	0	2	1	1	1	6

Sheet B	1	2	3	4	5	6	7	8	9	10	Final
Prince Edward Island (Birt)	0	0	1	0	0	1	0	X	X	X	2
Ontario (Homan) 🔨	3	2	0	0	3	0	2	X	X	X	10

Sheet C	1	2	3	4	5	6	7	8	9	10	Final
Saskatchewan (Shumay)	2	0	0	2	1	0	1	0	0	2	8
Newfoundland and Labrador (Devereaux) 🔨	0	1	2	0	0	1	0	1	2	0	7

Sheet D	1	2	3	4	5	6	7	8	9	10	Final
Canada (Nedohin) 🔨	2	0	3	1	0	0	1	1	0	0	8
Northwest Territories/Yukon (Galusha)	0	2	0	0	3	1	0	0	2	2	10

=== Draw 17 ===
Friday, February 22, 7:30 pm

Sheet A	1	2	3	4	5	6	7	8	9	10	Final
Ontario (Homan) 🔨	0	2	1	0	1	0	0	1	0	1	6
Canada (Nedohin)	0	0	0	2	0	2	0	0	1	0	5

Sheet B	1	2	3	4	5	6	7	8	9	10	Final
Alberta (Moore) 🔨	0	0	0	0	1	0	0	1	X	X	2
Nova Scotia (Arsenault)	0	1	0	1	0	2	2	0	X	X	6

Sheet C	1	2	3	4	5	6	7	8	9	10	Final
Quebec (Ross) 🔨	0	1	0	2	0	1	0	1	0	X	5
British Columbia (Scott)	0	0	3	0	2	0	3	0	1	X	9

Sheet D	1	2	3	4	5	6	7	8	9	10	Final
Manitoba (Jones)	0	2	0	1	2	2	0	0	1	X	8
Saskatchewan (Shumay) 🔨	1	0	1	0	0	0	1	1	0	X	4

== Playoffs ==
Page playoff system
1	Manitoba	5
2	Ontario	8
3	British Columbia	4
4	Canada	8

Semifinal
1	Manitoba	8
4	Canada	5

Final
2	Ontario	9
1	Manitoba	6

Bronze Medal Game
4	Canada	8
3	British Columbia	10

=== 3 vs. 4 ===
Saturday, February 23, 2:00 pm

Sheet B	1	2	3	4	5	6	7	8	9	10	Final
British Columbia (Scott) 🔨	0	0	0	0	1	0	1	0	2	X	4
Canada (Nedohin)	1	0	1	1	0	3	0	2	0	X	8

Player percentages
British Columbia		Canada	
Sarah Wazney	91%	Laine Peters	95%
Sasha Carter	88%	Jessica Mair	94%
Jeanna Schraeder	76%	Beth Iskiw	90%
Kelly Scott	71%	Heather Nedohin	82%
Total	82%	Total	90%

=== 1 vs. 2 ===
Saturday, February 23, 7:00 pm

Sheet B	1	2	3	4	5	6	7	8	9	10	Final
Manitoba (Jones) 🔨	0	2	0	1	0	0	0	2	0	X	5
Ontario (Homan)	2	0	2	0	1	1	1	0	1	X	8

Player percentages
Manitoba		Ontario	
Dawn Askin	94%	Lisa Weagle	81%
Jill Officer	90%	Alison Kreviazuk	94%
Kaitlyn Lawes	84%	Emma Miskew	86%
Jennifer Jones	79%	Rachel Homan	89%
Total	87%	Total	88%

=== Semifinal ===
Sunday, February 24, 9:00 am

Sheet B	1	2	3	4	5	6	7	8	9	10	Final
Manitoba (Jones) 🔨	1	0	0	1	0	0	2	2	0	2	8
Canada (Nedohin)	0	2	0	0	2	0	0	0	1	0	5

Player percentages
Manitoba		Canada	
Dawn Askin	93%	Laine Peters	95%
Jill Officer	79%	Jessica Mair	86%
Kaitlyn Lawes	75%	Beth Iskiw	90%
Jennifer Jones	82%	Heather Nedohin	84%
Total	82%	Total	89%

=== Bronze medal game ===
Sunday, February 24, 2:00 pm

Sheet B	1	2	3	4	5	6	7	8	9	10	Final
Canada (Nedohin)	0	0	4	0	1	0	0	3	0	0	8
British Columbia (Scott) 🔨	2	0	0	3	0	0	3	0	1	1	10

Player percentages
Canada		British Columbia	
Laine Peters	93%	Sarah Wazney	93%
Jessica Mair	88%	Sasha Carter	89%
Beth Iskiw	71%	Jeanna Schraeder	89%
Heather Nedohin	74%	Kelly Scott	88%
Total	81%	Total	89%

=== Final ===
Sunday, February 24, 7:00 pm

Sheet B	1	2	3	4	5	6	7	8	9	10	Final
Ontario (Homan) 🔨	3	0	0	0	1	0	3	2	0	X	9
Manitoba (Jones)	0	1	0	1	0	2	0	0	2	X	6

Player percentages
Ontario		Manitoba	
Lisa Weagle	86%	Dawn Askin	98%
Alison Kreviazuk	96%	Jill Officer	80%
Emma Miskew	81%	Kaitlyn Lawes	94%
Rachel Homan	93%	Jennifer Jones	84%
Total	89%	Total	89%

2013 Scotties Tournament of Hearts
(Ontario)
Ontario
Fifth title

== Statistics ==
=== Top 5 player percentages ===
Round robin only

Leads	%
(Manitoba) Dawn Askin	89
(Canada) Laine Peters	84
(Nova Scotia) Jenn Baxter	83
(Ontario) Lisa Weagle	83
(British Columbia) Sarah Wazney	82

Seconds	%
(Manitoba) Jill Officer	84
(Ontario) Alison Kreviazuk	84
(British Columbia) Sasha Carter	82
(Canada) Jessica Mair	82
(Nova Scotia) Colleen Jones	80

Thirds	%
(Manitoba) Kaitlyn Lawes	82
(Canada) Beth Iskiw	80
(British Columbia) Jeanna Schraeder	80
(Ontario) Emma Miskew	79
(Nova Scotia) Kim Kelly	76

Skips	%
(Manitoba) Jennifer Jones	86
(Ontario) Rachel Homan	83
(Canada) Heather Nedohin	80
(Nova Scotia) Mary-Anne Arsenault	76
(British Columbia) Kelly Scott	76

== Awards ==
The awards and all-star teams are as follows:

All-Star Teams

First Team

- Skip: Jennifer Jones, Manitoba
- Third: Kaitlyn Lawes, Manitoba
- Second: Alison Kreviazuk, Ontario
- Lead: Dawn Askin, Manitoba

Second Team

- Skip: Rachel Homan, Ontario
- Third: Jeanna Schraeder, British Columbia
- Second: Jill Officer, Manitoba
- Lead: Laine Peters, Canada

Marj Mitchell Sportsmanship Award

- Sasha Carter, British Columbia

Joan Mead Builder Award

- Andrew Klaver, Scotties Tournament of Hearts photographer

Sandra Schmirler Most Valuable Player Award

- Lisa Weagle, Ontario lead

Shot of the Week Award

- Rachel Homan, Ontario skip

== Provincial and territorial playdowns ==
- 2013 Alberta Scotties Tournament of Hearts
- 2013 British Columbia Scotties Tournament of Hearts
- 2013 Manitoba Scotties Tournament of Hearts
- 2013 New Brunswick Scotties Tournament of Hearts
- 2013 Newfoundland and Labrador Scotties Tournament of Hearts
- 2013 Nova Scotia Scotties Tournament of Hearts
- 2013 Ontario Scotties Tournament of Hearts
- 2013 Prince Edward Island Scotties Tournament of Hearts
- 2013 Quebec Scotties Tournament of Hearts
- 2013 Saskatchewan Scotties Tournament of Hearts
- (Northwest Territories) 2013 NWT/Yukon Scotties Tournament of Hearts
