= Alison Kreviazuk =

Canadian curler

- Curler
- Born: September 27, 1988 (age 38); Mississauga, Ontario, Canada

Curling career
- Member Association: Ontario (2002–2014); Sweden (2014–present)
- Hearts: 3 (2011, 2013, 2014)
- World Championship: 2 (2013, 2014)
- Top CTRS ranking: 1st (2012–13)
- Grand Slam victories: 2: Masters (2012, 2013)
Medal record
Women's curling
Representing Canada
World Curling Championships
Silver medal – second place	2014 Saint John
Bronze medal – third place	2013 Riga
World Junior Curling Championships
Silver medal – second place	2010 Flims
Representing Ontario
Canadian Olympic Curling Trials
Bronze medal – third place	2013 Winnipeg
Scotties Tournament of Hearts
Gold medal – first place	2013 Kingston
Gold medal – first place	2014 Montreal

Alison Blair Kreviazuk (/krɛvˈəzək/; born September 27, 1988) is a Canadian curler. Kreviazuk was born in Mississauga, Ontario, and grew up in the Nepean sector of Ottawa. She was the longtime second for the Rachel Homan rink, playing with her from 2002 to 2014. She currently serves as a national coach with the Swedish Curling Association.

== Career ==
=== 2002 to 2014 ===
Kreviazuk had been a member of the Homan rink from when it was formed in 2002, except some of the 2005–06 season and the 2009–10 season when she was too old to play for the team in some junior events, as she is a year older than Homan and her vice, Emma Miskew.

Kreviazuk won three provincial Bantam titles as a member of the team, before she was too old to play at that level. The Homan rink would go on to win a fourth title without Kreviazuk. She later re-joined the team to play at the Junior level, and was a member of the team that won the 2009 provincial junior championship, and lost in the 2009 Canadian Junior Curling Championships finals.

Kreviazuk remained on the team the following season for World Curling Tour events and at the Canadian Olympic Curling Pre-Trials, but she was too old to play in junior events that season, and was replaced by Laura Crocker for junior events. The team won the Canadian Junior Curling Championships without Kreviazuk, but she would be invited to play as the Alternate for the team at the 2010 World Junior Curling Championships, as the age limit for the World Juniors was six months older than that of the Canadian Juniors.

When the rest of the team graduated from the junior levels, Kreviazuk joined the team as a full member once again for the 2010–11 curling season. Kreviazuk won two Ontario Scotties Tournament of Hearts with the team (2011 & 2013) and earned a berth into the 2014 Scotties Tournament of Hearts by virtue of winning the right to be Team Canada as the 2013 Scotties Tournament of Hearts champion team. She has won two Grand Slam events with the team, the 2012 and 2013 Masters of Curling. The rink finished fourth at the 2011 Scotties Tournament of Hearts and won both the 2013 Scotties Tournament of Hearts and 2014 Scotties Tournament of Hearts. They also won a bronze medal at the 2013 World Women's Curling Championship and a silver medal at the 2014 Ford World Women's Curling Championship. At the 2014 Worlds, Kreviazuk won the Frances Brodie Award for sportsmanship.

Kreviazuk left the Homan rink to move to Sweden for the 2014–15 season, and was replaced by Joanne Courtney. Kreviazuk moved to Sweden to be with her boyfriend, Fredrik Lindberg.

=== 2014 to present ===
While she has not curled competitively in Sweden since moving there, instead focusing on coaching, Kreviazuk did return to Canada to play in the 2015 Players' Championship for the Margaretha Sigfridsson rink. The following season, Kreviazuk got the opportunity to throw lead rocks for the Jennifer Jones rink at the 2015 Stockholm Ladies Cup, filling in for regular lead Dawn McEwen. Kreviazuk also attended the 2017 Canadian Olympic Curling Trials as the alternate for Allison Flaxey's team.

== Personal life ==
Kreviazuk graduated from the University of Ottawa in 2009 with a degree in leisure studies and worked in sales for Capital Fiat. She is the second cousin of singer Chantal Kreviazuk, although Alison's surname is pronounced slightly differently. Her sisters are former teammate Lynn Kreviazuk and Cheryl Kreviazuk, another competitive curler.

Kreviazuk now lives in Karlstad, Sweden and is married to Fredrik Lindberg.

== Teams ==
Season	Skip	Third	Second	Lead
2002–03	Rachel Homan	Emma Miskew	Alison Kreviazuk	Nikki Johnston
2003–04	Rachel Homan	Emma Miskew	Alison Kreviazuk	Nikki Johnston
2004–05	Rachel Homan	Emma Miskew	Alison Kreviazuk	Nikki Johnston
2005–06	Rachel Homan	Emma Miskew	Alison Kreviazuk	Nikki Johnston
2006–07	Rachel Homan	Emma Miskew	Alison Kreviazuk	Nikki Johnston
2007–08	Rachel Homan	Emma Miskew	Alison Kreviazuk	Lynn Kreviazuk
2008–09	Rachel Homan	Emma Miskew	Alison Kreviazuk	Lynn Kreviazuk
2009–10	Rachel Homan	Emma Miskew	Alison Kreviazuk	Lynn Kreviazuk
2010–11	Rachel Homan	Emma Miskew	Alison Kreviazuk	Lisa Weagle
2011–12	Rachel Homan	Emma Miskew	Alison Kreviazuk	Lisa Weagle
2012–13	Rachel Homan	Emma Miskew	Alison Kreviazuk	Lisa Weagle
2013–14	Rachel Homan	Emma Miskew	Alison Kreviazuk	Lisa Weagle
