= Teri Udle =

Canadian curler

- Curler
- Born: April 11, 1981 (age 45); Amherst, Nova Scotia

Team
- Curling club: Mayflower CC, Halifax, NS

Curling career
- Hearts: 5: (2007,2011, 2012, 2014,2016)
Medal record
Curling
Scotties Tournament of Hearts
| Bronze medal – third place | 2011 Charlottetown |

Teri Udle (born April 11, 1981 in Amherst, Nova Scotia as Teri Lake) is a Canadian curler from Halifax, Nova Scotia.

Udle made her first national curling debut at the 2000 Canadian Junior Curling Championships. She skipped her own team, representing Nova Scotia at the women's event. Udle's team would have a difficult time at the event finishing with a round robin record of 4–8.

Udle's career led her to teaming up with Jill Mouzar. Playing second for Mouzar, the team won the Nova Scotia Scotties, representing the province at the 2007 Scotties Tournament of Hearts, in Lethbridge, Alberta. Their provincial success did not hold strong at the national level and the team finished with a 3–8 record. Udle continued to play with Mouzar until 2010, when Mouzar moved to Ontario. Six time Canadian, and two time World Champion Colleen Jones took over the squad as skip. The new Jones squad was preparing to enter the qualification round for the 2011 Nova Scotia Scotties Tournament of Hearts, when Jones was hospitalized for bacterial meningitis. With Jones out, the team recruited Danielle Parsons to play third, Heather Smith-Dacey took over as skip, and the team went on to qualify for the event, and eventually won the event, defeating Jones’ former teammate Mary-Anne Arsenault in the semi-final and Theresa Breen in the final. The team went to the 2011 Scotties Tournament of Hearts, where their success would continue. The team would finish round robin play with a 7–4 record, which took them to a tie breaker game against British Columbia's Kelly Scott. After defeating Scott in the tie breaker, the team met Ontario's Rachel Homan. Homan defeated the Smith-Dacey team in the 3-4 match, sending them to the first ever Bronze Medal Game, where the two teams met again. Smith-Dacey's team defeated Ontario 9-7, winning the bronze medal game.

For the 2011–2012 season the team continued without Colleen Jones, who has recruited a new team.

== Personal life ==
Udle is employed as a manager of corporate communications at Jazz Aviation LP. She is married to Jordan Udle.
