= Lindsay Warkentin =

Canadian curler

- Curler
- Born: November 8, 1982 (age 44); Winnipeg, Manitoba, Canada

Team
- Curling club: Fort Rouge CC, Winnipeg, MB
- Skip: Kristy McDonald
- Third: Lisa Blixhavn
- Second: Leslie Wilson-Westcott
- Lead: Raunora Westcott
- Alternate: Lindsay Warkentin

Curling career
- Member Association: Manitoba
- Hearts: 1 (2014)
- Top CTRS ranking: 5th (2010–11, 2012–13, 2013–14)
- Grand Slam victories: 1 (2010 Manitoba Lotteries Women's Curling Classic)
Medal record
Women's curling
Representing Manitoba
Scotties Tournament of Hearts
Bronze medal – third place	2014 Montreal

Lindsay Nicole Warkentin (born Titheridge, November 8, 1982 in Winnipeg, Manitoba) is a Canadian curler. She previously played lead for the Chelsea Carey team.

== Career ==
As a junior curler, Warkentin represented Manitoba at the 1999 Canada Winter Games, and she won the Manitoba junior championship in 2001, playing second for Allison Nimik (Flaxey). The team represented Manitoba at the 2001 Canadian Junior Curling Championships, where they finished with a 4-8 record. In 2003, Titheridge lost in the Manitoba junior final.

After juniors, Warkentin joined the Darcy Robertson rink at lead. She joined the Carey rink in 2008. Since she joined the rink, the team has won one Grand Slam event, the 2010 Manitoba Lotteries Women's Curling Classic and one provincial championship, the 2014 Manitoba Scotties Tournament of Hearts. The team has also played in three Canada Cups, in 2010, 2011 and 2012- finishing 2nd in 2011. The team also played in the 2013 Canadian Olympic Curling Trials, where they placed 4th. They won a bronze medal at the 2014 Scotties Tournament of Hearts.

== Personal life ==
Warkentin has a Bachelor's in Nursing, and works as a nurse at the Grace Hospital in Winnipeg.
