= Kristen Foster =

Canadian curler

- Curler
- Born: January 27, 1987 (age 39); Morden, Manitoba

Curling career
- Hearts: 1 (2014)
- World Championship: 0
- Top CTRS ranking: 5th (2010-11, 2012-13, 2013-14)
- Grand Slam victories: 1: (Manitoba Lotteries: 2010)
Medal record
Women's Curling
Representing Manitoba
Scotties Tournament of Hearts
Bronze medal – third place	2014 Montreal

Kristen Foster (born January 27, 1987, in Morden, Manitoba) is a Canadian curler. In 2003, she led her Morden Collegiate Institute team to a Manitoba High School championship.

Foster played with the Chelsea Carey rink since it formed in 2007. Since joining the rink, the team has won a Grand Slam event, the 2010 Manitoba Lotteries Women's Curling Classic and a provincial championship, the 2014 Manitoba Scotties Tournament of Hearts. The team has played in three Canada Cups, in 2010, 2011 and 2012- finishing 2nd in 2011. The team also played in the 2013 Canadian Olympic Curling Trials, placing 4th. They won the bronze medal at the 2014 Scotties Tournament of Hearts. After the season, she joined the Allison Flaxey rink.

== Personal life ==
In 2014, Foster was a staff accountant with Bridge Road Developments and has been a CGA student.
