= 2022 World Junior-B Curling Championships (December) =

- Host city: Lohja, Finland
- Arena: Kisakallio Sports Institute
- Dates: December 8–19
- Men's winner: China
- Skip: Fei Xueqing
- Third: Guan Tianqi
- Second: Li Zhichao
- Lead: Xie Xingyin
- Alternate: Ye Jianjun
- Coach: Xu Xiaoming
- Finalist: Italy (Colli)
- Women's winner: Canada
- Skip: Emily Deschenes
- Third: Lauren Ferguson
- Second: Alison Umlah
- Lead: Cate Fitzgerald
- Coach: Mary Mattatall / Taylour Stevens
- Finalist: Scotland (Henderson)

The 2022 World Junior-B Curling Championships were held from December 8 to 19 at the Kisakallio Sports Institute in Lohja, Finland. The top three men's and women's teams qualified for the 2023 World Junior Curling Championships.

== Men ==
=== Teams ===
The teams are listed as follows:

Austria	China	Czech Republic	Denmark	England
Skip: Matthäus Hofer; Third: Johann Karg; Second: David Zott; Lead: Moritz Jöchl	Skip: Fei Xueqing; Third: Guan Tianqi; Second: Li Zhichao; Lead: Xie Xingyin; Alternate: Ye Jianjun	Skip: Jakub Hanák; Third: Jakub Rychlý; Second: David Škácha; Lead: Matěj Koudelka; Alternate: Jakub Matějíček	Fourth: Jonathan Vilandt; Skip: Jacob Schmidt; Second: Alexander Qvist; Lead: Kasper Jurlander Boge; Alternate: Oliver Rasmussen	Skip: Matthew Waring; Third: George Watmough; Second: Oliver Ablett; Lead: Oliver Johnson; Alternate: Niall McLoughlin
Hong Kong	Hungary	Italy	Japan	Kazakhstan
Skip: Cheng Ching-nam; Third: Lai Chung-hei Jonas; Second: Cheng Ching-kiu; Lead: Cheng Ching-him	Skip: Viktor Nagy; Third: Bálint Asztalos; Second: Andras Trauttwein; Lead: Bajan Kan Ferenci; Alternate: Botond Boros	Skip: Giacomo Colli; Third: Francesco de Zanna; Second: Simone Piffer; Lead: Stefano Gilli; Alternate: Francesco Vigliani	Skip: Takumi Maeda; Third: Uryu Kamikawa; Second: Hiroki Maeda; Lead: Asei Nakahara; Alternate: Haruki Watanabe	Skip: Adil Zhumagozha; Third: Aidos Alliyar; Second: Arman Irjanov; Lead: Ibragim Tastemir; Alternate: Abdikarim Zhumabek
Kenya	Latvia	Mongolia	Netherlands	New Zealand
Skip: Hassnein Sha; Third: Mike Amolo; Second: Trevor Mwangi; Lead: Blaise Winston	Skip: Kristaps Zass; Third: Eduards Seļiverstovs; Second: Toms Sondors; Lead: Deniss Smirnovs; Alternate: Krišjānis Java	Skip: Bayarbat Zolbayar; Third: Tuguldur Damdin; Second: Javkhlantugs Mijiddorj; Lead: Margad Nandin-Erdene	Skip: Simon Spits; Third: Floris Ros; Second: Izaak Murray; Lead: Hessel Janssens	Skip: Hunter Walker; Third: Jayden Bishop; Second: Sam Flanagan; Lead: William Becker; Alternate: Darcy Nevill
Nigeria	Poland	Slovenia	Spain	Sweden
Skip: Kamsiyochukwu Dike; Third: Ebube Chuk Wuemeka; Second: Fatiu Danmola; Lead: Goodnews Charles; Alternate: Great Umoren	Skip: Antoni Frynia; Third: Kacper Mucha; Second: Bartlomiej Mosiolek; Lead: Jan Witkowski; Alternate: Dominik Kozera	Skip: Bine Sever; Third: Jakob Omerzel; Second: Javor Brin Zelinka; Lead: Maks Omerzel; Alternate: Nejc Vidmar	Fourth: Ismael Mingorance; Skip: Aleix Raubert; Second: Oriol Gastó; Lead: Eneko Saez de Ocariz; Alternate: Javier Carasa	Skip: Axel Landelius; Third: Alfons Johansson; Second: Jacob Hanna; Lead: Alexander Palm; Alternate: Olle Moberg
Turkey	Ukraine			
Skip: Serkan Karagöz; Third: Selahattin Eser; Second: Mehmet Bayramoğlu; Lead: Bilal Nerse; Alternate: Muhammed Zenit	Skip: Eduard Nikolov; Third: Yaroslav Shchur; Second: Mykyta Velychko; Lead: Artem Suhak			

=== Round-robin standings ===
Final round-robin standings

Key
Teams to Playoffs

Group A	Skip	W	L	W–L	DSC
Denmark	Jacob Schmidt	5	1	1–0	66.79
China	Fei Xueqing	5	1	0–1	42.61
Ukraine	Eduard Nikolov	4	2	1–0	46.93
New Zealand	Hunter Walker	4	2	0–1	72.58
Hong Kong	Cheng Ching-nam	2	4	–	110.99
Kazakhstan	Adil Zhumagozha	1	5	–	55.82
England	Matthew Waring	0	6	–	112.40

Group B	Skip	W	L	W–L	DSC
Sweden	Axel Landelius	6	0	–	35.42
Japan	Takumi Maeda	5	1	–	40.67
Slovenia	Bine Sever	3	3	1–1	57.56
Czech Republic	Jakub Hanák	3	3	1–1	74.07
Netherlands	Simon Spits	3	3	1–1	81.08
Mongolia	Bayarbat Zolbayar	1	5	–	171.44
Kenya	Hassnein Sha	0	6	–	—

- Kenya did not show up for the tournament, and therefore forfeited their matches

Group C	Skip	W	L	W–L	DSC
Italy	Giacomo Colli	7	0	–	45.02
Turkey	Serkan Karagöz	6	1	–	58.19
Latvia	Kristaps Zass	5	2	–	97.03
Austria	Matthäus Hofer	4	3	–	62.66
Poland	Antoni Frynia	2	5	1–1	93.12
Hungary	Viktor Nagy	2	5	1–1	116.11
Spain	Aleix Raubert	2	5	1–1	127.63
Nigeria	Kamsiyochukwu Dike	0	7	–	186.24

Group A Round Robin Summary Table
Pos.	Country	China	Denmark	England	Hong Kong	Kazakhstan	New Zealand	Ukraine	Record
2	China	—	3–7	15–2	14–2	12–2	7–6	6–2	5–1
1	Denmark	7–3	—	8–3	9–0	5–4	3–4	5–4	5–1
7	England	2–15	3–8	—	2–6	2–8	1–7	3–7	0–6
5	Hong Kong	2–14	0–9	6–2	—	5–3	1–8	4–10	2–4
6	Kazakhstan	2–12	4–5	8–2	3–5	—	1–7	5–7	1–5
4	New Zealand	6–7	4–3	7–1	8–1	7–1	—	5–6	4–2
3	Ukraine	2–6	4–5	7–3	10–4	7–5	6–5	—	4–2

Group B Round Robin Summary Table
Pos.	Country	Czech Republic	Japan	Kenya	Mongolia	Netherlands	Slovenia	Sweden	Record
4	Czech Republic	—	6–8	W–L	20–1	5–6	7–2	2–6	3–3
2	Japan	8–6	—	W–L	22–0	8–2	6–3	8–12	5–1
DNS	Kenya	L–W	L–W	—	L–W	L–W	L–W	L–W	0–6
6	Mongolia	1–20	0–22	W–L	—	1–12	2–10	0–27	1–5
5	Netherlands	6–5	2–8	W–L	12–1	—	3–10	2–10	3–3
3	Slovenia	2–7	3–6	W–L	10–2	10–3	—	2–8	3–3
1	Sweden	6–2	12–8	W–L	27–0	10–2	8–2	—	6–0

Group C Round Robin Summary Table
Pos.	Country	Austria	Hungary	Italy	Latvia	Nigeria	Poland	Spain	Turkey	Record
4	Austria	—	4–2	3–8	7–9	20–2	11–4	10–5	3–8	4–3
6	Hungary	2–4	—	1–9	3–6	14–2	6–2	1–6	4–9	2–5
1	Italy	8–3	9–1	—	9–3	18–3	9–2	9–2	9–6	7–0
3	Latvia	9–7	6–3	3–9	—	24–0	6–3	6–4	3–9	5–2
8	Nigeria	2–20	2–14	3–18	0–24	—	1–19	0–27	5–14	0–7
5	Poland	4–11	4–6	2–9	3–6	19–1	—	7–6	3–5	2–5
7	Spain	5–10	6–1	2–9	4–6	27–0	6–7	—	4–11	2–5
2	Turkey	8–3	9–4	6–9	9–3	14–5	5–3	11–4	—	6–1

=== Round-robin results ===
All draw times are listed in Eastern European Summer Time (UTC+03:00).

==== Draw 1 ====
Thursday, December 8, 8:00

Sheet A	1	2	3	4	5	6	7	8	Final
Austria (Hofer) 🔨	0	0	1	1	1	0	1	X	4
Hungary (Nagy)	0	1	0	0	0	1	0	X	2

Sheet C	1	2	3	4	5	6	7	8	Final
Nigeria (Dike)	0	0	0	0	0	0	X	X	0
Latvia (Zass) 🔨	5	6	3	4	2	4	X	X	24

Sheet E	1	2	3	4	5	6	7	8	Final
Poland (Frynia)	0	0	2	0	0	0	1	X	3
Turkey (Karagöz) 🔨	2	0	0	0	1	2	0	X	5

Sheet B	1	2	3	4	5	6	7	8	Final
Spain (Raubert)	0	1	0	0	0	1	X	X	2
Italy (Colli) 🔨	3	0	3	2	1	0	X	X	9

Sheet D	1	2	3	4	5	6	7	8	Final
Sweden (Landelius) 🔨	1	0	2	2	1	0	4	X	10
Netherlands (Spits)	0	1	0	0	0	1	0	X	2

==== Draw 2 ====
Thursday, December 8, 12:00

Sheet B	1	2	3	4	5	6	7	8	Final
Slovenia (Sever)	0	0	0	0	0	2	0	X	2
Czech Republic (Hanák) 🔨	0	0	3	1	1	0	2	X	7

Sheet D	1	2	3	4	5	6	7	8	9	Final
Denmark (Schmidt) 🔨	1	0	0	2	1	0	0	0	1	5
Kazakhstan (Zhumagozha)	0	1	1	0	0	0	1	1	0	4

Sheet F	1	2	3	4	5	6	7	8	Final
England (Waring)	0	0	1	0	0	1	0	X	2
China (Fei) 🔨	4	2	0	3	2	0	4	X	15

Sheet C	Final
Japan (Maeda) 🔨	W
Kenya (Sha)	L

Sheet E	1	2	3	4	5	6	7	8	Final
Hong Kong (Cheng)	1	0	0	0	0	0	X	X	1
New Zealand (Walker) 🔨	0	0	1	2	3	2	X	X	8

==== Draw 3 ====
Thursday, December 8, 16:00

Sheet B	1	2	3	4	5	6	7	8	Final
Sweden (Landelius) 🔨	6	3	2	5	5	6	X	X	27
Mongolia (Zolbayar)	0	0	0	0	0	0	X	X	0

Sheet D	1	2	3	4	5	6	7	8	Final
Austria (Hofer) 🔨	4	0	4	6	6	0	X	X	20
Nigeria (Dike)	0	1	0	0	0	1	X	X	2

Sheet F	1	2	3	4	5	6	7	8	Final
Turkey (Karagöz) 🔨	1	1	0	2	0	2	0	X	6
Italy (Colli)	0	0	3	0	3	0	3	X	9

Sheet C	1	2	3	4	5	6	7	8	Final
Poland (Frynia) 🔨	1	2	0	4	0	0	0	0	7
Spain (Raubert)	0	0	2	0	1	1	1	1	6

Sheet E	1	2	3	4	5	6	7	8	Final
Latvia (Zass)	1	1	0	2	1	0	1	X	7
Hungary (Nagy) 🔨	0	0	1	0	0	2	0	X	3

==== Draw 4 ====
Thursday, December 8, 20:00

Sheet A	1	2	3	4	5	6	7	8	Final
Denmark (Schmidt) 🔨	2	0	0	2	1	1	3	X	9
Hong Kong (Cheng)	0	0	0	0	0	0	0	X	0

Sheet C	1	2	3	4	5	6	7	8	Final
China (Fei) 🔨	0	0	2	0	0	3	1	X	6
Ukraine (Nikolov)	0	0	0	1	1	0	0	X	2

Sheet E	1	2	3	4	5	6	7	8	Final
Kazakhstan (Zhumagozha) 🔨	2	1	0	2	2	0	1	X	8
England (Waring)	0	0	1	0	0	1	0	X	2

Sheet B	Final
Netherlands (Spits) 🔨	W
Kenya (Sha)	L

Sheet D	1	2	3	4	5	6	7	8	Final
Slovenia (Sever) 🔨	0	0	1	0	1	0	1	X	3
Japan (Maeda)	0	1	0	3	0	2	0	X	6

==== Draw 5 ====
Friday, December 9, 8:00

Sheet B	1	2	3	4	5	6	7	8	Final
Italy (Colli) 🔨	0	1	1	0	3	0	4	X	9
Latvia (Zass)	1	0	0	1	0	1	0	X	3

Sheet D	1	2	3	4	5	6	7	8	Final
Poland (Frynia)	0	1	0	1	0	2	X	X	4
Austria (Hofer) 🔨	1	0	3	0	7	0	X	X	11

Sheet C	1	2	3	4	5	6	7	8	Final
Spain (Raubert) 🔨	5	5	3	3	6	5	X	X	27
Nigeria (Dike)	0	0	0	0	0	0	X	X	0

Sheet F	1	2	3	4	5	6	7	8	Final
Hungary (Nagy)	1	0	0	1	0	1	1	0	4
Turkey (Karagöz) 🔨	0	2	1	0	2	0	0	4	9

==== Draw 6 ====
Friday, December 9, 12:00

Sheet A	1	2	3	4	5	6	7	8	Final
Kazakhstan (Zhumagozha) 🔨	1	0	1	0	0	0	X	X	2
China (Fei)	0	2	0	4	2	4	X	X	12

Sheet C	1	2	3	4	5	6	7	8	Final
Slovenia (Sever)	0	1	0	0	0	1	X	X	2
Sweden (Landelius) 🔨	2	0	3	1	2	0	X	X	8

Sheet E	1	2	3	4	5	6	7	8	Final
New Zealand (Walker) 🔨	1	0	0	0	1	0	1	1	4
Denmark (Schmidt)	0	0	2	0	0	1	0	0	3

Sheet B	1	2	3	4	5	6	7	8	Final
Ukraine (Nikolov)	2	2	2	1	0	0	3	X	10
Hong Kong (Cheng) 🔨	0	0	0	0	1	3	0	X	4

Sheet D	Final
Czech Republic (Hanák) 🔨	W
Kenya (Sha)	L

Sheet F	1	2	3	4	5	6	7	8	Final
Mongolia (Zolbayar)	0	0	0	0	1	0	0	X	1
Netherlands (Spits) 🔨	0	2	1	5	0	2	2	X	12

==== Draw 7 ====
Friday, December 9, 16:00

Sheet A	1	2	3	4	5	6	7	8	Final
Italy (Colli) 🔨	8	1	0	6	0	3	X	X	18
Nigeria (Dike)	0	0	2	0	1	0	X	X	3

Sheet C	1	2	3	4	5	6	7	8	Final
Turkey (Karagöz) 🔨	2	0	1	0	4	0	1	X	8
Austria (Hofer)	0	1	0	1	0	1	0	X	3

Sheet B	1	2	3	4	5	6	7	8	Final
Hungary (Nagy)	1	1	0	0	2	1	1	X	6
Poland (Frynia) 🔨	0	0	1	1	0	0	0	X	2

Sheet F	1	2	3	4	5	6	7	8	Final
Spain (Raubert)	0	0	1	0	1	0	2	X	4
Latvia (Zass) 🔨	1	3	0	1	0	1	0	X	6

==== Draw 8 ====
Friday, December 9, 20:00

Sheet A	1	2	3	4	5	6	7	8	Final
Sweden (Landelius) 🔨	0	1	0	1	0	3	1	X	6
Czech Republic (Hanák)	0	0	1	0	1	0	0	X	2

Sheet D	1	2	3	4	5	6	7	8	Final
China (Fei) 🔨	0	3	2	4	0	1	4	X	14
Hong Kong (Cheng)	1	0	0	0	1	0	0	X	2

Sheet F	1	2	3	4	5	6	7	8	Final
Ukraine (Nikolov) 🔨	1	0	1	0	2	0	1	1	6
New Zealand (Walker)	0	2	0	1	0	2	0	0	5

Sheet C	1	2	3	4	5	6	7	8	Final
Denmark (Schmidt) 🔨	3	2	0	2	0	1	0	X	8
England (Waring)	0	0	1	0	1	0	1	X	3

Sheet E	1	2	3	4	5	6	7	8	Final
Mongolia (Zolbayar)	0	0	0	0	0	0	X	X	0
Japan (Maeda) 🔨	5	4	1	3	5	4	X	X	22

==== Draw 9 ====
Saturday, December 10, 8:00

Sheet A	1	2	3	4	5	6	7	8	Final
England (Waring)	0	0	1	1	0	1	0	X	3
Ukraine (Nikolov) 🔨	1	2	0	0	2	0	2	X	7

Sheet C	1	2	3	4	5	6	7	8	Final
Czech Republic (Hanák) 🔨	4	6	4	4	2	0	X	X	20
Mongolia (Zolbayar)	0	0	0	0	0	1	X	X	1

Sheet F	Final
Kenya (Sha)	L
Slovenia (Sever) 🔨	W

Sheet B	1	2	3	4	5	6	7	8	Final
China (Fei) 🔨	0	1	0	0	0	2	0	X	3
Denmark (Schmidt)	0	0	1	2	3	0	1	X	7

Sheet E	1	2	3	4	5	6	7	8	Final
Japan (Maeda)	0	4	0	1	0	3	0	0	8
Sweden (Landelius) 🔨	3	0	4	0	2	0	0	3	12

==== Draw 10 ====
Saturday, December 10, 12:00

Sheet B	1	2	3	4	5	6	7	8	Final
Austria (Hofer)	0	5	0	1	0	2	2	X	10
Spain (Raubert) 🔨	2	0	1	0	2	0	0	X	5

Sheet D	1	2	3	4	5	6	7	8	Final
Latvia (Zass)	0	0	1	0	2	0	X	X	3
Turkey (Karagöz) 🔨	0	3	0	2	0	4	X	X	9

Sheet C	1	2	3	4	5	6	7	8	Final
Hungary (Nagy)	0	1	0	0	0	0	X	X	1
Italy (Colli) 🔨	2	0	2	2	1	2	X	X	9

Sheet F	1	2	3	4	5	6	7	8	Final
Nigeria (Dike)	0	0	0	0	0	1	X	X	1
Poland (Frynia) 🔨	3	4	3	2	7	0	X	X	19

==== Draw 11 ====
Saturday, December 10, 16:00

Sheet A	Final
Kenya (Sha)	L
Mongolia (Zolbayar) 🔨	W

Sheet C	1	2	3	4	5	6	7	8	9	Final
New Zealand (Walker)	0	1	0	1	0	1	0	3	0	6
China (Fei) 🔨	3	0	2	0	0	0	1	0	1	7

Sheet E	1	2	3	4	5	6	7	8	Final
Netherlands (Spits) 🔨	0	1	0	2	0	0	X	X	3
Slovenia (Sever)	2	0	1	0	4	3	X	X	10

Sheet B	1	2	3	4	5	6	7	8	Final
Kazakhstan (Zhumagozha)	0	0	3	0	0	0	2	0	5
Ukraine (Nikolov) 🔨	0	2	0	2	1	0	0	2	7

Sheet D	1	2	3	4	5	6	7	8	Final
Hong Kong (Cheng)	2	1	0	1	1	0	1	X	6
England (Waring) 🔨	0	0	1	0	0	1	0	X	2

Sheet F	1	2	3	4	5	6	7	8	Final
Japan (Maeda) 🔨	2	0	3	0	0	3	0	X	8
Czech Republic (Hanák)	0	1	0	2	2	0	1	X	6

==== Draw 12 ====
Saturday, December 10, 20:00

Sheet A	1	2	3	4	5	6	7	8	Final
Turkey (Karagöz) 🔨	1	1	1	0	0	2	0	6	11
Spain (Raubert)	0	0	0	1	2	0	1	0	4

Sheet E	1	2	3	4	5	6	7	8	Final
Hungary (Nagy) 🔨	1	5	2	0	1	1	4	X	14
Nigeria (Dike)	0	0	0	2	0	0	0	X	2

Sheet C	1	2	3	4	5	6	7	8	Final
Italy (Colli)	1	2	3	1	0	2	0	X	9
Poland (Frynia) 🔨	0	0	0	0	1	0	1	X	2

Sheet F	1	2	3	4	5	6	7	8	Final
Latvia (Zass) 🔨	0	2	0	6	1	0	0	X	9
Austria (Hofer)	1	0	1	0	0	3	2	X	7

==== Draw 13 ====
Sunday, December 11, 9:00

Sheet B	Final
Kenya (Sha)	L
Sweden (Landelius) 🔨	W

Sheet E	1	2	3	4	5	6	7	8	9	Final
Czech Republic (Hanák)	1	1	0	1	1	0	1	0	0	5
Netherlands (Spits) 🔨	0	0	3	0	0	1	0	1	1	6

Sheet D	1	2	3	4	5	6	7	8	9	Final
Ukraine (Nikolov) 🔨	0	1	1	0	0	1	1	0	0	4
Denmark (Schmidt)	0	0	0	1	0	0	0	3	1	5

Sheet F	1	2	3	4	5	6	7	8	Final
New Zealand (Walker) 🔨	3	1	1	0	1	1	X	X	7
Kazakhstan (Zhumagozha)	0	0	0	1	0	0	X	X	1

==== Draw 14 ====
Sunday, December 11, 14:00

Sheet A	1	2	3	4	5	6	7	8	Final
Latvia (Zass) 🔨	0	1	1	0	0	0	2	2	6
Poland (Frynia)	0	0	0	1	1	1	0	0	3

Sheet D	1	2	3	4	5	6	7	8	Final
Spain (Raubert) 🔨	2	0	0	2	1	1	X	X	6
Hungary (Nagy)	0	0	1	0	0	0	X	X	1

Sheet B	1	2	3	4	5	6	7	8	Final
Nigeria (Dike)	0	0	0	2	3	0	0	X	5
Turkey (Karagöz) 🔨	2	4	4	0	0	1	3	X	14

Sheet E	1	2	3	4	5	6	7	8	Final
Italy (Colli) 🔨	1	3	0	3	1	0	X	X	8
Austria (Hofer)	0	0	1	0	0	2	X	X	3

==== Draw 15 ====
Sunday, December 11, 19:00

Sheet A	1	2	3	4	5	6	7	8	Final
Netherlands (Spits)	0	0	1	0	0	1	0	X	2
Japan (Maeda) 🔨	0	3	0	1	0	0	4	X	8

Sheet C	1	2	3	4	5	6	7	8	Final
Hong Kong (Cheng)	0	0	0	0	2	0	1	2	5
Kazakhstan (Zhumagozha) 🔨	0	0	0	1	0	2	0	0	3

Sheet B	1	2	3	4	5	6	7	8	Final
England (Waring) 🔨	0	0	0	0	0	1	0	X	1
New Zealand (Walker)	1	1	1	1	1	0	2	X	7

Sheet D	1	2	3	4	5	6	7	8	Final
Mongolia (Zolbayar)	0	0	0	1	0	1	0	X	2
Slovenia (Sever) 🔨	1	1	4	0	2	0	2	X	10

=== Playoffs ===
Quarterfinals
1	Sweden	9
8	Slovenia	3
4	Japan	5
5	China	7
2	Italy	6
7	Ukraine	1
3	Denmark	4
6	Turkey	5

Semifinals
1	Sweden	2
5	China	7
2	Italy	6
6	Turkey	5

Gold medal game
5	China	7
2	Italy	2
Third place
1	Sweden	5
6	Turkey	6

==== Quarterfinals ====
Monday, December 12, 13:00

Sheet B	1	2	3	4	5	6	7	8	Final
Sweden (Landelius) 🔨	3	0	2	1	0	3	0	X	9
Slovenia (Sever)	0	1	0	0	1	0	1	X	3

Sheet A	1	2	3	4	5	6	7	8	Final
Japan (Maeda)	0	3	0	1	0	0	1	X	5
China (Fei) 🔨	2	0	2	0	1	2	0	X	7

Sheet E	1	2	3	4	5	6	7	8	Final
Italy (Colli) 🔨	0	0	1	3	1	1	0	X	6
Ukraine (Nikolov)	0	0	0	0	0	0	1	X	1

Sheet F	1	2	3	4	5	6	7	8	Final
Denmark (Schmidt) 🔨	0	1	0	0	1	0	2	0	4
Turkey (Karagöz)	1	0	1	0	0	2	0	1	5

==== Semifinals ====
Monday, December 12, 18:00

Sheet B	1	2	3	4	5	6	7	8	Final
Sweden (Landelius)	0	0	2	0	0	0	0	X	2
China (Fei) 🔨	0	3	0	1	1	1	1	X	7

Sheet E	1	2	3	4	5	6	7	8	Final
Italy (Colli) 🔨	0	2	0	2	0	0	0	2	6
Turkey (Karagöz)	0	0	1	0	3	1	0	0	5

==== Bronze medal game ====
Tuesday, December 13, 10:00

Sheet D	1	2	3	4	5	6	7	8	Final
Sweden (Landelius) 🔨	2	0	1	0	0	2	0	0	5
Turkey (Karagöz)	0	1	0	1	2	0	1	1	6

==== Gold medal game ====
Tuesday, December 13, 10:00

Sheet C	1	2	3	4	5	6	7	8	Final
China (Fei)	0	0	0	3	0	1	3	X	7
Italy (Colli) 🔨	0	2	0	0	0	0	0	X	2

=== Final standings ===
Key
Teams Advance to the 2023 World Junior Curling Championships

Place	Team
1st place, gold medalist(s)	China
2nd place, silver medalist(s)	Italy
3rd place, bronze medalist(s)	Turkey
4	Sweden
5	Denmark
5	Japan
5	Slovenia
5	Ukraine
9	Latvia
10	Austria
11	New Zealand
12	Czech Republic
13	Netherlands
14	Poland
15	Hong Kong
16	Kazakhstan
17	Hungary
18	Mongolia
19	England
20	Spain
21	Nigeria
DNS	Kenya

== Women ==
=== Teams ===
The teams are listed as follows:

Austria	Brazil	Canada	China	Czech Republic	Denmark
Fourth: Teresa Treichl; Skip: Astrid Pflueger; Second: Emma Müller; Lead: Hannah Wittibschlaeger; Alternate: Elisa Käär	Skip: Gabriela Rogic Farias; Third: Isis Regadas Abreu; Second: Melissa De Castro Sampaio; Lead: Leticia Cid	Skip: Emily Deschenes; Third: Lauren Ferguson; Second: Alison Umlah; Lead: Cate Fitzgerald	Skip: Zhang Jiaqi; Third: Tan Sting; Second: Wen Xinyue; Lead: Li Jiayu	Skip: Kristýna Farková; Third: Julie Zelingrová; Second: Karolina Němcová; Lead: Stella Svitáková; Alternate: Klára Koscelanská	Skip: Karolina Jensen; Third: Gabriella Qvist; Second: Natalie Wiksten; Lead: Maja Nyboe; Alternate: Katrine Schmidt
England	Finland	Hungary	Italy	Kazakhstan	Mongolia
Skip: Mia Andell; Third: Annabelle Martin; Second: Anna Howey; Lead: Phoenix Davies	Skip: Ella Eivola; Third: Josefina Satto; Second: Nea Matero; Lead: Peppi Pippuri; Alternate: Venla Eronen	Skip: Linda Joó; Third: Laura Nagy; Second: Lola Nagy; Lead: Laura Lauchsz; Alternate: Hanna Orbán	Skip: Marta Lo Deserto; Third: Rebecca Mariani; Second: Lucrezia Grande; Lead: Camilla Gilberti; Alternate: Giada Zambelli	Skip: Angelina Ebauyer; Third: Yekaterina Kolykhalova; Second: Tilsimay Alliyarova; Lead: Regina Ebauyer; Alternate: Merey Tastemir	Skip: Enkhzaya Ganbat; Third: Munkhzaya Ganbat; Second: Jargalmaa Bulgan; Lead: Khulan Battulga
Netherlands	New Zealand	Nigeria	Poland	Qatar	Scotland
Skip: Lisenka Bomas; Third: Anandi Bomas; Second: Marit van Valkenhoef; Lead: Linde Nas	Skip: Grace Apuwai-Bishop; Third: Rachel Pitts; Second: Ruby Kinney; Lead: Lucy Neilson; Alternate: Temika Apuwai-Bishop	Skip: Gift Uchegbua; Third: Nimi Wale-Adeogun; Second: Jasmine Oku; Lead: Nelly Uchegbu; Alternate: Ama Oku	Fourth: Klaudia Szmidt; Skip: Monika Wosińska; Second: Paulina Frysz; Lead: Magdalena Herman; Alternate: Marlena Dziewirz	Fourth: Sara Al-Qaet; Skip: Amna Al-Qaet; Second: Hend Metwalli; Lead: Nour Metwalli; Alternate: Rawan Alamrsry	Skip: Fay Henderson; Third: Robyn Munro; Second: Holly Wilkie-Milne; Lead: Laura Watt; Alternate: Amy Mitchell
Slovakia	Slovenia	South Korea	Spain	Turkey	Ukraine
Skip: Nina Summernova; Third: Melánia Kováčiková; Second: Paulina Hajduk; Lead: Zora Reilly	Skip: Ajda Zaveljcina; Third: Lea Žemlja; Second: Maja Kučina; Lead: Ema Kavčič; Alternate: Pavla Kavčič	Skip: Kang Bo-bae; Third: Jo Ju-hee; Second: Kim Na-yeon; Lead: Lee You-sun; Alternate: Cheon Hee-seo	Skip: Carmen Pérez; Third: María Gómez; Second: Daniela García; Lead: Nerea Torralba; Alternate: Leire Carasa Lazaro	Fourth: Berfin Şengül; Third: Nilay Arzik; Second: İclal Karaman; Skip: İlknur Ürüşan; Alternate: Nisanur Kaya	Skip: Polina Putintseva; Third: Yaroslava Kalinichenko; Second: Anastasiia Kotova; Lead: Diana Mosalenko

=== Round-robin standings ===
Final round-robin standings

Key
Teams to Playoffs

Group A	Skip	W	L	W–L	DSC
Canada	Emily Deschenes	5	0	–	53.22
Turkey	İlknur Ürüşan	4	1	–	73.96
Italy	Marta Lo Deserto	3	2	–	96.93
Poland	Monika Wosińska	2	3	–	92.92
Slovakia	Nina Summerova	1	4	–	127.41
Brazil	Gabriela Rogic Farias	0	5	–	111.37

Group B	Skip	W	L	W–L	DSC
South Korea	Kang Bo-bae	5	0	–	65.16
Czech Republic	Kristyna Farkova	3	2	1–1	74.82
Kazakhstan	Angelina Ebauyer	3	2	1–1	93.97
Netherlands	Lisenka Bomas	3	2	1–1	113.57
Finland	Ella Eivola	1	4	–	153.88
Nigeria	Gift Uchegbua	0	5	–	191.34

Group C	Skip	W	L	W–L	DSC
Denmark	Karolina Jensen	5	0	–	87.30
China	Zhang Jiaqi	4	1	–	105.62
Spain	Carmen Pérez	3	2	–	89.81
England	Mia Andell	2	3	–	147.82
Slovenia	Ajda Zaveljcina	1	4	–	113.92
Qatar	Amna Al-Qaet	0	5	–	169.51

Group D	Skip	W	L	W–L	DSC
Scotland	Fay Henderson	5	0	–	114.58
Hungary	Linda Joó	4	1	–	85.37
Ukraine	Polina Putintseva	3	2	–	111.78
New Zealand	Grace Apuwai-Bishop	2	3	–	90.49
Austria	Astrid Pfluegler	1	4	–	87.54
Mongolia	Enkhzaya Ganbat	0	5	–	159.57

Group A Round Robin Summary Table
Pos.	Country	Brazil	Canada	Italy	Poland	Slovakia	Turkey	Record
6	Brazil	—	3–8	4–10	2–14	3–8	3–9	0–5
1	Canada	8–3	—	11–1	8–6	5–2	5–4	5–0
3	Italy	10–4	1–11	—	5–3	8–2	5–6	3–2
4	Poland	14–2	6–8	3–5	—	6–3	5–9	2–3
5	Slovakia	8–3	2–5	2–8	3–6	—	2–12	1–4
2	Turkey	9–3	4–5	6–5	9–5	12–2	—	4–1

Group B Round Robin Summary Table
Pos.	Country	Czech Republic	Finland	Kazakhstan	Netherlands	Nigeria	South Korea	Record
2	Czech Republic	—	19–1	4–5	7–2	20–1	3–6	3–2
5	Finland	1–19	—	4–11	3–12	12–2	1–14	1–4
3	Kazakhstan	5–4	11–4	—	3–6	14–0	2–11	3–2
4	Netherlands	2–7	12–3	6–3	—	24–0	3–12	3–2
6	Nigeria	1–20	2–12	0–14	0–24	—	1–18	0–5
1	South Korea	6–3	14–1	11–2	12–3	18–1	—	5–0

Group C Round Robin Summary Table
Pos.	Country	China	Denmark	England	Qatar	Slovenia	Spain	Record
2	China	—	4–7	7–4	15–3	9–5	11–1	4–1
1	Denmark	7–4	—	8–6	20–2	11–4	7–4	5–0
4	England	4–7	6–8	—	6–4	6–5	2–10	2–3
6	Qatar	3–15	2–20	4–6	—	2–12	0–15	0–5
5	Slovenia	5–9	4–11	5–6	12–2	—	4–7	1–4
3	Spain	1–11	4–7	10–2	15–0	7–4	—	3–2

Group D Round Robin Summary Table
Pos.	Country	Austria	Hungary	Mongolia	New Zealand	Scotland	Ukraine	Record
5	Austria	—	4–9	14–1	3–6	4–7	3–8	1–4
2	Hungary	9–4	—	11–2	7–4	3–5	8–3	4–1
6	Mongolia	1–14	2–11	—	1–11	1–11	0–20	0–5
4	New Zealand	6–3	4–7	11–1	—	3–6	6–7	2–3
1	Scotland	7–4	5–3	11–1	6–3	—	11–3	5–0
3	Ukraine	8–3	3–8	20–0	7–6	3–11	—	3–2

=== Round-robin results ===
All draw times are listed in Eastern European Summer Time (UTC+03:00).

==== Draw 1 ====
Thursday, December 15, 9:00

Sheet A	1	2	3	4	5	6	7	8	Final
China (Zhang) 🔨	1	1	0	1	1	0	0	X	4
Denmark (Jensen)	0	0	1	0	0	2	4	X	7

Sheet C	1	2	3	4	5	6	7	8	Final
Italy (Lo Deserto)	0	0	0	0	1	0	X	X	1
Canada (Deschenes) 🔨	0	4	5	1	0	1	X	X	11

Sheet E	1	2	3	4	5	6	7	8	Final
Poland (Wosińska) 🔨	3	2	3	0	6	0	X	X	14
Brazil (Rogic Farias)	0	0	0	1	0	1	X	X	2

Sheet B	1	2	3	4	5	6	7	8	Final
England (Andell) 🔨	1	0	1	0	0	0	0	X	2
Spain (Pérez)	0	1	0	3	1	3	2	X	10

Sheet D	1	2	3	4	5	6	7	8	Final
Qatar (Al-Qaet)	1	0	0	0	0	1	X	X	2
Slovenia (Zaveljcina) 🔨	0	3	2	5	2	0	X	X	12

Sheet F	1	2	3	4	5	6	7	8	Final
Turkey (Ürüşan) 🔨	2	2	0	3	1	0	4	X	12
Slovakia (Summernova)	0	0	1	0	0	1	0	X	2

==== Draw 2 ====
Thursday, December 15, 14:00

Sheet A	1	2	3	4	5	6	7	8	Final
Mongolia (Ganbat)	0	0	1	1	0	0	0	X	4
Hungary (Joó) 🔨	3	2	0	0	4	1	1	X	11

Sheet C	1	2	3	4	5	6	7	8	Final
Netherlands (Bomas) 🔨	4	3	3	4	6	4	X	X	24
Nigeria (Uchegbua)	0	0	0	0	0	0	X	X	0

Sheet E	1	2	3	4	5	6	7	8	Final
Czech Republic (Farková) 🔨	1	0	1	0	0	0	1	X	3
South Korea (Kang)	0	2	0	1	2	1	0	X	6

Sheet B	1	2	3	4	5	6	7	8	Final
Scotland (Henderson)	0	3	2	0	0	6	X	X	11
Ukraine (Putinsteva) 🔨	2	0	0	1	0	0	X	X	3

Sheet D	1	2	3	4	5	6	7	8	Final
Austria (Pflueger)	0	0	1	1	0	1	0	X	3
New Zealand (Apuawi-Bishop) 🔨	1	1	0	0	2	0	2	X	6

Sheet F	1	2	3	4	5	6	7	8	Final
Kazakhstan (Ebauyer) 🔨	2	0	0	6	0	3	X	X	11
Finland (Eilova)	0	1	2	0	1	0	X	X	4

==== Draw 3 ====
Thursday, December 15, 19:00

Sheet A	1	2	3	4	5	6	7	8	Final
Slovenia (Zaveljcina)	0	1	0	0	3	0	1	0	5
England (Andell) 🔨	1	0	1	1	0	2	0	1	6

Sheet C	1	2	3	4	5	6	7	8	Final
Spain (Pérez) 🔨	0	0	0	0	1	0	X	X	1
China (Zhang)	2	3	2	2	0	2	X	X	11

Sheet E	1	2	3	4	5	6	7	8	Final
Denmark (Jensen) 🔨	1	4	7	0	2	6	X	X	20
Qatar (Al-Qaet)	0	0	0	2	0	0	X	X	2

Sheet B	1	2	3	4	5	6	7	8	9	Final
Italy (Lo Deserto) 🔨	2	1	0	0	0	0	1	1	0	5
Turkey (Ürüşan)	0	0	3	0	1	1	0	0	1	6

Sheet D	1	2	3	4	5	6	7	8	Final
Slovakia (Summernova)	0	0	0	0	1	0	2	X	3
Poland (Wosińska) 🔨	2	1	0	1	0	2	0	X	6

Sheet F	1	2	3	4	5	6	7	8	Final
Brazil (Rogic Farias)	0	0	1	0	0	2	0	X	3
Canada (Desenches) 🔨	1	2	0	1	1	0	3	X	8

==== Draw 4 ====
Friday, December 16, 9:00

Sheet A	1	2	3	4	5	6	7	8	Final
New Zealand (Apuwai-Bishop)	1	0	1	0	1	0	0	X	3
Scotland (Henderson) 🔨	0	2	0	4	0	0	0	X	6

Sheet C	1	2	3	4	5	6	7	8	Final
Ukraine (Putinsteva) 🔨	2	5	2	4	4	3	X	X	20
Mongolia (Ganbat)	0	0	0	0	0	0	X	X	0

Sheet E	1	2	3	4	5	6	7	8	Final
Hungary (Joó)	0	3	3	1	2	0	0	X	9
Austria (Pfluegler) 🔨	2	0	0	0	0	1	1	X	4

Sheet B	1	2	3	4	5	6	7	8	Final
Netherlands (Bomas)	1	1	0	0	1	2	0	1	6
Kazakhstan (Ebauyer) 🔨	0	0	1	0	0	0	2	0	3

Sheet D	1	2	3	4	5	6	7	8	Final
Finland (Eivola) 🔨	1	0	0	0	0	0	X	X	1
Czech Republic (Farková)	0	3	3	6	2	5	X	X	19

Sheet F	1	2	3	4	5	6	7	8	Final
South Korea (Kang) 🔨	1	3	0	3	4	3	4	X	18
Nigeria (Uchegbua)	0	0	1	0	0	0	0	X	1

==== Draw 5 ====
Friday, December 16, 14:00

Sheet A	1	2	3	4	5	6	7	8	Final
Qatar (Al-Qaet) 🔨	0	0	0	0	0	0	X	X	0
Spain (Pérez)	4	4	1	3	1	2	X	X	15

Sheet C	1	2	3	4	5	6	7	8	Final
Slovenia (Zaveljcina)	0	2	0	1	1	0	X	X	4
Denmark (Jensen) 🔨	1	0	6	0	0	4	X	X	11

Sheet E	1	2	3	4	5	6	7	8	Final
Canada (Deschenes) 🔨	1	1	0	2	0	0	1	0	5
Turkey (Ürüşan)	0	0	1	0	1	1	0	1	4

Sheet B	1	2	3	4	5	6	7	8	Final
Slovakia (Summernova) 🔨	2	2	0	4	0	0	0	X	8
Brazil (Rogic Farias)	0	0	1	0	0	1	1	X	3

Sheet D	1	2	3	4	5	6	7	8	Final
England (Andell)	0	0	2	0	0	1	1	X	4
China (Zhang) 🔨	1	1	0	2	3	0	0	X	7

Sheet F	1	2	3	4	5	6	7	8	Final
Poland (Wosińska) 🔨	0	0	1	0	0	1	1	0	3
Italy (Lo Deserto)	1	0	0	1	0	0	0	3	5

==== Draw 6 ====
Friday, December 16, 19:00

Sheet A	1	2	3	4	5	6	7	8	Final
Austria (Pfluegler) 🔨	0	0	0	2	1	0	0	X	3
Ukraine (Putintseva)	1	2	2	0	0	1	2	X	8

Sheet C	1	2	3	4	5	6	7	8	Final
New Zealand (Apuwai-Bishop)	0	2	1	0	0	1	0	X	4
Hungary (Joó) 🔨	1	0	0	3	1	0	2	X	7

Sheet E	1	2	3	4	5	6	7	8	Final
Nigeria (Uchegbua)	0	0	0	0	0	0	0	X	0
Kazakhstan (Ebauyer) 🔨	3	1	1	1	1	2	5	X	14

Sheet B	1	2	3	4	5	6	7	8	Final
Finland (Eivola)	0	0	0	0	1	0	X	X	1
South Korea (Kang) 🔨	2	5	2	1	0	4	X	X	14

Sheet D	1	2	3	4	5	6	7	8	Final
Scotland (Henderson) 🔨	3	1	2	1	1	0	3	X	11
Mongolia (Ganbat)	0	0	0	0	0	1	0	X	1

Sheet F	1	2	3	4	5	6	7	8	Final
Czech Republic (Farková) 🔨	3	0	0	1	1	1	1	X	7
Netherlands (Bomas)	0	2	0	0	0	0	0	X	2

==== Draw 7 ====
Saturday, December 17, 9:00

Sheet A	1	2	3	4	5	6	7	8	Final
Slovakia (Summernova)	0	0	1	0	1	0	0	X	2
Canada (Desenches) 🔨	2	0	0	0	0	1	2	X	5

Sheet C	1	2	3	4	5	6	7	8	Final
Poland (Wosińska)	0	3	0	1	1	0	X	X	5
Turkey (Ürüşan) 🔨	2	0	3	0	0	4	X	X	9

Sheet E	1	2	3	4	5	6	7	8	Final
Slovenia (Zaveljcina)	1	2	0	0	0	1	0	X	4
Spain (Pérez) 🔨	0	0	2	1	2	0	2	X	7

Sheet B	1	2	3	4	5	6	7	8	Final
China (Zhang) 🔨	0	5	4	4	2	0	X	X	15
Qatar (Al-Qaet)	2	0	0	0	0	1	X	X	3

Sheet D	1	2	3	4	5	6	7	8	Final
Brazil (Rogic Farias)	0	0	0	1	0	2	1	X	4
Italy (Lo Deserto) 🔨	4	1	2	0	3	0	0	X	10

Sheet F	1	2	3	4	5	6	7	8	Final
Denmark (Jensen) 🔨	2	0	0	1	0	4	0	1	8
England (Andell)	0	1	2	0	2	0	1	0	6

==== Draw 8 ====
Saturday, December 17, 14:00

Sheet A	1	2	3	4	5	6	7	8	Final
Finland (Eivola) 🔨	0	2	4	4	1	0	1	X	12
Nigeria (Uchegbua)	1	0	0	0	0	1	0	X	2

Sheet C	1	2	3	4	5	6	7	8	Final
Czech Republic (Farková) 🔨	0	2	1	1	0	0	0	0	4
Kazakhstan (Ebauyer)	1	0	0	0	1	1	1	1	5

Sheet E	1	2	3	4	5	6	7	8	Final
New Zealand (Apuwai-Bishop) 🔨	2	1	0	1	0	1	1	0	6
Ukraine (Putintseva)	0	0	1	0	5	0	0	1	7

Sheet B	1	2	3	4	5	6	7	8	Final
Mongolia (Ganbat) 🔨	0	0	0	0	1	0	X	X	1
Austria (Pfluegler)	4	4	1	1	0	4	X	X	14

Sheet D	1	2	3	4	5	6	7	8	Final
South Korea (Kang) 🔨	3	0	1	0	3	1	4	X	12
Netherlands (Bomas)	0	1	0	2	0	0	0	X	3

Sheet F	1	2	3	4	5	6	7	8	Final
Hungary (Joó) 🔨	0	1	1	0	1	0	0	X	3
Scotland (Henderson)	1	0	0	1	0	2	1	X	5

==== Draw 9 ====
Saturday, December 17, 19:00

Sheet A	1	2	3	4	5	6	7	8	Final
Turkey (Ürüşan) 🔨	3	3	0	2	0	1	X	X	9
Brazil (Rogic Farias)	0	0	1	0	2	0	X	X	3

Sheet C	1	2	3	4	5	6	7	8	Final
England (Andell)	1	0	3	0	1	1	0	X	6
Qatar (Al-Qaet) 🔨	0	1	0	1	0	0	2	X	4

Sheet E	1	2	3	4	5	6	7	8	Final
Italy (Lo Deserto)	0	1	0	3	1	2	1	X	8
Slovakia (Summerova) 🔨	1	0	1	0	0	0	0	X	2

Sheet B	1	2	3	4	5	6	7	8	Final
Canada (Deschenes) 🔨	0	0	2	2	0	3	0	1	8
Poland (Wosińska)	1	1	0	0	3	0	1	0	6

Sheet D	1	2	3	4	5	6	7	8	Final
Spain (Pérez) 🔨	1	0	1	0	0	2	0	0	4
Denmark (Jensen)	0	2	0	1	1	0	2	1	7

Sheet F	1	2	3	4	5	6	7	8	Final
China (Zhang)	1	0	3	1	0	1	0	3	9
Slovenia (Zaveljcina) 🔨	0	2	0	0	1	0	2	0	5

==== Draw 10 ====
Sunday, December 18, 9:00

Sheet A	1	2	3	4	5	6	7	8	Final
Kazakhstan (Ebauyer)	0	1	0	0	0	1	X	X	2
South Korea (Kang) 🔨	2	0	6	1	2	0	X	X	11

Sheet C	1	2	3	4	5	6	7	8	Final
Scotland (Henderson)	0	2	0	1	1	0	0	3	7
Austria (Pfluegler) 🔨	0	0	2	0	0	2	0	0	4

Sheet E	1	2	3	4	5	6	7	8	Final
Netherlands (Bomas) 🔨	4	0	4	2	2	0	X	X	12
Finland (Eivola)	0	1	0	0	0	2	X	X	3

Sheet B	1	2	3	4	5	6	7	8	Final
Nigeria (Uchegbua)	0	0	0	0	0	1	0	X	1
Czech Republic (Farková) 🔨	0	6	3	1	5	0	5	X	20

Sheet D	1	2	3	4	5	6	7	8	Final
Ukraine (Putintseva) 🔨	1	0	0	0	1	1	0	X	3
Hungary (Joó)	0	3	2	1	0	0	2	X	8

Sheet F	1	2	3	4	5	6	7	8	Final
Mongolia (Ganbat)	0	1	0	0	0	0	X	X	1
New Zealand (Apuwai-Bishop) 🔨	1	0	4	1	3	2	X	X	11

=== Playoffs ===
Quarterfinals
A1	Canada	8
D2	Hungary	6
B1	South Korea	6
C2	China	4
C1	Denmark	6
A2	Turkey	8
D1	Scotland	7
B2	Czech Republic	5

Semifinals
A1	Canada	6
B1	South Korea	4
A2	Turkey	2
D1	Scotland	7

Gold medal game
A1	Canada	5
D1	Scotland	4
Third place
B1	South Korea	11
A2	Turkey	10

==== Quarterfinals ====
Sunday, December 18, 17:00

Sheet A	1	2	3	4	5	6	7	8	Final
Scotland (Henderson) 🔨	1	0	0	2	3	0	1	0	7
Czech Republic (Farkova)	0	0	2	0	0	1	0	2	5

Sheet B	1	2	3	4	5	6	7	8	Final
South Korea (Kang) 🔨	0	1	0	2	0	0	0	3	6
China (Zhang)	2	0	0	0	0	1	1	0	4

Sheet E	1	2	3	4	5	6	7	8	Final
Denmark (Jensen)	0	1	1	1	0	0	3	0	6
Turkey (Ürüşan) 🔨	1	0	0	0	2	3	0	2	8

Sheet F	1	2	3	4	5	6	7	8	Final
Canada (Deschenes) 🔨	2	0	2	0	0	0	4	X	8
Hungary (Joó)	0	1	0	2	1	2	0	X	6

==== Semifinals ====
Monday, December 19, 9:00

Sheet B	1	2	3	4	5	6	7	8	Final
Turkey (Ürüşan) 🔨	0	1	0	0	0	1	0	X	2
Scotland (Henderson)	0	0	1	1	2	0	3	X	7

Sheet E	1	2	3	4	5	6	7	8	Final
Canada (Deschenes)	1	0	0	4	0	0	1	0	6
South Korea (Kang) 🔨	0	0	1	0	1	1	0	1	4

==== Bronze medal game ====
Monday, December 19, 14:00

Sheet D	1	2	3	4	5	6	7	8	Final
South Korea (Kang) 🔨	3	0	4	0	3	0	0	1	11
Turkey (Ürüşan)	0	3	0	4	0	1	2	0	10

==== Gold medal game ====
Monday, December 19, 14:00

Sheet C	1	2	3	4	5	6	7	8	Final
Canada (Deschenes) 🔨	1	2	0	0	0	2	0	0	5
Scotland (Henderson)	0	0	1	0	1	0	1	1	4

=== Final standings ===
Key
Teams Advance to the 2023 World Junior Curling Championships

Place	Team
1st place, gold medalist(s)	Canada
2nd place, silver medalist(s)	Scotland
3rd place, bronze medalist(s)	South Korea
4	Turkey
5	China
5	Czech Republic
5	Denmark
5	Hungary
9	Spain
10	Kazakhstan
11	Italy
12	Ukraine
13	New Zealand
14	Poland
15	Netherlands
16	England
17	Austria
18	Slovenia
19	Slovakia
20	Finland
21	Brazil
22	Mongolia
23	Qatar
24	Nigeria
