= 2022 Nova Scotia Scotties Tournament of Hearts =

- Host city: Berwick, Nova Scotia
- Arena: Berwick Curling Club
- Dates: December 8–11, 2021
- Winner: Team Black
- Curling club: Dartmouth CC, Dartmouth
- Skip: Christina Black
- Third: Jenn Baxter
- Second: Karlee Jones
- Lead: Shelley Barker
- Coach: Stuart MacLean
- Finalist: Jill Brothers

The 2022 Nova Scotia Scotties Tournament of Hearts, the provincial women's curling championship for Nova Scotia, was held from December 8 to 11, 2021 at the Berwick Curling Club in Berwick, Nova Scotia. The winning Christina Black team represented Nova Scotia at the 2022 Scotties Tournament of Hearts in Thunder Bay, Ontario.

Unlike previous seasons, there was no preliminary round to qualify eight teams for the provincial championship. Any team was able to register to compete in the championship.

== Teams ==
The teams are listed as follows:

Skip	Third	Second	Lead	Alternate	Club
Kelly Backman	Stephanie Guzzwell	Liz Woodworth	Julia Colter	Kristen MacDiarmid	Halifax CC, Halifax
Christina Black	Jenn Baxter	Karlee Jones	Shelley Barker		Dartmouth CC, Dartmouth
Jill Brothers	Erin Carmody	Sarah Murphy	Jenn Mitchell	Kim Kelly	Halifax CC, Halifax
Jennifer Crouse	Kate Callaghan	Sheena Moore	Kaitlin Fralic	Marin Callaghan	Halifax CC, Halifax
Jessica Daigle	Kristin Clarke	Lindsey Burgess	Emma Logan	Colleen Jones	Halifax CC, Halifax
Liz Garnett	Mary Myketyn-Driscoll	Julie McEvoy	Kaitlyn Veitch	Mary Day	Halifax CC, Halifax
Tanya Hilliard	Taylor Clarke	Mackenzie Feindel	Heather MacPhee	Allyson Burgess	Dartmouth CC, Dartmouth
Mary Mattatall	Marg Cutcliffe	Jill Alcoe-Holland	Andrea Saulnier		Lakeshore CC, Lower Sackville
Marlee Powers	Sarah Mallais	Jocelyn Adams	Amanda Simpson	Emily Dwyer	Halifax CC, Halifax
Taylour Stevens	Lauren Ferguson	Alison Umlah	Cate Fitzgerald	Maria Fitzgerald	Halifax CC, Halifax

== Knockout brackets ==
=== A event ===
First Knockout	Qualifier 1
Marlee Powers	6
Tanya Hilliard	5
Marlee Powers	3
Jill Brothers	8
Jill Brothers	5
Mary Mattatall	5	Jennifer Crouse	4
Jennifer Crouse	8	Jill Brothers	5
Christina Black	6
Jessica Daigle	3
Kelly Backman	8
Kelly Backman	7
Christina Black	8
Christina Black	9
Taylour Stevens	8	Taylour Stevens	7
Liz Garnett	5

=== B event ===
Second Knockout	Qualifier 2
Christina Black	7
Taylour Stevens	2
Marlee Powers	5
Taylour Stevens	6
Taylour Stevens	10
Mary Mattatall	5	Mary Mattatall	5
Jessica Daigle	3	Christina Black	6
Jill Brothers	5
Jill Brothers	6
Jennifer Crouse	4
Kelly Backman	8
Jennifer Crouse	9
Jennifer Crouse	8
Liz Garnett	7	Liz Garnett	3
Tanya Hilliard	3

=== C event ===
Third Knockout	Qualifier 3
Christina Black	8
Jessica Daigle	6
Jennifer Crouse	4
Jessica Daigle	9
Marlee Powers	5
Jessica Daigle	8	Jessica Daigle	8
Liz Garnett	6	Christina Black	8
Jill Brothers	6
Jill Brothers	6
Taylour Stevens	5
Taylour Stevens	9
Tanya Hilliard	1
Kelly Backman	7
Tanya Hilliard	8	Tanya Hilliard	8
Mary Mattatall	5

== Knockout results ==
All draw times listed in Atlantic Time (UTC−04:00).

=== Draw 1 ===
Wednesday, December 8, 2:00 pm

Sheet 1	1	2	3	4	5	6	7	8	9	10	Final
Mary Mattatall 🔨	1	0	0	0	2	1	0	1	0	0	5
Jennifer Crouse	0	0	1	3	0	0	1	0	2	1	8

Sheet 2	1	2	3	4	5	6	7	8	9	10	Final
Taylour Stevens 🔨	1	1	0	0	0	0	2	0	2	2	8
Liz Garnett	0	0	3	1	0	0	0	1	0	0	5

Sheet 3	1	2	3	4	5	6	7	8	9	10	11	Final
Marlee Powers 🔨	0	0	1	0	2	0	1	0	0	1	1	6
Tanya Hilliard	1	0	0	1	0	1	0	1	1	0	0	5

Sheet 4	1	2	3	4	5	6	7	8	9	10	Final
Jessica Daigle 🔨	0	0	0	0	0	1	0	2	0	X	3
Kelly Backman	0	1	0	3	1	0	1	0	2	X	8

=== Draw 2 ===
Wednesday, December 8, 7:30 pm

Sheet 1	1	2	3	4	5	6	7	8	9	10	Final
Liz Garnett 🔨	2	0	0	2	1	0	1	1	0	X	7
Tanya Hilliard	0	0	1	0	0	1	0	0	1	X	3

Sheet 2	1	2	3	4	5	6	7	8	9	10	Final
Mary Mattatall	1	0	2	0	1	0	0	0	0	1	5
Jessica Daigle 🔨	0	1	0	1	0	0	0	0	1	0	3

Sheet 3	1	2	3	4	5	6	7	8	9	10	Final
Jill Brothers 🔨	0	1	0	0	1	0	1	0	1	1	5
Jennifer Crouse	0	0	2	0	0	1	0	1	0	0	4

Sheet 4	1	2	3	4	5	6	7	8	9	10	Final
Christina Black	0	2	0	4	0	1	0	0	1	1	9
Taylour Stevens 🔨	1	0	2	0	0	0	3	1	0	0	7

=== Draw 3 ===
Thursday, December 9, 9:00 am

Sheet 1	1	2	3	4	5	6	7	8	9	10	Final
Taylour Stevens	0	0	3	0	4	0	1	0	2	X	10
Mary Mattatall 🔨	0	1	0	1	0	1	0	2	0	X	5

Sheet 2	1	2	3	4	5	6	7	8	9	10	Final
Jennifer Crouse 🔨	2	0	0	2	0	0	1	2	1	X	8
Liz Garnett	0	0	1	0	2	0	0	0	0	X	3

Sheet 3	1	2	3	4	5	6	7	8	9	10	11	Final
Kelly Backman	0	2	0	2	0	0	0	2	1	0	0	7
Christina Black 🔨	1	0	1	0	1	2	0	0	0	2	1	8

Sheet 4	1	2	3	4	5	6	7	8	9	10	Final
Marlee Powers 🔨	0	0	0	0	1	0	0	2	0	X	3
Jill Brothers	0	0	2	2	0	2	0	0	2	X	8

=== Draw 4 ===
Thursday, December 9, 2:00 pm

Sheet 2	1	2	3	4	5	6	7	8	9	10	11	Final
Jill Brothers 🔨	2	0	0	1	0	0	0	1	0	1	0	5
Christina Black	0	1	1	0	2	0	0	0	1	0	1	6

Sheet 3	1	2	3	4	5	6	7	8	9	10	Final
Marlee Powers	2	0	1	0	0	0	0	1	1	0	5
Taylour Stevens 🔨	0	1	0	2	0	0	1	0	0	2	6

Sheet 4	1	2	3	4	5	6	7	8	9	10	Final
Kelly Backman	0	2	0	0	1	0	2	0	3	0	8
Jennifer Crouse 🔨	2	0	1	1	0	2	0	2	0	1	9

=== Draw 5 ===
Thursday, December 9, 7:00 pm

Sheet 1	1	2	3	4	5	6	7	8	9	10	Final
Jessica Daigle	1	0	2	1	0	1	0	2	0	1	8
Liz Garnett 🔨	0	0	0	0	2	0	3	0	1	0	6

Sheet 2	1	2	3	4	5	6	7	8	9	10	Final
Tanya Hilliard 🔨	1	2	1	1	0	2	0	0	1	X	8
Mary Mattatall	0	0	0	0	1	0	3	1	0	X	5

=== Draw 6 ===
Friday, December 10, 2:00 pm

Sheet 1	1	2	3	4	5	6	7	8	9	10	Final
Jill Brothers 🔨	0	2	0	0	1	1	0	2	0	X	6
Jennifer Crouse	0	0	0	1	0	0	2	0	1	X	4

Sheet 2	1	2	3	4	5	6	7	8	9	10	Final
Marlee Powers	0	0	0	3	1	0	1	0	0	0	5
Jessica Daigle 🔨	2	0	0	0	0	2	0	1	1	2	8

Sheet 3	1	2	3	4	5	6	7	8	9	10	Final
Kelly Backman 🔨	1	0	1	0	0	0	3	0	1	1	7
Tanya Hilliard	0	1	0	2	2	1	0	2	0	0	8

Sheet 4	1	2	3	4	5	6	7	8	9	10	Final
Christina Black	0	1	1	0	1	1	1	0	2	X	7
Taylour Stevens 🔨	0	0	0	1	0	0	0	1	0	X	2

=== Draw 7 ===
Friday, December 10, 7:00 pm

Sheet 1	1	2	3	4	5	6	7	8	9	10	Final
Taylour Stevens	0	0	2	0	2	2	3	X	X	X	9
Tanya Hilliard 🔨	0	0	0	1	0	0	0	X	X	X	1

Sheet 2	1	2	3	4	5	6	7	8	9	10	Final
Christina Black 🔨	1	0	1	0	2	0	0	1	0	1	6
Jill Brothers	0	1	0	1	0	1	1	0	1	0	5

Sheet 3	1	2	3	4	5	6	7	8	9	10	Final
Jennifer Crouse 🔨	0	0	0	0	0	0	0	4	0	X	4
Jessica Daigle	0	0	2	1	0	1	1	0	4	X	9

=== Draw 8 ===
Saturday, December 11, 10:00 am

Sheet 3	1	2	3	4	5	6	7	8	9	10	Final
Jill Brothers	0	0	0	2	0	1	2	0	0	1	6
Taylour Stevens 🔨	0	2	0	0	1	0	0	1	1	0	5

Sheet 4	1	2	3	4	5	6	7	8	9	10	Final
Christina Black	1	0	0	4	1	0	1	0	1	X	8
Jessica Daigle 🔨	0	3	1	0	0	1	0	1	0	X	6

=== Draw 9 ===
Saturday, December 11, 3:00 pm

Sheet 2	1	2	3	4	5	6	7	8	9	10	Final
Christina Black 🔨	1	0	1	2	1	0	1	0	1	1	8
Jill Brothers	0	3	0	0	0	2	0	1	0	0	6

2022 Nova Scotia Scotties Tournament of Hearts

Christina Black
4th Nova Scotia Provincial Championship title

== Playoffs ==
- No playoffs were required as the Christina Black rink won all three qualifying events.

Semifinal		Final
		A	Christina Black
B	Christina Black
C	Christina Black

=== Semifinal ===
Sunday, December 12, 10:00 am

Sheet 3	1	2	3	4	5	6	7	8	Final
Christina Black									0
Christina Black									0

=== Final ===
Sunday, December 12, 3:00 pm

Sheet 2	1	2	3	4	5	6	7	8	Final
Christina Black									0
									0
