= Cate Fitzgerald =

Canadian curler

- Curler
- Born: August 8, 2002 (age 24); Halifax, Nova Scotia

Team
- Curling club: Halifax CC, Halifax
- Skip: Taylour Stevens
- Third: Maria Fitzgerald
- Second: Alison Umlah
- Lead: Cate Fitzgerald

Curling career
- Member Association: Nova Scotia
- Hearts: 1 (2026)
Medal record
Women's curling
Representing Nova Scotia
Canada Games
Bronze medal – third place	2019 Red Deer

Catherine Fitzgerald (born August 8, 2002) is a Canadian curler from Halifax, Nova Scotia. She is a former Canadian junior champion.

== Career ==
=== Youth ===
Fitzgerald won the 2017 provincial Under 18 championship, playing lead for the Cally Moore rink. The team represented Nova Scotia at the 2017 Canadian U18 Curling Championships, where they lost in the bronze medal game. The team won the provincial Under 18-championship again in 2019, as well as the provincial Canada Games selection event. They went on to represent Nova Scotia at the 2019 Canada Winter Games, where they won the bronze medal. A few weeks later, they represented Nova Scotia at the 2019 Canadian U18 Curling Championships, where they finished with a 2–4 record.

Fitzgerald won the 2020 Nova Scotia Junior Women's Championship, throwing lead rocks for the Taylour Stevens rink. The team then went on to represent Nova Scotia at the 2020 Canadian Junior Curling Championships, where they posted an 8–2 record, before losing in the semifinal to Alberta, but taking home a bronze in the process.

With no Canadian Juniors held in 2021 due to the COVID-19 pandemic in Canada, a World Junior Qualification Event was held in its stead. There, the Stevens rink was invited to represent Nova Scotia, where they lost in the semifinal. Later that season, the team won the 2022 Nova Scotia Junior Women's Curling Championship. The rink represented Nova Scotia 1 at the 2022 Canadian Junior Curling Championships, going undefeated in 10 games en route to the gold medal, defeating Ontario's Emily Deschenes rink in the final. The following season, Deschenes replaced Stevens as skip, as Stevens was no longer junior eligible. The team had to play in the World Junior-B Curling Championships in order to earn Canada a spot at the 2023 World Junior Curling Championships. The team went 8–0 at the junior B event, qualifying Canada for the 2023 World Juniors. There, the team finished the round robin with a 2–7 record, relegating Canada to play in the Junior-B event again later that year.

As the Canadian Junior team, the team also played in the 2022 PointsBet Invitational, losing to Kaitlyn Lawes in the round of 16.

Fitzgerald played lead for Dalhousie University (skipped by Allyson MacNutt) for the 2023–24 and 2024–25 seasons. The team won bronze medals at the 2024 and 2025 U Sports/Curling Canada University Curling Championships, and won the 2025 Atlantic University Sport Curling Championships.

=== Women's ===
In women's play, Fitzgerald was the lead on the Taylour Stevens rink at the 2022 Nova Scotia Scotties Tournament of Hearts, the provincial women's championship. There, the rink went 4–3.

Fitzgerald played lead for the Mackenzie Mitchell rink at the 2024 Nova Scotia Scotties Tournament of Hearts. There, the team made it to the semifinals, where they lost to Christina Black. At the 2025 Nova Scotia championship, the team went one step further, losing to Black in the final.

In 2025, Fitzgerald joined back up with Taylour Stevens, as her lead. The rink won the 2026 provincial championship, earning the right to represent Nova Scotia at the 2026 Scotties Tournament of Hearts, Canada's national women's curling championship. There, the team finished pool play with a 6–2 record, qualifying the rink for the championship round. There, they were eliminated by their provincial rivals, Team Christina Black, who had pre-qualified for the Hearts. It was the first time two teams from Nova Scotia played each other in the playoffs at the Hearts.

== Personal life ==
Fitzgerald is currently a payroll and benefits administrator with Shannex. Her sister Maria is also a member of the Stevens rink. While at Dalhousie University, she took biology, originally seeking a bachelor of health science in respiratory therapy. In 2022, she received a Curling Canada For the Love of Curling Scholarship, presented by the Governor General's Curling Club. On March 19, 2024, she was named Atlantic University Sport female co-athlete of the week, along with teammate Lindsey Burgess, for being named as a First Team-All Canadian at the 2024 University Championships.
