= Maria Fitzgerald (curler) =

Canadian curler

- Curler
- Born: January 29, 2004 (age 22); Halifax, Nova Scotia

Team
- Curling club: Halifax CC, Halifax
- Skip: Taylour Stevens
- Third: Maria Fitzgerald
- Second: Alison Umlah
- Lead: Cate Fitzgerald

Curling career
- Member Association: Nova Scotia
- Hearts: 1 (2026)
Medal record
Women's curling
Representing Canada
World Junior Championships
Bronze medal – third place	2025 Cortina d'Ampezzo

Maria Fitzgerald (born January 29, 2004) is a Canadian curler from Halifax, Nova Scotia. She is a former Canadian junior champion and World junior bronze medallist.

== Career ==
=== Juniors ===
Fitzgerald made her national debut at the 2022 Canadian U18 Curling Championships, playing third for the Nova Scotia 1 rink, skipped by Marin Callaghan, after the team won the provincial Under 18 championship. At the Canadian U18 Championships, the team finished with a 5–1 record on the group stage, before being eliminated in the quarterfinals.

Two years later, Fitzgerald won the Nova Scotia Junior Women's Curling Championship, playing third for Allyson MacNutt. The team represented Nova Scotia 1 at the 2024 Canadian Junior Curling Championships, going undefeated in 10 games en route to the gold medal, defeating Ontario's Julia Markle rink in the final. The team then represented Canada at the 2025 World Junior Curling Championships. There, they squeaked into the playoffs with a 5–4 record. They then lost to Germany in the semifinal before beating Sweden in the bronze medal game.

As Canadian Junior champions, the team earned a berth in the 2024 PointsBet Invitational. There, the team upset Kerri Einarson in their first game, before being eliminated by Kate Cameron in the Elite 8.

=== Women's ===
In women's play, Fitzgerald was the alternate on the Taylour Stevens rink at the 2022 Nova Scotia Scotties Tournament of Hearts, the provincial women's championship. There, the rink went 4–3.

The MacNutt junior rink played in the 2024 Nova Scotia Scotties Tournament of Hearts as a warm-up for the Canadian Juniors that year. There, the team lost all three of their games. The team had more success at the 2025 Nova Scotia championship, where they lost in the semifinal.

In 2025, Fitzgerald joined back up with Taylour Stevens, this time playing third on her team. The rink won the 2026 provincial championship, earning the right to represent Nova Scotia at the 2026 Scotties Tournament of Hearts, Canada's national women's curling championship. There, the team finished pool play with a 6–2 record, qualifying the rink for the championship round. There, they were eliminated by their provincial rivals, Team Christina Black, who had pre-qualified for the Hearts. It was the first time two teams from Nova Scotia played each other in the playoffs at the Hearts.

== Personal life ==
Fitzgerald is currently a psychology student at St. Mary's University. Her sister Cate is also a member of the Stevens rink
