= Alison Umlah =

Canadian curler

- Curler
- Born: August 1, 2003 (age 23); Halifax, Nova Scotia

Team
- Curling club: Halifax CC, Halifax
- Skip: Taylour Stevens
- Third: Maria Fitzgerald
- Second: Alison Umlah
- Lead: Cate Fitzgerald

Curling career
- Member Association: Nova Scotia
- Hearts: 1 (2026)
Medal record
Women's curling
Representing Canada
World Junior Championships
Bronze medal – third place	2025 Cortina d'Ampezzo

Alison Umlah (born August 1, 2003) is a Canadian curler from Dartmouth, Nova Scotia. She is a two-time Canadian junior champion and World junior bronze medallist.

== Career ==
=== Juniors ===
Umlah won the 2020 Nova Scotia provincial Under 18 championship, playing lead for the Katelyn Nodding rink, however there was no national championship that year due to the COVID-19 pandemic in Canada.

With no Canadian Juniors held in 2021 due to the pandemic, a World Junior Qualification Event was held instead. There, the Taylour Stevens rink, with Umlah at second stone, was invited to represent Nova Scotia, where they lost in the semifinal. Later that season, the team won the Nova Scotia Junior Women's Curling Championship. The rink represented Nova Scotia 1 at the 2022 Canadian Junior Curling Championships, going undefeated in 10 games en route to the gold medal, defeating Ontario's Emily Deschenes rink in the final. The following season, Deschenes replaced Stevens as skip, as Stevens was no longer junior eligible. The team had to play in the World Junior-B Curling Championships in order to earn Canada a spot at the 2023 World Junior Curling Championships. The team went 8–0 at the junior B event, qualifying Canada for the 2023 World Juniors. There, the team finished the round robin with a 2–7 record, relegating Canada to play in the Junior-B event again later that year.

Two years later, Umlah won her second provincial junior championship, this time playing second for the Allyson MacNutt team. Representing Nova Scotia 1 at the 2024 Canadian Junior Curling Championships, the MacNutt rink also went undefeated in 10 games en route to the gold medal, defeating Ontario's Julia Markle rink in the final. Umlah is the only curler to play for 2 undefeated teams in the Canadian Junior Curling Championships. The MacNutt team then represented Canada at the 2025 World Junior Curling Championships. There, they squeaked into the playoffs with a 5–4 record. They then lost to Germany in the semifinal before beating Sweden in the bronze medal game.

As Canadian Junior champions, the team earned a berth in the 2024 PointsBet Invitational. There, the team upset Kerri Einarson in their first game, before being eliminated by Kate Cameron in the Elite 8.

=== Women's ===
In women's play, Umlah was the second on the Taylour Stevens rink at the 2022 Nova Scotia Scotties Tournament of Hearts, the provincial women's championship. There, the rink went 4–3.

The MacNutt junior rink played in the 2024 Nova Scotia Scotties Tournament of Hearts as a warm-up for the Canadian Juniors that year. There, the team lost all three of their games. The team had more success at the 2025 Nova Scotia championship, where they lost in the semifinal.

In 2025, Umlah joined back up with Taylour Stevens, again throwing second stones. The rink won the 2026 provincial championship, earning the right to represent Nova Scotia at the 2026 Scotties Tournament of Hearts, Canada's national women's curling championship. There, the team finished pool play with a 6–2 record, qualifying the rink for the championship round. There, they were eliminated by their provincial rivals, Team Christina Black, who had pre-qualified for the Hearts. It was the first time two teams from Nova Scotia played each other in the playoffs at the Hearts.

== Personal life ==
Umlah is currently a communications graduate at Mount Saint Vincent University, starting out in nutritional science. In 2023, she was one of the winners of the World Curling's Sports Media Trainee Programme, and went to the 2023 World Mixed Doubles Curling Championship to conduct journalistic and social media duties for the World Curling Media Team. She was also one of the Curling Canada For the Love of Curling Scholarship Recipients. In 2024, she was named a Nova Scotia True Sport athlete ambassador.
