= 2024 Canadian Junior Curling Championships =

2024 New Holland Canadian Junior Curling Championships
- Host city: Fort McMurray, Alberta
- Arena: Suncor Community Leisure Centre & Oilsands Curling Club
- Dates: March 24–31
- Men's winner: Alberta 1
- Curling club: The Glencoe Club, Calgary
- Skip: Kenan Wipf
- Third: Ky Macaulay
- Second: Michael Keenan
- Lead: Max Cinnamon
- Coach: Derek Bowyer
- Finalist: Nova Scotia 1 (MacIsaac)
- Women's winner: Nova Scotia 1
- Curling club: Halifax CC, Halifax
- Skip: Allyson MacNutt
- Third: Maria Fitzgerald
- Second: Alison Umlah
- Lead: Grace McCusker
- Coach: Theresa Breen
- Finalist: Ontario 1 (Markle)

The 2024 New Holland Canadian Under-21 Curling Championships were held from March 24 to 31 at the Suncor Community Leisure Centre and the Oilsands Curling Club in Fort McMurray, Alberta. The winners earned the right to represent Canada at the 2025 World Junior Curling Championships.

This was the second time Fort McMurray played host to the Canadian Under-21 Curling Championships. The city previously held the 2013 championship which was won by Manitoba's Matt Dunstone and British Columbia's Corryn Brown. Fort McMurray was also supposed to host the 2021 championship before it was cancelled due to the COVID-19 pandemic, being replaced by the 2021 World Junior Qualification Event.

The event featured eighteen teams on both the men's and women's sides, each split into two pools of nine. The top three teams from each pool at the end of the round robin advanced to the playoff round. Based on results from the 2022 and 2023 events, certain provinces earned two berths to the championship. British Columbia, Manitoba, Northern Ontario, Nova Scotia, Ontario and Saskatchewan each earned an extra berth on the men's side, while Manitoba, Newfoundland and Labrador, Northern Ontario, Nova Scotia and Ontario got two berths on the women's side The host province, Alberta, also earned two teams.

== Medallists ==
Junior	Gold	Silver	Bronze
Men	Alberta 1 Kenan Wipf; Ky Macaulay; Michael Keenan; Max Cinnamon	Nova Scotia 1 Calan MacIsaac; Nathan Gray; Owain Fisher; Christopher McCurdy	Manitoba 2 Jace Freeman; Ryan Ostrowsky; Nick Senff; Luke Robins
Women	Nova Scotia 1 Allyson MacNutt; Maria Fitzgerald; Alison Umlah; Grace McCusker	Ontario 1 Julia Markle; Evelyn Robert; Scotia Maltman; Sadie McCutcheon; Jenny Madden	Alberta 2 Claire Booth (Fourth); Keelie Duncan; Grace Beaudry (Skip); Carley Hardie; Kate Ector

== Men ==
=== Teams ===
The teams are listed as follows:

Province / Territory	Skip	Third	Second	Lead	Alternate	Club(s)
Alberta 1	Kenan Wipf	Ky Macaulay	Michael Keenan	Max Cinnamon		The Glencoe Club, Calgary
Alberta 2	Timothy Marin	Jaxon Hiebert	Evan Hennigar	Nate Burton	Zachary Davies	Sherwood Park CC, Sherwood Park
British Columbia 1	Adam Fenton	Thomas Reed	Chris Parkinson	Miles Reed		Royal City CC, New Westminster
British Columbia 2	Alex Duncan-Wu	Kaiden Beck	Nolan Beck	Harrison Hrynew		Royal City / Vernon / Salmon Arm
Manitoba 1	Jordon McDonald	Dallas Burgess	Elias Huminicki	Cameron Olafson		Assiniboine Memorial CC, Winnipeg
Manitoba 2	Jace Freeman	Ryan Ostrowsky	Nick Senff	Luke Robins		Virden CC, Virden
New Brunswick	Jamie Stewart	Samuel Goodine	Noah Riggs	John Siddall	Sahil Dalrymple	Fredericton / Gage
Newfoundland and Labrador	Parker Tipple	Spencer Tipple	Jack Kinsella	Liam Quinlan		St. John's CC, St. John's
Northern Ontario 1	Brendan Rajala (Fourth)	Jackson Dubinsky (Skip)	Jesse Crozier	Adam Wiersema		Northern Credit Union CC, Sudbury
Northern Ontario 2	Ian Deschene (Fourth)	Olivier Bonin-Ducharme	Brayden Sinclair	Connor Simms (Skip)		Northern Credit Union CC, Sudbury
Nova Scotia 1	Calan MacIsaac	Nathan Gray	Owain Fisher	Christopher McCurdy		Truro CC, Truro
Nova Scotia 2	Nick Mosher	Sean Beland	Owen McPherson	Aidan MacDonald		Halifax CC, Halifax
Ontario 1	Kibo Mulima	Kyle Stratton	Owen Henry	Matt Duizer	Noah Garner	Guelph CC, Guelph
Ontario 2	Tyler MacTavish	Evan Madore	Nathan Kim	Colsen Flemington	Evan MacDougall	KW Granite Club, Waterloo
Prince Edward Island	Jack MacFadyen	Keegan Warnell	Luke Butler	Anderson MacDougall		Summerside CC, Summerside
Quebec	Adam Bédard	Nathan Beaudoin Gendron	Gabriel Audette	Maël Chrétien		CC Noranda, Rouyn-Noranda
Saskatchewan 1	Matthew Drewitz	Michael Hom	Brayden Heistad	Jared Tessier		Nutana CC, Saskatoon
Saskatchewan 2	Dylan Derksen	Logan Sawicki	Tyler Derksen	Gavin Martens		Martensville CC, Martensville

=== Round robin standings ===
Final Round Robin Standings

Key
Teams to Playoffs

Pool A	Skip	W	L	W–L	DSC
Saskatchewan 2	Dylan Derksen	8	0	–	763.2
Manitoba 1	Jordon McDonald	7	1	–	401.6
Newfoundland and Labrador	Parker Tipple	5	3	–	1306.7
Nova Scotia 2	Nick Mosher	4	4	1–1	483.1
British Columbia 1	Adam Fenton	4	4	1–1	699.2
Saskatchewan 1	Matthew Drewitz	4	4	1–1	935.4
Ontario 2	Tyler MacTavish	2	6	1–0	541.0
New Brunswick	Jamie Stewart	2	6	0–1	1153.8
Quebec	Adam Bédard	0	8	–	1630.4

Pool B	Skip	W	L	W–L	DSC
Alberta 1	Kenan Wipf	7	1	–	726.8
Nova Scotia 1	Calan MacIsaac	6	2	1–0	584.8
Manitoba 2	Jace Freeman	6	2	0–1	705.9
Ontario 1	Kibo Mulima	4	4	1–0	426.7
Alberta 2	Timothy Marin	4	4	0–1	564.3
Northern Ontario 1	Jackson Dubinsky	3	5	2–0	566.3
Northern Ontario 2	Connor Simms	3	5	1–1	835.4
British Columbia 2	Alex Duncan-Wu	3	5	0–2	832.4
Prince Edward Island	Jack MacFadyen	0	8	–	892.7

=== Round robin results ===
All draw times are listed in Eastern Time (UTC−04:00).

==== Draw 1 ====
Sunday, March 24, 4:00 pm

Sheet A	1	2	3	4	5	6	7	8	9	10	Final
New Brunswick (Stewart)	2	0	1	0	0	2	0	0	0	0	5
Saskatchewan 2 (Derksen)	0	1	0	1	1	0	0	2	2	2	9

Sheet B	1	2	3	4	5	6	7	8	9	10	Final
Manitoba 1 (McDonald)	0	2	3	0	1	0	2	0	2	X	10
British Columbia 1 (Fenton)	1	0	0	1	0	2	0	1	0	X	5

Sheet C	1	2	3	4	5	6	7	8	9	10	Final
Newfoundland and Labrador (Tipple)	2	0	0	2	0	3	0	1	1	X	9
Ontario 2 (MacTavish)	0	0	1	0	2	0	1	0	0	X	4

Sheet D	1	2	3	4	5	6	7	8	9	10	Final
Saskatchewan 1 (Drewitz)	0	0	1	0	0	0	0	2	X	X	3
Nova Scotia 2 (Mosher)	2	0	0	1	2	4	2	0	X	X	11

Sheet E	1	2	3	4	5	6	7	8	9	10	11	Final
Nova Scotia 1 (MacIsaac)	0	0	0	1	0	2	1	0	1	1	0	6
Alberta 1 (Wipf)	0	2	0	0	3	0	0	1	0	0	1	7

Sheet F	1	2	3	4	5	6	7	8	9	10	Final
Northern Ontario 1 (Dubinsky)	0	0	1	0	0	0	2	0	0	X	3
Manitoba 2 (Freeman)	0	1	0	2	1	0	0	2	2	X	8

Sheet G	1	2	3	4	5	6	7	8	9	10	Final
Northern Ontario 2 (Simms)	2	0	2	0	0	1	0	0	0	3	8
British Columbia 2 (Duncan-Wu)	0	2	0	0	1	0	1	0	1	0	5

Sheet H	1	2	3	4	5	6	7	8	9	10	11	Final
Alberta 2 (Marin)	2	1	0	1	0	1	0	0	2	0	0	7
Ontario 1 (Mulima)	0	0	1	0	1	0	1	1	0	3	2	9

==== Draw 3 ====
Monday, March 25, 9:00 am

Sheet A	1	2	3	4	5	6	7	8	9	10	Final
Manitoba 1 (McDonald)	1	0	0	4	0	0	2	0	2	X	9
Saskatchewan 1 (Drewitz)	0	1	2	0	1	0	0	1	0	X	5

Sheet B	1	2	3	4	5	6	7	8	9	10	Final
Quebec (Bédard)	0	0	0	1	0	0	2	0	0	X	3
Newfoundland and Labrador (Tipple)	0	2	1	0	2	2	0	1	4	X	12

Sheet C	1	2	3	4	5	6	7	8	9	10	Final
Nova Scotia 2 (Mosher)	0	0	1	0	1	0	2	0	X	X	4
Saskatchewan 2 (Derksen)	0	1	0	4	0	4	0	1	X	X	10

Sheet D	1	2	3	4	5	6	7	8	9	10	Final
British Columbia 1 (Fenton)	0	0	0	0	1	0	4	0	1	3	9
Ontario 2 (MacTavish)	1	0	0	1	0	1	0	1	0	0	4

Sheet E	1	2	3	4	5	6	7	8	9	10	Final
Northern Ontario 1 (Dubinsky)	0	0	1	0	1	0	0	0	0	X	2
Alberta 2 (Marin)	2	1	0	1	0	0	0	1	3	X	8

Sheet F	1	2	3	4	5	6	7	8	9	10	Final
Prince Edward Island (MacFadyen)	2	0	1	0	0	1	0	1	1	0	6
Northern Ontario 2 (Simms)	0	0	0	2	1	0	2	0	0	2	7

Sheet G	1	2	3	4	5	6	7	8	9	10	Final
Ontario 1 (Mulima)	1	1	0	1	0	2	0	1	1	1	8
Alberta 1 (Wipf)	0	0	3	0	3	0	3	0	0	0	9

Sheet H	1	2	3	4	5	6	7	8	9	10	Final
Manitoba 2 (Freeman)	0	3	2	0	2	0	1	0	0	1	9
British Columbia 2 (Duncan-Wu)	0	0	0	2	0	3	0	0	1	0	6

==== Draw 5 ====
Monday, March 25, 7:00 pm

Sheet A	1	2	3	4	5	6	7	8	9	10	Final
Manitoba 2 (Freeman)	1	1	0	0	2	0	1	2	X	X	7
Ontario 1 (Mulima)	0	0	1	0	0	1	0	0	X	X	2

Sheet B	1	2	3	4	5	6	7	8	9	10	Final
Alberta 2 (Marin)	0	0	3	0	1	0	0	1	0	1	6
Nova Scotia 1 (MacIsaac)	0	1	0	1	0	0	1	0	2	0	5

Sheet C	1	2	3	4	5	6	7	8	9	10	Final
Prince Edward Island (MacFadyen)	0	1	1	0	0	2	0	0	2	0	6
Northern Ontario 1 (Dubinsky)	2	0	0	1	1	0	1	1	0	1	7

Sheet D	1	2	3	4	5	6	7	8	9	10	Final
Alberta 1 (Wipf)	0	2	0	0	2	0	1	0	1	1	7
Northern Ontario 2 (Simms)	1	0	1	0	0	2	0	2	0	0	6

Sheet E	1	2	3	4	5	6	7	8	9	10	Final
British Columbia 1 (Fenton)	2	1	0	1	0	0	0	2	0	2	8
Nova Scotia 2 (Mosher)	0	0	1	0	1	2	0	0	2	0	6

Sheet F	1	2	3	4	5	6	7	8	9	10	Final
Saskatchewan 1 (Drewitz)	0	1	1	0	0	2	2	2	3	X	11
New Brunswick (Stewart)	1	0	0	2	1	0	0	0	0	X	4

Sheet G	1	2	3	4	5	6	7	8	9	10	Final
Quebec (Bédard)	0	0	0	1	0	1	0	1	X	X	3
Manitoba 1 (McDonald)	3	3	2	0	3	0	1	0	X	X	12

Sheet H	1	2	3	4	5	6	7	8	9	10	Final
Saskatchewan 2 (Derksen)	0	0	0	4	1	0	0	2	0	X	7
Newfoundland and Labrador (Tipple)	1	0	1	0	0	1	0	0	2	X	5

==== Draw 7 ====
Tuesday, March 26, 2:00 pm

Sheet A	1	2	3	4	5	6	7	8	9	10	Final
Alberta 1 (Wipf)	0	3	1	3	0	0	1	0	X	X	8
Prince Edward Island (MacFadyen)	1	0	0	0	1	1	0	1	X	X	4

Sheet B	1	2	3	4	5	6	7	8	9	10	Final
Ontario 1 (Mulima)	0	2	0	0	2	1	0	0	1	0	6
British Columbia 2 (Duncan-Wu)	1	0	1	1	0	0	1	2	0	2	8

Sheet C	1	2	3	4	5	6	7	8	9	10	Final
Alberta 2 (Marin)	0	0	2	0	0	1	1	0	0	X	4
Manitoba 2 (Freeman)	0	2	0	1	1	0	0	2	4	X	10

Sheet D	1	2	3	4	5	6	7	8	9	10	Final
Northern Ontario 1 (Dubinsky)	0	1	0	0	0	2	1	0	1	X	5
Nova Scotia 1 (MacIsaac)	1	0	0	3	2	0	0	1	0	X	7

Sheet E	1	2	3	4	5	6	7	8	9	10	Final
Saskatchewan 2 (Derksen)	0	2	5	0	0	2	2	1	X	X	12
Quebec (Bédard)	0	0	0	2	1	0	0	0	X	X	3

Sheet F	1	2	3	4	5	6	7	8	9	10	Final
Nova Scotia 2 (Mosher)	2	0	2	0	3	1	0	2	0	1	11
Ontario 2 (MacTavish)	0	2	0	1	0	0	1	0	2	0	6

Sheet G	1	2	3	4	5	6	7	8	9	10	11	Final
Saskatchewan 1 (Drewitz)	0	1	2	0	0	3	1	0	1	2	1	11
British Columbia 1 (Fenton)	2	0	0	2	1	0	0	5	0	0	0	10

Sheet H	1	2	3	4	5	6	7	8	9	10	Final
Manitoba 1 (McDonald)	3	0	2	0	1	0	0	1	0	X	7
New Brunswick (Stewart)	0	1	0	1	0	1	1	0	1	X	5

==== Draw 9 ====
Wednesday, March 27, 9:00 am

Sheet A	1	2	3	4	5	6	7	8	9	10	Final
Ontario 2 (MacTavish)	1	0	1	0	0	1	0	0	X	X	3
Manitoba 1 (McDonald)	0	3	0	5	3	0	0	0	X	X	11

Sheet B	1	2	3	4	5	6	7	8	9	10	Final
British Columbia 1 (Fenton)	0	1	0	0	1	0	0	1	0	X	3
Saskatchewan 2 (Derksen)	1	0	0	4	0	0	2	0	1	X	8

Sheet C	1	2	3	4	5	6	7	8	9	10	Final
New Brunswick (Stewart)	1	0	1	1	0	0	3	0	0	1	7
Newfoundland and Labrador (Tipple)	0	0	0	0	3	0	0	1	2	0	6

Sheet D	1	2	3	4	5	6	7	8	9	10	Final
Quebec (Bédard)	0	0	0	0	1	0	0	1	X	X	2
Saskatchewan 1 (Drewitz)	1	1	2	4	0	0	1	0	X	X	9

Sheet E	1	2	3	4	5	6	7	8	9	10	11	Final
British Columbia 2 (Duncan-Wu)	0	1	2	0	0	0	3	0	0	1	0	7
Northern Ontario 1 (Dubinsky)	1	0	0	4	0	0	0	1	1	0	1	8

Sheet F	1	2	3	4	5	6	7	8	9	10	Final
Manitoba 2 (Freeman)	2	2	0	0	0	1	1	2	X	X	8
Alberta 1 (Wipf)	0	0	2	0	1	0	0	0	X	X	3

Sheet G	1	2	3	4	5	6	7	8	9	10	Final
Nova Scotia 1 (MacIsaac)	3	0	0	2	0	3	0	3	X	X	11
Northern Ontario 2 (Simms)	0	1	0	0	2	0	2	0	X	X	5

Sheet H	1	2	3	4	5	6	7	8	9	10	Final
Prince Edward Island (MacFadyen)	0	0	2	0	0	1	0	0	X	X	3
Alberta 2 (Marin)	0	1	0	4	0	0	1	5	X	X	11

==== Draw 11 ====
Wednesday, March 27, 7:00 pm

Sheet A	1	2	3	4	5	6	7	8	9	10	Final
Newfoundland and Labrador (Tipple)	0	0	1	2	0	0	1	0	0	3	7
British Columbia 1 (Fenton)	0	0	0	0	1	3	0	2	0	0	6

Sheet B	1	2	3	4	5	6	7	8	9	10	Final
New Brunswick (Stewart)	4	1	3	1	0	0	2	0	X	X	11
Quebec (Bédard)	0	0	0	0	1	2	0	1	X	X	4

Sheet C	1	2	3	4	5	6	7	8	9	10	Final
Manitoba 1 (McDonald)	2	1	0	2	2	0	0	2	X	X	9
Nova Scotia 2 (Mosher)	0	0	2	0	0	1	0	0	X	X	3

Sheet D	1	2	3	4	5	6	7	8	9	10	Final
Ontario 2 (MacTavish)	1	0	0	1	0	0	2	0	2	0	6
Saskatchewan 2 (Derksen)	0	2	1	0	2	0	0	2	0	2	9

Sheet E	1	2	3	4	5	6	7	8	9	10	Final
Northern Ontario 2 (Simms)	0	1	0	2	0	0	0	3	2	X	8
Manitoba 2 (Freeman)	0	0	2	0	2	0	1	0	0	X	5

Sheet F	1	2	3	4	5	6	7	8	9	10	Final
Nova Scotia 1 (MacIsaac)	0	2	0	3	0	0	0	0	3	X	8
Prince Edward Island (MacFadyen)	2	0	1	0	1	0	0	1	0	X	5

Sheet G	1	2	3	4	5	6	7	8	9	10	Final
Northern Ontario 1 (Dubinsky)	0	1	0	0	2	0	1	0	0	X	4
Ontario 1 (Mulima)	2	0	2	0	0	2	0	2	1	X	9

Sheet H	1	2	3	4	5	6	7	8	9	10	Final
British Columbia 2 (Duncan-Wu)	0	0	1	1	0	0	1	0	X	X	3
Alberta 1 (Wipf)	1	1	0	0	4	3	0	1	X	X	10

==== Draw 13 ====
Thursday, March 28, 2:00 pm

Sheet A	1	2	3	4	5	6	7	8	9	10	Final
Ontario 1 (Mulima)	0	0	0	0	1	0	0	1	X	X	2
Nova Scotia 1 (MacIsaac)	0	2	0	0	0	4	1	0	X	X	7

Sheet B	1	2	3	4	5	6	7	8	9	10	Final
British Columbia 2 (Duncan-Wu)	1	2	1	0	3	0	1	0	2	0	10
Alberta 2 (Marin)	0	0	0	2	0	4	0	2	0	1	9

Sheet C	1	2	3	4	5	6	7	8	9	10	Final
Manitoba 2 (Freeman)	0	2	0	0	3	0	2	0	2	X	9
Prince Edward Island (MacFadyen)	0	0	1	1	0	2	0	2	0	X	6

Sheet D	1	2	3	4	5	6	7	8	9	10	Final
Northern Ontario 2 (Simms)	0	0	1	0	1	0	0	1	X	X	3
Northern Ontario 1 (Dubinsky)	2	1	0	3	0	1	2	0	X	X	9

Sheet E	1	2	3	4	5	6	7	8	9	10	Final
Nova Scotia 2 (Mosher)	0	2	2	1	0	2	0	0	2	X	9
New Brunswick (Stewart)	0	0	0	0	2	0	1	1	0	X	4

Sheet F	1	2	3	4	5	6	7	8	9	10	Final
Ontario 2 (MacTavish)	0	0	0	0	0	0	0	1	X	X	1
Saskatchewan 1 (Drewitz)	0	2	1	2	1	2	0	0	X	X	8

Sheet G	1	2	3	4	5	6	7	8	9	10	Final
British Columbia 1 (Fenton)	2	5	0	4	0	0	3	0	X	X	14
Quebec (Bédard)	0	0	1	0	1	0	0	1	X	X	3

Sheet H	1	2	3	4	5	6	7	8	9	10	Final
Newfoundland and Labrador (Tipple)	0	1	0	1	0	1	0	0	1	0	4
Manitoba 1 (McDonald)	1	0	1	0	2	0	2	0	0	0	6

==== Draw 15 ====
Friday, March 29, 9:00 am

Sheet A	1	2	3	4	5	6	7	8	9	10	Final
Quebec (Bédard)	1	0	4	0	0	1	1	0	0	X	7
Ontario 2 (MacTavish)	0	1	0	4	2	0	0	3	1	X	11

Sheet B	1	2	3	4	5	6	7	8	9	10	Final
Newfoundland and Labrador (Tipple)	0	0	0	1	2	2	1	0	0	1	7
Nova Scotia 2 (Mosher)	2	1	0	0	0	0	0	2	0	0	5

Sheet C	1	2	3	4	5	6	7	8	9	10	Final
Saskatchewan 2 (Derksen)	1	0	1	1	0	2	1	0	0	X	6
Saskatchewan 1 (Drewitz)	0	1	0	0	1	0	0	2	0	X	4

Sheet D	1	2	3	4	5	6	7	8	9	10	Final
New Brunswick (Stewart)	1	1	0	2	0	1	0	0	3	0	8
British Columbia 1 (Fenton)	0	0	1	0	3	0	2	2	0	1	9

Sheet E	1	2	3	4	5	6	7	8	9	10	Final
Prince Edward Island (MacFadyen)	2	0	0	1	0	0	1	1	0	0	5
British Columbia 2 (Duncan-Wu)	0	2	1	0	2	1	0	0	2	2	10

Sheet F	1	2	3	4	5	6	7	8	9	10	Final
Northern Ontario 2 (Simms)	0	1	0	2	0	0	0	3	0	X	6
Ontario 1 (Mulima)	1	0	2	0	1	0	2	0	4	X	10

Sheet G	1	2	3	4	5	6	7	8	9	10	Final
Alberta 1 (Wipf)	0	3	0	1	1	0	0	0	4	X	9
Alberta 2 (Marin)	2	0	1	0	0	2	0	0	0	X	5

Sheet H	1	2	3	4	5	6	7	8	9	10	Final
Nova Scotia 1 (MacIsaac)	0	2	2	1	2	0	0	1	0	X	8
Manitoba 2 (Freeman)	0	0	0	0	0	1	1	0	0	X	2

==== Draw 17 ====
Friday, March 29, 7:00 pm

Sheet A	1	2	3	4	5	6	7	8	9	10	Final
Alberta 2 (Marin)	1	0	3	0	1	0	0	1	0	2	8
Northern Ontario 2 (Simms)	0	2	0	0	0	0	2	0	3	0	7

Sheet B	1	2	3	4	5	6	7	8	9	10	Final
Alberta 1 (Wipf)	0	2	2	0	0	1	0	4	X	X	9
Northern Ontario 1 (Dubinsky)	0	0	0	0	1	0	1	0	X	X	2

Sheet C	1	2	3	4	5	6	7	8	9	10	Final
British Columbia 2 (Duncan-Wu)	1	0	1	0	1	0	1	1	0	X	5
Nova Scotia 1 (MacIsaac)	0	1	0	3	0	3	0	0	1	X	8

Sheet D	1	2	3	4	5	6	7	8	9	10	Final
Ontario 1 (Mulima)	0	2	2	0	3	0	0	2	X	X	9
Prince Edward Island (MacFadyen)	0	0	0	1	0	1	1	0	X	X	3

Sheet E	1	2	3	4	5	6	7	8	9	10	Final
Saskatchewan 1 (Drewitz)	0	0	1	0	0	3	0	1	0	0	5
Newfoundland and Labrador (Tipple)	0	0	0	1	1	0	2	0	2	1	7

Sheet F	1	2	3	4	5	6	7	8	9	10	Final
Saskatchewan 2 (Derksen)	0	2	0	0	2	0	2	1	0	1	8
Manitoba 1 (McDonald)	1	0	1	1	0	3	0	0	1	0	7

Sheet G	1	2	3	4	5	6	7	8	9	10	Final
Ontario 2 (MacTavish)	4	1	0	4	0	0	1	0	X	X	10
New Brunswick (Stewart)	0	0	1	0	1	1	0	1	X	X	4

Sheet H	1	2	3	4	5	6	7	8	9	10	Final
Nova Scotia 2 (Mosher)	1	1	3	2	2	0	X	X	X	X	9
Quebec (Bédard)	0	0	0	0	0	1	X	X	X	X	1

=== Playoffs ===
Quarterfinals
B2	Nova Scotia 1	8
A3	Newfoundland and Labrador	4
A2	Manitoba 1	5
B3	Manitoba 2	6

Semifinals
A1	Saskatchewan 2	5
B2	Nova Scotia 1	7
B1	Alberta 1	7
B3	Manitoba 2	5

Final
B2	Nova Scotia 1	6
B1	Alberta 1	7
Bronze medal game
A1	Saskatchewan 2	5
B3	Manitoba 2	7

==== Quarterfinals ====
Saturday, March 30, 1:00 pm

Sheet C	1	2	3	4	5	6	7	8	9	10	Final
Nova Scotia 1 (MacIsaac)	0	3	0	0	2	0	2	0	1	X	8
Newfoundland and Labrador (Tipple)	1	0	2	0	0	1	0	0	0	X	4

Sheet D	1	2	3	4	5	6	7	8	9	10	Final
Manitoba 1 (McDonald)	0	2	0	0	0	0	0	0	3	0	5
Manitoba 2 (Freeman)	1	0	0	0	3	0	1	0	0	1	6

==== Semifinals ====
Saturday, March 30, 7:00 pm

Sheet B	1	2	3	4	5	6	7	8	9	10	Final
Alberta 1 (Wipf)	2	0	2	0	0	0	0	2	1	0	7
Manitoba 2 (Freeman)	0	3	0	0	0	0	1	0	0	1	5

Sheet D	1	2	3	4	5	6	7	8	9	10	Final
Saskatchewan 2 (Derksen)	0	0	2	0	1	0	1	0	1	X	5
Nova Scotia 1 (MacIsaac)	1	1	0	3	0	1	0	1	0	X	7

==== Bronze medal game ====
Sunday, March 31, 11:00 am

Sheet E	1	2	3	4	5	6	7	8	9	10	11	Final
Saskatchewan 2 (Derksen)	0	0	0	0	0	0	1	3	0	1	0	5
Manitoba 2 (Freeman)	0	1	0	0	1	2	0	0	1	0	2	7

==== Final ====
Sunday, March 31, 11:00 am

Sheet C	1	2	3	4	5	6	7	8	9	10	Final
Nova Scotia 1 (MacIsaac)	0	3	0	0	1	0	0	0	2	0	6
Alberta 1 (Wipf)	1	0	0	2	0	2	0	1	0	1	7

=== Final standings ===
Place	Team
1st place, gold medalist(s)	Alberta 1
2nd place, silver medalist(s)	Nova Scotia 1
3rd place, bronze medalist(s)	Manitoba 2
4	Saskatchewan 2
5	Manitoba 1
6	Newfoundland and Labrador
7	Ontario 1
8	Nova Scotia 2
9	Alberta 2
10	British Columbia 1
11	Saskatchewan 1
12	Northern Ontario 1
13	British Columbia 2
14	Northern Ontario 2
15	Ontario 2
16	New Brunswick
17	Prince Edward Island
18	Quebec

== Women ==
=== Teams ===
The teams are listed as follows:

Province / Territory	Skip	Third	Second	Lead	Alternate	Club(s)
Alberta 1	Emma DeSchiffart	Emma Yarmuch	Morgan DeSchiffart	Sarah Yarmuch	Rhiley DeSchiffart	Lacombe / Saville
Alberta 2	Claire Booth (Fourth)	Keelie Duncan	Grace Beaudry (Skip)	Carley Hardie	Kate Ector	The Glencoe Club, Calgary
British Columbia	Emily Bowles	Meredith Cole	Gabby Brissette	Mahra Harris		Victoria CC, Victoria
Manitoba 1	Shaela Hayward	Keira Krahn	India Young	Rylie Cox		Carman CC, Carman
Manitoba 2	Zoey Terrick	Cassidy Dundas	Tessa Terrick	Jensen Letham	Taylor Letham	Heather CC, Winnipeg
New Brunswick	Mélodie Forsythe	Rebecca Watson	Caylee Smith	Paige Brewer		Moncton / Fredericton
Newfoundland and Labrador 1	Cailey Locke	Hayley Gushue	Sitaye Penney	Izzy Paterson		RE/MAX Centre, St. John's
Newfoundland and Labrador 2	Sarah McDonah	Katie Peddigrew	Kate Young	Kayla Musseau		RE/MAX Centre, St. John's
Northern Ontario 1	Claire Dubinsky	Rylie Paul	Bella McCarville	Lily Ariganello		Kakabeka Falls CC, Kakabeka Falls
Northern Ontario 2	Mia Toner	Britney Malette	Justine Toner	Clara Dissanayake	Karli Hicklin	Northern Credit Union CC, Sudbury
Northwest Territories	Kali Skauge (Fourth)	Sydney Galusha (Skip)	Ella Skauge	Mackenzie Chiasson	Brynn Chorostkowski	Yellowknife CC, Yellowknife
Nova Scotia 1	Allyson MacNutt	Maria Fitzgerald	Alison Umlah	Grace McCusker		Halifax CC, Halifax
Nova Scotia 2	Cassidy Blades	Stephanie Atherton	Kate Weissent	Anna MacNutt		Truro CC, Truro
Ontario 1	Julia Markle	Evelyn Robert	Scotia Maltman	Sadie McCutcheon	Jenny Madden	London CC, London
Ontario 2	Ava Acres	Aila Thompson	Isabella McLean	Mya Sharpe	Emma Acres	RCMP CC, Ottawa
Prince Edward Island	Ella Lenentine	Makiya Noonan	Reid Hart	Erika Pater		Summerside / Cornwall
Quebec	Jolianne Fortin	Emy Lafrance	Megan Lafrance	Mégane Fortin		CC Kénogami, Jonquière
Saskatchewan	Jenna Pomedli	Melissa Remeshylo	Kelsey Noyes	Kylie Willms		Nutana CC, Saskatoon

=== Round robin standings ===
Final Round Robin Standings

Key
Teams to Playoffs

Pool A	Skip	W	L	W–L	DSC
Nova Scotia 1	Allyson MacNutt	8	0	–	990.9
Quebec	Jolianne Fortin	6	2	–	710.9
Manitoba 1	Shaela Hayward	5	3	1–0	1441.7
Ontario 2	Ava Acres	5	3	0–1	692.8
British Columbia	Emily Bowles	4	4	–	1051.8
Prince Edward Island	Ella Lenentine	3	5	–	1079.4
Manitoba 2	Zoey Terrick	2	6	1–0	681.7
Northern Ontario 1	Claire Dubinsky	2	6	0–1	853.3
Saskatchewan	Jenna Pomedli	1	7	–	1112.4

Pool B	Skip	W	L	W–L	DSC
Ontario 1	Julia Markle	6	2	1–1	455.4
Alberta 2	Grace Beaudry	6	2	1–1	823.4
Nova Scotia 2	Cassidy Blades	6	2	1–1	1154.1
Alberta 1	Emma DeSchiffart	5	3	1–0	702.1
New Brunswick	Mélodie Forsythe	5	3	0–1	757.7
Newfoundland and Labrador 1	Cailey Locke	3	5	–	828.9
Northwest Territories	Sydney Galusha	2	6	1–0	713.9
Northern Ontario 2	Mia Toner	2	6	0–1	963.1
Newfoundland and Labrador 2	Sarah McDonah	1	7	–	1359.0

=== Round robin results ===
All draw times are listed in Eastern Time (UTC−04:00).

==== Draw 2 ====
Sunday, March 24, 9:00 pm

Sheet A	1	2	3	4	5	6	7	8	9	10	Final
Quebec (Fortin)	0	0	0	0	0	0	1	0	X	X	1
Nova Scotia 1 (MacNutt)	1	2	1	5	1	4	0	1	X	X	15

Sheet B	1	2	3	4	5	6	7	8	9	10	Final
Manitoba 1 (Hayward)	0	0	0	0	3	0	0	0	2	0	5
Northern Ontario 1 (Dubinsky)	0	1	2	1	0	1	1	1	0	1	8

Sheet C	1	2	3	4	5	6	7	8	9	10	Final
Manitoba 2 (Terrick)	1	0	0	1	0	1	1	0	2	0	6
Ontario 2 (Acres)	0	0	2	0	2	0	0	2	0	1	7

Sheet D	1	2	3	4	5	6	7	8	9	10	Final
Saskatchewan (Pomedli)	0	3	0	1	2	0	1	0	1	0	8
British Columbia (Bowles)	1	0	2	0	0	3	0	2	0	1	9

Sheet E	1	2	3	4	5	6	7	8	9	10	Final
Ontario 1 (Markle)	0	0	2	0	2	0	0	2	0	1	7
Alberta 1 (DeSchiffart)	1	0	0	2	0	0	2	0	0	0	5

Sheet F	1	2	3	4	5	6	7	8	9	10	Final
New Brunswick (Forsythe)	0	3	1	2	1	2	1	0	X	X	10
Northwest Territories (Galusha)	1	0	0	0	0	0	0	1	X	X	2

Sheet G	1	2	3	4	5	6	7	8	9	10	Final
Alberta 2 (Beaudry)	1	0	1	2	0	2	0	3	0	X	9
Northern Ontario 2 (Toner)	0	3	0	0	1	0	2	0	1	X	7

Sheet H	1	2	3	4	5	6	7	8	9	10	Final
Nova Scotia 2 (Blades)	2	1	0	3	3	0	6	0	X	X	15
Newfoundland and Labrador 2 (McDonah)	0	0	1	0	0	1	0	1	X	X	3

==== Draw 4 ====
Monday, March 25, 2:00 pm

Sheet A	1	2	3	4	5	6	7	8	9	10	Final
Manitoba 1 (Hayward)	0	3	0	2	0	0	0	0	0	3	8
Saskatchewan (Pomedli)	1	0	1	0	1	1	1	1	1	0	7

Sheet B	1	2	3	4	5	6	7	8	9	10	11	Final
Prince Edward Island (Lenentine)	0	1	1	0	0	0	1	0	2	0	1	6
Manitoba 2 (Terrick)	1	0	0	1	1	0	0	1	0	1	0	5

Sheet C	1	2	3	4	5	6	7	8	9	10	Final
British Columbia (Bowles)	0	1	0	1	0	2	0	0	0	X	4
Nova Scotia 1 (MacNutt)	1	0	2	0	3	0	2	1	2	X	11

Sheet D	1	2	3	4	5	6	7	8	9	10	Final
Northern Ontario 1 (Dubinsky)	0	0	0	0	0	2	0	1	X	X	3
Ontario 2 (Acres)	3	2	2	1	6	0	1	0	X	X	15

Sheet E	1	2	3	4	5	6	7	8	9	10	Final
New Brunswick (Forsythe)	0	0	1	0	1	0	3	0	2	X	7
Nova Scotia 2 (Blades)	0	0	0	1	0	1	0	1	0	X	3

Sheet F	1	2	3	4	5	6	7	8	9	10	Final
Newfoundland and Labrador 1 (Locke)	0	1	0	0	0	0	0	0	2	X	3
Alberta 2 (Beaudry)	0	0	1	1	1	1	1	1	0	X	6

Sheet G	1	2	3	4	5	6	7	8	9	10	Final
Newfoundland and Labrador 2 (McDonah)	0	0	0	1	1	0	0	1	X	X	3
Alberta 1 (DeSchiffart)	0	3	2	0	0	4	4	0	X	X	13

Sheet H	1	2	3	4	5	6	7	8	9	10	Final
Northwest Territories (Galusha)	2	0	1	1	0	1	0	1	0	1	7
Northern Ontario 2 (Toner)	0	1	0	0	2	0	2	0	1	0	6

==== Draw 6 ====
Tuesday, March 26, 9:00 am

Sheet A	1	2	3	4	5	6	7	8	9	10	Final
Northwest Territories (Galusha)	0	3	0	2	2	0	1	0	0	X	8
Newfoundland and Labrador 2 (McDonah)	0	0	1	0	0	1	0	3	1	X	6

Sheet B	1	2	3	4	5	6	7	8	9	10	Final
Nova Scotia 2 (Blades)	0	0	1	0	0	0	1	0	0	X	2
Ontario 1 (Markle)	1	1	0	2	1	1	0	1	2	X	9

Sheet C	1	2	3	4	5	6	7	8	9	10	Final
Newfoundland and Labrador 1 (Locke)	0	0	0	0	1	1	1	0	X	X	3
New Brunswick (Forsythe)	0	3	1	1	0	0	0	4	X	X	9

Sheet D	1	2	3	4	5	6	7	8	9	10	Final
Alberta 1 (DeSchiffart)	0	2	0	0	2	2	0	2	0	2	10
Alberta 2 (Beaudry)	2	0	1	1	0	0	1	0	2	0	7

Sheet E	1	2	3	4	5	6	7	8	9	10	Final
Northern Ontario 1 (Dubinsky)	0	2	0	2	1	1	1	1	0	1	9
British Columbia (Bowles)	3	0	1	0	0	0	0	0	2	0	6

Sheet F	1	2	3	4	5	6	7	8	9	10	Final
Saskatchewan (Pomedli)	1	0	0	0	0	0	1	0	0	X	2
Quebec (Fortin)	0	1	0	1	1	0	0	0	1	X	4

Sheet G	1	2	3	4	5	6	7	8	9	10	Final
Prince Edward Island (Lenentine)	1	0	3	0	0	0	2	0	1	0	7
Manitoba 1 (Hayward)	0	1	0	2	2	1	0	2	0	1	9

Sheet H	1	2	3	4	5	6	7	8	9	10	Final
Nova Scotia 1 (MacNutt)	3	2	0	2	0	0	1	0	1	X	9
Manitoba 2 (Terrick)	0	0	1	0	1	2	0	2	0	X	6

==== Draw 8 ====
Tuesday, March 26, 7:00 pm

Sheet A	1	2	3	4	5	6	7	8	9	10	Final
Alberta 1 (DeSchiffart)	1	0	0	0	1	0	3	1	0	0	6
Newfoundland and Labrador 1 (Locke)	0	1	1	1	0	2	0	0	2	1	8

Sheet B	1	2	3	4	5	6	7	8	9	10	Final
Newfoundland and Labrador 2 (McDonah)	0	1	0	0	1	0	0	1	0	X	3
Northern Ontario 2 (Toner)	0	0	1	1	0	0	3	0	3	X	8

Sheet C	1	2	3	4	5	6	7	8	9	10	Final
Nova Scotia 2 (Blades)	0	0	0	0	3	0	5	3	X	X	11
Northwest Territories (Galusha)	1	0	2	1	0	1	0	0	X	X	5

Sheet D	1	2	3	4	5	6	7	8	9	10	11	12	Final
New Brunswick (Forsythe)	1	0	0	0	1	0	2	1	0	0	0	1	6
Ontario 1 (Markle)	0	0	1	0	0	2	0	0	1	1	0	0	5

Sheet E	1	2	3	4	5	6	7	8	9	10	Final
Nova Scotia 1 (MacNutt)	2	0	1	0	1	0	0	2	0	1	7
Prince Edward Island (Lenentine)	0	1	0	1	0	0	2	0	1	0	5

Sheet F	1	2	3	4	5	6	7	8	9	10	Final
British Columbia (Bowles)	0	1	0	0	2	0	0	2	0	X	5
Ontario 2 (Acres)	1	0	1	1	0	3	1	0	1	X	8

Sheet G	1	2	3	4	5	6	7	8	9	10	Final
Saskatchewan (Pomedli)	1	1	2	0	3	0	0	2	0	X	9
Northern Ontario 1 (Dubinsky)	0	0	0	3	0	1	2	0	1	X	7

Sheet H	1	2	3	4	5	6	7	8	9	10	11	Final
Manitoba 1 (Hayward)	1	0	0	1	0	1	0	2	1	0	0	6
Quebec (Fortin)	0	1	2	0	0	0	1	0	0	2	1	7

==== Draw 10 ====
Wednesday, March 27, 2:00 pm

Sheet A	1	2	3	4	5	6	7	8	9	10	Final
Ontario 2 (Acres)	0	1	0	1	0	0	0	1	0	0	3
Manitoba 1 (Hayward)	0	0	1	0	1	1	0	0	1	1	5

Sheet B	1	2	3	4	5	6	7	8	9	10	Final
Northern Ontario 1 (Dubinsky)	0	1	0	0	1	0	1	0	1	X	4
Nova Scotia 1 (MacNutt)	0	0	2	2	0	1	0	2	0	X	7

Sheet C	1	2	3	4	5	6	7	8	9	10	Final
Quebec (Fortin)	3	2	0	0	1	0	2	0	X	X	8
Manitoba 2 (Terrick)	0	0	0	1	0	1	0	1	X	X	3

Sheet D	1	2	3	4	5	6	7	8	9	10	Final
Prince Edward Island (Lenentine)	1	0	1	0	1	3	0	0	0	1	7
Saskatchewan (Pomedli)	0	1	0	1	0	0	0	2	1	0	5

Sheet E	1	2	3	4	5	6	7	8	9	10	Final
Northern Ontario 2 (Toner)	0	0	0	3	0	3	2	0	0	1	9
New Brunswick (Forsythe)	1	2	1	0	2	0	0	2	0	0	8

Sheet F	1	2	3	4	5	6	7	8	9	10	Final
Northwest Territories (Galusha)	0	0	1	0	0	0	0	1	X	X	2
Alberta 1 (DeSchiffart)	0	1	0	3	1	1	2	0	X	X	8

Sheet G	1	2	3	4	5	6	7	8	9	10	Final
Ontario 1 (Markle)	2	0	1	0	1	1	0	1	0	0	7
Alberta 2 (Beaudry)	0	1	0	2	0	0	3	0	0	2	8

Sheet H	1	2	3	4	5	6	7	8	9	10	Final
Newfoundland and Labrador 1 (Locke)	1	1	1	0	0	0	0	0	1	0	4
Nova Scotia 2 (Blades)	0	0	0	3	0	0	1	0	0	1	5

==== Draw 12 ====
Thursday, March 28, 9:00 am

Sheet A	1	2	3	4	5	6	7	8	9	10	Final
Manitoba 2 (Terrick)	0	0	0	2	1	1	2	0	4	1	11
Northern Ontario 1 (Dubinsky)	1	0	2	0	0	0	0	4	0	0	7

Sheet B	1	2	3	4	5	6	7	8	9	10	Final
Quebec (Fortin)	0	0	3	2	0	3	2	0	X	X	10
Prince Edward Island (Lenentine)	0	0	0	0	3	0	0	1	X	X	4

Sheet C	1	2	3	4	5	6	7	8	9	10	Final
Manitoba 1 (Hayward)	0	0	2	1	2	0	2	1	1	X	9
British Columbia (Bowles)	0	2	0	0	0	2	0	0	0	X	4

Sheet D	1	2	3	4	5	6	7	8	9	10	Final
Ontario 2 (Acres)	0	1	0	0	0	2	1	0	X	X	4
Nova Scotia 1 (MacNutt)	5	0	1	2	1	0	0	2	X	X	11

Sheet E	1	2	3	4	5	6	7	8	9	10	Final
Alberta 2 (Beaudry)	0	1	1	0	1	5	2	0	2	X	12
Northwest Territories (Galusha)	1	0	0	1	0	0	0	3	0	X	5

Sheet F	1	2	3	4	5	6	7	8	9	10	Final
Ontario 1 (Markle)	1	0	0	1	0	1	0	2	0	1	6
Newfoundland and Labrador 1 (Locke)	0	1	1	0	0	0	1	0	2	0	5

Sheet G	1	2	3	4	5	6	7	8	9	10	Final
New Brunswick (Forsythe)	0	3	3	1	0	0	2	0	X	X	9
Newfoundland and Labrador 2 (McDonah)	1	0	0	0	1	0	0	1	X	X	3

Sheet H	1	2	3	4	5	6	7	8	9	10	Final
Northern Ontario 2 (Toner)	0	0	0	1	0	1	0	0	X	X	2
Alberta 1 (DeSchiffart)	0	0	0	0	1	0	3	3	X	X	7

==== Draw 14 ====
Thursday, March 28, 7:00 pm

Sheet A	1	2	3	4	5	6	7	8	9	10	Final
Newfoundland and Labrador 2 (McDonah)	0	0	0	1	0	1	0	2	0	X	4
Ontario 1 (Markle)	2	2	1	0	2	0	1	0	3	X	11

Sheet B	1	2	3	4	5	6	7	8	9	10	Final
Northern Ontario 2 (Toner)	0	1	0	2	0	2	1	0	1	0	7
Nova Scotia 2 (Blades)	1	0	2	0	2	0	0	2	0	1	8

Sheet C	1	2	3	4	5	6	7	8	9	10	Final
Northwest Territories (Galusha)	0	0	1	1	0	1	1	0	X	X	4
Newfoundland and Labrador 1 (Locke)	2	2	0	0	3	0	0	3	X	X	10

Sheet D	1	2	3	4	5	6	7	8	9	10	Final
Alberta 2 (Beaudry)	2	0	2	0	2	0	1	0	2	X	9
New Brunswick (Forsythe)	0	1	0	1	0	1	0	2	0	X	5

Sheet E	1	2	3	4	5	6	7	8	9	10	Final
British Columbia (Bowles)	1	0	3	0	2	1	1	2	X	X	10
Quebec (Fortin)	0	2	0	1	0	0	0	0	X	X	3

Sheet F	1	2	3	4	5	6	7	8	9	10	Final
Ontario 2 (Acres)	0	2	1	0	3	2	0	0	0	0	8
Saskatchewan (Pomedli)	1	0	0	1	0	0	1	1	1	2	7

Sheet G	1	2	3	4	5	6	7	8	9	10	Final
Northern Ontario 1 (Dubinsky)	0	1	0	0	2	0	2	0	1	0	6
Prince Edward Island (Lenentine)	1	0	2	1	0	2	0	1	0	1	8

Sheet H	1	2	3	4	5	6	7	8	9	10	Final
Manitoba 2 (Terrick)	0	0	1	0	1	0	1	0	X	X	3
Manitoba 1 (Hayward)	1	2	0	2	0	2	0	3	X	X	10

==== Draw 16 ====
Friday, March 29, 2:00 pm

Sheet A	1	2	3	4	5	6	7	8	9	10	Final
Prince Edward Island (Lenentine)	2	0	0	0	0	1	0	0	2	0	5
Ontario 2 (Acres)	0	2	0	1	1	0	0	4	0	1	9

Sheet B	1	2	3	4	5	6	7	8	9	10	Final
Manitoba 2 (Terrick)	0	2	0	1	0	0	1	0	0	0	4
British Columbia (Bowles)	0	0	1	0	2	1	0	2	0	1	7

Sheet C	1	2	3	4	5	6	7	8	9	10	Final
Nova Scotia 1 (MacNutt)	0	2	0	2	0	0	2	2	X	X	8
Saskatchewan (Pomedli)	0	0	1	0	0	1	0	0	X	X	2

Sheet D	1	2	3	4	5	6	7	8	9	10	Final
Quebec (Fortin)	2	0	2	0	0	0	1	0	2	X	7
Northern Ontario 1 (Dubinsky)	0	0	0	1	1	0	0	2	0	X	4

Sheet E	1	2	3	4	5	6	7	8	9	10	Final
Newfoundland and Labrador 1 (Locke)	0	1	0	3	0	4	0	3	X	X	11
Northern Ontario 2 (Toner)	0	0	0	0	3	0	1	0	X	X	4

Sheet F	1	2	3	4	5	6	7	8	9	10	Final
Alberta 2 (Beaudry)	2	0	2	2	3	3	0	1	X	X	13
Newfoundland and Labrador 2 (McDonah)	0	1	0	0	0	0	1	0	X	X	2

Sheet G	1	2	3	4	5	6	7	8	9	10	Final
Alberta 1 (DeSchiffart)	1	0	2	0	0	1	0	0	1	0	5
Nova Scotia 2 (Blades)	0	1	0	0	1	0	2	1	0	4	9

Sheet H	1	2	3	4	5	6	7	8	9	10	Final
Ontario 1 (Markle)	0	1	0	1	0	0	2	1	0	1	6
Northwest Territories (Galusha)	1	0	1	0	0	1	0	0	1	0	4

==== Draw 18 ====
Saturday, March 30, 9:00 am

Sheet A	1	2	3	4	5	6	7	8	9	10	Final
Nova Scotia 2 (Blades)	0	0	1	0	4	0	2	0	1	1	9
Alberta 2 (Beaudry)	0	2	0	1	0	1	0	2	0	0	6

Sheet B	1	2	3	4	5	6	7	8	9	10	Final
Alberta 1 (DeSchiffart)	0	3	1	0	2	2	0	0	1	X	9
New Brunswick (Forsythe)	0	0	0	2	0	0	2	2	0	X	6

Sheet C	1	2	3	4	5	6	7	8	9	10	Final
Northern Ontario 2 (Toner)	0	1	0	0	0	0	2	1	0	X	4
Ontario 1 (Markle)	1	0	1	0	1	3	0	0	3	X	9

Sheet D	1	2	3	4	5	6	7	8	9	10	Final
Newfoundland and Labrador 2 (McDonah)	1	0	0	2	2	0	3	1	0	X	9
Newfoundland and Labrador 1 (Locke)	0	1	2	0	0	2	0	0	2	X	7

Sheet E	1	2	3	4	5	6	7	8	9	10	Final
Saskatchewan (Pomedli)	0	0	1	0	0	0	2	0	X	X	3
Manitoba 2 (Terrick)	0	2	0	3	1	3	0	1	X	X	10

Sheet F	1	2	3	4	5	6	7	8	9	10	11	Final
Nova Scotia 1 (MacNutt)	2	0	1	0	2	0	0	1	1	0	1	8
Manitoba 1 (Hayward)	0	1	0	1	0	1	3	0	0	1	0	7

Sheet G	1	2	3	4	5	6	7	8	9	10	Final
Ontario 2 (Acres)	0	1	0	1	0	1	0	0	X	X	3
Quebec (Fortin)	3	0	1	0	2	0	1	2	X	X	9

Sheet H	1	2	3	4	5	6	7	8	9	10	Final
British Columbia (Bowles)	2	1	0	0	0	2	0	2	0	1	8
Prince Edward Island (Lenentine)	0	0	1	1	1	0	2	0	2	0	7

=== Playoffs ===
Quarterfinals
B2	Alberta 2	9
A3	Manitoba 1	3
A2	Quebec	7
B3	Nova Scotia 2	8

Semifinals
A1	Nova Scotia 1	9
B2	Alberta 2	2
B1	Ontario 1	7
B3	Nova Scotia 2	4

Final
A1	Nova Scotia 1	9
B1	Ontario 1	5
Bronze medal game
B2	Alberta 2	7
B3	Nova Scotia 2	3

==== Quarterfinals ====
Saturday, March 30, 7:00 pm

Sheet A	1	2	3	4	5	6	7	8	9	10	Final
Alberta 2 (Beaudry)	0	1	0	0	4	1	0	3	X	X	9
Manitoba 1 (Hayward)	0	0	1	0	0	0	2	0	X	X	3

Sheet C	1	2	3	4	5	6	7	8	9	10	Final
Quebec (Fortin)	3	1	0	0	0	0	2	0	1	0	7
Nova Scotia 2 (Blades)	0	0	1	2	1	0	0	3	0	1	8

==== Semifinals ====
Sunday, March 31, 9:00 am

Sheet B	1	2	3	4	5	6	7	8	9	10	Final
Ontario 1 (Markle)	0	0	1	1	0	1	1	0	3	X	7
Nova Scotia 2 (Blades)	0	1	0	0	3	0	0	0	0	X	4

Sheet D	1	2	3	4	5	6	7	8	9	10	Final
Nova Scotia 1 (MacNutt)	0	2	0	0	4	1	1	1	X	X	9
Alberta 2 (Beaudry)	0	0	0	2	0	0	0	0	X	X	2

==== Bronze medal game ====
Sunday, March 31, 3:00 pm

Sheet E	1	2	3	4	5	6	7	8	9	10	Final
Alberta 2 (Beaudry)	0	2	1	0	0	1	1	1	1	X	7
Nova Scotia 2 (Blades)	0	0	0	2	1	0	0	0	0	X	3

==== Final ====
Sunday, March 31, 3:00 pm

Sheet C	1	2	3	4	5	6	7	8	9	10	Final
Nova Scotia 1 (MacNutt)	0	3	1	0	2	0	1	0	1	1	9
Ontario 1 (Markle)	0	0	0	2	0	2	0	1	0	0	5

=== Final standings ===
Place	Team
1st place, gold medalist(s)	Nova Scotia 1
2nd place, silver medalist(s)	Ontario 1
3rd place, bronze medalist(s)	Alberta 2
4	Nova Scotia 2
5	Quebec
6	Manitoba 1
7	Ontario 2
8	Alberta 1
9	New Brunswick
10	British Columbia
11	Newfoundland and Labrador 1
12	Prince Edward Island
13	Manitoba 2
14	Northwest Territories
15	Northern Ontario 1
16	Northern Ontario 2
17	Saskatchewan
18	Newfoundland and Labrador 2

== Qualification ==
=== Ontario ===
The Ontario U-21 Curling Championships were held from February 28–March 3, 2024 at the Dundas Valley Golf & Curling Club in Dundas.

The championship was held in a round robin format, which qualified three teams for a playoff. Two men's and two women's teams qualified for the national championship.

Pre-Playoff Results:

Men	W	L
Kibo Mulima (Guelph)	6	1
Tyler MacTavish (K-W Granite)	5	2
Noah Garner (Ottawa Hunt)	5	2
Aaron Benning (Ottawa Hunt)	4	3
Evan MacDougall (Hamilton Victoria)	3	4
Wyatt Wright (Hamilton Victoria)	3	4
Sonny DiFranco (Ottawa Hunt)	2	5
Ryan Hastings (Oshawa)	0	7

Women	W	L
Julia Markle (London)	7	0
Ava Acres (RCMP)	5	2
Katelin Langford (Peterborough)	5	2
Charlotte Johnston (Barrie)	5	2
Daniela Aucoin (Grimsby)	3	4
Abigail Parkinson (Dundas Valley)	2	5
Isabelle Daigle (Granite of West Ottawa)	1	6
Jenny Madden (Rideau)	0	7

Playoff Results:

- Men's Semifinal: MacTavish 7, Garner 6
- Men's Final 1: Mulima 8, MacTavish 4
- Men's Final 2: MacTavish 11, Garner 4
- Women's Tiebreaker: Johnston 10, Langford 4
- Women's Semifinal: Acres 6, Johnston 5
- Women's Final 1: Markle 6, Acres 1
- Women's Final 2: Acres 9, Johnston 6
