= 2026 Ocean Contractors Women's Curling Championship =

Canadian provincial women's curling championship

- Host city: Halifax, Nova Scotia
- Arena: Halifax Curling Club
- Dates: January 6–11
- Winner: Team Stevens
- Curling club: Halifax CC, Halifax
- Skip: Taylour Stevens
- Third: Maria Fitzgerald
- Second: Alison Umlah
- Lead: Cate Fitzgerald
- Coach: Kevin Ouellette
- Finalist: Isabelle Ladouceur

The 2026 Ocean Contractors Women's Curling Championship, the provincial women's curling championship for Nova Scotia, was held from January 6 to 11 at the Halifax Curling Club in Halifax, Nova Scotia. The winning Taylour Stevens rink will represent Nova Scotia at the 2026 Scotties Tournament of Hearts in Mississauga, Ontario. The event was held in conjunction with the 2026 Ocean Contractors Men's Curling Championship, the provincial men's championship.

Having finished fourth on the CTRS standings for the 2024–25 season, defending champions and top ranked Team Christina Black earned an automatic berth at the national championship. This meant Nova Scotia would qualify two teams for the Scotties Tournament of Hearts for the first time since 2005.

== Teams ==
The teams are listed as follows:

Skip	Third	Second	Lead	Alternate	Coach	Club
Jocelyn Adams-Moss	Amanda England	Stephanie Guzzwell	Katarina Hakansson		Andrew Simpson	Mayflower CC, Timberlea
Cassidy Blades	Stephanie Atherton	Anna MacNutt	Lily Mitchell		Andrew Atherton	Halifax CC, Halifax
Sophie Blades	Kate Weissent	Alexis Cluney	Abby Slauenwhite		Anthony Purcell	Halifax CC, Halifax
Tanya Hilliard	Kristin Clarke	Taylor Clarke	Cerys Fisher		Paul Hilliard	Truro CC, Truro
Isabelle Ladouceur	Cally Moore	Emilie Proulx	Isabel Reeves	Sheena Moore	Michel Ladouceur	Mayflower CC, Timberlea
Kristen MacDiarmid	Allyson MacNutt	Kristen Lind	Julia Colter		Theresa Breen	Halifax CC, Halifax
Rebecca Regan	Olivia McDonah	Caylee Smith	Ella Kinley		Heather Smith	Mayflower CC, Timberlea
Taylour Stevens	Maria Fitzgerald	Alison Umlah	Cate Fitzgerald		Kevin Ouellette	Halifax CC, Halifax

== Round robin standings ==
Final Round Robin Standings

Key
Teams to Playoffs

Skip	W	L	W–L	PF	PA	EW	EL	BE	SE
Taylour Stevens	7	0	–	67	25	32	18	3	13
Isabelle Ladouceur	5	2	1–0	48	43	33	29	2	12
Rebecca Regan	5	2	0–1	56	41	33	28	4	8
Cassidy Blades	4	3	–	46	48	30	28	2	8
Tanya Hilliard	2	5	2–0	47	49	30	35	3	9
Kristen MacDiarmid	2	5	1–1	38	55	25	30	1	6
Sophie Blades	2	5	0–2	39	42	28	32	4	5
Jocelyn Adams-Moss	1	6	–	28	64	21	32	3	5

== Round robin results ==
All draw times listed in Atlantic Time (UTC−04:00).

=== Draw 2 ===
Tuesday, January 6, 7:00 pm

Sheet 1	1	2	3	4	5	6	7	8	9	10	Final
Kristen MacDiarmid	0	0	2	0	1	0	3	0	2	X	8
Sophie Blades	0	0	0	1	0	2	0	2	0	X	5

Sheet 8	1	2	3	4	5	6	7	8	9	10	Final
Isabelle Ladouceur	0	2	0	1	0	2	0	0	2	1	8
Rebecca Regan	1	0	2	0	2	0	0	2	0	0	7

Sheet 2	1	2	3	4	5	6	7	8	9	10	Final
Jocelyn Adams-Moss	0	1	0	0	0	1	1	0	1	X	4
Cassidy Blades	0	0	2	1	1	0	0	3	0	X	7

Sheet 4	1	2	3	4	5	6	7	8	9	10	Final
Taylour Stevens	0	0	1	1	1	0	2	0	4	X	9
Tanya Hilliard	0	0	0	0	0	1	0	2	0	X	3

=== Draw 4 ===
Wednesday, January 7, 12:00 pm

Sheet 1	1	2	3	4	5	6	7	8	9	10	Final
Isabelle Ladouceur	0	0	0	3	0	1	0	3	0	0	7
Cassidy Blades	0	1	1	0	1	0	1	0	2	2	8

Sheet 8	1	2	3	4	5	6	7	8	9	10	Final
Kristen MacDiarmid	0	1	0	1	0	0	2	1	0	X	5
Tanya Hilliard	1	0	3	0	3	1	0	0	5	X	13

Sheet 2	1	2	3	4	5	6	7	8	9	10	Final
Taylour Stevens	0	2	0	0	2	1	1	0	1	X	7
Sophie Blades	0	0	1	1	0	0	0	1	0	X	3

Sheet 4	1	2	3	4	5	6	7	8	9	10	Final
Jocelyn Adams-Moss	0	2	0	0	2	0	0	0	X	X	4
Rebecca Regan	0	0	3	1	0	2	1	3	X	X	10

=== Draw 6 ===
Wednesday, January 7, 8:00 pm

Sheet 1	1	2	3	4	5	6	7	8	9	10	Final
Taylour Stevens	0	2	2	4	0	4	X	X	X	X	12
Jocelyn Adams-Moss	0	0	0	0	1	0	X	X	X	X	1

Sheet 2	1	2	3	4	5	6	7	8	9	10	Final
Sophie Blades	1	0	0	0	2	1	1	0	0	1	6
Cassidy Blades	0	1	0	1	0	0	0	1	1	0	4

Sheet 3	1	2	3	4	5	6	7	8	9	10	11	Final
Tanya Hilliard	0	0	0	2	0	0	2	1	1	1	0	7
Rebecca Regan	2	1	1	0	2	1	0	0	0	0	1	8

Sheet 4	1	2	3	4	5	6	7	8	9	10	Final
Kristen MacDiarmid	0	2	0	1	0	2	0	0	0	0	5
Isabelle Ladouceur	0	0	1	0	1	0	1	1	1	2	7

=== Draw 8 ===
Thursday, January 8, 2:00 pm

Sheet 1	1	2	3	4	5	6	7	8	9	10	Final
Cassidy Blades	1	0	0	1	0	1	0	1	0	X	4
Rebecca Regan	0	1	2	0	1	0	1	0	4	X	9

Sheet 8	1	2	3	4	5	6	7	8	9	10	Final
Taylour Stevens	0	3	2	0	2	2	0	X	X	X	9
Kristen MacDiarmid	1	0	0	2	0	0	1	X	X	X	4

Sheet 2	1	2	3	4	5	6	7	8	9	10	Final
Isabelle Ladouceur	0	1	0	0	0	3	1	4	1	X	10
Jocelyn Adams-Moss	0	0	1	1	4	0	0	0	0	X	6

Sheet 4	1	2	3	4	5	6	7	8	9	10	Final
Tanya Hilliard	0	0	2	0	1	0	2	0	1	1	7
Sophie Blades	1	1	0	2	0	1	0	1	0	0	6

=== Draw 10 ===
Friday, January 9, 9:00 am

Sheet 1	1	2	3	4	5	6	7	8	9	10	Final
Jocelyn Adams-Moss	0	0	1	0	0	1	1	0	X	X	3
Kristen MacDiarmid	3	1	0	2	1	0	0	2	X	X	9

Sheet 8	1	2	3	4	5	6	7	8	9	10	Final
Rebecca Regan	0	0	1	0	1	2	0	2	0	1	7
Sophie Blades	1	0	0	1	0	0	1	0	1	0	4

Sheet 2	1	2	3	4	5	6	7	8	9	10	Final
Cassidy Blades	0	2	0	0	0	1	0	2	0	2	7
Tanya Hilliard	0	0	0	2	1	0	2	0	1	0	6

Sheet 4	1	2	3	4	5	6	7	8	9	10	Final
Isabelle Ladouceur	0	0	0	2	0	1	0	0	0	X	3
Taylour Stevens	0	2	0	0	2	0	1	1	1	X	7

=== Draw 12 ===
Friday, January 9, 7:00 pm

Sheet 1	1	2	3	4	5	6	7	8	9	10	Final
Rebecca Regan	0	0	2	0	0	1	0	1	0	X	4
Taylour Stevens	0	0	0	1	1	0	5	0	2	X	9

Sheet 8	1	2	3	4	5	6	7	8	9	10	11	Final
Tanya Hilliard	0	0	2	0	0	1	0	1	1	1	0	6
Jocelyn Adams-Moss	0	2	0	1	1	0	2	0	0	0	1	7

Sheet 2	1	2	3	4	5	6	7	8	9	10	11	Final
Sophie Blades	2	0	0	0	1	0	1	0	0	1	0	5
Isabelle Ladouceur	0	1	1	0	0	1	0	1	1	0	1	6

Sheet 4	1	2	3	4	5	6	7	8	9	10	Final
Cassidy Blades	0	2	2	0	2	3	X	X	X	X	9
Kristen MacDiarmid	1	0	0	1	0	0	X	X	X	X	2

=== Draw 14 ===
Saturday, January 10, 2:00 pm

Sheet 1	1	2	3	4	5	6	7	8	9	10	Final
Tanya Hilliard	0	0	1	0	1	1	0	0	2	0	5
Isabelle Ladouceur	1	1	0	2	0	0	1	1	0	1	7

Sheet 8	1	2	3	4	5	6	7	8	9	10	Final
Cassidy Blades	1	0	1	0	3	0	0	2	0	X	7
Taylour Stevens	0	2	0	4	0	1	1	0	6	X	14

Sheet 2	1	2	3	4	5	6	7	8	9	10	Final
Rebecca Regan	2	0	1	0	2	0	2	0	2	X	9
Kristen MacDiarmid	0	1	0	1	0	2	0	1	0	X	5

Sheet 4	1	2	3	4	5	6	7	8	9	10	Final
Sophie Blades	0	1	0	3	0	5	1	X	X	X	10
Jocelyn Adams-Moss	1	0	1	0	1	0	0	X	X	X	3

== Playoffs ==
Semifinal			Final
			1	Taylour Stevens	12
2	Isabelle Ladouceur	8	2	Isabelle Ladouceur	5
3	Rebecca Regan	5

=== Semifinal ===
Saturday, January 10, 7:00 pm

Sheet 8	1	2	3	4	5	6	7	8	9	10	Final
Isabelle Ladouceur	0	1	0	0	1	0	3	2	1	X	8
Rebecca Regan	0	0	1	2	0	2	0	0	0	X	5

=== Final ===
Sunday, January 11, 3:00 pm

Sheet 3	1	2	3	4	5	6	7	8	9	10	Final
Taylour Stevens	2	3	0	0	3	0	2	2	X	X	12
Isabelle Ladouceur	0	0	0	4	0	1	0	0	X	X	5

2026 Ocean Contractors Women's Curling Championship

Taylour Stevens
1st Nova Scotia Provincial Championship title
