= Emily Deschenes =

Canadian curler

- Curler
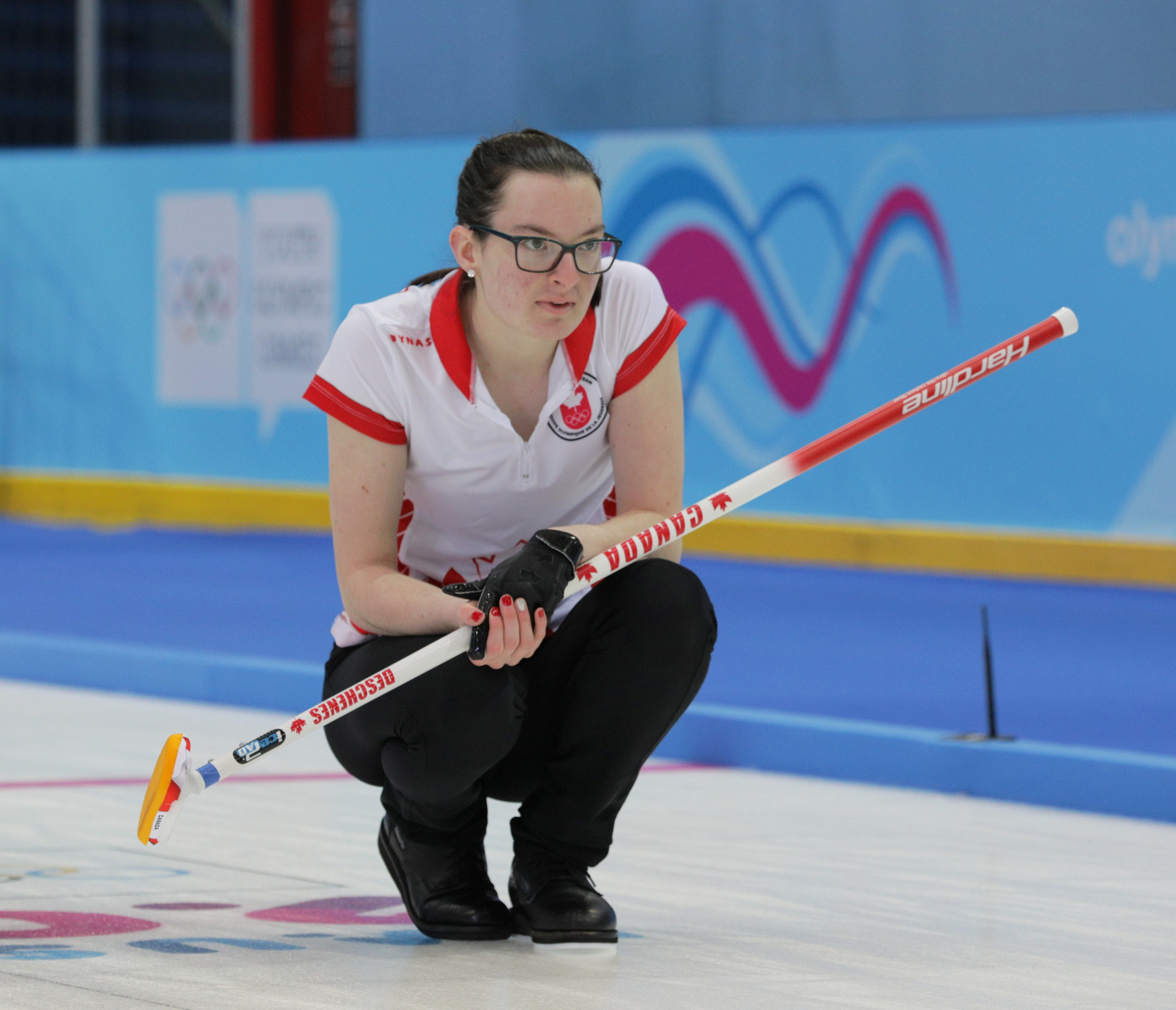
- Born: December 25, 2002 (age 23); Ottawa, Ontario

Team
- Curling club: East St. Paul CC, East St. Paul, MB
- Skip: Grace Cave
- Third: Emily Deschenes
- Second: Madison Fisher
- Lead: Melanie Ebach

Curling career
- Member Association: Ontario (2016–2023; 2026–present); Manitoba (2023–2026)
- Top CTRS ranking: 22nd (2023–24)

Emily Deschenes (born December 25, 2002) is a Canadian curler from Ottawa, Ontario. She currently plays third on Team Grace Cave.

== Career ==
Deschenes skipped her rink to silver at the 2019 Canadian U18 Curling Championships in Sherwood Park, Alberta.

Deschenes was selected to represent Canada in the 2020 Winter Youth Olympics in Lausanne, Switzerland. The rink, skipped by Nathan Young, went undefeated in the round robin, before falling to Japan in the quarter finals. Following the mixed competition, Deschenes competed in Mixed Doubles with Oriol Gasto (Spain).

Deschenes capped the 2020 season with a victory at the 2020 Ontario Winter Games.

Deschenes entered the 2020–21 season with a new rink. In just their second event together at the Stu Sells Toronto Tankard, they defeated the Jennifer Jones rink 6–4 in a round robin game and finished third for the event.

With a new look team heading into the 2021–22 season, Deschenes and her rink captured silver at the 2022 Canadian Junior Curling Championships, losing to Taylour Stevens of Nova Scotia. With Stevens aging out of junior curling, Deschenes joined the Halifax rink of Lauren Ferguson, Alison Umlah, and Cate Fitzgerald as the skip of Team Canada at the World Junior-B Curling Championships attempting to qualify Canada for the 2023 World Junior Curling Championships. The Nova Scotia rink finished third in their first event together at the U25 NextGen Classic. Deschenes and her Nova Scotia rink entered the 2022 PointsBet Invitational as the 15th seed where she took Kaitlyn Lawes to the 10th end, falling 10–8 in the Sweep 16.

Deschenes' Nova Scotia rink went undefeated at World Junior-B Curling Championships in Lohja, Finland, beating Scotland 5–4 to take home gold. The first-place finish qualified Canada for the 2023 World Junior Curling Championships in Fussen, Germany, where they finished 8th with a 2–7 round robin record.

== Personal life ==
As of 2022, Deschenes was studying Business Administration at Algonquin College.

== Teams ==
Season	Skip	Third	Second	Lead	Alternate
2016–17	Emily Deschenes	Emma Artichuk	Celeste Gauthier		Lindsay Dubue
2017–18	Emily Deschenes	Emma Artichuk	Rory Grant	Celeste Gauthier	
2018–19	Emily Deschenes	Emma Artichuk	Jillian Uniacke	Celeste Gauthier	Grace Cave
2019–20	Emily Deschenes	Emma Artichuk	Jillian Uniacke	Celeste Gauthier	Grace Cave
2020–21	Emily Deschenes	Emma Artichuk	Lindsay Dubue	Michaela Robert	Grace Lloyd
2021–22	Emily Deschenes	Emma Artichuk	Grace Lloyd	Evelyn Robert	Adrienne Belliveau
2022–23	Emily Deschenes (ON)	Adrienne Belliveau	Emma Artichuk	Evelyn Robert	
2022–23	Emily Deschenes (NS)	Lauren Ferguson	Alison Umlah	Cate Fitzgerald	Taylour Stevens
2023–24	Kristy Watling	Laura Burtnyk	Emily Deschenes	Sarah Pyke	
2024–25	Kristy Watling	Laura Burtnyk	Emily Deschenes	Sarah Pyke	
2025–26	Kristy Watling	Laura Burtnyk	Emily Deschenes	Sarah Pyke	
2026–27	Grace Cave	Emily Deschenes	Madison Fisher	Melanie Ebach	
