= Taylour Stevens =

Canadian curler (born 2000)

- Curler
- Born: August 31, 2000 (age 26); Chester, Nova Scotia

Team
- Curling club: Halifax CC, Halifax
- Skip: Taylour Stevens
- Third: Maria Fitzgerald
- Second: Alison Umlah
- Lead: Cate Fitzgerald

Curling career
- Member Association: Nova Scotia
- Hearts: 2 (2024, 2026)
- Top CTRS ranking: 28th (2023–24)
Medal record
Women's curling
Representing Nova Scotia
Canada Winter Games
Bronze medal – third place	2019 Red Deer

Taylour Stevens (born August 31, 2000) is a Canadian curler from Chester, Nova Scotia. In 2022, she skipped her team to victory at the 2022 Canadian Junior Curling Championships.

== Career ==
=== Juniors ===
Stevens was notably a member of the Cally Moore rink which represented Nova Scotia at the 2019 Canada Winter Games. They finished the round robin in fourth with a 6–4 record, qualifying them for the playoff round. They defeated Saskatchewan's Skylar Ackerman in the quarterfinals before being eliminated by eventual winners Ontario in the semifinal. They were able to pick up the bronze medal by defeating New Brunswick's Erica Cluff. This same team represented Nova Scotia later that year at the 2019 Canadian U18 Curling Championships but failed to advance to the knockout round after a 2–4 round robin record.

Stevens also won the Nova Scotia Junior Women's Championship in 2020 skipping her own team with Lindsey Burgess, Kate Callaghan and Cate Fitzgerald. The team went undefeated throughout the tournament and defeated Stevens' former teammate Moore in the final. At nationals, Stevens skipped her team to an impressive 8–2 record throughout pool play, clinching them a playoff berth. Things wouldn't go their way in the semifinal however, losing to Alberta's Abby Marks in an extra end.

After Lindsey Burgess aged out of juniors following the 2019–20 season, so the team brought on Lauren Ferguson as their new third for the abbreviated 2020–21 season. They only played in one event, finishing 1–2 at The Curling Store Cashspiel. Kate Callaghan then aged out of juniors and was replaced by Alison Umlah at the second position. The Stevens rink was chosen to represent Nova Scotia at the 2021 World Junior Qualification Event for the chance to represent Canada at the 2022 World Junior Curling Championships. Through the round robin, Stevens led Nova Scotia to a 4–1 record and then defeated Manitoba's Meghan Walter in the quarterfinal. They then lost to eventual champions Northern Ontario's Isabelle Ladouceur 6–3 in the semifinal. In December 2021, the team played in the 2022 Nova Scotia Scotties Tournament of Hearts where they finished in third place with a 4–3 record. Team Stevens was again chosen to represent Nova Scotia at the 2022 Canadian Junior Curling Championships following the cancellation of the provincial playdowns. There, Stevens led her team to an undefeated 8–0 round robin record to qualify for the playoffs. They then beat Alberta's Claire Booth in the semifinal to qualify for the final against Ontario's Emily Deschenes. Tied in the tenth end, Stevens made an open hit to secure the victory for her team 7–5. Because of her age, Stevens was ineligible to play as a junior during the 2022–23 season. Her team recruited Emily Deschenes, who they beat in the 2022 Canadian junior final, to replace Stevens as skip for the season. Stevens remained with the team in a support role and playing as alternate in women's events.

=== Women's ===
Stevens won her first provincial women's title at the 2024 Nova Scotia Scotties Tournament of Hearts, where she was the alternate for the Heather Smith rink, qualifying to represent Nova Scotia at the 2024 Scotties Tournament of Hearts. There, Smith would finish with a 3–5 record, missing the playoffs. Stevens would then start skipping her own team, alongside Maria Fitzgerald and Junior teammates Alison Umlah and Cate Fitzgerald. Stevens would win her second Nova Scotia women's title at the 2026 Ocean Contractors Women's Curling Championship, going undefeated in round-robin play and winning the final over Isabelle Ladouceur 12–5. At the 2026 Scotties Tournament of Hearts, Team Stevens went 6–2 in the round robin, qualifying for the playoffs where they would lose to club-mates and fellow Nova Scotians, Team Christina Black. It was the first time two teams from Nova Scotia played against each other in the playoffs at the Scotties.

== Personal life ==
Stevens is currently a senior staff accountant with Baker Tilly Nova Scotia and a chartered professional accountant. She is engaged to fellow curler Graeme Weagle. Her father is Nova Scotia curler, Chad Stevens.

== Teams ==
Season	Skip	Third	Second	Lead	Alternate
2015–16	Taylour Stevens	Stephanie Carson	Madison Dahl	Isabel Reeves	
2016–17	Cally Moore	Taylour Stevens	Cassidy Currie	Cate Fitzgerald	
2017–18	Cally Moore	Taylour Stevens	Cassidy Currie	Cate Fitzgerald	
2018–19	Taylour Stevens	Lindsey Burgess	Kate Callaghan	Cate Fitzgerald	
2019–20	Taylour Stevens	Lindsey Burgess	Kate Callaghan	Cate Fitzgerald	
2020–21	Taylour Stevens	Lauren Ferguson	Kate Callaghan	Cate Fitzgerald	
2021–22	Taylour Stevens	Lauren Ferguson	Alison Umlah	Cate Fitzgerald	
2022–23	Emily Deschenes	Lauren Ferguson	Alison Umlah	Cate Fitzgerald	Taylour Stevens
2023–24	Jill Brothers (Fourth)	Heather Smith (Skip)	Marie Christianson	Erin Carmody	Taylour Stevens
2024–25	Mackenzie Mitchell	Taylour Stevens	Marlise Carter	Cate Fitzgerald	
2025–26	Taylour Stevens	Maria Fitzgerald	Alison Umlah	Cate Fitzgerald	
2026–27	Taylour Stevens	Maria Fitzgerald	Alison Umlah	Cate Fitzgerald	
