= 2024 Canadian U18 Curling Championships =

- Host city: Ottawa, Ontario
- Arena: RA Centre & Ottawa Hunt and Golf Club
- Dates: February 4–10
- Men's winner: Newfoundland and Labrador 1
- Curling club: RE/MAX Centre, St. John's
- Skip: Simon Perry
- Third: Nicholas Codner
- Second: Brayden Snow
- Lead: Carter Holden
- Coach: Glenn Goss
- Finalist: Saskatchewan 1 (Derksen)
- Women's winner: Manitoba
- Curling club: Carman CC, Carman
- Skip: Shaela Hayward
- Third: Keira Krahn
- Second: India Young
- Lead: Rylie Cox
- Coach: Diane Hayward
- Finalist: Quebec 1 (J. Fortin)

The 2024 Canadian U18 Curling Championships were held from February 4 to 10 at the RA Centre and the Ottawa Hunt and Golf Club in Ottawa, Ontario.

This was the sixth edition of the Canadian U18 Curling Championships. The inaugural edition was held in Moncton, New Brunswick in 2017 and was again held in New Brunswick in Saint Andrews in 2018. After the 2019 event in Sherwood Park, Alberta, the U18 nationals were cancelled in 2020 and 2021 due to the COVID-19 pandemic. The event returned in 2022 in Oakville, Ontario with an expanded field of twenty-one teams in each division and kept this same format for the 2023 championship in Timmins. The 2024 edition also used this twenty-one-team format, splitting the teams into three pools of seven. The top four teams from each pool at the end of the round robin advanced to the playoff round. Based on results from the 2022 and 2023 events, certain provinces earned two berths to the championship. On the boy's side, Alberta, Manitoba, New Brunswick, Newfoundland and Labrador, Northern Ontario, Nova Scotia, Ontario and Saskatchewan earned a second spot and in the girl's event, Alberta, British Columbia, New Brunswick, Newfoundland and Labrador, Northern Ontario, Nova Scotia, Ontario and Quebec got a second team.

== Medallists ==
Under-18	Gold	Silver	Bronze
Men	Newfoundland and Labrador 1 Simon Perry; Nicholas Codner; Brayden Snow; Carter Holden	Saskatchewan 1 Dylan Derksen; Logan Sawicki; Tyler Derksen; Gavin Martens	Nova Scotia 1 Zach Atherton; Alan Fawcett; Tyler McMullen; Brennan Smith
Women	Manitoba; Shaela Hayward; Keira Krahn; India Young; Rylie Cox	Quebec 1 Jolianne Fortin; Emy Lafrance; Megan Lafrance; Mégane Fortin	Ontario 2 Ava Acres; Aila Thompson; Isabella McLean; Mya Sharpe

== Men ==
=== Teams ===
The teams are listed as follows:

Province / Territory	Skip	Third	Second	Lead	Alternate	Club(s)
Alberta 1	Peter Hlushak	Lucas Sawiak	Noah Mason-Wood	Parker Harris	Rhett Whittmire	Crestwood CC, Edmonton
Alberta 2	Jaxon Hiebert	Evan Hennigar	Varyk Doepker	Nate Burton		Sherwood Park CC, Sherwood Park
British Columbia	Kaiden Beck	Ethan Chiu	Nolan Beck	Harrison Hrynew		Salmon Arm CC, Salmon Arm; Port Moody CC, Port Moody; Royal City CC, New Westminster; Vernon CC, Vernon
Manitoba 1	Rylan Campbell	Logan Zacharias	Nick Senff	Rylan Graham		Altona CC, Altona
Manitoba 2	Nash Sugden	Tyler Fehr	Tanner Treichel	Ryan Thiessen		Morden CC Morden
New Brunswick 1	Sahil Dalrymple	James Watson	Jayden Colwell	Ron-Allen Elsinga		Gage Golf & CC, Oromocto
New Brunswick 2	Michael Hughes	Graydon Andrew	Evan Hanson	Jack Hoyt		Capital WC, Fredericton; Gage Golf & CC, Oromocto; Thistle-St. Andrews CC, Saint John
Newfoundland and Labrador 1	Simon Perry	Nicholas Codner	Brayden Snow	Carter Holden		RE/MAX Centre, St. John's
Newfoundland and Labrador 2	Zachery French	Nathan Murphy	Lucas Wall	Noah Warren-Pitre	Winter Myron	RE/MAX Centre, St. John's
Northern Ontario 1	Kamdyn Julien	Derek Leonard	Landan Fleury	Felix Bonin-Ducharme		Horne Granite CC, Temiskaming Shores
Northern Ontario 2	Riley Winters	Wesley Decary	Grayson Gribbon	Josh Dumoulin	Aidan Baxter	North Bay GC, North Bay
Northwest Territories	Shawn Dragon	Sean Vermaak	John Voudrach	Ian Gau		Yellowknife CC, Yellowknife; Inuvik CC, Inuvik
Nova Scotia 1	Zach Atherton	Alan Fawcett	Tyler McMullen	Brennan Smith		Chester CC, Chester; Halifax CC, Halifax
Nova Scotia 2	Mark Strang	Izaac Hopper	Brett Carter	Ben Carlin		Lakeshore CC, Lower Sackville
Ontario 1	Tyler MacTavish	Evan Madore	Nathan Kim	Colsen Flemington	Evan MacDougall	KW Granite Club, Waterloo
Ontario 2	Owen Nicholls	Drew Zettler	Tye McCutcheon	Kole O'Connor	Dylan Stockton	Rideau CC, Ottawa
Prince Edward Island	Isaiah Dalton	Connor Bruce	Sheamus Herlihy	Nate MacRae		Cornwall CC, Cornwall
Quebec	Raphaël Tremblay	Mathis Arsenault	Thomas Lauzon	Justin Lapointe	Zachary Janidlo	CC Grand-Mère, Grand-Mère
Saskatchewan 1	Dylan Derksen	Logan Sawicki	Tyler Derksen	Gavin Martens		Martensville CC, Martensville
Saskatchewan 2	Rogan Snow	Nathan Roy	Luke Olson	Josh Lussier		Sutherland CC, Saskatoon
Yukon	Charles Snider	Nolan Floyd	Roman Snider	Savvas Lantzos		Whitehorse CC, Whitehorse

=== Round robin standings ===
Final Round Robin Standings

Key
Teams to Playoffs

Pool A	Skip	W	L
Saskatchewan 1	Dylan Derksen	5	1
Nova Scotia 1	Zach Atherton	5	1
Quebec	Raphaël Tremblay	4	2
Ontario 2	Owen Nicholls	3	3
Prince Edward Island	Isaiah Dalton	2	4
Northern Ontario 1	Kamdyn Julien	2	4
New Brunswick 2	Michael Hughes	0	6

Pool B	Skip	W	L
Newfoundland and Labrador 1	Simon Perry	5	1
Alberta 1	Peter Hlushak	4	2
Ontario 1	Tyler MacTavish	4	2
Saskatchewan 2	Rogan Snow	4	2
Manitoba 2	Nash Sugden	2	4
British Columbia	Kaiden Beck	2	4
Northwest Territories	Shawn Dragon	0	6

Pool C	Skip	W	L
New Brunswick 1	Sahil Dalrymple	5	1
Alberta 2	Jaxon Hiebert	5	1
Manitoba 1	Rylan Campbell	4	2
Northern Ontario 2	Riley Winters	3	3
Nova Scotia 2	Mark Strang	2	4
Yukon	Charles Snider	1	5
Newfoundland and Labrador 2	Zachery French	1	5

=== Round robin results ===
All draw times are listed in Eastern Time (UTC−05:00).

==== Draw 1 ====
Sunday, February 4, 9:30 am

Sheet A	1	2	3	4	5	6	7	8	Final
Nova Scotia 1 (Atherton)	0	0	3	0	0	0	4	X	7
Prince Edward Island (Dalton)	0	1	0	2	0	0	0	X	3

Sheet B	1	2	3	4	5	6	7	8	Final
Saskatchewan 1 (Derksen)	0	0	1	1	0	0	0	0	2
Quebec (Tremblay)	0	0	0	0	2	1	0	1	4

Sheet C	1	2	3	4	5	6	7	8	Final
Northern Ontario 1 (Julien)	0	0	0	0	1	0	2	0	3
Ontario 2 (Nicholls)	0	3	0	3	0	2	0	1	9

Sheet D	1	2	3	4	5	6	7	8	Final
Alberta 1 (Hlushak)	0	2	2	0	4	0	0	1	9
Northwest Territories (Dragon)	2	0	0	0	0	1	1	0	4

Sheet E	1	2	3	4	5	6	7	8	Final
New Brunswick 1 (Dalrymple)	1	0	0	1	1	0	2	0	5
Newfoundland and Labrador 2 (French)	0	1	0	0	0	1	0	0	2

Sheet F	1	2	3	4	5	6	7	8	Final
Newfoundland and Labrador 1 (Perry)	1	0	0	0	1	0	2	0	4
Saskatchewan 2 (Snow)	0	1	1	1	0	2	0	3	8

Sheet G	1	2	3	4	5	6	7	8	Final
Manitoba 1 (Campbell)	2	2	2	1	0	0	1	X	8
Yukon (Snider)	0	0	0	0	1	1	0	X	2

Sheet H	1	2	3	4	5	6	7	8	Final
Ontario 1 (MacTavish)	1	0	0	1	0	1	1	1	5
British Columbia (Beck)	0	0	3	0	1	0	0	0	4

Sheet I	1	2	3	4	5	6	7	8	Final
Nova Scotia 2 (Strang)	3	0	1	0	0	0	1	X	5
Northern Ontario 2 (Winters)	0	4	0	2	2	1	0	X	9

==== Draw 3 ====
Sunday, February 4, 7:30 pm

Sheet A	1	2	3	4	5	6	7	8	Final
Newfoundland and Labrador 2 (French)	0	1	2	0	3	0	0	2	8
Nova Scotia 2 (Strang)	0	0	0	2	0	3	0	0	5

Sheet B	1	2	3	4	5	6	7	8	Final
Northern Ontario 2 (Winters)	1	0	1	1	0	3	0	1	7
Yukon (Snider)	0	1	0	0	1	0	1	0	3

Sheet C	1	2	3	4	5	6	7	8	9	Final
Alberta 2 (Hiebert)	0	1	0	2	0	0	0	0	2	5
Manitoba 1 (Campbell)	0	0	1	0	0	0	1	1	0	3

Sheet D	1	2	3	4	5	6	7	8	Final
British Columbia (Beck)	0	0	2	0	1	0	X	X	3
Newfoundland and Labrador 1 (Perry)	5	0	0	1	0	3	X	X	9

Sheet E	1	2	3	4	5	6	7	8	Final
Saskatchewan 2 (Snow)	0	3	3	2	3	0	0	X	11
Northwest Territories (Dragon)	5	0	0	0	0	0	2	X	7

Sheet F	1	2	3	4	5	6	7	8	Final
Manitoba 2 (Sugden)	0	1	0	0	0	1	0	X	2
Alberta 1 (Hlushak)	2	0	2	1	0	0	1	X	6

Sheet G	1	2	3	4	5	6	7	8	Final
Quebec (Tremblay)	0	2	0	3	0	3	X	X	8
Northern Ontario 1 (Julien)	1	0	0	0	1	0	X	X	2

Sheet H	1	2	3	4	5	6	7	8	9	Final
Ontario 2 (Nicholls)	3	0	0	2	0	2	0	0	0	7
Prince Edward Island (Dalton)	0	1	1	0	1	0	3	1	1	8

Sheet I	1	2	3	4	5	6	7	8	Final
New Brunswick 2 (Hughes)	0	1	0	0	1	0	0	X	2
Nova Scotia 1 (Atherton)	1	0	2	1	0	0	2	X	6

==== Draw 5 ====
Monday, February 5, 2:00 pm

Sheet A	1	2	3	4	5	6	7	8	Final
New Brunswick 1 (Dalrymple)	1	0	3	1	0	2	1	X	8
Northern Ontario 2 (Winters)	0	0	0	0	1	0	0	X	1

Sheet B	1	2	3	4	5	6	7	8	Final
Newfoundland and Labrador 1 (Perry)	2	0	0	1	0	1	1	X	5
Manitoba 2 (Sugden)	0	1	1	0	1	0	0	X	3

Sheet C	1	2	3	4	5	6	7	8	Final
Ontario 1 (MacTavish)	3	5	0	0	2	0	3	X	13
Saskatchewan 2 (Snow)	0	0	2	1	0	3	0	X	6

Sheet D	1	2	3	4	5	6	7	8	Final
Quebec (Tremblay)	0	0	0	2	1	1	2	X	6
Prince Edward Island (Dalton)	1	0	0	0	0	0	0	X	1

Sheet E	1	2	3	4	5	6	7	8	Final
Northern Ontario 1 (Julien)	0	0	1	0	0	0	1	3	5
New Brunswick 2 (Hughes)	1	0	0	1	0	0	0	0	2

Sheet F	1	2	3	4	5	6	7	8	Final
Saskatchewan 1 (Derksen)	2	0	0	0	5	0	2	X	9
Ontario 2 (Nicholls)	0	0	1	1	0	2	0	X	4

Sheet G	1	2	3	4	5	6	7	8	Final
British Columbia (Beck)	2	1	3	0	1	2	X	X	9
Northwest Territories (Dragon)	0	0	0	1	0	0	X	X	1

Sheet H	1	2	3	4	5	6	7	8	Final
Nova Scotia 2 (Strang)	1	0	0	1	0	0	0	X	2
Alberta 2 (Hiebert)	0	0	1	0	3	0	0	X	4

Sheet I	1	2	3	4	5	6	7	8	9	Final
Newfoundland and Labrador 2 (French)	0	2	0	0	0	3	1	1	0	7
Yukon (Snider)	3	0	1	1	2	0	0	0	1	8

==== Draw 7 ====
Tuesday, February 6, 9:30 am

Sheet A	1	2	3	4	5	6	7	8	9	Final
Saskatchewan 1 (Derksen)	1	0	2	0	0	2	0	0	1	6
Northern Ontario 1 (Julien)	0	2	0	1	0	0	1	1	0	5

Sheet B	1	2	3	4	5	6	7	8	Final
Prince Edward Island (Dalton)	0	2	1	2	1	0	2	X	8
New Brunswick 2 (Hughes)	1	0	0	0	0	2	0	X	3

Sheet C	1	2	3	4	5	6	7	8	Final
Quebec (Tremblay)	0	0	2	0	2	0	1	0	5
Nova Scotia 1 (Atherton)	1	0	0	2	0	2	0	2	7

Sheet D	1	2	3	4	5	6	7	8	Final
New Brunswick 1 (Dalrymple)	0	0	2	0	0	0	0	X	2
Nova Scotia 2 (Strang)	3	1	0	1	2	1	2	X	10

Sheet E	1	2	3	4	5	6	7	8	Final
Yukon (Snider)	0	0	0	0	1	0	0	X	1
Alberta 2 (Hiebert)	4	0	2	1	0	2	3	X	12

Sheet F	1	2	3	4	5	6	7	8	Final
Newfoundland and Labrador 2 (French)	2	1	0	0	1	0	2	0	6
Manitoba 1 (Campbell)	0	0	0	2	0	3	0	3	8

Sheet G	1	2	3	4	5	6	7	8	Final
Ontario 1 (MacTavish)	2	0	1	0	0	0	3	0	6
Newfoundland and Labrador 1 (Perry)	0	1	0	3	1	2	0	2	9

Sheet H	1	2	3	4	5	6	7	8	Final
Northwest Territories (Dragon)	0	3	1	0	0	0	0	0	4
Manitoba 2 (Sugden)	2	0	0	4	1	0	3	0	10

Sheet I	1	2	3	4	5	6	7	8	Final
British Columbia (Beck)	1	0	0	1	0	2	1	1	6
Alberta 1 (Hlushak)	0	2	1	0	1	0	0	0	4

==== Draw 9 ====
Tuesday, February 6, 6:30 pm

Sheet A	1	2	3	4	5	6	7	8	Final
Northern Ontario 2 (Winters)	0	1	0	1	0	0	1	X	3
Alberta 2 (Hiebert)	1	0	2	0	3	1	0	X	7

Sheet B	1	2	3	4	5	6	7	8	Final
Manitoba 1 (Campbell)	0	1	0	0	1	0	2	0	4
New Brunswick 1 (Dalrymple)	2	0	1	0	0	3	0	1	7

Sheet C	1	2	3	4	5	6	7	8	Final
Yukon (Snider)	0	0	0	1	0	1	X	X	2
Nova Scotia 2 (Strang)	2	3	1	0	4	0	X	X	10

Sheet D	1	2	3	4	5	6	7	8	Final
Ontario 2 (Nicholls)	2	0	0	3	0	1	0	1	7
New Brunswick 2 (Hughes)	0	2	1	0	1	0	2	0	6

Sheet E	1	2	3	4	5	6	7	8	Final
Nova Scotia 1 (Atherton)	1	0	1	0	0	1	0	1	4
Saskatchewan 1 (Derksen)	0	2	0	1	0	0	2	0	5

Sheet F	1	2	3	4	5	6	7	8	Final
Prince Edward Island (Dalton)	2	0	0	0	1	0	0	X	3
Northern Ontario 1 (Julien)	0	2	1	1	0	1	1	X	6

Sheet G	1	2	3	4	5	6	7	8	Final
Saskatchewan 2 (Snow)	3	0	0	3	2	0	X	X	8
Manitoba 2 (Sugden)	0	0	1	0	0	1	X	X	2

Sheet H	1	2	3	4	5	6	7	8	Final
Alberta 1 (Hlushak)	4	1	0	0	0	2	0	0	7
Ontario 1 (MacTavish)	0	0	3	1	1	0	1	0	6

Sheet I	1	2	3	4	5	6	7	8	Final
Northwest Territories (Dragon)	0	0	0	0	0	0	X	X	0
Newfoundland and Labrador 1 (Perry)	4	1	1	2	0	1	X	X	9

==== Draw 11 ====
Wednesday, February 7, 2:00 pm

Sheet A	1	2	3	4	5	6	7	8	Final
Alberta 1 (Hlushak)	3	0	0	0	3	1	0	X	7
Saskatchewan 2 (Snow)	0	2	0	0	0	0	2	X	4

Sheet B	1	2	3	4	5	6	7	8	Final
Northwest Territories (Dragon)	0	0	0	0	0	0	1	X	1
Ontario 1 (MacTavish)	2	2	0	1	1	0	0	X	6

Sheet C	1	2	3	4	5	6	7	8	Final
Manitoba 2 (Sugden)	1	0	2	2	1	0	1	X	7
British Columbia (Beck)	0	1	0	0	0	3	0	X	4

Sheet D	1	2	3	4	5	6	7	8	Final
Manitoba 1 (Campbell)	2	2	2	0	4	0	X	X	10
Northern Ontario 2 (Winters)	0	0	0	1	0	1	X	X	2

Sheet E	1	2	3	4	5	6	7	8	Final
Alberta 2 (Hiebert)	0	3	0	0	2	0	0	1	6
Newfoundland and Labrador 2 (French)	1	0	0	1	0	0	2	0	4

Sheet F	1	2	3	4	5	6	7	8	Final
Yukon (Snider)	0	3	0	0	0	0	0	X	3
New Brunswick 1 (Dalrymple)	2	0	0	3	2	2	2	X	11

Sheet G	1	2	3	4	5	6	7	8	Final
Nova Scotia 1 (Atherton)	0	2	0	5	0	1	0	0	8
Ontario 2 (Nicholls)	1	0	2	0	1	0	1	2	7

Sheet H	1	2	3	4	5	6	7	8	9	Final
New Brunswick 2 (Hughes)	1	0	1	2	0	0	0	1	0	5
Quebec (Tremblay)	0	1	0	0	1	3	0	0	1	6

Sheet I	1	2	3	4	5	6	7	8	Final
Prince Edward Island (Dalton)	0	0	0	1	1	0	0	X	2
Saskatchewan 1 (Derksen)	1	2	1	0	0	2	3	X	9

==== Draw 13 ====
Thursday, February 8, 8:30 am

Sheet A	1	2	3	4	5	6	7	8	Final
Ontario 2 (Nicholls)	1	0	0	0	2	1	0	1	5
Quebec (Tremblay)	0	0	1	1	0	0	2	0	4

Sheet B	1	2	3	4	5	6	7	8	Final
Saskatchewan 2 (Snow)	2	1	0	3	2	0	3	X	11
British Columbia (Beck)	0	0	1	0	0	3	0	X	4

Sheet C	1	2	3	4	5	6	7	8	9	Final
Newfoundland and Labrador 1 (Perry)	0	0	0	2	0	3	0	0	2	7
Alberta 1 (Hlushak)	1	0	0	0	2	0	0	2	0	5

Sheet D	1	2	3	4	5	6	7	8	9	Final
Manitoba 2 (Sugden)	0	1	0	0	2	0	1	1	0	5
Ontario 1 (MacTavish)	2	0	1	0	0	2	0	0	1	6

Sheet E	1	2	3	4	5	6	7	8	Final
Nova Scotia 2 (Strang)	2	0	0	0	0	0	X	X	2
Manitoba 1 (Campbell)	0	3	4	4	1	2	X	X	14

Sheet F	1	2	3	4	5	6	7	8	Final
New Brunswick 2 (Hughes)	0	0	0	0	0	1	X	X	1
Saskatchewan 1 (Derksen)	0	2	1	1	3	0	X	X	7

Sheet G	1	2	3	4	5	6	7	8	Final
Alberta 2 (Hiebert)	0	1	0	1	0	1	0	0	3
New Brunswick 1 (Dalrymple)	2	0	1	0	1	0	1	1	6

Sheet H	1	2	3	4	5	6	7	8	Final
Northern Ontario 1 (Julien)	0	0	0	1	1	0	0	X	2
Nova Scotia 1 (Atherton)	2	1	4	0	0	1	2	X	10

Sheet I	1	2	3	4	5	6	7	8	Final
Northern Ontario 2 (Winters)	2	0	1	0	0	0	4	X	7
Newfoundland and Labrador 2 (French)	0	2	0	1	0	0	0	X	3

=== Playoffs ===
Qualification Games
8	Manitoba 1	1
9	Ontario 1	10
5	Nova Scotia 1	8
12	Northern Ontario 2	7
6	Alberta 1	6
11	Ontario 2	5
7	Quebec	7
10	Saskatchewan 2	6

Quarterfinals
1	Saskatchewan 1	7
9	Ontario 1	6
4	Alberta 2	5
5	Nova Scotia 1	7
3	Newfoundland and Labrador 1	7
6	Alberta 1	1
2	New Brunswick 1	6
7	Quebec	7

Semifinals
1	Saskatchewan 1	11
5	Nova Scotia 1	3
3	Newfoundland and Labrador 1	9
7	Quebec	4

Final
1	Saskatchewan 1	4
3	Newfoundland and Labrador 1	5

==== Qualification games ====
Thursday, February 8, 4:30 pm

Sheet A	1	2	3	4	5	6	7	8	Final
Manitoba 1 (Campbell)	0	0	0	0	1	0	X	X	1
Ontario 1 (MacTavish)	1	2	1	2	0	4	X	X	10

Sheet B	1	2	3	4	5	6	7	8	9	Final
Nova Scotia 1 (Atherton)	0	3	0	2	0	2	0	0	1	8
Northern Ontario 2 (Winters)	2	0	3	0	1	0	0	1	0	7

Sheet C	1	2	3	4	5	6	7	8	Final
Alberta 1 (Hlushak)	1	0	1	0	0	3	0	1	6
Ontario 2 (Nicholls)	0	2	0	1	0	0	2	0	5

Sheet H	1	2	3	4	5	6	7	8	9	Final
Quebec (Tremblay)	0	1	0	1	0	2	0	2	1	7
Saskatchewan 2 (Snow)	3	0	0	0	2	0	1	0	0	6

==== Quarterfinals ====
Friday, February 9, 8:30 am

Sheet A	1	2	3	4	5	6	7	8	Final
Newfoundland and Labrador 1 (Perry)	2	2	1	0	1	1	X	X	7
Alberta 1 (Hlushak)	0	0	0	1	0	0	X	X	1

Sheet B	1	2	3	4	5	6	7	8	9	Final
Saskatchewan 1 (Derksen)	0	3	1	0	1	0	1	0	1	7
Ontario 1 (MacTavish)	1	0	0	1	0	3	0	1	0	6

Sheet C	1	2	3	4	5	6	7	8	Final
New Brunswick 1 (Dalrymple)	0	3	0	0	1	0	2	0	6
Quebec (Tremblay)	1	0	1	1	0	2	0	2	7

Sheet H	1	2	3	4	5	6	7	8	Final
Alberta 2 (Hiebert)	0	2	1	0	1	0	0	1	5
Nova Scotia 1 (Atherton)	2	0	0	4	0	1	0	0	7

==== Semifinals ====
Friday, February 9, 4:30 pm

Sheet B	1	2	3	4	5	6	7	8	Final
Newfoundland and Labrador 1 (Perry)	0	2	0	5	0	2	X	X	9
Quebec (Tremblay)	1	0	2	0	1	0	X	X	4

Sheet D	1	2	3	4	5	6	7	8	Final
Saskatchewan 1 (Derksen)	0	0	3	0	3	5	X	X	11
Nova Scotia 1 (Atherton)	0	1	0	2	0	0	X	X	3

==== Final ====
Saturday, February 10, 12:30 pm

Sheet C	1	2	3	4	5	6	7	8	Final
Saskatchewan 1 (Derksen)	0	1	0	0	1	0	1	1	4
Newfoundland and Labrador 1 (Perry)	0	0	0	3	0	2	0	0	5

=== Consolation ===
==== A Bracket ====
For Seeds 3 to 8

Bronze medal game
5	Nova Scotia 1	9
7	Quebec	2

5th/6th
9	Ontario 1	4
4	Alberta 2	7
4	Alberta 2	7
6	Alberta 1	3
6	Alberta 1	7
2	New Brunswick 1	5

==== B Bracket ====
For Seeds 9 to 12

9th/10th
8	Manitoba 1	8
12	Northern Ontario 2	5
8	Manitoba 1	6
11	Ontario 2	5
11	Ontario 2	9
10	Saskatchewan 2	3

==== C Bracket ====
For Seeds 13 to 15

Team	Skip	W	L	PF	PA
Prince Edward Island	Isaiah Dalton	2	0	15	12
Nova Scotia 2	Mark Strang	1	1	14	14
Manitoba 2	Nash Sugden	0	2	8	11

==== D Bracket ====
For Seeds 16 to 18

Team	Skip	W	L	PF	PA
British Columbia	Kaiden Beck	2	0	18	11
Northern Ontario 1	Kamdyn Julien	1	1	17	15
Yukon	Charles Snider	0	2	9	18

==== E Bracket ====
For Seeds 19 to 21

Team	Skip	W	L	PF	PA
Newfoundland and Labrador 2	Zachery French	2	0	14	9
New Brunswick 2	Michael Hughes	1	1	16	8
Northwest Territories	Shawn Dragon	0	2	5	18

=== Final standings ===
Place	Team
1st place, gold medalist(s)	Newfoundland and Labrador 1
2nd place, silver medalist(s)	Saskatchewan 1
3rd place, bronze medalist(s)	Nova Scotia 1
4	Quebec
5	Alberta 2
6	Alberta 1
7	New Brunswick 1
8	Ontario 1
9	Manitoba 1
10	Ontario 2
11	Saskatchewan 2
12	Northern Ontario 2
13	Prince Edward Island
14	Nova Scotia 2
15	Manitoba 2
16	British Columbia
17	Northern Ontario 1
18	Yukon
19	Newfoundland and Labrador 2
20	New Brunswick 2
21	Northwest Territories

== Women ==
=== Teams ===
The teams are listed as follows:

Province / Territory	Skip	Third	Second	Lead	Alternate	Club(s)
Alberta 1	Emma DeSchiffart	Emma Yarmuch	Morgan DeSchiffart	Sarah Yarmuch	Rhiley DeSchiffart	Lacombe CC, Lacombe
Alberta 2	Abby Whitbread	Anna Bakos	Hayley Adams	Faith Thomas		Lacombe CC, Lacombe
British Columbia 1	Erin Fitzgibbon	Morgan Bowles	Ashley Fenton	Bryelle Wong	Ella Wang	Royal City CC, New Westminster
British Columbia 2	Megan Rempel	Parker Rempel	Gwyneth Jones	Ella Walker		Kelowna CC, Kelowna
Manitoba	Shaela Hayward	Keira Krahn	India Young	Rylie Cox		Carman CC, Carman
New Brunswick 1	Mya Pugsley	Mia West	Hannah Williams	Ashley Siddall		Curl Moncton, Moncton
New Brunswick 2	Maizie Carter	Avery Colwell	Gabrielle King	Genevieve Mason		Gage Golf & CC, Oromocto
Newfoundland and Labrador 1	Cailey Locke	Hayley Gushue	Sitaye Penney	Marissa Gushue		RE/MAX Centre, St. John's
Newfoundland and Labrador 2	Hannah Connolly	Megan Blandford	Kiersten Devereaux	Katarina Smith		RE/MAX Centre, St. John's
Northern Ontario 1	Claire Dubinsky	Rylie Paul	Bella McCarville	Lily Ariganello		Kakabeka Falls CC, Kakabeka Falls
Northern Ontario 2	Kameron Tellier	Kelton Tellier	Samantha Digiglio	Karleigh McNaughton	Giliane Nadon	Idylwylde G&CC, Sudbury
Northwest Territories	Reese Wainman	Alex Testart-Campbell	Brooke Smith	Tamara Bain		Inuvik CC, Inuvik
Nova Scotia 1	Rebecca Regan	Olivia McDonah	MacKenzie Hiltz	Ella Kinley		Lakeshore CC, Lower Sackville
Nova Scotia 2	Cassidy Blades	Stephanie Atherton	Kate Weissent	Anna MacNutt		Truro CC, Truro
Ontario 1	Dominique Vivier	Brooklyn Ideson	Toula Pappas	Sydney Anderson	Katrina Frlan	Ottawa Hunt & GC, Ottawa
Ontario 2	Ava Acres	Aila Thompson	Isabella McLean	Mya Sharpe		RCMP CC, Ottawa
Prince Edward Island	Ella Lenentine	Makiya Noonan	Reid Hart	Erika Pater		Summerside CC, Summerside; Cornwall CC, Cornwall
Quebec 1	Jolianne Fortin	Emy Lafrance	Megan Lafrance	Mégane Fortin		CC Kénogami, Jonquière
Quebec 2	Sarah Bergeron (Fourth)	Léanne Fortin (Skip)	Juliette Bergeron	Emmy Bélanger	Gabryelle Sasseville	CC Riverbend, Alma; CC Opémiska, Chapais
Saskatchewan	Shawna Simpson	Lauren Speidel	Makena Bailey	Katelyn Speidel		Highland CC, Regina
Yukon	Hadley Callan	Chloe Searson	Linnaya Searson	Lucy Epp		Whitehorse CC, Whitehorse

=== Round robin standings ===
Final Round Robin Standings

Key
Teams to Playoffs

Pool A	Skip	W	L
Ontario 2	Ava Acres	5	1
Alberta 1	Emma DeSchiffart	4	2
New Brunswick 1	Mya Pugsley	4	2
Northern Ontario 1	Claire Dubinsky	3	3
New Brunswick 2	Maizie Carter	2	4
Saskatchewan	Shawna Simpson	2	4
Northwest Territories	Reese Wainman	1	5

Pool B	Skip	W	L
Ontario 1	Dominique Vivier	6	0
Alberta 2	Abby Whitbread	4	2
British Columbia 1	Erin Fitzgibbon	4	2
Quebec 2	Léanne Fortin	3	3
Northern Ontario 2	Kameron Tellier	2	4
Prince Edward Island	Ella Lenentine	2	4
Yukon	Hadley Callan	0	6

Pool C	Skip	W	L
Nova Scotia 1	Rebecca Regan	6	0
Manitoba	Shaela Hayward	4	2
Quebec 1	Jolianne Fortin	4	2
Nova Scotia 2	Cassidy Blades	3	3
Newfoundland and Labrador 1	Cailey Locke	3	3
British Columbia 2	Megan Rempel	1	5
Newfoundland and Labrador 2	Hannah Connolly	0	6

=== Round robin results ===
All draw times are listed in Eastern Time (UTC−05:00).

==== Draw 2 ====
Sunday, February 4, 2:00 pm

Sheet A	1	2	3	4	5	6	7	8	Final
Alberta 1 (DeSchiffart)	0	3	0	2	0	2	1	X	8
Northwest Territories (Wainman)	0	0	1	0	1	0	0	X	2

Sheet B	1	2	3	4	5	6	7	8	Final
New Brunswick 1 (Pugsley)	0	0	0	3	1	1	0	1	6
Saskatchewan (Simpson)	1	0	0	0	0	0	2	0	3

Sheet C	1	2	3	4	5	6	7	8	Final
Northern Ontario 1 (Dubinsky)	0	2	0	0	0	2	3	0	7
New Brunswick 2 (Carter)	0	0	2	1	1	0	0	1	5

Sheet D	1	2	3	4	5	6	7	8	Final
British Columbia 1 (Fitzgibbon)	3	3	0	2	1	4	X	X	13
Yukon (Callan)	0	0	1	0	0	0	X	X	1

Sheet E	1	2	3	4	5	6	7	8	9	Final
Ontario 1 (Vivier)	0	1	0	2	0	0	0	2	2	7
Prince Edward Island (Lenentine)	0	0	1	0	2	0	2	0	0	5

Sheet F	1	2	3	4	5	6	7	8	Final
Alberta 2 (Whitbread)	1	0	0	3	0	0	2	2	8
Northern Ontario 2 (Tellier)	0	1	1	0	2	1	0	0	5

Sheet G	1	2	3	4	5	6	7	8	Final
Nova Scotia 1 (Regan)	3	0	2	1	1	2	X	X	9
Newfoundland and Labrador 2 (Connolly)	0	2	0	0	0	0	X	X	2

Sheet H	1	2	3	4	5	6	7	8	Final
Quebec 1 (J. Fortin)	0	2	1	0	1	0	0	0	4
Manitoba (Hayward)	1	0	0	3	0	1	1	2	8

Sheet I	1	2	3	4	5	6	7	8	Final
British Columbia 2 (Rempel)	0	1	0	0	0	0	2	X	3
Newfoundland and Labrador 1 (Locke)	2	0	1	2	2	1	0	X	8

==== Draw 4 ====
Monday, February 5, 9:30 am

Sheet A	1	2	3	4	5	6	7	8	Final
Manitoba (Hayward)	0	0	4	3	1	1	X	X	9
British Columbia 2 (Rempel)	0	1	0	0	0	0	X	X	1

Sheet B	1	2	3	4	5	6	7	8	Final
Newfoundland and Labrador 1 (Locke)	3	3	3	0	5	5	X	X	19
Newfoundland and Labrador 2 (Connolly)	0	0	0	1	0	0	X	X	1

Sheet C	1	2	3	4	5	6	7	8	Final
Nova Scotia 2 (Blades)	1	0	3	0	0	0	0	X	4
Nova Scotia 1 (Regan)	0	2	0	1	2	2	1	X	8

Sheet D	1	2	3	4	5	6	7	8	Final
Prince Edward Island (Lenentine)	1	0	0	1	0	0	0	2	4
Alberta 2 (Whitbread)	0	0	0	0	0	3	0	0	3

Sheet E	1	2	3	4	5	6	7	8	Final
Northern Ontario 2 (Tellier)	5	1	2	5	3	1	X	X	17
Yukon (Callan)	0	0	0	0	0	0	X	X	0

Sheet F	1	2	3	4	5	6	7	8	Final
Quebec 2 (L. Fortin)	1	0	1	0	2	0	1	0	5
British Columbia 1 (Fitzgibbon)	0	2	0	1	0	2	0	1	6

Sheet G	1	2	3	4	5	6	7	8	Final
Saskatchewan (Simpson)	0	1	0	0	2	0	0	X	3
Northern Ontario 1 (Dubinsky)	0	0	1	1	0	2	2	X	6

Sheet H	1	2	3	4	5	6	7	8	Final
New Brunswick 2 (Carter)	1	0	1	3	5	3	X	X	13
Northwest Territories (Wainman)	0	1	0	0	0	0	X	X	1

Sheet I	1	2	3	4	5	6	7	8	Final
Ontario 2 (Acres)	1	0	0	0	1	1	1	1	5
Alberta 1 (DeSchiffart)	0	2	1	1	0	0	0	0	4

==== Draw 6 ====
Monday, February 5, 6:30 pm

Sheet A	1	2	3	4	5	6	7	8	Final
Prince Edward Island (Lenentine)	0	0	5	3	4	4	X	X	16
Yukon (Callan)	1	1	0	0	0	0	X	X	2

Sheet B	1	2	3	4	5	6	7	8	Final
Alberta 2 (Whitbread)	1	0	0	4	0	0	1	0	6
Quebec 2 (L. Fortin)	0	1	0	0	1	1	0	1	4

Sheet C	1	2	3	4	5	6	7	8	Final
Ontario 1 (Vivier)	1	0	1	0	1	3	3	X	9
Northern Ontario 2 (Tellier)	0	1	0	1	0	0	0	X	2

Sheet D	1	2	3	4	5	6	7	8	Final
Saskatchewan (Simpson)	0	0	0	0	2	0	1	1	4
Northwest Territories (Wainman)	1	0	1	0	0	0	0	0	2

Sheet E	1	2	3	4	5	6	7	8	Final
Northern Ontario 1 (Dubinsky)	0	0	0	0	1	0	X	X	1
Ontario 2 (Acres)	0	3	2	0	0	4	X	X	9

Sheet F	1	2	3	4	5	6	7	8	Final
New Brunswick 1 (Pugsley)	1	0	1	0	1	1	0	3	7
New Brunswick 2 (Carter)	0	2	0	1	0	0	3	0	6

Sheet G	1	2	3	4	5	6	7	8	Final
Quebec 1 (J. Fortin)	1	2	0	5	0	0	2	X	10
Newfoundland and Labrador 1 (Locke)	0	0	1	0	3	1	0	X	5

Sheet H	1	2	3	4	5	6	7	8	Final
British Columbia 2 (Rempel)	0	1	0	0	1	1	2	X	5
Nova Scotia 2 (Blades)	2	0	3	3	0	0	0	X	8

Sheet I	1	2	3	4	5	6	7	8	Final
Manitoba (Hayward)	0	2	3	0	2	2	0	X	9
Newfoundland and Labrador 2 (Connolly)	1	0	0	2	0	0	1	X	4

==== Draw 8 ====
Tuesday, February 6, 2:00 pm

Sheet A	1	2	3	4	5	6	7	8	Final
New Brunswick 1 (Pugsley)	0	0	2	0	0	2	0	1	5
Northern Ontario 1 (Dubinsky)	0	1	0	1	1	0	0	0	3

Sheet B	1	2	3	4	5	6	7	8	Final
Northwest Territories (Wainman)	0	2	0	0	1	1	0	X	4
Ontario 2 (Acres)	5	0	0	1	0	0	2	X	8

Sheet C	1	2	3	4	5	6	7	8	Final
Saskatchewan (Simpson)	0	0	1	1	0	1	0	2	5
Alberta 1 (DeSchiffart)	0	2	0	0	1	0	1	0	4

Sheet D	1	2	3	4	5	6	7	8	Final
Quebec 1 (J. Fortin)	0	0	2	3	1	2	0	X	8
British Columbia 2 (Rempel)	2	0	0	0	0	0	1	X	3

Sheet E	1	2	3	4	5	6	7	8	Final
Manitoba (Hayward)	1	0	0	1	0	0	3	0	5
Nova Scotia 1 (Regan)	0	2	1	0	2	1	0	2	8

Sheet F	1	2	3	4	5	6	7	8	Final
Newfoundland and Labrador 2 (Connolly)	0	1	0	0	0	1	X	X	2
Nova Scotia 2 (Blades)	5	0	2	0	6	0	X	X	13

Sheet G	1	2	3	4	5	6	7	8	9	Final
Ontario 1 (Vivier)	0	0	2	0	1	1	0	0	1	5
Alberta 2 (Whitbread)	0	2	0	0	0	0	1	1	0	4

Sheet H	1	2	3	4	5	6	7	8	Final
Yukon (Callan)	0	0	0	0	0	0	X	X	0
Quebec 2 (L. Fortin)	3	5	1	1	5	6	X	X	21

Sheet I	1	2	3	4	5	6	7	8	Final
Prince Edward Island (Lenentine)	0	0	0	1	0	0	2	0	3
British Columbia 1 (Fitzgibbon)	0	0	1	0	1	2	0	1	5

==== Draw 10 ====
Wednesday, February 7, 9:30 am

Sheet A	1	2	3	4	5	6	7	8	Final
Newfoundland and Labrador 1 (Locke)	0	0	1	1	0	0	1	0	3
Nova Scotia 2 (Blades)	0	2	0	0	1	1	0	4	8

Sheet B	1	2	3	4	5	6	7	8	Final
Nova Scotia 1 (Regan)	0	1	0	1	2	0	3	X	7
Quebec 1 (J. Fortin)	0	0	1	0	0	2	0	X	3

Sheet C	1	2	3	4	5	6	7	8	Final
Newfoundland and Labrador 2 (Connolly)	0	1	0	1	0	1	0	X	3
British Columbia 2 (Rempel)	2	0	4	0	3	0	2	X	11

Sheet D	1	2	3	4	5	6	7	8	Final
New Brunswick 2 (Carter)	1	1	1	1	0	0	1	0	5
Ontario 2 (Acres)	0	0	0	0	3	1	0	3	7

Sheet E	1	2	3	4	5	6	7	8	Final
Alberta 1 (DeSchiffart)	1	0	0	2	0	2	0	1	6
New Brunswick 1 (Pugsley)	0	0	1	0	1	0	2	0	4

Sheet F	1	2	3	4	5	6	7	8	Final
Northwest Territories (Wainman)	0	0	1	0	0	0	X	X	1
Northern Ontario 1 (Dubinsky)	2	0	0	3	2	1	X	X	8

Sheet G	1	2	3	4	5	6	7	8	Final
Northern Ontario 2 (Tellier)	1	0	0	2	0	0	0	X	3
Quebec 2 (L. Fortin)	0	3	1	0	3	1	2	X	10

Sheet H	1	2	3	4	5	6	7	8	Final
British Columbia 1 (Fitzgibbon)	0	0	2	0	0	0	0	X	2
Ontario 1 (Vivier)	0	2	0	0	1	2	3	X	8

Sheet I	1	2	3	4	5	6	7	8	Final
Yukon (Callan)	0	0	1	0	0	0	0	0	1
Alberta 2 (Whitbread)	3	3	0	3	2	3	2	6	22

==== Draw 12 ====
Wednesday, February 7, 6:30 pm

Sheet A	1	2	3	4	5	6	7	8	Final
British Columbia 1 (Fitzgibbon)	2	0	0	3	0	0	0	1	6
Northern Ontario 2 (Tellier)	0	2	0	0	0	1	1	0	4

Sheet B	1	2	3	4	5	6	7	8	Final
Yukon (Callan)	0	0	0	0	0	0	X	X	0
Ontario 1 (Vivier)	3	1	4	1	5	2	X	X	16

Sheet C	1	2	3	4	5	6	7	8	Final
Quebec 2 (L. Fortin)	0	0	0	0	0	0	2	2	4
Prince Edward Island (Lenentine)	0	0	0	0	1	1	0	0	2

Sheet D	1	2	3	4	5	6	7	8	Final
Newfoundland and Labrador 2 (Connolly)	0	0	0	3	0	0	1	X	4
Quebec 1 (J. Fortin)	0	2	3	0	3	2	0	X	10

Sheet E	1	2	3	4	5	6	7	8	Final
Nova Scotia 1 (Regan)	0	1	0	2	0	3	1	1	8
Newfoundland and Labrador 1 (Locke)	3	0	2	0	1	0	0	0	6

Sheet F	1	2	3	4	5	6	7	8	Final
Nova Scotia 2 (Blades)	2	0	0	1	0	0	0	X	3
Manitoba (Hayward)	0	1	2	0	2	0	1	X	6

Sheet G	1	2	3	4	5	6	7	8	Final
Alberta 1 (DeSchiffart)	3	3	0	2	0	0	1	X	9
New Brunswick 2 (Carter)	0	0	1	0	1	1	0	X	3

Sheet H	1	2	3	4	5	6	7	8	Final
Ontario 2 (Acres)	0	1	2	0	0	2	0	X	5
Saskatchewan (Simpson)	0	0	0	2	1	0	1	X	4

Sheet I	1	2	3	4	5	6	7	8	Final
Northwest Territories (Wainman)	1	0	0	0	2	0	1	1	5
New Brunswick 1 (Pugsley)	0	1	1	1	0	1	0	0	4

==== Draw 14 ====
Thursday, February 8, 12:30 pm

Sheet A	1	2	3	4	5	6	7	8	Final
Quebec 2 (L. Fortin)	0	0	0	2	0	1	1	0	4
Ontario 1 (Vivier)	0	1	1	0	3	0	0	1	6

Sheet B	1	2	3	4	5	6	7	8	Final
Newfoundland and Labrador 1 (Locke)	0	0	2	3	0	0	4	X	9
Manitoba (Hayward)	0	1	0	0	1	1	0	X	3

Sheet C	1	2	3	4	5	6	7	8	Final
New Brunswick 2 (Carter)	0	0	0	1	1	2	0	1	5
Saskatchewan (Simpson)	1	0	0	0	0	0	3	0	4

Sheet D	1	2	3	4	5	6	7	8	Final
Alberta 2 (Whitbread)	2	0	1	2	1	0	3	X	9
British Columbia 1 (Fitzgibbon)	0	1	0	0	0	1	0	X	2

Sheet E	1	2	3	4	5	6	7	8	Final
Nova Scotia 2 (Blades)	1	0	0	0	2	0	X	X	3
Quebec 1 (J. Fortin)	0	1	3	1	0	5	X	X	10

Sheet F	1	2	3	4	5	6	7	8	Final
Ontario 2 (Acres)	0	2	1	1	0	1	0	0	5
New Brunswick 1 (Pugsley)	1	0	0	0	2	0	2	1	6

Sheet G	1	2	3	4	5	6	7	8	Final
British Columbia 2 (Rempel)	0	0	0	0	0	2	0	X	2
Nova Scotia 1 (Regan)	3	1	1	1	1	0	0	X	7

Sheet H	1	2	3	4	5	6	7	8	Final
Northern Ontario 1 (Dubinsky)	0	0	1	0	2	0	2	1	6
Alberta 1 (DeSchiffart)	0	2	0	1	0	4	0	0	7

Sheet I	1	2	3	4	5	6	7	8	Final
Northern Ontario 2 (Tellier)	0	3	0	2	0	1	0	2	8
Prince Edward Island (Lenentine)	2	0	1	0	2	0	2	0	7

=== Playoffs ===
Qualification Games
8	British Columbia 1	6
9	New Brunswick 1	4
5	Manitoba	8
12	Quebec 2	1
6	Alberta 2	9
11	Northern Ontario 1	7
7	Quebec 1	10
10	Nova Scotia 2	2

Quarterfinals
1	Nova Scotia 1	11
8	British Columbia 1	4
4	Alberta 1	5
5	Manitoba	6
3	Ontario 2	7
6	Alberta 2	3
2	Ontario 1	5
7	Quebec 1	6

Semifinals
1	Nova Scotia 1	2
5	Manitoba	4
3	Ontario 2	1
7	Quebec 1	8

Final
5	Manitoba	8
7	Quebec 1	5

==== Qualification games ====
Thursday, February 8, 8:30 pm

Sheet A	1	2	3	4	5	6	7	8	Final
British Columbia 1 (Fitzgibbon)	2	0	0	1	0	2	0	1	6
New Brunswick 1 (Pugsley)	0	1	1	0	0	0	2	0	4

Sheet B	1	2	3	4	5	6	7	8	Final
Manitoba (Hayward)	1	1	1	4	0	1	X	X	8
Quebec 2 (L. Fortin)	0	0	0	0	1	0	X	X	1

Sheet C	1	2	3	4	5	6	7	8	Final
Alberta 2 (Whitbread)	4	0	3	0	0	2	0	0	9
Northern Ontario 1 (Dubinsky)	0	2	0	1	1	0	2	1	7

Sheet H	1	2	3	4	5	6	7	8	Final
Quebec 1 (J. Fortin)	1	0	5	0	2	2	X	X	10
Nova Scotia 2 (Blades)	0	1	0	1	0	0	X	X	2

==== Quarterfinals ====
Friday, February 9, 12:30 pm

Sheet B	1	2	3	4	5	6	7	8	Final
Nova Scotia 1 (Regan)	3	2	2	0	4	0	X	X	11
British Columbia 1 (Fitzgibbon)	0	0	0	2	0	2	X	X	4

Sheet C	1	2	3	4	5	6	7	8	Final
Ontario 1 (Vivier)	2	0	1	1	0	0	1	0	5
Quebec 1 (J. Fortin)	0	1	0	0	2	2	0	1	6

Sheet F	1	2	3	4	5	6	7	8	Final
Ontario 2 (Acres)	0	2	0	1	3	0	1	X	7
Alberta 2 (Whitbread)	0	0	1	0	0	2	0	X	3

Sheet H	1	2	3	4	5	6	7	8	Final
Alberta 1 (DeSchiffart)	1	0	3	0	1	0	0	0	5
Manitoba (Hayward)	0	2	0	1	0	1	1	1	6

==== Semifinals ====
Friday, February 9, 8:30 pm

Sheet B	1	2	3	4	5	6	7	8	Final
Ontario 2 (Acres)	0	0	0	0	0	1	0	X	1
Quebec 1 (J. Fortin)	1	0	3	2	1	0	1	X	8

Sheet D	1	2	3	4	5	6	7	8	Final
Nova Scotia 1 (Regan)	0	1	0	1	0	0	0	0	2
Manitoba (Hayward)	0	0	1	0	1	1	0	1	4

==== Final ====
Saturday, February 10, 4:30 pm

Sheet C	1	2	3	4	5	6	7	8	Final
Manitoba (Hayward)	3	0	4	0	0	1	0	X	8
Quebec 1 (J. Fortin)	0	2	0	1	0	0	2	X	5

=== Consolation ===
==== A Bracket ====
For Seeds 3 to 8

Bronze medal game
1	Nova Scotia 1	5
3	Ontario 2	6

5th/6th
8	British Columbia 1	7
4	Alberta 1	3
8	British Columbia 1	4
6	Alberta 2	7
6	Alberta 2	7
2	Ontario 1	6

==== B Bracket ====
For Seeds 9 to 12

9th/10th
9	New Brunswick 1	9
12	Quebec 2	2
9	New Brunswick 1	9
10	Nova Scotia 2	10
11	Northern Ontario 1	3
10	Nova Scotia 2	8

==== C Bracket ====
For Seeds 13 to 15

Team	Skip	W	L	PF	PA
Newfoundland and Labrador 1	Cailey Locke	2	0	19	5
New Brunswick 2	Maizie Carter	1	1	8	13
Northern Ontario 2	Kameron Tellier	0	2	7	16

==== D Bracket ====
For Seeds 16 to 18

Team	Skip	W	L	PF	PA
Prince Edward Island	Ella Lenentine	2	0	13	6
Northwest Territories	Reese Wainman	1	1	8	13
Saskatchewan	Shawna Simpson	0	2	9	11

==== E Bracket ====
For Seeds 19 to 21

Team	Skip	W	L	PF	PA
British Columbia 2	Megan Rempel	2	0	22	4
Newfoundland and Labrador 2	Hannah Connolly	1	1	10	11
Yukon	Hadley Callan	0	2	4	21

=== Final standings ===
Place	Team
1st place, gold medalist(s)	Manitoba
2nd place, silver medalist(s)	Quebec 1
3rd place, bronze medalist(s)	Ontario 2
4	Nova Scotia 1
5	Alberta 2
6	British Columbia 1
7	Ontario 1
8	Alberta 1
9	Nova Scotia 2
10	New Brunswick 1
11	Northern Ontario 1
12	Quebec 2
13	Newfoundland and Labrador 1
14	New Brunswick 2
15	Northern Ontario 2
16	Prince Edward Island
17	Northwest Territories
18	Saskatchewan
19	British Columbia 2
20	Newfoundland and Labrador 2
21	Yukon
