= 2023 Canadian U18 Curling Championships =

- Host city: Timmins, Ontario
- Arena: McIntyre Arena & McIntyre Curling Club
- Dates: February 5–11
- Men's winner: Alberta 2
- Curling club: Saville Community SC, Edmonton, Sherwood Park CC, Sherwood Park & Okotoks CC, Okotoks
- Skip: Zachary Davies
- Third: Benjamin Kiist
- Second: Terren Algot
- Lead: Lucas Sawiak
- Alternate: Logan Thomas
- Coach: Byron Jagoe
- Finalist: Nova Scotia 1 (Mosher)
- Women's winner: Alberta 1
- Curling club: Airdrie CC, Airdrie & Sherwood Park CC, Sherwood Park
- Skip: Myla Plett
- Third: Alyssa Nedohin
- Second: Chloe Fediuk
- Lead: Allie Iskiw
- Coach: Blair Lenton
- Finalist: New Brunswick 2 (Forsythe)

The 2023 Canadian U18 Curling Championships were held from February 5 to 11 at the McIntyre Arena and the McIntyre Curling Club in Timmins, Ontario. Timmins was originally scheduled to host the 2021 edition of the event, however, it was cancelled due to the COVID-19 pandemic in Ontario. It was also set to host the 2022 event before it was postponed and later moved to Oakville, Ontario.

This was the fifth edition of the Canadian U18 Curling Championships. The inaugural edition was held in Moncton, New Brunswick in 2017 and was again held in New Brunswick in Saint Andrews in 2018. After the 2019 event in Sherwood Park, Alberta, the U18 nationals were cancelled in 2020 and 2021 due to the COVID-19 pandemic. The event returned in 2022 in Oakville, Ontario with an expanded field of twenty-one teams in each division. The 2023 edition also used this twenty-one-team format, splitting the teams into three pools of seven. The top four teams from each pool at the end of the round robin advanced to the playoff round. Based on results from the 2019 and 2022 events, certain provinces earned two berths to the championship. On both sides, all regions except for Newfoundland and Labrador, Prince Edward Island and the Northwest Territories got a second team.

== Medallists ==
Under-18	Gold	Silver	Bronze
Men	Alberta 2 Zachary Davies; Benjamin Kiist; Terren Algot; Lucas Sawiak; Logan Thomas	Nova Scotia 1 Nick Mosher; Evan Hennigar; Owen McPherson; Aidan MacDonald	Nova Scotia 2 Calan MacIsaac; Nathan Gray; Owain Fisher; Christopher McCurdy
Women	Alberta 1 Myla Plett; Alyssa Nedohin; Chloe Fediuk; Allie Iskiw	New Brunswick 2 Mélodie Forsythe; Rebecca Watson; Izzy Paterson; Caylee Smith	Nova Scotia 2 Sophie Blades; Kate Weissent; Stephanie Atherton; Alexis Cluney

== Men ==
=== Teams ===
The teams are listed as follows:

Province / Territory	Skip	Third	Second	Lead	Alternate	Club(s)
Alberta 1	Jaxon Hiebert	Oliver Burton	Kolby MacDonald	Nate Burton	Aidan Snider	Sherwood Park CC, Sherwood Park
Alberta 2	Zachary Davies	Benjamin Kiist	Terren Algot	Lucas Sawiak	Logan Thomas	Saville/Sherwood Park/Okotoks
British Columbia 1	Nolan Blaeser (Fourth)	Kaiden Beck (Skip)	Nolan Beck	Koen Hampshire		Vernon CC, Vernon
British Columbia 2	Adrian Tam	Austin Tomlinson	Ethan Chiu	Harrison Hrynew		Port Moody CC, Port Moody
Manitoba 1	Jace Freeman	Elias Huminicki	Jack Steski	Rylan Graham		Virden CC, Virden
Manitoba 2	Ronan Peterson	Nick Senff	Roan Hunker	Nathan Kelly		Heather CC, Winnipeg
New Brunswick 1	Timothy Marin	Rajan Dalrymple	Emmett Knee	Cameron Sallaj		Thistle-St. Andrews CC, Saint John
New Brunswick 2	Luke Robichaud	James Carr	Austen Matheson	Aiden Matheson		Capital WC, Fredericton
Newfoundland and Labrador	Simon Perry	Nicholas Codner	William Butler	Evan Scott		RE/MAX Centre, St. John's
Northern Ontario 1	Brendan Rajala	Jackson Dubinsky	Jesse Crozier	Adam Wiersema		Northern Credit Union CC, Sudbury
Northern Ontario 2	Evan Robert	Justin MacKay	Ben Appleton	Ben Miskiw		Community First CC, Sault Ste. Marie
Northwest Territories	Jullian Bowling	Tasir Bhuiyan	Shawn Dragon	Ian Gau		Yellowknife CC, Yellowknife
Nova Scotia 1	Nick Mosher	Evan Hennigar	Owen McPherson	Aidan MacDonald		Halifax CC, Halifax
Nova Scotia 2	Calan MacIsaac	Nathan Gray	Owain Fisher	Christopher McCurdy		Truro CC, Truro
Ontario 1	Kyle Stratton	Liam Tardif	Dylan Stockton	Owen Nicholls	Wyatt Wright	London CC, London
Ontario 2	Nicholas Rowe	Jonathan Biemans	Tyler Biemans	Liam Rowe	Joe Stachon	Ottawa Hunt & GC, Ottawa
Prince Edward Island	Brayden Snow	Jack MacFadyen	Davis Nicholson	Anderson MacDougall		Cornwall/Summerside
Quebec 1	Raphaël Tremblay	Thomas Lauzon	Pierre-Olivier Roy	Justin Lapointe	Jacob Lepage	CC Collines, Chelsea
Quebec 2	Philippe Jauron	Étienne Élias	Alexandre Jauron	Emmanuel Normand		CC Sept-Îles, Sept-Îles
Saskatchewan 1	Dylan Derksen	Logan Sawicki	Tyler Derksen	Gavin Martens		Martensville CC, Martensville
Saskatchewan 2	Rogan Snow	Nathan Roy	Luke Olson	Cole Hilderman		Sutherland CC, Saskatoon

=== Round robin standings ===
Final Round Robin Standings

Key
Teams to Playoffs

Pool A	Skip	W	L	DSC
Alberta 2	Zachary Davies	6	0	387.6
New Brunswick 1	Timothy Marin	5	1	392.5
Newfoundland and Labrador	Simon Perry	4	2	559.9
Prince Edward Island	Brayden Snow	2	4	431.9
British Columbia 1	Kaiden Beck	2	4	437.8
Ontario 1	Kyle Stratton	2	4	524.3
British Columbia 2	Adrian Tam	0	6	969.1

Pool B	Skip	W	L	DSC
Alberta 1	Jaxon Hiebert	6	0	530.1
Nova Scotia 1	Nick Mosher	4	2	431.6
Quebec 1	Raphaël Tremblay	4	2	583.6
Ontario 2	Nicholas Rowe	3	3	450.3
Manitoba 2	Ronan Peterson	3	3	623.9
New Brunswick 2	Luke Robichaud	1	5	1099.1
Northwest Territories	Jullian Bowling	0	6	911.6

Pool C	Skip	W	L	DSC
Nova Scotia 2	Calan MacIsaac	6	0	440.1
Manitoba 1	Jace Freeman	4	2	936.9
Northern Ontario 1	Brendan Rajala	4	2	428.0
Saskatchewan 2	Rogan Snow	3	3	394.5
Northern Ontario 2	Evan Robert	2	4	540.0
Quebec 2	Philippe Jauron	1	5	424.7
Saskatchewan 1	Dylan Derksen	1	5	1045.7

=== Round robin results ===
All draw times are listed in Eastern Time (UTC−04:00).

==== Draw 1 ====
Sunday, February 5, 9:30 am

Sheet A	1	2	3	4	5	6	7	8	Final
British Columbia 2 (Tam)	0	0	0	0	0	0	X	X	0
Prince Edward Island (B. Snow) 🔨	1	0	3	1	2	1	X	X	8

Sheet B	1	2	3	4	5	6	7	8	Final
British Columbia 1 (Beck)	0	2	0	0	0	1	0	X	3
Alberta 2 (Davies) 🔨	2	0	2	1	1	0	2	X	8

Sheet C	1	2	3	4	5	6	7	8	Final
Newfoundland and Labrador (Perry) 🔨	1	0	0	3	0	2	0	X	6
New Brunswick 1 (Marin)	0	3	2	0	3	0	2	X	10

Sheet D	1	2	3	4	5	6	7	8	Final
New Brunswick 2 (Robichaud)	3	0	2	0	2	0	2	X	9
Northwest Territories (Bowling) 🔨	0	0	0	2	0	1	0	X	3

Sheet E	1	2	3	4	5	6	7	8	Final
Alberta 1 (Hiebert) 🔨	0	1	0	0	0	0	0	2	3
Manitoba 2 (Peterson)	0	0	0	0	0	2	0	0	2

Sheet F	1	2	3	4	5	6	7	8	Final
Quebec 1 (Tremblay) 🔨	2	0	1	0	1	1	0	X	5
Ontario 2 (Rowe)	0	0	0	2	0	0	1	X	3

Sheet G	1	2	3	4	5	6	7	8	9	Final
Northern Ontario 1 (Rajala)	2	0	2	0	1	0	1	0	1	7
Quebec 2 (Jauron) 🔨	0	0	0	3	0	2	0	1	0	6

Sheet H	1	2	3	4	5	6	7	8	Final
Manitoba 1 (Freeman)	0	2	0	2	0	2	0	0	6
Saskatchewan 2 (R. Snow) 🔨	1	0	1	0	3	0	1	1	7

Sheet I	1	2	3	4	5	6	7	8	Final
Northern Ontario 2 (Robert)	0	0	0	2	0	2	1	X	5
Nova Scotia 2 (MacIsaac) 🔨	0	2	3	0	3	0	0	X	8

==== Draw 3 ====
Sunday, February 5, 7:00 pm

Sheet A	1	2	3	4	5	6	7	8	Final
Saskatchewan 2 (R. Snow)	0	1	1	0	0	0	X	X	2
Northern Ontario 2 (Robert) 🔨	2	0	0	2	3	2	X	X	9

Sheet B	1	2	3	4	5	6	7	8	Final
Nova Scotia 2 (MacIsaac) 🔨	0	2	2	0	2	0	2	X	8
Quebec 2 (Jauron)	0	0	0	2	0	1	0	X	3

Sheet C	1	2	3	4	5	6	7	8	Final
Saskatchewan 1 (Derksen)	0	2	0	0	1	0	0	0	3
Northern Ontario 1 (Rajala) 🔨	2	0	2	1	0	0	1	1	7

Sheet D	1	2	3	4	5	6	7	8	Final
Manitoba 2 (Peterson) 🔨	0	0	1	1	0	2	1	0	5
Quebec 1 (Tremblay)	0	1	0	0	2	0	0	3	6

Sheet E	1	2	3	4	5	6	7	8	Final
Ontario 2 (Rowe) 🔨	1	2	0	0	2	2	0	X	7
Northwest Territories (Bowling)	0	0	1	1	0	0	1	X	3

Sheet F	1	2	3	4	5	6	7	8	Final
Nova Scotia 1 (Mosher) 🔨	0	0	2	0	1	4	0	0	7
New Brunswick 2 (Robichaud)	1	2	0	0	0	0	1	2	6

Sheet G	1	2	3	4	5	6	7	8	Final
Alberta 2 (Davies) 🔨	2	0	1	0	1	0	1	2	7
Newfoundland and Labrador (Perry)	0	1	0	1	0	1	0	0	3

Sheet H	1	2	3	4	5	6	7	8	Final
New Brunswick 1 (Marin) 🔨	2	1	1	0	1	1	0	X	6
Prince Edward Island (B. Snow)	0	0	0	1	0	0	2	X	3

Sheet I	1	2	3	4	5	6	7	8	Final
Ontario 1 (Stratton) 🔨	5	0	0	1	1	0	1	X	8
British Columbia 2 (Tam)	0	0	1	0	0	1	0	X	2

==== Draw 5 ====
Monday, February 6, 2:00 pm

Sheet A	1	2	3	4	5	6	7	8	Final
Alberta 1 (Hiebert)	0	2	3	0	1	0	0	2	8
Ontario 2 (Rowe) 🔨	1	0	0	1	0	1	1	0	4

Sheet B	1	2	3	4	5	6	7	8	Final
Quebec 1 (Tremblay)	2	0	0	2	0	0	2	0	6
Nova Scotia 1 (Mosher) 🔨	0	1	2	0	1	2	0	1	7

Sheet C	1	2	3	4	5	6	7	8	Final
Manitoba 2 (Peterson)	1	0	0	4	0	4	X	X	9
Northwest Territories (Bowling) 🔨	0	1	0	0	1	0	X	X	2

Sheet D	1	2	3	4	5	6	7	8	Final
Alberta 2 (Davies) 🔨	0	3	1	0	3	0	X	X	7
Prince Edward Island (B. Snow)	0	0	0	0	0	1	X	X	1

Sheet E	1	2	3	4	5	6	7	8	Final
Newfoundland and Labrador (Perry)	0	0	3	0	0	0	0	1	4
Ontario 1 (Stratton) 🔨	0	0	0	0	0	2	1	0	3

Sheet F	1	2	3	4	5	6	7	8	Final
British Columbia 1 (Beck)	0	0	1	0	1	0	0	X	2
New Brunswick 1 (Marin) 🔨	0	0	0	1	0	4	0	X	5

Sheet G	1	2	3	4	5	6	7	8	Final
Manitoba 1 (Freeman)	0	0	1	0	0	2	0	0	3
Nova Scotia 2 (MacIsaac) 🔨	0	1	0	1	1	0	0	1	4

Sheet H	1	2	3	4	5	6	7	8	9	Final
Northern Ontario 2 (Robert) 🔨	0	0	0	2	0	1	0	1	0	4
Saskatchewan 1 (Derksen)	1	0	1	0	1	0	1	0	1	5

Sheet I	1	2	3	4	5	6	7	8	Final
Saskatchewan 2 (R. Snow) 🔨	2	1	4	0	4	0	X	X	11
Quebec 2 (Jauron)	0	0	0	3	0	1	X	X	4

==== Draw 7 ====
Tuesday, February 7, 9:30 am

Sheet A	1	2	3	4	5	6	7	8	Final
British Columbia 1 (Beck) 🔨	1	0	0	0	0	0	X	X	1
Newfoundland and Labrador (Perry)	0	4	1	1	3	1	X	X	10

Sheet B	1	2	3	4	5	6	7	8	Final
Prince Edward Island (B. Snow) 🔨	0	0	2	0	0	0	0	X	2
Ontario 1 (Stratton)	0	2	0	1	0	1	2	X	6

Sheet C	1	2	3	4	5	6	7	8	Final
Alberta 2 (Davies) 🔨	3	0	1	0	0	1	0	2	7
British Columbia 2 (Tam)	0	1	0	1	1	0	1	0	4

Sheet D	1	2	3	4	5	6	7	8	Final
Manitoba 1 (Freeman)	1	1	1	0	1	0	2	X	6
Northern Ontario 2 (Robert) 🔨	0	0	0	1	0	1	0	X	2

Sheet E	1	2	3	4	5	6	7	8	Final
Quebec 2 (Jauron) 🔨	1	0	2	0	2	1	0	2	8
Saskatchewan 1 (Derksen)	0	1	0	3	0	0	1	0	5

Sheet F	1	2	3	4	5	6	7	8	Final
Saskatchewan 2 (R. Snow) 🔨	1	1	0	2	0	0	1	0	5
Northern Ontario 1 (Rajala)	0	0	1	0	2	0	0	3	6

Sheet G	1	2	3	4	5	6	7	8	Final
Alberta 1 (Hiebert)	0	2	0	0	0	2	0	1	5
Quebec 1 (Tremblay) 🔨	1	0	0	0	1	0	2	0	4

Sheet H	1	2	3	4	5	6	7	8	Final
Northwest Territories (Bowling)	0	0	1	0	1	0	X	X	2
Nova Scotia 1 (Mosher) 🔨	2	2	0	3	0	1	X	X	8

Sheet I	1	2	3	4	5	6	7	8	Final
Manitoba 2 (Peterson) 🔨	1	0	1	1	2	0	0	X	5
New Brunswick 2 (Robichaud)	0	1	0	0	0	1	0	X	2

==== Draw 9 ====
Tuesday, February 7, 6:30 pm

Sheet A	1	2	3	4	5	6	7	8	Final
Nova Scotia 2 (MacIsaac) 🔨	0	3	0	3	0	0	1	X	7
Saskatchewan 1 (Derksen)	1	0	1	0	1	0	0	X	3

Sheet B	1	2	3	4	5	6	7	8	Final
Northern Ontario 1 (Rajala) 🔨	1	0	0	0	0	0	1	0	2
Manitoba 1 (Freeman)	0	0	1	1	1	0	0	0	3

Sheet C	1	2	3	4	5	6	7	8	9	Final
Quebec 2 (Jauron) 🔨	2	0	0	1	0	1	0	1	0	5
Northern Ontario 2 (Robert)	0	0	1	0	2	0	2	0	1	6

Sheet D	1	2	3	4	5	6	7	8	Final
New Brunswick 1 (Marin) 🔨	0	0	2	0	1	0	2	1	6
Ontario 1 (Stratton)	1	0	0	2	0	1	0	0	4

Sheet E	1	2	3	4	5	6	7	8	Final
British Columbia 2 (Tam) 🔨	1	0	0	1	0	0	X	X	2
British Columbia 1 (Beck)	0	4	2	0	1	1	X	X	8

Sheet F	1	2	3	4	5	6	7	8	Final
Prince Edward Island (B. Snow) 🔨	0	0	1	1	0	2	1	0	5
Newfoundland and Labrador (Perry)	0	2	0	0	2	0	0	2	6

Sheet G	1	2	3	4	5	6	7	8	Final
Ontario 2 (Rowe) 🔨	3	0	0	0	2	0	1	0	6
Nova Scotia 1 (Mosher)	0	1	3	2	0	1	0	3	10

Sheet H	1	2	3	4	5	6	7	8	9	Final
New Brunswick 2 (Robichaud) 🔨	1	0	0	1	2	0	1	1	0	6
Alberta 1 (Hiebert)	0	2	3	0	0	1	0	0	2	8

Sheet I	1	2	3	4	5	6	7	8	Final
Northwest Territories (Bowling)	0	0	3	0	1	0	3	0	7
Quebec 1 (Tremblay) 🔨	2	0	0	5	0	1	0	1	9

==== Draw 11 ====
Wednesday, February 8, 2:00 pm

Sheet A	1	2	3	4	5	6	7	8	Final
Nova Scotia 1 (Mosher) 🔨	0	0	1	0	0	0	0	X	1
Manitoba 2 (Peterson)	0	0	0	2	2	1	1	X	6

Sheet B	1	2	3	4	5	6	7	8	Final
Northwest Territories (Bowling)	0	0	1	0	0	2	X	X	3
Alberta 1 (Hiebert) 🔨	4	1	0	4	1	0	X	X	10

Sheet C	1	2	3	4	5	6	7	8	Final
New Brunswick 2 (Robichaud)	0	1	0	1	0	0	X	X	2
Ontario 2 (Rowe) 🔨	3	0	2	0	3	1	X	X	9

Sheet D	1	2	3	4	5	6	7	8	Final
Saskatchewan 1 (Derksen) 🔨	0	0	1	0	0	1	0	0	2
Saskatchewan 2 (R. Snow)	1	0	0	0	2	0	1	1	5

Sheet E	1	2	3	4	5	6	7	8	Final
Northern Ontario 1 (Rajala) 🔨	0	1	0	1	0	0	0	X	2
Nova Scotia 2 (MacIsaac)	0	0	2	0	2	1	1	X	6

Sheet F	1	2	3	4	5	6	7	8	Final
Quebec 2 (Jauron)	0	0	0	2	2	0	1	0	5
Manitoba 1 (Freeman) 🔨	3	0	2	0	0	1	0	1	7

Sheet G	1	2	3	4	5	6	7	8	Final
British Columbia 2 (Tam)	0	0	2	0	2	1	0	X	5
New Brunswick 1 (Marin) 🔨	2	3	0	3	0	0	3	X	11

Sheet H	1	2	3	4	5	6	7	8	Final
Ontario 1 (Stratton)	0	0	2	1	1	0	0	X	4
Alberta 2 (Davies) 🔨	0	5	0	0	0	3	1	X	9

Sheet I	1	2	3	4	5	6	7	8	Final
Prince Edward Island (B. Snow)	0	2	0	4	0	0	2	0	8
British Columbia 1 (Beck) 🔨	1	0	2	0	1	2	0	1	7

==== Draw 13 ====
Thursday, February 9, 8:30 am

Sheet A	1	2	3	4	5	6	7	8	Final
Quebec 1 (Tremblay) 🔨	1	2	4	0	0	1	0	X	8
New Brunswick 2 (Robichaud)	0	0	0	1	1	0	1	X	3

Sheet B	1	2	3	4	5	6	7	8	Final
Ontario 2 (Rowe) 🔨	0	0	0	2	0	0	0	3	5
Manitoba 2 (Peterson)	0	0	1	0	0	2	1	0	4

Sheet C	1	2	3	4	5	6	7	8	Final
New Brunswick 1 (Marin) 🔨	2	0	1	0	2	0	1	0	6
Alberta 2 (Davies)	0	2	0	1	0	2	0	2	7

Sheet D	1	2	3	4	5	6	7	8	Final
Nova Scotia 1 (Mosher)	0	0	1	0	0	0	X	X	1
Alberta 1 (Hiebert) 🔨	3	0	0	2	1	2	X	X	8

Sheet E	1	2	3	4	5	6	7	8	Final
Saskatchewan 1 (Derksen)	0	0	0	2	0	2	0	X	4
Manitoba 1 (Freeman) 🔨	1	3	1	0	1	0	2	X	8

Sheet F	1	2	3	4	5	6	7	8	Final
Ontario 1 (Stratton)	1	0	0	0	3	0	2	X	6
British Columbia 1 (Beck) 🔨	0	2	2	2	0	2	0	X	8

Sheet G	1	2	3	4	5	6	7	8	Final
Northern Ontario 2 (Robert) 🔨	0	1	0	0	2	1	1	0	5
Northern Ontario 1 (Rajala)	2	0	1	1	0	0	0	2	6

Sheet H	1	2	3	4	5	6	7	8	Final
Newfoundland and Labrador (Perry)	1	2	0	2	0	1	0	1	7
British Columbia 2 (Tam) 🔨	0	0	2	0	1	0	1	0	4

Sheet I	1	2	3	4	5	6	7	8	Final
Nova Scotia 2 (MacIsaac) 🔨	0	1	0	2	0	0	3	2	8
Saskatchewan 2 (R. Snow)	0	0	1	0	1	2	0	0	4

=== Playoffs ===
Qualification Games
8	Quebec 1	6
9	Manitoba 1	8
5	Northern Ontario 1	4
12	Prince Edward Island	8
6	Nova Scotia 1	7
11	Ontario 2	5
7	Newfoundland and Labrador	12
10	Saskatchewan 2	2

Quarterfinals
1	Alberta 2	7
9	Manitoba 1	3
4	New Brunswick 1	6
12	Prince Edward Island	5
3	Alberta 1	4
6	Nova Scotia 1	7
2	Nova Scotia 2	10
7	Newfoundland and Labrador	8

Semifinals
1	Alberta 2	8
4	New Brunswick 1	4
6	Nova Scotia 1	6
2	Nova Scotia 2	4

Final
1	Alberta 2	9
6	Nova Scotia 1	2

==== Qualification games ====
Thursday, February 9, 4:30 pm

Sheet A	1	2	3	4	5	6	7	8	Final
Quebec 1 (Tremblay) 🔨	1	0	2	1	1	0	1	0	6
Manitoba 1 (Freeman)	0	1	0	0	0	6	0	1	8

Player percentages
Quebec 1		Manitoba 1	
Justin Lapointe	80%	Rylan Graham	84%
Pierre-Olivier Roy	75%	Jack Steski	77%
Thomas Lauzon	78%	Elias Huminicki	75%
Raphaël Tremblay	77%	Jace Freeman	70%
Total	77%	Total	77%

Sheet B	1	2	3	4	5	6	7	8	Final
Northern Ontario 1 (Rajala) 🔨	1	0	0	0	2	0	1	0	4
Prince Edward Island (B. Snow)	0	0	2	2	0	1	0	3	8

Player percentages
Northern Ontario 1		Prince Edward Island	
Adam Wiersema	84%	Anderson MacDougall	83%
Jesse Crozier	73%	Davis Nicholson	83%
Jackson Dubinsky	72%	Jack MacFadyen	80%
Brendan Rajala	81%	Brayden Snow	81%
Total	78%	Total	82%

Sheet C	1	2	3	4	5	6	7	8	Final
Nova Scotia 1 (Mosher) 🔨	1	0	2	2	0	0	1	1	7
Ontario 2 (Rowe)	0	1	0	0	2	2	0	0	5

Player percentages
Nova Scotia 1		Ontario 2	
Aidan MacDonald	77%	Liam Rowe	78%
Owen McPherson	64%	Tyler Biemans	84%
Evan Hennigar	88%	Jonathan Biemans	67%
Nick Mosher	77%	Nicholas Rowe	72%
Total	76%	Total	75%

Sheet E	1	2	3	4	5	6	7	8	Final
Newfoundland and Labrador (Perry)	1	5	0	4	0	2	X	X	12
Saskatchewan 2 (R. Snow) 🔨	0	0	1	0	1	0	X	X	2

Player percentages
Newfoundland and Labrador		Saskatchewan 2	
Evan Scott	88%	Cole Hilderman	67%
William Butler	90%	Luke Olson	81%
Nicholas Codner	79%	Nathan Roy	50%
Simon Perry	98%	Rogan Snow	46%
Total	89%	Total	61%

==== Quarterfinals ====
Friday, February 10, 8:30 am

Sheet A	1	2	3	4	5	6	7	8	Final
Alberta 1 (Hiebert) 🔨	1	0	0	0	1	2	0	0	4
Nova Scotia 1 (Mosher)	0	1	1	1	0	0	3	1	7

Player percentages
Alberta 1		Nova Scotia 1	
Nate Burton	91%	Aidan MacDonald	89%
Kolby MacDonald	91%	Owen McPherson	84%
Oliver Burton	77%	Evan Hennigar	81%
Jaxon Hiebert	72%	Nick Mosher	77%
Total	82%	Total	83%

Sheet B	1	2	3	4	5	6	7	8	Final
Alberta 2 (Davies)	0	0	2	3	1	0	1	X	7
Manitoba 1 (Freeman) 🔨	0	1	0	0	0	2	0	X	3

Player percentages
Alberta 2		Manitoba 1	
Lucas Sawiak	80%	Rylan Graham	86%
Terren Algot	83%	Jack Steski	94%
Benjamin Kiist	89%	Elias Huminicki	83%
Zachary Davies	97%	Jace Freeman	86%
Total	87%	Total	87%

Sheet C	1	2	3	4	5	6	7	8	9	Final
Nova Scotia 2 (MacIsaac) 🔨	2	0	0	0	3	0	2	1	2	10
Newfoundland and Labrador (Perry)	0	3	1	1	0	3	0	0	0	8

Player percentages
Nova Scotia 2		Newfoundland and Labrador	
Christopher McCurdy	93%	Evan Scott	82%
Owain Fisher	86%	William Butler	82%
Nathan Gray	90%	Nicholas Codner	75%
Calan MacIsaac	78%	Simon Perry	74%
Total	87%	Total	78%

Sheet E	1	2	3	4	5	6	7	8	Final
New Brunswick 1 (Marin) 🔨	1	0	0	1	0	3	0	1	6
Prince Edward Island (B. Snow)	0	1	1	0	1	0	2	0	5

Player percentages
New Brunswick 1		Prince Edward Island	
Cameron Sallaj	75%	Anderson MacDougall	86%
Emmett Knee	77%	Davis Nicholson	81%
Rajan Dalrymple	50%	Jack MacFadyen	80%
Timothy Marin	69%	Brayden Snow	61%
Total	68%	Total	77%

==== Semifinals ====
Friday, February 10, 4:30 pm

Sheet B	1	2	3	4	5	6	7	8	Final
Nova Scotia 1 (Mosher) 🔨	2	0	2	0	0	1	0	1	6
Nova Scotia 2 (MacIsaac)	0	2	0	1	0	0	1	0	4

Player percentages
Nova Scotia 1		Nova Scotia 2	
Aidan MacDonald	47%	Christopher McCurdy	78%
Owen McPherson	86%	Owain Fisher	64%
Evan Hennigar	80%	Nathan Gray	69%
Nick Mosher	80%	Calan MacIsaac	66%
Total	73%	Total	69%

Sheet D	1	2	3	4	5	6	7	8	Final
Alberta 2 (Davies) 🔨	3	0	1	0	2	0	2	X	8
New Brunswick 1 (Marin)	0	1	0	2	0	1	0	X	4

Player percentages
Alberta 2		New Brunswick 1	
Lucas Sawiak	80%	Cameron Sallaj	86%
Terren Algot	84%	Emmett Knee	64%
Benjamin Kiist	88%	Rajan Dalrymple	48%
Zachary Davies	71%	Timothy Marin	70%
Total	81%	Total	67%

==== Final ====
Saturday, February 11, 12:30 pm

Sheet C	1	2	3	4	5	6	7	8	Final
Alberta 2 (Davies) 🔨	0	2	0	3	2	0	2	X	9
Nova Scotia 1 (Mosher)	0	0	1	0	0	1	0	X	2

Player percentages
Alberta 2		Nova Scotia 1	
Lucas Sawiak	80%	Aidan MacDonald	88%
Terren Algot	82%	Owen McPherson	64%
Benjamin Kiist	95%	Evan Hennigar	80%
Zachary Davies	79%	Nick Mosher	41%
Total	84%	Total	68%

=== Consolation ===
==== A Bracket ====
For Seeds 3 to 8

Bronze medal game
4	New Brunswick 1	1
2	Nova Scotia 2	8

5th/6th
9	Manitoba 1	7
12	Prince Edward Island	1
9	Manitoba 1	5
3	Alberta 1	9
3	Alberta 1	6
7	Newfoundland and Labrador	2

==== B Bracket ====
For Seeds 9 to 12

9th/10th
8	Quebec 1	4
5	Northern Ontario 1	6
5	Northern Ontario 1	4
11	Ontario 2	5
11	Ontario 2	7
10	Saskatchewan 2	4

==== C Bracket ====
For Seeds 13 to 15

Team	Skip	W	L	PF	PA
Manitoba 2	Ronan Peterson	2	0	14	4
British Columbia 1	Kaiden Beck	1	1	10	12
Ontario 1	Kyle Stratton	0	2	5	13

==== D Bracket ====
For Seeds 16 to 18

Team	Skip	W	L	PF	PA
Quebec 2	Philippe Jauron	2	0	15	12
Saskatchewan 1	Dylan Derksen	1	1	14	12
Northern Ontario 2	Evan Robert	0	2	13	18

==== E Bracket ====
For Seeds 19 to 21

Team	Skip	W	L	PF	PA
New Brunswick 2	Luke Robichaud	2	0	13	8
British Columbia 2	Adrian Tam	1	1	11	11
Northwest Territories	Jullian Bowling	0	2	10	15

=== Final standings ===
Place	Team
1st place, gold medalist(s)	Alberta 2
2nd place, silver medalist(s)	Nova Scotia 1
3rd place, bronze medalist(s)	Nova Scotia 2
4	New Brunswick 1
5	Alberta 1
6	Manitoba 1
7	Newfoundland and Labrador
8	Prince Edward Island
9	Ontario 2
10	Northern Ontario 1
11	Quebec 1
12	Saskatchewan 2
13	Manitoba 2
14	British Columbia 1
15	Ontario 1
16	Quebec 2
17	Saskatchewan 1
18	Northern Ontario 2
19	New Brunswick 2
20	British Columbia 2
21	Northwest Territories

== Women ==
=== Teams ===
The teams are listed as follows:

Province / Territory	Skip	Third	Second	Lead	Alternate	Club(s)
Alberta 1	Myla Plett	Alyssa Nedohin	Chloe Fediuk	Allie Iskiw		Airdrie/Sherwood Park
Alberta 2	Emma DeSchiffart	Morgan DeSchiffart	Abby Whitbread	Natalie Cholin	Rhiley DeSchiffart	Lacombe CC, Lacombe
British Columbia 1	Holly Hafeli	Jorja Kopytko	Eryn Czirfusz	Natalie Hafeli		Kamloops CC, Kamloops
British Columbia 2	Keelie Duncan	Carley Hardie	Ashley Fenton	Meredith McCullum		Comox Valley CC, Courtenay
Manitoba 1	Dayna Wahl	Piper Stoesz	Anna Marie Ginters	Gillian Hildebrand		Altona CC, Altona
Manitoba 2	Grace Beaudry	Cassidy Dundas	Lauren Evason	Tessa Terrick		St. Vital CC, Winnipeg
New Brunswick 1	Lauren Price (Fourth)	Marlise Carter (Skip)	Summer Merrithew	Morgan Finley		Capital WC, Fredericton
New Brunswick 2	Mélodie Forsythe	Rebecca Watson	Izzy Paterson	Caylee Smith		Capital WC, Fredericton
Newfoundland and Labrador	Cailey Locke	Katie Peddigrew	Sitaye Penney	Kate Young	Hayley Gushue	RE/MAX Centre, St. John's
Northern Ontario 1	Mia Toner	Valerie Ouimet	Justine Toner	Clara Dissanayake		Northern Credit Union CC, Sudbury
Northern Ontario 2	Claire Dubinsky	Rylie Paul	Bella McCarville	Lily Ariganello		Kakabeka Falls CC, Kakabeka Falls
Northwest Territories	Kali Skauge	Sydney Galusha	Ella Skauge	Brynn Chorostkowski	Mackenzie Chiasson	Yellowknife CC, Yellowknife
Nova Scotia 1	Rebecca Regan	MacKenzie Hiltz	Ella Wilson	Ella Kinley	Ace MacDonald	Lakeshore CC, Lower Sackville
Nova Scotia 2	Sophie Blades	Kate Weissent	Stephanie Atherton	Alexis Cluney		Chester CC, Chester
Ontario 1	Katrina Frlan	Erika Wainwright	Isabella McLean	Lauren Norman	Robynn Krasek	Huntley CC, Carp
Ontario 2	Emilie Padbury	Kaitlyn Dumoulin	Megan Zwolak	Sydney Anderson	Brooklyn Ideson	Ottawa Hunt & GC, Ottawa
Prince Edward Island	Ella Lenentine	Makiya Noonan	Kacey Gauthier	Erika Pater		Cornwall CC, Cornwall
Quebec 1	Jolianne Fortin	Emy Lafrance	Megan Lafrance	Mégane Fortin		CC Kénogami, Jonquière
Quebec 2	Anne-Sophie Gionest	Sarah Bergeron	Léanne Fortin	Juliette Bergeron		CC Riverbend, Alma
Saskatchewan 1	Cara Kesslering	Kaydence Lalonde	Aryn Thibault	Kaylee Rosenfelt		Sutherland CC, Saskatoon
Saskatchewan 2	Savanna Taylor	Annika Steckler	Ava Beausoleil	Leah Beausoleil		Nutana CC, Saskatoon

=== Round robin standings ===
Final Round Robin Standings

Key
Teams to Playoffs

Pool A	Skip	W	L	DSC
New Brunswick 2	Mélodie Forsythe	5	1	0.00
Quebec 2	Anne-Sophie Gionest	5	1	0.00
Quebec 1	Jolianne Fortin	4	2	0.00
Newfoundland and Labrador	Cailey Locke	3	3	0.00
Prince Edward Island	Ella Lenentine	2	4	0.00
Manitoba 1	Dayna Wahl	1	5	0.00
Northern Ontario 1	Mia Toner	1	5	0.00

Pool B	Skip	W	L	DSC
British Columbia 1	Holly Hafeli	5	1	0.00
Manitoba 2	Grace Beaudry	4	2	0.00
Northern Ontario 2	Claire Dubinsky	3	3	0.00
Nova Scotia 1	Rebecca Regan	3	3	0.00
New Brunswick 1	Marlise Carter	3	3	0.00
Ontario 2	Emilie Padbury	3	3	0.00
Northwest Territories	Kali Skauge	0	6	0.00

Pool C	Skip	W	L	DSC
Alberta 1	Myla Plett	6	0	0.00
British Columbia 2	Keelie Duncan	3	3	0.00
Alberta 2	Emma DeSchiffart	3	3	0.00
Nova Scotia 2	Sophie Blades	3	3	0.00
Saskatchewan 2	Savanna Taylor	3	3	0.00
Ontario 1	Katrina Frlan	2	4	0.00
Saskatchewan 1	Cara Kesslering	1	5	0.00

=== Round robin results ===
All draw times are listed in Eastern Time (UTC−04:00).

==== Draw 2 ====
Sunday, February 5, 2:00 pm

Sheet A	1	2	3	4	5	6	7	8	Final
Quebec 2 (Gionest) 🔨	2	1	3	0	2	3	X	X	11
Newfoundland and Labrador (Locke)	0	0	0	3	0	0	X	X	3

Sheet B	1	2	3	4	5	6	7	8	Final
Quebec 1 (Fortin) 🔨	0	0	0	1	1	0	1	1	4
New Brunswick 2 (Forsythe)	1	0	0	0	0	2	0	0	3

Sheet C	1	2	3	4	5	6	7	8	Final
Prince Edward Island (Lenentine)	0	1	3	0	3	0	2	X	9
Manitoba 1 (Wahl) 🔨	0	0	0	1	0	1	0	X	2

Sheet D	1	2	3	4	5	6	7	8	Final
Manitoba 2 (Beaudry) 🔨	0	0	1	1	0	0	0	3	5
Northwest Territories (Skauge)	1	0	0	0	0	2	0	0	3

Sheet E	1	2	3	4	5	6	7	8	Final
New Brunswick 1 (Carter)	0	0	0	2	1	0	2	X	5
Ontario 2 (Padbury) 🔨	0	0	0	0	0	2	0	X	2

Sheet F	1	2	3	4	5	6	7	8	9	Final
Nova Scotia 1 (Regan) 🔨	0	0	0	0	2	0	0	1	0	3
Northern Ontario 2 (Dubinsky)	0	0	0	1	0	1	1	0	1	4

Sheet G	1	2	3	4	5	6	7	8	Final
Saskatchewan 1 (Kesslering)	0	0	0	0	2	0	0	X	3
Nova Scotia 2 (Blades) 🔨	1	1	3	4	0	3	2	X	14

Sheet H	1	2	3	4	5	6	7	8	Final
Ontario 1 (Frlan) 🔨	1	0	0	2	0	0	0	1	4
Alberta 2 (DeSchiffart)	0	0	1	0	1	1	0	0	3

Sheet I	1	2	3	4	5	6	7	8	Final
Saskatchewan 2 (Taylor) 🔨	0	0	3	0	1	1	1	0	6
British Columbia 2 (Duncan)	0	0	0	3	0	0	0	0	3

==== Draw 4 ====
Monday, February 6, 9:30 am

Sheet A	1	2	3	4	5	6	7	8	Final
Alberta 2 (DeSchiffart)	0	0	0	1	1	1	1	1	5
Saskatchewan 2 (Taylor) 🔨	0	0	4	0	0	0	0	0	4

Sheet B	1	2	3	4	5	6	7	8	9	Final
British Columbia 2 (Duncan) 🔨	1	0	1	0	1	0	2	0	1	6
Nova Scotia 2 (Blades)	0	0	0	2	0	2	0	1	0	5

Sheet C	1	2	3	4	5	6	7	8	Final
Alberta 1 (Plett) 🔨	0	0	0	2	1	2	2	X	7
Saskatchewan 1 (Kesslering)	0	0	1	0	0	0	0	X	1

Sheet D	1	2	3	4	5	6	7	8	Final
Ontario 2 (Padbury) 🔨	0	0	1	0	0	2	0	X	3
Nova Scotia 1 (Regan)	0	1	0	4	1	0	4	X	10

Sheet E	1	2	3	4	5	6	7	8	Final
Northern Ontario 2 (Dubinsky) 🔨	2	0	3	0	1	1	0	X	7
Northwest Territories (Skauge)	0	2	0	1	0	0	2	X	5

Sheet F	1	2	3	4	5	6	7	8	Final
British Columbia 1 (Hafeli)	2	1	0	0	0	0	2	X	5
Manitoba 2 (Beaudry) 🔨	0	0	0	1	0	1	0	X	2

Sheet G	1	2	3	4	5	6	7	8	Final
New Brunswick 2 (Forsythe)	2	0	0	0	3	1	3	X	9
Prince Edward Island (Lenentine) 🔨	0	0	0	1	0	0	0	X	1

Sheet H	1	2	3	4	5	6	7	8	Final
Manitoba 1 (Wahl)	0	1	0	0	0	2	0	X	3
Newfoundland and Labrador (Locke) 🔨	2	0	0	1	1	0	4	X	8

Sheet I	1	2	3	4	5	6	7	8	Final
Northern Ontario 1 (Toner) 🔨	0	0	2	0	2	0	0	X	4
Quebec 2 (Gionest)	1	1	0	3	0	1	1	X	7

==== Draw 6 ====
Monday, February 6, 6:30 pm

Sheet A	1	2	3	4	5	6	7	8	9	Final
New Brunswick 1 (Carter)	0	0	0	0	0	0	0	3	0	3
Northern Ontario 2 (Dubinsky) 🔨	0	0	0	0	2	0	1	0	1	4

Sheet B	1	2	3	4	5	6	7	8	9	Final
Nova Scotia 1 (Regan) 🔨	0	0	0	2	0	2	0	3	0	7
British Columbia 1 (Hafeli)	2	0	1	0	2	0	2	0	1	8

Sheet C	1	2	3	4	5	6	7	8	Final
Ontario 2 (Padbury) 🔨	2	1	0	2	1	3	X	X	9
Northwest Territories (Skauge)	0	0	0	0	0	0	X	X	0

Sheet D	1	2	3	4	5	6	7	8	Final
New Brunswick 2 (Forsythe)	1	1	0	1	0	1	1	X	5
Newfoundland and Labrador (Locke) 🔨	0	0	1	0	2	0	0	X	3

Sheet E	1	2	3	4	5	6	7	8	Final
Prince Edward Island (Lenentine)	0	0	2	1	4	0	0	X	7
Northern Ontario 1 (Toner) 🔨	0	0	0	0	0	1	0	X	1

Sheet F	1	2	3	4	5	6	7	8	9	Final
Quebec 1 (Fortin)	0	1	0	1	0	1	3	0	1	7
Manitoba 1 (Wahl) 🔨	0	0	0	0	5	0	0	1	0	6

Sheet G	1	2	3	4	5	6	7	8	Final
Ontario 1 (Frlan)	0	1	0	2	5	1	X	X	9
British Columbia 2 (Duncan) 🔨	1	0	1	0	0	0	X	X	2

Sheet H	1	2	3	4	5	6	7	8	Final
Saskatchewan 2 (Taylor) 🔨	0	0	1	0	0	1	0	X	2
Alberta 1 (Plett)	2	1	0	2	2	0	1	X	8

Sheet I	1	2	3	4	5	6	7	8	Final
Alberta 2 (DeSchiffart) 🔨	2	0	0	0	0	5	2	X	9
Nova Scotia 2 (Blades)	0	0	1	2	0	0	0	X	3

==== Draw 8 ====
Tuesday, February 7, 2:00 pm

Sheet A	1	2	3	4	5	6	7	8	9	Final
Quebec 1 (Fortin)	1	0	0	0	2	0	2	3	1	9
Prince Edward Island (Lenentine) 🔨	0	2	2	2	0	2	0	0	0	8

Sheet B	1	2	3	4	5	6	7	8	Final
Newfoundland and Labrador (Locke) 🔨	2	0	1	0	5	1	X	X	9
Northern Ontario 1 (Toner)	0	0	0	1	0	0	X	X	1

Sheet C	1	2	3	4	5	6	7	8	Final
New Brunswick 2 (Forsythe) 🔨	1	0	0	3	4	0	3	X	11
Quebec 2 (Gionest)	0	0	1	0	0	2	0	X	3

Sheet D	1	2	3	4	5	6	7	8	Final
Ontario 1 (Frlan) 🔨	0	1	0	0	1	0	0	X	2
Saskatchewan 2 (Taylor)	0	0	1	2	0	0	4	X	7

Sheet E	1	2	3	4	5	6	7	8	9	Final
Nova Scotia 2 (Blades)	0	1	0	2	0	2	0	2	0	7
Alberta 1 (Plett) 🔨	1	0	2	0	2	0	2	0	2	9

Sheet F	1	2	3	4	5	6	7	8	Final
Alberta 2 (DeSchiffart)	1	0	0	0	3	0	0	2	6
Saskatchewan 1 (Kesslering) 🔨	0	1	2	1	0	1	0	0	5

Sheet G	1	2	3	4	5	6	7	8	Final
New Brunswick 1 (Carter)	0	0	0	1	0	0	1	X	2
Nova Scotia 1 (Regan) 🔨	1	0	4	0	2	1	0	X	8

Sheet H	1	2	3	4	5	6	7	8	Final
Northwest Territories (Skauge) 🔨	0	0	0	0	0	0	X	X	0
British Columbia 1 (Hafeli)	1	3	2	1	2	4	X	X	13

Sheet I	1	2	3	4	5	6	7	8	Final
Ontario 2 (Padbury)	0	1	0	3	0	0	0	0	4
Manitoba 2 (Beaudry) 🔨	1	0	1	0	2	0	2	1	7

==== Draw 10 ====
Wednesday, February 8, 9:30 am

Sheet A	1	2	3	4	5	6	7	8	Final
British Columbia 2 (Duncan) 🔨	0	0	2	0	0	1	X	X	3
Alberta 1 (Plett)	3	2	0	3	5	0	X	X	13

Sheet B	1	2	3	4	5	6	7	8	9	Final
Saskatchewan 1 (Kesslering) 🔨	1	0	1	2	1	0	0	0	1	6
Ontario 1 (Frlan)	0	1	0	0	0	1	1	2	0	5

Sheet C	1	2	3	4	5	6	7	8	Final
Nova Scotia 2 (Blades) 🔨	3	1	1	0	1	0	0	X	6
Saskatchewan 2 (Taylor)	0	0	0	1	0	2	1	X	4

Sheet D	1	2	3	4	5	6	7	8	Final
Manitoba 1 (Wahl) 🔨	0	0	1	0	0	0	3	3	7
Northern Ontario 1 (Toner)	0	0	0	0	2	1	0	0	3

Sheet E	1	2	3	4	5	6	7	8	9	Final
Quebec 2 (Gionest) 🔨	0	0	1	0	2	0	0	1	1	5
Quebec 1 (Fortin)	1	0	0	1	0	1	1	0	0	4

Sheet F	1	2	3	4	5	6	7	8	Final
Newfoundland and Labrador (Locke)	1	1	0	2	0	3	0	X	7
Prince Edward Island (Lenentine) 🔨	0	0	1	0	1	0	2	X	4

Sheet G	1	2	3	4	5	6	7	8	Final
Northern Ontario 2 (Dubinsky) 🔨	1	0	0	1	0	0	0	X	2
British Columbia 1 (Hafeli)	0	1	1	0	2	1	1	X	6

Sheet H	1	2	3	4	5	6	7	8	Final
Manitoba 2 (Beaudry)	0	0	0	1	1	0	0	X	2
New Brunswick 1 (Carter) 🔨	1	1	1	0	0	1	2	X	6

Sheet I	1	2	3	4	5	6	7	8	Final
Northwest Territories (Skauge) 🔨	0	1	0	0	0	0	X	X	1
Nova Scotia 1 (Regan)	1	0	1	3	2	3	X	X	10

==== Draw 12 ====
Wednesday, February 8, 6:30 pm

Sheet A	1	2	3	4	5	6	7	8	Final
British Columbia 1 (Hafeli) 🔨	4	0	0	1	0	0	0	0	5
Ontario 2 (Padbury)	0	3	1	0	1	1	0	1	7

Sheet B	1	2	3	4	5	6	7	8	Final
Northwest Territories (Skauge) 🔨	0	1	0	0	2	0	1	0	4
New Brunswick 1 (Carter)	0	0	1	1	0	2	0	4	8

Sheet C	1	2	3	4	5	6	7	8	Final
Manitoba 2 (Beaudry) 🔨	0	1	0	0	0	2	0	2	5
Northern Ontario 2 (Dubinsky)	0	0	0	1	0	0	2	0	3

Sheet D	1	2	3	4	5	6	7	8	Final
Alberta 1 (Plett)	1	0	0	2	2	2	1	X	8
Alberta 2 (DeSchiffart) 🔨	0	0	2	0	0	0	0	X	2

Sheet E	1	2	3	4	5	6	7	8	Final
Saskatchewan 1 (Kesslering) 🔨	2	0	1	0	3	0	0	0	6
British Columbia 2 (Duncan)	0	1	0	2	0	1	2	1	7

Sheet F	1	2	3	4	5	6	7	8	Final
Nova Scotia 2 (Blades)	2	0	1	0	0	2	0	2	7
Ontario 1 (Frlan) 🔨	0	0	0	2	2	0	2	0	6

Sheet G	1	2	3	4	5	6	7	8	Final
Quebec 2 (Gionest)	1	0	4	3	0	3	X	X	11
Manitoba 1 (Wahl) 🔨	0	1	0	0	1	0	X	X	2

Sheet H	1	2	3	4	5	6	7	8	Final
Northern Ontario 1 (Toner)	0	1	2	1	0	0	0	X	4
New Brunswick 2 (Forsythe) 🔨	3	0	0	0	1	1	3	X	8

Sheet I	1	2	3	4	5	6	7	8	Final
Newfoundland and Labrador (Locke)	0	0	0	2	0	1	0	X	3
Quebec 1 (Fortin) 🔨	2	0	0	0	2	0	3	X	7

==== Draw 14 ====
Thursday, February 9, 12:30 pm

Sheet A	1	2	3	4	5	6	7	8	Final
Nova Scotia 1 (Regan) 🔨	0	0	0	0	0	0	0	X	0
Manitoba 2 (Beaudry)	0	0	1	0	1	0	2	X	4

Sheet B	1	2	3	4	5	6	7	8	Final
Northern Ontario 2 (Dubinsky)	0	0	0	0	3	0	0	X	3
Ontario 2 (Padbury) 🔨	2	0	1	1	0	2	1	X	7

Sheet C	1	2	3	4	5	6	7	8	Final
Manitoba 1 (Wahl)	0	1	0	1	0	0	2	0	4
New Brunswick 2 (Forsythe) 🔨	2	0	1	0	0	1	0	1	5

Sheet D	1	2	3	4	5	6	7	8	Final
British Columbia 1 (Hafeli) 🔨	3	4	0	1	1	0	3	X	12
New Brunswick 1 (Carter)	0	0	1	0	0	2	0	X	3

Sheet E	1	2	3	4	5	6	7	8	Final
Alberta 1 (Plett) 🔨	2	1	2	0	3	0	2	X	10
Ontario 1 (Frlan)	0	0	0	1	0	3	0	X	4

Sheet F	1	2	3	4	5	6	7	8	Final
Northern Ontario 1 (Toner) 🔨	1	1	0	1	0	1	0	2	6
Quebec 1 (Fortin)	0	0	2	0	1	0	2	0	5

Sheet G	1	2	3	4	5	6	7	8	Final
Saskatchewan 2 (Taylor) 🔨	0	3	0	1	1	0	1	2	8
Saskatchewan 1 (Kesslering)	2	0	1	0	0	1	0	0	4

Sheet H	1	2	3	4	5	6	7	8	Final
Prince Edward Island (Lenentine) 🔨	1	1	0	0	0	0	0	1	3
Quebec 2 (Gionest)	0	0	2	0	0	2	0	0	4

Sheet I	1	2	3	4	5	6	7	8	Final
British Columbia 2 (Duncan) 🔨	0	0	1	0	0	2	0	1	4
Alberta 2 (DeSchiffart)	0	0	0	1	1	0	1	0	3

=== Playoffs ===
Qualification Games
8	British Columbia 2	8
9	Northern Ontario 2	7
5	Manitoba 2	4
12	Newfoundland and Labrador	6
6	Quebec 1	5
11	Nova Scotia 1	7
7	Nova Scotia 2	8
10	Alberta 2	7

Quarterfinals
1	Alberta 1	5
8	British Columbia 2	2
4	Quebec 2	6
12	Newfoundland and Labrador	4
3	New Brunswick 2	7
11	Nova Scotia 1	5
2	British Columbia 1	3
7	Nova Scotia 2	7

Semifinals
1	Alberta 1	7
4	Quebec 2	5
3	New Brunswick 2	10
7	Nova Scotia 2	6

Final
1	Alberta 1	10
3	New Brunswick 2	1

==== Qualification games ====
Thursday, February 9, 8:30 pm

Sheet A	1	2	3	4	5	6	7	8	Final
British Columbia 2 (Duncan)	1	0	2	0	2	2	0	1	8
Northern Ontario 2 (Dubinsky) 🔨	0	2	0	4	0	0	1	0	7

Player percentages
British Columbia 2		Northern Ontario 2	
Meredith McCullum	83%	Lily Ariganello	69%
Ashley Fenton	88%	Bella McCarville	44%
Carley Hardie	78%	Rylie Paul	84%
Keelie Duncan	63%	Claire Dubinsky	64%
Total	78%	Total	65%

Sheet B	1	2	3	4	5	6	7	8	Final
Manitoba 2 (Beaudry)	0	1	1	0	0	2	0	0	4
Newfoundland and Labrador (Locke) 🔨	0	0	0	1	1	0	3	1	6

Player percentages
Manitoba 2		Newfoundland and Labrador	
Tessa Terrick	83%	Kate Young	75%
Lauren Evason	75%	Sitaye Penney	59%
Cassidy Dundas	56%	Katie Peddigrew	56%
Grace Beaudry	61%	Cailey Locke	52%
Total	69%	Total	61%

Sheet C	1	2	3	4	5	6	7	8	Final
Quebec 1 (Fortin)	0	2	0	2	0	0	0	1	5
Nova Scotia 1 (Regan) 🔨	1	0	2	0	0	2	2	0	7

Player percentages
Quebec 1		Nova Scotia 1	
Mégane Fortin	80%	Ella Kinley	88%
Megan Lafrance	84%	Ella Wilson	73%
Emy Lafrance	78%	MacKenzie Hiltz	55%
Jolianne Fortin	61%	Rebecca Regan	64%
Total	76%	Total	70%

Sheet E	1	2	3	4	5	6	7	8	9	Final
Nova Scotia 2 (Blades) 🔨	0	2	0	1	2	0	2	0	1	8
Alberta 2 (DeSchiffart)	1	0	2	0	0	2	0	2	0	7

Player percentages
Nova Scotia 2		Alberta 2	
Alexis Cluney	75%	Natalie Cholin	72%
Stephanie Atherton	78%	Abby Whitbread	67%
Kate Weissent	83%	Morgan DeSchiffart	68%
Sophie Blades	69%	Emma DeSchiffart	71%
Total	76%	Total	70%

==== Quarterfinals ====
Friday, February 10, 12:30 pm

Sheet A	1	2	3	4	5	6	7	8	Final
New Brunswick 2 (Forsythe)	1	0	2	1	0	2	0	1	7
Nova Scotia 1 (Regan) 🔨	0	2	0	0	1	0	2	0	5

Player percentages
New Brunswick 2		Nova Scotia 1	
Caylee Smith	78%	Ella Kinley	73%
Izzy Paterson	58%	Ella Wilson	66%
Rebecca Watson	84%	MacKenzie Hiltz	81%
Mélodie Forsythe	78%	Rebecca Regan	70%
Total	75%	Total	73%

Sheet B	1	2	3	4	5	6	7	8	9	Final
Alberta 1 (Plett) 🔨	2	0	0	0	0	0	0	0	3	5
British Columbia 2 (Duncan)	0	0	0	0	1	0	0	1	0	2

Player percentages
Alberta 1		British Columbia 2	
Allie Iskiw	97%	Meredith McCullum	96%
Chloe Fediuk	99%	Ashley Fenton	86%
Alyssa Nedohin	81%	Carley Hardie	92%
Myla Plett	81%	Keelie Duncan	88%
Total	90%	Total	91%

Sheet C	1	2	3	4	5	6	7	8	Final
British Columbia 1 (Hafeli) 🔨	0	0	0	2	0	1	0	X	3
Nova Scotia 2 (Blades)	0	1	1	0	3	0	2	X	7

Player percentages
British Columbia 1		Nova Scotia 2	
Natalie Hafeli	84%	Alexis Cluney	77%
Eryn Czirfusz	80%	Stephanie Atherton	81%
Jorja Kopytko	84%	Kate Weissent	88%
Holly Hafeli	68%	Sophie Blades	90%
Total	79%	Total	84%

Sheet E	1	2	3	4	5	6	7	8	Final
Quebec 2 (Gionest) 🔨	0	1	1	0	4	0	0	X	6
Newfoundland and Labrador (Locke)	1	0	0	1	0	1	1	X	4

Player percentages
Quebec 2		Newfoundland and Labrador	
Juliette Bergeron	78%	Kate Young	75%
Léanne Fortin	69%	Sitaye Penney	58%
Sarah Bergeron	55%	Katie Peddigrew	67%
Anne-Sophie Gionest	62%	Cailey Locke	61%
Total	66%	Total	65%

==== Semifinals ====
Friday, February 10, 8:30 pm

Sheet B	1	2	3	4	5	6	7	8	Final
New Brunswick 2 (Forsythe)	0	1	0	3	0	2	0	4	10
Nova Scotia 2 (Blades) 🔨	3	0	1	0	1	0	1	0	6

Player percentages
New Brunswick 2		Nova Scotia 2	
Caylee Smith	84%	Alexis Cluney	83%
Izzy Paterson	70%	Stephanie Atherton	83%
Rebecca Watson	75%	Kate Weissent	78%
Mélodie Forsythe	77%	Sophie Blades	69%
Total	77%	Total	78%

Sheet D	1	2	3	4	5	6	7	8	Final
Alberta 1 (Plett) 🔨	1	0	0	3	0	2	0	1	7
Quebec 2 (Gionest)	0	1	1	0	1	0	2	0	5

Player percentages
Alberta 1		Quebec 2	
Allie Iskiw	91%	Juliette Bergeron	80%
Chloe Fediuk	83%	Léanne Fortin	72%
Alyssa Nedohin	77%	Sarah Bergeron	83%
Myla Plett	82%	Anne-Sophie Gionest	59%
Total	83%	Total	74%

==== Final ====
Saturday, February 11, 4:30 pm

Sheet C	1	2	3	4	5	6	7	8	Final
Alberta 1 (Plett) 🔨	0	2	1	0	3	4	X	X	10
New Brunswick 2 (Forsythe)	0	0	0	1	0	0	X	X	1

Player percentages
Alberta 1		New Brunswick 2	
Allie Iskiw	77%	Caylee Smith	85%
Chloe Fediuk	85%	Izzy Paterson	54%
Alyssa Nedohin	81%	Rebecca Watson	56%
Myla Plett	77%	Mélodie Forsythe	36%
Total	80%	Total	58%

=== Consolation ===
==== A Bracket ====
For Seeds 3 to 8

Bronze medal game
4	Quebec 2	2
7	Nova Scotia 2	13

5th/6th
8	British Columbia 2	6
12	Newfoundland and Labrador	4
8	British Columbia 2	6
11	Nova Scotia 1	7
11	Nova Scotia 1	10
2	British Columbia 1	5

==== B Bracket ====
For Seeds 9 to 12

9th/10th
9	Northern Ontario 2	2
5	Manitoba 2	7
5	Manitoba 2	2
6	Quebec 1	6
6	Quebec 1	6
10	Alberta 2	4

==== C Bracket ====
For Seeds 13 to 15

Team	Skip	W	L	PF	PA
New Brunswick 1	Marlise Carter	2	0	13	8
Ontario 2	Emilie Padbury	1	1	11	11
Saskatchewan 2	Savanna Taylor	0	2	7	12

==== D Bracket ====
For Seeds 16 to 18

Team	Skip	W	L	PF	PA
Ontario 1	Katrina Frlan	2	0	14	4
Prince Edward Island	Ella Lenentine	1	1	8	7
Manitoba 1	Dayna Wahl	0	2	2	13

==== E Bracket ====
For Seeds 19 to 21

Team	Skip	W	L	PF	PA
Saskatchewan 1	Cara Kesslering	2	0	15	9
Northern Ontario 1	Mia Toner	1	1	11	9
Northwest Territories	Kali Skauge	0	2	7	15

=== Final standings ===
Place	Team
1st place, gold medalist(s)	Alberta 1
2nd place, silver medalist(s)	New Brunswick 2
3rd place, bronze medalist(s)	Nova Scotia 2
4	Quebec 2
5	Nova Scotia 1
6	British Columbia 2
7	British Columbia 1
8	Newfoundland and Labrador
9	Quebec 1
10	Manitoba 2
11	Northern Ontario 2
12	Alberta 2
13	New Brunswick 1
14	Ontario 2
15	Saskatchewan 2
16	Ontario 1
17	Prince Edward Island
18	Manitoba 1
19	Saskatchewan 1
20	Northern Ontario 1
21	Northwest Territories
