= 2018 Canadian U18 Curling Championships – Women's tournament =

2018 Canadian U18 Curling Championships Women's tournament
- Host city: Saint Andrews, New Brunswick
- Arena: W.C. O'Neill Arena Complex; Heather Curling Club
- Dates: April 9–14
- Winner: Nova Scotia
- Curling club: Lakeshore Curling Club, Lower Sackville
- Skip: Isabelle Ladouceur
- Third: Emilie Proulx
- Second: Kate Callaghan
- Lead: Makayla Harnish
- Alternate: Elsa Nauss
- Coach: Brian Rafuse
- Finalist: Saskatchewan (Skylar Ackerman)

The women's tournament of the 2018 Canadian U18 Curling Championships was held from April 9 to 14 at the W.C. O'Neill Arena Complex and Heather Curling Club in Saint Andrews, New Brunswick.

== Teams ==
The teams are listed as follows:

Province	Skip	Third	Second	Lead	Alternate	Club(s)
Alberta	Ryleigh Bakker	Hannah Phillips	Rhiley Quinn	Hannah Airey	Elysa Crough	Okotoks Curling Club, Okotoks
British Columbia	Jaelyn Cotter	Kaila Buchy	Katelyn McGillivray	Cassidy Schwaerzle		Vernon Curling Club, Vernon
Manitoba	Emma Jensen	Jaycee Terrick	Kaitlyn Szewczyk	Gracey Gulak		Dauphin Curling Club, Dauphin
New Brunswick	Erica Cluff	Ashley Cormier	Deanna MacDonald	Rachel Brewer		Woodstock Golf & Curling Club, Woodstock
New Brunswick (Host)	Vanessa Roy	Carly Smith	Melodie Forsythe	Caylee Smith		Curl Moncton, Moncton
Newfoundland and Labrador	Mackenzie Glynn	Katie Follett	Sarah Chaytor	Camille Burt		St. John's Curling Club, St. John's
Northern Ontario	Bella Croisier	Jamie Smith	Lauren Rajala	Piper Croisier		Idylwylde Golf & Country Club, Sudbury
Northwest Territories	Zoey Walsh	Julie Squries-Rowe	Nicole Griffiths	Katherine Lenoir		Hay River Curling Club, Hay River
Nova Scotia	Isabelle Ladouceur	Emilie Proulx	Kate Callaghan	Makayla Harnish	Elsa Nauss	Lakeshore Curling Club, Lower Sackville
Ontario	Madelyn Warriner	Sarah Bailey	Brianne Donegan	Shannon Warriner		Listowel Curling Club, Listowel
Prince Edward Island	Lauren Ferguson	Katie Shaw	Alexis Burris	Lexie Murray		Cornwall Curling Club, Cornwall
Quebec	Annkatrin Perron	Alexia Perron	Chloé Munger	Desneiges Pruneau	Claudia Racine	Kénogami Curling Club, Jonquière
Saskatchewan	Skylar Ackerman	Madison Johnson	Chantel Hoag	Samantha McLaren		Moose Jaw Ford Curling Centre, Moose Jaw
Yukon	Bayly Scoffin	Karen Smallwood	Robyn McNeil	Alexa Smallwood		Whitehorse Curling Club, Whitehorse

== Round Robin Standings ==
Final Round Robin Standings

Key
Teams to Knockout Round

Pool A	Skip	W	L
Ontario	Madelyn Warriner	5	1
New Brunswick	Erica Cluff	5	1
Saskatchewan	Skylar Ackerman	4	2
British Columbia	Jaelyn Cotter	3	3
Prince Edward Island	Lauren Ferguson	3	3
Northwest Territories	Zoey Walsh	1	5
Yukon	Bayly Scoffin	0	6

Pool B	Skip	W	L
Alberta	Ryleigh Bakker	5	1
Northern Ontario	Bella Croisier	4	2
Quebec	Annkatrin Perron	4	2
Nova Scotia	Isabelle Ladouceur	3	3
New Brunswick (Host)	Vanessa Roy	3	3
Newfoundland and Labrador	Mackenzie Glynn	2	4
Manitoba	Emma Jensen	0	6

== Round Robin Results ==
All draw times are listed in Atlantic Time (UTC−04:00).

=== Pool A ===
==== Draw 1 ====
Tuesday, April 9, 6:00 pm

Sheet A	1	2	3	4	5	6	7	8	Final
Yukon (Scoffin)	0	0	2	1	1	0	0	X	4
Northwest Territories (Walsh)	4	2	0	0	0	2	1	X	9

Sheet F	1	2	3	4	5	6	7	8	Final
British Columbia (Cotter)	0	1	1	0	0	0	2	X	4
Saskatchewan (Ackerman)	3	0	0	0	3	1	0	X	7

==== Draw 2 ====
Wednesday, April 10, 10:00 am

Sheet E	1	2	3	4	5	6	7	8	Final
British Columbia (Cotter)	0	0	0	0	1	0	1	0	2
Ontario (Warriner)	0	0	2	1	0	1	0	1	5

Sheet H	1	2	3	4	5	6	7	8	Final
Yukon (Scoffin)	0	2	0	0	1	0	1	X	4
Prince Edward Island (Ferguson)	1	0	1	2	0	4	0	X	8

==== Draw 3 ====
Wednesday, April 10, 2:00 pm

Sheet A	1	2	3	4	5	6	7	8	Final
New Brunswick (Cluff)	0	0	0	2	0	0	1	1	4
Ontario (Warriner)	0	3	0	0	1	1	0	0	5

Sheet B	1	2	3	4	5	6	7	8	Final
Northwest Territories (Walsh)	1	0	0	1	0	0	0	X	2
Saskatchewan (Ackerman)	0	3	0	0	2	1	4	X	10

==== Draw 4 ====
Wednesday, April 10, 6:00 pm

Sheet A	1	2	3	4	5	6	7	8	Final
Prince Edward Island (Ferguson)	1	0	0	1	1	0	0	0	3
British Columbia (Cotter)	0	1	1	0	0	1	1	1	5

Sheet E	1	2	3	4	5	6	7	8	Final
New Brunswick (Cluff)	0	2	3	3	1	0	X	X	9
Yukon (Scoffin)	1	0	0	0	0	1	X	X	2

==== Draw 5 ====
Thursday, April 11, 10:00 am

Sheet C	1	2	3	4	5	6	7	8	Final
Saskatchewan (Ackerman)	1	1	0	0	2	0	1	0	5
Ontario (Warriner)	0	0	1	3	0	0	0	2	6

Sheet D	1	2	3	4	5	6	7	8	Final
Northwest Territories (Walsh)	0	0	0	0	0	1	X	X	1
New Brunswick (Cluff)	1	5	1	1	2	0	X	X	10

==== Draw 6 ====
Thursday, April 11, 2:00 pm

Sheet B	1	2	3	4	5	6	7	8	Final
British Columbia (Cotter)	2	2	2	0	3	2	X	X	11
Yukon (Scoffin)	0	0	0	3	0	0	X	X	3

Sheet B	1	2	3	4	5	6	7	8	Final
Prince Edward Island (Ferguson)	0	1	0	0	0	1	3	0	5
New Brunswick (Cluff)	2	0	1	0	1	0	0	4	8

==== Draw 7 ====
Thursday, April 11, 6:00 pm

Sheet D	1	2	3	4	5	6	7	8	Final
Saskatchewan (Ackerman)	0	1	0	0	2	0	0	4	7
Prince Edward Island (Ferguson)	0	0	1	1	0	1	0	0	3

Sheet H	1	2	3	4	5	6	7	8	Final
Ontario (Warriner)	0	4	0	4	2	1	X	X	11
Northwest Territories (Walsh)	1	0	1	0	0	0	X	X	2

==== Draw 8 ====
Friday, April 12, 10:00 am

Sheet B	1	2	3	4	5	6	7	8	Final
New Brunswick (Cluff)	1	1	0	1	1	0	0	1	5
British Columbia (Cotter)	0	0	1	0	0	0	1	0	2

Sheet C	1	2	3	4	5	6	7	8	Final
Prince Edward Island (Ferguson)	4	0	3	1	0	2	0	X	10
Northwest Territories (Walsh)	0	2	0	0	2	0	1	X	5

Sheet G	1	2	3	4	5	6	7	8	Final
Saskatchewan (Ackerman)	1	1	4	3	3	3	X	X	11
Yukon (Scoffin)	0	0	0	0	0	0	X	X	0

==== Draw 9 ====
Friday, April 12, 2:00 pm

Sheet E	1	2	3	4	5	6	7	8	9	Final
Saskatchewan (Ackerman)	0	0	0	1	0	1	0	1	0	3
New Brunswick (Cluff)	2	0	0	0	0	0	1	0	1	4

Sheet G	1	2	3	4	5	6	7	8	Final
Ontario (Warriner)	0	0	1	0	2	0	2	0	5
Prince Edward Island (Ferguson)	0	1	0	3	0	1	0	1	6

==== Draw 10 ====
Friday, April 12, 6:00 pm

Sheet D	1	2	3	4	5	6	7	8	Final
Yukon (Scoffin)	0	0	1	0	1	0	X	X	2
Ontario (Warriner)	3	3	0	6	0	3	X	X	15

Sheet F	1	2	3	4	5	6	7	8	Final
Northwest Territories (Walsh)	0	0	0	1	0	1	X	X	2
British Columbia (Cotter)	2	1	2	0	2	0	X	X	7

=== Pool B ===
==== Draw 1 ====
Tuesday, April 9, 6:00 pm

Sheet C	1	2	3	4	5	6	7	8	Final
New Brunswick Host (Roy)	1	0	0	1	0	0	X	X	2
Quebec (Perron)	0	2	2	0	3	1	X	X	8

Sheet D	1	2	3	4	5	6	7	8	Final
Manitoba (Jensen)	0	0	1	0	2	1	0	X	4
Northern Ontario (Croisier)	1	1	0	2	0	0	3	X	7

Sheet G	1	2	3	4	5	6	7	8	Final
Nova Scotia (Ladouceur)	0	0	2	0	0	0	0	2	4
Alberta (Bakker)	2	0	0	0	0	0	1	0	3

==== Draw 2 ====
Wednesday, April 10, 10:00 am

Sheet F	1	2	3	4	5	6	7	8	Final
Newfoundland and Labrador (Glynn)	0	2	0	2	1	0	1	0	6
New Brunswick Host (Roy)	1	0	1	0	0	4	0	1	7

==== Draw 3 ====
Wednesday, April 10, 2:00 pm

Sheet E	1	2	3	4	5	6	7	8	Final
Northern Ontario (Croisier)	0	0	2	2	0	3	0	1	8
Nova Scotia (Ladouceur)	0	2	0	0	1	0	2	0	5

Sheet H	1	2	3	4	5	6	7	8	Final
Quebec (Perron)	1	0	1	2	1	0	0	3	8
Manitoba (Jensen)	0	1	0	0	0	2	2	0	5

==== Draw 4 ====
Wednesday, April 10, 6:00 pm

Sheet B	1	2	3	4	5	6	7	8	Final
Northern Ontario (Croisier)	0	2	0	0	0	1	0	2	5
Newfoundland and Labrador (Glynn)	0	0	0	1	1	0	1	0	3

Sheet C	1	2	3	4	5	6	7	8	Final
Alberta (Bakker)	0	2	0	0	1	1	2	X	6
Manitoba (Jensen)	1	0	1	0	0	0	0	X	2

Sheet H	1	2	3	4	5	6	7	8	Final
Nova Scotia (Ladouceur)	1	2	3	1	1	0	X	X	8
New Brunswick Host (Roy)	0	0	0	0	0	2	X	X	2

==== Draw 5 ====
Thursday, April 11, 10:00 am

Sheet A	1	2	3	4	5	6	7	8	9	Final
Quebec (Perron)	0	0	1	0	0	0	2	0	1	4
Nova Scotia (Ladouceur)	0	1	0	0	0	1	0	1	0	3

Sheet B	1	2	3	4	5	6	7	8	Final
New Brunswick Host (Roy)	0	2	0	2	0	0	1	X	5
Alberta (Bakker)	4	0	1	0	0	2	0	X	7

==== Draw 6 ====
Thursday, April 11, 2:00 pm

Sheet C	1	2	3	4	5	6	7	8	9	Final
Manitoba (Jensen)	0	0	0	2	2	0	1	1	0	6
New Brunswick Host (Roy)	2	1	1	0	0	2	0	0	1	7

==== Draw 7 ====
Thursday, April 11, 6:00 pm

Sheet F	1	2	3	4	5	6	7	8	Final
Quebec (Perron)	0	2	0	3	0	2	0	X	7
Newfoundland and Labrador (Glynn)	1	0	1	0	1	0	1	X	4

Sheet G	1	2	3	4	5	6	7	8	Final
Alberta (Bakker)	0	1	0	2	0	2	2	X	7
Northern Ontario (Croisier)	1	0	1	0	1	0	0	X	3

==== Draw 8 ====
Friday, April 12, 10:00 am

Sheet D	1	2	3	4	5	6	7	8	Final
Northern Ontario (Croisier)	1	0	3	0	0	0	1	X	5
Quebec (Perron)	0	1	0	1	1	0	0	X	3

Sheet E	1	2	3	4	5	6	7	8	Final
Manitoba (Jensen)	0	0	0	1	0	1	0	X	2
Nova Scotia (Ladouceur)	0	3	0	0	4	0	2	X	9

Sheet H	1	2	3	4	5	6	7	8	Final
Newfoundland and Labrador (Glynn)	1	2	0	0	0	0	0	X	3
Alberta (Bakker)	0	0	1	1	3	1	2	X	8

==== Draw 9 ====
Friday, April 12, 2:00 pm

Sheet D	1	2	3	4	5	6	7	8	Final
Nova Scotia (Ladouceur)	0	0	2	0	2	0	0	0	4
Newfoundland and Labrador (Glynn)	2	0	0	1	0	0	2	1	6

==== Draw 10 ====
Friday, April 12, 6:00 pm

Sheet A	1	2	3	4	5	6	7	8	Final
Alberta (Bakker)	0	2	0	0	1	0	3	X	6
Quebec (Perron)	0	0	0	1	0	1	0	X	2

Sheet B	1	2	3	4	5	6	7	8	Final
Newfoundland and Labrador (Glynn)	0	2	0	0	2	0	0	2	6
Manitoba (Jensen)	1	0	0	1	0	1	1	0	4

Sheet E	1	2	3	4	5	6	7	8	Final
New Brunswick Host (Roy)	0	2	1	0	2	0	1	X	6
Northern Ontario (Croisier)	2	0	0	1	0	1	0	X	4

== Knockout round ==
=== A Bracket ===
Qualifier 1
A1	Ontario	4
B4	Nova Scotia	1
A1	Ontario	5
A2	New Brunswick	4
A2	New Brunswick	8
B3	Quebec	6

Qualifier 2
B2	Northern Ontario	4
A3	Saskatchewan	8
A3	Saskatchewan	8
A4	British Columbia	4
B1	Alberta	8
A4	British Columbia	10

==== A Semifinals ====
Saturday, April 13, 12:30 pm

Sheet B	1	2	3	4	5	6	7	8	Final
Ontario (Warriner)	0	0	1	0	1	2	0	X	4
Nova Scotia (Ladouceur)	0	0	0	0	0	0	1	X	1

Sheet C	1	2	3	4	5	6	7	8	Final
New Brunswick (Cluff)	2	0	2	0	3	0	1	0	8
Quebec (Perron)	0	4	0	1	0	0	0	1	6

Sheet D	1	2	3	4	5	6	7	8	9	Final
Northern Ontario (Croisier)	0	1	0	2	0	0	0	1	0	4
Saskatchewan (Ackerman)	0	0	1	0	2	1	0	0	4	8

Sheet E	1	2	3	4	5	6	7	8	9	Final
Alberta (Bakker)	4	3	0	1	0	0	0	0	0	8
British Columbia (Cotter)	0	0	2	0	2	2	1	1	2	10

==== A Finals ====
Saturday, April 13, 7:30 pm

Sheet C	1	2	3	4	5	6	7	8	Final
Saskatchewan (Ackerman)	3	0	2	0	2	1	0	X	8
British Columbia (Cotter)	0	1	0	2	0	0	1	X	4

Sheet D	1	2	3	4	5	6	7	8	Final
Ontario (Warriner)	0	0	0	1	0	1	1	2	5
New Brunswick (Cluff)	1	2	0	0	1	0	0	0	4

=== B Bracket ===
			Qualifier 3
			A2	New Brunswick	4
B2	Northern Ontario	5	B1	Alberta	6
B1	Alberta	6

			Qualifier 4
			A4	British Columbia	3
B4	Nova Scotia	6	B4	Nova Scotia	8
B3	Quebec	4

==== B Semifinals ====
Saturday, April 13, 7:30 pm

Sheet B	1	2	3	4	5	6	7	8	Final
Northern Ontario (Croisier)	0	2	0	0	0	0	1	2	5
Alberta (Bakker)	1	0	2	0	3	0	0	0	6

Sheet E	1	2	3	4	5	6	7	8	Final
Nova Scotia (Ladouceur)	1	0	1	0	4	0	0	X	6
Quebec (Perron)	0	2	0	1	0	0	1	X	4

==== B Finals ====
Sunday, April 14, 9:00 am

Sheet B	1	2	3	4	5	6	7	8	Final
British Columbia (Cotter)	0	2	0	0	0	1	0	X	3
Nova Scotia (Ladouceur)	0	0	3	2	1	0	2	X	8

Sheet C	1	2	3	4	5	6	7	8	Final
New Brunswick (Cluff)	0	0	0	1	1	0	2	X	4
Alberta (Bakker)	1	0	1	0	0	4	0	X	6

=== Playoffs ===
Semifinals
1	Ontario	5
4	Nova Scotia	7
2	Saskatchewan	6
3	Alberta	5

Final
4	Nova Scotia	6
2	Saskatchewan	3

Bronze medal game
1	Ontario	3
3	Alberta	5

==== Semifinals ====
Sunday, April 14, 1:30 pm

Sheet B	1	2	3	4	5	6	7	8	9	Final
Saskatchewan (Ackerman)	0	1	0	1	0	1	0	2	1	6
Alberta (Bakker)	0	0	2	0	1	0	2	0	0	5

Player percentages
Saskatchewan		Alberta	
Samantha McLaren	63%	Hannah Airey	69%
Chantel Hoag	74%	Rhiley Quinn	82%
Madison Johnson	75%	Hannah Phillips	82%
Skylar Ackerman	74%	Ryleigh Bakker	74%
Total	71%	Total	77%

Sheet C	1	2	3	4	5	6	7	8	Final
Ontario (Warriner)	0	1	0	2	0	2	0	0	5
Nova Scotia (Ladouceur)	1	0	3	0	1	0	0	2	7

Player percentages
Ontario		Nova Scotia	
Shannon Warriner	92%	Makayla Harnish	77%
Brianne Donegan	88%	Kate Callaghan	84%
Sarah Bailey	91%	Emilie Proulx	78%
Madelyn Warriner	73%	Isabelle Ladouceur	82%
Total	86%	Total	80%

==== Bronze medal game ====
Sunday, April 14, 6:00 pm

Sheet E	1	2	3	4	5	6	7	8	Final
Ontario (Warriner)	0	1	0	0	0	1	1	0	3
Alberta (Bakker)	0	0	0	1	1	0	0	3	5

Player percentages
Ontario		Alberta	
Shannon Warriner	75%	Hannah Airey	86%
Brianne Donegan	72%	Rhiley Quinn	88%
Sarah Bailey	72%	Hannah Phillips	80%
Madelyn Warriner	73%	Ryleigh Bakker	72%
Total	73%	Total	81%

==== Final ====
Sunday, April 14, 6:00 pm

Sheet D	1	2	3	4	5	6	7	8	Final
Nova Scotia (Ladouceur)	0	0	0	0	2	2	0	2	6
Saskatchewan (Ackerman)	0	0	0	2	0	0	1	0	3

Player percentages
Nova Scotia		Saskatchewan	
Makayla Harnish	82%	Samantha McLaren	66%
Kate Callaghan	81%	Chantel Hoag	75%
Emilie Proulx	70%	Madison Johnson	75%
Isabelle Ladouceur	91%	Skylar Ackerman	67%
Total	81%	Total	71%
