= 2018 Canadian U18 Curling Championships =

- Host city: Saint Andrews, New Brunswick
- Arena: W.C. O'Neill Arena Complex & Heather Curling Club
- Dates: April 9–14
- Men's winner: Nova Scotia
- Curling club: Chester Curling Club, Chester
- Skip: Graeme Weagle
- Fourth: Owen Purcell
- Second: Jeffrey Meagher
- Lead: Scott Weagle
- Coach: Anthony Purcell
- Finalist: Alberta (Jacques)
- Women's winner: Nova Scotia
- Curling club: Lakeshore Curling Club, Lower Sackville
- Skip: Isabelle Ladouceur
- Third: Emilie Proulx
- Second: Kate Callaghan
- Lead: Makayla Harnish
- Alternate: Elsa Nauss
- Coach: Brian Rafuse
- Finalist: Saskatchewan (Ackerman)

The 2018 Canadian U18 Curling Championships was held from April 9 to 14 at the W.C. O'Neill Arena Complex and Heather Curling Club in Saint Andrews, New Brunswick.

== Men ==
=== Round Robin Standings ===
Final Round Robin Standings

Key
Teams to Knockout Round

Pool A	Skip	W	L
Manitoba	Brett Walter	4	1
Nova Scotia	Graeme Weagle	3	2
Ontario	Joshua Leung	3	2
Alberta	Ryan Jacques	3	2
Saskatchewan	Jayden Bindig	2	3
Northwest Territories	Adam Naugler	0	5

Pool B	Skip	W	L
Northern Ontario	Jacob Horgan	5	0
Newfoundland and Labrador	Ryan McNeil Lamswood	4	1
Quebec	Jérôme Adam	3	2
New Brunswick	Liam Marin	2	3
British Columbia	Dawson Ballard	1	4
Prince Edward Island	Mitchell Schut	0	5

=== Knockout round ===
==== A Bracket ====
Qualifier 1
A1	Manitoba	7
B4	New Brunswick	2
A1	Manitoba	6
A2	Nova Scotia	7
A2	Nova Scotia	8
B3	Quebec	2

Qualifier 2
B2	Newfoundland and Labrador	3
A3	Ontario	2
B2	Newfoundland and Labrador	4
A4	Alberta	7
B1	Northern Ontario	4
A4	Alberta	6

==== B Bracket ====
Semifinals			Qualifier 3
			A1	Manitoba	5
A3	Ontario	2	B1	Northern Ontario	6
B1	Northern Ontario	4

			Qualifier 4
			B2	Newfoundland and Labrador	4
B4	New Brunswick	6	B4	New Brunswick	2
B3	Quebec	0

=== Playoffs ===
Semifinals
1	Nova Scotia	6
4	Newfoundland and Labrador	2
2	Alberta	5
3	Northern Ontario	2

Final
1	Nova Scotia	10
2	Alberta	6

Bronze medal game
3	Northern Ontario	4
4	Newfoundland and Labrador	1

==== Semifinals ====
Sheet D	1	2	3	4	5	6	7	8	Final
Alberta (Jacques)	1	0	2	0	2	0	0	X	5
Northern Ontario (Horgan)	0	2	0	0	0	0	0	X	2

Player percentages
Alberta		Northern Ontario	
Mike Henricks	82%	Shane Robinson	77%
Gabriel Dyck	83%	Nick Bissonnette	77%
Dustin Mikush	86%	Max Cull	78%
Ryan Jacques	87%	Jacob Horgan	90%
Total	84%	Total	80%

Sheet E	1	2	3	4	5	6	7	8	Final
Nova Scotia (Weagle)	1	0	2	0	0	2	1	X	6
Newfoundland and Labrador (McNeil Lamswood)	0	1	0	0	1	0	0	X	2

Player percentages
Nova Scotia		Newfoundland and Labrador	
Scott Weagle	79%	Alex Phillips	89%
Jeffrey Meagher	72%	James Trickett	84%
Graeme Weagle	83%	Coleton Vriesendorp	80%
Owen Purcell	93%	Ryan McNeil Lamswood	71%
Total	81%	Total	82%

==== Bronze medal game ====
Sheet B	1	2	3	4	5	6	7	8	Final
Northern Ontario (Horgan)	0	1	0	0	0	2	0	1	4
Newfoundland and Labrador (McNeil Lamswood)	0	0	0	0	1	0	0	0	1

Player percentages
Northern Ontario		Newfoundland and Labrador	
Shane Robinson	86%	Alex Phillips	92%
Nick Bissonnette	83%	James Trickett	77%
Max Cull	64%	Coleton Vriesendorp	66%
Jacob Horgan	86%	Ryan McNeil Lamswood	73%
Total	80%	Total	77%

==== Final ====
Sheet C	1	2	3	4	5	6	7	8	Final
Nova Scotia (Weagle)	2	0	5	3	0	0	0	X	10
Alberta (Jacques)	0	1	0	0	2	2	1	X	6

Player percentages
Nova Scotia		Alberta	
Scott Weagle	89%	Mike Henricks	97%
Jeffrey Meagher	89%	Gabriel Dyck	94%
Graeme Weagle	91%	Dustin Mikush	78%
Owen Purcell	68%	Ryan Jacques	75%
Total	84%	Total	86%

== Women ==
=== Round Robin Standings ===
Final Round Robin Standings

Key
Teams to Knockout Round

Pool A	Skip	W	L
Ontario	Madelyn Warriner	5	1
New Brunswick	Erica Cluff	5	1
Saskatchewan	Skylar Ackerman	4	2
British Columbia	Jaelyn Cotter	3	3
Prince Edward Island	Lauren Ferguson	3	3
Northwest Territories	Zoey Walsh	1	5
Yukon	Bayly Scoffin	0	6

Pool B	Skip	W	L
Alberta	Ryleigh Bakker	5	1
Northern Ontario	Bella Croisier	4	2
Quebec	Annkatrin Perron	4	2
Nova Scotia	Isabelle Ladouceur	3	3
New Brunswick (Host)	Vanessa Roy	3	3
Newfoundland and Labrador	Mackenzie Glynn	2	4
Manitoba	Emma Jensen	0	6

=== Knockout round ===
==== A Bracket ====
Qualifier 1
A1	Ontario	4
B4	Nova Scotia	1
A1	Ontario	5
A2	New Brunswick	4
A2	New Brunswick	8
B3	Quebec	6

Qualifier 2
B2	Northern Ontario	4
A3	Saskatchewan	8
A3	Saskatchewan	8
A4	British Columbia	4
B1	Alberta	8
A4	British Columbia	10

==== B Bracket ====
			Qualifier 3
			A2	New Brunswick	4
B2	Northern Ontario	5	B1	Alberta	6
B1	Alberta	6

			Qualifier 4
			A4	British Columbia	3
B4	Nova Scotia	6	B4	Nova Scotia	8
B3	Quebec	4

=== Playoffs ===
Semifinals
1	Ontario	5
4	Nova Scotia	7
2	Saskatchewan	6
3	Alberta	5

Final
4	Nova Scotia	6
2	Saskatchewan	3

Bronze medal game
1	Ontario	3
3	Alberta	5

==== Semifinals ====
Sheet B	1	2	3	4	5	6	7	8	9	Final
Saskatchewan (Ackerman)	0	1	0	1	0	1	0	2	1	6
Alberta (Bakker)	0	0	2	0	1	0	2	0	0	5

Player percentages
Saskatchewan		Alberta	
Samantha McLaren	63%	Hannah Airey	69%
Chantel Hoag	74%	Rhiley Quinn	82%
Madison Johnson	75%	Hannah Phillips	82%
Skylar Ackerman	74%	Ryleigh Bakker	74%
Total	71%	Total	77%

Sheet C	1	2	3	4	5	6	7	8	Final
Ontario (Warriner)	0	1	0	2	0	2	0	0	5
Nova Scotia (Ladouceur)	1	0	3	0	1	0	0	2	7

Player percentages
Ontario		Nova Scotia	
Shannon Warriner	92%	Makayla Harnish	77%
Brianne Donegan	88%	Kate Callaghan	84%
Sarah Bailey	91%	Emilie Proulx	78%
Madelyn Warriner	73%	Isabelle Ladouceur	82%
Total	86%	Total	80%

==== Bronze medal game ====
Sheet E	1	2	3	4	5	6	7	8	Final
Ontario (Warriner)	0	1	0	0	0	1	1	0	3
Alberta (Bakker)	0	0	0	1	1	0	0	3	5

Player percentages
Ontario		Alberta	
Shannon Warriner	75%	Hannah Airey	86%
Brianne Donegan	72%	Rhiley Quinn	88%
Sarah Bailey	72%	Hannah Phillips	80%
Madelyn Warriner	73%	Ryleigh Bakker	72%
Total	73%	Total	81%

==== Final ====
Sheet D	1	2	3	4	5	6	7	8	Final
Nova Scotia (Ladouceur)	0	0	0	0	2	2	0	2	6
Saskatchewan (Ackerman)	0	0	0	2	0	0	1	0	3

Player percentages
Nova Scotia		Saskatchewan	
Makayla Harnish	82%	Samantha McLaren	66%
Kate Callaghan	81%	Chantel Hoag	75%
Emilie Proulx	70%	Madison Johnson	75%
Isabelle Ladouceur	91%	Skylar Ackerman	67%
Total	81%	Total	71%
