= McIntyre Community Building =

Building in Ontario, Canada

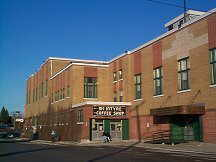
McIntyre Community Building

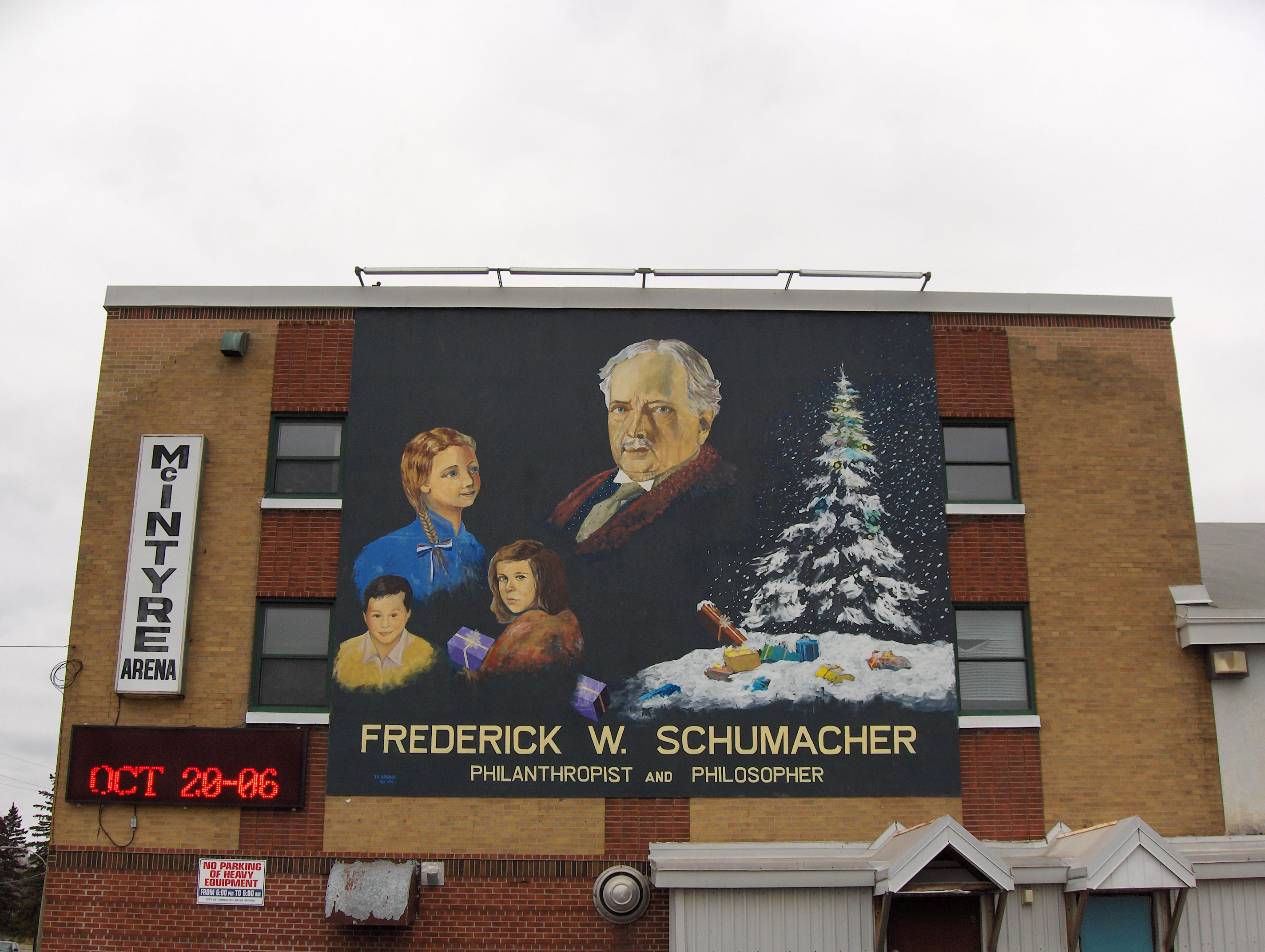
A billboard on the McIntyre Community Building.

The McIntyre Community Building is an arena in Timmins, Ontario, Canada. The arena (commonly known as the "Mac") contains approximately 1300 seats and has a total capacity of 1931 including standing room. It is currently home to the Timmins Majors AAA Midget Hockey Club which plays in the Great North Midget Hockey League and the Timmins Rock hockey club which plays in the Northern Ontario Junior Hockey League.

The arena was opened in 1938. J. P. Bickell, the chairman of McIntyre-Porcupine Mines was one of the builders of Maple Leaf Gardens in Toronto. Bickell built the arena for the employees of the mine, and open to the general public. It was unique, constructed with an artificial ice surface, one of few in Ontario. It was used for ice hockey and figure skating. The provision of artificial ice meant the arena had a longer season of use, and was used for regional events, such as an annual skating carnival. The facility meant that Timmins was a regional centre for ice hockey and figure skating. Professional ice hockey players such as Frank and Peter Mahovlich, Dean Prentice, Bob Nevin, Allan Stanley and Bill Barilko developed their skills at the McIntyre. World champion figure skater Barbara Ann Scott also trained at the McIntyre in the summer.

In January 2008, a "McIntyre Ad Hoc Committee" was formed to examine ways to reduce the operating deficit and explore possible upgrades to the aging building. Some of the recent renovations include the replacement of all of the arena seats, the installation of a new centre ice scoreboard, and a refurbished box office. The McIntyre Arena was the main venue for the 2010 World U-17 Hockey Challenge held between December 29, 2009, and January 4, 2010.

The arena's seating capacity (approx. 1,300) is small by today's standards for a city the size of Timmins (pop. approx. 45,000). Most communities of comparable size in Canada have a main arena seating capacity in the 3,000-5,000 range. In order to host a junior hockey team or other major tenant, the city may need to expand the Mac and triple its seating capacity to approx. 4,000 seats. This would facilitate larger events such as concerts, ice shows, and other sporting events.
