= Lakeshore Curling Club =

Curling club in Lower Sackville, Nova Scotia

- Location: 7-409 Glendale Dr; Lower Sackville, Nova Scotia, Canada

Information
- Established: 2003
- Club type: Dedicated Ice
- Curling Canada region: NSCA
- Sheets of ice: 6
- Rock colours: Blue and Yellow
- Website: lakeshorecurlingclub.com

The Lakeshore Curling Club is a curling club located in the Lower Sackville community of the Halifax Regional Municipality, Nova Scotia, Canada. The club is located at the Sackville Sports Stadium.

== History ==
A curling centre was opened in Lower Sackville in 2000, and the club was established in 2003.

The club won the women's Canadian Curling Club Championships in 2024, the first title for a club from Nova Scotia.

== Wheelchair curling ==
In addition to regular curling, the club has a wheelchair curling program, which began in 2001. It is the only curling facility in the province with a wheelchair curling coaching program. The program was severely threatened during the COVID-19 pandemic in Nova Scotia, seeing its membership drop by more than two-thirds.

== Events ==
The club hosted The Curling Store Cashspiel, a former World Curling Tour event. The club also hosted the 2009 Canadian Wheelchair Curling Championship.

== Provincial champions ==
Teams from the Lakeshore Curling Club have won provincial championships several times:

=== Men's ===
Teams from the Lakeshore Curling Club have won the Nova Scotia Tankard two times, earning the right to represent Nova Scotia at the Brier, Canada's national men's championship.

Year	Team	Brier record
2013	Ian Fitzner-Leblanc, Paul Flemming (skip), Graham Breckon, Kelly Mittelstadt	1–10
2014	Jamie Murphy, Jordan Pinder, Mike Bardsley, Donald McDermaid	0–11

=== Junior women's ===
Teams from the Lakeshore Curling Club have won the provincial women's junior championships once, earning the right to represent Nova Scotia at the Canadian Junior Curling Championships.

Year	Team	Jrs Record
2006	Sarah Rhyno, Jenn Brine, Jessica Bradford, Heather Ross	(bronze) 8–5

=== Senior men's ===
Teams from the Lakeshore Curling Club have won the provincial senior men's championship once, earning the right to represent Nova Scotia at the Canadian Senior Curling Championships.

Year	Team	Srs record
2010	Brian Rafuse, Curt Palmer, Alan Darragh, Dave Slauenwhite	6–5

=== U18 women's ===
Teams from the Lakeshore Curling Club have won the provincial under 18 women's championships three times, earning the right to represent Nova Scotia at the Canadian U18 Curling Championships. The club won the national title in 2018.

Year	Team	U18s record
2018	Isabelle Ladouceur, Emilie Proulx, Kate Callaghan, Makayla Harnish	(gold) 7–4
2023	Rebecca Regan, MacKenzie Hiltz, Ella Wilson, Ella Kinley	6–4
2024	Rebecca Regan, Olivia McDonah, MacKenzie Hiltz, Ella Kinley	7–2

=== Wheelchair ===
Owing to the club's wheelchair curling program, teams from the Lakeshore have won every single provincial title since 2009. The club did not send a team to the 2024 Canadian Wheelchair Curling Championship due to diminishing numbers in the wheelchair program at the club.

=== Women's Curling Club championships ===
Teams from the Lakeshore Curling Club have won the women's provincial curling club championships four times, earning the right to represent Nova Scotia at the Canadian Curling Club Championships.

Year	Team	Natl record
2017	Denise Fitzgerald, Michelle Williams, Mary Porter, Abby Miller	5–2
2018	Michelle Williams, Mary Porter, Abby Miller, Kathleen Porter	(bronze) 5–3
2024	Michelle Armstrong, Julie McEvoy, Abby Miller, Kathleen Porter	(gold) 8–2
2026	Michelle Armstrong, Mary Mason, Abby Miller, Julie McEvoy	
