= U18 New Brunswick Curling Championships =

The U18 New Brunswick Curling Championships is the provincial under-18 men's and women's curling championship for New Brunswick, run by the New Brunswick Curling Association. The winning team each year represents New Brunswick at the Canadian U18 Curling Championships.

== Past Champions ==
=== Men ===
Year	Winning team	Runner up team	Record at Nationals
2024	Sahil Dalrymple, James Watson, Jayden Colwell, Ron-Allen Elsinga	Michael Hughes, Graydon Andrew, Evan Hanson, Jack Hoyt	Dalrymple 5–3 (7th); Hughes 1–7 (20th) (Note: Two teams competed in the national championship.)
2023	Timothy Marin, Rajan Dalrymple, Emmett Knee, Cameron Sallaj	Luke Robichaud, James Carr, Austen Matheson, Aiden Matheson	Marin 6–3 (4th); Robichaud 3–5 (19th)
2022	Rajan Dalrymple, John Siddall, Tye Dacey, Cameron Sallaj	Timothy Marin, Jamie Stewart, Samuel Goodine, Emmett Knee	Dalrymple 3–5 (13th); Marin 3–5 (12th)
2021	Cancelled		
2020	Emmanuel Porter, Noah Riggs, Ethan Legge, Connor Carter	Logan Pugsley, Riley Dowden, Jacob Nowlan, Cameron Sallaj	N/A due to COVID-19
2019	Josh Nowlan, Wil Robertson, Isaiah Downey, Jacob Nowlan	Emmanuel Porter, Alex Peasley, Logan Pugsley, Rajan Dalrymple	5–4 (T–5th)
2018	Liam Marin, Adam Tracy, Dylan MacDonald, Josh Vaughan	Emmanuel Porter, Rajan Dalrymple, Logan Pugsley, Noah Riggs	3–5 (T–5th)
2017	Liam Marin, Adam Tracy, Donovan Lanteigne, Matt Magee	Coady Lewis, Trevor Standen, Wil Robertson, Josh Goguen	3–2 (7th)

=== Women ===
Year	Winning team	Runner up team	Record at Nationals
2024	Mya Pugsley, Mia West, Hannah Williams, Ashley Siddall	Maizie Carter, Avery Colwell, Gabrielle King, Genevieve Mason	Pugsley 5–4 (10th); Carter 3–5 (14th)
2023	Lauren Price (Fourth), Marlise Carter (Skip), Summer Merrithew, Morgan Finley	Melodie Forsythe, Rebecca Watson, Izzy Paterson, Caylee Smith	Carter 5–3 (13th); Forsythe 7–2 (2nd)
2022	Celia Evans, Marlise Carter, Julia Evans, Sierra Tracy	Sarah Gaines, Leah Cluff, Carly Smith, Ashley Coughlan	Evans 2–6 (15th); Gaines 6–3 (5th)
2021	Cancelled		
2020	Melodie Forsythe, Carly Smith, Deanna MacDonald, Caylee Smith	Laura Guzik (Fourth), Jenna Campbell (Skip), Izzy Paterson, Rebecca Watson	N/A due to COVID-19
2019	Melodie Forsythe, Carly Smith, Vanessa Roy, Caylee Smith	Brooke Tracy, Kirsten Donovan, Kamdyn Cawdle, Sierra Tracy	5–6 (4th)
2018	Erica Cluff, Ashley Cormier, Deanna MacDonald, Rachel Brewer	Vanessa Roy, Carly Smith, Melodie Forsythe, Caylee Smith	Cluff 6–3 (T–5th); Roy 3–3 (T–9th)
2017	Justine Comeau, Emma Le Blanc, Brigitte Comeau, Keira McLaughlin	Kamryn Smith, Hannah Lazaris-Decken, Julie Brannen, Brooke Archibald	8–2 (2nd)
