= 2019 Canadian U18 Curling Championships – Women's tournament =

2019 Canadian U18 Curling Championships Women's tournament
- Host city: Sherwood Park, Alberta
- Arena: Glen Allan Recreation Complex & Sherwood Park Curling Club
- Dates: April 2–7
- Winner: Northern Ontario
- Curling club: Idylwylde Golf & CC, Sudbury
- Skip: Bella Croisier
- Third: Jamie Smith
- Second: Piper Croisier
- Lead: Lauren Rajala
- Coach: Shawn Croisier
- Finalist: Ontario (Deschenes)

The women's tournament of the 2019 Canadian U18 Curling Championships was held from April 2 to 7 at the Glen Allan Recreation Complex and the Sherwood Park Curling Club in Sherwood Park, Alberta, Canada.

== Teams ==
The teams are listed as follows:

Province	Skip	Third	Second	Lead	Alternate	Club(s)
Alberta	Jessica Wytrychowski	Olivia Jones	Micayla Kooistra	Emily Kiist		Airdrie Curling Club, Airdrie
Alberta (Host)	Julia Bakos	Quinn Prodaniuk	Kim Bonneau	Julianna MacKenzie	Madison Senft	Crestwood Curling Club, Crestwood
British Columbia	Kalia Buchy	Katelyn McGillivray	Hannah Lindner	Arissa Toffolo		Kimberly Curling Club, Kimberly
Manitoba	Emma Jensen	Jaycee Terrick	Kaitlyn Szewczyk	Gracey Gulak	Zoey Terrick	Dauphin Curling Club, Dauphin
New Brunswick	Melodie Forsythe	Carly Smith	Vanessa Roy	Caylee Smith		Curl Moncton, Moncton
Newfoundland and Labrador	Katie Follett	Sarah Chaytor	Felicity Snow	Rianna French		Re/Max Centre, St. John's
Northern Ontario	Bella Croisier	Jamie Smith	Piper Croisier	Lauren Rajala		Idylwylde Golf & Country Club, Sudbury
Northwest Territories	Cassie Rogers	Chasity Atigikyoak	Kali Skauge	Grace Twa		Yellowknife Curling Club, Yellowknife
Nova Scotia	Cally Moore	Taylour Stevens	Cassidy Currie	Cate Fitzgerald		Mayflower Curling Club, Halifax
Ontario	Emily Deschenes	Emma Artichuk	Jillian Uniacke	Celeste Gauthier	Grace Cave	Manotick Curling Club, Manotick
Prince Edward Island	Lauren Ferguson	Katie Shaw	Alexis Burris	Lexie Murray		Cornwall Curling Club, Cornwall
Quebec	Cynthia St-Georges	Florence Boivin	Élizabeth Cyr	Jeanne Gonthier	Stella-Rose Venne	Club de Curling Laval-sur-le-Lac, Laval
Saskatchewan	Emily Haupstein	Shayla Moore	Emma Wiens	Abbey Johnson		Weyburn Curling Club, Weyburn
Yukon	Katarina Anderson	Neizha Snider	Taylor Legge	Kiana Angelina Maningas		Whitehorse Curling Club, Whitehorse

== Round-robin standings ==
Final round-robin standings

Key
Teams to Knockout Round

Pool A	Skip	W	L
Northern Ontario	Bella Croisier	5	1
Saskatchewan	Emily Haupstein	4	2
Alberta (Host) (Note: Nunavut did not send a women's team to the tournament. Their spot was filled by an Alberta host team.)	Julia Bakos	4	2
Ontario	Emily Deschenes	3	3
Prince Edward Island	Lauren Ferguson	3	3
Nova Scotia	Cally Moore	2	4
Yukon	Katarina Anderson	0	6

Pool B	Skip	W	L
Alberta	Jessica Wytrychowski	5	1
Manitoba	Emma Jensen	4	2
New Brunswick	Melodie Forsythe	3	3
British Columbia	Kaila Buchy	3	3
Quebec	Cynthia St-Georges	3	3
Newfoundland and Labrador	Katie Follett	2	4
Northwest Territories	Cassie Rogers	1	5

== Round-robin results ==
All draw times are listed in Mountain Daylight Time (UTC−06:00).

=== Pool A ===
==== Draw 1 ====
Tuesday, April 2, 2:00 pm

Sheet D	1	2	3	4	5	6	7	8	Final
Ontario (Deschenes)	1	0	1	0	2	0	2	0	6
Nova Scotia (Moore)	0	3	0	2	0	1	0	2	8

Sheet G	1	2	3	4	5	6	7	8	Final
Prince Edward Island (Ferguson)	0	1	1	0	0	1	1	1	5
Saskatchewan (Haupstein)	0	0	0	2	1	0	0	0	3

==== Draw 2 ====
Tuesday, April 2, 6:00 pm

Sheet A	1	2	3	4	5	6	7	8	Final
Nova Scotia (Moore)	1	3	3	1	3	0	X	X	11
Yukon (Anderson)	0	0	0	0	0	2	X	X	2

Sheet I	1	2	3	4	5	6	7	8	Final
Northern Ontario (Croisier)	2	0	0	1	1	0	2	0	6
Alberta Host (Bakos)	0	2	1	0	0	3	0	2	8

==== Draw 3 ====
Wednesday, April 3, 10:00 am

Sheet C	1	2	3	4	5	6	7	8	Final
Saskatchewan (Haupstein)	1	2	0	1	0	2	0	0	6
Northern Ontario (Croisier)	0	0	1	0	4	0	3	1	9

Sheet D	1	2	3	4	5	6	7	8	Final
Yukon (Anderson)	0	0	0	0	0	1	0	0	1
Prince Edward Island (Ferguson)	3	1	2	1	4	0	4	2	17

Sheet G	1	2	3	4	5	6	7	8	Final
Alberta Host (Bakos)	0	2	1	0	2	0	1	0	6
Ontario (Deschenes)	1	0	0	2	0	2	0	2	7

==== Draw 4 ====
Wednesday, April 3, 2:00 pm

Sheet A	1	2	3	4	5	6	7	8	9	Final
Ontario (Deschenes)	1	0	1	0	1	0	0	0	0	3
Saskatchewan (Haupstein)	0	2	0	0	0	1	0	0	2	5

Sheet F	1	2	3	4	5	6	7	8	Final
Northern Ontario (Croisier)	0	0	1	1	1	2	0	X	5
Nova Scotia (Moore)	2	1	0	0	0	0	1	X	4

==== Draw 5 ====
Wednesday, April 3, 6:00 pm

Sheet E	1	2	3	4	5	6	7	8	Final
Alberta Host (Bakos)	7	0	3	2	4	3	X	X	19
Yukon (Anderson)	0	1	0	0	0	0	X	X	1

Sheet I	1	2	3	4	5	6	7	8	Final
Nova Scotia (Moore)	0	0	0	1	0	0	1	0	2
Prince Edward Island (Ferguson)	1	0	0	0	2	2	0	1	6

==== Draw 6 ====
Thursday, April 4, 2:00 pm

Sheet A	1	2	3	4	5	6	7	8	Final
Northern Ontario (Croisier)	2	0	0	1	2	1	0	X	6
Prince Edward Island (Ferguson)	0	0	2	0	0	0	1	X	3

Sheet H	1	2	3	4	5	6	7	8	Final
Yukon (Anderson)	0	0	0	0	0	1	X	X	1
Ontario (Deschenes)	5	3	5	3	2	0	X	X	18

==== Draw 7 ====
Thursday, April 4, 6:00 pm

Sheet C	1	2	3	4	5	6	7	8	Final
Nova Scotia (Moore)	1	0	0	0	2	0	0	X	3
Alberta Host (Bakos)	0	1	1	1	0	4	2	X	9

Sheet F	1	2	3	4	5	6	7	8	Final
Saskatchewan (Haupstein)	4	0	2	1	2	2	0	X	11
Yukon (Anderson)	0	2	0	0	0	0	1	X	3

==== Draw 8 ====
Friday, April 5, 10:00 am

Sheet B	1	2	3	4	5	6	7	8	9	Final
Ontario (Deschenes)	0	1	0	0	1	1	0	1	0	4
Northern Ontario (Croisier)	1	0	1	1	0	0	1	0	1	5

==== Draw 9 ====
Friday, April 5, 2:00 pm

Sheet E	1	2	3	4	5	6	7	8	Final
Saskatchewan (Haupstein)	2	0	2	0	1	2	0	X	7
Nova Scotia (Moore)	0	1	0	2	0	0	3	X	6

Sheet F	1	2	3	4	5	6	7	8	Final
Prince Edward Island (Ferguson)	2	0	1	0	0	0	X	X	3
Alberta Host (Bakos)	0	1	0	1	1	6	X	X	9

==== Draw 10 ====
Friday, April 5, 6:00 pm

Sheet B	1	2	3	4	5	6	7	8	Final
Alberta Host (Bakos)	0	0	0	1	0	0	X	X	1
Saskatchewan (Haupstein)	0	2	2	0	2	1	X	X	7

Sheet C	1	2	3	4	5	6	7	8	9	Final
Prince Edward Island (Ferguson)	3	0	1	0	1	0	1	0	0	6
Ontario {Deschenes)	0	1	0	2	0	1	0	2	2	8

Sheet G	1	2	3	4	5	6	7	8	Final
Yukon (Anderson)	0	1	0	0	0	1	X	X	2
Northern Ontario (Croisier)	7	0	4	2	2	0	X	X	15

=== Pool B ===
==== Draw 1 ====
Tuesday, April 2, 2:00 pm

Sheet A	1	2	3	4	5	6	7	8	9	Final
New Brunswick (Forsythe)	1	0	0	0	0	1	0	3	0	5
Northwest Territories (Rogers)	0	2	1	0	1	0	1	0	1	6

Sheet E	1	2	3	4	5	6	7	8	9	Final
Alberta (Wytrychowski)	0	1	0	1	1	0	0	3	1	7
Newfoundland and Labrador (Follett)	1	0	3	0	0	1	1	0	0	6

Sheet I	1	2	3	4	5	6	7	8	Final
Manitoba (Jensen)	0	0	2	0	0	2	0	2	6
British Columbia (Buchy)	0	0	0	2	1	0	2	0	5

==== Draw 2 ====
Tuesday, April 2, 6:00 pm

Sheet D	1	2	3	4	5	6	7	8	9	Final
Newfoundland and Labrador (Follett)	0	1	0	1	0	0	2	0	0	4
Quebec (St-Georges)	1	0	1	0	1	0	0	1	1	5

Sheet F	1	2	3	4	5	6	7	8	Final
Northwest Territories (Rogers)	1	0	0	0	0	0	0	X	1
Manitoba (Jensen)	0	3	1	0	2	1	0	X	7

==== Draw 3 ====
Wednesday, April 3, 10:00 am

Sheet B	1	2	3	4	5	6	7	8	Final
Quebec (St-Georges)	0	2	0	1	1	0	1	0	5
Alberta (Wytrychowski)	4	0	2	0	0	1	0	1	8

Sheet E	1	2	3	4	5	6	7	8	Final
British Columbia (Buchy)	0	0	3	0	1	0	1	0	5
New Brunswick (Forsythe)	4	1	0	1	0	1	0	1	8

==== Draw 4 ====
Wednesday, April 3, 2:00 pm

Sheet C	1	2	3	4	5	6	7	8	Final
Alberta (Wytrychowski)	0	0	0	1	0	0	2	X	3
Manitoba (Jensen)	0	1	1	0	0	4	0	X	6

Sheet H	1	2	3	4	5	6	7	8	Final
Newfoundland and Labrador (Follett)	0	1	0	2	0	0	0	X	3
British Columbia (Buchy)	1	0	1	0	2	0	1	X	5

Sheet I	1	2	3	4	5	6	7	8	Final
Quebec (St-Georges)	0	1	1	1	1	0	0	0	4
Northwest Territories (Rogers)	0	0	0	0	0	0	1	1	2

==== Draw 5 ====
Wednesday, April 3, 6:00 pm

Sheet A	1	2	3	4	5	6	7	8	Final
Northwest Territories (Rogers)	0	0	0	0	6	0	X	X	6
Newfoundland and Labrador (Follett)	2	4	2	3	0	4	X	X	15

Sheet D	1	2	3	4	5	6	7	8	Final
Manitoba (Jensen)	0	2	0	0	0	1	0	X	3
New Brunswick (Forsythe)	1	0	0	2	2	0	1	X	6

==== Draw 6 ====
Thursday, April 4, 2:00 pm

Sheet C	1	2	3	4	5	6	7	8	Final
British Columbia (Buchy)	1	0	1	1	0	1	1	X	5
Quebec (St-Georges)	0	1	0	0	1	0	0	X	2

Sheet G	1	2	3	4	5	6	7	8	Final
New Brunswick (Forsythe)	0	0	1	0	0	1	0	X	2
Alberta (Wytrychowski)	0	3	0	0	1	0	1	X	5

==== Draw 7 ====
Thursday, April 4, 6:00 pm

Sheet B	1	2	3	4	5	6	7	8	Final
Manitoba (Jensen)	0	1	0	1	0	2	0	3	7
Newfoundland and Labrador (Follett)	2	0	2	0	1	0	1	0	6

Sheet H	1	2	3	4	5	6	7	8	Final
Alberta (Wytrychowski)	2	2	0	1	2	1	0	X	8
Northwest Territories (Rogers)	0	0	1	0	0	0	1	X	2

==== Draw 9 ====
Friday, April 5, 2:00 pm

Sheet D	1	2	3	4	5	6	7	8	Final
Northwest Territories (Rogers)	0	4	0	1	0	1	0	0	6
British Columbia (Buchy)	1	0	2	0	3	0	0	2	8

Sheet G	1	2	3	4	5	6	7	8	Final
Quebec (St-Georges)	0	0	0	2	1	0	0	3	6
Manitoba (Jensen)	0	1	1	0	0	0	1	0	3

Sheet I	1	2	3	4	5	6	7	8	Final
Newfoundland and Labrador (Follett)	0	0	3	1	1	0	5	X	10
New Brunswick (Forsythe)	0	0	0	0	0	3	0	X	3

==== Draw 10 ====
Friday, April 5, 6:00 pm

Sheet A	1	2	3	4	5	6	7	8	Final
New Brunswick (Forsythe)	0	1	0	0	1	1	1	1	5
Quebec (St-Georges)	1	0	1	2	0	0	0	0	4

Sheet F	1	2	3	4	5	6	7	8	Final
British Columbia (Buchy)	1	0	0	3	0	0	0	X	4
Alberta (Wytrychowski)	0	1	3	0	4	1	1	X	10

== Knockout round ==
=== A Bracket ===
Qualifier 1
A1	Northern Ontario	7
B4	British Columbia	4
A1	Northern Ontario	7
B3	New Brunswick	4
A2	Saskatchewan	5
B3	New Brunswick	7

Qualifier 2
B2	Manitoba	4
A3	Alberta (Host)	7
A3	Alberta (Host)	5
A4	Ontario	6
B1	Alberta	4
A4	Ontario	6

==== A Semifinals ====
Saturday, April 6, 8:30 am

Sheet F	1	2	3	4	5	6	7	8	Final
Northern Ontario (Croisier)	0	1	2	0	0	3	0	1	7
British Columbia (Buchy)	0	0	0	1	1	0	2	0	4

Sheet G	1	2	3	4	5	6	7	8	Final
Saskatchewan (Haupstein)	2	0	1	1	0	0	1	0	5
New Brunswick (Forsythe)	0	3	0	0	2	1	0	1	7

Sheet H	1	2	3	4	5	6	7	8	Final
Manitoba (Jensen)	1	0	0	2	0	1	0	0	4
Alberta Host (Bakos)	0	1	1	0	1	0	2	2	7

Sheet I	1	2	3	4	5	6	7	8	Final
Alberta (Wytrychowski)	1	0	0	0	2	0	1	0	4
Ontario (Deschenes)	0	0	2	1	0	2	0	1	6

==== A Finals ====
Saturday, April 6, 2:00 pm

Sheet A	1	2	3	4	5	6	7	8	Final
Northern Ontario (Croisier)	1	0	2	0	3	1	0	X	7
New Brunswick (Forsythe)	0	1	0	2	0	0	1	X	4

Sheet B	1	2	3	4	5	6	7	8	9	Final
Alberta Host (Bakos)	0	2	0	2	0	0	0	1	0	5
Ontario (Deschenes)	1	0	1	0	0	2	1	0	1	6

=== B Bracket ===
Semifinals			Qualifier 3
			A3	Alberta (Host)	4
B4	British Columbia	7	B4	British Columbia	5
A2	Saskatchewan	6

Semifinals			Qualifier 4
			B3	New Brunswick	8
B2	Manitoba	5	B2	Manitoba	6
B1	Alberta	4

==== B Semifinals ====
Saturday, April 6, 2:00 pm

Sheet C	1	2	3	4	5	6	7	8	Final
British Columbia (Buchy)	3	0	1	0	1	0	0	2	7
Saskatchewan (Haupstein)	0	3	0	1	0	1	1	0	6

Sheet D	1	2	3	4	5	6	7	8	Final
Manitoba (Jensen)	0	0	0	0	3	1	0	1	5
Alberta (Wytrychowski)	1	1	0	1	0	0	1	0	4

==== B Finals ====
Saturday, April 6, 7:30 pm

Sheet B	1	2	3	4	5	6	7	8	Final
New Brunswick (Forsythe)	2	0	1	0	2	2	0	1	8
Manitoba (Jensen)	0	0	0	4	0	0	2	0	6

Sheet E	1	2	3	4	5	6	7	8	Final
Alberta Host (Bakos)	2	0	1	0	0	0	1	0	4
British Columbia (Buchy)	0	1	0	1	1	1	0	1	5

== Playoffs ==
Semifinals
B3	New Brunswick	4
A1	Northern Ontario	7
B4	British Columbia	2
A4	Ontario	6

Final
A1	Northern Ontario	6
A4	Ontario	2

Bronze medal game
B3	New Brunswick	1
B4	British Columbia	8

=== Semifinals ===
Sunday, April 7, 9:00 am

Sheet C	1	2	3	4	5	6	7	8	Final
New Brunswick (Forsythe)	0	2	0	0	0	2	0	0	4
Northern Ontario (Croisier)	1	0	0	2	0	0	2	2	7

Sheet D	1	2	3	4	5	6	7	8	Final
British Columbia (Buchy)	0	0	1	0	1	0	0	0	2
Ontario (Deschenes)	1	1	0	1	0	0	1	2	6

=== Bronze medal game ===
Sunday, April 7, 1:00 pm

Sheet D	1	2	3	4	5	6	7	8	Final
New Brunswick (Forsythe)	0	1	0	0	0	0	X	X	1
British Columbia (Buchy)	2	0	2	0	3	1	X	X	8

=== Final ===
Sunday, April 7, 1:00 pm

Sheet C	1	2	3	4	5	6	7	8	Final
Northern Ontario (Croisier)	0	1	0	1	2	2	0	X	6
Ontario (Deschenes)	0	0	1	0	0	0	1	X	2
