= New Brunswick Curling Association =

- Sport: Curling
- Jurisdiction: Provincial
- Membership: 27 curling clubs
- Founded: 1989
- Affiliation: Curling Canada

Official website
- www.nbcurling.com
- (Canada)

The New Brunswick Curling Association (NBCA) is the provincial governing body for the sport of curling in the Canadian province of New Brunswick. The NBCA was formed from the amalgamation of separate men's and women's associations in 1989.

Marg Maranda is the executive director for the New Brunswick Curling Association.

== Events ==
=== Provincial ===
The New Brunswick Curling Association hosts the following events on a yearly basis:

- NB Tankard - men's provincial championship, for qualification to the men's nationals
- New Brunswick Scotties Tournament of Hearts - women's provincial championship, for qualification to the women's nationals
- Mixed Doubles
- Seniors (Men's & Women's)
- Club Championship (Men's & Women's)
- Mixed
- Masters (Men's & Women's)
- U 21 Final 8 (Men's & Women's)
- Moncton Little rocks Jamboree
- U-18 Championship (Boys & Girls)
- U-15 Kenny Coates (Boys & Girls)
- Junior Mixed
- Provincial Little rocks Jamboree
- Atlantic University Sport

=== National/International ===
The New Brunswick Curling Association has hosted the following major events:

- Canadian Men's Curling Championship
  - 1947 Saint John
  - 1956 Moncton
  - 1975 Fredericton
  - 1985 Moncton
- Canadian Women's Curling Championship
  - 1963 Saint John
  - 1975 Moncton
  - 1988 Fredericton
- World Men's Curling Championship
  - 2009 Moncton

== See also ==
- List of curling clubs in New Brunswick
