= List of curling clubs in New Brunswick =

This is a list of curling clubs in the Canadian province of New Brunswick. Curling in New Brunswick is organized by the New Brunswick Curling Association. The NBCA divides the province into six regions:

== Northeast ==
- Bathurst Curling Club - Bathurst
- Beresford Curling Club - Beresford
- Campbellton Curling Club - Campbellton
- Club de curling de Tracadie/Sheila - Sheila
- Miramichi Curling Club - Miramichi

== Southeast ==
- Curl Moncton - Moncton
- Fundy Curling Club - Riverside-Albert
- Kent Curling - Rexton
- Sackville Curling Club - Sackville

== Southwest ==
- Harvey Curling Club - Harvey Station
- Heather Curling Club - St. Andrews
- St. George Curling Club - St. George
- St. Stephen Curling Club - St. Stephen

== Central ==
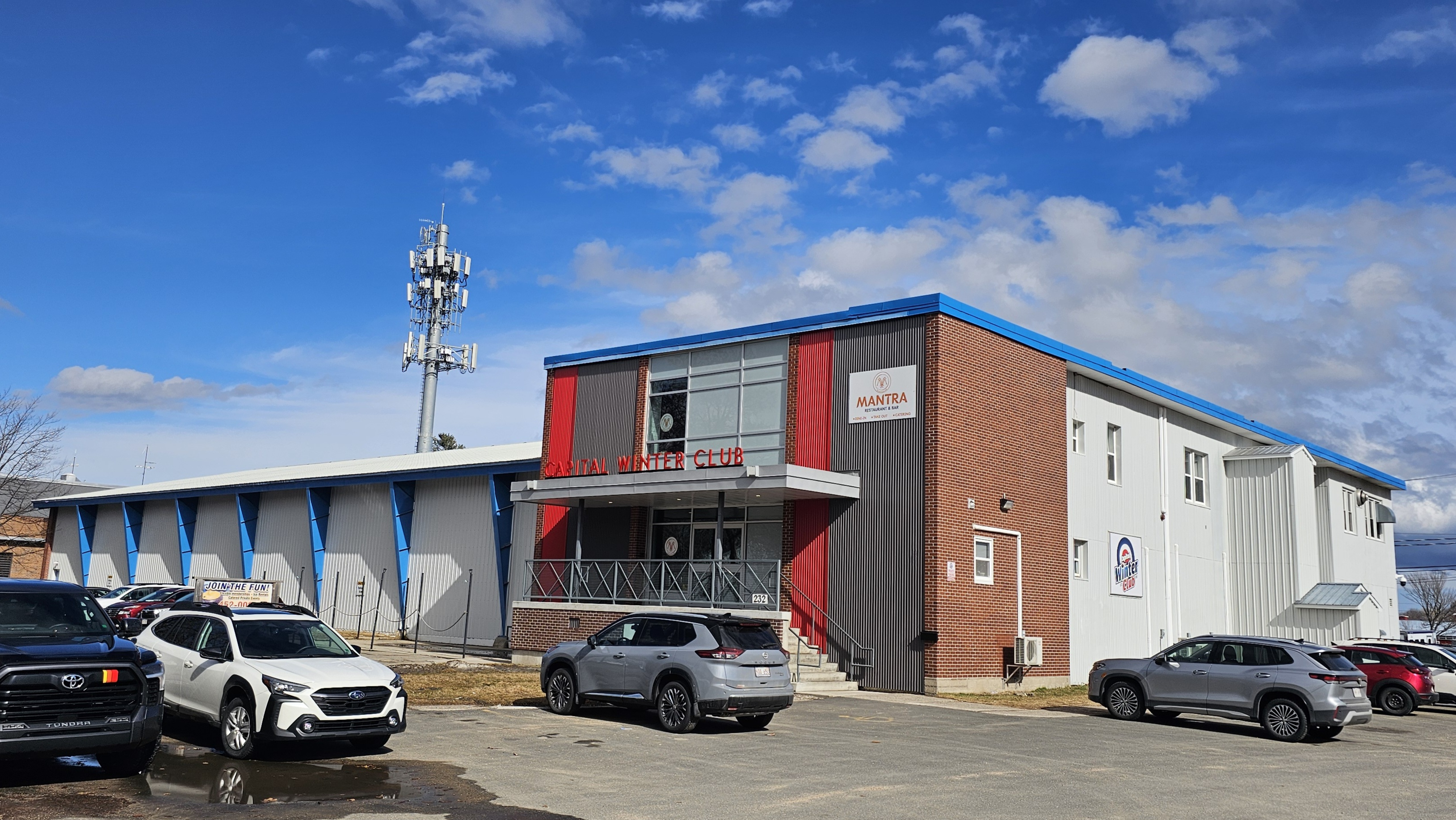
The Capital Winter Club in 2026

- Capital Winter Club - Fredericton
- Doaktown Curling Club - Doaktown
- Gage Golf & Curling Club - Oromocto
- Gladstone Curling Club - Fredericton Junction
- Nashwaak Curling Club - Stanley

== South ==
- Carleton Curling Club - Saint John
- Hampton Curling Club - Hampton
- Sussex Golf & Curling Club - Sussex
- Thistle St. Andrews Curling Club - Saint John

== Northwest ==
- Florenceville Curling Club - Florenceville
- Grand Falls Sporting Club Inc. - Grand Falls
- Nackawic Curling Club - Nackawic
- Woodstock Golf & Curling Club - Woodstock
