= 2017 Canadian U18 Curling Championships – Men's tournament =

2017 Canadian U18 Curling Championships Men's tournament
- Host city: Moncton, New Brunswick
- Arena: Superior Propane Centre & Curl Moncton
- Dates: April 18–22, 2017
- Winner: Northern Ontario
- Curling club: Sudbury Curling Club, Sudbury
- Skip: Jacob Horgan
- Third: Max Cull
- Second: Nicholas Bissonnette
- Lead: Shane Robinson
- Coach: Gerry Horgan
- Finalist: Nova Scotia (Ryan Abraham)

The men's tournament of the 2017 Canadian U18 Curling Championships was held from April 18 to 22, 2017 at the Superior Propane Centre and Curl Moncton in Moncton, New Brunswick.

== Teams ==
The teams are listed as follows:

Province	Skip	Third	Second	Lead	Club(s)
Alberta	Jacob Libbus (Fourth)	Riley Helston (Skip)	Pacen Anderson	Tyler McWillie	Oilfields Curling Club, Black Diamond
British Columbia	Tyler Tardi	Sterling Middleton	Scott Gray	Derek Chandler	Langley Curling Centre, Langley & Victoria Curling Club, Victoria
Manitoba	Brett Walter	Jordan Peters	Zachary Wasylik	Liam Tod	Morris Curling Club, Morris
New Brunswick	Liam Marin	Adam Tracy	Donovan Lanteigne	Matt Magee	Thistle-St. Andrew's Curling Club, Saint John
Newfoundland and Labrador	Andrew Lawrence	Coleton Vriesendorp	James Trickett	Alex Phillips	Re/Max Centre, St. John's
Northern Ontario	Jacob Horgan	Max Cull	Nicholas Bissonnette	Shane Robinson	Sudbury Curling Club, Sudbury
Northwest Territories	Oberon Lee	Adam Naugler	Logan Waddell	Kyle Rogers	Yellowknife Curling Club, Yellowknife
Nova Scotia	Ryan Abraham	Mitchell Cortello	Jake Flemming	Thomas Mosher	Mayflower Curling Club, Halifax
Ontario	Hazen Enman	Daniel Vanveghel	Scott Mitchell	Ryan Mitchell	Whitby Curling Club, Whitby
Prince Edward Island	Donald DeWolfe	Jacob Wilkins	Alex Gallant	Nick Johnston	Silver Fox Curling & Yacht Club, Summerside
Quebec	Greg Cheal	Simon-Olivier Hébert	Zachary Griffiths	James Trahan	Club de Curling Lennoxville, Sherbrooke
Saskatchewan	Rylan Kleiter	Trevor Johnson	Joshua Mattern	Matthieu Taillon	Sutherland Curling Club, Saskatoon

== Round Robin Standings ==
Final Round Robin Standings

Key
Teams to Championship Pool

Pool A	Skip	W	L
Saskatchewan	Rylan Kleiter	4	1
Nova Scotia	Ryan Abraham	3	2
Northern Ontario	Jacob Horgan	3	2
Newfoundland and Labrador	Andrew Lawrence	2	3
Manitoba	Brett Walter	2	3
Prince Edward Island	Donald DeWolfe	1	4

Pool B	Skip	W	L
British Columbia	Tyler Tardi	5	0
Ontario	Hazen Enman	3	2
Quebec	Greg Cheal	3	2
New Brunswick	Liam Marin	3	2
Alberta	Riley Helston	1	4
Northwest Territories	Oberon Lee	0	5

== Round Robin Results ==
All draw times are listed in Atlantic Time (UTC−04:00).

=== Pool A ===
==== Draw 1 ====
Wednesday, April 18, 11:00 am

Sheet A	1	2	3	4	5	6	7	8	Final
Prince Edward Island (DeWolfe)	0	0	0	0	1	0	0	X	1
Manitoba (Walter)	0	2	2	2	0	1	3	X	10

Sheet C	1	2	3	4	5	6	7	8	Final
Newfoundland and Labrador (Lawrence)	0	0	0	1	0	1	X	X	2
Saskatchewan (Kleiter)	2	1	3	0	3	0	X	X	9

Sheet E	1	2	3	4	5	6	7	8	Final
Northern Ontario (Horgan)	0	0	0	0	0	0	X	X	0
Nova Scotia (Abraham)	0	3	0	0	1	3	X	X	7

==== Draw 2 ====
Wednesday, April 18, 3:00 pm

Sheet I	1	2	3	4	5	6	7	8	Final
Newfoundland and Labrador (Lawrence)	1	0	2	0	1	1	0	X	5
Manitoba (Walter)	0	2	0	0	0	0	1	X	3

==== Draw 3 ====
Wednesday, April 18, 7:00 pm

Sheet A	1	2	3	4	5	6	7	8	Final
Northern Ontario (Horgan)	0	0	0	0	2	3	0	X	5
Saskatchewan (Kleiter)	0	0	0	3	0	0	0	X	3

Sheet F	1	2	3	4	5	6	7	8	Final
Nova Scotia (Abraham)	2	2	0	0	5	3	X	X	12
Prince Edward Island (DeWolfe)	0	0	1	0	0	0	X	X	1

==== Draw 4 ====
Thursday, April 19, 10:00 am

Sheet B	1	2	3	4	5	6	7	8	9	Final
Saskatchewan (Kleiter)	0	0	0	2	1	0	0	0	1	4
Prince Edward Island (DeWolfe)	0	0	0	0	0	2	1	0	0	3

Sheet C	1	2	3	4	5	6	7	8	Final
Manitoba (Walter)	0	0	0	0	2	0	0	X	2
Nova Scotia (Abraham)	1	0	0	2	0	1	2	X	6

==== Draw 5 ====
Thursday, April 19, 2:00 pm

Sheet C	1	2	3	4	5	6	7	8	Final
Northern Ontario (Horgan)	0	2	0	2	0	2	1	X	7
Newfoundland and Labrador (Lawrence)	0	0	1	0	0	0	0	X	1

==== Draw 6 ====
Thursday, April 19, 6:00 pm

Sheet B	1	2	3	4	5	6	7	8	Final
Nova Scotia (Abraham)	2	0	0	0	0	2	1	X	5
Newfoundland and Labrador (Lawrence)	0	1	3	2	2	0	0	X	8

Sheet C	1	2	3	4	5	6	7	8	Final
Northern Ontario (Horgan)	0	0	2	1	0	0	3	X	6
Prince Edward Island (DeWolfe)	0	1	0	0	0	0	0	X	1

Sheet H	1	2	3	4	5	6	7	8	Final
Manitoba (Walter)	0	0	1	0	2	0	1	X	4
Saskatchewan (Kleiter)	1	1	0	1	0	4	0	X	7

==== Draw 8 ====
Friday, April 20, 2:00 pm

Sheet B	1	2	3	4	5	6	7	8	Final
Manitoba (Walter)	0	1	1	0	0	0	3	4	9
Northern Ontario (Horgan)	0	0	0	1	2	0	0	0	3

Sheet E	1	2	3	4	5	6	7	8	Final
Prince Edward Island (DeWolfe)	1	0	1	0	1	2	0	1	6
Newfoundland and Labrador (Lawrence)	0	1	0	1	0	0	1	0	3

Sheet G	1	2	3	4	5	6	7	8	Final
Saskatchewan (Kleiter)	1	0	0	3	2	0	1	X	7
Nova Scotia (Abraham)	0	1	0	0	0	1	0	X	2

=== Pool B ===
==== Draw 1 ====
Wednesday, April 18, 11:00 am

Sheet H	1	2	3	4	5	6	7	8	Final
Northwest Territories (Lee)	0	0	0	0	1	0	0	X	1
British Columbia (Tardi)	4	2	3	2	0	0	1	X	12

Sheet I	1	2	3	4	5	6	7	8	Final
Quebec (Cheal)	0	2	0	0	1	0	1	0	4
Ontario (Enman)	2	0	1	0	0	1	0	1	5

==== Draw 2 ====
Wednesday, April 18, 3:00 pm

Sheet B	1	2	3	4	5	6	7	8	9	Final
New Brunswick (Marin)	0	0	2	1	0	0	2	1	0	6
Quebec (Cheal)	1	3	0	0	1	1	0	0	1	7

Sheet C	1	2	3	4	5	6	7	8	Final
Ontario (Enman)	0	1	1	0	1	0	2	2	7
Alberta (Helston)	1	0	0	2	0	3	0	0	6

==== Draw 3 ====
Wednesday, April 18, 7:00 pm

Sheet D	1	2	3	4	5	6	7	8	Final
Northwest Territories (Lee)	0	0	0	1	0	0	0	X	1
Alberta (Helston)	3	4	1	0	1	0	0	X	9

Sheet E	1	2	3	4	5	6	7	8	Final
New Brunswick (Marin)	0	2	0	2	0	1	0	X	5
British Columbia (Tardi)	1	0	1	0	2	0	3	X	7

==== Draw 4 ====
Thursday, April 19, 10:00 am

Sheet H	1	2	3	4	5	6	7	8	Final
Northwest Territories (Lee)	1	0	0	0	0	0	1	X	2
Quebec (Cheal)	0	0	3	0	3	2	0	X	8

==== Draw 5 ====
Thursday, April 19, 2:00 pm

Sheet B	1	2	3	4	5	6	7	8	9	Final
British Columbia (Tardi)	2	0	1	0	2	0	0	0	1	6
Ontario (Enman)	0	3	0	1	0	0	0	1	0	5

Sheet F	1	2	3	4	5	6	7	8	Final
New Brunswick (Marin)	4	0	2	3	0	0	2	X	11
Northwest Territories (Lee)	0	1	0	0	2	1	0	X	4

Sheet H	1	2	3	4	5	6	7	8	Final
Alberta (Helston)	0	0	0	2	0	0	2	0	4
Quebec (Cheal)	1	1	0	0	1	0	0	2	5

==== Draw 6 ====
Thursday, April 19, 6:00 pm

Sheet A	1	2	3	4	5	6	7	8	Final
New Brunswick (Marin)	0	1	0	1	0	0	0	2	4
Ontario (Enman)	1	0	1	0	0	1	0	0	3

Sheet I	1	2	3	4	5	6	7	8	9	Final
Alberta (Helston)	0	0	0	3	0	2	0	2	0	7
British Columbia (Tardi)	3	0	0	0	3	0	1	0	1	8

==== Draw 7 ====
Friday, April 20, 10:00 am

Sheet E	1	2	3	4	5	6	7	8	Final
Ontario (Enman)	2	3	2	0	1	0	1	X	9
Northwest Territories (Lee)	0	0	0	0	0	0	0	X	0

==== Draw 8 ====
Friday, April 20, 2:00 pm

Sheet A	1	2	3	4	5	6	7	8	9	Final
Alberta (Helston)	1	1	0	0	1	0	0	1	0	4
New Brunswick (Marin)	0	0	2	1	0	1	0	0	2	6

Sheet D	1	2	3	4	5	6	7	8	Final
British Columbia (Tardi)	2	0	2	0	0	0	2	1	7
Quebec (Cheal)	0	2	0	1	0	1	0	0	4

== Placement Round ==
=== Seeding Pool ===
==== Seeding Pool Standings ====
Final Seeding Pool Standings

Team	Skip	W	L
New Brunswick	Liam Marin	5	3
Alberta	Riley Helston	4	4
Newfoundland and Labrador	Andrew Lawrence	3	5
Manitoba	Brett Walter	3	5
Prince Edward Island	Donald DeWolfe	3	5
Northwest Territories	Oberon Lee	0	8

==== Seeding Pool Results ====
===== Draw 9 =====
Friday, April 20, 7:00 pm

Sheet G	1	2	3	4	5	6	7	8	Final
Northwest Territories (Lee)	2	0	0	0	0	0	0	X	2
Newfoundland and Labrador (Lawrence)	0	1	1	2	2	1	2	X	9

Sheet H	1	2	3	4	5	6	7	8	Final
New Brunswick (Marin)	0	2	0	0	1	1	0	4	8
Manitoba (Walter)	0	0	3	0	0	0	1	0	4

Sheet I	1	2	3	4	5	6	7	8	Final
Alberta (Helston)	0	1	1	1	0	0	2	X	5
Prince Edward Island (DeWolfe)	0	0	0	0	1	0	0	X	1

===== Draw 11 =====
Saturday, April 21, 2:00 pm

Sheet D	1	2	3	4	5	6	7	8	Final
Newfoundland and Labrador (Lawrence)	1	0	0	2	0	1	0	0	4
Alberta (Helston)	0	0	2	0	1	0	0	2	5

Sheet E	1	2	3	4	5	6	7	8	Final
Manitoba (Walter)	0	4	0	5	0	2	0	X	11
Northwest Territories (Lee)	0	0	1	0	1	0	1	X	3

Sheet F	1	2	3	4	5	6	7	8	Final
Prince Edward Island (DeWolfe)	1	1	0	1	0	1	2	X	6
New Brunswick (Marin)	0	0	2	0	1	0	0	X	3

===== Draw 12 =====
Saturday, April 21, 6:00 pm

Sheet G	1	2	3	4	5	6	7	8	Final
Manitoba (Walter)	0	0	0	0	1	0	0	0	1
Alberta (Helston)	0	0	0	0	0	2	0	1	3

Sheet H	1	2	3	4	5	6	7	8	Final
Prince Edward Island (DeWolfe)	2	0	4	0	3	1	1	X	11
Northwest Territories (Lee)	0	1	0	1	0	0	0	X	2

Sheet I	1	2	3	4	5	6	7	8	Final
Newfoundland and Labrador (Lawrence)	0	0	1	0	1	0	2	1	5
New Brunswick (Marin)	2	3	0	1	0	0	0	0	6

=== Championship Pool ===
==== Championship Pool Standings ====
Final Championship Pool Standings

Key
Teams to Playoffs

Province	Skip	W	L
British Columbia	Tyler Tardi	7	1
Saskatchewan	Rylan Kleiter	6	2
Nova Scotia	Ryan Abraham	5	3
Northern Ontario	Jacob Horgan	5	3
Ontario	Hazen Enman	4	4
Quebec	Gregory Cheal	3	5

==== Championship Pool Results ====
===== Draw 9 =====
Friday, April 20, 7:00 pm

Sheet A	1	2	3	4	5	6	7	8	Final
Quebec (Cheal)	1	0	0	0	1	0	X	X	2
Saskatchewan (Kleiter)	0	1	3	1	0	3	X	X	8

Sheet B	1	2	3	4	5	6	7	8	Final
Ontario (Enman)	2	0	0	1	1	1	0	X	5
Northern Ontario (Horgan)	0	2	0	0	0	0	1	X	3

Sheet C	1	2	3	4	5	6	7	8	Final
British Columbia (Tardi)	1	0	4	1	1	0	2	X	9
Nova Scotia (Abraham)	0	2	0	0	0	2	0	X	4

===== Draw 10 =====
Saturday, April 21, 10:00 am

Sheet A	1	2	3	4	5	6	7	8	Final
Northern Ontario (Horgan)	0	2	1	0	3	1	0	X	7
British Columbia (Tardi)	2	0	0	2	0	0	1	X	5

Sheet B	1	2	3	4	5	6	7	8	Final
Nova Scotia (Abraham)	0	0	3	0	2	2	1	X	8
Quebec (Cheal)	0	2	0	1	0	0	0	X	3

Sheet F	1	2	3	4	5	6	7	8	Final
Saskatchewan (Kleiter)	0	1	0	0	0	2	3	X	6
Ontario (Enman)	0	0	1	0	0	0	0	X	1

===== Draw 12 =====
Saturday, April 21, 6:00 pm

Sheet A	1	2	3	4	5	6	7	8	Final
Nova Scotia (Abraham)	0	0	1	0	0	2	0	3	6
Ontario (Enman)	0	0	0	0	2	0	1	0	3

Sheet B	1	2	3	4	5	6	7	8	Final
Saskatchewan (Kleiter)	0	0	0	1	1	0	0	X	2
British Columbia (Tardi)	0	2	4	0	0	1	1	X	8

Sheet E	1	2	3	4	5	6	7	8	Final
Northern Ontario (Horgan)	1	0	0	1	2	0	6	X	10
Quebec (Cheal)	0	1	1	0	0	1	0	X	3

== Playoffs ==
Semifinals
1	British Columbia	1
4	Northern Ontario	5
2	Saskatchewan	3
3	Nova Scotia	5

Final
4	Northern Ontario	4
3	Nova Scotia	1

Bronze medal game
1	British Columbia	6
2	Saskatchewan	4

=== Semifinals ===
Sunday, April 22, 1:00 pm

Sheet C	1	2	3	4	5	6	7	8	Final
Saskatchewan (Kleiter)	0	0	1	0	2	0	0	0	3
Nova Scotia (Abraham)	0	1	0	3	0	0	0	1	5

Player percentages
Saskatchewan		Nova Scotia	
Matthieu Taillon	69%	Thomas Mosher	78%
Joshua Mattern	73%	Jake Flemming	75%
Trevor Johnson	83%	Mitchell Cortello	80%
Rylan Kleiter	68%	Ryan Abraham	83%
Total	73%	Total	79%

Sheet D	1	2	3	4	5	6	7	8	Final
British Columbia (Tardi)	0	0	0	0	0	1	0	X	1
Northern Ontario (Horgan)	1	0	1	1	0	0	2	X	5

Player percentages
British Columbia		Northern Ontario	
Scott Gray	86%	Shane Robinson	84%
Derek Chandler	91%	Nicholas Bissonnette	96%
Sterling Middleton	77%	Max Cull	88%
Tyler Tardi	77%	Jacob Horgan	96%
Total	83%	Total	91%

=== Bronze medal game ===
Sunday, April 22, 5:15 pm

Sheet A	1	2	3	4	5	6	7	8	Final
British Columbia (Tardi)	0	0	0	2	0	2	0	2	6
Saskatchewan (Kleiter)	0	1	1	0	2	0	0	0	4

Player percentages
British Columbia		Saskatchewan	
Scott Gray	77%	Matthieu Taillon	83%
Derek Chandler	70%	Joshua Mattern	81%
Sterling Middleton	55%	Trevor Johnson	84%
Tyler Tardi	86%	Rylan Kleiter	64%
Total	72%	Total	78%

=== Final ===
Sunday, April 22, 5:15 pm

Sheet B	1	2	3	4	5	6	7	8	Final
Northern Ontario (Horgan)	0	0	2	1	0	0	1	X	4
Nova Scotia (Abraham)	0	1	0	0	0	0	0	X	1

Player percentages
Northern Ontario		Nova Scotia	
Shane Robinson	90%	Thomas Mosher	94%
Nicholas Bissonnette	63%	Jake Flemming	59%
Max Cull	72%	Mitchell Cortello	84%
Jacob Horgan	98%	Ryan Abraham	73%
Total	81%	Total	78%

== Top 5 Player Percentages ==
Leads	%
(Manitoba) Liam Tod	86
(Nova Scotia) Thomas Mosher	83
(New Brunswick) Matt Magee	83
(British Columbia) Scott Gray	83
(Northern Ontario) Shane Robinson	81

Seconds	%
(Newfoundland and Labrador) James Trickett	79
(Northern Ontario) Nick Bissonette	78
(Saskatchewan) Joshua Mattern	77
(Manitoba) Zach Wasylik	77
(Prince Edward Island) Alex Gallant	77

Thirds	%
(Saskatchewan) Trevor Johnson	85
(Ontario) Daniel Van Veghal	79
(British Columbia) Sterling Middleton	77
(Manitoba) Jordan Peters	77
(Alberta) Riley Helston	76

Skips	%
(Northern Ontario) Jacob Horgan	80
(New Brunswick) Liam Marin	76
(Alberta) Jacob Libbus	76
(British Columbia) Tyler Tardi	76
(Saskatchewan) Rylan Kleiter	76

Team	%
Saskatchewan	79
Manitoba	79
Northern Ontario	78
British Columbia	78
New Brunswick	76
