= 2025 Canadian U18 Curling Championships =

- Host city: Saskatoon, Saskatchewan
- Arena: Nutana Curling Club
- Dates: February 17–22
- Men's winner: Nova Scotia 1
- Curling club: Halifax CC, Halifax & Chester CC, Chester
- Skip: Zach Atherton
- Third: Alan Fawcett
- Second: Tyler McMullen
- Lead: Jed Freeman
- Coach: Joel Krats
- Finalist: Ontario (MacTavish)
- Women's winner: Nova Scotia 1
- Curling club: Halifax CC, Halifax
- Skip: Cassidy Blades
- Third: Stephanie Atherton
- Second: Anna MacNutt
- Lead: Lily Mitchell
- Coach: Kevin Ouellette
- Finalist: Alberta 2 (Desormeau)

The 2025 Canadian U18 Curling Championships were held from February 17 to 22 at the Nutana Curling Club in Saskatoon, Saskatchewan.

This was the seventh edition of the Canadian U18 Curling Championships. The 2025 edition also continued to use the twenty-one-team format, splitting the teams into three pools of seven. The top four teams from each pool at the end of the round robin advanced to the playoff round. Based on results from the 2023 and 2024 events, certain provinces earned two berths to the championship. On the boy's side, seven provinces earned a second birth; Alberta, Manitoba, New Brunswick, Newfoundland and Labrador, Nova Scotia, Quebec and Saskatchewan earned a second spot. There were eight provinces who received a second berth in the girl's event as Yukon did not send a team. Therefore, Alberta, British Columbia, Newfoundland and Labrador, Manitoba, Nova Scotia, Ontario, Quebec, and Saskatchewan got a second team.

Due to the winter storms in the Greater Toronto Area before the event, 60 players and coaches from different provinces were delayed in arriving at Saskatoon for the event. Because of this, the event start date was delayed by one day and started on Monday, Feb. 17. Teams will play a full round-robin schedule and a modified playoff schedule to maintain the end date of Saturday, Feb. 22. When the event started on February 17, five teams (all from Atlantic Canada) had still not made it to Saskatoon. The draw was then altered again so that the competition would begin with the teams that had already arrived, and was continuously updated throughout the event to ensure all teams experienced a full national championship, and not forfeit any games.

== Medallists ==
Under-18	Gold	Silver	Bronze
Men	Nova Scotia 1 Zach Atherton; Alan Fawcett; Tyler McMullen; Jed Freeman	Ontario; Tyler MacTavish; Liam Rowe; Alec Symeonides; Connor Elkins; Nathan Thomas	Quebec 2 Zachary Janidlo; Owen Paterson; Nicolas Janidlo; Coby Olszewski; Cole Richard
Women	Nova Scotia 1 Cassidy Blades; Stephanie Atherton; Anna MacNutt; Lily Mitchell	Alberta 2 Abby Desormeau; Julia Kennedy; Molly Whitbread; Savannah Dutka; Camryn Adams	Ontario 1 Katrina Frlan; Erika Wainwright; Samantha Wall; Lauren Norman

== Men ==
=== Teams ===
The teams are listed as follows:

Province / Territory	Skip	Third	Second	Lead	Alternate	Club(s)
Alberta 1	Peter Hlushak	Jaxon Hiebert	Varyk Doepker	Parker Harris	Nate Burton	Crestwood CC, Edmonton; Sherwood Park CC, Sherwood Park
Alberta 2	Austin Hennig	Preston Russell	Matthew Reiniger	Hugo Chow	Timothy Lawrence	Saville Community SC, Edmonton
British Columbia	Owen Jaeger	Spencer Rempel	Noah Wielgosz	Brenden Hruschak		Kelowna CC, Kelowna
Manitoba 1	Nash Sugden	Tyler Fehr	Tanner Treichel	Ryan Thiessen	Quinn Lagace	Morden CC, Morden
Manitoba 2	Logan Zacharias	Rylan Graham	Carter Malmquist	Hudson Strand		Heather CC, Winnipeg
New Brunswick 1	Sahil Dalrymple	Michael Hughes	Jayden Colwell	Ron-Allen Elsinga		Gage Golf & CC, Oromocto
New Brunswick 2	Evan Hanson	Dakari Rousselle	Graydon Andrew	Jack Hoyt		Capital WC, Fredericton
Newfoundland and Labrador 1	Ephram Noel	Alex Manuel	Matthew Coish	Tyler Murphy		RE/MAX Centre, St. John's
Newfoundland and Labrador 2	Zachery French	Lucas Cole	Lucas Wall	Noah Warren-Pitre		RE/MAX Centre, St. John's
Northern Ontario	Justin MacKay	Kamdyn Julien	Carter McClelland	Jake Clouthier		YNCU CC, Sault Ste. Marie
Northwest Territories	Jasper Willkomm	Jacob Robertson	Atticus Willkomm	Jett Etter		Inuvik CC, Inuvik
Nova Scotia 1	Zach Atherton	Alan Fawcett	Tyler McMullen	Jed Freeman		Halifax CC, Halifax; Chester CC, Chester
Nova Scotia 2	Elex Lockhart	Marcus Hannam	Bruno Whynot	Sam Crouse	Mark Strang	Berwick CC, Berwick
Nunavut	Ciaran Robinson	David Hoyt	Nicholas Smith	Noah Smith	River McCluskey	Iqaluit CC, Iqaluit
Ontario	Tyler MacTavish	Liam Rowe	Alec Symeonides	Connor Elkins	Nathan Thomas	KW Granite Club, Waterloo
Prince Edward Island	Isaiah Dalton	Keegan Warnell	Sheamus Herlihy	Colin Waite		Cornwall CC, Cornwall; Summerside CC, Summerside
Quebec 1	Raphaël Tremblay	Louis-François Brassard	Nathan Beaudoin Gendron	Gabriel Audette		CC Grand-Mère, Grand-Mère
Quebec 2	Zachary Janidlo	Owen Paterson	Nicolas Janidlo	Coby Olszewski	Cole Richard	Pointe-Claire CC, Pointe-Claire
Saskatchewan 1	Brandon Weiss	Josh Lussier	Carter Nelson	Elijah Chomos	Tyler Derksen	Esterhazy CC, Esterhazy
Saskatchewan 2	Dayne Heisler	Blake Montgomery	Riley Cushway	Laine Burnham		Moose Jaw CC, Moose Jaw
Yukon	Aaron Solberg	Nolan Floyd	Nico Fecteau	Roman Snider		Whitehorse CC, Whitehorse

=== Round robin standings ===
Final Round Robin Standings

Key
Teams to Playoffs

Pool A	Skip	W	L
Nova Scotia 1	Zach Atherton	6	0
Quebec 1	Raphaël Tremblay	5	1
Saskatchewan 1	Brandon Weiss	4	2
Manitoba 2	Logan Zacharias	3	3
New Brunswick 2	Evan Hanson	2	4
Yukon	Aaron Solberg	1	5
Northwest Territories	Jasper Willkomm	0	6

Pool B	Skip	W	L
Quebec 2	Zachary Janidlo	6	0
Manitoba 1	Nash Sugden	5	1
Alberta 2	Austin Hennig	4	2
British Columbia	Owen Jaeger	3	3
Prince Edward Island	Isaiah Dalton	2	4
Newfoundland and Labrador 1	Ephram Noel	1	5
Nunavut	Ciaran Robinson	0	6

Pool C	Skip	W	L
Ontario	Tyler MacTavish	6	0
Alberta 1	Peter Hlushak	5	1
Saskatchewan 2	Dayne Heisler	3	3
Northern Ontario	Justin MacKay	3	3
Newfoundland and Labrador 2	Zachery French	2	4
Nova Scotia 2	Elex Lockhart	1	5
New Brunswick 1	Sahil Dalrymple	1	5

=== Round robin results ===
All draw times are listed in Central Time (UTC−06:00).

==== Draw 1 ====
Monday, February 17, 8:30 am

Sheet A	1	2	3	4	5	6	7	8	Final
Alberta 1 (Hlushak) 🔨	1	0	2	2	0	3	1	X	9
Saskatchewan 2 (Heisler)	0	1	0	0	2	0	0	X	3

Sheet E	1	2	3	4	5	6	7	8	Final
Nova Scotia 1 (Atherton)	6	3	2	1	0	1	X	X	13
New Brunswick 2 (Hanson) 🔨	0	0	0	0	1	0	X	X	1

Sheet F	1	2	3	4	5	6	7	8	Final
Manitoba 2 (Zacharias) 🔨	3	0	0	0	4	1	X	X	8
Northwest Territories (Willkomm)	0	1	0	0	0	0	X	X	1

Sheet G	1	2	3	4	5	6	7	8	Final
Quebec 1 (Tremblay)	0	2	0	0	3	0	0	2	7
Saskatchewan 1 (Weiss) 🔨	0	0	1	2	0	0	2	0	5

==== Draw 2 ====
Monday, February 17, 12:30 pm

Sheet D	1	2	3	4	5	6	7	8	Final
Nunavut (Robinson)	0	1	0	0	0	0	1	0	2
Quebec 2 (Janidlo) 🔨	3	0	2	1	2	1	0	1	10

Sheet F	1	2	3	4	5	6	7	8	Final
British Columbia (Jaeger) 🔨	0	2	0	0	0	1	0	0	3
Manitoba 1 (Sugden)	1	0	2	0	0	0	2	1	6

==== Draw 3 ====
Monday, February 17, 4:30 pm

Sheet A	1	2	3	4	5	6	7	8	Final
Northern Ontario (MacKay)	0	0	0	2	0	1	0	X	3
Ontario (MacTavish) 🔨	1	0	2	0	3	0	0	X	6

Sheet C	1	2	3	4	5	6	7	8	Final
Northwest Territories (Willkomm) 🔨	0	0	0	0	1	0	X	X	1
Quebec 1 (Tremblay)	0	2	3	1	0	3	X	X	9

Sheet E	1	2	3	4	5	6	7	8	Final
Saskatchewan 2 (Heisler)	0	1	0	3	0	2	0	0	6
New Brunswick 1 (Dalrymple) 🔨	2	0	2	0	3	0	1	1	9

==== Draw 4 ====
Monday, February 17, 8:30 pm

Sheet A	1	2	3	4	5	6	7	8	Final
Yukon (Solberg) 🔨	1	0	0	0	0	1	1	X	3
Manitoba 2 (Zacharias)	0	3	1	1	2	0	0	X	7

Sheet B	1	2	3	4	5	6	7	8	Final
Manitoba 1 (Sugden) 🔨	0	2	0	2	0	1	2	X	7
Alberta 2 (Hennig)	1	0	1	0	1	0	0	X	3

Sheet F	1	2	3	4	5	6	7	8	Final
Saskatchewan 1 (Weiss)	0	0	1	0	1	0	0	X	2
Nova Scotia 1 (Atherton) 🔨	1	0	0	1	0	4	1	X	7

Sheet G	1	2	3	4	5	6	7	8	Final
British Columbia (Jaeger)	1	1	0	0	1	0	0	X	3
Quebec 2 (Janidlo) 🔨	0	0	2	1	0	4	5	X	12

==== Draw 5 ====
Tuesday, February 18, 8:30 am

Sheet C	1	2	3	4	5	6	7	8	Final
Saskatchewan 2 (Heisler) 🔨	1	0	0	1	2	2	1	X	7
Newfoundland and Labrador 2 (French)	0	4	0	0	0	0	0	X	4

Sheet D	1	2	3	4	5	6	7	8	Final
Nova Scotia 1 (Atherton) 🔨	1	1	4	2	0	1	X	X	9
Yukon (Solberg)	0	0	0	0	1	0	X	X	1

Sheet E	1	2	3	4	5	6	7	8	Final
Ontario 1 (MacTavish) 🔨	0	2	0	0	2	4	X	X	8
Alberta 1 (Hlushak)	1	0	0	1	0	0	X	X	2

Sheet F	1	2	3	4	5	6	7	8	Final
Alberta 2 (Hennig) 🔨	5	2	3	3	5	0	0	X	18
Nunavut (Robinson)	0	0	0	0	0	3	1	X	4

==== Draw 6 ====
Tuesday, February 18, 12:30 pm

Sheet C	1	2	3	4	5	6	7	8	Final
Nunavut (Robinson)	0	0	1	0	0	0	X	X	1
Manitoba 1 (Sugden) 🔨	3	3	0	3	6	6	X	X	21

Sheet F	1	2	3	4	5	6	7	8	Final
Manitoba 2 (Zacharias) 🔨	0	0	0	1	0	1	1	0	3
Saskatchewan 1 (Weiss)	1	2	0	0	0	0	0	1	4

Sheet G	1	2	3	4	5	6	7	8	Final
Newfoundland and Labrador 2 (French)	1	0	0	1	0	0	1	0	3
Northern Ontario (MacKay) 🔨	0	0	1	0	2	0	0	1	4

==== Draw 7 ====
Tuesday, February 18, 4:30 pm

Sheet A	1	2	3	4	5	6	7	8	9	Final
Alberta 2 (Hennig) 🔨	2	0	0	2	0	0	1	0	2	7
British Columbia (Jaeger)	0	0	3	0	0	1	0	1	0	5

Sheet B	1	2	3	4	5	6	7	8	Final
Northwest Territories (Willkomm)	0	0	0	0	0	1	X	X	1
Nova Scotia 1 (Atherton) 🔨	1	1	5	2	2	0	X	X	11

Sheet C	1	2	3	4	5	6	7	8	Final
Alberta 1 (Hlushak) 🔨	1	0	0	1	0	3	1	X	6
Northern Ontario (MacKay)	0	2	1	0	1	0	0	X	4

Sheet F	1	2	3	4	5	6	7	8	9	Final
Quebec 1 (Tremblay) 🔨	2	0	0	2	0	0	1	0	1	6
Yukon (Solberg)	0	0	2	0	1	0	0	2	0	5

Sheet G	1	2	3	4	5	6	7	8	Final
New Brunswick 2 (Hanson)	0	1	0	0	0	1	0	X	2
Manitoba 2 (Zacharias) 🔨	1	0	0	1	1	0	1	X	4

==== Draw 8 ====
Tuesday, February 18, 8:30 pm

Sheet B	1	2	3	4	5	6	7	8	Final
New Brunswick 2 (Hanson)	0	1	0	1	0	1	0	X	3
Quebec 1 (Tremblay) 🔨	2	0	1	0	4	0	4	X	11

Sheet C	1	2	3	4	5	6	7	8	Final
New Brunswick 1 (Dalrymple)	0	1	0	0	1	0	1	0	3
Ontario (MacTavish) 🔨	0	0	1	2	0	1	0	1	5

Sheet G	1	2	3	4	5	6	7	8	9	Final
Quebec 2 (Janidlo) 🔨	1	0	2	0	2	0	1	0	2	8
Manitoba 1 (Sugden)	0	1	0	0	0	2	0	3	0	6

==== Draw 9 ====
Wednesday, February 19, 8:30 am

Sheet C	1	2	3	4	5	6	7	8	Final
Nova Scotia 2 (Lockhart) 🔨	1	1	0	2	0	0	0	X	4
Newfoundland and Labrador 2 (French)	0	0	3	0	1	2	1	X	7

Sheet D	1	2	3	4	5	6	7	8	Final
Alberta 1 (Hlushak)	0	2	0	0	0	3	2	X	7
New Brunswick 1 (Dalrymple) 🔨	1	0	0	0	1	0	0	X	2

Sheet E	1	2	3	4	5	6	7	8	Final
Alberta 2 (Hennig)	0	1	0	1	0	0	X	X	2
Quebec 2 (Janidlo) 🔨	3	0	1	0	2	3	X	X	9

Sheet G	1	2	3	4	5	6	7	8	Final
Newfoundland and Labrador 1 (Noel) 🔨	3	2	5	2	5	0	X	X	17
Nunavut (Robinson)	0	0	0	0	0	3	X	X	3

==== Draw 10 ====
Wednesday, February 19, 12:30 pm

Sheet A	1	2	3	4	5	6	7	8	Final
Manitoba 1 (Sugden) 🔨	0	2	4	0	1	1	X	X	8
Newfoundland and Labrador 1 (Noel)	0	0	0	1	0	0	X	X	1

Sheet B	1	2	3	4	5	6	7	8	Final
Saskatchewan 2 (Heisler) 🔨	0	0	2	0	0	2	0	X	4
Ontario (MacTavish)	2	2	0	0	1	0	2	X	7

Sheet C	1	2	3	4	5	6	7	8	Final
Saskatchewan 1 (Weiss) 🔨	1	0	0	2	0	1	1	X	5
New Brunswick 2 (Hanson)	0	1	0	0	0	0	0	X	1

Sheet G	1	2	3	4	5	6	7	8	Final
Prince Edward Island (Dalton)	0	0	1	0	0	1	X	X	2
Alberta 2 (Hennig) 🔨	3	2	0	3	2	0	X	X	10

==== Draw 11 ====
Wednesday, February 19, 4:30 pm

Sheet A	1	2	3	4	5	6	7	8	Final
Newfoundland and Labrador 2 (French) 🔨	1	1	0	1	0	1	0	1	5
New Brunswick 1 (Dalrymple)	0	0	1	0	1	0	2	0	4

Sheet C	1	2	3	4	5	6	7	8	Final
Prince Edward Island (Dalton)	1	0	1	1	2	0	0	X	5
British Columbia (Jaeger) 🔨	0	2	0	0	0	6	1	X	9

Sheet F	1	2	3	4	5	6	7	8	Final
Ontario (MacTavish) 🔨	4	2	3	0	0	2	X	X	11
Nova Scotia 2 (Lockhart)	0	0	0	1	2	0	X	X	3

Sheet G	1	2	3	4	5	6	7	8	Final
Yukon (Solberg)	2	2	0	0	2	3	0	X	9
Northwest Territories (Willkomm) 🔨	0	0	2	2	0	0	1	X	5

==== Draw 12 ====
Wednesday, February 19, 8:30 pm

Sheet C	1	2	3	4	5	6	7	8	Final
Northern Ontario (MacKay)	1	0	0	2	0	2	0	2	7
Saskatchewan 2 (Heisler) 🔨	0	1	1	0	2	0	4	0	8

Sheet D	1	2	3	4	5	6	7	8	Final
Quebec 2 (Janidlo) 🔨	2	0	2	0	4	1	X	X	9
Newfoundland and Labrador 1 (Noel)	0	1	0	1	0	0	X	X	2

Sheet E	1	2	3	4	5	6	7	8	Final
Nova Scotia 2 (Lockhart)	0	0	0	0	1	1	0	X	2
Alberta 1 (Hlushak) 🔨	0	2	2	3	0	0	1	X	8

==== Draw 13 ====
Thursday, February 20, 8:30 am

Sheet C	1	2	3	4	5	6	7	8	Final
Quebec 1 (Tremblay) 🔨	0	2	3	0	0	0	0	3	8
Manitoba 2 (Zacharias)	3	0	0	0	2	1	1	0	7

Sheet D	1	2	3	4	5	6	7	8	Final
New Brunswick 2 (Hanson) 🔨	2	0	0	2	2	0	1	X	7
Northwest Territories (Willkomm)	0	0	0	0	0	1	0	X	1

Sheet G	1	2	3	4	5	6	7	8	Final
Quebec 2 (Janidlo)	0	1	1	1	4	3	X	X	10
Prince Edward Island (Dalton) 🔨	2	0	0	0	0	0	X	X	2

==== Draw 14 ====
Thursday, February 20, 12:30 pm

Sheet B	1	2	3	4	5	6	7	8	Final
Manitoba 1 (Sugden)	0	2	1	0	2	1	0	X	6
Prince Edward Island (Dalton) 🔨	0	0	0	1	0	0	1	X	2

Sheet D	1	2	3	4	5	6	7	8	Final
Newfoundland and Labrador 1 (Noel)	0	0	0	0	1	0	1	X	2
Alberta 2 (Hennig) 🔨	1	0	3	0	0	1	0	X	5

Sheet G	1	2	3	4	5	6	7	8	Final
Northern Ontario (MacKay)	0	1	1	0	3	2	0	X	7
Nova Scotia 2 (Lockhart) 🔨	2	0	0	1	0	0	1	X	4

==== Draw 15 ====
Thursday, February 20, 4:30 pm

Sheet C	1	2	3	4	5	6	7	8	Final
Nunavut (Robinson)	0	0	0	0	1	1	0	X	2
Prince Edward Island (Dalton) 🔨	5	4	1	5	0	0	1	X	16

Sheet D	1	2	3	4	5	6	7	8	Final
Manitoba 2 (Zacharias)	0	0	0	2	0	2	X	X	4
Nova Scotia 1 (Atherton) 🔨	5	2	1	0	3	0	X	X	11

Sheet E	1	2	3	4	5	6	7	8	Final
Saskatchewan 1 (Weiss) 🔨	1	1	0	5	0	2	X	X	9
Yukon (Solberg)	0	0	1	0	1	0	X	X	2

Sheet G	1	2	3	4	5	6	7	8	Final
Newfoundland and Labrador 1 (Noel)	0	1	2	0	0	1	0	0	4
British Columbia (Jaeger) 🔨	1	0	0	2	1	0	1	3	8

==== Draw 16 ====
Thursday, February 20, 8:30 pm

Sheet B	1	2	3	4	5	6	7	8	9	Final
New Brunswick 1 (Dalrymple)	0	0	0	1	1	0	2	0	0	4
Northern Ontario (MacKay) 🔨	0	0	2	0	0	1	0	1	1	5

Sheet D	1	2	3	4	5	6	7	8	Final
Nova Scotia 2 (Lockhart)	0	0	0	0	1	1	0	0	2
Saskatchewan 2 (Heisler) 🔨	2	0	0	0	0	0	0	2	4

Sheet F	1	2	3	4	5	6	7	8	Final
Newfoundland and Labrador 2 (French) 🔨	0	0	2	0	1	0	X	X	3
Alberta 1 (Hlushak)	0	3	0	2	0	5	X	X	10

==== Draw 17 ====
Friday, February 21, 8:30 am

Sheet A	1	2	3	4	5	6	7	8	Final
Northwest Territories (Willkomm)	0	2	0	0	0	1	X	X	3
Saskatchewan 1 (Weiss) 🔨	4	0	6	2	4	0	X	X	16

Sheet B	1	2	3	4	5	6	7	8	Final
Nova Scotia 1 (Atherton) 🔨	2	1	1	0	0	0	2	2	8
Quebec 1 (Tremblay)	0	0	0	1	1	2	0	0	4

Sheet C	1	2	3	4	5	6	7	8	Final
British Columbia (Jaeger) 🔨	4	3	5	1	1	0	X	X	14
Nunavut (Robinson)	0	0	0	0	0	3	X	X	3

==== Draw 18 ====
Friday, February 21, 12:30 pm

Sheet A	1	2	3	4	5	6	7	8	Final
New Brunswick 1 (Dalrymple) 🔨	0	0	1	1	0	1	0	X	3
Nova Scotia 2 (Lockhart)	1	0	0	0	1	0	4	X	6

Sheet B	1	2	3	4	5	6	7	8	Final
Ontario (MacTavish) 🔨	3	0	4	1	3	3	X	X	14
Newfoundland and Labrador 2 (French)	0	1	0	0	0	0	X	X	1

Sheet D	1	2	3	4	5	6	7	8	Final
Yukon (Solberg)	0	0	2	0	0	0	X	X	2
New Brunswick 2 (Hanson) 🔨	3	0	0	2	0	3	X	X	8

Sheet E	1	2	3	4	5	6	7	8	Final
Prince Edward Island (Dalton)	2	0	0	0	0	1	1	3	7
Newfoundland and Labrador 1 (Noel) 🔨	0	3	1	1	1	0	0	0	6

=== Playoffs ===
Qualification Games
8	Saskatchewan 1	3
9	Saskatchewan 2	5
7	Alberta 2	5
10	Manitoba 2	6

Quarterfinals
1	Nova Scotia 1	5
9	Saskatchewan 2	4
4	Manitoba 1	5
5	Alberta 1	7
3	Quebec 2	5
6	Quebec 1	4
2	Ontario	5
10	Manitoba 2	1

Semifinals
1	Nova Scotia 1	7
5	Alberta 1	4
3	Quebec 2	2
2	Ontario	9

Final
1	Nova Scotia 1	7
2	Ontario	1

==== Qualification games ====
Friday, February 21, 4:30 pm

Sheet C	1	2	3	4	5	6	7	8	Final
Saskatchewan 1 (Weiss) 🔨	1	0	0	1	0	0	1	0	3
Saskatchewan 2 (Heisler)	0	1	1	0	0	2	0	1	5

Sheet G	1	2	3	4	5	6	7	8	Final
Alberta 2 (Hennig)	0	0	1	0	0	3	1	0	5
Manitoba 2 (Zacharias) 🔨	0	0	0	2	2	0	0	2	6

==== Quarterfinals ====
Friday, February 21, 4:30 pm

Sheet F	1	2	3	4	5	6	7	8	9	Final
Manitoba 1 (Sugden)	0	2	0	1	0	1	0	1	0	5
Alberta 1 (Hlushak) 🔨	0	0	2	0	2	0	1	0	2	7

Friday, February 21, 8:30 pm

Sheet A	1	2	3	4	5	6	7	8	Final
Nova Scotia 1 (Atherton) 🔨	1	1	0	0	0	1	0	2	5
Saskatchewan 2 (Heisler)	0	0	0	1	1	0	2	0	4

Sheet B	1	2	3	4	5	6	7	8	Final
Quebec 2 (Janidlo)	0	0	1	0	2	0	0	2	5
Quebec 1 (Tremblay) 🔨	0	1	0	2	0	1	0	0	4

Sheet F	1	2	3	4	5	6	7	8	Final
Ontario (MacTavish) 🔨	0	0	3	2	0	0	0	X	5
Manitoba 2 (Zacharias)	1	0	0	0	0	0	0	X	1

==== Semifinals ====
Saturday, February 22, 12:30 pm

Sheet A	1	2	3	4	5	6	7	8	Final
Quebec 2 (Janidlo) 🔨	0	0	0	1	1	0	X	X	2
Ontario (MacTavish)	0	3	2	0	0	4	X	X	9

Sheet B	1	2	3	4	5	6	7	8	Final
Nova Scotia 1 (Atherton) 🔨	0	1	0	3	0	0	3	X	7
Alberta 1 (Hlushak)	0	0	1	0	2	1	0	X	4

==== Final ====
Saturday, February 22, 4:00 pm

Sheet C	1	2	3	4	5	6	7	8	Final
Nova Scotia 1 (Atherton) 🔨	3	2	0	0	1	1	X	X	7
Ontario (MacTavish)	0	0	1	0	0	0	X	X	1

=== Consolation ===
==== A Bracket ====
For Seeds 3 to 10

Bronze medal game
5	Alberta 1	5
3	Quebec 2	6

5th–8th
9	Saskatchewan 2	2
4	Manitoba 1	8

5th–8th
6	Quebec 1	11
10	Manitoba 2	3

9th/10th
8	Saskatchewan 1	8
7	Alberta 2	4

==== B Bracket ====
For Seeds 11 to 21

11th/12th
11	Northern Ontario	8
12	British Columbia	3

13th/14th
13	New Brunswick 2	7
14	Newfoundland and Labrador 2	4

15th/16th
15	Prince Edward Island	3
16	New Brunswick 1	9

17th/18th
17	Nova Scotia 2	7
18	Yukon	2

			19th/20th
			19	Newfoundland and Labrador 1	W
20	Northwest Territories	W/O	20	Northwest Territories	L
21	Nunavut	L

=== Final standings ===
Place	Team
1st place, gold medalist(s)	Nova Scotia 1
2nd place, silver medalist(s)	Ontario
3rd place, bronze medalist(s)	Quebec 2
4	Alberta 1
5	Manitoba 1
6	Quebec 1
7	Saskatchewan 2
8	Manitoba 2
9	Saskatchewan 1
10	Alberta 2
11	Northern Ontario
12	British Columbia
13	New Brunswick 2
14	Newfoundland and Labrador 2
15	New Brunswick 1
16	Prince Edward Island
17	Nova Scotia 2
18	Yukon
19	Newfoundland and Labrador 1
20	Northwest Territories
21	Nunavut

== Women ==
=== Teams ===
The teams are listed as follows:

Province / Territory	Skip	Third	Second	Lead	Alternate	Club(s)
Alberta 1	Alena Yurko	Reese Morison	Abby Mielke	Kendra Koch		North Hill CC, Calgary; Crestwood CC, Edmonton
Alberta 2	Abby Desormeau	Julia Kennedy	Molly Whitbread	Savannah Dutka	Camryn Adams	Beaumont CC, Beaumont; Red Deer CC, Red Deer
British Columbia 1	Ava Arndt	Bethany Evans	Ivy Jensen	Alicia Evans		Vernon CC, Vernon; Kamloops CC, Kamloops
British Columbia 2	Megan Rempel	Parker Rempel	Gwyneth Jones	Ella Walker		Kelowna CC, Kelowna; Penticton CC, Penticton
Manitoba 1	Caitlyn McPherson	Julie Magnusson	Robyn Buchel	Jorja Buhr		Gimli CC, Gimli
Manitoba 2	Karys Buchalter	Ainslee Card	Amy Buchalter	Evangeline Le Heiget		West St. Paul CC, West St. Paul
New Brunswick	Kate Gaines	Kylie Spadoni	Alexandria Pope	Karlyn Jacobson		Gage Golf & CC, Oromocto
Newfoundland and Labrador 1	Cailey Locke	Hayley Gushue	Sitaye Penney	Marissa Gushue		RE/MAX Centre, St. John's
Newfoundland and Labrador 2	Kyla Walsh	Mya Ivany	Austyn Boone	Rory Linstead		RE/MAX Centre, St. John's
Northern Ontario	Claire Dubinsky	Rylie Paul	Bella McCarville	Lily Ariganello	Samantha Bergamo	Kakabeka Falls CC, Kakabeka Falls
Northwest Territories	Reese Wainman	Alexandria Testart-Campbell	Brooke Smith	Tamara Bain		Inuvik CC, Inuvik
Nova Scotia 1	Cassidy Blades	Stephanie Atherton	Anna MacNutt	Lily Mitchell		Halifax CC, Halifax
Nova Scotia 2	Olivia Gouthro	Lily MacDonald	Ellie Tully	Annelise LeBlanc	Olivia McDonah	Truro CC, Truro
Nunavut	Arianna Mae Atienza	Sophia MacDonald	Naja Jane Ejesiak	Aubrey Agluvak Sheppard		Iqaluit CC, Iqaluit
Ontario 1	Katrina Frlan	Erika Wainwright	Samantha Wall	Lauren Norman		Huntley CC, Carp
Ontario 2	Charlotte Wilson	Amelia Benning	Abby Rushton	Sydney Anderson		Rideau CC, Ottawa
Prince Edward Island	Veronica Pater	Kacey Gauthier	Sophie Gallant	Ashlyn MacDonald		Cornwall CC, Cornwall
Quebec 1	Anaïs Morissette	Marylee Brochet	Léanne Bergeron	Alice Beauchesne		CC Etchemin, Saint-Romuald
Quebec 2	Summer St-James	Cassandra Roy	Emma Nguyen	Madeline Nguyen		Pointe-Claire CC, Pointe-Claire
Saskatchewan 1	Kaylee Hogeboom	Payton Fisher	Abby Hogeboom	Callista McQueen	Kelsey McQueen	Moose Jaw CC, Moose Jaw
Saskatchewan 2	Renée Wood	Edie Jardine	Amelia Whiting	Winnie Morin	Amy Fradette	Sutherland CC, Saskatoon

=== Round robin standings ===
Final Round Robin Standings

Key
Teams to Playoffs

Pool A	Skip	W	L
Nova Scotia 1	Cassidy Blades	6	0
Ontario 1	Katrina Frlan	4	2
Manitoba 2	Karys Buchalter	3	3
Newfoundland and Labrador 1	Cailey Locke	3	3
Northwest Territories	Reese Wainman	3	3
British Columbia 2	Megan Rempel	2	4
Nunavut	Arianna Atienza	0	6

Pool B	Skip	W	L
Alberta 1	Alena Yurko	5	1
New Brunswick	Kate Gaines	4	2
Quebec 2	Summer St-James	4	2
Manitoba 1	Caitlyn McPherson	3	3
Saskatchewan 1	Kaylee Hogeboom	3	3
Nova Scotia 2	Olivia Gouthro	1	5
Newfoundland and Labrador 2	Kyla Walsh	1	5

Pool C	Skip	W	L
Alberta 2	Abby Desormeau	6	0
Saskatchewan 2	Renée Wood	4	2
British Columbia 1	Ava Arndt	4	2
Northern Ontario	Claire Dubinsky	3	3
Ontario 2	Charlotte Wilson	3	3
Quebec 1	Anaïs Morissette	1	5
Prince Edward Island	Veronica Pater	0	6

=== Round robin results ===
All draw times are listed in Central Time (UTC−06:00).

==== Draw 1 ====
Monday, February 17, 8:30 am

Sheet B	1	2	3	4	5	6	7	8	Final
Saskatchewan 2 (Wood)	2	1	2	0	0	0	0	0	5
Ontario 2 (Wilson) 🔨	0	0	0	5	1	0	1	1	8

Sheet C	1	2	3	4	5	6	7	8	Final
Alberta 2 (Desormeau) 🔨	3	2	0	2	0	2	X	X	9
British Columbia 1 (Arndt)	0	0	2	0	1	0	X	X	3

Sheet D	1	2	3	4	5	6	7	8	Final
Quebec 1 (Morissette)	1	0	0	0	1	0	0	X	2
Northern Ontario (Dubinsky) 🔨	0	0	3	0	0	2	1	X	6

==== Draw 2 ====
Monday, February 17, 12:30 pm

Sheet A	1	2	3	4	5	6	7	8	Final
Northwest Territories (Wainman) 🔨	0	1	0	0	1	0	1	X	3
Ontario 1 (Frlan)	2	0	1	2	0	1	0	X	6

Sheet B	1	2	3	4	5	6	7	8	Final
Nunavut (Atienza)	0	0	0	0	3	0	X	X	3
Nova Scotia 1 (Blades) 🔨	4	4	5	2	0	1	X	X	16

Sheet C	1	2	3	4	5	6	7	8	Final
Newfoundland and Labrador 1 (Locke)	0	2	0	0	2	0	2	0	6
Manitoba 2 (Buchalter) 🔨	1	0	0	2	0	1	0	1	5

Sheet E	1	2	3	4	5	6	7	8	Final
Newfoundland and Labrador 2 (Walsh) 🔨	0	1	0	1	0	1	0	3	6
Alberta 1 (Yurko)	0	0	2	0	1	0	2	0	5

Sheet G	1	2	3	4	5	6	7	8	Final
Manitoba 1 (McPherson)	5	0	0	0	1	0	0	1	7
New Brunswick (Gaines) 🔨	0	1	1	1	0	2	1	0	6

==== Draw 3 ====
Monday, February 17, 4:30 pm

Sheet B	1	2	3	4	5	6	7	8	Final
Quebec 2 (St-James)	0	0	1	0	0	3	1	1	6
Newfoundland and Labrador 2 (Walsh) 🔨	1	1	0	1	1	0	0	0	4

Sheet D	1	2	3	4	5	6	7	8	Final
Alberta 2 (Desormeau) 🔨	1	0	0	1	0	5	0	X	7
Quebec 1 (Morissette)	0	0	1	0	1	0	1	X	3

Sheet F	1	2	3	4	5	6	7	8	Final
Saskatchewan 1 (Hogeboom)	1	0	1	0	0	1	0	X	3
Alberta 1 (Yurko) 🔨	0	1	0	3	1	0	1	X	6

Sheet G	1	2	3	4	5	6	7	8	9	Final
British Columbia 1 (Arndt) 🔨	0	1	0	2	1	0	2	0	0	6
Saskatchewan 2 (Wood)	1	0	3	0	0	1	0	1	1	7

==== Draw 4 ====
Monday, February 17, 8:30 pm

Sheet C	1	2	3	4	5	6	7	8	Final
Nova Scotia 1 (Blades) 🔨	2	2	1	0	0	1	1	X	7
Northwest Territories (Wainman)	0	0	0	2	2	0	0	X	4

Sheet D	1	2	3	4	5	6	7	8	Final
Ontario 1 (Frlan) 🔨	2	0	0	0	6	1	0	X	9
Newfoundland and Labrador 1 (Locke)	0	0	2	1	0	0	1	X	4

Sheet E	1	2	3	4	5	6	7	8	Final
British Columbia 2 (Rempel) 🔨	1	1	0	3	1	1	1	X	8
Nunavut (Atienza)	0	0	3	0	0	0	0	X	3

==== Draw 5 ====
Tuesday, February 18, 8:30 am

Sheet A	1	2	3	4	5	6	7	8	Final
Saskatchewan 1 (Hogeboom) 🔨	0	1	0	3	3	0	1	X	8
Manitoba 1 (McPherson)	1	0	1	0	0	3	0	X	5

Sheet B	1	2	3	4	5	6	7	8	Final
Alberta 1 (Yurko)	1	1	1	2	1	0	1	X	7
New Brunswick (Gaines) 🔨	0	0	0	0	0	1	0	X	1

Sheet G	1	2	3	4	5	6	7	8	Final
Northern Ontario (Dubinsky) 🔨	0	0	4	0	2	1	0	X	7
Ontario 2 (Wilson)	0	2	0	1	0	0	1	X	4

==== Draw 6 ====
Tuesday, February 18, 12:30 pm

Sheet A	1	2	3	4	5	6	7	8	Final
Nova Scotia 1 (Blades)	0	1	0	0	3	0	1	2	7
Newfoundland and Labrador 1 (Locke) 🔨	2	0	1	0	0	2	0	0	5

Sheet B	1	2	3	4	5	6	7	8	Final
Northwest Territories (Wainman)	0	1	2	0	2	0	0	1	6
British Columbia 2 (Rempel) 🔨	1	0	0	2	0	0	2	0	5

Sheet D	1	2	3	4	5	6	7	8	Final
Manitoba 2 (Buchalter) 🔨	0	4	0	4	1	0	2	X	11
Nunavut (Atienza)	1	0	1	0	0	2	0	X	4

Sheet E	1	2	3	4	5	6	7	8	Final
Newfoundland and Labrador 2 (Walsh)	0	0	2	1	0	4	0	0	7
Manitoba 1 (McPherson) 🔨	1	0	0	0	4	0	2	1	8

==== Draw 7 ====
Tuesday, February 18, 4:30 pm

Sheet D	1	2	3	4	5	6	7	8	Final
Quebec 2 (St-James) 🔨	3	0	1	2	0	2	0	X	8
Saskatchewan 1 (Hogeboom)	0	2	0	0	1	0	1	X	4

Sheet E	1	2	3	4	5	6	7	8	Final
Nunavut (Atienza)	0	0	1	0	1	0	X	X	2
Ontario 1 (Frlan) 🔨	3	2	0	3	0	2	X	X	10

==== Draw 8 ====
Tuesday, February 18, 8:30 pm

Sheet A	1	2	3	4	5	6	7	8	Final
Quebec 1 (Morissette)	1	1	0	1	0	0	2	0	5
British Columbia 1 (Arndt) 🔨	0	0	1	0	5	1	0	1	8

Sheet D	1	2	3	4	5	6	7	8	Final
Ontario 2 (Wilson) 🔨	1	0	1	0	1	0	1	X	4
Alberta 2 (Desormeau)	0	2	0	3	0	1	0	X	6

Sheet E	1	2	3	4	5	6	7	8	Final
Saskatchewan 2 (Wood) 🔨	0	0	1	1	0	1	1	1	5
Northern Ontario (Dubinsky)	0	2	0	0	1	0	0	0	3

Sheet F	1	2	3	4	5	6	7	8	Final
Newfoundland and Labrador 1 (Locke) 🔨	0	0	1	1	0	0	1	X	3
British Columbia 2 (Rempel)	0	0	0	0	0	1	0	X	1

==== Draw 9 ====
Wednesday, February 19, 8:30 am

Sheet A	1	2	3	4	5	6	7	8	Final
Manitoba 2 (Buchalter)	0	2	2	0	1	0	0	2	7
Northwest Territories (Wainman) 🔨	2	0	0	2	0	1	1	0	6

Sheet B	1	2	3	4	5	6	7	8	Final
Saskatchewan 1 (Hogeboom) 🔨	0	1	1	0	2	2	2	X	8
Newfoundland and Labrador 2 (Walsh)	0	0	0	2	0	0	0	X	2

Sheet F	1	2	3	4	5	6	7	8	Final
New Brunswick (Gaines) 🔨	1	0	1	0	3	0	0	1	6
Quebec 2 (St-James)	0	1	0	2	0	1	1	0	5

==== Draw 10 ====
Wednesday, February 19, 12:30 pm

Sheet D	1	2	3	4	5	6	7	8	Final
Ontario 2 (Wilson) 🔨	0	1	0	0	3	1	1	X	6
Quebec 1 (Morissette)	1	0	0	1	0	0	0	X	2

Sheet E	1	2	3	4	5	6	7	8	Final
Alberta 1 (Yurko) 🔨	3	0	0	0	2	2	1	X	8
Nova Scotia 2 (Gouthro)	0	2	1	1	0	0	0	X	4

Sheet F	1	2	3	4	5	6	7	8	Final
Northern Ontario (Dubinsky)	0	1	2	0	4	3	X	X	10
Prince Edward Island (Pater) 🔨	1	0	0	1	0	0	X	X	2

==== Draw 11 ====
Wednesday, February 19, 4:30 pm

Sheet B	1	2	3	4	5	6	7	8	Final
Ontario 1 (Frlan)	0	0	0	0	2	1	1	0	4
Manitoba 2 (Buchalter) 🔨	0	0	2	1	0	0	0	2	5

Sheet D	1	2	3	4	5	6	7	8	Final
Prince Edward Island (Pater) 🔨	1	0	0	0	0	1	0	X	2
Alberta 2 (Desormeau)	0	0	3	1	0	0	2	X	6

Sheet E	1	2	3	4	5	6	7	8	Final
New Brunswick (Gaines) 🔨	1	0	1	0	1	3	0	1	7
Newfoundland and Labrador 2 (Walsh)	0	1	0	1	0	0	2	0	4

==== Draw 12 ====
Wednesday, February 19, 8:30 pm

Sheet A	1	2	3	4	5	6	7	8	9	Final
British Columbia 2 (Rempel) 🔨	0	1	0	1	0	1	0	2	0	5
Nova Scotia 1 (Blades)	1	0	1	0	2	0	1	0	1	6

Sheet B	1	2	3	4	5	6	7	8	Final
Nova Scotia 2 (Gouthro) 🔨	0	0	1	0	0	1	0	X	2
Quebec 2 (St-James)	1	0	0	3	2	0	1	X	7

Sheet F	1	2	3	4	5	6	7	8	Final
Northwest Territories (Wainman) 🔨	2	1	0	3	0	1	0	X	7
Nunavut (Atienza)	0	0	1	0	1	0	1	X	3

Sheet G	1	2	3	4	5	6	7	8	Final
Manitoba 1 (McPherson) 🔨	0	1	1	0	0	1	1	0	4
Alberta 1 (Yurko)	2	0	0	1	1	0	0	2	6

==== Draw 13 ====
Thursday, February 20, 8:30 am

Sheet A	1	2	3	4	5	6	7	8	Final
Saskatchewan 2 (Wood)	0	0	0	2	0	0	2	0	4
Alberta 2 (Desormeau) 🔨	0	1	2	0	1	1	0	1	6

Sheet B	1	2	3	4	5	6	7	8	Final
Prince Edward Island (Pater)	0	0	0	1	0	0	X	X	1
Quebec 1 (Morissette) 🔨	3	2	1	0	1	3	X	X	10

Sheet E	1	2	3	4	5	6	7	8	9	Final
British Columbia 1 (Arndt)	0	2	0	1	1	0	3	0	1	8
Ontario 2 (Wilson) 🔨	0	0	2	0	0	3	0	2	0	7

Sheet F	1	2	3	4	5	6	7	8	Final
Manitoba 2 (Buchalter)	0	0	2	0	0	2	0	0	4
Nova Scotia 1 (Blades) 🔨	1	0	0	1	2	0	0	2	6

==== Draw 14 ====
Thursday, February 20, 12:30 pm

Sheet A	1	2	3	4	5	6	7	8	Final
Nova Scotia 2 (Gouthro) 🔨	0	0	2	0	0	0	1	X	3
New Brunswick (Gaines)	1	1	0	0	2	3	0	X	7

Sheet C	1	2	3	4	5	6	7	8	Final
Ontario 1 (Frlan)	0	0	1	0	3	3	2	X	9
British Columbia 2 (Rempel) 🔨	0	2	0	1	0	0	0	X	3

Sheet E	1	2	3	4	5	6	7	8	Final
Nunavut (Atienza)	0	1	0	1	0	0	0	X	2
Newfoundland and Labrador 1 (Locke) 🔨	1	0	2	0	3	0	2	X	8

Sheet F	1	2	3	4	5	6	7	8	Final
Quebec 2 (St-James)	2	0	0	2	0	2	1	X	7
Manitoba 1 (McPherson) 🔨	0	1	1	0	1	0	0	X	3

==== Draw 15 ====
Thursday, February 20, 4:30 pm

Sheet A	1	2	3	4	5	6	7	8	Final
Ontario 2 (Wilson) 🔨	2	0	1	4	2	0	3	X	12
Prince Edward Island (Pater)	0	2	0	0	0	1	0	X	3

Sheet B	1	2	3	4	5	6	7	8	Final
Manitoba 1 (McPherson) 🔨	0	4	0	3	0	2	1	X	10
Nova Scotia 2 (Gouthro)	2	0	3	0	1	0	0	X	6

Sheet F	1	2	3	4	5	6	7	8	Final
Quebec 1 (Morissette)	0	0	1	0	0	1	0	X	2
Saskatchewan 2 (Wood) 🔨	1	1	0	4	1	0	1	X	8

==== Draw 16 ====
Thursday, February 20, 8:30 pm

Sheet A	1	2	3	4	5	6	7	8	Final
Alberta 1 (Yurko) 🔨	1	0	0	2	0	1	2	1	7
Quebec 2 (St-James)	0	0	2	0	3	0	0	0	5

Sheet C	1	2	3	4	5	6	7	8	Final
Northern Ontario (Dubinsky)	0	0	0	0	1	0	2	0	3
British Columbia 1 (Arndt) 🔨	0	1	0	3	0	1	0	1	6

Sheet E	1	2	3	4	5	6	7	8	Final
New Brunswick (Gaines)	0	2	3	0	0	0	2	X	7
Saskatchewan 1 (Hogeboom) 🔨	1	0	0	1	1	1	0	X	4

Sheet G	1	2	3	4	5	6	7	8	Final
British Columbia 2 (Rempel) 🔨	0	2	0	3	0	1	0	1	7
Manitoba 2 (Buchalter)	0	0	2	0	1	0	2	0	5

==== Draw 17 ====
Friday, February 21, 8:30 am

Sheet D	1	2	3	4	5	6	7	8	Final
Newfoundland and Labrador 1 (Locke) 🔨	2	1	0	0	1	0	0	0	4
Northwest Territories (Wainman)	0	0	1	1	0	1	1	2	6

Sheet E	1	2	3	4	5	6	7	8	Final
Nova Scotia 1 (Blades) 🔨	1	1	0	1	0	3	0	X	6
Ontario 1 (Frlan)	0	0	1	0	2	0	1	X	4

Sheet F	1	2	3	4	5	6	7	8	Final
Newfoundland and Labrador 2 (Walsh)	0	0	0	1	0	0	1	X	2
Nova Scotia 2 (Gouthro) 🔨	2	0	1	0	5	1	0	X	9

Sheet G	1	2	3	4	5	6	7	8	Final
Prince Edward Island (Pater)	0	1	1	0	0	1	0	0	3
Saskatchewan 2 (Wood) 🔨	2	0	0	1	1	0	1	1	6

==== Draw 18 ====
Friday, February 21, 12:30 pm

Sheet C	1	2	3	4	5	6	7	8	Final
Nova Scotia 2 (Gouthro) 🔨	0	0	0	1	0	0	0	X	1
Saskatchewan 1 (Hogeboom)	0	2	1	0	1	2	2	X	8

Sheet F	1	2	3	4	5	6	7	8	Final
British Columbia 1 (Arndt) 🔨	0	1	0	2	0	1	0	1	5
Prince Edward Island (Pater)	0	0	1	0	1	0	1	0	3

Sheet G	1	2	3	4	5	6	7	8	Final
Alberta 2 (Desormeau)	0	1	0	2	0	2	0	X	5
Northern Ontario (Dubinsky) 🔨	0	0	0	0	1	0	1	X	2

=== Playoffs ===
Qualification Games
8	Quebec 2	11
9	Manitoba 2	1
7	Saskatchewan 2	4
10	Manitoba 1	6

Quarterfinals
1	Nova Scotia 1	10
8	Quebec 2	5
4	Ontario 1	10
5	New Brunswick	3
3	Alberta 1	4
6	British Columbia 1	10
2	Alberta 2	9
10	Manitoba 1	2

Semifinals
1	Nova Scotia 1	6
4	Ontario 1	4
6	British Columbia 1	2
2	Alberta 2	10

Final
1	Nova Scotia 1	8
2	Alberta 2	7

==== Qualification games ====
Friday, February 21, 4:30 pm

Sheet A	1	2	3	4	5	6	7	8	Final
Quebec 2 (St-James) 🔨	1	0	1	0	4	5	X	X	11
Manitoba 2 (Buchalter)	0	0	0	1	0	0	X	X	1

Sheet B	1	2	3	4	5	6	7	8	Final
Saskatchewan 2 (Wood) 🔨	0	2	0	1	1	0	0	0	4
Manitoba 1 (McPherson)	1	0	1	0	0	3	0	1	6

==== Quarterfinals ====
Friday, February 21, 4:30 pm

Sheet D	1	2	3	4	5	6	7	8	Final
Ontario 1 (Frlan)	2	0	0	4	0	4	X	X	10
New Brunswick (Gaines) 🔨	0	1	1	0	1	0	X	X	3

Sheet E	1	2	3	4	5	6	7	8	Final
Alberta 1 (Yurko) 🔨	0	1	0	1	0	2	0	X	4
British Columbia 1 (Arndt)	5	0	2	0	2	0	1	X	10

Friday, February 21, 8:30 pm

Sheet C	1	2	3	4	5	6	7	8	Final
Alberta 2 (Desormeau)	0	2	2	0	3	2	X	X	9
Manitoba 1 (McPherson) 🔨	1	0	0	1	0	0	X	X	2

Sheet D	1	2	3	4	5	6	7	8	Final
Nova Scotia 1 (Blades) 🔨	0	2	0	4	0	0	4	X	10
Quebec 2 (St-James)	2	0	1	0	1	1	0	X	5

==== Semifinals ====
Saturday, February 22, 12:30 pm

Sheet D	1	2	3	4	5	6	7	8	Final
British Columbia 1 (Arndt)	0	0	0	1	0	1	0	X	2
Alberta 2 (Desormeau) 🔨	1	0	0	0	2	0	7	X	10

Sheet F	1	2	3	4	5	6	7	8	Final
Nova Scotia 1 (Blades) 🔨	0	2	0	0	0	3	0	1	6
Ontario 1 (Frlan)	2	0	0	0	1	0	1	0	4

==== Final ====
Saturday, February 22, 4:00 pm

Sheet A	1	2	3	4	5	6	7	8	Final
Nova Scotia 1 (Blades) 🔨	0	2	0	3	0	3	0	0	8
Alberta 2 (Desormeau)	0	0	1	0	4	0	1	1	7

=== Consolation ===
==== A Bracket ====
For Seeds 3 to 10

Bronze medal game
4	Ontario 1	6
6	British Columbia 1	5

5th–8th
8	Quebec 2	5
5	New Brunswick	8

5th–8th
3	Alberta 1	9
10	Manitoba 1	6

9th/10th
9	Manitoba 2	3
7	Saskatchewan 2	8

==== B Bracket ====
For Seeds 11 to 21

11th/12th
11	Newfoundland and Labrador 1	4
12	Northern Ontario	6

13th/14th
13	Saskatchewan 1	6
14	Northwest Territories	9

15th/16th
15	Ontario 2	7
16	British Columbia 2	3

17th/18th
17	Nova Scotia 2	10
18	Newfoundland and Labrador 2	2

			19th/20th
			19	Quebec 1	6
20	Nunavut	1	21	Prince Edward Island	2
21	Prince Edward Island	10

=== Final standings ===
Place	Team
1st place, gold medalist(s)	Nova Scotia 1
2nd place, silver medalist(s)	Alberta 2
3rd place, bronze medalist(s)	Ontario 1
4	British Columbia 1
5	Alberta 1
6	New Brunswick
7	Quebec 2
8	Manitoba 1
9	Saskatchewan 2
10	Manitoba 2
11	Northern Ontario
12	Newfoundland and Labrador 1
13	Northwest Territories
14	Saskatchewan 1
15	Ontario 2
16	British Columbia 2
17	Nova Scotia 2
18	Newfoundland and Labrador 2
19	Quebec 1
20	Prince Edward Island
21	Nunavut
