= 2018 Canadian U18 Curling Championships – Men's tournament =

2018 Canadian U18 Curling Championships Men's tournament
- Host city: Saint Andrews, New Brunswick
- Arena: W.C. O'Neill Arena Complex & Heather Curling Club
- Dates: April 9–14
- Winner: Nova Scotia
- Curling club: Chester Curling Club, Chester
- Skip: Graeme Weagle
- Fourth: Owen Purcell
- Second: Jeffrey Meagher
- Lead: Scott Weagle
- Coach: Anthony Purcell
- Finalist: Alberta (Ryan Jacques)

The men's tournament of the 2018 Canadian U18 Curling Championships was held from April 9 to 14 at the W.C. O'Neill Arena Complex and Heather Curling Club in Saint Andrews, New Brunswick.

== Teams ==
The teams are listed as follows:

| Province | Skip | Third | Second | Lead | Alternate | Club(s) |
|---|---|---|---|---|---|---|
| Alberta | Ryan Jacques | Dustin Mikush | Gabriel Dyck | Michael Henricks | | Saville Sports Centre, Edmonton |
| British Columbia | Hayato Sato (Fourth) | Dawson Ballard (Skip) | Joshua Miki | Troy Chong | | Royal City Curling Club, New Westminster & Coquitlam Curling Club, Coquitlam |
| Manitoba | Brett Walter | Thomas Dunlop | Zachary Wasylik | Chase Dusessoy | | Elmwood Curling Club, Winnipeg |
| New Brunswick | Liam Marin | Adam Tracy | Dylan MacDonald | Josh Vaughan | | Thistle St. Andrews Curling Club, Saint John |
| Newfoundland and Labrador | Ryan McNeil Lamswood | Coleton Vriesendorp | James Trickett | Alex Phillips | | St. John's Curling Club, St. John's |
| Northern Ontario | Jacob Horgan | Maxwel Cull | Nicholas Bissonnette | Shane Robinson | | Curl Sudbury, Sudbury |
| Northwest Territories | Adam Naugler | Logan Waddell | Caleb Brake | Jullian Bowling | | Yellowknife Curling Club, Yellowknife |
| Nova Scotia | Owen Purcell (fourth) | Graeme Weagle (skip) | Jeffrey Meagher | Scott Weagle | | Chester Curling Club, Chester |
| Ontario | Joshua Leung | Scott Mitchell | Nathan Steele | Colin Schnurr | Grant Schnurr | Whitby Curling Club, Whitby |
| Prince Edward Island | Mitchell Schut | Nick Johnston | Liam Kelly | Colin MacKenzie | | Cornwall Curling Club, Cornwall |
| Quebec | Jérôme Adam | Philippe Simard | Bruno Dupras | Justin Adam | | Belvédère Curling Club, Val-d'Or; Amos Curling Club, Amos |
| Saskatchewan | Jayden Bindig | Nathen Pomedli | Braden Fleischhacker | Ethan Nygaard | | Wadena Curling Club, Wadena |

== Round-robin standings ==
Final round-robin standings

Key
| Teams to Knockout Round |

| Pool A | Skip | W | L |
|---|---|---|---|
| Manitoba | Brett Walter | 4 | 1 |
| Nova Scotia | Graeme Weagle | 3 | 2 |
| Ontario | Joshua Leung | 3 | 2 |
| Alberta | Ryan Jacques | 3 | 2 |
| Saskatchewan | Jayden Bindig | 2 | 3 |
| Northwest Territories | Adam Naugler | 0 | 5 |

| Pool B | Skip | W | L |
|---|---|---|---|
| Northern Ontario | Jacob Horgan | 5 | 0 |
| Newfoundland and Labrador | Ryan McNeil Lamswood | 4 | 1 |
| Quebec | Jérôme Adam | 3 | 2 |
| New Brunswick | Liam Marin | 2 | 3 |
| British Columbia | Dawson Ballard | 1 | 4 |
| Prince Edward Island | Mitchell Schut | 0 | 5 |

== Round-robin results ==
All draw times are listed in Atlantic Time (UTC−04:00).

=== Pool A ===
==== Draw 1 ====
Tuesday, April 9, 6:00 pm

| Sheet H | 1 | 2 | 3 | 4 | 5 | 6 | 7 | 8 | Final |
| Nova Scotia (Weagle) | 1 | 2 | 0 | 0 | 0 | 1 | 1 | 0 | 5 |
| Ontario (Leung) | 0 | 0 | 2 | 1 | 1 | 0 | 0 | 2 | 6 |

==== Draw 2 ====
Wednesday, April 10, 10:00 am

| Sheet C | 1 | 2 | 3 | 4 | 5 | 6 | 7 | 8 | Final |
| Saskatchewan (Bindig) | 0 | 0 | 0 | 0 | 0 | 1 | 0 | X | 1 |
| Alberta (Jacques) | 0 | 1 | 0 | 1 | 2 | 0 | 1 | X | 5 |

| Sheet D | 1 | 2 | 3 | 4 | 5 | 6 | 7 | 8 | Final |
| Northwest Territories (Naugler) | 0 | 1 | 0 | 0 | 0 | 1 | 0 | X | 2 |
| Manitoba (Walter) | 2 | 0 | 4 | 4 | 2 | 0 | 2 | X | 14 |

==== Draw 3 ====
Wednesday, April 10, 2:00 pm

| Sheet D | 1 | 2 | 3 | 4 | 5 | 6 | 7 | 8 | Final |
| Ontario (Leung) | 1 | 4 | 1 | 0 | 1 | 1 | X | X | 8 |
| Manitoba (Walter) | 0 | 0 | 0 | 1 | 0 | 0 | X | X | 1 |

| Sheet G | 1 | 2 | 3 | 4 | 5 | 6 | 7 | 8 | Final |
| Alberta (Jacques) | 4 | 0 | 2 | 0 | 1 | 1 | 0 | X | 8 |
| Northwest Territories (Naugler) | 0 | 1 | 0 | 1 | 0 | 0 | 1 | X | 3 |

==== Draw 4 ====
Wednesday, April 10, 6:00 pm

| Sheet G | 1 | 2 | 3 | 4 | 5 | 6 | 7 | 8 | Final |
| Saskatchewan (Bindig) | 0 | 1 | 0 | 1 | 0 | 2 | 0 | 0 | 4 |
| Nova Scotia (Weagle) | 2 | 0 | 3 | 0 | 0 | 0 | 1 | 1 | 7 |

==== Draw 6 ====
Thursday, April 11, 2:00 pm

| Sheet A | 1 | 2 | 3 | 4 | 5 | 6 | 7 | 8 | Final |
| Ontario (Leung) | 3 | 1 | 3 | 0 | 1 | 0 | X | X | 8 |
| Northwest Territories (Naugler) | 0 | 0 | 0 | 0 | 0 | 1 | X | X | 1 |

| Sheet D | 1 | 2 | 3 | 4 | 5 | 6 | 7 | 8 | Final |
| Nova Scotia (Weagle) | 1 | 0 | 0 | 0 | 1 | 0 | 2 | X | 4 |
| Alberta (Jacques) | 0 | 1 | 0 | 0 | 0 | 1 | 0 | X | 2 |

| Sheet E | 1 | 2 | 3 | 4 | 5 | 6 | 7 | 8 | Final |
| Manitoba (Walter) | 0 | 0 | 2 | 2 | 1 | 1 | 0 | X | 6 |
| Saskatchewan (Bindig) | 0 | 1 | 0 | 0 | 0 | 0 | 1 | X | 2 |

==== Draw 7 ====
Thursday, April 11, 6:00 pm

| Sheet B | 1 | 2 | 3 | 4 | 5 | 6 | 7 | 8 | Final |
| Alberta (Jacques) | 3 | 0 | 0 | 1 | 0 | 0 | 2 | X | 6 |
| Ontario (Leung) | 0 | 0 | 2 | 0 | 2 | 0 | 0 | X | 4 |

| Sheet C | 1 | 2 | 3 | 4 | 5 | 6 | 7 | 8 | Final |
| Northwest Territories (Naugler) | 0 | 0 | 0 | 0 | 0 | 0 | X | X | 0 |
| Nova Scotia (Weagle) | 0 | 1 | 1 | 3 | 2 | 3 | X | X | 10 |

==== Draw 9 ====
Friday, April 12, 2:00 pm

| Sheet A | 1 | 2 | 3 | 4 | 5 | 6 | 7 | 8 | Final |
| Northwest Territories (Naugler) | 0 | 0 | 0 | 0 | 1 | 0 | 0 | X | 1 |
| Saskatchewan (Bindig) | 0 | 3 | 2 | 1 | 0 | 0 | 1 | X | 7 |

| Sheet F | 1 | 2 | 3 | 4 | 5 | 6 | 7 | 8 | Final |
| Manitoba (Walter) | 1 | 2 | 0 | 2 | 0 | 1 | 0 | X | 6 |
| Alberta (Jacques) | 0 | 0 | 1 | 0 | 0 | 0 | 2 | X | 3 |

==== Draw 10 ====
Friday, April 12, 6:00 pm

| Sheet C | 1 | 2 | 3 | 4 | 5 | 6 | 7 | 8 | Final |
| Manitoba (Walter) | 0 | 2 | 0 | 3 | 1 | 0 | 0 | 1 | 7 |
| Nova Scotia (Weagle) | 1 | 0 | 2 | 0 | 0 | 1 | 0 | 0 | 4 |

| Sheet H | 1 | 2 | 3 | 4 | 5 | 6 | 7 | 8 | Final |
| Saskatchewan (Bindig) | 0 | 1 | 1 | 0 | 0 | 3 | 0 | X | 5 |
| Ontario (Leung) | 1 | 0 | 0 | 1 | 1 | 0 | 1 | X | 4 |

=== Pool B ===
==== Draw 1 ====
Tuesday, April 9, 6:00 pm

| Sheet H | 1 | 2 | 3 | 4 | 5 | 6 | 7 | 8 | Final |
| Newfoundland and Labrador (McNeil Lamswood) | 0 | 0 | 0 | 0 | 3 | 1 | 0 | 0 | 4 |
| Northern Ontario (Horgan) | 1 | 1 | 0 | 0 | 0 | 0 | 2 | 1 | 5 |

==== Draw 2 ====
Wednesday, April 10, 10:00 am

| Sheet C | 1 | 2 | 3 | 4 | 5 | 6 | 7 | 8 | Final |
| Quebec (Adam) | 0 | 2 | 0 | 2 | 1 | 0 | 1 | X | 6 |
| Prince Edward Island (Schut) | 1 | 0 | 1 | 0 | 0 | 0 | 0 | X | 2 |

| Sheet D | 1 | 2 | 3 | 4 | 5 | 6 | 7 | 8 | Final |
| British Columbia (Ballard) | 0 | 0 | 0 | 0 | 1 | 0 | 1 | X | 2 |
| New Brunswick (Marin) | 0 | 1 | 0 | 2 | 0 | 2 | 0 | X | 5 |

==== Draw 3 ====
Wednesday, April 10, 2:00 pm

| Sheet C | 1 | 2 | 3 | 4 | 5 | 6 | 7 | 8 | Final |
| New Brunswick (Marin) | 0 | 0 | 0 | 1 | 1 | 0 | 0 | 0 | 2 |
| Newfoundland and Labrador (McNeil Lamswood) | 0 | 0 | 1 | 0 | 0 | 0 | 0 | 2 | 3 |

==== Draw 4 ====
Wednesday, April 10, 6:00 pm

| Sheet D | 1 | 2 | 3 | 4 | 5 | 6 | 7 | 8 | Final |
| Prince Edward Island (Schut) | 0 | 3 | 0 | 0 | 1 | 0 | 0 | X | 4 |
| Northern Ontario (Horgan) | 1 | 0 | 2 | 0 | 0 | 3 | 1 | X | 7 |

| Sheet F | 1 | 2 | 3 | 4 | 5 | 6 | 7 | 8 | Final |
| British Columbia (Ballard) | 0 | 1 | 0 | 0 | 1 | 1 | 0 | 1 | 4 |
| Quebec (Adam) | 2 | 0 | 2 | 1 | 0 | 0 | 1 | 0 | 6 |

==== Draw 5 ====
Thursday, April 11, 10:00 am

| Sheet E | 1 | 2 | 3 | 4 | 5 | 6 | 7 | 8 | Final |
| Northern Ontario (Horgan) | 1 | 3 | 1 | 0 | 1 | 0 | 0 | X | 6 |
| Quebec (Adam) | 0 | 0 | 0 | 1 | 0 | 0 | 1 | X | 2 |

==== Draw 6 ====
Thursday, April 11, 2:00 pm

| Sheet G | 1 | 2 | 3 | 4 | 5 | 6 | 7 | 8 | Final |
| Newfoundland and Labrador (McNeil Lamswood) | 0 | 2 | 2 | 0 | 1 | 0 | 0 | 2 | 7 |
| British Columbia (Ballard) | 0 | 0 | 0 | 2 | 0 | 1 | 1 | 0 | 4 |

| Sheet H | 1 | 2 | 3 | 4 | 5 | 6 | 7 | 8 | 9 | Final |
| New Brunswick (Marin) | 0 | 1 | 0 | 0 | 0 | 2 | 2 | 0 | 1 | 6 |
| Prince Edward Island (Schut) | 1 | 0 | 1 | 1 | 1 | 0 | 0 | 1 | 0 | 5 |

==== Draw 7 ====
Thursday, April 11, 6:00 pm

| Sheet A | 1 | 2 | 3 | 4 | 5 | 6 | 7 | 8 | Final |
| Northern Ontario (Horgan) | 2 | 0 | 0 | 2 | 0 | 2 | 2 | X | 8 |
| New Brunswick (Marin) | 0 | 2 | 0 | 0 | 1 | 0 | 0 | X | 3 |

| Sheet E | 1 | 2 | 3 | 4 | 5 | 6 | 7 | 8 | Final |
| Prince Edward Island (Schut) | 0 | 0 | 0 | 0 | 1 | 0 | 0 | 0 | 1 |
| Newfoundland and Labrador (McNeil Lamswood) | 0 | 0 | 1 | 1 | 0 | 1 | 0 | 1 | 4 |

==== Draw 8 ====
Friday, April 12, 10:00 am

| Sheet A | 1 | 2 | 3 | 4 | 5 | 6 | 7 | 8 | Final |
| British Columbia (Ballard) | 0 | 1 | 2 | 1 | 0 | 0 | 1 | X | 5 |
| Prince Edward Island (Schut) | 0 | 0 | 0 | 0 | 1 | 1 | 0 | X | 2 |

==== Draw 9 ====
Friday, April 12, 2:00 pm

| Sheet B | 1 | 2 | 3 | 4 | 5 | 6 | 7 | 8 | Final |
| Quebec (Adam) | 0 | 0 | 0 | 2 | 0 | 0 | 0 | X | 2 |
| Newfoundland and Labrador (McNeil Lamswood) | 0 | 0 | 0 | 0 | 3 | 2 | 1 | X | 6 |

| Sheet C | 1 | 2 | 3 | 4 | 5 | 6 | 7 | 8 | Final |
| Northern Ontario (Horgan) | 1 | 0 | 3 | 0 | 5 | 0 | 2 | X | 11 |
| British Columbia (Ballard) | 0 | 1 | 0 | 2 | 0 | 2 | 0 | X | 5 |

==== Draw 10 ====
Friday, April 12, 6:00 pm

| Sheet G | 1 | 2 | 3 | 4 | 5 | 6 | 7 | 8 | Final |
| Quebec (Adam) | 1 | 0 | 1 | 0 | 1 | 2 | 1 | X | 6 |
| New Brunswick (Marin) | 0 | 1 | 0 | 1 | 0 | 0 | 0 | X | 2 |

== Knockout round ==
=== A Bracket ===
Qualifier 1
A1 | Manitoba | 7
B4 | New Brunswick | 2
A1 | Manitoba | 6
A2 | Nova Scotia | 7
A2 | Nova Scotia | 8
B3 | Quebec | 2

Qualifier 2
B2 | Newfoundland and Labrador | 3
A3 | Ontario | 2
B2 | Newfoundland and Labrador | 4
A4 | Alberta | 7
B1 | Northern Ontario | 4
A4 | Alberta | 6

==== A Semifinals ====
Saturday, April 13, 9:00 am

| Sheet B | 1 | 2 | 3 | 4 | 5 | 6 | 7 | 8 | Final |
| Manitoba (Walters) | 0 | 2 | 2 | 1 | 0 | 2 | X | X | 7 |
| New Brunswick (Marin) | 0 | 0 | 0 | 0 | 2 | 0 | X | X | 2 |

| Sheet C | 1 | 2 | 3 | 4 | 5 | 6 | 7 | 8 | Final |
| Nova Scotia (Weagle) | 0 | 5 | 1 | 0 | 2 | 0 | X | X | 8 |
| Quebec (Adam) | 0 | 0 | 0 | 1 | 0 | 1 | X | X | 2 |

| Sheet D | 1 | 2 | 3 | 4 | 5 | 6 | 7 | 8 | Final |
| Newfoundland and Labrador (McNeil Lamswood) | 0 | 0 | 0 | 0 | 0 | 1 | 0 | 2 | 3 |
| Ontario (Leung) | 0 | 0 | 0 | 0 | 0 | 0 | 2 | 0 | 2 |

| Sheet E | 1 | 2 | 3 | 4 | 5 | 6 | 7 | 8 | Final |
| Northern Ontario (Horgan) | 0 | 2 | 0 | 1 | 0 | 0 | 1 | 0 | 4 |
| Alberta (Jacques) | 1 | 0 | 0 | 0 | 0 | 3 | 0 | 2 | 6 |

==== A Finals ====
Saturday, April 13, 4:00 pm

| Sheet C | 1 | 2 | 3 | 4 | 5 | 6 | 7 | 8 | Final |
| Newfoundland and Labrador (McNeil Lamswood) | 1 | 0 | 1 | 0 | 1 | 0 | 1 | X | 4 |
| Alberta (Jacques) | 0 | 2 | 0 | 3 | 0 | 2 | 0 | X | 7 |

| Sheet D | 1 | 2 | 3 | 4 | 5 | 6 | 7 | 8 | 9 | Final |
| Manitoba (Walters) | 1 | 0 | 1 | 0 | 2 | 0 | 0 | 2 | 0 | 6 |
| Nova Scotia (Weagle) | 0 | 1 | 0 | 2 | 0 | 3 | 0 | 0 | 1 | 7 |

=== B Bracket ===
| Semifinals | | | Qualifier 3 |
| | | | A1 | Manitoba | 5 |
| A3 | Ontario | 2 | B1 | Northern Ontario | 6 |
| B1 | Northern Ontario | 4 |

| | | | Qualifier 4 |
| | | | B2 | Newfoundland and Labrador | 4 |
| B4 | New Brunswick | 6 | B4 | New Brunswick | 2 |
| B3 | Quebec | 0 |

==== B Semifinals ====
Saturday, April 13, 4:00 pm

| Sheet B | 1 | 2 | 3 | 4 | 5 | 6 | 7 | 8 | Final |
| Ontario (Leung) | 0 | 0 | 0 | 0 | 0 | 2 | 0 | X | 2 |
| Northern Ontario (Horgan) | 0 | 0 | 0 | 2 | 0 | 0 | 2 | X | 4 |

| Sheet E | 1 | 2 | 3 | 4 | 5 | 6 | 7 | 8 | Final |
| New Brunswick (Marin) | 1 | 1 | 2 | 1 | 1 | X | X | X | 6 |
| Quebec (Adam) | 0 | 0 | 0 | 0 | 0 | X | X | X | 0 |

==== B Finals ====
Sunday, April 14, 9:00 am

| Sheet D | 1 | 2 | 3 | 4 | 5 | 6 | 7 | 8 | Final |
| Newfoundland and Labrador (McNeil Lamswood) | 1 | 0 | 0 | 0 | 0 | 0 | 3 | X | 4 |
| New Brunswick (Marin) | 0 | 0 | 1 | 0 | 0 | 1 | 0 | X | 2 |

| Sheet E | 1 | 2 | 3 | 4 | 5 | 6 | 7 | 8 | 9 | Final |
| Manitoba (Walters) | 1 | 0 | 2 | 0 | 1 | 0 | 0 | 1 | 0 | 5 |
| Northern Ontario (Horgan) | 0 | 2 | 0 | 2 | 0 | 0 | 1 | 0 | 1 | 6 |

=== Playoffs ===
Semifinals
1 | Nova Scotia | 6
4 | Newfoundland and Labrador | 2
2 | Alberta | 5
3 | Northern Ontario | 2

Final
1 | Nova Scotia | 10
2 | Alberta | 6

| Bronze medal game |
| 3 | Northern Ontario | 4 |
| 4 | Newfoundland and Labrador | 1 |

=== Semifinals ===
Sunday, April 14, 1:30 pm

| Sheet D | 1 | 2 | 3 | 4 | 5 | 6 | 7 | 8 | Final |
| Alberta (Jacques) | 1 | 0 | 2 | 0 | 2 | 0 | 0 | X | 5 |
| Northern Ontario (Horgan) | 0 | 2 | 0 | 0 | 0 | 0 | 0 | X | 2 |

Player percentages
| Alberta | | Northern Ontario | |
|---|---|---|---|
| Mike Henricks | 82% | Shane Robinson | 77% |
| Gabriel Dyck | 83% | Nick Bissonnette | 77% |
| Dustin Mikush | 86% | Max Cull | 78% |
| Ryan Jacques | 87% | Jacob Horgan | 90% |
| Total | 84% | Total | 80% |

| Sheet E | 1 | 2 | 3 | 4 | 5 | 6 | 7 | 8 | Final |
| Nova Scotia (Weagle) | 1 | 0 | 2 | 0 | 0 | 2 | 1 | X | 6 |
| Newfoundland and Labrador (McNeil Lamswood) | 0 | 1 | 0 | 0 | 1 | 0 | 0 | X | 2 |

Player percentages
| Nova Scotia | | Newfoundland and Labrador | |
|---|---|---|---|
| Scott Weagle | 79% | Alex Phillips | 89% |
| Jeffrey Meagher | 72% | James Trickett | 84% |
| Graeme Weagle | 83% | Coleton Vriesendorp | 80% |
| Owen Purcell | 93% | Ryan McNeil Lamswood | 71% |
| Total | 81% | Total | 82% |

=== Bronze medal game ===
Sunday, April 14, 6:00 pm

| Sheet B | 1 | 2 | 3 | 4 | 5 | 6 | 7 | 8 | Final |
| Northern Ontario (Horgan) | 0 | 1 | 0 | 0 | 0 | 2 | 0 | 1 | 4 |
| Newfoundland and Labrador (McNeil Lamswood) | 0 | 0 | 0 | 0 | 1 | 0 | 0 | 0 | 1 |

Player percentages
| Northern Ontario | | Newfoundland and Labrador | |
|---|---|---|---|
| Shane Robinson | 86% | Alex Phillips | 92% |
| Nick Bissonnette | 83% | James Trickett | 77% |
| Max Cull | 64% | Coleton Vriesendorp | 66% |
| Jacob Horgan | 86% | Ryan McNeil Lamswood | 73% |
| Total | 80% | Total | 77% |

=== Final ===
Sunday, April 14, 6:00 pm

| Sheet C | 1 | 2 | 3 | 4 | 5 | 6 | 7 | 8 | Final |
| Nova Scotia (Weagle) | 2 | 0 | 5 | 3 | 0 | 0 | 0 | X | 10 |
| Alberta (Jacques) | 0 | 1 | 0 | 0 | 2 | 2 | 1 | X | 6 |

Player percentages
| Nova Scotia | | Alberta | |
|---|---|---|---|
| Scott Weagle | 89% | Mike Henricks | 97% |
| Jeffrey Meagher | 89% | Gabriel Dyck | 94% |
| Graeme Weagle | 91% | Dustin Mikush | 78% |
| Owen Purcell | 68% | Ryan Jacques | 75% |
| Total | 84% | Total | 86% |
