= 2019 Canadian U18 Curling Championships =

- Host city: Sherwood Park, Alberta
- Arena: Glen Allan Recreation Complex & Sherwood Park Curling Club
- Dates: April 2–7
- Men's winner: Ontario
- Curling club: Coldwater & District CC, Coldwater
- Skip: Dylan Niepage
- Third: Sam Hastings
- Second: Cameron Vanbodegom
- Lead: Treyton Cowell
- Alternate: Christopher Inglis
- Coach: Jeff Vanbodegom
- Finalist: British Columbia (Colwell)
- Women's winner: Northern Ontario
- Curling club: Idylwylde G&CC, Sudbury
- Skip: Bella Croisier
- Third: Jamie Smith
- Second: Piper Croisier
- Lead: Lauren Rajala
- Coach: Shawn Croisier
- Finalist: Ontario (Deschenes)

The 2019 Canadian U18 Curling Championships were held from April 2 to 7 at the Glen Allan Recreation Complex and the Sherwood Park Curling Club in Sherwood Park, Alberta.

== Men ==
=== Round-robin standings ===
Final round-robin standings

Key
Teams to Knockout Round

Pool A	Skip	W	L
British Columbia	Erik Colwell	5	1
Manitoba	Jordon McDonald	5	1
Ontario	Dylan Niepage	4	2
Nova Scotia 2 (Note: Nunavut and Yukon did not send men's teams to the tournament. Their spots were filled by an Alberta host team and a second Nova Scotia team.)	Ethan Young	3	3
Quebec	Raphaël Patry	2	4
Northern Ontario	Malcolm O'Bright	2	4
Northwest Territories	Adam Naugler	0	6

Pool B	Skip	W	L
Alberta	Nathan Molberg	5	1
New Brunswick	Josh Nowlan	4	2
Nova Scotia	Adam McEachren	4	2
Saskatchewan	Jayden Bindig	3	3
Alberta (Host)	Cortland Sonnenberg	2	4
Prince Edward Island	Mitchell Schut	2	4
Newfoundland and Labrador	Joel Krats	1	5

=== Knockout round ===
==== A Bracket ====
Qualifier 1
A1	British Columbia	7
B4	Saskatchewan	3
A1	British Columbia	6
A2	Manitoba	7
A2	Manitoba	9
B3	Nova Scotia	4

Qualifier 2
B2	New Brunswick	6
A3	Ontario	9
A3	Ontario	5
B1	Alberta	4
B1	Alberta	6
A4	Nova Scotia 2	4

==== B Bracket ====
			Qualifier 3
			B1	Alberta	3
B4	Saskatchewan	6	B3	Nova Scotia	5
B3	Nova Scotia	7

			Qualifier 4
			A1	British Columbia	6
B2	New Brunswick	9	B2	New Brunswick	4
A4	Nova Scotia 2	4

=== Playoffs ===
Semifinals
A2	Manitoba	2
A3	Ontario	12
B2	British Columbia	8
B3	Nova Scotia	5

Final
A3	Ontario	6
B2	British Columbia	5

Bronze medal game
A2	Manitoba	4
B3	Nova Scotia	2

==== Semifinals ====
Sunday, April 7, 9:00am

Sheet A	1	2	3	4	5	6	7	8	Final
Manitoba (McDonald) 🔨	0	2	0	0	0	0	X	X	2
Ontario (Niepage)	1	0	2	2	2	5	X	X	12

Sheet B	1	2	3	4	5	6	7	8	Final
British Columbia (Colwell) 🔨	2	1	0	1	0	3	0	1	8
Nova Scotia (McEachren)	0	0	2	0	1	0	2	0	5

==== Bronze medal game ====
Sunday, April 7, 1:00pm

Sheet D	1	2	3	4	5	6	7	8	Final
Manitoba (McDonald) 🔨	1	0	1	1	0	0	1	X	4
Nova Scotia (McEachren)	0	2	0	0	0	0	0	X	2

==== Final ====
Sunday, April 7, 1:00pm

Sheet C	1	2	3	4	5	6	7	8	Final
Ontario (Niepage)	0	2	2	1	0	1	0	0	6
British Columbia (Colwell) 🔨	2	0	0	0	1	0	1	1	5

== Women ==
=== Round-robin standings ===
Final round-robin standings

Key
Teams to Knockout Round

Pool A	Skip	W	L
Northern Ontario	Bella Croisier	5	1
Saskatchewan	Emily Haupstein	4	2
Alberta (Host) (Note: Nunavut did not send a women's team to the tournament. Their spot was filled by an Alberta host team.)	Julia Bakos	4	2
Ontario	Emily Deschenes	3	3
Prince Edward Island	Lauren Ferguson	3	3
Nova Scotia	Cally Moore	2	4
Yukon	Katarina Anderson	0	6

Pool B	Skip	W	L
Alberta	Jessica Wytrychowski	5	1
Manitoba	Emma Jensen	4	2
New Brunswick	Melodie Forsythe	3	3
British Columbia	Kaila Buchy	3	3
Quebec	Cynthia St-Georges	3	3
Newfoundland and Labrador	Katie Follett	2	4
Northwest Territories	Cassie Rogers	1	5

=== Knockout round ===
==== A Bracket ====
Qualifier 1
A1	Northern Ontario	7
B4	British Columbia	4
A1	Northern Ontario	7
B3	New Brunswick	4
A2	Saskatchewan	5
B3	New Brunswick	7

Qualifier 2
B2	Manitoba	4
A3	Alberta (Host)	7
A3	Alberta (Host)	5
A4	Ontario	6
B1	Alberta	4
A4	Ontario	6

==== B Bracket ====
			Qualifier 3
			A3	Alberta (Host)	4
B4	British Columbia	7	B4	British Columbia	5
A2	Saskatchewan	6

			Qualifier 4
			B3	New Brunswick	8
B2	Manitoba	5	B2	Manitoba	6
B1	Alberta	4

=== Playoffs ===
Semifinals
B3	New Brunswick	4
A1	Northern Ontario	7
B4	British Columbia	2
A4	Ontario	6

Final
A1	Northern Ontario	6
A4	Ontario	2

Bronze medal game
B3	New Brunswick	1
B4	British Columbia	8

==== Semifinals ====
Sunday, April 7, 9:00am

Sheet C	1	2	3	4	5	6	7	8	Final
New Brunswick (Forsythe)	0	2	0	0	0	2	0	0	4
Northern Ontario (Croisier) 🔨	1	0	0	2	0	0	2	2	7

Sheet D	1	2	3	4	5	6	7	8	Final
British Columbia (Buchy)	0	0	1	0	1	0	0	0	2
Ontario (Deschenes) 🔨	1	1	0	1	0	0	1	2	6

==== Bronze medal game ====
Sunday, April 7, 1:00pm

Sheet D	1	2	3	4	5	6	7	8	Final
New Brunswick (Forsythe)	0	1	0	0	0	0	X	X	1
British Columbia (Buchy) 🔨	2	0	2	0	3	1	X	X	8

==== Final ====
Sunday, April 7, 1:00pm

Sheet C	1	2	3	4	5	6	7	8	Final
Northern Ontario (Croisier) 🔨	0	1	0	1	2	2	0	X	6
Ontario (Deschenes)	0	0	1	0	0	0	1	X	2
