= Canadian U18 Curling Championships =

Annual curling tournament in Canada

- Established: 2017
- 2026 host city: Timmins, Ontario
- 2026 arena: McIntyre Curling Club

Current champions (2026)
- Men: Quebec 1
- Women: Saskatchewan

Current edition
- 2026 Canadian U18 Curling Championships

The Canadian U18 Curling Championships is an annual curling tournament held to determine the best juvenile-level curling team in Canada. Juvenile level curlers must be under the age of 18 as of June 30 in the year prior to the tournament.

The 2017 Canadian U18 Curling Championships was the inaugural championship for both the men's and women's sides. The event is a continuation of the Optimist U18 International Curling Championships. The U18 Internationals consisted of teams from Canada, USA, and Japan, and ran from 2001 to 2016 on both the men's and women's sides.

== Champions ==
=== Boys ===
| Tournament | Gold | | Silver | | Bronze | | Host |
| Tournament | Locale | Team | Locale | Team | Locale | Team | Host |
|---|---|---|---|---|---|---|---|
| 2017 | Northern Ontario | Jacob Horgan; Max Cull; Nicholas Bissonnette; Shane Robinson | Nova Scotia | Ryan Abraham; Mitchell Cortello; Jake Flemming; Thomas Mosher | British Columbia | Tyler Tardi; Sterling Middleton; Scott Gray; Derek Chandler | Moncton, New Brunswick |
| 2018 | Nova Scotia | Graeme Weagle; Owen Purcell; Jeffrey Meagher; Scott Weagle | Alberta | Ryan Jacques; Dustin Mikush; Gabriel Dyck; Michael Henricks | Northern Ontario | Jacob Horgan; Max Cull; Nicholas Bissonnette; Shane Robinson | Saint Andrews, New Brunswick |
| 2019 | Ontario | Dylan Niepage; Sam Hastings; Cameron Vanbodegom; Treyton Cowell; Christopher Inglis | British Columbia | Erik Colwell; Mitchell Kopytko; Benjamin Morin; Tyler Powell | Manitoba | Jordon McDonald; Jaedon Neuert; Braxton Kuntz; Alexandre Fontaine | Sherwood Park, Alberta |
| 2020 | Cancelled due to the COVID-19 pandemic in Canada | | | | | | |
| 2021 | Cancelled due to the COVID-19 pandemic in Canada | | | | | | |
| 2022 | Saskatchewan 1 | Matthew Drewitz; Michael Hom; Carter Parenteau; Jared Tessier | Nova Scotia 2 | Nick Mosher; Sean Beland; Evan Hennigar; Aidan MacDonald; Owen McPherson | Ontario 1 | Kyle Stratton; Liam Tardif; Matthew Pouget; Brayden Appleby; Kibo Mulima | Oakville, Ontario |
| 2023 | Alberta 2 | Zachary Davies; Benjamin Kiist; Terren Algot; Lucas Sawiak; Logan Thomas | Nova Scotia 1 | Nick Mosher; Evan Hennigar; Owen McPherson; Aidan MacDonald | Nova Scotia 2 | Calan MacIsaac; Nathan Gray; Owain Fisher; Christopher McCurdy | Timmins, Ontario |
| 2024 | Newfoundland and Labrador 1 | Simon Perry; Nicholas Codner; Brayden Snow; Carter Holden | Saskatchewan 1 | Dylan Derksen; Logan Sawicki; Tyler Derksen; Gavin Martens | Nova Scotia 1 | Zach Atherton; Alan Fawcett; Tyler McMullen; Brennan Smith | Ottawa, Ontario |
| 2025 | Nova Scotia 1 | Zach Atherton; Alan Fawcett; Tyler McMullen; Jed Freeman | Ontario | Tyler MacTavish; Liam Rowe; Alec Symeonides; Connor Elkins; Nathan Thomas | Quebec 2 | Zachary Janidlo; Owen Paterson; Nicolas Janidlo; Coby Olszewski; Cole Richard | Saskatoon, Saskatchewan |
| 2026 | Quebec 1 | Raphaël Tremblay; Louis-François Brassard; Nathan Beaudoin-Gendron; Olivier St-Pierre | Ontario 2 | Aaron Genjaga; Aidan Campbell; Theo Barbosa; Jonathan Blais; Justin Anderson | Ontario 1 | Tyler MacTavish; Aaron Benning; Alec Symeonides; Liam Rowe; Owen MacTavish | Timmins, Ontario |

=== Girls ===
| Tournament | Gold | | Silver | | Bronze | | Host |
| Tournament | Locale | Team | Locale | Team | Locale | Team | Host |
|---|---|---|---|---|---|---|---|
| 2017 | Northern Ontario | Kira Brunton; Kate Sherry; Sydnie Stinson; Jessica Leonard | New Brunswick | Justine Comeau; Emma LeBlanc; Brigitte Comeau; Keira McLaughlin | Quebec | Gabrielle Lavoie; Patricia Boudreault; Anna Munroe; Julie Daigle | Moncton, New Brunswick |
| 2018 | Nova Scotia | Isabelle Ladouceur; Emilie Proulx; Kate Callaghan; Makayla Harnish; Elsa Nauss | Saskatchewan | Skylar Ackerman; Madison Johnston; Chantel Hoag; Samantha McLaren | Alberta | Ryleigh Bakker; Hannah Phillips; Rhiley Quinn; Hannah Airey; Elysa Crough | Saint Andrews, New Brunswick |
| 2019 | Northern Ontario | Bella Croisier; Jamie Smith; Piper Croisier; Lauren Rajala | Ontario | Emily Deschenes; Emma Artichuk; Jillian Uniacke; Celeste Gauthier; Grace Cave | British Columbia | Kaila Buchy; Katelyn McGillivray; Hannah Lindner; Arissa Toffolo | Sherwood Park, Alberta |
| 2020 | Cancelled due to the COVID-19 pandemic in Canada | | | | | | |
| 2021 | Cancelled due to the COVID-19 pandemic in Canada | | | | | | |
| 2022 | Alberta 1 | Myla Plett; Rachel Jacques; Alyssa Nedohin; Lauren Miller; Chloe Fediuk | Alberta 2 | Claire Booth; Kaylee Raniseth; Raelyn Helston; Kate Ector; Chloe Johnston | British Columbia 1 | Gracelyn Richards; Keelie Duncan; Grace McCusker; Carley Hardie | Oakville, Ontario |
| 2023 | Alberta 1 | Myla Plett; Alyssa Nedohin; Chloe Fediuk; Allie Iskiw | New Brunswick 2 | Mélodie Forsythe; Rebecca Watson; Izzy Paterson; Caylee Smith | Nova Scotia 2 | Sophie Blades; Kate Weissent; Stephanie Atherton; Alexis Cluney | Timmins, Ontario |
| 2024 | Manitoba | Shaela Hayward; Keira Krahn; India Young; Rylie Cox | Quebec 1 | Jolianne Fortin; Emy Lafrance; Megan Lafrance; Mégane Fortin | Ontario 2 | Ava Acres; Aila Thompson; Isabella McLean; Mya Sharpe | Ottawa, Ontario |
| 2025 | Nova Scotia 1 | Cassidy Blades; Stephanie Atherton; Anna MacNutt; Lily Mitchell | Alberta 2 | Abby Desormeau; Julia Kennedy; Molly Whitbread; Savannah Dutka; Camryn Adams | Ontario 1 | Katrina Frlan; Erika Wainwright; Samantha Wall; Lauren Norman | Saskatoon, Saskatchewan |
| 2026 | Saskatchewan | Renée Wood; Edie Jardine; Amelia Whiting; Winnie Morin; Abby Hogeboom | Ontario 1 | Charlotte Wilson; Amelia Benning; Abby Rushton; Sydney Anderson; Olivia Moore | Manitoba 2 | Caitlyn McPherson; Julie Magnusson; Jorja Buhr; Anais McCormick | Timmins, Ontario |

== All-time medals ==
As of 2026 Championship

=== Boys ===
| Rank | Team | Gold | Silver | Bronze | Total |
|---|---|---|---|---|---|
| 1 | Nova Scotia | 2 | 3 | 2 | 7 |
| 2 | Ontario | 1 | 2 | 2 | 5 |
| 3 | Alberta | 1 | 1 | 0 | 2 |
| 3 | Saskatchewan | 1 | 1 | 0 | 2 |
| 5 | Northern Ontario | 1 | 0 | 1 | 2 |
| 5 | Quebec | 1 | 0 | 1 | 2 |
| 7 | Newfoundland and Labrador | 1 | 0 | 0 | 1 |
| 8 | British Columbia | 0 | 1 | 1 | 2 |
| 9 | Manitoba | 0 | 0 | 1 | 1 |

=== Girls ===
| Rank | Team | Gold | Silver | Bronze | Total |
|---|---|---|---|---|---|
| 1 | Alberta | 2 | 2 | 1 | 5 |
| 2 | Nova Scotia | 2 | 0 | 1 | 3 |
| 3 | Northern Ontario | 2 | 0 | 0 | 2 |
| 4 | Saskatchewan | 1 | 1 | 0 | 2 |
| 5 | Manitoba | 1 | 0 | 1 | 2 |
| 6 | Ontario | 0 | 2 | 2 | 4 |
| 7 | New Brunswick | 0 | 2 | 0 | 2 |
| 8 | Quebec | 0 | 1 | 1 | 2 |
| 9 | British Columbia | 0 | 0 | 2 | 2 |

== Provincial and territorial playdowns ==
- U18 New Brunswick Curling Championships
- U18 Ontario Curling Championships
