= 2025 Canadian Under-21 World Mixed Doubles Qualifier =

Curling tournament

- Host city: Summerside, Prince Edward Island
- Arena: Consolidated Credit Union Place & Silver Fox Entertainment Complex
- Dates: March 16–20
- Winner: (Ontario) (Newfoundland and Labrador) Vivier / Codner
- Curling club: Navan CC, Ottawa & St. John's CC, St. John's
- Female: Dominique Vivier
- Male: Nicholas Codner
- Finalist: (New Brunswick) Tracy / Riggs

The 2025 Canadian Under-21 World Mixed Doubles Qualifier was held from March 16 to 20 at the Consolidated Credit Union Place and the Silver Fox Entertainment Complex in Summerside, Prince Edward Island. The winning pair of Dominique Vivier and Nicholas Codner represented Canada at the 2025 World Junior Mixed Doubles Curling Championship in Edmonton, Alberta. The event was held in conjunction with the 2025 Canadian Mixed Doubles Curling Championship.

== Qualification process ==
Means of Qualification	Vacancies	Qualified
East Qualifier	4	(New Brunswick) Tracy / Riggs (Nova Scotia) Fisher / Fisher (Newfoundland and Labrador) Neary / Hancock (Ontario) (Newfoundland and Labrador) Vivier / Codner
West Qualifier	4	(Manitoba) Hollins / Huminicki (Alberta) Duncan / Keenan (Alberta) Ector / Jacques (Alberta) Ryhorchuk / Peterson
TOTAL	8	

== Teams ==
The teams are listed as follows:

Female	Male	Province(s)	Club(s)
Keelie Duncan	Michael Keenan	Alberta	The Glencoe Club, Calgary
Kate Ector	Justice Jacques	Alberta	North Hill CC, Calgary & Leduc CC, Leduc
Cerys Fisher	Owain Fisher	Nova Scotia	Truro CC, Truro
Madelyn Hollins	Elias Huminicki	Manitoba	Assiniboine Memorial CC, Winnipeg
Emily Neary	Dylan Hancock	Newfoundland and Labrador	St. John's CC, St. John's
Sophia Ryhorchuk	Ronan Peterson	Alberta	Saville Community SC, Edmonton
Sierra Tracy	Noah Riggs	New Brunswick	Gage G&CC, Oromocto
Dominique Vivier	Nicholas Codner	Ontario; Newfoundland and Labrador	Navan CC, Ottawa & St. John's CC, St. John's

== Round robin standings ==
Final Round Robin Standings

Key
Teams to Playoffs

Team	W	L	W–L	PF	PA	EW	EL	BE	SE	LSD
(New Brunswick) Tracy / Riggs	7	0	–	53	24	33	17	0	17	606.5
(Manitoba) Hollins / Huminicki	5	2	–	47	41	24	28	0	6	474.1
(Ontario) (Newfoundland and Labrador) Vivier / Codner	4	3	–	50	44	27	23	0	11	968.8
(Nova Scotia) Fisher / Fisher	3	4	1–1	37	40	29	23	0	9	474.9
(Newfoundland and Labrador) Neary / Hancock	3	4	1–1	40	46	24	30	0	2	521.2
(Alberta) Ector / Jacques	3	4	1–1	42	39	26	29	0	9	670.1
(Alberta) Duncan / Keenan	2	5	–	35	50	25	27	0	10	582.3
(Alberta) Ryhorchuk / Peterson	1	6	–	30	50	19	30	0	2	538.9

Round Robin Summary Table
Pos.	Team	(Alberta) D/K	(Alberta) E/J	(Nova Scotia) F/F	(Manitoba) H/H	(Newfoundland and Labrador) N/H	(Alberta) R/P	(New Brunswick) T/R	(Ontario) (Newfoundland and Labrador) V/C	Record
7	(Alberta) Duncan / Keenan	—	7–5	6–2	6–8	7–9	3–10	3–7	3–9	2–5
6	(Alberta) Ector / Jacques	5–7	—	3–5	8–5	9–4	7–3	6–7	4–8	3–4
4	(Nova Scotia) Fisher / Fisher	2–6	5–3	—	5–7	4–7	8–6	3–8	10–3	3–4
2	(Manitoba) Hollins / Huminicki	8–6	5–8	7–5	—	7–6	8–2	2–7	10–7	5–2
5	(Newfoundland and Labrador) Neary / Hancock	9–7	4–9	7–4	6–7	—	7–3	3–6	4–10	3–4
8	(Alberta) Ryhorchuk / Peterson	10–3	3–7	6–8	2–8	3–7	—	2–9	4–8	1–6
1	(New Brunswick) Tracy / Riggs	7–3	7–6	8–3	7–2	6–3	9–2	—	9–5	7–0
3	(Ontario) (Newfoundland and Labrador) Vivier / Codner	9–3	8–4	3–10	7–10	10–4	8–4	5–9	—	4–3

== Round robin results ==
All draws are listed in Atlantic Time (UTC−03:00).

=== Draw 1 ===
Sunday, March 16, 6:00 pm

Sheet E	1	2	3	4	5	6	7	8	Final
(Alberta) Duncan / Keenan	0	2	0	0	0	1	0	X	3
(Alberta) Ryhorchuk / Peterson 🔨	2	0	1	2	2	0	3	X	10

Sheet J	1	2	3	4	5	6	7	8	Final
(Alberta) Ector / Jacques 🔨	3	0	0	1	1	0	1	2	8
(Manitoba) Hollins / Huminicki	0	2	1	0	0	2	0	0	5

=== Draw 2 ===
Sunday, March 16, 9:00 pm

Sheet E	1	2	3	4	5	6	7	8	Final
(Nova Scotia) Fisher / Fisher	0	1	0	1	0	1	1	X	4
(Newfoundland and Labrador) Neary / Hancock 🔨	5	0	1	0	1	0	0	X	7

Sheet J	1	2	3	4	5	6	7	8	Final
(Ontario) (Newfoundland and Labrador) Vivier / Codner	1	1	0	0	0	3	0	X	5
(New Brunswick) Tracy / Riggs 🔨	0	0	4	1	2	0	2	X	9

=== Draw 3 ===
Monday, March 17, 10:00 am

Sheet E	1	2	3	4	5	6	7	8	Final
(Manitoba) Hollins / Huminicki 🔨	3	0	2	0	0	2	0	1	8
(Alberta) Duncan / Keenan	0	1	0	1	3	0	1	0	6

Sheet J	1	2	3	4	5	6	7	8	Final
(Alberta) Ryhorchuk / Peterson	0	0	1	0	2	0	0	0	3
(Alberta) Ector / Jacques 🔨	1	1	0	1	0	1	1	2	7

=== Draw 4 ===
Monday, March 17, 1:00 pm

Sheet E	1	2	3	4	5	6	7	8	Final
(Newfoundland and Labrador) Neary / Hancock 🔨	1	0	0	1	0	1	0	0	3
(New Brunswick) Tracy / Riggs	0	1	1	0	1	0	2	1	6

Sheet J	1	2	3	4	5	6	7	8	Final
(Nova Scotia) Fisher / Fisher 🔨	3	0	3	1	1	0	2	X	10
(Ontario) (Newfoundland and Labrador) Vivier / Codner	0	1	0	0	0	2	0	X	3

=== Draw 5 ===
Monday, March 17, 4:00 pm

Sheet E	1	2	3	4	5	6	7	8	Final
(Alberta) Duncan / Keenan	1	2	1	0	1	0	2	X	7
(Alberta) Ector / Jacques 🔨	0	0	0	4	0	1	0	X	5

Sheet J	1	2	3	4	5	6	7	8	Final
(Manitoba) Hollins / Huminicki	1	0	4	2	1	0	X	X	8
(Alberta) Ryhorchuk / Peterson 🔨	0	1	0	0	0	1	X	X	2

=== Draw 6 ===
Monday, March 17, 7:00 pm

Sheet E	1	2	3	4	5	6	7	8	Final
(New Brunswick) Tracy / Riggs	1	0	3	0	0	2	2	X	8
(Nova Scotia) Fisher / Fisher 🔨	0	1	0	1	1	0	0	X	3

Sheet J	1	2	3	4	5	6	7	8	Final
(Ontario) (Newfoundland and Labrador) Vivier / Codner	0	1	0	5	1	0	3	X	10
(Newfoundland and Labrador) Neary / Hancock 🔨	1	0	2	0	0	1	0	X	4

=== Draw 7 ===
Tuesday, March 18, 10:00 am

Sheet E	1	2	3	4	5	6	7	8	Final
(Manitoba) Hollins / Huminicki	0	0	1	0	4	0	2	0	7
(Nova Scotia) Fisher / Fisher 🔨	1	1	0	1	0	1	0	1	5

Sheet J	1	2	3	4	5	6	7	8	Final
(New Brunswick) Tracy / Riggs 🔨	3	1	1	0	3	1	X	X	9
(Alberta) Ryhorchuk / Peterson	0	0	0	2	0	0	X	X	2

=== Draw 8 ===
Tuesday, March 18, 1:00 pm

Sheet E	1	2	3	4	5	6	7	8	Final
(Alberta) Ector / Jacques 🔨	0	0	2	0	0	2	0	0	4
(Ontario) (Newfoundland and Labrador) Vivier / Codner	1	1	0	1	1	0	2	2	8

Sheet J	1	2	3	4	5	6	7	8	9	Final
(Newfoundland and Labrador) Neary / Hancock 🔨	2	0	4	0	0	1	0	0	2	9
(Alberta) Duncan / Keenan	0	2	0	1	1	0	2	1	0	7

=== Draw 9 ===
Tuesday, March 18, 4:00 pm

Sheet E	1	2	3	4	5	6	7	8	Final
(New Brunswick) Tracy / Riggs	2	1	1	0	1	0	2	X	7
(Manitoba) Hollins / Huminicki 🔨	0	0	0	1	0	1	0	X	2

Sheet J	1	2	3	4	5	6	7	8	Final
(Alberta) Ryhorchuk / Peterson	0	2	0	2	0	0	2	0	6
(Nova Scotia) Fisher / Fisher 🔨	1	0	3	0	1	1	0	2	8

=== Draw 10 ===
Tuesday, March 18, 7:00 pm

Sheet E	1	2	3	4	5	6	7	8	Final
(Ontario) (Newfoundland and Labrador) Vivier / Codner 🔨	4	0	2	0	1	1	1	X	9
(Alberta) Duncan / Keenan	0	2	0	1	0	0	0	X	3

Sheet J	1	2	3	4	5	6	7	8	Final
(Alberta) Ector / Jacques	0	2	0	1	1	1	0	4	9
(Newfoundland and Labrador) Neary / Hancock 🔨	1	0	1	0	0	0	2	0	4

=== Draw 11 ===
Wednesday, March 19, 10:00 am

Sheet E	1	2	3	4	5	6	7	8	Final
(Alberta) Ector / Jacques	1	0	0	0	1	0	4	0	6
(New Brunswick) Tracy / Riggs 🔨	0	1	2	1	0	1	0	2	7

Sheet J	1	2	3	4	5	6	7	8	Final
(Nova Scotia) Fisher / Fisher	0	0	1	1	0	0	0	X	2
(Alberta) Duncan / Keenan 🔨	1	2	0	0	1	1	1	X	6

=== Draw 12 ===
Wednesday, March 19, 1:00 pm

Sheet E	1	2	3	4	5	6	7	8	Final
(Alberta) Ryhorchuk / Peterson 🔨	1	0	0	1	0	1	0	X	3
(Newfoundland and Labrador) Neary / Hancock	0	2	1	0	2	0	2	X	7

Sheet J	1	2	3	4	5	6	7	8	Final
(Manitoba) Hollins / Huminicki 🔨	4	1	0	0	4	0	1	X	10
(Ontario) (Newfoundland and Labrador) Vivier / Codner	0	0	3	2	0	2	0	X	7

=== Draw 13 ===
Wednesday, March 19, 4:00 pm

Sheet E	1	2	3	4	5	6	7	8	Final
(Nova Scotia) Fisher / Fisher 🔨	1	1	1	0	1	0	0	1	5
(Alberta) Ector / Jacques	0	0	0	1	0	1	1	0	3

Sheet J	1	2	3	4	5	6	7	8	Final
(Alberta) Duncan / Keenan	0	0	2	1	0	0	0	X	3
(New Brunswick) Tracy / Riggs 🔨	3	1	0	0	1	1	1	X	7

=== Draw 14 ===
Wednesday, March 19, 7:00 pm

Sheet E	1	2	3	4	5	6	7	8	Final
(Ontario) (Newfoundland and Labrador) Vivier / Codner	0	1	0	4	1	0	2	X	8
(Alberta) Ryhorchuk / Peterson 🔨	2	0	1	0	0	1	0	X	4

Sheet J	1	2	3	4	5	6	7	8	Final
(Newfoundland and Labrador) Neary / Hancock	0	0	2	0	2	0	1	1	6
(Manitoba) Hollins / Huminicki 🔨	4	1	0	1	0	1	0	0	7

== Playoffs ==
Semifinal			Final
			1	(New Brunswick) Tracy / Riggs	5
2	(Manitoba) Hollins / Huminicki	4	3	(Ontario) (Newfoundland and Labrador) Vivier / Codner	7
3	(Ontario) (Newfoundland and Labrador) Vivier / Codner	6

=== Semifinal ===
Thursday, March 20, 3:00 pm

Sheet E	1	2	3	4	5	6	7	8	Final
(Manitoba) Hollins / Huminicki 🔨	1	0	1	0	0	1	1	0	4
(Ontario) (Newfoundland and Labrador) Vivier / Codner	0	1	0	3	1	0	0	1	6

=== Final ===
Thursday, March 20, 7:00 pm

Sheet E	1	2	3	4	5	6	7	8	Final
(New Brunswick) Tracy / Riggs 🔨	1	0	1	0	1	0	2	0	5
(Ontario) (Newfoundland and Labrador) Vivier / Codner	0	2	0	2	0	1	0	2	7

== Qualification Events ==
=== East – Moncton ===
November 26–30, Curl Moncton, Moncton, New Brunswick

==== A Event ====
First Knockout	Qualifier 1
(Nova Scotia) Fisher / Fisher	10
(Quebec) Bédard / Bédard	4
(Nova Scotia) Fisher / Fisher	10
(New Brunswick) Watson / Beland	7
(New Brunswick) Watson / Beland	9
(Ontario) Wright / Sinclair	7
(Nova Scotia) Fisher / Fisher	9
(Nova Scotia) Leonard / Dacey	4
(Newfoundland and Labrador) Locke / Perry	6
(New Brunswick) Brown / Hughes	5
(Newfoundland and Labrador) Locke / Perry	7
(Nova Scotia) Leonard / Dacey	8
(Nova Scotia) Leonard / Dacey	9
(Prince Edward Island) Gauthier / MacEwan	2
(Nova Scotia) Fisher / Fisher	9
(Ontario) McCutcheon / Duizer	5
(Nova Scotia) Smith / Mosher	4
(New Brunswick) Siddall / Siddall	8
(New Brunswick) Siddall / Siddall	6
(Ontario) Digigllo / Rajala	4
(Ontario) Digigllo / Rajala	9
(Ontario) Daigle / Blythe	2
(New Brunswick) Siddall / Siddall	1
(Ontario) McCutcheon / Duizer	8
(Ontario) Marcolini / Del Conte	3
(Ontario) McCutcheon / Duizer	9
(Ontario) McCutcheon / Duizer	9
(New Brunswick) Carter / Dalrymple	5
(Alberta) Plett / Hennigar	4
(New Brunswick) Carter / Dalrymple	9

First Knockout	Qualifier 2
(Prince Edward Island) Lenentine / MacFadyen	7
(Ontario) Markle / Garner	2
(Prince Edward Island) Lenentine / MacFadyen	4
(Newfoundland and Labrador) Neary / Hancock	9
(Newfoundland and Labrador) Neary / Hancock	9
(Quebec) Legault / Janidlo	3
(Newfoundland and Labrador) Neary / Hancock	8
(Ontario) Johnston / Stratton	7
(New Brunswick) Smith / Hanson	2
(Ontario) Onischke / Rowley	6	(Ontario) Johnston / Stratton	11
(Ontario) Johnston / Stratton	10	(Ontario) Johnston / Stratton	5
(Nova Scotia) (Ontario) Weissent / Nicholls	4
(Ontario) (Newfoundland and Labrador) Vivier / Codner	4
(Nova Scotia) (Ontario) Weissent / Nicholls	7
(Newfoundland and Labrador) Neary / Hancock	1
(New Brunswick) Tracy / Riggs	13
(Quebec) Gargul / Girard	8
(Ontario) Frlan / MacTavish	6
(Quebec) Gargul / Girard	4
(New Brunswick) Carter / Sallaj	5
(New Brunswick) Carter / Sallaj	9
(Prince Edward Island) Blades / Pineau	4
(New Brunswick) Carter / Sallaj	8
(New Brunswick) Tracy / Riggs	9
(New Brunswick) Tracy / Riggs	8
(New Brunswick) MacDonald / Stewart	5
(New Brunswick) Tracy / Riggs	10
(Nova Scotia) McDonah / McCurdy	0
(Ontario) Ambrosino / O'Connor	4
(Nova Scotia) McDonah / McCurdy	7

==== B Event ====
Second Knockout	Qualifier 3
(Ontario) Digigllo / Rajala	9
(Quebec) Bédard / Bédard	7	(Ontario) Wright / Sinclair	7
(Ontario) Wright / Sinclair	8	(Ontario) Digigllo / Rajala	4
(Ontario) Johnston / Stratton	6
(Ontario) Johnston / Stratton	8
(New Brunswick) Carter / Dalrymple	7
(New Brunswick) Carter / Dalrymple	12
(New Brunswick) Brown / Hughes	12	(New Brunswick) Brown / Hughes	2
(Prince Edward Island) Gauthier / MacEwan	2	(New Brunswick) Carter / Dalrymple	6
(New Brunswick) Carter / Sallaj	5
(Ontario) Johnston / Stratton	5
(New Brunswick) Watson / Beland	7
(New Brunswick) Watson / Beland	9
(Nova Scotia) Smith / Mosher	7	(Nova Scotia) Smith / Mosher	3
(Ontario) Daigle / Blythe	6	(New Brunswick) Watson / Beland	8
(Newfoundland and Labrador) Locke / Perry	1
(Newfoundland and Labrador) Locke / Perry	10
(Ontario) Marcolini / Del Conte	8	(Ontario) Marcolini / Del Conte	4
(Alberta) Plett / Hennigar	7	(New Brunswick) Watson / Beland	8
(Ontario) McCutcheon / Duizer	7

Second Knockout	Qualifier 4
(Quebec) Gargul / Girard	3
(Ontario) Markle / Garner	8	(Quebec) Legault / Janidlo	9
(Quebec) Legault / Janidlo	9	(Quebec) Legault / Janidlo	11
(Nova Scotia) Leonard / Dacey	8
(Quebec) Legault / Janidlo	6
(Ontario) (Newfoundland and Labrador) Vivier / Codner	5
(Nova Scotia) McDonah / McCurdy	5
(Ontario) Onischke / Rowley	0	(Ontario) (Newfoundland and Labrador) Vivier / Codner	6
(Ontario) (Newfoundland and Labrador) Vivier / Codner	13	(Ontario) (Newfoundland and Labrador) Vivier / Codner	7
(New Brunswick) Siddall / Siddall	2
(Quebec) Legault / Janidlo	5
(Ontario) Frlan / MacTavish	7	(Newfoundland and Labrador) Neary / Hancock	7
(Prince Edward Island) Blades / Pineau	5	(Ontario) Frlan / MacTavish	9
(New Brunswick) MacDonald / Stewart	9	(New Brunswick) MacDonald / Stewart	3
(Ontario) Ambrosino / O'Connor	3	(Ontario) Frlan / MacTavish	3
(Nova Scotia) (Ontario) Weissent / Nicholls	7
(Nova Scotia) (Ontario) Weissent / Nicholls	9
(New Brunswick) Smith / Hanson	8	(New Brunswick) Smith / Hanson	5
(Prince Edward Island) Lenentine / MacFadyen	4	(Nova Scotia) (Ontario) Weissent / Nicholls	4
(Newfoundland and Labrador) Neary / Hancock	6

==== C Event ====
Third Knockout	Qualifier 5
(Ontario) Frlan / MacTavish	8
(Quebec) Bédard / Bédard	15	(Quebec) Bédard / Bédard	3
(Prince Edward Island) Gauthier / MacEwan	5	(Ontario) Frlan / MacTavish	2
(Nova Scotia) McDonah / McCurdy	7
(Ontario) Marcolini / Del Conte	3
(Quebec) Gargul / Girard	3	(Nova Scotia) McDonah / McCurdy	10
(Nova Scotia) McDonah / McCurdy	9	(Nova Scotia) McDonah / McCurdy	2
(Ontario) Johnston / Stratton	9

Third Knockout	Qualifier 6
(Nova Scotia) Leonard / Dacey	4
(New Brunswick) Siddall / Siddall	6
(New Brunswick) Siddall / Siddall	6
(Ontario) McCutcheon / Duizer	8
(Ontario) McCutcheon / Duizer	7
(New Brunswick) Carter / Sallaj	2
(New Brunswick) Carter / Sallaj	7
(Ontario) Daigle / Blythe	6	(Alberta) Plett / Hennigar	5
(Alberta) Plett / Hennigar	9	(New Brunswick) Carter / Sallaj	11
(New Brunswick) Carter / Dalrymple	2

Third Knockout	Qualifier 7
(Nova Scotia) Smith / Mosher	6
(Ontario) Markle / Garner	9	(Ontario) Markle / Garner	7
(Ontario) Onischke / Rowley	2	(Ontario) Markle / Garner	8
(Nova Scotia) (Ontario) Weissent / Nicholls	0
(Ontario) Markle / Garner	7
(Ontario) (Newfoundland and Labrador) Vivier / Codner	9
(Newfoundland and Labrador) Locke / Perry	7
(Ontario) Wright / Sinclair	12	(Ontario) Wright / Sinclair	6
(New Brunswick) Brown / Hughes	3	(Newfoundland and Labrador) Locke / Perry	2
(Ontario) (Newfoundland and Labrador) Vivier / Codner	8

Third Knockout	Qualifier 8
(Ontario) Digigllo / Rajala	8
(Prince Edward Island) Blades / Pineau	11	(Prince Edward Island) Blades / Pineau	1
(Ontario) Ambrosino / O'Connor	7	(Ontario) Digigllo / Rajala	9
(Prince Edward Island) Lenentine / MacFadyen	1
(New Brunswick) Smith / Hanson	7
(Prince Edward Island) Lenentine / MacFadyen	9	(Prince Edward Island) Lenentine / MacFadyen	12
(New Brunswick) MacDonald / Stewart	3	(Ontario) Digigllo / Rajala	6
(Quebec) Legault / Janidlo	5

==== Playoffs ====
East Qualifier 1
A2	(New Brunswick) Tracy / Riggs	7
C4	(Ontario) Digigllo / Rajala	4

East Qualifier 2
B1	(New Brunswick) Watson / Beland	8
C3	(Ontario) (Newfoundland and Labrador) Vivier / Codner	9

East Qualifier 3
A1	(Nova Scotia) Fisher / Fisher	13
C2	(Ontario) McCutcheon / Duizer	9

East Qualifier 4
B2	(Newfoundland and Labrador) Neary / Hancock	8
C1	(Ontario) Johnston / Stratton	7

=== West – Brandon ===
November 27 – December 1, Brandon Curling Club, Brandon, Manitoba

==== A Event ====
First Knockout	Qualifier 1
(Alberta) Richards / Davies	8
(Manitoba) R. Buchalter / L. Strand	2
(Alberta) Richards / Davies	5
(Manitoba) Beaudry / Campbell	7
(Manitoba) Beaudry / Campbell	8
(Alberta) Young / Hennig	1
(Manitoba) Beaudry / Campbell	3
(Manitoba) Hollins / Huminicki	5
(Saskatchewan) Speidel / Robinson	6
(Alberta) Iskiw / Hlushak	5
(Saskatchewan) Speidel / Robinson	1
(Manitoba) Hollins / Huminicki	8
(Manitoba) Hollins / Huminicki	8
(Alberta) Mears / Cinnamon	3
(Manitoba) Hollins / Huminicki	8
(Alberta) Ector / Jacques	3
(Alberta) Ector / Jacques	9
(Manitoba) Hayward / Freeman	7
(Alberta) Ector / Jacques	8
(Manitoba) Krahn / Senff	1
(Alberta) Ryhorchuk / Peterson	5
(Manitoba) Krahn / Senff	7
(Alberta) Ector / Jacques	10
(Saskatchewan) Remeshylo / Derksen	8
(Saskatchewan) Remeshylo / Derksen	8
(Manitoba) Robins / Robins	5
(Saskatchewan) Remeshylo / Derksen	8
(Alberta) Duncan / Keenan	3
(Saskatchewan) Todd / Helmeczi	2
(Alberta) Duncan / Keenan	9

First Knockout	Qualifier 2
(Alberta) DeSchiffart / Algot	5
(Ontario) Ferguson / Keon	7
(Ontario) Ferguson / Keon	5
(British Columbia) (Ontario) Bowles / Mulima	13
(British Columbia) (Ontario) Bowles / Mulima	10
(Manitoba) K. Buchalter / H. Strand	4
(British Columbia) (Ontario) Bowles / Mulima	9
(Alberta) Whitbread / Kiist	7
(Alberta) Whitbread / Kiist	7
(Manitoba) Ostrowsky / Ostrowsky	5
(Alberta) Whitbread / Kiist	8
(Manitoba) Letham / Marin	0
(Saskatchewan) Simpson / Derksen	4
(Manitoba) Letham / Marin	5
(British Columbia) (Ontario) Bowles / Mulima	8
(Alberta) Yarmuch / Sawiak	7
(Ontario) Dubinsky / Dubinsky	4
(Ontario) Hari / Hari	8
(Ontario) Hari / Hari	5
(Alberta) Yarmuch / Sawiak	6
(Saskatchewan) Louden / Lussier	5
(Alberta) Yarmuch / Sawiak	10
(Alberta) Yarmuch / Sawiak	9
(Saskatchewan) Rugg / Parenteau	8
(Alberta) Nedohin / Hiebert	11
(Manitoba) Eagles / Brandt	4
(Alberta) Nedohin / Hiebert	5
(Saskatchewan) Rugg / Parenteau	6
(Manitoba) (Alberta) Stoesz / Snider	2
(Saskatchewan) Rugg / Parenteau	10

First Knockout	Qualifier 3
(Saskatchewan) Johnston / Drewitz	7
(Alberta) Wheatcroft / Naugler	3
(Saskatchewan) Johnston / Drewitz	8
(Alberta) (Manitoba) Raniseth / McDonald	6
(Alberta) (Manitoba) Raniseth / McDonald	9
(Yukon) Callan / Solberg	2
(Saskatchewan) Johnston / Drewitz	7
(Manitoba) Evason / Olafson	5
(Manitoba) Evason / Olafson	10
(Alberta) Jacques / Butler	5
(Manitoba) Evason / Olafson	10
(British Columbia) Harris / Duncan-Wu	2
(British Columbia) Harris / Duncan-Wu	9
(Manitoba) Czirfusz / Burgess	1

==== B Event ====
Second Knockout	Qualifier 4
(Saskatchewan) Rugg / Parenteau	9
(Manitoba) R. Buchalter / L. Strand	8	(Manitoba) R. Buchalter / L. Strand	11
(Manitoba) Krahn / Senff	6	(Manitoba) R. Buchalter / L. Strand	3
(Alberta) Duncan / Keenan	6
(Alberta) Whitbread / Kiist	7
(Alberta) Iskiw / Hlushak	6	(Alberta) Duncan / Keenan	8
(Alberta) Duncan / Keenan	7

Second Knockout	Qualifier 5
(Manitoba) Hayward / Freeman	6
(Manitoba) Evason / Olafson	4
(Alberta) Richards / Davies	10
(Alberta) Richards / Davies	9	(Alberta) Richards / Davies	5
(Manitoba) Robins / Robins	3
(Manitoba) Robins / Robins	6
(Saskatchewan) Speidel / Robinson	4

Second Knockout	Qualifier 6
(Ontario) Hari / Hari	6
(Alberta) DeSchiffart / Algot	11	(Alberta) DeSchiffart / Algot	7
(Manitoba) K. Buchalter / H. Strand	1	(Alberta) DeSchiffart / Algot	8
(British Columbia) Harris / Duncan-Wu	6
(Alberta) DeSchiffart / Algot	4
(Alberta) (Manitoba) Raniseth / McDonald	9
(Alberta) Nedohin / Hiebert	9
(Manitoba) Ostrowsky / Ostrowsky	10	(Saskatchewan) Simpson / Derksen	8
(Saskatchewan) Simpson / Derksen	11	(Alberta) Nedohin / Hiebert	4
(Alberta) (Manitoba) Raniseth / McDonald	7

Second Knockout	Qualifier 7
(Ontario) Ferguson / Keon	4
(Ontario) Dubinsky / Dubinsky	0	(Saskatchewan) Louden / Lussier	9
(Saskatchewan) Louden / Lussier	8	(Saskatchewan) Louden / Lussier	2
(Manitoba) Eagles / Brandt	9
(Manitoba) Letham / Marin	4
(Manitoba) Eagles / Brandt	9	(Manitoba) Eagles / Brandt	5
(Manitoba) (Alberta) Stoesz / Snider	3	(Manitoba) Eagles / Brandt	5
(Alberta) Ector / Jacques	9

Second Knockout	Qualifier 8
(Saskatchewan) Remeshylo / Derksen	9
(Alberta) Young / Hennig	5	(Alberta) Jacques / Butler	2
(Alberta) Jacques / Butler	8	(Saskatchewan) Remeshylo / Derksen	5
(Manitoba) Beaudry / Campbell	7
(Manitoba) Beaudry / Campbell	6
(Alberta) Mears / Cinnamon	2	(Manitoba) Czirfusz / Burgess	5
(Manitoba) Czirfusz / Burgess	8

Second Knockout	Qualifier 9
(Alberta) Ryhorchuk / Peterson	12
(Alberta) Yarmuch / Sawiak	8
(Alberta) Wheatcroft / Naugler	5
(Alberta) Ryhorchuk / Peterson	4	(Saskatchewan) Todd / Helmeczi	4
(Saskatchewan) Todd / Helmeczi	7
(Saskatchewan) Todd / Helmeczi	6
(Yukon) Callan / Solberg	5

==== C Event ====
Third Knockout	Qualifier 10
(Alberta) Whitbread / Kiist	9
(Ontario) Ferguson / Keon	9	(Ontario) Ferguson / Keon	8
(Manitoba) Letham / Marin	5	(Alberta) Whitbread / Kiist	4
(Manitoba) Czirfusz / Burgess	10
(Ontario) Hari / Hari	3
(Manitoba) Czirfusz / Burgess	6
(Manitoba) Czirfusz / Burgess	9
(Manitoba) Evason / Olafson	6

Third Knockout	Qualifier 11
(Saskatchewan) Simpson / Derksen	5
(Saskatchewan) Rugg / Parenteau	4
(Saskatchewan) Simpson / Derksen	5
(Saskatchewan) Remeshylo / Derksen	7
(Saskatchewan) Remeshylo / Derksen	10
(Saskatchewan) Todd / Helmeczi	2
(Alberta) Jacques / Butler	9
(Alberta) Mears / Cinnamon	8	(Alberta) Mears / Cinnamon	12
(Alberta) Wheatcroft / Naugler	3	(Alberta) Mears / Cinnamon	5
(Saskatchewan) Todd / Helmeczi	6

Third Knockout	Qualifier 12
(Alberta) Ryhorchuk / Peterson	8
(Manitoba) K. Buchalter / H. Strand	8	(Manitoba) K. Buchalter / H. Strand	4
(Alberta) Young / Hennig	6	(Alberta) Ryhorchuk / Peterson	6
(Manitoba) Eagles / Brandt	2
(Alberta) Ryhorchuk / Peterson	8
(Manitoba) Ostrowsky / Ostrowsky	7
(Manitoba) Robins / Robins	1
(Manitoba) Ostrowsky / Ostrowsky	10	(Manitoba) Ostrowsky / Ostrowsky	8
(Yukon) Callan / Solberg	3	(Manitoba) Ostrowsky / Ostrowsky	8
(Alberta) DeSchiffart / Algot	5

Third Knockout	Qualifier 13
(British Columbia) Harris / Duncan-Wu	9
(Alberta) Iskiw / Hlushak	9	(Alberta) Iskiw / Hlushak	7
(Saskatchewan) Speidel / Robinson	3	(British Columbia) Harris / Duncan-Wu	8
(Alberta) Nedohin / Hiebert	7
(Alberta) Nedohin / Hiebert	7
(Ontario) Dubinsky / Dubinsky	5	(Manitoba) Hayward / Freeman	3
(Manitoba) Hayward / Freeman	10	(British Columbia) Harris / Duncan-Wu	9
(Manitoba) R. Buchalter / L. Strand	4
(Saskatchewan) Louden / Lussier	5
(Manitoba) (Alberta) Stoesz / Snider	5	(Manitoba) Krahn / Senff	8
(Manitoba) Krahn / Senff	8	(Manitoba) Krahn / Senff	6
(Manitoba) R. Buchalter / L. Strand	8

==== Playoffs ====
			West Qualifier 1
			A1	(Manitoba) Hollins / Huminicki	8
B6	(Alberta) Yarmuch / Sawiak	7	B6	(Alberta) Yarmuch / Sawiak	5
C1	(Manitoba) Czirfusz / Burgess	6

			West Qualifier 2
			A3	(Saskatchewan) Johnston / Drewitz	4
B1	(Alberta) Duncan / Keenan	10	B1	(Alberta) Duncan / Keenan	7
C2	(Saskatchewan) Remeshylo / Derksen	5

			West Qualifier 3
			A2	(British Columbia) (Ontario) Bowles / Mulima	3
B5	(Manitoba) Beaudry / Campbell	2	C3	(Alberta) Ryhorchuk / Peterson	6
C3	(Alberta) Ryhorchuk / Peterson	5

West Qualifier 4
B3	(Alberta) (Manitoba) Raniseth / McDonald	9
C4	(British Columbia) Harris / Duncan-Wu	10
C4	(British Columbia) Harris / Duncan-Wu	5
B4	(Alberta) Ector / Jacques	7
B2	(Alberta) Richards / Davies	5
B4	(Alberta) Ector / Jacques	11
