= 2022 Canadian U18 Curling Championships =

- Host city: Oakville, Ontario
- Arena: Oakville Curling Club
- Dates: May 1–7
- Men's winner: Saskatchewan 1
- Curling club: Nutana CC, Saskatoon
- Skip: Matthew Drewitz
- Third: Michael Hom
- Second: Carter Parenteau
- Lead: Jared Tessier
- Coach: Dale Neufeld
- Finalist: Nova Scotia 2 (Mosher)
- Women's winner: Alberta 1
- Curling club: Airdrie CC, Airdrie & Sherwood Park CC, Sherwood Park
- Skip: Myla Plett
- Third: Rachel Jacques
- Second: Alyssa Nedohin
- Lead: Lauren Miller
- Alternate: Chloe Fediuk
- Coach: Blair Lenton
- Finalist: Alberta 2 (Booth)

The 2022 Canadian U18 Curling Championships were held from May 1 to 7 at the Oakville Curling Club in Oakville, Ontario. The event was originally scheduled to be held February 14 to 20 in Timmins, Ontario, however, was postponed due to the COVID-19 pandemic in Ontario.

This was the fourth edition of the Canadian U18 Curling Championships. The inaugural edition was held in Moncton, New Brunswick in 2017 and was again held in New Brunswick in Saint Andrews in 2018. After the 2019 event in Sherwood Park, Alberta, the U18 nationals were cancelled in 2020 and 2021 due to the COVID-19 pandemic. The 2022 event will feature twenty-one teams on both the boys and girls sides, each split into three pools of seven. The top three teams from each pool at the end of the round robin advanced to the playoff round Based on results from the 2018 and 2019 events, certain provinces earned two berths to the championship. On the boys side, all regions except for Quebec, Prince Edward Island and the Northwest Territories earned a second spot and in the girls event, all but Prince Edward Island, Newfoundland and Labrador and the Northwest Territories got a second team.

== Medallists ==
Under-18	Gold	Silver	Bronze
Men	Saskatchewan 1 Matthew Drewitz; Michael Hom; Carter Parenteau; Jared Tessier	Nova Scotia 2 Nick Mosher; Sean Beland; Evan Hennigar; Aidan MacDonald; Owen McPherson	Ontario 1 Kyle Stratton; Liam Tardif; Matthew Pouget; Brayden Appleby; Kibo Mulima
Women	Alberta 1 Myla Plett; Rachel Jacques; Alyssa Nedohin; Lauren Miller; Chloe Fediuk	Alberta 2 Claire Booth; Kaylee Raniseth; Raelyn Helston; Kate Ector; Chloe Johnston	British Columbia 1 Gracelyn Richards; Keelie Duncan; Grace McCusker; Carley Hardie

== Men ==
=== Teams ===
The teams are listed as follows:

Province / Territory	Skip	Third	Second	Lead	Alternate	Club(s)
Alberta 1	Kinley Burton	Justice Jacques	Oliver Burton	Colby Yacey	Nate Burton	Saville Community SC, Edmonton
Alberta 2	Kenan Wipf	Zachary Duncan	Michael Keenan	Max Cinnamon	Nolan Duncan	North Hill/Cochrane
British Columbia 1	Adam Fenton	Alex Duncan-Wu	Peter Sheridan	Wesley Wu		Royal City CC, New Westminster
British Columbia 2	Chris Parkinson	Jackson Nowak	Christian Klein-Beekman	Graham Lee	Connor Litton	Comox Valley CC, Courtenay
Manitoba 1	Jordon McDonald	Jace Freeman	Elias Huminicki	Cameron Olafson		Deer Lodge CC, Winnipeg
Manitoba 2	Ryan Ostrowsky	Jack Stetski	Luke Robins	Logan Strand		West St. Paul CC, West St. Paul
New Brunswick 1	Rajan Dalrymple	John Siddall	Tye Dacey	Cameron Sallaj	Sahil Dalrymple	Gage Golf & CC, Oromocto
New Brunswick 2	Timothy Marin	Jamie Stewart	Samuel Goodine	Emmett Knee	Noah Riggs	Thistle-St. Andrew's CC, Saint John
Newfoundland and Labrador 1	Simon Perry	Nicholas Codner	William Butler	Evan Scott		RE/MAX Centre, St. John's
Newfoundland and Labrador 2	Liam Quinlan	Caleb Tibbs	Luke Wilson	Jack Furlong		Bally Haly CC, St. John's
Northern Ontario 1	Dallas Burgess	Jackson Dubinsky	Matt Duizer	Brayden Sinclair		Kakabeka Falls CC, Kakabeka Falls
Northern Ontario 2	Brendan Rajala	Ian Deschene	Kyle Vainio	Jesse Crozier		Curl Sudbury, Sudbury
Northwest Territories	Julian Bowling	Adam Naugler	Shawn Dragon	Tasir Bhuiyan	Ian Gau	Yellowknife CC, Yellowknife
Nova Scotia 1	Calan MacIsaac	Nathan Gray	Owain Fisher	Christopher McCurdy		Truro CC, Truro
Nova Scotia 2	Nick Mosher	Sean Beland	Evan Hennigar	Aidan MacDonald	Owen McPherson	CFB Halifax CC, Halifax
Ontario 1	Kyle Stratton	Liam Tardif	Matthew Pouget	Brayden Appleby	Kibo Mulima	London CC, London
Ontario 2	Harry Jones	Noah Garner	Owen Henry	Nolan Garlardo	Jack Ragan	Burlington Golf & CC, Burlington
Prince Edward Island	Isaiah Dalton	Connor Bruce	Sheamus Herlihy	Nate MacRae		Cornwall CC, Cornwall
Quebec	Leandre Girard	Justin Lapointe	Xavier Guevin	Louis-François Brassard	Zachary Pedneault	CC Victoria, Quebec City
Saskatchewan 1	Matthew Drewitz	Michael Hom	Carter Parenteau	Jared Tessier		Nutana CC, Saskatoon
Saskatchewan 2	Brayden Heistad	Logan Sawicki	Andy Lloyd	Ryder Helmeczi		Highland CC, Regina

=== Round-robin standings ===
Final round-robin standings

Key
Teams to Playoffs

Pool A	Skip	W	L	DSC
Nova Scotia 1	Calan MacIsaac	6	0	200.5
British Columbia 1	Adam Fenton	4	2	488.1
Northern Ontario 1	Dallas Burgess	3	3	311.8
British Columbia 2	Chris Parkinson	3	3	647.5
Saskatchewan 2	Brayden Heistad	3	3	655.3
New Brunswick 2	Timothy Marin	2	4	366.5
Quebec	Leandre Girard	0	6	648.0

Pool B	Skip	W	L	DSC
Saskatchewan 1	Matthew Drewitz	5	1	442.7
Alberta 1	Kinley Burton	5	1	487.5
Nova Scotia 2	Nick Mosher	5	1	598.6
Northern Ontario 2	Brendan Rajala	3	3	517.7
New Brunswick 1	Rajan Dalrymple	2	4	399.5
Manitoba 2	Ryan Ostrowsky	1	5	547.0
Prince Edward Island	Isaiah Dalton	0	6	857.8

Pool C	Skip	W	L	DSC
Ontario 2	Harry Jones	5	1	331.7
Manitoba 1	Jordon McDonald	4	2	222.1
Ontario 1	Kyle Stratton	4	2	244.1
Alberta 2	Kenan Wipf	4	2	575.9
Northwest Territories	Julian Bowling	2	4	495.3
Newfoundland and Labrador 1	Simon Perry	2	4	431.0
Newfoundland and Labrador 2	Liam Quinlan	0	6	542.7

=== Round-robin results ===
All draw times are listed in Eastern Time (UTC−04:00).

==== Draw 1 ====
Sunday, May 1, 8:00 pm

Sheet 1	1	2	3	4	5	6	7	8	Final
Alberta 2 (Wipf)	3	0	3	0	4	2	X	X	12
Northwest Territories (Bowling)	0	1	0	1	0	0	X	X	2

Sheet 5	1	2	3	4	5	6	7	8	Final
British Columbia 2 (Parkinson)	0	0	0	0	3	1	3	X	7
New Brunswick 2 (Marin)	0	0	1	2	0	0	0	X	3

Sheet 6	1	2	3	4	5	6	7	8	Final
Quebec (Girard)	0	0	0	1	0	0	X	X	1
Nova Scotia 1 (MacIsaac)	3	0	4	0	2	1	X	X	10

Sheet 7	1	2	3	4	5	6	7	8	Final
Saskatchewan 2 (Heistad)	0	0	0	1	0	0	1	X	2
British Columbia 1 (Fenton)	1	2	1	0	2	1	0	X	7

==== Draw 2 ====
Monday, May 2, 8:30 am

Sheet 4	1	2	3	4	5	6	7	8	9	Final
Northern Ontario 2 (Rajala)	1	0	0	1	0	2	0	1	0	5
Nova Scotia 2 (Mosher)	0	0	0	0	3	0	2	0	2	7

Sheet 5	1	2	3	4	5	6	7	8	Final
New Brunswick 1 (Dalrymple)	0	2	0	0	2	0	4	X	8
Prince Edward Island (Dalton)	0	0	0	2	0	1	0	X	3

Sheet 6	1	2	3	4	5	6	7	8	Final
Manitoba 2 (Ostrowsky)	0	0	1	0	0	1	0	X	2
Saskatchewan 1 (Drewitz)	2	0	0	2	1	0	1	X	6

==== Draw 3 ====
Monday, May 2, 12:30 pm

Sheet 1	1	2	3	4	5	6	7	8	Final
Ontario 2 (Jones)	0	2	0	0	2	2	0	X	6
Newfoundland and Labrador 1 (Perry)	0	0	1	0	0	0	1	X	2

Sheet 3	1	2	3	4	5	6	7	8	Final
Manitoba 1 (McDonald)	3	0	0	0	1	3	X	X	7
Newfoundland and Labrador 2 (Quinlan)	0	1	0	1	0	0	X	X	2

Sheet 5	1	2	3	4	5	6	7	8	Final
Northwest Territories (Bowling)	1	0	0	0	0	0	X	X	1
Ontario 1 (Stratton)	0	1	2	1	3	2	X	X	9

==== Draw 4 ====
Monday, May 2, 4:30 pm

Sheet 1	1	2	3	4	5	6	7	8	Final
Northern Ontario 1 (Burgess)	1	0	2	1	0	2	0	0	6
Quebec (Girard)	0	1	0	0	1	0	2	1	5

Sheet 2	1	2	3	4	5	6	7	8	Final
Saskatchewan 1 (Drewitz)	0	3	0	3	0	0	0	2	8
Nova Scotia 2 (Mosher)	0	0	2	0	3	1	1	0	7

Sheet 6	1	2	3	4	5	6	7	8	Final
British Columbia 1 (Fenton)	0	0	2	1	0	0	0	1	4
British Columbia 2 (Parkinson)	0	0	0	0	1	1	0	0	2

Sheet 7	1	2	3	4	5	6	7	8	Final
Manitoba 2 (Ostrowsky)	0	2	0	0	2	0	0	X	4
Northern Ontario 2 (Rajala)	1	0	0	1	0	2	3	X	7

==== Draw 5 ====
Monday, May 2, 8:30 pm

Sheet 4	1	2	3	4	5	6	7	8	Final
Nova Scotia 1 (MacIsaac)	2	0	1	0	4	0	4	X	11
Saskatchewan 2 (Heistad)	0	2	0	1	0	1	0	X	4

Sheet 5	1	2	3	4	5	6	7	8	Final
Newfoundland and Labrador 1 (Perry)	0	0	1	0	1	0	2	0	4
Alberta 2 (Wipf)	0	2	0	1	0	1	0	1	5

Sheet 6	1	2	3	4	5	6	7	8	Final
Prince Edward Island (Dalton)	0	0	0	0	1	0	1	X	2
Alberta 1 (Burton)	2	0	0	2	0	4	0	X	8

==== Draw 6 ====
Tuesday, May 3, 8:00 am

Sheet 3	1	2	3	4	5	6	7	8	Final
Saskatchewan 1 (Drewitz)	0	0	1	0	1	0	3	1	6
New Brunswick 1 (Dalrymple)	1	1	0	1	0	1	0	0	4

Sheet 5	1	2	3	4	5	6	7	8	Final
Nova Scotia 1 (MacIsaac)	0	3	1	0	1	1	2	X	8
British Columbia 2 (Parkinson)	1	0	0	1	0	0	0	X	2

Sheet 7	1	2	3	4	5	6	7	8	Final
Newfoundland and Labrador 2 (Quinlan)	0	0	1	0	0	0	0	X	1
Ontario 2 (Jones)	3	0	0	0	0	2	2	X	7

==== Draw 7 ====
Tuesday, May 3, 11:00 am

Sheet 1	1	2	3	4	5	6	7	8	Final
Prince Edward Island (Dalton)	0	1	0	0	0	1	2	0	4
Manitoba 2 (Ostrowsky)	1	0	1	0	2	0	0	1	5

Sheet 2	1	2	3	4	5	6	7	8	9	Final
Alberta 1 (Burton)	2	1	0	1	2	0	0	0	1	7
Northern Ontario 2 (Rajala)	0	0	3	0	0	0	2	1	0	6

Sheet 6	1	2	3	4	5	6	7	8	Final
Saskatchewan 2 (Heistad)	0	0	2	0	1	0	0	X	3
Northern Ontario 1 (Burgess)	3	0	0	1	0	4	2	X	10

Sheet 7	1	2	3	4	5	6	7	8	Final
New Brunswick 2 (Marin)	2	0	4	2	0	0	2	X	10
Quebec (Girard)	0	1	0	0	2	1	0	X	4

==== Draw 8 ====
Tuesday, May 3, 2:30 pm

Sheet 2	1	2	3	4	5	6	7	8	Final
Manitoba 1 (McDonald)	0	0	0	1	0	0	X	X	1
Alberta 2 (Wipf)	1	1	1	0	2	3	X	X	8

Sheet 3	1	2	3	4	5	6	7	8	9	Final
Ontario 1 (Stratton)	0	0	1	0	2	0	1	0	1	5
Newfoundland and Labrador 1 (Perry)	0	0	0	2	0	1	0	1	0	4

Sheet 6	1	2	3	4	5	6	7	8	Final
Northwest Territories (Bowling)	1	3	0	0	3	0	X	X	7
Newfoundland and Labrador 2 (Quinlan)	0	0	1	1	0	1	X	X	3

==== Draw 9 ====
Tuesday, May 3, 5:45 pm

Sheet 1	1	2	3	4	5	6	7	8	Final
Alberta 1 (Burton)	0	3	0	2	2	0	2	X	9
Saskatchewan 1 (Drewitz)	1	0	2	0	0	3	0	X	6

Sheet 2	1	2	3	4	5	6	7	8	Final
Nova Scotia 2 (Mosher)	4	1	2	0	1	X	X	X	8
Prince Edward Island (Dalton)	0	0	0	1	0	X	X	X	1

Sheet 3	1	2	3	4	5	6	7	8	Final
British Columbia 2 (Parkinson)	0	0	0	0	1	1	1	2	5
Northern Ontario 1 (Burgess)	0	0	0	0	0	0	0	0	0

Sheet 6	1	2	3	4	5	6	7	8	Final
Northern Ontario 2 (Rajala)	1	0	0	5	0	0	0	2	8
New Brunswick 1 (Dalrymple)	0	0	1	0	1	1	3	0	6

==== Draw 10 ====
Tuesday, May 3, 9:00 pm

Sheet 2	1	2	3	4	5	6	7	8	Final
Northwest Territories (Bowling)	0	0	2	2	0	3	0	X	7
Newfoundland and Labrador 1 (Perry)	0	1	0	0	2	0	2	X	5

Sheet 3	1	2	3	4	5	6	7	8	Final
British Columbia 1 (Fenton)	0	0	2	0	0	X	X	X	2
New Brunswick 2 (Marin)	3	2	0	1	2	X	X	X	8

Sheet 5	1	2	3	4	5	6	7	8	Final
Alberta 2 (Wipf)	1	1	0	2	0	0	0	0	4
Ontario 2 (Jones)	0	0	2	0	0	1	2	2	7

==== Draw 11 ====
Wednesday, May 4, 8:30 am

Sheet 1	1	2	3	4	5	6	7	8	Final
Newfoundland and Labrador 2 (Quinlan)	0	0	0	0	0	X	X	X	0
Ontario 1 (Stratton)	3	4	2	3	2	X	X	X	14

Sheet 2	1	2	3	4	5	6	7	8	Final
Quebec (Girard)	0	0	0	1	1	0	2	X	4
British Columbia 1 (Fenton)	4	1	2	0	0	1	0	X	8

Sheet 3	1	2	3	4	5	6	7	8	Final
Prince Edward Island (Dalton)	0	0	0	0	0	1	0	X	1
Northern Ontario 2 (Rajala)	2	0	0	0	1	0	3	X	6

Sheet 5	1	2	3	4	5	6	7	8	9	Final
New Brunswick 2 (Marin)	0	1	0	1	0	0	1	2	0	5
Saskatchewan 2 (Heistad)	2	0	1	0	2	0	0	0	1	6

Sheet 6	1	2	3	4	5	6	7	8	Final
Newfoundland and Labrador 1 (Perry)	0	0	0	0	2	1	0	1	4
Manitoba 1 (McDonald)	0	0	1	0	0	0	2	0	3

Sheet 7	1	2	3	4	5	6	7	8	Final
Northern Ontario 1 (Burgess)	0	1	0	0	1	0	0	X	2
Nova Scotia 1 (MacIsaac)	2	0	2	0	0	1	2	X	7

==== Draw 12 ====
Wednesday, May 4, 12:30 pm

Sheet 3	1	2	3	4	5	6	7	8	Final
Ontario 2 (Jones)	2	0	1	1	1	0	1	X	6
Northwest Territories (Bowling)	0	2	0	0	0	2	0	X	4

Sheet 4	1	2	3	4	5	6	7	8	Final
New Brunswick 1 (Dalrymple)	1	1	0	3	0	0	0	X	5
Manitoba 2 (Ostrowsky)	0	0	1	0	0	1	1	X	3

Sheet 5	1	2	3	4	5	6	7	8	Final
Nova Scotia 2 (Mosher)	0	0	2	1	0	1	1	1	6
Alberta 1 (Burton)	0	4	0	0	1	0	0	0	5

==== Draw 13 ====
Wednesday, May 4, 4:30 pm

Sheet 3	1	2	3	4	5	6	7	8	Final
Saskatchewan 2 (Heistad)	2	0	2	0	0	1	2	X	7
Quebec (Girard)	0	2	0	1	2	0	0	X	5

Sheet 4	1	2	3	4	5	6	7	8	Final
Alberta 2 (Wipf)	0	2	0	0	1	1	0	X	4
Ontario 1 (Stratton)	3	0	0	2	0	0	3	X	8

Sheet 7	1	2	3	4	5	6	7	8	Final
Northern Ontario 2 (Rajala)	0	0	3	0	0	1	0	X	4
Saskatchewan 1 (Drewitz)	1	2	0	1	1	0	2	X	7

==== Draw 14 ====
Wednesday, May 4, 8:30 pm

Sheet 4	1	2	3	4	5	6	7	8	Final
Saskatchewan 1 (Drewitz)	4	0	2	0	0	2	0	X	8
Prince Edward Island (Dalton)	0	0	0	0	2	0	2	X	4

Sheet 7	1	2	3	4	5	6	7	8	Final
Ontario 2 (Jones)	0	0	0	0	0	0	X	X	0
Manitoba 1 (McDonald)	2	0	0	0	2	1	X	X	5

==== Draw 15 ====
Thursday, May 5, 8:30 am

Sheet 2	1	2	3	4	5	6	7	8	Final
New Brunswick 2 (Marin)	0	1	0	0	1	0	0	X	2
Nova Scotia 1 (MacIsaac)	2	0	1	0	0	1	2	X	6

Sheet 4	1	2	3	4	5	6	7	8	Final
Quebec (Girard)	1	0	1	0	1	0	0	X	3
British Columbia 2 (Parkinson)	0	1	0	2	0	3	2	X	8

Sheet 5	1	2	3	4	5	6	7	8	Final
British Columbia 1 (Fenton)	0	0	2	0	2	0	2	0	6
Northern Ontario 1 (Burgess)	0	0	0	0	0	3	0	1	4

Sheet 7	1	2	3	4	5	6	7	8	Final
Nova Scotia 2 (Mosher)	0	3	2	0	4	1	X	X	10
Manitoba 2 (Ostrowsky)	1	0	0	2	0	0	X	X	3

==== Draw 16 ====
Thursday, May 5, 12:30 pm

Sheet 2	1	2	3	4	5	6	7	8	Final
Ontario 1 (Stratton)	0	2	1	0	0	0	0	0	3
Ontario 2 (Jones)	0	0	0	1	1	0	1	1	4

Sheet 3	1	2	3	4	5	6	7	8	Final
Newfoundland and Labrador 2 (Quinlan)	0	0	0	0	1	0	2	X	3
Alberta 2 (Wipf)	0	2	0	1	0	2	0	X	5

Sheet 4	1	2	3	4	5	6	7	8	Final
Manitoba 1 (McDonald)	2	0	2	0	3	0	1	0	8
Northwest Territories (Bowling)	0	3	0	1	0	1	0	2	7

Sheet 5	1	2	3	4	5	6	7	8	Final
Alberta 1 (Burton)	2	0	1	2	2	3	0	X	10
New Brunswick 1 (Dalrymple)	0	2	0	0	0	0	3	X	5

==== Draw 17 ====
Thursday, May 5, 4:30 pm

Sheet 1	1	2	3	4	5	6	7	8	Final
Nova Scotia 1 (MacIsaac)	0	0	5	2	0	X	X	X	7
British Columbia 1 (Fenton)	0	0	0	0	1	X	X	X	1

Sheet 2	1	2	3	4	5	6	7	8	Final
British Columbia 2 (Parkinson)	1	0	0	0	0	1	1	X	3
Saskatchewan 2 (Heistad)	0	1	1	2	2	0	0	X	6

Sheet 3	1	2	3	4	5	6	7	8	Final
Manitoba 2 (Ostrowsky)	1	0	1	1	0	3	0	0	6
Alberta 1 (Burton)	0	2	0	0	1	0	3	1	7

==== Draw 18 ====
Thursday, May 5, 8:30 pm

Sheet 1	1	2	3	4	5	6	7	8	Final
Ontario 1 (Stratton)	1	0	1	0	1	1	0	0	4
Manitoba 1 (McDonald)	0	2	0	2	0	0	0	1	5

Sheet 2	1	2	3	4	5	6	7	8	Final
Newfoundland and Labrador 1 (Perry)	0	0	4	1	2	0	1	X	8
Newfoundland and Labrador 2 (Quinlan)	1	1	0	0	0	1	0	X	3

Sheet 3	1	2	3	4	5	6	7	8	Final
New Brunswick 1 (Dalrymple)	0	1	0	0	0	0	X	X	1
Nova Scotia 2 (Mosher)	1	0	3	1	1	2	X	X	8

Sheet 4	1	2	3	4	5	6	7	8	Final
Northern Ontario 1 (Burgess)	2	0	1	0	0	1	0	1	5
New Brunswick 2 (Marin)	0	1	0	1	0	0	2	0	4

=== Playoffs ===
Qualification Game
8	British Columbia 1	3
9	Northern Ontario 1	5

Quarterfinals
1	Nova Scotia 1	5
9	Northern Ontario 1	3
4	Alberta 1	1
5	Nova Scotia 2	6
2	Ontario 2	5
7	Ontario 1	7
3	Saskatchewan 1	5
6	Manitoba 1	4

Semifinals
1	Nova Scotia 1	6
5	Nova Scotia 2	8
7	Ontario 1	3
3	Saskatchewan 1	9

Final
5	Nova Scotia 2	4
3	Saskatchewan 1	5

==== Qualification game ====
Friday, May 6, 8:00 am

Sheet 6	1	2	3	4	5	6	7	8	Final
British Columbia 1 (Fenton)	0	1	0	0	0	0	2	0	3
Northern Ontario 1 (Burgess)	0	0	0	0	0	4	0	1	5

==== Quarterfinals ====
Friday, May 6, 8:00 am

Sheet 1	1	2	3	4	5	6	7	8	Final
Alberta 1 (Burton)	1	0	0	0	0	0	0	X	1
Nova Scotia 2 (Mosher)	0	0	2	1	1	1	1	X	6

Sheet 3	1	2	3	4	5	6	7	8	Final
Ontario 2 (Jones)	0	0	3	0	2	0	0	0	5
Ontario 1 (Stratton)	1	1	0	2	0	1	1	1	7

Sheet 4	1	2	3	4	5	6	7	8	Final
Saskatchewan 1 (Drewitz)	0	0	2	0	1	1	0	1	5
Manitoba 1 (McDonald)	2	0	0	1	0	0	1	0	4

Friday, May 6, 12:00 pm

Sheet 1	1	2	3	4	5	6	7	8	Final
Nova Scotia 1 (MacIsaac)	0	3	0	0	0	1	0	1	5
Northern Ontario 1 (Burgess)	1	0	0	1	0	0	1	0	3

==== Semifinals ====
Friday, May 6, 4:00 pm

Sheet 2	1	2	3	4	5	6	7	8	Final
Ontario 1 (Stratton)	0	0	0	1	1	1	0	X	3
Saskatchewan 1 (Drewitz)	1	4	2	0	0	0	2	X	9

Saturday, May 7, 8:30 am

Sheet 3	1	2	3	4	5	6	7	8	Final
Nova Scotia 1 (MacIsaac)	0	2	0	0	2	0	2	0	6
Nova Scotia 2 (Mosher)	1	0	1	1	0	2	0	3	8

==== Final ====
Saturday, May 7, 4:30 pm

Sheet 6	1	2	3	4	5	6	7	8	Final
Nova Scotia 2 (Mosher)	1	0	0	0	2	0	1	0	4
Saskatchewan 1 (Drewitz)	0	2	1	0	0	1	0	1	5

=== Consolation ===
==== A Bracket ====
Bronze medal game
1	Nova Scotia 1	2
7	Ontario 1	3

5th/6th
9	Northern Ontario 1	1
2	Ontario 2	6

			5th/6th
			6	Manitoba 1	4
8	British Columbia 1	3	4	Alberta 1	6
4	Alberta 1	7

==== B Bracket ====
			10th/11th
			10	Alberta 2	5
12	British Columbia 2	7	12	British Columbia 2	4
15	New Brunswick 1	6

			10th/11th
			11	Northern Ontario 2	5
13	Saskatchewan 2	10	13	Saskatchewan 2	7
14	New Brunswick 2	7

12th/13th
15	New Brunswick 1	6
11	Northern Ontario 2	2

12th/13th
14	New Brunswick 2	5
12	British Columbia 2	4

==== C Bracket ====
			16th/17th
			17	Northwest Territories	8
19	Newfoundland and Labrador 2	4	20	Quebec	12
20	Quebec	7

			16th/17th
			16	Newfoundland and Labrador 1	4
18	Manitoba 2	6	18	Manitoba 2	3
21	Prince Edward Island	5

18th/19th
19	Newfoundland and Labrador 2	1
18	Manitoba 2	9

18th/19th
21	Prince Edward Island	L
17	Northwest Territories	W/O

=== Final standings ===
Place	Team
1st place, gold medalist(s)	Saskatchewan 1
2nd place, silver medalist(s)	Nova Scotia 2
3rd place, bronze medalist(s)	Ontario 1
4	Nova Scotia 1
5	Ontario 2
6	Alberta 1
7	Manitoba 1
8	Northern Ontario 1
9	British Columbia 1
10	Alberta 2
11	Saskatchewan 2
12	New Brunswick 2
13	New Brunswick 1
14	Northern Ontario 2
15	British Columbia 2
16	Newfoundland and Labrador 1
17	Quebec
18	Northwest Territories
19	Manitoba 2
20	Newfoundland and Labrador 2
21	Prince Edward Island

== Women ==
=== Teams ===
The teams are listed as follows:

Province / Territory	Skip	Third	Second	Lead	Alternate	Club(s)
Alberta 1	Myla Plett	Rachel Jacques	Alyssa Nedohin	Lauren Miller	Chloe Fediuk	Airdrie/Sherwood Park
Alberta 2	Claire Booth	Kaylee Raniseth	Raelyn Helston	Kate Ector	Chloe Johnston	Calgary CC, Calgary
British Columbia 1	Gracelyn Richards	Keelie Duncan	Grace McCusker	Carley Hardie		Comox Valley CC, Courtenay
British Columbia 2	Emily Bowles	Meredith Cole	Keira McCoy	Chelsea Taylor		Royal City CC, New Westminster
Manitoba 1	Zoey Terrick	Cassidy Dundas	Tessa Terrick	Madison Sagert		Neepawa CC, Neepawa
Manitoba 2	Grace Beaudry	Arianne Courcelles	Jensen Letham	Chelsea Swalie		St. Vital CC, Winnipeg
New Brunswick 1	Celia Evans	Marlise Carter	Julia Evans	Sierra Tracy		Gage Golf & CC, Oromocto
New Brunswick 2	Sarah Gaines	Leah Cluff	Carly Smith	Ashley Coughlan		Capital WC, Fredericton
Newfoundland and Labrador	Cailey Locke	Katie Peddigrew	Sitaye Penney	Kate Young		RE/MAX Centre, St. John's
Northern Ontario 1	Mia Toner	Valerie Ouimet	Justine Toner	Clara Dissanayake		Curl Sudbury, Sudbury
Northern Ontario 2	Britney Malette	Maddy Hollins	Karli Hicklin	Jaime Sinclair		Kakabeka Falls CC, Kakabeka Falls
Northwest Territories	Pearl Gillis	Tamara Bain	Adrianna Hendrick	Tyra Bain		Inuvik CC, Inuvik
Nova Scotia 1	Marin Callaghan	Maria Fitzgerald	MacKenzie Hill	Peyton Bowser		Mayflower CC, Halifax
Nova Scotia 2	Sophie Blades	Kate Weissent	Stephanie Atherton	Alexis Cluney		Chester CC, Chester
Ontario 1	Emma Acres	Ava Acres	Liana Flanagan	Mya Sharpe	Aila Thompson	RCMP CC, Ottawa
Ontario 2	Charlotte Johnston	Julia Markle	Scotia Maltham	Brooklyn Ideson	Jenna Declerq	London CC, London
Prince Edward Island	Ella Lenentine	Makiya Noonan	Kacey Gauthier	Erika Pater		Cornwall CC, Cornwall
Quebec 1	Jolianne Fortin	Emy Lafrance	Megan Lafrance	Mégane Fortin		CC Kénogami, Jonquière
Quebec 2	Elizabeth Cyr	Stella-Rose Venne	Amber Gargul	Alexandra Legault		CC Laval-sur-le-lac, Laval
Saskatchewan 1	Savanna Taylor	Annika Steckler	Ava Beausoleil	Katlyn Kennedy	Leah Beausoleil	Nutana CC, Saskatoon
Saskatchewan 2	Elizabeth Kessel	Tesa Silversides	Mya Silversides	Hannah Rugg		Highland CC, Regina

=== Round-robin standings ===
Final round-robin standings

Key
Teams to Playoffs

Pool A	Skip	W	L	DSC
Nova Scotia 1	Marin Callaghan	5	1	824.3
New Brunswick 2	Sarah Gaines	4	2	500.7
British Columbia 1	Gracelyn Richards	4	2	725.6
Ontario 1	Emma Acres	3	3	473.1
British Columbia 2	Emily Bowles	2	4	385.4
Manitoba 2	Grace Beaudry	2	4	931.7
Prince Edward Island	Ella Lenentine	1	5	955.4

Pool B	Skip	W	L	DSC
Nova Scotia 2	Sophie Blades	5	1	386.1
Alberta 2	Claire Booth	5	1	429.6
Northern Ontario 1	Mia Toner	4	2	541.7
Ontario 2	Charlotte Johnston	3	3	722.9
New Brunswick 1	Celia Evans	2	4	354.5
Manitoba 1	Zoey Terrick	2	4	507.0
Newfoundland and Labrador	Cailey Locke	0	6	588.6

Pool C	Skip	W	L	DSC
Saskatchewan 2	Elizabeth Kessel	4	2	602.4
Alberta 1	Myla Plett	4	2	436.6
Quebec 1	Jolianne Fortin	3	3	566.6
Quebec 2	Elizabeth Cyr	3	3	240.6
Northern Ontario 2	Britney Malette	3	3	549.6
Saskatchewan 1	Savanna Taylor	2	4	504.6
Northwest Territories	Pearl Gillis	2	4	918.4

=== Round-robin results ===
All draw times are listed in Eastern Time (UTC−04:00).

==== Draw 1 ====
Sunday, May 1, 8:00 pm

Sheet 2	1	2	3	4	5	6	7	8	Final
Northern Ontario 2 (Malette)	0	2	1	1	1	0	0	0	5
Northwest Territories (Gillis)	0	0	0	0	0	1	1	1	3

Sheet 3	1	2	3	4	5	6	7	8	Final
Saskatchewan 2 (Kessel)	1	0	2	0	0	2	0	0	5
Quebec 1 (Fortin)	0	1	0	1	1	0	1	2	6

Sheet 4	1	2	3	4	5	6	7	8	Final
Alberta 1 (Plett)	0	1	0	1	1	0	0	0	3
Quebec 2 (Cyr)	0	0	2	0	0	1	1	2	6

==== Draw 2 ====
Monday, May 2, 8:30 am

Sheet 1	1	2	3	4	5	6	7	8	Final
Manitoba 2 (Beaudry)	0	0	1	0	1	0	1	X	3
British Columbia 1 (Richards)	2	2	0	1	0	1	0	X	6

Sheet 2	1	2	3	4	5	6	7	8	Final
Prince Edward Island (Lenentine)	0	1	0	0	0	2	0	X	3
Ontario 1 (Acres)	0	0	3	0	3	0	4	X	10

Sheet 3	1	2	3	4	5	6	7	8	Final
British Columbia 2 (Bowles)	1	1	1	1	0	0	0	2	6
New Brunswick 2 (Gaines)	0	0	0	0	2	1	2	0	5

Sheet 7	1	2	3	4	5	6	7	8	Final
Nova Scotia 2 (Blades)	0	2	0	0	0	0	1	0	3
Ontario 2 (Johnston)	0	0	1	2	1	1	0	1	6

==== Draw 3 ====
Monday, May 2, 12:30 pm

Sheet 2	1	2	3	4	5	6	7	8	Final
New Brunswick 1 (Evans)	0	0	3	1	0	0	0	1	5
Newfoundland and Labrador (Locke)	0	0	0	0	1	1	0	0	2

Sheet 4	1	2	3	4	5	6	7	8	Final
Quebec 1 (Fortin)	1	0	2	0	0	3	0	3	9
Northern Ontario 2 (Malette)	0	1	0	2	4	0	1	0	8

Sheet 6	1	2	3	4	5	6	7	8	Final
Alberta 2 (Booth)	0	3	0	0	0	0	0	2	5
Northern Ontario 1 (Toner)	1	0	0	0	1	1	1	0	4

Sheet 7	1	2	3	4	5	6	7	8	Final
Northwest Territories (Gillis)	0	1	1	0	0	2	0	X	4
Saskatchewan 1 (Taylor)	2	0	0	6	1	0	2	X	11

==== Draw 4 ====
Monday, May 2, 4:30 pm

Sheet 3	1	2	3	4	5	6	7	8	Final
Ontario 1 (Acres)	1	0	2	0	2	0	0	1	6
Manitoba 2 (Beaudry)	0	1	0	2	0	0	1	0	4

Sheet 4	1	2	3	4	5	6	7	8	Final
British Columbia 1 (Richards)	1	1	1	0	1	0	4	X	8
British Columbia 2 (Bowles)	0	0	0	1	0	1	0	X	2

Sheet 5	1	2	3	4	5	6	7	8	Final
Nova Scotia 1 (Callaghan)	2	0	1	1	2	3	X	X	9
Prince Edward Island (Lenentine)	0	1	0	0	0	0	X	X	1

==== Draw 5 ====
Monday, May 2, 8:30 pm

Sheet 1	1	2	3	4	5	6	7	8	Final
Alberta 2 (Booth)	0	1	1	0	0	0	1	0	3
Nova Scotia 2 (Blades)	0	0	0	2	0	1	0	3	6

Sheet 2	1	2	3	4	5	6	7	8	9	Final
Northern Ontario 1 (Toner)	1	0	1	0	2	0	0	0	1	5
Ontario 2 (Johnston)	0	1	0	1	0	1	0	1	0	4

Sheet 3	1	2	3	4	5	6	7	8	Final
Newfoundland and Labrador (Locke)	0	0	1	0	0	2	0	X	3
Manitoba 1 (Terrick)	1	2	0	0	2	0	2	X	7

Sheet 7	1	2	3	4	5	6	7	8	Final
Quebec 2 (Cyr)	0	0	1	1	1	0	1	0	4
Saskatchewan 2 (Kessel)	3	0	0	0	0	1	0	2	6

==== Draw 6 ====
Tuesday, May 3, 8:00 am

Sheet 1	1	2	3	4	5	6	7	8	Final
Ontario 1 (Acres)	1	0	0	1	1	0	2	2	7
British Columbia 2 (Bowles)	0	2	3	0	0	1	0	0	6

Sheet 2	1	2	3	4	5	6	7	8	9	Final
Manitoba 2 (Beaudry)	1	1	1	1	0	0	0	1	1	6
Nova Scotia 1 (Callaghan)	0	0	0	0	2	1	2	0	0	5

Sheet 4	1	2	3	4	5	6	7	8	Final
New Brunswick 2 (Gaines)	0	0	5	1	0	0	0	1	7
Prince Edward Island (Lenentine)	2	1	0	0	1	1	1	0	6

Sheet 6	1	2	3	4	5	6	7	8	Final
Quebec 1 (Fortin)	0	0	0	0	1	0	0	X	1
Alberta 1 (Plett)	1	1	1	1	0	2	2	X	8

==== Draw 7 ====
Tuesday, May 3, 11:00 am

Sheet 3	1	2	3	4	5	6	7	8	Final
Northern Ontario 1 (Toner)	0	2	0	2	2	0	3	X	9
New Brunswick 1 (Evans)	0	0	2	0	0	1	0	X	3

Sheet 4	1	2	3	4	5	6	7	8	Final
Newfoundland and Labrador (Locke)	0	1	0	0	1	X	X	X	2
Alberta 2 (Booth)	5	0	2	1	0	X	X	X	8

Sheet 5	1	2	3	4	5	6	7	8	Final
Manitoba 1 (Terrick)	0	0	0	0	1	0	2	0	3
Nova Scotia 2 (Blades)	0	0	0	2	0	2	0	1	5

==== Draw 8 ====
Tuesday, May 3, 2:30 pm

Sheet 1	1	2	3	4	5	6	7	8	Final
Alberta 1 (Plett)	0	2	0	0	1	0	0	1	4
Northern Ontario 2 (Malette)	2	0	0	0	0	0	1	0	3

Sheet 4	1	2	3	4	5	6	7	8	9	Final
Saskatchewan 1 (Taylor)	2	0	1	0	3	0	0	0	1	7
Quebec 1 (Fortin)	0	0	0	2	0	2	0	2	0	6

Sheet 5	1	2	3	4	5	6	7	8	Final
Northwest Territories (Gillis)	1	0	0	0	0	2	0	3	6
Quebec 2 (Cyr)	0	0	0	2	1	0	1	0	4

Sheet 7	1	2	3	4	5	6	7	8	9	Final
British Columbia 2 (Bowles)	0	0	1	0	3	0	0	2	0	6
Nova Scotia 1 (Callaghan)	0	0	0	2	0	3	1	0	1	7

==== Draw 9 ====
Tuesday, May 3, 5:45 pm

Sheet 4	1	2	3	4	5	6	7	8	Final
Nova Scotia 2 (Blades)	0	2	1	1	0	2	X	X	6
New Brunswick 1 (Evans)	0	0	0	0	0	0	X	X	0

Sheet 5	1	2	3	4	5	6	7	8	Final
Ontario 2 (Johnston)	4	0	0	1	1	0	2	X	8
Newfoundland and Labrador (Locke)	0	1	1	0	0	2	0	X	4

Sheet 7	1	2	3	4	5	6	7	8	9	Final
Manitoba 1 (Terrick)	0	2	0	0	0	3	0	0	0	5
Northern Ontario 1 (Toner)	2	0	0	1	1	0	0	1	1	6

==== Draw 10 ====
Tuesday, May 3, 9:00 pm

Sheet 1	1	2	3	4	5	6	7	8	9	Final
New Brunswick 2 (Gaines)	1	2	0	1	0	3	0	0	1	8
Manitoba 2 (Beaudry)	0	0	1	0	3	0	2	1	0	7

Sheet 4	1	2	3	4	5	6	7	8	Final
Saskatchewan 2 (Kessel)	1	0	0	2	1	0	1	1	6
Northwest Territories (Gillis)	0	2	0	0	0	1	0	0	3

Sheet 6	1	2	3	4	5	6	7	8	Final
Quebec 2 (Cyr)	1	2	0	1	0	1	0	1	6
Saskatchewan 1 (Taylor)	0	0	1	0	2	0	1	0	4

Sheet 7	1	2	3	4	5	6	7	8	Final
Prince Edward Island (Lenentine)	0	0	1	0	1	0	X	X	2
British Columbia 1 (Richards)	3	2	0	1	0	2	X	X	8

==== Draw 11 ====
Wednesday, May 4, 8:30 am

Sheet 4	1	2	3	4	5	6	7	8	Final
Ontario 2 (Johnston)	0	0	1	0	1	0	0	1	3
Manitoba 1 (Terrick)	0	1	0	1	0	1	1	0	4

==== Draw 12 ====
Wednesday, May 4, 12:30 pm

Sheet 1	1	2	3	4	5	6	7	8	Final
Nova Scotia 1 (Callaghan)	1	0	4	0	2	1	0	X	8
Ontario 1 (Acres)	0	1	0	1	0	0	2	X	4

Sheet 2	1	2	3	4	5	6	7	8	Final
British Columbia 1 (Richards)	0	1	0	0	0	0	X	X	1
New Brunswick 2 (Gaines)	3	0	0	3	1	2	X	X	9

Sheet 6	1	2	3	4	5	6	7	8	Final
Manitoba 2 (Beaudry)	3	0	3	0	2	2	0	X	10
Prince Edward Island (Lenentine)	0	1	0	3	0	0	1	X	5

Sheet 7	1	2	3	4	5	6	7	8	Final
New Brunswick 1 (Evans)	0	0	2	0	0	0	0	X	2
Alberta 2 (Booth)	0	2	0	2	0	0	3	X	7

==== Draw 13 ====
Wednesday, May 4, 4:30 pm

Sheet 1	1	2	3	4	5	6	7	8	Final
Northwest Territories (Gillis)	1	0	3	1	0	0	1	1	7
Quebec 1 (Fortin)	0	3	0	0	0	3	0	0	6

Sheet 2	1	2	3	4	5	6	7	8	Final
Saskatchewan 2 (Kessel)	0	0	0	2	1	2	2	X	7
Alberta 1 (Plett)	2	2	0	0	0	0	0	X	4

Sheet 5	1	2	3	4	5	6	7	8	Final
Northern Ontario 2 (Malette)	1	0	0	3	2	0	1	0	7
Saskatchewan 1 (Taylor)	0	0	3	0	0	1	0	2	6

Sheet 6	1	2	3	4	5	6	7	8	9	Final
Newfoundland and Labrador (Locke)	0	2	0	1	0	0	1	1	0	5
Nova Scotia 2 (Blades)	0	0	3	0	1	1	0	0	2	7

==== Draw 14 ====
Wednesday, May 4, 8:30 pm

Sheet 1	1	2	3	4	5	6	7	8	9	Final
New Brunswick 1 (Evans)	1	3	0	0	0	0	0	1	0	5
Ontario 2 (Johnston)	0	0	1	2	1	1	0	0	1	6

Sheet 2	1	2	3	4	5	6	7	8	Final
Alberta 2 (Booth)	0	0	0	2	0	1	0	2	5
Manitoba 1 (Terrick)	0	0	0	0	2	0	2	0	4

Sheet 3	1	2	3	4	5	6	7	8	9	Final
British Columbia 1 (Richards)	0	0	1	0	1	2	0	1	0	5
Nova Scotia 1 (Callaghan)	0	2	0	2	0	0	1	0	1	6

Sheet 5	1	2	3	4	5	6	7	8	Final
Prince Edward Island (Lenentine)	0	1	0	3	2	0	1	0	7
British Columbia 2 (Bowles)	1	0	1	0	0	2	0	1	5

Sheet 6	1	2	3	4	5	6	7	8	9	Final
New Brunswick 2 (Gaines)	1	0	0	1	1	0	1	1	1	6
Ontario 1 (Acres)	0	1	2	0	0	2	0	0	0	5

==== Draw 15 ====
Thursday, May 5, 8:30 am

Sheet 1	1	2	3	4	5	6	7	8	Final
Saskatchewan 1 (Taylor)	0	2	0	0	1	0	0	0	3
Saskatchewan 2 (Kessel)	1	0	2	1	0	0	1	2	7

Sheet 3	1	2	3	4	5	6	7	8	Final
Quebec 2 (Cyr)	0	0	0	0	1	0	3	0	4
Northern Ontario 2 (Malette)	0	0	0	0	0	2	0	1	3

Sheet 6	1	2	3	4	5	6	7	8	Final
Alberta 1 (Plett)	1	0	0	1	1	1	1	X	5
Northwest Territories (Gillis)	0	1	0	0	0	0	0	X	1

==== Draw 16 ====
Thursday, May 5, 12:30 pm

Sheet 1	1	2	3	4	5	6	7	8	Final
Northern Ontario 1 (Toner)	0	0	2	1	0	2	0	X	5
Newfoundland and Labrador (Locke)	0	0	0	0	2	0	1	X	3

Sheet 6	1	2	3	4	5	6	7	8	Final
Nova Scotia 1 (Callaghan)	1	0	1	3	0	1	0	1	7
New Brunswick 2 (Gaines)	0	0	0	0	3	0	1	0	4

Sheet 7	1	2	3	4	5	6	7	8	9	Final
Manitoba 1 (Terrick)	0	0	2	0	1	0	1	1	0	5
New Brunswick 1 (Evans)	0	2	0	1	0	2	0	0	1	6

==== Draw 17 ====
Thursday, May 5, 4:30 pm

Sheet 4	1	2	3	4	5	6	7	8	Final
British Columbia 2 (Bowles)	0	0	2	0	1	1	1	X	5
Manitoba 2 (Beaudry)	0	1	0	1	0	0	0	X	2

Sheet 5	1	2	3	4	5	6	7	8	Final
Ontario 1 (Acres)	0	2	0	0	0	0	X	X	2
British Columbia 1 (Richards)	2	0	3	2	1	2	X	X	10

Sheet 6	1	2	3	4	5	6	7	8	Final
Ontario 2 (Johnston)	0	0	2	0	1	0	2	X	5
Alberta 2 (Booth)	0	3	0	1	0	2	0	X	6

Sheet 7	1	2	3	4	5	6	7	8	Final
Saskatchewan 1 (Taylor)	0	0	0	0	1	0	1	X	2
Alberta 1 (Plett)	0	1	0	1	0	4	0	X	6

==== Draw 18 ====
Thursday, May 5, 8:30 pm

Sheet 5	1	2	3	4	5	6	7	8	Final
Nova Scotia 2 (Blades)	0	1	2	0	2	1	2	X	8
Northern Ontario 1 (Toner)	0	0	0	1	0	0	0	X	1

Sheet 6	1	2	3	4	5	6	7	8	Final
Northern Ontario 2 (Malette)	0	2	1	1	1	0	0	X	5
Saskatchewan 2 (Kessel)	0	0	0	0	0	2	1	X	3

Sheet 7	1	2	3	4	5	6	7	8	Final
Quebec 1 (Fortin)	0	1	0	2	1	0	2	2	8
Quebec 2 (Cyr)	2	0	2	0	0	3	0	0	7

=== Playoffs ===
Qualification Game
8	Saskatchewan 2	2
9	Quebec 1	3

Quarterfinals
1	Nova Scotia 2	3
9	Quebec 1	4
4	Alberta 1	10
5	New Brunswick 1	3
2	Alberta 2	8
7	Northern Ontario 1	0
3	Nova Scotia 1	3
6	British Columbia 1	7

Semifinals
9	Quebec 1	2
4	Alberta 1	9
2	Alberta 2	7
7	British Columbia 1	6

Final
4	Alberta 1	3
2	Alberta 2	1

==== Qualification game ====
Friday, May 6, 8:00 am

Sheet 5	1	2	3	4	5	6	7	8	Final
Saskatchewan 2 (Kessel)	1	0	0	0	1	0	0	0	2
Quebec 1 (Fortin)	0	0	1	0	0	1	0	1	3

==== Quarterfinals ====
Friday, May 6, 8:00 am

Sheet 2	1	2	3	4	5	6	7	8	Final
Alberta 2 (Booth)	1	1	2	1	2	1	X	X	8
Northern Ontario 1 (Toner)	0	0	0	0	0	0	X	X	0

Sheet 7	1	2	3	4	5	6	7	8	Final
Alberta 1 (Plett)	2	1	0	5	0	2	X	X	10
New Brunswick 1 (Gaines)	0	0	2	0	1	0	X	X	3

Friday, May 6, 12:00 pm

Sheet 6	1	2	3	4	5	6	7	8	Final
Nova Scotia 2 (Blades)	0	1	0	0	0	2	0	0	3
Quebec 1 (Fortin)	0	0	1	0	0	0	2	1	4

Sheet 7	1	2	3	4	5	6	7	8	Final
Nova Scotia 1 (Callaghan)	1	0	0	1	0	1	0	X	3
British Columbia 1 (Richards)	0	0	2	0	2	0	3	X	7

==== Semifinals ====
Friday, May 6, 8:00 pm

Sheet 4	1	2	3	4	5	6	7	8	Final
Alberta 2 (Booth)	1	0	1	2	0	2	0	1	7
British Columbia 1 (Richards)	0	3	0	0	2	0	1	0	6

Saturday, May 7, 8:30 am

Sheet 4	1	2	3	4	5	6	7	8	Final
Quebec 1 (Fortin)	0	0	0	0	2	0	X	X	2
Alberta 1 (Plett)	3	1	3	1	0	1	X	X	9

==== Final ====
Saturday, May 7, 12:30 pm

Sheet 6	1	2	3	4	5	6	7	8	Final
Alberta 1 (Plett)	0	0	0	1	1	1	0	X	3
Alberta 2 (Booth)	0	0	0	0	0	0	1	X	1

=== Consolation ===
==== A Bracket ====
Bronze medal game
9	Quebec 1	4
7	British Columbia 1	6

5th/6th
1	Nova Scotia 2	6
7	Northern Ontario 1	8

			5th/6th
			3	Nova Scotia 1	6
8	Saskatchewan 2	2	5	New Brunswick 2	7
5	New Brunswick 2	6

==== B Bracket ====
			10th/11th
			10	Quebec 2	5
12	Northern Ontario 2	3	15	British Columbia 2	4
15	British Columbia 2	4

			10th/11th
			11	Ontario 1	6
13	Ontario 2	9	13	Ontario 2	5
14	New Brunswick 1	4

12th/13th
12	Northern Ontario 2	L
13	Ontario 2	W/O

12th/13th
14	New Brunswick 1	5
15	British Columbia 2	7

==== C Bracket ====
			16th/17th
			17	Saskatchewan 1	6
19	Manitoba 2	3	20	Prince Edward Island	4
20	Prince Edward Island	5

			16th/17th
			16	Manitoba 1	10
18	Northwest Territories	L	21	Newfoundland and Labrador	3
21	Newfoundland and Labrador	W/O

18th/19th
19	Manitoba 2	8
21	Newfoundland and Labrador	3

18th/19th
18	Northwest Territories	3
20	Prince Edward Island	7

=== Final standings ===
Place	Team
1st place, gold medalist(s)	Alberta 1
2nd place, silver medalist(s)	Alberta 2
3rd place, bronze medalist(s)	British Columbia 1
4	Quebec 1
5	New Brunswick 2
6	Northern Ontario 1
7	Nova Scotia 2
8	Nova Scotia 1
9	Saskatchewan 2
10	Quebec 2
11	Ontario 1
12	Ontario 2
13	British Columbia 2
14	Northern Ontario 2
15	New Brunswick 1
16	Manitoba 1
17	Saskatchewan 1
18	Manitoba 2
19	Prince Edward Island
20	Northwest Territories
21	Newfoundland and Labrador
