= Nicholas Codner =

Canadian curler

- Curler
- Born: March 23, 2006 (age 20); Torbay, Newfoundland

Team
- Curling club: RE/MAX Centre, St. John's, NL
- Skip: Simon Perry
- Third: Nicholas Codner
- Second: Brayden Snow
- Lead: Carter Holden

Curling career
- Member Association: Newfoundland and Labrador
- Brier: (2022)

Nicholas Codner (born March 23, 2006) is a Canadian curler from Torbay, Newfoundland and Labrador. He currently plays mate for the Team Simon Perry rink. He is known as the youngest person to ever compete in The Brier, when he played as an alternate for Nathan Young at the 2022 Tim Hortons Brier. He was 15.

== Career ==
=== Juniors ===
In 2020, the Simon Perry team won their first ever provincial championship in the U16 Newfoundland & Labrador Provincials. They were coached by Newfoundland & Labrador curler, Joel Krats.

Codner made his curling debut on the men's competitive scene in 2021 when the Simon Perry rink participated in the 2021 Newfoundland and Labrador Tankard. They ended up finishing in last place with a record of 0-7. Their closest loss was against the Trent Skanes rink where they lost by two points.

In 2022, Codner won the 2022 U18 Newfoundland & Labrador Curling Provincials. His rink went 6-0 through the round robin to secure themselves the provincial title. This qualified them for the 2022 Canadian U18 Curling Championships. They ended up finishing sixteenth overall at this tournament and finished the round robin with a record of 2-4. He also was the alternate for the Nathan Young in the 2022 Newfoundland and Labrador Tankard, where they won. This sent Codner off to the 2022 Tim Hortons Brier where he got to play, and become the youngest curler ever to play a game in the history of the Brier at the age of 15.

In 2023, Codner and his team won the U18 Newfoundland & Labrador Provincials once more. They beat the Parker Tipple rink in the finals with a score of 8–4 to send the team off to the 2023 Canadian U18 Curling Championships. At this tournament, they finished sixth overall and finished the round robin with a record of 4–2. This improved drastically on their results from the previous year. The Perry rink also continued this success into the U21 Newfoundland & Labrador provincial tournament. They beat the Nathan Young rink in the finals with a score of 9–1. This qualified them to be Team Newfoundland & Labrador 1 at the 2023 Canadian Junior Curling Championships, where they finished a disappointing 15th.

In 2024, Codner and the Perry rink won their first national championship at the 2024 Canadian U18 Curling Championships, beating Saskatchewan 5–4 in the final. This was also Newfoundland and Labrador's first U18 national championship title.

Codner and the Perry rink would compete in his last national Junior Championships at the 2026 Canadian Junior Curling Championships, where they would finish round robin play with a 6–2 record, however would fail to qualify for the playoffs due to head-to-head records with the other tied teams, finishing in 8th place.

=== Mixed doubles ===
Codner teamed up with Dominique Vivier from Ontario to compete in the 2025 Canadian Under-21 World Mixed Doubles Qualifier, where they won against the New Brunswick duo of Sierra Tracy and Noah Riggs 7–5 in the final, qualifying them to represent Canada at the 2025 World Junior Mixed Doubles Curling Championship, the first ever World Junior Mixed Doubles Championship. Codner and Vivier finished 4–2 after round robin play, failing to qualify for the playoffs and finishing in 12th place.

== Personal life ==
Codner is currently a student at Memorial University. Codner also used to race Bandolero cars at the Eastbound International Raceway.

== Teams ==
Season	Skip	Third	Second	Lead
2020-21	Simon Perry	Nicholas Codner	Carter Holden	Evan Scott
2021-22	Simon Perry	Nicholas Codner	William Butler	Evan Scott
2022-23	Simon Perry	Nicholas Codner	William Butler	Evan Scott
2023-24	Simon Perry	Nicholas Codner	Brayden Snow	Carter Holden
2024-25	Simon Perry	Nicholas Codner	Brayden Snow	Carter Holden
2025-26	Simon Perry	Nicholas Codner	Brayden Snow	Carter Holden
