= 2025 World Junior Mixed Doubles Curling Championship =

- Host city: Edmonton, Alberta, Canada
- Arena: Saville Community Sports Centre
- Dates: May 6–11
- Winner: Italy
- Female: Lucrezia Grande
- Male: Stefano Spiller
- Coach: Marco Mariani
- Finalist: Denmark (Schmidt / Schmidt)

The 2025 World Junior Mixed Doubles Curling Championship (branded as the 2025 Booster Juice World Junior Mixed Doubles Curling Championship for sponsorship reasons) was held from May 6 to 11 at the Saville Community Sports Centre in Edmonton, Alberta, Canada.

The format of the championship was held in a round-robin format with four groups. The top two teams in each group qualified for the quarterfinals. Teams were ranked 1 to 8 by comparing the DSCs of the teams with the same rank from each group.

== Teams ==
The teams are listed as follows:

Australia	Austria	Brazil	Canada
Female: Holly Douglas; Male: Charlie Ryan	Female: Emma Müller; Male: Gabriel Ferguson	Female: Melissa de Castro Sampaio; Male: Pedro Ribeiro Alves	Female: Dominique Vivier; Male: Nicholas Codner
China	Czech Republic	Denmark	England
Female: Li Ziru; Male: Wang Zhenhao	Female: Sofie Krupičková; Male: Ondřej Bláha	Female: Katrine Schmidt; Male: Jacob Schmidt	Female: Chloe McNaughton; Male: Matthew Waring
Germany	Hong Kong	Hungary	Italy
Female: Sara Messenzehl; Male: Felix Messenzehl	Female: Ka Chan; Male: Chung Cheuk-Hei	Female: Emma Szurmay; Male: Baján Kán Ferenci	Female: Lucrezia Grande; Male: Stefano Spiller
Japan	Kenya	Latvia	New Zealand
Female: Mikoto Nakajima; Male: Takeru Yamamoto	Female: Kyra Sheri Kemu; Male: Emmanuel Kinoti	Female: Katrīna Gaidule; Male: Roberts Reinis Buncis	Female: Ellie McKenzie; Male: Darcy Nevill
Nigeria	Norway	Poland	Romania
Female: Sheila Daniel; Male: Roy Daniel	Female: Nora Østgård; Male: Eskil Eriksen	Female: Julia Jawień; Male: Szymon Rokita	Female: Ania Bacali; Male: Tudor Pop
Scotland	Slovenia	South Korea	Spain
Female: Robyn Munro; Male: Orrin Carson	Female: Ema Kavčič; Male: Javor Brin Zelinka	Female: Kang Bo-bae; Male: Kim Hak-jun	Female: Paula Olivan Salvador; Male: Ismael Mingorance
Sweden	Switzerland	Turkey	Ukraine
Female: Moa Dryburgh; Male: Vilmer Nygren	Female: Elodie Tschudi; Male: Nathan Dryburgh	Female: Burcu Haşıl; Male: Muhammed Taha Zenit	Female: Diana Moskalenko; Male: Artem Suhak
United States			
Female: Heidi Holt; Male: Zachary Brenden			

== Round robin standings ==
Final Round Robin Standings

Key
Teams to Playoffs

Group A	Athletes	W	L	W–L	DSC
Italy	Lucrezia Grande / Stefano Spiller	6	0	–	17.76
Sweden	Moa Dryburgh / Vilmer Nygren	5	1	–	49.73
Norway	Nora Østgård / Eskil Eriksen	4	2	–	40.62
Poland	Julia Jawień / Szymon Rokita	3	3	–	86.21
Czech Republic	Sofie Krupičková / Ondřej Bláha	1	5	1–1	36.54
New Zealand	Ellie McKenzie / Darcy Nevill	1	5	1–1	57.20
Hong Kong	Ka Chan / Chung Cheuk-Hei	1	5	1–1	86.20

Group B	Athletes	W	L	W–L	DSC
Scotland	Robyn Munro / Orrin Carson	5	1	1–1	23.17
United States	Heidi Holt / Zachary Brenden	5	1	1–1	64.58
China	Li Ziru / Wang Zhenhao	5	1	1–1	67.17
Hungary	Emma Szurmay / Baján Kán Ferenci	3	3	–	80.35
Austria	Emma Müller / Gabriel Ferguson	2	4	–	72.12
Australia	Holly Douglas / Charlie Ryan	1	5	–	100.66
Brazil	Melissa de Castro Sampaio / Pedro Ribeiro Alves	0	6	–	99.12

Group C	Athletes	W	L	W–L	DSC
South Korea	Kang Bo-bae / Kim Hak-jun	5	1	1–0	54.46
Switzerland	Elodie Tschudi / Nathan Dryburgh	5	1	0–1	38.08
Canada	Dominique Vivier / Nicholas Codner	4	2	1–0	67.44
England	Chloe McNaughton / Matthew Waring	4	2	0–1	42.61
Ukraine	Diana Moskalenko / Artem Suhak	2	4	–	31.70
Turkey	Burcu Haşıl / Muhammed Taha Zenit	1	4	–	73.11
Romania	Ania Bacali / Tudor Pop	0	6	–	66.48

Group D	Athletes	W	L	W–L	DSC
Denmark	Katrine Schmidt / Jacob Schmidt	7	0	–	25.13
Germany	Sara Messenzehl / Felix Messenzehl	6	1	–	24.99
Japan	Mikoto Nakajima / Takeru Yamamoto	5	2	–	32.07
Latvia	Katrīna Gaidule / Roberts Reinis Buncis	4	3	–	45.80
Spain	Paula Olivan Salvador / Ismael Mingorance	3	4	–	64.35
Slovenia	Ema Kavčič / Javor Brin Zelinka	2	5	–	89.29
Nigeria	Sheila Daniel / Roy Daniel	1	6	–	174.31
Kenya	Kyra Sheri Kemu / Emmanuel Kinoti	0	7	–	182.73

Group A Round Robin Summary Table
Pos.	Country	Czech Republic	Hong Kong	Italy	New Zealand	Norway	Poland	Sweden	Record
5	Czech Republic	—	7–5	3–8	7–8	4–8	5–9	4–5	1–5
7	Hong Kong	5–7	—	1–13	8–5	3–10	5–15	4–10	1–5
1	Italy	8–3	13–1	—	11–2	11–10	12–2	8–7	6–0
6	New Zealand	8–7	5–8	2–11	—	4–10	3–13	4–9	1–5
3	Norway	8–4	10–3	10–11	10–4	—	5–4	6–7	4–2
4	Poland	9–5	15–5	2–12	13–3	4–5	—	6–9	3–3
2	Sweden	5–4	10–4	7–8	9–4	7–6	9–6	—	5–1

Group B Round Robin Summary Table
Pos.	Country	Australia	Austria	Brazil	China	Hungary	Scotland	United States	Record
6	Australia	—	5–9	13–3	0–13	7–11	1–10	2–14	1–5
5	Austria	9–5	—	8–3	L–W	5–7	2–9	7–12	2–4
7	Brazil	3–13	3–8	—	L–W	6–8	1–9	3–9	0–6
3	China	13–0	W–L	W–L	—	12–2	8–3	6–7	5–1
4	Hungary	11–7	7–5	8–6	2–12	—	7–13	5–6	3–3
1	Scotland	10–1	9–2	9–1	3–8	13–7	—	8–2	5–1
2	United States	14–2	12–7	9–3	7–6	6–5	2–8	—	5–1

Group C Round Robin Summary Table
Pos.	Country	Canada	England	Romania	South Korea	Switzerland	Turkey	Ukraine	Record
3	Canada	—	9–7	10–3	5–11	3–5	8–7	11–8	4–2
4	England	7–9	—	9–1	12–9	6–8	7–5	6–5	4–2
7	Romania	3–10	1–9	—	1–11	3–7	2–8	2–9	0–6
1	South Korea	11–5	9–12	11–1	—	10–8	10–7	6–5	5–1
2	Switzerland	5–3	8–6	7–3	8–10	—	8–3	7–6	5–1
6	Turkey	7–8	5–7	8–2	7–10	3–8	—	5–6	1–5
5	Ukraine	8–11	5–6	9–2	5–6	6–7	6–5	—	2–4

Group D Round Robin Summary Table
Pos.	Country	Denmark	Germany	Japan	Kenya	Latvia	Nigeria	Slovenia	Spain	Record
1	Denmark	—	6–5	8–5	18–1	10–8	17–0	9–1	7–5	7–0
2	Germany	5–6	—	8–5	18–0	11–2	21–0	12–1	10–1	6–1
3	Japan	5–8	5–8	—	17–0	8–5	18–2	10–3	6–5	5–2
8	Kenya	1–18	0–18	0–17	—	0–23	L–W	4–11	1–12	0–7
4	Latvia	8–10	2–11	5–8	23–0	—	21–0	11–3	11–3	4–3
7	Nigeria	0–17	0–21	2–18	W–L	0–21	—	1–13	0–13	1–6
6	Slovenia	1–9	1–12	3–10	11–4	3–11	13–1	—	3–12	2–5
5	Spain	5–7	1–10	5–6	12–1	3–11	13–0	12–3	—	3–4

== Round robin results ==
All draws times are listed in Mountain Time Zone (UTC−06:00).

=== Draw 1 ===
Tuesday, May 6, 10:00

Sheet A	1	2	3	4	5	6	7	8	Final
Ukraine 🔨	3	1	3	2	0	0	X	X	9
Romania	0	0	0	0	1	1	X	X	2

Sheet C	1	2	3	4	5	6	7	8	Final
Kenya	0	0	0	0	0	0	X	X	0
Latvia 🔨	6	4	2	3	4	4	X	X	23

Sheet E	1	2	3	4	5	6	7	8	Final
Slovenia 🔨	0	0	0	0	1	0	X	X	1
Denmark	2	1	2	2	0	2	X	X	9

Sheet B	1	2	3	4	5	6	7	8	Final
England	0	1	1	2	0	0	2	0	6
Switzerland 🔨	3	0	0	0	1	1	0	3	8

Sheet D	1	2	3	4	5	6	7	8	Final
Nigeria	0	0	0	0	0	0	X	X	0
Germany 🔨	6	5	2	3	4	1	X	X	21

Sheet F	1	2	3	4	5	6	7	8	Final
New Zealand	0	1	0	0	1	2	1	0	5
Hong Kong 🔨	2	0	4	1	0	0	0	1	8

=== Draw 2 ===
Tuesday, May 6, 14:00

Sheet A	1	2	3	4	5	6	7	8	Final
China 🔨	4	1	1	0	0	1	0		W
Brazil	0	0	0	2	1	0	1	/	L^

Sheet C	1	2	3	4	5	6	7	8	Final
Norway 🔨	2	0	1	0	1	0	2	0	6
Sweden	0	2	0	1	0	3	0	1	7

Sheet E	1	2	3	4	5	6	7	8	Final
Austria	0	0	0	0	1	1	0	X	2
Scotland 🔨	2	2	1	1	0	0	3	X	9

^Brazil ran out of time, and therefore forfeited the match.

Sheet B	1	2	3	4	5	6	7	8	Final
United States 🔨	3	3	1	0	2	0	5	X	14
Australia	0	0	0	1	0	1	0	X	2

Sheet D	1	2	3	4	5	6	7	8	Final
Poland	0	0	1	0	0	1	X	X	2
Italy 🔨	1	5	0	5	1	0	X	X	12

Sheet F	1	2	3	4	5	6	7	8	Final
Canada	0	0	1	0	4	0	0	X	5
South Korea 🔨	2	1	0	2	0	3	3	X	11

=== Draw 3 ===
Tuesday, May 6, 18:00

Sheet C	1	2	3	4	5	6	7	8	Final
Turkey 🔨	0	0	3	0	1	0	1	X	5
England	3	1	0	2	0	1	0	X	7

Sheet E	Final
Nigeria 🔨	W
Kenya	L

Sheet D	1	2	3	4	5	6	7	8	Final
Japan 🔨	2	4	2	0	2	0	X	X	10
Slovenia	0	0	0	1	0	2	X	X	3

Sheet F	1	2	3	4	5	6	7	8	Final
Spain	0	0	0	0	1	0	X	X	1
Germany 🔨	1	2	1	4	0	2	X	X	10

=== Draw 4 ===
Wednesday, May 7, 9:00

Sheet A	1	2	3	4	5	6	7	8	Final
Brazil 🔨	2	0	1	0	0	3	0	0	6
Hungary	0	1	0	2	2	0	2	1	8

Sheet C	1	2	3	4	5	6	7	8	Final
Sweden	0	1	0	2	0	2	2	0	7
Italy 🔨	1	0	2	0	4	0	0	1	8

Sheet E	1	2	3	4	5	6	7	8	Final
China 🔨	5	2	1	0					W
Austria	0	0	0	1	/				L^

^A player on Austria was injured during the fourth end, resulting in a forfeit.

Sheet B	1	2	3	4	5	6	7	8	Final
Australia	0	0	0	1	0	0	0	X	1
Scotland 🔨	2	1	2	0	1	1	3	X	10

Sheet D	1	2	3	4	5	6	7	8	Final
New Zealand 🔨	0	0	0	2	0	1	0	X	3
Poland	2	4	2	0	1	0	4	X	13

Sheet F	1	2	3	4	5	6	7	8	Final
Hong Kong 🔨	2	0	0	0	2	0	1	0	5
Czech Republic	0	3	1	1	0	1	0	1	7

=== Draw 5 ===
Wednesday, May 7, 12:30

Sheet A	1	2	3	4	5	6	7	8	Final
Japan	0	0	0	3	1	0	1	0	5
Denmark 🔨	2	2	1	0	0	1	0	2	8

Sheet C	1	2	3	4	5	6	7	8	Final
Latvia	0	2	0	0	0	0	X	X	2
Germany 🔨	5	0	3	1	1	1	X	X	11

Sheet E	1	2	3	4	5	6	7	8	Final
England	1	0	2	0	2	0	0	1	6
Ukraine 🔨	0	1	0	1	0	2	1	0	5

Sheet B	1	2	3	4	5	6	7	8	Final
Slovenia	0	0	3	0	0	0	0	X	3
Spain 🔨	1	2	0	3	2	1	3	X	12

Sheet D	1	2	3	4	5	6	7	8	Final
Canada	4	2	1	0	1	0	2	X	10
Romania 🔨	0	0	0	2	0	1	0	X	3

Sheet F	1	2	3	4	5	6	7	8	Final
Turkey	0	1	1	0	1	0	0	X	3
Switzerland 🔨	2	0	0	1	0	2	3	X	8

=== Draw 6 ===
Wednesday, May 7, 16:00

Sheet A	1	2	3	4	5	6	7	8	Final
Norway 🔨	0	0	2	0	1	1	0	1	5
Poland	1	1	0	1	0	0	1	0	4

Sheet C	1	2	3	4	5	6	7	8	Final
United States 🔨	1	0	4	2	2	0	X	X	9
Brazil	0	1	0	0	0	2	X	X	3

Sheet E	1	2	3	4	5	6	7	8	Final
Italy 🔨	5	1	2	2	0	3	X	X	13
Hong Kong	0	0	0	0	1	0	X	X	1

Sheet B	1	2	3	4	5	6	7	8	Final
Czech Republic	1	0	1	0	1	0	1	0	4
Sweden 🔨	0	1	0	1	0	2	0	1	5

Sheet D	1	2	3	4	5	6	7	8	Final
Austria	0	1	0	3	0	1	0	0	5
Hungary 🔨	1	0	1	0	2	0	1	2	7

Sheet F	1	2	3	4	5	6	7	8	Final
Australia	0	0	0	0	0	0	X	X	0
China 🔨	3	3	2	1	2	2	X	X	13

=== Draw 7 ===
Wednesday, May 7, 19:30

Sheet A	1	2	3	4	5	6	7	8	Final
Slovenia 🔨	1	1	1	0	6	4	X	X	13
Nigeria	0	0	0	1	0	0	X	X	1

Sheet C	1	2	3	4	5	6	7	8	9	Final
South Korea 🔨	2	1	0	1	0	1	0	0	1	6
Ukraine	0	0	2	0	1	0	1	1	0	5

Sheet E	1	2	3	4	5	6	7	8	Final
Romania	1	0	1	0	0	0	0	X	2
Turkey 🔨	0	1	0	1	2	2	2	X	8

Sheet B	1	2	3	4	5	6	7	8	Final
Germany	0	0	0	1	0	4	2	1	8
Japan 🔨	1	2	1	0	1	0	0	0	5

Sheet D	1	2	3	4	5	6	7	8	Final
Kenya	0	0	0	0	1	0	X	X	1
Spain 🔨	4	1	1	2	0	4	X	X	12

=== Draw 8 ===
Thursday, May 8, 10:00

Sheet A	1	2	3	4	5	6	7	8	Final
Kenya	1	0	1	0	2	0	0	X	4
Slovenia 🔨	0	4	0	2	0	1	4	X	11

Sheet C	1	2	3	4	5	6	7	8	Final
Denmark 🔨	0	0	0	1	0	3	1	2	7
Spain	1	1	1	0	2	0	0	0	5

Sheet E	1	2	3	4	5	6	7	8	Final
Brazil 🔨	0	0	1	0	2	0	X	X	3
Australia	1	2	0	5	0	5	X	X	13

Sheet B	1	2	3	4	5	6	7	8	Final
Latvia 🔨	6	2	5	5	1	2	X	X	21
Nigeria	0	0	0	0	0	0	X	X	0

Sheet D	1	2	3	4	5	6	7	8	Final
Switzerland 🔨	0	1	1	0	3	0	2	0	7
Ukraine	1	0	0	1	0	3	0	1	6

Sheet F	1	2	3	4	5	6	7	8	9	Final
South Korea	0	2	0	4	0	2	0	1	0	9
England 🔨	2	0	1	0	5	0	1	0	3	12

=== Draw 9 ===
Thursday, May 8, 14:00

Sheet B	1	2	3	4	5	6	7	8	Final
Italy 🔨	4	0	5	0	1	1	X	X	11
New Zealand	0	1	0	1	0	0	X	X	2

Sheet D	1	2	3	4	5	6	7	8	Final
Czech Republic	1	0	1	1	0	1	0	X	4
Norway 🔨	0	1	0	0	3	0	4	X	8

Sheet F	1	2	3	4	5	6	7	8	Final
Poland	0	0	4	0	1	0	1	X	6
Sweden 🔨	3	2	0	3	0	1	0	X	9

Sheet C	1	2	3	4	5	6	7	8	Final
Scotland	0	1	0	1	0	1	X	X	3
China 🔨	2	0	3	0	3	0	X	X	8

Sheet E	1	2	3	4	5	6	7	8	Final
United States 🔨	0	2	1	0	1	1	1	0	6
Hungary	1	0	0	3	0	0	0	1	5

=== Draw 10 ===
Thursday, May 8, 18:00

Sheet A	1	2	3	4	5	6	7	8	Final
Australia	0	1	0	2	2	0	0	X	5
Austria 🔨	5	0	2	0	0	1	1	X	9

Sheet C	1	2	3	4	5	6	7	8	Final
Canada 🔨	0	0	3	0	0	4	0	1	8
Turkey	1	1	0	2	1	0	2	0	7

Sheet E	1	2	3	4	5	6	7	8	Final
Kenya	0	0	0	0	0	0	X	X	0
Germany 🔨	4	4	2	2	4	2	X	X	18

Sheet B	1	2	3	4	5	6	7	8	Final
South Korea 🔨	4	1	1	2	3	0	X	X	11
Romania	0	0	0	0	0	1	X	X	1

Sheet D	1	2	3	4	5	6	7	8	Final
Latvia 🔨	1	0	0	2	0	1	0	1	5
Japan	0	1	2	0	3	0	2	0	8

Sheet F	1	2	3	4	5	6	7	8	Final
Nigeria	0	0	0	0	0	0	X	X	0
Denmark 🔨	4	3	1	1	5	3	X	X	17

=== Draw 11 ===
Friday, May 9, 9:00

Sheet A	1	2	3	4	5	6	7	8	Final
Czech Republic	1	0	0	2	0	0	X	X	3
Italy 🔨	0	3	2	0	2	1	X	X	8

Sheet C	1	2	3	4	5	6	7	8	Final
Hong Kong 🔨	0	0	1	0	4	0	X	X	5
Poland	2	2	0	5	0	6	X	X	15

Sheet E	1	2	3	4	5	6	7	8	Final
Norway	2	2	1	0	4	0	1	X	10
New Zealand 🔨	0	0	0	1	0	3	0	X	4

Sheet B	1	2	3	4	5	6	7	8	Final
Brazil	0	0	0	1	1	0	1	X	3
Austria 🔨	1	2	1	0	0	4	0	X	8

Sheet D	1	2	3	4	5	6	7	8	Final
China 🔨	1	0	3	0	0	2	0	0	6
United States	0	1	0	1	2	0	1	2	7

Sheet F	1	2	3	4	5	6	7	8	Final
Hungary	0	2	0	3	0	2	0	X	7
Scotland 🔨	2	0	6	0	4	0	1	X	13

=== Draw 12 ===
Friday, May 9, 12:30

Sheet A	1	2	3	4	5	6	7	8	Final
England 🔨	4	1	0	1	0	0	1	0	7
Canada	0	0	1	0	4	1	0	3	9

Sheet C	1	2	3	4	5	6	7	8	Final
Romania	0	0	1	0	0	1	1	X	3
Switzerland 🔨	1	1	0	2	3	0	0	X	7

Sheet E	1	2	3	4	5	6	7	8	Final
Spain	0	0	0	2	1	0	1	1	5
Japan 🔨	1	1	2	0	0	2	0	0	6

Sheet B	1	2	3	4	5	6	7	8	Final
Ukraine 🔨	0	2	0	1	0	1	1	1	6
Turkey	1	0	3	0	1	0	0	0	5

Sheet D	1	2	3	4	5	6	7	8	Final
Germany 🔨	1	0	0	3	0	0	0	1	5
Denmark	0	1	1	0	1	2	1	0	6

Sheet F	1	2	3	4	5	6	7	8	Final
Slovenia	0	0	0	3	0	0	0	X	3
Latvia 🔨	2	2	1	0	3	3	X	X	11

=== Draw 13 ===
Friday, May 9, 16:00

Sheet A	1	2	3	4	5	6	7	8	Final
Sweden 🔨	1	2	0	1	0	5	0	X	9
New Zealand	0	0	2	0	1	0	1	X	4

Sheet C	1	2	3	4	5	6	7	8	Final
Hungary	0	0	3	0	5	0	3	X	11
Australia 🔨	2	1	0	2	0	2	0	X	7

Sheet E	1	2	3	4	5	6	7	8	Final
Poland	0	1	0	1	3	0	2	2	9
Czech Republic 🔨	1	0	1	0	0	3	0	0	5

Sheet B	1	2	3	4	5	6	7	8	Final
Hong Kong	0	0	0	2	0	1	0	X	3
Norway 🔨	2	3	3	0	1	0	1	X	10

Sheet D	1	2	3	4	5	6	7	8	Final
Scotland 🔨	0	2	2	3	1	1	X	X	9
Brazil	1	0	0	0	0	0	X	X	1

Sheet F	1	2	3	4	5	6	7	8	Final
Austria	0	1	0	3	0	3	0	X	7
United States 🔨	1	0	4	0	4	0	3	X	12

=== Draw 14 ===
Friday, May 9, 19:30

Sheet A	1	2	3	4	5	6	7	8	Final
Spain 🔨	0	0	0	1	2	0	X	X	3
Latvia	3	4	1	0	0	3	X	X	11

Sheet C	1	2	3	4	5	6	7	8	Final
Japan 🔨	5	0	6	3	2	2	X	X	18
Nigeria	0	2	0	0	0	0	X	X	2

Sheet E	1	2	3	4	5	6	7	8	Final
Switzerland 🔨	1	0	3	0	3	0	1	0	8
South Korea	0	5	0	3	0	1	0	1	10

Sheet B	1	2	3	4	5	6	7	8	Final
Denmark 🔨	0	6	4	3	3	2	X	X	18
Kenya	1	0	0	0	0	0	X	X	1

Sheet D	1	2	3	4	5	6	7	8	Final
Romania	0	0	0	0	1	0	0	X	1
England 🔨	3	1	1	1	0	2	1	X	9

Sheet F	1	2	3	4	5	6	7	8	Final
Ukraine 🔨	5	0	0	2	0	0	1	0	8
Canada	0	5	1	0	1	2	0	2	11

=== Draw 15 ===
Saturday, May 10, 9:00

Sheet A	1	2	3	4	5	6	7	8	Final
Scotland 🔨	1	3	2	1	1	0	X	X	8
United States	0	0	0	0	0	2	X	X	2

Sheet C	1	2	3	4	5	6	7	8	Final
New Zealand	0	1	0	3	0	2	0	2	8
Czech Republic 🔨	2	0	1	0	3	0	1	0	7

Sheet F	1	2	3	4	5	6	7	8	9	Final
Italy 🔨	1	0	2	2	0	4	0	1	1	11
Norway	0	3	0	0	5	0	2	0	0	10

Sheet B	1	2	3	4	5	6	7	8	Final
Hungary 🔨	0	0	1	0	1	0	X	X	2
China	2	1	0	4	0	5	X	X	12

Sheet D	1	2	3	4	5	6	7	8	Final
Sweden 🔨	2	0	3	2	3	0	X	X	10
Hong Kong	0	3	0	0	0	1	X	X	4

=== Draw 16 ===
Saturday, May 10, 12:30

Sheet A	1	2	3	4	5	6	7	8	9	Final
Turkey	1	0	1	0	1	3	0	1	0	7
South Korea 🔨	0	2	0	3	0	0	2	0	3	10

Sheet C	1	2	3	4	5	6	7	8	Final
Germany 🔨	2	1	4	2	0	3	X	X	12
Slovenia	0	0	0	0	1	0	X	X	1

Sheet E	1	2	3	4	5	6	7	8	Final
Denmark	0	2	0	2	1	0	3	2	10
Latvia 🔨	4	0	2	0	0	2	0	0	8

Sheet B	1	2	3	4	5	6	7	8	Final
Switzerland 🔨	1	2	0	0	0	1	0	1	5
Canada	0	0	1	0	1	0	1	0	3

Sheet D	1	2	3	4	5	6	7	8	Final
Spain 🔨	3	4	2	1	2	1	X	X	13
Nigeria	0	0	0	0	0	0	X	X	0

Sheet F	1	2	3	4	5	6	7	8	Final
Japan 🔨	2	5	1	3	3	3	X	X	17
Kenya	0	0	0	0	0	0	X	X	0

== Playoffs ==
Quarterfinals
1	Italy	8
8	United States	1
4	South Korea	7
5	Germany	6
3	Denmark	8
6	Switzerland	5
2	Scotland	6
7	Sweden	7

Semifinals
1	Italy	9
4	South Korea	1
3	Denmark	9
7	Sweden	8

Final
1	Italy	8
3	Denmark	2
Bronze medal game
4	South Korea	6
7	Sweden	5

=== Quarterfinals ===
Saturday, May 10, 18:00

Sheet B	1	2	3	4	5	6	7	8	Final
Italy 🔨	1	2	1	0	3	1	X	X	8
United States	0	0	0	1	0	0	X	X	1

Sheet C	1	2	3	4	5	6	7	8	9	Final
South Korea 🔨	1	2	0	0	2	0	1	0	1	7
Germany	0	0	1	2	0	2	0	1	0	6

Sheet D	1	2	3	4	5	6	7	8	Final
Scotland 🔨	0	1	0	0	2	0	2	1	6
Sweden	1	0	2	2	0	2	0	0	7

Sheet E	1	2	3	4	5	6	7	8	9	Final
Denmark	0	1	1	1	0	0	2	0	3	8
Switzerland 🔨	1	0	0	0	1	1	0	2	0	5

=== Semifinals ===
Sunday, May 11, 10:00

Sheet C	1	2	3	4	5	6	7	8	Final
Denmark	1	2	3	0	0	0	3	0	9
Sweden 🔨	0	0	0	3	1	1	0	3	8

Sheet E	1	2	3	4	5	6	7	8	Final
Italy 🔨	2	2	2	2	1	0	X	X	9
South Korea	0	0	0	0	0	1	X	X	1

=== Bronze medal game ===
Sunday, May 11, 15:00

Sheet D	1	2	3	4	5	6	7	8	Final
South Korea 🔨	1	0	2	0	2	0	1	0	6
Sweden	0	1	0	1	0	2	0	1	5

=== Final ===
Sunday, May 11, 15:00

Sheet B	1	2	3	4	5	6	7	8	Final
Italy	0	1	1	2	0	1	3	X	8
Denmark 🔨	1	0	0	0	1	0	0	X	2

== Final standings ==
Place	Team
1st place, gold medalist(s)	Italy
2nd place, silver medalist(s)	Denmark
3rd place, bronze medalist(s)	South Korea
4	Sweden
5	Germany
5	Scotland
5	Switzerland
5	United States
9	Japan
10	Norway
11	China
12	Canada
13	England
14	Latvia
15	Hungary
16	Poland
17	Ukraine
18	Czech Republic
19	Spain
20	Austria
21	New Zealand
22	Turkey
23	Slovenia
24	Australia
25	Romania
26	Hong Kong
27	Brazil
28	Nigeria
29	Kenya
