= 2003 Ontario Scott Tournament of Hearts =

- Host city: Mississauga, Ontario
- Arena: Hershey Centre
- Dates: January 25–February 2, 2003
- Winner: Team Dunn
- Curling club: Galt CC, Cambridge, Ontario
- Skip: Anne Dunn
- Third: Lindy Marchuk
- Second: Gloria Campbell
- Lead: Fran Todd
- Finalist: Darcie Simpson

The 2003 Ontario Scott Tournament of Hearts, the provincial women's championship in Ontario was held January 25-February 2 at the Hershey Centre in Mississauga. The Anne Dunn rink from Cambridge, Ontario won the event. She and her rink of Lindy Marchuk, Gloria Campbell and Fran Todd would go on to represent Ontario at the 2003 Scott Tournament of Hearts. The event was held in conjunction with the 2003 Ontario Nokia Cup, the Ontario men's curling championship.

== Standings ==
Final standings:

Skip	W	L
Anne Merklinger (Rideau)	9	0
Anne Dunn (Galt)	7	2
Darcie Simpson (Rideau)	6	3
Tara George (Fort William)	5	4
Jo-Ann Rizzo (Brant)	5	4
Chrissy Cadorin (Orangeville)	3	6
Christine Eby (Port Arthur)	3	6
Elaine Uhryn (Soo)	3	6
Kathy Brown (Sutton)	2	7
Val MacInnes (McIntyre)	2	7

== Tie breaker ==
- George 8-6 Rizzo

== Playoffs ==
Page playoff system
1	Anne Merklinger	6
2	Anne Dunn	7
3	Darcie Simpson	7
4	Tara George	5

Semifinal
1	Anne Merklinger	6
3	Darcie Simpson	8

Final
2	Anne Dunn	5
3	Darcie Simpson	2
