= 2002 Canadian Senior Curling Championships =

- Host city: St. Thomas, Ontario
- Arena: St. Thomas Curling Club
- Dates: February 2–10, 2002
- Men's winner: Manitoba
- Skip: Carl German
- Third: Ray Fillion
- Second: Ray McDougall
- Lead: Brian Copeland
- Finalist: Ontario
- Women's winner: Ontario
- Skip: Anne Dunn
- Third: Lindy Marchuk
- Second: Gloria Campbell
- Lead: Carol Thompson
- Finalist: Alberta

The 2002 Canadian Senior Curling Championships were held from February 2 to 10 at the St. Thomas Curling Club in St. Thomas, Ontario.

== Men's ==
=== Teams ===
Province / Territory	Skip	Third	Second	Lead
Alberta	Orville MacDonald	Dale Josvanger	Terry Brady	Bill Callas
British Columbia	Jamie McTavish	Steven Thorson	Stephen Lambert	Pierre Gallant
Manitoba	Carl German	Ray Fillion	Ray McDougall	Brian Copeland
New Brunswick	David Sullivan	Charlie Sullivan Sr.	Thomas Rubec	Kenneth Smith
Newfoundland and Labrador	Bas Buckle	Bob Freeman	Gerry Young	Harvey Holloway
Northern Ontario	Bill Johnston	Don Sauve	Ron McCuaig	Tom McGrory
Nova Scotia	Haylett Clarke	Bill MacLeod	Vic Belliveau	Peter Grant
Ontario	Bob Fedosa	David Stewart	Greg Ward	Bob Haw
Prince Edward Island	Ted MacFadyen	Barrie Stevenson	John McKay	Mike Coady
Quebec	Mike Carson	Roger Perron	Jean-Luc Fortier	Jacquelin Lemieux
Saskatchewan	Eugene Hritzuk	Larry Ruf	Dan Greschuk	Garry Craig
Yukon/Northwest Territories	Chuck Haines	Craig Tuton	George Wilson	Gary Chapman

=== Standings ===
Locale	Skip	W	L
Manitoba	Carl German	10	1
Saskatchewan	Eugene Hritzuk	9	2
Ontario	Bob Fedosa	8	3
British Columbia	Jamie McTavish	7	4
Quebec	Mike Carson	6	5
New Brunswick	David Sullivan	6	5
Prince Edward Island	Ted MacFadyen	5	6
Alberta	Orville MacDonald	4	7
Northern Ontario	Bill Johnston	3	8
Newfoundland and Labrador	Bas Buckle	3	8
Nova Scotia	Haylett Clarke	3	8
Yukon/Northwest Territories	Chuck Haines	2	9

=== Results ===
==== Draw 1 ====
Sheet B	1	2	3	4	5	6	7	8	9	10	Final
New Brunswick (Sullivan)	0	0	1	2	1	0	2	0	0	0	6
Nova Scotia (Clarke) 🔨	0	1	0	0	0	1	0	1	1	1	5

Sheet D	1	2	3	4	5	6	7	8	9	10	Final
Prince Edward Island (MacFadyen) 🔨	1	0	2	2	0	0	2	0	0	2	9
British Columbia (McTavish)	0	1	0	0	4	0	0	1	1	0	7

Sheet F	1	2	3	4	5	6	7	8	9	10	Final
Ontario (Fedosa) 🔨	1	0	1	2	1	5	X	X	X	X	10
Alberta (MacDonald)	0	1	0	0	0	0	X	X	X	X	1

==== Draw 2 ====
Sheet B	1	2	3	4	5	6	7	8	9	10	Final
Saskatchewan (Hritzuk)	0	0	0	2	0	2	0	0	0	X	4
Manitoba (German) 🔨	2	1	1	0	1	0	1	0	1	X	7

Sheet D	1	2	3	4	5	6	7	8	9	10	Final
Northern Ontario (Johnston) 🔨	2	0	4	0	1	0	0	4	X	X	11
Newfoundland and Labrador (Buckle)	0	1	0	4	0	0	1	0	X	X	6

Sheet F	1	2	3	4	5	6	7	8	9	10	11	Final
Yukon/Northwest Territories (Haines)	0	2	1	0	0	0	2	0	1	0	0	6
Quebec (Carson) 🔨	0	0	0	3	1	2	0	0	0	0	1	7

==== Draw 3 ====
Sheet A	1	2	3	4	5	6	7	8	9	10	Final
Nova Scotia (Clarke) 🔨	1	0	1	1	0	1	1	2	0	0	7
Alberta (MacDonald)	0	2	0	0	0	0	0	0	1	3	6

Sheet C	1	2	3	4	5	6	7	8	9	10	Final
Prince Edward Island (MacFadyen) 🔨	0	1	0	1	1	0	2	0	0	0	5
Ontario (Fedosa)	0	0	2	0	0	2	0	1	1	1	7

Sheet E	1	2	3	4	5	6	7	8	9	10	Final
British Columbia (McTavish) 🔨	1	0	0	1	2	1	0	1	0	1	7
New Brunswick (Sullivan)	0	2	0	0	0	0	2	0	2	0	6

==== Draw 4 ====
Sheet A	1	2	3	4	5	6	7	8	9	10	Final
Newfoundland and Labrador (Buckle) 🔨	2	0	1	0	0	0	0	0	0	X	3
Quebec (Carson)	0	1	0	0	2	1	0	1	1	X	6

Sheet C	1	2	3	4	5	6	7	8	9	10	Final
Saskatchewan (Hritzuk) 🔨	2	0	0	1	0	2	0	0	0	1	6
Yukon/Northwest Territories (Haines)	0	1	1	0	1	0	0	1	0	0	4

Sheet E	1	2	3	4	5	6	7	8	9	10	Final
Manitoba (German) 🔨	3	0	1	0	2	0	2	0	1	X	9
Northern Ontario (Johnston)	0	1	0	0	0	3	0	1	0	X	5

==== Draw 5 ====
Sheet B	1	2	3	4	5	6	7	8	9	10	Final
Quebec (Carson) 🔨	1	0	0	1	1	0	1	0	2	0	6
Saskatchewan (Hritzuk)	0	2	0	0	0	2	0	2	0	1	7

Sheet D	1	2	3	4	5	6	7	8	9	10	11	Final
Yukon/Northwest Territories (Haines) 🔨	0	1	0	1	0	1	0	0	1	0	2	6
Northern Ontario (Johnston)	0	0	1	0	0	0	1	1	0	1	0	4

Sheet F	1	2	3	4	5	6	7	8	9	10	Final
Newfoundland and Labrador (Buckle) 🔨	1	0	0	0	0	1	0	0	X	X	2
Manitoba (German)	0	2	0	0	1	0	0	4	X	X	7

==== Draw 6 ====
Sheet B	1	2	3	4	5	6	7	8	9	10	11	Final
Alberta (MacDonald) 🔨	1	0	2	0	2	0	0	1	1	0	0	7
Prince Edward Island (MacFadyen)	0	1	0	2	0	2	1	0	0	1	2	9

Sheet D	1	2	3	4	5	6	7	8	9	10	Final
Nova Scotia (Clarke) 🔨	0	0	1	0	0	1	0	0	X	X	2
British Columbia (McTavish)	0	0	0	0	2	0	2	3	X	X	7

Sheet F	1	2	3	4	5	6	7	8	9	10	Final
Ontario (Fedosa) 🔨	0	3	0	1	2	0	0	2	0	X	8
New Brunswick (Sullivan)	2	0	1	0	0	1	0	0	2	X	6

==== Draw 7 ====
Sheet A	1	2	3	4	5	6	7	8	9	10	11	Final
Manitoba (German) 🔨	2	0	1	0	0	2	1	1	0	1	0	8
Yukon/Northwest Territories (Haines)	0	2	0	2	0	0	0	0	4	0	1	9

Sheet C	1	2	3	4	5	6	7	8	9	10	Final
Northern Ontario (Johnston) 🔨	0	0	1	0	0	0	1	0	X	X	2
Quebec (Carson)	0	1	0	0	2	1	0	4	X	X	8

Sheet E	1	2	3	4	5	6	7	8	9	10	Final
Saskatchewan (Hritzuk) 🔨	1	1	0	0	3	0	2	0	0	1	8
Newfoundland and Labrador (Buckle)	0	0	1	0	0	4	0	1	0	0	6

==== Draw 8 ====
Sheet A	1	2	3	4	5	6	7	8	9	10	Final
British Columbia (McTavish) 🔨	1	0	0	3	0	0	2	0	0	0	6
Ontario (Fedosa)	0	0	1	0	1	0	0	2	3	3	10

Sheet C	1	2	3	4	5	6	7	8	9	10	Final
Prince Edward Island (MacFadyen) 🔨	0	1	0	1	1	1	0	1	0	0	5
Nova Scotia (Clarke)	1	0	1	0	0	0	1	0	1	2	6

Sheet E	1	2	3	4	5	6	7	8	9	10	Final
New Brunswick (Sullivan) 🔨	1	0	1	1	1	1	0	1	0	1	7
Alberta (MacDonald)	0	2	0	0	0	0	2	0	1	0	5

==== Draw 9 ====
Sheet A	1	2	3	4	5	6	7	8	9	10	Final
New Brunswick (Sullivan) 🔨	0	1	0	0	1	0	0	1	1	1	5
Prince Edward Island (MacFadyen)	1	0	0	2	0	0	1	0	0	0	4

Sheet C	1	2	3	4	5	6	7	8	9	10	Final
Alberta (MacDonald) 🔨	1	0	2	3	0	2	0	0	2	0	10
British Columbia (McTavish)	0	1	0	0	3	0	3	1	0	3	11

Sheet E	1	2	3	4	5	6	7	8	9	10	Final
Ontario (Fedosa) 🔨	0	2	0	0	1	1	0	2	X	X	6
Nova Scotia (Clarke)	0	0	1	0	0	0	1	0	X	X	2

==== Draw 10 ====
Sheet A	1	2	3	4	5	6	7	8	9	10	Final
Northern Ontario (Johnston) 🔨	1	0	0	0	0	0	0	X	X	X	1
Saskatchewan (Hritzuk)	0	0	0	5	1	1	4	X	X	X	11

Sheet C	1	2	3	4	5	6	7	8	9	10	Final
Quebec (Carson) 🔨	0	0	1	0	1	0	2	0	X	X	4
Manitoba (German)	3	1	0	1	0	3	0	2	X	X	10

Sheet E	1	2	3	4	5	6	7	8	9	10	Final
Yukon/Northwest Territories (Haines) 🔨	1	0	1	0	1	0	0	1	0	X	4
Newfoundland and Labrador (Buckle)	0	2	0	1	0	1	3	0	1	X	8

==== Draw 11 ====
Sheet A	1	2	3	4	5	6	7	8	9	10	Final
New Brunswick (Sullivan) 🔨	0	0	1	0	1	0	2	0	0	0	4
Saskatchewan (Hritzuk)	0	0	0	1	0	1	0	1	2	1	6

Sheet B	1	2	3	4	5	6	7	8	9	10	Final
Nova Scotia (Clarke) 🔨	0	0	1	1	0	0	0	3	2	X	7
Yukon/Northwest Territories (Haines)	1	0	0	0	1	1	0	0	0	X	3

Sheet C	1	2	3	4	5	6	7	8	9	10	Final
British Columbia (McTavish) 🔨	1	0	0	1	0	0	2	2	2	X	8
Newfoundland and Labrador (Buckle)	0	0	0	0	1	0	0	0	0	X	1

Sheet D	1	2	3	4	5	6	7	8	9	10	Final
Ontario (Fedosa) 🔨	2	0	1	0	1	0	0	2	0	1	7
Quebec (Carson)	0	1	0	1	0	2	1	0	1	0	6

Sheet E	1	2	3	4	5	6	7	8	9	10	Final
Prince Edward Island (MacFadyen) 🔨	0	0	1	0	1	0	1	0	3	0	6
Manitoba (German)	0	1	0	0	0	2	0	3	0	2	8

Sheet F	1	2	3	4	5	6	7	8	9	10	Final
Alberta (Macdonald) 🔨	0	0	1	2	0	2	2	0	2	X	9
Northern Ontario (Johnston)	0	0	0	0	1	0	0	3	0	X	4

==== Draw 13 ====
Sheet A	1	2	3	4	5	6	7	8	9	10	Final
Yukon/Northwest Territories (Haines) 🔨	1	0	1	0	0	0	0	1	0	X	3
Ontario (Fedosa)	0	1	0	1	0	2	0	0	1	X	5

Sheet B	1	2	3	4	5	6	7	8	9	10	Final
Saskatchewan (Hritzuk) 🔨	0	0	0	4	0	2	0	0	0	2	8
Prince Edward Island (MacFadyen)	0	1	0	0	3	0	2	0	1	0	7

Sheet C	1	2	3	4	5	6	7	8	9	10	Final
Northern Ontario (Johnston) 🔨	1	0	1	0	2	0	1	0	0	X	5
New Brunswick (Sullivan)	0	1	0	2	0	1	0	1	3	X	8

Sheet D	1	2	3	4	5	6	7	8	9	10	Final
Newfoundland and Labrador (Buckle) 🔨	1	0	1	0	0	2	0	3	2	X	9
Nova Scotia (Clarke)	0	1	0	1	1	0	1	0	0	X	4

Sheet E	1	2	3	4	5	6	7	8	9	10	Final
Quebec (Carson) 🔨	0	1	0	0	0	1	0	0	X	X	2
Alberta (MacDonald)	0	0	1	1	1	0	3	3	X	X	9

Sheet F	1	2	3	4	5	6	7	8	9	10	Final
Manitoba (German) 🔨	1	0	1	0	1	1	2	1	X	X	7
British Columbia (McTavish)	0	1	0	1	0	0	0	0	X	X	2

==== Draw 15 ====
Sheet A	1	2	3	4	5	6	7	8	9	10	Final
Manitoba (German) 🔨	2	0	1	0	1	1	1	0	0	1	7
Alberta (MacDonald)	0	2	0	2	0	0	0	2	0	0	6

Sheet B	1	2	3	4	5	6	7	8	9	10	Final
Quebec (Carson) 🔨	1	1	0	0	0	2	0	4	0	0	8
British Columbia (McTavish)	0	0	1	1	0	0	1	0	3	1	7

Sheet C	1	2	3	4	5	6	7	8	9	10	Final
Saskatchewan (Hritzuk) 🔨	2	1	1	4	0	1	X	X	X	X	9
Ontario (Fedosa)	0	0	0	0	1	0	X	X	X	X	2

Sheet D	1	2	3	4	5	6	7	8	9	10	Final
Newfoundland and Labrador (Buckle) 🔨	0	2	0	1	0	1	0	0	0	X	4
New Brunswick (Sullivan)	1	0	2	0	1	0	0	2	2	X	8

Sheet E	1	2	3	4	5	6	7	8	9	10	11	Final
Northern Ontario (Johnston) 🔨	2	1	0	1	0	0	1	1	0	1	1	8
Nova Scotia (Clarke)	0	0	2	0	1	2	0	0	2	0	0	7

Sheet F	1	2	3	4	5	6	7	8	9	10	Final
Yukon/Northwest Territories (Haines) 🔨	1	0	0	0	1	0	X	X	X	X	2
Prince Edward Island (MacFadyen)	0	4	2	1	0	2	X	X	X	X	9

==== Draw 17 ====
Sheet A	1	2	3	4	5	6	7	8	9	10	Final
British Columbia (McTavish) 🔨	2	0	2	0	3	0	0	1	2	X	10
Northern Ontario (Johnston)	0	1	0	1	0	2	1	0	0	X	5

Sheet B	1	2	3	4	5	6	7	8	9	10	Final
New Brunswick (Sullivan) 🔨	3	0	1	0	0	3	3	X	X	X	10
Yukon/Northwest Territories (Haines)	0	1	0	0	2	0	0	X	X	X	3

Sheet C	1	2	3	4	5	6	7	8	9	10	Final
Alberta (MacDonald) 🔨	0	2	0	1	0	0	2	0	1	1	7
Newfoundland and Labrador (Buckle)	1	0	1	0	0	2	0	1	0	0	5

Sheet D	1	2	3	4	5	6	7	8	9	10	Final
Ontario (Fedosa) 🔨	1	0	0	0	0	0	1	1	X	X	3
Manitoba (German)	0	4	0	1	2	1	0	0	X	X	8

Sheet E	1	2	3	4	5	6	7	8	9	10	Final
Prince Edward Island (MacFadyen) 🔨	0	0	1	0	1	1	0	1	0	1	5
Quebec (Carson)	0	1	0	1	0	0	1	0	1	0	4

Sheet F	1	2	3	4	5	6	7	8	9	10	Final
Nova Scotia (Clarke) 🔨	1	0	0	0	1	0	2	0	X	X	4
Saskatchewan (Hritzuk)	0	2	1	2	0	2	0	3	X	X	10

==== Draw 19 ====
Sheet A	1	2	3	4	5	6	7	8	9	10	Final
Prince Edward Island (MacFadyen) 🔨	1	0	1	0	0	0	1	0	1	X	4
Newfoundland and Labrador (Buckle)	0	4	0	0	0	2	0	1	0	X	7

Sheet B	1	2	3	4	5	6	7	8	9	10	Final
Ontario (Fedosa) 🔨	2	0	0	3	0	2	0	0	0	0	7
Northern Ontario (Johnston)	0	2	0	0	2	0	2	0	0	2	8

Sheet C	1	2	3	4	5	6	7	8	9	10	Final
Nova Scotia (Clarke) 🔨	0	1	0	2	0	2	0	1	1	0	7
Manitoba (German)	1	0	2	0	3	0	1	0	0	1	8

Sheet D	1	2	3	4	5	6	7	8	9	10	Final
Alberta (MacDonald) 🔨	0	0	1	0	0	1	0	0	0	X	2
Saskatchewan (Hritzuk)	0	1	0	1	1	0	2	1	1	X	7

Sheet E	1	2	3	4	5	6	7	8	9	10	Final
British Columbia (McTavish) 🔨	1	0	2	0	2	0	0	3	X	X	8
Yukon/Northwest Territories (Haines)	0	2	0	0	0	1	0	0	X	X	3

Sheet F	1	2	3	4	5	6	7	8	9	10	Final
New Brunswick (Sullivan) 🔨	1	0	0	1	0	1	1	0	0	X	4
Quebec (Carson)	0	1	1	0	2	0	0	1	2	X	7

==== Draw 21 ====
Sheet A	1	2	3	4	5	6	7	8	9	10	Final
Quebec (Carson) 🔨	1	0	0	2	0	2	1	1	X	X	7
Nova Scotia (Clarke)	0	0	1	0	1	0	0	0	X	X	2

Sheet B	1	2	3	4	5	6	7	8	9	10	Final
Newfoundland and Labrador (Buckle) 🔨	0	0	0	3	0	0	0	4	0	0	7
Ontario (Fedosa)	0	0	1	0	0	1	1	0	3	2	8

Sheet C	1	2	3	4	5	6	7	8	9	10	11	Final
Manitoba (German) 🔨	1	0	0	0	1	0	0	0	1	0	1	4
New Brunswick (Sullivan)	0	0	0	1	0	1	0	0	0	1	0	3

Sheet D	1	2	3	4	5	6	7	8	9	10	Final
Yukon/Northwest Territories (Haines) 🔨	0	0	1	1	0	0	2	0	X	X	4
Alberta (MacDonald)	0	1	0	0	3	2	0	2	X	X	8

Sheet E	1	2	3	4	5	6	7	8	9	10	Final
Saskatchewan (Hritzuk) 🔨	0	0	0	1	1	0	1	0	X	X	3
British Columbia (McTavish)	3	0	2	0	0	1	0	3	X	X	9

Sheet F	1	2	3	4	5	6	7	8	9	10	Final
Northern Ontario (Johnston) 🔨	0	0	1	0	1	0	0	X	X	X	2
Prince Edward Island (MacFadyen)	1	4	0	1	0	1	3	X	X	X	10

=== Playoffs ===
Semifinal		Final
Saskatchewan	2
Ontario	5	Ontario	2
		Manitoba	4

==== Semifinal ====
Sheet C	1	2	3	4	5	6	7	8	9	10	Final
Saskatchewan (Hritzuk) 🔨	0	0	0	0	0	1	1	0	0	X	2
Ontario (Fedosa)	0	0	1	0	1	0	0	0	3	X	5

Player percentages
Saskatchewan		Ontario	
Garry Craig	80%	Bob Haw	75%
Dan Greschuk	78%	Greg Ward	81%
Larry Ruf	78%	David Stewart	83%
Eugene Hritzuk	75%	Bob Fedosa	86%
Total	78%	Total	81%

==== Final ====
Sheet C	1	2	3	4	5	6	7	8	9	10	Final
Ontario (Fedosa)	0	0	0	0	1	0	0	0	1	0	2
Manitoba (German) 🔨	0	0	1	0	0	0	0	1	0	2	4

Player percentages
Ontario		Manitoba	
Bob Haw	84%	Brian Copeland	75%
Greg Ward	74%	Ray McDougall	74%
David Stewart	76%	Ray Fillion	88%
Bob Fedosa	75%	Carl German	81%
Total	77%	Total	79%

== Women's ==
=== Teams ===
Province / Territory	Skip	Third	Second	Lead
Alberta	Simone Handfield	Jean Slemko	Joanell Ranger	Lori Kosh
British Columbia	Morreen MacLeod	Betty Johnston	Linda Watson	Janeen Curley
Manitoba	Elaine Jones	Rita Vande Vyvere	Clarice Fitzpatrick	Rae Campbell
New Brunswick	Joan Davis	Ellen Brennan	Fran Meehan	Jill Wallace
Newfoundland and Labrador	Barbara Pinsent	Sandra Brawley	Marcheta Gallant	Georgina Hamlyn
Northern Ontario	Maymar Gemell	Brenda Johnston	Arlene Stepanick	Barbara Gordon
Nova Scotia	Yvonne Martin	Carol Hampsey	Donna MacKinnon	Allison Weagle
Ontario	Anne Dunn	Lindy Marchuk	Gloria Campbell	Carol Thompson
Prince Edward Island	Shirley Berry	Sherren Morrison	Arleen Harris	Linda Fairhurst
Quebec	Agnes Charette	Martha Don	Lois Baines	Mary Anne Robertson
Saskatchewan	Nancy Kerr	Linda Burnham	Kenda Richards	Gertie Pick
Yukon/Northwest Territories	Madeline Boyd	Arla Repka	Elaine Sumner	Elizabeth Friesen

=== Standings ===
Locale	Skip	W	L
Ontario	Anne Dunn	10	1
Alberta	Simone Handfield	9	2
Saskatchewan	Nancy Kerr	8	3
British Columbia	Morreen MacLeod	7	4
Quebec	Agnes Charette	7	4
Manitoba	Elaine Jones	6	5
Northern Ontario	Maymar Gemmell	6	5
Nova Scotia	Yvonne Martin	4	7
Yukon/Northwest Territories	Madeline Boyd	3	8
Prince Edward Island	Shirley Berry	3	8
New Brunswick	Joan Davis	2	9
Newfoundland and Labrador	Barbara Pinsent	1	10

=== Results ===
==== Draw 1 ====
Sheet A	1	2	3	4	5	6	7	8	9	10	Final
Prince Edward Island (Berry) 🔨	1	0	0	0	0	3	0	0	2	1	7
Yukon/Northwest Territories (Boyd)	0	0	1	1	3	0	2	1	0	0	8

Sheet C	1	2	3	4	5	6	7	8	9	10	11	Final
Ontario (Dunn) 🔨	1	1	0	1	0	0	2	0	1	0	1	7
Manitoba (Jones)	0	0	2	0	1	0	0	1	0	2	0	6

Sheet E	1	2	3	4	5	6	7	8	9	10	Final
Alberta (Handfield) 🔨	0	0	1	0	1	0	1	0	1	X	4
Quebec (Charette)	0	1	0	2	0	3	0	1	0	X	7

==== Draw 2 ====
Sheet A	1	2	3	4	5	6	7	8	9	10	Final
New Brunswick (Davis) 🔨	0	0	1	0	0	0	0	X	X	X	1
Northern Ontario (Gemmell)	0	0	0	1	3	1	4	X	X	X	8

Sheet C	1	2	3	4	5	6	7	8	9	10	Final
Newfoundland and Labrador (Pinsent)	0	2	0	0	1	0	1	0	2	0	6
Saskatchewan (Kerr) 🔨	2	0	2	1	0	1	0	2	0	1	9

Sheet E	1	2	3	4	5	6	7	8	9	10	11	Final
British Columbia (MacLeod) 🔨	2	0	0	1	0	0	0	0	0	3	0	6
Nova Scotia (Martin)	0	1	1	0	0	0	2	1	1	0	1	7

==== Draw 3 ====
Sheet B	1	2	3	4	5	6	7	8	9	10	Final
Ontario (Dunn) 🔨	1	0	1	0	2	0	0	0	0	X	4
Alberta (Handfield)	0	2	0	2	0	1	0	0	1	X	6

Sheet D	1	2	3	4	5	6	7	8	9	10	Final
Manitoba (Jones) 🔨	0	0	1	0	0	2	0	0	0	X	3
Prince Edward Island (Berry)	1	1	0	0	3	0	1	1	2	X	9

Sheet F	1	2	3	4	5	6	7	8	9	10	Final
Yukon/Northwest Territories (Boyd) 🔨	0	1	1	0	0	0	X	X	X	X	2
Quebec (Charette)	1	0	0	4	5	1	X	X	X	X	11

==== Draw 4 ====
Sheet B	1	2	3	4	5	6	7	8	9	10	Final
New Brunswick (Davis) 🔨	1	0	1	0	0	1	0	1	0	X	4
British Columbia (McLeod)	0	2	0	3	0	0	2	0	1	X	8

Sheet D	1	2	3	4	5	6	7	8	9	10	Final
Northern Ontario (Gemmell) 🔨	0	0	4	1	0	0	2	1	1	X	9
Newfoundland and Labrador (Pinsent)	1	0	0	0	2	1	0	0	0	X	4

Sheet F	1	2	3	4	5	6	7	8	9	10	Final
Saskatchewan (Kerr) 🔨	0	1	2	0	0	1	0	2	1	X	7
Nova Scotia (Martin)	0	0	0	1	0	0	1	0	0	X	2

==== Draw 5 ====
Sheet A	1	2	3	4	5	6	7	8	9	10	Final
Nova Scotia (Martin) 🔨	3	0	0	0	1	0	0	2	1	1	8
New Brunswick (Davis)	0	3	1	1	0	0	1	0	0	0	6

Sheet C	1	2	3	4	5	6	7	8	9	10	Final
British Columbia (MacLeod) 🔨	0	2	1	0	3	0	0	0	3	X	9
Newfoundland and Labrador (Pinsent)	0	0	0	1	0	1	1	1	0	X	4

Sheet E	1	2	3	4	5	6	7	8	9	10	Final
Saskatchewan (Kerr) 🔨	0	0	2	0	0	1	1	0	4	X	8
Northern Ontario (Gemmell)	0	0	0	1	1	0	0	2	0	X	4

==== Draw 6 ====
Sheet A	1	2	3	4	5	6	7	8	9	10	Final
Quebec (Charette) 🔨	1	0	1	0	2	0	0	0	1	X	5
Ontario (Dunn)	0	3	0	1	0	2	0	1	0	X	7

Sheet C	1	2	3	4	5	6	7	8	9	10	Final
Yukon/Northwest Territories (Boyd) 🔨	1	0	0	0	0	2	0	0	X	X	3
Manitoba (Jones)	0	2	1	1	2	0	1	2	X	X	9

Sheet E	1	2	3	4	5	6	7	8	9	10	Final
Alberta (Handfield) 🔨	0	0	0	4	0	3	0	1	0	X	8
Prince Edward Island (Berry)	0	1	0	0	1	0	1	0	1	X	4

==== Draw 7 ====
Sheet B	1	2	3	4	5	6	7	8	9	10	Final
Newfoundland and Labrador (Pinsent) 🔨	1	0	0	0	1	0	2	0	1	X	5
Nova Scotia (Martin)	0	1	1	0	0	3	0	1	0	X	6

Sheet D	1	2	3	4	5	6	7	8	9	10	Final
New Brunswick (Davis) 🔨	2	0	0	1	0	1	0	0	1	0	5
Saskatchewan (Foster)	0	1	0	0	1	0	3	1	0	1	7

Sheet F	1	2	3	4	5	6	7	8	9	10	Final
Northern Ontario (Gemmell) 🔨	1	0	0	3	0	1	0	2	0	1	8
British Columbia (MacLeod)	0	1	1	0	2	0	1	0	1	0	6

==== Draw 8 ====
Sheet B	1	2	3	4	5	6	7	8	9	10	Final
Ontario (Dunn) 🔨	1	1	0	2	3	0	1	0	4	X	12
Yukon/Northwest Territories (Boyd)	0	0	1	0	0	1	0	2	0	X	4

Sheet D	1	2	3	4	5	6	7	8	9	10	Final
Prince Edward Island (Berry) 🔨	0	0	0	0	2	1	0	1	0	X	4
Quebec (Charette)	1	1	1	3	0	0	2	0	1	X	9

Sheet F	1	2	3	4	5	6	7	8	9	10	Final
Manitoba (Jones) 🔨	0	1	0	1	0	1	0	2	0	0	5
Alberta (Handfield)	1	0	0	0	2	0	2	0	1	1	7

==== Draw 9 ====
Sheet B	1	2	3	4	5	6	7	8	9	10	Final
Quebec (Charette) 🔨	0	0	2	0	1	0	1	0	1	1	6
Manitoba (Jones)	0	0	0	1	0	0	0	1	0	0	2

Sheet D	1	2	3	4	5	6	7	8	9	10	Final
Alberta (Handfield) 🔨	1	0	1	1	2	1	1	3	X	X	10
Yukon/Northwest Territories (Boyd)	0	0	0	0	0	0	0	0	X	X	0

Sheet F	1	2	3	4	5	6	7	8	9	10	Final
Prince Edward Island (Berry) 🔨	0	1	0	1	0	2	0	1	0	0	5
Ontario (Dunn)	1	0	0	0	2	0	1	0	1	1	6

==== Draw 10 ====
Sheet B	1	2	3	4	5	6	7	8	9	10	Final
Nova Scotia (Martin) 🔨	2	1	0	1	0	2	0	0	2	X	8
Northern Ontario (Gemmell)	0	0	1	0	2	0	0	2	0	X	5

Sheet D	1	2	3	4	5	6	7	8	9	10	Final
British Columbia (MacLeod) 🔨	2	0	0	2	2	0	0	0	2	1	9
Saskatchewan (Kerr)	0	1	2	0	0	1	2	2	0	0	8

Sheet F	1	2	3	4	5	6	7	8	9	10	Final
Newfoundland and Labrador (Pinsent) 🔨	0	0	1	1	0	2	0	0	1	X	5
New Brunswick (Davis)	2	1	0	0	2	0	1	3	0	X	9

==== Draw 12 ====
Sheet A	1	2	3	4	5	6	7	8	9	10	Final
Yukon/Northwest Territories (Boyd) 🔨	1	0	1	0	1	0	2	0	1	X	6
British Columbia (MacLeod)	0	1	0	3	0	3	0	2	0	X	9

Sheet B	1	2	3	4	5	6	7	8	9	10	Final
Manitoba (Jones) 🔨	0	0	2	0	1	0	3	1	1	2	10
Saskatchewan (Kerr)	1	2	0	2	0	1	0	0	0	0	6

Sheet C	1	2	3	4	5	6	7	8	9	10	Final
Alberta (Handfield) 🔨	1	0	0	0	1	1	0	3	0	X	6
Nova Scotia (Martin)	0	0	0	0	0	0	2	0	1	X	3

Sheet D	1	2	3	4	5	6	7	8	9	10	Final
Ontario (Dunn) 🔨	0	0	1	1	0	3	0	0	1	X	6
Northern Ontario (Gemmell)	0	0	0	0	1	0	1	0	0	X	2

Sheet E	1	2	3	4	5	6	7	8	9	10	Final
Quebec (Charette) 🔨	2	0	2	1	2	3	X	X	X	X	10
Newfoundland and Labrador (Pinsent)	0	1	0	0	0	0	X	X	X	X	1

Sheet F	1	2	3	4	5	6	7	8	9	10	Final
Prince Edward Island (Berry) 🔨	0	0	1	0	1	0	2	1	0	X	5
New Brunswick (Davis)	0	0	0	0	0	2	0	0	1	X	3

==== Draw 14 ====
Sheet A	1	2	3	4	5	6	7	8	9	10	Final
New Brunswick (Davis) 🔨	1	0	0	0	0	0	0	1	X	X	2
Ontario (Dunn)	0	0	1	2	1	2	1	0	X	X	7

Sheet B	1	2	3	4	5	6	7	8	9	10	Final
Newfoundland and Labrador (Pinsent) 🔨	1	0	3	0	1	0	2	2	0	0	9
Prince Edward Island (Berry)	0	1	0	2	0	3	0	0	1	1	8

Sheet C	1	2	3	4	5	6	7	8	9	10	Final
Saskatchewan (Kerr) 🔨	6	0	3	0	0	1	X	X	X	X	10
Yukon/Northwest Territories (Boyd)	0	1	0	1	0	0	X	X	X	X	2

Sheet D	1	2	3	4	5	6	7	8	9	10	Final
Nova Scotia (Martin) 🔨	0	1	0	1	0	2	0	0	X	X	4
Quebec (Charette)	1	0	3	0	3	0	2	2	X	X	11

Sheet E	1	2	3	4	5	6	7	8	9	10	Final
Northern Ontario (Gemmell) 🔨	2	0	1	0	0	1	0	0	1	X	5
Manitoba (Jones)	0	1	0	1	2	0	3	1	0	X	8

Sheet F	1	2	3	4	5	6	7	8	9	10	11	Final
British Columbia (MacLeod) 🔨	0	1	1	0	2	0	1	0	1	0	0	6
Alberta (Handfield)	1	0	0	1	0	1	0	1	0	2	1	7

==== Draw 16 ====
Sheet A	1	2	3	4	5	6	7	8	9	10	Final
Prince Edward Island (Berry) 🔨	0	0	0	0	0	0	X	X	X	X	0
British Columbia (MacLeod)	1	2	3	1	4	1	X	X	X	X	12

Sheet B	1	2	3	4	5	6	7	8	9	10	Final
Quebec (Charette) 🔨	1	0	0	2	0	0	1	0	0	1	5
Saskatchewan (Kerr)	0	1	1	0	1	1	0	0	2	0	6

Sheet C	1	2	3	4	5	6	7	8	9	10	Final
Alberta (Handfield) 🔨	2	1	1	1	0	1	0	0	3	X	9
Northern Ontario (Gemmell)	0	0	0	0	2	0	0	1	0	X	3

Sheet D	1	2	3	4	5	6	7	8	9	10	Final
Ontario (Dunn) 🔨	2	3	0	1	0	2	0	2	X	X	10
Nova Scotia (Martin)	0	0	1	0	1	0	1	0	X	X	3

Sheet E	1	2	3	4	5	6	7	8	9	10	Final
Yukon/Northwest Territories (Boyd) 🔨	0	0	0	0	0	3	0	X	X	X	3
New Brunswick (Davis)	3	0	2	2	1	0	5	X	X	X	13

Sheet F	1	2	3	4	5	6	7	8	9	10	Final
Manitoba (Jones) 🔨	0	1	0	2	0	2	1	0	2	2	10
Newfoundland and Labrador (Pinsent)	1	0	2	0	1	0	0	2	0	0	6

==== Draw 18 ====
Sheet A	1	2	3	4	5	6	7	8	9	10	Final
Alberta (Handfield) 🔨	5	0	0	0	2	1	0	2	X	X	10
Newfoundland and Labrador (Pinsent)	0	2	0	1	0	0	1	0	X	X	4

Sheet B	1	2	3	4	5	6	7	8	9	10	Final
Yukon/Northwest Territories (Boyd) 🔨	1	1	0	0	0	1	1	0	X	X	4
Northern Ontario (Gemmell)	0	0	3	2	2	0	0	3	X	X	10

Sheet C	1	2	3	4	5	6	7	8	9	10	11	Final
Quebec (Charette) 🔨	1	0	0	0	1	1	0	1	0	1	1	6
New Brunswick (Davis)	0	0	0	2	0	0	2	0	1	0	0	5

Sheet D	1	2	3	4	5	6	7	8	9	10	Final
Manitoba (Jones) 🔨	0	2	0	1	0	0	0	2	0	X	5
British Columbia (MacLeod)	1	0	2	0	1	1	2	0	3	X	10

Sheet E	1	2	3	4	5	6	7	8	9	10	Final
Prince Edward Island (Berry) 🔨	2	0	0	2	3	0	1	1	0	1	10
Nova Scotia (Martin)	0	2	2	0	0	2	0	0	1	0	7

Sheet F	1	2	3	4	5	6	7	8	9	10	Final
Ontario (Dunn) 🔨	2	0	1	2	0	2	0	1	2	X	10
Saskatchewan (Kerr)	0	2	0	0	2	0	2	0	0	X	6

==== Draw 20 ====
Sheet A	1	2	3	4	5	6	7	8	9	10	Final
Nova Scotia (Martin) 🔨	0	0	0	1	0	0	0	X	X	X	1
Manitoba (Jones)	1	1	1	0	4	1	1	X	X	X	9

Sheet B	1	2	3	4	5	6	7	8	9	10	Final
New Brunswick (Davis) 🔨	1	0	2	0	1	0	0	1	0	X	5
Alberta (Handfield)	0	2	0	2	0	2	2	0	4	X	12

Sheet C	1	2	3	4	5	6	7	8	9	10	Final
Saskatchewan (Kerr) 🔨	1	2	0	7	0	0	0	X	X	X	10
Prince Edward Island (Berry)	0	0	1	0	2	1	0	X	X	X	4

Sheet D	1	2	3	4	5	6	7	8	9	10	Final
Newfoundland and Labrador (Pinsent) 🔨	0	1	0	1	0	1	X	X	X	X	3
Yukon/Northwest Territories (Boyd)	5	0	2	0	2	0	X	X	X	X	9

Sheet E	1	2	3	4	5	6	7	8	9	10	Final
British Columbia (MacLeod) 🔨	0	0	1	0	0	1	X	X	X	X	2
Ontario (Dunn)	3	1	0	1	4	0	X	X	X	X	9

Sheet F	1	2	3	4	5	6	7	8	9	10	Final
Northern Ontario (Gemmell) 🔨	1	1	1	0	3	0	0	1	0	1	8
Quebec (Charette)	0	0	0	2	0	2	1	0	1	0	6

==== Draw 22 ====
Sheet A	1	2	3	4	5	6	7	8	9	10	Final
Saskatchewan (Kerr) 🔨	0	0	0	1	0	0	4	0	1	X	6
Alberta (Handfield)	0	0	1	0	2	0	0	1	0	X	4

Sheet B	1	2	3	4	5	6	7	8	9	10	Final
Northern Ontario (Gemmell) 🔨	1	0	3	0	5	0	0	0	0	2	11
Prince Edward Island (Berry)	0	2	0	1	0	3	1	1	1	0	9

Sheet C	1	2	3	4	5	6	7	8	9	10	Final
British Columbia (MacLeod) 🔨	0	1	1	0	0	1	0	0	3	X	6
Quebec (Charette)	2	0	0	0	1	0	0	1	0	X	4

Sheet D	1	2	3	4	5	6	7	8	9	10	Final
New Brunswick (Davis) 🔨	0	1	1	1	0	0	0	2	0	X	5
Manitoba (Jones)	1	0	0	0	2	3	3	0	2	X	11

Sheet E	1	2	3	4	5	6	7	8	9	10	Final
Newfoundland and Labrador (Pinsent) 🔨	1	0	0	1	0	0	X	X	X	X	2
Ontario (Dunn)	0	2	3	0	1	1	X	X	X	X	7

Sheet F	1	2	3	4	5	6	7	8	9	10	Final
Nova Scotia (Martin) 🔨	0	2	0	3	0	2	0	1	0	1	9
Yukon/Northwest Territories (Boyd)	3	0	3	0	2	0	0	0	2	0	10

=== Playoffs ===
Semifinal		Final
Saskatchewan	2
Alberta	9	Alberta	5
		Ontario	7

==== Semifinal ====
Sheet C	1	2	3	4	5	6	7	8	9	10	Final
Saskatchewan (Kerr)	0	0	1	0	0	1	0	0	X	X	2
Alberta (Handfield) 🔨	1	1	0	2	3	0	2	0	X	X	9

Player percentages
Saskatchewan		Alberta	
Gertie Pick	55%	Lori Kosh	46%
Kenda Richards	58%	Joanell Ranger	69%
Linda Burnham	55%	Jean Slemko	78%
Nancy Kerr	47%	Simone Handfield	67%
Total	54%	Total	66%

==== Final ====
Sheet C	1	2	3	4	5	6	7	8	9	10	Final
Alberta (Handfield)	0	0	1	0	1	0	2	0	1	0	5
Ontario (Dunn) 🔨	0	0	0	1	0	1	0	2	0	3	7

Player percentages
Alberta		Ontario	
Lori Kosh	74%	Carol Thompson	71%
Joanell Ranger	66%	Gloria Campbell	85%
Jean Slemko	69%	Lindy Marchuk	59%
Simone Handfield	76%	Anne Dunn	89%
Total	71%	Total	76%
