= Anne Dunn (curler) =

Canadian curler

Medal record

Curling

World Senior Championships
Gold medal – first place	2002 Bismarck	
Gold medal – first place	2004 Gävle	
Silver medal – second place	2007 Edmonton	

Anne Dunn (née Vale) born May 27, 1947) is a Canadian curler from Cambridge, Ontario. She was the skip of a team nicknamed "the Golden Girls", who won four Canadian senior championships, and two-time World senior championships in the 2000s.

Dunn was born in Toronto, Ontario and moved to Galt, Ontario (now Cambridge) when she was about 15. In Galt, she attended Glenview Park Secondary School and Galt Collegiate Institute and Vocational School, where she played basketball, volleyball, badminton and track and field.

== Women's career ==
Dunn began curling in 1967 at the Galt County Club when a friend introduced her to the sport when she was working as a teller at Waterloo Trust and Savings. She began curling competitively in 1973, winning the Southern Ontario Ladies Curling Association Business Girls' provincial curling championship that year. She won the title again in 1978.

Dunn qualified for the Ontario Women's Curling Championship (Ontario Scott Tournament of Hearts) for the first time in 1983 with teammates Patti Chow, Kim Duck and Gloria Campbell, after going undefeated in the Southern Ontario championship. The team finished the provincial Hearts with a 2–3 record. The following year, the team qualified for the provincial championship again, finishing with a 3–2 record, second place behind Jill Greenwood.

Dunn joined the Carol Thompson rink for the 1986–87 season, playing third on the team, after her previous team split up. The team would go on to win the 1987 Ontario Women's Curling Championship, defeating Alison Goring in the final. The team represented Ontario at the 1987 Scott Tournament of Hearts, Canada's national women's curling championship, where they finished 6–5.

Dunn returned to the Ontario Women's Curling Championship in 1990, finishing 7th in the province that year, with a 4–5 record. She and her rink of Patti Lank, Lindy Crawford and Barb Senyk returned in 1992. There, the team finished round robin with a 7–2 record, before losing to eventual champion Kim Clark in the semifinal.

Dunn's third Jo-Ann Rizzo switched positions for the 1994–95 season, with Dunn moving to third on the team, and Rizzo skipping. The team made it to the 1995 Ontario provincials, where they finished 5–4. The team qualified again for the 1996 provincials, finishing 4–5.

In 1998, Dunn won a senior mixed title playing third for Merv Roberts.

Dunn returned to skipping, and played in the 1999 Ontario Scott Tournament of Hearts provincial championships, leading her team to a 5–4 record.

== Seniors ==
Dunn found most of her success as a senior-aged (50+) curler. At the age of 53, she formed a senior rink for the first time, having waited for Lindy Marchuk to turn 50 and be eligible. Marchuk would play third for Dunn, along with Gloria Campbell from St. Catharines and Fran Todd from Mississauga. In their first season together, the team won the Ontario Senior Women's title in 2001, defeating Joyce Potter in the final. The team then went on to represent Ontario at the 2001 Canadian Senior Curling Championships, where Dunn led Ontario to a 7–4 round robin record. The team then won four straight games, including two tiebreakers, to claim the Canadian Senior Championship, beating Manitoba's Linda Van Daele in the final.

In 2002, Team Dunn successfully defended their provincial title, defeating Mary Gellard in the provincial final. The team won the game shorthanded, as lead Fran Todd had fallen in the semifinal, resulting in a broken arm. With Todd injured, the team replaced her with Dunn's former skip, Carol Thompson at lead. At the 2002 Canadian Senior Curling Championships, Dunn led Ontario to a 10–1 round robin record, good enough for first place, earning the rink a bye to the final. In the final, the team beat Alberta's Simone Handfield team to claim their second-straight national championship. The win earned Dunn and her rink the right to represent Canada at the 2002 World Senior Curling Championships, the inaugural edition of the World Senior Curling Championships. There, Dunn led Canada to a gold medal, beating Switzerland's Erika Müller in the final, after posting a 4–2 round robin record.

Dunn and her rink could not win a third straight provincial seniors title, having lost to Joyce Potter in the 2003 provincial final. As a result, the team decided to enter the 2003 Ontario Scott Tournament of Hearts last chance qualifier event, where they eliminated the defending provincial women's champion team, skipped by Sherry Middaugh, beating her in the B final. A the Ontario Hearts, Dunn led her senior-aged team who were dubbed the "Golden Girls" to a 7–2 round robin record. This put the team into the playoffs, where they defeated the previously undefeated Anne Merklinger rink in the 1 vs. 2 page playoff game, then Darcie Simpson in the final, to claim the provincial championship. The team then represented Ontario at the 2003 Scott Tournament of Hearts on home ice in Kitchener. There, Dunn led her rink to a 5–6 record, missing the playoffs.

In 2004, Dunn and her rink won their third provincial senior title, beating Joyce Potter in the Ontario final. Representing Ontario, the team went undefeated at the 2004 Canadian Senior Curling Championships, winning all 11 of their round robin games, and beating British Columbia's Kathy Smiley rink in the final, to claim their third national title. It was a record fifth provincial title for the team's second, Gloria Campbell who had also won two championships with Jill Greenwood. They then represented Canada at the 2004 World Senior Curling Championships, where Dunn led the team to a 6–3 round robin record before beating the United States in the semifinal, and Sweden's Ingrid Meldahl rink in the final.

After the Canadian Curling Association (CCA) re-jigged its championship schedule for the 2004–05 curling season, which meant the 2005 Canadian Seniors would be held at the same time as the 2005 World Seniors, it was decided that Dunn and her team would get to represent Canada again at the 2005 World Senior Curling Championships, but would be forced to not enter playdowns for the Canadian Championship. At the 2005 World Seniors, Dunn led her rink to an undefeated 5–0 record, but lost in the semifinals to Scotland, and in the bronze medal game to Sweden.

The team's lead, Fran Todd joined the CCA's board of directors in 2005, and could not commit to curling with the team for the 2005–06 season. She was replaced as lead by the team's fifth, Carol Thompson. With the slight change in the lineup, Dunn won her final provincial seniors title in 2006, defeating Joyce Potter (who had won the championship in 2005 in Dunn's absence) once again in the final. At the 2006 Canadian Senior Curling Championships, Dunn led Ontario to a 10–1 round robin record, earning a bye to the final. There, they beat British Columbia's Jane Adam to claim her fourth national title. The win tied Dunn with Jill Greenwood and Flora Martin for the most ever Canadian Senior titles for a skip. The win earned the team the right to represent Canada at the 2007 World Senior Curling Championships. There, the team went undefeated in the round robin, and made it to the final after beating Scotland in the semifinal. However, they lost their only game of the tournament in the final, when Sweden's Ingrid Meldahl beat them.

Dunn attempted to win another provincial seniors championship in 2008, but finished 2–5 at that year's provincial. In 2009, she lost in the provincial final to Cheryl McBain. She would qualify for the provincial senior championships again in 2011, and 2012.

In 2013, she scored a rare eight-ender at the Holly Berry Bonspiel in Mississauga, the first time she had done so in her career.

In 2016, Dunn won an Ontario Masters title, along with Carol Thompson, Vicki Marianchuk and Fran Todd.

== Personal life ==
Dunn worked as a law clerk for the law firm of Gowling Strathy and Henderson from 1981, and retired in 2011. She is married to Bill Dunn, and also golfs, and plays volleyball. She was inducted into the Cambridge Sports Hall of Fame in 2016, and the Canadian Curling Hall of Fame in 2007, along with the rest of her team.
