= 1999 Canadian Senior Curling Championships =

- Host city: Saskatoon, Saskatchewan
- Arena: Nutana Curling Club
- Dates: January 23–31, 1999
- Men's winner: British Columbia
- Skip: Ken Watson
- Third: Ed Dezura
- Second: John Himbury
- Lead: Howard Grisack
- Finalist: Ontario
- Women's winner: Quebec
- Skip: Agnes Charette
- Third: Martha Don
- Second: Lois Baines
- Lead: Mary Anne Robertson
- Finalist: British Columbia

The 1999 CIBC Canadian Senior Curling Championships were held January 23 to 31 at the Nutana Curling Club in Saskatoon, Saskatchewan.

== Men's ==
=== Teams ===
Province / Territory	Skip	Third	Second	Lead
Alberta	Orville MacDonald	Keith Morgan	Dave Luchko	Wally Zapisocki
British Columbia	Ken Watson	Ed Dezura	John Himbury	Howard Grisack
Manitoba	Ron Westcott	Neil Andrews	Bob Boughey	Ron Toews
New Brunswick	Laurie LeBlanc	Victor Ouellette	Richard Shaw	Leo Paul Theriault
Newfoundland	Don Bradshaw	Doug Warren	George King	Carl Loughlin
Northern Ontario	Gary Ball	Dennis Clifford	Terry Gilbart	Ken Cressman
Nova Scotia	Doug Spence	Gary Copp	Sam MacKay	Jim Quinn
Ontario	Jim Sharples	Brian Longley	Joe Gurowka	Art Lobel
Prince Edward Island	Lou Nowlan	Fred Hiscock	Wayne Gardiner	Raymond Thomson
Quebec	Jean St-Pierre	Malcolm Baines	Jean-J. Lafontiane	Ron Roy
Saskatchewan	Ray Field	Gary Brandon	Dave Kradovill	Dale McHarg
Yukon/Northwest Territories	Paul Cowan	Perry Savoie	Alan West	Gerry Coukell

=== Standings ===
Locale	Skip	W	L
British Columbia	Ken Watson	9	2
Ontario	Jim Sharples	9	2
Manitoba	Ron Westcott	8	3
Alberta	Orville MacDonald	7	4
Saskatchewan	Ray Field	6	5
Northern Ontario	Gary Ball	6	5
Nova Scotia	Doug Spence	5	6
Yukon/Northwest Territories	Paul Cowan	5	6
Prince Edward Island	Lou Nowlan	3	8
Newfoundland	Don Bradshaw	3	8
New Brunswick	Laurie LeBlanc	3	8
Quebec	Jean St-Pierre	2	9

=== Results ===
==== Draw 1 ====
Sheet A	1	2	3	4	5	6	7	8	9	10	Final
Nova Scotia (Spence)	0	0	0	2	1	0	0	0	0	X	3
Ontario (Sharples) 🔨	0	1	1	0	0	0	0	3	2	X	7

Sheet C	1	2	3	4	5	6	7	8	9	10	Final
Quebec (St-Pierre)	0	0	1	1	0	1	0	0	0	X	3
Northern Ontario (Ball) 🔨	1	0	0	0	2	0	1	1	1	X	6

Sheet E	1	2	3	4	5	6	7	8	9	10	Final
Newfoundland (Bradshaw)	0	0	0	1	0	1	0	0	0	X	2
British Columbia (Watson) 🔨	0	1	0	0	2	0	1	2	2	X	8

==== Draw 2 ====
Sheet A	1	2	3	4	5	6	7	8	9	10	Final
Alberta (MacDonald) 🔨	0	1	0	1	4	0	4	X	X	X	10
Yukon/Northwest Territories (Cowan)	1	0	1	0	0	1	0	X	X	X	3

Sheet C	1	2	3	4	5	6	7	8	9	10	Final
Prince Edward Island (Nowlan)	0	1	0	0	2	0	0	0	1	0	4
Saskatchewan (Field) 🔨	2	0	1	0	0	0	0	1	0	1	5

Sheet E	1	2	3	4	5	6	7	8	9	10	Final
Manitoba (Westcott) 🔨	1	0	2	1	0	1	0	3	0	X	8
New Brunswick (LeBlanc)	0	1	0	0	1	0	1	0	1	X	4

==== Draw 3 ====
Sheet B	1	2	3	4	5	6	7	8	9	10	Final
British Columbia (Watson) 🔨	0	2	0	0	2	0	0	2	0	0	6
Northern Ontario (Ball)	0	0	2	1	0	2	1	0	1	1	8

Sheet D	1	2	3	4	5	6	7	8	9	10	Final
Newfoundland (Bradshaw) 🔨	0	2	0	0	1	1	0	0	0	X	4
Ontario (Sharples)	2	0	1	0	0	0	2	1	2	X	8

Sheet F	1	2	3	4	5	6	7	8	9	10	Final
Nova Scotia (Spence) 🔨	1	0	3	0	3	0	1	1	0	X	9
Quebec (St-Pierre)	0	1	0	1	0	2	0	0	1	X	5

==== Draw 4 ====
Sheet B	1	2	3	4	5	6	7	8	9	10	Final
New Brunswick (LeBlanc) 🔨	1	0	2	0	1	0	0	1	0	X	5
Yukon/Northwest Territories (Cowan)	0	1	0	5	0	1	1	0	2	X	10

Sheet D	1	2	3	4	5	6	7	8	9	10	Final
Manitoba (Westcott) 🔨	1	0	0	2	0	0	0	1	0	X	4
Saskatchewan (Field)	0	0	0	0	0	1	1	0	1	X	3

Sheet F	1	2	3	4	5	6	7	8	9	10	Final
Prince Edward Island (Nowlan) 🔨	1	2	0	0	0	0	0	0	X	X	3
Alberta (MacDonald)	0	0	3	1	1	0	1	2	X	X	8

==== Draw 5 ====
Sheet B	1	2	3	4	5	6	7	8	9	10	Final
Quebec (St-Pierre) 🔨	0	1	1	1	0	2	0	1	1	0	7
Newfoundland (Bradshaw)	2	0	0	0	2	0	2	0	0	2	8

Sheet D	1	2	3	4	5	6	7	8	9	10	Final
Northern Ontario (Ball) 🔨	0	2	1	0	2	0	2	0	3	X	10
Nova Scotia (Spence)	0	0	0	1	0	3	0	1	0	X	5

Sheet F	1	2	3	4	5	6	7	8	9	10	Final
Ontario (Sharples) 🔨	2	1	0	2	0	0	0	0	0	0	5
British Columbia (Watson)	0	0	1	0	2	0	1	0	1	1	6

==== Draw 6 ====
Sheet B	1	2	3	4	5	6	7	8	9	10	11	Final
Alberta (MacDonald) 🔨	0	0	0	0	0	2	1	0	0	1	3	7
Manitoba (Westcott)	1	0	1	0	1	0	0	0	1	0	0	4

Sheet D	1	2	3	4	5	6	7	8	9	10	Final
Yukon/Northwest Territories (Cowan) 🔨	0	1	0	1	0	1	1	1	0	3	8
Prince Edward Island (Nowlan)	1	0	1	0	3	0	0	0	1	0	6

Sheet F	1	2	3	4	5	6	7	8	9	10	Final
Saskatchewan (Field) 🔨	2	0	1	0	1	0	0	0	1	X	5
New Brunswick (LeBlanc)	0	1	0	3	0	2	1	1	0	X	8

==== Draw 7 ====
Sheet A	1	2	3	4	5	6	7	8	9	10	Final
New Brunswick (LeBlanc) 🔨	1	0	0	1	0	0	0	X	X	X	2
Alberta (MacDonald)	0	2	1	0	2	2	1	X	X	X	8

Sheet C	1	2	3	4	5	6	7	8	9	10	Final
Manitoba (Westcott) 🔨	1	0	4	5	1	X	X	X	X	X	11
Prince Edward Island (Nowlan)	0	2	0	0	0	X	X	X	X	X	2

Sheet E	1	2	3	4	5	6	7	8	9	10	11	Final
Saskatchewan (Field) 🔨	1	1	0	0	2	0	2	0	1	0	0	7
Yukon/Northwest Territories (Cowan)	0	0	3	0	0	1	0	2	0	1	1	8

==== Draw 8 ====
Sheet A	1	2	3	4	5	6	7	8	9	10	11	Final
British Columbia (Watson) 🔨	1	0	0	2	0	1	2	0	1	0	1	8
Quebec (St-Pierre)	0	0	2	0	2	0	0	2	0	1	0	7

Sheet C	1	2	3	4	5	6	7	8	9	10	Final
Ontario (Sharples) 🔨	1	0	3	1	0	2	2	X	X	X	9
Northern Ontario (Ball)	0	1	0	0	1	0	0	X	X	X	2

Sheet E	1	2	3	4	5	6	7	8	9	10	Final
Newfoundland (Bradshaw) 🔨	1	0	1	1	0	1	0	0	2	0	6
Nova Scotia (Spence)	0	1	0	0	2	0	3	1	0	1	8

==== Draw 9 ====
Sheet B	1	2	3	4	5	6	7	8	9	10	Final
Prince Edward Island (Nowlan) 🔨	2	0	0	2	0	2	0	2	0	1	9
New Brunswick (LeBlanc)	0	1	1	0	1	0	2	0	1	0	6

Sheet D	1	2	3	4	5	6	7	8	9	10	Final
Alberta (MacDonald) 🔨	2	0	2	1	0	1	2	0	0	1	9
Saskatchewan (Field)	0	1	0	0	3	0	0	2	1	0	7

Sheet F	1	2	3	4	5	6	7	8	9	10	Final
Yukon/Northwest Territories (Cowan) 🔨	0	0	0	2	0	0	0	2	0	X	4
Manitoba (Westcott)	1	1	1	0	0	3	1	0	2	X	9

==== Draw 10 ====
Sheet B	1	2	3	4	5	6	7	8	9	10	Final
Quebec (St-Pierre) 🔨	0	0	2	0	2	0	0	2	0	X	6
Ontario (Sharples)	1	2	0	2	0	0	2	0	4	X	11

Sheet D	1	2	3	4	5	6	7	8	9	10	11	Final
Nova Scotia (Spence) 🔨	0	1	0	2	0	2	0	2	0	2	0	9
British Columbia (Watson)	1	0	3	0	1	0	2	0	2	0	1	10

Sheet F	1	2	3	4	5	6	7	8	9	10	Final
Northern Ontario (Ball) 🔨	4	0	3	1	1	X	X	X	X	X	9
Newfoundland (Bradshaw)	0	2	0	0	0	X	X	X	X	X	2

==== Draw 11 ====
Sheet A	1	2	3	4	5	6	7	8	9	10	Final
Ontario (Sharples) 🔨	0	1	0	0	0	2	0	2	1	X	6
Manitoba (Westcott)	0	0	0	0	1	0	2	0	0	X	3

Sheet B	1	2	3	4	5	6	7	8	9	10	Final
Northern Ontario (Ball) 🔨	0	0	2	0	0	1	1	0	1	0	5
Saskatchewan (Field)	2	1	0	1	1	0	0	2	0	1	8

Sheet C	1	2	3	4	5	6	7	8	9	10	Final
Newfoundland (Bradshaw) 🔨	1	0	2	0	1	0	2	0	1	1	8
New Brunswick (LeBlanc)	0	2	0	1	0	0	0	1	0	0	4

Sheet D	1	2	3	4	5	6	7	8	9	10	Final
Quebec (St-Pierre) 🔨	2	0	0	0	1	0	1	0	X	X	4
Yukon/Northwest Territories (Cowan)	0	1	2	1	0	2	0	4	X	X	10

Sheet E	1	2	3	4	5	6	7	8	9	10	Final
British Columbia (Watson) 🔨	3	0	2	0	0	0	1	0	0	1	7
Prince Edward Island (Nowlan)	0	2	0	1	0	0	0	2	1	0	6

Sheet F	1	2	3	4	5	6	7	8	9	10	Final
Nova Scotia (Spence) 🔨	2	0	0	3	0	1	0	0	0	2	8
Alberta (MacDonald)	0	1	2	0	0	0	1	3	0	0	7

==== Draw 12 ====
Sheet A	1	2	3	4	5	6	7	8	9	10	11	Final
Alberta (MacDonald) 🔨	0	1	0	1	0	2	0	2	0	2	1	9
Quebec (St-Pierre)	0	0	3	0	2	0	1	0	2	0	0	8

Sheet B	1	2	3	4	5	6	7	8	9	10	11	Final
Prince Edward Island (Nowlan) 🔨	0	1	1	0	3	0	0	3	0	0	0	8
Nova Scotia (Spence)	0	0	0	3	0	0	3	0	1	1	1	9

Sheet C	1	2	3	4	5	6	7	8	9	10	Final
Saskatchewan (Field) 🔨	3	1	0	2	1	0	1	1	X	X	9
Ontario (Sharples)	0	0	2	0	0	1	0	0	X	X	3

Sheet D	1	2	3	4	5	6	7	8	9	10	Final
New Brunswick (LeBlanc) 🔨	0	1	1	2	0	1	0	0	1	1	7
British Columbia (Watson)	1	0	0	0	3	0	1	0	0	0	5

Sheet E	1	2	3	4	5	6	7	8	9	10	Final
Yukon/Northwest Territories (Cowan) 🔨	1	0	2	2	0	1	0	0	3	X	9
Northern Ontario (Ball)	0	1	0	0	2	0	1	1	0	X	5

Sheet F	1	2	3	4	5	6	7	8	9	10	Final
Manitoba (Westcott) 🔨	1	2	2	0	1	0	4	X	X	X	10
Newfoundland (Bradshaw)	0	0	0	2	0	1	0	X	X	X	3

==== Draw 13 ====
Sheet A	1	2	3	4	5	6	7	8	9	10	Final
Newfoundland (Bradshaw) 🔨	0	1	1	0	1	0	0	0	1	X	4
Prince Edward Island (Nowlan)	0	0	0	3	0	1	1	2	0	X	7

Sheet B	1	2	3	4	5	6	7	8	9	10	11	Final
Ontario (Sharples) 🔨	2	0	1	0	0	1	0	1	0	0	1	6
Yukon/Northwest Territories (Cowan)	0	1	0	2	0	0	1	0	0	1	0	5

Sheet C	1	2	3	4	5	6	7	8	9	10	Final
British Columbia (Watson) 🔨	0	0	2	0	0	2	2	0	2	0	8
Alberta (MacDonald)	1	1	0	1	1	0	0	1	0	1	6

Sheet D	1	2	3	4	5	6	7	8	9	10	Final
Northern Ontario (Ball) 🔨	1	0	1	0	0	0	0	0	X	X	2
Manitoba (Westcott)	0	1	0	1	0	0	3	2	X	X	7

Sheet E	1	2	3	4	5	6	7	8	9	10	Final
Nova Scotia (Spence) 🔨	1	0	0	2	0	1	0	0	1	X	5
New Brunswick (LeBlanc)	0	3	2	0	1	0	1	0	0	X	7

Sheet F	1	2	3	4	5	6	7	8	9	10	Final
Quebec (St-Pierre) 🔨	0	0	2	0	1	0	1	0	X	X	4
Saskatchewan (Field)	1	2	0	5	0	2	0	1	X	X	11

==== Draw 14 ====
Sheet A	1	2	3	4	5	6	7	8	9	10	11	Final
New Brunswick (LeBlanc) 🔨	0	1	0	1	1	0	3	0	0	0	0	6
Northern Ontario (Ball)	0	0	1	0	0	2	0	1	1	1	1	7

Sheet B	1	2	3	4	5	6	7	8	9	10	Final
Alberta (MacDonald) 🔨	0	2	1	0	3	0	0	2	3	X	11
Newfoundland (Bradshaw)	1	0	0	1	0	3	1	0	0	X	6

Sheet C	1	2	3	4	5	6	7	8	9	10	Final
Saskatchewan (Field) 🔨	3	0	0	0	2	2	0	0	2	X	9
Nova Scotia (Spence)	0	0	2	1	0	0	1	1	0	X	5

Sheet D	1	2	3	4	5	6	7	8	9	10	Final
Prince Edward Island (Nowlan) 🔨	1	1	0	0	0	0	0	0	X	X	2
Ontario (Sharples)	0	0	2	1	1	3	1	2	X	X	10

Sheet E	1	2	3	4	5	6	7	8	9	10	Final
Manitoba (Westcott) 🔨	1	1	1	0	4	1	0	1	X	X	9
Quebec (St-Pierre)	0	0	0	1	0	0	1	0	X	X	2

Sheet F	1	2	3	4	5	6	7	8	9	10	Final
Yukon/Northwest Territories (Cowan) 🔨	0	1	0	1	0	1	0	2	0	X	5
British Columbia (Watson)	0	0	0	0	4	0	2	0	2	X	8

==== Draw 15 ====
Sheet A	1	2	3	4	5	6	7	8	9	10	Final
Nova Scotia (Spence) 🔨	0	0	0	1	0	2	1	0	0	X	4
Manitoba (Westcott)	0	2	1	0	1	0	0	4	1	X	9

Sheet B	1	2	3	4	5	6	7	8	9	10	Final
British Columbia (Watson) 🔨	0	0	1	0	3	0	1	0	0	1	6
Saskatchewan (Field)	1	0	0	1	0	1	0	0	2	0	5

Sheet C	1	2	3	4	5	6	7	8	9	10	Final
Newfoundland (Bradshaw) 🔨	0	2	0	0	1	0	1	1	0	2	7
Yukon/Northwest Territories (Cowan)	0	0	2	1	0	1	0	0	0	0	4

Sheet D	1	2	3	4	5	6	7	8	9	10	Final
Quebec (St-Pierre) 🔨	3	0	4	0	0	1	0	0	1	X	9
New Brunswick (LeBlanc)	0	1	0	0	3	0	1	1	0	X	6

Sheet E	1	2	3	4	5	6	7	8	9	10	Final
Ontario (Sharples) 🔨	0	1	0	1	0	1	2	1	0	X	6
Alberta (MacDonald)	1	0	1	0	0	0	0	0	1	X	3

Sheet F	1	2	3	4	5	6	7	8	9	10	Final
Northern Ontario (Ball) 🔨	1	0	0	3	0	2	0	2	0	0	8
Prince Edward Island (Nowlan)	0	1	1	0	2	0	1	0	3	1	9

==== Draw 16 ====
Sheet A	1	2	3	4	5	6	7	8	9	10	Final
Saskatchewan (Field) 🔨	3	0	0	0	1	0	5	X	X	X	9
Newfoundland (Bradshaw)	0	1	0	1	0	1	0	X	X	X	3

Sheet B	1	2	3	4	5	6	7	8	9	10	Final
Yukon/Northwest Territories (Cowan) 🔨	1	0	1	0	0	1	1	1	2	0	7
Nova Scotia (Spence)	0	1	0	3	3	0	0	0	0	4	11

Sheet C	1	2	3	4	5	6	7	8	9	10	Final
Manitoba (Westcott) 🔨	0	1	0	0	0	0	2	0	X	X	3
British Columbia (Watson)	0	0	0	2	2	2	0	3	X	X	9

Sheet D	1	2	3	4	5	6	7	8	9	10	Final
Alberta (MacDonald) 🔨	2	0	0	1	0	0	1	1	0	X	5
Northern Ontario (Ball)	0	2	1	0	0	4	0	0	2	X	9

Sheet E	1	2	3	4	5	6	7	8	9	10	Final
Prince Edward Island (Nowlan) 🔨	0	3	0	0	0	3	0	1	0	X	7
Quebec (St-Pierre)	4	0	1	1	2	0	1	0	3	X	12

Sheet F	1	2	3	4	5	6	7	8	9	10	Final
New Brunswick (LeBlanc) 🔨	2	1	0	0	2	0	2	0	0	0	7
Ontario (Sharples)	0	0	1	1	0	1	0	3	1	1	8

=== Playoffs ===
Semifinal		Final
Ontario	7
Manitoba	5	Ontario	4
		British Columbia	6

==== Semifinal ====
Sheet E	1	2	3	4	5	6	7	8	9	10	Final
Ontario (Sharples) 🔨	3	1	0	0	1	1	0	1	0	X	7
Manitoba (Westcott)	0	0	2	1	0	0	1	0	1	X	5

Player percentages
Ontario		Manitoba	
Art Lobel	86%	Ron Toews	76%
Joe Gurowka	80%	Bob Boughey	76%
Brian Longley	78%	Neil Andrews	69%
Jim Sharples	89%	Ron Westcott	71%
Total	83%	Total	73%

==== Final ====
Sheet C	1	2	3	4	5	6	7	8	9	10	11	Final
Ontario (Sharples)	0	0	0	0	0	1	0	1	0	2	0	4
British Columbia (Watson) 🔨	0	0	1	1	1	0	0	0	1	0	2	6

Player percentages
Ontario		British Columbia	
Art Lobel	85%	Howard Grisack	83%
Joe Gurowka	83%	John Himbury	78%
Brian Longley	71%	Ed Dezura	78%
Jim Sharples	61%	Ken Watson	76%
Total	75%	Total	79%

== Women's ==
=== Teams ===
Province / Territory	Skip	Third	Second	Lead
Alberta	Sandy Turner	Cordella Schwengler	Marilyn Toews	Darlene Breckenridge
British Columbia	Maymar Gemmell	Verna Sivucha	Linda Vanderlinde	Jean McKenzie
Manitoba	Elaine Jones	Clarice Fitzpatrick	Ruth Wiebe	Irene Elias
New Brunswick	Marlene Vaughan	Mona Train	Marlene McLenaghan	Jeannine Tucker
Newfoundland	Sue Anne Bartlett	Shirley Manuel	Cynthia Mills	Ruby Starkes
Northern Ontario	Jan Pula	Diane Bell	Lucille Frick	Colette Hickey
Nova Scotia	Yvonne Martin	Carol Whitmore	Carol Romkey	Audrey Dorey
Ontario	Pat Reid	Dianne Stone	Fran Todd	Lynn Reynolds
Prince Edward Island	Marg Nowlan	Ann Currie	Gen Enman	Mabel Gardiner
Quebec	Agnes Charette	Martha Don	Lois Baines	Mary Anne Robertson
Saskatchewan	Pat Buglass	Sharon Fyke	Gay Mudrey	Lori Harvie
Northwest Territories/Yukon	Barbara Augustin	Minnie O'Sullivan	Juliane Hamer	Milly Steed

=== Standings ===
Locale	Skip	W	L
Quebec	Agnes Charette	9	2
Saskatchewan	Pat Buglass	8	3
British Columbia	Maymar Gemmell	8	3
Alberta	Sandy Turner	7	4
Manitoba	Elaine Jones	7	4
Ontario	Pat Reid	7	4
New Brunswick	Marlene Vaughan	7	4
Northern Ontario	Jan Pula	4	7
Newfoundland	Sue Anne Bartlett	4	7
Prince Edward Island	Marg Nowlan	3	8
Nova Scotia	Yvonne Martin	2	9
Northwest Territories/Yukon	Barbara Augustin	0	11

=== Results ===
==== Draw 1 ====
Sheet B	1	2	3	4	5	6	7	8	9	10	Final
New Brunswick (Vaughan) 🔨	1	1	2	3	0	0	1	1	0	X	9
Prince Edward Island (Nowlan)	0	0	0	0	1	1	0	0	1	X	3

Sheet D	1	2	3	4	5	6	7	8	9	10	Final
Nova Scotia (Martin)	0	2	0	1	1	0	1	0	0	X	5
British Columbia (Gemmell) 🔨	2	0	2	0	0	1	0	0	4	X	9

Sheet F	1	2	3	4	5	6	7	8	9	10	11	Final
Manitoba (Jones) 🔨	0	1	0	0	1	0	0	0	0	3	1	6
Ontario (Reid)	0	0	0	1	0	1	1	0	2	0	0	5

==== Draw 2 ====
Sheet B	1	2	3	4	5	6	7	8	9	10	Final
Newfoundland (Bartlett) 🔨	1	0	1	0	3	0	1	0	0	0	6
Quebec (Charette)	0	0	0	1	0	3	0	1	1	2	8

Sheet D	1	2	3	4	5	6	7	8	9	10	11	Final
Saskatchewan (Buglass)	0	2	0	2	0	1	0	0	1	1	0	7
Alberta (Turner) 🔨	3	0	1	0	1	0	1	1	0	0	1	8

Sheet F	1	2	3	4	5	6	7	8	9	10	Final
Northwest Territories/Yukon (Augustin)	2	1	0	1	0	1	1	0	2	X	8
Northern Ontario (Pula) 🔨	0	0	3	0	4	0	0	4	0	X	11

==== Draw 3 ====
Sheet A	1	2	3	4	5	6	7	8	9	10	Final
New Brunswick (Vaughan) 🔨	2	2	1	0	2	0	0	1	1	X	9
Nova Scotia (Martin)	0	0	0	1	0	1	2	0	0	X	4

Sheet C	1	2	3	4	5	6	7	8	9	10	Final
Ontario (Reid) 🔨	0	0	0	1	0	1	1	0	3	0	6
British Columbia (Gemmell)	0	1	0	0	4	0	0	2	0	1	8

Sheet E	1	2	3	4	5	6	7	8	9	10	Final
Manitoba (Jones) 🔨	1	0	0	3	0	0	2	0	0	X	6
Prince Edward Island (Nowlan)	0	0	1	0	1	0	0	1	0	X	3

==== Draw 4 ====
Sheet A	1	2	3	4	5	6	7	8	9	10	Final
Saskatchewan (Buglass) 🔨	0	1	0	4	0	1	1	0	4	X	11
Newfoundland (Bartlett)	0	0	0	0	2	0	0	1	0	X	3

Sheet C	1	2	3	4	5	6	7	8	9	10	Final
Northern Ontario (Pula) 🔨	1	0	0	0	1	0	2	0	1	X	5
Quebec (Charette)	0	1	1	1	0	4	0	2	0	X	9

Sheet E	1	2	3	4	5	6	7	8	9	10	Final
Northwest Territories/Yukon (Augustin) 🔨	0	0	0	0	0	0	1	0	X	X	1
Alberta (Turner)	1	1	2	1	2	1	0	5	X	X	13

==== Draw 5 ====
Sheet A	1	2	3	4	5	6	7	8	9	10	Final
Prince Edward Island (Nowlan) 🔨	0	2	0	0	1	0	2	1	0	0	6
Ontario (Reid)	2	0	2	2	0	1	0	0	1	2	10

Sheet C	1	2	3	4	5	6	7	8	9	10	Final
Nova Scotia (Martin) 🔨	2	0	2	0	0	1	0	0	X	X	5
Manitoba (Jones)	0	2	0	2	0	0	4	3	X	X	11

Sheet E	1	2	3	4	5	6	7	8	9	10	Final
British Columbia (Gemmell) 🔨	1	0	0	0	1	0	0	3	0	2	7
New Brunswick (Vaughan)	0	1	0	0	0	1	2	0	1	0	5

==== Draw 6 ====
Sheet A	1	2	3	4	5	6	7	8	9	10	Final
Alberta (Turner) 🔨	2	0	2	3	2	0	3	X	X	X	12
Northern Ontario (Pula)	0	1	0	0	0	2	0	X	X	X	3

Sheet C	1	2	3	4	5	6	7	8	9	10	Final
Newfoundland (Bartlett) 🔨	0	4	1	1	0	2	3	0	X	X	11
Northwest Territories/Yukon (Augustin)	1	0	0	0	1	0	0	1	X	X	3

Sheet E	1	2	3	4	5	6	7	8	9	10	Final
Quebec (Charette) 🔨	1	1	0	1	0	1	0	0	0	2	6
Saskatchewan (Buglass)	0	0	1	0	2	0	1	1	0	0	5

==== Draw 7 ====
Sheet B	1	2	3	4	5	6	7	8	9	10	Final
Northern Ontario (Pula) 🔨	1	0	2	0	3	0	1	0	3	X	10
Newfoundland (Bartlett)	0	0	0	1	0	1	0	2	0	X	4

Sheet D	1	2	3	4	5	6	7	8	9	10	Final
Northwest Territories/Yukon (Augustin) 🔨	1	0	0	0	3	0	0	X	X	X	4
Saskatchewan (Buglass)	0	4	1	1	0	6	3	X	X	X	15

Sheet F	1	2	3	4	5	6	7	8	9	10	Final
Alberta (Turner) 🔨	0	0	1	0	1	0	1	0	2	0	5
Quebec (Charette)	0	1	0	3	0	0	0	1	0	1	6

==== Draw 8 ====
Sheet B	1	2	3	4	5	6	7	8	9	10	Final
Ontario (Reid) 🔨	3	1	0	1	2	1	2	0	0	X	10
Nova Scotia (Martin)	0	0	2	0	0	0	0	3	4	X	9

Sheet D	1	2	3	4	5	6	7	8	9	10	Final
Prince Edward Island (Nowlan) 🔨	0	0	0	0	1	0	0	0	X	X	1
British Columbia (Gemmell)	0	1	2	1	0	1	1	3	X	X	9

Sheet F	1	2	3	4	5	6	7	8	9	10	Final
Manitoba (Jones) 🔨	0	1	0	3	1	0	1	1	0	X	7
New Brunswick (Vaughan)	0	0	1	0	0	1	0	0	1	X	3

==== Draw 9 ====
Sheet A	1	2	3	4	5	6	7	8	9	10	Final
Quebec (Charette) 🔨	2	0	3	0	0	3	0	2	1	X	11
Northwest Territories/Yukon (Augustin)	0	1	0	2	2	0	1	0	0	X	6

Sheet C	1	2	3	4	5	6	7	8	9	10	Final
Saskatchewan (Buglass) 🔨	0	1	0	4	1	0	3	0	3	X	12
Northern Ontario (Pula)	1	0	1	0	0	1	0	1	0	X	4

Sheet E	1	2	3	4	5	6	7	8	9	10	Final
Newfoundland (Bartlett) 🔨	0	0	0	0	2	0	0	1	0	X	3
Alberta (Turner)	2	1	1	2	0	1	1	0	2	X	10

==== Draw 10 ====
Sheet A	1	2	3	4	5	6	7	8	9	10	Final
British Columbia (Gemmell) 🔨	2	0	1	0	1	0	2	2	0	0	8
Manitoba (Jones)	0	2	0	4	0	2	0	0	0	1	9

Sheet C	1	2	3	4	5	6	7	8	9	10	Final
Nova Scotia (Martin) 🔨	3	1	0	2	0	0	2	0	2	1	11
Prince Edward Island (Nowlan)	0	0	3	0	1	1	0	4	0	0	9

Sheet E	1	2	3	4	5	6	7	8	9	10	Final
New Brunswick (Vaughan) 🔨	1	0	2	0	0	1	0	1	0	0	5
Ontario (Reid)	0	1	0	1	1	0	2	0	0	3	8

==== Draw 11 ====
Sheet A	1	2	3	4	5	6	7	8	9	10	Final
New Brunswick (Vaughan) 🔨	0	0	1	0	3	3	0	2	1	X	10
Newfoundland (Bartlett)	1	1	0	1	0	0	1	0	0	X	4

Sheet B	1	2	3	4	5	6	7	8	9	10	Final
Prince Edward Island (Nowlan) 🔨	0	4	2	2	0	0	1	0	1	1	11
Northwest Territories/Yukon (Augustin)	3	0	0	0	4	1	0	1	0	0	9

Sheet C	1	2	3	4	5	6	7	8	9	10	Final
British Columbia (Gemmell) 🔨	0	0	0	1	0	1	1	0	1	1	5
Alberta (Turner)	0	0	0	0	1	0	0	3	0	0	4

Sheet D	1	2	3	4	5	6	7	8	9	10	Final
Manitoba (Jones) 🔨	2	0	0	1	0	1	0	2	0	0	6
Northern Ontario (Pula)	0	2	2	0	1	0	1	0	1	1	8

Sheet E	1	2	3	4	5	6	7	8	9	10	Final
Nova Scotia (Martin) 🔨	1	1	0	0	1	0	0	0	2	X	5
Quebec (Charette)	0	0	3	2	0	0	1	2	0	X	8

Sheet F	1	2	3	4	5	6	7	8	9	10	Final
Ontario (Reid) 🔨	2	0	1	0	0	1	0	2	0	3	9
Saskatchewan (Buglass)	0	1	0	1	2	0	3	0	1	0	8

==== Draw 12 ====
Sheet A	1	2	3	4	5	6	7	8	9	10	Final
Northwest Territories/Yukon (Augustin) 🔨	0	0	0	0	0	X	X	X	X	X	0
Manitoba (Jones)	4	2	4	1	3	X	X	X	X	X	14

Sheet B	1	2	3	4	5	6	7	8	9	10	Final
Newfoundland (Bartlett) 🔨	1	1	0	1	2	0	2	0	1	X	8
Nova Scotia (Martin)	0	0	0	0	0	4	0	1	0	X	5

Sheet C	1	2	3	4	5	6	7	8	9	10	Final
Saskatchewan (Buglass) 🔨	0	3	2	0	0	1	0	1	0	1	8
New Brunswick (Vaughan)	0	0	0	1	2	0	2	0	2	0	7

Sheet D	1	2	3	4	5	6	7	8	9	10	Final
Alberta (Turner) 🔨	0	0	2	0	2	2	0	0	2	0	8
Prince Edward Island (Nowlan)	1	1	0	1	0	0	1	1	0	4	9

Sheet E	1	2	3	4	5	6	7	8	9	10	Final
Northern Ontario (Pula) 🔨	0	1	0	0	1	0	X	X	X	X	2
Ontario (Reid)	1	0	5	2	0	3	X	X	X	X	11

Sheet F	1	2	3	4	5	6	7	8	9	10	Final
Quebec (Charette) 🔨	0	0	1	0	0	0	1	0	0	2	4
British Columbia (Gemmell)	0	0	0	1	0	0	0	1	1	0	3

==== Draw 13 ====
Sheet A	1	2	3	4	5	6	7	8	9	10	Final
Nova Scotia (Martin) 🔨	0	1	1	0	0	2	1	0	0	X	5
Alberta (Turner)	1	0	0	1	2	0	0	3	1	X	8

Sheet B	1	2	3	4	5	6	7	8	9	10	Final
Manitoba (Jones) 🔨	1	0	2	0	1	0	0	0	0	X	4
Saskatchewan (Buglass)	0	1	0	1	0	2	2	1	2	X	9

Sheet C	1	2	3	4	5	6	7	8	9	10	Final
Prince Edward Island (Nowlan) 🔨	0	2	0	1	0	0	0	1	X	X	4
Quebec (Charette)	4	0	3	0	1	1	1	0	X	X	10

Sheet D	1	2	3	4	5	6	7	8	9	10	Final
Ontario (Reid) 🔨	2	1	0	1	0	0	0	1	0	0	5
Newfoundland (Bartlett)	0	0	1	0	0	2	0	0	1	2	6

Sheet E	1	2	3	4	5	6	7	8	9	10	Final
British Columbia (Gemmell) 🔨	2	4	2	1	1	0	X	X	X	X	10
Northwest Territories/Yukon (Augustin)	0	0	0	0	0	1	X	X	X	X	1

Sheet F	1	2	3	4	5	6	7	8	9	10	Final
New Brunswick (Vaughan) 🔨	3	0	1	2	4	0	2	0	3	X	15
Northern Ontario (Pula)	0	3	0	0	0	1	0	2	0	X	6

==== Draw 14 ====
Sheet A	1	2	3	4	5	6	7	8	9	10	Final
Quebec (Charette) 🔨	0	0	1	0	1	0	0	0	1	X	3
Ontario (Reid)	0	1	0	1	0	0	2	3	0	X	7

Sheet B	1	2	3	4	5	6	7	8	9	10	Final
Northern Ontario (Pula) 🔨	3	0	0	1	2	0	0	0	1	0	7
British Columbia (Gemmell)	0	0	2	0	0	2	2	0	0	5	11

Sheet C	1	2	3	4	5	6	7	8	9	10	Final
Newfoundland (Bartlett) 🔨	0	2	0	0	0	0	0	1	0	0	3
Manitoba (Jones)	0	0	1	0	0	1	1	0	0	1	4

Sheet D	1	2	3	4	5	6	7	8	9	10	Final
Alberta (Turner) 🔨	0	1	0	0	0	0	1	0	1	X	3
New Brunswick (Vaughan)	1	0	1	1	3	1	0	1	0	X	8

Sheet E	1	2	3	4	5	6	7	8	9	10	Final
Saskatchewan (Buglass) 🔨	1	0	3	0	1	1	2	0	2	X	10
Prince Edward Island (Nowlan)	0	2	0	1	0	0	0	3	0	X	6

Sheet F	1	2	3	4	5	6	7	8	9	10	Final
Northwest Territories/Yukon (Augustin) 🔨	0	1	1	0	0	0	1	0	0	X	3
Nova Scotia (Martin)	3	0	0	1	2	1	0	1	1	X	9

==== Draw 15 ====
Sheet A	1	2	3	4	5	6	7	8	9	10	Final
British Columbia (Gemmell) 🔨	0	0	0	0	0	0	0	1	0	X	1
Saskatchewan (Buglass)	0	0	0	0	2	2	2	0	2	X	8

Sheet B	1	2	3	4	5	6	7	8	9	10	Final
New Brunswick (Vaughan) 🔨	2	0	3	2	1	0	6	X	X	X	14
Northwest Territories/Yukon (Augustin)	0	1	0	0	0	2	0	X	X	X	3

Sheet C	1	2	3	4	5	6	7	8	9	10	Final
Ontario (Reid) 🔨	0	1	0	1	0	2	1	2	0	0	7
Alberta (Turner)	3	0	2	0	2	0	0	0	1	3	11

Sheet D	1	2	3	4	5	6	7	8	9	10	Final
Manitoba (Jones) 🔨	0	0	1	0	0	0	X	X	X	X	1
Quebec (Charette)	2	0	0	1	1	5	X	X	X	X	9

Sheet E	1	2	3	4	5	6	7	8	9	10	Final
Nova Scotia (Martin) 🔨	0	0	0	1	0	2	1	0	1	0	5
Northern Ontario (Pula)	0	1	1	0	1	0	0	2	0	3	8

Sheet F	1	2	3	4	5	6	7	8	9	10	Final
Prince Edward Island (Nowlan) 🔨	3	0	1	2	0	0	0	1	0	0	7
Newfoundland (Bartlett)	0	2	0	0	1	1	1	0	3	1	9

==== Draw 16 ====
Sheet A	1	2	3	4	5	6	7	8	9	10	Final
Northern Ontario (Pula) 🔨	0	0	2	0	1	0	0	0	X	X	3
Prince Edward Island (Nowlan)	2	1	0	3	0	2	1	1	X	X	10

Sheet B	1	2	3	4	5	6	7	8	9	10	Final
Alberta (Turner) 🔨	2	2	0	1	0	1	0	5	0	X	11
Manitoba (Jones)	0	0	2	0	1	0	3	0	1	X	7

Sheet C	1	2	3	4	5	6	7	8	9	10	Final
Quebec (Charette) 🔨	1	0	1	0	0	1	0	1	0	X	4
New Brunswick (Vaughan)	0	2	0	1	0	0	1	0	3	X	7

Sheet D	1	2	3	4	5	6	7	8	9	10	Final
Northwest Territories/Yukon (Augustin) 🔨	0	0	1	0	3	0	X	X	X	X	4
Ontario (Reid)	2	4	0	3	0	5	X	X	X	X	14

Sheet E	1	2	3	4	5	6	7	8	9	10	Final
Newfoundland (Bartlett) 🔨	0	0	0	1	0	X	X	X	X	X	1
British Columbia (Gemmell)	4	2	1	0	5	X	X	X	X	X	12

Sheet F	1	2	3	4	5	6	7	8	9	10	11	Final
Saskatchewan (Buglass) 🔨	1	0	0	3	0	1	0	2	1	0	1	9
Nova Scotia (Martin)	0	3	2	0	1	0	1	0	0	1	0	8

=== Playoffs ===
Semifinal		Final
Saskatchewan	5
British Columbia	12	Quebec	6
		British Columbia	4

==== Semifinal ====
Sheet D	1	2	3	4	5	6	7	8	9	10	Final
Saskatchewan (Buglass) 🔨	2	0	1	0	0	0	2	0	X	X	5
British Columbia (Gemmell)	0	2	0	4	0	4	0	2	X	X	12

Player percentages
Saskatchewan		British Columbia	
Lori Harvie	64%	Jean McKenzie	77%
Gay Mudrey	67%	Linda Vanderlinde	80%
Sharon Fyke	61%	Verna Sivucha	52%
Pat Buglass	47%	Maymar Gemmell	67%
Total	60%	Total	69%

==== Final ====
Sheet C	1	2	3	4	5	6	7	8	9	10	Final
Quebec (Charette) 🔨	0	1	0	0	0	2	0	1	0	2	6
British Columbia (Gemmell)	0	0	0	1	2	0	0	0	1	0	4

Player percentages
Quebec		British Columbia	
Mary Anne Robertson	73%	Jean McKenzie	84%
Lois Baines	81%	Linda Vanderlinde	64%
Martha Don	78%	Verna Sivucha	63%
Agnes Charette	63%	Maymar Gemmell	84%
Total	73%	Total	73%
