= 1997 Canadian Senior Curling Championships =

- Host city: Thornhill, Ontario
- Arena: Thornhill Golf and Country Club
- Dates: January 25–February 2, 1997
- Men's winner: Ontario
- Skip: Bob Turcotte
- Third: Roy Weigand
- Second: Bob Lichti
- Lead: Steve McDermot
- Finalist: Saskatchewan
- Women's winner: Quebec
- Skip: Agnes Charette
- Third: Martha Don
- Second: Lois Baines
- Lead: Mary Anne Robertson
- Finalist: Ontario

The 1997 CIBC Canadian Senior Curling Championships were held January 25 to February 2 at the Thornhill Golf and Country Club in Thornhill, Ontario.

== Men's ==
=== Teams ===
Province / Territory	Skip	Third	Second	Lead
Alberta	Harold Breckenridge	Jim McDonald	Dennis Balderston	Bill Vermette
British Columbia	Wayne Matthewson	Jack Finnbogason	Bob Byrne	Fuji Miki
Manitoba	Len Jackson	Martin Bailey	Gary Smith	Don Ediger
Newfoundland	Damien Ryan	Roger Mabey	Lew Andrews	Doug Hudson
Northern Ontario	Bill Johnston	Gord McKnight	Reg Gardner	Terry Thib
Nova Scotia	Haylett Clarke	John McNaughton	Cecil McIver	John Marshall
Ontario	Bob Turcotte	Roy Weigand	Bob Lichti	Steve McDermot
Prince Edward Island	Wayne Gardiner	Fred Hiscock	Louis Nowlan	Raymond Thomson
Quebec	Bob Albert	Michel St. Onge	Claude Bouchard	Rene Careau
Saskatchewan	Murray Eddy	Dave Moore	Nestor Richkun	Bill Postlewaite
New Brunswick	Glen Mawhinney	James Shephard	Lloyd McKinley	Leo Majeau
Northwest Territories/Yukon	Henry Lefebvre	Ron Cook	Harry Lawrence	Gerry Goudreau

=== Standings ===
Locale	Skip	W	L
Ontario	Bob Turcotte	11	0
Saskatchewan	Murray Eddy	8	3
Alberta	Doug McClelland	7	4
Newfoundland	Damien Ryan	7	4
Northern Ontario	Bill Johnston	6	5
British Columbia	Wayne Matthewson	5	6
Manitoba	Len Jackson	5	6
Nova Scotia	Haylett Clarke	4	7
New Brunswick	Glen Mawhinney	4	7
Prince Edward Island	Wayne Gardiner	3	8
Northwest Territories/Yukon	Henry Lefebvre	3	8
Quebec	Bob Albert	3	8

=== Results ===
==== Draw 2 ====
Sheet A	1	2	3	4	5	6	7	8	9	10	Final
New Brunswick (Mawhinney)	0	0	2	0	2	0	0	1	1	X	6
Saskatchewan (Eddy)	0	0	0	1	0	1	1	0	0	X	3

Sheet B	1	2	3	4	5	6	7	8	9	10	Final
Prince Edward Island (Gardiner)	0	0	3	0	1	0	1	0	0	X	5
Alberta (Breckenridge)	0	1	0	2	0	3	0	0	2	X	8

Sheet C	1	2	3	4	5	6	7	8	9	10	Final
Ontario (Turcotte)	1	0	1	0	2	0	0	1	0	1	6
Nova Scotia (Clarke)	0	0	0	2	0	0	2	0	0	0	4

Sheet D	1	2	3	4	5	6	7	8	9	10	Final
British Columbia (Matthewson)	2	0	0	0	1	0	0	0	2	X	5
Manitoba (Jackson)	0	0	1	0	0	0	0	1	0	X	2

Sheet E	1	2	3	4	5	6	7	8	9	10	Final
Northern Ontario (Johnston)	1	0	0	0	2	0	0	2	1	0	6
Northwest Territories/Yukon (Lefebvre)	0	1	1	1	0	2	1	0	0	1	7

Sheet F	1	2	3	4	5	6	7	8	9	10	Final
Newfoundland (Ryan)	1	0	3	0	1	1	0	2	X	X	8
Quebec (Albert)	0	0	0	1	0	0	1	0	X	X	2

==== Draw 3 ====
Sheet A	1	2	3	4	5	6	7	8	9	10	Final
Newfoundland (Ryan)	2	0	1	0	2	0	1	0	2	2	10
Northwest Territories/Yukon (Lefebvre)	0	1	0	1	0	3	0	1	0	0	6

Sheet B	1	2	3	4	5	6	7	8	9	10	Final
Northern Ontario (Johnston)	2	0	1	0	3	0	2	0	0	1	9
British Columbia (Matthewson)	0	1	0	2	0	1	0	2	1	0	7

Sheet C	1	2	3	4	5	6	7	8	9	10	Final
Manitoba (Jackson)	1	1	2	0	0	0	0	2	0	1	7
Nova Scotia (Clarke)	0	0	0	1	1	1	0	0	2	0	5

Sheet D	1	2	3	4	5	6	7	8	9	10	Final
Ontario (Turcotte)	2	0	4	0	1	1	1	0	1	X	10
Prince Edward Island (Gardiner)	0	1	0	3	0	0	0	2	0	X	6

Sheet E	1	2	3	4	5	6	7	8	9	10	Final
Quebec (Albert)	0	0	0	2	0	1	0	0	1	X	4
Saskatchewan (Eddy)	0	1	2	0	2	0	1	1	0	X	7

Sheet F	1	2	3	4	5	6	7	8	9	10	Final
Alberta (Breckenridge)	0	0	2	0	2	0	0	1	1	X	6
New Brunswick (Mawhinney)	0	1	0	1	0	0	1	0	0	X	3

==== Draw 5 ====
Sheet A	1	2	3	4	5	6	7	8	9	10	Final
New Brunswick (Mawhinney)	2	0	0	2	0	1	0	1	X	X	6
Ontario (Turcotte)	0	4	3	0	2	0	2	0	X	X	11

Sheet B	1	2	3	4	5	6	7	8	9	10	Final
Saskatchewan (Eddy)	1	0	0	0	1	0	2	1	1	X	6
Alberta (Breckenridge)	0	0	0	1	0	1	0	0	0	X	2

Sheet C	1	2	3	4	5	6	7	8	9	10	Final
Prince Edward Island (Gardiner)	0	1	0	1	0	1	0	0	0	X	3
Manitoba (Jackson)	0	0	2	0	2	0	1	2	0	X	7

Sheet D	1	2	3	4	5	6	7	8	9	10	Final
Nova Scotia (Clarke)	3	0	0	1	0	2	0	3	0	X	9
Northern Ontario (Johnston)	0	2	0	0	1	0	1	0	1	X	5

Sheet E	1	2	3	4	5	6	7	8	9	10	Final
British Columbia (Matthewson)	1	0	0	1	0	2	0	2	0	0	6
Newfoundland (Ryan)	0	2	1	0	1	0	2	0	1	2	9

Sheet F	1	2	3	4	5	6	7	8	9	10	Final
Northwest Territories/Yukon (Lefebvre)	1	0	4	1	1	2	0	2	X	X	11
Quebec (Albert)	0	1	0	0	0	0	3	0	X	X	4

==== Draw 8 ====
Sheet A	1	2	3	4	5	6	7	8	9	10	Final
Quebec (Albert)	1	0	0	1	1	0	2	0	2	1	8
British Columbia (Matthewson)	0	3	0	0	0	1	0	2	0	0	6

Sheet B	1	2	3	4	5	6	7	8	9	10	Final
Newfoundland (Ryan)	3	0	1	0	0	3	2	0	X	X	9
Nova Scotia (Clarke)	0	2	0	0	1	0	0	1	X	X	4

Sheet C	1	2	3	4	5	6	7	8	9	10	Final
Northern Ontario (Johnston)	1	2	0	0	1	0	3	0	0	0	7
Prince Edward Island (Gardiner)	0	0	0	2	0	1	0	1	1	1	6

Sheet D	1	2	3	4	5	6	7	8	9	10	Final
Northwest Territories/Yukon (Lefebvre)	0	0	2	0	0	1	0	1	1	0	5
Saskatchewan (Eddy)	0	2	0	2	0	0	2	0	0	1	7

Sheet E	1	2	3	4	5	6	7	8	9	10	Final
Manitoba (Jackson)	1	0	0	0	0	1	0	1	0	0	3
New Brunswick (Mawhinney)	0	1	0	0	0	0	1	0	0	3	5

Sheet F	1	2	3	4	5	6	7	8	9	10	Final
Ontario (Turcotte)	1	0	1	1	1	0	0	0	2	X	6
Alberta (Breckenridge)	0	2	0	0	0	1	0	1	0	X	4

==== Draw 10 ====
Sheet A	1	2	3	4	5	6	7	8	9	10	Final
Alberta (Breckenridge)	0	1	0	1	0	1	0	1	0	0	4
Manitoba (Jackson)	0	0	1	0	3	0	1	0	1	0	6

Sheet B	1	2	3	4	5	6	7	8	9	10	Final
New Brunswick (Mawhinney)	2	0	1	0	1	0	2	0	3	0	9
Northern Ontario (Johnston)	0	3	0	2	0	2	0	2	0	1	10

Sheet C	1	2	3	4	5	6	7	8	9	10	Final
Saskatchewan (Eddy)	1	0	0	1	0	1	0	1	0	X	4
Ontario (Turcotte)	0	2	2	0	2	0	1	0	1	X	8

Sheet D	1	2	3	4	5	6	7	8	9	10	Final
Prince Edward Island (Gardiner)	0	0	1	0	0	0	1	2	1	X	5
Newfoundland (Ryan)	1	1	0	3	1	3	0	0	0	X	9

Sheet E	1	2	3	4	5	6	7	8	9	10	Final
Nova Scotia (Clarke)	0	0	1	0	4	0	0	0	1	1	7
Quebec (Albert)	0	1	0	2	0	1	2	2	0	0	8

Sheet F	1	2	3	4	5	6	7	8	9	10	Final
British Columbia (Matthewson)	1	1	0	2	0	1	1	2	X	X	8
Northwest Territories/Yukon (Lefebvre)	0	0	1	0	1	0	0	0	X	X	2

==== Draw 11 ====
Sheet A	1	2	3	4	5	6	7	8	9	10	Final
Northwest Territories/Yukon (Lefebvre)	0	0	1	0	0	0	0	1	1	X	3
Nova Scotia (Clarke)	0	1	0	0	1	2	1	0	0	X	5

Sheet B	1	2	3	4	5	6	7	8	9	10	Final
Quebec (Albert)	2	0	2	1	1	0	0	0	0	0	6
Prince Edward Island (Gardiner)	0	4	0	0	0	1	0	0	2	1	8

Sheet C	1	2	3	4	5	6	7	8	9	10	Final
British Columbia (Matthewson)	0	1	0	1	0	0	0	2	0	1	5
Saskatchewan (Eddy)	0	0	1	0	0	1	1	0	1	0	4

Sheet D	1	2	3	4	5	6	7	8	9	10	Final
Newfoundland (Ryan)	2	0	1	0	4	0	1	0	0	X	8
New Brunswick (Mawhinney)	0	1	0	1	0	1	0	2	1	X	6

Sheet E	1	2	3	4	5	6	7	8	9	10	Final
Northern Ontario (Johnston)	2	0	1	1	1	0	2	0	2	X	9
Alberta (Breckenridge)	0	4	0	0	0	2	0	0	0	X	6

Sheet F	1	2	3	4	5	6	7	8	9	10	Final
Manitoba (Jackson)	1	0	1	2	0	0	1	0	1	0	6
Ontario (Turcotte)	0	2	0	0	2	1	0	3	0	1	9

==== Draw 13 ====
Sheet A	1	2	3	4	5	6	7	8	9	10	Final
Ontario (Turcotte)	0	0	2	0	0	0	2	0	5	X	9
Northern Ontario (Johnston)	1	0	0	0	2	1	0	1	0	X	5

Sheet B	1	2	3	4	5	6	7	8	9	10	Final
Alberta (Breckenridge)	0	1	0	0	1	0	1	1	0	3	7
Newfoundland (Ryan)	0	0	0	1	0	2	0	0	1	0	4

Sheet C	1	2	3	4	5	6	7	8	9	10	Final
New Brunswick (Mawhinney)	0	0	0	2	0	0	3	0	4	X	9
Quebec (Albert)	0	0	0	0	1	2	0	0	0	X	3

Sheet D	1	2	3	4	5	6	7	8	9	10	Final
Saskatchewan (Eddy)	1	0	3	0	1	0	0	1	0	1	7
Manitoba (Jackson)	0	1	0	1	0	1	1	0	1	0	5

Sheet E	1	2	3	4	5	6	7	8	9	10	Final
Prince Edward Island (Gardiner)	1	0	0	0	0	1	0	0	2	1	5
Northwest Territories/Yukon (Lefebvre)	0	1	1	0	1	0	0	1	0	0	4

Sheet F	1	2	3	4	5	6	7	8	9	10	Final
Nova Scotia (Clarke)	1	1	0	0	0	1	0	2	0	X	5
British Columbia (Matthewson)	0	0	1	0	0	0	1	0	2	X	4

==== Draw 16 ====
Sheet A	1	2	3	4	5	6	7	8	9	10	Final
British Columbia (Matthewson)	2	1	0	0	0	0	3	0	0	X	6
Prince Edward Island (Gardiner)	0	0	1	1	0	0	0	2	0	X	4

Sheet B	1	2	3	4	5	6	7	8	9	10	Final
Nova Scotia (Clarke)	0	1	0	1	0	0	1	0	1	0	4
Saskatchewan (Eddy)	1	0	1	0	1	0	0	3	0	0	6

Sheet C	1	2	3	4	5	6	7	8	9	10	11	Final
Northwest Territories/Yukon (Lefebvre)	1	0	0	1	0	1	0	0	2	1	1	7
New Brunswick (Mawhinney)	0	2	2	0	0	0	1	1	0	0	0	6

Sheet D	1	2	3	4	5	6	7	8	9	10	Final
Quebec (Albert)	0	2	0	0	0	0	2	0	0	0	4
Alberta (Breckenridge)	1	0	0	2	1	0	0	0	1	2	7

Sheet E	1	2	3	4	5	6	7	8	9	10	Final
Newfoundland (Ryan)	1	0	0	0	1	0	2	0	X	X	4
Ontario (Turcotte)	0	0	1	2	0	3	0	3	X	X	9

Sheet F	1	2	3	4	5	6	7	8	9	10	Final
Northern Ontario (Johnston)	1	0	0	0	0	2	0	2	1	X	6
Manitoba (Jackson)	0	0	0	0	2	0	1	0	0	X	3

==== Draw 18 ====
Sheet A	1	2	3	4	5	6	7	8	9	10	Final
Manitoba (Jackson)	1	0	0	0	0	1	0	1	0	X	3
Newfoundland (Ryan)	0	1	1	0	0	0	2	0	3	X	7

Sheet B	1	2	3	4	5	6	7	8	9	10	Final
Ontario (Turcotte)	2	0	0	1	1	0	4	0	X	X	8
Quebec (Albert)	0	1	1	0	0	1	0	1	X	X	4

Sheet C	1	2	3	4	5	6	7	8	9	10	Final
Alberta (Breckenridge)	0	0	2	1	0	1	1	4	X	X	9
Northwest Territories/Yukon (Lefebvre)	0	1	0	0	1	0	0	0	X	X	2

Sheet D	1	2	3	4	5	6	7	8	9	10	Final
New Brunswick (Mawhinney)	2	0	1	0	2	0	1	0	0	0	6
British Columbia (Matthewson)	0	1	0	2	0	2	0	1	1	1	8

Sheet E	1	2	3	4	5	6	7	8	9	10	Final
Saskatchewan (Eddy)	0	1	0	2	0	0	2	0	2	X	7
Northern Ontario (Johnston)	0	0	2	0	1	0	0	1	0	X	4

Sheet F	1	2	3	4	5	6	7	8	9	10	Final
Prince Edward Island (Gardiner)	0	1	4	0	0	2	0	3	X	X	10
Nova Scotia (Clarke)	1	0	0	1	0	0	2	0	X	X	4

==== Draw 20 ====
Sheet A	1	2	3	4	5	6	7	8	9	10	Final
Prince Edward Island (Gardiner)	0	1	0	1	0	1	0	0	2	0	5
Saskatchewan (Eddy)	0	0	2	0	2	0	0	1	0	2	7

Sheet B	1	2	3	4	5	6	7	8	9	10	Final
Nova Scotia (Clarke)	0	0	1	0	2	1	1	0	1	X	6
New Brunswick (Mawhinney)	0	0	0	1	0	0	0	2	0	X	3

Sheet C	1	2	3	4	5	6	7	8	9	10	11	Final
Newfoundland (Ryan)	2	1	0	0	1	0	2	0	1	0	0	7
Northern Ontario (Johnston)	0	0	1	1	0	1	0	3	0	1	2	9

Sheet D	1	2	3	4	5	6	7	8	9	10	Final
Northwest Territories/Yukon (Lefebvre)	0	1	1	1	1	0	0	0	2	0	6
Ontario (Turcotte)	1	0	0	0	0	3	1	1	0	1	7

Sheet E	1	2	3	4	5	6	7	8	9	10	Final
British Columbia (Matthewson)	1	0	1	1	1	0	0	0	2	X	6
Alberta (Breckenridge)	0	4	0	0	0	3	0	2	0	X	9

Sheet F	1	2	3	4	5	6	7	8	9	10	Final
Quebec (Albert)	1	0	0	1	0	0	1	1	0	X	4
Manitoba (Jackson)	0	1	1	0	2	1	0	0	3	X	8

==== Draw 22 ====
Sheet A	1	2	3	4	5	6	7	8	9	10	Final
Northern Ontario (Johnston)	0	0	1	0	0	1	0	1	1	X	4
Quebec (Albert)	1	2	0	2	2	0	1	0	0	X	8

Sheet B	1	2	3	4	5	6	7	8	9	10	Final
Manitoba (Jackson)	1	0	0	0	0	0	3	1	1	X	6
Northwest Territories/Yukon (Lefebvre)	0	0	1	1	1	1	0	0	0	X	4

Sheet C	1	2	3	4	5	6	7	8	9	10	Final
Ontario (Turcotte)	1	0	2	0	2	0	3	0	1	X	9
British Columbia (Matthewson)	0	2	0	2	0	2	0	1	0	X	7

Sheet D	1	2	3	4	5	6	7	8	9	10	Final
Alberta (Breckenridge)	1	0	0	0	2	0	0	3	0	X	6
Nova Scotia (Clarke)	0	1	0	0	0	0	1	0	1	X	3

Sheet E	1	2	3	4	5	6	7	8	9	10	Final
New Brunswick (Mawhinney)	0	2	2	0	0	1	0	2	1	X	8
Prince Edward Island (Gardiner)	0	0	0	2	2	0	1	0	0	X	5

Sheet F	1	2	3	4	5	6	7	8	9	10	Final
Saskatchewan (Eddy)	2	0	4	0	1	0	1	2	X	X	10
Newfoundland (Ryan)	0	1	0	2	0	2	0	0	X	X	5

=== Playoffs ===
Tiebreaker		Semifinal		Final
Alberta	5
Newfoundland	6	Saskatchewan	8
		Newfoundland	7
				Ontario	7
				Saskatchewan	4

==== Tiebreaker ====
Sheet C	1	2	3	4	5	6	7	8	9	10	Final
Alberta (Breckenridge)	1	0	0	3	0	0	0	0	1	0	5
Newfoundland (Ryan)	0	1	0	0	2	1	0	0	0	2	6

Player percentages
Alberta		Newfoundland	
Bill Vermette	78%	Doug Hudson	89%
Dennis Balderston	84%	Lew Andrews	84%
Jim MacDonald	88%	Roger Mabey	79%
Harold Breckenridge	91%	Damien Ryan	91%
Total	85%	Total	86%

==== Semifinal ====
Sheet E	1	2	3	4	5	6	7	8	9	10	Final
Saskatchewan (Eddy)	0	1	0	3	0	0	1	1	0	2	8
Newfoundland (Ryan)	1	0	3	0	1	0	0	0	2	0	7

Player percentages
Saskatchewan		Newfoundland	
Bill Postlewaite	86%	Doug Hudson	74%
Nestor Richkun	83%	Lew Andrews	74%
Dave Moore	91%	Roger Mabey	78%
Murray Eddy	70%	Damien Ryan	68%
Total	83%	Total	73%

==== Final ====
Sheet C	1	2	3	4	5	6	7	8	9	10	Final
Ontario (Turcotte)	0	1	0	1	0	1	1	0	2	1	7
Saskatchewan (Eddy)	2	0	0	0	1	0	0	1	0	0	4

Player percentages
Ontario		Saskatchewan	
Steve McDermot	78%	Bill Postlewaite	81%
Bob Lichti	68%	Nestor Richkun	70%
Roy Weigand	76%	Dave Moore	78%
Bob Turcotte	80%	Murray Eddy	60%
Total	75%	Total	72%

== Women's ==
=== Teams ===
Province / Territory	Skip	Third	Second	Lead
Alberta	Sandy Turner	Arlene Sali	Marilyn Toews	Darlene Breckenridge
British Columbia	Eve Skakun	Janice Latta	Kay Belanger	Una Hazen
Manitoba	Elaine Jones	Anne Wright	Ina Light	Doreen Milhausen
New Brunswick	Karen McDermott	Pat Maher	Shirley Jamieson	Gisele Shaw
Newfoundland	Sue Anne Bartlett	Jean Rockwell	Betty McLean	Gertrude Peck
Northern Ontario	Pat Dayes	Doreen McLuhan	Helen Marson	Willow Watson
Nova Scotia	Adine Boutilier	Shirley Pace	Sharon Johnson	Florie Currie
Ontario	Jill Greenwood	Yvonne Smith	Gloria Campbell	Vicki Lauder
Prince Edward Island	Judie Goulden	Janice Shepard	Kay Elliott	Gail Jenkins
Quebec	Agnes Charette	Martha Don	Lois Baines	Mary Anne Robertson
Saskatchewan	Crystal Frisk	Maureen Carter	Myrna Graham	Maxine Rystephanick
Yukon/Northwest Territories	Jeanne Hagen	Elaine Gee	Phyllis Fiendell	Merton Friesen

=== Standings ===
Locale	Skip	W	L
Quebec	Agnes Charette	9	2
Saskatchewan	Crystal Frisk	8	3
Ontario	Jill Greenwood	8	3
British Columbia	Eve Skakun	7	4
Alberta	Sandy Turner	7	4
Newfoundland	Sue Anne Bartlett	7	4
Manitoba	Elaine Jones	5	6
Northern Ontario	Pat Dayes	5	6
New Brunswick	Karen McDermott	4	7
Nova Scotia	Adine Boutilier	4	7
Prince Edward Island	Judie Goulden	2	9
Yukon/Northwest Territories	Jeanne Hagen	0	11

=== Results ===
==== Draw 1 ====
Sheet A	1	2	3	4	5	6	7	8	9	10	Final
Yukon/Northwest Territories (Hagen)	0	1	0	1	0	2	0	0	0	3	7
Prince Edward Island (Goulden)	1	0	1	0	3	0	2	1	1	0	9

Sheet B	1	2	3	4	5	6	7	8	9	10	Final
Nova Scotia (Boutilier)	1	1	0	0	1	0	1	0	2	X	6
Quebec (Charette)	0	0	2	1	0	3	0	1	0	X	7

Sheet C	1	2	3	4	5	6	7	8	9	10	Final
Ontario (Greenwood)	0	2	0	0	1	0	2	0	0	1	6
British Columbia (Skakun)	0	0	0	1	0	2	0	1	0	0	4

Sheet D	1	2	3	4	5	6	7	8	9	10	Final
Manitoba (Jones)	0	2	0	0	1	0	2	0	1	X	6
Saskatchewan (Frisk)	0	0	3	2	0	2	0	2	0	X	9

Sheet E	1	2	3	4	5	6	7	8	9	10	Final
Alberta (Turner)	0	0	0	1	1	1	0	3	0	1	7
Newfoundland (Bartlett)	1	1	1	0	0	0	1	0	2	0	6

Sheet F	1	2	3	4	5	6	7	8	9	10	Final
Northern Ontario (Dayes)	2	0	2	2	0	0	2	0	0	1	9
New Brunswick (McDermott)	0	1	0	0	2	2	0	2	1	0	8

==== Draw 4 ====
Sheet A	1	2	3	4	5	6	7	8	9	10	11	Final
Northern Ontario (Dayes)	0	0	1	0	4	0	3	0	2	0	1	11
Newfoundland (Bartlett)	2	1	0	3	0	1	0	2	0	1	0	10

Sheet B	1	2	3	4	5	6	7	8	9	10	11	Final
Alberta (Turner)	0	1	0	0	3	0	1	0	2	0	0	7
Manitoba (Jones)	0	0	2	0	0	1	0	2	0	2	1	8

Sheet C	1	2	3	4	5	6	7	8	9	10	Final
Saskatchewan (Frisk)	0	2	0	0	1	1	0	2	0	1	7
Ontario (Greenwood)	1	0	0	1	0	0	1	0	1	0	4

Sheet D	1	2	3	4	5	6	7	8	9	10	Final
British Columbia (Skakun)	1	0	0	1	0	1	0	X	X	X	3
Quebec (Charette)	0	2	0	0	3	0	3	X	X	X	8

Sheet E	1	2	3	4	5	6	7	8	9	10	11	Final
New Brunswick (McDermott)	0	2	0	0	1	0	1	2	0	0	0	6
Prince Edward Island (Goulden)	1	0	1	2	0	1	0	0	0	1	1	7

Sheet F	1	2	3	4	5	6	7	8	9	10	Final
Nova Scotia (Boutilier)	0	4	0	1	0	2	0	0	0	1	8
Yukon/Northwest Territories (Hagen)	1	0	1	0	1	0	0	3	1	0	7

==== Draw 6 ====
Sheet A	1	2	3	4	5	6	7	8	9	10	Final
Yukon/Northwest Territories (Hagen)	0	1	0	2	0	1	0	0	0	X	4
British Columbia (Skakun)	2	0	2	0	1	0	2	2	1	X	10

Sheet B	1	2	3	4	5	6	7	8	9	10	Final
Prince Edward Island (Goulden)	1	2	0	0	2	0	0	0	2	0	7
Nova Scotia (Boutilier)	0	0	1	1	0	4	0	3	0	1	10

Sheet C	1	2	3	4	5	6	7	8	9	10	Final
Quebec (Charette)	0	0	1	0	0	2	0	2	2	X	7
Saskatchewan (Frisk)	1	0	0	1	0	0	2	0	0	X	4

Sheet D	1	2	3	4	5	6	7	8	9	10	Final
Ontario (Greenwood)	1	1	1	0	1	0	2	2	0	X	8
Alberta (Turner)	0	0	0	2	0	1	0	0	3	X	6

Sheet E	1	2	3	4	5	6	7	8	9	10	Final
Manitoba (Jones)	3	0	2	1	1	0	0	2	2	X	11
Northern Ontario (Dayes)	0	2	0	0	0	1	1	0	0	X	4

Sheet F	1	2	3	4	5	6	7	8	9	10	Final
Newfoundland (Bartlett)	1	2	0	2	0	0	0	1	0	X	6
New Brunswick (McDermott)	0	0	1	0	0	1	0	0	2	X	4

==== Draw 7 ====
Sheet A	1	2	3	4	5	6	7	8	9	10	Final
New Brunswick (McDermott)	2	1	0	0	1	0	3	1	0	X	8
Manitoba (Jones)	0	0	0	2	0	1	0	0	1	X	4

Sheet B	1	2	3	4	5	6	7	8	9	10	Final
Northern Ontario (Dayes)	1	0	1	0	1	0	0	2	0	1	6
Ontario (Greenwood)	0	2	0	1	0	1	0	0	1	0	5

Sheet C	1	2	3	4	5	6	7	8	9	10	Final
Alberta (Turner)	0	1	1	0	1	0	0	1	0	X	4
Quebec (Charette)	1	0	0	2	0	1	1	0	1	X	6

Sheet D	1	2	3	4	5	6	7	8	9	10	Final
Newfoundland (Bartlett)	2	2	0	0	0	4	1	0	X	X	9
Prince Edward Island (Goulden)	0	0	1	1	0	0	0	1	X	X	3

Sheet E	1	2	3	4	5	6	7	8	9	10	Final
Saskatchewan (Frisk)	0	2	1	0	0	1	0	1	0	2	7
Yukon/Northwest Territories (Hagen)	1	0	0	1	1	0	2	0	1	0	6

Sheet F	1	2	3	4	5	6	7	8	9	10	Final
British Columbia (Skakun)	3	0	0	0	1	2	0	0	3	X	9
Nova Scotia (Boutilier)	0	1	0	0	0	0	1	1	0	X	3

==== Draw 9 ====
Sheet A	1	2	3	4	5	6	7	8	9	10	Final
Nova Scotia (Boutilier)	1	0	0	0	0	0	0	X	X	X	1
Saskatchewan (Frisk)	0	3	3	1	1	1	1	X	X	X	10

Sheet B	1	2	3	4	5	6	7	8	9	10	Final
Yukon/Northwest Territories (Hagen)	0	1	2	0	0	0	1	0	2	X	6
Alberta (Turner)	1	0	0	3	1	1	0	2	0	X	8

Sheet C	1	2	3	4	5	6	7	8	9	10	Final
Prince Edward Island (Goulden)	0	0	1	0	0	1	0	1	X	X	3
British Columbia (Skakun)	2	1	0	3	1	0	3	0	X	X	10

Sheet D	1	2	3	4	5	6	7	8	9	10	Final
Quebec (Charette)	2	2	1	1	1	1	2	X	X	X	10
Northern Ontario (Dayes)	0	0	0	0	0	0	0	X	X	X	0

Sheet E	1	2	3	4	5	6	7	8	9	10	Final
Ontario (Greenwood)	1	0	1	0	1	6	2	0	1	X	12
New Brunswick (McDermott)	0	4	0	3	0	0	0	2	0	X	9

Sheet F	1	2	3	4	5	6	7	8	9	10	Final
Manitoba (Jones)	1	0	0	2	0	1	0	0	0	X	4
Newfoundland (Bartlett)	0	0	3	0	2	0	0	1	5	X	11

==== Draw 12 ====
Sheet A	1	2	3	4	5	6	7	8	9	10	Final
Newfoundland (Bartlett)	0	2	0	0	0	1	0	2	0	X	5
Ontario (Greenwood)	0	0	1	2	1	0	3	0	2	X	9

Sheet B	1	2	3	4	5	6	7	8	9	10	Final
New Brunswick (McDermott)	3	0	1	0	2	3	0	1	0	X	10
Quebec (Charette)	0	0	0	4	0	0	2	0	1	X	7

Sheet C	1	2	3	4	5	6	7	8	9	10	Final
Manitoba (Jones)	1	0	1	3	1	0	0	0	3	X	9
Prince Edward Island (Goulden)	0	0	0	0	0	1	1	0	0	X	2

Sheet D	1	2	3	4	5	6	7	8	9	10	Final
Northern Ontario (Dayes)	1	2	0	3	1	1	X	X	X	X	8
Yukon/Northwest Territories (Hagen)	0	0	1	0	0	0	X	X	X	X	1

Sheet E	1	2	3	4	5	6	7	8	9	10	Final
Alberta (Turner)	2	0	1	0	2	3	0	0	1	X	9
Nova Scotia (Boutilier)	0	1	0	2	0	0	1	1	0	X	5

Sheet F	1	2	3	4	5	6	7	8	9	10	Final
Saskatchewan (Frisk)	1	1	0	0	0	1	0	1	0	2	6
British Columbia (Skakun)	0	0	1	1	1	0	1	0	1	0	5

==== Draw 14 ====
Sheet A	1	2	3	4	5	6	7	8	9	10	11	Final
British Columbia (Skakun)	0	3	0	0	1	1	0	0	0	2	1	8
Alberta (Turner)	1	0	1	1	0	0	2	1	1	0	0	7

Sheet B	1	2	3	4	5	6	7	8	9	10	Final
Nova Scotia (Boutilier)	0	5	0	2	0	2	0	2	1	X	12
Northern Ontario (Dayes)	3	0	1	0	1	0	3	0	0	X	8

Sheet C	1	2	3	4	5	6	7	8	9	10	Final
Yukon/Northwest Territories (Hagen)	2	0	0	3	0	0	0	1	X	X	6
New Brunswick (McDermott)	0	1	3	0	3	5	0	0	X	X	12

Sheet D	1	2	3	4	5	6	7	8	9	10	Final
Prince Edward Island (Goulden)	0	1	1	0	1	0	0	X	X	X	3
Saskatchewan (Frisk)	3	0	0	2	0	4	2	X	X	X	11

Sheet E	1	2	3	4	5	6	7	8	9	10	Final
Quebec (Charette)	2	0	2	0	2	0	0	0	1	0	7
Newfoundland (Bartlett)	0	1	0	4	0	1	1	1	0	1	9

Sheet F	1	2	3	4	5	6	7	8	9	10	Final
Ontario (Greenwood)	0	1	0	1	1	0	0	3	0	X	6
Manitoba (Jones)	1	0	1	0	0	1	1	0	1	X	5

==== Draw 15 ====
Sheet A	1	2	3	4	5	6	7	8	9	10	Final
Manitoba (Jones)	1	2	0	1	0	0	2	0	2	0	8
Quebec (Charette)	0	0	2	0	2	2	0	4	0	1	11

Sheet B	1	2	3	4	5	6	7	8	9	10	Final
Ontario (Greenwood)	0	2	0	0	2	1	0	1	0	X	6
Prince Edward Island (Goulden)	0	0	0	1	0	0	1	0	1	X	3

Sheet C	1	2	3	4	5	6	7	8	9	10	Final
Newfoundland (Bartlett)	0	1	1	0	0	3	0	1	1	X	7
Yukon/Northwest Territories (Hagen)	1	0	0	0	1	0	1	0	0	X	3

Sheet D	1	2	3	4	5	6	7	8	9	10	11	Final
New Brunswick (McDermott)	0	1	0	2	0	0	2	0	2	0	1	8
Nova Scotia (Boutilier)	0	0	1	0	2	0	0	3	0	1	0	7

Sheet E	1	2	3	4	5	6	7	8	9	10	Final
Northern Ontario (Dayes)	0	0	1	0	0	0	1	1	0	X	3
British Columbia (Skakun)	1	1	0	0	4	2	0	0	1	X	9

Sheet F	1	2	3	4	5	6	7	8	9	10	Final
Alberta (Turner)	2	2	3	0	0	4	X	X	X	X	11
Saskatchewan (Frisk)	0	0	0	1	1	0	X	X	X	X	2

==== Draw 17 ====
Sheet A	1	2	3	4	5	6	7	8	9	10	Final
Saskatchewan (Frisk)	4	0	0	0	0	3	0	2	0	1	10
Northern Ontario (Dayes)	0	2	0	1	1	0	3	0	1	0	8

Sheet B	1	2	3	4	5	6	7	8	9	10	Final
British Columbia (Skakun)	0	0	0	3	0	2	1	1	0	X	7
New Brunswick (McDermott)	1	1	0	0	1	0	0	0	2	X	5

Sheet C	1	2	3	4	5	6	7	8	9	10	Final
Nova Scotia (Boutilier)	0	1	0	0	0	0	0	0	X	X	1
Newfoundland (Bartlett)	1	0	0	2	1	1	1	2	X	X	8

Sheet D	1	2	3	4	5	6	7	8	9	10	Final
Yukon/Northwest Territories (Hagen)	0	2	0	1	0	0	1	0	1	X	5
Manitoba (Jones)	1	0	1	0	0	2	0	2	0	X	6

Sheet E	1	2	3	4	5	6	7	8	9	10	Final
Prince Edward Island (Goulden)	2	0	0	0	0	0	0	0	X	X	2
Alberta (Turner)	0	2	1	1	1	0	2	2	X	X	9

Sheet F	1	2	3	4	5	6	7	8	9	10	Final
Quebec (Charette)	1	0	0	3	0	0	1	1	1	X	7
Ontario (Greenwood)	0	1	2	0	0	1	0	0	0	X	4

==== Draw 19 ====
Sheet A	1	2	3	4	5	6	7	8	9	10	Final
Quebec (Charette)	2	0	1	0	3	2	3	X	X	X	11
Prince Edward Island (Goulden)	0	0	0	1	0	0	0	X	X	X	1

Sheet B	1	2	3	4	5	6	7	8	9	10	Final
Ontario (Greenwood)	1	0	3	0	4	0	3	X	X	X	11
Yukon/Northwest Territories (Hagen)	0	1	0	1	0	2	0	X	X	X	4

Sheet C	1	2	3	4	5	6	7	8	9	10	Final
Northern Ontario (Dayes)	1	0	2	0	1	0	0	1	1	X	6
Alberta (Turner)	0	2	0	3	0	1	2	0	0	X	8

Sheet D	1	2	3	4	5	6	7	8	9	10	Final
Newfoundland (Bartlett)	0	1	0	0	0	1	0	1	0	0	3
British Columbia (Skakun)	0	0	1	1	0	0	2	0	1	3	8

Sheet E	1	2	3	4	5	6	7	8	9	10	Final
Manitoba (Jones)	0	0	1	1	0	2	1	0	3	0	8
Nova Scotia (Boutilier)	2	3	0	0	1	0	0	1	0	2	9

Sheet F	1	2	3	4	5	6	7	8	9	10	Final
New Brunswick (McDermott)	1	0	2	0	2	0	1	0	0	X	6
Saskatchewan (Frisk)	0	2	0	2	0	2	0	1	2	X	9

==== Draw 21 ====
Sheet A	1	2	3	4	5	6	7	8	9	10	Final
Alberta (Turner)	1	0	1	0	0	1	2	0	0	2	7
New Brunswick (McDermott)	0	0	0	1	1	0	0	2	2	0	6

Sheet B	1	2	3	4	5	6	7	8	9	10	11	Final
Saskatchewan (Frisk)	1	1	0	2	0	1	0	1	0	1	0	7
Newfoundland (Bartlett)	0	0	1	0	1	0	4	0	1	0	1	8

Sheet C	1	2	3	4	5	6	7	8	9	10	Final
British Columbia (Skakun)	0	0	2	0	1	0	0	1	1	0	5
Manitoba (Jones)	0	1	0	2	0	0	1	0	0	3	7

Sheet D	1	2	3	4	5	6	7	8	9	10	Final
Nova Scotia (Boutilier)	0	2	0	1	1	0	0	1	0	X	5
Ontario (Greenwood)	3	0	2	0	0	0	2	0	0	X	7

Sheet E	1	2	3	4	5	6	7	8	9	10	Final
Yukon/Northwest Territories (Hagen)	1	1	0	0	0	0	1	0	2	X	5
Quebec (Charette)	0	0	1	1	1	2	0	2	0	X	7

Sheet F	1	2	3	4	5	6	7	8	9	10	Final
Prince Edward Island (Goulden)	2	0	0	0	2	0	4	0	1	0	9
Northern Ontario (Dayes)	0	2	2	2	0	1	0	1	0	2	10

=== Playoffs ===
Semifinal		Final
Ontario	9
Saskatchewan	4	Quebec	9
		Ontario	5

==== Semifinal ====
Sheet C	1	2	3	4	5	6	7	8	9	10	Final
Ontario (Greenwood)	0	0	1	1	1	0	3	0	3	X	9
Saskatchewan (Frisk)	1	0	0	0	0	2	0	1	0	X	4

Player percentages
Ontario		Saskatchewan	
Vicki Lauder	75%	Maxine Rystephanick	67%
Gloria Campbell	69%	Myrna Graham	67%
Yvonne Smith	78%	Maureen Carter	69%
Jill Greenwood	86%	Crystal Frisk	54%
Total	77%	Total	64%

==== Final ====
Sheet C	1	2	3	4	5	6	7	8	9	10	Final
Quebec (Charette)	1	2	0	0	3	0	3	0	0	X	9
Ontario (Greenwood)	0	0	1	0	0	1	0	1	2	X	5

Player percentages
Quebec		Ontario	
Mary Anne Robertson	83%	Vicki Lauder	83%
Lois Baines	90%	Gloria Campbell	84%
Martha Don	95%	Yvonne Smith	79%
Agnes Charette	93%	Jill Greenwood	86%
Total	90%	Total	83%
