= Canadian Senior Curling Championships =

Annual curling championship in Canada

- Established: 1965 (men); 1973 (women)
- 2025 host city: Ottawa, Ontario
- 2025 arena: Ottawa Hunt and Golf Club

Current champions (2024)
- Men: Saskatchewan
- Women: Ontario

Current edition
- 2025 Canadian Senior Curling Championships

The Canadian Senior Curling Championships are an annual bonspiel held to determine the national champions in senior curling for Canada. Seniors are defined as being people over the age of 50. The championship teams play at the World Senior Curling Championships the following year.

The event's first committee was established in October 1964. Frank Sargent was an original member of the senior championship committee, and believed the event would attract former Brier competitors and give seniors a place to compete which had not existed. The inaugural Canadian Seniors Curling Championship was hosted in Port Arthur in March 1965. It used a minimum age of 55 for competitors, and had the Seagram Company as its title sponsor.

== Past champions ==
=== Men ===
==== 1964–1987 ====
Year	Team	Winning skip	Host
1965	Manitoba	Leo Johnson	Port Arthur, Ontario
1966	Ontario	Jim Johnston	Winnipeg, Manitoba
1967	New Brunswick	Jim Murphy	Montreal, Quebec
1968	Saskatchewan	Don Wilson	Edmonton, Alberta
1969	Ontario	Alfie Phillips	Hamilton, Ontario
1970	British Columbia	Don MacRae	Kamloops, British Columbia
1971	Prince Edward Island	Wen MacDonald	Halifax, Nova Scotia
1972	Quebec	Ken Weldon	Prince Albert, Saskatchewan
1973	Manitoba	Bill McTavish	Sudbury, Ontario
1974	British Columbia	George Beaudry	Saint John, New Brunswick
1975	Prince Edward Island	Wen MacDonald	Calgary, Alberta
1976	Prince Edward Island	Wen MacDonald	Ottawa, Ontario
1977	Saskatchewan	Morrie Thompson	Winnipeg, Manitoba
1978	Saskatchewan	Art Knutson	St. Thomas, Ontario
1979	Alberta	Cliff Forry	Noranda, Quebec
1980	Saskatchewan	Terry McGeary	Saint John, New Brunswick
1981	Quebec	Jim Wilson	Nanaimo, British Columbia
1982	Manitoba	Lloyd Gunnlaugson	Charlottetown, Prince Edward Island
1983	Manitoba	Lloyd Gunnlaugson	Sarnia, Ontario
1984	Manitoba	Lloyd Gunnlaugson	St. John's, Newfoundland
1985	Saskatchewan	Frank Scheirich	Yorkton, Saskatchewan
1986	Ontario	Earle Hushagen	Portage la Prairie, Manitoba
1987	Manitoba	Norm Houck	Prince George, British Columbia

==== 1988–present ====
A playoff was added in 1988

Year	Team	Winning skip	Runner-up team (skip)	Host
1988	Alberta	Bill Clark	Manitoba (Barry Coleman)	Peterborough, Ontario
1989	Ontario	Jim Sharples	Saskatchewan (Harvey Mazinke)	Kenora, Ontario
1990	Manitoba	Jim Ursel	British Columbia (Jerry Martin)	Whitehorse, Yukon
1991	Manitoba	Jim Ursel	Northwest Territories/Yukon (Al Delmage)	Victoria, British Columbia
1992	Ontario	Jim Sharples	Manitoba (Barry Fry)	Nipawin, Saskatchewan
1993	Alberta	Len Erickson	Northwest Territories/Yukon (Al Delmage)	Edmonton, Alberta
1994	New Brunswick	David Sullivan	British Columbia (Jim Horswell)	Moose Jaw, Saskatchewan
1995	Ontario	Bill Dickie	Saskatchewan (Glenn Pryor)	Saint John, New Brunswick
1996	Ontario	Bob Turcotte	Northern Ontario (Bill Johnston)	Medicine Hat, Alberta
1997	Ontario	Bob Turcotte	Saskatchewan (Murray Eddy)	Thornhill, Ontario
1998	Saskatchewan	Gary Bryden	Manitoba (Clare DeBlonde)	Sault Ste. Marie, Ontario
1999	British Columbia	Ken Watson	Ontario (Jim Sharples)	Saskatoon, Saskatchewan
2000	Ontario	Bob Turcotte	British Columbia (Wayne Laface)	Portage la Prairie, Manitoba
2001	Manitoba	Gary Ross	Alberta (Tom Reed)	Calgary, Alberta
2002	Manitoba	Carl German	Ontario (Bob Fedosa)	St. Thomas, Ontario
2003	Alberta	Tom Reed	Manitoba (Doug Armour)	Lethbridge, Alberta
2004	Newfoundland and Labrador	Bas Buckle	Nova Scotia (Steve Ogden)	Vernon, British Columbia
2005	Alberta	Les Rogers	Northern Ontario (Al Harnden)	East St. Paul, Manitoba
2006	Northern Ontario	Al Hackner	Alberta (Les Rogers)	Summerside, Prince Edward Island
2007	Alberta	Pat Ryan	Ontario (Bob Turcotte)	Trois-Rivières, Quebec
2008	Saskatchewan	Eugene Hritzuk	New Brunswick (Russ Howard)	Prince Albert, Saskatchewan
2009	Ontario	Bruce Delaney	New Brunswick (Russ Howard)	Summerside, Prince Edward Island
2010	Alberta	Mark Johnson	Ontario (Gareth Parry)	Ottawa, Ontario
2011	Manitoba	Kelly Robertson	Alberta (Brad Hannah)	Digby, Nova Scotia
2012	Alberta	Rob Armitage	Newfoundland and Labrador (Glenn Goss)	Abbotsford, British Columbia
2013	New Brunswick	Wayne Tallon	Ontario (Howard Rajala)	Summerside, Prince Edward Island
2014	Nova Scotia	Alan O'Leary	Manitoba (Kelly Robertson)	Yellowknife, Northwest Territories
2015	Manitoba	Randy Neufeld	Quebec (Ted Butler)	Edmonton, Alberta
2016	Ontario	Bryan Cochrane	Manitoba (Randy Neufeld)	Digby, Nova Scotia
2017	Alberta	Wade White	Ontario (Howard Rajala)	Fredericton, New Brunswick
2018	Ontario	Bryan Cochrane	New Brunswick (Terry Odishaw)	Stratford, Ontario
2019	Saskatchewan	Bruce Korte	Ontario (Bryan Cochrane)	Chilliwack, British Columbia
2020	Cancelled due to the COVID-19 pandemic in Canada			Portage la Prairie, Manitoba
2021	Alberta	Wade White	Ontario (Bryan Cochrane)	Sault Ste. Marie, Ontario
2022	Ontario	Howard Rajala	Alberta (James Pahl)	Yarmouth, Nova Scotia
2023	Nova Scotia	Paul Flemming	Saskatchewan (Bruce Korte)	Vernon, British Columbia
2024	Saskatchewan	Randy Bryden	Alberta (James Pahl)	Moncton, New Brunswick
2025	Saskatchewan	Bruce Korte	Ontario (Mike Harris)	Ottawa, Ontario

Province	Titles by province
Ontario	13
Manitoba	12
Alberta	10
Saskatchewan	10
British Columbia	3
New Brunswick	3
Prince Edward Island	3
Nova Scotia	2
Quebec	2
Newfoundland and Labrador	1
Northern Ontario	1

=== Women ===
==== 1973–1987 ====
Year	Team	Winning skip	Host
1973	British Columbia	Ada Calles	Ottawa, Ontario
1974	British Columbia	Flora Martin	Halifax, Nova Scotia
1975	British Columbia	Flora Martin	Swift Current, Saskatchewan
1976	Alberta	Hadie Manley	Charlottetown, Prince Edward Island
1977	British Columbia	Vi Tapella	Peace River, Alberta
1978	Alberta	Hadie Manley	St. John's, Newfoundland
1979	British Columbia	Flora Martin	Vernon, British Columbia
1980	British Columbia	Flora Martin	Fredericton, New Brunswick
1981	Alberta	Bea Mayer	Winnipeg, Manitoba
1982	Nova Scotia	Verda Kempton	Montreal, Quebec
1983	Manitoba	Mabel Mitchell	Guelph, Ontario
1984	Saskatchewan	Ev Krahn	Halifax, Nova Scotia
1985	Saskatchewan	Ev Krahn	Yorkton, Saskatchewan
1986	Saskatchewan	Ev Krahn	Portage la Prairie, Manitoba
1987	Nova Scotia	Verda Kempton	Prince George, British Columbia

==== 1988–present ====
A playoff was added in 1988

Year	Team	Winning skip	Runner-up team (skip)	Host
1988	Ontario	Phyllis Nielsen	British Columbia (Helen Elson)	Peterborough, Ontario
1989	Saskatchewan	Emily Farnham	Alberta (Arthena Fleming)	Kenora, Ontario
1990	Ontario	Jill Greenwood	Alberta (Amy Nakamura)	Whitehorse, Yukon
1991	Northern Ontario	Eila Brown	Saskatchewan (Emily Farnham)	Victoria, British Columbia
1992	Saskatchewan	Sheila Rowan	British Columbia (Bessie Low)	Nipawin, Saskatchewan
1993	Ontario	Jill Greenwood	Manitoba (Joan Ingram)	Edmonton, Alberta
1994	Alberta	Cordella Schwengler	Newfoundland (Sue Anne Bartlett)	Moose Jaw, Saskatchewan
1995	Northern Ontario	Sheila Ross	Quebec (Michele Page)	Saint John, New Brunswick
1996	Ontario	Jill Greenwood	British Columbia (Jeanette Sillars)	Medicine Hat, Alberta
1997	Quebec	Agnès Charette	Ontario (Jill Greenwood)	Thornhill, Ontario
1998	Ontario	Jill Greenwood	Quebec (Agnès Charette)	Sault Ste. Marie, Ontario
1999	Quebec	Agnès Charette	British Columbia (Maymar Gemmell)	Saskatoon, Saskatchewan
2000	Quebec	Agnès Charette	Saskatchewan (Nancy Kerr)	Portage la Prairie, Manitoba
2001	Ontario	Anne Dunn	Manitoba (Linda Van Daele)	Calgary, Alberta
2002	Ontario	Anne Dunn	Alberta (Simone Handfield)	St. Thomas, Ontario
2003	Saskatchewan	Nancy Kerr	British Columbia (Karen Lepine)	Lethbridge, Alberta
2004	Ontario	Anne Dunn	British Columbia (Kathy Smiley)	Vernon, British Columbia
2005	Ontario	Joyce Potter	British Columbia (Kathy Smiley)	East St. Paul, Manitoba
2006	Ontario	Anne Dunn	British Columbia (Jane Adam)	Summerside, Prince Edward Island
2007	Alberta	Diane Foster	British Columbia (Kathy Smiley)	Trois-Rivières, Quebec
2008	British Columbia	Pat Sanders	Ontario (Ann Pearson)	Prince Albert, Saskatchewan
2009	Nova Scotia	Colleen Pinkney	British Columbia (Kathy Smiley)	Summerside, Prince Edward Island
2010	British Columbia	Christine Jurgenson	New Brunswick (Heidi Hanlon)	Ottawa, Ontario
2011	New Brunswick	Heidi Hanlon	Ontario (Joyce Potter)	Digby, Nova Scotia
2012	Alberta	Cathy King	Newfoundland and Labrador (Cathy Cunningham)	Abbotsford, British Columbia
2013	Nova Scotia	Colleen Pinkney	Alberta (Deb Santos)	Summerside, Prince Edward Island
2014	Manitoba	Lois Fowler	Saskatchewan (Lorraine Arguin)	Yellowknife, Northwest Territories
2015	Alberta	Terri Loblaw	Nova Scotia (Colleen Jones)	Edmonton, Alberta
2016	Nova Scotia	Colleen Jones	Saskatchewan (Sherry Anderson)	Digby, Nova Scotia
2017	Saskatchewan	Sherry Anderson	Ontario (Jo-Ann Rizzo)	Fredericton, New Brunswick
2018	Saskatchewan	Sherry Anderson	Nova Scotia (Mary Mattatall)	Stratford, Ontario
2019	Saskatchewan	Sherry Anderson	Ontario (Sherry Middaugh)	Chilliwack, British Columbia
2020	Cancelled due to the COVID-19 pandemic in Canada			Portage la Prairie, Manitoba
2021	Saskatchewan	Sherry Anderson	British Columbia (Mary-Anne Arsenault)	Sault Ste. Marie, Ontario
2022	Saskatchewan	Sherry Anderson	Quebec (Chantal Osborne)	Yarmouth, Nova Scotia
2023	Ontario	Susan Froud	Saskatchewan (Nancy Martin)	Vernon, British Columbia
2024	Alberta	Atina Ford-Johnston	Ontario (Jo-Ann Rizzo)	Moncton, New Brunswick
2025	Ontario	Sherry Middaugh	Saskatchewan (Amber Holland)	Ottawa, Ontario

Province	Titles by province
Ontario	12
Saskatchewan	11
British Columbia	8
Alberta	8
Nova Scotia	5
Quebec	3
Manitoba	2
Northern Ontario	2
New Brunswick	1
