= 1992 Canadian Senior Curling Championships =

The 1992 Canadian Senior Curling Championships, Canada's national championship for curlers over 50, were held March 14 to 21, 1992 at the Evergreen Centre in Nipawin, Saskatchewan.

Team Ontario, consisting of Brian Longley, Joe Gurowka, Art Lobel and Jim Sharples of Toronto won the men's event, defeating the heavily favoured Barry Fry Manitoba team in the final, 4–3. Ontario skip Sharples scored a deuce in the fourth end, and was on the defence thereafter, playing a wide-open game. The game went to an extra game, where Ontario clinched the championship before Sharples even had to throw his last rock. The turning point in the extra end was when one of Manitoba's third Don Duguid's stones picked on a stray hair. This was the second seniors title for Sharples.

Team Saskatchewan, consisting of Joyce McKee, Doreen Thomas, Donna Trapp and Sheila Rowan of Saskatoon won the women's event, defeating British Columbia's Bessie Low rink in a "see-saw" final, 6–5. After four blank ends, Low scored a deuce in the fifth end following a tap back. In the sixth, Saskatchewan skip Rowan drew to the back eight foot to score three to take the lead. After trading scores of two in the next two ends. In the tenth end, Low flashed a takeout attempt on her first shot, and had to settle for a single, putting the game into an extra end. In the extra, Saskatchewan's third Trapp made a raise triple takeout to clear the house of BC stones, which would eventually lead to a hit-and-stick for Rowan to claim the championship. The Rowan rink was originally skipped by Vera Pezer, but Pezer was away during provincial playdowns, working with the Canadian Olympic team at the 1992 Winter Olympics as a sports psychologist. Following Pezer's departure, the team added McKee to the rink as lead.

== Men's ==
=== Standings ===
Final round-robin standings.

Key
| Teams to playoff |

| Locale | Skip | W | L |
|---|---|---|---|
| Manitoba | Barry Fry | 9 | 2 |
| Ontario | Jim Sharples | 8 | 3 |
| Nova Scotia | Peter Corkum | 8 | 3 |
| Saskatchewan | Don Gunn | 7 | 4 |
| Alberta | Gil Schmaltz | 6 | 5 |
| Northwest Territories/Yukon | Richard Bird | 6 | 5 |
| British Columbia | Larry Anderson | 5 | 6 |
| Northern Ontario | Tom Melnyk | 5 | 6 |
| Newfoundland | Damien Ryan | 4 | 7 |
| New Brunswick | David Buckle | 3 | 8 |
| Quebec | Dick Gelinas | 3 | 8 |
| Prince Edward Island | Wayne Gardiner | 2 | 9 |

=== Playoffs ===
| Semifinal | | Final |
| Ontario | 6 |
| Nova Scotia | 3 | Manitoba | 3 |
| | | Ontario | 4 |

==== Semifinal ====
| Team | 1 | 2 | 3 | 4 | 5 | 6 | 7 | 8 | 9 | 10 | Final |
|---|---|---|---|---|---|---|---|---|---|---|---|
| Ontario (Sharples) | 0 | 2 | 0 | 0 | 0 | 0 | 0 | 1 | 0 | 3 | 6 |
| Nova Scotia (Corkum) | 0 | 0 | 0 | 0 | 1 | 0 | 1 | 0 | 1 | 0 | 3 |

==== Final ====
| Team | 1 | 2 | 3 | 4 | 5 | 6 | 7 | 8 | 9 | 10 | 11 | Final |
|---|---|---|---|---|---|---|---|---|---|---|---|---|
| Ontario (Sharples) | 0 | 0 | 0 | 2 | 0 | 0 | 0 | 1 | 0 | 0 | 1 | 4 |
| Manitoba (Fry) | 1 | 0 | 0 | 0 | 1 | 0 | 0 | 0 | 0 | 1 | 0 | 3 |

== Women's ==
=== Standings ===
Final round-robin standings.

Key
| Teams to playoff |

| Locale | Skip | W | L |
|---|---|---|---|
| British Columbia | Bessie Low | 8 | 3 |
| Saskatchewan | Sheila Rowan | 8 | 3 |
| Alberta | Phyllis Raymond | 8 | 3 |
| New Brunswick | Grace Donald | 7 | 4 |
| Manitoba | Joan Ingram | 7 | 4 |
| Quebec | Martha Don | 6 | 5 |
| Northern Ontario | Sheila Ross | 6 | 5 |
| Ontario | Lorraine Coughlan | 5 | 6 |
| Prince Edward Island | Elayne Thompson | 5 | 6 |
| Nova Scotia | Rosemary Beck | 3 | 8 |
| Newfoundland | Janet Quinn | 3 | 8 |
| Yukon/Northwest Territories | Cookie Morgan | 0 | 11 |

=== Playoffs ===
| Semifinal | | Final |
| Saskatchewan | 8 |
| Alberta | 1 | British Columbia | 5 |
| | | Saskatchewan | 6 |

==== Semifinal ====
March 19, 8:00pm

| Team | 1 | 2 | 3 | 4 | 5 | 6 | 7 | 8 | 9 | 10 | Final |
|---|---|---|---|---|---|---|---|---|---|---|---|
| Saskatchewan (Rowan) | 1 | 0 | 0 | 2 | 2 | 0 | 2 | 1 | X | X | 8 |
| Alberta (Raymond) | 0 | 0 | 1 | 0 | 0 | 0 | 0 | 0 | X | X | 1 |

==== Final ====
| Team | 1 | 2 | 3 | 4 | 5 | 6 | 7 | 8 | 9 | 10 | 11 | Final |
|---|---|---|---|---|---|---|---|---|---|---|---|---|
| Saskatchewan (Rowan) | 0 | 0 | 0 | 0 | 0 | 3 | 0 | 2 | 0 | 0 | 1 | 6 |
| British Columbia (Low) | 0 | 0 | 0 | 0 | 2 | 0 | 2 | 0 | 0 | 1 | 0 | 5 |
