= 1993 Canadian Senior Curling Championships =

The 1993 Canadian Senior Curling Championships, Canada's national championship for curlers over 50, were held March 13 to 20, 1993 at the Ottewell Curling Club in Edmonton, Alberta.

Team Alberta, consisting of Len Erickson, Merl Brown, Bernie Desjarlais and Nelson Caron from the host Ottewell Club won the men's event, defeating the Northwest Territories/Yukon rink, skipped by Al Demage 8–4 in the final. It was the first Canadian Senior Championship for an Edmonton rink, and the third men's championship for Alberta.

Team Ontario, consisting of Jill Greenwood, Yvonne Smith, Victoria Lauder and Maymar Gemmell from Mississauga won the women's event, 6–4 over Manitoba's Joan Ingram rink. Greenwood made a six-foot double-raise takeout "circus shot" on her final stone of the game to win her second national seniors title.

== Men's ==
=== Standings ===
Final round-robin standings.

Key
Teams to playoff

Locale	Skip	W	L
Alberta	Len Erickson	9	2
Manitoba	Frank Gudz	8	3
Northwest Territories/Yukon	Al Delmage	8	3
Prince Edward Island	Bob Dillon	6	5
Saskatchewan	Garnet Campbell	6	5
British Columbia	Kevin Smale	5	6
Newfoundland	Dennis Byrne	5	6
Ontario	Ken Buchan	5	6
Northern Ontario	Brian Carr	4	7
Nova Scotia	Peter Corkum	4	7
Quebec	Bill Rothwell	3	8
New Brunswick	David Buckle	2	9

=== Playoffs ===
Semifinal		Final
Manitoba	6
Northwest Territories/Yukon	7	Alberta	8
		Northwest Territories/Yukon	4

==== Semifinal ====
March 19, 8:00pm

Team	1	2	3	4	5	6	7	8	9	10	11	Final
Manitoba (Gudz)	0	2	0	1	0	2	0	0	1	0	0	6
Northwest Territories/Yukon (Delmage)	1	0	1	0	1	0	1	1	0	1	1	7

==== Final ====
March 20, 2:00pm

Team	1	2	3	4	5	6	7	8	9	10	Final
Alberta (Erickson)	4	0	2	1	0	0	0	1	0	X	8
Northwest Territories/Yukon (Delmage)	0	1	0	0	0	1	1	0	1	X	4

== Women's ==
=== Standings ===
Final round-robin standings.

Key
Teams to playoff

Locale	Skip	W	L
Manitoba	Joan Ingram	9	2
Alberta	Cordella Schwengler	8	3
Ontario	Jill Greenwood	8	3
Northern Ontario	Sheila Ross	7	4
New Brunswick	Ellen Brennan	7	4
British Columbia	Sharon Kempthorne	6	5
Prince Edward Island	Janet McDonald	6	5
Saskatchewan	Marian Mazinke	5	6
Nova Scotia	Jean Skinner	4	7
Quebec	Joan MacKay	4	7
Newfoundland	Jean Rockwell	2	9
Yukon/Northwest Territories	Madeline Boyd	1	10

=== Playoffs ===
Semifinal		Final
Alberta	5
Ontario	9	Manitoba	4
		Ontario	6

==== Semifinal ====
March 19, 8:00pm

Team	1	2	3	4	5	6	7	8	9	10	Final
Alberta (Schwengler)	2	0	0	0	0	2	1	0	0	0	5
Ontario (Greenwood)	0	0	2	0	2	0	0	2	0	3	9

==== Final ====
March 20, 2:00pm

Team	1	2	3	4	5	6	7	8	9	10	11	Final
Manitoba (Ingram)	2	0	0	0	0	0	0	1	0	1	0	4
Ontario (Greenwood)	0	2	1	0	1	0	0	1	0	0	1	6
