= 1973 Macdonald Lassies Championship =

Canadian women's curling championship

- Host city: Charlottetown, Prince Edward Island
- Arena: Charlottetown Curling Club
- Dates: February 26–March 2
- Winner: Saskatchewan
- Curling club: Sutherland Ladies CC, Saskatoon
- Skip: Vera Pezer
- Third: Sheila Rowan
- Second: Joyce McKee
- Lead: Lee Morrison
- Finalist: Manitoba (Joan Ingram)

The 1973 Macdonald Lassies Championship, the Canadian women's curling championship was held February 26 to March 2 at the Charlottetown Curling Club in Charlottetown, Prince Edward Island.

Manitoba and Saskatchewan both finished round robin play tied for first with 8–1 records, necessitating a tiebreaker playoff between the two teams. Team Saskatchewan, who was skipped by Vera Pezer defeated Manitoba in the tiebreaker 6–4 to capture the championship. Saskatchewan defeated Manitoba in the final draw 7–5 in an extra end to force the tiebreaker.

It was the sixth overall title for Saskatchewan and their fifth in a row. This was also the third straight title for the Pezer rink, becoming the first rink to win three straight championships. After the win, the team decided to retire from competitive curling.

The Nova Scotia rink finished winless for the second time in three years and became the fourth rink to accomplish the dubious feat. Nova Scotia only scored 37 points, setting a then-record for fewest points scored in a single tournament. This broke the previous mark of 43 also set by Nova Scotia in 1971.

== Teams ==
The teams were as follows:

Alberta	British Columbia	Manitoba	New Brunswick	Newfoundland
Thistle Ladies CC, Edmonton Skip: Betty Cole; Third: Shirley Fisk; Second: Bonnie Cessford; Lead: Sharon Grey	Nanaimo Ladies CC, Nanaimo Skip: Karin Kaese; Third: Shannon Blackburn; Second: Loretto Ahlstrom; Lead: Donna Dunn	Fort Garry Business Girls CC, Winnipeg Skip: Joan Ingram; Third: Lorraine Bradawaski; Second: Dorothy Rose; Lead: Jackie Tinney	Capital WC, Fredericton Skip: Sheila McLeod; Third: Lois Walker; Second: Agnes Freeze; Lead: Isabelle Lougheed	St. John's CC, St. John's Skip: Ann Bowering; Third: Joan Pope; Second: Jean Burden; Lead: Chris Cathcart
Nova Scotia	Ontario	Prince Edward Island	Quebec	Saskatchewan
Dartmouth Ladies CC, Dartmouth Skip: Elizabeth Hodgins; Third: Faye Thornham; Second: Marjorie White; Lead: Shelaugh Thomson	Arnprior CC, Arnprior Skip: Isobel Munro; Third: Thelma Lindsay; Second: Geraldine Macklem; Lead: Vyvienne Johnston	Crapaud Community CC, Crapaud Skip: Elayne Thompson; Third: Ruth Cutcliffe; Second: Louise Thompson; Lead: Frances Roberts	Montreal Caledonia CC, Westmount Skip: Lee Tobin; Third: Francine Collison; Second: Marilyn Hone; Lead: Michelle Garneau	Sutherland Ladies CC, Saskatoon Skip: Vera Pezer; Third: Sheila Rowan; Second: Joyce McKee; Lead: Lee Morrison

== Map of teams ==
Provincial Winners

== Round Robin Standings ==
Final round robin standings

Key
Teams to Tiebreaker

Province	Skip	W	L	PF	PA
Saskatchewan	Vera Pezer	8	1	69	50
Manitoba	Joan Ingram	8	1	76	48
Alberta	Betty Cole	6	3	86	49
British Columbia	Karin Kaese	6	3	89	70
Ontario	Isobel Munro	6	3	90	67
Prince Edward Island	Elayne Thompson	5	4	69	73
Quebec	Lee Tobin	3	6	53	66
Newfoundland	Ann Bowering	2	7	51	84
New Brunswick	Sheila McLeod	1	8	63	86
Nova Scotia	Elizabeth Hodgins	0	9	37	90

== Round Robin results ==
All draw times are listed in Atlantic Standard Time (UTC-04:00).

=== Draw 1 ===
Monday, February 26, 2:30 pm

Team	1	2	3	4	5	6	7	8	9	10	Final
Quebec (Tobin)	1	0	0	0	0	3	0	0	1	X	5
British Columbia (Kaese)	0	1	0	1	0	0	2	4	0	X	8

Team	1	2	3	4	5	6	7	8	9	10	Final
Alberta (Cole)	0	3	2	0	0	3	1	1	1	X	11
Newfoundland (Bowering)	1	0	0	0	3	0	0	0	0	X	4

Team	1	2	3	4	5	6	7	8	9	10	Final
Prince Edward Island (Thompson)	0	1	0	0	2	3	0	5	1	X	12
New Brunswick (McLeod)	1	0	0	2	0	0	4	0	0	X	7

Team	1	2	3	4	5	6	7	8	9	10	Final
Nova Scotia (Hodgins)	0	0	0	0	1	0	0	1	0	X	2
Manitoba (Ingram)	0	1	1	2	0	1	2	0	3	X	10

Team	1	2	3	4	5	6	7	8	9	10	Final
Ontario (Munro)	0	3	2	0	0	2	0	0	1	X	8
Saskatchewan (Pezer)	3	0	0	3	3	0	3	2	0	X	14

=== Draw 2 ===
Monday, February 26, 8:00 pm

Team	1	2	3	4	5	6	7	8	9	10	Final
Prince Edward Island (Thompson)	2	0	2	0	0	2	1	2	1	X	10
Quebec (Tobin)	0	1	0	1	1	0	0	0	0	X	3

Team	1	2	3	4	5	6	7	8	9	10	Final
Manitoba (Ingram)	4	0	0	0	1	0	1	0	2	0	8
Newfoundland (Bowering)	0	1	1	1	0	1	0	1	0	1	6

Team	1	2	3	4	5	6	7	8	9	10	Final
British Columbia (Kaese)	0	3	0	0	2	2	2	0	0	2	11
New Brunswick (McLeod)	1	0	2	1	0	0	0	2	2	0	8

Team	1	2	3	4	5	6	7	8	9	10	Final
Ontario (Munro)	3	1	0	1	0	1	0	5	0	3	14
Nova Scotia (Hodgins)	0	0	1	0	0	0	3	0	1	0	5

Team	1	2	3	4	5	6	7	8	9	10	11	Final
Saskatchewan (Pezer)	1	1	2	0	0	0	0	0	1	0	1	6
Alberta (Cole)	0	0	0	1	0	1	1	1	0	1	0	5

=== Draw 3 ===
Tuesday, February 27, 2:30 pm

Team	1	2	3	4	5	6	7	8	9	10	Final
Alberta (Cole)	3	1	2	3	0	3	0	0	2	X	14
New Brunswick (McLeod)	0	0	0	0	2	0	1	1	0	X	4

Team	1	2	3	4	5	6	7	8	9	10	Final
Nova Scotia (Hodgins)	0	1	1	0	0	0	1	1	0	1	5
Prince Edward Island (Thompson)	1	0	0	1	1	2	0	0	2	0	7

Team	1	2	3	4	5	6	7	8	9	10	Final
Quebec (Tobin)	1	0	1	0	1	0	0	2	0	0	5
Saskatchewan (Pezer)	0	1	0	1	0	0	1	0	2	1	6

Team	1	2	3	4	5	6	7	8	9	10	Final
Ontario (Munro)	2	0	2	2	0	2	2	0	X	X	10
Newfoundland (Bowering)	0	2	0	0	1	0	0	1	X	X	4

Team	1	2	3	4	5	6	7	8	9	10	Final
British Columbia (Kaese)	0	1	0	4	0	1	0	0	2	0	8
Manitoba (Ingram)	3	0	3	0	0	0	1	0	0	4	11

=== Draw 4 ===
Tuesday, February 27, 8:00 pm

Team	1	2	3	4	5	6	7	8	9	10	Final
New Brunswick (McLeod)	3	2	3	2	1	3	X	X	X	X	14
Nova Scotia (Hodgins)	0	0	0	0	0	0	X	X	X	X	0

Team	1	2	3	4	5	6	7	8	9	10	Final
British Columbia (Kaese)	1	0	2	0	0	1	4	1	1	X	10
Prince Edward Island (Thompson)	0	1	0	2	3	0	0	0	0	X	6

Team	1	2	3	4	5	6	7	8	9	10	Final
Manitoba (Ingram)	0	0	0	0	2	2	1	2	0	X	7
Quebec (Tobin)	1	0	2	0	0	0	0	0	1	X	4

Team	1	2	3	4	5	6	7	8	9	10	Final
Saskatchewan (Pezer)	0	1	0	1	1	0	1	1	0	0	5
Newfoundland (Bowering)	1	0	1	0	0	0	0	0	1	1	4

Team	1	2	3	4	5	6	7	8	9	10	Final
Ontario (Munro)	0	0	1	1	0	1	0	2	1	2	8
Alberta (Cole)	2	1	0	0	1	0	2	0	0	0	6

=== Draw 5 ===
Wednesday, February 28, 9:30 am

Team	1	2	3	4	5	6	7	8	9	10	Final
British Columbia (Kaese)	0	3	1	0	1	2	0	0	0	3	10
Ontario (Munro)	1	0	0	3	0	0	1	1	1	0	7

Team	1	2	3	4	5	6	7	8	9	10	Final
Saskatchewan (Pezer)	1	0	0	0	1	1	1	2	0	X	6
Nova Scotia (Hodgins)	0	0	0	2	0	0	0	0	3	X	5

Team	1	2	3	4	5	6	7	8	9	10	Final
Manitoba (Ingram)	0	0	0	1	0	1	1	1	0	1	5
Alberta (Cole)	0	0	1	0	1	0	0	0	1	0	3

Team	1	2	3	4	5	6	7	8	9	10	Final
Prince Edward Island (Thompson)	0	1	2	2	1	0	0	1	1	1	9
Newfoundland (Bowering)	2	0	0	0	0	1	2	0	0	0	5

Team	1	2	3	4	5	6	7	8	9	10	11	Final
Quebec (Tobin)	0	2	0	1	1	1	0	0	1	0	1	7
New Brunswick (McLeod)	1	0	0	0	0	0	2	1	0	2	0	6

=== Draw 6 ===
Wednesday, February 28, 2:30 pm

Team	1	2	3	4	5	6	7	8	9	10	Final
British Columbia (Kaese)	0	0	5	1	0	0	4	3	X	X	13
Newfoundland (Bowering)	1	1	0	0	2	1	0	0	X	X	5

Team	1	2	3	4	5	6	7	8	9	10	Final
Prince Edward Island (Thompson)	0	2	0	1	0	0	1	3	1	0	8
Saskatchewan (Pezer)	1	0	2	0	2	1	0	0	0	1	7

Team	1	2	3	4	5	6	7	8	9	10	Final
Manitoba (Ingram)	0	2	0	0	2	5	0	3	0	X	12
New Brunswick (McLeod)	1	0	1	1	0	0	1	0	2	X	6

Team	1	2	3	4	5	6	7	8	9	10	Final
Ontario (Munro)	3	0	2	2	0	2	1	0	0	0	10
Quebec (Tobin)	0	2	0	0	1	0	0	1	2	1	7

Team	1	2	3	4	5	6	7	8	9	10	Final
Alberta (Cole)	2	1	1	2	1	0	1	1	1	X	10
Nova Scotia (Hodgins)	0	0	0	0	0	1	0	0	0	X	1

=== Draw 7 ===
Wednesday, February 28, 8:00 pm

Team	1	2	3	4	5	6	7	8	9	10	Final
British Columbia (Kaese)	4	0	1	0	3	0	2	3	0	X	13
Nova Scotia (Hodgins)	0	1	0	2	0	2	0	0	2	X	7

Team	1	2	3	4	5	6	7	8	9	10	Final
Manitoba (Ingram)	0	0	3	0	3	0	0	0	4	X	10
Ontario (Munro)	1	1	0	1	0	2	1	2	0	X	8

Team	1	2	3	4	5	6	7	8	9	10	Final
Saskatchewan (Pezer)	0	1	1	3	0	2	0	0	3	X	10
New Brunswick (McLeod)	1	0	0	0	1	0	2	0	0	X	4

Team	1	2	3	4	5	6	7	8	9	10	Final
Alberta (Cole)	0	4	1	0	0	3	0	4	1	1	14
Prince Edward Island (Thompson)	1	0	0	3	2	0	2	0	0	0	8

Team	1	2	3	4	5	6	7	8	9	10	Final
Quebec (Tobin)	0	4	2	5	0	2	X	X	X	X	13
Newfoundland (Bowering)	1	0	0	0	3	0	X	X	X	X	4

=== Draw 8 ===
Thursday, March 1, 2:30 pm

Team	1	2	3	4	5	6	7	8	9	10	Final
Ontario (Munro)	0	3	2	5	1	0	0	0	0	X	11
New Brunswick (McLeod)	1	0	0	0	0	1	2	1	1	X	6

Team	1	2	3	4	5	6	7	8	9	10	Final
Manitoba (Ingram)	2	0	1	0	2	0	1	0	2	X	8
Prince Edward Island (Thompson)	0	1	0	1	0	1	0	1	0	X	4

Team	1	2	3	4	5	6	7	8	9	10	Final
British Columbia (Kaese)	0	1	0	1	0	1	0	3	0	0	6
Saskatchewan (Pezer)	1	0	2	0	1	0	1	0	2	1	8

Team	1	2	3	4	5	6	7	8	9	10	Final
Alberta (Cole)	0	2	1	1	0	0	3	2	1	X	10
Quebec (Tobin)	1	0	0	0	1	1	0	0	0	X	3

Team	1	2	3	4	5	6	7	8	9	10	Final
Nova Scotia (Hodgins)	0	2	1	0	0	2	0	1	0	1	7
Newfoundland (Bowering)	1	0	0	1	2	0	5	0	1	0	10

=== Draw 9 ===
Thursday, March 1, 8:00 pm

Team	1	2	3	4	5	6	7	8	9	10	Final
Quebec (Tobin)	0	0	0	2	0	1	0	1	0	2	6
Nova Scotia (Hodgins)	0	2	1	0	0	0	1	0	1	0	5

Team	1	2	3	4	5	6	7	8	9	10	Final
Newfoundland (Bowering)	0	1	3	1	0	2	0	1	0	1	9
New Brunswick (McLeod)	1	0	0	0	3	0	2	0	2	0	8

Team	1	2	3	4	5	6	7	8	9	10	Final
Ontario (Munro)	2	1	1	3	3	0	0	0	4	X	14
Prince Edward Island (Thompson)	0	0	0	0	0	3	1	1	0	X	5

Team	1	2	3	4	5	6	7	8	9	10	Final
Alberta (Cole)	0	5	0	3	0	0	0	2	0	3	13
British Columbia (Kaese)	1	0	2	0	1	3	1	0	2	0	10

Team	1	2	3	4	5	6	7	8	9	10	11	Final
Manitoba (Ingram)	0	0	1	1	0	2	0	0	1	0	0	5
Saskatchewan (Pezer)	0	2	0	0	1	0	0	1	0	1	2	7

== Tiebreaker ==
Friday, March 2, 9:30 am

Team	1	2	3	4	5	6	7	8	9	10	Final
Saskatchewan (Pezer)	1	2	0	1	0	0	0	2	0	X	6
Manitoba (Ingram) 🔨	0	0	3	0	0	1	0	0	0	X	4
