= Sutherland Curling Club =

Curling club in Saskatoon, Canada

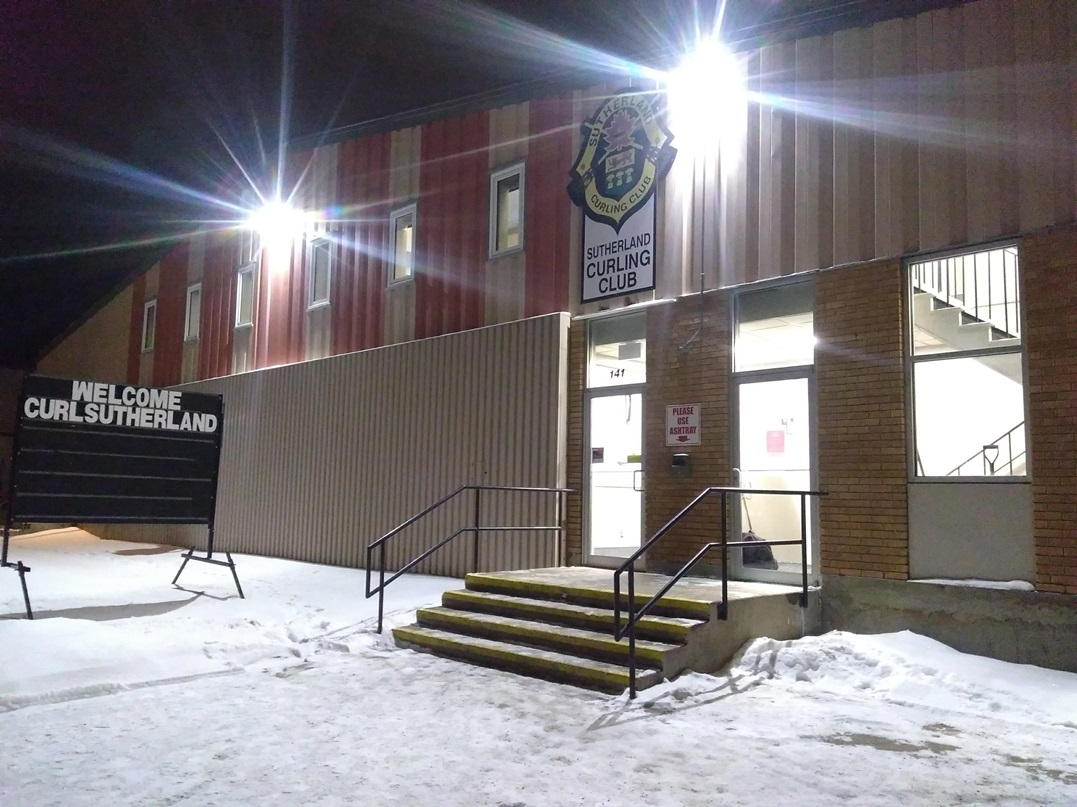
- Interactive map of Sutherland Curling Club
- Location: 141 Jessop Avenue; Saskatoon, Saskatchewan S7N 1Y3

Information
- Established: 1910
- Club type: Dedicated ice
- Curling Canada region: SCA Saskatoon Region
- Sheets of ice: Six
- Rock colours: Red and blue

The Sutherland Curling Club is an historic curling club located in the Sutherland Industrial sector of Saskatoon, Saskatchewan, Canada. The club was established in 1910 in the village of Sutherland, which became part of Saskatoon in 1956. Today, the Sutherland is the oldest curling club in the city and one of three overall, alongside the Nutana Curling Club and the CN Curling Club.

The club has been the home of four provincial women's championship rinks, including Vera Pezer's national champions, as well as a world junior champion.

== History ==
The Sutherland Curling Club was founded in 1910 in the village of Sutherland. After being rebuilt in 1922, the club burned down in 1932. The club was rebuilt in 1934 on 112th Street. The club moved to its current location on Jessop Street in 1965.

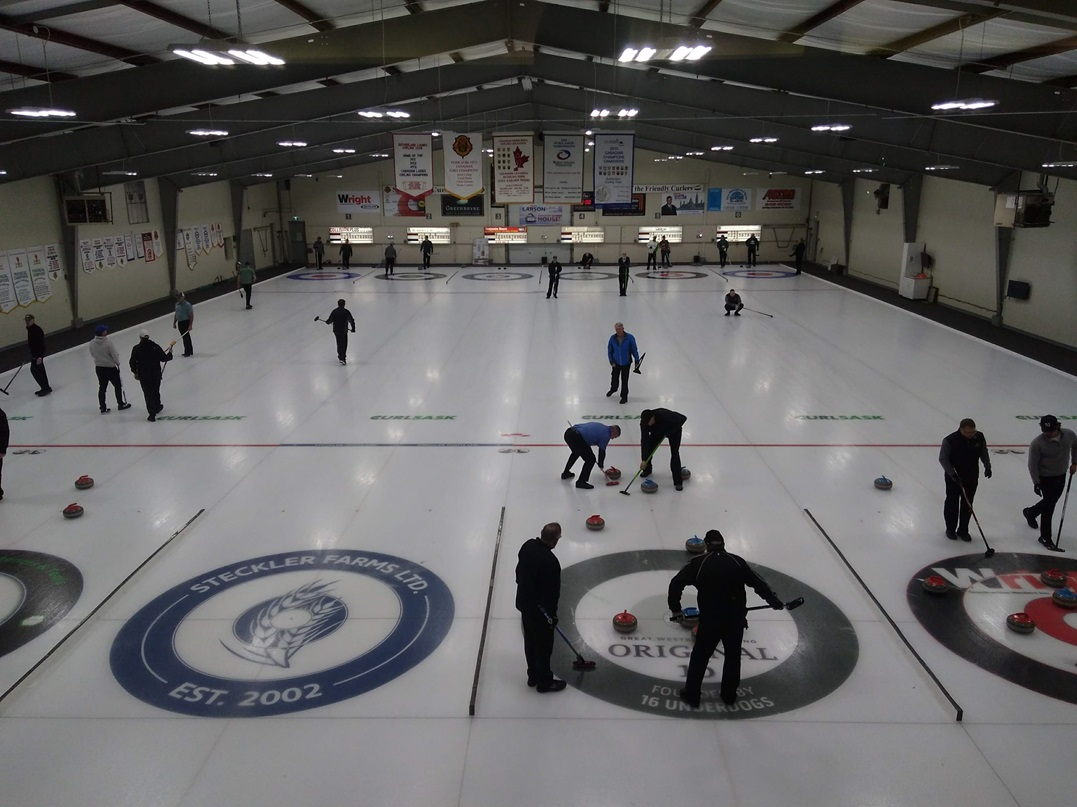
League play at Sutherland Curling Club.

=== Champions ===
The Vera Pezer rink was the first provincial championship team based out of the Sutherland. Pezer's team won three consecutive provincial titles from 1971 to 1973, and followed each provincial title up with a then-record three consecutive national titles, including one in Saskatoon in 1972. The mark of three straight national titles stood until Colleen Jones' Nova Scotia rink won four straight from 2001 to 2004. Just over ten years after Pezer's run, in 1984, the Lori McGeary rink became the most recent provincial champion from the club.

In 2003, Steve Laycock's Sutherland junior rink secured both national and world junior titles, the same year that Marliese Miller's Saskatoon Nutana rink did the same on the women's side—this marked the first year that two teams from the same country, let alone city, won the world junior title.

In 2010, the Darren Camm rink secured the first men's Canadian Curling Club Championship for Sutherland in Charlottetown.

In 2026, the Renee Wood rink won the province's first national girls' under-18 championship.

Major titles by Sutherland rinks
Year	Event	Skip	Third	Second	Lead	Nationals record
2026	Canadian U18 Curling Championships	Renee Wood	Edie Jardine	Amelia Whiting	Winnie Morin	8–1
2010	Canadian Curling Club Championship	Darren Camm	John Carlos	Mark Steckler	Michael Steckler	7–2
2003	Canadian Junior Curling Championship; World Junior Curling Championship	Steve Laycock	Chris Haichert	Michael Jantzen	Kyler Broad	12–1
1984	Scott Tournament of Hearts	Lori McGeary	Gillian Thompson	Chris Gervais	Sheila Cavanagh	8–3
1973	Saskatchewan Lassies Championship; Macdonald Lassies Championship	Vera Pezer	Sheila Rowan	Joyce McKee	Lenore Morrison	9–1
1972	Saskatchewan Lassies Championship; Macdonald Lassies Championship	Vera Pezer	Sheila Rowan	Joyce McKee	Lenore Morrison	8–1
1971	Saskatchewan Lassies Championship; Canadian Ladies Curling Association Championship	Vera Pezer	Sheila Rowan	Joyce McKee	Lenore Morrison	8–3

== See also ==
- List of curling clubs in Saskatchewan
