= 1972 Macdonald Lassies Championship =

Canadian women's curling championship

- Host city: Saskatoon, Saskatchewan
- Arena: Saskatoon Arena
- Dates: February 28–March 2
- Attendance: 15,714
- Winner: Saskatchewan
- Curling club: Sutherland Ladies CC, Saskatoon
- Skip: Vera Pezer
- Third: Sheila Rowan
- Second: Joyce McKee
- Lead: Lee Morrison

The 1972 Macdonald Lassies Championship, the Canadian women's curling championship was held February 28 to March 2, 1972 at the Saskatoon Arena, in Saskatoon, Saskatchewan. It was the first year the event was sponsored by Macdonald Tobacco, which was also the main sponsor of the Brier at the time, Canada's men's curling championship. The attendance for the week was 15,714, a record at the time.

Team Saskatchewan, who was skipped by Vera Pezer won the Lassies by finishing the round robin with an 8–1 record. It was the fourth straight title for Saskatchewan, and second straight for the Pezer rink. Pezer became the first skip to win back-to-back championships and the third skip to win multiple championships, joining teammate Joyce McKee and British Columbia's Ina Hansen. This was also the second time in which a team had won the championship on home soil joining New Brunswick in 1963 to accomplish the feat. Saskatchewan's 36 points allowed in the event set a record for the fewest points allowed in a single tournament, surpassing the 41 allowed by Saskatchewan in 1969.

Quebec's seven points in the third end against Nova Scotia tied the record for most points in a single end, which was set in 1963, also by Quebec against Nova Scotia. The record has since been matched two other times, in 2020 and 2023.

== Teams ==
The teams were as follows:

Alberta	British Columbia	Manitoba	New Brunswick	Newfoundland
Medicine Hat CC, Medicine Hat Skip: Polly Beaton; Third: Doreen DesHarnais; Second: Jan Blingert; Lead: Terry Kope	Kitimat Ladies CC, Kitimat Skip: Sharon Bettesworth; Third: Barbara Benton; Second: Kay Minchin; Lead: Sheila Reeves	Brandon CC, Brandon Skip: Audrey Williamson; Third: Mabel Mitchell; Second: Florence Yeo; Lead: Dru Dickens	Capital WC, Fredericton Skip: Sheila McLeod; Third: Barbara Douglas; Second: Ann Robinson; Lead: Isabelle Lougheed	Carol CC, Labrador City Skip: Sue-Anne Bartlett; Third: Ann Bright; Second: Frances Hiscock; Lead: Mavis Pike
Nova Scotia	Ontario	Prince Edward Island	Quebec	Saskatchewan
Greenwood Ladies CC, Greenwood Skip: Helen Rowe; Third: Rita Williams; Second: Sharon Nelson; Lead: Maureen Banyard	Thunder Bay CC, Thunder Bay Skip: Helen Sillman; Third: Norma Knudson; Second: Marilyn Walker; Lead: Elaine Tetley	Charlottetown CC, Charlottetown Skip: Marie Toole; Third: Jennie Boomhower; Second: Cathy Dillon; Lead: Pauline Johnston	Montreal Caledonia CC, Westmount Skip: Lee Tobin; Third: Pat Haslam; Second: Marilyn Hone; Lead: Michelle Garneau	Sutherland Ladies CC, Saskatoon Skip: Vera Pezer; Third: Sheila Rowan; Second: Joyce McKee; Lead: Lee Morrison

== Map of teams ==
Provincial Winners

== Round Robin standings ==
Final round robin standings

Key
Lassies champion

Province	Skip	W	L	PF	PA
Saskatchewan	Vera Pezer	8	1	80	36
Alberta	Polly Beaton	7	2	86	54
Manitoba	Audrey Williamson	7	2	83	61
Quebec	Lee Tobin	6	3	76	61
Prince Edward Island	Marie Toole	5	4	63	60
Newfoundland	Sue Anne Bartlett	4	5	70	54
Nova Scotia	Helen Rowe	3	6	53	85
British Columbia	Sharon Bettesworth	2	7	57	84
Ontario	Helen Sillman	2	7	56	88
New Brunswick	Sheila McLeod	1	8	45	86

== Round Robin results ==
All draw times are listed in Central Standard Time (UTC-06:00).

=== Draw 1 ===
Monday, February 22, 2:30 pm

Team	1	2	3	4	5	6	7	8	9	10	Final
Ontario (Sillman)	3	0	1	0	3	0	1	0	0	X	8
Manitoba (Williamson)	0	4	0	4	0	3	0	0	2	X	13

Team	1	2	3	4	5	6	7	8	9	10	Final
Prince Edward Island (Toole)	1	1	2	0	1	0	3	0	1	0	9
New Brunswick (McLeod)	0	0	0	1	0	2	0	2	0	1	6

Team	1	2	3	4	5	6	7	8	9	10	11	Final
Saskatchewan (Pezer)	3	0	3	0	0	0	0	1	0	0	0	7
Quebec (Tobin)	0	1	0	3	0	1	0	0	0	2	2	9

Team	1	2	3	4	5	6	7	8	9	10	Final
Alberta (Beaton)	0	0	2	2	0	1	0	3	4	X	12
British Columbia (Bettesworth)	1	1	0	0	1	0	4	0	0	X	7

Team	1	2	3	4	5	6	7	8	9	10	Final
Newfoundland (Bartlett)	1	0	3	0	2	0	4	0	0	X	10
Nova Scotia (Rowe)	0	3	0	1	0	1	0	1	1	X	7

=== Draw 2 ===
Monday, February 22, 8:30 pm

Team	1	2	3	4	5	6	7	8	9	10	Final
Manitoba (Williamson)	1	5	1	2	0	1	0	0	1	X	11
Nova Scotia (Rowe)	0	0	0	0	1	0	1	1	0	X	3

Team	1	2	3	4	5	6	7	8	9	10	Final
New Brunswick (McLeod)	0	0	0	0	1	0	0	1	0	X	2
Quebec (Tobin)	2	1	1	1	0	2	2	0	1	X	10

Team	1	2	3	4	5	6	7	8	9	10	Final
British Columbia (Bettesworth)	0	0	0	0	0	0	2	1	0	X	3
Prince Edward Island (Toole)	0	1	1	1	1	4	0	0	2	X	10

Team	1	2	3	4	5	6	7	8	9	10	Final
Ontario (Sillman)	0	0	1	0	0	1	0	1	X	X	3
Newfoundland (Bartlett)	1	3	0	1	4	0	3	0	X	X	12

Team	1	2	3	4	5	6	7	8	9	10	Final
Saskatchewan (Pezer)	3	0	1	0	0	1	0	1	0	X	6
Alberta (Beaton)	0	0	0	1	0	0	1	0	1	X	3

=== Draw 3 ===
Tuesday, February 23, 2:30 pm

Team	1	2	3	4	5	6	7	8	9	10	Final
Nova Scotia (Rowe)	0	0	1	1	0	1	0	1	0	X	4
Prince Edward Island (Toole)	1	2	0	0	1	0	2	0	1	X	7

Team	1	2	3	4	5	6	7	8	9	10	Final
British Columbia (Bettesworth)	0	2	0	0	1	1	1	0	1	3	9
Ontario (Sillman)	2	0	0	1	0	0	0	4	0	0	7

Team	1	2	3	4	5	6	7	8	9	10	Final
New Brunswick (McLeod)	1	0	0	1	0	1	1	2	0	X	6
Alberta (Beaton)	0	3	2	0	5	0	0	0	3	X	13

Team	1	2	3	4	5	6	7	8	9	10	Final
Quebec (Tobin)	2	0	1	0	1	0	0	1	0	X	5
Manitoba (Williamson)	0	2	0	2	0	2	0	0	4	X	10

Team	1	2	3	4	5	6	7	8	9	10	Final
Newfoundland (Bartlett)	2	1	0	0	2	0	0	0	0	X	5
Saskatchewan (Pezer)	0	0	2	1	0	4	0	1	0	X	8

=== Draw 4 ===
Tuesday, February 23, 8:30 pm

Team	1	2	3	4	5	6	7	8	9	10	Final
Ontario (Sillman)	0	1	0	1	0	1	0	0	0	X	3
Quebec (Tobin)	1	0	3	0	2	0	1	1	1	X	9

Team	1	2	3	4	5	6	7	8	9	10	Final
British Columbia (Bettesworth)	0	0	4	0	1	1	0	1	0	0	7
New Brunswick (McLeod)	1	1	0	2	0	0	1	0	1	2	8

Team	1	2	3	4	5	6	7	8	9	10	Final
Saskatchewan (Pezer)	0	2	0	1	1	0	2	3	0	X	9
Nova Scotia (Rowe)	0	0	1	0	0	1	0	0	1	X	3

Team	1	2	3	4	5	6	7	8	9	10	11	Final
Manitoba (Williamson)	0	0	2	1	0	1	0	0	1	0	1	6
Newfoundland (Bartlett)	1	0	0	0	2	0	1	0	0	1	0	5

Team	1	2	3	4	5	6	7	8	9	10	Final
Alberta (Beaton)	1	1	1	0	3	0	2	0	0	X	8
Prince Edward Island (Toole)	0	0	0	1	0	1	0	0	2	X	4

=== Draw 5 ===
Wednesday, February 23, 9:30 am

Team	1	2	3	4	5	6	7	8	9	10	Final
British Columbia (Bettesworth)	0	1	0	0	0	0	1	0	2	X	4
Saskatchewan (Pezer)	1	0	1	2	1	1	0	2	0	X	8

Team	1	2	3	4	5	6	7	8	9	10	Final
Prince Edward Island (Toole)	0	1	0	2	0	2	0	0	0	0	5
Quebec (Tobin)	1	0	1	0	1	0	0	2	0	3	8

Team	1	2	3	4	5	6	7	8	9	10	Final
Alberta (Beaton)	3	2	2	0	1	0	0	2	0	X	10
Manitoba (Williamson)	0	0	0	3	0	1	3	0	1	X	8

Team	1	2	3	4	5	6	7	8	9	10	Final
Ontario (Sillman)	0	1	0	1	4	2	0	0	0	X	8
Nova Scotia (Rowe)	2	0	2	0	0	0	2	2	5	X	13

Team	1	2	3	4	5	6	7	8	9	10	Final
Newfoundland (Bartlett)	1	1	2	1	0	2	0	0	2	0	9
New Brunswick (McLeod)	0	0	0	0	2	0	1	1	0	2	6

=== Draw 6 ===
Wednesday, February 24, 2:30 pm

Team	1	2	3	4	5	6	7	8	9	10	Final
New Brunswick (McLeod)	2	0	0	1	1	0	1	0	0	X	5
Manitoba (Williamson)	0	6	1	0	0	1	0	1	1	X	10

Team	1	2	3	4	5	6	7	8	9	10	Final
Ontario (Sillman)	3	0	2	0	0	2	0	1	0	X	8
Alberta (Beaton)	0	2	0	1	1	0	1	0	1	X	6

Team	1	2	3	4	5	6	7	8	9	10	Final
Prince Edward Island (Toole)	0	0	1	0	1	0	0	1	0	X	3
Saskatchewan (Pezer)	2	2	0	3	0	0	1	0	2	X	10

Team	1	2	3	4	5	6	7	8	9	10	Final
Newfoundland (Bartlett)	2	0	0	2	0	1	0	1	0	0	6
British Columbia (Bettesworth)	0	2	1	0	1	0	1	0	1	1	7

Team	1	2	3	4	5	6	7	8	9	10	Final
Nova Scotia (Rowe)	0	2	0	1	0	1	0	X	X	X	4
Quebec (Tobin)	1	0	7	0	3	0	3	X	X	X	14

=== Draw 7 ===
Wednesday, February 24, 8:30 pm

Team	1	2	3	4	5	6	7	8	9	10	Final
Manitoba (Williamson)	0	0	1	0	2	0	1	0	X	X	4
Saskatchewan (Pezer)	3	4	0	2	0	1	0	3	X	X	13

Team	1	2	3	4	5	6	7	8	9	10	Final
Prince Edward Island (Toole)	3	1	1	0	2	0	0	1	0	X	8
Newfoundland (Bartlett)	0	0	0	2	0	1	2	0	2	X	7

Team	1	2	3	4	5	6	7	8	9	10	Final
Ontario (Sillman)	0	1	1	2	0	0	4	1	0	X	9
New Brunswick (McLeod)	1	0	0	0	3	0	0	0	2	X	6

Team	1	2	3	4	5	6	7	8	9	10	Final
Alberta (Beaton)	1	0	0	1	0	4	0	0	4	1	11
Quebec (Tobin)	0	0	3	0	2	0	1	2	0	0	8

Team	1	2	3	4	5	6	7	8	9	10	Final
Nova Scotia (Rowe)	0	1	0	0	3	0	1	1	0	2	8
British Columbia (Bettesworth)	1	0	2	1	0	1	0	0	1	0	6

=== Draw 8 ===
Thursday, February 25, 2:30 pm

Team	1	2	3	4	5	6	7	8	9	10	Final
Alberta (Beaton)	2	2	2	3	3	0	0	4	X	X	16
Nova Scotia (Rowe)	0	0	0	0	0	1	1	0	X	X	2

Team	1	2	3	4	5	6	7	8	9	10	Final
Quebec (Tobin)	0	1	0	0	0	0	1	0	X	X	2
Newfoundland (Bartlett)	2	0	1	3	2	2	0	1	X	X	11

Team	1	2	3	4	5	6	7	8	9	10	Final
Manitoba (Williamson)	3	0	3	1	0	0	5	1	1	X	14
British Columbia (Bettesworth)	0	1	0	0	1	4	0	0	0	X	6

Team	1	2	3	4	5	6	7	8	9	10	Final
Saskatchewan (Pezer)	0	0	2	2	2	2	2	0	X	X	10
New Brunswick (McLeod)	2	0	0	0	0	0	0	0	X	X	2

Team	1	2	3	4	5	6	7	8	9	10	Final
Prince Edward Island (Toole)	0	1	0	0	3	0	1	0	6	X	11
Ontario (Sillman)	1	0	3	1	0	1	0	1	0	X	7

=== Draw 9 ===
Thursday, February 25, 8:30 pm

Team	1	2	3	4	5	6	7	8	9	10	Final
Quebec (Tobin)	1	3	0	3	0	0	1	0	0	3	11
British Columbia (Bettesworth)	0	0	1	0	3	2	0	1	1	0	8

Team	1	2	3	4	5	6	7	8	9	10	Final
Saskatchewan (Pezer)	1	0	1	0	0	0	2	4	1	X	9
Ontario (Sillman)	0	0	0	1	0	2	0	0	0	X	3

Team	1	2	3	4	5	6	7	8	9	10	Final
Newfoundland (Bartlett)	1	0	0	0	2	1	0	0	1	0	5
Alberta (Beaton)	0	2	0	1	0	0	1	1	0	2	7

Team	1	2	3	4	5	6	7	8	9	10	Final
Prince Edward Island (Toole)	1	0	2	0	0	1	0	0	2	0	6
Manitoba (Williamson)	0	1	0	1	1	0	1	1	0	2	7

Team	1	2	3	4	5	6	7	8	9	10	Final
New Brunswick (McLeod)	0	2	1	0	0	1	0	0	0	X	4
Nova Scotia (Rowe)	1	0	0	2	3	0	1	1	1	X	9
