= 1971 Canadian Ladies Curling Association Championship =

Canadian women's curling championship

- Host city: St. John's, Newfoundland
- Arena: Memorial Stadium
- Dates: February 22–26
- Winner: Saskatchewan
- Curling club: Sutherland Ladies CC, Saskatoon
- Skip: Vera Pezer
- Third: Sheila Rowan
- Second: Joyce McKee
- Lead: Lee Morrison
- Finalist: Alberta (Kay Baldwin); British Columbia (Ina Hansen)

The 1971 Canadian Ladies Curling Association Championship, the Canadian women's curling championship was held February 22 to 26, 1971 at Memorial Stadium, in St. John's, Newfoundland.

For the second consecutive year, there would be a three-way tiebreaker playoff to determine the championship as Alberta, British Columbia, and Saskatchewan all finished round robin play with 6–3 records. Team Saskatchewan, who was skipped by Vera Pezer captured the championship by defeating both British Columbia 10–7 in the semifinal and Alberta 9–2 in the final. This was Saskatchewan's fourth championship and third in a row. This would be the first of three straight titles for Pezer. Pezer's second, Joyce McKee became the first player to have won three Canadian women's championships as McKee previously won as a skip in 1961 and 1969.

The event had particularly good ice conditions for the time, due in part to cool weather and small crowds. The small crowds were blamed on a lack of a middle class in Newfoundland, and the small numbers of curlers in the province.

British Columbia's 3–2 victory over Saskatchewan in Draw 5 set two tournament records for the fewest combined points scored between two teams in one game (5) and the most blank ends in one game (5). The lowest combined score would be matched four more times (1986, 1988, and twice in 1999). The blank ends record was matched in 1981 and eventually was broken in 1986.

The Nova Scotia rink ended up becoming the third team to finish round robin play winless. At the time, the team set tournament records for most points allowed (112), fewest points scored (43), and worst point differential (-69).

== Teams ==
The teams were as follows:

Alberta	British Columbia	Manitoba	New Brunswick	Newfoundland
Granite CC, Edmonton Skip: Kay Baldwin; Third: Joyce Bucholz; Second: Shriley Mitchell; Lead: Gladys Tainish	Kimberley Ladies CC, Kimberley Skip: Ina Hansen; Third: Ada Calles; Second: Carol Klinck; Lead: Gilberte Bailey	Brandon CC, Brandon Skip: Mabel Mitchell; Third: Mildred Murray; Second: Evelyn Bird; Lead: June Clark	Bathurst Ladies CC, Bathurst Skip: Shirley Pilson; Third: Anne Orser; Second: Patricia Maher; Lead: Geraldine Lenihan	Carol CC, Labrador City Skip: Sue-Anne Bartlett; Third: Ann Bright; Second: Frances Hiscock; Lead: Mavis Pike
Nova Scotia	Ontario	Prince Edward Island	Quebec	Saskatchewan
Stellar CC, Stellarton Skip: Clare Purdy; Third: Florence Ives; Second: Joan MacLeod; Lead: Betty Rann	Thunder Bay CC, Thunder Bay Skip: Helen Sillman; Third: Norma Knudson; Second: Elaine Tetley; Lead: Marilyn Walker	Charlottetown CC, Charlottetown Skip: Marie Toole; Third: Jennie Boomhower; Second: Cathy Dillon; Lead: Pauline Johnston	Port Alfred CC, Port-Alfred Skip: Nicole Janelle; Third: Paulette Janelle; Second: Doris LaPointe; Lead: Denise Cote	Sutherland Ladies CC, Saskatoon Skip: Vera Pezer; Third: Sheila Rowan; Second: Joyce McKee; Lead: Lee Morrison

== Map of teams ==
Provincial Winners

== Round Robin standings ==
Final Round Robin standings

Key
Teams to Tiebreaker

Province	Skip	W	L	PF	PA
British Columbia	Ina Hansen	6	3	75	66
Alberta	Kay Baldwin	6	3	89	62
Saskatchewan	Vera Pezer	6	3	71	56
Manitoba	Mabel Mitchell	5	4	77	72
Quebec	Nicole Janelle	5	4	84	61
Prince Edward Island	Marie Toole	5	4	66	72
Ontario	Helen Sillman	5	4	62	66
Newfoundland	Sue Anne Bartlett	4	5	71	66
New Brunswick	Shirley Pilson	3	6	67	72
Nova Scotia	Clare Purdy	0	9	43	112

== Round Robin results ==
All times are listed in Newfoundland Standard Time (UTC-03:30).

=== Draw 1 ===
Monday, February 22, 2:30 pm

Team	1	2	3	4	5	6	7	8	9	10	Final
New Brunswick (Pilson)	1	0	3	1	0	2	0	2	1	3	13
Nova Scotia (Purdy)	0	2	0	0	1	0	1	0	0	0	4

Team	1	2	3	4	5	6	7	8	9	10	11	Final
Manitoba (Mitchell)	1	0	0	1	1	0	1	2	0	3	0	9
Alberta (Baldwin)	0	2	3	0	0	1	0	0	3	0	1	10

Team	1	2	3	4	5	6	7	8	9	10	Final
Ontario (Sillman)	0	0	0	1	2	0	0	0	0	X	3
Quebec (Janelle)	1	1	0	0	0	1	2	1	1	X	7

Team	1	2	3	4	5	6	7	8	9	10	Final
Saskatchewan (Pezer)	1	0	1	1	0	3	0	5	0	0	11
Newfoundland (Bartlett)	0	3	0	0	1	0	3	0	1	1	9

Team	1	2	3	4	5	6	7	8	9	10	Final
British Columbia (Hansen)	0	2	0	0	1	0	0	3	0	1	7
Prince Edward Island (Toole)	1	0	1	1	0	2	1	0	3	0	9

=== Draw 2 ===
Monday, February 22, 8:00 pm

Team	1	2	3	4	5	6	7	8	9	10	Final
Prince Edward Island (Toole)	0	0	2	0	0	1	0	0	1	3	7
Newfoundland (Bartlett)	2	1	0	2	2	0	1	1	0	0	9

Team	1	2	3	4	5	6	7	8	9	10	Final
Ontario (Sillman)	0	1	0	0	2	0	0	1	0	1	5
Saskatchewan (Pezer)	1	0	0	1	0	1	1	0	0	0	4

Team	1	2	3	4	5	6	7	8	9	10	Final
Alberta (Baldwin)	2	0	2	1	0	2	0	3	2	2	14
Nova Scotia (Purdy)	0	1	0	0	1	0	1	0	0	0	3

Team	1	2	3	4	5	6	7	8	9	10	11	Final
British Columbia (Hansen)	1	2	0	1	0	2	1	1	0	0	1	9
New Brunswick (Pilson)	0	0	3	0	1	0	0	0	2	2	0	8

Team	1	2	3	4	5	6	7	8	9	10	Final
Manitoba (Mitchell)	2	0	1	0	0	0	1	2	2	0	8
Quebec (Janelle)	0	2	0	2	1	1	0	0	0	1	7

=== Draw 3 ===
Tuesday, February 23, 2:30 pm

Team	1	2	3	4	5	6	7	8	9	10	11	Final
British Columbia (Hansen)	0	3	1	1	0	1	0	3	0	0	1	10
Alberta (Baldwin)	0	0	0	0	3	0	1	0	4	1	0	9

Team	1	2	3	4	5	6	7	8	9	10	Final
New Brunswick (Pilson)	0	0	0	2	0	1	0	0	0	X	3
Quebec (Janelle)	2	2	1	0	1	0	3	1	1	X	11

Team	1	2	3	4	5	6	7	8	9	10	Final
Manitoba (Mitchell)	1	0	2	0	1	0	2	1	0	1	8
Newfoundland (Bartlett)	0	1	0	1	0	2	0	0	1	0	5

Team	1	2	3	4	5	6	7	8	9	10	Final
Ontario (Sillman)	0	2	0	0	0	1	1	1	0	0	5
Prince Edward Island (Toole)	1	0	1	0	2	0	0	0	4	1	9

Team	1	2	3	4	5	6	7	8	9	10	Final
Saskatchewan (Pezer)	4	1	0	3	2	0	3	0	X	X	13
Nova Scotia (Purdy)	0	0	1	0	0	1	0	1	X	X	3

=== Draw 4 ===
Tuesday, February 23, 8:00 pm

Team	1	2	3	4	5	6	7	8	9	10	Final
Saskatchewan (Pezer)	0	0	3	1	0	1	0	5	0	X	10
Quebec (Janelle)	1	1	0	0	3	0	1	0	1	X	7

Team	1	2	3	4	5	6	7	8	9	10	Final
British Columbia (Hansen)	2	1	1	0	1	1	0	0	1	2	9
Manitoba (Mitchell)	0	0	0	3	0	0	6	1	0	0	10

Team	1	2	3	4	5	6	7	8	9	10	Final
New Brunswick (Pilson)	1	0	1	0	1	1	0	0	0	1	5
Prince Edward Island (Toole)	0	1	0	1	0	0	3	0	3	0	8

Team	1	2	3	4	5	6	7	8	9	10	Final
Nova Scotia (Purdy)	0	1	0	0	0	0	2	0	1	X	4
Newfoundland (Bartlett)	2	0	2	2	1	2	0	3	0	X	12

Team	1	2	3	4	5	6	7	8	9	10	Final
Ontario (Sillman)	1	0	1	0	0	0	0	3	0	X	5
Alberta (Baldwin)	0	4	0	1	1	1	2	0	1	X	10

=== Draw 5 ===
Wednesday, February 24, 9:30 am

Team	1	2	3	4	5	6	7	8	9	10	11	Final
Ontario (Sillman)	1	0	2	0	0	1	0	2	0	1	2	9
Manitoba (Mitchell)	0	1	0	4	0	0	1	0	1	0	0	7

Team	1	2	3	4	5	6	7	8	9	10	Final
Prince Edward Island (Toole)	1	1	0	2	0	1	2	0	0	2	9
Nova Scotia (Purdy)	0	0	2	0	2	0	0	3	1	0	8

Team	1	2	3	4	5	6	7	8	9	10	Final
British Columbia (Hansen)	0	0	1	0	0	0	1	0	0	1	3
Saskatchewan (Pezer)	0	0	0	0	0	1	0	1	0	0	2

Team	1	2	3	4	5	6	7	8	9	10	Final
Alberta (Baldwin)	0	1	1	0	3	0	4	3	X	X	12
New Brunswick (Pilson)	0	0	0	2	0	1	0	0	X	X	3

Team	1	2	3	4	5	6	7	8	9	10	Final
Newfoundland (Bartlett)	2	1	0	1	0	1	3	0	1	X	9
Quebec (Janelle)	0	0	1	0	1	0	0	2	0	X	4

=== Draw 6 ===
Wednesday, February 24, 2:30 pm

Team	1	2	3	4	5	6	7	8	9	10	Final
New Brunswick (Pilson)	0	0	0	2	0	1	2	0	1	0	6
Saskatchewan (Pezer)	2	1	2	0	2	0	0	1	0	2	10

Team	1	2	3	4	5	6	7	8	9	10	11	Final
Alberta (Baldwin)	1	0	0	0	0	1	0	1	4	0	2	9
Newfoundland (Bartlett)	0	1	1	1	1	0	2	0	0	1	0	7

Team	1	2	3	4	5	6	7	8	9	10	Final
Prince Edward Island (Toole)	1	0	1	0	0	0	1	0	0	X	3
Quebec (Janelle)	0	3	0	1	1	2	0	5	1	X	13

Team	1	2	3	4	5	6	7	8	9	10	Final
Manitoba (Mitchell)	3	2	0	2	0	2	4	0	X	X	13
Nova Scotia (Purdy)	0	0	1	0	2	0	0	3	X	X	6

Team	1	2	3	4	5	6	7	8	9	10	Final
British Columbia (Hansen)	0	3	0	0	1	1	1	0	0	0	6
Ontario (Sillman)	1	0	1	1	0	0	0	1	2	2	8

=== Draw 7 ===
Wednesday, February 24, 8:00 pm

Team	1	2	3	4	5	6	7	8	9	10	Final
Manitoba (Mitchell)	2	1	0	2	0	3	0	1	0	X	9
Prince Edward Island (Toole)	0	0	1	0	2	0	2	0	1	X	6

Team	1	2	3	4	5	6	7	8	9	10	Final
Ontario (Sillman)	1	3	0	4	0	3	0	0	1	X	12
Nova Scotia (Purdy)	0	0	1	0	2	0	1	1	0	X	5

Team	1	2	3	4	5	6	7	8	9	10	Final
Saskatchewan (Pezer)	0	0	0	1	0	0	1	0	2	X	4
Alberta (Baldwin)	2	2	4	0	1	1	0	1	0	X	11

Team	1	2	3	4	5	6	7	8	9	10	11	Final
British Columbia (Hansen)	5	0	1	0	2	1	1	0	0	0	2	12
Quebec (Janelle)	0	1	0	1	0	0	0	3	3	2	0	10

Team	1	2	3	4	5	6	7	8	9	10	Final
New Brunswick (Pilson)	0	0	0	0	0	1	0	2	1	X	4
Newfoundland (Bartlett)	4	1	1	1	1	0	1	0	0	X	9

=== Draw 8 ===
Thursday, February 25, 2:30 pm

Team	1	2	3	4	5	6	7	8	9	10	Final
Quebec (Janelle)	0	3	3	0	2	0	4	0	1	1	14
Nova Scotia (Purdy)	1	0	0	1	0	2	0	2	0	0	6

Team	1	2	3	4	5	6	7	8	9	10	Final
British Columbia (Hansen)	1	1	1	0	1	1	0	1	0	1	7
Newfoundland (Bartlett)	0	0	0	2	0	0	2	0	2	0	6

Team	1	2	3	4	5	6	7	8	9	10	Final
Ontario (Sillman)	1	0	1	0	1	0	0	0	X	X	3
New Brunswick (Pilson)	0	3	0	2	0	3	2	3	X	X	13

Team	1	2	3	4	5	6	7	8	9	10	Final
Saskatchewan (Pezer)	0	3	0	2	0	1	1	1	0	0	8
Manitoba (Mitchell)	1	0	1	0	3	0	0	0	1	1	7

Team	1	2	3	4	5	6	7	8	9	10	Final
Alberta (Baldwin)	0	1	0	0	2	0	2	0	2	0	7
Prince Edward Island (Toole)	1	0	2	1	0	2	0	2	0	2	10

=== Draw 9 ===
Thursday, February 25, 8:00 pm

Team	1	2	3	4	5	6	7	8	9	10	Final
Ontario (Sillman)	0	3	3	0	2	0	1	0	3	X	12
Newfoundland (Bartlett)	1	0	0	0	0	1	0	3	0	X	5

Team	1	2	3	4	5	6	7	8	9	10	Final
Saskatchewan (Pezer)	2	1	0	0	1	0	2	0	3	X	9
Prince Edward Island (Toole)	0	0	2	1	0	1	0	1	0	X	5

Team	1	2	3	4	5	6	7	8	9	10	Final
British Columbia (Hansen)	0	1	3	1	0	1	2	0	1	3	12
Nova Scotia (Purdy)	2	0	0	0	1	0	0	1	0	0	4

Team	1	2	3	4	5	6	7	8	9	10	Final
Alberta (Baldwin)	1	0	1	0	3	0	2	0	0	0	7
Quebec (Janelle)	0	2	0	2	0	2	0	1	2	2	11

Team	1	2	3	4	5	6	7	8	9	10	Final
New Brunswick (Pilson)	0	5	0	0	2	0	1	3	1	X	12
Manitoba (Mitchell)	2	0	1	1	0	2	0	0	0	X	6

== Tiebreakers ==
Semifinal			Final
			1	Alberta	2
2	Saskatchewan	10		Saskatchewan	9
3	British Columbia	7

=== Semifinal ===
Friday, February 26, 9:30 am

Team	1	2	3	4	5	6	7	8	9	10	11	Final
British Columbia (Hansen)	1	0	2	0	1	0	1	0	1	1	0	7
Saskatchewan (Pezer)	0	2	0	2	0	2	0	1	0	0	3	10

=== Final ===
Friday, February 26, 2:30 pm

Team	1	2	3	4	5	6	7	8	9	10	Final
Saskatchewan (Pezer)	0	1	0	2	0	1	1	2	2	X	9
Alberta (Baldwin)	0	0	1	0	1	0	0	0	0	X	2
