= 1994 Canadian Senior Curling Championships =

The 1994 Canadian Senior Curling Championships, Canada's national championship for curlers over 50, were held March 19 to 26, 1994 at the Hillcrest Sports Centre in Moose Jaw, Saskatchewan.

Alberta, skipped by Cordella "Red" Schwengler won the women's event, defeating Newfoundland's Sue Anne Bartlett in the final. The Alberta rink had been adopted as the fan favourites in the final, as their third Betty Clarke was a native-Saskatchewanian. The team went undefeated in the round robin before losing their last two games, settling for third place heading into the playoffs. The opposing skip, Sue Anne Bartlett, was playing in her first senior championship. At the time, she had a record 12 appearances at the Scott Tournament of Hearts Canadian women's championships, and had lost just one round robin match.

New Brunswick, skipped by David Sullivan won the men's event, defeating British Columbia's Jim Horswell rink. The win added a trophy to the list of Sullivan family accolades which included a win by his son Jim and nephew Charlie and at the 1988 World Junior Curling Championships, where David was the coach.

== Men's ==
=== Teams ===
The men's teams were as follows:

Province / Territory	Skip	Third	Second	Lead	Locale
Alberta	Al Pankoski	Bert Proskiw	Mitch Hansuk	Herb Zmurchuk	Edmonton
British Columbia	Jim Horswell	John Burbee	Neil King	Bob Miscovitch	Prince George
Manitoba	Barry Fry	Don Duguid	Terry Braunstein	Ray Turnbull	Winnipeg
New Brunswick	David Sullivan	Walter Nason	Roland Lord	William Ayer	Fredericton
Northern Ontario	Roy Lund	Terry Johnson	John Bowiec	Nick Kozak	Kenora
Nova Scotia	Stewart Mann	Wayne Gorman	John Hiltz	Don Batten	Truro
Ontario	Jim Sharples	Art Lobel	Joe Gurowka	Brian Longley	Toronto
Prince Edward Island	Roger Goss	Robert Dillon	John Stewart	Paul Szczygiel	Charlottetown
Quebec	Maurice Bourbonnais	Bob Laroche	Jean Jacques Lafontaine	Royal Sabourin	Buckingham
Newfoundland	Roger Maybey	Jim Wells	Tom Warren	Selwyn Warren	St. John's
Saskatchewan	Gord Johnson	Ernie Cherwyk	Garry Robertson	Alex Riddy	Yorkton
Yukon/Northwest Territories	Garry Miller	Allan Gee	Clarence Jack	Dwayne Backstrom	Whitehorse

=== Standings ===
Final round-robin standings.

Key
Teams to playoff

Locale	Skip	W	L
British Columbia	Jim Horswell	8	3
New Brunswick	David Sullivan	8	3
Alberta	Al Pankoski	8	3
Manitoba	Barry Fry	8	3
Ontario	Jim Sharples	6	5
Yukon/Northwest Territories	Garry Miller	5	6
Newfoundland	Roger Maybey	5	6
Northern Ontario	Roy Lund	5	6
Saskatchewan	Gord Johnson	5	6
Prince Edward Island	Roger Goss	4	7
Quebec	Maurice Bourbonnais	3	8
Nova Scotia	Stewart Mann	1	10

=== Playoffs ===
Due to the four-way tie for first, a four team playoff was adopted rather than the usual three.

Semifinals
British Columbia	6
Manitoba	5
New Brunswick	8
Alberta	4

Final
British Columbia	5
New Brunswick	4

==== Final ====
March 26, 1:00pm

Team	1	2	3	4	5	6	7	8	9	10	Final
New Brunswick (Sullivan)	1	0	3	0	0	0	0	1	1	0	6
British Columbia (Horswell)	0	2	0	1	0	0	1	0	0	1	5

== Women's ==
=== Teams ===
The women's teams were as follows:

Province / Territory	Skip	Third	Second	Lead	Locale
Alberta	Cordella Schwengler	Marj Stewart	Betty Clarke	Nora Eaves	Calgary
British Columbia	Eve Skakun	Una Hazen	Sandy Allen	Elizabeth Karpluk	Kamloops
Manitoba	Mariyln Sigurdson	June Reece	Patricia Gould	Diana Klinck	Winnipeg
New Brunswick	Ellen Brennan	Joan Freeman	Rose Donovan	Jeannine Tucker	Saint John
Newfoundland	Sue Anne Bartlett	Ruby Crocker	Gertrude Peck	Betty McLean	Labrador City
Northern Ontario	Sheila Ross	Linda Anderson	Lucille Frick	Raylene D'Agostino	Sudbury
Nova Scotia	Mary Harper	Elise Doane	Marilyn Corkum	Shirley Ann Rankin	Halifax
Ontario	Jill Greenwood	Yvonne Smith	Victoria Lauder	Maymar Gemmell	Mississauga
Prince Edward Island	Genevieve Enman	Maria Gaudet	Wanda MacLean	Marilyn Banks	Summerside
Quebec	Louiselle Munger	Monique Burgess	Patricia Tardif	Nora Amiot	Baie-Comeau
Saskatchewan	Emily Farnham	Pat Buglass	Marilynne Earl	Lori Harvie	Saskatoon
Yukon/Northwest Territories	Madeline Boyd	Arla Repka	Peggy Duncan	Elizabeth Friesen	Whitehorse

=== Standings ===
Final round-robin standings.

Key
Teams to playoff

Locale	Skip	W	L
Newfoundland	Sue Anne Bartlett	10	1
Ontario	Jill Greenwood	9	2
Alberta	Cordella Schwengler	9	2
Saskatchewan	Emily Farnham	7	4
British Columbia	Eve Skakun	6	5
New Brunswick	Ellen Brennan	6	5
Manitoba	Marilyn Sigurdson	6	5
Northern Ontario	Sheila Ross	5	6
Prince Edward Island	Genevieve Enman	3	8
Quebec	Louiselle Munger	2	9
Nova Scotia	Mary Harper	2	9
Yukon/Northwest Territories	Madeline Boyd	1	10

=== Playoffs ===
Semifinal		Final
Ontario	5
Alberta	6	Newfoundland	5
		Alberta	9

==== Final ====
March 26, 1:00pm

Team	1	2	3	4	5	6	7	8	9	10	Final
Alberta (Schwengler)	0	1	0	3	1	0	0	1	1	2	9
Newfoundland (Bartlett)	0	1	2	0	0	1	1	0	0	0	5
