= Joyce McKee =

Personal information
- Born: October 29, 1933 Asquith, Saskatchewan, Canada
- Died: December 28, 1999 (aged 66) Saskatoon, Saskatchewan, Canada

Sport
- Sport: curling

Helen Joyce McKee (October 29, 1933 – December 28 or 29, 1999) was a Canadian curler from Saskatoon, Saskatchewan. She was a five-time Canadian champion.

Born in Asquith, Saskatchewan, McKee won her very first provincial title as a skip in 1954, before the creation of a Canadian women's championship. She won again in 1960, earning the right to play at the Western Canada Women's Curling Championship in Victoria, British Columbia. Her Saskatchewan rink defeated Alberta 14–11 in the Western final, and was invited to play the Eastern Canadian champion Ruth Smith rink from Quebec in an unofficial championship in Oshawa, Ontario. McKee's team defeated the Quebec team in two matches, 11–3 and 8–5.

The following season, the McKee rink once again won the provincial title. This time, the Canadian Ladies' Curling Association organized a national championship with a similar format to the Brier, the Canadian men's championship. This first event would be called the 1961 Diamond D Championship, and it was held at the Ottawa Hunt and Golf Club in Ottawa. McKee and her rink of Sylvia Fedoruk, Barbara MacNevin, Rosa McFee won the new event, finishing with an undefeated 9-0 record.

In 1969, McKee returned to national championship, skipping the team of Vera Pezer, Lenore Morrison and Jennifer Falk to another Saskatchewan and Canadian championship. The team was tied with Ontario in their final round robin game with a 7–1 record. They happened to play Ontario in their final game which they won, 6–5, earning them the championship. The team then changed its lineup to have Pezer skip and McKee throw second stones, and brought in Sheila Rowan to throw third stones. This team won three more Saskatchewan and Canadian national championships (1971, 1972, 1973).

Later in life, McKee won the 1992 Canadian Senior Curling Championships playing lead for the Sheila Rowan rink.

Outside of curling, McKee was employed in the parts department by Merlin Motors.
