= Sue Anne Bartlett =

Canadian curler

Medal record

Women's Curling

Representing Newfoundland

Scott Tournament of Hearts
| Silver medal – second place | 1981 St. John's | |
| Silver medal – second place | 1985 Winnipeg | |
| Bronze medal – third place | 1979 Mount Royal | |
| Bronze medal – third place | 1986 London | |

Sylvia "Sue" Anne Bartlett (born 1942) is a Canadian curler, originally from Labrador City. A member of the Canadian Curling Hall of Fame, she is a 12-time Newfoundland provincial women's champion, and two-time runner up at the Canadian women's curling championship.

Born in Grand Falls, Newfoundland, Bartlett moved to Labrador City in 1963 and began curling in 1964.

== Career ==
=== Women's ===
Bartlett and her rink of Ann Bright, Francis Hiscock and Mavis Pike won their first provincial women's championship in 1971, earning the team the right to represent Newfoundland at the 1971 Canadian Ladies Curling Association Championship in their home province. In their first national championship, the rink went 4–5, finishing in 7th place. Later that season, Bartlett won a provincial mixed title in 1971, playing third on a team skipped by Horst Illing. At the 1971 Canadian Mixed Curling Championship, the team finished with a 2–8 record.

Bartlett, Bright, Hiscock and Pike won their second provincial title in 1972. At the 1972 Canadian championship, known then as the Macdonald Lassie, the team finished with another 4–5 record, in sixth place. The four won their third provincial title in 1974. At the 1974 Macdonald Lassies Championship, the team improved on their previous two records, finishing 5–4, finishing in sixth place.

Bartlett won her fourth provincial title in 1976 with new third Patricia Dwyer replacing Bright on the team. At the 1976 Macdonald Lassies Championship, the team finished with another 4–5 record, in a three-way tie for sixth.

The team won their fifth provincial women's title in 1978 with new second Joyce Butt (Narduzzi) replacing Hiscock. At the 1978 Macdonald Lassies Championship, they finished with an even 5–5 record, tied for fifth place. The team won a second straight provincial championship in 1979. The 1979 Macdonald Lassies Championship was their best national championship to that point. The team finished the round robin with a 7–3 record, in a five-way tie for second place. This put the team into a tiebreaker scenario, where they were ranked fifth of the five tied teams. In their third game of the day, they beat Quebec, skipped by Lorraine Bowes 9–3 in the first tie breaker. They then had to play Saskatchewan, skipped by Barb Despins in the second tiebreaker, in their fourth match of the day. Exhausted, the team managed to beat Saskatchewan 12–10 after Despins missed an open hit in the last end, and promoted a Newfoundland stone. Seven and half hours later, Bartlett was back on the ice for the semifinal against 1978 Canadian champion Chris Pidzarko rink representing Manitoba. In their fifth game in 27 hours, the team were easily defeated 10–2, finishing third overall.

The next season, Narduzzi was replaced at second on the team by Beverley Whitten. The team won their third straight provincial in 1980. At the newly named 1980 Canadian Ladies Curling Association Championship, the team finished with a disappointing 4–6 record, tied for seventh overall. The team won a fourth straight provincial title in 1981, with a new front-end of Jo Ann Bepperling at lead and Narduzzi back on the team at second. This sent the team to the 1981 Canadian Ladies Curling Association Championship was hosted by their home province in St. John's. There, the team had a strong round robin showing, finishing with a 7–3 record, in third place. This put the team into the semifinal against Manitoba, skipped by Joan Ingram. Bartlett downed Manitoba 6–5 in front of 2,890 fans, after Ingram missed an "almost impossible shot" in the last end, giving up a steal. This put Newfoundland into the final against Alberta, skipped by Susan Seitz. Seitz had only lost one game in the round robin, and that was against Newfoundland. The team did not play as well as they had in the semifinal, losing to Alberta 7–3 in front of approximately 3,000 fans. In the final, Bartlett only curled 57%, much worse than her average for the week of 68%, compared to Seitz who curled 67% in the final.

Bartlett would not win another provincial championship until 1985, when she won her ninth trip to the national championship (now called the Tournament of Hearts) with a new front end of Margaret Knickle and Debra Herbert (Porter). The team represented Newfoundland at the 1985 Scott Tournament of Hearts, where they finished with another 7–3 record, in a three-way tie for second with Alberta and Nova Scotia. This put them in a tiebreaker game against Alberta, once again skipped by Susan Seitz, a game which Bartlett described as being "close" to a grudge match. Bartlett easily defeated Seitz 8–2, putting them into the semifinal against Nova Scotia, skipped by Virginia Jackson. Nova Scotia had earned a direct entry to the semis by drawing straws against the other two teams. Newfoundland easily beat Nova Scotia as well, sending Bartlett to the final against British Columbia's Linda Moore rink. In the final, Newfoundland gave up a five-end in the first end, and were down 8–0 after three. The team battled back, but it was too little, too late, and ended up losing to B.C. 13–7.

Bartlett again won provincials in 1986, with Narduzzi back at second. At the 1986 Scott Tournament of Hearts, she led Newfoundland to 7–4 round robin record, in third place. This put them into the semifinal against Team Canada (the defending champion Linda Moore rink), in a rematch of the 1985 final. The semifinal was a much lower scoring affair than the 1985 final, but the end result was the same, with Moore winning, 3–2. Bartlett missed a blank attempt in the eighth, forcing her to take one, giving Moore the hammer in the ninth in a 2–2 tie. After blanking the ninth, Moore drew to score a single point in the tenth to win the game.

Four years later, Bartlett won her 11th provincial title with Wendy Chaulk now at lead, and Porter throwing second stones, replacing Narduzzi. Her 11th appearance at the 1990 Scott Tournament of Hearts set a record at the time for most appearances at the Canadian women's championship. At the Hearts, she finished with a 6–5 record, tied for fourth place. After the season, Dwyer and Chaulk left the team as Dwyer had moved to Kingston and Chaulk was being transferred out of Labrador City.

Bartlett won her final Newfoundland provincial women's championship in 1992 with a new team consisting of Marcie Brown, Helen Nichols and Kathy Combden. Porter was also on the team as an alternate, but was seven months pregnant. At the 1992 Scott Tournament of Hearts, Bartlett had her worst ever tournament, going 1–10. Even with the lone win, Bartlett finished the tournament as the winningest curler (male or female) ever at a Canadian championship at the time, with a career 66 wins. The record was broken in 1994 when Colleen Jones won her 67th game.

=== Seniors ===
After turning 50, Bartlett was eligible to play in seniors curling. Bartlett won six Newfoundland and Labrador provincial seniors titles (1994, 1996, 1997, 1998, 1999, 2000). In 2000, she moved to Nova Scotia where she won two Nova Scotia provincial senior titles in 2004 and 2005. Her provincial seniors titles qualified her to play in the Canadian Senior Curling Championships. In her first trip in 1994, she and her rink of Ruby Crocker, Gertrude Peck and Betty McLean made it to the final where she lost to Alberta, skipped by Cordella Schwengler. At the 1996 Canadian Senior Curling Championships, she finished 5–6, in 1997 she finished 7–4 (with team mates Jean Rockwell, McLean and Peck), in 1998 she finished 4–7 (with team mates Shirley Manuel, Peck and Elinor Udell), in 1999 she finished 4–7 again (with team mates Manuel, Cynthia Mills and Ruby Starkes) and in 2000 she lost in the semifinal (with team mates Cynthia Young, Marg Collingwood and Mills). Representing Nova Scotia for the first time, Bartlett led her team of Penny LaRocque, Karen Hennigar and Jane Brett to a 7–4 record at the 2004 Canadian Senior Curling Championships. And, at the 2005 Canadian Senior Curling Championships with new lead Marjorie MacKay, the team again finished with a 7–4 record, but lost in a tiebreaker.

=== Masters career ===
As the skip of Team Nova Scotia, she won two Canadian Masters Curling Championships (in 2006 with Adine Boutilier, Carol Whitmore and Marjorie MacKay and in 2010 with Sharon Clarke, MacKay and Brenda Nearing), for curlers over 60.

== Personal life ==
Bartlett also played in four provincial softball championships. She was inducted into the Canadian Curling Hall of Fame in 1986 and the Sport NL Hall of Fame in 2003. She was employed as an insurance agent. She comes from a large family, with seven sisters and four brothers. She has three children. Her real name is "Sylvia Anne", but was called "Sue Anne" since she was a baby.
