= 1974 Macdonald Lassies Championship =

Canadian women's curling championship

- Host city: Victoria, British Columbia
- Arena: Victoria Memorial Arena
- Dates: February 24–28
- Attendance: 25,024
- Winner: Saskatchewan
- Curling club: Nutana CC, Saskatoon
- Skip: Emily Farnham
- Third: Linda Saunders
- Second: Pat McBeath
- Lead: Donna Collins

The 1974 Macdonald Lassies Championship, the Canadian women's curling championship was held February 24 to 28, 1974 at the Victoria Memorial Arena in Victoria, British Columbia. The attendance for the week was 25,024.

Team Saskatchewan, who was skipped by Emily Farnham won the event by finishing round robin play undefeated with a 9–0 record. This was Saskatchewan's sixth consecutive championship and seventh overall. This was the only national championship appearance for Farnham. The event capped a stellar season for the team, which won 120 out of 122 games, with one of their two losses coming against a men's team.

Saskatchewan's six consecutive championships set a record for the most consecutive championships by one province in either the men's and women's national championships surpassing Manitoba's five consecutive Brier championships from 1928 to 1932.

== Teams ==
The teams are listed as follows:

Alberta	British Columbia	Manitoba	New Brunswick	Newfoundland
St. Albert Ladies CC, St. Albert Skip: Marilyn Johnston; Third: Elaine Souness; Second: Irene Fielder; Lead: Marie Schultheiss	Kelowna Ladies CC, Kelowna Skip: Marion Radcliffe; Third: Karen Lovdahl; Second: Phyliss McCrady; Lead: Darlene Tucker	Portage CC, Portage la Prairie Skip: Merline Darbyshire; Third: Marjorie Marsh; Second: Pat McCaughan; Lead: Susan Dahl	Capital WC, Fredericton Skip: Dorothy Sedgewick; Third: Jean Greenbank; Second: Mary McLellan; Lead: Nancy Syroid	Carol CC, Labrador City Skip: Sue-Anne Bartlett; Third: Ann Bright; Second: Frances Hiscock; Lead: Mavis Pike
Nova Scotia	Ontario	Prince Edward Island	Quebec	Saskatchewan
Mayflower CC, Halifax Skip: Joyce Myers; Third: Sharon Horne; Second: Penny LaRocque; Lead: Vickie Noseworthy	RA Centre, Ottawa Skip: Dawn Ventura; Third: Alma Milikin; Second: Sharon Skinner; Lead: Joyce Potter	Charlottetown CC, Charlottetown Skip: Marie Toole; Third: Cathy Dillon; Second: Jeannie Boomhower; Lead: Pauline Johnston	Lachine CC, Lachine Skip: Frida Payson; Third: Margaret Wilkinson; Second: Margaret Earle; Lead: Eleanor Weldon	Nutana CC, Saskatoon Skip: Emily Farnham; Third: Linda Saunders; Second: Pat McBeath; Lead: Donna Collins

== Map of teams ==
Provincial Winners

== Round Robin Standings ==
Final round robin standings

Key
Lassies champion

Province	Skip	W	L	PF	PA
Saskatchewan	Emily Farnham	9	0	89	43
Prince Edward Island	Marie Toole	7	2	78	64
British Columbia	Marion Radcliffe	6	3	70	62
Ontario	Dawn Ventura	6	3	82	67
Newfoundland	Sue Anne Bartlett	5	4	68	69
Alberta	Marilyn Johnston	5	4	69	58
Quebec	Frida Payson	3	6	67	91
Nova Scotia	Joyce Myers	2	7	71	77
Manitoba	Merline Darbyshire	2	7	52	79
New Brunswick	Dorothy Sedgewick	0	9	56	92

== Round Robin results ==
=== Draw 1 ===
Team	1	2	3	4	5	6	7	8	9	10	Final
Saskatchewan (Farnham)	0	3	0	3	1	0	0	1	0	1	9
New Brunswick (Sedgewick)	1	0	2	0	0	1	1	0	2	0	7

Team	1	2	3	4	5	6	7	8	9	10	Final
Quebec (Payson)	0	3	0	1	0	2	0	1	0	X	7
Alberta (Johnston)	3	0	3	0	2	0	1	0	2	X	11

Team	1	2	3	4	5	6	7	8	9	10	Final
British Columbia (Radcliffe)	2	1	0	0	1	0	2	1	0	X	7
Manitoba (Darbyshire)	0	0	1	1	0	1	0	0	1	X	4

Team	1	2	3	4	5	6	7	8	9	10	Final
Prince Edward Island (Toole)	0	2	0	1	2	0	4	1	0	X	10
Newfoundland (Bartlett)	1	0	2	0	0	1	0	0	1	X	5

Team	1	2	3	4	5	6	7	8	9	10	Final
Nova Scotia (Myers)	0	0	1	0	1	0	0	1	3	X	6
Ontario (Ventura)	2	1	0	3	0	4	4	0	0	X	14

=== Draw 2 ===
Team	1	2	3	4	5	6	7	8	9	10	Final
Saskatchewan (Farnham)	2	0	6	0	1	1	1	3	X	X	14
Quebec (Payson)	0	2	0	1	0	0	0	0	X	X	3

Team	1	2	3	4	5	6	7	8	9	10	11	Final
British Columbia (Radcliffe)	3	1	0	0	1	0	0	1	0	1	0	7
Alberta (Johnston)	0	0	2	2	0	0	2	0	1	0	1	8

Team	1	2	3	4	5	6	7	8	9	10	Final
Newfoundland (Bartlett)	1	3	0	3	0	0	1	2	2	X	12
Manitoba (Darbyshire)	0	0	1	0	2	2	0	0	0	X	5

Team	1	2	3	4	5	6	7	8	9	10	Final
Prince Edward Island (Toole)	4	0	1	1	0	0	3	2	0	X	11
Nova Scotia (Myers)	0	2	0	0	2	1	0	0	3	X	8

Team	1	2	3	4	5	6	7	8	9	10	Final
New Brunswick (Sedgewick)	2	0	2	0	0	3	0	1	0	0	8
Ontario (Ventura)	0	1	0	2	1	0	2	0	2	3	11

=== Draw 3 ===
Team	1	2	3	4	5	6	7	8	9	10	Final
Saskatchewan (Farnham)	3	0	5	2	0	1	0	2	X	X	13
Newfoundland (Bartlett)	0	1	0	0	1	0	2	0	X	X	4

Team	1	2	3	4	5	6	7	8	9	10	11	Final
Prince Edward Island (Toole)	2	0	0	2	0	1	0	0	1	0	1	7
Alberta (Johnston)	0	1	1	0	1	0	1	1	0	1	0	6

Team	1	2	3	4	5	6	7	8	9	10	Final
British Columbia (Radcliffe)	3	1	0	1	2	0	0	2	0	1	10
New Brunswick (Sedgewick)	0	0	1	0	0	1	1	0	2	0	5

Team	1	2	3	4	5	6	7	8	9	10	Final
Quebec (Payson)	0	0	2	1	1	0	2	0	2	X	8
Ontario (Ventura)	4	1	0	0	0	3	0	2	0	X	10

Team	1	2	3	4	5	6	7	8	9	10	Final
Nova Scotia (Myers)	0	1	1	0	1	1	0	3	1	X	8
Manitoba (Darbyshire)	1	0	0	2	0	0	2	0	0	X	5

=== Draw 4 ===
Team	1	2	3	4	5	6	7	8	9	10	Final
British Columbia (Radcliffe)	1	2	2	0	0	0	0	0	1	2	8
Newfoundland (Bartlett)	0	0	0	1	1	1	1	1	0	0	5

Team	1	2	3	4	5	6	7	8	9	10	11	Final
Alberta (Johnston)	1	1	0	0	2	0	0	1	0	1	0	6
Ontario (Ventura)	0	0	1	1	0	1	2	0	1	0	1	7

Team	1	2	3	4	5	6	7	8	9	10	11	Final
Quebec (Payson)	0	1	0	3	0	0	0	2	1	1	0	8
Manitoba (Darbyshire)	1	0	2	0	2	1	2	0	0	0	1	9

Team	1	2	3	4	5	6	7	8	9	10	Final
Nova Scotia (Myers)	4	1	2	0	0	5	2	X	X	X	14
New Brunswick (Sedgewick)	0	0	0	1	1	0	0	X	X	X	2

Team	1	2	3	4	5	6	7	8	9	10	Final
Prince Edward Island (Toole)	0	0	1	0	2	0	1	0	0	X	4
Saskatchewan (Farnham)	2	1	0	4	0	1	0	1	1	X	10

=== Draw 5 ===
Team	1	2	3	4	5	6	7	8	9	10	Final
Alberta (Johnston)	1	1	0	3	4	0	X	X	X	X	9
Manitoba (Darbyshire)	0	0	0	0	0	1	X	X	X	X	1

Team	1	2	3	4	5	6	7	8	9	10	Final
Prince Edward Island (Toole)	2	0	3	2	0	0	2	1	1	X	11
British Columbia (Radcliffe)	0	1	0	0	1	1	0	0	0	X	3

Team	1	2	3	4	5	6	7	8	9	10	Final
Saskatchewan (Farnham)	0	0	1	0	2	1	0	2	2	X	8
Nova Scotia (Myers)	2	1	0	2	0	0	1	0	0	X	6

Team	1	2	3	4	5	6	7	8	9	10	Final
Newfoundland (Bartlett)	0	1	2	2	1	1	0	1	0	X	8
Ontario (Ventura)	2	0	0	0	0	0	1	0	1	X	4

Team	1	2	3	4	5	6	7	8	9	10	Final
Quebec (Payson)	1	0	2	2	1	1	0	0	0	2	9
New Brunswick (Sedgewick)	0	2	0	0	0	0	2	3	1	0	8

=== Draw 6 ===
Team	1	2	3	4	5	6	7	8	9	10	Final
Newfoundland (Bartlett)	2	0	2	1	0	0	1	0	1	X	7
New Brunswick (Sedgewick)	0	1	0	0	1	2	0	1	0	X	5

Team	1	2	3	4	5	6	7	8	9	10	11	Final
Prince Edward Island (Toole)	2	0	3	1	1	0	0	0	0	0	1	8
Quebec (Payson)	0	2	0	0	0	1	1	1	1	1	0	7

Team	1	2	3	4	5	6	7	8	9	10	Final
Saskatchewan (Farnham)	0	0	1	1	1	0	0	2	0	1	6
Alberta (Johnston)	2	0	0	0	0	1	0	0	2	0	5

Team	1	2	3	4	5	6	7	8	9	10	Final
Manitoba (Darbyshire)	0	0	1	0	1	1	0	1	0	X	4
Ontario (Ventura)	1	3	0	1	0	0	2	0	5	X	12

Team	1	2	3	4	5	6	7	8	9	10	11	Final
British Columbia (Radcliffe)	0	1	0	2	1	0	3	0	1	0	1	9
Nova Scotia (Myers)	1	0	1	0	0	1	0	4	0	1	0	8

=== Draw 7 ===
Team	1	2	3	4	5	6	7	8	9	10	Final
British Columbia (Radcliffe)	0	1	0	1	3	0	3	1	1	X	10
Ontario (Ventura)	4	0	2	0	0	1	0	0	0	X	7

Team	1	2	3	4	5	6	7	8	9	10	Final
Saskatchewan (Farnham)	1	0	0	3	2	0	0	1	1	X	8
Manitoba (Darbyshire)	0	1	0	0	0	2	1	0	0	X	4

Team	1	2	3	4	5	6	7	8	9	10	Final
Prince Edward Island (Toole)	0	1	2	1	1	0	4	0	1	X	10
New Brunswick (Sedgewick)	2	0	0	0	0	2	0	2	0	X	6

Team	1	2	3	4	5	6	7	8	9	10	11	Final
Quebec (Payson)	0	0	2	0	5	1	2	0	0	0	1	11
Newfoundland (Bartlett)	1	1	0	3	0	0	0	1	1	3	0	10

Team	1	2	3	4	5	6	7	8	9	10	Final
Nova Scotia (Myers)	3	0	0	0	1	0	0	2	0	0	6
Alberta (Johnston)	0	1	0	2	0	1	0	0	2	1	7

=== Draw 8 ===
Team	1	2	3	4	5	6	7	8	9	10	Final
Prince Edward Island (Toole)	1	1	0	2	0	1	0	2	0	0	7
Ontario (Ventura)	0	0	2	0	1	0	3	0	1	3	10

Team	1	2	3	4	5	6	7	8	9	10	Final
Alberta (Johnston)	0	0	2	0	2	0	1	0	1	0	6
Newfoundland (Bartlett)	1	0	0	3	0	1	0	1	0	1	7

Team	1	2	3	4	5	6	7	8	9	10	Final
Nova Scotia (Myers)	0	1	0	3	0	3	0	0	1	X	8
Quebec (Payson)	4	0	1	0	2	0	3	1	0	X	11

Team	1	2	3	4	5	6	7	8	9	10	Final
Saskatchewan (Farnham)	1	2	1	0	0	2	3	2	X	X	11
British Columbia (Radcliffe)	0	0	0	2	1	0	0	0	X	X	3

Team	1	2	3	4	5	6	7	8	9	10	Final
New Brunswick (Sedgewick)	0	1	0	2	0	1	0	1	X	X	5
Manitoba (Darbyshire)	2	0	2	0	4	0	3	0	X	X	11

=== Draw 9 ===
Team	1	2	3	4	5	6	7	8	9	10	Final
British Columbia (Radcliffe)	3	1	3	1	1	0	2	2	X	X	13
Quebec (Payson)	0	0	0	0	0	3	0	0	X	X	3

Team	1	2	3	4	5	6	7	8	9	10	Final
Saskatchewan (Farnham)	1	3	0	1	0	0	2	3	0	X	10
Ontario (Ventura)	0	0	3	0	1	1	0	0	2	X	7

Team	1	2	3	4	5	6	7	8	9	10	Final
Nova Scotia (Myers)	1	1	0	0	1	0	4	0	0	X	7
Newfoundland (Bartlett)	0	0	4	1	0	1	0	2	2	X	10

Team	1	2	3	4	5	6	7	8	9	10	Final
Prince Edward Island (Toole)	3	0	1	0	2	0	2	0	2	0	10
Manitoba (Darbyshire)	0	2	0	2	0	1	0	1	0	3	9

Team	1	2	3	4	5	6	7	8	9	10	Final
Alberta (Johnston)	0	0	4	1	0	0	0	5	0	1	11
New Brunswick (Sedgewick)	1	3	0	0	1	1	1	0	3	0	10
