= 1996 Canadian Senior Curling Championships =

The 1996 CIBC Canadian Senior Curling Championships were held January 20 to 27, 1996 in Medicine Hat, Alberta.

On the men's side, Team Ontario, skipped by Bob Turcotte won his first of three Senior titles, the seventh men's championship for Ontario. The women's side was also won by Ontario, skipped by Jill Greenwood who won her third of four national Senior championships, the fourth for Ontario.

== Men's ==
=== Teams ===
Province / Territory	Skip	Third	Second	Lead
Alberta	Harold Breckenridge	Jim McDonald	Dennis Balderston	Bill Vermette
New Brunswick	David Sullivan	Wally Nason	Rolly Lord	Bill Ayer
Manitoba	Orest Meleschuk	David Romano	John Hanesiak	Del Stitt
Northwest Territories/Yukon	Henry Lefebvre	Ron Cook	Harry Lawrence	Rodney Johnson
Saskatchewan	Al Kehler	Greg Manwaring	Lorne Leader	Robi Ford
Northern Ontario	Bill Johnston	Gord McKnight	Reginald Gardner	Terry Thib
Ontario	Bob Turcotte	Roy Weigand	Bob Lichti	Stephen McDermot
Nova Scotia	Barry Shearer	John Rowe	Colin MacLeod	John Balan
Newfoundland	Dennis Byrne	Fred Stagg	Cyril Alexander	Gerry Boland
Quebec	Wayne Byers	Brian Hiller	Phillip Knox	Norm Danylo
British Columbia	Ed Dezura	Milt Sinclair	Lorne Schwindt	Howard Grisack
Prince Edward Island	Lorn Burke	Ernie Diamond	Philip Perry	Myron MacKay

=== Standings ===
Locale	Skip	W	L
Northern Ontario	Bill Johnston	10	1
Ontario	Bob Turcotte	9	2
Saskatchewan	Al Kehler	8	3
Newfoundland	Dennis Byrne	7	4
Alberta	Harold Breckenridge	7	4
Manitoba	Orest Meleschuk	7	4
British Columbia	Ed Dezura	6	5
Nova Scotia	Barry Shearer	5	6
New Brunswick	David Sullivan	3	8
Quebec	Wayne Byers	2	9
Northwest Territories/Yukon	Henry Lefebvre	2	9
Prince Edward Island	Lorn Burke	0	11

=== Results ===
==== Draw 1 ====
Sheet B	1	2	3	4	5	6	7	8	9	10	Final
Saskatchewan (Kehler) 🔨	0	0	1	0	0	1	4	0	1	X	7
Quebec (Byers)	0	0	0	0	1	0	0	2	0	X	3

Sheet D	1	2	3	4	5	6	7	8	9	10	Final
Northwest Territories/Yukon (Lefebvre) 🔨	1	0	1	0	2	1	0	0	0	X	5
British Columbia (Dezura)	0	2	0	2	0	0	2	2	0	X	8

Sheet F	1	2	3	4	5	6	7	8	9	10	Final
Nova Scotia (Shearer) 🔨	0	1	0	2	0	0	0	1	X	X	4
Alberta (Breckenridge)	1	0	2	0	3	1	3	0	X	X	10

Sheet H	1	2	3	4	5	6	7	8	9	10	Final
Manitoba (Meleschuk) 🔨	2	0	0	1	0	3	4	0	X	X	10
Prince Edward Island (Burke)	0	0	0	0	1	0	0	0	X	X	1

==== Draw 2 ====
Sheet A	1	2	3	4	5	6	7	8	9	10	Final
Prince Edward Island (Burke) 🔨	1	0	0	2	0	0	1	0	1	0	5
New Brunswick (Sullivan)	0	0	2	0	0	2	0	1	0	1	6

Sheet C	1	2	3	4	5	6	7	8	9	10	Final
Ontario (Turcotte) 🔨	0	1	0	0	0	0	0	0	1	0	2
Northern Ontario (Johnston)	0	0	0	0	2	0	0	1	0	1	4

Sheet E	1	2	3	4	5	6	7	8	9	10	11	Final
Manitoba (Meleschuk) 🔨	1	0	0	1	0	0	2	0	0	1	0	5
Newfoundland (Byrne)	0	0	1	0	2	0	0	1	1	0	1	6

Sheet G	1	2	3	4	5	6	7	8	9	10	Final
Quebec (Byers) 🔨	1	0	0	1	0	1	0	0	0	X	3
British Columbia (Dezura)	0	1	2	0	2	0	0	0	0	X	5

==== Draw 3 ====
Sheet D	1	2	3	4	5	6	7	8	9	10	Final
Nova Scotia (Shearer) 🔨	1	0	0	1	0	1	3	0	0	X	6
Quebec (Byers)	0	2	0	0	1	0	0	1	0	X	4

Sheet F	1	2	3	4	5	6	7	8	9	10	Final
Newfoundland (Byrne) 🔨	2	1	3	0	0	1	1	0	0	X	8
New Brunswick (Sullivan)	0	0	0	1	1	0	0	1	1	X	4

==== Draw 4 ====
Sheet A	1	2	3	4	5	6	7	8	9	10	Final
Ontario (Turcotte) 🔨	2	2	1	0	1	0	1	3	X	X	10
Nova Scotia (Shearer)	0	0	0	1	0	1	0	0	X	X	2

Sheet C	1	2	3	4	5	6	7	8	9	10	11	Final
British Columbia (Dezura) 🔨	0	2	0	1	0	2	0	3	0	0	1	9
Newfoundland (Byrne)	1	0	2	0	1	0	2	0	1	1	0	8

Sheet E	1	2	3	4	5	6	7	8	9	10	Final
Saskatchewan (Kehler) 🔨	3	0	0	0	1	1	0	0	0	X	5
Northwest Territories/Yukon (Lefebvre)	0	0	0	0	0	0	1	0	0	X	1

Sheet G	1	2	3	4	5	6	7	8	9	10	Final
Northern Ontario (Johnston) 🔨	2	0	0	1	0	2	0	2	0	1	8
Alberta (Breckenridge)	0	0	1	0	2	0	3	0	1	0	7

==== Draw 5 ====
Sheet B	1	2	3	4	5	6	7	8	9	10	Final
New Brunswick (Sullivan) 🔨	0	2	0	0	1	0	2	0	0	X	5
Northern Ontario (Johnston)	1	0	1	3	0	3	0	1	1	X	10

Sheet D	1	2	3	4	5	6	7	8	9	10	Final
Prince Edward Island (Burke) 🔨	0	2	0	0	1	0	0	0	0	X	3
Ontario (Turcotte)	0	0	2	1	0	1	0	2	2	X	8

Sheet F	1	2	3	4	5	6	7	8	9	10	Final
Alberta (Breckenridge) 🔨	1	0	0	2	0	0	1	0	2	1	7
Saskatchewan (Kehler)	0	2	0	0	1	1	0	2	0	0	6

Sheet H	1	2	3	4	5	6	7	8	9	10	Final
Northwest Territories/Yukon (Lefebvre) 🔨	1	0	0	1	0	0	0	0	1	0	3
Manitoba (Meleschuk)	0	0	0	0	1	0	3	0	0	1	5

==== Draw 6 ====
Sheet A	1	2	3	4	5	6	7	8	9	10	Final
Alberta (Breckenridge) 🔨	1	0	0	2	1	1	0	0	2	X	7
Northwest Territories/Yukon (Lefebvre)	0	1	1	0	0	0	1	0	0	X	3

Sheet C	1	2	3	4	5	6	7	8	9	10	Final
Prince Edward Island (Burke) 🔨	0	0	0	0	0	0	3	0	1	X	4
Nova Scotia (Shearer)	0	0	0	3	0	2	0	2	0	X	7

Sheet E	1	2	3	4	5	6	7	8	9	10	Final
Northern Ontario (Johnston) 🔨	1	1	0	0	1	0	0	1	1	1	6
Saskatchewan (Kehler)	0	0	1	2	0	2	2	0	0	0	7

Sheet G	1	2	3	4	5	6	7	8	9	10	Final
Manitoba (Meleschuk) 🔨	1	0	1	0	1	0	3	0	3	X	9
Ontario (Turcotte)	0	2	0	2	0	1	0	1	0	X	6

==== Draw 7 ====
Sheet B	1	2	3	4	5	6	7	8	9	10	Final
Newfoundland (Byrne) 🔨	1	0	0	1	0	2	0	0	2	0	6
Northern Ontario (Johnston)	0	1	1	0	2	0	2	0	0	1	7

Sheet D	1	2	3	4	5	6	7	8	9	10	Final
Saskatchewan (Kehler) 🔨	1	0	1	0	1	0	2	0	1	0	6
Manitoba (Meleschuk)	0	2	0	2	0	1	0	2	0	1	8

Sheet F	1	2	3	4	5	6	7	8	9	10	Final
Ontario (Turcotte) 🔨	0	3	0	2	2	0	0	0	1	X	8
Quebec (Byers)	0	0	1	0	0	0	1	1	0	X	3

Sheet H	1	2	3	4	5	6	7	8	9	10	Final
British Columbia (Dezura) 🔨	2	0	3	3	0	0	0	1	X	X	9
New Brunswick (Sullivan)	0	1	0	0	0	0	1	0	X	X	2

==== Draw 8 ====
Sheet A	1	2	3	4	5	6	7	8	9	10	Final
Quebec (Byers) 🔨	0	1	0	0	2	0	0	1	0	X	4
Newfoundland (Byrne)	1	0	0	2	0	0	2	0	3	X	8

Sheet C	1	2	3	4	5	6	7	8	9	10	Final
New Brunswick (Sullivan) 🔨	0	1	0	1	0	0	1	0	0	X	3
Alberta (Breckenridge)	0	0	2	0	3	0	0	2	1	X	8

Sheet E	1	2	3	4	5	6	7	8	9	10	Final
Northwest Territories/Yukon (Lefebvre) 🔨	0	2	0	1	0	1	0	0	0	1	5
Prince Edward Island (Burke)	1	0	1	0	1	0	0	1	0	0	4

Sheet G	1	2	3	4	5	6	7	8	9	10	11	Final
Nova Scotia (Shearer) 🔨	1	0	0	1	0	1	2	0	1	0	1	7
British Columbia (Dezura)	0	0	2	0	1	0	0	1	0	2	0	6

==== Draw 9 ====
Sheet B	1	2	3	4	5	6	7	8	9	10	11	Final
Alberta (Breckenridge) 🔨	2	0	1	0	1	0	1	0	2	0	1	8
Manitoba (Meleschuk)	0	2	0	1	0	1	0	1	0	2	0	7

Sheet D	1	2	3	4	5	6	7	8	9	10	Final
New Brunswick (Sullivan) 🔨	1	0	0	0	1	0	0	1	0	X	3
Saskatchewan (Kehler)	0	0	0	1	0	3	2	0	1	X	7

Sheet F	1	2	3	4	5	6	7	8	9	10	Final
Northern Ontario (Johnston) 🔨	0	0	0	0	2	0	1	0	X	X	3
Northwest Territories/Yukon (Lefebvre)	0	0	0	0	0	1	0	1	X	X	2

Sheet H	1	2	3	4	5	6	7	8	9	10	11	Final
Ontario (Turcotte) 🔨	0	1	0	2	2	0	1	0	0	0	1	7
British Columbia (Dezura)	1	0	2	0	0	1	0	1	0	1	0	6

==== Draw 10 ====
Sheet A	1	2	3	4	5	6	7	8	9	10	Final
Newfoundland (Byrne) 🔨	0	1	0	2	1	0	0	1	0	1	6
Alberta (Breckenridge)	0	0	1	0	0	2	0	0	2	0	5

Sheet C	1	2	3	4	5	6	7	8	9	10	Final
Quebec (Byers) 🔨	2	0	0	1	0	0	1	0	1	0	5
New Brunswick (Sullivan)	0	0	1	0	2	0	0	2	0	1	6

Sheet E	1	2	3	4	5	6	7	8	9	10	Final
Manitoba (Meleschuk) 🔨	2	0	1	0	2	0	1	0	2	X	8
Nova Scotia (Shearer)	0	1	0	1	0	2	0	2	0	X	6

Sheet G	1	2	3	4	5	6	7	8	9	10	Final
Saskatchewan (Kehler) 🔨	0	1	1	0	0	0	1	0	0	1	4
Prince Edward Island (Burke)	0	0	0	1	0	0	0	1	0	0	2

==== Draw 11 ====
Sheet B	1	2	3	4	5	6	7	8	9	10	Final
Northwest Territories/Yukon (Lefebvre) 🔨	0	2	0	1	0	1	0	1	0	0	5
Ontario (Turcotte)	1	0	3	0	2	0	0	0	0	1	7

Sheet D	1	2	3	4	5	6	7	8	9	10	Final
Nova Scotia (Shearer) 🔨	0	0	0	0	1	0	0	0	X	X	1
Newfoundland (Byrne)	0	4	0	1	0	0	3	3	X	X	11

Sheet F	1	2	3	4	5	6	7	8	9	10	Final
British Columbia (Dezura) 🔨	1	0	2	0	0	0	0	0	1	0	4
Northern Ontario (Johnston)	0	1	0	3	0	0	1	1	0	1	7

Sheet H	1	2	3	4	5	6	7	8	9	10	Final
Prince Edward Island (Burke) 🔨	0	1	0	1	0	0	0	1	0	X	3
Quebec (Byers)	2	0	1	0	0	1	0	0	0	X	4

==== Draw 12 ====
Sheet A	1	2	3	4	5	6	7	8	9	10	Final
Prince Edward Island (Burke) 🔨	1	0	0	0	0	X	X	X	X	X	1
British Columbia (Dezura)	0	3	0	2	1	X	X	X	X	X	6

Sheet C	1	2	3	4	5	6	7	8	9	10	Final
Manitoba (Meleschuk) 🔨	1	3	0	1	0	3	0	2	X	X	10
Quebec (Byers)	0	0	2	0	1	0	2	0	X	X	5

Sheet E	1	2	3	4	5	6	7	8	9	10	Final
Ontario (Turcotte) 🔨	2	0	2	0	3	2	X	X	X	X	9
Newfoundland (Byrne)	0	1	0	1	0	0	X	X	X	X	2

Sheet G	1	2	3	4	5	6	7	8	9	10	Final
New Brunswick (Sullivan) 🔨	2	0	1	0	0	0	2	0	0	X	5
Northwest Territories/Yukon (Lefebvre)	0	1	0	0	1	2	0	2	1	X	7

==== Draw 13 ====
Sheet B	1	2	3	4	5	6	7	8	9	10	Final
Saskatchewan (Kehler) 🔨	0	0	0	1	0	2	1	1	0	0	5
Ontario (Turcotte)	0	0	1	0	2	0	0	0	2	1	6

Sheet D	1	2	3	4	5	6	7	8	9	10	Final
Quebec (Byers) 🔨	0	0	2	0	0	1	0	1	X	X	4
Northern Ontario (Johnston)	2	1	0	5	2	0	2	0	X	X	12

Sheet F	1	2	3	4	5	6	7	8	9	10	Final
Northwest Territories/Yukon (Lefebvre) 🔨	0	1	0	0	0	1	0	0	0	0	2
Nova Scotia (Shearer)	0	0	0	2	0	0	0	1	0	1	4

Sheet H	1	2	3	4	5	6	7	8	9	10	Final
Alberta (Breckenridge) 🔨	1	2	0	3	0	0	2	1	X	X	9
Prince Edward Island (Burke)	0	0	1	0	2	0	0	0	X	X	3

==== Draw 14 ====
Sheet A	1	2	3	4	5	6	7	8	9	10	11	Final
Nova Scotia (Shearer) 🔨	2	0	2	0	2	0	1	0	0	0	1	8
New Brunswick (Sullivan)	0	1	0	1	0	2	0	0	1	2	0	7

Sheet C	1	2	3	4	5	6	7	8	9	10	Final
Newfoundland (Byrne) 🔨	1	0	1	0	1	0	0	0	0	X	3
Saskatchewan (Kehler)	0	2	0	3	0	0	1	1	1	X	8

Sheet E	1	2	3	4	5	6	7	8	9	10	Final
British Columbia (Dezura) 🔨	1	0	0	2	0	1	2	0	0	2	8
Alberta (Breckenridge)	0	1	0	0	3	0	0	1	1	0	6

Sheet G	1	2	3	4	5	6	7	8	9	10	Final
Northern Ontario (Johnston) 🔨	0	1	1	0	0	2	0	1	0	1	6
Manitoba (Meleschuk)	1	0	0	1	0	0	1	0	2	0	5

==== Draw 15 ====
Sheet B	1	2	3	4	5	6	7	8	9	10	11	Final
Quebec (Byers) 🔨	1	0	0	0	1	0	2	0	0	1	0	5
Alberta (Breckenridge)	0	1	0	1	0	1	0	1	1	0	2	7

Sheet D	1	2	3	4	5	6	7	8	9	10	11	Final
British Columbia (Dezura) 🔨	1	0	1	0	2	0	1	0	0	1	0	6
Saskatchewan (Kehler)	0	1	0	1	0	2	0	1	1	0	1	7

Sheet F	1	2	3	4	5	6	7	8	9	10	11	Final
Prince Edward Island (Burke) 🔨	1	0	0	1	0	1	0	1	1	1	0	6
Newfoundland (Byrne)	0	2	0	0	1	0	3	0	0	0	1	7

Sheet H	1	2	3	4	5	6	7	8	9	10	Final
Nova Scotia (Shearer) 🔨	1	0	0	0	0	1	0	0	0	X	2
Northern Ontario (Johnston)	0	0	0	1	1	0	2	2	1	X	7

==== Draw 16 ====
Sheet A	1	2	3	4	5	6	7	8	9	10	Final
Manitoba (Meleschuk) 🔨	1	0	0	0	1	1	0	2	0	X	5
British Columbia (Dezura)	0	1	0	1	0	0	1	0	1	X	4

Sheet C	1	2	3	4	5	6	7	8	9	10	Final
Northern Ontario (Johnston) 🔨	2	0	0	3	0	0	0	1	1	X	7
Prince Edward Island (Burke)	0	2	1	0	0	1	0	0	0	X	4

Sheet E	1	2	3	4	5	6	7	8	9	10	Final
Ontario (Turcotte) 🔨	0	1	0	1	0	1	0	1	0	X	4
New Brunswick (Sullivan)	0	0	1	0	0	0	1	0	0	X	2

Sheet G	1	2	3	4	5	6	7	8	9	10	Final
Newfoundland (Byrne) 🔨	0	2	1	1	1	0	0	2	3	X	10
Northwest Territories/Yukon (Lefebvre)	1	0	0	0	0	1	0	0	0	X	2

==== Draw 17 ====
Sheet B	1	2	3	4	5	6	7	8	9	10	Final
Northwest Territories/Yukon (Lefebvre) 🔨	1	0	0	0	0	0	0	1	0	X	2
Quebec (Byers)	0	0	1	0	2	1	1	0	1	X	6

Sheet D	1	2	3	4	5	6	7	8	9	10	Final
Alberta (Breckenridge) 🔨	0	1	0	0	0	1	0	3	0	0	5
Ontario (Turcotte)	0	0	0	0	3	0	2	0	0	1	6

Sheet F	1	2	3	4	5	6	7	8	9	10	Final
New Brunswick (Sullivan) 🔨	1	0	1	0	0	1	0	0	1	1	5
Manitoba (Meleschuk)	0	1	0	1	1	0	0	1	0	0	4

Sheet H	1	2	3	4	5	6	7	8	9	10	Final
Saskatchewan (Kehler) 🔨	1	1	0	4	0	0	1	0	2	X	9
Nova Scotia (Shearer)	0	0	1	0	1	1	0	1	0	X	4

=== Playoffs ===
Semifinal		Final
Ontario	8
Saskatchewan	7	Northern Ontario	6
		Ontario	10

==== Semifinal ====
Sheet E	1	2	3	4	5	6	7	8	9	10	Final
Ontario (Turcotte) 🔨	2	0	3	0	0	2	0	0	0	1	8
Saskatchewan (Kehler)	0	1	0	1	1	0	0	4	0	0	7

Player percentages
Ontario		Saskatchewan	
Stephen McDermot	97%	Robi Ford	95%
Bob Lichti	79%	Lorne Leader	90%
Roy Weigand	85%	Greg Manwaring	89%
Bob Turcotte	84%	Al Kehler	80%
Total	86%	Total	89%

==== Final ====
Sheet F	1	2	3	4	5	6	7	8	9	10	11	Final
Northern Ontario (Johnston) 🔨	1	0	1	0	0	2	0	1	1	0	0	6
Ontario (Turcotte)	0	0	0	1	1	0	2	0	0	2	4	10

Player percentages
Northern Ontario		Ontario	
Terry Thib	69%	Stephen McDermot	93%
Reginald Gardner	77%	Bob Lichti	76%
Gord McKnight	85%	Roy Weigand	72%
Bill Johnston	70%	Bob Turcotte	82%
Total	76%	Total	81%

== Women's ==
=== Teams ===
Province / Territory	Skip	Third	Second	Lead
Alberta	Sandy Turner	Arlene Sali	Marilyn Toews	Darlene Breckenridge
New Brunswick	Marlene Vaughan	Ellen Brennan	Rose Donovan	Marlene McLenaghan
Manitoba	Edith Carter	Cheryl McDougall	Margaret Streich	Louise Goodbrandson
Yukon/Northwest Territories	Norma Burrell	Elaine Gee	Vimy Cooper	Peggy Duncan
Saskatchewan	Sheila Rowan	Lee Morrison	Jean MacLean	Carol Jorgenson
Northern Ontario	Joan Broughton	Pat Dayes	Doreen McLuhan	Jean Parker
Ontario	Jill Greenwood	Yvonne Smith	Gloria Campbell	Vicki Lauder
Nova Scotia	Penny LaRocque	Sharon Horne	Margaret Cameron	Ann Donaldson
Newfoundland	Sue Anne Bartlett	Ruby Crocker	Betty McLean	Gertrude Peck
Quebec	Agnes Charette	Martha Don	Lois Baines	Joan MacCallum
British Columbia	Jeanette Sillars	Betty Rieder	Beryl Cook	Maureen Anderson
Prince Edward Island	Gen Enman	Wanda MacLean	Marilyn Banks	Janet Phillips

=== Standings ===
Locale	Skip	W	L
Ontario	Jill Greenwood	9	2
British Columbia	Jeanette Sillars	8	3
Alberta	Sandy Turner	8	3
Nova Scotia	Penny LaRocque	7	4
Saskatchewan	Sheila Rowan	7	4
Quebec	Agnes Charette	7	4
Manitoba	Edith Carter	5	6
New Brunswick	Marlene Vaughan	5	6
Newfoundland	Sue Anne Bartlett	5	6
Northern Ontario	Joan Broughton	3	8
Prince Edward Island	Gen Enman	1	10
Yukon/Northwest Territories	Norma Burrell	1	10

=== Results ===
==== Draw 1 ====
Sheet A	1	2	3	4	5	6	7	8	9	10	Final
Prince Edward Island (Enman) 🔨	0	0	0	0	1	1	0	0	X	X	2
Manitoba (Carter)	3	2	1	2	0	0	4	1	X	X	13

Sheet C	1	2	3	4	5	6	7	8	9	10	Final
Alberta (Turner) 🔨	1	1	2	1	0	1	1	0	0	1	8
New Brunswick (Vaughan)	0	0	0	0	1	0	0	2	1	0	4

Sheet E	1	2	3	4	5	6	7	8	9	10	Final
British Columbia (Sillars) 🔨	4	0	2	0	3	1	3	X	X	X	13
Yukon/Northwest Territories (Burrell)	0	1	0	1	0	0	0	X	X	X	2

Sheet G	1	2	3	4	5	6	7	8	9	10	Final
Quebec (Charette) 🔨	0	1	0	1	0	1	0	2	0	X	5
Saskatchewan (Rowan)	1	0	3	0	1	0	3	0	1	X	9

==== Draw 2 ====
Sheet B	1	2	3	4	5	6	7	8	9	10	Final
Saskatchewan (Rowan) 🔨	1	3	0	0	1	2	0	3	X	X	10
Yukon/Northwest Territories (Burrell)	0	0	2	1	0	0	1	0	X	X	4

Sheet D	1	2	3	4	5	6	7	8	9	10	Final
Prince Edward Island (Enman) 🔨	0	0	0	3	0	1	0	1	0	X	5
Nova Scotia (LaRocque)	1	2	1	0	4	0	1	0	2	X	11

Sheet F	1	2	3	4	5	6	7	8	9	10	Final
Newfoundland (Bartlett) 🔨	1	0	0	3	1	0	0	2	0	0	7
Northern Ontario (Broughton)	0	1	0	0	0	0	3	0	2	0	6

Sheet H	1	2	3	4	5	6	7	8	9	10	Final
Manitoba (Carter) 🔨	0	1	0	0	0	2	0	0	X	X	3
Ontario (Greenwood)	2	0	1	4	1	0	2	1	X	X	11

==== Draw 3 ====
Sheet C	1	2	3	4	5	6	7	8	9	10	Final
Nova Scotia (LaRocque) 🔨	0	2	0	2	0	2	0	1	0	0	7
Ontario (Greenwood)	2	0	2	0	2	0	2	0	1	1	10

Sheet E	1	2	3	4	5	6	7	8	9	10	Final
Alberta (Turner) 🔨	1	0	0	1	1	0	0	2	0	2	7
Saskatchewan (Rowan)	0	0	1	0	0	3	1	0	1	0	6

==== Draw 4 ====
Sheet B	1	2	3	4	5	6	7	8	9	10	Final
Northern Ontario (Broughton) 🔨	2	0	0	0	2	0	0	1	0	0	5
New Brunswick (Vaughan)	0	2	1	1	0	2	1	0	1	1	9

Sheet D	1	2	3	4	5	6	7	8	9	10	Final
Quebec (Charette) 🔨	4	0	0	2	0	1	0	1	0	X	8
British Columbia (Sillars)	0	2	1	0	1	0	1	0	1	X	6

Sheet F	1	2	3	4	5	6	7	8	9	10	Final
Yukon/Northwest Territories (Burrell) 🔨	0	0	0	0	2	0	X	X	X	X	2
Nova Scotia (LaRocque)	6	0	1	1	0	3	X	X	X	X	11

Sheet H	1	2	3	4	5	6	7	8	9	10	Final
Newfoundland (Bartlett) 🔨	0	0	1	0	0	1	0	1	0	X	3
Alberta (Turner)	1	0	0	1	1	0	1	0	2	X	6

==== Draw 5 ====
Sheet A	1	2	3	4	5	6	7	8	9	10	Final
British Columbia (Sillars) 🔨	0	0	0	2	2	3	1	0	0	X	8
Prince Edward Island (Enman)	1	0	1	0	0	0	0	1	1	X	4

Sheet C	1	2	3	4	5	6	7	8	9	10	Final
New Brunswick (Vaughan) 🔨	2	1	0	1	0	1	0	3	0	1	9
Quebec (Charette)	0	0	2	0	1	0	3	0	2	0	8

Sheet E	1	2	3	4	5	6	7	8	9	10	Final
Manitoba (Carter) 🔨	2	0	2	1	1	0	4	0	2	X	12
Newfoundland (Bartlett)	0	1	0	0	0	2	0	2	0	X	5

Sheet G	1	2	3	4	5	6	7	8	9	10	Final
Ontario (Greenwood) 🔨	0	1	3	1	0	6	0	1	X	X	12
Northern Ontario (Broughton)	1	0	0	0	2	0	2	0	X	X	5

==== Draw 6 ====
Sheet B	1	2	3	4	5	6	7	8	9	10	Final
Prince Edward Island (Enman) 🔨	0	0	2	0	0	1	2	0	0	X	5
Newfoundland (Bartlett)	2	2	0	1	2	0	0	1	3	X	11

Sheet D	1	2	3	4	5	6	7	8	9	10	Final
Northern Ontario (Broughton) 🔨	3	0	2	1	0	2	0	0	0	X	8
Quebec (Charette)	0	1	0	0	1	0	2	1	1	X	6

Sheet F	1	2	3	4	5	6	7	8	9	10	Final
Manitoba (Carter) 🔨	1	0	2	0	0	0	0	1	0	X	4
Alberta (Turner)	0	1	0	0	2	0	1	0	3	X	7

Sheet H	1	2	3	4	5	6	7	8	9	10	Final
New Brunswick (Vaughan) 🔨	0	0	1	0	1	0	1	0	1	0	4
British Columbia (Sillars)	0	1	0	1	0	0	0	1	0	2	5

==== Draw 7 ====
Sheet A	1	2	3	4	5	6	7	8	9	10	Final
Yukon/Northwest Territories (Burrell) 🔨	1	1	0	0	0	0	1	1	0	X	4
Ontario (Greenwood)	0	0	5	1	2	1	0	0	3	X	12

Sheet C	1	2	3	4	5	6	7	8	9	10	Final
Newfoundland (Bartlett) 🔨	1	1	1	0	2	0	0	0	1	3	9
Saskatchewan (Rowan)	0	0	0	2	0	1	0	1	0	0	4

Sheet E	1	2	3	4	5	6	7	8	9	10	Final
Quebec (Charette) 🔨	0	1	0	1	0	3	0	0	0	4	9
Prince Edward Island (Enman)	1	0	1	0	1	0	1	2	1	0	7

Sheet G	1	2	3	4	5	6	7	8	9	10	Final
Nova Scotia (LaRocque) 🔨	3	0	2	1	3	0	1	0	X	X	10
Northern Ontario (Broughton)	0	1	0	0	0	2	0	1	X	X	4

==== Draw 8 ====
Sheet B	1	2	3	4	5	6	7	8	9	10	Final
Alberta (Turner) 🔨	2	3	5	2	1	X	X	X	X	X	13
Yukon/Northwest Territories (Burrell)	0	0	0	0	0	X	X	X	X	X	0

Sheet D	1	2	3	4	5	6	7	8	9	10	Final
British Columbia (Sillars) 🔨	1	0	0	4	2	0	0	2	0	X	9
Manitoba (Carter)	0	2	1	0	0	1	1	0	1	X	6

Sheet F	1	2	3	4	5	6	7	8	9	10	Final
Ontario (Greenwood) 🔨	1	0	0	0	2	0	1	0	0	X	4
New Brunswick (Vaughan)	0	1	0	0	0	1	0	0	1	X	3

Sheet H	1	2	3	4	5	6	7	8	9	10	Final
Saskatchewan (Rowan) 🔨	0	1	0	0	0	1	0	0	0	X	2
Nova Scotia (LaRocque)	0	0	2	0	1	0	1	1	2	X	7

==== Draw 9 ====
Sheet A	1	2	3	4	5	6	7	8	9	10	Final
Newfoundland (Bartlett) 🔨	0	2	1	0	1	2	0	1	0	X	7
Yukon/Northwest Territories (Burrell)	0	0	0	1	0	0	1	0	1	X	3

Sheet C	1	2	3	4	5	6	7	8	9	10	Final
Northern Ontario (Broughton) 🔨	0	0	0	1	2	0	0	3	0	X	6
British Columbia (Sillars)	1	2	0	0	0	1	0	0	4	X	8

Sheet E	1	2	3	4	5	6	7	8	9	10	Final
Ontario (Greenwood) 🔨	1	0	2	0	2	0	0	3	2	X	10
Quebec (Charette)	0	2	0	1	0	2	0	0	0	X	5

Sheet G	1	2	3	4	5	6	7	8	9	10	Final
New Brunswick (Vaughan) 🔨	3	0	2	1	2	0	5	X	X	X	13
Prince Edward Island (Enman)	0	1	0	0	0	2	0	X	X	X	3

==== Draw 10 ====
Sheet B	1	2	3	4	5	6	7	8	9	10	11	Final
Quebec (Charette) 🔨	2	0	3	0	1	0	1	0	1	0	1	9
Manitoba (Carter)	0	1	0	1	0	1	0	2	0	3	0	8

Sheet D	1	2	3	4	5	6	7	8	9	10	Final
Prince Edward Island (Enman) 🔨	3	0	2	0	2	1	0	0	2	X	10
Alberta (Turner)	0	3	0	1	0	0	2	6	0	X	12

Sheet F	1	2	3	4	5	6	7	8	9	10	Final
Saskatchewan (Rowan) 🔨	1	0	1	0	1	0	2	0	1	3	9
Ontario (Greenwood)	0	1	0	2	0	2	0	2	0	0	7

Sheet H	1	2	3	4	5	6	7	8	9	10	Final
Nova Scotia (LaRocque) 🔨	0	1	0	1	0	0	0	X	X	X	2
New Brunswick (Vaughan)	0	0	3	0	3	2	2	X	X	X	10

==== Draw 11 ====
Sheet A	1	2	3	4	5	6	7	8	9	10	Final
Manitoba (Carter) 🔨	2	0	0	1	0	0	1	1	0	1	6
Saskatchewan (Rowan)	0	1	0	0	2	1	0	0	3	0	7

Sheet C	1	2	3	4	5	6	7	8	9	10	Final
Yukon/Northwest Territories (Burrell) 🔨	1	1	0	1	0	0	0	0	0	X	3
Northern Ontario (Broughton)	0	0	3	0	1	1	1	1	1	X	8

Sheet E	1	2	3	4	5	6	7	8	9	10	Final
Alberta (Turner) 🔨	1	0	2	0	1	0	3	0	0	1	8
Nova Scotia (LaRocque)	0	1	0	1	0	1	0	1	1	0	5

Sheet G	1	2	3	4	5	6	7	8	9	10	Final
British Columbia (Sillars) 🔨	0	0	0	0	0	1	2	0	0	X	3
Newfoundland (Bartlett)	0	1	0	1	1	0	0	3	1	X	7

==== Draw 12 ====
Sheet B	1	2	3	4	5	6	7	8	9	10	Final
Ontario (Greenwood) 🔨	3	0	0	1	0	0	1	0	1	0	6
British Columbia (Sillars)	0	1	3	0	0	0	0	2	0	1	7

Sheet D	1	2	3	4	5	6	7	8	9	10	Final
Newfoundland (Bartlett) 🔨	1	0	2	0	1	0	0	1	0	X	5
Nova Scotia (LaRocque)	0	2	0	2	0	1	2	0	3	X	10

Sheet F	1	2	3	4	5	6	7	8	9	10	Final
Prince Edward Island (Enman) 🔨	0	2	0	0	1	0	1	1	X	X	5
Saskatchewan (Rowan)	4	0	4	1	0	2	0	0	X	X	11

Sheet H	1	2	3	4	5	6	7	8	9	10	Final
Manitoba (Carter) 🔨	1	2	0	4	1	0	2	0	X	X	10
Yukon/Northwest Territories (Burrell)	0	0	1	0	0	1	0	1	X	X	3

==== Draw 13 ====
Sheet A	1	2	3	4	5	6	7	8	9	10	11	Final
New Brunswick (Vaughan) 🔨	0	0	1	0	1	2	0	0	1	0	0	5
Manitoba (Carter)	0	1	0	1	0	0	1	1	0	1	1	6

Sheet C	1	2	3	4	5	6	7	8	9	10	Final
British Columbia (Sillars) 🔨	2	1	0	1	0	2	0	2	0	1	9
Alberta (Turner)	0	0	3	0	2	0	2	0	0	0	7

Sheet E	1	2	3	4	5	6	7	8	9	10	Final
Saskatchewan (Rowan) 🔨	3	0	0	2	0	0	3	0	3	X	11
Northern Ontario (Broughton)	0	2	1	0	1	0	0	2	0	X	6

Sheet G	1	2	3	4	5	6	7	8	9	10	Final
Quebec (Charette) 🔨	1	0	2	2	0	1	0	0	2	X	8
Newfoundland (Bartlett)	0	1	0	0	2	0	2	1	0	X	6

==== Draw 14 ====
Sheet B	1	2	3	4	5	6	7	8	9	10	Final
Northern Ontario (Broughton) 🔨	1	0	0	3	1	0	1	1	2	X	9
Prince Edward Island (Enman)	0	1	3	0	0	1	0	0	0	X	5

Sheet D	1	2	3	4	5	6	7	8	9	10	Final
Yukon/Northwest Territories (Burrell) 🔨	0	0	4	0	0	0	0	0	2	X	6
New Brunswick (Vaughan)	0	0	0	1	1	0	1	1	0	X	4

Sheet F	1	2	3	4	5	6	7	8	9	10	Final
Nova Scotia (LaRocque) 🔨	0	1	0	0	1	0	0	0	1	X	3
Quebec (Charette)	1	0	1	2	0	0	1	3	0	X	8

Sheet H	1	2	3	4	5	6	7	8	9	10	Final
Alberta (Turner) 🔨	1	0	1	0	2	2	0	0	2	X	8
Ontario (Greenwood)	0	3	0	1	0	0	4	1	0	X	9

==== Draw 15 ====
Sheet A	1	2	3	4	5	6	7	8	9	10	Final
Alberta (Turner) 🔨	3	1	0	1	0	1	0	2	1	X	9
Northern Ontario (Broughton)	0	0	2	0	1	0	2	0	0	X	5

Sheet C	1	2	3	4	5	6	7	8	9	10	11	Final
Manitoba (Carter) 🔨	0	1	0	0	0	2	0	0	0	2	0	5
Nova Scotia (LaRocque)	0	0	0	2	1	0	0	2	0	0	1	6

Sheet E	1	2	3	4	5	6	7	8	9	10	Final
Yukon/Northwest Territories (Burrell) 🔨	1	0	0	0	0	X	X	X	X	X	1
Quebec (Charette)	0	5	3	3	1	X	X	X	X	X	12

Sheet G	1	2	3	4	5	6	7	8	9	10	Final
Saskatchewan (Rowan) 🔨	0	0	0	1	0	0	2	0	0	1	4
New Brunswick (Vaughan)	0	1	0	0	0	1	0	0	1	0	3

==== Draw 16 ====
Sheet B	1	2	3	4	5	6	7	8	9	10	Final
Nova Scotia (LaRocque) 🔨	0	1	0	2	0	2	0	0	2	1	8
British Columbia (Sillars)	1	0	1	0	1	0	1	1	0	0	5

Sheet D	1	2	3	4	5	6	7	8	9	10	Final
Newfoundland (Bartlett) 🔨	0	0	1	0	0	0	0	1	0	X	2
Ontario (Greenwood)	0	1	0	1	0	0	2	0	1	X	5

Sheet F	1	2	3	4	5	6	7	8	9	10	Final
Northern Ontario (Broughton) 🔨	1	0	1	0	1	0	1	0	1	X	5
Manitoba (Carter)	0	0	0	3	0	3	0	2	0	X	8

Sheet H	1	2	3	4	5	6	7	8	9	10	Final
Prince Edward Island (Enman) 🔨	2	1	2	1	2	1	0	2	X	X	11
Yukon/Northwest Territories (Burrell)	0	0	0	0	0	0	1	0	X	X	1

==== Draw 17 ====
Sheet A	1	2	3	4	5	6	7	8	9	10	Final
Quebec (Charette) 🔨	3	3	0	1	0	1	0	0	1	1	10
Alberta (Turner)	0	0	4	0	1	0	0	4	0	0	9

Sheet C	1	2	3	4	5	6	7	8	9	10	Final
Ontario (Greenwood) 🔨	1	1	0	4	0	2	0	2	2	X	12
Prince Edward Island (Enman)	0	0	1	0	2	0	2	0	0	X	5

Sheet E	1	2	3	4	5	6	7	8	9	10	Final
New Brunswick (Vaughan) 🔨	0	0	1	2	0	0	0	2	0	1	6
Newfoundland (Bartlett)	1	0	0	0	0	0	2	0	2	0	5

Sheet G	1	2	3	4	5	6	7	8	9	10	Final
British Columbia (Sillars) 🔨	2	0	0	2	0	2	0	2	3	X	11
Saskatchewan (Rowan)	0	1	2	0	1	0	2	0	0	X	6

=== Playoffs ===
Semifinal		Final
Alberta	4
British Columbia	8	Ontario	9
		British Columbia	7

==== Semifinal ====
Sheet D	1	2	3	4	5	6	7	8	9	10	Final
Alberta (Turner)	0	0	0	1	1	0	2	0	0	X	4
British Columbia (Sillars) 🔨	1	2	1	0	0	1	0	3	0	X	8

Player percentages
Alberta		British Columbia	
Darlene Breckenridge	80%	Maureen Anderson	53%
Marilyn Toews	59%	Beryl Cook	61%
Arlene Sali	63%	Betty Rieder	63%
Sandy Turner	54%	Jeanette Sillars	64%
Total	64%	Total	61%

==== Final ====
Sheet F	1	2	3	4	5	6	7	8	9	10	Final
Ontario (Greenwood) 🔨	3	0	1	0	1	1	0	3	0	X	9
British Columbia (Sillars)	0	2	0	2	0	0	1	0	2	X	7

Player percentages
Ontario		British Columbia	
Vicki Lauder	82%	Maureen Anderson	73%
Gloria Campbell	85%	Beryl Cook	59%
Yvonne Smith	69%	Betty Rieder	57%
Jill Greenwood	74%	Jeanette Sillars	74%
Total	77%	Total	66%
