= Marie Toole =

Canadian curler (1926–2021)

Medal record

Women's Curling

Representing Prince Edward Island

Canadian Women's Curling Championship
| Silver medal – second place | 1974 Victoria | |
| Bronze medal – third place | 1969 Fort William | |

Marie Toole (1926 – April 6, 2021) was a Canadian curler from Charlottetown, Prince Edward Island. She was a six-time provincial women's champion and three-time provincial mixed champion. Her team finished in second place at the 1974 Macdonald Lassies Championship, Canada's national women's curling championship.

Toole was born in South Melville, Prince Edward Island, the daughter of Peter Toole and Byna Malone.

== Career ==
Toole won her first provincial mixed title in 1966, throwing third stones on the Doug Bell rink. The team represented Prince Edward Island at the 1966 Canadian Mixed Curling Championship. At the Canadian Mixed, the team finished with a 3–7 record.

In 1967, Toole won her first provincial women's championship, throwing third rocks on the Elizabeth MacDonald rink. The team represented the island at the 1967 Diamond D Championship, where they finished with a 2–7 record. Toole won her second provincial mixed title that year, playing third for Allan Smith. Prince Edward Island finished with a 4–6 record at the 1967 Canadian Mixed.

In 1969, Toole won her second provincial women's championship, skippig a rink of Jennie Boomhower, Mary Acorn and Pauline Johnston. At the 1969 Canadian Ladies Curling Association Championship, the team "surprised many", by finishing with a 6–3 record, and finishing in third place.

In 1970, Toole won her third provincial women's title, with teammates Boomhower, Cathy Dillon and Johnston. They represented the province at the 1970 Canadian Ladies Curling Association Championship, where they finished with a 4–5 record. In 1971, Toole with the same team won her fourth provincial championship, and third in a row. At the 1971 Canadian Ladies Curling Association Championship, she led PEI to a 5–4 record, tied for fourth. The team won another provincial title in 1972, and finished with a 5–4 record again at the 1972 Macdonald Lassies Championship.

In 1973, Toole won her third provincial mixed championship, throwing third rocks for the Doug Cameron team. The team represented Prince Edward Island at the 1973 Canadian Mixed Championship, The team finished the tournament with a 5–5 record.

In 1974, Toole with her team of Boomhower, Dillon and Johnston won her sixth title, and fourth with that line up. At the 1974 Macdonald Lassies Championship, Toole led Prince Edward Island to a second-place finish, with a 7–2 record. Their success at the "Lassie" was considered to be "[t]he surprise of the week".

== Personal life ==
In addition to curling, Toole was a keen golfer. She served Secretary/Treasurer of the PEI Ladies Curling Association from 1962 to 1964 and as president of the Charlottetown Ladies Curling Club in 1973–74. She was inducted into the Prince Edward Island Curling Hall of Fame in 2008.

Toole died in 2021 at the Mount Continuing Care Community in Charlottetown.
