= Emily Farnham =

Canadian curler

Medal record

Curling

Macdonald Lassies Championship
Gold medal – first place	1974 Victoria	

Emily Blanche Farnham (April 14, 1937 in Tisdale, Saskatchewan–November 20, 2021) was a Canadian curler. She and her team of Linda Saunders, Pat McBeath and Donna Collins from the Nutana Curling Club in Saskatoon dominated the women's curling scene during the 1973-74 season, capping the year off by winning the 1974 Macdonald Lassies Championship, Canada's national women's curling championship.

Farnham grew up in Tisdale, where she was introduced to curling by her father. She moved to Prince Albert, Saskatchewan in 1946, and then to Saskatoon in 1962.

Farnham and Collins had been teammates for seven years before University of Saskatchewan curlers Saunders and McBeath joined the team in 1973. During the 1973-74 season, the team won four major cashpiels in Saskatchewan before winning the provincial championship and representing Saskatchewan at the 1974 Macdonald Lassies Championship. Farham had tried unsuccessfully for 13 years before winning the Saskatchewan provincial championship. At the national championship, her rink went undefeated, winning all nine of their games en route to the national championship. It would be the sixth championship in a row for rinks representing Saskatchewan. In total, Team Farnham won 118 of 120 games over the course of the season, losing just two games - one to a men's team, and one in the Northern Saskatchewan playdowns.

In 1989, Farnham became the first woman to win the Canadian Senior Curling Championships, after having previously won the national women's championship. Farnham and her rink of Mary Todarchuk, Mary Heidt, Arlie Ellsworth won the Seniors Championship that year for Saskatchewan. At the national championship, the team finished the round robin with a 7-3 record, and then had to win a tiebreaker, before winning two playoff games to claim the championship. Farnham and Heidt were also members of Team Saskatchewan at the 1988 Canadian Senior Championship, where they finished with a 5-5 record. Farnham won another provincial Seniors title in 1991, and lost in the finals of the 1991 Canadian Senior Curling Championships.

The 1973-74 Farmham rink was inducted into the Saskatchewan Sports Hall of Fame in 2000 and the Saskatoon Sports Hall of Fame in 1993. Her 1989 Senior team was inducted into the Saskatoon Sports Hall of Fame in 1993 as well. Farnham was inducted into the Canadian Curling Hall of Fame in 1993.

Farnham moved to Airdrie, Alberta in 2007 and died on November 20, 2021.

== Personal life ==
Farnham was the daughter of Raymond and Bessie Farnham. In addition to curling, Farnham also golfed, and was a member of the Greenbrye Golf Club. She was married to Sandi Sheppard, and worked at the University of Saskatchewan and at the Bank of Montreal while living in Prince Albert.
