= Vera Pezer =

Canadian curler

- Curler
- Born: January 13, 1939 (age 87); Melfort, Saskatchewan, Canada

Curling career
- Hearts: 4 (1969, 1971, 1972, 1973)

Vera Rose Pezer (born 13 January 1939) is a Canadian athlete and administrator. Pezer was the Chancellor of the University of Saskatchewan from 2007 to 2013. A sports enthusiast, Pezer is a Canadian softball champion, golfing contender, and curling champion. She has been inducted into both the Saskatchewan Sports Halls of Fame and the Canadian Curling Hall of Fame. In 2019, Pezer was named the ninth greatest Canadian curler in history in a TSN poll of broadcasters, reporters and top curlers.

== Education ==
Pezer attended school in Meskanaw. She received her BA in English in 1962 from the University of Saskatchewan. Continuing on, she received her MA in 1964 and her PhD in sports psychology as of 1977.

== Career at the University of Saskatchewan ==
From 1991 to 2001, Pezer served as the University of Saskatchewan associate vice-president of Student Affairs and Services. In other capacities on campus, she has been director of Student Counselling (1978), assistant professor of Psychology and assistant dean of the College of Arts and Science (1978 and 1981). In 2007, Pezer, Peter Zakreski, Gary Carlson and Judy Buzowetsky were candidates for the 2007 position of Chancellor of the University of Saskatchewan. On July 1, 2007, Pezer was elected Chancellor and served 2 terms as Chancellor until her retirement on June 30, 2013.

== Community service ==
Pezer has also served the local community as chair of the Board of Directors for Saskatchewan Place, 1989 Brier Ceremonies and 1989 Jeux Canada Games Foundation. She also served as board member for several agencies such as the Saskatoon Housing Coalition, Leisure Services Advisory (City of Saskatoon), University of Saskatchewan Huskie Athletic Endowment Fund, and Waskesiu Golf Course. Additionally, she was the Education representative on the Certified General Accountants of Saskatchewan Board. Pezer has held several volunteer positions in Saskatoon; among these are for the Saskatoon Board of Police Commissioners, Saskatchewan Centennial Gala, Hope Cancer Race for Recovery, Saskatoon Housing Coalition, and the YWCA. She also held the position of Director of the 1991 Scott Tournament of Hearts.

== Curling ==
She is a four-time Canadian Women's curling champion. Pezer has also served as Sport Psychologist to the Canadian Curling Teams in two Olympic Games. Pezer's curling team has been inducted into the Canadian Curling Hall of Fame in 1976, the Saskatchewan Hall of Fame in 1982 and the Saskatoon Hall of Fame in 1990. In 1975, Pezer coached the Canadian Junior Curling Championship rink.

Pezer was involved in the very first Battle of the Sexes in curling, in which she defeated Orest Meleschuk's team.

After her curling career, Pezer was a curling analyst for TSN.

Tournament	Winning Locale	Winning Team
Canadian Ladies Curling Association Championship
1969	Saskatchewan	Joyce McKee, Vera Pezer, Lenore Morrison, Jennifer Falk
1971	Saskatchewan	Vera Pezer, Sheila Rowan, Joyce McKee, Lenore Morrison
Macdonald Lassies Championship
1972	Saskatchewan	Vera Pezer, Sheila Rowan, Joyce McKee, Lenore Morrison
1973	Saskatchewan	Vera Pezer, Sheila Rowan, Joyce McKee, Lenore Morrison

== Golf ==
Pezer played in two Canadian Senior Ladies competitions.

== Fastball ==
Pezer was a member of the Saskatoon Imperials which rose to national fastball championships in 1969 and 1970.

== Publications ==
Pezer has published The Stone Age: A Social History of Curling in the Prairies 2003 and "Smart Curling" in 2007.

== Other awards ==
Pezer Crescent, Court, Cove and Lane honours the accomplishments of Pezer, curling skip who won three consecutive Canadian ladies curling championships. Silverspring neighborhood roads honour famous athletes. The University of Saskatchewan Board of Governors appointed Pezer to the status of Associate Vice-President, Student Affairs and Services Emerita. In 2006, Pezer was honoured with a Saskatchewan Centennial Medal, and received the University of Saskatchewan Alumni Award of Achievement in 2002.

== See also ==
- Scotties Tournament of Hearts
- List of curlers

Preceded by W. Thomas Molloy	Chancellor of the University of Saskatchewan; 2007–2013	Succeeded by Blaine Favel
