= Sheila Rowan =

Canadian softball player and curler

Sheila Anne "Stretch" Rowan (April 22, 1940 – August 2, 2014) was a Canadian curler from Saskatoon.

Rowan was born in Young, Saskatchewan where she grew up before moving to Plenty, Saskatchewan in 1953 and Saskatoon in 1955 where she graduated from Sion Academy. After high school, she worked as a secretary and a buyer. After retiring, she was a school bus driver.

Rowan was a talented athlete at both softball and curling. In softball, she won many league and provincial championships, as well as winning the 1970 Canadian Softball Championship. The team represented Canada at the 1970 Women's Softball World Championship. As a curler, Rowan was a member of the three-time national champion Vera Pezer rink, playing third for the team. They won national titles in 1971, 1972 and 1973. Rowan would later go on to play skip, winning two more provincial titles in 1983 (4-6 at 1983 Scott Tournament of Hearts) and 1985 (3-7 at 1985 Scott Tournament of Hearts).

Rowan skipped Saskatchewan to win the 1992 Canadian Senior Curling Championships. She won a second provincial senior title in 1996 and represented Saskatchewan at the 1996 Canadian Seniors.

Rowan was inducted into the Canadian Curling Hall of Fame in 1976.
