= 1969 Canadian Ladies Curling Association Championship =

Canadian women's curling championship

- Host city: Fort William, Ontario
- Arena: Fort William Curling and Athletic Club
- Dates: February 24–27
- Winner: Saskatchewan
- Curling club: Hub City CC, Saskatoon
- Skip: Joyce McKee
- Third: Vera Pezer
- Second: Lenore Morrison
- Lead: Jennifer Falk

The 1969 Canadian Ladies Curling Association Championship the Canadian women's curling championship was held from February 24 to 27, 1969 at the Fort William Curling and Athletic Club in Fort William, Ontario.

Team Saskatchewan, who was skipped by Joyce McKee won the event by finishing the round robin with a 8-1 record. This was Saskatchewan's second championship and second for Joyce McKee's rink with her first coming in 1961.

This was the second time that the championship came down to a "winner take all" final draw (the first was in 1965) as both Ontario and Saskatchewan entered their matchup in with identical 7–1 records in round robin play. Ontario jumped out to a 4–1 lead after four ends, but Saskatchewan rallied with singles in four straight ends to take a 5–4 lead after eight ends. A single by Ontario in the ninth tied things up at 5 heading into the final end. Saskatchewan, with hammer in the final end scored one to clinch the championship by a 6–5 score.

The Quebec rink became the second team ever to finish round robin play winless joining the 1964 Newfoundland rink.

The tournament set a then record for most extra end games in one tournament with eight. This shattered the mark set the previous year of five.

== Teams ==
The teams are listed as follows:

Alberta	British Columbia	Manitoba	New Brunswick	Newfoundland
Medicine Hat Evening Ladies CC, Medicine Hat Skip: Simonne Flynn; Third: Eleanor Geddes; Second: Jean Myrol; Lead: Fern Muirhead	Kimberley CC, Kimberley Skip: May Shaw; Third: Mary Yaschuk; Second: Carol Klinck; Lead: Barbara Weir	Fort Garry Business Girls CC, Fort Garry Skip: Pat Brunsdon; Third: Joan Ingram; Second: Lorraine Bradawaski; Lead: Dot Rose	Beaver CC, Moncton Skip: Phylis Chapman; Third: Dorothy Thompson; Second: Mary Cooper; Lead: Felice Willdon	Grand Falls CC, Grand Falls Skip: Violet Pike; Third: Caroline Ball; Second: Doreen Parker; Lead: Mary Rockwood
Nova Scotia	Ontario	Prince Edward Island	Quebec	Saskatchewan
North Sydney CC, North Sydney Skip: Mary Naddaf; Third: Alice Quirk; Second: Helen Douglas; Lead: Vera Crane	Kenora CC, Kenora Skip: June Shaw; Third: Shirley Wiebe; Second: Faye Devins; Lead: Dorothy Holmgren	Charlottetown CC, Charlottetown Skip: Marie Toole; Third: Jennie Boomhower; Second: Mary Acorn; Lead: Pauline Johnston	Lachute CC, Lachute Skip: Leona MacKimmie; Third: Bobbie Paul; Second: Patricia MacLean; Lead: Lena Bradshaw	Hub City CC, Saskatoon Skip: Joyce McKee; Third: Vera Pezer; Second: Lenore Morrison; Lead: Jennifer Falk

== Map of teams ==
Provincial Winners

== Round robin standings ==
Final Round Robin standings

Key
Ladies Curling champion

Province	Skip	W	L	PF	PA
Saskatchewan	Joyce McKee	8	1	76	41
Ontario	June Shaw	7	2	75	43
Prince Edward Island	Marie Toole	6	3	81	80
Alberta	Simonne Flynn	5	4	64	63
British Columbia	May Shaw	5	4	67	60
Manitoba	Pat Brunsdon	5	4	81	58
Newfoundland	Violet Pike	4	5	66	71
New Brunswick	Phylis Chapman	3	6	69	78
Nova Scotia	Mary Naddaf	2	7	47	89
Quebec	Leona MacKimmie	0	9	44	87

== Round robin results ==
All draw times are listed in Eastern Standard Time (UTC-05:00).

=== Draw 1 ===
Monday, February 24, 2:30 pm

Team	1	2	3	4	5	6	7	8	9	10	Final
British Columbia (M. Shaw)	0	0	0	1	0	0	3	0	2	0	6
Alberta (Flynn)	1	3	1	0	2	1	0	1	0	1	10

Team	1	2	3	4	5	6	7	8	9	10	Final
Saskatchewan (McKee)	0	2	0	3	2	3	1	2	0	X	13
Nova Scotia (Naddaf)	1	0	1	0	0	0	0	0	1	X	3

Team	1	2	3	4	5	6	7	8	9	10	Final
Manitoba (Brundson)	0	0	1	0	1	0	1	1	0	X	4
Ontario (J. Shaw)	1	1	0	2	0	4	0	0	1	X	9

Team	1	2	3	4	5	6	7	8	9	10	11	Final
Prince Edward Island (Toole)	0	0	2	2	0	1	0	3	0	2	3	13
New Brunswick (Chapman)	2	1	0	0	3	0	2	0	2	0	0	10

Team	1	2	3	4	5	6	7	8	9	10	11	Final
Newfoundland (Pike)	0	1	1	2	0	0	1	1	0	0	1	7
Quebec (MacKimmie)	2	0	0	0	1	1	0	0	1	1	0	6

=== Draw 2 ===
Monday, February 24, 8:00 pm

Team	1	2	3	4	5	6	7	8	9	10	Final
Quebec (MacKimmie)	0	0	0	0	1	1	0	0	2	0	4
New Brunswick (Chapman)	2	1	1	2	0	0	1	1	0	3	11

Team	1	2	3	4	5	6	7	8	9	10	Final
Manitoba (Brundson)	0	2	3	0	1	0	3	0	1	3	13
Prince Edward Island (Toole)	2	0	0	1	0	1	0	2	0	0	6

Team	1	2	3	4	5	6	7	8	9	10	Final
Saskatchewan (McKee)	0	0	1	0	1	1	1	0	1	0	5
Alberta (Flynn)	3	2	0	2	0	0	0	2	0	1	10

Team	1	2	3	4	5	6	7	8	9	10	Final
Newfoundland (Pike)	0	0	2	0	0	1	1	1	0	2	7
British Columbia (M. Shaw)	2	1	0	1	4	0	0	0	1	0	9

Team	1	2	3	4	5	6	7	8	9	10	Final
Nova Scotia (Naddaf)	1	0	0	0	0	0	0	1	0	0	2
Ontario (J. Shaw)	0	1	1	1	1	1	1	0	1	2	9

=== Draw 3 ===
Tuesday, February 25, 9:30 am

Team	1	2	3	4	5	6	7	8	9	10	Final
Newfoundland (Pike)	0	0	1	0	1	0	0	1	0	1	4
Saskatchewan (McKee)	0	1	0	1	0	2	2	0	2	0	8

Team	1	2	3	4	5	6	7	8	9	10	Final
British Columbia (M. Shaw)	0	1	0	1	0	0	2	0	4	0	8
Ontario (J. Shaw)	0	0	0	0	0	1	0	1	0	1	3

Team	1	2	3	4	5	6	7	8	9	10	Final
Nova Scotia (Naddaf)	0	0	1	0	0	0	3	0	1	0	5
New Brunswick (Chapman)	1	1	0	2	1	2	0	2	0	1	10

Team	1	2	3	4	5	6	7	8	9	10	Final
Manitoba (Brundson)	3	0	1	0	2	3	1	0	2	X	12
Quebec (MacKimmie)	0	1	0	1	0	0	0	1	0	X	3

Team	1	2	3	4	5	6	7	8	9	10	Final
Prince Edward Island (Toole)	1	2	1	3	0	0	4	0	0	1	12
Alberta (Flynn)	0	0	0	0	2	1	0	1	1	0	5

=== Draw 4 ===
Tuesday, February 25, 8:00 pm

Team	1	2	3	4	5	6	7	8	9	10	Final
Prince Edward Island (Toole)	0	1	0	0	0	0	2	1	0	X	4
Ontario (J. Shaw)	1	0	4	1	1	5	0	0	2	X	14

Team	1	2	3	4	5	6	7	8	9	10	Final
Newfoundland (Pike)	0	1	0	1	0	2	0	2	1	0	7
Nova Scotia (Naddaf)	1	0	1	0	1	0	2	0	0	1	6

Team	1	2	3	4	5	6	7	8	9	10	11	Final
British Columbia (M. Shaw)	0	2	0	0	1	1	0	1	1	0	2	8
Quebec (MacKimmie)	1	0	1	2	0	0	1	0	0	1	0	6

Team	1	2	3	4	5	6	7	8	9	10	Final
Alberta (Flynn)	3	0	0	2	0	0	0	1	0	0	6
New Brunswick (Chapman)	0	1	1	0	1	3	0	0	3	3	12

Team	1	2	3	4	5	6	7	8	9	10	Final
Manitoba (Brundson)	0	1	0	1	0	1	0	0	2	0	5
Saskatchewan (McKee)	2	0	0	0	1	0	0	3	0	2	8

=== Draw 5 ===
Wednesday, February 26, 9:30 am

Team	1	2	3	4	5	6	7	8	9	10	Final
Manitoba (Brundson)	4	3	0	5	0	1	0	2	X	X	15
Nova Scotia (Naddaf)	0	0	1	0	1	0	1	0	X	X	3

Team	1	2	3	4	5	6	7	8	9	10	Final
Quebec (MacKimmie)	0	1	0	2	0	2	0	1	0	1	7
Alberta (Flynn)	3	0	2	0	0	0	2	0	1	0	8

Team	1	2	3	4	5	6	7	8	9	10	11	Final
Newfoundland (Pike)	1	0	4	0	0	0	2	0	0	3	0	10
Prince Edward Island (Toole)	0	1	0	4	1	0	0	2	2	0	3	13

Team	1	2	3	4	5	6	7	8	9	10	Final
British Columbia (M. Shaw)	0	0	0	1	0	0	1	0	1	0	3
Saskatchewan (McKee)	0	1	0	0	0	1	0	2	0	1	5

Team	1	2	3	4	5	6	7	8	9	10	Final
Ontario (J. Shaw)	3	3	0	1	2	0	1	0	1	X	11
New Brunswick (Chapman)	0	0	1	0	0	1	0	1	0	X	3

=== Draw 6 ===
Wednesday, February 26, 2:30 pm

Team	1	2	3	4	5	6	7	8	9	10	Final
British Columbia (M. Shaw)	0	1	0	0	1	0	2	2	0	1	7
Prince Edward Island (Toole)	2	0	1	2	0	1	0	0	2	0	8

Team	1	2	3	4	5	6	7	8	9	10	Final
Saskatchewan (McKee)	2	2	1	0	1	0	0	0	2	0	8
New Brunswick (Chapman)	0	0	0	1	0	1	1	1	0	1	5

Team	1	2	3	4	5	6	7	8	9	10	Final
Quebec (MacKimmie)	0	0	1	0	1	0	1	0	1	0	4
Ontario (J. Shaw)	2	2	0	2	0	1	0	2	0	1	10

Team	1	2	3	4	5	6	7	8	9	10	Final
Nova Scotia (Naddaf)	0	1	0	1	0	0	0	1	0	1	4
Alberta (Flynn)	1	0	1	0	0	4	1	0	1	0	8

Team	1	2	3	4	5	6	7	8	9	10	11	Final
Newfoundland (Pike)	0	4	0	0	1	1	0	1	0	1	0	8
Manitoba (Brundson)	3	0	1	1	0	0	1	0	2	0	2	10

=== Draw 7 ===
Wednesday, February 26, 8:00 pm

Team	1	2	3	4	5	6	7	8	9	10	Final
Nova Scotia (Naddaf)	2	0	0	1	0	0	1	0	2	2	8
Quebec (MacKimmie)	0	0	1	0	1	2	0	2	0	0	6

Team	1	2	3	4	5	6	7	8	9	10	Final
Manitoba (Brundson)	2	0	0	0	0	1	0	1	0	0	4
Alberta (Flynn)	0	2	1	1	2	0	1	0	2	0	9

Team	1	2	3	4	5	6	7	8	9	10	Final
Prince Edward Island (Toole)	0	0	0	1	0	0	0	0	1	X	2
Saskatchewan (McKee)	1	1	2	0	2	1	1	2	0	X	10

Team	1	2	3	4	5	6	7	8	9	10	Final
Newfoundland (Pike)	0	1	2	0	1	0	1	1	0	1	7
Ontario (J. Shaw)	2	0	0	2	0	2	0	0	2	0	8

Team	1	2	3	4	5	6	7	8	9	10	Final
British Columbia (M. Shaw)	0	2	0	2	0	2	2	0	2	X	10
New Brunswick (Chapman)	1	0	1	0	1	0	0	3	0	X	6

=== Draw 8 ===
Thursday, February 27, 9:30 am

Team	1	2	3	4	5	6	7	8	9	10	11	Final
Ontario (J. Shaw)	1	0	0	1	0	2	0	1	0	0	1	6
Alberta (Flynn)	0	1	1	0	2	0	0	0	0	1	0	5

Team	1	2	3	4	5	6	7	8	9	10	Final
Newfoundland (Pike)	1	1	4	0	0	0	0	2	0	1	9
New Brunswick (Chapman)	0	0	0	1	1	1	1	0	4	0	8

Team	1	2	3	4	5	6	7	8	9	10	11	Final
Manitoba (Brundson)	0	1	0	2	0	0	0	1	0	2	0	6
British Columbia (M. Shaw)	1	0	1	0	1	1	1	0	1	0	2	8

Team	1	2	3	4	5	6	7	8	9	10	Final
Prince Edward Island (Toole)	1	0	3	1	0	6	0	2	0	0	13
Nova Scotia (Naddaf)	0	1	0	0	2	0	2	0	1	1	7

Team	1	2	3	4	5	6	7	8	9	10	Final
Saskatchewan (McKee)	0	2	1	3	1	1	0	4	1	0	13
Quebec (MacKimmie)	2	0	0	0	0	0	1	0	0	1	4

=== Draw 9 ===
Thursday, February 27, 8:00 pm

Team	1	2	3	4	5	6	7	8	9	10	Final
Manitoba (Brundson)	0	2	2	0	0	3	2	2	0	1	12
New Brunswick (Chapman)	1	0	0	1	1	0	0	0	1	0	4

Team	1	2	3	4	5	6	7	8	9	10	Final
Prince Edward Island (Toole)	0	1	2	0	1	2	3	0	0	1	10
Quebec (MacKimmie)	1	0	0	1	0	0	0	1	1	0	4

Team	1	2	3	4	5	6	7	8	9	10	Final
Newfoundland (Pike)	0	1	1	0	1	1	1	0	2	0	7
Alberta (Flynn)	0	0	0	1	0	0	0	1	0	1	3

Team	1	2	3	4	5	6	7	8	9	10	Final
Saskatchewan (McKee)	0	0	1	0	1	1	1	1	0	1	6
Ontario (J. Shaw)	1	1	0	2	0	0	0	0	1	0	5

Team	1	2	3	4	5	6	7	8	9	10	11	Final
British Columbia (M. Shaw)	3	0	3	0	0	0	1	0	0	1	0	8
Nova Scotia (Naddaf)	0	1	0	2	2	1	0	2	0	0	1	9
