= Pamela Sanford =

Canadian curler

- Curler ♀
- Other names: Pam

Team
- Curling club: Halifax CC, Halifax, NS

Curling career
- Member Association: Nova Scotia
- Hearts: 1: (1983)
- World Championship: 1 (1983)
Medal record
Curling
Representing Canada
World Championships
Bronze medal – third place	1983 Moose Jaw
Representing Nova Scotia
Scott Tournament of Hearts
Gold medal – first place	1983 Prince George

Pamela "Pam" Sanford (born c. 1958) is a former Canadian curler.

She is a 1983 World women's bronze medallist and 1983 Scott Tournament of Hearts champion.

As of 2022, she works as Head Curling Coach for Special Olympics Halifax program, located at Mayflower Curling Club.

== Teams ==
Season	Skip	Third	Second	Lead	Events
1982–83	Penny LaRocque	Sharon Horne	Cathy Caudle	Pamela Sanford	STOH 1983 (gold); WCC 1983 (bronze)
1983–84	Penny LaRocque	Mary Sue Radford	Cathy Caudle	Pam Sanford	
