= Sharon Horne (curler) =

Canadian curler

- Curler ♀

Curling career
- Member Association: Nova Scotia (1973–2001); Prince Edward Island (2013-present)
- Hearts: 2: (1974, 1983)
- World Championship: 1 (1983)
Medal record
Curling
Representing Canada
World Championships
Bronze medal – third place	1983 Moose Jaw
Representing Nova Scotia
Scott Tournament of Hearts
Gold medal – first place	1983 Prince George

Sharon Horne (born c. 1943) (also known as Sharon Clarke-Horne) is a Canadian curler currently living in Halifax, Nova Scotia.

She is a 1983 World women's bronze medallist and 1983 Scott Tournament of Hearts champion.

== Awards ==
- STOH All-Star Team: 1983.

== Teams ==
Season	Skip	Third	Second	Lead	Events
1973–74	Joyce Myers	Sharon Horne	Penny LaRocque	Vickie Noseworthy	STOH 1974 (9th)
1982–83	Penny LaRocque	Sharon Horne	Cathy Caudle	Pamela Sanford	STOH 1983 (gold); WCC 1983 (bronze)
1997–98	Penny LaRocque	Sharon Horne	Ann Donaldson	Margaret Cameron	CSCC 1998 (bronze)
2000–01	Penny LaRocque	Sharon Clarke-Horne	Sharon Low	Louise MacPhee	CSCC 2001 (6th)
2013–14	Sharon Horne	Kim Ellsworth	Wendy Fraser	Allison Griffin	CCCC 2013 (10th)
2016–17	Sharon Horne	Bobbie-Jean Boylan	Alison Griffin	Iva Griffin	CCCC 2016 (12th)
2018–19	Sharon Horne	Wendy Fraser	Anne Marie Muise	Telly Aylward	
