= Cathy Caudle =

Canadian curler

- Curler ♀

Team
- Curling club: Halifax Curling Club, Halifax, NS

Curling career
- Member Association: Nova Scotia (1977-1988); Saskatchewan (1999-2006)
- Hearts: 3: (1983, 1986, 2000)
- World Championship: 1 (1983)
- Other appearances: Canadian Olympic Trials: 1 (1987)
Medal record
Curling
Representing Canada
World Championships
Bronze medal – third place	1983 Moose Jaw
Representing Nova Scotia
Scott Tournament of Hearts
Gold medal – first place	1983 Prince George

Cathy Walter, née Caudle (born c. 1961) is a Canadian former curler.

She is a 1983 World women's bronze medallist and 1983 Scott Tournament of Hearts champion.

== Awards ==
- STOH All-Star Team: 1983.

== Teams ==
Season	Skip	Third	Second	Lead	Alternate	Events
1977–80	Kay Smith	Krista Gatchell	Cathy Caudle	Peggy Wilson		(gold); CJCC 1980
1982–83	Penny LaRocque	Sharon Horne	Cathy Caudle	Pamela Sanford		STOH 1983 (gold); WCC 1983 (bronze)
1983–84	Penny LaRocque	Mary Sue Radford	Cathy Caudle	Pam Sanford		
1985–86	Colleen Jones	Penny LaRocque	Cathy Caudle	Susan Robinson	Barbara Jones-Gordon	STOH 1986 (8th)
1987–88	Colleen Jones	Kay Smith	Kim Dolan	Cathy Caudle		COCT 1987
1999–00	June Campbell	Cathy Walter	Karen Daku	Leanne Whitrow	Sherry Anderson	STOH 2000 (4th)
2005–06	Kathy Thiele	Lorie Kehler	Cathy Walter	Leanne Whitrow		
