= Mary Sue Radford =

Canadian curler

- Curler
- Other names: Mary Sue Radford-Hakansson

Team
- Curling club: Mayflower Curling Club, Halifax, NS
- Skip: Theresa Breen
- Third: Kerri Denny
- Second: Jayne Flinn-Burton
- Lead: Mary Sue Radford

Curling career
- Member Association: Nova Scotia
- Hearts: 3 (2004, 2005, 2006)
- World Championship: 1 (2004)
- Other appearances: World Senior Championship: 1 (2017)
Medal record
Women's curling
Representing Canada
World Championships
| Gold medal – first place | 2004 Gävle |
Scotties Tournament of Hearts
| Gold medal – first place | 2004 Red Deer |
World Senior Championships
| Gold medal – first place | 2017 Lethbridge |
Representing Nova Scotia
Scotties Tournament of Hearts
| Bronze medal – third place | 2006 London |

Mary Sue Radford (born c. 1962) is a Canadian curler. She currently plays lead on Team Theresa Breen.

She was the alternate on the 2004 World champion Colleen Jones rink.

== Personal life ==
Her daughter, Katarina Hakansson is also a curler, and her former teammate.

== Teams ==
| Season | Skip | Third | Second | Lead | Alternate | Coach | Events |
|---|---|---|---|---|---|---|---|
| 1980–81 | Krista Gatchell | Cheri Anderson | Mary Sue Radford | Kathy Snarr | | | 1981 CJCC |
| 1983–84 | Penny LaRocque | Mary Sue Radford | Cathy Caudle | Pam Sanford | | | |
| 1989–90 | Margaret Cutcliffe | Sherry Jones | Joan Hutchinson | Mary Sue Radford-Hakansson | | | |
| 2003–04 | Colleen Jones | Kim Kelly | Mary-Anne Arsenault | Nancy Delahunt | Mary Sue Radford | Ken Bagnell | STOH 2004 (gold); WCC 2004 (gold) |
| 2004–05 | Colleen Jones | Kim Kelly | Mary-Anne Arsenault | Nancy Delahunt | Mary Sue Radford | Ken Bagnell | STOH 2005 (6th) |
| 2005–06 | Colleen Jones | Kim Kelly | Mary-Anne Arsenault | Nancy Delahunt | Mary Sue Radford | Ken Bagnell | COCT 2005 (8th); STOH 2006 (bronze) |
| 2008–09 | Mary Mattatall | Mary Sue Radford | Meaghan Smart | Christina Black | | | NS STOH 2009 (8th) |
| 2010–11 | Theresa Breen | Kristen MacDiarmid | Helen Radford | Mary Sue Radford | | | NS STOH 2011 (silver) |
| 2011–12 | Colleen Jones | Kristen MacDiarmid | Helen Radford | Mary Sue Radford | Katarina Danbrook | | |
| 2012–13 | Margaret Cutcliffe | Mary Sue Radford | Katarina Hakansson | Sally Saunders | | | NS STOH 2013 (6th) |
| 2013–14 | Christina Black (fourth) | Jane Snyder | Katarina Hakansson | Mary Sue Radford (skip) | | | NS STOH 2014 (8th) |
| 2014–15 | Colleen Jones | Kim Kelly | Mary Sue Radford | Nancy Delahunt | | | CSCC 2015 (silver) |
| 2015–16 | Colleen Jones | Kim Kelly | Mary Sue Radford | Nancy Delahunt | | | NS STOH 2016 (4th); CSCC 2016 (gold) |
| 2016–17 | Colleen Jones | Kim Kelly | Mary Sue Radford | Nancy Delahunt | | Helen Radford | WSCC 2017 (gold) |
| 2017–18 | Colleen Jones | Kim Kelly | Mary Sue Radford | Nancy Delahunt | | | NS STOH 2018 (5th) |
| 2018–19 | Kim Kelly (Fourth) | Colleen Jones (Skip) | Mary Sue Radford | Julia Williams | | | NS STOH 2019 (4th) |
| 2019–20 | Theresa Breen | Marlee Powers | Jocelyn Adams | Amanda Simpson | Mary Sue Radford | | NS STOH 2020 (T5th) |
| 2020–21 | Theresa Breen | Kelly Backman | Stephanie Guzzwell | Mary Sue Radford | Kristen MacDiarmid | | |
| 2021–22 | Theresa Breen | Mary Sue Radford | Julie McMullin | Helen Radford | | | |
| 2022–23 | Theresa Breen | Mary Sue Radford | Julie McMullin | Helen Radford | Heather Smith | | |
| 2024–25 | Theresa Breen (Fourth) | Kerri Denny | Jayne Flinn-Burton | Mary Sue Radford (skip) | | | 2024 CSCC |
