= Sandra Jenkins =

Canadian curler (born 1961)

- Curler
- Born: Sandra Rippel; July 20, 1961 (age 65); Fort Saskatchewan, Alberta

Team
- Curling club: Garrison Curling Club, Calgary, Alberta
- Skip: Sandra Jenkins
- Third: Penny Shantz
- Second: Colleen Robson
- Lead: Kate Horne

Curling career
- Hearts: 3 (1982, 1983, 1993)
- Olympic: 1 (2006)
Medal record
Women's curling
Representing Canada
Olympic Games
Bronze medal – third place	2006 Turin
Representing Alberta
Scotties Tournament of Hearts
Silver medal – second place	1983 Prince George
Canadian Olympic Curling Trials
Gold medal – first place	2005 Halifax

Sandra Jenkins (born July 20, 1961 in Fort Saskatchewan, Alberta as Sandra Rippel) is a Canadian curler from Salmon Arm, British Columbia.

Jenkins was the alternate player for the Canadian women's team at the 2006 Winter Olympics skipped by Shannon Kleibrink. Sandra got to play in a few games as some of the members of the team had been ill. She won the bronze medal in the event.

Jenkins played second for Cathy Shaw at the 1982 and 1983 Scott Tournament of Hearts. The team lost in the final in 1983 to Penny LaRocque of Nova Scotia. In 1987 Jenkins was the third for Ken Ursuliak at the Canadian Mixed Curling Championship. Also in 1987 she was in the Olympic Trials playing for Marilyn Darte. She returned to the Scotts in 1989 as an alternate for Debbie Shermack.

In 1993 she joined up with Shannon Kleibrink as her third at that year's Scott Tournament of Hearts. She would not play with Kleibrink again until the 2005 Canadian Olympic Trials. In 2002 Jenkins was the lead for Ken Hunka at the Mixed.

Jenkins currently skips her own team.
