= 2016 Travelers Curling Club Championship =

Canadian national curling championship edition

- Host city: Kelowna, British Columbia
- Arena: Kelowna Curling Club
- Dates: November 23–26
- Men's winner: Ontario
- Curling club: Cataraqui G&CC, Kingston
- Skip: Wesley Forget
- Third: David Staples
- Second: Graham Rathwell
- Lead: Sandy Staples
- Finalist: Saskatchewan
- Women's winner: Manitoba
- Curling club: Fort Rouge CC, Winnipeg
- Skip: Tracy Andries
- Third: Crystal Kennedy
- Second: Diane Christensen
- Lead: April Klassen
- Finalist: Alberta

The 2016 Travelers Curling Club Championship was held from November 23 to 26 at the Kelowna Curling Club in Kelowna, British Columbia.

== Men ==
=== Teams ===
Province	Skip	Third	Second	Lead	Locale
Alberta	Scott Webb	Alex Wolfe	Stephen Byrne	Damien Gnass	Peace River CC, Peace River
British Columbia	Ron Schmidt	Norm Coté	Craig Bernes	Darren Richards	Comox Valley CC, Courtenay
Manitoba	Andrew Wickman	Jeff Tarko	Mark Blanchard	Cam Barth	Fort Rouge CC, Winnipeg
New Brunswick	Shawn Ingersoll	Moe Gautreau	Michael Prince	Hubert Williston	Miramichi CC, Miramichi
Newfoundland and Labrador	Trent Skanes	Nick Lane	Jeff Rose	Mike Mosher	Re/Max Centre, St. John's
Northern Ontario	Gary Weiss	Deron Surkan	Aaron Rogalski	Mark Beazley	Port Arthur CC, Thunder Bay
Northwest Territories	D'arcy Delorey	Paul Delorey	Dan Richards	Glenn Smith	Hay River CC, Hay River
Nova Scotia	Kurt Roach	Mark MacNamara	Kevin Gouthro	Robin Nathanson	Sydney CC, Sydney
Nunavut	Peter Mackey	Jeff Nadeau	Colby O'Donnell	Jamie Gauthier	Iqaluit CC, Iqaluit
Ontario	Wesley Forget	David Staples	Graham Rathwell	Sandy Staples	Cataraqui G&CC, Kingston
Prince Edward Island	Dennis Watts	Erik Brodersen	Andrew MacDougall	Doug MacGregor	Charlottetown CC, Charlottetown
Quebec	Scott Hill	Shawn Blair	Scott McClintock	Taylor Lamb	CC Ormstown, Ormstown
Saskatchewan	Kory Kohuch	David Kraichy	Wes Lang	David Schmirler	Nutana CC, Saskatoon
Yukon	Pat Paslawski	Richard Weihers	Tyler Williams	Trent Derkatch	Whitehorse CC, Whitehorse

=== Round-robin standings ===
==== Pool A ====
Team	W	L
Saskatchewan	6	0
Manitoba	5	1
Alberta	3	3
Prince Edward Island	3	3
Quebec	2	4
Northern Ontario	2	4
Nunavut	0	6

==== Pool B ====
Team	W	L
Ontario	6	0
Nova Scotia	4	2
British Columbia	3	3
Yukon	3	3
Northwest Territories	2	4
Newfoundland and Labrador	2	4
New Brunswick	1	5

== Tiebreakers ==
- Alberta 10-2 Prince Edward Island
- British Columbia 6-5 Yukon

=== Playoffs ===
Quarterfinal
B2	Nova Scotia	5
A3	Alberta	7
A2	Manitoba	1
B3	British Columbia	7

Semifinal
A1	Saskatchewan	4
A3	Alberta	3
B1	Ontario	6
B3	British Columbia	2

Final
A1	Saskatchewan	3
B1	Ontario	6

Bronze Medal Game
A3	Alberta	7
B3	British Columbia	1

==== Final ====
Saturday, November 26, 1:00pm

Team	1	2	3	4	5	6	7	8	Final
Ontario 🔨	1	2	0	0	1	2	0	X	6
Saskatchewan	0	0	1	1	0	0	1	X	3

== Women ==
=== Teams ===
Province	Skip	Third	Second	Lead	Locale
Alberta	Morgan Muise	Lyndsay Allen	Sarah Evans	Gartner Frey	Calgary CC, Calgary
British Columbia	Kim Jonsson	Lonnie Schopp	Mickey Colburn	Yvette Green	Campbell River CC, Campbell River
Manitoba	Tracy Andries	Crystal Kennedy	Diane Christensen	April Klassen	Fort Rouge CC, Winnipeg
New Brunswick	Laurie Donaher	Michelle Majeau	Carol Justason	Anne Beaumont	Curl Moncton, Moncton
Newfoundland and Labrador	Susan Curtis	Patricia Spracklin	Kathryn Miles	Sigrid Fitzpatrick	Corner Brook CC, Corner Brook
Northern Ontario	Kelli Stevenson-Beda	Tricia Sampson	Marcy Barry	Tammy Depiero	Kakabeka Falls CC, Kakabeka Falls
Northwest Territories	Kristan Thompson	Sarah Stroeder	Alanah Jansen	Anneli Jokela	Yellowknife CC, Yellowknife
Nova Scotia	Denise Fitzgerald	Michelle Williams	Mary Porter	Abby Miller	Lakeshore CC, Lower Sackville
Nunavut	Karielle MacKey	Danielle North	Jill Billingham	Carmen Kootoo	Iqaluit CC, Iqaluit
Ontario	Julie O'Neill	Lisa Jones	Susan Cully	Tracy Hiddink	Lindsay CC, Lindsay
Prince Edward Island	Sharon Horne	Bobbie-Jean Boylan	Alison Griffin	Iva Griffin	Western Community CC, Alberton
Quebec	Nathalie Gagnon	Ann-Sophie Guérin	Laurie Verreault	Sylvie Cote	CC Riverbend, Alma
Saskatchewan	Danette Tracey	Jade Bloor	Charla Moore	Lianne Cretin	Weyburn CC, Weyburn
Yukon	Laura Eby	Lorna Spenner	Janine Peters	Tamar Vandenberghe	Whitehorse CC, Whitehorse

=== Round-robin standings ===
==== Pool A ====
Team	W	L
Alberta	5	1
Nova Scotia	5	1
Ontario	5	1
British Columbia	3	3
New Brunswick	2	4
Yukon	1	5
Nunavut	0	6

==== Pool B ====
Team	W	L
Manitoba	4	2
Newfoundland and Labrador	4	2
Quebec	4	2
Saskatchewan	4	2
Northwest Territories	2	4
Northern Ontario	2	4
Prince Edward Island	1	5

=== Tiebreaker ===
- Quebec 6-4 Saskatchewan

=== Playoffs ===
Quarterfinal
B2	Newfoundland and Labrador	3
A3	Ontario	6
A2	Nova Scotia	4
B3	Quebec	9

Semifinal
A1	Alberta	7
A3	Ontario	1
B1	Manitoba	8
B3	Quebec	5

Final
A1	Alberta	5
B1	Manitoba	8

Bronze Medal Game
A3	Ontario	3
B3	Quebec	6

==== Final ====
Saturday, November 26, 1:00

Sheet 8	1	2	3	4	5	6	7	8	Final
Alberta 🔨	0	2	1	0	0	1	1	0	5
Manitoba	1	0	0	1	2	0	0	4	8
