= 2013 The Dominion Curling Club Championship =

Canadian national curling championship edition

- Host city: Thunder Bay, Ontario
- Arena: Fort William Curling Club
- Dates: November 18–23
- Men's winner: Alberta
- Curling club: Crestwood CC, Edmonton
- Skip: Dan Sherrard
- Third: Brandon Klassen
- Second: Kyle Reynolds
- Lead: Todd Kaasten
- Finalist: Saskatchewan (Corey Martens)
- Women's winner: Manitoba
- Curling club: Brandon CC, Brandon
- Skip: Stacey Fordyce
- Third: Christy Erickson
- Second: Stacey Irwin
- Lead: Pam Gouldie
- Finalist: Saskatchewan (Heather Burnett)

The 2013 Dominion Curling Club Championship was held from November 18 to 23 at the Fort William Curling Club in Thunder Bay, Ontario.

== Men ==
=== Teams ===
The teams are listed as follows:

| Province | Skip | Third | Second | Lead | Locale |
|---|---|---|---|---|---|
| Alberta | Dan Sherrard | Brandon Klassen | Scott McClements | Todd Kaasten | Crestwood CC, Edmonton |
| British Columbia | Blaine Black | Shaun Everest | Doug McCrae | Kim Dixon | Penticton CC, Penticton |
| Manitoba | Steve Irwin | Justin Rabe | Travis Brooks | Cody Rabe | Brandon CC, Brandon |
| New Brunswick | Chris Jeffrey | André Boudreau | Charles Savoie | Kim Jeffrey | Curl Moncton, Moncton |
| Newfoundland and Labrador | Scott Davidge | Keith Clarke | Doug Dillon | Neal Blackmore | Gander CC, Gander |
| Northern Ontario | Jason Strelezki | Chris Gordon | Jason Gauthier | Derek Crew | Copper Cliff CC, Copper Cliff |
| Northwest Territories | Paul Delorey | D'arcy Delorey | Dan Richards | Glenn Smith | Hay River CC, Hay River |
| Nova Scotia | Mike Robinson | Glenn Churchill | Owen Graham | Leo McKenna | Dartmouth CC, Dartmouth |
| Nunavut | Wade Kingdon | Peter Mackey | Hunter Tootoo | Steve Sharpe | Iqaluit CC, Iqaluit |
| Ontario | Brent Gray | Brian Gray | Anthony Silvestro | Richard Krell | Kitchener-Waterloo Granite, Waterloo |
| Prince Edward Island | Alan Inman | Steven Thomson | Gordon Fall | Tony Quigley | Crapaud Community CC, Crapaud |
| Quebec | Roger Bertrand | Gaetan Chauret | Martin Patry | Dennis Dumoulin | Buckingham CC, Buckingham |
| Saskatchewan | Corey Martens | Leo Perrin | Kevin Fehr | Chad Krikau | Martensville CC, Saskatoon |
| Yukon | Pat Paslawski | Doug Hamilton | Alexx Peech | Trent Derkatch | Whitehorse CC, Whitehorse |

=== Round-robin standings ===
==== Grey pool ====
| Team | W | L |
|---|---|---|
| Alberta | 5 | 1 |
| Yukon | 5 | 1 |
| New Brunswick | 3 | 3 |
| Northern Ontario | 3 | 3 |
| Northwest Territories | 2 | 4 |
| British Columbia | 2 | 4 |
| Manitoba | 1 | 5 |

==== Blue pool ====
| Team | W | L |
|---|---|---|
| Saskatchewan | 5 | 1 |
| Newfoundland and Labrador | 4 | 2 |
| Nova Scotia | 4 | 2 |
| Ontario | 3 | 3 |
| Prince Edward Island | 2 | 4 |
| Quebec | 2 | 4 |
| Nunavut | 1 | 5 |

=== Tiebreaker ===
- Newfoundland and Labrador 5-3 Nova Scotia

=== Playoffs ===
Semi-final
G1 | Alberta | 10
B2 | Newfoundland and Labrador | 2
B1 | Saskatchewan | 5
G2 | Yukon | 1

Final
G1 | Alberta | 5
B1 | Saskatchewan | 2

== Women ==
The teams are listed as follows:

=== Teams ===
| Province | Skip | Third | Second | Lead | Locale |
|---|---|---|---|---|---|
| Alberta | Lauren Jenkyns | Kathy Piper | Laurie Schreiner | Diana Backer | St. Albert CC, St. Albert |
| British Columbia | Rebecca Turley (fourth) | Amy Gibson (skip) | Michelle Dunn | Marilou Richter | Vancouver CC, Vancouver |
| Manitoba | Stacey Fordyce | Christy Erickson | Stacey Irwin | Pam Gouldie | Brandon CC, Brandon |
| New Brunswick | Paulette Girvan | Nicole Richard | Jennifer Gallagher | Denise Grant | Rexton CC, Rexton |
| Newfoundland and Labrador | Pam Osborne | Candy Thomas | Tina Horlick | Barb Dawson | RE/MAX Centre, St. John's |
| Northern Ontario | Kathie Jackson | Teresa McFadyen | Lisa Penner | Kris Sinclair | Fort Frances CC, Fort Frances |
| Northwest Territories | Monique Gagnier | Katrina Delorey | Olivia Gibbons | Dayna Haley | Hay River CC, Yellowknife |
| Nova Scotia | Marion MacAulay | Kerry Denny | Gilda Chisholm | Ann MacLean | Bluenose CC, New Glasgow |
| Nunavut | Geneva Chislett | Denise Hutchings | Robyn Mackey | Jenine Bodner | Iqaluit CC, Iqaluit |
| Ontario | Michelle Fletcher | Becky Pipes | Mallory Gray | Armaine Smith | Burlington CC, Burlington |
| Prince Edward Island | Sharon Horne | Kim Ellsworth | Wendy Fraser | Allison Griffin | Western Community CC, Alberton |
| Quebec | Janet Fontaine | Beth Robertson | Vicki Norman | Ingrid Spindelmann | CC St-Lambert, Saint-Lambert |
| Saskatchewan | Heather Burnett | Melissa Surkan | Samantha Yachiw | Joanne Wood | Martensville CC, Saskatoon |
| Yukon | Nicole Baldwin | Ladene Shaw | Helen Strong | Rhonda Horte | Whitehorse CC, Whitehorse |

=== Round-robin standings ===
==== Grey pool ====
| Team | W | L |
|---|---|---|
| Manitoba | 6 | 0 |
| Yukon | 4 | 2 |
| Northwest Territories | 3 | 3 |
| Alberta | 3 | 3 |
| British Columbia | 3 | 3 |
| New Brunswick | 1 | 5 |
| Northern Ontario | 1 | 5 |

==== Blue pool ====
| Team | W | L |
|---|---|---|
| Saskatchewan | 6 | 0 |
| Ontario | 5 | 1 |
| Nova Scotia | 4 | 2 |
| Quebec | 3 | 3 |
| Prince Edward Island | 2 | 4 |
| Newfoundland and Labrador | 1 | 5 |
| Nunavut | 0 | 6 |

=== Playoffs ===
Semi-final
G1 | Manitoba | 8
B2 | Ontario | 5
B1 | Saskatchewan | 6
G2 | Yukon | 5

Final
G1 | Manitoba | 6
B1 | Saskatchewan | 4
