= Bas Buckle =

Canadian curler

Medal record

Representing Canada

Men's curling

World Senior championships
| Gold medal – first place | 2004 Gävle | |
| Gold medal – first place | 2005 Howwood | |

Bazel "Bas" Buckle (born c. 1948) is a Canadian curler from Corner Brook, Newfoundland and Labrador. He is a two-time World Senior champion.

Buckle was born in Forteau, Dominion of Newfoundland.

== Career ==
=== Mixed ===
Buckle won his first provincial championship in 1988, playing second on the Gary Oke mixed team. The team, which also consisted of Laura Phillips at third and Diane Boulanger at lead represented Newfoundland at the 1988 Canadian Mixed Curling Championship, where they finished with a 5–6 record. Oke and Buckle won the provincial mixed championship again in 1989, this time with Cindy Crocker at third and Annette Osborne at lead. The rink went on to represent Newfoundland at the 1989 Canadian Mixed. There, the team went win-less, losing all 11 of their matches.

=== Seniors ===
Buckle did not win another provincial championship until 2002, when he skipped his team of Bob Freeman, Gerry Young and Harvey Holloway to a provincial senior (50+) championship. The rink represented Newfoundland and Labrador at the 2002 Canadian Senior Curling Championships, where they team finished with a 3–8 record. The team won another provincial senior title in 2003, and improved their record at the 2003 Canadian Senior Curling Championships, going 4–7. They won a third straight provincial championship in 2004. The team finally found success at the 2004 Canadian Senior Curling Championships. There, Buckle led his team to an 8–3 round robin record, tied for first place with the defending champion Alberta rink, skipped by Tom Reed. The team earned a bye to the final, where they faced off against Nova Scotia's Team Steve Ogden. They beat Nova Scotia in an extra end in the final, 9–8. This earned the team a trip to Sweden to represent Canada at the 2004 World Senior Curling Championships. There, they went undefeated, and beat the United States (skipped by Bill Kind) in the gold medal game, 8–3.

Due to the rescheduling of the Canadian and World Senior Championships which resulted in the two events being held at the same time, the Buckle rink were invited to represent Canada again at the 2005 World Senior Curling Championships without having to play at the Canadian Seniors again. In group play, Buckle led the team to a 5–3 record, putting them in a four-way tie for second place. The team won their tiebreaker game against Germany, then beat Switzerland in the semis before facing off against the United States once again in the semi-final. They were successful again, defeating the David Russell-led rink 5–4.

Team Buckle won another provincial title in 2006. The team could not repeat their success at the 2006 Canadian Senior Curling Championships, going 4–7. Buckle won his final provincial seniors title in 2007 with new third Ken Thomas. At the 2007 Canadian Senior Curling Championships, they finished 4–7 again.

In 2008, Buckle broke his ankle and took some time off from curling.

=== Post seniors ===
Buckle won a provincial masters (60+) title with Oke in 2020. He won the Newfoundland and Labrador Curling Club Championship in 2023, and represented the province at the 2023 Canadian Curling Club Championships, where he led his Corner Brook Curling Club team to an 0–6 record. At the event, he stated it would be his last national championship.

== Personal life ==
Buckle is a retired paper mill worker.
