= 2004 Canadian Senior Curling Championships =

- Host city: Vernon, British Columbia
- Arena: Vernon Multiplex
- Dates: January 23-February 1, 2004
- Men's winner: Newfoundland and Labrador
- Curling club: Rec Plex CC, Corner Brook
- Skip: Bas Buckle
- Third: Bob Freeman
- Second: Gerry Young
- Lead: Harvey Holloway
- Finalist: Nova Scotia
- Women's winner: Ontario
- Skip: Anne Dunn
- Third: Lindy Marchuk
- Second: Gloria Campbell
- Lead: Fran Todd
- Finalist: British Columbia

The 2004 AMJ Campbell Canadian Senior Curling Championships were held January 23 to February 1, 2004 at the Vernon Multiplex in Vernon, British Columbia. The winning teams represented Canada at the 2004 and 2005 World Senior Curling Championships.

== Men's ==
=== Teams ===
Province / Territory	Skip	Third	Second	Lead
British Columbia	Dale Hockley	Ken Watson (skip)	Russell Knutson	Gary Robilliard
Alberta	Tom Reed	Warren Kushnir	Fred McKenzie	Garry Landry
Saskatchewan	Ian Kelln	Larry Doetzel	Marvin Kelln	Arnold Ginther
Manitoba	Neil Andrews	Darryl Andrews	Jim Horn	Doug Conway
Northern Ontario	Rick Lang	Alan Laine	Bruce Kennedy	Brian Adams
Ontario	Bob Turcotte	Roy Weigand	Wayne Lowe	Steve McDermot
Quebec	Rejean Pare	Marcel Bouchard	Carl Bellemarre	Jean-Marie Bouchard
New Brunswick	David Sullivan	Charlie Sullivan Sr.	Tom Rubec	Ken Smith
Nova Scotia	Steve Ogden	Tom Fetterly	Rob McCarron	Glenn Josephson
Prince Edward Island	Ted MacFadyen	Bill MacFadyen	Sandy Foy	Mike Coady
Newfoundland and Labrador	Bas Buckle	Bob Freeman	Gerry Young	Harvey Holloway
Yukon/Northwest Territories	Paul Hunter	Craig Tuton	Dave Hecker	Ross Milward

=== Standings ===
Locale	Skip	W	L
Newfoundland and Labrador	Bas Buckle	8	3
Alberta	Tom Reed	8	3
Nova Scotia	Steve Ogden	7	4
Quebec	Rejean Pare	7	4
Manitoba	Neil Andrews	6	5
Ontario	Bob Turcotte	6	5
British Columbia	Ken Watson	6	5
Prince Edward Island	Ted MacFadyen	5	6
New Brunswick	David Sullivan	4	7
Northern Ontario	Rick Lang	4	7
Saskatchewan	Ian Kelln	3	8
Yukon/Northwest Territories	Paul Hunter	2	9

=== Results ===
==== Draw 1 ====
Sheet B	1	2	3	4	5	6	7	8	9	10	Final
New Brunswick (Sullivan)	0	2	0	0	2	0	1	0	0	X	5
Nova Scotia (Ogden)	1	0	0	3	0	1	0	3	1	X	9

Sheet D	1	2	3	4	5	6	7	8	9	10	Final
Prince Edward Island (MacFadyen)	0	1	0	0	0	0	1	0	1	0	3
British Columbia (Watson)	1	0	0	0	0	2	0	2	0	1	6

Sheet F	1	2	3	4	5	6	7	8	9	10	Final
Ontario (Turcotte)	0	1	0	0	1	0	2	0	1	0	5
Alberta (Reed)	1	0	0	0	0	2	0	1	0	2	6

==== Draw 2 ====
Sheet B	1	2	3	4	5	6	7	8	9	10	Final
Saskatchewan (Kelln)	0	0	0	0	2	0	0	0	1	0	3
Manitoba (Andrews)	0	1	0	0	0	0	0	3	0	1	5

Sheet D	1	2	3	4	5	6	7	8	9	10	11	Final
Northern Ontario (Lang)	0	0	1	0	0	3	0	0	0	1	0	5
Newfoundland and Labrador (Buckle)	0	0	0	1	0	0	1	3	0	0	1	6

Sheet F	1	2	3	4	5	6	7	8	9	10	Final
Yukon/Northwest Territories (Hunter)	0	1	1	0	0	1	0	1	0	X	4
Quebec (Pare)	0	0	0	3	1	0	2	0	1	X	7

==== Draw 3 ====
Sheet A	1	2	3	4	5	6	7	8	9	10	Final
Nova Scotia (Ogden)	3	0	3	2	1	X	X	X	X	X	9
Alberta (Reed)	0	1	0	0	0	X	X	X	X	X	1

Sheet C	1	2	3	4	5	6	7	8	9	10	Final
Prince Edward Island (MacFadyen)	1	0	1	1	1	0	2	0	2	X	8
Ontario (Turcotte)	0	1	0	0	0	2	0	1	0	X	4

Sheet E	1	2	3	4	5	6	7	8	9	10	Final
British Columbia (Watson)	1	0	2	0	0	0	0	0	3	2	8
New Brunswick (Sullivan)	0	2	0	1	0	0	1	1	0	0	5

==== Draw 4 ====
Sheet A	1	2	3	4	5	6	7	8	9	10	Final
Newfoundland and Labrador (Buckle)	0	2	0	1	0	1	0	2	0	1	7
Quebec (Pare)	0	0	1	0	1	0	2	0	1	0	5

Sheet C	1	2	3	4	5	6	7	8	9	10	Final
Saskatchewan (Kelln)	1	0	0	4	0	2	0	3	X	X	10
Yukon/Northwest Territories (Hunter)	0	1	2	0	3	0	0	0	X	X	6

Sheet E	1	2	3	4	5	6	7	8	9	10	Final
Manitoba (Andrews)	0	0	0	1	0	3	0	1	3	X	8
Northern Ontario (Lang)	1	0	0	0	1	0	1	0	0	X	3

==== Draw 5 ====
Sheet B	1	2	3	4	5	6	7	8	9	10	Final
Quebec (Pare)	1	1	1	0	1	1	0	3	0	X	8
Saskatchewan (Kelln)	0	0	0	2	0	0	1	0	2	X	5

Sheet D	1	2	3	4	5	6	7	8	9	10	Final
Yukon/Northwest Territories (Hunter)	0	1	2	1	2	0	0	0	2	1	9
Northern Ontario (Lang)	1	0	0	0	0	1	1	2	0	0	5

Sheet F	1	2	3	4	5	6	7	8	9	10	Final
Newfoundland and Labrador (Buckle)	0	0	0	0	2	1	1	0	3	X	7
Manitoba (Andrews)	0	0	0	0	0	0	0	2	0	X	2

==== Draw 6 ====
Sheet B	1	2	3	4	5	6	7	8	9	10	Final
Alberta (Reed)	0	2	0	3	0	3	5	X	X	X	13
Prince Edward Island (MacFadyen)	0	0	2	0	1	0	0	X	X	X	3

Sheet D	1	2	3	4	5	6	7	8	9	10	Final
Nova Scotia (Ogden)	3	0	0	2	0	0	0	2	0	1	8
British Columbia (Watson)	0	2	2	0	0	1	0	0	2	0	7

Sheet F	1	2	3	4	5	6	7	8	9	10	Final
Ontario (Turcotte)	1	0	0	1	0	0	1	0	2	1	6
New Brunswick (Sullivan)	0	2	1	0	0	1	0	1	0	0	5

==== Draw 7 ====
Sheet A	1	2	3	4	5	6	7	8	9	10	Final
Manitoba (Andrews)	1	0	2	3	0	0	0	4	1	X	11
Yukon/Northwest Territories (Hunter)	0	1	0	0	2	1	1	0	0	X	5

Sheet C	1	2	3	4	5	6	7	8	9	10	Final
Northern Ontario (Lang)	0	2	0	0	0	1	1	0	2	0	6
Quebec (Pare)	0	0	1	2	1	0	0	1	0	2	7

Sheet E	1	2	3	4	5	6	7	8	9	10	Final
Saskatchewan (Kelln)	0	0	1	0	0	2	1	0	0	1	5
Newfoundland and Labrador (Buckle)	0	0	0	0	1	0	0	1	2	0	4

==== Draw 8 ====
Sheet A	1	2	3	4	5	6	7	8	9	10	Final
British Columbia (Watson)	0	0	0	1	1	0	0	1	0	X	3
Ontario (Turcotte)	0	1	3	0	0	3	0	0	1	X	8

Sheet C	1	2	3	4	5	6	7	8	9	10	Final
Prince Edward Island (MacFadyen)	1	0	0	0	2	0	4	0	2	1	10
Nova Scotia (Ogden)	0	1	1	3	0	1	0	5	0	0	11

Sheet E	1	2	3	4	5	6	7	8	9	10	Final
New Brunswick (Sullivan)	1	0	1	1	0	1	1	0	0	0	5
Alberta (Reed)	0	2	0	0	2	0	0	2	0	1	7

==== Draw 9 ====
Sheet A	1	2	3	4	5	6	7	8	9	10	Final
New Brunswick (Sullivan)	1	0	0	0	0	3	0	2	0	X	6
Prince Edward Island (MacFadyen)	0	1	1	1	1	0	3	0	1	X	8

Sheet C	1	2	3	4	5	6	7	8	9	10	Final
Alberta (Reed)	0	0	1	0	2	0	1	2	0	X	6
British Columbia (Watson)	0	0	0	1	0	1	0	0	2	X	4

Sheet E	1	2	3	4	5	6	7	8	9	10	11	Final
Ontario (Turcotte)	0	0	0	4	1	0	1	0	2	0	1	9
Nova Scotia (Ogden)	0	1	2	0	0	2	0	1	0	2	0	8

==== Draw 10 ====
Sheet B	1	2	3	4	5	6	7	8	9	10	Final
Northern Ontario (Lang)	0	0	2	1	0	1	0	2	0	1	7
Saskatchewan (Kelln)	0	0	0	0	2	0	1	0	2	0	5

Sheet C	1	2	3	4	5	6	7	8	9	10	11	Final
Quebec (Pare)	0	1	0	1	0	0	1	0	2	0	2	7
Manitoba (Andrews)	1	0	0	0	1	1	0	1	0	1	0	5

Sheet E	1	2	3	4	5	6	7	8	9	10	Final
Yukon/Northwest Territories (Hunter)	1	0	0	0	1	0	1	0	1	0	4
Newfoundland and Labrador (Buckle)	0	2	0	0	0	1	0	0	0	2	5

==== Draw 11 ====
Sheet A	1	2	3	4	5	6	7	8	9	10	Final
New Brunswick (Sullivan)	0	2	4	0	1	1	X	X	X	X	8
Saskatchewan (Kelln)	0	0	0	2	0	0	X	X	X	X	2

Sheet B	1	2	3	4	5	6	7	8	9	10	11	Final
Nova Scotia (Ogden)	0	2	3	0	1	0	1	0	1	0	1	9
Yukon/Northwest Territories (Hunter)	1	0	0	1	0	2	0	1	0	3	0	8

Sheet C	1	2	3	4	5	6	7	8	9	10	11	Final
British Columbia (Watson)	1	0	1	0	2	1	1	0	1	0	1	8
Newfoundland and Labrador (Buckle)	0	1	0	2	0	0	0	1	0	3	0	7

Sheet D	1	2	3	4	5	6	7	8	9	10	Final
Ontario (Turcotte)	4	1	3	0	0	4	X	X	X	X	12
Quebec (Pare)	0	0	0	0	1	0	X	X	X	X	1

Sheet E	1	2	3	4	5	6	7	8	9	10	Final
Prince Edward Island (MacFadyen)	0	1	0	2	0	2	0	1	0	1	7
Manitoba (Andrews)	0	0	1	0	2	0	1	0	1	0	5

Sheet F	1	2	3	4	5	6	7	8	9	10	Final
Alberta (Reed)	1	0	0	1	0	0	3	0	2	X	7
Northern Ontario (Lang)	0	0	0	0	2	2	0	1	0	X	5

==== Draw 13 ====
Sheet A	1	2	3	4	5	6	7	8	9	10	Final
Yukon/Northwest Territories (Hunter)	2	1	0	0	1	1	0	2	0	X	7
Ontario (Turcotte)	0	0	3	0	0	0	1	0	2	X	6

Sheet B	1	2	3	4	5	6	7	8	9	10	Final
Saskatchewan (Kelln)	1	0	0	1	0	1	0	2	0	X	5
Prince Edward Island (MacFadyen)	0	2	1	0	1	0	1	0	2	X	7

Sheet C	1	2	3	4	5	6	7	8	9	10	11	Final
Northern Ontario (Lang)	0	2	0	0	2	0	2	0	1	0	0	7
New Brunswick (Sullivan)	0	0	0	1	0	2	0	2	0	2	1	8

Sheet D	1	2	3	4	5	6	7	8	9	10	Final
Newfoundland and Labrador (Buckle)	3	0	0	3	0	1	0	3	0	0	10
Nova Scotia (Ogden)	0	2	1	0	1	0	1	0	3	1	9

Sheet E	1	2	3	4	5	6	7	8	9	10	Final
Quebec (Pare)	1	0	0	1	0	0	X	X	X	X	2
Alberta (Reed)	0	0	5	0	2	1	X	X	X	X	8

Sheet F	1	2	3	4	5	6	7	8	9	10	Final
Manitoba (Andrews)	0	0	0	0	1	0	0	1	0	X	2
British Columbia (Watson)	1	0	0	1	0	0	2	0	1	X	5

==== Draw 15 ====
Sheet A	1	2	3	4	5	6	7	8	9	10	Final
Manitoba (Andrews)	2	0	0	1	0	3	0	3	0	1	10
Alberta (Reed)	0	1	2	0	1	0	1	0	1	0	6

Sheet B	1	2	3	4	5	6	7	8	9	10	Final
Quebec (Pare)	0	0	0	1	0	0	2	1	0	0	4
British Columbia (Watson)	0	0	0	0	0	1	0	0	1	1	3

Sheet C	1	2	3	4	5	6	7	8	9	10	Final
Saskatchewan (Kelln)	1	0	0	0	0	1	0	2	0	X	4
Ontario (Turcotte)	0	0	0	1	1	0	1	0	4	X	7

Sheet D	1	2	3	4	5	6	7	8	9	10	Final
Newfoundland and Labrador (Buckle)	0	1	1	1	0	0	1	0	0	1	5
New Brunswick (Sullivan)	0	0	0	0	1	1	0	1	1	0	4

Sheet E	1	2	3	4	5	6	7	8	9	10	Final
Northern Ontario (Lang)	2	3	0	0	4	0	X	X	X	X	9
Nova Scotia (Ogden)	0	0	1	2	0	1	X	X	X	X	4

Sheet F	1	2	3	4	5	6	7	8	9	10	Final
Yukon/Northwest Territories (Hunter)	1	0	1	2	0	0	2	0	0	X	6
Prince Edward Island (MacFadyen)	0	3	0	0	1	1	0	3	1	X	9

==== Draw 17 ====
Sheet A	1	2	3	4	5	6	7	8	9	10	Final
British Columbia (Watson)	1	2	0	4	0	0	0	4	X	X	11
Northern Ontario (Lang)	0	0	2	0	3	0	0	0	X	X	5

Sheet B	1	2	3	4	5	6	7	8	9	10	Final
New Brunswick (Sullivan)	0	2	1	1	2	1	1	2	X	X	10
Yukon/Northwest Territories (Hunter)	2	0	0	0	0	0	0	0	X	X	2

Sheet C	1	2	3	4	5	6	7	8	9	10	11	Final
Alberta (Reed)	1	0	0	1	0	1	1	0	1	0	0	5
Newfoundland and Labrador (Buckle)	0	0	1	0	1	0	0	1	0	2	1	6

Sheet D	1	2	3	4	5	6	7	8	9	10	Final
Ontario (Turcotte)	0	1	0	1	0	0	1	0	0	X	3
Manitoba (Andrews)	0	0	1	0	1	1	0	3	1	X	7

Sheet E	1	2	3	4	5	6	7	8	9	10	Final
Prince Edward Island (MacFadyen)	0	0	0	1	0	2	0	0	3	0	6
Quebec (Pare)	0	1	1	0	2	0	0	1	0	2	7

Sheet F	1	2	3	4	5	6	7	8	9	10	Final
Nova Scotia (Ogden)	1	1	1	0	2	0	0	0	1	1	7
Saskatchewan (Kelln)	0	0	0	1	0	1	1	1	0	0	4

==== Draw 19 ====
Sheet A	1	2	3	4	5	6	7	8	9	10	Final
Prince Edward Island (MacFadyen)	0	2	0	1	0	0	1	0	0	X	4
Newfoundland and Labrador (Buckle)	1	0	1	0	3	1	0	0	1	X	7

Sheet B	1	2	3	4	5	6	7	8	9	10	Final
Ontario (Turcotte)	1	0	0	0	1	1	0	0	X	X	3
Northern Ontario (Lang)	0	0	2	2	0	0	4	1	X	X	9

Sheet C	1	2	3	4	5	6	7	8	9	10	Final
Nova Scotia (Ogden)	1	0	1	0	0	1	1	0	1	0	5
Manitoba (Andrews)	0	3	0	1	1	0	0	3	0	1	9

Sheet D	1	2	3	4	5	6	7	8	9	10	Final
Alberta (Reed)	0	2	0	0	2	1	0	2	1	X	8
Saskatchewan (Kelln)	1	0	0	1	0	0	2	0	0	X	4

Sheet E	1	2	3	4	5	6	7	8	9	10	Final
British Columbia (Watson)	1	0	0	2	0	3	2	X	X	X	8
Yukon/Northwest Territories (Hunter)	0	1	0	0	1	0	0	X	X	X	2

Sheet F	1	2	3	4	5	6	7	8	9	10	Final
New Brunswick (Sullivan)	0	1	2	1	0	0	1	0	1	0	6
Quebec (Pare)	2	0	0	0	0	2	0	2	0	2	8

==== Draw 21 ====
Sheet A	1	2	3	4	5	6	7	8	9	10	11	Final
Quebec (Pare)	1	0	0	2	0	0	0	2	0	0	0	5
Nova Scotia (Ogden)	0	0	1	0	1	0	2	0	0	1	1	6

Sheet B	1	2	3	4	5	6	7	8	9	10	Final
Newfoundland and Labrador (Buckle)	0	1	0	4	1	0	2	0	X	X	8
Ontario (Turcotte)	1	0	3	0	0	6	0	0	X	X	10

Sheet C	1	2	3	4	5	6	7	8	9	10	Final
Manitoba (Andrews)	0	2	0	0	1	0	0	0	1	0	4
New Brunswick (Sullivan)	0	0	2	1	0	0	1	3	0	1	8

Sheet D	1	2	3	4	5	6	7	8	9	10	Final
Yukon/Northwest Territories (Hunter)	0	2	0	1	0	0	2	0	X	X	5
Alberta (Reed)	1	0	3	0	3	2	0	2	X	X	11

Sheet E	1	2	3	4	5	6	7	8	9	10	Final
Saskatchewan (Kelln)	2	0	2	1	0	0	2	0	2	X	9
British Columbia (Watson)	0	1	0	0	1	0	0	2	0	X	4

Sheet F	1	2	3	4	5	6	7	8	9	10	Final
Northern Ontario (Lang)	0	2	0	2	0	1	0	3	0	X	8
Prince Edward Island (MacFadyen)	1	0	2	0	1	0	1	0	1	X	6

=== Playoffs ===
Tiebreaker		Semifinal		Final
Quebec	4
Nova Scotia	5	Alberta	8
		Nova Scotia	9
				Nova Scotia	8
				Newfoundland and Labrador	9

==== Tiebreaker ====
Sheet D	1	2	3	4	5	6	7	8	9	10	Final
Quebec (Pare)	0	0	1	1	0	0	0	1	1	X	4
Nova Scotia (Ogden)	0	1	0	0	2	1	1	0	0	X	5

Player percentages
Quebec		Nova Scotia	
Jean-Marie Bouchard	76%	Glenn Josephson	76%
Carol Bellemarre	76%	Rod McCarron	75%
Marcel Bouchard	65%	Tom Fetterly	84%
Rejean Pare	57%	Steve Ogden	76%
Total	69%	Total	78%

==== Semifinal ====
Sheet C	1	2	3	4	5	6	7	8	9	10	11	Final
Alberta (Reed)	2	0	0	1	0	2	0	2	0	1	0	8
Nova Scotia (Ogden)	0	1	1	0	2	0	2	0	2	0	1	9

Player percentages
Alberta		Nova Scotia	
Garry Landry	89%	Glenn Josephson	83%
Fred McKenzie	73%	Rod McCarron	73%
Warren Kushnir	75%	Tom Fetterly	72%
Tom Reed	70%	Steve Ogden	83%
Total	77%	Total	78%

==== Final ====
Sheet C	1	2	3	4	5	6	7	8	9	10	11	Final
Nova Scotia (Ogden)	0	1	0	2	0	0	2	1	0	2	0	8
Newfoundland and Labrador (Buckle)	1	0	1	0	1	2	0	0	3	0	1	9

Player percentages
Nova Scotia		Newfoundland and Labrador	
Glenn Josephson	85%	Harvey Holloway	73%
Rod McCarron	82%	Gerry Young	80%
Tom Fetterly	78%	Bob Freeman	84%
Steve Ogden	76%	Bas Buckle	77%
Total	80%	Total	78%

== Women's ==
=== Teams ===
Province / Territory	Skip	Third	Second	Lead
British Columbia	Kathy Smiley	Rita Imai	Donna Giles	Sue Teleske
Alberta	Kathy Odegard	Marilyn Johnston	Dolene Fesyk	Faye Smith
Saskatchewan	Crystal Frisk	Anita Ford	Randi Kelly	Dawne Obleman
Manitoba	Joyce McDougall	Helen Fenwick	Pam Horn	Karen Dunbar
Northern Ontario	Maymar Gemmell	Jan Pula	Brenda Johnston	Bev Jarrett
Ontario	Anne Dunn	Lindy Marchuk	Gloria Campbell	Fran Todd
Quebec	Rolande Madore	Ruth Lavoie	France Prevost	Denyse Fortier
New Brunswick	Marlene Vaughan	Mona Train	Rose Donovan	Jeannine Tucker
Nova Scotia	Sue Anne Bartlett	Penny LaRocque	Karen Hennigar	Jane Brett
Prince Edward Island	Shirley Berry	Arleen Harris	Linda Fairhurst	Karen McIntee
Newfoundland and Labrador	Jean Rockwell	Diane Keating	Pat Spracklin	Julie Vardy
Northwest Territories/Yukon	Lynda Koe	Juliane Hamer	Louise Marcinkoski	Lynne Green

=== Standings ===
Locale	Skip	W	L
Ontario	Anne Dunn	11	0
British Columbia	Kathy Smiley	8	3
Alberta	Kathy Odegard	8	3
Nova Scotia	Sue Anne Bartlett	7	4
Quebec	Rolande Madore	7	4
Saskatchewan	Crystal Frisk	6	5
Manitoba	Joyce McDougall	6	5
Northern Ontario	Maymar Gemmell	4	7
Prince Edward Island	Shirley Berry	4	7
New Brunswick	Marlene Vaughan	4	7
Newfoundland and Labrador	Jean Rockwell	1	10
Northwest Territories/Yukon	Lynda Koe	0	11

=== Results ===
==== Draw 1 ====
Sheet A	1	2	3	4	5	6	7	8	9	10	Final
Prince Edward Island (Berry)	2	0	3	0	2	1	4	2	X	X	14
Northwest Territories/Yukon (Koe)	0	2	0	2	0	0	0	0	X	X	4

Sheet C	1	2	3	4	5	6	7	8	9	10	Final
Ontario (Dunn)	1	0	0	0	1	0	0	1	0	3	6
Manitoba (McDougall)	0	1	0	1	0	0	1	0	2	0	5

Sheet E	1	2	3	4	5	6	7	8	9	10	Final
Alberta (Odegard)	2	0	3	0	1	0	1	0	1	X	8
Quebec (Madore)	0	1	0	1	0	1	0	1	0	X	4

==== Draw 2 ====
Sheet A	1	2	3	4	5	6	7	8	9	10	Final
New Brunswick (Vaughan)	0	0	0	0	2	1	0	0	1	X	4
Northern Ontario (Gemmell)	0	1	3	2	0	0	2	1	0	X	9

Sheet C	1	2	3	4	5	6	7	8	9	10	Final
Newfoundland and Labrador (Rockwell)	0	1	0	0	1	0	0	0	1	X	3
Saskatchewan (Frisk)	2	0	1	1	0	0	1	3	0	X	8

Sheet E	1	2	3	4	5	6	7	8	9	10	Final
British Columbia (Smiley)	0	1	0	3	1	0	1	0	0	1	7
Nova Scotia (Bartlett)	0	0	2	0	0	2	0	1	1	0	6

==== Draw 3 ====
Sheet B	1	2	3	4	5	6	7	8	9	10	Final
Ontario (Dunn)	2	0	0	1	0	2	0	1	0	1	7
Alberta (Odegard)	0	1	0	0	1	0	1	0	2	0	5

Sheet D	1	2	3	4	5	6	7	8	9	10	Final
Manitoba (McDougall)	2	1	3	0	3	4	X	X	X	X	13
Prince Edward Island (Berry)	0	0	0	1	0	0	X	X	X	X	1

Sheet F	1	2	3	4	5	6	7	8	9	10	Final
Northwest Territories/Yukon (Koe)	1	0	2	0	2	0	1	0	0	X	6
Quebec (Madore)	0	3	0	1	0	2	0	4	2	X	12

==== Draw 4 ====
Sheet B	1	2	3	4	5	6	7	8	9	10	Final
New Brunswick (Vaughan)	2	0	0	1	1	0	4	1	0	X	9
British Columbia (Smiley)	0	1	1	0	0	1	0	0	2	X	5

Sheet D	1	2	3	4	5	6	7	8	9	10	Final
Northern Ontario (Gemmell)	2	0	2	1	0	3	1	2	X	X	11
Newfoundland and Labrador (Rockwell)	0	1	0	0	2	0	0	0	X	X	3

Sheet F	1	2	3	4	5	6	7	8	9	10	Final
Saskatchewan (Frisk)	1	0	2	1	0	0	0	0	0	X	4
Nova Scotia (Bartlett)	0	2	0	0	1	1	1	2	3	X	10

==== Draw 5 ====
Sheet A	1	2	3	4	5	6	7	8	9	10	Final
Nova Scotia (Bartlett)	3	0	0	2	0	0	0	4	1	X	10
New Brunswick (Vaughan)	0	1	1	0	1	0	1	0	0	X	4

Sheet C	1	2	3	4	5	6	7	8	9	10	Final
British Columbia (Smiley)	0	3	3	0	2	0	1	0	1	X	10
Newfoundland and Labrador (Rockwell)	2	0	0	2	0	2	0	1	0	X	7

Sheet E	1	2	3	4	5	6	7	8	9	10	Final
Saskatchewan (Frisk)	3	0	1	1	1	6	X	X	X	X	12
Northern Ontario (Gemmell)	0	1	0	0	0	0	X	X	X	X	1

==== Draw 6 ====
Sheet A	1	2	3	4	5	6	7	8	9	10	Final
Quebec (Madore)	2	0	2	0	1	0	1	0	0	0	6
Ontario (Dunn)	0	1	0	1	0	1	0	1	2	1	7

Sheet C	1	2	3	4	5	6	7	8	9	10	Final
Northwest Territories/Yukon (Koe)	1	1	0	0	0	1	0	1	1	0	5
Manitoba (McDougall)	0	0	1	1	2	0	1	0	0	1	6

Sheet E	1	2	3	4	5	6	7	8	9	10	Final
Alberta (Odegard)	2	1	1	0	0	2	0	0	3	1	10
Prince Edward Island (Berry)	0	0	0	4	1	0	2	1	0	0	8

==== Draw 7 ====
Sheet B	1	2	3	4	5	6	7	8	9	10	Final
Newfoundland and Labrador (Rockwell)	0	0	2	0	0	1	0	1	0	X	4
Nova Scotia (Bartlett)	2	0	0	2	2	0	1	0	2	X	9

Sheet D	1	2	3	4	5	6	7	8	9	10	Final
New Brunswick (Vaughan)	0	0	0	1	0	2	2	1	0	1	7
Saskatchewan (Frisk)	1	0	0	0	2	0	0	0	2	0	5

Sheet F	1	2	3	4	5	6	7	8	9	10	Final
Northern Ontario (Gemmell)	0	1	0	1	0	0	2	0	2	0	6
British Columbia (Smiley)	0	0	2	0	1	1	0	2	0	3	9

==== Draw 8 ====
Sheet B	1	2	3	4	5	6	7	8	9	10	Final
Ontario (Dunn)	0	3	2	2	1	1	X	X	X	X	9
Northwest Territories/Yukon (Koe)	2	0	0	0	0	0	X	X	X	X	2

Sheet D	1	2	3	4	5	6	7	8	9	10	Final
Prince Edward Island (Berry)	1	0	0	1	0	1	0	0	X	X	3
Quebec (Madore)	0	3	1	0	2	0	2	2	X	X	10

Sheet F	1	2	3	4	5	6	7	8	9	10	Final
Manitoba (McDougall)	0	1	0	0	0	0	1	0	1	0	3
Alberta (Odegard)	0	0	1	0	0	0	0	1	0	2	4

==== Draw 9 ====
Sheet B	1	2	3	4	5	6	7	8	9	10	Final
Quebec (Madore)	0	1	0	1	1	1	1	0	1	X	6
Manitoba (McDougall)	1	0	0	0	0	0	0	1	0	X	2

Sheet D	1	2	3	4	5	6	7	8	9	10	Final
Alberta (Odegard)	3	0	1	1	2	1	1	X	X	X	9
Northwest Territories/Yukon (Koe)	0	1	0	0	0	0	0	X	X	X	1

Sheet F	1	2	3	4	5	6	7	8	9	10	Final
Prince Edward Island (Berry)	1	0	0	0	0	0	0	0	2	1	4
Ontario (Dunn)	0	0	2	0	0	1	1	1	0	0	5

==== Draw 10 ====
Sheet A	1	2	3	4	5	6	7	8	9	10	Final
Nova Scotia (Bartlett)	1	1	2	2	0	1	0	0	1	X	8
Northern Ontario (Gemmell)	0	0	0	0	1	0	2	1	0	X	4

Sheet D	1	2	3	4	5	6	7	8	9	10	Final
British Columbia (Smiley)	3	0	0	0	1	0	0	2	1	1	8
Saskatchewan (Frisk)	0	1	1	1	0	2	0	0	0	0	5

Sheet F	1	2	3	4	5	6	7	8	9	10	Final
Newfoundland and Labrador (Rockwell)	0	0	0	1	0	X	X	X	X	X	1
New Brunswick (Vaughan)	0	5	3	0	3	X	X	X	X	X	11

==== Draw 12 ====
Sheet A	1	2	3	4	5	6	7	8	9	10	Final
Northwest Territories/Yukon (Koe)	0	1	2	0	2	0	1	0	0	0	6
British Columbia (Smiley)	3	0	0	1	0	2	0	0	2	1	9

Sheet B	1	2	3	4	5	6	7	8	9	10	Final
Manitoba (McDougall)	2	0	0	1	0	0	0	2	0	2	7
Saskatchewan (Frisk)	0	2	0	0	2	2	1	0	1	0	8

Sheet C	1	2	3	4	5	6	7	8	9	10	Final
Alberta (Odegard)	2	2	0	0	1	0	1	2	X	X	8
Nova Scotia (Bartlett)	0	0	1	0	0	1	0	0	X	X	2

Sheet D	1	2	3	4	5	6	7	8	9	10	Final
Ontario (Dunn)	2	0	2	0	0	1	0	2	2	X	9
Northern Ontario (Gemmell)	0	1	0	0	1	0	2	0	0	X	4

Sheet E	1	2	3	4	5	6	7	8	9	10	Final
Quebec (Madore)	0	3	1	0	0	2	0	2	0	2	10
Newfoundland and Labrador (Rockwell)	1	0	0	0	3	0	2	0	3	0	9

Sheet F	1	2	3	4	5	6	7	8	9	10	Final
Prince Edward Island (Berry)	1	2	0	0	2	0	1	1	2	X	8
New Brunswick (Vaughan)	0	0	1	1	0	1	0	0	0	X	3

==== Draw 14 ====
Sheet A	1	2	3	4	5	6	7	8	9	10	Final
New Brunswick (Vaughan)	1	0	0	1	0	1	0	2	0	X	5
Ontario (Dunn)	0	1	1	0	4	0	1	0	5	X	12

Sheet B	1	2	3	4	5	6	7	8	9	10	Final
Newfoundland and Labrador (Rockwell)	0	0	1	0	2	0	X	X	X	X	3
Prince Edward Island (Berry)	2	1	0	4	0	4	X	X	X	X	11

Sheet C	1	2	3	4	5	6	7	8	9	10	Final
Saskatchewan (Frisk)	3	1	3	1	1	2	X	X	X	X	11
Northwest Territories/Yukon (Koe)	0	0	0	0	0	0	X	X	X	X	0

Sheet D	1	2	3	4	5	6	7	8	9	10	Final
Nova Scotia (Bartlett)	2	0	1	0	0	2	0	0	0	2	7
Quebec (Madore)	0	2	0	0	1	0	1	1	1	0	6

Sheet E	1	2	3	4	5	6	7	8	9	10	Final
Northern Ontario (Gemmell)	0	2	0	1	1	0	1	0	0	0	5
Manitoba (McDougall)	0	0	1	0	0	1	0	1	2	1	6

Sheet F	1	2	3	4	5	6	7	8	9	10	Final
British Columbia (Smiley)	2	0	0	2	0	0	0	1	2	X	7
Alberta (Odegard)	0	2	0	0	0	1	1	0	0	X	4

==== Draw 16 ====
Sheet A	1	2	3	4	5	6	7	8	9	10	Final
Prince Edward Island (Berry)	2	0	0	3	3	1	0	2	X	X	11
British Columbia (Smiley)	0	2	1	0	0	0	2	0	X	X	5

Sheet B	1	2	3	4	5	6	7	8	9	10	Final
Quebec (Madore)	0	2	1	0	0	3	4	2	X	X	12
Saskatchewan (Frisk)	0	0	0	1	1	0	0	0	X	X	2

Sheet C	1	2	3	4	5	6	7	8	9	10	Final
Alberta (Odegard)	1	0	6	0	0	1	0	2	2	X	12
Northern Ontario (Gemmell)	0	1	0	1	1	0	3	0	0	X	6

Sheet D	1	2	3	4	5	6	7	8	9	10	Final
Ontario (Dunn)	0	3	0	1	4	0	2	X	X	X	10
Nova Scotia (Bartlett)	0	0	1	0	0	2	0	X	X	X	3

Sheet E	1	2	3	4	5	6	7	8	9	10	Final
Northwest Territories/Yukon (Koe)	1	0	2	0	1	0	0	1	0	X	5
New Brunswick (Vaughan)	0	1	0	3	0	0	1	0	3	X	8

Sheet F	1	2	3	4	5	6	7	8	9	10	Final
Manitoba (McDougall)	3	2	3	1	0	1	0	X	X	X	10
Newfoundland and Labrador (Rockwell)	0	0	0	0	1	0	1	X	X	X	2

==== Draw 18 ====
Sheet A	1	2	3	4	5	6	7	8	9	10	Final
Alberta (Odegard)	0	3	1	0	0	1	0	2	0	1	8
Newfoundland and Labrador (Rockwell)	2	0	0	2	0	0	1	0	2	0	7

Sheet B	1	2	3	4	5	6	7	8	9	10	Final
Northwest Territories/Yukon (Koe)	1	0	2	0	0	0	2	1	1	X	7
Northern Ontario (Gemmell)	0	1	0	1	1	5	0	0	0	X	8

Sheet C	1	2	3	4	5	6	7	8	9	10	Final
Quebec (Madore)	2	0	3	0	1	0	2	0	1	1	10
New Brunswick (Vaughan)	0	3	0	2	0	2	0	1	0	0	8

Sheet D	1	2	3	4	5	6	7	8	9	10	Final
Manitoba (McDougall)	0	2	0	0	1	0	0	1	2	0	6
British Columbia (Smiley)	0	0	2	3	0	2	1	0	0	1	9

Sheet E	1	2	3	4	5	6	7	8	9	10	Final
Prince Edward Island (Berry)	0	0	1	0	1	0	0	X	X	X	2
Nova Scotia (Bartlett)	1	1	0	3	0	3	1	X	X	X	9

Sheet F	1	2	3	4	5	6	7	8	9	10	Final
Ontario (Dunn)	0	0	1	0	1	0	1	1	0	1	5
Saskatchewan (Frisk)	2	0	0	1	0	0	0	0	1	0	4

==== Draw 20 ====
Sheet A	1	2	3	4	5	6	7	8	9	10	Final
Nova Scotia (Bartlett)	1	0	0	0	0	1	0	2	0	X	4
Manitoba (McDougall)	0	1	2	0	1	0	3	0	2	X	9

Sheet B	1	2	3	4	5	6	7	8	9	10	Final
New Brunswick (Vaughan)	0	0	1	0	1	0	1	0	0	X	3
Alberta (Odegard)	0	3	0	1	0	1	0	2	2	X	9

Sheet C	1	2	3	4	5	6	7	8	9	10	Final
Saskatchewan (Frisk)	0	0	2	1	1	0	1	1	1	X	7
Prince Edward Island (Berry)	0	3	0	0	0	1	0	0	0	X	4

Sheet D	1	2	3	4	5	6	7	8	9	10	Final
Newfoundland and Labrador (Rockwell)	0	2	1	0	2	0	1	2	0	2	10
Northwest Territories/Yukon (Koe)	0	0	0	4	0	4	0	0	1	0	9

Sheet E	1	2	3	4	5	6	7	8	9	10	Final
British Columbia (Smiley)	1	0	0	2	0	0	0	0	2	0	5
Ontario (Dunn)	0	1	2	0	2	0	0	0	0	1	6

Sheet F	1	2	3	4	5	6	7	8	9	10	11	Final
Northern Ontario (Gemmell)	0	1	1	0	0	1	0	0	1	1	0	5
Quebec (Madore)	1	0	0	0	1	0	2	1	0	0	1	6

==== Draw 22 ====
Sheet A	1	2	3	4	5	6	7	8	9	10	Final
Saskatchewan (Frisk)	0	3	0	0	0	1	0	1	0	3	8
Alberta (Odegard)	1	0	0	2	0	0	1	0	3	0	7

Sheet B	1	2	3	4	5	6	7	8	9	10	Final
Northern Ontario (Gemmell)	2	0	1	2	0	2	0	1	4	X	12
Prince Edward Island (Berry)	0	1	0	0	1	0	2	0	0	X	4

Sheet C	1	2	3	4	5	6	7	8	9	10	11	Final
British Columbia (Smiley)	0	1	0	2	2	0	1	0	1	0	1	8
Quebec (Madore)	0	0	1	0	0	2	0	3	0	1	0	7

Sheet D	1	2	3	4	5	6	7	8	9	10	11	Final
New Brunswick (Vaughan)	0	3	0	2	0	0	1	0	1	2	0	9
Manitoba (McDougall)	1	0	3	0	1	2	0	2	0	0	1	10

Sheet E	1	2	3	4	5	6	7	8	9	10	Final
Newfoundland and Labrador (Rockwell)	0	2	0	1	0	0	0	X	X	X	3
Ontario (Dunn)	2	0	2	0	2	1	2	X	X	X	9

Sheet F	1	2	3	4	5	6	7	8	9	10	Final
Nova Scotia (Bartlett)	1	0	0	3	2	0	0	1	0	1	8
Northwest Territories/Yukon (Koe)	0	1	1	0	0	1	1	0	3	0	7

=== Playoffs ===
Semifinal		Final
Alberta	L
British Columbia	W	Ontario	7
		British Columbia	3

==== Semifinal ====
Team	Final
Alberta (Odegard)	L
British Columbia (Smiley)	W

==== Final ====
Sheet D	1	2	3	4	5	6	7	8	9	10	Final
Ontario (Dunn)	1	1	0	0	2	0	1	0	2	X	7
British Columbia (Smiley)	0	0	0	1	0	1	0	1	0	X	3

Player percentages
Ontario		British Columbia	
Fran Todd	72%	Sue Teleske	81%
Gloria Campbell	86%	Donna Giles	88%
Lindy Marchuk	83%	Rita Imai	80%
Anne Dunn	79%	Kathy Smiley	76%
Total	80%	Total	82%
