= 1983 Scott Tournament of Hearts =

Canadian women's curling championship

- Host city: Prince George, British Columbia
- Arena: Prince George Coliseum
- Dates: February 26–March 5
- Attendance: 17,402
- Winner: Nova Scotia
- Curling club: CFB Halifax CC, Halifax
- Skip: Penny LaRocque
- Third: Sharon Horne
- Second: Cathy Caudle
- Lead: Pamela Sanford
- Finalist: Alberta (Cathy Shaw)

The 1983 Scott Tournament of Hearts, the Canadian women's curling championship, was held from February 26 to March 5, 1983, at the Prince George Coliseum in Prince George, British Columbia. The total attendance for the event was 17,402.

After using a four-team playoff the previous year, the playoff was reverted to a three-team playoff with the round robin winner receiving a direct bye into the final.

Team Nova Scotia, who was skipped by Penny LaRocque won the event by defeating Alberta in the final 5–4. This was Nova Scotia's second consecutive championship and the only title won by LaRocque. As of 2023, LaRocque remains the only skip representing Nova Scotia other than Colleen Jones to win a championship. This is also the first time that either Atlantic or Eastern Canada had won consecutive titles.

LaRocque's rink would go onto represent Canada at the 1983 Pioneer Life World Women's Curling Championship on home soil in Moose Jaw, Saskatchewan where they would lose in the semifinal to Norway.

The third-place finish by Yukon/Northwest Territories would be the best finish ever by the Territories.

== Teams ==
The teams were listed as follows:

| Alberta | British Columbia | Manitoba | New Brunswick |
|---|---|---|---|
| Crestwood CC, Edmonton Skip: Cathy Shaw; Third: Christine Jurgenson (Note: Team Alberta's third, Christine Jurgenson did not play in the tournament as she was sidelined with a viral infection. Lead Penny Ryan and second Sandra Rippel each threw an extra stone while Sandy Joyce of the host Prince George Curling Club was appointed as a designated sweeper.); Second: Sandra Rippel; Lead: Penny Ryan; Sweeper: Sandy Joyce | Richmond WC, Richmond Skip: Heather Kerr; Third: Berniece McCallan (Note: Team British Columbia's lead, Sandy McCubbin did not play in Draw 3 due to a sprained ankle. For that draw, second Sherry Lethbridge and third Berniece McCallan each threw three stones while BC was appointed a designated sweeper.); Second: Sherry Lethbridge; Lead: Sandy McCubbin | Granite CC, Winnipeg Skip: Patti Vande; Third: Carol Dunstone; Second: Iris Armstrong; Lead: Maureen Bonar | Capital WC, Fredericton Skip: Grace Donald; Third: Connie Bothwell-Myers; Second: Carolyn McKay; Lead: Stella Keays |
| Newfoundland | Nova Scotia | Ontario | Prince Edward Island |
| Carol CC, Labrador City Skip: Ruby Crocker; Third: Rene Crocker; Second: Barbara Pinset; Lead: Sandra Brawley | CFB Halifax CC, Halifax Skip: Penny LaRocque; Third: Sharon Horne; Second: Cathy Caudle; Lead: Pamela Sanford | Fort William CC, Thunder Bay Skip: Anne Provo; Third: Lorraine Lang; Second: Marlene Delorenzi; Lead: Valerie Adams | Charlottetown CC, Charlottetown Skip: Kim McLeod; Third: Cathy Dillon; Second: Karen MacDonald; Lead: Kathie Burke |
| Quebec | Saskatchewan | Yukon/Northwest Territories |
| Buckingham CC, Buckingham Skip: Agnes Charette; Third: Linda Raby (Note: Team Quebec's third, Linda Raby missed Draws 2–5 due to blood poisoning from an infected cut in her hand. In those draws, lead Odette Raby and second Guylaine Deschatelets each threw three stones while Quebec was appointed a designated sweeper.); Second: Guylaine Deschatelets; Lead: Odette Raby | Nutana CC, Saskatoon Skip: Sheila Rowan; Third: Jean MacLean; Second: Judy Sefton; Lead: Lillian Martin | Whitehorse CC, Whitehorse Skip: Shelly Bildfell; Third: Elizabeth McCrae; Second: Louise McCrae; Lead: Dale Sanderson |

== Map of teams ==
Provincial Winners

== Round Robin standings ==
Final Round Robin standings

Key
| Teams to Playoffs |

| Team | Skip | W | L | PF | PA | EW | EL | BE | SE | S% |
|---|---|---|---|---|---|---|---|---|---|---|
| Nova Scotia | Penny LaRocque | 8 | 2 | 72 | 47 | 46 | 30 | 6 | 16 | 70% |
| Yukon/Northwest Territories | Shelly Bildfell | 8 | 2 | 72 | 59 | 42 | 38 | 10 | 12 | 64% |
| Alberta | Cathy Shaw | 7 | 3 | 71 | 49 | 44 | 36 | 11 | 16 | 73% |
| Manitoba | Patti Vande | 6 | 4 | 63 | 62 | 42 | 47 | 1 | 11 | 69% |
| British Columbia | Heather Kerr | 6 | 4 | 59 | 55 | 43 | 42 | 5 | 11 | 65% |
| Newfoundland | Ruby Crocker | 4 | 6 | 60 | 69 | 37 | 43 | 9 | 7 | 62% |
| Ontario | Anne Provo | 4 | 6 | 56 | 58 | 40 | 38 | 6 | 14 | 66% |
| Prince Edward Island | Kim McLeod | 4 | 6 | 51 | 74 | 42 | 44 | 3 | 12 | 63% |
| Quebec | Agnes Charette | 4 | 6 | 69 | 65 | 41 | 39 | 5 | 11 | 64% |
| Saskatchewan | Sheila Rowan | 4 | 6 | 63 | 68 | 43 | 45 | 2 | 15 | 65% |
| New Brunswick | Grace Donald | 0 | 10 | 52 | 82 | 32 | 50 | 3 | 3 | 62% |

== Round Robin results ==
=== Draw 1 ===
| Sheet A | 1 | 2 | 3 | 4 | 5 | 6 | 7 | 8 | 9 | 10 | Final |
|---|---|---|---|---|---|---|---|---|---|---|---|
| New Brunswick (Donald) | 0 | 0 | 0 | 1 | 0 | 0 | 1 | 0 | 1 | X | 3 |
| Yukon/Northwest Territories (Bildfell) 🔨 | 0 | 0 | 2 | 0 | 0 | 1 | 0 | 2 | 0 | X | 5 |

| Sheet B | 1 | 2 | 3 | 4 | 5 | 6 | 7 | 8 | 9 | 10 | Final |
|---|---|---|---|---|---|---|---|---|---|---|---|
| British Columbia (Kerr) | 0 | 0 | 0 | 1 | 0 | 2 | 0 | 0 | 1 | 1 | 5 |
| Alberta (Shaw) 🔨 | 0 | 1 | 0 | 0 | 1 | 0 | 1 | 1 | 0 | 0 | 4 |

| Sheet C | 1 | 2 | 3 | 4 | 5 | 6 | 7 | 8 | 9 | 10 | Final |
|---|---|---|---|---|---|---|---|---|---|---|---|
| Saskatchewan (Rowan) | 2 | 0 | 1 | 0 | 0 | 0 | 0 | 0 | 1 | X | 4 |
| Ontario (Provo) 🔨 | 0 | 1 | 0 | 0 | 0 | 2 | 1 | 1 | 0 | X | 5 |

| Sheet D | 1 | 2 | 3 | 4 | 5 | 6 | 7 | 8 | 9 | 10 | Final |
|---|---|---|---|---|---|---|---|---|---|---|---|
| Newfoundland (Crocker) 🔨 | 0 | 2 | 0 | 3 | 0 | 0 | 1 | 1 | 0 | X | 7 |
| Quebec (Charette) | 0 | 0 | 1 | 0 | 1 | 2 | 0 | 0 | 1 | X | 5 |

| Sheet E | 1 | 2 | 3 | 4 | 5 | 6 | 7 | 8 | 9 | 10 | Final |
|---|---|---|---|---|---|---|---|---|---|---|---|
| Manitoba (Vande) | 0 | 1 | 0 | 1 | 0 | 0 | 2 | 0 | 0 | X | 4 |
| Nova Scotia (LaRocque) 🔨 | 0 | 0 | 3 | 0 | 0 | 1 | 0 | 2 | 2 | X | 8 |

=== Draw 2 ===
| Sheet A | 1 | 2 | 3 | 4 | 5 | 6 | 7 | 8 | 9 | 10 | Final |
|---|---|---|---|---|---|---|---|---|---|---|---|
| Ontario (Provo) 🔨 | 1 | 0 | 1 | 0 | 0 | 1 | 1 | 1 | 0 | X | 5 |
| Quebec (Charette) | 0 | 4 | 0 | 0 | 1 | 0 | 0 | 0 | 3 | X | 8 |

| Sheet B | 1 | 2 | 3 | 4 | 5 | 6 | 7 | 8 | 9 | 10 | Final |
|---|---|---|---|---|---|---|---|---|---|---|---|
| Manitoba (Vande) 🔨 | 1 | 0 | 1 | 0 | 1 | 1 | 2 | 0 | 0 | 0 | 6 |
| British Columbia (Kerr) | 0 | 1 | 0 | 2 | 0 | 0 | 0 | 1 | 1 | 0 | 5 |

| Sheet C | 1 | 2 | 3 | 4 | 5 | 6 | 7 | 8 | 9 | 10 | Final |
|---|---|---|---|---|---|---|---|---|---|---|---|
| Yukon/Northwest Territories (Bildfell) 🔨 | 0 | 0 | 1 | 0 | 2 | 0 | 0 | 0 | 1 | 0 | 4 |
| Nova Scotia (LaRocque) | 0 | 2 | 0 | 0 | 0 | 0 | 2 | 0 | 0 | 1 | 5 |

| Sheet D | 1 | 2 | 3 | 4 | 5 | 6 | 7 | 8 | 9 | 10 | Final |
|---|---|---|---|---|---|---|---|---|---|---|---|
| New Brunswick (Donald) 🔨 | 0 | 1 | 0 | 2 | 0 | 0 | 0 | 1 | 0 | X | 4 |
| Prince Edward Island (McLeod) | 2 | 0 | 1 | 0 | 1 | 1 | 1 | 0 | 0 | X | 6 |

| Sheet E | 1 | 2 | 3 | 4 | 5 | 6 | 7 | 8 | 9 | 10 | Final |
|---|---|---|---|---|---|---|---|---|---|---|---|
| Saskatchewan (Rowan) 🔨 | 2 | 0 | 1 | 0 | 0 | 0 | 1 | 1 | 0 | 0 | 5 |
| Alberta (Shaw) | 0 | 0 | 0 | 2 | 2 | 1 | 0 | 0 | 1 | 1 | 7 |

=== Draw 3 ===
| Sheet A | 1 | 2 | 3 | 4 | 5 | 6 | 7 | 8 | 9 | 10 | Final |
|---|---|---|---|---|---|---|---|---|---|---|---|
| Nova Scotia (LaRocque) | 3 | 0 | 1 | 0 | 0 | 3 | 0 | 0 | 3 | X | 10 |
| Prince Edward Island (McLeod) 🔨 | 0 | 1 | 0 | 0 | 1 | 0 | 1 | 1 | 0 | X | 4 |

| Sheet B | 1 | 2 | 3 | 4 | 5 | 6 | 7 | 8 | 9 | 10 | Final |
|---|---|---|---|---|---|---|---|---|---|---|---|
| Saskatchewan (Rowan) 🔨 | 1 | 0 | 1 | 1 | 0 | 0 | 1 | 1 | 1 | 1 | 7 |
| Manitoba (Vande) | 0 | 2 | 0 | 0 | 2 | 2 | 0 | 0 | 0 | 0 | 6 |

| Sheet C | 1 | 2 | 3 | 4 | 5 | 6 | 7 | 8 | 9 | 10 | Final |
|---|---|---|---|---|---|---|---|---|---|---|---|
| Quebec (Charette) 🔨 | 1 | 0 | 0 | 0 | 0 | 2 | 0 | 2 | X | X | 5 |
| Alberta (Shaw) | 0 | 2 | 2 | 2 | 2 | 0 | 2 | 0 | X | X | 10 |

| Sheet D | 1 | 2 | 3 | 4 | 5 | 6 | 7 | 8 | 9 | 10 | Final |
|---|---|---|---|---|---|---|---|---|---|---|---|
| Ontario (Provo) | 0 | 0 | 1 | 1 | 0 | 0 | 1 | 0 | 0 | X | 3 |
| Newfoundland (Crocker) 🔨 | 0 | 1 | 0 | 0 | 0 | 3 | 0 | 1 | 1 | X | 6 |

| Sheet E | 1 | 2 | 3 | 4 | 5 | 6 | 7 | 8 | 9 | 10 | Final |
|---|---|---|---|---|---|---|---|---|---|---|---|
| Yukon/Northwest Territories (Bildfell) 🔨 | 1 | 0 | 0 | 0 | 3 | 0 | 1 | 0 | X | X | 5 |
| British Columbia (Kerr) | 0 | 3 | 0 | 3 | 0 | 3 | 0 | 2 | X | X | 11 |

=== Draw 4 ===
| Sheet A | 1 | 2 | 3 | 4 | 5 | 6 | 7 | 8 | 9 | 10 | Final |
|---|---|---|---|---|---|---|---|---|---|---|---|
| Alberta (Shaw) 🔨 | 1 | 0 | 1 | 0 | 0 | 0 | 5 | 1 | 0 | X | 8 |
| Newfoundland (Crocker) | 0 | 1 | 0 | 2 | 0 | 0 | 0 | 0 | 1 | X | 4 |

| Sheet B | 1 | 2 | 3 | 4 | 5 | 6 | 7 | 8 | 9 | 10 | Final |
|---|---|---|---|---|---|---|---|---|---|---|---|
| Yukon/Northwest Territories (Bildfell) 🔨 | 2 | 2 | 0 | 0 | 0 | 3 | 0 | 0 | 0 | 1 | 8 |
| Saskatchewan (Rowan) | 0 | 0 | 1 | 2 | 0 | 0 | 1 | 1 | 2 | 0 | 7 |

| Sheet C | 1 | 2 | 3 | 4 | 5 | 6 | 7 | 8 | 9 | 10 | Final |
|---|---|---|---|---|---|---|---|---|---|---|---|
| Prince Edward Island (McLeod) | 0 | 0 | 0 | 0 | 1 | 0 | 1 | 1 | 1 | X | 4 |
| British Columbia (Kerr) 🔨 | 1 | 2 | 1 | 1 | 0 | 1 | 0 | 0 | 0 | X | 6 |

| Sheet D | 1 | 2 | 3 | 4 | 5 | 6 | 7 | 8 | 9 | 10 | Final |
|---|---|---|---|---|---|---|---|---|---|---|---|
| Nova Scotia (LaRocque) | 0 | 0 | 3 | 1 | 0 | 1 | 1 | 0 | 0 | 1 | 7 |
| New Brunswick (Donald) 🔨 | 0 | 2 | 0 | 0 | 3 | 0 | 0 | 0 | 0 | 0 | 5 |

| Sheet E | 1 | 2 | 3 | 4 | 5 | 6 | 7 | 8 | 9 | 10 | Final |
|---|---|---|---|---|---|---|---|---|---|---|---|
| Quebec (Charette) 🔨 | 0 | 0 | 0 | 0 | 1 | 0 | 1 | 0 | 2 | X | 4 |
| Manitoba (Vande) | 0 | 0 | 1 | 0 | 0 | 1 | 0 | 4 | 0 | X | 6 |

=== Draw 5 ===
| Sheet A | 1 | 2 | 3 | 4 | 5 | 6 | 7 | 8 | 9 | 10 | Final |
|---|---|---|---|---|---|---|---|---|---|---|---|
| British Columbia (Kerr) 🔨 | 1 | 0 | 1 | 0 | 1 | 1 | 1 | 0 | 1 | 1 | 7 |
| New Brunswick (Donald) | 0 | 2 | 0 | 2 | 0 | 0 | 0 | 1 | 0 | 0 | 5 |

| Sheet B | 1 | 2 | 3 | 4 | 5 | 6 | 7 | 8 | 9 | 10 | Final |
|---|---|---|---|---|---|---|---|---|---|---|---|
| Quebec (Charette) 🔨 | 1 | 0 | 0 | 1 | 0 | 1 | 0 | 1 | 2 | 0 | 6 |
| Yukon/Northwest Territories (Bildfell) | 0 | 2 | 0 | 0 | 3 | 0 | 2 | 0 | 0 | 0 | 7 |

| Sheet C | 1 | 2 | 3 | 4 | 5 | 6 | 7 | 8 | 9 | 10 | Final |
|---|---|---|---|---|---|---|---|---|---|---|---|
| Newfoundland (Crocker) 🔨 | 0 | 1 | 1 | 0 | 1 | 0 | 2 | 0 | 0 | 1 | 6 |
| Manitoba (Vande) | 0 | 0 | 0 | 2 | 0 | 2 | 0 | 1 | 2 | 0 | 7 |

| Sheet D | 1 | 2 | 3 | 4 | 5 | 6 | 7 | 8 | 9 | 10 | Final |
|---|---|---|---|---|---|---|---|---|---|---|---|
| Alberta (Shaw) 🔨 | 1 | 0 | 0 | 0 | 0 | 0 | 4 | 1 | 0 | X | 6 |
| Ontario (Provo) | 0 | 1 | 0 | 0 | 0 | 1 | 0 | 0 | 1 | X | 3 |

| Sheet E | 1 | 2 | 3 | 4 | 5 | 6 | 7 | 8 | 9 | 10 | Final |
|---|---|---|---|---|---|---|---|---|---|---|---|
| Prince Edward Island (McLeod) 🔨 | 1 | 0 | 1 | 0 | 1 | 0 | 1 | 1 | 0 | X | 5 |
| Saskatchewan (Rowan) | 0 | 4 | 0 | 2 | 0 | 1 | 0 | 0 | 4 | X | 11 |

=== Draw 6 ===
| Sheet A | 1 | 2 | 3 | 4 | 5 | 6 | 7 | 8 | 9 | 10 | 11 | Final |
|---|---|---|---|---|---|---|---|---|---|---|---|---|
| Manitoba (Vande) 🔨 | 0 | 2 | 0 | 0 | 1 | 0 | 1 | 0 | 3 | 0 | 1 | 8 |
| Ontario (Provo) | 1 | 0 | 2 | 1 | 0 | 1 | 0 | 1 | 0 | 1 | 0 | 7 |

| Sheet B | 1 | 2 | 3 | 4 | 5 | 6 | 7 | 8 | 9 | 10 | Final |
|---|---|---|---|---|---|---|---|---|---|---|---|
| Prince Edward Island (McLeod) 🔨 | 0 | 3 | 0 | 1 | 0 | 3 | 0 | 0 | 2 | X | 9 |
| Quebec (Charette) | 2 | 0 | 1 | 0 | 2 | 0 | 1 | 1 | 0 | X | 7 |

| Sheet C | 1 | 2 | 3 | 4 | 5 | 6 | 7 | 8 | 9 | 10 | 11 | Final |
|---|---|---|---|---|---|---|---|---|---|---|---|---|
| New Brunswick (Donald) 🔨 | 1 | 0 | 3 | 0 | 0 | 2 | 0 | 2 | 0 | 0 | 0 | 8 |
| Saskatchewan (Rowan) | 0 | 3 | 0 | 1 | 1 | 0 | 1 | 0 | 1 | 1 | 1 | 9 |

| Sheet D | 1 | 2 | 3 | 4 | 5 | 6 | 7 | 8 | 9 | 10 | Final |
|---|---|---|---|---|---|---|---|---|---|---|---|
| British Columbia (Kerr) | 0 | 1 | 0 | 0 | 2 | 0 | 2 | 0 | 1 | 0 | 6 |
| Nova Scotia (LaRocque) 🔨 | 2 | 0 | 2 | 1 | 0 | 1 | 0 | 1 | 0 | 1 | 8 |

| Sheet E | 1 | 2 | 3 | 4 | 5 | 6 | 7 | 8 | 9 | 10 | Final |
|---|---|---|---|---|---|---|---|---|---|---|---|
| Newfoundland (Crocker) 🔨 | 3 | 0 | 0 | 0 | 1 | 0 | 0 | 0 | 1 | X | 5 |
| Yukon/Northwest Territories (Bildfell) | 0 | 3 | 1 | 1 | 0 | 1 | 0 | 3 | 0 | X | 9 |

=== Draw 7 ===
| Sheet A | 1 | 2 | 3 | 4 | 5 | 6 | 7 | 8 | 9 | 10 | Final |
|---|---|---|---|---|---|---|---|---|---|---|---|
| Saskatchewan (Rowan) | 0 | 0 | 0 | 0 | 0 | 0 | 1 | 0 | X | X | 1 |
| Nova Scotia (LaRocque) 🔨 | 1 | 1 | 0 | 1 | 1 | 2 | 0 | 1 | X | X | 7 |

| Sheet B | 1 | 2 | 3 | 4 | 5 | 6 | 7 | 8 | 9 | 10 | Final |
|---|---|---|---|---|---|---|---|---|---|---|---|
| Newfoundland (Crocker) | 0 | 0 | 0 | 3 | 0 | 1 | 0 | 1 | 0 | 0 | 5 |
| Prince Edward Island (McLeod) 🔨 | 1 | 0 | 1 | 0 | 1 | 0 | 1 | 0 | 1 | 1 | 6 |

| Sheet C | 1 | 2 | 3 | 4 | 5 | 6 | 7 | 8 | 9 | 10 | Final |
|---|---|---|---|---|---|---|---|---|---|---|---|
| Ontario (Provo) | 1 | 0 | 0 | 1 | 1 | 0 | 0 | 3 | 0 | 0 | 6 |
| Yukon/Northwest Territories (Bildfell) 🔨 | 0 | 1 | 1 | 0 | 0 | 2 | 1 | 0 | 0 | 2 | 7 |

| Sheet D | 1 | 2 | 3 | 4 | 5 | 6 | 7 | 8 | 9 | 10 | Final |
|---|---|---|---|---|---|---|---|---|---|---|---|
| Manitoba (Vande) | 0 | 1 | 0 | 1 | 1 | 0 | 0 | 2 | 0 | 1 | 6 |
| Alberta (Shaw) 🔨 | 1 | 0 | 1 | 0 | 0 | 2 | 1 | 0 | 0 | 0 | 5 |

| Sheet E | 1 | 2 | 3 | 4 | 5 | 6 | 7 | 8 | 9 | 10 | Final |
|---|---|---|---|---|---|---|---|---|---|---|---|
| New Brunswick (Donald) | 0 | 1 | 0 | 0 | 0 | 2 | 0 | 1 | X | X | 4 |
| Quebec (Charette) 🔨 | 1 | 0 | 2 | 2 | 1 | 0 | 5 | 0 | X | X | 11 |

=== Draw 8 ===
| Sheet A | 1 | 2 | 3 | 4 | 5 | 6 | 7 | 8 | 9 | 10 | Final |
|---|---|---|---|---|---|---|---|---|---|---|---|
| Yukon/Northwest Territories (Bildfell) | 0 | 2 | 1 | 0 | 0 | 2 | 0 | 1 | 0 | 2 | 8 |
| Alberta (Shaw) 🔨 | 1 | 0 | 0 | 2 | 0 | 0 | 1 | 0 | 3 | 0 | 7 |

| Sheet B | 1 | 2 | 3 | 4 | 5 | 6 | 7 | 8 | 9 | 10 | Final |
|---|---|---|---|---|---|---|---|---|---|---|---|
| New Brunswick (Donald) 🔨 | 1 | 2 | 0 | 0 | 2 | 0 | 0 | 2 | 0 | X | 7 |
| Newfoundland (Crocker) | 0 | 0 | 0 | 5 | 0 | 3 | 1 | 0 | 1 | X | 10 |

| Sheet C | 1 | 2 | 3 | 4 | 5 | 6 | 7 | 8 | 9 | 10 | Final |
|---|---|---|---|---|---|---|---|---|---|---|---|
| Nova Scotia (LaRocque) 🔨 | 1 | 0 | 0 | 0 | 1 | 0 | 1 | 0 | 3 | X | 6 |
| Quebec (Charette) | 0 | 1 | 0 | 2 | 0 | 2 | 0 | 3 | 0 | X | 7 |

| Sheet D | 1 | 2 | 3 | 4 | 5 | 6 | 7 | 8 | 9 | 10 | 11 | Final |
|---|---|---|---|---|---|---|---|---|---|---|---|---|
| Saskatchewan (Rowan) | 0 | 0 | 1 | 0 | 1 | 1 | 0 | 1 | 0 | 0 | 0 | 4 |
| British Columbia (Kerr) 🔨 | 1 | 0 | 0 | 1 | 0 | 0 | 1 | 0 | 0 | 1 | 2 | 6 |

| Sheet E | 1 | 2 | 3 | 4 | 5 | 6 | 7 | 8 | 9 | 10 | Final |
|---|---|---|---|---|---|---|---|---|---|---|---|
| Ontario (Provo) 🔨 | 3 | 1 | 0 | 0 | 0 | 1 | 0 | 0 | 2 | X | 7 |
| Prince Edward Island (McLeod) | 0 | 0 | 1 | 0 | 1 | 0 | 1 | 1 | 0 | X | 4 |

=== Draw 9 ===
| Sheet A | 1 | 2 | 3 | 4 | 5 | 6 | 7 | 8 | 9 | 10 | Final |
|---|---|---|---|---|---|---|---|---|---|---|---|
| Quebec (Charette) | 0 | 0 | 1 | 0 | 1 | 2 | 0 | 1 | 0 | X | 5 |
| British Columbia (Kerr) 🔨 | 2 | 1 | 0 | 2 | 0 | 0 | 1 | 0 | 1 | X | 7 |

| Sheet B | 1 | 2 | 3 | 4 | 5 | 6 | 7 | 8 | 9 | 10 | Final |
|---|---|---|---|---|---|---|---|---|---|---|---|
| Ontario (Provo) | 0 | 0 | 2 | 0 | 4 | 0 | 0 | 0 | 2 | X | 8 |
| New Brunswick (Donald) 🔨 | 2 | 0 | 0 | 1 | 0 | 1 | 1 | 0 | 0 | X | 5 |

| Sheet C | 1 | 2 | 3 | 4 | 5 | 6 | 7 | 8 | 9 | 10 | Final |
|---|---|---|---|---|---|---|---|---|---|---|---|
| Alberta (Shaw) 🔨 | 1 | 1 | 1 | 1 | 0 | 3 | 0 | 1 | 0 | X | 8 |
| Prince Edward Island (McLeod) | 0 | 0 | 0 | 0 | 1 | 0 | 1 | 0 | 2 | X | 4 |

| Sheet D | 1 | 2 | 3 | 4 | 5 | 6 | 7 | 8 | 9 | 10 | Final |
|---|---|---|---|---|---|---|---|---|---|---|---|
| Yukon/Northwest Territories (Bildfell) 🔨 | 2 | 0 | 1 | 0 | 0 | 3 | 0 | 1 | 0 | 1 | 8 |
| Manitoba (Vande) | 0 | 1 | 0 | 1 | 1 | 0 | 2 | 0 | 1 | 0 | 6 |

| Sheet E | 1 | 2 | 3 | 4 | 5 | 6 | 7 | 8 | 9 | 10 | Final |
|---|---|---|---|---|---|---|---|---|---|---|---|
| Nova Scotia (LaRocque) 🔨 | 1 | 3 | 1 | 0 | 2 | 0 | 0 | 2 | 0 | X | 9 |
| Newfoundland (Crocker) | 0 | 0 | 0 | 2 | 0 | 2 | 0 | 0 | 1 | X | 5 |

=== Draw 10 ===
| Sheet A | 1 | 2 | 3 | 4 | 5 | 6 | 7 | 8 | 9 | 10 | Final |
|---|---|---|---|---|---|---|---|---|---|---|---|
| Prince Edward Island (McLeod) | 0 | 0 | 1 | 0 | 1 | 0 | 1 | 0 | 2 | 1 | 6 |
| Manitoba (Vande) 🔨 | 2 | 0 | 0 | 1 | 0 | 1 | 0 | 1 | 0 | 0 | 5 |

| Sheet B | 1 | 2 | 3 | 4 | 5 | 6 | 7 | 8 | 9 | 10 | Final |
|---|---|---|---|---|---|---|---|---|---|---|---|
| Nova Scotia (LaRocque) | 1 | 0 | 3 | 0 | 2 | 1 | 0 | 1 | 0 | X | 8 |
| Ontario (Provo) 🔨 | 0 | 1 | 0 | 1 | 0 | 0 | 2 | 0 | 0 | X | 4 |

| Sheet C | 1 | 2 | 3 | 4 | 5 | 6 | 7 | 8 | 9 | 10 | Final |
|---|---|---|---|---|---|---|---|---|---|---|---|
| British Columbia (Kerr) 🔨 | 2 | 0 | 0 | 0 | 0 | 1 | 0 | 0 | 1 | X | 4 |
| Newfoundland (Crocker) | 0 | 2 | 0 | 2 | 1 | 0 | 0 | 1 | 0 | X | 6 |

| Sheet D | 1 | 2 | 3 | 4 | 5 | 6 | 7 | 8 | 9 | 10 | Final |
|---|---|---|---|---|---|---|---|---|---|---|---|
| Quebec (Charette) | 2 | 0 | 2 | 0 | 3 | 1 | 2 | 0 | X | X | 10 |
| Saskatchewan (Rowan) 🔨 | 0 | 2 | 0 | 1 | 0 | 0 | 0 | 1 | X | X | 9 |

| Sheet E | 1 | 2 | 3 | 4 | 5 | 6 | 7 | 8 | 9 | 10 | Final |
|---|---|---|---|---|---|---|---|---|---|---|---|
| Alberta (Shaw) 🔨 | 2 | 2 | 2 | 0 | 0 | 1 | 0 | 2 | 1 | X | 10 |
| New Brunswick (Donald) | 0 | 0 | 0 | 3 | 0 | 0 | 2 | 0 | 0 | X | 5 |

=== Draw 11 ===
| Sheet A | 1 | 2 | 3 | 4 | 5 | 6 | 7 | 8 | 9 | 10 | Final |
|---|---|---|---|---|---|---|---|---|---|---|---|
| Newfoundland (Crocker) | 0 | 0 | 2 | 1 | 0 | 2 | 0 | 1 | 0 | 0 | 6 |
| Saskatchewan (Rowan) 🔨 | 2 | 0 | 0 | 0 | 4 | 0 | 1 | 0 | 1 | 3 | 11 |

| Sheet B | 1 | 2 | 3 | 4 | 5 | 6 | 7 | 8 | 9 | 10 | Final |
|---|---|---|---|---|---|---|---|---|---|---|---|
| Alberta (Shaw) 🔨 | 3 | 0 | 1 | 0 | 2 | 0 | 0 | 0 | 0 | X | 6 |
| Nova Scotia (LaRocque) | 0 | 1 | 0 | 1 | 0 | 1 | 1 | 0 | 0 | X | 4 |

| Sheet C | 1 | 2 | 3 | 4 | 5 | 6 | 7 | 8 | 9 | 10 | Final |
|---|---|---|---|---|---|---|---|---|---|---|---|
| Manitoba (Vande) | 0 | 3 | 3 | 1 | 0 | 1 | 0 | 0 | 1 | X | 9 |
| New Brunswick (Donald) 🔨 | 3 | 0 | 0 | 0 | 1 | 0 | 1 | 1 | 0 | X | 6 |

| Sheet D | 1 | 2 | 3 | 4 | 5 | 6 | 7 | 8 | 9 | 10 | Final |
|---|---|---|---|---|---|---|---|---|---|---|---|
| Prince Edward Island (McLeod) 🔨 | 1 | 0 | 0 | 0 | 2 | 0 | 0 | 0 | X | X | 3 |
| Yukon/Northwest Territories (Bildfell) | 0 | 3 | 1 | 4 | 0 | 1 | 1 | 1 | X | X | 11 |

| Sheet E | 1 | 2 | 3 | 4 | 5 | 6 | 7 | 8 | 9 | 10 | Final |
|---|---|---|---|---|---|---|---|---|---|---|---|
| British Columbia (Kerr) 🔨 | 0 | 1 | 0 | 0 | 0 | 0 | 0 | 1 | 0 | X | 2 |
| Ontario (Provo) | 1 | 0 | 1 | 0 | 0 | 3 | 1 | 0 | 2 | X | 8 |

== Playoffs ==
| Semifinal | | | Final |
| | | | 1 | Nova Scotia | 5 |
| 2 | Yukon/Northwest Territories | 7 | 3 | Alberta | 4 |
| 3 | Alberta | 9 |

=== Semifinal ===
Friday, March 4, 7:30 pm

| Sheet D | 1 | 2 | 3 | 4 | 5 | 6 | 7 | 8 | 9 | 10 | Final |
|---|---|---|---|---|---|---|---|---|---|---|---|
| Alberta (Shaw) | 0 | 1 | 0 | 3 | 0 | 2 | 1 | 0 | 2 | 0 | 9 |
| Yukon/Northwest Territories (Bildfell) 🔨 | 1 | 0 | 2 | 0 | 2 | 0 | 0 | 1 | 0 | 1 | 7 |

Player percentages
| Alberta | | Yukon/Northwest Territories | |
|---|---|---|---|
| Penny Ryan | 90% | Dale Sanderson | 71% |
| Sandra Rippel | 79% | Louise McCrae | 71% |
| — | | Elizabeth McCrae | 63% |
| Cathy Shaw | 78% | Shelly Bildfell | 68% |
| Total | 83% | Total | 68% |

=== Final ===
Saturday, March 5, 1:00 pm

| Sheet C | 1 | 2 | 3 | 4 | 5 | 6 | 7 | 8 | 9 | 10 | Final |
|---|---|---|---|---|---|---|---|---|---|---|---|
| Alberta (Shaw) 🔨 | 0 | 1 | 0 | 1 | 1 | 0 | 0 | 1 | 0 | 0 | 4 |
| Nova Scotia (LaRocque) | 1 | 0 | 2 | 0 | 0 | 0 | 1 | 0 | 0 | 1 | 5 |

Player percentages
| Alberta | | Nova Scotia | |
|---|---|---|---|
| Penny Ryan | 76% | Pamela Sanford | 79% |
| Sandra Rippel | 78% | Cathy Caudle | 68% |
| — | | Sharon Horne | 60% |
| Cathy Shaw | 78% | Penny LaRocque | 84% |
| Total | 77% | Total | 73% |

== Statistics ==
=== Top 5 player percentages ===
Final Round Robin Percentages

Key
| All-Star Team |

| Leads | % |
|---|---|
| (Alberta) Penny Ryan | 77 |
| (Manitoba) Maureen Bonar | 74 |
| (Saskatchewan) Lillian Martin | 72 |
| (Nova Scotia) Pamela Sanford | 71 |
| (British Columbia) Sandy McCubbin | 71 |

| Seconds | % |
|---|---|
| (Alberta) Sandra Rippel (Note: Shot percentage includes draws which Curling Canada statically listed that player as third instead of second due to the team being short handed.) | 70 |
| (Nova Scotia) Cathy Caudle | 70 |
| (Ontario) Marlene Delorenzi | 68 |
| (Quebec) Guylaine Deschatelets | 68 |
| (Manitoba) Iris Armstrong | 68 |

| Thirds | % |
|---|---|
| (Nova Scotia) Sharon Horne | 68 |
| (Ontario) Lorraine Lang | 67 |
| (Manitoba) Carol Dunstone | 64 |
| (Yukon) Elizabeth McCrae | 63 |
| (Prince Edward Island) Cathy Dillon | 63 |
| (Newfoundland and Labrador) Rene Crocker | 63 |

| Skips | % |
|---|---|
| (Alberta) Cathy Shaw | 70 |
| (Yukon) Shelly Bildfell | 70 |
| (Nova Scotia) Penny LaRocque | 69 |
| (Manitoba) Patty Vande | 68 |
| (Newfoundland and Labrador) Ruby Crocker | 64 |

== Awards ==
The all-star team and sportsmanship award winners were as follows:

=== All-Star Team ===
| Position | Name | Team |
|---|---|---|
| Skip | Shelly Bildfell | Yukon/Northwest Territories |
| Third | Sharon Horne | Nova Scotia |
| Second | Cathy Caudle | Nova Scotia |
| Lead | Penny Ryan | Alberta |

=== Ina Hansen Award ===
The Scotties Tournament of Hearts Sportsmanship Award is presented to the curler who best embodies the spirit of curling at the Scotties Tournament of Hearts. The winner was selected in a vote by all players at the tournament.

Prior to 1998, the award was named after a notable individual in the curling community where the tournament was held that year. For this edition, the award was named after Ina Hansen, who won two championships in 1962 and 1964 respectively, becoming the first skip to win multiple titles.

| Name | Team | Position |
|---|---|---|
| Penny LaRocque | Nova Scotia | Skip |
