= 2001 Canadian Senior Curling Championships =

- Host city: Calgary, Alberta
- Arena: Calgary Curling Club
- Dates: January 20-28, 2001
- Men's winner: Manitoba
- Skip: Gary Ross
- Third: Winston Warren
- Second: Gary Smith
- Lead: Ken Orr
- Finalist: Alberta
- Women's winner: Ontario
- Skip: Anne Dunn
- Third: Lindy Marchuk
- Second: Gloria Campbell
- Lead: Fran Todd
- Finalist: Manitoba

The 2001 Canadian Senior Curling Championships were held January 20 to 28 at the Calgary Curling Club in Calgary, Alberta.

== Men's ==
=== Teams ===
Province / Territory	Skip	Third	Second	Lead
Alberta	Tom Reed	Warren Kushnir	Larry Gardeski	Gerry Mittelstadt
British Columbia	Wayne Laface	Val Schwab	Jack Hockey	Barry Brown
Manitoba	Gary Ross	Winston Warren	Gary Smith	Ken Orr
New Brunswick	David Sullivan	Charlie Sullivan Sr.	Tom Rubec	Ken Smith
Newfoundland	Damien Ryan	Fred Wight	Sel Warren	Boyd Day
Northern Ontario	Mike Coulter	Mike Sagle	Wayne McClelland	Rick Elliott
Nova Scotia	Richard Belyea	Gary Copp	Terry MacKenzie	Jim Quinn
Ontario	Axel Larsen	Walter Johnson	Gerry Sundwall	Kent Carstairs
Prince Edward Island	Ted MacFadyen	Barrie Stevenson	John McKay	Mike Coady
Quebec	Mike Carson	Roger Perron	Jean-Luc Fortier	Clement Gilbert
Saskatchewan	Al Kehler	Greig Manwaring	David Mironuck	John Grundy
Northwest Territories/Yukon	Allen Hartman	Vern Christensen	Ron Kapicki	Jim Eirikson

=== Standings ===
Locale	Skip	W	L
Alberta	Tom Reed	11	0
Manitoba	Gary Ross	8	3
Saskatchewan	Al Kehler	6	5
Prince Edward Island	Ted MacFadyen	6	5
Ontario	Axel Larsen	6	5
Northern Ontario	Mike Coulter	6	5
British Columbia	Wayne Laface	5	6
New Brunswick	David Sullivan	5	6
Newfoundland	Damien Ryan	4	7
Quebec	Mike Carson	4	7
Nova Scotia	Richard Belyea	3	8
Northwest Territories/Yukon	Allen Hartman	2	9

=== Results ===
==== Draw 1 ====
Sheet A	1	2	3	4	5	6	7	8	9	10	Final
Ontario (Larsen) 🔨	1	0	1	0	2	0	2	2	X	X	8
Northwest Territories/Yukon (Hartman)	0	0	0	1	0	1	0	0	X	X	2

Sheet C	1	2	3	4	5	6	7	8	9	10	Final
Manitoba (Ross)	0	0	0	0	1	0	0	0	0	X	1
Saskatchewan (Kehler) 🔨	0	2	0	0	0	0	0	0	1	X	3

Sheet E	1	2	3	4	5	6	7	8	9	10	Final
Alberta (Reed) 🔨	1	0	1	2	1	0	0	1	0	X	6
Nova Scotia (Belyea)	0	1	0	0	0	1	0	0	0	X	2

Sheet G	1	2	3	4	5	6	7	8	9	10	Final
New Brunswick (Sullivan)	0	0	0	0	0	0	1	0	1	X	2
Prince Edward Island (MacFadyen) 🔨	1	0	0	0	1	0	0	2	0	X	4

==== Draw 2 ====
Sheet B	1	2	3	4	5	6	7	8	9	10	Final
Nova Scotia (Belyea) 🔨	1	0	1	0	0	1	1	0	1	0	5
New Brunswick (Sullivan)	0	2	0	1	1	0	0	2	0	2	8

Sheet D	1	2	3	4	5	6	7	8	9	10	11	Final
Northern Ontario (Coulter)	0	0	2	1	0	0	1	2	0	0	0	6
Newfoundland (Ryan) 🔨	1	2	0	0	1	0	0	0	1	1	1	7

Sheet F	1	2	3	4	5	6	7	8	9	10	11	Final
British Columbia (Laface)	0	3	0	0	0	0	0	0	0	1	1	5
Quebec (Carson) 🔨	1	0	0	0	0	1	0	0	2	0	0	4

Sheet H	1	2	3	4	5	6	7	8	9	10	Final
Ontario (Larsen) 🔨	1	0	0	0	1	0	1	0	0	X	3
Saskatchewan (Kehler)	0	2	1	0	0	1	0	1	3	X	8

==== Draw 3 ====
Sheet C	1	2	3	4	5	6	7	8	9	10	Final
British Columbia (Laface) 🔨	0	1	0	0	1	0	0	0	0	X	2
Alberta (Reed)	0	0	2	0	0	0	0	0	2	X	4

Sheet E	1	2	3	4	5	6	7	8	9	10	11	Final
Prince Edward Island (MacFadyen) 🔨	0	1	0	3	0	2	0	1	0	0	0	7
Ontario (Larsen)	0	0	1	0	1	0	3	0	1	1	1	8

==== Draw 4 ====
Sheet B	1	2	3	4	5	6	7	8	9	10	Final
Northern Ontario (Coulter) 🔨	0	0	0	1	0	2	1	1	1	X	6
British Columbia (Laface)	0	0	0	0	2	0	0	0	0	X	2

Sheet D	1	2	3	4	5	6	7	8	9	10	Final
Quebec (Carson) 🔨	0	0	1	1	0	1	0	1	0	0	4
Nova Scotia (Belyea)	0	2	0	0	2	0	1	0	1	1	7

Sheet F	1	2	3	4	5	6	7	8	9	10	11	Final
Saskatchewan (Kehler) 🔨	2	1	0	2	0	1	0	0	2	0	2	10
Newfoundland (Ryan)	0	0	1	0	2	0	2	2	0	1	0	8

Sheet H	1	2	3	4	5	6	7	8	9	10	Final
Northwest Territories/Yukon (Hartman) 🔨	2	0	0	1	0	1	0	0	1	1	6
Manitoba (Ross)	0	0	4	0	2	0	1	0	0	0	7

==== Draw 5 ====
Sheet A	1	2	3	4	5	6	7	8	9	10	Final
Alberta (Reed) 🔨	0	1	0	1	0	0	1	0	3	1	7
Prince Edward Island (MacFadyen)	1	0	1	0	0	1	0	1	0	0	4

Sheet C	1	2	3	4	5	6	7	8	9	10	Final
New Brunswick (Sullivan) 🔨	0	2	2	0	1	0	2	0	0	X	7
Northwest Territories/Yukon (Hartman)	0	0	0	2	0	1	0	2	1	X	6

Sheet E	1	2	3	4	5	6	7	8	9	10	Final
Manitoba (Ross) 🔨	0	0	0	1	0	0	0	3	0	0	4
Northern Ontario (Coulter)	0	1	1	0	2	2	1	0	1	1	9

Sheet G	1	2	3	4	5	6	7	8	9	10	Final
Newfoundland (Ryan) 🔨	0	1	0	0	2	0	0	0	0	2	5
Quebec (Carson)	1	0	0	1	0	0	2	0	0	0	4

==== Draw 6 ====
Sheet B	1	2	3	4	5	6	7	8	9	10	Final
Northwest Territories/Yukon (Hartman) 🔨	1	0	0	1	0	0	1	0	1	0	4
Nova Scotia (Belyea)	0	2	0	0	2	0	0	1	0	1	6

Sheet D	1	2	3	4	5	6	7	8	9	10	Final
Saskatchewan (Kehler) 🔨	0	1	3	0	0	0	3	0	X	X	7
Northern Ontario (Coulter)	0	0	0	1	0	0	0	1	X	X	2

Sheet F	1	2	3	4	5	6	7	8	9	10	Final
Quebec (Carson) 🔨	0	1	0	0	1	0	0	0	1	0	3
Alberta (Reed)	0	0	1	1	0	2	0	0	0	1	5

Sheet H	1	2	3	4	5	6	7	8	9	10	Final
Prince Edward Island (MacFadyen) 🔨	2	0	0	0	0	3	0	1	0	3	9
British Columbia (Laface)	0	0	2	1	1	0	1	0	2	0	7

==== Draw 7 ====
Sheet B	1	2	3	4	5	6	7	8	9	10	11	Final
British Columbia (Laface) 🔨	2	0	1	1	0	2	0	0	1	0	0	7
Ontario (Larsen)	0	3	0	0	1	0	0	1	0	2	2	9

Sheet C	1	2	3	4	5	6	7	8	9	10	Final
Newfoundland (Ryan) 🔨	0	1	1	0	1	0	2	0	0	0	5
Prince Edward Island (MacFadyen)	3	0	0	2	0	1	0	0	0	1	7

Sheet E	1	2	3	4	5	6	7	8	9	10	11	Final
Nova Scotia (Belyea) 🔨	2	0	1	2	0	1	0	3	0	0	1	10
Saskatchewan (Kehler)	0	2	0	0	1	0	3	0	2	1	0	9

Sheet G	1	2	3	4	5	6	7	8	9	10	Final
Manitoba (Ross) 🔨	0	1	0	1	1	0	0	3	0	3	9
New Brunswick (Sullivan)	0	0	2	0	0	1	1	0	1	0	5

==== Draw 8 ====
Sheet A	1	2	3	4	5	6	7	8	9	10	Final
New Brunswick (Sullivan) 🔨	1	1	0	2	0	0	2	0	2	X	8
Quebec (Carson)	0	0	1	0	1	0	0	1	0	X	3

Sheet D	1	2	3	4	5	6	7	8	9	10	11	Final
Alberta (Reed) 🔨	1	0	0	1	0	1	0	2	1	0	1	7
Manitoba (Ross)	0	0	1	0	1	0	2	0	0	2	0	6

Sheet E	1	2	3	4	5	6	7	8	9	10	Final
Ontario (Larsen) 🔨	2	0	0	3	0	2	0	1	0	X	8
Newfoundland (Ryan)	0	1	1	0	1	0	1	0	1	X	5

Sheet G	1	2	3	4	5	6	7	8	9	10	Final
Northern Ontario (Coulter) 🔨	0	1	1	0	0	2	0	4	2	X	10
Northwest Territories/Yukon (Hartman)	1	0	0	1	2	0	2	0	0	X	6

==== Draw 9 ====
Sheet A	1	2	3	4	5	6	7	8	9	10	11	Final
Ontario (Larsen) 🔨	0	0	1	0	2	0	0	0	0	1	0	4
Manitoba (Ross)	0	0	0	1	0	0	1	1	1	0	2	6

Sheet D	1	2	3	4	5	6	7	8	9	10	Final
Prince Edward Island (MacFadyen) 🔨	1	0	0	0	2	0	1	0	2	0	6
Quebec (Carson)	0	1	1	1	0	1	0	3	0	2	9

Sheet F	1	2	3	4	5	6	7	8	9	10	Final
Saskatchewan (Kehler) 🔨	0	1	0	1	0	2	0	1	0	0	5
Northwest Territories/Yukon (Hartman)	0	0	1	0	1	0	3	0	0	1	6

Sheet H	1	2	3	4	5	6	7	8	9	10	Final
New Brunswick (Sullivan) 🔨	1	0	1	1	0	2	0	2	0	1	8
Newfoundland (Ryan)	0	4	0	0	1	0	1	0	1	0	7

==== Draw 10 ====
Sheet B	1	2	3	4	5	6	7	8	9	10	Final
Quebec (Carson) 🔨	0	2	2	0	0	2	0	2	0	X	8
Northern Ontario (Coulter)	0	0	0	1	1	0	1	0	1	X	4

Sheet C	1	2	3	4	5	6	7	8	9	10	Final
Manitoba (Ross) 🔨	1	0	0	0	0	1	0	0	0	1	3
Nova Scotia (Belyea)	0	0	1	0	0	0	0	1	0	0	2

Sheet F	1	2	3	4	5	6	7	8	9	10	11	Final
Newfoundland (Ryan) 🔨	1	1	0	0	1	0	0	0	2	0	2	7
British Columbia (Laface)	0	0	0	1	0	1	1	1	0	1	0	5

Sheet H	1	2	3	4	5	6	7	8	9	10	Final
Northwest Territories/Yukon (Hartman) 🔨	1	1	0	2	0	0	1	0	X	X	5
Alberta (Reed)	0	0	1	0	3	3	0	3	X	X	10

==== Draw 11 ====
Sheet A	1	2	3	4	5	6	7	8	9	10	Final
Nova Scotia (Belyea) 🔨	0	0	1	0	2	0	1	0	X	X	4
Prince Edward Island (MacFadyen)	2	2	0	2	0	3	0	1	X	X	10

Sheet C	1	2	3	4	5	6	7	8	9	10	Final
Northern Ontario (Coulter) 🔨	0	0	1	1	0	2	0	3	0	0	7
Ontario (Larsen)	0	1	0	0	2	0	1	0	1	1	6

Sheet E	1	2	3	4	5	6	7	8	9	10	Final
Alberta (Reed) 🔨	1	0	2	0	0	4	0	1	0	1	9
New Brunswick (Sullivan)	0	1	0	0	2	0	3	0	2	0	8

Sheet G	1	2	3	4	5	6	7	8	9	10	11	Final
British Columbia (Laface) 🔨	0	1	0	2	0	0	2	0	0	1	1	7
Saskatchewan (Kehler)	0	0	1	0	1	1	0	2	1	0	0	6

==== Draw 12 ====
Sheet B	1	2	3	4	5	6	7	8	9	10	Final
Saskatchewan (Kehler) 🔨	0	0	0	1	0	0	X	X	X	X	1
New Brunswick (Sullivan)	3	1	0	0	4	1	X	X	X	X	9

Sheet D	1	2	3	4	5	6	7	8	9	10	11	Final
Northwest Territories/Yukon (Hartman) 🔨	0	0	1	0	1	0	0	2	0	3	1	8
Newfoundland (Ryan)	1	1	0	0	0	2	2	0	1	0	0	7

Sheet F	1	2	3	4	5	6	7	8	9	10	Final
Manitoba (Ross) 🔨	0	3	0	1	0	0	0	1	0	X	5
Quebec (Carson)	0	0	2	0	0	1	0	0	1	X	4

Sheet H	1	2	3	4	5	6	7	8	9	10	Final
Nova Scotia (Belyea) 🔨	0	2	0	0	1	0	1	0	1	X	5
Northern Ontario (Coulter)	0	0	2	1	0	1	0	4	0	X	8

==== Draw 13 ====
Sheet B	1	2	3	4	5	6	7	8	9	10	Final
Newfoundland (Ryan) 🔨	1	0	1	0	2	0	1	0	1	0	6
Alberta (Reed)	0	3	0	2	0	1	0	1	0	1	8

Sheet D	1	2	3	4	5	6	7	8	9	10	Final
New Brunswick (Sullivan) 🔨	0	1	0	2	0	1	0	0	2	0	6
British Columbia (Laface)	0	0	3	0	1	0	2	1	0	1	8

Sheet F	1	2	3	4	5	6	7	8	9	10	Final
Northern Ontario (Coulter) 🔨	0	0	1	0	0	0	0	2	1	0	4
Prince Edward Island (MacFadyen)	0	1	0	0	1	0	1	0	0	2	5

Sheet H	1	2	3	4	5	6	7	8	9	10	Final
Quebec (Carson) 🔨	0	1	0	0	1	0	0	1	0	1	4
Ontario (Larsen)	0	0	1	0	0	0	1	0	1	0	3

==== Draw 14 ====
Sheet A	1	2	3	4	5	6	7	8	9	10	Final
British Columbia (Laface) 🔨	3	0	0	5	0	0	4	X	X	X	12
Northwest Territories/Yukon (Hartman)	0	1	0	0	2	0	0	X	X	X	3

Sheet C	1	2	3	4	5	6	7	8	9	10	Final
Alberta (Reed) 🔨	0	1	0	1	0	2	0	0	1	X	5
Saskatchewan (Kehler)	0	0	0	0	1	0	1	0	0	X	2

Sheet F	1	2	3	4	5	6	7	8	9	10	Final
Ontario (Larsen) 🔨	3	0	3	0	2	0	3	X	X	X	11
Nova Scotia (Belyea)	0	2	0	2	0	1	0	X	X	X	5

Sheet H	1	2	3	4	5	6	7	8	9	10	Final
Prince Edward Island (MacFadyen) 🔨	1	0	1	0	1	0	3	0	1	0	7
Manitoba (Ross)	0	3	0	1	0	1	0	1	0	2	8

==== Draw 15 ====
Sheet B	1	2	3	4	5	6	7	8	9	10	11	12	Final
Manitoba (Ross) 🔨	0	0	0	0	1	0	0	1	1	0	0	2	5
Newfoundland (Ryan)	0	0	0	0	0	1	0	0	0	2	0	0	3

Sheet C	1	2	3	4	5	6	7	8	9	10	11	Final
Nova Scotia (Belyea) 🔨	2	0	1	0	1	0	0	1	0	1	0	6
British Columbia (Laface)	0	1	0	2	0	0	2	0	1	0	1	7

Sheet E	1	2	3	4	5	6	7	8	9	10	Final
New Brunswick (Sullivan) 🔨	1	0	1	0	0	0	1	0	1	X	4
Northern Ontario (Coulter)	0	1	0	1	1	0	0	3	0	X	6

Sheet G	1	2	3	4	5	6	7	8	9	10	Final
Alberta (Reed) 🔨	0	2	0	0	2	0	0	1	1	X	6
Ontario (Larsen)	0	0	1	1	0	2	0	0	0	X	4

==== Draw 16 ====
Sheet A	1	2	3	4	5	6	7	8	9	10	Final
Northern Ontario (Coulter) 🔨	0	0	1	0	1	0	1	1	0	X	4
Alberta (Reed)	0	3	0	2	0	1	0	0	2	X	8

Sheet C	1	2	3	4	5	6	7	8	9	10	Final
Ontario (Larsen) 🔨	2	0	0	1	0	4	0	0	1	X	8
New Brunswick (Sullivan)	0	1	1	0	1	0	0	1	0	X	4

Sheet E	1	2	3	4	5	6	7	8	9	10	Final
Northwest Territories/Yukon (Hartman) 🔨	1	0	1	0	0	1	1	0	1	X	5
Prince Edward Island (MacFadyen)	0	1	0	3	1	0	0	3	0	X	8

Sheet G	1	2	3	4	5	6	7	8	9	10	Final
Saskatchewan (Kehler) 🔨	2	0	0	0	3	0	0	1	0	X	6
Quebec (Carson)	0	0	1	0	0	1	1	0	1	X	4

==== Draw 17 ====
Sheet B	1	2	3	4	5	6	7	8	9	10	Final
Prince Edward Island (MacFadyen) 🔨	2	0	0	1	0	1	1	1	0	0	6
Saskatchewan (Kehler)	0	2	0	0	1	0	0	0	3	1	7

Sheet C	1	2	3	4	5	6	7	8	9	10	Final
Quebec (Carson) 🔨	0	0	3	1	1	0	1	1	0	X	7
Northwest Territories/Yukon (Hartman)	1	2	0	0	0	0	0	0	1	X	4

Sheet E	1	2	3	4	5	6	7	8	9	10	Final
British Columbia (Laface) 🔨	0	1	0	0	2	0	1	0	1	0	5
Manitoba (Ross)	1	0	2	1	0	1	0	0	0	1	6

Sheet G	1	2	3	4	5	6	7	8	9	10	Final
Newfoundland (Ryan) 🔨	0	1	0	1	0	0	2	0	1	1	6
Nova Scotia (Belyea)	0	0	1	0	1	2	0	1	0	0	5

=== Tiebreakers ===
==== Tiebreaker #1 ====
Sheet E	1	2	3	4	5	6	7	8	9	10	Final
Saskatchewan (Kehler) 🔨	2	0	2	5	0	0	1	0	X	X	10
Northern Ontario (Coulter)	0	1	0	0	0	2	0	1	X	X	4

Player percentages
Saskatchewan		Northern Ontario	
John Grundy	63%	Rick Elliott	83%
David Mironuck	84%	Wayne McClelland	89%
Greig Manwaring	84%	Mike Sagle	70%
Al Kehler	100%	Mike Coulter	67%
Total	84%	Total	77%

Sheet F	1	2	3	4	5	6	7	8	9	10	Final
Ontario (Larsen)	0	1	0	0	0	1	1	0	0	1	4
Prince Edward Island (MacFadyen) 🔨	1	0	0	0	1	0	0	1	0	0	3

Player percentages
Ontario		Prince Edward Island	
Kent Carstiars	84%	Mike Coady	93%
Gerry Sundwall	91%	John McKay	76%
Walter Johnson	81%	Barrie Stevenson	76%
Axel Larsen	96%	Ted MacFadyen	81%
Total	88%	Total	82%

==== Tiebreaker #2 ====
Sheet C	1	2	3	4	5	6	7	8	9	10	Final
Ontario (Larsen)	0	2	0	0	2	0	0	1	0	2	7
Saskatchewan (Kehler) 🔨	1	0	1	0	0	1	0	0	1	0	4

Player percentages
Ontario		Saskatchewan	
Kent Carstairs	88%	John Grundy	85%
Gerry Sundwall	83%	David Mironuck	83%
Walter Johnson	83%	Greig Manwaring	79%
Axel Larsen	96%	Al Kehler	75%
Total	87%	Total	80%

=== Playoffs ===
Semifinal		Final
Manitoba	6
Ontario	5	Alberta	6
		Manitoba	7

==== Semifinal ====
Sheet E	1	2	3	4	5	6	7	8	9	10	Final
Manitoba (Ross) 🔨	1	0	0	1	1	0	0	1	0	2	6
Ontario (Larsen)	0	0	2	0	0	2	0	0	1	0	5

Player percentages
Manitoba		Ontario	
Ken Orr	84%	Kent Carstairs	89%
Gary Smith	79%	Gerry Sundwall	69%
Winston Warren	86%	Walter Johnson	80%
Gary Ross	78%	Axel Larsen	84%
Total	82%	Total	80%

==== Final ====
Sheet F	1	2	3	4	5	6	7	8	9	10	11	Final
Alberta (Reed) 🔨	0	1	0	2	0	2	0	0	0	1	0	6
Manitoba (Ross)	0	0	1	0	2	0	2	1	0	0	1	7

== Women's ==
=== Teams ===
Province / Territory	Skip	Third	Second	Lead
Alberta	Susan Seitz	Heather Loat	Darlene Breckenridge	Sharen McLean
British Columbia	Morreen MacLeod	Bonnie Stroup	Fran Deptuck	Betty Johnston
Manitoba	Linda Van Daele	Joyce McDougall	Evelyn Clegg	Jean Ungarian
New Brunswick	Barb Hutton	Wendy Shephard	Mona Train	Nancy Steele
Newfoundland	Thelma Stockley	Ann Shears	Betty Baird Cross	Shirley Down
Northern Ontario	Raylene D'Agostino	Brenda Johnston	Arlene Stepanick	Barbara Gordon
Nova Scotia	Penny LaRocque	Sharon Clarke-Horne	Sharon Low	Louise MacPhee
Ontario	Anne Dunn	Lindy Marchuk	Gloria Campbell	Fran Todd
Prince Edward Island	Barbara Currie	Ann Currie	Joyce Duffy	Helen MacDonald
Quebec	Agnes Charette	Martha Don	Lois Baines	Mary Anne Robertson
Saskatchewan	Nancy Kerr	Linda Burnham	Kenda Richards	Gertie Pick
Yukon/Northwest Territories	Evelyn Pasichnyk	Donna Sanderson	Suzanne Laberge	Bernice Broder

=== Standings ===
Locale	Skip	W	L
Manitoba	Linda Van Daele	9	2
Quebec	Agnes Charette	8	3
British Columbia	Morreen MacLeod	7	4
Ontario	Anne Dunn	7	4
Saskatchewan	Nancy Kerr	7	4
Nova Scotia	Penny LaRocque	6	5
Alberta	Susan Seitz	6	5
New Brunswick	Barb Hutton	4	7
Prince Edward Island	Barbara Currie	4	7
Northern Ontario	Raylene D'Agostino	3	8
Newfoundland	Thelma Stockley	3	8
Yukon/Northwest Territories	Evelyn Pasichnyk	2	9

=== Results ===
==== Draw 1 ====
Sheet B	1	2	3	4	5	6	7	8	9	10	Final
Ontario (Dunn) 🔨	1	2	1	2	3	2	2	X	X	X	13
Yukon/Northwest Territories (Pasichnyk)	0	0	0	0	0	0	0	X	X	X	0

Sheet D	1	2	3	4	5	6	7	8	9	10	Final
Manitoba (Van Daele) 🔨	1	1	2	0	3	0	1	0	1	X	9
Saskatchewan (Kerr)	0	0	0	1	0	1	0	2	0	X	4

Sheet F	1	2	3	4	5	6	7	8	9	10	11	Final
Alberta (Seitz)	0	1	1	1	0	0	0	0	1	0	0	4
Nova Scotia (LaRocque) 🔨	0	0	0	0	2	0	1	0	0	1	1	5

Sheet H	1	2	3	4	5	6	7	8	9	10	Final
New Brunswick (Hutton) 🔨	1	0	1	0	3	0	1	0	0	1	7
Prince Edward Island (Currie)	0	1	0	2	0	1	0	1	1	0	6

==== Draw 2 ====
Sheet A	1	2	3	4	5	6	7	8	9	10	Final
Nova Scotia (LaRocque) 🔨	2	0	0	0	1	2	0	0	3	2	10
New Brunswick (Hutton)	0	2	2	1	0	0	1	1	0	0	7

Sheet C	1	2	3	4	5	6	7	8	9	10	Final
Northern Ontario (D'Agostino) 🔨	1	2	0	0	1	0	4	0	1	X	9
Newfoundland (Stockley)	0	0	0	1	0	1	0	3	0	X	5

Sheet E	1	2	3	4	5	6	7	8	9	10	Final
British Columbia (MacLeod) 🔨	1	0	0	4	0	1	1	0	0	0	7
Quebec (Charette)	0	0	2	0	3	0	0	2	1	3	11

Sheet G	1	2	3	4	5	6	7	8	9	10	Final
Ontario (Dunn) 🔨	0	1	0	1	0	1	0	2	0	1	6
Saskatchewan (Kerr)	1	0	2	0	0	0	1	0	1	0	5

==== Draw 3 ====
Sheet D	1	2	3	4	5	6	7	8	9	10	Final
British Columbia (MacLeod) 🔨	1	1	0	1	1	0	1	0	3	0	8
Alberta (Seitz)	0	0	2	0	0	2	0	3	0	2	9

Sheet F	1	2	3	4	5	6	7	8	9	10	Final
Prince Edward Island (Currie) 🔨	1	0	1	1	0	1	0	1	0	1	6
Ontario (Dunn)	0	2	0	0	1	0	2	0	0	0	5

==== Draw 4 ====
Sheet A	1	2	3	4	5	6	7	8	9	10	Final
Northern Ontario (D'Agostino) 🔨	0	1	0	0	0	X	X	X	X	X	1
British Columbia (MacLeod)	2	0	5	5	1	X	X	X	X	X	13

Sheet C	1	2	3	4	5	6	7	8	9	10	Final
Quebec (Charette) 🔨	0	0	2	1	0	0	1	0	0	1	5
Nova Scotia (LaRocque)	1	0	0	0	0	1	0	1	1	0	4

Sheet E	1	2	3	4	5	6	7	8	9	10	Final
Saskatchewan (Kerr) 🔨	0	4	2	0	2	0	2	0	X	X	10
Newfoundland (Stockley)	0	0	0	0	0	1	0	1	X	X	2

Sheet G	1	2	3	4	5	6	7	8	9	10	Final
Yukon/Northwest Territories (Pasichnyk) 🔨	1	0	2	0	0	1	0	1	0	X	5
Manitoba (Van Daele)	0	2	0	2	0	0	2	0	2	X	8

==== Draw 5 ====
Sheet B	1	2	3	4	5	6	7	8	9	10	Final
Alberta (Seitz) 🔨	1	0	1	1	1	0	0	4	X	X	8
Prince Edward Island (Currie)	0	1	0	0	0	2	0	0	X	X	3

Sheet D	1	2	3	4	5	6	7	8	9	10	Final
New Brunswick (Hutton) 🔨	1	0	0	0	0	0	1	0	X	X	2
Yukon/Northwest Territories (Pasichnyk)	0	1	1	2	2	2	0	1	X	X	9

Sheet F	1	2	3	4	5	6	7	8	9	10	Final
Manitoba (Van Daele) 🔨	3	1	1	1	1	0	0	1	0	X	8
Northern Ontario (D'Agostino)	0	0	0	0	0	1	1	0	1	X	3

Sheet H	1	2	3	4	5	6	7	8	9	10	Final
Newfoundland (Stockley) 🔨	3	0	1	0	3	0	1	1	0	1	10
Quebec (Charette)	0	1	0	2	0	3	0	0	3	0	9

==== Draw 6 ====
Sheet A	1	2	3	4	5	6	7	8	9	10	Final
Yukon/Northwest Territories (Pasichnyk) 🔨	2	0	0	0	0	1	2	X	X	X	5
Nova Scotia (LaRocque)	0	6	2	2	1	0	0	X	X	X	11

Sheet C	1	2	3	4	5	6	7	8	9	10	Final
Saskatchewan (Kerr) 🔨	1	0	3	0	1	0	1	0	2	0	8
Northern Ontario (D'Agostino)	0	2	0	1	0	1	0	2	0	0	6

Sheet E	1	2	3	4	5	6	7	8	9	10	Final
Quebec (Charette) 🔨	1	0	1	1	0	0	1	0	2	2	8
Alberta (Seitz)	0	1	0	0	0	1	0	3	0	0	5

Sheet G	1	2	3	4	5	6	7	8	9	10	Final
Prince Edward Island (Currie) 🔨	0	1	0	0	0	1	0	0	0	X	2
British Columbia (MacLeod)	0	0	2	2	2	0	1	1	3	X	11

==== Draw 7 ====
Sheet A	1	2	3	4	5	6	7	8	9	10	11	Final
British Columbia (MacLeod) 🔨	1	0	2	1	0	0	2	0	2	0	1	9
Ontario (Dunn)	0	0	0	0	2	1	0	2	0	3	0	8

Sheet D	1	2	3	4	5	6	7	8	9	10	Final
Newfoundland (Stockley) 🔨	3	1	0	0	1	0	0	0	X	X	5
Prince Edward Island (Currie)	0	0	3	1	0	2	1	4	X	X	11

Sheet F	1	2	3	4	5	6	7	8	9	10	Final
Nova Scotia (LaRocque) 🔨	1	0	1	1	0	0	0	3	0	0	6
Saskatchewan (Kerr)	0	2	0	0	0	1	1	0	3	1	8

Sheet H	1	2	3	4	5	6	7	8	9	10	Final
Manitoba (Van Daele) 🔨	1	0	0	2	1	0	0	2	0	2	8
New Brunswick (Hutton)	0	2	1	0	0	0	1	0	2	0	6

==== Draw 8 ====
Sheet B	1	2	3	4	5	6	7	8	9	10	Final
New Brunswick (Hutton) 🔨	1	0	1	0	0	1	0	X	X	X	3
Quebec (Charette)	0	2	0	2	4	0	3	X	X	X	11

Sheet C	1	2	3	4	5	6	7	8	9	10	Final
Alberta (Seitz) 🔨	3	0	0	0	3	0	0	3	1	X	10
Manitoba (Van Daele)	0	1	3	1	0	1	1	0	0	X	7

Sheet F	1	2	3	4	5	6	7	8	9	10	Final
Ontario (Dunn) 🔨	5	0	2	0	0	1	0	1	0	X	9
Newfoundland (Stockley)	0	1	0	2	1	0	2	0	1	X	7

Sheet H	1	2	3	4	5	6	7	8	9	10	Final
Northern Ontario (D'Agostino) 🔨	0	1	2	1	0	0	2	0	0	0	6
Yukon/Northwest Territories (Pasichnyk)	1	0	0	0	3	1	0	1	1	1	8

==== Draw 9 ====
Sheet B	1	2	3	4	5	6	7	8	9	10	Final
Ontario (Dunn) 🔨	1	0	1	1	0	0	4	3	0	X	10
Manitoba (Van Daele)	0	1	0	0	3	1	0	0	2	X	7

Sheet C	1	2	3	4	5	6	7	8	9	10	Final
Prince Edward Island (Currie) 🔨	0	0	0	2	0	0	4	2	0	X	8
Quebec (Charette)	1	1	0	0	1	1	0	0	1	X	5

Sheet E	1	2	3	4	5	6	7	8	9	10	Final
Saskatchewan (Kerr) 🔨	2	2	0	0	2	1	2	1	X	X	10
Yukon/Northwest Territories (Pasichnyk)	0	0	1	1	0	0	0	0	X	X	2

Sheet G	1	2	3	4	5	6	7	8	9	10	Final
New Brunswick (Hutton) 🔨	3	0	1	0	0	2	0	0	5	X	11
Newfoundland (Stockley)	0	1	0	0	3	0	2	1	0	X	7

==== Draw 10 ====
Sheet A	1	2	3	4	5	6	7	8	9	10	Final
Quebec (Charette) 🔨	2	4	0	1	0	2	X	X	X	X	9
Northern Ontario (D'Agostino)	0	0	1	0	1	0	X	X	X	X	2

Sheet D	1	2	3	4	5	6	7	8	9	10	Final
Manitoba (Van Daele) 🔨	0	6	0	1	0	0	3	0	0	2	12
Nova Scotia (LaRocque)	3	0	1	0	1	1	0	3	1	0	10

Sheet E	1	2	3	4	5	6	7	8	9	10	Final
Newfoundland (Stockley) 🔨	2	0	1	0	0	0	3	0	X	X	6
British Columbia (MacLeod)	0	4	0	2	0	2	0	4	X	X	12

Sheet G	1	2	3	4	5	6	7	8	9	10	Final
Yukon/Northwest Territories (Pasichnyk) 🔨	0	1	3	0	1	0	1	0	2	X	8
Alberta (Seitz)	2	0	0	2	0	4	0	2	0	X	10

==== Draw 11 ====
Sheet B	1	2	3	4	5	6	7	8	9	10	Final
Nova Scotia (LaRocque) 🔨	0	1	0	3	1	0	2	0	0	X	7
Prince Edward Island (Currie)	2	0	1	0	0	1	0	1	1	X	6

Sheet D	1	2	3	4	5	6	7	8	9	10	Final
Northern Ontario (D'Agostino) 🔨	0	1	0	1	1	0	0	2	0	X	5
Ontario (Dunn)	1	0	3	0	0	4	1	0	1	X	10

Sheet F	1	2	3	4	5	6	7	8	9	10	Final
Alberta (Seitz) 🔨	0	2	1	0	1	0	0	0	X	X	4
New Brunswick (Hutton)	2	0	0	5	0	2	1	1	X	X	11

Sheet H	1	2	3	4	5	6	7	8	9	10	11	Final
British Columbia (MacLeod) 🔨	1	0	0	1	0	2	0	1	0	1	1	7
Saskatchewan (Kerr)	0	1	1	0	2	0	1	0	1	0	0	6

==== Draw 12 ====
Sheet A	1	2	3	4	5	6	7	8	9	10	Final
Saskatchewan (Kerr) 🔨	0	2	0	0	2	0	1	1	0	X	6
New Brunswick (Hutton)	0	0	1	1	0	1	0	0	0	X	3

Sheet C	1	2	3	4	5	6	7	8	9	10	Final
Yukon/Northwest Territories (Pasichnyk) 🔨	0	0	2	2	1	2	0	0	0	X	7
Newfoundland (Stockley)	3	3	0	0	0	0	1	1	1	X	9

Sheet E	1	2	3	4	5	6	7	8	9	10	Final
Manitoba (Van Daele) 🔨	3	0	0	0	2	1	0	1	0	X	7
Quebec (Charette)	0	1	1	0	0	0	1	0	1	X	4

Sheet G	1	2	3	4	5	6	7	8	9	10	11	Final
Nova Scotia (LaRocque) 🔨	3	0	1	0	0	1	0	1	1	0	1	8
Northern Ontario (D'Agostino)	0	1	0	1	1	0	2	0	0	2	0	7

==== Draw 13 ====
Sheet A	1	2	3	4	5	6	7	8	9	10	11	Final
Newfoundland (Stockley) 🔨	2	0	1	2	0	2	0	1	0	0	0	8
Alberta (Seitz)	0	3	0	0	2	0	1	0	1	1	1	9

Sheet C	1	2	3	4	5	6	7	8	9	10	Final
New Brunswick (Hutton) 🔨	1	1	0	1	0	0	0	1	0	X	4
British Columbia (MacLeod)	0	0	0	0	2	1	1	0	2	X	6

Sheet E	1	2	3	4	5	6	7	8	9	10	Final
Northern Ontario (D'Agostino) 🔨	2	0	2	1	0	1	1	0	1	2	10
Prince Edward Island (Currie)	0	2	0	0	1	0	0	4	0	0	7

Sheet G	1	2	3	4	5	6	7	8	9	10	Final
Quebec (Charette) 🔨	2	0	1	0	0	1	0	3	0	0	7
Ontario (Dunn)	0	2	0	1	0	0	1	0	1	1	6

==== Draw 14 ====
Sheet B	1	2	3	4	5	6	7	8	9	10	Final
British Columbia (MacLeod) 🔨	4	4	0	1	0	2	X	X	X	X	11
Yukon/Northwest Territories (Pasichnyk)	0	0	2	0	1	0	X	X	X	X	3

Sheet C	1	2	3	4	5	6	7	8	9	10	Final
Alberta (Seitz) 🔨	0	0	1	0	0	2	0	2	0	X	5
Saskatchewan (Kerr)	1	4	0	3	0	0	2	0	1	X	11

Sheet E	1	2	3	4	5	6	7	8	9	10	Final
Ontario (Dunn) 🔨	1	1	1	0	2	0	1	0	0	1	7
Nova Scotia (LaRocque)	0	0	0	1	0	1	0	2	1	0	5

Sheet G	1	2	3	4	5	6	7	8	9	10	Final
Prince Edward Island (Currie) 🔨	0	2	0	0	1	2	0	2	0	0	7
Manitoba (Van Daele)	0	0	1	0	0	0	3	0	4	1	9

==== Draw 15 ====
Sheet A	1	2	3	4	5	6	7	8	9	10	Final
Manitoba (Van Daele) 🔨	2	1	0	1	0	5	0	1	0	X	10
Newfoundland (Stockley)	0	0	1	0	1	0	2	0	2	X	6

Sheet D	1	2	3	4	5	6	7	8	9	10	Final
Nova Scotia (LaRocque) 🔨	2	0	0	2	0	0	1	2	1	X	8
British Columbia (MacLeod)	0	1	1	0	2	0	0	0	0	X	4

Sheet F	1	2	3	4	5	6	7	8	9	10	Final
New Brunswick (Hutton) 🔨	0	1	0	0	1	0	1	0	2	X	5
Northern Ontario (D'Agostino)	0	0	4	1	0	3	0	1	0	X	9

Sheet H	1	2	3	4	5	6	7	8	9	10	Final
Alberta (Seitz) 🔨	1	2	0	1	0	2	0	0	1	1	8
Ontario (Dunn)	0	0	1	0	3	0	4	1	0	0	9

==== Draw 16 ====
Sheet B	1	2	3	4	5	6	7	8	9	10	11	Final
Northern Ontario (D'Agostino) 🔨	3	0	0	1	0	1	0	1	0	1	0	7
Alberta (Seitz)	0	1	4	0	1	0	0	0	1	0	2	9

Sheet D	1	2	3	4	5	6	7	8	9	10	11	Final
Ontario (Dunn) 🔨	0	0	4	0	1	0	0	2	0	1	0	8
New Brunswick (Hutton)	2	1	0	1	0	1	1	0	2	0	1	9

Sheet F	1	2	3	4	5	6	7	8	9	10	Final
Yukon/Northwest Territories (Pasichnyk) 🔨	1	0	2	0	2	0	0	0	0	X	5
Prince Edward Island (Currie)	0	2	0	1	0	0	0	3	3	X	9

Sheet H	1	2	3	4	5	6	7	8	9	10	Final
Saskatchewan (Kerr) 🔨	0	1	0	0	0	0	2	0	0	X	3
Quebec (Charette)	0	0	0	2	1	1	0	1	1	X	6

==== Draw 17 ====
Sheet A	1	2	3	4	5	6	7	8	9	10	Final
Prince Edward Island (Currie) 🔨	0	0	2	0	1	0	X	X	X	X	3
Saskatchewan (Kerr)	2	4	0	3	0	1	X	X	X	X	10

Sheet D	1	2	3	4	5	6	7	8	9	10	Final
Quebec (Charette) 🔨	1	0	0	1	1	0	3	1	3	X	10
Yukon/Northwest Territories (Pasichnyk)	0	0	1	0	0	3	0	0	0	X	4

Sheet F	1	2	3	4	5	6	7	8	9	10	Final
British Columbia (MacLeod) 🔨	0	2	0	0	3	0	0	0	0	X	5
Manitoba (Van Daele)	0	0	0	2	0	2	2	1	1	X	8

Sheet H	1	2	3	4	5	6	7	8	9	10	Final
Newfoundland (Stockley) 🔨	1	1	1	0	1	1	0	1	0	0	6
Nova Scotia (LaRocque)	0	0	0	1	0	0	2	0	1	1	5

=== Playoffs ===
Tiebreaker #1
Ontario	11
Saskatchewan	5

Tiebreaker #2
British Columbia	5
Ontario	8

Semifinal
Quebec	5
Ontario	6

Final
Manitoba	4
Ontario	10

==== Tiebreaker #1 ====
Sheet D	1	2	3	4	5	6	7	8	9	10	Final
Ontario (Dunn) 🔨	1	0	3	0	5	0	0	2	X	X	11
Saskatchewan (Kerr)	0	1	0	2	0	2	0	0	X	X	5

Player percentages
Ontario		Saskatchewan	
Fran Todd	58%	Gertie Pick	73%
Gloria Campbell	81%	Kenda Richards	70%
Lindy Marchuk	72%	Linda Burnham	73%
Anne Dunn	81%	Nancy Kerr	58%
Total	73%	Total	69%

==== Tiebreaker #2 ====
Sheet E	1	2	3	4	5	6	7	8	9	10	Final
British Columbia (MacLeod)	0	0	0	1	0	3	0	1	0	X	5
Ontario (Dunn) 🔨	1	0	2	0	1	0	1	0	3	X	8

Player percentages
British Columbia		Ontario	
Betty Johnston	55%	Fran Todd	72%
Fran Deptuck	74%	Gloria Campbell	73%
Bonnie Stroup	65%	Lindy Marchuk	73%
Morreen MacLeod	74%	Anne Dunn	95%
Total	67%	Total	78%

==== Semifinal ====
Sheet C	1	2	3	4	5	6	7	8	9	10	Final
Quebec (Charette) 🔨	1	0	2	0	1	0	0	0	1	X	5
Ontario (Dunn)	0	1	0	3	0	0	2	0	0	X	8

Player percentages
Quebec		Ontario	
Mary Anne Robertson	89%	Fran Todd	75%
Lois Baines	85%	Gloria Campbell	85%
Martha Don	81%	Lindy Marchuk	75%
Agnes Charette	74%	Anne Dunn	88%
Total	82%	Total	80%

==== Final ====
Sheet F	1	2	3	4	5	6	7	8	9	10	Final
Manitoba (Van Daele) 🔨	1	0	0	0	1	0	0	0	2	X	4
Ontario (Dunn)	0	2	0	1	0	3	3	1	0	X	10
