= Penny LaRocque =

Canadian curler

Medal record

Curling

World Championships
Bronze medal – third place	1983 Moose Jaw	

Scotties Tournament of Hearts
Gold medal – first place	1983 Prince George	
Silver medal – second place	1978 Sault Ste. Marie	

Penny LaRocque (born ca. 1943 in Yarmouth, Nova Scotia) is a Canadian retired curler from Halifax, Nova Scotia. She is a former Canadian champion skip and world championship bronze medallist. She retired from curling in 2007.

== Career ==
LaRocque has won five provincial women's championships, five provincial mixed titles, and seven provincial seniors titles. Her first provincial title came in 1974, playing second for the Joyce Myers rink, and went 2-7 at the 1974 Macdonald Lassies Championship.. Her second title came in 1978, where she skipped the Nova Scotia rink to a 2nd place finish at the 1978 Macdonald Lassies Championship. She also won the 1979 and 1983 provincial titles as skip, and the 1986 title, playing third for Colleen Jones. LaRocque won her only national title at the 1983 Scott Tournament of Hearts. She represented Canada at the 1983 Pioneer Life World Women's Curling Championship where her rink won the bronze medal.

LaRocque's five provincial mixed titles came in 1979, 1981, 1982, 1984 and 1987 playing third in each event for Lowell Goulden (1979), Steve Miller (1981), Steve Ogden (1982 & 1984) and Bill Campbell (1987).

LaRocque's seven provincial seniors titles came in 1996, 1998, 2001, 2004, 2005, 2006, and 2007. She skipped in all but the 2004 and 2005 events, where she played third for Sue Anne Bartlett.

LaRocque was inducted into the Canadian Curling Hall of Fame in 1989 and the Nova Scotia Sport Hall of Fame in 2007.

== Politics ==
LaRocque ran for the Nova Scotia Liberal Party in the riding of Halifax Bedford Basin in the 1988 Nova Scotia general election. She lost to the Progressive Conservative candidate, Joel Matheson by 1500 votes.
