= Western Canada Women's Curling Championship =

The Eaton's Western Canada Women's Curling Championship was the championship for women's curling in Western Canada from 1953 to 1960.

The event was the forerunner of Canada's national women's curling championship (now called the Scotties Tournament of Hearts), which officially began in 1961.

The event was announced in November 1952, with the formation of the Western Canada Ladies Curling Association, and the event was initially called the Eaton Western Ladies' Curling Championship. Eaton's, the main sponsor of the event, donated a specially designed trophy to be awarded to the winning team. They also provided financial compensation of the transportation and accommodation of the teams.

The event usually featured the provincial champions of Canada's four western provinces, namely British Columbia, Alberta, Saskatchewan and Manitoba. The inaugural event did not feature a team from BC, and in 1957, a team from Quebec was invited. The event was held as a double round-robin, with a playoff only held to break ties.

The winner of the last event in 1960, Joyce McKee from Saskatchewan played off against the champions of Eastern Canada (Ruth Smith of Quebec) for the first Canadian championship. It was the only year a championship was organized for Eastern Canada. In January 1960, the Western Canada Ladies Curling Association voted to form a full national championship featuring teams from all of Canada's 10 provinces to be held in 1961.

== Champions ==
Tournament	Winning Province	Winning Team	Host
1953	Saskatchewan	Janet Perkin, Phyllis Day, Jean Graham, Joyce Miller	Regina, Saskatchewan
1954	Alberta	Dorothy Thompson, Ila Watson, Hazel Olson, Pat Damburger	Edmonton, Alberta
1955	Manitoba	Ethel Wright, Norma McLean, Jean McKenzie, Philomene Floch	Winnipeg, Manitoba
1956	British Columbia	Marie McAllister, Betty Tansley, Lois Haddon, Isabel Campbell	Vancouver, British Columbia
1957	British Columbia	Marg Fuller, Pat Good, Sylvia Koster, Edna Quinney	Saskatoon, Saskatchewan
1958	British Columbia	Lois Haddon, Betty Townsley, Isabel Campbell, Ruth Ward,	Calgary, Alberta
1959	Manitoba	Isabelle Ketchen, Doris McFarlane, Isabel Phillips, Ruth McConnell	Brandon, Manitoba
1960	Saskatchewan	Joyce McKee, Sylvia Fedoruk, Donna Belding, Muriel Coben	Victoria, British Columbia
