= 1964 Diamond D Championship =

Canadian women's curling championship

1964 Diamond "D" Championship
- Host city: Edmonton, Alberta
- Arena: Sportex
- Dates: February 24–28
- Attendance: ~4,000
- Winner: British Columbia
- Curling club: Kimberley CC, Kimberley
- Skip: Ina Hansen
- Third: Ada Calles
- Second: Isabel Leith
- Lead: May Shaw

The 1964 Diamond "D" Championship the Canadian women's curling championship was held from February 24 to 28, 1964 at the Sportex in Edmonton, Alberta.

Team British Columbia, who was skipped by Ina Hansen won the event by finishing the round robin with an 8–1 record. This was British Columbia's second championship, with their previous title coming two years earlier in 1962, which was also skipped by Hansen. Hansen became the first skip in Canadian women's curling championship history to have won two championships.

Both Alberta and Nova Scotia finished tied for second with 6–3 records, necessitating a tiebreaker playoff for second place. Alberta would go on to beat Nova Scotia 7-4 in the tiebreaker to capture runner-up honors.

The Newfoundland rink had the dubious distinction of becoming the first team ever to finish round robin play winless.

== Teams ==
The teams are listed as follows:

Alberta	British Columbia	Manitoba	New Brunswick	Newfoundland
Dawson Creek Ladies CC, Dawson Creek, BC Skip: Mickey Down; Third: Sheila McKenzie; Second: Bernice Ashlee; Lead: Joanne Bennett	Kimberley CC, Kimberley Skip: Ina Hansen; Third: Ada Calles; Second: Isabel Leith; Lead: May Shaw	Carman CC, Carman Skip: Myrtle McGregor; Third: Isabelle Park; Second: Norma Coles; Lead: Helen Brechin	Bathurst CC, Bathurst Skip: Joan Callaghan; Third: Anne Orser; Second: Shirley Pilson; Lead: Geraldine Lenihan	St. John's CC, St. John's CC Skip: Marjorie Rockwell; Third: Jeanette Blair; Second: Elsie May; Lead: Kay Knight
Nova Scotia	Ontario	Prince Edward Island	Quebec	Saskatchewan
Halifax Ladies CC, Halifax Skip: Irene Snow; Third: Jean Nickerson; Second: Helen Duffus; Lead: Ruth Lewis	Royal Canadian Navy CC, Ottawa Skip: Helen Hanright; Third: Lyllis Fulton; Second: Louise Denny; Lead: Russ Manning	Montague CC, Montague Skip: Mary Nicholson; Third: Edith Clay; Second: Connie Ings; Lead: Evelyn Cudmore	Mount Royal Ladies CC, Mount Royal Skip: Anne Phillips; Third: Phillippa Jane Tanton; Second: Alice Roberts; Lead: Isabel Campbell	Caledonian CC, Regina Skip: Janet Perkin; Third: Kay Krug; Second: Joyce Miller; Lead: Doreen Thomas

== Map of teams ==
Provincial Winners

== Round robin standings ==
Final Round Robin standings

Key
Diamond D champion
Teams to Tiebreaker

Province	Skip	W	L	PF	PA
British Columbia	Ina Hansen	8	1	99	50
Nova Scotia	Irene Snow	6	3	81	80
Alberta	Mickey Down	6	3	80	53
Manitoba	Myrtle McGregor	5	4	92	69
Saskatchewan	Janet Perkin	5	4	86	69
Ontario	Helen Hanright	5	4	64	80
New Brunswick	Joan Callaghan	4	5	73	81
Quebec	Anne Phillips	4	5	66	80
Prince Edward Island	Mary Nicholson	2	7	63	97
Newfoundland	Marjorie Rockwell	0	9	59	104

== Round robin results ==
All draw times are listed in Mountain Standard Time (UTC−07:00).

=== Draw 1 ===
Monday, February 24, 3:00 pm

Team	1	2	3	4	5	6	7	8	9	10	Final
Newfoundland (Rockwell)	0	2	3	0	1	1	0	0	0	0	7
British Columbia (Hansen)	2	0	0	3	0	0	1	1	2	5	14

Team	1	2	3	4	5	6	7	8	9	10	Final
Saskatchewan (Perkin)	1	0	3	3	0	1	1	1	1	X	11
Quebec (Phillips)	0	2	0	0	2	0	0	0	0	X	4

Team	1	2	3	4	5	6	7	8	9	10	Final
Nova Scotia (Snow)	1	3	0	0	0	1	0	2	0	0	7
Ontario (Hanright)	0	0	1	1	3	0	2	0	1	3	11

Team	1	2	3	4	5	6	7	8	9	10	Final
Alberta (Down)	3	0	1	0	1	0	0	1	0	3	9
Manitoba (McGregor)	0	1	0	2	0	2	0	0	3	0	8

Team	1	2	3	4	5	6	7	8	9	10	Final
New Brunswick (Callaghan)	1	3	0	1	0	3	0	0	3	0	11
Prince Edward Island (Nicholson)	0	0	1	0	3	0	2	2	0	1	9

=== Draw 2 ===
Monday, February 24, 8:00 pm

Team	1	2	3	4	5	6	7	8	9	10	Final
British Columbia (Hansen)	0	1	0	2	0	3	1	3	0	1	11
Quebec (Phillips)	0	0	2	0	1	0	0	0	1	0	4

Team	1	2	3	4	5	6	7	8	9	10	Final
New Brunswick (Callaghan)	0	2	0	2	0	1	4	0	4	0	13
Newfoundland (Rockwell)	1	0	2	0	1	0	0	1	0	2	7

Team	1	2	3	4	5	6	7	8	9	10	Final
Saskatchewan (Perkin)	0	3	1	0	0	4	0	0	0	0	8
Manitoba (McGregor)	1	0	0	1	1	0	4	2	1	2	12

Team	1	2	3	4	5	6	7	8	9	10	Final
Ontario (Hanright)	0	2	0	2	3	1	1	0	3	0	12
Prince Edward Island (Nicholson)	1	0	2	0	0	0	0	1	0	1	5

Team	1	2	3	4	5	6	7	8	9	10	11	Final
Alberta (Down)	0	0	1	2	2	0	0	0	1	1	0	7
Nova Scotia (Snow)	2	1	0	0	0	1	2	1	0	0	2	9

=== Draw 3 ===
Tuesday, February 25, 9:00 am

Team	1	2	3	4	5	6	7	8	9	10	Final
British Columbia (Hansen)	2	1	3	1	2	2	0	3	0	2	16
Nova Scotia (Snow)	0	0	0	0	0	0	2	0	1	0	3

Team	1	2	3	4	5	6	7	8	9	10	Final
Saskatchewan (Perkin)	1	1	0	2	1	1	0	3	4	X	13
Ontario (Hanright)	0	0	0	0	0	0	1	0	0	X	1

Team	1	2	3	4	5	6	7	8	9	10	Final
Quebec (Phillips)	1	0	0	3	0	0	0	1	2	1	8
New Brunswick (Callaghan)	0	3	2	0	3	1	1	0	0	0	10

Team	1	2	3	4	5	6	7	8	9	10	Final
Manitoba (McGregor)	0	1	0	4	1	0	4	0	0	3	13
Newfoundland (Rockwell)	1	0	4	0	0	1	0	1	2	0	9

Team	1	2	3	4	5	6	7	8	9	10	Final
Alberta (Down)	2	0	1	1	0	3	3	2	0	X	12
Prince Edward Island (Nicholson)	0	1	0	0	2	0	0	0	1	X	4

=== Draw 4 ===
Tuesday, February 25, 8:00 pm

Team	1	2	3	4	5	6	7	8	9	10	Final
Manitoba (McGregor)	0	4	0	0	2	0	0	1	0	2	9
Nova Scotia (Snow)	2	0	1	4	0	2	1	0	1	0	11

Team	1	2	3	4	5	6	7	8	9	10	Final
Saskatchewan (Perkin)	1	2	3	1	0	3	1	1	0	2	14
New Brunswick (Callaghan)	0	0	0	0	2	0	0	0	4	0	6

Team	1	2	3	4	5	6	7	8	9	10	Final
British Columbia (Hansen)	1	1	2	0	1	1	2	3	0	X	11
Ontario (Hanright)	0	0	0	1	0	0	0	0	1	X	2

Team	1	2	3	4	5	6	7	8	9	10	Final
Prince Edward Island (Nicholson)	2	1	0	2	0	1	0	0	3	1	10
Newfoundland (Rockwell)	0	0	4	0	1	0	1	1	0	0	7

Team	1	2	3	4	5	6	7	8	9	10	Final
Alberta (Down)	2	0	0	1	0	2	1	1	0	2	9
Quebec (Phillips)	0	2	1	0	2	0	0	0	1	0	6

=== Draw 5 ===
Wednesday, February 26, 10:30 am

Team	1	2	3	4	5	6	7	8	9	10	Final
Alberta (Down)	2	0	3	0	2	4	0	0	4	X	15
Saskatchewan (Perkin)	0	0	0	1	0	0	1	0	0	X	2

Team	1	2	3	4	5	6	7	8	9	10	Final
British Columbia (Hansen)	2	0	4	0	2	2	1	0	1	X	12
Prince Edward Island (Nicholson)	0	1	0	1	0	0	0	2	0	X	4

Team	1	2	3	4	5	6	7	8	9	10	Final
Manitoba (McGregor)	1	3	0	4	2	1	1	0	3	X	15
Ontario (Hanright)	0	0	1	0	0	0	0	1	0	X	2

Team	1	2	3	4	5	6	7	8	9	10	Final
Quebec (Phillips)	2	2	0	1	0	1	0	1	1	3	11
Newfoundland (Rockwell)	0	0	2	0	1	0	1	0	0	0	4

Team	1	2	3	4	5	6	7	8	9	10	11	Final
New Brunswick (Callaghan)	0	1	0	1	0	0	1	0	1	1	0	5
Nova Scotia (Snow)	1	0	1	0	1	1	0	1	0	0	1	6

=== Draw 6 ===
Wednesday, February 26, 3:00 pm

Team	1	2	3	4	5	6	7	8	9	10	Final
Nova Scotia (Snow)	2	3	0	0	0	1	0	3	0	0	9
Newfoundland (Rockwell)	0	0	1	1	1	0	1	0	1	1	6

Team	1	2	3	4	5	6	7	8	9	10	Final
British Columbia (Hansen)	1	0	3	0	1	0	0	0	1	3	9
Saskatchewan (Perkin)	0	3	0	1	0	0	2	1	0	0	7

Team	1	2	3	4	5	6	7	8	9	10	Final
Manitoba (McGregor)	4	0	3	1	0	1	0	3	0	X	12
Prince Edward Island (Nicholson)	0	1	0	0	1	0	1	0	1	X	4

Team	1	2	3	4	5	6	7	8	9	10	Final
Alberta (Down)	0	1	2	1	0	1	3	0	1	1	10
New Brunswick (Callaghan)	1	0	0	0	1	0	0	4	0	0	6

Team	1	2	3	4	5	6	7	8	9	10	Final
Quebec (Phillips)	0	0	0	2	0	3	0	2	1	1	9
Ontario (Hanright)	1	1	1	0	1	0	3	0	0	0	7

=== Draw 7 ===
Wednesday, February 26, 8:00 pm

Team	1	2	3	4	5	6	7	8	9	10	Final
Saskatchewan (Perkin)	0	2	0	2	0	0	1	0	4	0	9
Prince Edward Island (Nicholson)	1	0	1	0	1	2	0	3	0	2	10

Team	1	2	3	4	5	6	7	8	9	10	Final
Quebec (Phillips)	0	0	2	0	0	2	1	0	2	X	7
Nova Scotia (Snow)	4	3	0	2	3	0	0	3	0	X	15

Team	1	2	3	4	5	6	7	8	9	10	Final
Ontario (Hanright)	1	0	0	0	6	0	0	2	1	3	13
Newfoundland (Rockwell)	0	1	4	1	0	2	1	0	0	0	9

Team	1	2	3	4	5	6	7	8	9	10	Final
British Columbia (Hansen)	0	1	1	1	2	0	1	0	0	X	6
Alberta (Down)	1	0	0	0	0	1	0	1	1	X	4

Team	1	2	3	4	5	6	7	8	9	10	Final
Manitoba (McGregor)	0	1	0	2	1	0	0	1	2	3	10
New Brunswick (Callaghan)	1	0	2	0	0	1	1	0	0	0	5

=== Draw 8 ===
Thursday, February 27, 9:00 am

Team	1	2	3	4	5	6	7	8	9	10	Final
Saskatchewan (Perkin)	0	4	1	2	0	1	0	0	2	0	10
Nova Scotia (Snow)	1	0	0	0	2	0	3	1	0	1	8

Team	1	2	3	4	5	6	7	8	9	10	Final
British Columbia (Hansen)	3	0	1	1	0	2	4	0	0	2	13
Manitoba (McGregor)	0	1	0	0	3	0	0	1	3	0	8

Team	1	2	3	4	5	6	7	8	9	10	Final
Ontario (Hanright)	1	0	2	1	1	3	1	0	0	1	10
New Brunswick (Callaghan)	0	3	0	0	0	0	0	1	2	0	6

Team	1	2	3	4	5	6	7	8	9	10	Final
Alberta (Down)	0	2	1	0	1	0	3	1	0	1	9
Newfoundland (Rockwell)	1	0	0	3	0	1	0	0	1	0	6

Team	1	2	3	4	5	6	7	8	9	10	Final
Quebec (Phillips)	0	1	1	1	2	0	1	2	1	0	9
Prince Edward Island (Nicholson)	1	0	0	0	0	5	0	0	0	2	8

=== Draw 9 ===
Thursday, February 27, 8:00 pm

Team	1	2	3	4	5	6	7	8	9	10	Final
Nova Scotia (Snow)	2	0	0	1	0	2	4	2	0	2	13
Prince Edward Island (Nicholson)	0	2	2	0	2	0	0	0	3	0	9

Team	1	2	3	4	5	6	7	8	9	10	Final
British Columbia (Hansen)	0	1	3	0	1	0	1	0	0	1	7
New Brunswick (Callaghan)	3	0	0	1	0	1	0	2	4	0	11

Team	1	2	3	4	5	6	7	8	9	10	Final
Saskatchewan (Perkin)	1	1	0	2	1	2	0	4	0	1	12
Newfoundland (Rockwell)	0	0	1	0	0	0	1	0	2	0	4

Team	1	2	3	4	5	6	7	8	9	10	Final
Alberta (Down)	0	0	1	0	1	1	2	0	0	0	5
Ontario (Hanright)	1	1	0	1	0	0	0	1	1	1	6

Team	1	2	3	4	5	6	7	8	9	10	Final
Manitoba (McGregor)	0	0	0	2	0	1	1	1	0	0	5
Quebec (Phillips)	1	1	1	0	3	0	0	0	1	1	8

== Tiebreaker ==
Friday, February 28, 9:00 am

Team	1	2	3	4	5	6	7	8	9	10	Final
Alberta (Down)	0	1	1	0	1	0	2	2	0	X	7
Nova Scotia (Snow)	1	0	0	1	0	1	0	0	1	X	4
