= 1960 Diamond D Championship =

1960 Diamond "D" Championship
- Host city: Oshawa, Ontario
- Arena: Oshawa Curling rink
- Dates: March 25
- Winner: West
- Curling club: Hub City CC, Saskatoon
- Skip: Joyce McKee
- Third: Sylvia Fedoruk
- Second: Donna Belding
- Lead: Muriel Coben
- Finalist: East (Ruth Smith)

The 1960 Diamond "D" Championship, the Canadian women's curling championship was an invitational curling tournament held to determine Canada's national women's curling champions that year. It was held on March 25 at the Oshawa Curling rink in Oshawa, Ontario.

The tournament was a best of three series held between the champion teams from Western and Eastern Canada. Team West, skipped by Joyce McKee of Saskatchewan easily won the series, 2 games to none, over the Eastern Canadian champion Ruth Smith rink of Quebec.

The event was held as a forerunner of the first official national championship which would be held the following year.

The event was announced in November 1959, and was sponsored by Dominion Stores Ltd. The winning team was to receive gold brooches with diamonds, while the runner up rink was to receive silver brooches with diamonds.

The event was held immediately after the Eastern Canadian championship, which was held March 22 to 24.

== Results ==
Game 1 consisted of a 12 end match, while game 2 only consisted of 10 ends.

=== Game 1 ===
Team	1	2	3	4	5	6	7	8	9	10	11	12	Final
West (McKee)	1	0	0	3	4	0	3	0	0	0	0	0	11
East (Smith)	0	1	0	0	0	1	0	0	1	0	0	0	3

=== Game 2 ===
Team	1	2	3	4	5	6	7	8	9	10	Final
West (McKee)	0	3	0	3	0	0	0	2	0	0	8
East (Smith)	1	0	1	0	0	2	0	0	1	0	5

== Qualifying ==
=== Western Canada ===
The Western Canada Women's Curling Championship was held from March 14 to 17 at the Victoria Curling Club in Victoria, British Columbia.

Team Saskatchewan, who was skipped by Joyce McKee won the double round robin event with a 5–1 record. It was the eighth and final Western Canadian Women's Championship.

All games during the Western Canadian Championship were scheduled for 12 ends.

==== Teams ====
The teams are listed as follows:

Alberta
Edmonton

Skip: Dorothy Thompson
Third: Elinor Myers
Second: Ila Watson
Lead: Vivian Kortgaard

British Columbia
Vancouver

Skip: Irene Fraser
Third: Vivienne Chatenay
Second: Jessie McLeod
Lead: Diana Lawrence

Manitoba
Flin Flon

Skip: Isabelle Ketchen
Third: Doris McFarlane
Second: Isabel Phillips
Lead: Ruth McConnell

Saskatchewan
Saskatoon

Skip: Joyce McKee
Third: Sylvia Fedoruk
Second: Donna Belding
Lead: Muriel Coben

==== Standings ====
Province	Skip	W	L
Saskatchewan	Joyce McKee	5	1
Alberta	Dorothy Thompson	4	2
Manitoba	Isabelle Ketchen	2	4
British Columbia	Irene Fraser	1	5

==== Results ====
Draw times are listed in Pacific Standard Time (UTC-8:00).

===== Draw 1 =====
Monday, March 14, 1:30 pm

Team	1	2	3	4	5	6	7	8	9	10	11	12	Final
Manitoba (Ketchen)	1	1	0	3	1	0	0	1	0	1	0	1	8
Saskatchewan (McKee)	0	0	2	0	0	1	3	0	1	0	0	0	7

Team	1	2	3	4	5	6	7	8	9	10	11	12	Final
Alberta (Thompson)	0	1	0	2	0	4	3	0	3	0	3	X	16
British Columbia (Fraser)	3	0	1	0	1	0	0	3	0	2	0	X	10

===== Draw 2 =====
Monday, March 14, 7:30 pm

Team	1	2	3	4	5	6	7	8	9	10	11	12	Final
Manitoba (Ketchen)	0	0	2	0	0	0	1	0	0	0	X	X	3
Alberta (Thompson)	3	1	0	6	2	2	0	4	1	1	X	X	20

Team	1	2	3	4	5	6	7	8	9	10	11	12	Final
Saskatchewan (McKee)	2	0	2	2	1	2	0	2	0	0	0	0	11
British Columbia (Fraser)	0	1	0	0	0	0	1	0	1	0	2	2	7

===== Draw 3 =====
Tuesday, March 15, 9:00 am

Team	1	2	3	4	5	6	7	8	9	10	11	12	Final
Manitoba (Ketchen)	1	0	1	1	0	3	0	0	2	1	2	0	11
British Columbia (Fraser)	0	2	0	0	2	0	2	1	0	0	0	1	8

Team	1	2	3	4	5	6	7	8	9	10	11	12	Final
Saskatchewan (McKee)	1	0	1	1	0	2	1	2	0	0	0	0	8
Alberta (Thompson)	0	1	0	0	1	0	0	0	2	1	1	1	7

===== Draw 4 =====
Wednesday, March 16, 9:00 am

Team	1	2	3	4	5	6	7	8	9	10	11	12	Final
British Columbia (Fraser)	0	1	0	0	1	0	2	0	0	1	0	X	5
Alberta (Thompson)	2	0	1	2	0	1	0	1	3	0	1	X	11

Team	1	2	3	4	5	6	7	8	9	10	11	12	Final
Saskatchewan (McKee)	3	0	0	1	2	0	1	1	1	0	0	0	9
Manitoba (Ketchen)	0	1	3	0	0	1	0	0	0	1	1	1	8

===== Draw 5 =====
Wednesday, March 16, 7:30 pm

Team	1	2	3	4	5	6	7	8	9	10	11	12	Final
Manitoba (Ketchen)	0	3	0	2	0	0	1	1	0	1	0	X	8
Alberta (Thompson)	1	0	2	0	3	2	0	0	2	0	6	X	16

Team	1	2	3	4	5	6	7	8	9	10	11	12	Final
Saskatchewan (McKee)	0	1	2	0	0	2	2	0	1	0	4	X	12
British Columbia (Fraser)	0	0	0	1	2	0	0	1	0	1	0	X	5

===== Draw 6 =====
Thursday, March 17, 9:00 am

Team	1	2	3	4	5	6	7	8	9	10	11	12	Final
Manitoba (Ketchen)	0	1	1	0	1	0	1	0	0	3	0	1	8
British Columbia (Fraser)	5	0	0	1	0	3	0	2	2	0	1	0	14

Team	1	2	3	4	5	6	7	8	9	10	11	12	Final
Alberta (Thompson)	2	0	3	0	2	0	1	0	2	0	1	0	11
Saskatchewan (McKee)	0	3	0	3	0	4	0	1	0	1	0	2	14

=== Eastern Canada ===
Team Quebec, consisting of Ruth Smith, Shirley Fewster, Margaret Dawson and Lydia Hope of Lacolle won the Eastern Canadian championship held March 22 to 24, just before the national final in Oshawa.

All games in the Eastern Canadian Championship were scheduled for 10 ends.

==== Teams ====
The teams are listed as follows:

New Brunswick
Moncton

Skip: Mona Comeau
Third: Kay Cormack
Second: Verna Shutt
Lead: Evelyn Brooks

Nova Scotia
Liverpool

Skip: Marge Harris
Third: Audrey Thorbourne
Second: Dot Rowding
Lead: Effie Laws

Ontario
Port Arthur CC, Port Arthur

Skip: Elsie Forsyth
Third: Helen Morgan
Second: Anne Brown
Lead: Ina Oikonen

Prince Edward Island
Charlottetown

Skip: Pauline Bruden
Third: Gladys Carruthers
Second: Fran Whitlock
Lead: Shirley Carr

Quebec
Lacolle

Skip: Ruth Smith
Third: Shirley Fewster
Second: Margaret Dawson
Lead: Lydia Hope

==== Standings ====
Province	Skip	W	L
Quebec	Ruth Smith	4	0
Ontario	Elsie Forsyth	3	1
New Brunswick	Mona Comeau	2	2
Prince Edward Island	Pauline Bruden	1	3
Nova Scotia	Marge Harris	0	4

==== Results ====
===== Draw 1 =====
Tuesday, March 22

Team	1	2	3	4	5	6	7	8	9	10	Final
Ontario (Forsyth)	0	0	0	2	0	1	0	1	2	0	6
Quebec (Smith)	1	4	1	0	2	0	2	0	0	2	12

Team	1	2	3	4	5	6	7	8	9	10	Final
Prince Edward Island (Bruden)	1	1	1	0	1	0	0	0	3	0	7
Nova Scotia (Harris)	0	0	0	1	0	1	1	1	0	1	5

===== Draw 2 =====
Tuesday, March 22

Team	1	2	3	4	5	6	7	8	9	10	Final
New Brunswick (Comeau)	0	2	1	0	2	1	1	3	0	0	10
Prince Edward Island (Bruden)	1	0	0	3	0	0	0	0	1	1	6

Team	1	2	3	4	5	6	7	8	9	10	Final
Ontario (Forsyth)	0	3	0	0	2	4	0	0	1	1	11
Nova Scotia (Harris)	1	0	1	1	0	0	2	2	0	0	7

===== Draw 3 =====
Wednesday, March 23

Team	1	2	3	4	5	6	7	8	9	10	Final
Quebec (Smith)	1	0	0	1	0	1	0	1	2	2	8
Prince Edward Island (Bruden)	0	2	1	0	3	0	1	0	0	0	7

Team	1	2	3	4	5	6	7	8	9	10	Final
Nova Scotia (Harris)	1	0	0	1	0	2	0	0	0	X	4
New Brunswick (Comeau)	0	3	1	0	2	0	2	3	3	X	14

===== Draw 4 =====
Wednesday, March 23

Team	1	2	3	4	5	6	7	8	9	10	Final
Quebec (Smith)	1	0	0	1	0	0	0	2	0	5	9
New Brunswick (Comeau)	0	1	2	0	1	2	1	0	1	0	8

Team	1	2	3	4	5	6	7	8	9	10	Final
Ontario (Forsyth)	1	2	2	0	0	2	3	0	2	0	12
Prince Edward Island (Bruden)	0	0	0	4	1	0	0	1	0	1	7

===== Draw 5 =====
Thursday, March 24

Team	1	2	3	4	5	6	7	8	9	10	Final
Quebec (Smith)	1	1	0	0	3	0	0	1	0	3	9
Nova Scotia (Harris)	0	0	1	1	0	2	2	0	2	0	8

Team	1	2	3	4	5	6	7	8	9	10	Final
Ontario (Forsyth)	0	0	1	3	1	0	0	3	1	0	9
New Brunswick (Comeau)	2	2	0	0	0	1	1	0	0	1	7
