= Janet Anderson Perkin =

Canadian baseball player

Janet Anderson
- Pitcher/Outfield
- Born: November 21, 1921; Montreal, Quebec, Canada
- Died: March 30, 2012 (aged 90); Regina, Saskatchewan, Canada
- Batted: Right Threw: Right

Teams
- Kenosha Comets (1946)

Career highlights and awards
- Canadian Baseball Hall of Fame honorary induction (1998); Women in Baseball – AAGPBL Permanent Display at Baseball Hall of Fame and Museum (1988)

Janet Margaret Anderson (later Perkin; November 21, 1921 – March 30, 2012) was a Canadian pitcher and outfielder who played in the All-American Girls Professional Baseball League (AAGPBL) during the 1946 season. She batted and threw right handed. Anderson was one of the 68 players born in Canada to join the All-American Girls Professional Baseball League in its twelve years history.

Born in Montreal, Quebec, Janet was the daughter of Tom and Mary Anderson. She grew up in Bethune, Saskatchewan, where she went on to become a teacher. She was spotted by an AAGPBL scout who signed her to a contract. She later attended the spring training camp held at Pascagoula, Mississippi, and was assigned to the Kenosha Comets. She had an unfortunate career in the league, posting a 0–6 record in 10 pitching appearances while connecting a .173 batting average in 36 games.

After baseball, she worked for Allied Van Lines moving company and in her spare time enjoyed bowling. She married Max Perkin, and they had two children, Jean and Thomas. She also was a member of the 1954 Regina Govins softball club.

A long time resident of Regina, she curled under her married name of Janet Perkin. As a skip, she could be counted on to guide her rink in style, winning the first Western Canada Women's Curling Championship in 1953, and three provincial champion teams in 1953, 1959 and 1964.

For her accomplishments, she was elected to several Halls of Fame: Canadian Baseball (1998), Saskatchewan Curling Association (2004), Saskatchewan Sports (curling, 2005) and Regina Sports (softball, 2008).

In addition, she received life membership in the Saskatchewan Ladies Curling Association in 1992. Then, in 2004 her 1953 team was named to the Saskatchewan Legends of Curling Honour Roll. In 1988, she received further recognition when she became part of Women in Baseball, a permanent display based at the Baseball Hall of Fame and Museum in Cooperstown, New York, which was unveiled to honour the entire All-American Girls Professional Baseball League. Janet Anderson Perkin died in Regina, Saskatchewan, at the age of 90.

== Career statistics ==
Batting

GP	AB	R	H	2B	3B	HR	RBI	SB	TB	BB	SO	BA	OBP	SLG
36	75	5	13	0	2	0	2	2	17	10	12	.173	.271	.227
