= Sylvia Fedoruk Canadian Centre for Nuclear Innovation =

Research institute in Saskatoon, Canada

- Established: 2011
- Research type: Nuclear Science
- Field of research: Nuclear Physics
- Director: John Root
- Location: Saskatoon, Saskatchewan, Canada
- Website: http://www.fedorukcentre.ca/

The Sylvia Fedoruk Canadian Centre for Nuclear Innovation (Fedoruk Centre) is an institute located in Saskatoon, Saskatchewan, Canada that was established by the University of Saskatchewan in 2011 as the Canadian Centre for Nuclear Innovation (CCNI). The Fedoruk Centre does not have a mandate to conduct research itself. Instead, it acts as a conduit to fund nuclear released research projects in Saskatchewan and to oversee the operation of nuclear facilities on the university campus such as the universities cyclotron facility. The Fedoruk Centre is involved in funding research in the nuclear medicine, materials science, nuclear energy systems including small reactor design, and environmental and social topics related to nuclear technology. On October 3, 2012, the name of the organization was changed from the Canadian Centre for Nuclear Innovation to the Sylvia Fedoruk Canadian Centre for Nuclear Innovation in honour of Sylvia Fedoruk who did pioneering work in the treatment of cancer using cobalt-60 radiation therapy in the 1950s.

The centre builds on other nuclear and accelerator related facilities already on the university campus that include the Saskatchewan Accelerator Laboratory, Canadian Light Source, SLOWPOKE reactor operated by the Saskatchewan Research Council, and the STOR-M tokamak.

The centre received an initial $30 million (CDN) in funding to advance research, innovation and training in four areas:

- Advance nuclear medicine and knowledge,
- Develop better materials for widespread applications (energy, health, environment, manufacturing, etc.),
- Improve safety and other engineering of nuclear energy systems, and
- Managing the risks and benefits of nuclear technology for society and our environment.

The Fedoruk Centre will be responsible for the operations of a $25 million cyclotron facility being installed in a renovated a building between the Canadian Light Source and the Western College of Veterinary Medicine to be completed in 2014. The 24 MeV cyclotron will produce radioisotopes for medical imaging research and clinical use, including the province's PET-CT scanners.

When the centre was formed some controversy existed over the governance and independence of the organization with only two board members appointed by the university while the other members have strong ties to the nuclear industry. In fact, all members of the Fedoruk Centre's Board of Directors are appointed by the University of Saskatchewan's Board of Governors. Two members are nominated by the Province of Saskatchewan, two by the University of Saskatchewan, with the remainder sought out by the Fedoruk Centre's Board and elected by the Board of Governors.
