= 1958 Western Canada Women's Curling Championship =

- Host city: Calgary, Alberta
- Arena: North Hill Curling Club
- Dates: March 11–13
- Winner: British Columbia
- Curling club: Vancouver Curling Club, Vancouver
- Skip: Lois Haddon
- Third: Betty Tansley
- Second: Isabel Campbell
- Lead: Ruth Ward

The 1958 T. Eaton Company Western Canada Women's Curling Championship was held to March 11 to 13, 1958 at the North Hill Curling Club in Calgary, Alberta. The winning team received the Eaton Trophy.

British Columbia won its third straight Western Canadian Championship, defeating Alberta 9–8 in a playoff after both teams finished the rouble round robin with identical 4–2 records. In the playoff, British Columbia, skipped by Lois Haddon defeated Alberta, skipped by Ethel Lees, 9–8. B.C. got off to great store by scoring a 5-ender in the second, and had a 7–2 lead after six. Alberta rallied back to bring them within a point after 11 ends. In the 12th and final end, Lees took out an Alberta biter on her last, blanking the end, and winning the game.

== Teams ==
The teams are listed as follows:

Alberta
Red Deer

Skip: Ethel Lees
Third: Mabel Johnson
Second: Marg Humber
Lead: Kay MacPhail

British Columbia
Vancouver

Skip: Lois Haddon
Third: Betty Tansley
Second: Isabel Campbell
Lead: Ruth Ward

Manitoba
Winnipeg

Skip: Esther Poulton
Third: May Graham
Second: Mary Chalmers
Lead: Dorothy Starr

Saskatchewan
Yorkton

Skip: Donna Matthews
Third: Ella Baker
Second: Alice Park
Lead: Rita Davidson

== Standings ==
Final standings

Key
Teams to Playoff

Province	Skip	W	L
British Columbia	Lois Haddon	4	2
Alberta	Ethel Lees	4	2
Manitoba	Esther Poulton	2	4
Saskatchewan	Donna Matthews	2	4

== Scores ==
Draw times are listed in Mountain Standard Time (UTC-7:00).

=== Draw 1 ===
March 11, 10:00am

Team	1	2	3	4	5	6	7	8	9	10	11	12	Final
Saskatchewan (Matthews)	2	1	0	0	0	0	3	0	0	2	2	3	13
Manitoba (Poulton)	0	0	2	1	1	1	0	2	1	0	0	0	8

Team	1	2	3	4	5	6	7	8	9	10	11	12	Final
British Columbia (Haddon)	0	0	0	0	1	0	0	0	0	1	0	2	4
Alberta (Lees)	1	0	0	0	0	2	0	1	1	0	2	0	7

=== Draw 2 ===
March 11, 2:00pm

Team	1	2	3	4	5	6	7	8	9	10	11	12	Final
Alberta (Lees)	1	0	0	3	0	0	2	0	3	1	1	X	11
Saskatchewan (Matthews)	0	1	1	0	2	1	0	1	0	0	0	X	6

Team	1	2	3	4	5	6	7	8	9	10	11	12	Final
British Columbia (Haddon)	1	0	0	3	2	0	0	3	0	0	0	1	10
Manitoba (Poulton)	0	2	1	0	0	1	1	0	1	1	2	0	9

=== Draw 3 ===
March 12, 10:00am

Team	1	2	3	4	5	6	7	8	9	10	11	12	Final
Saskatchewan (Matthews)	0	0	1	0	1	0	2	0	0	1	0	1	6
British Columbia (Haddon)	0	1	0	2	0	1	0	3	1	0	2	0	10

Team	1	2	3	4	5	6	7	8	9	10	11	12	Final
Alberta (Lees)	2	0	1	2	0	0	0	4	1	0	0	0	10
Manitoba (Poulton)	0	1	0	0	1	1	2	0	0	1	1	2	9

=== Draw 4 ===
March 12, 2:00pm

Team	1	2	3	4	5	6	7	8	9	10	11	12	Final
British Columbia (Haddon)	0	1	1	2	0	3	0	2	1	1	1	X	12
Alberta (Lees)	1	0	0	0	2	0	1	0	0	0	0	X	4

Team	1	2	3	4	5	6	7	8	9	10	11	12	Final
Manitoba (Poulton)	1	0	0	2	2	0	3	2	0	1	0	1	12
Saskatchewan (Matthews)	0	1	2	0	0	1	0	0	1	0	4	0	9

=== Draw 5 ===
March 12, 8:00pm

Team	1	2	3	4	5	6	7	8	9	10	11	12	Final
Saskatchewan (Matthews)	0	0	5	0	0	1	0	0	1	2	0	0	10
Alberta (Lees)	1	0	0	2	0	0	1	1	0	0	1	0	6

Team	1	2	3	4	5	6	7	8	9	10	11	12	Final
British Columbia (Haddon)	0	1	0	1	0	0	1	0	0	2	1	0	6
Manitoba (Poulton)	2	0	1	0	4	1	0	1	0	0	0	5	14

=== Draw 6 ===
March 13, 9:00am

Team	1	2	3	4	5	6	7	8	9	10	11	12	Final
Alberta (Lees)	1	1	3	0	0	0	1	0	0	1	0	3	10
Manitoba (Poulton)	0	0	0	2	1	2	0	1	1	0	1	0	8

Team	1	2	3	4	5	6	7	8	9	10	11	12	Final
British Columbia (Haddon)	1	1	1	1	1	0	0	1	1	0	1	X	8
Saskatchewan (Matthews)	0	0	0	0	0	1	2	0	0	2	0	X	5

=== Playoff ===
March 13, afternoon

Team	1	2	3	4	5	6	7	8	9	10	11	12	Final
Alberta (Lees)	1	0	0	0	0	1	3	0	0	2	1	0	8
British Columbia (Haddon)	0	5	1	1	0	0	0	1	1	0	0	0	9
