= Muriel Coben =

Canadian baseball player

- Pitcher
- Born: February 17, 1921; Gelert, Ontario, Canada
- Died: June 8, 1979 (aged 58); Saskatoon, Saskatchewan, Canada
- Batted: Right Threw: Right

Teams
- South Bend Blue Sox (1943); Rockford Peaches (1943)

Career highlights and awards
- Canadian Baseball Hall of Fame induction (1998); Saskatchewan Baseball Hall of Fame (1991); Women in Baseball – AAGPBL Permanent Display at Baseball Hall of Fame and Museum (1988)

Muriel Eleanor Coben (February 17, 1921 – June 8, 1979) was a Canadian pitcher who played in the All-American Girls Professional Baseball League (AAGPBL). Listed at 5' 3", 135 lb., she batted and threw right handed.

Muriel Coben was one of the 68 players born in Canada to join the All-American Girls Professional Baseball League in its twelve-year history. She also became one of the original 60 founding members of the league in its 1943 inaugural season.

Coben has been considered by researchers as the greatest softball pitcher of her era in Saskatchewan history. She led her teams to numerous regional, provincial and national championships in Canada in a career that lasted 18 years. In addition, she was a member of a Canadian women's curling champion team and has been enshrined in several Halls of Fame in recognition of her outstanding contribution to Canadian sport.

== Biography ==
Born in Gelert, Ontario, Muriel Coben was raised on a farm in Tessier, Saskatchewan. She started her pitching career in 1936, winning all her games as a member of the hometown Tessier Millionaires. She later played from 1938 to 1942 in Saskatoon for the Pats team, where she aroused the attention of an AAGPBL scout who signed her to a contract to play in the new league during the opening 1943 season.

Coben tried to make the adjustment to the AAGPBL's rules of play, but returned home after one year of struggling. Unfortunately, she suffered one of the worst pitching performances of the year, after posting a combined 4–16 record with the South Bend Blue Sox and Rockford Peaches, while leading the league for the most earned runs allowed (102).

She returned to the Saskatoon Pats in 1944, pitching for them two years before joining the Saskatoon Grey Cab Rambler from 1946 through 1950. In this period, Coben helped the team win three successive Saskatchewan championships (1946–1948) and two Western Canadian championships (1946–1947). In 1950 she moved to Edmonton, Alberta, where she joined the Mortons ball club and aided them in winning the Canadian championship over a very strong Toronto squad in 1952. She then returned to Saskatoon, and again starred with the Ramblers until her playing days were over in 1953.

After retiring from softball, Coben took up curling, playing lead for the Joyce McKee's rink that won the 1960 national women's curling championship after defeating the Quebec squad in two matches, 11–3 and 8–5. Besides McKee [skip] and Coben [lead], the team included Sylvia Fedoruk [third] and Donna (Paton) Belding [second]. The quartet would be inducted into the Saskatoon Sports Hall of Fame in 1987.

Coben also earned individual inductions to multiple Halls of Fame: Saskatchewan Sports (athlete, 1979), Saskatoon Sports (softball, 1986), Saskatchewan Baseball (1991), and Canadian Baseball (1998).

In 1988 she received further recognition when she joined a group of Canadian ballplayers at Women in Baseball, a permanent display based at the Baseball Hall of Fame and Museum in Cooperstown, New York, which was unveiled to honour the entire All-American Girls Professional Baseball League, though the acknowledgment came much later after her death in 1979, in Saskatoon, at the age of 58.

== AAGPBL career statistics ==
Pitching

GP	W	L	W-L%	ERA	IP	H	RA	ER	BB	SO	HBP	WP	WHIP
37	4	16	.200	4.74	193	218	150	102	55	43	7	5	1.41

Batting

GP	AB	R	H	2B	3B	HR	RBI	SB	BB	SO	BA	OBP
34	70	6	10	0	0	0	4	4	2	6	.143	.167

Fielding

GP	PO	A	E	TC	DP	FA
37	21	46	10	77	1	.932
