= 1959 Western Canada Women's Curling Championship =

- Host city: Brandon, Manitoba
- Arena: Brandon Curling Club
- Dates: March 9–12
- Winner: Manitoba
- Curling club: Flin Flon Curling Club, Flin Flon
- Skip: Isabelle Ketchen
- Third: Doris McFarlane
- Second: Isabel Phillips
- Lead: Ruth McConnell
- Finalist: British Columbia (Marge Tegart)

The 1959 Western Canada Women's Curling Championship was held to March 9 to 12 at the Brandon Curling Club in Brandon, Manitoba.

Manitoba, skipped by Isabelle Ketchen won the double round robin event, finishing with a 4–2 record.

Manitoba defeated British Columbia 10–9 in the sixth round to claim the championship. Both teams had identical 3–2 records going into the last draw, meaning the winner would finish in first place. The game came down to the 12th and final end, in which B.C. had the hammer, and were trailing Manitoba 10–8. On her last stone, Ketchen made a freeze to a B.C. stone in the four-foot. B.C. skip Marge Tegart attempted a chip shot on her last, and ended up bumping one of her rocks back to sit one, not enough to tie the game.

Manitoba had a chance to clinch the title in the fifth round, but lost badly to Alberta, 18–4.

== Teams ==
The teams are listed as follows:

Alberta
Edmonton

Skip: Dorothy Thompson
Third: Elinor Myers
Second: Ila Watson
Lead: Vivian Kortgaard

British Columbia
Salmon Arm

Skip: Marge Tegart
Third: Betty Dinning
Second: Stella Thorarinson
Lead: Blanche Nore

Manitoba
Flin Flon

Skip: Isabelle Ketchen
Third: Doris McFarlane
Second: Isabel Phillips
Lead: Ruth McConnell

Saskatchewan
Regina

Skip: Janet Perkin
Third: Win Rodger
Second: Joyce Miller
Lead: Betty Malesh

== Standings ==
Final standings

Province	Skip	W	L
Manitoba	Isabelle Ketchen	4	2
British Columbia	Marge Tegart	3	3
Saskatchewan	Janet Perkin	3	3
Alberta	Dorothy Thompson	2	4

== Scores ==
Draw times are listed in Central Standard Time (UTC-6:00).

=== Draw 1 ===
March 9, 8:30pm

Team	1	2	3	4	5	6	7	8	9	10	11	12	Final
Saskatchewan (Perkin)	0	2	0	1	0	2	1	1	0	1	0	2	10
Manitoba (Ketchen)	1	0	2	0	2	0	0	0	2	0	1	0	8

Team	1	2	3	4	5	6	7	8	9	10	11	12	Final
British Columbia (Tegart)	0	1	0	0	0	1	0	0	2	0	X	X	4
Alberta (Thompson)	3	0	2	2	3	0	2	1	0	5	X	X	18

=== Draw 2 ===
March 10, 10:00am

Team	1	2	3	4	5	6	7	8	9	10	11	12	13	Final
Manitoba (Ketchen)	0	0	1	0	5	0	3	0	1	0	1	0	1	12
Alberta (Thompson)	2	2	0	1	0	2	0	2	0	1	0	1	0	11

Team	1	2	3	4	5	6	7	8	9	10	11	12	Final
Saskatchewan (Perkin)	0	1	0	1	0	0	0	1	0	0	2	1	6
British Columbia (Tegart)	0	0	1	0	1	1	2	0	3	1	0	0	9

=== Draw 3 ===
March 10, 2:00pm

Team	1	2	3	4	5	6	7	8	9	10	11	12	Final
Manitoba (Ketchen)	2	0	3	0	0	1	3	0	1	0	2	X	12
British Columbia (Tegart)	0	1	0	1	2	0	0	1	0	2	0	X	7

Team	1	2	3	4	5	6	7	8	9	10	11	12	Final
Alberta (Thompson)	1	1	0	0	0	0	1	0	0	2	0	X	5
Saskatchewan (Perkin)	0	0	3	1	3	0	0	0	1	0	1	X	9

=== Draw 4 ===
March 11, 10:00am

Team	1	2	3	4	5	6	7	8	9	10	11	12	13	Final
Alberta (Thompson)	1	0	1	0	1	0	1	1	0	1	1	0	0	7
British Columbia (Tegart)	0	1	0	3	0	1	0	0	1	0	0	1	1	8

Team	1	2	3	4	5	6	7	8	9	10	11	12	Final
Saskatchewan (Perkin)	1	1	0	0	1	0	0	4	0	1	1	0	9
Manitoba (Ketchen)	0	0	1	2	0	1	3	0	1	0	0	2	10

=== Draw 5 ===
March 11, 2:00pm

Team	1	2	3	4	5	6	7	8	9	10	11	12	Final
Manitoba (Ketchen)	0	0	0	2	0	1	0	0	0	1	X	X	4
Alberta (Thompson)	3	1	2	0	2	0	3	4	3	0	X	X	18

Team	1	2	3	4	5	6	7	8	9	10	11	12	Final
Saskatchewan (Perkin)	0	1	0	2	2	0	0	0	1	0	0	0	6
British Columbia (Tegart)	1	0	1	0	0	1	1	1	0	1	1	1	8

=== Draw 6 ===
March 12, 10:00am

Team	1	2	3	4	5	6	7	8	9	10	11	12	Final
Manitoba (Ketchen)	1	0	2	0	0	0	1	0	4	0	2	0	10
British Columbia (Tegart)	0	1	0	2	1	1	0	1	0	2	0	1	9

Team	1	2	3	4	5	6	7	8	9	10	11	12	Final
Alberta (Thompson)	0	0	1	1	0	0	1	1	0	1	0	1	6
Saskatchewan (Perkin)	0	1	0	0	3	0	0	0	1	0	3	0	8
