= 1962 Diamond D Championship =

Canadian women's curling championship

1962 Diamond "D" Championship
- Host city: Regina, Saskatchewan
- Arena: Regina Stadium
- Dates: February 26–March 1
- Winner: British Columbia
- Curling club: Kimberley CC, Kimberley
- Skip: Ina Hansen
- Third: Ada Callas
- Second: Isabel Leith
- Lead: May Shaw

The 1962 Diamond "D" Championship the Canadian women's curling championship was held from February 26 to March 1, 1962 at Regina Stadium in Regina, Saskatchewan.

Team British Columbia, who was skipped by Ina Hansen won the event by finishing round robin play unbeaten with a 9-0 record. This was BC's first championship and the first of two skipped by Hansen.

British Columbia's 18-1 win over Newfoundland in Draw 6 set records for most points scored in a game by one team (18) and the largest margin of victory in a game (17). Both these records still stand as of 2022.

Draw 8 was the first time that every game in a single draw did not go at least the full 10 ends.

== Teams ==
The teams are listed as follows:

Alberta	British Columbia	Manitoba	New Brunswick	Newfoundland
Calgary WC, Calgary Skip: Vera Reed; Third: Bernie McKenzie; Second: Phyllis Crist; Lead: Irene Halverson	Kimberley CC, Kimberley Skip: Ina Hansen; Third: Ada Calles; Second: Isabel Leith; Lead: May Shaw	Charleswood CC, Charleswood Skip: Kay Hebert; Third: Roberta Fahrner; Second: Margaret Moon; Lead: Genevieve Frankard	Moncton CA, Moncton Skip: Phyllis Pinder; Third: Pauline Thomas; Second: Jean Dick; Lead: Eleanor Steeves	St. John's CC, St. John's Skip: Marjorie Rockwell; Third: Olive Wylie; Second: Mary Dunne; Lead: Margaret Elton
Nova Scotia	Ontario	Prince Edward Island	Quebec	Saskatchewan
Dartmouth CC, Dartmouth Skip: Pearl Carter; Third: Bertha Stevens; Second: Lynn Morse; Lead: Margaret Angus	St. George's G&CC, Etobicoke Skip: Fern Irwin; Third: Jane Hanna; Second: Elva Law; Lead: Ethel Garland	Charlottetown CC, Charlottetown Skip: Elizabeth MacDonald; Third: Sally Rodd; Second: Evelyn Goss; Lead: Nora MacDonald	Mount Royal CC, Mount Royal Skip: Anne Phillips; Third: Phillippa Tanton; Second: Isabel Campbell; Lead: Elizabeth MacKenzie	Hub City CC, Saskatoon Skip: Joyce McKee; Third: Sylvia Fedoruk; Second: Barbara MacNevin; Lead: Rosa McFee

== Map of teams ==
Provincial Winners

== Round robin standings ==
Key
Diamond D champion

Province	Skip	W	L	PF	PA
British Columbia	Ina Hansen	9	0	98	54
Saskatchewan	Joyce McKee	8	1	101	48
Quebec	Anne Phillips	7	2	77	59
Alberta	Vera Reed	6	3	90	66
New Brunswick	Phyllis Pinder	4	5	73	83
Ontario	Fern Irwin	4	5	82	63
Manitoba	Kay Hebert	3	6	76	86
Newfoundland	Marjorie Rockwell	2	7	50	102
Prince Edward Island	Elizabeth MacDonald	1	8	49	93
Nova Scotia	Pearl Carter	1	8	56	98

== Round robin results ==
All draw times are listed in Mountain Time (UTC-07:00)

=== Draw 1 ===
Monday, February 26 2:30 PM

Team	1	2	3	4	5	6	7	8	9	10	Final
British Columbia (Hansen)	0	0	1	0	5	0	0	2	0	2	10
Alberta (Reed)	2	1	0	1	0	2	2	0	1	0	9

Team	1	2	3	4	5	6	7	8	9	10	Final
Newfoundland (Rockwell)	0	0	0	1	0	1	0	0	3	0	5
Manitoba (Hebert)	0	4	1	0	3	0	1	2	0	1	12

Team	1	2	3	4	5	6	7	8	9	10	Final
Quebec (Phillips)	1	1	0	0	3	2	1	0	1	1	10
Prince Edward Island (MacDonald)	0	0	2	1	0	0	0	1	0	0	4

Team	1	2	3	4	5	6	7	8	9	10	11	Final
Nova Scotia (Carter)	1	0	1	1	1	1	1	1	0	0	0	7
New Brunswick (Pinder)	0	2	0	0	0	0	0	0	1	4	2	9

Team	1	2	3	4	5	6	7	8	9	10	Final
Ontario (Irwin)	0	1	0	1	0	0	3	0	3	0	8
Saskatchewan (McKee)	3	0	2	0	2	1	0	1	0	3	12

=== Draw 2 ===
Monday, February 26 8:00 PM

Team	1	2	3	4	5	6	7	8	9	10	Final
Prince Edward Island (MacDonald)	0	1	0	0	2	0	0	1	1	0	5
Newfoundland (Rockwell)	1	0	2	2	0	3	1	0	0	1	10

Team	1	2	3	4	5	6	7	8	9	10	Final
Saskatchewan (McKee)	1	2	1	2	0	3	1	0	1	X	11
Alberta (Reed)	0	0	0	0	1	0	0	1	0	X	2

Team	1	2	3	4	5	6	7	8	9	10	Final
Manitoba (Hebert)	0	0	1	4	2	2	0	1	4	1	15
Nova Scotia (Carter)	1	1	0	0	0	0	2	0	0	0	4

Team	1	2	3	4	5	6	7	8	9	10	Final
British Columbia (Hansen)	3	0	0	0	1	0	0	2	0	4	10
New Brunswick (Pinder)	0	2	1	1	0	1	1	0	1	0	7

Team	1	2	3	4	5	6	7	8	9	10	11	Final
Ontario (Irwin)	0	0	3	0	0	1	0	2	0	1	0	7
Quebec (Phillips)	2	0	0	2	1	0	1	0	1	0	1	8

=== Draw 3 ===
Tuesday, February 27 9:00 AM

Team	1	2	3	4	5	6	7	8	9	10	Final
British Columbia (Hansen)	0	0	0	4	1	1	2	1	0	4	13
Manitoba (Hebert)	2	2	1	0	0	0	0	0	1	0	6

Team	1	2	3	4	5	6	7	8	9	10	Final
Saskatchewan (McKee)	0	0	2	0	0	4	3	0	0	2	11
Newfoundland (Rockwell)	0	1	0	1	1	0	0	1	2	0	6

Team	1	2	3	4	5	6	7	8	9	10	Final
Quebec (Phillips)	0	2	2	2	1	0	1	1	0	X	9
Alberta (Reed)	1	0	0	0	0	1	0	0	1	X	3

Team	1	2	3	4	5	6	7	8	9	10	Final
Nova Scotia (Carter)	0	0	0	1	0	0	2	0	0	X	3
Ontario (Irwin)	5	2	2	0	1	1	0	2	1	X	14

Team	1	2	3	4	5	6	7	8	9	10	Final
Prince Edward Island (MacDonald)	0	1	0	0	2	2	0	1	1	X	7
New Brunswick (Pinder)	1	0	6	1	0	0	6	0	0	X	14

=== Draw 4 ===
Tuesday, February 27 2:00 PM

Team	1	2	3	4	5	6	7	8	9	10	Final
Prince Edward Island (MacDonald)	0	0	1	0	0	0	0	0	1	X	2
Alberta (Reed)	1	1	0	4	1	1	2	2	0	X	12

Team	1	2	3	4	5	6	7	8	9	10	Final
Manitoba (Hebert)	1	0	1	2	0	4	0	0	1	0	9
Quebec (Phillips)	0	5	0	0	2	0	1	1	0	1	10

Team	1	2	3	4	5	6	7	8	9	10	Final
Nova Scotia (Carter)	0	1	0	2	2	1	2	1	3	0	12
Newfoundland (Rockwell)	3	0	3	0	0	0	0	0	0	1	7

Team	1	2	3	4	5	6	7	8	9	10	Final
Ontario (Irwin)	1	0	0	0	0	2	0	1	0	X	4
New Brunswick (Pinder)	0	1	2	1	2	0	1	0	2	X	9

Team	1	2	3	4	5	6	7	8	9	10	Final
Saskatchewan (McKee)	2	0	0	0	0	5	0	2	0	1	10
British Columbia (Hansen)	0	2	3	3	1	0	1	0	1	0	11

=== Draw 5 ===
Tuesday, February 27 8:00 PM

Team	1	2	3	4	5	6	7	8	9	10	Final
Newfoundland (Rockwell)	1	0	1	1	0	3	5	0	0	X	11
New Brunswick (Pinder)	0	1	0	0	2	0	0	1	1	X	5

Team	1	2	3	4	5	6	7	8	9	10	Final
Alberta (Reed)	1	0	4	0	0	0	4	0	3	X	12
Nova Scotia (Carter)	0	3	0	1	2	1	0	1	0	X	8

Team	1	2	3	4	5	6	7	8	9	10	Final
Ontario (Irwin)	1	1	0	1	0	1	0	0	3	0	7
British Columbia (Hansen)	0	0	1	0	1	0	2	3	0	1	8

Team	1	2	3	4	5	6	7	8	9	10	Final
Prince Edward Island (MacDonald)	0	1	0	0	2	0	0	2	0	2	7
Manitoba (Hebert)	1	0	3	1	0	1	1	0	1	0	8

Team	1	2	3	4	5	6	7	8	9	10	Final
Quebec (Phillips)	1	0	1	1	0	2	1	0	0	0	6
Saskatchewan (McKee)	0	2	0	0	1	0	0	1	2	1	7

=== Draw 6 ===
Wednesday, February 28 2:30 PM

Team	1	2	3	4	5	6	7	8	9	10	Final
British Columbia (Hansen)	2	2	0	5	1	3	2	3	X	X	18
Newfoundland (Rockwell)	0	0	1	0	0	0	0	0	X	X	1

Team	1	2	3	4	5	6	7	8	9	10	Final
Alberta (Reed)	4	3	1	0	0	2	0	1	0	2	13
Manitoba (Hebert)	0	0	0	1	3	0	2	0	2	0	8

Team	1	2	3	4	5	6	7	8	9	10	Final
Saskatchewan (McKee)	2	0	1	1	0	0	2	0	3	X	9
Nova Scotia (Carter)	0	1	0	0	0	1	0	1	0	X	3

Team	1	2	3	4	5	6	7	8	9	10	Final
Prince Edward Island (MacDonald)	0	0	0	0	0	0	0	0	5	0	5
Ontario (Irwin)	2	1	0	1	2	1	1	1	0	2	11

Team	1	2	3	4	5	6	7	8	9	10	Final
Quebec (Phillips)	0	3	0	3	1	1	0	2	0	2	12
New Brunswick (Pinder)	2	0	2	0	0	0	2	0	2	0	8

=== Draw 7 ===
Wednesday, February 28 8:00 PM

Team	1	2	3	4	5	6	7	8	9	10	Final
Alberta (Reed)	1	2	2	0	0	3	1	2	4	X	15
Newfoundland (Rockwell)	0	0	0	2	1	0	0	0	0	X	3

Team	1	2	3	4	5	6	7	8	9	10	Final
British Columbia (Hansen)	1	1	2	0	0	2	1	0	1	X	8
Prince Edward Island (MacDonald)	0	0	0	2	1	0	0	1	0	X	4

Team	1	2	3	4	5	6	7	8	9	10	Final
New Brunswick (Pinder)	0	2	0	0	1	0	0	1	0	X	4
Saskatchewan (McKee)	3	0	1	1	0	3	4	0	0	X	12

Team	1	2	3	4	5	6	7	8	9	10	Final
Manitoba (Hebert)	0	1	0	0	3	0	0	0	0	1	5
Ontario (Irwin)	1	0	2	2	0	2	1	1	1	0	10

Team	1	2	3	4	5	6	7	8	9	10	Final
Nova Scotia (Carter)	1	0	0	0	1	1	2	0	2	0	7
Quebec (Phillips)	0	2	1	1	0	0	0	2	0	2	8

=== Draw 8 ===
Thursday, March 1 2:00 PM

Team	1	2	3	4	5	6	7	8	9	10	Final
Manitoba (Hebert)	0	2	0	1	0	2	0	0	0	X	5
Saskatchewan (McKee)	3	0	3	0	3	0	3	3	0	X	15

Team	1	2	3	4	5	6	7	8	9	10	Final
Quebec (Phillips)	1	0	0	0	1	1	0	0	1	X	4
British Columbia (Hansen)	0	2	0	3	0	0	2	1	0	X	8

Team	1	2	3	4	5	6	7	8	9	10	Final
Newfoundland (Rockwell)	0	0	0	0	0	0	0	0	1	X	1
Ontario (Irwin)	2	1	1	3	1	2	3	1	0	X	14

Team	1	2	3	4	5	6	7	8	9	10	Final
Nova Scotia (Carter)	1	0	2	0	2	0	0	1	0	X	6
Prince Edward Island (MacDonald)	0	4	0	3	0	2	2	0	1	X	12

Team	1	2	3	4	5	6	7	8	9	10	Final
New Brunswick (Pinder)	1	0	2	0	3	0	0	0	2	X	8
Alberta (Reed)	0	2	0	2	0	4	3	1	0	X	12

=== Draw 9 ===
Thursday, March 1 8:00 PM

Team	1	2	3	4	5	6	7	8	9	10	Final
Saskatchewan (McKee)	1	2	3	0	4	0	1	0	3	X	14
Prince Edward Island (MacDonald)	0	0	0	1	0	1	0	1	0	X	3

Team	1	2	3	4	5	6	7	8	9	10	Final
British Columbia (Hansen)	0	3	1	0	1	4	0	3	0	X	12
Nova Scotia (Carter)	1	0	0	3	0	0	1	0	1	X	6

Team	1	2	3	4	5	6	7	8	9	10	Final
Quebec (Phillips)	1	3	0	0	4	0	1	1	0	0	10
Newfoundland (Rockwell)	0	0	1	1	0	3	0	0	0	1	6

Team	1	2	3	4	5	6	7	8	9	10	Final
Ontario (Irwin)	1	0	0	0	3	0	2	0	1	X	7
Alberta (Reed)	0	4	3	3	0	1	0	1	0	X	12

Team	1	2	3	4	5	6	7	8	9	10	Final
New Brunswick (Pinder)	0	3	0	1	2	0	1	1	0	1	9
Manitoba (Hebert)	1	0	1	0	0	4	0	0	2	0	8
