= Sylvia Fedoruk =

Canadian curler and politician

The Honourable Sylvia Fedoruk OC SOM
- Former Lieutenant Governor of Saskatchewan, the Honourable Sylvia Fedoruk wearing the insignia of the Order of Canada

17th Lieutenant Governor of Saskatchewan
- In office September 7, 1988 – May 31, 1994
- Monarch: Elizabeth II
- Governors General: Jeanne Sauvé; Ray Hnatyshyn
- Premier: Grant Devine; Roy Romanow
- Preceded by: Frederick Johnson
- Succeeded by: Jack Wiebe

Personal details
- Born: May 5, 1927 Canora, Saskatchewan, Canada
- Died: September 26, 2012 (aged 85) Saskatoon, Saskatchewan, Canada
- Education: University of Saskatchewan
- Occupation: Medical physicist, Physicist, Curler

Sylvia Olga Fedoruk ([Fe-doruk]; Ukrainian: Федорук) OC SOM (May 5, 1927 – September 26, 2012) was a Canadian physicist, medical physicist, curler and the 17th lieutenant governor of Saskatchewan, from 1988 to 1994.

== Life ==
Born in Canora, Saskatchewan to Ukrainian immigrants Annie Romaniuk and Theodore Fedoruk, Fedoruk attended a one room schoolhouse in Wroxton, north east of Yorkton. Her father was her teacher.

During World War II, her family relocated to Ontario where her parents took war factory work. In 1946, Fedoruk completed her studies at Walkerville Collegiate in Windsor Ontario, at the top of her class and was awarded the Ernest J. Creed Memorial Medal and an entrance scholarship to attend University. However, the family chose to return to Saskatchewan where Sylvia entered the University of Saskatchewan at Saskatoon in the fall of 1946.

She received a Bachelor of Arts degree in physics, at the University of Saskatchewan, in 1949 and was awarded the Governor General's Gold Medal. Fedoruk then went on to complete her M.A. in physics in 1951.

Fedoruk was recruited by Dr. Harold E. Johns to be the radiation physicist at Saskatoon Cancer Clinic. She became the chief medical physicist at the Saskatoon Cancer Clinic and director of physics services at the Saskatchewan Cancer Clinic. She was a professor of oncology and associate member in physics at the University of Saskatchewan. She was involved in the development of the world's first cobalt-60 unit and one of the first nuclear medicine scanning machines. The cobalt-60 beam therapy unit, or the "cobalt bomb" as it was known, was the first of its kind to successfully use targeted radiation to treat cancer in a patient. The machine's collimated beam of radiation could be adjusted to the size of the tumor to irradiate the growth. Fedoruk's masters work on depth-dose measurements for radiation treatment were essential in the success of the beam therapy unit.

In 1961, she played the third for Joyce McKee for the Saskatchewan curling team, the winners in the very first Diamond 'D' Championships.The next year team Saskatchewan was a runner-up in the 1962 Diamond D Championship with Fedoruk again playing as third. From 1971 to 1972 she was president of the Canadian Ladies Curling Association. In 1986, she was inducted into the Canadian Curling Hall of Fame, as a builder, and was awarded the Saskatchewan Order of Merit.

From 1986 to 1989 she was chancellor of the University of Saskatchewan. She was the first woman to fill this position at the University of Saskatchewan and was the first woman member of the Atomic Energy Control Board of Canada. Then in 1987, she was made an Officer of the Order of Canada.

From 1988 to 1994, she was Lieutenant Governor of Saskatchewan.

In the 1990s, the City of Saskatoon named a new road, Fedoruk Drive in her honour. The roadway runs from Central Avenue to McOrmond Drive, north of the communities of Silverspring and Evergreen and south of the community of Aspen Ridge and the Northeast Swale. Fedoruk Drive serves as a minor arterial roadway in the northeast sector of the city.

On October 3, 2012, the name of the Canadian Centre for Nuclear Innovation (CCNI) was changed to the Sylvia Fedoruk Canadian Centre for Nuclear Innovation in honor of the pioneering work she did in the treatment of cancer using cobalt-60 radiation therapy in the 1950s.

In 2009, she was inducted into the Canadian Medical Hall of Fame.

== Arms ==
Coat of arms of Sylvia Fedoruk
Notes The arms of Sylvia Fedoruk consist of: Crest Above a helmet mantled Bleu Celeste doubled Or on a wreath Or and Bleu Celeste a Saskatchewan coronet (on a rim Vert fimbriated Or wheat ears Or set alternately with prairie lily flowers proper) issuant therefrom a bull's head in trian aspect Bleu Celeste accorné annelled and crined Or. Escutcheon Or on a pale between in chief two nuclei enclosed within a representation of three electron paths all Bleu Celeste a lion rampant Or armed and langued Gules. Supporters Two white-tailed does Bleu Celeste each unguled Or langued Gules and gorged with a coronet of wheat ears Or. Compartment A grassy mound strewn with prairie lily flowers proper. Motto Deo Et Patriae

== See also ==
- Monarchy in Saskatchewan

Academic offices
Preceded by Emmett Matthew Hall	Chancellor of the University of Saskatchewan; 1986–1989	Succeeded by E. K. Turner
