= 2014 Canadian Senior Curling Championships – Women's tournament =

2014 Canadian Senior Curling Championships Women's tournament
- Host city: Yellowknife, Northwest Territories
- Arena: Yellowknife Community Arena; Yellowknife Curling Centre
- Dates: March 22–29
- Winner: Manitoba
- Curling club: Brandon CC, Brandon
- Skip: Lois Fowler
- Third: Maureen Bonar
- Second: Cathy Gauthier
- Lead: Allyson Stewart
- Finalist: Saskatchewan (Lorraine Arguin)

The women's tournament of the 2014 Canadian Senior Curling Championships was held from March 22 to 29 at the Yellowknife Community Arena and the Yellowknife Curling Centre in Yellowknife, Northwest Territories.

== Qualifying round ==
Four associations did not automatically qualify to the championships, and participated in a qualifying round. Since Yukon withdrew from competition, Nunavut, Ontario and Prince Edward Island played in a double knockout to determine the two qualifiers.

=== Teams ===
The teams are listed as follows:

Province	Skip	Third	Second	Lead	Locale
Nunavut	Beverly Ford	Lucy Makkigak	Mary Anawak	Minnie Tatty	Qavik Curling Club, Rankin Inlet
Ontario	Marilyn Bodogh	Kathy Chittley-Young	Colleen Madonia	Jane Hooper-Perroud	St. Catharines Curling Club, St. Catharines
Prince Edward Island	Jennifer Scott	June Moyaert	Terri Thompson	Fran Whitlock	Montague Curling Club, Montague

=== Knockout brackets ===
Semifinals			Qualifier 1
			1	Ontario	4
2	Prince Edward Island	11	2	Prince Edward Island	9
3	Nunavut	2

Qualifier 2
1	Ontario	16
3	Nunavut	0

== Teams ==
The teams are listed as follows:

Province	Skip	Third	Second	Lead	Locale
Alberta	Glenys Bakker	Karen Morrison	Barbara McDonald	Karen Ruus	Calgary Winter Club, Calgary
British Columbia	Penny Shantz	Sandra Jenkins	Debbie Pulak	Kate Horne	Parksville Curling Club, Parksville
Manitoba	Lois Fowler	Maureen Bonar	Cathy Gauthier	Allyson Stewart	Brandon Curling Club, Brandon
New Brunswick	Heidi Hanlon	Kathy Floyd	Judy Blanchard	Jane Arseneau	Thistle St. Andrews Curling Club, Saint John
Newfoundland and Labrador	Cathy Cunningham	Diane Roberts	Heather Martin	Patricia Tiller	Re/MAX Centre, St. John's
Northern Ontario	Vicky Barrett	Marg McLaughlin	Valerie MacInnes	Brenda Harrow	Sudbury Curling Club, Sudbury
Northwest Territories	Ann McKellar-Gillis	Wendy Ondrack	Louise Marcinkoski	Natalie Kelln	Yellowknife Curling Club, Yellowknife
Nova Scotia	Colleen Pinkney	Wendy Currie	Shelley MacNutt	Susan Creelman	Truro Curling Club, Truro
Ontario	Marilyn Bodogh	Kathy Chittley-Young	Colleen Madonia	Jane Hooper-Perroud	St. Catharines Curling Club, St. Catharines
Prince Edward Island	Jennifer Scott	June Moyaert	Terri Thompson	Fran Whitlock	Montague Curling Club, Montague
Quebec	Catherine Derick	Sylvie Daniel	Chantal Gadoua	Cheryl Morgan	Club de curling Thurso, Thurso
Saskatchewan	Lorraine Arguin	DondaLee Deis	Shelly Urquhart	Connie Fritzler	Moose Jaw Ford Curling Centre, Moose Jaw

== Round-robin standings ==
Final round-robin standings

Key
Teams to Playoffs
Relegated to 2015 qualifying round

Province	Skip	W	L
Manitoba	Lois Fowler	10	1
Saskatchewan	Lorraine Arguin	10	1
Ontario	Marilyn Bodogh	8	3
Nova Scotia	Colleen Pinkney	7	4
Alberta	Glenys Bakker	6	5
New Brunswick	Heidi Hanlon	6	5
British Columbia	Penny Shantz	5	6
Northern Ontario	Vicky Barrett	4	7
Prince Edward Island	Jennifer Scott	3	8
Newfoundland and Labrador	Cathy Cunningham	3	8
Quebec	Catherine Derick	3	8
Northwest Territories	Ann McKellar-Gillis	1	9

== Round-robin results ==
All times listed are in Mountain Standard Time (UTC−7).

=== Draw 1 ===
Saturday, March 22, 2:00 pm

Sheet B	1	2	3	4	5	6	7	8	9	10	Final
Nova Scotia (Pinkney) 🔨	0	0	0	3	0	1	0	0	2	0	6
Ontario (Bodogh)	1	0	2	0	1	0	0	2	0	2	8

Sheet C	1	2	3	4	5	6	7	8	9	10	Final
Saskatchewan (Arguin)	0	0	0	0	1	0	3	0	2	1	7
British Columbia (Shantz) 🔨	0	0	2	1	0	2	0	1	0	0	6

Sheet D	1	2	3	4	5	6	7	8	9	10	Final
Newfoundland and Labrador (Cunningham) 🔨	2	2	0	1	1	0	0	2	1	X	9
Alberta (Bakker)	0	0	1	0	0	1	1	0	0	X	3

Sheet E	1	2	3	4	5	6	7	8	9	10	Final
Northwest Territories (McKellar-Gillis)	2	0	1	1	0	1	0	0	0	2	7
Northern Ontario (Barrett) 🔨	0	1	0	0	3	0	0	0	1	0	5

Sheet G	1	2	3	4	5	6	7	8	9	10	11	Final
New Brunswick (Hanlon)	1	1	0	1	0	1	2	0	1	0	0	7
Manitoba (Fowler) 🔨	0	0	1	0	3	0	0	1	0	2	1	8

Sheet H	1	2	3	4	5	6	7	8	9	10	Final
Quebec (Derick)	0	0	1	1	0	0	1	0	3	0	6
Prince Edward Island (Scott) 🔨	3	1	0	0	1	0	0	1	0	3	9

=== Draw 3 ===
Sunday, March 23, 9:00 am

Sheet A	1	2	3	4	5	6	7	8	9	10	Final
Northwest Territories (McKellar-Gillis)	0	0	1	0	1	0	0	1	X	X	3
Ontario (Bodogh) 🔨	0	2	0	3	0	4	1	0	X	X	10

Sheet B	1	2	3	4	5	6	7	8	9	10	Final
New Brunswick (Hanlon) 🔨	2	0	2	0	0	2	0	1	1	0	8
Quebec (Derick)	0	1	0	2	0	0	2	0	0	1	6

Sheet D	1	2	3	4	5	6	7	8	9	10	Final
Saskatchewan (Arguin) 🔨	0	3	3	1	0	1	0	1	0	0	9
Nova Scotia (Pinkney)	3	0	0	0	1	0	1	0	1	2	8

Sheet F	1	2	3	4	5	6	7	8	9	10	Final
Newfoundland and Labrador (Cunningham)	0	0	1	2	1	0	0	0	0	0	4
Prince Edward Island (Scott) 🔨	1	1	0	0	0	0	1	1	1	1	6

=== Draw 4 ===
Sunday, March 23, 2:00 pm

Sheet A	1	2	3	4	5	6	7	8	9	10	11	Final
Alberta (Bakker) 🔨	0	2	0	0	1	0	1	2	0	0	1	7
Quebec (Derick)	2	0	0	1	0	2	0	0	0	1	0	6

Sheet B	1	2	3	4	5	6	7	8	9	10	Final
Northern Ontario (Barrett) 🔨	0	0	1	0	1	0	1	0	1	X	4
Manitoba (Fowler)	1	0	0	2	0	2	0	2	0	X	7

Sheet D	1	2	3	4	5	6	7	8	9	10	Final
Ontario (Bodogh) 🔨	0	2	0	1	0	1	3	2	0	X	9
Newfoundland and Labrador (Cunningham)	2	0	2	0	1	0	0	0	2	X	7

Sheet F	1	2	3	4	5	6	7	8	9	10	Final
British Columbia (Shantz) 🔨	1	0	0	0	3	0	1	0	0	2	7
New Brunswick (Hanlon)	0	0	1	2	0	2	0	1	0	0	6

=== Draw 5 ===
Sunday, March 23, 7:00 pm

Sheet A	1	2	3	4	5	6	7	8	9	10	Final
Manitoba (Fowler) 🔨	2	0	1	2	0	2	0	1	0	0	8
Saskatchewan (Arguin)	0	2	0	0	1	0	1	0	1	1	6

Sheet B	1	2	3	4	5	6	7	8	9	10	Final
Prince Edward Island (Scott) 🔨	0	0	1	0	3	0	0	1	0	1	6
Northwest Territories (McKellar-Gillis)	1	1	0	2	0	0	1	0	0	0	5

Sheet D	1	2	3	4	5	6	7	8	9	10	Final
Alberta (Bakker) 🔨	0	2	0	0	0	0	2	0	1	0	5
British Columbia (Shantz)	0	0	0	1	0	0	0	2	0	1	4

Sheet F	1	2	3	4	5	6	7	8	9	10	Final
Northern Ontario (Barrett)	0	0	1	0	1	0	2	0	0	1	5
Nova Scotia (Pinkney) 🔨	1	1	0	1	0	1	0	3	1	0	8

=== Draw 6 ===
Monday, March 24, 9:00 am

Sheet C	1	2	3	4	5	6	7	8	9	10	Final
New Brunswick (Hanlon) 🔨	2	0	0	0	2	0	0	1	0	1	6
Alberta (Bakker)	0	0	0	1	0	1	2	0	0	0	4

Sheet E	1	2	3	4	5	6	7	8	9	10	Final
British Columbia (Shantz)	2	0	0	0	1	0	0	0	0	X	3
Quebec (Derick) 🔨	0	2	0	1	0	1	1	2	2	X	9

Sheet G	1	2	3	4	5	6	7	8	9	10	Final
Manitoba (Fowler) 🔨	1	0	0	3	2	0	4	X	X	X	10
Ontario (Bodogh)	0	1	0	0	0	2	0	X	X	X	3

Sheet H	1	2	3	4	5	6	7	8	9	10	Final
Newfoundland and Labrador (Cunningham)	0	0	0	1	0	1	0	0	X	X	2
Northern Ontario (Barrett) 🔨	0	1	1	0	1	0	1	3	X	X	7

=== Draw 7 ===
Monday, March 24, 2:00 pm

Sheet C	1	2	3	4	5	6	7	8	9	10	Final
Northern Ontario (Barrett)	1	0	1	0	2	0	0	0	1	0	5
Saskatchewan (Arguin) 🔨	0	2	0	1	0	1	0	1	0	3	8

Sheet E	1	2	3	4	5	6	7	8	9	10	Final
Manitoba (Fowler)	1	0	1	0	3	0	1	1	0	X	7
Nova Scotia (Pinkney) 🔨	0	3	0	3	0	2	0	0	1	X	9

Sheet G	1	2	3	4	5	6	7	8	9	10	Final
Northwest Territories (McKellar-Gillis)	0	0	1	0	1	0	1	0	2	0	5
Alberta (Bakker) 🔨	0	0	0	2	0	2	0	1	0	3	8

Sheet H	1	2	3	4	5	6	7	8	9	10	Final
Prince Edward Island (Scott) 🔨	1	0	0	1	0	1	0	1	X	X	4
British Columbia (Shantz)	0	1	4	0	2	0	2	0	X	X	9

=== Draw 8 ===
Monday, March 24, 7:00 pm

Sheet C	1	2	3	4	5	6	7	8	9	10	Final
Ontario (Bodogh) 🔨	1	3	5	0	0	1	0	0	X	X	10
Prince Edward Island (Scott)	0	0	0	3	1	0	2	1	X	X	7

Sheet E	1	2	3	4	5	6	7	8	9	10	Final
Newfoundland and Labrador (Cunningham)	0	4	2	3	2	0	3	0	X	X	14
Northwest Territories (McKellar-Gillis) 🔨	1	0	0	0	0	1	0	1	X	X	3

Sheet G	1	2	3	4	5	6	7	8	9	10	Final
Saskatchewan (Arguin) 🔨	2	0	0	0	2	2	4	0	X	X	10
Quebec (Derick)	0	0	0	1	0	0	0	3	X	X	4

Sheet H	1	2	3	4	5	6	7	8	9	10	Final
Nova Scotia (Pinkney) 🔨	0	0	2	0	1	0	0	1	0	0	4
New Brunswick (Hanlon)	0	1	0	1	0	1	0	0	1	1	5

=== Draw 9 ===
Tuesday, March 25, 9:00 am

Sheet A	1	2	3	4	5	6	7	8	9	10	Final
British Columbia (Shantz) 🔨	2	1	1	0	0	1	0	1	0	0	6
Northern Ontario (Barrett)	0	0	0	1	1	0	1	0	1	1	5

Sheet B	1	2	3	4	5	6	7	8	9	10	Final
Alberta (Bakker)	0	0	0	0	1	0	1	0	3	1	6
Nova Scotia (Pinkney) 🔨	1	0	0	0	0	2	0	2	0	0	5

Sheet D	1	2	3	4	5	6	7	8	9	10	Final
Prince Edward Island (Scott)	0	1	0	0	1	0	0	X	X	X	2
Manitoba (Fowler) 🔨	1	0	3	2	0	3	2	X	X	X	11

Sheet F	1	2	3	4	5	6	7	8	9	10	Final
Saskatchewan (Arguin)	0	1	0	2	0	4	1	0	4	X	12
Northwest Territories (McKellar-Gillis) 🔨	1	0	1	0	1	0	0	2	0	X	5

=== Draw 10 ===
Tuesday, March 25, 2:00 pm

Sheet A	1	2	3	4	5	6	7	8	9	10	Final
Nova Scotia (Pinkney) 🔨	2	0	2	0	2	0	0	1	0	2	9
Prince Edward Island (Scott)	0	1	0	2	0	1	2	0	0	0	6

Sheet B	1	2	3	4	5	6	7	8	9	10	Final
Newfoundland and Labrador (Cunningham)	0	0	0	1	1	0	0	4	0	0	6
Saskatchewan (Arguin) 🔨	0	1	0	0	0	2	1	0	2	1	7

Sheet D	1	2	3	4	5	6	7	8	9	10	Final
Northwest Territories (McKellar-Gillis)	0	2	0	2	0	1	0	0	0	X	5
New Brunswick (Hanlon) 🔨	1	0	5	0	1	0	1	1	1	X	10

Sheet F	1	2	3	4	5	6	7	8	9	10	Final
Quebec (Derick) 🔨	0	0	2	0	1	0	1	0	X	X	4
Ontario (Bodogh)	1	1	0	3	0	2	0	5	X	X	12

=== Draw 11 ===
Tuesday, March 25, 7:00 pm

Sheet A	1	2	3	4	5	6	7	8	9	10	11	Final
New Brunswick (Hanlon)	0	2	1	0	1	0	1	0	1	0	1	7
Newfoundland and Labrador (Cunningham) 🔨	1	0	0	1	0	1	0	2	0	1	0	6

Sheet B	1	2	3	4	5	6	7	8	9	10	Final
Ontario (Bodogh)	0	2	0	1	0	2	0	2	0	1	8
British Columbia (Shantz) 🔨	2	0	2	0	1	0	1	0	0	0	6

Sheet D	1	2	3	4	5	6	7	8	9	10	Final
Quebec (Derick) 🔨	1	0	1	1	1	0	2	0	2	X	8
Northern Ontario (Barrett)	0	1	0	0	0	2	0	1	0	X	4

Sheet F	1	2	3	4	5	6	7	8	9	10	Final
Alberta (Bakker) 🔨	1	0	0	1	0	1	0	2	0	0	5
Manitoba (Fowler)	0	1	0	0	2	0	3	0	2	1	9

=== Draw 12 ===
Wednesday, March 26, 9:00 am

Sheet C	1	2	3	4	5	6	7	8	9	10	11	Final
Nova Scotia (Pinkney) 🔨	2	0	2	0	1	0	0	1	1	0	1	8
Newfoundland and Labrador (Cunningham)	0	2	0	1	0	2	1	0	0	1	0	7

Sheet E	1	2	3	4	5	6	7	8	9	10	Final
Saskatchewan (Arguin)	0	0	3	1	0	1	0	0	4	X	9
Ontario (Bodogh) 🔨	3	1	0	0	0	0	1	1	0	X	6

Sheet G	1	2	3	4	5	6	7	8	9	10	Final
Prince Edward Island (Scott)	0	0	0	2	1	2	0	0	0	0	5
New Brunswick (Hanlon) 🔨	0	1	0	0	0	0	1	1	1	2	6

Sheet H	1	2	3	4	5	6	7	8	9	10	Final
Northwest Territories (McKellar-Gillis) 🔨	0	2	0	1	0	0	2	0	X	X	5
Quebec (Derick)	2	0	2	0	3	1	0	2	X	X	10

=== Draw 13 ===
Wednesday, March 26, 2:00 pm

Sheet C	1	2	3	4	5	6	7	8	9	10	11	Final
Manitoba (Fowler) 🔨	1	0	2	0	2	0	1	0	3	0	1	10
Quebec (Derick)	0	2	0	3	0	1	0	1	0	2	0	9

Sheet E	1	2	3	4	5	6	7	8	9	10	Final
Northern Ontario (Barrett) 🔨	1	0	4	0	1	1	0	1	0	1	9
New Brunswick (Hanlon)	0	2	0	1	0	0	1	0	2	0	6

Sheet G	1	2	3	4	5	6	7	8	9	10	Final
Newfoundland and Labrador (Cunningham)	0	0	1	0	0	1	0	2	0	X	4
British Columbia (Shantz) 🔨	0	0	0	0	2	0	3	0	1	X	6

Sheet H	1	2	3	4	5	6	7	8	9	10	Final
Ontario (Bodogh) 🔨	0	1	0	1	0	1	0	0	1	X	4
Alberta (Bakker)	1	0	0	0	3	0	0	3	0	X	7

=== Draw 14 ===
Wednesday, March 26, 7:00 pm

Sheet C	1	2	3	4	5	6	7	8	9	10	Final
Prince Edward Island (Scott)	0	0	1	3	0	0	0	1	0	X	5
Northern Ontario (Barrett) 🔨	1	0	0	0	3	3	0	0	1	X	8

Sheet E	1	2	3	4	5	6	7	8	9	10	Final
Northwest Territories (McKellar-Gillis) 🔨	0	1	0	0	0	0	1	1	X	X	3
Manitoba (Fowler)	2	0	4	2	0	2	0	0	X	X	10

Sheet G	1	2	3	4	5	6	7	8	9	10	Final
Alberta (Bakker)	0	0	0	0	0	0	0	X	X	X	0
Saskatchewan (Arguin) 🔨	0	0	2	1	2	3	1	X	X	X	9

Sheet H	1	2	3	4	5	6	7	8	9	10	Final
British Columbia (Shantz)	0	0	1	2	0	1	0	1	X	X	5
Nova Scotia (Pinkney) 🔨	2	3	0	0	1	0	4	0	X	X	10

=== Draw 15 ===
Thursday, March 27, 9:00 am

Sheet A	1	2	3	4	5	6	7	8	9	10	Final
Northern Ontario (Barrett)	0	2	0	1	0	0	2	4	X	X	9
Alberta (Bakker) 🔨	1	0	0	0	0	1	0	0	X	X	2

Sheet B	1	2	3	4	5	6	7	8	9	10	Final
Quebec (Derick)	0	0	2	0	1	1	0	2	0	1	7
Newfoundland and Labrador (Cunningham) 🔨	4	1	0	1	0	0	1	0	2	0	9

Sheet D	1	2	3	4	5	6	7	8	9	10	Final
New Brunswick (Hanlon)	0	1	0	2	0	1	0	1	0	0	5
Ontario (Bodogh) 🔨	0	0	3	0	1	0	1	0	1	2	8

Sheet F	1	2	3	4	5	6	7	8	9	10	Final
Manitoba (Fowler) 🔨	0	1	1	0	0	0	2	0	2	1	7
British Columbia (Shantz)	1	0	0	1	2	1	0	1	0	0	6

=== Draw 16 ===
Thursday, March 27, 2:00 pm

Sheet C	1	2	3	4	5	6	7	8	9	10	Final
British Columbia (Shantz) 🔨	0	2	2	1	1	0	1	4	X	X	11
Northwest Territories (McKellar-Gillis)	0	0	0	0	0	1	0	0	X	X	1

Sheet E	1	2	3	4	5	6	7	8	9	10	Final
Prince Edward Island (Scott)	0	0	0	1	0	1	1	0	X	X	3
Alberta (Bakker) 🔨	2	0	1	0	2	0	0	3	X	X	8

Sheet G	1	2	3	4	5	6	7	8	9	10	Final
Quebec (Derick)	0	0	1	0	1	1	0	2	1	X	6
Nova Scotia (Pinkney) 🔨	0	4	0	3	0	0	2	0	0	X	9

Sheet H	1	2	3	4	5	6	7	8	9	10	Final
New Brunswick (Hanlon)	1	0	0	0	1	1	1	0	1	0	5
Saskatchewan (Arguin) 🔨	0	0	1	1	0	0	0	2	0	3	7

=== Draw 17 ===
Thursday, March 27, 7:00 pm

Sheet B	1	2	3	4	5	6	7	8	9	10	Final
Saskatchewan (Arguin) 🔨	0	1	0	0	2	0	0	1	1	2	7
Prince Edward Island (Scott)	0	0	1	2	0	1	2	0	0	0	6

Sheet D	1	2	3	4	5	6	7	8	9	10	Final
Nova Scotia (Pinkney) 🔨	6	0	5	0	1	0	3	3	X	X	18
Northwest Territories (McKellar-Gillis)	0	2	0	2	0	2	0	0	X	X	6

Sheet G	1	2	3	4	5	6	7	8	9	10	Final
Ontario (Bodogh) 🔨	0	0	4	0	0	2	0	1	0	1	8
Northern Ontario (Barrett)	3	1	0	1	0	0	1	0	0	0	6

Sheet H	1	2	3	4	5	6	7	8	9	10	Final
Manitoba (Fowler) 🔨	2	1	0	1	0	0	4	X	X	X	8
Newfoundland and Labrador (Cunningham)	0	0	1	0	1	1	0	X	X	X	3

== Playoffs ==
Semifinal			Final
			1	Manitoba	5
2	Saskatchewan	7	2	Saskatchewan	1
3	Ontario	4

=== Semifinal ===
Friday, March 28, 6:30 pm

Sheet B	1	2	3	4	5	6	7	8	9	10	Final
Saskatchewan (Arguin) 🔨	0	1	3	0	1	0	1	0	1	X	7
Ontario (Bodogh)	0	0	0	2	0	1	0	1	0	X	4

=== Final ===
Saturday, March 29, 2:30 pm

Sheet D	1	2	3	4	5	6	7	8	9	10	Final
Manitoba (Fowler) 🔨	0	0	0	1	0	0	0	3	1	X	5
Saskatchewan (Arguin)	0	0	0	0	0	0	1	0	0	X	1
