= 2014 Canadian Senior Curling Championships =

- Host city: Yellowknife, Northwest Territories
- Arena: Yellowknife Community Arena; Yellowknife Curling Centre
- Dates: March 22–29
- Men's winner: Nova Scotia
- Curling club: Mayflower CC, Halifax
- Skip: Alan O'Leary
- Third: Andrew Dauphinee
- Second: Danny Christianson
- Lead: Harold McCarthy
- Finalist: Manitoba (Kelly Robertson)
- Women's winner: Manitoba
- Curling club: Brandon CC, Brandon
- Skip: Lois Fowler
- Third: Maureen Bonar
- Second: Cathy Gauthier
- Lead: Allyson Stewart
- Finalist: Saskatchewan (Lorraine Arguin)

The 2014 Canadian Senior Curling Championships were held from March 22 to 29 at the Yellowknife Community Arena and the Yellowknife Curling Centre in Yellowknife, Northwest Territories. The winners represented Canada at the 2015 World Senior Curling Championships.

== Men ==
=== Round-robin standings ===
Final round-robin standings

Key
Teams to Playoffs
Teams to Tiebreaker
Relegated to 2015 qualifying round

Province	Skip	W	L
Nova Scotia	Alan O'Leary	9	2
Manitoba	Kelly Robertson	9	2
Northern Ontario	Robbie Gordon	8	3
Alberta	Mark Johnson	8	3
Saskatchewan	Darrell McKee	5	6
Ontario	Peter Mellor	5	6
Yukon	George Hilderman	5	6
British Columbia	Wes Craig	5	6
Quebec	Denis Laflamme	4	7
New Brunswick	Mark Armstrong	3	8
Northwest Territories	Glen Hudy	3	8
Prince Edward Island	Ted MacFadyen	2	9

=== Playoffs ===
Semifinal			Final
			1	Nova Scotia	9
2	Manitoba	10	2	Manitoba	8
3	Northern Ontario	8

==== Semifinal ====
Friday, March 28, 6:30 pm

Sheet D	1	2	3	4	5	6	7	8	9	10	Final
Manitoba (Robertson)	0	2	0	3	0	2	0	2	0	1	10
Northern Ontario (Gordon)	0	0	3	0	2	0	1	0	2	0	8

==== Final ====
Saturday, March 29, 2:30 pm

Sheet B	1	2	3	4	5	6	7	8	9	10	Final
Nova Scotia (O'Leary)	2	0	1	1	0	2	0	1	0	2	9
Manitoba (Robertson)	0	2	0	0	2	0	3	0	1	0	8

== Women ==
=== Round-robin standings ===
Final round-robin standings

Key
Teams to Playoffs
Relegated to 2015 qualifying round

Province	Skip	W	L
Manitoba	Lois Fowler	10	1
Saskatchewan	Lorraine Arguin	10	1
Ontario	Marilyn Bodogh	8	3
Nova Scotia	Colleen Pinkney	7	4
Alberta	Glenys Bakker	6	5
New Brunswick	Heidi Hanlon	6	5
British Columbia	Penny Shantz	5	6
Northern Ontario	Vicky Barrett	4	7
Prince Edward Island	Jennifer Scott	3	8
Newfoundland and Labrador	Cathy Cunningham	3	8
Quebec	Catherine Derick	3	8
Northwest Territories	Ann McKellar-Gillis	1	9

=== Playoffs ===
Semifinal			Final
			1	Manitoba	5
2	Saskatchewan	7	2	Saskatchewan	1
3	Ontario	4

==== Semifinal ====
Friday, March 28, 6:30 pm

Sheet B	1	2	3	4	5	6	7	8	9	10	Final
Saskatchewan (Arguin)	0	1	3	0	1	0	1	0	1	X	7
Ontario (Bodogh)	0	0	0	2	0	1	0	1	0	X	4

==== Final ====
Saturday, March 29, 2:30 pm

Sheet D	1	2	3	4	5	6	7	8	9	10	Final
Manitoba (Fowler)	0	0	0	1	0	0	0	3	1	X	5
Saskatchewan (Arguin)	0	0	0	0	0	0	1	0	0	X	1
