= 2013 Canadian Senior Curling Championships – Women's tournament =

2013 Canadian Senior Curling Championships Women's tournament
- Host city: Summerside, Prince Edward Island
- Arena: Silver Fox Curling & Yacht Club
- Dates: March 16–24
- Winner: Nova Scotia
- Curling club: Truro Curling Club, Truro
- Skip: Colleen Pinkney
- Third: Wendy Currie
- Second: Shelley MacNutt
- Lead: Susan Creelman
- Finalist: Alberta (Deb Santos)

The women's tournament of the 2013 Canadian Senior Curling Championships was held from March 16 to 24 at the Silver Fox Curling & Yacht Club in Summerside, Prince Edward Island.

== Qualifying round ==
Four associations did not automatically qualify to the championships, and participated in a qualifying round. Since Nunavut withdrew from competition, British Columbia, the Northwest Territories, and Yukon played in a double knockout to determine the two qualifiers.

=== Teams ===
The teams are listed as follows:

Province	Skip	Third	Second	Lead	Locale
British Columbia	Karen Lepine	Lorraine Jeffries	Carol Martel	Betsy Terpsma	Langley Curling Club, Langley
Northwest Territories	Ann McKellar-Gillis	Marie Coe	Louise Marcinkoski	Margaret Begg	Yellowknife Curling Club, Yellowknife
Yukon	Leslie Grant	Corinne Delaire	Therese Ducharme	Lorraine Stick	Whitehorse Curling Club, Whitehorse

=== Knockout brackets ===
Semifinals			Qualifier 1
			1	British Columbia	15
2	Northwest Territories	10	2	Northwest Territories	2
3	Yukon	2

Qualifier 2
2	Northwest Territories	9
3	Yukon	7

=== Knockout results ===
==== First knockout ====
Thursday, March 14, 2:30 pm

Sheet 4	1	2	3	4	5	6	7	8	9	10	Final
Northwest Territories (McKellar-Gillis) 🔨	2	0	3	0	2	1	2	X	X	X	10
Yukon (Grant)	0	1	0	1	0	0	0	X	X	X	2

Thursday, March 14, 7:00 pm

Sheet 5	1	2	3	4	5	6	7	8	9	10	Final
British Columbia (Lepine)	3	0	0	6	2	2	2	X	X	X	15
Northwest Territories (McKellar-Gillis)	0	1	1	0	0	0	0	X	X	X	2

==== Second knockout ====
Friday, March 15, 8:00 am

Sheet 6	1	2	3	4	5	6	7	8	9	10	Final
Northwest Territories (McKellar-Gillis) 🔨	1	0	0	1	1	2	0	2	1	1	9
Yukon (Grant)	0	2	4	0	0	0	1	0	0	0	7

== Teams ==
The teams are listed as follows:

Province	Skip	Third	Second	Lead	Locale
Alberta	Deb Santos	Jackie Rae Greening	Diana Backer	Glenna Rubin	St. Albert Curling Club, St. Albert
British Columbia	Karen Lepine	Lorraine Jeffries	Carol Martel	Betsy Terpsma	Langley Curling Club, Langley
Manitoba	Lois Fowler	Gwen Wooley	Lori Manning	Joan Robertson	Brandon Curling Club, Brandon
New Brunswick	Heidi Hanlon	Kathy Floyd	Judy Blanchard	Jane Arseneau	Thistle St. Andrews Curling Club, Saint John
Newfoundland and Labrador	Laura Phillips	Marian Dawe	Wendy Chaulk	Jeannette Hodder	Re/MAX Centre, St. John's
Northern Ontario	Vicky Barrett	Marg McLaughlin	Valerie MacInnes	Brenda Harrow	Sudbury Curling Club, Sudbury
Northwest Territories	Ann McKellar-Gillis	Marie Coe	Louise Marcinkoski	Margaret Begg	Yellowknife Curling Club, Yellowknife
Nova Scotia	Colleen Pinkney	Wendy Currie	Shelley MacNutt	Susan Creelman	Truro Curling Club, Truro
Ontario	Judy Oryniak	Rosemary Gowman	Twyla Gilbert	Katie Nell	Galt Curling Club, Cambridge
Prince Edward Island	Nola Murphy	Donna Arsenault	Elspeth Carmody	Laurie Tirone	Silver Fox Curling & Yacht Club, Summerside
Quebec	Catherine Derick	Sylvie Daniel	Chantal Gadoua	Cheryl Morgan	Club de curling Thurso, Thurso
Saskatchewan	Cathy Inglis	Pat Kuspira	Donna Liebrecht	Bev Fuches	Yorkton Curling Club, Yorkton

== Round-robin standings ==
Final round-robin standings

Key
Teams to Playoffs
Teams to Tiebreaker

Province	Skip	W	L
Nova Scotia	Colleen Pinkney	10	1
Alberta	Deb Santos	8	3
Quebec	Catherine Derick	7	4
Manitoba	Lois Fowler	7	4
Northern Ontario	Vicky Barrett	6	5
New Brunswick	Heidi Hanlon	6	5
Newfoundland and Labrador	Laura Phillips	5	6
Saskatchewan	Cathy Inglis	5	6
British Columbia	Karen Lepine	5	6
Ontario	Judy Oryniak	3	8
Northwest Territories	Ann McKellar-Gillis	3	8
Prince Edward Island	Nola Murphy	1	10

== Round-robin results ==
All draw times are listed in Atlantic Daylight Time (UTC-3).

=== Draw 1 ===
Saturday, March 16, 10:00 am

Sheet A	1	2	3	4	5	6	7	8	9	10	Final
Newfoundland and Labrador (Phillips)	0	1	0	4	0	0	3	0	0	2	10
Northwest Territories (McKellar-Gillis) 🔨	1	0	2	0	2	1	0	1	2	0	9

Sheet B	1	2	3	4	5	6	7	8	9	10	Final
Alberta (Santos)	0	4	1	3	0	1	0	0	2	X	11
Prince Edward Island (Murphy) 🔨	1	0	0	0	1	0	1	4	0	X	7

Sheet C	1	2	3	4	5	6	7	8	9	10	Final
Nova Scotia (Pinkney) 🔨	1	2	0	0	1	0	3	0	3	X	10
Northern Ontario (Barrett)	0	0	1	1	0	1	0	1	0	X	4

Sheet D	1	2	3	4	5	6	7	8	9	10	Final
New Brunswick (Hanlon)	2	0	3	0	0	3	0	1	1	X	10
British Columbia (Lepine) 🔨	0	0	0	3	2	0	2	0	0	X	7

Sheet E	1	2	3	4	5	6	7	8	9	10	11	Final
Manitoba (Fowler)	0	2	0	0	2	0	2	0	2	0	1	9
Ontario (Oryniak) 🔨	2	0	0	2	0	2	0	1	0	1	0	8

Sheet F	1	2	3	4	5	6	7	8	9	10	Final
Saskatchewan (Inglis)	0	0	2	0	0	2	0	X	X	X	4
Quebec (Derick) 🔨	3	1	0	2	3	0	2	X	X	X	11

=== Draw 3 ===
Saturday, March 16, 7:00 pm

Sheet A	1	2	3	4	5	6	7	8	9	10	Final
New Brunswick (Hanlon)	0	2	0	2	0	0	2	1	1	1	9
Manitoba (Fowler) 🔨	3	0	3	0	3	1	0	0	0	0	10

Sheet B	1	2	3	4	5	6	7	8	9	10	11	Final
British Columbia (Lepine) 🔨	1	0	0	2	0	1	0	3	0	1	0	8
Nova Scotia (Pinkney)	0	0	1	0	5	0	1	0	1	0	1	9

Sheet C	1	2	3	4	5	6	7	8	9	10	Final
Saskatchewan (Inglis)	0	1	0	1	0	0	1	0	0	X	3
Newfoundland and Labrador (Phillips) 🔨	1	0	0	0	0	2	0	1	1	X	5

Sheet D	1	2	3	4	5	6	7	8	9	10	Final
Prince Edward Island (Murphy)	0	2	0	1	0	1	2	0	0	X	6
Quebec (Derick) 🔨	1	0	4	0	3	0	0	2	3	X	13

Sheet E	1	2	3	4	5	6	7	8	9	10	Final
Alberta (Santos) 🔨	2	3	0	4	0	2	0	0	2	X	13
Northwest Territories (McKellar-Gillis)	0	0	3	0	3	0	2	1	0	X	9

Sheet F	1	2	3	4	5	6	7	8	9	10	Final
Northern Ontario (Barrett)	0	1	0	1	0	0	2	1	0	1	6
Ontario (Oryniak) 🔨	1	0	2	0	1	0	0	0	1	0	5

=== Draw 5 ===
Sunday, March 17, 2:30 pm

Sheet C	1	2	3	4	5	6	7	8	9	10	Final
New Brunswick (Hanlon) 🔨	1	0	2	0	0	1	0	1	0	3	8
Ontario (Oryniak)	0	1	0	0	3	0	1	0	2	0	7

Sheet E	1	2	3	4	5	6	7	8	9	10	Final
Nova Scotia (Pinkney) 🔨	1	0	2	0	0	0	0	0	2	1	6
Quebec (Derick)	0	1	0	0	0	1	1	1	0	0	4

Sheet F	1	2	3	4	5	6	7	8	9	10	Final
Newfoundland and Labrador (Phillips)	0	1	0	0	2	0	1	0	1	X	5
Alberta (Santos) 🔨	4	0	0	2	0	1	0	2	0	X	9

=== Draw 6 ===
Sunday, March 17, 7:00 pm

Sheet A	1	2	3	4	5	6	7	8	9	10	Final
British Columbia (Lepine)	0	1	1	0	3	3	0	1	0	X	9
Prince Edward Island (Murphy) 🔨	0	0	0	2	0	0	1	0	2	X	5

Sheet B	1	2	3	4	5	6	7	8	9	10	Final
Saskatchewan (Inglis)	0	1	0	1	1	0	0	2	2	0	7
Northwest Territories (McKellar-Gillis) 🔨	1	0	2	0	0	2	2	0	0	2	9

Sheet D	1	2	3	4	5	6	7	8	9	10	11	Final
Manitoba (Fowler) 🔨	3	0	0	0	0	1	0	1	1	1	1	8
Northern Ontario (Barrett)	0	2	1	1	2	0	1	0	0	0	0	7

=== Draw 7 ===
Monday, March 18, 10:00 am

Sheet B	1	2	3	4	5	6	7	8	9	10	Final
Quebec (Derick) 🔨	1	0	2	0	3	0	1	1	0	1	9
Alberta (Santos)	0	2	0	1	0	2	0	0	2	0	7

Sheet D	1	2	3	4	5	6	7	8	9	10	Final
Ontario (Oryniak)	0	0	3	0	0	0	2	0	X	X	5
Newfoundland and Labrador (Phillips) 🔨	3	1	0	4	3	1	0	1	X	X	13

Sheet F	1	2	3	4	5	6	7	8	9	10	Final
Nova Scotia (Pinkney) 🔨	2	0	0	1	1	1	0	0	2	1	8
New Brunswick (Hanlon)	0	2	2	0	0	0	2	0	0	0	6

=== Draw 8 ===
Monday, March 18, 2:30 pm

Sheet A	1	2	3	4	5	6	7	8	9	10	Final
Northwest Territories (McKellar-Gillis)	0	1	0	1	3	0	0	0	0	X	5
Northern Ontario (Barrett) 🔨	1	0	5	0	0	2	1	1	1	X	11

Sheet C	1	2	3	4	5	6	7	8	9	10	Final
Manitoba (Fowler)	0	0	0	3	0	0	5	0	3	X	11
Prince Edward Island (Murphy) 🔨	0	1	2	0	1	1	0	1	0	X	6

Sheet E	1	2	3	4	5	6	7	8	9	10	Final
Saskatchewan (Inglis) 🔨	3	1	0	2	0	1	0	0	1	X	8
British Columbia (Lepine)	0	0	2	0	3	0	0	0	0	X	5

=== Draw 9 ===
Monday, March 18, 7:00 pm

Sheet A	1	2	3	4	5	6	7	8	9	10	Final
Quebec (Derick)	0	2	0	1	0	0	0	1	0	X	4
Ontario (Oryniak) 🔨	1	0	1	0	3	3	1	0	2	X	11

Sheet B	1	2	3	4	5	6	7	8	9	10	Final
Newfoundland and Labrador (Phillips) 🔨	0	2	0	0	1	0	1	1	1	X	6
New Brunswick (Hanlon)	0	0	3	2	0	2	0	0	0	X	7

Sheet C	1	2	3	4	5	6	7	8	9	10	Final
Alberta (Santos)	1	0	1	0	0	0	2	X	X	X	4
Nova Scotia (Pinkney) 🔨	0	3	0	4	1	2	0	X	X	X	10

=== Draw 10 ===
Tuesday, March 19, 10:00 am

Sheet D	1	2	3	4	5	6	7	8	9	10	Final
British Columbia (Lepine) 🔨	0	0	1	0	2	0	1	0	X	X	4
Northwest Territories (McKellar-Gillis)	2	1	0	2	0	2	0	3	X	X	10

Sheet E	1	2	3	4	5	6	7	8	9	10	Final
Northern Ontario (Barrett)	0	2	0	3	0	4	1	2	X	X	12
Prince Edward Island (Murphy) 🔨	1	0	2	0	2	0	0	0	X	X	5

Sheet F	1	2	3	4	5	6	7	8	9	10	Final
Manitoba (Fowler) 🔨	1	0	1	0	1	0	1	1	0	0	5
Saskatchewan (Inglis)	0	1	0	2	0	0	0	0	2	3	8

=== Draw 11 ===
Tuesday, March 19, 2:30 pm

Sheet A	1	2	3	4	5	6	7	8	9	10	Final
Alberta (Santos) 🔨	1	0	0	0	0	1	1	0	0	X	3
New Brunswick (Hanlon)	0	2	1	0	0	0	0	1	2	X	6

Sheet B	1	2	3	4	5	6	7	8	9	10	11	Final
Nova Scotia (Pinkney)	0	2	0	1	0	1	0	0	1	0	1	6
Ontario (Oryniak) 🔨	1	0	0	0	1	0	0	2	0	1	0	5

Sheet C	1	2	3	4	5	6	7	8	9	10	Final
Newfoundland and Labrador (Phillips) 🔨	1	0	0	0	1	1	0	1	1	0	5
Quebec (Derick)	0	2	0	2	0	0	1	0	0	2	7

=== Draw 12 ===
Tuesday, March 19, 7:00 pm

Sheet D	1	2	3	4	5	6	7	8	9	10	Final
Saskatchewan (Inglis) 🔨	3	2	0	0	5	0	5	X	X	X	15
Prince Edward Island (Murphy)	0	0	1	1	0	1	0	X	X	X	3

Sheet E	1	2	3	4	5	6	7	8	9	10	Final
Northwest Territories (McKellar-Gillis)	0	0	2	0	1	0	3	X	X	X	6
Manitoba (Fowler) 🔨	3	3	0	2	0	5	0	X	X	X	13

Sheet F	1	2	3	4	5	6	7	8	9	10	Final
British Columbia (Lepine)	0	2	1	0	3	1	0	1	0	1	9
Northern Ontario (Barrett) 🔨	1	0	0	2	0	0	2	0	3	0	8

=== Draw 13 ===
Wednesday, March 20, 10:00 am

Sheet A	1	2	3	4	5	6	7	8	9	10	Final
Nova Scotia (Pinkney) 🔨	0	2	2	1	1	0	1	X	X	X	7
Newfoundland and Labrador (Phillips)	0	0	0	0	0	1	0	X	X	X	1

Sheet D	1	2	3	4	5	6	7	8	9	10	Final
Quebec (Derick) 🔨	3	0	1	1	0	2	1	3	X	X	11
New Brunswick (Hanlon)	0	2	0	0	3	0	0	0	X	X	5

Sheet E	1	2	3	4	5	6	7	8	9	10	Final
Ontario (Oryniak)	2	0	1	0	0	0	1	0	0	X	4
Alberta (Santos) 🔨	0	2	0	1	1	1	0	3	1	X	9

=== Draw 14 ===
Wednesday, March 20, 2:30 pm

Sheet B	1	2	3	4	5	6	7	8	9	10	Final
Manitoba (Fowler)	1	0	0	0	2	0	1	0	2	0	6
British Columbia (Lepine) 🔨	0	0	2	1	0	2	0	1	0	2	8

Sheet C	1	2	3	4	5	6	7	8	9	10	Final
Northern Ontario (Barrett)	0	0	0	1	0	1	0	X	X	X	2
Saskatchewan (Inglis) 🔨	0	1	0	0	5	0	2	X	X	X	8

Sheet F	1	2	3	4	5	6	7	8	9	10	Final
Northwest Territories (McKellar-Gillis)	0	0	0	1	2	1	0	2	0	X	6
Prince Edward Island (Murphy) 🔨	2	2	1	0	0	0	1	0	4	X	10

=== Draw 15 ===
Wednesday, March 20, 7:00 pm

Sheet A	1	2	3	4	5	6	7	8	9	10	11	Final
Ontario (Oryniak)	0	0	2	0	2	0	1	0	1	1	0	7
British Columbia (Lepine) 🔨	2	1	0	1	0	1	0	2	0	0	1	8

Sheet B	1	2	3	4	5	6	7	8	9	10	Final
Northwest Territories (McKellar-Gillis)	0	0	1	0	0	0	0	X	X	X	1
Quebec (Derick) 🔨	1	1	0	5	2	1	3	X	X	X	13

Sheet C	1	2	3	4	5	6	7	8	9	10	Final
Prince Edward Island (Murphy)	0	0	1	0	0	0	2	X	X	X	3
New Brunswick (Hanlon) 🔨	3	1	0	3	2	1	0	X	X	X	10

Sheet D	1	2	3	4	5	6	7	8	9	10	11	Final
Nova Scotia (Pinkney) 🔨	1	0	1	0	0	2	0	3	0	0	2	9
Saskatchewan (Inglis)	0	1	0	1	1	0	2	0	1	1	0	7

Sheet E	1	2	3	4	5	6	7	8	9	10	Final
Newfoundland and Labrador (Phillips)	0	1	1	0	0	0	0	0	X	X	2
Northern Ontario (Barrett) 🔨	1	0	0	3	1	1	1	1	X	X	8

Sheet F	1	2	3	4	5	6	7	8	9	10	Final
Alberta (Santos)	0	1	0	1	0	1	0	2	1	2	8
Manitoba (Fowler) 🔨	1	0	1	0	3	0	2	0	0	0	7

=== Draw 17 ===
Thursday, March 21, 12:00 pm

Sheet A	1	2	3	4	5	6	7	8	9	10	Final
Northern Ontario (Barrett)	0	0	1	0	1	1	2	0	1	1	7
Quebec (Derick) 🔨	1	0	0	1	0	0	0	2	0	0	4

Sheet B	1	2	3	4	5	6	7	8	9	10	Final
Ontario (Oryniak) 🔨	0	0	1	1	1	0	0	0	0	X	3
Saskatchewan (Inglis)	2	0	0	0	0	1	1	1	3	X	8

Sheet C	1	2	3	4	5	6	7	8	9	10	Final
British Columbia (Lepine)	0	1	1	1	2	0	0	1	0	0	6
Alberta (Santos) 🔨	0	0	0	0	0	2	1	0	2	2	7

Sheet D	1	2	3	4	5	6	7	8	9	10	Final
Newfoundland and Labrador (Phillips) 🔨	1	0	0	0	1	0	0	0	3	1	6
Manitoba (Fowler)	0	1	1	0	0	1	1	3	0	0	7

Sheet E	1	2	3	4	5	6	7	8	9	10	Final
Prince Edward Island (Murphy)	0	3	1	0	1	0	0	1	2	0	8
Nova Scotia (Pinkney) 🔨	2	0	0	2	0	2	2	0	0	3	11

Sheet F	1	2	3	4	5	6	7	8	9	10	Final
New Brunswick (Hanlon) 🔨	0	1	0	2	2	0	0	0	2	X	7
Northwest Territories (McKellar-Gillis)	3	0	3	0	0	3	1	1	0	X	11

=== Draw 19 ===
Thursday, March 21, 8:00 pm

Sheet A	1	2	3	4	5	6	7	8	9	10	Final
Saskatchewan (Inglis) 🔨	0	0	1	1	0	0	0	1	1	0	4
Alberta (Santos)	0	1	0	0	0	0	2	0	0	2	5

Sheet B	1	2	3	4	5	6	7	8	9	10	11	Final
New Brunswick (Hanlon)	0	1	0	2	0	3	0	2	0	1	0	9
Northern Ontario (Barrett) 🔨	1	0	4	0	1	0	2	0	1	0	2	11

Sheet C	1	2	3	4	5	6	7	8	9	10	Final
Quebec (Derick)	0	1	0	1	0	3	1	0	1	1	8
Manitoba (Fowler) 🔨	1	0	1	0	3	0	0	1	0	0	6

Sheet D	1	2	3	4	5	6	7	8	9	10	Final
Northwest Territories (McKellar-Gillis) 🔨	1	0	1	0	0	3	0	X	X	X	5
Nova Scotia (Pinkney)	0	5	0	5	1	0	2	X	X	X	13

Sheet E	1	2	3	4	5	6	7	8	9	10	Final
British Columbia (Lepine) 🔨	0	1	0	1	1	1	2	0	0	0	6
Newfoundland and Labrador (Phillips)	1	0	3	0	0	0	0	2	1	1	8

Sheet F	1	2	3	4	5	6	7	8	9	10	Final
Prince Edward Island (Murphy)	1	0	2	0	0	0	0	1	1	X	5
Ontario (Oryniak)	0	1	0	3	1	2	1	0	0	X	8

=== Draw 21 ===
Friday, March 22, 2:30 pm

Sheet A	1	2	3	4	5	6	7	8	9	10	Final
Manitoba (Fowler)	0	2	1	0	3	0	0	1	1	X	8
Nova Scotia (Pinkney) 🔨	2	0	0	1	0	1	0	0	0	X	4

Sheet B	1	2	3	4	5	6	7	8	9	10	Final
Prince Edward Island (Murphy)	0	0	2	0	0	0	X	X	X	X	2
Newfoundland and Labrador (Phillips) 🔨	4	5	0	4	1	0	X	X	X	X	14

Sheet C	1	2	3	4	5	6	7	8	9	10	Final
Ontario (Oryniak) 🔨	4	2	3	1	0	2	0	X	X	X	12
Northwest Territories (McKellar-Gillis)	0	0	0	0	2	0	1	X	X	X	3

Sheet D	1	2	3	4	5	6	7	8	9	10	Final
Northern Ontario (Barrett)	0	1	1	0	0	1	0	2	0	X	5
Alberta (Santos) 🔨	2	0	0	2	3	0	1	0	1	X	9

Sheet E	1	2	3	4	5	6	7	8	9	10	Final
New Brunswick (Hanlon) 🔨	0	1	3	0	3	0	0	2	X	X	9
Saskatchewan (Inglis)	0	0	0	1	0	2	1	0	X	X	4

Sheet F	1	2	3	4	5	6	7	8	9	10	Final
Quebec (Derick)	0	0	2	0	2	0	1	1	0	0	6
British Columbia (Lepine) 🔨	0	1	0	1	0	2	0	0	2	1	7

== Tiebreaker ==
Saturday, March 23, 8:00 am

Sheet E	1	2	3	4	5	6	7	8	9	10	Final
Quebec (Derick) 🔨	3	0	0	0	1	0	0	1	0	0	6
Manitoba (Fowler)	0	1	1	1	0	0	1	0	1	2	7

== Playoffs ==
Semifinal			Final
			1	Nova Scotia	7
2	Alberta	10	2	Alberta	6
3	Manitoba	4

=== Semifinal ===
Saturday, March 23, 2:00 pm

Sheet D	1	2	3	4	5	6	7	8	9	10	Final
Alberta (Santos) 🔨	1	0	3	0	2	1	3	0	X	X	10
Manitoba (Fowler)	0	0	0	2	0	0	0	2	X	X	4

=== Final ===
Sunday, March 24, 11:00 am

Sheet C	1	2	3	4	5	6	7	8	9	10	Final
Nova Scotia (Pinkney) 🔨	0	0	0	1	0	1	1	0	4	0	7
Alberta (Santos)	0	1	0	0	2	0	0	2	0	1	6
