= 2013 Canadian Senior Curling Championships =

- Host city: Summerside, Prince Edward Island
- Arena: Silver Fox Curling & Yacht Club
- Dates: March 16–24
- Men's winner: New Brunswick
- Curling club: Capital Winter Club, Fredericton
- Skip: Wayne Tallon
- Third: Mike Kennedy
- Second: Mike Flannery
- Lead: Wade Blanchard
- Finalist: Ontario (Howard Rajala)
- Women's winner: Nova Scotia
- Curling club: Truro Curling Club, Truro
- Skip: Colleen Pinkney
- Third: Wendy Currie
- Second: Shelley MacNutt
- Lead: Susan Creelman
- Finalist: Alberta (Deb Santos)

The 2013 Canadian Senior Curling Championships were held from March 16 to 24 at the Silver Fox Curling & Yacht Club in Summerside, Prince Edward Island. Summerside last hosted the Canadian Senior Championships in 2009. The winners of the championships will go on to represent Canada at the 2014 World Senior Curling Championships.

== Men ==
=== Round-robin standings ===
Final round-robin standings

Key
Teams to Playoffs
Teams to Tiebreaker

Province	Skip	W	L
New Brunswick	Wayne Tallon	10	1
Alberta	Wade White	9	2
Prince Edward Island	Rod MacDonald	8	3
Ontario	Howard Rajala	8	3
Nova Scotia	Alan O'Leary	6	5
Quebec	Robert Maclean	5	6
Manitoba	Bob Sigurdson	5	6
British Columbia	Craig Lepine	4	7
Saskatchewan	Gord Bell	4	7
Newfoundland and Labrador	Glenn Goss	4	7
Northern Ontario	Bruce Munro	3	8
Northwest Territories	Glen Hudy	0	11

=== Playoffs ===
Semifinal			Final
			1	New Brunswick	11
2	Alberta	5	3	Ontario	3
3	Ontario	11

==== Semifinal ====
Saturday, March 23, 7:00 pm

Sheet C	1	2	3	4	5	6	7	8	9	10	Final
Alberta (White)	0	2	0	2	0	0	1	0	X	X	5
Ontario (Rajala)	2	0	2	0	1	2	0	4	X	X	11

==== Final ====
Sunday, March 24, 11:00 am

Sheet D	1	2	3	4	5	6	7	8	9	10	Final
New Brunswick (Tallon)	0	2	1	3	0	4	0	1	X	X	11
Ontario (Rajala)	0	0	0	0	1	0	2	0	X	X	3

== Women ==
=== Round-robin standings ===
Final round-robin standings

Key
Teams to Playoffs
Teams to Tiebreaker

Province	Skip	W	L
Nova Scotia	Colleen Pinkney	10	1
Alberta	Deb Santos	8	3
Quebec	Catherine Derick	7	4
Manitoba	Lois Fowler	7	4
Northern Ontario	Vicky Barrett	6	5
New Brunswick	Heidi Hanlon	6	5
Newfoundland and Labrador	Laura Phillips	5	6
Saskatchewan	Cathy Inglis	5	6
British Columbia	Karen Lepine	5	6
Ontario	Judy Oryniak	3	8
Northwest Territories	Ann McKellar-Gillis	3	8
Prince Edward Island	Nola Murphy	1	10

=== Playoffs ===
Semifinal			Final
			1	Nova Scotia	7
2	Alberta	10	2	Alberta	6
3	Manitoba	4

==== Semifinal ====
Saturday, March 23, 2:00 pm

Sheet D	1	2	3	4	5	6	7	8	9	10	Final
Alberta (Santos)	1	0	3	0	2	1	3	0	X	X	10
Manitoba (Fowler)	0	0	0	2	0	0	0	2	X	X	4

==== Final ====
Sunday, March 24, 11:00 am

Sheet C	1	2	3	4	5	6	7	8	9	10	Final
Nova Scotia (Pinkney)	0	0	0	1	0	1	1	0	4	0	7
Alberta (Santos)	0	1	0	0	2	0	0	2	0	1	6
