= Karen Hennigar =

Canadian curler

- Curler
- Born: February 28, 1953 (age 73); Halifax, Nova Scotia

Team
- Curling club: Truro CC, Truro, NS

Curling career
- Member Association: Nova Scotia
- Hearts: 2 (1988, 2003)
Medal record
Curling
Representing Canada
World Senior Curling Championships
| Gold medal – first place | 2010 Chelyabinsk, Russia |

Karen Hennigar (born February 28, 1953) is a Canadian curler. She played second on the team that won the World Senior Women's Championship in 2010.

== Curling career ==
In 1988, Hennigar played in her first Scott Tournament of Hearts, playing lead for skip Judy Burgess. She would not return to the national championship until 2003, when she was the fifth player for skip Nancy McConnery. Two other times, in 1985 and 2007, Hennigar came very close to gaining entry into the Hearts tournament, finishing second in the Nova Scotia Tournament of Hearts.

In 2004 and 2005 Hennigar played second for Team Nova Scotia at the Canadian Senior Championships with skip Sue Anne Bartlett. Both times Team Nova Scotia just barely missed the playoffs, in 2004 being one win shy of forcing a tiebreaker and in 2005 losing a tiebreaker to Northern Ontario. Hennigar again played second, this time for skip Colleen Pinkney, at the 2009 Canadian Senior Curling Championships in Summerside, PEI. After only losing one game in the round robin Hennigar and Team Nova Scotia defeated British Columbia 6-4 in the final to win the gold medal. Hennigar and her team then went on to represent Canada at the 2010 World Senior Curling Championships in Chelyabinsk, Russia where they beat Switzerland in the final to take home Canada's 6th World Senior Curling Championship title.
