= 2020 Nova Scotia Scotties Tournament of Hearts =

- Host city: Dartmouth, Nova Scotia
- Arena: Dartmouth Curling Club
- Dates: January 20–26
- Winner: Team Arsenault
- Curling club: Mayflower Curling Club, Halifax
- Skip: Mary-Anne Arsenault
- Third: Christina Black
- Second: Jennifer Baxter
- Lead: Emma Logan
- Coach: Stuart MacLean
- Finalist: Colleen Jones

The 2020 Nova Scotia Scotties Tournament of Hearts, the provincial women's curling championship of Nova Scotia, was held from January 20 to 26 at the Dartmouth Curling Club in Dartmouth. The winning Mary-Anne Arsenault rink represented Nova Scotia at the 2020 Scotties Tournament of Hearts in Moose Jaw, Saskatchewan and finished with a 4–4 record. The event was held in conjunction with the 2020 Deloitte Tankard, the provincial men's curling championship.

Mary-Anne Arsenault defeated former teammate Colleen Jones 7–4 in the final to win her ninth Nova Scotia Scotties Tournament of Hearts.

== Qualification process ==
Qualification method	Berths	Qualifying team(s)
CTRS leaders	2	Jill Brothers; Tanya Hilliard
Qualifier	6	Mary Mattatall; Mary-Anne Arsenault; Theresa Breen; Julie McEvoy; Mary Myketyn-Driscoll; Colleen Jones

== Teams ==
The teams are listed as follows:

Skip	Third	Second	Lead	Alternate	Club(s)
Mary-Anne Arsenault	Christina Black	Jennifer Baxter	Emma Logan		Mayflower, Halifax
Theresa Breen	Marlee Powers	Jocelyn Adams	Amanda Simpson	Mary Sue Radford	Halifax, Halifax
Jill Brothers	Erin Carmody	Sarah Murphy	Jenn Brine		Mayflower, Halifax
Tanya Hilliard	Taylor Clarke	Mackenzie Proctor	Heather MacPhee		Dartmouth, Dartmouth
Kim Kelly (Fourth)	Colleen Jones (Skip)	Sheena Moore	Julia Colter		Mayflower, Halifax
Colleen Pinkney^{1}	Margaret Cutcliffe	Jill Alcoe-Holland	Andrea Saulnier		Glooscap, Kentville & Mayflower, Halifax
Julie McEvoy	Kelly Backman	Karlee Jones	Shelley Barker		Lakeshore, Lower Sackville
Mary Myketyn-Driscoll	Jessica Daigle	Brigitte MacPhail	Kaitlyn Veitch		Mayflower, Halifax

Notes

1. Colleen Pinkey is skipping Team Mattatall as Mary Mattatall is coaching the Taylour Stevens rink at the 2020 Canadian Junior Curling Championships.

== Round-robin standings ==
Final round-robin standings

Key
Teams to Playoffs
Teams to Tiebreaker

Skip	W	L
Mary-Anne Arsenault	6	1
Colleen Jones	6	1
Jill Brothers	4	3
Tanya Hilliard	4	3
Mary Myketyn-Driscoll	3	4
Theresa Breen	3	4
Team Mattatall	2	5
Julie McEvoy	0	7

== Round-robin results ==
All draw times are listed in Atlantic Standard Time (UTC-04:00).

=== Draw 1 ===
Monday, January 20, 8:00 pm

Sheet B	1	2	3	4	5	6	7	8	9	10	Final
Tanya Hilliard	0	0	2	0	0	2	0	1	1	X	6
Team Mattatall 🔨	1	0	0	0	1	0	1	0	0	X	3

Sheet C	1	2	3	4	5	6	7	8	9	10	Final
Jill Brothers 🔨	0	1	0	0	1	0	2	2	2	X	8
Mary Myketyn-Driscoll	0	0	1	1	0	1	0	0	0	X	3

Sheet D	1	2	3	4	5	6	7	8	9	10	Final
Mary-Anne Arsenault	1	0	4	0	0	2	0	0	1	2	10
Theresa Breen 🔨	0	1	0	1	2	0	2	1	0	0	7

Sheet E	1	2	3	4	5	6	7	8	9	10	Final
Colleen Jones 🔨	2	0	1	0	1	0	0	2	3	X	9
Julie McEvoy	0	0	0	1	0	1	1	0	0	X	3

=== Draw 2 ===
Tuesday, January 21, 2:00 pm

Sheet B	1	2	3	4	5	6	7	8	9	10	Final
Mary-Anne Arsenault 🔨	0	0	2	1	0	0	0	0	0	X	3
Mary Myketyn-Driscoll	0	1	0	0	1	1	2	1	1	X	7

Sheet C	1	2	3	4	5	6	7	8	9	10	Final
Tanya Hilliard	1	0	1	2	0	1	1	2	X	X	8
Julie McEvoy 🔨	0	0	0	0	2	0	0	0	X	X	2

Sheet D	1	2	3	4	5	6	7	8	9	10	Final
Colleen Jones	0	0	0	2	3	1	2	0	0	X	8
Team Mattatall 🔨	1	0	3	0	0	0	0	1	2	X	7

Sheet E	1	2	3	4	5	6	7	8	9	10	Final
Jill Brothers 🔨	0	2	0	1	0	0	3	0	0	X	6
Theresa Breen	1	0	2	0	2	1	0	2	2	X	10

=== Draw 3 ===
Wednesday, January 22, 9:00 am

Sheet B	1	2	3	4	5	6	7	8	9	10	Final
Colleen Jones	0	0	2	0	0	0	1	0	0	3	6
Theresa Breen 🔨	1	1	0	0	0	1	0	1	1	0	5

Sheet C	1	2	3	4	5	6	7	8	9	10	Final
Mary-Anne Arsenault	4	1	2	2	4	0	X	X	X	X	13
Team Mattatall	0	0	0	0	0	0	X	X	X	X	0

Sheet D	1	2	3	4	5	6	7	8	9	10	Final
Jill Brothers 🔨	2	2	1	0	0	2	0	0	3	X	10
Julie McEvoy	0	0	0	1	1	0	2	1	0	X	5

Sheet E	1	2	3	4	5	6	7	8	9	10	Final
Tanya Hilliard	0	0	4	0	1	0	6	X	X	X	11
Mary Myketyn-Driscoll 🔨	0	1	0	2	0	1	0	X	X	X	4

=== Draw 4 ===
Wednesday, January 22, 7:00 pm

Sheet B	1	2	3	4	5	6	7	8	9	10	Final
Team Mattatall	1	0	2	3	3	0	0	X	X	X	9
Julie McEvoy 🔨	0	2	0	0	0	1	1	X	X	X	4

Sheet C	1	2	3	4	5	6	7	8	9	10	Final
Theresa Breen	0	0	1	0	1	0	0	2	1	X	5
Mary Myketyn-Driscoll 🔨	1	1	0	1	0	1	4	0	0	X	8

Sheet D	1	2	3	4	5	6	7	8	9	10	Final
Tanya Hilliard	0	0	0	0	0	0	X	X	X	X	0
Colleen Jones 🔨	1	3	1	1	2	1	X	X	X	X	9

Sheet E	1	2	3	4	5	6	7	8	9	10	Final
Jill Brothers	1	0	2	0	0	1	0	0	0	X	4
Mary-Anne Arsenault 🔨	0	1	0	2	1	0	1	1	1	X	7

=== Draw 5 ===
Thursday, January 23, 2:00 pm

Sheet B	1	2	3	4	5	6	7	8	9	10	11	Final
Tanya Hilliard	0	0	0	2	0	1	3	0	2	0	1	9
Theresa Breen 🔨	1	2	1	0	0	0	0	2	0	2	0	8

Sheet C	1	2	3	4	5	6	7	8	9	10	Final
Jill Brothers 🔨	1	1	0	0	1	0	3	3	X	X	9
Team Mattatall	0	0	0	0	0	1	0	0	X	X	1

Sheet D	1	2	3	4	5	6	7	8	9	10	Final
Mary-Anne Arsenault	1	0	1	0	0	0	3	2	0	1	8
Julie McEvoy 🔨	0	1	0	1	1	3	0	0	1	0	7

Sheet E	1	2	3	4	5	6	7	8	9	10	Final
Colleen Jones 🔨	2	0	0	2	0	3	0	3	X	X	10
Mary Myketyn-Driscoll	0	1	0	0	1	0	1	0	X	X	3

=== Draw 6 ===
Friday, January 24, 9:00 am

Sheet B	1	2	3	4	5	6	7	8	9	10	Final
Jill Brothers	0	0	1	0	0	1	0	0	1	0	3
Colleen Jones 🔨	1	0	0	0	1	0	0	1	0	1	4

Sheet C	1	2	3	4	5	6	7	8	9	10	Final
Theresa Breen	0	0	2	2	1	0	1	1	X	X	7
Julie McEvoy 🔨	1	0	0	0	0	1	0	0	X	X	2

Sheet D	1	2	3	4	5	6	7	8	9	10	Final
Team Mattatall 🔨	0	1	1	0	2	0	4	X	X	X	8
Mary Myketyn-Driscoll	0	0	0	1	0	1	0	X	X	X	2

Sheet E	1	2	3	4	5	6	7	8	9	10	Final
Tanya Hilliard	0	0	0	0	3	0	2	0	X	X	5
Mary-Anne Arsenault 🔨	3	1	1	1	0	2	0	3	X	X	11

=== Draw 7 ===
Friday, January 24, 7:00 pm

Sheet B	1	2	3	4	5	6	7	8	9	10	Final
Julie McEvoy	0	0	2	0	2	0	1	0	0	X	5
Mary Myketyn-Driscoll 🔨	0	4	0	1	0	1	0	3	5	X	14

Sheet C	1	2	3	4	5	6	7	8	9	10	Final
Mary-Anne Arsenault	2	0	0	1	0	1	1	0	1	X	6
Colleen Jones 🔨	0	1	0	0	1	0	0	1	0	X	3

Sheet D	1	2	3	4	5	6	7	8	9	10	Final
Jill Brothers 🔨	0	0	0	2	0	2	0	1	1	X	6
Tanya Hilliard	0	0	0	0	1	0	1	0	0	X	2

Sheet E	1	2	3	4	5	6	7	8	9	10	Final
Team Mattatall 🔨	1	0	1	0	2	0	1	0	0	0	5
Theresa Breen	0	2	0	1	0	1	0	1	2	1	8

== Tiebreaker ==
Saturday, January 25, 9:00 am

Sheet C	1	2	3	4	5	6	7	8	9	10	Final
Jill Brothers 🔨	2	1	0	0	1	0	1	0	2	X	7
Tanya Hilliard	0	0	1	0	0	1	0	1	0	X	3

== Playoffs ==
Semifinal			Final
			1	Mary-Anne Arsenault	7
2	Colleen Jones	6	2	Colleen Jones	4
3	Jill Brothers	4

=== Semifinal ===
Saturday, January 25, 7:00 pm

Sheet C	1	2	3	4	5	6	7	8	9	10	Final
Colleen Jones 🔨	0	0	1	1	1	0	0	1	0	2	6
Jill Brothers	0	0	0	0	0	2	1	0	1	0	4

=== Final ===
Sunday, January 26, 2:30 pm

Sheet D	1	2	3	4	5	6	7	8	9	10	Final
Mary-Anne Arsenault 🔨	2	0	2	0	1	0	0	2	0	X	7
Colleen Jones	0	0	0	1	0	1	1	0	1	X	4

2020 Nova Scotia Scotties Tournament of Hearts

Mary-Anne Arsenault
9th Nova Scotia Provincial Championship title

== Qualification ==
=== Qualifier ===
December 13–15, Berwick Curling Club, Berwick

A1 Event		To Provincials
Colleen Jones (Mayflower)	7
Mary Myketyn-Driscoll (Mayflower)	2	Colleen Jones (Mayflower)	6
Mary Mattatall (Glooscap & Mayflower)	10	Mary Mattatall (Glooscap & Mayflower)	7
Cally Moore (Lakeshore)	6

A2 Event
Mary Day (CFB Halifax)	16
Virginia Jackson (Dartmouth)	7

Semifinals
Theresa Breen (Halifax)	4
Julie McEvoy (Lakeshore)	8
Mary-Anne Arsenault (Mayflower)	8
Mary Day (CFB Halifax)	3

To Provincials
Julie McEvoy (Lakeshore)	4
Mary-Anne Arsenault (Mayflower)	9

B1 Event		To Provincials
Theresa Breen (Halifax)	13
Mary Day (CFB Halifax)	2	Theresa Breen (Halifax)	8
		Colleen Jones (Mayflower)	5

B2 Event
Mary Myketyn-Driscoll (Mayflower)	9
Virginia Jackson (Dartmouth)	4

Semifinals
Mary Myketyn-Driscoll (Mayflower)	10
Cally Moore (Lakeshore)	3

To Provincials
Mary Myketyn-Driscoll (Mayflower)	7
Julie McEvoy (Lakeshore)	9

C1 Event		To Provincials
		Mary Myketyn-Driscoll (Mayflower)	10
Mary Day (CFB Halifax)	10	Mary Day (CFB Halifax)	5
Virginia Jackson (Dartmouth)	5

C2 Event / To Provincials
Colleen Jones (Mayflower)	9
Cally Moore (Lakeshore)	2
