= 2009 Canadian Senior Curling Championships =

- Host city: Summerside, Prince Edward Island
- Arena: Silver Fox Curling and Yacht Club
- Dates: March 21–28
- Men's winner: Ontario
- Curling club: Navy Curling Club, Ottawa
- Skip: Bruce Delaney
- Third: Rick Bachand
- Second: Duncan Jamieson
- Lead: George Mitchell
- Finalist: New Brunswick
- Women's winner: Nova Scotia
- Curling club: Truro Curling Club, Truro
- Skip: Colleen Pinkney
- Third: Wendy Currie
- Second: Karen Hennigar
- Lead: Susan Creelman
- Coach: Judy Burgess
- Finalist: British Columbia

The 2009 Canadian Senior Curling Championships was held March 21–28 at the Silver Fox Curling and Yacht Club in Summerside, Prince Edward Island. The winning teams represented Canada at the 2010 World Senior Curling Championships.

== Men's ==
=== Teams ===
Province / Territory	Skip	Third	Second	Lead
Newfoundland and Labrador	Bill Jenkins	Glenn Turpin	Bob Nugent	Jerry Oxford
Nova Scotia	Bryan MacPherson	Steve Elder	John Montgomery	Rollie Gauthier
Prince Edward Island	Mel Bernard	Blair Jay	Douglas Simmons	Earle Proude
New Brunswick	Russ Howard	Wayne Tallon	Mike Flannery	Marty Mockler
Quebec	Mike Carson	Jean-Marc McSween	Denis McSween	Raymond McSween
Ontario	Bruce Delaney	Rick Bachand	Duncan Jamieson	George Mitchell
Northern Ontario	Ian Fisher	Ed Premo	Juha Kantovaara	Don Maki
Manitoba	Brent Strachan	Dale Brooks	Tim Weber	Jim Strath
Saskatchewan	Eugene Hritzuk	Kevin Kalthoff	Verne Anderson	Dave Folk
Alberta	David Olsen	Doug Roche	Ed McConaghy	Dennis Nowicki
British Columbia	Brian Gessner	John Smiley	Bill Rafter	Craig McLeod
Northwest Territories/Yukon	Brad Whitehead	Brian Kelln	Norm Case	Tom Ross

=== Standings ===
Locale	Skip	W	L
Ontario	Bruce Delaney	8	3
New Brunswick	Russ Howard	8	3
Prince Edward Island	Mel Bernard	7	4
Saskatchewan	Eugene Hritzuk	7	4
Newfoundland and Labrador	Bill Jenkins	6	5
Manitoba	Brent Strachan	6	5
Alberta	David Olsen	6	5
British Columbia	Brian Gessner	6	5
Quebec	Mike Carson	4	7
Northern Ontario	Ian Fisher	3	8
Nova Scotia	Bryan MacPherson	3	8
Northwest Territories/Yukon	Brad Whitehead	2	9

=== Results ===
==== Draw 1 ====
Sheet A	1	2	3	4	5	6	7	8	9	10	Final
Prince Edward Island (Bernard)	0	0	1	2	0	2	0	1	3	X	9
Ontario (Delaney)	2	2	0	0	1	0	1	0	0	X	6

Sheet C	1	2	3	4	5	6	7	8	9	10	Final
Quebec (Carson)	1	0	1	1	0	0	2	0	0	X	5
Nova Scotia (MacPherson)	0	2	0	0	2	1	0	2	1	X	8

Sheet E	1	2	3	4	5	6	7	8	9	10	Final
Saskatchewan (Hritzuk)	2	1	0	1	1	0	0	0	1	X	6
Alberta (Olsen)	0	0	0	0	0	2	1	1	0	X	4

==== Draw 2 ====
Sheet A	1	2	3	4	5	6	7	8	9	10	Final
Northwest Territories/Yukon (Whitehead)	0	1	0	1	0	3	0	1	0	X	6
Manitoba (Strachan)	2	0	1	0	2	0	3	0	1	X	9

Sheet C	1	2	3	4	5	6	7	8	9	10	Final
Northern Ontario (Fisher)	0	0	0	1	0	0	0	1	0	X	2
New Brunswick (Howard)	0	1	2	0	0	1	0	0	2	X	6

Sheet E	1	2	3	4	5	6	7	8	9	10	Final
British Columbia (Gessner)	1	0	0	0	2	0	0	0	2	0	5
Newfoundland and Labrador (Jenkins)	0	0	1	1	0	0	1	2	0	3	8

==== Draw 3 ====
Sheet A	1	2	3	4	5	6	7	8	9	10	Final
Saskatchewan (Hritzuk)	0	1	0	1	0	1	0	2	0	X	5
Quebec (Carson)	0	0	0	0	2	0	1	0	0	X	3

Sheet C	1	2	3	4	5	6	7	8	9	10	11	Final
Prince Edward Island (Bernard)	0	2	0	1	1	0	1	1	0	0	1	7
Alberta (Olsen)	1	0	2	0	0	2	0	0	0	1	0	6

Sheet E	1	2	3	4	5	6	7	8	9	10	Final
Nova Scotia (MacPherson)	0	0	1	0	0	1	0	1	1	0	4
Ontario (Delaney)	0	0	0	1	1	0	1	0	0	2	5

==== Draw 4 ====
Sheet A	1	2	3	4	5	6	7	8	9	10	Final
Northern Ontario (Fisher)	0	3	0	0	0	2	0	1	0	X	6
British Columbia (Gessner)	2	0	1	1	2	0	1	0	2	X	9

Sheet C	1	2	3	4	5	6	7	8	9	10	Final
Newfoundland and Labrador (Jenkins)	0	4	0	0	2	3	1	0	0	2	12
Northwest Territories/Yukon (Whitehead)	1	0	2	1	0	0	0	1	1	0	6

Sheet E	1	2	3	4	5	6	7	8	9	10	11	Final
Manitoba (Strachan)	0	1	0	0	0	2	0	0	1	1	0	5
New Brunswick (Howard)	1	0	1	1	0	0	1	1	0	0	1	6

==== Draw 5 ====
Sheet B	1	2	3	4	5	6	7	8	9	10	Final
New Brunswick (Howard)	1	0	0	0	3	0	2	1	X	X	7
Newfoundland and Labrador (Jenkins)	0	0	0	1	0	1	0	0	X	X	2

Sheet D	1	2	3	4	5	6	7	8	9	10	Final
Quebec (Carson)	0	0	0	1	0	0	0	1	0	0	2
Ontario (Delaney)	0	1	0	0	0	0	2	0	0	1	4

Sheet E	1	2	3	4	5	6	7	8	9	10	Final
British Columbia (Gessner)	0	1	0	3	1	0	1	1	1	X	8
Northwest Territories/Yukon (Whitehead)	0	0	2	0	0	1	0	0	0	X	3

==== Draw 6 ====
Sheet B	1	2	3	4	5	6	7	8	9	10	Final
Northwest Territories/Yukon (Whitehead)	2	0	2	0	0	2	0	0	1	X	7
Northern Ontario (Fisher)	0	2	0	3	1	0	2	2	0	X	10

Sheet D	1	2	3	4	5	6	7	8	9	10	Final
Manitoba (Strachan)	1	0	0	1	0	2	0	1	X	X	5
Newfoundland and Labrador (Jenkins)	0	1	2	0	3	0	4	0	X	X	10

Sheet F	1	2	3	4	5	6	7	8	9	10	Final
British Columbia (Gessner)	0	0	1	0	2	0	1	0	0	0	4
New Brunswick (Howard)	1	2	0	1	0	0	0	0	0	1	5

==== Draw 7 ====
Sheet A	1	2	3	4	5	6	7	8	9	10	Final
Alberta (Olsen)	0	0	3	1	2	0	1	0	0	X	7
Nova Scotia (MacPherson)	0	0	0	0	0	1	0	2	1	X	4

Sheet D	1	2	3	4	5	6	7	8	9	10	Final
Prince Edward Island (Bernard)	1	0	0	1	0	2	0	1	0	1	6
Saskatchewan (Hritzuk)	0	3	0	0	1	0	1	0	0	0	5

Sheet F	1	2	3	4	5	6	7	8	9	10	Final
Northern Ontario (Fisher)	0	0	0	0	2	2	1	1	0	2	8
Manitoba (Strachan)	0	2	1	1	0	0	0	0	2	0	6

==== Draw 8 ====
Sheet B	1	2	3	4	5	6	7	8	9	10	Final
Saskatchewan (Hritzuk)	2	0	0	3	0	1	0	0	1	2	9
British Columbia (Gessner)	0	1	0	0	3	0	3	3	0	0	10

Sheet C	1	2	3	4	5	6	7	8	9	10	Final
Ontario (Delaney)	0	1	0	2	0	0	X	X	X	X	3
Manitoba (Strachan)	3	0	2	0	4	2	X	X	X	X	11

Sheet F	1	2	3	4	5	6	7	8	9	10	Final
Quebec (Carson)	1	0	2	0	1	2	2	0	X	X	8
Northwest Territories/Yukon (Whitehead)	0	1	0	1	0	0	0	0	X	X	2

==== Draw 9 ====
Sheet A	1	2	3	4	5	6	7	8	9	10	11	Final
Newfoundland and Labrador (Jenkins)	0	3	1	0	0	3	0	0	0	1	2	10
Northern Ontario (Fisher)	3	0	0	2	0	0	1	1	1	0	0	8

Sheet D	1	2	3	4	5	6	7	8	9	10	Final
Ontario (Delaney)	2	0	1	0	0	2	0	0	2	2	9
Alberta (Olsen)	0	1	0	2	2	0	1	2	0	0	8

Sheet E	1	2	3	4	5	6	7	8	9	10	Final
Nova Scotia (MacPherson)	0	1	0	1	0	1	0	2	0	0	5
New Brunswick (Howard)	2	0	3	0	1	0	1	0	1	1	9

==== Draw 10 ====
Sheet B	1	2	3	4	5	6	7	8	9	10	Final
New Brunswick (Howard)	0	1	0	3	1	0	2	3	X	X	10
Northwest Territories/Yukon (Whitehead)	2	0	1	0	0	1	0	0	X	X	4

Sheet D	1	2	3	4	5	6	7	8	9	10	Final
Northern Ontario (Fisher)	0	0	1	1	0	1	0	0	0	X	3
Prince Edward Island (Bernard)	1	0	0	0	1	0	2	1	1	X	6

Sheet F	1	2	3	4	5	6	7	8	9	10	Final
Alberta (Olsen)	0	1	3	2	0	0	0	2	6	X	14
Newfoundland and Labrador (Jenkins)	1	0	0	0	2	1	1	0	0	X	5

==== Draw 11 ====
Sheet A	1	2	3	4	5	6	7	8	9	10	Final
Quebec (Carson)	0	2	0	0	0	2	0	1	0	X	5
Prince Edward Island (Bernard)	1	0	1	1	1	0	3	0	1	X	8

Sheet D	1	2	3	4	5	6	7	8	9	10	Final
British Columbia (Gessner)	0	2	1	0	1	1	0	3	0	X	8
Manitoba (Strachan)	1	0	0	2	0	0	4	0	3	X	10

Sheet F	1	2	3	4	5	6	7	8	9	10	Final
Saskatchewan (Hritzuk)	1	0	0	0	1	1	3	2	X	X	8
Nova Scotia (MacPherson)	0	0	1	1	0	0	0	0	X	X	2

==== Draw 12 ====
Sheet B	1	2	3	4	5	6	7	8	9	10	11	Final
Manitoba (Strachan)	2	0	1	0	0	1	0	0	0	2	0	6
Quebec (Carson)	0	1	0	1	2	0	1	0	1	0	1	7

Sheet C	1	2	3	4	5	6	7	8	9	10	Final
Northwest Territories/Yukon (Whitehead)	1	0	1	0	0	0	X	X	X	X	2
Saskatchewan (Hritzuk)	0	3	0	1	2	3	X	X	X	X	9

Sheet E	1	2	3	4	5	6	7	8	9	10	Final
Ontario (Delaney)	0	1	0	1	2	0	0	2	0	0	6
British Columbia (Gessner)	0	0	0	0	0	2	1	0	1	1	5

==== Draw 13 ====
Sheet A	1	2	3	4	5	6	7	8	9	10	Final
New Brunswick (Howard)	0	0	1	0	2	1	0	1	0	0	5
Alberta (Olsen)	0	0	0	0	0	0	2	0	1	1	4

Sheet D	1	2	3	4	5	6	7	8	9	10	Final
Nova Scotia (MacPherson)	1	1	0	1	0	1	1	0	X	X	5
Northern Ontario (Fisher)	0	0	4	0	2	0	0	5	X	X	11

Sheet F	1	2	3	4	5	6	7	8	9	10	Final
Manitoba (Strachan)	0	1	0	0	0	3	0	2	0	1	7
Saskatchewan (Hritzuk)	1	0	1	1	1	0	2	0	0	0	6

==== Draw 14 ====
Sheet A	1	2	3	4	5	6	7	8	9	10	Final
Ontario (Delaney)	0	2	3	2	0	2	X	X	X	X	9
Northwest Territories/Yukon (Whitehead)	1	0	0	0	1	0	X	X	X	X	2

Sheet C	1	2	3	4	5	6	7	8	9	10	11	Final
British Columbia (Gessner)	0	0	0	0	0	2	0	0	2	1	3	8
Quebec (Carson)	0	1	0	0	1	0	2	1	0	0	0	5

Sheet E	1	2	3	4	5	6	7	8	9	10	Final
Prince Edward Island (Bernard)	1	0	0	0	0	1	0	2	0	0	4
Newfoundland and Labrador (Jenkins)	0	1	1	0	1	0	1	0	0	1	5

==== Draw 15 ====
Sheet A	1	2	3	4	5	6	7	8	9	10	Final
Nova Scotia (MacPherson)	2	0	2	0	0	2	0	0	2	0	8
British Columbia (Gessner)	0	1	0	1	1	0	3	2	0	2	10

Sheet C	1	2	3	4	5	6	7	8	9	10	Final
Alberta (Olsen)	1	0	2	0	1	0	2	1	0	0	7
Manitoba (Strachan)	0	2	0	2	0	1	0	0	2	1	8

Sheet E	1	2	3	4	5	6	7	8	9	10	Final
Northwest Territories/Yukon (Whitehead)	0	0	1	1	0	0	2	1	0	2	7
Prince Edward Island (Bernard)	0	2	0	0	0	2	0	0	1	0	5

==== Draw 16 ====
Sheet B	1	2	3	4	5	6	7	8	9	10	Final
Northern Ontario (Fisher)	1	0	0	0	0	1	0	X	X	X	2
Ontario (Delaney)	0	1	2	1	2	0	2	X	X	X	8

Sheet C	1	2	3	4	5	6	7	8	9	10	Final
Newfoundland and Labrador (Jenkins)	2	0	3	0	0	0	6	X	X	X	11
Saskatchewan (Hritzuk)	0	1	0	1	1	0	0	X	X	X	3

Sheet E	1	2	3	4	5	6	7	8	9	10	Final
New Brunswick (Howard)	2	1	1	0	0	1	0	0	2	X	7
Quebec (Carson)	0	0	0	2	1	0	0	1	0	X	4

==== Draw 17 ====
Sheet A	1	2	3	4	5	6	7	8	9	10	Final
Prince Edward Island (Bernard)	0	1	0	1	0	3	0	2	0	2	9
Manitoba (Strachan)	1	0	0	0	2	0	2	0	2	0	7

Sheet D	1	2	3	4	5	6	7	8	9	10	Final
Northwest Territories/Yukon (Whitehead)	3	0	0	1	0	1	0	2	0	1	8
Nova Scotia (MacPherson)	0	1	1	0	2	0	1	0	2	0	7

Sheet F	1	2	3	4	5	6	7	8	9	10	Final
Alberta (Olsen)	0	1	0	5	1	1	0	3	X	X	11
British Columbia (Gessner)	1	0	2	0	0	0	1	0	X	X	4

==== Draw 18 ====
Sheet A	1	2	3	4	5	6	7	8	9	10	Final
Saskatchewan (Hritzuk)	0	1	3	0	5	1	X	X	X	X	10
New Brunswick (Howard)	1	0	0	1	0	0	X	X	X	X	2

Sheet C	1	2	3	4	5	6	7	8	9	10	Final
Northern Ontario (Fisher)	1	0	0	0	2	0	X	X	X	X	3
Quebec (Carson)	0	3	2	2	0	3	X	X	X	X	10

Sheet F	1	2	3	4	5	6	7	8	9	10	Final
Newfoundland and Labrador (Jenkins)	0	0	0	1	0	1	1	1	0	X	4
Ontario (Delaney)	2	1	0	0	2	0	0	0	0	X	5

==== Draw 19 ====
Sheet A	1	2	3	4	5	6	7	8	9	10	Final
Quebec (Carson)	0	2	1	0	2	1	0	0	2	X	8
Newfoundland and Labrador (Jenkins)	2	0	0	1	0	0	1	2	0	X	6

Sheet D	1	2	3	4	5	6	7	8	9	10	Final
New Brunswick (Howard)	0	0	1	0	2	0	0	1	0	X	4
Ontario (Delaney)	1	0	0	2	0	2	0	0	5	X	10

Sheet F	1	2	3	4	5	6	7	8	9	10	Final
Saskatchewan (Hritzuk)	2	0	0	3	3	1	X	X	X	X	9
Northern Ontario (Fisher)	0	1	2	0	0	0	X	X	X	X	3

==== Draw 20 ====
Sheet B	1	2	3	4	5	6	7	8	9	10	Final
Ontario (Delaney)	0	1	0	2	0	0	1	1	0	X	5
Saskatchewan (Hritzuk)	1	0	1	0	1	2	0	0	5	X	10

Sheet D	1	2	3	4	5	6	7	8	9	10	Final
Quebec (Carson)	0	0	1	0	0	2	0	0	0	X	3
Alberta (Olsen)	0	1	0	1	1	0	0	1	3	X	7

Sheet F	1	2	3	4	5	6	7	8	9	10	Final
Nova Scotia (MacPherson)	2	0	0	0	0	1	1	0	0	2	6
Prince Edward Island (Bernard)	0	0	0	1	1	0	0	1	0	0	3

==== Draw 21 ====
Sheet B	1	2	3	4	5	6	7	8	9	10	Final
Northwest Territories/Yukon (Whitehead)	0	1	0	1	0	0	X	X	X	X	2
Alberta (Olsen)	6	0	2	0	1	4	X	X	X	X	13

Sheet C	1	2	3	4	5	6	7	8	9	10	Final
British Columbia (Gessner)	0	0	2	0	2	0	0	0	3	X	7
Prince Edward Island (Bernard)	0	0	0	1	0	1	1	1	0	X	4

Sheet E	1	2	3	4	5	6	7	8	9	10	Final
Manitoba (Strachan)	1	0	3	1	0	0	1	0	5	X	11
Nova Scotia (MacPherson)	0	2	0	0	0	1	0	2	0	X	5

==== Draw 22 ====
Sheet B	1	2	3	4	5	6	7	8	9	10	Final
Newfoundland and Labrador (Jackson)	0	0	0	1	0	1	X	X	X	X	2
Nova Scotia (MacPherson)	1	2	3	0	2	0	X	X	X	X	8

Sheet D	1	2	3	4	5	6	7	8	9	10	Final
Prince Edward Island (Bernard)	2	0	2	1	2	0	0	1	0	1	9
New Brunswick (Howard)	0	2	0	0	0	0	2	0	2	0	6

Sheet E	1	2	3	4	5	6	7	8	9	10	Final
Alberta (Olsen)	0	1	1	0	3	0	2	0	0	0	7
Northern Ontario (Fisher)	1	0	0	1	0	1	0	1	1	1	6

=== Playoffs ===
Tiebreaker		Semifinal		Final
Prince Edward Island	5
Saskatchewan	3	New Brunswick	7
		Prince Edward Island	5
				Ontario	10
				New Brunswick	4

==== Tiebreaker ====
Sheet C	1	2	3	4	5	6	7	8	9	10	Final
Prince Edward Island (Bernard)	0	0	0	0	2	0	0	2	0	1	5
Saskatchewan (Hritzuk)	0	1	0	0	0	2	0	0	0	0	3

Player percentages
Prince Edward Island		Saskatchewan	
Earle Proude	90%	Dave Folk	88%
Douglas Simmons	89%	Verne Anderson	83%
Blair Jay	91%	Kevin Kalthoff	75%
Mel Bernard	93%	Eugene Hritzuk	80%
Total	91%	Total	81%

==== Semifinal ====
Sheet D	1	2	3	4	5	6	7	8	9	10	Final
Prince Edward Island (Bernard)	0	0	0	2	0	1	0	2	0	0	5
New Brunswick (Howard)	1	0	0	0	2	0	3	0	0	1	7

Player percentages
Prince Edward Island		New Brunswick	
Earle Proude	94%	Marty Mockler	80%
Douglas Simmons	94%	Mike Flannery	69%
Blair Jay	85%	Wayne Tallon	90%
Mel Bernard	80%	Russ Howard	90%
Total	88%	Total	82%

==== Final ====
Sheet C	1	2	3	4	5	6	7	8	9	10	Final
New Brunswick (Howard)	0	1	1	0	1	0	1	0	0	X	4
Ontario (Delaney)	4	0	0	1	0	1	0	2	2	X	10

Player percentages
New Brunswick		Ontario	
Marty Mockler	82%	George Mitchell	96%
Mike Flannery	60%	Duncan Jamieson	74%
Wayne Tallon	61%	Rick Bachand	79%
Russ Howard	61%	Bruce Delaney	79%
Total	66%	Total	82%

== Women's ==
=== Teams ===
Province / Territory	Skip	Third	Second	Lead
Newfoundland and Labrador	Barbara Pinsent	Marian Dawe	Diane Ryan	Jeannette Hodder
Nova Scotia	Colleen Pinkney	Wendy Currie	Karen Hennigar	Susan Creelman
Prince Edward Island	Shirley Berry	Arleen Harris	Danielle Girard	Carol Sweetapple
New Brunswick	Sharon Levesque	Debbie Dickeson (skip)	Maureen McMaster	Carol Patterson
Quebec	Rolande Madore	Michele Page	Pauline Page	Lucille Daigle
Ontario	Cheryl McBain	Joyce Potter	Janelle Sadler	Diana Favel
Northern Ontario	Barbara Ward	Janice Atkinson	Kathleen Bes	Jan Alexander
Manitoba	Lois Fowler	Gwen Wooley	Lori Manning	Lynn Sandercock
Saskatchewan	Maxine Montgomery	Debbie Thierman (skip)	Debbie Cripps	Elaine McCloy
Alberta	Peggy Harper	Judy Pendergast	Deb Pendergast	Cheryl Meek
British Columbia	Kathy Smiley	Kerri Miller	Rita Imai	Linda Brunn
Northwest Territories/Yukon	Wendy Ondrack	Cheryl Burlington	Sandy Penkala	Lois Grabke

=== Standings ===
Locale	Skip	W	L
Nova Scotia	Colleen Pinkney	10	1
British Columbia	Kathy Smiley	9	2
Manitoba	Lois Fowler	9	2
Ontario	Cheryl McBain	7	4
Newfoundland and Labrador	Barbara Pinsent	6	5
Northern Ontario	Barbara Ward	5	6
Saskatchewan	Deb Thierman	4	7
Alberta	Peggy Harper	4	7
Quebec	Rolande Madore	4	7
Prince Edward Island	Shirley Berry	3	8
New Brunswick	Sharon Levesque	3	8
Northwest Territories/Yukon	Wendy Ondrack	2	9

=== Results ===
==== Draw 1 ====
Sheet B	1	2	3	4	5	6	7	8	9	10	Final
Prince Edward Island (Berry)	0	1	0	1	0	0	1	2	0	X	5
Ontario (McBain)	0	0	1	0	1	2	0	0	4	X	8

Sheet D	1	2	3	4	5	6	7	8	9	10	Final
Quebec (Madore)	0	0	1	0	1	0	0	0	X	X	2
Nova Scotia (Pinkney)	2	0	0	3	0	2	1	2	X	X	10

Sheet F	1	2	3	4	5	6	7	8	9	10	Final
Saskatchewan (Thierman)	0	3	0	0	3	0	0	2	0	3	11
Alberta (Harper)	3	0	2	1	0	1	1	0	1	0	9

==== Draw 2 ====
Sheet B	1	2	3	4	5	6	7	8	9	10	Final
Northwest Territories/Yukon (Ondrack)	0	0	0	0	0	0	2	1	0	X	3
Manitoba (Fowler)	1	1	1	2	2	0	0	0	2	X	9

Sheet D	1	2	3	4	5	6	7	8	9	10	Final
Northern Ontario (Ward)	0	1	0	0	0	0	2	0	0	0	3
New Brunswick (Levesque)	1	0	0	1	1	0	0	0	1	1	5

Sheet F	1	2	3	4	5	6	7	8	9	10	Final
British Columbia (Smiley)	1	0	2	5	1	1	1	X	X	X	11
Newfoundland and Labrador (Pinsent)	0	2	0	0	0	0	0	X	X	X	2

==== Draw 3 ====
Sheet B	1	2	3	4	5	6	7	8	9	10	Final
Saskatchewan (Thierman)	1	0	1	0	1	0	4	0	1	X	8
Quebec (Madore)	0	1	0	2	0	1	0	1	0	X	5

Sheet D	1	2	3	4	5	6	7	8	9	10	Final
Prince Edward Island (Berry)	0	1	0	3	1	0	1	0	0	0	6
Alberta (Harper)	3	0	2	0	0	0	0	2	0	0	7

Sheet F	1	2	3	4	5	6	7	8	9	10	Final
Nova Scotia (Pinkney)	0	1	0	1	1	1	3	1	X	X	8
Ontario (McBain)	1	0	1	0	0	0	0	0	X	X	2

==== Draw 4 ====
Sheet B	1	2	3	4	5	6	7	8	9	10	Final
Northern Ontario (Ward)	0	1	1	1	1	0	3	0	1	X	8
British Columbia (Smiley)	1	0	0	0	0	1	0	2	0	X	4

Sheet D	1	2	3	4	5	6	7	8	9	10	Final
Newfoundland and Labrador (Pinsent)	0	2	0	0	0	0	1	0	2	0	5
Northwest Territories/Yukon (Ondrack)	2	0	1	0	1	0	0	2	0	1	7

Sheet F	1	2	3	4	5	6	7	8	9	10	Final
Manitoba (Fowler)	0	2	0	0	2	3	0	1	1	X	9
New Brunswick (Levesque)	1	0	3	0	0	0	1	0	0	X	5

==== Draw 5 ====
Sheet A	1	2	3	4	5	6	7	8	9	10	Final
New Brunswick (Levesque)	0	0	0	0	1	0	2	0	1	X	4
Newfoundland and Labrador (Pinsent)	1	1	0	0	0	1	0	4	0	X	7

Sheet C	1	2	3	4	5	6	7	8	9	10	Final
Quebec (Madore)	1	0	0	2	0	0	2	0	2	X	7
Ontario (McBain)	0	2	2	0	1	1	0	3	0	X	9

Sheet F	1	2	3	4	5	6	7	8	9	10	Final
British Columbia (Smiley)	0	1	1	1	1	0	0	2	1	X	7
Northwest Territories/Yukon (Ondrack)	1	0	0	0	0	3	0	0	0	X	4

==== Draw 6 ====
Sheet A	1	2	3	4	5	6	7	8	9	10	Final
Northwest Territories/Yukon (Ondrack)	0	0	0	3	0	1	0	0	1	X	5
Northern Ontario (Ward)	1	0	1	0	2	0	1	2	0	X	7

Sheet C	1	2	3	4	5	6	7	8	9	10	Final
Manitoba (Fowler)	0	1	2	0	2	2	3	X	X	X	10
Newfoundland and Labrador (Pinsent)	3	0	0	1	0	0	0	X	X	X	4

Sheet E	1	2	3	4	5	6	7	8	9	10	Final
British Columbia (Smiley)	1	0	2	1	1	0	2	1	X	X	8
New Brunswick (Levesque)	0	1	0	0	0	1	0	0	X	X	2

==== Draw 7 ====
Sheet B	1	2	3	4	5	6	7	8	9	10	Final
Alberta (Harper)	0	0	0	0	1	1	0	X	X	X	2
Nova Scotia (Pinkney)	2	1	2	2	0	0	2	X	X	X	9

Sheet C	1	2	3	4	5	6	7	8	9	10	Final
Prince Edward Island (Berry)	0	2	1	0	1	1	2	1	0	X	8
Saskatchewan (Thierman)	0	0	0	3	0	0	0	0	1	X	4

Sheet E	1	2	3	4	5	6	7	8	9	10	Final
Northern Ontario (Ward)	0	0	0	1	1	0	2	0	X	X	4
Manitoba (Fowler)	1	0	2	0	0	4	0	4	X	X	11

==== Draw 8 ====
Sheet A	1	2	3	4	5	6	7	8	9	10	Final
Saskatchewan (Thierman)	0	1	0	0	1	2	0	0	X	X	4
British Columbia (Smiley)	2	0	2	2	0	0	2	2	X	X	10

Sheet D	1	2	3	4	5	6	7	8	9	10	Final
Ontario (McBain)	0	2	0	0	0	0	1	1	0	X	4
Manitoba (Fowler)	2	0	0	1	1	3	0	0	1	X	8

Sheet E	1	2	3	4	5	6	7	8	9	10	Final
Quebec (Madore)	1	0	2	1	0	1	0	1	3	X	9
Northwest Territories/Yukon (Ondrack)	0	1	0	0	2	0	1	0	0	X	4

==== Draw 9 ====
Sheet B	1	2	3	4	5	6	7	8	9	10	Final
Newfoundland and Labrador (Pinsent)	0	1	1	0	1	1	0	1	0	X	5
Northern Ontario (Ward)	2	0	0	1	0	0	2	0	3	X	8

Sheet C	1	2	3	4	5	6	7	8	9	10	Final
Ontario (McBain)	0	4	0	4	2	0	X	X	X	X	10
Alberta (Harper)	1	0	1	0	0	1	X	X	X	X	3

Sheet F	1	2	3	4	5	6	7	8	9	10	Final
Nova Scotia (Pinkney)	0	2	0	0	0	1	1	0	0	3	7
New Brunswick (Levesque)	1	0	0	2	1	0	0	0	0	0	4

==== Draw 10 ====
Sheet A	1	2	3	4	5	6	7	8	9	10	11	Final
New Brunswick (Levesque)	2	0	1	0	1	0	0	0	2	0	0	6
Northwest Territories/Yukon (Ondrack)	0	1	0	2	0	0	2	0	0	1	1	7

Sheet C	1	2	3	4	5	6	7	8	9	10	Final
Northern Ontario (Ward)	0	1	2	0	0	3	0	1	0	2	9
Prince Edward Island (Berry)	0	0	0	2	2	0	2	0	1	0	7

Sheet E	1	2	3	4	5	6	7	8	9	10	Final
Alberta (Harper)	2	0	0	0	0	0	0	0	X	X	2
Newfoundland and Labrador (Pinsent)	0	2	1	1	1	1	1	2	X	X	9

==== Draw 11 ====
Sheet B	1	2	3	4	5	6	7	8	9	10	Final
Quebec (Madore)	3	0	1	1	3	0	0	3	X	X	11
Prince Edward Island (Berry)	0	2	0	0	0	1	1	0	X	X	4

Sheet C	1	2	3	4	5	6	7	8	9	10	Final
British Columbia (Smiley)	0	0	1	0	0	0	1	0	1	1	4
Manitoba (Fowler)	0	0	0	1	0	0	0	2	0	0	3

Sheet E	1	2	3	4	5	6	7	8	9	10	Final
Saskatchewan (Thierman)	0	0	0	0	0	2	0	2	X	X	4
Nova Scotia (Pinkney)	2	1	1	1	3	0	1	0	X	X	9

==== Draw 12 ====
Sheet A	1	2	3	4	5	6	7	8	9	10	Final
Manitoba (Fowler)	1	0	0	2	0	0	1	1	1	1	7
Quebec (Madore)	0	0	1	0	2	1	0	0	0	0	4

Sheet D	1	2	3	4	5	6	7	8	9	10	Final
Northwest Territories/Yukon (Ondrack)	1	1	1	0	0	4	0	0	0	X	7
Saskatchewan (Thierman)	0	0	0	1	1	0	3	3	2	X	10

Sheet F	1	2	3	4	5	6	7	8	9	10	Final
Ontario (McBain)	0	0	1	0	1	1	0	0	1	0	4
British Columbia (Smiley)	0	0	0	2	0	0	0	1	0	2	5

==== Draw 13 ====
Sheet B	1	2	3	4	5	6	7	8	9	10	Final
New Brunswick (Levesque)	0	0	2	0	0	2	0	0	X	X	4
Alberta (Harper)	2	2	0	2	2	0	1	1	X	X	10

Sheet C	1	2	3	4	5	6	7	8	9	10	Final
Nova Scotia (Pinkney)	2	0	2	0	1	0	0	4	0	X	9
Northern Ontario (Ward)	0	1	0	1	0	1	2	0	1	X	6

Sheet E	1	2	3	4	5	6	7	8	9	10	Final
Manitoba (Fowler)	0	1	1	0	1	0	0	0	2	2	7
Saskatchewan (Thierman)	1	0	0	1	0	2	0	2	0	0	6

==== Draw 14 ====
Sheet B	1	2	3	4	5	6	7	8	9	10	Final
Ontario (McBain)	0	1	0	2	1	0	2	0	0	2	8
Northwest Territories/Yukon (Ondrack)	2	0	1	0	0	2	0	1	1	0	7

Sheet D	1	2	3	4	5	6	7	8	9	10	Final
British Columbia (Smiley)	2	0	0	3	0	3	0	X	X	X	8
Quebec (Madore)	0	0	1	0	1	0	1	X	X	X	3

Sheet F	1	2	3	4	5	6	7	8	9	10	Final
Prince Edward Island (Berry)	2	0	1	0	0	2	1	1	0	0	7
Newfoundland and Labrador (Pinsent)	0	5	0	1	1	0	0	0	1	1	9

==== Draw 15 ====
Sheet B	1	2	3	4	5	6	7	8	9	10	Final
Nova Scotia (Pinkney)	0	0	0	0	1	0	3	1	0	X	5
British Columbia (Smiley)	0	0	1	0	0	1	0	0	1	X	3

Sheet D	1	2	3	4	5	6	7	8	9	10	Final
Alberta (Harper)	0	0	0	1	0	1	1	0	0	0	3
Manitoba (Fowler)	1	0	0	0	1	0	0	1	1	2	6

Sheet F	1	2	3	4	5	6	7	8	9	10	Final
Northwest Territories/Yukon (Ondrack)	1	0	0	0	0	0	0	1	1	X	3
Prince Edward Island (Berry)	0	0	1	1	0	1	2	0	0	X	5

==== Draw 16 ====
Sheet A	1	2	3	4	5	6	7	8	9	10	Final
Northern Ontario (Ward)	0	1	0	0	0	1	0	0	X	X	2
Ontario (McBain)	2	0	0	1	1	0	3	1	X	X	8

Sheet D	1	2	3	4	5	6	7	8	9	10	Final
Newfoundland and Labrador (Pinsent)	0	2	0	1	1	1	0	0	1	X	6
Saskatchewan (Thierman)	0	0	1	0	0	0	0	1	0	X	2

Sheet F	1	2	3	4	5	6	7	8	9	10	Final
New Brunswick (Levesque)	2	0	0	1	2	0	0	0	0	3	8
Quebec (Madore)	0	2	0	0	0	1	1	1	2	0	7

==== Draw 17 ====
Sheet B	1	2	3	4	5	6	7	8	9	10	Final
Prince Edward Island (Berry)	0	0	2	0	1	0	0	1	0	0	4
Manitoba (Fowler)	1	0	0	1	0	1	1	0	0	1	5

Sheet C	1	2	3	4	5	6	7	8	9	10	Final
Northwest Territories/Yukon (Ondrack)	1	0	1	0	1	0	0	0	0	X	3
Nova Scotia (Pinkney)	0	1	0	1	0	1	1	1	2	X	7

Sheet E	1	2	3	4	5	6	7	8	9	10	11	Final
Alberta (Harper)	1	1	0	0	1	0	0	0	1	1	0	5
British Columbia (Smiley)	0	0	1	0	0	1	1	2	0	0	1	6

==== Draw 18 ====
Sheet B	1	2	3	4	5	6	7	8	9	10	Final
Saskatchewan (Thierman)	0	2	0	0	1	1	0	1	0	X	5
New Brunswick (Levesque)	1	0	1	1	0	0	1	0	4	X	8

Sheet D	1	2	3	4	5	6	7	8	9	10	Final
Northern Ontario (Ward)	1	0	2	1	0	0	0	0	2	0	6
Quebec (Madore)	0	1	0	0	1	1	1	3	0	1	8

Sheet E	1	2	3	4	5	6	7	8	9	10	11	Final
Newfoundland and Labrador (Pinsent)	0	1	1	0	0	1	1	0	0	1	1	6
Ontario (McBain)	1	0	0	1	1	0	0	0	2	0	0	5

==== Draw 19 ====
Sheet B	1	2	3	4	5	6	7	8	9	10	Final
Quebec (Madore)	0	1	2	0	0	0	0	3	1	X	7
Newfoundland and Labrador (Pinsent)	1	0	0	1	1	1	1	0	0	X	5

Sheet C	1	2	3	4	5	6	7	8	9	10	Final
New Brunswick (Levesque)	0	1	0	0	0	0	0	2	0	1	4
Ontario (McBain)	1	0	1	0	0	1	0	0	2	0	5

Sheet E	1	2	3	4	5	6	7	8	9	10	11	Final
Saskatchewan (Thierman)	0	0	2	0	3	1	0	0	0	1	1	8
Northern Ontario (Ward)	0	0	0	3	0	0	1	2	1	0	0	7

==== Draw 20 ====
Sheet A	1	2	3	4	5	6	7	8	9	10	11	Final
Ontario (McBain)	0	3	0	0	1	0	0	4	0	0	1	9
Saskatchewan (Thierman)	2	0	2	0	0	1	1	0	1	1	0	8

Sheet C	1	2	3	4	5	6	7	8	9	10	Final
Quebec (Madore)	1	0	0	0	2	0	0	0	0	X	3
Alberta (Harper)	0	1	0	1	0	0	3	1	1	X	7

Sheet E	1	2	3	4	5	6	7	8	9	10	Final
Nova Scotia (Pinkney)	0	2	0	1	0	1	2	2	X	X	8
Prince Edward Island (Berry)	1	0	1	0	1	0	0	0	X	X	3

==== Draw 21 ====
Sheet A	1	2	3	4	5	6	7	8	9	10	11	Final
Northwest Territories/Yukon (Ondrack)	0	0	2	0	0	0	0	2	0	3	0	7
Alberta (Harper)	2	0	0	0	1	2	1	0	1	0	2	9

Sheet D	1	2	3	4	5	6	7	8	9	10	Final
British Columbia (Smiley)	0	1	1	0	1	3	0	4	X	X	10
Prince Edward Island (Berry)	1	0	0	0	0	0	2	0	X	X	3

Sheet F	1	2	3	4	5	6	7	8	9	10	Final
Manitoba (Fowler)	0	1	0	0	1	0	0	1	0	X	3
Nova Scotia (Pinkney)	0	0	0	2	0	2	2	0	1	X	7

==== Draw 22 ====
Sheet A	1	2	3	4	5	6	7	8	9	10	Final
Newfoundland and Labrador (Pinsent)	0	2	0	0	1	0	0	1	1	1	6
Nova Scotia (Pinkney)	1	0	2	1	0	0	1	0	0	0	5

Sheet C	1	2	3	4	5	6	7	8	9	10	Final
Prince Edward Island (Berry)	2	0	2	0	0	0	0	1	1	X	6
New Brunswick (Levesque)	0	0	0	0	1	1	1	0	0	X	3

Sheet F	1	2	3	4	5	6	7	8	9	10	Final
Alberta (Harper)	1	0	1	0	1	0	1	0	1	X	5
Northern Ontario (Ward)	0	2	0	2	0	1	0	2	0	X	7

=== Playoffs ===
Semifinal		Final
British Columbia	6
Manitoba	5	Nova Scotia	6
		British Columbia	4

==== Semifinal ====
Sheet C	1	2	3	4	5	6	7	8	9	10	Final
British Columbia (Smiley)	2	0	1	0	1	0	0	2	0	X	6
Manitoba (Fowler)	0	2	0	1	0	1	0	0	1	X	5

Player percentages
British Columbia		Manitoba	
Linda Brunn	71%	Lynn Sandercock	79%
Rita Imai	73%	Lori Manning	80%
Kerri Miller	88%	Gwen Wooley	69%
Kathy Smiley	68%	Lois Fowler	69%
Total	75%	Total	74%

==== Final ====
Sheet D	1	2	3	4	5	6	7	8	9	10	Final
British Columbia (Smiley)	0	0	2	0	0	1	0	0	1	X	4
Nova Scotia (Pinkney)	0	2	0	0	2	0	1	1	0	X	6

Player percentages
British Columbia		Nova Scotia	
Linda Brunn	81%	Susan Creelman	85%
Rita Imai	73%	Karen Hennigar	84%
Kerri Miller	57%	Wendy Currie	78%
Kathy Smiley	61%	Colleen Pinkney	87%
Total	68%	Total	83%
