= Bruce Delaney =

Canadian curler from Ottawa

Medal record

Curling

World Senior Curling Championships
Silver medal – second place	2010 Chelyabinsk	

Bruce Delaney (born 1953) is a Canadian curler from Ottawa.

Delaney has won the Ontario Silver Tankard several times (including 1976, 1980, 1984, 1986, 1987, 2007, 2010), representing various clubs in Eastern Ontario, but usually representing the Navy Curling Club in Ottawa. He has won the annual City of Ottawa men's bonspiel Grand Aggregate Championship several times. Delaney was a competitive curler in Ontario in the 1970s and 1980s, but never made it to the Brier, Canada's national championship. He came the closest in 1986, when he lost the Labatt's Tankard provincial final against Russ Howard, playing third for Wayne Tallon.

Delaney has found more success as a senior (50+) curler, and is a 3 time provincial senior champion. His Navy rink of George Mitchell, Duncan Jamieson, and Rick Bachand won titles in 2006, 2008 and 2009. They won 2009 Canadian Senior Curling Championships against Russ Howard, now representing New Brunswick. This qualified them to represent Canada at the 2010 World Senior Curling Championships. At the World Seniors they took the Silver Medal, losing in the final to the United States. He also won two Ontario Masters Championships (2016 and 2018) losing the 2018 Canadian final to Ed Lukowich of Alberta.
