= 2015 World Senior Curling Championships =

- Host city: Sochi, Russia
- Arena: Iceberg Skating Palace
- Dates: 18–25 April
- Men's winner: United States
- Curling club: Granite CC, Seattle, Washington
- Skip: Lyle Sieg
- Third: Tom Violette
- Second: Ken Trask
- Lead: Steve Lundeen
- Alternate: Duane Rutan
- Finalist: Canada (Alan O'Leary)
- Women's winner: Canada
- Curling club: Brandon CC, Brandon
- Skip: Lois Fowler
- Third: Maureen Bonar
- Second: Cathy Gauthier
- Lead: Allyson Stewart
- Finalist: Italy (Fiona Grace Simpson)

The 2015 World Senior Curling Championships was from 18 to 25 April at the Iceberg Skating Palace in Sochi, Russia. The event was held in conjunction with the 2015 World Mixed Doubles Curling Championship.

== Men ==
=== Round-robin standings ===
Final round-robin standings

Key
| Teams to Playoffs |
| Teams to Tiebreaker |

| Group A | Skip | W | L |
|---|---|---|---|
| Canada | Alan O'Leary | 7 | 0 |
| Scotland | Gordon Muirhead | 5 | 2 |
| Ireland | Bill Gray | 4 | 3 |
| Czech Republic | Matej Neznal | 4 | 3 |
| Japan | Masayasu Sato | 4 | 3 |
| Italy | Danilo Capriolo | 2 | 5 |
| Latvia | Ansis Regža | 2 | 5 |
| Kazakhstan | Viktor Kim | 0 | 7 |

| Group B | Skip | W | L |
|---|---|---|---|
| Denmark | Ole de Neergaard | 7 | 0 |
| New Zealand | Hans Frauenlob | 6 | 1 |
| Sweden | Anders Westerberg | 4 | 3 |
| Norway | Halvard Kverne | 3 | 4 |
| England | John Summers | 3 | 4 |
| Hungary | Zoltán Palancsa | 3 | 4 |
| Russia | Sergey Narudinov | 2 | 5 |
| Turkey | Ahmet Şırınkan | 0 | 7 |

| Group C | Skip | W | L |
|---|---|---|---|
| United States | Lyle Sieg | 7 | 0 |
| Switzerland | Stefan Signer | 5 | 2 |
| Australia | Hugh Millikin | 5 | 2 |
| Finland | Kari Meranen | 4 | 3 |
| Germany | Wolfgang Burba | 4 | 3 |
| Slovakia | Ondrej Marček | 2 | 5 |
| France | Pascal Adam | 1 | 6 |
| Poland | Andrzej Janowski | 0 | 7 |

=== Playoffs ===
| Qualification Game |
| A3 | Ireland | 7 |
| C3 | Australia | 6 |

Quarterfinals
C1 | United States | 6
A3 | Ireland | 3
B2 | New Zealand | 5
C2 | Switzerland | 4
A1 | Canada | 9
B3 | Sweden | 3
A2 | Scotland | 4
B1 | Denmark | 5

Semifinals
C1 | United States | 9
B2 | New Zealand | 4
A1 | Canada | 5
B1 | Denmark | 3

Gold-medal game
C1 | United States | 9
A1 | Canada | 4

| Bronze-medal game |
| B2 | New Zealand | 6 |
| B1 | Denmark | 4 |

==== Bronze-medal game ====
Saturday 25 April, 13:00

| Sheet D | 1 | 2 | 3 | 4 | 5 | 6 | 7 | 8 | Final |
| New Zealand (Frauenlob) | 1 | 0 | 1 | 0 | 0 | 3 | 0 | 1 | 6 |
| Denmark (Nielsen) 🔨 | 0 | 1 | 0 | 1 | 1 | 0 | 1 | 0 | 4 |

==== Gold-medal game ====
Saturday 25 April, 13:00

| Sheet B | 1 | 2 | 3 | 4 | 5 | 6 | 7 | 8 | Final |
| Canada (O'Leary) 🔨 | 0 | 0 | 1 | 0 | 0 | 3 | 0 | X | 4 |
| United States (Sieg) | 1 | 2 | 0 | 1 | 2 | 0 | 3 | X | 9 |

== Women ==
=== Round-robin standings ===
Final round-robin standings

Key
| Teams to Playoffs |
| Teams to Tiebreaker |

| Group A | Skip | W | L |
|---|---|---|---|
| Sweden | Gunilla Arfwidsson Edlund | 5 | 1 |
| Finland | Kirsti Kauste | 4 | 2 |
| Switzerland | Susan Limena | 4 | 2 |
| Czech Republic | Ivana Kubešková | 3 | 3 |
| Scotland | Barbara Gibb | 3 | 3 |
| Japan | Shizuko Funaki | 1 | 5 |
| Russia | Tatiana Smirnova | 1 | 5 |

| Group B | Skip | W | L |
|---|---|---|---|
| United States | Norma O'Leary | 5 | 0 |
| Canada | Lois Fowler | 4 | 1 |
| England | Judith Dixon | 2 | 3 |
| Italy | Fiona Simpson | 2 | 3 |
| New Zealand | Wendy Becker | 2 | 3 |
| Slovakia | Margita Matuškovičová | 0 | 5 |

=== Playoffs ===
Quarterfinals
B2 | Canada | 5
A3 | Switzerland | 2
A2 | Finland | 3
B3 | Italy | 9

Semifinals
A1 | Sweden | 2
B2 | Canada | 11
B1 | United States | 6
B3 | Italy | 7

Final
B2 | Canada | 6
B3 | Italy | 2

| Bronze-medal game |
| A1 | Sweden | 4 |
| B1 | United States | 6 |

==== Bronze-medal game ====
Saturday 25 April, 13:00

| Sheet A | 1 | 2 | 3 | 4 | 5 | 6 | 7 | 8 | Final |
| United States (O'Leary) | 1 | 1 | 0 | 1 | 2 | 0 | 1 | 0 | 6 |
| Sweden (Edlund) 🔨 | 0 | 0 | 1 | 0 | 0 | 2 | 0 | 1 | 4 |

==== Gold-medal game ====
Saturday 25 April, 13:00

| Sheet C | 1 | 2 | 3 | 4 | 5 | 6 | 7 | 8 | Final |
| Italy (Simpson) | 0 | 1 | 0 | 1 | 0 | 0 | 0 | X | 2 |
| Canada (Fowler) 🔨 | 2 | 0 | 2 | 0 | 0 | 1 | 1 | X | 6 |
