= 2010 World Senior Curling Championships =

- Host city: Chelyabinsk, Russia
- Arena: Ural Lightning Ice Palace
- Dates: April 18–24
- Men's winner: United States
- Curling club: Hibbing CC, Hibbing, Minnesota
- Skip: Paul Pustovar
- Third: Brian Simonson
- Second: Tom Harms
- Lead: Don Mohawk
- Finalist: Canada
- Women's winner: Canada
- Curling club: Truro CC, Truro, Nova Scotia
- Skip: Colleen Pinkney
- Third: Wendy Currie
- Second: Karen Hennigar
- Lead: Susan Creelman
- Finalist: Switzerland

The 2010 World Senior Curling Championships were held from April 18 to 24 at the Ural Lightning Ice Palace in Chelyabinsk, Russia. They were held in conjunction with the 2010 World Mixed Doubles Curling Championship.

Teams from Scotland (men's and women's), Wales (men's), the Netherlands (men's) and Estonia (men's) withdrew from the tournament due to the air travel disruption after the 2010 Eyjafjallajökull eruption.

== Men's ==
=== Teams ===
| Country | Skip | Third | Second | Lead |
|---|---|---|---|---|
| Australia | Hugh Millikin | Ted Bassett | Tom Kidd | Rob Gagnon |
| Canada | Bruce Delaney | Rick Bachand | Duncan Jamieson | George Mitchell |
| England | John Brown | Alastair MacNish | John MacDougall | Robin Gemmell |
| Finland | Lauri Perkiö | Antti Sundholm | Jouko Riikonen | Jaakko Salonen |
| Hungary | András Rokusfalvy | Mihaly Veraszto | Laszlo Tolnai | Gyorgy Kalmar |
| Italy | Carlo Carrera | Bruni Paolo Mosca | Mario Bologna | Pasquale Valli |
| Japan | Masayasu Sato | Tomiyasu Goshima | Takahiro Hashimoto | Shozo Itoh |
| New Zealand | Peter Becker | Nelson Ede | David Greer | John Sanders |
| Russia | Alehander Kolesnikov | Sergia Melnikov | Sergei Korolenko | Sergey Narudinov |
| Switzerland | André Pauli | Fritz Pulfer | Pierre Zürcher | Daniel Grünenfelder |
| Sweden | Karl Nordlund | Göran Roxin | Wolger Johansson | Per-Arne Andersson |
| United States | Paul Pustovar | Brian Simonson | Tom Harms | Don Mohawk |

=== Standings ===
==== Group A ====
| Country | W | L |
|---|---|---|
| Canada | 5 | 0 |
| Switzerland | 4 | 1 |
| Sweden | 3 | 2 |
| Finland | 1 | 4 |
| Italy | 1 | 4 |
| New Zealand | 1 | 4 |

==== Group B ====
| Country | W | L |
|---|---|---|
| United States | 5 | 0 |
| Australia | 3 | 2 |
| Hungary | 3 | 2 |
| Japan | 3 | 2 |
| Russia | 1 | 4 |
| England | 1 | 4 |

=== Round-robin results ===
==== Red Group ====
===== Draw 1 =====
| Sheet J | 1 | 2 | 3 | 4 | 5 | 6 | 7 | 8 | Final |
| Canada (Delaney) | 0 | 2 | 2 | 2 | 0 | 0 | 1 | X | 7 |
| Switzerland (Pauli) 🔨 | 1 | 0 | 0 | 0 | 1 | 2 | 0 | X | 4 |

| Sheet K | 1 | 2 | 3 | 4 | 5 | 6 | 7 | 8 | Final |
| Italy (Carrera) 🔨 | 0 | 2 | 1 | 0 | 1 | 0 | 0 | 1 | 5 |
| New Zealand (Becker) | 1 | 0 | 0 | 0 | 0 | 2 | 1 | 0 | 4 |

===== Draw 2 =====
| Sheet F | 1 | 2 | 3 | 4 | 5 | 6 | 7 | 8 | Final |
| Switzerland (Pauli) | 0 | 1 | 0 | 3 | 0 | 2 | 0 | X | 6 |
| Italy (Carrera) 🔨 | 0 | 0 | 0 | 0 | 1 | 0 | 1 | X | 2 |

| Sheet I | 1 | 2 | 3 | 4 | 5 | 6 | 7 | 8 | Final |
| Finland (Perkiö) | 1 | 0 | 0 | 3 | 0 | 0 | 0 | X | 4 |
| New Zealand (Becker) 🔨 | 0 | 1 | 1 | 0 | 2 | 1 | 4 | X | 9 |

===== Draw 3 =====
| Sheet F | 1 | 2 | 3 | 4 | 5 | 6 | 7 | 8 | Final |
| Canada (Delaney) | 3 | 0 | 0 | 1 | 2 | 0 | 4 | X | 10 |
| New Zealand (Becker) 🔨 | 0 | 2 | 0 | 0 | 0 | 0 | 0 | X | 2 |

| Sheet G | 1 | 2 | 3 | 4 | 5 | 6 | 7 | 8 | Final |
| Sweden (Nordlund) 🔨 | 4 | 0 | 5 | 3 | 2 | 2 | X | X | 16 |
| Italy (Carrera) | 0 | 1 | 0 | 0 | 0 | 0 | X | X | 1 |

===== Draw 4 =====
| Sheet J | 1 | 2 | 3 | 4 | 5 | 6 | 7 | 8 | Final |
| Sweden (Nordlund) 🔨 | 0 | 2 | 0 | 1 | 0 | 1 | 1 | 0 | 5 |
| Canada (Delaney) | 1 | 0 | 2 | 0 | 3 | 0 | 0 | 0 | 6 |

| Sheet K | 1 | 2 | 3 | 4 | 5 | 6 | 7 | 8 | Final |
| Switzerland (Pauli) 🔨 | 2 | 0 | 2 | 1 | 1 | 0 | 1 | X | 7 |
| Finland (Perkiö) | 0 | 1 | 0 | 0 | 0 | 1 | 0 | X | 2 |

===== Draw 5 =====
| Sheet F | 1 | 2 | 3 | 4 | 5 | 6 | 7 | 8 | Final |
| Finland (Perkiö) | 0 | 1 | 0 | 2 | 0 | 2 | 0 | X | 5 |
| Canada (Delaney) 🔨 | 3 | 0 | 3 | 0 | 3 | 0 | 1 | X | 10 |

| Sheet I | 1 | 2 | 3 | 4 | 5 | 6 | 7 | 8 | Final |
| Switzerland (Pauli) | 3 | 1 | 0 | 1 | 0 | 1 | 0 | 1 | 7 |
| Sweden (Nordlund) 🔨 | 0 | 0 | 2 | 0 | 2 | 0 | 2 | 0 | 6 |

===== Draw 6 =====
| Sheet G | 1 | 2 | 3 | 4 | 5 | 6 | 7 | 8 | 9 | Final |
| Italy (Carrera) | 0 | 1 | 1 | 2 | 0 | 0 | 1 | 1 | 0 | 6 |
| Finland (Perkiö) 🔨 | 3 | 0 | 0 | 0 | 2 | 1 | 0 | 0 | 1 | 7 |

| Sheet K | 1 | 2 | 3 | 4 | 5 | 6 | 7 | 8 | Final |
| New Zealand (Becker) | 0 | 0 | 1 | 0 | 1 | 0 | 0 | X | 2 |
| Switzerland (Pauli) 🔨 | 1 | 1 | 0 | 1 | 0 | 1 | 3 | X | 7 |

===== Draw 7 =====
| Sheet F | 1 | 2 | 3 | 4 | 5 | 6 | 7 | 8 | Final |
| Sweden (Nordlund) 🔨 | 1 | 1 | 0 | 4 | 2 | 4 | X | X | 12 |
| Finland (Perkiö) | 0 | 0 | 1 | 0 | 0 | 0 | X | X | 1 |

| Sheet H | 1 | 2 | 3 | 4 | 5 | 6 | 7 | 8 | Final |
| Italy (Carrera) | 0 | 0 | 2 | 0 | 0 | 1 | X | X | 3 |
| Canada (Delaney) 🔨 | 3 | 3 | 0 | 4 | 1 | 0 | X | X | 11 |

===== Draw 8 =====
| Sheet J | 1 | 2 | 3 | 4 | 5 | 6 | 7 | 8 | Final |
| New Zealand (Becker) | 0 | 1 | 0 | 1 | 0 | 0 | 0 | X | 2 |
| Sweden (Nordlund) 🔨 | 2 | 0 | 2 | 0 | 2 | 1 | 2 | X | 9 |

==== Blue Group ====
===== Draw 1 =====
| Sheet K | 1 | 2 | 3 | 4 | 5 | 6 | 7 | 8 | 9 | Final |
| Hungary (Rokusfalvy) | 0 | 1 | 1 | 0 | 0 | 2 | 0 | 1 | 2 | 7 |
| Australia (Millikin) 🔨 | 1 | 0 | 0 | 2 | 0 | 0 | 2 | 0 | 0 | 5 |

===== Draw 2 =====
| Sheet G | 1 | 2 | 3 | 4 | 5 | 6 | 7 | 8 | Final |
| United States (Pustovar) | 3 | 3 | 2 | 2 | 2 | 1 | X | X | 13 |
| Russia (Kolesnikov) 🔨 | 0 | 0 | 0 | 0 | 0 | 0 | X | X | 0 |

===== Draw 3 =====
| Sheet K | 1 | 2 | 3 | 4 | 5 | 6 | 7 | 8 | Final |
| Hungary (Rokusfalvy) 🔨 | 1 | 0 | 0 | 0 | 1 | 0 | 0 | 0 | 2 |
| Japan (Sato) | 0 | 0 | 0 | 1 | 0 | 1 | 1 | 1 | 4 |

===== Draw 4 =====
| Sheet H | 1 | 2 | 3 | 4 | 5 | 6 | 7 | 8 | Final |
| Hungary (Rokusfalvy) | 0 | 1 | 0 | 0 | 1 | 0 | 1 | X | 3 |
| United States (Pustovar) 🔨 | 3 | 0 | 3 | 2 | 0 | 1 | 0 | X | 9 |

===== Draw 5 =====
| Sheet I | 1 | 2 | 3 | 4 | 5 | 6 | 7 | 8 | Final |
| Russia (Kolesnikov) | 0 | 0 | 1 | 0 | 1 | 1 | 0 | X | 3 |
| Australia (Millikin) 🔨 | 1 | 2 | 0 | 4 | 0 | 0 | 1 | X | 8 |

| Sheet K | 1 | 2 | 3 | 4 | 5 | 6 | 7 | 8 | Final |
| Japan (Sato) 🔨 | 1 | 1 | 0 | 0 | 2 | 0 | 0 | 1 | 5 |
| England (Brown) | 0 | 0 | 1 | 1 | 0 | 1 | 1 | 0 | 4 |

===== Draw 6 =====
| Sheet F | 1 | 2 | 3 | 4 | 5 | 6 | 7 | 8 | Final |
| England (Brown) | 1 | 0 | 0 | 1 | 0 | 0 | 2 | 0 | 4 |
| Australia (Millikin) 🔨 | 0 | 1 | 2 | 0 | 1 | 1 | 0 | 1 | 6 |

===== Draw 7 =====
| Sheet H | 1 | 2 | 3 | 4 | 5 | 6 | 7 | 8 | Final |
| Australia (Millikin) 🔨 | 0 | 0 | 2 | 1 | 1 | 0 | 3 | X | 7 |
| Japan (Sato) | 0 | 2 | 0 | 0 | 0 | 1 | 0 | X | 3 |

===== Draw 8 =====
| Sheet I | 1 | 2 | 3 | 4 | 5 | 6 | 7 | 8 | Final |
| Japan (Sato) | 0 | 1 | 0 | 2 | 1 | 1 | 1 | 1 | 7 |
| Russia (Kolesnikov) 🔨 | 4 | 0 | 1 | 0 | 0 | 0 | 0 | 0 | 5 |

| Sheet K | 1 | 2 | 3 | 4 | 5 | 6 | 7 | 8 | Final |
| United States (Pustovar) 🔨 | 0 | 1 | 0 | 1 | 1 | 2 | 3 | X | 8 |
| England (Brown) | 1 | 0 | 1 | 0 | 0 | 0 | 0 | X | 2 |

===== Draw 9 =====
| Sheet G | 1 | 2 | 3 | 4 | 5 | 6 | 7 | 8 | Final |
| England (Brown) | 0 | 2 | 0 | 0 | 1 | 0 | X | X | 3 |
| Hungary (Rokusfalvy) 🔨 | 2 | 0 | 2 | 2 | 0 | 2 | X | X | 8 |

===== Draw 10 =====
| Sheet J | 1 | 2 | 3 | 4 | 5 | 6 | 7 | 8 | Final |
| Russia (Kolesnikov) | 0 | 0 | 2 | 2 | 3 | 0 | 0 | X | 7 |
| Hungary (Rokusfalvy) 🔨 | 1 | 0 | 0 | 0 | 0 | 3 | 6 | X | 10 |

===== Draw 11 =====
| Sheet J | 1 | 2 | 3 | 4 | 5 | 6 | 7 | 8 | Final |
| United States (Pustovar) | 0 | 4 | 1 | 0 | 1 | 0 | 1 | 1 | 8 |
| Australia (Millikin) 🔨 | 2 | 0 | 0 | 2 | 0 | 1 | 0 | 0 | 5 |

===== Draw 12 =====
| Sheet F | 1 | 2 | 3 | 4 | 5 | 6 | 7 | 8 | Final |
| Russia (Kolesnikov) 🔨 | 0 | 0 | 1 | 0 | 2 | 2 | 0 | 1 | 6 |
| England (Brown) | 1 | 1 | 0 | 1 | 0 | 0 | 2 | 0 | 5 |

| Sheet G | 1 | 2 | 3 | 4 | 5 | 6 | 7 | 8 | Final |
| Japan (Sato) | 0 | 2 | 0 | 0 | 0 | 1 | 0 | X | 3 |
| United States (Pustovar) 🔨 | 1 | 0 | 1 | 2 | 0 | 0 | 3 | X | 7 |

=== Tiebreakers ===
| Sheet K | 1 | 2 | 3 | 4 | 5 | 6 | 7 | 8 | Final |
| Hungary (Rokusfalvy) | 0 | 0 | 3 | 3 | 0 | 2 | 0 | X | 8 |
| Japan (Sato) | 2 | 0 | 0 | 0 | 1 | 0 | 2 | X | 5 |

| Sheet I | 1 | 2 | 3 | 4 | 5 | 6 | 7 | 8 | Final |
| Hungary (Rokusfalvy) 🔨 | 0 | 0 | 0 | 0 | 0 | 2 | X | X | 2 |
| Australia (Millikin) | 3 | 0 | 1 | 1 | 3 | 0 | X | X | 8 |

=== Playoffs ===
Semi-final
Canada | 3
Australia | 2
United States | 8
Switzerland | 5

Final
Canada | 3
United States | 4
Bronze medal
Australia | 4
Switzerland | 3

==== Semifinals ====
Friday, April 24, 17:30

| Sheet H | 1 | 2 | 3 | 4 | 5 | 6 | 7 | 8 | Final |
| United States (Pustovar) | 0 | 1 | 0 | 2 | 2 | 0 | 3 | X | 8 |
| Switzerland (Pauli) 🔨 | 0 | 0 | 3 | 0 | 0 | 2 | 0 | X | 5 |

| Sheet J | 1 | 2 | 3 | 4 | 5 | 6 | 7 | 8 | Final |
| Australia (Millikin) | 0 | 1 | 0 | 0 | 0 | 1 | 0 | 0 | 2 |
| Canada (Delaney) 🔨 | 1 | 0 | 1 | 0 | 0 | 0 | 0 | 1 | 3 |

==== Bronze-medal game ====
Saturday, April 24, 11:30

| Sheet G | 1 | 2 | 3 | 4 | 5 | 6 | 7 | 8 | 9 | Final |
| Switzerland (Pauli) 🔨 | 0 | 1 | 0 | 0 | 0 | 1 | 1 | 0 | 0 | 3 |
| Australia (Millikin) | 1 | 0 | 1 | 0 | 0 | 0 | 0 | 1 | 1 | 4 |

==== Gold-medal game ====
Saturday, April 24, 11:30

| Sheet H | 1 | 2 | 3 | 4 | 5 | 6 | 7 | 8 | 9 | Final |
| Canada (Delaney) 🔨 | 0 | 0 | 2 | 0 | 0 | 1 | 0 | 0 | 0 | 3 |
| United States (Pustovar) | 0 | 0 | 0 | 1 | 0 | 0 | 1 | 1 | 1 | 4 |

2010 World Senior Curling Championship Men's Winner
(United States)
United States
2nd title

== Women's ==
=== Teams ===
| Country | Skip | Third | Second | Lead |
|---|---|---|---|---|
| Canada | Colleen Pinkney | Wendy Currie | Karen Hennigar | Susan Creelman |
| Italy | Susanne Carrera | Lucilla Macchiati | Caterina Colucci | Roberta Masinari |
| Japan | Naomi Kawano | Hideko Tanaka | Mieko Nakamura | Hiroko Oishi |
| New Zealand | Wendy Becker | Elizabeth Matthews | Christine Bewick | Carolyn Cooney |
| Russia | Tatyana Zaytseva | Nadezda Zyablova | Lyubov Ozerova | Larisa Pismenova |
| Sweden | Ingrid Meldahl | Ann-Catrin Kjerr | Birgitta Törn | Sylvia Liljefors |
| Switzerland | Renate Nedkoff | Lotti Pieper | Sylvia Niederer | Brigitta Keller |
| United States | Sharon Vukich | Mary Colacchio | Susan Curtis | Betty Kozai |

=== Standings ===
| Country | W | L |
|---|---|---|
| Canada | 7 | 0 |
| Switzerland | 5 | 1 |
| United States | 4 | 3 |
| Sweden | 4 | 3 |
| Japan | 3 | 4 |
| New Zealand | 2 | 5 |
| Italy | 2 | 5 |
| Russia | 1 | 6 |

=== Round-robin results ===
==== Draw 1 ====
| Sheet F | 1 | 2 | 3 | 4 | 5 | 6 | 7 | 8 | Final |
| Canada (Pinkney) | 6 | 2 | 2 | 2 | 0 | 2 | X | X | 14 |
| Italy (Carrera) 🔨 | 0 | 0 | 0 | 0 | 0 | 0 | X | X | 0 |

| Sheet G | 1 | 2 | 3 | 4 | 5 | 6 | 7 | 8 | Final |
| Sweden (Meldahl) | 0 | 2 | 0 | 0 | 4 | 2 | 0 | 1 | 9 |
| New Zealand (Becker) 🔨 | 3 | 0 | 1 | 1 | 0 | 0 | 2 | 0 | 7 |

| Sheet H | 1 | 2 | 3 | 4 | 5 | 6 | 7 | 8 | Final |
| United States (Vukich) 🔨 | 1 | 0 | 0 | 1 | 1 | 0 | 2 | 0 | 5 |
| Switzerland (Nedkoff) | 0 | 2 | 2 | 0 | 0 | 2 | 0 | 1 | 7 |

==== Draw 2 ====
| Sheet H | 1 | 2 | 3 | 4 | 5 | 6 | 7 | 8 | Final |
| Sweden (Meldahl) | 1 | 0 | 2 | 0 | 1 | 1 | 0 | X | 5 |
| Canada (Pinkney) 🔨 | 0 | 2 | 0 | 2 | 0 | 0 | 6 | X | 10 |

| Sheet I | 1 | 2 | 3 | 4 | 5 | 6 | 7 | 8 | Final |
| New Zealand (Becker) | 0 | 0 | 0 | 0 | 0 | 0 | X | X | 0 |
| Switzerland (Nedkoff) 🔨 | 1 | 1 | 3 | 3 | 2 | 2 | X | X | 12 |

| Sheet J | 1 | 2 | 3 | 4 | 5 | 6 | 7 | 8 | Final |
| Russia (Zaytseva) | 0 | 0 | 0 | 0 | 0 | 1 | 0 | X | 1 |
| Japan (Kawano) 🔨 | 2 | 1 | 1 | 2 | 3 | 0 | 6 | X | 15 |

==== Draw 3 ====
| Sheet F | 1 | 2 | 3 | 4 | 5 | 6 | 7 | 8 | Final |
| Sweden (Meldahl) | 0 | 1 | 0 | 2 | 1 | 0 | X | X | 4 |
| Japan (Kawano) 🔨 | 3 | 0 | 4 | 0 | 0 | 3 | X | X | 10 |

| Sheet I | 1 | 2 | 3 | 4 | 5 | 6 | 7 | 8 | Final |
| United States (Vukich) | 0 | 4 | 1 | 4 | 0 | 0 | 0 | X | 9 |
| Russia (Zaytseva) 🔨 | 1 | 0 | 0 | 0 | 2 | 0 | 1 | X | 4 |

| Sheet J | 1 | 2 | 3 | 4 | 5 | 6 | 7 | 8 | Final |
| Canada (Pinkney) 🔨 | 2 | 0 | 1 | 0 | 3 | 0 | 1 | 2 | 9 |
| Switzerland (Nedkoff) | 0 | 2 | 0 | 2 | 0 | 2 | 0 | 0 | 6 |

==== Draw 4 ====
| Sheet G | 1 | 2 | 3 | 4 | 5 | 6 | 7 | 8 | Final |
| Canada (Pinkney) | 0 | 0 | 2 | 0 | 3 | 1 | 1 | X | 7 |
| Japan (Kawano) 🔨 | 0 | 2 | 0 | 2 | 0 | 0 | 0 | X | 4 |

| Sheet H | 1 | 2 | 3 | 4 | 5 | 6 | 7 | 8 | Final |
| Italy (Carrera) 🔨 | 2 | 0 | 0 | 1 | 1 | 0 | 0 | 3 | 7 |
| United States (Vukich) | 0 | 1 | 2 | 0 | 0 | 2 | 1 | 0 | 6 |

| Sheet J | 1 | 2 | 3 | 4 | 5 | 6 | 7 | 8 | Final |
| Russia (Zaytseva) | 0 | 1 | 0 | 0 | 0 | 0 | X | X | 1 |
| Sweden (Meldahl) 🔨 | 2 | 0 | 1 | 3 | 1 | 4 | X | X | 11 |

==== Draw 5 ====
| Sheet F | 1 | 2 | 3 | 4 | 5 | 6 | 7 | 8 | Final |
| Italy (Carrera) | 0 | 1 | 0 | 0 | 1 | 0 | 0 | X | 2 |
| Sweden (Meldahl) 🔨 | 2 | 0 | 1 | 1 | 0 | 2 | 1 | X | 7 |

| Sheet I | 1 | 2 | 3 | 4 | 5 | 6 | 7 | 8 | Final |
| Russia (Zaytseva) 🔨 | 0 | 0 | 0 | 0 | 0 | 0 | X | X | 0 |
| Canada (Pinkney) | 3 | 2 | 1 | 4 | 3 | 1 | X | X | 14 |

| Sheet K | 1 | 2 | 3 | 4 | 5 | 6 | 7 | 8 | Final |
| New Zealand (Becker) | 1 | 0 | 0 | 0 | 0 | 3 | 0 | X | 4 |
| United States (Vukich) 🔨 | 0 | 3 | 1 | 3 | 1 | 0 | 1 | X | 9 |

==== Draw 6 ====
| Sheet F | 1 | 2 | 3 | 4 | 5 | 6 | 7 | 8 | Final |
| Switzerland (Nedkoff) | 1 | 1 | 2 | 0 | 4 | 3 | X | X | 11 |
| Russia (Zaytseva) 🔨 | 0 | 0 | 0 | 1 | 0 | 0 | X | X | 1 |

| Sheet G | 1 | 2 | 3 | 4 | 5 | 6 | 7 | 8 | 9 | Final |
| Japan (Kawano) | 0 | 0 | 0 | 0 | 1 | 1 | 0 | 2 | 0 | 4 |
| United States (Vukich) 🔨 | 0 | 1 | 1 | 1 | 0 | 0 | 1 | 0 | 2 | 6 |

| Sheet J | 1 | 2 | 3 | 4 | 5 | 6 | 7 | 8 | Final |
| Italy (Carrera) | 1 | 0 | 0 | 0 | 1 | 2 | 0 | 2 | 6 |
| New Zealand (Becker) 🔨 | 0 | 3 | 1 | 1 | 0 | 0 | 2 | 0 | 7 |

==== Draw 7 ====
| Sheet F | 1 | 2 | 3 | 4 | 5 | 6 | 7 | 8 | Final |
| United States (Vukich) | 0 | 0 | 0 | 0 | 0 | 1 | X | X | 1 |
| Canada (Pinkney) 🔨 | 4 | 2 | 2 | 2 | 1 | 0 | X | X | 11 |

| Sheet H | 1 | 2 | 3 | 4 | 5 | 6 | 7 | 8 | Final |
| Japan (Kawano) | 1 | 1 | 0 | 3 | 2 | 1 | X | X | 8 |
| New Zealand (Becker) 🔨 | 0 | 0 | 2 | 0 | 0 | 0 | X | X | 2 |

| Sheet I | 1 | 2 | 3 | 4 | 5 | 6 | 7 | 8 | Final |
| Switzerland (Nedkoff) 🔨 | 1 | 0 | 1 | 1 | 5 | 0 | X | X | 8 |
| Italy (Carrera) | 0 | 1 | 0 | 0 | 0 | 1 | X | X | 2 |

==== Draw 8 ====
| Sheet F | 1 | 2 | 3 | 4 | 5 | 6 | 7 | 8 | 9 | Final |
| Japan (Kawano) | 0 | 0 | 1 | 0 | 1 | 1 | 0 | 2 | 0 | 5 |
| Switzerland (Nedkoff) 🔨 | 1 | 0 | 0 | 2 | 0 | 0 | 2 | 0 | 3 | 8 |

==== Draw 9 ====
| Sheet F | 1 | 2 | 3 | 4 | 5 | 6 | 7 | 8 | Final |
| Canada (Pinkney) | 0 | 2 | 0 | 0 | 4 | 2 | 2 | X | 10 |
| New Zealand (Becker) 🔨 | 1 | 0 | 1 | 1 | 0 | 0 | 0 | X | 3 |

| Sheet G | 1 | 2 | 3 | 4 | 5 | 6 | 7 | 8 | 9 | Final |
| Russia (Zaytseva) 🔨 | 4 | 0 | 0 | 1 | 2 | 0 | 0 | 0 | 1 | 8 |
| Italy (Carrera) | 0 | 1 | 3 | 0 | 0 | 1 | 1 | 1 | 0 | 7 |

| Sheet I | 1 | 2 | 3 | 4 | 5 | 6 | 7 | 8 | Final |
| Sweden (Meldahl) | 0 | 1 | 0 | 1 | 0 | 2 | 0 | 0 | 4 |
| United States (Vukich) 🔨 | 1 | 0 | 2 | 0 | 1 | 0 | 2 | 3 | 9 |

==== Draw 10 ====
| Sheet F | 1 | 2 | 3 | 4 | 5 | 6 | 7 | 8 | Final |
| Switzerland (Nedkoff) | 1 | 2 | 0 | 1 | 0 | 0 | 0 | X | 4 |
| Sweden (Meldahl) 🔨 | 0 | 0 | 1 | 0 | 1 | 1 | 4 | X | 7 |

| Sheet H | 1 | 2 | 3 | 4 | 5 | 6 | 7 | 8 | Final |
| New Zealand (Becker) | 1 | 0 | 3 | 0 | 2 | 3 | 0 | 1 | 10 |
| Russia (Zaytseva) 🔨 | 0 | 2 | 0 | 4 | 0 | 0 | 2 | 0 | 8 |

| Sheet I | 1 | 2 | 3 | 4 | 5 | 6 | 7 | 8 | Final |
| Japan (Kawano) | 0 | 0 | 0 | 0 | 0 | 1 | X | X | 1 |
| Italy (Carrera) 🔨 | 4 | 1 | 1 | 3 | 1 | 0 | X | X | 10 |

=== Playoffs ===
Semi-final
Canada | 8
Sweden | 2
United States | 4
Switzerland | 6

Final
Canada | 8
Switzerland | 4
Bronze medal
Sweden | 6
United States | 5

==== Semifinals ====
Saturday, April 24, 17:30

| Sheet H | 1 | 2 | 3 | 4 | 5 | 6 | 7 | 8 | Final |
| Switzerland (Nedkoff) 🔨 | 2 | 0 | 2 | 0 | 1 | 0 | 0 | 1 | 6 |
| United States (Vukich) | 0 | 1 | 0 | 1 | 0 | 1 | 1 | 0 | 4 |

| Sheet J | 1 | 2 | 3 | 4 | 5 | 6 | 7 | 8 | Final |
| Canada (Pinkney) 🔨 | 3 | 1 | 1 | 0 | 2 | 1 | 0 | X | 8 |
| Sweden (Meldahl) | 0 | 0 | 0 | 1 | 0 | 0 | 1 | X | 2 |

==== Bronze-medal game ====
Saturday, April 24, 11:30

| Sheet G | 1 | 2 | 3 | 4 | 5 | 6 | 7 | 8 | Final |
| Sweden (Meldahl) | 0 | 2 | 1 | 0 | 2 | 0 | 0 | 1 | 6 |
| United States (Vukich) 🔨 | 1 | 0 | 0 | 1 | 0 | 2 | 1 | 0 | 5 |

==== Gold-medal game ====
Saturday, April 24, 11:30

| Sheet H | 1 | 2 | 3 | 4 | 5 | 6 | 7 | 8 | 9 | Final |
| Switzerland (Nedkoff) | 0 | 0 | 1 | 0 | 1 | 1 | 0 | 1 | 0 | 4 |
| Canada (Pinkney) 🔨 | 0 | 1 | 0 | 2 | 0 | 0 | 1 | 0 | 4 | 8 |

2010 World Senior Curling Championship Women's Winner
(Canada)
Canada
6th title
