= Lois Fowler =

Canadian curler (1955–2023)

- Curler ♀
- Born: Lois Ellen Moffatt; January 18, 1955; Carroll, Manitoba, Canada
- Died: September 28, 2023 (aged 68); Brandon, Manitoba, Canada

Curling career
- Hearts: 4 (1993, 1996, 1998, 2004)
Medal record
Curling
Representing Canada
World Senior Curling Championships
Gold medal – first place	2015 Sochi
Representing Manitoba
Scott Tournament of Hearts
Silver medal – second place	1993 Brandon

Lois Ellen Fowler (née Moffatt; January 18, 1955 – September 28, 2023) was a Canadian curler from Brandon, Manitoba.

== Early life ==
Lois Ellen Moffatt, the daughter of James and Gladys Moffatt, grew up in Carroll, Manitoba. The family moved to Brandon in 1968.

== Curling career ==
Fowler was a four-time Manitoba provincial champion, winning titles in 1993, 1996, 1998 and 2004. In 1993, she was the third on the Maureen Bonar rink. At the 1993 Scott Tournament of Hearts, Canada's national women's curling championship, the team, representing Manitoba (and playing on home ice in her hometown of Brandon), finished the round robin with an 8-3 record in second place. They won their semi-final match against Ontario, but lost in the final to Saskatchewan's Sandra Peterson (Schmirler) rink.

In 1996, Fowler was throwing lead stones for the Bonar rink. The team finished the round robin of the 1996 Scott Tournament of Hearts with a 6-5 record, in a six-way tie for fourth place. The team won their first tie breaker match against Nova Scotia, but lost in their second tiebreaker match against their fellow Manitoba rink of Connie Laliberte, who was representing Team Canada. This eliminated Manitoba from the tournament. Fowler would skip her own rink at the 1998 Scott Tournament of Hearts. She would lead her team of Betty Couling, Sharon Fowler, and Jocelyn Beever to a 4-7 record, missing the playoffs. Fowler would again skip Manitoba at the 2004 Scott Tournament of Hearts. Her team there consisted of Gerri Cooke, Bonar and Lana Hunter. There, she led Manitoba to a 7-4 round robin record, tied for fourth place with Saskatchewan's Sherry Anderson rink. The team beat Saskatchewan in the tiebreaker, but lost to Quebec's Marie-France Larouche rink in the 3 vs. 4 page playoff game.

In mixed curling, Fowler won a provincial mixed title in 1998, throwing third stones for a team skipped by her son Rob. The team went 6-5 at the 1998 Canadian Mixed Curling Championship, losing in a tiebreaker.

Upon turning 50, Fowler graduated to senior curling and won a provincial senior women's title in 2009 skipping a team which included Gwen Wooley, Lori Manning and Lynn Sandercock. Representing Manitoba, she led her team to a 9-2 record at the 2009 Canadian Senior Curling Championships, only to lose in the semifinal to British Columbia's Kathy Smiley. She won another provincial seniors title in 2013 with Wooley, Manning and new lead Joan Robertson. At the 2013 Canadian Senior Curling Championships, she led the team to a 7-4 round robin record, tied for third place. They beat Quebec in the tiebreaker but lost in the semifinal to Alberta's Deb Santos.

The next season Fowler put together a new team with far more experience, with her former skip Bonar at third, three-time Hearts champion Cathy Gauthier at second and Allyson Stewart at lead. The team went 10-1 at the 2014 Canadian Senior Curling Championships, and would beat Saskatchewan's Lorraine Arguin in the final to claim the national senior championship. This qualified the team to represent Canada at the 2015 World Senior Curling Championships. Fowler led Canada to a 4-1 record in pool play, but won all three playoff matches, including defeating Italy's Fiona Grace Simpson rink in the final to claim the gold medal. After the win, Fowler retired from competitive curling.

== Personal life and death ==
Fowler was a waitress and a banquet girl before becoming a realtor for Century 21 in 1983. She married curler Brian Fowler in 1972. Brian represented Manitoba at the 1987 Labatt Brier. Their children, Robert and Rhonda, were also curlers.

Lois Fowler was diagnosed with ovarian cancer in 2017, and died of the disease on September 28, 2023, at the age of 68.
