= Colleen Pinkney =

Canadian curler from Truro, Nova Scotia (born 1957)

- Curler
- Born: Colleen Marshall; April 20, 1957 (age 69); Truro, Nova Scotia, Canada

Team
- Curling club: Truro CC, Truro, NS

Curling career
- Member Association: Nova Scotia
- Hearts: 3 (1988, 2003, 2009)
Medal record
Women's curling
Representing Canada
World Senior Curling Championships
Gold medal – first place	2010 Chelyabinsk
Silver medal – second place	2014 Dumfries

Colleen Pinkney (born Colleen Marshall) is a Canadian curler from Truro, Nova Scotia. She is a 2009 and 2013 Canadian Senior champion skip and a two-time provincial senior champion. She won the World Senior Curling Championships in 2010.

== Career ==
In 1988, Pinkney played in her first Tournament of Hearts, playing second for Judy Burgess. The team finished 3–8. In 2003, she made her second Hearts, playing third for Nancy McConnery. That team finished with a 5–6 record. She was also the alternate for Nancy McConnery in the 2009 Scotties Tournament of Hearts.

Pinkney won the 2009 Canadian Senior Curling Championships in Summerside by defeating British Columbia's Kathy Smiley in the final. She went on to represent Canada at the 2010 World Senior Curling Championships where her rink won Gold over Switzerland to take home Canada's 6th World Senior Curling Championship title. Pinkney won her second Canadian senior title in 2013, also in Summerside, by defeating Alberta's Deb Santos in the final. At the 2014 World Senior Curling Championships, she led Canada to a silver medal after losing to Scotland's Christine Cannon in the final.
