= 1993 Scott Tournament of Hearts =

Canadian women's curling championship

- Host city: Brandon, Manitoba
- Arena: Keystone Centre
- Dates: February 27–March 6
- Attendance: 88,022
- Winner: Saskatchewan
- Curling club: Caledonian CC, Regina
- Skip: Sandra Peterson
- Third: Jan Betker
- Second: Joan McCusker
- Lead: Marcia Gudereit
- Alternate: Anita Ford
- Finalist: Manitoba (Maureen Bonar)

The 1993 Scott Tournament of Hearts, the Canadian women's national curling championship, was held from February 27 to March 6, 1993, at the Keystone Centre in Brandon, Manitoba. The total attendance for the week was a then-record 88,022, which broke the previous mark set in 1991 by over 15,000.

Team Saskatchewan, who was skipped by Sandra Peterson won the event after defeating the hometown rink Manitoba 7–6 in the final in an extra end after Peterson hit a Manitoba rock biting the rings and rolled into the house. It was Saskatchewan's first title since 1980 and ninth overall and the first of three titles skipped by Peterson (later Schmirler). The Peterson rink would go onto represent Canada in the 1993 World Women's Curling Championship held in Geneva, Switzerland, which they also won.

== Teams ==
The teams were listed as follows:

Team Canada	Alberta	British Columbia	Manitoba
Fort Rouge CC, Winnipeg Skip: Connie Laliberte; Third: Laurie Allen; Second: Cathy Gauthier; Lead: Janet Arnott; Alternate: Corrine Webb	Calgary WC, Calgary Skip: Shannon Kleibrink; Third: Sandra Jenkins; Second: Sally Shigehiro; Lead: Joanne Wright; Alternate: Glenys Bakker	Juan de Fuca CC, Victoria Skip: Julie Sutton; Third: Jodi Sutton; Second: Melissa Soligo (Note: Team British Columbia alternate Elaine Dagg-Jackson threw second stones in Draw 17.); Lead: Karri Willms; Alternate: Elaine Dagg-Jackson	Brandon CC, Brandon Skip: Maureen Bonar; Third: Lois Fowler; Second: Allyson Bell; Lead: Rhonda Fowler (Note: Team Manitoba alternate Gerri Cooke threw lead stones for the last stone of Draw 15 and all of Draw 16.); Alternate: Gerri Cooke
New Brunswick	Newfoundland	Nova Scotia	Ontario
Beaver CC, Moncton Skip: Nancy McConnery; Third: Leanne Perron; Second: Sandy Comeau; Lead: Denise Cormier; Alternate: Lynn MacKenzie	St. John's CC, St. John's Skip: Maria Thomas; Third: Cathy Cunningham; Second: Kathy Kerr; Lead: Kathy Brophy; Alternate: Laura Phillips	Halifax CC, Halifax Skip: Colleen Jones; Third: Heather Rankin; Second: Kay Zinck; Lead: Mary-Anne Arsenault; Alternate: Helen Radford	Rideau CC, Ottawa Skip: Anne Merklinger; Third: Theresa Breen; Second: Patti McKnight; Lead: Audrey Frey; Alternate: Kristin Turcotte
Prince Edward Island	Quebec	Saskatchewan	Northwest Territories/Yukon
Silver Fox CC, Summerside Skip: Angela Roberts; Third: Sara Gatchell; Second: Janice MacCullum; Lead: Nancy Reid; Alternate: Leslie Allan	Buckingham CC, Buckingham Skip: Agnes Charette; Third: Chantal Osborne; Second: France Charette; Lead: Sylvie Daniel; Alternate: Berenadette Lafrenier	Caledonian CC, Regina Skip: Sandra Peterson; Third: Jan Betker; Second: Joan McCusker; Lead: Marcia Gudereit; Alternate: Anita Ford	Yellowknife CC, Yellowknife Skip: Kelly Kaylo; Third: Sharon Cormier; Second: Wendy Ondrack; Lead: Debbie Moss; Alternate: Cheryl Burlington

== Map of teams ==
Team Canada Provincial Winners

== Round Robin standings ==
Final Round Robin standings

Key
Teams to Playoffs

Team	Skip	W	L	PF	PA	EW	EL	BE	SE	S%
Saskatchewan	Sandra Peterson	9	2	74	53	47	39	13	17	80%
Manitoba	Maureen Bonar	8	3	77	60	53	44	3	18	74%
Ontario	Anne Merklinger	7	4	67	61	49	45	5	12	80%
British Columbia	Julie Sutton	6	5	60	66	41	44	11	12	76%
Canada	Connie Laliberte	6	5	70	56	47	44	4	15	81%
Nova Scotia	Colleen Jones	6	5	71	58	44	40	3	14	78%
Alberta	Shannon Kleibrink	6	5	63	57	44	41	9	15	75%
Newfoundland	Maria Thomas	5	6	71	65	49	41	6	23	76%
Prince Edward Island	Angela Roberts	5	6	48	68	34	45	8	7	72%
Northwest Territories/Yukon	Kelly Kaylo	4	7	58	73	42	49	5	12	73%
New Brunswick	Nancy McConnery	2	9	58	78	44	49	5	12	71%
Quebec	Agnes Charette	2	9	57	79	37	49	9	8	73%

== Round Robin results ==
All draw times are in Central Standard Time (UTC-06:00).

=== Draw 1 ===
Saturday, February 27, 2:00 pm

Sheet A	1	2	3	4	5	6	7	8	9	10	11	Final
Canada (Laliberte)	0	0	1	0	1	0	0	1	0	1	0	4
Ontario (Merklinger) 🔨	1	0	0	1	0	0	1	0	1	0	1	5

Sheet B	1	2	3	4	5	6	7	8	9	10	Final
Saskatchewan (Peterson) 🔨	0	2	0	3	0	0	0	2	0	0	7
New Brunswick (McConnery)	1	0	0	0	3	0	0	0	1	1	6

Sheet C	1	2	3	4	5	6	7	8	9	10	Final
Alberta (Kleibrink) 🔨	1	0	0	0	0	1	0	0	0	X	2
British Columbia (Sutton)	0	0	1	0	3	0	0	1	2	X	7

Sheet D	1	2	3	4	5	6	7	8	9	10	Final
Prince Edward Island (Roberts) 🔨	0	0	0	0	1	0	0	2	0	X	3
Manitoba (Bonar)	1	1	1	3	0	1	1	0	2	X	10

=== Draw 2 ===
Saturday, February 27, 7:30 pm

Sheet A	1	2	3	4	5	6	7	8	9	10	Final
Manitoba (Bonar) 🔨	1	0	2	1	0	2	0	0	2	X	8
Newfoundland (Thomas)	0	1	0	0	1	0	2	2	0	X	6

Sheet B	1	2	3	4	5	6	7	8	9	10	Final
Quebec (Charette) 🔨	0	1	0	1	0	1	0	X	X	X	3
Nova Scotia (Jones)	0	0	6	0	3	0	2	X	X	X	11

Sheet C	1	2	3	4	5	6	7	8	9	10	Final
Prince Edward Island (Roberts) 🔨	1	0	2	0	1	0	1	0	1	1	7
Northwest Territories/Yukon (Kaylo)	0	1	0	1	0	3	0	0	0	0	5

Sheet D	1	2	3	4	5	6	7	8	9	10	Final
Canada (Laliberte) 🔨	2	2	0	2	1	0	3	0	X	X	10
New Brunswick (McConnery)	0	0	2	0	0	2	0	1	X	X	5

=== Draw 3 ===
Sunday, February 28, 10:00 am

Sheet B	1	2	3	4	5	6	7	8	9	10	11	Final
Alberta (Kleibrink) 🔨	0	1	0	1	2	0	0	0	0	0	0	4
Canada (Laliberte)	0	0	2	0	0	0	1	0	1	0	1	5

Sheet C	1	2	3	4	5	6	7	8	9	10	Final
Northwest Territories/Yukon (Kaylo) 🔨	2	0	1	0	0	2	0	0	0	X	5
Newfoundland (Thomas)	0	1	0	0	4	0	2	1	1	X	9

=== Draw 4 ===
Sunday, February 28, 2:00 pm

Sheet A	1	2	3	4	5	6	7	8	9	10	Final
Quebec (Charette) 🔨	0	0	1	0	0	2	0	0	1	X	4
Alberta (Kleibrink)	2	1	0	0	2	0	0	1	0	X	6

Sheet B	1	2	3	4	5	6	7	8	9	10	11	Final
New Brunswick (McConnery) 🔨	0	1	1	0	1	1	0	0	2	0	0	6
Northwest Territories/Yukon (Kaylo)	2	0	0	2	0	0	1	0	0	1	1	7

Sheet C	1	2	3	4	5	6	7	8	9	10	Final
Ontario (Merklinger) 🔨	0	1	0	1	0	1	0	0	1	0	4
Saskatchewan (Peterson)	0	0	1	0	2	0	1	1	0	0	5

Sheet D	1	2	3	4	5	6	7	8	9	10	11	Final
Nova Scotia (Jones) 🔨	1	0	0	0	0	0	0	1	0	4	0	6
British Columbia (Sutton)	0	0	0	1	1	1	1	0	2	0	1	7

=== Draw 5 ===
Sunday, February 28, 7:30 pm

Sheet A	1	2	3	4	5	6	7	8	9	10	Final
Newfoundland (Thomas) 🔨	0	0	1	0	0	0	0	X	X	X	1
Nova Scotia (Jones)	2	1	0	2	1	1	1	X	X	X	8

Sheet B	1	2	3	4	5	6	7	8	9	10	Final
British Columbia (Sutton) 🔨	0	2	0	0	1	0	2	0	2	0	7
Ontario (Merklinger)	1	0	2	0	0	2	0	1	0	2	8

Sheet C	1	2	3	4	5	6	7	8	9	10	Final
Manitoba (Bonar) 🔨	0	0	1	0	1	0	1	0	2	X	5
Quebec (Charette)	1	0	0	1	0	3	0	2	0	X	7

Sheet D	1	2	3	4	5	6	7	8	9	10	Final
Saskatchewan (Peterson) 🔨	0	1	0	1	0	2	2	0	2	X	8
Prince Edward Island (Roberts)	0	0	0	0	1	0	0	1	0	X	2

=== Draw 6 ===
Monday, March 1, 10:00 am

Sheet A	1	2	3	4	5	6	7	8	9	10	Final
British Columbia (Sutton) 🔨	0	0	1	0	1	0	0	X	X	X	2
Saskatchewan (Peterson)	0	2	0	2	0	1	3	X	X	X	8

Sheet B	1	2	3	4	5	6	7	8	9	10	Final
Manitoba (Bonar) 🔨	0	0	0	0	0	2	0	3	0	X	5
Alberta (Kleibrink)	0	2	1	2	2	0	1	0	1	X	9

Sheet C	1	2	3	4	5	6	7	8	9	10	Final
Nova Scotia (Jones) 🔨	2	0	1	0	0	0	2	2	1	X	8
Ontario (Merklinger)	0	2	0	0	1	0	0	0	0	X	3

Sheet D	1	2	3	4	5	6	7	8	9	10	Final
Prince Edward Island (Roberts) 🔨	1	0	0	0	0	0	2	0	2	X	5
Quebec (Charette)	0	0	0	0	1	1	0	0	0	X	2

=== Draw 7 ===
Monday, March 1, 2:00 pm

Sheet A	1	2	3	4	5	6	7	8	9	10	Final
Northwest Territories/Yukon (Kaylo) 🔨	2	0	0	0	0	2	0	0	2	0	6
Nova Scotia (Jones)	0	2	1	0	1	0	0	3	0	1	8

Sheet B	1	2	3	4	5	6	7	8	9	10	Final
Ontario (Merklinger) 🔨	1	1	0	1	0	0	2	0	2	X	7
Prince Edward Island (Roberts)	0	0	1	0	1	0	0	1	0	X	3

Sheet C	1	2	3	4	5	6	7	8	9	10	11	Final
Quebec (Charette) 🔨	0	1	0	2	1	0	2	0	0	0	0	6
Canada (Laliberte)	0	0	1	0	0	3	0	0	1	1	1	7

Sheet D	1	2	3	4	5	6	7	8	9	10	Final
New Brunswick (McConnery) 🔨	0	0	1	1	0	1	0	1	1	1	6
Newfoundland (Thomas)	2	2	0	0	1	0	0	0	0	0	5

=== Draw 8 ===
Monday, March 1, 7:30 pm

Sheet A	1	2	3	4	5	6	7	8	9	10	Final
Alberta (Kleibrink) 🔨	0	1	0	1	0	2	0	1	1	1	7
New Brunswick (McConnery)	0	0	1	0	1	0	1	0	0	0	3

Sheet B	1	2	3	4	5	6	7	8	9	10	Final
Newfoundland (Thomas) 🔨	0	0	0	1	1	1	4	X	X	X	7
British Columbia (Sutton)	0	0	1	0	0	0	0	X	X	X	1

Sheet C	1	2	3	4	5	6	7	8	9	10	Final
Saskatchewan (Peterson) 🔨	1	1	1	1	0	1	0	1	0	X	6
Manitoba (Bonar)	0	0	0	0	1	0	1	0	2	X	4

Sheet D	1	2	3	4	5	6	7	8	9	10	Final
Canada (Laliberte) 🔨	0	1	0	2	0	1	0	2	1	X	7
Northwest Territories/Yukon (Kaylo)	0	0	1	0	1	0	1	0	0	X	3

=== Draw 9 ===
Tuesday, March 2, 10:00 am

Sheet A	1	2	3	4	5	6	7	8	9	10	Final
British Columbia (Sutton) 🔨	0	0	2	0	2	0	2	1	0	X	7
Prince Edward Island (Roberts)	1	0	0	1	0	1	0	0	1	X	4

Sheet B	1	2	3	4	5	6	7	8	9	10	Final
Nova Scotia (Jones) 🔨	0	1	0	0	2	0	0	1	0	0	4
Saskatchewan (Peterson)	1	0	0	0	0	1	2	0	1	1	6

Sheet C	1	2	3	4	5	6	7	8	9	10	Final
Newfoundland (Thomas) 🔨	2	0	1	0	0	1	0	1	1	2	8
Ontario (Merklinger)	0	1	0	3	1	0	1	0	0	0	6

Sheet D	1	2	3	4	5	6	7	8	9	10	Final
Quebec (Charette) 🔨	1	0	0	2	0	0	2	0	0	X	5
New Brunswick (McConnery)	0	2	1	0	1	1	0	3	1	X	9

=== Draw 10 ===
Tuesday, March 2, 2:00 pm

Sheet A	1	2	3	4	5	6	7	8	9	10	Final
Northwest Territories/Yukon (Kaylo) 🔨	1	1	0	0	0	1	0	0	3	1	7
British Columbia (Sutton)	0	0	2	0	1	0	0	1	0	0	4

Sheet B	1	2	3	4	5	6	7	8	9	10	Final
Canada (Laliberte) 🔨	2	0	0	0	2	2	2	0	0	X	8
Newfoundland (Thomas)	0	1	1	1	0	0	0	1	1	X	5

Sheet C	1	2	3	4	5	6	7	8	9	10	Final
Prince Edward Island (Roberts) 🔨	0	0	0	1	0	0	0	0	1	X	2
Alberta (Kleibrink)	0	0	2	0	1	0	1	2	0	X	6

Sheet D	1	2	3	4	5	6	7	8	9	10	Final
Ontario (Merklinger) 🔨	0	1	0	1	1	0	1	0	0	X	4
Manitoba (Bonar)	2	0	1	0	0	2	0	1	2	X	8

=== Draw 11 ===
Tuesday, March 2, 7:30 pm

Sheet A	1	2	3	4	5	6	7	8	9	10	Final
Saskatchewan (Peterson) 🔨	1	0	0	1	0	2	2	0	0	0	6
Quebec (Charette)	0	2	1	0	3	0	0	1	0	1	8

Sheet B	1	2	3	4	5	6	7	8	9	10	Final
Alberta (Kleibrink) 🔨	1	1	0	0	0	1	0	1	0	X	4
Northwest Territories/Yukon (Kaylo)	0	0	0	1	1	0	2	0	2	X	6

Sheet C	1	2	3	4	5	6	7	8	9	10	Final
New Brunswick (McConnery) 🔨	1	0	0	0	0	2	0	1	0	X	4
Nova Scotia (Jones)	0	1	3	1	1	0	2	0	1	X	9

Sheet D	1	2	3	4	5	6	7	8	9	10	Final
Manitoba (Bonar) 🔨	2	0	0	1	1	0	0	1	1	1	7
Canada (Laliberte)	0	2	1	0	0	2	1	0	0	0	6

=== Draw 12 ===
Wednesday, March 3, 10:00 am

Sheet A	1	2	3	4	5	6	7	8	9	10	Final
Manitoba (Bonar) 🔨	1	0	3	0	0	1	0	0	2	X	7
New Brunswick (McConnery)	0	2	0	0	1	0	1	0	0	X	4

Sheet B	1	2	3	4	5	6	7	8	9	10	Final
Prince Edward Island (Roberts) 🔨	1	0	0	1	0	1	0	0	3	X	6
Canada (Laliberte)	0	1	1	0	1	0	1	0	0	X	4

Sheet C	1	2	3	4	5	6	7	8	9	10	Final
Quebec (Charette) 🔨	1	0	0	0	0	0	0	1	0	0	2
Northwest Territories/Yukon (Kaylo)	0	0	1	1	0	0	2	0	1	1	6

Sheet D	1	2	3	4	5	6	7	8	9	10	Final
Newfoundland (Thomas) 🔨	1	0	2	0	0	1	0	1	0	1	6
Saskatchewan (Peterson)	0	0	0	0	3	0	2	0	2	0	7

=== Draw 13 ===
Wednesday, March 3, 2:00 pm

Sheet A	1	2	3	4	5	6	7	8	9	10	Final
Ontario (Merklinger) 🔨	0	3	1	0	1	0	2	0	2	X	9
Quebec (Charette)	1	0	0	1	0	4	0	1	0	X	7

Sheet B	1	2	3	4	5	6	7	8	9	10	Final
Saskatchewan (Peterson) 🔨	1	0	0	1	1	0	0	0	1	X	4
Alberta (Kleibrink)	0	3	0	0	0	3	1	0	0	X	7

Sheet C	1	2	3	4	5	6	7	8	9	10	Final
Canada (Laliberte) 🔨	2	2	1	0	3	X	X	X	X	X	8
Nova Scotia (Jones)	0	0	0	1	0	X	X	X	X	X	1

Sheet D	1	2	3	4	5	6	7	8	9	10	Final
British Columbia (Sutton) 🔨	0	0	2	0	0	0	1	0	1	0	4
Manitoba (Bonar)	1	1	0	1	1	0	0	1	0	3	8

=== Draw 14 ===
Wednesday, March 3, 7:30 pm

Sheet A	1	2	3	4	5	6	7	8	9	10	Final
Alberta (Kleibrink) 🔨	1	0	3	0	2	0	1	0	1	2	10
Newfoundland (Thomas)	0	1	0	2	0	2	0	1	0	0	6

Sheet B	1	2	3	4	5	6	7	8	9	10	Final
Nova Scotia (Jones) 🔨	1	0	0	1	0	0	0	0	1	X	3
Prince Edward Island (Roberts)	0	3	2	0	0	0	0	3	0	X	8

Sheet C	1	2	3	4	5	6	7	8	9	10	Final
New Brunswick (McConnery) 🔨	0	0	2	0	0	1	0	1	0	X	4
British Columbia (Sutton)	1	0	0	2	1	0	1	0	1	X	6

Sheet D	1	2	3	4	5	6	7	8	9	10	Final
Northwest Territories/Yukon (Kaylo) 🔨	0	0	0	1	0	1	0	0	1	X	3
Ontario (Merklinger)	1	1	1	0	3	0	0	1	0	X	7

=== Draw 15 ===
Thursday, March 4, 10:00 am

Sheet A	1	2	3	4	5	6	7	8	9	10	Final
Canada (Laliberte) 🔨	0	2	0	1	0	0	1	0	1	0	5
British Columbia (Sutton)	1	0	1	0	2	1	0	1	0	1	7

Sheet B	1	2	3	4	5	6	7	8	9	10	Final
New Brunswick (McConnery) 🔨	1	0	2	0	0	1	0	1	1	X	6
Ontario (Merklinger)	0	1	0	2	3	0	1	0	0	X	7

Sheet C	1	2	3	4	5	6	7	8	9	10	Final
Manitoba (Bonar) 🔨	0	3	2	0	1	0	0	2	1	X	9
Northwest Territories/Yukon (Kaylo)	2	0	0	1	0	2	1	0	0	X	6

Sheet D	1	2	3	4	5	6	7	8	9	10	Final
Alberta (Kleibrink) 🔨	1	0	1	0	0	0	2	0	2	0	6
Nova Scotia (Jones)	0	3	0	1	0	1	0	1	0	2	8

=== Draw 16 ===
Thursday, March 4, 2:00 pm

Sheet A	1	2	3	4	5	6	7	8	9	10	Final
Prince Edward Island (Roberts) 🔨	4	0	1	0	1	0	1	1	0	X	8
New Brunswick (McConnery)	0	2	0	0	0	2	0	0	1	X	5

Sheet B	1	2	3	4	5	6	7	8	9	10	11	Final
Nova Scotia (Jones) 🔨	0	1	0	0	1	0	0	1	0	2	0	5
Manitoba (Bonar)	1	0	1	0	0	1	1	0	1	0	1	6

Sheet C	1	2	3	4	5	6	7	8	9	10	11	Final
Quebec (Charette) 🔨	2	0	0	0	2	2	0	0	0	0	0	6
Newfoundland (Thomas)	0	1	1	1	0	0	1	0	1	1	1	7

Sheet D	1	2	3	4	5	6	7	8	9	10	Final
Northwest Territories/Yukon (Kaylo) 🔨	1	0	0	0	0	1	1	1	0	X	4
Saskatchewan (Peterson)	0	2	3	1	1	0	0	0	3	X	10

=== Draw 17 ===
Thursday, March 4, 7:30 pm

Sheet A	1	2	3	4	5	6	7	8	9	10	Final
Saskatchewan (Peterson) 🔨	0	0	0	2	0	2	0	1	0	2	7
Canada (Laliberte)	0	1	0	0	2	0	2	0	1	0	6

Sheet B	1	2	3	4	5	6	7	8	9	10	Final
British Columbia (Sutton) 🔨	0	2	0	0	3	0	3	0	0	X	8
Quebec (Charette)	1	0	2	0	0	2	0	2	0	X	7

Sheet C	1	2	3	4	5	6	7	8	9	10	Final
Newfoundland (Thomas) 🔨	0	0	1	1	2	2	5	X	X	X	11
Prince Edward Island (Roberts)	0	0	0	0	0	0	0	X	X	X	0

Sheet D	1	2	3	4	5	6	7	8	9	10	Final
Ontario (Merklinger) 🔨	1	1	0	2	1	0	1	0	1	X	7
Alberta (Kleibrink)	0	0	1	0	0	1	0	0	0	X	2

== Playoffs ==
Semifinal			Final
			1	Saskatchewan	7
2	Manitoba	8	2	Manitoba	6
3	Ontario	4

=== Semifinal ===
Friday, March 5, 8:00 pm

Sheet C	1	2	3	4	5	6	7	8	9	10	Final
Ontario (Merklinger)	0	0	1	0	0	0	2	0	1	X	4
Manitoba (Bonar) 🔨	1	0	0	0	2	3	0	2	0	X	8

Player percentages
Ontario		Manitoba	
Audrey Frey	88%	Rhonda Fowler	61%
Patti McKnight	64%	Allyson Bell	84%
Theresa Breen	74%	Lois Fowler	75%
Anne Merklinger	61%	Maureen Bonar	74%
Total	72%	Total	74%

=== Final ===
Saturday, March 6, 1:30 pm

Sheet C	1	2	3	4	5	6	7	8	9	10	11	Final
Saskatchewan (Peterson) 🔨	2	0	0	0	0	2	1	0	1	0	1	7
Manitoba (Bonar)	0	0	1	1	1	0	0	2	0	1	0	6

Player percentages
Saskatchewan		Manitoba	
Marcia Gudereit	85%	Rhonda Fowler	93%
Joan McCusker	77%	Allyson Bell	64%
Jan Betker	85%	Lois Fowler	75%
Sandra Peterson	70%	Maureen Bonar	80%
Total	79%	Total	78%

== Statistics ==
=== Top 5 player percentages ===
Final Round Robin Percentages

Key
All-Star Team

Leads	%
(Nova Scotia) Mary-Anne Arsenault	84
(Canada) Janet Arnott	84
(Saskatchewan) Marcia Gudereit	83
(Prince Edward Island) Nancy Reid	81
(Newfoundland and Labrador) Kathy Brophy	81
(Ontario) Audrey Frey	81

Seconds	%
(Ontario) Patti McKnight	83
(Nova Scotia) Kay Zinck	81
(Alberta) Sally Shigehiro	80
(Saskatchewan) Joan McCusker	79
(Canada) Cathy Gauthier	78
(Quebec) France Charette	78

Thirds	%
(Canada) Laurie Allen	81
(Newfoundland and Labrador) Cathy Cunningham	80
(Ontario) Theresa Breen	80
(Saskatchewan) Jan Betker	78
(British Columbia) Jodie Sutton	77
(Nova Scotia) Heather Rankin	77

Skips	%
(Canada) Connie Laliberte	80
(Saskatchewan) Sandra Peterson	79
(Ontario) Anne Merklinger	78
(British Columbia) Julie Sutton	74
(Alberta) Shannon Kleibrink	74

== Awards ==
The all-star team and sportsmanship award winners were as follows:

=== All-Star Team ===
Team Saskatchewan skip Sandra Peterson became the first curler to make the all-star team in two different positions as she previously was selected to the all-star team in 1987 as a third.

Position	Name	Team
Skip	Sandra Peterson (2)	Saskatchewan
Third	Cathy Cunningham	Newfoundland
Second	Patti McKnight	Ontario
Lead	Mary-Anne Arsenault	Nova Scotia

=== Mabel Mitchell Award ===
The Scotties Tournament of Hearts Sportsmanship Award is presented to the curler who best embodies the spirit of curling at the Scotties Tournament of Hearts. The winner was selected in a vote by all players at the tournament.

Prior to 1998, the award was named after a notable individual in the curling community where the tournament was held that year. For this edition, the award was named after Mabel Mitchell, a Brandon native, who competed in three women's national championships and her team captured the 1983 Canadian Women's Senior Curling championship, the only Manitoba-based team to do so as of 2023.

Name	Team	Position
Laurie Allen	Canada	Third
