= 1991 Scott Tournament of Hearts =

Canadian women's curling championship

- Host city: Saskatoon, Saskatchewan
- Arena: Saskatchewan Place
- Dates: February 23–March 2
- Attendance: 72,245
- Winner: British Columbia
- Curling club: Juan de Fuca CC, Victoria
- Skip: Julie Sutton
- Third: Jodi Sutton
- Second: Melissa Soligo
- Lead: Karri Willms
- Alternate: Elaine Dagg-Jackson
- Finalist: New Brunswick (Heidi Hanlon)

The 1991 Scott Tournament of Hearts, the Canadian women's national curling championship, was held from February 23 to March 2, 1991, at Saskatchewan Place in Saskatoon, Saskatchewan. The total attendance was a then-record 72,245, which more than doubled the previous mark set in 1987.

Team British Columbia, who was skipped by Julie Sutton won the event after defeating New Brunswick in the final 7–5. This was BC's seventh title overall and the first of two titles won by Sutton (later Skinner), who also won as a third in 2000. This was also New Brunswick's last playoff appearance until 2022.

The Sutton rink would go onto represent Canada at the 1991 Canada Safeway World Women's Curling Championship on home soil in Winnipeg, Manitoba where they got the silver medal after losing to Norway in the final. Additionally, they also would represent Canada at the 1992 Winter Olympics held in Albertville, France since there were no Olympic Trials for the 1992 games.

The 121 blank ends in the event set a new tournament record for the most blank ends in a single tournament, which was tied the following year and to date remains a record. Yukon/Northwest Territories 7–6 victory over Prince Edward Island in the opening draw of the event was the fifth game to go into a second extra end and the third straight tournament in which this occurred.

== Teams ==
The teams were listed as follows:

Team Canada	Alberta	British Columbia	Manitoba
Bayview G&CC, Thornhill Skip: Alison Goring; Third: Kristin Turcotte; Second: Andrea Lawes; Lead: Cheryl McPherson; Alternate: Anne Merklinger	Avonair CC, Edmonton Skip: Deb Shermack; Third: Jackie-Rae Greening; Second: Diane Alexander; Lead: Leanne Usher; Alternate: Sandy Symyrozum	Juan de Fuca CC, Victoria Skip: Julie Sutton; Third: Jodi Sutton; Second: Melissa Soligo; Lead: Karri Willms; Alternate: Elaine Dagg-Jackson	Deer Lodge CC, Winnipeg Skip: Kathie Allardyce; Third: Cathy Overton; Second: Laurie Ellwood; Lead: Jill Proctor; Alternate: Kim Overton
New Brunswick	Newfoundland	Nova Scotia	Ontario
Thistle St. Andrews CC, Saint John Skip: Heidi Hanlon; Third: Kathy Floyd; Second: Sheri Stewart; Lead: Mary Harding; Alternate: Ellen Brennan	St. John's CC, St. John's Skip: Cathy Cunningham; Third: Maria Thomas; Second: Kathy O'Driscoll; Lead: Susan Wright; Alternate: Heather Martin	Halifax CC, Halifax Skip: Colleen Jones; Third: Mary Mattatall; Second: Kim Kelly; Lead: Nancy Reid; Alternate: Nancy Delahunt	Fort William CC, Thunder Bay Skip: Heather Houston; Third: Lorraine Lang; Second: Diane Adams; Lead: Diane Pushkar; Alternate: Mary Susan Bell
Prince Edward Island	Quebec	Saskatchewan	Yukon/Northwest Territories
Charlottetown CC, Charlottetown Skip: Angela Roberts; Third: Kathy O'Rourke; Second: Susan McCurdy; Lead: Bea Graham-MacDonald; Alternate: Anne Dillon	Glenmore CC, Montreal Skip: Francine Poisson (Note: Team Quebec alternate Agnes Charette threw skip stones in Draw 14.); Third: Katie Brown; Second: Cindy McHugh; Lead: Margaret Pross; Alternate: Agnes Charette	Caledonian CC, Regina Skip: Sandra Peterson; Third: Jan Betker; Second: Joan Inglis; Lead: Marcia Schiml; Alternate: Anita Ford	Whitehorse CC, Whitehorse Skip: Anna Lidgren; Third: Merna Hensley; Second: Shelley Aucoin; Lead: Rose Putland; Alternate: Margaret Lawrence

== Map of teams ==
Team Canada Provincial Winners

== Round Robin standings ==
Final Round Robin standings

Key
Teams to Playoffs
Teams to Tiebreakers

Team	Skip	W	L	PF	PA	EW	EL	BE	SE	S%
British Columbia	Julie Sutton	10	1	71	50	47	37	10	16	72%
New Brunswick	Heidi Hanlon	8	3	75	68	46	45	5	10	69%
Ontario	Heather Houston	7	4	86	56	51	36	5	20	73%
Alberta	Deb Shermack	7	4	70	50	40	38	11	10	73%
Saskatchewan	Sandra Peterson	7	4	67	48	42	32	9	13	72%
Canada	Alison Goring	6	5	63	63	40	42	9	13	73%
Nova Scotia	Colleen Jones	5	6	77	52	44	37	17	16	73%
Manitoba	Kathie Allardyce	5	6	65	65	40	47	17	9	66%
Yukon/Northwest Territories	Anna Lidgren	4	7	57	87	41	47	7	10	63%
Quebec	Francine Poisson	3	8	55	86	34	49	7	8	63%
Prince Edward Island	Angela Roberts	2	9	48	75	39	46	13	11	63%
Newfoundland	Cathy Cunningham	2	9	47	81	36	44	5	8	65%

== Round Robin results ==
All draw times are in Central Standard Time (UTC-06:00).

=== Draw 1 ===
Saturday, February 23, 1:30 pm

Sheet A	1	2	3	4	5	6	7	8	9	10	11	Final
Nova Scotia (Jones) 🔨	0	1	1	0	0	0	0	0	2	0	1	5
Manitoba (Allardyce)	0	0	0	0	1	0	0	2	0	1	0	4

Sheet B	1	2	3	4	5	6	7	8	9	10	Final
British Columbia (Sutton) 🔨	0	3	0	2	1	1	0	3	X	X	10
New Brunswick (Hanlon)	0	0	1	0	0	0	1	0	X	X	2

Sheet C	1	2	3	4	5	6	7	8	9	10	11	12	Final
Prince Edward Island (Roberts) 🔨	0	1	2	0	1	0	0	1	0	1	0	0	6
Yukon/Northwest Territories (Lidgren)	0	0	0	3	0	0	1	0	2	0	0	1	7

Sheet D	1	2	3	4	5	6	7	8	9	10	Final
Alberta (Shermack) 🔨	0	1	0	0	0	0	2	0	2	0	5
Newfoundland (Cunningham)	0	0	1	0	0	0	0	2	0	1	4

Sheet E	1	2	3	4	5	6	7	8	9	10	Final
Canada (Goring) 🔨	1	0	3	0	0	1	0	1	0	0	6
Ontario (Houston)	0	1	0	2	0	0	1	0	2	1	7

=== Draw 2 ===
Saturday, February 23, 7:00 pm

Sheet A	1	2	3	4	5	6	7	8	9	10	Final
Canada (Goring) 🔨	1	0	0	2	0	1	0	0	1	3	8
Newfoundland (Cunningham)	0	0	2	0	2	0	2	0	0	0	6

Sheet B	1	2	3	4	5	6	7	8	9	10	Final
Yukon/Northwest Territories (Lidgren) 🔨	0	1	0	0	1	1	1	0	0	X	4
Alberta (Shermack)	0	0	2	1	0	0	0	4	1	X	8

Sheet C	1	2	3	4	5	6	7	8	9	10	Final
Manitoba (Allardyce) 🔨	0	2	0	1	0	1	0	0	2	3	9
Ontario (Houston)	0	0	2	0	1	0	1	1	0	0	5

Sheet D	1	2	3	4	5	6	7	8	9	10	Final
Nova Scotia (Jones) 🔨	2	1	0	0	4	0	1	2	1	X	11
Prince Edward Island (Roberts)	0	0	2	1	0	2	0	0	0	X	5

Sheet E	1	2	3	4	5	6	7	8	9	10	Final
Saskatchewan (Peterson) 🔨	0	2	0	0	2	0	1	2	3	X	10
Quebec (Poisson)	1	0	0	1	0	3	0	0	0	X	5

=== Draw 3 ===
Sunday, February 24, 1:30 pm

Sheet A	1	2	3	4	5	6	7	8	9	10	11	Final
Alberta (Shermack) 🔨	0	2	0	0	1	0	1	0	0	1	0	5
New Brunswick (Hanlon)	0	0	1	1	0	1	0	2	0	0	2	7

Sheet B	1	2	3	4	5	6	7	8	9	10	Final
Saskatchewan (Peterson) 🔨	2	0	0	0	0	0	1	0	1	0	4
Manitoba (Allardyce)	0	0	0	1	0	0	0	2	0	2	5

Sheet C	1	2	3	4	5	6	7	8	9	10	Final
Newfoundland (Cunningham) 🔨	0	1	0	0	0	0	1	0	X	X	2
British Columbia (Sutton)	1	0	0	0	2	1	0	3	X	X	7

Sheet D	1	2	3	4	5	6	7	8	9	10	Final
Quebec (Poisson) 🔨	1	0	0	0	0	0	X	X	X	X	1
Ontario (Houston)	0	6	2	1	1	4	X	X	X	X	14

Sheet E	1	2	3	4	5	6	7	8	9	10	Final
Nova Scotia (Jones) 🔨	3	0	0	1	2	2	3	X	X	X	11
Canada (Goring)	0	0	1	0	0	0	0	X	X	X	1

=== Draw 4 ===
Sunday, February 24, 7:00 pm

Sheet A	1	2	3	4	5	6	7	8	9	10	Final
Ontario (Houston) 🔨	0	1	0	0	0	1	1	0	1	X	4
British Columbia (Sutton)	0	0	1	2	1	0	0	1	0	X	5

Sheet B	1	2	3	4	5	6	7	8	9	10	Final
Canada (Goring) 🔨	0	0	1	0	0	2	3	2	0	X	8
Prince Edward Island (Roberts)	0	1	0	1	1	0	0	0	0	X	3

Sheet C	1	2	3	4	5	6	7	8	9	10	Final
Quebec (Poisson) 🔨	1	0	0	0	0	0	X	X	X	X	1
Alberta (Shermack)	0	2	2	4	2	3	X	X	X	X	13

Sheet D	1	2	3	4	5	6	7	8	9	10	Final
Yukon/Northwest Territories (Lidgren) 🔨	0	1	0	1	0	0	3	0	1	X	6
New Brunswick (Hanlon)	0	0	2	0	1	2	0	4	0	X	9

Sheet E	1	2	3	4	5	6	7	8	9	10	Final
Newfoundland (Cunningham) 🔨	0	2	0	0	0	0	1	0	0	0	3
Saskatchewan (Peterson)	1	0	1	0	0	0	0	1	1	1	5

=== Draw 5 ===
Monday, February 25, 9:00 am

Sheet B	1	2	3	4	5	6	7	8	9	10	Final
Yukon/Northwest Territories (Lidgren) 🔨	1	1	0	0	3	0	0	3	0	1	9
Nova Scotia (Jones)	0	0	0	0	0	2	1	0	3	0	6

Sheet D	1	2	3	4	5	6	7	8	9	10	11	Final
Prince Edward Island (Roberts) 🔨	0	1	0	0	1	1	0	1	0	1	0	5
Manitoba (Allardyce)	1	0	2	1	0	0	0	0	1	0	1	6

=== Draw 6 ===
Monday, February 25, 1:30 pm

Sheet A	1	2	3	4	5	6	7	8	9	10	Final
Prince Edward Island (Roberts) 🔨	0	0	0	1	0	2	0	0	1	X	4
Alberta (Shermack)	1	0	0	0	2	0	0	4	0	X	7

Sheet B	1	2	3	4	5	6	7	8	9	10	Final
Ontario (Houston) 🔨	2	0	2	0	0	3	1	1	X	X	9
Saskatchewan (Peterson)	0	1	0	1	0	0	0	0	X	X	2

Sheet C	1	2	3	4	5	6	7	8	9	10	Final
Newfoundland (Cunningham) 🔨	1	0	1	1	0	1	0	3	1	X	8
New Brunswick (Hanlon)	0	1	0	0	3	0	2	0	0	X	6

Sheet D	1	2	3	4	5	6	7	8	9	10	Final
Canada (Goring) 🔨	2	0	0	2	1	0	0	1	1	X	7
Quebec (Poisson)	0	1	1	0	0	1	0	0	0	X	3

Sheet E	1	2	3	4	5	6	7	8	9	10	Final
Yukon/Northwest Territories (Lidgren) 🔨	0	0	0	2	0	1	1	0	1	0	5
British Columbia (Sutton)	1	1	0	0	3	0	0	0	0	1	6

=== Draw 7 ===
Monday, February 25, 7:00 pm

Sheet A	1	2	3	4	5	6	7	8	9	10	Final
New Brunswick (Hanlon) 🔨	2	0	1	0	4	0	2	0	0	2	11
Ontario (Houston)	0	1	0	1	0	3	0	2	1	0	8

Sheet B	1	2	3	4	5	6	7	8	9	10	Final
Quebec (Poisson) 🔨	2	0	0	3	3	0	1	X	X	X	9
Newfoundland (Cunningham)	0	1	0	0	0	1	0	X	X	X	2

Sheet C	1	2	3	4	5	6	7	8	9	10	Final
Canada (Goring)	0	2	0	0	1	1	0	0	1	0	5
Saskatchewan (Peterson) 🔨	3	0	1	1	0	0	0	0	0	2	7

Sheet D	1	2	3	4	5	6	7	8	9	10	Final
Manitoba (Allardyce) 🔨	0	0	0	0	1	0	1	1	0	1	4
British Columbia (Sutton)	0	0	1	0	0	3	0	0	1	0	5

Sheet E	1	2	3	4	5	6	7	8	9	10	Final
Alberta (Shermack) 🔨	0	1	0	2	0	0	1	0	0	1	5
Nova Scotia (Jones)	0	0	2	0	0	1	0	0	1	0	4

=== Draw 8 ===
Tuesday, February 26, 9:00 am

Sheet B	1	2	3	4	5	6	7	8	9	10	Final
Alberta (Shermack) 🔨	2	2	1	0	1	0	2	0	X	X	8
Canada (Goring)	0	0	0	1	0	0	0	1	X	X	2

Sheet C	1	2	3	4	5	6	7	8	9	10	Final
Ontario (Houston) 🔨	0	1	1	3	0	2	0	0	3	X	10
Newfoundland (Cunningham)	1	0	0	0	3	0	2	0	0	X	6

=== Draw 9 ===
Tuesday, February 26, 1:30 pm

Sheet A	1	2	3	4	5	6	7	8	9	10	Final
Yukon/Northwest Territories (Lidgren) 🔨	1	0	1	0	1	0	3	0	1	0	7
Quebec (Poisson)	0	1	0	2	0	0	0	2	0	1	6

Sheet B	1	2	3	4	5	6	7	8	9	10	Final
Prince Edward Island (Roberts) 🔨	1	0	0	0	2	0	0	1	1	1	6
Ontario (Houston)	0	1	0	1	0	2	1	0	0	0	5

Sheet C	1	2	3	4	5	6	7	8	9	10	Final
British Columbia (Sutton) 🔨	1	0	1	1	0	0	2	0	0	1	6
Alberta (Shermack)	0	2	0	0	1	0	0	2	0	0	5

Sheet D	1	2	3	4	5	6	7	8	9	10	11	Final
Saskatchewan (Peterson) 🔨	0	0	1	0	0	1	0	1	0	0	1	4
Nova Scotia (Jones)	0	0	0	0	1	0	1	0	0	1	0	3

Sheet E	1	2	3	4	5	6	7	8	9	10	11	Final
New Brunswick (Hanlon) 🔨	1	0	0	2	0	0	1	1	0	2	2	9
Manitoba (Allardyce)	0	0	2	0	2	1	0	0	2	0	0	7

=== Draw 10 ===
Tuesday, February 26, 7:00 pm

Sheet A	1	2	3	4	5	6	7	8	9	10	Final
British Columbia (Sutton) 🔨	0	0	1	0	0	0	0	1	0	X	2
Saskatchewan (Peterson)	1	0	0	2	1	3	0	0	1	X	8

Sheet B	1	2	3	4	5	6	7	8	9	10	Final
Manitoba (Allardyce) 🔨	4	0	1	0	0	0	0	0	0	X	5
Quebec (Poisson)	0	2	0	3	0	0	1	1	3	X	10

Sheet C	1	2	3	4	5	6	7	8	9	10	11	Final
New Brunswick (Hanlon) 🔨	2	0	4	0	0	1	0	0	1	0	1	9
Nova Scotia (Jones)	0	1	0	1	1	0	0	2	0	3	0	8

Sheet D	1	2	3	4	5	6	7	8	9	10	Final
Canada (Goring) 🔨	0	2	0	0	1	4	0	0	3	X	10
Yukon/Northwest Territories (Lidgren)	0	0	0	1	0	0	1	1	0	X	3

Sheet E	1	2	3	4	5	6	7	8	9	10	11	Final
Prince Edward Island (Roberts) 🔨	0	0	0	0	2	0	0	1	0	0	1	4
Newfoundland (Cunningham)	0	0	0	0	0	0	1	0	1	1	0	3

=== Draw 11 ===
Wednesday, February 27, 9:00 am

Sheet C	1	2	3	4	5	6	7	8	9	10	11	Final
British Columbia (Sutton) 🔨	3	0	1	0	0	0	0	1	2	0	1	9
Quebec (Poisson)	0	2	0	3	0	0	2	0	0	1	0	8

Sheet D	1	2	3	4	5	6	7	8	9	10	Final
New Brunswick (Hanlon) 🔨	0	0	1	0	0	1	0	0	0	4	6
Saskatchewan (Peterson)	0	0	0	0	1	0	2	0	0	0	3

=== Draw 12 ===
Wednesday, February 27, 1:30 pm

Sheet A	1	2	3	4	5	6	7	8	9	10	Final
Manitoba (Allardyce) 🔨	0	0	0	0	2	0	0	0	1	X	3
Canada (Goring)	1	0	2	0	0	2	1	1	0	X	7

Sheet B	1	2	3	4	5	6	7	8	9	10	Final
Newfoundland (Cunningham) 🔨	1	0	0	0	1	0	0	X	X	X	2
Nova Scotia (Jones)	0	4	5	1	0	0	4	X	X	X	14

Sheet C	1	2	3	4	5	6	7	8	9	10	Final
Alberta (Shermack) 🔨	2	0	0	2	0	0	1	0	2	X	7
Saskatchewan (Peterson)	0	1	0	0	1	0	0	2	0	X	4

Sheet D	1	2	3	4	5	6	7	8	9	10	Final
Prince Edward Island (Roberts) 🔨	1	0	1	0	0	2	0	0	0	X	4
Quebec (Poisson)	0	2	0	2	1	0	0	1	0	X	6

Sheet E	1	2	3	4	5	6	7	8	9	10	Final
Ontario (Houston) 🔨	3	2	2	0	4	2	X	X	X	X	13
Yukon/Northwest Territories (Lidgren) 🔨	0	0	0	1	0	0	X	X	X	X	1

=== Draw 13 ===
Wednesday, February 27, 7:00 pm

Sheet A	1	2	3	4	5	6	7	8	9	10	Final
Newfoundland (Cunningham) 🔨	1	0	1	0	0	0	1	0	1	0	4
Yukon/Northwest Territories (Lidgren)	0	2	0	2	1	1	0	0	0	1	7

Sheet B	1	2	3	4	5	6	7	8	9	10	Final
New Brunswick (Hanlon) 🔨	2	0	1	0	2	0	1	0	0	X	6
Prince Edward Island (Roberts)	0	1	0	0	0	0	0	1	2	X	4

Sheet C	1	2	3	4	5	6	7	8	9	10	Final
Nova Scotia (Jones) 🔨	2	1	0	0	0	0	1	0	0	0	4
Ontario (Houston)	0	0	2	1	0	0	0	0	1	1	5

Sheet D	1	2	3	4	5	6	7	8	9	10	Final
Canada (Goring)	0	0	0	0	3	0	0	1	0	X	4
British Columbia (Sutton) 🔨	0	1	0	3	0	1	1	0	2	X	8

Sheet E	1	2	3	4	5	6	7	8	9	10	Final
Manitoba (Allardyce) 🔨	0	2	0	0	1	2	0	3	X	X	8
Alberta (Shermack)	0	0	1	0	0	0	1	0	X	X	2

=== Draw 14 ===
Thursday, February 28, 1:30 pm

Sheet A	1	2	3	4	5	6	7	8	9	10	Final
Quebec (Poisson) 🔨	0	0	1	0	0	1	0	0	0	X	2
Nova Scotia (Jones)	1	1	0	1	3	0	2	0	1	X	9

Sheet B	1	2	3	4	5	6	7	8	9	10	Final
Saskatchewan (Peterson) 🔨	2	0	2	2	0	3	2	X	X	X	11
Yukon/Northwest Territories (Lidgren)	0	1	0	0	1	0	0	X	X	X	2

Sheet C	1	2	3	4	5	6	7	8	9	10	Final
Canada (Goring) 🔨	0	1	0	2	0	1	1	0	0	0	5
New Brunswick (Hanlon)	0	0	1	0	1	0	0	0	1	1	4

Sheet D	1	2	3	4	5	6	7	8	9	10	Final
Newfoundland (Cunningham) 🔨	1	1	0	0	0	2	1	1	0	1	7
Manitoba (Allardyce)	0	0	0	3	1	0	0	0	2	0	6

Sheet E	1	2	3	4	5	6	7	8	9	10	Final
British Columbia (Sutton) 🔨	0	1	0	0	1	0	2	0	2	1	7
Prince Edward Island (Roberts)	1	0	1	1	0	1	0	2	0	0	6

=== Draw 15 ===
Thursday, February 28, 7:00 pm

Sheet A	1	2	3	4	5	6	7	8	9	10	Final
Saskatchewan (Peterson) 🔨	0	0	2	0	0	1	1	5	X	X	9
Prince Edward Island (Roberts)	0	0	0	0	1	0	0	0	X	X	1

Sheet B	1	2	3	4	5	6	7	8	9	10	Final
Nova Scotia (Jones) 🔨	0	0	0	0	0	1	0	1	0	0	2
British Columbia (Sutton)	0	0	0	0	1	0	1	0	1	3	6

Sheet C	1	2	3	4	5	6	7	8	9	10	Final
Yukon/Northwest Territories (Lidgren) 🔨	1	0	2	0	0	0	1	0	2	0	6
Manitoba (Allardyce)	0	1	0	0	1	1	0	3	0	2	8

Sheet D	1	2	3	4	5	6	7	8	9	10	Final
Ontario (Houston) 🔨	1	0	2	0	0	1	0	0	1	1	6
Alberta (Shermack)	0	1	0	0	2	0	2	0	0	0	5

Sheet E	1	2	3	4	5	6	7	8	9	10	Final
Quebec (Poisson) 🔨	1	1	0	2	0	0	0	0	0	0	4
New Brunswick (Hanlon)	0	0	1	0	2	1	1	0	0	1	6

== Tiebreakers ==
			To Semifinal
			1	Ontario	6
2	Alberta	3		Saskatchewan	3
3	Saskatchewan	6

=== Round 1 ===
Friday, March 1, 9:00 am

Sheet C	1	2	3	4	5	6	7	8	9	10	Final
Alberta (Shermack) 🔨	0	0	0	1	0	0	0	1	1	X	3
Saskatchewan (Peterson)	0	0	1	0	2	2	1	0	0	X	6

Player percentages
Alberta		Saskatchewan	
Leanne Usher	94%	Marcia Schiml	89%
Diane Alexander	85%	Joan Inglis	70%
Jackie-Rae Greening	74%	Jan Betker	81%
Deb Shermack	68%	Sandra Peterson	82%
Total	80%	Total	80%

=== Round 2 ===
Friday, March 1, 1:30 pm

Sheet A	1	2	3	4	5	6	7	8	9	10	Final
Ontario (Houston) 🔨	0	0	1	0	1	0	1	0	3	X	6
Saskatchewan (Peterson)	0	0	0	1	0	1	0	1	0	X	3

Player percentages
Ontario		Saskatchewan	
Diane Pushkar	68%	Marcia Schiml	90%
Diane Adams	75%	Joan Inglis	70%
Lorraine Lang	68%	Jan Betker	73%
Heather Houston	74%	Sandra Peterson	76%
Total	71%	Total	77%

== Playoffs ==
Semifinal			Final
			1	British Columbia	7
2	New Brunswick	9	2	New Brunswick	5
3	Ontario	7

=== Semifinal ===
Friday, March 1, 7:00 pm

Sheet C	1	2	3	4	5	6	7	8	9	10	11	Final
New Brunswick (Hanlon) 🔨	0	0	1	0	2	0	0	3	1	0	2	9
Ontario (Houston)	1	1	0	1	0	0	2	0	0	2	0	7

Player percentages
New Brunswick		Ontario	
Mary Harding	77%	Diane Pushkar	73%
Sheri Stewart	75%	Diane Adams	81%
Kathy Floyd	66%	Lorraine Lang	67%
Heidi Hanlon	61%	Heather Houston	68%
Total	70%	Total	72%

=== Final ===
Saturday, March 2, 1:30 pm

Sheet C	1	2	3	4	5	6	7	8	9	10	Final
British Columbia (Sutton) 🔨	1	0	0	0	1	0	0	2	2	1	7
New Brunswick (Hanlon)	0	0	1	1	0	1	2	0	0	0	5

Player percentages
British Columbia		New Brunswick	
Karri Willms	82%	Mary Harding	71%
Melissa Soligo	76%	Sheri Stewart	85%
Jodie Sutton	63%	Kathy Floyd	66%
Julie Sutton	73%	Heidi Hanlon	64%
Total	72%	Total	72%

== Statistics ==
=== Top 5 player percentages ===
Final Round Robin Percentages

Key
All-Star Team

Leads	%
(Canada) Cheryl McPherson	79
(Alberta) Leanne Usher	77
(Saskatchewan) Marcia Schiml	75
(Ontario) Diane Pushkar	73
(Manitoba) Jill Proctor	72
(Quebec) Margaret Pross	72

Seconds	%
(New Brunswick) Sheri Stewart	77
(Nova Scotia) Kim Kelly	76
(Canada) Andrea Lawes	76
(Ontario) Diane Adams	75
(British Columbia) Melissa Soligo	72

Thirds	%
(Alberta) Jackie-Rae Greening	78
(Ontario) Lorraine Lang	73
(Nova Scotia) Mary Mattatall	72
(Saskatchewan) Jan Betker	72
(Canada) Kristin Turcotte	71
(New Brunswick) Kathy Floyd	71
(British Columbia) Jodie Sutton	71

Skips	%
(British Columbia) Julie Sutton	75
(Saskatchewan) Sandra Peterson	71
(Nova Scotia) Colleen Jones	71
(Ontario) Heather Houston	70
(Alberta) Deb Shermack	69

== Awards ==
The all-star team and sportsmanship award winners were as follows:

=== All-Star Team ===
Position	Name	Team
Skip	Julie Sutton	British Columbia
Third	Jackie-Rae Greening (2)	Alberta
Second	Sheri Stewart	New Brunswick
Lead	Cheryl McPherson	Canada

=== Vera Pezer Award ===
The Scotties Tournament of Hearts Sportsmanship Award is presented to the curler who best embodies the spirit of curling at the Scotties Tournament of Hearts. The winner was selected in a vote by all players at the tournament.

Prior to 1998, the award was named after a notable individual in the curling community where the tournament was held that year. For this edition, the award was named after Vera Pezer, who is considered to be one of the most accomplished women's curlers of all time. Pezer skipped a then-record four women's championships, including three straight from 1971 to 1973, which was a record at the time as well.

Name	Team	Position
Alison Goring	Canada	Skip
