= Kristin Turcotte =

Canadian female curler and coach

- Curler
- Born: Kristin Holman

Team
- Curling club: Bayview G&CC, Thornhill, ON, Rideau CC, Ottawa, Brantford G&CC, Brantford
- Skip: Susan Froud
- Third: Kerry Lackie
- Second: Kristin Turcotte
- Lead: Julie McMullin

Curling career
- Member Association: Ontario
- Hearts: 4 (1990, 1991, 1993, 1994)
- World Championship: 1 (1990)
- Other appearances: World Senior Curling Championships: 1 (2024)
- Top CTRS ranking: 52nd (2023–24)
Medal record
Women's curling
Representing Canada
World Championships
Bronze medal – third place	1990 Västerås
World Senior Curling Championships
Gold medal – first place	2024 Östersund
Representing Ontario
Scotties Tournament of Hearts
Gold medal – first place	1990 Ottawa

Kristin Turcotte, née Holman (born c. 1965) is a Canadian curler from Ajax, Ontario.

She is a 1990 World women's bronze medallist and 1990 Canadian women's champion.

Turcotte won the 2023 Canadian Senior Curling Championships, representing Ontario, on a team skipped by Susan Froud.

She was inducted into the Toronto Curling Hall of Fame in 1992.

Turcotte won the 2026 Canadian Masters curling championship, representing Ontario on a team skipped by Mary Chilvers.

She is the first Canadian curler to win Canadian Junior, Scotties, senior and Masters Championships

== Personal life ==
Turcotte is married to fellow curler Bob Turcotte. She worked as a nurse in surgical intensive care at the Toronto East General Hospital. , Ajax ICU and Centenary PACU. She retired from Nursing in 2026.

== Teams and events ==
=== Women's ===
Season	Skip	Third	Second	Lead	Alternate	Events
1981–82	Alison Goring	Kristin Holman	Cheryl McPherson	Lynda Armstrong		CJCC 1982 (silver)
1982–83	Alison Goring	Kristin Holman	Cheryl McPherson	Lynda Armstrong		CJCC 1983 (gold)
1983–84	Kristin Holman	Kathleen McCulloch	Carol Berringer	Lynette Greenwood		CJCC 1984 (silver)
1989–90	Alison Goring	Kristin Turcotte	Andrea Lawes	Cheryl McPherson	Anne Merklinger	STOH 1990 (gold); WCC 1990 (bronze)
1990–91	Alison Goring	Kristin Turcotte	Andrea Lawes	Cheryl McPherson	Anne Merklinger	STOH 1991 (6th)
1992–93	Anne Merklinger	Theresa Breen	Patti McKnight	Audrey Frey	Kristin Turcotte	STOH 1993 (6th)
1993–94	Anne Merklinger	Theresa Breen	Patti McKnight	Audrey Frey	Kristin Turcotte	STOH 1994 (11th)
1993–94	Pam Leavitt	Kristin Turcotte	Cheryl McPherson	Andrea Lawes		
1994–95	Kristin Turcotte	Kathy Brown	Janet Demerse	Kerri Jobe		
2015–16	Jo-Ann Rizzo	Kerry Lackie	Kristin Turcotte	Julie McMullin		CSCC 2016 (4th)
2016–17	Jo-Ann Rizzo	Kerry Lackie	Kristin Turcotte	Julie McMullin		CSCC 2017 (silver)
2017–18	Jo-Ann Rizzo	Kerry Lackie	Kristin Turcotte	Julie McMullin		
2018–19	Jo-Ann Rizzo	Kerry Lackie	Kristin Turcotte	Julie McMullin		
2019–20	Colleen Madonia	Kerry Lackie	Kristin Turcotte	Peggy Barrette		
2023–24	Susan Froud	Kerry Lackie	Kristin Turcotte	Julie McMullin		CSCC 2023 (gold)

=== Mixed ===
Season	Skip	Third	Second	Lead	Events
1986–87	Scott McPherson	Cheryl McPherson	Stu Garner	Kristin Holman	
1989–90	Bob Turcotte	Kristin Turcotte	Dick Howson	Andrea Lawes	
1991–92	Bob Turcotte	Kristin Turcotte	Dick Howson	Mary Bowman	
1998–99	Bob Turcotte	Kristin Turcotte	Roy Weigand	Andrea Lawes	CMxCC 1999 (bronze)
2007–08	Bob Turcotte	Kristin Turcotte	Roy Weigand	Andrea Lawes	CMxCC 2008 (silver)
