= 1992 Scott Tournament of Hearts =

Canadian women's curling championship

- Host city: Halifax, Nova Scotia
- Arena: Halifax Metro Centre
- Dates: February 29–March 7
- Attendance: 42,093
- Winner: Manitoba
- Curling club: Fort Rouge CC, Winnipeg
- Skip: Connie Laliberte
- Third: Laurie Allen
- Second: Cathy Gauthier
- Lead: Janet Arnott
- Alternate: Arlene MacLeod
- Finalist: Canada (Julie Sutton)

The 1992 Scott Tournament of Hearts, the Canadian women's national curling championship, was held from February 29 to March 7, 1992, at the Halifax Metro Centre in Halifax, Nova Scotia. The total attendance for the week was 42,093.

Team Manitoba, who was skipped by Connie Laliberte won the event as they beat defending champion Julie Sutton and Team Canada 7–3 in the final after nine ends. Manitoba reached the final after beating British Columbia in the semifinal 7–6. This was Manitoba's fourth title overall and the second of three skipped by Laliberte, who also skipped Manitoba's last title in 1984. The eight years between titles for Laliberte along with lead Janet Arnott tied Joyce McKee's then-record for the longest period between title wins.

Laliberte's rink would go onto represent Canada at the 1992 Canada Safeway World Women's Curling Championship held in Garmisch-Partenkirchen, Germany where they lost in the semifinal to eventual champion Sweden.

The 121 blank ends during the event tied the record set the previous year for the most blank ends during a single tournament. As of 2023, this record still stands. Additionally, the final saw the following final game records either tied or set:

- The three points scored by Team Canada tied a record for the fewest points by one team in a final, matching Team Canada in 1986 and Manitoba in 1987.
- Manitoba set or tied the following steal records for a final game:
  - Most stolen ends in a final game (4)
  - Most points from stolen ends in a final game (5, tied record set by Team Canada in 1986)
  - Most consecutive stolen ends in a final game (3, beginning in the sixth end)
- This was also the last final until 2023 to be conceded without any rocks being thrown in the tenth end

== Teams ==
The teams were listed as follows:

Team Canada	Alberta	British Columbia	Manitoba
Juan de Fuca CC, Victoria Skip: Julie Sutton; Third: Jodi Sutton; Second: Melissa Soligo; Lead: Karri Willms; Alternate: Elaine Dagg-Jackson	Calgary Ladies S.L., Calgary Skip: Cheryl Bernard; Third: Allison Earl; Second: Barb Davies; Lead: Bev Kellerman; Alternate: Judy Pendergast	Richmond CC, Richmond Skip: Lisa Walker; Third: Kelley Owen; Second: Cindy McArdie; Lead: Cathy Sauer; Alternate: Lindsay Sparkes	Fort Rouge CC, Winnipeg Skip: Connie Laliberte; Third: Laurie Allen; Second: Cathy Gauthier; Lead: Janet Arnott; Alternate: Arlene MacLeod
New Brunswick	Newfoundland	Nova Scotia	Ontario
Thistle St. Andrews CC, Saint John Skip: Heidi Hanlon; Third: Kathy Floyd; Second: Sheri Stewart; Lead: Judy Blanchard; Alternate: Mary Harding	Carol CC, Labrador City Skip: Sue Anne Bartlett; Third: Marcie Brown; Second: Helen Nichols (Note: Team Newfoundland alternate Debbie Porter threw second stones for Draws 2–6 and 9.); Lead: Cathy Combden; Alternate: Debbie Porter	Halifax CC, Halifax Skip: Colleen Jones; Third: Mary Mattatall; Second: Kim Kelly; Lead: Sue Green; Alternate: Tara Phillips	Port Arthur CC, Thunder Bay Skip: Kim Clark; Third: Tracy Kennedy; Second: Patty Wilson; Lead: Peggy Barrette; Alternate: Marlene Inglis
Prince Edward Island	Quebec	Saskatchewan	Yukon/Northwest Territories
Charlottetown CC, Charlottetown Skip: Kim Dolan; Third: Susan McInnis; Second: Julie Scales; Lead: Marion MacAulay; Alternate: Cathy Dillon	Buckinham CC, Buckingham Skip: Agnes Charette; Third: Chantal Osborne; Second: France Charette; Lead: Sylvie Daniel; Alternate: Sylvie Girard	Tartan CC, Regina Skip: Michelle Schneider; Third: Kathy Fahlman; Second: Joan Stricker; Lead: Lorie Kehler; Alternate: Kendra Richard	Whitehorse CC, Whitehorse Skip: Dawn Moses; Third: Debbie Stokes; Second: Lisa Leblanc; Lead: Loralee Laberge; Alternate: Rhonda Horte

== Map of teams ==
Team Canada Provincial Winners

== Round Robin standings ==
Final Round Robin standings

Key
Teams to Playoffs

Team	Skip	W	L	PF	PA	EW	EL	BE	SE	S%
British Columbia	Lisa Walker	9	2	71	47	47	36	12	15	70%
Canada	Julie Sutton	9	2	67	55	50	38	10	17	74%
Manitoba	Connie Laliberte	9	2	65	40	46	29	12	20	75%
Saskatchewan	Michelle Schneider	7	4	70	53	46	40	8	15	75%
Quebec	Agnes Charette	6	5	66	58	47	40	10	14	69%
Nova Scotia	Colleen Jones	6	5	60	48	39	37	13	9	75%
Prince Edward Island	Kim Dolan	4	7	49	63	37	47	10	3	68%
Ontario	Kim Clark	4	7	61	71	41	47	9	10	67%
Alberta	Cheryl Bernard	4	7	51	66	34	47	13	2	70%
Yukon/Northwest Territories	Dawn Moses	4	7	50	63	36	46	8	9	66%
New Brunswick	Heidi Hanlon	3	8	57	73	39	48	6	6	68%
Newfoundland	Sue Anne Bartlett	1	10	55	85	41	48	9	8	65%

== Round Robin results ==
All draw times are in Atlantic Standard Time (UTC-04:00).

=== Draw 1 ===
Saturday, February 29, 3:00 pm

Sheet A	1	2	3	4	5	6	7	8	9	10	Final
Canada (Sutton) 🔨	1	0	0	1	0	0	1	0	0	X	3
Alberta (Bernard)	0	2	0	0	1	0	0	2	2	X	7

Sheet B	1	2	3	4	5	6	7	8	9	10	Final
Prince Edward Island (Dolan) 🔨	1	0	1	0	0	2	0	0	0	X	4
Quebec (Charette)	0	1	0	0	1	0	4	1	2	X	9

Sheet C	1	2	3	4	5	6	7	8	9	10	Final
Yukon/Northwest Territories (Moses) 🔨	2	0	0	1	0	0	1	1	3	X	8
Manitoba (Laliberte)	0	0	1	0	0	2	0	0	0	X	3

Sheet D	1	2	3	4	5	6	7	8	9	10	Final
Nova Scotia (Jones) 🔨	0	0	0	1	0	2	0	3	0	X	6
New Brunswick (Hanlon)	0	0	0	0	1	0	2	0	1	X	4

=== Draw 2 ===
Saturday, February 29, 7:30 pm

Sheet A	1	2	3	4	5	6	7	8	9	10	11	Final
Ontario (Clark) 🔨	0	3	0	0	1	0	0	0	0	1	0	5
Newfoundland (Bartlett)	1	0	1	1	0	0	1	1	0	0	2	7

Sheet B	1	2	3	4	5	6	7	8	9	10	Final
British Columbia (Walker) 🔨	0	1	0	1	1	0	2	0	1	1	7
Canada (Sutton)	0	0	1	0	0	2	0	1	0	0	4

Sheet C	1	2	3	4	5	6	7	8	9	10	11	Final
Saskatchewan (Schneider) 🔨	0	0	2	0	0	0	1	0	0	0	4	7
Nova Scotia (Jones)	0	0	0	1	0	0	0	0	1	1	0	3

Sheet D	1	2	3	4	5	6	7	8	9	10	Final
Alberta (Bernard) 🔨	0	0	0	1	0	1	0	1	0	0	3
Prince Edward Island (Dolan)	0	1	0	0	1	0	1	0	0	1	4

=== Draw 3 ===
Sunday, March 1, 10:30 am

Sheet B	1	2	3	4	5	6	7	8	9	10	11	Final
Yukon/Northwest Territories (Moses) 🔨	1	0	0	0	1	1	0	1	0	2	0	6
Alberta (Bernard)	0	0	0	2	0	0	2	0	2	0	1	7

Sheet C	1	2	3	4	5	6	7	8	9	10	Final
Ontario (Clark) 🔨	0	0	1	0	0	2	1	0	X	X	4
Quebec (Charette)	1	2	0	3	3	0	0	1	X	X	10

=== Draw 4 ===
Sunday, March 1, 3:00 pm

Sheet A	1	2	3	4	5	6	7	8	9	10	Final
Prince Edward Island (Dolan) 🔨	0	0	0	0	1	0	1	0	1	X	3
Manitoba (Laliberte)	1	0	0	1	0	2	0	1	0	X	5

Sheet B	1	2	3	4	5	6	7	8	9	10	Final
British Columbia (Walker) 🔨	0	0	0	1	0	0	0	1	0	X	2
Nova Scotia (Jones)	0	0	0	0	0	2	1	0	2	X	5

Sheet C	1	2	3	4	5	6	7	8	9	10	Final
Saskatchewan (Schneider) 🔨	1	0	0	1	0	1	0	3	0	X	6
Newfoundland (Bartlett)	0	0	1	0	0	0	1	0	2	X	4

Sheet D	1	2	3	4	5	6	7	8	9	10	Final
New Brunswick (Hanlon) 🔨	0	1	1	0	3	0	1	0	0	X	6
Yukon/Northwest Territories (Moses)	1	0	0	1	0	0	0	1	0	X	3

=== Draw 5 ===
Sunday, March 1, 7:30 pm

Sheet A	1	2	3	4	5	6	7	8	9	10	Final
New Brunswick (Hanlon) 🔨	0	2	0	0	2	0	0	2	0	X	6
Canada (Sutton)	1	0	2	2	0	1	1	0	0	X	7

Sheet B	1	2	3	4	5	6	7	8	9	10	Final
Quebec (Charette) 🔨	2	1	0	1	0	1	0	0	1	0	6
Saskatchewan (Schneider)	0	0	1	0	1	0	2	1	0	3	8

Sheet C	1	2	3	4	5	6	7	8	9	10	Final
Manitoba (Laliberte) 🔨	1	1	0	0	0	0	1	1	0	2	6
Ontario (Clark)	0	0	1	0	1	0	0	0	2	0	4

Sheet D	1	2	3	4	5	6	7	8	9	10	Final
Newfoundland (Bartlett) 🔨	0	0	0	1	0	0	2	0	0	X	3
British Columbia (Walker)	1	0	1	0	2	1	0	0	3	X	8

=== Draw 6 ===
Monday, March 2, 10:30 am

Sheet A	1	2	3	4	5	6	7	8	9	10	Final
Newfoundland (Bartlett) 🔨	1	0	2	0	2	0	0	1	0	X	6
New Brunswick (Hanlon)	0	3	0	2	0	1	1	0	6	X	13

Sheet B	1	2	3	4	5	6	7	8	9	10	Final
Quebec (Charette) 🔨	0	0	1	0	1	0	0	1	0	X	3
British Columbia (Walker)	0	1	0	2	0	0	2	0	1	X	6

Sheet C	1	2	3	4	5	6	7	8	9	10	Final
Nova Scotia (Jones) 🔨	0	0	2	0	1	0	0	1	3	X	7
Alberta (Bernard)	0	0	0	2	0	0	0	0	0	X	2

Sheet D	1	2	3	4	5	6	7	8	9	10	Final
Saskatchewan (Schneider) 🔨	0	1	0	0	1	0	1	0	0	X	3
Canada (Sutton)	0	0	1	0	0	2	0	0	2	X	5

=== Draw 7 ===
Monday, March 2, 3:00 pm

Sheet A	1	2	3	4	5	6	7	8	9	10	Final
Manitoba (Laliberte) 🔨	1	1	1	0	1	0	1	1	2	X	8
Saskatchewan (Schneider)	0	0	0	1	0	1	0	0	0	X	2

Sheet B	1	2	3	4	5	6	7	8	9	10	Final
Alberta (Bernard) 🔨	1	0	0	2	0	3	0	0	2	0	8
Ontario (Clark)	0	2	2	0	1	0	2	0	0	2	9

Sheet C	1	2	3	4	5	6	7	8	9	10	Final
New Brunswick (Hanlon) 🔨	0	0	1	0	1	0	1	0	1	X	4
Prince Edward Island (Dolan)	0	0	0	2	0	2	0	1	0	X	5

Sheet D	1	2	3	4	5	6	7	8	9	10	Final
Yukon/Northwest Territories (Moses) 🔨	0	0	2	1	0	2	0	0	0	X	5
Quebec (Charette)	0	1	0	0	1	0	0	1	0	X	3

=== Draw 8 ===
Monday, March 2, 7:30 pm

Sheet A	1	2	3	4	5	6	7	8	9	10	Final
British Columbia (Walker) 🔨	0	1	0	1	1	1	0	1	0	1	6
Yukon/Northwest Territories (Moses)	1	0	1	0	0	0	1	0	1	0	4

Sheet B	1	2	3	4	5	6	7	8	9	10	Final
Prince Edward Island (Dolan) 🔨	1	0	4	0	0	1	0	1	0	X	7
Newfoundland (Bartlett)	0	1	0	1	0	0	1	0	2	X	5

Sheet C	1	2	3	4	5	6	7	8	9	10	Final
Canada (Sutton) 🔨	0	0	0	1	0	0	1	0	2	1	5
Manitoba (Laliberte)	0	0	0	0	0	2	0	0	0	0	2

Sheet D	1	2	3	4	5	6	7	8	9	10	11	Final
Ontario (Clark) 🔨	0	1	0	0	1	0	1	0	1	0	1	5
Nova Scotia (Jones)	0	0	1	0	0	0	0	2	0	1	0	4

=== Draw 9 ===
Tuesday, March 3, 10:30 am

Sheet A	1	2	3	4	5	6	7	8	9	10	Final
New Brunswick (Hanlon) 🔨	1	1	0	0	0	0	1	0	0	X	3
Ontario (Clark)	0	0	1	2	1	2	0	1	2	X	9

Sheet B	1	2	3	4	5	6	7	8	9	10	Final
Prince Edward Island (Dolan) 🔨	1	0	0	0	0	1	0	1	0	X	3
Nova Scotia (Jones)	0	1	1	1	0	0	2	0	2	X	7

Sheet C	1	2	3	4	5	6	7	8	9	10	Final
Manitoba (Laliberte) 🔨	0	0	0	1	0	1	1	0	1	1	5
British Columbia (Walker)	0	0	0	0	1	0	0	1	0	0	2

Sheet D	1	2	3	4	5	6	7	8	9	10	Final
Yukon/Northwest Territories (Moses) 🔨	0	0	2	0	4	0	0	0	3	1	10
Newfoundland (Bartlett)	0	2	0	1	0	3	1	1	0	0	8

=== Draw 10 ===
Tuesday, March 3, 3:00 pm

Sheet A	1	2	3	4	5	6	7	8	9	10	Final
British Columbia (Walker) 🔨	0	1	2	0	0	1	0	3	0	X	7
Prince Edward Island (Dolan)	0	0	0	1	0	0	2	0	2	X	5

Sheet B	1	2	3	4	5	6	7	8	9	10	Final
Saskatchewan (Schneider) 🔨	2	0	1	4	1	0	1	X	X	X	9
Yukon/Northwest Territories (Moses)	0	1	0	0	0	1	0	X	X	X	2

Sheet C	1	2	3	4	5	6	7	8	9	10	Final
Newfoundland (Bartlett) 🔨	0	0	2	0	1	0	1	0	3	0	7
Alberta (Bernard)	1	0	0	1	0	2	0	2	0	2	8

Sheet D	1	2	3	4	5	6	7	8	9	10	Final
Canada (Sutton) 🔨	1	0	0	3	0	0	0	0	0	2	6
Quebec (Charette)	0	0	2	0	1	1	0	0	1	0	5

=== Draw 11 ===
Tuesday, March 3, 7:30 pm

Sheet A	1	2	3	4	5	6	7	8	9	10	Final
Alberta (Bernard) 🔨	0	0	1	0	0	0	1	0	X	X	2
Saskatchewan (Schneider)	1	1	0	2	3	1	0	1	X	X	9

Sheet B	1	2	3	4	5	6	7	8	9	10	Final
Ontario (Clark) 🔨	1	0	2	0	0	3	0	1	0	1	8
Canada (Sutton)	0	3	0	1	2	0	1	0	2	0	9

Sheet C	1	2	3	4	5	6	7	8	9	10	11	Final
Quebec (Charette) 🔨	0	0	1	0	0	1	0	2	0	1	1	6
New Brunswick (Hanlon)	1	0	0	0	2	0	1	0	1	0	0	5

Sheet D	1	2	3	4	5	6	7	8	9	10	Final
Nova Scotia (Jones) 🔨	0	0	0	2	0	1	0	0	0	0	3
Manitoba (Laliberte)	0	1	0	0	1	0	0	1	0	2	5

=== Draw 12 ===
Wednesday, March 4, 10:30 am

Sheet A	1	2	3	4	5	6	7	8	9	10	Final
Nova Scotia (Jones) 🔨	1	0	0	1	0	1	0	0	0	1	4
Quebec (Charette)	0	0	1	0	1	0	2	0	1	0	5

Sheet B	1	2	3	4	5	6	7	8	9	10	Final
Newfoundland (Bartlett) 🔨	0	1	0	0	0	0	0	1	0	X	2
Manitoba (Laliberte)	0	0	2	0	1	1	0	0	2	X	6

Sheet C	1	2	3	4	5	6	7	8	9	10	11	Final
Prince Edward Island (Dolan) 🔨	0	1	0	1	0	0	1	0	0	3	0	6
Canada (Sutton)	1	0	1	0	1	1	0	1	1	0	2	8

Sheet D	1	2	3	4	5	6	7	8	9	10	11	Final
New Brunswick (Hanlon) 🔨	1	0	1	1	0	2	0	0	1	0	1	7
Saskatchewan (Schneider)	0	1	0	0	1	0	1	1	0	2	0	6

=== Draw 13 ===
Wednesday, March 4, 3:00 pm

Sheet A	1	2	3	4	5	6	7	8	9	10	Final
Alberta (Bernard) 🔨	0	2	0	1	0	0	1	0	0	0	4
British Columbia (Walker)	0	0	1	0	2	0	0	0	1	1	5

Sheet B	1	2	3	4	5	6	7	8	9	10	Final
Manitoba (Laliberte) 🔨	1	0	0	2	1	0	0	2	3	X	9
New Brunswick (Hanlon)	0	0	0	0	0	3	0	0	0	X	3

Sheet C	1	2	3	4	5	6	7	8	9	10	Final
Ontario (Clark) 🔨	0	0	0	0	1	0	1	0	3	X	5
Yukon/Northwest Territories (Moses)	0	0	0	0	0	1	0	1	0	X	2

Sheet D	1	2	3	4	5	6	7	8	9	10	Final
Canada (Sutton) 🔨	2	0	1	0	1	0	0	1	1	X	6
Newfoundland (Bartlett)	0	1	0	1	0	1	1	0	0	X	4

=== Draw 14 ===
Wednesday, March 4, 7:30 pm

Sheet A	1	2	3	4	5	6	7	8	9	10	Final
Saskatchewan (Schneider) 🔨	2	0	1	0	0	2	0	2	0	X	7
Prince Edward Island (Dolan)	0	1	0	0	0	0	1	0	1	X	3

Sheet B	1	2	3	4	5	6	7	8	9	10	Final
Quebec (Charette) 🔨	0	0	1	1	0	1	2	0	1	X	6
Alberta (Bernard)	0	0	0	0	1	0	0	1	0	X	2

Sheet C	1	2	3	4	5	6	7	8	9	10	Final
Yukon/Northwest Territories (Moses) 🔨	1	0	0	0	0	0	1	0	2	0	4
Nova Scotia (Jones)	0	1	0	1	0	1	0	1	0	2	6

Sheet D	1	2	3	4	5	6	7	8	9	10	Final
British Columbia (Walker) 🔨	0	2	0	3	1	0	3	1	X	X	10
Ontario (Clark)	1	0	1	0	0	2	0	0	X	X	4

=== Draw 15 ===
Thursday, March 5, 10:30 am

Sheet A	1	2	3	4	5	6	7	8	9	10	Final
Yukon/Northwest Territories (Moses) 🔨	0	0	0	0	0	1	0	0	X	X	1
Canada (Sutton)	0	1	1	2	1	0	1	1	X	X	7

Sheet B	1	2	3	4	5	6	7	8	9	10	Final
Ontario (Clark) 🔨	0	1	0	1	0	1	0	0	0	X	3
Prince Edward Island (Dolan)	0	0	1	0	3	0	0	1	1	X	6

Sheet C	1	2	3	4	5	6	7	8	9	10	11	Final
British Columbia (Walker) 🔨	0	0	0	0	2	0	0	2	0	3	1	8
Saskatchewan (Schneider)	0	0	1	0	0	3	2	0	1	0	0	7

Sheet D	1	2	3	4	5	6	7	8	9	10	Final
Manitoba (Laliberte) 🔨	1	0	2	0	1	0	3	X	X	X	7
Alberta (Bernard)	0	1	0	0	0	1	0	X	X	X	2

=== Draw 16 ===
Thursday, March 5, 3:00 pm

Sheet A	1	2	3	4	5	6	7	8	9	10	Final
Quebec (Charette) 🔨	1	0	0	3	0	0	0	2	0	0	6
Manitoba (Laliberte)	0	1	0	0	0	2	1	0	3	2	9

Sheet B	1	2	3	4	5	6	7	8	9	10	Final
Nova Scotia (Jones) 🔨	2	0	0	0	1	0	0	3	3	X	9
Newfoundland (Bartlett)	0	1	0	1	0	0	2	0	0	X	4

Sheet C	1	2	3	4	5	6	7	8	9	10	Final
Alberta (Bernard) 🔨	1	0	0	2	0	0	1	0	0	2	6
New Brunswick (Hanlon)	0	1	0	0	1	0	0	1	0	0	3

Sheet D	1	2	3	4	5	6	7	8	9	10	Final
Saskatchewan (Schneider) 🔨	0	0	1	0	1	0	0	2	1	1	6
Ontario (Clark)	0	1	0	0	0	4	0	0	0	0	5

=== Draw 17 ===
Thursday, March 5, 7:30 pm

Sheet A	1	2	3	4	5	6	7	8	9	10	Final
Canada (Sutton) 🔨	0	1	0	1	0	2	1	1	0	1	7
Nova Scotia (Jones)	0	0	3	0	2	0	0	0	1	0	6

Sheet B	1	2	3	4	5	6	7	8	9	10	Final
New Brunswick (Hanlon) 🔨	1	0	1	0	0	1	0	0	X	X	3
British Columbia (Walker)	0	2	0	2	3	0	1	2	X	X	10

Sheet C	1	2	3	4	5	6	7	8	9	10	Final
Newfoundland (Bartlett) 🔨	0	2	0	1	0	0	1	0	1	0	5
Quebec (Charette)	1	0	1	0	0	3	0	1	0	1	7

Sheet D	1	2	3	4	5	6	7	8	9	10	Final
Prince Edward Island (Dolan) 🔨	0	0	1	0	0	0	1	0	1	0	3
Yukon/Northwest Territories (Moses)	1	0	0	2	1	0	0	0	0	1	5

== Playoffs ==
Semifinal			Final
			1	Canada	3
2	Manitoba	7	2	Manitoba	7
3	British Columbia	6

=== Semifinal ===
Friday, March 6, 7:30 pm

Team	1	2	3	4	5	6	7	8	9	10	11	Final
Manitoba (Laliberte) 🔨	0	0	1	0	1	0	3	0	1	0	1	7
British Columbia (Walker)	1	0	0	1	0	2	0	1	0	1	0	6

Player percentages
Manitoba		British Columbia	
Janet Arnott	82%	Cathy Sauer	66%
Cathy Gauthier	72%	Cindy McArdie	83%
Laurie Allen	61%	Kelley Owen	50%
Connie Laliberte	75%	Lisa Walker	74%
Total	72%	Total	68%

=== Final ===
Saturday, March 7, 2:00 pm

Sheet C	1	2	3	4	5	6	7	8	9	10	Final
Canada (Sutton) 🔨	1	0	0	1	0	0	0	0	1	X	3
Manitoba (Laliberte)	0	1	1	0	1	1	2	1	0	X	7

Player percentages
Canada		Manitoba	
Karri Willms	67%	Janet Arnott	77%
Melissa Soligo	44%	Cathy Gauthier	71%
Jodie Sutton	76%	Laurie Allen	76%
Julie Sutton	60%	Connie Laliberte	85%
Total	62%	Total	77%

== Statistics ==
=== Top 5 player percentages ===
Final Round Robin Percentages

Key
All-Star Team

Leads	%
(Manitoba) Janet Arnott	78
(Saskatchewan) Lorie Kehler	77
(Canada) Karri Willms	76
(Nova Scotia) Sue Green	76
(New Brunswick) Judy Blanchard	71

Seconds	%
(Alberta) Barb Davies	77
(Nova Scotia) Kim Kelly	75
(Manitoba) Cathy Gauthier	74
(Canada) Melissa Soligo	73
(Saskatchewan) Joan Stricker	72

Thirds	%
(Saskatchewan) Kathy Fahlman	78
(Nova Scotia) Mary Mattatall	76
(Canada) Jodie Sutton	75
(Manitoba) Laurie Allen	72
(Quebec) Chantal Osborne	72

Skips	%
(British Columbia) Lisa Walker	75
(Saskatchewan) Michelle Schneider	75
(Manitoba) Connie Laliberte	74
(Canada) Julie Sutton	73
(Nova Scotia) Colleen Jones	71

== Awards ==
The all-star team and sportsmanship award winners were as follows:

=== All-Star Team ===
Position	Name	Team
Skip	Lisa Walker	British Columbia
Third	Kathy Fahlman	Saskatchewan
Second	Kim Kelly	Nova Scotia
Lead	Karri Willms	Canada

=== Joyce Myers Award ===
The Scotties Tournament of Hearts Sportsmanship Award is presented to the curler who best embodies the spirit of curling at the Scotties Tournament of Hearts. The winner was selected in a vote by all players at the tournament.

Prior to 1998, the award was named after a notable individual in the curling community where the tournament was held that year. For this edition, the award was named after Joyce Myers, a builder who was very involved in the curling administration, coaching, instructing, and officiating which earned her the Herb Millhan Award in 1986 for outstanding contribution to the Curling Canada program.

New Brunswick skip Heidi Hanlon became the first two-time recipient of the sportsmanship award after previously winning the award in 1989.

Name	Team	Position
Heidi Hanlon (2)	New Brunswick	Skip
