= Melissa Soligo =

Canadian female curler and coach

- Curler ♀
- Born: February 7, 1969 (age 57); Trail, British Columbia, Canada

Team
- Curling club: Victoria CC, Victoria, BC; Juan de Fuca CC, Victoria, BC

Curling career
- Member Association: British Columbia
- Hearts: 4 (1989, 1991, 1992, 1993)
- World Championship: 1 (1991)
- Olympic: 1 (1992 - demo)
Medal record
Women's curling
Representing Canada
Winter Olympics
Bronze medal – third place	1992 Albertville (demonstration)
World Championships
Silver medal – second place	1991 Winnipeg
Representing British Columbia
Scotties Tournament of Hearts
Gold medal – first place	1991 Saskatoon
Silver medal – second place	1992 Halifax

Melissa Soligo (born February 7, 1969, in Trail, British Columbia, Canada) is a Canadian curler and curling coach, currently living in Victoria, British Columbia.

Soligo began curling at age 11. In her youth, she also played volleyball, basketball, field hockey and fastball.

She is a 1991 World women's silver medallist and 1991 Canadian women's champion.

She won a bronze medal at the 1992 Winter Olympics when curling was a demonstration sport.

Her competitive curling career was cut short when she was struck by an intoxicated driver while she was walking. She then made the choice to switch to coaching. Early in her career she focused on coaching junior teams in Canada. In 2002 she began coaching the South Korean curling teams where under her leadership the men's team won the Pacific Curling Championship. She has also been the national team leader of Curling Canada's wheelchair curling program, the coach of BC's wheelchair curling team and is currently a national coach, mentor coach and High Performance Director at CurlBC.

== Personal life ==
Soligo has a bachelor of education degree with a major in physical education and geography from the University of Victoria. Achieved her Level 5 Professional Coach Certification (one of only two in Canada who have this in curling).

== Awards ==
- BC Curling Hall of Fame: 2026
- In Her Footsteps: 2023 (honours remarkable women who made significant contributions to sport in British Columbia as athletes, coaches, officials, pioneers, and builders)
- Joan Mead Builder Award: 2018 ("for her contributions to curling as a player, coach and High Performance Director at Curl BC")
- Greater Victoria Sports Hall of Fame: 2007, together with all of the Julie Sutton 1991–1993 team.
- Trail BC Home of Champions: 1996 (for those who have excelled in their chosen field of endeavor (industry, sport and lifestyle))

== Teams and events ==
Season	Skip	Third	Second	Lead	Alternate	Events
1987–88	Colleen Hannah	Melissa Soligo	Lori Atkins	Tracy Butt		CJCC 1988 (4th)
1988–89	Julie Sutton	Pat Sanders	Georgina Hawkes	Melissa Soligo	Diane Nelson	STOH 1989 (5th)
1990–91	Julie Sutton	Jodie Sutton	Melissa Soligo	Karri Willms	Elaine Dagg-Jackson	STOH 1991 (gold); WCC 1991 (silver)
1991–92	Julie Sutton	Jodie Sutton	Melissa Soligo	Karri Willms	Elaine Dagg-Jackson	STOH 1992 (silver); WOG 1992 (demo) (bronze)
1992–93	Julie Sutton	Jodie Sutton	Melissa Soligo	Karri Willms	Elaine Dagg-Jackson	STOH 1993 (4th)

== Record as a coach of national teams ==
Year	Tournament, event	National team	Place
2002	2002 Pacific Curling Championships	South Korea (men)	1st place, gold medalist(s)
2004	2004 World Junior Curling Championships	South Korea (men)	4
2004	2004 Pacific Curling Championships	South Korea (women)	3rd place, bronze medalist(s)
2016	2016 World Mixed Curling Championship	Canada (mixed)	5
