= Elaine Dagg-Jackson =

Canadian curler and coach (born 1955)

- Curler
- Born: Elaine Dagg; May 23, 1955 (age 71); Vancouver, British Columbia, Canada

Team
- Curling club: Racquet Club, Victoria, BC; Juan de Fuca CC, Victoria, BC, Richmond, Richmond, BC

Curling career
- Member Association: British Columbia
- Hearts: 6 (1987, 1988, 1991, 1992, 1993, 2000)
- World Championship: 1 (1991)
- Olympic: 1 (1992 - demo)
Medal record
Women's curling
Representing Canada
Winter Olympics
Bronze medal – third place	1992 Albertville (demonstration)
World Championships
Silver medal – second place	1991 Winnipeg
Representing British Columbia
Scotties Tournament of Hearts
Gold medal – first place	1987 Lethbridge
Gold medal – first place	1991 Saskatoon
Gold medal – first place	2000 Prince George
Silver medal – second place	1988 Fredericton
Silver medal – second place	1992 Halifax

Elaine Dagg-Jackson (born May 23, 1955 in Vancouver, British Columbia, Canada as Elaine Dagg) is a Canadian curler and curling coach from Victoria, British Columbia.

She is a 1991 World women's silver medallist and a three-time Canadian women's champion (1987, 1991, 2000).

She won a bronze medal at the 1992 Winter Olympics when curling was a demonstration sport.

== Personal life ==
Dagg-Jackson grew up in Kelowna. Her father is Lyall Dagg, winner of the 1964 Macdonald Brier. She moved to Victoria in 1986, and began curling competitively thereafter. Before her coaching career, she worked for Copeland Communications. She is married to curler and coach Glen Jackson.

== Awards ==
- Joan Mead Builder Award: 2011 ("Canadian Curling Association National Team Coach").
- British Columbia Curling Hall of Fame: 1996, together with all of the Julie Sutton 1991–1993 team.
- British Columbia Sports Hall of Fame: 1996, together with all of the 1987 Pat Sanders Rink.
- Greater Victoria Sports Hall of Fame: 2015.

== Teams and events ==
Season	Skip	Third	Second	Lead	Alternate	Events
1986–87	Pat Sanders	Louise Herlinveaux	Georgina Hawkes	Deb Massullo	Elaine Dagg-Jackson	STOH 1987 (gold)
1987–88	Pat Sanders	Louise Herlinveaux	Georgina Hawkes	Deb Massullo	Elaine Dagg-Jackson	STOH 1988 (silver)
1990–91	Julie Sutton	Jodie Sutton	Melissa Soligo	Karri Willms	Elaine Dagg-Jackson	STOH 1991 (gold); WCC 1991 (silver)
1991–92	Julie Sutton	Jodie Sutton	Melissa Soligo	Karri Willms	Elaine Dagg-Jackson	STOH 1992 (silver); WOG 1992 (demo) (bronze)
1992–93	Julie Sutton	Jodie Sutton	Melissa Soligo	Karri Willms	Elaine Dagg-Jackson	STOH 1993 (4th)
1999–00	Kelley Law	Julie Skinner	Georgina Wheatcroft	Diane Nelson	Elaine Dagg-Jackson	STOH 2000 (gold)

== Record as a coach of national teams ==
Year	Tournament, event	National team	Place
1998	1998 Winter Olympics	Japan (women)	5
1998	1998 World Women's Curling Championship	Japan (women)	8
1998	1998 Pacific Curling Championships	Japan (women)	1st place, gold medalist(s)
1999	1999 World Junior Curling Championships	Japan (junior women)	2nd place, silver medalist(s)
1999	1999 World Women's Curling Championship	Japan (women)	9
2000	2000 World Women's Curling Championship	Canada (women)	1st place, gold medalist(s)
2001	2001 Pacific Curling Championships	South Korea (women)	1st place, gold medalist(s)
2002	2002 World Women's Curling Championship	South Korea (women)	10
2002	2002 Pacific Curling Championships	South Korea (women)	2nd place, silver medalist(s)
2003	2003 World Men's Curling Championship	South Korea (men)	10
2005	2005 World Women's Curling Championship	Canada (women)	4
2006	2006 Winter Olympics	Canada (women)	3rd place, bronze medalist(s)
2010	2010 Winter Olympics	Canada (women)	2nd place, silver medalist(s)
2018	2018 Winter Olympics	Canada (women)	6
