= Scotties Tournament of Hearts Shot of the Week Award =

Shot of the Week Award
- Sport: Curling
- Competition: Scotties Tournament of Hearts
- Awarded for: The most outstanding shot during the annual Scotties Tournament of Hearts.

History
- First award: 1997
- First winner: (Saskatchewan) Sandra Schmirler
- Most wins: (Manitoba) Jennifer Jones (2)
- Most recent: (Ontario) Rachel Homan

The Shot of the Week Award at the annual Scotties Tournament of Hearts is presented to the individual curler who executes the most outstanding shot during the tournament. The award has been presented since 1997. The inaugural winner was Sandra Schmirler of Saskatchewan. It was last presented in 2013.

== Winners ==
Year	Winner	Team
1997	Sandra Schmirler	Saskatchewan
1998	Anne Merklinger	Ontario
1999	Cathy Borst	Canada
2000	Julie Skinner	British Columbia
2001	Marie-France Larouche	Quebec
2002	Sherry Anderson	Saskatchewan
2003	Cathy Cunningham	Newfoundland and Labrador
2004	Lois Fowler	Manitoba
2005	Jennifer Jones	Manitoba
2006	Jennifer Jones	Canada
2007	Jan Betker	Saskatchewan
2008	Sherry Middaugh	Ontario
2009	Kerry Galusha	Northwest Territories/Yukon
2010	Krista McCarville	Ontario
2011	Amber Holland	Saskatchewan
2012	Sasha Carter	British Columbia
2013	Rachel Homan	Ontario
