= Karri Willms =

Canadian curler and coach

- Curler ♀
- Born: April 16, 1969 (age 57)

Team
- Curling club: Victoria CC, Victoria, Juan de Fuca CC, Victoria

Curling career
- Member Association: British Columbia
- Hearts: 3 (1991, 1992, 1993)
- World Championship: 1 (1991)
- Olympic: 1 (1992 - demo)
Medal record
Women's curling
Representing Canada
Winter Olympics
Bronze medal – third place	1992 Albertville (demonstration)
World Championships
Silver medal – second place	1991 Winnipeg
Representing British Columbia
Scotties Tournament of Hearts
Gold medal – first place	1991 Saskatoon
Silver medal – second place	1992 Halifax

Karri Anne Willms (born April 16, 1969) is a Canadian curler and curling coach from Vernon, British Columbia.

She is a 1991 World women's silver medallist and 1991 Canadian women's champion.

She won a bronze medal at the 1992 Winter Olympics when curling was a demonstration sport. She retired from curling afterwards.

In 2018 she began working for the World Curling Federation as the Competitions and Development Officer.

== Personal life ==
Willms worked at a bank before her and husband Renato Lepore "took a break" and moved to Novara, Italy to work as mechanics on the JD Motorsport pit crew in Formula Renault racing.

== Awards ==
- STOH All-Star teams: 1992 (lead)
- British Columbia Curling Hall of Fame: 1996, together with all of the Julie Sutton 1991–1993 team.

== Teams and events ==
Season	Skip	Third	Second	Lead	Alternate	Events
1990–91	Julie Sutton	Jodie Sutton	Melissa Soligo	Karri Willms	Elaine Dagg-Jackson	STOH 1991 (gold); WCC 1991 (silver)
1991–92	Julie Sutton	Jodie Sutton	Melissa Soligo	Karri Willms	Elaine Dagg-Jackson	STOH 1992 (silver); WOG 1992 (demo) (bronze)
1992–93	Julie Sutton	Jodie Sutton	Melissa Soligo	Karri Willms	Elaine Dagg-Jackson	STOH 1993 (4th)

== Record as a coach of national teams ==
Year	Tournament, event	National team	Place
2012	2012 European Curling Championships	Italy (men)	15
2013	2013 Olympic Qualifying Event	Latvia (women)	5
2014	2014 European Curling Championships	Latvia (men)	10
