= Heidi Hanlon =

Canadian curler (born 1958)

- Curler
- Born: October 9, 1958 (age 68); Harvey, New Brunswick, Canada

Curling career
- Member Association: New Brunswick
- Hearts: 11 (1987, 1989, 1990, 1991, 1992, 1994, 1995, 1997, 2000, 2003, 2004)
Medal record
Curling
Representing Canada
World Senior Curling Championships
| Gold medal – first place | 2012 Tårnby |
Representing New Brunswick
Scotties Tournament of Hearts
| Silver medal – second place | 1991 Saskatoon |
Canadian Senior Curling Championships
| Gold medal – first place | 2011 Digby |
| Silver medal – second place | 2010 Ottawa |

Heidi Hanlon (born Brennan; October 9, 1958, in Harvey, New Brunswick) is a Canadian curler from Saint John, New Brunswick.

Hanlon is an 11-time provincial women's champion skip, provincial mixed champion and two-time provincial women's seniors championship. She became a Canadian champion for the first time by winning the 2011 Canadian Senior Curling Championships. It was the first women's title for the province.

She has played in 11 Scotties Tournament of Hearts. Her first Hearts was in 1987, where she finished with a 4–7 record. In 1989, she improved with a 7–4 record, and lost in tie-breaker to Julie Sutton. In 1990, she finished 5–6. In 1991, she finished the round robin with an 8–3 record. She won her semi final match against Ontario's Heather Houston, but lost to Julie Sutton once again, in the final of the 1991 Scott Tournament of Hearts. In 1992, Hanlon's rink finished with a dismal 3–8 record. In 1994 her record was 4–7, as it was in 1995 and again in 1997 and in 2000. In 2003, she finished with a slightly better 5–6 record before finished with a paltry 2–9 record in her final Hearts in 2004.

She has only represented New Brunswick once at the Canadian Mixed Curling Championship, in 2002 playing third for Wade Blanchard. The team finished with a 3–8 record.

Hanlon had more success when she became a senior. In her first Canadian Senior Curling Championships in 2010, she lost in the final to British Columbia's Christine Jurgenson. In 2011, she improved on this by winning the event, defeating Ontario's Joyce Potter in the final. Heidi Hanlon won the 2012 World Senior Curling Championships in Tårnby, Denmark.
