= Mette Halvorsen =

Norwegian curler

- Curler
- Born: 19 January 1965 (age 61)

Curling career
- World Championship: 3 (1989, 1990, 1991)
- European Championship: 6 (1985, 1986, 1987, 1988, 1989, 1990)
Medal record
Women's curling
Representing Norway
Olympic Games
Silver medal – second place	1992 Albertville (demonstration)
Bronze medal – third place	1988 Calgary (demonstration)
World Championships
Gold medal – first place	1990 Västerås
Gold medal – first place	1991 Winnipeg
Silver medal – second place	1989 Milwaukee
European Curling Championships
Gold medal – first place	1990 Lillehammer
Bronze medal – third place	1985 Grindelwald
Bronze medal – third place	1987 Oberstdorf

Mette Halvorsen (born 19 January 1965) is a Norwegian curler, two times world champion playing for the Norwegian national team with skip Dordi Nordby.

== Olympics ==
Halvorsen participated at the demonstration event at the 1988 Winter Olympics, where the team finished third, and again at the demonstration event at the 1992 Winter Olympics, finishing second.
