= Angela Roberts (curler) =

Canadian curler (1968–2024)

Angela Dawn Smith (née Roberts, 1968 – October 23, 2024) was a Canadian curler. She was a former Canadian Mixed Champion, and two time Prince Edward Island Scott Tournament of Hearts champion.

Roberts was the daughter of Francis Roberts and Mickey (Alice) Hughes.

== Curling career ==
As a junior curler, Roberts first found success playing third on the Lori Robinson rink. The team won the PEI junior championships in 1986 and 1987, and represented the province at the 1987 Canada Winter Games, where they finished in 6th place. Representing Prince Edward Island, the team went 4–6 at the 1986 Canadian Junior Women's Curling Championship and 3–7 at the 1987 Canadian Junior Curling Championships. In 1988, Roberts won a third provincial junior championship, this time as a skip. She led her team of Cathy Campbell, Anne Dillon and Gail MacNeil to a 6–4 record. This put the team into a four-way tie for third place. However, they lost in a tiebreaker game against the Yukon/Northwest Territories team.

In 1989, Roberts won the provincial mixed championship, playing third on a team skipped by Robert Campbell. The team would go on to win the 1989 Canadian Mixed Curling Championship, where they beat Manitoba, skipped by Jeff Stoughton in the final.

In 1991, Roberts won her first women's provincial championship, skipping a team of Kathy O'Rourke, Susan McCurdy and Bea Graham-MacDonald in just their first season together. They beat Kim Dolan in the provincial final. At the 1991 Scott Tournament of Hearts, the national women's championship, she led the team to a 2–9 record. In 1993, she won her only other provincial women's title, leading a rink consisting of Sara Gatchell, Janice MacCallum and Nancy Reid. The team beat Roberts' former teammate Kathy O'Rourke in the final. At the 1993 Scott Tournament of Hearts, the finished 5–6.

Roberts was inducted into the PEI Curling Hall of Fame in 2024.

== Personal life and death ==
Roberts was married to Jamie Smith and had one son. In addition to curling, she and her husband raced, bred and boarded horses. She worked as an educational assistant with the Public Schools Branch. She died at the Queen Elizabeth Hospital in Charlottetown, Prince Edward Island, on October 23, 2024, at the age of 56. She was inducted into the PEI Curling Hall of Fame the day prior.
