= Laurie Allen (curler) =

Canadian curler and coach

- Curler ♀

Team
- Curling club: Fort Rouge CC, Winnipeg, MB

Curling career
- Member Association: Manitoba
- Hearts: 4 (1989, 1990, 1992, 1993)
- World Championship: 1 (1992)
Medal record
Curling
Representing Canada
World Championships
Bronze medal – third place	1992 Garmisch-Partenkirchen
Representing Manitoba
Scotties Tournament of Hearts
Gold medal – first place	1992 Halifax
Silver medal – second place	1989 Kelowna

Laurie Lynne Allen (born c. 1963) is a Canadian curler.

She is a World women's bronze medallist and 1992 Canadian women's champion.

In 2011, she was inducted into Manitoba Curling Hall of Fame together with all members of Connie Laliberte teams of 1992 and 1995.

== Awards ==
- Scotties Tournament of Hearts Sportsmanship Award: 1993 (in 1993 it named as "Mabel Mitchell Award")

== Teams and events ==
Season	Skip	Third	Second	Lead	Alternate	Events
1982–83	Laurie Allen	Donna Rae Gould	Faye Irwin	Stacey Dawn Withers		CJCC 1983 (bronze)
1988–89	Chris More	Karen Purdy	Lori Zeller	Kristen Kuruluk	Laurie Allen	STOH 1989 (silver)
1989–90	Janet Harvey	Jennifer Ryan	Janine Sigurdson	Kim Overton	Laurie Allen	STOH 1990 (8th)
1991–92	Connie Laliberte	Laurie Allen	Cathy Gauthier	Janet Arnott		STOH 1992 (gold); WCC 1992 (bronze)
1992–93	Connie Laliberte	Laurie Allen	Cathy Gauthier	Janet Arnott	Corrine Webb	STOH 1993 (5th)
