= Jodie Sutton =

Canadian female curler

- Curler ♀
- Other names: Jody Sutton
- Born: April 23, 1968 (age 58)

Team
- Curling club: Juan de Fuca CC, Victoria, British Columbia

Curling career
- Member Association: British Columbia
- Hearts: 4 (1988, 1991, 1992, 1993)
- World Championship: 1 (1991)
- Olympic: 1 (1992 - demo)
Medal record
Women's curling
Representing Canada
Winter Olympics
Bronze medal – third place	1992 Albertville (demonstration)
World Championships
Silver medal – second place	1991 Winnipeg
Representing British Columbia
Scotties Tournament of Hearts
Gold medal – first place	1991 Saskatoon
Silver medal – second place	1992 Halifax

Jodie Ann Sutton (born April 23, 1968) is a Canadian curler.

She is a 1991 World women's silver medallist and 1991 Canadian women's champion.

She won a bronze medal at the 1992 Winter Olympics when curling was a demonstration sport.

In 1996, she was inducted into British Columbia Curling Hall of Fame together with all of the Julie Sutton 1991–1993 team.

== Teams and events ==
Season	Skip	Third	Second	Lead	Alternate	Events
1985–86	Jodie Sutton	Julie Sutton	Dawn Rubner	Chris Thompson		CJCC 1986 (gold)
1987–88	Chris Stevenson	Cindy Tucker	Diane Nelson	Sandra Martin	Jodie Sutton	STOH 1988 (4th)
1990–91	Julie Sutton	Jodie Sutton	Melissa Soligo	Karri Willms	Elaine Dagg-Jackson	STOH 1991 (gold); WCC 1991 (silver)
1991–92	Julie Sutton	Jodie Sutton	Melissa Soligo	Karri Willms	Elaine Dagg-Jackson	STOH 1992 (silver); WOG 1992 (demo) (bronze)
1992–93	Julie Sutton	Jodie Sutton	Melissa Soligo	Karri Willms	Elaine Dagg-Jackson	STOH 1993 (4th)

== Private life ==
She is the twin sister of Julie Skinner (née Sutton), and were longtime teammates.
