= 1986 Canadian Junior Women's Curling Championship =

The 1986 Canadian Junior Women's Curling Championship was held March 15-22 at the Noranda Curling Club in Noranda, Quebec.

Team British Columbia, skipped by Jodie Sutton won the event, defeating Newfoundland's Jill Noseworthy rink in the final, 4–3. The two teams had finished the round robin in a 3-way tie for first with Manitoba's Janet Harvey, and BC earned the bye to the final after winning a coin toss. Newfoundland beat Manitoba in the semifinal 7–3.

It would be the last year where the men's and women's junior tournaments would be held at separate times.

== Teams ==
The teams were as follows:

Province / Territory	Skip	Third	Second	Lead	Locale
British Columbia	Jodie Sutton	Julie Sutton	Dawn Rubner	Chris Thompson	Oliver
Alberta	Tana Materi	Rosalie Pilling	Ledean Rauhalla	Carla Pilling	Lethbridge
Saskatchewan	Sherry Hamel	Laurel Kostuk	Crystal Ann Kuntz	Brenda Eyolfson	Saskatoon
Manitoba	Janet Harvey	Cathy Overton	Kristen Kuruluk	Kim Overton	Winnipeg
Ontario	Lisa Lascelles	Cheryl Paquette	Kelly Rothwell	Carrie Power	Ottawa
Quebec	Patty Levelle	Lesley Ryan	Deanna Beverage	Tracey Knox	Dollard-des-Ormeaux
New Brunswick	Monique Masse	Linda Desjardins	Susan Toner	Monique Toner	Moncton
Nova Scotia	Julie Myra	Shona Kinley	Nicole Crouse	Jennifer Flack	Halifax
Prince Edward Island	Lori Robinson	Angela Roberts	Ann Dillon	Cathy Campbell	Charlottetown
Newfoundland	Jill Noseworthy	Sonya White	Karen Penny	Annette Osbourne	St. John's
Northwest Territories/Yukon	Gwen Young	Denise Babkirk	Tracey Cook	Melaine Smith	Hay River

== Round Robin Standings ==
Final standings

Key
Teams to Playoffs

Team	Skip	W	L
Manitoba	Janet Harvey	8	2
British Columbia	Jodie Sutton	8	2
Newfoundland	Jill Noseworthy	8	2
New Brunswick	Monique Masse	6	4
Saskatchewan	Sherry Hamel	6	4
Ontario	Lisa Lascelles	5	5
Alberta	Tana Materi	5	5
Prince Edward Island	Lori Robinson	4	6
Nova Scotia	Julie Myra	3	7
Quebec	Patty Levelle	2	8
Northwest Territories/Yukon	Gwen Young	0	10

== Playoffs ==
Semifinal		Final
		Newfoundland	3
Manitoba	3	British Columbia	4
Newfoundland	7

=== Semifinal ===
March 22

Team	1	2	3	4	5	6	7	8	9	10	Final
Newfoundland (Noseworthy)	1	0	0	2	1	0	1	2	0	X	7
Manitoba (Harvey)	0	2	0	0	0	0	0	1	X	X	3

=== Final ===
March 22

Team	1	2	3	4	5	6	7	8	9	10	Final
Newfoundland (Noseworthy)	0	0	1	1	0	0	0	0	1	0	3
British Columbia (Sutton)	1	0	0	0	0	0	0	2	0	1	4
