= 2000 Scott Tournament of Hearts =

Canadian women's curling championship

- Host city: Prince George, British Columbia
- Arena: CN Centre
- Dates: February 19–27
- Attendance: 54,778
- Winner: British Columbia
- Curling club: Richmond CC, Richmond
- Skip: Kelley Law
- Third: Julie Skinner
- Second: Georgina Wheatcroft
- Lead: Diane Nelson
- Alternate: Elaine Dagg-Jackson
- Finalist: Ontario (Anne Merklinger)

The 2000 Scott Tournament of Hearts, the Canadian women's national curling championship, was held from February 19 to 27, 2000 at the CN Centre in Prince George, British Columbia. The total attendance for the week was 54,778.

Team British Columbia, who was skipped by Kelley Law won the event beating Ontario in the final 9–4. This was BC's eighth title overall and the sixth time a province has won a title on home soil. Law's rink became the first rink to win the championship as a fourth seed since the introduction of the Page playoff system in 1995 and also became the first rink since 1989 and fourth team ever to win a championship after having to win a tiebreaker game.

Law's rink would go onto represent Canada at the 2000 Ford World Women's Curling Championship in Glasgow, Scotland, which they won. The national championship also qualified them for the 2001 Canadian Olympic Curling Trials in Regina, Saskatchewan, which they also won and got to represent Canada at the 2002 Winter Olympics in Ogden, Utah, United States.

== Teams ==
The teams were listed as follows:

Team Canada	Alberta	British Columbia
Mayflower CC, Halifax Skip: Colleen Jones; Third: Kim Kelly; Second: Mary-Anne Waye; Lead: Nancy Delahunt	Ottewell CC, Edmonton Skip: Heather Nedohin; Third: Carmen Barrack; Second: Kristie Moore; Lead: Rona McGregor; Alternate: Chantel Davison	Richmond CC, Richmond Skip: Kelley Law; Third: Julie Skinner; Second: Georgina Wheatcroft; Lead: Diane Nelson; Alternate: Elaine Dagg-Jackson
Manitoba	New Brunswick	Newfoundland
Fort Rouge CC, Winnipeg Skip: Connie Laliberte; Third: Cathy Overton-Clapham; Second: Debbie Jones-Walker; Lead: Janet Arnott; Alternate: Jill Staub	Thistle St. Andrews CC, Saint John Skip: Heidi Hanlon; Third: Sue Dobson; Second: Sheri Stewart; Lead: Judy Blanchard; Alternate: Jennifer Perrin	St. John's CC, St. John's Skip: Heather Strong; Third: Kelli Sharpe; Second: Susan Wright; Lead: Michele Renouf; Alternate: Marcie Brown
Nova Scotia	Ontario	Prince Edward Island
Mayflower CC, Halifax Skip: Kay Zinck; Third: Heather Smith-Dacey; Second: Krista Bernard; Lead: Laine Peters; Alternate: Cathy Donald	Rideau CC, Ottawa Skip: Anne Merklinger; Third: Theresa Breen; Second: Patti McKnight; Lead: Audrey Frey; Alternate: Christine McCrady	Charlottetown CC, Charlottetown Skip: Shelly Bradley; Third: Janice MacCallum; Second: Leslie Allan; Lead: Tricia MacGregor; Alternate: Lori Robinson
Quebec	Saskatchewan	Yukon/Northwest Territories
Rosemere CC, Montreal Skip: Janique Berthelot; Third: Joelle Sabourin (Note: Team Quebec alternate Marie-France Larouche threw third stones in Draw 8, second stones in Draw 10, and lead stones in Draw 14.); Second: Annie Lemay; Lead: Valerie Leclerc; Alternate: Marie-France Larouche	Caledonian CC, Regina Skip: June Campbell; Third: Cathy Walter; Second: Karen Daku; Lead: Leanne Whitrow; Alternate: Sherry Anderson	Whitehorse CC, Whitehorse Skip: Sandra Hatton; Third: Rhonda Horte; Second: Carrie Stahl; Lead: Margaret Lea Phillips; Alternate: Dawn Moses

== Map of teams ==
Team Canada Provincial Winners

== Round Robin standings ==
Final Round Robin standings

Key
Teams to Playoffs
Teams to Tiebreaker

Locale	Skip	W	L	W–L	PF	PA	EW	EL	BE	SE	S%
Ontario	Anne Merklinger	10	1	–	86	58	57	44	5	20	80%
Manitoba	Connie Laliberte	9	2	–	83	51	55	38	6	22	81%
Saskatchewan	June Campbell	8	3	–	72	54	48	42	7	12	80%
British Columbia	Kelley Law	7	4	1–0	84	62	55	41	2	22	78%
Nova Scotia	Kay Zinck	7	4	0–1	64	70	45	47	10	10	76%
Alberta	Heather Nedohin	6	5	–	69	70	47	46	1	12	76%
Canada	Colleen Jones	5	6	–	72	78	42	53	6	5	80%
Quebec	Janique Berthelot	4	7	1–0	73	87	47	47	5	15	71%
New Brunswick	Heidi Hanlon	4	7	0–1	64	73	45	50	3	14	74%
Prince Edward Island	Shelly Bradley	3	8	1–0	59	72	41	48	9	8	78%
Newfoundland	Heather Strong	3	8	0–1	62	82	41	51	4	10	74%
Yukon/Northwest Territories	Sandra Hatton	0	11	–	54	85	38	54	5	7	70%

== Round Robin results ==
All draw times are listed in Pacific Standard Time (UTC-08:00).

=== Draw 1 ===
Saturday, February 19, 3:00 pm

Sheet A	1	2	3	4	5	6	7	8	9	10	Final
Yukon/Northwest Territories (Hatton)	0	0	0	0	0	0	1	0	0	X	1
Quebec (Berthelot) 🔨	0	0	0	1	1	1	0	1	1	X	5

Sheet B	1	2	3	4	5	6	7	8	9	10	Final
Ontario (Merklinger)	0	2	0	1	0	1	1	0	0	2	7
Saskatchewan (Campbell) 🔨	1	0	1	0	1	0	0	1	2	0	6

Sheet C	1	2	3	4	5	6	7	8	9	10	Final
Canada (Jones) 🔨	2	1	1	0	1	0	3	0	3	X	11
New Brunswick (Hanlon)	0	0	0	3	0	1	0	2	0	X	6

Sheet D	1	2	3	4	5	6	7	8	9	10	Final
Nova Scotia (Zinck)	0	0	0	0	1	1	1	0	1	0	4
British Columbia (Law) 🔨	2	0	1	1	0	0	0	1	0	1	6

=== Draw 2 ===
Saturday, February 19, 7:30 pm

Sheet A	1	2	3	4	5	6	7	8	9	10	Final
New Brunswick (Hanlon) 🔨	2	0	0	1	0	0	1	5	X	X	9
Nova Scotia (Zinck)	0	0	1	0	1	0	0	0	X	X	2

Sheet B	1	2	3	4	5	6	7	8	9	10	Final
Newfoundland (Strong) 🔨	1	0	0	2	0	0	2	0	1	0	6
Alberta (Nedohin)	0	1	0	0	2	1	0	2	0	1	7

Sheet C	1	2	3	4	5	6	7	8	9	10	Final
Manitoba (Laliberte) 🔨	0	2	0	0	0	1	0	2	2	X	7
Prince Edward Island (Bradley)	0	0	2	0	0	0	2	0	0	X	4

Sheet D	1	2	3	4	5	6	7	8	9	10	Final
Yukon/Northwest Territories (Hatton) 🔨	1	0	1	0	0	1	X	X	X	X	3
Saskatchewan (Campbell)	0	1	0	6	2	0	X	X	X	X	9

=== Draw 3 ===
Sunday, February 20, 9:00 am

Sheet B	1	2	3	4	5	6	7	8	9	10	Final
Manitoba (Laliberte) 🔨	1	0	1	1	0	0	2	1	1	X	7
Canada (Jones)	0	1	0	0	1	0	0	0	0	X	2

Sheet C	1	2	3	4	5	6	7	8	9	10	Final
British Columbia (Law) 🔨	1	0	2	1	1	2	0	3	X	X	10
Yukon/Northwest Territories (Hatton)	0	1	0	0	0	0	2	0	X	X	3

=== Draw 4 ===
Sunday, February 20, 3:00 pm

Sheet A	1	2	3	4	5	6	7	8	9	10	Final
Newfoundland (Strong) 🔨	1	0	0	0	0	1	0	X	X	X	2
Manitoba (Laliberte)	0	2	0	1	1	0	4	X	X	X	8

Sheet B	1	2	3	4	5	6	7	8	9	10	Final
Prince Edward Island (Bradley) 🔨	0	1	1	0	1	0	1	0	0	X	4
New Brunswick (Hanlon)	1	0	0	3	0	1	0	1	1	X	7

Sheet C	1	2	3	4	5	6	7	8	9	10	Final
Saskatchewan (Campbell) 🔨	0	2	0	4	0	1	0	1	0	X	8
Alberta (Nedohin)	0	0	1	0	1	0	2	0	1	X	5

Sheet D	1	2	3	4	5	6	7	8	9	10	Final
Quebec (Berthelot) 🔨	0	2	0	0	0	0	X	X	X	X	2
Ontario (Merklinger)	2	0	2	2	6	2	X	X	X	X	14

=== Draw 5 ===
Sunday, February 20, 7:30 pm

Sheet A	1	2	3	4	5	6	7	8	9	10	Final
Canada (Jones) 🔨	1	0	2	0	2	2	0	0	4	X	11
British Columbia (Law)	0	2	0	2	0	0	1	2	0	X	7

Sheet B	1	2	3	4	5	6	7	8	9	10	Final
Nova Scotia (Zinck) 🔨	0	3	0	0	3	0	2	0	0	2	10
Quebec (Berthelot)	1	0	2	1	0	3	0	1	0	0	8

Sheet C	1	2	3	4	5	6	7	8	9	10	11	Final
Ontario (Merklinger) 🔨	1	0	0	1	1	0	0	2	0	0	1	6
Newfoundland (Strong)	0	1	1	0	0	1	0	0	1	1	0	5

Sheet D	1	2	3	4	5	6	7	8	9	10	Final
Alberta (Nedohin) 🔨	2	0	1	1	3	0	0	1	0	X	8
Prince Edward Island (Bradley)	0	1	0	0	0	2	1	0	1	X	5

=== Draw 6 ===
Monday, February 21, 9:00 am

Sheet A	1	2	3	4	5	6	7	8	9	10	Final
Quebec (Berthelot) 🔨	0	1	1	0	2	1	4	2	X	X	11
New Brunswick (Hanlon)	0	0	0	1	0	0	0	0	X	X	1

Sheet B	1	2	3	4	5	6	7	8	9	10	Final
Saskatchewan (Campbell) 🔨	0	0	2	0	0	0	3	0	0	2	7
Newfoundland (Strong)	0	0	0	1	1	0	0	1	1	0	4

Sheet C	1	2	3	4	5	6	7	8	9	10	11	Final
Prince Edward Island (Bradley) 🔨	1	0	0	0	1	0	0	2	0	2	0	6
Canada (Jones)	0	0	2	0	0	3	0	0	1	0	1	7

Sheet D	1	2	3	4	5	6	7	8	9	10	Final
British Columbia (Law) 🔨	0	1	0	2	0	0	1	1	0	X	5
Manitoba (Laliberte)	2	0	3	0	3	1	0	0	2	X	11

=== Draw 7 ===
Monday, February 21, 3:00 pm

Sheet A	1	2	3	4	5	6	7	8	9	10	Final
Manitoba (Laliberte) 🔨	0	1	0	0	2	1	1	0	1	2	8
Yukon/Northwest Territories (Hatton)	0	0	1	3	0	0	0	1	0	0	5

Sheet B	1	2	3	4	5	6	7	8	9	10	Final
Alberta (Nedohin) 🔨	0	2	0	0	2	0	0	1	0	X	5
British Columbia (Law)	1	0	3	1	0	2	1	0	2	X	10

Sheet C	1	2	3	4	5	6	7	8	9	10	11	Final
New Brunswick (Hanlon) 🔨	0	1	1	0	0	1	0	0	1	0	0	4
Saskatchewan (Campbell)	0	0	0	1	1	0	0	1	0	1	1	5

Sheet D	1	2	3	4	5	6	7	8	9	10	11	Final
Ontario (Merklinger) 🔨	0	1	0	0	1	0	2	0	1	1	0	6
Nova Scotia (Zinck)	0	0	3	1	0	1	0	1	0	0	1	7

=== Draw 8 ===
Monday, February 21, 8:00 pm

Sheet A	1	2	3	4	5	6	7	8	9	10	Final
Nova Scotia (Zinck) 🔨	1	1	0	0	0	0	0	1	0	X	3
Prince Edward Island (Bradley)	0	0	2	0	0	1	1	0	2	X	6

Sheet B	1	2	3	4	5	6	7	8	9	10	Final
Canada (Jones) 🔨	0	1	0	0	2	0	0	1	0	0	4
Ontario (Merklinger)	2	0	1	0	0	0	2	0	1	1	7

Sheet C	1	2	3	4	5	6	7	8	9	10	11	Final
Yukon/Northwest Territories (Hatton) 🔨	0	2	0	0	0	1	0	1	0	2	0	6
Alberta (Nedohin)	0	0	2	2	0	0	1	0	1	0	1	7

Sheet D	1	2	3	4	5	6	7	8	9	10	Final
Newfoundland (Strong) 🔨	2	0	0	0	0	4	0	1	1	2	10
Quebec (Berthelot)	0	2	1	2	2	0	2	0	0	0	9

=== Draw 9 ===
Tuesday, February 22, 9:00 am

Sheet A	1	2	3	4	5	6	7	8	9	10	Final
Yukon/Northwest Territories (Hatton) 🔨	1	0	2	0	3	1	0	0	1	0	8
Ontario (Merklinger)	0	2	0	1	0	0	2	2	0	2	9

Sheet B	1	2	3	4	5	6	7	8	9	10	Final
British Columbia (Law) 🔨	1	0	2	1	0	1	2	0	0	1	8
Prince Edward Island (Bradley)	0	2	0	0	2	0	0	0	2	0	6

Sheet C	1	2	3	4	5	6	7	8	9	10	Final
Saskatchewan (Campbell) 🔨	1	0	1	0	4	0	4	1	X	X	11
Quebec (Berthelot)	0	2	0	1	0	1	0	0	X	X	4

Sheet D	1	2	3	4	5	6	7	8	9	10	Final
Nova Scotia (Zinck) 🔨	0	1	0	2	1	0	0	0	1	X	5
Alberta (Nedohin)	0	0	1	0	0	1	0	0	0	X	2

=== Draw 10 ===
Tuesday, February 22, 3:00 pm

Sheet A	1	2	3	4	5	6	7	8	9	10	Final
Prince Edward Island (Bradley) 🔨	0	3	0	0	2	0	1	1	1	X	8
Newfoundland (Strong)	0	0	1	0	0	3	0	0	0	X	4

Sheet B	1	2	3	4	5	6	7	8	9	10	Final
Ontario (Merklinger) 🔨	1	0	2	1	1	0	0	2	0	1	8
New Brunswick (Hanlon)	0	2	0	0	0	2	1	0	1	0	6

Sheet C	1	2	3	4	5	6	7	8	9	10	Final
Alberta (Nedohin) 🔨	0	2	0	0	0	1	0	1	0	X	4
Manitoba (Laliberte)	0	0	1	1	1	0	2	0	2	X	7

Sheet D	1	2	3	4	5	6	7	8	9	10	11	Final
Quebec (Berthelot) 🔨	0	1	0	2	0	1	0	2	1	0	1	8
Canada (Jones)	0	0	1	0	3	0	2	0	0	1	0	7

=== Draw 11 ===
Tuesday, February 22, 7:30 pm

Sheet A	1	2	3	4	5	6	7	8	9	10	Final
New Brunswick (Hanlon) 🔨	0	1	0	1	0	2	1	1	0	1	7
British Columbia (Law)	1	0	2	0	1	0	0	0	1	0	5

Sheet B	1	2	3	4	5	6	7	8	9	10	Final
Newfoundland (Strong) 🔨	3	0	1	0	1	0	0	1	0	4	10
Yukon/Northwest Territories (Hatton)	0	1	0	2	0	1	3	0	1	0	8

Sheet C	1	2	3	4	5	6	7	8	9	10	Final
Canada (Jones) 🔨	1	0	0	0	1	0	3	0	3	0	8
Nova Scotia (Zinck)	0	1	0	3	0	2	0	3	0	1	10

Sheet D	1	2	3	4	5	6	7	8	9	10	Final
Manitoba (Laliberte) 🔨	2	0	1	0	0	0	1	0	2	0	6
Saskatchewan (Campbell)	0	1	0	1	1	1	0	1	0	2	7

=== Draw 12 ===
Wednesday, February 23, 8:00 am

Sheet A	1	2	3	4	5	6	7	8	9	10	Final
Saskatchewan (Campbell) 🔨	0	1	0	0	0	1	0	1	1	0	4
Nova Scotia (Zinck)	1	0	0	1	1	0	1	0	0	1	5

Sheet B	1	2	3	4	5	6	7	8	9	10	Final
Quebec (Berthelot) 🔨	2	0	0	1	0	0	1	0	1	X	5
Alberta (Nedohin)	0	2	1	0	2	1	0	2	0	X	8

Sheet C	1	2	3	4	5	6	7	8	9	10	Final
Ontario (Merklinger) 🔨	1	0	2	0	2	0	2	0	1	X	8
Prince Edward Island (Bradley)	0	1	0	1	0	1	0	0	0	X	3

Sheet D	1	2	3	4	5	6	7	8	9	10	Final
New Brunswick (Hanlon) 🔨	0	0	1	0	2	1	0	0	1	X	5
Newfoundland (Strong)	1	1	0	4	0	0	0	1	0	X	7

=== Draw 13 ===
Wednesday, February 23, 3:00 pm

Sheet A	1	2	3	4	5	6	7	8	9	10	Final
Alberta (Nedohin) 🔨	1	0	1	1	2	0	2	0	1	X	8
Canada (Jones)	0	2	0	0	0	0	0	2	0	X	4

Sheet B	1	2	3	4	5	6	7	8	9	10	Final
Nova Scotia (Zinck) 🔨	1	0	0	0	0	1	0	X	X	X	2
Manitoba (Laliberte)	0	2	1	1	1	0	3	X	X	X	8

Sheet C	1	2	3	4	5	6	7	8	9	10	Final
Newfoundland (Strong) 🔨	0	0	0	1	0	0	0	0	X	X	1
British Columbia (Law)	0	1	1	0	0	2	2	2	X	X	8

Sheet D	1	2	3	4	5	6	7	8	9	10	11	Final
Prince Edward Island (Bradley) 🔨	0	0	2	2	0	0	0	1	0	0	1	6
Yukon/Northwest Territories (Hatton)	0	0	0	0	1	1	2	0	0	1	0	5

=== Draw 14 ===
Wednesday, February 23, 7:30 pm

Sheet A	1	2	3	4	5	6	7	8	9	10	11	Final
Manitoba (Laliberte) 🔨	0	3	1	1	0	0	1	0	1	0	1	8
Quebec (Berthelot)	0	0	0	0	2	2	0	2	0	1	0	7

Sheet B	1	2	3	4	5	6	7	8	9	10	Final
Canada (Jones) 🔨	0	0	1	0	1	0	0	1	0	0	3
Saskatchewan (Campbell)	0	2	0	1	0	0	1	0	1	2	7

Sheet C	1	2	3	4	5	6	7	8	9	10	Final
Yukon/Northwest Territories (Hatton) 🔨	0	0	1	0	0	0	0	0	2	X	3
New Brunswick (Hanlon)	0	2	0	0	1	1	1	1	0	X	6

Sheet D	1	2	3	4	5	6	7	8	9	10	11	Final
British Columbia (Law) 🔨	0	0	1	0	1	0	1	1	0	2	0	6
Ontario (Merklinger)	1	1	0	1	0	2	0	0	1	0	1	7

=== Draw 15 ===
Thursday, February 24, 8:00 am

Sheet A	1	2	3	4	5	6	7	8	9	10	Final
Ontario (Merklinger) 🔨	2	0	0	0	0	1	1	0	2	2	8
Alberta (Nedohin)	0	2	2	1	0	0	0	1	0	0	6

Sheet B	1	2	3	4	5	6	7	8	9	10	11	Final
New Brunswick (Hanlon) 🔨	0	1	0	2	0	0	1	1	0	2	0	7
Manitoba (Laliberte)	1	0	2	0	2	1	0	0	1	0	1	8

Sheet C	1	2	3	4	5	6	7	8	9	10	11	Final
Nova Scotia (Zinck) 🔨	1	0	2	0	3	0	1	0	1	0	1	9
Newfoundland (Strong)	0	2	0	2	0	2	0	1	0	1	0	8

Sheet D	1	2	3	4	5	6	7	8	9	10	11	Final
Canada (Jones) 🔨	2	0	0	0	2	0	2	0	1	0	1	8
Yukon/Northwest Territories (Hatton)	0	0	1	1	0	2	0	1	0	2	0	7

=== Draw 16 ===
Thursday, February 24, 3:00 pm

Sheet A	1	2	3	4	5	6	7	8	9	10	Final
Newfoundland (Strong) 🔨	1	2	0	0	1	1	0	0	0	X	5
Canada (Jones)	0	0	0	1	0	0	2	1	3	X	7

Sheet B	1	2	3	4	5	6	7	8	9	10	Final
Yukon/Northwest Territories (Hatton) 🔨	1	0	1	0	0	0	1	0	2	0	5
Nova Scotia (Zinck)	0	3	0	1	1	1	0	0	0	1	7

Sheet C	1	2	3	4	5	6	7	8	9	10	Final
Quebec (Berthelot) 🔨	1	0	0	0	0	0	2	0	1	X	4
British Columbia (Law)	0	2	1	1	2	2	0	1	0	X	9

Sheet D	1	2	3	4	5	6	7	8	9	10	Final
Saskatchewan (Campbell) 🔨	1	1	1	0	1	0	1	0	0	X	5
Prince Edward Island (Bradley)	0	0	0	1	0	1	0	0	1	X	3

=== Draw 17 ===
Thursday, February 24, 7:30 pm

Sheet A	1	2	3	4	5	6	7	8	9	10	Final
British Columbia (Law) 🔨	0	2	0	0	2	0	2	0	4	X	10
Saskatchewan (Campbell)	0	0	0	1	0	1	0	1	0	X	3

Sheet B	1	2	3	4	5	6	7	8	9	10	Final
Prince Edward Island (Bradley) 🔨	1	0	4	1	0	0	1	0	1	0	8
Quebec (Berthelot)	0	4	0	0	1	1	0	2	0	2	10

Sheet C	1	2	3	4	5	6	7	8	9	10	Final
Manitoba (Laliberte) 🔨	0	0	2	0	1	1	0	1	0	0	5
Ontario (Merklinger)	1	1	0	0	0	0	2	0	1	1	6

Sheet D	1	2	3	4	5	6	7	8	9	10	Final
Alberta (Nedohin) 🔨	1	0	0	1	0	1	3	0	3	X	9
New Brunswick (Hanlon)	0	2	2	0	1	0	0	1	0	X	6

== Tiebreaker ==
Friday, February 25, 9:00 am

Sheet B	1	2	3	4	5	6	7	8	9	10	11	Final
British Columbia (Law) 🔨	0	0	0	1	0	1	0	3	0	0	2	7
Nova Scotia (Zinck)	0	0	0	0	2	0	1	0	1	1	0	5

Player percentages
British Columbia		Nova Scotia	
Diane Nelson	77%	Laine Peters	82%
Georgina Wheatcroft	82%	Krista Bernard	68%
Julie Skinner	83%	Heather Smith-Dacey	78%
Kelley Law	62%	Kay Zinck	84%
Total	81%	Total	78%

== Playoffs ==
Page playoffs
1	Ontario	6
2	Manitoba	4
3	Saskatchewan	4
4	British Columbia	8

Semifinal
2	Manitoba	6
4	British Columbia	7

Final
1	Ontario	4
4	British Columbia	9

=== 1 vs. 2 ===
Friday, February 25, 3:00 pm

Sheet C	1	2	3	4	5	6	7	8	9	10	Final
Manitoba (Laliberte)	0	1	0	0	1	0	2	0	0	X	4
Ontario (Merklinger) 🔨	1	0	1	1	0	2	0	0	1	X	6

Player percentages
Manitoba		Ontario	
Janet Arnott	90%	Audrey Frey	87%
Debbie Jones-Walker	73%	Patti McKnight	79%
Cathy Overton-Clapham	73%	Theresa Breen	86%
Connie Laliberte	76%	Anne Merklinger	81%
Total	78%	Total	83%

=== 3 vs. 4 ===
Friday, February 25, 7:30 pm

Sheet C	1	2	3	4	5	6	7	8	9	10	Final
Saskatchewan (Campbell) 🔨	0	1	0	1	0	0	0	2	0	X	4
British Columbia (Law)	0	0	1	0	2	1	1	0	3	X	8

Player percentages
Saskatchewan		British Columbia	
Leanne Whitrow	71%	Diane Nelson	91%
Karen Daku	63%	Georgina Wheatcroft	79%
Cathy Walter	80%	Julie Skinner	81%
June Campbell	63%	Kelley Law	78%
Total	69%	Total	82%

=== Semifinal ===
Saturday, February 26, 4:00 pm

Sheet C	1	2	3	4	5	6	7	8	9	10	Final
Manitoba (Laliberte) 🔨	1	0	0	2	0	0	0	3	0	0	6
British Columbia (Law)	0	1	1	0	1	0	1	0	2	1	7

Player percentages
Manitoba		British Columbia	
Janet Arnott	74%	Diane Nelson	71%
Debbie Jones-Walker	79%	Georgina Wheatcroft	78%
Cathy Overton-Clapham	80%	Julie Skinner	84%
Connie Laliberte	65%	Kelley Law	69%
Total	74%	Total	75%

=== Final ===
Sunday, February 27, 10:30 am

Sheet C	1	2	3	4	5	6	7	8	9	10	Final
British Columbia (Law)	0	1	0	1	2	0	3	1	1	X	9
Ontario (Merklinger) 🔨	1	0	1	0	0	2	0	0	0	X	4

Player percentages
British Columbia		Ontario	
Diane Nelson	75%	Audrey Frey	89%
Georgina Wheatcroft	76%	Patti McKnight	73%
Julie Skinner	81%	Theresa Breen	58%
Kelley Law	74%	Anne Merklinger	61%
Total	77%	Total	70%

== Statistics ==
=== Top 5 player percentages ===
Final Round Robin Percentages

Key
First All-Star Team
Second All-Star Team

Leads	%
(Canada) Nancy Delahunt	87
(Prince Edward Island) Tricia MacGregor	85
(Manitoba) Janet Arnott	85
(Ontario) Audrey Frey	82
(British Columbia) Diane Nelson	80
(Saskatchewan) Leanne Whitrow	80

Seconds	%
(Saskatchewan) Karen Daku	83
(Manitoba) Debbie Jones-Walker	81
(British Columbia) Georgina Wheatcroft	81
(Canada) Mary-Anne Waye	79
(Ontario) Patti McKnight	79

Thirds	%
(Canada) Kim Kelly	82
(Manitoba) Cathy Overton-Clapham	81
(Saskatchewan) Cathy Walter	81
(Ontario) Theresa Breen	81
(British Columbia) Julie Skinner	78

Skips	%
(Ontario) Anne Merklinger	79
(Manitoba) Connie Laliberte	79
(Saskatchewan) June Campbell	75
(Nova Scotia) Kay Zinck	75
(British Columbia) Kelley Law	75

== Awards ==
=== All-Star teams ===
First Team
Position	Name	Team
Skip	Connie Laliberte (2)	Manitoba
Third	Cathy Overton-Clapham	Manitoba
Second	Karen Daku	Saskatchewan
Lead	Tricia McGregor (2)	Prince Edward Island

Second Team
Position	Name	Team
Skip	Anne Merklinger (2)	Ontario
Third	Cathy Walter	Saskatchewan
Second	Debbie Jones-Walker	Manitoba
Lead	Nancy Delahunt	Canada

=== Marj Mitchell Sportsmanship Award ===
The Marj Mitchell Sportsmanship Award was presented to the player chosen by their fellow peers as the curler that most exemplified sportsmanship and dedication to curling during the annual Scotties Tournament of Hearts.

Name	Team	Position
Anne Merklinger (2)	Ontario	Skip

=== Most Valuable Player Award ===
The Most Valuable Player Award is presented to the curler chosen by TSN commentators for their outstanding play during the playoff round.

Name	Team	Position
Julie Skinner	British Columbia	Third

=== Ford Hot Shots ===
The Ford Hot Shots was a skills competition preceding the round robin of the tournament. Each competitor had to perform a series of shots with each shot scoring between 0 and 5 points depending on where the stone came to rest. The winner of this edition of the event would win a two-year lease on a Ford Taurus SE.

Winner	Runner-Up	Score
(British Columbia) Kelley Law	(Canada) Colleen Jones	22–13

=== Shot of the Week Award ===
The Shot of the Week Award was voted on by TSN commentators and presented to the curler who had been determined with the most outstanding shot during the championship.

Name	Team	Position
Julie Skinner	British Columbia	Third
