= 1991 World Women's Curling Championship =

- Host city: Winnipeg, Manitoba, Canada
- Arena: Winnipeg Arena
- Dates: March 23–31, 1991
- Winner: Norway
- Curling club: Snarøen CC, Oslo
- Skip: Dordi Nordby
- Third: Hanne Pettersen
- Second: Mette Halvorsen
- Lead: Anne Jøtun
- Alternate: Marianne Aspelin
- Finalist: Canada (Julie Skinner)

The 1991 World Women's Curling Championship (branded as 1991 Canada Safeway World Women's Curling Championship for sponsorship reasons) took place from March 23–31, 1991 at the Winnipeg Arena in Winnipeg, Manitoba, Canada.

== Teams ==
Austria	Canada	Denmark	France	Germany
Kitzbühl CC Skip: Edeltraud Koudelka; Third: Veronika Huber; Second: Anna Egger; Lead: Margit Holzer; Alternate: Lilly Hummelt	Juan de Fuca CC, Colwood Skip: Julie Sutton; Third: Jodie Sutton; Second: Melissa Soligo; Lead: Karri Willms; Alternate: Elaine Dagg-Jackson	Hvidovre CC Skip: Helena Blach; Third: Malene Krause; Second: Lone Kristoffersen; Lead: Gitte Larsen; Alternate: Lene Bidstrup	Megève CC Skip: Annick Mercier; Third: Catherine Lefebvre; Second: Brigitte Lamy; Lead: Claire Niatel; Alternate: Brigitte Collard	SC Riessersee, Garmisch-Partenkirchen Skip: Andrea Schöpp; Third: Monika Wagner; Second: Heike Schwaller; Lead: Christina Haller; Alternate: Barbara Haller
Norway	Scotland	Sweden	Switzerland	United States
Snarøen CC, Oslo Skip: Dordi Nordby; Third: Hanne Pettersen; Second: Mette Halvorsen; Lead: Anne Jøtun; Alternate: Marianne Aspelin	East Kilbride CC, Lanarkshire; Haremyres CC, Lanarkshire Skip: Christine Allison; Third: Claire Milne; Second: Mairi Milne; Lead: Margaret Richardson	Härnösands CK Skip: Anette Norberg; Third: Cathrine Norberg; Second: Anna Rindeskog; Lead: Helene Granqvist; Alternate: Ann-Catrin Kjerr	Zug CC Skip: Janet Hürlimann; Third: Claudia Bärtschi; Second: Jutta Tanner; Lead: Corinne Anneler	CC at Houston, Texas Skip: Maymar Gemmell; Third: Judy Johnston; Second: Janet Hunter; Lead: Brenda Jancic; Alternate: Susan Anschuetz

== Round-robin standings ==
Country	Skip	W	L
Norway	Dordi Nordby	8	1
Canada	Julie Sutton	7	2
Sweden	Anette Norberg	7	2
Scotland	Christine Allison	6	3
Germany	Andrea Schöpp	5	4
Denmark	Helena Blach	4	5
Switzerland	Janet Hürlimann	4	5
France	Annick Mercier	2	7
Austria	Edeltraud Koudelka	1	8
United States	Maymar Gemmell	1	8

== Round-robin results ==
=== Draw 1 ===
Sheet A	Final
Canada (Sutton)	12
France (Mercier)	5

Sheet B	Final
Switzerland (Hürlimann)	6
Norway (Nordby)	7

Sheet C	Final
Sweden (Norberg)	11
Austria (Koudelka)	3

Sheet D	Final
United States (Gemmell)	4
Germany (Schöpp)	8

Sheet E	Final
Scotland (Allison)	6
Denmark (Blach)	3

=== Draw 2 ===
Sheet A	Final
Germany (Schöpp)	6
Scotland (Allison)	8

Sheet B	Final
Austria (Koudelka)	2
Norway (Nordby)	6

Sheet C	Final
Switzerland (Hürlimann)	4
France (Mercier)	11

Sheet D	Final
Denmark (Blach)	6
Canada (Sutton)	7

Sheet E	Final
United States (Gemmell)	5
Sweden (Norberg)	9

=== Draw 3 ===
Sheet A	Final
Norway (Nordby)	7
Denmark (Blach)	1

Sheet B	Final
Germany (Schöpp)	8
France (Mercier)	3

Sheet C	Final
Scotland (Allison)	8
United States (Gemmell)	1

Sheet D	Final
Sweden (Norberg)	8
Switzerland (Hürlimann)	5

Sheet E	Final
Canada (Sutton)	9
Austria (Koudelka)	3

=== Draw 4 ===
Sheet A	Final
France (Mercier)	7
United States (Gemmell)	9

Sheet B	Final
Norway (Nordby)	5
Canada (Sutton)	8

Sheet C	Final
Switzerland (Hürlimann)	6
Scotland (Allison)	4

Sheet D	Final
Austria (Koudelka)	6
Denmark (Blach)	7

Sheet E	Final
Sweden (Norberg)	9
Germany (Schöpp)	8

=== Draw 5 ===
Sheet A	Final
Austria (Koudelka)	2
Switzerland (Hürlimann)	8

Sheet B	Final
Denmark (Blach)	9
United States (Gemmell)	4

Sheet C	Final
Canada (Sutton)	5
Germany (Schöpp)	4

Sheet D	Final
France (Mercier)	4
Sweden (Norberg)	9

Sheet E	Final
Scotland (Allison)	5
Norway (Nordby)	7

=== Draw 6 ===
Sheet A	Final
Denmark (Blach)	2
Germany (Schöpp)	7

Sheet B	Final
Norway (Nordby)	8
Sweden (Norberg)	6

Sheet C	Final
France (Mercier)	5
Scotland (Allison)	8

Sheet D	Final
United States (Gemmell)	8
Austria (Koudelka)	9

Sheet E	Final
Switzerland (Hürlimann)	6
Canada (Sutton)	8

=== Draw 7 ===
Sheet A	Final
Scotland (Allison)	6
Canada (Sutton)	3

Sheet B	Final
Sweden (Norberg)	8
Denmark (Blach)	2

Sheet C	Final
Austria (Koudelka)	2
France (Mercier)	8

Sheet D	Final
Switzerland (Hürlimann)	4
Germany (Schöpp)	9

Sheet E	Final
Norway (Nordby)	8
United States (Gemmell)	2

=== Draw 8 ===
Sheet A	Final
Scotland (Allison)	6
Canada (Sutton)	3

Sheet B	Final
Sweden (Norberg)	8
Denmark (Blach)	2

Sheet C	Final
Austria (Koudelka)	2
France (Mercier)	8

Sheet D	Final
Switzerland (Hürlimann)	4
Germany (Schöpp)	9

Sheet E	Final
Norway (Nordby)	8
United States (Gemmell)	2

=== Draw 9 ===
Sheet A	Final
United States (Gemmell)	5
Switzerland (Hürlimann)	9

Sheet B	Final
Austria (Koudelka)	5
Scotland (Allison)	7

Sheet C	Final
Germany (Schöpp)	5
Norway (Nordby)	6

Sheet D	Final
Canada (Sutton)	4
Sweden (Norberg)	9

Sheet E	Final
Denmark (Blach)	6
France (Mercier)	4

== Tiebreaker ==
Sheet A	Final
Switzerland (Hürlimann)	6
Denmark (Blach)	8

== Playoffs ==
Semi-final
2	Canada	6
3	Sweden	4
4	Scotland	4
1	Norway	8

Final
2	Canada	3
1	Norway	4

=== Final ===
Team	1	2	3	4	5	6	7	8	9	10	11	Final
Canada (Sutton)	0	0	0	2	0	0	0	0	0	1	0	3
Norway (Nordby)	0	2	0	0	1	0	0	0	0	0	1	4
