= Anne Merklinger =

Canadian curler

- Curler
- Other names: Anne Merklinger-Michie
- Born: November 15, 1958 (age 67); London, Ontario, Canada

Curling career
- Member Association: Prince Edward Island (1975-1976); Ontario (1989-2006)
- Hearts: 6 (1990, 1991, 1993, 1994, 1998, 2000)
- World Championship: 1 (1990)
Medal record
Women's swimming
Representing Canada
Summer Universiade
Silver medal – second place	1977 Sofia	200 m breaststroke
Curling
Representing Canada
World Championships
Bronze medal – third place	1990 Västerås	Team
Representing Ontario
Scotties Tournament of Hearts
Gold medal – first place	1990 Ottawa
Silver medal – second place	1998 Regina
Silver medal – second place	2000 Prince George
Bronze medal – third place	1993 Brandon

Anne Merklinger (born November 15, 1958) is CEO of Own the Podium. She is a Canadian retired curler. She won the Tournament of Hearts, the Canadian women's championship, in 1990 and went on to win the bronze medal at the World Championships. She curled out of the Rideau Curling Club.

Before curling, Merklinger was a notable swimmer. In the late 1970s, she was a member of the Canadian national swimming team.

Following her curling career, Merklinger served as director general of the Canoe Kayak Canada. She also worked with the Commission for the Inclusion of Athletes with a Disability and served as a board member for Special Olympics Canada. Merklinger was named CEO of the Own the Podium program on January 26, 2012, succeeding Alex Baumann and following an interim period as co-CEO.

== Curling career ==
In 1976, she skipped Prince Edward Island at the 1976 Canadian Junior Curling Championships.

After attending the 1990 and 1991 Tournament of Hearts as an alternate for Alison Goring, Merklinger skipped her first team to the Hearts in 1993. Her team lost to Maureen Bonar of Manitoba in the semi-final. Her team qualified for the Hearts once again the following year, but they failed to live up to expectations, finished with a 4–7 record.

Merklinger returned to the Hearts in 1998. Capping off a season that included her team attending the 1997 Canadian Olympic Trials, Merklinger would go all the way to the final before losing to Cathy Borst of Alberta in the final.

Merklinger attended her last Hearts in 2000 where she once again made it to the final. This time she lost to Kelley Law's team from British Columbia. Merklinger failed to qualify for any further Hearts after that. After the 2005–06 season, where her team failed to even make the provincial championships, she decided to retire from the game.

== Personal life ==
Merklinger comes from a large curling family. Her brother, Dave Merklinger is a high-profile ice maker, while her younger sisters Breanne and Lee are curlers as well. Her other brother, Bill was the alternate for the Northwest Territories at the 2015 Tim Hortons Brier.

== Awards ==
- Marj Mitchell Sportsmanship Award (1998)
- Scotties Tournament of Hearts Shot of the Week Award (1998)
- Ottawa Sports Hall of Fame (2010)
- Scotties Tournament of Hearts Builders Award (2010)
