= Marj Mitchell Sportsmanship Award =

Award in the Scotties Tournament of Hearts

- Sport: Curling
- Competition: Scotties Tournament of Hearts
- Awarded for: The player that most exemplified sportsmanship and dedication to curling during the annual Scotties Tournament of Hearts.

History
- First award: 1982
- First winner: (Ontario) Carol Thompson
- Most wins: (Saskatchewan) Sherry Anderson (4)
- Most recent: (Alberta) Kayla Skrlik

The Marj Mitchell Sportsmanship Award is the sportsmanship award at the annual Scotties Tournament of Hearts, held to crown the Canadian women's curling championship. When Scott Paper took over sponsorship of the Canadian Women's Curling Championship in 1982, they decided to present an annual award for sportsmanship. From 1982 to 1997, the award had a different name each year, as the convention was to name the annual award after an individual from the host region who exemplified sportsmanship and dedication to curling. In 1998, the decision was made to honour Marj Mitchell each year. Mitchell curled for Saskatchewan and captured the national and world championships in 1982. Mitchell died of cancer in 1983.

== Scotties Tournament of Hearts Sportsmanship Award winners prior to 1998 ==
Prior to 1998, the Sportsmanship award at the Scotties Tournament of Hearts was named after a notable individual in the curling community where the tournament was held that year.

Year	Player	Team	Award Name
1982	Carol Thompson	Ontario	Joyce McKee Award
1983	Penny LaRocque	Nova Scotia	Ina Hansen Award
1984	Yvonne Smith	Ontario	Elizabeth MacDonald Award
1985	Cathy Dillon	Prince Edward Island	Lura McLuckie Award
1986	Mabel Thompson	Alberta	Jo Wallace Award
1987	Kim Duck	Ontario	Myrna McQuarrie Award
1988	Mary Baird	Nova Scotia	Caroline Ball Award
1989	Heidi Hanlon	New Brunswick	Sylvia Fedoruk Award
1990	Jackie-Rae Greening	Alberta	Lee Tobin Award
1991	Alison Goring	Canada	Vera Pezer Award
1992	Heidi Hanlon	New Brunswick	Joyce Myers Award
1993	Laurie Allen	Canada	Mabel Mitchell Award
1994	Patti McKnight	Ontario	Effie Hezzelwood Award
1995	Alison Goring	Ontario	Bob Stewart Award
1996	Stephanie Marchand	Quebec	Arline Wilson Award
1997	Alison Goring	Ontario	Diana Doe Award

== Winners of the Marj Mitchell Sportsmanship Award ==
Starting in 1998, the Sportsmanship Award at the annual Scotties Tournament of Hearts was permanently renamed the Marj Mitchell Sportsmanship Award in honour of Mitchell, a Saskatchewan curler who died of cancer in 1983.

Year	Player	Team
1998	Anne Merklinger	Ontario
1999	Jane Arseneau	New Brunswick
2000	Anne Merklinger	Ontario
2001	Jane Arseneau	New Brunswick
2002	Meredith Doyle	Nova Scotia
2003	Anne Dunn	Ontario
2004	Sherry Anderson	Saskatchewan
2005	Stefanie Richard	Prince Edward Island
2006	Kelly Scott	British Columbia
2007	Stefanie Clark	Prince Edward Island
2008	Stefanie Clark	Prince Edward Island
2009	Cori Bartel	Alberta
2010	Kelly Scott	British Columbia
2011	Cathy Overton-Clapham	Manitoba
2012	Amanda Gates	Ontario
2013	Sasha Carter	British Columbia
2014	Sherry Anderson	Saskatchewan
2015	Sherry Anderson	Saskatchewan
2016	Ashley Howard	Saskatchewan
2017	Kerry Galusha	Northwest Territories
2018	Sherry Anderson	Saskatchewan
2019	Sarah Potts	Northern Ontario
2020	Rachelle Brown	Canada
2021	Laurie St-Georges	Quebec
2022	Karlee Everist	Nova Scotia
2023	Kerry Galusha	Northwest Territories
2024	Danielle Inglis	Ontario (Inglis)
2025	Nancy Martin	Saskatchewan
2026	Kayla Skrlik	Alberta (Skrlik)
