= Julie Skinner =

Canadian curler and Olympic medallist

- Curler ♀
- Other names: Julie Lynn Skinner
- Born: Julie Lynn Sutton; April 23, 1968 (age 58); Calgary, Alberta, Canada

Curling career
- Hearts: 7 (1989, 1991, 1992, 1993, 2000, 2001, 2004)
- World Championship: 2 (1991, 2000)
- Olympic: 2 (1992, 2002)
Medal record
Women's curling
Representing Canada
Olympic Games
Bronze medal – third place	1992 Albertville (demonstration)
Bronze medal – third place	2002 Salt Lake City
World Curling Championships
Gold medal – first place	2000 Glasgow
Silver medal – second place	1991 Winnipeg
World Junior Curling Championships
Gold medal – first place	1988 Chamonix
Representing British Columbia
Scotties Tournament of Hearts
Gold medal – first place	2000 Prince George
Gold medal – first place	1991 Saskatoon
Silver medal – second place	2001 Sudbury
Silver medal – second place	1992 Halifax

Julie Lynn Skinner (née Sutton, born April 23, 1968, in Calgary, Alberta) is a Canadian retired curler and Olympic medallist from Victoria, British Columbia. She received a bronze medal at the 2002 Winter Olympics in Salt Lake City. She is also a former world champion from 2000.

After winning the 1987 Canadian Junior Curling Championships, Skinner became the junior world champion in 1988, as skip for the Canadian team. She also won the 1986 Canadian Junior Women's Curling Championship playing third for her sister Jodie Sutton.

== Personal life ==
At the time of her World junior championship title, Skinner was a student at the University of Victoria and was from Oliver, British Columbia. She is the twin sister of her teammate Jodie Sutton.
