= Ontario Women's Curling Championship =

Curling championship

- Established: 1956
- 2026 host city: Elmira, Ontario
- 2026 arena: Woolwich Memorial Centre
- 2026 champion: Hailey Armstrong

Current edition
- 2026 Ontario Women's Curling Championship

The Ontario Women's Curling Championship, formerly the Ontario Scotties Tournament of Hearts is the Southern Ontario provincial curling championship for women's curling. The tournament is run by Curling Ontario, the curling association for Southern Ontario. The winning team represents Team Ontario at the national Scotties Tournament of Hearts.

== History ==
The first women's provincial championship occurred in 1956 in North Bay, and was known as the "all-Ontario ladies' curling championship". It pitted the winners of three regional women's curling associations (the Ontario Ladies' Curling Association, covering Southern Ontario, the Northern Ontario Curling Association, covering Northeastern Ontario and the Western Ontario Ladies' Curling Association, covering Northwestern Ontario) against each other in a two-day, double round-robin series.

In 1960, the tournament expanded to four teams, with the winner from Eastern Ontario added to the event, and was reduced to a single round robin. The winner represented Ontario at the Eastern Canadian Championship that year. Each provincial tournament in Eastern Canada would be referred to as "Dominion Silver 'D' competitions, after the Dominion supermarket chain became a sponsor. The tournament went back to a double round robin the following year (with four teams), with the winner going on to represent Ontario at the first official national championships, the 1961 Diamond D Championship. After a Quebec team from Noranda qualified as the Northern Ontario representative in the 1963 championship, the Ontario Ladies Curling Association voted to limit the event to just Ontario teams going forward. In 1964, the field was expanded to six teams, with the addition of two more Southern Ontario qualifiers. Due to a governing body dispute, Southern Ontario teams were barred from the 1968 tournament, leaving just three entries (Eastern Ontario, Northern Ontario and North-Western Ontario) to play a double round robin. The event remained a three-team event until 1972 after the dispute with the Southern Ontario Ladies Curling Association was resolved in 1971. The three Southern Ontario teams were added back, making the event a six team, single round robin event once again. This six team round robin format lasted until 1987, when the field was expanded to a ten team round robin. During this time, the event was known as the Ontario Lassies from c. 1975 to 1982 following the sponsorship of Macdonald Tobacco, and then as the Ontario Scott Tournament of Hearts in 1982, following the sponsorship of Scott Paper.

Until 1991, the team with the best round robin record won the provincial championship. In 1991, a three-team playoff was introduced, with the top team earning a bye to the final. A page playoff was added in 2003, which involved adding a fourth playoff team. The event was re-named the Ontario Scotties Tournament of Hearts in 2007 when Scott Paper was sold to Kruger Inc.

In 2015, Northern Ontario earned its own direct entry to the national Scotties Tournament of Hearts, and so the Ontario Hearts would thus be a championship for teams from Southern Ontario only. The event remained a ten team event with a four team page playoff until 2017, when it was reduced to eight teams with a three team playoff. In 2018, the event adopted a 12 team triple knockout format for the first time, followed by a page playoff. In 2019, it returned to eight teams with a three team playoff. A last minute decision by CurlON added a ninth team for the 2020 event. The 2021 event was cancelled for the first time, due to the COVID-19 pandemic in Ontario. CurlON appointed a team to represent the province at that year's Hearts. The 2022 event was suspended due to the new provincial regulations caused by the Omicron variant of COVID-19, and CurlON appointed a team again for the second straight year. An eight-team provincial championship was still held in 2022, but in April that year, well after the national championship, with the winner earning a bye to the 2023 provincial championship. In 2023, the event was expanded to twelve teams.

After 2024, Kreuger Inc. stopped sponsoring all provincial and territorial women's championships, and the event was subsequently renamed the Ontario Women's Curling Championship in 2025.

== Champions ==
National champions are indicated in bold. Teams from Northern Ontario are indicated in italics, as prior to 2015, Northern Ontario did not have their own provincial championship. National champions get an automatic bye into the following years' national championships, so they cannot defend their provincial championship. A national championship has been held since 1961, although the provincial women's championship has been held since 1956.

=== 1956–1990 ===
Hearts	Winning team	Winning club	City	Hearts rec.	Host site
1956	Emily Woolley, Dardie Smith, Mrs. H. J. (Note: Probably Kathleen (née Locke)) Coon, Jane Clark	Toronto Granite Club	Toronto	n/a	North Bay
1957	Edna Teskey, Jean Beardsley, Veryl Finlay, Anne Trussler	Kitchener-Waterloo Granite Club	Kitchener	n/a	Toronto
1958	Edna Johnston, Lyne Beave, Marnie Brunton, Edith Ross	Sudbury Granite Club	Sudbury	n/a	Port Arthur
1959	Emily Woolley, Barbara Gibson, Jane Clark, Mary Mills	Toronto Granite Club	Toronto	n/a	Sudbury
1960	Elsie Forsyth, Helen Morgan, Anne Brown, Ina Oikonen	Fort William Curling Club	Fort William	3—1 (E. Can)	Peterborough
1961	Emily Woolley, Dardie Smith, Barbara Gibson, Jane Clark	Toronto Granite Club	Toronto	5–4	Fort William
1962	Fern Irwin, Jane Hanna, Erva Law, Ethel Garland	St. George's Golf & Country Club	Islington, Etobicoke	4–5	Toronto
1963	Emily Woolley, Dardie Smith, Jane Clark, Mary Mills	Toronto Granite Club	Toronto	7–3	North Bay
1964	Helen Hanright, Lyllis Fulton, Lousie Denny, Russ Manning	RCN Curling Club	Ottawa	5–4	Cornwall
1965	Fern Irwin, Regina Johnson, Erva Law, Fern MacDonald	Dixie Curling Club	Cooksville	5–4	Port Arthur
1966	June Shaw, Shirley Wiebe, Dorothy Holmgren, Joan LeCain	Kenora Curling Club	Kenora	5–4	Dundas
1967	June Shaw, Shirley Wiebe, Dorothy Holmgren, Joan LeCain	Kenora Curling Club	Kenora	5–4	Copper Cliff
1968	Peggy Wherrett, Shirley Lake, Doreen McKay, Audrey Tew	Dryden Curling Club	Dryden	3–6	Kingston
1969	June Shaw, Shirley Wiebe, Faye Devins, Dorothy Holmgren	Kenora Curling Club	Kenora	7–2	Sault Ste. Marie
1970	Kay O'Neill, Thelma Graves, Shirley Keeley, Doreen Main	Kingston Curling Club	Kingston	6–3	Terrace Bay
1971	Helen Sillman, Norma Knudsen, Elaine Tetley, Marilyn Walker	Thunder Bay Curling Club	Thunder Bay	5–4	Arnprior
1972	Helen Sillman, Norma Knudsen, Marilyn Walker, Elaine Tetley	Thunder Bay Curling Club	Thunder Bay	2–7	Schumacher
1973	Isobel Munro, Thelma Lindsay, Geraldine Macklem, Vyvienne Johnston	Arnprior Curling Club	Arnprior	6–3	Thunder Bay
1974	Dawn Ventura, Alma Millikin, Sharon Skinner, Joyce Potter	RA Centre	Ottawa	6–3	Hamilton
1975	Bea Cole, Brenda Essery, Jane Chalmers, Deanne Buchan	Ivanhoe Curling Club	London	3–6	Arnprior
1976	Dawn Ventura, Cathy Craig, Lorie Mackie, Rhea Pilon	RA Centre	Ottawa	6–3	Sudbury
1977	Nini Mutch, Wyn Hushagen, Doris McKenzie, Rosina Lewicke, Sheila MacIsaac	Humber Highland Curling Club	Etobicoke	8–2	Barrie
1978	Sheila Seltzer, Louise Davison, Jane Chalmers, Marlene Linton	Forest City Curling Club	London	5–5	Woodbridge
1979	Pat Reid, Sandi Morton, Carmel O'Malley, Linda Stoyka	Boulevard Club	Toronto	3–7	Ottawa
1980	Christine Bodogh, Marilyn Darte, Norma Quesnell, Mary Gellard	St. Catharines Golf & Country Club	St. Catharines	7–5	North Bay
1981	Sheila Seltzer, Brenda Buchanan, Marcia Poulin, Beth Dykalski	Sudbury Curling Club	Sudbury	6–4	Thunder Bay
1982	Carol Thompson, Lynn Reynolds, Lindy Marchuk, Wendy Inouye	Royal Canadian Curling Club	Toronto	6–4	St. Thomas
1983	Anne Provo, Lorraine Lang, Marlene Delorenzi, Valerie Adams	Fort William Curling Club	Thunder Bay	4–6	Kingston
1984	Jill Greenwood, Yvonne Smith, Cynthia Kane, Fran Gareau	Humber Highland Curling Club	Etobicoke	5–5	Sault Ste. Marie
1985	Pam Leavitt, Susan Bell, Beverly Mainwaring, Debbie Brosseau	Roseland Curling Club	Windsor	3–7	Dryden
**1986**	**Marilyn Darte, Kathy McEdwards, Christine Jurgenson, Jan Augustyn**	**St. Catharines Curling Club**	**St. Catharines**	**11–1**	Ottawa
1987	Carol Thompson, Anne Dunn, Kimberley Duck, Lindy Crawford	Royal Canadian Curling Club	Toronto	6–5	Toronto
**1988**	**Heather Houston, Lorraine Lang, Diane Adams, Tracy Kennedy**	**Lakehead Curling Club**	**Thunder Bay**	**10–5**	Sudbury
1989	Jill Greenwood, Yvonne Smith, Carol Davis, Fran Gareau	Humber Highland Curling Club	Etobicoke	4–7	Nipigon
**1990**	**Alison Goring, Kristin Turcotte, Andrea Lawes, Cheryl McPherson**	**Bayview Curling Club**	**Thornhill**	**9–4**	Brampton

=== 1991–present ===
A playoff was added in 1991. Runners up from Northern Ontario in italics.

Hearts	Winning team	Winning club	City	Hearts rec.	Host site	Runner up skip (Club)
1991	Heather Houston, Lorraine Lang, Diane Adams, Diane Pushkar	Fort William Curling Club	Thunder Bay	8–5	Ottawa	Marilyn Bodogh (St. Catharines)
1992	Kim Clark, Tracy Kennedy, Patty Wilson, Peggy Barrette	Port Arthur Curling Club	Thunder Bay	4–7	Timmins	Marilyn Bodogh (St. Catharines)
1993	Anne Merklinger, Theresa Breen, Patti McKnight, Audrey Frey	Rideau Curling Club	Ottawa	7–5	Thunder Bay	Alison Goring (Bayview)
1994	Anne Merklinger, Theresa Breen, Patti McKnight, Audrey Frey	Rideau Curling Club	Ottawa	4–7	Ottawa	Marilyn Bodogh (St. Catharines)
1995	Alison Goring, Christine McCrady, Diane McLean, Mary Bowman	Bayview Curling Club	Thornhill	7–4	Brantford	Heather Houston (Thunder Bay)
**1996**	**Marilyn Bodogh, Kim Gellard, Corie Beveridge, Jane Hooper-Perroud**	**St. Catharines Curling Club**	St. Catharines	**11–3**	Sault Ste. Marie	Anne Merklinger (Rideau)
1997	Alison Goring, Lori Eddy, Kim Moore, Mary Bowman	Bayview Curling Club	Thornhill	8–6	Peterborough	Heather Houston (Thunder Bay)
1998	Anne Merklinger, Theresa Breen, Patti McKnight, Audrey Frey	Rideau Curling Club	Ottawa	9–5	Kenora	Heather Houston (Thunder Bay)
1999	Kim Gellard, Sherry Scheirich, Sally Karam, Allison Ross	Unionville Curling Club	Unionville	4–7	Niagara Falls	Janet Brown (Sutton)
2000; Details	Anne Merklinger, Theresa Breen, Patti McKnight, Audrey Frey	Rideau Curling Club	Ottawa	11–2	Timmins	Darcie Simpson (Rideau)
2001; Details	Sherry Middaugh, Janet Brown, Andrea Lawes, Sheri Cordina	Coldwater & District Curling Club	Coldwater	9–5	Kingston	Anne Merklinger (Rideau)
2002; Details	Sherry Middaugh, Janet Brown, Andrea Lawes, Sheri Cordina	Coldwater & District Curling Club	Coldwater	9–4	Thunder Bay	Darcie Simpson (Rideau)
2003; Details	Anne Dunn, Lindy Marchuk, Gloria Campbell, Fran Todd	Galt Country Club	Cambridge	5–6	Mississauga	Darcie Simpson (Rideau)
2004; Details	Sherry Middaugh, Kirsten Wall, Andrea Lawes, Sheri Cordina	Coldwater & District Curling Club	Coldwater	8–5	Copper Cliff	Elaine Uhryn (Soo)
2005; Details	Jenn Hanna, Pascale Letendre, Dawn Askin, Stephanie Hanna	Ottawa Curling Club	Ottawa	10–6	Ottawa	Krista Scharf (Fort William)
2006; Details	Krista Scharf, Tara George, Tiffany Stubbings, Lorraine Lang	Fort William Curling Club	Thunder Bay	4–7	Fort Frances	Janet McGhee (Uxbridge)
2007; Details	Krista Scharf, Tara George, Tiffany Stubbings, Lorraine Lang	Fort William Curling Club	Thunder Bay	6–6	Mississauga	Sherry Middaugh (Coldwater)
2008; Details	Sherry Middaugh, Kirsten Wall, Kim Moore, Andra Harmark	Coldwater & District Curling Club	Coldwater	9–4	Espanola	Krista McCarville (Fort William)
2009; Details	Krista McCarville, Tara George, Kari MacLean, Lorraine Lang	Fort William Curling Club	Thunder Bay	6–5	Oakville	Alison Goring (Bayview)
2010; Details	Krista McCarville, Tara George, Ashley Miharija, Kari MacLean	Fort William Curling Club	Thunder Bay	9–5	Thunder Bay	Tracy Horgan (Idylwylde)
2011; Details	Rachel Homan, Emma Miskew, Alison Kreviazuk, Lisa Weagle	Ottawa Curling Club	Ottawa	8–3	Thornhill	Krista McCarville (Fort William)
2012; Details	Tracy Horgan, Jennifer Seabrook, Jenna Enge, Amanda Gates	Idylwylde Golf & Country Club	Sudbury	4–7	Kenora	Rachel Homan (Ottawa)
**2013**; Details	**Rachel Homan, Emma Miskew, Alison Kreviazuk, Lisa Weagle**	**Ottawa Curling Club**	**Ottawa**	**12–1**	Waterloo	Cathy Auld (Mississaugua)
2014; Details	Allison Flaxey, Katie Cottrill, Lynn Kreviazuk, Morgan Court	Listowel Curling Club	Listowel	3–8	Sault Ste. Marie	Julie Hastings (Bayview)
2015; Details	Julie Hastings, Christy Trombley, Stacey Smith, Katrina Collins	Bayview Country Club	Thornhill	5–6	Penetanguishene	Sherry Middaugh (Coldwater)
2016; Details	Jenn Hanna, Brit O'Neill, Stephanie Hanna, Karen Sagle	Ottawa Curling Club	Ottawa	6–5	Brampton	Rachel Homan (Ottawa)
**2017**; Details	**Rachel Homan, Emma Miskew, Joanne Courtney, Lisa Weagle**	**Ottawa Curling Club**	**Ottawa**	**12–2**	Cobourg	Jacqueline Harrison (Mississaugua)
2018; Details	Hollie Duncan, Stephanie LeDrew, Cheryl Kreviazuk, Karen Sagle	Royal Canadian Curling Club	Toronto	5–7	Whitby	Danielle Inglis (Dixie)
2019; Details	Rachel Homan, Emma Miskew, Joanne Courtney, Lisa Weagle	Ottawa Curling Club	Ottawa	10–4	Elmira	Julie Tippin (Woodstock)
2020; Details	Rachel Homan, Emma Miskew, Joanne Courtney, Lisa Weagle	Ottawa Curling Club	Ottawa	11–3	Cornwall	Hollie Duncan (Royals)
2021	Cancelled due to the COVID-19 pandemic in Ontario. Team Homan (Rachel Homan, Emma Miskew, Sarah Wilkes, Joanne Courtney) represented Ontario at Scotties.			10–3	N/A	N/A
2022; Details	Rachel Homan, Emma Miskew, Sarah Wilkes, Joanne Courtney; Team Duncan (Hollie Duncan, Megan Balsdon, Rachelle Strybosch, Tess Bobbie) represented Ontario at Scotties	Ottawa Curling Club	Ottawa	4–4 (Team Duncan)	Thornhill	Carly Howard (Mississaugua)
2023; Details	Rachel Homan (Fourth), Tracy Fleury (Skip), Emma Miskew, Sarah Wilkes	Ottawa Curling Club	Ottawa	6–3	Port Elgin	Hollie Duncan (Woodstock)
2024; Details	Danielle Inglis, Kira Brunton, Calissa Daly, Cassandra de Groot	Ottawa Hunt and Golf Club	Ottawa	3–5	Dorchester	Carly Howard (High Park)
2025; Details	Danielle Inglis, Kira Brunton, Calissa Daly, Cassandra de Groot	Ottawa Hunt and Golf Club	Ottawa	6–3	Cobourg	Chelsea Brandwood (Niagara Falls)
2026; Details	Hailey Armstrong, Grace Lloyd, Michaela Robert, Rachel Steele	Whitby Curling Club	Whitby	5–3	Elmira	Danielle Inglis (Ottawa Hunt)

== Other Ontario teams at the Hearts ==
Beginning in 1986, the national Tournament of Hearts champion automatically earned a berth for the following years' national championship as "Team Canada". The first Ontario team to play as "Team Canada" at the Hearts was Marilyn Darte in 1987. Northern Ontario was granted their own team in 2015 (see Northern Ontario Scotties Tournament of Hearts). A Wildcard entry was added in 2018, which was expanded to three entries in 2021. Two of these entries became prequalifying entries in 2024.

Hearts	Team name	Team members	Club	City	Hearts rec.
1987	Team Canada	Marilyn Darte, Kathy McEdwards, Chris Jurgenson, Jan Augustyn	St. Catharines Curling Club	St. Catharines	4–7
1989	Team Canada	Heather Houston, Lorraine Lang, Diane Adams, Tracy Kennedy	Lakehead Ladies Curling Club	Thunder Bay	10–4
1990	Team Canada	Heather Houston, Lorraine Lang, Diane Adams, Tracy Kennedy	Fort William Curling Club	Thunder Bay	7–5
1991	Team Canada	Alison Goring, Kristin Turcotte, Andrea Lawes, Cheryl McPherson	Bayview Golf and Curling Club	Thornhill	7–6
1997	Team Canada	Marilyn Bodogh, Kim Gellard, Corie Beveridge, Jane Hooper Perroud	St. Catharines Curling Club	St. Catharines	5–6
2014	Team Canada	Rachel Homan, Emma Miskew, Alison Kreviazuk, Lisa Weagle	Ottawa Curling Club	Ottawa	13–0
2015	Team Canada	Rachel Homan, Emma Miskew, Joanne Courtney, Lisa Weagle	Ottawa Curling Club	Ottawa	8–5
2022	Wild Card #3	Emma Miskew, Sarah Wilkes, Allison Flaxey, Joanne Courtney	Ottawa Curling Club	Ottawa	4–4
2024	Ontario–Homan	Rachel Homan, Tracy Fleury, Emma Miskew, Sarah Wilkes	Ottawa Curling Club	Ottawa	11–0
2025	Team Canada	Rachel Homan, Tracy Fleury, Emma Miskew, Sarah Wilkes	Ottawa Curling Club	Ottawa	11–0
