= Gloria Taylor (curler) =

Canadian curler

- Curler

Team
- Curling club: Lakehead Ladies CC, Thunder Bay, ON, Fort William CC, Thunder Bay, ON, Port Arthur CC, Thunder Bay, ON

Curling career
- Member Association: Ontario
- Hearts: 4 (1988, 1989, 1990)
- World Championship: 1 (1989)
Medal record
Curling
Representing Canada
World Championships
Gold medal – first place	1989 Milwaukee
Representing Ontario
Scotties Tournament of Hearts
Gold medal – first place	1988 Fredericton
Gold medal – first place	1989 Kelowna
Bronze medal – third place	1990 Ottawa

Gloria Taylor (died c. 2013) was a Canadian curler.

She was a 1989 World women's champion and a two-time Canadian women's champion (1988, 1989).

== Awards ==
- Northwest Ontario Sports Hall of Fame: 1994 (with all of the Heather Houston 1988 and 1989 winning team)

== Teams and events ==
Season	Skip	Third	Second	Lead	Alternate	Events
1987–88	Heather Houston	Lorraine Lang	Diane Adams	Tracy Kennedy	Gloria Taylor	STOH 1988 (gold)
1988–89	Heather Houston	Lorraine Lang	Diane Adams	Tracy Kennedy	Gloria Taylor	STOH 1989 (gold); WCC 1989 (gold)
1989–90	Heather Houston	Lorraine Lang	Diane Adams	Tracy Kennedy	Gloria Taylor	STOH 1990 (bronze)
