= 2000 Ontario Scott Tournament of Hearts =

Canadian women's curling championship

- Host city: Timmins (Schumacher)
- Arena: McIntyre Curling Club
- Dates: January 25–29, 2000
- Winner: Team Merklinger
- Curling club: Rideau Curling Club, Ottawa
- Skip: Anne Merklinger
- Third: Theresa Breen
- Second: Patti McKnight
- Lead: Audrey Frey
- Finalist: Darcie Simpson (Rideau)

The 2000 Ontario Scott Tournament of Hearts, the provincial women's curling championship of Ontario was held January 25 to 29 at the McIntyre Curling Club in Timmins, Ontario. The Anne Merklinger rink from Ottawa won the event. She and her rink of Theresa Breen, Patti McKnight and Audrey Frey would go on to represent Ontario at the 2000 Scott Tournament of Hearts, Canada's national women's curling championship.

The final pitted two teams from Ottawa's Rideau Curling Club against each other, Anne Merklinger against Darcie Simpson (with team mates Margaret McLaughlin, Kelli Andrews and Linda Fulton). Simpson was wide on a takeout in the second end, resulting in a steal of three for Merklinger, which gave Merklinger a 4–0 lead. They did not look back, winning the game 8–2, with Simpson conceding after seven ends. It was Merklinger's fourth provincial title. There were about 500 fans on hand to witness the game.

Simpson made it to the final by defeating Colleen Madonia from the North Halton Curling Club and her team mates Lindsay Downer, Kim Bradley and Debbie Rauter, 6–4 in the semifinal. Madonia got into time trouble in the game, forcing her to "sprint through the final two ends." Simpson had a simple hit and stick on her last stone to win the game.

== Qualification process ==
Qualification method	Berths	Qualifying team(s)
Southern Ontario	4	Colleen Madonia; Anne Merklinger; Darcie Simpson; Janet Brown
Northern Ontario	2	Darla Esch; Linda Chyc
Northwestern Ontario	2	Lorraine Lang; Kathie Jackson
West Challenge Round	1	Melanie Palmer
East Challenge Round	1	Cheryl McPherson

== Standings ==
Final standings

Key
Teams to Playoffs
Teams to Tiebreakers

Skip (club)	W	L
Anne Merklinger (Rideau)	8	1
Darcie Simpson (Rideau)	7	2
Colleen Madonia (North Halton)	6	3
Melanie Palmer (Ilderton)	6	3
Janet Brown (Sutton)	6	3
Cheryl McPherson (Bayview)	4	5
Lorraine Lang (Fort William)	3	6
Darla Esch (North Bay)	3	6
Kathie Jackson (Fort Frances)	2	7
Linda Chyc (Sault Ste. Marie)	0	9

== Scores ==
=== January 25 ===
Draw 1

- Merklinger 9, Chyc 1
- McPherson 6, Madonia 5
- Esch 9, Jackson 8
- Simpson 9, Brown 5
- Palmer 7, Lang 6

Draw 2

- Palmer 7, McPherson 4
- Merklinger 10, Esch 2
- Brown 9, Chyc 5
- Madonia 9, Lang 6
- Simpson 6, Jackson 5

=== January 26 ===
Draw 3

- Madonia 9, Jackson 7
- Brown 8, Lang 4
- Merklinger 9, Simpson 4
- Palmer 8, Esch 4
- McPherson 9, Chyc 5

Draw 4

- Merklinger 8, Brown 5
- Jackson 13, McPherson 9
- Palmer 7, Madonia 6
- Simpson 8, Chyc 5
- Esch 6, Lang 5

Draw 5

- Esch 11, Chyc 5
- Simpson 9, Palmer 8
- McPherson 9, Lang 5
- Merklinger 10, Madonia 7
- Brown 9, Jackson 0

=== January 27 ===
Draw 6

- Simpson 9, Lang 5
- Jackson 7, Chyc 5
- Madonia 9, Brown 4
- McPherson 7, Esch 4
- Merklinger 7, Palmer 5

Draw 7

- Brown 9, McPherson 1
- Lang 7, Merklinger 4
- Simpson 8, Esch 5
- Palmer 11, Jackson 9
- Madonia 10, Chyc 2

=== January 28 ===
Draw 8

- Madonia 10, Esch 2
- Brown 7, Palmer 5
- Merklinger 8, Jackson 1
- Lang 10, Chyc 2
- Simpson 8, McPherson 6

Draw 9

- Lang 4, Jackson 3
- Madonia 6, Simpson 5
- Palmer 8, Chyc 5
- Merklinger 7, McPherson 4
- Brown 8, Esch 7

== Tie breakers ==
January 28

- Palmer 7, Brown 5

January 29

- Madonia 7, Palmer 5

== Playoffs ==
Semifinal			Final
			1	Anne Merklinger	8
2	Darcie Simpson	6	2	Darcie Simpson	2
3	Colleen Madonia	4

=== Semifinal ===
January 29

Team	1	2	3	4	5	6	7	8	9	10	Final
Darcie Simpson	0	1	0	0	2	0	1	0	0	2	6
Colleen Madonia	0	0	0	1	0	1	2	0	0	0	4

=== Final ===
January 29

Team	1	2	3	4	5	6	7	8	9	10	Final
Anne Merklinger	1	3	0	0	2	0	2	X	X	X	8
Darcie Simpson	0	0	1	0	0	1	0	X	X	X	2
