= Michelle Englot =

Canadian curler

- Curler
- Born: Michelle Englot; January 22, 1964 (age 62); Montmartre, Saskatchewan

Team
- Curling club: Highland CC, Regina, SK
- Mixed doubles partner: Derek Schneider

Curling career
- Member Association: Saskatchewan (1983-2016; 2019-present); Manitoba (2016-2018)
- Hearts: 10 (1987, 1988, 1989, 1990, 1992, 2001, 2008, 2012, 2017, 2018)
- Top CTRS ranking: 6th (2016-17)
- Grand Slam victories: 1 (Manitoba Lotteries, 2008)
Medal record
Women's curling
Scott Tournament of Hearts
Representing Saskatchewan
Bronze medal – third place	1988 Fredericton
Bronze medal – third place	1989 Kelowna
Representing Manitoba
Silver medal – second place	2017 St Catharines

Michelle Jennet Englot (born January 22, 1964 in Montmartre, Saskatchewan; formerly known as Michelle Ridgway and Michelle Schneider); is a Canadian curler from Regina, Saskatchewan. She is a nine-time provincial champion skip.

== Career ==
Englot started curling at age twelve, and represented Saskatchewan at the 1983 Canada Winter Games, and at the 1983 Canadian Junior Women's Curling Championship.

Englot won her first Saskatchewan Scott Tournament of Hearts provincial championship in 1988, she defeated Kathy Fahlman 10–0 in the final. This qualified Englot for her first Tournament of Hearts national championship. At the 1988 Scott Tournament of Hearts, she finished with a 9–2 record, but lost in the semi-final to Heather Houston of Ontario. In 1989, she won a second straight Saskatchewan Hearts title, toppling Sherry Anderson in the final, 7–6. At the 1989 Scott Tournament of Hearts, Englot finished with an 8–3 record. She once again lost to Houston in the semi-final, this time with Houston representing Team Canada as defending champions. She won her third straight provincial championship in 1990, defeating Kim Armbruster (Hodson) in the final, 5–4. At the 1990 Scott Tournament of Hearts, she failed to make the playoffs at the Hearts, finishing the round robin with a 6–5 record. Englot won the 1992 Saskatchewan Scott Tournament of Hearts, defeating Sandra Peterson (Schmirler) 8–5 in the final. At the 1992 Scott Tournament of Hearts, she finished 4th with a 7–4 record, narrowly missing the 3 team playoff.

Englot didn't return to the Hearts until 2001, due to the emergence of many other great teams from Saskatchewan such as Sandra Schmirler and Sherry Anderson. At the 2001 Scott Tournament of Hearts she was no longer a favourite, and she finished 4–7. Englot played at the 2001 Canadian Olympic Curling Trials, and finished with a 5–4 record, just out of the playoffs.

In 2004, Englot played third for Randy Gilewich at the 2004 Canadian Mixed Curling Championship, the team finished with a 5–6 record.

Englot returned once again to the Hearts in 2008. Englot played through adversity, having lost her father immediately before the tournament began. As a mark of respect all the teams wore green ribbons. (Green is the provincial colour of Saskatchewan). She finished with a respectable 5–6 record in front of a home town crowd.

Englot went 0–3 at the 2009 Olympic Pre-Trials, eliminating her from qualifying for the main event.

Englot would once again represent Saskatchewan at the 2012 Scotties Tournament of Hearts, where her team finished round robin play with a 5–6 record. In Draw 17, Englot defeated the defending champions, and fellow Saskatchewan curler, Amber Holland, handing her a fifth loss and eliminating her from the playoffs.

Englot finally made her first Scotties final in 2017 but lost in the gold medal game to Ontario's Rachel Homan in an extra end, a team she had beaten twice previously in the tournament. Englot curled a low 70% in the final game en route to the loss. Despite Englot's struggling, the final was believed by many to be the most exciting Scotties final ever with much spectacular play from both teams, including a few spectacular shots from Englot herself amidst the inconsistency.

Englot represented Team Canada at the 2018 Scotties Tournament of Hearts, due to Team Homan winning the 2017 Canadian Olympic Curling Trials. There she missed the playoffs, finishing with a 6-5 record. Following the season, she announced that she was retiring from competitive curling.

Englot came out of retirement for the 2019–20 curling season to skip a young team of Sara England, Shelby Brandt, and Stasia Wisniewski.

== Personal life ==
Englot works as the director of external communications for SaskTel. She has two children. She was formerly married to football player Dave Ridgway.

== Grand Slam record ==
Key
C	Champion
F	Lost in Final
SF	Lost in Semifinal
QF	Lost in Quarterfinals
R16	Lost in the round of 16
Q	Did not advance to playoffs
T2	Played in Tier 2 event
DNP	Did not participate in event
N/A	Not a Grand Slam event that season

Event	2006–07	2007–08	2008–09	2009–10	2010–11	2011–12	2012–13	2013–14	2014–15	2015–16	2016–17	2017–18
Tour Challenge	N/A	N/A	N/A	N/A	N/A	N/A	N/A	N/A	N/A	DNP	F	QF
Masters	N/A	N/A	N/A	N/A	N/A	N/A	DNP	DNP	DNP	DNP	DNP	Q
The National	N/A	N/A	N/A	N/A	N/A	N/A	N/A	N/A	N/A	DNP	DNP	Q
Canadian Open	N/A	N/A	N/A	N/A	N/A	N/A	N/A	N/A	DNP	DNP	Q	F
Players'	DNP	QF	Q	DNP	DNP	DNP	DNP	DNP	DNP	DNP	Q	DNP

=== Former events ===
Event	2006–07	2007–08	2008–09	2009–10	2010–11	2011–12	2012–13	2013–14	2014–15
Wayden Transportation	Q	QF	QF	N/A	N/A	N/A	N/A	N/A	N/A
Autumn Gold	DNP	DNP	Q	Q	Q	DNP	DNP	DNP	DNP
Manitoba Liquor & Lotteries	Q	Q	C	Q	Q	DNP	DNP	Q	N/A
Colonial Square Ladies Classic	N/A	N/A	N/A	N/A	N/A	N/A	Q	Q	Q

== Teams ==
Season	Skip	Third	Second	Lead
2004–05	Michelle Englot	Jolene Campbell	Michelle McIvor	Cindy Simmons
2009–10	Michelle Englot	Deanna Doig	Roberta Materi	Cindy Simmons
2010–11	Michelle Englot	Lana Vey	Roberta Materi	Deanna Doig
2011–12	Michelle Englot	Lana Vey	Roberta Materi	Sarah Slywka
2012–13	Lana Vey (fourth)	Michelle Englot (skip)	Roberta Materi	Sarah Slywka
2013–14	Michelle Englot	Candace Chisholm	Roberta Materi	Kristy Johnson
2014–15	Michelle Englot	Candace Chisholm	Ashley Howard	Kristy Johnson
2015–16	Michelle Englot	Candace Chisholm	Stephanie Schmidt	Brooklyn Lemon
2016–17	Michelle Englot	Kate Cameron	Leslie Wilson-Westcott	Raunora Westcott
2017–18	Michelle Englot	Kate Cameron	Leslie Wilson-Westcott	Raunora Westcott
2019–20	Michelle Englot	Sara England	Shelby Brandt	Stasia Wisniewski
2020–21	Michelle Englot	Sara England	Shelby Brandt	Nicole Bender
2021–22	Michelle Englot	Sara England	Shelby Brandt	Nicole Bender
2022–23	Brooklyn Stevenson	Candace Chisholm	Michelle Englot	Nicole Bender
2023–24	Stephanie Schmidt (Fourth)	Sara England	Ashley Williamson	Michelle Englot (Skip)
2024–25	Stephanie Schmidt (Fourth)	Sara England	Ashley Williamson	Michelle Englot (Skip)
