= 1990 Scott Tournament of Hearts =

Canadian women's curling championship

- Host city: Ottawa, Ontario
- Arena: Ottawa Civic Centre
- Dates: February 24–March 3
- Attendance: 29,042
- Winner: Ontario
- Curling club: Bayview G&CC, Thornhill
- Skip: Alison Goring
- Third: Kristin Turcotte
- Second: Andrea Lawes
- Lead: Cheryl McPherson
- Alternate: Anne Merklinger
- Finalist: Nova Scotia (Heather Rankin)

The 1990 Scott Tournament of Hearts, the Canadian women's national curling championship, was held from February 24 to March 3, 1990, at the Ottawa Civic Centre in Ottawa, Ontario. The total attendance for the week was 29,042.

Team Ontario, who was skipped by Alison Goring won the event on home soil as they beat Nova Scotia in the final 7–5. Ontario advanced to the final after defeating two-time champion Heather Houston and Team Canada 8–3 in the semifinal. This was the third time that Ontario had won the event and the fourth time in the last five years that a rink from Ontario had won. The Goring rink would go onto represent Canada in the 1990 World Women's Curling Championship held in Västerås, Sweden where they lost in the semifinal to eventual champion Norway.

New Brunswick's 11–0 victory over Alberta in Draw 5 was the sixth shutout record in tournament history and the first time ever where there were shutouts recorded in back-to-back tournaments. Canada's 6–4 victory over Quebec was the fourth game in tournament history in which a game went into a second extra end with the others occurring in 1981, 1982 and 1989.

== Teams ==
The teams were listed as follows:

Team Canada	Alberta	British Columbia	Manitoba
Fort William CC, Thunder Bay Skip: Heather Houston; Third: Lorraine Lang; Second: Diane Adams; Lead: Tracy Kennedy; Alternate: Gloria Taylor	Shamrock CC, Edmonton Skip: Deb Shermack; Third: Jackie-Rae Greening; Second: Diane Alexander; Lead: Leanne Usher; Alternate: Diane Bowes	Golden Ears CC, Haney Skip: Kelley Atkins; Third: Donna Maitland; Second: Karen Koyanagi; Lead: Terry Ridley; Alternate: Linda Kirton	Fort Garry CC, Winnipeg Skip: Janet Harvey; Third: Jennifer Ryan; Second: Janine Sigurdson; Lead: Kim Overton; Alternate: Laurie Allen
New Brunswick	Newfoundland	Nova Scotia	Ontario
Thistle St. Andrews CC, Saint John Skip: Heidi Hanlon; Third: Kathy Floyd; Second: Sheri Stewart; Lead: Judy Blanchard; Alternate: Mary Harding	Carol CC, Labrador City Skip: Sue Anne Bartlett; Third: Patricia Dwyer; Second: Debbie Porter; Lead: Wendy Chaulk; Alternate: Marcella Brown	Halifax CC, Halifax Skip: Heather Rankin; Third: Beth Rankin; Second: Judy Power; Lead: Sue Green; Alternate: Mary Mattatall	Bayview G&CC, Thornhill Skip: Alison Goring; Third: Kristin Turcotte; Second: Andrea Lawes; Lead: Cheryl McPherson; Alternate: Anne Merklinger
Prince Edward Island	Quebec	Saskatchewan	Yukon/Northwest Territories
Charlottetown CC, Charlottetown Skip: Kim Dolan; Third: Karen Jones; Second: Shelley Muzika; Lead: Janice MacCallum; Alternate: Cathy Dillon	Glenmore CC, Montreal Skip: Francine Poisson; Third: Katie Brown; Second: Cindy McHugh; Lead: Elena Gabriele (Note: Team Quebec alternate Sally Nelthorpe threw lead stones in Draw 15.); Alternate: Sally Nelthorpe	Tartan CC, Regina Skip: Michelle Schneider; Third: Kathy Fahlman; Second: Joan Stricker; Lead: Lorie Kehler; Alternate: Kenda Richards	Whitehorse CC, Whitehorse Skip: Kathy Chapman (Note: Team Yukon/Northwest Territories alternate Michelle Cowan threw skip stones in Draw 13.); Third: Dawn Moses (Note: For Draws 5-12 (five games), Team Yukon/Northwest Territories second Debbie Stokes threw third stones while third Dawn Moses threw second stones.); Second: Debbie Stokes; Lead: Donna Scott; Alternate: Michelle Cowan

== Map of teams ==
Team Canada Provincial Winners

== Round Robin standings ==
Final Round Robin standings

Key
Teams to Playoffs

Team	Skip	W	L	PF	PA	EW	EL	BE	SE	S%
Nova Scotia	Heather Rankin	9	2	85	49	49	37	3	17	70%
Ontario	Alison Goring	7	4	80	59	53	38	6	20	73%
Canada	Heather Houston	7	4	74	60	50	38	4	20	71%
Alberta	Deb Shermack	6	5	62	72	43	50	5	7	71%
Newfoundland	Sue Anne Bartlett	6	5	67	74	48	50	6	11	62%
Saskatchewan	Michelle Schneider	6	5	69	56	44	43	12	9	70%
New Brunswick	Heidi Hanlon	5	6	74	75	44	45	8	14	63%
Manitoba	Janet Harvey	5	6	67	75	41	57	5	9	66%
British Columbia	Kelley Atkins	5	6	71	64	50	43	2	18	64%
Prince Edward Island	Kim Dolan	4	7	56	56	40	45	12	13	66%
Quebec	Francine Poisson	4	7	53	80	41	48	7	9	64%
Yukon/Northwest Territories	Kathy Chapman	2	9	44	82	36	45	9	5	67%

== Round Robin results ==
All draw times are listed in Eastern Standard Time (UTC-05:00).

=== Draw 1 ===
Saturday, February 24, 2:00 pm

Sheet A	1	2	3	4	5	6	7	8	9	10	Final
Alberta (Shermack)	0	1	0	0	2	1	0	0	0	4	8
Yukon/Northwest Territories (Chapman) 🔨	1	0	0	1	0	0	0	0	1	0	3

Sheet B	1	2	3	4	5	6	7	8	9	10	Final
Prince Edward Island (Dolan) 🔨	1	1	0	4	1	0	2	0	X	X	9
Quebec (Poisson)	0	0	1	0	0	1	0	1	X	X	3

Sheet C	1	2	3	4	5	6	7	8	9	10	Final
New Brunswick (Hanlon) 🔨	1	0	0	1	0	1	0	1	0	X	4
Saskatchewan (Schneider)	0	2	0	0	2	0	2	0	2	X	8

Sheet D	1	2	3	4	5	6	7	8	9	10	Final
Nova Scotia (Rankin) 🔨	0	2	0	1	1	5	2	X	X	X	11
Newfoundland (Bartlett)	1	0	0	0	0	0	0	X	X	X	1

Sheet E	1	2	3	4	5	6	7	8	9	10	Final
Canada (Houston) 🔨	2	0	1	0	1	0	1	0	1	0	6
Manitoba (Harvey)	0	2	0	1	0	1	0	0	0	4	8

=== Draw 2 ===
Saturday, February 24, 7:30 pm

Sheet A	1	2	3	4	5	6	7	8	9	10	Final
Canada (Houston) 🔨	2	0	1	0	1	1	0	1	2	0	8
Newfoundland (Bartlett)	0	3	0	2	0	0	2	0	0	0	7

Sheet B	1	2	3	4	5	6	7	8	9	10	11	Final
Saskatchewan (Schneider) 🔨	0	1	0	0	2	1	0	2	0	2	0	8
Nova Scotia (Rankin)	1	0	3	1	0	0	2	0	1	0	1	9

Sheet C	1	2	3	4	5	6	7	8	9	10	11	Final
Alberta (Shermack) 🔨	0	2	3	0	0	0	2	0	1	0	1	9
Manitoba (Harvey)	1	0	0	2	2	1	0	1	0	1	0	8

Sheet D	1	2	3	4	5	6	7	8	9	10	Final
Yukon/Northwest Territories (Chapman) 🔨	1	0	0	0	0	0	1	0	X	X	2
New Brunswick (Hanlon)	0	0	2	1	5	1	0	2	X	X	11

Sheet E	1	2	3	4	5	6	7	8	9	10	Final
Ontario (Goring) 🔨	2	1	0	0	1	0	2	0	0	X	6
British Columbia (Atkins)	0	0	1	0	0	1	0	0	2	X	4

=== Draw 3 ===
Sunday, February 25, 2:00 pm

Sheet A	1	2	3	4	5	6	7	8	9	10	Final
Quebec (Poisson)	0	2	0	0	1	0	1	0	0	X	4
Nova Scotia (Rankin) 🔨	4	0	1	0	0	1	0	1	2	X	9

Sheet B	1	2	3	4	5	6	7	8	9	10	Final
Ontario (Goring) 🔨	0	2	0	0	3	0	2	0	4	X	11
Alberta (Shermack)	2	0	0	1	0	1	0	2	0	X	6

Sheet C	1	2	3	4	5	6	7	8	9	10	Final
Newfoundland (Bartlett) 🔨	0	1	0	1	1	0	1	0	0	1	5
Prince Edward Island (Dolan)	0	0	1	0	0	1	0	0	1	0	3

Sheet D	1	2	3	4	5	6	7	8	9	10	Final
British Columbia (Atkins) 🔨	1	0	1	0	2	0	0	0	1	1	6
Manitoba (Harvey)	0	1	0	3	0	1	1	1	0	0	7

Sheet E	1	2	3	4	5	6	7	8	9	10	Final
Yukon/Northwest Territories (Chapman) 🔨	0	1	0	1	0	0	2	0	1	X	5
Canada (Houston)	1	0	2	0	1	2	0	3	0	X	9

=== Draw 4 ===
Sunday, February 25, 7:30 pm

Sheet A	1	2	3	4	5	6	7	8	9	10	Final
Manitoba (Harvey) 🔨	0	0	0	0	0	0	2	0	0	X	2
Prince Edward Island (Dolan)	2	0	0	1	1	1	0	2	1	X	8

Sheet B	1	2	3	4	5	6	7	8	9	10	Final
Canada (Houston) 🔨	2	0	3	1	1	0	2	2	X	X	11
New Brunswick (Hanlon)	0	2	0	0	0	2	0	0	X	X	4

Sheet C	1	2	3	4	5	6	7	8	9	10	Final
British Columbia (Atkins) 🔨	1	0	1	1	0	0	2	2	0	X	7
Nova Scotia (Rankin)	0	1	0	0	0	1	0	0	X	X	5

Sheet D	1	2	3	4	5	6	7	8	9	10	Final
Saskatchewan (Schneider) 🔨	0	4	0	1	5	0	X	X	X	X	10
Quebec (Poisson)	1	0	1	0	0	1	X	X	X	X	3

Sheet E	1	2	3	4	5	6	7	8	9	10	Final
Newfoundland (Bartlett) 🔨	3	0	2	0	0	0	0	1	0	X	6
Ontario (Goring)	0	4	0	2	0	1	1	0	2	X	10

=== Draw 5 ===
Monday, February 26, 9:00 am

Sheet C	1	2	3	4	5	6	7	8	9	10	Final
Saskatchewan (Schneider) 🔨	0	0	0	0	1	0	2	0	4	X	7
Yukon/Northwest Territories (Chapman)	0	0	0	0	0	1	0	1	0	X	2

Sheet D	1	2	3	4	5	6	7	8	9	10	Final
New Brunswick (Hanlon) 🔨	1	0	2	1	0	5	2	X	X	X	11
Alberta (Shermack)	0	0	0	0	0	0	0	X	X	X	0

=== Draw 6 ===
Monday, February 26, 2:00 pm

Sheet A	1	2	3	4	5	6	7	8	9	10	Final
New Brunswick (Hanlon) 🔨	0	1	0	0	0	0	1	1	0	0	3
Nova Scotia (Rankin)	0	0	2	0	3	1	0	0	2	0	8

Sheet B	1	2	3	4	5	6	7	8	9	10	Final
Manitoba (Harvey) 🔨	1	0	3	0	0	0	0	1	0	4	9
Ontario (Goring)	0	1	0	1	1	1	2	0	2	0	8

Sheet C	1	2	3	4	5	6	7	8	9	10	Final
Newfoundland (Bartlett) 🔨	2	0	2	0	0	1	0	1	1	0	7
Quebec (Poisson)	0	3	0	2	2	0	2	0	0	0	9

Sheet D	1	2	3	4	5	6	7	8	9	10	Final
Canada (Houston) 🔨	0	1	1	0	2	3	3	X	X	X	10
British Columbia (Atkins)	1	0	0	1	0	0	0	X	X	X	2

Sheet E	1	2	3	4	5	6	7	8	9	10	Final
Prince Edward Island (Dolan)	0	0	1	0	1	1	0	0	1	0	4
Saskatchewan (Schneider) 🔨	0	3	0	3	0	0	1	1	0	0	8

=== Draw 7 ===
Monday, February 26, 7:30 pm

Sheet A	1	2	3	4	5	6	7	8	9	10	Final
Quebec (Poisson) 🔨	0	0	1	1	0	1	0	1	0	1	5
Manitoba (Harvey)	0	1	0	0	1	0	1	0	1	0	4

Sheet B	1	2	3	4	5	6	7	8	9	10	Final
British Columbia (Atkins) 🔨	0	0	1	0	0	1	1	0	2	0	5
Newfoundland (Bartlett)	1	1	0	1	1	0	0	1	0	1	6

Sheet C	1	2	3	4	5	6	7	8	9	10	Final
Ontario (Goring) 🔨	2	1	0	0	2	1	1	0	0	X	7
Canada (Houston)	0	0	1	0	0	0	0	2	1	X	4

Sheet D	1	2	3	4	5	6	7	8	9	10	Final
Alberta (Shermack) 🔨	1	1	0	1	0	2	0	1	0	X	6
Prince Edward Island (Dolan)	0	0	1	0	0	0	1	0	1	X	3

Sheet E	1	2	3	4	5	6	7	8	9	10	Final
Yukon/Northwest Territories (Chapman)	0	2	0	1	0	0	0	X	X	X	3
Nova Scotia (Rankin) 🔨	2	0	1	0	3	2	2	X	X	X	10

=== Draw 8 ===
Tuesday, February 27, 9:00 am

Sheet B	1	2	3	4	5	6	7	8	9	10	Final
Nova Scotia (Rankin) 🔨	2	0	0	4	0	1	3	X	X	X	10
Canada (Houston)	0	2	0	0	2	0	0	X	X	X	4

Sheet C	1	2	3	4	5	6	7	8	9	10	Final
Manitoba (Harvey) 🔨	2	0	1	0	2	0	1	0	0	0	6
Newfoundland (Bartlett)	0	1	0	2	0	1	0	2	1	1	8

=== Draw 9 ===
Tuesday, February 27, 2:00 pm

Sheet A	1	2	3	4	5	6	7	8	9	10	Final
British Columbia (Atkins)	0	0	2	0	0	1	0	1	0	2	6
Saskatchewan (Schneider) 🔨	0	1	0	1	0	0	1	0	1	0	4

Sheet B	1	2	3	4	5	6	7	8	9	10	Final
New Brunswick (Hanlon) 🔨	0	3	1	0	1	1	0	2	2	X	10
Manitoba (Harvey)	1	0	0	2	0	0	3	0	0	X	6

Sheet C	1	2	3	4	5	6	7	8	9	10	Final
Prince Edward Island (Dolan) 🔨	0	0	0	0	1	0	1	0	1	X	3
Nova Scotia (Rankin)	2	0	1	0	0	1	0	1	0	X	5

Sheet D	1	2	3	4	5	6	7	8	9	10	Final
Ontario (Goring) 🔨	3	0	0	0	1	0	0	1	1	0	6
Yukon/Northwest Territories (Chapman)	0	0	1	0	0	0	3	0	0	3	7

Sheet E	1	2	3	4	5	6	7	8	9	10	Final
Alberta (Shermack)	0	0	1	0	0	1	0	0	1	X	3
Quebec (Poisson) 🔨	0	1	0	0	1	0	1	2	0	X	5

=== Draw 10 ===
Tuesday, February 27, 7:30 pm

Sheet A	1	2	3	4	5	6	7	8	9	10	Final
Prince Edward Island (Dolan) 🔨	0	0	0	2	1	0	0	0	1	0	4
Ontario (Goring)	1	1	1	0	0	0	1	1	0	2	7

Sheet B	1	2	3	4	5	6	7	8	9	10	Final
Alberta (Shermack) 🔨	0	2	0	1	0	0	0	2	0	0	5
British Columbia (Atkins)	1	0	1	0	1	1	1	0	1	2	8

Sheet C	1	2	3	4	5	6	7	8	9	10	Final
Quebec (Poisson) 🔨	1	0	2	0	2	0	1	0	0	X	6
Yukon/Northwest Territories (Chapman)	0	2	0	1	0	2	0	0	1	X	5

Sheet D	1	2	3	4	5	6	7	8	9	10	Final
Canada (Houston) 🔨	1	0	0	0	0	2	0	0	0	1	4
Saskatchewan (Schneider)	0	1	0	1	1	0	1	0	1	0	5

Sheet E	1	2	3	4	5	6	7	8	9	10	11	Final
New Brunswick (Hanlon) 🔨	0	1	1	0	2	0	1	0	0	1	0	6
Newfoundland (Bartlett)	0	0	0	2	0	2	0	1	1	0	1	7

=== Draw 11 ===
Wednesday, February 28, 9:00 am

Sheet C	1	2	3	4	5	6	7	8	9	10	11	Final
British Columbia (Atkins)	0	0	0	1	2	1	0	1	0	0	0	5
Prince Edward Island (Dolan) 🔨	0	0	1	0	0	0	2	0	0	2	1	6

Sheet D	1	2	3	4	5	6	7	8	9	10	Final
Quebec (Poisson) 🔨	1	0	2	0	0	1	0	1	1	0	6
Ontario (Goring)	0	3	0	1	1	0	1	0	0	1	7

=== Draw 12 ===
Wednesday, February 28, 2:00 pm

Sheet A	1	2	3	4	5	6	7	8	9	10	Final
Alberta (Shermack) 🔨	0	1	0	2	0	0	2	0	1	0	6
Canada (Houston)	1	0	1	0	2	1	0	1	0	1	7

Sheet B	1	2	3	4	5	6	7	8	9	10	Final
Newfoundland (Bartlett) 🔨	0	1	1	0	2	0	0	0	0	2	6
Yukon/Northwest Territories (Chapman)	1	0	0	1	0	1	1	1	0	0	5

Sheet C	1	2	3	4	5	6	7	8	9	10	Final
Nova Scotia (Rankin) 🔨	2	0	1	0	0	2	0	1	0	0	6
Ontario (Goring)	0	1	0	0	1	0	2	0	1	0	5

Sheet D	1	2	3	4	5	6	7	8	9	10	Final
New Brunswick (Hanlon) 🔨	1	0	2	0	3	0	0	0	0	4	10
British Columbia (Atkins)	0	1	0	3	0	2	1	1	1	0	9

Sheet E	1	2	3	4	5	6	7	8	9	10	Final
Manitoba (Harvey) 🔨	2	0	1	0	1	0	0	2	0	0	6
Saskatchewan (Schneider)	0	0	0	2	0	0	1	0	1	1	5

=== Draw 13 ===
Wednesday, February 28, 7:30 pm

Sheet A	1	2	3	4	5	6	7	8	9	10	Final
Newfoundland (Bartlett) 🔨	2	0	1	0	1	0	2	2	0	X	8
Saskatchewan (Schneider)	0	1	0	1	0	1	0	0	1	X	4

Sheet B	1	2	3	4	5	6	7	8	9	10	Final
Quebec (Poisson) 🔨	1	0	1	1	0	1	0	0	2	X	6
New Brunswick (Hanlon)	0	1	0	0	4	0	3	1	0	X	9

Sheet C	1	2	3	4	5	6	7	8	9	10	Final
Yukon/Northwest Territories (Chapman) 🔨	0	1	0	0	1	0	0	0	1	X	3
Manitoba (Harvey)	0	0	0	2	0	0	3	1	0	X	6

Sheet D	1	2	3	4	5	6	7	8	9	10	Final
Canada (Houston)	0	1	0	1	0	0	1	2	0	X	5
Prince Edward Island (Dolan) 🔨	0	0	0	0	1	1	0	0	0	X	2

Sheet E	1	2	3	4	5	6	7	8	9	10	Final
Alberta (Shermack) 🔨	1	1	0	0	1	0	1	1	0	1	6
Nova Scotia (Rankin)	0	0	2	0	0	1	0	0	2	0	5

=== Draw 14 ===
Thursday, March 1, 2:00 pm

Sheet A	1	2	3	4	5	6	7	8	9	10	Final
British Columbia (Atkins) 🔨	3	0	1	0	1	0	1	0	2	X	8
Yukon/Northwest Territories (Chapman)	0	1	0	1	0	0	0	1	0	X	3

Sheet B	1	2	3	4	5	6	7	8	9	10	11	Final
Ontario (Goring) 🔨	0	0	1	1	0	0	1	0	0	1	0	4
Saskatchewan (Schneider)	1	1	0	0	2	0	0	0	0	0	1	5

Sheet C	1	2	3	4	5	6	7	8	9	10	11	12	Final
Canada (Houston) 🔨	1	0	0	0	0	0	0	1	1	1	0	2	6
Quebec (Poisson)	0	0	1	2	0	0	1	0	0	0	0	0	4

Sheet D	1	2	3	4	5	6	7	8	9	10	11	Final
Newfoundland (Bartlett) 🔨	1	0	1	0	1	0	0	1	0	2	0	6
Alberta (Shermack)	0	1	0	1	0	1	0	0	3	0	1	7

Sheet E	1	2	3	4	5	6	7	8	9	10	Final
Prince Edward Island (Dolan) 🔨	2	0	3	0	1	0	0	3	0	X	9
New Brunswick (Hanlon)	0	0	0	1	0	1	1	0	1	X	4

=== Draw 15 ===
Thursday, March 1, 7:30 pm

Sheet A	1	2	3	4	5	6	7	8	9	10	Final
Ontario (Goring) 🔨	1	1	0	1	0	3	0	1	2	X	9
New Brunswick (Hanlon)	0	0	1	0	1	0	0	0	0	X	2

Sheet B	1	2	3	4	5	6	7	8	9	10	11	Final
Yukon/Northwest Territories (Chapman) 🔨	1	0	0	0	1	2	0	0	0	1	1	6
Prince Edward Island (Dolan)	0	0	0	2	0	0	2	0	1	0	0	5

Sheet C	1	2	3	4	5	6	7	8	9	10	Final
Saskatchewan (Schneider) 🔨	0	1	0	1	0	0	2	0	1	0	5
Alberta (Shermack)	0	0	2	0	0	1	0	1	0	2	6

Sheet D	1	2	3	4	5	6	7	8	9	10	Final
Manitoba (Harvey) 🔨	2	0	2	0	0	0	0	1	0	X	5
Nova Scotia (Rankin)	0	1	0	1	1	1	1	0	2	X	7

Sheet E	1	2	3	4	5	6	7	8	9	10	Final
British Columbia (Atkins) 🔨	0	4	2	2	0	2	1	X	X	X	11
Quebec (Poisson)	1	0	0	0	1	0	0	X	X	X	2

== Playoffs ==
Semifinal			Final
			1	Nova Scotia	5
2	Ontario	8	2	Ontario	7
3	Canada	3

=== Semifinal ===
Friday, March 2, 7:30 pm

Sheet C	1	2	3	4	5	6	7	8	9	10	Final
Ontario (Goring) 🔨	2	1	0	0	2	0	1	2	0	X	8
Canada (Houston)	0	0	1	0	0	1	0	0	1	X	3

Player percentages
Ontario		Canada	
Cheryl McPherson	93%	Tracy Kennedy	93%
Andrea Lawes	74%	Diane Adams	83%
Kristin Turcotte	82%	Lorraine Lang	79%
Alison Goring	85%	Heather Houston	44%
Total	83%	Total	75%

=== Final ===
Saturday, March 3, 2:00 pm

Sheet C	1	2	3	4	5	6	7	8	9	10	Final
Nova Scotia (Rankin) 🔨	1	0	0	0	0	2	0	0	2	0	5
Ontario (Goring)	0	0	0	0	3	0	1	2	0	1	7

Player percentages
Nova Scotia		Ontario	
Sue Green	66%	Cheryl McPherson	65%
Judy Power	86%	Andrea Lawes	65%
Beth Rankin	57%	Kristin Turcotte	69%
Heather Rankin	63%	Alison Goring	61%
Total	68%	Total	68%

== Statistics ==
=== Top 5 player percentages ===
Final Round Robin Percentages

Key
All-Star Team

Leads	%
(Canada) Tracy Kennedy	76
(Saskatchewan) Lorie Kehler	75
(Prince Edward Island) Janice MacCallum	74
(Yukon) Donna Scott	74
(Alberta) Leanne Usher	72
(Ontario) Cheryl McPherson	72

Seconds	%
(Ontario) Andrea Lawes	79
(Saskatchewan) Joan Stricker	69
(Canada) Diane Adams	69
(Alberta) Diane Alexander	68
(Yukon) Debbie Stokes (Note: Stokes' shot percentage includes draws where she threw third stones.)	67
(Nova Scotia) Judy Power	67

Thirds	%
(Alberta) Jackie-Rae Greening	75
(Ontario) Kristin Turcotte	72
(Canada) Lorraine Lang	69
(Manitoba) Jennifer Ryan	68
(Newfoundland and Labrador) Patricia Dwyer	68

Skips	%
(Saskatchewan) Michelle Schneider	71
(Nova Scotia) Heather Rankin	70
(Canada) Heather Houston	70
(Ontario) Alison Goring	69
(Alberta) Deb Shermack	67

== Awards ==
The all-star team and sportsmanship award winners were as follows:

=== All-Star Team ===
Position	Name	Team
Skip	Heather Rankin	Nova Scotia
Third	Jackie-Rae Greening	Alberta
Second	Andrea Lawes	Ontario
Lead	Lorie Kehler	Saskatchewan

=== Lee Tobin Award ===
The Scotties Tournament of Hearts Sportsmanship Award is presented to the curler who best embodies the spirit of curling at the Scotties Tournament of Hearts. The winner was selected in a vote by all players at the tournament.

Prior to 1998, the award was named after a notable individual in the curling community where the tournament was held that year. For this edition, the award was named after Lee Tobin. Tobin, known as "Little Mouse" skipped in four women's national championships for Quebec and won the 1975 Macdonald Lassies championship, which to date is Quebec's only women's championship. Tobin was inducted into the Canadian Curling Hall of Fame in 1979.

Name	Team	Position
Jackie-Rae Greening	Alberta	Third
