= 2002 Ontario Scott Tournament of Hearts =

Canadian women's curling championship

- Host city: Thunder Bay, Ontario
- Arena: Thunder Bay Tournament Centre
- Dates: January 22–26, 2002
- Winner: Team Middaugh
- Curling club: Coldwater & District CC
- Skip: Sherry Middaugh
- Third: Janet Brown
- Second: Andrea Lawes
- Lead: Sheri Cordina
- Alternate: Diane Adams (Note: Adams, from Thunder Bay spared for the team for half a game in Draw 8 when Brown was injured)
- Coach: Pat Reid
- Finalist: Darcie Simpson

The 2002 Ontario Scott Tournament of Hearts, the provincial women's championship of Ontario was held January 22 to 26 at the Thunder Bay Tournament Centre in Thunder Bay. The Sherry Middaugh rink from Coldwater, Ontario won the event. She and her rink of Janet Brown, Andrea Lawes and Sheri Cordina would go on to represent Ontario at the 2002 Scott Tournament of Hearts.

In the final, Middaugh defeated Darcie Simpson and her team of Kellie Andrews, Dawn Askin and Linda Fulton of Ottawa, 6–4. Middaugh took an early lead in the game, stealing a point in the first end when Simpson missed both her shots. Simpson tied the game in the second, but missed a chance for a third point when she missed a tap-up. Middaugh scored a deuce in the fourth to take a 3–1 lead, she drew for a second shot, but almost went through the rings. Simpson tied the game in the fifth after making a hit and roll for two, but could have scored a third point if her shooter stuck around. The teams traded singles in the seventh and eighth ends. Middaugh scored a game-changing two points in the 9th end to take a 6–4 lead, making a delicate tap of one of her rocks in front of the house. She made a difficult takeout in the 10th end to clinch the victory, running Simpson out of rocks. It was the second straight provincial title for Middaugh.

It was the first Ontario Hearts to be played on arena ice, rather than on curling club ice. Almost 10,000 people attended the event, which saw sell-outs for almost every draw.

== Standings ==
Final standings:

Key
Teams to Playoffs
Teams to Tiebreakers

Skip (club)	W	L
Darcie Simpson (Rideau)	8	1
Sherry Middaugh (Coldwater)	6	3
Anne Merklinger (Rideau)	6	3
Tara George (Fort William)	6	3
Karen Bell (Brant)	5	4
Jo-Ann Rizzo (Brant)	5	4
Kirsten Harmark (Bayview)	4	5
Elaine Uhryn (Soo)	2	7
Nancy Wickham (Coniston)	2	7
Jodi Judd (Thunder Bay)	1	8

== Tie breaker ==
- Merlkinger 10, George 4

== Playoffs ==
Semifinal			Final
			1	Darcie Simpson	4
2	Sherry Middaugh	8	2	Sherry Middaugh	6
3	Anne Merklinger	6
