= Tracy Kennedy =

Canadian curler

- Curler

Team
- Curling club: Lakehead Ladies CC, Thunder Bay, ON, Fort William CC, Thunder Bay, ON, Port Arthur CC, Thunder Bay, ON

Curling career
- Member Association: Ontario
- Hearts: 4 (1988, 1989, 1990, 1992)
- World Championship: 2 (1988, 1989)
Medal record
Curling
Representing Canada
World Championships
Gold medal – first place	1989 Milwaukee
Silver medal – second place	1988 Glasgow
Representing Ontario
Scotties Tournament of Hearts
Gold medal – first place	1988 Fredericton
Gold medal – first place	1989 Kelowna
Bronze medal – third place	1990 Ottawa

Tracy Kennedy is a Canadian curler from Thunder Bay, Ontario.

She is a 1989 World women's champion, 1988 World women's silver medallist and a two-time Canadian women's champion (1988, 1989).

In 1994, she was inducted into Canadian Curling Hall of Fame together with all of the Heather Houston 1988 and 1989 team.

== Personal life ==
Kennedy grew up in Thunder Bay, Ontario (Fort William). As of 2014, Kennedy is the general manager of two hotel properties in Thunder Bay. Her father, Darwin Wark represented Northern Ontario at the 1959 Macdonald Brier, while her husband Bruce is a four-time Northern Ontario champion, and winner of the 1982 Air Canada Silver Broom world curling championships.

== Awards ==
- STOH All-Star Team: 1988, 1989.

== Teams and events ==
Season	Skip	Third	Second	Lead	Alternate	Events
1987–88	Heather Houston	Lorraine Lang	Diane Adams	Tracy Kennedy	Gloria Taylor (STOH)	STOH 1988 (gold); WCC 1988 (silver)
1988–89	Heather Houston	Lorraine Lang	Diane Adams	Tracy Kennedy	Gloria Taylor	STOH 1989 (gold); WCC 1989 (gold)
1989–90	Heather Houston	Lorraine Lang	Diane Adams	Tracy Kennedy	Gloria Taylor	STOH 1990 (bronze)
1991–92	Kim Clark	Tracy Kennedy	Patty Wilson	Peggy Barrette	Marlene Inglis	STOH 1992 (8th)
