= 2001 Ontario Scott Tournament of Hearts =

Canadian women's curling championship

- Host city: Kingston, Ontario
- Arena: Cataraqui Golf and Country Club
- Dates: January 23–27, 2001
- Winner: Team Middaugh
- Curling club: Coldwater & District CC
- Skip: Sherry Middaugh
- Third: Janet Brown
- Second: Andrea Lawes
- Lead: Sheri Cordina
- Finalist: Anne Merklinger

The 2001 Ontario Scott Tournament of Hearts, the provincial women's curling championship of Ontario was held January 23 to 27 at the Cataraqui Golf and Country Club in Kingston, Ontario. The Sherry Middaugh rink from Coldwater, Ontario won the event. She and her rink of Janet Brown, Andrea Lawes and Sheri Cordina would go on to represent Ontario at the 2001 Scott Tournament of Hearts.

Middaugh's win earned her a spot at the national championships for the third time. She had previously won the 1996 Saskatchewan championships, and the 1999 Ontario provincials, the latter as a third for Kim Gellard. Entering the 2002 championship, her rink was the top ranked in the country on the women's tour.

In the final, Team Middaugh from Coldwater defeated Team Anne Merklinger (which also consisted of Theresa Breen, Patti McKnight and Audrey Reddick) from Ottawa's Rideau Curling Club, 9–3. Sherry Middaugh curled 100% in the final. Middaugh forced Merklinger to a single in the first end, when Merklinger made a hit against two. In the second end, Merklinger skimmed a guard and jammed her stone on her last, leaving Middaugh first and third shot. Middaugh then made a hit to score three on her last to take a 3–1 lead after two. In the third, Merklinger had a hit against three on her last, but rolled too far in her attempt, giving up a steal of one to go down 4–1. Middaugh did not look back from there, and cemented her victory by scoring another three-ender in the eighth, resulting in Merklinger conceding the game.

The event was intended to be the last to be held on curling club ice, with the plan to play on arena ice in 2002.

== Qualification process ==
Qualification method	Berths	Qualifying team(s)
Southern Ontario	4	Anne Merklinger; Alison Goring; Colleen Madonia; Melanie Palmer
Northern Ontario	2	Nadine Landon; Dawn Schwar
Northwestern Ontario	2	Tara George; Kathie Jackson
West Challenge Round	1	Sherry Middaugh
East Challenge Round	1	Michelle Pellegrin

== Teams ==
The teams were as follows:

Skip	Third	Second	Lead
Tara George	Liz Kingston	Tiffany Stubbings	Kari MacLean
Alison Goring	Kathy Brown	Janet Langevin	Sandy Graham
Kathie Jackson	Kim Beaudry	Kelly Wager	Stacy Beacham
Nadine Landon	Michelle Boland	Nicole Either	Christie Miners
Colleen Madonia	Janet Murphy	Lindsay Donner	Debbie Rauter
Anne Merklinger	Theresa Breen	Patti McKnight	Audrey Reddick
Sherry Middaugh	Janet Brown	Andrea Lawes	Sheri Cordina
Melanie Palmer	Kerry Lackie	Kimberly Veale	Sara Gatchell
Michelle Pellegrin	Heather Moffett	Cheryl Formanski	Marian Arai
Dawn Schwar	Jill Clark	Arryn Bailey	Janice Vettoretti

== Standings ==
Final standings:

Key
Teams to Playoffs
Teams to Tiebreakers

Skip (club)	W	L
Anne Merklinger (Rideau)	7	2
Sherry Middaugh (Coldwater)	6	3
Michelle Pellegrin (Royals)	6	3
Tara George (Fort William)	6	3
Melanie Palmer (Ilderton)	5	4
Alison Goring (Bayview)	4	5
Nadine Landon (Soo)	4	5
Colleen Madonia (North Halton)	3	6
Dawn Schwar (Sudbury)	2	7
Kathie Jackson (Fort Frances)	2	7

== Scores ==
=== January 23 ===
Draw 1

- George 12, Pellegrin 6
- Merklinger 11, Schwar 5
- Madonia 7, Middaugh 5
- Palmer 8, Goring 5
- Landon 8, Jackson 7

Draw 2

- Schwar 10, Jackson 3
- Pellegrin 10, Madonia 7
- George 8, Palmer 0
- Merklinger 9, Landon 3

=== January 24 ===
Draw 3

- Middaugh 7, Merklinger 3
- Landon 9, Palmer 7
- Pellegrin 8, Goring 5
- Jackson 11, Madonia 1
- Schwar 9, George 6

Draw 4

- Pellegrin 8, Palmer 8
- Middaugh 9, Schwar 6
- Merklinger 12, Jackson 3
- George 9, Goring 7
- Madonia 9, Landon 7

=== January 25 ===
Draw 5

- George 8, Madonia 5
- Goring 8, Jackson 5
- Landon 6, Schwar 4
- Merklinger 5, Pellegrin 4
- Palmer 7, Middaugh 6

Draw 6

- Goring 6, Landon 4
- Middaugh 5, George 3
- Palmer 8, Merklinger 6
- Madonia 7, Schwar 2
- Pellegrin 10, Jackson 4

Draw 7

- Palmer 7, Schwar 5
- Pellegrin 6, Landon 4
- Goring 8, Madonia 6
- Middaugh 9, Jackson 2
- Merklinger 9, George 4

=== January 26 ===
Draw 8

- Merklinger 7, Madonia 6
- Jackson 6, Palmer 4
- Middaugh 6, Pellegrin 3
- George 8, Landon 3
- Goring 12, Schwar 5

Draw 9

- Landon 6, Middaugh 3
- Merklinger 10, Goring 4
- George 8, Jackson 5
- Pellegrin 10, Schwar 9
- Palmer 9, Madonia 4

== Tie breaker ==
January 27, 9:30am

Team	1	2	3	4	5	6	7	8	9	10	Final
Michelle Pellegrin	0	4	0	1	0	0	1	0	2	0	8
Tara George	2	0	2	0	1	0	0	1	0	0	6

== Playoffs ==
Semifinal			Final
			1	Anne Merklinger	3
2	Sherry Middaugh	7	2	Sherry Middaugh	9
3	Michelle Pellegrin	3

=== Semifinal ===
Team	1	2	3	4	5	6	7	8	9	10	Final
Sherry Middaugh	2	0	0	0	2	0	0	0	3	X	7
Michelle Pellegrin	0	1	0	0	0	1	0	1	0	X	3

=== Final ===
January 27, 7:30pm

Team	1	2	3	4	5	6	7	8	9	10	Final
Sherry Middaugh	0	3	1	0	0	2	0	3	X	X	9
Anne Merklinger 🔨	1	0	0	1	0	0	1	0	X	X	3
