= 1989 Scott Tournament of Hearts =

Canadian women's curling championship

- Host city: Kelowna, British Columbia
- Arena: Kelowna Memorial Arena
- Dates: February 25–March 4
- Attendance: 19,436
- Winner: Canada
- Curling club: Lakehead Ladies CC, Thunder Bay
- Skip: Heather Houston
- Third: Lorraine Lang
- Second: Diane Adams
- Lead: Tracy Kennedy
- Alternate: Gloria Taylor
- Finalist: Manitoba (Chris More)

The 1989 Scott Tournament of Hearts, the Canadian women's national curling championship, was held from February 25 to March 4, 1989 at the Kelowna Memorial Arena in Kelowna, British Columbia. The total attendance for the week was 19,436.

The defending champions, Team Canada, who was skipped by Heather Houston repeated as champions as they defeated Manitoba in the final 11–5. This was the first time since the introduction of Team Canada in 1986 that they had won the event and the first time since 1973 that a team has successfully defended their title.

Houston's rink would again go onto represent Canada at the 1989 World Women's Curling Championship in Milwaukee, Wisconsin, USA where they won the gold medal over Norway after finishing runner-up the year before.

There were a few notable feats and records that were set in this tournament.

- Alberta's 15–6 victory over Newfoundland in Draw 2 set a Hearts era (since 1982) record for the highest score by a team in one game. This has since been matched three different times.
- Manitoba's 8–0 victory over Alberta in Draw 12 was the fifth time in tournament history that a shutout was recorded.
- In British Columbia's 9–3 win over Newfoundland in Draw 15, BC's third Georgina Hawkes recorded the first perfect game in the women's national championship history since statistics were recorded in 1982.
- The semifinal between Canada and Saskatchewan was the third game ever in tournament history and the only playoff game to date to go into a second extra end.

== Teams ==
The teams were listed as follows:

Team Canada	Alberta	British Columbia	Manitoba
Lakehead Ladies CC, Thunder Bay Skip: Heather Houston; Third: Lorraine Lang; Second: Diane Adams; Lead: Tracy Kennedy; Alternate: Gloria Taylor	Shamrock CC, Edmonton Skip: Deb Shermack; Third: Penny Ryan; Second: Diane Alexander; Lead: Twyla Pruden; Alternate: Sandra Ripple	Victoria CC, Victoria Skip: Julie Sutton (Note: After Draw 11, Team British Columbia skip Julie Sutton threw second stones, third Pat Sanders threw fourth stones, and second Georgina Hawkes threw third stones.); Third: Pat Sanders; Second: Georgina Hawkes; Lead: Melissa Soligo (Note: Team British Columbia alternate Diane Nelson threw lead stones in the last end of Draw 7 and the last five ends of Draw 12.); Alternate: Diane Nelson	Fort Rouge CC, Winnipeg Skip: Chris More; Third: Karen Purdy; Second: Lori Zeller; Lead: Kristen Kuruluk; Alternate: Laurie Allen
New Brunswick	Newfoundland	Nova Scotia	Ontario
Thistle St. Andrew's CC, Saint John Skip: Heidi Hanlon; Third: Kathy Floyd; Second: Sheri Smith; Lead: Judy Blanchard; Alternate: Mary Harding	St. John's CC, St. John's Skip: Laura Phillips; Third: Diane Ryan; Second: Sandra Sparrow; Lead: Karen Thomas; Alternate: Michele Renouf	Halifax CC, Halifax Skip: Colleen Jones; Third: Mary Mattatall; Second: Monica Moriarty; Lead: Kelly Anderson; Alternate: Kim Ackles	Humber Highlands CC, Etobicoke Skip: Jill Greenwood; Third: Yvonne Smith; Second: Carol Davis; Lead: Fran Gareau; Alternate: Chris Hushagen
Prince Edward Island	Quebec	Saskatchewan	Northwest Territories/Yukon
Charlottetown CC, Charlottetown Skip: Kathie Gallant; Third: Susan McInnis; Second: Kathy O'Rourke; Lead: Bea Graham-MacDonald; Alternate: Joan Butcher	Buckingham CC, Buckingham Skip: Agnes Charette; Third: Guylaine Deschatelets; Second: France Charette; Lead: Helene Chicoine; Alternate: Josee L'Ecuyer	Tartan CC, Regina Skip: Michelle Schneider; Third: Joan Stricker; Second: Lorie Kehler; Lead: Leanne Eberle; Alternate: Kenda Richards	Hay River CC, Hay River Skip: Shirley King; Third: Colleen Rudd; Second: Linda Carter; Lead: Donna Hunt; Alternate: Susan Taylor

== Round Robin standings ==
Final Round Robin standings

Key
Teams to Playoffs
Teams to Tiebreakers

Team	Skip	W	L	PF	PA	EW	EL	BE	SE	S%
Manitoba	Chris More	8	3	89	62	55	40	2	20	75%
Saskatchewan	Michelle Schneider	7	4	74	63	47	47	5	13	73%
Canada	Heather Houston	7	4	76	66	49	47	5	11	77%
Nova Scotia	Colleen Jones	7	4	75	56	44	40	8	12	74%
New Brunswick	Heidi Hanlon	7	4	82	64	51	40	3	17	74%
British Columbia	Julie Sutton	7	4	75	55	43	45	6	9	77%
Quebec	Agnes Charette	6	5	69	59	47	45	3	14	71%
Alberta	Deb Shermack	6	5	69	69	41	43	8	15	75%
Prince Edward Island	Kathie Gallant	4	7	74	74	48	50	3	15	71%
Ontario	Jill Greenwood	4	7	49	85	36	48	8	10	67%
Northwest Territories/Yukon	Shirley King	2	9	47	90	37	45	5	12	61%
Newfoundland	Laura Phillips	1	10	61	97	42	50	2	15	66%

== Round Robin results ==
All draw times are listed in Pacific Standard Time (UTC-08:00).

=== Draw 1 ===
Saturday, February 25, 12:00 pm

Sheet A	1	2	3	4	5	6	7	8	9	10	Final
Alberta (Shermack) 🔨	0	1	0	2	0	0	0	0	0	0	3
Quebec (Charette)	0	0	2	0	1	0	1	0	0	2	6

Sheet B	1	2	3	4	5	6	7	8	9	10	Final
Canada (Houston) 🔨	1	0	0	1	0	0	1	0	0	X	3
Nova Scotia (Jones)	0	1	0	0	2	1	0	1	2	X	7

Sheet C	1	2	3	4	5	6	7	8	9	10	Final
Newfoundland (Phillips) 🔨	1	1	1	0	0	0	0	0	X	X	3
Saskatchewan (Schneider)	0	0	0	4	1	1	2	1	X	X	9

Sheet D	1	2	3	4	5	6	7	8	9	10	Final
Northwest Territories/Yukon (King) 🔨	1	0	2	0	0	0	0	X	X	X	3
Manitoba (More)	0	4	0	1	1	1	4	X	X	X	11

Sheet E	1	2	3	4	5	6	7	8	9	10	Final
Ontario (Greenwood) 🔨	0	0	0	0	1	0	3	0	X	X	4
New Brunswick (Hanlon)	0	1	1	3	0	2	0	2	X	X	9

=== Draw 2 ===
Saturday, February 25, 6:00 pm

Sheet A	1	2	3	4	5	6	7	8	9	10	11	Final
Ontario (Greenwood) 🔨	0	0	1	1	1	0	1	0	2	0	1	7
Manitoba (More)	0	1	0	0	0	2	0	1	0	2	0	6

Sheet B	1	2	3	4	5	6	7	8	9	10	Final
Saskatchewan (Schneider) 🔨	1	2	3	3	0	1	X	X	X	X	10
Northwest Territories/Yukon (King)	0	0	0	0	1	0	X	X	X	X	1

Sheet C	1	2	3	4	5	6	7	8	9	10	Final
Quebec (Charette) 🔨	2	0	2	0	1	0	0	0	1	0	6
New Brunswick (Hanlon)	0	1	0	2	0	1	2	1	0	1	8

Sheet D	1	2	3	4	5	6	7	8	9	10	Final
Alberta (Shermack) 🔨	0	2	0	3	0	3	3	0	4	X	15
Newfoundland (Phillips)	2	0	1	0	2	0	0	1	0	X	6

Sheet E	1	2	3	4	5	6	7	8	9	10	Final
British Columbia (Sutton) 🔨	2	0	2	0	0	2	0	0	1	X	7
Prince Edward Island (Gallant)	0	1	0	1	0	0	1	1	0	X	4

=== Draw 3 ===
Sunday, February 26, 12:00 pm

Sheet A	1	2	3	4	5	6	7	8	9	10	Final
Northwest Territories/Yukon (King) 🔨	0	0	1	0	1	0	0	X	X	X	2
Nova Scotia (Jones)	2	0	0	4	0	3	2	X	X	X	11

Sheet B	1	2	3	4	5	6	7	8	9	10	Final
British Columbia (Sutton) 🔨	2	0	3	0	1	1	0	2	X	X	9
Quebec (Charette)	0	1	0	1	0	0	1	0	X	X	3

Sheet C	1	2	3	4	5	6	7	8	9	10	Final
Canada (Houston)	0	4	0	0	1	1	0	2	2	X	10
Manitoba (More) 🔨	2	0	0	2	0	0	3	0	0	X	7

Sheet D	1	2	3	4	5	6	7	8	9	10	Final
Prince Edward Island (Gallant) 🔨	0	0	1	0	0	1	0	0	1	X	3
New Brunswick (Hanlon)	1	0	0	0	2	0	1	1	0	X	5

Sheet E	1	2	3	4	5	6	7	8	9	10	11	Final
Alberta (Shermack) 🔨	1	0	0	0	1	2	0	0	0	2	0	6
Ontario (Greenwood)	0	2	2	1	0	0	0	0	1	0	2	8

=== Draw 4 ===
Sunday, February 26, 6:00 pm

Sheet A	1	2	3	4	5	6	7	8	9	10	Final
New Brunswick (Hanlon) 🔨	1	0	2	0	1	0	1	2	0	1	8
Canada (Houston)	0	2	0	3	0	2	0	0	2	0	9

Sheet B	1	2	3	4	5	6	7	8	9	10	Final
Ontario (Greenwood) 🔨	0	1	0	0	0	0	0	X	X	X	1
Newfoundland (Phillips)	0	0	2	2	1	2	3	X	X	X	10

Sheet C	1	2	3	4	5	6	7	8	9	10	Final
Prince Edward Island (Gallant) 🔨	2	0	1	0	1	0	0	4	0	0	8
Northwest Territories/Yukon (King)	0	2	0	0	0	1	2	0	1	1	7

Sheet D	1	2	3	4	5	6	7	8	9	10	Final
Saskatchewan (Schneider) 🔨	1	0	0	0	2	0	1	0	0	1	5
Nova Scotia (Jones)	0	1	1	0	0	1	0	1	0	0	4

Sheet E	1	2	3	4	5	6	7	8	9	10	Final
Manitoba (More) 🔨	1	0	1	0	1	0	1	0	1	X	5
British Columbia (Sutton)	0	1	0	2	0	3	0	1	0	X	7

=== Draw 5 ===
Monday, February 27, 8:00 am

Sheet C	1	2	3	4	5	6	7	8	9	10	Final
Saskatchewan (Schneider) 🔨	0	0	2	0	2	3	0	0	0	0	7
Alberta (Shermack)	1	1	0	2	0	0	1	0	1	0	6

Sheet D	1	2	3	4	5	6	7	8	9	10	Final
Newfoundland (Phillips) 🔨	0	0	0	0	1	0	1	1	0	X	3
Quebec (Charette)	1	2	1	2	0	1	0	0	2	X	9

=== Draw 6 ===
Monday, February 27, 12:00 pm

Sheet A	1	2	3	4	5	6	7	8	9	10	Final
Northwest Territories/Yukon (King)	0	0	1	2	2	1	0	1	0	X	7
Newfoundland (Phillips) 🔨	3	1	0	0	0	0	1	0	1	X	6

Sheet B	1	2	3	4	5	6	7	8	9	10	Final
New Brunswick (Hanlon) 🔨	1	0	1	0	2	0	0	1	0	1	6
British Columbia (Sutton)	0	0	0	2	0	1	1	0	1	0	5

Sheet C	1	2	3	4	5	6	7	8	9	10	Final
Manitoba (More) 🔨	1	0	0	1	1	2	0	2	0	X	7
Nova Scotia (Jones)	0	0	1	0	0	0	1	0	1	X	3

Sheet D	1	2	3	4	5	6	7	8	9	10	Final
Ontario (Greenwood) 🔨	0	0	1	1	0	1	0	X	X	X	3
Prince Edward Island (Gallant)	2	4	0	0	1	0	6	X	X	X	13

Sheet E	1	2	3	4	5	6	7	8	9	10	Final
Canada (Houston)	0	2	0	1	0	1	0	1	1	X	6
Saskatchewan (Schneider) 🔨	2	0	2	0	2	0	2	0	0	X	8

=== Draw 7 ===
Monday, February 27, 6:00 pm

Sheet A	1	2	3	4	5	6	7	8	9	10	Final
Nova Scotia (Jones) 🔨	1	0	0	0	1	0	0	0	1	X	3
New Brunswick (Hanlon)	0	0	2	2	0	1	1	1	0	X	7

Sheet B	1	2	3	4	5	6	7	8	9	10	Final
Manitoba (More)	0	2	0	0	2	2	1	1	0	X	8
Prince Edward Island (Gallant) 🔨	2	0	1	1	0	0	0	0	1	X	5

Sheet C	1	2	3	4	5	6	7	8	9	10	Final
British Columbia (Sutton) 🔨	4	1	0	1	5	0	X	X	X	X	11
Ontario (Greenwood)	0	0	1	0	0	1	X	X	X	X	2

Sheet D	1	2	3	4	5	6	7	8	9	10	Final
Quebec (Charette) 🔨	1	0	0	3	0	0	1	0	0	X	5
Canada (Houston)	0	1	1	0	1	0	0	0	1	X	4

Sheet E	1	2	3	4	5	6	7	8	9	10	Final
Northwest Territories/Yukon (King) 🔨	1	0	0	1	1	2	0	0	0	0	5
Alberta (Shermack)	0	2	2	0	0	0	0	1	0	1	6

=== Draw 8 ===
Tuesday, February 28, 8:00 am

Sheet B	1	2	3	4	5	6	7	8	9	10	Final
Northwest Territories/Yukon (King) 🔨	1	0	0	1	0	1	1	1	1	X	6
Ontario (Greenwood)	0	1	0	0	1	0	0	0	0	X	2

Sheet C	1	2	3	4	5	6	7	8	9	10	Final
New Brunswick (Hanlon) 🔨	0	0	2	0	3	0	1	0	2	0	8
Manitoba (More)	0	2	0	2	0	1	0	3	0	1	9

=== Draw 9 ===
Tuesday, February 28, 12:00 pm

Sheet A	1	2	3	4	5	6	7	8	9	10	Final
Prince Edward Island (Gallant)	0	3	0	1	0	1	0	1	0	0	6
Saskatchewan (Schneider) 🔨	2	0	1	0	1	0	1	0	3	1	9

Sheet B	1	2	3	4	5	6	7	8	9	10	11	Final
New Brunswick (Hanlon)	1	0	2	1	0	1	0	0	0	0	3	8
Newfoundland (Phillips) 🔨	0	1	0	0	2	0	0	0	1	1	0	5

Sheet C	1	2	3	4	5	6	7	8	9	10	Final
Canada (Houston) 🔨	3	0	0	1	0	1	0	3	0	0	8
Northwest Territories/Yukon (King)	0	1	1	0	1	0	1	0	2	0	6

Sheet D	1	2	3	4	5	6	7	8	9	10	Final
British Columbia (Sutton) 🔨	0	0	2	0	0	4	0	0	0	0	6
Alberta (Shermack)	1	1	0	1	2	0	1	0	0	1	7

Sheet E	1	2	3	4	5	6	7	8	9	10	Final
Nova Scotia (Jones) 🔨	0	1	0	2	0	0	0	2	0	1	6
Quebec (Charette)	1	0	1	0	0	1	0	0	1	0	4

=== Draw 10 ===
Tuesday, February 28, 6:00 pm

Sheet A	1	2	3	4	5	6	7	8	9	10	Final
Canada (Houston) 🔨	0	0	0	1	0	0	2	1	0	2	6
British Columbia (Sutton)	1	1	1	0	0	1	0	0	1	0	5

Sheet B	1	2	3	4	5	6	7	8	9	10	11	Final
Quebec (Charette) 🔨	0	0	1	1	0	1	0	0	3	0	1	7
Prince Edward Island (Gallant)	1	1	0	0	1	0	1	1	0	1	0	6

Sheet C	1	2	3	4	5	6	7	8	9	10	Final
Alberta (Shermack)	0	0	0	0	0	1	1	0	X	X	2
Nova Scotia (Jones) 🔨	0	0	1	2	3	0	0	2	X	X	8

Sheet D	1	2	3	4	5	6	7	8	9	10	Final
Ontario (Greenwood) 🔨	0	5	1	0	0	1	1	0	1	X	9
Saskatchewan (Schneider)	1	0	0	1	0	0	0	1	0	X	3

Sheet E	1	2	3	4	5	6	7	8	9	10	Final
Newfoundland (Phillips) 🔨	0	1	0	0	2	0	2	0	0	X	5
Manitoba (More)	2	0	2	3	0	1	0	1	2	X	11

=== Draw 11 ===
Wednesday, March 1, 8:00 am

Sheet C	1	2	3	4	5	6	7	8	9	10	11	Final
Canada (Houston) 🔨	1	0	2	1	0	0	0	1	0	1	1	7
Prince Edward Island (Gallant)	0	1	0	0	2	1	1	0	1	0	0	6

Sheet D	1	2	3	4	5	6	7	8	9	10	Final
British Columbia (Sutton)	0	1	0	0	1	0	0	0	X	X	2
Nova Scotia (Jones) 🔨	1	0	3	1	0	3	0	1	X	X	9

=== Draw 12 ===
Wednesday, March 1, 12:00 pm

Sheet A	1	2	3	4	5	6	7	8	9	10	Final
Ontario (Greenwood)	1	2	0	0	1	0	0	0	0	1	5
Quebec (Charette) 🔨	0	0	1	1	0	1	0	1	0	0	4

Sheet B	1	2	3	4	5	6	7	8	9	10	Final
Manitoba (More) 🔨	0	3	1	2	1	1	X	X	X	X	8
Alberta (Shermack)	0	0	0	0	0	0	X	X	X	X	0

Sheet C	1	2	3	4	5	6	7	8	9	10	Final
Northwest Territories/Yukon (King) 🔨	1	0	0	0	2	0	0	1	0	X	4
British Columbia (Sutton)	0	2	1	1	0	1	0	0	1	X	6

Sheet D	1	2	3	4	5	6	7	8	9	10	Final
Newfoundland (Phillips) 🔨	0	0	1	0	1	1	0	3	1	0	7
Prince Edward Island (Gallant)	1	1	0	2	0	0	2	0	0	3	9

Sheet E	1	2	3	4	5	6	7	8	9	10	Final
New Brunswick (Hanlon) 🔨	2	1	0	1	0	0	1	0	0	X	5
Saskatchewan (Schneider)	0	0	2	0	0	1	0	2	2	X	7

=== Draw 13 ===
Wednesday, March 1, 6:00 pm

Sheet A	1	2	3	4	5	6	7	8	9	10	Final
Manitoba (More) 🔨	1	1	0	1	0	0	1	0	2	1	7
Saskatchewan (Schneider)	0	0	1	0	1	2	0	2	0	0	6

Sheet B	1	2	3	4	5	6	7	8	9	10	11	Final
Nova Scotia (Jones) 🔨	1	0	2	0	3	0	0	0	3	0	3	12
Newfoundland (Phillips)	0	2	0	2	0	1	0	2	0	2	0	9

Sheet C	1	2	3	4	5	6	7	8	9	10	Final
Alberta (Shermack) 🔨	0	0	0	2	0	1	0	4	1	X	8
New Brunswick (Hanlon)	0	0	1	0	2	0	2	0	0	X	5

Sheet D	1	2	3	4	5	6	7	8	9	10	Final
Canada (Houston) 🔨	2	1	0	2	0	1	0	4	X	X	10
Ontario (Greenwood)	0	0	1	0	1	0	1	0	X	X	3

Sheet E	1	2	3	4	5	6	7	8	9	10	Final
Quebec (Charette) 🔨	0	2	0	3	3	1	X	X	X	X	9
Northwest Territories/Yukon (King)	0	0	1	0	0	0	X	X	X	X	1

=== Draw 14 ===
Thursday, March 2, 12:00 pm

Sheet A	1	2	3	4	5	6	7	8	9	10	Final
Prince Edward Island (Gallant) 🔨	0	1	0	1	1	0	0	1	0	X	4
Alberta (Shermack)	0	0	3	0	0	3	1	0	2	X	9

Sheet B	1	2	3	4	5	6	7	8	9	10	Final
British Columbia (Sutton) 🔨	0	2	0	3	0	1	0	1	0	1	8
Saskatchewan (Schneider)	1	0	1	0	1	0	1	0	2	0	6

Sheet C	1	2	3	4	5	6	7	8	9	10	Final
Ontario (Greenwood) 🔨	2	0	0	2	1	0	0	0	0	0	5
Nova Scotia (Jones)	0	0	2	0	0	0	0	2	2	1	7

Sheet D	1	2	3	4	5	6	7	8	9	10	11	Final
Quebec (Charette)	0	1	0	1	0	2	0	0	3	1	0	8
Manitoba (More) 🔨	2	0	1	0	2	0	2	1	0	0	2	10

Sheet E	1	2	3	4	5	6	7	8	9	10	Final
Canada (Houston) 🔨	0	0	2	0	2	0	0	1	2	X	7
Newfoundland (Phillips)	1	0	0	1	0	2	0	0	0	X	4

=== Draw 15 ===
Thursday, March 2, 6:00 pm

Sheet A	1	2	3	4	5	6	7	8	9	10	Final
British Columbia (Sutton) 🔨	0	4	0	2	0	3	X	X	X	X	9
Newfoundland (Phillips)	1	0	1	0	1	0	X	X	X	X	3

Sheet B	1	2	3	4	5	6	7	8	9	10	11	Final
Alberta (Shermack) 🔨	1	0	0	0	2	0	0	1	0	2	1	7
Canada (Houston)	0	2	1	1	0	1	0	0	1	0	0	6

Sheet C	1	2	3	4	5	6	7	8	9	10	Final
Saskatchewan (Schneider) 🔨	1	0	1	0	1	0	1	0	0	X	4
Quebec (Charette)	0	1	0	1	0	1	0	3	2	X	8

Sheet D	1	2	3	4	5	6	7	8	9	10	Final
New Brunswick (Hanlon) 🔨	2	0	4	2	0	0	5	X	X	X	13
Northwest Territories/Yukon (King)	0	1	0	0	3	1	0	X	X	X	5

Sheet E	1	2	3	4	5	6	7	8	9	10	Final
Prince Edward Island (Gallant) 🔨	2	0	0	0	3	2	1	0	2	X	10
Nova Scotia (Jones)	0	1	0	1	0	0	0	3	0	X	5

== Tiebreakers ==
		To Semifinal
		Saskatchewan	5
New Brunswick	2	British Columbia	3
British Columbia	9
		Canada	8
		Nova Scotia	6

=== Round 1 ===
Friday, March 3, 8:00 am

Sheet B	1	2	3	4	5	6	7	8	9	10	Final
New Brunswick (Hanlon) 🔨	0	1	0	0	0	1	X	X	X	X	2
British Columbia (Sutton)	0	0	2	4	3	0	X	X	X	X	9

Player percentages
New Brunswick		British Columbia	
Judy Blanchard	50%	Melissa Soligo	89%
Sheri Smith	73%	Julie Sutton	83%
Kathy Floyd	42%	Gerogina Hawkes	88%
Heidi Hanlon	43%	Pat Sanders	79%
Total	52%	Total	85%

=== Round 2 ===
Friday, March 3, 12:00 pm

Sheet B	1	2	3	4	5	6	7	8	9	10	Final
Canada (Houston) 🔨	1	0	1	0	0	2	2	0	1	1	8
Nova Scotia (Jones)	0	3	0	2	0	0	0	1	0	0	6

Player percentages
Canada		Nova Scotia	
Tracy Kennedy	79%	Kelly Anderson	64%
Diane Adams	74%	Monica Moriarty	73%
Lorraine Lang	79%	Mary Mattatall	73%
Heather Houston	59%	Colleen Jones	70%
Total	73%	Total	70%

Sheet D	1	2	3	4	5	6	7	8	9	10	Final
British Columbia (Sutton) 🔨	1	0	0	0	1	1	0	0	0	X	3
Saskatchewan (Schneider)	0	1	0	1	0	0	1	0	2	X	5

Player percentages
British Columbia		Saskatchewan	
Melissa Soligo	86%	Leanne Eberle	78%
Julie Sutton	90%	Lorie Kehler	61%
Gerogina Hawkes	63%	Joan Stricker	71%
Pat Sanders	65%	Michelle Schneider	80%
Total	76%	Total	72%

== Playoffs ==
Semifinal			Final
			1	Manitoba	5
2	Saskatchewan	6	2	Canada	11
3	Canada	8

=== Semifinal ===
Friday, March 3, 6:00 pm

Sheet C	1	2	3	4	5	6	7	8	9	10	11	12	Final
Saskatchewan (Schneider)	0	2	0	0	0	1	0	0	2	1	0	0	6
Canada (Houston) 🔨	1	0	2	1	0	0	2	0	0	0	0	2	8

Player percentages
Canada		Saskatchewan	
Tracy Kennedy	79%	Leanne Eberle	92%
Diane Adams	76%	Lorie Kehler	81%
Lorraine Lang	84%	Joan Stricker	82%
Heather Houston	75%	Michelle Schneider	80%
Total	79%	Total	84%

=== Final ===
Saturday, March 4, 11:15 am

Sheet C	1	2	3	4	5	6	7	8	9	10	Final
Canada (Houston)	1	1	1	0	1	3	0	4	0	X	11
Manitoba (More) 🔨	0	0	0	1	0	0	3	0	1	X	5

Player percentages
Canada		Manitoba	
Tracy Kennedy	88%	Kristen Kuruluk	92%
Diane Adams	97%	Lori Zeller	74%
Lorraine Lang	79%	Karen Purdy	81%
Heather Houston	94%	Chris More	57%
Total	90%	Total	76%

== Statistics ==
=== Top 5 player percentages ===
Final Round Robin Percentages

Key
All-Star Team

Leads	%
(British Columbia) Melissa Soligo	80
(Canada) Tracy Kennedy	80
(Alberta) Twyla Pruden	78
(Nova Scotia) Kelly Anderson	77
(Saskatchewan) Leanne Eberle	76

Seconds	%
(Canada) Diane Adams	79
(Alberta) Diane Alexander	77
(British Columbia) Georgina Hawkes (Note: Shot percentages include the final three draws where Team British Columbia changed their lineup with Sutton throwing second stones, Hawkes throwing third stones, and Sanders throwing fourth stones.)	77
(Manitoba) Lori Zeller	75
(Prince Edward Island) Kathy O'Rourke	75

Thirds	%
(Manitoba) Karen Purdy	80
(Canada) Lorraine Lang	77
(British Columbia) Pat Sanders	76
(Alberta) Penny Ryan	75
(Nova Scotia) Mary Mattatall	73

Skips	%
(New Brunswick) Heidi Hanlon	76
(British Columbia) Julie Sutton	76
(Manitoba) Chris More	74
(Canada) Heather Houston	74
(Nova Scotia) Colleen Jones	74

=== Perfect games ===
Player	Team	Position	Shots	Opponent
Georgina Hawkes	British Columbia	Third	12	Newfoundland

== Awards ==
The all-star team and sportsmanship award winners were as follows:

=== All-Star Team ===
Position	Name	Team
Skip	Chris More	Manitoba
Third	Karen Purdy	Manitoba
Second	Diane Alexander	Alberta
Lead	Tracy Kennedy (2)	Canada

=== Sylvia Fedoruk Award ===
The Scotties Tournament of Hearts Sportsmanship Award is presented to the curler who best embodies the spirit of curling at the Scotties Tournament of Hearts. The winner was selected in a vote by all players at the tournament.

Prior to 1998, the award was named after a notable individual in the curling community where the tournament was held that year. For this edition, the award was named after Sylvia Fedoruk, a Canadian Curling Hall of Fame inductee who played third for the Joyce McKee rink that won the inaugural women's championship in 1961 and was president of the Canadian Ladies Curling Association from 1971–72.

Name	Team	Position
Heidi Hanlon	New Brunswick	Skip
