= 1989 World Women's Curling Championship =

- Host city: Milwaukee, Wisconsin
- Arena: Milwaukee Auditorium
- Dates: April 3–9, 1989
- Winner: Canada
- Curling club: Lakehead Ladies CC, Thunder Bay, Ontario
- Skip: Heather Houston
- Third: Lorraine Lang
- Second: Diane Adams
- Lead: Tracy Kennedy
- Alternate: Gloria Taylor
- Finalist: Norway (Trine Trulsen)

The 1989 World Women's Curling Championship was held at the Milwaukee Auditorium in Milwaukee, Wisconsin from April 3–9, 1989.

After having lost the 1988 World final, the Heather Houston team, representing Canada, defeated Norway in the final to claim Canada's sixth women's world championship gold medal.

== Teams ==
Canada	Denmark	Finland	France
Lakehead Ladies CC, Thunder Bay, Ontario Skip: Heather Houston; Third: Lorraine Lang; Second: Diane Adams; Lead: Tracy Kennedy; Alternate: Gloria Taylor	Gentofte CC, Copenhagen Skip: Marianne Qvist; Third: Lene Bidstrup; Second: Astrid Birnbaum; Lead: Lilian Frøhling	Hyvinkää CC, Hyvinkää Skip: Jaana Jokela; Third: Nina Ahvenainen; Second: Terhi Aro; Lead: Tiina Majuri	Megève CC, Megève Fourth: Agnes Mercier; Third: Catherine Lefebvre; Skip: Annick Mercier; Lead: Andrée Dupont-Roc
Germany	Norway	Scotland	Sweden
SC Riessersee, Garmisch-Partenkirchen Skip: Andrea Schöpp; Third: Monika Wagner; Second: Barbara Haller; Lead: Christina Haller	Snarøen CC, Oslo Skip: Trine Trulsen; Third: Dordi Nordby; Second: Hanne Pettersen; Lead: Mette Halvorsen	East Kilbride & Haremyres CC, East Kilbride Skip: Christine Allison; Third: Margaret Scott; Second: Kimmie Brown; Lead: Carol Dawson	Härnösands CK, Härnösands Skip: Anette Norberg; Third: Anna Rindeskog; Second: Sofie Marmont; Lead: Louise Marmont
Switzerland	United States		
Bern Egghölzi Damen CC, Bern Skip: Cristina Lestander; Third: Barbara Meier; Second: Ingrid Thulin; Lead: Katrin Peterhans	Rolla CC, Rolla, North Dakota Skip: Jan Lagasse; Third: Janie Kakela; Second: Colleen Bertsch; Lead: Eileen Mickelson		

== Round robin standings ==
Key
Teams to playoffs
Teams to tiebreaker

Country	Skip	W	L
Norway	Trine Trulsen	8	1
Canada	Heather Houston	7	2
Germany	Andrea Schöpp	5	4
Switzerland	Cristina Lestander	5	4
Sweden	Anette Norberg	5	4
France	Annick Mercier	5	4
Scotland	Christine Allison	4	5
Denmark	Marianne Qvist	4	5
United States	Jan Lagasse	2	7
Finland	Jaana Jokela	0	8

== Round robin results ==
=== Draw 1 ===
Sheet A	Final
Denmark (Qvist)	6
France (Mercier)	7

Sheet B	Final
Scotland (Allison)	8
Norway (Trulsen)	6

Sheet C	Final
Canada (Houston)	10
Germany (Schöpp)	8

Sheet D	Final
United States (Lagasse)	6
Switzerland (Lestander)	10

Sheet E	Final
Finland (Jokela)	4
Sweden (Norberg)	13

=== Draw 2 ===
Sheet A	Final
Scotland (Allison)	2
United States (Lagasse)	5

Sheet B	Final
Finland (Jokela)	3
Germany (Schöpp)	7

Sheet C	Final
Norway (Trulsen)	10
Sweden (Norberg)	6

Sheet D	Final
Denmark (Qvist)	5
Canada (Houston)	8

Sheet E	Final
Switzerland (Lestander)	8
France (Mercier)	3

=== Draw 3 ===
Sheet A	Final
Switzerland (Lestander)	5
Germany (Schöpp)	10

Sheet B	Final
Sweden (Norberg)	6
Canada (Houston)	9

Sheet C	Final
France (Mercier)	7
United States (Lagasse)	6

Sheet D	Final
Norway (Trulsen)	13
Finland (Jokela)	1

Sheet E	Final
Denmark (Qvist)	4
Scotland (Allison)	9

=== Draw 4 ===
Sheet A	Final
Canada (Houston)	5
Norway (Trulsen)	6

Sheet B	Final
France (Mercier)	8
Scotland (Allison)	5

Sheet C	Final
Denmark (Qvist)	5
Switzerland (Lestander)	4

Sheet D	Final
Sweden (Norberg)	4
Germany (Schöpp)	6

Sheet E	Final
United States (Lagasse)	9
Finland (Jokela)	8

=== Draw 5 ===
Sheet A	Final
Sweden (Norberg)	6
Denmark (Qvist)	3

Sheet B	Final
Norway (Trulsen)	8
Switzerland (Lestander)	4

Sheet C	Final
Scotland (Allison)	7
Finland (Jokela)	6

Sheet D	Final
Canada (Houston)	9
United States (Lagasse)	3

Sheet E	Final
France (Mercier)	10
Germany (Schöpp)	8

=== Draw 6 ===
Sheet A	Final
France (Mercier)	7
Finland (Jokela)	5

Sheet B	Final
Germany (Schöpp)	6
United States (Lagasse)	2

Sheet C	Final
Switzerland (Lestander)	5
Canada (Houston)	4

Sheet D	Final
Scotland (Allison)	5
Sweden (Norberg)	6

Sheet E	Final
Norway (Trulsen)	7
Denmark (Qvist)	6

=== Draw 7 ===
Sheet A	Final
Germany (Schöpp)	5
Scotland (Allison)	0

Sheet B	Final
Canada (Houston)	7
France (Mercier)	6

Sheet C	Final
United States (Lagasse)	4
Norway (Trulsen)	0

Sheet D	Final
Finland (Jokela)	2
Denmark (Qvist)	8

Sheet E	Final
Sweden (Norberg)	3
Switzerland (Lestander)	4

=== Draw 8 ===
Sheet A	Final
Finland (Jokela)	4
Canada (Houston)	11

Sheet B	Final
United States (Lagasse)	5
Denmark (Qvist)	9

Sheet C	Final
Sweden (Norberg)	7
Scotland (Allison)	4

Sheet D	Final
Switzerland (Lestander)	5
Scotland (Allison)	7

Sheet E	Final
Germany (Schöpp)	5
Norway (Trulsen)	6

=== Draw 9 ===
Sheet A	Final
United States (Lagasse)	4
Sweden (Norberg)	6

Sheet B	Final
Switzerland (Lestander)	11
Finland (Jokela)	2

Sheet C	Final
Germany (Schöpp)	6
Denmark (Qvist)	7

Sheet D	Final
France (Mercier)	2
Norway (Trulsen)	8

Sheet E	Final
Scotland (Allison)	4
Canada (Houston)	10

== Tie breaker ==
Sheet A	Final
France (Mercier)	4
Germany (Schöpp)	6

Sheet B	Final
Sweden (Norberg)	6
Switzerland (Lestander)	5

== Playoffs ==
Semi-final
1	Norway	7
4	Sweden	5
2	Canada	8
3	Germany	5

Final
1	Norway	5
2	Canada	8

=== Semifinals ===
Sheet B	Final
Norway (Trulsen)	7
Sweden (Norberg)	5

Sheet B	Final
Canada (Houston)	8
Germany (Schöpp)	5

=== Finals ===
Sheet B	Final
Norway (Trulsen)	5
Canada (Houston)	8

1989 World Women's Curling Championship
(Canada)
Canada
6th title
