= Jan Lagasse =

American curler

- Curler ♀

Team
- Curling club: Rolla CC, Rolla, North Dakota

Curling career
- Member Association: United States
- World Championship: 1 (1989)
Medal record
Women's curling
United States National Championships
Gold medal – first place	1989 Detroit

Jan Lagasse is an American curler.

At the national level she is a 1989 United States women's champion curler. She competed for the United States at the 1989 World Women's Championship.

== Teams ==
Season	Skip	Third	Second	Lead	Events
1988–89	Jan Lagasse	Janie Kakela	Colleen Bertsch	Eileen Mickelson	USWCC 1989 (gold); WWCC 1989 (9th)

== Ссылки ==
- Turtle Mountain Star January 21, 2013: Page 4 (look at right column «Pages from the past», «30 years ago, January 17, 1983»: «Congratulations to the Rolla Ladies Curling Team of Jan Lagasse, Janie Kakela, Cooky Bertsch, Eileen Mickelson and substitute Holly Heitcamp…»)
