= Diane Adams =

Canadian curler

- Curler

Team
- Curling club: Lakehead Ladies CC, Thunder Bay, ON, Fort William CC, Thunder Bay, ON

Curling career
- Member Association: Ontario
- Hearts: 4 (1988, 1989, 1990, 1991)
- World Championship: 2 (1988, 1989)
Medal record
Curling
Representing Canada
World Championships
| Gold medal – first place | 1989 Milwaukee |
| Silver medal – second place | 1988 Glasgow |
Representing Ontario
Scotties Tournament of Hearts
| Gold medal – first place | 1988 Fredericton |
| Gold medal – first place | 1989 Kelowna |
| Bronze medal – third place | 1990 Ottawa |
| Bronze medal – third place | 1991 Saskatoon |

Diane Adams (née Wolanicki; born c. 1965) is a Canadian curler from Thunder Bay, Ontario.

She is a 1989 World women's champion, 1988 World women's silver medallist and a two-time Canadian women's champion (1988, 1989).

In 1994, she was inducted into Canadian Curling Hall of Fame together with all of the Heather Houston 1988 and 1989 team.

== Personal life ==
Adams grew up in Rainy River, Ontario.

== Teams and events ==
| Season | Skip | Third | Second | Lead | Alternate | Events |
|---|---|---|---|---|---|---|
| 1984–85 | Marion Ball | Madeleine Gilbart | Diane Wolanicki | Lynn Reid | | |
| 1987–88 | Heather Houston | Lorraine Lang | Diane Adams | Tracy Kennedy | Gloria Taylor (STOH) | STOH 1988 (gold); WCC 1988 (silver) |
| 1988–89 | Heather Houston | Lorraine Lang | Diane Adams | Tracy Kennedy | Gloria Taylor | STOH 1989 (gold); WCC 1989 (gold) |
| 1989–90 | Heather Houston | Lorraine Lang | Diane Adams | Tracy Kennedy | Gloria Taylor | STOH 1990 (bronze) |
| 1990–91 | Heather Houston | Lorraine Lang | Diane Adams | Diane Pushkar | Mary Susan Bell | STOH 1991 (bronze) |
| 2001–02 | Diane Adams | Marla Sobush | Angie Delpino | Cindy Orr | | |
