= 1983 Canadian Junior Women's Curling Championship =

- Host city: Calgary, Alberta
- Arena: Calgary Curling Club
- Dates: March 12–19
- Winner: Ontario
- Skip: Alison Goring
- Third: Kristin Holman
- Second: Cheryl McPherson
- Lead: Lynda Armstrong
- Coach: Keith Reilly
- Finalist: Quebec (Debbie Wark)

The 1983 Pepsi Canadian Junior Women's Curling Championship was held March 12–19, 1983 at the Calgary Curling Club in Calgary, Alberta.

After round robin play, Ontario's Alison Goring rink led the field with an 8–2 record, earning the team a direct spot in the final. Following Ontario, there was a three-way tie for second place between Quebec, Manitoba and Saskatchewan. Quebec, who was skipped by Debbie Wark, earned a bye-to the semifinals due to round robin wins over Manitoba and Saskatchewan, while the latter provinces faced off in a tiebreaker to see who would play Quebec. Manitoba won the tiebreaker, but lost to Quebec in the semifinals, earning Quebec the right to play against Ontario in the final.

The Ontario–Quebec final had to be decided by an extra end, with both teams tied at 9 after ten ends. In the extra, Ontario had hammer. On her last stone, Goring attempted a takeout of a Quebec stone. She missed the Quebec stone, but rolled off another Ontario stone, and bounced back for shot rock, giving the team the championship off a fluke shot. It was the first time Ontario won the women's championship, and only the second time a team east of Manitoba won the event.

== Teams ==
The teams were as follows:

Province / Territory	Skip	Third	Second	Lead	Locale
British Columbia	Debbie Ann Lanzo	Karen Donna Evans	Cheryl Lynn Roberts	Leanne Marie Terrace	Vancouver
Alberta	Jennifer Buchanan	Jan Hawkins	Debbie Cutler	Alison Tibbs	Edmonton
Saskatchewan	Michelle Englot	Nadine Ennis	Laura Natalie Couckuyt	Lisa Couckuyt	Montmartre
Manitoba	Laurie Allen	Donna Rae Gould	Faye Irwin	Stacey Dawn Withers	Carman
Ontario	Alison Goring	Kristin Homan	Cheryl McPherson	Lynda Armstrong	Thornhill
Quebec	Debbie Wark	Joanne Milne	Katrina Carmichael	Carolyn Wark	Dollard-des-Ormeaux
New Brunswick	Sheri Smith	Susan Worthen	Terrie Lea Nicholson	Elizabeth Pugh	Fredericton
Nova Scotia	Jennifer Jones	Denise Pelrine	Stephanie Jones	Karen Flemming	Halifax
Prince Edward Island	Nancy Coffin	Pam Sherren	Sharon Cole	Heather Worth	Cornwall
Newfoundland	Charmaine Harris	Gail Burry	Valerie Flight	Marg Merrigan	Buchans
Northwest Territories/Yukon	Debbie Mabbitt	Jana Dormuth	Loreena Potts	Roxanne Bird	Pine Point

== Round robin standings ==
Final standings

Key
Teams to Playoffs
Teams to Tiebreakers

Team	Skip	W	L
Ontario	Alison Goring	8	2
Quebec	Debbie Wark	7	3
Saskatchewan	Michelle Englot	7	3
Manitoba	Laurie Allen	7	3
British Columbia	Debbie Ann Lanzo	6	4
Alberta	Jennifer Buchanan	5	5
Nova Scotia	Jennifer Jones	5	5
Northwest Territories/Yukon	Debbie Mabbitt	4	6
New Brunswick	Sheri Smith	3	7
Prince Edward Island	Nancy Coffin	2	8
Newfoundland	Charmaine Harris	1	9

=== Tiebreaker ===
March 18

Team	1	2	3	4	5	6	7	8	9	10	Final
Manitoba (Allen)	0	1	1	0	2	0	3	0	0	X	7
Saskatchewan (Englot)	0	0	0	2	0	1	0	1	0	X	4

== Playoffs ==
Semifinal			Final
			1	Ontario	9
2	Quebec	8	2	Quebec	8
3	Manitoba	2

=== Semifinal ===
March 19

Team	1	2	3	4	5	6	7	8	9	10	Final
Quebec (Wark)	2	2	1	0	1	1	0	1	X	X	8
Manitoba (Allen)	0	0	0	1	0	0	1	0	X	X	2

=== Final ===
March 19

Team	1	2	3	4	5	6	7	8	9	10	11	Final
Ontario (Goring)	1	0	0	0	3	0	2	0	2	0	1	9
Quebec (Wark)	0	2	2	1	0	1	0	1	0	1	0	8
