= Linda Kirton =

Canadian curler

Linda Kirton (born March 10, 1948) is a Canadian curling official from Abbotsford, British Columbia. She recited the Official's Oath at the 2010 Vancouver Paralympics, alongside Hervé Lord for the Athletes' Oath.

Kirton was a curler for about 40 years, before becoming a curling official in the late 1990s.

Kirton is a member of the Abbotsford Curling Club, where she was inducted as an Honorary Life Member in 2006. She has officiated at a number of National curling events, including the 2002 World Junior Curling Championships. In 2003, she chaired the Canadian Mixed Curling Championship. She was the chief umpire at the World Wheelchair Curling Championship in Switzerland in 2008. At the 2010 Paralympics, she was the assistant chief umpire at the wheelchair curling event.
