= Kim Kelly =

Kim Kelly may refer to:

- Kim Kelly (curler)
- Kim Kelly (journalist)
- Kim Kelly (Freaks and Geeks)
