= 1988 Scott Tournament of Hearts =

Canadian women's curling championship

- Host city: Fredericton, New Brunswick
- Arena: Aitken Centre
- Dates: February 27–March 5
- Attendance: 16,929
- Winner: Ontario
- Curling club: Lakehead Ladies CC, Thunder Bay
- Skip: Heather Houston
- Third: Lorraine Lang
- Second: Diane Adams
- Lead: Tracy Kennedy
- Alternate: Gloria Taylor
- Finalist: Canada (Pat Sanders)

The 1988 Scott Tournament of Hearts, the Canadian women's curling championship, was held from February 27 to March 5, 1988 at the Aitken Centre in Fredericton, New Brunswick. The total attendance for the week was 16,929.

Team Ontario, who was skipped by Heather Houston won the title beating defending champion Pat Sanders and Team Canada 6–5 in the final. Ontario made it to the final after winning two tiebreaker games over Manitoba and British Columbia before beating Saskatchewan 7–4 in the semifinal. This was Ontario's second championship overall and the first of back-to-back championships skipped by Houston. Ontario joined Saskatchewan in 1980 as the only teams to win the title after playing in a tiebreaker game and the first to win a title after winning multiple tiebreaker games since the playoffs were instituted in 1979.

Houston's rink would go onto represent Canada at the 1988 World Women's Curling Championship in Glasgow, Scotland where they took home the silver medal after losing to West Germany in the final.

Prince Edward Island's 3–2 victory over Canada in Draw 13 tied records for the lowest combined score by both teams in one game (5) and the most blank ends in one game (6).

== Teams ==
The teams were listed as follows:

Team Canada	Alberta	British Columbia	Manitoba
Victoria Racquet Club, Victoria Skip: Pat Sanders; Third: Louise Herlinveaux; Second: Georgina Hawkes; Lead: Deb Massullo; Alternate: Elaine Dagg-Jackson	Beaumont CC, Beaumont Skip: Lil Werenka; Third: Simone Handfield; Second: Bev Karasek; Lead: Kathy Bacon; Alternate: Brenda Bohmer-Cassidy	Esquimalt SC, Esquimalt Skip: Chris Stevenson; Third: Cindy Tucker; Second: Diane Nelson; Lead: Sandra Martin; Alternate: Jodie Sutton	Deer Lodge CC, Winnipeg Fourth: Jacki Rintoul; Third: Judy Cochrane; Second: Lois Fast; Skip: Marlene Cleutinx; Alternate: Anna Reagh
New Brunswick	Newfoundland	Nova Scotia	Ontario
Bathurst CC, Bathurst Skip: Karen McDermott; Third: Donna Clinch; Second: Pat Maher; Lead: Shirley Jamieson; Alternate: Ilona Schnarr	St. John's CC, St. John's Skip: Maria Thomas (Note: After Draw 3, Team Newfoundland third Cathy Cunningham threw fourth stones while skip Maria Thomas threw third stones for the remainder of the tournament.); Third: Cathy Cunningham; Second: Peg Goss; Lead: Cathy Efford; Alternate: Laura Phillips	Truro CC, Truro Skip: Judy Burgess; Third: Mary Baird (Note: For the last seven ends of Draw 1, Team Nova Scotia elected to play short handed after third Mary Baird left the game for unknown reasons while lead Karen Hennigar and second Colleen Pinkney each threw three stones.); Second: Colleen Pinkney; Lead: Karen Hennigar; Alternate: Beth Smith	Lakehead Ladies CC, Thunder Bay Skip: Heather Houston; Third: Lorraine Lang; Second: Diane Adams; Lead: Tracy Kennedy; Alternate: Gloria Taylor
Prince Edward Island	Quebec	Saskatchewan	Yukon/Northwest Territories
Montague R.A. Complex, Montague Skip: Jennifer Ramsay; Third: Terry Nicholson; Second: June Moyaert; Lead: Frances McGowan; Alternate: Irene Spriet	Thistle CC, Montreal Skip: Francine Poisson; Third: Sue Martin; Second: Carolyn LeCraw; Lead: Sally Nelthorpe; Alternate: Helene Tousignant	Tartan CC, Regina Skip: Michelle Schneider; Third: Jan Herauf; Second: Lorie Kehler; Lead: Leanne Eberle; Alternate: Kenda Richards	Whitehorse CC, Whitehorse Skip: Shelley Aucoin; Third: Kathy Chapman; Second: Donna Scott; Lead: Debbie Stokes; Alternate: Margaret Lawrence

== Map of teams ==
Team Canada Provincial Winners

== Round Robin standings ==
Final Round Robin standings

Key
Teams to Playoffs
Teams to Tiebreakers

Team	Skip	W	L	PF	PA	EW	EL	BE	SE	S%
Canada	Pat Sanders	9	2	88	50	52	35	0	17	77%
Saskatchewan	Michelle Schneider	9	2	68	50	48	40	12	12	75%
British Columbia	Chris Stevenson	7	4	90	62	48	42	5	17	73%
Manitoba	Marlene Cleutinx	7	4	70	77	46	45	5	15	73%
Ontario	Heather Houston	7	4	81	57	50	37	5	19	76%
Newfoundland	Maria Thomas	6	5	67	69	46	44	5	16	68%
Alberta	Lil Werenka	4	7	57	75	38	50	7	13	64%
New Brunswick	Karen McDermott	4	7	72	73	42	49	3	10	68%
Quebec	Francine Poisson	4	7	80	86	46	45	4	14	69%
Prince Edward Island	Jennifer Ramsay	4	7	51	77	39	49	11	9	67%
Nova Scotia	Judy Burgess	3	8	60	88	42	52	5	11	67%
Yukon/Northwest Territories	Shelley Aucoin	2	9	63	83	40	49	9	10	69%

== Round Robin results ==
All draw times are listed in Atlantic Standard Time (UTC-04:00).

=== Draw 1 ===
Saturday, February 27, 2:00 pm

Sheet A	1	2	3	4	5	6	7	8	9	10	Final
Nova Scotia (Burgess) 🔨	0	1	0	2	0	0	0	0	1	X	4
Ontario (Houston)	0	0	1	0	2	1	4	0	0	X	8

Sheet B	1	2	3	4	5	6	7	8	9	10	Final
Saskatchewan (Schneider) 🔨	2	2	0	0	3	0	1	0	1	X	9
British Columbia (Stevenson)	0	0	1	1	0	1	0	1	0	X	4

Sheet C	1	2	3	4	5	6	7	8	9	10	Final
New Brunswick (McDermott) 🔨	1	0	0	2	1	0	0	1	0	3	8
Prince Edward Island (Ramsay)	0	1	0	0	0	1	1	0	3	0	6

Sheet D	1	2	3	4	5	6	7	8	9	10	Final
Newfoundland (Thomas) 🔨	0	1	0	0	2	0	2	1	0	X	6
Canada (Sanders)	1	0	4	2	0	1	0	0	1	X	9

Sheet E	1	2	3	4	5	6	7	8	9	10	Final
Quebec (Poisson) 🔨	2	0	0	2	0	1	0	1	0	X	6
Yukon/Northwest Territories (Aucoin)	0	1	4	0	1	0	2	0	4	X	12

=== Draw 2 ===
Saturday, February 27, 8:00 pm

Sheet A	1	2	3	4	5	6	7	8	9	10	Final
Quebec (Poisson) 🔨	0	0	1	0	0	2	0	2	1	0	6
Canada (Sanders)	0	2	0	3	1	0	2	0	0	3	11

Sheet B	1	2	3	4	5	6	7	8	9	10	Final
Prince Edward Island (Ramsay) 🔨	2	0	0	0	1	0	1	0	0	3	7
Newfoundland (Thomas)	0	1	1	1	0	0	0	2	0	0	5

Sheet C	1	2	3	4	5	6	7	8	9	10	Final
Ontario (Houston) 🔨	1	1	0	2	0	0	0	1	1	0	6
Yukon/Northwest Territories (Aucoin)	0	0	2	0	1	1	1	0	0	2	7

Sheet D	1	2	3	4	5	6	7	8	9	10	Final
Nova Scotia (Burgess) 🔨	0	2	2	0	0	1	0	1	0	1	7
New Brunswick (McDermott)	1	0	0	1	1	0	1	0	1	0	5

Sheet E	1	2	3	4	5	6	7	8	9	10	Final
Manitoba (Cleutinx)	1	0	0	2	1	0	0	0	2	2	8
Alberta (Werenka) 🔨	0	1	1	0	0	2	2	1	0	0	7

=== Draw 3 ===
Sunday, February 28, 2:00 pm

Sheet A	1	2	3	4	5	6	7	8	9	10	Final
Newfoundland (Thomas) 🔨	0	2	0	1	0	0	1	0	0	X	4
British Columbia (Stevenson)	1	0	3	0	0	3	0	1	2	X	10

Sheet B	1	2	3	4	5	6	7	8	9	10	Final
Alberta (Werenka) 🔨	0	0	1	0	0	0	0	1	0	X	2
Ontario (Houston)	0	0	0	2	0	0	3	0	2	X	7

Sheet C	1	2	3	4	5	6	7	8	9	10	Final
Canada (Sanders) 🔨	1	0	3	0	1	1	0	2	1	X	9
Saskatchewan (Schneider)	0	1	0	1	0	0	1	0	0	X	3

Sheet D	1	2	3	4	5	6	7	8	9	10	Final
Manitoba (Cleutinx) 🔨	0	2	0	0	1	0	2	2	0	X	7
Yukon/Northwest Territories (Aucoin)	1	0	0	2	0	1	0	0	2	X	6

Sheet E	1	2	3	4	5	6	7	8	9	10	11	Final
Nova Scotia (Burgess) 🔨	2	0	1	0	0	1	0	2	1	0	0	7
Quebec (Poisson)	0	0	0	2	1	0	3	0	0	1	4	11

=== Draw 4 ===
Sunday, February 28, 8:00 pm

Sheet A	1	2	3	4	5	6	7	8	9	10	Final
Yukon/Northwest Territories (Aucoin) 🔨	0	1	0	0	1	0	0	0	0	X	2
Saskatchewan (Schneider)	1	0	1	1	0	0	1	1	0	X	5

Sheet B	1	2	3	4	5	6	7	8	9	10	Final
Quebec (Poisson)	4	0	2	1	1	0	1	1	0	X	10
New Brunswick (McDermott)	0	1	0	0	0	3	0	0	1	X	5

Sheet C	1	2	3	4	5	6	7	8	9	10	11	Final
Newfoundland (Thomas)	0	1	0	2	0	0	1	0	1	1	0	6
Manitoba (Cleutinx) 🔨	0	0	1	0	2	1	0	2	0	0	1	7

Sheet D	1	2	3	4	5	6	7	8	9	10	Final
Prince Edward Island (Ramsay) 🔨	1	0	1	0	1	0	0	0	X	X	3
British Columbia (Stevenson)	0	3	0	1	0	2	3	2	X	X	11

Sheet E	1	2	3	4	5	6	7	8	9	10	Final
Canada (Sanders) 🔨	2	2	2	0	1	1	X	X	X	X	8
Alberta (Werenka)	0	0	0	1	0	0	X	X	X	X	1

=== Draw 5 ===
Monday, February 29, 9:30 am

Sheet C	1	2	3	4	5	6	7	8	9	10	11	Final
Prince Edward Island (Ramsay) 🔨	4	0	1	0	1	0	0	0	0	0	1	7
Nova Scotia (Burgess)	0	1	0	1	0	1	1	1	0	1	0	6

Sheet D	1	2	3	4	5	6	7	8	9	10	Final
Ontario (Houston)	1	0	1	0	0	2	0	2	1	1	8
New Brunswick (McDermott) 🔨	0	1	0	0	3	0	1	0	0	0	5

=== Draw 6 ===
Monday, February 29, 2:00 pm

Sheet A	1	2	3	4	5	6	7	8	9	10	Final
New Brunswick (McDermott) 🔨	1	0	1	0	0	0	1	0	X	X	3
Newfoundland (Thomas)	0	3	0	2	1	2	0	1	X	X	9

Sheet B	1	2	3	4	5	6	7	8	9	10	Final
Yukon/Northwest Territories (Aucoin) 🔨	2	0	0	2	1	0	0	0	2	0	7
Alberta (Werenka)	0	3	2	0	0	2	0	0	0	1	8

Sheet C	1	2	3	4	5	6	7	8	9	10	Final
Canada (Sanders) 🔨	2	0	2	0	1	0	0	1	0	1	7
British Columbia (Stevenson)	0	2	0	1	0	0	1	0	2	0	6

Sheet D	1	2	3	4	5	6	7	8	9	10	Final
Quebec (Poisson) 🔨	2	0	3	0	2	0	2	0	5	X	14
Manitoba (Cleutinx)	0	2	0	1	0	2	0	4	0	X	9

Sheet E	1	2	3	4	5	6	7	8	9	10	Final
Prince Edward Island (Ramsay) 🔨	1	0	1	0	0	0	0	1	0	X	3
Saskatchewan (Schneider)	0	2	0	1	1	2	1	0	1	X	8

=== Draw 7 ===
Monday, February 29, 8:00 pm

Sheet A	1	2	3	4	5	6	7	8	9	10	Final
British Columbia (Stevenson) 🔨	0	0	2	0	0	5	1	0	3	X	11
Yukon/Northwest Territories (Aucoin)	1	3	0	1	2	0	0	1	0	X	8

Sheet B	1	2	3	4	5	6	7	8	9	10	Final
Manitoba (Cleutinx) 🔨	1	0	1	0	2	0	3	0	0	X	7
Canada (Sanders)	0	1	0	1	0	1	0	1	1	X	5

Sheet C	1	2	3	4	5	6	7	8	9	10	Final
Alberta (Werenka) 🔨	0	0	0	0	2	4	0	2	0	0	8
Quebec (Poisson)	1	1	1	1	0	0	1	0	1	1	7

Sheet D	1	2	3	4	5	6	7	8	9	10	Final
Ontario (Houston) 🔨	1	0	0	1	0	2	0	1	0	1	6
Saskatchewan (Schneider)	0	3	1	0	1	0	1	0	1	0	7

Sheet E	1	2	3	4	5	6	7	8	9	10	Final
Newfoundland (Thomas) 🔨	2	0	0	0	0	2	2	0	0	1	7
Nova Scotia (Burgess)	0	2	0	1	2	0	0	0	1	0	6

=== Draw 8 ===
Tuesday, March 1, 9:30 am

Sheet B	1	2	3	4	5	6	7	8	9	10	Final
Newfoundland (Thomas) 🔨	0	0	0	2	2	1	1	0	0	X	6
Quebec (Poisson)	1	0	1	0	0	0	0	0	2	X	4

Sheet C	1	2	3	4	5	6	7	8	9	10	Final
Yukon/Northwest Territories (Aucoin) 🔨	0	0	2	0	0	0	1	0	1	X	4
Canada (Sanders)	0	0	0	3	1	1	0	2	0	X	7

=== Draw 9 ===
Tuesday, March 1, 2:00 pm

Sheet A	1	2	3	4	5	6	7	8	9	10	Final
Prince Edward Island (Ramsay) 🔨	0	0	1	1	0	0	0	1	0	0	3
Manitoba (Cleutinx)	0	1	0	0	0	1	0	0	2	1	5

Sheet B	1	2	3	4	5	6	7	8	9	10	Final
New Brunswick (McDermott) 🔨	3	0	0	0	2	1	3	X	X	X	9
Yukon/Northwest Territories (Aucoin)	0	0	0	1	0	0	0	X	X	X	1

Sheet C	1	2	3	4	5	6	7	8	9	10	Final
Saskatchewan (Schneider) 🔨	1	0	0	0	0	0	2	1	0	0	4
Newfoundland (Thomas)	0	1	0	1	1	0	0	0	1	1	5

Sheet D	1	2	3	4	5	6	7	8	9	10	Final
Nova Scotia (Burgess)	0	1	0	0	1	0	1	0	1	2	6
Alberta (Werenka) 🔨	1	0	1	1	0	1	0	1	0	0	5

Sheet E	1	2	3	4	5	6	7	8	9	10	Final
Ontario (Houston)	1	1	0	0	2	0	2	1	0	1	8
British Columbia (Stevenson) 🔨	0	0	1	1	0	3	0	0	1	0	6

=== Draw 10 ===
Tuesday, March 1, 8:00 pm

Sheet A	1	2	3	4	5	6	7	8	9	10	Final
Saskatchewan (Schneider) 🔨	1	0	0	2	0	1	1	0	1	X	6
Alberta (Werenka)	0	2	0	0	1	0	0	1	0	X	4

Sheet B	1	2	3	4	5	6	7	8	9	10	Final
Ontario (Houston) 🔨	0	0	0	2	1	1	0	2	1	0	7
Manitoba (Cleutinx)	1	1	2	0	0	0	3	0	0	1	8

Sheet C	1	2	3	4	5	6	7	8	9	10	Final
British Columbia (Stevenson) 🔨	0	2	1	0	2	2	5	X	X	X	12
Nova Scotia (Burgess)	1	0	0	2	0	0	0	X	X	X	3

Sheet D	1	2	3	4	5	6	7	8	9	10	Final
Quebec (Poisson) 🔨	3	0	4	0	2	0	3	X	X	X	12
Prince Edward Island (Ramsay)	0	1	0	1	0	1	0	X	X	X	3

Sheet E	1	2	3	4	5	6	7	8	9	10	Final
Canada (Sanders)	0	0	0	3	0	2	1	1	0	1	8
New Brunswick (McDermott) 🔨	0	1	1	0	2	0	0	0	2	0	6

=== Draw 11 ===
Wednesday, March 2, 9:30 am

Sheet C	1	2	3	4	5	6	7	8	9	10	Final
Saskatchewan (Schneider) 🔨	0	2	0	0	0	0	1	0	0	2	5
Manitoba (Cleutinx)	0	0	0	2	0	0	0	1	0	0	3

Sheet D	1	2	3	4	5	6	7	8	9	10	Final
British Columbia (Stevenson) 🔨	0	1	0	2	1	0	0	0	0	0	4
Alberta (Werenka)	1	0	0	0	0	0	2	0	1	2	6

=== Draw 12 ===
Wednesday, March 2, 2:00 pm

Sheet A	1	2	3	4	5	6	7	8	9	10	Final
Ontario (Houston) 🔨	0	4	0	2	3	2	X	X	X	X	11
Quebec (Poisson)	0	0	1	0	0	0	X	X	X	X	1

Sheet B	1	2	3	4	5	6	7	8	9	10	Final
Canada (Sanders) 🔨	3	2	0	1	1	0	2	3	X	X	12
Nova Scotia (Burgess)	0	0	2	0	0	1	0	0	X	X	3

Sheet C	1	2	3	4	5	6	7	8	9	10	Final
Newfoundland (Thomas) 🔨	0	1	0	3	0	1	0	0	0	2	7
Alberta (Werenka)	1	0	2	0	2	0	0	1	0	0	6

Sheet D	1	2	3	4	5	6	7	8	9	10	Final
New Brunswick (McDermott) 🔨	0	0	0	0	4	0	0	1	0	4	9
Manitoba (Cleutinx)	1	1	1	2	0	0	1	0	1	0	7

Sheet E	1	2	3	4	5	6	7	8	9	10	Final
Yukon/Northwest Territories (Aucoin) 🔨	1	0	1	0	0	0	2	0	0	X	4
Prince Edward Island (Ramsay)	0	1	0	1	0	1	0	3	2	X	8

=== Draw 13 ===
Wednesday, March 2, 8:00 pm

Sheet A	1	2	3	4	5	6	7	8	9	10	11	Final
Canada (Sanders) 🔨	1	0	0	0	0	1	0	0	0	0	0	2
Prince Edward Island (Ramsay)	0	0	0	1	1	0	0	0	0	0	1	3

Sheet B	1	2	3	4	5	6	7	8	9	10	Final
British Columbia (Stevenson) 🔨	4	0	0	2	1	0	1	0	0	1	9
New Brunswick (McDermott)	0	3	1	0	0	3	0	1	0	0	8

Sheet C	1	2	3	4	5	6	7	8	9	10	Final
Nova Scotia (Burgess) 🔨	0	0	0	3	0	1	1	0	0	2	7
Yukon/Northwest Territories (Aucoin)	0	1	2	0	1	0	0	1	0	0	5

Sheet D	1	2	3	4	5	6	7	8	9	10	Final
Quebec (Poisson)	0	1	0	1	0	0	2	0	1	0	5
Saskatchewan (Schneider) 🔨	0	0	1	0	2	0	0	3	0	1	7

Sheet E	1	2	3	4	5	6	7	8	9	10	Final
Ontario (Houston)	0	1	1	0	0	0	2	0	2	X	6
Newfoundland (Thomas) 🔨	0	0	0	1	0	0	0	2	0	X	3

=== Draw 14 ===
Thursday, March 3, 2:00 pm

Sheet A	1	2	3	4	5	6	7	8	9	10	Final
Manitoba (Cleutinx) 🔨	1	0	0	1	0	0	3	0	1	1	7
Nova Scotia (Burgess)	0	2	0	0	0	1	0	2	0	0	5

Sheet B	1	2	3	4	5	6	7	8	9	10	Final
Alberta (Werenka) 🔨	0	0	2	2	1	1	0	0	1	X	7
Prince Edward Island (Ramsay)	1	1	0	0	0	0	1	1	0	X	4

Sheet C	1	2	3	4	5	6	7	8	9	10	Final
British Columbia (Stevenson)	1	2	0	1	0	1	0	0	2	X	7
Quebec (Poisson) 🔨	0	0	2	0	1	0	1	0	0	X	4

Sheet D	1	2	3	4	5	6	7	8	9	10	Final
Canada (Sanders) 🔨	2	0	3	0	0	2	0	3	X	X	10
Ontario (Houston)	0	2	0	0	1	0	2	0	X	X	5

Sheet E	1	2	3	4	5	6	7	8	9	10	Final
Saskatchewan (Schneider) 🔨	0	1	0	2	0	1	0	0	1	X	5
New Brunswick (McDermott)	0	0	1	0	1	0	1	0	0	X	3

=== Draw 15 ===
Thursday, March 3, 8:00 pm

Sheet A	1	2	3	4	5	6	7	8	9	10	Final
Alberta (Werenka) 🔨	0	1	0	0	2	0	0	X	X	X	3
New Brunswick (McDermott)	1	0	3	1	0	3	3	X	X	X	11

Sheet B	1	2	3	4	5	6	7	8	9	10	Final
Nova Scotia (Burgess)	1	0	1	0	4	0	0	0	0	X	6
Saskatchewan (Schneider) 🔨	0	2	0	2	0	0	2	2	1	X	9

Sheet C	1	2	3	4	5	6	7	8	9	10	Final
Prince Edward Island (Ramsay) 🔨	0	1	0	0	2	0	1	0	0	X	4
Ontario (Houston)	2	0	1	2	0	2	0	2	0	X	9

Sheet D	1	2	3	4	5	6	7	8	9	10	Final
Yukon/Northwest Territories (Aucoin) 🔨	0	2	0	1	0	2	0	0	2	0	7
Newfoundland (Thomas)	3	0	1	0	1	0	1	1	0	2	9

Sheet E	1	2	3	4	5	6	7	8	9	10	Final
Manitoba (Cleutinx) 🔨	1	0	0	1	0	0	X	X	X	X	2
British Columbia (Stevenson)	0	2	1	0	3	4	X	X	X	X	10

== Tiebreakers ==
			To Semifinal
			1	British Columbia	4
2	Manitoba	4		Ontario	10
3	Ontario	5

=== Round 1 ===
Friday, March 4, 9:30 am

Sheet D	1	2	3	4	5	6	7	8	9	10	Final
Manitoba (Cleutinx) 🔨	0	0	2	0	0	1	0	1	0	X	4
Ontario (Houston)	1	0	0	2	1	0	1	0	0	X	5

Player percentages
Manitoba		Ontario	
Marlene Cleutinx	79%	Tracy Kennedy	90%
Lois Fast	70%	Diane Adams	86%
Judy Cochrane	84%	Lorraine Lang	71%
Jacki Rintoul	50%	Heather Houston	79%
Total	71%	Total	82%

=== Round 2 ===
Friday, March 4, 2:00 pm

Sheet B	1	2	3	4	5	6	7	8	9	10	Final
Ontario (Houston) 🔨	3	0	3	0	2	1	0	1	X	X	10
British Columbia (Stevenson)	0	1	0	1	0	0	2	0	X	X	4

Player percentages
Ontario		British Columbia	
Tracy Kennedy	83%	Sandra Martin	80%
Diane Adams	64%	Diane Nelson	81%
Lorraine Lang	63%	Cindy Tucker	69%
Heather Houston	93%	Chris Stevenson	55%
Total	75%	Total	71%

== Playoffs ==
Semifinal			Final
			1	Canada	5
2	Saskatchewan	4	2	Ontario	6
3	Ontario	7

=== Semifinal ===
Friday, March 4, 8:00 pm

Sheet C	1	2	3	4	5	6	7	8	9	10	Final
Saskatchewan (Schneider) 🔨	0	1	0	1	1	0	0	1	0	X	4
Ontario (Houston)	1	0	2	0	0	2	0	0	2	X	7

Player percentages
Saskatchewan		Ontario	
Leanne Eberle	80%	Tracy Kennedy	84%
Lorie Kehler	73%	Diane Adams	59%
Jan Herauf	68%	Lorraine Lang	73%
Michelle Schneider	68%	Heather Houston	80%
Total	72%	Total	74%

=== Final ===
Saturday, March 5, 2:00 pm

Sheet C	1	2	3	4	5	6	7	8	9	10	Final
Canada (Sanders) 🔨	1	0	0	0	0	3	1	0	0	0	5
Ontario (Houston)	0	2	1	0	1	0	0	1	0	1	6

Player percentages
Canada		Ontario	
Deb Massullo	71%	Tracy Kennedy	80%
Georgina Hawkes	70%	Diane Adams	80%
Louise Herlinveaux	59%	Lorraine Lang	68%
Pat Sanders	66%	Heather Houston	74%
Total	67%	Total	75%

== Statistics ==
=== Top 5 player percentages ===
Final Round Robin Percentages

Key
All-Star Team

Leads	%
(Ontario) Tracy Kennedy	82
(Canada) Deb Massullo	80
(Saskatchewan) Leanne Eberle	77
(British Columbia) Sandra Martin	74
(Yukon) Debbie Stokes	74

Seconds	%
(Canada) Georgina Hawkes	79
(Manitoba) Lois Fast	77
(Saskatchewan) Lorie Kehler	76
(Ontario) Diane Adams	72
(Yukon) Donna Scott	72

Thirds	%
(Ontario) Lorraine Lang	76
(Canada) Louise Herlinveaux	76
(British Columbia) Cindy Tucker	74
(Manitoba) Judy Cochrane	74
(Saskatchewan) Joan Herauf	72

Skips	%
(Saskatchewan) Michelle Schneider	77
(Canada) Pat Sanders	76
(British Columbia) Chris Stevenson	75
(Newfoundland and Labrador) Cathy Cunningham (Fourth) (Note: Cunningham's shot percentage includes the first three draws where she threw third stones.)	73
(Ontario) Heather Houston	73

== Awards ==
The all-star team and sportsmanship award winners were as follows:

=== All-Star Team ===
Position	Name	Team
Skip	Michelle Schneider	Saskatchewan
Third	Cindy Tucker	British Columbia
Second	Georgina Hawkes	Canada
Lead	Tracy Kennedy	Ontario

=== Caroline Ball Award ===
The Scotties Tournament of Hearts Sportsmanship Award is presented to the curler who best embodies the spirit of curling at the Scotties Tournament of Hearts. The winner was selected in a vote by all players at the tournament.

Prior to 1998, the award was named after a notable individual in the curling community where the tournament was held that year. For this edition, the award was named after Caroline Ball, who competed in the women's national championship four times for Newfoundland along with serving as president of the Canadian Ladies Curling Association.

Name	Team	Position
Mary Baird	Nova Scotia	Third
