= Cheryl McPherson =

Canadian female curler and coach

- Curler
- Born: November 10, 1963 (age 63); Toronto, Ontario

Team
- Curling club: Bayview G&CC, Thornhill, ON; Galt CC, Cambridge, ON

Curling career
- Member Association: Ontario
- Hearts: 4 (1990, 1991, 2003, 2015)
- World Championship: 1 (1990)
Medal record
Curling
Representing Canada
World Championships
Bronze medal – third place	1990 Västerås
Representing Ontario
Scotties Tournament of Hearts
Gold medal – first place	1990 Ottawa

Cheryl McPherson (born November 10, 1963) is a Canadian curler from Thornhill, Ontario.

She is a 1990 World women's bronze medallist and 1990 Canadian women's champion.

She began curling at age 10.

== Awards ==
- STOH All-Star Team: 1991

== Teams and events ==
=== Women's ===
Season	Skip	Third	Second	Lead	Alternate	Coach	Events
1981–82	Alison Goring	Kristin Holman	Cheryl McPherson	Lynda Armstrong			CJCC 1982 (silver)
1982–83	Alison Goring	Kristin Holman	Cheryl McPherson	Lynda Armstrong			CJCC 1983 (gold)
1989–90	Alison Goring	Kristin Turcotte	Andrea Lawes	Cheryl McPherson	Anne Merklinger		STOH 1990 (gold); WCC 1990 (bronze)
1990–91	Alison Goring	Kristin Turcotte	Andrea Lawes	Cheryl McPherson	Anne Merklinger		STOH 1991 (6th)
2002–03	Anne Dunn	Lindy Marchuk	Gloria Campbell	Fran Todd	Cheryl McPherson	Lynn Reynolds	STOH 2003 (9th)
2003–04	Cheryl McPherson	Brenda O'Hara	Jayne Flinn-Burton	Andra Aldred			
2004–05	Jo-Ann Rizzo	Cheryl McPherson	Kimberly Tuck	Sara Gatchell			
2005–06	Jo-Ann Rizzo	Cheryl McPherson	Kimberly Tuck	Sara Gatchell	Jayne Flinn-Burton	Scott Arnold	COCT 2005 (9th)
2008–09	Cathy Auld (fourth)	Cheryl McPherson	Jennifer Issler	Alison Goring (skip)			
2009–10	Cathy Auld	Cheryl McPherson	Melissa Foster	Mary Chilvers			
2010–11	Cheryl McPherson (fourth)	Karen Bell	Stephanie Corrado	Alison Goring (skip)			
2011–12	Cheryl McPherson (fourth)	Catherine Kaino	Mallory Kean	Alison Goring (skip)			
2013–14	Julie Hastings	Cheryl McPherson	Stacey Smith	Katrina Collins			
2014–15	Julie Hastings	Christy Trombley	Stacey Smith	Katrina Collins	Cheryl McPherson	Jim Anderson	STOH 2015 (6th)
2015–16	Julie Hastings	Christy Trombley	Stacey Smith	Katrina Collins	Cheryl McPherson		
2018–19	Cheryl McPherson (fourth)	Mary Chilvers	Cheryl Maloney	Alison Goring (skip)			

=== Mixed ===
Season	Skip	Third	Second	Lead	Events
1986–87	Scott McPherson	Cheryl McPherson	Stu Garner	Kristin Holman	CMxCC 1987
1997–98	Dean Wadland	Cheryl McPherson	Paul Wadland	Marian Arai	CMxCC 1998 (silver)
