= Lorraine Lang =

Canadian curler

Medal record

Curling

World Curling Championships
Gold medal – first place	1989 Milwaukee	
Silver medal – second place	1988 Glasgow	

Scotties Tournament of Hearts
Gold medal – first place	1988 Fredericton	
Gold medal – first place	1989 Kelowna	
Bronze medal – third place	1990 Ottawa	
Bronze medal – third place	1991 Saskatoon	

Canadian Olympic Curling Trials
Bronze medal – third place	2009 Edmonton	

Lorraine Lang (born October 8, 1956, Port Arthur, Ontario as Lorraine Edwards) is a Canadian curler from Thunder Bay, Ontario. Lang is a two-time Tournament of Hearts champion and World Champion.

== Curling career ==
In 1981, Lang won the Canadian Mixed Curling Championship playing lead for her future husband Rick Lang.

Lang played in her first Scott Tournament of Hearts in 1983 as a third for Anne Provo. The team finished 4–6. She returned to the Hearts in 1988 as Heather Houston's third. At the 1988 Hearts, the team had to win two tie-breakers before winning two playoff games to claim the championship. They defeated the defending champion Pat Sanders. At the 1988 World Championships, the team won the silver medal, losing to Germany's Andrea Schöpp in the final. The Hearts victory gave them a berth at the 1989 Scott Tournament of Hearts. The team would go on to win that as well. They had to win three playoff games before beating Chris More of Manitoba in the final.

At the 1989 World Championships, they avenged their silver medal by defeating Trine Trulsen of Norway in the final. Their Hearts victory in 1989 qualified them for the 1990 Scott Tournament of Hearts. They were not able to win for a third straight year, however as they lost to Alison Goring of Ontario in the semi-final. The team returned to the Hearts in 1991 as Team Ontario. The team lost to Heidi Hanlon of New Brunswick in the semi-final. It would be Lang's last Hearts until 2006 when she played lead for Krista McCarville. At the 2006 Scott Tournament of Hearts, the team finished with a 4–7 record, out of the playoffs. She returned with McCarville to the 2007 Scotties Tournament of Hearts where the finished with a 6–5 record and lost in a tie-breaker. She played in her last Scotties in 2009. After the McCarville rink won the bronze medal at the 2009 Canadian Olympic Curling Trials, Lang retired from curling.

== Personal life ==
Lang works as a medical radiation technology program coordinator at Confederation College. She is married to Rick Lang and has two children, including Sarah Potts.
