= Heather Houston =

Canadian curler

Medal record

Representing Canada

Women's Curling

World championships
Gold medal – first place	1989 Milwaukee	Team
Silver medal – second place	1988 Glasgow	Team

Scotties Tournament of Hearts
Gold medal – first place	1988 Fredericton	
Gold medal – first place	1989 Kelowna	
Bronze medal – third place	1990 Ottawa	
Bronze medal – third place	1991 Saskatoon	

Heather E. Houston (born February 4, 1959) is a Canadian curler and world champion. She is from Red Rock, Ontario and curls out of the Fort William Curling Club in Thunder Bay, Ontario.

== Curling career ==
Houston won the 1988 and 1991 Ontario Scotties Tournament of Hearts, skipping her team.

She made her Scotties debut at the 1988 Scott Tournament of Hearts. The team had to win two tie-breakers before winning two playoff games to claim the championship. They defeated the defending champion Pat Sanders.

At the 1988 World Championships, the team won the silver medal, losing to Germany's Andrea Schöpp in the final. The Hearts victory gave them a berth at the 1989 Scott Tournament of Hearts. The team would go on to win that as well. They had to win three playoff games before beating Chris More of Manitoba in the final.

At the 1989 World Championships, they avenged their silver medal by defeating Trine Trulsen of Norway in the final. Their Hearts victory in 1989 qualified them for the 1990 Scott Tournament of Hearts.

She received bronze at the Scotties Tournament of Hearts in 1990 and 1991. She was Champion skip at the 1996 TSN Skins Game.

== Awards ==
Heather Houston received the Velma Springstead Trophy in 1989.

The Houston team was inducted into the Northwestern Sports Hall of Fame in 1994. This same year they were also inducted into the Canadian Curling Hall of Fame.

== Personal life ==
In 1988, Houston was a graphic artist with the Lakehead Board of Education. She is the daughter of Tom and Florence Houston.
