= Dakota Collegiate =

Location
- 661 Dakota Street; Winnipeg, Manitoba, R2M 3K3; Canada; 49.8352°N 97.1093°W

Information
- School type: Public, Secondary school
- Motto: Instare Veritatem Virtute Praestare (Seek the truth, Strive for excellence)
- Founded: 1963
- School board: Louis Riel School Division
- Superintendent: Christian Michalik
- Principal: Jill Mathez
- Grades: Grades 9–12
- Enrollment: 1608
- Language: English
- Colours: Black and Gold
- Team name: Lancers
- Website: School Website

Dakota Collegiate is a grade 9 to 12 public high school in Winnipeg, Manitoba, Canada with an enrollment of 1235 students as of January 2020. Dakota offers Advanced Placement courses in limited subject areas, that include mathematics and the sciences. On May 3, 2014, the school celebrated its 50th anniversary.

== History ==
Dakota Collegiate opened in 1963 with 200 students and 20 teachers. In June 1964, there were 72 students in the first graduating class. Dakota began as an experimental team-teaching school and offered only University Entrance courses. Dakota now has roughly 1200 students, approximately 60 teachers, and offers over 120 courses. In 2012, it had a graduating class of roughly 280 students.

The Dakota Collegiate Lancers have earned 590 provincial sports titles since the school was founded.

=== 21st Century Learning 1:1 Initiative ===
During the 2011-2012 school year, Dakota Collegiate introduced the 21st Century Learning One-to-One initiative, in which all grade nine students were required to purchase their own laptop computer to use in their classes. The computers were used to complete assignments, create presentations, and research information. This initiative continued in the 2012-2013 school year, with grade 9 and 10 students requiring laptops, and an open invitation for students in higher grades to bring their own devices if they desire.

=== Murray Field ===
After 54 years of Dakota Collegiate's opening, the school never played a single home football game until the school raised money for "the field of creams" project. The school started fund raising money in late 2015 for a brand new football field, outdoor basketball court and a cricket pitch. Dakota finished the project in late 2017. It took over $3,000,000 to complete building the football field, and it took over $180,000 to complete the basketball court. Fundraising for the project was through gala dinners with guest speakers such as Troy Westwood, Matt Dunigan, Milt Stegall, Rod Hill, Dale Hawerchuk, Mark Scheifele, Jon Montgomery, and Donovan Bailey. The field got its name from a $250,000 donation from the family of auto dealer Dan Murray. The basketball court was named after former Dakota Collegiate coach and teacher Dale Bradshaw. Between 1968 and 1982, Bradshaw coached Dakota Collegiate to five provincial basketball titles. In 2019, it was announced that the city of Winnipeg would be funding two new tennis and pickleball courts. The courts grand opening was held on October 5, 2020.

== Notable alumni ==
- Janet Arnott, curling coach, 2014 Winter Olympics gold medallist
- Kate Cameron, curler
- Ty Dilello, curler and author
- Monica Goermann, gymnast
- Elijah Harper, politician
- Brad Katona, UFC fighter
- Scott Koskie, Setter for the Canadian National Men's Volleyball Team (1995–2007)
- Connie Laliberte, curler
- Tricia Mayba, professional volleyball player
- Dylan McIlrath, NHL player
- Briane Meilleur, curler
- Theresa Oswald, politician
- Corinne Peters, curler
- Shai Ross, professional football player
- Susan Waycik, Managing Director of The Second City Toronto
