= Barbara Jones-Gordon =

Canadian female curler

- Curler ♀
- Other names: Barb
- Born: Barbara Jones

Team
- Curling club: Halifax CC, Mayflower CC

Curling career
- Member Association: Nova Scotia
- Hearts: 5: (1979, 1980, 1982, 1984, 1986)
- World Championship: 1 (1982)
Medal record
Curling
Representing Nova Scotia
Scott Tournament of Hearts
Gold medal – first place	1982 Regina
Silver medal – second place	1980 Edmonton
Silver medal – second place	1984 Charlottetown

Barbara Jones-Gordon (née Jones; born c. 1955) is a Canadian curler.

She is 1982 Scott Tournament of Hearts champion.

== Awards ==
- STOH All-Star Team: 1982.

== Teams ==
Season	Skip	Third	Second	Lead	Alternate	Events
1979–80	Colleen Jones	Sally Jane Saunders	Margaret Knickle	Barbara Jones		STOH 1980 (silver)
1981–82	Colleen Jones	Kay Smith	Monica Jones	Barbara Jones-Gordon		STOH 1982 (gold); WCC 1982 (5th)
1983–84	Colleen Jones	Wendy Currie	Monica Jones	Barbara Jones-Gordon		STOH 1984 (silver)
1985–86	Colleen Jones	Penny LaRocque	Cathy Caudle	Susan Robinson	Barbara Jones-Gordon	STOH 1986 (8th)

== Personal life ==
Barbara Jones-Gordon is a sister of former teammates Colleen Jones and Monica Moriarty (née Jones). As of the 1982 Hearts, she was employed as a lawyer.
