= 1984 Scott Tournament of Hearts =

Canadian women's curling championship

- Host city: Charlottetown, Prince Edward Island
- Arena: Charlottetown Forum
- Dates: February 25–March 3
- Attendance: 24,131
- Winner: Manitoba
- Curling club: Fort Rouge CC, Winnipeg
- Skip: Connie Laliberte
- Third: Chris More
- Second: Corinne Peters
- Lead: Janet Arnott
- Finalist: Nova Scotia (Colleen Jones)

The 1984 Scott Tournament of Hearts, the Canadian women's national curling championship, was played February 25 to March 3, 1984 at the Charlottetown Forum in Charlottetown, Prince Edward Island. The total attendance for the week was a then-record 24,131.

Team Manitoba, who was skipped by Connie Laliberte won the event as they defeated two-time defending champion Nova Scotia in the final 5–4. Manitoba advanced to the final after beating British Columbia in the semifinal 5–4. This was Manitoba's third championship overall and the first of three championships skipped by Laliberte. The Laliberte rink would go onto represent Canada in the 1984 World Women's Curling Championship held in Perth, Scotland, which they also won.

The record for most stolen ends by a team in one game of five set in 1982 was matched twice during the event. Nova Scotia was the first to do this in Draw 7 as they stole the first five ends of their game against Prince Edward Island in an 8–1 victory. Nova Scotia would fall victim to the same feat two draws later when Saskatchewan stole the second through sixth ends en route to an 8–2 victory.

== Teams ==
The teams were listed as follows:

Alberta	British Columbia	Manitoba	New Brunswick
North Hill CC, Calgary Skip: Connie Bennett; Third: Mavis Roland; Second: Judy Carr; Lead: Betty Clarke	North Shore CC, North Vancouver Skip: Lindsay Sparkes; Third: Linda Moore; Second: Debbie Orr; Lead: Laurie Carney	Fort Rouge CC, Winnipeg Skip: Connie Laliberte; Third: Chris More; Second: Corinne Peters; Lead: Janet Arnott	Thistle St. Andrews CC, Saint John Skip: Anne Leahy; Third: Kathy Floyd (Note: Team New Brunswick third Kathy Floyd missed Draw 9 for unknown reasons. Floyd was replaced by local curler Kathie Gallant, who threw third stones for that draw.); Second: Marion Mackin (Note: Team New Brunswick second Marion Mackin left during Draw 7 for unknown reasons. Mackin was replaced by local curler Kathie Gallant, who threw second stones for the remainder of Draw 7 and all of Draw 8.); Lead: Susan McCarville; Alternate: Kathie Gallant
Newfoundland	Nova Scotia	Ontario	Prince Edward Island
Grand Falls CC, Grand Falls Skip: Catherine Barker; Third: Anita Kelly; Second: Elizabeth James; Lead: Lillian Howse	Halifax CC, Halifax Skip: Colleen Jones; Third: Wendy Currie; Second: Monica Jones; Lead: Barbara Jones-Gordon	Humber Highlands CC, Etobicoke Skip: Jill Greenwood; Third: Yvonne Smith; Second: Cynthia Kane; Lead: Fran Gareau	Silver Fox CC, Summerside Skip: Barbara Currie; Third: Beverley Miller; Second: Ann Currie; Lead: Marlene Noye
Quebec	Saskatchewan	Northwest Territories/Yukon
Buckingham CC, Buckingham Skip: Agnes Charette; Third: Guylaine Deschatelets; Second: Ginette Haspect; Lead: Odette Raby	Sutherland CC, Saskatoon Skip: Lori McGeary; Third: Gillian Thompson; Second: Christine Gervais; Lead: Allison Earl	Yellowknife CC, Yellowknife Skip: Maureen Moss; Third: Kelly Wilson; Second: Tracie Boudreault (Note: Team Northwest Territories/Yukon second Tracie Boudreault missed Draws 6 and 7 due to sore ligaments in her knee. Boudreault was replaced by local curler Wanda Aulenback, who threw second stones for those two draws.); Lead: Melody Flesjer; Alternate: Wanda Aulenback

== Map of teams ==
Provincial Winners

== Round Robin Standings ==
Final Round Robin standings

Key
Teams to Playoffs
Teams to Tiebreakers

Team	Skip	W	L	PF	PA	EW	EL	BE	SE	S%
Nova Scotia	Colleen Jones	9	1	69	41	43	33	9	19	75%
Manitoba	Connie Laliberte	8	2	75	39	49	28	5	19	75%
British Columbia	Lindsay Sparkes	8	2	71	33	45	27	7	18	76%
Saskatchewan	Lori McGeary	8	2	71	50	45	33	10	23	74%
Quebec	Agnes Charette	6	4	59	61	39	44	4	12	71%
Ontario	Jill Greenwood	5	5	61	60	41	44	5	10	72%
Alberta	Connie Bennet	4	6	63	60	39	39	7	12	71%
Prince Edward Island	Barbara Currie	3	7	47	73	36	42	3	14	63%
Newfoundland	Catherine Barker	2	8	44	68	33	46	9	7	64%
Northwest Territories/Yukon	Maureen Moss	1	9	43	86	32	51	1	7	59%
New Brunswick	Anne Leahy	1	9	47	79	34	49	3	8	63%

== Round Robin results ==
=== Draw 1 ===
Saturday, February 25

Sheet A	1	2	3	4	5	6	7	8	9	10	Final
New Brunswick (Leahy)	0	0	1	0	2	0	0	0	0	X	3
Prince Edward Island (Currie) 🔨	0	1	0	1	0	1	1	1	3	X	8

Sheet B	1	2	3	4	5	6	7	8	9	10	Final
Nova Scotia (Jones)	1	0	3	0	0	2	0	2	0	X	6
Manitoba (Laliberte) 🔨	0	1	0	1	0	0	0	0	2	X	4

Sheet C	1	2	3	4	5	6	7	8	9	10	11	Final
Saskatchewan (McGeary)	0	1	2	1	2	1	0	0	0	0	1	8
Northwest Territories/Yukon (Moss) 🔨	1	0	0	0	0	0	2	1	0	3	0	7

Sheet D	1	2	3	4	5	6	7	8	9	10	Final
Quebec (Charette)	1	0	1	0	0	0	5	0	1	1	9
Alberta (Bennet) 🔨	0	1	0	2	1	1	0	1	0	0	6

Sheet E	1	2	3	4	5	6	7	8	9	10	11	Final
Newfoundland (Barker)	0	0	0	0	1	0	0	1	0	1	0	3
British Columbia (Sparks) 🔨	1	0	0	0	0	0	1	0	1	0	1	4

=== Draw 2 ===
Sunday, February 26

Sheet A	1	2	3	4	5	6	7	8	9	10	Final
British Columbia (Sparks) 🔨	1	1	1	0	1	0	1	0	2	X	7
Alberta (Bennet) 🔨	0	0	0	1	0	0	0	2	0	X	3

Sheet B	1	2	3	4	5	6	7	8	9	10	Final
Prince Edward Island (Currie) 🔨	0	1	0	0	0	0	0	2	X	X	3
Saskatchewan (McGeary)	0	0	1	2	3	3	2	0	X	X	11

Sheet C	1	2	3	4	5	6	7	8	9	10	Final
Manitoba (Laliberte) 🔨	1	0	0	0	1	1	0	0	1	0	4
Quebec (Charette)	0	0	0	3	0	0	1	0	0	1	5

Sheet D	1	2	3	4	5	6	7	8	9	10	Final
Northwest Territories/Yukon (Moss) 🔨	1	3	0	1	2	0	1	0	0	0	8
Newfoundland (Barker)	0	0	1	0	0	4	0	2	2	2	11

Sheet E	1	2	3	4	5	6	7	8	9	10	11	Final
Ontario (Greenwood)	1	0	0	0	0	0	2	0	0	1	0	4
Nova Scotia (Jones) 🔨	0	1	1	0	0	1	0	1	0	0	1	5

=== Draw 3 ===
Sunday, February 26

Sheet A	1	2	3	4	5	6	7	8	9	10	Final
Quebec (Charette)	0	1	0	0	0	2	0	1	0	X	4
Ontario (Greenwood) 🔨	1	0	2	1	1	0	2	0	2	X	9

Sheet B	1	2	3	4	5	6	7	8	9	10	Final
Alberta (Bennet)	2	2	0	3	4	1	1	X	X	X	13
Northwest Territories/Yukon (Moss) 🔨	0	0	1	0	0	0	0	X	X	X	1

Sheet C	1	2	3	4	5	6	7	8	9	10	Final
Newfoundland (Barker)	0	0	0	0	1	0	0	X	X	X	1
Prince Edward Island (Currie) 🔨	1	1	1	2	0	3	3	X	X	X	11

Sheet D	1	2	3	4	5	6	7	8	9	10	Final
Manitoba (Laliberte) 🔨	0	3	1	0	0	1	1	0	0	X	6
British Columbia (Sparks)	0	0	0	2	0	0	0	1	1	X	4

Sheet E	1	2	3	4	5	6	7	8	9	10	Final
Saskatchewan (McGeary) 🔨	2	0	0	1	1	0	0	0	1	2	7
New Brunswick (Leahy)	0	2	1	0	0	0	2	1	0	0	6

=== Draw 4 ===
Monday, February 27

Sheet A	1	2	3	4	5	6	7	8	9	10	Final
Northwest Territories/Yukon (Moss)	0	1	0	0	0	0	0	0	X	X	1
Manitoba (Laliberte) 🔨	3	0	0	2	1	1	2	1	X	X	10

Sheet B	1	2	3	4	5	6	7	8	9	10	Final
New Brunswick (Leahy)	0	2	0	1	0	0	0	1	0	X	4
Newfoundland (Barker) 🔨	0	0	2	0	0	1	1	0	2	X	6

Sheet C	1	2	3	4	5	6	7	8	9	10	Final
Ontario (Greenwood) 🔨	1	0	0	1	1	0	1	0	0	X	4
British Columbia (Sparks)	0	2	1	0	0	3	0	1	3	X	10

Sheet D	1	2	3	4	5	6	7	8	9	10	Final
Nova Scotia (Jones)	1	0	1	0	1	1	2	0	0	0	6
Quebec (Charette) 🔨	0	1	0	2	0	0	0	0	1	1	5

Sheet E	1	2	3	4	5	6	7	8	9	10	Final
Prince Edward Island (Currie)	0	0	1	0	0	1	0	1	1	X	4
Alberta (Bennet) 🔨	1	2	0	0	4	0	1	0	0	X	8

=== Draw 5 ===
Monday, February 27

Sheet A	1	2	3	4	5	6	7	8	9	10	Final
Newfoundland (Barker)	0	1	0	0	0	0	1	0	1	0	3
Saskatchewan (McGeary) 🔨	2	0	0	0	0	2	0	0	0	1	5

Sheet B	1	2	3	4	5	6	7	8	9	10	Final
British Columbia (Sparks) 🔨	0	1	0	0	0	2	0	2	0	X	5
Nova Scotia (Jones)	0	0	0	1	2	0	2	0	2	X	7

Sheet C	1	2	3	4	5	6	7	8	9	10	Final
Alberta (Bennet) 🔨	4	0	1	1	0	0	1	0	2	X	9
New Brunswick (Leahy)	0	2	0	0	1	0	0	1	0	X	4

Sheet D	1	2	3	4	5	6	7	8	9	10	Final
Manitoba (Laliberte) 🔨	2	2	2	2	1	0	3	X	X	X	12
Prince Edward Island (Currie)	0	0	0	0	0	1	0	X	X	X	1

Sheet E	1	2	3	4	5	6	7	8	9	10	Final
Northwest Territories/Yukon (Moss)	1	0	1	0	0	1	0	2	0	X	5
Ontario (Greenwood) 🔨	0	1	0	4	1	0	1	0	1	X	8

=== Draw 6 ===
Tuesday, February 28

Sheet A	1	2	3	4	5	6	7	8	9	10	Final
Quebec (Charette)	0	0	1	0	0	1	0	0	1	0	3
British Columbia (Sparks) 🔨	0	0	0	2	0	0	0	3	0	1	6

Sheet B	1	2	3	4	5	6	7	8	9	10	Final
Prince Edward Island (Currie)	0	1	0	1	1	0	0	1	0	0	4
Ontario (Greenwood) 🔨	1	0	2	0	0	1	0	0	0	2	6

Sheet C	1	2	3	4	5	6	7	8	9	10	Final
Nova Scotia (Jones) 🔨	5	0	3	0	0	0	2	X	X	X	10
Northwest Territories/Yukon (Moss)	0	1	0	1	0	0	0	X	X	X	2

Sheet D	1	2	3	4	5	6	7	8	9	10	Final
Saskatchewan (McGeary)	0	3	0	0	0	3	1	0	0	0	7
Alberta (Bennet) 🔨	1	0	0	1	2	0	0	2	0	0	6

Sheet E	1	2	3	4	5	6	7	8	9	10	Final
New Brunswick (Leahy)	0	2	0	0	1	0	1	1	0	X	5
Manitoba (Laliberte) 🔨	1	0	1	2	0	3	0	0	1	X	8

=== Draw 7 ===
Tuesday, February 28

Sheet A	1	2	3	4	5	6	7	8	9	10	Final
Prince Edward Island (Currie) 🔨	0	0	0	0	0	1	0	0	X	X	1
Nova Scotia (Jones)	1	1	1	1	2	0	0	2	X	X	8

Sheet B	1	2	3	4	5	6	7	8	9	10	Final
Northwest Territories/Yukon (Moss) 🔨	1	0	1	0	1	0	1	0	0	X	4
Quebec (Charette)	0	2	0	2	0	1	0	1	1	X	7

Sheet C	1	2	3	4	5	6	7	8	9	10	Final
Manitoba (Laliberte) 🔨	1	0	0	1	0	0	3	0	1	1	7
Saskatchewan (McGeary)	0	0	2	0	2	1	0	1	0	0	6

Sheet D	1	2	3	4	5	6	7	8	9	10	Final
Ontario (Greenwood)	0	3	0	0	3	0	0	0	1	0	7
New Brunswick (Leahy) 🔨	1	0	0	1	0	1	3	1	0	3	10

Sheet E	1	2	3	4	5	6	7	8	9	10	Final
Alberta (Bennet)	0	0	0	1	0	0	3	1	0	X	5
Newfoundland (Barker) 🔨	0	0	1	0	1	1	0	0	1	X	4

=== Draw 8 ===
Wednesday, February 29

Sheet A	1	2	3	4	5	6	7	8	9	10	Final
Saskatchewan (McGeary) 🔨	0	1	2	1	0	1	0	1	0	X	6
Ontario (Greenwood)	0	0	0	0	1	0	1	0	3	X	5

Sheet B	1	2	3	4	5	6	7	8	9	10	Final
Newfoundland (Barker) 🔨	1	0	1	0	0	1	0	0	0	X	3
Manitoba (Laliberte)	0	1	0	2	0	0	2	1	2	X	8

Sheet C	1	2	3	4	5	6	7	8	9	10	Final
Nova Scotia (Jones) 🔨	2	2	0	1	1	0	2	0	1	X	9
New Brunswick (Leahy)	0	0	2	0	0	1	0	1	0	X	4

Sheet D	1	2	3	4	5	6	7	8	9	10	Final
British Columbia (Sparks) 🔨	0	0	1	0	1	1	1	0	1	X	5
Northwest Territories/Yukon (Moss)	1	0	0	0	0	0	0	1	0	X	2

Sheet E	1	2	3	4	5	6	7	8	9	10	Final
Quebec (Charette)	1	0	0	0	1	0	0	3	0	3	8
Prince Edward Island (Currie) 🔨	0	1	1	1	0	1	1	0	2	0	7

=== Draw 9 ===
Wednesday, February 29

Sheet A	1	2	3	4	5	6	7	8	9	10	Final
Manitoba (Laliberte)	0	3	1	0	0	2	0	1	1	X	8
Alberta (Bennet) 🔨	2	0	0	0	1	0	1	0	0	X	4

Sheet B	1	2	3	4	5	6	7	8	9	10	Final
New Brunswick (Leahy) 🔨	0	0	0	0	1	0	1	0	1	X	3
Quebec (Charette)	2	0	1	1	0	2	0	2	0	X	8

Sheet C	1	2	3	4	5	6	7	8	9	10	Final
Prince Edward Island (Currie)	0	1	0	0	0	0	0	X	X	X	1
British Columbia (Sparks) 🔨	4	0	1	1	1	2	2	X	X	X	11

Sheet D	1	2	3	4	5	6	7	8	9	10	Final
Ontario (Greenwood)	0	1	1	1	2	1	0	1	0	X	7
Newfoundland (Barker) 🔨	1	0	0	0	0	0	1	0	0	X	2

Sheet E	1	2	3	4	5	6	7	8	9	10	Final
Saskatchewan (McGeary)	0	1	1	1	2	1	0	0	2	X	8
Nova Scotia (Jones) 🔨	0	0	0	0	0	0	1	1	0	X	2

=== Draw 10 ===
Thursday, March 1

Sheet A	1	2	3	4	5	6	7	8	9	10	11	Final
Nova Scotia (Jones)	0	1	2	1	0	0	1	0	0	0	2	7
Newfoundland (Barker) 🔨	1	0	0	0	1	1	0	1	0	1	0	5

Sheet B	1	2	3	4	5	6	7	8	9	10	Final
Northwest Territories/Yukon (Moss) 🔨	0	2	0	0	1	0	1	0	1	X	5
Prince Edward Island (Currie)	1	0	2	1	0	1	0	2	0	X	7

Sheet C	1	2	3	4	5	6	7	8	9	10	Final
Alberta (Bennet) 🔨	0	1	0	0	2	0	2	0	1	0	6
Ontario (Greenwood)	1	0	1	0	0	2	0	3	0	0	7

Sheet D	1	2	3	4	5	6	7	8	9	10	Final
Quebec (Charette)	0	0	0	0	0	1	X	X	X	X	1
Saskatchewan (McGeary) 🔨	2	2	3	2	1	0	X	X	X	X	10

Sheet E	1	2	3	4	5	6	7	8	9	10	Final
British Columbia (Sparks) 🔨	2	0	0	2	1	2	2	X	X	X	9
New Brunswick (Leahy)	0	1	0	0	0	0	0	X	X	X	1

=== Draw 11 ===
Thursday, March 1

Sheet A	1	2	3	4	5	6	7	8	9	10	Final
New Brunswick (Leahy)	1	0	1	0	3	1	0	0	1	0	7
Northwest Territories/Yukon (Moss) 🔨	0	1	0	2	0	0	1	2	0	2	8

Sheet B	1	2	3	4	5	6	7	8	9	10	Final
British Columbia (Sparks)	0	0	1	0	1	0	1	3	4	X	10
Saskatchewan (McGeary) 🔨	0	1	0	1	0	1	0	0	0	X	3

Sheet C	1	2	3	4	5	6	7	8	9	10	Final
Newfoundland (Barker)	0	0	3	0	2	0	0	0	1	X	6
Quebec (Charette) 🔨	2	2	0	2	0	1	1	1	0	X	9

Sheet D	1	2	3	4	5	6	7	8	9	10	Final
Alberta (Bennet) 🔨	1	1	0	1	0	0	0	0	X	X	3
Nova Scotia (Jones)	0	0	2	0	3	0	3	1	X	X	9

Sheet E	1	2	3	4	5	6	7	8	9	10	Final
Ontario (Greenwood)	0	0	1	0	0	2	0	1	0	0	4
Manitoba (Laliberte) 🔨	0	2	0	2	1	0	1	0	1	1	8

== Tiebreaker ==
Friday, March 2

Sheet B	1	2	3	4	5	6	7	8	9	10	Final
British Columbia (Sparkes) 🔨	0	0	1	0	0	1	2	0	1	X	5
Saskatchewan (McGeary)	1	0	0	2	0	0	0	0	0	X	3

Player percentages
British Columbia		Saskatchewan	
Laurie Carney	84%	Allison Earl	68%
Debbie Orr	85%	Chris Gervais	74%
Linda Moore	75%	Gillian Thompson	84%
Lindsay Sparkes	74%	Lori McGeary	64%
Total	80%	Total	72%

== Playoffs ==
Semifinal			Final
			1	Nova Scotia	4
2	Manitoba	5	2	Manitoba	5
3	British Columbia	4

=== Semifinal ===
Friday, March 2

Sheet D	1	2	3	4	5	6	7	8	9	10	11	Final
Manitoba (Laliberte) 🔨	0	1	1	0	0	1	0	1	0	0	1	5
British Columbia (Sparkes)	0	0	0	2	0	0	0	0	1	1	0	4

Player percentages
Manitoba		British Columbia	
Janet Arnott	77%	Laurie Carney	83%
Corinne Peters	84%	Debbie Orr	88%
Chris More	72%	Linda Moore	76%
Connie Laliberte	75%	Lindsay Sparkes	63%
Total	77%	Total	78%

=== Final ===
Saturday, March 3

Sheet C	1	2	3	4	5	6	7	8	9	10	11	Final
Nova Scotia (Jones) 🔨	1	0	2	0	0	0	0	0	0	1	0	4
Manitoba (Laliberte)	0	1	0	0	0	0	3	0	0	0	1	5

Player percentages
Nova Scotia		Manitoba	
Barbara Jones-Gordon	77%	Janet Arnott	74%
Monica Jones	67%	Corinne Peters	83%
Wendy Currie	74%	Chris More	86%
Colleen Jones	61%	Connie Laliberte	75%
Total	70%	Total	80%

== Statistics ==
=== Top 5 player percentages ===
Final Round Robin Percentages

Key
All-Star Team

Leads	%
(British Columbia) Laurie Carney	83
(Nova Scotia) Barb Jones-Gordon	80
(Ontario) Fran Gareau	78
(Manitoba) Janet Arnott	76
(Alberta) Betty Clarke	75

Seconds	%
(Saskatchewan) Chris Gervais	77
(Manitoba) Corine Peters	77
(Nova Scotia) Monica Jones	74
(British Columbia) Debbie Orr	73
(Alberta) Judy Carr	73

Thirds	%
(Ontario) Yvonne Smith	78
(Saskatchewan) Gillian Thompson	75
(Nova Scotia) Wendy Currie	75
(British Columbia) Linda Moore	74
(Quebec) Guylaine Deschatelets	71

Skips	%
(Manitoba) Connie Laliberte	76
(British Columbia) Lindsay Sparkes	74
(Saskatchewan) Lori McGeary	73
(Quebec) Agnes Charette	73
(Nova Scotia) Colleen Jones	73

== Awards ==
The all-star team and sportsmanship award winners were as follows:

=== All-Star Team ===
Position	Name	Team
Skip	Connie Laliberte	Manitoba
Third	Gillian Thompson	Saskatchewan
Second	Chris Gervais	Saskatchewan
Lead	Laurie Carney	British Columbia

=== Elizabeth MacDonald Award ===
The Scotties Tournament of Hearts Sportsmanship Award is presented to the curler who best embodies the spirit of curling at the Scotties Tournament of Hearts. The winner was selected in a vote by all players at the tournament.

Prior to 1998, the award was named after a notable individual in the curling community where the tournament was held that year. For this edition, the award was named after Elizabeth MacDonald, who was an influential builder for women's curling in Prince Edward Island as she founded the first women's competition at the Charlottetown Curling Club in 1950 and responsible for the formation of the PEI Ladies Curling Association in 1959. She also competed in three Canadian women's curling championships in 1961, 1962, and 1967.

Name	Team	Position
Yvonne Smith	Ontario	Third
