= Janet Arnott =

Canadian curler and coach (1956–2019)

- Curler
- Born: Janet Elizabeth Laliberte; April 17, 1956; Winnipeg, Manitoba, Canada
- Died: June 24, 2019 (aged 63); Winnipeg, Manitoba Canada

Curling career
- Hearts: 11 (1984, 1992, 1993, 1994, 1995, 1996, 1999, 2000, 2006, 2007, 2011)
- World Championship: 3 (1984, 1992, 1995)
Medal record
Women's curling
Representing Canada
World Championships
| Gold medal – first place | 1984 Duluth |
| Silver medal – second place | 1995 Brandon |
| Bronze medal – third place | 1992 Garmisch-Partenkirchen |
Representing Manitoba
Scotties Tournament of Hearts
| Gold medal – first place | 1984 Charlottetown |
| Gold medal – first place | 1992 Halifax |
| Gold medal – first place | 1995 Calgary |
| Silver medal – second place | 1994 Kitchener |
| Silver medal – second place | 2006 London |
| Silver medal – second place | 2011 Charlottetown |
| Bronze medal – third place | 1996 Thunder Bay |
| Bronze medal – third place | 1999 Charlottetown |
| Bronze medal – third place | 2000 Prince George |
| Bronze medal – third place | 2007 Lethbridge |
Canadian Olympic Curling Trials
| Silver medal – second place | 1987 Calgary |

Janet Elizabeth Arnott (née Laliberte; April 17, 1956 – June 24, 2019) was a Canadian world champion curler and Olympic champion coach.

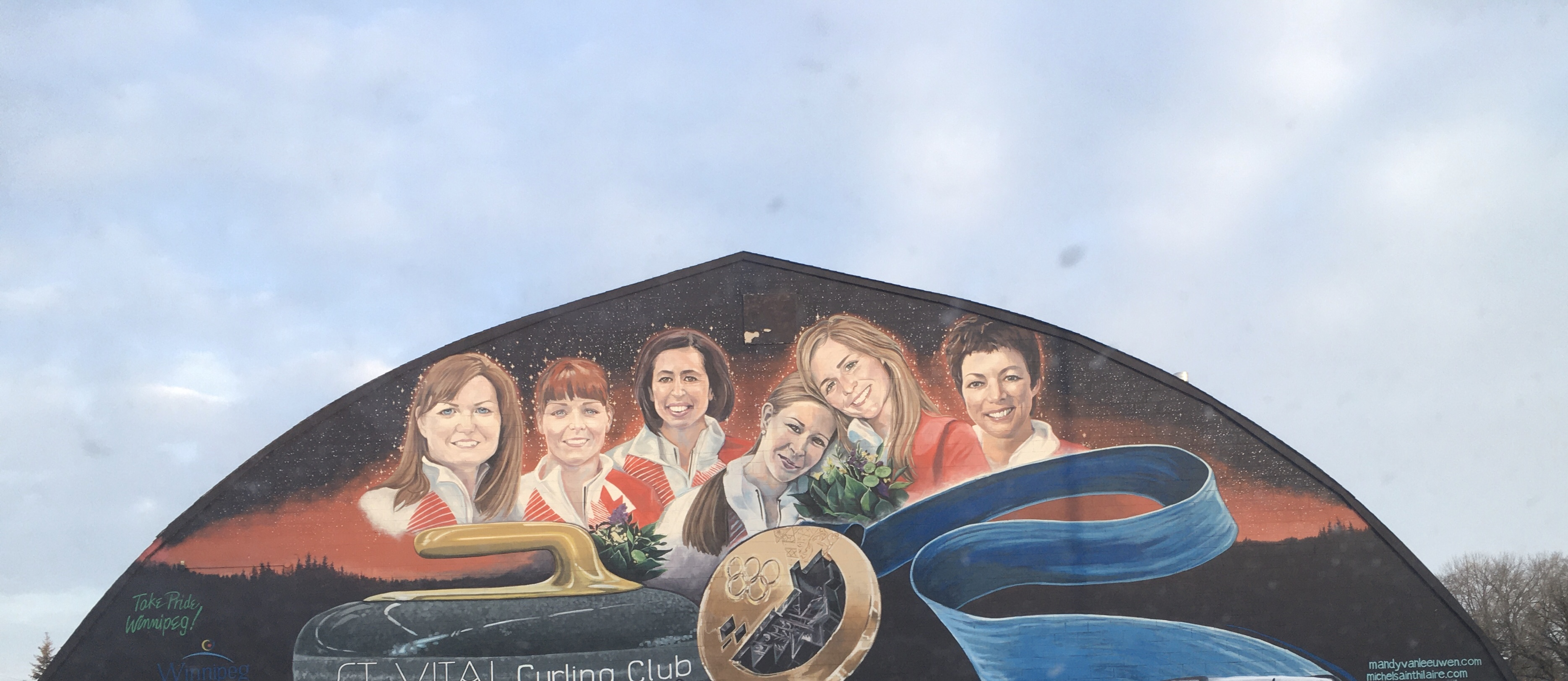
Mural of Arnott (far right) and her team at the St. Vital Curling Club

== Curling career ==
Arnott was the longtime lead for her sister, Connie Laliberte winning the Scott Tournament of Hearts in 1984, 1992 and 1995 and the World Curling Championships in 1984. With Laliberte, Arnott had played in eight national championships (1984, 1992, 1993, 1994, 1995, 1996, 1999, and 2000).

After Laliberte retired from curling in 2000, the team's then third, Cathy Overton-Clapham took over as skip. Laliberte returned to competitive curling in 2001, with Overton-Clapham forming her own team. Arnott joined her sister as her second for the next few seasons.

Arnott replaced Dana Allerton on the Jennifer Jones team midway through the 2006–07 season amidst some outcry from the curling community. After playing with them at the 2007 Scotties Tournament of Hearts, she was replaced by Dawn Askin as Jones' lead. In 2007, Arnott became the coach of the team before being replaced by Earle Morris in 2010. For the 2010–11 season, Arnott remained part of the team, serving as their alternate at the 2011 Scotties Tournament of Hearts. After Morris left Team Jones to coach the Rachel Homan team in 2011, Arnott returned to coaching the team. She was the team's coach when they won the gold medal at the 2014 Winter Olympics. She was replaced as the team's coach in 2014 by Wendy Morgan.

Arnott was inducted into the Canadian Curling Hall of Fame in 2000 and the Manitoba Curling Hall of Fame in 2002.

== Personal life ==
Janet Elizabeth Laliberte was born on April 17, 1956, in Winnipeg, Manitoba, to Jean and Gus Laliberte. She lived all of her life in the city's St. Vital neighbourhood. She graduated from Dakota Collegiate and completed certificates in Business Accountancy and Business Administration from Red River Community College.

She married Doug Arnott and adopted his surname. She worked at Shoppers Drug Mart until retiring in 2016. She died of cancer on June 24, 2019.
