= Cathy Gauthier =

- Curler
- Born: Cathy Tardi; June 5, 1961; Winnipeg, Manitoba, Canada

Curling career
- Hearts: 6 (1992, 1993, 1994, 1995, 1996, 2005)
- World Championship: 3 (1992, 1995, 2005)
Medal record
Women's curling
Representing Canada
World Championships
Silver medal – second place	1995 Brandon
Bronze medal – third place	1992 Garmisch-Partenkirchen
Representing Manitoba
Scotties Tournament of Hearts
Gold medal – first place	1992 Halifax
Gold medal – first place	1995 Calgary
Gold medal – first place	2005 St. John's
Silver medal – second place	1994 Kitchener
Bronze medal – third place	1996 Thunder Bay

Cathy Gauthier (née Tardi; June 5, 1961 in Winnipeg, Manitoba) is a Canadian curler and broadcaster.

Gauthier began curling in grade 9. She played juniors for one season with Connie Laliberte, losing in the Manitoba final one year.

Gauthier joined back up with Laliberte in women's play, and was on her team for much of her career. Gauthier won two championships with Laliberte, in 1992 and 1995, and won the 2005 Scott Tournament of Hearts with Jennifer Jones, playing lead. Although she is one of the few women to win three championships on the national level, she has not won a world championship. She left the Jones team in May 2005 due to family commitments.

Gauthier, who is regularly employed with the Canadian Government, also works as a curling broadcaster, having called games for TSN and Global TV in Winnipeg and Rogers Sportsnet nationally.

Gauthier is the mother of 2020 Canadian Junior Men's curling champion skip Jacques Gauthier and aunt of three-time Canadian junior champion Tyler Tardi.
