= 2005 Scott Tournament of Hearts =

Canadian women's curling championship

- Host city: St. John's, Newfoundland and Labrador
- Arena: Mile One Stadium
- Dates: February 19–27
- Attendance: 72,799
- Winner: Manitoba
- Curling club: St. Vital CC, Winnipeg
- Skip: Jennifer Jones
- Third: Cathy Overton-Clapham
- Second: Jill Officer
- Lead: Cathy Gauthier
- Alternate: Trish Eck
- Coach: Larry Jones
- Finalist: Ontario (Jenn Hanna)

The 2005 Scott Tournament of Hearts, the Canadian women's curling championship, was held at Mile One Stadium in St. John's, Newfoundland and Labrador from February 19 to 27, 2005. The tournament included 12 teams, one from each of Canada's provinces, one from Canada's territories and the defending champion Colleen Jones, whose team was known as Team Canada. Oddly, Jones' team is the only returning team from the 2004 Scott Tournament of Hearts as all other provincial champions lost in their playdowns. Colleen Jones, who had won the last four tournaments (for a total of 6) is joined by Cathy King who won the tournament in 1998. Also participating is 2002 Manitoba champion Jennifer Jones, 2001 Yukon/Northwest Territories champion Kerry Koe, 4-time Newfoundland champion Heather Strong, 2000 Nova Scotia champion (and former third of Colleen Jones) Kay Zinck, 3-time Prince Edward Island champion skip Rebecca Jean MacPhee, 1996 Quebec champion second Brenda Nicholls (playing skip this time), 1993 New Brunswick champion second Sandy Comeau (playing skip this time) as well as newcomers Kelly Scott of British Columbia, Jenn Hanna of Ontario and Stefanie Lawton of Saskatchewan.

After the round-robin play, 4 teams were tied for the last playoff spot, and defending champion of the last 4 years, Colleen Jones was eliminated in her first tie-breaker match against New Brunswick's Sandy Comeau who would later lose to Jenn Hanna of Ontario. As Colleen Jones was eliminated, it had become clear there was a new era in Canadian women's curling, and that was of youth. Three of the four playoff teams were former national junior champions (Lawton in 2001, Jennifer Jones in 1994 and Scott in 1995), and the other was a runner-up (Hanna in 1998). In the end, it was Jennifer Jones over Hanna, in a very close game that came down to the final shot.

== Television coverage ==
Controversy arose during the 2005 Scott Tournament of Hearts, as it was the first major tournament where the Canadian Broadcasting Corporation had full rights to televise the games. Previously, The Sports Network showed all the draws except the semi-final and the final, which was covered by the CBC. However, in a decision made in 2004, the Canadian Curling Association awarded the new contract to CBC, which had a higher bid than TSN. This would mean only the afternoon draws would be covered on the main network while evening draws were shown on the Digital Cable Channel, CBC Country Canada which only reached half a million Canadian homes. Morning draws, which TSN did not want to renew anyway were not shown at all. Many Canadian fans were outraged come Tournament time, as they were disappointed with what many considered inferior coverage on the CBC as well as the scheduling problems. Some games were moved to The Score and some games on CBC Country Canada were cut short because of Canadian Radio-television and Telecommunications Commission (CRTC) regulations that restricted the channel to only 12.4 hours of sports per week. This angered fans, and the CCA as well as many event sponsors were sent many angry letters and phone calls, some people even threatening to boycott the sponsors.

== Teams ==
The teams were listed as follows:

Team Canada	Alberta	British Columbia
Mayflower CC, Halifax Skip: Colleen Jones; Third: Kim Kelly; Second: Mary Anne Arsenault; Lead: Nancy Delahunt; Alternate: Mary Sue Radford	Saville Centre CC, Edmonton Skip: Cathy King; Third: Lori Armitstead; Second: Raylene Rocque; Lead: Tracy Bush; Alternate: Beth Iskiw	Kelowna CC Kelowna Skip: Kelly Scott; Third: Michelle Allen; Second: Sasha Carter; Lead: Renee Simons; Alternate: Cheryl Noble
Manitoba	New Brunswick	Newfoundland and Labrador
St. Vital CC, Winnipeg Skip: Jennifer Jones; Third: Cathy Overton-Clapham; Second: Jill Officer; Lead: Cathy Gauthier; Alternate: Trish Eck	Beaver CC, Moncton Skip: Sandy Comeau; Third: Stacey Leger; Second: Allison Farrell; Lead: Sandi Prosser; Alternate: Stacy Sampson	St. John's CC, St. John's Skip: Heather Strong; Third: Laura Strong; Second: Beth Hamilton (Note: Team Newfoundland & Labrador alternate Marcie Brown threw second stones in Draw 10.); Lead: Susan O'Leary; Alternate: Marcie Brown
Nova Scotia	Ontario	Prince Edward Island
Mayflower CC, Halifax Skip: Kay Zinck; Third: Mary Mattatall; Second: Candice Mittelstadt; Lead: Monica Moriarty (Note: Team Nova Scotia alternate Meaghan Smart threw lead stones in Draw 17.); Alternate: Meaghan Smart	Ottawa CC, Ottawa Skip: Jenn Hanna; Third: Pascale Letendre; Second: Dawn Askin; Lead: Steph Hanna; Alternate: Joelle Sabourin	Charlottetown CC, Charlottetown Fourth: Shelly Bradley; Skip: Rebecca Jean MacPhee; Second: Robyn MacPhee; Lead: Stefanie Richard; Alternate: Kim Dolan
Quebec	Saskatchewan	Northwest Territories/Yukon
CC Victoria, Sainte-Foy Skip: Brenda Nicholls; Third: Allison Ross; Second: Catherine Derick; Lead: Marie-Josée Fortier; Alternate: Julie Rainville	CN Curling Club, Saskatoon Skip: Stefanie Lawton; Third: Marliese Miller; Second: Sherri Singler; Lead: Chelsey Bell; Alternate: Sherry Anderson	Yellowknife CC, Yellowknife Fourth: Monique Gagnier; Skip: Kerry Koe; Second: Kelli Sharpe; Lead: Heather McCagg-Nystrom; Alternate: Shona Barbour

== Map of teams ==
Team Canada Provincial Winners

== Round robin standings ==
Final round robin standings

Key
Teams to Playoffs
Teams to Tiebreakers

Locale	Skip	W	L	W–L	PF	PA	EW	EL	BE	SE	S%
Manitoba	Jennifer Jones	9	2	–	82	55	49	38	10	18	80%
British Columbia	Kelly Scott	8	3	–	64	50	46	34	20	20	80%
Saskatchewan	Stefanie Lawton	7	4	–	69	56	42	46	17	7	83%
Ontario	Jenn Hanna	6	5	3–0	65	69	44	45	11	7	83%
Alberta	Cathy King	6	5	1–2; 1–1	68	62	45	45	13	12	79%
Canada	Colleen Jones	6	5	1–2; 1–1	77	68	49	44	11	15	82%
New Brunswick	Sandy Comeau	6	5	1–2; 1–1	69	77	46	52	7	12	77%
Nova Scotia	Kay Zinck	5	6	–	65	62	42	46	11	10	76%
Quebec	Brenda Nicholls	4	7	2–0	63	73	45	50	9	14	79%
Northwest Territories/Yukon	Kerry Koe	4	7	1–1	70	73	49	44	11	14	77%
Prince Edward Island	Rebecca Jean MacPhee	4	7	0–2	70	73	49	44	11	14	77%
Newfoundland and Labrador	Heather Strong	1	10	–	53	75	39	47	15	9	77%

== Round Robin results ==
All draw times are listed in Eastern Time (UTC−05:00).

=== Draw 1 ===
Saturday, February 19, 2:00 pm

Sheet A	1	2	3	4	5	6	7	8	9	10	Final
Manitoba (J. Jones) 🔨	0	2	1	1	1	0	0	0	0	2	7
Newfoundland and Labrador (Strong)	0	0	0	0	0	1	2	0	2	0	5

Sheet B	1	2	3	4	5	6	7	8	9	10	Final
Alberta (King)	0	0	0	1	0	1	0	1	0	0	3
Saskatchewan (Lawton) 🔨	0	1	0	0	0	0	2	0	0	3	6

Sheet C	1	2	3	4	5	6	7	8	9	10	Final
Quebec (Nicholls)	0	0	1	0	0	2	0	0	1	X	4
British Columbia (Scott) 🔨	0	1	0	0	1	0	3	2	0	X	7

Sheet D	1	2	3	4	5	6	7	8	9	10	Final
Ontario (Hanna) 🔨	1	0	0	0	1	0	3	0	2	X	7
Canada (C. Jones)	0	0	1	0	0	1	0	2	0	X	4

=== Draw 2 ===
Saturday, February 19, 7:30 pm

Sheet A	1	2	3	4	5	6	7	8	9	10	Final
British Columbia (Scott) 🔨	0	0	0	2	0	0	2	1	1	X	6
Alberta (King)	1	0	0	0	2	0	0	0	0	X	3

Sheet B	1	2	3	4	5	6	7	8	9	10	Final
Nova Scotia (Zinck) 🔨	0	4	0	1	0	2	4	X	X	X	11
Northwest Territories/Yukon (Koe)	0	0	1	0	2	0	0	X	X	X	3

Sheet C	1	2	3	4	5	6	7	8	9	10	Final
Prince Edward Island (MacPhee) 🔨	1	0	2	1	1	1	0	1	0	0	7
New Brunswick (Comeau)	0	1	0	0	0	0	2	0	2	3	8

Sheet D	1	2	3	4	5	6	7	8	9	10	Final
Quebec (Nicholls) 🔨	0	1	0	0	0	0	1	0	2	0	4
Saskatchewan (Lawton)	0	0	0	0	2	1	0	1	0	1	5

=== Draw 3 ===
Sunday, February 20, 9:30 am

Sheet B	1	2	3	4	5	6	7	8	9	10	Final
Canada (C. Jones) 🔨	0	1	0	0	1	1	0	1	1	X	5
Manitoba (J. Jones)	1	0	3	1	0	0	3	0	0	X	8

Sheet C	1	2	3	4	5	6	7	8	9	10	Final
Ontario (Hanna) 🔨	0	0	1	0	1	0	0	0	X	X	2
Newfoundland and Labrador (Strong)	0	0	0	1	0	2	1	4	X	X	8

=== Draw 4 ===
Sunday, February 20, 2:00 pm

Sheet A	1	2	3	4	5	6	7	8	9	10	Final
Northwest Territories/Yukon (Koe) 🔨	1	0	0	0	1	0	0	4	0	2	8
Prince Edward Island (MacPhee)	0	0	1	0	0	2	1	0	3	0	7

Sheet B	1	2	3	4	5	6	7	8	9	10	Final
Saskatchewan (Lawton) 🔨	0	0	2	3	0	3	0	0	0	X	8
British Columbia (Scott)	0	0	0	0	2	0	1	1	1	X	5

Sheet C	1	2	3	4	5	6	7	8	9	10	Final
Alberta (King) 🔨	0	1	1	0	0	1	0	1	0	2	6
Quebec (Nicholls)	1	0	0	0	2	0	1	0	1	0	5

Sheet D	1	2	3	4	5	6	7	8	9	10	Final
Nova Scotia (Zinck) 🔨	2	0	0	0	3	0	0	2	0	0	7
New Brunswick (Comeau)	0	1	0	1	0	2	1	0	3	4	12

=== Draw 5 ===
Sunday, February 20, 7:30 pm

Sheet A	1	2	3	4	5	6	7	8	9	10	Final
Newfoundland and Labrador (Strong) 🔨	0	0	0	0	0	2	0	1	X	X	3
Canada (C. Jones)	0	0	1	4	0	0	2	0	X	X	7

Sheet B	1	2	3	4	5	6	7	8	9	10	Final
Prince Edward Island (MacPhee) 🔨	2	0	1	0	0	0	0	1	0	X	4
Nova Scotia (Zinck)	0	2	0	0	2	1	3	0	1	X	9

Sheet C	1	2	3	4	5	6	7	8	9	10	Final
New Brunswick (Comeau) 🔨	3	0	1	0	0	2	0	1	0	0	7
Northwest Territories/Yukon (Koe)	0	1	0	1	0	0	1	0	3	2	8

Sheet D	1	2	3	4	5	6	7	8	9	10	Final
Manitoba (J. Jones) 🔨	2	0	2	1	2	0	2	X	X	X	9
Ontario (Hanna)	0	1	0	0	0	1	0	X	X	X	2

=== Draw 6 ===
Monday, February 21, 9:30 am

Sheet A	1	2	3	4	5	6	7	8	9	10	Final
Ontario (Hanna) 🔨	1	0	1	0	1	1	0	0	2	1	7
Quebec (Nicholls)	0	1	0	2	0	0	2	1	0	0	6

Sheet B	1	2	3	4	5	6	7	8	9	10	Final
Canada (C. Jones) 🔨	1	0	2	0	1	1	0	3	0	1	9
Alberta (King)	0	1	0	2	0	0	4	0	1	0	8

Sheet C	1	2	3	4	5	6	7	8	9	10	Final
Manitoba (J. Jones) 🔨	1	0	0	1	0	0	2	0	0	X	4
British Columbia (Scott)	0	0	1	0	1	2	0	0	3	X	7

Sheet D	1	2	3	4	5	6	7	8	9	10	11	Final
Newfoundland and Labrador (Strong) 🔨	2	0	1	0	1	0	1	1	0	1	0	7
Saskatchewan (Lawton)	0	1	0	2	0	2	0	0	2	0	3	10

=== Draw 7 ===
Monday, February 21, 2:00 pm

Sheet A	1	2	3	4	5	6	7	8	9	10	Final
Alberta (King) 🔨	1	1	1	1	1	0	1	0	3	X	9
New Brunswick (Comeau)	0	0	0	0	0	3	0	1	0	X	4

Sheet B	1	2	3	4	5	6	7	8	9	10	Final
Quebec (Nicholls) 🔨	1	1	0	3	0	0	1	0	1	X	7
Northwest Territories/Yukon (Koe)	0	0	1	0	1	1	0	1	0	X	4

Sheet C	1	2	3	4	5	6	7	8	9	10	Final
Saskatchewan (Lawton) 🔨	0	2	0	3	0	2	0	1	0	X	8
Prince Edward Island (MacPhee)	0	0	1	0	1	0	1	0	1	X	4

Sheet D	1	2	3	4	5	6	7	8	9	10	Final
British Columbia (Scott) 🔨	1	0	1	1	2	1	1	0	X	X	7
Nova Scotia (Zinck)	0	1	0	0	0	0	0	1	X	X	2

=== Draw 8 ===
Monday, February 21, 2:00 pm

Sheet A	1	2	3	4	5	6	7	8	9	10	Final
Nova Scotia (Zinck) 🔨	0	0	2	0	3	0	0	1	0	X	6
Manitoba (J. Jones)	0	1	0	3	0	2	1	0	2	X	9

Sheet B	1	2	3	4	5	6	7	8	9	10	Final
Prince Edward Island (MacPhee) 🔨	2	0	2	0	0	2	0	2	0	X	8
Newfoundland and Labrador (Strong)	0	1	0	1	0	0	2	0	2	X	6

Sheet C	1	2	3	4	5	6	7	8	9	10	Final
Northwest Territories/Yukon (Koe) 🔨	1	0	0	3	0	5	0	0	1	X	10
Ontario (Hanna)	0	2	1	0	1	0	1	1	0	X	6

Sheet D	1	2	3	4	5	6	7	8	9	10	Final
New Brunswick (Comeau) 🔨	1	0	1	0	1	0	2	0	2	1	8
Canada (C. Jones)	0	3	0	1	0	2	0	1	0	0	7

=== Draw 9 ===
Tuesday, February 22, 9:30 am

Sheet A	1	2	3	4	5	6	7	8	9	10	Final
Northwest Territories/Yukon (Koe) 🔨	1	3	0	2	0	1	0	2	X	X	9
Newfoundland and Labrador (Strong)	0	0	1	0	1	0	1	0	X	X	3

Sheet B	1	2	3	4	5	6	7	8	9	10	Final
New Brunswick (Comeau) 🔨	0	1	0	0	1	1	0	0	0	X	3
Manitoba (J. Jones)	1	0	2	0	0	0	4	1	1	X	9

Sheet C	1	2	3	4	5	6	7	8	9	10	Final
Nova Scotia (Zinck) 🔨	2	0	1	0	1	0	0	0	0	X	4
Canada (C. Jones)	0	1	0	1	0	2	1	2	1	X	8

Sheet D	1	2	3	4	5	6	7	8	9	10	Final
Prince Edward Island (MacPhee) 🔨	0	2	0	1	0	2	1	1	0	1	8
Ontario (Hanna)	0	0	1	0	1	0	0	0	2	0	4

=== Draw 10 ===
Tuesday, February 22, 2:00 pm

Sheet A	1	2	3	4	5	6	7	8	9	10	Final
Canada (C. Jones) 🔨	0	1	0	1	1	0	2	0	1	1	7
Saskatchewan (Lawton)	0	0	1	0	0	1	0	1	0	0	3

Sheet B	1	2	3	4	5	6	7	8	9	10	Final
Ontario (Hanna) 🔨	0	1	0	0	3	1	2	0	1	X	8
British Columbia (Scott)	0	0	0	2	0	0	0	1	0	X	3

Sheet C	1	2	3	4	5	6	7	8	9	10	Final
Newfoundland and Labrador (Strong) 🔨	0	0	0	1	0	1	0	1	X	X	3
Alberta (King)	0	1	2	0	2	0	2	0	X	X	7

Sheet D	1	2	3	4	5	6	7	8	9	10	Final
Manitoba (J. Jones) 🔨	0	0	1	2	1	0	2	4	X	X	10
Quebec (Nicholls)	0	1	0	0	0	2	0	0	X	X	3

=== Draw 11 ===
Tuesday, February 22, 7:30 pm

Sheet A	1	2	3	4	5	6	7	8	9	10	11	Final
British Columbia (Scott) 🔨	0	0	0	2	1	1	0	0	0	1	1	6
Prince Edward Island (MacPhee)	0	1	2	0	0	0	0	1	1	0	0	5

Sheet B	1	2	3	4	5	6	7	8	9	10	Final
Saskatchewan (Lawton) 🔨	0	2	0	0	1	0	4	0	1	X	8
Nova Scotia (Zinck)	0	0	1	0	0	1	0	1	0	X	3

Sheet C	1	2	3	4	5	6	7	8	9	10	Final
Quebec (Nicholls) 🔨	1	0	1	0	1	0	1	1	0	0	5
New Brunswick (Comeau)	0	2	0	1	0	2	0	0	1	2	8

Sheet D	1	2	3	4	5	6	7	8	9	10	Final
Alberta (King) 🔨	0	0	1	3	1	0	0	2	1	X	8
Northwest Territories/Yukon (Koe)	1	1	0	0	0	1	1	0	0	X	4

=== Draw 12 ===
Wednesday, February 23, 9:30 AM ET

Sheet A	1	2	3	4	5	6	7	8	9	10	Final
Quebec (Nicholls) 🔨	1	1	0	0	0	0	2	0	0	X	4
Nova Scotia (Zinck)	0	0	1	3	1	1	0	1	1	X	8

Sheet B	1	2	3	4	5	6	7	8	9	10	Final
Alberta (King) 🔨	2	0	2	0	0	1	0	2	0	0	7
Prince Edward Island (MacPhee)	0	2	0	0	1	0	1	0	1	1	6

Sheet C	1	2	3	4	5	6	7	8	9	10	Final
British Columbia (Scott) 🔨	1	0	0	2	0	1	0	1	3	X	8
Northwest Territories/Yukon (Koe)	0	1	1	0	1	0	0	0	0	X	3

Sheet D	1	2	3	4	5	6	7	8	9	10	Final
Saskatchewan (Lawton) 🔨	0	1	2	0	0	1	0	0	1	X	5
New Brunswick (Comeau)	2	0	0	1	1	0	1	1	0	X	6

=== Draw 13 ===
Wednesday, February 23, 2:00 pm

Sheet A	1	2	3	4	5	6	7	8	9	10	Final
New Brunswick (Comeau) 🔨	0	0	1	0	1	0	0	1	0	X	3
Ontario (Hanna)	0	0	0	2	0	0	3	0	3	X	8

Sheet B	1	2	3	4	5	6	7	8	9	10	Final
Northwest Territories/Yukon (Koe) 🔨	2	0	0	1	0	2	0	1	0	0	6
Canada (C. Jones)	0	0	0	0	2	0	3	0	3	2	10

Sheet C	1	2	3	4	5	6	7	8	9	10	Final
Prince Edward Island (MacPhee) 🔨	3	0	1	0	1	1	2	X	X	X	8
Manitoba (J. Jones)	0	1	0	1	0	0	0	X	X	X	2

Sheet D	1	2	3	4	5	6	7	8	9	10	Final
Nova Scotia (Zinck) 🔨	0	2	1	0	0	1	0	1	0	1	6
Newfoundland and Labrador (Strong)	0	0	0	2	1	0	0	0	1	0	4

=== Draw 14 ===
Wednesday, February 23, 7:30 ET

Sheet A	1	2	3	4	5	6	7	8	9	10	Final
Manitoba (J. Jones) 🔨	1	0	1	1	0	2	0	0	2	1	8
Alberta (King)	0	2	0	0	1	0	2	0	0	0	5

Sheet B	1	2	3	4	5	6	7	8	9	10	Final
Newfoundland and Labrador (Strong) 🔨	0	0	1	0	0	1	1	0	2	1	6
Quebec (Nicholls)	0	1	0	3	1	0	0	2	0	0	7

Sheet C	1	2	3	4	5	6	7	8	9	10	Final
Ontario (Hanna) 🔨	2	0	1	0	1	2	0	0	0	1	7
Saskatchewan (Lawton)	0	1	0	1	0	0	2	1	1	0	6

Sheet D	1	2	3	4	5	6	7	8	9	10	Final
Canada (C. Jones) 🔨	1	0	0	1	2	1	0	2	0	X	7
British Columbia (Scott)	0	0	0	0	0	0	1	0	3	X	4

=== Draw 15 ===
Thursday, February 24, 9:30 am

Sheet A	1	2	3	4	5	6	7	8	9	10	Final
Saskatchewan (Lawton) 🔨	0	1	0	0	2	2	0	1	0	X	6
Northwest Territories/Yukon (Koe)	0	0	0	1	0	0	1	0	1	X	3

Sheet B	1	2	3	4	5	6	7	8	9	10	Final
British Columbia (Scott) 🔨	1	0	0	1	1	1	1	0	1	X	6
New Brunswick (Comeau)	0	2	0	0	0	0	0	1	0	X	3

Sheet C	1	2	3	4	5	6	7	8	9	10	Final
Alberta (King) 🔨	0	1	0	0	2	0	1	0	3	X	7
Nova Scotia (Zinck)	0	0	0	1	0	1	0	1	0	X	3

Sheet D	1	2	3	4	5	6	7	8	9	10	Final
Quebec (Nicholls) 🔨	0	0	1	0	2	1	1	0	4	X	9
Prince Edward Island (MacPhee)	1	0	0	2	0	0	0	2	0	X	5

=== Draw 16 ===
Thursday, February 24, 2:00 pm

Sheet A	1	2	3	4	5	6	7	8	9	10	Final
Newfoundland and Labrador (Strong) 🔨	0	2	0	0	0	0	0	0	1	0	3
British Columbia (Scott)	0	0	0	2	0	0	1	1	0	1	5

Sheet B	1	2	3	4	5	6	7	8	9	10	Final
Manitoba (J. Jones) 🔨	2	0	0	1	0	0	2	0	2	X	7
Saskatchewan (Lawton)	0	1	0	0	0	1	0	2	0	X	4

Sheet C	1	2	3	4	5	6	7	8	9	10	Final
Canada (C. Jones) 🔨	0	0	3	0	3	0	0	1	0	0	7
Quebec (Nicholls)	1	1	0	1	0	2	2	0	1	1	9

Sheet D	1	2	3	4	5	6	7	8	9	10	Final
Ontario (Hanna) 🔨	2	0	2	0	1	0	2	0	1	X	8
Alberta (King)	0	1	0	2	0	1	0	1	0	X	5

=== Draw 17 ===
Thursday, February 24, 7:30 pm

Sheet A	1	2	3	4	5	6	7	8	9	10	Final
Prince Edward Island (MacPhee) 🔨	0	3	2	0	0	1	0	1	0	1	8
Canada (C. Jones)	0	0	0	1	1	0	1	0	3	0	6

Sheet B	1	2	3	4	5	6	7	8	9	10	Final
Nova Scotia (Zinck) 🔨	1	0	1	1	0	2	0	2	0	0	7
Ontario (Hanna)	0	1	0	0	1	0	2	0	2	0	6

Sheet C	1	2	3	4	5	6	7	8	9	10	Final
New Brunswick (Comeau) 🔨	1	0	1	0	0	1	1	0	2	1	7
Newfoundland and Labrador (Strong)	0	1	0	1	1	0	0	3	0	0	6

Sheet D	1	2	3	4	5	6	7	8	9	10	Final
Northwest Territories/Yukon (Koe) 🔨	2	0	0	2	1	0	1	0	1	0	7
Manitoba (J. Jones)	0	2	1	0	0	2	0	3	0	1	9

== Tiebreakers ==
First Round
Ontario	5
Alberta	3
Canada	4
New Brunswick	9

Second Round
Ontario	8
New Brunswick	5

=== First Round ===
Friday, February 25, 8:00 am

Sheet A	1	2	3	4	5	6	7	8	9	10	Final
Ontario (Hanna) 🔨	0	0	1	0	2	0	1	0	0	1	5
Alberta (King)	0	0	0	1	0	2	0	0	0	0	3

Player percentages
Ontario		Alberta	
Steph Hanna	89%	Tracy Bush	94%
Dawn Askin	85%	Raylene Rocque	76%
Pascale Letendre	85%	Lori Armitstead	88%
Jenn Hanna	86%	Cathy King	95%
Total	86%	Total	88%

Sheet D	1	2	3	4	5	6	7	8	9	10	Final
New Brunswick (Comeau) 🔨	2	0	0	1	0	1	1	0	4	X	9
Canada (C. Jones)	0	1	1	0	1	0	0	1	0	X	4

Player percentages
New Brunswick		Canada	
Sandi Prosser	64%	Nancy Delahunt	99%
Allison Farrell	81%	Mary-Anne Arsenault	79%
Stacey Leger	82%	Kim Kelly	83%
Sandy Comeau	82%	Colleen Jones	72%
Total	77%	Total	83%

=== Second Round ===
Friday, February 25, 12:30 pm

Sheet C	1	2	3	4	5	6	7	8	9	10	Final
Ontario (Hanna) 🔨	0	1	1	0	1	0	3	2	0	X	8
New Brunswick (Comeau)	0	0	0	1	0	2	0	0	2	X	5

Player percentages
Ontario		New Brunswick	
Steph Hanna	94%	Sandi Prosser	95%
Dawn Askin	86%	Allison Farrell	90%
Pascale Letendre	80%	Stacey Leger	70%
Jenn Hanna	82%	Sandy Comeau	72%
Total	86%	Total	82%

== Playoffs ==
Page playoff system
1	Manitoba	8
2	British Columbia	7
3	Saskatchewan	4
4	Ontario	10

Semifinal
2	British Columbia	7
4	Ontario	9

Final
1	Manitoba	8
4	Ontario	6

=== 1 vs. 2 ===
Friday February 25, 6:00 pm

Sheet C	1	2	3	4	5	6	7	8	9	10	Final
Manitoba (J. Jones) 🔨	2	0	0	2	0	3	0	0	1	0	8
British Columbia (Scott)	0	2	1	0	1	0	1	1	0	1	7

Player percentages
Manitoba		British Columbia	
Cathy Gauthier	78%	Renee Simons	93%
Jill Officer	79%	Sasha Carter	89%
Cathy Overton-Clapham	80%	Michelle Allen	93%
Jennifer Jones	69%	Kelly Scott	83%
Total	76%	Total	89%

=== 3 vs. 4 ===
Friday, February 25, 6:00 pm

Sheet B	1	2	3	4	5	6	7	8	9	10	Final
Saskatchewan (Lawton) 🔨	1	0	0	1	0	1	1	0	X	X	4
Ontario (Hanna)	0	1	4	0	2	0	0	3	X	X	10

Player percentages
Saskatchewan		Ontario	
Chelsey Bell	88%	Steph Hanna	89%
Sherri Singler	84%	Dawn Askin	83%
Marliese Miller	88%	Pascale Letendre	89%
Stefanie Lawton	69%	Jenn Hanna	78%
Total	82%	Total	85%

=== Semifinal ===
Saturday, February 26, 2:00 pm

Sheet C	1	2	3	4	5	6	7	8	9	10	Final
British Columbia (Scott) 🔨	1	0	3	0	1	0	1	0	1	0	7
Ontario (Hanna)	0	2	0	1	0	2	0	2	0	2	9

Player percentages
British Columbia		Ontario	
Renee Simons	94%	Steph Hanna	94%
Sasha Carter	84%	Dawn Askin	84%
Michelle Allen	79%	Pascale Letendre	93%
Kelly Scott	73%	Jenn Hanna	86%
Total	82%	Total	89%

=== Final ===
Sunday, February 27, 12:30 pm

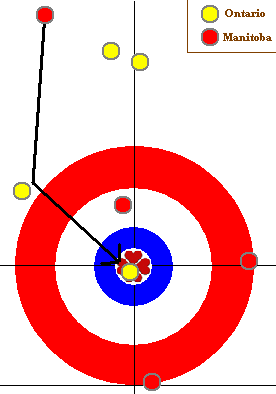
Jones had to make a difficult in-off to score four and win the 2005 Scott Tournament of Hearts.

Sheet C	1	2	3	4	5	6	7	8	9	10	Final
Manitoba (J. Jones) 🔨	0	0	2	0	0	0	1	1	0	4	8
Ontario (Hanna)	0	2	0	1	1	1	0	0	1	0	6

Player percentages
Manitoba		Ontario	
Cathy Gauthier	86%	Steph Hanna	78%
Jill Officer	75%	Dawn Askin	88%
Cathy Overton-Clapham	76%	Pascale Letendre	75%
Jennifer Jones	70%	Jenn Hanna	80%
Total	77%	Total	80%

==== The Shot ====
The final game between Jenn Hanna of Ontario and Jennifer Jones of Manitoba came down to the very last shot. Ontario had control of the game, and looked like they were going to pull if off at the end. However, in the last end they did not have the hammer, meaning Jones would have last rock. Ontario had a rock on the button that was well guarded, and the only way at it was an in-off a rock sitting just outside the house. Jones made this very difficult shot, which gave her four points and the win. This would later become known as "The Shot".

== Statistics ==
=== Top 5 Player Percentages ===
Round robin only; minimum 6 games

Key
First All-Star Team
Second All-Star Team

Leads	%
(Canada) Nancy Delahunt	91
(Newfoundland and Labrador) Susan O'Leary	91
(Saskatchewan) Chelsey Bell	88
(Ontario) Steph Hanna	87
(Nova Scotia) Monica Moriarty	84
(Alberta) Tracy Bush	84
(Quebec) Marie-Josée Fortier	84

Seconds	%
(Ontario) Dawn Askin	84
(Saskatchewan) Sherri Singler	83
(Canada) Mary-Anne Arsenault	83
(British Columbia) Sasha Carter	80
(Prince Edward Island) Robyn MacPhee	80

Thirds	%
(Saskatchewan) Marliese Miller	82
(Ontario) Pascale Letendre	82
(Quebec) Allison Ross	82
(Alberta) Lori Armitstead	81
(British Columbia) Michelle Allen	79

Skips	%
(Manitoba) Jennifer Jones	80
(Saskatchewan) Stefanie Lawton	80
(Ontario) Jenn Hanna	80
(British Columbia) Kelly Scott	79
(Alberta) Cathy King	78

=== Perfect games ===
Round robin only; minimum 10 shots thrown

Player	Team	Position	Shots	Opponent
Susan O'Leary	Newfoundland and Labrador	Lead	20	British Columbia

== Awards ==
=== All-Star teams ===
First Team
Position	Name	Team
Skip	Jennifer Jones	Manitoba
Third	Marliese Miller	Saskatchewan
Second	Dawn Askin	Ontario
Lead	Nancy Delahunt	Canada

Second Team
Position	Name	Team
Skip	Jenn Hanna	Ontario
Third	Pascale Letendre	Ontario
Second	Sherri Singler	Saskatchewan
Lead	Susan O'Leary	Newfoundland and Labrador

=== Marj Mitchell Sportsmanship Award ===
The Marj Mitchell Sportsmanship Award was presented to the player chosen by their fellow peers as the curler that most exemplified sportsmanship and dedication to curling during the annual Scotties Tournament of Hearts.

Name	Position	Team
Stefanie Richard	Lead	Prince Edward Island

=== Sandra Schmirler Most Valuable Player Award ===
The Sandra Schmirler Most Valuable Player Award was awarded to the top player in the playoff round by members of the media in the Scotties Tournament of Hearts.

Name	Position	Team
Jenn Hanna	Skip	Ontario

=== Joan Mead Builder Award ===
The Joan Mead Builder Award recognizes a builder in the sport of curling named in the honour of the late CBC curling producer Joan Mead.

Name	Contribution(s)
Shirley Morash	Past Canadian Curling Association president

=== Ford Hot Shots ===
The Ford Hot Shots was a skills competition preceding the round robin of the tournament. Each competitor had to perform a series of shots with each shot scoring between 0 and 5 points depending on where the stone came to rest. The winner of this edition of the event would win a two-year lease on a Ford Freestyle SEL.

Winner	Runner-Up	Score
(Ontario) Jenn Hanna	(Nova Scotia) Kay Zinck	18–15

=== Shot of the Week Award ===
The Shot of the Week Award was awarded to the curler who had been determined with the most outstanding shot during the tournament as voted on by TSN commentators.

Name	Position	Team
Jennifer Jones	Skip	Manitoba

== Provincial playdowns ==
Defending provincial champions are indicated in bold.

=== Alberta ===
@ the Lethbridge Curling Club in Lethbridge. Cathy King defeated Shannon Kleibrink in the finals 5–4 on January 30.
Results:

- Cathy King, Saville Centre CC, Edmonton (5–2) won semi-final, won final
- **Shannon Kleibrink**, Calgary Winter Club (6–1) lost final
- Renelle Bryden, Calgary CC (5–2) lost semi-final
- Deb Santos, Saville Centre CC, Edmonton (4–3)
- Renée Sonnenberg, Grande Prairie CC (4–3)
- Diane Foster, Garrison CC and Calgary CC (2–5)
- Cindy Serna, Saville Centre CC, Edmonton (2–5)
- Jodi Busche, Fort St. John and Grande Prairie CC (0–7)

=== British Columbia ===
@ the Marpole Curling Club in Vancouver. Kelly Scott's team wins final on January 22 over Patti Knezevic 7–6.

- Kelly Scott, Kelowna CC (6–1) won final
- Patti Knezevic, Prince George Golf & CC (5–2) won semi, lost final
- Pat Sanders, Duncan CC (4–3) - won tie-breaker, lost semi
- Jerri-Pat Armstrong, Cranbrook CC (4–3) - lost tie-breaker
- Toni Wills, Gordon Ears Winter Club, Maple Ridge (3–4)
- Janelle Yardley, Kamloops CC (3–4)
- **Georgina Wheatcroft**, Valley CC, Cloverdale (2–5)
- Kristy Lewis, Richmond CC (1–6)

=== Manitoba ===
@ the Souris Glenwood Arena in Souris. Jennifer Jones defeated Kristy Jenion 5–4 in the finals on January 30.
Results:
Red Group

- **Lois Fowler**, Wheat City CC, Brandon (6–1) lost "red1-black1" game, lost semi-final
- Liza Park, Brandon CC (5–2) lost "red2-black2" game
- Joelle Duguid, Fort Rouge CC, Winnipeg (4–3)
- Karen Young, Springfield CC, Dugald (4–3)
- Janet Harvey, Fort Rouge CC, Winnipeg (4–3)
- Chris Scalena, Starbuck CC (3–4)
- Gwen Wooley, Morden CC (2–5)
- Lois Mosiondz, The Pas CC (1–6)

Black Group

- Jennifer Jones, St. Vital CC, Winnipeg (6–1) won tie-breaker, won "red2-black2" game, won semi-final, won final
- Kristy Jenion, St. Vital CC, Winnipeg (6–1) won "red1-black1" game, lost final
- Kristen Williamson, Brandon CC (6–1) lost tie-breaker
- Barb Spencer, Fort Rouge CC, Winnipeg (3–4)
- Terry Ursel, Plumas CC (3–4)
- Ainsley Champagne, Fort Rouge CC, Winnipeg (2–5)
- Linda Stewart, Swan River CC (2–5)
- Jackie McCormick, Arborg CC (0–7)

=== New Brunswick ===
@ the Thistle St. Andrew's Curling Club in Saint John. Sandy Comeau's team wins the final on January 23 over Heidi Hanlon 6–3

- Sandy Comeau, Beaver CC, Moncton (5–2) - wins tie-breaker, wins semi, wins final
- **Heidi Hanlon**, Thistle St. Andrew's CC, Saint John (6–1) - loses final
- Melissa Adams, Grand Falls CC/Curling Beauséjour Inc., Moncton (5–2) - lost semi
- Sylvie Robichaud, Curling Beauséjour Inc., Moncton (5–2) - lost tie-breaker
- Susan Dobson, Thistle St. Andrew's CC, Saint John (4–3)
- Kathy Floyd, Thistle St. Andrew's CC, Saint John (2–5)
- Karen McDermott, Beaver CC, Moncton (1–6)
- Maureen McMaster, Beaver CC, Moncton (0–7)

=== Newfoundland and Labrador ===
@ the Carol Curling Club in Labrador City. Heather Strong's team wins final on January 23 over Laura Phillips 6–5

- Heather Strong, St. John's CC (4–0) won final
- Laura Phillips, St. John's CC (3–1) won semi, lost final
- **Cathy Cunningham**, St. John's CC (2–2) lost semi
- Debbie Porter, Carol CC, Labrador City (1–3)
- Marcie Brown, St. John's CC (0–4)

=== Nova Scotia ===
@ the Yarmouth Curling Club in Yarmouth. Kay Zinck defeated Virginia Jackson 7–3 in the finals on January 30.
Teams:

- Kay Zinck, Mayflower CC, Halifax (7–0) won final
- Virginia Jackson, Truro CC (5–2) won semi-final, lost final
- **Heather Smith-Dacey**, Mayflower CC, Halifax (5–2) lost semi-final
- Jillian Mouzar, Mayflower CC, Halifax (4–3)
- Lisa DePaoli, Glooscap CC, Kentville (3–4)
- Sue-Ann Bartlett, Mayflower CC, Halifax (2–5)
- Teri Lake, Mayflower CC, Halifax (1–6)
- Denise Pelrine, Mayflower CC, Halifax (1–6)

=== Ontario ===
@ the Rideau Curling Club in Ottawa. After going down 1–4 early on in round-robin play, Jenn Hanna's team from the Ottawa Curling Club wins eight straight to win the championships over Krista Scharf 6–4 on January 30.
Results:

- Jenn Hanna, Ottawa CC, Ottawa 5–4; won second tie-breaker, won "3–4" game, won semi-final, won final
- Krista Scharf, Fort William CC, Thunder Bay 6–3; won "1–2" game, lost final
- Chrissy Cadorin, Guelph CC 7–2; lost "1–2" game, lost semi-final
- Jo-Ann Rizzo, Brant CC, Brantford 6–3; lost "3–4" game
- Janet McGhee, Uxbridge & District CC 5–4; won first tie-breaker, lost second
- Kathy Brown, Sutton CC 5–4; lost first tie-breaker
- Tara George, Fort William CC, Thunder Bay 4–5
- Kim Moore, North Halton Golf & Country Club, Georgetown 3–6
- Elaine Uhryn, Soo Curlers' Association, Sault Ste. Marie 3–6
- Dawn Schwar, Sudbury CC 1–8

Sherry Middaugh, the defending champion did not qualify.

=== Prince Edward Island ===
@ the Crapaud Community Curling Club in Crapaud. Rebecca Jean MacPhee clinched the tournament with a 7–5 win over Suzanne Gaudet on January 26.
Results: (teams knocked out after 3 losses)

- Rebecca Jean MacPhee, Charlottetown CC (6–0)
- **Suzanne Gaudet**, Charlottetown CC (4–3)
- Shirley Berry, Cornwall CC (4–3)
- Kathy O'Rourke, Charlottetown CC (3–3)
- Leslie MacDougall, Charlottetown CC (3–3)
- Tammy Dewar, Montague CC (3–3)
- Donna Butler, Cornwall CC (2–3)
- Nola Murphy, Silver Fox Curling & Yacht Club, Summerside (2–3)
- Bev Beaton, Charlottetown CC (1–3)
- Melissa Andrews, Crapaud Community CC (1–3)
- Karen Currie, Cornwall CC (0–3)

=== Quebec ===
@ Le Club de Curling Laval-sur-le-Lac in Laval. Brenda Nicholls defeated Marie-France Larouche 10–9 in the finals on January 30.
Results:
A

- **Marie-France Larouche**, CC Etchemin, Saint-Romuald & CC Victoria, Sainte-Foy (5–1) wins "A1-B1" game, loses final
- Ève Bélisle, CC Lachine/CC Longue-Pointe, Montreal (5–1) loses "A2-B2" game
- Nathalie Gagnon, CC Riverbend, Alma / CC Kénogami Jonquière (4–2)
- Claire Léveillé, CC Rouyn-Noranda (3–3)
- Bonnie Dunn, CC Otterburn Legion/CC Glenmore, Dollard-des-Ormeaux (2–4)
- Ruth Lavoie, CC Kénogami, Jonquière/CC Chicoutimi (1–5)
- Cindy Kyle, CC Glenmore, Dollard-des-Ormeaux (1–5)

B

- Brenda Nicholls, CC Victoria, Sainte-Foy (5–1) loses "A1-B1" game, wins semi-final, wins final
- Chantal Osborne, CC Thurso (5–1) wins "A2-B2" game, loses semi-final
- Élise Lafontaine, CC Laurier, Victoriaville (4–2)
- Cheryl Morgan, CC Longue-Pointe, Montreal/CC Lachine (3–3)
- Louise Desrosiers, CC Victoria, Sainte-Foy (2–4)
- Élaine Roy, CC Kénogami, Jonquière/Port-Alfred, La Baie/CC Chicoutimi (1–5)
- Chatnal Gadoua, CC Lacolle (1–5)

=== Saskatchewan ===
@ the Assiniboia Curling Club in Assiniboia. Stefanie Lawton defeated Sherry Anderson 9–2 in the final on February 6.
Results:

- Stefanie Lawton, CN CC, Saskatoon (5–2) (won semi-final, won final)
- **Sherry Anderson**, Delisle CC (6–1) (lost final)
- Chantelle Eberle, Bushell Park CC, Moose Jaw (5–2) (lost semi-final)
- Cindy Street, Tartan CC, Regina (3–4)
- Jan Betker, Callie CC, Regina (3–4)
- Sue Altman, Foam Lake CC (3–4)
- Michelle Englot, Davidson CC (2–5)
- Heather Torrie, Nutana CC, Saskatoon (1–6)

=== Yukon/Northwest Territories ===
@ the Whitehorse Curling Club in Whitehorse, Yukon. Double-round robin, no final. Kerry Koe wins in a tie-breaker on January 23 over Nicole Baldwin 9–5.

- Kerry Koe, Northwest Territories (4–2) wins tiebreaker 9–5
- Nicole Baldwin, Yukon (4–2) loses tiebreaker 9–5
- Maureen Miller, Northwest Territories (3–3)
- Sandra Mikkelsen, Yukon (1–5)

defending champion Stacey Stable did not qualify
