= Monica Moriarty =

Canadian female curler

- Curler ♀
- Born: Monica Jones

Team
- Curling club: Halifax CC, Mayflower CC

Curling career
- Member Association: Nova Scotia
- Hearts: 6: (1982, 1984, 1989, 1994, 1996, 2005)
- World Championship: 1 (1982)
Medal record
Curling
Representing Nova Scotia
Scott Tournament of Hearts
Gold medal – first place	1982 Regina
Silver medal – second place	1984 Charlottetown

Monica Moriarty (née Jones; born c. 1961) is a Canadian curler.

She won the 1982 Scott Tournament of Hearts and the 1999 Canadian Mixed Championship.

== Teams ==
=== Women's ===
Season	Skip	Third	Second	Lead	Alternate	Coach	Events
1981–82	Colleen Jones	Kay Smith	Monica Jones	Barbara Jones-Gordon			STOH 1982 (gold); WCC 1982 (5th)
1983–84	Colleen Jones	Wendy Currie	Monica Jones	Barbara Jones-Gordon			STOH 1984 (silver)
1988–89	Colleen Jones	Mary Mattatall	Monica Moriarty	Kelly Anderson	Kim Ackles		STOH 1989 (5th)
1993–94	Colleen Jones	Kay Zinck	Angie Romkey	Kim Kelly	Monica Moriarty		STOH 1994 (7th)
1995–96	Colleen Jones	Kay Zinck	Kim Kelly	Nancy Delahunt	Monica Moriarty		STOH 1996 (8th)
2004–05	Kay Zinck	Mary Mattatall	Candice Mittelstadt	Monica Moriarty	Meaghan Smart	Rob Krepps	STOH 2005 (8th)
2006–07	Kay Zinck	Colleen Jones	Mary Mattatall	Monica Moriarty			
2015–16	Monica Moriarty	Karen Langlois	Cheryl Mallett Skelton	Jodi Vacheresse			

=== Mixed ===
Season	Skip	Third	Second	Lead	Events
1998–99	Paul Flemming	Colleen Jones	Tom Fetterly	Monica Moriarty	CMxCC 1999 (gold)
2003–04	Steve Ogden	Monica Moriarty	Jack Robar	Marg Cutcliffe	CMxCC 2004 (5th)

1983 skip Scott Saunders , Third Colleen Jones, Second David Delahunt, Lead Monica Jones

1985 Skip Dave Jones, Third Mary Mattatall, Second Merve Payne, Lead Monica Jones ( Canadian Silver Medallist)

1979 Canada Winter Games (Silver Medallist)

Skip Colleen Jones, Third Sally Saunders, second Margie Knickle, Lead Monica Jones

== Personal life ==
Moriarty is a sister of former teammates Colleen Jones and Barbara Jones-Gordon. Her son Alex Moriarty is also a curler. He competed for the Nova Scotia team at the 2007 Canada Winter Games, while she coached his team. She graduated Dalhousie University. with degrees in Economics and later a Masters in Public Administration and Management. At the time of the 2005 Hearts, she was employed by the Canada Revenue Agency as a tax adviser. She is a CMA, CPA in Nova Scotia and retired in 2022 as an Executive Director of Financial Management.
