= 1999 Canadian Mixed Curling Championship =

- Host city: Victoria, British Columbia
- Arena: Victoria Curling Club
- Dates: January 9–17, 1999
- Winner: Nova Scotia
- Curling club: Mayflower Curling Club, Halifax, Nova Scotia
- Skip: Paul Flemming
- Third: Colleen Jones
- Second: Tom Fetterly
- Lead: Monica Moriarty
- Finalist: Prince Edward Island (Peter MacDonald)

The 1999 Canadian Mixed Curling Championship was held January 9–17 at the Victoria Curling Club in Victoria, British Columbia.

Nova Scotia beat Prince Edward Island in the all-Atlantic final.

== Teams ==
Teams were as follows:

Locale	Skip	Third	Second	Lead
Alberta	Rick Maksymetz	Belle Maksymetz	Allan Tofteland	Trudy Peterson
British Columbia	Eric Wiltzen	Jan Wiltzen	Ken Brown	Valerie Lahucik
Manitoba	Doug Armour	Lisa Roy	Kyle Armour	Paula Armour
New Brunswick	Vance LeCocq	Leanne Richardson	Marc LeCocq	Cindy LeCocq
Newfoundland	Gary Oke	Diane Ryan	Alex Smith	Sandra Sparrow
Northern Ontario	Chris Buchan	Kelly McLellan	Greg McLellan	Linda Sloane
Nova Scotia	Paul Flemming	Colleen Jones	Tom Fetterly	Monica Moriarty
Ontario	Bob Turcotte	Kristin Turcotte	Roy Weigand	Andrea Lawes
Prince Edward Island	Peter MacDonald	Kathy O'Rourke	Mark O'Rourke	Karen MacDonald
Quebec	Daniel Bedard	Catherine Derick	Danny Kyle	Linda Kyle
Saskatchewan	Greg Anholt	Lori McGeary	Kerry Tarasoff	Heather Walsh
Northwest Territories/Yukon	Jamie Koe	Kerry Koe	Fred Koe	Stacey Trepteau

== Standings ==
Final standings

Province	Skip	Wins	Losses
Prince Edward Island	Peter MacDonald	9	2
Ontario	Bob Turcotte	8	3
Nova Scotia	Paul Flemming	8	3
British Columbia	Eric Wiltzen	8	3
Manitoba	Doug Armour	6	5
Alberta	Rick Maksymetz	5	6
Quebec	Daniel Bedard	5	6
Saskatchewan	Greg Anholt	5	6
Northwest Territories / Yukon	Jamie Koe	4	7
Newfoundland	Gary Oke	4	7
New Brunswick	Vance LeCocq	2	9
Northern Ontario	Chris Buchan	2	9

== Playoffs ==
Page playoff system
1	Prince Edward Island	10
2	Ontario	7
3	Nova Scotia	9
4	British Columbia	7

Semifinal
2	Ontario	4
4	Nova Scotia	7

Final
1	Prince Edward Island	4
3	Nova Scotia	9
