= Arleen Day =

Canadian curler

Arleen Marilyn Day (March 7, 1949 – September 4, 2012) was a Canadian curler from Regina, Saskatchewan.

Day was born in Nokomis, Saskatchewan as Arleen Fitzsimmons and grew up in Govan, Saskatchewan. She would later move to Regina to attend business college. She began curling at age 13. In 1982, she skipped her team of Shirley McKendry, Velva Squire and Dorthy Hepper to a provincial championship. At the 1982 Scott Tournament of Hearts, Day and her Saskatchewan rink finished the round robin in a 5-way tie for first place with a 7-3 record. The team beat Alberta's Cathy Shaw in a tie breaker match, but would lose in the semi-final to Nova Scotia's Colleen Jones.

Day was involved in a car accident in 1984, where she injured her back, and by 1986 she could not continue her curling career, so she turned to officiating the sport. She began officiating in 1989 at the Canadian Junior Curling Championships. She was also an official at the 2010 Winter Olympics and was the head official at the 2008 Scotties Tournament of Hearts.

Outside of curling, Day worked for the Government of Saskatchewan.

Day died from lung cancer in Regina, Saskatchewan at the Pasqua Hospital.
