= 1994 Scott Tournament of Hearts =

Canadian women's curling championship

- Host city: Waterloo, Ontario
- Arena: Waterloo Recreational Sports Complex
- Dates: February 26–March 5
- Attendance: 44,495
- Winner: Canada
- Curling club: Caledonian CC, Regina
- Skip: Sandra Peterson
- Third: Jan Betker
- Second: Joan McCusker
- Lead: Marcia Gudereit
- Alternate: Anita Ford
- Finalist: Manitoba (Connie Laliberte)

The 1994 Scott Tournament of Hearts, the Canadian women's national curling championship, was held from February 26 to March 5, 1994, at the Waterloo Recreational Sports Complex in Waterloo, Ontario. The total attendance for the week was 44,495.

Team Canada, who was skipped by Sandra Peterson repeated as champions after defeating Manitoba in the final 5–3. This was the second time that Team Canada has won the event and the second of three skipped by Peterson (later Schmirler). Peterson's rink would go onto again represent Canada at the 1994 World Women's Curling Championship held in Oberstdorf, Germany, in which they defended their title there as well.

== Teams ==
The teams were listed as follows:

Team Canada	Alberta	British Columbia	Manitoba
Caledonian CC, Regina Skip: Sandra Peterson; Third: Jan Betker; Second: Joan McCusker; Lead: Marcia Gudereit (Note: Team Canada alternate Anita Ford threw lead stones in Draw 16.); Alternate: Anita Ford	Grande Prairie CC, Grande Prairie Skip: Gloria Palinkas; Third: Crystal McLeod; Second: Charlene Robinson; Lead: Candy Taylor; Alternate: Karen McNamee	Prince George CC, Prince George Skip: Diane Dalio; Third: Donna Gervais; Second: Rae Ann Copeland; Lead: Lorraine Flannigan; Alternate: Cheryle Wood	Fort Rouge CC, Winnipeg Skip: Connie Laliberte; Third: Karen Purdy; Second: Cathy Gauthier; Lead: Janet Arnott; Alternate: Kristen Kroeker
New Brunswick	Newfoundland	Nova Scotia	Ontario
Thistle St. Andrews CC, Saint John Skip: Heidi Hanlon; Third: Diane Blair; Second: Sheri Stewart; Lead: Judy Blanchard; Alternate: Ellen Brennan	St. John's CC, St. John's Skip: Laura Phillips; Third: Cathy Cunningham; Second: Kathy Kerr; Lead: Heather Martin; Alternate: Susan Thomas	Halifax CC, Halifax Skip: Colleen Jones; Third: Kay Zinck; Second: Angie Romkey; Lead: Kim Kelly; Alternate: Monica Moriarty	Rideau CC, Ottawa Skip: Anne Merklinger; Third: Theresa Breen; Second: Patti McKnight; Lead: Audrey Frey; Alternate: Kristin Turcotte
Prince Edward Island	Quebec	Saskatchewan	Yukon/Northwest Territories
Charlottetown CC, Charlottetown Skip: Shelly Danks; Third: Nancy Reid; Second: Janice MacCullum; Lead: Shelley Muzika; Alternate: Joan Butcher	Buckingham CC, Buckingham Skip: Agnes Charette; Third: France Charette; Second: Chantal Osborne; Lead: Sylvie Daniel; Alternate: Joelle Sabourin	Prince Albert G&CC, Prince Albert Skip: Sherry Anderson; Third: Kay Montgomery; Second: Donna Gignac; Lead: Elaine McCloy; Alternate: Cathy Fahlman	Whitehorse CC, Whitehorse Skip: Shelley Aucoin; Third: Margaret Lawrence; Second: Rose-Marie Baker; Lead: Doris MacKenzie; Alternate: Anne Campbell

== Map of teams ==
Team Canada Provincial Winners

== Round Robin standings ==
Final Round Robin standings

Key
Teams to Playoffs
Teams to Tiebreakers

Team	Skip	W	L	PF	PA	EW	EL	BE	SE	S%
Canada	Sandra Peterson	10	1	84	45	48	39	5	11	83%
Manitoba	Connie Laliberte	8	3	71	67	52	47	5	13	77%
Saskatchewan	Sherry Anderson	7	4	71	66	51	47	10	7	76%
Newfoundland	Laura Phillips	7	4	82	61	50	39	7	16	78%
Prince Edward Island	Shelly Danks	7	4	90	70	48	48	4	12	78%
British Columbia	Diane Dalio	6	5	67	67	50	43	6	16	73%
New Brunswick	Heidi Hanlon	4	7	68	87	49	52	1	11	74%
Nova Scotia	Colleen Jones	4	7	72	63	48	49	6	14	82%
Ontario	Anne Merklinger	4	7	70	84	44	50	2	7	78%
Quebec	Agnes Charette	4	7	65	68	46	44	7	11	77%
Yukon/Northwest Territories	Shelley Aucoin	4	7	57	74	42	49	6	10	70%
Alberta	Gloria Palinkas	1	10	49	94	40	51	3	10	66%

== Round Robin results ==
All draw times are listed in Eastern Standard Time (UTC-05:00).

=== Draw 1 ===
Saturday, February 26, 2:00 pm

Sheet A	1	2	3	4	5	6	7	8	9	10	Final
Canada (Peterson) 🔨	0	2	3	1	1	0	0	0	2	X	9
Alberta (Palinkas)	0	0	0	0	0	1	0	1	0	X	2

Sheet B	1	2	3	4	5	6	7	8	9	10	Final
British Columbia (Dalio) 🔨	4	0	0	0	3	0	0	2	0	0	9
Newfoundland (Phillips)	0	3	0	1	0	3	1	0	1	1	10

Sheet C	1	2	3	4	5	6	7	8	9	10	Final
Manitoba (Laliberte) 🔨	1	0	1	0	0	0	1	1	0	X	4
Prince Edward Island (Danks)	0	3	0	1	0	1	0	0	5	X	10

Sheet D	1	2	3	4	5	6	7	8	9	10	Final
Ontario (Merklinger) 🔨	0	1	0	1	0	0	3	0	1	0	6
Yukon/Northwest Territories (Aucoin)	1	0	2	0	1	1	0	1	0	2	8

=== Draw 2 ===
Saturday, February 26, 7:30 pm

Sheet A	1	2	3	4	5	6	7	8	9	10	Final
Prince Edward Island (Danks) 🔨	4	3	0	1	0	0	1	0	0	X	9
British Columbia (Dalio)	0	0	1	0	1	1	0	1	2	X	6

Sheet B	1	2	3	4	5	6	7	8	9	10	Final
Saskatchewan (Anderson) 🔨	0	2	0	3	0	0	3	0	2	X	10
New Brunswick (Hanlon)	1	0	1	0	1	1	0	1	0	X	5

Sheet C	1	2	3	4	5	6	7	8	9	10	11	Final
Nova Scotia (Jones) 🔨	3	0	1	0	0	0	0	1	0	2	1	8
Quebec (Charette)	0	1	0	1	2	1	0	0	2	0	0	7

Sheet D	1	2	3	4	5	6	7	8	9	10	Final
Newfoundland (Phillips) 🔨	0	1	0	1	0	0	1	0	1	0	4
Canada (Peterson)	1	0	1	0	2	0	0	2	0	1	7

=== Draw 3 ===
Sunday, February 27, 9:30 am

Sheet B	1	2	3	4	5	6	7	8	9	10	Final
Canada (Peterson) 🔨	1	0	1	0	0	3	0	0	0	1	6
Nova Scotia (Jones)	0	1	0	2	0	0	0	1	1	0	5

Sheet C	1	2	3	4	5	6	7	8	9	10	Final
New Brunswick (Hanlon) 🔨	1	0	0	1	0	1	1	0	2	0	6
Ontario (Merklinger)	0	0	3	0	1	0	0	2	0	3	9

=== Draw 4 ===
Sunday, February 27, 2:00 pm

Sheet A	1	2	3	4	5	6	7	8	9	10	11	Final
Yukon/Northwest Territories (Aucoin) 🔨	2	0	1	0	0	0	1	0	1	1	0	6
Manitoba (Laliberte)	0	1	0	2	1	0	0	2	0	0	1	7

Sheet B	1	2	3	4	5	6	7	8	9	10	Final
Quebec (Charette) 🔨	0	0	1	0	0	1	0	1	0	0	3
Saskatchewan (Anderson)	0	1	0	0	1	0	2	0	0	0	4

Sheet C	1	2	3	4	5	6	7	8	9	10	Final
British Columbia (Dalio) 🔨	0	1	2	0	1	1	0	0	1	1	7
Alberta (Palinkas)	0	0	0	1	0	0	2	2	0	0	5

Sheet D	1	2	3	4	5	6	7	8	9	10	11	Final
Nova Scotia (Jones) 🔨	0	0	0	1	1	0	2	1	0	0	0	5
New Brunswick (Hanlon)	0	2	0	0	0	1	0	0	1	1	1	6

=== Draw 5 ===
Sunday, February 27, 7:30 pm

Sheet A	1	2	3	4	5	6	7	8	9	10	Final
Alberta (Palinkas) 🔨	1	0	0	0	0	0	1	1	0	0	3
Quebec (Charette)	0	1	1	0	0	0	0	0	2	1	5

Sheet B	1	2	3	4	5	6	7	8	9	10	Final
Ontario (Merklinger) 🔨	0	0	1	0	2	0	2	0	X	X	5
Prince Edward Island (Danks)	2	2	0	1	0	2	0	6	X	X	13

Sheet C	1	2	3	4	5	6	7	8	9	10	Final
Saskatchewan (Anderson) 🔨	1	0	0	0	1	0	0	0	1	X	3
Yukon/Northwest Territories (Aucoin)	0	0	4	0	0	1	1	1	0	X	7

Sheet D	1	2	3	4	5	6	7	8	9	10	Final
Manitoba (Laliberte) 🔨	1	0	2	0	0	2	0	4	0	X	9
Newfoundland (Phillips)	0	1	0	2	1	0	1	0	1	X	6

=== Draw 6 ===
Monday, February 28, 9:30 am

Sheet A	1	2	3	4	5	6	7	8	9	10	11	Final
Saskatchewan (Anderson) 🔨	0	0	0	0	4	0	0	0	0	1	1	6
Prince Edward Island (Danks)	1	0	0	0	0	2	0	1	1	0	0	5

Sheet B	1	2	3	4	5	6	7	8	9	10	Final
Manitoba (Laliberte) 🔨	0	2	0	0	1	1	0	0	1	0	5
Alberta (Palinkas)	1	0	2	1	0	0	1	1	0	1	7

Sheet C	1	2	3	4	5	6	7	8	9	10	Final
Newfoundland (Phillips) 🔨	0	0	2	1	0	2	1	0	0	X	6
Quebec (Charette)	0	0	0	0	1	0	0	1	1	X	3

Sheet D	1	2	3	4	5	6	7	8	9	10	Final
Yukon/Northwest Territories (Aucoin) 🔨	0	1	0	0	0	1	0	2	0	0	4
British Columbia (Dalio)	0	0	1	1	1	0	1	0	1	1	6

=== Draw 7 ===
Monday, February 28, 2:00 pm

Sheet A	1	2	3	4	5	6	7	8	9	10	Final
British Columbia (Dalio) 🔨	1	0	2	0	0	1	0	1	0	0	5
Nova Scotia (Jones)	0	1	0	0	0	0	1	0	1	1	4

Sheet B	1	2	3	4	5	6	7	8	9	10	Final
Alberta (Palinkas) 🔨	1	0	2	0	0	3	0	1	0	0	7
New Brunswick (Hanlon)	0	1	0	2	2	0	2	0	2	1	10

Sheet C	1	2	3	4	5	6	7	8	9	10	Final
Ontario (Merklinger) 🔨	2	0	0	2	0	0	1	0	2	0	7
Newfoundland (Phillips)	0	0	1	0	1	2	0	2	0	2	8

Sheet D	1	2	3	4	5	6	7	8	9	10	Final
Prince Edward Island (Danks) 🔨	1	0	1	0	2	1	0	1	0	X	6
Canada (Peterson)	0	4	0	1	0	0	1	0	3	X	9

=== Draw 8 ===
Monday, February 28, 7:30 pm

Sheet A	1	2	3	4	5	6	7	8	9	10	Final
Quebec (Charette) 🔨	2	0	2	2	0	1	0	0	2	X	9
Ontario (Merklinger)	0	1	0	0	1	0	2	1	0	X	5

Sheet B	1	2	3	4	5	6	7	8	9	10	Final
Nova Scotia (Jones) 🔨	3	1	0	2	1	1	2	X	X	X	10
Yukon/Northwest Territories (Aucoin)	0	0	1	0	0	0	0	X	X	X	1

Sheet C	1	2	3	4	5	6	7	8	9	10	Final
New Brunswick (Hanlon) 🔨	0	1	0	2	0	0	3	1	0	0	7
Manitoba (Laliberte)	1	0	2	0	1	2	0	0	1	1	8

Sheet D	1	2	3	4	5	6	7	8	9	10	Final
Canada (Peterson) 🔨	2	0	2	0	3	3	X	X	X	X	10
Saskatchewan (Anderson)	0	1	0	1	0	0	X	X	X	X	2

=== Draw 9 ===
Tuesday, March 1, 9:30 am

Sheet A	1	2	3	4	5	6	7	8	9	10	Final
Newfoundland (Phillips) 🔨	1	0	2	0	3	4	X	X	X	X	10
New Brunswick (Hanlon)	0	1	0	2	0	0	X	X	X	X	3

Sheet B	1	2	3	4	5	6	7	8	9	10	Final
Ontario (Merklinger) 🔨	1	3	0	3	0	0	3	X	X	X	10
Alberta (Palinkas)	0	0	1	0	1	1	0	X	X	X	3

Sheet C	1	2	3	4	5	6	7	8	9	10	11	Final
Nova Scotia (Jones) 🔨	1	0	0	2	0	0	1	0	1	0	0	5
Prince Edward Island (Danks)	0	2	1	0	0	0	0	1	0	1	1	6

Sheet D	1	2	3	4	5	6	7	8	9	10	Final
Quebec (Charette) 🔨	0	0	0	2	0	1	0	2	0	0	5
Manitoba (Laliberte)	0	1	1	0	1	0	1	0	0	2	6

=== Draw 10 ===
Tuesday, March 1, 2:00 pm

Sheet A	1	2	3	4	5	6	7	8	9	10	Final
Manitoba (Laliberte) 🔨	1	0	0	1	0	1	0	0	1	1	5
Nova Scotia (Jones)	0	1	1	0	1	0	1	0	0	0	4

Sheet B	1	2	3	4	5	6	7	8	9	10	11	Final
Prince Edward Island (Danks) 🔨	0	0	4	0	0	2	0	3	0	1	0	10
Quebec (Charette)	1	1	0	0	4	0	3	0	1	0	1	11

Sheet C	1	2	3	4	5	6	7	8	9	10	Final
Yukon/Northwest Territories (Aucoin) 🔨	1	0	0	1	0	1	0	0	2	X	5
Canada (Peterson)	0	1	0	0	3	0	0	2	0	X	6

Sheet D	1	2	3	4	5	6	7	8	9	10	Final
British Columbia (Dalio) 🔨	0	1	1	0	0	1	0	1	0	1	5
Saskatchewan (Anderson)	0	0	0	0	2	0	0	0	1	0	3

=== Draw 11 ===
Tuesday, March 1, 7:30 pm

Sheet A	1	2	3	4	5	6	7	8	9	10	11	Final
Saskatchewan (Anderson) 🔨	1	0	0	2	0	3	0	0	1	1	2	10
Newfoundland (Phillips)	0	0	2	0	1	0	3	2	0	0	0	8

Sheet B	1	2	3	4	5	6	7	8	9	10	Final
New Brunswick (Hanlon) 🔨	2	0	2	0	0	0	1	0	1	1	7
British Columbia (Dalio)	0	1	0	1	1	2	0	1	0	0	6

Sheet C	1	2	3	4	5	6	7	8	9	10	Final
Alberta (Palinkas) 🔨	1	0	0	0	1	0	1	0	1	X	4
Yukon/Northwest Territories (Aucoin)	0	1	1	1	0	1	0	2	0	X	6

Sheet D	1	2	3	4	5	6	7	8	9	10	Final
Canada (Peterson) 🔨	1	0	0	2	2	5	X	X	X	X	10
Ontario (Merklinger)	0	0	1	0	0	0	X	X	X	X	1

=== Draw 12 ===
Wednesday, March 2, 9:30 am

Sheet A	1	2	3	4	5	6	7	8	9	10	Final
New Brunswick (Hanlon) 🔨	0	0	1	0	0	1	0	2	0	X	4
Canada (Peterson)	1	0	0	2	1	0	2	0	3	X	9

Sheet B	1	2	3	4	5	6	7	8	9	10	Final
Newfoundland (Phillips) 🔨	2	0	0	1	0	1	2	4	X	X	10
Yukon/Northwest Territories (Aucoin)	0	0	1	0	1	0	0	0	X	X	2

Sheet C	1	2	3	4	5	6	7	8	9	10	Final
Quebec (Charette) 🔨	1	0	0	0	2	0	0	0	1	X	4
British Columbia (Dalio)	0	2	0	0	0	3	0	2	0	X	7

Sheet D	1	2	3	4	5	6	7	8	9	10	Final
Saskatchewan (Anderson) 🔨	2	0	2	0	2	2	0	3	X	X	11
Alberta (Palinkas)	0	1	0	1	0	0	2	0	X	X	4

=== Draw 13 ===
Wednesday, March 2, 2:00 pm

Sheet A	1	2	3	4	5	6	7	8	9	10	Final
Ontario (Merklinger) 🔨	1	0	1	1	0	4	0	1	0	2	10
Nova Scotia (Jones)	0	1	0	0	2	0	3	0	2	0	8

Sheet B	1	2	3	4	5	6	7	8	9	10	Final
Manitoba (Laliberte) 🔨	0	0	1	0	1	0	0	1	0	X	3
Saskatchewan (Anderson)	0	0	0	1	0	5	1	0	1	X	8

Sheet C	1	2	3	4	5	6	7	8	9	10	Final
Prince Edward Island (Danks) 🔨	2	0	1	0	3	0	2	0	1	0	9
New Brunswick (Hanlon)	0	1	0	2	0	2	0	1	0	2	8

Sheet D	1	2	3	4	5	6	7	8	9	10	Final
Yukon/Northwest Territories (Aucoin) 🔨	0	4	0	1	0	1	0	0	0	X	6
Quebec (Charette)	1	0	1	0	4	0	1	0	1	X	8

=== Draw 14 ===
Wednesday, March 2, 7:30 pm

Sheet A	1	2	3	4	5	6	7	8	9	10	Final
British Columbia (Dalio) 🔨	0	1	1	0	1	0	1	0	0	1	5
Ontario (Merklinger)	0	0	0	2	0	1	0	1	0	0	4

Sheet B	1	2	3	4	5	6	7	8	9	10	Final
Nova Scotia (Jones) 🔨	1	0	0	1	0	1	0	2	0	X	5
Newfoundland (Phillips)	0	1	1	0	0	0	0	0	1	X	3

Sheet C	1	2	3	4	5	6	7	8	9	10	11	Final
Canada (Peterson) 🔨	1	0	0	1	0	2	0	1	0	0	0	5
Manitoba (Laliberte)	0	1	0	0	1	0	1	0	1	1	1	6

Sheet D	1	2	3	4	5	6	7	8	9	10	Final
Alberta (Palinkas) 🔨	2	0	1	0	1	1	0	1	0	X	6
Prince Edward Island (Danks)	0	1	0	2	0	0	4	0	2	X	9

=== Draw 15 ===
Thursday, March 3, 9:30 am

Sheet A	1	2	3	4	5	6	7	8	9	10	Final
Prince Edward Island (Danks) 🔨	0	3	0	1	1	0	0	0	4	X	9
Yukon/Northwest Territories (Aucoin)	0	0	2	0	0	1	1	0	0	X	4

Sheet B	1	2	3	4	5	6	7	8	9	10	Final
Canada (Peterson) 🔨	1	3	0	1	0	0	1	0	0	1	7
British Columbia (Dalio)	0	0	1	0	2	1	0	0	2	0	6

Sheet C	1	2	3	4	5	6	7	8	9	10	11	Final
Saskatchewan (Anderson) 🔨	1	0	0	1	0	2	2	0	1	0	1	8
Nova Scotia (Jones)	0	1	1	0	3	0	0	1	0	1	0	7

Sheet D	1	2	3	4	5	6	7	8	9	10	Final
Manitoba (Laliberte) 🔨	2	0	1	0	0	2	1	0	2	X	8
Ontario (Merklinger)	0	1	0	1	1	0	0	1	0	X	4

=== Draw 16 ===
Thursday, March 3, 2:00 pm

Sheet A	1	2	3	4	5	6	7	8	9	10	Final
Alberta (Palinkas) 🔨	1	0	1	0	0	0	X	X	X	X	2
Newfoundland (Phillips)	0	4	0	2	1	4	X	X	X	X	11

Sheet B	1	2	3	4	5	6	7	8	9	10	Final
Quebec (Charette) 🔨	1	0	0	1	0	1	0	1	0	0	4
Canada (Peterson)	0	1	0	0	1	0	2	0	1	1	6

Sheet C	1	2	3	4	5	6	7	8	9	10	Final
Ontario (Merklinger) 🔨	1	0	2	0	1	1	0	2	1	1	9
Saskatchewan (Anderson)	0	1	0	3	0	0	2	0	0	0	6

Sheet D	1	2	3	4	5	6	7	8	9	10	Final
Yukon/Northwest Territories (Aucoin) 🔨	0	1	0	2	0	1	1	0	2	1	8
New Brunswick (Hanlon)	1	0	2	0	1	0	0	1	0	0	5

=== Draw 17 ===
Thursday, March 3, 7:30 pm

Sheet A	1	2	3	4	5	6	7	8	9	10	Final
New Brunswick (Hanlon) 🔨	2	0	2	0	1	0	0	1	0	1	7
Quebec (Charette)	0	1	0	1	0	1	1	0	2	0	6

Sheet B	1	2	3	4	5	6	7	8	9	10	Final
British Columbia (Dalio) 🔨	1	0	2	0	0	1	0	2	0	X	5
Manitoba (Laliberte)	0	2	0	2	2	0	2	0	2	X	10

Sheet C	1	2	3	4	5	6	7	8	9	10	Final
Newfoundland (Phillips) 🔨	1	0	1	1	1	0	1	0	0	1	6
Prince Edward Island (Danks)	0	1	0	0	0	1	0	1	1	0	4

Sheet D	1	2	3	4	5	6	7	8	9	10	Final
Nova Scotia (Jones) 🔨	3	0	2	0	0	0	3	0	3	X	11
Alberta (Palinkas)	0	1	0	1	2	1	0	1	0	X	6

== Tiebreakers ==
			To Semifinal
			1	Saskatchewan	8
2	Newfoundland	8		Newfoundland	4
3	Prince Edward Island	7

=== Round 1 ===
Friday, March 4, 9:30 am

Sheet C	1	2	3	4	5	6	7	8	9	10	Final
Newfoundland (Phillips) 🔨	0	2	1	0	1	0	3	0	0	1	8
Prince Edward Island (Danks)	1	0	0	1	0	1	0	3	1	0	7

Player percentages
Newfoundland		Prince Edward Island	
Heather Martin	79%	Shelley Muzika	78%
Kathy Kerr	78%	Janice MacCullum	84%
Cathy Cunningham	85%	Nancy Reid	80%
Laura Phillips	66%	Shelly Danks	71%
Total	77%	Total	78%

=== Round 2 ===
Friday, March 4, 2:00 pm

Sheet C	1	2	3	4	5	6	7	8	9	10	Final
Newfoundland (Phillips) 🔨	0	1	0	1	1	0	1	0	0	X	4
Saskatchewan (Anderson)	2	0	3	0	0	1	0	1	1	X	8

Player percentages
Newfoundland		Saskatchewan	
Heather Martin	89%	Elaine McCloy	71%
Kathy Kerr	76%	Donna Gignac	78%
Cathy Cunningham	71%	Kay Montgomery	91%
Laura Phillips	63%	Sherry Anderson	69%
Total	75%	Total	78%

== Playoffs ==
Semifinal			Final
			1	Canada	5
2	Manitoba	5	2	Manitoba	3
3	Saskatchewan	3

=== Semifinal ===
Friday, March 4, 7:30 pm

Sheet C	1	2	3	4	5	6	7	8	9	10	Final
Saskatchewan (Anderson)	0	0	0	1	1	0	0	0	1	X	3
Manitoba (Laliberte) 🔨	0	1	2	0	0	0	0	2	0	X	5

Player percentages
Saskatchewan		Manitoba	
Elaine McCloy	70%	Janet Arnott	88%
Donna Gignac	90%	Cathy Gauthier	86%
Kay Montgomery	86%	Karen Purdy	85%
Sherry Anderson	80%	Connie Laliberte	82%
Total	82%	Total	85%

=== Final ===
Saturday, March 5, 1:00 pm

Sheet C	1	2	3	4	5	6	7	8	9	10	Final
Canada (Peterson) 🔨	1	0	0	0	1	0	0	0	0	3	5
Manitoba (Laliberte)	0	0	0	1	0	0	2	0	0	0	3

Player percentages
Canada		Manitoba	
Marcia Gudereit	79%	Janet Arnott	94%
Joan McCusker	73%	Cathy Gauthier	70%
Jan Betker	81%	Karen Purdy	84%
Sandra Peterson	86%	Connie Laliberte	85%
Total	80%	Total	83%

== Statistics ==
=== Top 5 player percentages ===
Final Round Robin Percentages

Key
All-Star Team

Leads	%
(Nova Scotia) Kim Kelly	89
(Manitoba) Janet Arnott	85
(Canada) Marcia Gudereit	83
(Ontario) Audrey Frey	80
(Newfoundland and Labrador) Heather Martin	80

Seconds	%
(Canada) Joan McCusker	85
(Ontario) Patti McKnight	84
(Nova Scotia) Angie Romkey	82
(Prince Edward Island) Janice MacCallum	81
(Quebec) Chantal Osborne	78

Thirds	%
(Canada) Jan Betker	83
(Nova Scotia) Kay Zinck	82
(Ontario) Theresa Breen	78
(Saskatchewan) Kay Montgomery	78
(Newfoundland and Labrador) Cathy Cunningham	77

Skips	%
(Canada) Sandra Peterson	80
(Newfoundland and Labrador) Laura Phillips	78
(Prince Edward Island) Shelly Danks	76
(Manitoba) Connie Laliberte	75
(British Columbia) Diane Dalio	75
(Saskatchewan) Sherry Anderson	75
(Quebec) Agnes Charette	75
(Nova Scotia) Colleen Jones	75

=== Perfect games ===
Player	Team	Position	Shots	Opponent
Janet Arnott	Manitoba	Lead	20	Saskatchewan
Heather Martin	Newfoundland	Lead	12	Alberta

== Awards ==
The all-star team and sportsmanship award winners were as follows:

=== All-Star Team ===
Position	Name	Team
Skip	Laura Phillips	Newfoundland
Third	Jan Betker (2)	Canada
Second	Joan McCusker	Canada
Lead	Kim Kelly (2)	Nova Scotia

=== Effie Hezzelwood Award ===
The Scotties Tournament of Hearts Sportsmanship Award is presented to the curler who best embodies the spirit of curling at the Scotties Tournament of Hearts. The winner was selected in a vote by all players at the tournament.

Prior to 1998, the award was named after a notable individual in the curling community where the tournament was held that year. For this edition, the award was named after Effie Hezzelwood, who competed on Ontario provincial championship winning rinks in 1959 and 1960 and senior championship teams in 1967 and 1971 and was part of the Diamond senior competition winning team in 1983. She was the recipient of the Labatt Award for her contribution to curling in 1983 and honoured with the Canadian Ladies Curling Association Award in 1986 for dedication and outstanding service.

Name	Team	Position
Patti McKnight	Ontario	Second
