= Corinne Peters =

Canadian curler

- Curler
- Other names: Corinne Webb
- Born: October 21, 1960 (age 66); Winnipeg, Manitoba

Curling career
- Hearts: 2 (1984, 1993)
- World Championship: 1 (1984)
Medal record
Women's curling
Representing Canada
World Championships
Gold medal – first place	1984 Duluth
Representing Manitoba
Scotties Tournament of Hearts
Gold medal – first place	1984 Charlottetown
Canadian Olympic Curling Trials
Silver medal – second place	1987 Calgary

Corinne Peters (née Laliberte; born 1960) is a Canadian curler from Winnipeg, Manitoba. She is the twin sister of Connie Laliberte, with whom she played on the Canadian and World championship team of 1984. She was also known as Corrine Webb and played as alternate for Laliberte at the 1993 Scott Tournament of Hearts.

Peters was inducted into the Manitoba Curling Hall of Fame in 2001.
