= Connie Laliberte =

Canadian curler

- Curler
- Other names: Connie Salina
- Born: October 21, 1960 (age 66); Winnipeg, Manitoba, Canada

Curling career
- Hearts: 9 (1980, 1984, 1992, 1993, 1994, 1995, 1996, 1999, 2000)
- World Championship: 3 (1984, 1992, 1995)
Medal record
Women's curling
Representing Canada
World Championships
Gold medal – first place	1984 Duluth
Silver medal – second place	1995 Brandon
Bronze medal – third place	1992 Garmisch-Partenkirchen
Representing Manitoba
Scotties Tournament of Hearts
Gold medal – first place	1984 Charlottetown
Gold medal – first place	1992 Halifax
Gold medal – first place	1995 Calgary
Silver medal – second place	1994 Kitchener
Bronze medal – third place	1996 Thunder Bay
Bronze medal – third place	1999 Charlottetown
Bronze medal – third place	2000 Prince George
Canadian Olympic Curling Trials
Silver medal – second place	1987 Calgary
Women's field hockey
Representing Manitoba
Canada Summer Games
Bronze medal – third place	1981 Thunder Bay

Connie Laliberte (born October 21, 1960) is a Canadian retired curler from Manitoba and world champion.

In 2019, Laliberte was named the tenth greatest Canadian curler in history in a TSN poll of broadcasters, reporters and top curlers.

== Field hockey ==
In addition to curling, Laliberte played field hockey in her youth, helping Manitoba win a bronze medal at the 1981 Canada Games. She won another bronze medal that year for Manitoba at the Canadian Senior Championships. She was a member of the Canada women's national field hockey team, and was even considered to be a member of the team for the 1984 Summer Olympics, but she opted to focus on curling instead.

== Curling career ==
=== Juniors ===
Laliberte won two provincial junior championships playing for Patti Vande in 1976 and 1977.

=== Women's ===
She won her first provincial championship in 1980, playing lead for Donna Brownridge. Representing Manitoba, the team finished with a 4–6 record at the 1980 Canadian Ladies Curling Association Championship. The following season, she began skipping her own team at the provincial championship.

Laliberte won her first provincial title as a skip in 1984, when she defeated Karen Fallis in the provincial final. This sent her and her rink of Chris More, twin sister Corinne Peters and older sister Janet Arnott to the 1984 Scott Tournament of Hearts, where they would represent Manitoba. There, Laliberte led her rink to an 8–2 robin record. In the playoffs, they defeated British Columbia's Lindsay Sparkes rink in the semifinal, then Nova Scotia, skipped by Colleen Jones in the final. This sent her team to represent Canada at the 1984 World Women's Curling Championship. At the Worlds, she led Canada to an 8–1 round robin record. In the playoffs, she beat Norway's Ellen Githmark in the semifinal and Switzerland's Brigitte Kienast in the final. The following season, Fallis eliminated the defending World Champions from attempting to defend their title, when they beat Team Laliberte in the Manitoba playodowns.

In December 1986, the team, with new third Janet Harvey was selected to play in the 1987 Canadian Olympic Curling Trials following a training camp. At the trials, the team finished the round robin with a 5–2 record. In the playoffs they beat Pat Sanders before losing to Linda Moore in the final, missing an opportunity to represent Canada at the 1988 Winter Olympics where curling was a demonstration sport.

Laliberte did not win another provincial championship until 1992, coming the closest in 1991 when she lost in the Manitoba final to Kathie Allardyce. In 1992, she defeated Karen Purdy in the provincial final with new teammates Cathy Gauthier at second and Laurie Allen at third, who had joined the rink three years prior. At the 1992 Scott Tournament of Hearts, Laliberte led her rink to a 9–2 round robin record. In the playoffs, she defeated British Columbia's Lisa Walker rink in the semifinal, then the defending champion Julie Sutton rink, representing Team Canada in the final. Laliberte had less success at the 1992 World Women's Curling Championship. After going 5–4 in the round robin, she lost to Sweden and Elisabet Johansson in the semifinal.

The win at the 1992 Hearts qualified Laliberte and her rink to represent Team Canada at the 1993 Scott Tournament of Hearts. There, the team missed the playoffs after finishing with a 6–5 record.

Laliberte won her fourth provincial title in 1994, when she and her rink of new third Karen Purdy, Gauthier and Arnott defeated Darcy Robertson in the Manitoba final. At the 1994 Scott Tournament of Hearts, she led her rink to an 8–3 record. In the playoff's she defeated Saskatchewan's Sherry Anderson, before losing to Team Canada's Sandra Peterson (Schmirler) rink in the final. Laliberte was selected as skip on the tournament's All-Star team.

Team Laliberte won their second straight provincial title in 1995, defeating Janet Harvey in the Manitoba final. After winning the championship, the team's third, Karen Purdy broke her ankle outside of the Fort Rouge Curling Club, forcing her to miss the 1995 Scott Tournament of Hearts. She would be replaced on the team by Harvey's third, Cathy Overton-Clapham. At the '95 Hearts, the team led the round robin with a 10–1 record. They won both of their playoff games, beating Sandra Peterson and Team Canada in the 1 vs. 2 page playoff, and then Alberta's Cathy Borst in the final. At the 1995 World Women's Curling Championship, the team went 8–1, then beat Germany and Andrea Schöpp in the semifinal before losing to Sweden and Elisabet Gustafson in the final.

Purdy re-joined the team to start the 1995–96 season, but was replaced by Overton-Clapham in November, causing controversy in Manitoba curling circles. As defending champions, the team represented Team Canada at the 1996 Scott Tournament of Hearts. There, the team finished the round robin with a 6–5 record, in a five-way tie for fourth. The team managed through the tiebreakers, beating Prince Edward Island (Susan McInnis) and Manitoba (Maureen Bonar). In the playoffs, they defeated Saskatchewan, skipped Sherry Scheirich (Middaugh) before losing the semifinal to Ontario's Marilyn Bodogh rink. Only a few days after the Hearts, Cathy Gauthier was removed from the team, and replaced by Laliberte's twin sister Corinne (now Webb) who hadn't curled in three years. The following year, the team made it to the Manitoba final again, but lost to Janet Harvey, who was seeking revenge for losing Overton-Clapham to Laliberte the previous season.

Jill Staub joined the Laliberte rink at second in March 1997, replacing Webb. The team was the final rink to qualify for the 1997 Canadian Olympic Curling Trials, winning the SaskPower Final Draw event in March 1997, defeating Maureen Bonar for the final spot. The team finished with a disappointing 3–6 record at the trials, missing the playoffs.

Laliberte didn't win another provincial title until 1999, when she beat Shauna Tataryn in the final. The team had a new second for the season, Debbie Jones-Walker. At the 1999 Scott Tournament of Hearts, the team finished with a 8–3 record following the round robin, good enough for first place. In the playoffs, they lost the 1 vs. 2 game to Nova Scotia (Colleen Jones), and then the semifinal to Canada (Cathy Borst).

The team won the 2000 Manitoba Hearts without Laliberte, who was recovering from giving birth to her son, Cody. Laliberte was back on the team for the 2000 Scott Tournament of Hearts, leading Team Manitoba to a 9–2 round robin record. In the playoffs, the team lost both of their playoff matches, against Ontario (Anne Merklinger) in the 1 vs. 2 game and British Columbia (Kelley Law) in the semifinal. Laliberte was selected as the tournament's all-star skip. Following the 2000 Hearts, Laliberte announced she was retiring from competitive curling, citing the birth of her son and the recent death of Sandra Schmirler as aiding her decision. However, she did play in some competitive events for a few more seasons.

Laliberte was inducted into the Canadian Curling Hall of Fame in 2000.

== Personal life ==
Laliberte is married to fellow curler Charlie Salina. She served as Curl Manitoba's High Performance Director from 2004 to 2022. She attended the University of Manitoba.
