= Kay Zinck =

Canadian curler (1961–2022)

- Curler ♀
- Born: Kathleen Shirley Smith; July 14, 1961; Truro, Nova Scotia
- Died: October 1, 2022 (aged 61); Halifax, Nova Scotia

Team
- Curling club: Halifax CC, Mayflower CC

Curling career
- Member Association: Nova Scotia
- Hearts: 6 (1982, 1993, 1994, 1996, 2000, 2005)
- World Championship: 1 (1982)
Medal record
Women's Curling
Representing Nova Scotia
Scott Tournament of Hearts
| Gold medal – first place | 1982 Regina |

Kathleen Shirley Zinck (née Smith; July 14, 1961 – October 1, 2022) was a Canadian curler. She won the Tournament of Hearts national women's championship in 1982.

== Early life ==
Zinck was born in Truro, Nova Scotia, the daughter of Russell Smith and Helen MacDonald. She grew up in Truro, where she graduated high school at the Cobequid Education Centre.

== Career ==
As a junior curler, Zinck won two provincial junior championships in 1978 and 1980. In 1978, she led her Nova Scotia rink of Krista Gatchell, Cathy Caudle and Peggy Wilson to a 6–4 record at the Canadian Junior Curling Championships, good enough for a tie for third place. In 1980, she led the same team to a national junior championship, defeating Manitoba in the final, and finished the event with a 9–2 record.

Two years later, while attending at Dalhousie University, Zinck joined the Colleen Jones rink as her third. The team won the Nova Scotia provincial women's championship in 1982, and went on to represent the province at the national Tournament of Hearts. There, the team won the championship, and went on to represent Canada at the 1982 World Women's Curling Championship. At the Worlds, the team lost both of their tiebreaker matches, and missed the playoffs. Zinck would go on to graduate from Dalhousie with a degree in physiotherapy.

As a member of the Jones rink, Zinck won three more provincial titles, in 1993, 1994 and 1996. Playing second on the team, they finished with a 6–5 record at the 1993 Scott Tournament of Hearts, tied for fourth. In 1994, Zinck was the third on the team again, and they finished with a 4–7 record at the 1993 Scott Tournament of Hearts. At the 1996 Scott Tournament of Hearts, the team made it to a tiebreaker match after finishing the round robin with a 6–5 record. After beating British Columbia in the first tiebreaker, they lost to Manitoba in the second. Zinck left the team the next season, but won provincial titles as a skip in 2000 and 2005. At the 2000 Scott Tournament of Hearts, she led her rink of Heather Smith-Dacey, Krista Bernard and Laine Peters to a 7–4 round robin record. This put them in a tiebreaker against BC's Kelley Law rink, which they lost, settling for fifth place. At the 2005 Scott Tournament of Hearts, she led her team of Mary Mattatall, Candice Mittelstadt and Monica Moriarty to a 5–6 record, missing the playoffs.

Zinck also won a provincial mixed title in 1991, playing third for Myers. The team represented Nova Scotia at that year's Canadian Mixed Curling Championship, where they finished with a 4–7 record.

== Personal life ==
Zinck worked as a physiotherapist. Zinck was married and had three children. She died on October 1, 2022, at the Queen Elizabeth II Health Sciences Centre in Halifax, Nova Scotia, at the age of 61.
