= 1982 Scott Tournament of Hearts =

Canadian women's curling championship

- Host city: Regina, Saskatchewan
- Arena: Agridome
- Dates: February 27–March 6
- Attendance: 12,896
- Winner: Nova Scotia
- Curling club: Halifax CC, Halifax
- Skip: Colleen Jones
- Third: Kay Smith
- Second: Monica Jones
- Lead: Barb Jones-Gordon
- Finalist: Manitoba (Dot Rose)

The 1982 Scott Tournament of Hearts, the Canadian women's curling championship, was held February 27 to March 6, 1982 in Regina, Saskatchewan. It was the first time the championship would go by the Scott name. The total attendance for the event was 12,896.

The playoff was modified for the first time with four teams now entering the semifinal with the semifinal winners advancing to the final. Previously, the top three teams advanced with the top seed in the round robin advancing directly to the final against the semifinal winner.

Team Nova Scotia, who was skipped by Colleen Jones won the event as they defeated Saskatchewan in the semifinal 11–4, then Manitoba in the final 8–7. At 22 years of age, Jones became the youngest skip to win a Canadian women's curling championship. This was the first championship for Nova Scotia and the first of a record six championships skipped by Jones. However, due to career, marriage, and family commitments, it would be another 17 years before Jones would win another championship.

The Jones rink would go onto represent Canada at the 1982 World Women's Curling Championship in Geneva, Switzerland where they would finish fifth and missing the playoffs after losing two tiebreaker games to Scotland and Norway.

== Teams ==
The teams were listed as follows:

Alberta	British Columbia	Manitoba	New Brunswick
Crestwood CC, Edmonton Skip: Cathy Shaw; Third: Karen Jones; Second: Sandra Rippel; Lead: Donna Martineau	Comox Valley CC, Courtenay Skip: Barbara Parker; Third: Sharon Hastings; Second: Donna Cunliffe; Lead: Sheila Mellis	Deer Lodge CC, Winnipeg Skip: Dot Rose; Third: Lynne Andrews; Second: Kim Crass; Lead: Shannon Burns	Campbellton CC, Campbellton Skip: Louise Ouellet; Third: Chantel Vautour; Second: Sheila Walter; Lead: Martha Smith
Newfoundland	Nova Scotia	Ontario	Prince Edward Island
Corner Brook CC, Corner Brook Skip: Lori Quinn; Third: Diane Ryan-LeDrew; Second: Mary Lou Wall; Lead: Karen McIntee	Halifax CC, Halifax Skip: Colleen Jones; Third: Kay Smith; Second: Monica Jones; Lead: Barb Jones-Gordon	Royal Canadian CC, Toronto Skip: Carol Thompson; Third: Lynn Reynolds; Second: Lindy Marchuk; Lead: Wendy Inouye	Charlottetown CC, Charlottetown Skip: Gloria Large; Third: Wanda Aulenback; Second: Diane Bradley; Lead: Irene MacDonald
Quebec	Saskatchewan	Yukon/Northwest Territories
Laviolette CC, Trois-Rivières Skip: Helene Tousignant; Third: Marie Ferland; Second: Diane Caron; Lead: Denise Grange	Caledonian CC, Regina Skip: Arleen Day; Third: Shirley McKendry; Second: Velva Squire; Lead: Dorthy Hepper	Takhini CC, Whitehorse Skip: Arenlea Felker; Third: Laurel Baldwin; Second: Arlene Bond; Lead: Beverly Buckway

== Map of teams ==
Provincial Winners

== Round Robin standings ==
Final Round Robin Standings

Key
Teams to Playoffs
Teams to Tie-Breakers

Team	Skip	W	L	PF	PA	EW	EL	BE	SE	S%
Nova Scotia	Colleen Jones	7	3	80	49	42	40	5	14	70%
Manitoba	Dot Rose	7	3	76	56	45	34	3	14	67%
British Columbia	Barbara Parker	7	3	72	61	45	35	9	14	68%
Alberta	Cathy Shaw	7	3	73	53	40	32	5	20	65%
Saskatchewan	Arleen Day	7	3	72	56	47	37	5	20	69%
Ontario	Carol Thompson	6	4	67	61	43	45	4	10	68%
Newfoundland	Lori Quinn	4	6	56	59	38	39	8	13	62%
Yukon/Northwest Territories	Arenlea Felker	3	7	58	80	39	47	1	12	55%
Quebec	Helene Tousignant	3	7	47	65	33	44	5	8	60%
Prince Edward Island	Gloria Large	2	8	40	78	33	40	6	7	53%
New Brunswick	Louise Ouellet	2	8	51	74	36	48	4	7	58%

== Round Robin results ==
All draw times are listed in Central Standard Time (UTC-06:00).

=== Draw 1 ===
Saturday, February 27, 8:00 pm

Sheet A	1	2	3	4	5	6	7	8	9	10	Final
Ontario (Thompson) 🔨	0	1	0	0	1	1	0	2	0	1	6
Newfoundland (Quinn)	1	0	2	0	0	0	1	0	1	0	5

Sheet B	1	2	3	4	5	6	7	8	9	10	Final
Prince Edward Island (Large)	1	1	0	3	0	1	0	0	1	0	7
New Brunswick (Ouellet) 🔨	0	0	1	0	2	0	1	2	0	0	6

Sheet C	1	2	3	4	5	6	7	8	9	10	Final
Alberta (Shaw)	1	0	0	2	1	0	1	0	2	X	7
Quebec (Tousignant)	0	0	1	0	0	0	0	2	0	X	3

Sheet D	1	2	3	4	5	6	7	8	9	10	Final
Manitoba (Rose)	1	0	1	1	1	2	3	0	2	X	11
Yukon/Northwest Territories (Felker) 🔨	0	1	0	0	0	0	0	3	0	X	4

Sheet E	1	2	3	4	5	6	7	8	9	10	11	Final
Nova Scotia (Jones) 🔨	0	1	0	2	2	0	0	0	0	0	0	5
Saskatchewan (Day)	0	0	2	0	0	1	1	0	0	1	2	7

=== Draw 2 ===
Sunday, February 28, 1:30 pm

Sheet A	1	2	3	4	5	6	7	8	9	10	Final
Quebec (Tousignant) 🔨	1	0	0	1	1	0	0	0	0	X	3
Yukon/Northwest Territories (Felker)	0	1	1	0	0	1	1	1	2	X	7

Sheet B	1	2	3	4	5	6	7	8	9	10	Final
Nova Scotia (Jones)	0	1	0	0	3	1	0	2	0	X	7
Prince Edward Island (Large) 🔨	1	0	0	0	0	0	1	0	1	X	3

Sheet C	1	2	3	4	5	6	7	8	9	10	Final
Newfoundland (Quinn) 🔨	1	0	0	0	0	0	0	0	0	X	1
Saskatchewan (Day)	0	1	1	1	1	0	0	1	2	X	7

Sheet D	1	2	3	4	5	6	7	8	9	10	Final
Ontario (Thompson)	1	0	0	0	0	1	0	1	0	2	5
British Columbia (Parker) 🔨	0	0	0	1	1	0	1	0	1	0	4

Sheet E	1	2	3	4	5	6	7	8	9	10	Final
Alberta (Shaw)	0	1	1	1	1	2	0	3	X	X	9
New Brunswick (Ouellet) 🔨	0	0	0	0	0	0	1	0	X	X	1

=== Draw 3 ===
Sunday, February 28, 7:30 pm

Sheet A	1	2	3	4	5	6	7	8	9	10	11	Final
Saskatchewan (Day)	0	0	1	1	2	0	2	0	0	2	0	8
British Columbia (Parker)🔨	0	2	0	0	0	3	0	1	2	0	2	10

Sheet B	1	2	3	4	5	6	7	8	9	10	Final
Alberta (Shaw)	0	0	0	1	0	0	X	X	X	X	1
Nova Scotia (Jones) 🔨	2	2	2	0	4	1	X	X	X	X	11

Sheet C	1	2	3	4	5	6	7	8	9	10	11	Final
Yukon/Northwest Territories (Felker)	1	0	0	1	0	0	1	0	3	0	1	7
New Brunswick (Ouellet) 🔨	0	1	1	0	0	2	0	1	0	1	0	6

Sheet D	1	2	3	4	5	6	7	8	9	10	Final
Quebec (Tousignant) 🔨	1	0	0	2	0	1	0	0	1	0	5
Manitoba (Rose)	0	0	2	0	1	0	2	1	0	0	6

Sheet E	1	2	3	4	5	6	7	8	9	10	Final
Newfoundland (Quinn) 🔨	1	2	1	0	1	0	1	1	0	X	7
Prince Edward Island (Large)	0	0	0	1	0	1	0	0	1	X	3

=== Draw 4 ===
Monday, March 1, 1:30 pm

Sheet A	1	2	3	4	5	6	7	8	9	10	Final
New Brunswick (Ouellet)	0	0	1	0	0	1	0	X	X	X	2
Manitoba (Rose) 🔨	1	2	0	4	1	0	2	X	X	X	10

Sheet B	1	2	3	4	5	6	7	8	9	10	Final
Newfoundland (Quinn) 🔨	0	0	1	0	0	1	0	X	X	X	2
Alberta (Shaw)	0	2	0	0	4	0	4	X	X	X	10

Sheet C	1	2	3	4	5	6	7	8	9	10	Final
British Columbia (Parker)	0	0	2	1	1	0	3	0	0	X	7
Prince Edward Island (Large) 🔨	0	1	0	0	0	2	0	0	1	X	4

Sheet D	1	2	3	4	5	6	7	8	9	10	Final
Saskatchewan (Day)	2	1	0	1	0	0	0	1	0	3	8
Ontario (Thompson) 🔨	0	0	2	0	1	1	1	0	1	0	6

Sheet E	1	2	3	4	5	6	7	8	9	10	Final
Yukon/Northwest Territories (Felker)	0	1	0	1	0	1	1	0	X	X	4
Nova Scotia (Jones) 🔨	5	0	3	0	1	0	0	3	X	X	12

=== Draw 5 ===
Monday, March 1, 7:30 pm

Sheet A	1	2	3	4	5	6	7	8	9	10	Final
Prince Edward Island (Large)	0	0	0	0	1	1	X	X	X	X	2
Ontario (Thompson) 🔨	4	2	1	2	0	0	X	X	X	X	9

Sheet B	1	2	3	4	5	6	7	8	9	10	Final
Yukon/Northwest Territories (Felker) 🔨	2	0	0	1	0	0	1	0	0	X	4
Newfoundland (Quinn)	0	2	1	0	0	2	0	3	1	X	9

Sheet C	1	2	3	4	5	6	7	8	9	10	Final
Manitoba (Rose)🔨	1	0	2	0	1	0	1	0	0	X	5
Nova Scotia (Jones)	0	2	0	4	0	1	0	0	2	X	9

Sheet D	1	2	3	4	5	6	7	8	9	10	Final
New Brunswick (Ouellet)	2	0	0	0	1	0	2	0	1	X	6
Quebec (Tousignant) 🔨	0	0	2	0	0	1	0	0	0	X	3

Sheet E	1	2	3	4	5	6	7	8	9	10	Final
British Columbia (Parker) 🔨	2	0	0	2	1	0	0	1	1	X	7
Alberta (Shaw)	0	1	0	0	0	0	3	0	0	X	4

=== Draw 6 ===
Tuesday, March 2, 1:30 pm

Sheet A	1	2	3	4	5	6	7	8	9	10	Final
Nova Scotia (Jones)	3	2	0	0	0	3	1	0	X	X	9
Quebec (Tousignant) 🔨	0	0	1	1	1	0	0	1	X	X	4

Sheet B	1	2	3	4	5	6	7	8	9	10	Final
British Columbia (Parker)	1	1	0	1	0	5	0	4	X	X	12
Yukon/Northwest Territories (Felker) 🔨	0	0	1	0	2	0	3	0	X	X	6

Sheet C	1	2	3	4	5	6	7	8	9	10	11	12	Final
Ontario (Thompson)	0	2	0	1	0	4	1	0	0	1	0	0	9
Alberta (Shaw) 🔨	1	0	3	0	2	0	0	1	2	0	0	1	10

Sheet D	1	2	3	4	5	6	7	8	9	10	Final
Prince Edward Island (Large) 🔨	0	1	0	0	0	1	0	0	2	0	4
Saskatchewan (Day)	0	0	0	0	2	0	2	1	0	2	7

Sheet E	1	2	3	4	5	6	7	8	9	10	Final
Manitoba (Rose)🔨	0	0	1	0	1	0	2	0	X	X	4
Newfoundland (Quinn)	0	2	0	2	0	3	0	3	X	X	10

=== Draw 7 ===
Tuesday, March 2, 7:30 pm

Sheet A	1	2	3	4	5	6	7	8	9	10	Final
Alberta (Shaw)	0	2	1	1	0	0	0	2	0	1	7
Saskatchewan (Day) 🔨	1	0	0	0	4	0	0	0	0	0	5

Sheet B	1	2	3	4	5	6	7	8	9	10	Final
Manitoba (Rose) 🔨	2	0	2	2	0	1	4	0	X	X	11
British Columbia (Parker)	0	1	0	0	3	0	0	1	X	X	5

Sheet C	1	2	3	4	5	6	7	8	9	10	Final
Quebec (Tousignant)	0	1	0	2	0	1	0	0	2	X	6
Newfoundland (Quinn) 🔨	2	0	1	0	0	0	0	1	0	X	4

Sheet D	1	2	3	4	5	6	7	8	9	10	11	Final
Nova Scotia (Jones) 🔨	2	1	0	1	1	0	0	1	0	1	0	7
New Brunswick (Ouellet)	0	0	1	0	0	2	3	0	1	0	1	8

Sheet E	1	2	3	4	5	6	7	8	9	10	Final
Ontario (Thompson)🔨	0	0	2	0	1	0	0	0	X	X	3
Yukon/Northwest Territories (Felker)	3	1	0	3	0	1	2	1	X	X	11

=== Draw 8 ===
Wednesday, March 3, 1:30 pm

Sheet A	1	2	3	4	5	6	7	8	9	10	Final
Newfoundland (Quinn)	0	2	2	1	0	0	1	1	0	X	7
New Brunswick (Ouellet) 🔨	2	0	0	0	1	0	0	0	2	X	5

Sheet B	1	2	3	4	5	6	7	8	9	10	Final
Ontario (Thompson) 🔨	1	0	2	0	3	0	0	3	2	X	11
Manitoba (Rose)	0	1	0	1	0	1	1	0	0	X	4

Sheet C	1	2	3	4	5	6	7	8	9	10	Final
Saskatchewan (Day)	0	2	0	1	0	2	1	1	0	X	7
Yukon/Northwest Territories (Felker) 🔨	0	0	1	0	1	0	0	0	3	X	5

Sheet D	1	2	3	4	5	6	7	8	9	10	Final
Alberta (Shaw) 🔨	2	2	3	0	3	4	X	X	X	X	14
Prince Edward Island (Large)	0	0	0	1	0	0	X	X	X	X	1

Sheet E	1	2	3	4	5	6	7	8	9	10	Final
Quebec (Tousignant) 🔨	1	0	2	0	0	0	0	1	0	0	4
British Columbia (Parker)	0	1	0	0	2	1	1	0	0	1	6

=== Draw 9 ===
Wednesday, March 3, 7:30 pm

Sheet A	1	2	3	4	5	6	7	8	9	10	Final
Yukon/Northwest Territories (Felker)	0	2	0	2	0	0	0	2	0	X	6
Prince Edward Island (Large) 🔨	2	0	1	0	2	1	1	0	1	X	8

Sheet B	1	2	3	4	5	6	7	8	9	10	Final
Quebec (Tousignant) 🔨	2	0	2	0	1	1	0	1	0	X	7
Ontario (Thompson)	0	1	0	2	0	0	2	0	0	X	5

Sheet C	1	2	3	4	5	6	7	8	9	10	Final
New Brunswick (Ouellet)	0	2	0	1	0	2	0	0	2	X	7
British Columbia (Parker) 🔨	2	0	2	0	2	0	1	3	0	X	10

Sheet D	1	2	3	4	5	6	7	8	9	10	Final
Newfoundland (Quinn)	1	0	2	1	0	0	1	1	0	0	6
Nova Scotia (Jones) 🔨	0	3	0	0	0	1	0	0	2	1	7

Sheet E	1	2	3	4	5	6	7	8	9	10	Final
Saskatchewan (Day)	0	1	1	0	1	0	1	0	1	0	5
Manitoba (Rose) 🔨	1	0	0	1	0	1	0	2	0	1	6

=== Draw 10 ===
Thursday, March 4, 1:30 pm

Sheet A	1	2	3	4	5	6	7	8	9	10	Final
British Columbia (Parker)	0	0	1	0	0	0	1	1	1	X	4
Nova Scotia (Jones) 🔨	3	0	0	3	0	1	0	0	0	X	7

Sheet B	1	2	3	4	5	6	7	8	9	10	Final
Saskatchewan (Day) 🔨	2	1	1	0	0	1	3	0	2	X	10
Quebec (Tousignant)	0	0	0	2	2	0	0	2	0	X	6

Sheet C	1	2	3	4	5	6	7	8	9	10	Final
Prince Edward Island (Large)	0	1	0	1	0	1	X	X	X	X	3
Manitoba (Rose) 🔨	3	0	3	0	3	0	X	X	X	X	9

Sheet D	1	2	3	4	5	6	7	8	9	10	Final
Yukon/Northwest Territories (Felker) 🔨	0	1	0	0	0	1	1	1	0	X	4
Alberta (Shaw)	1	0	2	2	1	0	0	0	3	X	9

Sheet E	1	2	3	4	5	6	7	8	9	10	Final
New Brunswick (Ouellet)	0	1	0	0	1	0	1	0	1	0	4
Ontario (Thompson) 🔨	0	0	1	2	0	1	0	1	0	1	6

=== Draw 11 ===
Thursday, March 4, 7:30 pm

Sheet A	1	2	3	4	5	6	7	8	9	10	Final
Manitoba (Rose) 🔨	0	2	1	0	1	1	5	X	X	X	10
Alberta (Shaw)	1	0	0	1	0	0	0	X	X	X	2

Sheet B	1	2	3	4	5	6	7	8	9	10	Final
New Brunswick (Ouellet)	0	0	0	2	0	2	1	0	1	0	6
Saskatchewan (Day) 🔨	0	0	2	0	2	0	0	2	0	2	8

Sheet C	1	2	3	4	5	6	7	8	9	10	11	Final
Nova Scotia (Jones)	1	0	0	2	0	1	0	1	0	1	0	6
Ontario (Thompson) 🔨	0	0	2	0	1	0	1	0	2	0	1	7

Sheet D	1	2	3	4	5	6	7	8	9	10	Final
British Columbia (Parker) 🔨	0	1	0	0	1	0	2	0	2	1	7
Newfoundland (Quinn)	0	0	0	2	0	1	0	2	0	0	5

Sheet E	1	2	3	4	5	6	7	8	9	10	Final
Quebec (Tousignant)	0	0	0	3	1	2	0	0	0	X	6
Prince Edward Island (Large) 🔨	0	1	2	0	0	0	1	1	0	X	5

== Tiebreaker ==
Friday, March 5, 1:30 pm

Sheet C	1	2	3	4	5	6	7	8	9	10	11	Final
Alberta (Shaw)	0	0	2	0	0	0	0	2	0	1	0	5
Saskatchewan (Day)	0	0	0	2	1	0	0	0	2	0	2	7

Player percentages
Alberta		Saskatchewan	
Donna Martineau	74%	Dorothy Hepper	73%
Sandra Rippel	74%	Velva Squire	66%
Karen Jones	76%	Shirley McKendry	69%
Cathy Shaw	70%	Arleen Day	67%
Total	74%	Total	69%

== Playoffs ==
Semifinals
1	Nova Scotia	12
4	Saskatchewan	4
2	Manitoba	10
3	British Columbia	5

Final
1	Nova Scotia	8
2	Manitoba	7

=== Semifinals ===
Friday, March 5, 7:30 pm

Sheet B	1	2	3	4	5	6	7	8	9	10	Final
Manitoba (Rose) 🔨	1	2	0	2	0	2	3	0	X	X	10
British Columbia (Parker)	0	0	2	0	2	0	0	1	X	X	5

Player percentages
Manitoba		British Columbia	
Shannon Burns	69%	Sheila Mellis	82%
Kim Crass	76%	Donna Cunliffe	61%
Lynne Andrews	75%	Sharon Hastings	69%
Dorothy Rose	88%	Barbara Parker	59%
Total	76%	Total	68%

Sheet D	1	2	3	4	5	6	7	8	9	10	Final
Nova Scotia (Jones)	0	0	3	2	0	3	4	X	X	X	12
Saskatchewan (Day) 🔨	2	1	0	0	1	0	0	X	X	X	4

Player percentages
Nova Scotia		Saskatchewan	
Barb Jones-Gordon	79%	Dorothy Hepper	79%
Monica Jones	75%	Velva Squire	73%
Kay Smith	80%	Shirley McKendry	66%
Colleen Jones	79%	Arleen Day	50%
Total	78%	Total	67%

=== Final ===
Saturday, March 6, 12:30 pm

Sheet C	1	2	3	4	5	6	7	8	9	10	Final
Nova Scotia (Jones) 🔨	4	0	0	1	0	0	1	1	0	1	8
Manitoba (Rose)	0	3	1	0	2	0	0	0	1	0	7

Player percentages
Nova Scotia		Manitoba	
Barb Jones-Gordon	76%	Shannon Burns	76%
Monica Jones	85%	Kim Crass	76%
Kay Smith	73%	Lynne Andrews	60%
Colleen Jones	86%	Dorothy Rose	68%
Total	80%	Total	70%

== Statistics ==
=== Top 5 player percentages ===
Final Round Robin Percentages

Key
All-Star Team

Leads	%
(Nova Scotia) Barb Jones-Gordon	74
(Ontario) Wendy Inouye	69
(Saskatchewan) Dorothy Hepper	69
(British Columbia) Sheila Mellis	68
(Alberta) Donna Martineau	65

Seconds	%
(British Columbia) Donna Conliffe	73
(Nova Scotia) Monica Jones	71
(Saskatchewan) Velva Squire	70
(Ontario) Lindy Marchuk	65
(Alberta) Sandra Rippel	64

Thirds	%
(Manitoba) Lynne Andrews	72
(Ontario) Lynn Reynolds	68
(British Columbia) Sharon Hastings	67
(Alberta) Karen Jones	67
(Nova Scotia) Kay Smith	67

Skips	%
(Saskatchewan) Arleen Day	71
(Manitoba) Dorothy Rose	70
(Nova Scotia) Colleen Jones	70
(Ontario) Carol Thompson	69
(Newfoundland and Labrador) Lori Quinn	68

== Awards ==
The all-star team and sportsmanship award winners were as follows:

=== All-Star Team ===
Position	Name	Team
Skip	Arleen Day	Saskatchewan
Third	Lynne Andrews	Manitoba
Second	Donna Conliffe	British Columbia
Lead	Barb Jones-Gordon	Nova Scotia

=== Joyce McKee Award ===
The Scotties Tournament of Hearts Sportsmanship Award is presented to the curler who best embodies the spirit of curling at the Scotties Tournament of Hearts. The winner was selected in a vote by all players at the tournament.

Prior to 1998, the award was named after a notable individual in the curling community where the tournament was held that year. For this edition, the award was named after Joyce McKee, who won five championships, including the inaugural event in 1961.

Name	Team	Position
Carol Thompson	Ontario	Skip
