= Sandra Schmirler Most Valuable Player Award =

Award in the Scotties Tournament of Hearts

- Sport: Curling
- Competition: Scotties Tournament of Hearts
- Awarded for: Top player during the playoffs of the Scotties Tournament of Hearts.

History
- First award: 1997
- First winner: (Saskatchewan) Marcia Gudereit
- Most wins: (Manitoba) Kerri Einarson (4) (Ontario) Rachel Homan (4)
- Most recent: (Canada) Rachel Homan (4)

The Sandra Schmirler Most Valuable Player Award is awarded to the top player in the playoff round of the annual Scotties Tournament of Hearts. The winner is selected by members of the media, and is awarded at the victory banquet held after the final game of the bonspiel. The top player at the tournament has been recognized since 1997, when Marcia Gudereit won the award. After Sandra Schmirler's death at 36 due to cancer, the award was renamed starting in 2001. The current holder of the Schmirler Award is Rachel Homan of Team Canada.

Kerri Einarson and Rachel Homan have both won the Schmirler Award four times, tied for the most of any woman. Colleen Jones, Kelly Scott, Jennifer Jones, and Chelsea Carey are the only other women who have won the award more than once. Colleen Jones won all three of her MVP awards while playing as Team Canada. Scott won the award once while representing her home province of British Columbia and the next year playing as Team Canada as the reigning champion, while Jennifer Jones won it while representing Manitoba in 2015 and 2018, and representing Team Canada in 2009. Carey won both of her MVP awards while representing Alberta. Homan won her first MVP award after successfully defending her Scotties championship in 2014, then winning again representing Ontario in 2017 and 2024, as well as when she defended her title again in 2025. Einarson won her first MVP with her first Scotties title representing Manitoba in 2020, then defended both as Team Canada in 2021, 2022, and 2023.

== Past winners ==
Year	Player	Team	Position
1997	Marcia Gudereit	Saskatchewan	Lead
1998	Brenda Bohmer	Alberta	Second
1999	Kim Kelly	Nova Scotia	Third
2000	Julie Skinner	British Columbia	Third
2001	Nancy Delahunt	Nova Scotia	Lead
2002	Colleen Jones	Canada	Skip
2003	Colleen Jones	Canada	Skip
2004	Colleen Jones	Canada	Skip
2005	Jenn Hanna	Ontario	Skip
2006	Kelly Scott	British Columbia	Skip
2007	Kelly Scott	Canada	Skip
2008	Cathy Overton-Clapham	Manitoba	Third
2009	Jennifer Jones	Canada	Skip
2010	Erin Carmody	Prince Edward Island	Fourth
2011	Amber Holland	Saskatchewan	Skip
2012	Heather Nedohin	Alberta	Skip
2013	Lisa Weagle	Ontario	Lead
2014	Rachel Homan	Canada	Skip
2015	Jennifer Jones	Manitoba	Skip
2016	Chelsea Carey	Alberta	Skip
2017	Rachel Homan	Ontario	Skip
2018	Jennifer Jones	Manitoba	Skip
2019	Chelsea Carey	Alberta	Skip
2020	Kerri Einarson	Manitoba	Skip
2021	Kerri Einarson	Canada	Skip
2022	Kerri Einarson	Canada	Skip
2023	Kerri Einarson	Canada	Skip
2024	Rachel Homan	Ontario–Homan	Skip
2025	Rachel Homan	Canada	Skip
