= 2002 Scott Tournament of Hearts =

- Host city: Brandon, Manitoba
- Arena: Keystone Centre
- Dates: February 23 – March 3
- Attendance: 62,124
- Winner: Canada
- Curling club: Mayflower CC, Halifax
- Skip: Colleen Jones
- Third: Kim Kelly
- Second: Mary-Anne Waye
- Lead: Nancy Delahunt
- Alternate: Laine Peters
- Coach: Ken Bagnell
- Finalist: Saskatchewan (Sherry Anderson)

The 2002 Scott Tournament of Hearts Canadian women's national curling championship, was played at the Keystone Centre in Brandon, Manitoba. The defending champion, representing Team Canada, Colleen Jones and her rink from the Mayflower Curling Club in Halifax, Nova Scotia won her second straight Hearts.

== Teams ==
The teams were listed as follows:

Team Canada	Alberta	British Columbia
Mayflower CC, Halifax Skip: Colleen Jones; Third: Kim Kelly; Second: Mary-Anne Waye; Lead: Nancy Delahunt; Alternate: Laine Peters	Ottewell CC, Edmonton Skip: Cathy King; Third: Lawnie MacDonald; Second: Brenda Bohmer; Lead: Kate Horne; Alternate: Marcy Balderston	Richmond CC, Richmond Skip: Kristy Lewis; Third: Krista Bernard; Second: Denise Blashko; Lead: Susan Allen; Alternate: Carmen Blashko
Manitoba	New Brunswick	Newfoundland and Labrador
St. Vital CC, Winnipeg Skip: Jennifer Jones; Third: Karen Porritt; Second: Lynn Fallis-Kurz; Lead: Dana Allerton; Alternate: Jill Officer	Thistle St. Andrews CC, Saint John Skip: Kathy Floyd; Third: Marie-Anne Power; Second: Jane Arseneau (Note: For Draws 8, 9, 11-13, and 15, Team New Brunswick lead Allison Franey threw second stones while second Jane Arseneau threw lead stones.); Lead: Allison Franey; Alternate: Mary Harding	St. John's CC, St. John's Skip: Cathy Cunningham; Third: Peg Goss; Second: Kathy Kerr; Lead: Heather Martin (Note: Team Newfoundland and Labrador alternate Anna-Mae Holden threw lead stones in Draws 12 and 13.); Alternate: Anna-Mae Holden
Nova Scotia	Ontario	Prince Edward Island
Mayflower CC, Halifax Skip: Meredith Doyle; Third: Beth Iskiw; Second: Candice MacLean; Lead: Krista Trider; Alternate: Allyson Burgess	Coldwater & District CC, Coldwater Skip: Sherry Middaugh; Third: Janet Brown; Second: Andrea Lawes; Lead: Sheri Cordina; Alternate: Kirsten Harmark	Charlottetown CC, Charlottetown Skip: Kathy O'Rourke; Third: Julie Scales; Second: Lori Robinson; Lead: Bea Graham; Alternate: Kim Dolan
Quebec	Saskatchewan	Northwest Territories/Yukon
CC Riverbend, Alma Skip: Nathalie Gagnon; Third: Joelle Belley; Second: Sylvie Fortin; Lead: Julie Blackburn; Alternate: Candide Hebert	Delisle CC, Delisle Skip: Sherry Anderson; Third: Kim Hodson; Second: Sandra Mulroney; Lead: Donna Gignac; Alternate: Heather Walsh	Yellowknife CC, Yellowknife Skip: Monigue Gagnier; Third: Kelly Kaylo; Second: Sharon Cormier; Lead: Cheryl Burlington; Alternate: Kerry Koe

== Map of teams ==
Team Canada Provincial Winners

== Round Robin standings ==
Final round robin standings

Key
Teams to Playoffs

Locale	Skip	W	L	W–L	PF	PA	EW	EL	BE	SE	S%
Saskatchewan	Sherry Anderson	9	2	–	66	52	45	40	12	12	80%
Canada	Colleen Jones	8	3	2–0	80	66	51	41	6	15	85%
Manitoba	Jennifer Jones	8	3	1–1	92	55	54	36	2	24	81%
Ontario	Sherry Middaugh	8	3	0–2	74	60	51	41	7	15	83%
Alberta	Cathy King	6	5	1–0	73	61	42	42	5	8	83%
British Columbia	Kristy Lewis	6	5	0–1	60	71	39	49	3	6	74%
Nova Scotia	Meredith Doyle	5	6	–	65	71	46	46	7	11	78%
Quebec	Nathalie Gagnon	4	7	1–0	64	71	45	43	5	14	76%
Northwest Territories/Yukon	Monique Gagnier	4	7	0–1	61	77	42	49	4	8	78%
Newfoundland and Labrador	Cathy Cunningham	3	8	1–0	66	70	44	46	10	10	79%
Prince Edward Island	Kathy O'Rourke	3	8	0–1	53	83	39	47	9	10	72%
New Brunswick	Kathy Floyd	2	9	–	65	82	39	57	5	7	80%

== Round Robin results ==
All draw times are listed in Central Time (UTC−06:00).

=== Draw 1 ===
Saturday, February 23, 1:30 pm

Sheet A	1	2	3	4	5	6	7	8	9	10	Final
British Columbia (Lewis) 🔨	0	0	0	2	0	2	0	0	2	1	7
Canada (C. Jones)	0	1	1	0	2	0	0	1	0	0	5

Sheet B	1	2	3	4	5	6	7	8	9	10	Final
Ontario (Middaugh) 🔨	0	0	2	1	0	0	2	0	0	1	6
Alberta (King)	0	2	0	0	1	0	0	2	0	0	5

Sheet C	1	2	3	4	5	6	7	8	9	10	Final
Saskatchewan (Anderson) 🔨	1	0	0	0	2	1	1	0	0	X	5
Quebec (Gagnon)	0	0	0	1	0	0	0	1	1	X	3

Sheet D	1	2	3	4	5	6	7	8	9	10	Final
Prince Edward Island (O'Rourke) 🔨	0	0	0	3	0	0	1	0	0	X	4
Manitoba (J. Jones)	0	2	1	0	1	2	0	2	0	X	8

=== Draw 2 ===
Saturday, February 23, 6:00 pm

Sheet A	1	2	3	4	5	6	7	8	9	10	Final
Quebec (Gagnon) 🔨	0	1	0	0	0	1	0	1	0	X	3
Ontario (Middaugh)	1	0	1	1	1	0	2	0	2	X	8

Sheet B	1	2	3	4	5	6	7	8	9	10	Final
Northwest Territories/Yukon (Gagnier) 🔨	1	1	2	0	1	0	1	0	0	2	8
New Brunswick (Floyd)	0	0	0	2	0	1	0	1	1	0	5

Sheet C	1	2	3	4	5	6	7	8	9	10	Final
Newfoundland and Labrador (Cunningham) 🔨	0	0	0	1	1	0	2	0	2	0	6
Nova Scotia (Doyle)	1	0	1	0	0	2	0	2	0	1	7

Sheet D	1	2	3	4	5	6	7	8	9	10	Final
Saskatchewan (Anderson) 🔨	0	0	2	0	2	0	1	0	0	X	5
Alberta (King)	0	0	0	1	0	1	0	0	1	X	3

=== Draw 3 ===
Sunday, February 24, 9:00 am

Sheet B	1	2	3	4	5	6	7	8	9	10	Final
Manitoba (J. Jones) 🔨	3	2	1	2	2	1	X	X	X	X	11
British Columbia (Lewis)	0	0	0	0	0	0	X	X	X	X	0

Sheet C	1	2	3	4	5	6	7	8	9	10	Final
Prince Edward Island (O'Rourke) 🔨	0	1	0	1	0	2	0	0	X	X	4
Canada (C. Jones)	0	0	3	0	4	0	2	1	X	X	10

=== Draw 4 ===
Sunday, February 24, 1:30 pm

Sheet A	1	2	3	4	5	6	7	8	9	10	Final
New Brunswick (Floyd) 🔨	4	0	1	0	0	1	0	1	0	2	9
Newfoundland and Labrador (Cunningham)	0	1	0	2	2	0	1	0	1	0	7

Sheet B	1	2	3	4	5	6	7	8	9	10	Final
Alberta (King) 🔨	2	0	0	2	0	0	3	0	2	X	9
Quebec (Gagnon)	0	0	1	0	1	1	0	1	0	X	4

Sheet C	1	2	3	4	5	6	7	8	9	10	Final
Ontario (Middaugh) 🔨	0	1	0	0	2	0	0	2	0	X	5
Saskatchewan (Anderson)	0	0	1	3	0	2	1	0	1	X	8

Sheet D	1	2	3	4	5	6	7	8	9	10	Final
Northwest Territories/Yukon (Gagnier) 🔨	1	0	0	1	0	2	0	2	0	X	6
Nova Scotia (Doyle)	0	1	1	0	4	0	3	0	1	X	10

=== Draw 5 ===
Sunday, February 24, 6:30 pm

Sheet A	1	2	3	4	5	6	7	8	9	10	Final
Canada (C. Jones) 🔨	1	0	3	1	0	0	1	1	0	1	8
Manitoba (J. Jones)	0	3	0	0	1	1	0	0	2	0	7

Sheet B	1	2	3	4	5	6	7	8	9	10	Final
Newfoundland and Labrador (Cunningham) 🔨	0	1	0	2	0	2	0	1	0	0	6
Northwest Territories/Yukon (Gagnier)	0	0	2	0	0	0	3	0	2	0	7

Sheet C	1	2	3	4	5	6	7	8	9	10	Final
Nova Scotia (Doyle) 🔨	0	0	1	1	0	1	1	0	3	X	7
New Brunswick (Floyd)	0	1	0	0	1	0	0	2	0	X	4

Sheet D	1	2	3	4	5	6	7	8	9	10	11	Final
British Columbia (Lewis) 🔨	1	0	0	0	2	0	2	0	0	0	2	7
Prince Edward Island (O'Rourke)	0	1	1	1	0	1	0	1	0	0	0	5

=== Draw 6 ===
Monday, February 25, 9:00 am

Sheet A	1	2	3	4	5	6	7	8	9	10	Final
Prince Edward Island (O'Rourke) 🔨	0	1	0	0	2	1	0	1	2	X	7
Saskatchewan (Anderson)	2	0	0	1	0	0	1	0	0	X	4

Sheet B	1	2	3	4	5	6	7	8	9	10	Final
Manitoba (J. Jones) 🔨	1	0	2	1	0	0	1	0	4	X	9
Ontario (Middaugh)	0	1	0	0	1	1	0	1	0	X	4

Sheet C	1	2	3	4	5	6	7	8	9	10	Final
British Columbia (Lewis) 🔨	1	0	3	0	1	0	2	0	2	1	10
Quebec (Gagnon)	0	2	0	1	0	2	0	2	0	0	7

Sheet D	1	2	3	4	5	6	7	8	9	10	Final
Canada (C. Jones) 🔨	0	0	1	0	0	0	1	2	0	2	6
Alberta (King)	0	0	0	0	0	2	0	0	3	0	5

=== Draw 7 ===
Monday, February 25, 1:30 pm

Sheet A	1	2	3	4	5	6	7	8	9	10	Final
Ontario (Middaugh) 🔨	2	1	0	1	0	1	0	1	0	1	7
Nova Scotia (Doyle)	0	0	1	0	1	0	1	0	1	0	4

Sheet B	1	2	3	4	5	6	7	8	9	10	Final
Saskatchewan (Anderson) 🔨	0	0	0	2	0	2	0	1	2	X	7
New Brunswick (Floyd)	0	0	0	0	1	0	3	0	0	X	4

Sheet C	1	2	3	4	5	6	7	8	9	10	Final
Alberta (King) 🔨	0	0	2	0	1	0	3	0	1	0	7
Newfoundland and Labrador (Cunningham)	1	0	0	1	0	1	0	3	0	2	8

Sheet D	1	2	3	4	5	6	7	8	9	10	Final
Quebec (Gagnon) 🔨	1	2	1	0	1	1	1	0	X	X	7
Northwest Territories/Yukon (Gagnier)	0	0	0	1	0	0	0	1	X	X	2

=== Draw 8 ===
Monday, February 25, 6:30 pm

Sheet A	1	2	3	4	5	6	7	8	9	10	Final
Northwest Territories/Yukon (Gagnier) 🔨	0	1	0	3	0	1	0	1	1	X	7
British Columbia (Lewis)	0	0	1	0	1	0	1	0	0	X	3

Sheet B	1	2	3	4	5	6	7	8	9	10	Final
Newfoundland and Labrador (Cunningham) 🔨	2	0	0	0	0	1	0	2	0	0	5
Canada (C. Jones)	0	2	0	0	0	0	1	0	2	1	6

Sheet C	1	2	3	4	5	6	7	8	9	10	11	Final
New Brunswick (Floyd) 🔨	0	0	0	2	0	0	2	0	3	1	0	8
Prince Edward Island (O'Rourke)	1	0	1	0	0	5	0	1	0	0	1	9

Sheet D	1	2	3	4	5	6	7	8	9	10	Final
Nova Scotia (Doyle) 🔨	3	0	2	0	1	0	0	0	1	0	7
Manitoba (J. Jones)	0	2	0	2	0	1	1	1	0	1	8

=== Draw 9 ===
Tuesday, February 26, 9:00 am

Sheet A	1	2	3	4	5	6	7	8	9	10	11	Final
New Brunswick (Floyd) 🔨	1	0	2	0	0	2	0	0	0	2	0	7
Canada (C. Jones)	0	1	0	2	1	0	1	1	1	0	1	8

Sheet B	1	2	3	4	5	6	7	8	9	10	Final
Nova Scotia (Doyle) 🔨	0	0	1	0	1	1	0	1	1	0	5
British Columbia (Lewis)	0	0	0	1	0	0	2	0	0	3	6

Sheet C	1	2	3	4	5	6	7	8	9	10	Final
Northwest Territories/Yukon (Gagnier) 🔨	2	0	0	1	0	0	1	0	0	X	4
Manitoba (J. Jones)	0	1	1	0	1	3	0	0	4	X	10

Sheet D	1	2	3	4	5	6	7	8	9	10	Final
Newfoundland and Labrador (Cunningham) 🔨	2	0	0	2	1	3	1	X	X	X	9
Prince Edward Island (O'Rourke)	0	1	1	0	0	0	0	X	X	X	2

=== Draw 10 ===
Tuesday, February 26, 1:30 pm

Sheet A	1	2	3	4	5	6	7	8	9	10	Final
Manitoba (J. Jones) 🔨	2	3	3	0	1	0	2	X	X	X	11
Alberta (King)	0	0	0	2	0	2	0	X	X	X	4

Sheet B	1	2	3	4	5	6	7	8	9	10	Final
Prince Edward Island (O'Rourke) 🔨	0	2	0	1	0	0	0	3	0	1	7
Quebec (Gagnon)	0	0	1	0	1	1	2	0	1	0	6

Sheet C	1	2	3	4	5	6	7	8	9	10	Final
Canada (C. Jones) 🔨	0	2	0	0	2	0	1	0	2	1	8
Ontario (Middaugh)	1	0	1	0	0	2	0	1	0	0	5

Sheet D	1	2	3	4	5	6	7	8	9	10	Final
British Columbia (Lewis) 🔨	1	0	0	0	1	0	1	0	0	X	3
Saskatchewan (Anderson)	0	0	2	1	0	1	0	1	1	X	6

=== Draw 11 ===
Tuesday, February 26, 6:30 pm

Sheet A	1	2	3	4	5	6	7	8	9	10	Final
Quebec (Gagnon) 🔨	1	0	0	1	2	0	2	1	0	1	8
Newfoundland and Labrador (Cunningham)	0	1	1	0	0	3	0	0	1	0	6

Sheet B	1	2	3	4	5	6	7	8	9	10	Final
Alberta (King) 🔨	2	0	2	2	0	1	0	1	1	X	9
Northwest Territories/Yukon (Gagnier)	0	1	0	0	1	0	3	0	0	X	5

Sheet C	1	2	3	4	5	6	7	8	9	10	11	Final
Saskatchewan (Anderson) 🔨	0	1	0	2	0	0	0	1	0	0	1	5
Nova Scotia (Doyle)	0	0	1	0	0	1	0	0	1	1	0	4

Sheet D	1	2	3	4	5	6	7	8	9	10	Final
Ontario (Middaugh) 🔨	1	1	1	3	0	2	0	1	0	X	9
New Brunswick (Floyd)	0	0	0	0	2	0	3	0	1	X	6

=== Draw 12 ===
Wednesday, February 27, 9:00 am

Sheet A	1	2	3	4	5	6	7	8	9	10	Final
Saskatchewan (Anderson) 🔨	0	1	1	0	0	1	0	3	0	0	6
Northwest Territories/Yukon (Gagnier)	0	0	0	0	1	0	1	0	1	2	5

Sheet B	1	2	3	4	5	6	7	8	9	10	Final
Ontario (Middaugh) 🔨	0	1	0	2	1	0	2	0	1	X	7
Newfoundland and Labrador (Cunningham)	0	0	2	0	0	1	0	2	0	X	5

Sheet C	1	2	3	4	5	6	7	8	9	10	Final
Quebec (Gagnon) 🔨	0	1	0	1	0	1	0	1	1	3	8
New Brunswick (Floyd)	0	0	1	0	3	0	1	0	0	0	5

Sheet D	1	2	3	4	5	6	7	8	9	10	Final
Alberta (King) 🔨	1	2	0	0	2	0	1	0	0	X	6
Nova Scotia (Doyle)	0	0	0	1	0	1	0	1	1	X	4

=== Draw 13 ===
Wednesday, February 27, 1:30 pm

Sheet A	1	2	3	4	5	6	7	8	9	10	Final
Nova Scotia (Doyle) 🔨	3	2	0	0	0	0	0	2	0	0	7
Prince Edward Island (O'Rourke)	0	0	0	0	2	1	0	0	2	1	6

Sheet B	1	2	3	4	5	6	7	8	9	10	Final
New Brunswick (Floyd) 🔨	0	1	3	2	0	0	0	2	1	X	9
Manitoba (J. Jones)	2	0	0	0	1	1	2	0	0	X	6

Sheet C	1	2	3	4	5	6	7	8	9	10	Final
Newfoundland and Labrador (Cunningham) 🔨	0	0	1	0	1	2	0	1	0	0	5
British Columbia (Lewis)	0	0	0	2	0	0	2	0	1	1	6

Sheet D	1	2	3	4	5	6	7	8	9	10	Final
Northwest Territories/Yukon (Gagnier) 🔨	0	1	0	0	2	0	0	2	1	X	6
Canada (C. Jones)	0	0	4	1	0	2	1	0	0	X	8

=== Draw 14 ===
Wednesday, February 27, 6:30 pm

Sheet A	1	2	3	4	5	6	7	8	9	10	Final
British Columbia (Lewis) 🔨	1	0	0	2	1	0	2	0	0	0	6
Ontario (Middaugh)	0	2	2	0	0	2	0	0	0	1	7

Sheet B	1	2	3	4	5	6	7	8	9	10	Final
Canada (C. Jones) 🔨	1	0	0	2	0	0	2	0	2	0	7
Saskatchewan (Anderson)	0	2	1	0	1	0	0	2	0	2	8

Sheet C	1	2	3	4	5	6	7	8	9	10	Final
Prince Edward Island (O'Rourke) 🔨	0	1	0	1	0	0	0	X	X	X	2
Alberta (King)	0	0	3	0	3	2	1	X	X	X	9

Sheet D	1	2	3	4	5	6	7	8	9	10	Final
Manitoba (J. Jones) 🔨	3	1	3	0	2	0	X	X	X	X	9
Quebec (Gagnon)	0	0	0	2	0	1	X	X	X	X	3

=== Draw 15 ===
Thursday, February 28, 9:00 am

Sheet A	1	2	3	4	5	6	7	8	9	10	Final
Alberta (King) 🔨	0	2	1	0	0	1	0	2	0	1	7
New Brunswick (Floyd)	0	0	0	1	1	0	1	0	1	0	4

Sheet B	1	2	3	4	5	6	7	8	9	10	Final
Quebec (Gagnon) 🔨	3	0	0	4	2	2	X	X	X	X	11
Nova Scotia (Doyle)	0	0	2	0	0	0	X	X	X	X	2

Sheet C	1	2	3	4	5	6	7	8	9	10	Final
Ontario (Middaugh) 🔨	2	0	2	2	0	0	3	X	X	X	9
Northwest Territories/Yukon (Gagnier)	0	1	0	0	1	1	0	X	X	X	3

Sheet D	1	2	3	4	5	6	7	8	9	10	Final
Saskatchewan (Anderson) 🔨	0	2	2	0	1	0	0	0	1	X	6
Newfoundland and Labrador (Cunningham)	0	0	0	1	0	1	0	1	0	X	3

=== Draw 16 ===
Thursday, February 28, 1:30 pm

Sheet A	1	2	3	4	5	6	7	8	9	10	11	Final
Newfoundland and Labrador (Cunningham) 🔨	0	1	0	0	1	0	0	3	0	0	1	6
Manitoba (J. Jones)	1	0	1	0	0	2	0	0	0	1	0	5

Sheet B	1	2	3	4	5	6	7	8	9	10	Final
Northwest Territories/Yukon (Gagnier) 🔨	2	1	0	3	0	1	0	0	1	X	8
Prince Edward Island (O'Rourke)	0	0	1	0	1	0	1	1	0	X	4

Sheet C	1	2	3	4	5	6	7	8	9	10	Final
Nova Scotia (Doyle) 🔨	1	0	2	0	1	0	2	0	1	1	8
Canada (C. Jones)	0	2	0	1	0	2	0	1	0	0	6

Sheet D	1	2	3	4	5	6	7	8	9	10	Final
New Brunswick (Floyd) 🔨	3	0	0	0	0	0	0	1	0	0	4
British Columbia (Lewis)	0	2	0	0	1	0	0	0	2	1	6

=== Draw 17 ===
Thursday, February 28, 6:30 pm

Sheet A	1	2	3	4	5	6	7	8	9	10	Final
Canada (C. Jones) 🔨	0	2	0	2	0	1	1	0	2	X	8
Quebec (Gagnon)	0	0	1	0	3	0	0	0	0	X	4

Sheet B	1	2	3	4	5	6	7	8	9	10	Final
British Columbia (Lewis) 🔨	2	0	2	0	1	0	1	0	0	X	6
Alberta (King)	0	1	0	2	0	1	0	4	1	X	9

Sheet C	1	2	3	4	5	6	7	8	9	10	Final
Manitoba (J. Jones) 🔨	0	2	1	1	0	1	0	2	0	1	8
Saskatchewan (Anderson)	1	0	0	0	1	0	3	0	1	0	6

Sheet D	1	2	3	4	5	6	7	8	9	10	Final
Prince Edward Island (O'Rourke) 🔨	0	0	1	0	1	0	0	1	0	X	3
Ontario (Middaugh)	0	2	0	1	0	2	1	0	1	X	7

== Playoffs ==
Page playoff system
1	Saskatchewan	6
2	Canada	3
3	Manitoba	6
4	Ontario	7

Semifinal
2	Canada	8
4	Ontario	6

Final
1	Saskatchewan	5
2	Canada	8

=== 3 vs. 4 ===
Friday, March 1, 1:30 pm

Sheet C	1	2	3	4	5	6	7	8	9	10	Final
Manitoba (J. Jones) 🔨	2	0	1	0	1	0	2	0	0	0	6
Ontario (Middaugh)	0	2	0	1	0	2	0	0	1	1	7

Player percentages
Manitoba		Ontario	
Dana Allerton	68%	Sheri Cordina	89%
Lynn Fallis-Kurz	79%	Andrea Lawes	80%
Karen Porritt	86%	Janet Brown	71%
Jennifer Jones	80%	Sherry Middaugh	86%
Total	78%	Total	82%

=== 1 vs. 2 ===
Friday, March 1, 6:30 pm

Team	1	2	3	4	5	6	7	8	9	10	Final
Saskatchewan (Anderson) 🔨	2	0	1	0	0	0	3	0	0	X	6
Canada (C. Jones)	0	1	0	1	0	0	0	0	1	X	3

Player percentages
Saskatchewan		Canada	
Donna Gignac	72%	Nancy Delahunt	93%
Sandra Mulroney	81%	Mary-Anne Waye	85%
Kim Hodson	94%	Kim Kelly	81%
Sherry Anderson	95%	Colleen Jones	68%
Total	86%	Total	82%

=== Semifinal ===
Saturday, March 2, 6:00 pm

Team	1	2	3	4	5	6	7	8	9	10	Final
Canada (C. Jones) 🔨	2	0	0	0	1	0	3	1	0	1	8
Ontario (Middaugh)	0	1	0	3	0	1	0	0	1	0	6

Player percentages
Canada		Ontario	
Nancy Delahunt	93%	Sheri Cordina	95%
Mary-Anne Waye	88%	Andrea Lawes	90%
Kim Kelly	88%	Janet Brown	76%
Colleen Jones	87%	Sherry Middaugh	79%
Total	89%	Total	85%

=== Final ===
Sunday, March 3, 12:00 pm

Team	1	2	3	4	5	6	7	8	9	10	Final
Saskatchewan (Anderson) 🔨	1	0	0	1	0	0	1	0	2	X	5
Canada (C. Jones)	0	1	1	0	1	3	0	2	0	X	8

Player percentages
Saskatchewan		Canada	
Donna Gignac	86%	Nancy Delahunt	79%
Sandra Mulroney	76%	Mary-Anne Waye	81%
Kim Hodson	86%	Kim Kelly	86%
Sherry Anderson	69%	Colleen Jones	99%
Total	80%	Total	86%

== Statistics ==
=== Top 5 Player Percentages ===
Round robin only; minimum 6 games

Key
First All-Star Team
Second All-Star Team

Leads	%
(Canada) Nancy Delahunt	91
(Newfoundland and Labrador) Heather Martin	86
(New Brunswick) Allison Franey (Note: Franey's percentage includes games where she threw second stones.)	86
(Alberta) Kate Horne	85
(Ontario) Sheri Cordina	85

Seconds	%
(Canada) Mary-Anne Waye	87
(Manitoba) Lynn Fallis-Kurz	82
(Newfoundland and Labrador) Kathy Kerr	82
(Alberta) Brenda Bohmer	82
(Ontario) Andrea Lawes	81
(New Brunswick) Jane Arseneau (Note: Arseneau's percentage includes games where she threw lead stones.)	81

Thirds	%
(Alberta) Lawnie MacDonald	85
(Ontario) Janet Brown	84
(Saskatchewan) Kim Hodson	82
(Northwest Territories) Kelly Kaylo	82
(Manitoba) Karen Porritt	81

Skips	%
(Ontario) Sherry Middaugh	82
(Saskatchewan) Sherry Anderson	82
(Alberta) Cathy King	81
(Canada) Colleen Jones	81
(Manitoba) Jennifer Jones	79

=== Perfect games ===
Round robin only; minimum 10 shots thrown

Player	Team	Position	Shots	Opponent
Lynn Fallis-Kurz	Manitoba	Second	14	Alberta

== Awards ==
=== All-Star teams ===
First Team
Position	Name	Team
Skip	Sherry Anderson	Saskatchewan
Third	Janet Brown	Ontario
Second	Mary-Anne Waye	Canada
Lead	Nancy Delahunt	Canada

Second Team
Position	Name	Team
Skip	Sherry Middaugh	Ontario
Third	Lawnie MacDonald	Alberta
Second	Lynn Fallis-Kurz	Manitoba
Lead	Allison Franey	New Brunswick

=== Marj Mitchell Sportsmanship Award ===
The Marj Mitchell Sportsmanship Award was presented to the player chosen by their fellow peers as the curler that most exemplified sportsmanship and dedication to curling during the annual Scotties Tournament of Hearts.

Name	Position	Team
Meredith Doyle	Skip	Nova Scotia

=== Sandra Schmirler Most Valuable Player Award ===
The Sandra Schmirler Most Valuable Player Award was awarded to the top player in the playoff round by members of the media in the Scotties Tournament of Hearts.

Name	Position	Team
Colleen Jones	Skip	Canada

=== Joan Mead Builder Award ===
The Joan Mead Builder Award recognizes a builder in the sport of curling named in the honour of the late CBC curling producer Joan Mead.

Name	Contribution(s)
Warren Hansen	Manager, Event Operations and Media, Canadian Curling Association

=== Ford Hot Shots ===
The Ford Hot Shots was a skills competition preceding the round robin of the tournament. Each competitor had to perform a series of shots with each shot scoring between 0 and 5 points depending on where the stone came to rest. The winner of this edition of the event would win a two-year lease on a Ford Focus SE Wagon.

Winner	Runner-Up	Score
(British Columbia) Kristy Lewis	(Manitoba) Jennifer Jones	15–8

=== Shot of the Week Award ===
The Shot of the Week Award was awarded to the curler who had been determined with the most outstanding shot during the tournament as voted on by TSN commentators.

Name	Position	Team
Sherry Anderson	Skip	Saskatchewan
