= Kate Horne =

Canadian curler

- Curler
- Born: August 23, 1954 (age 72); Revelstoke, British Columbia, Canada

Team
- Curling club: Ottewell CC, Edmonton, Avonair CC, Edmonton, Saville SC, Edmonton, Salmon Arm CC, Salmon Arm

Curling career
- Member Association: Alberta (1994-2009); British Columbia (2012-present)
- Hearts: 6 (1995, 1997, 1998, 1999, 2002, 2003)
- World Championship: 1 (1998)
Medal record
Curling
World Championships
Bronze medal – third place	1998 Kamloops
Scotties Tournament of Hearts
Gold medal – first place	1998 Regina
Silver medal – second place	1995 Calgary
Silver medal – second place	1999 Charlottetown

Kate Horne (born August 23, 1954 in Revelstoke, British Columbia, Canada) is a Canadian curler.

She is a 1998 World women's bronze medallist and 1998 Canadian women's champion.

== Teams and events ==
=== Women's ===
Season	Skip	Third	Second	Lead	Alternate	Coach	Events
1994–95	Cathy Borst	Maureen Brown	Deanne Shields	Kate Horne	LaDawn Funk		STOH 1995 (silver)
1996–97	Cathy Borst	Heather Godberson	Brenda Bohmer	Kate Horne	Lauren Rouse	Darryl Horne	STOH 1997 (4th)
1997–98	Cathy Borst	Heather Godberson	Brenda Bohmer	Kate Horne	Rona McGregor	Darryl Horne	COCT 1997 (5th); STOH 1998 (gold); WCC 1998 (bronze)
1998–99	Cathy Borst	Heather Godberson	Brenda Bohmer	Kate Horne	Rona McGregor		STOH 1999 (silver)
2001–02	Cathy King	Lawnie MacDonald	Brenda Bohmer	Kate Horne	Marcy Balderston	Darryl Horne	COCT 2001 (8th); STOH 2002 (5th)
2002–03	Deb Santos	Jackie-Rae Greening	Brenda Bohmer	Kate Horne	Shannon Orsini	Darryl Horne	STOH 2003 (6th)
2004–05	Deb Santos	Jackie-Rae Greening	Brenda Bohmer	Kate Horne			
2005–06	Deb Santos	Heather Nedohin	Brenda Bohmer	Kate Horne			
2006–07	Heather Nedohin (fourth)	Deb Santos (skip)	Kristie Moore	Kate Horne			CC 2007 (7th)
2007–08	Joanne Delanoy	Carolyn Morris	Melanie Swabb	Kate Horne			
2008–09	Brandee Borne	Nicky Kaufman	Tana Martin	Kate Horne			AB STOH 2009
2012–13	Penny Shantz	Sandra Jenkins	Kate Horne	Sherry Heath			
2013–14	Penny Shantz	Sandra Jenkins	Debbie Pulak	Kate Horne			CSCC 2014 (7th)
2014–15	Sandra Jenkins	Penny Shantz	Colleen Robson	Kate Horne			
2014–15	Sandra Jenkins	Kate Horne	Wendy Cseke	Carol Murray			CSCC 2015 (bronze)
2017–18	Sandra Jenkins	Kate Horne	Wendy Cseke	Carol Murray			
2018–19	Sandra Jenkins	Penny Shantz	Colleen Robson	Kate Horne			

=== Mixed ===
Season	Skip	Third	Second	Lead	Events
2006–07	Ted Appelman	Heather Nedohin	David Harper	Kate Horne	CMxCC 2007 (4th)

== Private life ==
Kate Horne married with Canadian curler and coach Darryl Horne, who coached Cathy Borst team to bronze at the 1998 World Women's Curling Championship and Alberta's Heather Nedohin team to bronze at the 2012 World Women's Curling Championship. She is the past winner of the B.C. Nisei bonspiel, for curlers of Japanese descent.
