= Rona McGregor =

Canadian curler

- Curler

Team
- Curling club: Ottewell CC, Edmonton

Curling career
- Member Association: Alberta
- Hearts: 3 (1998, 1999, 2000)
- World Championship: 1 (1998)
- Other appearances: World Junior Championships: 1 (1996)
Medal record
Curling
World Championships
Bronze medal – third place	1998 Kamloops
Scotties Tournament of Hearts
Gold medal – first place	1998 Regina
Silver medal – second place	1999 Charlottetown
World Junior Championships
Gold medal – first place	1996 Red Deer

Rona McGregor is a Canadian curler.

She is a 1998 World women's bronze medallist and 1998 Canadian women's champion.

== Teams and events ==
Season	Skip	Third	Second	Lead	Alternate	Coach	Events
1995–96	Heather Godberson	Carmen Whyte	Kristie Moore	Terelyn Bloor	Rona McGregor		WJCC 1996 (gold)
1997–98	Cathy Borst	Heather Godberson	Brenda Bohmer	Kate Horne	Rona McGregor	Darryl Horne	STOH 1998 (gold); WCC 1998 (bronze)
1998–99	Cathy Borst	Heather Godberson	Brenda Bohmer	Kate Horne	Rona McGregor		STOH 1999 (silver)
1999–00	Heather Nedohin	Carmen Barrack	Kristie Moore	Rona McGregor	Chantel Davison	Brian Moore	STOH 2000 (silver)
2000–01	Heather Nedohin	Carmen Barrack	Kristie Moore	Rona McGregor			
2001–02	Heather Nedohin	Carmen Barrack	Kristie Moore	Rona McGregor			
