= Joan McCusker =

Canadian curler (born 1965)

- Curler
- Born: Joan Elizabeth Inglis; June 8, 1965 (age 61); Yorkton, Saskatchewan, Canada

Curling career
- World Championship: 3 (1993, 1994, 1997)
- Olympic: 1 (1998)
Medal record
Women's curling
Representing Canada
Winter Olympics
Gold medal – first place	1998 Nagano	Team
World championships
Gold medal – first place	1993 Geneva	Team
Gold medal – first place	1994 Oberstdorf	Team
Gold medal – first place	1997 Berne	Team
Representing Saskatchewan
Scotties Tournament of Hearts
Gold medal – first place	1993 Brandon
Gold medal – first place	1994 Kitchener
Gold medal – first place	1997 Vancouver
Bronze medal – third place	1995 Calgary
Bronze medal – third place	1998 Regina
Canadian Olympic Curling Trials
Gold medal – first place	1997 Brandon

Joan McCusker (born Joan Elizabeth Inglis; June 8, 1965) is a Canadian Olympic gold medallist curler and broadcaster.

== Career ==
McCusker's greatest successes in curling came during the years she played second on the team of Sandra Schmirler (skip), Jan Betker (third), and Marcia Gudereit (lead). In 1993, 1994 and 1997, they won the Scott Tournament of Hearts, the Canadian women's championship, the first Canadian women's team to win multiple times with the same lineup. As the Tournament of Hearts champions McCusker's team went on to represent Canada at the World Curling Championships three times and won each time. At the 1998 Winter Olympics McCusker and the rest of the Schmirler rink represented Canada, defeating Denmark to win the gold medal. The success of the team of Schmirler, McCusker, Betker, and Gudereit came to an abrupt end in 2000 when Schmirler died of cancer.

In 2000, McCusker and her teammates were inducted into the Canada's Sports Hall of Fame. In 2019, McCusker and her Olympic teammates were named the greatest female Canadian curling team of all time as part of a TSN poll of broadcasters, reporters and top curlers.

== Personal life ==
Born on June 8, 1965, in Yorkton, McCusker grew up with her 6 siblings on a farm near Saltcoats, Saskatchewan. She comes from a family of curlers and her sisters Cathy Trowell, Karen Inglis and Nancy Inglis have also curled competitively at the provincial and national levels. Her husband Brian is also a curler and is a three time Saskatchewan champion. Joan and Brian have three children.

McCusker was an elementary school teacher until 1998, when she quit to focus on her curling and broadcasting career. From 2001 to 2024, McCusker had been part of CBC's curling coverage and then Sportsnet's coverage, working with Rob Faulds, Bruce Rainnie and Mike Harris. She also is a motivational speaker.

She currently coaches the Casey Scheidegger rink.

Preceded by Don Duguid	CBC Sports Lead Curling analyst (with Mike Harris); 2001-c. 2020	Succeeded by –
