= Brenda Bohmer =

Canadian curler

- Curler
- Born: March 30, 1957 (age 69); Camrose, Alberta, Canada

Team
- Curling club: Ottewell CC, Edmonton, Avonair CC, Edmonton

Curling career
- Member Association: Alberta
- Hearts: 5 (1997, 1998, 1999, 2002, 2003)
- World Championship: 1 (1998)
Medal record
Curling
World Championships
Bronze medal – third place	1998 Kamloops
Scotties Tournament of Hearts
Gold medal – first place	1998 Regina
Silver medal – second place	1999 Charlottetown

Brenda Lea Bohmer (born March 30, 1957, in Camrose, Alberta, Canada) is a Canadian curler.

She is a 1998 World women's bronze medallist.

== Awards ==
- Sandra Schmirler Most Valuable Player Award: 1998

== Teams and events ==
Season	Skip	Third	Second	Lead	Alternate	Coach	Events
1987–88	Lil Werenka	Simone Handfield	Bev Karasek	Kathy Bacon	Brenda Bohmer-Cassidy		STOH 1988 (9th)
1996–97	Cathy Borst	Heather Godberson	Brenda Bohmer	Kate Horne	Lauren Rouse	Darryl Horne	STOH 1997 (4th)
1997–98	Cathy Borst	Heather Godberson	Brenda Bohmer	Kate Horne	Rona McGregor	Darryl Horne	COCT 1997 (5th); STOH 1998 (gold); WCC 1998 (bronze)
1998–99	Cathy Borst	Heather Godberson	Brenda Bohmer	Kate Horne	Rona McGregor		STOH 1999 (silver)
2001–02	Cathy King	Lawnie MacDonald	Brenda Bohmer	Kate Horne	Marcy Balderston	Darryl Horne	COCT 2001 (8th); STOH 2002 (5th)
2002–03	Deb Santos	Jackie-Rae Greening	Brenda Bohmer	Kate Horne	Shannon Orsini	Darryl Horne	STOH 2003 (6th)
2004–05	Deb Santos	Jackie-Rae Greening	Brenda Bohmer	Kate Horne			
2005–06	Deb Santos	Heather Nedohin	Brenda Bohmer	Kate Horne			
