= 1995 Scott Tournament of Hearts =

Canadian women's curling championship

- Host city: Calgary, Alberta
- Arena: Max Bell Centre
- Dates: February 18–26
- Attendance: 52,202
- Winner: Manitoba
- Curling club: Fort Rouge CC, Winnipeg
- Skip: Connie Laliberte
- Third: Cathy Overton
- Second: Cathy Gauthier
- Lead: Janet Arnott
- Alternate: Debbie Jones-Walker
- Finalist: Alberta (Cathy Borst)

The 1995 Scott Tournament of Hearts, the Canadian women's national curling championship, was held from February 18 to 26, 1995 at the Max Bell Centre in Calgary, Alberta. The total attendance for the week was 52,202. It was the first time the Page playoff system would be used at the Tournament of Hearts.

Team Manitoba, who was skipped by Connie Laliberte won the event after defeating Alberta in the final 6–5. This was Manitoba's fifth title overall and the third skipped by Laliberte, who previously won in 1984 and 1992. At the time, Laliberte joined Vera Pezer as the only skips to have won the event three times. With the win, Team Laliberte went on to represent Canada at the 1995 World Women's Curling Championship.

After winning the Manitoba Hearts, Laliberte's third Karen Purdy broke her ankle after a fall, forcing the team to replace her with Cathy Overton-Clapham for the national championship.

In the final, Alberta had a 3–2 lead after five ends, but Manitoba capitalized in the sixth end on a mistake by Alberta skip Cathy Borst when she wrecked on a guard with her last rock. Laliberte drew for two to take the lead. The teams traded singles over the next three ends, making the teams tied 5–5 heading into the last end, with Manitoba having the hammer. Manitoba struggled in the 10th end, with lead Janet Arnott missing a peel, and second Cathy Gauthier flashing on a hit. On her final shot of the end, Borst partially buried her stone in the four-foot. Laliberte replied by chipping out the Manitoba rock, hanging around in the 12-foot for the winning point.

== Teams ==
The teams were listed as follows:

Team Canada	Alberta	British Columbia	Manitoba
Caledonian CC, Regina Skip: Sandra Peterson; Third: Jan Betker; Second: Joan McCusker; Lead: Marcia Gudereit; Alternate: Anita Ford	Ottewell CC, Edmonton Skip: Cathy Borst; Third: Maureen Brown; Second: Deanne Shields (Note: For Draws 1 and 2, Team Alberta alternate LaDawn Funk threw second stones while second Deanne Shields was attending her brother's wedding.); Lead: Kate Horne; Alternate: LaDawn Funk	Richmond WC, Richmond Skip: Marla Geiger; Third: Kelley Owen; Second: Sherry Fraser; Lead: Christine Jurgenson; Alternate: Cindy McArdle	Fort Rouge CC, Winnipeg Skip: Connie Laliberte; Third: Cathy Overton; Second: Cathy Gauthier; Lead: Janet Arnott; Alternate: Debbie Jones-Walker
New Brunswick	Newfoundland	Nova Scotia	Ontario
Thistle St. Andrews CC, Saint John Skip: Heidi Hanlon; Third: Kathy Floyd; Second: Nancy McConnery; Lead: Jane Arseneau; Alternate: Mary Harding	St. John's CC, St. John's Skip: Laura Phillips; Third: Cathy Cunningham; Second: Kathy Kerr; Lead: Heather Martin; Alternate: Susan Thomas	Mayflower CC, Halifax Skip: Virginia Jackson; Third: Janet Jesty; Second: Tracey Jennings; Lead: Susan Harris; Alternate: Penny LaRocque	Bayview G&CC, Thornhill Skip: Alison Goring; Third: Christine McCrady; Second: Diane McLean; Lead: Mary Bowman; Alternate: Patti McKnight
Prince Edward Island	Quebec	Saskatchewan	Yukon/Northwest Territories
Charlottetown CC, Charlottetown Skip: Rebecca Jean MacPhee; Third: Kim Dolan; Second: Marion MacAulay; Lead: Lou Ann Henry (Note: Team Prince Edward Island lead Lou Ann Henry suffered a right knee injury in the eighth end of Draw 8. Alternate Susan McInnis would throw lead stones for the last two ends of Draw 8 and continue to do so for the remainder of the tournament.); Alternate: Susan McInnis	Lacolle CC, Lacolle Skip: Guylaine Crispo; Third: Catherine Derick; Second: Linda Kyle; Lead: Caroline Boily; Alternate: Lisa Hoyt	Prince Albert G&CC, Prince Albert Skip: Sherry Anderson; Third: Kay Montgomery; Second: Donna Gignac; Lead: Elaine McCloy; Alternate: Twyla Fisher	Whitehorse CC, Whitehorse Skip: Dawn Moses; Third: Deb Stokes; Second: Lisa Leblanc; Lead: Loralee Leberge; Alternate: Diane Nohr

== Map of teams ==
Team Canada Provincial Winners

== Round Robin standings ==
Final Round Robin Standings

Key
Teams to Playoffs

Team	Skip	W	L	PF	PA	EW	EL	BE	SE	S%
Manitoba	Connie Laliberte	10	1	80	49	49	37	10	17	78%
Alberta	Cathy Borst	8	3	63	61	46	44	10	13	75%
Canada	Sandra Peterson	8	3	79	44	47	35	8	15	83%
Prince Edward Island	Rebecca Jean MacPhee	8	3	84	64	54	41	3	14	74%
Ontario	Alison Goring	7	4	78	64	51	43	7	21	78%
British Columbia	Marla Geiger	6	5	68	63	45	45	5	10	77%
Saskatchewan	Sherry Anderson	6	5	66	72	41	47	12	11	77%
Newfoundland	Laura Phillips	5	6	62	66	44	44	7	8	76%
New Brunswick	Heidi Hanlon	4	7	53	63	35	47	10	10	77%
Quebec	Guylaine Crispo	3	8	53	76	40	46	5	7	69%
Yukon/Northwest Territories	Dawn Moses	1	10	47	79	34	46	11	6	71%
Nova Scotia	Virginia Jackson	0	11	56	88	41	52	5	9	71%

== Round Robin results ==
All draw times are listed in Mountain Standard Time (UTC-06:00).

=== Draw 1 ===
Saturday, February 18, 1:30 pm

Sheet A	1	2	3	4	5	6	7	8	9	10	Final
British Columbia (Gieger) 🔨	0	0	1	0	0	2	0	1	0	X	4
Ontario (Goring)	1	1	0	0	3	0	1	0	2	X	8

Sheet B	1	2	3	4	5	6	7	8	9	10	Final
Quebec (Crispo) 🔨	2	0	1	0	0	1	0	0	1	0	5
Alberta (Borst)	0	2	0	0	3	0	0	0	0	1	6

Sheet C	1	2	3	4	5	6	7	8	9	10	11	Final
Nova Scotia (Jackson) 🔨	2	2	0	1	2	0	0	1	0	1	0	9
Saskatchewan (Anderson)	0	0	3	0	0	3	1	0	2	0	1	10

Sheet D	1	2	3	4	5	6	7	8	9	10	Final
Newfoundland (Phillips) 🔨	2	0	1	0	0	0	0	1	0	1	5
New Brunswick (Hanlon)	0	1	0	0	0	0	2	0	0	0	3

=== Draw 2 ===
Saturday, February 18, 6:30 pm

Sheet A	1	2	3	4	5	6	7	8	9	10	Final
Saskatchewan (Anderson) 🔨	0	0	3	0	0	1	0	1	4	2	11
Quebec (Crispo)	1	2	0	2	2	0	0	0	0	0	7

Sheet B	1	2	3	4	5	6	7	8	9	10	Final
Prince Edward Island (MacPhee) 🔨	2	0	2	0	2	0	3	0	2	X	11
Yukon/Northwest Territories (Moses)	0	1	0	2	0	2	0	1	0	X	6

Sheet C	1	2	3	4	5	6	7	8	9	10	Final
Canada (Peterson)	1	0	0	1	0	0	0	0	1	X	3
Manitoba (Laliberte)	0	0	1	0	1	0	1	1	0	X	4

Sheet D	1	2	3	4	5	6	7	8	9	10	11	Final
Alberta (Borst) 🔨	0	0	1	1	1	0	1	0	1	0	2	7
British Columbia (Gieger)	1	1	0	0	0	1	0	1	0	1	0	5

=== Draw 3 ===
Sunday, February 19, 9:00 am

Sheet B	1	2	3	4	5	6	7	8	9	10	Final
British Columbia (Gieger) 🔨	1	0	0	1	0	2	0	0	1	0	5
Canada (Peterson)	0	0	2	0	2	0	1	1	0	1	7

Sheet C	1	2	3	4	5	6	7	8	9	10	Final
Yukon/Northwest Territories (Moses) 🔨	0	0	0	1	0	0	0	0	2	0	3
Newfoundland (Phillips)	1	0	0	0	0	0	0	2	0	2	5

=== Draw 4 ===
Sunday, February 19, 1:30 pm

Sheet A	1	2	3	4	5	6	7	8	9	10	Final
New Brunswick (Hanlon) 🔨	0	1	0	0	0	0	0	2	0	2	5
Nova Scotia (Jackson)	0	0	0	0	1	1	1	0	1	0	4

Sheet B	1	2	3	4	5	6	7	8	9	10	Final
Manitoba (Laliberte) 🔨	2	0	0	1	2	0	2	0	3	X	10
Prince Edward Island (MacPhee)	0	0	1	0	0	2	0	1	0	X	4

Sheet C	1	2	3	4	5	6	7	8	9	10	Final
Quebec (Crispo) 🔨	0	1	0	1	0	0	1	0	1	X	4
Ontario (Goring)	1	0	1	0	1	1	0	1	0	X	5

Sheet D	1	2	3	4	5	6	7	8	9	10	Final
Canada (Peterson) 🔨	1	0	1	1	2	0	4	X	X	X	9
Yukon/Northwest Territories (Moses)	0	1	0	0	0	1	0	X	X	X	2

=== Draw 5 ===
Sunday, February 19, 6:30 pm

Sheet A	1	2	3	4	5	6	7	8	9	10	Final
Ontario (Goring) 🔨	0	1	0	1	0	1	0	2	0	0	5
Manitoba (Laliberte)	0	0	2	0	0	0	2	0	0	3	7

Sheet B	1	2	3	4	5	6	7	8	9	10	Final
Newfoundland (Phillips) 🔨	1	0	1	1	0	2	0	0	1	0	6
Saskatchewan (Anderson)	0	2	0	0	1	0	1	1	0	2	7

Sheet C	1	2	3	4	5	6	7	8	9	10	Final
Prince Edward Island (MacPhee) 🔨	1	2	1	2	2	1	X	X	X	X	9
New Brunswick (Hanlon)	0	0	0	0	0	0	X	X	X	X	0

Sheet D	1	2	3	4	5	6	7	8	9	10	11	Final
Nova Scotia (Jackson) 🔨	0	1	0	0	1	0	3	1	0	1	0	7
Alberta (Borst)	0	0	2	1	0	2	0	0	2	0	1	8

=== Draw 6 ===
Monday, February 20, 9:00 am

Sheet A	1	2	3	4	5	6	7	8	9	10	Final
Prince Edward Island (MacPhee) 🔨	1	0	0	0	1	0	2	0	1	3	8
Saskatchewan (Anderson)	0	0	1	0	0	3	0	2	0	0	6

Sheet B	1	2	3	4	5	6	7	8	9	10	Final
Nova Scotia (Jackson) 🔨	2	0	1	0	0	0	1	0	X	X	4
Ontario (Goring)	0	2	0	1	2	3	0	3	X	X	11

Sheet C	1	2	3	4	5	6	7	8	9	10	Final
Alberta (Borst) 🔨	1	1	0	1	1	0	0	1	0	2	7
Manitoba (Laliberte)	0	0	1	0	0	3	1	0	0	0	5

Sheet D	1	2	3	4	5	6	7	8	9	10	Final
New Brunswick (Hanlon) 🔨	1	0	3	0	1	1	0	3	X	X	9
Quebec (Crispo)	0	1	0	1	0	0	1	0	X	X	3

=== Draw 7 ===
Monday, February 20, 1:30 pm

Sheet A	1	2	3	4	5	6	7	8	9	10	Final
Quebec (Crispo) 🔨	0	2	0	1	0	0	0	1	0	X	4
Canada (Peterson)	2	0	1	0	0	4	1	0	0	X	8

Sheet B	1	2	3	4	5	6	7	8	9	10	Final
Ontario (Goring) 🔨	0	1	0	0	2	1	3	3	3	X	13
Yukon/Northwest Territories (Moses)	1	0	0	4	0	0	0	0	0	X	5

Sheet C	1	2	3	4	5	6	7	8	9	10	Final
Newfoundland (Phillips) 🔨	2	0	0	2	0	1	1	0	2	X	8
Alberta (Borst)	0	0	1	0	1	0	0	1	0	X	3

Sheet D	1	2	3	4	5	6	7	8	9	10	Final
Saskatchewan (Anderson) 🔨	0	0	0	1	0	1	0	0	1	X	3
British Columbia (Gieger)	0	0	1	0	2	0	3	1	0	X	7

=== Draw 8 ===
Monday, February 20, 6:30 pm

Sheet A	1	2	3	4	5	6	7	8	9	10	Final
Manitoba (Laliberte) 🔨	1	0	1	0	1	1	1	0	1	1	7
Newfoundland (Phillips)	0	1	0	4	0	0	0	1	0	0	6

Sheet B	1	2	3	4	5	6	7	8	9	10	Final
Canada (Peterson) 🔨	2	1	0	0	0	0	3	0	2	2	10
New Brunswick (Hanlon)	0	0	2	0	2	0	0	2	0	0	6

Sheet C	1	2	3	4	5	6	7	8	9	10	Final
Yukon/Northwest Territories (Moses) 🔨	0	1	0	1	0	1	0	1	1	2	7
Nova Scotia (Jackson)	0	0	1	0	0	0	2	0	0	0	3

Sheet D	1	2	3	4	5	6	7	8	9	10	Final
British Columbia (Gieger) 🔨	1	0	1	0	2	0	0	2	0	X	6
Prince Edward Island (MacPhee)	0	1	0	2	0	2	1	0	2	X	8

=== Draw 9 ===
Tuesday, February 21, 9:00 am

Sheet A	1	2	3	4	5	6	7	8	9	10	Final
Alberta (Borst) 🔨	0	0	0	0	1	0	0	0	2	0	4
Yukon/Northwest Territories (Moses)	0	0	0	0	0	0	2	0	0	1	3

Sheet B	1	2	3	4	5	6	7	8	9	10	Final
Newfoundland (Phillips)	2	0	0	1	0	1	0	1	X	X	5
Ontario (Goring)	0	0	2	0	5	0	2	0	X	X	9

Sheet C	1	2	3	4	5	6	7	8	9	10	Final
Canada (Peterson) 🔨	1	0	0	1	0	0	0	0	0	X	2
Saskatchewan (Anderson)	0	0	1	0	0	0	2	1	0	X	4

Sheet D	1	2	3	4	5	6	7	8	9	10	Final
Manitoba (Laliberte) 🔨	1	0	0	3	2	0	0	1	1	X	8
Nova Scotia (Jackson)	0	1	0	0	0	3	1	0	0	X	5

=== Draw 10 ===
Tuesday, February 21, 1:30 pm

Sheet A	1	2	3	4	5	6	7	8	9	10	Final
Nova Scotia (Jackson) 🔨	0	0	0	1	0	0	X	X	X	X	1
Canada (Peterson)	0	2	3	0	1	4	X	X	X	X	10

Sheet B	1	2	3	4	5	6	7	8	9	10	Final
Saskatchewan (Anderson) 🔨	2	0	0	0	0	1	0	X	X	X	3
Manitoba (Laliberte)	0	2	2	2	3	0	2	X	X	X	11

Sheet C	1	2	3	4	5	6	7	8	9	10	Final
New Brunswick (Hanlon) 🔨	0	0	1	0	0	0	1	0	1	X	3
British Columbia (Gieger)	0	1	0	0	2	0	0	1	0	X	4

Sheet D	1	2	3	4	5	6	7	8	9	10	Final
Quebec (Crispo) 🔨	3	0	1	0	1	0	0	1	0	1	7
Prince Edward Island (MacPhee)	0	1	0	0	0	2	1	0	1	0	5

=== Draw 11 ===
Tuesday, February 21, 6:30 pm

Sheet A	1	2	3	4	5	6	7	8	9	10	Final
Prince Edward Island (MacPhee) 🔨	1	0	0	1	0	1	1	1	0	0	5
Alberta (Borst)	0	0	2	0	1	0	0	0	2	1	6

Sheet B	1	2	3	4	5	6	7	8	9	10	Final
Yukon/Northwest Territories (Moses) 🔨	1	0	0	1	0	0	0	1	0	0	3
Quebec (Crispo)	0	0	1	0	1	0	1	0	0	3	6

Sheet C	1	2	3	4	5	6	7	8	9	10	11	Final
Ontario (Goring) 🔨	0	0	0	1	1	1	1	0	0	0	1	5
New Brunswick (Hanlon)	0	1	0	0	0	0	0	1	1	1	0	4

Sheet D	1	2	3	4	5	6	7	8	9	10	Final
British Columbia (Gieger) 🔨	1	0	0	1	1	0	2	0	0	3	8
Newfoundland (Phillips)	0	1	0	0	0	2	0	2	1	0	6

=== Draw 12 ===
Wednesday, February 22, 9:00 am

Sheet A	1	2	3	4	5	6	7	8	9	10	11	Final
Yukon/Northwest Territories (Moses) 🔨	0	0	0	2	2	0	1	2	0	0	0	7
British Columbia (Gieger)	0	0	1	0	0	1	0	0	3	2	1	8

Sheet B	1	2	3	4	5	6	7	8	9	10	Final
Alberta (Borst) 🔨	0	1	0	0	3	1	0	0	1	2	8
New Brunswick (Hanlon)	1	0	0	1	0	0	2	0	0	0	4

Sheet C	1	2	3	4	5	6	7	8	9	10	Final
Manitoba (Laliberte) 🔨	1	0	2	0	2	3	0	X	X	X	8
Quebec (Crispo)	0	1	0	1	0	0	1	X	X	X	3

Sheet D	1	2	3	4	5	6	7	8	9	10	Final
Prince Edward Island (MacPhee) 🔨	0	2	1	0	1	0	4	0	1	X	9
Ontario (Goring)	1	0	0	1	0	2	0	0	0	X	4

=== Draw 13 ===
Wednesday, February 22, 1:30 pm

Sheet A	1	2	3	4	5	6	7	8	9	10	Final
Newfoundland (Phillips) 🔨	1	0	0	1	0	0	0	X	X	X	2
Canada (Peterson)	0	1	0	0	1	5	1	X	X	X	8

Sheet B	1	2	3	4	5	6	7	8	9	10	Final
Nova Scotia (Jackson) 🔨	2	0	2	0	1	0	1	0	2	0	8
Prince Edward Island (MacPhee)	0	2	0	2	0	2	0	2	0	1	9

Sheet C	1	2	3	4	5	6	7	8	9	10	Final
Saskatchewan (Anderson) 🔨	2	2	0	1	0	1	0	1	0	X	7
Yukon/Northwest Territories (Moses)	0	0	0	0	2	0	2	0	1	X	5

Sheet D	1	2	3	4	5	6	7	8	9	10	Final
New Brunswick (Hanlon) 🔨	0	0	0	2	1	0	2	1	0	0	6
Manitoba (Laliberte) 🔨	0	1	1	0	0	3	0	0	2	1	8

=== Draw 14 ===
Wednesday, February 22, 6:30 pm

Sheet A	1	2	3	4	5	6	7	8	9	10	Final
Quebec (Crispo) 🔨	1	0	0	2	0	1	0	0	1	0	5
Newfoundland (Phillips)	0	2	2	0	1	0	0	1	0	1	7

Sheet B	1	2	3	4	5	6	7	8	9	10	Final
Canada (Peterson) 🔨	1	0	1	0	3	0	2	1	1	X	9
Alberta (Borst)	0	1	0	1	0	3	0	0	0	X	5

Sheet C	1	2	3	4	5	6	7	8	9	10	Final
British Columbia (Gieger) 🔨	2	0	1	0	0	1	0	2	0	2	8
Nova Scotia (Jackson)	0	1	0	1	0	0	2	0	2	0	6

Sheet D	1	2	3	4	5	6	7	8	9	10	11	Final
Ontario (Goring) 🔨	1	0	0	2	0	0	1	1	1	1	1	8
Saskatchewan (Anderson)	0	1	1	0	4	1	0	0	0	0	0	7

=== Draw 15 ===
Thursday, February 23, 9:00 am

Sheet A	1	2	3	4	5	6	7	8	9	10	Final
Saskatchewan (Anderson) 🔨	0	0	1	1	0	0	1	0	1	X	4
New Brunswick (Hanlon)	0	1	0	0	2	2	0	2	0	X	7

Sheet B	1	2	3	4	5	6	7	8	9	10	Final
British Columbia (Gieger) 🔨	0	2	0	1	3	0	3	X	X	X	9
Quebec (Crispo)	0	0	2	0	0	1	0	X	X	X	3

Sheet C	1	2	3	4	5	6	7	8	9	10	Final
Prince Edward Island (MacPhee) 🔨	1	0	1	0	2	1	0	1	0	1	7
Canada (Peterson)	0	1	0	1	0	0	1	0	2	0	5

Sheet D	1	2	3	4	5	6	7	8	9	10	Final
Nova Scotia (Jackson) 🔨	1	0	1	0	1	0	0	1	0	0	4
Newfoundland (Phillips)	0	2	0	0	0	1	1	0	1	1	6

=== Draw 16 ===
Thursday, February 23, 1:30 pm

Sheet A	1	2	3	4	5	6	7	8	9	10	11	Final
Ontario (Goring) 🔨	2	0	0	0	0	1	2	0	0	1	0	6
Alberta (Borst)	0	1	1	0	1	0	0	1	2	0	1	7

Sheet B	1	2	3	4	5	6	7	8	9	10	11	Final
Manitoba (Laliberte) 🔨	0	1	0	0	0	1	0	2	0	0	1	5
British Columbia (Gieger)	0	0	2	0	0	0	1	0	0	1	0	4

Sheet C	1	2	3	4	5	6	7	8	9	10	Final
Newfoundland (Phillips) 🔨	0	0	1	0	2	0	1	0	2	0	6
Prince Edward Island (MacPhee)	0	1	0	3	0	1	0	2	0	2	9

Sheet D	1	2	3	4	5	6	7	8	9	10	Final
New Brunswick (Hanlon) 🔨	2	0	0	1	0	0	2	0	1	X	6
Yukon/Northwest Territories (Moses)	0	0	1	0	1	0	0	1	0	X	3

=== Draw 17 ===
Thursday, February 23, 6:30 pm

Sheet A	1	2	3	4	5	6	7	8	9	10	Final
Yukon/Northwest Territories (Moses) 🔨	0	1	0	1	0	0	1	0	0	0	3
Manitoba (Laliberte)	0	0	2	0	0	1	0	0	1	3	7

Sheet B	1	2	3	4	5	6	7	8	9	10	Final
Quebec (Crispo) 🔨	0	0	2	0	0	2	0	0	1	1	6
Nova Scotia (Jackson)	0	0	0	2	1	0	1	1	0	0	5

Sheet C	1	2	3	4	5	6	7	8	9	10	Final
Alberta (Borst) 🔨	1	0	0	0	0	0	0	1	0	X	2
Saskatchewan (Anderson)	0	0	0	0	0	0	2	0	2	X	4

Sheet D	1	2	3	4	5	6	7	8	9	10	Final
Canada (Peterson) 🔨	3	0	1	0	0	1	0	0	1	2	8
Ontario (Goring)	0	1	0	1	1	0	1	0	0	0	4

== Tiebreakers ==
Loser to 3 vs. 4			Winner to 1 vs. 2 Loser to 3 vs. 4
			1	Canada	6
2	Prince Edward Island	3		Alberta	2
3	Alberta	8

=== Round 1 ===
Thursday, February 23, 10:30 pm

Sheet A	1	2	3	4	5	6	7	8	9	10	Final
Prince Edward Island (MacPhee)	0	0	1	0	1	0	1	0	0	X	3
Alberta (Borst) 🔨	0	2	0	0	0	5	0	0	1	X	8

Player percentages
Prince Edward Island		Alberta	
Susan McInnis	78%	Kate Horne	78%
Marion MacAulay	81%	Deanne Shields	82%
Kim Dolan	75%	Maureen Brown	90%
Rebecca Jean MacPhee	76%	Cathy Borst	82%
Total	77%	Total	83%

=== Round 2 ===
Friday, February 24, 8:30 am

Sheet C	1	2	3	4	5	6	7	8	9	10	Final
Alberta (Borst)	0	0	0	0	1	0	1	0	0	0	2
Canada (Peterson) 🔨	1	0	0	0	0	1	0	1	0	3	6

Player percentages
Alberta		Canada	
Kate Horne	75%	Marcia Gudereit	91%
Deanne Shields	95%	Joan McCusker	93%
Maureen Brown	73%	Jan Betker	83%
Cathy Borst	80%	Sandra Peterson	89%
Total	81%	Total	89%

== Playoffs ==
Page playoff system
1	Manitoba	6
2	Canada	4
3	Alberta	6
4	Prince Edward Island	4

Semifinal
2	Canada	5
3	Alberta	7

Final
1	Manitoba	6
3	Alberta	5

=== 3 vs. 4 ===
Friday, February 24, 1:30 pm

Sheet B	1	2	3	4	5	6	7	8	9	10	Final
Prince Edward Island (MacPhee)	0	0	0	2	0	0	1	0	1	X	4
Alberta (Borst) 🔨	0	2	0	0	1	1	0	2	0	X	6

Player percentages
Prince Edward Island		Alberta	
Susan McInnis	80%	Kate Horne	78%
Marion MacAulay	78%	Deanne Shields	91%
Kim Dolan	73%	Maureen Brown	85%
Rebecca Jean MacPhee	83%	Cathy Borst	82%
Total	84%	Total	78%

=== 1 vs. 2 ===
Friday, February 24, 6:30 pm

Sheet B	1	2	3	4	5	6	7	8	9	10	Final
Manitoba (Laliberte) 🔨	0	1	0	1	0	1	0	1	0	2	6
Canada (Peterson)	0	0	1	0	1	0	1	0	1	0	4

Player percentages
Manitoba		Canada	
Janet Arnott	89%	Marcia Gudereit	89%
Cathy Gauthier	78%	Joan McCusker	74%
Cathy Overton	85%	Jan Betker	75%
Connie Laliberte	75%	Sandra Peterson	80%
Total	82%	Total	79%

=== Semifinal ===
Saturday, February 25, 1:30 pm

Sheet B	1	2	3	4	5	6	7	8	9	10	Final
Canada (Peterson) 🔨	1	0	1	0	0	1	0	0	2	X	5
Alberta (Borst)	0	1	0	0	2	0	0	4	0	X	7

Player percentages
Canada		Alberta	
Marcia Gudereit	93%	Kate Horne	74%
Joan McCusker	86%	Deanne Shields	91%
Jan Betker	81%	Maureen Brown	73%
Sandra Peterson	71%	Cathy Borst	92%
Total	83%	Total	83%

=== Final ===
Sunday, February 26, 11:30 am

Sheet B	1	2	3	4	5	6	7	8	9	10	Final
Manitoba (Laliberte) 🔨	1	0	0	1	0	2	0	1	0	1	6
Alberta (Borst)	0	0	1	0	2	0	1	0	1	0	5

Player percentages
Manitoba		Alberta	
Janet Arnott	79%	Kate Horne	88%
Cathy Gauthier	75%	Deanne Shields	83%
Cathy Overton	80%	Maureen Brown	88%
Connie Laliberte	88%	Cathy Borst	83%
Total	80%	Total	85%

== Statistics ==
=== Top 5 player percentages ===
Final Round Robin Percentages

Key
All-Star Team

Leads	%
(Canada) Marcia Gudereit	86
(Manitoba) Janet Arnott	81
(New Brunswick) Jane Arseneau	81
(Ontario) Mary Bowman	80
(Newfoundland and Labrador) Heather Martin	79

Seconds	%
(Canada) Joan McCusker	82
(British Columbia) Sherry Fraser	79
(Ontario) Diane McLean	79
(Alberta) Deanne Shields	79
(New Brunswick) Nancy McConnery	78

Thirds	%
(Canada) Jan Betker	82
(Saskatchewan) Kay Montgomery	80
(Manitoba) Cathy Overton	78
(Ontario) Christine McCrady	77
(Newfoundland and Labrador) Cathy Cunningham	77
(New Brunswick) Kathy Floyd	77

Skips	%
(Canada) Sandra Peterson	81
(Prince Edward Island) Rebecca Jean MacPhee	80
(Manitoba) Connie Laliberte	79
(British Columbia) Marla Geiger	78
(Alberta) Cathy Borst	76
(Saskatchewan) Sherry Anderson	76

== Awards ==
The all-star team and sportsmanship award winners were as follows:

=== All-Star Team ===
Position	Name	Team
Skip	Rebecca Jean MacPhee	Prince Edward Island
Third	Kay Montgomery	Saskatchewan
Second	Joan McCusker (2)	Canada
Lead	Janet Arnott	Manitoba

=== Robert Stewart Award ===
The Scotties Tournament of Hearts Sportsmanship Award is presented to the curler who best embodies the spirit of curling at the Scotties Tournament of Hearts. The winner was selected in a vote by all players at the tournament.

Prior to 1998, the award was named after a notable individual in the curling community where the tournament was held that year. For this edition, the award was named after Robert Stewart, who was the chairman of the board and CEO of Scott Paper and was awarded the Canadian Curling Association Board of Governors Special Recognition Award in 1995.

Name	Team	Position
Alison Goring (2)	Ontario	Skip

=== Ford Hot Shots ===
Starting with the 1995 tournament, Ford began a tradition of a skills competition preceding the round robin of the tournament. Each competitor had to perform a series of shots with each shot scoring between 0 and 5 points depending on where the stone came to rest. The winner of the inaugural edition of the event would win a two-year lease on a Ford Contour GL.

Winner	Runner-Up
(Saskatchewan) Kay Montgomery	(Quebec) Catherine Derick
