= Cathy Overton-Clapham =

Canadian curler (born 1969)

- Curler
- Born: Cathy Overton; July 19, 1969 (age 57); Winnipeg, Manitoba, Canada

Team
- Curling club: Fort Rouge CC, Winnipeg, MB

Curling career
- Hearts: 13 (1991, 1995, 1996, 1999, 2000, 2005, 2006, 2007, 2008, 2009, 2010, 2011, 2021)
- Top CTRS ranking: 1st (2005–06, 2006–07, 2007–08, 2009–10)
- Grand Slam victories: 10 (2006 Players', 2007 Autumn Gold, 2007 Players', 2008 Wayden Transportation, 2009 Players', 2009 Autumn Gold, 2011 Autumn Gold, 2014 Masters, 2016 Players', 2018 Canadian Open)
Medal record
Women's curling
Representing Canada
World Championships
Gold medal – first place	2008 Vernon
Silver medal – second place	1995 Brandon
Bronze medal – third place	2010 Swift Current
World Junior Championships
Bronze medal – third place	1990 Portage la Prairie
Representing Manitoba
Scotties Tournament of Hearts
Gold medal – first place	1995 Calgary
Gold medal – first place	2005 St. John's
Gold medal – first place	2008 Regina
Gold medal – first place	2009 Victoria
Gold medal – first place	2010 Sault Ste. Marie
Silver medal – second place	2006 London
Bronze medal – third place	1996 Thunder Bay
Bronze medal – third place	1999 Charlottetown
Bronze medal – third place	2000 Prince George
Bronze medal – third place	2007 Lethbridge
Representing Alberta
Canadian Olympic Curling Trials
Silver medal – second place	2017 Ottawa

Cathy Overton-Clapham (born Cathy Overton, July 19, 1969) nicknamed "Cathy O" is a Canadian curler. Overton-Clapham is one of Manitoba's most decorated female curlers, with one world championship, five national championships, and thirteen Scotties Tournament of Hearts appearances. In 2019, she began coaching in the United States, and currently coaches the Tabitha Peterson team.

In 2019, Overton-Clapham was named the fifth greatest Canadian curler in history in a TSN poll of broadcasters, reporters and top curlers.

== Career ==
Overton-Clapham skipped Team Manitoba to a 1989 Canadian Junior Curling Championships win. This qualified her for the 1990 World Junior Curling Championships, during which she won a bronze medal for team Canada. Overton-Clapham had been to one other Canadian Junior Championship, having played third for Janet Harvey in 1986, finishing third.

In 1991, Overton-Clapham made her first trip to the Scott Tournament of Hearts, Canada's national women's curling championship. She played third for Kathie Allardyce and the team finished with a 5–6 record.

In 1995, she returned to the Tournament of Hearts, this time as third for Connie Laliberte. The team won the Hearts that year, and went on to win the silver medal at the 1995 Ford World Curling Championships, losing to Sweden's Elisabet Gustafson in the final. Overton-Clapham would also play at the 1996, 1999, and 2000 Hearts for Laliberte, finishing third each time.

Starting the 1999–2000 season, Overton-Clapham would begin throwing fourth stones for Laliberte. When Laliberte became pregnant, Overton-Clapham would take over as skip of the team. Now, skipping the squad, Jill Staub, was brought in at third, Debbie Jones-Walker and Janet Arnott remained at second and lead. Overton-Clapham would skip the team to victory winning the Manitoba Provincials. With Laliberte rejoining the squad for Nationals, Overton-Clapham would move back to throwing fourth stones, with Laliberte calling the game, and Staub moving to fifth. They would finish third at the 2000 Scott Tournament of Hearts losing the semi-final to British Columbia's Kelley Law.

=== Jones partnership success ===
Overton-Clapham would again return to the Hearts in 2005, but as a third for Jennifer Jones. There at the 2005 Scott Tournament of Hearts, the team won the championship, defeating Jenn Hanna of Ontario in the final. The team would go on to finish fourth at the 2005 World Women's Curling Championship.

Together the team would participate in the 2005 Canadian Olympic Curling Trials, but would finish 5-4 failing to reach the playoffs.

The team returned to the 2006 Scott Tournament of Hearts as Team Canada, but they lost in the final to Kelly Scott of British Columbia. At the 2007 Scotties Tournament of Hearts, the team lost the semi-final. At the 2008 Scotties Tournament of Hearts, Overton-Clapham won another national title.

The Jones team went to the 2009 Scotties Tournament of Hearts as the reigning champions. They again reached the finals where they faced British Columbia and won thanks to a steal of two in the seventh end. The team went on the 2009 World Women's Curling Championship again as the returning championships but were unable to repeat there, losing to Denmark in the bronze medal game.

The team would again participate in the 2009 Canadian Olympic Curling Trials, and with many expecting them to take the championship, disappointed many along with themselves. The team would only win 2 games, tied for second last place, with a 2–5 record.

Returning to the 2010 Scotties Tournament of Hearts again as part of the Jones team and Team Canada, Overton-Clapham won the national title for the third year in a row. The win was Overton-Clapham's 5th Scotties title in total and moved her one off of Colleen Jones in the record book and alongside the legendary Joyce McKee of Saskatchewan and Nova Scotians Mary Anne Arsenault, Nancy Delahunt, and Kim Kelly.

=== 2010–2011 ===
After playing third for Jennifer Jones' rink for many years, this partnership came to an end after the 2009-10 curling season. The Jennifer Jones team decided to replace her with young former Canadian Junior Champion Kaitlyn Lawes, and ousted Overton-Clapham from the team. Later, Overton-Clapham said in an interview that she was blindsided by the team, she was shocked by this judgment but could tell by the Jones team's behaviour that something was up. Overton's admitted her desire to continue curling however, and she stated that she will be returning to the ice with a new team for the 2010–2011 season. Her new team was to consist of Raunora Westcott and Leslie Wilson, who previously played with Manitoba's 2010 provincial champion Jill Thurston, and former Canadian Junior Champion Breanne Meakin.

With her new team Overton-Clapham has a successful start to the 2010-11 curling season. However young third Breanne Meakin qualified for the 2011 Canadian Junior Curling Championships, forcing Overton-Clapham to find a new third for the 2011 Manitoba Scotties Tournament of Hearts. On short notice, Karen Fallis was selected to take Meakin's place and Meakin was slotted in as the team's alternate. So with a new team formed, Overton-Clapham won the provincial championships over Chelsea Carey by a score of 7–4. Overton-Clapham's team played Jennifer Jones' rink in the round-robin at the 2011 Scotties Tournament of Hearts on February 23. Despite a poor start to the 2011 Scotties, the match against Jones was still hyped by media. Overton-Clapham would win the match 8–5, the crowd cheered her every shot, and were chanting "Cathy-O" as the two teams shook hands. The final event the team would play together was the 2011 Players' Championships Grand Slam of Curling event. They would finish 0–3 in a triple knockout format.

=== 2011–2013 ===
Overton-Clapham announced she will once again have a new team for the 2011 season. Her second Leslie Wilson decided she wanted to take a year off from curling and her lead Raunora Westcott was unsure as to what she would do. Karen Fallis, who filled in for Breanne Meakin during the Manitoba Scotties, and played third stones during the 2011 Scotties, skips her own Manitoba team and will not return to the team. Together the Team mutually decided they would part ways. Breanne Meakin will remain with Overton-Clapham, and the two will add two time Canadian Junior Champion Jenna Loder and Ashley Howard, daughter of three time world Champion and 2006 Olympic Gold Medallist Russ Howard, as she will be attending school in Manitoba.

Overton-Clapham's team found early success in the season when they won the first Grand Slam Event, the 2011 Curlers Corner Autumn Gold Curling Classic. Modifying her initial lineup, Loder moved to third, Howard to second and Meakin to lead, the team won the third qualification. In the playoffs Overton-Clapham defeated Stefanie Lawton, Sherry Middaugh and in the final Amy Nixon to win the championship.

At the 2012 Players' Championship team Overton-Clapham finished at the top of the standings at the end of the round robin, with a 6–1 record. They went on to defeat Sherry Middaugh in the semifinal and faced Stefanie Lawton in the final. Although the team eventually lost the final to Lawton, their overall performance in Grand Slam events of the season gave them the Capital One Cup for 2012 and a $50,000 prize. The team's overall success during the 2011–12 season would also qualify them for a place in the 2012 Canada Cup of Curling and the 2013 Canadian Olympic Curling Pre-Trials. However, on February 1, 2013, Overton-Clapham announced she would be leaving her team and taking a break from the game.

=== 2017–Present ===
Overton-Clapham continued to curl in 2017, joining up with Team Carey consisting of, Chelsea Carey, Jocelyn Peterman and Laine Peters after Amy Nixon stepped away from curling. She had great success throughout the year, she lost the Canadian curling Olympic Trials in 2017 against Rachel Homan. Team Carey went undefeated until losing to Team Homan in the Final 6–4.

She first started coaching in the United States in 2019, where she coached Team Jamie Sinclair., as well as team Cory Christensen when Christensen represented the US at the 2022 World Women's Curling Championship. Starting in 2023, Overton-Clapham began to coach Team Tabitha Peterson, where the team has had great success, winning the 2023, 2024, and 2025 US Women's national championships.

== Personal life ==
Overton-Clapham is married and has two children. She owns RSC Inc. She currently lives in Heritage Pointe, Alberta.

== Grand Slam record ==
Key
C	Champion
F	Lost in Final
SF	Lost in Semifinal
QF	Lost in Quarterfinals
R16	Lost in the round of 16
Q	Did not advance to playoffs
T2	Played in Tier 2 event
DNP	Did not participate in event
N/A	Not a Grand Slam event that season

Event	2005–06	2006–07	2007–08	2008–09	2009–10	2010–11	2011–12	2012–13	2013–14	2014–15	2015–16	2016–17	2017–18	2018–19
Elite 10	N/A	N/A	N/A	N/A	N/A	N/A	N/A	N/A	N/A	N/A	N/A	N/A	N/A	QF
The Masters	N/A	N/A	N/A	N/A	N/A	N/A	N/A	Q	DNP	C	DNP	DNP	DNP	Q
Tour Challenge	N/A	N/A	N/A	N/A	N/A	N/A	N/A	N/A	N/A	N/A	T2	DNP	T2	QF
The National	N/A	N/A	N/A	N/A	N/A	N/A	N/A	N/A	N/A	N/A	DNP	F	SF	DNP
Canadian Open	N/A	N/A	N/A	N/A	N/A	N/A	N/A	N/A	N/A	Q	DNP	F	C	QF
Players' Championships	C	C	Q	C	QF	Q	F	DNP	Q	DNP	C	SF	Q	DNP
Champions Cup	N/A	N/A	N/A	N/A	N/A	N/A	N/A	N/A	N/A	N/A	DNP	QF	QF	DNP

=== Former events ===
Event	2006–07	2007–08	2008–09	2009–10	2010–11	2011–12	2012–13	2013–14	2014–15
Autumn Gold	Q	C	Q	C	Q	C	Q	Q	SF
Manitoba Lotteries	F	F	QF	F	F	SF	Q	QF	N/A
Colonial Square Ladies Classic	N/A	N/A	N/A	N/A	N/A	N/A	Q	Q	DNP
Wayden Transportation	QF	Q	C	N/A	N/A	N/A	N/A	N/A	N/A
Sobeys Slam	N/A	Q	Q	N/A	SF	N/A	N/A	N/A	N/A

== Awards ==
- 2011 Marj Mitchell Sportsmanship Award
- 2008 STOH Sandra Schmirler Most Valuable Player Award
- 1990 - WJCC All-Star skip

== Bibliography ==
- "Warrior's Dream". (Paul Wiecek). Winnipeg Free Press, 27 February 2009. Retrieved 27 May 2012. (Interview with Cathy Overton-Clapham)
