= 1999 Scott Tournament of Hearts =

Canadian women's curling championship

- Host city: Charlottetown, Prince Edward Island
- Arena: Charlottetown Civic Centre
- Dates: February 20–28
- Attendance: 48,224
- Winner: Nova Scotia
- Curling club: Mayflower CC, Halifax
- Skip: Colleen Jones
- Third: Kim Kelly
- Second: Mary-Anne Waye
- Lead: Nancy Delahunt
- Alternate: Laine Peters
- Finalist: Canada (Cathy Borst)

The 1999 Scott Tournament of Hearts, the Canadian women's national curling championship, was held from February 20 to 28, 1999 at the Charlottetown Civic Centre in Charlottetown, Prince Edward Island. The total attendance for the week was 48,224.

Team Nova Scotia, who was skipped by Colleen Jones won the event after beating defending champion Cathy Borst and Team Canada 6–4 in the final. This was Nova Scotia's first championship since 1983 and third overall and the second championship skipped by Jones, who previously won in 1982.

The seventeen years between championships for Jones not only broke the women's record for longest period between title wins, which was held by Marilyn Bodogh who went ten years between titles (1986 and 1996), but also broke the Canadian record regardless of gender between title wins which was previously held by Ab Gowanlock, who went fifteen years between Brier wins (1938 and 1953).

Jones' rink would go onto represent Canada at the 1999 Ford World Women's Curling Championship held on home soil in Saint John, New Brunswick where they missed the playoffs after finishing round robin play with a 4–5 record. This was the first time since 1982 (also skipped by Jones) in which Canada missed the playoffs at the world championship.

== Teams ==
The teams were listed as follows:

Team Canada	Alberta	British Columbia	Manitoba
Ottewell CC, Edmonton Skip: Cathy Borst; Third: Heather Godberson; Second: Brenda Bohmer; Lead: Kate Horne; Alternate: Rona McGregor	Sexsmith CC, Sexsmith Skip: Renée Handfield; Third: Marcy Balderston; Second: Tina McDonald; Lead: Karen McNamee; Alternate: Raylene Rocque	Juan de Fuca CC, Victoria Skip: Pat Sanders (Note: For Draws 12, 15, and 16, Team British Columbia alternate Shalegh Beddington threw third stones, third Michelle Harding threw skip stones, while skip Pat Sanders sat out those draws with flu-like symptoms.); Third: Michelle Harding; Second: Cindy Tucker; Lead: Denise Byers (Note: Team British Columbia alternate Shalegh Beddington threw lead stones in Draw 10.); Alternate: Shalegh Beddington	Fort Rouge CC, Winnipeg Skip: Connie Laliberte; Third: Cathy Overton-Clapham; Second: Debbie Jones-Walker; Lead: Janet Arnott; Alternate: Jill Staub
New Brunswick	Newfoundland	Nova Scotia	Ontario
Thistle St. Andrews CC, Saint John Fourth: Marie-Anne Power (Note: For Draw 7, Team New Brunswick alternate Mary Harding threw lead stones, lead Jane Arseneau threw third stones, skip Kathy Floyd (who usually threw third stones) threw skip stones, while fourth Marie-Anne Power was away attending her mother-in-law's funeral.); Skip: Kathy Floyd; Second: Allison Franey; Lead: Jane Arseneau (Note: Team New Brunswick alternate Mary Harding threw lead stones in Draw 17.); Alternate: Mary Harding	St. John's CC, St. John's Skip: Heather Strong; Third: Kelli Sharpe; Second: Susan Wright; Lead: Michele Renouf; Alternate: Kim Bourque	Mayflower CC, Halifax Skip: Colleen Jones; Third: Kim Kelly; Second: Mary-Anne Waye; Lead: Nancy Delahunt; Alternate: Laine Peters	Unionville CC, Unionville Skip: Kim Gellard; Third: Sherry Scheirich; Second: Sally Karam; Lead: Allison Ross; Alternate: Mary Gellard
Prince Edward Island	Quebec	Saskatchewan	Northwest Territories/Yukon
Charlottetown CC, Charlottetown Skip: Rebecca Jean MacPhee; Third: Kim Dolan; Second: Kathy O'Rourke; Lead: Lou Ann Henry; Alternate: Shelly Bradley	Rosemere CC, Montreal Skip: Janique Berthelot; Third: Joelle Sabourin; Second: Annie Lemay; Lead: Nancy Lemire	Hillcrest Sports, Moose Jaw Skip: Cindy Street; Third: Brandee Davis; Second: Allison Tanner; Lead: Shannon Wilson; Alternate: Amber Holland	Yellowknife CC, Yellowknife Skip: Maureen Miller; Third: Wendy Ondrack; Second: Twyla Tincher; Lead: Debbie Moss; Alternate: Sandra Penkala

== Map of teams ==
Team Canada Provincial Winners

== Round Robin standings ==
Final Round Robin standings

Key
Teams to Playoffs

Team	Skip	W	L	PF	PA	EW	EL	BE	SE	S%
Manitoba	Connie Laliberte	8	3	69	55	44	39	12	14	79%
Nova Scotia	Colleen Jones	8	3	66	57	43	37	11	15	77%
Saskatchewan	Cindy Street	7	4	74	53	45	41	8	16	78%
Canada	Cathy Borst	7	4	73	57	44	37	2	13	82%
Newfoundland	Heather Strong	6	5	55	60	40	42	7	12	76%
Prince Edward Island	Rebecca Jean MacPhee	6	5	61	64	43	46	11	11	76%
New Brunswick	Kathy Floyd	5	6	64	67	45	43	5	13	73%
Alberta	Renée Handfield	5	6	62	66	44	43	11	12	76%
Ontario	Kim Gellard	4	7	63	77	44	52	1	6	72%
Northwest Territories/Yukon	Maureen Miller	4	7	63	67	46	44	8	13	71%
British Columbia	Pat Sanders	3	8	57	75	36	47	11	6	72%
Quebec	Janique Berthelot	3	8	63	72	44	47	9	14	75%

== Round Robin results ==
All draw times are listed in Atlantic Standard Time (UTC-04:00).

=== Draw 1 ===
Saturday, February 20, 3:00 pm

Sheet A	1	2	3	4	5	6	7	8	9	10	Final
Quebec (Berthelot) 🔨	1	0	0	0	1	0	0	1	0	0	3
Northwest Territories/Yukon (Miller)	0	2	0	0	0	0	1	0	1	1	5

Sheet B	1	2	3	4	5	6	7	8	9	10	Final
Saskatchewan (Street)	0	0	1	0	2	1	1	1	0	X	6
Prince Edward Island (MacPhee) 🔨	0	0	0	0	0	0	0	0	1	X	1

Sheet C	1	2	3	4	5	6	7	8	9	10	Final
Canada (Borst)	0	1	0	0	2	1	0	1	0	0	5
Manitoba (Laliberte) 🔨	1	0	0	1	0	0	1	0	2	2	7

Sheet D	1	2	3	4	5	6	7	8	9	10	Final
Alberta (Handfield) 🔨	0	0	2	4	1	2	0	X	X	X	9
Newfoundland (Strong)	0	1	0	0	0	0	1	X	X	X	2

=== Draw 2 ===
Saturday, February 20, 8:00 pm

Sheet A	1	2	3	4	5	6	7	8	9	10	Final
Manitoba (Laliberte) 🔨	0	0	0	1	0	3	1	1	0	X	6
Saskatchewan (Street)	0	0	0	0	1	0	0	0	0	X	1

Sheet B	1	2	3	4	5	6	7	8	9	10	Final
British Columbia (Sanders)	0	0	0	2	0	3	0	0	0	X	5
Nova Scotia (Jones) 🔨	0	2	0	0	2	0	2	0	2	X	8

Sheet C	1	2	3	4	5	6	7	8	9	10	Final
New Brunswick (Floyd)	0	1	0	1	0	1	0	X	X	X	3
Ontario (Gellard) 🔨	3	0	2	0	1	0	3	X	X	X	9

Sheet D	1	2	3	4	5	6	7	8	9	10	Final
Prince Edward Island (MacPhee) 🔨	0	1	1	1	0	1	3	0	3	X	10
Quebec (Berthelot)	0	0	0	0	1	0	0	2	0	X	3

=== Draw 3 ===
Sunday, February 21, 10:00 am

Sheet B	1	2	3	4	5	6	7	8	9	10	Final
Quebec (Berthelot) 🔨	0	2	0	1	0	0	3	0	1	0	7
New Brunswick (Floyd)	1	0	1	0	1	1	0	3	0	1	8

Sheet C	1	2	3	4	5	6	7	8	9	10	Final
Nova Scotia (Jones) 🔨	0	0	0	0	0	1	0	0	1	1	3
Alberta (Handfield)	0	0	0	2	0	0	0	0	0	0	2

=== Draw 4 ===
Sunday, February 21, 3:00 pm

Sheet A	1	2	3	4	5	6	7	8	9	10	Final
Newfoundland (Strong) 🔨	0	0	1	0	1	0	1	0	0	X	3
Canada (Borst)	0	1	0	1	0	1	0	1	1	X	5

Sheet B	1	2	3	4	5	6	7	8	9	10	Final
Ontario (Gellard) 🔨	1	0	0	0	1	0	1	0	X	X	3
British Columbia (Sanders)	0	0	1	4	0	1	0	3	X	X	9

Sheet C	1	2	3	4	5	6	7	8	9	10	Final
Saskatchewan (Street) 🔨	2	1	1	3	0	0	2	X	X	X	9
Northwest Territories/Yukon (Miller)	0	0	0	0	2	0	0	X	X	X	2

Sheet D	1	2	3	4	5	6	7	8	9	10	Final
New Brunswick (Floyd) 🔨	2	2	0	0	0	0	0	1	0	X	5
Nova Scotia (Jones)	0	0	1	1	2	0	0	0	3	X	7

=== Draw 5 ===
Sunday, February 21, 8:00 pm

Sheet A	1	2	3	4	5	6	7	8	9	10	11	Final
Northwest Territories/Yukon (Miller) 🔨	0	0	1	1	1	0	0	1	0	1	0	5
Ontario (Gellard)	1	1	0	0	0	1	1	0	1	0	1	6

Sheet B	1	2	3	4	5	6	7	8	9	10	11	Final
Alberta (Handfield) 🔨	1	0	1	1	0	1	0	0	0	1	1	6
Manitoba (Laliberte)	0	2	0	0	0	0	2	1	0	0	0	5

Sheet C	1	2	3	4	5	6	7	8	9	10	Final
British Columbia (Sanders) 🔨	0	0	0	1	0	0	1	0	1	X	3
Newfoundland (Strong)	0	0	0	0	2	1	0	1	0	X	4

Sheet D	1	2	3	4	5	6	7	8	9	10	Final
Canada (Borst) 🔨	0	1	1	0	0	0	0	0	0	0	2
Prince Edward Island (MacPhee)	0	0	0	0	0	0	0	1	1	1	3

=== Draw 6 ===
Monday, February 22, 10:00 am

Sheet A	1	2	3	4	5	6	7	8	9	10	Final
British Columbia (Sanders) 🔨	2	0	2	2	0	0	2	0	1	X	9
Manitoba (Laliberte)	0	1	0	0	2	0	0	2	0	X	5

Sheet B	1	2	3	4	5	6	7	8	9	10	Final
Canada (Borst) 🔨	0	1	0	3	0	1	0	2	0	0	7
Northwest Territories/Yukon (Miller)	1	0	1	0	2	0	1	0	0	1	6

Sheet C	1	2	3	4	5	6	7	8	9	10	Final
Prince Edward Island (MacPhee) 🔨	1	0	1	0	2	0	2	0	0	2	8
Ontario (Gellard)	0	1	0	1	0	1	0	2	1	0	6

Sheet D	1	2	3	4	5	6	7	8	9	10	Final
Newfoundland (Strong) 🔨	1	0	1	0	1	0	0	2	0	X	5
Saskatchewan (Street)	0	3	0	1	0	1	1	0	5	X	11

=== Draw 7 ===
Monday, February 22, 3:00 pm

Sheet A	1	2	3	4	5	6	7	8	9	10	Final
Saskatchewan (Street) 🔨	0	1	1	0	0	1	0	1	0	1	5
New Brunswick (Floyd)	0	0	0	1	1	0	1	0	1	0	4

Sheet B	1	2	3	4	5	6	7	8	9	10	11	Final
Northwest Territories/Yukon (Miller) 🔨	0	1	1	0	0	2	0	1	0	1	0	6
Nova Scotia (Jones)	0	0	0	2	2	0	1	0	1	0	1	7

Sheet C	1	2	3	4	5	6	7	8	9	10	11	Final
Alberta (Handfield) 🔨	0	2	0	2	0	2	0	1	0	0	0	7
Prince Edward Island (MacPhee)	0	0	1	0	2	0	1	0	2	1	1	8

Sheet D	1	2	3	4	5	6	7	8	9	10	Final
Manitoba (Laliberte) 🔨	0	0	2	0	1	0	2	0	3	X	8
Quebec (Berthelot)	0	1	0	0	0	0	0	2	0	X	3

=== Draw 8 ===
Monday, February 22, 8:00 pm

Sheet A	1	2	3	4	5	6	7	8	9	10	11	Final
Ontario (Gellard) 🔨	1	0	0	0	0	1	0	2	0	2	0	6
Alberta (Handfield)	0	0	1	1	2	0	1	0	1	0	1	7

Sheet B	1	2	3	4	5	6	7	8	9	10	Final
New Brunswick (Floyd) 🔨	2	0	1	0	0	1	0	0	0	X	4
Newfoundland (Strong)	0	0	0	3	2	0	1	1	1	X	8

Sheet C	1	2	3	4	5	6	7	8	9	10	Final
Nova Scotia (Jones) 🔨	0	2	0	3	2	0	4	X	X	X	11
Canada (Borst)	0	0	1	0	0	2	0	X	X	X	3

Sheet D	1	2	3	4	5	6	7	8	9	10	11	Final
Quebec (Berthelot) 🔨	1	1	0	0	1	0	0	1	0	1	0	5
British Columbia (Sanders)	0	0	1	0	0	1	1	0	2	0	1	6

=== Draw 9 ===
Tuesday, February 23, 10:00 am

Sheet A	1	2	3	4	5	6	7	8	9	10	Final
Prince Edward Island (MacPhee) 🔨	1	1	0	0	1	0	0	1	0	1	5
Nova Scotia (Jones)	0	0	1	1	0	2	1	0	1	0	6

Sheet B	1	2	3	4	5	6	7	8	9	10	11	Final
Alberta (Handfield) 🔨	1	0	0	0	2	0	0	0	2	0	0	5
Northwest Territories/Yukon (Miller)	0	1	0	1	0	0	2	0	0	1	1	6

Sheet C	1	2	3	4	5	6	7	8	9	10	Final
New Brunswick (Floyd) 🔨	1	0	0	1	0	0	2	1	2	X	7
Manitoba (Laliberte)	0	1	0	0	2	0	0	0	0	X	3

Sheet D	1	2	3	4	5	6	7	8	9	10	Final
Ontario (Gellard) 🔨	1	0	1	0	0	2	0	X	X	X	4
Canada (Borst)	0	2	0	3	4	0	1	X	X	X	10

=== Draw 10 ===
Tuesday, February 23, 3:00 pm

Sheet A	1	2	3	4	5	6	7	8	9	10	Final
Canada (Borst) 🔨	0	2	1	0	3	0	3	0	1	X	10
New Brunswick (Floyd)	0	0	0	1	0	2	0	2	0	X	5

Sheet B	1	2	3	4	5	6	7	8	9	10	11	Final
Manitoba (Laliberte) 🔨	0	1	1	0	3	0	2	0	1	0	1	9
Ontario (Gellard)	1	0	0	1	0	2	0	2	0	2	0	8

Sheet C	1	2	3	4	5	6	7	8	9	10	Final
Newfoundland (Strong) 🔨	0	0	0	1	0	0	0	0	X	X	1
Quebec (Berthelot)	0	0	1	0	1	1	1	3	X	X	7

Sheet D	1	2	3	4	5	6	7	8	9	10	Final
Saskatchewan (Street) 🔨	0	4	1	0	0	1	0	2	2	X	10
British Columbia (Sanders)	2	0	0	1	0	0	2	0	0	X	5

=== Draw 11 ===
Tuesday, February 23, 8:00 pm

Sheet A	1	2	3	4	5	6	7	8	9	10	Final
British Columbia (Sanders) 🔨	1	0	0	1	0	2	0	2	0	X	6
Prince Edward Island (MacPhee)	0	3	2	0	1	0	2	0	1	X	9

Sheet B	1	2	3	4	5	6	7	8	9	10	11	12	Final
Nova Scotia (Jones) 🔨	1	0	0	3	0	1	0	1	1	0	0	1	8
Saskatchewan (Street)	0	0	2	0	1	0	2	0	0	2	0	0	7

Sheet C	1	2	3	4	5	6	7	8	9	10	Final
Northwest Territories/Yukon (Miller) 🔨	0	1	0	1	0	0	0	1	0	1	4
Newfoundland (Strong)	0	0	1	0	1	1	2	0	1	0	6

Sheet D	1	2	3	4	5	6	7	8	9	10	Final
Quebec (Berthelot) 🔨	2	0	1	1	0	2	2	0	X	X	8
Alberta (Handfield)	0	1	0	0	2	0	0	1	X	X	4

=== Draw 12 ===
Wednesday, February 24, 10:00 am

Sheet A	1	2	3	4	5	6	7	8	9	10	Final
Nova Scotia (Jones) 🔨	0	0	0	3	0	0	1	2	0	1	7
Quebec (Berthelot)	0	1	2	0	0	2	0	0	0	0	5

Sheet B	1	2	3	4	5	6	7	8	9	10	Final
Prince Edward Island (MacPhee) 🔨	0	0	2	0	2	0	1	0	1	0	6
Newfoundland (Strong)	1	0	0	2	0	1	0	3	0	1	8

Sheet C	1	2	3	4	5	6	7	8	9	10	Final
Ontario (Gellard) 🔨	0	1	0	0	0	0	1	X	X	X	2
Saskatchewan (Street)	0	0	2	1	2	2	0	X	X	X	7

Sheet D	1	2	3	4	5	6	7	8	9	10	Final
British Columbia (Sanders) 🔨	0	0	0	3	0	2	0	1	0	X	6
Northwest Territories/Yukon (Miller)	1	2	2	0	1	0	2	0	2	X	10

=== Draw 13 ===
Wednesday, February 24, 3:00 pm

Sheet A	1	2	3	4	5	6	7	8	9	10	Final
Alberta (Handfield) 🔨	1	0	0	2	0	1	0	1	X	X	5
New Brunswick (Floyd)	0	2	0	0	5	0	3	0	X	X	10

Sheet B	1	2	3	4	5	6	7	8	9	10	Final
Canada (Borst) 🔨	2	2	1	4	X	X	X	X	X	X	9
British Columbia (Sanders)	0	0	0	0	X	X	X	X	X	X	0

Sheet C	1	2	3	4	5	6	7	8	9	10	Final
Manitoba (Laliberte) 🔨	0	1	1	1	1	0	0	1	0	X	5
Nova Scotia (Jones)	0	0	0	0	0	2	0	0	0	X	2

Sheet D	1	2	3	4	5	6	7	8	9	10	Final
Newfoundland (Strong) 🔨	0	2	0	1	0	2	1	0	1	0	7
Ontario (Gellard)	0	0	2	0	1	0	0	1	0	1	5

=== Draw 14 ===
Wednesday, February 24, 8:00 pm

Sheet A	1	2	3	4	5	6	7	8	9	10	Final
Saskatchewan (Street) 🔨	1	0	1	0	2	0	1	0	0	0	5
Alberta (Handfield)	0	1	0	1	0	2	0	0	2	1	7

Sheet B	1	2	3	4	5	6	7	8	9	10	Final
New Brunswick (Floyd) 🔨	1	0	1	0	0	0	1	0	2	0	5
Prince Edward Island (MacPhee)	0	0	0	2	1	1	0	2	0	1	7

Sheet C	1	2	3	4	5	6	7	8	9	10	11	Final
Quebec (Berthelot) 🔨	0	3	0	1	0	1	0	0	2	0	0	7
Canada (Borst)	0	0	1	0	2	0	3	0	0	1	1	8

Sheet D	1	2	3	4	5	6	7	8	9	10	Final
Northwest Territories/Yukon (Miller) 🔨	0	1	0	1	0	3	0	2	1	X	8
Manitoba (Laliberte)	0	0	1	0	6	0	4	0	0	X	11

=== Draw 15 ===
Thursday, February 25, 10:00 am

Sheet A	1	2	3	4	5	6	7	8	9	10	Final
Manitoba (Laliberte) 🔨	1	0	0	0	2	0	0	0	0	1	4
Newfoundland (Strong)	0	1	0	0	0	1	0	0	1	0	3

Sheet B	1	2	3	4	5	6	7	8	9	10	Final
Quebec (Berthelot) 🔨	1	0	0	1	2	0	1	0	2	1	8
Saskatchewan (Street)	0	2	3	0	0	1	0	1	0	0	7

Sheet C	1	2	3	4	5	6	7	8	9	10	Final
British Columbia (Sanders) 🔨	1	0	1	0	0	0	2	0	0	X	4
New Brunswick (Floyd)	0	1	0	1	1	0	0	3	1	X	7

Sheet D	1	2	3	4	5	6	7	8	9	10	Final
Canada (Borst) 🔨	1	0	0	0	2	0	3	0	3	X	9
Alberta (Handfield)	0	0	2	1	0	1	0	1	0	X	5

=== Draw 16 ===
Thursday, February 25, 3:00 pm

Sheet A	1	2	3	4	5	6	7	8	9	10	Final
Northwest Territories/Yukon (Miller) 🔨	0	0	3	0	3	2	1	X	X	X	9
Prince Edward Island (MacPhee)	0	0	0	1	0	0	0	X	X	X	1

Sheet B	1	2	3	4	5	6	7	8	9	10	Final
Ontario (Gellard) 🔨	1	1	0	1	0	0	3	0	0	2	8
Quebec (Berthelot)	0	0	2	0	1	1	0	2	1	0	7

Sheet C	1	2	3	4	5	6	7	8	9	10	11	Final
Alberta (Handfield) 🔨	0	2	0	0	1	0	0	0	1	0	1	5
British Columbia (Sanders)	1	0	1	1	0	0	0	0	0	1	0	4

Sheet D	1	2	3	4	5	6	7	8	9	10	Final
Newfoundland (Strong) 🔨	0	0	1	0	0	1	3	3	X	X	8
Nova Scotia (Jones)	1	0	0	1	0	0	0	0	X	X	2

=== Draw 17 ===
Thursday, February 25, 8:00 pm

Sheet A	1	2	3	4	5	6	7	8	9	10	Final
Nova Scotia (Jones) 🔨	1	1	0	1	0	0	1	1	0	0	5
Ontario (Gellard)	0	0	2	0	2	0	0	0	2	0	6

Sheet B	1	2	3	4	5	6	7	8	9	10	11	Final
Saskatchewan (Street) 🔨	0	0	1	0	4	0	0	0	0	0	1	6
Canada (Borst)	0	0	0	1	0	1	1	1	0	1	0	5

Sheet C	1	2	3	4	5	6	7	8	9	10	Final
Prince Edward Island (MacPhee) 🔨	2	0	0	0	1	0	0	0	0	X	3
Manitoba (Laliberte)	0	1	1	1	0	1	1	1	0	X	6

Sheet D	1	2	3	4	5	6	7	8	9	10	Final
New Brunswick (Floyd) 🔨	1	0	1	0	0	1	1	1	1	X	6
Northwest Territories/Yukon (Miller)	0	1	0	1	0	0	0	0	0	X	2

== Playoffs ==
Page playoffs
1	Manitoba	3
2	Nova Scotia	6
3	Saskatchewan	4
4	Canada	12

Semifinal
1	Manitoba	4
4	Canada	10

Final
2	Nova Scotia	6
4	Canada	4

=== 3 vs. 4 ===
Friday, February 26, 3:00 pm

Team	1	2	3	4	5	6	7	8	9	10	Final
Saskatchewan (Street) 🔨	0	1	0	0	2	0	1	0	X	X	4
Canada (Borst)	0	0	3	3	0	1	0	5	X	X	12

Player percentages
Saskatchewan		Canada	
Shannon Wilson	83%	Kate Horne	88%
Allison Tanner	78%	Brenda Bohmer	81%
Beandee Davis	66%	Heather Godberson	91%
Cindy Street	55%	Cathy Borst	64%
Total	70%	Total	81%

=== 1 vs. 2 ===
Friday, February 26, 8:00 pm

Sheet B	1	2	3	4	5	6	7	8	9	10	Final
Manitoba (Laliberte) 🔨	0	0	1	1	0	0	0	1	0	X	3
Nova Scotia (Jones)	0	0	0	0	1	2	1	0	2	X	6

Player percentages
Manitoba		Nova Scotia	
Janet Arnott	93%	Nancy Delahunt	96%
Debbie Jones-Walker	78%	Mary-Anne Waye	75%
Cathy Overton-Clapham	83%	Kim Kelly	88%
Connie Laliberte	74%	Colleen Jones	74%
Total	82%	Total	83%

=== Semifinal ===
Saturday, February 27, 3:00 pm

Sheet C	1	2	3	4	5	6	7	8	9	10	Final
Canada (Borst)	1	0	1	1	0	2	0	5	X	X	10
Manitoba (Laliberte) 🔨	0	1	0	0	1	0	2	0	X	X	4

Player percentages
Canada		Manitoba	
Kate Horne	78%	Janet Arnott	84%
Brenda Bohmer	81%	Debbie Jones-Walker	83%
Heather Godberson	78%	Cathy Overton-Clapham	83%
Cathy Borst	84%	Connie Laliberte	52%
Total	80%	Total	75%

=== Final ===
Sunday, February 28, 11:30 am (Note: CBC was originally supposed to broadcast the final at 2:30 pm AST, but a labour dispute at CBC forced the final to be moved to 11:30 am AST so that it could be broadcast on TSN.)

Sheet C	1	2	3	4	5	6	7	8	9	10	Final
Canada (Borst)	0	0	0	0	1	0	0	3	0	0	4
Nova Scotia (Jones) 🔨	0	1	0	1	0	2	1	0	0	1	6

Player percentages
Canada		Nova Scotia	
Kate Horne	99%	Nancy Delahunt	85%
Brenda Bohmer	76%	Mary-Anne Waye	71%
Heather Godberson	74%	Kim Kelly	83%
Cathy Borst	72%	Colleen Jones	80%
Total	80%	Total	80%

== Statistics ==
=== Top 5 player percentages ===
Final Round Robin Percentages

Key
First All-Star Team
Second All-Star Team

Leads	%
(Canada) Kate Horne	83
(Alberta) Karen McNamee	80
(Prince Edward Island) Lou Ann Henry	80
(Saskatchewan) Shannon Wilson	80
(Nova Scotia) Nancy Delahunt	80

Seconds	%
(Canada) Brenda Bohmer	85
(Manitoba) Debbie Jones-Walker	78
(Nova Scotia) Mary-Anne Waye	78
(Prince Edward Island) Kathy O'Rourke	76
(Newfoundland and Labrador) Susan Wright	75
(Saskatchewan) Allison Tanner	75
(Ontario) Sally Karam	75

Thirds	%
(Canada) Heather Godberson	83
(Alberta) Marcy Balderston	80
(Manitoba) Cathy Overton-Clapham	80
(Nova Scotia) Kim Kelly	77
(Saskatchewan) Brandee Davis	76

Skips	%
(Saskatchewan) Cindy Street	79
(Canada) Cathy Borst	79
(Manitoba) Connie Laliberte	78
(Newfoundland and Labrador) Heather Strong	76
(Alberta) Renée Handfield	74
(Nova Scotia) Colleen Jones	74

=== Perfect Games ===
Player	Team	Position	Shots	Opponent
Denise Byers	British Columbia	Lead	18	Manitoba
Heather Godberson (unofficial) (Note: British Columbia conceded the game after the fourth end and therefore Gobertson's perfect game does not count as an official perfect game in the record books since she did not throw at least ten shots.)	Canada	Third	8	British Columbia

== Awards ==
The all-star team and award winners were as follows.

=== All-Star teams ===
==== First Team ====
Position	Name	Team
Skip	Colleen Jones	Nova Scotia
Third	Heather Godberson	Canada
Second	Brenda Bohmer (2)	Canada
Lead	Lou Ann Henry	Prince Edward Island

==== Second Team ====
Position	Name	Team
Skip	Connie Laliberte	Manitoba
Third	Marcy Balderston	Alberta
Second	Mary-Anne Waye	Nova Scotia
Lead	Kate Horne	Canada

=== Marj Mitchell Sportsmanship Award ===
The Marj Mitchell Sportsmanship Award is presented to the curler who best embodies the spirit of curling at the Scotties Tournament of Hearts. The winner was selected in a vote by all players at the tournament. The award is named after Marj Mitchell who skipped her team to a Canadian championship in 1980 before dying from cancer in 1983.

Name	Team	Position
Jane Arseneau	New Brunswick	Lead

=== Most Valuable Player Award ===
The Most Valuable Player Award is presented to the curler chosen by TSN commentators for their outstanding play during the playoff round.

Name	Team	Position
Kim Kelly	Nova Scotia	Third

=== Ford Hot Shots ===
The Ford Hot Shots was a skills competition preceding the round robin of the tournament. Each competitor had to perform a series of shots with each shot scoring between 0 and 5 points depending on where the stone came to rest. The winner of this edition of the event would win a two-year lease on a Mercury Mystique LS.

Winner	Runner-Up	Score
(Alberta) Marcy Balderston	(Saskatchewan) Cindy Street	16–14

=== Shot of the Week Award ===
The Shot of the Week Award was voted on by TSN commentators and presented to the curler who had been determined with the most outstanding shot during the championship.

Name	Team	Position
Cathy Borst	Canada	Skip
