= 1998 Scott Tournament of Hearts =

Canadian women's curling championship

- Host city: Regina, Saskatchewan
- Arena: Agridome
- Dates: February 21–March 1
- Attendance: 154,688
- Winner: Alberta
- Curling club: Ottewell CC, Edmonton
- Skip: Cathy Borst
- Third: Heather Godberson
- Second: Brenda Bohmer
- Lead: Kate Horne
- Alternate: Rona McGregor
- Coach: Darryl Horne
- Finalist: Ontario (Anne Merklinger)

The 1998 Scott Tournament of Hearts, the Canadian women's national curling championship, was held from February 21 to March 1 at the Agridome in Regina, Saskatchewan. This was the last major tournament in which Sandra Schmirler participated in prior to her death in 2000. The total attendance for the week set a record 154,688 which broke the previous mark set in 1993 by exactly 66,666. As of 2025, this remains the attendance record for the event.

Team Alberta, who was skipped by Cathy Borst won the championship as they defeated Ontario in the final 7–6 in an extra end. This was Alberta's fifth title overall and their first since 1981. This was also the only title skipped by Borst as well. Borst's rink would go onto represent Canada at the 1998 Ford World Women's Curling Championship on home soil in Kamloops, British Columbia where they won the bronze medal.

Both the defending champions and the Saskatchewan provincial champions came from the Caledonian Curling Club in Regina, Saskatchewan making the Caledonian the first curling club to have two teams in the same tournament since the introduction of Team Canada in 1986.

== Teams ==
The teams were listed as follows:

Team Canada	Alberta	British Columbia	Manitoba
Caledonian CC, Regina Skip: Sandra Schmirler; Third: Jan Betker; Second: Joan McCusker; Lead: Marcia Gudereit; Alternate: Atina Ford	Ottewell CC, Edmonton Skip: Cathy Borst; Third: Heather Godberson; Second: Brenda Bohmer; Lead: Kate Horne; Alternate: Rona McGregor	Kamloops CC, Kamloops Skip: Sue Garvey; Third: Jan Wiltzen; Second: Allison MacInnes; Lead: Val Lahucik; Alternate: Lindsay Kosteniuk	Brandon CC, Brandon Skip: Lois Fowler; Third: Betty Couling; Second: Sharon Fowler; Lead: Jocelyn Beever; Alternate: Maureen Bonar
New Brunswick	Newfoundland	Nova Scotia	Ontario
Thistle St. Andrews CC, Saint John Skip: Kathy Floyd; Third: June Campbell; Second: Allison Franey; Lead: Jane Arseneau; Alternate: Mary Harding	St. John's CC, St. John's Skip: Heather Strong; Third: Kelli Sharpe; Second: Michele Renouf; Lead: Karen Thomas; Alternate: Peg Goss	Mayflower CC, Halifax Skip: Mary Mattatall; Third: Angie Bryant; Second: Lisa MacLeod; Lead: Heather Hopkins; Alternate: Hayley Clarke	Rideau CC, Ottawa Skip: Anne Merklinger; Third: Theresa Breen; Second: Patti McKnight; Lead: Audrey Frey; Alternate: Christine McCrady
Prince Edward Island	Quebec	Saskatchewan	Northwest Territories/Yukon
Charlottetown CC, Charlottetown Skip: Tammi Lowther; Third: Susan McInnis; Second: Shelley Muzika; Lead: Julie Scales; Alternate: Donna Lank	Riverbend Alma CC, Alma Skip: Marie-Claude Carlos; Third: Nathalie Gagnon; Second: Julie Blackburn; Lead: Sylvie Fortin; Alternate: Maude Martel	Caledonian CC, Regina Skip: Cathy Trowell; Third: Kristy Lewis; Second: Karen Daku; Lead: Keri-Lynn Schikowski; Alternate: Nancy Inglis	Yellowknife CC, Yellowknife Skip: Kelly Kaylo; Third: Dawn Moses; Second: Sharon Cormier (Note: Team Northwest Territories/Yukon alternate Kerry Koe threw second stones in Draw 16.); Lead: Cheryl Burlington; Alternate: Kerry Koe

== Map of teams ==
Team Canada Provincial Winners

== Round Robin Standings ==
Final Round Robin standings

Key
Teams to Playoffs
Teams to Tiebreaker

Team	Skip	W	L	PF	PA	EW	EL	BE	SE	S%
Alberta	Cathy Borst	10	1	73	33	43	29	8	18	80%
Ontario	Anne Merklinger	8	3	81	56	43	47	3	6	79%
Canada	Sandra Schmirler	7	4	74	57	44	39	7	11	80%
British Columbia	Sue Garvey	6	5	67	65	46	46	3	13	75%
Saskatchewan	Cathy Trowell	6	5	63	63	37	42	12	9	75%
New Brunswick	Kathy Floyd	5	6	70	73	47	45	3	10	73%
Northwest Territories/Yukon	Kelly Kaylo	5	6	56	78	41	46	11	4	70%
Newfoundland	Heather Strong	4	7	50	63	40	44	6	9	69%
Manitoba	Lois Fowler	4	7	65	72	43	48	3	6	72%
Nova Scotia	Mary Mattatall	4	7	70	79	45	51	3	7	75%
Prince Edward Island	Tammi Lowther	4	7	62	67	43	48	7	11	77%
Quebec	Marie-Claude Carlos	3	8	51	76	45	46	5	10	67%

== Round Robin Results ==
All draw times are listed in Central Standard Time (UTC-06:00).

=== Draw 1 ===
Saturday, February 21, 1:00 pm

Sheet A	1	2	3	4	5	6	7	8	9	10	Final
Newfoundland (Strong)	0	1	0	1	0	0	1	0	1	X	4
British Columbia (Garvey) 🔨	1	0	1	0	1	2	0	1	0	X	6

Sheet B	1	2	3	4	5	6	7	8	9	10	Final
Manitoba (Fowler)	0	1	0	1	0	2	0	0	X	X	4
Saskatchewan (Trowell) 🔨	2	0	2	0	1	0	3	2	X	X	10

Sheet C	1	2	3	4	5	6	7	8	9	10	Final
Canada (Schmirler) 🔨	1	0	1	0	2	0	1	0	0	1	6
New Brunswick (Floyd)	0	1	0	1	0	0	0	2	0	0	4

Sheet D	1	2	3	4	5	6	7	8	9	10	Final
Prince Edward Island (Lowther)	1	0	3	0	0	2	0	2	1	X	9
Northwest Territories/Yukon (Kaylo) 🔨	0	1	0	0	2	0	1	0	0	X	4

=== Draw 2 ===
Saturday, February 21, 6:30 pm

Sheet A	1	2	3	4	5	6	7	8	9	10	Final
New Brunswick (Floyd) 🔨	1	1	0	3	0	3	0	1	0	1	10
Manitoba (Fowler)	0	0	2	0	1	0	3	0	3	0	9

Sheet B	1	2	3	4	5	6	7	8	9	10	Final
Alberta (Borst)	0	2	0	0	1	0	1	1	0	X	5
Ontario (Merklinger) 🔨	1	0	0	1	0	1	0	0	1	X	4

Sheet C	1	2	3	4	5	6	7	8	9	10	11	Final
Nova Scotia (Mattatall) 🔨	2	0	1	2	0	0	0	1	0	2	0	8
Quebec (Carlos)	0	1	0	0	1	2	2	0	2	0	1	9

Sheet D	1	2	3	4	5	6	7	8	9	10	Final
Saskatchewan (Trowell) 🔨	0	1	1	0	0	0	0	3	0	X	5
Newfoundland (Strong)	0	0	0	0	1	0	0	0	1	X	2

=== Draw 3 ===
Sunday, February 22, 9:00 am

Sheet B	1	2	3	4	5	6	7	8	9	10	11	Final
Newfoundland (Strong) 🔨	0	0	1	1	1	0	2	0	1	0	1	7
Nova Scotia (Mattatall)	0	0	0	0	0	2	0	2	0	2	0	6

Sheet C	1	2	3	4	5	6	7	8	9	10	Final
Ontario (Merklinger) 🔨	1	0	2	0	2	2	0	5	X	X	12
Prince Edward Island (Lowther)	0	1	0	1	0	0	2	0	X	X	4

=== Draw 4 ===
Sunday, February 22, 1:00 pm

Sheet A	1	2	3	4	5	6	7	8	9	10	Final
Northwest Territories/Yukon (Kaylo) 🔨	0	1	0	1	0	1	0	0	1	X	4
Canada (Schmirler)	0	0	2	0	2	0	2	4	0	X	10

Sheet B	1	2	3	4	5	6	7	8	9	10	Final
Quebec (Carlos) 🔨	1	0	0	1	0	1	0	1	1	X	5
Alberta (Borst)	0	1	0	0	3	0	2	0	0	X	6

Sheet C	1	2	3	4	5	6	7	8	9	10	Final
Manitoba (Fowler) 🔨	1	2	0	0	0	2	0	2	2	X	9
British Columbia (Garvey)	0	0	1	1	1	0	2	0	0	X	5

Sheet D	1	2	3	4	5	6	7	8	9	10	Final
Nova Scotia (Mattatall) 🔨	0	1	0	4	0	1	0	1	0	2	9
Ontario (Merklinger)	1	0	1	0	2	0	2	0	2	0	8

=== Draw 5 ===
Sunday, February 22, 6:30 pm

Sheet A	1	2	3	4	5	6	7	8	9	10	11	Final
British Columbia (Garvey) 🔨	1	0	2	0	0	2	0	0	0	1	0	6
Quebec (Carlos)	0	1	0	0	1	0	1	1	2	0	1	7

Sheet B	1	2	3	4	5	6	7	8	9	10	Final
Prince Edward Island (Lowther) 🔨	0	4	0	0	0	0	2	0	0	1	7
New Brunswick (Floyd)	0	0	2	1	0	0	0	1	1	0	5

Sheet C	1	2	3	4	5	6	7	8	9	10	Final
Alberta (Borst) 🔨	0	0	0	1	0	1	0	0	1	0	3
Northwest Territories/Yukon (Kaylo)	0	0	0	0	1	0	0	2	0	2	5

Sheet D	1	2	3	4	5	6	7	8	9	10	Final
Canada (Schmirler) 🔨	0	1	0	2	0	1	0	1	3	X	8
Saskatchewan (Trowell)	0	0	1	0	0	0	2	0	0	X	3

=== Draw 6 ===
Monday, February 23, 9:00 am

Sheet A	1	2	3	4	5	6	7	8	9	10	Final
Alberta (Borst) 🔨	0	2	0	0	2	0	2	0	1	X	7
New Brunswick (Floyd)	0	0	1	1	0	1	0	1	0	X	4

Sheet B	1	2	3	4	5	6	7	8	9	10	Final
Canada (Schmirler) 🔨	1	0	1	0	1	0	1	0	1	0	5
British Columbia (Garvey)	0	2	0	0	0	1	0	1	0	3	7

Sheet C	1	2	3	4	5	6	7	8	9	10	Final
Saskatchewan (Trowell) 🔨	1	0	2	1	0	1	0	0	0	0	5
Quebec (Carlos)	0	1	0	0	1	0	1	0	1	0	4

Sheet D	1	2	3	4	5	6	7	8	9	10	Final
Northwest Territories/Yukon (Kaylo) 🔨	1	0	0	1	0	1	0	1	0	1	5
Manitoba (Fowler)	0	1	0	0	1	0	1	0	1	0	4

=== Draw 7 ===
Monday, February 23, 1:00 pm

Sheet A	1	2	3	4	5	6	7	8	9	10	Final
Manitoba (Fowler) 🔨	1	2	0	1	0	1	0	2	3	X	10
Nova Scotia (Mattatall)	0	0	2	0	1	0	2	0	0	X	5

Sheet B	1	2	3	4	5	6	7	8	9	10	Final
British Columbia (Garvey) 🔨	1	0	1	1	0	1	0	2	0	0	6
Ontario (Merklinger)	0	1	0	0	2	0	1	0	2	1	7

Sheet C	1	2	3	4	5	6	7	8	9	10	Final
Prince Edward Island (Lowther) 🔨	0	0	0	2	0	1	2	1	0	X	6
Saskatchewan (Trowell)	0	0	1	0	0	0	0	0	1	X	2

Sheet D	1	2	3	4	5	6	7	8	9	10	Final
New Brunswick (Floyd) 🔨	1	0	2	0	1	0	0	2	0	X	6
Newfoundland (Strong)	0	1	0	1	0	0	1	0	1	X	4

=== Draw 8 ===
Monday, February 23, 6:30 pm

Sheet A	1	2	3	4	5	6	7	8	9	10	Final
Quebec (Carlos) 🔨	1	1	0	1	0	0	1	0	1	1	6
Prince Edward Island (Lowther)	0	0	2	0	1	0	0	2	0	0	5

Sheet B	1	2	3	4	5	6	7	8	9	10	Final
Nova Scotia (Mattatall) 🔨	2	0	2	0	1	1	2	0	2	X	10
Northwest Territories/Yukon (Kaylo)	0	2	0	1	0	0	0	3	0	X	6

Sheet C	1	2	3	4	5	6	7	8	9	10	Final
Ontario (Merklinger) 🔨	2	1	0	0	1	0	0	1	0	1	6
Canada (Schmirler)	0	0	1	1	0	2	0	0	1	0	5

Sheet D	1	2	3	4	5	6	7	8	9	10	Final
Newfoundland (Strong) 🔨	0	0	0	0	0	0	X	X	X	X	0
Alberta (Borst)	2	0	2	1	2	1	X	X	X	X	8

=== Draw 9 ===
Tuesday, February 24, 9:00 am

Sheet A	1	2	3	4	5	6	7	8	9	10	Final
Saskatchewan (Trowell) 🔨	1	0	0	0	0	0	3	1	0	0	5
Ontario (Merklinger)	0	0	2	1	1	1	0	0	0	1	6

Sheet B	1	2	3	4	5	6	7	8	9	10	Final
Prince Edward Island (Lowther) 🔨	0	0	1	0	1	0	2	0	1	0	5
British Columbia (Garvey)	1	1	0	2	0	2	0	1	0	1	8

Sheet C	1	2	3	4	5	6	7	8	9	10	Final
Nova Scotia (Mattatall) 🔨	2	0	3	0	0	1	0	1	0	X	7
New Brunswick (Floyd)	0	0	0	0	1	0	1	0	2	X	4

Sheet D	1	2	3	4	5	6	7	8	9	10	Final
Quebec (Carlos) 🔨	0	2	0	0	0	0	1	0	X	X	3
Canada (Schmirler)	1	0	0	3	4	1	0	0	X	X	9

=== Draw 10 ===
Tuesday, February 24, 1:00 pm

Sheet A	1	2	3	4	5	6	7	8	9	10	Final
Canada (Schmirler) 🔨	1	0	2	0	0	1	0	2	0	1	7
Nova Scotia (Mattatall)	0	1	0	1	0	0	2	0	2	0	6

Sheet B	1	2	3	4	5	6	7	8	9	10	Final
New Brunswick (Floyd) 🔨	1	0	1	1	0	1	0	1	1	X	6
Quebec (Carlos)	0	1	0	0	1	0	1	0	0	X	3

Sheet C	1	2	3	4	5	6	7	8	9	10	Final
Northwest Territories/Yukon (Kaylo) 🔨	0	2	0	1	0	0	0	1	0	2	6
Newfoundland (Strong)	0	0	1	0	2	0	0	0	1	0	4

Sheet D	1	2	3	4	5	6	7	8	9	10	Final
Manitoba (Fowler) 🔨	1	0	1	0	0	2	0	1	0	X	5
Alberta (Borst)	0	1	0	1	2	0	2	0	0	X	6

=== Draw 11 ===
Tuesday, February 24, 6:30 pm

Sheet A	1	2	3	4	5	6	7	8	9	10	Final
Alberta (Borst) 🔨	0	4	0	4	1	1	X	X	X	X	10
Saskatchewan (Trowell)	1	0	1	0	0	0	X	X	X	X	2

Sheet B	1	2	3	4	5	6	7	8	9	10	Final
Ontario (Merklinger) 🔨	1	0	3	0	1	0	1	2	0	X	8
Manitoba (Fowler)	0	1	0	1	0	1	0	0	2	X	5

Sheet C	1	2	3	4	5	6	7	8	9	10	Final
British Columbia (Garvey) 🔨	3	0	0	1	2	1	1	0	X	X	8
Northwest Territories/Yukon (Kaylo)	0	0	2	0	0	0	0	1	X	X	3

Sheet D	1	2	3	4	5	6	7	8	9	10	Final
Newfoundland (Strong) 🔨	2	0	0	0	0	2	0	1	0	1	6
Prince Edward Island (Lowther)	0	1	1	1	1	0	1	0	0	0	5

=== Draw 12 ===
Wednesday, February 25, 9:00 am

Sheet A	1	2	3	4	5	6	7	8	9	10	Final
Ontario (Merklinger) 🔨	1	1	0	1	0	0	0	2	0	1	6
Newfoundland (Strong)	0	0	1	0	1	1	0	0	1	0	4

Sheet B	1	2	3	4	5	6	7	8	9	10	Final
Saskatchewan (Trowell) 🔨	3	0	3	1	0	0	3	X	X	X	10
Northwest Territories/Yukon (Kaylo)	0	2	0	0	1	0	0	X	X	X	3

Sheet C	1	2	3	4	5	6	7	8	9	10	Final
Quebec (Carlos) 🔨	0	1	0	1	0	1	0	0	1	X	4
Manitoba (Fowler)	1	0	1	0	4	0	0	2	0	X	8

Sheet D	1	2	3	4	5	6	7	8	9	10	Final
Alberta (Borst) 🔨	0	3	1	1	4	X	X	X	X	X	9
British Columbia (Garvey)	0	0	0	0	0	X	X	X	X	X	0

=== Draw 13 ===
Wednesday, February 25, 1:00 pm

Sheet A	1	2	3	4	5	6	7	8	9	10	Final
Prince Edward Island (Lowther) 🔨	1	0	0	0	3	0	1	1	0	0	6
Nova Scotia (Mattatall)	0	0	4	1	0	1	0	0	1	1	8

Sheet B	1	2	3	4	5	6	7	8	9	10	Final
Canada (Schmirler) 🔨	0	0	2	0	0	0	X	X	X	X	2
Alberta (Borst)	1	0	0	3	1	4	X	X	X	X	9

Sheet C	1	2	3	4	5	6	7	8	9	10	Final
New Brunswick (Floyd) 🔨	0	1	0	2	0	0	0	2	0	X	5
Ontario (Merklinger)	1	0	2	0	1	3	1	0	1	X	9

Sheet D	1	2	3	4	5	6	7	8	9	10	11	Final
Northwest Territories/Yukon (Kaylo) 🔨	1	0	1	1	1	0	0	1	0	0	2	7
Quebec (Carlos)	0	2	0	0	0	0	1	0	1	1	0	5

=== Draw 14 ===
Wednesday, February 25, 6:30 pm

Sheet A	1	2	3	4	5	6	7	8	9	10	Final
Manitoba (Fowler) 🔨	0	1	0	1	0	2	0	1	1	X	6
Prince Edward Island (Lowther)	0	0	1	0	1	0	1	0	0	X	3

Sheet B	1	2	3	4	5	6	7	8	9	10	Final
Nova Scotia (Mattatall) 🔨	1	0	1	0	0	1	0	0	2	1	6
Saskatchewan (Trowell)	0	1	0	0	2	0	2	2	0	0	7

Sheet C	1	2	3	4	5	6	7	8	9	10	Final
Newfoundland (Strong) 🔨	1	0	2	0	1	0	0	0	0	X	4
Canada (Schmirler)	0	2	0	3	0	0	2	0	1	X	8

Sheet D	1	2	3	4	5	6	7	8	9	10	Final
British Columbia (Garvey) 🔨	0	2	0	1	0	3	0	0	0	0	6
New Brunswick (Floyd)	0	0	2	0	3	0	1	1	1	1	9

=== Draw 15 ===
Thursday, February 26, 9:00 am

Sheet A	1	2	3	4	5	6	7	8	9	10	Final
New Brunswick (Floyd) 🔨	0	2	0	0	2	0	1	0	1	3	9
Northwest Territories/Yukon (Kaylo)	1	0	0	3	0	1	0	1	0	0	6

Sheet B	1	2	3	4	5	6	7	8	9	10	Final
Newfoundland (Strong) 🔨	2	2	1	0	1	0	1	1	X	X	8
Manitoba (Fowler)	0	0	0	2	0	1	0	0	X	X	3

Sheet C	1	2	3	4	5	6	7	8	9	10	Final
Alberta (Borst) 🔨	1	0	1	0	0	1	0	3	0	X	6
Nova Scotia (Mattatall)	0	0	0	1	0	0	1	0	1	X	3

Sheet D	1	2	3	4	5	6	7	8	9	10	Final
Canada (Schmirler) 🔨	2	0	0	1	0	2	0	0	1	0	6
Prince Edward Island (Lowther)	0	2	1	0	3	0	1	1	0	1	9

=== Draw 16 ===
Thursday, February 26, 1:00 pm

Sheet A	1	2	3	4	5	6	7	8	9	10	Final
British Columbia (Garvey) 🔨	0	1	0	1	0	0	1	0	2	1	6
Saskatchewan (Trowell)	0	0	2	0	0	1	0	2	0	0	5

Sheet B	1	2	3	4	5	6	7	8	9	10	Final
Quebec (Carlos) 🔨	0	0	0	1	1	0	1	0	1	X	4
Newfoundland (Strong)	0	1	1	0	0	3	0	2	0	X	7

Sheet C	1	2	3	4	5	6	7	8	9	10	Final
Prince Edward Island (Lowther) 🔨	1	0	1	0	0	0	0	1	0	X	3
Alberta (Borst)	0	1	0	1	1	0	1	0	0	X	4

Sheet D	1	2	3	4	5	6	7	8	9	10	Final
Northwest Territories/Yukon (Kaylo) 🔨	0	0	1	0	1	0	2	0	1	2	7
Ontario (Merklinger)	0	0	0	2	0	2	0	2	0	0	6

=== Draw 17 ===
Thursday, February 26, 6:30 pm

Sheet A	1	2	3	4	5	6	7	8	9	10	Final
Ontario (Merklinger) 🔨	3	2	4	0	X	X	X	X	X	X	9
Quebec (Carlos)	0	0	0	1	X	X	X	X	X	X	1

Sheet B	1	2	3	4	5	6	7	8	9	10	Final
Manitoba (Fowler) 🔨	0	0	1	0	1	0	X	X	X	X	2
Canada (Schmirler)	0	2	0	2	0	4	X	X	X	X	8

Sheet C	1	2	3	4	5	6	7	8	9	10	Final
Saskatchewan (Trowell) 🔨	0	2	0	0	2	0	1	0	2	2	9
New Brunswick (Floyd)	0	0	4	0	0	3	0	1	0	0	8

Sheet D	1	2	3	4	5	6	7	8	9	10	Final
Nova Scotia (Mattatall) 🔨	0	1	0	0	0	1	0	0	X	X	2
British Columbia (Garvey)	0	0	1	1	1	0	5	1	X	X	9

== Tiebreaker ==
Friday, February 27, 9:00 am

Sheet B	1	2	3	4	5	6	7	8	9	10	Final
Saskatchewan (Trowell) 🔨	0	0	1	0	0	1	0	0	2	X	4
British Columbia (Garvey)	0	1	0	0	1	0	2	2	0	X	6

Player percentages
Saskatchewan		British Columbia	
Keri-Lynn Schikowski	91%	Val Lahucik	79%
Karen Daku	79%	Allison MacInnes	84%
Kristy Lewis	78%	Jan Wiltzen	84%
Cathy Trowell	68%	Sue Garvey	86%
Total	79%	Total	83%

== Playoffs ==
Page playoffs
1	Alberta	7
2	Ontario	6
3	Canada	9
4	British Columbia	3

Semifinal
2	Ontario	9
3	Canada	3

Final
1	Alberta	7
2	Ontario	6

=== 3 vs. 4 ===
Friday, February 27, 1:00 pm

Sheet C	1	2	3	4	5	6	7	8	9	10	Final
British Columbia (Garvey)	0	0	1	0	1	0	1	0	X	X	3
Canada (Schmirler) 🔨	1	0	0	2	0	4	0	2	X	X	9

Player percentages
British Columbia		Canada	
Val Lahucik	81%	Marcia Gudereit	80%
Allison MacInnes	64%	Joan McCusker	84%
Jan Wiltzen	77%	Jan Betker	86%
Sue Garvey	72%	Sandra Schmirler	91%
Total	73%	Total	85%

=== 1 vs. 2 ===
Friday, February 27, 6:30 pm

Sheet C	1	2	3	4	5	6	7	8	9	10	11	Final
Alberta (Borst) 🔨	1	0	0	1	1	0	2	0	0	1	1	7
Ontario (Merklinger)	0	1	1	0	0	2	0	1	1	0	0	6

Player percentages
Alberta		Ontario	
Kate Horne	72%	Audrey Frey	85%
Brenda Bohmer	72%	Patti McKnight	78%
Heather Godberson	68%	Theresa Breen	89%
Cathy Borst	57%	Anne Merklinger	66%
Total	67%	Total	79%

=== Semifinal ===
Saturday, February 28, 1:00 pm

Sheet C	1	2	3	4	5	6	7	8	9	10	Final
Canada (Schmirler)	0	1	0	0	1	0	1	0	X	X	3
Ontario (Merklinger) 🔨	1	0	1	1	0	3	0	3	X	X	9

Player percentages
Canada		Ontario	
Marcia Gudereit	80%	Audrey Frey	88%
Joan McCusker	78%	Patti McKnight	75%
Jan Betker	73%	Theresa Breen	81%
Sandra Schmirler	66%	Anne Merklinger	83%
Total	74%	Total	82%

=== Final ===
Sunday, March 1, 12:30 pm

Sheet C	1	2	3	4	5	6	7	8	9	10	11	Final
Alberta (Borst) 🔨	0	2	1	0	2	0	0	1	0	0	1	7
Ontario (Merklinger)	1	0	0	1	0	1	1	0	0	2	0	6

Player percentages
Alberta		Ontario	
Kate Horne	70%	Audrey Frey	84%
Brenda Bohmer	77%	Patti McKnight	74%
Heather Godberson	89%	Theresa Breen	85%
Cathy Borst	78%	Anne Merklinger	75%
Total	79%	Total	80%

== Statistics ==
=== Top 5 player percentages ===
Final Round Robin Percentages

Key
First All-Star Team
Second All-Star Team

Leads	%
(Nova Scotia) Heather Hopkins	85
(Canada) Marcia Gudereit	84
(Prince Edward Island) Julie Scales	81
(Ontario) Audrey Frey	81
(Alberta) Kate Horne	78
(Manitoba) Jocelyn Beever	78

Seconds	%
(Alberta) Brenda Bohmer	82
(Ontario) Patti McKnight	78
(Saskatchewan) Karen Daku	77
(Prince Edward Island) Shelley Muzika	77
(Canada) Joan McCusker	76

Thirds	%
(Canada) Jan Betker	85
(Ontario) Theresa Breen	80
(Alberta) Heather Godberson	80
(British Columbia) Jan Wiltzen	77
(Prince Edward Island) Susan McInnis	76

Skips	%
(Alberta) Cathy Borst	80
(Ontario) Anne Merklinger	76
(Canada) Sandra Schmirler	75
(Saskatchewan) Cathy Trowell	72
(Prince Edward Island) Tammi Lowther	72

=== Perfect Games ===
Player	Team	Position	Shots	Opponent
Anne Merklinger (unofficial) (Note: Quebec conceded the game after the fourth end and therefore Merklinger's perfect game does not count as an official perfect game in the record books since she did not throw at least ten shots.)	Ontario	Skip	8	Quebec

== Awards ==
The all-star team and award winners were as follows.

=== All-Star teams ===
Team Canada third Jan Betker became the first curler to be selected to the all-star team on four separate occasions as Betker was previously selected in 1987, 1994, and 1997 (first team).

==== First Team ====
Position	Name	Team
Skip	Cathy Borst	Alberta
Third	Jan Betker (4)	Canada
Second	Brenda Bohmer	Alberta
Lead	Marcia Gudereit	Canada

==== Second Team ====
Position	Name	Team
Skip	Anne Merklinger	Ontario
Third	Heather Godberson (2)	Alberta
Second	Patti McKnight	Ontario
Lead	Heather Hopkins	Nova Scotia

=== Marj Mitchell Sportsmanship Award ===
The Marj Mitchell Sportsmanship Award is presented to the curler who best embodies the spirit of curling at the Scotties Tournament of Hearts. The winner was selected in a vote by all players at the tournament. Beginning in 1998, the award was permanently named after Marj Mitchell who skipped her team to a Canadian championship in 1980 before dying from cancer in 1983.

Name	Team	Position
Anne Merklinger	Ontario	Skip

=== Most Valuable Player Award ===
The Most Valuable Player Award is presented to the curler chosen by TSN commentators for their outstanding play during the playoff round.

Name	Team	Position
Brenda Bohmer	Alberta	Second

=== Ford Hot Shots ===
The Ford Hot Shots was a skills competition preceding the round robin of the tournament. Each competitor had to perform a series of shots with each shot scoring between 0 and 5 points depending on where the stone came to rest. The winner of this edition of the event would win a two-year lease on a Mercury Mystique LS.

Winner	Runner-Up	Score
(New Brunswick) Allison Franey	(Alberta) Kate Horne	17–15

=== Shot of the Week Award ===
The Shot of the Week Award was voted on by TSN commentators and presented to the curler who had been determined with the most outstanding shot during the championship.

Name	Team	Position
Anne Merklinger	Ontario	Skip
