= Marcia Gudereit =

Canadian curler and Olympic gold medalist

Personal information
- Born: Marcia Schiml; September 8, 1965 (age 60) Moose Jaw, Saskatchewan

Sport
- Sport: Curling
Medal record
Women's curling
Representing Canada
Gold medal – first place	1998 Nagano	Team
World championships
Gold medal – first place	1993 Geneva	Team
Gold medal – first place	1994 Oberstdorf	Team
Gold medal – first place	1997 Berne	Team
Scotties Tournament of Hearts
Gold medal – first place	1993 Brandon
Gold medal – first place	1994 Kitchener
Gold medal – first place	1997 Vancouver
Silver medal – second place	2007 Lethbridge
Bronze medal – third place	1995 Calgary
Bronze medal – third place	1998 Regina
Canadian Olympic Curling Trials
Gold medal – first place	1997 Brandon

Marcia Gudereit (born September 8, 1965 as Marcia Schiml) is a Canadian curler.

Born in Moose Jaw, Saskatchewan, she was part of Team Schmirler, the women's curling team that won a gold medal at the 1998 Winter Olympics. This team is the only 3-time winner of the World Curling Championship (1993, 1994, 1997). After Sandra died, she remained in the team, now skipped by Jan Betker for whom she currently plays. She curls out of the Caledonia Curling Club in Regina, Saskatchewan and works as a systems analyst for The Co-operators.

In 2000, she was inducted into Canada's Sports Hall of Fame.

Not many people know that Marcia is ambidextrous. She writes with her left hand but curls with her right hand.
