= Cathy King =

Canadian curler

- Curler
- Born: September 3, 1959 (age 67); Winnipeg, Manitoba, Canada

Curling career
- Hearts: 7 (1995, 1997, 1998, 1999, 2002, 2005, 2006)
- World Championship: 1 (1998)
- Top CTRS ranking: 4th (2004-05, 2005-06)
- Grand Slam victories: 0
Medal record
Curling
Representing Canada
World Championships
Bronze medal – third place	1998 Kamloops
World Senior Championships
Gold medal – first place	2013 Fredericton
Representing Alberta
Scotties Tournament of Hearts
Gold medal – first place	1998 Regina
Silver medal – second place	1995 Calgary
Silver medal – second place	1999 Charlottetown

Cathy King (born September 3, 1959), formerly Cathy Borst (Cathy's married name was Borst – when she divorced she went back to her maiden name of King) is a Canadian curler from St. Albert, Alberta. She is a former Canadian champion skip and world championship bronze medallist, and 2013 world senior champion.

== Curling career ==
King was a national junior champion in 1977 and 1978, before there was a women's world junior championship. In 1988, she played for Alberta at the Canadian Mixed Curling Championship, losing in the final. She has been in seven Scotties Tournament of Hearts (1995, 1997, 1998, 1999, 2002, 2005, and 2006). She won the 1998 Scott Tournament of Hearts, and then won a Bronze Medal at the subsequent World Championships behind Elisabet Gustafson's team from Sweden and Helena Blach Lavrsen's team from Denmark.

King won the 2005 Alberta Tournament of Hearts, defeating the defending champion Shannon Kleibrink rink in the final, 5–4. At the 2005 Scott Tournament of Hearts, she finished with a 6-5 round-robin record, then lost in a tie-breaker to Ontario's Jenn Hanna. In 2006, King won the Canada Cup of Curling defeating Jennifer Jones in the final. King won her second straight provincial title in 2006, defeating the Renée Sonnenberg rink in the final, 8–2. They sent King to the Tournament of Hearts in 2006, where she finished 6-5 again, and out of the playoffs. She has been part of three Olympic Curling Trials in 1997, 2001, 2005, and the pre-trials in 2009, but has never gone on to win.

King, along with Raylene Rocque retired from women's curling following the 2009-10 curling season. However, King returned the next season at the senior level. In her second season at the senior level, she represented Alberta at the 2012 Canadian Senior Curling Championships. She won the event, and became the first skip to win a Canadian Junior, Women's and Seniors championship in her career.

King was named to the Canadian Curling Hall of Fame in 2013. That year she also won the World Senior Curling Championship, going undefeated through the event. In addition her third Carolyn Morris became the first curler to win world championships for two different countries; she skipped Scotland to the senior women's title in 2005, one of four times she played for Scotland in the event before returning to Canada.

== Personal life ==
Cathy's partner was Bruce Saville, an Edmonton entrepreneur and philanthropist, for whom her club is named. She has 3 sons from her marriage to Henk Borst. Cathy's older brothers, Robbie and Chris, are former Canadian Junior Curling champions from the 1970s. She is a graduate of the Northern Alberta Institute of Technology.

== Grand Slam record ==
Key
C	Champion
F	Lost in Final
SF	Lost in Semifinal
QF	Lost in Quarterfinals
R16	Lost in the round of 16
Q	Did not advance to playoffs
T2	Played in Tier 2 event
DNP	Did not participate in event
N/A	Not a Grand Slam event that season

Event	2005–06	2006–07	2007–08	2008–09	2009–10
Players' Championships	SF	QF	QF	Q	Q

=== Former events ===
Event	2006–07	2007–08	2008–09	2009–10
Wayden Transportation	Q	QF	Q	N/A
Sobeys Slam	N/A	Q	SF	N/A
Autumn Gold	Q	Q	Q	SF
Manitoba Lotteries	DNP	QF	SF	Q
