= Curl Manitoba =

Curling organisation in Manitoba, Canada

CurlManitoba
- Sport: Curling
- Jurisdiction: provincial
- Membership: 93 curling clubs
- Founded: 2000 (Manitoba Curling Association) 1908 (MCA, men's only) 1888 (Royal Caledonian Curling Club, Manitoba Branch)
- Affiliation: Curling Canada
- Headquarters: Winnipeg
- Replaced: Manitoba Curling Association (men's only) and Manitoba Ladies Curling Association

Official website
- www.curlmanitoba.org
- (Canada)

Curl Manitoba or CurlManitoba (registered as the Manitoba Curling Association) is the provincial sport governing body for curling in Manitoba. Its stated mission is "to promote, develop and grow the sport of curling in Manitoba, Canada and the world by providing leadership, services and programs for the curling community from grassroots to elite."

== History ==
The origins of the current-day Curl Manitoba dates back to November 1888, when the Manitoba Branch of the Royal Caledonian Curling Club was established.

In 1908, the organization was renamed the Manitoba Curling Association (MCA), which was open to only men. In 1924, the women's-only Manitoba Ladies Curling Association (MCLA) was formed.

The MCA established the Manitoba Curling Hall of Fame & Museum in 1987 to "procure, preserve and promote the rich history of curling in Manitoba and to honour the outstanding accomplishments of curlers, builders, curler/builders and teams."

In 2000, the MCA and MCLA amalgamated to create the unisex Manitoba Curling Association.

In September 2009, the association adopted the new operating name Curl Manitoba along with a new logo. The brandmark of the new logo was created from the circle of a curling house, with the traditional outer ring being broken down into four parts, meant to represent the four members of a team.

== Provincial championships ==
- Bunge Championship (Men's)
- RME Women of the Rings (women's)
- Junior Men's (Under 20)
- Junior Women's
- Senior Men's (50+)
- Senior Women's
- Masters Men's (60+)
- Masters Women's
- Mixed
- Canadian Curling Club Championships (men's & women's)
- 8-Ender Youth Jamboree (Under 16; 4 divisions: boy's and girl's recreational and boy's and girl's championship)

== Manitoba Curling Hall of Fame & Museum ==
The Manitoba Curling Hall of Fame & Museum was created in 1987 to "procure, preserve and promote the rich history of curling in Manitoba and to honour the outstanding accomplishments of curlers, builders, curler/builders and teams."

The Manitoba Curling Museum collection includes an estimated 40,000 artifacts, documents, and historical images, and is "considered one of the most extensive curling collections in the world." Since the first induction ceremony in 1987, the Hall of Fame has honoured over 50 teams, 60 individual curlers, 40 builders of the sport, and 20 individuals who have a mix of credentials.

Manitoba Curling Hall of Fame inductees, 2013-2020
Inductee	Year	Category
Vic Peters	2020	Curler
Chris Neufeld	2020	Curler
Karen Purdy	2020	Curler
Ernie Oliver	2020	Builder
Resby Coutts	2020	Builder
Darcy Kirkness (Robertson)	2020	Team: 1984 Canadian Junior Champions
Barb Kirkness (Spencer)	2020	Team: 1984 Canadian Junior Champions
Janet Harvey	2020	Team: 1984 Canadian Junior Champions
Barb Fetch (Mehling)	2020	Team: 1984 Canadian Junior Champions
Jeff Stoughton	2020	Team: 2011 World Men's Champions
Jon Mead	2020	Team: 2011 World Men's Champions
Reid Carruthers	2020	Team: 2011 World Men's Champions
Steve Gould	2020	Team: 2011 World Men's Champions
Garry DeBlonde	2019	Curler/Builder
Isla Hagborg	2019	Builder
Kaitlyn Lawes	2019	Olympic Curler
Rob Meakin	2019	Curler/Builder
Karen Fallis	2019	Team: 1981 Canadian Junior Women’s Champions
Karen Tresoor	2019	Team: 1981 Canadian Junior Women’s Champions
Caroline Hunter	2019	Team: 1981 Canadian Junior Women’s Champions
Lynn Fallis	2019	Team: 1981 Canadian Junior Women’s Champions
Chris Pidzarko	2019	Team: 1974 Canadian Junior Women’s Champions
Cathy Pidzarko	2019	Team: 1974 Canadian Junior Women’s Champions
Patti Vande	2019	Team: 1974 Canadian Junior Women’s Champions
Barb Rudolph	2019	Team: 1974 Canadian Junior Women’s Champions
Cindy Maddock	2018	Builder
Peter Nicholls	2018	Curler
Jennifer Jones	2018	Curler
Jill Officer	2018	Curler
Norm Houck	2018	Team: 1987 Canadian Senior Champions
Henry Kroeger	2018	Team: 1987 Canadian Senior Champions
Sam Doherty	2018	Team: 1987 Canadian Senior Champions
Doug McCartney	2018	Team: 1987 Canadian Senior Champions
Hal Tanasichuk	2018	Team: 1977 Canadian Mixed Champions
Rose Tanasichuk	2018	Team: 1977 Canadian Mixed Champions
Jim Kirkness	2018	Team: 1977 Canadian Mixed Champions
Debbie Jones-Walker	2018	Team: 1977 Canadian Mixed Champions
Alex Mowat	2017	Builder
Edna June McTavish	2017	Builder
Linda Van Daele	2017	Curler
Dr. Bill McTavish	2017	Team: 1973 Canadian Senior Men’s Champions
Norm McLean	2017	Team: 1973 Canadian Senior Men’s Champions
John McLean	2017	Team: 1973 Canadian Senior Men’s Champions
Harry Sulkers	2017	Team: 1973 Canadian Senior Men’s Champions
Hugh McFadyen	2017	Team: 1986 Canadian Junior Men’s Champions
Jonathon Mead	2017	Team: 1986 Canadian Junior Men’s Champions
Norm Gould	2017	Team: 1986 Canadian Junior Men’s Champions
John Lange	2017	Team: 1986 Canadian Junior Men’s Champions
Braden Calvert	2017	Team: 2015 World Junior Men’s Champions
Kyle Kurz	2017	Team: 2015 World Junior Men’s Champions
Lucas Van Den Bosch	2017	Team: 2015 World Junior Men’s Champions
Brendan Wilson	2017	Team: 2015 World Junior Men’s Champions
Bob Boughey	2016	Curler/Builder
Karen Dunbar	2016	Curler
Audrey Hogg	2016	Builder
Ron Westcott	2016	Curler
Lois Fowler	2016	Team: 2015 Senior Women’s World Champions
Maureen Bonar	2016	Team: 2015 Senior Women’s World Champions
Cathy Gauthier	2016	Team: 2015 Senior Women’s World Champions
Allyson Stewart	2016	Team: 2015 Senior Women’s World Champions
Don Montgomery	2016	Team: 1947 Western Canada High School champs
Reg Freeman	2016	Team: 1947 Western Canada High School champs
Doug Kitson	2016	Team: 1947 Western Canada High School champs
Keith Sinclair	2016	Team: 1947 Western Canada High School champs
Stan Gowling	2016	Team: 1948 Western Canada High School champs
Stewart, Norman	2016	Team: 1948 Western Canada High School champs
Topley, Ross	2016	Team: 1948 Western Canada High School champs
Borthwick, Jack	2016	Team: 1948 Western Canada High School champs
Leo Johnson	2016	1965 Canadian Senior Men’s Champions
Marno Fredrickson	2016	1965 Canadian Senior Men’s Champions
Fred Smith	2016	1965 Canadian Senior Men’s Champions
Cliff Wise	2016	1965 Canadian Senior Men’s Champions
Jennifer Jones	2015	2014 Olympic Women’s Curling Champions
Kaitlyn Lawes	2015	2014 Olympic Women’s Curling Champions
Jill Officer	2015	2014 Olympic Women’s Curling Champions
Dawn McEwen	2015	2014 Olympic Women’s Curling Champions
Kirsten Wall	2015	2014 Olympic Women’s Curling Champions
Janet Arnott	2015	2014 Olympic Women’s Curling Champions
Arnold Asham	2015	Builder
Lorne Hamblin	2015	Builder
Tom Clasper	2015	Builder
Dennis Thiessen	2015	Curler
Mitchell Tarapasky	2014	Builder
Hans Wuthrich	2014	Builder
Steve Gould	2014	Curler
Barry Fry	2014	Men’s team 1979
Bill Carey	2014	Men’s team 1979
Gord Sparkes	2014	Men’s team 1979
Bryan Wood	2014	Men’s team 1979
Cathy Pidzarko	2014	Women’s team 1978
Chris Pidzarko	2014	Women’s team 1978
Iris Armstrong	2014	Women’s team 1978
Patti Vande	2014	Women’s team 1978
Paul Pelletier	2013	Builder
Terry Braunstein	2013	Men’s team 1965
Ron Braunstein	2013	Men’s team 1965
Don Duguid	2013	Men’s team 1965
Ray Turnbull	2013	Men’s team 1965
Barry Fry	2013	Mixed team 1973
Peggy Casselman	2013	Mixed team 1973
Stephen Decter	2013	Mixed team 1973
Susan Lynch	2013	Mixed team 1973
Ness and Cliff Wise	2013	Veteran Curlers
Jimmy Congalton	2013	Veteran team 1932
Harry Mawhinney	2013	Veteran team 1932
Bill Noble	2013	Veteran team 1932
Howard Wood, Sr.	2013	Veteran team 1932

== Honorary Life Members ==
Since 1907, Curl Manitoba and its preceding organizations have annually recognized four individuals who have "provided volunteer service to the game of curling" in Manitoba. Nearly 700 individuals have since been recognized by the organizations with Honorary Life Memberships.

2021-2022 Honorary Life Members:

- Ray Baker – Dauphin Curling Club
- Lance Wadelius – Beausejour CC
- Gail Cabana-Coldwell – Deer Lodge CC
- Joyce Wyrchowny – Stonewall CC

2020-2021 Honorary Life Members:

- Darren Oryniak – Granite CC
- Debbie Schween – Fort Rouge CC
- Wayne Griffin – Brandon CC

2019/2020 Honorary Life Members:

- Ian Staniloff – Granite CC
- Terry Peters – Altona CC
- Marj Bone – Deer Lodge CC
- Murray McLeod – Springfield CC

2018 Honorary Life Members:

- Danny Vande Vyvere – Pembina CC
- Matt Pilloud
- Jim MacGregor
- Hans Wuthrich

2017 Honorary Life Members:

- Wendell Keeler – Portage CC
- Catherine Moffat – Brandon CC
- Al Friesen – Altona CC
- Rita VandeVyvre – Heather CC

2016 Honorary Life Members:

- Sam Antila – Burntwood CC
- Kim Warburton – Fort Rouge CC
- Russ Hinds – Charleswood CC

2015 Honorary Life Members:

- John Graham – Safeway/Sobeys (presented at Safeway Championship in Brandon)
- Hilda Towerzey – Piper
- Paul Wiecek – Winnipeg Free Press
- Rob Van Kommer – Carberry CC

2014 Honorary Life Members:

- Jim Winfield – Grandview CC
- Sharon Thiessen Woods – Heather CC
- Anni Markmann – Ste Anne CC

2013 Honorary Life Members:

- Bev Harris
- Terry Leitch
- Mel Marsh

== See also ==
- List of curling clubs in Manitoba
