= RME Women of the Rings =

Curling tournament in Canada

- Established: 1952
- 2026 host city: Rivers
- 2026 arena: Riverdale Community Centre
- 2026 champion: Kelsey Calvert

Current edition
- 2026 RME Women of the Rings

The RME Women of the Rings, formerly the Manitoba Scotties Tournament of Hearts is the Manitoba provincial women's curling tournament. The tournament is run by Curl Manitoba, the provincial curling association. The winning team represents Manitoba at the Scotties Tournament of Hearts.

== Event names ==
- Eaton's Championship (1952–1960)
- Silver D Championship (1961–1967)
- Rose Bowl (1968–1972)
- Manitoba Lassie (1973–1981)
- Manitoba Scott Tournament of Hearts (1982–2006)
- Manitoba Scotties Tournament of Hearts (2007–2024)
- RME Women of the Rings (2025–present)

== Past winners ==
National champions in bold. Western Canada champions (1953–1960) in italics.

Year	Team	Curling club
1952	Isabelle Ketchen, Dot Ash, Joy Longmore, Ruby Evans	Flin Flon Curling Club
1953	Gladys Dick, Muriel Wolstenholme, Mabel McKinnon, Sadie Pettapierce	Rapid City Curling Club
1954	Dorothy Sawyer, Kay Lazenby, Nora Campbell, Effie Johnson	Foxwarren Curling Club
1955	Ethel Wright, Norma McLean, Jean McKenzie, Philolmene Floch	Flin Flon Curling Club
1956	Lily Clark, Vic Painter, Helen Wishart, Diane Kitson	Portage Curling Club
1957	Lily Clark, Vic Painter, Helen Wishart, Diane Kitson	Portage Curling Club
1958	Esther Poulton, May Graham, Mary Chalmers, Dorothy Starr	Fort Rouge Curling Club
1959	Isabelle Ketchen, Doris McFarlane, Isabel Phillips, Ruth McConnell	Flin Flon Curling Club
1960	Isabelle Ketchen, Doris McFarlane, Isabel Phillips, Ruth McConnell	Flin Flon Curling Club
1961	Irene Parker, Shirley Winstone, Lola Grills, Olive Gamey	Stratchlair Curling Club
1962	Kay Hebert, Roberta Fahrner, Marg Moon, Gwen Frankhard	Charleswood Curling Club
1963	Irene Burton, Marj Parrott, Evelyn Boyd, Marg Storey	Bethany Curling Club
1964	Myrle McGregor, Isabelle Park, Helen Brechin, Norma Coles	Carman Curling Club
1965	**Peggy Casselman, Val Taylor, Pat McDonald, Pat Scott**	Wildewood Curling Club
1966	Joyce Beek, Ruth McMillan, Marg Davis, Gayle White	Dauphin Curling Club
1967	**Betty Duguid, Joan Ingram, Laurie Bradawaski, Dot Rose**	Fort Garry Business Girls Curling Club
1968	Mabel Mitchell, Shirley Bray, Mildred Murray, June Clark	Brandon Curling Club
1969	Pat Brunsdon, Joan Ingram, Laurie Bradawaski, Dot Rose	Fort Garry Business Girls Curling Club
1970	Glenda Buhr, Rose Taylor, Mary Robertson, Miriam Cook	Elmwood Curling Club
1971	Mabel Mitchell, Mildred Murray, Ev Bird, June Clark	Brandon Curling Club
1972	Audrey Williamson, Mabel Mitchell, Flo Yeo, Dru Dickens	Brandon Curling Club
1973	Joan Ingram, Laurie Bradawaski, Dot Rose, Jackie Tinney	Fort Garry Business Girls Curling Club
1974	Merline Darbyshire, Marjorie Marsh, Pat McCaughan, Susan Dahl	Portage Curling Club
1975	Joan Mogk, Jean Moffatt, Betty Devins, Karen Anderson	Souris Curling Club
1976	Joan Mogk, Jean Moffatt, Betty Devins, Karen Anderson	Souris Curling Club
1977	Dorothy McKenzie, Simone Rivard, Una Irvine, Heather Helston	Heather Curling Club
1978	**Cathy Pidzarko, Chris Pidzarko, Iris Armstrong, Patti Vande**	Stony Mountain Curling Club
1979	Christine Pidzarko, Rose Tanasichuk, Iris Armstrong, Patti Vande	Stony Mountain Curling Club
1980	Donna Brownridge, Patti Vande, Carolyn Hall, Connie Laliberte	East St. Paul Business Girls Curling Club
1981	Joan Ingram, Lorraine Byrnes, Elaine James	Deer Lodge Business Girls Curling Club
1982	Dot Rose, Lynne Andrews, Kim Crass, Shannon Burns	Deer Lodge Business Girls Curling Club
1983	Patti Vande, Carol Dunstone, Iris Armstrong, Maureen Bonar	Granite Business Girls Curling Club
1984	**Connie Laliberte, Chris More, Corinne Peters, Janet Arnott**	Fort Rouge Business Women's Curling Club
1985	Merline Darbyshire, Jacki Rintoul, Carolyn Darbyshire, Yvonne Beaudin	Portage Ladies Evening Curling Club
1986	Darcy Kirkness, Barb Kirkness, Barb Fetch, Faye Irwin	Deer Lodge Business Girls Curling Club
1987	Kathlie Ellwood, Cathy Treloar, Laurie Ellwood, Sandi Asham	Deer Lodge Business Girls Curling Club
1988	Marlene Cleutinx, Jacki Rintoul, Judy Cochrane, Lois Fast	Deer Lodge Business Girls Curling Club
1989	Chris More, Karen Purdy, Lori Zeller, Kristen Kuruluk	Fort Rouge Business Women's Curling Club
1990	Janet Harvey, Jennifer Ryan, Janine Sigurdson, Kim Overton	Fort Garry Business Girls Curling Club
1991	Kathie Allardyce, Cathy Overton, Laurie Ellwood, Jill Proctor	Deer Lodge Business Girls Curling Club
1992	**Connie Laliberte, Laurie Allen, Cathy Gauthier, Janet Arnott, Arlene MacLeod**	Fort Rouge Business Women's Curling Club
1993	Maureen Bonar, Lois Fowler, Allyson Bell, Rhonda Fowler	Brandon Ladies Curling Club
1994	Connie Laliberte, Karen Purdy, Cathy Gauthier, Janet Arnott	Fort Rouge Business Women's Curling Club
1995	**Connie Laliberte, Karen Purdy, (Note: Purdy injured herself after provincials, and was replaced on the team by Cathy Overton-Clapham for the remainder of the season.) Cathy Gauthier, Janet Arnott**	Fort Rouge Business Women's Curling Club
1996	Maureen Bonar, Gerri Cooke, Allyson Bell, Lois Fowler	Brandon Ladies Curling Club
1997	Janet Harvey, Debbie Jones-Walker, Carol Harvey, Alison Harvey	Valour Road Business Women's Curling Club
1998	Lois Fowler, Betty Couling, Sharon Fowler, Jocelyn Beever	Brandon Ladies Curling Club
1999	Connie Laliberte, Cathy Overton-Clapham, Debbie Jones-Walker, Janet Arnott	Fort Rouge Business Women's Curling Club
2000	Cathy Overton-Clapham, (Note: Overton-Clapham skipped the team to the provincial win, however at the national championship Connie Laliberte returned from maternity leave and took over as skip, with Overton-Clapham moving to third.) Jill Staub, Debbie Jones-Walker, Janet Arnott	Fort Rouge Business Women's Curling Club
2001	Karen Young, Jan Sandison, Tammy Radchenka, Alison Harvey	St. Vital Curling Club
2002	Jennifer Jones, Karen Porritt, Lynn Fallis-Kurz, Dana Allerton	St. Vital Curling Club
2003	Barb Spencer, Darcy Robertson, Barb Enright, Faye Unrau	Fort Rouge Curling Club
2004	Lois Fowler, Gerri Cooke, Maureen Bonar, Lana Hunter	Wheat City Curling Club
2005	**Jennifer Jones, Cathy Overton-Clapham, Jill Officer, Cathy Gauthier**	St. Vital Curling Club
2006	Janet Harvey, Jill Thurston, Cherie-Ann Loder, Carey Burgess	Fort Rouge Curling Club
2007	Jennifer Jones, Cathy Overton-Clapham, Jill Officer, Janet Arnott	St. Vital Curling Club
2008	**Jennifer Jones, Cathy Overton-Clapham, Jill Officer, Dawn Askin**	St. Vital Curling Club
2009	Barb Spencer, Darcy Robertson, Brette Richards, Barb Enright	Fort Rouge Curling Club
2010	Jill Thurston, Kristen Phillips, Leslie Wilson, Raunora Westcott	Deer Lodge Curling Club
2011	Cathy Overton-Clapham, Karen Fallis, Leslie Wilson, Raunora Westcott	Fort Rouge Curling Club
2012	Jennifer Jones, Kaitlyn Lawes, Jill Officer, Dawn Askin	St. Vital Curling Club
2013	Jennifer Jones, Kaitlyn Lawes, Jill Officer, Dawn Askin	St. Vital Curling Club
2014	Chelsea Carey, Kristy McDonald, Kristen Foster, Lindsay Titheridge	Fort Rouge Curling Club
2015	**Jennifer Jones, Kaitlyn Lawes, Jill Officer, Dawn McEwen**	St. Vital Curling Club
2016	Kerri Einarson, Selena Kaatz, Liz Fyfe, Kristin MacCuish	East St. Paul Curling Club
2017	Michelle Englot, Kate Cameron, Leslie Wilson-Westcott, Raunora Westcott	Granite Curling Club
2018	**Jennifer Jones, Kaitlyn Lawes, Jill Officer, Dawn McEwen**	St. Vital Curling Club
2019	Tracy Fleury, Selena Njegovan, Liz Fyfe, Kristin MacCuish	East St. Paul Curling Club
2020	**Kerri Einarson, Val Sweeting, Shannon Birchard, Briane Meilleur**	Gimli Curling Club
2021	Cancelled due to the COVID-19 pandemic in Manitoba. Team Jones (Jennifer Jones, Kaitlyn Lawes, Jocelyn Peterman, Lisa Weagle) named Team Manitoba at Scotties	
2022	Mackenzie Zacharias, Karlee Burgess, Emily Zacharias, Lauren Lenentine	Altona Curling Club
2023	Jennifer Jones, Karlee Burgess, Mackenzie Zacharias, Emily Zacharias, Lauren Lenentine	St. Vital Curling Club & Altona Curling Club
2024	Kaitlyn Lawes, Selena Njegovan, Jocelyn Peterman, Kristin MacCuish	Fort Rouge Curling Club
2025	Kate Cameron, Taylor McDonald, Allison Flaxey, Mackenzie Elias	Heather Curling Club
2026	Kelsey Calvert, Beth Peterson, Katherine Remillard, Melissa Gordon-Kurz	Assiniboine Memorial Curling Club

== Other Manitoba teams at the Hearts ==
Beginning in 1986, the national Tournament of Hearts champion automatically earned a berth for the following years' national championship as "Team Canada". The first Manitoba team to play as "Team Canada" at the Hearts was Connie Laliberte in 1993. A Wildcard entry was added in 2018, which was expanded to three entries in 2021. Two of these entries became prequalifying entries in 2024.

Hearts	Team name	Team members	Club
1993	Team Canada	Connie Laliberte, Laurie Allen, Cathy Gauthier, Janet Arnott	Fort Rouge
1996	Team Canada	Connie Laliberte, Cathy Overton-Clapham, Cathy Gauthier, Janet Arnott	Fort Rouge
2006	Team Canada	Jennifer Jones, Cathy Overton-Clapham, Jill Officer, Georgina Wheatcroft	St. Vital
2009	Team Canada	Jennifer Jones, Cathy Overton-Clapham, Jill Officer, Dawn Askin	St. Vital
2009	Team Canada	Jennifer Jones, Cathy Overton-Clapham, Jill Officer, Dawn Askin	St. Vital
2010	Team Canada	Jennifer Jones, Cathy Overton-Clapham, Jill Officer, Dawn Askin	St. Vital
2011	Team Canada	Jennifer Jones, Kaitlyn Lawes, Jill Officer, Dawn Askin	St. Vital
2016	Team Canada	Jennifer Jones, Kaitlyn Lawes, Jill Officer, Dawn McEwen	St. Vital
2018	Wildcard	Kerri Einarson, Selena Kaatz, Liz Fyfe, Kristin MacCuish	East St. Paul
2019	Team Canada	Jennifer Jones, Kaitlyn Lawes, Jocelyn Peterman, Dawn McEwen	St. Vital
2019	— (Note: Lost Wildcard Game)	Kerri Einarson, Val Sweeting, Shannon Birchard, Briane Meilleur	Gimli
2020	Wildcard	Jennifer Jones, Kaitlyn Lawes, Jocelyn Peterman, Dawn McEwen	St. Vital
2020	— (Note: Lost Wildcard Game)	Tracy Fleury, Selena Njegovan, Liz Fyfe, Kristin MacCuish	East St. Paul
2021	Team Canada	Kerri Einarson, Val Sweeting, Shannon Birchard, Briane Meilleur	Gimli
2021	Wild Card #1	Chelsea Carey, Selena Njegovan, Liz Fyfe, Kristin MacCuish	East St. Paul
2021	Wild Card #2	Mackenzie Zacharias, Karlee Burgess, Emily Zacharias, Lauren Lenentine	Altona
2021	Wild Card #3	Beth Peterson, Jenna Loder, Katherine Doerksen, Brittany Tran	Assiniboine Memorial
2022	Team Canada	Kerri Einarson, Val Sweeting, Shannon Birchard, Briane Meilleur	Gimli
2022	Wild Card #1	Tracy Fleury, Selena Njegovan, Liz Fyfe, Kristin MacCuish, Robyn Njegovan	East St. Paul
2023	Team Canada	Kerri Einarson, Val Sweeting, Shannon Birchard, Briane Harris	Gimli
2023	Wild Card #1	Kaitlyn Lawes, Laura Walker, Jocelyn Peterman, Kristin MacCuish	Fort Rouge
2023	Wild Card #3	Meghan Walter, Abby Ackland, Sara Oliver, Mackenzie Elias	East St. Paul
2024	Team Canada	Kerri Einarson, Val Sweeting, Shannon Birchard, Krysten Karwacki	Gimli
2024	Manitoba – Jones	Jennifer Jones, Karlee Burgess, Emily Zacharias, Lauren Lenentine	St. Vital & Altona
2024	Manitoba – Cameron	Kate Cameron, Meghan Walter, Kelsey Rocque, Mackenzie Elias	Granite
2025	Manitoba – Einarson	Kerri Einarson, Val Sweeting, Karlee Burgess, Krysten Karwacki	Gimli
2025	Manitoba – Lawes	Kaitlyn Lawes, Selena Njegovan, Jocelyn Peterman, Kristin MacCuish	Heather
2026	Canada	Kerri Einarson, Val Sweeting, Shannon Birchard, Karlee Burgess	Gimli
2026	Manitoba – Lawes	Kaitlyn Lawes, Selena Njegovan, Laura Walker, Kristin Gordon	Heather
