= 2009 Manitoba Scotties Tournament of Hearts =

- Host city: Neepawa, Manitoba
- Arena: Yellowhead Centre
- Dates: February 4–8
- Winner: Team Spencer
- Curling club: Fort Rouge CC, Winnipeg
- Skip: Barb Spencer
- Third: Darcy Robertson
- Second: Brette Richards
- Lead: Barb Enright
- Finalist: Karen Porritt

The 2009 Manitoba Scotties Tournament of Hearts—Manitoba's provincial women's curling championship—was held February 4–8, 2009, at the Yellowhead Centre in Neepawa.

The winning Barb Spencer team represented Manitoba at the 2009 Scotties Tournament of Hearts in Victoria, British Columbia. The reigning provincial champion, Jennifer Jones, won the 2008 Scotties Tournament of Hearts and thereby had already qualified for the 2009 event as Team Canada.

== Teams ==
=== Black Group ===
Skip	Vice	Second	Lead	Alternate	Club
Lisa Blixhaven	Jamie Campbell	Lana Hunter	Tanya Enns		Brandon Curling Club, Brandon
Chelsea Carey	Kari White	Kristen Foster	Lindsay Titheridge		Morden Curling Club, Morden
Kim Link	Colleen Kigallen	Pam Kolten	Renee Fletcher		East St. Paul Curling Club, Winnipeg
Charlene Norquay	Tami Bodnaryk	Lynn Lambert	Gail Kearney		Burntwood Curling Club, Thompson
Holly Scott	Tara Scott	Lisa DeRiviere	Jenna Scott		Fort Rouge Curling Club, Winnipeg
Barb Spencer	Darcy Robertson	Brette Richards	Barb Enright		Fort Rouge Curling Club, Winnipeg
Linda Stewart	Jan Sandison	Tamy Schoenrath	Jodi Proctor	Ally Stewart	Bowsman Curling Club, Bowsman
Angela Wickman	Vanessa Foster	Heather Benci	Roxie Trembath	Heather Grasby	Rossmere Curling Club, Winnipeg

=== Red Group ===
Skip	Vice	Second	Lead	Alternate	Club
Maureen Bonar	Nancy Smith	Rhonda Ritchie	Dana Allerton		Wheat City Curling Club, Brandon
Janet Harvey	Cherie-Ann Loder	Kristin Loder	Carey Kirby		Assiniboine Memorial CC, Winnipeg
Kristy Jenion	Karen Klein	Theresa Cannon	Jillian Sandison		Fort Rouge Curling Club, Winnipeg
Tina Kozak	Kortney Teale	Pam Robins	Krystal Stewart		Brandon Curling Club, Brandon
Karen Porritt	Janice Blair	Susan Baleja	Alison Harvey		Fort Rouge Curling Club, Winnipeg
Karen Rosser	Cheryl Reed	Sam Owen	Lindsay Edie		Springfield Curling Club, Dugald
Lori Pelissier	Deb McCreanor	Nickie McKim	Chris Scalena*		La Salle Curling Club, La Salle
Terry Ursel	Sandra Pottinger	Jennifer Meloney	Brenda Walker		Plumas Curling Club, Plumas

* Scalena skips and throws lead stones

== Standings ==
=== Black Group ===
Skip (Club)	W	L
Barb Spencer (Fort Rouge)	6	1
Chelsea Carey (Morden)	6	1
Holly Scott (Fort Rouge)	5	2
Lisa Blixhaven (Brandon)	5	2
Kim Link (East St. Paul)	3	4
Linda Stewart (Bowsman)	2	5
Angela Wickman (Rossmere)	1	6
Charlene Norquay (Burntwood)	0	7

=== Red Group ===
Skip (Club)	W	L
Kristy Jenion (Fort Rouge)	7	0
Karen Porritt (Fort Rouge)	6	1
Janet Harvey (Assiniboine Memorial)	4	3
Tina Kozak (Brandon)	4	3
Maureen Bonar (Wheat City)	3	4
Terry Ursel (Plumas)	2	5
Chris Scalena (La Salle)	1	6
Karen Rosser (Springfield)	1	6

== Results ==
=== Draw 1 ===
February 4, 0830

Sheet A	1	2	3	4	5	6	7	8	9	10	Final
Holly Scott	1	1	2	0	3	0	2	1	X	X	10
Charlene Norquay	0	0	0	3	0	1	0	0	X	X	4

Sheet B	1	2	3	4	5	6	7	8	9	10	Final
Chelsea Carey	0	0	2	0	2	0	0	0	1	1	6
Linda Stewart	1	1	0	0	0	1	1	0	0	0	4

Sheet C	1	2	3	4	5	6	7	8	9	10	Final
Angela Wickman	0	0	0	0	0	1	0	X	X	X	1
Barb Spencer	3	0	0	2	0	0	3	X	X	X	8

Sheet D	1	2	3	4	5	6	7	8	9	10	Final
Lisa Blixhaven	0	2	0	1	0	1	0	0	0	2	6
Kim Link	1	0	1	0	1	0	0	2	0	0	5

=== Draw 2 ===
February 4, 1215

Sheet A	1	2	3	4	5	6	7	8	9	10	Final
Maureen Bonar	0	1	1	0	2	0	0	0	0	4	8
Chris Scalena	0	0	0	3	0	0	0	0	1	0	4

Sheet B	1	2	3	4	5	6	7	8	9	10	Final
Janet Harvey	2	0	1	0	1	0	3	1	X	X	8
Karen Rosser	0	1	0	1	0	1	0	0	X	X	3

Sheet C	1	2	3	4	5	6	7	8	9	10	Final
Tina Kozak	0	0	1	0	2	0	0	0	1	0	4
Kristy Jenion	0	0	0	2	0	2	0	0	0	1	5

Sheet D	1	2	3	4	5	6	7	8	9	10	Final
Terry Ursel	0	0	1	1	0	0	1	0	2	X	5
Karen Porritt	0	3	0	0	0	1	0	3	0	X	7

=== Draw 3 ===
February 4, 1600

Sheet A	1	2	3	4	5	6	7	8	9	10	Final
Linda Stewart	0	0	1	0	1	0	0	X	X	X	2
Barb Spencer	1	3	0	1	0	1	3	X	X	X	9

Sheet B	1	2	3	4	5	6	7	8	9	10	Final
Holly Scott	2	0	5	0	0	1	0	1	0	X	9
Lisa Blixhaven	0	1	0	1	1	0	1	0	2	X	6

Sheet C	1	2	3	4	5	6	7	8	9	10	Final
Charlene Norquay	1	0	0	0	1	0	1	X	X	X	3
Kim Link	0	3	1	1	0	3	0	X	X	X	8

Sheet D	1	2	3	4	5	6	7	8	9	10	Final
Angela Wickman	1	0	0	1	0	0	0	X	X	X	2
Chelsea Carey	0	2	1	0	2	0	3	X	X	X	8

=== Draw 4 ===
February 4, 2000

Sheet A	1	2	3	4	5	6	7	8	9	10	Final
Karen Rosser	0	2	0	1	0	0	0	0	X	X	3
Kristy Jenion	0	0	1	0	2	2	2	2	X	X	9

Sheet B	1	2	3	4	5	6	7	8	9	10	Final
Maureen Bonar	0	1	0	0	0	1	0	1	0	1	4
Terry Ursel	0	0	1	0	1	0	2	0	1	0	5

Sheet C	1	2	3	4	5	6	7	8	9	10	Final
Chris Scalena	1	0	1	0	0	0	0	X	X	X	2
Karen Porritt	0	3	0	2	1	1	1	X	X	X	8

Sheet D	1	2	3	4	5	6	7	8	9	10	Final
Tina Kozak	1	0	0	1	0	0	0	0	0	0	2
Janet Harvey	0	1	2	0	1	0	0	0	0	1	5

=== Draw 5 ===
February 5, 0830

Sheet A	1	2	3	4	5	6	7	8	9	10	Final
Chelsea Carey	1	3	0	2	2	1	X	X	X	X	9
Liza Blixhaven	0	0	3	0	0	0	X	X	X	X	3

Sheet B	1	2	3	4	5	6	7	8	9	10	Final
Kim Link	0	2	0	0	2	0	0	1	1	X	6
Angela Wickman	1	0	1	0	0	1	0	0	0	X	3

Sheet C	1	2	3	4	5	6	7	8	9	10	Final
Holly Scott	1	1	0	0	1	0	3	1	0	X	7
Linda Stewart	0	0	2	1	0	0	0	0	2	X	5

Sheet D	1	2	3	4	5	6	7	8	9	10	Final
Charlene Norquay	0	0	0	0	0	0	0	1	X	X	1
Barb Spencer	1	1	1	1	0	2	2	0	X	X	8

=== Draw 6 ===
February 5, 1215

Sheet A	1	2	3	4	5	6	7	8	9	10	Final
Janet Harvey	4	0	3	0	2	0	0	2	0	X	11
Terry Ursel	0	1	0	1	0	2	1	0	1	X	6

Sheet B	1	2	3	4	5	6	7	8	9	10	Final
Karen Porritt	2	0	4	0	2	0	1	0	0	X	9
Tina Kozak	0	1	0	2	0	2	0	0	2	X	7

Sheet C	1	2	3	4	5	6	7	8	9	10	Final
Maureen Bonar	2	0	3	1	0	1	0	3	X	X	10
Karen Rosser	0	1	0	0	2	0	1	0	X	X	4

Sheet D	1	2	3	4	5	6	7	8	9	10	Final
Chris Scalena	0	0	0	0	1	0	3	0	X	X	4
Kristy Jenion	1	2	1	1	0	2	0	2	X	X	9

=== Draw 7 ===
February 5, 1600

Sheet A	1	2	3	4	5	6	7	8	9	10	Final
Angela Wickman	0	0	1	0	0	2	0	X	X	X	3
Holly Scott	0	1	0	1	4	0	3	X	X	X	9

Sheet B	1	2	3	4	5	6	7	8	9	10	Final
Barb Spencer	0	2	0	1	0	3	0	0	0	0	6
Lisa Blixhaven	1	0	1	0	1	0	2	1	1	3	10

Sheet C	1	2	3	4	5	6	7	8	9	10	Final
Charlene Norquay	0	0	0	0	0	X	X	X	X	X	0
Chelsea Carey	2	2	2	4	1	X	X	X	X	X	11

Sheet D	1	2	3	4	5	6	7	8	9	10	Final
Kim Link	2	0	0	0	2	0	0	4	0	1	9
Linda Stewart	0	0	1	2	0	1	1	0	2	0	7

=== Draw 8 ===
February 5, 1945

Sheet A	1	2	3	4	5	6	7	8	9	10	Final
Tina Kozak	0	0	2	0	3	0	1	0	0	1	7
Maureen Bonar	0	0	0	1	0	3	0	0	2	0	6

Sheet B	1	2	3	4	5	6	7	8	9	10	Final
Kristy Jenion	3	0	1	0	2	0	1	1	0	X	8
Terry Ursel	0	1	0	1	0	1	0	0	1	X	4

Sheet C	1	2	3	4	5	6	7	8	9	10	Final
Chris Scalena	1	0	0	0	3	1	0	0	1	0	6
Janet Harvey	0	2	1	1	0	0	2	1	0	2	9

Sheet D	1	2	3	4	5	6	7	8	9	10	Final
Karen Porritt	0	1	1	1	0	0	2	0	2	X	7
Karen Rosser	1	0	0	0	1	0	0	1	0	X	3

=== Draw 9 ===
February 6, 0830

Sheet A	1	2	3	4	5	6	7	8	9	10	Final
Janet Harvey	0	0	0	0	0	0	1	1	0	X	2
Karen Porritt	1	0	1	2	0	2	0	0	1	X	7

Sheet B	1	2	3	4	5	6	7	8	9	10	Final
Karen Rosser	1	1	0	0	0	0	0	0	1	X	3
Chris Scalena	0	0	1	1	0	0	1	3	0	X	6

Sheet C	1	2	3	4	5	6	7	8	9	10	Final
Terry Ursel	2	0	1	0	0	1	1	0	0	0	5
Tina Kozak	0	2	0	2	1	0	0	1	0	1	7

Sheet D	1	2	3	4	5	6	7	8	9	10	11	Final
Maureen Bonar	1	0	0	0	0	2	0	1	0	0	0	4
Kristy Jenion	0	0	1	1	0	0	1	0	0	1	1	5

=== Draw 10 ===
February 6, 1215

Sheet A	1	2	3	4	5	6	7	8	9	10	Final
Chelsea Carey	0	0	0	1	0	1	2	0	2	X	5
Kim Link	0	0	0	0	0	0	0	2	0	X	2

Sheet B	1	2	3	4	5	6	7	8	9	10	Final
Linda Stewart	5	0	3	0	0	3	X	X	X	X	11
Charlene Norquay	0	1	0	1	1	0	X	X	X	X	3

Sheet C	1	2	3	4	5	6	7	8	9	10	Final
Lisa Blixhaven	3	0	0	1	0	1	0	0	3	X	8
Angela Wickman	0	1	0	0	1	0	1	1	0	X	4

Sheet D	1	2	3	4	5	6	7	8	9	10	Final
Holly Scott	0	2	0	1	0	0	1	1	0	X	5
Barb Spencer	1	0	1	0	3	0	0	0	3	X	8

=== Draw 11 ===
February 6, 1600

Sheet A	1	2	3	4	5	6	7	8	9	10	Final
Karen Rosser	0	1	0	0	2	1	0	0	2	0	6
Tina Kozak	1	0	0	2	0	0	0	3	0	1	7

Sheet B	1	2	3	4	5	6	7	8	9	10	Final
Karen Porritt	2	0	2	0	2	0	1	0	0	1	8
Maureen Bonar	0	2	0	1	0	0	0	2	1	0	6

Sheet C	1	2	3	4	5	6	7	8	9	10	Final
Kristy Jenion	2	0	1	0	0	3	0	2	X	X	8
Janet Harvey	0	0	0	1	1	0	1	0	X	X	3

Sheet D	1	2	3	4	5	6	7	8	9	10	Final
Terry Ursel	2	0	0	0	0	2	0	1	0	2	7
Chris Scalena	0	2	1	0	0	0	1	0	2	0	6

=== Draw 12 ===
February 6, 1945

Sheet A	1	2	3	4	5	6	7	8	9	10	Final
Linda Stewart	0	0	2	1	1	0	2	2	0	X	8
Angela Wickman	1	1	0	0	0	2	0	0	1	X	5

Sheet B	1	2	3	4	5	6	7	8	9	10	11	Final
Kim Link	0	2	0	0	0	2	0	2	0	2	0	8
Holly Scott	1	0	1	0	1	0	1	0	4	0	1	9

Sheet C	1	2	3	4	5	6	7	8	9	10	Final
Barb Spencer	0	1	0	0	1	1	0	0	0	1	4
Chelsea Carey	1	0	1	0	0	0	0	0	0	0	2

Sheet D	1	2	3	4	5	6	7	8	9	10	Final
Lisa Blixhaven	5	0	2	1	2	X	X	X	X	X	10
Charlene Norquay	0	2	0	0	0	X	X	X	X	X	2

=== Draw 13 ===
February 7, 0830

Sheet A	1	2	3	4	5	6	7	8	9	10	Final
Kristy Jenion	0	0	3	0	0	0	1	0	0	3	7
Karen Porritt	1	0	0	0	2	0	0	1	0	0	4

Sheet B	1	2	3	4	5	6	7	8	9	10	Final
Tina Kozak	2	0	2	0	1	X	X	X	X	X	5
Chris Scalena	0	1	0	1	0	X	X	X	X	X	2

Sheet C	1	2	3	4	5	6	7	8	9	10	Final
Terry Ursel	1	1	0	1	0	2	0	0	2	X	7
Karen Rosser	0	0	2	0	3	0	0	3	0	X	8

Sheet D	1	2	3	4	5	6	7	8	9	10	Final
Janet Harvey	1	0	0	0	0	X	X	X	X	X	1
Maureen Bonar	0	3	1	0	4	X	X	X	X	X	8

=== Draw 14 ===
February 7, 1215

Sheet A	1	2	3	4	5	6	7	8	9	10	Final
Barb Spencer	1	0	2	2	0	4	X	X	X	X	9
Kim Link	0	2	0	0	1	0	X	X	X	X	3

Sheet B	1	2	3	4	5	6	7	8	9	10	Final
Angela Wickman	1	0	1	1	0	0	3	0	2	X	8
Charlene Norquay	0	1	0	0	1	1	0	1	0	X	4

Sheet C	1	2	3	4	5	6	7	8	9	10	Final
Lisa Blixhaven	0	0	3	0	2	1	5	X	X	X	11
Linda Stewart	0	0	0	1	0	0	0	X	X	X	1

Sheet D	1	2	3	4	5	6	7	8	9	10	Final
Chelsea Carey	0	1	2	0	3	0	1	0	3	X	10
Holly Scott	0	0	0	2	0	0	0	1	0	X	3

== Playoffs ==
Page playoff system
R1	Kristy Jenion	3
B1	Barb Spencer	4
R2	Karen Porritt	9
B2	Chelsea Carey	5

Semifinal
R1	Kristy Jenion	3
R2	Karen Porritt	9

Final
B1	Barb Spencer	10
R2	Karen Porritt	7

=== R1 vs. B1 ===
February 7, 1900

Team	1	2	3	4	5	6	7	8	9	10	Final
Kristy Jenion	0	0	1	0	0	0	1	0	1	0	3
Barb Spencer	1	0	0	0	1	0	0	1	0	1	4

=== R2 vs. B2 ===
February 7, 1900

Team	1	2	3	4	5	6	7	8	9	10	Final
Karen Porritt	0	1	0	2	0	1	0	2	1	2	9
Chelsea Carey	0	0	1	0	2	0	2	0	0	0	5

=== Semifinal ===
February 8, 0930

Team	1	2	3	4	5	6	7	8	9	10	Final
Karen Porritt	0	0	4	0	2	0	3	X	X	X	9
Kristy Jenion	0	1	0	1	0	1	0	X	X	X	3

=== Final ===
February 8, 1400

Team	1	2	3	4	5	6	7	8	9	10	Final
Karen Porritt	0	0	0	2	0	2	0	2	1	0	7
Barb Spencer	0	0	2	0	2	0	2	0	0	4	10
