= List of curling clubs in Manitoba =

Curling clubs in Manitoba are organized by CurlManitoba (formerly the Manitoba Curling Association) into 5 different sport regions: North, West, South, East, and Winnipeg, with the West and South regions having two divisions within the larger region.

== Winnipeg ==
- Assiniboine Memorial Curling Club
- Charleswood Curling Club
- Deer Lodge Curling Club
- Elmwood Curling Club
- Fort Garry Curling Club
- Fort Rouge Curling Club
- Grain Exchange Curling Club*
- Granite Curling Club
- Heather Curling Club
- Pembina Curling Club
- Rossmere Golf and Country Club*
- St. Vital Curling Club
- Thistle Curling Club
- Valour Road Curling Club*
- Victoria Curling Club*
- West Kildonan Curling Club*
- West St. Paul Curling Club (in West St. Paul)
- Wildewood Curling Club*

* and italics indicates inactive or closed clubs.

== North ==
Curling clubs in Northern Manitoba (Zone 1) include:

- Burntwood Curling Club Thompson
- Flin Flon Curling Club - Flin Flon (Uptown Curling Rink)
- Gillam Curling Club - Gillam
- Snow Lake Curling Club - Snow Lake
- The Pas Curling Club - The Pas
- Willow Park Curling Club - Flin Flon

== West ==
CurlManitoba divides the Westman sport region into divisions: West 1 and West 2.

=== West 1 ===
Curling clubs in West 1 (Parkland Region in upper Westman) include:

- Dauphin Curling Club - Dauphin
- Gilbert Plains Curling Club - Gilbert Plains
- Gladstone Curling Club - Gladstone
- Grandview Curling Club - Grandview
- Hamiota Curling Club - Hamiota
- Lansdowne/Arden Curling Club - Glenella
- Miniota Curling Club - Miniota
- Minnedosa Curling Club - Minnedosa
- Neepawa Curling Club - Neepawa
- Newdale Curling Club - Newdale
- Plumas Curling Club - Plumas (not included in CurlManitoba's 2023/24 region list)
- Roblin Curling Club - Roblin (not included in CurlManitoba's 2023/24 region list)
- Rorketon Curling Club - Rorketon
- Shoal Lake Curling Club - Shoal Lake
- Ste. Rose Curling Club - Ste. Rose (not included in CurlManitoba's 2023/24 region list)
- Swan River Curling Club - Swan River
- Winnipegosis Curling Club - Winnipegosis
- Wawanesa Curling Club - Wawanesa

=== West 2 ===
Curling clubs in the West 2 (lower Westman) include:

- Cypress River Curling Club* - Cypress River
- Boissevain Curling Club - Boissevain
- Brandon Curling Club - Brandon
- Brookdale Curling Club - Brookdale
- Carberry Curling Club - Carberry
- Deloraine Curling Club - Deloraine
- Glenboro Curling Club - Glenboro
- Glenora Curling Club - Glenora (RM of Argyle)
- Killarney Curling Club - Killarney
- Kenton Curling Club - Kenton (not included in CurlManitoba's 2023/24 region list)
- Melita Curling Club - Melita
- Rivers Curling Club - Rivers
- Riverview Curling Club - Brandon
- Souris Curling Club - Souris
- Virden Curling Club - Virden
- Waskada Curling Club - Waskada
- Wheat City Curling Club* - Brandon

* and italics indicates inactive or closed clubs.

== South ==
The South sport region includes the Central Plains and Pembina Valley regions of Manitoba, as well as parts of Eastman. CurlManitoba divides the South region into divisions: South 1 and South 2.

=== South 1 ===
- Baldur Curling Club - Baldur
- Carman Curling Club - Carman
- Cartwright Curling Club - Cartwright
- Clearwater Curling Club - Clearwater
- Holland Curling Club - Holland
- Manitou Curling Club - Manitou
- Miami Curling Club - Miami
- Morden Curling Club - Morden
- Oakville Curling Club - Oakville
- Pilot Mound Curling Club - Pilot Mound
- Portage Curling Club - Portage la Prairie
- Roland Curling Club - Roland
- Somerset Curling Club - Somerset
- St. Leon Curling Club - St. Leon
- Swan Lake Curling Club - Swan Lake
- Treherne Curling Club - Treherne
- Winkler Curling Club - Winkler

=== South 2 ===
- Altona Curling Club - Altona
- La Salle Curling Club - La Salle
- Lorette Curling Club - Lorette
- Morris Curling Club - Morris
- St. Adolphe Curling Club - St. Adolphe
- Ste. Anne Curling Club - Ste. Anne
- Steinbach Curling Club - Steinbach

=== Others ===
Existing clubs in the area that are not included in CurlManitoba's 2023/24 region list:

- Altamont Curling Club - Altamont
- Argyle Curling Club - Argyle
- Bissett Curling Club - Bissett
- Dufrost Curling Club - Dufrost
- Elm Creek Curling Club - Elm Creek
- Emerson Curling Club - Emerson
- Grand Marais Curling Club - Grand Marais
- Halbstadt Curling Club - Halbstadt
- Northern Interlake Curling Club - St. Martin
- Rosser Curling Club - Rosser
- St. Claude Curling Club - St. Claude
- St. Jean Curling Club - St. Jean Baptiste
- Starbuck Curling Club - Starbuck
- Stony Mountain Curling Club - Stony Mountain
- Tyndall Curling Club - Tyndall
- Warren Curling Club - Warren

== East ==
The East sport region includes most of Eastern Manitoba.

- Arborg Curling Club - Arborg
- Balmoral Curling Club - Balmoral
- Beausejour Curling Club - Beausejour
- East St. Paul Curling Club - East St. Paul
- Eriksdale Curling Club - Eriksdale
- Fisher Branch Curling Club - Fisher Branch
- Gimli Curling Club - Gimli
- Lac du Bonnet Curling Club - Lac du Bonnet
- Moosehorn Curling Club - Moosehorn
- Petersfield Curling Club - Petersfield
- Pinawa Curling Club - Pinawa
- Pine Falls Curling Club - Pine Falls
- Riverton Curling Club - Riverton
- Selkirk Curling Club - Selkirk
- Springfield Curling Club - Dugald
- Stonewall Curling Club - Stonewall
- Teulon Curling Club - Teulon
- Victoria Beach Curling Club - Victoria Beach
- Whiteshell Curling Club - Falcon Lake
- Winnipeg Beach Curling Club - Winnipeg Beach
