= 2015 Manitoba Scotties Tournament of Hearts =

- Host city: Winkler, Manitoba
- Arena: Winkler Centennial Arena
- Dates: January 21–25
- Winner: Team Jones
- Curling club: St. Vital CC, Winnipeg
- Skip: Jennifer Jones
- Third: Kaitlyn Lawes
- Second: Jill Officer
- Lead: Dawn McEwen
- Finalist: Kerri Einarson

The 2015 Manitoba Scotties Tournament of Hearts, the provincial women's curling championship of Manitoba, was held from January 21 to 25 at the Winkler Centennial Arena in Winkler, Manitoba. The winning team was the Jennifer Jones rink from Winnipeg, the defending Olympic champions. They went on to represent Manitoba at the 2015 Scotties Tournament of Hearts in Moose Jaw, Saskatchewan.

== Teams ==
The teams are listed as follows:

Skip	Third	Second	Lead	Alternate	Club(s)
Kelly Wiwcharuk	Jenna Wiwcharuk-Roy	Janelle Grant	Toni Butt		Snow Lake Curling Club, Snow Lake
Tiffany McLean	Heather Bruederlin	Blaire Rempel	Cassandra Lesiuk	Morgan Hrychuk	Dauphin Curling Club, Dauphin
Tina Kozak	Janelle Schwindt	Quinn Roberts	Caryn Edwards	Pam Robins	Neepawa Curling Club, Neepawa
Stacey Fordyce	Kelsey Russill	Kristy Howard	Roz Ripley	Jolene Cumming	Brandon Curling Club, Brandon
Kaileigh Strath	Sabrina Neufeld	Calleen Friesen	D'Arcy Maywood	Shea Maywood	Winkler Curling Club, Winkler
Colleen Kilgallen	Susan Baleja	Janice Blair	Kendra Georges	Cindy Wainikka	Roland Curling Club, Roland
Kerri Einarson	Selena Kaatz	Liz Fyfe	Kristin MacCuish	Jennifer Clark-Rouire	East St. Paul Curling Club, East St. Paul
Darcy Robertson	Tracey Lavery	Vanessa Foster	Michelle Kruk		Fort Rouge Curling Club, Winnipeg
Joelle Brown	Alyssa Vandepoele	Heather Maxted	Kelsey Hinds	Kelsey Boettcher	Assiniboine Memorial Curling Club, Winnipeg
Michelle Montford	Lisa Deriviere	Sara Van Walleghem	Sarah Neufeld	Courtney Blanchard	Assiniboine Memorial Curling Club, Winnipeg
Barb Spencer	Katie Spencer	Holly Spencer	Sydney Arnal		Assiniboine Memorial Curling Club, Winnipeg
Jennifer Jones	Kaitlyn Lawes	Jill Officer	Dawn McEwen		St. Vital Curling Club, Winnipeg
Jill Thurston	Brette Richards	Briane Meilleur	Krysten Karwacki	Blaine de Jager	Granite Curling Club, Winnipeg
Kristy McDonald	Kate Cameron	Leslie Wilson	Raunora Westcott	Lisa Blixhavn	Granite Curling Club, Winnipeg
Janet Harvey	Cherie-Ann Sheppard	Kristin Napier	Carey Kirby		Assiniboine Memorial Curling Club, Winnipeg
Terry Ursel	Wanda Rainka	Lisa Davie	Darla Hanke	Tracy Igonia	Lansdowne Curling Club, Lansdowne

== Round-robin standings ==
Final round-robin standings

Key
Teams to Playoffs
Teams to Tiebreaker

Black Group	W	L
Jennifer Jones	7	0
Barb Spencer	6	1
Michelle Montford	4	3
Darcy Robertson	4	3
Colleen Kilgallen	3	4
Terry Ursel	3	4
Stacey Fordyce	1	6
Kelly Wiwcharuk	0	7

Red Group	W	L
Kerri Einarson	7	0
Joelle Brown	5	2
Kristy McDonald	5	2
Kaileigh Strath	4	3
Jill Thurston	4	3
Tina Kozak	2	5
Janet Harvey	1	6
Tiffany McLean	0	7

== Round-robin results ==
All draw times are listed in Central Standard Time (UTC−6).

=== Draw 1 ===
Wednesday, January 21, 8:30 am

Sheet A	1	2	3	4	5	6	7	8	9	10	Final
Darcy Robertson 🔨	3	0	3	0	0	1	5	X	X	X	12
Kelly Wiwcharuk	0	1	0	0	1	0	0	X	X	X	2

Sheet B	1	2	3	4	5	6	7	8	9	10	Final
Barb Spencer	0	0	0	2	0	3	0	3	X	X	8
Stacey Fordyce	0	0	0	0	2	0	1	0	X	X	3

Sheet C	1	2	3	4	5	6	7	8	9	10	Final
Terry Ursel	0	1	0	0	0	2	0	1	0	X	4
Jennifer Jones 🔨	1	0	1	4	0	0	0	0	1	X	7

Sheet D	1	2	3	4	5	6	7	8	9	10	Final
Colleen Kilgallen 🔨	1	0	1	0	0	0	1	0	2	X	5
Michelle Montford	0	1	0	3	1	0	0	3	0	X	8

=== Draw 2 ===
Wednesday, January 21, 12:15 pm

Sheet A	1	2	3	4	5	6	7	8	9	10	Final
Kerri Einarson 🔨	1	0	0	2	0	5	8	X	X	X	16
Tiffany McLean	0	1	1	0	1	0	0	X	X	X	3

Sheet B	1	2	3	4	5	6	7	8	9	10	Final
Kristy McDonald	0	2	0	0	0	1	3	0	2	1	9
Kaileight Strath 🔨	1	0	0	2	1	0	0	2	0	0	6

Sheet C	1	2	3	4	5	6	7	8	9	10	Final
Tina Kozak	0	2	0	0	1	0	1	0	X	X	4
Jill Thurston 🔨	2	0	3	1	0	1	0	2	X	X	9

Sheet D	1	2	3	4	5	6	7	8	9	10	Final
Joelle Brown	0	0	0	2	1	0	3	1	0	X	7
Janet Harvey 🔨	0	0	1	0	0	3	0	0	1	X	5

=== Draw 3 ===
Wednesday, January 21, 4:00 pm

Sheet A	1	2	3	4	5	6	7	8	9	10	Final
Stacey Fordyce	0	0	1	0	1	0	1	0	X	X	3
Jennifer Jones 🔨	2	1	0	1	0	1	0	5	X	X	10

Sheet B	1	2	3	4	5	6	7	8	9	10	Final
Darcy Robertson	0	0	1	0	0	1	0	1	1	1	5
Colleen Kilgallen 🔨	1	0	0	1	1	0	0	0	0	0	3

Sheet C	1	2	3	4	5	6	7	8	9	10	Final
Kelly Wiwcharuk	0	0	1	0	0	1	0	X	X	X	2
Michelle Montford 🔨	2	3	0	0	2	0	2	X	X	X	9

Sheet D	1	2	3	4	5	6	7	8	9	10	Final
Terry Ursel	0	1	0	2	0	2	0	0	X	X	5
Barb Spencer 🔨	3	0	3	0	3	0	2	1	X	X	12

=== Draw 4 ===
Wednesday, January 21, 8:15 pm

Sheet A	1	2	3	4	5	6	7	8	9	10	Final
Kaileigh Strath 🔨	2	0	0	1	0	1	0	1	1	0	6
Jill Thurston	0	2	1	0	3	0	1	0	0	1	8

Sheet B	1	2	3	4	5	6	7	8	9	10	Final
Kerri Einarson 🔨	2	2	0	5	1	X	X	X	X	X	10
Joelle Brown	0	0	1	0	0	X	X	X	X	X	1

Sheet C	1	2	3	4	5	6	7	8	9	10	Final
Tiffany McLean	0	0	2	0	0	0	1	0	X	X	3
Janet Harvey 🔨	2	1	0	2	2	1	0	1	X	X	9

Sheet D	1	2	3	4	5	6	7	8	9	10	Final
Tina Kozak	0	0	0	1	0	0	X	X	X	X	1
Kristy McDonald 🔨	2	1	3	0	1	1	X	X	X	X	8

=== Draw 5 ===
Thursday, January 22, 8:30 am

Sheet A	1	2	3	4	5	6	7	8	9	10	Final
Barb Spencer 🔨	0	2	0	0	2	0	1	3	0	X	8
Colleen Kilgallen	0	0	1	1	0	2	0	0	1	X	5

Sheet B	1	2	3	4	5	6	7	8	9	10	Final
Michelle Montford 🔨	2	2	0	2	4	0	X	X	X	X	10
Terry Ursel	0	0	1	0	0	1	X	X	X	X	2

Sheet C	1	2	3	4	5	6	7	8	9	10	Final
Darcy Robertson 🔨	0	2	1	0	3	1	0	1	X	X	8
Stacey Fordyce	0	0	0	1	0	0	1	0	X	X	2

Sheet D	1	2	3	4	5	6	7	8	9	10	Final
Kelly Wiwcharuk	0	1	0	0	0	0	0	0	X	X	1
Jennifer Jones 🔨	3	0	1	0	1	3	1	1	X	X	10

=== Draw 6 ===
Thursday, January 22, 12:15 pm

Sheet A	1	2	3	4	5	6	7	8	9	10	Final
Kristy McDonald	0	0	1	0	2	0	0	0	0	X	3
Joelle Brown 🔨	0	1	0	0	0	2	0	2	2	X	7

Sheet B	1	2	3	4	5	6	7	8	9	10	11	Final
Janet Harvey	0	2	0	0	1	0	1	0	1	1	0	6
Tina Kozak 🔨	3	0	1	1	0	0	0	1	0	0	1	7

Sheet C	1	2	3	4	5	6	7	8	9	10	Final
Kerri Einarson 🔨	0	1	0	2	0	0	2	0	1	1	7
Keileigh Strath	0	0	2	0	1	1	0	1	0	0	5

Sheet D	1	2	3	4	5	6	7	8	9	10	Final
Tiffany McLean	0	0	1	0	0	1	0	0	0	X	2
Jill Thurston 🔨	1	0	0	1	2	0	1	3	1	X	9

=== Draw 7 ===
Thursday, January 22, 4:00 pm

Sheet A	1	2	3	4	5	6	7	8	9	10	Final
Terry Ursel 🔨	2	0	1	0	1	1	3	1	2	X	11
Darcy Robertson	0	2	0	2	0	0	0	0	0	X	4

Sheet B	1	2	3	4	5	6	7	8	9	10	Final
Jennifer Jones 🔨	2	0	1	2	5	X	X	X	X	X	10
Colleen Kilgallen	0	1	0	0	0	X	X	X	X	X	1

Sheet C	1	2	3	4	5	6	7	8	9	10	Final
Kelly Wiwcharuk	0	1	0	0	0	X	X	X	X	X	1
Barb Spencer 🔨	3	0	5	2	1	X	X	X	X	X	10

Sheet D	1	2	3	4	5	6	7	8	9	10	Final
Michelle Montford 🔨	1	0	3	0	0	2	1	0	0	X	7
Stacey Fordyce	0	2	0	1	1	0	0	1	1	X	6

=== Draw 8 ===
Thursday, January 22, 7:45 pm

Sheet A	1	2	3	4	5	6	7	8	9	10	Final
Tina Kozak	0	0	0	0	0	X	X	X	X	X	0
Kerri Einarson	0	1	3	1	3	X	X	X	X	X	8

Sheet B	1	2	3	4	5	6	7	8	9	10	Final
Jill Thurston	0	1	0	0	2	0	0	0	1	0	4
Joelle Brown	0	0	3	0	0	0	1	0	0	1	5

Sheet C	1	2	3	4	5	6	7	8	9	10	Final
Tiffany McLean	0	1	0	0	0	X	X	X	X	X	1
Kristy McDonald 🔨	3	0	0	5	4	X	X	X	X	X	12

Sheet D	1	2	3	4	5	6	7	8	9	10	Final
Janet Harvey	0	1	0	0	0	0	X	X	X	X	1
Kaileigh Strath 🔨	2	0	2	1	3	1	X	X	X	X	9

=== Draw 9 ===
Friday, January 23, 8:30 am

Sheet A	1	2	3	4	5	6	7	8	9	10	Final
Kristy McDonald 🔨	5	3	0	0	1	X	X	X	X	X	9
Janet Harvey	0	0	1	1	0	X	X	X	X	X	2

Sheet B	1	2	3	4	5	6	7	8	9	10	Final
Kaileigh Strath 🔨	1	0	2	3	0	0	2	5	X	X	13
Tiffany McLean	0	1	0	0	2	0	0	0	X	X	3

Sheet C	1	2	3	4	5	6	7	8	9	10	Final
Joelle Brown 🔨	1	0	0	0	2	3	0	0	2	1	9
Tina Kozak	0	1	1	2	0	0	0	1	0	0	5

Sheet D	1	2	3	4	5	6	7	8	9	10	Final
Kerri Einarson	0	1	1	4	0	1	2	0	X	X	9
Jill Thurston 🔨	2	0	0	0	2	0	0	1	X	X	5

=== Draw 10 ===
Friday, January 23, 12:15 pm

Sheet A	1	2	3	4	5	6	7	8	9	10	Final
Barb Spencer	0	2	2	1	2	2	X	X	X	X	9
Michelle Montford 🔨	1	0	0	0	0	0	X	X	X	X	1

Sheet B	1	2	3	4	5	6	7	8	9	10	Final
Stacey Fordyce 🔨	2	4	0	3	0	0	0	3	X	X	12
Kelly Wiwcharuk	0	0	2	0	1	1	1	0	X	X	5

Sheet C	1	2	3	4	5	6	7	8	9	10	Final
Colleen Kilgallen 🔨	2	0	2	3	1	0	1	1	X	X	10
Terry Ursel	0	1	0	0	0	3	0	0	X	X	4

Sheet D	1	2	3	4	5	6	7	8	9	10	Final
Darcy Robertson	0	0	0	0	0	0	X	X	X	X	0
Jennifer Jones 🔨	2	0	2	1	1	3	X	X	X	X	9

=== Draw 11 ===
Friday, January 23, 4:00 pm

Sheet A	1	2	3	4	5	6	7	8	9	10	Final
Kaileigh Strath 🔨	2	0	0	2	0	4	0	2	X	X	10
Tina Kozak	0	1	0	0	1	0	1	0	X	X	3

Sheet B	1	2	3	4	5	6	7	8	9	10	Final
Janet Harvey	0	2	0	2	0	0	0	1	0	X	5
Kerri Einarson 🔨	1	0	2	0	2	1	1	0	1	X	8

Sheet C	1	2	3	4	5	6	7	8	9	10	Final
Jill Thurston	0	0	0	1	1	0	1	1	0	X	4
Kristy McDonald 🔨	0	3	1	0	0	2	0	0	2	X	8

Sheet D	1	2	3	4	5	6	7	8	9	10	Final
Joelle Brown	0	0	3	0	0	2	0	0	2	3	10
Tiffany McLean 🔨	0	1	0	1	1	0	1	1	0	0	5

=== Draw 12 ===
Friday, January 23, 7:45 pm

Sheet A	1	2	3	4	5	6	7	8	9	10	Final
Stacey Fordyce	0	0	1	0	2	0	2	1	0	0	6
Terry Ursel 🔨	1	0	0	2	0	3	0	0	1	2	9

Sheet B	1	2	3	4	5	6	7	8	9	10	Final
Michelle Montford	0	0	0	2	0	2	0	0	2	0	6
Darcy Robertson 🔨	2	0	1	0	1	0	0	2	0	1	7

Sheet C	1	2	3	4	5	6	7	8	9	10	Final
Jennifer Jones 🔨	2	2	1	1	0	2	2	X	X	X	10
Barb Spencer	0	0	0	0	1	0	0	X	X	X	1

Sheet D	1	2	3	4	5	6	7	8	9	10	Final
Colleen Kilgallen 🔨	1	2	0	3	0	0	4	X	X	X	10
Kelly Wiwcharuk	0	0	0	0	1	1	0	X	X	X	2

=== Draw 13 ===
Saturday, January 24, 8:30 am

Sheet A	1	2	3	4	5	6	7	8	9	10	Final
Jill Thurston 🔨	1	0	0	2	1	X	X	X	X	X	4
Janet Harvey	0	1	2	0	0	X	X	X	X	X	3

Sheet B	1	2	3	4	5	6	7	8	9	10	Final
Tina Kozak	0	0	3	0	2	0	0	0	1	3	9
Tiffany McLean 🔨	1	1	0	0	0	0	2	2	0	0	6

Sheet C	1	2	3	4	5	6	7	8	9	10	Final
Joelle Brown 🔨	0	1	0	2	0	1	0	0	1	X	5
Kaileigh Strath	3	0	2	0	1	0	0	2	0	X	8

Sheet D	1	2	3	4	5	6	7	8	9	10	Final
Kristy McDonald 🔨	0	1	0	0	1	0	0	1	0	1	4
Kerri Einarson	0	0	0	1	0	2	1	0	1	0	5

=== Draw 14 ===
Saturday, January 24, 12:15 pm

Sheet A	1	2	3	4	5	6	7	8	9	10	Final
Jennifer Jones 🔨	1	3	1	0	1	0	2	1	X	X	9
Michelle Montford	0	0	0	1	0	2	0	0	X	X	3

Sheet B	1	2	3	4	5	6	7	8	9	10	Final
Terry Ursel	0	5	0	1	3	X	X	X	X	X	9
Kelly Wiwcharuk	1	0	1	0	0	X	X	X	X	X	2

Sheet C	1	2	3	4	5	6	7	8	9	10	Final
Colleen Kilgallen 🔨	0	1	0	2	1	2	1	0	1	X	8
Stacey Fordyce	0	0	1	0	0	0	0	2	0	X	3

Sheet D	1	2	3	4	5	6	7	8	9	10	Final
Barb Spencer 🔨	1	1	2	1	0	2	0	1	3	X	11
Darcy Robertson	0	0	0	0	1	0	2	0	0	X	3

== Tiebreaker ==
Saturday, January 24, 4:00 pm

Team	1	2	3	4	5	6	7	8	9	10	Final
Joelle Brown	0	0	1	0	0	0	X	X	X	X	1
Kristy McDonald	2	1	0	4	1	2	X	X	X	X	10

== Playoffs ==
Page playoff system
R1	Kerri Einarson	6
B1	Jennifer Jones	9
R2	Kristy McDonald	7
B2	Barb Spencer	8

Semifinal
R1	Kerri Einarson	5
B2	Barb Spencer	3

Final
B1	Jennifer Jones	5
R1	Kerri Einarson	2

=== R1 vs. B1 ===
Saturday, January 24, 6:00 pm

Team	1	2	3	4	5	6	7	8	9	10	Final
Jennifer Jones 🔨	2	0	3	0	0	2	1	0	1	X	9
Kerri Einarson	0	2	0	2	1	0	0	1	0	X	6

=== R2 vs. B2 ===
Saturday, January 24, 8:30 pm

Team	1	2	3	4	5	6	7	8	9	10	11	Final
Barb Spencer 🔨	2	1	0	0	0	3	0	0	0	1	1	8
Kristy McDonald	0	0	1	1	2	0	1	1	1	0	0	7

=== Semifinal ===
Sunday, January 25, 11:30 am

Team	1	2	3	4	5	6	7	8	9	10	Final
Kerri Einarson	0	0	0	1	1	0	0	1	2	X	5
Barb Spencer 🔨	0	2	0	0	0	0	1	0	0	X	3

=== Final ===
Sunday, January 25, 4:00 pm

Team	1	2	3	4	5	6	7	8	9	10	Final
Jennifer Jones 🔨	1	0	0	0	1	0	0	2	1	X	5
Kerri Einarson	0	0	0	1	0	1	0	0	0	X	2

2015 Manitoba Scotties Tournament of Hearts

Jennifer Jones
7th Manitoba Provincial Championship title
