= Dot Rose =

Former Canadian curler and softball player

Medal record

Women's Curling

Representing Manitoba

Scott Tournament of Hearts
Gold medal – first place	1967 Mount Royal	
Silver medal – second place	1973 Charlottetown	
Silver medal – second place	1982 Regina	

Women's Softball

Representing Manitoba

Canadian Fast Pitch Championship
Gold medal – first place	1965 Winnipeg	

Dorothy Rose (born July 2, 1938) is a former Canadian curler and softball player. She won national championships in both sports, winning in softball in 1965 and curling in 1967.

Rose was born in Carman, Manitoba and grew up in Sperling, later moving to Winnipeg.

== Career ==
=== Softball ===
In softball, Rose excelled as a pitcher, and won provincial championships every year from 1957 to 1973 with the CUAC Blues, as well two Western Canadian titles (1957 and 1960) and the Canadian senior women's championship in 1965. After 1973, Rose planned to focus more on curling after winning a championship in 1972.

=== Curling ===
In curling, Rose won her first provincial championship in 1967 playing lead for the Betty Duguid rink, which also included her softball team mates Joan Ingram and Laurie Bradawaski. This qualified the team to represent Manitoba at the 1967 Diamond D Championship, Canada's national women's curling championship. The team went undefeated, winning all nine of their games en route to the national championship. The team won a second provincial title in 1969 with Pat Brundson skipping the team, replacing Duguid who had moved to the United States. At the 1969 Canadian Ladies Curling Association Championship, the team went 5–4, in a three way tie for fourth place. Rose won her third provincial title in 1973, now playing second on her team, with Ingram now skipping. The team represented Manitoba at the 1973 Macdonald Lassies Championship, the national women's championship. There, they finished the round robin with an 8–1 record, tied for first with Team Saskatchewan, skipped by Vera Pezer. This forced a tiebreaker play-off for the championship, which Saskatchewan won 6–4.

Rose did not win another provincial title until 1982, which she won as a skip, with team mates Lynne Andrews, Kim Crass and Shannon Burns. Ranked fourth at the provincial championship, she defeated Chris More in the final. At the 1982 Scott Tournament of Hearts Canadian championship, Rose led her Manitoba rink to a 7–3 round robin record, in a five-way tie for first place. Among the five teams, Manitoba was ranked second based on their head to head record against the tied teams. The tie forced a change in the play-off format from the usual three teams, to four teams, with Manitoba to play the third ranked British Columbia rink, skipped by Barbara Parker. Rose beat BC in the semifinal 10–5, thanks to a steal of two in the second and three in the seventh end. This put her into the final against Nova Scotia, skipped by a 20-year old Colleen Jones. The game was a close affair, and was tied going into the 10th end, when Jones made an open hit for the win, 8–7. While the game was close, Jones out curled Rose 86% to 68%.

After turning 50, Rose shifted to senior women's play. She won her first provincial seniors title in 1990, playing third for Joan Ingram. At the 1990 Canadian Senior Curling Championships, the team finished with a 7–3 record, and lost in the semifinal to Alberta's Amy Nakamura. The team won another seniors provincial in 1992, and finished with a 7–4 record at the 1992 Canadian Seniors. They won a third provincial senior in 1993, and at the 1993 Canadian Senior Curling Championships, finished with a 9–2 round robin record. This was good enough for first place, and gave them a bye to the final, where they faced off against Ontario, skipped by Jill Greenwood, whom they lost to 6–4.

Rose won her final provincial tournament, winning the 2000 women's masters championship as skip for curlers over 60.

== Personal life ==
Rose comes from a large family of 15 siblings. She worked as a supervisor for Investors Syndicate. She is a member of the Manitoba Sports Hall of Fame, the Manitoba Curling Hall of Fame and the Manitoba Softball Hall of Fame.
