= Wüthrich =

Wüthrich is a Swiss surname that may refer to

- Gabriel Wüthrich, (born 1981), Swiss football player
- Gregory Wüthrich, (born 1994), Swiss football player
- Hans Wuthrich, football match official
- Hans Wuthrich (icemaker), curling ice technician
- Karl Wüthrich, Swiss footballer
- Kurt Wüthrich, (born 1938), Swiss chemist and Nobel Chemistry laureate
- Rolf Wüthrich, (1938–2004), Swiss football player
- Sébastien Wüthrich, (born 1990), Swiss football player
- Ryn Weaver, (born 1992 as Erin Michelle Wüthrich), American singer-songwriter
