= 1978 Macdonald Lassies Championship =

Canadian women's curling championship

- Host city: Sault Ste. Marie, Ontario
- Arena: Sault Memorial Gardens
- Dates: February 26–March 2
- Winner: Manitoba
- Curling club: Stony Mountain CC, Stony Mountain
- Skip: Cathy Pidzarko
- Third: Chris Pidzarko
- Second: Iris Armstrong
- Lead: Patti Vanderkerckhove

The 1978 Macdonald Lassies Championship, the Canadian women's curling championship was held February 26 to March 2, 1978, at the Sault Memorial Gardens in Sault Ste. Marie, Ontario.

Team Manitoba, who was skipped by Cathy Pidzarko won the event by finishing round robin play with a 7–3 record. This was Manitoba's third championship with their last title coming in 1967.

This would be the last women's championship to have a champion determined by round robin and the last one before the creation of the Women's World Curling Championship.

== Teams ==
The teams are listed as follows:

Alberta	British Columbia	Manitoba	New Brunswick
Edmonton Thistle CC, Edmonton Skip: Betty Cole; Third: Liz Gemmell; Second: Anne McGarvey; Lead: Shirley Fisk	Richmond CC, Richmond Skip: Heather Haywood; Third: Bernice McCallan; Second: Shirley Snihur; Lead: Una Goodyear	Stony Mountain CC, Stony Mountain Skip: Cathy Pidzarko; Third: Chris Pidzarko; Second: Iris Armstrong; Lead: Patti Vanderkerckhove	Bathurst CC, Bathurst Skip: Karen McDermott; Third: Gisele Shaw; Second: Ilona Schnarr; Lead: Lillian Lavigne
Newfoundland	Nova Scotia	Ontario	Prince Edward Island
Carol CC, Labrador City Skip: Sue Anne Bartlett; Third: Patricia Dwyer; Second: Joyce Butt; Lead: Mavis Pike	Dartmouth CC, Dartmouth Skip: Penny LaRocque; Third: Brenda Shutt; Second: Charmaine Murray; Lead: Wendy Conrad	Forest City CC, London Skip: Sheila Seltzer; Third: Louise Davison; Second: Jane Chalmers; Lead: Marlene Linton	Charlottetown CC, Charlottetown Skip: Gloria Basha; Third: Marilyn Sutherland; Second: Wilma McLure; Lead: Marion Basha
Quebec	Saskatchewan	Northwest Territories/Yukon
Montreal Caledonia CC, Westmount Skip: Carole Topp; Third: Nicole Labelle; Second: Katherine Randall; Lead: Ann Delage	Hub City CC, Saskatoon Skip: Charlene Goodwin; Third: Holly Webster; Second: Nancy Bint; Lead: Betty Fairweather	Yellowknife CC, Yellowknife Skip: Donna Alexander; Third: Doris Sekulich; Second: Cecille Ward; Lead: Dora Delmage

== Map of teams ==
Provincial Winners

== Round Robin standings ==
Final round robin standings

Key
Lassies champion

Team	Skip	W	L	PF	PA
Manitoba	Cathy Pidzarko	7	3	73	48
Nova Scotia	Penny LaRocque	6	4	77	62
Alberta	Betty Cole	6	4	72	68
British Columbia	Heather Haywood	6	4	80	68
Newfoundland	Sue Anne Bartlett	5	5	81	71
New Brunswick	Karen McDermott	5	5	71	73
Ontario	Sheila Seltzer	5	5	77	81
Prince Edward Island	Gloria Basha	5	5	61	83
Quebec	Carole Topp	4	6	55	79
Saskatchewan	Charlene Goodwin	4	6	73	69
Northwest Territories/Yukon	Donna Alexander	2	8	58	76

== Round Robin results ==
All draw times are listed in Eastern Standard Time (UTC-05:00).

=== Draw 1 ===
Sunday, February 26, 2:30 pm

Team	1	2	3	4	5	6	7	8	9	10	Final
British Columbia (Haywood)	0	2	2	3	0	0	1	0	5	X	13
Saskatchewan (Goodwin)	1	0	0	0	1	3	0	1	0	X	6

Team	1	2	3	4	5	6	7	8	9	10	Final
Quebec (Topp)	1	0	0	3	1	1	0	2	0	1	9
Newfoundland (Bartlett)	0	1	1	0	0	0	2	0	2	0	6

Team	1	2	3	4	5	6	7	8	9	10	Final
New Brunswick (McDermott)	1	0	4	4	0	0	1	0	0	X	10
Ontario (Seltzer)	0	1	0	0	1	2	0	1	1	X	6

Team	1	2	3	4	5	6	7	8	9	10	11	Final
Nova Scotia (LaRocque)	0	1	0	0	1	0	1	1	0	1	0	5
Manitoba (Pidzarko)	1	0	1	1	0	2	0	0	0	0	1	6

Team	1	2	3	4	5	6	7	8	9	10	Final
Prince Edward Island (Basha)	0	1	0	0	2	1	0	1	0	2	7
Northwest Territories/Yukon (Alexander)	3	0	1	0	0	0	1	0	1	0	6

=== Draw 2 ===
Sunday, February 26, 7:30 pm

Team	1	2	3	4	5	6	7	8	9	10	11	Final
Ontario (Seltzer)	2	0	0	0	0	0	0	1	0	2	0	5
Manitoba (Pidzarko)	0	0	1	1	0	0	0	0	3	0	2	7

Team	1	2	3	4	5	6	7	8	9	10	11	Final
Saskatchewan (Goodwin)	2	1	0	0	0	0	1	0	2	0	5	11
Northwest Territories/Yukon (Alexander)	0	0	1	2	0	1	0	1	0	1	0	6

Team	1	2	3	4	5	6	7	8	9	10	Final
Newfoundland (Bartlett)	2	0	0	0	3	2	0	3	0	X	10
New Brunswick (McDermott)	0	2	1	1	0	0	1	0	1	X	6

Team	1	2	3	4	5	6	7	8	9	10	Final
Quebec (Topp)	0	0	1	1	0	0	1	1	0	X	4
Prince Edward Island (Basha)	1	1	0	0	3	2	0	0	1	X	8

Team	1	2	3	4	5	6	7	8	9	10	Final
British Columbia (Haywood)	1	1	0	1	0	2	0	2	0	0	7
Alberta (Cole)	0	0	1	0	1	0	2	0	1	3	8

=== Draw 3 ===
Monday, February 27, 2:00 pm

Team	1	2	3	4	5	6	7	8	9	10	Final
Newfoundland (Bartlett)	1	0	2	4	3	0	X	X	X	X	10
Manitoba (Pidzarko)	0	0	0	0	0	2	X	X	X	X	2

Team	1	2	3	4	5	6	7	8	9	10	Final
Northwest Territories/Yukon (Alexander)	0	0	0	0	0	1	0	1	X	X	2
Alberta (Cole)	2	0	1	0	2	0	2	0	X	X	7

Team	1	2	3	4	5	6	7	8	9	10	Final
Saskatchewan (Goodwin)	0	1	0	0	1	1	0	1	1	0	5
Quebec (Topp)	1	0	2	1	0	0	1	0	0	1	6

Team	1	2	3	4	5	6	7	8	9	10	Final
New Brunswick (McDermott)	0	0	1	0	2	0	2	0	1	1	7
Prince Edward Island (Basha)	1	1	0	1	0	1	0	0	0	0	4

Team	1	2	3	4	5	6	7	8	9	10	Final
Ontario (Seltzer)	0	1	0	3	0	1	0	1	1	0	7
Nova Scotia (LaRocque)	1	0	2	0	1	0	2	0	0	2	8

=== Draw 4 ===
Monday, February 27, 7:30 pm

Team	1	2	3	4	5	6	7	8	9	10	Final
British Columbia (Haywood)	0	0	0	0	0	3	0	1	0	X	4
Northwest Territories/Yukon (Alexander)	0	1	1	3	3	0	3	0	2	X	13

Team	1	2	3	4	5	6	7	8	9	10	Final
Manitoba (Pidzarko)	0	3	0	1	2	3	0	1	1	X	11
Prince Edward Island (Basha)	1	0	1	0	0	0	1	0	0	X	3

Team	1	2	3	4	5	6	7	8	9	10	Final
Newfoundland (Bartlett)	1	0	1	0	0	0	0	1	0	X	3
Nova Scotia (LaRocque)	0	1	0	2	1	0	3	0	6	X	13

Team	1	2	3	4	5	6	7	8	9	10	Final
Saskatchewan (Goodwin)	1	0	0	1	1	0	3	0	0	3	9
New Brunswick (McDermott)	0	4	1	0	0	1	0	1	1	0	8

Team	1	2	3	4	5	6	7	8	9	10	Final
Quebec (Topp)	0	2	3	0	0	0	1	0	0	X	4
Alberta (Cole)	4	0	0	1	2	1	0	2	2	X	12

=== Draw 5 ===
Tuesday, February 28, 9:00 am

Team	1	2	3	4	5	6	7	8	9	10	Final
British Columbia (Haywood)	3	1	1	1	0	2	0	4	X	X	12
Quebec (Topp)	0	0	0	0	3	0	1	0	X	X	4

Team	1	2	3	4	5	6	7	8	9	10	Final
Saskatchewan (Goodwin)	0	0	1	0	0	3	0	0	1	X	5
Manitoba (Pidzarko)	0	1	0	2	2	0	1	2	0	X	8

Team	1	2	3	4	5	6	7	8	9	10	Final
Nova Scotia (LaRocque)	2	0	0	0	0	1	0	0	0	X	3
Prince Edward Island (Basha)	0	1	3	0	2	0	1	2	2	X	11

Team	1	2	3	4	5	6	7	8	9	10	Final
New Brunswick (McDermott)	1	1	1	0	1	0	0	0	0	X	4
Alberta (Cole)	0	0	0	1	0	3	0	1	1	X	6

Team	1	2	3	4	5	6	7	8	9	10	Final
Newfoundland (Bartlett)	0	2	1	0	2	0	2	0	4	0	11
Ontario (Seltzer)	2	0	0	2	0	4	0	3	0	2	13

=== Draw 6 ===
Tuesday, February 28, 2:00 pm

Team	1	2	3	4	5	6	7	8	9	10	Final
Ontario (Seltzer)	0	1	2	2	0	0	3	3	1	X	12
Prince Edward Island (Basha)	2	0	0	0	3	1	0	0	1	X	6

Team	1	2	3	4	5	6	7	8	9	10	Final
Manitoba (Pidzarko)	0	0	3	0	0	0	2	0	0	0	5
Alberta (Cole)	2	1	0	1	0	0	0	0	1	1	6

Team	1	2	3	4	5	6	7	8	9	10	Final
British Columbia (Haywood)	0	0	1	0	3	0	0	1	2	2	9
New Brunswick (McDermott)	3	0	0	2	0	1	1	0	0	0	7

Team	1	2	3	4	5	6	7	8	9	10	Final
Quebec (Topp)	1	1	0	2	0	1	0	0	0	2	7
Northwest Territories/Yukon (Alexander)	0	0	2	0	1	0	1	1	0	0	5

Team	1	2	3	4	5	6	7	8	9	10	Final
Saskatchewan (Goodwin)	0	0	0	1	0	0	1	0	X	X	2
Nova Scotia (LaRocque)	2	3	0	0	2	3	0	2	X	X	12

=== Draw 7 ===
Tuesday, February 28, 7:30 pm

Team	1	2	3	4	5	6	7	8	9	10	Final
New Brunswick (McDermott)	0	1	0	0	0	2	0	2	5	X	10
Northwest Territories/Yukon (Alexander)	3	0	1	1	2	0	1	0	0	X	8

Team	1	2	3	4	5	6	7	8	9	10	Final
Nova Scotia (LaRocque)	0	1	0	0	3	0	2	2	1	1	10
Alberta (Cole)	2	0	2	1	0	2	0	0	0	0	7

Team	1	2	3	4	5	6	7	8	9	10	Final
Saskatchewan (Goodwin)	1	0	2	0	2	1	3	4	X	X	13
Ontario (Seltzer)	0	1	0	1	0	0	0	0	X	X	2

Team	1	2	3	4	5	6	7	8	9	10	Final
Newfoundland (Bartlett)	2	0	3	1	0	3	3	X	X	X	12
Prince Edward Island (Basha)	0	1	0	0	2	0	0	X	X	X	3

Team	1	2	3	4	5	6	7	8	9	10	Final
British Columbia (Haywood)	1	0	1	0	2	2	0	1	0	X	7
Manitoba (Pidzarko)	0	1	0	1	0	0	1	0	1	X	4

=== Draw 8 ===
Wednesday, March 1, 2:00 pm

Team	1	2	3	4	5	6	7	8	9	10	11	Final
Saskatchewan (Goodwin)	0	0	1	1	1	0	1	0	1	0	0	5
Newfoundland (Bartlett)	1	0	0	0	0	1	0	2	0	1	2	7

Team	1	2	3	4	5	6	7	8	9	10	Final
British Columbia (Haywood)	0	1	0	3	0	1	0	1	0	0	6
Nova Scotia (LaRocque)	1	0	2	0	1	0	1	0	1	1	7

Team	1	2	3	4	5	6	7	8	9	10	Final
Manitoba (Pidzarko)	0	1	3	3	0	0	2	X	X	X	9
Northwest Territories/Yukon (Alexander)	0	0	0	0	1	1	0	X	X	X	2

Team	1	2	3	4	5	6	7	8	9	10	Final
Quebec (Topp)	0	0	0	0	0	3	0	0	X	X	3
New Brunswick (McDermott)	2	2	1	2	1	0	1	1	X	X	10

Team	1	2	3	4	5	6	7	8	9	10	Final
Ontario (Seltzer)	1	1	0	1	0	4	1	0	3	X	11
Alberta (Cole)	0	0	1	0	1	0	0	4	0	X	6

=== Draw 9 ===
Wednesday, March 1, 7:30 pm

Team	1	2	3	4	5	6	7	8	9	10	Final
Quebec (Topp)	0	1	0	0	1	0	0	1	X	X	3
Manitoba (Pidzarko)	1	0	2	2	0	3	1	0	X	X	9

Team	1	2	3	4	5	6	7	8	9	10	Final
British Columbia (Haywood)	0	1	1	0	2	1	0	3	0	X	8
Ontario (Seltzer)	1	0	0	1	0	0	1	0	2	X	5

Team	1	2	3	4	5	6	7	8	9	10	Final
Newfoundland (Bartlett)	2	0	1	1	3	0	0	5	0	X	12
Alberta (Cole)	0	2	0	0	0	2	2	0	1	X	7

Team	1	2	3	4	5	6	7	8	9	10	Final
Saskatchewan (Goodwin)	2	0	5	2	1	0	3	X	X	X	13
Prince Edward Island (Basha)	0	1	0	0	0	1	0	X	X	X	2

Team	1	2	3	4	5	6	7	8	9	10	Final
Nova Scotia (LaRocque)	0	4	1	0	0	0	2	0	2	X	9
Northwest Territories/Yukon (Alexander)	2	0	0	1	1	1	0	0	0	X	5

=== Draw 10 ===
Thursday, March 2, 2:00 pm

Team	1	2	3	4	5	6	7	8	9	10	Final
Prince Edward Island (Basha)	0	1	0	3	0	1	0	2	0	2	9
Alberta (Cole)	1	0	2	0	1	0	2	0	2	0	8

Team	1	2	3	4	5	6	7	8	9	10	Final
Ontario (Seltzer)	0	0	0	1	1	3	1	1	1	X	8
Northwest Territories/Yukon (Alexander)	2	1	2	0	0	0	0	0	0	X	5

Team	1	2	3	4	5	6	7	8	9	10	Final
Quebec (Topp)	0	0	1	1	1	2	0	2	1	X	8
Nova Scotia (LaRocque)	1	2	0	0	0	0	1	0	0	X	4

Team	1	2	3	4	5	6	7	8	9	10	Final
New Brunswick (McDermott)	0	0	1	0	1	0	0	X	X	X	2
Manitoba (Pidzarko)	3	2	0	3	0	2	2	X	X	X	12

Team	1	2	3	4	5	6	7	8	9	10	Final
British Columbia (Haywood)	2	0	0	1	1	0	1	0	0	2	7
Newfoundland (Bartlett)	0	1	1	0	0	2	0	1	1	0	6

=== Draw 11 ===
Tuesday, March 2, 7:00 pm

Team	1	2	3	4	5	6	7	8	9	10	Final
New Brunswick (McDermott)	1	1	0	1	1	1	0	2	0	0	7
Nova Scotia (LaRocque)	0	0	2	0	0	0	1	0	2	1	6

Team	1	2	3	4	5	6	7	8	9	10	Final
Newfoundland (Bartlett)	0	0	0	1	0	1	1	0	0	1	4
Northwest Territories/Yukon (Alexander)	0	1	1	0	0	0	0	1	3	0	6

Team	1	2	3	4	5	6	7	8	9	10	Final
British Columbia (Haywood)	1	0	1	0	1	2	0	0	2	0	7
Prince Edward Island (Basha)	0	2	0	1	0	0	1	2	0	2	8

Team	1	2	3	4	5	6	7	8	9	10	Final
Saskatchewan (Goodwin)	0	0	1	1	1	0	0	0	1	X	4
Alberta (Cole)	0	1	0	0	0	3	0	1	0	X	5

Team	1	2	3	4	5	6	7	8	9	10	Final
Quebec (Topp)	2	0	3	0	1	0	0	0	1	0	7
Ontario (Seltzer)	0	0	0	2	0	4	0	1	0	1	8
