= Thistle Curling Club =

The Thistle Curling Club is the name of a number of curling clubs:

== Current clubs ==
- Delta Thistle Curling Club in Delta, British Columbia
- Thistle Curling Club (Edmonton) in Edmonton
- Thistle Curling Club (Winnipeg) in Winnipeg

== Former clubs ==
- Thistle Curling Club (Hamilton) in Hamilton, Ontario (closed in 2002)
- Thistle Curling Club (Montreal) in Montreal (closed in 1999)
- Thistle Curling Club (Saint John) in Saint John, New Brunswick. Merged with the St. Andrew's Curling Club in 1975 becoming the Thistle-St. Andrew's Curling Club.
