= Gerry Duguid =

Canadian football player

Profile
- Position: Halfback

Personal information
- Born: December 22, 1929
- Died: September 8, 1993 (aged 63)
- Listed height: 5 ft 10 in (1.78 m)
- Listed weight: 160 lb (73 kg)

Career history
- 1950–1951: Winnipeg Blue Bombers
- 1952: Calgary Stampeders

Gerald C. Duguid (December 22, 1929 – September 8, 1993) was a Canadian professional football player who played for the Winnipeg Blue Bombers and Calgary Stampeders.

He later moved to the Chicago, Illinois area and was active in further establishing curling at several locations. He died in 1993 and is buried in Winnipeg. His younger brother is world champion curler Don Duguid. He was married to Canadian and U.S. champion curler Betty Duguid.

Duguid also curled, and was runner-up at the Manitoba men's championship in 1953 and 1956.
