= 2010 Manitoba Scotties Tournament of Hearts =

- Host city: Killarney, Manitoba
- Arena: Shamrock Centre
- Dates: January 6–10
- Winner: Team Thurston
- Curling club: Deer Lodge CC, Winnipeg
- Skip: Jill Thurston
- Third: Kristen Phillips
- Second: Leslie Wilson
- Lead: Raunora Westcott
- Finalist: Janet Harvey

The 2010 Manitoba Scotties Tournament of Hearts, Manitoba's provincial women's curling championship, was held January 6–10 in Killarney, Manitoba. The winning Jill Thurston rink represented team Manitoba at the 2010 Scotties Tournament of Hearts in Sault Ste. Marie, Ontario.

== Teams ==
=== Black Group ===
Skip	Vice	Second	Lead	Alternate	Club
Joelle Brown	Tracey Lavery	Tamera Bauknecht	Kristie Moroz		Fort Rouge Curling Club, Winnipeg
Karen Fallis	Calleen Neufeld	Lisa DeRiviere	Jolene Rutter		Wildwood Curling Club, Winnipeg
Tanis Fortin	Lori Forbes	Janis Fjermestad	Maxine Everson	Sandy Reeves	The Pas Curling Club, The Pas
Kim Link	Colleen Kilgallen	Pam Kolton	Renee Fletcher		East St. Paul Curling Club, East St. Paul, Manitoba
Liza Park	Kendra Georges	Amy Heath	Kristi Green		Wheat City Curling Club, Brandon
Barb Spencer	Darcy Robertson	Vanessa Foster	Barb Enright		Fort Rouge Curling Club, Winnipeg
Kaileigh Strath	Sabrina Neufeld	Karen Hodgson	Brenna Philip		Winkler Curling Club, Winkler
Terry Ursel	Wanda Rainka	Jennifer Meloney	Brenda Walker		Plumas Curling Club, Plumas

=== Red Group ===
Skip	Vice	Second	Lead	Alternate	Club
Lisa Blixhavn	Lana Hunter	Rhonda Ritchie	Tanya Enns		Brandon Curling Club, Brandon
Chelsea Carey	Kari White	Kristen Foster	Lindsay Titheridge		Morden Curling Club, Morden
Kari Goethe	Staci Goodman	Jodi Proctor	Sandra Tibble		Swan River Curling Club, Swan River, Manitoba
Janet Harvey	Cherie-Ann Loder	Kristin Loder	Carey Kirby		Assiniboine Memorial CC, Winnipeg
Karen Rosser	Cheryl Reed	Sam Owen	Lindsay Edie		Springfield Curling Club, Dugald
Linda Stewart	Jennifer Clark-Rouire	Tamy Schoenrath	Cindy Wainikki		Fort Rouge Curling Club, Winnipeg
Shauna Streich	Karen Klein	Lesle Cafferty	Susan McCambridge	Ainsley Champagne	Fort Rouge Curling Club, Winnipeg
Jill Thurston	Kristen Phillips	Leslie Wilson	Raunora Westcott		Deer Lodge Curling Club, Winnipeg

== Standings ==
=== Black Group ===
Kim Link (East St. Paul)	6	1
Joelle Brown (Fort Rouge)	6	1
Barb Spencer (Fort Rouge)	5	2
Karen Fallis (Wildwood)	4	3
Kaileigh Strath (Winkler)	4	3
Tanis Fortin (The Pas)	1	6
Terry Ursel (Plumas)	1	6
Liza Park (Wheat City)	1	6

=== Red Group ===
Janet Harvey (Assiniboine)	6	1
Jill Thurston (Deer Lodge)	6	1
Lisa Blixhavn (Brandon)	5	2
Chelsea Carey (Morden)	5	2
Shauna Streich (Fort Rouge)	2	5
Kari Goethe (Swan River)	2	5
Karen Rosser (Springfield)	1	6
Linda Stewart (Fort Rouge)	1	6

== Results ==
=== Draw 1 ===
January 6, 8:30 a.m.

Sheet A	1	2	3	4	5	6	7	8	9	10	Final
Brown 🔨	1	4	0	1	0	2	0	1	0	1	10
Fortin	0	0	1	0	1	0	2	0	1	0	5

Sheet B	1	2	3	4	5	6	7	8	9	10	Final
Fallis 🔨	0	1	0	1	0	0	4	0	0	X	6
Ursel	0	0	1	0	1	0	0	1	1	X	4

Sheet C	1	2	3	4	5	6	7	8	9	10	Final
Park 🔨	1	0	0	2	1	0	0	X	X	X	4
Spencer	0	3	4	0	0	1	2	X	X	X	10

Sheet D	1	2	3	4	5	6	7	8	9	10	Final
Strath	0	0	1	0	1	0	2	1	1	1	7
Link 🔨	0	1	0	0	0	4	0	0	0	0	5

=== Draw 2 ===
January 6, 12:15 p.m.

Sheet A	1	2	3	4	5	6	7	8	9	10	11	Final
Blixhavn 🔨	1	1	0	0	1	0	2	1	0	0	1	7
Gorthe	0	0	1	2	0	0	0	0	2	1	0	6

Sheet B	1	2	3	4	5	6	7	8	9	10	11	Final
Carey	0	0	0	1	0	1	0	0	2	1	1	6
Stewart 🔨	0	1	0	0	2	0	1	1	0	0	0	5

Sheet C	1	2	3	4	5	6	7	8	9	10	Final
Rosser	0	1	0	0	0	0	0	X	X	X	1
Harvey 🔨	2	0	0	2	1	2	2	X	X	X	9

Sheet D	1	2	3	4	5	6	7	8	9	10	Final
Streich 🔨	0	1	0	1	0	1	0	0	0	0	3
Thurston	0	0	2	0	1	0	0	0	1	1	5

=== Draw 3 ===
January 6, 4:00 p.m.

Sheet A	1	2	3	4	5	6	7	8	9	10	Final
Spencer	0	0	2	1	0	3	0	1	3	X	10
Ursel 🔨	2	0	0	0	1	0	1	0	0	X	4

Sheet B	1	2	3	4	5	6	7	8	9	10	11	Final
Strath	0	1	0	1	0	1	1	0	0	2	0	6
Brown 🔨	1	0	1	0	2	0	0	1	1	0	4	10

Sheet C	1	2	3	4	5	6	7	8	9	10	Final
Fortin	0	1	0	0	0	0	0	1	0	X	2
Link 🔨	2	0	1	1	1	1	0	0	0	X	6

Sheet D	1	2	3	4	5	6	7	8	9	10	Final
Fallis 🔨	1	0	0	2	2	0	0	2	0	0	7
Park	0	1	1	0	0	0	1	0	2	1	6

=== Draw 4 ===
January 6, 8:15 p.m.

Sheet A	1	2	3	4	5	6	7	8	9	10	Final
Stewart	0	0	0	2	0	2	0	X	X	X	4
Harvey 🔨	0	2	4	0	2	0	4	X	X	X	12

Sheet B	1	2	3	4	5	6	7	8	9	10	Final
Blixhavn 🔨	4	1	0	4	2	X	X	X	X	X	11
Streich	0	0	1	0	0	X	X	X	X	X	1

Sheet C	1	2	3	4	5	6	7	8	9	10	Final
Goethe	0	0	2	0	2	0	X	X	X	X	4
Thurston 🔨	2	1	0	4	0	4	X	X	X	X	11

Sheet D	1	2	3	4	5	6	7	8	9	10	Final
Rosser	0	0	0	0	1	0	X	X	X	X	1
Carey 🔨	2	3	1	1	0	1	X	X	X	x	8

=== Draw 5 ===
January 7, 8:30 a.m.

Sheet A	1	2	3	4	5	6	7	8	9	10	Final
Strath 🔨	1	2	0	0	1	1	0	0	1	0	6
Fallis	0	0	2	1	0	0	1	1	0	2	7

Sheet B	1	2	3	4	5	6	7	8	9	10	Final
Park 🔨	2	0	2	0	0	0	2	1	1	0	8
Link	0	1	0	5	1	1	0	0	0	2	10

Sheet C	1	2	3	4	5	6	7	8	9	10	Final
Ursel 🔨	1	0	1	0	0	1	0	0	0	X	3
Brown	0	1	0	0	1	0	2	0	1	X	5

Sheet D	1	2	3	4	5	6	7	8	9	10	Final
Fortin 🔨	1	0	0	0	0	0	1	0	0	0	2
Spencer	0	2	2	1	1	1	0	2	0	0	9

=== Draw 6 ===
January 7, 12:15 p.m.

Sheet A	1	2	3	4	5	6	7	8	9	10	Final
Carey	0	0	1	0	5	0	0	4	X	X	10
Streich 🔨	0	1	0	1	0	2	0	0	X	X	4

Sheet B	1	2	3	4	5	6	7	8	9	10	Final
Thurston	0	1	1	4	1	1	0	0	X	X	8
Rosser 🔨	3	0	0	0	0	0	0	1	X	X	4

Sheet C	1	2	3	4	5	6	7	8	9	10	Final
Blixhavn	0	2	0	2	0	1	1	0	3	X	9
Stewart 🔨	1	0	1	0	2	0	0	1	0	X	5

Sheet D	1	2	3	4	5	6	7	8	9	10	Final
Goethe	0	1	0	0	1	0	1	0	0	X	3
Harvey 🔨	1	0	2	0	0	2	0	1	2	X	8

=== Draw 7 ===
January 7, 4:00 p.m.

Sheet A	1	2	3	4	5	6	7	8	9	10	Final
Brown 🔨	1	0	0	2	0	1	1	4	1	X	10
Park	0	2	2	0	1	0	0	0	0	X	5

Sheet B	1	2	3	4	5	6	7	8	9	10	Final
Spencer	0	1	0	3	2	0	1	0	3	X	10
Strath 🔨	1	0	2	0	0	1	0	1	0	X	5

Sheet C	1	2	3	4	5	6	7	8	9	10	Final
Fortin 🔨	1	0	1	0	0	1	0	X	X	X	3
Fallis	0	3	0	2	3	0	5	X	X	X	13

Sheet D	1	2	3	4	5	6	7	8	9	10	Final
Link 🔨	1	0	2	1	0	3	1	0	2	X	10
Ursel	0	1	0	0	1	0	0	2	0	X	4

=== Draw 8 ===
January 7, 7:45 p.m.

Sheet A	1	2	3	4	5	6	7	8	9	10	Final
Rosser 🔨	1	0	1	0	2	1	0	1	0	0	6
Blixhavn	0	2	0	2	0	0	2	0	0	2	8

Sheet B	1	2	3	4	5	6	7	8	9	10	11	Final
Harvey 🔨	0	1	0	2	0	3	0	1	1	0	1	9
Streich	0	0	2	0	2	0	3	0	0	1	0	8

Sheet C	1	2	3	4	5	6	7	8	9	10	Final
Gothe	0	0	3	0	0	1	0	X	X	X	4
Carey 🔨	0	2	0	4	1	0	3	X	X	X	10

Sheet D	1	2	3	4	5	6	7	8	9	10	Final
Thurston	0	0	0	2	2	0	0	2	1	X	7
Stewart 🔨	0	0	2	0	0	0	1	0	0	X	3

=== Draw 9 ===
January 8, 8:30 a.m.

Sheet A	1	2	3	4	5	6	7	8	9	10	Final
Thurston	0	1	1	1	2	0	2	0	X	X	7
Carey 🔨	1	0	0	0	0	2	0	1	X	X	4

Sheet B	1	2	3	4	5	6	7	8	9	10	Final
Goethe 🔨	1	0	3	2	0	1	1	X	X	X	8
Stewart	0	1	0	0	1	0	0	X	X	X	2

Sheet C	1	2	3	4	5	6	7	8	9	10	Final
Streich 🔨	3	0	0	0	5	1	X	X	X	X	9
Rosser	0	1	1	1	0	0	X	X	X	X	3

Sheet D	1	2	3	4	5	6	7	8	9	10	Final
Harvey 🔨	1	0	1	0	2	0	4	0	1	0	9
Blixhavn	0	3	0	1	0	2	0	3	0	1	10

=== Draw 10 ===
January 8, 12:15 p.m.

Sheet A	1	2	3	4	5	6	7	8	9	10	Final
Fallis	0	0	0	1	0	1	X	X	X	X	2
Link 🔨	2	1	3	0	1	0	X	X	X	X	7

Sheet B	1	2	3	4	5	6	7	8	9	10	11	Final
Ursel 🔨	1	1	0	0	1	0	0	3	2	0	0	8
Fortin	0	0	3	1	0	1	1	0	0	2	1	9

Sheet C	1	2	3	4	5	6	7	8	9	10	Final
Strath 🔨	1	1	0	2	2	3	X	X	X	X	9
Park	0	0	1	0	0	0	X	X	X	X	1

Sheet D	1	2	3	4	5	6	7	8	9	10	Final
Brown 🔨	1	0	1	0	0	2	1	0	3	X	8
Spencer	0	2	0	0	2	0	0	1	0	X	5

=== Draw 11 ===
January 8, 4:00 p.m.

Sheet A	1	2	3	4	5	6	7	8	9	10	Final
Stewart	0	0	0	0	1	0	3	0	0	X	4
Rosser 🔨	1	1	0	1	0	1	0	2	3	X	9

Sheet B	1	2	3	4	5	6	7	8	9	10	11	Final
Thurston 🔨	1	0	1	0	0	0	4	0	0	0	1	7
Blixhavn	0	1	0	0	0	1	0	2	1	1	0	6

Sheet C	1	2	3	4	5	6	7	8	9	10	Final
Harvey 🔨	2	0	1	0	1	0	1	0	3	X	8
Carey	0	1	0	1	0	1	0	1	0	X	4

Sheet D	1	2	3	4	5	6	7	8	9	10	Final
Streich 🔨	1	0	3	1	0	1	1	0	0	1	8
Goethe	0	2	0	0	1	0	0	2	1	0	6

=== Draw 12 ===
January 8, 7:45 p.m.

Sheet A	1	2	3	4	5	6	7	8	9	10	Final
Ursel	0	2	1	0	0	1	0	0	2	1	7
Park 🔨	1	0	0	1	1	0	1	1	0	0	5

Sheet B	1	2	3	4	5	6	7	8	9	10	Final
Link	0	2	0	1	1	0	0	1	0	1	6
Brown 🔨	1	0	0	0	0	2	0	0	1	0	4

Sheet C	1	2	3	4	5	6	7	8	9	10	Final
Spencer 🔨	1	0	1	1	0	2	0	2	0	2	9
Fallis	0	1	0	0	2	0	3	0	1	0	7

Sheet D	1	2	3	4	5	6	7	8	9	10	Final
Strath 🔨	3	0	2	1	0	3	X	X	X	X	9
Fortin	0	1	0	0	1	0	X	X	X	X	2

=== Draw 13 ===
January 9, 8:30 a.m.

Sheet A	1	2	3	4	5	6	7	8	9	10	Final
Harvey 🔨	2	1	1	0	4	0	0	1	0	X	9
Thurston	0	0	0	2	0	2	2	0	2	X	8

Sheet B	1	2	3	4	5	6	7	8	9	10	Final
Rosser	0	0	1	1	0	X	X	X	X	X	2
Goethe 🔨	1	3	0	0	2	X	X	X	X	X	6

Sheet C	1	2	3	4	5	6	7	8	9	10	Final
Streich	0	2	0	1	0	3	0	0	2	0	8
Stewart 🔨	1	0	1	0	3	0	2	1	0	2	10

Sheet D	1	2	3	4	5	6	7	8	9	10	Final
Carey 🔨	3	0	3	0	4	X	X	X	X	X	10
Blixhavn	0	1	0	3	0	X	X	X	X	X	4

=== Draw 14 ===
January 9, 12:15 p.m.

Sheet A	1	2	3	4	5	6	7	8	9	10	Final
Spencer 🔨	0	0	1	0	1	0	1	0	0	X	3
Link	0	1	0	1	0	3	0	1	1	X	7

Sheet B	1	2	3	4	5	6	7	8	9	10	Final
Park	0	1	1	1	0	0	5	2	X	X	10
Fortin 🔨	1	0	0	0	0	2	0	0	X	X	3

Sheet C	1	2	3	4	5	6	7	8	9	10	Final
Strath 🔨	3	0	0	3	0	2	0	3	X	X	11
Ursel	0	2	0	0	1	0	2	0	X	X	5

Sheet D	1	2	3	4	5	6	7	8	9	10	Final
Fallis	2	0	1	0	2	0	0	1	0	0	6
Brown 🔨	0	1	0	2	0	2	0	0	0	2	7

== Playoffs ==
Page playoff system
R1	Janet Harvey	9
B1	Kim Link	5
R2	Jill Thurston	11
B2	Joelle Brown	5

Semifinal
B1	Kim Link	9
R2	Jill Thurston	10

Final
R1	Janet Harvey	6
R2	Jill Thurston	7

=== R1 vs. B1 ===
January 9, 7:00 p.m.

Team	1	2	3	4	5	6	7	8	9	10	Final
Harvey	0	0	3	0	0	5	0	0	1	X	9
Link 🔨	0	0	0	1	1	0	1	2	0	X	5

=== R2 vs. B2 ===
January 9, 7:00 p.m.

Team	1	2	3	4	5	6	7	8	9	10	Final
Thurston 🔨	5	0	2	0	0	0	0	4	0	X	11
Brown	0	1	0	1	0	1	0	0	2	X	5

=== Semifinal ===
January 10, 9:30 a.m.

Team	1	2	3	4	5	6	7	8	9	10	11	Final
Link 🔨	2	0	1	0	0	2	0	4	0	0	0	9
Thurston	0	1	0	1	3	0	1	0	2	1	1	10

=== Final ===
January 10, 1:30 p.m.

Team	1	2	3	4	5	6	7	8	9	10	11	Final
Harvey 🔨	2	0	1	1	0	0	0	0	0	2	0	6
Thurston	0	1	0	0	1	2	1	0	1	0	1	7
