= Patti Wuthrich =

Canadian curler

- Curler ♀
- Other names: Patti Vande, Patti Vandekerckhove
- Born: July 17, 1958 (age 68); Winnipeg, Manitoba, Canada

Team
- Curling club: Granite CC (Winnipeg)

Curling career
- Member Association: Canada
- Hearts: 5: (1978, 1979, 1980, 1983, 1996)
- Olympic: 1 (1988) (demo)
Medal record
Curling
Representing Canada
Olympic Games (demonstration)
| Gold medal – first place | 1988 Calgary | Women's |
Representing Manitoba
Scott Tournament of Hearts
| Gold medal – first place | 1978 Sault Ste. Marie |
| Silver medal – second place | 1979 Mount Royal |

Patti Wuthrich (born July 17, 1958, in Winnipeg as Patti "Vande" Vandekerckhove) is a Canadian curler and curling coach from Gimli, Manitoba.

As a junior curler, she won the 1974 Canadian Junior Curling Championships playing second for the Chris Pidzarko rink. She won the 1978 Canadian women's championship playing lead for Cathy Pidzarko.

She competed at the 1988 Winter Olympics when curling was a demonstration sport. The Canadian women's team won the gold medal, defeating Sweden in the final.

Patti Vandekerckhove was inducted into the Canadian Curling Hall of Fame in 1986.

After retirement she began coaching teams on the national and international level, for example the team of Kerri Einarson or the Korean team of Kim Eun-jung.

== Personal life ==
She is married to well-known Canadian ice maker Hans Wuthrich. She is currently the owner of Minerva Tree Farms.

== Teams ==
| Season | Skip | Third | Second | Lead | Alternate | Events |
|---|---|---|---|---|---|---|
| 1973—74 | Chris Pidzarko | Cathy Pidzarko | Patti Vandekerckhove | Barbara Rudolph | | CJCC 1974 (gold) |
| 1975—76 | Patti Vande | Denise Ledoyen | Connie Laliberte | Donna Rogalski | | CJCC 1976 (4th) |
| 1976—77 | Patti Vande | Cindy Jensen | Colleen Clark | Connie Laliberte | | CJCC 1977 (? th) |
| 1977—78 | Cathy Pidzarko | Chris Pidzarko | Iris Armstrong | Patti Vandekerckhove | | STOH 1978 (gold) |
| 1978—79 | Christine Pidzarko | Rose Tanasichuk | Iris Armstrong | Patti Vande | | STOH 1979 (silver) |
| 1979—80 | Donna Brownridge | Patti Vande | Carolyn Hall | Connie Laliberte | | STOH 1980 (7th) |
| 1982—83 | Patti Vande | Carol Dunstone | Iris Armstrong | Maureen Bonar | | STOH 1983 (4th) |
| 1987—88 | Linda Moore | Lindsay Sparkes | Debbie Jones | Penny Ryan | Patti Vande | OG 1988 (gold) |
| 1995—96 | Maureen Bonar | Gerri Cooke | Allyson Bell | Patti Wuthrich | | STOH 1996 (5th) |

== Record as a coach of national teams ==
| Year | Tournament, event | National team | Place |
|---|---|---|---|
| 2014 | 2014 Pacific-Asia Curling Championships | South Korea (women) | 2nd place, silver medalist(s) |

== Record as a coach of club teams ==
| Season | Skip | Event | Place |
|---|---|---|---|
| 2015–16 | Kerri Einarson | 2016 STOH | 4th |
| 2016–17 | Kerri Einarson | 2016 Canada Cup of Curling | 3rd place, bronze medalist(s) |
| 2018–19 | Kerri Einarson | 2018 Canada Cup | 2nd place, silver medalist(s) |
| 2018–19 | Kerri Einarson | 2019 STOH Wild Card Game | 2nd |
| 2019–20 | Kerri Einarson | 2020 STOH | 1st place, gold medalist(s) |
