= Betty Duguid =

Canadian–American curler (1932–2017)

Medal record

Women's Curling

Representing Manitoba

Diamond D Championship
Gold medal – first place	1967 Mount Royal	

Representing Illinois

United States Women's Curling Championship
Silver medal – second place	1977 Wilmette	

USWCA Championship
Gold medal – first place	1972 Grand Forks	
Gold medal – first place	1975 North Brook	

Betty Anne Duguid (née Runner; May 18, 1932 – December 8, 2017) was a Canadian–American curler. She skipped the winning Manitoba rink at the 1967 Canadian women's curling championship, and won the 1972 and 1975 U.S. Women's Curling Association Championship, becoming the first woman to win a national curling championship for two countries.

== Curling career ==
=== Canada ===
Duguid grew up in Manitoba, and began curling at 10 years old.

Duguid formed a rink with Joan Ingram, Laurie Bradawski and Dot Rose in the early 1960s, winning the aggretate title of the MLCA Bonspiel in 1963 and 1965. The team curled together for playdown play in 1966, making it to that year's Manitoba Championships. In the 1967, they won the provincial championship, going undefeated in their playdown journey. In the Manitoba final, they defeated 1965 Canadian champion Peggy Casselman. The team, nicknamed "the Bear and her cubs" represented Manitoba at the 1967 Diamond D Championship, the national women's championship, where they continued their undefeated record to claim the championship. From club playdowns to the national championship, the team won 27 straight games. The rink was inducted into the Manitoba Curling Hall of Fame in 1992.

=== United States ===
After winning the Diamond D Championship, Duguid and her husband Gerry moved to Wilmette, Illinois to operate the Curtis Curling Center. After it went out of business, they began running the Exmoor Country Club in Highland Park, Illinois. Duguid and her rink of Joanne Miller, Marcia Heckler and Judy McCabe won her "second national title" when they won the United States Women's Curling Association bonspiel championship in 1972, a forerunner to the United States Women's Curling Championship, defeating June Krumholz (also of Illinois) in the final. It was the first time a woman had won the national curling championships for two different countries. At the 1973 USWCA bonspiel, her rink recorded a rare eight-ender in their first match. Duguid won a second U.S. championship in 1975, when her rink of Becky Ruby, Judy McCabe and Leslie DiTomasso defeated Mary Helen Dryden from Grand Forks, North Dakota in the final.

Duguid represented Illinois in the first official United States Women's Curling Championship in 1977, where her team finished tied for second place with a 4–3 record. She represented Illinois again at the 1978 U.S. championship, where she finished tied four fourth with a 3–4 record.

Her team qualified for the 1987 United States Olympic curling trials, though she could not play as she was not a citizen. She coached the team instead.

Over the course of her career, Duguid won the Midwest Curling Association Women's Championship in 1977, 1978 and 1987, and Midwest mixed championships in 1982 and 1983.

== Personal life ==
At the time of her 1967 national championship, Duguid was a housewife. Duguid was married to football player Gerry Duguid, and had three children. In Illinois, she worked for the Wilmette Park District, including being Lakefront Manager. Her brother-in-law was World Champion curler and broadcaster Don Duguid. She died in 2017 at the Skokie Valley Hospital in Skokie, Illinois. She was interred in Treherne, Manitoba.
