= Iris Armstrong =

Canadian curler

- Curler ♀
- Born: Melville, Saskatchewan, Canada

Team
- Curling club: Stony Mountain CC (Stony Mountain, MB), Granite CC (Winnipeg)

Curling career
- Member Association: Canada
- Hearts: 3: (1978, 1979, 1983)
Medal record
Curling
Representing Manitoba
Scott Tournament of Hearts
Gold medal – first place	1978 Sault Ste. Marie
Silver medal – second place	1979 Mount Royal

Iris Armstrong (born in Melville, Saskatchewan) is a Canadian curler from Winnipeg.

She won the 1978 Canadian women's championship playing second for Cathy Pidzarko.

Iris Armstrong was inducted into the Manitoba Curling Hall of Fame twice: in 2005 as a curler and in 2014 as a member of the 1978 Macdonald Lassies championship team, skipped by Cathy Pidzarko.

== Teams ==
Season	Skip	Third	Second	Lead	Events
1977—78	Cathy Pidzarko	Chris Pidzarko	Iris Armstrong	Patti Vandekerckhove	STOH 1978 (gold)
1978—79	Christine Pidzarko	Rose Tanasichuk	Iris Armstrong	Patti Vande	STOH 1979 (silver)
1982—83	Patti Vande	Carol Dunstone	Iris Armstrong	Maureen Bonar	STOH 1983 (4th)

== Personal life ==
She was born in Melville, Saskatchewan. In 1955, her family moved to Winnipeg. She started competitive curling in 1971. Her son Doug Armstrong was on the 1999 Labatt Brier championship team that won a silver medal at the 1999 World Men's Curling Championship. She was married to Keith Armstrong, who died in 2017.
