= 1967 Diamond D Championship =

Canadian women's curling championship

1967 Diamond "D" Championship
- Host city: Mount Royal, Quebec
- Arena: Town of Mount Royal Arena
- Dates: February 27 – March 2
- Winner: Manitoba
- Curling club: Fort Garry Business Girls CC, Fort Garry
- Skip: Betty Duguid
- Third: Joan Ingram
- Second: Laurie Bradawaski
- Lead: Dot Rose

The 1967 Diamond "D" Championship the Canadian women's curling championship was held from February 27 to March 2, 1967 at the Town of Mount Royal Arena in Mount Royal, Quebec.

Team Manitoba, who was skipped by Betty Duguid won the event by finishing round robin play unbeaten with a 9–0 record. This was Manitoba's second championship in three years with Manitoba's previous title coming in 1965. This was the second consecutive championship in which the championship rink finished unbeaten and the fourth time overall.

Quebec's 14–13 victory Prince Edward Island in Draw 1 tied the record for the highest combined score by both teams in one game with 27. This tied the record set in 1963 as Ontario defeated New Brunswick by the same score.

This would also be the last women's championship that was sponsored by Dominion Stores as the tournament organizers were unable to reach a compromise with the sponsor.

== Teams ==
The teams are listed as follows:

Alberta	British Columbia	Manitoba	New Brunswick	Newfoundland
Stampede Ladies CC, Calgary Skip: Kay Berreth; Third: Marge Rodger; Second: Violet Salt; Lead: Evelyn Robertson	Kitimat CC, Kitimat Skip: Joy Mitchell; Third: Polly Mitchell; Second: Verle McKeown; Lead: Sheila Phillips	Fort Garry Business Girls CC, Fort Garry Skip: Betty Duguid; Third: Joan Ingram; Second: Laurie Bradawaski; Lead: Dot Rose	Bathurst Ladies CC, Bathurst Skip: Shirley Pilson; Third: Anne Orser; Second: Helen Gammon; Lead: Geraldine Lenihan	Grand Falls CC, Grand Falls Skip: Violet Pike; Third: Gladys Clarke; Second: Caroline Ball; Lead: Joanne Goodyear
Nova Scotia	Ontario	Prince Edward Island	Quebec	Saskatchewan
Greenwood CC, Greenwood Skip: Helen Rowe; Third: Donna Herron; Second: June Clow; Lead: Jean Mortley	Kenora CC, Kenora Skip: June Shaw; Third: Shirley Wiebe; Second: Dorothy Holmgren; Lead: Joan LeCain	Charlottetown CC, Charlottetown Skip: Elizabeth MacDonald; Third: Marie Toole; Second: Barbara Squarebriggs; Lead: Peggy Dalziel	Pointe Claire CC, Pointe-Claire Skip: Shirley Bradford; Third: June Neville; Second: Patricia Berry; Lead: Patricia Johnson	Caledonian CC, Regina Skip: Betty Clarke; Third: Enid Anderson; Second: Jean Broeder; Lead: Beverly Langton

== Map of teams ==
Provincial Winners

== Round robin standings ==
Final Round Robin standings

Key
Diamond D champion

Province	Skip	W	L	PF	PA
Manitoba	Betty Duguid	9	0	94	57
Quebec	Shirley Bradford	7	2	94	60
New Brunswick	Shirley Pilson	5	4	67	77
Ontario	June Shaw	5	4	75	64
Saskatchewan	Betty Clarke	5	4	76	74
Alberta	Kay Berreth	4	5	68	74
British Columbia	Joy Mitchell	4	5	85	60
Newfoundland	Violet Pike	2	7	65	93
Nova Scotia	Helen Rowe	2	7	54	84
Prince Edward Island	Elizabeth MacDonald	2	7	55	90

== Round robin results ==
All draw times are listed in Eastern Standard Time (UTC−05:00).

=== Draw 1 ===
Monday, February 27, 2:00 pm

Team	1	2	3	4	5	6	7	8	9	10	Final
Nova Scotia (Rowe)	0	0	0	0	3	0	1	0	2	0	6
Alberta (Berreth)	2	1	0	4	0	2	0	1	0	1	11

Team	1	2	3	4	5	6	7	8	9	10	Final
Ontario (Shaw)	0	0	3	1	0	0	2	0	1	0	7
Manitoba (Duguid)	3	2	0	0	1	2	0	1	0	3	12

Team	1	2	3	4	5	6	7	8	9	10	Final
Newfoundland (Pike)	2	1	0	0	1	0	1	0	1	1	7
New Brunswick (Pilson)	0	0	1	1	0	3	0	3	0	0	8

Team	1	2	3	4	5	6	7	8	9	10	11	Final
British Columbia (Mitchell)	1	0	1	0	0	1	0	0	2	2	0	7
Saskatchewan (Clarke)	0	2	0	1	1	0	2	1	0	0	1	8

Team	1	2	3	4	5	6	7	8	9	10	Final
Quebec (Bradford)	0	4	0	2	2	0	2	1	3	0	14
Prince Edward Island (MacDonald)	2	0	5	0	0	5	0	0	0	1	13

=== Draw 2 ===
Monday, February 27, 8:00 pm

Team	1	2	3	4	5	6	7	8	9	10	Final
Prince Edward Island (MacDonald)	1	0	1	3	1	0	1	0	5	X	12
Saskatchewan (Clarke)	0	0	0	0	0	2	0	1	0	X	3

Team	1	2	3	4	5	6	7	8	9	10	Final
Newfoundland (Pike)	2	1	0	1	0	0	1	0	0	0	5
British Columbia (Mitchell)	0	0	2	0	2	2	0	3	2	1	12

Team	1	2	3	4	5	6	7	8	9	10	Final
Manitoba (Duguid)	1	1	0	3	0	0	2	0	3	X	10
Alberta (Berreth)	0	0	2	0	1	1	0	1	0	X	5

Team	1	2	3	4	5	6	7	8	9	10	Final
Quebec (Bradford)	0	1	0	3	0	5	0	1	0	0	10
Nova Scotia (Rowe)	1	0	1	0	1	0	1	0	0	1	5

Team	1	2	3	4	5	6	7	8	9	10	Final
Ontario (Shaw)	0	2	1	0	0	0	2	0	0	1	6
New Brunswick (Pilson)	1	0	0	1	1	2	0	2	1	0	8

=== Draw 3 ===
Tuesday, February 28, 2:00 pm

Team	1	2	3	4	5	6	7	8	9	10	Final
Quebec (Bradford)	0	1	1	0	0	0	3	0	0	X	5
Manitoba (Duguid)	1	0	0	1	1	2	0	2	2	X	9

Team	1	2	3	4	5	6	7	8	9	10	Final
Nova Scotia (Rowe)	0	0	0	1	0	1	0	1	0	1	4
New Brunswick (Pilson)	0	0	3	0	1	0	2	0	1	0	7

Team	1	2	3	4	5	6	7	8	9	10	Final
Ontario (Shaw)	0	0	2	4	0	0	2	0	1	0	9
Saskatchewan (Clarke)	0	1	0	0	2	2	0	1	0	1	7

Team	1	2	3	4	5	6	7	8	9	10	Final
Newfoundland (Pike)	1	0	2	0	0	2	0	0	0	1	6
Prince Edward Island (MacDonald)	0	1	0	4	0	0	1	1	0	0	7

Team	1	2	3	4	5	6	7	8	9	10	Final
British Columbia (Mitchell)	2	0	0	1	0	0	0	0	3	0	6
Alberta (Berreth)	0	1	1	0	1	1	1	1	0	3	9

=== Draw 4 ===
Tuesday, February 28, 8:30 pm

Team	1	2	3	4	5	6	7	8	9	10	Final
Manitoba (Duguid)	1	2	4	0	0	0	2	4	0	X	13
Newfoundland (Pike)	0	0	0	3	3	1	0	0	2	X	9

Team	1	2	3	4	5	6	7	8	9	10	Final
Alberta (Berreth)	0	0	0	3	0	0	0	1	1	X	5
Saskatchewan (Clarke)	1	1	3	0	1	1	1	0	0	X	8

Team	1	2	3	4	5	6	7	8	9	10	Final
Quebec (Bradford)	0	0	1	0	2	1	0	0	0	X	4
Ontario (Shaw)	2	0	0	0	0	0	2	3	1	X	8

Team	1	2	3	4	5	6	7	8	9	10	Final
Nova Scotia (Rowe)	1	1	1	0	1	1	0	0	2	X	7
Prince Edward Island (MacDonald)	0	0	0	1	0	0	1	2	0	X	4

Team	1	2	3	4	5	6	7	8	9	10	Final
British Columbia (Mitchell)	1	0	1	0	0	0	1	1	3	1	8
New Brunswick (Pilson)	0	1	0	1	1	3	0	0	0	0	6

=== Draw 5 ===
Wednesday, March 1, 9:00 am

Team	1	2	3	4	5	6	7	8	9	10	Final
Nova Scotia (Rowe)	1	0	1	0	1	0	1	1	0	0	5
Manitoba (Duguid)	0	2	0	3	0	2	0	0	2	1	10

Team	1	2	3	4	5	6	7	8	9	10	Final
New Brunswick (Pilson)	0	1	0	3	0	1	0	1	0	2	8
Saskatchewan (Clarke)	1	0	1	0	3	0	4	0	1	0	10

Team	1	2	3	4	5	6	7	8	9	10	Final
Newfoundland (Pike)	1	0	0	5	0	4	0	3	0	0	13
Ontario (Shaw)	0	1	0	0	4	0	1	0	4	1	11

Team	1	2	3	4	5	6	7	8	9	10	Final
Prince Edward Island (MacDonald)	0	0	1	3	1	0	0	0	1	X	6
Alberta (Berreth)	2	1	0	0	0	1	4	2	0	X	10

Team	1	2	3	4	5	6	7	8	9	10	Final
Quebec (Bradford)	1	0	0	2	2	0	0	2	0	1	8
British Columbia (Mitchell)	0	1	1	0	0	2	1	0	2	0	7

=== Draw 6 ===
Wednesday, March 1, 2:00 pm

Team	1	2	3	4	5	6	7	8	9	10	Final
Nova Scotia (Rowe)	0	0	1	0	1	0	0	0	0	X	2
British Columbia (Mitchell)	0	1	0	4	0	1	3	3	1	X	13

Team	1	2	3	4	5	6	7	8	9	10	11	Final
Manitoba (Duguid)	0	0	1	2	2	0	0	1	0	1	1	8
Saskatchewan (Clarke)	1	1	0	0	0	1	1	0	3	0	0	7

Team	1	2	3	4	5	6	7	8	9	10	Final
Prince Edward Island (MacDonald)	1	0	1	2	0	0	0	0	0	X	4
New Brunswick (Pilson)	0	2	0	0	2	1	5	1	1	X	12

Team	1	2	3	4	5	6	7	8	9	10	Final
Ontario (Shaw)	2	2	1	0	3	0	1	0	0	X	9
Alberta (Berreth)	0	0	0	2	0	3	0	1	1	X	7

Team	1	2	3	4	5	6	7	8	9	10	Final
Quebec (Bradford)	0	1	1	0	4	2	0	3	2	X	13
Newfoundland (Pike)	3	0	0	2	0	0	1	0	0	X	6

=== Draw 7 ===
Wednesday, March 1, 8:30 pm

Team	1	2	3	4	5	6	7	8	9	10	Final
Ontario (Shaw)	1	1	1	1	1	4	1	0	3	X	13
Prince Edward Island (MacDonald)	0	0	0	0	0	0	0	2	0	X	2

Team	1	2	3	4	5	6	7	8	9	10	Final
Newfoundland (Pike)	1	0	2	0	0	0	1	0	0	X	4
Alberta (Berreth)	0	2	0	3	0	1	0	1	1	X	8

Team	1	2	3	4	5	6	7	8	9	10	Final
British Columbia (Mitchell)	0	3	0	5	0	1	2	0	0	0	11
Manitoba (Duguid)	0	0	6	0	2	0	0	1	3	1	13

Team	1	2	3	4	5	6	7	8	9	10	Final
Quebec (Bradford)	2	1	2	1	2	0	3	5	X	X	16
New Brunswick (Pilson)	0	0	0	0	0	3	0	0	X	X	3

Team	1	2	3	4	5	6	7	8	9	10	Final
Nova Scotia (Rowe)	2	0	2	1	0	3	0	0	1	0	9
Saskatchewan (Clarke)	0	2	0	0	4	0	2	4	0	2	14

=== Draw 8 ===
Thursday, March 2, 2:00 pm

Team	1	2	3	4	5	6	7	8	9	10	11	Final
New Brunswick (Pilson)	1	0	5	4	0	0	0	0	1	0	1	12
Alberta (Berreth)	0	1	0	0	2	1	0	2	0	5	0	11

Team	1	2	3	4	5	6	7	8	9	10	Final
Quebec (Bradford)	3	2	0	3	0	0	0	2	1	X	11
Saskatchewan (Clarke)	0	0	2	0	1	1	3	0	0	X	7

Team	1	2	3	4	5	6	7	8	9	10	Final
Newfoundland (Pike)	0	2	0	2	1	0	0	3	0	2	10
Nova Scotia (Rowe)	1	0	4	0	0	1	2	0	1	0	9

Team	1	2	3	4	5	6	7	8	9	10	Final
British Columbia (Mitchell)	1	0	1	0	1	0	1	0	0	X	4
Ontario (Shaw)	0	2	0	1	0	1	0	1	2	X	7

Team	1	2	3	4	5	6	7	8	9	10	Final
Manitoba (Duguid)	0	2	0	2	0	0	2	1	1	X	8
Prince Edward Island (MacDonald)	2	0	1	0	0	2	0	0	0	X	5

=== Draw 9 ===
Thursday, March 3, 8:30 pm

Team	1	2	3	4	5	6	7	8	9	10	Final
Newfoundland (Pike)	0	0	2	0	1	0	2	0	0	X	5
Saskatchewan (Clarke)	0	1	0	1	0	5	0	3	2	X	12

Team	1	2	3	4	5	6	7	8	9	10	Final
British Columbia (Mitchell)	0	2	2	1	0	3	3	3	3	X	17
Prince Edward Island (MacDonald)	1	0	0	0	1	0	0	0	0	X	2

Team	1	2	3	4	5	6	7	8	9	10	Final
Quebec (Bradford)	1	0	0	5	1	1	2	3	X	X	13
Alberta (Berreth)	0	1	1	0	0	0	0	0	X	X	2

Team	1	2	3	4	5	6	7	8	9	10	Final
Manitoba (Duguid)	2	1	3	0	2	0	1	0	2	X	11
New Brunswick (Pilson)	0	0	0	1	0	1	0	1	0	X	3

Team	1	2	3	4	5	6	7	8	9	10	Final
Nova Scotia (Rowe)	1	2	1	1	0	0	1	0	0	1	7
Ontario (Shaw)	0	0	0	0	1	1	0	0	3	0	5
