= Cathy Shaw =

Canadian curler

Medal record

Representing Manitoba

Scott Tournament of Hearts
Gold medal – first place	1978 Sault Ste. Marie	

Representing Alberta
Silver medal – second place	1983 Prince George	

Catherine "Cathy" Shaw (née Pidzarko; born c. 1953) is a Canadian curler, originally from Winnipeg, Manitoba.

While attending Miles Macdonell Collegiate, Shaw and her twin sister, Chris won three straight provincial junior championships (1972–1974) and won two Canadian Junior Curling Championships (1972 & 1974). Shaw played third on the team that was skipped by her sister.

In 1978, Shaw skipped a team which included her sister at third, Iris Armstrong at second and Patti Vande at lead which won the Manitoba Lassie provincial championship and then won the 1978 Macdonald Lassies Championship, the national women's curling championship at the time.

Shaw moved to Yellowknife, Northwest Territories and won the territorial championship in 1980 playing with Donna Alexander, Lee Brooks and Marilyn Paradis. The team represented the Northwest Territories/Yukon at the 1980 Canadian Ladies Curling Association Championship, finishing with a 5–6 record. Shaw then moved to Edmonton, Alberta and won the Alberta Scott Tournament of Hearts with teammates Karen Jones, Sandra Rippel (Jenkins) and Donna Martineau. The team represented Alberta at the 1982 Scott Tournament of Hearts, where they finished the round robin in a five-way tie at 7–3. However, they would lose to Saskatchewan's Arleen Day in a tie breaker. The team won the Alberta championship again in 1983, and would represent the province at the 1983 Scott Tournament of Hearts. There they had more success, losing in the final against Nova Scotia's Penny LaRocque rink. They had finished the round robin with another 7–3 record, but were in sole possession of third place. They then beat the Northwest Territories/Yukon team skipped by Shelly Bildfell in the semi-final before losing to Nova Scotia.

Shaw currently lives in Toronto. She still curls competitively in Ontario, having skipped teams at the 2015 Ontario Masters and 2015 Ontario Seniors championships.
