= Thistle Curling Club (Winnipeg) =

Premier curling rink in Winnipeg, Canada

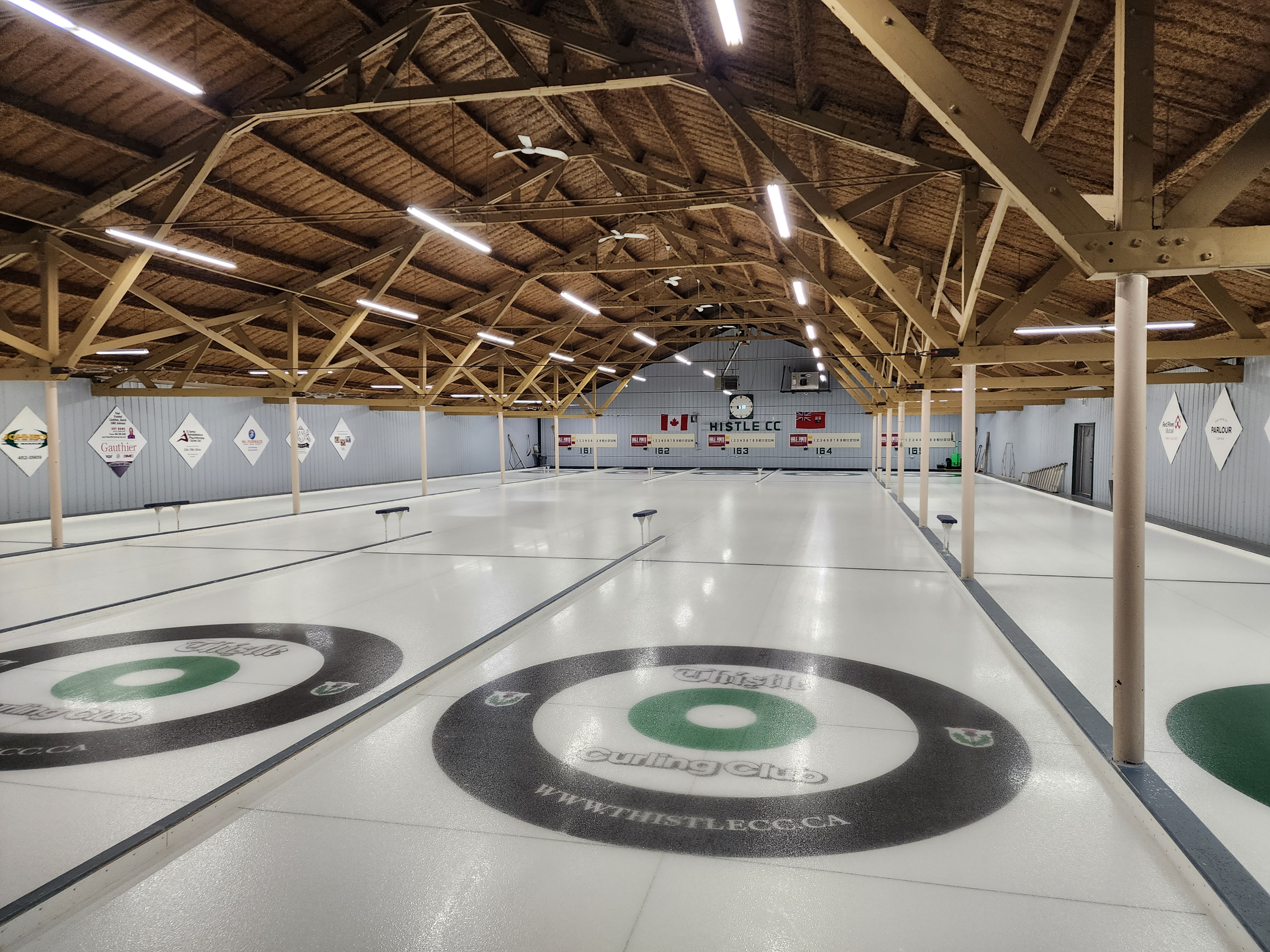
- The interior of the former Thistle Curling Club building on Burnell.
- Interactive map of Thistle Curling Club
- Location: 280 Burnell Street; Winnipeg, Manitoba R3G 2A7; Canada; 49.8861°N 97.1713°W

Information
- Established: 1887 (first building); 2006 (current building)
- Sheets of ice: Five
- Website: https://www.granitecurlingclub.ca/

The Thistle Curling Club (also known as The Thistle), located in Winnipeg, Manitoba, is the second oldest curling club in Manitoba.

== History ==
The original Thistle Curling Club was founded in 1887 by curlers who separated from The Granite Curling Club. In 2006 the Thistle's building was burned in a fire causing a loss of all the clubs irreplaceable historical regalia including photos and trophies. The club then moved into the building of the Valour Curling Club merging memberships and taking over the location on Burnell Street. In 2023 the club announced that they would be selling the land and building at the Burnell Street location and merge with the location at Deer Lodge Curling Club to the west. The two clubs would retain their history and identity but continue to operate out of the same facility beginning in the fall of 2023.
