= Winkler Arena =

Multi-purpose arena in Winkler, Manitoba

Coordinates: 49.1881°N 97.9459°W

Winkler Centennial Arena
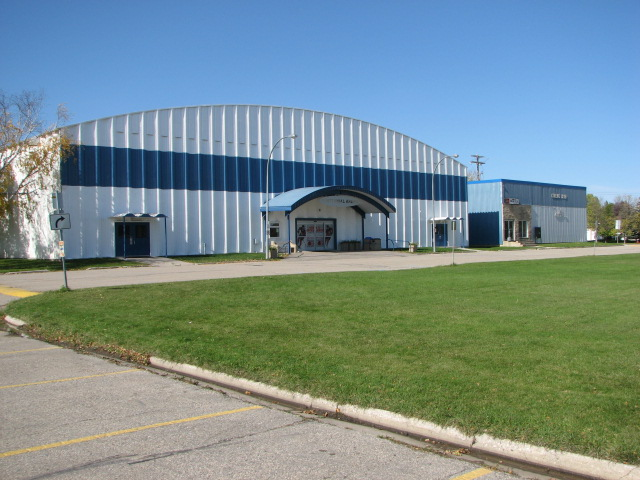
- Interactive map of Winkler Centennial Arena
- Location: 600 Park St Winkler, Manitoba
- Owner: City of Winkler
- Operator: City of Winkler
- Capacity: 2,000 (hockey)

Construction
- Opened: 1967

Tenant
- Winkler Flyers (MJHL) (1980-present)

The Winkler Centennial Arena, formerly known as the Winkler Recreation Complex and commonly referred to as the Winkler Arena, is a 2,000-seat multi-purpose arena located in Winkler, Manitoba, Canada. It serves as the home venue for the Winkler Flyers of the Manitoba Junior Hockey League. The Winkler Arena is Winkler's premier hockey facility. It is located next to the Winkler Aquatic Centre and the Winkler Curling Club.

On February 9, 2008, CBC's annual Hockey Day In Canada broadcast was hosted from Winkler Centennial Arena.

The 2015 Scotties Tournament of Hearts Provincial Championship was held at the Winkler Centennial Arena. The event ran from January 21–25.

The 2018 Viterra Championship was hosted in Winkler Centennial Arena. The event ran from January 31-February 4.

Winkler's two high schools play their home games in the arena: the Garden Valley Collegiate Zodiacs and the Northlands Parkway Collegiate Nighthawks.

== Sources ==
- Hildebrand, Ty (24 February 2026). "Historic weekend ahead for Flyers in newly renovated Centennial Arena". PembinaValleyOnline.
- Hildebrand, Ty (5 March 2026). "Inside the renovated Centennial Arena with Flyer forward Niklas Gudmunson". PembinaValleyOnline.
- Anthony, Dave (7 March 2026). "Bigger than the game: Flyers welcome community to revamped Centennial Arena". PembinaValleyOnline.
- Anthony, Dave (18 September 2026). "Flyers set to soar into 2026-27 regular season". PembinaValleyOnline.
