= Brandon Curling Club =

Curling club located in Brandon, Manitoba, Canada

The Brandon Curling Club is a curling club located in Brandon, Manitoba, Canada. The club is one of four in the city.

The club was founded in 1889-90 at the corner of Victoria Ave and 18th St in Downtown Brandon. The club was moved further south in 1953 to the Provincial Exhibition Grounds. Three years later, a fire destroyed the rink, but it as re-built by Fall 1956. Two years later, artificial ice was installed, before fire destroyed the rink once again in 1964. Four months after the fire, it was once again rebuilt. The club was re-located to a different site at the exhibition grounds in 1969-70.

The club was added to the Keystone Centre arena in 1992, becoming an 8 sheet club in the process.

== Provincial champions ==
=== Men's ===
Brandon Curling Club teams have won two men's provincial championships. In 1987, Brian Fowler, Keith Kyle, Dale Wallace and Gary Poole won the title, and finished 6-5 at the 1987 Labatt Brier. Rob Fowler, Allan Lyburn, Richard Daneault and Derek Samagalski won the 2012 Safeway Championship and would go on to win a bronze medal at the 2012 Tim Hortons Brier.

=== Women's ===
The Brandon Curling Club has won the Manitoba Scotties Tournament of Hearts six times: 1968 (Mabel Mitchell, Shirley Bray, Mildred Murray, June Clark), 1971 (Mabel Mitchell, Mildred Murray, Evelyn Bird, June Clark), 1972 (Audrey Williamson, Mabel Mitchell, Flo Yeo, Dru Dickens), 1993 (Maureen Bonar, Lois Fowler, Allyson Bell, Rhonda Fowler), 1996 (Maureen Bonar, Gerri Cooke, Allyson Bell, Lois Fowler), and 1998 (Lois Fwoler, Betty Couling, Shawon Fowler, Jocelyn Beever).

=== Juniors ===
Brandon Curling Club teams won the provincial junior men's championship in 1960 (Don Pottinger, Wes Hoffman, Jim Poole, Reid Lumbard), 1998 (Mike McEwen, David Chalmers, Bryce Granger, Kevin Schmidt) and 2001 (Mike McEwen, Denni Neufeld, Geordie Hargreaves, Nolan Thiessen).

The club also won the 1998 provincial junior women's championship with Lisa Roy, Amy Rafnkelsson, Jamie Coxworth and Kerry Maynes.

=== Seniors ===
Brandon Curling Club teams won the provincial senior men's championship in 1979 (Eldon McLean, Clarence McFadyen, Harold McFadyen, Alf Poole), 1993 (Frank Gudz, Norm Hemstad, Gene Cory, Davy Rudy) and 2004 (Neil Andrews, Darryl Andrews, Jim Horn, Doug Carvey).

The club won the provincial women's senior championship in 1970 (Eva Loney, Eileen Marsden, Marge Flewitt, Isabel McAllum), 1983 (Mabel Mitchell, Mary Adams, Mildred Murray, June Clark), 1984 (Mabel Mitchell, Mary Adams, Midred Murray, June Clark), 1985 (Shirley Bray, Myrna Graham, Irene Fingas, Anne Mackay), 1987 (Mabel Mitchell, Mary Adams, Mildred Murray, June Clark), 2001 (Linda Van Daele, Joyce McDougall, Evelyn Clegg, Jean Ungarian), 2005 (Linsa Van Daele, Betty Couling, Evelyn Clegg, Jean Ungarian), 2009 (Lois Fowler, Gwen Wooley, Lori Manning, Lynn Sandercook), 2010 (Linda Van Daele, Betty Couling, Sharon Shannon, Liliane Fargey) and 2013 (Lois Fowler, Gwen Wooley, Lori Manning, Joan Robertson).

Mabel Mitchell's 1983 rink also won the Canadian Senior Curling Championship for Manitoba.

=== Mixed ===
Brandon Curling Club teams won the provincial mixed championship in 1975 (Larry Taylor, Shirley Bray, Don Pottinger, Mary Adams), 1998 (Rob Fowler, Lois Fowler, Mark Taylor, Sharon Fowler), 2003 (Mike McEwen, Amber Dawson, Geordie Hargreaves, Kristen Williamson), 2004 (Terry McNamee, Jill Officer, Brendan Taylor, Tanya Robins), 2005 (Terry McNamee, Tasha Hunter, Brendan Taylor, Tanya Robins) and 2012 (Terry McNamee, Kerri Einarson, Kyle Einarson, Stacey Fordyce)

=== Other ===
The club won the women's Dominion Curling Club Championship (now known as the Travelers Curling Club Championship) in 2013 with curlers Stacey Fordyce, Cristy Erickson, Stacey Irwin and Pam Gouldie. The club won the event again in 2017 with the same team.
