= Deer Lodge Curling Club =

Premier curling rink in Winnipeg, Canada

- Interactive map of Deer Lodge Curling Club
- Location: 425 Woodlawn Avenue; Winnipeg, Manitoba R3J 2J3; Canada; 49.8858°N 97.2330°W

Information
- Established: 1919
- Club type: Dedicated ice
- Curling Canada region: Curl Manitoba
- Sheets of ice: Six
- Website: https://deerlodgecurlingclub.ca/

The Deer Lodge Curling Club located in Winnipeg, Manitoba, is a six-sheet curling club located in the west part of the city. The club was established in 1919 and moved to the current location in the 1950s. In 2023, the Thistle Curling Club announced that they would be selling their location and merging their club with Deer Lodge Curling Club. The two clubs would retain their history and identity but continue to operate out of the same facility beginning in the fall of 2023. Barry Fry curled out of Deer Lodge Curling Club when he won the 1979 Macdonald Brier, going on to win bronze at the 1979 World Championships.
