= Hans Wuthrich (icemaker) =

Swiss-Canadian curling ice technician

Hans R. Wüthrich is a Swiss-Canadian top curling ice technician.

Born in Brügglen, Switzerland, Wuthrich emigrated to Canada in 1976, when he was 19.

He has been making ice since 1993 for major events around the world such as the Brier and World Curling Championships. Wuthrich was the recipient of the 2003 Canadian Curling Association's 'Award of Achievement' for his significant contributions in the development of new pebble heads and ice scraper technology. He lives in Gimli, Manitoba.

On June 11, 2007, the World Curling Federation announced that Wuthrich was appointed as the technician in charge of the curling sheets at the 2010 Winter Olympics in Vancouver, British Columbia, Canada. Dave Merklinger, of New Westminster, was his assistant.

Wuthrich was the technician in charge of the ice at the 2014 Winter Olympics in Sochi, Russia. He was the Chief Ice Technician at the 2018 Winter Olympics and the 2022 Winter Olympics.
