= Maureen Bonar =

Canadian curler

- Curler
- Born: February 18, 1963 (age 63); Deloraine, Manitoba

Team
- Curling club: East St. Paul CC, East St. Paul, MB
- Skip: Kim Link
- Third: Maureen Bonar
- Second: Colleen Kilgallen
- Lead: Renee Fletcher
- Alternate: Pam Kolton

Curling career
- Hearts: 5 (1983, 1993, 1996, 1998, 2004)
Medal record
Curling
Representing Canada
World Senior Curling Championships
| Gold medal – first place | 2015 Sochi |
Representing Manitoba
Scott Tournament of Hearts
| Silver medal – second place | 1993 Brandon |

Maureen S. Bonar (/ˈbɒnər/ BON-ər); (born February 18, 1963 in Deloraine, Manitoba) is a Canadian curler from Brandon, Manitoba. Bonar is a four time provincial champion- twice as a skip.

In 2009 Bonar was inducted into the Manitoba Curling Hall of Fame.

== Curling career ==
After having won the 1982 provincial junior championships as skip, (and finishing 6–4 at the 1982 Canadian Junior Women's Curling Championship) Bonar joined up with Patti Vande as her lead and won the 1983 provincial championships earning them the right to represent Manitoba at the 1983 Scott Tournament of Hearts. The team finished 6-4, and out of the playoffs.

Ten years later, Bonar won her second provincial championships - this time as skip. At the 1993 Scott Tournament of Hearts, Bonar lost in the final to Saskatchewan's Sandra Schmirler (then Peterson).

Bonar won her third provincial championships in 1996. At the 1996 Scott Tournament of Hearts, Bonar finished 6-5 and lost in a tie-breaker against her provincial rivals, team Connie Laliberte who won the Hearts the year before. In 1997, Laliberte had Bonar join her team as an alternate in their failed attempt to qualify for the 1998 Winter Olympics.

Bonar won her last provincial championships in 2004 playing second for Lois Fowler. The team finished in fourth place, after losing in the page 3v4 game to Marie-France Larouche of Quebec at the 2004 Scott Tournament of Hearts.

== Personal life ==
Bonar's brother Dan is a hockey player who played for the Los Angeles Kings. She attended the University of Manitoba.
