= Chris Scalena =

Canadian curler

Medal record

Representing Canada

Women's Curling

World Championships
Gold medal – first place	1984 Duluth	

Representing Manitoba

Scotties Tournament of Hearts
Gold medal – first place	1984 Charlottetown	
Gold medal – first place	1978 Sault Ste. Marie	
Silver medal – second place	1989 Kelowna	
Silver medal – second place	1979 Mount Royal	

Christine M. "Chris" Scalena, (née Pidzarko; born c. 1953) is a Canadian hall of fame curler from Winnipeg, Manitoba. She was known for much of her competitive career as Chris More.

Scalena is a three-time provincial junior champion, winning in 1972, 1973 and 1974. She skipped Manitoba in three Canadian Junior Curling Championships, winning the event in 1972 and 1974. In 1973, she finished 2nd place. In 1974, she defeated British Columbia's Linda Tweedie (Moore) in a tie-break to win the championship.

== Titles ==
Scalena won four provincial women's titles in her career: 1978, 1979, 1984 and 1989. In 1978, she played third for her twin sister Cathy's rink, and the team won the national championship. In 1979, she skipped Manitoba at the 1979 Macdonald Lassies Championship, where she lost in the final to British Columbia's Lindsay Sparkes. In 1984, Scalena returned to the national championship playing third for Connie Laliberte at the 1984 Scott Tournament of Hearts. The team defeated Nova Scotia's Colleen Jones in the final, sending the team to the 1984 World Women's Curling Championship, representing Canada. At the 1984 Worlds, the team won the gold medal, after defeating Switzerland's Brigitte Kienast in the final. Scalena made her final appearance at the Hearts in 1989, this time skipping the Manitoba team. At the 1989 Scott Tournament of Hearts, Scalena had another successful tournament, finishing first after the round robin, only to lose to the defending champion Heather Houston rink in the final.

In addition to her national women's titles, Scalena won a provincial mixed title in 1983, playing third for Bill Carey.

Scalena was inducted into the Canadian Curling Hall of Fame in 1988. As of 2014, Scalena still curls recreationally at the Thistle Curling Club in Winnipeg.
