= Nini Mutch =

Canadian curler (c.1930–2019)

Medal record

Women's Curling

Representing Ontario

Macdonald Lassies Championship
Silver medal – second place	1977 Halifax	

Jeannine May "Nini" Mutch (c. 1930–November 15, 2019) was a Canadian curler.

Mutch won two Ontario provincial mixed championships, in 1967 and 1970. In both years, she played on rinks skipped by Earle Hushagen, playing third in 1967 and lead in 1970. The team represented Ontario at the 1967 and 1970 Canadian Mixed Curling Championships. In 1967, they finished tied for second place with a 7–3 record In 1970, they finished in fourth place with a 6–4 record.

In women's curling, Mutch skipping a team of Wyn Hushagen, Doris McKenzie and Rosina Lewicke, won the Ontario provincial women's championship in 1977, going undefeated with a 5–0 record. The team also included Sheila MacIsaac who replaced Lewicke mid-way through the tournament due to a back injury. This qualified her rink to represent Ontario at the 1977 Macdonald Lassies Championship, Canada's national women's curling championship. At the Lassies, she led her team to a second place finish, with an 8–2 record. One of her wins was against the champion Alberta rink, skipped by Myrna McQuarrie, giving Alberta their lone loss. The win came after Alberta had already clinched the tournament, but dashed their hopes of going undefeated.

== Personal life ==
Mutch was a housewife, and lived in Etobicoke during her curling career. She was married to Ron Mutch, and had two children. In addition to curling, she also cross country skied, played tennis and golfed. She volunteered at the Collingwood General and Marine Hospital in Collingwood, Ontario for over 30 years. She died in Collingwood in 2019.
