= 1979 Macdonald Lassies Championship =

Canadian women's curling championship

- Host city: Mount Royal, Quebec
- Arena: Town of Mount Royal Arena
- Dates: February 25–March 2
- Winner: British Columbia
- Curling club: North Shore WC, North Vancouver
- Skip: Lindsay Sparkes
- Third: Dawn Knowles
- Second: Robin Wilson
- Lead: Lorraine Bowles
- Finalist: Manitoba (Chris Pidzarko)

The 1979 Macdonald Lassies Championship, the Canadian women's curling championship was held February 25 to March 2, 1979, at the Town of Mount Royal Arena in Mount Royal, Quebec. This was the last women's championship to be sponsored by Macdonald Tobacco and also the first event to feature a playoff.

Team British Columbia, who was skipped by Lindsay Sparkes won the event by defeating Manitoba 7–4 in the final after also finishing first in the round robin with an 8–2 record. This was BC's fourth championship overall and the second skipped by Sparkes, who also won in 1976. The Sparkes rink also went on to represent Canada in the inaugural Women's World Curling Championship, the 1979 Royal Bank of Scotland World Women's Curling Championship which they lost in the semifinal to eventual champion Switzerland.

== Event Summary ==
Through the first eight draws of the tournament, British Columbia was sitting at the top of the standings with an unbeaten record of 7–0, Nova Scotia and Quebec were tied for second with 6–2 records, while Newfoundland sat at 5–2, Alberta right behind at 5–3, and Manitoba (who started 1–3) and Saskatchewan both sitting at 4–3.

Draw 9 saw the playoff situation become clearer. Manitoba handed BC their first loss of the tournament 5–4, Quebec defeated Newfoundland 5–4, both Saskatchewan and Nova Scotia cruised to victory in their matchups while Alberta drew a bye. With two draws remaining, there was a good chance that at least one tiebreaker would be required but also a chance that tiebreakers wouldn't be needed to determine playoff spots.

Unknown at the time, the penultimate draw (Draw 10) early on Friday would be the beginning of a long day for several teams. Newfoundland would defeat BC 9–8 while Saskatchewan and Manitoba were both victorious as well. Alberta defeated Nova Scotia 9–1 in only six ends and Quebec drew a bye. Alberta's victory guaranteed that a tiebreaker playoff would be required as Nova Scotia drew a bye in the final draw. Heading into the final draw of round robin play, two very important matchups were on the horizon with the BC/Quebec matchup winner getting a direct bye into the final and the loser joining Nova Scotia and the Alberta/Saskatchewan winner in the tiebreakers with the loser of Alberta/Saskatchewan being eliminated. Newfoundland and Manitoba would both need to win in order to be in the tiebreaker playoff as well.

The final draw would see BC would clinch a spot in the final with a 6–3 win over Quebec while Saskatchewan eliminated Alberta from contention with a back-and-forth 11–9 victory. With both Newfoundland and Manitoba cruising to victories, this meant that Manitoba, Newfoundland, Nova Scotia, Quebec, and Saskatchewan were all tied for second place with 7–3 records requiring three tiebreaker games to determine two semifinal berths.

The tiebreaker matchups would feature Newfoundland vs. Quebec and Nova Scotia vs. Manitoba. The Nova Scotia/Manitoba winner received one semifinal spot while Saskatchewan would play the Newfoundland/Quebec winner for the other semifinal berth.

In the first round of tiebreakers Thursday evening, Newfoundland jumped out to a 3-0 lead after two ends in their game against Quebec and never looked back for a commanding 9–3 victory in nine ends while Manitoba scored three in the fifth to take command in an 8–5 victory over Nova Scotia to advance to the semifinal. The second round of tiebreakers late Thursday night saw a high-scoring affair between Saskatchewan and Newfoundland. Despite playing their fourth game of the day and trailing 10-8 after eight ends, Newfoundland scored three in the ninth to take the lead and stole one in the tenth for good measure and advance to the semifinal with a 12–10 victory.

The four games the previous day would end up taking a toll on Newfoundland in their semifinal matchup with Manitoba as Manitoba controlled the game early and dominated the tired Newfoundland rink 10–2 and meet BC in the final for their eighth win in a row after starting 1–3. The final would see BC dominate Manitoba for a 7–4 victory in nine ends as BC led 5–1 after the halfway point and 7–2 after seven ends. The victory gave Sparkes her second title and a spot in the inaugural women's world curling championships.

== Teams ==
The teams are listed as follows:

Alberta	British Columbia	Manitoba	New Brunswick
Lethbridge CC, Lethbridge Skip: Myrna McQuarrie; Third: Barb Davis; Second: Gayle Pilling; Lead: Diane Smummach	North Shore WC, North Vancouver Skip: Lindsay Sparkes; Third: Dawn Knowles; Second: Robin Wilson; Lead: Lorraine Bowles	Stony Mountain CC, Stony Mountain Skip: Chris Pidzarko; Third: Rose Tanasichuk; Second: Iris Armstrong; Lead: Patti Vande	Bathurst CC, Bathurst Skip: Anne Orser; Third: Pat Maher; Second: Elvera Kennah; Lead: Shirley Gammon
Newfoundland	Nova Scotia	Ontario	Prince Edward Island
Carol CC, Labrador City Skip: Sue Anne Bartlett; Third: Patricia Dwyer; Second: Joyce Narduzzi; Lead: Mavis Pike	CFB Halifax CC, Halifax Skip: Penny LaRocque; Third: Brenda Shutt; Second: Colleen Jones; Lead: Charmaine Murray; Alternate: Barbara Jones	Boulevard CC, Toronto Skip: Pat Reid; Third: Sandi Norton; Second: Carmel O'Malley; Lead: Lynda Stoyka	Crapaud Community CC, Crapaud Skip: Elayne Thompson; Third: Ruth Cutcliffe; Second: Louise Thompson; Lead: Julie Robinson
Quebec	Saskatchewan	Northwest Territories/Yukon
Baie-D'Urfé CC, Baie-D'Urfé Skip: Lorraine Bowes; Third: Faye Gardiner; Second: Joan Brown; Lead: Barbara Donnelly	Granite CC, Saskatoon Skip: Barb Despins; Third: Lynne Fuller; Second: Elaine Farkas; Lead: Diane Lynn	Hay River CC, Hay River Skip: Margaret Whitlock; Third: Marion Clifford; Second: Delaine Kardash; Lead: Amber Schroter

== Map of teams ==
Provincial Winners

== Round Robin standings ==
Final Round Robin standings

Key
Teams to Playoffs
Teams to Tiebreakers

Team	Skip	W	L	PF	PA
British Columbia	Lindsay Sparkes	8	2	80	43
Nova Scotia	Penny LaRocque	7	3	71	58
Saskatchewan	Barb Despins	7	3	77	63
Manitoba	Chris Pidzarko	7	3	73	53
Quebec	Lorraine Bowes	7	3	77	58
Newfoundland	Sue Anne Bartlett	7	3	81	56
Alberta	Myrna McQuarrie	6	4	79	63
Ontario	Pat Reid	3	7	49	65
New Brunswick	Anne Orser	1	9	45	89
Northwest Territories/Yukon	Margaret Whitlock	1	9	44	86
Prince Edward Island	Elayne Thompson	1	9	48	90

== Round Robin results ==
=== Draw 1 ===
Sunday, February 25

Team	1	2	3	4	5	6	7	8	9	10	Final
Northwest Territories/Yukon (Whitlock)	0	3	0	0	1	1	1	0	1	0	7
Quebec (Bowes)	2	0	1	2	0	0	0	2	0	1	8

Team	1	2	3	4	5	6	7	8	9	10	Final
Ontario (Reid)	2	0	1	0	2	0	0	0	0	X	5
Manitoba (Pidzarko)	0	4	0	2	0	1	1	0	1	X	9

Team	1	2	3	4	5	6	7	8	9	10	Final
Alberta (McQuarrie)	4	0	1	1	0	1	0	1	0	X	8
New Brunswick (Orser)	0	0	0	0	1	0	1	0	2	X	4

Team	1	2	3	4	5	6	7	8	9	10	Final
Saskatchewan (Despins)	0	1	0	0	0	0	2	0	0	X	3
Nova Scotia (LaRocque)	3	0	1	1	1	1	0	1	1	X	9

Team	1	2	3	4	5	6	7	8	9	10	Final
Newfoundland (Bartlett)	1	0	2	0	2	1	0	2	0	1	9
Prince Edward Island (Thompson)	0	3	0	1	0	0	1	0	3	0	8

=== Draw 2 ===
Sunday, February 25

Team	1	2	3	4	5	6	7	8	9	10	Final
New Brunswick (Orser)	0	1	0	1	0	0	2	0	1	X	5
Nova Scotia (LaRocque)	3	0	3	0	1	1	0	2	0	X	10

Team	1	2	3	4	5	6	7	8	9	10	Final
Newfoundland (Bartlett)	1	3	0	0	1	1	1	3	X	X	10
Ontario (Reid)	0	0	2	0	0	0	0	0	X	X	2

Team	1	2	3	4	5	6	7	8	9	10	Final
Quebec (Bowes)	3	4	1	0	2	0	2	X	X	X	12
Prince Edward Island (Thompson)	0	0	0	1	0	2	0	X	X	X	3

Team	1	2	3	4	5	6	7	8	9	10	Final
Northwest Territories/Yukon (Whitlock)	0	1	0	0	0	0	0	X	X	X	1
British Columbia (Sparkes)	2	0	2	1	2	3	1	X	X	X	11

Team	1	2	3	4	5	6	7	8	9	10	Final
Alberta (McQuarrie)	2	0	0	0	3	0	1	1	0	2	9
Manitoba (Pidzarko)	0	0	0	4	0	2	0	0	2	0	8

=== Draw 3 ===
Monday, February 26

Team	1	2	3	4	5	6	7	8	9	10	Final
Prince Edward Island (Thompson)	0	0	0	0	0	0	1	0	X	X	1
British Columbia (Sparkes)	0	1	2	1	1	1	0	2	X	X	8

Team	1	2	3	4	5	6	7	8	9	10	Final
Alberta (McQuarrie)	0	0	2	0	0	0	2	1	0	X	5
Newfoundland (Bartlett)	2	1	0	1	2	1	0	0	0	X	7

Team	1	2	3	4	5	6	7	8	9	10	Final
Nova Scotia (LaRocque)	0	1	0	3	0	1	1	1	0	X	7
Manitoba (Pidzarko)	0	0	2	0	1	0	0	0	1	X	4

Team	1	2	3	4	5	6	7	8	9	10	Final
New Brunswick (Orser)	0	0	0	1	0	1	X	X	X	X	2
Saskatchewan (Despins)	1	2	4	0	4	0	X	X	X	X	11

Team	1	2	3	4	5	6	7	8	9	10	Final
Quebec (Bowes)	0	1	0	0	4	3	0	1	X	X	9
Ontario (Reid)	0	0	1	1	0	0	1	0	X	X	3

=== Draw 4 ===
Monday, February 26

Team	1	2	3	4	5	6	7	8	9	10	Final
Manitoba (Pidzarko)	2	0	0	0	1	0	1	1	0	0	5
Saskatchewan (Despins)	0	2	1	1	0	1	0	0	1	1	7

Team	1	2	3	4	5	6	7	8	9	10	Final
Quebec (Bowes)	0	0	1	0	0	2	0	2	2	0	7
Alberta (McQuarrie)	3	0	0	0	1	0	1	0	0	1	6

Team	1	2	3	4	5	6	7	8	9	10	Final
British Columbia (Sparkes)	0	0	1	0	0	0	3	2	0	0	6
Ontario (Reid)	2	0	0	0	1	1	0	0	0	1	5

Team	1	2	3	4	5	6	7	8	9	10	Final
Prince Edward Island (Thompson)	0	0	1	0	0	0	0	2	1	0	4
Northwest Territories/Yukon (Whitlock)	0	2	0	2	1	1	1	0	0	1	8

Team	1	2	3	4	5	6	7	8	9	10	Final
Nova Scotia (LaRocque)	0	0	0	0	0	2	1	0	1	X	4
Newfoundland (Bartlett)	0	1	1	1	4	0	0	1	0	X	8

=== Draw 5 ===
Tuesday, February 27

Team	1	2	3	4	5	6	7	8	9	10	Final
Ontario (Reid)	0	0	0	2	2	1	3	0	2	X	10
Northwest Territories/Yukon (Whitlock)	1	0	1	0	0	0	0	1	0	X	3

Team	1	2	3	4	5	6	7	8	9	10	Final
Nova Scotia (LaRocque)	1	0	1	2	1	0	3	0	0	X	8
Quebec (Bowes)	0	2	0	0	0	1	0	1	2	X	6

Team	1	2	3	4	5	6	7	8	9	10	Final
Saskatchewan (Despins)	1	0	3	1	0	2	0	1	0	1	9
Newfoundland (Bartlett)	0	2	0	0	2	0	2	0	1	0	7

Team	1	2	3	4	5	6	7	8	9	10	Final
Manitoba (Pidzarko)	0	0	2	0	2	0	2	0	2	X	8
New Brunswick (Orser)	1	0	0	1	0	2	0	1	0	X	5

Team	1	2	3	4	5	6	7	8	9	10	Final
British Columbia (Sparkes)	0	0	0	4	1	0	3	0	2	1	11
Alberta (McQuarrie)	0	2	1	0	0	3	0	3	0	0	9

=== Draw 6 ===
Tuesday, February 27

Team	1	2	3	4	5	6	7	8	9	10	Final
Newfoundland (Bartlett)	4	0	0	3	0	2	1	1	X	X	11
New Brunswick (Orser)	0	3	0	0	1	0	0	0	X	X	4

Team	1	2	3	4	5	6	7	8	9	10	Final
British Columbia (Sparkes)	1	0	2	0	1	2	1	0	2	X	9
Nova Scotia (LaRocque)	0	1	0	1	0	0	0	2	0	X	4

Team	1	2	3	4	5	6	7	8	9	10	Final
Northwest Territories/Yukon (Whitlock)	1	0	2	1	0	1	0	0	0	X	5
Alberta (McQuarrie)	0	3	0	0	1	0	2	3	2	X	11

Team	1	2	3	4	5	6	7	8	9	10	Final
Ontario (Reid)	0	2	0	2	1	1	1	0	2	X	9
Prince Edward Island (Thompson)	0	0	1	0	0	0	0	3	0	X	4

Team	1	2	3	4	5	6	7	8	9	10	Final
Saskatchewan (Despins)	0	2	0	1	0	1	1	0	X	X	5
Quebec (Bowes)	2	0	5	0	4	0	0	2	X	X	13

=== Draw 7 ===
Tuesday, February 27

Team	1	2	3	4	5	6	7	8	9	10	Final
Alberta (McQuarrie)	2	0	0	0	3	1	0	0	0	3	9
Prince Edward Island (Thompson)	0	1	1	2	0	0	0	2	0	0	6

Team	1	2	3	4	5	6	7	8	9	10	Final
Saskatchewan (Despins)	0	1	0	0	1	0	1	0	1	X	4
British Columbia (Sparkes)	0	0	0	3	0	2	0	1	0	X	6

Team	1	2	3	4	5	6	7	8	9	10	Final
New Brunswick (Orser)	0	2	0	0	1	0	2	2	0	0	7
Quebec (Bowes)	1	0	1	2	0	1	0	0	4	1	10

Team	1	2	3	4	5	6	7	8	9	10	Final
Newfoundland (Bartlett)	0	0	1	0	0	3	0	2	0	X	6
Manitoba (Pidzarko)	0	5	0	1	1	0	1	0	1	X	9

Team	1	2	3	4	5	6	7	8	9	10	Final
Northwest Territories/Yukon (Whitlock)	1	0	0	0	0	2	0	3	0	X	6
Nova Scotia (LaRocque)	0	0	1	3	1	0	3	0	4	X	12

=== Draw 8 ===
Wednesday, February 28

Team	1	2	3	4	5	6	7	8	9	10	Final
Quebec (Bowes)	1	0	2	0	0	0	0	1	0	X	4
Manitoba (Pidzarko)	0	1	0	0	2	2	1	0	3	X	9

Team	1	2	3	4	5	6	7	8	9	10	Final
Northwest Territories/Yukon (Whitlock)	0	0	2	0	0	1	0	1	X	X	4
Saskatchewan (Despins)	1	2	0	0	3	0	3	0	X	X	9

Team	1	2	3	4	5	6	7	8	9	10	Final
Alberta (McQuarrie)	0	0	0	2	0	1	0	0	0	1	4
Ontario (Reid)	1	0	0	0	0	0	1	0	1	0	3

Team	1	2	3	4	5	6	7	8	9	10	Final
New Brunswick (Orser)	0	0	1	0	1	0	0	0	X	X	2
British Columbia (Sparkes)	2	1	0	3	0	2	1	2	X	X	11

Team	1	2	3	4	5	6	7	8	9	10	Final
Prince Edward Island (Thompson)	0	0	0	3	2	0	0	0	0	0	5
Nova Scotia (LaRocque)	0	1	0	0	0	1	0	1	2	2	7

=== Draw 9 ===
Wednesday, February 28

Team	1	2	3	4	5	6	7	8	9	10	Final
Nova Scotia (LaRocque)	0	3	1	0	3	1	0	1	X	X	9
Ontario (Reid)	0	0	0	2	0	0	1	0	X	X	3

Team	1	2	3	4	5	6	7	8	9	10	Final
New Brunswick (Orser)	0	1	0	1	0	1	1	0	2	X	6
Northwest Territories/Yukon (Whitlock)	1	0	1	0	1	0	0	1	0	X	4

Team	1	2	3	4	5	6	7	8	9	10	Final
Manitoba (Pidzarko)	0	0	0	1	0	2	1	0	0	1	5
British Columbia (Sparkes)	1	0	0	0	2	0	0	1	0	0	4

Team	1	2	3	4	5	6	7	8	9	10	11	Final
Quebec (Bowes)	0	0	0	1	0	0	0	3	0	0	1	5
Newfoundland (Bartlett)	0	1	0	0	1	0	0	0	1	1	0	4

Team	1	2	3	4	5	6	7	8	9	10	Final
Prince Edward Island (Thompson)	0	0	1	0	0	1	1	1	0	X	4
Saskatchewan (Despins)	2	0	0	3	4	0	0	0	2	X	11

=== Draw 10 ===
Thursday, March 1

Team	1	2	3	4	5	6	7	8	9	10	Final
British Columbia (Sparkes)	0	1	0	0	3	2	0	1	1	0	8
Newfoundland (Bartlett)	3	0	0	4	0	0	1	0	0	1	9

Team	1	2	3	4	5	6	7	8	9	10	Final
Prince Edward Island (Thompson)	0	2	4	0	1	0	0	2	2	X	11
New Brunswick (Orser)	2	0	0	1	0	2	1	0	0	X	6

Team	1	2	3	4	5	6	7	8	9	10	Final
Ontario (Reid)	2	0	0	0	0	2	0	0	0	X	4
Saskatchewan (Despins)	0	0	1	1	1	0	1	2	1	X	7

Team	1	2	3	4	5	6	7	8	9	10	Final
Nova Scotia (LaRocque)	1	0	0	0	0	0	X	X	X	X	1
Alberta (McQuarrie)	0	2	1	2	3	1	X	X	X	X	9

Team	1	2	3	4	5	6	7	8	9	10	Final
Manitoba (Pidzarko)	0	1	0	1	1	0	0	2	0	0	5
Northwest Territories/Yukon (Whitlock)	1	0	1	0	0	0	0	0	1	1	4

=== Draw 11 ===
Thursday, March 1

Team	1	2	3	4	5	6	7	8	9	10	Final
Saskatchewan (Despins)	1	0	0	3	3	0	2	1	0	1	11
Alberta (McQuarrie)	0	2	3	0	0	3	0	0	1	0	9

Team	1	2	3	4	5	6	7	8	9	10	Final
Manitoba (Pidzarko)	3	1	0	6	0	1	X	X	X	X	11
Prince Edward Island (Thompson)	0	0	1	0	1	0	X	X	X	X	2

Team	1	2	3	4	5	6	7	8	9	10	Final
Newfoundland (Bartlett)	3	0	1	2	0	1	3	X	X	X	10
Northwest Territories/Yukon (Whitlock)	0	1	0	0	1	0	0	X	X	X	2

Team	1	2	3	4	5	6	7	8	9	10	Final
British Columbia (Sparkes)	0	0	3	1	0	1	0	0	1	X	6
Quebec (Bowes)	0	1	0	0	1	0	0	1	0	X	3

Team	1	2	3	4	5	6	7	8	9	10	Final
Ontario (Reid)	0	1	0	1	1	0	1	1	0	X	5
New Brunswick (Orser)	1	0	1	0	0	1	0	0	1	X	4

== Tiebreakers ==
Five teams were tied for second, therefore there were three tiebreakers. The two remaining teams advanced to the semifinal.

Winners to Semifinal
Saskatchewan	10
Newfoundland	12
Newfoundland	9
Quebec	3
Nova Scotia	5
Manitoba	8

=== Round 1 ===
Thursday, March 1, 6:30 pm

Team	1	2	3	4	5	6	7	8	9	10	Final
Newfoundland (Bartlett)	1	2	0	1	0	1	1	0	3	X	9
Quebec (Bowes)	0	0	1	0	1	0	0	1	0	X	3

Team	1	2	3	4	5	6	7	8	9	10	Final
Nova Scotia (LaRocque)	1	0	0	1	0	2	0	0	1	X	5
Manitoba (Pidzarko)	0	2	1	0	3	0	2	0	0	X	8

=== Round 2 ===
Thursday, March 1, 10:00 pm

Team	1	2	3	4	5	6	7	8	9	10	Final
Saskatchewan (Despins)	0	2	0	2	0	3	0	3	0	0	10
Newfoundland (Bartlett)	3	0	1	0	2	0	2	0	3	1	12

== Playoffs ==
Semifinal			Final
			1	British Columbia	7
2	Manitoba	10	2	Manitoba	4
3	Newfoundland	2

=== Semifinal ===
Friday, March 2, 9:00 am

Team	1	2	3	4	5	6	7	8	9	10	Final
Manitoba (Pidzarko)	1	0	2	2	0	2	1	2	X	X	10
Newfoundland (Bartlett)	0	1	0	0	1	0	0	0	X	X	2

=== Final ===
Friday, March 2, 2:00 pm

Team	1	2	3	4	5	6	7	8	9	10	Final
British Columbia (Sparkes)	0	2	0	1	2	0	2	0	0	X	7
Manitoba (Pidzarko)	1	0	0	0	0	1	0	1	1	X	4
