= Laurie Carney =

Canadian curler

- Curler ♀

Team
- Curling club: North Shore WC, North Vancouver, BC

Curling career
- Member Association: British Columbia
- Hearts: 3: (1984, 1985, 1986)
- World Championship: 1 (1985)
Medal record
Curling
Representing Canada
World Championships
Gold medal – first place	1985 Jönköping
Representing British Columbia
Scott Tournament of Hearts
Gold medal – first place	1985 Winnipeg
Silver medal – second place	1986 London
Bronze medal – third place	1984 Charlottetown

Laurie Carney is a Canadian former curler.

She is a 1985 World champion and 1985 Scott Tournament of Hearts champion.

== Awards ==
- British Columbia Sports Hall of Fame: 1990, with all Linda Moore 1985 team.
- North Shore Sports Hall of Fame: 2019, with all Linda Moore 1985 team.

== Teams ==
Season	Skip	Third	Second	Lead	Alternate	Events
1983–84	Lindsay Sparkes	Linda Moore	Debbie Orr	Laurie Carney		STOH 1984 (bronze)
1984–85	Linda Moore	Lindsay Sparkes	Debbie Jones	Laurie Carney		STOH 1985 (gold); WCC 1985 (gold)
1985–86	Linda Moore	Lindsay Sparkes	Debbie Jones	Laurie Carney	Rae Moir	STOH 1986 (silver)
