= Debbie Jones-Walker =

Canadian curler (born 1953)

- Curler
- Born: March 23, 1953 (age 73); Edmonton, Alberta, Canada

Team
- Curling club: North Shore WC (Vancouver); Fort Rouge CC (Winnipeg)

Curling career
- Member Association: Manitoba; British Columbia
- Hearts: 8: (1984, 1985, 1986, 1995, 1996, 1997, 1999, 2000)
- World Championship: 2 (1985, 1995)
- Olympic: 1 (1988) (demo)
Medal record
Curling
Representing Canada
World Championships
Gold medal – first place	1985 Jönköping
Silver medal – second place	1995 Brandon
Olympic Games (demonstration)
Gold medal – first place	1988 Calgary	Women's
Representing British Columbia
Scott Tournament of Hearts
Gold medal – first place	1985 Winnipeg
Silver medal – second place	1986 London
Bronze medal – third place	1984 Charlottetown
Canadian Olympic Curling Trials
Gold medal – first place	1987 Calgary
Representing Manitoba
Scott Tournament of Hearts
Gold medal – first place	1995 Calgary
Bronze medal – third place	1996 Thunder Bay
Bronze medal – third place	1999 Charlottetown
Bronze medal – third place	2000 Prince George

Deborah Jones-Walker (also known as Debbie Jones; born March 23, 1953 in Edmonton as Debbie Orr) is a Canadian former curler.

She is a 1985 World champion and two-time Scott Tournament of Hearts champion (1985, 1995).

She competed at the 1988 Winter Olympics when curling was a demonstration sport. The Canadian women's team won the gold medal, defeating Sweden in the final.

Jones-Walker was inducted into the Canadian Curling Hall of Fame in 1991.

She is an honorary member of the North Shore Winter Club and was inducted into the BC Sports Hall of Fame in 1990.

Originally from Winnipeg, she lived in British Columbia from 1978 to 1990.

== Teams ==
=== Women's ===
Season	Skip	Third	Second	Lead	Alternate	Coach	Events
1978–79	Marlene Neubauer	Debbie Orr	Maryanne Nowak	Carla Regier			
1980–81	Heather Haywood	Debbie Orr	Audrey Lowes	Sandy McCubbin			
1910–82	Heather Haywood	Debbie Orr	Audrey Lowes	Sandy McCubbin			
1982–83	Lindsay Sparkes	Linda Moore	Debbie Orr	Laurie Carney			
1983–84	Lindsay Sparkes	Linda Moore	Debbie Orr	Laurie Carney			STOH 1984 (bronze)
1984–85	Linda Moore	Lindsay Sparkes	Debbie Jones	Laurie Carney			STOH 1985 (gold); WCC 1985 (gold)
1985–86	Linda Moore	Lindsay Sparkes	Debbie Jones	Laurie Carney	Rae Moir		STOH 1986 (silver)
1987–88	Linda Moore	Lindsay Sparkes	Debbie Jones	Penny Ryan	Patti Vande (OG)		COCT 1987 (gold); OG 1988 (gold)
1994–95	Connie Laliberte	Cathy Overton	Cathy Gauthier	Janet Arnott	Debbie Jones-Walker	Tom Clasper	STOH 1995 (gold); WCC 1995 (silver)
1995–96	Connie Laliberte	Cathy Overton-Clapham	Cathy Gauthier	Janet Arnott	Debbie Jones-Walker		STOH 1996 (bronze)
1996–97	Janet Harvey	Debbie Jones-Walker	Carol Harvey	Alison Harvey	Karen Porritt		STOH 1997 (5th)
1998–99	Connie Laliberte	Cathy Overton-Clapham	Debbie Jones-Walker	Janet Arnott	Jill Staub		STOH 1999 (bronze)
1999–00	Connie Laliberte	Cathy Overton-Clapham	Debbie Jones-Walker	Janet Arnott	Jill Staub	Bob Moroz	STOH 2000 (bronze)
2012	Penny Shantz	Debbie Jones-Walker	Deborah Pulak	Shirley Wong			CSCC 2012 (10th)

=== Mixed ===
Season	Skip	Third	Second	Lead	Events
1976–77	Harold Tanasichuk	Rose Tanasichuk	Jim Kirkness	Debbie Orr	CMxCC 1977 (gold)
1979	Glen Pierce	Debbie Orr	Bryan Longmuir	Marlene Neubauer	
