= Lindsay Sparkes =

Canadian curler

Medal record

Women's curling

Representing Canada

World Championships
Gold medal – first place	1985 Jönköping	Women's
Bronze medal – third place	1979 Perth	Women's

Olympic Games (demonstration)
Gold medal – first place	1988 Calgary	Women's

Scott Tournament of Hearts
Gold medal – first place	1976 Winnipeg	Women's
Gold medal – first place	1979 Mount Royal	Women's
Gold medal – first place	1985 Winnipeg	Women's
Silver medal – second place	1986 London	Women's
Bronze medal – third place	1984 Charlottetown	Women's
Bronze medal – third place	1992 Halifax	Women's

Canadian Olympic Curling Trials
Gold medal – first place	1987 Calgary	

Lindsay E. Sparkes (born August 6, 1950 in North Vancouver, British Columbia as Lindsay Davie) is a Canadian curler. She is a three-time Canadian champion, world champion and Olympic demonstration champion.

In 1976, Sparkes and her team of Dawn Knowles, Robin Klassen, Lorraine Bowles won her first provincial and her first national championship. In 1979, the team returned to the national championship, and won again. This qualified them for the inaugural 1979 Royal Bank of Scotland World Women's Curling Championship. The team lost in the semi-final to Switzerland.

In 1984, Sparkes and her new team of Linda Moore, Debbie Orr and Laurie Carney won her third provincial title, and finished in 3rd place at that year's national championship (at that point, called the Tournament of Hearts.) The following season, Sparkes and Moore switched positions, and the team won another provincial and went on to claim the 1985 Scott Tournament of Hearts title, beating Newfoundland in the final. At the 1985 World Championships, the team won the gold medal, defeating Scotland in the final. The 1986 Scott Tournament of Hearts would mark the first event where the defending champion could return as Team Canada, and the team lost in the final to Ontario.

The team was chosen by the Canadian Olympic Committee to represent Canada at the 1988 Winter Olympics where curling was a demonstration sport. The team won the gold medal, defeating Sweden in the final.

Sparkes' final appearance at the Hearts was in 1997 as an alternate for the Kelley Owen (Law) rink.
