= 1981 Canadian Ladies Curling Association Championship =

Canadian women's curling championship

- Host city: St. John's, Newfoundland
- Arena: Memorial Stadium
- Dates: February 21–28
- Winner: Alberta
- Curling club: North Hill CC, Calgary
- Skip: Susan Seitz
- Third: Judy Erickson
- Second: Myrna McKay
- Lead: Betty McCracken
- Finalist: Newfoundland (Sue Anne Bartlett)

The 1981 Canadian Ladies Curling Association Championship (nicknamed "The Lassie") the Canadian women's curling championship was from February 21 to 28, 1981 at Memorial Stadium in St. John's, Newfoundland. It was the final year before Scott Paper began sponsoring the event.

Team Alberta, who was skipped by Susan Seitz won the event as they defeated the home province, Newfoundland in the final 7–3. This was the fourth overall championship for Alberta and the only national championship for Seitz.

The Seitz rank would go onto represent Canada in the 1981 Royal Bank of Scotland World Women's Curling Championship in Perth, Scotland where they finished runner-up losing to Sweden in the final.

== Teams ==
The teams are listed as follows:

Alberta	British Columbia	Manitoba	New Brunswick
North Hill CC, Calgary Skip: Susan Seitz; Third: Judy Erickson; Second: Myrna McKay; Lead: Betty McCracken	Comox Valley CC, Courtenay Skip: Barbara Parker; Third: Sharon Hastings; Second: Donna Cunliffe; Lead: Sheila Mellis	Fort Garry Business Girls CC, Winnipeg Skip: Joan Ingram; Third: Lorraine Bradawaski; Second: Lorraine Byrnes; Lead: Elaine James	Carleton CC, Saint John Skip: Barbara Anne Hutton; Third: Nancy Steele; Second: Jane Hutton; Lead: Lorraine Brewer
Newfoundland	Nova Scotia	Ontario	Prince Edward Island
Carol CC, Labrador City Skip: Sue Anne Bartlett; Third: Patricia Dwyer; Second: Joyce Narduzzi; Lead: Jo Ann Bepperling	Truro CC, Truro Skip: Judy Burgess; Third: Yvonne Bagnell; Second: Mary Bentley; Lead: Beth Smith	Sudbury CC, Sudbury Skip: Sheila Seltzer; Third: Brenda Buchanan; Second: Marcia Poulin; Lead: Beth Dykalski	Silver Fox CC, Summerside Skip: Beverly Millar; Third: Elizabeth Miles; Second: Norma Worth; Lead: Wanda McLean
Quebec	Saskatchewan	Northwest Territories/Yukon
Sigma CC, Val-d'Or Skip: Micheline Tremblay; Third: Nicole Belisle; Second: Margot Lepage; Lead: Carmen Gauthier	Wadena CC, Wadena Skip: Susan Altman; Third: Gloria Leach; Second: Delores Syrota; Lead: Joan Sweatman	Yellowknife CC, Yellowknife Skip: Donna Alexander; Third: Doris Sekulich; Second: Cecille Ward; Lead: Marilyn Paradis

== Map of teams ==
Provincial Winners

== Round Robin standings ==
Final Round Robin standings

Key
Teams to Playoffs

Team	Skip	W	L	PF	PA
Alberta	Susan Seitz	9	1		
Manitoba	Joan Ingram	8	2		
Newfoundland	Sue Anne Bartlett	7	3		
Ontario	Sheila Seltzer	6	4		
British Columbia	Barbara Parker	6	4		
Saskatchewan	Susan Altman	6	4		
Northwest Territories/Yukon	Donna Alexander	6	4		
New Brunswick	Barbara Anne Hutton	2	8		
Prince Edward Island	Beverly Millar	2	8		
Quebec	Micheline Tremblay	2	8		
Nova Scotia	Judy Burgess	1	9		

== Round Robin results ==
All times are listed in Newfoundland Standard Time (UTC-03:30).

=== Draw 1 ===
Saturday, February 21, 2:30 pm

Team	1	2	3	4	5	6	7	8	9	10	Final
Nova Scotia (Burgess)	1	0	1	1	0	0	0	2	0	X	5
Quebec (Tremblay)	0	1	0	0	1	1	1	0	6	X	10

Team	1	2	3	4	5	6	7	8	9	10	Final
Saskatchewan (Altman)	0	0	0	0	0	0	0	1	0	0	1
British Columbia (Parker)	0	2	0	1	0	2	0	0	2	1	8

Team	1	2	3	4	5	6	7	8	9	10	Final
New Brunswick (Hutton)	2	0	1	0	2	0	1	0	0	X	6
Alberta (Seitz)	0	1	0	1	0	1	0	3	1	X	7

Team	1	2	3	4	5	6	7	8	9	10	Final
Prince Edward Island (Millar)	0	0	0	0	1	0	X	X	X	X	1
Northwest Territories/Yukon (Alexander)	1	4	3	3	0	2	X	X	X	X	13

Team	1	2	3	4	5	6	7	8	9	10	Final
Newfoundland (Bartlett)	0	3	0	1	0	0	1	0	0	0	5
Manitoba (Ingram)	1	0	0	0	2	0	0	1	1	1	6

=== Draw 2 ===
Saturday, February 21, 7:30 pm

Team	1	2	3	4	5	6	7	8	9	10	Final
Alberta (Seitz)	1	0	2	0	3	0	2	1	1	X	10
Northwest Territories/Yukon (Alexander)	0	1	0	2	0	1	0	0	0	X	4

Team	1	2	3	4	5	6	7	8	9	10	Final
Newfoundland (Bartlett)	1	0	0	1	0	1	0	0	0	X	3
Saskatchewan (Altman)	0	0	2	0	0	0	1	0	2	X	5

Team	1	2	3	4	5	6	7	8	9	10	Final
Quebec (Tremblay)	0	0	1	1	3	0	0	1	0	2	8
Manitoba (Ingram)	0	1	0	0	0	2	0	0	3	0	6

Team	1	2	3	4	5	6	7	8	9	10	Final
Nova Scotia (Burgess)	1	0	1	0	1	0	1	0	0	X	4
Ontario (Seltzer)	0	1	0	4	0	2	0	3	1	X	11

Team	1	2	3	4	5	6	7	8	9	10	Final
New Brunswick (Hutton)	0	0	0	2	1	0	0	0	X	X	3
British Columbia (Parker)	2	3	3	0	0	0	1	2	X	X	11

=== Draw 3 ===
Sunday, February 22, 1:30 pm

Team	1	2	3	4	5	6	7	8	9	10	Final
Manitoba (Ingram)	0	2	0	3	0	0	1	0	1	X	7
Ontario (Seltzer)	0	0	1	0	0	1	0	1	0	X	3

Team	1	2	3	4	5	6	7	8	9	10	Final
New Brunswick (Hutton)	0	0	0	0	0	1	0	0	0	X	1
Newfoundland (Bartlett)	1	0	0	1	2	0	0	1	1	X	6

Team	1	2	3	4	5	6	7	8	9	10	Final
Northwest Territories/Yukon (Alexander)	0	0	0	0	0	1	0	1	0	X	2
British Columbia (Parker)	0	1	0	2	1	0	1	0	1	X	6

Team	1	2	3	4	5	6	7	8	9	10	Final
Alberta (Seitz)	0	0	1	2	0	3	1	0	0	0	7
Prince Edward Island (Millar)	1	0	0	0	1	0	0	0	0	1	3

Team	1	2	3	4	5	6	7	8	9	10	Final
Quebec (Tremblay)	0	0	1	0	1	0	0	1	0	X	3
Saskatchewan (Altman)	1	0	0	2	0	1	2	0	4	X	10

=== Draw 4 ===
Sunday, February 22, 7:30 pm

Team	1	2	3	4	5	6	7	8	9	10	Final
British Columbia (Parker)	1	0	0	1	0	2	0	1	0	2	7
Prince Edward Island (Millar)	0	1	1	0	2	0	0	0	2	0	6

Team	1	2	3	4	5	6	7	8	9	10	Final
Quebec (Tremblay)	1	2	0	0	0	3	0	0	0	X	6
New Brunswick (Hutton)	0	0	1	2	2	0	0	2	1	X	8

Team	1	2	3	4	5	6	7	8	9	10	Final
Ontario (Seltzer)	1	0	0	4	0	3	0	1	2	X	11
Saskatchewan (Altman)	0	1	0	0	2	0	1	0	0	X	4

Team	1	2	3	4	5	6	7	8	9	10	Final
Manitoba (Ingram)	2	0	2	2	1	0	1	1	3	X	12
Nova Scotia (Burgess)	0	2	0	0	0	1	0	0	0	X	3

Team	1	2	3	4	5	6	7	8	9	10	Final
Northwest Territories/Yukon (Alexander)	0	0	0	2	1	0	4	1	0	1	9
Newfoundland (Bartlett)	2	3	1	0	0	1	0	0	1	0	8

=== Draw 5 ===
Monday, February 23, 1:30 pm

Team	1	2	3	4	5	6	7	8	9	10	11	Final
Saskatchewan (Altman)	1	0	0	1	0	1	0	0	0	0	2	5
Nova Scotia (Burgess)	0	1	0	0	0	0	0	2	0	0	0	3

Team	1	2	3	4	5	6	7	8	9	10	Final
Northwest Territories/Yukon (Alexander)	0	0	2	0	0	3	2	1	X	X	8
Quebec (Tremblay)	1	1	0	2	1	0	0	0	X	X	5

Team	1	2	3	4	5	6	7	8	9	10	Final
Prince Edward Island (Millar)	0	0	0	0	2	0	0	0	X	X	2
Newfoundland (Bartlett)	1	2	3	3	0	1	0	1	X	X	11

Team	1	2	3	4	5	6	7	8	9	10	Final
British Columbia (Parker)	0	2	0	3	0	0	1	0	2	0	8
Alberta (Seitz)	1	0	1	0	2	1	0	2	0	2	9

Team	1	2	3	4	5	6	7	8	9	10	Final
Ontario (Seltzer)	0	1	0	2	0	0	0	4	0	X	7
New Brunswick (Hutton)	1	0	2	0	0	0	1	0	1	X	5

=== Draw 6 ===
Monday, February 23, 7:30 pm

Team	1	2	3	4	5	6	7	8	9	10	Final
Newfoundland (Bartlett)	0	1	0	4	0	1	0	2	0	1	9
Alberta (Seitz)	1	0	2	0	2	0	1	0	1	0	7

Team	1	2	3	4	5	6	7	8	9	10	Final
Ontario (Seltzer)	1	0	0	1	0	0	0	0	3	0	5
Northwest Territories/Yukon (Alexander)	0	1	1	0	0	0	1	2	0	1	6

Team	1	2	3	4	5	6	7	8	9	10	Final
Nova Scotia (Burgess)	0	0	2	1	0	1	0	2	0	1	7
New Brunswick (Hutton)	1	0	0	0	3	0	0	0	1	0	5

Team	1	2	3	4	5	6	7	8	9	10	Final
Saskatchewan (Altman)	1	0	1	0	0	1	0	0	0	0	3
Manitoba (Ingram)	0	1	0	1	0	0	0	1	0	1	4

Team	1	2	3	4	5	6	7	8	9	10	Final
Prince Edward Island (Millar)	4	0	0	1	0	4	1	0	X	X	10
Quebec (Tremblay)	0	1	2	0	1	0	0	2	X	X	6

=== Draw 7 ===
Tuesday, February 24, 1:30 pm

Team	1	2	3	4	5	6	7	8	9	10	Final
New Brunswick (Hutton)	1	0	0	1	0	0	2	0	1	X	5
Manitoba (Ingram)	0	1	1	0	1	1	0	2	0	X	6

Team	1	2	3	4	5	6	7	8	9	10	Final
Prince Edward Island (Millar)	0	0	0	0	1	0	X	X	X	X	1
Ontario (Seltzer)	2	1	1	2	0	3	X	X	X	X	9

Team	1	2	3	4	5	6	7	8	9	10	Final
Alberta (Seitz)	0	2	1	1	1	1	0	0	3	X	9
Quebec (Tremblay)	1	0	0	0	0	0	1	1	0	X	3

Team	1	2	3	4	5	6	7	8	9	10	Final
Newfoundland (Bartlett)	2	0	0	1	3	0	0	0	2	0	8
British Columbia (Parker)	0	2	1	0	0	1	1	1	0	1	7

Team	1	2	3	4	5	6	7	8	9	10	Final
Nova Scotia (Burgess)	2	0	0	1	0	0	1	0	0	0	4
Northwest Territories/Yukon (Alexander)	0	1	1	0	1	1	0	1	1	1	7

=== Draw 8 ===
Tuesday, February 24, 7:30 pm

Team	1	2	3	4	5	6	7	8	9	10	Final
Quebec (Tremblay)	1	0	2	2	0	0	3	0	1	X	9
British Columbia (Parker)	0	4	0	0	0	2	0	5	0	X	11

Team	1	2	3	4	5	6	7	8	9	10	Final
Nova Scotia (Burgess)	0	1	0	0	2	2	0	2	1	0	8
Prince Edward Island (Millar)	1	0	1	1	0	0	3	0	0	4	10

Team	1	2	3	4	5	6	7	8	9	10	Final
Manitoba (Ingram)	1	1	0	0	3	0	0	2	1	X	8
Northwest Territories/Yukon (Alexander)	0	0	1	1	0	2	1	0	0	X	5

Team	1	2	3	4	5	6	7	8	9	10	Final
New Brunswick (Hutton)	0	0	0	0	1	0	0	1	X	X	2
Saskatchewan (Altman)	0	1	1	1	0	3	3	0	X	X	9

Team	1	2	3	4	5	6	7	8	9	10	Final
Alberta (Seitz)	0	2	0	4	0	1	0	0	2	X	9
Ontario (Seltzer)	1	0	1	0	1	0	2	1	0	X	6

=== Draw 9 ===
Wednesday, February 25, 1:30 pm

Team	1	2	3	4	5	6	7	8	9	10	Final
Northwest Territories/Yukon (Alexander)	0	0	0	0	0	1	0	1	X	X	2
Saskatchewan (Altman)	1	2	0	2	1	0	2	0	X	X	8

Team	1	2	3	4	5	6	7	8	9	10	11	12	Final
Alberta (Seitz)	0	2	0	0	0	2	0	2	0	0	0	3	9
Nova Scotia (Burgess)	1	0	1	1	0	0	1	0	1	1	0	0	6

Team	1	2	3	4	5	6	7	8	9	10	Final
British Columbia (Parker)	0	1	1	0	0	1	0	0	1	0	4
Ontario (Seltzer)	0	0	0	1	0	0	1	2	0	3	7

Team	1	2	3	4	5	6	7	8	9	10	Final
Quebec (Tremblay)	0	0	1	0	1	0	0	X	X	X	2
Newfoundland (Bartlett)	2	1	0	4	0	3	2	X	X	X	11

Team	1	2	3	4	5	6	7	8	9	10	Final
Manitoba (Ingram)	1	2	1	2	1	0	4	X	X	X	11
Prince Edward Island (Millar)	0	0	0	0	0	1	0	X	X	X	1

=== Draw 10 ===
Wednesday, February 25, 7:30 pm

Team	1	2	3	4	5	6	7	8	9	10	Final
Ontario (Seltzer)	1	0	1	0	1	0	1	0	1	X	5
Newfoundland (Bartlett)	0	1	0	2	0	2	0	2	0	X	7

Team	1	2	3	4	5	6	7	8	9	10	Final
Manitoba (Ingram)	0	0	0	0	2	0	X	X	X	X	2
Alberta (Seitz)	1	2	1	1	0	4	X	X	X	X	9

Team	1	2	3	4	5	6	7	8	9	10	Final
Saskatchewan (Altman)	0	3	2	2	1	1	0	3	X	X	12
Prince Edward Island (Millar)	2	0	0	0	0	0	1	0	X	X	3

Team	1	2	3	4	5	6	7	8	9	10	Final
Northwest Territories/Yukon (Alexander)	0	0	1	1	0	2	0	2	0	X	6
New Brunswick (Hutton)	0	1	0	0	1	0	1	0	2	X	5

Team	1	2	3	4	5	6	7	8	9	10	Final
British Columbia (Parker)	2	1	0	1	0	1	0	1	1	X	7
Nova Scotia (Burgess)	0	0	1	0	2	0	1	0	0	X	4

=== Draw 11 ===
Thursday, February 26, 1:30 pm

Team	1	2	3	4	5	6	7	8	9	10	Final
Prince Edward Island (Millar)	0	0	1	0	0	1	0	X	X	X	2
New Brunswick (Hutton)	1	1	0	2	2	0	3	X	X	X	9

Team	1	2	3	4	5	6	7	8	9	10	Final
British Columbia (Parker)	1	1	0	3	0	3	0	2	0	0	10
Manitoba (Ingram)	0	0	4	0	1	0	2	0	3	1	11

Team	1	2	3	4	5	6	7	8	9	10	Final
Newfoundland (Bartlett)	2	0	0	0	0	2	2	1	0	X	7
Nova Scotia (Burgess)	0	1	0	1	0	0	0	0	2	X	4

Team	1	2	3	4	5	6	7	8	9	10	Final
Ontario (Seltzer)	3	0	3	0	1	3	X	X	X	X	10
Quebec (Tremblay)	0	2	0	1	0	0	X	X	X	X	3

Team	1	2	3	4	5	6	7	8	9	10	Final
Saskatchewan (Altman)	0	1	0	0	1	0	0	1	0	0	3
Alberta (Seitz)	0	0	2	0	0	0	5	0	0	1	8

== Playoffs ==
Semifinal			Final
			1	Alberta	7
2	Manitoba	5	3	Newfoundland	3
3	Newfoundland	6

=== Semifinal ===
Friday, February 27

Team	1	2	3	4	5	6	7	8	9	10	Final
Manitoba (Ingram)	0	0	0	0	1	0	2	2	0	0	5
Newfoundland (Bartlett)	1	0	0	1	0	2	0	0	1	1	6

=== Final ===
Saturday, February 28, 4:30 pm

Team	1	2	3	4	5	6	7	8	9	10	Final
Alberta (Seitz)	1	0	0	1	0	3	1	1	0	X	7
Newfoundland (Bartlett)	0	1	1	0	0	0	0	0	1	X	3
