= 1977 Macdonald Lassies Championship =

Canadian women's curling championship

- Host city: Halifax, Nova Scotia
- Arena: Saint Mary's Arena
- Dates: February 27–March 4
- Winner: Alberta
- Curling club: Lethbridge Ladies CC, Lethbridge
- Skip: Myrna McQuarrie
- Third: Rita Tarnava
- Second: Barbara Davis
- Lead: Jane Rampel

The 1977 Macdonald Lassies Championship, the Canadian women's curling championship was held February 27 to March 4, 1977, at the Saint Mary's Arena in Halifax, Nova Scotia. The event would see the first appearance for the Northwest Territories/Yukon region.

Team Alberta, who was skipped by Myrna McQuarrie won the event by finishing the round robin with a 9–1 record. This was Alberta's third championship and first since 1968.

== Teams ==
The teams are listed as follows:

Alberta	British Columbia	Manitoba	New Brunswick
Lethbridge Ladies CC, Lethbridge Skip: Myrna McQuarrie; Third: Rita Tarnava; Second: Barbara Davis; Lead: Jane Rempel	Richmond Ladies CC, Richmond Skip: Heather Kerr; Third: Bernice McCallan; Second: Shirley Snihur; Lead: Una Goodyear	Heather CC, Winnipeg Skip: Dorothy McKenzie; Third: Simone Rivard; Second: Una Irvine; Lead: Heather Helston	Capital Ladies CC, Fredericton Skip: Grace Donald; Third: Jane Mackine; Second: Nancy Syroid; Lead: Jackie Petzold
Newfoundland	Nova Scotia	Ontario	Prince Edward Island
St. John's CC, St. John's Skip: Karen Cole; Third: Jean Burden; Second: Shirley Burgess; Lead: Frances Burgess	Sydney CC, Sydney Skip: Jean Skinner; Third: Adine Boutilier; Second: Shirley Pace; Lead: Barbara McLeod	Humber Highland CC, Etobicoke Skip: Nini Mutch; Third: Wyn Hushagen; Second: Doris McKenzie; Lead: Rosina Lewicke	Belvedere G&WC, Charlottetown Skip: Phyllis Drysdale; Third: Esther Cox; Second: Shirley Veinot; Lead: Ethel Hovey
Quebec	Saskatchewan	Northwest Territories/Yukon
Montreal Caledonia CC, Westmount Skip: Carole Topp; Third: Nicole Labelle; Second: Suzanne Martin; Lead: Katherine Randall	Prince Albert G&CC, Prince Albert Skip: Crystal Brunas; Third: Bonnie Brandon; Second: Pamela Ochitawa; Lead: Sharon Kvinlaug	Yellowknife CC, Yellowknife Skip: Donna Alexander; Third: Doris Sekulich; Second: Cecille Ward; Lead: Dora Delmage

== Map of teams ==
Provincial Winners

== Round Robin Standings ==
Final round robin standings

Key
Lassies champion

Team	Skip	W	L	PF	PA
Alberta	Myrna McQuarrie	9	1		
Ontario	Nini Mutch	8	2		
British Columbia	Heather Kerr	7	3		
Manitoba	Dorothy McKenzie	7	3		
New Brunswick	Grace Donald	6	4		
Saskatchewan	Crystal Brunas	6	4		
Quebec	Carole Topp	4	6		
Northwest Territories/Yukon	Donna Alexander	4	6		
Newfoundland	Karen Cole	2	8		
Nova Scotia	Jean Skinner	2	8		
Prince Edward Island	Phyllis Drysdale	0	10		
