= Robin Wilson (curler) =

Canadian curler

- Curler ♀
- Other names: Robin Klassen

Team
- Curling club: North Shore WC, North Vancouver, British Columbia

Curling career
- Member Association: British Columbia
- Hearts: 2: (1976, 1979)
- World Championship: 1 (1979)
Medal record
Curling
Representing Canada
World Championships
Bronze medal – third place	1979 Perth
Representing British Columbia
Scott Tournament of Hearts
Gold medal – first place	1976 Winnipeg
Gold medal – first place	1979 Mount Royal

Robin Wilson (born c. 1951 as Robin Leigh Knowles) is a Canadian curler.

She is a 1979 World bronze medallist and two-time Scott Tournament of Hearts champion (1976, 1979).

In 2006, she was inducted into the Canadian Curling Hall of Fame together with all of the 1979 Lindsay Sparkes team. She retired from competitive curling in 1979.

In 1979, she and her sister and teammate Dawn Knowles began the push to have a sponsor for the Canadian Women's Curling Championship. She was credited for being the driving force behind Scott Paper Limited's decision in 1982 to come on board as the title sponsor of the Canadian Women's Curling Championship. Wilson has co-coordinated the Tournament of Hearts on behalf of Scott Paper for all of the company's years of sponsorship. For her contribution to the growth and development of the Hearts and women's curling in Canada, Wilson was also inducted into the Canadian Curling Hall of Fame in the "builder" category too, in addition to being in the "team" category.

Wilson also was the Executive Director for the Sandra Schmirler Foundation until March 2020.

She is married to former Canadian football player Al Wilson.

== Teams ==
Season	Skip	Third	Second	Lead	Events
1975–76	Lindsay Davie	Dawn Knowles	Robin Klassen	Lorraine Bowles	STOH 1976 (gold)
1978–79	Lindsay Sparkes	Dawn Knowles	Robin Wilson	Lorraine Bowles	STOH 1979 (gold); WCC 1979 (bronze)
