= Dawn Knowles =

Canadian curler

- Curler ♀
- Other names: Dawn Harris
- Born: April 25, 1953
- Died: March 29, 2006 (aged 52)

Team
- Curling club: North Shore WC, North Vancouver, British Columbia

Curling career
- Member Association: British Columbia
- Hearts: 2: (1976, 1979)
- World Championship: 1 (1979)
Medal record
Curling
Representing Canada
World Championships
Bronze medal – third place	1979 Perth
Representing British Columbia
Scott Tournament of Hearts
Gold medal – first place	1976 Winnipeg
Gold medal – first place	1979 Mount Royal

Dawn Kathryn Knowles (born April 25, 1953, died March 29, 2006; in marriage also known as Dawn Kathryn Harris) was a Canadian curler.

She was a 1979 World bronze medallist and two-time Scott Tournament of Hearts champion (1976, 1979).

In 2006, she was inducted into Canadian Curling Hall of Fame together with all of the 1979 Lindsay Sparkes team.

Knolwes was a teacher, and in the late 1970s, she used her knowledge and training to assist in the advancement of curling as one of the first members of the Curl Canada Coaching Program. The first-ever set of curling instructional films was developed in 1980 and Knowles was one of the models used in the six-part series. In 1982, the Canadian Curling Association introduced the National Team Leader Program and Knowles was the first person to assume the role, travelling to the women's world championship with Canada's representative, the team of Colleen Jones, Kay Smith, Monica Jones and Barbara Jones-Gordon.

In 1979, she and her sister and teammate Robin Wilson, who worked as a manager at Scott Paper company, began the push to have Scott paper sponsor the Canadian Women's Curling Championship.

== Teams ==
Season	Skip	Third	Second	Lead	Events
1975–76	Lindsay Davie	Dawn Knowles	Robin Klassen	Lorraine Bowles	STOH 1976 (gold)
1978–79	Lindsay Sparkes	Dawn Knowles	Robin Wilson	Lorraine Bowles	STOH 1979 (gold); WCC 1979 (bronze)
