= Susan Seitz =

Canadian curler

- Curler

Curling career
- Hearts: 2 (1981, 1985)
- World Championship: 1 (1981)
Medal record
Curling
Representing Canada
World Championships
Silver medal – second place	1981 Perth
Representing Alberta
Canadian Ladies Curling Association Championship
Gold medal – first place	1981 St. John's

Susan Seitz, née Shields (born c. 1950) is a Canadian curler from Calgary, Alberta. She is former Canadian champion and World championship silver medallist.

== Career ==
Seitz grew up in Medicine Hat, Alberta where she was a top junior curler. In 1968, she and her team of Delores Close, Patsy Erickson and Ellen Noble won the Alberta Junior Curling Championships. The event predated the women's Canadian Juniors.

Seitz won her first of two provincial championships in 1981, when she defeated Heather Wells of Lethbridge, 7-6. Her rink, which included Judy Erickson, Myrna McKay and Betty McCracken, would go on to represent Alberta at the 1981 Canadian Ladies Curling Association Championship. At the 1981 "Lassie", they would finish the round robin with a 9-1 record, in first place. They won their final match against Newfoundland's Sue Anne Bartlett in St. John's. The team would then go on to represent Canada at the 1981 Royal Bank of Scotland World Women's Curling Championship in Perth, Scotland. The team finished 8-1 after round robin play, in a tie with Sweden's Elisabeth Högström. The Swedish team would beat Seitz in the final 7-2 to claim gold. Seitz and her rink would have to settle for silver.

Seitz won her second provincial title in 1985 when she defeated Grande Prairie's Karen Gould 9-3. Her rink of Judy Lukowich, Erickson and McCracken represented Alberta at the 1985 Scott Tournament of Hearts. At the Hearts, they would finish the round robin with 7-3 record, good enough for a tiebreaker match against Newfoundland's Bartlett. Bartlett would this time beat Seitz's rink 8-2.

Later in her career, Seitz won an Alberta Seniors title in 2001 with teammates Heather Loat, Darlene Breckenridge and Saren McLean Her team would represent Alberta at the 2001 Canadian Senior Curling Championships in her home of Calgary. The team would go 6-5 in the round robin, missing the playoffs.
