= Lorraine Bowles =

Canadian curler

- Curler ♀
- Other names: Lorraine Ambrosio

Team
- Curling club: North Shore Winter Club, North Vancouver, BC

Curling career
- Member Association: British Columbia
- Hearts: 2: (1976, 1979)
- World Championship: 1 (1979)
Medal record
Curling
Representing Canada
World Championships
Bronze medal – third place	1979 Perth
Representing British Columbia
Macdonald Lassies
Gold medal – first place	1976 Winnipeg
Gold medal – first place	1979 Mount Royal

Lorraine Anne Bowles (born c. 1950) (in marriage also known as Lorraine Ambrosio) is a Canadian curler.

She is a 1979 World bronze medallist and two-time Canadian women's champion (1976, 1979).

In 2006, she was inducted into the Canadian Curling Hall of Fame together with all of the 1979 Lindsay Sparkes team.

== Teams ==
Season	Skip	Third	Second	Lead	Events
1975–76	Lindsay Davie	Dawn Knowles	Robin Klassen	Lorraine Bowles	STOH 1976 (gold)
1978–79	Lindsay Sparkes	Dawn Knowles	Robin Wilson	Lorraine Bowles	STOH 1979 (gold); WCC 1979 (bronze)
