= Harold Tanasichuk =

Canadian curler (1938–2021)

- Curler
- Born: March 19, 1938; Bethany, Manitoba, Canada
- Died: September 24, 2021 (aged 83)

Team
- Curling club: Civic Caledonian; Deer Lodge

Harold George "Happy Hal" Tanasichuk (March 19, 1938 – September 24, 2021) was a Canadian curler. He was a Canadian mixed champion in 1977.

Tanasichuk was born in Bethany, Manitoba to Anasthasia and Mike Tanasichuk, and grew up in Clanwilliam, Manitoba. Tanasichuk moved to Winnipeg in the 1960s, where he worked in construction, as a gas/pipe fitter, and then started A & H Petroleum Services Ltd. Following his retirement in 1989, he worked as the icemaker at the Deer Lodge Curling Club.

Tanasichuk played in 25 provincial championships, won three Manitoba mixed titles (1976, 1977, 1986), and a provincial seniors title in 1989. In 1976, he and his wife Rose and teammates Jim Kirkness and Marg Homenuik represented Manitoba at the Canadian Mixed Curling Championship, where they finished 4th with a 7–4 record. The following year, with new lead Debbie Orr, the team won the Canadian Mixed Curling Championship, after finishing with a 10–1 record. He also won the MCA Bonspiel grand aggregate once, in 1976, defeating Paul Devlin in the final. In 1986, Tanasichuk and teammates Barb, Jim and Darcy Kirkness represented Manitoba at that year's Canadian Mixed, where they finished tied in 6th, with a 6–6 record, including a tiebreaker loss to Quebec's Jean St. Pierre rink.

In 1989, Tanasichuk and teammates Barry Hallick, Jack Robertson and Ernie Anema represented Manitoba at the 1989 Canadian Senior Curling Championships. There, he led Manitoba to a third place round robin finish, with an 8–3 record. This put them in a tiebreaker against Alberta's Bill Clark rink, for the final playoff spot, which they lost, settling for fourth.

== Personal life ==
Tanasichuk was married to Rose Makowaychuk and later Marg Woods, and had three children. In addition to curling, he was an avid horseshoer, golfer and fisher. He was inducted into the Manitoba Curling Hall of Fame twice. He died in 2021 from cancer.
