= Myrna McKay =

Canadian curler (1949–2018)

- Curler ♀
- Born: January 12, 1949; Kerrobert, Saskatchewan, Canada
- Died: May 30, 2018 (aged 69); Crossfield, Alberta

Team
- Curling club: Calgary CC, Calgary, AB, North Hill CC, Calgary, AB

Curling career
- Member Association: Alberta
- Hearts: 1: (1981)
- World Championship: 1 (1981)
Medal record
Fast-pitch
Representing Alberta
Canada Summer Games
Silver medal – second place	1969 Halifax
Curling
Representing Canada
World Championships
Silver medal – second place	1981 Perth
Representing Alberta
Scott Tournament of Hearts
Gold medal – first place	1981 St. John's

Myrna Jean McKay (born January 12, 1949, in Kerrobert, Saskatchewan; died May 30, 2018, in Crossfield, Alberta) was a Canadian curler.

She was a 1981 World women's silver medallist and 1981 Scott Tournament of Hearts champion.

McKay grew up in Red Deer Lake and Calgary, and later moved to Crossfield. In addition to her success in curling, she won a silver medal in fast-pitch as part of team Alberta at the 1969 Canada Summer Games.

== Teams ==
Season	Skip	Third	Second	Lead	Events
1980–81	Susan Seitz	Judy Erickson	Myrna McKay	Betty McCracken	STOH 1981 (gold); WCC 1981 (silver)
