= 1985 Scott Tournament of Hearts =

Canadian women's curling championship

- Host city: Winnipeg, Manitoba
- Arena: Winnipeg Arena
- Dates: February 23–March 2
- Attendance: 18,203
- Winner: British Columbia
- Curling club: North Vancouver CC, North Vancouver
- Skip: Linda Moore
- Third: Lindsay Sparkes
- Second: Debbie Jones
- Lead: Laurie Carney
- Finalist: Newfoundland (Sue Anne Bartlett)

The 1985 Scott Tournament of Hearts, the Canadian women's curling championship, was held from February 23 to March 2, 1985 at the Winnipeg Arena in Winnipeg, Manitoba. The total attendance for the tournament was 18,203 people. This would be the first year in which the champion would automatically qualify to next year's tournament as Team Canada.

Team British Columbia, who was skipped by Linda Moore won the event by defeating Newfoundland 13–7 in the final in nine ends, marking the first time a final was conceded prior to ten ends being completed. This was BC's fifth title overall and the only title skipped by Moore.

Moore's rink dominated the tournament as they finished unbeaten with an 11–0 record, becoming the first team since the Emily Farnham's Saskatchewan rink did so in 1974 and the first team to do so in the Hearts era (since 1982). They were also the last team until 2013 to finish round robin play unbeaten and the last team until 2014 to not lose a single game in the tournament.

Moore's rink would go onto represent Canada in the 1985 World Women's Curling Championship in Jönköping, Sweden, which they also won.

The final would set records for the most points scored by one team in a final (13), the most combined points scored in a final (20), and the highest score in one end with hammer in a final (five by BC in the first end). The most points and combined points records remain finals records while the highest score with hammer was matched in the 2023 final.

== Teams ==
The teams were listed as follows:

Alberta	British Columbia	Manitoba	New Brunswick
North Hill CC, Calgary Skip: Susan Seitz; Third: Judy Lukowich; Second: Judy Erickson; Lead: Betty McCracken	North Vancouver CC, North Vancouver Skip: Linda Moore; Third: Lindsay Sparkes; Second: Debbie Jones; Lead: Laurie Carney	Portage la Prairie CC, Portage la Prairie Skip: Jacki Rintoul; Third: Merline Darbyshire; Second: Carolyn Darbyshire; Lead: Yvonne Beaudin	Thistle St. Andrews CC, Saint John Skip: Marlene Vaughan; Third: Judy Connor; Second: Gail Shields; Lead: Pauline Lynch
Newfoundland	Nova Scotia	Ontario	Prince Edward Island
Carol CC, Labrador City Skip: Sue Anne Bartlett; Third: Patricia Dwyer; Second: Margaret Knickle; Lead: Debbie Herbert	CFB Halifax CC, Halifax Skip: Virginia Jackson; Third: Marg Cutcliffe; Second: Joan Hutchinson; Lead: Sherry Jackson	Roseland CC, Windsor Skip: Pam Leavitt; Third: Susan Bell; Second: Bev Mainwaring; Lead: Deb Brousseau	Charlottetown CC, Charlottetown Skip: Kim Dolan; Third: Cathy Dillon; Second: Kathie Gallant; Lead: Karen MacDonald
Quebec	Saskatchewan	Yukon/Northwest Territories
Buckingham CC, Buckingham Skip: Nicole Filion; Third: Julie Graham; Second: June Lamarre; Lead: Mary Duranceau	Nutana CC, Saskatoon Skip: Sheila Rowan; Third: Jean MacLean; Second: Maureen Burkitt; Lead: Eileen Wilson	Whitehorse CC, Whitehorse Skip: Shelly Bildfell; Third: Betty McCrae; Second: Lou McCrae; Lead: Dale Twa

== Map of teams ==
Provincial Winners

== Round Robin Standings ==
Final Round Robin standings

Key
Teams to Playoffs
Teams to Tiebreaker

Team	Skip	W	L	PF	PA	EW	EL	BE	SE	S%
British Columbia	Linda Moore	10	0	72	47	44	40	6	13	71%
Nova Scotia	Virginia Jackson	7	3	69	53	48	36	6	16	64%
Newfoundland	Sue Anne Bartlett	7	3	73	60	46	44	6	18	65%
Alberta	Susan Seitz	7	3	75	57	46	41	5	18	64%
Yukon/Northwest Territories	Shelly Bildfell	6	4	72	65	46	40	1	19	61%
Manitoba	Jacki Rintoul	5	5	65	62	46	37	4	21	60%
Prince Edward Island	Kim Dolan	4	6	64	57	43	43	3	13	67%
Saskatchewan	Sheila Rowan	3	7	57	74	38	40	4	15	65%
Ontario	Pam Leavitt	3	7	59	66	37	44	4	12	62%
New Brunswick	Marlene Vaughn	2	8	46	84	32	41	9	8	59%
Quebec	Nicole Filion	1	9	49	76	32	50	3	9	53%

== Round Robin results ==
All draw times are listed in Central Standard Time (UTC-06:00).

=== Draw 1 ===
Saturday, February 23, 7:30 pm

Sheet A	1	2	3	4	5	6	7	8	9	10	Final
British Columbia (Moore)	0	0	1	0	0	0	1	3	0	X	5
New Brunswick (Vaughn) 🔨	0	0	0	1	0	0	0	0	0	X	1

Sheet B	1	2	3	4	5	6	7	8	9	10	Final
Manitoba (Rintoul)	0	0	1	0	0	0	0	0	X	X	1
Prince Edward Island (Dolan) 🔨	1	2	0	0	1	3	1	3	X	X	11

Sheet C	1	2	3	4	5	6	7	8	9	10	Final
Saskatchewan (Rowan) 🔨	1	0	0	0	2	1	1	0	1	X	6
Ontario (Leavitt)	0	0	0	1	0	0	0	2	0	X	3

Sheet D	1	2	3	4	5	6	7	8	9	10	Final
Quebec (Filion) 🔨	1	0	0	0	0	0	2	0	0	X	3
Nova Scotia (Jackson)	0	1	2	0	2	1	0	1	2	X	9

Sheet E	1	2	3	4	5	6	7	8	9	10	11	Final
Newfoundland (Bartlett)	0	0	0	0	1	0	1	2	1	0	2	7
Alberta (Seitz) 🔨	1	0	1	1	0	1	0	0	0	1	0	5

=== Draw 2 ===
Sunday, February 24, 2:00 pm

Sheet A	1	2	3	4	5	6	7	8	9	10	Final
Alberta (Seitz) 🔨	3	0	0	0	1	0	1	1	0	X	6
Nova Scotia (Jackson)	0	0	1	2	0	1	0	0	1	X	5

Sheet B	1	2	3	4	5	6	7	8	9	10	Final
New Brunswick (Vaughn) 🔨	0	0	0	2	2	0	4	0	0	1	9
Saskatchewan (Rowan)	1	0	3	0	0	4	0	0	2	0	10

Sheet C	1	2	3	4	5	6	7	8	9	10	Final
Prince Edward Island (Dolan) 🔨	1	1	0	0	2	0	0	1	1	X	6
Quebec (Filion)	0	0	1	0	0	1	1	0	0	X	3

Sheet D	1	2	3	4	5	6	7	8	9	10	Final
Ontario (Leavitt) 🔨	0	2	0	0	1	1	0	0	0	1	5
Newfoundland (Bartlett)	2	0	0	2	0	0	1	1	1	0	7

Sheet E	1	2	3	4	5	6	7	8	9	10	Final
Yukon/Northwest Territories (Bildfell)	1	0	2	0	0	0	0	1	1	X	5
Manitoba (Rintoul) 🔨	0	1	0	3	0	1	2	0	0	X	7

=== Draw 3 ===
Sunday, February 24, 7:30 pm

Sheet A	1	2	3	4	5	6	7	8	9	10	Final
Quebec (Filion)	0	0	2	1	0	0	0	1	0	X	4
Yukon/Northwest Territories (Bildfell) 🔨	1	2	0	0	1	1	1	0	1	X	7

Sheet B	1	2	3	4	5	6	7	8	9	10	Final
Nova Scotia (Jackson) 🔨	2	0	1	1	0	1	2	0	1	X	8
Ontario (Leavitt)	0	1	0	0	1	0	0	2	0	X	4

Sheet C	1	2	3	4	5	6	7	8	9	10	Final
Newfoundland (Bartlett) 🔨	1	0	0	2	0	0	2	2	0	1	8
New Brunswick (Vaughn)	0	1	1	0	2	1	0	0	1	0	6

Sheet D	1	2	3	4	5	6	7	8	9	10	Final
Prince Edward Island (Dolan)	0	1	0	0	1	0	2	0	1	2	7
Alberta (Seitz) 🔨	0	0	1	1	0	2	0	1	0	0	5

Sheet E	1	2	3	4	5	6	7	8	9	10	Final
Saskatchewan (Rowan)	1	0	0	0	1	1	0	1	1	0	5
British Columbia (Moore) 🔨	0	1	2	0	0	0	2	0	0	1	6

=== Draw 4 ===
Monday, February 25, 2:00 pm

Sheet A	1	2	3	4	5	6	7	8	9	10	Final
Ontario (Leavitt) 🔨	2	1	0	1	1	3	0	0	0	1	9
Prince Edward Island (Dolan)	0	0	1	0	0	0	2	2	2	0	7

Sheet B	1	2	3	4	5	6	7	8	9	10	11	Final
British Columbia (Moore)	0	3	0	0	0	2	0	0	1	1	1	8
Newfoundland (Bartlett) 🔨	2	0	1	3	0	0	1	0	0	0	0	7

Sheet C	1	2	3	4	5	6	7	8	9	10	Final
Yukon/Northwest Territories (Bildfell) 🔨	0	0	1	0	1	0	1	1	0	X	4
Alberta (Seitz)	2	1	0	1	0	1	0	0	2	X	7

Sheet D	1	2	3	4	5	6	7	8	9	10	Final
Manitoba (Rintoul)	0	2	1	1	0	1	1	0	1	X	7
Quebec (Filion) 🔨	2	0	0	0	1	0	0	1	0	X	4

Sheet E	1	2	3	4	5	6	7	8	9	10	Final
New Brunswick (Vaughn) 🔨	0	2	0	1	0	0	1	0	0	X	4
Nova Scotia (Jackson)	2	0	1	0	2	0	0	3	1	X	9

=== Draw 5 ===
Monday, February 25, 7:30 pm

Sheet A	1	2	3	4	5	6	7	8	9	10	Final
Newfoundland (Bartlett)	2	0	1	0	0	2	0	0	0	3	8
Saskatchewan (Rowan) 🔨	0	2	0	1	1	0	0	1	1	0	6

Sheet B	1	2	3	4	5	6	7	8	9	10	Final
Alberta (Seitz)	0	3	2	1	0	1	0	1	0	0	8
Manitoba (Rintoul) 🔨	2	0	0	0	2	0	0	0	1	2	7

Sheet C	1	2	3	4	5	6	7	8	9	10	Final
Nova Scotia (Jackson)	0	0	1	0	1	0	1	1	0	X	4
British Columbia (Moore) 🔨	1	2	0	2	0	1	0	0	1	X	7

Sheet D	1	2	3	4	5	6	7	8	9	10	Final
Prince Edward Island (Dolan) 🔨	0	2	0	1	0	1	0	0	1	0	5
New Brunswick (Vaughn)	1	0	0	0	1	0	1	1	0	2	6

Sheet E	1	2	3	4	5	6	7	8	9	10	Final
Ontario (Leavitt) 🔨	2	2	0	0	0	0	2	0	2	0	8
Yukon/Northwest Territories (Bildfell)	0	0	2	1	2	2	0	1	0	1	9

=== Draw 6 ===
Tuesday, February 26, 2:00 pm

Sheet A	1	2	3	4	5	6	7	8	9	10	Final
Quebec (Filion) 🔨	0	0	2	1	0	2	0	2	0	X	7
Alberta (Seitz)	2	2	0	0	2	0	2	0	2	X	10

Sheet B	1	2	3	4	5	6	7	8	9	10	Final
New Brunswick (Vaughn) 🔨	0	3	1	0	0	0	1	0	0	X	5
Yukon/Northwest Territories (Bildfell)	0	0	0	3	1	0	0	3	1	X	8

Sheet C	1	2	3	4	5	6	7	8	9	10	Final
Manitoba (Rintoul)	0	2	0	1	2	0	0	0	1	3	9
Ontario (Leavitt) 🔨	2	0	2	0	0	1	0	0	0	0	5

Sheet D	1	2	3	4	5	6	7	8	9	10	Final
Saskatchewan (Rowan)	0	1	0	1	0	0	0	1	2	0	5
Nova Scotia (Jackson) 🔨	1	0	2	0	0	0	1	0	0	2	6

Sheet E	1	2	3	4	5	6	7	8	9	10	Final
British Columbia (Moore)	0	1	0	1	0	3	0	1	0	0	6
Prince Edward Island (Dolan) 🔨	1	0	1	0	1	0	1	0	1	0	5

=== Draw 7 ===
Tuesday, February 26, 7:30 pm

Sheet A	1	2	3	4	5	6	7	8	9	10	Final
New Brunswick (Vaughn)	0	1	0	1	0	1	1	0	0	3	7
Manitoba (Rintoul) 🔨	0	0	2	0	2	0	0	1	0	0	5

Sheet B	1	2	3	4	5	6	7	8	9	10	Final
Quebec (Filion)	0	3	0	0	0	1	1	1	0	0	6
Ontario (Leavitt) 🔨	2	0	2	0	1	0	0	0	1	2	8

Sheet C	1	2	3	4	5	6	7	8	9	10	11	Final
Prince Edward Island (Dolan)	2	0	2	0	1	0	1	0	2	0	1	9
Saskatchewan (Rowan) 🔨	0	2	0	1	0	1	0	0	0	4	0	8

Sheet D	1	2	3	4	5	6	7	8	9	10	Final
Yukon/Northwest Territories (Bildfell)	0	1	0	0	1	0	3	0	0	X	5
British Columbia (Moore) 🔨	1	0	3	1	0	2	0	2	1	X	10

Sheet E	1	2	3	4	5	6	7	8	9	10	Final
Nova Scotia (Jackson)	1	1	0	0	2	1	0	1	0	1	7
Newfoundland (Bartlett) 🔨	0	0	0	2	0	0	1	0	3	0	6

=== Draw 8 ===
Wednesday, February 27, 2:00 pm

Sheet A	1	2	3	4	5	6	7	8	9	10	Final
Saskatchewan (Rowan) 🔨	0	0	0	1	0	X	X	X	X	X	1
Yukon/Northwest Territories (Bildfell)	2	1	3	0	5	X	X	X	X	X	11

Sheet B	1	2	3	4	5	6	7	8	9	10	Final
Newfoundland (Bartlett)	0	0	0	1	1	1	0	1	1	X	5
Prince Edward Island (Dolan) 🔨	2	0	0	0	0	0	1	0	0	X	3

Sheet C	1	2	3	4	5	6	7	8	9	10	Final
Manitoba (Rintoul) 🔨	2	1	0	1	0	1	0	1	1	X	7
British Columbia (Moore)	0	0	2	0	3	0	3	0	0	X	8

Sheet D	1	2	3	4	5	6	7	8	9	10	Final
Alberta (Seitz)	1	0	1	1	0	1	1	0	0	0	5
Ontario (Leavitt) 🔨	0	1	0	0	0	0	0	2	0	1	4

Sheet E	1	2	3	4	5	6	7	8	9	10	Final
Quebec (Filion) 🔨	0	3	0	2	3	3	X	X	X	X	11
New Brunswick (Vaughn)	0	0	1	0	0	0	X	X	X	X	1

=== Draw 9 ===
Wednesday, February 27, 7:30 pm

Sheet A	1	2	3	4	5	6	7	8	9	10	Final
Prince Edward Island (Dolan) 🔨	0	0	2	0	2	0	0	0	1	0	5
Nova Scotia (Jackson)	0	2	0	3	0	0	0	1	0	1	7

Sheet B	1	2	3	4	5	6	7	8	9	10	Final
British Columbia (Moore) 🔨	2	2	0	3	0	0	0	1	0	X	8
Quebec (Filion)	0	0	1	0	1	1	1	0	1	X	5

Sheet C	1	2	3	4	5	6	7	8	9	10	Final
New Brunswick (Vaughn) 🔨	1	0	1	0	2	0	0	1	0	X	5
Alberta (Seitz)	0	3	0	2	0	3	4	0	0	X	12

Sheet D	1	2	3	4	5	6	7	8	9	10	Final
Yukon/Northwest Territories (Bildfell) 🔨	0	0	0	0	1	0	4	0	2	X	7
Newfoundland (Barlett)	2	1	1	1	0	2	0	3	0	X	10

Sheet E	1	2	3	4	5	6	7	8	9	10	Final
Saskatchewan (Rowan) 🔨	0	0	0	0	0	1	0	0	X	X	1
Manitoba (Rintoul)	1	1	1	1	1	0	2	2	X	X	9

=== Draw 10 ===
Thursday, February 28, 2:00 pm

Sheet A	1	2	3	4	5	6	7	8	9	10	Final
Manitoba (Rintoul)	0	2	1	0	2	0	2	0	1	1	9
Newfoundland (Bartlett) 🔨	3	0	0	0	0	2	0	1	0	0	6

Sheet B	1	2	3	4	5	6	7	8	9	10	Final
Ontario (Leavitt)	0	3	2	1	2	3	X	X	X	X	11
New Brunswick (Vaughn) 🔨	2	0	0	0	0	0	X	X	X	X	2

Sheet C	1	2	3	4	5	6	7	8	9	10	Final
Nova Scotia (Jackson) 🔨	1	0	2	1	0	2	0	0	1	0	7
Yukon/Northwest Territories (Bildfell)	0	2	0	0	2	0	1	3	0	1	9

Sheet D	1	2	3	4	5	6	7	8	9	10	Final
Quebec (Filion)	0	0	0	0	0	2	0	X	X	X	2
Saskatchewan (Rowan) 🔨	2	1	2	4	1	0	1	X	X	X	11

Sheet E	1	2	3	4	5	6	7	8	9	10	Final
Alberta (Seitz) 🔨	1	1	0	0	0	1	0	1	0	2	6
British Columbia (Moore)	0	0	1	1	1	0	1	0	3	0	7

=== Draw 11 ===
Thursday, February 28, 7:30 pm

Sheet A	1	2	3	4	5	6	7	8	9	10	Final
British Columbia (Moore) 🔨	0	2	2	0	0	0	1	1	1	X	7
Ontario (Leavitt)	0	0	0	1	2	1	0	0	0	X	4

Sheet B	1	2	3	4	5	6	7	8	9	10	Final
Alberta (Seitz) 🔨	0	0	4	0	2	2	0	0	3	X	11
Saskatchewan (Rowan)	1	2	0	1	0	0	2	0	0	X	6

Sheet C	1	2	3	4	5	6	7	8	9	10	Final
Newfoundland (Bartlett) 🔨	1	1	2	1	0	1	0	3	0	X	9
Quebec (Filion)	0	0	0	0	1	0	1	0	2	X	4

Sheet D	1	2	3	4	5	6	7	8	9	10	Final
Nova Scotia (Jackson) 🔨	2	1	0	0	1	0	0	0	3	X	7
Manitoba (Rintoul)	0	0	1	1	0	1	0	1	0	X	4

Sheet E	1	2	3	4	5	6	7	8	9	10	Final
Yukon/Northwest Territories (Bildfell) 🔨	1	1	1	1	0	1	0	1	1	0	7
Prince Edward Island (Dolan)	0	0	0	0	3	0	2	0	0	1	6

== Tiebreaker ==
Friday, March 1, 2:00 pm

Sheet B	1	2	3	4	5	6	7	8	9	10	Final
Newfoundland (Bartlett) 🔨	0	0	0	2	1	3	0	2	X	X	8
Alberta (Seitz)	0	1	0	0	0	0	1	0	X	X	2

Player percentages
Newfoundland		Alberta	
Debbie Herbert	63%	Betty McCracken	75%
Margie Knickle	41%	Judy Erickson	59%
Patricia Dwyer	61%	Judy Lukowich	45%
Sue Anne Bartlett	80%	Susan Seitz	63%
Total	61%	Total	61%

== Playoffs ==
Semifinal			Final
			1	British Columbia	13
2	Nova Scotia	3	3	Newfoundland	7
3	Newfoundland	8

=== Semifinal ===
Friday, March 1, 7:30 pm

Sheet D	1	2	3	4	5	6	7	8	9	10	Final
Nova Scotia (Jackson)	0	0	0	0	0	1	1	1	0	X	3
Newfoundland (Bartlett) 🔨	0	2	1	1	3	0	0	0	1	X	8

Player percentages
Nova Scotia		Newfoundland	
Sherry Jackson	85%	Debbie Herbert	59%
Joan Hutchinson	88%	Margie Knickle	61%
Marg Cutcliffe	63%	Patricia Dwyer	68%
Virginia Jackson	46%	Sue Anne Bartlett	78%
Total	70%	Total	67%

=== Final ===
Saturday, March 2, 1:00 pm

Sheet C	1	2	3	4	5	6	7	8	9	10	Final
British Columbia (Moore) 🔨	5	2	1	0	1	0	2	0	2	X	13
Newfoundland (Bartlett)	0	0	0	2	0	2	0	3	0	X	7

Player percentages
British Columbia		Newfoundland	
Laurie Carney	72%	Debbie Herbert	82%
Debbie Jones	74%	Margie Knickle	69%
Lindsay Sparkes	60%	Patricia Dwyer	57%
Linda Moore	75%	Sue Anne Bartlett	60%
Total	75%	Total	67%

== Statistics ==
=== Top 5 player percentages ===
Final Round Robin Percentages

Key
All-Star Team

Leads	%
(Newfoundland and Labrador) Debbie Herbert	74
(Nova Scotia) Sherry Jackson	72
(British Columbia) Laurie Carney	70
(Ontario) Deb Brousseau	67
(Saskatchewan) Eileen Wilson	67

Seconds	%
(British Columbia) Debbie Jones	75
(Manitoba) Carolyn Darbyshire	68
(Saskatchewan) Maureen Burkitt	67
(Prince Edward Island) Kathie Gallant	67
(Ontario) Bev Mainwaring	66

Thirds	%
(British Columbia) Lindsay Sparkes	75
(Prince Edward Island) Cathy Dillon	74
(Saskatchewan) Jean MacLean	64
(Newfoundland and Labrador) Patricia Dwyer	63
(Alberta) Judy Lukowich	62
(New Brunswick) Judy Connor	62

Skips	%
(Alberta) Susan Seitz	66
(British Columbia) Linda Moore	63
(Saskatchewan) Sheila Rowan	63
(Prince Edward Island) Kim Dolan	63
(Nova Scotia) Virginia Jackson	62
(Newfoundland and Labrador) Sue Anne Bartlett	62

== Awards ==
The all-star team and sportsmanship award winners were as follows:

=== All-Star Team ===
Position	Name	Team
Skip	Susan Seitz	Alberta
Third	Lindsay Sparkes	British Columbia
Second	Debbie Jones	British Columbia
Lead	Debbie Herbert	Newfoundland

=== Lura McLuckie Award ===
The Scotties Tournament of Hearts Sportsmanship Award is presented to the curler who best embodies the spirit of curling at the Scotties Tournament of Hearts. The winner was selected in a vote by all players at the tournament.

Prior to 1998, the award was named after a notable individual in the curling community where the tournament was held that year. For this edition, the award was named after Lura McLuckie, a builder for women's curling as she was the president of both the Manitoba Ladies Curling Association and Canadian Ladies Curling Association and guided a Scottish women's tour along with helping launch the Canadian Junior Women's Curling Championship.

Name	Team	Position
Cathy Dillon	Prince Edward Island	Third
