= Margaret Knickle =

Canadian curler

Medal record

Representing Newfoundland

Scotties Tournament of Hearts
Silver medal – second place	1985 Winnipeg	

Representing Nova Scotia

Scotties Tournament of Hearts
Silver medal – second place	1980 Edmonton	

Margaret "Margie" Knickle is a Canadian curler from Nova Scotia. She represented Nova Scotia at the 1980 Canadian Ladies Curling Association Championship, finishing second. She represented Newfoundland and Labrador at the 1985 Scott Tournament of Hearts, finishing second.
