= Betty McCracken =

Canadian curler

- Curler ♀

Team
- Curling club: Calgary CC, Calgary, AB & North Hill CC, Calgary, AB

Curling career
- Member Association: Alberta
- Hearts: 2: (1981, 1985)
- World Championship: 1 (1981)
Medal record
Curling
Representing Canada
World Championships
Silver medal – second place	1981 Perth
Representing Alberta
Scott Tournament of Hearts
Gold medal – first place	1981 St. John's

Betty McCracken is a Canadian curler.

She is a 1981 World women's silver medallist and 1981 Scott Tournament of Hearts champion.

== Teams ==
Season	Skip	Third	Second	Lead	Events
1980–81	Susan Seitz	Judy Erickson	Myrna McKay	Betty McCracken	STOH 1981 (gold); WCC 1981 (silver)
1984–85	Susan Seitz	Judy Lukowich	Judy Erickson	Betty McCracken	STOH 1985 (4th)
