= 1976 Macdonald Lassies Championship =

Canadian women's curling championship

- Host city: Winnipeg, Manitoba
- Arena: Winnipeg Arena
- Dates: February 28–March 5
- Winner: British Columbia
- Curling club: North Shore WC, North Vancouver
- Skip: Lindsay Davie
- Third: Dawn Knowles
- Second: Robin Klassen
- Lead: Lorraine Bowles
- Finalist: Alberta (Gail Lee)

The 1976 Macdonald Lassies Championship, the Canadian women's curling championship was held February 28 to March 5, 1976, at Winnipeg Arena in Winnipeg, Manitoba. Despite a transit strike, attendance for the event exceeded 17,000.

Alberta and British Columbia both finished round robin play tied for first with 7–2 records, necessitating a tiebreaker playoff between the two teams. Team British Columbia, who was skipped by Lindsay Davie defeated Alberta 7–6 in the tiebreaker to capture the championship. This was BC's third title overall and their first since 1964. This would also be the first of three titles for Davie (later Sparkes) with the first two coming as a skip.

== Teams ==
The teams are listed as follows:

Alberta	British Columbia	Manitoba	New Brunswick	Newfoundland
Derrick CC, Edmonton Skip: Gail Lee; Third: Jackie Spencer; Second: Anne McGarvey; Lead: Liz Gemmell	North Shore WC, North Vancouver Skip: Lindsay Davie; Third: Dawn Knowles; Second: Robin Klassen; Lead: Lorraine Bowles	Souris Evening Ladies CC, Souris Skip: Joan Mogk; Third: Jean Moffatt; Second: Betty Devine; Lead: Karen Anderson	Bathurst Ladies CC, Bathurst Skip: Anne Orser; Third: Pat Maher; Second: Elvera Kennah; Lead: Ethel LePage	Carol CC, Labrador City Skip: Sue-Anne Bartlett; Third: Patricia Dwyer; Second: Frances Hiscock; Lead: Mavis Pike
Nova Scotia	Ontario	Prince Edward Island	Quebec	Saskatchewan
Dartmouth Ladies CC, Dartmouth Skip: Gwen Osborne; Third: Liz Young; Second: Nancy Margeson; Lead: Barbara McKenzie	Recreation Association CC, Ottawa Skip: Dawn Ventura; Third: Cathy Craig; Second: Lorie Mackie; Lead: Rhea Pilon	Charlottetown CC, Charlottetown Skip: Diane Blanchard; Third: Barbara McCurdy; Second: Deborah Richard; Lead: Sharon MacEwen	Glenmore CC, Dollard-des-Ormeaux Skip: Joan Gregory; Third: Mary Beveridge; Second: Barbara Brown; Lead: Janice Loney	Weyburn Ladies CC, Weyburn Skip: Delores Miller; Third: Gaby Kot; Second: Margaret Woodard; Lead: Jean Lowenberger

== Map of teams ==
Provincial Winners

== Round robin standings ==
Final round robin standings

Key
Teams to Tiebreaker

Province	Skip	W	L	PF	PA
Alberta	Gail Lee	7	2	72	53
British Columbia	Lindsay Davie	7	2	73	56
Ontario	Dawn Ventura	6	3	82	62
Saskatchewan	Delores Miller	6	3	66	70
Quebec	Joan Gregory	5	4	75	64
Manitoba	Joan Mogk	4	5	74	62
Newfoundland	Sue Anne Bartlett	4	5	68	62
Nova Scotia	Gwen Osborne	4	5	50	72
New Brunswick	Anne Orser	1	8	47	75
Prince Edward Island	Diane Blanchard	1	8	49	80

== Round robin results ==
=== Draw 1 ===
Team	1	2	3	4	5	6	7	8	9	10	11	Final
British Columbia (Davie)	0	0	0	0	4	0	0	0	3	0	1	8
Ontario (Ventura)	0	1	1	1	0	1	0	1	0	2	0	7

Team	1	2	3	4	5	6	7	8	9	10	Final
Manitoba (Mogk)	3	1	3	2	0	4	X	X	X	X	13
Nova Scotia (Osborne)	0	0	0	0	1	0	X	X	X	X	1

Team	1	2	3	4	5	6	7	8	9	10	Final
New Brunswick (Orser)	1	0	1	0	1	1	0	0	2	0	6
Prince Edward Island (Blanchard)	0	1	0	1	0	0	1	1	0	1	5

Team	1	2	3	4	5	6	7	8	9	10	Final
Alberta (Lee)	2	0	1	0	0	1	0	1	1	X	6
Saskatchewan (Miller)	0	2	0	5	1	0	2	0	0	X	10

Team	1	2	3	4	5	6	7	8	9	10	Final
Quebec (Gregory)	1	1	2	2	0	0	2	0	2	X	10
Newfoundland (Bartlett)	0	0	0	0	1	2	0	1	0	X	4

=== Draw 2 ===
Team	1	2	3	4	5	6	7	8	9	10	Final
Prince Edward Island (Blanchard)	1	0	0	0	0	0	0	X	X	X	1
Newfoundland (Bartlett)	0	2	3	2	3	3	2	X	X	X	15

Team	1	2	3	4	5	6	7	8	9	10	Final
Ontario (Ventura)	0	3	1	0	0	3	1	0	3	X	11
Nova Scotia (Osborne)	2	0	0	1	1	0	0	1	0	X	5

Team	1	2	3	4	5	6	7	8	9	10	Final
New Brunswick (Orser)	0	0	0	0	3	0	2	1	0	X	6
Quebec (Gregory)	2	3	1	1	0	2	0	0	2	X	11

Team	1	2	3	4	5	6	7	8	9	10	Final
Saskatchewan (Miller)	0	2	0	1	0	2	0	2	1	0	8
British Columbia (Davie)	0	0	1	0	4	0	3	0	0	5	13

Team	1	2	3	4	5	6	7	8	9	10	Final
Manitoba (Mogk)	0	0	0	1	0	2	0	1	0	1	5
Alberta (Lee)	1	0	1	0	1	0	2	0	2	0	7

=== Draw 3 ===
Team	1	2	3	4	5	6	7	8	9	10	Final
Saskatchewan (Miller)	0	0	1	1	0	1	2	1	1	0	7
New Brunswick (Orser)	3	1	0	0	1	0	0	0	0	1	6

Team	1	2	3	4	5	6	7	8	9	10	Final
Nova Scotia (Osborne)	0	0	3	1	0	0	0	3	0	4	11
Prince Edward Island (Blanchard)	1	2	0	0	3	1	1	0	2	0	10

Team	1	2	3	4	5	6	7	8	9	10	Final
Newfoundland (Bartlett)	0	0	1	0	2	1	0	0	0	0	4
British Columbia (Davie)	0	0	0	1	0	0	1	1	2	0	5

Team	1	2	3	4	5	6	7	8	9	10	Final
Ontario (Ventura)	1	1	0	1	0	2	1	0	1	0	7
Alberta (Lee)	0	0	3	0	2	0	0	3	0	1	9

Team	1	2	3	4	5	6	7	8	9	10	Final
Quebec (Gregory)	1	2	1	0	3	0	1	0	0	1	9
Manitoba (Mogk)	0	0	0	2	0	1	0	3	1	0	7

=== Draw 4 ===
Team	1	2	3	4	5	6	7	8	9	10	Final
Manitoba (Mogk)	2	0	0	0	0	1	1	0	0	X	4
Newfoundland (Bartlett)	0	1	2	1	2	0	0	3	3	X	12

Team	1	2	3	4	5	6	7	8	9	10	11	Final
Alberta (Lee)	0	0	1	0	2	0	0	0	3	0	1	7
British Columbia (Davie)	1	1	0	1	0	1	1	0	0	1	0	6

Team	1	2	3	4	5	6	7	8	9	10	Final
New Brunswick (Orser)	0	0	1	0	0	1	0	2	0	X	4
Nova Scotia (Osborne)	3	1	0	2	0	0	2	0	1	X	9

Team	1	2	3	4	5	6	7	8	9	10	Final
Prince Edward Island (Blanchard)	1	0	1	0	3	0	0	0	1	2	8
Quebec (Gregory)	0	1	0	1	0	1	1	1	0	0	5

Team	1	2	3	4	5	6	7	8	9	10	Final
Saskatchewan (Miller)	0	1	0	0	1	0	0	0	X	X	2
Ontario (Ventura)	2	0	5	1	0	1	2	2	X	X	13

=== Draw 5 ===
Team	1	2	3	4	5	6	7	8	9	10	Final
Nova Scotia (Osborne)	0	0	1	0	1	0	1	2	0	X	5
British Columbia (Davie)	0	0	0	0	0	0	0	0	1	X	1

Team	1	2	3	4	5	6	7	8	9	10	11	Final
Manitoba (Mogk)	0	0	1	2	0	0	1	0	2	1	0	7
Saskatchewan (Miller)	0	2	0	0	1	1	0	3	0	0	1	8

Team	1	2	3	4	5	6	7	8	9	10	Final
Quebec (Gregory)	1	1	0	3	0	0	1	0	0	X	6
Ontario (Ventura)	0	0	3	0	1	0	0	4	2	X	10

Team	1	2	3	4	5	6	7	8	9	10	Final
New Brunswick (Orser)	0	2	0	0	0	1	1	0	0	X	4
Newfoundland (Bartlett)	1	0	1	1	2	0	0	2	1	X	8

Team	1	2	3	4	5	6	7	8	9	10	Final
Alberta (Lee)	2	0	0	0	2	2	1	0	1	X	8
Prince Edward Island (Blanchard)	0	1	1	1	0	0	0	1	0	X	4

=== Draw 6 ===
Team	1	2	3	4	5	6	7	8	9	10	Final
Quebec (Gregory)	0	2	0	2	0	1	1	1	1	X	8
Alberta (Lee)	1	0	1	0	2	0	0	0	0	X	4

Team	1	2	3	4	5	6	7	8	9	10	Final
Ontario (Ventura)	3	0	3	2	0	0	3	1	0	X	12
Newfoundland (Bartlett)	0	1	0	0	4	2	0	0	2	X	9

Team	1	2	3	4	5	6	7	8	9	10	Final
Nova Scotia (Osborne)	0	0	0	0	0	1	0	1	X	X	2
Saskatchewan (Miller)	1	0	2	4	1	0	2	0	X	X	10

Team	1	2	3	4	5	6	7	8	9	10	Final
British Columbia (Davie)	1	1	2	1	0	0	2	0	1	X	8
Prince Edward Island (Blanchard)	0	0	0	0	1	1	0	2	0	X	4

Team	1	2	3	4	5	6	7	8	9	10	Final
Manitoba (Mogk)	0	0	0	4	0	2	3	0	2	X	11
New Brunswick (Orser)	1	1	1	0	1	0	0	1	0	X	5

=== Draw 7 ===
Team	1	2	3	4	5	6	7	8	9	10	Final
Prince Edward Island (Blanchard)	0	3	1	0	0	2	0	0	1	0	7
Saskatchewan (Miller)	1	0	0	4	0	0	0	2	0	1	8

Team	1	2	3	4	5	6	7	8	9	10	Final
British Columbia (Davie)	1	0	1	3	0	0	2	0	1	X	8
New Brunswick (Orser)	0	1	0	0	2	1	0	1	0	X	5

Team	1	2	3	4	5	6	7	8	9	10	Final
Alberta (Lee)	1	3	0	0	1	2	3	0	2	X	12
Newfoundland (Bartlett)	0	0	2	1	0	0	0	1	0	X	4

Team	1	2	3	4	5	6	7	8	9	10	Final
Manitoba (Mogk)	0	1	2	0	2	1	0	0	0	4	10
Ontario (Ventura)	1	0	0	1	0	0	1	2	1	0	6

Team	1	2	3	4	5	6	7	8	9	10	Final
Nova Scotia (Osborne)	1	0	1	0	2	1	0	0	4	X	9
Quebec (Gregory)	0	1	0	2	0	0	1	1	0	X	5

=== Draw 8 ===
Team	1	2	3	4	5	6	7	8	9	10	Final
New Brunswick (Orser)	0	1	1	0	2	0	1	0	1	0	6
Ontario (Ventura)	3	0	0	1	0	2	0	1	0	1	8

Team	1	2	3	4	5	6	7	8	9	10	Final
Prince Edward Island (Blanchard)	0	0	0	1	2	0	0	0	X	X	3
Manitoba (Mogk)	2	1	0	0	0	1	4	3	X	X	11

Team	1	2	3	4	5	6	7	8	9	10	Final
British Columbia (Davie)	0	2	0	1	0	3	2	0	3	2	13
Quebec (Gregory)	1	0	1	0	5	0	0	3	0	0	10

Team	1	2	3	4	5	6	7	8	9	10	Final
Alberta (Lee)	0	1	2	1	0	3	0	2	2	X	11
Nova Scotia (Osborne)	2	0	0	0	1	0	1	0	0	X	4

Team	1	2	3	4	5	6	7	8	9	10	Final
Newfoundland (Bartlett)	0	0	0	3	0	1	0	1	0	X	5
Saskatchewan (Miller)	2	1	2	0	1	0	3	0	1	X	10

=== Draw 9 ===
Team	1	2	3	4	5	6	7	8	9	10	Final
British Columbia (Davie)	2	0	0	1	1	2	0	2	3	X	11
Manitoba (Mogk)	0	2	3	0	0	0	1	0	0	X	6

Team	1	2	3	4	5	6	7	8	9	10	Final
Newfoundland (Bartlett)	0	0	1	0	0	2	1	2	1	X	7
Nova Scotia (Osborne)	1	1	0	1	1	0	0	0	0	X	4

Team	1	2	3	4	5	6	7	8	9	10	Final
Ontario (Ventura)	1	0	0	2	0	1	1	1	1	1	8
Prince Edward Island (Blanchard)	0	1	2	0	4	0	0	0	0	0	7

Team	1	2	3	4	5	6	7	8	9	10	Final
Quebec (Gregory)	1	1	3	3	0	0	3	X	X	X	11
Saskatchewan (Miller)	0	0	0	0	1	2	0	X	X	X	3

Team	1	2	3	4	5	6	7	8	9	10	Final
New Brunswick (Orser)	1	1	0	1	0	1	0	1	0	X	5
Alberta (Lee)	0	0	3	0	1	0	4	0	0	X	8

== Tiebreaker ==
Team	1	2	3	4	5	6	7	8	9	10	Final
British Columbia (Davie)	2	1	1	0	1	0	1	1	0	0	7
Alberta (Lee)	0	0	0	1	0	2	0	0	1	2	6
