= Myrna McQuarrie =

Canadian curler

Medal record

Curling

Macdonald Lassies Championship
Gold medal – first place	1977 Halifax	

Myrna McQuarrie (c. 1941 – 2018) was a Canadian curler. McQuarrie and her Lethbridge Curling Club rink of Rita Tarnava, Barbara Davis and Jane Rempel won the 1977 Macdonald Lassies Championship, Canada's national women's curling championship.

The 1977 McQuarrie rink went undefeated in their provincial playdowns, and continued their undefeated record into the provincial championship, which they won over 1966 and 1968 national champion Gail Lee. The team represented Alberta at the Canadian national championship, finishing with a 9-1 record to claim the title.

McQuarrie, Davis and new teammates Gayle Pilling and Diane Smummach won another provincial title in 1979. Representing Alberta at the 1979 Macdonald Lassies Championship, McQaurrie led her rink to a 6-4 record, missing the newly added playoffs.

McQuarrie's 1977 team was inducted into the Lethbridge Sports Hall of Fame in 1985.

Myrna was married to Jim McQuarrie, a fellow curler, who won the 1979 Alberta Mixed Championship.
