= Scotties Tournament of Hearts =

Canadian women's curling championship

Scotties Tournament of Hearts Le Tournoi des Cœurs Scotties
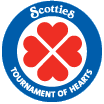
- Established: 1961; 65 years ago
- 2026 host city: Mississauga, Ontario
- 2026 arena: Paramount Fine Foods Centre
- 2026 champion: Canada (Kerri Einarson)

Current edition
- 2026 Scotties Tournament of Hearts

The Scotties Tournament of Hearts (French: Le Tournoi des Cœurs Scotties; commonly referred to as the Scotties) is the annual Canadian women's curling championship, sanctioned by Curling Canada. The winner goes on to represent Canada at the women's world curling championships. Since 1985, the winner also gets to return to the following year's tournament as "Team Canada". It is formally known as the "Canadian Women's Curling Championship".

Since 1982, the tournament has been sponsored by Kruger Products, which was formerly known as Scott Paper Limited when it was a Canadian subsidiary of Scott Paper Company, therefore, the tournament was formerly known as the Scott Tournament of Hearts. When Kimberly-Clark merged with Scott, the Canadian arm was sold to the Quebec-based Kruger Inc. – while Kruger was granted a licence to use several Scott brands in Canada until June 2007, it was given a long-term licence to the Scotties brand because Kimberly-Clark already owned Kleenex. As such, the tournament was officially renamed the Scotties Tournament of Hearts in 2007.

Until 2018, the format was a round robin of 12 teams. Starting with the 2015 Scotties Tournament of Hearts there have been more than twelve eligible teams; therefore a pre-qualification tournament was held to trim the field to twelve. In 2021, a new 18-team format was introduced, in which all 14 member associations of Curling Canada field a team in a main draw of two pools, alongside the defending champions, and the three highest-ranked teams on the Canadian Team Ranking System standings that did not win their provincial championships. The teams are separated into two pools of nine, each playing a round-robin within their pool, with the top three teams in each pool advancing to a second round to determine the final four teams.

At the end of the second round, playoffs occur to determine the championship winner. The system used is known as the Page playoff system.

== History ==
=== Pre-history ===
1913 marked a significant point in women's curling when both the Manitoba Bonspiel and the Ontario Curling Association began holding women's curling events. Other provinces would later add provincial women's championships, but it wasn't until the 1950s that a higher level of women's curling began to occur. At this time there was a Western Canada Women's Curling Championship (sponsored by the T. Eaton Company) but no tournament existed for the eastern provinces. By 1959, Eaton's pulled their sponsorship, giving the organizers of the Western championships an initiative to have a national championship.

In 1960, the Canadian Ladies' Curling Association was created with Dominion Stores Ltd. seeking to sponsor a national championship. That year, an eastern championship occurred so that the winner could play the winner of the western championship in an invitational event. In this event, Ruth Smith and her team from Lacolle, Quebec faced off against Joyce McKee's team from Saskatchewan (consisting of Sylvia Fedoruk, Donna Belding and Muriel Coben) with McKee winning the best-of-three series two games to none. The games between the two teams were played in Oshawa, Ontario.

The following year a tournament was organized with the same format as the Brier and was held in Ottawa. McKee won again, with a new front end of Barbara MacNevin and Rosa McFee.

=== Early history ===
In 1967, Dominion Stores were unable to reach a compromise with the organizers of the tournament, and their sponsorship fell. The Canadian Ladies' Curling Association ran the tournament by themselves with no main sponsor.

Sylvia Fedoruk, after assuming the presidency of the Canadian Ladies' Curling Association found a title sponsor in the Macdonald Tobacco Company, the same sponsor as the Brier. Their sponsorship began in 1972 with the tournament being called the "Macdonald Lassie" championship, after the company's trademark.

In 1979, under increasing pressure from the anti-tobacco policies of the Canadian Government, the Macdonald Tobacco Company pulled their sponsorship from both the Brier and the Women's championship. The Canadian Ladies' Curling Association ran the tournament without a main sponsor again for the next couple of years. 1979 also marked the first year of the Women's World Curling Championship, where the national champion would play. Also, the 1979 event was the first tournament to feature a playoff. Before then, the championship team was the one with the best round robin record.

=== Tournament of Hearts ===
Robin Wilson, a member of the 1979 championship team, and a former employee of Scott Paper led an effort to get the company to sponsor the championships. It was successful, and in 1982 the first Scott Tournament of Hearts was held.

The Scott Tournament of Hearts would last 25 years, and saw the likes of many great teams. The first Tournament of Hearts was won by Colleen Jones and her Nova Scotia team. It would take her 17 years to win another, but she would cap it off with another four championships for a grand total of six championships. In 2018, Colleen Jones' feat of six championships was equaled by Manitoba's Jennifer Jones. Other great curlers at the Hearts have been Kerri Einarson and Connie Laliberte of Manitoba, Heather Houston, Marilyn Bodogh and Rachel Homan of Ontario, Vera Pezer and Sandra Schmirler of Saskatchewan, Cathy Borst, Shannon Kleibrink, Heather Nedohin and Chelsea Carey of Alberta and Lindsay Sparkes and Kelly Scott of British Columbia.

The new sponsorship made the tournament popular when it began to be televised. Today, TSN covers the entire tournament. CBC had covered the semi-finals and the finals up until the 2007–08 season. In 2013, Sportsnet and Citytv began to offer coverage of the finals of the provincial playdowns in Manitoba, Ontario, and Alberta as well.

As a Tournament of Hearts tradition, the members of the winning team receive gold rings in the four-heart design of the Tournament of Hearts logo, set with a .25-carat diamond. The runners-up receive the same rings, with rubies instead of diamonds, and the third-place team receives gold rings set with emeralds.

Starting with the 2024 tournament, the first all-star team was entitled the Robin Wilson First All-Star Team.

In 2025, Scotties ceased their sponsorship of the provincial playdowns and stopped awarding jewellery to participants, but continued to award jewellery for teams that reach the podium. At the same time, Red Rose Tea began its status as a "prestige sponsor" of the event.

== Past champions ==
=== Diamond D Championship ===
Tournament	Winning Locale	Winning Team	Host
1960 (invitational)	Saskatchewan	Joyce McKee, Sylvia Fedoruk, Donna Belding, Muriel Coben	Oshawa, Ontario
1961	Saskatchewan	Joyce McKee, Sylvia Fedoruk, Barbara MacNevin, Rosa McFee	Ottawa, Ontario
1962	British Columbia	Ina Hansen, Ada Callas, Isabel Leith, May Shaw	Regina, Saskatchewan
1963	New Brunswick	Mabel DeWare, Harriet Stratton, Forbis Stevenson, Marjorie Fraser	Saint John, New Brunswick
1964	British Columbia	Ina Hansen, Ada Callas, Isabel Leith, May Shaw	Edmonton, Alberta
1965	Manitoba	Peggy Casselman, Val Taylor, Pat MacDonald, Pat Scott	Halifax, Nova Scotia
1966	Alberta	Gail Lee, Hazel Jamison, Sharon Harrington, June Coyle	North Vancouver, British Columbia
1967	Manitoba	Betty Duguid, Joan Ingram, Laurie Bradawaski, Dot Rose	Mount Royal, Quebec

=== Canadian Ladies Curling Association Championship ===
Tournament	Winning Locale	Winning Team	Host
1968	Alberta	Hazel Jamison, Gail Lee, Jackie Spencer, June Coyle	St. James, Manitoba
1969	Saskatchewan	Joyce McKee, Vera Pezer, Lenore Morrison, Jennifer Falk	Fort William, Ontario
1970	Saskatchewan	Dorenda Schoenhals, Cheryl Stirton, Linda Burnham, Joan Andersen	Calgary, Alberta
1971	Saskatchewan	Vera Pezer, Sheila Rowan, Joyce McKee, Lenore Morrison	St. John's, Newfoundland

=== Macdonald Lassies Championship ===
Tournament	Winning Locale	Winning Team	Host
1972	Saskatchewan	Vera Pezer, Sheila Rowan, Joyce McKee, Lenore Morrison	Saskatoon, Saskatchewan
1973	Saskatchewan	Vera Pezer, Sheila Rowan, Joyce McKee, Lenore Morrison	Charlottetown, Prince Edward Island
1974	Saskatchewan	Emily Farnham, Linda Saunders, Pat McBeath, Donna Collins	Victoria, British Columbia
1975	Quebec	Lee Tobin, Marilyn McNeil, Michelle Garneau, Laurie Ross	Moncton, New Brunswick
1976	British Columbia	Lindsay Davie, Dawn Knowles, Robin Klassen, Lorraine Bowles	Winnipeg, Manitoba
1977	Alberta	Myrna McQuarrie, Rita Tarnava, Barb Davis, Jane Rempel	Halifax, Nova Scotia
1978	Manitoba	Cathy Pidzarko, Chris Pidzarko, Iris Armstrong, Patti Vanderkerckhove	Sault Ste. Marie, Ontario

Tournament	Winning Locale	Winning Team	Finalist Locale	Finalist Team	Host
1979	British Columbia	Lindsay Sparkes, Dawn Knowles, Robin Wilson, Lorraine Bowles	Manitoba	Chris Pidzarko, Rose Tanasichuk, Iris Armstrong, Patti Vande	Mount Royal, Quebec

=== Canadian Ladies Curling Association Championship ===
Tournament	Winning Locale	Winning Team	Finalist Locale	Finalist Team	Host
1980	Saskatchewan	Marj Mitchell, Nancy Kerr, Shirley McKendry, Wendy Leach	Nova Scotia	Colleen Jones, Sally Jane Saunders, Margaret Knickle, Barbara Jones	Edmonton, Alberta
1981	Alberta	Susan Seitz, Judy Erickson, Myrna McKay, Betty McCracken	Newfoundland	Sue Anne Bartlett, Patricia Dwyer, Joyce Narduzzi, Jo Ann Bepperling	St. John's, Newfoundland

=== Scott Tournament of Hearts ===
Tournament	Winning Locale	Winning Team	Finalist Locale	Finalist Team	Host
1982	Nova Scotia	Colleen Jones, Kay Smith, Monica Jones, Barbara Jones-Gordon	Manitoba	Dot Rose, Lynne Andrews, Kim Crass, Shannon Burns	Regina, Saskatchewan
1983	Nova Scotia	Penny LaRocque, Sharon Horne, Cathy Caudle, Pam Sanford	Alberta	Cathy Shaw, Christine Jurgenson, Sandra Rippel, Penny Ryan	Prince George, British Columbia
1984	Manitoba	Connie Laliberte, Chris More, Corinne Peters, Janet Arnott	Nova Scotia	Colleen Jones, Wendy Currie, Monica Jones, Barbara Jones-Gordon	Charlottetown, Prince Edward Island
1985	British Columbia	Linda Moore, Lindsay Sparkes, Debbie Jones, Laurie Carney	Newfoundland	Sue Anne Bartlett, Patricia Dwyer, Margaret Knickle, Debra Herbert	Winnipeg, Manitoba
1986	Ontario	Marilyn Darte, Kathy McEdwards, Chris Jurgenson, Jan Augustyn	Canada	Linda Moore, Lindsay Sparkes, Debbie Jones, Laurie Carney	London, Ontario
1987	British Columbia	Pat Sanders, Louise Herlinveaux, Georgina Hawkes, Deb Massullo	Manitoba	Kathie Ellwood, Cathy Treloar, Laurie Ellwood, Sandra Asham	Lethbridge, Alberta
1988	Ontario	Heather Houston, Lorraine Lang, Diane Adams, Tracy Kennedy	Canada	Pat Sanders, Louise Herlinveaux, Georgina Hawkes, Deb Massullo	Fredericton, New Brunswick
1989	Canada	Heather Houston, Lorraine Lang, Diane Adams, Tracy Kennedy	Manitoba	Chris More, Karen Purdy, Lori Zeller, Kristin Kuruluk	Kelowna, British Columbia
1990	Ontario	Alison Goring, Kristin Turcotte, Andrea Lawes, Cheryl McPherson	Nova Scotia	Heather Rankin, Beth Rankin, Judith Power, Suzanne Green	Ottawa, Ontario
1991	British Columbia	Julie Sutton, Jodie Sutton, Melissa Soligo, Karri Willms	New Brunswick	Heidi Hanlon, Kathy Floyd, Sheri Stewart, Mary Harding	Saskatoon, Saskatchewan
1992	Manitoba	Connie Laliberte, Laurie Allen, Cathy Gauthier, Janet Arnott	Canada	Julie Sutton, Jodi Sutton, Melissa Soligo, Karri Willms	Halifax, Nova Scotia
1993	Saskatchewan	Sandra Peterson, Jan Betker, Joan McCusker, Marcia Gudereit	Manitoba	Maureen Bonar, Lois Fowler, Allyson Bell, Rhonda Fowler	Brandon, Manitoba
1994	Canada	Sandra Peterson, Jan Betker, Joan McCusker, Marcia Gudereit	Manitoba	Connie Laliberte, Karen Purdy, Cathy Gauthier, Janet Arnott	Waterloo, Ontario
1995	Manitoba	Connie Laliberte, Cathy Overton, Cathy Gauthier, Janet Arnott	Alberta	Cathy Borst, Maureen Brown, Deanne Shields, Kate Horne	Calgary, Alberta
1996	Ontario	Marilyn Bodogh, Kim Gellard, Corie Beveridge, Jane Hooper Perroud	Alberta	Cheryl Kullman, Karen Ruus, Barb Sherrington, Judy Pendergast	Thunder Bay, Ontario
1997	Saskatchewan	Sandra Schmirler, Jan Betker, Joan McCusker, Marcia Gudereit	Ontario	Alison Goring, Lori Eddy, Kim Moore, Mary Bowman	Vancouver, British Columbia
1998	Alberta	Cathy Borst, Heather Godberson, Brenda Bohmer, Kate Horne	Ontario	Anne Merklinger, Theresa Breen, Patti McKnight, Audrey Frey	Regina, Saskatchewan
1999	Nova Scotia	Colleen Jones, Kim Kelly, Mary-Anne Waye, Nancy Delahunt	Canada	Cathy Borst, Heather Godberson, Brenda Bohmer, Kate Horne	Charlottetown, Prince Edward Island
2000	British Columbia	Kelley Law, Julie Skinner, Georgina Wheatcroft, Diane Nelson	Ontario	Anne Merklinger, Theresa Breen, Patti McKnight, Audrey Frey	Prince George, British Columbia
2001	Nova Scotia	Colleen Jones, Kim Kelly, Mary-Anne Waye, Nancy Delahunt	Canada	Kelley Law, Julie Skinner, Georgina Wheatcroft, Diane Nelson	Sudbury, Ontario
2002	Canada	Colleen Jones, Kim Kelly, Mary-Anne Waye, Nancy Delahunt	Saskatchewan	Sherry Anderson, Kim Hodson, Sandra Mulroney, Donna Gignac	Brandon, Manitoba
2003	Canada	Colleen Jones, Kim Kelly, Mary-Anne Waye, Nancy Delahunt	Newfoundland and Labrador	Cathy Cunningham, Peg Goss, Kathy Kerr, Heather Martin	Kitchener, Ontario
2004	Canada	Colleen Jones, Kim Kelly, Mary-Anne Arsenault, Nancy Delahunt	Quebec	Marie-France Larouche, Karo Gagnon, Annie Lemay, Véronique Grégoire	Red Deer, Alberta
2005	Manitoba	Jennifer Jones, Cathy Overton-Clapham, Jill Officer, Cathy Gauthier	Ontario	Jenn Hanna, Pascale Letendre, Dawn Askin, Stephanie Hanna	St. John's, Newfoundland and Labrador
2006	British Columbia	Kelly Scott, Jeanna Schraeder, Sasha Carter, Renee Simons	Canada	Jennifer Jones, Cathy Overton-Clapham, Jill Officer, Georgina Wheatcroft	London, Ontario

=== Scotties Tournament of Hearts ===
Tournament	Gold		Silver		Bronze		Host
Tournament	Locale	Team	Locale	Team	Locale	Team	Host
2007	Canada	Kelly Scott; Jeanna Schraeder; Sasha Carter; Renee Simons	Saskatchewan	Jan Betker; Lana Vey; Nancy Inglis; Marcia Gudereit	Manitoba	Jennifer Jones; Cathy Overton-Clapham; Jill Officer; Janet Arnott	Lethbridge, Alberta
2008	Manitoba	Jennifer Jones; Cathy Overton-Clapham; Jill Officer; Dawn Askin	Alberta	Shannon Kleibrink; Amy Nixon; Bronwen Saunders; Chelsey Bell	Ontario	Sherry Middaugh; Kirsten Wall; Kim Moore; Andra Harmark	Regina, Saskatchewan
2009	Canada	Jennifer Jones; Cathy Overton-Clapham; Jill Officer; Dawn Askin	British Columbia	Marla Mallett; Grace MacInnes; Diane Gushulak; Jacalyn Brown	Quebec	Marie-France Larouche; Nancy Bélanger; Annie Lemay; Joëlle Sabourin	Victoria, British Columbia
2010	Canada	Jennifer Jones; Cathy Overton-Clapham; Jill Officer; Dawn Askin	Prince Edward Island	Erin Carmody; Geri-Lynn Ramsay; Kathy O'Rourke; Tricia Affleck	Ontario	Krista McCarville; Tara George; Ashley Miharija; Kari MacLean	Sault Ste. Marie, Ontario
2011	Saskatchewan	Amber Holland; Kim Schneider; Tammy Schneider; Heather Kalenchuk	Canada	Jennifer Jones; Kaitlyn Lawes; Jill Officer; Dawn Askin	Nova Scotia	Heather Smith-Dacey; Danielle Parsons; Blisse Comstock; Teri Lake	Charlottetown, Prince Edward Island
2012	Alberta	Heather Nedohin; Beth Iskiw; Jessica Mair; Laine Peters	British Columbia	Kelly Scott; Sasha Carter; Dailene Sivertson; Jacquie Armstrong	Manitoba	Jennifer Jones; Kaitlyn Lawes; Jill Officer; Dawn Askin	Red Deer, Alberta
2013	Ontario	Rachel Homan; Emma Miskew; Alison Kreviazuk; Lisa Weagle	Manitoba	Jennifer Jones; Kaitlyn Lawes; Jill Officer; Dawn Askin	British Columbia	Kelly Scott; Jeanna Schraeder; Sasha Carter; Sarah Wazney	Kingston, Ontario
2014	Canada	Rachel Homan; Emma Miskew; Alison Kreviazuk; Lisa Weagle	Alberta	Val Sweeting; Joanne Courtney; Dana Ferguson; Rachelle Pidherny	Manitoba	Chelsea Carey; Kristy McDonald; Kristen Foster; Lindsay Titheridge	Montreal, Quebec
2015	Manitoba	Jennifer Jones; Kaitlyn Lawes; Jill Officer; Dawn McEwen	Alberta	Val Sweeting; Lori Olson-Johns; Dana Ferguson; Rachelle Brown	Canada	Rachel Homan; Emma Miskew; Joanne Courtney; Lisa Weagle	Moose Jaw, Saskatchewan
2016	Alberta	Chelsea Carey; Amy Nixon; Jocelyn Peterman; Laine Peters	Northern Ontario	Krista McCarville; Kendra Lilly; Ashley Sippala; Sarah Potts	Canada	Jennifer Jones; Kaitlyn Lawes; Jill Officer; Dawn McEwen	Grande Prairie, Alberta
2017	Ontario	Rachel Homan; Emma Miskew; Joanne Courtney; Lisa Weagle	Manitoba	Michelle Englot; Kate Cameron; Leslie Wilson-Westcott; Raunora Westcott	Canada	Chelsea Carey; Amy Nixon; Jocelyn Peterman; Laine Peters	St. Catharines, Ontario
2018	Manitoba	Jennifer Jones; Shannon Birchard; Jill Officer; Dawn McEwen	(Manitoba) Wild Card	Kerri Einarson; Selena Kaatz; Liz Fyfe; Kristin MacCuish	Nova Scotia	Mary-Anne Arsenault; Christina Black; Jenn Baxter; Jennifer Crouse	Penticton, British Columbia
2019	Alberta	Chelsea Carey; Sarah Wilkes; Dana Ferguson; Rachelle Brown	Ontario	Rachel Homan; Emma Miskew; Joanne Courtney; Lisa Weagle	Saskatchewan	Robyn Silvernagle; Stefanie Lawton; Jessie Hunkin; Kara Thevenot	Sydney, Nova Scotia
2020	Manitoba	Kerri Einarson; Val Sweeting; Shannon Birchard; Briane Meilleur	Ontario	Rachel Homan; Emma Miskew; Joanne Courtney; Lisa Weagle	(Manitoba) Wild Card	Jennifer Jones; Kaitlyn Lawes; Jocelyn Peterman; Dawn McEwen	Moose Jaw, Saskatchewan
2021	Canada	Kerri Einarson; Val Sweeting; Shannon Birchard; Briane Meilleur	Ontario	Rachel Homan; Emma Miskew; Sarah Wilkes; Joanne Courtney	Alberta	Laura Walker; Kate Cameron; Taylor McDonald; Rachelle Brown	Calgary, Alberta
2022	Canada	Kerri Einarson; Val Sweeting; Shannon Birchard; Briane Meilleur	Northern Ontario	Krista McCarville; Kendra Lilly; Ashley Sippala; Sarah Potts	New Brunswick	Andrea Crawford; Sylvie Quillian; Jillian Babin; Katie Forward	Thunder Bay, Ontario
2023	Canada	Kerri Einarson; Val Sweeting; Shannon Birchard; Briane Harris	Manitoba	Jennifer Jones; Karlee Burgess; Mackenzie Zacharias; Emily Zacharias; Lauren Lenentine	Northern Ontario	Krista McCarville; Kendra Lilly; Ashley Sippala; Sarah Potts	Kamloops, British Columbia
2024	Ontario (Homan)	Rachel Homan; Tracy Fleury; Emma Miskew; Sarah Wilkes	Manitoba (Jones)	Jennifer Jones; Karlee Burgess; Emily Zacharias; Lauren Lenentine	Manitoba (Cameron)	Kate Cameron; Meghan Walter; Kelsey Rocque; Mackenzie Elias	Calgary, Alberta
2025	Canada	Rachel Homan; Tracy Fleury; Emma Miskew; Sarah Wilkes	Manitoba (Einarson)	Kerri Einarson; Val Sweeting; Karlee Burgess; Krysten Karwacki	Nova Scotia	Christina Black; Jill Brothers; Jenn Baxter; Karlee Everist; Marlee Powers	Thunder Bay, Ontario
2026	Canada	Kerri Einarson; Val Sweeting; Shannon Birchard; Karlee Burgess	Manitoba (Lawes)	Kaitlyn Lawes; Selena Njegovan; Laura Walker; Kristin Gordon	Alberta (Sturmay)	Selena Sturmay; Danielle Schmiemann; Dezaray Hawes; Paige Papley	Mississauga, Ontario
2027							Charlottetown, Prince Edward Island

=== Top 3 finishes table ===
As of the 2026 Scotties Tournament of Hearts Finals (Note: When Team Canada wins are added to provincial tallies, Manitoba has 17 gold medals, Saskatchewan has 12, British Columbia has 10, Ontario has 9, and Nova Scotia has 7. All others would remain unadjusted.)

Province / Locale	1st	2nd	3rd	Total
Canada	14	7	7	28
Manitoba	11	16	9	36
Saskatchewan	11	6	8	25
British Columbia	9	8	10	27
Alberta	8	10	6	24
Ontario	7	9	13	29
Nova Scotia	4	3	7	14
Quebec	1	2	3	6
New Brunswick	1	2	2	5
Newfoundland and Labrador	0	3	3	6
Prince Edward Island	0	2	2	4
Northern Ontario	0	2	1	3
Wild Card	0	1	1	2
Yukon/Northwest Territories	0	0	1	1
Northwest Territories				
Nunavut				
Yukon				

== Award winners ==
=== Sandra Schmirler Most Valuable Player Award ===
The Sandra Schmirler Most Valuable Player Award is awarded by the media to the most valuable player during the playoffs at the Scotties Tournament of Hearts. The 2025 winner was Rachel Homan of Team Canada.

=== Shot of the Week Award ===
The Shot of the Week Award is presented by the organizing committee to the player who makes the most outstanding shot during the tournament. The award has not been presented since 2013.

=== Marj Mitchell Sportsmanship Award ===
The Marj Mitchell Sportsmanship Award is awarded annually to the most sportsmanlike curler at the Tournament of Hearts every year. The award has been presented since 1982, and has been named in Mitchell's honour since 1998. In 2025, the Marj Mitchell Sportsmanship Award was presented to Nancy Martin of Saskatchewan.

=== Joan Mead Builder Award ===
The Joan Mead Builder Award, named after CBC producer Joan Mead, goes to someone in the curling community that significantly contributes to the growth and development of women's curling in Canada. It has been awarded annually since 2001.

Winners

- 2001: Lloyd Stansell
- 2002: Warren Hansen
- 2003: Vic Rauter
- 2004: Vera Pezer
- 2005: Shirley Morash
- 2006: Robin Wilson
- 2007: Muriel Fage
- 2008: Don Wittman
- 2009: Linda Bolton
- 2010: Anne Merklinger
- 2011: Elaine Dagg-Jackson, Canadian Curling Association National Team Coach
- 2012: Cheryl Bernard, four-time Scotties Tournament of Hearts participant, Olympic silver medalist
- 2013: Andrew Klaver, Scotties Tournament of Hearts photographer
- 2014: Linda Moore
- 2015: Bernadette McIntyre
- 2016: Renée Sonnenberg
- 2017: Wendy Morgan, both Program Manager and national team leader of Curling Canada's wheelchair curling program
- 2018: Melissa Soligo
- 2019: Leslie Ann Walsh
- 2020: Deanna Rindal, umpire at provincial and national curling tournaments
- 2021: Shannon Kleibrink, five-time Scotties Tournament of Hearts participant, Olympic bronze medalist
- 2022: Leslie Kerr, inaugural Executive Director of the Northern Ontario Curling Association from 2007 to 2020, after guiding the amalgamation of 5 regional curling associations into the NOCA.
- 2023: Dianne Barker, umpire at provincial, national, World, and three Olympic curling tournaments, board member of Curl BC and Curling Canada
- 2024: Brenda Rogers, Chief Umpire for the 2024 Scotties Tournament of Hearts, officiated at over 55 National and World Championships since 1995, 20 years experience as Head Official for either Curling Alberta or the Southern Alberta Curling Association
- 2025: Andrea Ronnebeck, a life-long resident of Northern Ontario (Kenora) who has coached athletes of all levels for more than 40 years; including as a team coach at five Scotties Tournaments of Hearts, and serving as Team Leader for Curling Canada's Junior Teams at World Championships.

=== All-Star teams ===
2026

Robin Wilson First Team

- Skip: Kelsey Calvert, Manitoba (Peterson)
- Third: Selena Njegovan, Manitoba (Lawes)
- Second: Michaela Robert, Ontario
- Lead: Karlee Burgess, Canada

Second Team

- Skip: Kerri Einarson, Canada
- Third: Danielle Schmiemann, Alberta (Sturmay)
- Second: Laura Walker, Manitoba (Lawes)
- Lead: Sarah Potts, Northern Ontario

2025

Robin Wilson First Team

- Skip: Rachel Homan, Team Canada
- Third: Tracy Fleury, Team Canada
- Second: Sarah Koltun, British Columbia
- Lead: Samantha Fisher, British Columbia

Second Team

- Skip: Laurie St-Georges, Quebec
- Third: Val Sweeting, Manitoba (Einarson)
- Second: Jocelyn Peterman, Manitoba (Lawes)
- Lead: Krysten Karwacki, Manitoba (Einarson)

2024

Robin Wilson First Team

- Skip: Rachel Homan, Ontario (Homan)
- Third: Tracy Fleury, Ontario (Homan)
- Second: Emma Miskew, Ontario (Homan)
- Lead: Krysten Karwacki, Team Canada

Second Team

- Skip: Kerri Einarson, Team Canada
- Third: Karlee Burgess, Manitoba (Jones)
- Second: Shannon Birchard, Team Canada
- Lead: Sarah Wilkes, Ontario (Homan)

2023

First Team

- Skip: Kerri Einarson, Team Canada
- Third: Val Sweeting, Team Canada
- Second: Shannon Birchard, Team Canada
- Lead: Sarah Potts, Northern Ontario

Second Team

- Skip: Rachel Homan, Ontario
- Third: Laura Walker, Wild Card 1
- Second: Emma Miskew, Ontario
- Lead: Briane Harris, Team Canada

2022

First Team

- Skip: Kerri Einarson, Team Canada
- Third: Val Sweeting, Team Canada
- Second: Shannon Birchard, Team Canada
- Lead: Briane Meilleur, Team Canada

Second Team

- Skip: Selena Njegovan, Wild Card 1
- Third: Sarah Wilkes, Wild Card 3
- Second: Ashley Sippala, Northern Ontario
- Lead: Kerry Galusha, Northwest Territories (skip; threw lead stones)

2021

First Team

- Skip: Kerri Einarson, Team Canada
- Third: Val Sweeting, Team Canada
- Second: Shannon Birchard, Team Canada
- Lead: Lisa Weagle, Manitoba

Second Team

- Skip: Rachel Homan, Ontario
- Third: Selena Njegovan, Wild Card 1
- Second: Jocelyn Peterman, Manitoba
- Lead: Joanne Courtney, Ontario

2020

First Team

- Skip: Rachel Homan, Ontario
- Third: Val Sweeting, Manitoba
- Second: Shannon Birchard, Manitoba
- Lead: Lisa Weagle, Ontario

Second Team

- Skip: Kerri Einarson, Manitoba
- Third: Emma Miskew, Ontario
- Second: Joanne Courtney, Ontario
- Lead: Rachelle Brown, Team Canada

2019

First Team

- Skip: Rachel Homan, Ontario
- Third: Emma Miskew, Ontario
- Second: Jen Gates, Northern Ontario
- Lead: Dawn McEwen, Team Canada

Second Team

- Skip: Krista McCarville, Northern Ontario
- Third: Kendra Lilly, Northern Ontario
- Second: Joanne Courtney, Ontario
- Lead: Sarah Potts, Northern Ontario

2018

First Team

- Skip: Jennifer Jones, Manitoba
- Third: Cary-Anne McTaggart, Alberta
- Second: Jill Officer, Manitoba
- Lead: Dawn McEwen, Manitoba

Second Team

- Skip: Tracy Fleury, Northern Ontario
- Third: Shannon Birchard, Manitoba
- Second: Jessie Scheidegger, Alberta
- Lead: Raunora Westcott, Team Canada

2017

First Team

- Skip: Rachel Homan, Ontario
- Third: Emma Miskew, Ontario
- Second: Joanne Courtney, Ontario
- Lead: Blaine de Jager, British Columbia

Second Team

- Skip: Chelsea Carey, Team Canada
- Third: Shannon Aleksic, British Columbia
- Second: Sarah Wilkes, Alberta
- Lead: Lisa Weagle, Ontario

2016

First Team

- Skip: Jennifer Jones, Team Canada
- Third: Kaitlyn Lawes, Team Canada
- Second: Jill Officer, Team Canada
- Lead: Dawn McEwen, Team Canada

Second Team

- Skip: Chelsea Carey, Alberta
- Third: Ashley Howard, Saskatchewan
- Second: Liz Fyfe, Manitoba
- Lead: Sarah Potts, Northern Ontario

2015

First Team

- Skip: Stefanie Lawton, Saskatchewan
- Third: Kaitlyn Lawes, Manitoba
- Second: Jill Officer, Manitoba
- Lead: Dawn McEwen, Manitoba

Second Team

- Skip: Jennifer Jones, Manitoba
- Third: Lori Olson-Johns, Alberta
- Second: Stephanie Schmidt, Saskatchewan
- Lead: Lisa Weagle, Team Canada

2014

First Team

- Skip: Rachel Homan, Team Canada
- Third: Emma Miskew, Team Canada
- Second: Alison Kreviazuk, Team Canada
- Lead: Teri Lake, Nova Scotia

Second Team

- Skip: Chelsea Carey, Manitoba
- Third: Sherry Anderson, Saskatchewan
- Second: Sherri Singler, Saskatchewan
- Lead: Morgan Court, Ontario

2013

First Team

- Skip: Jennifer Jones, Manitoba
- Third: Kaitlyn Lawes, Manitoba
- Second: Alison Kreviazuk, Ontario
- Lead: Dawn Askin, Manitoba

Second Team

- Skip: Rachel Homan, Ontario
- Third: Jeanna Schraeder, British Columbia
- Second: Jill Officer, Manitoba
- Lead: Laine Peters, Canada

2012

First Team

- Skip: Jennifer Jones, Manitoba
- Third: Kaitlyn Lawes, Manitoba
- Second: Jill Officer, Manitoba
- Lead: Dawn Askin, Manitoba

Second Team

- Skip: Kelly Scott, British Columbia
- Third: Beth Iskiw, Alberta
- Second: Jessica Mair, Alberta
- Lead: Laine Peters, Alberta

2011

First Team

- Skip: Jennifer Jones, Team Canada
- Third: Kaitlyn Lawes, Team Canada
- Second: Jill Officer, Team Canada
- Lead: Dawn Askin, Team Canada

Second Team

- Skip: Amber Holland, Saskatchewan
- Third: Kim Schneider, Saskatchewan
- Second: Tammy Schneider, Saskatchewan
- Lead: Chelsey Bell, Alberta

2010

First Team

- Skip: Kelly Scott, British Columbia
- Third: Cathy Overton-Clapham, Team Canada
- Second: Jill Officer, Team Canada
- Lead: Dawn Askin, Team Canada

Second Team

- Skip: Jennifer Jones, Team Canada
- Third: Jeanna Schraeder, British Columbia
- Second: Sasha Carter, British Columbia
- Lead: Jacquie Armstrong, British Columbia

2009

First Team

- Skip: Stefanie Lawton, Saskatchewan
- Third: Cathy Overton-Clapham, Team Canada
- Second: Diane Gushulak, British Columbia
- Lead: Lana Vey, Saskatchewan

Second Team

- Skip: Marla Mallett, British Columbia
- Third: Grace MacInnes, British Columbia
- Second: Sherri Singler, Saskatchewan
- Lead: Joëlle Sabourin, Quebec

2008

First Team

- Skip: Shannon Kleibrink, Alberta
- Third: Amy Nixon, Alberta
- Second: Jill Officer, Manitoba
- Lead: Chelsey Bell, Alberta

Second Team

- Skip: Sherry Middaugh, Ontario
- Third: Cathy Overton-Clapham, Manitoba
- Second: Sasha Carter, Team Canada
- Lead: Dawn Askin, Manitoba

2007

First Team

- Skip: Kelly Scott, Team Canada
- Third: Jeanna Schraeder, Team Canada
- Second: Jill Officer, Manitoba
- Lead: Marcia Gudereit, Saskatchewan

Second Team

- Skip: Jan Betker, Saskatchewan
- Third: Lana Vey, Saskatchewan
- Second: Sasha Carter, Team Canada
- Lead: Darah Provencal, British Columbia

2006

First Team

- Skip: Kelly Scott, British Columbia
- Third: Jeanna Schraeder, British Columbia
- Second: Mary-Anne Arsenault, Nova Scotia
- Lead: Georgina Wheatcroft, Team Canada

Second Team

- Skip: Heather Strong, Newfoundland and Labrador
- Third: Cathy Overton-Clapham, Team Canada
- Second: Sasha Carter, British Columbia
- Lead: Nancy Delahunt, Nova Scotia

2005

First Team

- Skip: Jennifer Jones, Manitoba
- Third: Marliese Miller, Saskatchewan
- Second: Dawn Askin, Ontario
- Lead: Nancy Delahunt, Team Canada

Second Team

- Skip: Jenn Hanna, Ontario
- Third: Pascale Letendre, Ontario
- Second: Sherri Singler, Saskatchewan
- Lead: Susan O'Leary, Newfoundland and Labrador

2004

First Team

- Skip: Colleen Jones, Team Canada
- Third: Amy Nixon, Alberta
- Second: Maureen Bonar, Manitoba
- Lead: Nancy Delahunt, Team Canada

Second Team

- Skip: Lois Fowler, Manitoba
- Third: Kim Kelly, Team Canada
- Second: Mary-Anne Arsenault, Team Canada
- Lead: Heather Martin, Newfoundland and Labrador

2003

First Team

- Skip: Colleen Jones, Team Canada
- Third: Sherry Linton, Saskatchewan
- Second: Robyn MacPhee, Prince Edward Island
- Lead: Nancy Delahunt, Team Canada

Second Team

- Skip: Suzanne Gaudet, Prince Edward Island
- Third: Rebecca Jean MacPhee, Prince Edward Island
- Second: Joan McCusker, Saskatchewan
- Lead: Kate Horne, Alberta

2002

First Team

- Skip: Sherry Anderson, Saskatchewan
- Third: Janet Brown, Ontario
- Second: Mary-Anne Waye, Team Canada
- Lead: Nancy Delahunt, Team Canada

Second Team

- Skip: Sherry Middaugh, Ontario
- Third: Lawnie MacDonald, Alberta
- Second: Lynn Fallis-Kurz, Manitoba
- Lead: Allison Franey, New Brunswick

2001

First Team

- Skip: Marie-France Larouche, Quebec
- Third: Kim Kelly, Nova Scotia
- Second: Georgina Wheatcroft, Team Canada
- Lead: Sheri Cordina, Ontario

Second Team

- Skip: Kelley Law, Team Canada
- Third: Lisa Whitaker, British Columbia
- Second: Roberta Materi, Saskatchewan
- Lead: Karen McNamee, Alberta

2000

First Team

- Skip: Connie Laliberte, Manitoba
- Third: Cathy Overton-Clapham, Manitoba
- Second: Karen Daku, Saskatchewan
- Lead: Tricia MacGregor, Prince Edward Island

Second Team

- Skip: Anne Merklinger, Ontario
- Third: Cathy Walter, Saskatchewan
- Second: Debbie Jones-Walker, Manitoba
- Lead: Nancy Delahunt, Team Canada

1999

First Team

- Skip: Colleen Jones, Nova Scotia
- Third: Heather Godberson, Team Canada
- Second: Brenda Bohmer, Team Canada
- Lead: Lou Ann Henry, Prince Edward Island

Second Team

- Skip: Connie Laliberte, Manitoba
- Third: Marcy Balderston, Alberta
- Second: Mary-Anne Waye, Nova Scotia
- Lead: Kate Horne, Team Canada

1998

First Team

- Skip: Cathy Borst, Alberta
- Third: Jan Betker, Team Canada
- Second: Brenda Bohmer, Alberta
- Lead: Marcia Gudereit, Team Canada

Second Team

- Skip: Anne Merklinger, Ontario
- Third: Heather Godberson, Alberta
- Second: Patti McKnight, Ontario
- Lead: Heather Hopkins, Nova Scotia

1997

First Team

- Skip: Sandra Schmirler, Saskatchewan
- Third: Jan Betker, Saskatchewan
- Second: Joan McCusker, Saskatchewan
- Lead: Jane Hooper, Team Canada

Second Team

- Skip: Alison Goring, Ontario
- Third: Heather Godberson, Alberta
- Second: Corie Beveridge, Team Canada
- Lead: Heather Martin, Newfoundland

1996

- Skip: Sherry Scheirich, Saskatchewan
- Third: Kim Gellard, Ontario
- Second: Tricia MacGregor, Prince Edward Island
- Lead: Judy Pendergast, Alberta

1995

- Skip: Rebecca MacPhee, Prince Edward Island
- Third: Kay Montgomery, Saskatchewan
- Second: Joan McCusker, Team Canada
- Lead: Janet Arnott, Manitoba

1994

- Skip: Laura Phillips, Newfoundland
- Third: Jan Betker, Team Canada
- Second: Joan McCusker, Team Canada
- Lead: Kim Kelly, Nova Scotia

1993

- Skip: Sandra Peterson, Saskatchewan
- Third: Cathy Cunningham, Newfoundland
- Second: Patti McKnight, Ontario
- Lead: Mary-Anne Waye, Nova Scotia

1992

- Skip: Lisa Walker, British Columbia
- Third: Kathy Fahlman, Saskatchewan
- Second: Kim Kelly, Nova Scotia
- Lead: Karri Willms, Team Canada

1991

- Skip: Julie Sutton, British Columbia
- Third: Jackie-Rae Greening, Alberta
- Second: Sheri Stewart, New Brunswick
- Lead: Cheryl McPherson, Team Canada

1990

- Skip: Heather Rankin, Nova Scotia
- Third: Jackie-Rae Greening, Alberta
- Second: Andrea Lawes, Ontario
- Lead: Lorie Kehler, Saskatchewan

1989

- Skip: Chris More, Manitoba
- Third: Karen Purdy, Manitoba
- Second: Diane Alexander, Alberta
- Lead: Tracy Kennedy, Team Canada

1988

- Skip: Michelle Schneider, Saskatchewan
- Third: Cindy Tucker, British Columbia
- Second: Georgina Hawkes, British Columbia
- Lead: Tracy Kennedy, Ontario

1987

- Skip: Kathie Ellwood, Manitoba
- Third: Sandra Schmirler, Saskatchewan
- Second: Jan Betker, Saskatchewan
- Lead: Sheila Schneider, Saskatchewan

1986

- Skip: Linda Moore, Team Canada
- Third: Kathy McEdwards, Ontario
- Second: Chris Gervais, Saskatchewan
- Lead: Laurie Carney, Team Canada

1985

- Skip: Susan Seitz, Alberta
- Third: Lindsay Sparkes, British Columbia
- Second: Debbie Jones, British Columbia
- Lead: Debbie Herbert, Newfoundland

1984

- Skip: Connie Laliberte, Manitoba
- Third: Gillian Thompson, Saskatchewan
- Second: Chris Gervais, Saskatchewan
- Lead: Laurie Carney, British Columbia

1983

- Skip: Shelly Bildfell, Yukon/Northwest Territories
- Third: Sharon Horne, Nova Scotia
- Second: Cathy Caudle, Nova Scotia
- Lead: Penny Ryan, Alberta

1982

- Skip: Arleen Day, Saskatchewan
- Third: Lynne Andrews, Manitoba
- Second: Donna Cunliffe, British Columbia
- Lead: Barbara Jones-Gordon, Nova Scotia

== Records ==
=== Number of games played ===
As of the 2026 Scotties; excluding pre-qualifying and wild card games

Rank	Player	Team(s)	Games played
1	Colleen Jones	Nova Scotia; Canada	249
2	Jennifer Jones	Manitoba; Canada; Wild Card; Manitoba (Jones)	237
3	Kim Kelly	Nova Scotia; Canada	181
4	Mary-Anne Arsenault	Nova Scotia; Canada; British Columbia	174
5	Kerry Galusha	Northwest Territories/Yukon; Northwest Territories	173
6	Jill Officer	Manitoba; Canada	166
7	Dawn McEwen	Ontario; Manitoba; Canada; Wild Card	164
8	Cathy Overton-Clapham	Manitoba; Canada	159
9	Suzanne Birt	Prince Edward Island	149
10	Emma Miskew	Ontario; Canada; Wild Card 3 Ontario (Homan)	147
10	Krista McCarville	Ontario; Northern Ontario	147
12	Kaitlyn Lawes	Manitoba; Canada; Wild Card; Wild Card 1 Manitoba (Lawes)	142
13	Cathy Cunningham	Newfoundland and Labrador	140
14	Rachel Homan	Ontario; Canada; Ontario (Homan)	139
15	Nancy Delahunt	Nova Scotia; Canada	136
16	Heather Strong	Newfoundland and Labrador	134
17	Andrea Kelly	New Brunswick; Northern Ontario	128
17	Sue Anne Bartlett	Newfoundland	128
19	Heidi Hanlon	New Brunswick	124
19	Val Sweeting	Alberta; Manitoba; Canada; Manitoba (Einarson)	124
21	Kathy Floyd	New Brunswick	121
22	Janet Arnott	Manitoba; Canada	118
23	Kathy Kerr	Newfoundland and Labrador	117
24	Lisa Weagle	Ontario; Canada; Manitoba; Quebec	115
25	Jan Betker	Saskatchewan; Canada	113
25	Connie Laliberte	Manitoba; Canada	113
27	Kerri Einarson	Manitoba; Wild Card; Canada; Manitoba (Einarson)	112
28	Kim Dolan	Prince Edward Island	111
29	Sasha Carter	British Columbia; Canada	105
30	Michelle Englot	Saskatchewan; Manitoba; Canada	104
31	Georgina Wheatcroft	British Columbia; Canada	103
32	Heather Martin	Newfoundland and Labrador	102
33	Marcia Gudereit	Saskatchewan; Canada	101
33	Kelly Scott	British Columbia; Canada	101
35	Sharon Cormier	Northwest Territories/Yukon; Northwest Territories	100
35	Robyn MacPhee	Prince Edward Island	100

=== Perfect games ===
A perfect game in curling is one in which a player scores 100% on all their shots in a game. Statistics on shots have been kept since 1982.

Key
Post-Round Robin game
Final game

Curler	Team	Position	Shots	Year	Opponent
Georgina Hawkes	British Columbia	Third	12	1989	Newfoundland
Heather Martin	Newfoundland	Lead	12	1994	Alberta
Janet Arnott	Manitoba	Lead	20	1994	Saskatchewan
Denise Byers	British Columbia	Lead	18	1999	Manitoba
Lynn Fallis-Kurz	Manitoba	Second	14	2002	Alberta
Nancy Delahunt	Canada	Lead	12	2004	Prince Edward Island
Lois Fowler	Manitoba	Skip	20	2004	Alberta
Susan O'Leary	Newfoundland and Labrador	Lead	20	2005	British Columbia
Jeanna Schraeder	Canada	Third	12	2007	Alberta
Diane Gushulak	British Columbia	Second	20	2009	Alberta
Carolyn Darbyshire	Alberta	Second	14	2009	New Brunswick
Heather Kalenchuk	Canada	Lead	18	2012	Saskatchewan
Stefanie Lawton	Saskatchewan	Skip	18	2014	Quebec
Jackie Reid	Prince Edward Island	Lead	10	2014	Alberta
Rachel Homan (1)	Canada	Skip	18	2014	Newfoundland and Labrador
Teri Lake	Nova Scotia	Lead	16	2014	Ontario
Dawn McEwen	Manitoba	Lead	12	2015	British Columbia
Jessie Scheidegger	Alberta	Second	16	2018	British Columbia
Kate Cameron	Canada	Third	20	2018	Prince Edward Island
Krista McCarville	Northern Ontario	Skip	20	2020	Alberta
Christina Black	Nova Scotia	Skip	18	2022	Yukon
Kerri Einarson	Canada	Skip	16	2023	Prince Edward Island
Sarah Wilkes	Ontario (Homan)	Lead	12	2024	Yukon
Mackenzie Elias	Manitoba (Cameron)	Lead	16	2024	Ontario (Inglis)
Rachel Homan (2)	Ontario (Homan)	Skip	16	2024	British Columbia (Grandy)
Samantha Fisher (1)	British Columbia	Lead	12	2025	Nunavut
Samantha Fisher (2)	British Columbia	Lead	16	2025	Prince Edward Island
Rachel Homan (3)	Canada	Skip	18	2025	Manitoba (Einarson)
Dayna Demmans	Saskatchewan	Lead	20	2026	Northwest Territories
Margot Flemming	Alberta (Skrlik)	Third	18	2026	Nunavut

== See also ==
- Montana's Brier (men's)
- Scottish Women's Curling Championship
- United States Curling Women's Championships

== External links and sources ==
- Official website
- Results Archive
- Curlingzone.com
