= Linda Moore =

Canadian curler

Medal record

Women's curling

Representing Canada

Olympic Games (demonstration)
Gold medal – first place	1988 Calgary	Women's

World Championships
Gold medal – first place	1985 Jönköping	Women's

Representing British Columbia

Scott Tournament of Hearts
Gold medal – first place	1985 Winnipeg	
Silver medal – second place	1986 London	
Bronze medal – third place	1984 Charlottetown	

Linda Moore (born Linda J. Tweedie, February 24, 1954) is a Canadian world champion curler. From 1989 until 2014, she was a member of the TSN curling coverage team along with Vic Rauter and Ray Turnbull (replaced by Russ Howard in 2010).

== Career ==
Moore was born in Vancouver. While enrolled as Masters of Business Administration student at the University of British Columbia, Moore, a laid-off schoolteacher skipped the British Columbia team to the 1985 Scott Tournament of Hearts championship and went on to win the world championship that year. As skip of the defending champion Team Canada, she lost in the finals of the 1986 Scott Tournament of Hearts to Marilyn Darte after going 10-1 through the roundrobin. Moore was selected as skip on the tournament's all-star team.

Moore's rink defeated Connie Laliberte in the finals of the Canadian Olympic trials in 1987 and she skipped the Canadian team that finished first at the demonstration event at the 1988 Winter Olympics in Calgary.

In 1989, she succeeded Vera Pezer as a member of TSN's curling broadcast team. She also served as executive director of Curl BC for 19 years. On December 1, 2014, TSN announced that Moore had retired from broadcasting, citing an unspecified chronic health condition.

== See also ==
- Delbrook Senior Secondary School
