= Colonial Square Ladies Classic =

World Curling Tour event

- Established: 1983
- Host city: Saskatoon, Saskatchewan
- Arena: Nutana Curling Club
- Purse: CAD$27,000
- 2019 champion: (Ontario) Rachel Homan

Current edition
- 2019 Colonial Square Ladies Classic

Location in Canada

The Colonial Square Ladies Classic is an annual women's curling tournament held at the Nutana Curling Club in Saskatoon, Saskatchewan. The tournament has run since 1983 and is part of the Women's World Curling Tour. From 2012 to 2014, the Colonial Square Classic was a Grand Slam event on the women's World Curling Tour.

The event began in February 1983 as the "Mid-Winter Classic", and was billed as the "richest women's bonspiel in the world". However, it failed to attract the top names in women's curling due to competition with the Tournament of Hearts and mixed playdowns, so the event was moved to November in 1984. Despite being moved to the Fall, it kept the "Mid-Winter" name until Labatt's Lite sponsored the event in 1987.

== Event names ==
- 1983-1984: Molson Mid-Winter Classic
- 1985-1986: Mid-Winter Curling Classic
- 1987: Labatt's Lite Women's Curling Classic
- 1988: Labatt's Lite–Canadian Airlines Ladies Classic
- 1989-1990: Labatt's Lite Classic
- 1991-1995: SunLife Ladies Curling Classic
- 1996-2004: Park Town Hotel Ladies Classic
- 2005: Park Town Ladies Curling Classic
- 2006: Colonial Square Ladies Curling Classic
- 2007–present: Colonial Square Ladies Classic

== Past champions ==
Year	Winning team	Runner up	Purse (CAD)
1983	(Manitoba) Chris More, Donna Brownridge, Pat Malanchuk, Joan Bubbs	(Ontario) Marilyn Bodogh	$18,000
1984 (Mar.)	(Saskatchewan) Carol Davis, Sandra Schmirler, Heather MacMillan, Laurie Secord	(Saskatchewan) Nancy Kerr, Kathy Fahlman, Debbie Fiola, Wendy Leach	$18,000
1984 (Nov.)	(Saskatchewan) Carolyn Mrack, Judy Leonard, Sherry Hand, Maxine Montgomery	(Manitoba) Connie Laliberte, Janice Sandison, Corinne Peters, Janet Arnott	$18,000
1985	(Ontario) Marilyn Darte, Kathy McEdwards, Christine Jurgenson, Jan Augustyn	(Alberta) Cordella Schwengler, Carol Thompson, Connie Bennett, Barb Senyk	
1986	(Saskatchewan) Lori McGeary, Patti Vande, Gillian Thompson, Sheila Kavanagh	(Saskatchewan) Merle Kopach, Linda Horley, Illa Davis, Gail Cooper	$23,000
1987	(Alberta) Karen Powell, Marcy Balderston, Tina Listhaehge, Lianna Martin	(Saskatchewan) Heather MacMillan, Kim Armbruster, Laurie Secord, Bev Beckett	
1988	(Ontario) Marilyn Bodogh-Darte, Kathy McEdwards, Christine Bodogh-Jurgenson, Heather Bayne	(Germany) Andrea Schöpp, Monika Wagner, Ingvill Githmark, Billie McMahon-Sørum	
1989	(Saskatchewan) Kim Armbruster, Laurie Secord, Twila Wasden, Karen Saworski	(Alberta) Carolyn Revet, Cheryl Dow, Kelly Anne Bykowky, Lynn Braybrook	
1990	(British Columbia) Kerrylyn Richard, Penny Ryan (skip), Liz Folk, Iris Neilson	(Alberta) Deb Shermack	
1991	(Saskatchewan) Michelle Schneider, Kathy Fahlman, Joan Stricker, Lorie Kehler	(Manitoba) Connie Fennell, Elaine Delannoy, Brenda Garnett, Pearl Kalechyn	
1992	(Alberta) Shannon Kleibrink, Sandra Jenkins, Sally Shighiro, Joanne Wright	(Manitoba) Karen Fallis, Debbie Jones-Walker, Lynne Fallis, Susan Baleja	
1993	(Saskatchewan) Sandra Peterson, Jan Betker, Joan McCusker, Marcia Gudereit	(Alberta) Karen Powell, Heather Moore, Janet Plante, Janet Gummer	
1994	(Saskatchewan) Sandra Peterson, Jan Betker, Joan McCusker, Marcia Gudereit	(Saskatchewan) Sherry Anderson, Kay Montgomery, Donna Gignac, Elaine McCloy	$25,400
1995	(Saskatchewan) Sherry Anderson, Kay Montgomery, Donna Gignac, Elaine McCloy	(Saskatchewan) Michelle Schneider, Atina Ford, Cindy Ford, Patti Grant	
1996	(British Columbia) Kelley Owen, Marla Geiger, Sherry Fraser, Christine Jurgenson	(Saskatchewan) Sherry Scheirich, Colleen Zielke, Sandra Mulroney, Judy Leonard	
1997	(Saskatchewan) Sherry Scheirich	(Saskatchewan) Kim Hodson	
1998	(Alberta) Renelle Bryden, Sandra Jenkins, Nicole Stefaniuk, Cindy Ford	(Saskatchewan) Amber Holland	
1999	(Saskatchewan) Michelle Ridgway, Lorie Kehler, Roberta Materi, Joan Stricker	(Saskatchewan) Atina Ford, Nancy Inglis, Cori Hoag, Susan Hoffart	$22,800
2000	(Saskatchewan) Sherry Anderson, Kim Hodson, Sandra Mulroney, Donna Gignac	(Alberta) Heather Fowlie, Carolyn Darbyshire, Shannon Nimmo, Denise Martin	$40,000
2001	(Saskatchewan) Sherry Anderson, Kim Hodson, Sandra Mulroney, Donna Gignac	(Saskatchewan) Susan Altman, Caroline Virgin, Arva Goodman, Marcie Indzeoski	
2002	(Saskatchewan) Sherry Anderson, Kim Hodson, Sandra Mulroney, Donna Gignac	(Saskatchewan) Nancy Inglis, Tanya Gray, Danita Zacharias, Lisa Kuski	
2003	(Saskatchewan) Cathy Trowell, Susan Lang, Tanya Herback, Maureen Belanger	(Saskatchewan) Nancy Inglis	
2004	(Ontario) Sherry Middaugh, Kirsten Wall, Andrea Lawes, Sheri Greenman	(Alberta) Renée Sonnenberg, Nikki Smith, Twyla Bruce, Tina McDonald	$31,000
2005	(Saskatchewan) Stefanie Lawton, Marliese Kasner, Sherri Singler, Chelsey Bell	(Saskatchewan) Candace Chisholm, Tamara Greenbank, Natalie Greenbank, Kristy Wilson	$31,000
2006	(Manitoba) Jennifer Jones, Cathy Overton-Clapham, Jill Officer, Dana Allerton	(Saskatchewan) Karen Purdy, Penny Roy, Susan Lang, Patty Bell	$31,000
2007	(Saskatchewan) Stefanie Lawton, Marliese Kasner, Sherri Singler, Lana Vey	(Alberta) Cathy King, Lori Olson, Raylene Rocque, Tracy Bush	$31,000
2008	(Saskatchewan) Stefanie Lawton, Marliese Kasner, Sherri Singler, Lana Vey	(Saskatchewan) Michelle Englot, Deanna Doig, Roberta Materi, Cindy Simmons	$35,000
2009	(Saskatchewan) Stefanie Lawton, Marliese Kasner, Sherri Singler, Lana Vey	(Switzerland) Mirjam Ott, Carmen Schäfer, Carmen Küng, Janine Greiner	$35,000
2010	(Saskatchewan) Stefanie Lawton, Sherry Anderson, Sherri Singler, Marliese Kasner	(Manitoba) Jennifer Jones, Kaitlyn Lawes, Jill Officer, Dawn Askin	$26,000
2011	(Alberta) Crystal Webster, Erin Carmody, Geri-Lynn Ramsay, Samantha Preston	(Alberta) Valerie Sweeting, Leslie Rogers, Joanne Taylor, Rachelle Pidherny	$26,000
2012	(Saskatchewan) Stefanie Lawton, Sherry Anderson, Sherri Singler, Marliese Kasner	(Manitoba) Chelsea Carey, Kristy Jenion, Kristen Foster, Lindsay Titheridge	$54,000
2013	(Manitoba) Jennifer Jones, Kaitlyn Lawes, Jill Officer, Dawn McEwen	(Switzerland) Michèle Jäggi, Marisa Winkelhausen, Stéphanie Jäggi, Melanie Barbezat	$54,000
2014	(Scotland) Eve Muirhead, Anna Sloan, Vicki Adams, Sarah Reid	(Ontario) Sherry Middaugh, Jo-Ann Rizzo, Lee Merklinger, Lori Eddy	$47,000
2015	(Ontario) Krista McCarville, Kendra Lilly, Ashley Sippala, Sarah Potts	(Saskatchewan) Sherry Anderson, Jessica Hanson, Elyse Lagrance, Brie Spilchen	$50,000
2016	(China) Wang Bingyu, Zhou Yan, Liu Jinli, Yang Ying	(Scotland) Eve Muirhead, Kelly Schafer, Vicki Adams, Lauren Gray	$40,000
2017	(Manitoba) Shannon Birchard, Nicole Sigvaldason, Sheyna Andries, Mariah Mondor	(Manitoba) Jennifer Jones, Kaitlyn Lawes, Jill Officer, Dawn McEwen	$27,000
2018	(Manitoba) Darcy Robertson, Karen Klein, Vanessa Foster, Theresa Cannon	(Japan) Sayaka Yoshimura, Kaho Onodera, Anna Ohmiya, Yumie Funayama	$27,000
2019	(Ontario) Rachel Homan, Emma Miskew, Joanne Courtney, Lisa Weagle	(Manitoba) Tracy Fleury, Selena Njegovan, Liz Fyfe, Kristin MacCuish	$30,000
2020	Cancelled		
