= Kathy McEdwards =

Canadian female curler

- Curler
- Other names: Kathy Young; Ace (nickname)
- Born: August 16, 1957 (age 69); Hamilton, Ontario

Team
- Curling club: St. Catharines CC, St. Catharines, ON

Curling career
- Member Association: Ontario
- Hearts: 2 (1986, 1987)
- World Championship: 1 (1986)
Medal record
Curling
Representing Canada
World Championships
Gold medal – first place	1986 Kelowna
Representing Ontario
Scotties Tournament of Hearts
Gold medal – first place	1986 London

Kathy McEdwards (born August 16, 1957, in Hamilton, Ontario) is a Canadian curler from Dundas, Ontario.

She is a 1986 World women's champion and a 1986 Canadian women's champion. At the time of the 1986 World Championships, she worked in the sales department for The Hamilton Spectator.

== Teams and events ==
Season	Skip	Third	Second	Lead	Alternate	Events
1985–86	Marilyn Darte	Kathy McEdwards	Chris Jurgenson	Jan Augustyn	Lynn Reynolds (and coach)	STOH 1986 (gold); WCC 1986 (gold)
1986–87	Marilyn Darte	Kathy McEdwards	Chris Jurgenson	Jan Augustyn	Lynn Reynolds	STOH 1987 (9th)
1987–88	Marilyn Darte	Kathy McEdwards	Chris Jurgenson	Sandra Rippel		COCT 1987 (6th)
