= Jan Augustyn =

Canadian curler

- Curler
- Born: 1962 (age 63–64)

Team
- Curling club: St. Catharines CC, St. Catharines, ON

Curling career
- Member Association: Ontario
- Hearts: 2 (1986, 1987)
- World Championship: 1 (1986)
Medal record
Curling
Representing Canada
World Championships
Gold medal – first place	1986 Kelowna
Representing Ontario
Scotties Tournament of Hearts
Gold medal – first place	1986 London

Jan Augustyn (born 1962) is a Canadian curler from Hamilton, Ontario.

She is a 1986 World women's champion and a 1986 Canadian women's champion. At the time of the 1986 World Championships, she worked as a teacher's aid in Burlington, Ontario, and was an avid lacrosse player.

== Teams and events ==
Season	Skip	Third	Second	Lead	Alternate	Events
1985–86	Marilyn Darte	Kathy McEdwards	Chris Jurgenson	Jan Augustyn	Lynn Reynolds (STOH)	STOH 1986 (gold); WCC 1986 (gold)
1986–87	Marilyn Darte	Kathy McEdwards	Chris Jurgenson	Jan Augustyn	Lynn Reynolds	STOH 1987 (9th)
