= 2026 Canadian U18 Curling Championships =

- Host city: Timmins, Ontario
- Arena: McIntyre Curling Club
- Dates: February 8–14
- Men's winner: Quebec 1
- Curling club: CC Grand-Mère, Grand-Mère
- Skip: Raphaël Tremblay
- Third: Louis-François Brassard
- Second: Nathan Beaudoin-Gendron
- Lead: Olivier St-Pierre
- Finalist: Ontario 2 (Genjaga)
- Women's winner: Saskatchewan
- Curling club: Sutherland CC, Saskatoon
- Skip: Renée Wood
- Third: Edie Jardine
- Second: Amelia Whiting
- Lead: Winnie Morin
- Alternate: Abby Hogeboom
- Finalist: Ontario 1 (Wilson)

The 2026 Canadian U18 Curling Championships were held from February 8 to 14 at the McIntyre Curling Club in Timmins, Ontario. This was the eighth edition of the Canadian U18 Curling Championships.

The 2026 edition also continued to use the twenty-one-team format, splitting the teams into three pools of seven. The top four teams from each pool at the end of the round robin advanced to the playoff round. Based on results from the 2025 event, certain provinces earned two berths to the championship. On the boy's side, seven provinces earned a second birth; Alberta, Manitoba, Northern Ontario, Nova Scotia, Ontario, Quebec and Saskatchewan earned a second spot. Because Yukon did not send a girls' team, there were eight provinces who also received a second berth in the girls' event; Alberta, British Columbia, Manitoba, New Brunswick, Northern Ontario, Nova Scotia, Ontario, and Quebec.

== Medallists ==
Under-18	Gold	Silver	Bronze
Men	Quebec 1 Raphaël Tremblay; Louis-François Brassard; Nathan Beaudoin-Gendron; Olivier St-Pierre	Ontario 2 Aaron Genjaga; Aidan Campbell; Theo Barbosa; Jonathan Blais; Justin Anderson	Ontario 1 Tyler MacTavish; Aaron Benning; Alec Symeonides; Liam Rowe; Owen MacTavish
Women	Saskatchewan; Renée Wood; Edie Jardine; Amelia Whiting; Winnie Morin; Abby Hogeboom	Ontario 1 Charlotte Wilson; Amelia Benning; Abby Rushton; Sydney Anderson; Olivia Moore	Manitoba 2 Caitlyn McPherson; Julie Magnusson; Jorja Buhr; Anais McCormick

== Men ==
=== Teams ===
The teams are listed as follows:

Province / Territory	Skip	Third	Second	Lead	Alternate	Club(s)
Alberta 1	Parker Harris	Logan Smith	Jack Odeen	Reed Jones		Crestwood CC, Edmonton
Alberta 2	Nolan Duncan	Spencer Else	Robert Nelson	Evan Clark	Charles Snider	North Hill CC, Calgary; Sexsmith CC, Sexsmith; Saville Community SC, Edmonton
British Columbia	Matthew Reynolds	Sam Carson	Jasper Tersmette	Kyle Scott	Julian Arndt	Kimberley CC, Kimberley
Manitoba 1	Evan Boutet	Luc Cormier	Bryce Buchel	Quinn Lagace		Heather CC, Winnipeg
Manitoba 2	Tyler Graham	Jake Kowalchuk	Alex Newcombe	Johannas Magnusson		Gimli CC, Gimli
New Brunswick	Evan Hanson	Jack Hoyt	Graydon Andrew	Max Lavoie		Capital WC, Fredericton; Gage Golf & CC, Oromocto
Newfoundland and Labrador	Zachery French	Lucas Cole	Lucas Wall	Benjamin Kennedy		St. John's CC, St. John's
Northern Ontario 1	Riley Winters	Wesley Decary	Grayson Gribbon	Aidan Baxter		North Bay GC, North Bay
Northern Ontario 2	Jacob Curtis	Warren Stroud	Owen Weiss	Kain Cristofaro		Port Arthur CC, Port Arthur
Northwest Territories	Jasper Willkomm	Atticus Willkomm	Clark Nendsa	Jett Etter		Inuvik CC, Inuvik
Nova Scotia 1	Elex Lockhart	Jacob MacKay	Marcus Hannam	Sam Crouse	Kevin Ouellette	Berwick CC, Berwick
Nova Scotia 2	Henry Salzman	Lennox Francis	Brody Coughran	Jakob Spry	Will Chisholm	Curl Bridgewater, Bridgewater
Nunavut	Ciaran Robinson	David Hoyt	Nicholas Smith	Noah Smith		Iqaluit CC, Iqaluit
Ontario 1	Tyler MacTavish	Aaron Benning	Alec Symeonides	Liam Rowe	Owen MacTavish	KW Granite Club, Waterloo
Ontario 2	Aaron Genjaga	Aidan Campbell	Theo Barbosa	Jonathan Blais	Justin Anderson	Dixie CC, Mississauga
Prince Edward Island	Aaron Haight	Landon Seaman	Ephraim Fraser	Colin Waite		Cornwall CC, Cornwall
Quebec 1	Raphaël Tremblay	Louis-François Brassard	Nathan Beaudoin-Gendron	Olivier St-Pierre		CC Grand-Mère, Grand-Mère
Quebec 2	Zachary Janidlo	Coby Olszewski	Nicolas Janidlo	Cole Richard	Charles Janidlo	Pointe-Claire CC, Pointe-Claire
Saskatchewan 1	Brandon Weiss	Josh Lussier	Tyler Derksen	Carter Nelson		Esterhazy CC, Esterhazy
Saskatchewan 2	Quinn Snow	David Denis	Liam Regush	Tristan Heal		Nutana CC, Saskatoon
Yukon	Aaron Solberg	Nolan Floyd	Roman Snider	Darwin Murray		Whitehorse CC, Whitehorse

=== Round robin standings ===
Final Round Robin Standings

Key
Teams to Playoffs

Pool A	Skip	W	L
Quebec 2	Zachary Janidlo	6	0
Newfoundland and Labrador	Zachery French	4	2
Ontario 2	Aaron Genjaga	4	2
Manitoba 1	Evan Boutet	3	3
Nova Scotia 1	Elex Lockhart	2	4
Yukon	Aaron Solberg	2	4
Northwest Territories	Jasper Willkomm	0	6

Pool B	Skip	W	L
Ontario 1	Tyler MacTavish	6	0
Alberta 1	Parker Harris	4	2
Northern Ontario 2	Jacob Curtis	4	2
Saskatchewan 2	Quinn Snow	3	3
New Brunswick	Evan Hanson	2	4
Prince Edward Island	Aaron Haight	2	4
Nunavut	Ciaran Robinson	0	6

Pool C	Skip	W	L
Quebec 1	Raphaël Tremblay	5	1
Alberta 2	Nolan Duncan	4	2
Saskatchewan 1	Brandon Weiss	4	2
Northern Ontario 1	Riley Winters	3	3
British Columbia	Matthew Reynolds	2	4
Manitoba 2	Tyler Graham	2	4
Nova Scotia 2	Henry Salzman	1	5

=== Round robin results ===
All draw times are listed in Eastern Time (UTC−05:00).

==== Draw 1 ====
Sunday, February 8, 9:00 am

Sheet A	1	2	3	4	5	6	7	8	Final
Manitoba 1 (Boutet)	0	0	1	0	0	0	0	X	1
Quebec 2 (Janidlo) 🔨	4	0	0	0	2	1	1	X	8

Sheet B	1	2	3	4	5	6	7	8	Final
Nova Scotia 1 (Lockhart)	0	0	2	0	1	0	1	0	4
Ontario 2 (Genjaga) 🔨	0	2	0	1	0	1	0	1	5

Sheet C	1	2	3	4	5	6	7	8	Final
Saskatchewan 1 (Weiss)	0	0	0	0	1	3	2	1	7
Manitoba 2 (Graham) 🔨	0	2	3	1	0	0	0	0	6

Sheet D	1	2	3	4	5	6	7	8	Final
Ontario 1 (MacTavish) 🔨	2	0	0	1	0	1	1	1	6
Saskatchewan 2 (Snow)	0	1	1	0	2	0	0	0	4

Sheet E	1	2	3	4	5	6	7	8	Final
Alberta 1 (Harris) 🔨	0	2	0	0	2	2	0	X	6
Northern Ontario 2 (Curtis)	0	0	2	0	0	0	1	X	3

Sheet F	1	2	3	4	5	6	7	8	Final
New Brunswick (Hanson) 🔨	0	5	2	3	0	3	X	X	13
Nunavut (Robinson)	1	0	0	0	3	0	X	X	4

Sheet G	1	2	3	4	5	6	7	8	Final
Newfoundland and Labrador (French) 🔨	2	1	0	1	2	0	3	X	9
Northwest Territories (Willkomm)	0	0	2	0	0	1	0	X	3

Sheet H	1	2	3	4	5	6	7	8	Final
Quebec 1 (Tremblay) 🔨	0	0	1	0	0	3	1	1	6
Alberta 2 (Duncan)	1	0	0	0	2	0	0	0	3

Sheet I	1	2	3	4	5	6	7	8	Final
Northern Ontario 1 (Winters)	0	0	3	0	0	3	0	X	6
Nova Scotia 2 (Salzman) 🔨	1	0	0	1	1	0	1	X	4

==== Draw 3 ====
Sunday, February 8, 8:00 pm

Sheet A	1	2	3	4	5	6	7	8	Final
Saskatchewan 1 (Weiss) 🔨	3	0	4	0	2	0	1	X	10
Nova Scotia 2 (Salzman)	0	1	0	1	0	1	0	X	3

Sheet B	1	2	3	4	5	6	7	8	Final
Manitoba 2 (Graham)	0	0	1	0	2	0	0	X	3
Alberta 2 (Duncan) 🔨	3	2	0	1	0	2	4	X	12

Sheet C	1	2	3	4	5	6	7	8	Final
Northern Ontario 2 (Curtis)	0	0	1	1	1	2	1	X	6
Saskatchewan 2 (Snow) 🔨	1	1	0	0	0	0	0	X	2

Sheet D	1	2	3	4	5	6	7	8	Final
Nova Scotia 1 (Lockhart) 🔨	2	0	0	2	0	3	0	X	7
Northwest Territories (Willkomm)	0	1	0	0	3	0	1	X	5

Sheet E	1	2	3	4	5	6	7	8	Final
Ontario 2 (Genjaga)	0	0	1	0	0	1	0	X	2
Quebec 2 (Janidlo) 🔨	0	1	0	1	3	0	1	X	6

Sheet F	1	2	3	4	5	6	7	8	Final
Manitoba 1 (Boutet) 🔨	0	2	0	0	1	0	2	0	5
Yukon (Solberg)	1	0	2	1	0	1	0	1	6

Sheet G	1	2	3	4	5	6	7	8	Final
Quebec 1 (Tremblay) 🔨	3	0	3	0	2	0	3	X	11
British Columbia (Reynolds)	0	1	0	4	0	1	0	X	6

Sheet H	1	2	3	4	5	6	7	8	Final
Alberta 1 (Harris) 🔨	3	0	0	5	3	3	X	X	14
Nunavut (Robinson)	0	1	0	0	0	0	X	X	1

Sheet I	1	2	3	4	5	6	7	8	Final
Ontario 1 (MacTavish)	0	2	1	2	1	0	1	X	7
Prince Edward Island (Haight) 🔨	1	0	0	0	0	1	0	X	2

==== Draw 5 ====
Monday, February 9, 2:00 pm

Sheet A	1	2	3	4	5	6	7	8	Final
Northern Ontario 2 (Curtis) 🔨	0	3	1	4	0	0	X	X	8
Prince Edward Island (Haight)	0	0	0	0	1	0	X	X	1

Sheet B	1	2	3	4	5	6	7	8	Final
Saskatchewan 2 (Snow) 🔨	3	5	1	0	2	4	X	X	15
Nunavut (Robinson)	0	0	0	2	0	0	X	X	2

Sheet C	1	2	3	4	5	6	7	8	Final
Quebec 2 (Janidlo) 🔨	0	5	3	1	0	2	X	X	11
Northwest Territories (Willkomm)	0	0	0	0	1	0	X	X	1

Sheet D	1	2	3	4	5	6	7	8	Final
Manitoba 2 (Graham) 🔨	1	0	0	2	0	2	1	0	6
British Columbia (Reynolds)	0	4	1	0	1	0	0	1	7

Sheet E	1	2	3	4	5	6	7	8	Final
Alberta 2 (Duncan)	0	0	0	2	0	1	0	0	3
Nova Scotia 2 (Salzman) 🔨	0	1	0	0	0	0	1	2	4

Sheet F	1	2	3	4	5	6	7	8	Final
Saskatchewan 1 (Weiss)	1	0	1	0	0	2	0	X	4
Northern Ontario 1 (Winters) 🔨	0	3	0	1	4	0	2	X	10

Sheet G	1	2	3	4	5	6	7	8	Final
Alberta 1 (Harris)	0	2	0	1	0	0	0	1	4
New Brunswick (Hanson) 🔨	0	0	1	0	1	1	0	0	3

Sheet H	1	2	3	4	5	6	7	8	Final
Ontario 2 (Genjaga) 🔨	2	1	0	2	0	0	2	1	8
Yukon (Solberg)	0	0	1	0	0	1	0	0	2

Sheet I	1	2	3	4	5	6	7	8	Final
Nova Scotia 1 (Lockhart)	0	2	0	1	1	0	1	0	5
Newfoundland and Labrador (French) 🔨	4	0	1	0	0	1	0	1	7

==== Draw 7 ====
Tuesday, February 10, 9:30 am

Sheet A	1	2	3	4	5	6	7	8	Final
Northwest Territories (Willkomm) 🔨	0	2	0	0	2	0	0	0	4
Yukon (Solberg)	0	0	2	1	0	1	0	2	6

Sheet B	1	2	3	4	5	6	7	8	Final
Quebec 2 (Janidlo) 🔨	0	1	0	1	0	1	2	X	5
Newfoundland and Labrador (French)	0	0	1	0	1	0	0	X	2

Sheet C	1	2	3	4	5	6	7	8	9	Final
Alberta 2 (Duncan)	0	0	1	0	0	3	0	3	1	8
Northern Ontario 1 (Winters) 🔨	2	1	0	1	1	0	2	0	0	7

Sheet D	1	2	3	4	5	6	7	8	Final
Nunavut (Robinson)	0	1	0	0	0	2	0	X	3
Prince Edward Island (Haight) 🔨	4	0	3	5	1	0	5	X	18

Sheet E	1	2	3	4	5	6	7	8	Final
Saskatchewan 2 (Snow) 🔨	2	0	0	2	0	1	0	1	6
New Brunswick (Hanson)	0	1	0	0	1	0	2	0	4

Sheet F	1	2	3	4	5	6	7	8	Final
Northern Ontario 2 (Curtis) 🔨	0	0	2	3	0	0	2	1	8
Ontario 1 (MacTavish)	3	2	0	0	3	1	0	0	9

Sheet G	1	2	3	4	5	6	7	8	Final
Ontario 2 (Genjaga)	0	1	3	0	0	0	0	0	4
Manitoba 1 (Boutet) 🔨	1	0	0	1	0	0	0	1	3

Sheet H	1	2	3	4	5	6	7	8	Final
Nova Scotia 2 (Salzman)	0	0	0	2	0	2	0	X	4
British Columbia (Reynolds) 🔨	3	3	1	0	2	0	1	X	10

Sheet I	1	2	3	4	5	6	7	8	Final
Manitoba 2 (Graham) 🔨	0	0	0	0	2	0	X	X	2
Quebec 1 (Tremblay)	2	2	3	1	0	2	X	X	10

==== Draw 9 ====
Tuesday, February 10, 6:30 pm

Sheet A	1	2	3	4	5	6	7	8	Final
British Columbia (Reynolds) 🔨	0	0	1	0	0	1	X	X	2
Northern Ontario 1 (Winters)	3	2	0	2	2	0	X	X	9

Sheet B	1	2	3	4	5	6	7	8	Final
Nova Scotia 2 (Salzman) 🔨	0	1	0	0	1	0	0	X	2
Quebec 1 (Tremblay)	2	0	1	0	0	3	2	X	8

Sheet C	1	2	3	4	5	6	7	8	Final
Nunavut (Robinson)	0	0	0	0	0	0	X	X	0
Ontario 1 (MacTavish) 🔨	0	6	1	0	3	2	X	X	12

Sheet D	1	2	3	4	5	6	7	8	Final
Yukon (Solberg)	0	0	0	0	1	0	2	X	3
Newfoundland and Labrador (French) 🔨	3	1	0	1	0	1	0	X	6

Sheet E	1	2	3	4	5	6	7	8	Final
Northwest Territories (Willkomm)	0	0	1	1	0	0	X	X	2
Manitoba 1 (Boutet) 🔨	3	2	0	0	3	2	X	X	10

Sheet F	1	2	3	4	5	6	7	8	Final
Quebec 2 (Janidlo)	0	3	0	3	0	1	0	X	7
Nova Scotia 1 (Lockhart) 🔨	1	0	1	0	1	0	1	X	4

Sheet G	1	2	3	4	5	6	7	8	Final
Alberta 2 (Duncan) 🔨	1	0	1	1	1	1	0	X	5
Saskatchewan 1 (Weiss)	0	1	0	0	0	0	1	X	2

Sheet H	1	2	3	4	5	6	7	8	Final
Prince Edward Island (Haight) 🔨	0	0	0	0	0	0	1	X	1
New Brunswick (Hanson)	0	2	0	0	1	1	0	X	4

Sheet I	1	2	3	4	5	6	7	8	Final
Saskatchewan 2 (Snow)	0	2	0	0	1	0	3	1	7
Alberta 1 (Harris) 🔨	2	0	1	1	0	2	0	0	6

==== Draw 11 ====
Wednesday, February 11, 2:00 pm

Sheet A	1	2	3	4	5	6	7	8	Final
New Brunswick (Hanson)	1	0	1	0	0	0	1	X	3
Ontario 1 (MacTavish) 🔨	0	0	0	1	1	2	0	X	4

Sheet B	1	2	3	4	5	6	7	8	Final
Prince Edward Island (Haight)	0	2	0	0	1	0	0	X	3
Alberta 1 (Harris) 🔨	2	0	2	1	0	1	0	X	6

Sheet C	1	2	3	4	5	6	7	8	Final
Yukon (Solberg)	0	0	0	0	1	0	X	X	1
Nova Scotia 1 (Lockhart) 🔨	0	1	2	1	0	5	X	X	9

Sheet D	1	2	3	4	5	6	7	8	Final
Northern Ontario 1 (Winters) 🔨	0	3	0	0	1	1	1	0	6
Quebec 1 (Tremblay)	0	0	3	2	0	0	0	2	7

Sheet E	1	2	3	4	5	6	7	8	Final
British Columbia (Reynolds) 🔨	0	0	2	1	1	0	0	0	4
Saskatchewan 1 (Weiss)	1	0	0	0	0	2	2	1	6

Sheet F	1	2	3	4	5	6	7	8	Final
Nova Scotia 2 (Salzman)	0	0	0	1	0	3	1	0	5
Manitoba 2 (Graham) 🔨	0	1	3	0	3	0	0	1	8

Sheet G	1	2	3	4	5	6	7	8	Final
Nunavut (Robinson)	0	0	0	1	0	0	X	X	1
Northern Ontario 2 (Curtis) 🔨	3	1	5	0	4	0	X	X	13

Sheet H	1	2	3	4	5	6	7	8	9	Final
Newfoundland and Labrador (French) 🔨	0	1	0	2	0	0	0	1	0	4
Manitoba 1 (Boutet)	0	0	2	0	2	0	0	0	1	5

Sheet I	1	2	3	4	5	6	7	8	Final
Northwest Territories (Willkomm)	0	0	0	0	0	1	0	X	1
Ontario 2 (Genjaga) 🔨	0	2	2	1	2	0	4	X	11

==== Draw 13 ====
Thursday, February 12, 8:30 am

Sheet A	1	2	3	4	5	6	7	8	Final
Newfoundland and Labrador (French)	0	0	0	1	0	2	0	2	5
Ontario 2 (Genjaga) 🔨	0	1	0	0	2	0	1	0	4

Sheet B	1	2	3	4	5	6	7	8	Final
Manitoba 1 (Boutet) 🔨	2	1	0	3	1	0	1	X	8
Nova Scotia 1 (Lockhart)	0	0	1	0	0	2	0	X	3

Sheet C	1	2	3	4	5	6	7	8	Final
Quebec 1 (Tremblay)	0	3	0	0	0	1	0	X	4
Saskatchewan 1 (Weiss) 🔨	4	0	2	1	1	0	3	X	11

Sheet D	1	2	3	4	5	6	7	8	Final
New Brunswick (Hanson)	0	0	0	1	0	1	0	X	2
Northern Ontario 2 (Curtis) 🔨	0	1	0	0	3	0	4	X	8

Sheet E	1	2	3	4	5	6	7	8	Final
Ontario 1 (MacTavish) 🔨	2	0	3	0	1	0	2	X	8
Alberta 1 (Harris)	0	1	0	1	0	1	0	X	3

Sheet F	1	2	3	4	5	6	7	8	Final
Prince Edward Island (Haight)	1	1	0	0	0	1	5	X	8
Saskatchewan 2 (Snow) 🔨	0	0	1	1	0	0	0	X	2

Sheet G	1	2	3	4	5	6	7	8	Final
Yukon (Solberg)	0	0	0	1	1	0	0	X	2
Quebec 2 (Janidlo) 🔨	1	1	1	0	0	4	1	X	8

Sheet H	1	2	3	4	5	6	7	8	Final
Northern Ontario 1 (Winters) 🔨	1	1	0	0	0	1	0	X	3
Manitoba 2 (Graham)	0	0	1	1	3	0	1	X	6

Sheet I	1	2	3	4	5	6	7	8	Final
British Columbia (Reynolds) 🔨	0	0	0	1	0	1	0	X	2
Alberta 2 (Duncan)	0	1	0	0	3	0	2	X	6

=== Playoffs ===
Qualification Games
8	Alberta 1	5
9	Newfoundland and Labrador	4
5	Ontario 2	8
12	Manitoba 1	3
6	Northern Ontario 2	6
11	Saskatchewan 2	4
7	Alberta 2	4
10	Northern Ontario 1	5

Quarterfinals
1	Quebec 2	9
8	Alberta 1	3
4	Saskatchewan 1	4
5	Ontario 2	6
3	Quebec 1	6
6	Northern Ontario 2	2
2	Ontario 1	5
10	Northern Ontario 1	4

Semifinals
1	Quebec 2	5
5	Ontario 2	6
3	Quebec 1	7
2	Ontario 1	1

Final
5	Ontario 2	5
3	Quebec 1	6
Bronze medal game
1	Quebec 2	3
2	Ontario 1	8

==== Qualification games ====
Thursday, February 12, 4:30 pm

Sheet A	1	2	3	4	5	6	7	8	9	Final
Alberta 1 (Harris) 🔨	0	0	0	1	3	0	0	0	1	5
Newfoundland and Labrador (French)	0	1	0	0	0	2	0	1	0	4

Sheet B	1	2	3	4	5	6	7	8	Final
Ontario 2 (Genjaga) 🔨	0	2	0	3	0	1	2	X	8
Manitoba 1 (Boutet)	0	0	2	0	1	0	0	X	3

Sheet C	1	2	3	4	5	6	7	8	Final
Northern Ontario 2 (Curtis) 🔨	1	1	0	2	0	1	0	1	6
Saskatchewan 2 (Snow)	0	0	1	0	2	0	1	0	4

Sheet D	1	2	3	4	5	6	7	8	Final
Alberta 2 (Duncan) 🔨	1	0	0	3	0	0	0	0	4
Northern Ontario 1 (Winters)	0	2	1	0	0	0	0	2	5

==== Quarterfinals ====
Friday, February 13, 9:30 am

Sheet A	1	2	3	4	5	6	7	8	Final
Quebec 1 (Tremblay) 🔨	2	2	0	0	1	0	1	X	6
Northern Ontario 2 (Curtis)	0	0	0	1	0	1	0	X	2

Sheet B	1	2	3	4	5	6	7	8	Final
Quebec 2 (Janidlo) 🔨	2	0	0	1	0	4	2	X	9
Alberta 1 (Harris)	0	1	1	0	1	0	0	X	3

Sheet C	1	2	3	4	5	6	7	8	Final
Ontario 1 (MacTavish)	0	4	1	0	0	0	0	0	5
Northern Ontario 1 (Winters) 🔨	0	0	0	1	0	1	1	1	4

Sheet E	1	2	3	4	5	6	7	8	Final
Saskatchewan 1 (Weiss)	0	1	0	1	1	1	0	0	4
Ontario 2 (Genjaga) 🔨	1	0	1	0	0	0	3	1	6

==== Semifinals ====
Friday, February 13, 7:30 pm

Sheet B	1	2	3	4	5	6	7	8	Final
Quebec 1 (Tremblay) 🔨	0	4	0	1	0	2	X	X	7
Ontario 1 (MacTavish)	0	0	0	0	1	0	X	X	1

Sheet C	1	2	3	4	5	6	7	8	Final
Quebec 2 (Janidlo) 🔨	1	2	0	0	0	1	1	X	5
Ontario 2 (Genjaga)	0	0	4	1	1	0	0	X	6

==== Bronze medal game ====
Saturday, February 14, 2:30 pm

Sheet A	1	2	3	4	5	6	7	8	Final
Quebec 2 (Janidlo) 🔨	2	0	0	1	0	0	0	X	3
Ontario 1 (MacTavish)	0	1	2	0	1	1	3	X	8

==== Final ====
Saturday, February 14, 2:30 pm

Sheet D	1	2	3	4	5	6	7	8	Final
Ontario 2 (Genjaga) 🔨	1	0	1	0	2	0	1	0	5
Quebec 1 (Tremblay)	0	1	0	1	0	2	0	2	6

=== Consolation Bracket ===
For Seeds 13 to 21

13th/14th
13	British Columbia	7
14	Nova Scotia 1	2

15th/16th
15	New Brunswick	8
16	Manitoba 2	3

17th/18th
17	Prince Edward Island	9
18	Yukon	3

19th/20th			20th/21st
			20	Northwest Territories	17
19	Nova Scotia 2	7	21	Nunavut	1
20	Northwest Territories	4

=== Final standings ===
Place	Team
1st place, gold medalist(s)	Quebec 1
2nd place, silver medalist(s)	Ontario 2
3rd place, bronze medalist(s)	Ontario 1
4	Quebec 2
5	Saskatchewan 1
6	Northern Ontario 2
7	Alberta 1
8	Northern Ontario 1
9	Alberta 2
10	Newfoundland and Labrador
11	Saskatchewan 2
12	Manitoba 1
13	British Columbia
14	Nova Scotia 1
15	New Brunswick
16	Manitoba 2
17	Prince Edward Island
18	Yukon
19	Nova Scotia 2
20	Northwest Territories
21	Nunavut

== Women ==
=== Teams ===
The teams are listed as follows:

Province / Territory	Skip	Third	Second	Lead	Alternate	Club(s)
Alberta 1	Makenzie Kennedy	Savannah Dutka	Sophie Chapman	Sophia Huska	Kyra Doepker	Beaumont CC, Beaumont
Alberta 2	Alena Yurko	Molly Whitbread	Camryn Adams	Kendra Koch		Leduc CC, Leduc; Red Deer CC, Red Deer
British Columbia 1	Megan Rempel	Parker Rempel	Gwyneth Jones	Ella Walker		Kelowna CC, Kelowna; Penticton CC, Penticton
British Columbia 2	Arianna Wu	Jaeda White	Ashley Fenton	Lily Neumann	Kaylee Hogeboom	Cloverdale CC, Surrey; Royal City CC, New Westminster; Langley CC, Langley; Richmond CC, Richmond
Manitoba 1	Karys Buchalter	Ainslee Card	Amy Buchalter	Evangeline Le Heiget		West St. Paul CC, West St. Paul
Manitoba 2	Caitlyn McPherson	Julie Magnusson	Jorja Buhr	Anais McCormick		Gimli CC, Gimli
New Brunswick 1	Maizie Carter	Avery Colwell	Garbielle King	Sophie Duplessis		Gage Golf & CC, Oromocto
New Brunswick 2	Casey Smith	Katie Ellard	Mary Jane Nealis	Madelyn Tubb		Curl Moncton, Moncton
Newfoundland and Labrador	Megan Blandford	Kiersten Devereaux	Hanna Lomholt-Farrell	Katarina Smith		St. John's CC, St. John's
Northern Ontario 1	Lily Wright	Bella McCarville	Aili Chabot	Isabella Bron	Deanna Chilton	Kakabeka Falls CC, Kakabeka Falls
Northern Ontario 2	Rhya Baker	Jorja Catt	Sydney Catt	Caleigh Holmes	Elizabeth Heaslip	Horne Granite CC, Temiskaming Shores
Northwest Territories	Reese Wainman	Brooke Smith	Emelia Maring	Hayden Smith		Inuvik CC, Inuvik
Nova Scotia 1	Emily Pembleton	Mia Botten	Sophie Canning	Hilary Richardson		Mayflower CC, Timberlea
Nova Scotia 2	Myra McEvoy	Drew Clarke	Lila Batherson	Lily MacDonald	Karina Coughran	Lakeshore CC, Lower Sackville
Nunavut	Arianna Atienza	Sophia MacDonald	Naja Ejesiak	– (Note: Team Nunavut (girls) played with only 3 players)		Iqaluit CC, Iqaluit
Ontario 1	Charlotte Wilson	Amelia Benning	Abby Rushton	Sydney Anderson	Olivia Moore	Rideau CC, Ottawa
Ontario 2	Madeline Garrie	Raina Phillips	Danika Keeler	Maisie Cram		Westmount G&CC, Kitchener
Prince Edward Island	Grace Myers	Greta Edgett-Gallant	Norah MacKinnon	Lily Whalley		Cornwall CC, Cornwall
Quebec 1	Summer St-James	Juliette Bergeron	Emma Nguyen	Madeline Nguyen	Jasmine Bédard	Pointe-Claire CC, Pointe-Claire
Quebec 2	Angélie Thomassin	Lily Bernier	Victoria Grégoire	Béatrice Laplante	Noémie Charbonneau	CC Bel-Aire, Mont-Saint-Hilaire; CC St-Lambert, Saint-Lambert
Saskatchewan	Renée Wood	Edie Jardine	Amelia Whiting	Winnie Morin	Abby Hogeboom	Sutherland CC, Saskatoon

=== Round robin standings ===
Final Round Robin Standings

Key
Teams to Playoffs

Pool A	Skip	W	L
Quebec 1	Summer St-James	6	0
Nova Scotia 1	Emily Pembleton	4	2
Alberta 2	Alena Yurko	4	2
Ontario 2	Madeline Garrie	4	2
New Brunswick 1	Maizie Carter	2	4
Prince Edward Island	Grace Myers	1	5
Nunavut	Arianna Atienza	0	6

Pool B	Skip	W	L
British Columbia 1	Megan Rempel	5	1
Northwest Territories	Reese Wainman	4	2
Manitoba 2	Caitlyn McPherson	4	2
Northern Ontario 1	Lily Wright	3	3
Alberta 1	Makenzie Kennedy	2	4
Quebec 2	Angélie Thomassin	2	4
New Brunswick 2	Casey Smith	1	5

Pool C	Skip	W	L
Saskatchewan	Renée Wood	5	1
Ontario 1	Charlotte Wilson	4	2
Nova Scotia 2	Myra McEvoy	3	3
Northern Ontario 2	Rhya Baker	3	3
British Columbia 2	Arianna Wu	2	4
Newfoundland and Labrador	Megan Blandford	2	4
Manitoba 1	Karys Buchalter	2	4

=== Round robin results ===
All draw times are listed in Eastern Time (UTC−05:00).

==== Draw 2 ====
Sunday, February 8, 3:00 pm

Sheet A	1	2	3	4	5	6	7	8	Final
Quebec 1 (St-James)	0	0	1	1	1	1	0	X	4
Alberta 2 (Yurko) 🔨	1	0	0	0	0	0	1	X	2

Sheet B	1	2	3	4	5	6	7	8	Final
New Brunswick 1 (Carter) 🔨	0	0	0	2	0	0	X	X	2
Nova Scotia 1 (Pembleton)	1	1	5	0	1	3	X	X	11

Sheet C	1	2	3	4	5	6	7	8	9	Final
Ontario 1 (Wilson) 🔨	2	0	0	1	2	1	0	1	0	7
Manitoba 1 (Buchalter)	0	2	1	0	0	0	4	0	1	8

Sheet D	1	2	3	4	5	6	7	8	Final
Northern Ontario 1 (Wright) 🔨	0	0	1	3	0	1	0	X	5
New Brunswick 2 (Smith)	0	0	0	0	1	0	1	X	2

Sheet E	1	2	3	4	5	6	7	8	Final
Alberta 1 (Kennedy) 🔨	0	1	0	0	1	0	0	1	3
British Columbia 1 (Rempel)	0	0	0	2	0	1	1	0	4

Sheet F	1	2	3	4	5	6	7	8	Final
Northwest Territories (Wainman) 🔨	1	0	3	0	0	1	0	1	6
Manitoba 2 (McPherson)	0	2	0	0	2	0	1	0	5

Sheet G	1	2	3	4	5	6	7	8	Final
Prince Edward Island (Myers)	0	2	0	1	0	0	2	0	5
Ontario 2 (Garrie) 🔨	2	0	0	0	2	1	0	1	6

Sheet H	1	2	3	4	5	6	7	8	Final
Newfoundland and Labrador (Blandford) 🔨	2	0	0	1	0	1	0	0	4
Northern Ontario 2 (Baker)	0	2	0	0	3	0	3	1	9

Sheet I	1	2	3	4	5	6	7	8	Final
Saskatchewan (Wood) 🔨	0	1	0	1	1	0	3	1	7
British Columbia 2 (Wu)	1	0	1	0	0	1	0	0	3

==== Draw 4 ====
Monday, February 9, 9:30 am

Sheet A	1	2	3	4	5	6	7	8	Final
Northern Ontario 1 (Wright) 🔨	1	1	0	1	1	2	0	X	6
Alberta 1 (Kennedy)	0	0	1	0	0	0	1	X	2

Sheet B	1	2	3	4	5	6	7	8	Final
Northwest Territories (Wainman)	0	1	0	0	0	0	0	X	1
British Columbia 1 (Rempel) 🔨	1	0	1	2	2	1	1	X	8

Sheet C	1	2	3	4	5	6	7	8	Final
Prince Edward Island (Myers) 🔨	2	0	0	0	2	0	1	0	5
Nova Scotia 1 (Pembleton)	0	0	2	3	0	2	0	2	9

Sheet D	1	2	3	4	5	6	7	8	Final
Newfoundland and Labrador (Blandford) 🔨	0	1	0	0	0	0	1	0	2
Ontario 1 (Wilson)	0	0	0	0	0	3	0	3	6

Sheet E	1	2	3	4	5	6	7	8	Final
Saskatchewan (Wood) 🔨	0	1	0	0	0	2	2	0	5
Manitoba 1 (Buchalter)	0	0	2	0	1	0	0	0	3

Sheet F	1	2	3	4	5	6	7	8	Final
Nova Scotia 2 (McEvoy)	0	0	0	2	0	1	0	3	6
Northern Ontario 2 (Baker) 🔨	0	1	1	0	2	0	1	0	5

Sheet G	1	2	3	4	5	6	7	8	Final
Quebec 2 (Thomassin) 🔨	2	0	1	1	0	1	0	1	6
New Brunswick 2 (Smith)	0	2	0	0	1	0	1	0	4

Sheet H	1	2	3	4	5	6	7	8	Final
Quebec 1 (St-James)	0	0	1	0	6	1	1	X	9
New Brunswick 1 (Carter) 🔨	0	1	0	2	0	0	0	X	3

Sheet I	1	2	3	4	5	6	7	8	Final
Nunavut (Atienza)	0	0	0	1	0	1	X	X	2
Alberta 2 (Yurko) 🔨	1	2	3	0	4	0	X	X	10

==== Draw 6 ====
Monday, February 9, 6:30 pm

Sheet A	1	2	3	4	5	6	7	8	9	Final
Saskatchewan (Wood) 🔨	0	2	2	0	0	1	0	0	3	8
Newfoundland and Labrador (Blandford)	0	0	0	1	1	0	2	1	0	5

Sheet B	1	2	3	4	5	6	7	8	Final
Nova Scotia 2 (McEvoy)	0	1	0	1	0	1	0	X	3
Ontario 1 (Wilson) 🔨	1	0	3	0	2	0	2	X	8

Sheet C	1	2	3	4	5	6	7	8	Final
Quebec 2 (Thomassin)	0	2	1	0	1	0	1	X	5
Alberta 1 (Kennedy) 🔨	1	0	0	2	0	4	0	X	7

Sheet D	1	2	3	4	5	6	7	8	Final
Prince Edward Island (Myers) 🔨	0	0	0	1	2	0	1	0	4
Quebec 1 (St-James)	0	0	1	0	0	2	0	2	5

Sheet E	1	2	3	4	5	6	7	8	Final
Nunavut (Atienza)	0	0	0	1	0	1	0	X	2
New Brunswick 1 (Carter) 🔨	1	1	1	0	3	0	5	X	11

Sheet F	1	2	3	4	5	6	7	8	Final
Ontario 2 (Garrie) 🔨	1	0	0	1	0	2	1	0	5
Nova Scotia 1 (Pembleton)	0	1	0	0	2	0	0	1	4

Sheet G	1	2	3	4	5	6	7	8	Final
British Columbia 2 (Wu)	0	1	2	1	0	2	0	X	6
Manitoba 1 (Buchalter) 🔨	1	0	0	0	2	0	1	X	4

Sheet H	1	2	3	4	5	6	7	8	Final
Northwest Territories (Wainman)	1	1	0	2	0	0	0	2	6
Northern Ontario 1 (Wright) 🔨	0	0	2	0	1	1	1	0	5

Sheet I	1	2	3	4	5	6	7	8	Final
Manitoba 2 (McPherson)	0	0	0	0	3	0	1	X	4
British Columbia 1 (Rempel) 🔨	0	2	2	2	0	4	0	X	10

==== Draw 8 ====
Tuesday, February 10, 2:00 pm

Sheet A	1	2	3	4	5	6	7	8	Final
Nunavut (Atienza) 🔨	0	0	0	0	0	0	X	X	0
Prince Edward Island (Myers)	2	1	2	2	1	1	X	X	9

Sheet B	1	2	3	4	5	6	7	8	Final
Ontario 2 (Garrie)	0	0	0	1	0	0	1	X	2
Quebec 1 (St-James) 🔨	0	0	3	0	1	1	0	X	5

Sheet C	1	2	3	4	5	6	7	8	Final
British Columbia 2 (Wu)	1	0	1	2	0	2	0	X	6
Newfoundland and Labrador (Blandford) 🔨	0	2	0	0	1	0	1	X	4

Sheet D	1	2	3	4	5	6	7	8	9	Final
Quebec 2 (Thomassin)	0	0	3	0	2	2	0	0	0	7
Northwest Territories (Wainman) 🔨	0	2	0	1	0	0	2	2	1	8

Sheet E	1	2	3	4	5	6	7	8	Final
Manitoba 2 (McPherson)	0	2	0	2	4	0	0	2	10
Northern Ontario 1 (Wright) 🔨	1	0	1	0	0	2	3	0	7

Sheet F	1	2	3	4	5	6	7	8	Final
New Brunswick 2 (Smith)	2	0	0	1	0	0	1	0	4
Alberta 1 (Kennedy) 🔨	0	0	2	0	1	1	0	3	7

Sheet G	1	2	3	4	5	6	7	8	Final
Alberta 2 (Yurko)	0	3	0	0	1	1	0	3	8
New Brunswick 1 (Carter) 🔨	1	0	2	1	0	0	0	0	4

Sheet H	1	2	3	4	5	6	7	8	Final
Nova Scotia 2 (McEvoy)	0	1	0	0	0	2	0	X	3
Saskatchewan (Wood) 🔨	1	0	1	0	3	0	4	X	9

Sheet I	1	2	3	4	5	6	7	8	Final
Northern Ontario 2 (Baker)	0	1	1	1	4	1	0	X	8
Ontario 1 (Wilson) 🔨	1	0	0	0	0	0	2	X	3

==== Draw 10 ====
Wednesday, February 11, 9:30 am

Sheet A	1	2	3	4	5	6	7	8	9	Final
New Brunswick 2 (Smith)	0	1	0	0	2	2	1	0	1	7
Northwest Territories (Wainman) 🔨	3	0	0	3	0	0	0	0	0	6

Sheet B	1	2	3	4	5	6	7	8	Final
Manitoba 2 (McPherson)	0	2	0	2	2	0	0	1	7
Quebec 2 (Thomassin) 🔨	1	0	1	0	0	1	1	0	4

Sheet C	1	2	3	4	5	6	7	8	Final
Ontario 2 (Garrie) 🔨	2	3	2	1	0	0	X	X	8
Nunavut (Atienza)	0	0	0	0	1	1	X	X	2

Sheet D	1	2	3	4	5	6	7	8	Final
Northern Ontario 2 (Baker) 🔨	0	0	0	1	0	0	0	1	2
Saskatchewan (Wood)	1	1	0	0	0	0	3	0	5

Sheet E	1	2	3	4	5	6	7	8	Final
British Columbia 2 (Wu)	0	1	0	0	0	2	0	X	3
Nova Scotia 2 (McEvoy) 🔨	1	0	1	1	1	0	3	X	7

Sheet F	1	2	3	4	5	6	7	8	Final
Manitoba 1 (Buchalter) 🔨	0	3	1	0	0	0	3	0	7
Newfoundland and Labrador (Blandford)	0	0	0	2	1	3	0	2	8

Sheet G	1	2	3	4	5	6	7	8	Final
British Columbia 1 (Rempel) 🔨	1	0	3	0	3	1	1	X	9
Northern Ontario 1 (Wright)	0	1	0	2	0	0	0	X	3

Sheet H	1	2	3	4	5	6	7	8	Final
Alberta 2 (Yurko) 🔨	2	0	0	5	0	3	X	X	10
Prince Edward Island (Myers)	0	2	0	0	1	0	X	X	3

Sheet I	1	2	3	4	5	6	7	8	Final
Nova Scotia 1 (Pembleton)	0	0	0	1	0	0	X	X	1
Quebec 1 (St-James) 🔨	2	0	3	0	1	3	X	X	9

==== Draw 12 ====
Wednesday, February 11, 6:30 pm

Sheet A	1	2	3	4	5	6	7	8	Final
Manitoba 1 (Buchalter)	0	0	2	1	0	0	1	0	4
Nova Scotia 2 (McEvoy) 🔨	1	1	0	0	1	2	0	2	7

Sheet B	1	2	3	4	5	6	7	8	Final
Northern Ontario 2 (Baker) 🔨	1	0	3	0	5	0	0	X	9
British Columbia 2 (Wu)	0	1	0	2	0	3	1	X	7

Sheet C	1	2	3	4	5	6	7	8	Final
New Brunswick 2 (Smith)	0	2	0	0	0	0	1	X	3
Manitoba 2 (McPherson) 🔨	2	0	1	0	3	1	0	X	7

Sheet D	1	2	3	4	5	6	7	8	Final
Nova Scotia 1 (Pembleton) 🔨	3	1	4	1	2	0	X	X	11
Nunavut (Atienza)	0	0	0	0	0	1	X	X	1

Sheet E	1	2	3	4	5	6	7	8	Final
Alberta 2 (Yurko)	0	1	0	3	0	0	2	1	7
Ontario 2 (Garrie) 🔨	1	0	1	0	1	1	0	0	4

Sheet F	1	2	3	4	5	6	7	8	Final
New Brunswick 1 (Carter) 🔨	1	1	0	3	0	0	3	X	8
Prince Edward Island (Myers)	0	0	1	0	1	2	0	X	4

Sheet G	1	2	3	4	5	6	7	8	Final
Ontario 1 (Wilson) 🔨	1	1	0	2	0	1	0	X	5
Saskatchewan (Wood)	0	0	1	0	1	0	1	X	3

Sheet H	1	2	3	4	5	6	7	8	Final
British Columbia 1 (Rempel) 🔨	0	0	2	0	1	1	0	0	4
Quebec 2 (Thomassin)	3	0	0	3	0	0	0	1	7

Sheet I	1	2	3	4	5	6	7	8	Final
Alberta 1 (Kennedy) 🔨	0	1	0	0	1	2	0	0	4
Northwest Territories (Wainman)	1	0	1	1	0	0	1	1	5

==== Draw 14 ====
Thursday, February 12, 12:30 pm

Sheet A	1	2	3	4	5	6	7	8	Final
New Brunswick 1 (Carter)	0	0	0	2	1	0	0	X	3
Ontario 2 (Garrie) 🔨	0	2	1	0	0	3	0	X	6

Sheet B	1	2	3	4	5	6	7	8	Final
Nova Scotia 1 (Pembleton) 🔨	0	1	0	0	0	3	1	X	5
Alberta 2 (Yurko)	1	0	1	0	1	0	0	X	3

Sheet C	1	2	3	4	5	6	7	8	9	Final
Manitoba 1 (Buchalter) 🔨	1	0	2	0	0	1	0	1	1	6
Northern Ontario 2 (Baker)	0	1	0	1	0	0	3	0	0	5

Sheet D	1	2	3	4	5	6	7	8	Final
Alberta 1 (Kennedy) 🔨	0	1	0	2	0	0	0	X	3
Manitoba 2 (McPherson)	2	0	1	0	3	2	5	X	13

Sheet E	1	2	3	4	5	6	7	8	Final
British Columbia 1 (Rempel) 🔨	3	0	0	1	0	1	2	0	7
New Brunswick 2 (Smith)	0	2	0	0	1	0	0	3	6

Sheet F	1	2	3	4	5	6	7	8	Final
Northern Ontario 1 (Wright)	0	1	2	1	1	0	0	1	6
Quebec 2 (Thomassin) 🔨	1	0	0	0	0	2	1	0	4

Sheet G	1	2	3	4	5	6	7	8	Final
Quebec 1 (St-James) 🔨	4	0	5	0	3	0	X	X	12
Nunavut (Atienza)	0	2	0	1	0	1	X	X	4

Sheet H	1	2	3	4	5	6	7	8	Final
Ontario 1 (Wilson) 🔨	1	0	1	1	1	1	0	X	5
British Columbia 2 (Wu)	0	2	0	0	0	0	1	X	3

Sheet I	1	2	3	4	5	6	7	8	Final
Newfoundland and Labrador (Blandford) 🔨	1	0	1	0	1	1	0	2	6
Nova Scotia 2 (McEvoy)	0	2	0	1	0	0	2	0	5

=== Playoffs ===
Qualification Games
8	Ontario 2	5
9	Manitoba 2	6
5	Ontario 1	8
12	Northern Ontario 2	5
6	Northwest Territories	2
11	Northern Ontario 1	8
7	Alberta 2	1
10	Nova Scotia 2	5

Quarterfinals
1	Quebec 1	6
9	Manitoba 2	9
4	Nova Scotia 1	6
5	Ontario 1	7
3	Saskatchewan	5
11	Northern Ontario 1	4
2	British Columbia 1	4
10	Nova Scotia 2	5

Semifinals
9	Manitoba 2	3
5	Ontario 1	7
3	Saskatchewan	9
10	Nova Scotia 2	6

Final
5	Ontario 1	3
3	Saskatchewan	8
Bronze medal game
9	Manitoba 2	7
10	Nova Scotia 2	6

==== Qualification games ====
Thursday, February 12, 8:30 pm

Sheet A	1	2	3	4	5	6	7	8	Final
Ontario 2 (Garrie) 🔨	0	2	0	2	0	1	0	0	5
Manitoba 2 (McPherson)	0	0	2	0	1	0	2	1	6

Sheet B	1	2	3	4	5	6	7	8	Final
Ontario 1 (Wilson) 🔨	2	0	2	2	0	2	0	X	8
Northern Ontario 2 (Baker)	0	3	0	0	1	0	1	X	5

Sheet C	1	2	3	4	5	6	7	8	Final
Northwest Territories (Wainman) 🔨	0	1	0	1	0	0	0	X	2
Northern Ontario 1 (Wright)	3	0	0	0	2	1	2	X	8

Sheet D	1	2	3	4	5	6	7	8	Final
Alberta 2 (Yurko)	0	0	0	0	1	0	0	X	1
Nova Scotia 2 (McEvoy) 🔨	0	0	1	1	0	0	3	X	5

==== Quarterfinals ====
Friday, February 13, 2:30 pm

Sheet A	1	2	3	4	5	6	7	8	9	Final
Saskatchewan (Wood) 🔨	1	0	0	0	0	2	0	1	1	5
Northern Ontario 1 (Wright)	0	0	0	1	2	0	1	0	0	4

Sheet B	1	2	3	4	5	6	7	8	Final
Quebec 1 (St-James)	0	0	3	0	1	0	2	X	6
Manitoba 2 (McPherson) 🔨	2	2	0	1	0	4	0	X	9

Sheet C	1	2	3	4	5	6	7	8	Final
British Columbia 1 (Rempel)	0	0	2	0	0	0	2	0	4
Nova Scotia 2 (McEvoy) 🔨	1	1	0	0	1	1	0	1	5

Sheet E	1	2	3	4	5	6	7	8	9	Final
Nova Scotia 1 (Pembleton)	3	1	0	0	1	0	0	1	0	6
Ontario 1 (Wilson) 🔨	0	0	1	2	0	3	0	0	1	7

==== Semifinals ====
Saturday, February 14, 9:30 am

Sheet C	1	2	3	4	5	6	7	8	Final
Manitoba 2 (McPherson)	0	0	0	1	0	2	0	X	3
Ontario 1 (Wilson) 🔨	3	1	1	0	1	0	1	X	7

Sheet D	1	2	3	4	5	6	7	8	Final
Saskatchewan (Wood) 🔨	3	0	2	2	1	0	0	1	9
Nova Scotia 2 (McEvoy)	0	1	0	0	0	2	3	0	6

==== Bronze medal game ====
Saturday, February 14, 2:30 pm

Sheet E	1	2	3	4	5	6	7	8	Final
Manitoba 2 (McPherson) 🔨	1	1	0	1	0	1	1	2	7
Nova Scotia 2 (McEvoy)	0	0	3	0	3	0	0	0	6

==== Final ====
Saturday, February 14, 2:30 pm

Sheet C	1	2	3	4	5	6	7	8	Final
Ontario 1 (Wilson)	0	2	0	1	0	0	0	X	3
Saskatchewan (Wood) 🔨	2	0	2	0	1	1	2	X	8

=== Consolation Bracket ===
For Seeds 13 to 21

13th/14th
13	Alberta 1	8
14	New Brunswick 1	6

15th/16th
15	Newfoundland and Labrador	3
16	Manitoba 1	9

17th/18th
17	Quebec 2	11
18	British Columbia 2	1

19th/20th			20th/21st
			20	New Brunswick 2	7
19	Prince Edward Island	7	21	Nunavut	3
20	New Brunswick 2	4

=== Final standings ===
Place	Team
1st place, gold medalist(s)	Saskatchewan
2nd place, silver medalist(s)	Ontario 1
3rd place, bronze medalist(s)	Manitoba 2
4	Nova Scotia 2
5	Quebec 1
6	British Columbia 1
7	Nova Scotia 1
8	Northern Ontario 1
9	Northwest Territories
10	Alberta 2
11	Ontario 2
12	Northern Ontario 2
13	Alberta 1
14	New Brunswick 1
15	Manitoba 1
16	Newfoundland and Labrador
17	Quebec 2
18	British Columbia 2
19	Prince Edward Island
20	New Brunswick 2
21	Nunavut
