= 1986 Scott Tournament of Hearts =

Canadian women's curling championship

- Host city: London, Ontario
- Arena: Thompson Arena
- Dates: February 22–March 1
- Attendance: 21,023
- Winner: Ontario
- Curling club: St. Catharines CC, St. Catharines
- Skip: Marilyn Darte
- Third: Kathy McEdwards
- Second: Chris Jurgenson
- Lead: Jan Augustyn
- Alternate: Lynn Reynolds
- Finalist: Canada (Linda Moore)

The 1986 Scott Tournament of Hearts, the Canadian women's national curling championship, was held from February 22 to March 1, 1986 at the Thompson Arena in London, Ontario. The total attendance for the week was 21,023. It was the first year the defending champions would get a berth into the competition and return as Team Canada, who was skipped by Linda Moore.

Team Ontario, who was skipped by Marilyn Darte won the championship on home soil after defeating defending champion Linda Moore and Team Canada 7–3 in the final. This was the first women's championship for Ontario and the first of two skipped by Darte (later Bodogh). This was the third time that the host province had won the event, joining New Brunswick in 1963 and Saskatchewan in 1972.

Darte's rink would go onto represent Canada at the 1986 World Women's Curling Championship on home soil in Kelowna, British Columbia, which they also won.

The event set or tied several scoring records of which have either been tied or still stand as of 2023.

- In Draw 9, Newfoundland skip Sue Anne Bartlett became the first player in Canadian women's championship history to have played in 100 games.
- Canada's 8–0 victory over Alberta in Draw 8 was the fourth time that a shutout occurred with the others being in 1963, 1970, and 1973. Additionally, this game only lasted four ends, which set a record for the fewest ends played in one game, which has since been matched twice in 1998 and 1999.
- Canada's 3–2 victory over Newfoundland in the semifinal set the following records:
  - The five combined points scored tied a record set in 1971 for the lowest combined score between both teams in one game, which has been matched three times since. This still remains the lowest combined score in a semifinal game.
  - The six blank ends set a new record for most blank ends in one game, which has since been matched twice. This still remains a record for the most blank ends in a semifinal game.
  - Newfoundland blanked three straight ends beginning in the fifth end, which set a record for most consecutive blank ends in a semifinal game which hasn't been broken since.
  - The two points scored by Newfoundland also set a record for fewest points scored in a semifinal game by a single team, which hasn't been broken since either.
- The three points scored in the final by Canada set a record for the fewest points scored in a final by one team. This has been matched three times since (1987, 1992, and 1994).

== Teams ==
The teams were listed as follows:

Team Canada	Alberta	British Columbia	Manitoba
North Shore WC, North Vancouver Skip: Linda Moore; Third: Lindsay Sparkes; Second: Debbie Jones; Lead: Laurie Carney; Alternate: Rae Moir	Beaumont CC, Beaumont Skip: Lil Werenka; Third: May Thompson; Second: Karen Currey; Lead: Jean Slemko; Alternate: Diane Foster	Richmond WC, Richmond Skip: Heather Kerr; Third: Berniece McCallan; Second: Sherry Lethbridge; Lead: Rita Imai; Alternate: Donna Bradley	Deer Lodge CC, Winnipeg Skip: Darcy Kirkness; Third: Barbara Kirkness; Second: Barbara Fetch; Lead: Faye Irwin; Alternate: Lynn Fallis
New Brunswick	Newfoundland	Nova Scotia	Ontario
Capital WC, Fredericton Skip: Grace Donald; Third: Sheri Smith; Second: Carolyn MacKay; Lead: Debbi Dickeson (Note: Team New Brunswick alternate Diane Blair threw lead stones for New Brunswick's final five draws (beginning Draw 10) as lead Debbi Dickeson was sidelined with the flu.); Alternate: Diane Blair	Carol CC, Labrador City Skip: Sue Anne Bartlett; Third: Patricia Dwyer; Second: Joyce Narduzzi; Lead: Debbie Porter; Alternate: Barbara Pinsent	Halifax CC, Halifax Skip: Colleen Jones; Third: Penny LaRocque; Second: Cathy Caudle; Lead: Susan Robinson; Alternate: Barbara Jones-Gordon	St. Catharines CC, St. Catharines Skip: Marilyn Darte; Third: Kathy McEdwards; Second: Chris Jurgenson; Lead: Jan Augustyn; Alternate: Lynn Reynolds
Prince Edward Island	Quebec	Saskatchewan	Yukon/Northwest Territories
Silver Fox CC, Summerside Skip: Barbara Currie; Third: Beverley Miller; Second: Ann Currie; Lead: Marlene Noye; Alternate: Judy Sonier	Chicoutimi CC, Chicoutimi Skip: Helene Bussieres; Third: Gisele Potvin; Second: Muriel Emond; Lead: Pierrette Cossette; Alternate: Lise Carson	Hub City CC, Saskatoon Skip: Lori McGeary; Third: Gillian Thompson; Second: Christine Gervais; Lead: Sheila Kavanagh; Alternate: Joyce McKee	Whitehorse CC, Whitehorse Skip: Shelley Aucoin; Third: Kathy Chapman; Second: Donna Scott; Lead: Debbie Stokes; Alternate: Linda Martin

== Map of teams ==
Team Canada Provincial Winners

== Round Robin Standings ==
Final Round Robin standings

Key
Teams to Playoffs

Team	Skip	W	L	PF	PA	EW	EL	BE	SE	S%
Ontario	Marilyn Darte	10	1	82	47	49	37	6	16	73%
Canada	Linda Moore	10	1	83	40	46	32	11	20	74%
Newfoundland	Sue Anne Bartlett	7	4	83	62	47	40	6	15	67%
Saskatchewan	Lois McGeary	6	5	62	54	40	45	7	10	73%
Quebec	Helene Bussieres	6	5	62	71	43	40	7	14	62%
Manitoba	Darcy Kirkness	6	5	66	65	45	45	8	12	70%
New Brunswick	Grace Donald	5	6	66	73	40	47	6	10	67%
Nova Scotia	Colleen Jones	5	6	67	65	46	45	4	8	70%
Alberta	Lil Werenka	4	7	59	78	44	42	9	16	64%
British Columbia	Heather Kerr	3	8	58	74	41	48	5	12	68%
Yukon/Northwest Territories	Shelley Aucoin	3	8	58	63	42	40	11	11	66%
Prince Edward Island	Barbara Currie	1	10	39	93	29	51	3	5	58%

== Round Robin Results ==
All draw times are listed in Eastern Standard Time (UTC-05:00).

=== Draw 1 ===
Saturday, February 22, 2:30 pm

Sheet A	1	2	3	4	5	6	7	8	9	10	Final
Ontario (Darte) 🔨	0	3	2	1	0	2	0	0	1	X	9
Quebec (Bussieres)	0	0	0	0	2	0	1	1	0	X	4

Sheet B	1	2	3	4	5	6	7	8	9	10	Final
Prince Edward Island (Currie) 🔨	0	0	0	2	0	1	X	X	X	X	3
New Brunswick (Donald)	3	2	4	0	4	0	X	X	X	X	13

Sheet C	1	2	3	4	5	6	7	8	9	10	Final
Saskatchewan (McGeary) 🔨	1	0	1	0	0	1	0	1	0	2	6
Manitoba (Kirkness)	0	0	0	0	1	0	2	0	1	0	4

Sheet D	1	2	3	4	5	6	7	8	9	10	Final
Alberta (Werenka)	0	1	0	2	0	2	0	1	0	X	6
Yukon/Northwest Territories (Aucoin) 🔨	4	0	2	0	1	0	1	0	2	X	10

Sheet E	1	2	3	4	5	6	7	8	9	10	Final
Canada (Moore)	0	0	1	1	0	2	0	1	0	3	8
Nova Scotia (Jones) 🔨	0	0	0	0	1	0	2	0	1	0	4

=== Draw 2 ===
Saturday, February 22, 7:30 pm

Sheet A	1	2	3	4	5	6	7	8	9	10	Final
Canada (Moore)	0	2	1	1	0	0	1	0	0	X	5
Yukon/Northwest Territories (Aucoin) 🔨	1	0	0	0	1	0	0	0	1	X	3

Sheet B	1	2	3	4	5	6	7	8	9	10	Final
Manitoba (Kirkness) 🔨	1	0	0	0	0	1	0	2	1	0	5
Alberta (Werenka)	0	0	0	2	1	0	1	0	0	3	7

Sheet C	1	2	3	4	5	6	7	8	9	10	Final
Quebec (Bussieres) 🔨	0	0	2	0	1	0	0	1	0	X	4
Nova Scotia (Jones)	0	0	0	3	0	0	1	0	2	X	6

Sheet D	1	2	3	4	5	6	7	8	9	10	Final
Ontario (Darte)	0	2	0	1	1	0	2	0	1	X	7
Saskatchewan (McGeary) 🔨	1	0	1	0	0	1	0	1	0	X	4

Sheet E	1	2	3	4	5	6	7	8	9	10	Final
Newfoundland (Bartlett) 🔨	0	2	0	1	3	3	0	0	X	X	9
British Columbia (Kerr)	0	0	0	0	0	0	0	1	X	X	1

=== Draw 3 ===
Sunday, February 23, 2:30 pm

Sheet A	1	2	3	4	5	6	7	8	9	10	Final
Alberta (Werenka) 🔨	1	0	0	2	0	0	2	0	1	1	7
New Brunswick (Donald) 🔨	0	2	1	0	1	0	0	1	0	0	5

Sheet B	1	2	3	4	5	6	7	8	9	10	Final
Newfoundland (Bartlett) 🔨	0	3	0	0	1	0	0	0	2	0	6
Quebec (Bussieres)	1	0	0	2	0	1	2	0	0	1	7

Sheet C	1	2	3	4	5	6	7	8	9	10	Final
Yukon/Northwest Territories (Aucoin) 🔨	0	1	0	1	2	1	0	0	3	X	8
Prince Edward Island (Currie)	0	0	2	0	0	0	1	0	0	X	3

Sheet D	1	2	3	4	5	6	7	8	9	10	Final
British Columbia (Kerr)	0	0	2	0	0	1	0	1	0	X	4
Nova Scotia (Jones) 🔨	1	1	0	2	1	0	1	0	2	X	8

Sheet E	1	2	3	4	5	6	7	8	9	10	Final
Ontario (Darte)	0	0	1	0	2	0	1	1	1	1	7
Canada (Moore) 🔨	2	1	0	0	0	1	0	0	0	0	4

=== Draw 4 ===
Sunday, February 23, 7:30 pm

Sheet A	1	2	3	4	5	6	7	8	9	10	Final
Nova Scotia (Jones) 🔨	2	0	2	0	1	1	1	0	2	X	9
Prince Edward Island (Currie)	0	1	0	1	0	0	0	2	0	X	4

Sheet B	1	2	3	4	5	6	7	8	9	10	Final
Canada (Moore)	0	0	2	1	0	0	0	0	1	1	5
Saskatchewan (McGeary) 🔨	0	1	0	0	0	2	0	0	0	0	3

Sheet C	1	2	3	4	5	6	7	8	9	10	Final
British Columbia (Kerr) 🔨	0	0	1	0	0	0	1	0	2	X	4
Alberta (Werenka)	1	1	0	1	1	1	0	1	0	X	6

Sheet D	1	2	3	4	5	6	7	8	9	10	Final
Manitoba (Kirkness) 🔨	0	0	0	0	3	0	0	1	1	1	6
New Brunswick (Donald)	1	0	0	3	0	0	1	0	0	0	5

Sheet E	1	2	3	4	5	6	7	8	9	10	Final
Yukon/Northwest Territories (Aucoin)	0	0	0	2	1	0	1	0	0	X	4
Newfoundland (Bartlett) 🔨	0	0	1	0	0	2	0	0	3	X	6

=== Draw 5 ===
Monday, February 24, 9:00 am

Sheet C	1	2	3	4	5	6	7	8	9	10	Final
Manitoba (Kirkness)	0	1	0	1	0	0	0	1	0	X	3
Ontario (Darte) 🔨	2	0	0	0	0	4	1	0	1	X	8

Sheet D	1	2	3	4	5	6	7	8	9	10	Final
Saskatchewan (McGeary) 🔨	2	0	1	0	0	4	0	4	X	X	11
Quebec (Bussieres) 🔨	0	1	0	0	1	0	1	0	X	X	3

=== Draw 6 ===
Monday, February 24, 2:00 pm

Sheet A	1	2	3	4	5	6	7	8	9	10	Final
Saskatchewan (McGeary) 🔨	0	0	1	0	2	2	0	4	0	0	9
Alberta (Werenka)	1	1	0	1	0	0	2	0	2	1	8

Sheet B	1	2	3	4	5	6	7	8	9	10	Final
Nova Scotia (Jones) 🔨	0	0	3	0	2	0	1	0	2	0	8
Newfoundland (Bartlett)	1	1	0	3	0	2	0	2	0	1	10

Sheet C	1	2	3	4	5	6	7	8	9	10	Final
Yukon/Northwest Territories (Aucoin) 🔨	1	3	0	1	0	2	3	1	X	X	11
New Brunswick (Donald)	0	0	2	0	1	0	0	0	X	X	3

Sheet D	1	2	3	4	5	6	7	8	9	10	Final
Canada (Moore)	0	1	3	1	3	0	0	1	X	X	9
British Columbia (Kerr) 🔨	0	0	0	0	0	1	1	0	X	X	2

Sheet E	1	2	3	4	5	6	7	8	9	10	Final
Manitoba (Kirkness) 🔨	0	3	0	0	2	1	0	0	0	1	7
Prince Edward Island (Currie)	0	0	2	0	0	0	1	1	1	0	5

=== Draw 7 ===
Monday, February 24, 7:30 pm

Sheet A	1	2	3	4	5	6	7	8	9	10	11	Final
New Brunswick (Donald)	0	1	0	2	0	2	0	0	2	0	1	8
Nova Scotia (Jones) 🔨	1	0	1	0	2	0	1	1	0	1	0	7

Sheet B	1	2	3	4	5	6	7	8	9	10	Final
British Columbia (Kerr)	0	2	0	1	0	0	3	0	0	1	7
Yukon/Northwest Territories (Aucoin) 🔨	1	0	0	0	0	1	0	1	1	0	4

Sheet C	1	2	3	4	5	6	7	8	9	10	Final
Newfoundland (Bartlett) 🔨	0	0	2	1	0	1	0	2	0	X	6
Canada (Moore)	2	3	0	0	1	0	2	0	2	X	10

Sheet D	1	2	3	4	5	6	7	8	9	10	Final
Quebec (Bussieres)	2	1	0	3	1	2	X	X	X	X	9
Prince Edward Island (Currie) 🔨	0	0	1	0	0	0	X	X	X	X	1

Sheet E	1	2	3	4	5	6	7	8	9	10	Final
Alberta (Werenka) 🔨	1	0	0	0	1	0	0	1	0	X	3
Ontario (Darte)	0	0	2	0	0	1	1	0	2	X	6

=== Draw 8 ===
Tuesday, February 25, 9:00 am

Sheet B	1	2	3	4	5	6	7	8	9	10	Final
Alberta (Werenka)	0	0	0	0	X	X	X	X	X	X	0
Canada (Moore) 🔨	4	3	0	1	X	X	X	X	X	X	8

Sheet C	1	2	3	4	5	6	7	8	9	10	11	Final
Nova Scotia (Jones)	0	0	1	0	0	1	0	1	0	0	1	4
Yukon/Northwest Territories (Aucoin) 🔨	0	0	0	0	1	0	1	0	0	1	0	3

=== Draw 9 ===
Tuesday, February 25, 2:00 pm

Sheet A	1	2	3	4	5	6	7	8	9	10	Final
Manitoba (Kirkness) 🔨	0	2	0	0	2	1	0	0	2	X	7
British Columbia (Kerr)	0	0	2	1	0	0	1	1	0	X	5

Sheet B	1	2	3	4	5	6	7	8	9	10	Final
Saskatchewan (McGeary) 🔨	0	1	0	0	0	0	3	1	1	0	6
Nova Scotia (Jones)	2	0	1	0	0	1	0	0	0	1	5

Sheet C	1	2	3	4	5	6	7	8	9	10	Final
Prince Edward Island (Currie) 🔨	3	0	1	0	0	0	0	1	0	X	5
Alberta (Werenka)	0	1	0	2	1	1	1	0	2	X	8

Sheet D	1	2	3	4	5	6	7	8	9	10	Final
Newfoundland (Bartlett) 🔨	0	3	0	1	1	0	2	0	0	1	8
Ontario (Darte)	0	0	3	0	0	1	0	2	1	0	7

Sheet E	1	2	3	4	5	6	7	8	9	10	Final
New Brunswick (Donald) 🔨	2	3	0	3	0	1	0	2	X	X	11
Quebec (Bussieres)	0	0	1	0	1	0	2	0	X	X	4

=== Draw 10 ===
Tuesday, February 25, 7:30 pm

Sheet A	1	2	3	4	5	6	7	8	9	10	Final
Prince Edward Island (Currie)	0	1	0	1	0	0	0	0	X	X	2
Newfoundland (Bartlett) 🔨	1	0	1	0	3	1	1	2	X	X	9

Sheet B	1	2	3	4	5	6	7	8	9	10	Final
Quebec (Bussieres) 🔨	0	1	0	2	0	1	0	3	0	0	7
British Columbia (Kerr)	2	0	0	0	1	0	1	0	1	1	6

Sheet C	1	2	3	4	5	6	7	8	9	10	Final
New Brunswick (Donald) 🔨	1	0	0	0	0	1	0	2	0	X	4
Ontario (Darte)	0	1	0	1	1	0	3	0	1	X	7

Sheet D	1	2	3	4	5	6	7	8	9	10	Final
Canada (Moore) 🔨	1	0	0	2	2	0	3	0	0	X	8
Manitoba (Kirkness)	0	2	0	0	0	1	0	2	1	X	6

Sheet E	1	2	3	4	5	6	7	8	9	10	Final
Saskatchewan (McGeary) 🔨	0	0	1	3	1	0	3	0	X	X	8
Yukon/Northwest Territories (Aucoin)	1	0	0	0	0	1	0	1	X	X	3

=== Draw 11 ===
Wednesday, February 26, 9:00 am

Sheet C	1	2	3	4	5	6	7	8	9	10	Final
Prince Edward Island (Currie) 🔨	4	1	0	0	2	0	1	1	0	X	9
British Columbia (Kerr)	0	0	2	1	0	1	0	0	2	X	6

Sheet D	1	2	3	4	5	6	7	8	9	10	Final
New Brunswick (Donald)	1	1	0	0	2	0	2	0	2	X	8
Newfoundland (Bartlett) 🔨	0	0	2	0	0	2	0	1	0	X	5

=== Draw 12 ===
Wednesday, February 26, 2:00 pm

Sheet A	1	2	3	4	5	6	7	8	9	10	Final
Quebec (Bussieres) 🔨	1	0	1	0	0	0	0	2	0	X	4
Canada (Moore)	0	1	0	1	0	1	2	0	4	X	9

Sheet B	1	2	3	4	5	6	7	8	9	10	Final
Yukon/Northwest Territories (Aucoin) 🔨	0	0	1	1	0	1	0	0	0	X	3
Ontario (Darte)	0	1	0	0	2	0	0	1	1	X	5

Sheet C	1	2	3	4	5	6	7	8	9	10	Final
Alberta (Werenka) 🔨	0	0	3	0	1	1	0	1	0	X	6
Newfoundland (Bartlett)	2	2	0	3	0	0	1	0	5	X	13

Sheet D	1	2	3	4	5	6	7	8	9	10	Final
Saskatchewan (McGeary)	0	0	1	0	2	0	1	0	0	X	4
British Columbia (Kerr) 🔨	1	1	0	1	0	1	0	1	1	X	6

Sheet E	1	2	3	4	5	6	7	8	9	10	Final
Nova Scotia (Jones)	0	1	0	0	2	0	1	0	0	X	4
Manitoba (Kirkness) 🔨	1	0	1	2	0	1	0	1	1	X	7

=== Draw 13 ===
Wednesday, February 26, 7:30 pm

Sheet A	1	2	3	4	5	6	7	8	9	10	Final
Yukon/Northwest Territories (Aucoin) 🔨	0	1	2	0	2	0	1	0	0	X	6
Manitoba (Kirkness)	2	0	0	1	0	3	0	2	1	X	9

Sheet B	1	2	3	4	5	6	7	8	9	10	Final
New Brunswick (Donald)	0	1	1	0	0	0	1	1	0	1	5
Saskatchewan (McGeary) 🔨	1	0	0	1	0	0	0	0	1	0	3

Sheet C	1	2	3	4	5	6	7	8	9	10	11	Final
Ontario (Darte)	0	0	0	1	0	4	0	1	0	0	1	7
Nova Scotia (Jones) 🔨	0	0	1	0	2	0	1	0	0	2	0	6

Sheet D	1	2	3	4	5	6	7	8	9	10	11	Final
Prince Edward Island (Currie) 🔨	1	0	0	0	1	0	0	0	0	1	0	3
Canada (Moore)	0	0	1	0	0	0	0	0	2	0	5	8

Sheet E	1	2	3	4	5	6	7	8	9	10	Final
Quebec (Bussieres) 🔨	0	0	4	0	0	1	0	1	1	X	7
Alberta (Werenka)	0	1	0	0	1	0	2	0	0	X	4

=== Draw 14 ===
Thursday, February 27, 2:00 pm

Sheet A	1	2	3	4	5	6	7	8	9	10	Final
British Columbia (Kerr) 🔨	0	0	2	0	1	0	1	0	2	0	6
Ontario (Darte)	1	1	0	2	0	3	0	0	0	2	9

Sheet B	1	2	3	4	5	6	7	8	9	10	Final
Newfoundland (Bartlett)	0	2	0	1	0	0	1	0	1	X	5
Manitoba (Kirkness) 🔨	1	0	1	0	1	3	0	1	0	X	7

Sheet C	1	2	3	4	5	6	7	8	9	10	Final
Canada (Moore)	0	1	2	1	0	2	0	3	X	X	9
New Brunswick (Donald) 🔨	0	0	0	0	1	0	1	0	X	X	2

Sheet D	1	2	3	4	5	6	7	8	9	10	Final
Yukon/Northwest Territories (Aucoin) 🔨	0	0	0	1	0	0	1	1	0	X	3
Quebec (Bussieres)	2	1	0	0	0	2	0	0	2	X	7

Sheet E	1	2	3	4	5	6	7	8	9	10	Final
Prince Edward Island (Currie)	0	0	0	0	1	1	0	0	0	X	2
Saskatchewan (McGeary) 🔨	1	0	1	0	0	0	1	2	1	X	6

=== Draw 15 ===
Thursday, February 27, 7:30 pm

Sheet A	1	2	3	4	5	6	7	8	9	10	Final
Newfoundland (Bartlett)	0	0	0	2	1	0	0	2	1	X	6
Saskatchewan (McGeary) 🔨	0	1	0	0	0	0	1	0	0	X	2

Sheet B	1	2	3	4	5	6	7	8	9	10	Final
Ontario (Darte) 🔨	2	0	4	0	4	X	X	X	X	X	10
Prince Edward Island (Currie)	0	1	0	1	0	X	X	X	X	X	2

Sheet C	1	2	3	4	5	6	7	8	9	10	Final
Manitoba (Kirkness) 🔨	0	0	0	2	0	0	1	0	2	0	5
Quebec (Bussieres)	0	1	1	0	1	1	0	1	0	1	6

Sheet D	1	2	3	4	5	6	7	8	9	10	Final
Nova Scotia (Jones) 🔨	1	0	3	0	0	2	0	0	0	X	6
Alberta (Werenka)	0	1	0	2	1	0	0	0	0	X	4

Sheet E	1	2	3	4	5	6	7	8	9	10	Final
British Columbia (Kerr) 🔨	3	1	0	4	0	2	1	X	X	X	11
New Brunswick (Donald)	0	0	1	0	1	0	0	X	X	X	2

== Playoffs ==
Semifinal			Final
			1	Ontario	7
2	Canada	3	2	Canada	3
3	Newfoundland	2

=== Semifinal ===
Friday, February 28, 7:30 pm

Sheet D	1	2	3	4	5	6	7	8	9	10	Final
Canada (Moore)	0	0	0	2	0	0	0	0	0	1	3
Newfoundland (Bartlett) 🔨	0	0	1	0	0	0	0	1	0	0	2

Player percentages
Canada		Newfoundland	
Laurie Carney	75%	Debbie Porter	81%
Debbie Jones	84%	Joyce Narduzzi	84%
Lindsay Sparkes	90%	Patricia Dwyer	79%
Linda Moore	84%	Sue Anne Bartlett	74%
Total	83%	Total	79%

=== Final ===
Saturday, March 1, 2:00 pm

Sheet C	1	2	3	4	5	6	7	8	9	10	Final
Ontario (Darte)	1	0	2	1	0	2	0	0	1	X	7
Canada (Moore) 🔨	0	1	0	0	1	0	1	0	0	X	3

Player percentages
Ontario		Canada	
Jan Augustyn	76%	Laurie Carney	80%
Chris Jurgenson	86%	Debbie Jones	85%
Kathy McEdwards	81%	Lindsay Sparkes	80%
Marilyn Darte	71%	Linda Moore	53%
Total	79%	Total	75%

== Statistics ==
=== Top 5 player percentages ===
Final Round Robin Percentages

Key
All-Star Team

Leads	%
(Saskatchewan) Sheila Kavanagh	74
(Canada) Laurie Carney	74
(British Columbia) Rita Imai	73
(Nova Scotia) Susan Robinson	72
(Ontario) Jan Augustyn	70

Seconds	%
(Saskatchewan) Chris Gervais	77
(Nova Scotia) Cathy Caudle	74
(Manitoba) Barbara Fetch	73
(Ontario) Chris Jurgenson	72
(Canada) Debbie Jones	72

Thirds	%
(Ontario) Kathy McEdwards	75
(Manitoba) Barbara Kirkness	74
(British Columbia) Lindsay Sparkes	73
(Newfoundland and Labrador) Patricia Dwyer	70
(Nova Scotia) Penny LaRocque	69
(Saskatchewan) Gillian Thompson	69

Skips	%
(Canada) Linda Moore	76
(Ontario) Marilyn Darte	75
(Saskatchewan) Lori McGeary	72
(Newfoundland and Labrador) Sue Anne Bartlett	68
(Manitoba) Darcy Kirkness	67
(Yukon) Shelley Aucoin	67

== Awards ==
The all-star team and sportsmanship award winners were as follows:

=== All-Star Team ===
Team Canada lead Laurie Carney and Team Saskatchewan second Chris Gervais became the first curlers to be make the all-star team more than once as both previously made the all-star team in 1984.

Position	Name	Team
Skip	Linda Moore	Canada
Third	Kathy McEdwards	Ontario
Second	Chris Gervais (2)	Saskatchewan
Lead	Laurie Carney (2)	Canada

=== Jo Wallace Award ===
The Scotties Tournament of Hearts Sportsmanship Award is presented to the curler who best embodies the spirit of curling at the Scotties Tournament of Hearts. The winner was selected in a vote by all players at the tournament.

Prior to 1998, the award was named after a notable individual in the curling community where the tournament was held that year. For this edition, the award was named after Jo Wallace, a builder in women's curling as she helped organize the "Nifty Fifty" league, the forerunner to the Ontario Senior Ladies Curling Championship and also served as both the vice-president and president of the Canadian Ladies Curling Association.

Name	Team	Position
May Thompson	Alberta	Third
