= 2023 Canadian Curling Club Championships =

Canadian national curling championship edition

2023 Everest Canadian Curling Club Championships
- Host city: Winnipeg, Manitoba
- Arena: Assiniboine Memorial Curling Club
- Dates: November 19–25
- Men's winner: Alberta
- Curling club: Beaumont CC, Beaumont
- Skip: Dan Sherrard
- Third: Brandon Klassen
- Lead: Kyle Reynolds
- Finalist: Saskatchewan (Criton)
- Women's winner: New Brunswick
- Curling club: Gage G&CC, Oromocto
- Skip: Abby Burgess
- Third: Brooke Tracy
- Second: Samantha Crook
- Lead: Hannah Williams
- Coach: Jeremy Tracy
- Finalist: Ontario (Thorne)

The 2023 Everest Canadian Curling Club Championships were held from November 19 to 25 at the Assiniboine Memorial Curling Club in Winnipeg, Manitoba. The event is the Canadian championship for "club-level" curling, that is for curlers who are not currently playing at the high performance level.

== Men ==
=== Teams ===
The teams are listed as follows:

Team	Skip	Third	Second	Lead	Alternate	Club
Alberta	Dan Sherrard	Brandon Klassen	– (Note: Team Alberta played with three players.)	Kyle Reynolds		Beaumont CC, Beaumont
British Columbia	Tyler Orme	Trevor Perepolkin	Rob Nobert	Jamie Austin		Vernon CC, Vernon
Manitoba	Derek Anderson	Justin Hoplock	Mitch Einarson	Chris Sigurdson		Gimli CC, Gimli
New Brunswick	Dan Crouse	Sam Forestell	David DeAdder	Mike Allain		Curl Moncton, Moncton
Newfoundland and Labrador	Bas Buckle	Mike Mullins	Blair Fradsham	Dennis Bruce		Corner Brook CC, Corner Brook
Northern Ontario	Matthew Hunt	Kyle Sherlock	Jake Reid	Scott McDermott		YNCU CC, Sault Ste. Marie
Northwest Territories	Christopher Kelln	David Aho	Trevor Moss	Nicholas Rivet		Yellowknife CC, Yellowknife
Nova Scotia	Doug Mackenzie (Fourth)	Shea Steele (Skip)	Dana Seward	Sean Audas		Halifax CC, Halifax
Nunavut	Peter Van Strien	Mark Pillsworth	Justin McDonell	Adam Fisher		Iqaluit CC, Iqaluit
Ontario	Noel Herron	Steve Lodge	Jason Boyce	Chris Barkley	Jarryd Herron	Royal Kingston CC, Kingston
Prince Edward Island	Darren Higgins	Tim Hockin	Michael Spencer	Alex MacFadyen		Summerside CC, Summerside
Quebec	David Maheux	Kevin Bleau	Michael Charbonneau	Raphaël Charbonneau		Mt. Bruno CC, Saint-Bruno-de-Montarville
Saskatchewan	Mitch Criton	Kyle Cherpin	Brett Murray	– (Note: Team Saskatchewan played with three players.)	Bob Sonder	Highland CC, Regina
Yukon	Terry Miller	Kevin Yost	Matt Johnson	Chris Meger	Don McPhee	Whitehorse CC, Whitehorse

=== Round robin standings ===
Final Round Robin Standings

Key
Teams to Championship Round

Pool A	Skip	W	L
Alberta	Dan Sherrard	6	0
Ontario	Noel Herron	4	2
Nova Scotia	Shea Steele	4	2
New Brunswick	Dan Crouse	4	2
Northern Ontario	Matthew Hunt	2	4
Northwest Territories	Christopher Kelln	1	5
Newfoundland and Labrador	Bas Buckle	0	6

Pool B	Skip	W	L
Saskatchewan	Mitch Criton	4	2
British Columbia	Tyler Orme	4	2
Manitoba	Derek Anderson	4	2
Quebec	David Maheux	3	3
Nunavut	Peter Van Strien	3	3
Yukon	Terry Miller	2	4
Prince Edward Island	Darren Higgins	1	5

=== Round robin results ===
All draws are listed in Central Time (UTC−06:00).

==== Draw 1 ====
Sunday, November 19, 6:00 pm

Sheet A	1	2	3	4	5	6	7	8	Final
New Brunswick (Crouse)	0	0	2	0	0	0	X	X	2
Ontario (Herron)	2	2	0	2	0	5	X	X	11

Sheet D	1	2	3	4	5	6	7	8	Final
Northern Ontario (Hunt)	0	5	0	0	2	0	4	X	11
Newfoundland and Labrador (Buckle)	2	0	1	1	0	1	0	X	5

Sheet F	1	2	3	4	5	6	7	8	Final
Alberta (Sherrard)	1	0	3	4	0	1	X	X	9
Northwest Territories (Kelln)	0	1	0	0	0	0	X	X	1

==== Draw 2 ====
Monday, November 20, 12:00 pm

Sheet B	1	2	3	4	5	6	7	8	Final
Manitoba (Anderson)	0	2	0	3	2	3	X	X	10
Yukon (Miller)	1	0	1	0	0	0	X	X	2

Sheet C	1	2	3	4	5	6	7	8	Final
Prince Edward Island (Higgins)	0	0	3	0	0	2	3	0	8
Quebec (Maheux)	2	1	0	3	1	0	0	3	10

Sheet E	1	2	3	4	5	6	7	8	Final
Nunavut (Van Strien)	1	2	2	0	0	1	0	3	9
British Columbia (Orme)	0	0	0	4	3	0	1	0	8

==== Draw 3 ====
Monday, November 20, 4:00 pm

Sheet A	1	2	3	4	5	6	7	8	Final
Nova Scotia (Steele)	1	0	2	0	3	0	2	X	8
Northwest Territories (Kelln)	0	2	0	1	0	1	0	X	4

Sheet D	1	2	3	4	5	6	7	8	Final
Ontario (Herron)	0	0	4	0	0	2	0	0	6
Alberta (Sherrard)	3	1	0	1	1	0	1	1	8

Sheet F	1	2	3	4	5	6	7	8	Final
Northern Ontario (Hunt)	1	0	0	1	0	0	0	1	3
New Brunswick (Crouse)	0	0	2	0	0	1	1	0	4

==== Draw 4 ====
Monday, November 20, 8:30 pm

Sheet B	1	2	3	4	5	6	7	8	Final
Quebec (Maheux)	3	0	2	2	2	4	X	X	13
Nunavut (Van Strien)	0	3	0	0	0	0	X	X	3

Sheet C	1	2	3	4	5	6	7	8	Final
Yukon (Miller)	1	0	0	0	1	0	2	0	4
Saskatchewan (Criton)	0	0	1	2	0	1	0	1	5

Sheet E	1	2	3	4	5	6	7	8	Final
Manitoba (Anderson)	0	1	0	2	0	0	0	X	3
Prince Edward Island (Higgins)	0	0	3	0	2	0	2	X	7

==== Draw 5 ====
Tuesday, November 21, 9:00 am

Sheet B	1	2	3	4	5	6	7	8	Final
New Brunswick (Crouse)	0	4	0	2	0	1	1	X	8
Northwest Territories (Kelln)	1	0	1	0	1	0	0	X	3

Sheet C	1	2	3	4	5	6	7	8	Final
Newfoundland and Labrador (Buckle)	2	0	1	0	0	1	0	X	4
Ontario (Herron)	0	2	0	2	4	0	2	X	10

Sheet E	1	2	3	4	5	6	7	8	Final
Northern Ontario (Hunt)	0	0	2	1	0	2	0	0	5
Nova Scotia (Steele)	0	4	0	0	2	0	2	1	9

==== Draw 6 ====
Tuesday, November 21, 12:30 pm

Sheet A	1	2	3	4	5	6	7	8	Final
Nunavut (Van Strien)	0	0	0	1	1	0	X	X	2
Yukon (Miller)	3	6	3	0	0	3	X	X	15

Sheet D	1	2	3	4	5	6	7	8	9	Final
Saskatchewan (Criton)	2	0	2	0	1	0	0	1	0	6
Manitoba (Anderson)	0	3	0	1	0	2	0	0	1	7

Sheet F	1	2	3	4	5	6	7	8	Final
British Columbia (Orme)	0	2	0	3	1	0	1	X	7
Quebec (Maheux)	1	0	1	0	0	2	0	X	4

==== Draw 7 ====
Tuesday, November 21, 4:00 pm

Sheet B	1	2	3	4	5	6	7	8	Final
Alberta (Sherrard)	0	2	0	1	0	0	0	3	6
Nova Scotia (Steele)	2	0	1	0	0	1	1	0	5

Sheet C	1	2	3	4	5	6	7	8	Final
Northwest Territories (Kelln)	0	1	0	1	0	1	0	X	3
Northern Ontario (Hunt)	2	0	1	0	3	0	4	X	10

Sheet E	1	2	3	4	5	6	7	8	Final
New Brunswick (Crouse)	3	0	0	1	0	0	2	X	6
Newfoundland and Labrador (Buckle)	0	1	1	0	1	1	0	X	4

==== Draw 8 ====
Tuesday, November 21, 7:30 pm

Sheet A	1	2	3	4	5	6	7	8	Final
Prince Edward Island (Higgins)	0	0	0	2	0	1	0	0	3
British Columbia (Orme)	0	0	1	0	1	0	0	2	4

Sheet D	1	2	3	4	5	6	7	8	Final
Yukon (Miller)	0	0	0	3	0	1	0	X	4
Quebec (Maheux)	1	1	1	0	2	0	3	X	8

Sheet F	1	2	3	4	5	6	7	8	Final
Saskatchewan (Criton)	0	0	2	0	0	0	0	X	2
Nunavut (Van Strien)	0	2	0	1	1	0	2	X	6

==== Draw 9 ====
Wednesday, November 22, 9:00 am

Sheet A	1	2	3	4	5	6	7	8	Final
Quebec (Maheux)	0	0	2	2	0	1	0	X	5
Manitoba (Anderson)	5	3	0	0	2	0	1	X	11

Sheet B	1	2	3	4	5	6	7	8	Final
Saskatchewan (Criton)	2	1	0	1	0	1	2	X	7
British Columbia (Orme)	0	0	1	0	1	0	0	X	2

Sheet C	1	2	3	4	5	6	7	8	Final
New Brunswick (Crouse)	1	1	0	1	0	1	0	X	4
Alberta (Sherrard)	0	0	4	0	4	0	1	X	9

Sheet D	1	2	3	4	5	6	7	8	Final
Prince Edward Island (Higgins)	1	1	0	0	2	0	0	1	5
Nunavut (Van Strien)	0	0	2	1	0	2	1	0	6

Sheet E	1	2	3	4	5	6	7	8	Final
Northwest Territories (Kelln)	1	0	0	0	0	0	0	X	1
Ontario (Herron)	0	1	1	0	1	1	2	X	6

Sheet F	1	2	3	4	5	6	7	8	9	Final
Nova Scotia (Steele)	0	0	2	1	2	0	0	0	3	8
Newfoundland and Labrador (Buckle)	1	1	0	0	0	1	1	1	0	5

==== Draw 11 ====
Wednesday, November 22, 4:00 pm

Sheet A	1	2	3	4	5	6	7	8	Final
Newfoundland and Labrador (Buckle)	1	0	2	0	1	0	0	X	4
Alberta (Sherrard)	0	2	0	1	0	3	3	X	9

Sheet B	1	2	3	4	5	6	7	8	Final
Northern Ontario (Hunt)	0	1	0	1	1	0	0	X	3
Ontario (Herron)	0	0	3	0	0	3	2	X	8

Sheet C	1	2	3	4	5	6	7	8	Final
Manitoba (Anderson)	0	0	0	2	0	1	0	X	3
British Columbia (Orme)	1	0	1	0	1	0	4	X	7

Sheet D	1	2	3	4	5	6	7	8	Final
Nova Scotia (Steele)	0	0	1	0	2	0	1	0	4
New Brunswick (Crouse)	1	1	0	2	0	1	0	2	7

Sheet E	1	2	3	4	5	6	7	8	Final
Quebec (Maheux)	0	0	1	0	0	0	X	X	1
Saskatchewan (Criton)	3	3	0	1	1	1	X	X	9

Sheet F	1	2	3	4	5	6	7	8	Final
Yukon (Miller)	1	0	1	0	2	1	0	1	6
Prince Edward Island (Higgins)	0	1	0	2	0	0	0	0	3

==== Draw 13 ====
Thursday, November 23, 9:00 am

Sheet A	1	2	3	4	5	6	7	8	Final
Saskatchewan (Criton)	1	1	1	2	0	2	0	X	7
Prince Edward Island (Higgins)	0	0	0	0	1	0	1	X	2

Sheet B	1	2	3	4	5	6	7	8	9	Final
Newfoundland and Labrador (Buckle)	0	1	0	2	1	0	2	0	0	6
Northwest Territories (Kelln)	1	0	1	0	0	3	0	1	2	8

Sheet C	1	2	3	4	5	6	7	8	Final
Nova Scotia (Steele)	1	1	0	0	2	0	4	X	8
Ontario (Herron)	0	0	1	1	0	2	0	X	4

Sheet D	1	2	3	4	5	6	7	8	Final
British Columbia (Orme)	2	0	3	1	1	0	0	X	7
Yukon (Miller)	0	1	0	0	0	0	1	X	2

Sheet E	1	2	3	4	5	6	7	8	Final
Northern Ontario (Hunt)	0	1	0	0	2	0	0	X	3
Alberta (Sherrard)	1	0	2	1	0	0	3	X	7

Sheet F	1	2	3	4	5	6	7	8	Final
Nunavut (Van Strien)	1	0	0	0	0	2	0	X	3
Manitoba (Anderson)	0	2	1	2	3	0	2	X	10

=== Championship round ===
==== A Bracket ====
Qualifier 1
A1	Alberta	8
B4	Quebec	4
A1	Alberta	7
B3	Manitoba	3
A2	Ontario	3
B3	Manitoba	7

Qualifier 2
B1	Saskatchewan	10
A4	New Brunswick	6
B1	Saskatchewan	8
B2	British Columbia	4
B2	British Columbia	11
A3	Nova Scotia	8

==== B Bracket ====
			Qualifier 3
			B3	Manitoba	4
A4	New Brunswick	4	A3	Nova Scotia	5
A3	Nova Scotia	9

			Qualifier 4
			B2	British Columbia	3
B4	Quebec	6	B4	Quebec	11
A2	Ontario	5

==== A Event ====
===== Semifinals =====
Thursday, November 23, 4:00 pm

Sheet A	1	2	3	4	5	6	7	8	Final
Alberta (Sherrard)	2	0	2	0	4	0	0	X	8
Quebec (Maheux)	0	1	0	1	0	1	1	X	4

Sheet B	1	2	3	4	5	6	7	8	Final
Ontario (Herron)	0	1	0	2	0	0	0	0	3
Manitoba (Anderson)	2	0	1	0	0	1	0	3	7

Sheet D	1	2	3	4	5	6	7	8	Final
British Columbia (Orme)	1	0	3	0	2	0	2	3	11
Nova Scotia (Steele)	0	3	0	2	0	3	0	0	8

Sheet E	1	2	3	4	5	6	7	8	Final
Saskatchewan (Criton)	4	1	0	4	0	1	0	X	10
New Brunswick (Crouse)	0	0	2	0	2	0	2	X	6

===== Finals =====
Friday, November 24, 10:00 am

Sheet B	1	2	3	4	5	6	7	8	Final
Saskatchewan (Criton)	3	0	3	1	0	1	0	X	8
British Columbia (Orme)	0	1	0	0	2	0	1	X	4

Sheet D	1	2	3	4	5	6	7	8	Final
Alberta (Sherrard)	0	0	3	0	1	0	3	X	7
Manitoba (Anderson)	1	1	0	0	0	1	0	X	3

==== B Event ====
===== Semifinals =====
Friday, November 24, 10:00 am

Sheet A	1	2	3	4	5	6	7	8	Final
New Brunswick (Crouse)	0	3	0	0	1	0	0	X	4
Nova Scotia (Steele)	1	0	1	1	0	5	1	X	9

Sheet E	1	2	3	4	5	6	7	8	9	Final
Quebec (Maheux)	3	0	1	0	0	0	0	1	1	6
Ontario (Herron)	0	1	0	2	0	1	1	0	0	5

===== Finals =====
Friday, November 24, 7:30 pm

Sheet B	1	2	3	4	5	6	7	8	Final
Manitoba (Anderson)	0	0	0	1	0	1	0	2	4
Nova Scotia (Steele)	0	2	1	0	1	0	1	0	5

Sheet D	1	2	3	4	5	6	7	8	Final
British Columbia (Orme)	0	0	1	2	0	0	X	X	3
Quebec (Maheux)	2	2	0	0	3	4	X	X	11

=== Playoffs ===
Semifinals
1	Alberta	8
4	Quebec	7
2	Saskatchewan	5
3	Nova Scotia	3

Gold medal game
1	Alberta	7
2	Saskatchewan	2
Bronze medal game
4	Quebec	7
3	Nova Scotia	5

==== Semifinals ====
Saturday, November 25, 10:00 am

Sheet B	1	2	3	4	5	6	7	8	Final
Alberta (Sherrard)	2	1	0	2	0	2	0	1	8
Quebec (Maheux)	0	0	2	0	2	0	3	0	7

Sheet D	1	2	3	4	5	6	7	8	Final
Saskatchewan (Criton)	2	0	1	0	0	0	0	2	5
Nova Scotia (Steele)	0	1	0	1	0	1	0	0	3

==== Bronze medal game ====
Saturday, November 25, 2:30 pm

Sheet D	1	2	3	4	5	6	7	8	Final
Quebec (Maheux)	0	2	0	0	1	0	2	2	7
Nova Scotia (Steele)	1	0	1	1	0	2	0	0	5

==== Gold medal game ====
Saturday, November 25, 2:30 pm

Sheet A	1	2	3	4	5	6	7	8	Final
Alberta (Sherrard)	2	1	0	0	3	0	1	X	7
Saskatchewan (Criton)	0	0	0	2	0	0	0	X	2

== Women ==
=== Teams ===
The teams are listed as follows:

Team	Skip	Third	Second	Lead	Alternate	Club
Alberta	Nanette Dupont	Samantha Davies	Kendra Nakagama	Avice Dekelver	Bridget Mearns	Lethbridge CC, Lethbridge
British Columbia	Carley Sandwith-Craig (Fourth)	Marika Van Osch	Roselyn Craig (Skip)	Megan Montgomery	Barb Foster	Duncan CC, Duncan
Manitoba	Kara Balshaw	Heather Carson	Sandra Carson	Cathy Gingera	Kim Merasty	Thistle CC/Fort Rouge CC, Winnipeg
New Brunswick	Abby Burgess	Brooke Tracy	Samantha Crook	Hannah Williams		Gage G&CC, Oromocto
Newfoundland and Labrador	Jennifer Taylor	Jennifer Gallagher	Andrea Heffernan	Michelle Taylor		St. John's CC, St. John's
Northern Ontario	Robyn Despins	Samantha Morris	Corie Adamson	Rebecca Carr	Jessie Amadeo	Fort William CC, Thunder Bay
Northwest Territories	Deb Stanley	Carmella Oscienny	Kandis Jameson	Marilyn Taylor	Candi Carleton	Hay River CC, Hay River
Nova Scotia	Tanya Phillips	Heather Whiteway	Angela Pettipas	Christine Keddy		CFB Halifax CC, Halifax
Nunavut	Denise Hutchings	Leigh Gustafson	Alison Taylor	Meridith Penner		Iqaluit CC, Iqaluit
Ontario	Lindsay Thorne	Melissa Gannon	Emily Kelly	Mychelle Zahab		Rideau CC, Ottawa
Prince Edward Island	Julie Mutch	Heather Drake	Stephanie Grills	Alice Rice		Montague CC, Montague
Quebec	Cindy Dallaire	Karine Lachance	Nadia Tremblay	Christine Beaulieu	Joannie Riverin	CC Sept-Îles, Sept-Îles
Saskatchewan	Allison McMillan	Amanda Jacobson	Tara Sander	Danika Greschuk		Nutana CC, Saskatoon
Yukon	Darlene Gammel	Tamar Vandenberghe	Laura Wilson	Frances Taylor		Whitehorse CC, Whitehorse

=== Round-robin standings ===
Final Round Robin Standings

Key
Teams to Championship Round

Pool A	Skip	W	L
British Columbia	Roselyn Craig	6	0
New Brunswick	Abby Burgess	4	2
Quebec	Cindy Dallaire	4	2
Nova Scotia	Tanya Phillips	3	3
Northern Ontario	Robyn Despins	3	3
Yukon	Darlene Gammel	1	5
Northwest Territories	Deb Stanley	0	6

Pool B	Skip	W	L
Ontario	Lindsay Thorne	5	1
Alberta	Nanette Dupont	5	1
Saskatchewan	Allison McMillan	4	2
Manitoba	Kara Balshaw	3	3
Newfoundland and Labrador	Jennifer Taylor	2	4
Nunavut	Denise Hutchings	1	5
Prince Edward Island	Julie Mutch	1	5

=== Round-robin results ===
All draws are listed in Central Time (UTC−06:00).

==== Draw 1 ====
Sunday, November 19, 6:00 pm

Sheet B	1	2	3	4	5	6	7	8	Final
Newfoundland and Labrador (Taylor)	1	0	0	0	1	0	0	X	2
Manitoba (Balshaw)	0	3	0	1	0	1	2	X	7

Sheet C	1	2	3	4	5	6	7	8	Final
Prince Edward Island (Mutch)	0	0	0	0	2	0	X	X	2
Ontario (Thorne)	3	4	4	3	0	1	X	X	15

Sheet E	1	2	3	4	5	6	7	8	Final
Saskatchewan (McMillan)	4	1	3	5	1	0	X	X	14
Nunavut (Hutchings)	0	0	0	0	0	1	X	X	1

==== Draw 2 ====
Monday, November 20, 12:00 pm

Sheet A	1	2	3	4	5	6	7	8	Final
Yukon (Gammel)	1	0	0	0	0	1	X	X	2
Nova Scotia (Phillips)	0	4	1	1	4	0	X	X	10

Sheet D	1	2	3	4	5	6	7	8	Final
British Columbia (Craig)	1	2	0	4	0	0	0	1	8
Quebec (Dallaire)	0	0	1	0	1	3	1	0	6

Sheet F	1	2	3	4	5	6	7	8	Final
Northwest Territories (Stanley)	0	1	1	0	0	0	1	X	3
Northern Ontario (Despins)	2	0	0	3	1	2	0	X	8

==== Draw 3 ====
Monday, November 20, 4:00 pm

Sheet B	1	2	3	4	5	6	7	8	Final
Ontario (Thorne)	0	3	0	2	3	0	4	X	12
Nunavut (Hutchings)	1	0	1	0	0	1	0	X	3

Sheet C	1	2	3	4	5	6	7	8	Final
Newfoundland and Labrador (Taylor)	3	0	1	0	0	1	0	0	5
Alberta (Dupont)	0	1	0	1	1	0	3	2	8

Sheet E	1	2	3	4	5	6	7	8	9	Final
Manitoba (Balshaw)	0	0	0	2	0	2	2	1	0	7
Prince Edward Island (Mutch)	0	0	2	0	5	0	0	0	2	9

==== Draw 4 ====
Monday, November 20, 8:30 pm

Sheet A	1	2	3	4	5	6	7	8	Final
New Brunswick (Burgess)	3	0	6	0	2	2	X	X	13
Northwest Territories (Stanley)	0	1	0	1	0	0	X	X	2

Sheet D	1	2	3	4	5	6	7	8	Final
Nova Scotia (Phillips)	0	2	1	2	0	0	0	0	5
Northern Ontario (Despins)	1	0	0	0	1	1	1	0	4

Sheet F	1	2	3	4	5	6	7	8	Final
Quebec (Dallaire)	3	3	0	2	2	0	X	X	10
Yukon (Gammel)	0	0	2	0	0	1	X	X	3

==== Draw 5 ====
Tuesday, November 21, 9:00 am

Sheet A	1	2	3	4	5	6	7	8	Final
Nunavut (Hutchings)	0	0	0	0	0	3	X	X	3
Newfoundland and Labrador (Taylor)	2	3	4	1	2	0	X	X	12

Sheet D	1	2	3	4	5	6	7	8	Final
Alberta (Dupont)	1	0	2	1	1	0	1	0	6
Manitoba (Balshaw)	0	2	0	0	0	1	0	1	4

Sheet F	1	2	3	4	5	6	7	8	Final
Saskatchewan (McMillan)	0	1	1	2	0	1	2	X	7
Ontario (Thorne)	2	0	0	0	1	0	0	X	3

==== Draw 6 ====
Tuesday, November 21, 12:30 pm

Sheet B	1	2	3	4	5	6	7	8	Final
Yukon (Gammel)	4	2	3	0	1	2	X	X	12
Northwest Territories (Stanley)	0	0	0	1	0	0	X	X	1

Sheet C	1	2	3	4	5	6	7	8	Final
British Columbia (Craig)	2	1	0	0	2	2	1	X	8
Nova Scotia (Phillips)	0	0	2	2	0	0	0	X	4

Sheet E	1	2	3	4	5	6	7	8	Final
Quebec (Dallaire)	0	0	0	2	0	3	0	X	5
New Brunswick (Burgess)	2	3	3	0	2	0	1	X	11

==== Draw 7 ====
Tuesday, November 21, 4:00 pm

Sheet A	1	2	3	4	5	6	7	8	Final
Prince Edward Island (Mutch)	0	1	0	2	0	0	0	1	4
Saskatchewan (McMillan)	1	0	3	0	0	1	1	0	6

Sheet D	1	2	3	4	5	6	7	8	Final
Newfoundland and Labrador (Taylor)	0	0	1	0	0	1	0	X	2
Ontario (Thorne)	1	1	0	1	2	0	3	X	8

Sheet F	1	2	3	4	5	6	7	8	Final
Alberta (Dupont)	0	0	4	0	4	1	X	X	9
Nunavut (Hutchings)	0	1	0	1	0	0	X	X	2

==== Draw 8 ====
Tuesday, November 21, 7:30 pm

Sheet B	1	2	3	4	5	6	7	8	Final
Northern Ontario (Despins)	0	0	0	2	0	2	0	2	6
New Brunswick (Burgess)	0	0	1	0	1	0	2	0	4

Sheet C	1	2	3	4	5	6	7	8	Final
Northwest Territories (Stanley)	0	0	0	0	0	0	X	X	0
Quebec (Dallaire)	2	2	1	1	3	2	X	X	11

Sheet E	1	2	3	4	5	6	7	8	Final
Yukon (Gammel)	0	0	2	0	1	0	0	X	3
British Columbia (Craig)	2	2	0	3	0	2	4	X	13

==== Draw 10 ====
Wednesday, November 22, 12:30 pm

Sheet A	1	2	3	4	5	6	7	8	Final
Ontario (Thorne)	2	0	1	2	1	0	0	0	6
Manitoba (Balshaw)	0	1	0	0	0	1	1	0	3

Sheet B	1	2	3	4	5	6	7	8	Final
Alberta (Dupont)	2	0	2	0	1	3	1	X	9
Saskatchewan (McMillan)	0	2	0	1	0	0	0	X	3

Sheet C	1	2	3	4	5	6	7	8	Final
Yukon (Gammel)	1	0	1	0	1	0	0	X	3
Northern Ontario (Despins)	0	1	0	1	0	5	3	X	10

Sheet D	1	2	3	4	5	6	7	8	Final
Prince Edward Island (Mutch)	0	1	0	0	3	1	0	0	5
Nunavut (Hutchings)	0	0	2	1	0	0	1	3	7

Sheet E	1	2	3	4	5	6	7	8	Final
Nova Scotia (Phillips)	3	0	0	4	0	3	2	X	12
Northwest Territories (Stanley)	0	1	1	0	2	0	0	X	4

Sheet F	1	2	3	4	5	6	7	8	9	Final
New Brunswick (Burgess)	0	0	2	0	2	2	0	1	0	7
British Columbia (Craig)	2	1	0	3	0	0	1	0	1	8

==== Draw 12 ====
Wednesday, November 22, 7:30 pm

Sheet A	1	2	3	4	5	6	7	8	Final
Northern Ontario (Despins)	2	0	2	1	1	0	0	0	6
British Columbia (Craig)	0	1	0	0	0	1	3	3	8

Sheet B	1	2	3	4	5	6	7	8	Final
Quebec (Dallaire)	0	3	0	0	2	0	0	1	6
Nova Scotia (Phillips)	1	0	0	1	0	2	1	0	5

Sheet C	1	2	3	4	5	6	7	8	Final
Manitoba (Balshaw)	0	1	3	2	0	2	0	X	8
Saskatchewan (McMillan)	1	0	0	0	3	0	1	X	5

Sheet D	1	2	3	4	5	6	7	8	Final
New Brunswick (Burgess)	0	7	1	3	0	1	X	X	12
Yukon (Gammel)	1	0	0	0	1	0	X	X	2

Sheet E	1	2	3	4	5	6	7	8	Final
Ontario (Thorne)	1	0	1	0	1	0	1	1	5
Alberta (Dupont)	0	2	0	1	0	1	0	0	4

Sheet F	1	2	3	4	5	6	7	8	Final
Newfoundland and Labrador (Taylor)	2	0	0	0	3	0	0	5	10
Prince Edward Island (Mutch)	0	0	0	1	0	2	2	0	5

==== Draw 14 ====
Thursday, November 23, 12:30 pm

Sheet A	1	2	3	4	5	6	7	8	Final
Alberta (Dupont)	0	1	2	1	0	0	1	1	6
Prince Edward Island (Mutch)	0	0	0	0	1	2	0	0	3

Sheet B	1	2	3	4	5	6	7	8	Final
British Columbia (Craig)	3	0	2	2	0	3	X	X	10
Northwest Territories (Stanley)	0	1	0	0	2	0	X	X	3

Sheet C	1	2	3	4	5	6	7	8	Final
Nova Scotia (Phillips)	0	2	0	1	0	0	0	X	3
New Brunswick (Burgess)	2	0	2	0	1	1	3	X	9

Sheet D	1	2	3	4	5	6	7	8	Final
Saskatchewan (McMillan)	3	0	1	0	0	0	0	2	6
Newfoundland and Labrador (Taylor)	0	2	0	0	1	0	1	0	4

Sheet E	1	2	3	4	5	6	7	8	Final
Quebec (Dallaire)	1	1	0	2	0	1	1	1	7
Northern Ontario (Despins)	0	0	2	0	2	0	0	0	4

Sheet F	1	2	3	4	5	6	7	8	Final
Nunavut (Hutchings)	0	0	0	2	1	0	X	X	3
Manitoba (Balshaw)	5	1	2	0	0	3	X	X	11

=== Championship round ===
==== A Bracket ====
Qualifier 1
A1	British Columbia	1
B4	Manitoba	9
B4	Manitoba	2
A2	New Brunswick	6
A2	New Brunswick	6
B3	Saskatchewan	5

Qualifier 2
B1	Ontario	5
A4	Nova Scotia	3
B1	Ontario	6
A3	Quebec	3
B2	Alberta	1
A3	Quebec	8

==== B Bracket ====
			Qualifier 3
			A3	Quebec	5
A1	British Columbia	7	A1	British Columbia	6
B3	Saskatchewan	5

			Qualifier 4
			B4	Manitoba	4
A4	Nova Scotia	7	A4	Nova Scotia	6
B2	Alberta	3

==== A Event ====
===== Semifinals =====
Thursday, November 23, 7:30 pm

Sheet A	1	2	3	4	5	6	7	8	Final
British Columbia (Craig)	0	0	1	0	0	0	X	X	1
Manitoba (Balshaw)	2	4	0	1	1	1	X	X	9

Sheet B	1	2	3	4	5	6	7	8	Final
New Brunswick (Burgess)	0	4	0	0	1	0	0	1	6
Saskatchewan (McMillan)	1	0	1	1	0	2	0	0	5

Sheet D	1	2	3	4	5	6	7	8	Final
Alberta (Dupont)	0	1	0	0	0	0	X	X	1
Quebec (Dallaire)	1	0	2	2	2	1	X	X	8

Sheet E	1	2	3	4	5	6	7	8	Final
Ontario (Thorne)	0	2	0	1	2	0	0	X	5
Nova Scotia (Phillips)	1	0	0	0	0	1	1	X	3

===== Finals =====
Friday, November 24, 1:30 pm

Sheet B	1	2	3	4	5	6	7	8	Final
Ontario (Thorne)	2	3	0	0	1	0	0	X	6
Quebec (Dallaire)	0	0	1	0	0	1	1	X	3

Sheet D	1	2	3	4	5	6	7	8	Final
Manitoba (Balshaw)	0	1	0	0	1	0	0	0	2
New Brunswick (Burgess)	0	0	0	2	0	1	0	3	6

==== B Event ====
===== Semifinals =====
Friday, November 24, 1:30 pm

Sheet A	1	2	3	4	5	6	7	8	Final
Nova Scotia (Phillips)	0	2	2	1	2	0	0	X	7
Alberta (Dupont)	0	0	0	0	0	2	1	X	3

Sheet E	1	2	3	4	5	6	7	8	Final
British Columbia (Craig)	0	1	0	1	2	1	2	X	7
Saskatchewan (McMillan)	3	0	2	0	0	0	0	X	5

===== Finals =====
Friday, November 24, 7:30 pm

Sheet A	1	2	3	4	5	6	7	8	Final
Quebec (Dallaire)	2	0	1	0	1	0	1	0	5
British Columbia (Craig)	0	1	0	2	0	2	0	1	6

Sheet E	1	2	3	4	5	6	7	8	Final
Manitoba (Balshaw)	0	0	1	0	1	0	2	X	4
Nova Scotia (Phillips)	1	0	0	2	0	3	0	X	6

=== Playoffs ===
Semifinals
1	New Brunswick	8
4	Nova Scotia	4
2	Ontario	9
3	British Columbia	3

Gold medal game
1	New Brunswick	8
2	Ontario	7
Bronze medal game
4	Nova Scotia	3
3	British Columbia	9

==== Semifinals ====
Saturday, November 25, 10:00 am

Sheet A	1	2	3	4	5	6	7	8	Final
Ontario (Thorne)	0	1	1	0	2	0	2	3	9
British Columbia (Craig)	0	0	0	2	0	1	0	0	3

Sheet D	1	2	3	4	5	6	7	8	Final
New Brunswick (Burgess)	0	3	0	0	3	0	2	X	8
Nova Scotia (Phillips)	0	0	2	1	0	1	0	X	4

==== Bronze medal game ====
Saturday, November 25, 2:30 pm

Sheet E	1	2	3	4	5	6	7	8	Final
Nova Scotia (Phillips)	1	0	1	0	1	0	0	X	3
British Columbia (Craig)	0	4	0	1	0	3	1	X	9

==== Gold medal game ====
Saturday, November 25, 2:30 pm

Sheet B	1	2	3	4	5	6	7	8	Final
New Brunswick (Burgess)	0	2	0	3	0	2	0	1	8
Ontario (Thorne)	1	0	2	0	2	0	2	0	7
