= 1986 World Women's Curling Championship =

- Host city: Kelowna, British Columbia, Canada
- Arena: Kelowna Memorial Arena
- Dates: March 23–29
- Winner: Canada
- Curling club: St. Catharines CC, St. Catharines
- Skip: Marilyn Darte
- Third: Kathy McEdwards
- Second: Christine Jurgenson
- Lead: Jan Augustyn
- Coach: Lynn Reynolds
- Finalist: West Germany (Andrea Schöpp)

The 1986 World Women's Curling Championship, the women's world curling championship, was held from March 23–29 at the Kelowna Memorial Arena in Kelowna, British Columbia, Canada.

Canada, skipped by Marilyn Darte (also known as Marilyn Bodogh-Darte at the time) won the gold medal, easily defeating West Germany, skipped by Andrea Schöpp in the final, 12–5. It was the third consecutive world championship for Canada. The Darte rink won the game thanks to steals of two in the third, four in the sixth and a single in the seventh. Canada took a 2–1 lead after Darte drew to the button in second end to score two. They then stole three in the next end after Schöpp was heavy on a draw. The teams then traded singles in the fourth and fifth The steal of four in the sixth came as a result of a missed wick attempt by Schöpp, when she ended up just brushing off a Canadian stone, and rolling out of the rings, to go down 2–9. Schöpp conceded the game after nine ends. It was the first time West Germany had made the final in the women's championship. The teams played in front of about 2,000 spectators.

== Teams ==
Canada	Denmark	France	West Germany	Netherlands
St. Catharines CC, St. Catharines Skip: Marilyn Darte; Third: Kathy McEdwards; Second: Christine Jurgenson; Lead: Jan Augustyn	Hvidovre CC, Hvidovre Skip: Helena Blach; Third: Jette Olsen; Second: Malene Krause; Lead: Lone Kristoffersen	Mont d'Arbois CC, Megève Fourth: Huguette Jullien; Skip: Paulette Sulpice; Second: Isabelle Quere; Lead: Jocelyn Lhenry	SC Riessersee, Garmisch-Partenkirchen Skip: Andrea Schöpp; Third: Monika Wagner; Second: Stephanie Mayr; Lead: Elinore Schöpp	Den Haag CC, The Hague Skip: Laura van Imhoff; Third: Elisabeth Veening; Second: Jenny Bovenschen; Lead: Marjorie Querido
Norway	Scotland	Sweden	Switzerland	United States
Snarøen CC, Oslo Skip: Anne Jøtun Bakke; Third: Hilde Jøtun; Second: Trine Trulsen; Lead: Billie Skjerpen	Hamilton & Thornyhill CC, Hamilton Skip: Isobel Torrance Jr. Third: Margaret Craig; Second: Jackie Steele; Lead: Sheila Harvey	Norrköpings CK, Norrköping Fourth: Maud Nordlander; Skip: Inga Arfwidsson; Second: Ulrika Åkerberg; Lead: Barbro Arfwidsson	Bern Egghölzi Damen CC, Bern Skip: Erika Müller; Third: Irene Bürgi; Second: Barbara Meier; Lead: Cristina Lestander	St. Paul CC, St. Paul Skip: Geraldine Tilden; Third: Linda Barneson; Second: Barb Polski; Lead: Barb Gutzmer

== Round-robin standings ==
Key
Teams to playoffs
Teams to tiebreaker

Country	Skip	W	L
Canada	Marilyn Darte	8	1
Scotland	Isobel Torrance Jr.	7	2
West Germany	Andrea Schöpp	7	2
Norway	Anne Jøtun Bakke	6	3
Sweden	Inga Arfwidsson	6	3
Switzerland	Erika Müller	4	5
United States	Geraldine Tilden	3	6
France	Paulette Sulpice	2	7
Denmark	Helena Blach	2	7
Netherlands	Laura van Imhoff	0	9

== Round-robin results ==
=== Draw 1 ===
Team	1	2	3	4	5	6	7	8	9	10	Final
Canada (Darte)	0	4	3	0	1	0	3	0	X	X	11
Netherlands (van Imhoff)	1	0	0	1	0	1	0	1	X	X	4

Team	1	2	3	4	5	6	7	8	9	10	Final
Norway (Jøtun Bakke)	3	1	0	1	1	0	2	0	0	X	8
France (Sulpice)	0	0	2	0	0	2	0	2	1	X	7

Team	1	2	3	4	5	6	7	8	9	10	11	Final
United States (Tilden)	1	1	0	1	1	1	0	0	0	1	0	6
West Germany (Schöpp)	0	0	2	0	0	0	2	2	0	0	1	7

Team	1	2	3	4	5	6	7	8	9	10	Final
Denmark (Blach)	0	0	1	0	2	1	2	0	1	0	7
Switzerland (Müller)	1	3	0	1	0	0	0	1	0	3	9

Team	1	2	3	4	5	6	7	8	9	10	Final
Sweden (Arfwidsson)	3	0	1	0	1	1	0	1	2	X	9
Scotland (Torrance)	0	2	0	2	0	0	1	0	0	X	5

=== Draw 2 ===
Team	1	2	3	4	5	6	7	8	9	10	Final
Scotland (Torrance)	5	0	1	3	0	0	2	0	1	X	12
Norway (Jøtun Bakke)	0	2	0	0	2	3	0	2	0	X	9

Team	1	2	3	4	5	6	7	8	9	10	Final
West Germany (Schöpp)	1	0	1	4	0	2	0	0	0	X	8
Sweden (Arfwidsson)	0	1	0	0	2	0	1	1	2	X	7

Team	1	2	3	4	5	6	7	8	9	10	Final
Switzerland (Müller)	0	0	0	1	0	1	0	1	0	X	3
Canada (Darte)	1	0	1	0	2	0	2	0	3	X	9

Team	1	2	3	4	5	6	7	8	9	10	Final
Netherlands (van Imhoff)	0	0	1	0	0	1	0	1	X	X	3
United States (Tilden)	4	1	0	3	3	0	1	0	X	X	12

Team	1	2	3	4	5	6	7	8	9	10	11	Final
Denmark (Blach)	0	0	1	0	1	0	2	0	1	1	0	6
France (Sulpice)	2	1	0	1	0	1	0	1	0	0	2	8

=== Draw 3 ===
Team	1	2	3	4	5	6	7	8	9	10	Final
Sweden (Arfwidsson)	0	2	1	1	1	1	0	X	X	X	6
Denmark (Blach)	0	0	0	0	0	0	1	X	X	X	1

Team	1	2	3	4	5	6	7	8	9	10	Final
Switzerland (Müller)	1	0	1	1	2	1	0	0	3	X	9
Netherlands (van Imhoff)	0	1	0	0	0	0	2	3	0	X	6

Team	1	2	3	4	5	6	7	8	9	10	Final
France (Sulpice)	0	2	0	2	0	0	1	0	1	2	8
Scotland (Torrance)	1	0	2	0	0	3	0	3	0	0	9

Team	1	2	3	4	5	6	7	8	9	10	Final
Canada (Darte)	0	2	1	0	0	2	0	3	0	2	10
West Germany (Schöpp)	3	0	0	1	1	0	1	0	1	0	7

Team	1	2	3	4	5	6	7	8	9	10	Final
Norway (Jøtun Bakke)	0	2	2	0	1	2	0	0	0	0	7
United States (Tilden)	2	0	0	1	0	0	4	1	1	1	10

=== Draw 4 ===
Team	1	2	3	4	5	6	7	8	9	10	Final
Netherlands (van Imhoff)	1	0	1	0	0	1	0	0	1	X	4
France (Sulpice)	0	1	0	1	2	0	1	1	0	X	6

Team	1	2	3	4	5	6	7	8	9	10	Final
United States (Tilden)	0	2	2	0	0	1	1	0	0	X	6
Canada (Darte)	2	0	0	1	4	0	0	3	3	X	13

Team	1	2	3	4	5	6	7	8	9	10	Final
Sweden (Arfwidsson)	1	0	1	0	0	0	0	X	X	X	2
Norway (Jøtun Bakke)	0	4	0	2	3	1	1	X	X	X	11

Team	1	2	3	4	5	6	7	8	9	10	Final
Scotland (Torrance)	0	0	1	0	2	0	3	0	2	1	9
Denmark (Blach)	1	1	0	2	0	2	0	1	0	0	7

Team	1	2	3	4	5	6	7	8	9	10	Final
West Germany (Schöpp)	3	0	1	0	0	1	1	1	0	X	7
Switzerland (Müller)	0	1	0	0	2	0	0	0	1	X	4

=== Draw 5 ===
Team	1	2	3	4	5	6	7	8	9	10	11	Final
Scotland (Torrance)	1	0	3	0	0	2	0	2	0	0	2	10
United States (Tilden)	0	2	0	1	1	0	1	0	3	0	0	8

Team	1	2	3	4	5	6	7	8	9	10	11	Final
France (Sulpice)	0	1	1	0	0	1	1	1	0	2	0	7
West Germany (Schöpp)	2	0	0	1	1	0	0	0	3	0	1	8

Team	1	2	3	4	5	6	7	8	9	10	Final
Denmark (Blach)	4	1	0	4	0	0	4	X	X	X	13
Netherlands (van Imhoff)	0	0	1	0	1	2	0	X	X	X	4

Team	1	2	3	4	5	6	7	8	9	10	Final
Norway (Jøtun Bakke)	3	0	1	1	0	1	0	1	0	1	8
Switzerland (Müller)	0	2	0	0	1	0	3	0	1	0	7

Team	1	2	3	4	5	6	7	8	9	10	Final
Canada (Darte)	0	2	1	0	1	0	2	0	6	X	12
Sweden (Arfwidsson)	1	0	0	2	0	1	0	1	0	X	5

=== Draw 6 ===
Team	1	2	3	4	5	6	7	8	9	10	Final
Switzerland (Müller)	0	2	0	1	0	0	0	2	0	X	5
Sweden (Arfwidsson)	2	0	2	0	1	1	2	0	1	X	9

Team	1	2	3	4	5	6	7	8	9	10	Final
Denmark (Blach)	0	1	0	0	0	1	0	X	X	X	2
Canada (Darte)	2	0	1	1	3	0	2	X	X	X	9

Team	1	2	3	4	5	6	7	8	9	10	Final
West Germany (Schöpp)	0	0	1	1	1	1	0	0	2	X	6
Norway (Jøtun Bakke)	1	1	0	0	0	0	0	2	0	X	4

Team	1	2	3	4	5	6	7	8	9	10	Final
United States (Tilden)	0	3	1	0	2	3	3	X	X	X	12
France (Sulpice)	2	0	0	1	0	0	0	X	X	X	3

Team	1	2	3	4	5	6	7	8	9	10	Final
Netherlands (van Imhoff)	0	1	0	1	0	1	0	1	0	X	4
Scotland (Torrance)	3	0	1	0	2	0	2	0	2	X	10

=== Draw 7 ===
Team	1	2	3	4	5	6	7	8	9	10	Final
Norway (Jøtun Bakke)	1	0	2	0	3	2	0	1	0	X	9
Canada (Darte)	0	1	0	1	0	0	1	0	1	X	4

Team	1	2	3	4	5	6	7	8	9	10	Final
Sweden (Arfwidsson)	0	2	0	2	4	0	3	1	X	X	12
Netherlands (van Imhoff)	2	0	1	0	0	3	0	0	X	X	6

Team	1	2	3	4	5	6	7	8	9	10	Final
France (Sulpice)	0	2	0	0	0	0	1	1	1	0	5
Switzerland (Müller)	4	0	1	1	1	2	0	0	0	1	10

Team	1	2	3	4	5	6	7	8	9	10	Final
Scotland (Torrance)	1	2	3	1	0	1	1	0	X	X	9
West Germany (Schöpp)	0	0	0	0	2	0	0	1	X	X	3

Team	1	2	3	4	5	6	7	8	9	10	Final
United States (Tilden)	2	1	0	0	1	0	1	0	0	0	5
Denmark (Blach)	0	0	1	1	0	1	0	0	1	2	6

=== Draw 8 ===
Team	1	2	3	4	5	6	7	8	9	10	Final
West Germany (Schöpp)	0	1	1	0	1	1	0	2	0	1	7
Denmark (Blach)	0	0	0	1	0	0	2	0	3	0	6

Team	1	2	3	4	5	6	7	8	9	10	Final
Switzerland (Müller)	0	2	0	0	0	0	1	0	X	X	3
Scotland (Torrance)	1	0	2	1	1	2	0	2	X	X	9

Team	1	2	3	4	5	6	7	8	9	10	Final
Sweden (Arfwidsson)	1	1	1	0	4	0	2	1	0	X	10
United States (Tilden)	0	0	0	2	0	2	0	0	1	X	5

Team	1	2	3	4	5	6	7	8	9	10	Final
Netherlands (van Imhoff)	0	0	2	1	0	1	0	X	X	X	4
Norway (Jøtun Bakke)	0	0	2	1	0	1	0	X	X	X	13

Team	1	2	3	4	5	6	7	8	9	10	Final
Canada (Darte)	0	4	0	2	0	1	0	2	0	2	11
France (Sulpice)	1	0	1	0	4	0	2	0	2	0	10

=== Draw 9 ===
Team	1	2	3	4	5	6	7	8	9	10	11	Final
Switzerland (Müller)	1	0	1	1	0	2	0	1	0	0	2	8
United States (Tilden)	0	1	0	0	1	0	2	0	1	1	0	6

Team	1	2	3	4	5	6	7	8	9	10	Final
Denmark (Blach)	2	1	0	1	0	0	1	0	0	X	5
Norway (Jøtun Bakke)	0	0	2	0	1	2	0	2	3	X	10

Team	1	2	3	4	5	6	7	8	9	10	Final
Scotland (Torrance)	0	0	1	0	1	0	0	0	1	X	3
Canada (Darte)	2	1	0	1	0	1	1	1	0	X	7

Team	1	2	3	4	5	6	7	8	9	10	11	Final
France (Sulpice)	1	1	0	2	0	0	0	0	3	1	0	8
Sweden (Arfwidsson)	0	0	2	0	2	1	1	2	0	0	2	10

Team	1	2	3	4	5	6	7	8	9	10	Final
Netherlands (van Imhoff)	1	0	0	0	1	0	1	X	X	X	3
West Germany (Schöpp)	0	4	3	1	0	1	0	X	X	X	9

== Tiebreakers ==
Team	1	2	3	4	5	6	7	8	9	10	Final
Denmark (Blach)	1	0	0	3	2	0	1	3	0	X	10
France (Sulpice)	0	3	1	0	0	2	0	0	2	X	8

Team	1	2	3	4	5	6	7	8	9	10	11	Final
Sweden (Arfwidsson)	0	0	1	0	0	2	0	2	0	2	2	9
Norway (Jøtun Bakke)	2	1	0	1	1	0	1	0	1	0	0	7

== Playoffs ==
Semifinals
1	Canada	8
4	Sweden	7
2	Scotland	3
3	West Germany	7

Final
1	Canada	12
3	West Germany	5
Bronze Medal Game
4	Sweden	10
2	Scotland	9

=== Semifinals ===
Team	1	2	3	4	5	6	7	8	9	10	Final
Canada (Darte)	1	2	0	0	0	0	3	1	0	1	8
Sweden (Arfwidsson)	0	0	2	1	2	1	0	0	1	0	7

Team	1	2	3	4	5	6	7	8	9	10	Final
Scotland (Torrance)	0	1	0	0	1	0	1	0	0	X	3
West Germany (Schöpp)	0	0	0	1	0	2	0	2	2	X	7

=== Bronze medal game ===
Team	1	2	3	4	5	6	7	8	9	10	Final
Sweden (Arfwidsson)	0	3	0	2	0	2	0	2	0	1	10
Scotland (Torrance)	1	0	1	0	3	0	3	0	1	0	9

=== Final ===
Team	1	2	3	4	5	6	7	8	9	10	Final
Canada (Darte)	0	2	2	0	1	4	0	2	1	X	12
West Germany (Schöpp)	1	0	0	1	0	0	3	0	0	X	5

1986 World Women's Curling Championship
(Canada)
Canada
4th title
