= Beaumont Curling Club =

- Location: 5303 50 St; Beaumont, Alberta, Canada

Information
- Established: 1960
- Club type: Dedicated Ice
- Curling Canada region: Yellowhead Zone, Curling Alberta
- Sheets of ice: 6
- Rock colours: Red and Yellow
- Website: curlbeaumont.ca

The Beaumont Curling Club is a curling club in Beaumont, Alberta. The club plays at the Ken Nichol Regional Recreation Centre.

== History ==
In 1958, local residents of Beaumont, Alberta began a curling league which played in nearby Leduc over the 1959–60 season. The idea for a club was spearheaded by the parish priest, Father Lucien Robert, the only one in the group who had curled before. The club had its first meeting in 1960, and was later incorporated with a capital stock of $30,000. The first facility would be played on natural ice.

In 2003, the club was granted a reprieve from a local smoke-free by-law because it had a liquor licence, allowing it an extra 18 months to comply.

Following the COVID-19 pandemic in Alberta, the club saw its membership drop 30 per cent. The club relied on local business support to cover operating costs due to lost revenue during the pandemic.

Over the 2023–24 curling season, the club played host to a number of Alberta Curling Series events, attracting some of the top ranked teams in the world.

== Provincial champions ==
=== Women's ===
Teams from the Beaumont Curling Club have won the Alberta Tournament of Hearts twice, earning the right to represent Alberta at the Tournament of Hearts, Canada's national women's championship.

| Year | Team | Hearts record |
|---|---|---|
| 1986 | Lil Werenka, Mabel Thompson, Karen Currey, Jean Slemko | 4–7 |
| 1988 | Lil Werenka, Simone Handfield, Beverly Karasek, Kathy Bacon | 4–7 |

=== Junior women's ===
Teams from the Beaumont Curling Club have won the provincial women's junior championships twice, earning the right to represent Alberta at the Canadian Junior Curling Championships.

| Year | Team | Canadian Juniors record |
|---|---|---|
| 1989 | Renee Handfield, Nicole Handfield, Joanne Goudeau, Renee Bussiere | 7–4 |
| 1990 | Renee Handfield, Nicole Handfield, Joanne Goudeau, Renee Bussiere | 4–6 |

=== Men's Curling Club championships ===
Dan Sherrard, Brandon Klassen, Shawn Donnelly and Kyle Reynolds won the men's provincial curling club championships in 2023. This earned the right to represent Alberta at the Canadian Curling Club Championships, which they won. The rink was without Donnelly at nationals, as he could not attend the event. The team went on to win the inaugural 2024 North American Curling Club Championships, defeating the U.S. team from the Fargo Moorhead Curling Club.

| Year | Team | Canadian Club Championships record |
|---|---|---|
| 2023 | Dan Sherrard, Brandon Klassen, Shawn Donnelly (Note: Did not play in nationals.), Kyle Reynolds | 10–0 |
