= Christine Jurgenson =

Canadian curler

Medal record

Curling

World Curling Championships
Gold medal – first place	1986 Kelowna	ON

World Senior championships
Gold medal – first place	2009 Dunedin	BC
Gold medal – first place	2011 St. Paul	BC
Gold medal – first place	2013 Federicton	AB

Tournament of Hearts
Gold medal – first place	1986 London	
Silver medal – second place	1983 Prince George	
Bronze medal – third place	1980 Edmonton	

Canadian Olympic Curling Trials
Bronze medal – third place	1997 Brandon	

Christine "Chris" Jurgenson (née Bodogh; born c. 1953) is a Canadian curler from British Columbia. She is a former World Champion, and was lead for the championship team at the World Senior Curling Championship in 2009 and skip for the 2011 World Senior Curling Championships . Jurgenson grew up in Ontario, where she played with her sister, Marilyn Bodogh. She won her first provincial title in 1980. She skipped Ontario to a 7–5 record at the 1980 Canadian Ladies Curling Association Championship.

In 1983, she played in Alberta, and made her second national championship, playing second for Cathy Shaw. At the 1983 Scott Tournament of Hearts, the team lost 5–4 to Nova Scotia, skipped by Penny LaRocque.

In 1986, she was back playing with her sister in Ontario, playing second for her. They would end up winning the 1986 Scott Tournament of Hearts, defeating the defending champion Linda Moore rink 7-4 in the final. They won the 1986 World Women's Curling Championship as Team Canada, defeating Germany's Andrea Schöpp 12–5 in the final.

The following season, the team represented Team Canada at the 1987 Scott Tournament of Hearts, finishing 4–7.

Jurgenson moved to British Columbia, and won her first B.C. provincial title there in 1995. At the 1995 Scott Tournament of Hearts, she played lead for Marla Geiger, and finished with a 6–5 record. She won her second B.C. provincial title, this time playing lead for Kelley Owen. The team finished with a 3–8 record, in last place. It would be her final trip to the Hearts.

Jurgenson won two provincial senior titles, in 2008 (playing lead for Pat Sanders) and again in 2010 as the skip. In both years, she won the Canadian Senior Curling Championships. Her 2008 and 2010 senior titles qualified her for the 2009 and 2011 World Senior Curling Championships. At the 2009 championship, the team won gold for Canada, defeating Switzerland's Renate Nedkoff 10-1. In 2011, Jurgenson skipped her team to another gold medal, defeating Sweden Ingrid Meldahl. 2013 World Senior Curling Championships alternate for Cathy King Team Alberta defeated Austria's Veronika Huber 13-1.

== Personal life ==
At the time of the 1986 World Championships, she worked for her father's lumber company in St. Catharines, Ontario.
