= Marilyn Bodogh =

Canadian curler (born 1955)

- Curler
- Other names: Marilyn Darte; Marilyn Bodogh-Darte
- Born: March 9, 1955 (age 71); Toronto, Ontario, Canada

Team
- Curling club: St. Catharines G&CC, St. Catharines, ON

Curling career
- Member Association: Ontario
- Hearts: 5 (1980, 1986, 1987, 1996, 1997)
- World Championship: 2 (1986, 1996)
Medal record
Women's curling
Representing Canada
World Curling Championships
| Gold medal – first place | 1986 Kelowna | Team |
| Gold medal – first place | 1996 Hamilton | Team |
Representing Ontario
Scott Tournament of Hearts
| Gold medal – first place | 1986 Kitchener | Team |
| Gold medal – first place | 1996 Thunder Bay | Team |
| Bronze medal – third place | 1980 Brandon | Team |

Marilyn C. Bodogh CM (also known as Marilyn Darte) (born March 9, 1955) is a Canadian curler, colour commentator and political candidate. Bodogh is best known for her two World Curling Championships in 1986 and 1996 and her two Tournament of Hearts championships to go with them.

== Biography ==
Born in Toronto, Ontario, she moved to St. Catharines with her family when she was nine years old. Her first job was working with her family's lumber company. At 22, she opened a flower shop. Through marriage, she would later become co-owner of the George Darte Funeral Home.

In 1980, Bodogh played third for her sister, Christine Bodogh, representing Ontario at the 1980 Canadian Ladies Curling Association Championship. In 1986, she returned to the tournament, this time known as the Scott Tournament of Hearts. Bodogh, now a skip, won the 1986 Hearts defeating the defending champion Linda Moore rink. Bodogh would go on to represent Canada at the 1986 World Championships where she beat Andrea Schöpp of Germany in the final. As defending champions, her team returned to the Hearts in 1987 but finished with a dismal record.

Bodogh made her comeback at the 1996 Scott Tournament of Hearts. She defeated Cheryl Kullman of Alberta in the final. At the World Championships, she defeated Lisa Schoeneberg of the United States in the final. She represented Team Canada (as defending champions) at the 1997 Hearts, but she finished 5-6. She would not return to the national championships again.

Since then she became a colour commentator on Rogers Sportsnet and Rogers TV in Ontario.

Bodogh mounted a campaign for mayor of St. Catharines, Ontario in the 2006 municipal election placing third in a race of eight candidates. Bodogh received 4,412 votes, 11.59% of the total ballots cast, considerably behind winning candidate Brian McMullan's 15,067 votes.

Bodogh is divorced and has two children.
