= 1985 Canadian Junior Women's Curling Championship =

The 1985 Pepsi-Cola Canadian Junior Women's Curling Championship was held March 9-16, 1985 at the Capital Winter Club in Fredericton, New Brunswick.

Team Saskatchewan, consisting of skip Kimberley Armbruster, third Sheila Calcutt, second Wanda Figgitt and lead Lorraine Krupski of Lemberg defeated British Columbia, skipped by Georgina Hawkes of Victoria in the final, 7–6 in an extra end. In the tenth end, Hawkes drew to the back-four on her last shot, but Armbruster hit the rock and stayed, to score one and force an extra end. In the eleventh end, Amrbruster drew to the back four around a guard on her first shot. Hawkes replied by taking out the guard, but Armbruster replaced it on her last. On her final shot, Hawkes wrecked on the guard, giving the championship to Armbruster.

== Teams ==
The teams were as follows:

Province / Territory	Skip	Third	Second	Lead	Locale
British Columbia	Georgina Hawkes	Christine Stevenson	Tracey Barwick	Deborah Massullo	Victoria
Alberta	Lindsey Graves	Sandy Symyrozum	Twyla Pruden	Colleen Burden	Edmonton
Saskatchewan	Kimberley Armbruster	Sheila Calcutt	Wanda Figgitt	Lorraine Krupski	Lemberg
Manitoba	Bonnie Hagborg	Deborah Elliot	Susanne Alexander	Kelly Bayliss	Winnipeg
Ontario	Susan Shepley	Jennifer Hampsey	Karen Gareau	Karen Shepley	Mississauga
Quebec	Ann Raby	Chantal Soucy	Debbie Jeror	Lisa Sweet	Buckingham
New Brunswick	Monique Masse	Esther Toner	Linda Desjardins	Susan Jane Toner	Grand Falls
Nova Scotia	Stephanie Jones	Beth Rankin	Dawne Rawding	Christina Falt	Halifax
Prince Edward Island	Tracey Hubley	Karolyn Godfrey	Tamara Hubley	Anne Partridge	Charlottetown
Newfoundland	Jill Noseworthy	Sonya White	Karen Anne Penney	Kathy O'Driscoll	St. John's
Northwest Territories/Yukon	Roxanne Bird	Carmen Lee Faulkner	Lori Murdick	Debra Dragon	Pine Point

== Round Robin Standings ==
Final standings

Key
Teams to Playoffs
Teams to Tiebreakers

Team	Skip	W	L
Saskatchewan	Kimberley Armbruster	9	1
British Columbia	Georgina Hawkes	9	1
Newfoundland	Jill Noseworthy	7	3
Ontario	Susan Shepley	7	3
Nova Scotia	Stephanie Jones	6	4
New Brunswick	Monique Masse	6	4
Prince Edward Island	Tracey Hubley	3	7
Manitoba	Bonnie Hagborg	2	8
Northwest Territories/Yukon	Roxanne Bird	2	8
Alberta	Lindsey Graves	2	8
Quebec	Ann Raby	2	8

=== Tiebreaker ===
March 15

Team	1	2	3	4	5	6	7	8	9	10	Final
Newfoundland (Noseworthy)	1	0	0	1	0	0	3	2	0	1	8
Ontario (Shepley)	0	1	0	0	2	1	0	0	0	0	4

== Playoffs ==
Semifinal			Final
			1	Saskatchewan	8
2	British Columbia	9	2	British Columbia	7
3	Newfoundland	6

=== Semifinal ===
March 16

Team	1	2	3	4	5	6	7	8	9	10	Final
British Columbia (Hawkes)	1	0	3	1	0	3	0	0	1	X	9
Newfoundland (Noseworthy)	0	1	0	0	2	0	2	1	0	X	6

=== Final ===
March 16

Team	1	2	3	4	5	6	7	8	9	10	11	Final
Saskatchewan (Ambruster)	2	0	2	0	1	0	1	0	0	1	1	8
British Columbia (Hawkes)	0	1	0	2	0	2	0	1	1	0	0	7
