= Deb Massullo =

Canadian female curler

- Curler

Team
- Curling club: Victoria CC, Victoria, BC

Curling career
- Member Association: British Columbia
- Hearts: 2 (1987, 1988)
- World Championship: 1 (1987)
Medal record
Curling
Representing Canada
World Championships
Gold medal – first place	1987 Chicago
Representing British Columbia
Scotties Tournament of Hearts
Gold medal – first place	1987 Lethbridge
Silver medal – second place	1988 Fredericton
Canadian Olympic Trials
Bronze medal – third place	1987 Calgary

Deborah Massullo is a Canadian curler from Powell River, British Columbia.

She is a 1987 World women's champion and a 1987 Canadian women's champion.

== Awards ==
- British Columbia Curling Hall of Fame: 1995, together with all of the Pat Sanders 1987 team.
- British Columbia Sports Hall of Fame: 1996, together with all of the 1987 Pat Sanders Rink.
- Greater Victoria Sports Hall of Fame: 1997

== Teams and events ==
Season	Skip	Third	Second	Lead	Alternate	Events
1984–85	Georgina Hawkes	Christine Stevenson	Tracey Barwick	Deb Massullo		CJCC 1985 (silver)
1986–87	Pat Sanders	Louise Herlinveaux	Georgina Hawkes	Deb Massullo	Elaine Dagg-Jackson	STOH 1987 (gold); WCC 1987 (silver)
1987–88	Pat Sanders	Louise Herlinveaux	Georgina Hawkes	Deb Massullo	Elaine Dagg-Jackson (STOH)	COCT 1987 (bronze); STOH 1988 (silver)
