= Dorenda Schoenhals =

Medal record

Women's Curling

Representing Saskatchewan

Canadian Ladies Curling Association Championship
Gold medal – first place	1970 Calgary	

Dorenda Alene Bailey (née Stirton; born c. 1947) better known as Dorenda Schoenhals (/ʃəˈnɔːlz/ shə-NAWLZ) is a Canadian curler. She is a former Canadian women's, mixed and university champion.

== Career ==
=== Youth ===
Schoenhals began curling in Grade 9 at her high school in Moose Jaw. In 1963, she skipped her Moose Jaw Central Collegiate high school team of Linda Thompson, Bev Rogers and Nola Heal to a provincial championship defeating the Gloria Clarke rink of Kindsersley. In 1964, she led her high school team, of Heal, Joan Howes and Nancy Small to the provincial final again, but lost to Sharon Wozny of Meath Park.

After graduating from Central Collegiate, Schoenhals went to the University of Saskatchewan and continued to curl for the university's curling team. Playing third on the team, skipped by Deanna Bryden, the university women's team won the Western Canada Intercollegiate Athletic Association Championships in 1965. Schoenhals took over as skip of the team in 1966, and led her rink of Kay Lukowich, Gloria Nolan and Carol Anne Giesbrecht to a second-straight Western Canada University title that year. Schoenhals won a third straight title in 1967, with team mates Dawn Forrest, Nolan, and Linda Burnham. The team would go on to win a special national championship held that year, known as "Olympiad '67", held as part of Canada's Centennial. Schoenhals won a fourth straight title in 1968. Schoenhals won a fifth straight Western Canada university title in 1969, leading her rink of sister Cheryl Stirton, Bunrham and Joan Andersen to victory in her final year at the University of Saskatchewan.

=== Women's ===
After University, Schoenhals found immediate success playing at the women's level. She led her team of sister Cheryl, Burnham and Andersen to win the Northern Saskatchewan title in 1970, defeating the defending Canadian champion Joyce McKee rink in the final. A week later, the team won the provincial championship, defeating Pauline Klaudeman in the final. This sent the team to the 1970 Canadian Ladies Curling Association Championship, where they represented Saskatchewan. The team was the youngest ever to play at the Canadian championship with a combined age of 81. Schoenhals also was five months pregnant at the time. At the championship, the team headed into the last day of round robin play with a 7-0 record, but lost both their final two games, forcing a three-way playoff. The team won their first playoff game, defeating Manitoba's Glenda Buhr rink 8-6. They then defeated Donna Clark and her British Columbia team in the final, 8-4. Schoenhals curled 71% in the final.

The team, now with Sharon Fyke throwing lead stones, could not repeat the success of their previous season, and were eliminated in the Nutana Curling Club playdowns in their attempt to return to the national championship. While they didn't even make it to the city playdowns that season, they did win the Saskatoon Women's Bonspiel and the Pot of Gold bonspiel that season. Schoenhals won a second Pot of Gold title the following year with new lead Claudia Cawood. That season, they also won the Callie women's cash bonspiel. The team, with new lead Candy Tennant won another Saskatoon Women's Bonspiel in 1973.

Schoenhals did not make it to the provincial championships again until 1975. At the 1975 Provincial Lassie, Schoenhals and her new rink of Linda Seaman (Burnham), Lee Morrison and Tennant lost in the 'B' final to Joyce McRae.

Three years later, Schoenhals and her rink of spare Pat Hamilton, Janet (Crimp) Johnson and Sue Hicks won the inaugural 1978 Autumn Gold Curling Classic, taking home $4,000 in the process. At the time, it was the richest bonspiel in women's curling.

Schoenhals moved to Regina in 1983 following her husband's election to the Legislative Assembly of Saskatchewan, and started curling out of the Callie Curling Club in her first season there. The next season, now curling out of the Tartan Club, she and team mates Myrna Graham, Kathy Bryden and Natalie Muir finally qualified for the provincial championships again, after winning the A side of the southern playdowns. It was Schoenhal's third provincial championship appearance. She was less successful at the 1985 Saskatchewan championship than the previous two occasions though, and was eliminated after losing her first two games. Schoenhals would later join the Crystal Brunas rink as her third, winning a provincial Intermediate (for curlers between 35 and 50 years old) title in 1988. Team Brunas qualified for the 1989 provincial championship. At the 1989 Saskatchewan Scott Tournament of Hearts, the team lost in the C Quarter-finals.

Schoenhals won another provincial Intermediate title (this time as a skip) in 1991 with team mates Linda Seaman, Kenda Richards and Gertie Pick.

Schoenhals, now known as Dorenda Bailey, won the Regina Ladies Bonspiel in 1992.

=== Seniors ===
Schoenhals would later move to Calgary, Alberta where she became active in seniors curling. She played in the 1998 Alberta Senior Women's Championship, finishing with a 3-4 record. The following season, she made it to the Alberta Senior final, losing to Sandy Turner 8-3 in the final. Schoenhals finally won the Alberta Senior Championships in 2000, defeating Mary Lynn Oates in the provincial final. This qualified her rink of Arlene Sali, Sheila Frank and Dianne Woima to represent Alberta at the 2000 Canadian Senior Curling Championships. There, she led her team to a 7-4 record, missing the playoffs.

She did not qualify for the provincial senior championships again until the 2003 event, where she missed the playoffs after losing in a tiebreaker match to Susan Seitz, after finishing the round robin with a 4–3 record. Schoenhals returned to the provincial seniors the following season, but finished with a worse 2–5 record.

In 2005, she won a first place finish at the Alberta 55 Plus Winter Games.

Schoenhals later returned to Regina, and played in one last provincial senior championship there in 2009.

=== Mixed ===
In mixed curling, Schoenhals won four provincial mixed titles (1975, 1981, 1982, 1983) playing third for a team skipped by Rick Folk. The team won the Canadian Mixed Curling Championship in 1983. She joined the team in 1975, replacing her sister Cheryl following their national championship win in 1974. At the 1975 Canadian Mixed Championship, the team finished tied for third with a 7-4 record. At the 1981 Canadian Mixed, the team made it to the final, where they played Northern Ontario, skipped by Rick Lang. The team lost the game 5-3, with Schoenhals curling 65%. At the 1982 Canadian Mixed, the team made it to the finals again, after posting a 9-2 round robin record, and winning their semifinal game against Prince Edward Island. In the finals however, they lost to British Columbia, skipped by Glen Pierce, 7-5. The team finally won the Canadian Mixed in 1983, after defeating Northern Ontario's Scott Hamilton rink 6-4 in the final.

=== Coaching ===
In addition to playing, Schoenhals also spent time coaching the Kim Mi-yeon Korean women's team.

== Personal life ==
Schoenhals is the daughter of Bernice Stirton (nee Boyle) and Alan Stirton. Schoenhals attended Petrolia School and Central Collegiate in Moose Jaw, Saskatchewan and received a Bachelor of Science in Nursing from the University of Saskatchewan in 1968. After graduating, she became a nursing instructor. In 1969, she married future politician Paul Schoenhals. They had three children. Schoenhals was employed as a nurse. She later married William D. Bailey, who died in 2001. Later in life she moved to Calgary, and then Vancouver c. 2013.

Her 1970 team was inducted into the Saskatchewan Sports Hall of Fame in 1989. Her 1983 mixed team was inducted in 2004.
