= Georgina Wheatcroft =

Canadian curler (born 1965)

- Curler ♀
- Born: Georgina Hawkes; November 30, 1965 (age 60); Nanaimo, British Columbia, Canada

Team
- Curling club: Royal City CC, New Westminster

Curling career
- Hearts: 8 (1987, 1988, 1989, 2000, 2001, 2004, 2006, 2007)
- Grand Slam victories: 1 (2006 Players' Championship)
Medal record
Women's curling
Representing Canada
Olympic Games
Bronze medal – third place	2002 Salt Lake City
World Championships
Gold medal – first place	1987 Chicago
Gold medal – first place	2000 Glasgow
Representing British Columbia
Scotties Tournament of Hearts
Gold medal – first place	1987 Lethbridge
Gold medal – first place	2000 Prince George
Silver medal – second place	1988 Fredericton
Silver medal – second place	2001 Sudbury
Silver medal – second place	2006 London
Canadian Olympic Curling Trials
Gold medal – first place	2001 Regina
Bronze medal – third place	1987 Calgary

Georgina Wheatcroft (born November 30, 1965, in Nanaimo, British Columbia, as Georgina Hawkes) is a Canadian curler. She is a two-time World Curling Champion and an Olympic bronze medalist.

== Curling career ==
Wheatcroft made her Scott Tournament of Hearts, the Canadian women's national championship, debut in 1987 as a third for Pat Sanders. Wheatcroft's prior experience had been as a skip at the Canadian Junior Curling Championships in 1985 for British Columbia. Sanders, Wheatcroft, and their British Columbia team won the 1987 Scott Tournament of Hearts, defeating Kathie Ellwood in the final. At the World Championships that year, the team won the gold medal defeating Germany's Andrea Schöpp in the final. In 1988 Wheatcroft played second for Sanders at the Tournament of Hearts and they lost in the final to Heather Houston. In 1989, Wheatcroft moved to Julie Sutton's team and again qualified for the Tournament of Hearts, where they would lose in their first playoff game. Wheatcroft would not go back to the Hearts until 2000.

In 2000, Wheatcroft played second for Kelley Law's rink. With Law, Wheatcroft won that year's Scott Tournament of Hearts and World Curling Championships. The team were runners up at the following 2001 Scott Tournament of Hearts, where they lost to Colleen Jones. The following year the team qualified for the 2002 Winter Olympics as Team Canada. The team defeated Team United States to win the bronze medal.

In 2004, Wheatcroft skipped her own team to the 2004 Scott Tournament of Hearts, but her new team finished 4-7. She attempted to qualify the following year, but lost in the British Columbia playdowns. In 2005, she was picked up by that year's Hearts champion Jennifer Jones to replace Cathy Gauthier, and she moved to Winnipeg, Manitoba, to play with the team. With her new team, Wheatcroft played in that year's Olympic trials; the team finished with a 5–4 record. Wheatcroft had the opportunity to play in the 2006 Scott Tournament of Hearts because Jones had won it the previous year, and thus got to play as Team Canada. The team lost in the final to Kelly Scott of British Columbia.

2006 saw Wheatcroft return to playing with Kelley Law, as her third. In 2007, the team made their way back to the national championship, now called the Scotties Tournament of Hearts, after winning the B.C. Provincial Championship. At the Scotties they finished with a 5–6 record.

In 2008, she once again skipped her own team and qualified for the 2009 British Columbia Scotties Tournament of Hearts.

== Grand Slam record ==
Key
C	Champion
F	Lost in Final
SF	Lost in Semifinal
QF	Lost in Quarterfinals
R16	Lost in the round of 16
Q	Did not advance to playoffs
T2	Played in Tier 2 event
DNP	Did not participate in event
N/A	Not a Grand Slam event that season

Event	2006–07	2007–08	2008–09	2009–10
Autumn Gold	DNP	Q	Q	Q
Manitoba Lotteries	QF	Q	DNP	DNP
Wayden Transportation	Q	Q	QF	DNP
Sobeys Slam	N/A	Q	DNP	DNP
Players'	SF	DNP	DNP	DNP

== Teams ==
Season	Skip	Third	Second	Lead
1984–85	Georgina Hawkes	Christine Stevenson	Tracey Barwick	Deb Massullo
1986–87	Pat Sanders	Georgina Hawkes	Louise Herlinveaux	Deb Massullo
1987–88	Pat Sanders	Louise Herlinveaux	Georgina Hawkes	Deb Massullo
1988–89	Julie Sutton	Pat Sanders	Georgina Hawkes	Melissa Soligo
1999–00	Kelley Law	Julie Skinner	Georgina Wheatcroft	Diane Nelson
2000–01	Kelley Law	Julie Skinner	Georgina Wheatcroft	Diane Nelson
2001–02	Kelley Law	Julie Skinner	Georgina Wheatcroft	Diane Nelson
2002–03	Kelley Law	Julie Skinner	Georgina Wheatcroft	Diane Dezura
2003–04	Georgina Wheatcroft	Diane McLean	Shellan Reed	Diane Dezura
2004–05	Georgina Wheatcroft	Diane Gushulak	Kristen Recksiedler	Mila Hockley
2005–06	Jennifer Jones	Cathy Overton-Clapham	Jill Officer	Georgina Wheatcroft
2006–07	Kelley Law	Georgina Wheatcroft	Shannon Aleksic	Darah Provencal
2007–08	Colleen Jones	Georgina Wheatcroft	Kate Hamer	Darah Provencal
2008–09	Georgina Wheatcroft	Steph Jackson	Kristen Windsor	Niki Hatter
2009–10	Georgina Wheatcroft	Steph Jackson	Sarah Wark	Kristen Windsor
