= 1970 Canadian Ladies Curling Association Championship =

Canadian women's curling championship

- Host city: Calgary, Alberta
- Arena: Stampede Corral
- Dates: February 23–27
- Attendance: 13,796
- Winner: Saskatchewan
- Curling club: Nutana CC, Saskatoon
- Skip: Dorenda Schoenhals
- Third: Cheryl Stirton
- Second: Linda Burnham
- Lead: Joan Andersen
- Coach: Sylvia Fedoruk (chaperone)
- Finalist: British Columbia (Donna Clark); Manitoba (Glenda Buhr)

The 1970 Canadian Ladies Curling Association Championship the Canadian women's curling championship was held from February 23 to 27, 1970 the Stampede Corral in Calgary, Alberta.

British Columbia, Manitoba, and Saskatchewan all finished round robin play tied for first with 7–2 records, necessitating a tiebreaker playoff between the three teams to determine the championship. Team Saskatchewan, who was skipped by Dorenda Schoenhals captured the championship by defeating both Manitoba 8–6 in the semifinal and British Columbia 8–4 in the final. This was Saskatchewan's third championship and second in a row. This was the first time in history that a three-way tiebreaker determined the championship.

British Columbia's 13–0 victory over Quebec in Draw 7 was the second time in which a team posted a shutout in tournament history. The only other shutout was also posted by BC in 1963.

The tournament set or tied several records, some of which still stand as of 2023.

- The event had a then-record attendance of 13,796.
- Saskatchewan set a record for most points scored by a team in one event with 105. This included the two tiebreaker games they played for the championship. This would eventually end up being a pre-Scotties record (prior to 1982).
- BC's victories over Quebec in Draw 7 and Nova Scotia in Draw 9 set a record for fewest ends played in one game as both games only lasted six ends. This record would be eventually broken in 1986.
- BC's 12–11 victory over Prince Edward Island set a record for the largest come-from-behind victory after BC trailed 10–0 through six ends. This is still a record as of 2023.

== Event Summary ==
Heading into the Wednesday evening draw (Draw 7), there were five teams with a shot at the championship. Saskatchewan sat in first at 6–0, Manitoba was in second at 5–1, while both British Columbia and Quebec sat at 4–2, and Ontario was 3–3.

The Wednesday evening draw dwindled that number down to three. Saskatchewan remained unbeaten with their 13–9 victory over Nova Scotia and eliminating Ontario from contention despite their 11–7 win over New Brunswick. BC shutout Quebec 13–0, which eliminated Quebec while Manitoba held off Prince Edward Island 9–8. At this point, Saskatchewan appeared to be heading for a championship as a win over Manitoba on Thursday morning would clinch Saskatchewan the title.

The penultimate draw on Thursday morning would see a couple of comebacks that turned the event from an easy victory to coming down to the final draw. After scoring three in the seventh, Saskatchewan lead Manitoba 6–4. However, Manitoba would come back to tie the game at 6 with one in the eighth and a steal of one in the ninth. With Saskatchewan having hammer and a chance to clinch the championship in the last end, it was Manitoba who would steal three for a 9–6 victory and handing Saskatchewan their first loss of the tournament. Meanwhile, it appeared that BC would be eliminated as they trailed PEI 10–0 through six ends. But BC would score six in the seventh and steal one in the eighth to make it a game. After PEI scored one in the ninth, BC would score four to tie the game at 11 and force an extra end. BC remained alive as they completed the largest comeback in tournament history with a steal of one in the extra end for an improbable 12–11 win. Heading into the final draw, both Manitoba and Saskatchewan sat at 7–1 with BC one game back at 6–2.

The final draw of round robin play would end up as exciting as the previous draw. BC would do their job with a 12–3 victory over Nova Scotia to remain alive as they needed both Manitoba and Saskatchewan to lose to be in the playoff. Saskatchewan was in a back and forth battle with PEI as they were tied at 5 through seven ends. After a blank eighth end, PEI took a 7–5 lead heading into the final end. Saskatchewan would counter with two to force an extra end. But with hammer, PEI would score two for a 9–7 victory. Now it appeared that Manitoba would control their destiny as they lead 6–3 after seven ends against Ontario. However, Ontario would proceed to score one in the eighth and stole one in each of the next two ends to force an extra end. Ontario completed their comeback with a steal in the extra end for a 7–6 victory. This meant that a three-way tiebreaker playoff between BC, Manitoba, and Saskatchewan on Friday would determine the championship.

For the playoff, following a draw from a stetson hat, Manitoba and Saskatchewan drew the semifinal pairing while British Columbia received a bye into the final. In the semifinal on Friday morning, Saskatchewan regained their footing as they jumped out to a 6–3 lead through five ends and 8–4 after eight ends. Despite Manitoba cutting the lead to 8–6 after nine, it was too little too late as Manitoba conceded the final end, setting up a BC/Saskatchewan final.

In the championship on Friday afternoon, Saskatchewan scored two in the first end but BC scored singles in the next four ends to take a 4–2 lead at the halfway point. However, Saskatchewan scored three in the sixth to regain the lead then sealed the championship by stealing one in three straight ends for an 8–4 victory after BC conceded the tenth end.

== Teams ==
The teams are listed as follows:

Alberta	British Columbia	Manitoba	New Brunswick	Newfoundland
Thistle Ladies CC, Edmonton Skip: Betty Cole; Third: Doris Olsen; Second: Betty Jamison; Lead: Bonnie Cessford	McPherson Winter Ladies CC, Burnaby Skip: Donna Clark; Third: Mavis Gordon; Second: Marjorie Mitchell; Lead: Gladys Nord	Elmwood CC, Winnipeg Skip: Glenda Buhr; Third: Rose Taylor; Second: Mary Robertson; Lead: Miriam Cook	Bathurst Ladies CC, Bathurst Skip: Shirley Pilson; Third: Anne Orser; Second: Patricia Maher; Lead: Geraldine Lenihan	Grand Falls CC, Grand Falls Skip: Violet Pike; Third: Gladys Clark; Second: Caroline Ball; Lead: Lillian Howse
Nova Scotia	Ontario	Prince Edward Island	Quebec	Saskatchewan
Liverpool CC, Liverpool Skip: Audrey Thorbourne; Third: Marina Wood; Second: Pamela Raddal; Lead: Shirley Wyer	Kingston CC, Kingston Skip: Kay O'Neill; Third: Thelma Graves; Second: Shirley Keeley; Lead: Doreen Main	Charlottetown CC, Charlottetown Skip: Marie Toole; Third: Jennie Boomhower; Second: Cathy Dillon; Lead: Pauline Johnston	Caledonia CC, Westmount Skip: Lee Tobin; Third: Joy Sjare; Second: Perry Landrigan; Lead: Michelle Garneau	Nutana CC, Saskatoon Skip: Dorenda Schoenhals; Third: Cheryl Stirton; Second: Linda Burnham; Lead: Joan Andersen

== Map of teams ==
Provincial Winners

== Round robin standings ==
Final Round Robin standings

Key
Teams to Tiebreaker

Province	Skip	W	L	PF	PA
British Columbia	Donna Clark	7	2	93	58
Manitoba	Glenda Buhr	7	2	82	58
Saskatchewan	Dorenda Schoenhals	7	2	89	56
Quebec	Lee Tobin	6	3	78	64
Ontario	Kay O'Neill	6	3	77	78
Prince Edward Island	Marie Toole	4	5	82	78
Newfoundland	Violet Pike	3	6	65	87
Nova Scotia	Audrey Thorbourne	2	7	52	91
New Brunswick	Shirley Pilson	2	7	63	84
Alberta	Betty Cole	1	8	57	84

== Round robin results ==
All draw times are listed in Mountain Standard Time (UTC-07:00).

=== Draw 1 ===
Monday, February 23, 2:30 pm

Team	1	2	3	4	5	6	7	8	9	10	Final
Manitoba (Buhr)	0	2	3	1	3	0	2	0	0	X	11
Nova Scotia (Thorbourne)	1	0	0	0	0	1	0	1	0	X	3

Team	1	2	3	4	5	6	7	8	9	10	Final
Saskatchewan (Schoenhals)	2	0	2	0	1	1	3	0	0	3	12
Quebec (Tobin)	0	1	0	1	0	0	0	2	1	0	5

Team	1	2	3	4	5	6	7	8	9	10	Final
Newfoundland (Pike)	0	2	0	0	4	0	3	2	0	1	12
Prince Edward Island (Toole)	1	0	3	3	0	2	0	0	0	0	9

Team	1	2	3	4	5	6	7	8	9	10	11	Final
British Columbia (Clark)	0	2	2	0	0	1	1	0	1	0	3	10
New Brunswick (Pilson)	1	0	0	1	1	0	0	3	0	1	0	7

Team	1	2	3	4	5	6	7	8	9	10	Final
Alberta (Cole)	0	1	0	0	2	1	1	0	0	1	6
Ontario (O'Neill)	2	0	2	1	0	0	0	1	1	0	7

=== Draw 2 ===
Monday, February 23, 8:00 pm

Team	1	2	3	4	5	6	7	8	9	10	Final
New Brunswick (Pilson)	0	0	0	2	1	1	0	1	4	1	10
Prince Edward Island (Toole)	1	1	1	0	0	0	1	0	0	0	4

Team	1	2	3	4	5	6	7	8	9	10	Final
Saskatchewan (Schoenhals)	2	0	2	2	3	0	1	0	1	X	11
Newfoundland (Pike)	0	1	0	0	0	1	0	1	0	X	3

Team	1	2	3	4	5	6	7	8	9	10	Final
Alberta (Cole)	0	2	0	0	0	0	0	1	0	X	3
Nova Scotia (Thorbourne)	0	0	1	1	1	1	2	0	1	X	7

Team	1	2	3	4	5	6	7	8	9	10	Final
British Columbia (Clark)	0	1	0	3	0	3	0	2	1	X	10
Manitoba (Buhr)	2	0	2	0	1	0	1	0	0	X	6

Team	1	2	3	4	5	6	7	8	9	10	Final
Ontario (O'Neill)	2	3	2	1	0	0	0	1	0	0	9
Quebec (Tobin)	0	0	0	0	2	1	2	0	3	2	10

=== Draw 3 ===
Tuesday, February 24, 9:30 am

Team	1	2	3	4	5	6	7	8	9	10	Final
Alberta (Cole)	0	3	0	0	1	0	0	1	1	X	6
British Columbia (Clark)	1	0	4	2	0	4	1	0	0	X	12

Team	1	2	3	4	5	6	7	8	9	10	Final
Saskatchewan (Schoenhals)	1	1	0	2	1	2	2	0	4	X	13
New Brunswick (Pilson)	0	0	1	0	0	0	0	3	0	X	4

Team	1	2	3	4	5	6	7	8	9	10	Final
Nova Scotia (Thorbourne)	0	1	0	0	0	1	0	0	0	X	2
Newfoundland (Pike)	3	0	2	1	2	0	1	3	0	X	12

Team	1	2	3	4	5	6	7	8	9	10	Final
Ontario (O'Neill)	1	2	0	0	0	0	1	0	3	0	7
Prince Edward Island (Toole)	0	0	2	1	1	2	0	1	0	4	11

Team	1	2	3	4	5	6	7	8	9	10	11	Final
Manitoba (Buhr)	1	0	1	0	1	0	2	0	1	1	2	9
Quebec (Tobin)	0	2	0	2	0	2	0	1	0	0	0	7

=== Draw 4 ===
Tuesday, February 24, 8:00 pm

Team	1	2	3	4	5	6	7	8	9	10	Final
Saskatchewan (Schoenhals)	1	0	2	0	0	5	0	1	1	X	10
Alberta (Cole)	0	1	0	1	1	0	1	0	0	X	4

Team	1	2	3	4	5	6	7	8	9	10	Final
British Columbia (Clark)	0	0	2	0	0	1	1	0	1	0	5
Ontario (O'Neill)	2	1	0	2	1	0	0	1	0	1	8

Team	1	2	3	4	5	6	7	8	9	10	Final
Nova Scotia (Thorbourne)	2	0	1	0	0	1	0	0	1	0	5
Prince Edward Island (Toole)	0	3	0	1	1	0	5	1	0	1	12

Team	1	2	3	4	5	6	7	8	9	10	Final
Manitoba (Buhr)	1	0	2	4	3	0	0	1	0	X	11
New Brunswick (Pilson)	0	3	0	0	0	1	1	0	1	X	6

Team	1	2	3	4	5	6	7	8	9	10	11	Final
Newfoundland (Pike)	1	2	0	1	0	4	1	0	0	0	0	9
Quebec (Tobin)	0	0	4	0	1	0	0	0	2	2	5	14

=== Draw 5 ===
Wednesday, February 25, 9:30 am

Team	1	2	3	4	5	6	7	8	9	10	Final
British Columbia (Clark)	0	2	1	0	2	0	1	0	3	2	11
Newfoundland (Pike)	3	0	0	2	0	2	0	1	0	0	8

Team	1	2	3	4	5	6	7	8	9	10	Final
New Brunswick (Pilson)	3	0	1	0	0	0	1	1	0	X	6
Nova Scotia (Thorbourne)	0	1	0	2	2	3	0	0	3	X	11

Team	1	2	3	4	5	6	7	8	9	10	Final
Manitoba (Buhr)	1	0	0	3	0	2	0	1	0	X	7
Alberta (Cole)	0	1	0	0	2	0	1	0	2	X	6

Team	1	2	3	4	5	6	7	8	9	10	Final
Saskatchewan (Schoenhals)	1	1	1	1	0	2	0	2	0	X	8
Ontario (O'Neill)	0	0	0	0	2	0	2	0	1	X	5

Team	1	2	3	4	5	6	7	8	9	10	11	Final
Quebec (Tobin)	2	0	2	2	2	0	0	1	0	0	1	10
Prince Edward Island (Toole)	0	1	0	0	0	3	3	0	1	1	0	9

=== Draw 6 ===
Wednesday, February 25, 2:30 pm

Team	1	2	3	4	5	6	7	8	9	10	Final
Saskatchewan (Schoenhals)	1	0	0	1	0	0	4	0	2	1	9
British Columbia (Clark)	0	1	1	0	3	1	0	2	0	0	8

Team	1	2	3	4	5	6	7	8	9	10	Final
Manitoba (Buhr)	0	3	0	6	1	0	4	0	X	X	14
Newfoundland (Pike)	1	0	2	0	0	1	0	1	X	X	5

Team	1	2	3	4	5	6	7	8	9	10	Final
New Brunswick (Pilson)	1	0	1	0	1	0	2	0	1	1	7
Quebec (Tobin)	0	1	0	4	0	2	0	1	0	0	8

Team	1	2	3	4	5	6	7	8	9	10	Final
Ontario (O'Neill)	2	0	0	0	0	4	0	3	1	4	14
Nova Scotia (Thorbourne)	0	2	2	1	1	0	2	0	0	0	8

Team	1	2	3	4	5	6	7	8	9	10	Final
Alberta (Cole)	0	1	3	0	0	0	0	0	2	X	6
Prince Edward Island (Toole)	1	0	0	1	2	1	3	1	0	X	9

=== Draw 7 ===
Wednesday, February 25, 8:00 pm

Team	1	2	3	4	5	6	7	8	9	10	Final
British Columbia (Clark)	3	3	2	1	3	1	X	X	X	X	13
Quebec (Tobin)	0	0	0	0	0	0	X	X	X	X	0

Team	1	2	3	4	5	6	7	8	9	10	Final
Saskatchewan (Schoenhals)	0	3	0	2	0	5	0	3	0	X	13
Nova Scotia (Thorbourne)	1	0	2	0	3	0	2	0	1	X	9

Team	1	2	3	4	5	6	7	8	9	10	Final
Newfoundland (Pike)	3	0	1	2	0	0	0	3	0	X	9
Alberta (Cole)	0	1	0	0	5	0	1	0	1	X	8

Team	1	2	3	4	5	6	7	8	9	10	Final
Manitoba (Buhr)	0	0	4	0	3	0	0	0	1	1	9
Prince Edward Island (Toole)	2	1	0	1	0	2	1	1	0	0	8

Team	1	2	3	4	5	6	7	8	9	10	Final
Ontario (O'Neill)	0	1	0	1	1	2	0	2	0	4	11
New Brunswick (Pilson)	2	0	0	0	0	0	2	0	3	0	7

=== Draw 8 ===
Thursday, February 26, 2:30 pm

Team	1	2	3	4	5	6	7	8	9	10	Final
Quebec (Tobin)	1	0	1	1	0	0	3	0	2	X	8
Nova Scotia (Thorbourne)	0	1	0	0	1	1	0	1	0	X	4

Team	1	2	3	4	5	6	7	8	9	10	Final
Newfoundland (Pike)	0	0	1	0	1	0	0	1	0	X	3
Ontario (O'Neill)	2	1	0	1	0	2	3	0	1	X	10

Team	1	2	3	4	5	6	7	8	9	10	Final
Alberta (Cole)	1	1	1	0	1	0	3	0	0	5	12
New Brunswick (Pilson)	0	0	0	3	0	1	0	3	1	0	8

Team	1	2	3	4	5	6	7	8	9	10	Final
Saskatchewan (Schoenhals)	0	0	2	0	1	0	3	0	0	0	6
Manitoba (Buhr)	1	1	0	1	0	1	0	1	1	3	9

Team	1	2	3	4	5	6	7	8	9	10	11	Final
British Columbia (Clark)	0	0	0	0	0	0	6	1	0	4	1	12
Prince Edward Island (Toole)	3	2	1	2	1	1	0	0	1	0	0	11

=== Draw 9 ===
Thursday, February 26, 8:00 pm

Team	1	2	3	4	5	6	7	8	9	10	Final
British Columbia (Clark)	2	0	5	0	4	1	X	X	X	X	12
Nova Scotia (Thorbourne)	0	1	0	2	0	0	X	X	X	X	3

Team	1	2	3	4	5	6	7	8	9	10	Final
Alberta (Cole)	2	0	0	0	0	2	2	0	X	X	6
Quebec (Tobin)	0	2	5	3	4	0	0	1	X	X	15

Team	1	2	3	4	5	6	7	8	9	10	Final
Newfoundland (Pike)	0	0	0	1	2	0	0	1	0	X	4
New Brunswick (Pilson)	2	1	1	0	0	2	1	0	1	X	8

Team	1	2	3	4	5	6	7	8	9	10	11	Final
Saskatchewan (Schoenhals)	0	1	1	0	0	1	2	0	0	2	0	7
Prince Edward Island (Toole)	2	0	0	2	1	0	0	0	2	0	2	9

Team	1	2	3	4	5	6	7	8	9	10	11	Final
Manitoba (Buhr)	1	2	0	1	1	0	1	0	0	0	0	6
Ontario (O'Neill)	0	0	2	0	0	1	0	1	1	1	1	7

== Tiebreakers ==
Semifinal		Final
		British Columbia	4
Saskatchewan	8	Saskatchewan	8
Manitoba	6

=== Semifinal ===
Friday, February 27, 9:30 am

Team	1	2	3	4	5	6	7	8	9	10	Final
Saskatchewan (Schoenhals)	0	3	0	1	2	0	1	1	0	X	8
Manitoba (Buhr)	2	0	1	0	0	1	0	0	2	X	6

=== Final ===
Friday, February 27, 1:30 pm

Team	1	2	3	4	5	6	7	8	9	10	Final
Saskatchewan (Schoenhals)	2	0	0	0	0	3	1	1	1	X	8
British Columbia (Clark)	0	1	1	1	1	0	0	0	0	X	4
