= Joan Andersen =

Canadian curler and journalist (1949–2022)

Medal record

Women's Curling

Representing Saskatchewan

Canadian Ladies Curling Association Championship
Gold medal – first place	1970 Calgary	

Joan Elaine Andersen (August 26, 1949 – November 9, 2022) was a Canadian curler and journalist.

== Early life ==
Andersen was born in Nokomis, Saskatchewan in 1949, the daughter of Alice (Swanson) and Herluf Andersen, an immigrant from Denmark. She grew up on the family's farm outside of Govan, Saskatchewan, where she began curling. She attended the University of Saskatchewan, where she took philosophy and music history, and joined the school's curling team.

== Curling ==
Playing lead for the University of Saskatchewan curling team (skipped by Dorenda Stirton), Andersen won the Western Canadian Intercollegiate championship in 1969. The team stuck together the following season to play in women's curling, with skip Stirton now under the married name Dorenda Schoenhals. They won the Northern Saskatchewan title in 1970, defeating the defending Canadian champion Joyce McKee rink in the final. A week later, the team won the provincial championship, defeating Pauline Klaudeman in the final. This sent the team to the 1970 Canadian Ladies Curling Association Championship, where they represented Saskatchewan. The team was the youngest ever to play at the Canadian championship with a combined age of 81. At the championship, the team headed into the last day of round robin play with a 7–0 record, but lost both their final two games, forcing a three-way playoff. The team won their first playoff game, defeating Manitoba's Glenda Buhr rink 8–6. They then defeated Donna Clark and her British Columbia team in the final, 8–4. Andersen curled 73% in the final. The team was inducted into the Saskatchewan Sports Hall of Fame in 1989. According to Schoenhals, Andersen never threw another curling rock after winning the championship, having accomplished her curling goals at just the age of 20.

== Journalism ==
Andersen moved to Vancouver in the early 1970s, where she earned a Master's of Library Science at the University of British Columbia. She then went on to work for CBC Radio as a reporter, morning show host and producer. She later worked as the senior producer for the CBC's flagship television news program, The National in Toronto, and as the broadcaster's bureau chief in Washington, D.C. From 1999 to 2009 she was the director of radio and programming in Vancouver. After retiring with the CBC, she worked for Mosaic, an organization that serves immigrants and refugees.

== Death ==
After being diagnosed with breast cancer in 2020, she died using Canada's Medical Assistance in Dying (MAiD) program in 2022.

== Personal life ==
Divorced earlier in her life, she had a 48-year relationship with fellow journalist Allen Garr. The couple had a cabin on Texada Island. She volunteered for the Vancouver Public Library and advocated for cycling in the city.
