= Kathie Allardyce =

Canadian curler

Medal record

Curling

Scott Tournament of Hearts
Silver medal – second place	1987 Lethbridge	

Kathie Allardyce (née Ellwood; born c. 1961) is a Canadian curler from Winnipeg, Manitoba. She is a two-time provincial women's champion.

Allardyce (then known as Kathie Ellwood) and her rink of Cathy Treloar, twin sister Laurie Ellwood and Sandi Asham won the first of her two provincial titles in 1987, defeating the defending champion Darcy Kirkness rink in the process. Her team then represented Manitoba at the 1987 Scott Tournament of Hearts, Canada's national curling championship. At the Hearts, she led Manitoba to an 8-3 round robin record, which put her in first place, with a berth in the final. In the final, she lost to team British Columbia, skipped by Pat Sanders, 9-3. A month later, Allardyce played in the 1987 Canadian Olympic Curling Trials to determine Canada's representative at the 1988 Winter Olympics where curling was a demonstration sport. The event was a disappointing affair for the Ellwood rink, which finished the event with a 2-5 record.

Allardyce with teammates Cathy Overton, sister Laurie and Jill Proctor won her second provincial title in 1991, defeating former World Champion Connie Laliberte in the final of the 1991 Manitoba Hearts. At the 1991 Scott Tournament of Hearts, she had less success, leading her team to a 5-6 record, missing the playoffs.

Later in life, Allardyce was the fifth on the Manitoba senior women's championship team in 2012.
