= Albert E. Peacock Collegiate =

Location
- 145 Ross St. E Moose Jaw, Saskatchewan; Canada
- Coordinates: 50°23′50″N 105°31′49″W

Information
- Type: Public
- Motto: "Excelling Together"
- Established: 1931
- School district: Prairie South School Division
- Principal: Tana Arnott
- Faculty: 55
- Grades: 9–12
- Enrollment: 645 (2022)
- Colors: Green and Orange
- Nickname: Tornadoes or Toilers
- Website: schools.prairiesouth.ca/peacock/

Albert E. Peacock Collegiate is a high school located in Moose Jaw, Saskatchewan, Canada. It was constructed in 1931 and was originally named Moose Jaw Technical High School. It was later renamed Albert E. Peacock Technical High School after a long serving principal and school board superintendent, Albert. E Peacock. Its final name change was to Albert E.Peacock Collegiate to reflect the transition in programming that the school had evolved with. The school has the biggest stage among all of Moose Jaw's high schools. Also, due to the size of their gymnasium, Peacock is host to many provincially known athletic teams especially the Peacock Tornadoes football team.
