= 2000 Canadian Senior Curling Championships =

- Host city: Portage la Prairie, Manitoba
- Arena: Portage Curling Club
- Dates: January 22–30, 2000
- Men's winner: Ontario
- Skip: Bob Turcotte
- Third: Roy Weigand
- Second: Bob Lichti
- Lead: Steve McDermot
- Finalist: British Columbia
- Women's winner: Quebec
- Skip: Agnes Charette
- Third: Martha Don
- Second: Lois Baines
- Lead: Mary Anne Robertson
- Finalist: Saskatchewan

The 2000 Canadian Senior Curling Championships were held January 22 to 30 at the Portage Curling Club in Portage la Prairie, Manitoba.

== Men's ==
=== Teams ===
Province / Territory	Skip	Third	Second	Lead
Alberta	Al Pankoski	Len Sterling	Mitch Hansuk	Herb Zmurchuk
British Columbia	Wayne Laface	Val Schwab	John Hockey	Barry Brown
Manitoba	Kenneth Grove	Dave Suchy	Larry Weatherburn	Helmut Ostermann
New Brunswick	Hap Mabey	Leslie Dryden	Norm Denis	Tolson Penney
Newfoundland	Damien Ryan	Fred Wight	Sel Warren	Boyd Day
Northern Ontario	Mike Coulter	Mike Sagle	Wayne McClelland	Rick Elliott
Nova Scotia	Lowell Goulden	Peter MacPhee	Robert Teale	Donald Ross
Ontario	Bob Turcotte	Roy Weigand	Bob Lichti	Steve McDermot
Prince Edward Island	Jim Trainor	Paul Saulnier	Bobby Dillon	John Stewart
Quebec	Don Aitken	Doug Hanson	Brian Ross	Bob Suderman
Saskatchewan	Gary Bryden	Dale Graham	Wilf Foss	Gerry Zimmer
Northwest Territories/Yukon	Don Strang	Fred Koe	Bradford Whitehead	Garry Lobb

=== Standings ===
Locale	Skip	W	L
British Columbia	Wayne Laface	8	3
Ontario	Bob Turcotte	8	3
Northern Ontario	Mike Coulter	8	3
Saskatchewan	Gary Bryden	7	4
Alberta	Al Pankoski	7	4
Nova Scotia	Lowell Goulden	5	6
Prince Edward Island	Jim Trainor	5	6
Manitoba	Kenneth Grove	5	6
New Brunswick	Hap Mabey	4	7
Quebec	Don Aitken	4	7
Newfoundland	Damien Ryan	3	8
Northwest Territories/Yukon	Don Strang	2	9

=== Results ===
==== Draw 1 ====
Sheet B	1	2	3	4	5	6	7	8	9	10	Final
New Brunswick (Mabey)	0	0	0	1	0	1	0	2	X	X	4
Nova Scotia (Goulden)	0	4	1	0	2	0	1	0	X	X	8

Sheet D	1	2	3	4	5	6	7	8	9	10	Final
Prince Edward Island (Trainor)	0	1	0	1	0	1	1	0	2	0	6
British Columbia (Laface)	3	0	1	0	1	0	0	1	0	1	7

Sheet F	1	2	3	4	5	6	7	8	9	10	Final
Ontario (Turcotte)	0	2	1	0	0	2	1	1	0	X	7
Alberta (Pankoski)	0	0	0	1	1	0	0	0	1	X	3

==== Draw 2 ====
Sheet B	1	2	3	4	5	6	7	8	9	10	Final
Saskatchewan (Bryden)	0	2	0	0	0	1	0	0	1	X	4
Manitoba (Grove)	1	0	2	2	1	0	1	1	0	X	8

Sheet D	1	2	3	4	5	6	7	8	9	10	Final
Northern Ontario (Coulter)	0	2	1	0	0	2	1	0	0	2	8
Newfoundland (Ryan)	2	0	0	1	0	0	0	3	1	0	7

Sheet F	1	2	3	4	5	6	7	8	9	10	Final
Northwest Territories/Yukon (Strang)	0	0	0	1	0	1	0	1	0	3	6
Quebec (Aitken)	0	0	1	0	1	0	1	0	1	0	4

==== Draw 3 ====
Sheet A	1	2	3	4	5	6	7	8	9	10	Final
New Brunswick (Mabey)	1	2	0	0	0	0	3	0	0	X	6
Prince Edward Island (Trainor)	0	0	1	1	1	2	0	3	2	X	10

Sheet C	1	2	3	4	5	6	7	8	9	10	Final
Alberta (Pankoski)	3	0	0	1	0	1	1	0	0	1	7
British Columbia (Laface)	0	1	1	0	3	0	0	1	0	0	6

Sheet E	1	2	3	4	5	6	7	8	9	10	Final
Ontario (Turcotte)	1	0	3	1	0	2	0	2	X	X	9
Nova Scotia (Goulden)	0	1	0	0	1	0	1	0	X	X	3

==== Draw 4 ====
Sheet A	1	2	3	4	5	6	7	8	9	10	Final
Northern Ontario (Coulter)	0	3	0	1	0	1	1	0	1	X	7
Saskatchewan (Bryden)	0	0	1	0	1	0	0	1	0	X	3

Sheet C	1	2	3	4	5	6	7	8	9	10	Final
Quebec (Aitken)	0	1	0	1	0	2	0	2	0	X	6
Manitoba (Grove)	3	0	3	0	2	0	1	0	3	X	12

Sheet E	1	2	3	4	5	6	7	8	9	10	Final
Northwest Territories/Yukon (Strang)	1	0	1	0	0	0	1	1	0	X	4
Newfoundland (Ryan)	0	2	0	0	2	1	0	0	1	X	6

==== Draw 5 ====
Sheet A	1	2	3	4	5	6	7	8	9	10	Final
Nova Scotia (Goulden)	2	0	0	0	0	0	2	0	1	1	6
Alberta (Pankoski)	0	0	0	0	2	2	0	3	0	0	7

Sheet C	1	2	3	4	5	6	7	8	9	10	Final
Prince Edward Island (Trainor)	0	2	0	1	0	X	X	X	X	X	3
Ontario (Turcotte)	4	0	2	0	3	X	X	X	X	X	9

Sheet E	1	2	3	4	5	6	7	8	9	10	Final
British Columbia (Laface)	5	0	0	0	2	0	0	3	0	1	11
New Brunswick (Mabey)	0	3	0	3	0	0	2	0	1	0	9

==== Draw 6 ====
Sheet A	1	2	3	4	5	6	7	8	9	10	Final
Newfoundland (Ryan)	0	0	0	1	0	0	0	X	X	X	1
Quebec (Aitken)	0	1	1	0	1	1	3	X	X	X	7

Sheet C	1	2	3	4	5	6	7	8	9	10	Final
Saskatchewan (Bryden)	1	0	0	3	0	0	2	0	2	X	8
Northwest Territories/Yukon (Strang)	0	2	1	0	1	1	0	1	0	X	6

Sheet E	1	2	3	4	5	6	7	8	9	10	11	Final
Manitoba (Grove)	1	0	1	1	0	0	2	0	3	1	0	9
Northern Ontario (Coulter)	0	1	0	0	2	3	0	3	0	0	1	10

==== Draw 7 ====
Sheet B	1	2	3	4	5	6	7	8	9	10	Final
Quebec (Aitken)	1	0	1	0	1	0	1	0	0	X	4
Saskatchewan (Bryden)	0	1	0	1	0	2	0	4	1	X	9

Sheet D	1	2	3	4	5	6	7	8	9	10	Final
Northwest Territories/Yukon (Strang)	1	0	0	1	0	0	X	X	X	X	2
Northern Ontario (Coulter)	0	3	3	0	2	3	X	X	X	X	11

Sheet F	1	2	3	4	5	6	7	8	9	10	Final
Newfoundland (Ryan)	2	0	2	0	0	0	0	0	0	X	4
Manitoba (Grove)	0	1	0	1	1	1	2	1	1	X	8

==== Draw 8 ====
Sheet B	1	2	3	4	5	6	7	8	9	10	Final
Alberta (Pankoski)	0	0	1	0	1	1	1	1	0	1	6
Prince Edward Island (Trainor)	1	0	0	2	0	0	0	0	2	0	5

Sheet D	1	2	3	4	5	6	7	8	9	10	Final
Nova Scotia (Goulden)	0	1	0	3	0	2	0	2	X	X	8
British Columbia (Laface)	0	0	1	0	1	0	1	0	X	X	3

Sheet F	1	2	3	4	5	6	7	8	9	10	Final
Ontario (Turcotte)	0	1	0	2	0	1	0	0	2	X	6
New Brunswick (Mabey)	2	0	1	0	3	0	2	2	0	X	10

==== Draw 9 ====
Sheet A	1	2	3	4	5	6	7	8	9	10	Final
Manitoba (Grove)	2	1	0	2	1	1	0	2	X	X	9
Northwest Territories/Yukon (Strang)	0	0	1	0	0	0	1	0	X	X	2

Sheet C	1	2	3	4	5	6	7	8	9	10	11	Final
Northern Ontario (Coulter)	1	0	0	3	1	0	1	0	1	1	0	8
Quebec (Aitken)	0	1	0	0	0	4	0	3	0	0	1	9

Sheet E	1	2	3	4	5	6	7	8	9	10	Final
Saskatchewan (Bryden)	2	0	2	0	1	0	1	1	0	1	8
Newfoundland (Ryan)	0	3	0	1	0	2	0	0	1	0	7

==== Draw 10 ====
Sheet A	1	2	3	4	5	6	7	8	9	10	Final
British Columbia (Laface)	0	1	0	1	0	1	0	0	2	2	7
Ontario (Turcotte)	0	0	3	0	0	0	1	1	0	0	5

Sheet C	1	2	3	4	5	6	7	8	9	10	Final
Prince Edward Island (Trainor)	0	2	0	1	0	0	1	0	0	X	4
Nova Scotia (Goulden)	0	0	2	0	2	0	0	0	4	X	8

Sheet E	1	2	3	4	5	6	7	8	9	10	Final
New Brunswick (Mabey)	0	0	0	0	0	0	X	X	X	X	0
Alberta (Pankoski)	1	1	2	1	1	1	X	X	X	X	7

==== Draw 11 ====
Sheet A	1	2	3	4	5	6	7	8	9	10	Final
New Brunswick (Mabey)	1	0	0	1	0	0	2	0	0	X	4
Saskatchewan (Bryden)	0	1	1	0	1	1	0	4	1	X	9

Sheet B	1	2	3	4	5	6	7	8	9	10	Final
Nova Scotia (Goulden)	3	0	2	0	0	0	2	0	0	0	7
Northwest Territories/Yukon (Strang)	0	2	0	2	1	1	0	0	0	2	8

Sheet C	1	2	3	4	5	6	7	8	9	10	Final
British Columbia (Laface)	1	0	2	0	0	2	0	1	0	3	9
Newfoundland (Ryan)	0	2	0	1	0	0	1	0	0	0	4

Sheet D	1	2	3	4	5	6	7	8	9	10	Final
Ontario (Turcotte)	0	0	1	0	2	2	0	2	0	X	7
Quebec (Aitken)	0	0	0	1	0	0	1	0	1	X	3

Sheet E	1	2	3	4	5	6	7	8	9	10	11	Final
Prince Edward Island (Trainor)	3	1	1	0	0	2	0	0	1	0	1	9
Manitoba (Grove)	0	0	0	2	1	0	2	1	0	2	0	8

Sheet F	1	2	3	4	5	6	7	8	9	10	11	Final
Alberta (Pankoski)	3	0	1	0	1	0	0	3	0	0	0	8
Northern Ontario (Coulter)	0	1	0	1	0	3	1	0	1	1	1	9

==== Draw 12 ====
Sheet A	1	2	3	4	5	6	7	8	9	10	Final
Northwest Territories/Yukon (Strang)	2	0	0	1	0	1	0	1	0	0	5
Ontario (Turcotte)	0	1	0	0	1	0	1	0	2	1	6

Sheet B	1	2	3	4	5	6	7	8	9	10	Final
Saskatchewan (Bryden)	0	1	0	2	0	0	0	0	1	0	4
Prince Edward Island (Trainor)	0	0	2	0	0	0	0	1	0	2	5

Sheet C	1	2	3	4	5	6	7	8	9	10	Final
Northern Ontario (Coulter)	2	1	1	2	2	3	X	X	X	X	11
New Brunswick (Mabey)	0	0	0	0	0	0	X	X	X	X	0

Sheet D	1	2	3	4	5	6	7	8	9	10	11	Final
Newfoundland (Ryan)	3	0	0	2	0	1	0	1	2	0	1	10
Nova Scotia (Goulden)	0	1	1	0	3	0	1	0	0	3	0	9

Sheet E	1	2	3	4	5	6	7	8	9	10	Final
Quebec (Aitken)	5	0	0	0	0	1	2	0	2	X	10
Alberta (Pankoski)	0	1	1	1	2	0	0	2	0	X	7

Sheet F	1	2	3	4	5	6	7	8	9	10	Final
Manitoba (Grove)	1	1	0	0	2	0	2	0	2	1	9
British Columbia (Laface)	0	0	1	1	0	2	0	3	0	0	7

==== Draw 13 ====
Sheet A	1	2	3	4	5	6	7	8	9	10	Final
Prince Edward Island (Trainor)	1	0	0	0	1	0	0	1	1	1	5
Newfoundland (Ryan)	0	2	0	0	0	1	1	0	0	0	4

Sheet B	1	2	3	4	5	6	7	8	9	10	Final
Ontario (Turcotte)	0	1	0	1	0	3	0	0	1	X	6
Northern Ontario (Coulter)	0	0	1	0	1	0	1	0	0	X	3

Sheet C	1	2	3	4	5	6	7	8	9	10	Final
Nova Scotia (Goulden)	0	0	2	1	1	0	2	1	0	1	8
Manitoba (Grove)	1	1	0	0	0	4	0	0	1	0	7

Sheet D	1	2	3	4	5	6	7	8	9	10	Final
Alberta (Pankoski)	1	1	0	2	0	1	0	2	X	X	7
Saskatchewan (Bryden)	0	0	4	0	4	0	1	0	X	X	9

Sheet E	1	2	3	4	5	6	7	8	9	10	Final
British Columbia (Laface)	4	0	0	3	0	0	4	X	X	X	11
Northwest Territories/Yukon (Strang)	0	1	1	0	1	0	0	X	X	X	3

Sheet F	1	2	3	4	5	6	7	8	9	10	Final
New Brunswick (Mabey)	1	4	0	0	1	0	0	2	0	X	8
Quebec (Aitken)	0	0	1	0	0	1	1	0	2	X	5

==== Draw 14 ====
Sheet A	1	2	3	4	5	6	7	8	9	10	Final
Manitoba (Grove)	1	0	1	0	1	0	1	1	0	0	5
Alberta (Pankoski)	0	3	0	1	0	1	0	0	1	1	7

Sheet B	1	2	3	4	5	6	7	8	9	10	Final
Quebec (Aitken)	0	1	0	0	0	2	0	1	2	0	6
British Columbia (Laface)	0	0	1	1	2	0	1	0	0	2	7

Sheet C	1	2	3	4	5	6	7	8	9	10	11	Final
Saskatchewan (Bryden)	0	1	0	2	0	0	1	0	1	0	2	7
Ontario (Turcotte)	0	0	1	0	0	1	0	2	0	1	0	5

Sheet D	1	2	3	4	5	6	7	8	9	10	Final
Newfoundland (Ryan)	2	1	0	2	0	1	1	0	1	X	8
New Brunswick (Mabey)	0	0	1	0	2	0	0	2	0	X	5

Sheet E	1	2	3	4	5	6	7	8	9	10	Final
Northern Ontario (Coulter)	0	3	0	3	0	2	0	6	X	X	14
Nova Scotia (Goulden)	1	0	2	0	1	0	1	0	X	X	5

Sheet F	1	2	3	4	5	6	7	8	9	10	Final
Northwest Territories/Yukon (Strang)	1	0	0	0	1	0	0	1	1	X	4
Prince Edward Island (Trainor)	0	0	3	1	0	2	1	0	0	X	7

==== Draw 15 ====
Sheet A	1	2	3	4	5	6	7	8	9	10	Final
British Columbia (Laface)	1	0	1	0	0	2	1	0	2	X	7
Northern Ontario (Coulter)	0	0	0	0	1	0	0	1	0	X	2

Sheet B	1	2	3	4	5	6	7	8	9	10	11	Final
New Brunswick (Mabey)	1	0	2	1	0	1	0	1	0	0	1	7
Northwest Territories/Yukon (Strang)	0	1	0	0	1	0	1	0	2	1	0	6

Sheet C	1	2	3	4	5	6	7	8	9	10	Final
Alberta (Pankoski)	3	0	2	0	1	0	0	1	0	X	7
Newfoundland (Ryan)	0	1	0	1	0	0	2	0	1	X	5

Sheet D	1	2	3	4	5	6	7	8	9	10	Final
Ontario (Turcotte)	2	2	0	0	2	0	1	1	0	1	9
Manitoba (Grove)	0	0	3	0	0	1	0	0	2	0	6

Sheet E	1	2	3	4	5	6	7	8	9	10	Final
Prince Edward Island (Trainor)	2	0	0	0	0	1	1	0	4	0	8
Quebec (Aitken)	0	3	0	1	1	0	0	2	0	2	9

Sheet F	1	2	3	4	5	6	7	8	9	10	Final
Nova Scotia (Goulden)	1	0	0	1	0	1	0	1	0	X	4
Saskatchewan (Bryden)	0	1	1	0	2	0	1	0	3	X	8

==== Draw 16 ====
Sheet A	1	2	3	4	5	6	7	8	9	10	Final
Quebec (Aitken)	2	0	0	0	0	4	0	1	0	0	7
Nova Scotia (Goulden)	0	2	1	1	1	0	2	0	2	1	10

Sheet B	1	2	3	4	5	6	7	8	9	10	Final
Newfoundland (Ryan)	1	1	0	1	0	0	0	0	X	X	3
Ontario (Turcotte)	0	0	3	0	0	3	1	2	X	X	9

Sheet C	1	2	3	4	5	6	7	8	9	10	Final
Manitoba (Grove)	1	0	2	0	2	0	0	0	X	X	5
New Brunswick (Mabey)	0	1	0	3	0	1	1	5	X	X	11

Sheet D	1	2	3	4	5	6	7	8	9	10	Final
Northwest Territories/Yukon (Strang)	0	0	2	0	0	0	0	1	X	X	3
Alberta (Pankoski)	1	2	0	1	2	1	1	0	X	X	8

Sheet E	1	2	3	4	5	6	7	8	9	10	Final
Saskatchewan (Bryden)	2	0	0	1	0	0	0	2	0	0	5
British Columbia (Laface)	0	1	1	0	1	0	1	0	2	1	7

Sheet F	1	2	3	4	5	6	7	8	9	10	Final
Northern Ontario (Coulter)	3	0	2	0	0	0	2	0	0	1	8
Prince Edward Island (Trainor)	0	2	0	1	1	2	0	1	0	0	7

=== Playoffs ===
Semifinal		Final
Northern Ontario	5
Ontario	7	British Columbia	6
		Ontario	8

==== Semifinal ====
Sheet D	1	2	3	4	5	6	7	8	9	10	Final
Northern Ontario (Coulter)	0	0	1	0	2	0	2	0	0	0	5
Ontario (Turcotte)	0	2	0	2	0	1	0	0	0	2	7

Player percentages
Northern Ontario		Ontario	
Rick Elliott	83%	Steve McDermot	85%
Wayne McClelland	79%	Bob Lichti	84%
Mike Sagle	84%	Roy Weigand	79%
Mike Coulter	79%	Bob Turcotte	91%
Total	81%	Total	84%

==== Final ====
Sheet E	1	2	3	4	5	6	7	8	9	10	Final
British Columbia (Laface)	1	0	1	0	1	0	1	0	2	0	6
Ontario (Turcotte)	0	2	0	2	0	1	0	2	0	1	8

Player percentages
British Columbia		Ontario	
Barry Brown	79%	Steve McDermot	90%
John Hockey	78%	Bob Lichti	61%
Val Schwab	69%	Roy Weigand	90%
Wayne Laface	81%	Bob Turcotte	91%
Total	77%	Total	83%

== Women's ==
=== Teams ===
Province / Territory	Skip	Third	Second	Lead
Alberta	Dorenda Bailey	Arlene Sali	Sheila Frank	Dianne Woima
British Columbia	Ellen Merriam	Lorraine Jeffries	Trudy Beskau	Gail Moore
Manitoba	Carly Robinson	Joyce Thompson	Linda Heselwood	Janice Kelly
New Brunswick	Barb Hutton	Wendy Shephard	Mona Train	Loretta Cobham
Newfoundland	Sue Anne Bartlett	Cynthia Young	Marg Collingwood	Cynthia Mills
Northern Ontario	Marion Ball	Madeline Gilbart	Lynn Reid	Judith Prystanski
Nova Scotia	Audrey Ackles	Rachel Smith	Carol Gothreau	Betty Ripley
Ontario	Diane Harris	Muriel Potter	Barbara Sunderland	Laurel McKay
Prince Edward Island	Marg Nowlan	Ann Currie	Genevieve Enman	Mabel Gardiner
Quebec	Agnes Charette	Martha Don	Lois Baines	Mary Anne Robertson
Saskatchewan	Nancy Kerr	Linda Burnham	Lorna Dopson	Gertie Pick
Yukon/Northwest Territories	Evelyn Pasichnyk	Donna Sanderson	Suzanne Laberge	Bernice Broder

=== Standings ===
Locale	Skip	W	L
Saskatchewan	Nancy Kerr	9	2
Quebec	Agnes Charette	8	3
Newfoundland	Sue Anne Bartlett	8	3
Alberta	Dorenda Bailey	7	4
British Columbia	Ellen Merriam	7	4
Ontario	Diane Harris	6	5
New Brunswick	Barb Hutton	5	6
Prince Edward Island	Marg Nowlan	5	6
Nova Scotia	Audrey Ackles	4	7
Manitoba	Carly Robinson	3	8
Northern Ontario	Marion Ball	2	9
Yukon/Northwest Territories	Evelyn Pasichnyk	2	9

=== Results ===
==== Draw 1 ====
Sheet A	1	2	3	4	5	6	7	8	9	10	Final
Prince Edward Island (Nowlan)	2	0	1	1	1	0	1	2	0	X	8
Yukon/Northwest Territories (Pasichnyk)	0	1	0	0	0	1	0	0	1	X	3

Sheet C	1	2	3	4	5	6	7	8	9	10	Final
Ontario (Harris)	1	0	0	0	0	1	0	2	1	0	5
Manitoba (Robinson)	0	0	0	1	1	0	2	0	0	2	6

Sheet E	1	2	3	4	5	6	7	8	9	10	Final
Alberta (Bailey)	0	0	0	1	2	1	0	2	0	1	7
Quebec (Charette)	0	1	1	0	0	0	1	0	1	0	4

==== Draw 2 ====
Sheet A	1	2	3	4	5	6	7	8	9	10	Final
New Brunswick (Hutton)	0	3	1	0	1	1	5	X	X	X	11
Northern Ontario (Ball)	1	0	0	1	0	0	0	X	X	X	2

Sheet C	1	2	3	4	5	6	7	8	9	10	Final
Newfoundland (Bartlett)	0	3	0	1	0	0	0	1	0	X	5
Saskatchewan (Kerr)	0	0	3	0	1	1	1	0	3	X	9

Sheet E	1	2	3	4	5	6	7	8	9	10	Final
British Columbia (Merriam)	2	1	0	0	4	1	0	2	X	X	10
Nova Scotia (Ackles)	0	0	1	0	0	0	1	0	X	X	2

==== Draw 3 ====
Sheet B	1	2	3	4	5	6	7	8	9	10	Final
Quebec (Charette)	2	0	3	0	2	0	4	X	X	X	11
Manitoba (Robinson)	0	2	0	2	0	1	0	X	X	X	5

Sheet D	1	2	3	4	5	6	7	8	9	10	Final
Alberta (Bailey)	0	2	0	0	0	1	0	2	0	X	5
Yukon/Northwest Territories (Pasichnyk)	1	0	1	1	3	0	1	0	2	X	9

Sheet F	1	2	3	4	5	6	7	8	9	10	Final
Prince Edward Island (Nowlan)	2	0	2	0	0	0	0	0	0	X	4
Ontario (Harris)	0	2	0	1	1	1	0	2	4	X	11

==== Draw 4 ====
Sheet B	1	2	3	4	5	6	7	8	9	10	Final
Nova Scotia (Ackles)	2	0	2	0	0	1	0	2	0	X	7
Northern Ontario (Ball)	0	1	0	1	2	0	1	0	1	X	6

Sheet D	1	2	3	4	5	6	7	8	9	10	Final
British Columbia (Merriam)	0	0	2	0	1	0	0	1	0	X	4
Saskatchewan (Kerr)	2	1	0	2	0	1	1	0	1	X	8

Sheet F	1	2	3	4	5	6	7	8	9	10	Final
Newfoundland (Bartlett)	2	0	1	0	1	0	0	1	0	X	5
New Brunswick (Hutton)	0	3	0	2	0	2	1	0	1	X	9

==== Draw 5 ====
Sheet B	1	2	3	4	5	6	7	8	9	10	Final
Ontario (Harris)	0	0	0	2	0	2	0	2	0	0	6
Alberta (Bailey)	0	2	1	0	1	0	2	0	2	1	9

Sheet D	1	2	3	4	5	6	7	8	9	10	Final
Manitoba (Robinson)	0	2	0	0	2	0	0	1	X	X	5
Prince Edward Island (Nowlan)	3	0	2	1	0	2	2	0	X	X	10

Sheet F	1	2	3	4	5	6	7	8	9	10	Final
Yukon/Northwest Territories (Pasichnyk)	1	0	0	0	0	0	0	X	X	X	1
Quebec (Charette)	0	3	0	2	1	2	4	X	X	X	12

==== Draw 6 ====
Sheet B	1	2	3	4	5	6	7	8	9	10	11	Final
New Brunswick (Hutton)	2	0	5	1	0	2	0	0	0	0	0	10
British Columbia (Merriam)	0	2	0	0	1	0	2	1	2	2	1	11

Sheet D	1	2	3	4	5	6	7	8	9	10	Final
Northern Ontario (Ball)	1	0	0	2	0	2	0	1	0	X	6
Newfoundland (Bartlett)	0	2	1	0	2	0	2	0	5	X	12

Sheet F	1	2	3	4	5	6	7	8	9	10	Final
Saskatchewan (Kerr)	2	0	1	0	1	1	0	4	2	X	11
Nova Scotia (Ackles)	0	1	0	1	0	0	1	0	0	X	3

==== Draw 7 ====
Sheet A	1	2	3	4	5	6	7	8	9	10	Final
Nova Scotia (Ackles)	1	0	1	0	0	2	1	1	1	X	7
New Brunswick (Hutton)	0	1	0	0	2	0	0	0	0	X	3

Sheet C	1	2	3	4	5	6	7	8	9	10	Final
British Columbia (Merriam)	1	0	0	0	2	0	0	3	0	0	6
Newfoundland (Bartlett)	0	1	0	3	0	2	1	0	1	1	9

Sheet E	1	2	3	4	5	6	7	8	9	10	Final
Saskatchewan (Kerr)	1	0	3	0	1	2	0	3	X	X	10
Northern Ontario (Ball)	0	1	0	2	0	0	1	0	X	X	4

==== Draw 8 ====
Sheet A	1	2	3	4	5	6	7	8	9	10	11	Final
Quebec (Charette)	1	0	0	4	0	0	0	0	1	0	0	6
Ontario (Harris)	0	1	3	0	0	0	0	1	0	1	1	7

Sheet C	1	2	3	4	5	6	7	8	9	10	Final
Yukon/Northwest Territories (Pasichnyk)	1	0	1	1	0	1	0	1	X	X	5
Manitoba (Robinson)	0	5	0	0	4	0	2	0	X	X	11

Sheet E	1	2	3	4	5	6	7	8	9	10	Final
Alberta (Bailey)	1	0	0	6	0	3	3	X	X	X	13
Prince Edward Island (Nowlan)	0	2	1	0	1	0	0	X	X	X	4

==== Draw 9 ====
Sheet B	1	2	3	4	5	6	7	8	9	10	Final
Newfoundland (Bartlett)	0	4	0	4	0	1	0	0	2	X	11
Nova Scotia (Ackles)	1	0	2	0	1	0	1	1	0	X	6

Sheet D	1	2	3	4	5	6	7	8	9	10	Final
New Brunswick (Hutton)	1	0	0	1	1	0	0	0	2	X	5
Saskatchewan (Kerr)	0	2	0	0	0	2	3	0	0	X	7

Sheet F	1	2	3	4	5	6	7	8	9	10	Final
Northern Ontario (Ball)	1	0	0	2	0	0	0	0	X	X	3
British Columbia (Merriam)	0	1	1	0	3	2	1	1	X	X	9

==== Draw 10 ====
Sheet B	1	2	3	4	5	6	7	8	9	10	Final
Ontario (Harris)	0	3	0	3	0	3	0	4	X	X	13
Yukon/Northwest Territories (Pasichnyk)	1	0	1	0	2	0	2	0	X	X	6

Sheet D	1	2	3	4	5	6	7	8	9	10	Final
Prince Edward Island (Nowlan)	0	0	1	0	1	0	0	1	0	X	3
Quebec (Charette)	1	1	0	1	0	1	0	0	3	X	7

Sheet F	1	2	3	4	5	6	7	8	9	10	Final
Manitoba (Robinson)	0	1	0	1	2	0	0	1	1	0	6
Alberta (Bailey)	1	0	2	0	0	2	1	0	0	4	10

==== Draw 11 ====
Sheet A	1	2	3	4	5	6	7	8	9	10	Final
Yukon/Northwest Territories (Pasichnyk)	0	3	0	0	1	0	0	0	X	X	4
British Columbia (Merriam)	2	0	2	1	0	2	2	2	X	X	11

Sheet B	1	2	3	4	5	6	7	8	9	10	Final
Manitoba (Robinson)	0	3	0	0	0	1	2	0	X	X	6
Saskatchewan (Kerr)	1	0	3	2	2	0	0	3	X	X	11

Sheet C	1	2	3	4	5	6	7	8	9	10	Final
Alberta (Bailey)	0	0	0	1	0	0	2	2	0	X	5
Nova Scotia (Ackles)	3	1	1	0	2	1	0	0	2	X	10

Sheet D	1	2	3	4	5	6	7	8	9	10	Final
Ontario (Harris)	2	2	0	0	3	0	2	3	X	X	12
Northern Ontario (Ball)	0	0	2	1	0	2	0	0	X	X	5

Sheet E	1	2	3	4	5	6	7	8	9	10	Final
Quebec (Charette)	0	2	0	3	0	2	0	0	2	X	9
Newfoundland (Bartlett)	0	0	0	0	1	0	2	1	0	X	4

Sheet F	1	2	3	4	5	6	7	8	9	10	Final
Prince Edward Island (Nowlan)	0	0	3	0	1	1	0	1	1	X	7
New Brunswick (Hutton)	3	3	0	3	0	0	1	0	0	X	10

==== Draw 12 ====
Sheet A	1	2	3	4	5	6	7	8	9	10	Final
New Brunswick (Hutton)	3	0	0	1	0	0	1	1	0	X	6
Ontario (Harris)	0	1	1	0	0	0	0	0	1	X	3

Sheet B	1	2	3	4	5	6	7	8	9	10	Final
Newfoundland (Bartlett)	2	3	0	2	4	0	0	3	X	X	14
Prince Edward Island (Nowlan)	0	0	1	0	0	1	3	0	X	X	5

Sheet C	1	2	3	4	5	6	7	8	9	10	Final
Saskatchewan (Kerr)	0	0	2	1	0	0	4	0	0	X	7
Yukon/Northwest Territories (Pasichnyk)	0	0	0	0	0	1	0	2	1	X	4

Sheet D	1	2	3	4	5	6	7	8	9	10	Final
Nova Scotia (Ackles)	1	0	0	0	1	0	0	0	1	X	3
Quebec (Charette)	0	1	0	1	0	2	1	1	0	X	6

Sheet E	1	2	3	4	5	6	7	8	9	10	Final
Northern Ontario (Ball)	0	0	0	0	1	1	1	1	1	2	7
Manitoba (Robinson)	1	0	1	1	0	0	0	0	0	0	3

Sheet F	1	2	3	4	5	6	7	8	9	10	Final
British Columbia (Merriam)	1	0	0	2	2	0	0	0	1	0	6
Alberta (Bailey)	0	1	3	0	0	1	0	1	0	1	7

==== Draw 13 ====
Sheet A	1	2	3	4	5	6	7	8	9	10	Final
Alberta (Bailey)	1	0	0	1	2	1	0	1	0	X	6
Newfoundland (Bartlett)	0	3	3	0	0	0	3	0	2	X	11

Sheet B	1	2	3	4	5	6	7	8	9	10	Final
Yukon/Northwest Territories (Pasichnyk)	0	2	0	2	0	0	0	X	X	X	4
Northern Ontario (Ball)	4	0	6	0	0	1	2	X	X	X	13

Sheet C	1	2	3	4	5	6	7	8	9	10	Final
Quebec (Charette)	1	0	0	0	1	1	0	3	1	X	7
New Brunswick (Hutton)	0	1	1	0	0	0	1	0	0	X	3

Sheet D	1	2	3	4	5	6	7	8	9	10	Final
Manitoba (Robinson)	1	0	0	1	0	0	0	1	X	X	3
British Columbia (Merriam)	0	2	0	0	0	5	1	0	X	X	8

Sheet E	1	2	3	4	5	6	7	8	9	10	Final
Prince Edward Island (Nowlan)	2	0	0	2	0	0	2	2	1	X	9
Nova Scotia (Ackles)	0	1	1	0	1	1	0	0	0	X	4

Sheet F	1	2	3	4	5	6	7	8	9	10	Final
Ontario (Harris)	0	1	0	3	0	5	0	1	0	X	10
Saskatchewan (Kerr)	1	0	4	0	2	0	1	0	1	X	9

==== Draw 14 ====
Sheet A	1	2	3	4	5	6	7	8	9	10	Final
Nova Scotia (Ackles)	0	0	1	0	0	2	0	1	2	0	6
Manitoba (Robinson)	1	0	0	0	2	0	1	0	0	0	4

Sheet B	1	2	3	4	5	6	7	8	9	10	Final
New Brunswick (Hutton)	0	1	2	0	2	0	0	0	1	1	7
Alberta (Bailey)	1	0	0	2	0	4	1	1	0	0	9

Sheet C	1	2	3	4	5	6	7	8	9	10	Final
Saskatchewan (Kerr)	2	2	0	1	1	1	0	4	X	X	11
Prince Edward Island (Nowlan)	0	0	1	0	0	0	1	0	X	X	2

Sheet D	1	2	3	4	5	6	7	8	9	10	Final
Newfoundland (Bartlett)	2	1	4	3	2	0	X	X	X	X	12
Yukon/Northwest Territories (Pasichnyk)	0	0	0	0	0	1	X	X	X	X	1

Sheet E	1	2	3	4	5	6	7	8	9	10	Final
British Columbia (Merriam)	1	0	1	0	0	2	0	1	1	1	7
Ontario (Harris)	0	1	0	2	1	0	2	0	0	0	6

Sheet F	1	2	3	4	5	6	7	8	9	10	Final
Northern Ontario (Ball)	1	2	1	0	1	0	1	1	0	0	7
Quebec (Charette)	0	0	0	2	0	3	0	0	2	3	10

==== Draw 15 ====
Sheet A	1	2	3	4	5	6	7	8	9	10	Final
Prince Edward Island (Nowlan)	0	1	0	1	0	1	0	1	1	2	7
British Columbia (Merriam)	1	0	2	0	1	0	2	0	0	0	6

Sheet B	1	2	3	4	5	6	7	8	9	10	Final
Quebec (Charette)	2	0	0	1	0	3	0	2	0	X	8
Saskatchewan (Kerr)	0	0	1	0	1	0	2	0	1	X	5

Sheet C	1	2	3	4	5	6	7	8	9	10	Final
Alberta (Bailey)	0	3	0	3	2	0	2	X	X	X	10
Northern Ontario (Ball)	1	0	1	0	0	1	0	X	X	X	3

Sheet D	1	2	3	4	5	6	7	8	9	10	Final
Ontario (Harris)	0	2	0	1	0	0	2	0	0	1	6
Nova Scotia (Ackles)	0	0	2	0	0	1	0	2	0	0	5

Sheet E	1	2	3	4	5	6	7	8	9	10	Final
Yukon/Northwest Territories (Pasichnyk)	1	0	0	1	1	0	0	0	X	X	3
New Brunswick (Hutton)	0	2	2	0	0	1	3	3	X	X	11

Sheet F	1	2	3	4	5	6	7	8	9	10	Final
Manitoba (Robinson)	0	1	0	2	0	0	1	0	0	0	4
Newfoundland (Bartlett)	0	0	1	0	0	1	0	1	1	1	5

==== Draw 16 ====
Sheet A	1	2	3	4	5	6	7	8	9	10	Final
Saskatchewan (Kerr)	1	3	0	1	1	0	3	1	0	X	10
Alberta (Bailey)	0	0	1	0	0	2	0	0	1	X	4

Sheet B	1	2	3	4	5	6	7	8	9	10	Final
Northern Ontario (Ball)	1	2	0	1	0	0	1	0	1	X	5
Prince Edward Island (Nowlan)	0	0	3	0	2	2	0	2	0	X	9

Sheet C	1	2	3	4	5	6	7	8	9	10	Final
British Columbia (Merriam)	2	0	0	3	1	0	0	3	X	X	9
Quebec (Charette)	0	0	1	0	0	1	0	0	X	X	2

Sheet D	1	2	3	4	5	6	7	8	9	10	Final
New Brunswick (Hutton)	1	1	2	1	0	0	1	0	0	0	6
Manitoba (Robinson)	0	0	0	0	2	1	0	2	1	2	8

Sheet E	1	2	3	4	5	6	7	8	9	10	Final
Newfoundland (Bartlett)	0	0	0	1	1	0	0	1	2	X	5
Ontario (Harris)	0	0	0	0	0	1	0	0	0	X	1

Sheet F	1	2	3	4	5	6	7	8	9	10	11	Final
Nova Scotia (Ackles)	2	0	1	0	0	0	2	0	1	1	0	7
Yukon/Northwest Territories (Pasichnyk)	0	2	0	2	0	2	0	1	0	0	1	8

=== Playoffs ===
Semifinal		Final
Newfoundland	3
Quebec	9	Saskatchewan	3
		Quebec	4

==== Semifinal ====
Sheet B	1	2	3	4	5	6	7	8	9	10	Final
Newfoundland (Bartlett)	0	1	0	1	0	0	0	1	X	X	3
Quebec (Charette)	1	0	3	0	1	1	3	0	X	X	9

Player percentages
Newfoundland		Quebec	
Cynthia Mills	67%	Mary Anne Robertson	70%
Marg Collingwood	61%	Lois Baines	77%
Cynthia Young	48%	Martha Don	63%
Sue Anne Bartlett	78%	Agnes Charette	77%
Total	64%	Total	71%

==== Final ====
Sheet E	1	2	3	4	5	6	7	8	9	10	Final
Saskatchewan (Kerr)	1	0	0	1	0	0	1	0	0	0	3
Quebec (Charette)	0	1	0	0	0	2	0	1	0	0	4

Player percentages
Saskatchewan		Quebec	
Gertie Pick	78%	Mary Anne Robertson	74%
Lorna Dopson	70%	Lois Baines	57%
Linda Burnham	70%	Martha Don	90%
Nancy Kerr	75%	Agnes Charette	82%
Total	73%	Total	76%
