= Prairie South School Division =

School district in Saskatchewan, Canada

Location
- 15 Thatcher Drive East; Moose Jaw, SK S6J 1L8 Canada

District information
- Chair of the board: Giselle Wilson
- Director of education: Ryana Boughen
- Schools: 40

Students and staff
- Students: 7,358 (2025)

Other information
- Website: www.prairiesouth.ca

Prairie South School Division #210 (effective January 1, 2006, due to provincial amalgamations) comprises 40 schools in the west-central part of Saskatchewan. This division has an enrollment of about 7,300 students.

Prairie South School Division is composed of the former Moose Jaw Public School Division, Thunder Creek School Division, Borderland School Division, Golden Plains School Division, Red Coat Trails, and portions of Davidson School Division and Herbert School Division.

In May 2010, the division announced that Jeff Finell would become director of education when the original director, Brenda Edwards, retired in August 2010.

Current Director of Education: Ryan Boughen

== Superintendents ==
- Bernie Girardin
- Lori Meyer
- Ryan Boughen
- Barb Compton
- Derrick Huschi
- Kim Novak

== Schools ==
School	Grades
Assiniboia 7th Avenue School	Preschool-4
Assiniboia Composite High School	9–12
Assiniboia Elementary School	5–8
Avonlea School	K-12
Baildon Colony School	K-10
Belle Plaine Colony School	K-12
Bengough School	K-12
Caronport Elementary School	K-8
Caronport High School	9–12
Central Butte School	K-12
Central Collegiate	9–12
Chaplin School	K-12
Cornerstone Christian School (Moose Jaw)	K-12
Coronach School	K-12
Craik School	K-12
Empire Community School	Preschool-8
Eyebrow School	K-12
Glentworth School	K-12
Gravelbourg Elementary School	Preschool-7
Gravelbourg High School	8–12
Huron Colony School	K-10
John Chisholm Alternate School	
Kincaid Central School	K-12
King George School	Preschool-8
Lafleche Central School	K-12
Lindale School	K-8
Mankota School	K-12
Mortlach School	K-12
Mossbank School	K-12
Palliser Heights School	Preschool-8
Peacock Collegiate	9–12
Prairie South Virtual School	9–12
Prince Arthur Community School	Preschool-8
Riverview Collegiate Institute	9–12
Rockglen School	K-12
Rose Valley Colony School	K-10
Rouleau School	K-12
Sunningdale School (Moose Jaw)	Preschool-8
Vanguard Colony School	K-10
Westmount School	Preschool-8
William Grayson School	Preschool-8
