= 1975 Macdonald Lassies Championship =

Canadian women's curling championship

- Host city: Moncton, New Brunswick
- Arena: Moncton Coliseum
- Dates: February 23–28
- Winner: Quebec
- Curling club: Montreal Caledonia CC, Westmount
- Skip: Lee Tobin
- Third: Marilyn McNeil
- Second: Michelle Garneau
- Lead: Laurie Ross
- Finalist: Saskatchewan (Marjorie Mitchell)

The 1975 Macdonald Lassies Championship, the Canadian women's curling championship was held February 23 to 28, 1975 at the Moncton Coliseum in Moncton, New Brunswick.

Quebec and Saskatchewan both finished round robin play tied for first with 7–2 records, necessitating a tiebreaker playoff between the two teams. Team Quebec, who was skipped by Lee Tobin defeated Saskatchewan in the tiebreaker 7–5 to capture the championship, preventing Saskatchewan from winning their seventh straight title. To date, this is Quebec's only women's championship. It was also only the second time that a team from Eastern Canada had won the championship, joining New Brunswick who won in 1963.

== Teams ==
The teams are listed as follows:

Alberta	British Columbia	Manitoba	New Brunswick	Newfoundland
Medicine Hat CC, Medicine Hat Skip: Sharon Grigg; Third: Betty Booth; Second: Gail Frandsen; Lead: Karen Love	Kelowna Ladies CC, Kelowna Skip: Marion Radcliffe; Third: Karen Lovdahl; Second: Phyliss McCrady; Lead: Darlene Tucker	Souris Evening Ladies CC, Souris Skip: Joan Mogk; Third: Jean Moffatt; Second: Betty Devine; Lead: Karen Anderson	Thistle CC, Saint John Skip: Ivy Lord; Third: Dorothy Garey; Second: Clarie Olsen; Lead: Helen Cook	Bally Haly G&CC, St. John's Skip: Gail Hiscock; Third: Elsie May; Second: Ruby Henry; Lead: Ruth Carter
Nova Scotia	Ontario	Prince Edward Island	Quebec	Saskatchewan
Halifax CC, Halifax Skip: Phyliss MacDonald; Third: Jo Sutherland; Second: Joan Renouf; Lead: Alice Shakespere	Ivanhoe CC, London Skip: Bea Cole; Third: Brenda Essery; Second: Jane Chalmers; Lead: Deanne Buchan	Charlottetown CC, Charlottetown Skip: Diane Blanchard; Third: Barbara McCurdy; Second: Jean Court; Lead: Sharon MacEwen	Montreal Caledonia CC, Westmount Skip: Lee Tobin; Third: Marilyn McNeil; Second: Michelle Garneau; Lead: Laurie Ross	Caledonian Ladies CC, Regina Skip: Marjorie Mitchell; Third: Kenda Richards; Second: Nancy Kerr; Lead: Florence Sanna

== Map of teams ==
Provincial Winners

== Round Robin Standings ==
Final Round Robin standings

Key
Teams to Tiebreaker

Province	Skip	W	L	PF	PA
Quebec	Lee Tobin	7	2	76	54
Saskatchewan	Marjorie Mitchell	7	2	78	63
Alberta	Sharon Grigg	6	3	63	50
British Columbia	Marion Radcliffe	6	3	81	56
Manitoba	Joan Mogk	5	4	69	59
Newfoundland	Gail Hiscock	4	5	68	73
Ontario	Bea Cole	3	6	65	75
Prince Edward Island	Diane Blanchard	3	6	63	72
New Brunswick	Ivy Lord	2	7	49	88
Nova Scotia	Phyliss MacDonald	2	7	54	76

== Round Robin results ==
=== Draw 1 ===
Team	1	2	3	4	5	6	7	8	9	10	Final
Manitoba (Mogk)	0	0	2	0	3	1	3	0	1	X	10
Quebec (Tobin)	1	0	0	1	0	0	0	4	0	X	6

Team	1	2	3	4	5	6	7	8	9	10	Final
Nova Scotia (MacDonald)	0	1	1	0	1	2	0	1	1	1	8
Saskatchewan (Mitchell)	3	0	0	4	0	0	2	0	0	0	9

Team	1	2	3	4	5	6	7	8	9	10	Final
British Columbia (Radcliffe)	0	1	0	1	0	1	0	1	1	1	6
Alberta (Grigg)	3	0	1	0	1	0	2	0	0	0	7

Team	1	2	3	4	5	6	7	8	9	10	Final
Ontario (Cole)	1	3	1	0	1	0	1	0	1	2	10
New Brunswick (Lord)	0	0	0	1	0	3	0	1	0	0	5

Team	1	2	3	4	5	6	7	8	9	10	Final
Newfoundland (Hiscock)	1	1	0	0	3	1	1	0	1	2	10
Prince Edward Island (Blanchard)	0	0	2	1	0	0	0	2	0	0	5

=== Draw 2 ===
Team	1	2	3	4	5	6	7	8	9	10	Final
New Brunswick (Lord)	3	0	0	0	0	0	1	2	0	2	8
Prince Edward Island (Blanchard)	0	1	1	2	0	1	0	0	1	0	6

Team	1	2	3	4	5	6	7	8	9	10	Final
Manitoba (Mogk)	1	0	0	0	0	0	2	0	0	X	3
British Columbia (Radcliffe)	0	1	1	3	1	1	0	1	1	X	9

Team	1	2	3	4	5	6	7	8	9	10	Final
Newfoundland (Hiscock)	0	0	0	0	2	1	1	0	2	0	6
Saskatchewan (Mitchell)	2	1	0	2	0	0	0	2	0	2	9

Team	1	2	3	4	5	6	7	8	9	10	Final
Quebec (Tobin)	0	4	0	0	1	0	0	1	1	X	7
Alberta (Grigg)	1	0	2	1	0	0	1	0	0	X	5

Team	1	2	3	4	5	6	7	8	9	10	Final
Nova Scotia (MacDonald)	0	1	1	0	0	2	0	2	0	2	8
Ontario (Cole)	2	0	0	2	0	0	1	0	1	0	6

=== Draw 3 ===
Team	1	2	3	4	5	6	7	8	9	10	Final
Alberta (Grigg)	0	0	4	1	0	0	1	5	3	X	14
New Brunswick (Lord)	1	2	0	0	2	1	0	0	0	X	6

Team	1	2	3	4	5	6	7	8	9	10	Final
Newfoundland (Hiscock)	2	0	0	0	1	0	1	0	0	X	4
Quebec (Tobin)	0	1	2	1	0	2	0	3	3	X	12

Team	1	2	3	4	5	6	7	8	9	10	Final
Ontario (Cole)	1	0	0	1	0	3	2	0	0	0	7
Manitoba (Mogk)	0	1	1	0	1	0	0	1	1	4	9

Team	1	2	3	4	5	6	7	8	9	10	Final
British Columbia (Radcliffe)	0	1	0	1	0	4	0	0	0	X	6
Saskatchewan (Mitchell)	1	0	3	0	1	0	3	2	2	X	12

Team	1	2	3	4	5	6	7	8	9	10	Final
Nova Scotia (MacDonald)	0	1	0	0	1	0	2	1	2	1	8
Prince Edward Island (Blanchard)	2	0	2	1	0	2	0	0	0	0	7

=== Draw 4 ===
Team	1	2	3	4	5	6	7	8	9	10	Final
New Brunswick (Lord)	0	0	0	0	1	1	0	1	0	X	3
British Columbia (Radcliffe)	2	1	1	4	0	0	2	0	4	X	14

Team	1	2	3	4	5	6	7	8	9	10	Final
Manitoba (Mogk)	0	0	0	0	0	1	1	0	1	0	3
Alberta (Grigg)	1	0	0	0	1	0	0	1	0	2	5

Team	1	2	3	4	5	6	7	8	9	10	Final
Prince Edward Island (Blanchard)	0	0	1	0	1	0	1	0	2	X	5
Saskatchewan (Mitchell)	2	1	0	3	0	1	0	1	0	X	8

Team	1	2	3	4	5	6	7	8	9	10	11	Final
Quebec (Tobin)	0	1	0	0	2	2	1	1	0	0	1	8
Ontario (Cole)	3	0	1	1	0	0	0	0	1	1	0	7

Team	1	2	3	4	5	6	7	8	9	10	Final
Newfoundland (Hiscock)	2	0	2	1	1	0	1	0	0	1	8
Nova Scotia (MacDonald)	0	3	0	0	0	1	0	1	1	0	6

=== Draw 5 ===
Team	1	2	3	4	5	6	7	8	9	10	Final
New Brunswick (Lord)	0	1	2	0	1	0	1	0	0	X	5
Newfoundland (Hiscock)	1	0	0	5	0	3	0	1	2	X	12

Team	1	2	3	4	5	6	7	8	9	10	Final
Saskatchewan (Mitchell)	1	0	3	0	4	2	1	0	X	X	11
Ontario (Cole)	0	3	0	1	0	0	0	2	X	X	6

Team	1	2	3	4	5	6	7	8	9	10	Final
Manitoba (Mogk)	0	2	0	1	0	1	0	0	4	0	8
Prince Edward Island (Blanchard)	2	0	1	0	3	0	0	1	0	2	9

Team	1	2	3	4	5	6	7	8	9	10	Final
British Columbia (Radcliffe)	1	0	3	0	1	0	2	0	2	X	9
Quebec (Tobin)	0	1	0	1	0	1	0	1	0	X	4

Team	1	2	3	4	5	6	7	8	9	10	Final
Alberta (Grigg)	0	2	2	0	1	1	2	2	0	X	10
Nova Scotia (MacDonald)	1	0	0	1	0	0	0	0	0	X	2

=== Draw 6 ===
Team	1	2	3	4	5	6	7	8	9	10	Final
Saskatchewan (Mitchell)	0	1	0	0	0	3	0	3	0	3	10
New Brunswick (Lord)	2	0	1	1	2	0	1	0	1	0	8

Team	1	2	3	4	5	6	7	8	9	10	Final
Alberta (Grigg)	1	0	2	0	1	0	1	0	0	1	6
Newfoundland (Hiscock)	0	1	0	2	0	1	0	1	0	0	5

Team	1	2	3	4	5	6	7	8	9	10	Final
British Columbia (Radcliffe)	2	1	0	1	3	0	1	0	4	X	12
Ontario (Cole)	0	0	2	0	0	2	0	1	0	X	5

Team	1	2	3	4	5	6	7	8	9	10	Final
Nova Scotia (MacDonald)	1	0	1	0	2	0	1	0	0	X	5
Manitoba (Mogk)	0	2	0	1	0	4	0	1	3	X	11

Team	1	2	3	4	5	6	7	8	9	10	Final
Quebec (Tobin)	0	2	0	0	0	2	3	0	5	X	12
Prince Edward Island (Blanchard)	1	0	0	3	0	0	0	1	0	X	5

=== Draw 7 ===
Team	1	2	3	4	5	6	7	8	9	10	Final
Saskatchewan (Mitchell)	0	0	0	3	0	0	0	1	0	0	4
Alberta (Grigg)	0	2	1	0	0	1	0	0	1	2	7

Team	1	2	3	4	5	6	7	8	9	10	Final
British Columbia (Radcliffe)	3	0	2	0	2	0	2	0	3	X	12
Newfoundland (Hiscock)	0	2	0	1	0	1	0	1	0	X	5

Team	1	2	3	4	5	6	7	8	9	10	Final
Quebec (Tobin)	0	0	0	2	0	2	1	0	0	2	7
Nova Scotia (MacDonald)	1	1	1	0	1	0	0	1	0	0	5

Team	1	2	3	4	5	6	7	8	9	10	Final
Prince Edward Island (Blanchard)	0	0	3	0	0	1	0	1	2	X	7
Ontario (Cole)	1	1	0	2	1	0	4	0	0	X	9

Team	1	2	3	4	5	6	7	8	9	10	Final
Manitoba (Mogk)	1	0	2	1	0	2	1	1	0	X	8
New Brunswick (Lord)	0	1	0	0	1	0	0	0	1	X	3

=== Draw 8 ===
Team	1	2	3	4	5	6	7	8	9	10	Final
British Columbia (Radcliffe)	0	1	0	0	1	0	2	0	0	0	4
Prince Edward Island (Blanchard)	0	0	1	2	0	3	0	1	0	2	9

Team	1	2	3	4	5	6	7	8	9	10	Final
Alberta (Grigg)	0	1	0	0	1	0	2	0	0	X	4
Ontario (Cole)	1	0	0	2	0	1	0	1	2	X	7

Team	1	2	3	4	5	6	7	8	9	10	Final
Newfoundland (Hiscock)	0	0	2	0	1	0	2	2	0	X	7
Manitoba (Mogk)	1	3	0	4	0	1	0	0	1	X	10

Team	1	2	3	4	5	6	7	8	9	10	Final
Nova Scotia (MacDonald)	1	0	1	0	0	0	1	0	1	X	4
New Brunswick (Lord)	0	1	0	1	2	3	0	2	0	X	9

Team	1	2	3	4	5	6	7	8	9	10	11	Final
Quebec (Tobin)	2	2	0	1	0	1	0	0	1	0	3	10
Saskatchewan (Mitchell)	0	0	3	0	1	0	1	1	0	1	0	7

=== Draw 9 ===
Team	1	2	3	4	5	6	7	8	9	10	Final
Newfoundland (Hiscock)	0	5	0	1	0	2	1	0	1	1	11
Ontario (Cole)	2	0	2	0	2	0	0	2	0	0	8

Team	1	2	3	4	5	6	7	8	9	10	Final
New Brunswick (Lord)	1	0	0	0	0	0	1	0	X	X	2
Quebec (Tobin)	0	5	1	1	1	1	0	1	X	X	10

Team	1	2	3	4	5	6	7	8	9	10	Final
Alberta (Grigg)	0	1	0	3	1	0	0	0	0	X	5
Prince Edward Island (Blanchard)	1	0	3	0	0	2	1	1	2	X	10

Team	1	2	3	4	5	6	7	8	9	10	Final
Saskatchewan (Mitchell)	2	0	3	0	2	0	0	0	0	1	8
Manitoba (Mogk)	0	1	0	1	0	4	0	0	1	0	7

Team	1	2	3	4	5	6	7	8	9	10	Final
Nova Scotia (MacDonald)	2	0	0	0	3	0	2	0	0	1	8
British Columbia (Radcliffe)	0	1	3	1	0	2	0	1	1	0	9

== Tiebreaker ==
Team	1	2	3	4	5	6	7	8	9	10	Final
Saskatchewan (Mitchell)	0	3	0	1	0	0	1	0	0	X	5
Quebec (Tobin)	1	0	1	0	2	1	0	2	0	X	7
