= Lee Tobin =

Canadian curler

Medal record

Curling

Macdonald Lassies Championship
Gold medal – first place	1975 Moncton	

Lee "Little Mouse" Tobin (born 1922 as Eileen Herdman; died January 3, 1996, in Vancouver) was a Canadian curler. A member of the Canadian Curling Hall of Fame, she remains the only skip to lead Quebec to a national women's curling championship, having won the 1975 Macdonald Lassies Championship.

== Curling career ==
Representing Westmount's Caledonia Curling Club, Tobin won her first Quebec women's championship in 1970, defeating Pointe Claire's Shirley Bradford in a tie-breaker playoff, after having been tied in first with them in the standings at a 5–2 record. Her team of Michelle Garneau, Perry Landrigan and Joy Sjare was put together just before playdowns that season. The team represented Quebec at the 1970 Canadian Ladies Curling Association Championship, where they finished with a 6–3 record, tied four fourth place.

The Tobin rink had less success in 1971, going 3–3 at provincials, and had to cancel their final match due to Tobin suffering a leg injury.

Tobin, with teammates Pat Haslam, Marilyn Hone and Garneau won a second Quebec provincial title in 1972. The Caledonia rink easily swept through the round robin tournament, going undefeated with a 7–0 record. The team represented Quebec at the 1972 Macdonald Lassies Championship, where Tobin once again finished in fourth place with a 6–3 record.

Tobin won a third Quebec provincial title in 1973 with teammates Fran Collison, Hone and Garneau. The team went 6–1 at the Quebec championship, losing just one game against Raymonde Messier of St. Hilaire. Representing Quebec, the team had less success at the 1973 Macdonald Lassies Championship, finishing with a 3–6 record (7th place).

In 1974, Tobin missed out on a third-straight provincial title, finishing with a 5–2 record at that year's provincial Lassie. That record was good enough for third place in the province.

After her defeat in 1974, Tobin considered retiring from competitive curling. However, she came back roaring in 1975, winning her fourth provincial title in a tiebreaker against Messier (now curling out of Bel-Aire). The two teams both had 6-1 round robin records, forcing the tiebreaker. Tobin's only loss of the tournament was against Lorraine Bowes of Baie d'Urfe. Tobin and teammates Marilyn McNeil (Hone), Garneau and Laurie Ross went on to represent Quebec at the 1975 Macdonald Lassies Championship. There, the team topped the round robin round with a 7–3 record, tied with Saskatchewan's Marj Mitchell rink. This forced the two provinces into a tiebreaker match for the championship, which Quebec won 7–5. The team disbanded the following season.

In 1976, Tobin won a Quebec mixed title playing third on a rink skipped by André Émond. The team finished with a 4–7 record (tied for 8th) at the 1976 Canadian Mixed Curling Championship.

Tobin was inducted into the Canadian Curling Hall of Fame in 1979.

Tobin played in one more national championship at the 1987 Scott Tournament of Hearts as Quebec's alternate. She did not play in any games. She also won a provincial senior title that year with teammates Marie Fullerton, Muriel Tonkin and Judy Wiltshire. The team finished in last place (11th) with a 1–9 record at the 1987 Canadian Senior Curling Championships.

== Personal life ==
Tobin was married to William Tobin and had four children. She worked as a book-keeper at the Caledonia Curling Club, and later became the club's manager before it closed down in 1980. She was inducted into the Quebec Curling Hall of Fame in 2017. She was nicknamed "Little Mouse" for her small size (4 ft 10; less than 100 pounds).
