= 1987 Scott Tournament of Hearts =

Canadian women's curling championship

- Host city: Lethbridge, Alberta
- Arena: Lethbridge Sportsplex
- Dates: February 28–March 7
- Attendance: 34,277
- Winner: British Columbia
- Curling club: Victoria Racquet Club, Victoria
- Skip: Pat Sanders
- Third: Georgina Hawkes
- Second: Louise Herlinveaux
- Lead: Deb Massullo
- Alternate: Elaine Dagg-Jackson
- Finalist: Manitoba (Kathie Ellwood)

The 1987 Scott Tournament of Hearts, the Canadian women's curling championship, was held from February 28 to March 7, 1987 at the Lethbridge Sportsplex in Lethbridge, Alberta. The total attendance for the week was a then-record 34,277, which shattered the previous mark set in 1984 by over 10,000.

Team British Columbia, who was skipped by Pat Sanders won the event after defeating Manitoba in the final 9–3 in nine ends. BC advanced to the final after defeating Quebec in the semifinal 10–6. This was BC's sixth championship and the only title skipped by Sanders.

Sanders' rink would represent Canada at the 1987 World Women's Curling Championship held in Chicago, Illinois, USA, where they won Canada's fourth straight world championship.

New Brunswick's 11–1 victory over Alberta in Draw 7 tied a record set in 1985 for the most stolen ends in a single game by one team as New Brunswick stole six ends in that game.

== Teams ==
The teams were listed as follows:

Team Canada	Alberta	British Columbia	Manitoba
St. Catharines CC, St. Catharines Skip: Marilyn Darte (Note: For Draws 6, 7 and 10, Team Canada skip Marilyn Darte threw third stones while third Kathy McEdwards threw skip stones.); Third: Kathy McEdwards; Second: Chris Jurgenson; Lead: Jan Augustyn; Alternate: Lynn Reynolds	Grand Prairie CC, Grande Prairie Skip: Karen Gould; Third: Marcy Balderston (Note: For Draw 9, Team Alberta alternate Janet Gummer threw lead stones, lead Jarron Savill threw second stones, second Tina Listhaeghe threw third stones as third Marcy Balderston sat out due to illness.); Second: Tina Listhaeghe; Lead: Jarron Savill; Alternate: Janet Gummer	Racquet Club, Victoria Skip: Pat Sanders; Third: Georgina Hawkes; Second: Louise Herlinveaux; Lead: Deb Massullo; Alternate: Elaine Dagg-Jackson	Deer Lodge CC, Winnipeg Skip: Kathie Ellwood; Third: Cathy Treloar; Second: Laurie Ellwood; Lead: Sandra Asham; Alternate: Jane Malcolmson
New Brunswick	Newfoundland	Nova Scotia	Ontario
Thistle St. Andrews CC, Saint John Skip: Heidi Hanlon; Third: Gail Shields; Second: Janyce Messer; Lead: Judy Blanchard; Alternate: Ellen Brennan	St. Johns CC, St. John's Skip: Cindy Crocker; Third: Andrea Bowering; Second: Gail Burry; Lead: Kathy O'Driscoll; Alternate: Debbie Bowering	CFB Halifax CC, Halifax Skip: Virginia Jackson; Third: Marg Cutcliffe; Second: Joan Hutchinson; Lead: Sherry Jackson; Alternate: Marie-Anne Vautour	Royal Canadian CC, Toronto Skip: Carol Thompson; Third: Anne Dunn; Second: Kim Duck; Lead: Lindy Crawford; Alternate: Patti Chow
Prince Edward Island	Quebec	Saskatchewan	Yukon/Northwest Territories
Charlottetown CC, Charlottetown Skip: Kim Dolan; Third: Karen Jones; Second: Shelley Muzika; Lead: Nancy Reid; Alternate: Cathy Dillon	Laviolette CC, Trois-Rivières Skip: Helene Tousignant; Third: Marie Ferland; Second: Nicole Corbin; Lead: Josee Dauphinais; Alternate: Lee Tobin	Tartan CC, Regina Skip: Kathy Fahlman; Third: Sandra Schmirler; Second: Jan Betker; Lead: Sheila Schneider; Alternate: Michelle Schneider	Whitehorse CC, Whitehorse Skip: Shelley Aucoin; Third: Kathy Chapman; Second: Donna Scott; Lead: Debbie Stokes; Alternate: Margaret Lawrence

== Map of teams ==
Team Canada Provincial Winners

== Round Robin standings ==
Final Round Robin standings

Key
Teams to Playoffs
Teams to Tiebreakers

Team	Skip	W	L	PF	PA	EW	EL	BE	SE	S%
Manitoba	Kathie Ellwood	8	3	76	55	44	39	8	13	65%
British Columbia	Pat Sanders	8	3	79	55	46	39	7	18	71%
Alberta	Karen Gould	7	4	74	64	44	40	6	19	68%
Quebec	Helene Tousignant	7	4	72	66	46	46	8	12	66%
Saskatchewan	Kathy Fahlman	7	4	76	60	46	40	7	15	73%
Ontario	Carol Thompson	6	5	73	74	46	42	4	19	67%
Yukon/Northwest Territories	Shelley Aucoin	6	5	61	69	47	40	8	17	66%
Newfoundland	Cindy Crocker	5	6	64	67	47	40	8	17	68%
Canada	Marilyn Darte	4	7	57	73	37	46	9	12	71%
New Brunswick	Heidi Hanlon	4	7	68	74	38	47	5	14	64%
Nova Scotia	Virginia Jackson	3	8	61	79	42	51	5	9	70%
Prince Edward Island	Kim Dolan	1	10	56	81	39	48	7	9	70%

== Round Robin results ==
All draw times are listed in Mountain Standard Time (UTC-07:00).

=== Draw 1 ===
Saturday, February 28, 1:00 pm

Sheet A	1	2	3	4	5	6	7	8	9	10	Final
Ontario (Thompson) 🔨	1	0	1	0	0	0	0	1	0	X	3
British Columbia (Sanders)	0	2	0	0	2	1	3	0	3	X	11

Sheet B	1	2	3	4	5	6	7	8	9	10	Final
Quebec (Tousignant) 🔨	2	0	0	2	0	0	2	0	1	1	8
Saskatchewan (Fahlman)	0	3	0	0	2	1	0	1	0	0	7

Sheet C	1	2	3	4	5	6	7	8	9	10	11	Final
Canada (Darte)	1	2	0	2	0	1	0	0	0	1	1	8
Prince Edward Island (Dolan) 🔨	0	0	0	0	1	0	3	1	2	0	0	7

Sheet D	1	2	3	4	5	6	7	8	9	10	Final
Manitoba (Ellwood)	0	0	2	0	2	1	0	1	2	X	8
New Brunswick (Hanlon) 🔨	1	3	0	0	0	0	1	0	0	X	5

Sheet E	1	2	3	4	5	6	7	8	9	10	Final
Yukon/Northwest Territories (Aucoin)	0	0	0	0	1	0	X	X	X	X	1
Newfoundland (Crocker) 🔨	4	0	1	2	0	2	X	X	X	X	9

=== Draw 2 ===
Saturday, February 28, 6:30 pm

Sheet A	1	2	3	4	5	6	7	8	9	10	11	Final
Yukon/Northwest Territories (Aucoin) 🔨	1	1	0	0	0	1	0	1	1	0	1	6
New Brunswick (Hanlon)	0	0	1	0	1	0	1	0	0	2	0	5

Sheet B	1	2	3	4	5	6	7	8	9	10	Final
Prince Edward Island (Dolan)	0	1	0	1	0	2	0	1	0	X	5
Manitoba (Ellwood) 🔨	0	0	3	0	3	0	1	0	1	X	8

Sheet C	1	2	3	4	5	6	7	8	9	10	Final
British Columbia (Sanders) 🔨	0	1	0	1	0	0	1	2	1	0	6
Newfoundland (Crocker)	1	0	0	0	1	2	0	0	0	1	5

Sheet D	1	2	3	4	5	6	7	8	9	10	Final
Ontario (Thompson)	2	1	1	0	3	0	1	0	1	X	9
Canada (Darte) 🔨	0	0	0	2	0	2	0	0	0	X	4

Sheet E	1	2	3	4	5	6	7	8	9	10	Final
Nova Scotia (Jackson) 🔨	1	0	3	1	0	0	0	1	0	0	6
Alberta (Gould)	0	2	0	0	1	1	1	0	2	2	9

=== Draw 3 ===
Sunday, March 1, 1:00 pm

Sheet A	1	2	3	4	5	6	7	8	9	10	Final
Manitoba (Ellwood) 🔨	0	0	0	3	1	0	0	3	0	1	8
Saskatchewan (Fahlman)	0	0	1	0	0	2	1	0	2	0	6

Sheet B	1	2	3	4	5	6	7	8	9	10	11	Final
Nova Scotia (Jackson) 🔨	0	0	0	1	0	0	1	1	0	1	0	4
British Columbia (Sanders)	0	1	1	0	1	0	0	0	1	0	1	5

Sheet C	1	2	3	4	5	6	7	8	9	10	Final
New Brunswick (Hanlon) 🔨	0	2	0	0	3	0	3	0	0	X	8
Quebec (Tousignant)	0	0	0	1	0	1	0	1	1	X	4

Sheet D	1	2	3	4	5	6	7	8	9	10	11	Final
Alberta (Gould)	0	0	0	1	0	2	0	2	0	1	0	6
Newfoundland (Crocker) 🔨	1	0	0	0	1	0	1	0	3	0	1	7

Sheet E	1	2	3	4	5	6	7	8	9	10	Final
Ontario (Thompson) 🔨	0	3	0	3	0	0	1	0	1	X	8
Yukon/Northwest Territories (Aucoin)	1	0	1	0	1	0	0	2	0	X	5

=== Draw 4 ===
Sunday, March 1, 6:30 pm

Sheet A	1	2	3	4	5	6	7	8	9	10	Final
Newfoundland (Crocker) 🔨	0	0	0	1	0	0	2	1	0	X	4
Quebec (Tousignant)	0	1	2	0	1	5	0	0	1	X	10

Sheet B	1	2	3	4	5	6	7	8	9	10	Final
Yukon/Northwest Territories (Aucoin) 🔨	1	2	0	0	0	2	1	0	1	1	8
Canada (Darte)	0	0	0	1	1	0	0	2	0	0	4

Sheet C	1	2	3	4	5	6	7	8	9	10	Final
Alberta (Gould)	0	2	0	0	2	2	0	1	0	3	10
Manitoba (Ellwood) 🔨	2	0	2	0	0	0	1	0	1	0	6

Sheet D	1	2	3	4	5	6	7	8	9	10	11	Final
Prince Edward Island (Dolan) 🔨	0	0	2	0	0	1	0	2	0	1	0	6
Saskatchewan (Fahlman)	0	1	0	2	2	0	1	0	0	0	3	9

Sheet E	1	2	3	4	5	6	7	8	9	10	Final
New Brunswick (Hanlon) 🔨	0	2	0	0	1	4	1	0	0	1	9
Nova Scotia (Jackson)	1	0	4	2	0	0	0	1	0	0	8

=== Draw 5 ===
Monday, March 2, 8:30 am

Sheet C	1	2	3	4	5	6	7	8	9	10	Final
Canada (Darte)	0	0	0	0	2	0	2	0	X	X	4
British Columbia (Sanders) 🔨	0	1	2	2	0	3	0	3	X	X	11

Sheet D	1	2	3	4	5	6	7	8	9	10	Final
Ontario (Thompson) 🔨	1	0	3	0	2	1	0	1	0	0	8
Prince Edward Island (Dolan)	0	4	0	0	0	0	1	0	1	1	7

=== Draw 6 ===
Monday, March 2, 1:00 pm

Sheet A	1	2	3	4	5	6	7	8	9	10	Final
Canada (Darte)	0	0	2	1	2	0	1	0	0	X	6
Manitoba (Ellwood)	0	1	0	0	0	2	0	0	1	X	4

Sheet B	1	2	3	4	5	6	7	8	9	10	Final
Newfoundland (Crocker) 🔨	2	0	0	2	1	0	3	0	1	X	9
Nova Scotia (Jackson)	0	1	0	0	0	2	0	1	0	X	4

Sheet C	1	2	3	4	5	6	7	8	9	10	Final
New Brunswick (Hanlon) 🔨	2	0	1	0	0	1	0	0	2	X	6
Saskatchewan (Fahlman)	0	2	0	2	2	0	0	2	0	X	8

Sheet D	1	2	3	4	5	6	7	8	9	10	Final
Yukon/Northwest Territories (Aucoin)	0	2	0	0	0	2	1	0	0	X	5
Alberta (Gould) 🔨	1	0	4	3	1	0	0	1	1	X	11

Sheet E	1	2	3	4	5	6	7	8	9	10	Final
Prince Edward Island (Dolan) 🔨	0	2	0	0	0	1	0	1	0	1	5
Quebec (Tousignant)	0	0	2	2	0	0	1	0	1	0	6

=== Draw 7 ===
Monday, March 2, 6:30 pm

Sheet A	1	2	3	4	5	6	7	8	9	10	Final
Saskatchewan (Fahlman) 🔨	1	1	1	0	0	0	2	0	1	X	6
Newfoundland (Crocker)	0	0	0	1	1	1	0	1	0	X	4

Sheet B	1	2	3	4	5	6	7	8	9	10	Final
Alberta (Gould) 🔨	0	0	0	1	0	0	0	0	X	X	1
New Brunswick (Hanlon)	1	1	1	0	1	1	4	2	X	X	11

Sheet C	1	2	3	4	5	6	7	8	9	10	Final
Nova Scotia (Jackson) 🔨	0	0	0	1	0	0	2	0	0	X	3
Yukon/Northwest Territories (Aucoin)	1	1	1	0	0	1	0	1	1	X	6

Sheet D	1	2	3	4	5	6	7	8	9	10	Final
British Columbia (Sanders)	0	4	0	0	2	1	0	0	0	1	8
Quebec (Touisgnant) 🔨	1	0	1	1	0	0	1	1	1	0	6

Sheet E	1	2	3	4	5	6	7	8	9	10	Final
Manitoba (Ellwood)	3	0	3	3	1	X	X	X	X	X	10
Ontario (Thompson) 🔨	0	1	0	0	0	X	X	X	X	X	1

=== Draw 8 ===
Tuesday, March 3, 8:30 am

Sheet B	1	2	3	4	5	6	7	8	9	10	Final
Manitoba (Ellwood) 🔨	0	0	2	0	1	0	0	0	0	X	3
Yukon/Northwest Territories (Aucoin)	0	0	0	2	0	1	1	1	1	X	6

Sheet C	1	2	3	4	5	6	7	8	9	10	Final
Newfoundland (Crocker) 🔨	2	0	1	1	0	1	1	0	2	X	8
New Brunswick (Hanlon)	0	2	0	0	0	0	0	1	0	X	3

=== Draw 9 ===
Tuesday, March 3, 1:00 pm

Sheet A	1	2	3	4	5	6	7	8	9	10	Final
Prince Edward Island (Dolan) 🔨	0	1	0	2	0	0	1	0	1	X	5
Alberta (Gould)	0	0	1	0	2	1	0	2	0	X	6

Sheet B	1	2	3	4	5	6	7	8	9	10	Final
Canada (Darte) 🔨	0	0	0	2	0	0	0	0	1	X	3
Newfoundland (Crocker)	0	0	1	0	1	1	0	4	0	X	7

Sheet C	1	2	3	4	5	6	7	8	9	10	11	Final
Quebec (Tousignant) 🔨	0	3	0	0	0	0	1	0	0	1	0	5
Manitoba (Ellwood)	0	0	1	1	0	1	0	1	1	0	1	6

Sheet D	1	2	3	4	5	6	7	8	9	10	Final
Nova Scotia (Jackson)	2	0	1	2	0	0	2	0	1	X	8
Ontario (Thompson) 🔨	0	1	0	0	3	0	0	1	0	X	5

Sheet E	1	2	3	4	5	6	7	8	9	10	Final
Saskatchewan (Fahlman)	0	0	1	0	1	0	1	0	X	X	3
British Columbia (Sanders) 🔨	1	0	0	3	0	2	0	3	X	X	9

=== Draw 10 ===
Tuesday, March 3, 6:30 pm

Sheet A	1	2	3	4	5	6	7	8	9	10	Final
Quebec (Tousignant)	0	0	2	0	1	1	0	1	0	4	9
Nova Scotia (Jackson) 🔨	1	1	0	1	0	0	1	0	1	0	5

Sheet B	1	2	3	4	5	6	7	8	9	10	Final
British Columbia (Sanders)	2	0	0	0	0	0	X	X	X	X	2
Alberta (Gould)	0	3	1	2	2	2	X	X	X	X	10

Sheet C	1	2	3	4	5	6	7	8	9	10	Final
Saskatchewan (Fahlman)	1	2	2	1	0	1	0	1	X	X	8
Ontario (Thompson) 🔨	0	0	0	0	0	0	1	0	X	X	1

Sheet D	1	2	3	4	5	6	7	8	9	10	Final
Yukon/Northwest Territories (Aucoin) 🔨	0	1	1	0	0	0	2	0	2	X	6
Prince Edward Island (Dolan)	1	0	0	1	0	0	0	1	0	X	3

Sheet E	1	2	3	4	5	6	7	8	9	10	Final
Canada (Darte) 🔨	1	1	0	0	3	1	5	X	X	X	11
New Brunswick (Hanlon)	0	0	0	2	0	0	0	X	X	X	2

=== Draw 11 ===
Wednesday, March 4, 8:30 am

Sheet C	1	2	3	4	5	6	7	8	9	10	Final
Quebec (Tousignant) 🔨	0	0	0	1	0	0	0	X	X	X	1
Alberta (Gould)	0	1	2	0	2	1	1	X	X	X	7

Sheet D	1	2	3	4	5	6	7	8	9	10	Final
Saskatchewan (Fahlman) 🔨	0	2	0	3	0	1	0	1	0	1	8
Nova Scotia (Jackson)	0	0	2	0	1	0	2	0	1	0	6

=== Draw 12 ===
Wednesday, March 4, 1:00 pm

Sheet A	1	2	3	4	5	6	7	8	9	10	Final
British Columbia (Sanders)	0	0	1	1	0	2	0	0	2	0	6
Yukon/Northwest Territories (Aucoin) 🔨	0	0	0	0	2	0	3	1	0	3	9

Sheet B	1	2	3	4	5	6	7	8	9	10	11	Final
New Brunswick (Hanlon)	0	2	0	0	0	1	0	3	0	0	0	6
Ontario (Thompson) 🔨	0	0	1	1	1	0	2	0	0	1	2	8

Sheet C	1	2	3	4	5	6	7	8	9	10	Final
Manitoba (Ellwood)	0	1	0	2	3	0	5	X	X	X	11
Nova Scotia (Jackson) 🔨	2	0	1	0	0	1	0	X	X	X	4

Sheet D	1	2	3	4	5	6	7	8	9	10	Final
Canada (Darte) 🔨	0	1	0	0	0	0	3	0	X	X	4
Alberta (Gould)	0	0	2	2	2	1	0	3	X	X	10

Sheet E	1	2	3	4	5	6	7	8	9	10	Final
Newfoundland (Crocker) 🔨	0	2	0	0	0	1	1	0	1	X	5
Prince Edward Island (Dolan)	0	0	2	2	2	0	0	1	0	X	7

=== Draw 13 ===
Wednesday, March 4, 6:30 pm

Sheet A	1	2	3	4	5	6	7	8	9	10	Final
New Brunswick (Hanlon) 🔨	5	2	0	2	1	1	X	X	X	X	11
Prince Edward Island (Dolan)	0	0	2	0	0	0	X	X	X	X	2

Sheet B	1	2	3	4	5	6	7	8	9	10	Final
Saskatchewan (Fahlman) 🔨	1	0	0	0	2	0	1	0	0	X	4
Canada (Darte)	0	2	0	1	0	1	0	1	1	X	6

Sheet C	1	2	3	4	5	6	7	8	9	10	Final
Ontario (Thompson) 🔨	4	1	3	0	0	1	1	4	X	X	14
Newfoundland (Crocker)	0	0	0	2	1	0	0	0	X	X	3

Sheet D	1	2	3	4	5	6	7	8	9	10	Final
Quebec (Tousignant)	0	1	2	0	0	0	1	0	0	5	9
Yukon/Northwest Territories (Aucoin) 🔨	1	0	0	0	1	0	0	1	1	0	4

Sheet E	1	2	3	4	5	6	7	8	9	10	Final
British Columbia (Sanders)	0	1	1	0	1	0	0	1	0	0	4
Manitoba (Ellwood) 🔨	1	0	0	1	0	2	0	0	0	1	5

=== Draw 14 ===
Thursday, March 5, 1:00 pm

Sheet A	1	2	3	4	5	6	7	8	9	10	Final
Alberta (Gould) 🔨	1	0	0	0	0	2	0	0	0	X	3
Ontario (Thompson)	0	1	2	1	0	0	2	1	1	X	8

Sheet B	1	2	3	4	5	6	7	8	9	10	Final
Nova Scotia (Jackson) 🔨	0	0	2	0	4	0	1	0	0	X	7
Prince Edward Island (Dolan)	0	0	0	2	0	1	0	1	1	X	5

Sheet C	1	2	3	4	5	6	7	8	9	10	Final
Yukon/Northwest Territories (Aucoin) 🔨	0	0	1	0	1	0	2	0	1	X	5
Saskatchewan (Fahlman)	0	2	0	2	0	2	0	2	0	X	8

Sheet D	1	2	3	4	5	6	7	8	9	10	Final
New Brunswick (Hanlon)	0	0	2	0	0	0	0	0	X	X	2
British Columbia (Sanders) 🔨	0	2	0	0	3	1	3	1	X	X	10

Sheet E	1	2	3	4	5	6	7	8	9	10	Final
Quebec (Tousignant) 🔨	1	0	0	1	0	2	0	0	1	0	5
Canada (Darte)	0	1	0	0	2	0	1	0	0	0	4

=== Draw 15 ===
Thursday, March 5, 6:30 pm

Sheet A	1	2	3	4	5	6	7	8	9	10	Final
Nova Scotia (Jackson)	0	1	0	0	2	1	0	1	0	1	6
Canada (Darte) 🔨	0	0	0	1	0	0	1	0	1	0	3

Sheet B	1	2	3	4	5	6	7	8	9	10	Final
Ontario (Thompson)	0	0	2	2	1	0	1	0	2	0	8
Quebec (Tousignant) 🔨	3	1	0	0	0	1	0	2	0	2	9

Sheet C	1	2	3	4	5	6	7	8	9	10	Final
Prince Edward Island (Dolan) 🔨	0	1	0	0	0	1	0	0	2	0	4
British Columbia (Sanders)	0	0	0	0	2	1	0	2	0	2	7

Sheet D	1	2	3	4	5	6	7	8	9	10	Final
Newfoundland (Crocker)	0	0	0	0	1	1	0	0	1	X	3
Manitoba (Ellwood) 🔨	2	2	0	0	0	0	1	2	0	X	7

Sheet E	1	2	3	4	5	6	7	8	9	10	Final
Alberta (Gould) 🔨	0	0	0	1	0	0	0	X	X	X	1
Saskatchewan (Fahlman)	0	2	0	0	0	5	2	X	X	X	9

== Tiebreakers ==
			To Semifinal
			1	Saskatchewan	3
2	Quebec	6		Quebec	9
3	Alberta	4

=== Round 1 ===
Friday, March 6, 8:30 am

Sheet D	1	2	3	4	5	6	7	8	9	10	Final
Quebec (Tousignant) 🔨	0	0	1	1	0	2	1	0	1	0	6
Alberta (Gould)	1	0	0	0	1	0	0	1	0	1	4

Player percentages
Quebec		Alberta	
Josee Dauphinais	72%	Jarron Savill	78%
Nicole Corbin	74%	Tina Listhaeghe	75%
Marie Ferland	86%	Marcy Balderston	80%
Helene Tousignant	71%	Karen Gould	66%
Total	76%	Total	75%

=== Round 2 ===
Friday, March 6, 1:00 pm

Sheet B	1	2	3	4	5	6	7	8	9	10	Final
Quebec (Tousignant) 🔨	0	2	0	2	2	2	0	1	X	X	9
Saskatchewan (Fahlman)	0	0	1	0	0	0	2	0	X	X	3

Player percentages
Quebec		Saskatchewan	
Josee Dauphinais	73%	Sheila Schneider	89%
Nicole Corbin	77%	Jan Betker	86%
Marie Ferland	78%	Sandra Schmirler	73%
Helene Tousignant	77%	Kathy Fahlman	41%
Total	76%	Total	72%

== Playoffs ==
Semifinal			Final
			1	Manitoba	3
2	British Columbia	10	2	British Columbia	9
3	Quebec	6

=== Semifinal ===
Friday, March 6, 6:30 pm

Sheet C	1	2	3	4	5	6	7	8	9	10	Final
Quebec (Tousignant)	0	2	0	0	0	1	0	2	1	X	6
British Columbia (Sanders) 🔨	2	0	1	2	2	0	3	0	0	X	10

Player percentages
Quebec		British Columbia	
Josee Dauphinais	59%	Deb Massullo	92%
Nicole Corbin	65%	Louise Herlinveaux	90%
Marie Ferland	86%	Georgina Hawkes	70%
Helene Tousignant	72%	Pat Sanders	76%
Total	70%	Total	82%

=== Final ===
Saturday, March 7, 11:00 am

Sheet C	1	2	3	4	5	6	7	8	9	10	Final
Manitoba (Ellwood) 🔨	0	0	1	0	1	0	1	0	0	X	3
British Columbia (Sanders)	0	1	0	2	0	2	0	2	2	X	9

Player percentages
Manitoba		British Columbia	
Sandra Asham	88%	Deb Massullo	94%
Laurie Ellwood	86%	Louise Herlinveaux	90%
Cathy Treloar	63%	Georgina Hawkes	78%
Kathie Ellwood	72%	Pat Sanders	85%
Total	77%	Total	87%

== Statistics ==
=== Top 5 player percentages ===
Final Round Robin Percentages

Key
All-Star Team

Leads	%
(British Columbia) Deb Massullo	77
(Canada) Jan Augustyn	76
(Saskatchewan) Sheila Schneider	75
(Prince Edward Island) Nancy Reid	74
(Ontario) Lindy Crawford	73
(Nova Scotia) Sherry Jackson	73

Seconds	%
(Saskatchewan) Jan Betker	78
(Newfoundland and Labrador) Gail Burry	75
(British Columbia) Louise Herlinveaux	75
(Nova Scotia) Joan Hutchinson	74
(Canada) Chris Jurgenson	73

Thirds	%
(Saskatchewan) Sandra Schmirler	75
(Prince Edward Island) Karen Jones	74
(Canada) Kathy McEdwards (Note: McEdwards' shot percentage includes the three draws where she threw fourth stones.)	70
(Ontario) Anne Dunn	68
(Nova Scotia) Marg Cutcliffe	67
(Alberta) Marcy Balderston	67

Skips	%
(British Columbia) Pat Sanders	68
(Manitoba) Kathie Ellwood	68
(Alberta) Karen Gould	66
(Newfoundland and Labrador) Cindy Crocker	64
(Ontario) Carol Thompson	64
(Nova Scotia) Virginia Jackson	64

== Awards ==
The all-star team and sportsmanship award winners were as follows:

=== All-Star Team ===
Position	Name	Team
Skip	Kathie Ellwood	Manitoba
Third	Sandra Schmirler	Saskatchewan
Second	Jan Betker	Saskatchewan
Lead	Sheila Schneider	Saskatchewan

=== Myrna McQuarrie Award ===
The Scotties Tournament of Hearts Sportsmanship Award is presented to the curler who best embodies the spirit of curling at the Scotties Tournament of Hearts. The winner was selected in a vote by all players at the tournament.

Prior to 1998, the award was named after a notable individual in the curling community where the tournament was held that year. For this edition, the award was named after Myrna McQuarrie, a Lethbridge native, who skipped Alberta to a women's national championship in 1977 and represented Alberta in the 1979 women's national championship.

Name	Team	Position
Kim Duck	Ontario	Second
