= Vancouver Courier =

Canadian semi-weekly local newspaper

- Type: Free weekly/bi-weekly newspaper
- Format: Tabloid
- Owner(s): Glacier Media
- Publisher: Alvin Brouwer
- Editor: Michael Kissinger
- Founded: 1908
- Language: English
- Ceased publication: September 2020
- Headquarters: 1574 West 6th Avenue; Vancouver, British Columbia V6J 1R2; Canada
- Circulation: 265,000
- ISSN: 1195-731X
- Website: www.vancourier.com

The Vancouver Courier was a Canadian semi-weekly local newspaper published in Vancouver, British Columbia, Canada, by the Van-Net chain owned by Glacier Media Group. In 2007, it was Canada's largest distributed community newspaper, with a weekly distribution of 265,000. The circulation estimate included the Vancouver Courier, the Vancouver Courier Downtown, and the Vancouver Courier Westside, along with the Vancouver Courier Eastside on Wednesdays.

Delivered to homes, the paper is distributed from UBC to the Vancouver proper boundary at Boundary Road.

The newspaper began as an independent in 1908 as the Eburne News. From the late 90s to 2007, it had several owners: first, the national Southam Inc. chain, then Hollinger, CanWest, Postmedia, and finally Glacier Media. It expanded from being a neighbourhood newspaper to its current citywide circulation area after acquiring the Vancouver Echo and the West End Times.

The paper was twice named "Best Community Newspaper in BC" and was the second runner-up in the Canadian Community Newspaper Association's general excellence competition.

Unlike most community newspapers, which feature several news stories on their front pages, the Courier's Friday front page featured a single, lengthy feature that ran over several pages. The paper also frequently published material on local Vancouver history, usually written by Lisa Smedman. Columnists included Geoff Olson, Allen Garr, Fiona Hughes, and Keith Baldrey. The poet Earle Birney worked at the paper in the mid-1920s as a summer reporter and editor.

In April 2020, the Courier announced that they had ceased publication until further notice due to a lack of advertising revenue associated with lower business activity during the COVID-19 pandemic. In September 2020, this temporary publication halt was made permanent.

== See also ==
- Vancouver Sun
- Vancouver Province
- List of newspapers in Canada
