= Allen Garr =

Canadian journalist

Allen Garr is a Canadian journalist who won the Jack Webster City Mike award in 2014. He is also an author and former journalism instructor based in Vancouver, British Columbia. Garr is well known in the city for his editorials covering civic politics in the weekly Vancouver Courier newspaper. He is the author of Tough Guy: Bill Bennett and the taking of British Columbia (Toronto: Key Porter Books, 1986, ISBN 0-919493-77-7), a book about the British Columbia Social Credit Party. Garr graduated from Simon Fraser University in 1968 and has since been a political commentator in various Canadian media outlets, including a five-year stint with the Vancouver Province newspaper and a decade with the Canadian Broadcasting Corporation's television news. He was an instructor in the journalism program at Langara College. He currently sits on the board of Vancity Savings Credit Union, the biggest credit union in Canada. And for the past 20 years he has been an active beekeeper with hives at both UBC and VanDusen Botanical Gardens and on the roof of the Vancouver Convention Centre.

He was in a relationship with fellow journalist Joan Andersen.
