= Central Collegiate =

Location
- 149 Oxford Street West; Moose Jaw, Saskatchewan, S6H 2N4; Canada

Information
- School type: High School
- Founded: 1909
- School board: Prairie South School Division No. 210
- Principal: Candice Krawetz
- Grades: 9-12
- Enrollment: 574 (2022)
- Language: English, French
- Area: Moose Jaw
- Colours: Red and Gold
- Team name: Cyclones
- Website: www.centralcollegiate.ca

Central Collegiate is a high school in Moose Jaw, Saskatchewan, Canada. It has approximately 520 students and 40 staff and is currently one of the oldest operating public schools in Saskatchewan. Central originally opened its doors in 1910.

Central is a progressive and diverse school. It offers a wide variety of courses in various disciplines: business, technology, fine arts, math, sciences, applied arts, wellness, humanities, and languages. There is also an English as a second language program for many Moose Jaw residents.

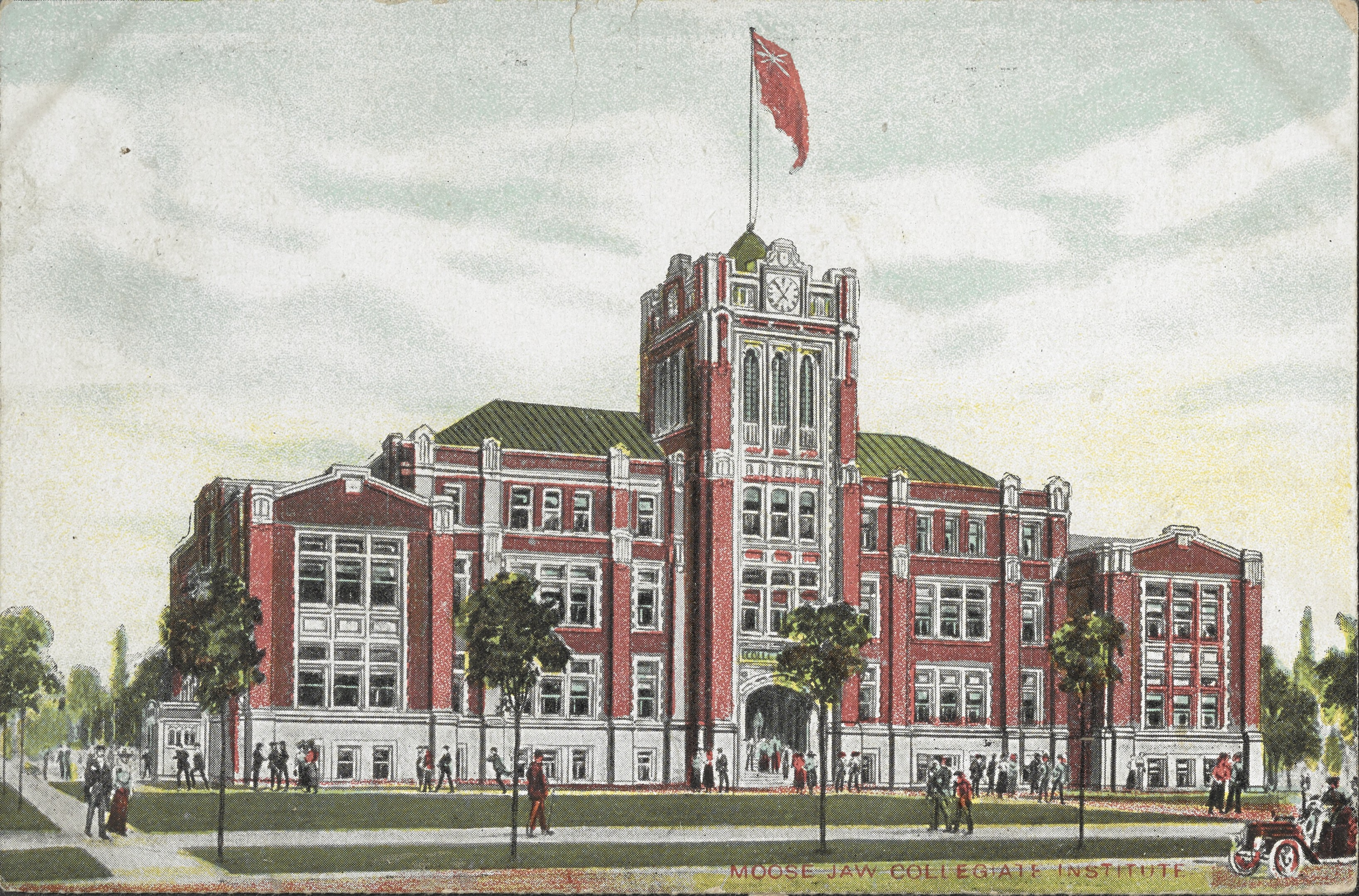
View of the front of the Central Collegiate institute in 1910.
