= Pat Sanders =

Canadian curler and world champion

Medal record

Representing Canada

Women's Curling

World Championships
Gold medal – first place	1987 Lake Forest	

World Senior Championships
Gold medal – first place	2009 Dunedin	
Gold medal – first place	2011 St. Paul	

Representing British Columbia

Scotties Tournament of Hearts
Gold medal – first place	1987 Lethbridge	
Silver medal – second place	1988 Fredericton	

Canadian Olympic Curling Trials
Bronze medal – third place	1987 Calgary	

Pat Sanders (born c. 1954 in Neepawa, Manitoba) is a Canadian curler and world champion from Victoria, British Columbia.

== Championships ==
Sanders became world champion in 1987 with the Canadian team.

Her team won the 1987 Scott Tournament of Hearts, and reached the final in 1988, finishing second.

In 2008, Sanders won the Canadian Senior Curling Championships, and won a gold medal for Canada at the 2009 World Senior Curling Championships.

She won the Canadian Seniors again in 2010 and another gold medal at the World Seniors in 2011.

She was inducted into the Canadian Curling Hall of Fame in 2012.

Sanders won the Canadian Masters Curling Championships in 2018, skipping team British Columbia.
