= Ontario Open =

Golf tournament on Canadian Tour

Tournament information
- Location: Ontario, Canada
- Established: 1923
- Course(s): Woodington Lake GC
- Tour(s): Canadian Tour
- Format: Stroke play
- Prize fund: C$200,000
- Month played: July

Current champion
- (United States) Noah Goodwin

The Ontario Open is a golf tournament on the PGA Tour Canada that is held in Ontario, Canada.

It was founded in 1923 and held every year through 1979, when the Peter Jackson Tour ended. After a long hiatus, an attempted revival in 1989 lasted only one year before the tournament returned for a five year run from 1992 to 1996, during which it was sponsored by the town of Newmarket, Ontario in the first year and then by Export "A" cigarettes. Another lengthy hiatus followed until the tournament returned as a non-tour event in 2019. The following year, it rejoined the tour schedule.

Through 1947 the Ontario Open was a simple 36-hole medal. Except for a three year span from 1960 to 1962 when it was a 72-hole event, from 1948 until it was cancelled in 1979 it was a 54-hole event. Except for 2019, it has been played as a 72-hole event every year since its first revival.

== Winners ==
Year	Venue	Winner	Score	Ref
Sotheby's International Realty Canada Ontario Open
2022	Woodington Lake	(United States) Noah Goodwin	267	
2020–2021	No tournament			
Ontario Open
2019	Woodington Lake	(Canada) Gregory Eason	208	
1997–2018	No tournament			
Export "A" Inc. Ontario Open
1996	St Thomas	(Canada) Martin Price	274 (−10) (Note: Price won with a birdie on the first hole of a sudden-death playoff.)	
1995	Forest City National	(United States) Ray Freeman	273 (−15)	
1994	Forest City National	(United States) Eric Woods	278 (−10)	
1993	Bridgewater	(United States) Eric Woods	270 (−18)	
Ontario Open
1992	Glenway	(Australia) Don Fardon	270	
1990–91	No tournament			
1989	Lookout Point	(United States) Michael Bradley	278	
1980–88	No tournament			
1979	Cataraqui	(Canada) Jerry Anderson	205	
1978	St Thomas	(Canada) George Knudson	212	
1977	Cultan	(Mexico) Tony Cerdá	201 (−9)	
1976	Mount Hope	(Canada) George Knudson	203	
1975	Barrie	(Canada) Michel Boyer	210 (−6)	
1974	Bayview	(United States) Artie McNickle	202 (−11)	
1973	Islington	(United States) Rafe Botts	211 (+1)	
1972	Cedar Brae	(Colombia) Alberto Rivadeneira	213 (+3) (Note: Rivadeneira won with a birdie on the second hole of a sudden-death playoff.)	
1971	Weston	(Canada) George Knudson	207 (−6)	
1970	Cutten	(Canada) Bill Wright Jr.	201 (−9)	
1969	St Catherines	(Canada) Nick Weslock (am)	208	
1968	Pine Valley	(Canada) Gary Cowan (am)	204 (−9)	
1967	Islington	(Canada) Bill Wakeham	208	
1966	Cataraqui	(Canada) Doug Mossop (am)	209 (−1)	
1965	Trafalgar	(Canada) Nick Weslock (am)	204	
1964	Islington	(Canada) Nick Weslock (am)	208	
1963	Pine Valley	(Canada) Moe Norman	211	
1962	Beach Grove	(Canada) Nick Weslock (am)	277	
1961	Islington	(Canada) George Knudson	275	
1960	Cherry Hill	(Canada) George Knudson	275	
1959	St Catherines	(Canada) Nick Weslock (am)	208	
1958	Cataraqui	(Canada) Moe Norman	211	
1957	St Catherines	(Canada) Jerry Kesselring	207 (−6)	
1956	Brentford	(Canada) Jerry Kesselring	207	
1955	Cataraqui	(Canada) Jules Huot	210	
1954	Cedar Brae	(Canada) Rudy Hovath	208 (−2)	
1953	Essex	(Canada) Jerry Kesselring (am)	209	
1952	Weston	(Canada) Jerry Kesselring (am)	211	
1951	Westmount	(United States) Smiley Quick	209 (−4)	
1950	St George's	(Canada) Murray Tucker	215	
1949	Essex	(Canada) Nick Weslock (am)	212	
1948	Scarboro	(Canada) Bob Gray	210 (−3)	
1947	St George's	(Canada) Bob Gray	142	
1946	Burlington	(Canada) Nick Wisnock (am) (Note: Wisnock later went by the name Weslock and won 6 further Ontario Open titles.)	134	
1945	Royal York	(Canada) Phil Farley (am)	142	
1944	Royal York	(Canada) Gordon Brydson	144	
1943	Royal York	(Canada) Jack Littler	146	
1942	Cedar Brae	(Canada) Phil Farley (am)	139	
1941	Hamilton	(Canada) Bobby Burns	138	
1940	Erie Downs	(United States) Sam Snead	139 (−5)	
1939	Burlington	(Canada) Henry Martell	141	
1938	Summit	(Canada) Bobby Alston	140	
1937	Hamilton	(Canada) Bobby Alston	139 (Note: Alston won after an 18-hole playoff; Bobby Alston 75, Bill MacWilliams 79.)	
1936	Toronto	(Canada) Dick Borthwick	144 (Note: Borthwick won after an 18-hole playoff; Dick Borthwick 74, Lou Cumming 76.)	
1935	Scarboro	(Canada) Lex Robson	145	
1934	Mississaugua	(Canada) Tommy McGrath	143	
1933	Toronto	(Canada) Arthur Hulbert	146 (Note: Hulbert won after an 18-hole playoff; Arthur Hulbert 75, Percy Bell 81.)	
1932	Rosedale	(Canada) Willie Lamb	137	
1931	Summit	(Canada) Dave Spittal	144 (Note: Spittal won after an 18-hole playoff; Dave Spittal 74, Arthur Hulbert 75, Jimmy Johnston 75.)	
1930	Toronto	(Canada) Gordon Brydson	151 (Note: Brydson won after an 18-hole playoff; Gordon Brydson 74, Lex Robson 75, Sandy Somerville 77.)	
1929	Lakeview	(Canada) Dave Spittal	148	
1928	Hamilton	(Canada) Arthur Hulbert	142	
1927	Rosedale	(Canada) Andy Kay	150 (Note: Kay won after an 18-hole playoff; Andy Kay 75, Tex Robson 79, Nicol Thompson 80, Jimmy Johnston 85.)	
1926	York Downs	(Canada) Andy Kay	146	
1925	Summit	(Canada) Nicol Thompson	144	
1924	Toronto	(Canada) Willie Freeman	152 (Note: Freeman won after an 18-hole playoff; Willie Freeman 85, George Lyon 86.)	
1923	Lakeview	(Canada) Andy Kay	153	
