= George Cumming (golfer) =

Scottish-Canadian golfer (1879–1950)

- Cumming, c. 1905

Personal information
- Full name: George Cumming
- Nationality: Scotland; Canada
- Born: 20 May 1879 Bridge of Weir, Scotland
- Died: 26 March 1950 (aged 70) Toronto, Ontario, Canada

Career
- Sport: Golf
- Status: Professional
- Professional wins: 3

Best results in major championships
- Masters Tournament: DNP
- PGA Championship: DNP
- U.S. Open: 9th: 1905
- The Open Championship: DNP

Achievements and awards
- Canadian Golf Hall of Fame: 1971

George Cumming (20 May 1879 – 26 March 1950) was a Scottish-Canadian professional golfer and club maker. Cumming was often referred to as the "Dean of Canadian Professional Golfers" and his teachings as proprietor of the Toronto Golf Club launched the career of many of Canada's best known professional golfers. He won the Canadian Open in 1905 and three of his assistants won the championship in the following years: Charles Murray, Albert Murray and Karl Keffer, each winning the championship twice.

Cumming finished in ninth place in the 1905 U.S. Open. He carded rounds of 85-82-75-81=323 and won $30. He was inducted into the Canadian Golf Hall of Fame and Museum in 1971.

== Early life ==
Cumming was born in Bridge of Weir, Scotland, on 20 May 1879. He was a championship player and a superb teacher of golf mechanics. At age ten, he worked as a caddie at Ranfurly Castle Golf Club where he often caddied for Willie Campbell, one of the best players in Scotland. He was apprenticed at age 14 to the Forgan Golf Co. in Glasgow as a club maker.

== Golf career ==
He moved to Dumfies and Galloway at age 16 and eventually became head professional. In 1900, he moved to Toronto and made the acquaintance of Stewart Gordon, the Honorary Secretary of Toronto Golf Club. Cumming was hired at age 21 as professional at the Toronto Golf Club and remained there for 50 years.

As a player, Cumming won the Canadian Open in 1905 (score 148) and was runner-up four times. He was ninth at the U.S. Open at Myopia Hunt Club in 1905 and the next week won a 36-hole event at The Country Club, near Boston. He had great success in four-ball matches with George Lyon. In 1913, he partnered with Percy Barrett in a well-publicized match versus Harry Vardon and Ted Ray. He was described as a shorter hitter with a pleasant-looking swing. He had strong hands and was a solid performer in all aspects of the game.

=== Golf course architecture ===
Cumming expanded the Mississaugua Golf & Country Club – originally designed by Percy Barrett – to 18 holes in 1909. The course started as 9 holes. In 1919 Donald Ross made several revisions. Cumming is also responsible for the first 9 holes at the Idylwylde Golf and Country Club in Sudbury, Ontario, as well as Scarboro Golf and Country Club and Sarnia Golf and Curling Club. He partnered with Melville Millar and designed the front nine of Port Colborne Golf Course in 1929.

== Death and legacy ==
Cumming died on 26 March 1950 in Toronto, Ontario, Canada. At the time of his death, he was Vice-President of the Canadian Professional Golfers' Association. He was inducted into the Canadian Golf Hall of Fame and Museum in 1971.

== Tournament wins (3) ==
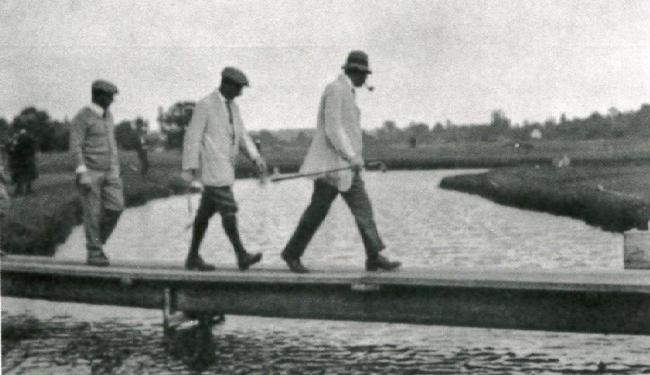
George Cumming (left), Harry Vardon (middle), and Ted Ray (right) walking across a bridge at Lambton Golf and Country Club, Toronto, Ontario, in a 1913 exhibition golf match. Percy Barrett (not pictured) partnered with Cumming.

Note: This list may be incomplete.

- 1905 Canadian Open
- 1905 Brookline Tournament
- 1914 Canadian PGA Championship

== Results in major championships ==
| Tournament | 1903 | 1904 | 1905 | 1906 | 1907 | 1908 | 1909 | 1910 | 1911 | 1912 | 1913 | 1914 |
|---|---|---|---|---|---|---|---|---|---|---|---|---|
| U.S. Open | 22 | 28 | 9 | T18 | ? | 32 | ? | T14 | T20 | T23 | 47 | T39 |

Note: Cumming played only in the U.S. Open.

T = Tied for a place
Yellow background for top-10
? = Unknown
