= Rosedale Golf Club =

Private golf club in Toronto, Ontario

Coordinates: 43.736°N 79.392°W

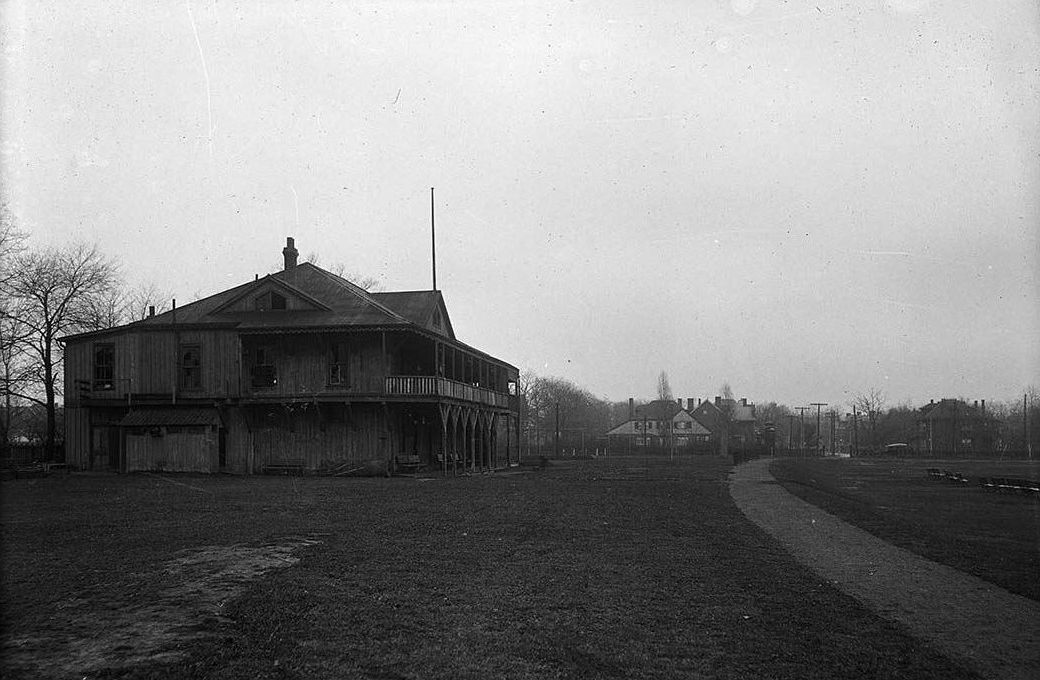
Rosedale clubhouse, 1921

Rosedale Golf Club is a private golf club in Toronto, founded in 1893 in Moore Park. The course hosted the Canadian Open in 1912 and 1928.

== History ==
Founded in 1893 in Moore Park as a 9-hole course and moved to Rosedale, Toronto in 1895–1896 on what is now Rosedale Field. It was an eighteen hole course on 15 acres/ This location was short-lived as the land was owned by The Scottish Ontario and Manitoba Land Company (founded by William Bain Scarth in 1879) and the area was being acquired to become a residential development called North Rosedale. In 1909, the course moved north along the Don River to its current site between the neighbourhoods of Teddington Park to the west, Lawrence Park to the south, The Bridle Path to the east and Hoggs Hollow to the north.

The club's centennial history was documented in Rosedale: The First 100 Years of Rosedale Golf Club by Jack Batten (1993, ISBN 0-9697736-0-9), with a foreword by Jack Nicklaus.

== Course ==
The course is an 18-hole, par-71 layout measuring approximately 6,600 yd (6,000 m) from the championship tees. It features classic Donald Ross characteristics, including undulating greens, strategic bunkering, subtle contours, and integration with the Don River valley terrain.

Notable holes include:

- No. 1 – A demanding downhill par 4 with a sloping fairway and elevated green.
- No. 3 – A dogleg-right par 4 along the river with a blind approach.
- No. 13 – A long par 3 over a valley to a severely contoured green.
- No. 14 – A challenging par 4 with a blind second shot to a tiered green.
- No. 18 – A short par 4 finishing hole with dramatic elevation changes and a small, heavily defended green.

== Notable members ==
Rosedale has been home to prominent Canadian golfers, including:

- George S. Lyon, introduced to golf at Rosedale in 1895 by member John Dick while waiting for cricket practice; Olympic gold medalist (1904); eight-time Canadian Amateur champion.

== Controversy ==
Members of the Toronto Jewish community bought land and established the Oakdale Golf & Country Club in 1926 in response to antisemitism in Canada that strictly excluded Jews from private golf clubs, including the Rosedale Golf Club.

In 2004, the club was sued by McDonald's Canada chairman and CEO George Cohon, who alleged that the club rejected his membership application due to his Jewish heritage. In response, the club eventually officially discontinued its policy of not admitting Jewish members, and admitted Cohon to the club. Cohon became the club's first Jewish member in its 111 year history. In 2004, a former general manager of the golf club was awarded $370,000 by an Ontario judge as compensation for being fired in 1997 after he tried to change the club's no-Jews policy.

== Tournaments ==
The club has hosted several tournaments including the Canadian Open in 1912 and 1928. In more recent years, the club has elected to only host tournaments that cause little disruption to the membership.

== Current course ==
The course plays to par 71 (73 for ladies) and is 6,525 yards in length.

== See also ==
Other clubs in Toronto:

- Lambton Golf Club
- Oakdale Golf & Country Club
- Scarboro Golf and Country Club
- St. George's Golf and Country Club
- Toronto Golf Club
