= Mississaugua Golf & Country Club =

Sports club in Ontario, Canada

Coordinates: 43.55119°N 79.62221°W

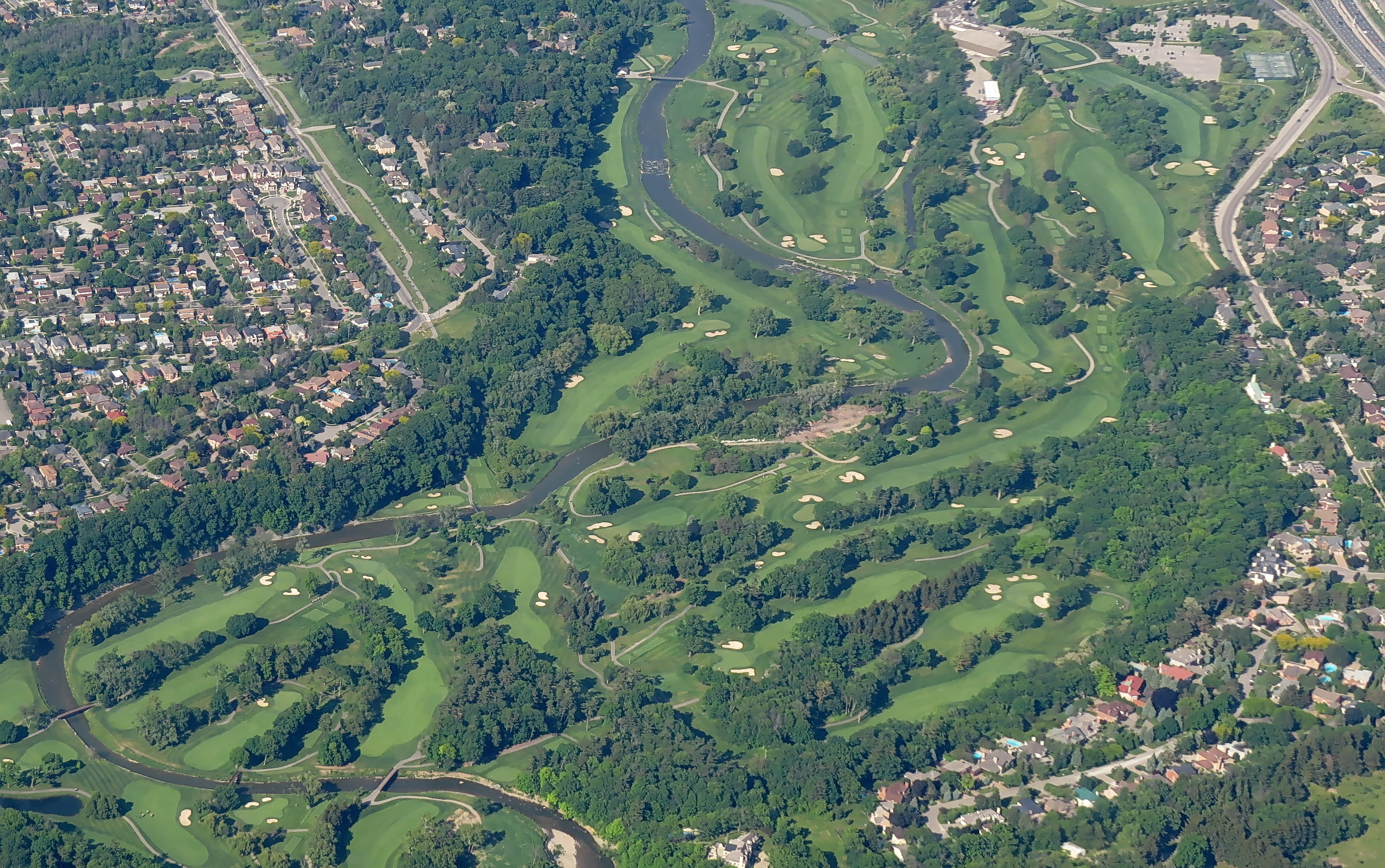
Aerial view of the Mississaugua Golf & Country Club

The Mississaugua Golf & Country Club is a mixed club featuring an 18-hole championship golf course, curling facilities with six sheets, pro shop and lounge, tennis courts, fitness centre, and an active bridge club. It was founded in 1906 and is located in south-central Mississauga, Ontario (the spelling difference between the names of the city and the club is intentional).

Built on the site of the Credit Indian Village approximately fifty years after the land was initially expropriated, the course started as 9 holes, designed by Percy Barrett of the Lambton Golf Club. In 1909, the course was expanded to 18 by George Cumming from the Toronto Golf Club, and in 1919 Donald Ross made several revisions. The course was lengthened by Stanley Thompson in 1927, to prepare for the 1931 Canadian Open. It currently plays to par 71, measuring 6,663 yards from the gold tees and 7,115 yards from the back black tees. The club went through a golf course renovation program by rebuilding all of their greens in the latter part of 2007 and ending mid year 2008.

Mississaugua Golf & Country Club has hosted the Canadian Open professional men's championship six times;

- 1931 Walter Hagen
- 1938 Sam Snead
- 1942 Craig Wood
- 1951 Jim Ferrier
- 1965 Gene Littler
- 1974 Bobby Nichols

The club has also hosted many Canadian amateur, women's and senior tournaments. It hosted the 2016 World Junior Girls Golf Championship and the CPKC Women's Open in August, 2025.
