= Albert Murray (golfer) =

English-born Canadian golfer

Albert Henry Murray (September 3, 1887 — June 17, 1974) was an English born Canadian professional golfer. During his playing career, Murray became the youngest Canadian Open winner in 1908. After rewinning the Canadian Open in 1913, Murray was the 1924 Canadian PGA Championship winner. Outside of playing, Murray planned out golf courses throughout Quebec such as the Royal Quebec Golf Club and Country Club of Montreal. Among his honours, Murray was inducted into the Canadian Golf Hall of Fame in 1974 and the Canada's Sports Hall of Fame in 2015.

== Early life ==
On September 3, 1887, Murray was born in Nottingham, England. After moving to Toronto when he was an infant, Murray was a caddie at the Toronto Golf Club between 1897 and 1902.

== Career ==
After moving to Montreal in 1903, Murray became the youngest Canadian professional golfer while assistant to his brother Charlie Murray. While in Quebec, Murray won the Quebec Open in 1910 before reclaiming the championship in 1930. In other Canadian events, Murray won the Canadian Open twice with his 1908 and 1913 wins. With the 1908 championship, Murray became the youngest person to win the Canadian open, a record he still holds more than a 100 years later. Murray also won the Canadian PGA Championship in 1924 and the Seniors' Championship in 1939 and 1942 editions. In PGA Tour majors, Murray appeared three times at the U.S. Open between 1909 and 1913. His best performance was 26th at the 1912 U.S. Open.

Outside of his playing career, Murray co-founded the Canadian Professional Golfers Association in 1911 and opened Canada's first indoor golf school in the basement of the Ritz-Carlton hotel in Montreal in 1916. As a builder, Murray planned and redesigned golf courses throughout Quebec including the Country Club of Montreal and Royal Quebec Golf Club. In executive positions, Murray first held the position of president for the PGA of Canada between 1920 and 1921. He resumed his executive position with the PGA of Canada in 1933 and 1941.

== Awards and honours ==
In 1974, Murray was inducted into the Canadian Golf Hall of Fame. His posthumous inductions include the Golf Quebec Hall of Fame in 1996, PGA of Canada Hall of Fame in 2014, and the Canada's Sports Hall of Fame in 2015.

== Personal life ==
Murray died on June 17, 1974, in the Montreal Neurological Hospital. He was married and had three children.
