= K. Rai Sahi =

Canadian businessman

- Born: Kuldip Rai Sahi; April 30, 1946 (age 80); India
- Citizenship: Canadian
- Occupation: Businessman
- Known for: Chairman of Morguard Corporation and CEO of Canada’s largest member golf clubs

K. (Kuldip) Rai Sahi is a Canadian business man who serves as chairman and chief executive officer of Morguard Corporation, one of Canada's largest integrated real estate companies, and chairman and chief executive officer of ClubLink Enterprises Limited, Canada’s largest owner/operator of member golf clubs.

In 2009, Sahi ranked eighth among "The Top 25 Most Influential Figures in Canadian Golf".

== Early life ==
Sahi was born in India in 1946 and attended DAV College in Kanpur, India where he obtained an economics degree. Sahi emigrated from India to Canada in 1971.

== Career ==
He began his career as a laborer in Montreal. He moved on to build CF Kingsway Inc., Canada's third-largest trucking operation. He then branched into manufacturing and real estate.

Sahi is an example of the "democratization of ownership in Canada from a country in 1986 owned by a few dozen rich families and conglomerates to hundreds of wealthy Canadian families, gigantic pension or mutual funds and millions of Canadian investors". Sahi has also been described as "the closest thing to a Wall Street raider that you'll find in Canada."

=== Businesses ===
Morguard Corporation has extensive retail, office, industrial and residential holdings through its real estate holdings and its investment in Morguard Real Estate Investment Trust (REIT).

ClubLink Enterprises conducted operations in two business areas: golf club and resort operations; and rail, tourism and port operations. The corporation owns and operates more than forty golf courses in Ontario, Quebec and Florida. Its subsidiary, White Pass, (Sold to Carnival in 2018 with $290 Million US.) owned and operated rail, tourism and port operations based in Skagway, Alaska.

In 2007, Sahi was appointed to the board of directors of the Canadian Broadcasting Corporation.

== Recognition ==
In 2009, Sahi was among seven Indo-Canadians awarded the Voice Achievers Award for 2009 for their outstanding contributions in fields of film, trade, medicine, literature and sports.
