= Clublink =

Canadian golf course operator

Coordinates: 43.9977°N 79.5136°W

TWC Enterprises Limited
- Trade name: TWC
- Type: Public company
- Traded as: TSX: TWC
- Founded: King City, Ontario, Canada (1993)
- Founders: Bruce Simmonds, Paul Simmonds
- Headquarters: King City, Ontario, Canada
- Owner: Tri-White Corporation
- Website: www.twcenterprises.ca

TWC Enterprises Limited (TSX: TWC) operates ClubLink One Membership More Golf. It is based in King City, Ontario, and is listed on the Toronto Stock Exchange (TSX) with the symbol "TWC".

ClubLink is the largest owner and operator of golf courses in Canada. It is based in King City, Ontario. It was founded in 1993 by entrepreneur Bruce Simmonds and co-founded by Paul Simmonds. Its headquarters is located at the King Valley Golf Club. In 2007, ClubLink was purchased by Tri-White Corporation, an investment firm run by K. Rai Sahi, an Indo-Canadian real estate entrepreneur.

One of the major properties owned by the company (since 2005) is the Glen Abbey Golf Course. It is home to the Golf Canada and the Canadian Golf Hall of Fame and has hosted 25 Canadian Open Championships, more than any other course, with the first having been 1977. ClubLink Corp filed an application in October 2015 to redevelop the property into a residential community, with offices and retail stores. There was no provision for a golf course in the plan. The Town of Oakville Council responded in August 2017 by declaring the golf course a heritage site under the Ontario Heritage Act. This would make it more difficult for ClubLink to develop the area as it had planned, with 3,222 housing units and 122,000 square feet of retail and commercial space. Golf Canada was also concerned since it could not predict whether it could get the necessary permit to hold the Canadian Open at Glen Abbey in 2018.

The company's plan to demolish the golf course was proceeding slowly in 2018 so the Canadian Open was held at this location. On 25 October 2018, Superior Court Justice Edward Morgan ruled that Clublink had a right to take its demolition application to the Local Planning Appeal Tribunal (LPAT), in spite of the town's previous denial of this step. City council subsequently voted to take the issue to the Ontario Court of Appeal. A report at that time clarified the owner's plan: building "3,222 residential units, including nine apartment buildings between nine and 12 storeys in height". These would be over and above the planned office space and commercial/retail space.

On 25 October 2018, Superior Court Justice Edward Morgan ruled that Clublink had a right to take its demolition application to the Local Planning Appeal Tribunal (LPAT), in spite of the town's previous denial of this step. A report at that time clarified the owner's plan: building "3,222 residential units, including nine apartment buildings between nine and 12 storeys in height". These would be over and above the planned office space and commercial/retail space.

In June 2018, TWC Enterprises announced that it had sold the White Pass and Yukon Route to Carnival Corporation & plc for US$290,000,000. The properties sold were port, railroad and retail operations in Skagway, Alaska.

In July 2021 the Globe & Mail reported "Ontario Minister for Municipal Affairs Steve Clark says in a statement that he had been asked to intervene this week by the Town of Oakville and Halton Region. Clark says he got a commitment from ClubLink to not only end its appeal but withdraw plans for development and to continue operation of Glen Abbey as a golf course."

In 2021, Clublink's "Country Club" golf course in Woodbridge (opened in 1965 by the Toronto Board of Trade) was approved for residential redevelopment. The course was closed after the 2022 season, and the clubhouse demolished in early 2024.
