= Point Grey Golf & Country Club =

Golf club in Vancouver, Canada

- Interactive map of Point Grey Golf & Country Club
- 49.22908°N 123.18014°W

Club information
- Location: Vancouver, British Columbia, Canada
- Established: 1922, 104 years ago
- Type: Private
- Total holes: 18
- Tournaments: Canadian Open (1954)
- Website: https://pointgreygolf.com/
- Par: 72
- Length: 6,482 yards (5,927 m) Longest hole is #1 - 543 yards

Point Grey Golf & Country Club is a private golf club in Canada, located on Southwest Marine Drive in Vancouver, British Columbia.

== History ==
The golf course at Point Grey Golf & Country Club opened in 1922 and was developed by a group of Scottish golf enthusiasts. The original layout was built as a parkland-style course making use of the location's rolling terrain and coastal forest setting, and it has maintained its original design through successive decades of incremental modification rather than full redesigns. Over time, the course has been refined through multiple renovation phases, including a long-range master planning process initiated in 2017 to guide infrastructure upgrades and facility improvements.

The club is historically associated with the 1954 Canadian Open, part of the PGA Tour, which was won by Canadian professional golfer Pat Fletcher, the last Canadian to win the event.

== Tournaments hosted ==
- 1954 Canadian Open (PGA Tour), won by Pat Fletcher.
- British Columbia Open in 1930, 1939, 1949, 1956, 1958, 1969, 1963, 1966, 1974, 1982, 1983, 1984, 1985, 1986, 1987, 1988, 1989, 1991 and 1992.

== Scorecard ==
| Hole | Name | Yards | Par | Hole | Name | Yards | Par |
|---|---|---|---|---|---|---|---|
| 1 | | 543 | 5 | 10 | | 155 | 3 |
| 2 | | 159 | 3 | 11 | | 360 | 4 |
| 3 | | 504 | 5 | 12 | | 526 | 5 |
| 4 | | 330 | 4 | 13 | | 186 | 3 |
| 5 | | 396 | 4 | 14 | | 412 | 4 |
| 6 | | 399 | 4 | 15 | | 392 | 4 |
| 7 | | 402 | 4 | 16 | | 388 | 4 |
| 8 | | 190 | 3 | 17 | | 188 | 3 |
| 9 | | 510 | 5 | 18 | | 482 | 5 |
| Out | | 3393 | 37 | In | | 3089 | 35 |
| Source: | | | | Total | | 6482 | 72 |

== See also ==
- List of golf courses in British Columbia
