= Canadian Open (golf) =

Golf tournament held in Canada

RBC Canadian Open

Tournament information
- Location: Caledon, Ontario
- Established: 1904; 122 years ago
- Course: TPC Toronto at Osprey Valley (North course)
- Par: 70
- Length: 7,389 yards (6,757 m)
- Organized by: Golf Canada
- Tour: PGA Tour
- Format: Stroke play
- Prize fund: US$9,800,000
- Month played: June
- Website: rbccanadianopen.com

Tournament record score
- Aggregate: 258 Rory McIlroy (2019)
- To par: −25 Johnny Palmer (1952)

Current champion
- (United States) Bud Cauley

Location map
- Location in Canada Location in Ontario

The Canadian Open (French: L'Omnium Canadien) is a professional golf tournament in Canada. It is co-organized by Golf Canada (formerly known as the Royal Canadian Golf Association) and the PGA Tour. It was first played 122 years ago in 1904, and has been held annually since then, except during World War I, World War II and the COVID-19 pandemic. It is the third oldest continuously running tournament on the tour, after The Open Championship and the U.S. Open.

== Tournament ==
As a national open, and especially as the most accessible non-U.S. national open for American golfers, the event had a special status in the era before the professional tour system became dominant in golf. In the interwar years, it was sometimes considered the third most prestigious tournament in the sport, after The Open Championship and the U.S. Open. This previous status was noted in the media in 2000, when Tiger Woods became the first man to win The Triple Crown (all three Opens in the same season) in 29 years, since Lee Trevino in 1971. In the decades preceding the tournament's move to an undesirable September date in 1988, the Canadian Open was often unofficially referred to as the fifth major.

The top three golfers on the PGA Tour Canada Order of Merit prior to the tournament are given entry into the Canadian Open. However, prize money won at the Canadian Open does not count towards the Canadian Tour money list.

Celebrated winners include Hall of Fame members Leo Diegel, Walter Hagen, Tommy Armour, Harry Cooper, Lawson Little, Sam Snead, Craig Wood, Byron Nelson, Doug Ford, Bobby Locke, Bob Charles, Arnold Palmer, Kel Nagle, Billy Casper, Gene Littler, Lee Trevino, Curtis Strange, Greg Norman, Nick Price, Vijay Singh, Mark O'Meara, and Tiger Woods. The Canadian Open is regarded as the most prestigious tournament never won by Jack Nicklaus, a seven-time runner-up. Diegel has the most titles, with four in the 1920s.

In the early 2000s, the tournament was still being held in early September. Seeking to change back to a more desirable summer date in the schedule, the RCGA lobbied for a better date. When the PGA Tour's schedule was revamped to accommodate the FedEx Cup in 2007, the Canadian Open was rescheduled for late July, sandwiched between three events with even higher profiles (The Open Championship the week prior, the WGC-Bridgestone Invitational the week after, and the PGA Championship the week after that). The tournament counts towards the FedEx Cup standings, and earns the winner a Masters invitation.

In 2019, due to a re-alignment of the PGA Tour and major scheduling, the Canadian Open moved to early-June prior to the U.S. Open. The event was also added to the Open Qualifying Series, allowing up to three of the top-ten finishers to qualify for the Open Championship.

The 2020 event, originally scheduled for June 11 to 14 at St. George's Golf and Country Club in Toronto, was cancelled because of the COVID-19 pandemic. On March 9, 2021, Golf Canada announced that the 2021 tournament would be cancelled as well.

== Courses ==
Glen Abbey Golf Course in Oakville, Ontario, has hosted the most Canadian Opens, with 30 to date. Glen Abbey was designed in 1976 by Jack Nicklaus for the Royal Canadian Golf Association, to serve as the permanent home for the championship.

In the mid-1990s, the RCGA decided to move the championship around the country. The owner of Glen Abbey since 2005, Clublink Corp filed an application in October 2015 to redevelop the property into a residential community, with offices and retail stores. There was no provision for a golf course in the plan. The Town of Oakville Council responded in August 2017 by declaring the golf course a heritage site under the Ontario Heritage Act, which would make it more difficult for ClubLink to develop the area as it had planned. Golf Canada was also concerned since it could not predict whether it could get the necessary permit to hold the Canadian Open at Glen Abbey in 2018 as it had planned. The dispute between the Town of Oakville and ClubLink was resolved in July 2021 when Clublink withdrew its appeals to the Ontario Land Tribunal. The 2019 Open was held at Hamilton Golf and Country Club. The event may again be held at Glen Abbey in some future years if the planned redevelopment by Clublink is not allowed to proceed. The 2023 Open was held at the Oakdale Golf & Country Club.

Royal Montreal Golf Club, home of the first Open in 1904, ranks second having hosted the event ten times. Hamilton Golf and Country Club has hosted seven Opens and Mississaugua Golf & Country Club six, while Toronto Golf Club and St. George's Golf and Country Club have each hosted five Opens. Three clubs have each hosted four Opens: Lambton Golf Club, Shaughnessy Golf & Country Club, and Scarboro Golf and Country Club.

The championship has for the most part been held in Ontario and Quebec, between them having seen all but nine Opens. New Brunswick had the Open in 1939, Manitoba in 1952 and 1961, Alberta in 1958, and British Columbia in 1948, 1954, 1966, 2005 and 2011.

Venue	Location	First	Last	Times
Royal Montreal Golf Club	Two venues	1904	2014	10
Royal Montreal Golf Club	Dorval, Quebec	1904	1950	(5)
Royal Montreal Golf Club	Île Bizard, Quebec	1975	2014	(5)
Toronto Golf Club	Two venues	1905	1927	5
Toronto Golf Club	Toronto, Ontario	1905	1909	(2)
Toronto Golf Club	Mississauga, Ontario	1914	1927	(3)
Royal Ottawa Golf Club	Aylmer, Quebec	1906	1911	2
Lambton Golf Club	Toronto, Ontario	1907	1941	4
Rosedale Golf Club	Toronto, Ontario	1912	1928	2
Hamilton Golf and Country Club	Ancaster, Ontario	1919	2024	7
Rivermead Golf Club	Aylmer, Quebec	1920	1920	1
Mt. Bruno Golf Club	St. Bruno, Quebec	1922	1924	2
Lakeview Golf Club	Mississauga, Ontario	1923	1934	2
Kanawaki Golf Club	Kahnawake, Quebec	1929	1929	1
Mississaugua Golf & Country Club	Mississauga, Ontario	1931	1974	6
Ottawa Hunt and Golf Club	Ottawa, Ontario	1932	1932	1
St. George's Golf and Country Club	Etobicoke, Toronto, Ontario	1933	2022	6
Summerlea Golf Club	Montreal, Quebec	1935	1935	1
St. Andrews Club	Toronto, Ontario	1936	1937	2
Riverside Country Club	Rothesay, New Brunswick	1939	1939	1
Scarboro Golf and Country Club	Scarborough, Toronto, Ontario	1940	1963	4
Thornhill Golf Club	Thornhill, Ontario	1945	1945	1
Beaconsfield Golf Club	Montreal, Quebec	1946	1956	2
Shaughnessy Golf & Country Club	Vancouver, British Columbia	1948	2011	4
St. Charles Country Club	Winnipeg, Manitoba	1952	1952	1
Point Grey Golf & Country Club	Vancouver, British Columbia	1954	1954	1
Weston Golf and Country Club	Toronto, Ontario	1955	1955	1
Westmount Golf and Country Club	Kitchener, Ontario	1957	1957	1
Royal Mayfair Golf and Country Club	Edmonton, Alberta	1958	1958	1
Islesmere Golf and Country Club	Montreal, Quebec	1959	1959	1
Niakwa Country Club	Winnipeg, Manitoba	1961	1961	1
Le Club Laval-sur-le-Lac	Laval-sur-le-Lac, Quebec	1962	1962	1
Pine Grove Golf and Country Club	St. Luc, Quebec	1964	1969	2
Montreal Municipal Golf Club	Montreal, Quebec	1967	1967	1
London Hunt and Country Club	London, Ontario	1970	1970	1
Richelieu Valley Golf and Country Club	Ste.-Julie, Quebec	1971	1973	2
Cherry Hill Club	Ridgeway, Ontario	1972	1972	1
Essex Golf & Country Club	Windsor, Ontario	1976	1976	1
Glen Abbey Golf Course	Oakville, Ontario	1977	2018	30
Angus Glen Golf Club	Markham, Ontario	2002	2007	2
Oakdale Golf & Country Club	Toronto, Ontario	2023	2023	1
TPC Toronto at Osprey Valley	Caledon, Ontario	2025	2026	2

The 2002 event was held on the south course at Angus Glen Golf Club, while the 2007 event was held on the north course.

== History ==
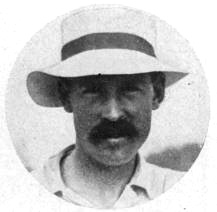
George Sargent, winner of the 1912 Canadian Open at Rosedale Golf Club.

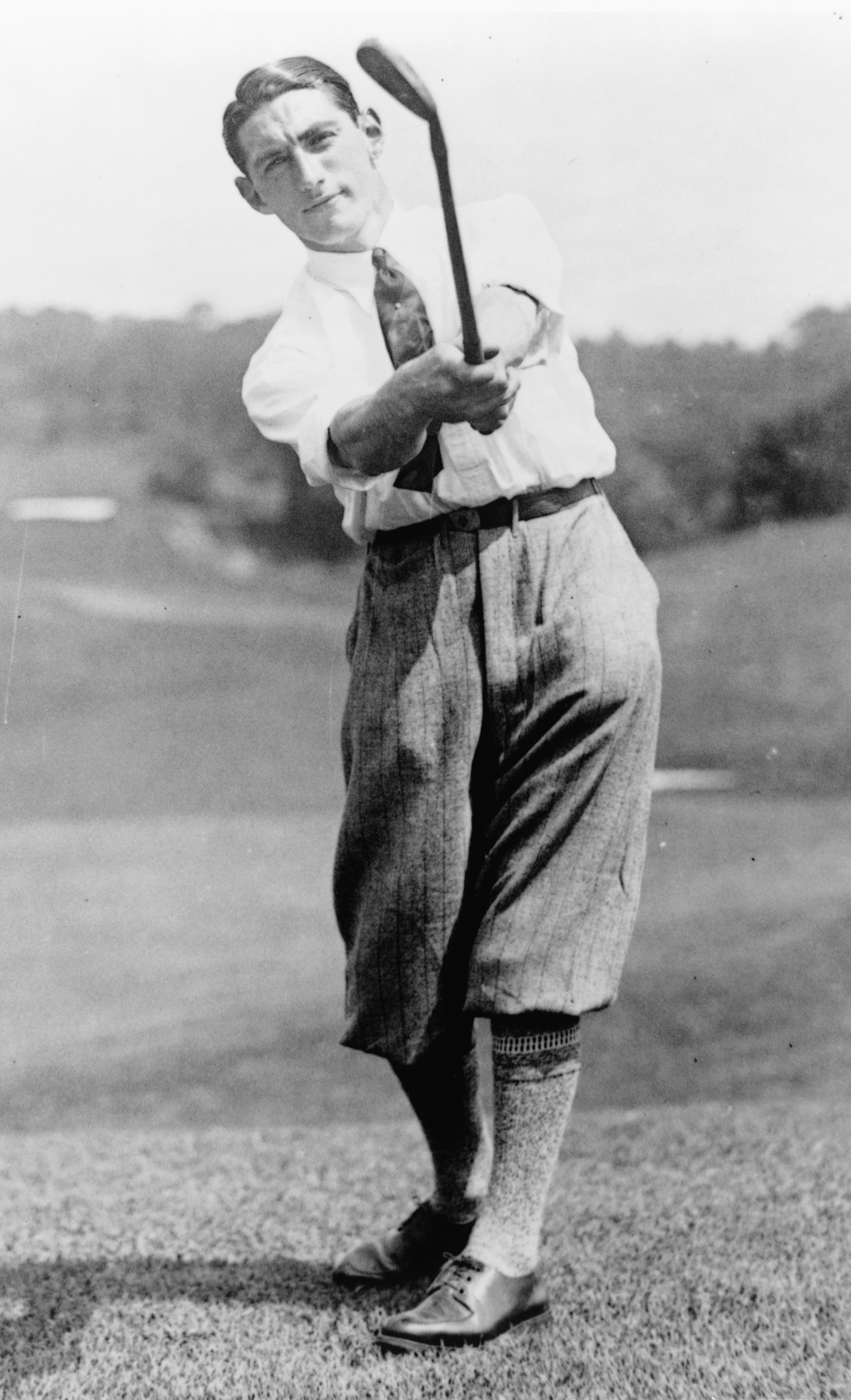
Tommy Armour, three-time Canadian Open champion in 1927, 1930 and 1934. Other three-time winners are Sam Snead and Lee Trevino.

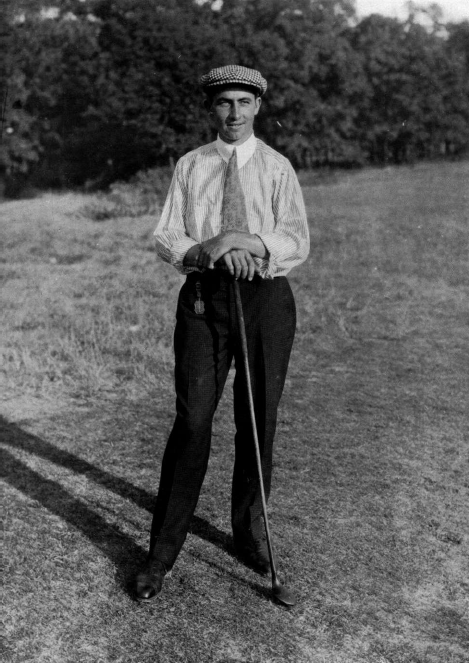
Walter Hagen, winner at the 1931 Canadian Open Championship.

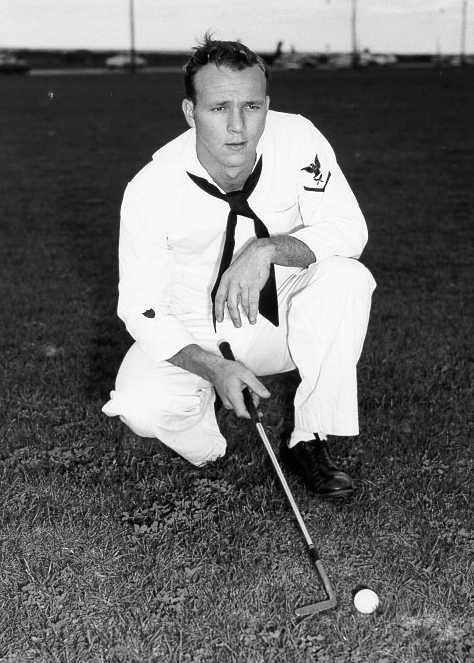
Arnold Palmer, 1955 Open winner, his first PGA Tour victory.

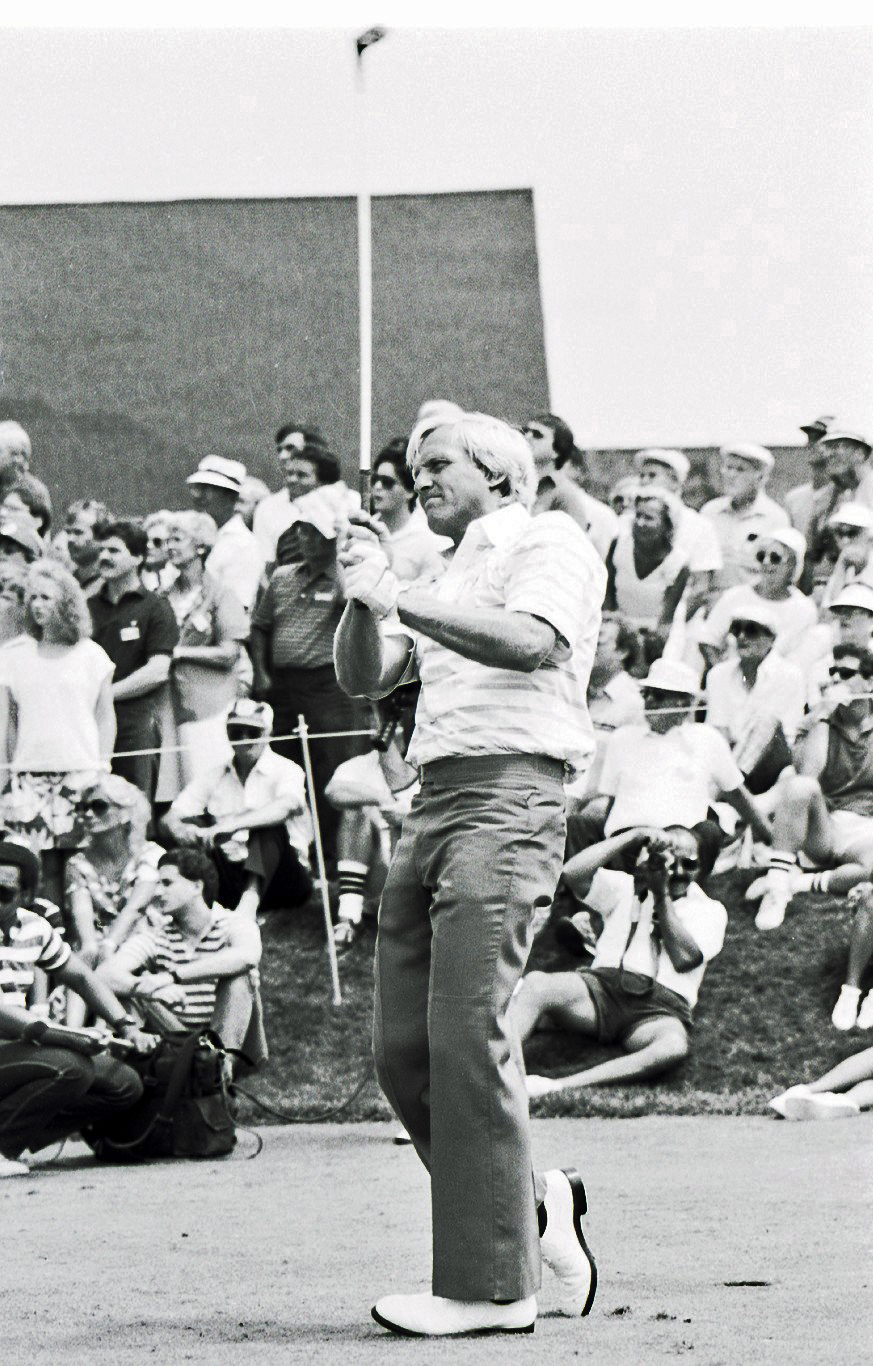
Greg Norman, two-time Canadian Open champion in 1984 and 1992.

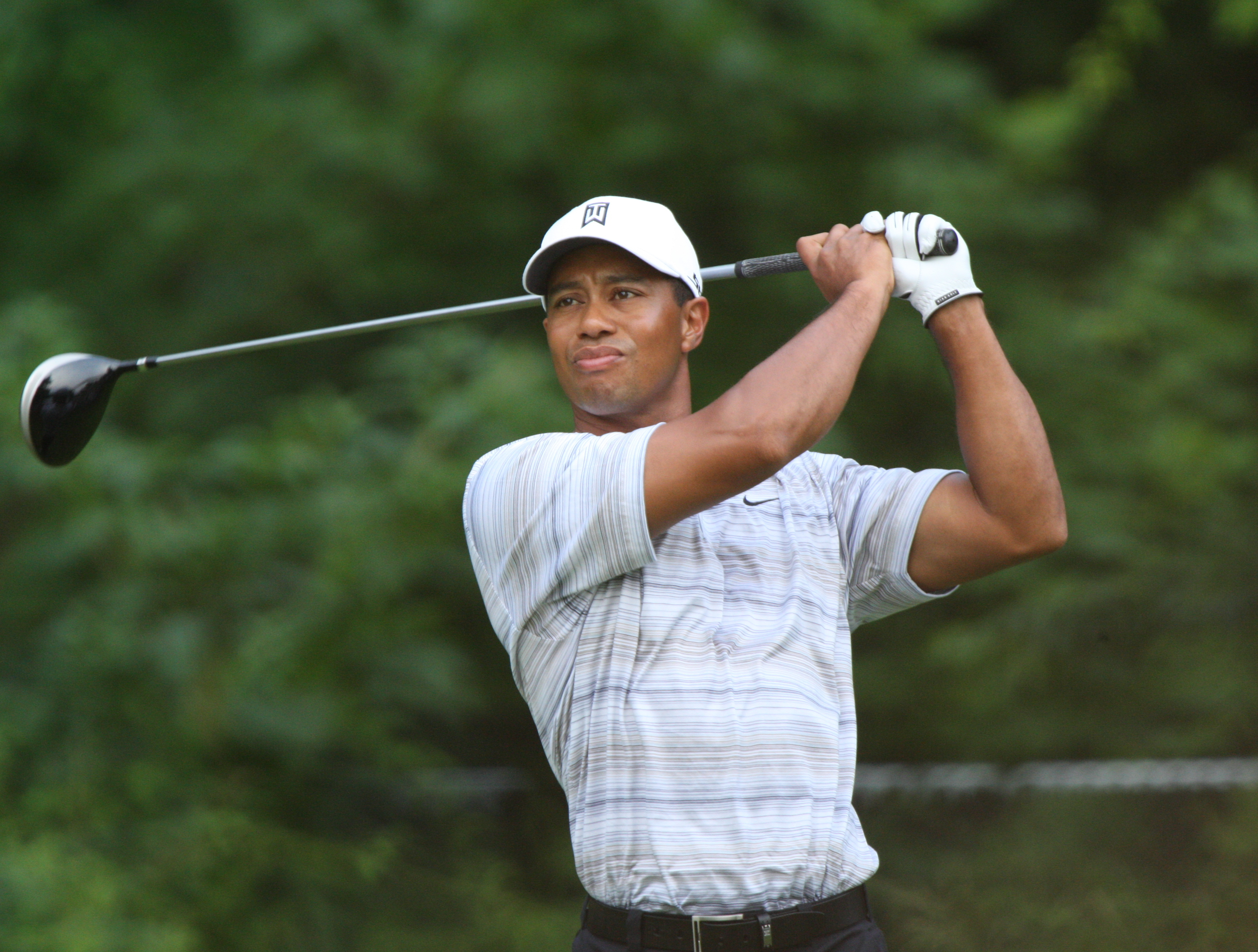
Tiger Woods, champion of the 2000 Canadian Open and winner of the Triple Crown along with Lee Trevino (1971).

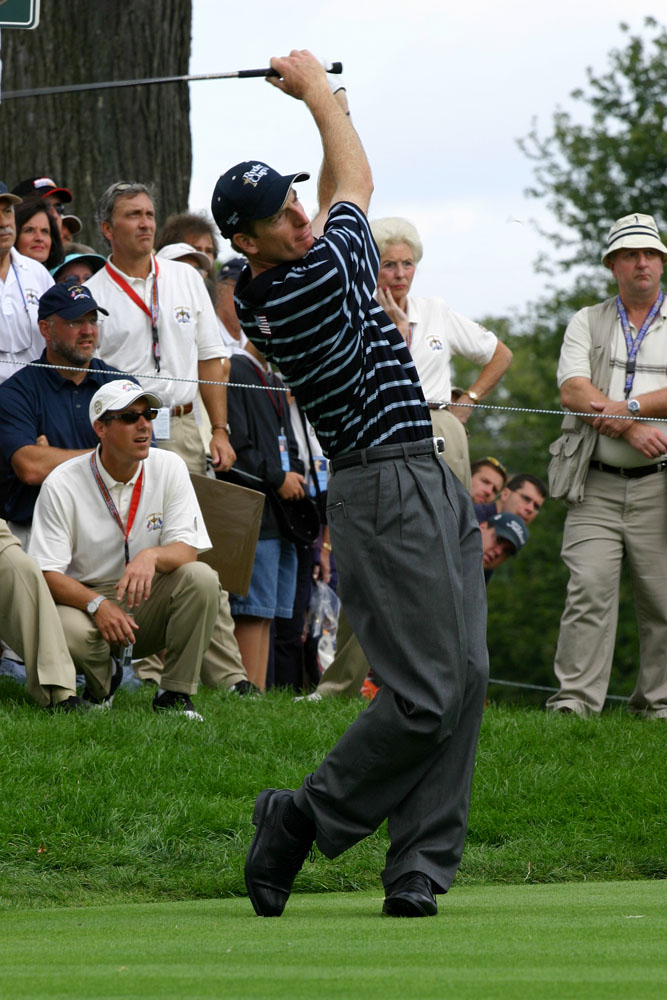
Jim Furyk, back-to-back Canadian Open winner in 2006–07, along with James Douglas Edgar, Leo Diegel, Sam Snead, Jim Ferrier, and Jhonattan Vegas

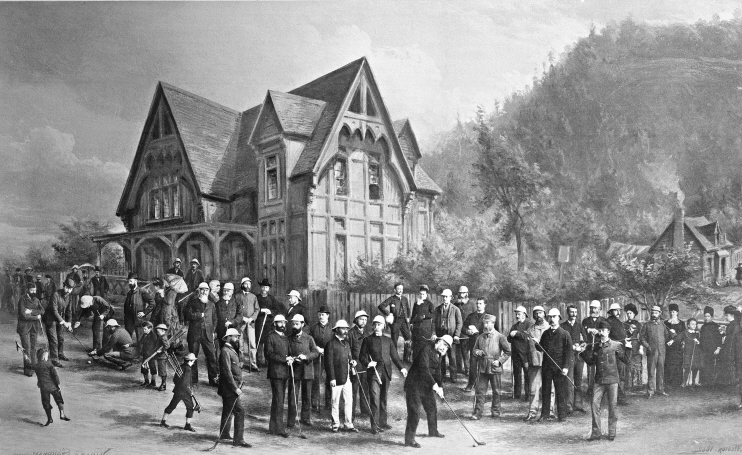
The Royal Montreal Golf Club, host of the first Canadian Open in 1904.

The Royal Montreal Golf Club, founded in 1873, is the oldest continuously running official golf club in North America. The club was the host of the first Canadian Open championship in 1904, and has been host to nine other Canadian Opens, at two locations, with the club moving to its current site on an island west of Montreal in 1959. The 1912 Canadian Open at the Rosedale Golf Club was famed American golfer Walter Hagen's first professional competition. In 1914, Karl Keffer won the event, being the last Canadian-born champion.

Englishman J. Douglas Edgar captured the 1919 championship at Hamilton Golf and Country Club by a record 16-stroke margin; 17-year-old amateur prodigy Bobby Jones (who was coached by Edgar) tied for second. The 1930 Canadian Open at Hamilton was another stellar tournament. Tommy Armour blazed his way around the course over the final 18 holes of regulation play, shooting a 64. Four-time champion Diegel and Armour went to a 36-hole playoff to decide the title. Armour shot 138 (69-69) to defeat Diegel by three strokes.

Toronto's St. Andrews Golf Club hosted the Open in 1936 and 1937 – the only course to hold back-to-back Opens until the creation of Glen Abbey – before it felt the impact of the growth of the city, and was ploughed under to allow for the creation of Highway 401. The Riverside Golf and Country Club of Rothesay, New Brunswick was host to the 1939 Canadian Open where Harold "Jug" McSpaden was champion. This was the only time the Open has been held in Atlantic Canada.

Gene Sarazen, Tommy Armour, and Walter Hagen at Lakeview Golf Club in Mississauga in 1934.

Scarboro Golf and Country Club in eastern Toronto was host to four Canadian Opens: 1940, 1947, 1953, and 1963. Three of these events were decided by one stroke, and the only time the margin was two shots was when Bobby Locke defeated Ed Oliver in 1947. With his win at Scarboro in 1947, the golfer from South Africa became just the second non-North American winner of the Canadian Open. Locke fired four rounds in the 60s to finish at 16-under-par, two strokes better than the American Oliver. After the prize presentation Locke was given a standing ovation, and was then hoisted to shoulders by fellow countrymen who were then residents of Canada.

In 1948, for the first time, the Canadian Open traveled west of Ontario, landing at Shaughnessy Heights Golf Club in Vancouver, British Columbia, where Charles Congdon sealed his victory on the 16th hole with a 150-yard bunker shot that stopped eight feet from the cup. The following birdie gave him the lead, and Congdon went on to win by three shots.

Mississaugua Golf & Country Club has hosted six Canadian Opens: 1931, 1938, 1942, 1951, 1965, and 1974. The 1951 Open tournament was won by Jim Ferrier, who successfully defended the title he had won at Royal Montreal a year earlier. Winnipeg's St. Charles Country Club hosted the 1952 Canadian Open, and saw Johnny Palmer set the 72-hole scoring record of 263, which still stands after more than 60 years. Palmer's rounds of 66-65-66-66 bettered the old 1947 mark set by Bobby Locke by five shots. In 1955, Arnold Palmer captured the Canadian Open championship, his first PGA Tour victory, at the Weston Golf and Country Club.

Montreal, Quebec's Laval-sur-le-Lac hosted the 1962 Open where Gary Player was disqualified after the first round, when he recorded the wrong score on the 10th hole. He had won the PGA Championship the week before. Californian Charlie Sifford attended the 1962 Canadian Open in part to raise the profile of African-American players on the PGA Tour. He was one of only 16 of the top 100 players on tour to play there in 1962.

Pinegrove Country Club played host to the Canadian Open in 1964 and 1969. Australian Kel Nagle edged Arnold Palmer and Raymond Floyd at the 1964 Open to become, aged almost 44 at the time, the oldest player to win the title. Five years later, Tommy Aaron fired a final-round 64 to force a playoff with 57-year-old Sam Snead. Aaron won the 18-hole playoff, beating Snead by two strokes (70-72).

The small town of Ridgeway, Ontario in the Niagara Peninsula was host of the 1972 Open at Cherry Hill Golf Club. A popular choice of venue, it drew rave reviews by the players, specifically the 1972 champion Gay Brewer, who called it the best course he had ever played in Canada, and Arnold Palmer, who suggested the Open be held there again the following year. In 1975, Tom Weiskopf won his second Open in three years in dramatic fashion at the Blue Course of Royal Montreal's new venue, defeating Jack Nicklaus on the first hole of a sudden-death playoff, after almost holing his short-iron approach. Windsor, Ontario's Essex Golf & Country Club was host of the 1976 Canadian Open, where Nicklaus again finished second, this time behind champion Jerry Pate. Essex came to the rescue late in the game, when it was determined that the newly built Glen Abbey was not yet ready to host the Canadian Open. The 1997 Open at Royal Montreal was the first time Tiger Woods ever missed a professional cut, after winning the Masters Tournament a few months before.

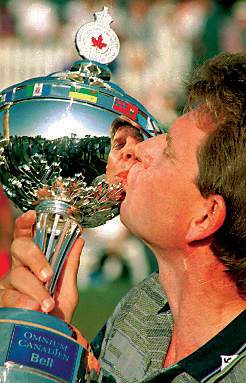
Nick Price's second Canadian Open win in 1994

Angus Glen Golf Club was host to two recent Canadian Opens, 2002 and 2007. In 2007 Jim Furyk became one of a few golfers who have won two consecutive Canadian Open titles, joining James Douglas Edgar, Leo Diegel, Sam Snead and Jim Ferrier. Angus Glen owns the unique distinction of having each of its two courses (North and South) host the Canadian Open.

Glen Abbey Golf Club of Oakville, Ontario has hosted 30 Open Championships (1977–79, 1981–96, 1998–2000, 2004, 2008–09, 2013, 2015–2018), and has crowned 24 different champions. The 11th hole at Glen Abbey is widely considered its signature hole, and begins the world-famous valley sequence of five holes from 11 to 15. The picturesque 11th is a 459-yard straightaway par-4, where players tee off 100 feet above the fairway, which ends at Sixteen Mile Creek, just short of the green. John Daly left his mark, and a plaque is permanently displayed on the back tee deck, recounting Daly's attempt to reach the green with his tee shot. His ball landed in the creek.

In 2000, Tiger Woods dueled with Grant Waite over the final 18 holes, before finally subduing the New Zealander on the 72nd hole with an exceptional shot. Holding a one-shot advantage, Woods found his tee shot in a fairway bunker, and after watching Waite put his second shot 30 feet from the hole, decided to go for the green. Woods hit a 6-iron which carried a lake and settled on the fringe just past the flag, which was 218 yards away, and then chipped to tap-in range for the title-clinching birdie. With the victory, Woods became only the second golfer to capture the U.S. Open, Open Championship and Canadian Open in the same year, earning him the Triple Crown trophy; he matched Lee Trevino (1971).

In 2009, Mark Calcavecchia scored nine consecutive birdies at the second round, breaking the PGA Tour record.

=== Canadian performances ===
Until 2023, a Canadian citizen had not won the Canadian Open since Pat Fletcher in 1954, and since 1914 for a player born in Canada. One of the most exciting conclusions ever seen at the Open came in 2004, extending that streak. Mike Weir had never done well at the Glen Abbey Golf Course, the site of the tournament that week. In fact, he had only made the cut once at any of the Opens contested at Glen Abbey. But Weir clawed his way to the top of the leaderboard by Friday. And by the third day at the 100th anniversary Open, he had a three-stroke lead, and many Canadians were buzzing about the possibility of the streak's end. Weir started off with a double bogey, but then went 4-under to keep his 3-stroke lead, with only eight holes left. Yet, with the expectations of Canadian observers abnormally high, there was another roadblock in the way of Mike Weir: Vijay Singh. Weir bogeyed three holes on the back nine but still had a chance to win the tournament with a 10-footer on the 72nd hole. When he missed the putt, the two entered a sudden-death playoff. Weir missed two more chances to win the tournament: a 25-foot putt for eagle on No. 18 on the first hole of sudden-death, and a 5-foot putt on No. 17, the second playoff hole. On the third playoff hole, Weir put his third shot into the water after a horrid drive and lay-up, and Singh was safely on the green in two. Singh won the Open and overtook Tiger Woods as the world's number one player.

Canadian David Hearn took a two-shot lead into the final round in 2015. He still had the lead as late as the 15th hole, but was being closely pursued by three players ranked near the top of the Official World Golf Ranking – Bubba Watson, Jim Furyk, and Jason Day. All four golfers had chances to win right until the end. Hearn was overtaken by champion Day's three consecutive birdies to close the round; Day finished one shot ahead of Watson, who also birdied the final three holes, narrowly missing an eagle attempt on a final hole greenside chip that would have tied. Day's fourth career Tour triumph came after he had just missed a potential tying putt on the final hole at the Open Championship the previous week. Hearn finished third, the best result by a Canadian since Weir's near-miss in 2004. In 2016, Canadian amateur Jared du Toit was only one stroke behind going into the final round, allowing him to play in the final group. He finished tied for ninth, three strokes behind eventual winner Jhonattan Vegas.

In 2023, Canadian Nick Taylor finally broke the drought for the home country, dating back 69 years to 1954, winning in dramatic fashion at the Oakdale Golf & Country Club. He birdied the final hole to tie Englishman Tommy Fleetwood (who made par) at 17 under par after 72 holes. On the fourth sudden death hole, Taylor made a 72-foot (22 m) eagle to capture the title.

== Event titles ==
Years	Event title
1904–1993, 2006–2007	Canadian Open
1994–2005	Bell Canadian Open
2008–present	RBC Canadian Open

== Winners ==
Year	Winner	Score	To par	Margin of victory	Runner(s)-up	Purse ($)	Winner's share ($)	Venue
RBC Canadian Open
2026	(United States) Bud Cauley	263	–17	2 strokes	(England) Matt Fitzpatrick	9,800,000	1,764,000	TPC Toronto at Osprey Valley
2025	(New Zealand) Ryan Fox	262	−18	Playoff	(United States) Sam Burns	9,800,000	1,764,000	TPC Toronto at Osprey Valley
2024	(Scotland) Robert MacIntyre	264	−16	1 stroke	(United States) Ben Griffin	9,400,000	1,692,000	Hamilton
2023	(Canada) Nick Taylor	271	−17	Playoff	(England) Tommy Fleetwood	9,000,000	1,620,000	Oakdale
2022	(Northern Ireland) Rory McIlroy (2)	261	−19	2 strokes	(United States) Tony Finau	8,700,000	1,566,000	St. George's
2021	Canceled due to the COVID-19 pandemic							
2020	Canceled due to the COVID-19 pandemic							
2019	(Northern Ireland) Rory McIlroy	258	−22	7 strokes	(Republic of Ireland) Shane Lowry (United States) Webb Simpson	7,600,000	1,368,000	Hamilton
2018	(United States) Dustin Johnson	265	−23	3 strokes	(South Korea) An Byeong-hun (South Korea) Kim Meen-whee	6,200,000	1,116,000	Glen Abbey
2017	(Venezuela) Jhonattan Vegas (2)	267	−21	Playoff	(United States) Charley Hoffman	6,000,000	1,080,000	Glen Abbey
2016	(Venezuela) Jhonattan Vegas	276	−12	1 stroke	(United States) Dustin Johnson (Scotland) Martin Laird (Spain) Jon Rahm	5,900,000	1,062,000	Glen Abbey
2015	(Australia) Jason Day	271	−17	1 stroke	(United States) Bubba Watson	5,800,000	1,044,000	Glen Abbey
2014	(South Africa) Tim Clark	263	−17	1 stroke	(United States) Jim Furyk	5,700,000	1,026,000	Royal Montreal
2013	(United States) Brandt Snedeker	272	−16	3 strokes	(United States) Jason Bohn (United States) Dustin Johnson (United States) Matt Kuchar (United States) William McGirt	5,600,000	1,008,000	Glen Abbey
2012	(United States) Scott Piercy	263	−17	1 stroke	(United States) Robert Garrigus (United States) William McGirt	5,200,000	936,000	Hamilton
2011	(United States) Sean O'Hair	276	−4	Playoff	(United States) Kris Blanks	5,200,000	936,000	Shaughnessy
2010	(Sweden) Carl Pettersson	266	−14	1 stroke	(United States) Dean Wilson	5,100,000	918,000	St. George's
2009	(Australia) Nathan Green	270	−18	Playoff	(South Africa) Retief Goosen	5,100,000	918,000	Glen Abbey
2008	(United States) Chez Reavie	267	−17	3 strokes	(United States) Billy Mayfair	5,000,000	900,000	Glen Abbey
Canadian Open
2007	(United States) Jim Furyk (2)	268	−16	1 stroke	(Fiji) Vijay Singh	5,000,000	900,000	Angus Glen (North)
2006	(United States) Jim Furyk	266	−14	1 stroke	(United States) Bart Bryant	5,000,000	900,000	Hamilton
Bell Canadian Open
2005	(United States) Mark Calcavecchia	275	−5	1 stroke	(United States) Ben Crane (United States) Ryan Moore	4,900,000	882,000	Shaughnessy
2004	(Fiji) Vijay Singh	275	−9	Playoff	(Canada) Mike Weir	4,500,000	810,000	Glen Abbey
2003	(United States) Bob Tway	272	−8	Playoff	(United States) Brad Faxon	4,200,000	756,000	Hamilton
2002	(United States) John Rollins	272	−16	Playoff	(United States) Neal Lancaster (United States) Justin Leonard	4,000,000	720,000	Angus Glen (South)
2001	(United States) Scott Verplank	266	−14	3 strokes	(United States) Bob Estes (United States) Joey Sindelar	3,800,000	684,000	Royal Montreal
2000	(United States) Tiger Woods (Note: Completed the PGA Tour's Triple Crown by also winning The Open Championship and the U.S. Open in the same year.)	266	−22	1 stroke	(New Zealand) Grant Waite	3,300,000	594,000	Glen Abbey
1999	(United States) Hal Sutton	275	−13	3 strokes	(United States) Dennis Paulson	2,500,000	450,000	Glen Abbey
1998	(United States) Billy Andrade	275	−13	Playoff	(United States) Bob Friend	2,200,000	396,000	Glen Abbey
1997	(United States) Steve Jones (2)	275	−5	1 stroke	(Australia) Greg Norman	1,500,000	270,000	Royal Montreal
1996	(United States) Dudley Hart	202	−14	1 stroke	(United States) David Duval	1,500,000	270,000	Glen Abbey
1995	(United States) Mark O'Meara	274	−14	Playoff	(United States) Bob Lohr	1,300,000	234,000	Glen Abbey
1994	(Zimbabwe) Nick Price (2)	275	−13	1 stroke	(United States) Mark Calcavecchia	1,300,000	234,000	Glen Abbey
Canadian Open
1993	(South Africa) David Frost	279	−9	1 stroke	(United States) Fred Couples	1,000,000	180,000	Glen Abbey
1992	(Australia) Greg Norman (2)	280	−8	Playoff	(United States) Bruce Lietzke	1,000,000	180,000	Glen Abbey
1991	(Zimbabwe) Nick Price	273	−15	1 stroke	(United States) David Edwards	1,000,000	180,000	Glen Abbey
1990	(United States) Wayne Levi	278	−10	1 stroke	(Australia) Ian Baker-Finch (United States) Jim Woodward	1,000,000	180,000	Glen Abbey
1989	(United States) Steve Jones	271	−17	2 strokes	(United States) Clark Burroughs (United States) Mark Calcavecchia (United States) Mike Hulbert	900,000	162,000	Glen Abbey
1988	(United States) Ken Green	275	−13	1 stroke	(United States) Bill Glasson (United States) Scott Verplank	900,000	135,000	Glen Abbey
1987	(United States) Curtis Strange (2)	276	−12	3 strokes	(South Africa) David Frost (United States) Jodie Mudd (Zimbabwe) Nick Price	600,000	108,000	Glen Abbey
1986	(United States) Bob Murphy	280	−8	3 strokes	(Australia) Greg Norman	600,000	108,000	Glen Abbey
1985	(United States) Curtis Strange	279	−9	2 strokes	(United States) Jack Nicklaus (Australia) Greg Norman	580,000	86,507	Glen Abbey
1984	(Australia) Greg Norman	278	−10	2 strokes	(United States) Jack Nicklaus	525,000	72,000	Glen Abbey
1983	(United States) John Cook	277	−7	Playoff	(United States) Johnny Miller	425,000	63,000	Glen Abbey
1982	(United States) Bruce Lietzke (2)	277	−7	2 strokes	(United States) Hal Sutton	425,000	76,500	Glen Abbey
1981	(England) Peter Oosterhuis	280	−4	1 stroke	(United States) Bruce Lietzke (United States) Jack Nicklaus (United States) Andy North	425,000	76,500	Glen Abbey
1980	(United States) Bob Gilder	274	−6	2 strokes	(United States) Jerry Pate (United States) Leonard Thompson	350,000	63,000	Royal Montreal
1979	(United States) Lee Trevino (3)	281	−3	3 strokes	(United States) Ben Crenshaw	350,000	63,000	Glen Abbey
1978	(United States) Bruce Lietzke	283	−1	1 stroke	(United States) Pat McGowan	250,000	50,000	Glen Abbey
1977	(United States) Lee Trevino (2)	280	−8	4 strokes	(England) Peter Oosterhuis	225,000	45,000	Glen Abbey
1976	(United States) Jerry Pate	267	−13	4 strokes	(United States) Jack Nicklaus	200,000	40,000	Essex
1975	(United States) Tom Weiskopf (2)	274	−6	Playoff	(United States) Jack Nicklaus	200,000	40,000	Royal Montreal
1974	(United States) Bobby Nichols	270	−10	4 strokes	(United States) John Schlee (United States) Larry Ziegler	200,000	40,000	Mississaugua
1973	(United States) Tom Weiskopf	278	−6	2 strokes	(United States) Forrest Fezler	175,000	35,000	Richelieu Valley
1972	(United States) Gay Brewer	275	−9	1 stroke	(United States) Sam Adams (United States) Dave Hill	150,000	30,000	Cherry Hill
1971	(United States) Lee Trevino	275	−13	Playoff	(United States) Art Wall Jr.	150,000	30,000	Richelieu Valley
1970	(United States) Kermit Zarley	279	−9	3 strokes	(United States) Gibby Gilbert	125,000	25,000	London Hunt
1969	(United States) Tommy Aaron	275	−13	Playoff	(United States) Sam Snead	125,000	25,000	Pine Grove
1968	(New Zealand) Bob Charles	274	−6	2 strokes	(United States) Jack Nicklaus	125,000	25,000	St. George's
1967	(United States) Billy Casper	279	−5	Playoff	(United States) Art Wall Jr.	100,000	30,000	Montreal Municipal
1966	(United States) Don Massengale	280	−4	3 strokes	(United States) Chi-Chi Rodríguez	100,000	20,000	Shaughnessy
1965	(United States) Gene Littler	273	−7	1 stroke	(United States) Jack Nicklaus	100,000	20,000	Mississaugua
1964	(Australia) Kel Nagle	277	−11	2 strokes	(United States) Arnold Palmer	50,000	7,500	Pine Grove
1963	(United States) Doug Ford (2)	280	−4	1 stroke	(United States) Al Geiberger	50,000	9,000	Scarboro
1962	(United States) Ted Kroll	278	−10	2 strokes	(United States) Charlie Sifford	30,000	4,300	Laval-sur-le-Lac
1961	(United States) Jacky Cupit	270	−10	5 strokes	(United States) Buster Cupit (United States) Dow Finsterwald (United States) Bobby Nichols	30,000	4,300	Niakwa
1960	(United States) Art Wall Jr.	269	−19	6 strokes	(United States) Bob Goalby (United States) Jay Hebert	25,000	3,500	St. George's
1959	(United States) Doug Ford	276	−12	2 strokes	(United States) Dow Finsterwald (United States) Art Wall Jr. (United States) Bo Wininger	25,000	3,500	Islesmere
1958	(United States) Wes Ellis	267	−13	1 stroke	(United States) Jay Hebert	25,000	3,500	Royal Mayfair
1957	(United States) George Bayer	271	−13	2 strokes	(United States) Bo Wininger	25,000	3,500	Westmount
1956	(United States) Doug Sanders (a)	273	−11	Playoff	(United States) Dow Finsterwald	15,000	2,400	Beaconsfield
1955	(United States) Arnold Palmer	265	−23	4 strokes	(United States) Jack Burke Jr.	15,000	2,400	Weston
1954	(Canada) Pat Fletcher	280	−8	4 strokes	(Canada) Gordie Brydson (United States) Bill Welch	15,000	3,000	Point Grey
1953	(United States) Dave Douglas	273	−11	1 stroke	(United States) Wally Ulrich	15,000	3,000	Scarboro
1952	(United States) Johnny Palmer	263	−25	11 strokes	(United States) Fred Haas (United States) Dick Mayer	15,000	3,000	St. Charles
1951	(Australia) Jim Ferrier (2)	273	−7	2 strokes	(United States) Fred Hawkins (United States) Ed Oliver	15,000	2,250	Mississaugua
1950	(Australia) Jim Ferrier	271	−17	3 strokes	(United States) Ted Kroll	10,000	2,000	Royal Montreal
1949	(United States) Dutch Harrison	271	−17	4 strokes	(Australia) Jim Ferrier	9,200	2,000	St. George's
1948	(United States) Charles Congdon	280	−4	3 strokes	(United States) Vic Ghezzi (United States) Ky Laffoon (United States) Dick Metz	9,000	2,000	Shaughnessy
1947	(South Africa) Bobby Locke	268	−16	2 strokes	(United States) Ed Oliver	10,000	2,000	Scarboro
1946	(United States) George Fazio	278	−6	Playoff	(United States) Dick Metz	9,000	2,000	Beaconsfield
1945	(United States) Byron Nelson	280	E	4 strokes	(United States) Herman Barron	10,000	2,000	Thornhill
1943–1944: No tournament due to World War II
1942	(United States) Craig Wood	275	−13	4 strokes	(United States) Mike Turnesa	3,000	1,000	Mississaugua
1941	(United States) Sam Snead (3)	274	−6	2 strokes	(Canada) Bob Gray	3,000	1,000	Lambton
1940	(United States) Sam Snead (2)	281	−3	Playoff	(United States) Jug McSpaden	3,000	1,000	Scarboro
1939	(United States) Jug McSpaden	282	+2	5 strokes	(United States) Ralph Guldahl	3,000	1,000	Riverside
1938	(United States) Sam Snead	277	−11	Playoff	(England) Harry Cooper	3,000	1,000	Mississaugua
1937	(England) Harry Cooper (2)	285	+5	2 strokes	(United States) Ralph Guldahl	3,200	1,000	St. Andrews Club
1936	(United States) Lawson Little	271	−9	8 strokes	(Scotland) Jimmy Thomson	3,000	1,000	St. Andrews Club
1935	(United States) Gene Kunes	280	−8	2 strokes	(United States) Vic Ghezzi	1,465	500	Summerlea
1934	(United States) Tommy Armour (3)	287	−1	2 strokes	(United States) Ky Laffoon	1,465	500	Lakeview
1933	(Australia) Joe Kirkwood Sr.	282	−2	8 strokes	(England) Harry Cooper (Scotland) Lex Robson	1,465	500	St. George's
1932	(United States) Harry Cooper	290	+2	3 strokes	(United States) Al Watrous	1,465	500	Ottawa Hunt
1931	(United States) Walter Hagen	292	+4	Playoff	(England) Percy Alliss	1,485	500	Mississaugua
1930	(United States) Tommy Armour (2)	273	−7	Playoff	(United States) Leo Diegel	1,475	500	Hamilton
1929	(United States) Leo Diegel (4)	274	−6	3 strokes	(United States) Tommy Armour	1,320	400	Kanawaki
1928	(United States) Leo Diegel (3)	282	−2	2 strokes	(England) Archie Compston (United States) Walter Hagen (Scotland) Macdonald Smith	1,320	400	Rosedale
1927	(United States) Tommy Armour	288	E	1 stroke	(Scotland) Macdonald Smith	1,320	400	Toronto GC
1926	(Scotland) Macdonald Smith	283	+3	3 strokes	(United States) Gene Sarazen	1,575	500	Royal Montreal
1925	(United States) Leo Diegel (2)	295	+11	2 strokes	(United States) Mike Brady	900	500	Lambton
1924	(United States) Leo Diegel	285	+1	2 strokes	(United States) Gene Sarazen	750	400	Mt. Bruno
1923	(Scotland) Clarence Hackney	295	+7	5 strokes	(United States) Tom Kerrigan	580	350	Lakeview
1922	(United States) Al Watrous	303	+19	1 stroke	(United States) Tom Kerrigan	450	250	Mt. Bruno
1921	(United States) William Trovinger	293	+5	3 strokes	(United States) Mike Brady	450	250	Toronto GC
1920	(England) James Douglas Edgar (2)	298	+10	Playoff	(United States) Tommy Armour (a) (Canada) Charlie Murray	600	300	Rivermead
1919	(England) James Douglas Edgar	278	−2	16 strokes	(England) Jim Barnes (United States) Bobby Jones (a) (Canada) Karl Keffer	435	200	Hamilton
1915–1918: No tournament due to World War I
1914	(Canada) Karl Keffer (2)	300	+12	1 stroke	(Canada) George Cumming	265	100	Toronto GC
1913	(Canada) Albert Murray (2)	295	+15	6 strokes	(United States) Jack Burke Sr. (Canada) Nicol Thompson	265	100	Royal Montreal
1912	(England) George Sargent	299	+19	1 stroke	(England) Jim Barnes	265	100	Rosedale
1911	(Canada) Charlie Murray (2)	314	+26	2 strokes	(Scotland) Davie Black	265	100	Royal Ottawa
1910	(United States) Daniel Kenny	303	+19	4 strokes	(Canada) George Lyon (a)	265	100	Lambton
1909	(Canada) Karl Keffer	309	+21	3 strokes	(Canada) George Cumming	265	100	Toronto GC
1908	(Canada) Albert Murray	300	+20	4 strokes	(England) George Sargent	225	80	Royal Montreal
1907	(England) Percy Barrett	306	+22	2 strokes	(Canada) George Cumming	245	80	Lambton
1906	(Canada) Charlie Murray	170	+26	1 stroke	(Canada) George Cumming (Scotland) Tom Reith (a) (Scotland) Alex Robertson	225	70	Royal Ottawa
1905	(Canada) George Cumming	148	+8	3 strokes	(England) Percy Barrett	225	60	Toronto GC
1904	(England) Jack Oke	156	+16	2 strokes	(England) Percy Barrett	170	60	Royal Montreal

Note: Green highlight indicates scoring records. Source

== Multiple and consecutive champions ==
This table lists the golfers who have won more than one Canadian Open.

Deceased golfer †
Major championship winner the same year as the Open win ‡
Major championship winner M

Player	Total	Years
(United States) Leo Diegel ‡†M	4	1924, 1925, 1928, 1929
(United States) Tommy Armour ‡†M	3	1927, 1930, 1934
(United States) Sam Snead M†	3	1938, 1940, 1941
(United States) Lee Trevino ‡M	3	1971, 1977, 1979
(Canada) Charles Murray †	2	1906, 1911
(Canada) Albert Murray †	2	1908, 1913
(Canada) Karl Keffer †	2	1909, 1914
(England) James Douglas Edgar †	2	1919, 1920
(England) Harry Cooper †	2	1932, 1937
(Australia) Jim Ferrier M†	2	1950, 1951
(United States) Doug Ford M†	2	1959, 1963
(United States) Tom Weiskopf ‡M	2	1973, 1975
(United States) Bruce Lietzke†	2	1978, 1982
(United States) Curtis Strange M	2	1985, 1987
(Australia) Greg Norman M	2	1984, 1992
(Zimbabwe) Nick Price ‡M	2	1991, 1994
(United States) Steve Jones M	2	1989, 1997
(United States) Jim Furyk M	2	2006, 2007
(Venezuela) Jhonattan Vegas	2	2016, 2017
(Northern Ireland) Rory McIlroy M	2	2019, 2022

== Champions by nationality ==
This table lists the total number of titles won by golfers of each nationality.

Country	Wins	Winners	First title	Last title
United States	74	59	1910	2018
England	8	6	1904	1981
Australia	8	6	1933	2015
Canada	8	5	1906	2023
Scotland	4	4	1905	2024
South Africa	3	3	1947	2014
New Zealand	2	2	1968	2025
Northern Ireland	2	1	2019	2022
Zimbabwe	2	1	1991	1994
Venezuela	2	1	2016	2017
Fiji	1	1	2004	
Sweden	1	1	2010	

== Trophies ==
The first trophy presented to the winner was donated by the Rivermead Golf Club who hosted the event in 1920. Before then the winner received a gold medal. The following trophies have been used since 1920:

- The Rivermead Challenge Cup 1920–1935
- The Seagram Gold Cup 1936–1970
- The Du Maurier Trophy 1971–1993
- The RBC Canadian Open Trophy 1994–present

Between 1936 and 1961 and since 2007, the Rivermead Challenge Cup has been presented to the Canadian professional with the lowest score.

== See also ==
- Triple Crown of Golf
- Open golf tournament
