= Pat Fletcher =

Canadian golfer

Personal information
- Full name: Patrick Oswald Fletcher
- Nationality: Canada
- Born: June 18, 1916 Clacton-on-Sea, England
- Died: July 21, 1985 (aged 69) Victoria, British Columbia, Canada

Career
- Sport: Golf
- Status: Professional
- Professional wins: At least 8

Number of wins by tour
- PGA Tour: 1

Best results in major championships
- Masters Tournament: T32: 1955
- PGA Championship: DNP
- U.S. Open: DNP
- The Open Championship: DNP

Achievements and awards
- Canada's Sports Hall of Fame: 1975
- Canadian Golf Hall of Fame: 1976

Patrick Oswald Fletcher (June 18, 1916 – July 21, 1985) was a Canadian professional golfer.

== Career ==
In 1954, at the Point Grey Golf Club in Vancouver, he became the first Canadian since 1914 to win the Canadian Open. He was the last Canadian to win the tournament until Nick Taylor's victory in 2023.

Fletcher moved to Montreal to become the head professional at the Royal Montreal Golf Club, and with his sons Ted and Allan, started the Fletcher sportswear and equipment company. He also won the 1952 Canadian PGA Championship.

== Awards and honors ==
- In 1975, Fletcher was inducted into Canada's Sports Hall of Fame.
- In 1976, Fletcher was inducted into the Canadian Golf Hall of Fame.

== Professional wins ==
- 1947 Saskatchewan Open
- 1948 Saskatchewan Open
- 1951 Saskatchewan Open
- 1952 Canadian PGA Championship
- 1954 Canadian Open
- 1956 Quebec Spring Open
- 1957 Quebec Spring Open
- 1968 Canadian PGA Seniors

== Team appearances ==
- Canada Cup (representing Canada): 1955
- Hopkins Trophy (representing Canada): 1952, 1953, 1954, 1955
