= La Vallée du Richelieu Golf Club =

Private golf club in Quebec, Canada

Coordinates: 45.5969°N 73.2842°W

La Vallée du Richelieu Golf Club is a private golf club in Sainte-Julie, Quebec, Canada. There are two 18-hole golf courses at the golf club, Le Rouville and Le Verchères.

== Le Rouville ==
Le Rouville is an 18-hole course which opened in 1967. Le Rouville has hosted the Canadian Open in 1971 and 1973, the Telus World Skins Game in 1994, the Peter Jackson Classic in 1979, the AT&T Canada Senior Open Championship in 1999, and the 2013 Montreal Championship on the Champions Tour.

== Le Verchères ==
Le Verchères is an 18-hole course which opened in 1965, designed by William F. Gordon. It is a par 72 course and 6,950 yards. It hosted the 2012 Montreal Championship on the Champions Tour.
