= Quebec Championship =

Coordinates: 46.48°N 71.11°W

Quebec Championship Championnat de Québec
Tournament information
- Location: Lévis, Quebec, Canada
- Established: 2010
- Courses: Golf La Tempête (2014–2015); La Vallée du Richelieu G.C. (2012–2013); Club de Golf Fontainebleau (2010–11)
- Par: 72
- Length: 7,203 yards (6,586 m)
- Tour: Champions Tour
- Format: Stroke play - 54 holes
- Prize fund: US$1,600,000
- Month played: September
- Final year: 2014

Tournament record score
- Aggregate: 195 John Cook (2011)
- To par: −21 John Cook (2011)

Final champion
- (United States) Wes Short Jr.

Location in Canada

The Quebec Championship (French: Championnat de Québec) (Note: The literal translation of the French name of the tournament is "Quebec City Championship". However, the tournament organizers use "Quebec Championship" as the event's English-language name.) was a professional golf tournament on the Champions Tour, a professional tour for golfers 50 and older operated by the PGA Tour. A 54-hole event, it debuted in 2010 as the Montreal Championship (French: Championnat de Montréal) at the Club de Golf Fontainebleau in the Montreal suburb of Blainville, Quebec, Canada. The course was a par-72 at 7,105 yards (6,497 m)

For 2012, the tournament moved a week earlier in the schedule and relocated to the Vercheres course at La Vallee du Richelieu Golf Club in Sainte-Julie, Quebec. The tournament remained at La Vallee du Richelieu in 2013, but changed its date to September and switched to the Rouville course.

The 2013 edition was the last in the Montreal area. The event moved to the Quebec City area for 2014, and is now held at Golf La Tempête in Lévis. The 2014 edition is the first PGA Tour-sanctioned event held in the Quebec City area since the 1956 Labatt Open.

== Winners ==
| Year | Dates | Champion | Winning score | To par | Margin of victory | Runner-up | Purse (US$) | Winner's share |
|---|---|---|---|---|---|---|---|---|
| 2015 | Sep 4–6 | Canceled | | | | | | |
| 2014 | Sep 5–7 | (United States) Wes Short Jr. | 69-68-64=201 | −15 | 1 stroke | (United States) Scott Dunlap | 1,600,000 | 240,000 |
| 2013 | Sep 6–8 | (Mexico) Esteban Toledo | 73-69-69=211 | −5 | Playoff | (United States) Kenny Perry | 1,600,000 | 240,000 |
| 2012 | Jun 22–24 | (United States) Mark Calcavecchia | 69-67-64=200 | −16 | 4 strokes | (United States) Brad Bryant | 1,800,000 | 270,000 |
| 2011 | Jul 1–3 | (United States) John Cook | 63-66-66=195 | −21 | 3 strokes | (Taiwan) Lu Chien-soon | 1,800,000 | 270,000 |
| 2010 | Jul 2–4 | (United States) Larry Mize | 67-68-64=199 | −17 | 1 stroke | (United States) John Cook | 1,800,000 | 270,000 |
