= Triple Crown (golf) =

Golf term for winning three major golf championships in the same year

The Triple Crown of Golf is the winning of three major golf championships in the same year. This feat has been accomplished only twice in modern golf history:

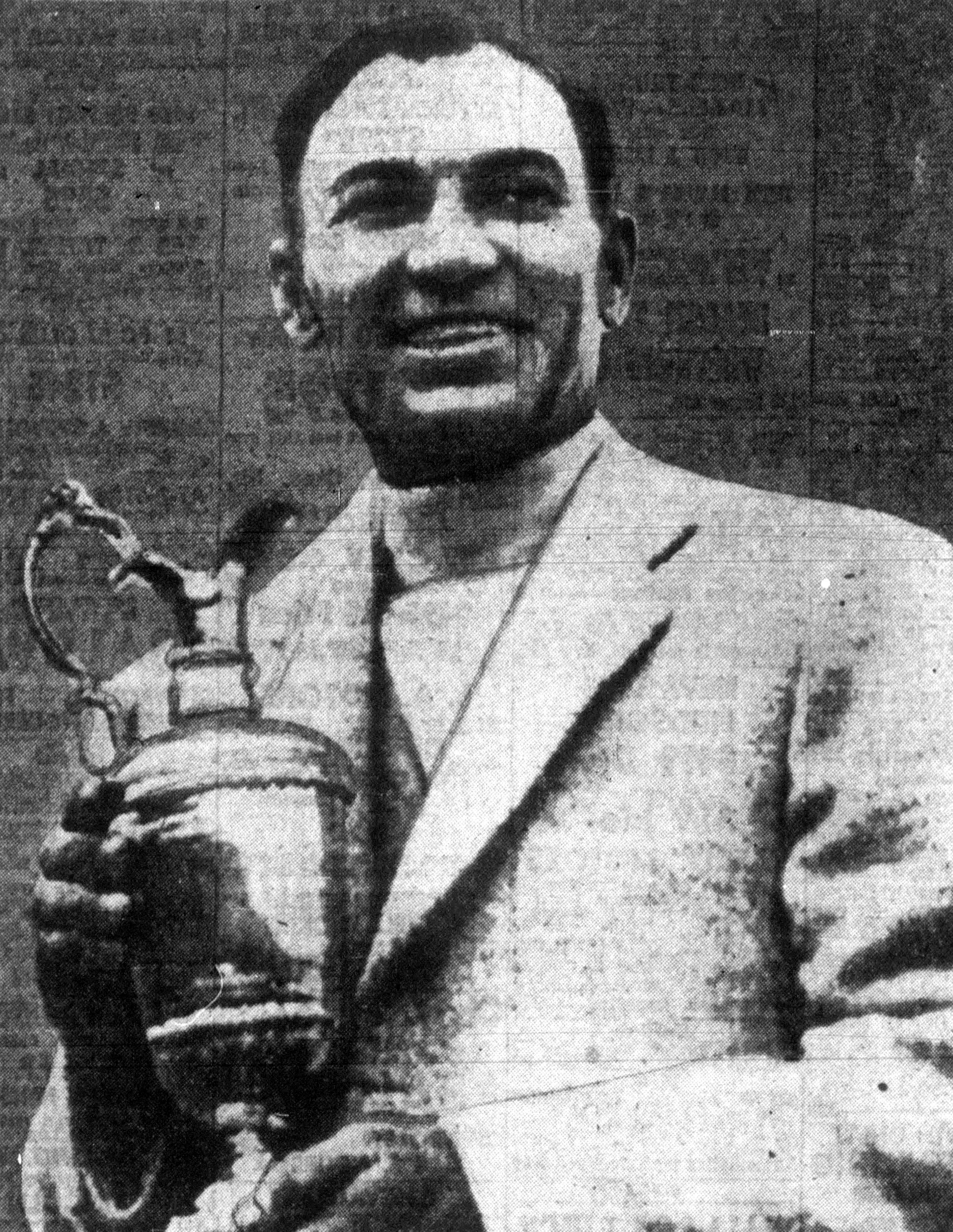
Ben Hogan holding the Claret Jug in 1953

- In 1953, Ben Hogan won the Masters, the U.S. Open, and The Open Championship, which was touted as the Triple Crown. The dates of the PGA Championship overlapped with The Open that year, which made winning the Grand Slam impossible. The PGA Championship was also a match play event during that era. After winning The Open (the third major of the year), Hogan was honored with a ticker tape parade in New York.
- In 2000, Tiger Woods won the last three majors (the U.S. Open, The Open, and the PGA Championship), which was called "Tiger's Triple Crown." Woods also held the PGA Tour's Triple Crown that year (see below) and would win the 2001 Masters, which was the next major, for a non-calendar year Grand Slam, the first time it has happened in the modern professional game.

The Triple Crown has also been referred to:

- Winning the PGA Tour's three oldest events in the same year: The Open Championship (1860), the U.S. Open (1895), and the Canadian Open (1904). This combination of wins has been called the Triple Crown of the PGA Tour. There have been two holders of this Triple Crown: Lee Trevino in 1971 and Tiger Woods in 2000. There are only six players to carry the career triple crown, winning the three national championship throughout their playing career, Woods, Trevino, Tommy Armour, Walter Hagen, Arnold Palmer, and Rory McIlroy.
- Winning the world's three oldest golf tournaments in the same year: The Open Championship (1860), the U.S. Open (1895), and the South African Open (1903). No one has won this Triple Crown. Only two players, Gary Player and Ernie Els, have won all three of these events throughout their playing career.

In South Africa:

- Winning the three major domestic championships in the same year: the South African Open, the South African Masters*, and the South African PGA Championship. This Triple Crown has been held by Gary Player in 1979 and Ernie Els in 1992.

*Note: The South African Masters has been discontinued since 2011.

In Australia:

- Winning the three major domestic championships in the same year: the Australian Open, the Australian Masters*, and the Australian PGA Championship. This Triple Crown was held by Robert Allenby in 2005.

*Note: The Australian Masters has been discontinued since 2015.

== See also ==
- Grand Slam (golf)
