= Molson's Canadian Open =

Golf tournament formerly on the LPGA Tour

The Molson's Canadian Open was a golf tournament on the LPGA Tour, played only in 1969. It was played at the Shaughnessy Golf & Country Club in Vancouver, British Columbia, Canada. Carol Mann won the event by three strokes over Sandra Post and Kathy Whitworth.
