= Credit Indian Village =

Settlement in Ontario, Canada

Coordinates: 43.5511021°N 79.6185973°W

The Credit Indian Village was a settlement on the banks of the Credit River in modern-day Mississauga, Ontario. The settlement was initially founded in 1826 by a band of Mississaugas of the Credit who had converted to Christianity. Notable figures in the early settlement include Peter Jones, the son of Ontario surveyor Augustus Jones and his wife, Tuhbenahneequay.

In 1847, the Mississaugas were evicted from the site by the Ontario government due to pressure from neighbouring white settlers; the tribe was forced to relocate to their current home, the Mississaugas of the Credit First Nation, after being gifted land from the Six Nations of the Grand River.

Since 1905, the original site of the village has been occupied by the Mississaugua Golf & Country Club.
