= St. George's Golf and Country Club =

Golf course in Toronto, Ontario

Coordinates: 43.675°N 79.531°W

- Interactive map of St. George's Golf and Country Club

Club information
- Location: Etobicoke, Toronto, Ontario, Canada
- Established: 1929
- Total holes: 18
- Tournaments: Canadian Open
- Designed by: Stanley Thompson
- Par: 71 (Note: Plays as a par 70 during the Canadian Open.)
- Length: 7,025 yards (6,424 m) (Black tees)
- Course rating: 73.7 (Black tees)
- Course record: 60 – Carl Pettersson (2010), Justin Rose (2022)

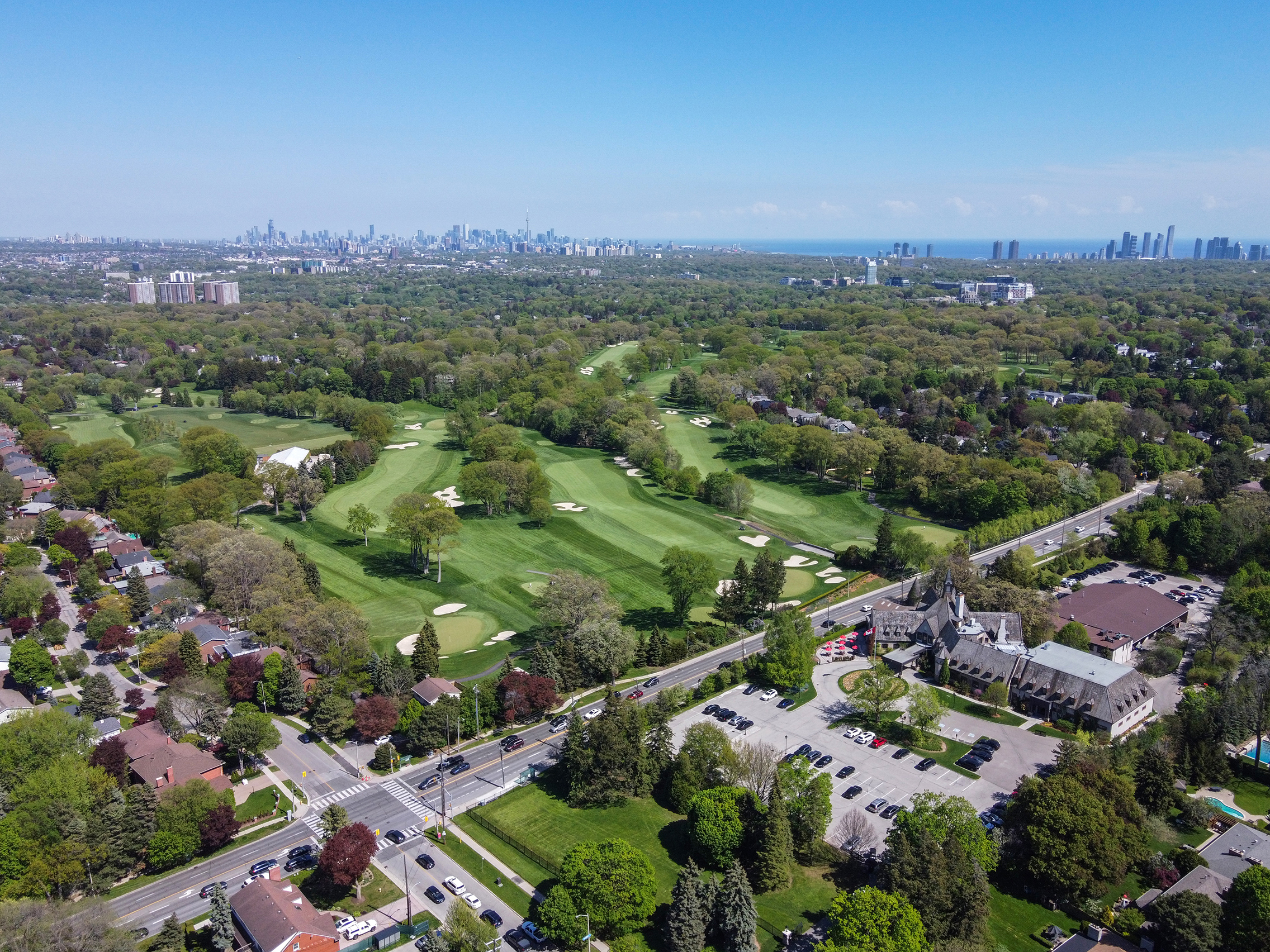
Aerial view of St. George's Golf and Country Club

St. George's Golf and Country Club (originally The Royal York Golf Club) is a golf course and country club located in Etobicoke, Toronto, Ontario, Canada in the west end neighbourhood of Islington.

== History ==
The club was originally established in 1909 by Robert Home Smith from Stratford-upon-Avon, England who purchased the area of land which was located on the banks of the Humber River.

The club was built in co-ordination with the construction of the Royal York Hotel, which was being designed in downtown Toronto, with the plan being that the golf facilities would be necessary for the guests staying in the hotel. Leading the construction of the hotel was Sir Edward Wentworth Beatty, who was known to be acquainted with Smith. Leading construction of the golf course was Stanley Thompson, the leading Canadian golf course architect. At its Islington Avenue location, the course opened in 1929. The course, under the Royal York name, hosted the Canadian Open in 1933. However, in 1935 Smith died, and his executor trustee Godfrey S. Pettit, became president of the club.

In 1946 the name of the country club was changed from The Royal York Golf Club to St. George's Golf and Country Club as a result of the financial arrangement with the Canadian Pacific Railway (of which Beatty was president) ending. The club has been rated several times in the top three of Canada and amongst the top 100 in the world

St. George's has hosted the Canadian Open six times:

- 1933: won by Joe Kirkwood, Sr.
- 1949: won by Dutch Harrison
- 1960: won by Art Wall Jr.
- 1968: won by Bob Charles
- 2010: won by Carl Pettersson
- 2022: won by Rory McIlroy

The course has been extended in length, to 7,025 yards (6,424 m), par 71, to attract more Canadian Open events. While the course is universally regarded as outstanding, issues of logistics, access, and available space in a crowded neighbourhood make hosting a tournament of this magnitude somewhat problematic. Logistical steps taken to host the Open include closing the busy thoroughfare Islington Avenue before and during the tournament, using the nearby Islington Golf Club's practice facilities, shuttling the players back and forth to Islington Golf Club, limiting the number of spectators who can access the course, and starting play for the first two rounds from the 1st and 9th tees (normally it would be the 1st and 10th tees). St. George's has been announced as the host for the Canadian Open in 2022.

The club has also hosted the Canadian Women's Open five times: 1975, 1978, 1980, 1982, and 1984. The course was also the host venue for golf of the 2017 Invictus Games.

The 2020 RBC Canadian Open tournament, which had been scheduled at the club, was cancelled because of the COVID-19 pandemic in Ontario. After a two-year hiatus due to the COVID-19 pandemic, the Canadian Open returned in 2022.

== Curling ==
In 2020, members of the golf club voted to discontinue curling operations at St. George's, citing that curling was "no longer a good fit for golf". Since then, the curling space has been replaced by an indoor golf facility and pickle ball court.

== Notes ==
Preceded by Glen Abbey Golf Course	Host of the Canadian Open; 2010	Succeeded by Shaughnessy Golf & Country Club
