= Lex Robson =

Scottish-Canadian golfer

Personal information
- Full name: Alexander Lawrie Robson
- Nationality: Scotland; Canada
- Born: February 7, 1898 Edinburgh, Scotland
- Died: January 27, 1974 (aged 75) Peterborough, Ontario, Canada

Career
- Sport: Golf
- Status: Professional
- Professional wins: 8

Achievements and awards
- Ontario Golf Hall of Fame: 2008

Alexander Lawrie Robson (February 7, 1898 – January 27, 1974) was a Scottish-Canadian professional golfer.

Robson was born in Edinburgh, Scotland. Having moved to Canada, he had a successful tournament career, highlighted by winning the Canadian PGA Championship in 1932, and finishing as runner-up in the Canadian Open in 1933. He also won the Millar Trophy, originally awarded for the Ontario PGA Match Play championship and later the Canadian PGA Match Play, on six occasions.

In 1934, as recognition for his consistently good play, Robson was invited to compete in the inaugural Masters Tournament but he was unable to play. In 2008 he was inducted into the Ontario Golf Hall of Fame.

Robson served as the head professional at several golf clubs in Ontario, most notably at Islington Golf Club in Etobicoke for many years until 1939, when he moved to Kawartha Golf & Country Club in Peterborough where he remained for 25 years.

== Professional wins ==
- 1931 Millar Trophy
- 1932 Canadian PGA Championship, Millar Trophy
- 1934 Millar Trophy
- 1935 Ontario Open, Millar Trophy
- 1936 Millar Trophy
- 1939 Millar Trophy
