= Mount Bruno Country Club =

Coordinates: 45.5299°N 73.3140°W

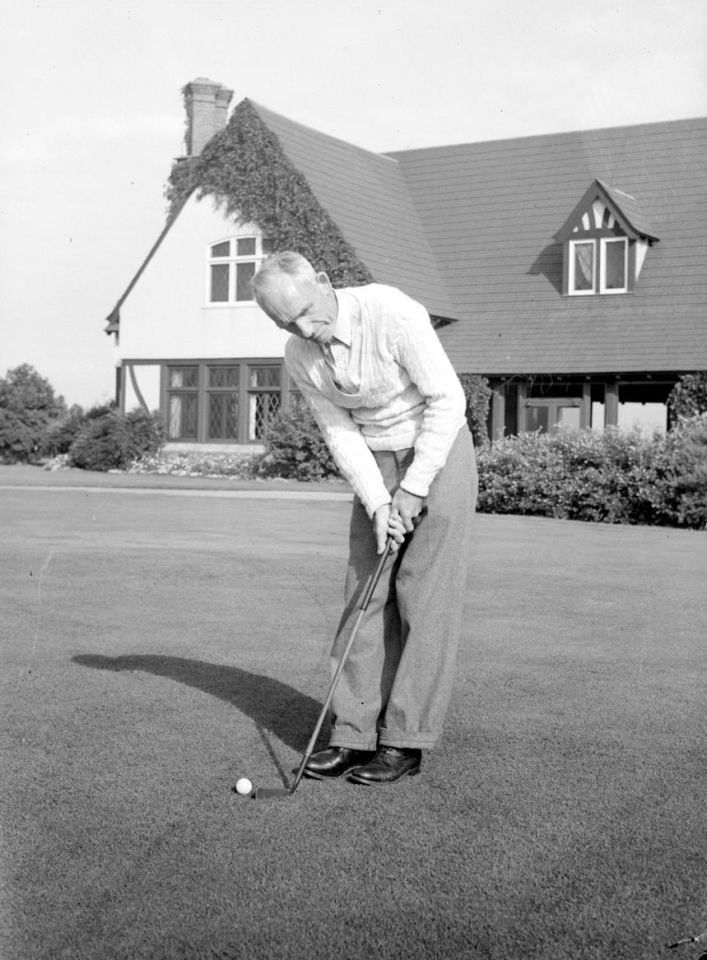
Frank Glass near the cottage of the Mount Bruno Golf Club, in 1946

Mount Bruno Golf Club is a private club located in Saint-Bruno-de-Montarville, Quebec, Canada. It is reputed to be one of the most exclusive golf clubs in Canada, and it has hosted the Canadian Open twice: in 1922, when it was won by Al Watrous, and in 1924, won by Leo Diegel.

The course was originally designed by Willie Park Jr., later renovated by Stanley Thompson and Tom McBroom. Its mountain terrain is difficult because the ball often breaks in the opposite direction from what golfers are expecting. The signature hole is the 14th, a 435-yard, par 4, which is located at the highest point on the course and offers a view of the course and the surrounding valley. The elevated tee plays downhill and then requires an uphill approach to the elevated green, which slopes to the left and is protected by sand on the right and large bumps on the left side.

== See also ==
- List of golf courses in Quebec
