= Karl Keffer =

Canadian golfer

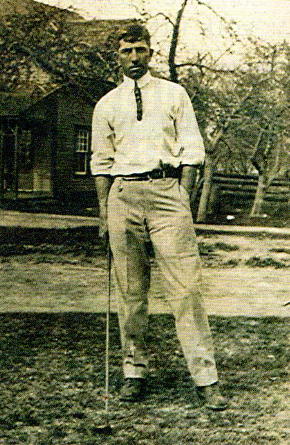

Personal information
- Full name: Karl Kaspar Keffer
- Nationality: Canada
- Born: 1882 Tottenham, Ontario, Canada
- Died: October 22, 1955 (aged 73) Aylmer, Quebec, Canada

Career
- Sport: Golf
- Status: Professional
- Professional wins: 4

Achievements and awards
- Canadian Golf Hall of Fame: 1986

Karl Kaspar Keffer (1882 – October 22, 1955) was a Canadian professional golfer. He won the Canadian Open twice, in 1909 and 1914, and remained the only Canadian-born winner of the national open until 2023.

Keffer was born in Tottenham, Ontario. He was the head professional at the Royal Ottawa Golf Club for over thirty years until his retirement in 1943 due to ill health, and was a founder member of the PGA of Canada. Until 1942, he also worked as the professional at Jekyll Island Club on Jekyll Island, Georgia during the winters. His biggest achievements as a tournament player came in the national open championship, which he won twice, in 1909 and 1914, and finished as runner-up in 1919. He also won the provincial opens of Manitoba and Quebec.

Keffer has been widely recognised for his achievements and contributions to golf, highlighted by his induction into the Canadian Golf Hall of Fame in 1986. He has also been inducted into the PGA of Canada, Ontario Golf and Quebec Golf halls of fame.

== Professional wins ==
- 1909 Canadian Open
- 1914 Canadian Open
- 1919 Manitoba Open
- 1926 Quebec Open
