= Essex Golf & Country Club =

Canadian golf course in LaSalle, Ontario

- Location within Southern Ontario
- 42.22°N 83.08°W

Club information
- Location: 7555 Matchette Rd; Windsor, Ontario; N9J 2S4
- Established: 1902; 124 years ago
- Type: Private
- Total holes: 18
- Tournaments: Canadian Open (1976) du Maurier Classic (1998); AT&T Canada Senior Open Championship (2002)
- Website: www.essexgolf.com/Home
- Designed by: Donald J. Ross
- Par: 71
- Length: 6,703 yards (6,129 m)
- Course record: 60 - Walter Morgan (2002)

Essex Golf & Country Club is a private, 18-hole championship golf course located in LaSalle, Ontario, south of Windsor.

== History ==
The club was established in 1902 under the name of Oak Ridge Golf Club, and from that date until 1910 played over a 3400 yard nine-hole course on the Farwell Farm in Sandwich. Mr. George Mair, the club's founder, was president. In the fall of 1910 the club purchased the Colonel Alan Prince Farm in the town of Sandwich on Center Road, now Prince Road at its intersection with College Avenue, not far from the Ambassador Bridge linking Windsor and Detroit. The property consisted of 40 acres (160,000 m^{2}) of land and a nine-hole golf course was constructed in 1911. During construction, members were invited to play at the Walkerville Country Club, which started out as a tennis club, situated at the present site of Walkerville Collegiate in the Town of Walkerville (now part of Windsor) founded in 1890 by the distiller Hiram Walker. Mr. Hiram W Walker, a nephew of Hiram Walker and Mayor of Walkerville, became a member of Essex in 1914.

=== Merger ===
The Oak Ridge Golf Club merged with the Walkerville Club and the name was changed to the "Essex County Golf & Country Club." The nine-hole course was open for play in the spring of 1912 and was in use until the fall of 1914 when, additional land having been procured, an 18-hole course was built. During 1917 more land was purchased and the course was remodeled under the direction of Detroit golf course professional Ernest Way to make a longer 18-hole 5,705-yard (5,217 m) course. The growth of the community resulted in the club losing its country club character, and the decision was made to relocate to a more rural setting. In the mid-1920s 126 acres (0.51 km^{2}) of wooded farmland was purchased in the Town of LaSalle. (Additional land was acquired along the north and south borders in the 1960s and 1970s to bring the total average to approximately 138 acres). The services of the golf course architect, Donald J. Ross was retained and construction of a 6,525-yard (5,966 m) course was commenced in 1928. Construction was supervised by John Gray who, like Ross, was a native born Scotsman. Gray, who had been a greenskeeper at the Prince Road course, remained so at the new course until his death in 1958 at age 73. Gray was a charter member of the United States National Greenskeepers Association when the organization was formed in Toledo, Ohio in 1926.

The new clubhouse was modeled on an English country house and was designed by the Windsor architectural firm of Sheppard, Nichols & Masson. It opened on July 1, 1929. When the Detroit District Golf Association was formed in 1919 by 14 clubs, several of the founding clubs had Ross Courses, among which was Essex. It continued the connection through the years and still belongs to the Golf Association of Michigan as well as the Golf Association of Ontario and the Royal Canadian Golf Association.

=== Fame ===
In the early 1930s, the club encountered financial difficulties and sought relief from the courts on interest payments. During the next several years, mutually satisfactory arrangements were made with the bondholders and in 1948 the club obtained a new charter and started to operate as the Essex Golf & Country Club on June 1, 1949.

Golfers who played regularly at Essex included Walter Hagen, Al Watrous and Horton Smith, who later worked as club professionals in Detroit. Babe Didrikson Zaharias was reportedly a frequent visitor during the 1930s.[citation needed]

In 1915 Essex admitted Miss Kate Duncan who became the first Lady Member. By 1921, Essex had 10 Lady Members. Miss Duncan remained a member until her death in 1967. Kate Duncan Day was established in her memory.

=== Tournaments and Championships ===
As a tournament site, Essex has provided a strong challenge to some of the top players in the world. It hosted the Ontario Open Championship in 1922, 1949 and 1951, the 1934 Ontario Amateur, the Canadian Women's Amateur in 1964 and, at the top of the list, the Canadian Open in 1976. The latter event was won by Jerry Pate, who established the official competitive course record of 63, shooting 69-67-68-63 = 267 (13 under par), over a field that included Arnold Palmer, Jack Nicklaus, Gary Player, Tom Watson, Raymond Floyd, Johnny Miller, Jim Colbert, Tom Weiskopf, Tom Kite, Ben Crenshaw, Gene Littler, Bruce Lietzke and virtually all of the best tournament players of the day. (Pate's record stood until 2002)

The golf world's attention was once again focused on Essex when the club hosted the 1998 du Maurier Classic, the fourth "Major" on the LPGA Tour. The $1.2 million (US) tournament was held from July 27 to August 2, a great financial success, recorded as one of the best run du Maurier events ever which broke an all-time attendance record in the 25-year history of the event. The $180,000 (US) first place prize was won by Brandie Burton with an 18 under par 270, one stroke better than Annika Sörenstam.

The highlight of the centennial year was the hosting of the PGA Senior Tour's 1.6 million AT&T Canada Senior Open Championship, placing the club as one of the only three Canadian golf clubs to have hosted a PGA Tour, LPGA Tour and a Senior PGA Tour event. Tom Jenkins won the tournament over Bruce Lietzke, Morris Hatalsky and Walter Morgan. A new course record was set when Walter Morgan recorded an 11 under par 60 in the second round of the tournament, improving on the 63 shot by Jerry Pate in the 1976 Canadian Open.

=== Renovation ===
In 1998, Essex also undertook a massive renovation project to improve the club's facilities, practice range, parking, course maintenance facility and a total refurbishment of the clubhouse facilities. In 2002, the club's 100th year, Essex embarked on a major kitchen improvement plan, enlarging and equipping the existing facility with the most up-to-date conveniences. In addition, the entire roof of the structure was replaced. During 2003, work was completed on a new million-dollar irrigation system. Essex was also privileged to host the Seniors Triangular Matches composed of teams from Canada and the United States and an international team from the British Isles. The fall of 2005 saw the commencement of the Renaissance Plan, a project which included restoring the fairways and greens back to their original Donald Ross design as well as a rebuilding and restoration of the bunkers. The project was completed in the fall of 2006.
