= Glen Abbey Golf Course =

Privately-owned golf course in Oakville, Ontario Canada

Glen Abbey Golf Club
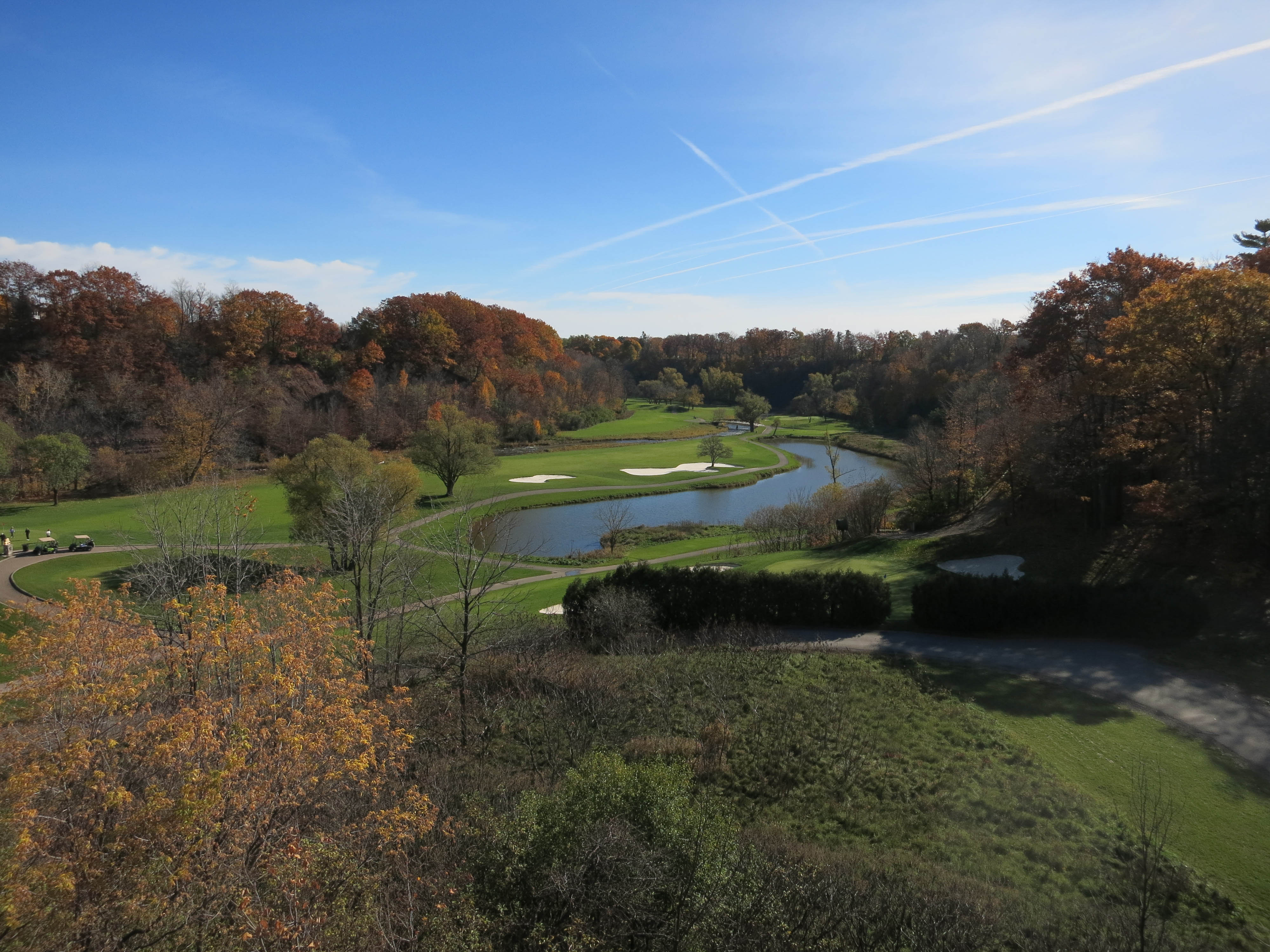
- Glen Abbey golf course in November 2016

- Location within Southern Ontario
- 43.452°N 79.719°W

Club information
- Location: 1333 Dorval Drive; Oakville, Ontario; L6M 4G2
- Elevation: 120 metres (390 ft)
- Established: 1976; 50 years ago
- Owner: Clublink
- Total holes: 18
- Tournaments: Canadian Open (Note: Glen Abbey Golf Club has hosted the Canadian Open on thirty occasions, in 1977, 1978, 1979, 1981, 1982, 1983, 1984, 1985, 1986, 1987, 1988, 1989, 1990, 1991, 1992, 1993, 1994, 1995, 1996, 1998, 1999, 2000, 2004, 2008, 2009, 2013, 2015, 2016, 2017, and 2018.)
- Greens: Bentgrass
- Fairways: Bentgrass / Poa annua
- Website: glenabbey.clublink.ca
- Designer: Jack Nicklaus
- Par: 73
- Length: 7,273 yards (6,650 m)
- Course rating: 74.7
- Slope rating: 132
- Course record: 62 - Greg Norman (1986), John Merrick (2013)
- Glen Abbey logo

Glen Abbey Golf Club is a public golf course in Oakville, Ontario, Canada. It is one of Canada's most famous golf courses and is home to Golf Canada and the Canadian Golf Hall of Fame. It has hosted 30 Canadian Open Championships, more than any other course, with the first having been in 1977. It was the first solo design by Jack Nicklaus in 1976.

A distinguishing feature of the Glen Abbey course are the "Valley Holes", numbered 11 through 15. On number 11, a par 4, players tee off a cliff to a fairway that is approximately 60 feet below on the valley floor. The second shot must clear Sixteen Mile Creek to the green. Holes 12, 13 and 14 all use Sixteen Mile Creek as a hazard of one form or another. Number 15 is a short par 3 with a sharply sloping green, after which players climb out of the valley to the 16th hole.

Glen Abbey is owned by Clublink, operated by TWC Enterprises Limited. The company was planning to demolish the golf course in order to build residential and commercial units. The plan was opposed by the Oakville Town Council, which designated the facility a heritage site. In 2018, the company achieved some success in its efforts against the town after a Superior Court ruled against the town's attempts to block its plan. From 2017 to 2021, a local citizen’s coalition, “Save Glen Abbey”, pressured local, regional and provincial politicians to stop the development and preserve the site as a golf course. As a result, in July 2021, the Ontario government became involved in the issue and an agreement was reached for the Glen Abbey Golf Course redevelopment plans to be quashed and the golf course to continue. The Glen Abbey Golf Course is now continuing to operate going forward, recognized as a sports venue of historic importance.

== History ==
The property Glen Abbey is situated on was previously owned by a number of groups before it was made into a golf club. The land was originally patented to King's College (the predecessor to the University of Toronto) in 1814. In 1937, the property was sold to Andre Dorfman, as a private estate. In 1953, the property was sold to the Jesuit Fathers of Upper Canada, and was used as a retreat. From 1963 to 1974, the property was sold to another developer, who first attempted to develop the property into a gentlemen's club and golf course; and later into a ski hill.

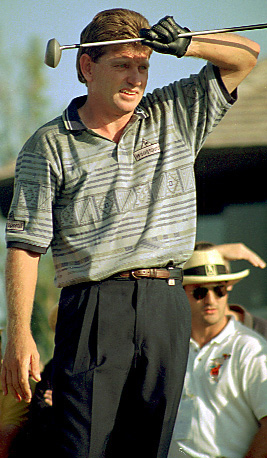
Nick Price at the 1994 Canadian Open at Glen Abbey Golf Club.

In 1974, the property was sold to another developer, who developed the property into the present golf course. In 1975, the Royal Canadian Golf Association relocated its headquarters and the Canadian Golf Hall of Fame to the golf club the following year. Two years later, the course hosted its first Canadian Open. The golf club is presently a rota course of the Canadian Open, hosting the event 30 times since 1977. The Royal Canadian Golf Association purchased the club in 1990 and sold it to Clublink in 1999.

The 18th hole is notable due to its connection to Tiger Woods, who, in the final round of the 2000 Canadian Open, hit a six-iron shot 218 yards from a bunker on the right side of the fairway to about 18 feet from the hole. The shot was over a large pond that guards the green. In doing so, Woods proceeded to defeat his playing partner Grant Waite and won the tournament. The shot is regarded as one of the most spectacular both of Woods' career and in recent PGA Tour history.

In 2009, Mark Calcavecchia set a new PGA Tour record with 9 consecutive birdies in his second round of the Canadian Open. After having started the round on the 10th hole, he birdied holes 12 through 18, then holes 1 and 2 of the front nine.

=== Redevelopment plan ===
Clublink Corp first filed an application in October 2015 to redevelop the property. In its plan, there was no provision for a golf course. The Town of Oakville Council responded in August 2017 by declaring the golf course a heritage site under the Ontario Heritage Act. This would make it more difficult for Clublink to develop the area as it had planned, with 3,222 housing units. 69,000 square feet of commercial/retail space and 107,000 square feet of office space. Golf Canada was also concerned, since they could not predict whether it could get the necessary permit to hold the Canadian Open at Glen Abbey in 2018. Eventually, the event was in fact held at Glen Abbey.

The Town of Oakville formally rejected the plan to demolish the golf course in a unanimous vote by the Planning and Development Council on February 12, 2018. In summer 2018, Clublink was awaiting a Superior Court decision on its plan to request a demolition permit and, in the meantime, the Canadian Open took place at the course. On October 25, 2018, Justice Edward Morgan ruled that Clublink had a right to take its demolition application to the Local Planning Appeal Tribunal (LPAT), in spite of the town's previous denial of this step. The city council subsequently voted unanimously to take the issue to the Ontario Court of Appeal.

On December 11, 2018, the Ontario Superior Court ruled against the conservation plan and bylaws which had been enacted to stop the Glen Abbey development plan. Judge Edward Morgan said that the effort exceeded the town's legal rights and was made in bad faith. The Local Planning Appeal Tribunal (LPAT) will hold an eight-day hearing in June 2019 on ClubLink’s appeal of the town’s updated official plan and amended bylaws and later in 2019, another hearing later about ClubLink’s development application appeal.

A report at the time of the October 2018 hearing clarified the owner's plan: building "3,222 residential units, including nine apartment buildings between nine and 12 storeys in height". These would be over and above the planned office space and commercial/retail space.

The 2019 and 2023 Canadian Open were scheduled to be held at the Hamilton Golf and Country Club but the event may again be held at Glen Abbey in some future years if the redevelopment is not allowed to proceed.

In July 2021, following discussions with the Ontario government, the Glen Abbey Golf Course redevelopment plans were quashed by Clublink and the property continued as a golf course. With the redevelopment plans no longer proposed, the Glen Abbey Golf Course continues to operate going forward, recognized as a sports property of historic importance.

== Scorecard ==
Glen Abbey Golf Club
Tee	Rating/Slope	1	2	3	4	5	6	7	8	9	Out	10	11	12	13	14	15	16	17	18	In	Total
Black	74.7 / 132	502	414	156	417	527	437	197	433	458	3541	443	452	205	558	457	141	516	436	524	3732	7273
Gold	72.2 / 127	483	393	123	379	504	406	142	391	408	3229	375	439	187	529	367	122	494	396	484	3393	6622
Blue	70.6 / 123	460	380	123	345	452	395	135	391	383	3064	369	435	152	481	330	115	452	365	461	3160	6224
SI	Men's	15	1	13	9	17	5	11	7	3		10	2	8	12	4	18	14	6	16
Par		5	4	3	4	5	4	3	4	4	36	4	4	3	5	4	3	5	4	5	37	73
Green	73.6 / 132	460	288	123	345	452	347	135	358	354	2852	369	362	152	415	325	115	353	365	429	2885	5747
Red	70.4 / 125	389	288	95	271	411	347	94	358	354	2607	329	362	118	415	325	104	353	304	429	2739	5346
SI	Ladies'	5	9	13	7	15	3	11	17	1		14	4	10	6	18	16	12	8	2

== See also ==
- List of Jesuit sites
