= Weston Golf and Country Club =

Golf and country club in Toronto, Ontario, Canada

Coordinates: 43.704°N 79.540°W

- Interactive map of Weston Golf and Country Club

Club information
- Location: 50 St. Phillips Road, Toronto, Ontario, Canada
- Established: 1915
- Type: Private
- Tota holes: 18
- Website: westongolfcc.com
- Designed by: Willie Park, Jr.
- Par: 72
- Length: 6,807 Yards
- Course rating: 73.2

Weston Golf and Country Club is located in Toronto, Ontario. Designed by Willie Park, Jr., it was home to Arnold Palmer's first PGA Tour victory in the 1955 Canadian Open.

== Golf ==
In 2018, Weston's golf course was ranked 31st in Canada by ScoreGolf. Weston G&CC hosts an annual elite amateur men's Willie Park Jr. Memorial tournament, held in late summertime. It was started in 1925.

Club member Warren Sye is one of Canada's most accomplished golfers. He won the Canadian Amateur in 1990 and 1994, and captured five Ontario Amateur titles. He was also runner-up at the 1998 U.S. Mid-Amateur. Sye was made a Life Member of the club for his accomplishments and was inducted into the Canadian Golf Hall of Fame in 2016.

== Curling ==
Since November 1956, the club's curling rink had provided winter recreation to members and their associates. To celebrate the 100th anniversary of the club, the 2015 Canadian Amateur Golf event and the 2016 Canadian Mixed Curling event were held at Weston.

As of 2018, Weston Golf and Country Club closed its curling club.
