= Percy Barrett (golfer) =

Canadian professional golfer

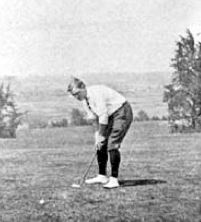
- Barrett, c. 1905

Personal information
- Full name: Percy Frederick Barrett
- Nationality: England; Canada
- Born: 1 January 1881 Matlock, Derbyshire, England
- Died: 20 January 1927 (aged 46) Toronto, Ontario, Canada
- Spouse: May Owen
- Children: 3

Career
- Sport: Golf
- Status: Professional
- Professional wins: 3

Best results in major championships
- PGA Championship: DNP
- U.S. Open: T3: 1905
- The Open Championship: DNP

Percy Frederick Barrett (1 January 1881 – 20 January 1927) was a Canadian professional golfer of English birth who played in the early 20th century. His best finish in a major tournament, a tie for third place, came in the 1905 U.S. Open at Myopia Hunt Club in South Hamilton, Massachusetts. Barrett won the 1907 Canadian Open as well as the 1923 and 1925 Canadian PGA Championship.

== Early life ==
Barrett was born in Matlock, Derbyshire, England, on 1 January 1881 to William Barrett (1860–1938) and his then girlfriend (but later wife) Emma Barrett née Kiddy (1857–1927). At the time of his birth, Percy's mother was unmarried and living with her parents, therefore his birth name was Percy Frederick Kiddy.

In 1903 Barrett emigrated from England to Toronto, Ontario, Canada, and that same year was appointed as the head golf professional at Lambton Golf and Country Club in Toronto. Barrett, who was 23 years old at the time, had tutelage in England under the legendary Harry Vardon. Under Vardon's watchful eye he apprenticed as a club maker. On 18 September 1907 he married May Owen (1883–1954) in Toronto and the couple had three children.

== Professional career ==
In 1907 Barrett won the Canadian Open which was held at Lambton Golf and Country Club where he remained in the head professional post until 1914. Barrett twice won the Canadian PGA Championship, in 1923 and again in 1925. Barrett was known for using a very short putter that was no more than 20-22 inches long.

== Death ==
Upon his death on 20 January 1927, Barrett's finances were in disarray and he left his family "without provision for their future" according to an article published in the Montreal Gazette on 25 January 1927. He was survived by his wife and three children. An appeal for funds was sent out to collect donations for his estate.

== Tournament wins (3) ==
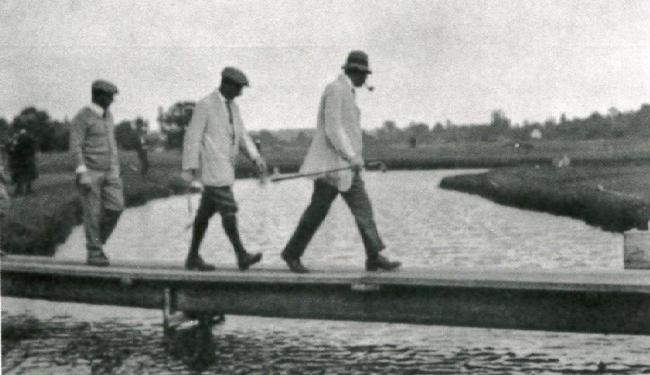
George Cumming (far left), Harry Vardon (middle), and Ted Ray (front) walking across a bridge at Lambton Golf and Country Club, Toronto, Ontario, in a 1913 exhibition golf match. Barrett (not pictured) partnered with Cumming.

Note: This list may be incomplete.

- 1907 Canadian Open
- 1923 Canadian PGA Championship
- 1925 Canadian PGA Championship

== Results in major championships ==
Tournament	1904	1905	1906	1907	1908	1909	1910	1911	1912
U.S. Open	T6	T3	T33	?	T8	?	?	?	T13

Note: Barrett played only in the U.S. Open.

"T" indicates a tie for a place
? = unknown
Yellow background for top-10
