= Shaughnessy Golf & Country Club =

Golf club in Vancouver, Canada

Coordinates: 49.224°N 123.185°W

- Interactive map of Shaughnessy Golf & Country Club

Club information
- Established: 1911
- Type: Private

Shaughnessy Golf & Country Club is a private golf club in Canada, located on Southwest Marine Drive in Vancouver, British Columbia. In 1984 the Shaughnessy Golf & Country Club was also the subject of a dispute, Guerin v. The Queen between the Crown and the Musqueam Nation; the case ended up in the Supreme Court of Canada and established the government had a fiduciary duty to the First Nations of Canada.

== History ==
The Shaughnessy Heights Golf Course, today the Shaughnessy Golf and Country Club, had its beginning in 1911 in the office of CPR executive Richard Marpole. Nine businessmen, all residents of the prestigious and quickly developing enclave of Shaughnessy, to turn 67 acres (27 ha) of land leased from the CPR into the Shaughnessy Heights Golf Course. The first nine holes opened on November 2, 1912; the second nine, the next year. The course was designed by A.V. Macan, an Irish immigrant from Wexford, who was one of the region's best golfers.

In the decades to follow, many of the names who played a prominent role in Vancouver's growth and prosperity also appeared on Shaughnessy's membership roster.

The club moved to new premises in the late 1950s, responding to the growth of the Vancouver urban region, and sold its original property. Macan, then in his late 70s, also designed the new course, which opened in the early 1960s. The land the club currently resides upon belongs to the Musqueam Nation but was leased to Shaughnessy through a series of meetings with federal agents that did not include the Nation. The land will not be returned to the Musqueam until 2033.

In 2011 the club hosted the Canadian Open for the fourth time, which coincides with Shaughnessy's 100th anniversary. It follows the 2011 British Open, which was held at Royal St George's Golf Club.

In 2023, the club hosted the Canadian Women's Open for the first time.

== Tournaments hosted ==
- British Columbia Open in 1928, 1938, 1948, 1952, 1955, 1962 and 1969
- 1936 Vancouver Jubilee Open, won by Ken Black
- 1948 Canadian Open, won by Charles Congdon
- 1966 Canadian Open, won by Don Massengale
- 1969 Molson's Canadian Open, won by Carol Mann
- 2005 Bell Canadian Open, won by Mark Calcavecchia
- 2011 RBC Canadian Open, won by Sean O'Hair
- 2023 CPKC Women's Open, Megan Khang

== See also ==
- List of golf courses in British Columbia
- R v Guerin
