= Hamilton Golf and Country Club =

Golf course in Ancaster, Ontario, Canada

Coordinates: 43.217°N 79.975°W

Hamilton Golf and Country Club is located in Ancaster, Ontario.

The club began in October 1894. Renowned English golf architect Harry Colt designed 18 of the current 27 holes (making up the current West and South courses) in 1914, with Canadian golf architect Robbie Robinson adding a third nine (the East Nine) in 1974. The current Chedoke Golf Club, now a municipal course, was the second location of the Hamilton Golf and Country Club, with the original being on the corner of Barton and Ottawa streets. The course has a short course and a driving range.

The club has hosted seven Canadian Opens, most recently in June 2024. The course was lengthened and renovated in the late 1990s, in preparation for the recent Opens. In 2019 the club began a $11-million restoration to all 27 holes, directed by golf architect Martin Ebert, with 18 holes re-opening in 2021, and the final 9 holes on East re-opened in the summer of 2022.

Hamilton Golf and Country Club has been long regarded as one of the top golf courses in Canada, currently ranking seventh on Canada's list of best golf courses by ScoreGolf magazine and recently number 39 in Golf Digest's Top 100 Courses in the World (excludes United States).

The course record is held by Brandt Snedeker, who shot a 10 under par 60 shot round June 7, 2019, while competing in the second round of the 2019 Canadian Open.

== Major tournaments hosted ==
- Canadian Open 1919, won by J. Douglas Edgar
- Canadian Open 1930, won by Tommy Armour
- Canadian Open 2003, won by Bob Tway
- Canadian Open 2006, won by Jim Furyk
- Canadian Open 2012, won by Scott Piercy
- Canadian Open 2019, won by Rory McIlroy
- Canadian Open 2024, won by Robert MacIntyre
