= Scarboro Golf and Country Club =

Golf club in Toronto, Ontario, Canada

- Location in Toronto
- 43.7537°N 79.2118°W

Club information
- Location: 321 Scarborough Golf Club Road; Toronto, Ontario, Canada; M1J 3H2
- Established: 1912
- Type: private
- Total holes: 18
- Website: scarborogolf.com
- Designer: A. W. Tillinghast
- Par: 71
- Length: 6,547 yards

The Scarboro Golf and Country Club is a private club in eastern Toronto, Ontario, Canada, located in the former city of Scarborough. Until 2018, it had facilities for curling and has an 18-hole golf course that is ranked among the top courses in Canada.

The club was founded in 1912 by stockbroker A.E. Ames. Its 144-acre (58 ha) site is located in the Woburn neighbourhood, approximately 12 miles (19 km) from downtown Toronto. The course was originally designed by George Cumming and was extensively changed in 1924 under the direction of one of the America's celebrated designers, A. W. Tillinghast (who designed noted U.S. Open courses - Baltusrol Golf Club, Bethpage Black and Winged Foot amongst others), his only work in Canada and in his only work outside of the United States. In 1947, legendary golf course designer Stanley Thompson was commissioned to reduce the severity of some of the slopes on the course including major work on a hill on the eighth hole. The course plays to par 71, and it plays to 6,547 yards from the championship tees through the West Highland Creek valley. The creek comes into play as many as 11 times in 18 holes, and the hilly terrain, gullies and trees as natural hazards, making artificial hazards almost unnecessary at Scarboro.

The club has been host of the Canadian Open golf tournament four times, as follows:

- 1940 won by Sam Snead
- 1947 won by Bobby Locke
- 1953 won by Dave Douglas
- 1963 won by Doug Ford in a playoff with Al Geiberger

Numerous other professional and amateur events have been conducted on the club's fairways, most recently hosting the 1987 and 2012 CPGA Tour Championship. Scarboro hosted the 1954 Labatt Open won by Bud Holscher who shot a course record score of 63 in the final round. In hosting the 1958 Canadian Amateur Championship, a first round casualty was an 18-year-old Jack Nicklaus. In 1961, the course was one of 25 that hosted the World Series of Golf matches between Masters and British Open champions, Arnold Palmer and Gary Player. In 2022, the club was host of the 100th Ontario Amateur Championship.

The course gives its name — with a change in spelling to Scarborough — to the north-south concession road astride which it lies, Scarborough Golf Club Road.

The widening and construction of a bridge under the adjacent GO Transit Lakeshore East line local rail corridor was cited as the reason for the closing of the curling facility in 2018, a decision taken by club's board of directors, and supported by a majority of club shareholders, though closing the curling facility was not absolutely necessary for the widening. The decision caused some controversy as some curling club members wanted the facility to remain.
