= Royal Quebec Golf Club =

Golf club near Quebec City

Coordinates: 46.903°N 71.149°W

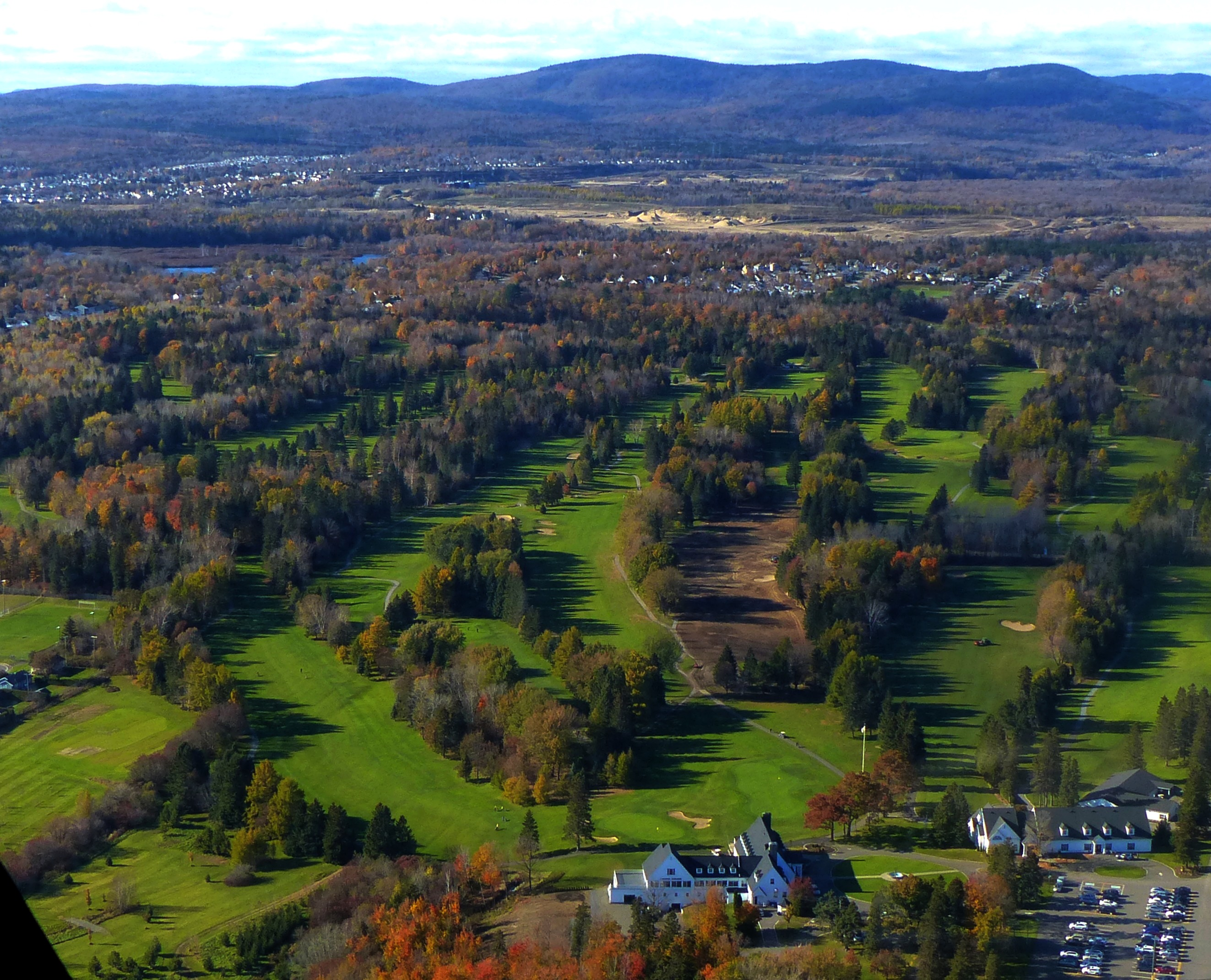
View of the club in October 2015

The Royal Quebec Golf Club (French: Club de Golf Royal Québec) is a golf club founded in 1874 in Boischatel by members of the local business community, mainly Scots-Quebecer bankers and businessmen.

Located approximately 12 miles (18 km) east of Quebec City, near Montmorency Falls, it has been a semi-private club since 1925. One of the oldest golf clubs in North America, the current 36-hole facility is situated on a 186-hectare piece of land with pine trees. The clubhouse, by the 18th green of the "Quebec" course, overlooks l'Île d'Orléans and Quebec City.

== Notable members ==
- Tommy Bolt
- Billy Casper
- Jimmy Demaret
- Dow Finsterwald
- Lionel Fleury
- Doug Ford
- Stan Leonard
- Gene Littler
- Jonathan Marchessault
- Arnold Palmer
- Patrick Roy
- Sam Snead
- Frank Stranahan
- Lee Trevino
- Art Wall Jr.

== See also ==
- List of Canadian organizations with royal patronage
- List of golf clubs granted Royal status
- List of golf courses in Quebec
