= Toronto Golf Club =

Private golf club in Mississauga, Ontario

The Toronto Golf Club

- Location within Toronto
- 43.593°N 79.554°W

Club information
- Location: 1305 Dixie Road; Mississauga, Ontario, Canada
- Established: 1876; 150 years ago
- Type: Private
- Total holes: 18
- Tournaments: Canadian Open (1905, 1909, 1914, 1921 and 1927); Canadian Amateur Championship (1898, 1901, 1903, 1905, 1909, 1913, 1926, 1995, 2017)
- Website: torontogolfclub.com
- Designed by: Harry Colt
- Par: 70
- Length: 6,251 metres (6,836 yd)
- Course rating: 73.7
- Slope rating: 141

The Toronto Golf Club is a private golf club in Mississauga, Ontario, a suburban municipality to the west of Toronto. Established in Toronto in 1876, it is the third-oldest golf club in North America, after the Royal Montreal Golf Club and the Royal Quebec Golf Club. The Toronto Golf Club adopted its current name in 1909 and moved to its present location in 1913. The club has hosted the Canadian Open five times and the Canadian Amateur Championship nine times, more than any other club.

== History ==
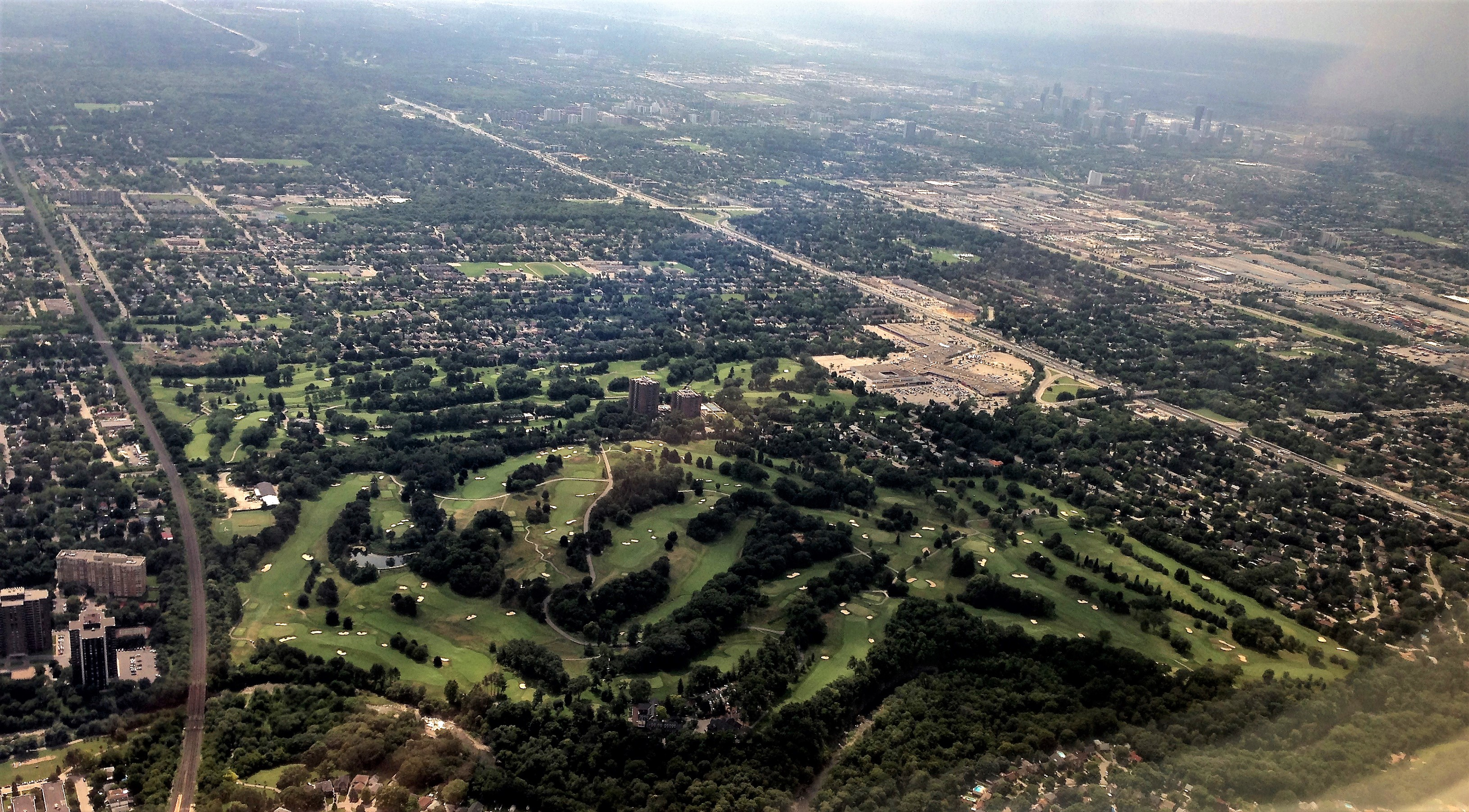
Aerial view of the Toronto Golf Club and its courses in Mississauga

It originated on a parcel of land known as the Fernhill property, which was included within the city of Toronto in the 1900s. The original course was located east of Coxwell Avenue between the railway and slightly south of what is now Eastwood Road and then along a narrow area between tracks and north side of Upper Gerrard Street east to what is now Kildonan Road. In 1909, the Club obtained a new charter without share capital, and the original name of the club, "The Toronto Golf Club", was restored. The following year, it was decided to acquire a new site in Toronto Township, now Mississauga. The old course is now part of the Upper Beaches residential area.

The club is now located on the banks of the Etobicoke River, and its 18-hole course was designed by the renowned English architect Harry Colt. The course was ready for play in the fall of 1912, and its clubhouse was completed in 1913. In 1919, the Club bought additional land to the north and had a new nine-hole course built which opened in 1921. George Cumming was hired in 1900, at age 21, to serve as head professional and remained in that position for 50 years. Donovan Fraser is the current Head Professional. Hired in 2024, Fraser took over from Doug Rankin, who was the Professional from 1991 to 2023. John Hunt, Professional 1959–90; Lou Cumming, Professional 1950–59; George Cumming, Professional 1900–50; Arthur Smith, Professional 1895–99.

== Tournaments hosted ==
The Toronto Golf Club has hosted several major events in its history. The golf club was a former rota course of the Canadian Open, hosting the event on five occasions. It hosted the event twice at its original location in Toronto (1905 and 1909), and hosted the event three more times at its current location in 1914, 1921 and 1927. The Toronto Golf Club has also hosted the Canadian Amateur Championship nine times, more than any other club. The golf club played host to the tournament in 1898, 1901, 1903, 1905, 1909, 1913, 1926, 1995, and 2017.
