= Bertie Austin =

Canadian golfer (1888–1913)

Albert Edison Austin (November 1, 1888 – February 5, 1913) was a Canadian Olympic athlete. He was the second son of Albert W. Austin, a prominent businessman and founder of the Lambton Golf and Country Club.

He grew up in Winnipeg, where his father ran the streetcar system. The family later moved to Toronto, and Bertie spent the latter part of his youth living at Spadina House, which today is a museum.

Bertie, his father, and Lambton club champion George Lyon traveled to St. Louis for the 1904 Olympics. The Olympics in that era were more casual, and to participate, one merely needed to show up and pay the entry fee. Bertie finished 65th of 75 competitors, but Lyon went on to win the gold medal.

Bertie died of tuberculosis at the age of 24 in Cairo, Egypt.
