= Lambton Golf and Country Club =

Golf and tennis club in Toronto, Canada

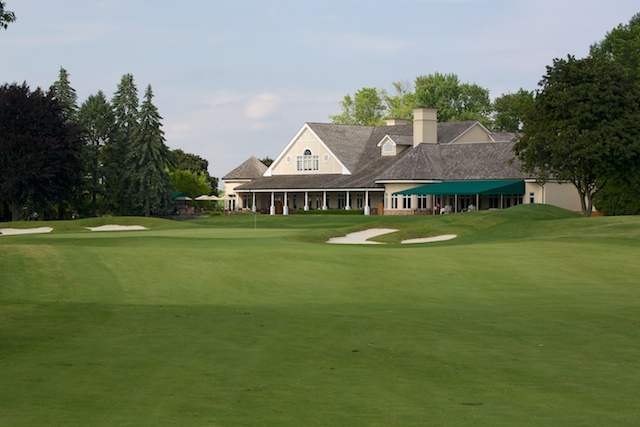
- The clubhouse in May 2014

- Location within Toronto
- 43.670°N 79.508°W

Club information
- Location: 100 Scarlett Road; Toronto, Ontario; M6N 4K2
- Established: 1902
- Type: Private
- Tournaments: Canadian Open (1907, 1911, 1925, 1941); Canadian Amateur Championship (1907, 1910, 1919, 1932); Canadian Women's Amateur (1908)
- Website: Lambton Golf and Country Club
- Par: 72
- Length: 6,493 metres (7,101 yd)
- Course rating: 73.8
- Slope rating: 142

The Lambton Golf and Country Club is a private golf and tennis club in Toronto, Ontario, Canada. The golf club was established by Albert William Austin in 1902. The golf club is presently members with Golf Canada, and the United States Golf Association., and has hosted a number of competitions including the Canadian Open, and the Canadian Amateur Championship.

== History ==
Albert William Austin, by John Wycliffe Lowes Forster. Austin established the golf club in 1902.

The seeds of the golf club were planted by Toronto Businessman James Austin. He rebuilt Spadina House (which is now a museum) in 1866 to house his family. He died after several months of illness at the age of eighty-four in 1897. At his death he had a fortune of some $300,000 which was divided between his son and daughter. His business interests and his home passed on to his son Albert William Austin.

Albert Austin had laid out a few holes of golf in vacant farmlands in the area where Casa Loma now stands. This was strictly for the pleasure of his family and a few friends but grew into the Spadina Golf Club, which had a layout through farmers' fields north over St. Clair Avenue, through Forest Hill Village to just south of Eglinton. The clubhouse was a rented farmhouse at the northeast corner of St. Clair and Spadina Road. In early 1902, the Spadina members recognized that the farmers were likely to sell for development the land on which the nine-hole course lay.

As plans for the new course took shape, the estimated cost of $30,000 to develop the property at Lambton Mills, on which an option had been obtained, caused Austin to solicit support from a wider group of golfing enthusiasts, including members of Rosedale, High Park and Highlands Golf Clubs as well as Spadina.

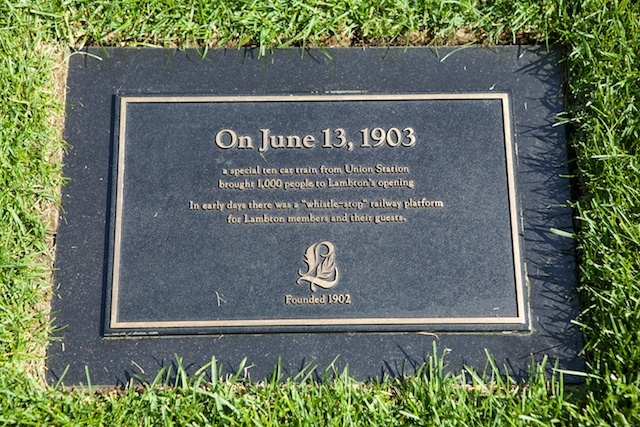
A plaque commemorating the opening of the golf club in June 1903.

The response to the solicitation was such that a committee, chaired by Austin and including George S. Lyon, proceeded with the project, and the official opening took place in driving rain on 13 June 1903. Membership was close to 400, and it was estimated 1,000 persons attended the opening ceremonies. Most of the original members traveled to play the course by train, disembarking at a small station near the club. A plaque now on the 18th tee commemorates this mode of transportation, as well as the opening of the club.

Lambton had some noteworthy features for that day and age. The nine-hole Valley Course for Ladies was an innovation. The club had a telephone. An ice house was built adjoining the clubhouse, which, before opening day, already contained 100 tons of Lake Simcoe ice.

Lambton's traditions owe much to the founding members, including the club's official red jacket, which is a modified form of that worn by Austin in his portrait, which hangs in the clubhouse. Another tradition, the singing of "My Wild Irish Rose" at certain club dinners is a continuation of the practice introduced by George S. Lyon.

Lambton Golf and Country Club's original clubhouse, c. 1903

The original clubhouse was constructed over the winter of 1902-03 and was ready for the club’s official opening on June 13, 1903. Today, Lambton Golf and Country Club occupies 171 acres of rolling terrain defined by the Humber River and Black Creek.

Over the years, Lambton has hosted numerous provincial and national championships, including four Canadian Opens, four Canadian Amateurs, the Canadian Ladies’ Amateur Championship, the Canadian PGA Championship, the second Canadian Seniors Golf Association Championship in 1919, the Canadian Women’s Senior Golf Association Championship and others.

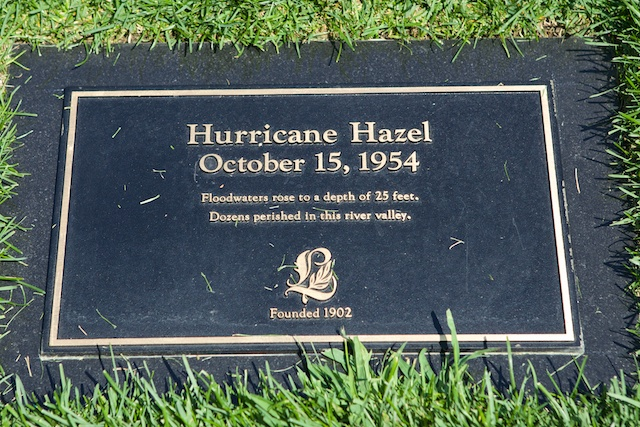
A plaque commemorating those who died from Hurricane Hazel.

The golf course experienced flooding in October 1954, after Hurricane Hazel passed through the area. The course was restored in early 1960s, and a new clubhouse was built, including facilities for curling.

Lambton has awarded two honorary lifetime memberships. The first was awarded to Marlene Stewart Streit in 1953 after her victory at the British Amateur Championship at Royal Porthcawl in South Wales. Marlene went on to win the Australian, Canadian and U.S. Amateur Championships, the only female amateur to win all four. She was later inducted into the World Golf Hall of Fame in 2004 and the Canadian Golf Hall of Fame in 1971. The second recipient was Gary Cowan of Kitchener, a two-time U.S. Amateur Champion. Gary was inducted into the Canadian Golf Hall of Fame in 1972.

=== 21st century ===
The Club also hosted The Four Nations Team Championship as Canada defeated squads from Australia, New Zealand and Japan in 2001. Alena Sharp won the 2004 Canadian PGA Women’s Championship. In the same year, the golf club completed a brand new clubhouse, in time for the club's 100th anniversary.

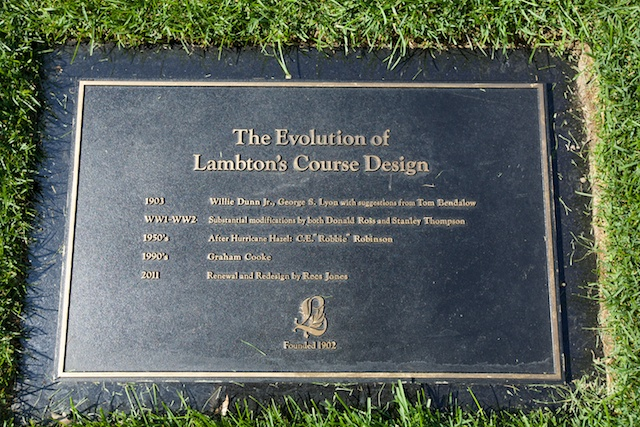
A plaque outlining the development of the golf course.

Over the last Century, a number of noted golf course architects contributed some of their genius to the old course design including: A. W. Tillinghast, Harry Colt, Donald Ross, Stanley Thompson, Robbie Robinson, Graham Cooke, and Rees Jones in 2010. In 2014, the redesigned Lambton hosted the Toronto Star Amateur featuring the top amateurs in Ontario. Ryan Tsang of Cedar Brae G&CC was the overall champion shooting 71-66-73-68 to win the tournament by 7 shots.

In 2015, Lambton co-hosted the Golf Canada Men's Golf Championship qualifying rounds. Four record 66's were shot on the 7,008 yard Championship Par 71 course. In the same year, on September 24, Lambton celebrated George Lyon's 111th Anniversary of his Olympic gold medal victory.

Lambton hosted the Ontario Men's Mid-Amateur Championship in June 2016. As of 2016, the Championship Course had five tee decks per hole and yardage ranging from 5300 to 7100 yards.

== Tournaments hosted ==
Lambton Golf and Country Club has hosted several major events in its history, including the Canadian Opens, and the Canadian Amateurs. The golf club has hosted both tournaments on four occasions. The golf club was a former rota course of the Canadian Open, hosting the tournament in 1907, 1910, 1925, and 1941. Winners of the Canadian Open in Lambton Golf and Country Club include:

- 1907: Percy Barrett
- 1910: Daniel Kenny
- 1925: Leo Diegel
- 1941: Sam Snead

== Noted golfers ==
Lambton’s first golf captain, George Lyon, oversaw the completion of the championship 18-hole course with assistance from American golf course architect Tom Bendelow. The nine-hole Valley course, completed in 1904, may well have been the first course designed for lady golfers. It is also noteworthy that tennis has been played at the Club almost continuously since 1904. Lyon, who was born in 1858, remained Lambton’s captain for 23 years. He was an eight-time Canadian Amateur Champion (1898, 1900, 1903, 1905-06-07, 1912 and 1914), won the golf Gold Medal at the 1904 Olympics at The Glen Echo Country Club in St. Louis at the age of 46. He was also runner-up at the 1910 Canadian Open held at Lambton. He was inducted into the Canada's Sports Hall of Fame in 1955 and Canadian Golf Hall of Fame in 1971.

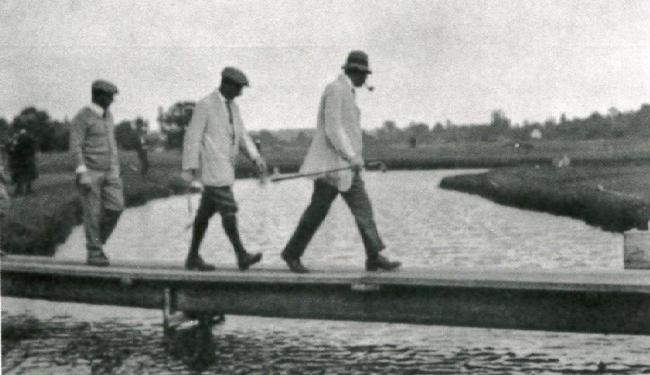
George Cumming, Harry Vardon, and Ted Ray crossing bridge at Lambton Golf and Country Club, 1913.

In 1913, Harry Vardon and Ted Ray put on an exhibition at Lambton on their way back to England from the U.S. Open Championship. After 72 holes of open play finished in a three-way tie, Ouimet, Vardon, and Ray went on to an 18-hole playoff the next day in rainy conditions, won by Ouimet. His victory was widely hailed as a stunning upset over the strongly-favored British, who were regarded as the top two golfers in the world. Francis Ouimet was immortalized the 2005 film The Greatest Game Ever Played.

The 100th Anniversary of the Vardon, Ray, Cumming and Barrett match was re-enacted at Lambton on September 28, 2013 by the Lambton membership and the Golf Historical Society of Canada.

In 1903, Lambton appointed its first Head Professional, who came from Great Britain. Percy Barrett, 23 years old at the time, had tutelage under Harry Vardon. In 1907, he won the Canadian Open which was held at Lambton where he remained the Head Professional until 1914. In 1914 Willie Freeman, the assistant from the Toronto Golf Club was appointed. He left in 1923 when Andy Kay took the post. Kay finished tied for third in the 1925 Canadian Open held at Lambton.

In 1919, the Prince of Wales played Lambton. He later became King Edward VIII.

In 1934, Willie Lamb became the new Head Professional, a position he retained for the next 30 years, retiring in 1964. Lamb won may Canadian Championships including five CPGA Championships. Ted Devenish became Lambton's fourth Head Professional and held the position for 12 years. In 1977, Alan Ogilvie and his team (Dudley Jones, Charles Lorimer) came from Summerlea Golf Club in Montreal. Although he remained for only three years (moved on to be Director of Golf at Glen Abbey Golf Club in Oakville) his head assistant, Dudley Jones became the Head Professional holding the position for 23 years.

In 2003, Matthew Yustin and his team (Chris Vasey and Steve Manock) moved in and is the current Head Professional.
