= John Wycliffe Lowes Forster =

Canadian artist

J. W. L. Forster
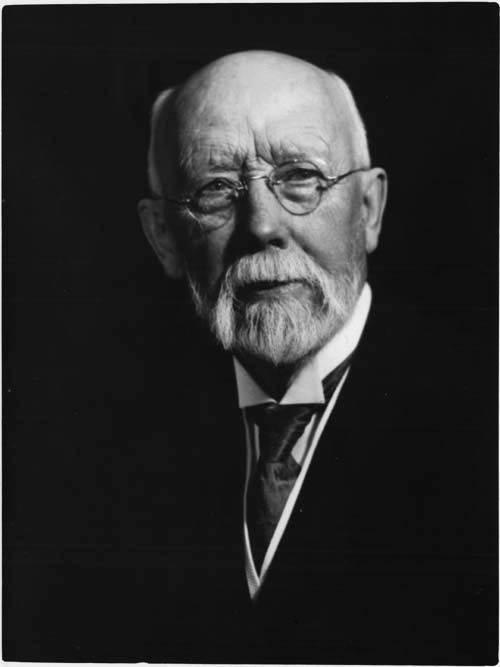
- John Wycliffe Lowes Forster
- Born: December 31, 1850; Norval, Canada West
- Died: April 24, 1934 (aged 83); Toronto, Ontario, Canada
- Education: studied in Toronto with J. W. Bridgman; Académie Julian, Paris, with Jules Joseph Lefebvre and Gustave Boulanger (1880-1882); Tony Robert-Fleury and William-Adolphe Bouguereau; and later with Carolus Duran
- Known for: portrait and landscape painter
- Notable work: portrait of James Whiteside, Toronto

J. W. L. Forster or, more formally, John Wycliffe Lowes Forster RCA (31 December 1850 – 24 April 1938) was a Canadian artist specializing in portraits. Many of his works can be found at the National Gallery of Canada.

== Career ==
In Toronto in 1869, he started his art education as a student of portrait painter John Wesley Bridgman (1833–1902). For his portrait of Bridgman, he won first place in the amateur division at the Upper Canada Agricultural Society's annual fair in 1871. In 1879 Forster studied for three months at the South Kensington Art School in London with Canadian landscape painter Charles Stuart Millard (1837-1917). After that, he attended the Académie Julian in Paris, studying with Jules Joseph Lefebvre and Gustave Boulanger (1880-1882); Tony Robert-Fleury and William-Adolphe Bouguereau; and later, with Carolus Duran.

He returned to Toronto in 1883 and was elected a member of the Royal Canadian Academy of Arts. Among his writings are 2 volumes of autobiography and a survey of early Ontario artists.

== Gallery ==
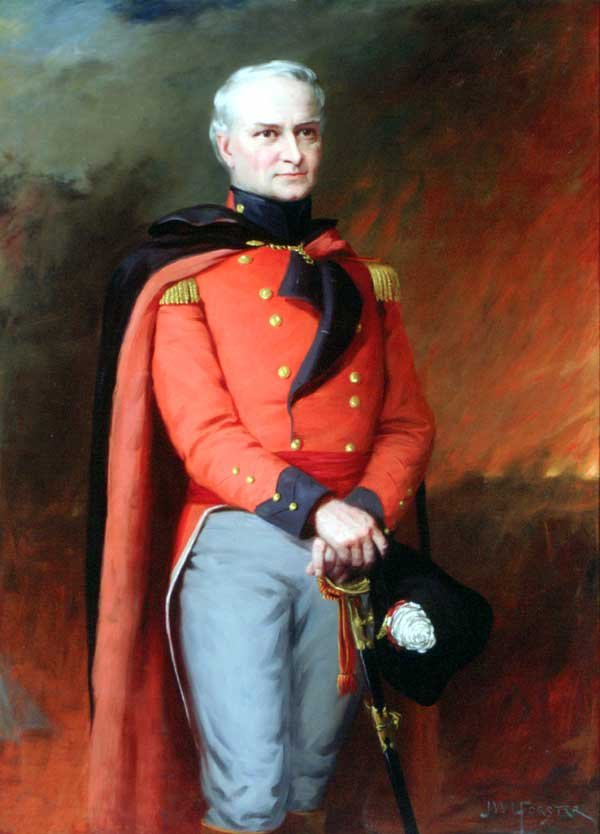
Aeneas Shaw by John Wycliffe Lowes Forster

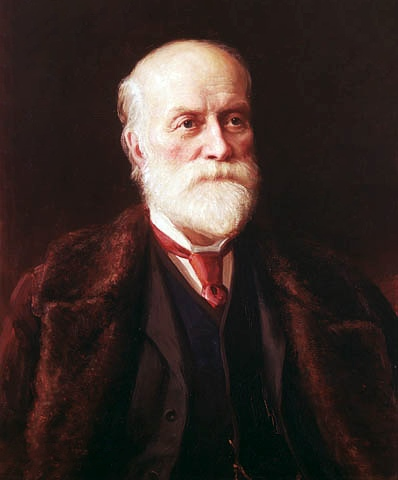
Sir Sandford Fleming (1892) by John Wycliffe Lowes Forster

Albert William Austin (1857–1931), Canadian golfer, director of the Dominion Bank, son of James Austin

== Works ==
Title/subject	Date created
William P. Caven	circa 1883
Sir Sandford Fleming	1892
John Beverley Robinson	1895
Alexander Mackenzie	1897
John Sparrow David Thompson	1897
Susanna Annesley	circa 1900
John Wesley	circa 1900
Charles Wesley	circa 1900
Aeneas Shaw	circa 1902
Robert Franklin Sutherland	circa 1906
Sir John A. Macdonald	
Robert Baldwin	
William Lyon Mackenzie	
John Graves Simcoe	
Sir Isaac Brock	
James Wolfe	
Christopher Finlay Fraser	
Albert William Austin	
George McDougall	
James Henderson	
Alfred Gandier	
George Cochran	
William Gooderham Jr.	
Samuel S. Nelles	
Nathanael Burwash	
Margaret (Hopkins) Cox	
Alexander Sutherland	
John Potts	
George A. Cox	
W.E.H. Massey	
Hart A. Massey	
Egerton Ryerson	
