= Barochan Cross =

Scottish celtic cross

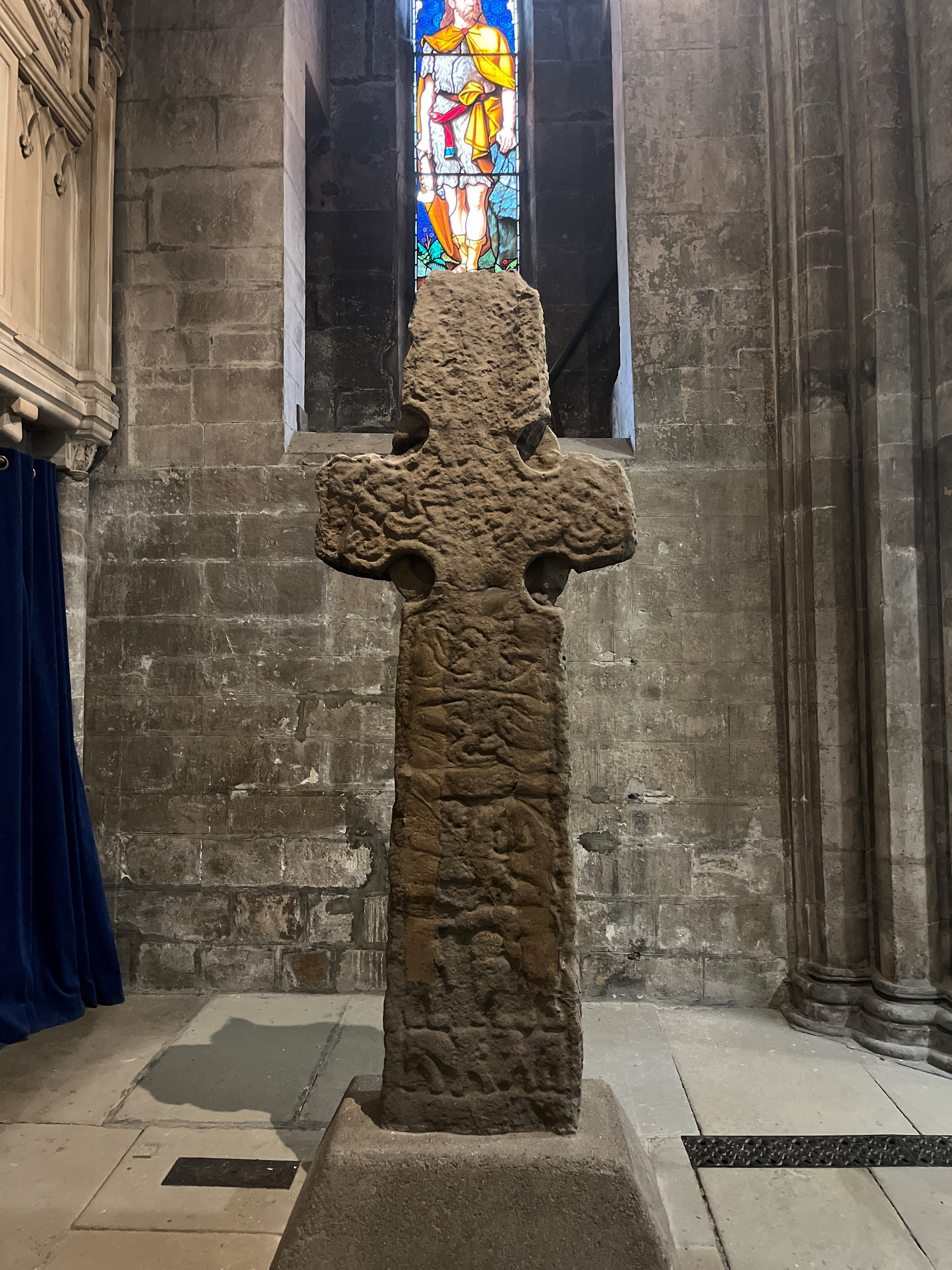
Barochan Cross in Paisley Abbey

Barochan Cross positions
Map showing original position of the cross, new position in 1790 and its 1981 position.

Barochan Cross is an ancient Scottish Celtic Christian cross dated to the early Middle Ages, between the 8th and the 11th century. It was originally located on the northside of Barochan burn, about 2 km north of Houston in Renfrewshire, then moved to a position nearby on top of Corslie Hill in 1790. It remained there for the next 187 years, in an exposed position that caused significant damage to the cross. In 1977, it was taken to Stenhouse Conservation Centre in Edinburgh for preservation. Once repaired it was decided it couldn't return to its exposed position, that resulted in the 1981 decision to move it to Paisley Abbey to protect it from the elements.

Barochan Cross is one of six known Christian crosses remaining from the Kingdom of Strathclyde—the others are held at the Govan Stones, namely the Govan Cross (also known as the Jordanhill Cross), the Sun Stone, the Cuddy Stane and the Inverted Cross, and the Netherton Cross in Hamilton Old Parish Church.

== Description ==
The Barochan Cross was constructed using a pale sandstone. It is approximately 3.4 metres (11 ft) in height with 0.9 metres (3.0 ft) of the base designed to fit in the ground.

== Interpretation ==
Barochan Cross was one of the remaining Celtic crosses from the medieval period that is still standing. The first known examination of the cross' carvings were made by the antiquarian and genealogist John Stuart who published his drawings in "Sculptured stones of Scotland" in 1856.

In 1919, the Scottish archeologist Ludovic McLellan Mann (1869–1955) published a pamphlet "War Memorials and the Barochan Cross, Renfrewshire" on the cross. Mann rejected the idea that the designs on the cross were secular in nature. He believed the scenes on the cross corresponded with specific biblical episodes. He posited that the head of a man, positioned between the two beasts (that he saw as lions) (now eroded) was the biblical figure of Daniel. The two large figures and the smaller figure were seen by Mann as representing a passage from the Book of Exodus. Regarding the hunting scene, he believed it depicted the conversion of the sinner to the Christian church. On the other side of the cross, the four figures represented the four gospels, Mathew, Mark, Luke and John. He believed the designs suggested a moral teachings.

Barochan Cross frontispiece carvings, drawn by John Stuart in 1856

Barochan Cross backpiece carvings

Historic Environment Scotland statement of significance argues that its tall height emphasises Calvary symbolism. This is reflected in the statement of significance of the 9th century Dupplin Cross in Perth and Kinross that has similar design that demonstrate that "Christianity is used to legitimise kingship".

However, it is unlikely that a definitive definition for the purpose of the designs will be offered. An examination of the cross as an object within the Scottish medieval landscape identified two different aspects, deemed the "military landscape" and the "religious landscape". Looking at the religious landscape, Christianity spread across the lands that would become Scotland from the early 6th century, if not before. From that point, Christian symbolism embodied in building of churches, shrines, holy wells and many other Christian monuments spread throughout Renfrewshire that in turn were embodied in the many ecclesiastical place-names in the county. By the 7th century, christianity was well established, signifying its prominence on the landscape and by the modern era over 100 churches within Renfrewshire had been built. The symbolism of the military landscape is taken from the huge range of military effects beginning with Roman forts sited on Barochan Hill, later followed by medieval castles constructed in Ranfurly in Bridge of Weir and Crookston in Pollok, Glasgow. This was followed by memorials for the First World War and Second World War, and in the modern era Bishopton Royal Ordanance factory and Cold War bunkers in Houston and Barrhead. Indeed, the cross's warrior designs attest to the changing political, military and religious landscapes.

== Relocation ==
In 1790, the cross was moved by the local laird Malcolm Fleming, whose family had owned the land since the 14th century, from its position at the Mill of Barochan, to a position on top of Corslie Hill, described as some 11 chain lengths or 726 feet (221 m) from its previous position. The position on the hill where the cross was placed was once the location of the former baronial house of the Fleming family that was reputedly burnt-down by English during the 1296 invasion of Scotland by Edward I of England. Moving the cross was part of a wider trend amongst landed elites at the time, in an attempt to improve the landscape to prove ownership and increase social status. By that point in the 18th century, the cross had lost much of symbolic power as a religious fixture or marker of kingly power, but still a place of myth and had become a tourist attraction, popular with day trippers from Glasgow.

== Revaluation ==
An undated image of Barochan Cross but likely to have been taken c. 1924 when the cross was surveyed and photographed.

When the cross was moved in 1790, it split into several pieces and had to be reassembled. In 1894, a storm caused the cross to split into three pieces and it was taken to a local farm to be repaired. An 1894 letter to the Glasgow Herald celebrated the locally cherished object but also illustrated how the care of the cross was in the hands of local people who were essentially amateurs. With the rise of Antiquarianism in the early 18th century, there was potential for the cross to be collected i.e. stolen but it also led to the collection of histories, that were often developed from local myths. This led to a reappraisal of historical objects in the heritage landscape like Barochan Cross that by the 19th century had resulted in the formalisation of state controlled preservation organisations that sought to envelop historical monuments like Barochan Cross within their purview.

In 1882, the Ancient Monuments Protection Act 1882 decreed that certain ancient monuments should be protected. In 1908, the Royal Commission on the Historical Monuments of Scotland enacted a survey of all historical monuments on public land in Scotland and this was further expanded and strengthened by the Ancient Monuments Consolidation and Amendment Act 1913 that classified monuments on private land that were subject to preservation. In 1924, Barochan Cross was taken into statutory protection as a national ancient monument under the 1913 act, when the landowner Sir Charles Renshaw died and his widow requested protection before the estate was sold. In 2004, that statutory protection was formally detailed in what was known as a "Statement of Significance" that is maintained by Historic Environment Scotland. The document defines the evidence of what makes the Barochan Cross unique within the Scottish heritage landscape and the types of current and future actions that are needed to maintain that uniqueness, within an established heritage framework. Firstly, Barochan Cross is unique as an early medieval Strathclyde cross and secondly it is a key example of the Strathlyde school of sculpture.

From 1924 onwards, the cross was periodically examined by inspectors to access its condition. In 1926, a metal fence was built to protect the monument from cows. In 1947, it was reported to the Scottish arm of the Council for British Archaeology that the cross was undergoing significant deterioration and that it should be moved to a parish church to protect it. In March 1977, the cross was taken to Stenhouse Conservation Centre in Edinburgh for repair, where the senior preservation officer stated it must not return to its exposed hilltop position. In May 1977, the Parish of Houston and Killelan Kirk were asked if the cross could be sited in the church on Kirk road. However, the request was rejected as the minister believed the growing numbers of parishioners would endanger the cross and they considered the church floor wasn't strong enough to support it. A second choice was to move the cross to Castle Semple Collegiate Church in Lochwinnoch, but it would have provided marginal protection as the 16th century church was a ruin with no roof and the location was remote, reducing the potential number of visitors. In 1980, it resulted in the location being rejected. In 1981 it was finally decided to move it to Paisley Abbey. Curiously the socket stone remains on Corslie Hill and the reason for it is unknown as there is no official documentation recording why it was left.

== Conservation ==
In Stenhouse Conservation Centre in Edinburgh, it was restored over a period of three-years. Prior to its removal it had undergone significant decay that had been accelerated due to acid rain but other factors in the past had also damaged it. A fence has been recommended in the 1924 report to protect it from grazing cattle who used it as a scratching post but also stated that its exposed position led it to be a convenient perch for birds, whose excrement caused surface damage. The 1924 report also detailed the crude repairs that had been made when the cross was damaged in the 1894 storm, using flat iron bars to tie the shaft together, steel dowels to secure the headpiece and plain mortar to hold the stone pieces together, that had resulted in damage to the carvings, contaminating the sandstone and making them pulverise to the touch. A 1947 assessment by inspectors recorded that the cross was covered in Lichen and recommended that it be physically removed by washing, which caused further surface damage, including blunting of detail in the carvings. A 1973 report recommended the joints should be repointed to stop the ingress of water that was turning the iron to rust but made no mention of removing the iron.

To conserve it, the head was reattached using a polyester resin and the joints closed and pointed with a mortar mixture made of shellac resin, sand and meths. The iron dowels were removed and replaced by phosphor bronze dowels that were corrosion resistant. The damaged carvings on the body were recast with the new mortar and recarved on the edges and then injected with a mix of shellac resin and sand to stabilise each repair.

== Bibliography ==
- Anderson, William (1864). The Scottish Nation. Vol. II. Edinburgh: A Fullarton and Co.
- Calcluth, Helen (2023). "Barochan Cross". Renfrewshire Local History Forum. Archived from the original on 24 February 2024.
- Coventry, Martin; Miller, Joyce (2003). Churches and Abbeys of Scotland. Vol. 1. Cockenzie: Goblinshead. ISBN 978-1-899874-29-3.
- Edensor, Tim (2022). Landscape, materiality and heritage: an object biography. Singapore: Palgrave Macmillan. ISBN 978-981-19-7030-6.
- Lynch, Michael (2007). The Oxford Companion to Scottish History. Oxford: Oxford University Press. p. 274. ISBN 978-0-19-923482-0.
- Maim, L. M. (19 April 1919). "War Memorials and the Barochan Cross". Westminster: The Spectator Archive. The Spectator.
- Ritchie, J.N. Graham (2002). "Ludovic McLellan Mann (1869–1955): 'The eminent archaeologist'". Proceedings of the Society of Antiquaries. 132: 43–64.
- Stuart, John, 1813-1877 (May 1856). Sculptured stones of Scotland. Aberdeen: Printed for the Spalding club. p. 322.
- "OS1/26/10/22". Scotland Places. Edinburgh: National Records of Scotland, National Library of Scotland, Historic Environment Scotland. October 2023. Archived from the original on 7 June 2024.
- "Barochan Cross | Archaeology Notes". Canmore. Historic Environment Scotland. 1985. Archived from the original on 21 March 2024.
- "Publications by the Royal Commission on the Ancient and Historical Monuments of Scotland". Canmore. Edinburgh: Historic Environment Scotland. 1908.
- "Barochan Hill". Canmore. Edinburgh: Historic Environment Scotland. Archived from the original on 27 July 2024.
