= Black Creek (Toronto) =

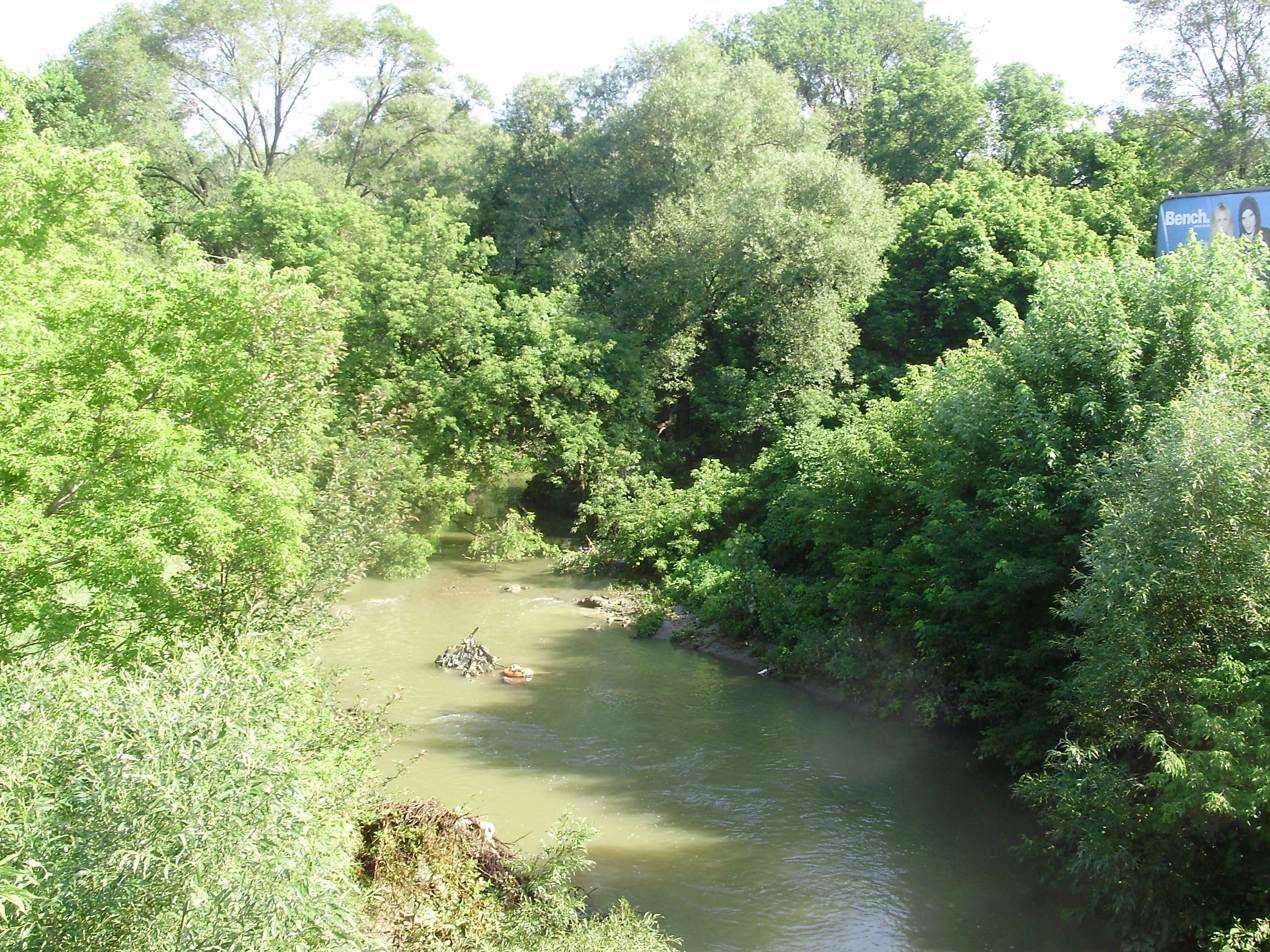
- Black Creek at Eglinton Avenue West

- Location of the mouth of the creek in Toronto

Location
- Country: Canada
- Province: Ontario
- Region: Golden Horseshoe
- Municipalities: Toronto; Vaughan

Physical characteristics
- Source: retention basin
  - location: Vaughan, Regional Municipality of York
  - coordinates: 43°49′35″N 79°33′34″W
  - elevation: 210 m (690 ft)
- Mouth: Humber River
  - location: Toronto
  - coordinates: 43°40′09″N 79°30′41″W
  - elevation: 89 m (292 ft)
- Basin size: 66 km^{2} (25 sq mi)

Black Creek is a river in the Golden Horseshoe region of Ontario, Canada. It flows from the city of Vaughan in the Regional Municipality of York to the Humber River in Toronto. Black Creek is smaller than most of the waterways in the Greater Toronto Area.

== Course ==
The creek begins in the Vellore neighbourhood of Vaughan at the outflow from a Retention basin just north-west of the intersection of Weston Road and Rutherford Road (Fossil Hill Pond) at an elevation of 210 metres (689 ft). It flows southeast under Highway 400 at Langstaff Road and heads south along the side of the highway, before turning abruptly east near Pennsylvania Ave. and abruptly south again at Jane St. The creek continues south in the vicinity of Jane St., before passing under Highway 7, Highway 407 and Steeles to reach Toronto at the eponymous Black Creek Pioneer Village open-air historic museum. It passes the main York University campus and heads into the Downsview area in a forested ravine. It continues south in a natural setting, passing in short culverts underneath Shoreham Drive, Finch Ave. West, Grandravine Drive and Sheppard Ave. West, before turning to the west and arriving back at Jane St. south of Sheppard Ave. After crossing under Jane St., the creek passes through Oakdale Golf & Country Club and Chalkfarm Park. At the southeast end of Chalkfarm Park, near Jane St. and Wilson Ave., the creek enters a concrete channel, continuing roughly south along Jane St. under Highway 401.

From Jane St. and Highway 401, the creek continues south in a concrete channel until Queens Drive. The creek is then mostly in a natural state as it flows through the Upwood and Westview Greenbelts, Trethewey Park East and Keelesdale Park, with segments of culvert where it passes under city streets. Beginning near Jane St. and Highway 401, the creek valley also provides the routing for the eponymous Black Creek Drive, which follows the creek south to past Eglinton Avenue West to Weston Road in the neighbourhood of Mount Dennis. South of Weston Road, Black Creek runs in a man-made concrete channel in the median of Humber Boulevard, continuing to the south of Alliance Avenue and through Lambton Golf Club, and reaches its mouth as a left tributary of the Humber River near Scarlett Road and Dundas Street West at an elevation of 89 metres (292 ft).

The environmental health of Black Creek and its watershed has been an important issue in Toronto and the GTA for decades. The creek can be split into 3 general zones: source-Highway 407, Highway 407-Weston Road, and Weston Road-Humber River. From its source in Vaughan to approximately Highway 407, Black Creek runs primarily in drainage ditches through the sprawling Vaughan Business Park, an industrial area bounded by Rutherford Road to the north, CN MacMillan Yard to the east, Highway 7 to the south and Highway 400 to the west. Within the business park, it receives water from several other storm water retention ponds. Between Highway 407 and Weston Road, the creek is situated in a more natural, forested environment, albeit sharing the creek valley with Black Creek Drive. South of Weston Road continuing to the mouth of Black Creek at the Humber River, almost the entire length of the creek consists of concrete channels running through parkland and along residential streets. Black Creek is susceptible to chemical runoff from the 2 golf courses the creek passes within the city of Toronto as well as the industrial areas upstream in Vaughan. In addition, the highly channelized nature of the creek means that during times of heavy rain or snowmelt, the creek's lower reaches within Toronto as well as parts of the Humber River downstream become highly susceptible to flooding. The channelized portions of the creek south of Weston Road have garnered the nickname "Toronto's LA River", in reference to the barren, concrete channel carrying the LA River through Los Angeles, California.

=== Downsview Park ===
An artificial man made storm water pond, Walkway Pond, flows out through an underground channel to Downsview Dells to Humber River via Black Creek.

=== Lavender Creek ===
Lavender Creek's source is near Dufferin Street and Eglinton Avenue West. It has long been buried from Fairbank Park to east of Weston Road and north-east of the Gunns Road intersection. It travels underground under Weston Road west through a culvert before re-emerging. From north of Gunns Road, the watercourse continues west to Symes Road and continues north, behind the homes on Hilldale Road to meet Black Creek south-west of Humber Boulevard and Alliance Avenue.

== August 2005 flooding ==
On August 19, 2005, Black Creek was the site of heavy flooding as a result of extremely heavy rains that afternoon. Its overflow destroyed a culvert on Finch Avenue.

== Communities ==
- Lambton, Toronto - residential area in Toronto
- Mount Dennis, Toronto - light to medium industrial area - including former home to Kodak Canada and new Toronto Transit Commission bus garage
- Downsview, Toronto
- Edgeley, Vaughan - commercial and light industrial area
- Vellore, Vaughan - residential area
- Weston, Toronto - residential area

== Attractions and protected areas ==
- York University, Toronto
- Oakdale Golf and Country Club, Toronto
- Beechwood Cemetery, Vaughan
- Weston-400 North Industrial Area, Vaughan
- North York Sheridan Mall, Toronto
- Lambton Golf and Country Club, Toronto
- Oakdale Golf & Country Club
- Chris Tonks Arena, Toronto
- Derrydowns Park
- Topcliffe Park
- Northwood Park
- Downsview Dells Park
- Chalkfarm Park
- Upwood Park
- Coronation Park
- Keelesdale Park
- Smythe Park
- Lambton Park
- Glen Scarlett Park
- Rockcliffe-Symthe Gulley

== See also ==
- List of rivers of Ontario
