= William Irving (architect) =

Canadian architect

- Born: 1800; Edinburgh, Scotland
- Died: June 11 1883 (aged 82–83)
- Occupation: Architect

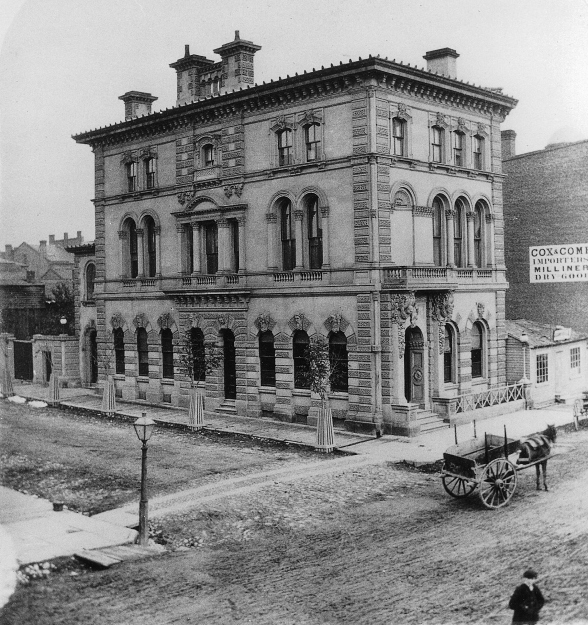
Toronto branch of Ontario Bank

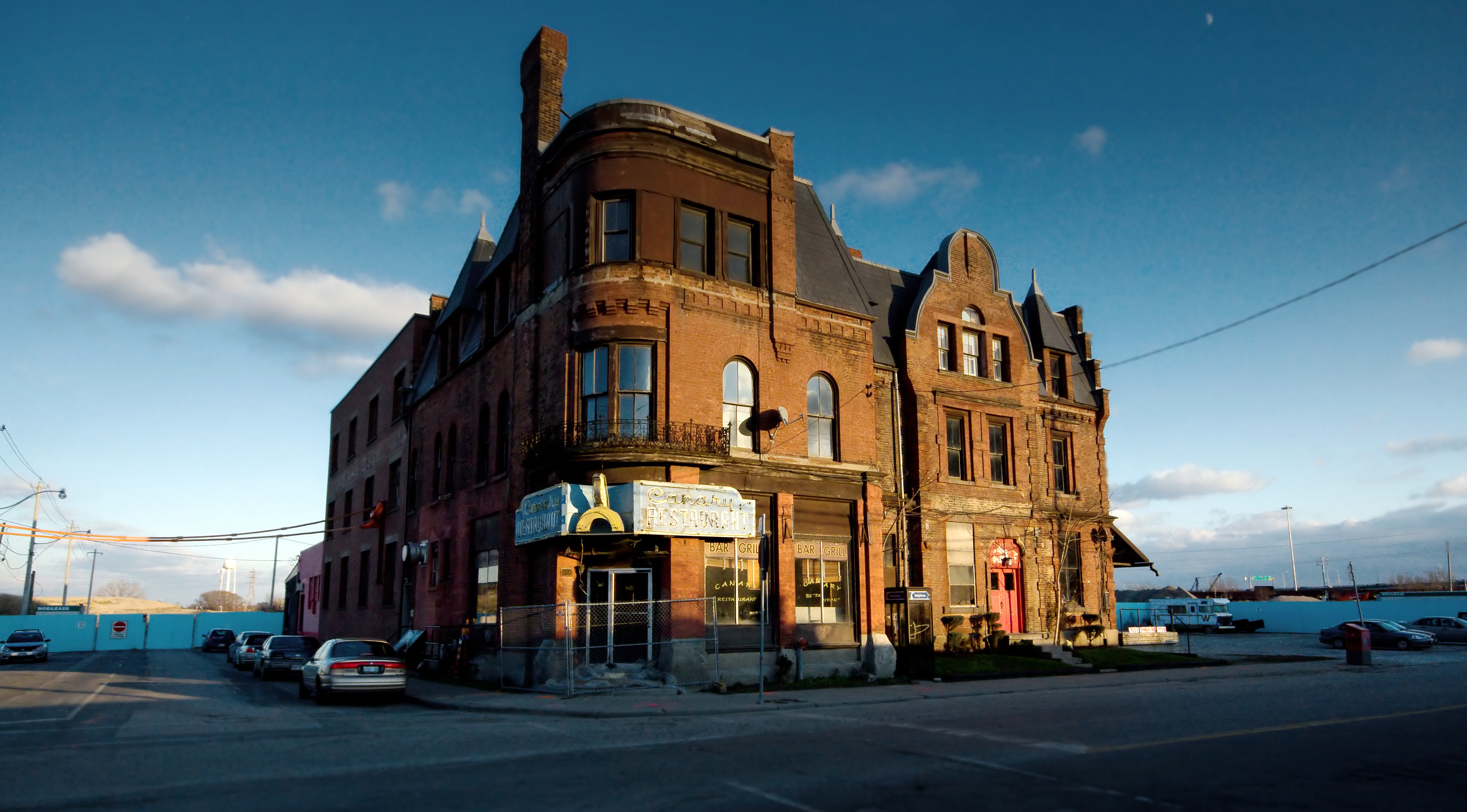

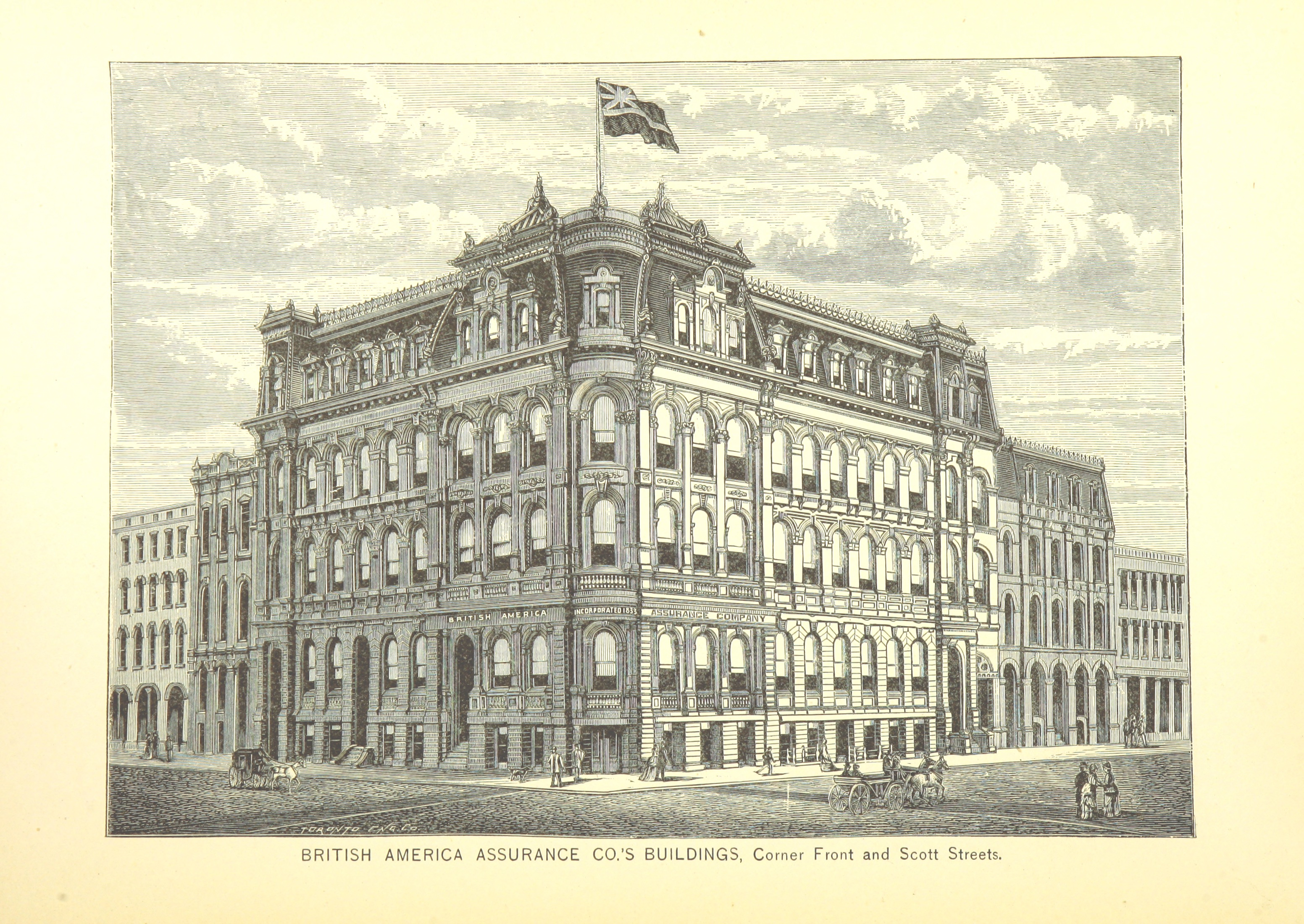
The British America Assurance Company building

William Irving (1830 – June 11, 1883) was an architect in Toronto, Canada. His work included the original 1879 Dominion Bank headquarters building at One King West and British America Assurance Co. building (1877).

Irving was born in Edinburgh, Scotland. He apprenticed to Joseph Sheard and married his daughter. Joseph Sheard, a prominent builder and architect in the city at that time. Their work included Cawthra House (1852) and the Ontario Bank in Toronto (1861). He opened his own office in 1862. Edward J. Lennox worked in his office. He received first prize for architectural drawing at the Provincial Exhibition in Ottawa.

== Works ==
- George Brown's home (1874-1876) at 186 Beverley Street with Edward F. Hutchins as building supervisor now used as conference centre with tenant offices
- 440-450 Queen Street West (1876) - still standing as store with second storey residences
- Cherry Street School/Cherry Street Hotel at Front and Cherry Streets 1869 additions on the original 1859 building by Joseph Sheard
- Ontario Bank at 28 Wellington Street East at Scotts Street 1861; demolished and now site of Wellington Square
- British America Assurance Company at northwest corner of Wellington and Scotts Street 1877; demolished
- Cawthra House at King and Bay Street; demolished 1948-1949 to make way for Bank of Nova Scotia Building 1949-1951 but mantel from the drawing room and the stone columns from doorway was saved and relocated to Joseph Cawthra House (Adamson Estate) at Cawthra Road near Queen Elizabeth Way in Port Credit as well as other parts relocated by descendant of William Cawthra to a home in Rosedale.
