= Albert William Austin =

Canadian businessman and golfer (1857–1934)

- Born: 27 March 1857; Toronto, Ontario, Canada
- Died: 5 July 1934 (aged 77); Toronto, Ontario, Canada
- Education: Upper Canada College
- Spouse: Mary Richmond Kerr (m. 1882)

Albert William Austin (27 March 1857 – 5 July 1934) was a Canadian businessman and golfer. The founder of Winnipeg's first streetcar system, he later served as president of Dominion Bank. He also founded the Lambton Golf and Country Club and represented Canada in golf at the 1904 Olympics.

== Life and career ==
Austin was born in Toronto as the youngest child of James Austin, a prominent businessman who founded the Dominion Bank. He attended Upper Canada College until age 14. That year, his father ended his formal schooling to apprentice him in the world of business. He was given a posting as a junior clerk at the bank. Three years later, he took a position in the grocery and import business of Senator Frank Smith.

In 1880, Austin moved to Winnipeg and, with investments from his father and Edmund Boyd Osler, founded the Winnipeg Street Railway Company, a horse-drawn streetcar service that was Winnipeg's first mass transit system. In 1892, the rival Winnipeg Electric Street Railway Company was formed. Running more modern cars, it sparked a price war. Austin challenged the rival firm's right to share the streets of Winnipeg, and he fought a legal battle that extended to the Judicial Committee of the Privy Council. Austin's firm lost and in 1894, the company was sold to its rival for $175,000. Soon after, Austin and his family moved back to Toronto.

In 1882, Austin married Mary Richmond Kerr, daughter of newspaper publisher Dawson Kerr. They had five children: James Percival (Percy) (1885–1954), Adele (1886–1968), Albert (Bertie) (1888–1913), Anna Kathleen (1892–1983), and Constance Margaret (1894–1966). Austin built his home at 122 Carlton Street (later as Havergal College / Rupert’s Land Girls School 1901-1954, demolished 1964).

Albert William Austin, by John Wycliffe Lowes Forster.

In 1897, Austin's father died and as the only surviving son, he inherited his father's business interests. Eventually, Austin would succeed his father as president of both the Dominion Bank and the Consumer's Gas Company. He also inherited Spadina House, the large home that his father had built for the family in 1866. Austin moved his family from Lowther Avenue to the home, and he lived there for the rest of his life. Today, Spadina House is a museum restored to how it would have been in the 1920s, when Austin and his family lived there. While Austin preserved the basic form of the house, many of the features that today survive date from his renovations.

Golf was a longstanding interest of Austin. He first set up a small course on his estate for family and friends. This expanded into the Spadina Golf Club, with a course at Spadina and St. Clair. That land could not permanently serve as a golf course, so in 1903, he purchased land along the Humber River and founded the Lambton Golf and Country Club. In the 1904 Olympics, a team from the Lambton club represented Canada in the golf tournament. The team consisted of Austin, his son Bertie, and the club champion George Lyon. At the Olympics, Austin finished 73rd out of 75 and did not qualify, while Bertie also did not pass the qualifier. Lyon did, and he went on to win the gold medal.

== Legacy ==
- Austin Street, Winnipeg (1872) is a residential street in the neighbourhood of North Point Douglas running from Pritchard Avenue to the railway tracks south of Sutherland Avenue, then briefly from Higgins Avenue to Henry Avenue.
