= Daniel Brooke Building =

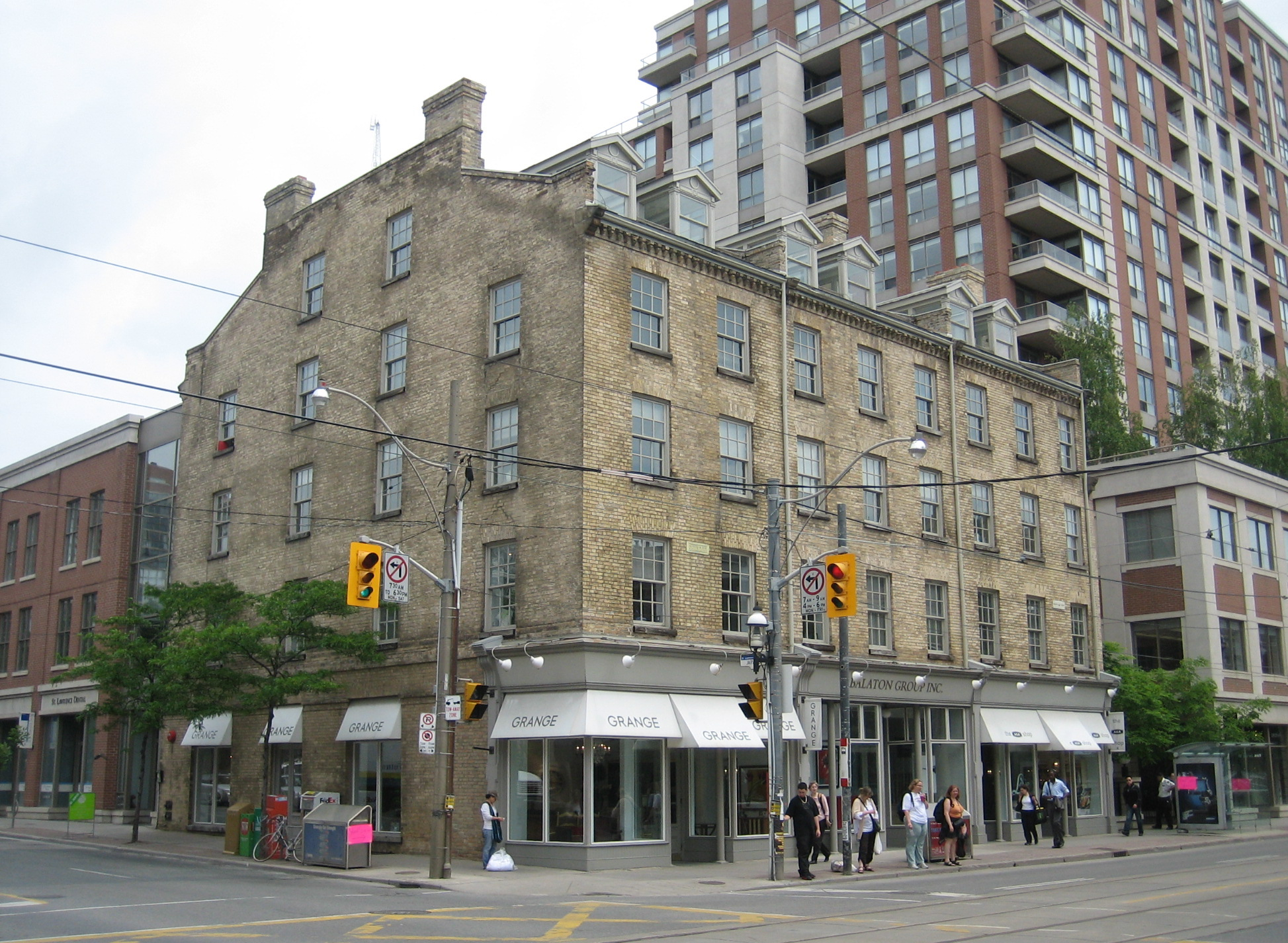
- Interactive map of the Daniel Brooke Building area

General information
- Architectural style: Georgian Revival
- Location: 150-154 King Street East, Toronto, Canada
- Coordinates: 43°39′02″N 79°22′18″W
- Completed: 1833
- Renovated: 1848–49, 1988

Daniel Brooke Building is a 19th-century Georgian building in Toronto, Ontario, Canada located on the northeast corner of Jarvis Street and King Street. The building is one of the last remaining buildings of the old Town of York. Built in 1833 for owners Daniel Brooke and John Murchison, it was rebuilt before 1849 and damaged by the Toronto Fire of 1849.

The building has been home to a number of commercial enterprises. In 1843, James Austin and Patrick Foy opened a retail and wholesale grocery business in the building. This was Austin's first venture in what would eventually make him one of Canada's most prominent 19th-century business leaders. The grocery operated at the location until 1859. After the 1849 fire, the building housed The Patriot newspaper, whose offices on the south-east corner had been destroyed. From the 1930s, the lower level housed the Sportsman's Shop, a Toronto icon that mostly sold army/navy surplus. The upper levels were mostly abandoned.

On June 20, 1973, the City of Toronto government listed the property on the City of Toronto Heritage Property Inventory. and designated it as being of cultural heritage value or interest, under Part IV of the Ontario Heritage Act by City of Toronto By-law No.793-85 on October 23, 1985.

In the 1980s, the property came under the ownership of King George Properties, which rehabilitated the building in 1988 and adjoining heritage properties 61–63 Jarvis Street (1860) and 172 King Street East (1907). In 1998, the block was integrated into a condominium project known as King George Square, with a new tower in behind.

== See also ==
- List of oldest buildings and structures in Toronto
