= Aeneas Shaw =

Major General in York Militia, Canadian Army

Major General Aeneas Shaw
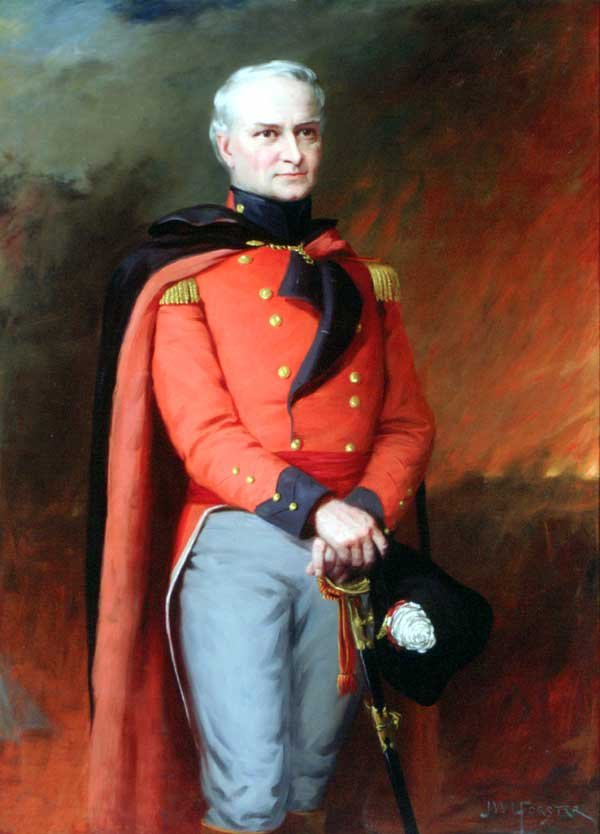
- Aeneas Shaw by John Wycliffe Lowes Forster

Member of the Executive Council of Upper Canada for York
- In office June 21, 1794 – 1807
- Monarch: George III

Personal details
- Born: c. 1740 Pitlochry, Scotland
- Died: February 6, 1814 York, Upper Canada
- Party: Family Compact

Military service
- Allegiance: British Empire; Upper Canada
- Rank: Major General
- Unit: Queen's Rangers
- Battles/wars: American War of Independence; War of 1812

Aeneas Shaw (c. 1740 – February 6, 1814) was a Scottish soldier and political figure in Upper Canada. He was born in Pitlochry, Scotland c. 1740 at Tordarroch House. Shaw was the second son born to his father, the chief of Clan Ay, named Angus Shaw. His mother was named Anne Dallas of Cantray. Shaw came to Staten Island, New York around 1770. He enlisted in the Queen's Rangers at the start of the American War of Independence, later rising to the rank of captain. After the siege of Yorktown, he settled in the Nashwaak River area of New Brunswick. He rejoined the re-formed Queen's Rangers and moved to Kingston in Upper Canada in 1792. When he was appointed to the Executive Council and Legislative Council of Upper Canada in 1794, he moved to Niagara.

In 1793, he helped prepare the site for the new capital at York. In 1796, he was appointed lieutenant for York County. In 1811, as tensions increased between Britain and the United States, Shaw became a major general in the Canadian Militia, being responsible for training new recruits. However, colonial legislation only required militia recruits to train for three days a month. Shaw's troops did not perform well during the battle of York during the War of 1812. He died at York in 1814.

Shaw would marry two women: first a woman named Ann Gosline (whom together had 10 children) and the second was named Margaret Hickman.

One of the children of Shaw, his daughter, Sophia, is said to have been engaged to Major-General Sir Isaac Brock, who died at the Battle of Queenston Heights in 1812.
