= British America Assurance Company =

Canadian insurance company

- Formerly: British America Fire and Life Assurance Company (1833–1852)
- Industry: Fire insurance
- Founded: 13 February 1833
- Defunct: 27 February 1976
- Fate: Renamed the Royal Insurance Company of Canada
- Headquarters: 88 Scott Street, Toronto, Ontario

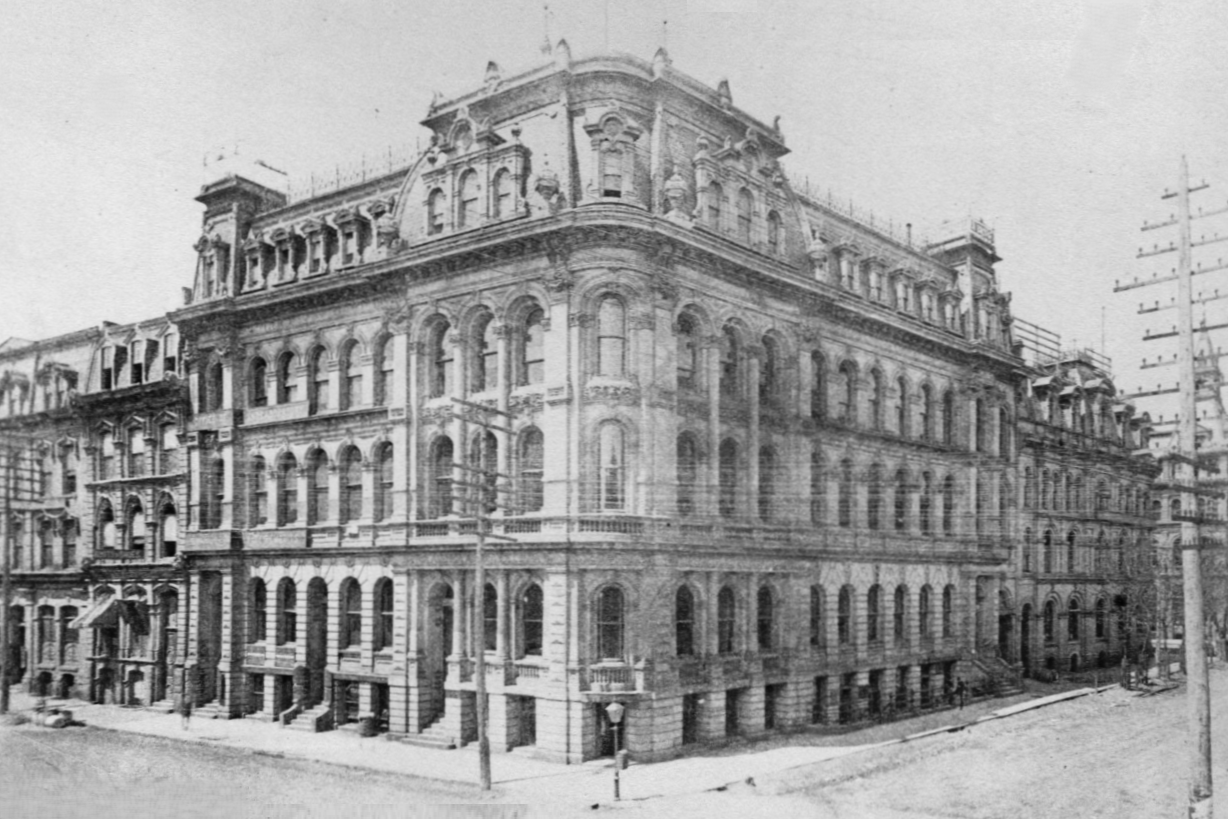
The company's 1876 head office at Front and Scott, designed by William Irving.

The British America Assurance Company was a fire insurance company established in York, Upper Canada in 1833. An impressive headquarters building for it was designed by William Irving in 1877. The company expanded into the U.S. It also operated in Sydney and Adelaide. The company took hits during major conflagrations, such as the San Francisco fire of 1906.

== History ==
In 1892, British America formed an alliance with the Western Assurance Company, whereby the two companies would retain the distinct identities but would come under the control of a single board of directors. Thereafter, the alliance was known as the Western Assurance–British America Assurance Group.

The Canadian subsidiary of the Royal Insurance Company (now RSA Insurance Group) acquired the British America Assurance Company and the Western Assurance Company in 1961. At a special meeting of shareholders on 27 February 1976, the company voted to change its name to the Royal Insurance Company of Canada. In 1978, the Royal Insurance Company of Canada and Western Assurance merged into a new corporation under the Royal name. However, Western remained a brand of Royal. In 2021, Royal Sun Alliance was acquired by Intact Financial.

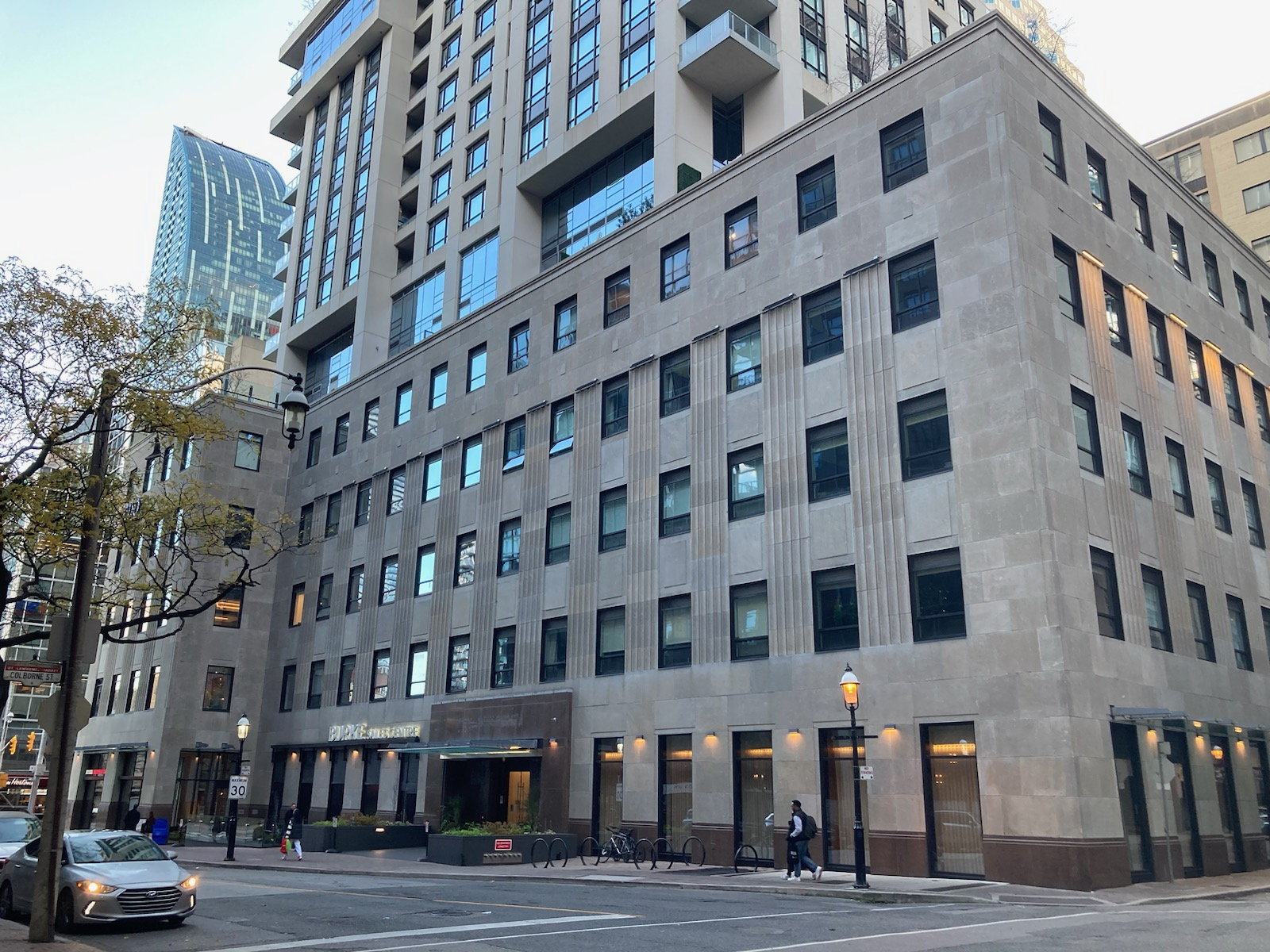
The 1952 Western–British America Building at 88 Scott Street. It was designed by Parrott Tambling & Witmer.

William Botsford Jarvis was one of the company's founders.
