= Spadina House =

Spadina Museum
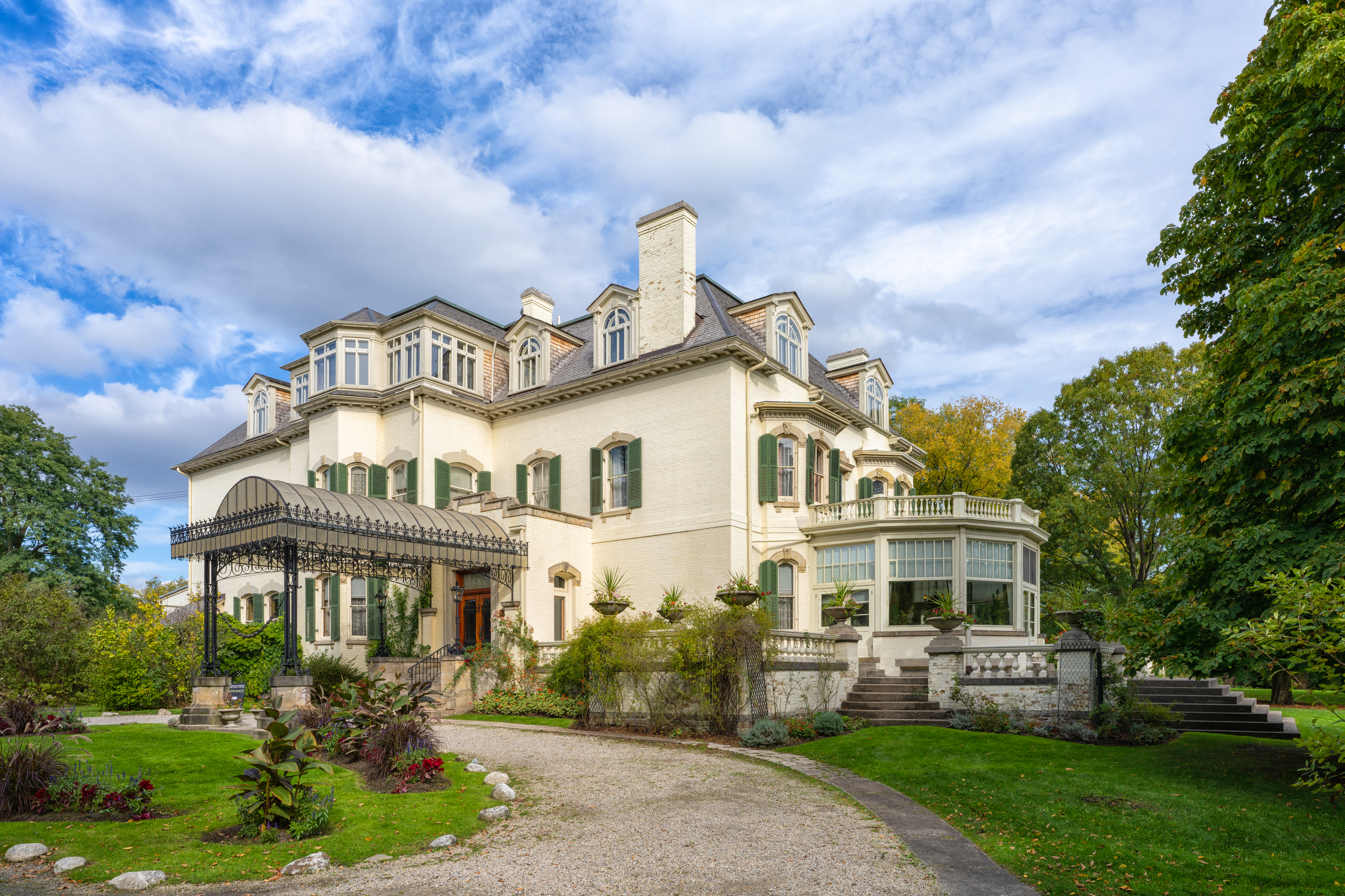
- View toward the front entrance in 2021

General information
- Type: Mansion
- Location: 285 Spadina Road; Toronto, Ontario, Canada
- Coordinates: 43.679023°N 79.40815°W
- Current tenants: Historic house museum (since 1984)
- Construction started: 1866
- Client: James Austin
- Owner: City of Toronto and Ontario Heritage Trust

Design and construction
- Architects: Vaux Chadwick (1896); Eustace Bird (1905–1912)

Website
- Official website

National Historic Site of Canada
- Designated: July 26, 2019

Ontario Heritage Act
- Designated: March 31, 1976

Spadina Museum (/spəˈdiːnə/), also known as Spadina House, is a historic mansion at 285 Spadina Road in Toronto, Ontario. It is now a historic house museum operated by the City of Toronto's Economic Development & Culture division. The museum preserves the house much as it existed and developed historically. The art, decor and architecture of the house used to reflect the contemporary styles of the 1860s through the 1930s, including Italianate, Victorian, Edwardian, Arts and Crafts, Art Nouveau, Art Deco and Colonial Revival styles. The museum closed for a year for extensive interior and exterior renovations. When it re-opened to the public on October 24, 2010, it was decorated in the style of the inter-war era of the 1920s and 1930s. The estate's gardens reflect the landscape during the Austin family's occupation of the house.

== History ==
The first house constructed on the site was built in 1818 by Dr. William Warren Baldwin. He named his 200-acre (81 ha) property and estate Spadina, which derived from the Ojibwe word espadinong, or Ishpadinaa which translates as "hill" or "sudden rise of land"; it is located at the top of an escarpment. Baldwin himself designed the two storey wood-frame house. The house burnt down in 1835, and owing to the three mile (5 km) trek from the estate into York, he moved to a house on Front Street. He built a smaller country estate on the property in 1838.

In 1866, the property was acquired by James Austin, founder of The Dominion Bank and Consumers Gas. By this time, parts of the property had been sold off, and what Austin purchased covered 80 acres (32 ha). In the 19th and early 20th century the area was the wealthiest in Toronto, with a number of Toronto's leading families having large estates. Austin subdivided and sold off the land west of Spadina Road in 1889, which amounted to 40 acres (16 ha). In 1892, James Austin turned over the house, and 20 acres (8.1 ha) of the property to his son, Albert William Austin. Albert Austin expanded the house in several renovations, including the addition of a third floor in 1912. He sold much of the property to the City of Toronto in 1913 for the construction of the St. Clair Reservoir. Albert Austin died in 1934.

The last member of the family to live in the house was Anna Kathleen Thompson, a daughter of Albert Austin, who lived there from 1942 until 1982. The aged house had outdated wiring and needed a thorough overhaul, that would have been far more expensive than rebuilding it. While the house could have been sold to private interests, the family decided instead to donate the house and all of its furnishings to the city so it could be preserved as a historic landmark rather than alternatively redeveloped, as had occurred with many of the large historic estates in the area. In 1984, it opened as a museum, jointly owned by the city and the Ontario Heritage Foundation and operated by the City of Toronto. The museum is especially known for its gardens.

== Museum operation ==
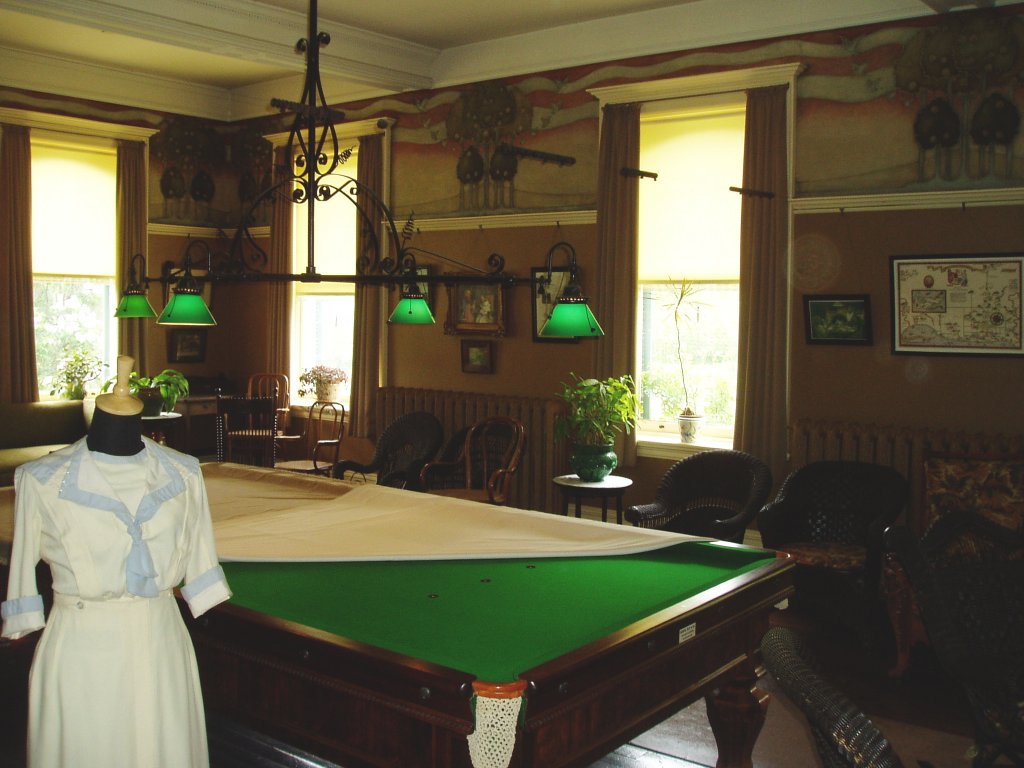
Billiard room in Spadina House. The house is presently a historic museum operated by the City of Toronto.

The Spadina historic house and gardens is one of ten historic museums operated and owned by the City of Toronto. The museum's visitors learn and experience how Torontonians lived during the early 20th Century. Tours are scheduled at set times each day, that explore political, economic and social themes of that time period.

The Spadina Historic house is known as a desirable location for photography, film shots, weddings, and corporate functions.

== Description ==
The house is at the southern end of the northern section of Spadina Road, on top of Davenport Hill, an escarpment which was the shore of prehistoric Lake Iroquois. Immediately east was Sir John Craig Eaton and Lady Eaton's massive Italianate palace and estate, Ardwold. Just around the corner on Austin Terrace, on the lot adjacent to Spadina House, is Casa Loma, a stately pile built in 1911 by Major-General Sir Henry Mill Pellatt.

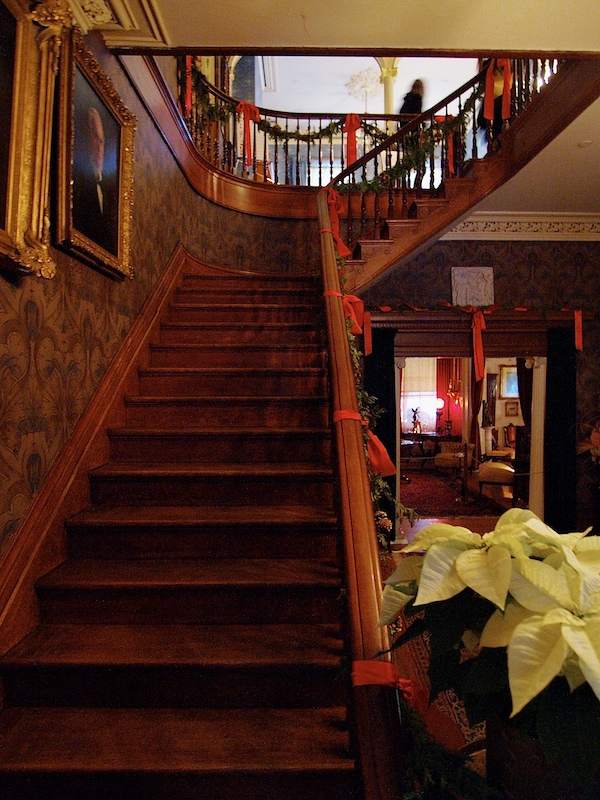
The interior of the house showcases Victorian and Edwardian styles of residential architecture.

The architecture of the Austin Home is inspired by the Italliante architectural style combined with elements of later Victorian and Edwardian styles. The exterior features that it is known for are its bay windows, its brick and stone terrace, the brick chimneys, and the botanically themed carved keystones. The estate ground's oldest building is a wood stable from the mid-19th century, which was attached to the old coach house, and was once used as a gardener's residence until the end of the 1920s. The interior of the house showcases the Victorian and Edwardian components through its floating staircase in the central hall, high baseboards, ceiling medallions, plaster crown mouldings and hardwood floors. This home 55 rooms, in which various new art pieces and decorations are showcased.

The remodelling in 2010 added specific studied reproductions of the original family's artefacts. The wallpaper, the kitchen, the bathroom, and bedroom closet were remodelled. Stuffed wolves found in the family's archives are now placed at the entryway of the museum. Additionally, the artwork included in the remodel was a statue from France of a woman. Due to the blue and pink colors of the sculpture, the museum staff nicknamed it “Wonder Woman”. Another part of the remodelling was the restoration of a mechanical chair used by Albert Austen when he lost mobility. The entirety of the chair moves and is kept as an artefact as it was designed by him for himself. This chair resembles a “La-Z-Boy chair". The City of Toronto invested about CA$600,000 towards the revitalization of the Spadina House to present day.

The natural landscape of the Spadina House is protected by law under the “Ravine and Natural Feature Protection By-law”. This estate originally included 200 acres of farmland. There were 200 feet of trees between the house's initial frame and the edge of the ridge in the south of the property, still providing an unbroken view of Downtown Toronto and Lake Iroquois. Spadina House's landscape features include formal gardens, the old Orchard, the stone pergola, the fieldstone wall, and the Battery constructed by James and Susan. There are presently 6 acres of restored 1905 Gardens. These 6 acres hold more than 300 varieties of flowers and vegetables.

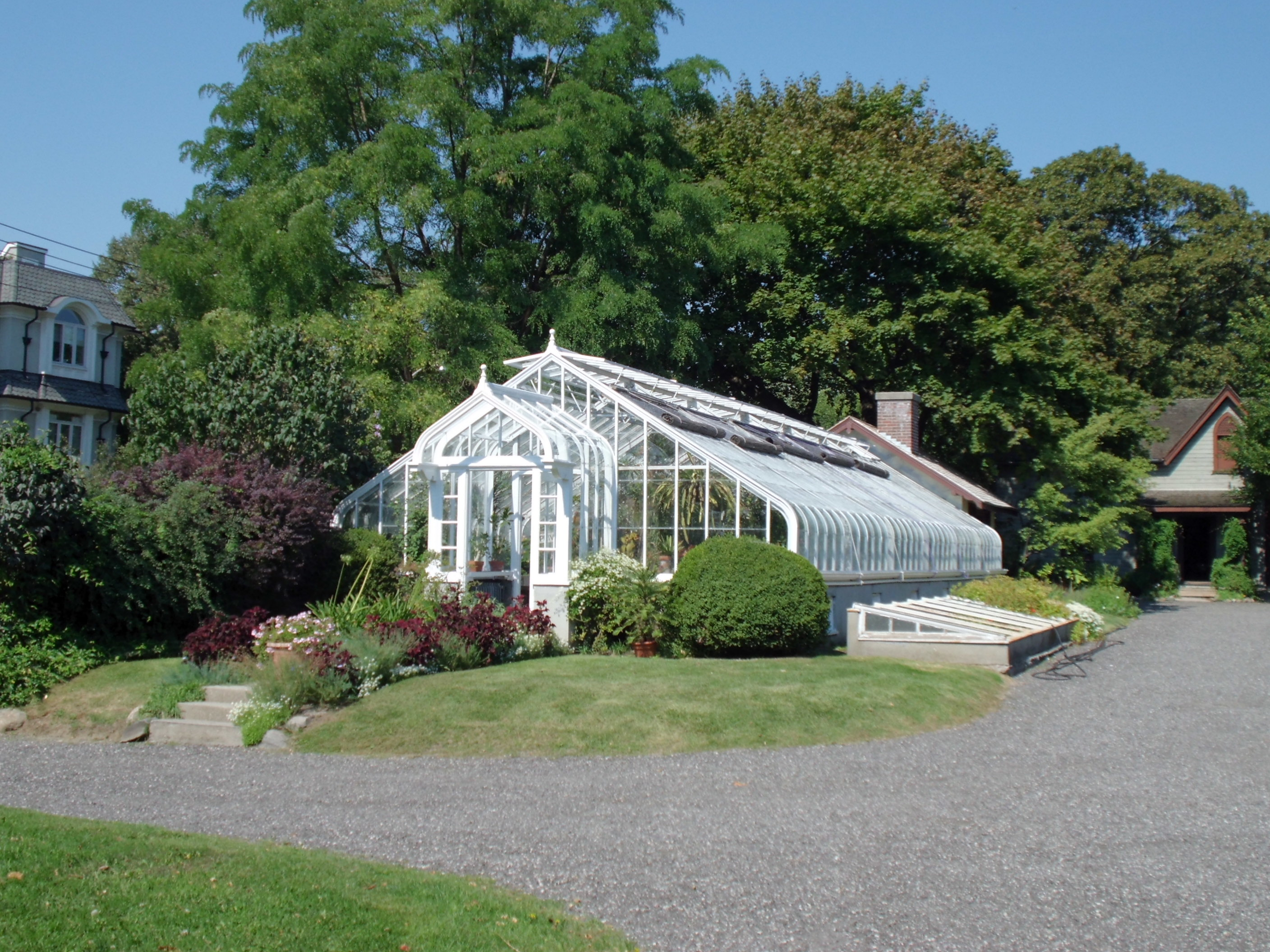
Greenhouse located at Spadina House.

The name and pronunciation of the “Spadina House” is rooted from the Ojibway word “Espadinong” or "Ishpadinaa" which signifies “Hill”. It was adopted as a name for the home and the street by Baldwin. Many Torontonians follow a convention of pronouncing Spadina Road with the i as /aɪ/ as in mine, and Spadina House with the i as in /iː/ as in ski. Occasionally, Spadina Road is pronounced the second way. South of Bloor Street, however, Spadina Road becomes Spadina Avenue, which is always pronounced the first way. The distinction between the two ways was once an economic class marker in Toronto with the upper classes favouring the second pronunciation. Now, however, even the official TTC stop announcements pronounce the i in Spadina as the one in mine.

== Awards ==
Spadina Museum was jointly awarded the Peggi Armstrong Public Archaeology Award along with the Ontario Heritage Trust in 2004.

Spadina Museum was awarded the Ontario Museum Association Award of Merit in conjunction with Dawn Roach Bowen for their Black History Month programme Meet Mrs. Pipkin in 2002. Mrs. Pipkin was a laundress at the Spadina house in the 1860s, where she came after escaping slavery in the United States.

“Spadina Museum was nominated for the 2013 Toronto Heritage Award in the William Greer Architectural Conservation and Craftsmanship category”

This award category was created to honor the owners who restored structures or buildings that, either have existed for 40 years or more, or are included in the inventory of “Toronto’s Heritage Properties”. The jury who decides on the winners of the award focus on several different aspects, such as: whether the new building or structure meets current needs, was restored using the appropriate materials, kept a significant portion of the original building's design, use of sound conservation and of course quality of craftsmanship.

== See also ==
- List of museums in Toronto
- Mary Lake Augustinian Monastery
