= Western Assurance Company =

Canadian insurance company (1851–2025)

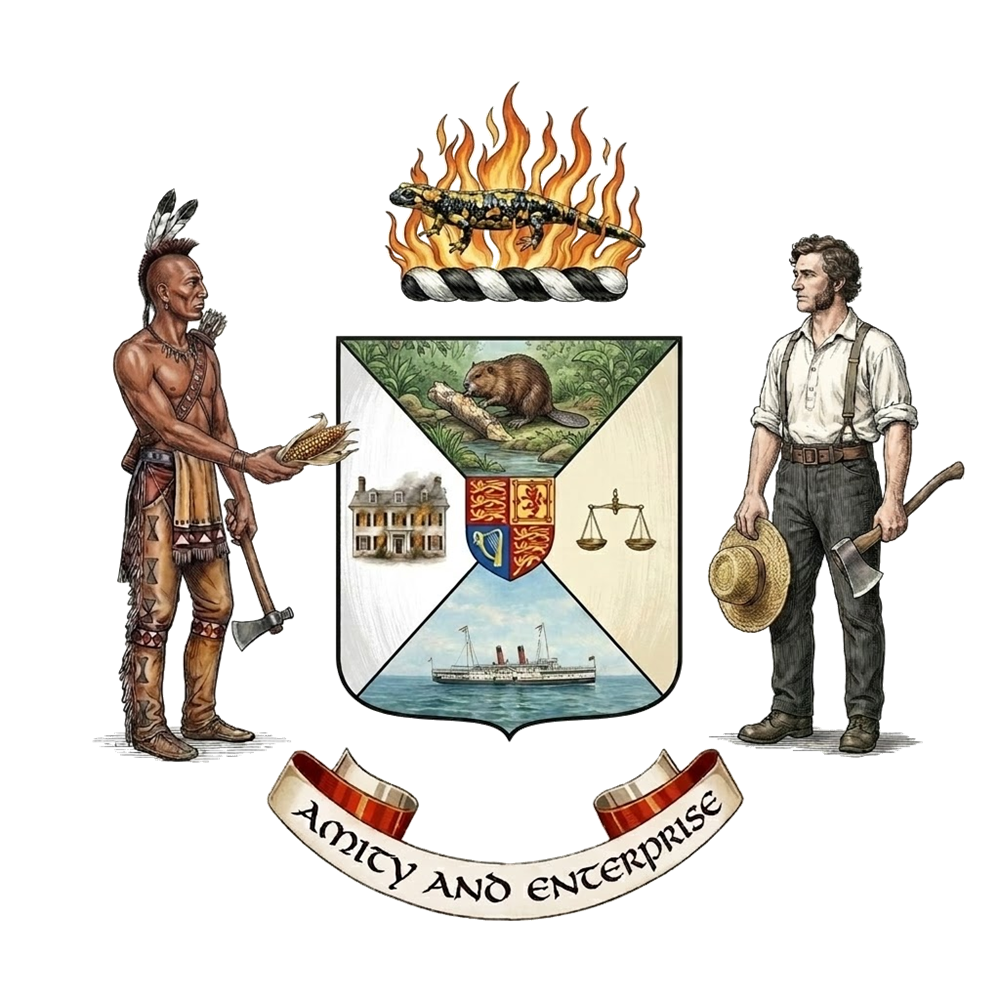
- Industry: Insurance
- Founded: 31 August 1851
- Defunct: 1 January 2025
- Fate: Merged into Intact Insurance
- Headquarters: 88 Scott Street, Toronto, Ontario
- Parent: Royal Insurance (1961–1996); Royal and Sun Alliance (1996–2021); Intact Financial (2021–2025)

The Western Assurance Company was a Canadian insurance company that has operated from 1851 to 2025. Western was one of the country's earliest fire insurance companies and played an important role in the development of the industry in Canada.

== History ==
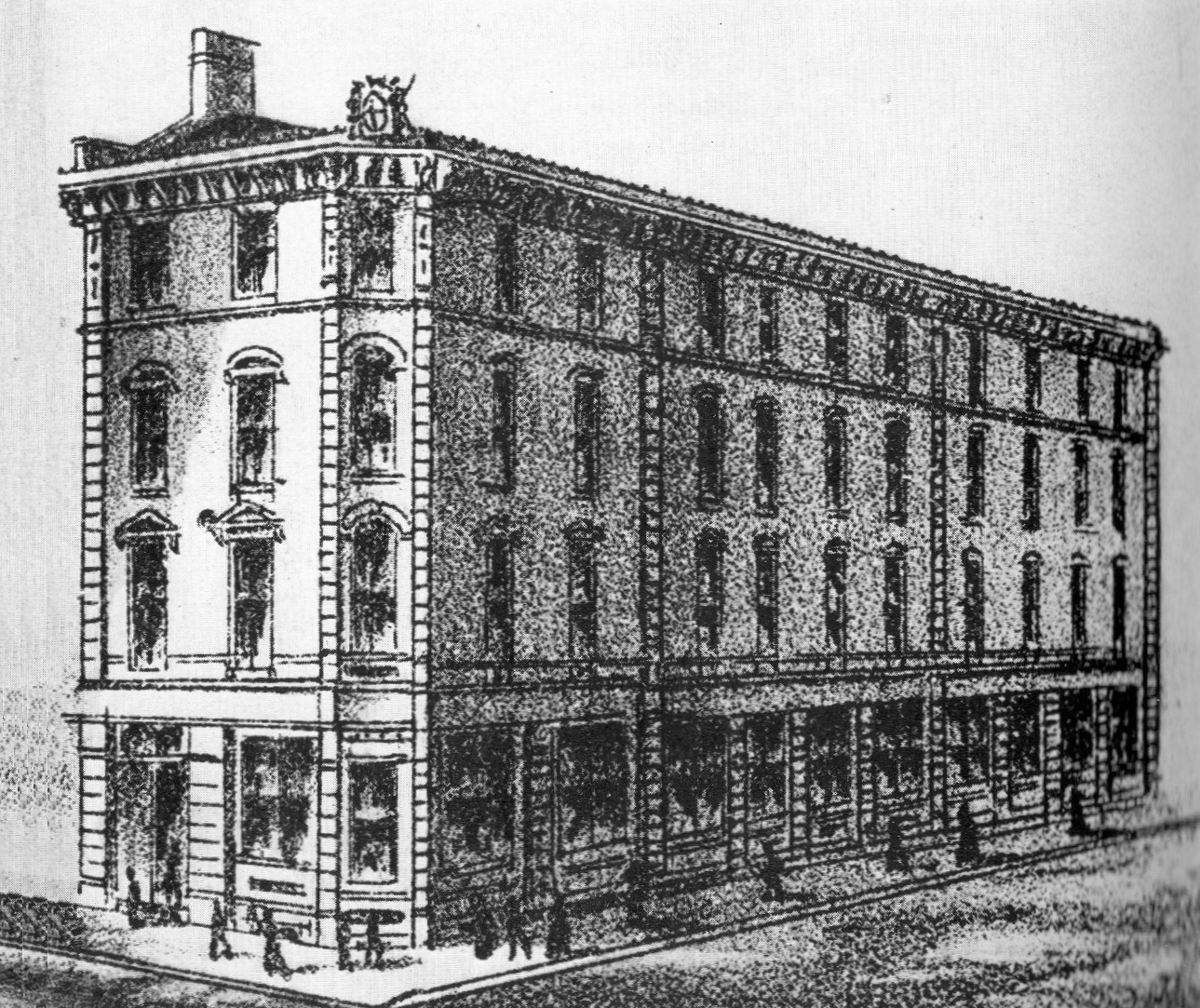
The 1854 headquarters building at 36 Church Street, designed by Kivas Tully.

In 1892, Western formed an alliance with the British America Assurance Company. Under the agreement, the two companies would retain the separate identities but would share a common board of directors. Thereafter, the companies were known as the Western–British America Group.

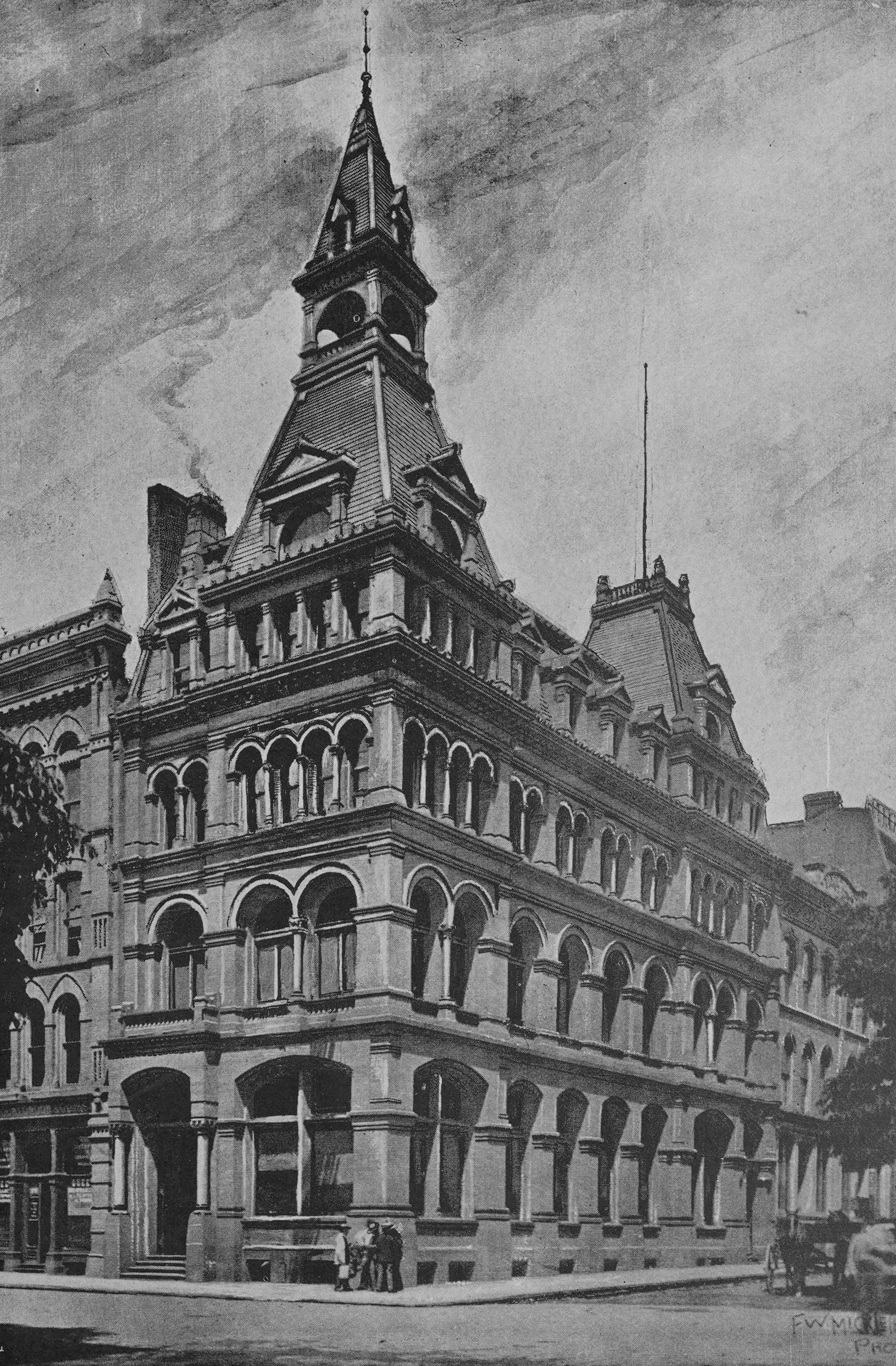
The 1878 headquarters at 22 Wellington East, designed by Richard Alfred Waite.

In 1961, Royal Insurance of London, England acquired the Western–British America Group. Following the acquisition, Western and British America continued to operate separately. In 1976, British America changed its name to the Royal Insurance Company of Canada, and then in 1978, absorbed the operations of its subsidiaries the Hudson's Bay Insurance Company and the Globe Indemnity Company of Canada. After the 1996 merged of Royal Insurance and Sun Alliance to form Royal and Sun Alliance, the Canadian company changed its name to the Royal and Sun Alliance Insurance Company of Canada. In 2008, Royal and Sun Alliance changed its brand name to RSA, at which time Western Assurance began operating as WA.

In 2021, Intact acquired the RSA Insurance Group. On 9 September 2024, Intact petitioned the federal minister of finance to amalgamate Western's operations into intact, effective 1 January 2025.

== Leadership ==
=== President ===
1. Isaac Clarke Gilmor, 1851–1862
2. George Michie, 1862–1865
3. John McMurrich, 1865–1883
4. Alexander Mortimer Smith, 1883–1895
5. George Albertus Cox, 1895–1914
6. William Rees Brock, 1914–1917
7. William Buchanan Meikle, 1917–1923
8. Wilfrid Maynard Cox, 1923–1931
9. Ernest Arthur Brownell, 1931–1947
10. Geoffrey Stubington, 1947–1958
11. Frank John Erwood, 1958–1960
12. Hugh P. Ham, 1960–1966
