= Dominion Bank =

Canadian bank (1869–1955)

The Dominion Bank
- Industry: Banking
- Founded: 22 June 1869
- Defunct: 31 January 1955
- Fate: Merged with the Bank of Toronto
- Successor: Toronto-Dominion Bank
- Headquarters: 1 King Street W, Toronto, Ontario

The Dominion Bank was a Canadian bank that was chartered in 1869 and based in Toronto, Ontario. On February 1, 1955, it merged with the Bank of Toronto to form the Toronto-Dominion Bank.

== History ==
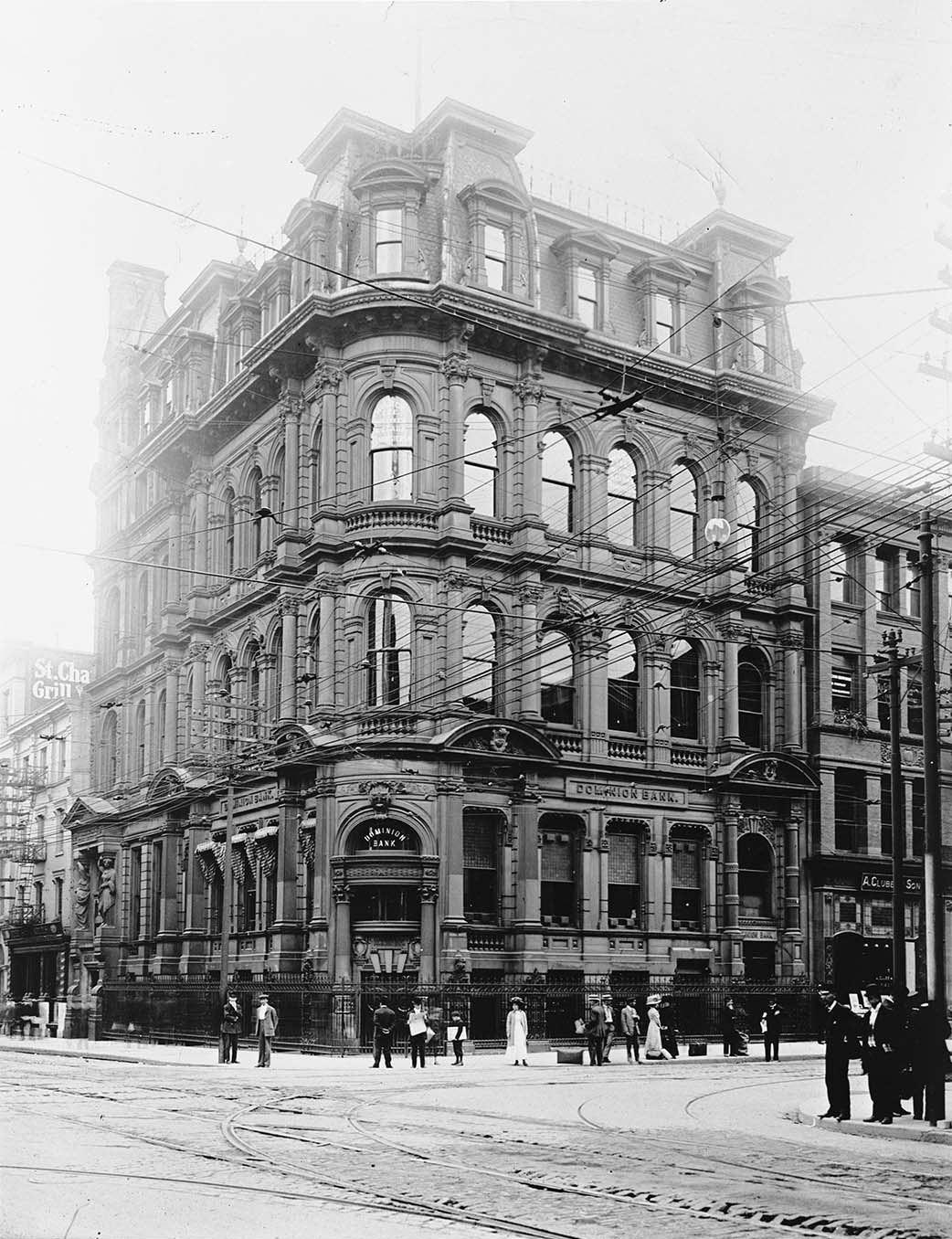
The bank's headquarters in Toronto used from 1879 to 1913, designed by William Irving

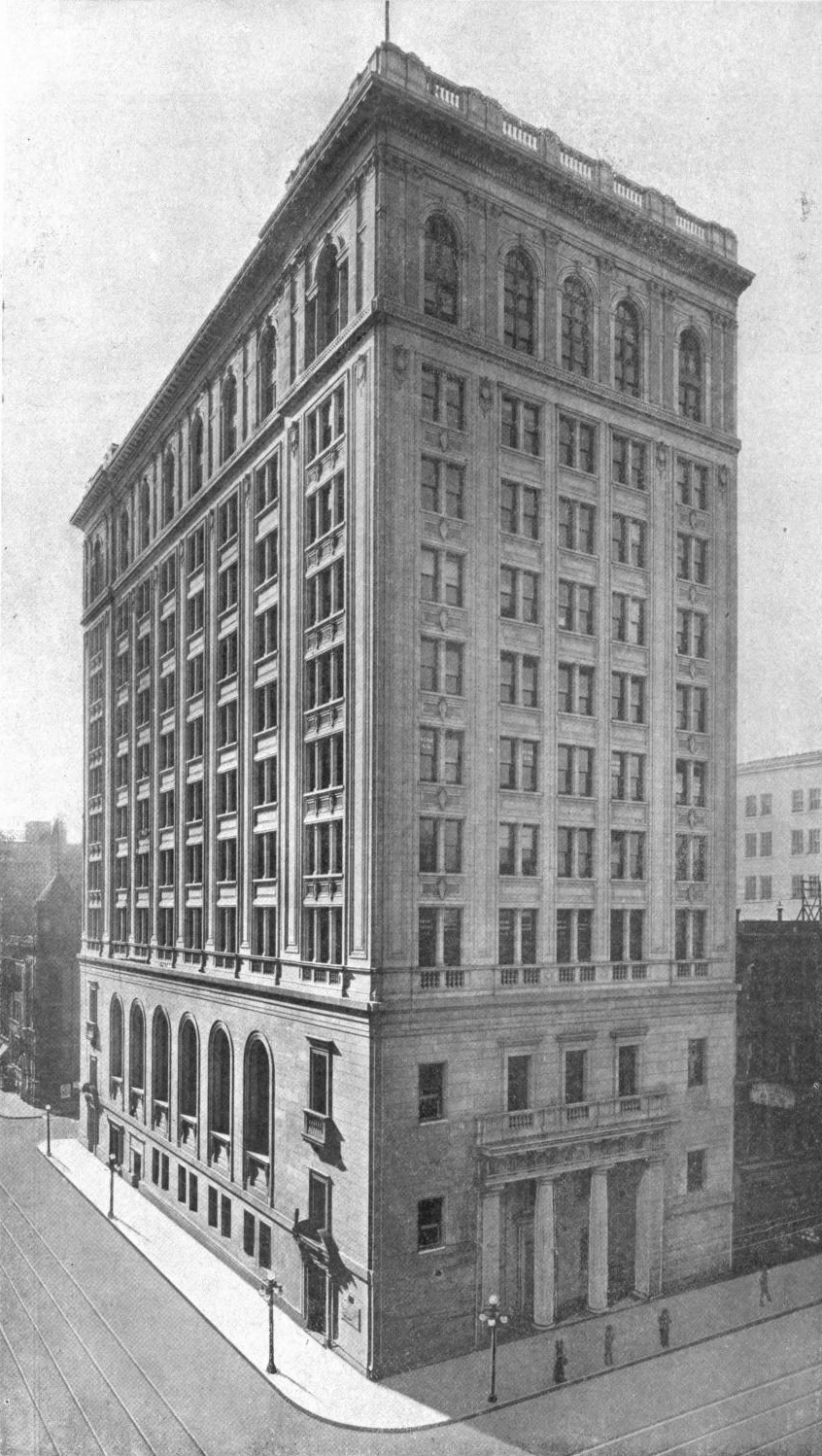
The Dominion Bank Building in Toronto, designed by Darling and Pearson. It served as the bank's headquarters from 1914 to 1955.

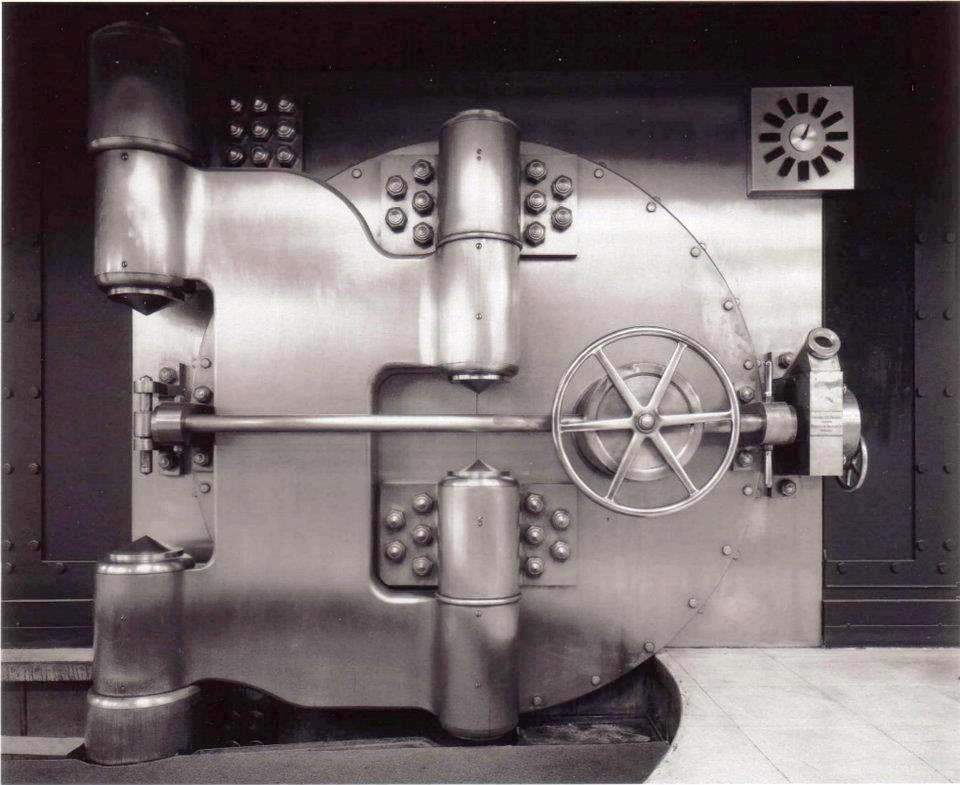
The safe deposit vault with combination viewer was designed by Frederick S. Holmes and built by Remington & Sherman.

The Dominion Bank's charter received royal assent on 22 June 1869. In 1871, the Dominion Bank was launched by entrepreneurs and professionals under the leadership of James Austin with the opening of its first branch on King Street in Toronto, Ontario. They were dedicated to creating a new institution “conducive to the general prosperity of that section of the country.” The Dominion Bank was a cautious institution, “selecting its customers carefully, serving them well, and duly prospering with them” (in the words of the official history). It too created a network of branches, and in 1872 became the first Canadian bank to have two branches in one city – Toronto.

With the maturing of the Canadian economy and the opening of northern Ontario and the West in 1880s and 1890s, the banks became more aggressive in loans to resource industries, utilities, and manufacturing. In 1897, the Dominion Bank opened its first western branch in Winnipeg. In the first decade of the twentieth century, the bank rapidly expanded their branch networks in central Canada and across the west.

To mark its rise as a significant national institution, the Dominion Bank moved to a landmark head office at King and Yonge Street in 1879.

The First World War brought new challenges for the bank when they were called upon to finance war expenditures and to support the innovation of war bonds marketed to the general public. Half the staff of the bank served in the armed forces.

Except for some contraction in the western provinces due to drought, the decade following the war was one of expansion and increasing profitability due to resource development and industrial expansion. Both banks weathered the storm of Great Depression in the 1930s without great difficulty, despite a decline in earnings. Like all Canadian banks, they endured criticism of its credit policies and resisted the introduction of a central bank to control the money supply and advise on fiscal policy. Ultimately the Bank of Canada was established and the banks relinquished their right to issue their own currency.

The coming of the Second World War involved the banks, once again, in the marketing of war bonds and in participation in the control of foreign exchange, rationing, and other financial war measures. Approximately 500 staff, or almost half the total, entered the armed forces.

The Dominion Bank emerged from the war in 1945 stronger than ever, with assets more than doubled since 1939. With the post-war boom, they became more active in business lending and in the penetration of new markets. However, they quickly realized that the costs of expansion and competition with much larger rivals made their objectives difficult to realize. The bank had engaged in acquisitions or mergers in order to grow, but determined that a union with a bank of equal size would place it in a much stronger position to take advantage of the opportunities of the post-war economy.

== Amalgamation ==
In 1954, negotiations began between the Bank of Toronto and the Dominion Bank, and by the end of the year, an amalgamation agreement was reached. In their brief to the Minister of Finance, the banks stated: “It is more burdensome for a small bank to keep pace with the development of our country than for a large bank, with the result that the effective growth and comparative influence of smaller banks will probably in the future decline in comparison with that of the larger banks.”

On November 1, 1954, Canada's minister of finance announced that the amalgamation was accepted, and shareholders were asked for their approval. This was forthcoming in December, and on February 1, 1955, the Bank of Toronto and the Dominion Bank became the Toronto-Dominion Bank.

== Leadership ==
=== President ===
1. James Austin, 1871–1897
2. Sir Frank Smith, 1897–1901
3. Sir Edmund Boyd Osler, 1901–1924
4. Sir Augustus Meredith Nanton, 1924–1925
5. Albert William Austin, 1925–1932
6. Clarence Atkinson Bogert, 1932–1933
7. Clifton Hugh Carlisle, 1933–1948
8. Robert Rae, 1948–1955

=== Chairman of the Board ===
1. Charles Seward Blackwell, 1925–1932
2. Albert William Austin, 1932–1934
3. Clarence Atkinson Bogert, 1934–1947
4. Clifton Hugh Carlisle, 1948–1951

== Architecture ==
Two of the bank's buildings are on the Registry of Historical Places of Canada: the Dominion Bank Building in Winnipeg, Manitoba, built in 1907, and the Dominion (Toronto-Dominion) Bank building in Calgary, Alberta, built in 1911,

John M. Lyle was the architect for the Dominion Bank (and the Bank of Toronto) for many branches in Toronto and throughout Ontario from 1911 to 1939.

== Bank histories ==
- Skelton, Oscar D. Fifty Year of Banking Service, 1871–1921. Brigdens Limited, 1922.

== See also ==
- List of Canadian banks
- One King Street West
- Robert Henry Bethune
