= James Austin (businessman) =

Canadian businessman

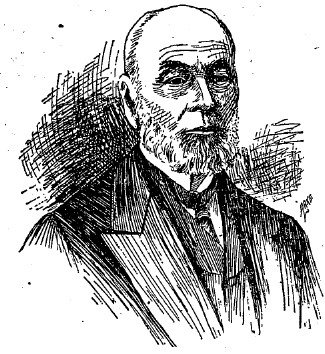
James Austin

James Austin (March 6, 1813 – February 27, 1897) was a nineteenth century Toronto businessman and the owner of Spadina House, now a museum.

== Life and career ==
He was born in Tandragee, County Armagh, Northern Ireland, to a Methodist family. He immigrated to Canada at age sixteen along with his parents and became apprenticed to a printer, William Lyon Mackenzie. While not directly involved, his close association with Mackenzie led Austin to flee to the United States following the Upper Canada Rebellion of 1837.

In 1843, those involved in the rebellion were granted amnesty, and Austin returned to Toronto. Entering business, he joined with Patrick Foy to found the Austin & Foy Wholesale Company in the Daniel Brooke Building at the corner of King and Jarvis streets in Toronto. The wholesale company was successful, but Austin was interested in pursuing other ventures and it was dissolved in 1870, leaving Austin with a fair amount of money.

He then became a central player in the Toronto financial world. In 1871, he founded The Dominion Bank, ancestor of today's Toronto-Dominion Bank. He remained president of that institution until his death, but he was also involved in many others. He became president of the Queen City and the Hand-to-Hand insurance companies, and chairman of the North of Scotland Canadian Mortgage Company. He also was involved in the Consumers' Gas Company, being one of its founding directors. In 1881, he increased his control over Consumers' Gas and became president of that company.

In 1844, he married Susan Bright, and they had five children. His eldest son Charles died at 13, and his second son James (Jim) died of pneumonia at 38. In 1866, he built Spadina House to house his family, which is now a museum.

He retained all of his positions up until his death, despite suffering from deafness late in life. He died after several months of illness at the age of eighty-four. At his death, he had a fortune of some $300,000, which was divided between his son and daughter. His business interests and his home passed on to his surviving son, Albert William Austin.

== Legacy ==
- Austin Terrace, Toronto - formerly a carriage drive for Casa Loma to Bathurst Street.
- Austin Crescent, Toronto - residential street off Austin Terrace
