= Ottawa Hunt and Golf Club =

Private golf and curling club in Ottawa, Ontario

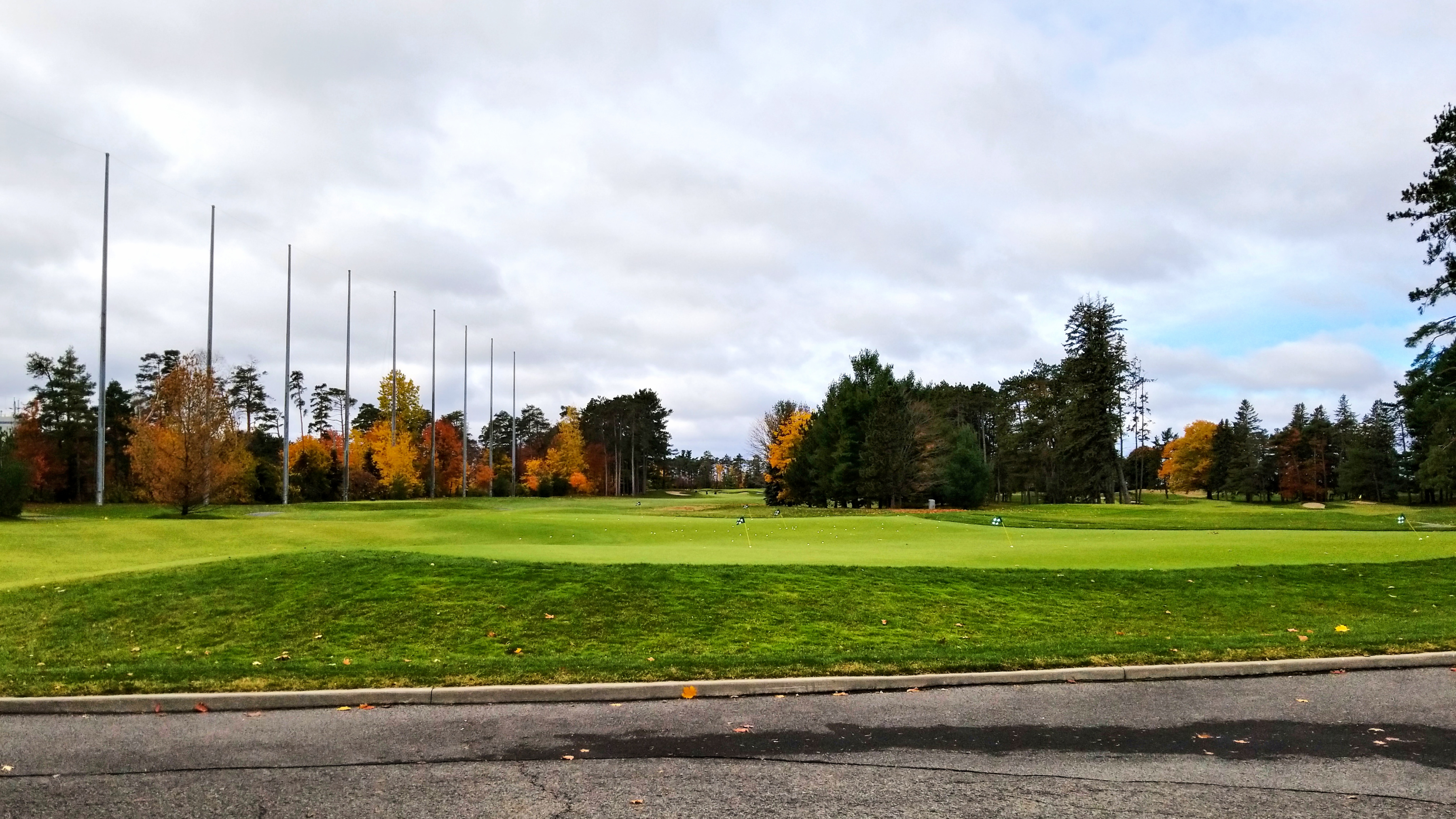

- Location within Southern Ontario
- 45°20′26″N 75°41′05″W

Club information
- Location: 1 Hunt Club Road; Ottawa, Ontario; K1V 1B9
- Established: 1908, 118 years ago
- Type: Private
- Total holes: 27
- Website: ottawahuntclub.org

Gold
- Designed by: Willie Park, Jnr.
- Par: 72
- Length: 6,864 yards (6,276 m)
- Course rating: 73.8
- Slope rating: 136

Red
- Par: 72
- Length: 6,834 yards (6,249 m)

Blue
- Designed by: Willie Park, Jnr. & Tom McBroom
- Par: 72
- Length: 6,808 yards (6,225 m)

Ottawa Hunt and Golf Club
- Interactive map of Ottawa Hunt and Golf Club
- Location: 1 Hunt Club Road; Ottawa, Ontario; K1V 1B9

Information
- Established: 1959, 67 years ago (Curling)
- Club type: Dedicated ice
- Curling Canada region: OCA Zone 2
- Sheets of ice: Six
- Rock colours: Red and Yellow
- Website: ottawahuntclub.org/curling

The Ottawa Hunt and Golf Club, often referred to as Ottawa Hunt or the Hunt Club, is a private golf and curling club in Canada, located in Ottawa, Ontario. Founded 118 years ago in 1908 as a hunting club, it has hosted many world-class professional and amateur golf tournaments, along with many high-profile Canadian curling events.

== History ==
With golf entering into a boom period after World War I, with enormous demand for new facilities, the Ottawa Hunt Club expanded into golf in 1919. Its South and West nines, usually paired together as its main tournament course, were designed by Willie Park, Jnr. (1864−1925), a two-time British Open champion (1887, 1889), one of the era's top golf architects, and a member of the World Golf Hall of Fame.

Its curling facility was opened in 1959, and has six sheets of ice.

Journalist Eddie MacCabe wrote a history book for the 75th anniversary of the club, published in 1983.

== Redesign history ==
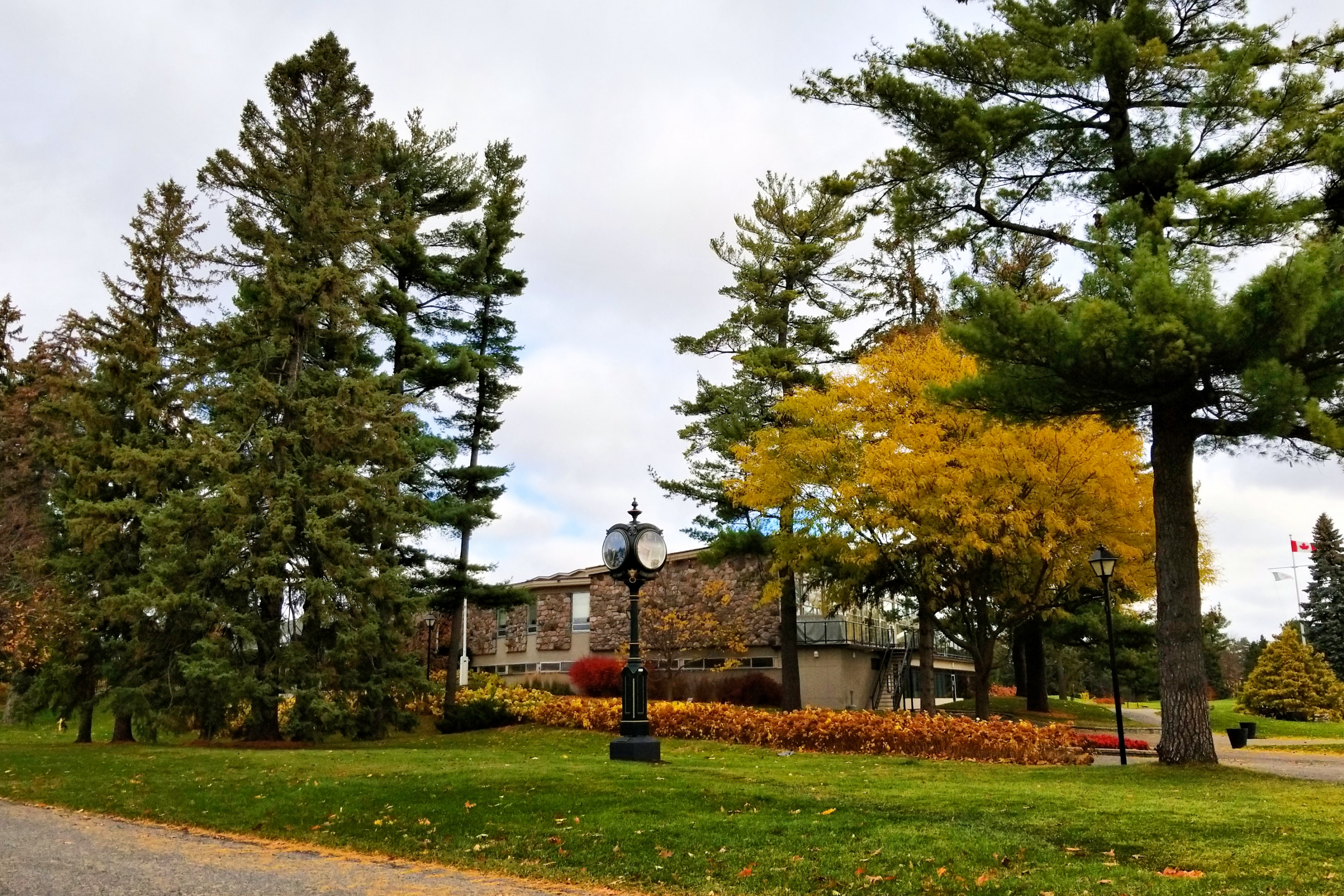
Club house

The golf course was redesigned, mainly for its green complexes, by Tom McBroom in 1989. The club's latest renovation, with a primary aim to implement more expansive practice facilities, was performed by Dr. Michael Hurdzan in 2013; this work reduced the par from 72 to 71, as one par-four hole was replaced by a new par-three hole.

== Important tournaments hosted ==
=== Men's events ===
The Club hosted the Canadian Open in 1932; this tournament was won by World Golf Hall of Famer Harry Cooper.

Ottawa Hunt hosted the Americas Cup golf matches in 1960; this event (which ended after 1967) saw the United States, Canada, and Mexico compete in amateur team play. The American team was led by future World Golf Hall of Fame members Jack Nicklaus and Deane Beman, yet defeated Canada only narrowly, by 21.5 to 20, with Mexico trailing in third place.

It hosted the Canadian Amateur Championship in 1937; this event was won by Canadian Golf Hall of Fame member Ross Somerville, for his last of six titles. It hosted the Canadian Amateur Championship in 1960; this event was won by Canadian Golf Hall of Fame member Keith Alexander. It hosted the Canadian Amateur Championship in 1970; this event was won by Allen Miller, who turned professional shortly afterwards, and went on to win on the PGA Tour.

=== Women's events ===
The club hosted the 1994 du Maurier Classic, then a major championship, on the LPGA Tour, won by Martha Nause with a score of 279 (nine under par) for four rounds.

It hosted the LPGA Tour's CN Canadian Women's Open in August 2008, celebrating the club's centennial. Katherine Hull won with a score of 277 (−11), one stroke ahead of runner-up Se Ri Pak, with Yani Tseng a further stroke back in third place; Tseng set a new ladies' competitive course record with 64 (–8) in round two, spread over two days due to weather. The 2008 edition of the tournament set new attendance records, with more than 70,000 fans, and raised more than C$1 million for charity.

In 2017, the club hosted the CP Canadian Women's Open, which was won by Sung Hyun Park, who had earlier won the 2017 U.S. Women's Open. Canadian superstar Brooke Henderson, who grew up in Smiths Falls, Ontario, less than an hour's drive from Ottawa Hunt, set a ladies' record for the newly redesigned course with a third-round 63, eight under the revised par of 71. Henderson is an honorary member of the Ottawa Hunt Club.

The scoring record would last until the 2022 Canadian Women's Open as Paula Reto would break the course and tournament record shooting a 62 in the opening round. She would go on to win the tournament to mark her 1st LPGA Tour victory.

=== Golf champions at Ottawa Hunt ===
- 1932 Canadian Open, won by Harry Cooper
- 1937 Canadian Amateur, won by Ross Somerville
- 1960 Canadian Amateur, won by Keith Alexander
- 1960 Americas Cup Matches, won by the United States of America
- 1970 Canadian Amateur, won by Allen Miller
- 1994 du Maurier Classic, won by Martha Nause
- 2008 Canadian Women's Open, won by Katherine Hull
- 2017 Canadian Women's Open, won by Sung Hyun Park
- 2022 Canadian Women's Open, won by Paula Reto

=== Canadian Curling Championships Hosted by Ottawa Hunt ===
- 1961 Diamond D Championship
- 1976 Canadian Senior Men's Curling Championships
- 2010 Canadian Senior Curling Championships
- 2014 Canadian Mixed Doubles Curling Trials
- 2015 Canadian Mixed Doubles Curling Trials
- 2015 Travelers Curling Club Championship
- 2021 Canadian Curling Club Championships
- 2025 Canadian Senior Curling Championships

== Coat of Arms ==
Coat of arms of Ottawa Hunt and Golf Club, Limited

Granted
May 15, 2024
Armiger
Ottawa Hunt and Golf Club, Limited
Crest
A red-tailed hawk rising wings addorsed proper holding a golf flag Gules
Escutcheon
Vert two golf clubs in saltire proper their heads and grips Or, in base a curling stone proper its handle Or, on a chief Argent a fox courant Gules
Supporters
Dexter a stallion sinister a mare both saddled and bridled and standing on fields proper
Motto
ENTRAIDE • COLLEGIALITY • RESPECT
Symbolism
The green shield represents its golf course and hunting origins, while the crossed golf clubs, curling stone, and red fox reflect its primary sports and early hunting traditions. The crest features a red-tailed hawk, symbolizing environmental stewardship and the wildlife on its grounds, holding a red golf flagstick, a traditional course marker. Flanking the shield, a stallion and mare honor the club's equestrian hunting heritage, with fields beneath them referencing the 19th-century Groveland farm where the club was founded. The motto, "ENTRAIDE • COLLEGIALITY • RESPECT," emphasizes the club's core values of mutual aid, fellowship, and respect, encapsulating its evolution from a hunting club to a diverse sporting institution committed to community and conservation.
