= The Royal Ottawa Golf Club =

Private golf club in Gatineau, Quebec

Coordinates: 45.4154°N 75.7655°W

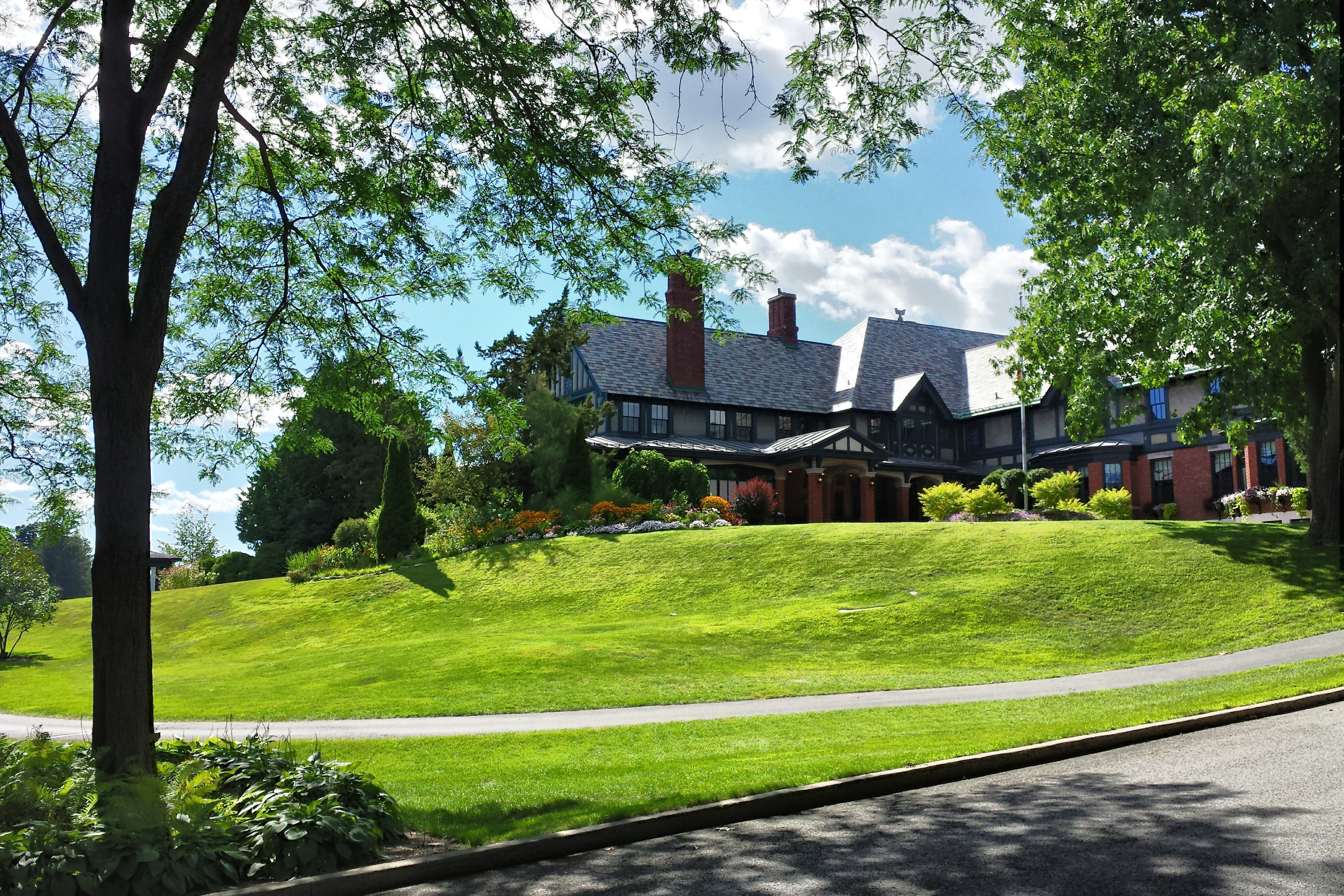
Royal Ottawa Golf Club House

The Royal Ottawa Golf Club is a private golf club located in Gatineau, Quebec, Canada. It was founded in 1891, and has made major contributions to the development of Canadian golf right from its early years, hosting many important championships and meetings, and continues to do so. Several significant champion golfers have been associated with the club. The club has 27 holes of golf.

== Founding, early years ==
The club was founded in 1891, as the Ottawa Golf Club. It was the host of founding meetings of the Royal Canadian Golf Association (in June 1895), and the Canadian Professional Golfers' Association (in July 1911). Since 1895, it has hosted several important amateur and professional championship tournaments (see below for details).

The club's first site, a nine-hole course, was built on land lent by Charles Magee, a real-estate developer, in a section of Ottawa just west of the old Dominion Rifle Range (south of what became Strathcona Park) in what is now known as Sandy Hill. The first Canadian Amateur Championship was played on this course in June 1895.

Soon after that, responding to pressure on prime real estate in the rapidly expanding city core, the club moved to a new site in the province of Quebec, just across the Ottawa River from Ottawa to the north, a mile north of Hull, Quebec, along Chelsea Road, on the property that was one of the founder of Hull, Quebec, Philemon Wright's original farms, the Columbia Farm. The clubhouse occupied the stone house that was built by Thomas Brigham, Philemon's son-in-law. This course consisted of 12 holes, of which six had to be played twice to comprise an 18-hole round. One of the par-three holes was quite unique, in that players had to flight their ball over the barn behind the clubhouse to reach the green.

== Moves to current site ==
In the early 1900s, the club purchased its current site in Aylmer, Quebec (now part of the city of Gatineau). The site had been known as Mrs. McVeity's orchard and coincidentally, it occupied land that was another of Philemon Wright's original farms, the Britannia Farm. Mrs. McVeity, who was nicknamed "Mrs. Slinn", was once vice-president of Slinn's Bakery in Ottawa.

The Ottawa Golf Club built a new course, and constructed a clubhouse, which opened in 1904. Five years later, it burned to the ground. Its replacement was built on the same site, and it burned down in 1930. The present clubhouse was officially opened on September 19, 1931.

In 1912, the club received permission from King George V to use the designation 'Royal'.

The club presently has an 18-hole course and a 9-hole course, known as the Royal Nine. The main course was designed by Tom Bendelow in a parkland style, and among its features are back-to-back par 3s (holes 11 and 12). The course was redesigned a few years later by Scottish architect Willie Park Jr. (twice Open Championship winner, and World Golf Hall of Fame member). The course has been modified in minor ways many times in the years since. Royal Ottawa is affiliated with the Quebec Golf Association and Golf Canada, as well as the Ottawa District Golf Association.

The Club will host the 2027 Canadian Women's Open, in August 2027. This event is a regular stop on the LPGA Tour schedule, and has been held annually since 1973.

== Significant championships hosted ==
The club hosted the first Canadian Amateur Championship in 1895, and has hosted this championship eight more times (in 1899, 1906, 1911, 1914, 1925, 1951, 1991, 2016). Its nine times hosted ties the national record for most times hosted, with the Royal Montreal Golf Club. The club hosted the Canadian Open in 1906 and 1911. It hosted the 2000 CN Canadian Women's Open (known at the time as the duMaurier Championship); this major championship was won by Meg Mallon.

== Champions associated with Royal Ottawa ==
The winner of the first Canadian Open, in 1904, was Jack Oke, one of the club's early professionals. Karl Keffer, Canadian Open champion in 1909 and 1914, served as head professional for many years. Davie Black was a professional at the club in the early 20th century, and a founding member of the CPGA, before moving to Vancouver, B.C. to take a new job, and his son, Ken Black, who learned his golf at Royal Ottawa, won the 1936 Vancouver Jubilee tournament (as an amateur, becoming the first Canadian to win a PGA Tour event) and the 1939 Canadian Amateur Championship. Alexa Stirling Fraser, an American who married Ottawa doctor W.G. Fraser, had been a young golf prodigy and three-time U.S. Women's Amateur champion from Atlanta, Georgia, before settling in Ottawa and joining the club; she won two Canadian Ladies Amateur Championship titles, contended several more times, and won a record nine Royal Ottawa Ladies' Club Championships. Eric Kaufmanis of Ottawa holds the course record, with a round of 9-under-par 62, scored in 1979. Karl Keffer, David Black, Ken Black, and Alexa Stirling Fraser are all members of the Canadian Golf Hall of Fame.

== See also ==
- List of golf clubs granted Royal status
- List of golf courses in Quebec
