= Bell Bay Golf Club =

Golf course in Nova Scotia, Canada

- Interactive map of Bell Bay Golf Club
- 46°06′40″N 60°44′15″W

Club information
- Location: Baddeck, Nova Scotia; Canada
- Established: 1998
- Type: Public
- Tota holes: 18
- Designed by: Tom McBroom
- Par: 72
- Length: 7,037 yards
- Course rating: 74.3
- Slope rating: 136

The Bell Bay Golf Club is a golf course in Baddeck, Nova Scotia, Canada. Designed by architect Tom McBroom, the course opened in 1998 and was named the best new golf course in Canada by Golf Digest. The club has hosted several prestigious events including the 2005 Canadian Amateur Championship, the 2006 Canadian Club Championship and the 2012 Nova Scotia Men's Amateur Golf Championship and most current 2016 Mackenzie Tour. In 2001 the club hosted the Wayne Gretzky and Friends Invitational in which hockey greats Wayne Gretzky, Brett Hull and Joe Sakic teamed up against future Masters champion Mike Weir.
