= Stanley Thompson =

Canadian golf course architect

Stanley Thompson (September 18, 1893 – January 4, 1953) was a Canadian golf course architect, and a high-standard amateur golfer. He was a co-founder of the American Society of Golf Course Architects.

== Early life, family, education, and military service ==
Stanley Thompson was born in Toronto, as the seventh of nine surviving children, of parents James and Jeannie Thompson, who had married in Middlebie, Dumfries and Galloway, Scotland, in 1880, and emigrated to Canada in June 1882. His father worked for the Grand Trunk Railway, which built a large depot in east-end Toronto. Stanley and his four brothers Nicol (1880–1957), Mathew (1885–1955), William J. (1889–1935), and Frank (1897–1959) all developed into excellent golfers, and each made very significant contributions to Canadian golf. All five Thompson brothers got started in golf by caddying at the Toronto Golf Club, then located in the eastern end of the city, and playing that course when given access.

Stanley Thompson studied at Malvern Collegiate Institute from 1908 to 1911, played on its rugby team in 1911, and graduated. He attended the Ontario Agricultural College (now the University of Guelph) for one year, from September 1912 to April 1913.

He served with the Canadian military, the Canadian Expeditionary Force, in Europe during World War I, earning the 1914–15 Star, and was mentioned in a written dispatch on April 9, 1917, at Vimy Ridge. He served as a gunner with the 4th Brigade.

== Early design career ==
During periods of leave from his military service, and after the war ended, Thompson visited and played many of the top courses in the British Isles. Thompson may have worked on golf course design in Canada before enlisting in the armed services. He worked with his brother Nicol, who had already begun to design courses on his own, immediately after the war ended. When he returned to Canada after the war he became a full-time golf course architect, going into business himself by 1923. In the 1920s there was a rapid expansion of golf in North America, and new courses were needed to accommodate the millions of new players, so Thompson and his peers were kept very busy.

Thompson designed courses from 1912 to 1952, mostly in Canada, with a philosophy of preserving the natural lay and flow of the land. He wrote about his design ideas in golf magazines.

Thompson got his design start with George Cumming, longtime professional at the Toronto Golf Club, who had designed several Canadian courses early in the 20th century, after arriving in Canada. The two had known each other since Thompson's boyhood as a caddie at the club.

== Design associates ==
Thompson hired Howard Watson and C.E. (Robbie) Robinson in 1929; after working with Thompson for many years, both Watson and Robinson launched their own independent careers, each contributing to more than 50 courses. Canadian Geoffrey Cornish worked with Thompson, and eventually began his own practice, working mainly in the United States. Thompson became design partners with Robert Trent Jones in 1932; the two worked together for most of the 1930s, as Thompson trained the younger Jones, before Jones began his independent practice in 1940. Thompson also hired Norman H. Woods and Robert Moote while they were young graduates; each became a significant golf course architect.

== Courses in Canadian National Parks ==
Thompson's many world-famous courses include the Banff Springs Hotel Golf Course in Banff, Alberta, the Jasper Park Lodge Golf Course in Jasper, Alberta, the scenic Fundy National Park Golf Course in New Brunswick, the Green Gables Golf Course in Prince Edward Island National Park, Clear Lake Golf Course in Riding Mountain National Park in Manitoba, Waskesiu Golf Course in Prince Albert National Park, Elk Island Golf Course in Elk Island National Park, Waterton Lakes Golf Course in Waterton National Park, and the Highlands Links in Ingonish, Nova Scotia; all eight are publicly accessible and located in Canadian National Parks. Banff Springs and Jasper Park earned him a worldwide reputation.

== Canadian private clubs ==
Private clubs designed or redesigned by Thompson are the Ashburn Golf Club (Old Course) in Halifax, Nova Scotia, Dundas Valley Golf and Curling Club, the Capilano Golf and Country Club in West Vancouver, British Columbia, the Edmonton Country Club and the Royal Mayfair Golf Club in Edmonton, Alberta, Niakwa Country Club in Winnipeg, the Kawartha Golf and Country Club, the Peterborough Golf and Country club, the Oakdale Golf & Country Club (which named one of its three nines after him), Islington Golf Club and the St. George's Golf and Country Club in Toronto, the Westmount Golf and Country Club in Kitchener, Ontario, the Oshawa Golf Club in Oshawa, Ontario, Beach Grove Golf and Country Club near Windsor, Ontario, St. Thomas Golf and Country Club in Union, Ontario, Ladies' Golf Club of Toronto in Thornhill, Ontario, Summit Golf Club in Richmond Hill, Ontario, Muskoka Lakes Golf & Country Club in Port Carling, Ontario, the Cataraqui Golf and Country Club in Kingston, Ontario, Allendale Golf Course in Innisfil, Ontario and Big Bay Point Point Golf & Country Club in Innisfil, Ontario.

== Helps to found ASGCA in 1948 ==
In 1948, Thompson was a co-founder, with Donald Ross and Robert Trent Jones, of the American Society of Golf Course Architects. Thompson served as ASGCA president in 1949. Four of his design associates also later served as ASGCA presidents: Jones, Watson, Robinson, and Cornish.

== Thompson family golf achievements ==
Stanley Thompson was an excellent player himself, competing with success many times in the Canadian Amateur Championship and in other top-class events, winning titles such as the Winter Championship of Florida. His four brothers—Nicol, Frank, Mathew, and William J.—all became outstanding Canadian players in the 1910s and 1920s. Nicol served as the club professional at Hamilton Golf and Country Club for most of his career, and won the Canadian PGA Championship title in 1922. The other four Thompson brothers remained top-class amateurs for most of their lives. Mathew turned professional in his 40s at the Elmhurst Club near Winnipeg, where he had been a member and club champion. Frank won two Canadian Amateur Championship titles, in 1921 and 1924, while also losing the final in 1927. William J. won one Canadian title, in 1923; he also won the Ontario Amateur Championship in 1924 and 1925, while playing a central role in founding and serving as a director with the Ontario Golf Association (now the Golf Association of Ontario). As an outstanding competitive golf family, the Thompsons were somewhat comparable to the higher-profile Turnesa family of the United States, most of whom turned professional at golf, during a slightly later era. Nicol, William, Frank and Mathew each assisted Stanley at various times with his course design work and construction.

== Summary of courses designed ==
The Stanley Thompson Society provides a list of 178 courses which Thompson laid out, had constructed, or remodeled through one of the companies that he worked for or managed in the years 1912–1953. Geographically, the courses are located in:

- Canada (144 courses)
- USA (26 courses)
- Brazil (4 courses)
- Colombia (2 courses)
- Jamaica (2 courses)

== Death and legacy ==
Thompson died of an aneurysm in early 1953, at age 59, in Toronto, just as he was starting travel to South America, where he was to design a golf course.

Thompson was inducted into the Canadian Golf Hall of Fame in 1980. In 2000, golf historian James A. Barclay wrote a biography of Thompson entitled The Toronto Terror. The Stanley Thompson Society was founded in 1998. Thompson was inducted into the Ontario Golf Hall of Fame in its 2000 charter class. In 2008, Thompson was recognized as a Person of National Historic Significance. Thompson was inducted into Canada's Sports Hall of Fame in 2015, in the Builder category.

The Canadian golf magazine SCORE ranks, on a biennial basis, Canada's top courses. For 2016, six Stanley Thompson courses were ranked in the top 13 in the country. These were: Fairmont Jasper Park (#3), St. George's (#5), Highlands Links (#7), Fairmont Banff Springs (#8), Capilano (#10), and Westmount (#13). An additional seven Thompson courses were ranked in the top 100.
