= James A. Barclay =

Amateur golfer, author, historian

James Alexander Barclay (October 29, 1923 – December 3, 2011) was a Scottish Canadian oil industry engineer (Applied Chemistry) and executive, golfer, and golf historian. He was elected to the Canadian Golf Hall of Fame in 2008.

Barclay was born in Glasgow, Scotland. He began golf as a youth, with cut-down hickory-shafted clubs. He graduated from Glasgow University in Applied Chemistry, and spent his career working in the oil industry, eventually reaching the vice-president level.

Barclay moved to Canada in 1968, retired in 1983, and became the curator of the golf museum of the Royal Canadian Golf Association. He became interested in Canadian golf history, and wrote several magazine articles on that subject.

In 1992, Barclay wrote Golf in Canada: A History, a 626-page volume which is the most comprehensive work on the subject published to date. He was a member of St. George's Golf and Country Club in Toronto. In 1997, he wrote Canada's Professional Golfers: The Scottish Invasion 1883–1933. In 2000, he wrote The Toronto Terror, a biographical work on the life and golf achievements of Stanley Thompson, Canada's premier golf course architect.

The importance of Barclay's achievements were recognized by many organizations. In 2006 Barclay was inducted into the Ontario Golf Hall of Fame. In 2008 he was inducted into the Canadian Golf Hall of Fame. In 2010 he received the Dick Grimm Award from the Golf Journalists Association of Canada. In 2011 he was inducted into the St. George's Golf and Country Club Hall of Fame.

On December 3, 2011, Barclay died of natural causes at the age of 88.

== Major works ==
- Barclay, James A. (1992). Golf in Canada: A History. Toronto: McClelland & Stewart. ISBN 978-0-7710-1080-4.
- Barclay, James A. (2000). The Toronto Terror. Sleeping Bear Press. ISBN 978-1-886947-93-1. – biography of Canadian golf course architect Stanley Thompson.
- Barclay, James A. (1997). Canada's Professional Golfers: The Scottish Invasion 1883–1933. Golf Historical Society. ISBN 978-0968326503.
