= Margaret Todd (golfer) =

Canadian golfer (1918–2019)

Personal information
- Full name: Margaret Agnes Todd
- Nationality: Canada
- Born: May 31, 1918 Montreal, Quebec, Canada
- Died: July 15, 2019 (aged 101) Victoria, British Columbia, Canada

Career
- Sport: Golf
- Status: Amateur

Margaret Agnes Todd (née Sutcliffe; May 31, 1918 – July 15, 2019) was a Canadian golfer and an inductee in the Canadian Golf Hall of Fame.

== Early life ==
In 1918, she was born in Montreal, Quebec. Margaret Todd (née Sutcliffe) joined the Uplands Golf Club as a junior in 1936 and a year later became a member of the Victoria Golf Club. In 1939, she won the club championship for the first of 14 times. In 1940, she added her initial Victoria & District title, which she went on to claim 10 times.

== Career ==
After the war and a hiatus to raise her family, Todd was back playing near "scratch" and won three consecutive B.C. Amateur Ladies titles, seven Jasper Totem events (played in Jasper, Alberta), and three Empress competitions. In the 1950s, she qualified for both the Canadian and U.S. championships and gained the first of five selections to Canada's International Golf team playing in Britain, Australia, and Argentina.

In the 1970s, Todd, competing in the senior ladies, twice won titles in the City, Provincial, and Canadian championships. Throughout her career she captained the B.C. Ladies and B.C. Senior Woman's team on 16 occasions. Her administrative accomplishments, since the 1960s, include Victoria and B.C. appointments to the national and international level.

== Personal life ==
In 1937, she married Jack Todd. They had multiple children.

She turned 100 in May 2018 and died in July 2019 at the age of 101 in Victoria, British Columbia.

== Awards and honours ==
- Todd has been honoured as a Life Member of the Victoria Golf Club.
- She was inducted into the BC Sports Hall of Fame during her lifetime.
- Todd was also inducted into the Canadian Golf Hall of Fame during her career.

== Tournament wins ==
- 1947 British Columbia Amateur
- 1948 British Columbia Amateur
- 1949 British Columbia Amateur
- 1975 British Columbia Senior Ladies
- 1976 Canadian Ladies' Senior, British Columbia Senior Ladies
- 1977 Canadian Ladies' Senior
