= George Lyon (golfer) =

Canadian golfer (1858–1938)

George Seymour Lyon
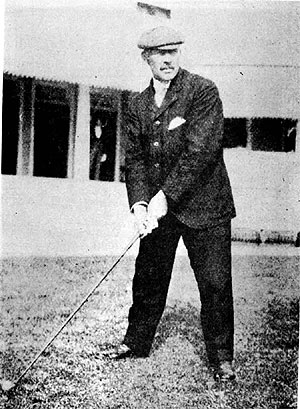
- Lyon in 1904

Personal information
- Full name: George Seymour Lyon
- Nationality: Canadian
- Born: July 27, 1858 Richmond, Canada West
- Died: May 11, 1938 (aged 79) Toronto, Ontario, Canada

Sport
- Sport: Golf
- Club: Lambton Golf and Country Club, Toronto

Achievements and titles
- Olympic finals: Gold medal, St. Louis 1904
- National finals: 8-time Canadian Amateur champion
Medal record
Men's golf
Representing Canada
Olympic Games
Gold medal – first place	1904 St. Louis	Individual

George Seymour Lyon (July 27, 1858 – May 11, 1938) was a Canadian golfer, an Olympic gold medalist in golf, an eight-time Canadian Amateur Championship winner, and a member of Canada's Sports Hall of Fame. He worked in the insurance industry.

== Early life, cricket ==
Lyon was born in Richmond, Canada West, near Ottawa. His early sporting career was in cricket, where, as a batsman he represented Canada eight times, averaging 14.07, and scoring 238 not out in a club game, at that time the highest score ever made in Canada.

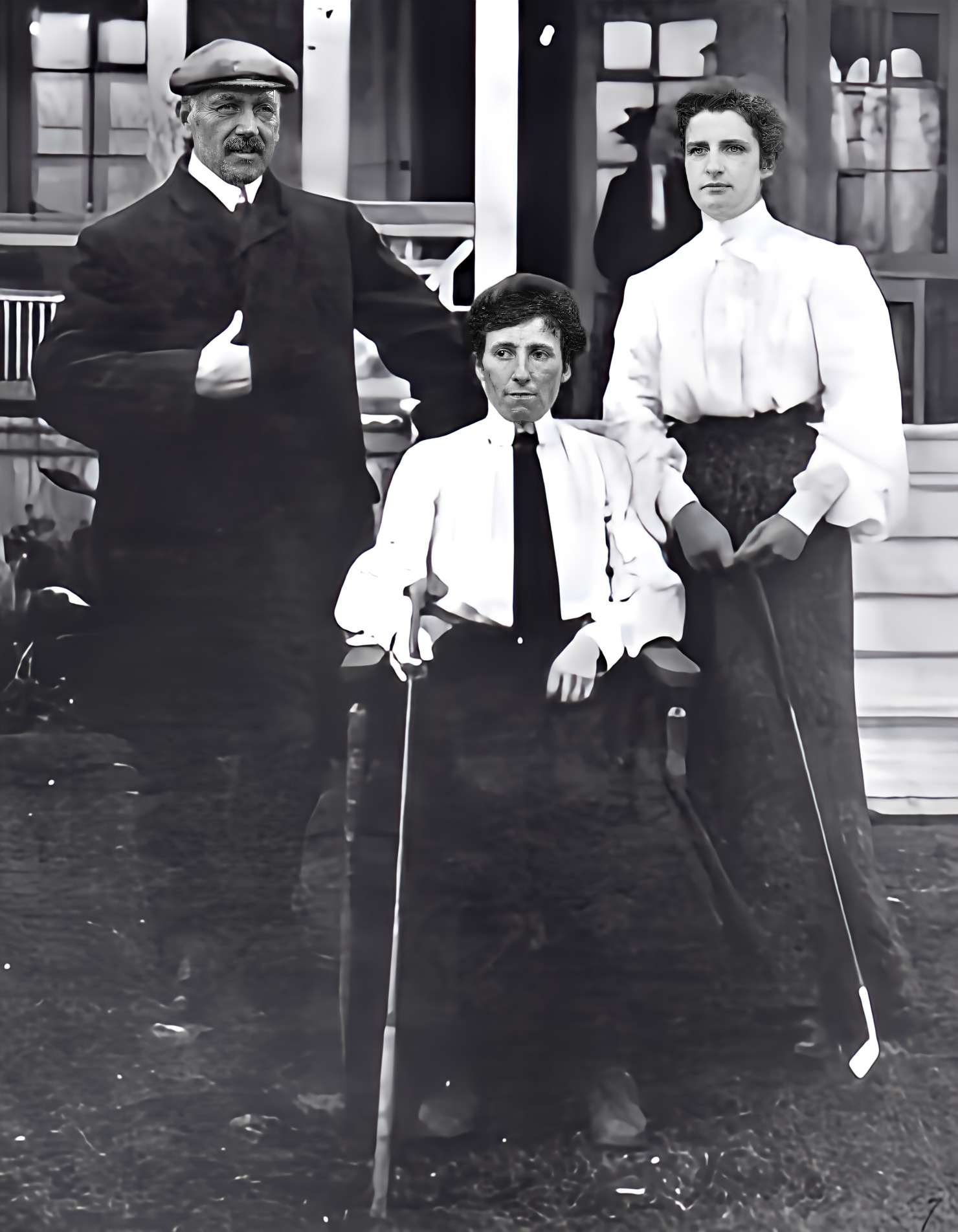
George Lyon, Mabel Thomson, and Florence Harvey, from a 1909 publication.

== Golf career ==
Although he only began playing golf at the age of 38, due to lack of available golf courses in most areas of Canada before that date, he won the gold medal in golf in the 1904 Summer Olympics in St. Louis, Missouri, at age 46, only eight years after beginning the sport. He won the Canadian Amateur Championship a record eight times between 1898 and 1914, the last time in his 56th year. He was also runner-up in that event on two further occasions. He won the Canadian Seniors' Golf Association Championship ten times between 1918 and 1930, the final time in his 72nd year; these events were staged before the inauguration of the Canadian Senior Golf Championship by Golf Canada.

Lyon lost in the finals of the 1906 U.S. Amateur, in his 48th year, and in the round of 32 of the 1908 British Amateur, when in his 50th year. He was a lifelong amateur golfer, never turning professional.

He traveled to London in 1908 to defend his Olympic title, but plans to stage a golf tournament there were cancelled at the last minute, since representatives from England and Scotland were unable to agree on the format. Offered the gold medal by default, Lyon refused to accept it. Golf did not return to the Olympics until 2016.

Lyon was also a founding member, with Albert Austin, of the Lambton Golf and Country Club in Toronto. It was officially opened on June 13, 1903.

Lyon often partnered with the future Canadian golf hall of fame member, professional George Cumming; as a pair they were a difficult team to beat in 4-ball matches.

== Death and legacy ==
Lyon died in Toronto, Ontario, in 1938 and was buried in Toronto's Mount Pleasant Cemetery. In 1955, Lyon was inducted into Canada's Sports Hall of Fame. In 1971, he was inducted into the Canadian Golf Hall of Fame.

The Golf Association of Ontario annually runs the George S. Lyon team championship for its men's club teams.

His life and achievement as an Olympic Gold medalist are described in the 2016 book Olympic Lyon: The Untold Story of the Last Gold Medal for Golf, by Michael G. Cochrane.

== In popular culture ==
A fictionalized version of Lyon, portrayed by Kevin Jubinville, is a supporting character in "A Case of the Yips" (January 25, 2016), episode 11 of season 9 of the Canadian television period drama Murdoch Mysteries. The episode is set in 1903—Lyon mentions his planned upcoming trip to the 1904 Olympics in St. Louis. A running gag through the episode is that as Lyon advises Detective Murdoch about golf, he is also a pushy insurance salesman, trying to talk Murdoch into buying a policy.

== Tournament wins ==
- 1898 Canadian Amateur
- 1900 Canadian Amateur
- 1903 Canadian Amateur
- 1905 Canadian Amateur
- 1906 Canadian Amateur
- 1907 Canadian Amateur
- 1912 Canadian Amateur
- 1914 Canadian Amateur

== Results in major championships ==
Tournament	1905	1906	1907	1908	1909	1910	1911	1912	1913	1914	1915
The Open Championship	CUT										NT
The Amateur Championship	R64			R32							NT
U.S. Amateur	R32	2	R16								R32

Note: Lyon only played in the British Open, U.S. Amateur, and the British Amateur.

Top 10
Did not play

NT = No tournament
CUT = missed the half-way cut
DNQ = Did not qualify for match play portion
R64, R32, R16, QF, SF = Round in which player lost in match play

Sources: U.S. Open and U.S. Amateur, 1905 Open, 1905 Amateur, 1908 Amateur.

== Sources ==
- Cochrane, Michael G. (2023) Olympic Lyon: The Untold Story of the First Gold Medal for Golf (2nd edition), https://michaelcochrane.ca/index.php/project/olympic-lyon-the-untold-story-of-the-last-gold-medal-for-golf/. ISBN 978-1774584002, 177458400X
