= Priddis =

Priddis may refer to:

== Places ==
- Priddis, Alberta, a hamlet in Alberta, Canada
  - Priddis Greens, a community near Priddis, Alberta, Canada

== People with the surname ==
- Anthony Priddis (born 1948), Bishop of Hereford
- Luke Priddis (born 1977), Australian professional rugby league footballer
- Matt Priddis (born 1985), Australian rules footballer
- Roshani Priddis (born 1987), contestant on Australian Idol
