= Doug Roxburgh =

Canadian amateur golfer (born 1951)

Personal information
- Full name: Doug Roxburgh
- Nationality: Canada
- Born: December 28, 1951 (age 74)

Career
- Sport: Golf
- Status: Amateur

Doug Roxburgh (born December 28, 1951) is a Canadian accountant, amateur golfer, and golf administrator. He has won the Canadian Amateur Championship four times, the British Columbia Amateur Championship a record 13 times, and is a member of the Canadian Golf Hall of Fame.

== Early life ==
In 1951, Roxburgh was born in Vancouver, British Columbia. He learned golf as a youth, and was runner-up in the Canadian Junior Championship in 1967 at age 15. He scored his first important success in the 1969 British Columbia Junior Championship, and repeated his win in that event the next year. He also won the first of his 13 British Columbia Amateur Championship in 1969.

== Golf career ==
Roxburgh won the Canadian Junior Championship by six strokes in 1970. He attended the University of Oregon on a golf scholarship for two years, beginning in 1970, studying commerce, but left to complete his degree at Simon Fraser University. He lost a playoff to Dick Siderowf for the Canadian Amateur Championship in 1971, and won the first of his four Canadian Amateur titles in 1972, repeating in 1974, 1982, and 1988. He has represented Canada a dozen times in international play, including seven times in the Eisenhower Trophy.

Roxburgh has maintained his amateur status, and has been a member at the Marine Drive Golf Club in Vancouver since his teenage years. A longtime enthusiastic booster of junior golf, he is now employed by the Royal Canadian Golf Association as an advisor on elite player development.

== Personal life ==
Roxburgh is married to Lorna Roxburgh and has two sons, James and Geordie.

== Awards and honors ==
In 1990, Roxburgh was inducted into the Canadian Golf Hall of Fame.

== Amateur wins ==
note: this list is incomplete

- 1969 British Columbia Junior Championship
- 1969 British Columbia Amateur Championship
- 1970 Canadian Junior Championship
- 1970 British Columbia Junior Championship
- 1972 Canadian Amateur Championship
- 1974 Canadian Amateur Championship
- 1982 Canadian Amateur Championship
- 1988 Canadian Amateur Championship

== Team appearances ==
- Commonwealth Tournament (representing Canada): 1971 (winners), 1975 (winners)
- Eisenhower Trophy (representing Canada): 1972, 1974, 1976, 1978, 1988, 1990, 1992
