= Geoffrey Cornish =

Canadian golf course architect and author (1914–2012)

Geoffrey St John Cornish
- Born: Geoffrey St John Cornish; August 6, 1914; Winnipeg, Manitoba, Canada
- Died: February 10, 2012 (aged 97); Amherst, Massachusetts
- Occupation: Golf course architect
- Writing career
- Notable works: The Golf Course, Golf Course Design, Eighteen Stakes on a Sunday Afternoon, Classic Golf Design
- Notable awards: 1981 GCSAA Distinguished Service Award; 1982 ASGCA Donald Ross Award; 1984 N.G.F. Outstanding Service Award; 1991 Metropolitan New York GCSAA John Reid Lifetime Achievement Award; 1992 Canadian GCSA John Steel Award; 1996 Golf Course Builders Association of America Don Rossi Humanitarian Award; 1996 Silver Medal of the British Institute of Golf Course Architects; 1996 Canadian Golf Hall of Fame

Geoffrey St John Cornish (August 6, 1914 – February 10, 2012) was a golf course architect, author, and a fellow of the American Society of Golf Course Architects. He designed over 200 courses, including 9-hole additions, around the world.

== Early life and education ==
Born in Winnipeg, Manitoba, Cornish received a bachelor's degree from the University of British Columbia and a Master's from the University of Massachusetts, both in agronomy. His interest in golf course architecture was aroused upon graduation in 1935, when he was hired to evaluate soils and find topsoil on the Capilano Golf Club, then under construction in West Vancouver, for Canadian architect Stanley Thompson. Cornish then continued his training for four years with Thompson before becoming Head Greenkeeper at St. Charles Country Club, Winnipeg.

During World War II, Cornish served with the Canadian Army overseas (1941–1945). After the war, he returned to become an associate of Stanley Thompson from 1946–1947. This was followed by a five-year association with pioneer turf grass scientist Lawrence S. Dickinson at the University of Massachusetts Amherst.

== Career ==
During his first years as a designer, Cornish was assisted in artwork and drafting by his wife, the former Carol Burr Gawthrop. He soon established himself as a competent designer, and in 1964 took on a partner, young Penn State graduate William G. Robinson. Robinson moved to the Pacific Northwest in 1977, and established the firm of Cornish and Robinson, Golf Course Designers, Ltd. of Calgary, Alberta. They prepared the publication Golf Course Design: An Introduction, distributed by the National Golf Foundation and used in many GCSAA classes.

In 1967, Cornish became a member of the American Society of Golf Course Architects, along with Pete Dye, Robert Trent Jones, Jr., and Robert Muir Graves. He served as President in 1975. He is an honorary member of the European Institute of Golf Course Architects.

By 1980, Cornish had planned more courses in the New England states than any other architect in history. He had also designed and remodeled layouts in other parts of the United States, in Canada and in Europe. He was the author of numerous articles on course design and turfgrass subjects. In 1981, he received The Golf Course Superintendents Association of America Distinguished Service Award, and in 1982 the Donald Ross Award. In 1996, he was inducted into the Canadian Golf Hall of Fame.

Long a contributor to a Harvard Graduate School of Design class on Golf Course Design and the University of Massachusetts' Stockbridge Winter School for Turf Managers, he has published numerous books on course architecture, including the pioneering and widely read The Golf Course, which he co-authored in 1981 with Ron Whitten, golf architecture editor for Golf Digest magazine. A second edition of this book, by the same authors, was published in 1993, with the title The Architects of Golf.

In the 1980s and 1990s, Cornish and fellow golf architect Robert Muir Graves conducted scores of design seminars across the continent under separate auspices of the Harvard Graduate School of Design, the GCSAA and the PGA.

Cornish, who was the author of numerous books on golf course architecture, wrote with co-author Ronald E. Whitten the book The Architects of Golf wherein they credit Ida Dixon as the first female golf architect in America and perhaps in the world for her 1904 design of the Springhaven Club in Wallingford, Pennsylvania.

Known for traditional golf course designs, Geoffrey Cornish, would simply lay the course out on the land instead of moving millions of yards of dirt. An example of this approach can be experienced at such courses as Bowling Green Golf Course in northern New Jersey; it lends the course both beauty and playability. Taking full advantage of the land and its natural features you enjoy the natural surroundings as well as the golf (and it takes less time to play).

== Death and legacy ==
Cornish died on February 10, 2012, in Amherst, Massachusetts. He is best remembered as a prolific golf course architect of the 20th century.

== Bibliography ==
- The Golf Course (1981), ISBN 0-8317-3943-6, HarperCollins. Ground breaking research materials on the architects of golf around the world. Co-authored with Ron Whitten.
- The Architects of Golf (1993), ISBN 0-06-270082-0, HarperCollins. With Ronald E. Whitten; updated reprint of The Golf Course.
- Golf Course Design with Robert Muir Graves (1998) ISBN 0-471-13784-7, John Wiley and Sons. Standard textbook at college level. First Golf Design textbook to be translated into Chinese.
- Eighteen Stakes on a Sunday Afternoon (2002), ISBN 0-907186-43-2, Grant Books (U.K.)
- Classic Golf Design (2002), ISBN 0-471-41372-0, John Wiley and Sons
- Golf Course Design (2006) ISBN 978-0907186588, An Annotated Bibliography and Highlights of its History, with Dr. Michael Hurdzan, ASGCA. Grant Books (U.K.)

== Awards ==
- 1981 GCSAA Distinguished Service Award
- 1982 ASGCA Donald Ross Award
- 1984 N.G.F. Outstanding Service Award
- 1991 Metropolitan New York GCSAA John Reid Lifetime Achievement Award
- 1992 Canadian GCSA John Steel Award
- 1996 Golf Course Builders Association of America Don Rossi Humanitarian Award
- 1996 Silver Medal of the British Institute of Golf Course Architects
- 1996 Canadian Golf Hall of Fame
- 2004 Distinguished Alumnus Award, University of Massachusetts
- Distinguished Service Award of the US National Golf Foundation

== Education ==
- Doctorate (Honorary) University of Massachusetts Amherst 1987
- Master's degree (Agronomy) University of Massachusetts Amherst 1952
- Bachelor's degree (Soil Science) University of British Columbia 1936
