= Ross Somerville =

Canadian amateur golfer

Personal information
- Full name: Charles Ross Somerville
- Nickname: Sandy
- Nationality: Canada
- Born: May 4, 1903 London, Ontario, Canada
- Died: May 17, 1991 (aged 88)

Career
- Sport: Golf
- College: University of Toronto
- Status: Amateur

Best results in major championships (wins: 1)
- Masters Tournament: T36: 1938
- PGA Championship: DNP
- U.S. Open: CUT: 1929
- The Open Championship: T28: 1933
- U.S. Amateur: Won: 1932
- British Amateur: T3: 1938

Charles Ross "Sandy" Somerville (May 4, 1903 – May 17, 1991) was a Canadian golfer and all-around athlete.

== Career ==
Somerville was born in London, Ontario. He won six Canadian Amateur Championship golf titles between 1926 and 1937, and in 1932 became the first Canadian to win the U.S. Amateur. He was selected by the Canadian Press as Canada's athlete of the year for 1932, and in 1950 was picked as Canada's top golfer of the first half of the 20th century.

While at the University of Toronto, Somerville played for three years for the Varsity Blues football team and Varsity Blues men's ice hockey team (1921–24). He was also one of Canada's leading cricketers earning selection as a member of the Canadian side that toured England in 1922, his score of 92 against the Free Foresters being Canada's highest individual innings of the tour.

Later, Somerville won three Canadian senior golf titles. and served as president of the Royal Canadian Golf Association in 1957.

== Death and legacy ==
In 1991, Somerville died at age 88. The London Hunt Club, Somerville's home course for most of his life, has a room in its clubhouse honouring Somerville's golf achievements. In 2002, London, Ontario posthumously inducted him into its Sports Hall of Fame.

== Awards and honors ==
- In 1955, Somerville was inducted into Canada's Sports Hall of Fame
- In 1971, he was inducted into the Canadian Golf Hall of Fame
- In 1985, Somerville was inducted into Canadian Olympic Hall of Fame
- In 1987, he was inducted into the U of T Sports Hall of Fame

== Tournament wins ==
- 1926 Canadian Amateur
- 1926 Manitoba Amateur
- 1927 Ontario Amateur
- 1928 Ontario Amateur
- 1929 Ontario Amateur
- 1928 Canadian Amateur
- 1930 Canadian Amateur
- 1931 Canadian Amateur
- 1932 **U.S. Amateur**
- 1935 Canadian Amateur
- 1937 Ontario Amateur
- 1937 Canadian Amateur
- 1960 Canadian Senior Championship
- 1961 Canadian Senior Championship
- 1965 Canadian Senior Championship
- 1966 Canadian Senior Championship

Professional and amateur majors shown in bold.

== Major championships ==
=== Amateur wins (1) ===
Year	Championship	Winning score	Runner-up
1932	U.S. Amateur	2 & 1	(United States) Johnny Goodman

=== Results timeline ===
Tournament	1926	1927	1928	1929	1930	1931	1932	1933	1934	1935	1936	1937	1938	1939
Masters Tournament	NYF	NYF	NYF	NYF	NYF	NYF	NYF	NYF	T43				T36	
U.S. Open				CUT										
The Open Championship								T28						
U.S. Amateur	DNQ	DNQ	R16		R32	R16	**1**	QF	R32	R64	R128	R16	R64	QF
The Amateur Championship								R16		R256			SF	

Note: As an amateur, Somerville did play in the PGA Championship.

Win
Top 10
Did not play

NYF = Tournament not yet founded
NT = No tournament
DNQ = Did not qualify for match play portion
R256, R128, R64, R32, R16, QF, SF = Round in which player lost in match play
"T" indicates a tie for a place

Source for U.S. Amateur: USGA Championship Database

Source for 1933 British Open: www.opengolf.com

Source for 1933 British Amateur: The Glasgow Herald, June 23, 1933, pg. 20.

Source for 1934 & 1938 Masters: www.masters.com

Source for 1935 British Amateur: The Glasgow Herald, May 21, 1935, pg. 3.

Source for 1938 British Amateur: The Glasgow Herald, May 28, 1938, pg. 11.
