= Canadian Women's Open =

Professional golf tournament in Canada

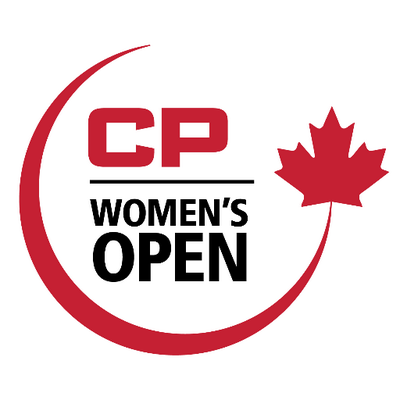
- Location in Canada Location in Alberta

Tournament information
- Location: Canada - varies Edmonton, Alberta (in 2026)
- Established: 1973, 53 years ago
- Course: Royal Mayfair Golf Club (2026)
- Par: 70
- Length: 6,289 yards (5,751 m)
- Tour: LPGA Tour
- Format: Stroke play - 72 holes
- Prize fund: US$2.75 million
- Month played: August

Tournament record score
- Aggregate: 257 Miyū Yamashita (2026)
- To par: −26 Ko Jin-young (2019)

Current champion
- (Japan) Miyū Yamashita

The Canadian Women's Open (French: Omnium féminin du Canada), currently branded as the CPKC Women's Open for sponsorship reasons, is a women's professional golf tournament managed by Golf Canada. It has been Canada's national championship tournament since its founding in 1973, and is an official event on the LPGA Tour.

== History ==
Originally a three-round (54-hole) tournament for its first six years; it has been a four-round (72-hole) tournament since 1978. From 1979 through 2000, the event was one of the LPGA Tour's four major championships. In 2001, due to a loss of sponsorship as a result of Canadian law, its status was stripped, and was replaced by the Women's British Open, an existing event which was already a major on the Ladies European Tour.

In 2007 and 2008, it was the final "winner" event of the LPGA season—i.e., an event in which the winner earns an automatic berth in the LPGA season-ending championship, the LPGA Tour Championship. As of 2009, the LPGA no longer uses this system to determine players who qualify for the Tour Championship. From 2007 to 2009, the CWO was the third richest event on the LPGA Tour, behind only the U.S. Women's Open and the Evian Masters in France. The prize fund was reduced in 2010 and 2012, but the $2.25 million purse remains among the highest on the LPGA Tour.

In 2012, amateur Lydia Ko became the youngest-ever winner of an LPGA Tour event. At 15 years and four months, she surpassed the record set by Lexi Thompson at 16 years and seven months in September 2011. Ko's win also made her only the fifth amateur to have won an LPGA Tour event, and the first in over 43 years. She successfully defended her win as an amateur in 2013, and won her third in 2015 as a professional.

In 2018 Brooke Henderson became the first Canadian in 45 years, and only the second ever after Jocelyne Bourassa won the inaugural event in 1973, to win Canada's national open. Henderson won her second Canadian Women's Open title in 2025.

== Title sponsorship ==
The tournament was first known as La Canadienne, as the event was held in Quebec. In 1974, it was sponsored by Imperial Tobacco Canada, becoming the Peter Jackson Classic until 1984, after which it became the du Maurier Classic; both Peter Jackson and du Maurier are cigarettes within the Imperial Tobacco Canada umbrella.

From 1988, the tournament was renamed the du Maurier Ltd. Classic. The rebranding was due to new tobacco advertising restrictions which came into force that year, which only allowed tobacco companies to sponsor cultural and sporting events under their corporate names, and not their product brands. As a workaround, the sponsorship was officially with du Maurier Ltd.—a special-purpose entity that used du Maurier's trade dress—and not the du Maurier brand itself.

In 2000, the tournament was threatened by new regulations prohibiting any tobacco advertising at sports and cultural events, requiring du Maurier to end its sponsorship. Organizers stated that they were having difficulties finding a sponsor, and could not assure that the event would be held again in 2001. Due to this uncertainty, the LPGA Tour stripped the du Maurier of its major status in favour of the Women's British Open.

In November 2000, it was announced that the Bank of Montréal would become the new sponsor under a five-year deal, renaming it the Bank of Montreal Canadian Women's Open. The bank declined to renew the sponsorship; in 2006, the Canadian National Railway became sponsor, renaming it the CN Canadian Women's Open.

In November 2013, the Canadian Pacific Railway took over title sponsorship of the Canadian Women's Open. Canadian Pacific also increased the purse to US$2.25 million. Canadian Pacific merged with Kansas City Southern Railway in 2023 as Canadian Pacific Kansas City (CPKC); CPKC inherited the sponsorship, and announced an agreement to renew it through at least 2026 with two option years allowing the sponsorship to be extended to 2028. The purse further increased to US$2.5 million.

The 2027 event will be held at the Royal Ottawa Golf Club in August.

- 1973: La Canadienne
- 1974–1983: Peter Jackson Classic
- 1984–1987: du Maurier Classic
- 1988–2000: du Maurier Ltd Classic
- 2001–2002: Bank of Montreal Canadian Women's Open
- 2003–2005: BMO Financial Group Canadian Women's Open
- 2006–2013: CN Canadian Women's Open
- 2014–2017: Canadian Pacific Women's Open
- 2018–2022: CP Women's Open
- 2023–present: CPKC Women's Open

== Winners ==
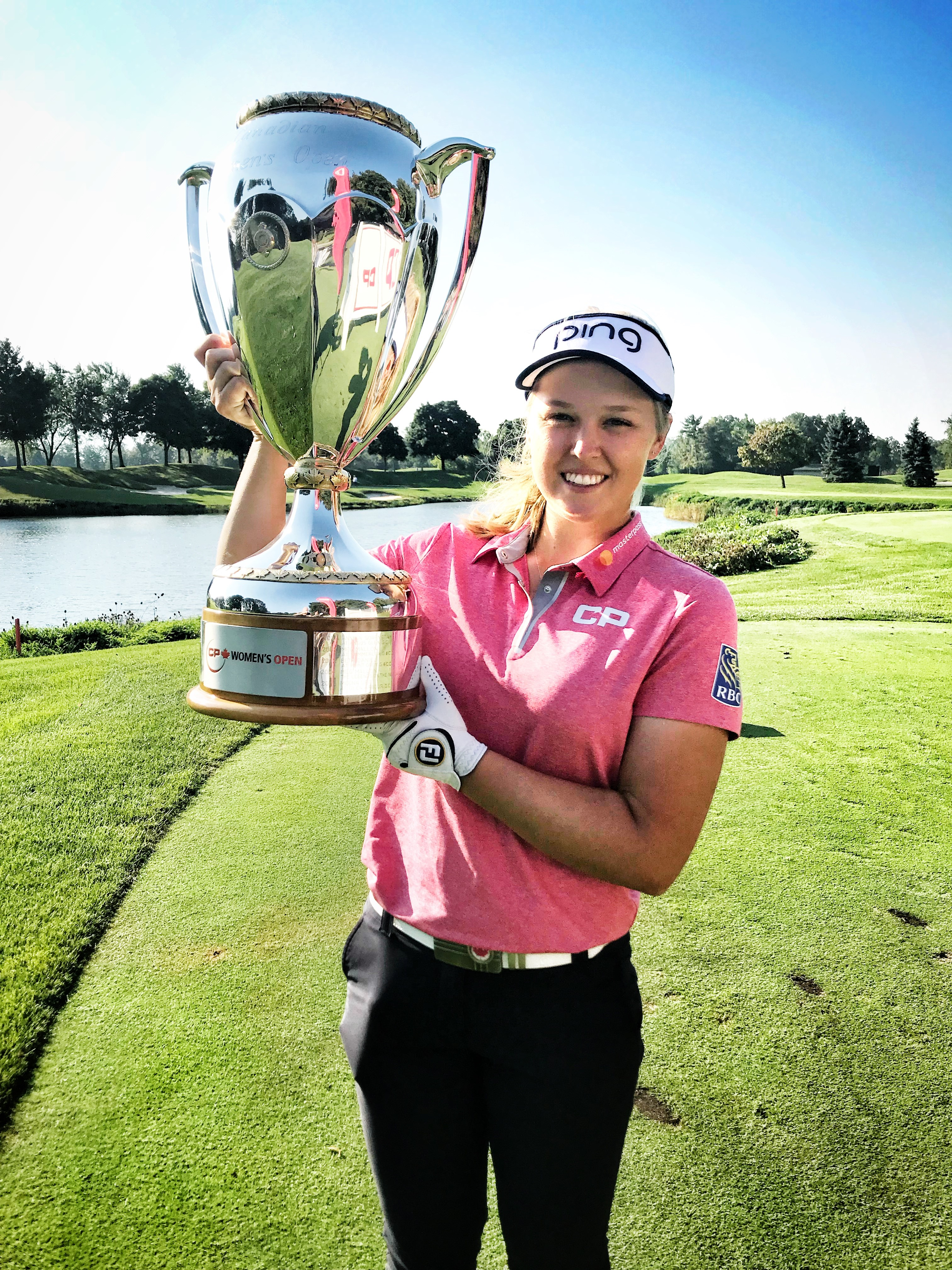
Brooke Henderson holding the trophy after her victory at the 2018 Canadian Women's Open

Winners since 2001; purses are fixed in U.S. dollars.

Year	Date	Champion	Country	Score	To par	Margin of victory	Tournament location	Purse (US$)	Winner's share ($)
2026	Aug 23	Miyū Yamashita	Japan	257	−23	9 strokes	Royal Mayfair Golf Club (Edmonton, AB)	2,750,000	412,500
2025	Aug 24	Brooke Henderson (2)	Canada	269	−15	1 stroke	Mississaugua Golf & Country Club (Mississauga, ON)	2,750,000	412,500
2024	Jul 28	Lauren Coughlin	United States	275	−13	2 strokes	Earl Grey Golf Club (Calgary, AB)	2,600,000	390,000
2023	Aug 27	Megan Khang	United States	279	−9	Playoff	Shaughnessy Golf & Country Club (Vancouver, BC)	2,500,000	375,000
2022	Aug 28	Paula Reto	South Africa	265	−19	1 stroke	Ottawa Hunt and Golf Club (Ottawa, ON)	2,350,000	352,500
2020, 2021: Canceled due to COVID-19 pandemic
2019	Aug 25	Ko Jin-young	South Korea	262	−26	5 strokes	Magna Golf Club (Aurora, ON)	2,250,000	337,500
2018	Aug 26	Brooke Henderson	Canada	267	−21	4 strokes	Wascana Country Club (Regina, SK)	2,250,000	337,500
2017	Aug 27	Park Sung-hyun	South Korea	271	−13	2 strokes	Ottawa Hunt and Golf Club (Ottawa, ON)	2,250,000	337,500
2016	Aug 28	Ariya Jutanugarn	Thailand	265	−23	4 strokes	Priddis Greens Golf & Country Club (Calgary, AB)	2,250,000	337,500
2015	Aug 23	Lydia Ko (3)	New Zealand	276	−12	Playoff	Vancouver Golf Club, (Coquitlam, BC)	2,250,000	337,500
2014	Aug 24	Ryu So-yeon	South Korea	265	−23	2 strokes	London Hunt and Country Club (London, ON)	2,250,000	337,500
2013	Aug 25	Lydia Ko (a) (2)	New Zealand	265	−15	5 strokes	Royal Mayfair Golf Club, (Edmonton, AB)	2,000,000	300,000^
2012	Aug 26	Lydia Ko (a)	New Zealand	275	−13	3 strokes	Vancouver Golf Club, (Coquitlam, BC)	2,000,000	300,000^
2011	Aug 28	Brittany Lincicome	United States	275	−13	1 stroke	Hillsdale Golf & Country Club, (Mirabel, QC)	2,250,000	337,500
2010	Aug 29	Michelle Wie	United States	276	−12	3 strokes	St. Charles Country Club, (Winnipeg, MB)	2,250,000	337,500
2009	Sep 6	Suzann Pettersen	Norway	269	−15	5 strokes	Priddis Greens Golf & Country Club (Calgary, AB)	2,750,000	412,500
2008	Aug 17	Katherine Hull	Australia	277	−11	1 stroke	Ottawa Hunt and Golf Club (Ottawa, ON)	2,250,000	337,500
2007	Aug 19	Lorena Ochoa	Mexico	268	−16	3 strokes	Royal Mayfair Golf Club (Edmonton, AB)	2,250,000	337,500
2006	Aug 13	Cristie Kerr	United States	276	−12	1 stroke	London Hunt and Country Club (London, ON)	1,700,000	255,000
2005	Jul 17	Meena Lee	South Korea	279	−9	1 stroke	Glen Arbour Golf Course (Halifax, NS)	1,300,000	195,000
2004	Jul 11	Meg Mallon (3)	United States	270	−18	4 strokes	Legends on the Niagara (Niagara Falls, ON)	1,300,000	195,000
2003	Jul 13	Beth Daniel	United States	276	−13	1 stroke	Point Grey Golf & Country Club (Vancouver, BC)	1,300,000	195,000
2002	Aug 18	Meg Mallon (2)	United States	284	−4	3 strokes	Summerlea Golf and Country Club (Montreal, QC)	1,200,000	180,000
2001	Aug 19	Annika Sörenstam	Sweden	272	−16	2 strokes	Angus Glen Golf Club (Markham, ON)	1,200,000	180,000

^ Since Ko was an amateur, runners-up Inbee Park in 2012 and Karine Icher in 2013 won the $300,000 winner's share.
Note: Green highlight indicates scoring records.

Winners when the event was a major, from 1979 to 2000

Year	Champion	Country	Score	To par	Tournament location
2000	Meg Mallon	United States	282	−6	Royal Ottawa Golf Club (Gatineau, QC)
1999	Karrie Webb	Australia	277	−11	Priddis Greens Golf & Country Club (Calgary, AB)
1998	Brandie Burton (2)	United States	270	−18	Essex Golf & Country Club (Windsor, ON)
1997	Colleen Walker	United States	278	−14	Glen Abbey Golf Course (Oakville, ON)
1996	Laura Davies	England	277	−11	Edmonton Country Club (Edmonton, AB)
1995	Jenny Lidback	Peru; Sweden	280	−8	Beaconsfield Golf Club (Beaconsfield, QC)
1994	Martha Nause	United States	279	−9	Ottawa Hunt and Golf Club (Ottawa, ON)
1993	Brandie Burton	United States	277	−11^{PO}	London Hunt Club (London, ON)
1992	Sherri Steinhauer	United States	277	−11	St. Charles Country Club (Winnipeg, MB)
1991	Nancy Scranton	United States	279	−9	Vancouver Golf Club (Coquitlam, BC)
1990	Cathy Johnston	United States	276	−16	Westmount Golf and Country Club (Kitchener, ON)
1989	Tammie Green	United States	279	−9	Beaconsfield Golf Club (Beaconsfield, QC)
1988	Sally Little	United States	279	−9	Vancouver Golf Club (Coquitlam, BC)
1987	Jody Rosenthal	United States	272	−16	Islesmere Golf Club (Laval, QC)
1986	Pat Bradley (3)	United States	276	−12^{PO}	Board of Trade Country Club (Woodbridge, ON)
1985	Pat Bradley (2)	United States	278	−10	Beaconsfield Golf Club (Beaconsfield, QC)
1984	Juli Inkster	United States	279	−9	St. George's Golf and Country Club (Toronto, ON)
1983	Hollis Stacy	United States	277	−11	Beaconsfield Golf Club (Beaconsfield, QC)
1982	Sandra Haynie	United States	280	−8	St. George's Golf and Country Club (Toronto, ON)
1981	Jan Stephenson	Australia	278	−10	Summerlea Golf & Country Club (Vaudreuil-Dorion, QC)
1980	Pat Bradley	United States	277	−15	St. George's Golf and Country Club (Toronto, ON)
1979	Amy Alcott	United States	285	−7	Richelieu Valley Golf Club (Sainte-Julie, QC)

Winners before the event became a major in 1979

Year	Champion	Country	Score	To par	Tournament location
1978	JoAnne Carner (2)	United States	278	−14	St. George's Golf and Country Club
1977	Judy Rankin	United States	212	−4	Lachute Golf Club
1976	Donna Caponi	United States	212	−4^{PO}	Cedar Brae Golf & Country Club
1975	JoAnne Carner	United States	214	−5^{PO}	St. George's Golf and Country Club
1974	Carole Jo Skala	United States	208	−11	Candiac Golf Club
1973	Jocelyne Bourassa	Canada	214	−5^{PO}	Montreal Municipal Golf Club

== Multiple champions ==
Multiple winners as a major championship (1979–2000)

Grand Slam winners ‡

Champion	Country	Total	Years
Pat Bradley ‡	United States	3	1980, 1985, 1986
Brandie Burton	United States	2	1993, 1998

Multiple winners of the event since 1973

Champion	Country	Total	Years
Pat Bradley	United States	3	1980, 1985, 1986
Meg Mallon	United States	3	2000, 2002, 2004
Lydia Ko	New Zealand	3	2012^{(a)}, 2013^{(a)}, 2015
JoAnne Carner	United States	2	1975, 1978
Brandie Burton	United States	2	1993, 1998
Brooke Henderson	Canada	2	2018, 2025

^{(a)} - denotes won tournaments as an amateur.

== Champions by nationality ==
Nationality	Wins as major	Overall wins
United States	18	31
Australia	2	3
Peru^{1}	1	1
Sweden^{1}	1	2
England	1	1
South Africa	0	1
New Zealand	0	3
South Korea	0	3
Canada	0	3
Mexico	0	1
Norway	0	1
Thailand	0	1

^{1} - 1995 du Maurier winner Jenny Lidback had dual citizenship (Peru and Sweden) at the time of her win.

== Future sites ==
- 2027 – Royal Ottawa Golf Club
