= Richard Scott (golfer) =

Canadian golfer (born 1983)

Richard Scott (born October 2, 1983) is a Canadian professional golfer. In 2025, Scott was inducted into the Canadian Golf Hall of Fame

== Early life and amateur career ==
Scott was born in Kingsville, Ontario. He learned golf as a youth at the Kingsville Golf Club, southeast of Windsor, Ontario, near Lake Erie. He won the Canadian Amateur Championship in 2003, 2005, and 2006.

In 2005, he was a member of the NCAA championship team from the University of Georgia with Chris Kirk, Kevin Kisner, and Brendon Todd. Shortly thereafter, he graduated.

== Professional career ==
In the fall of 2006, Scott began playing on the Canadian Professional Golf Tour. He has won two tournaments.

== Amateur wins ==
- 2000 Ontario Junior Boys Championship
- 2003 Canadian Amateur Championship
- 2005 Canadian Amateur Championship
- 2006 Canadian Amateur Championship

== Professional wins (2) ==
=== eGolf Professional Tour wins (2) ===
No.	Date	Tournament	Winning score	Margin of victory	Runner-up
1	Oct 19, 2007	The Championship At Walnut Creek	−14 (63-70-69=202)	1 stroke	(United States) Jeff Curl
2	Apr 10, 2010	The Championship at St. James Plantation	−8 (71-69-70-70=280)	1 stroke	(United States) Brian Harman

== Team appearances ==
Amateur

- Eisenhower Trophy (representing Canada): 2004, 2006
