= Highlands Links =

Golf course in Nova Scotia, Canada

Coordinates: 46.6568°N 60.3916°W

Cape Breton Highlands Links golf course is a public golf course located near the village of Ingonish Beach in Nova Scotia, Canada. Highlands Links is located in Cape Breton Highlands National Park, and is owned by Parks Canada and operated by Golf North.

== History ==
Highlands Links was designed by Stanley Thompson, who was contracted by the National Park Service to facilitate a make-work project during the Great Depression. The course initially comprised nine holes but was extended to 18. Construction began in 1939, and the course opened in 1941.

Over the years, Highland Links has subtly changed due to course layout adjustments, the addition of golf cart paths, and vegetation growth. In 2008, restoration specialist Ian Andrew was hired to produce a master plan for recreating Thompson's original design spirit, using archive materials and aerial photos. Restoration of the 57 sand bunkers began in spring 2011 following major storm damage.

== Design ==
Cape Breton Highlands Links is an 18-hole, par 72 course with slope ratings around 120-140.

== Ranking ==
- In 2002, Scoregolf rated Highlands Links the best golf course in all of Canada.
- In 2003, Golf Digest rated the Highlands Links the 64th best golf course in the world.
- In 2007, Golf Magazine rated the Highlands Links the 38th best golf course in the world.
- In 2013, Links Magazine rated Highlands Links 66th best golf course in the world.
- In 2013, Golf Digest rated the Highlands Links 7th best golf course in Canada.

== See also ==
- List of golf courses in Nova Scotia
