= Niakwa Country Club =

Golf course in Manitoba

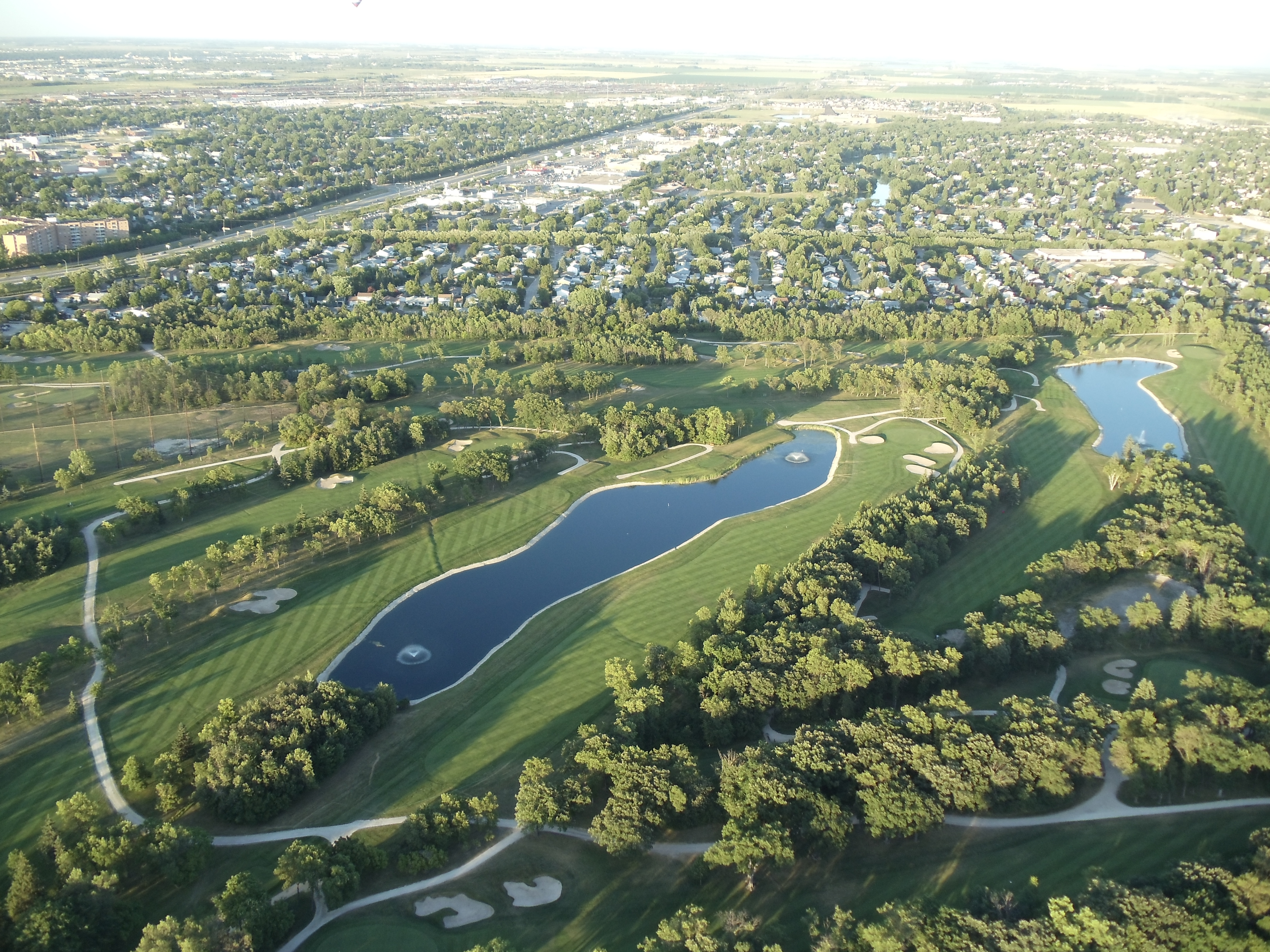
- Aerial view of Niakwa Country Club
- Interactive map of Niakwa Country Club
- 49.852°N 97.092°W

Club information
- Location: 620 Niakwa Road; Winnipeg, Manitoba; Canada
- Established: 1923
- Type: Private
- Total holes: 18
- Website: www.niakwacountryclub.ca
- Designed by: Stanley Thompson
- Par: 72
- Course record: 60 (Aaron Cockerill)

Niakwa Country Club is a country club and golf course in Winnipeg, Manitoba, Canada. The 18-hole, par 72 golf course was designed in 1923 by Stanley Thompson, one of the most internationally recognised Canadian golf course architects.

Niakwa has hosted several major national tournaments, including the Canadian Open in 1961; the Canadian PGA Championship in 1946, 1952 and 1960; the RCGA Men's Amateur Championship in 1974 and 2011; and the Canadian Ladies' Amateur Championship in 1956, 1972, and 2001. The club has also hosted the Canadian Tour's Manitoba Open on several occasions and the Winnipeg Open, a PGA Tour event, in 1946 which was won by Ben Hogan.

Niakwa has also hosted Golf Manitoba and Golf Canada championships including the Canadian Men’s Senior Championship. The course record is 60.

== Scorecard ==
Niakwa Country Club scorecard
| Tee | Rating/Slope | 1 | 2 | 3 | 4 | 5 | 6 | 7 | 8 | 9 | Out | 10 | 11 | 12 | 13 | 14 | 15 | 16 | 17 | 18 | In | Total |
| Par | | 4 | 3 | 4 | 4 | 3 | 5 | 4 | 5 | 3 | 35 | 5 | 5 | 3 | 4 | 3 | 4 | 5 | 4 | 4 | 37 | 72 |
| SI | Men's Handicap | 7 | 17 | 3 | 9 | 15 | 1 | 13 | 5 | 11 | ! | 2 | 10 | 18 | 6 | 16 | 12 | 4 | 14 | 8 | ! |
| Gold | 72.3 / 131 | 310 | 166 | 457 | 440 | 170 | 521 | 374 | 562 | 220 | 3220 | 545 | 542 | 187 | 380 | 135 | 347 | 519 | 332 | 456 | 3443 | !6663 |
| Blue | M: 70.3 / 123 W: 76.0 / 136 | 290 | 150 | 434 | 412 | 162 | 498 | 355 | 530 | 190 | 3021 | 520 | 480 | 170 | 367 | 127 | 330 | 485 | 320 | 425 | 3224 | !6245 |
| White | M: 69.0 / 122 W: 74.3 / 131 | 277 | 143 | 371 | 385 | 135 | 470 | 343 | 505 | 180 | 2809 | 469 | 465 | 165 | 349 | 117 | 320 | 466 | 310 | 359 | 3020 | !5829 |
| Green | M: 66.1 / 116 W: 71.1 / 124 | 248 | 130 | 318 | 333 | 125 | 425 | 302 | 450 | 170 | 2501 | 432 | 435 | 160 | 342 | 107 | 310 | 428 | 300 | 325 | 2839 | !5340 |
| SI | Women's Handicap | 5 | 15 | 7 | 13 | 17 | 3 | 9 | 1 | 11 | ! | 2 | 6 | 16 | 4 | 18 | 14 | 8 | 12 | 10 | ! |

== See also ==
- List of golf courses in Manitoba
