= Cam Burke =

Canadian amateur golfer

Personal information
- Full name: Cam Burke
- Nationality: Canada
- Born: April 30, 1987 (age 39) Kitchener, Ontario, Canada
- Height: 6 ft 1 in (1.85 m)

Career
- Sport: Golf
- College: Eastern Michigan University
- Status: Professional
- Former tours: Web.com Tour eGolf Professional Tour
- Professional wins: 1

Cam Burke (born April 30, 1987) is a Canadian amateur golfer.

== Early life and amateur career ==
Burke was born in Kitchener, Ontario. He attended Eastern Michigan University. He won the 2008 and 2009 Canadian Amateur Championship.

== Professional career ==
Burke played on the Web.com Tour in 2014 after earning his tour card through qualifying school.

== Amateur wins ==
- 2008 Canadian Amateur Championship
- 2009 Canadian Amateur Championship
- 2024 Ontario Mid Am Championship, Canadian Mid Am Championship
- 2025 Ontario Mid Am Championship

== Professional wins (1) ==
=== eGolf Professional Tour wins (1) ===
No.	Date	Tournament	Winning score	Margin of victory	Runner-up
1	Apr 4, 2013	Founders Club Classic	−2 (69-69-76=214)	1 stroke	(United States) Harold Varner III

== Team appearances ==
Amateur

- Eisenhower Trophy (representing Canada): 2010
