= The Links at Crowbush Cove =

Golf course in Morell PEI, Canada

- Location within Prince Edward Island
- 46°25′52″N 62°47′49″W

Club information
- Location: Morell, Prince Edward Island
- Established: 1993
- Type: Public
- Owner: Province of Prince Edward Island
- Tota holes: 18
- Website: https://peisfinestgolf.com/crowbush/
- Designed by: Tom McBroom
- Par: 72
- Length: 6925 yards
- Course rating: 73.7
- Slope rating: 136

The Links at Crowbush Cove is a championship-length golf course located in Morell, Prince Edward Island. The course was opened in 1993 and has been rated in the Top 2 Best Value Golf Courses in Canada by SCORE Golf Magazine. The course was designed by Canadian architect Tom McBroom. The Links at Crowbush Cove hosted the 1998 Export "A" Skins Game featuring professional golfers Mark O'Meara, Fred Couples, John Daly, and Mike Weir.

== Scorecard ==
The Links at Crowbush Cove
| Tee | Rating/Slope | 1 | 2 | 3 | 4 | 5 | 6 | 7 | 8 | 9 | Out | 10 | 11 | 12 | 13 | 14 | 15 | 16 | 17 | 18 | In | Total |
| Black | 73.7/136 | 409 | 366 | 500 | 379 | 603 | 191 | 392 | 219 | 367 | 3426 | 463 | 565 | 191 | 413 | 515 | 393 | 360 | 135 | 464 | 3499 | 6925 |
| Gold | 73.1/134 | 380 | 332 | 476 | 357 | 579 | 182 | 363 | 188 | 360 | 3217 | 445 | 558 | 175 | 403 | 490 | 377 | 357 | 128 | 441 | 3374 | 6591 |
| White | M: 67/134 W: 76.6/142 | 348 | 306 | 467 | 334 | 567 | 156 | 331 | 161 | 324 | 2994 | 407 | 548 | 153 | 371 | 481 | 350 | 349 | 97 | 400 | 3156 | 6150 |
| Green | M: 67/120 W: 72.1/127 | 308 | 306 | 396 | 289 | 492 | 156 | 306 | 161 | 266 | 2680 | 351 | 457 | 153 | 300 | 417 | 350 | 207 | 97 | 350 | 2682 | 5362 |
| Red | M: 67/120 W: 69.3/116 | 308 | 266 | 396 | 289 | 492 | 81 | 306 | 68 | 266 | 2472 | 351 | 457 | 114 | 300 | 417 | 255 | 207 | 87 | 350 | 2538 | 5010 |
| Par | | 4 | 4 | 5 | 4 | 5 | 3 | 4 | 3 | 4 | 36 | 4 | 5 | 3 | 4 | 5 | 4 | 4 | 3 | 4 | 36 | 72 |
| SI | | 9 | 17 | 7 | 3 | 1 | 11 | 5 | 13 | 15 | | 4 | 2 | 18 | 12 | 6 | 14 | 10 | 16 | 8 |

== See also ==
- List of golf courses in Prince Edward Island
