= Rod Spittle =

Canadian professional golfer

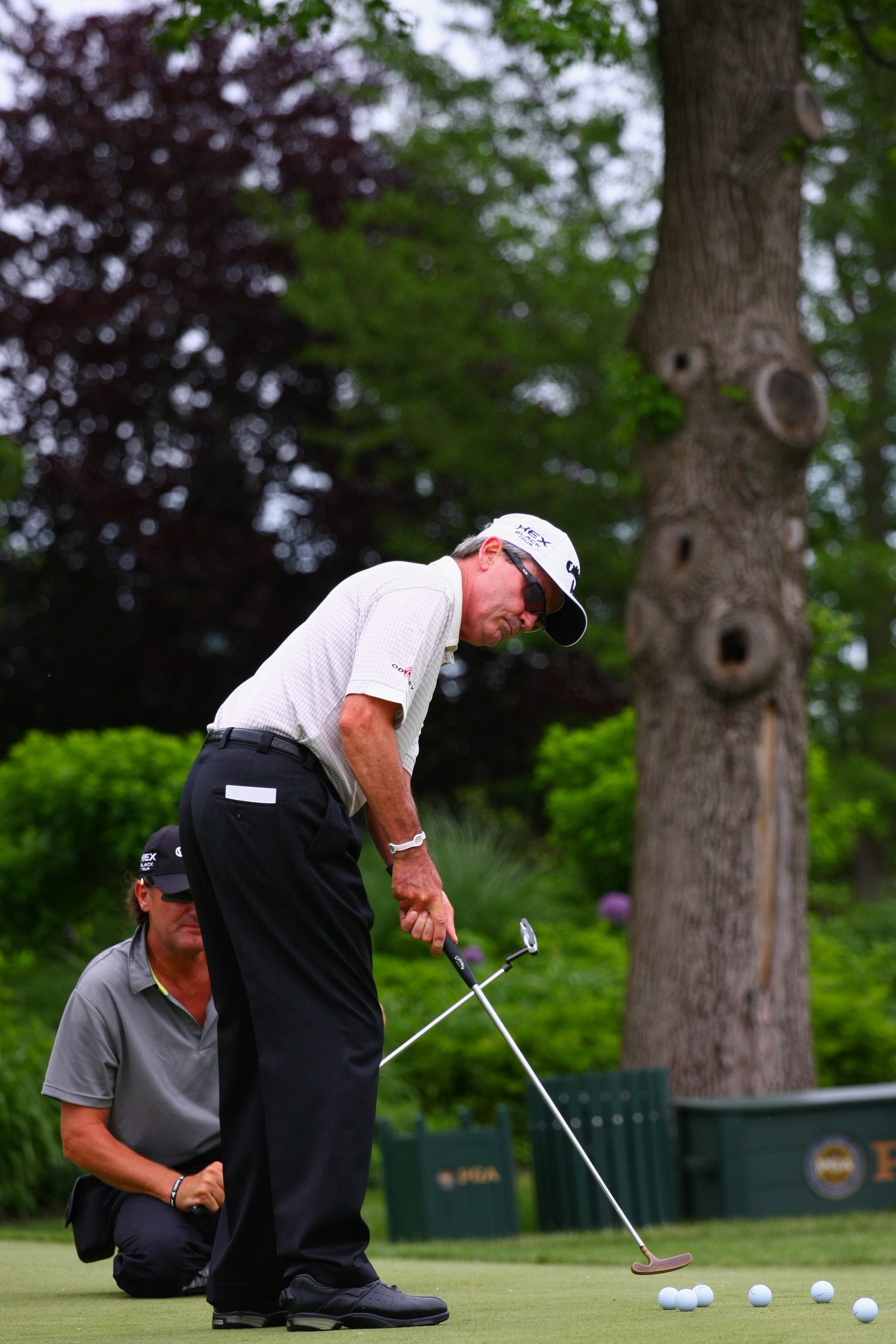
- Spittle in 2013

Personal information
- Nationality: Canada
- Born: 18 July 1955 (age 71) St. Catharines, Ontario, Canada
- Height: 6 ft 5 in (1.96 m)
- Weight: 230 lb (100 kg; 16 st)

Career
- Sport: Golf
- College: Ohio State University
- Turned professional: 2004
- Current tour: Champions Tour
- Professional wins: 1

Number of wins by tour
- PGA Tour Champions: 1

Achievements and awards
- Canadian Golf Hall of Fame: 2019

Rod Spittle (born 18 July 1955) is a Canadian professional golfer.

== Amateur career ==
Spittle was born in St. Catharines, Ontario. He played college golf at Ohio State University where his teammates included John Cook and Joey Sindelar. Spittle won the Canadian Amateur in 1977 and 1978. In 1978, Spittle graduated Ohio State with a degree in Business Administration.

After graduating, Spittle did not turn professional in golf, instead choosing to sell insurance, which he did for 25 years. He moved to Ohio, and played amateur golf at a high standard during this period.

== Professional career ==
In 2004, Spittle turned professional, shortly before turning 50. He began playing on the Champions Tour in 2005. His best finish in his first four years was a T-2 at the 2007 Greater Hickory Classic at Rock Barn. He did not play the Champions Tour at all in 2009. In 2010, he Monday-qualified into the AT&T Championship, and won the event in a one-hole sudden-death playoff over Jeff Sluman.

== Award and honors ==
In 2019, Spittle was inducted into the Canadian Golf Hall of Fame

== Amateur wins ==
- 1977 Canadian Amateur
- 1978 Canadian Amateur
- 2000 Ohio Mid-Amateur
- 2001 Ohio Mid-Amateur
- 2003 Ohio Mid-Amateur

== Professional wins (1) ==
=== Champions Tour wins (1) ===
No.	Date	Tournament	Winning score	Margin of victory	Runners-up
1	31 Oct 2010	AT&T Championship	−12 (66-68-67=201)	Playoff	(United States) Jeff Sluman

Champions Tour playoff record (1–0)

No.	Year	Tournament	Opponent	Result
1	2010	AT&T Championship	(United States) Jeff Sluman	Won with par on first extra hole
