= Canadian Amateur Championship =

Men's amateur golf championship in Canada

The Canadian Amateur Championship, begun in 1895, is the men's amateur golf championship of Canada. It is staged annually by Golf Canada. It was played at match play until 1968, went to stroke play beginning in 1969, and reverted to match play in 1995. It then returned to stroke play in 2008.

== Founding and early years ==
The Royal Canadian Golf Association was founded in June 1895, at a meeting held in Ottawa by ten charter member clubs, hosted by the Ottawa Golf Club (later the Royal Ottawa Golf Club), and the new organization was granted the prefix 'Royal' in 1896. In conjunction with the meeting, the first men's amateur championship was staged, at match play, with the Governor General of Canada, Lord Aberdeen, donating a trophy, the Aberdeen Cup, to the champion. Thomas Harley of Kingston, Ontario won the first championship.

This makes the Canadian Amateur slightly older than the U.S. Amateur, which was first staged later in 1895, and hence the third oldest national amateur championship in the world, after the British Amateur Championship, which began in 1885, and the Australian Amateur in 1894.

The Aberdeen Cup was granted in perpetuity to George Lyon, after he won three straight titles from 1905 to 1907. The original cup was retained by Lyon, but was eventually lost. A new trophy was then provided, the Earl Grey Cup. Lyon would win a total of eight Canadian titles, which is still a record, and he also won the gold medal at golf in the 1904 St. Louis Olympics.

The tournament was held annually until 1914 inclusive, but then was cancelled from 1915 to 1918 because of World War I. It resumed in 1919, and then was staged annually until 1939 inclusive, being cancelled again from 1940 to 1945 because of World War II. It has been held annually since 1946.

== Willingdon Cup ==
In 1927, the interprovincial team matches, which had begun in 1882, and held 27 times until 1921, between teams from Ontario and Quebec, but then dropped, were resumed with the start of the Willingdon Cup competition, playing for a cup donated by the Governor General, Lord Willingdon. The Willingdon Cup features teams of four top players from each province, and is held on the first two days of the Canadian Amateur, which are also the qualifying days for the balance of the tournament. The Willingdon Cup was also not played from 1940-45.

== Rotation around country ==
The Canadian Amateur stayed in Ontario and Quebec until 1921, when it went to Manitoba. It went to Alberta for the first time in 1929, to British Columbia for the first time in 1932, to Atlantic Canada for the first time in 1949, and to Saskatchewan for the first time in 1950. Since then, it has rotated around the country's top courses, with the current format allowing each of the six major golf regions (Atlantic Canada, Quebec, Ontario, Manitoba and Saskatchewan, Alberta, and British Columbia) to have its turn on approximately a six-year cycle. Among Canada's ten provinces, only Newfoundland and Labrador has yet to host it.

== Dominant players ==
The Canadian Amateur was dominated in the 1920s and 1930s by Ross Somerville, who won six titles, finished runner-up four times, and had several more near-misses. Moe Norman won back-to-back titles in 1955 and 1956. Nick Weslock waited until age 40 to win the first of his four titles in 1957. Although Gary Cowan was consistently the best Canadian amateur from the late 1950s into the mid-1970s, he managed to win only one Canadian title, in 1961, but lost in the finals four more times, as well as finishing runner-up twice in stroke play. Doug Roxburgh won his first of four crowns in 1972. Jim Nelford won two in a row from 1975–1976, then narrowly missed a third in 1977, when he lost to Rod Spittle, who won two in a row. Brent Franklin won three in a row from 1985–1987, a feat not seen since Lyon did it some eighty years earlier. Richard Scott won the Canadian title in three years out of four from 2003 to 2006. Cam Burke won two straight from 2008 to 2009.

From the late 1920s into the 1970s, the Canadian Amateur often attracted many of the top American amateurs, several of whom carried the trophy south, including Dick Chapman, Frank Stranahan, Don Cherry, Harvie Ward, Allen Miller, Dick Siderowf, and George Burns. Other leading Americans who competed but fell short include William C. Campbell, Jay Sigel, and Nathaniel Crosby. The Canadian title has also been won by South African Reg Taylor (1962), New Zealanders Stuart Jones (1967) and Gareth Paddison (2001), Mexican Rafael Alarcón (1979), and Australian Gary Simpson (1993).

To date, four players have won both the U.S. Amateur and Canadian Amateur titles: Ross Somerville, Dick Chapman, Harvie Ward, and Gary Cowan. Chapman and Ward also won The Amateur Championship of Great Britain, a title which no Canadian has yet taken.

== Winners who won PGA Tour events ==
To date, eleven players who won the Canadian Amateur have also won events on the PGA Tour. These eleven (in chronological order of their Canadian Amateur wins) are: Fred Haas, Ken Black, Frank Stranahan, Bunky Henry, Allen Miller, George Burns (golfer), Richard Zokol, Garrett Willis, Dillard Pruitt, Nick Taylor, and Mackenzie Hughes.

Rod Spittle, Canadian Amateur champion in 1977 and 1978, later won an event on the Champions Tour, the 2010 AT&T Championship in San Antonio.

== Most championships hosted ==
The Toronto Golf Club (1898, 1901, 1903, 1905, 1909, 1913, 1926, 1995, and 2017) and the Royal Ottawa Golf Club (1895, 1899, 1906, 1911, 1914, 1925, 1951, 1991, and 2016) have each hosted nine. Next are Royal Montreal Golf Club with seven (1897, 1900, 1902, 1904, 1908, 1912, and 1931) and Hamilton Golf and Country Club with six (1922, 1927, 1935, 1948, 1977, and 1994).

== Winners ==
Year	Venue	Winner	Country	Score	Runner-up
2026	Heritage Pointe Golf Club, AB	Dawson Lew	Canada	271	(Canada) Tobias Buffam 274
2025	Royal Ottawa Golf Club, QUE	Declan O'Donovan	Australia	267	(Canada) Isaiah Ibit 267
2024	Riverside Country Club, SASK	Tyler Mawhinney	United States	273	(Canada) Ashton McCulloch 274
2023	The Pulpit Club, ONT	Ashton McCulloch	Canada	277	(Canada) Phil Arci 282
2022	Point Grey Golf & Country Club, BC	Luis Carrera	Mexico	274	(Canada) Robbie Latter 276
2021	Ambassador Golf Club, ONT	Max Sekulic	Canada	267	(Canada) A.J. Ewart 269
2020	Canceled due to COVID-19 pandemic				
2019	Glen Arbour Golf Club, NS	William Buhl	Norway	273	(United States) Calvin McCoy 281
2018	Duncan Meadows, BC	Zach Bauchou	United States	266	(United States) Philip Knowles 269
2017	Toronto Golf Club & Islington Golf Club, ONT	Zach Bauchou	United States	272	(United States) Shintaro Ban 273
2016	Royal Ottawa Golf Club, QUE	Hugo Bernard	Canada	271	(China) Andy Zhang 273
2015	Weston Golf and Country Club, ONT	Billy Kennerly	United States	275	(Canada) Hugo Bernard 281 (Canada) Garrett Rank 281 (United States) Jake Shuman 281
2014	Elmhurst Golf Club, MAN	James Beale	New Zealand	276	(United States) Jonathan Garrick 276 (Canada) Taylor Pendrith 276
2013	Royal Colwood Golf Club, BC	Eli Cole	United States	276	(Canada) Corey Conners 277 (Canada) Taylor Pendrith 277
2012	Camelot Golf Club, ONT	Mackenzie Hughes	Canada	276	(Canada) Brian Churchill-Smith 277 (Canada) Chris Hemmerich 277
2011	Niakwa Country Club, MAN	Mackenzie Hughes	Canada	274	(Canada) Albin Choi 276
2010	London Hunt Club & Redtail G&CC, ONT	Albin Choi	Canada	271	(Canada) Eugene Wong 274
2009	Club de golf Le Blainvillier, QUE	Cam Burke	Canada	275	(Canada) Mitch Sutton 276
2008	Paradise Canyon Golf & Country Club, ALTA	Cam Burke	Canada	274	(Canada) Scott Stiles 278 (Canada) Eugene Wong 278
2007	Riverside, SASK	Nick Taylor	Canada	38 holes	(Canada) Michael Knight
2006	Mississaugua Golf & Country Club, ONT	Richard Scott	Canada	2 & 1	(Canada) Todd Halpen
2005	Bell Bay Golf Club, Baddeck, NS	Richard Scott	Canada	10 & 8	(Canada) Jay Snyder
2004	Beaconsfield GC, QUE	Darren Wallace	Canada	5 & 3	(Canada) Marc Bourgeois
2003	Shaughnessy Golf & Country Club, BC	Richard Scott	Canada	4 & 3	(Canada) Chris Baryla
2002	Fraser Edmundston Golf Club, NB	Dillard Pruitt	United States	6 & 5	(Canada) Michael Mezei
2001	Credit Valley G&CC, ONT	Gareth Paddison	New Zealand	8 & 7	(Canada) Graham Cooke
2000	Glendale G&CC, ALTA	Han Lee	United States	5 & 3	(Canada) Blair Buttar
1999	Rivershore Estates & Golf Links, BC	Han Lee	United States	1 up	(Canada) Wes Heffernan
1998	Hillsdale G&CC, QUE	Craig Matthew	Canada	2 & 1	(Canada) Steven Davies
1997	The Links at Crowbush Cove, PEI	Dale Goehring	Canada	1 up	(Canada) David Anthony
1996	Glendale G&CC, MAN	Rob McMillan	Canada	4 & 3	(Canada) Craig Matthew
1995	Toronto Golf Club, ONT	Garrett Willis	United States	3 & 2	(Canada) Stu Hamilton
1994	Hamilton Golf and Country Club, ONT	Warren Sye	Canada	280(P)	(Canada) Bryan DeCorso 280
1993	Victoria Golf Club, BC	Gary Simpson	Australia	281	(Canada) Stu Hamilton 282
1992	Riverside Country Club, NB	Darren Ritchie	Canada	282	(Canada) Mike Weir 284
1991	Royal Ottawa Golf Club, QUE	Jeff Kraemer	Canada	283	(Canada) Rob Anderson 285 (Canada) Steven Davies 285 (Canada) Mike Weir 285
1990	Weston Golf and Country Club, ONT	Warren Sye	Canada	281	(Canada) Jeff Cannon 283 (Canada) Arden Knoll 283
1989	Oakfield G&CC, NS	Peter Major	Canada	279	(Canada) Harvey Ellsworth 285
1988	Gallaghers Canyon, BC	Doug Roxburgh	Canada	285	(United States) Orrin Vincent 288
1987	Derrick, AB	Brent Franklin	Canada	283	(Australia) David Ecob 285
1986	Mactaquac, NB	Brent Franklin	Canada	286	(Canada) Jack Kay, Jr. 287
1985	Riverside, SASK	Brent Franklin	Canada	283(P)	(Canada) Stu Hamilton 283
1984	Sunningdale CC, ONT	Bill Swartz	Canada	285	(Canada) Danny Mijovic 287
1983	Capilano, BC	Danny Mijovic	Canada	277	(United States) Jay Sigel 284
1982	Kanawaki, QUE	Doug Roxburgh	Canada	287(P)	(Canada) Brian Christie, Jr. 287 (Canada) Stu Hamilton 287
1981	Calgary G&CC, ALTA	Richard Zokol	Canada	271(P)	(United States) Blaine McCallister 271
1980	Halifax GC (New), NS	Greg Olson	Canada	290	(Canada) Stu Hamilton 293 (Canada) Steve Hayles 293
1979	Brantford GC, ONT	Rafael Alarcón	Mexico	282	(Canada) Graham Cooke 286
1978	Laval-sur-le-Lac Club, QUE	Rod Spittle	Canada	276	(Canada) Gary Cowan 286 (United States) Bob Mase 286
1977	Hamilton Golf and Country Club, ONT	Rod Spittle	Canada	279	(Canada) Jim Nelford 281
1976	Royal Colwood G&CC, BC	Jim Nelford	Canada	287(P)	(Mexico) Rafael Alarcón 287
1975	Riverside Country Club, NB	Jim Nelford	Canada	280	(Canada) Doug Roxburgh 284
1974	Niakwa Country Club, MAN	Doug Roxburgh	Canada	280	(Canada) Gary Cowan 284
1973	Summit, ONT	George Burns	United States	284	(United States) Richard Ehrmanntraut 285 (United States) Daniel O'Neill 285
1972	Earl Grey, ALTA	Doug Roxburgh	Canada	276	(Canada) Dave Barr 280
1971	Oakfield G&CC, NS	Dick Siderowf	United States	293(P)	(Canada) Doug Roxburgh 293
1970	Ottawa Hunt, ONT	Allen Miller	United States	274	(Canada) Stu Hamilton 284 (United States) Billy Kratzert 284 (United States) Dick Siderowf 284 (United States) Jim Simons 284
1969	Westmount, ONT	Wayne McDonald	Canada	284	(United States) Dick Siderowf 285 (United States) Leonard Thompson 285
1968	Mayfair, ALTA	Jim Doyle	Canada	4 & 3	(Canada) Gary Cowan
1967	Royal Colwood, BC	Stuart Jones	New Zealand	3 & 2	(New Zealand) Ross Murray
1966	Summerlea, QUE	Nick Weslock	Canada	1 up	(United States) William Brew
1965	Pine Ridge, MAN	Bunky Henry	United States	1 up	(United States) William C. Campbell
1964	Riverside, SASK	Nick Weslock	Canada	1 up	(Canada) Gary Cowan
1963	Riverside Country Club, NB	Nick Weslock	Canada	7 & 6	(Canada) Bert Ticehurst
1962	Sunningdale CC, ONT	Reg Taylor	South Africa	4 & 2	(United States) Tom Draper
1961	Edmonton CC, ALTA	Gary Cowan	Canada	1 up	(Canada) Ted Homenuik
1960	Ottawa Hunt, ONT	Keith Alexander	Canada	4 & 3	(Canada) Gary Cowan
1959	Marine Drive, BC	John Johnston	Canada	1 up	(Canada) Gary Cowan
1958	Scarboro, ONT	Bruce Castator	Canada	1 up	(Canada) Eric Hanson
1957	St. Charles Country Club, MAN	Nick Weslock	Canada	9 & 8	(Canada) Ted Homenuik
1956	Fraser Edmundston Golf Club, NB	Moe Norman	Canada	5 & 4	(Canada) Jerry Magee
1955	Calgary G&CC, ALTA	Moe Norman	Canada	39 holes	(Canada) Lyle Crawford
1954	London Hunt, ONT	Harvie Ward	United States	5 & 4	(United States) William C. Campbell
1953	Kanawaki, QUE	Don Cherry	United States	1 up	(Canada) Don Doe
1952	Capilano, BC	Larry Bouchery	United States	37 holes	(United States) William C. Campbell
1951	Royal Ottawa Golf Club, QUE	Walter McElroy	Canada	2 & 1	(Canada) Phil Farley
1950	Saskatoon GC, SASK	Bill Mawhinney	Canada	6 & 4	(Canada) Nick Weslock
1949	Riverside Country Club, NB	Dick Chapman	United States	38 holes	(Canada) Phil Farley
1948	Hamilton Golf and Country Club, ONT	Frank Stranahan	United States	9 & 7	(Canada) C.J. Stoddard
1947	Royal-Quebec Golf Club, QUE	Frank Stranahan	United States	6 & 5	(Canada) Bill Ezinicki
1946	Mayfair, ALTA	Henry Martell	Canada	6 & 5	(Canada) Ken Black
1940-45: No Championships due to World War II
1939	Mount Bruno, QUE	Ken Black	Canada	8 & 6	(Canada) Henry Martell
1938	London Hunt Club, ONT	Ted Adams	United States	37 holes	(Canada) Ross Somerville
1937	Ottawa Hunt, ONT	Ross Somerville	Canada	2 & 1	(Canada) Phil Farley
1936	St. Charles Country Club, MAN	Fred Haas	United States	8 & 7	(Canada) Bobby Reith
1935	Hamilton Golf and Country Club, ONT	Ross Somerville	Canada	7 & 6	(Canada) Gordon Taylor, Jr.
1934	Laval-sur-le-Lac Club, QUE	Albert Campbell	United States	1 up	(Canada) Ross Somerville
1933	Shaughnessy Heights, BC	Albert Campbell	United States	3 & 2	(Canada) Ken Black
1932	Lambton Golf Club, ONT	Gordon B. Taylor	Canada	5 & 3	(Canada) Jack A. Cameron
1931	Royal Montreal Golf Club, QUE	Ross Somerville	Canada	3 & 2	(United States) Arthur Yates
1930	London Hunt Club, ONT	Ross Somerville	Canada	11 & 10	(United States) J. Wood Platt
1929	Jasper Park Golf Club, ALTA	Eddie Held	United States	3 & 2	(United States) Gardiner White
1928	Summerlea, QUE	Ross Somerville	Canada	3 & 2	(United States) William K. Lanman, Jr.
1927	Hamilton Golf and Country Club, ONT	Donald Carrick	Canada	9 & 8	(Canada) Frank Thompson
1926	Toronto Golf Club, ONT	Ross Somerville	Canada	4 & 3	(Canada) C.C. Fraser
1925	Royal Ottawa Golf Club, QUE	Donald Carrick	Canada	5 & 4	(Canada) Ross Somerville
1924	Rosedale Golf Club, ONT	Frank Thompson	Canada	3 & 1	(Canada) Ross Somerville
1923	Kanawaki Golf Club, QUE	W.J. Thompson	Canada	3 & 2	(Canada) Redvers Mackenzie
1922	Hamilton Golf and Country Club, ONT	C.C. Fraser	Canada	37 holes	(Canada) Norman Scott
1921	Winnipeg GC, MAN	Frank Thompson	Canada	38 holes	(Canada) C.W. Hague
1920	Beaconsfield GC, QUE	C.B. Grier	Canada	5 & 4	(Canada) Tom Gillespie
1919	Lambton Golf Club, ONT	William McLuckie	Canada	6 & 4	(Canada) G.H. Turpin
1915-18: No Championships due to World War I
1914	Royal Ottawa Golf Club	George Lyon	Canada	8 & 7	(United States) Brice Evans
1913	Toronto Golf Club, ONT	G.H. Turpin	Canada	1 up	(Canada) Gerald Lees
1912	Royal Montreal Golf Club, QUE	George Lyon	Canada	6 & 5	(Canada) A. Hutcheson
1911	Royal Ottawa Golf Club	G.H. Hutton	Canada	39 holes	(Canada) A.E. Austin
1910	Lambton Golf Club, ONT	Fritz Martin	Canada	37 holes	(Canada) George Lyon
1909	Toronto Golf Club, ONT	E. Legge	Canada	1 up	(Canada) G.F. Moss
1908	Royal Montreal Golf Club, QUE	A. Wilson, Jr.	Canada	1 up	(Canada) Fritz Martin
1907	Lambton Golf Club, ONT	George Lyon	Canada	3 & 2	(Canada) Fritz Martin
1906	Royal Ottawa Golf Club	George Lyon	Canada	5 & 4	(Canada) Douglas Laird
1905	Toronto Golf Club, ONT	George Lyon	Canada	12 & 11	(Canada) R.S. Strath
1904	Royal Montreal Golf Club, QUE	J. Percy Taylor	Canada	5 & 3	(Canada) George Lyon
1903	Toronto Golf Club, ONT	George Lyon	Canada	10 & 8	(Canada) M.C. Cameron
1902	Royal Montreal Golf Club, QUE	Fritz Martin	Canada	1 up	(Canada) R.C.H Cassells
1901	Toronto Golf Club, ONT	W.A.H. Kerr	Canada	38 holes	(Canada) J. Percy Taylor
1900	Royal Montreal Golf Club, QUE	George Lyon	Canada	38 holes	(Canada) Gordon W. McDougall
1899	Royal Ottawa Golf Club	Vere C. Brown	Canada	5 & 3	(Canada) Stewart Gillespie
1898	Toronto Golf Club, ONT	George Lyon	Canada	12 & 11	(Canada) G.H.F. Pattison
1897	Royal Montreal Golf Club, QUE	W.A.H. Kerr	Canada	5 & 4	(Canada) R.T. Henderson
1896	Royal-Quebec Golf Club, QUE	Stewart Gillespie	Canada	4 & 3	(Canada) W.A. Griffith
1895	Royal Ottawa Golf Club	Thomas Harley	Canada	7 & 5	(Canada) A. Simpson
