= Willingdon Cup =

Annual amateur golf team competition

The Willingdon Cup is an annual amateur golf team competition among Canada's provinces.

== History ==
The Governor General of Canada, Lord Willingdon, donated the cup to Golf Canada (then known as the Royal Canadian Golf Association) in 1927, for annual rivalry among men's amateur teams from the provinces of Canada. It has been played annually ever since, except for 1940-1945, when it was cancelled because of World War II. Each province selects a four-man team of its best players, and competition is held over two rounds, in conjunction with the Canadian Amateur Championship, usually in August. Until 1974, all four scores each day counted, and since that year, the best three of four count, towards the team total.

Ontario has won the most titles, followed by British Columbia. Nick Weslock (Ontario) and Keith Alexander (Alberta) share the record for appearances, each being selected 26 times. The Willingdon Cup has done more than any other event to raise the standard of amateur golf in Canada.
