= Priddis Greens =

- Hamlet
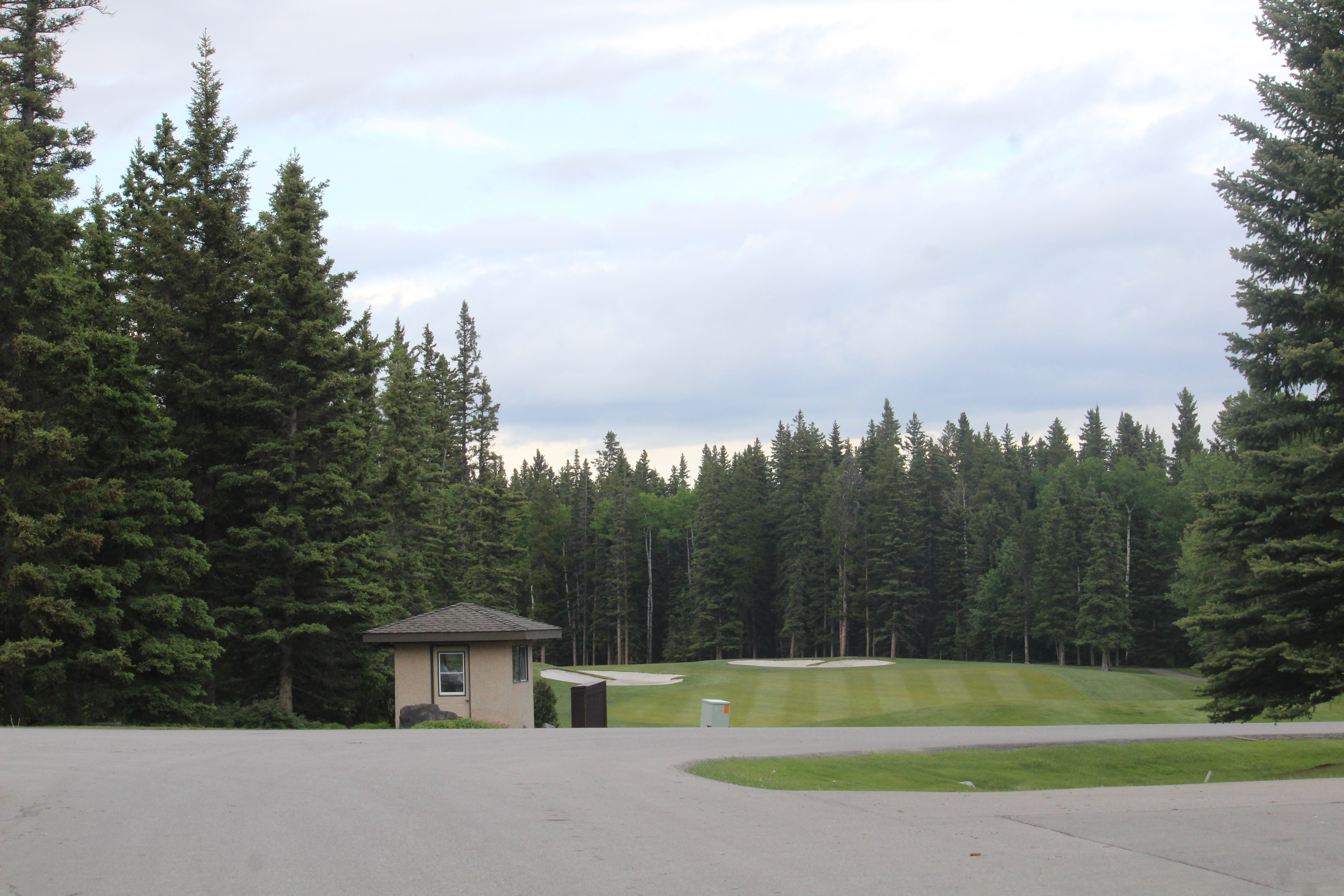
- The Priddis Greens Golf & Country Club in Priddis Greens

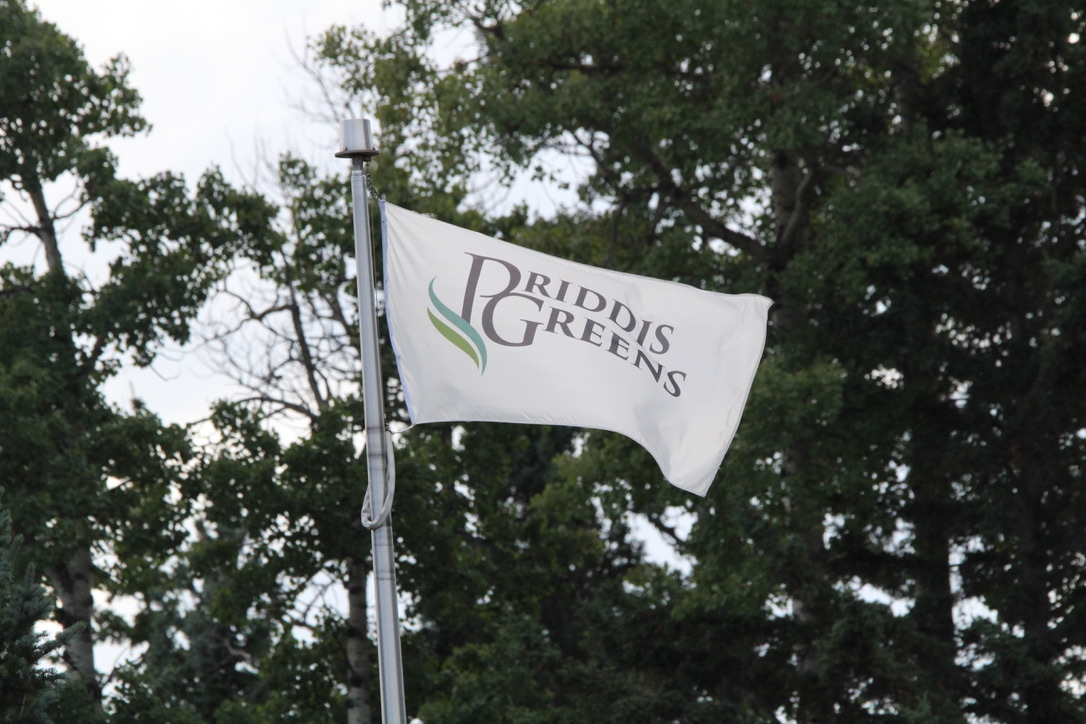
- Flag

- Location of Priddis Greens Priddis Greens (Canada)
- Coordinates: 50°53′43″N 114°24′10″W
- Country: Canada
- Province: Alberta
- Region: Calgary Metropolitan Region
- Census division: 6
- Municipal district: Foothills County

Government
  - Type: Unincorporated
  - Governing body: Foothills County Council

Population (2003)
  - Total: 267
- Time zone: UTC−06:00 (Alberta Time)
- Area codes: 403, 587, 825

Priddis Greens is a hamlet in Alberta, Canada within the Foothills County. It is located approximately 6 kilometres (3.7 mi) west of the Hamlet of Priddis, 13 kilometres (8.1 mi) southeast of the Hamlet of Bragg Creek and 20 kilometres (12 mi) southwest of the City of Calgary. The hamlet is developed in two residential nodes adjacent to the Priddis Greens Golf & Country Club.

== Demographics ==
The population of Priddis Greens according to the 2003 municipal census conducted by Foothills County is 267.

== Golf and country club ==
The Priddis Greens Golf & Country Club is a fully private golf club that consists of two 18-hole championship courses (Hawk and Raven). The price for a membership is $40,000 (2024).

In July 2003, Priddis Greens Golf & Country Club was awarded GOLD status in the Best Private Course in Canada category by Score Golf Magazine's Golfers’ Choice Awards.

2016: Score Magazine ranked Priddis Greens (Hawk) 50th out of the “Top 100 Clubs in Canada”

=== Tournaments ===
The Priddis Greens Golf & Country Club has hosted the following major tournament events:

- CP Women's Open - August 2016
- CN Canadian Women's Open - 2009
- Alberta PGA Players Tour - 2008
- Alberta Senior Ladies Championship - 2007
- Alberta PGA Head Pro Championship - 2003
- Alberta Mid Amateur - 2001
- Alberta PGA Championship - 2000
- du Maurier Classic - 1999
- Canadian Amputee Open - 1997
- City Lady Amateur - 1996
- George Reed's Club 34 Pro Am - 1988 to 1995
- Canadian Club Professionals - 1994
- Men's City Amateur - 1993
- Junior Team Trials - 1993
- City Senior Ladies Amateur - 1991
- City Men's Medalist - 1988
- Alberta Mid Amateur - 1987

== See also ==
- List of communities in Alberta
- List of hamlets in Alberta
