= Royal Montreal Golf Club =

Golf club in Montreal, Quebec

Coordinates: 45.493°N 73.902°W

- Abbreviation: RMGC
- Formation: 4 November 1873
- Type: Private
- Location: 25 South Ridge, Île Bizard, Quebec
- Affiliations: Royal Canadian Golf Association
- Website: rmgc.org

The Royal Montreal Golf Club (French: Le Club de Golf Royal Montréal) is a private golf course located on Île Bizard that has existed since 1873. It is the second-oldest golf club in North America, (the oldest being The Savannah Golf Club, in Savannah, Georgia, USA; established in 1794) and the oldest in continuous existence. The club has occupied its current location since 1959, and features 45 holes across three courses. Founded in Montreal in 1873 by eight men led by Alexander Dennistoun. In 1884, Permission was granted by Queen Victoria to use the royal prefix. The club celebrated its 150-year anniversary in 2023.

== History ==
Royal Montreal was founded in Montreal in 1873 by a group of eight men led by Mr. Alexander Dennistoun, a Scottish-born man who was also named as the club's first Captain.

In Montreal, golf was first played on the pasturelands of Mount Royal Park in 1871, two years prior to the grand opening of the club. The club's first course was a 9-hole layout on Fletcher's Field in Mount Royal Park, which the red-coated golfers shared with the public on the then outskirts of Montreal. This marked the beginning of organized golf in Canada.

Golf's early expansion in Canada was driven by the newly furnished railways and roads, providing affluent urbanites access to the countryside and leisure landscapes.

In 1884, Permission was granted by Queen Victoria to use the royal prefix. Royal Montreal became the first golf club outside of the United Kingdom to receive this honour.

The Dixie era (1891-1959)

By 1891, the club was forced to relocate due to residential surplus around the town of Mount Royal. The club purchased farmland west of the city, then known as Dixie (Now Dorval), favourably accessible by railway. Beginning in 1896, the new course and clubhouse were opened; the Dixie era.

Throughout this period, the club was selected to host various significant tournaments. They hosted the third Canadian Amateur Championship (1897), the first Canadian Open (1904), and the first Canadian Women's Amateur (1901). Additionally, two-time Canadian Open Champion Charles Murray became a member at the club in 1905 and remained for 33 years. He served as the head professional at Royal Montreal from 1905 until his death in 1938.

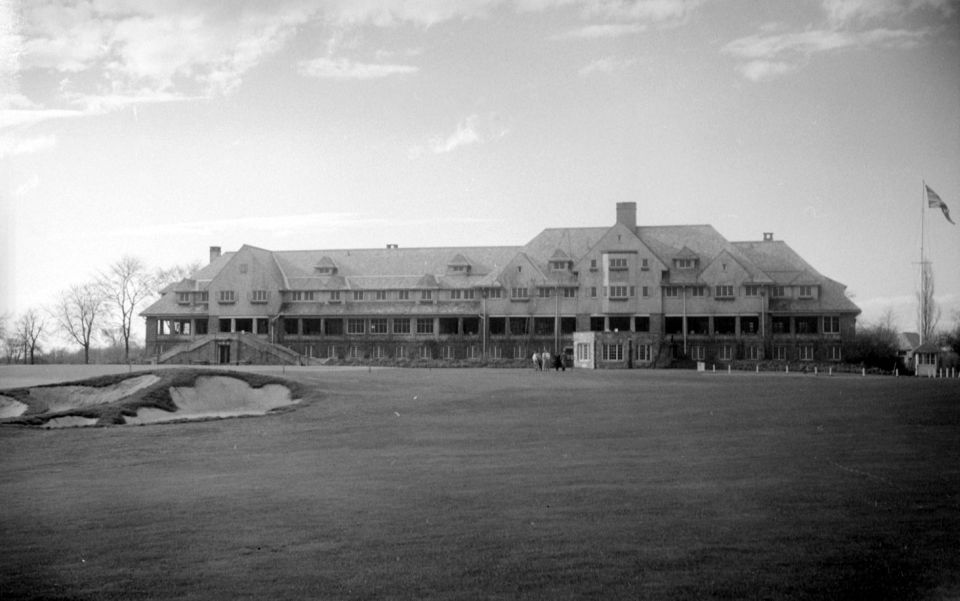
The 1922 clubhouse designed by J. Melville Miller and Charles J. Saxe at 100 boulevard Bouchard in Dorval. It burned down in April 2020.

The Dixie era remained an honoured landmark in the Montreal community for decades before it was repurposed as Queen's Angels Academy, and later Collège Saint-Anne. Unfortunately, this 124-year-old structure was reportedly set ablaze and burned down on September 15, 2020.

Île Bizard and Modern Development era (1959–present)

In 1959, the club was once again relocated due to the nearby urban growth. The new club was constructed by American architect Dick Wilson, who was assisted by Joe Lee. The facility consisted of 45 holes divided among three different courses: the Blue course (18 holes), the Red course (18 holes), and the Dixie course (9 holes).

Shortly after the opening of the club, the Blue course quickly gained recognition and international acclaim due to its strategically challenging layout and pristine condition. The course became host to numerous professional tournaments, helping organize the Presidents Cup and the Canadian Open. It became one of Canada's leading venues for professional golf. In 2004, to modernize play, architect Rees Jones pursued large renovation plans to lengthen and toughen the Blue course in preparation for professional play.

Royal Montreal was one of the five founding Clubs of the Royal Canadian Golf Association, established in 1895 as the governing body of golf in Canada. The Blue Course is routinely cited as a preeminent Canadian golf course and among the best in the world.

Royal Montreal has hosted numerous major tournaments, including the Presidents Cup in 2007 and in 2024, and five Canadian Opens at the Île Bizard location (1975, 1980, 1997, 2001 and 2014). These events substantiate the club's historic prestige and international acclaim. One event regularly viewed as a benchmark in Canadian golf history is the defeat of Tiger Woods in the 2007 Presidents Cup.

== Legacy ==
As one of the founding facilities of the Royal Canadian Golf Association, the Royal Montreal holds a foundational place in Canadian golf history. The club has enriched Canada's international status in the sport as host of various significant events, including the Presidents Cup and the Canadian Open. Its impact on the professional tour serves as a symbol of the country's golfing legacy.

== Tournaments hosted ==
Year	Tournament	Winner/Notes
1897	Canadian Amateur Championship	Third edition held at the original Dixie clubhouse
1901	Canadian Women's Amateur	Miss Lillias Young
1904	Canadian Open	John H. Oke (first Canadian Open ever held)
1908/1913	Canadian Open	Charles Murray (Club professional at Royal Montreal)
1926	Canadian Open	Macdonald Smith
1950	Canadian Open	Jim Ferrier (Final major held at Dixie site)
1975	Canadian Open	Tom Weiskopf (First major on Blue course)
1980	Canadian Open	Bob Gilder
1997	Canadian Open	Steve Jones (First time Tiger Woods missed a professional cut)
2001	Canadian Open	Scott Verplank
2007	Presidents Cup	Team USA (captain Jack Nicklaus) defeats Team International (captain Gary Player)
2014	RBC Canadian Open	Tim Clark
2024	Presidents Cup	Team USA (captain Jim Furyk) defeats Team International (captain Mike Weir)

== Club professionals ==
- Willie Davis (1873)
- Bennet Lang
- Tom Smith
- James Black
- Charlie Murray
- Kenneth Murray
- Pat Fletcher
- Bruce Murray
- Bob Hogarth
- Scott Dickson
- Dennis Firth
- Douglas Rankin

== Presidents ==
- 1873–1881 – Alexander Dennistoun
- 1882–1883 – John Taylor
- 1884–1888 – Sir George Alexander Drummond
- 1889–1890 – J. G. Sidey
- 1891–1892 – Rev. James Barclay, D.D.
- 1893 – John Taylor
- 1894–1896 – John L. Morris, Q.C.
- 1897 – Frederick Stancliffe
- 1898 – W. W. Watson
- 1899–1901 – G. H. Balfour
- 1902–1903 – Fayette Brown
- 1904–1907 – R. F. Ruttan
- 1908–1910 – Sir John Andrew Macphail
- 1911–1912 – J. T. McCall
- 1913–1914 – Anson McKim
- 1915–1921 – Walter R. Baker, C.V.O.
- 1922–1923 – J. J. McGill
- 1924–1925 – J. W. McConnell
- 1926–1928 – E. A. Macnutt
- 1929–1931 – T. S. Gillespie
- 1932–1934 – W. W. Robinson
- 1935–1937 – R. P. Jellett
- 1938–1940 – Alfred Collyer
- 1941–1943 – P. S. Gregory
- 1944–1946 – J. Colin Kemp
- 1947–1949 – Kenneth G. Blackader
- 1950–1952 – H. B. McLean
- 1953–1955 – John de M. Marler, Q.C.
- 1956–1957 – S. H. Dobell
- 1958–1959 – C. C. Thackray
- 1960–1961 – E. D. Gordon
- 1962–1964 – J. A. Fuller
- 1965–1966 – Matthew S. Hannon, Q.C.
- 1967–1968 – Hugh McLeod
- 1969–1970 – Robert P. Fleming
- 1971–1972 – Russell A. Warren

== See also ==
- List of Canadian organizations with royal patronage
- List of golf clubs granted Royal status
- List of golf courses in Quebec
