= Victoria Golf Club =

Golf course in Canada

Coordinates: 48.415°N 123.300°W

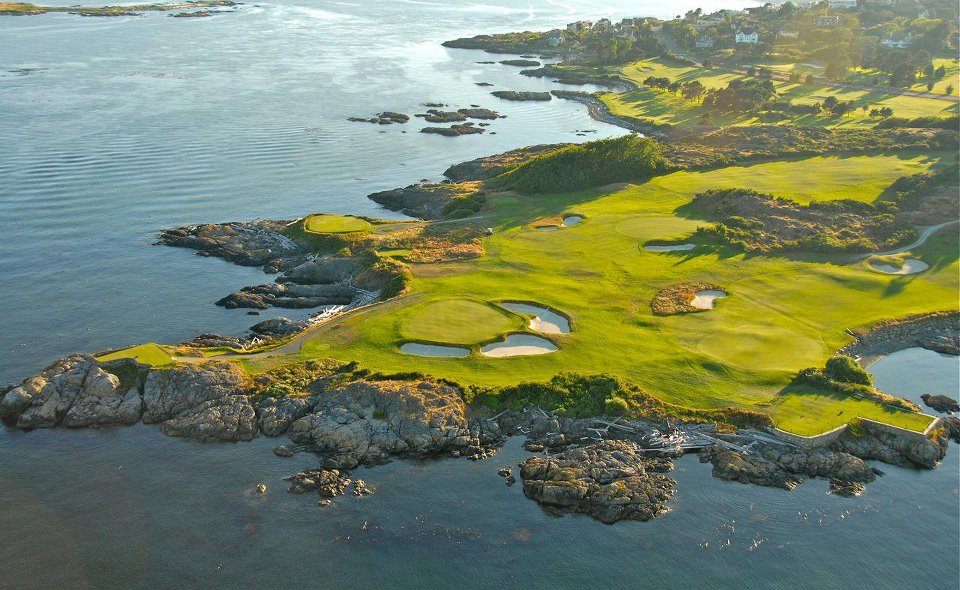
Aerial view of Victoria Golf Club.

The Victoria Golf Club is a golf course located in the city of Oak Bay, British Columbia, Canada, which is part of metropolitan Victoria. It was established in 1893, and is now the oldest golf club in Canada still located on its original site; a rocky point on the South Eastern tip of Vancouver Island, overlooking the Strait of Juan de Fuca. It is also one of Canada's few courses that is open for play an average of 360 days per year. Several holes provide views of the ocean.

The course today plays to par 70 for men, 73 for women, and its length is just over 6,000 yards from the back tees. The club celebrated its centennial in 1993, by hosting the Canadian Amateur Championship.

== See also ==
- List of golf courses in British Columbia
