= Tom McBroom =

Canadian golf course architect

Thomas McBroom (born September 17, 1952) is a Canadian golf course architect.

McBroom is the principal and founder of Thomas McBroom Associates Ltd., a Toronto-based landscape architecture firm specializing in golf course design. McBroom holds a Bachelor of Landscape Architecture (BLA) from the University of Guelph. He is a member of the American Society of Golf Course Architects. As of early 2007, McBroom had completed over 40 original course designs and led numerous course renovations of varying scale.

McBroom lives in Toronto, Ontario. He is married and has two children.

== Recognition ==
There are 12 McBroom designs listed in the 2006 SCOREGolf Magazine "Top 100 Golf Courses in Canada": Beacon Hall (5), Crowbush Cove (10), Rocky Crest (19), Deerhurst Highlands (30), Le Géant (34), Deer Ridge (39), Bell Bay (40), Heron Point (52), Granite Golf (80), Algonquin (82), Lake Joseph (86) and National Pines (92).

McBroom designs have been the recipient of the Golf Digest "Best New Canadian Course" award 6 times: The Links at Crowbush Cove (1994), The Lake Joseph Club (1997), Bell Bay Golf Club (1998), Timberwolf Golf Club (2000), The Ridge at Manitou (2006), and Tobiano (2008).
