= Canadian Golf Hall of Fame =

Sports museum in Oakville, Ontario, Canada

Canadian Golf Hall of Fame and Museum
- Location: Oakville, Ontario Canada
- Coordinates: 43°27′08″N 79°43′06″W
- Type: sports museum
- Website: Official web site

The Canadian Golf Hall of Fame and Museum is a museum and hall of fame covering the history of the game of golf in Canada, and celebrating the careers and accomplishments of the most significant contributors to the game in that country. Operated by Golf Canada (governed by the Royal Canadian Golf Association), the governing body of golf in Canada, it is located on the grounds of Glen Abbey Golf Course in Oakville, Ontario, Canada, and is composed of an exhibit space (designed around 18 display spaces or 'holes'), a golf-related research library, and archives (containing both historical materials and the corporate records of the RCGA).

The Canadian Golf Hall of Fame is affiliated with the Canadian Museums Association, the Canadian Heritage Information Network, the International Sports Heritage Association, the Canadian Association for Sports Heritage, the Ontario Museum Association, and the Virtual Museum of Canada.

== Inductees ==
Inductees in the hall of fame are divided into three categories: professional players, amateur players and builders - this last being those who have contributed to the development and success of the game in some exceptional fashion, whether it be primarily as coaches, superintendents, golf course architects, historians, or any other capacity.

In alphabetical order, the members are:

- R. Keith Alexander
- Stephen Ames
- Jerry Anderson
- Al Balding
- James A. Barclay
- Dave Barr
- David L. Black
- Kenneth Black
- Gayle Borthwick
- Jocelyne Bourassa
- Pat Bradley
- Peter Broome
- Gordie Brydson
- Dorothy Campbell Hurd Howe
- Donald Carrick
- Dawn Coe-Jones
- Graham Cooke
- Geoffrey Cornish
- Gary Cowan
- George Cumming
- Marion Doherty
- Judy (Darling) Evans
- Phil Farley
- Pat Fletcher
- Bruce Forbes
- Brent Franklin
- Gail Graham
- Richard Grimm
- Dan Halldorson
- Florence Harvey
- Mary Ann Hayward
- Wilf Homenuik
- Jules Huot
- Lorie Kane
- Karl Keffer
- Ben Kern
- George Knudson
- Willie Lamb
- Stan Leonard
- George Lyon
- A.V. "Mac" Macan
- Charles Blair Macdonald
- Ada Mackenzie
- Henry Martell
- Fritz Martin
- Roderick Hugh McIsaac
- Jack McLaughlin
- Lisa Meldrum
- Gail Moore
- Alison Murdoch
- Albert Murray
- Charles Murray
- Jim Nelford
- Jack Nicklaus
- Moe Norman
- Herb Page
- Marilyn Palmer O'Connor
- Bob Panasik
- Claude Pattemore
- Sandra Post
- Ralph Reville
- Clinton Robinson
- Stephen Ross
- Doug Roxburgh
- Lorne Rubenstein
- Jim Rutledge
- Richard Scott
- Alena Sharp
- Cathy Sherk
- Douglas Howard Silverberg
- C. Ross (Sandy) Somerville
- Rod Spittle
- Betty Stanhope-Cole
- John B. Steel
- Marlene Stewart Streit
- Alexa Stirling Fraser
- Violet Pooley Sweeny
- Warren Sye
- Gordon B. Taylor
- Stanley Thompson
- Mabel Gordon Thomson
- Margaret Todd
- Lee Trevino
- Murray Carlyle Tucker
- Bob Vokey
- Lisa (Young) Walters
- Bob Weeks
- Mike Weir
- Robert Stanley Weir
- Nick Weslock
- Gordon Witteveen
- Robert Wylie
- Richard Zokol
