= Golf Canada =

Governing body of golf in Canada

- Royal Canadian Golf Association
- Sport: Golf
- Jurisdiction: Canada (federal)
- Abbreviation: RCGA
- Founded: 1895; 131 years ago
- Headquarters: Caledon, Ontario
- President: Adam Daifallah
- CEO: Laurence Applebaum

Official website
- www.golfcanada.ca
- (Canada)

The Royal Canadian Golf Association (RCGA), branded as Golf Canada, is the governing body of golf in Canada.

== Beginnings ==
It was founded as the Canadian Golf Association on June 6, 1895, at the Royal Ottawa Golf Club. The 'Royal' prefix was granted in June 1896 by Queen Victoria through the Governor General of Canada at that time, Lord Aberdeen, who was a patron of the association, and himself a keen golfer.

The first real international boom in golf happened during the 1890s. In response to this, the first golfing associations were formed – the Golfing Union of Ireland in 1891 and the Ladies' Golf Union in 1893. The organization of golf in Britain itself was directed to The Royal and Ancient Golf Club of St Andrews as the historic seat of golf. In 1894, two attempts to establish a national championship in the United States were made, neither of which became recognized as the national championship. Later in 1894, representatives from five prominent U.S. clubs gathered to form the United States Golf Association.

== Founding, stages Canadian Amateur ==
The first meeting to discuss the formation of a Canadian Golf Association was held on June 6, 1895, at the Royal Ottawa Golf Club. The secretary of the club, Alex Simpson, was a strong proponent of organizing a national organization to conduct national championships. In 1895, he invited clubs from across Canada to attend "the first national golf championship" and to discuss the organization of an association with the mandate of conducting such events. It was agreed that such an association should be formed and would hold its first Annual General Meeting on September 27, at the time of the Interprovincial Matches between Ontario and Quebec.

The constitution drawn up for the purpose stated the objectives of the organization as: "promote interest in the game of golf; the protection of the mutual interests of its members; establish and enforce uniformity in the rules of game by creating a representative authority; its Executive Committee to be a court of reference as a final authority in matters of controversy; to establish a uniform system of handicapping; to decide on what links the Amateur and Open Championship shall be played."

The constitution was signed by the following ten clubs from across Canada:

- Royal Montreal Golf Club
- Royal Quebec Golf Club
- Royal Ottawa Golf Club
- Kingston Golf Club
- Toronto Golf Club
- Rosedale Golf Club
- Hamilton Golf and Country Club
- London Golf Club
- Winnipeg Golf Club
- Victoria Golf Club

The first officers of the organization were:

Role	Name
President:	Hon. George A. Drummond, Royal Montreal Golf Club
Vice Presidents:	Lt-Col. D.T. Irwin, Royal Ottawa; John Hamilton, Royal Quebec Golf Club
Hon. Secretary:	W.C.J. Hall, Royal Quebec Golf Club
Members:	Charles Hunter, Toronto Golf and Niagara-on-the-Lake; Lt.-Col. Cotton, Kingston Golf Club; J.F. Kirk, Rosedale Golf Club; J.L. Morris, Royal Montreal; F.P. Betts, London

The prefix 'Royal' was granted in June 1896 by Queen Victoria. There were two categories of membership in the RCGA when it was formed – 'Allied', which meant it was a regularly constituted golf club in Canada, and 'Associate', which was also to have a golf course, clubhouse and at least 25 members.

Membership in the RCGA was:

Year	Membership
1895	10 clubs
1898	Associates: 11, Allied: 3
1902	20
1905	33
1961	512
1990	1500

== Canadian Open ==
The Canadian Amateur Championship was to continue annually as it had operated in 1895, at match play, with the prize the Aberdeen Cup, donated by the Governor-General. In 1898, the RCGA, in conjunction with the USGA, conducted the first International Golf Matches at the Toronto Golf Club. In 1901, the organization introduced the Canadian Ladies' Amateur Championship, held at Royal Montreal Golf Club. Three years later, the need for an Open championship for both amateur and professional golfers was determined, with sufficient professional golfers in Canada, and the first Canadian Open Golf Championship was held over the Royal Montreal Golf Club in 1904.

== Organizational details ==
The RCGA formed its first standing committee for the rules of golf in 1916, although it had printed its first edition of the rules in 1914.

In 1919, the first staff person, B.L. Anderson, was hired. He had served as volunteer secretary during World War I, and was hired for part-time work for the association as the Secretary-Treasurer. Anderson stayed with the RCGA as Secretary until retirement in 1945. He became known as the face of the RCGA, along with his own secretary, Marion Doherty.

Funding continued as a fee per club until 1948, when the RCGA instituted the dollar a year plan. The concept was that each golf club would remit $1.00 for each male member (after having collected from the member in their annual dues). $0.50 was to go to the RCGA and the same amount would be remitted to the appropriated provincial association. This revolutionized the associations which had suffered for decades from chronic lack of funding.

The first handicapping system sponsored by Canada was done in 1937, believed to be based upon an American system, using the five lowest scores of the current season. The second system was presented in 1949 on an interim basis, and officially in 1950. It was revised again in 1960, and several times afterwards.

In 1924, the Canadian Ladies' Golf Union (formed in 1913) took over the operation of the Canadian Ladies' Amateur Championship from the RCGA.

Since 2003, Golf Canada has had the Team Canada program as a staple for the Organization. The goal of this program is to develop young male and female golfers to become top ranked amateur players. The program has a rigorous selection each November to place golfers on either the National or Junior teams. Team Canada has participants active year round, and provides both physical and mental coaching for golfers.

The association was given national sport organization status by the federal government in 2005 and rebranded itself as Golf Canada in 2010, though remaining incorporated as the Royal Canadian Golf Association.

== Willingdon Cup ==
1927 saw the resurrection of the Interprovincial Team Matches. These matches had been played since 1882, primarily between Quebec and Ontario. Discontinued in 1921, the need to improve the national scope of the association, and in particular its championships, coincided with the concept of team expenses provided being allowed. To ensure the "cream" of the amateur players in each province were available to participate in the Amateur (notwithstanding long distance travel), the Interprovincial Matches were reintroduced as the "Willingdon Cup Matches for the Interprovincial Championship" encouraging each province to send a team of four to the Amateur. The Governor General, Lord Willingdon, provided the cup which is still played for today. The Willingdon Cup matches have likely done more than any other event to raise the standard of amateur golf in Canada.

== Junior Championship ==
In the 1930s, the national body was approached about beginning a national junior championship. In 1938, a new element was added to the Amateur Championship – that of Junior Title holder. A junior from each province could accompany the Willingdon Cup team as an alternate, and participate in the Amateur. The low scorer would become the Junior Champion. In 1959, the tournament was separated from the Canadian Amateur Championship, and became a full-fledged match play tournament in its own right. A juvenile component was added in 1970, and interprovincial team matches had been added to the tournament in 1959. Both tournaments are run at stroke play today.

== Senior Championship and others ==
In 1962, the RCGA introduced its first Senior Championship of Canada. The Canadian Senior Golf Association had been formed in 1918 and conducted its own championship. However, by 1962, it became clear that there was a need for another tournament. The Senior Championship of Canada was established as an RCGA event, open to any member of any RCGA member club. The CSGA was/is a membership based organization and fulfills a largely social element of the game.

In 1986, the Canadian Club Champions' Championship was introduced, followed by the Mid-Amateur Championship in 1987.

== Canada in international golf ==
Golf Canada also has a long history of sending teams to international competitions. The first overseas team was formed in 1935 to go to the United Kingdom, to play in the British Amateur Championship, and in a number of relatively informal team matches. In 1954 the first official RCGA team event took place with the introduction of the Americas Cup Matches. Played between 1954 and 1967, these matches were played between Mexico, the USA and Canada. The Canadians brought home the honours in 1965. Other International events Golf Canada has been much involved in are the World Amateur Team Matches for the Eisenhower Trophy, since 1958: winning in 1986, placing second in 1962, 1964, 1978, 2006, and 2014, and hosting these "Olympics" of golf in 1992; the Commonwealth Tournament matches, won by Canada in 1971 and 1975, discontinued in 1975; and the Simon Bolivar Biennial Tournament, won in 1981 by Doug Roxburgh and Gary Cowan representing Canada.

During the 2016 Rio Olympics, Team Canada participated in the first golf competition in over 100 years. Selected for the team on the men's side were Graham DeLaet and David Hearn. DeLaet finished 20th overall, while Hearn finished 30th. For the Women Brooke Henderson and Alena Sharp participated. Henderson finished in a tie for 7th, while Sharp finished 30th.

== Agronomy, history ==
The RCGA also recognized the needs of the game outside of tournament play and first began a Green Section in the 1920s. Although this faded in and out throughout the next several decades, it continued until ending in 2007. In the 1950s, golf architect agronomist Robbie Robinson served the RCGA in a number of positions, including as general manager. Throughout the 1960s and 1970s, the RCGA operated a consulting program which was operated through part-time consultants. In 1991 the Association hired a permanent staff person for the Green Section, and has been involved in developing environmental guidelines, among other key materials, for golf courses today.

In the 1950s, the RCGA first began collecting "relics" of the game, to preserve the history of Canadian golf. In 1975, with the move to Glen Abbey Golf Course, the RCGA established a golf museum and a location to showcase the Canadian Golf Hall of Fame, established in 1971. With the donation of $800,000 from the Shore Foundation, a building was erected at Glen Abbey as a home for the museum, the Hall of Fame and a library/archive on the game.

== Permanent site for Canadian Open ==
In the 1970s, the RCGA made the decision to move the Canadian Open to a permanent site at Glen Abbey Golf Course in Oakville, Ontario, along with headquarters of the association. The RCGA purchased the golf course in the early 1980s, and held the national open championship over the course from 1977 to 2000, with the exceptions of 1980 and 1997, when it was moved to Royal Montreal Golf Club. In 1999, the RCGA completed the sale of the property to ClubLink Corp. The Canadian Open returned to Glen Abbey in 2004, and was played there again in 2008 and 2009. The tournament once more moves around the country to top courses.

Glen Abbey is home to Golf Canada and the Canadian Golf Hall of Fame, and it has hosted 25 Canadian Open Championships, more than any other course. The owner since 2005, Clublink Corp, filed an application in October 2015 to redevelop the property into a residential community, with offices and retail stores. There was no provision for a golf course in the plan. The Town of Oakville Council responded in August 2017 by declaring the golf course a heritage site under the Ontario Heritage Act. This would make it more difficult for ClubLink to develop the area as it had planned, with 3,222 housing units and 122,000 square feet (11,300 m^{2}) of retail and commercial space. Golf Canada was also concerned since it could not predict whether it could get the necessary permit to hold the Canadian Open at Glen Abbey in 2018.

== Amalgamation with Ladies' Association ==
The Royal Canadian Golf Association merged with the Canadian Ladies' Golf Association in January 2005, and now administers the game for both men and women. The tournaments conducted by the association include:

- Canadian Open
- Canadian Women's Open
- Canadian Amateur Championship
- Canadian Women's Amateur Championship
- Canadian Junior Championship
- Canadian Junior Girl's Championship
- Canadian Senior Championship
- Canadian Senior Women's Championship
- Canadian Mid-Amateur Championship
- Canadian Senior Match Play Championship
- Future Links Series
- CN Canadian Women's Tour

== Services ==
Other programs of Golf Canada include a Canada-wide Agronomy Program, a Player Development division dedicated to providing opportunities for top golfers to reach their potential in competitive golf, the RCGA Foundation which raises funds for Golf Programs at Canadian Universities, and the Golf Programs and Services Division which operates the CN Future Links program, Handicapping and Course Rating, the Canadian Golf Hall of Fame and Museum and maintaining the Rules of Golf.

== See also ==
- List of golf courses in Canada
