= List of golf courses in Canada =

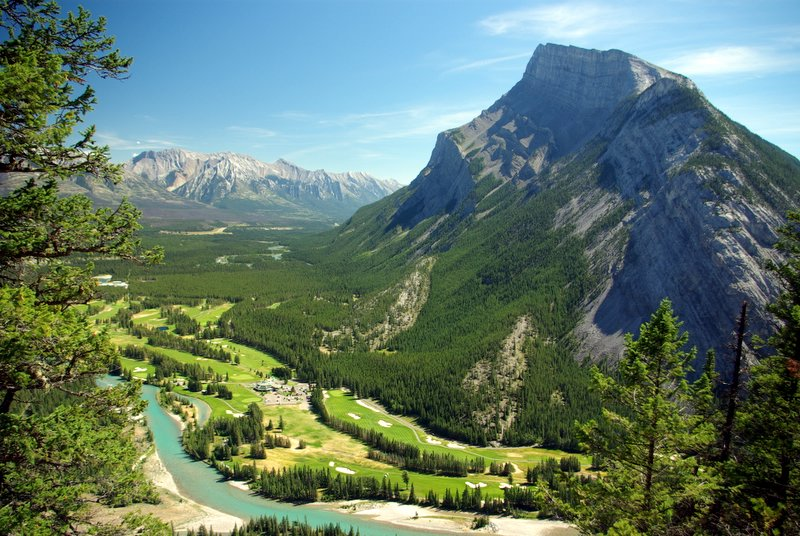
Banff Springs golf course

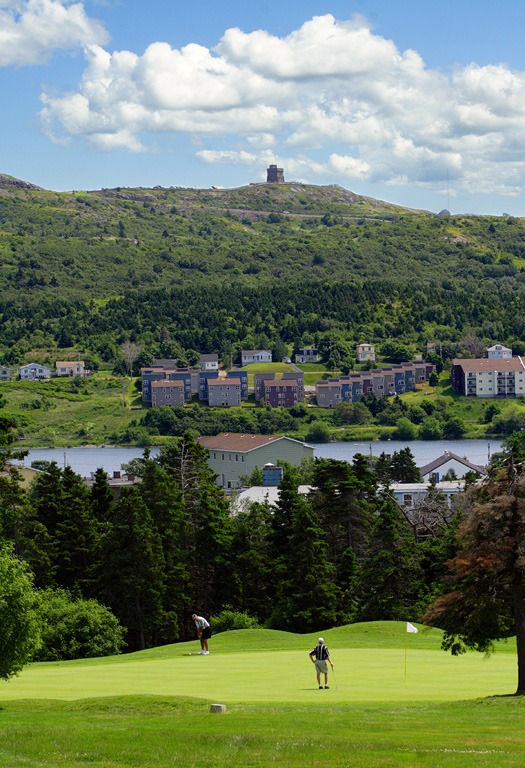
Bally Haly Golf Club

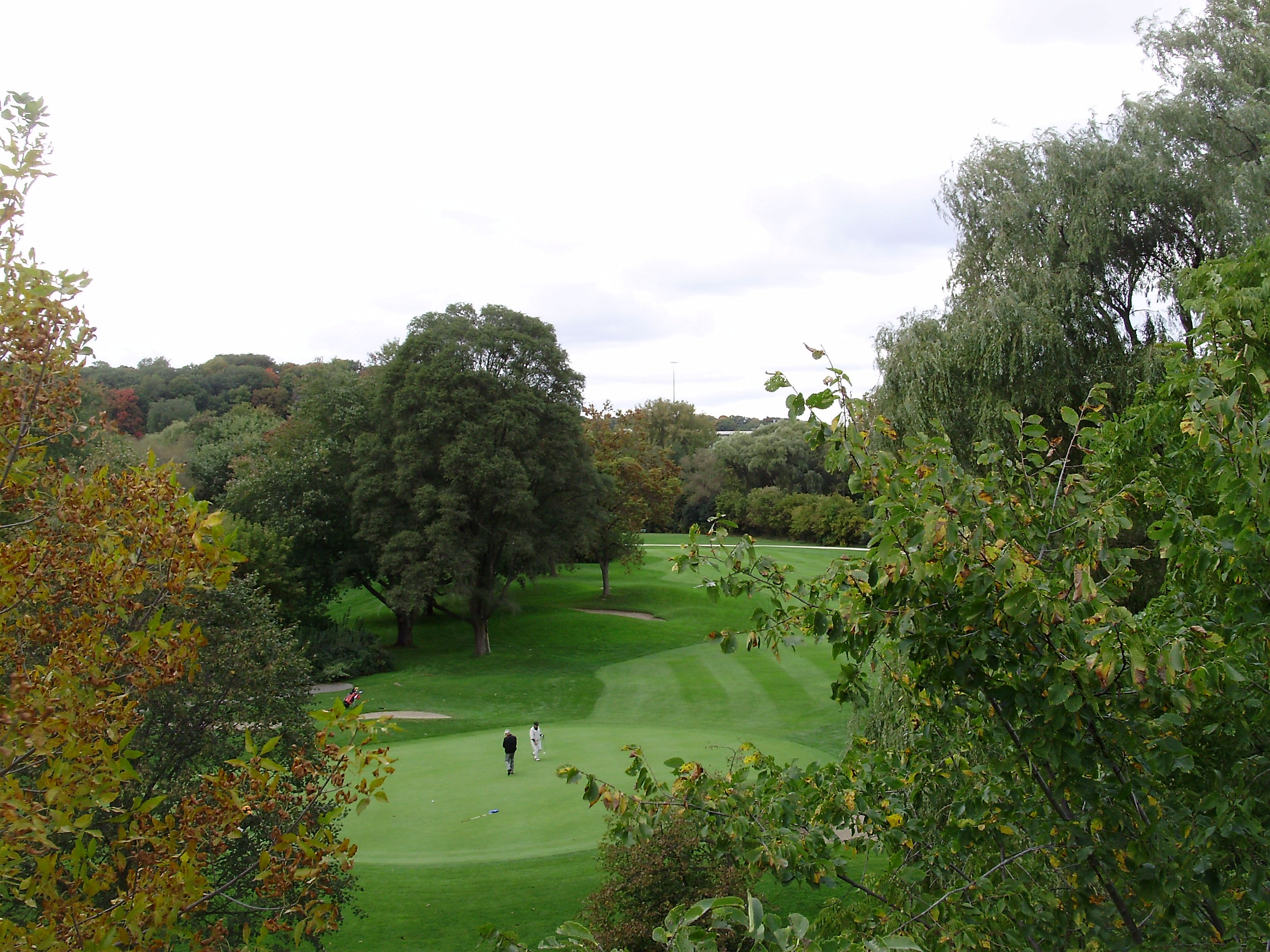
Don Valley golf course

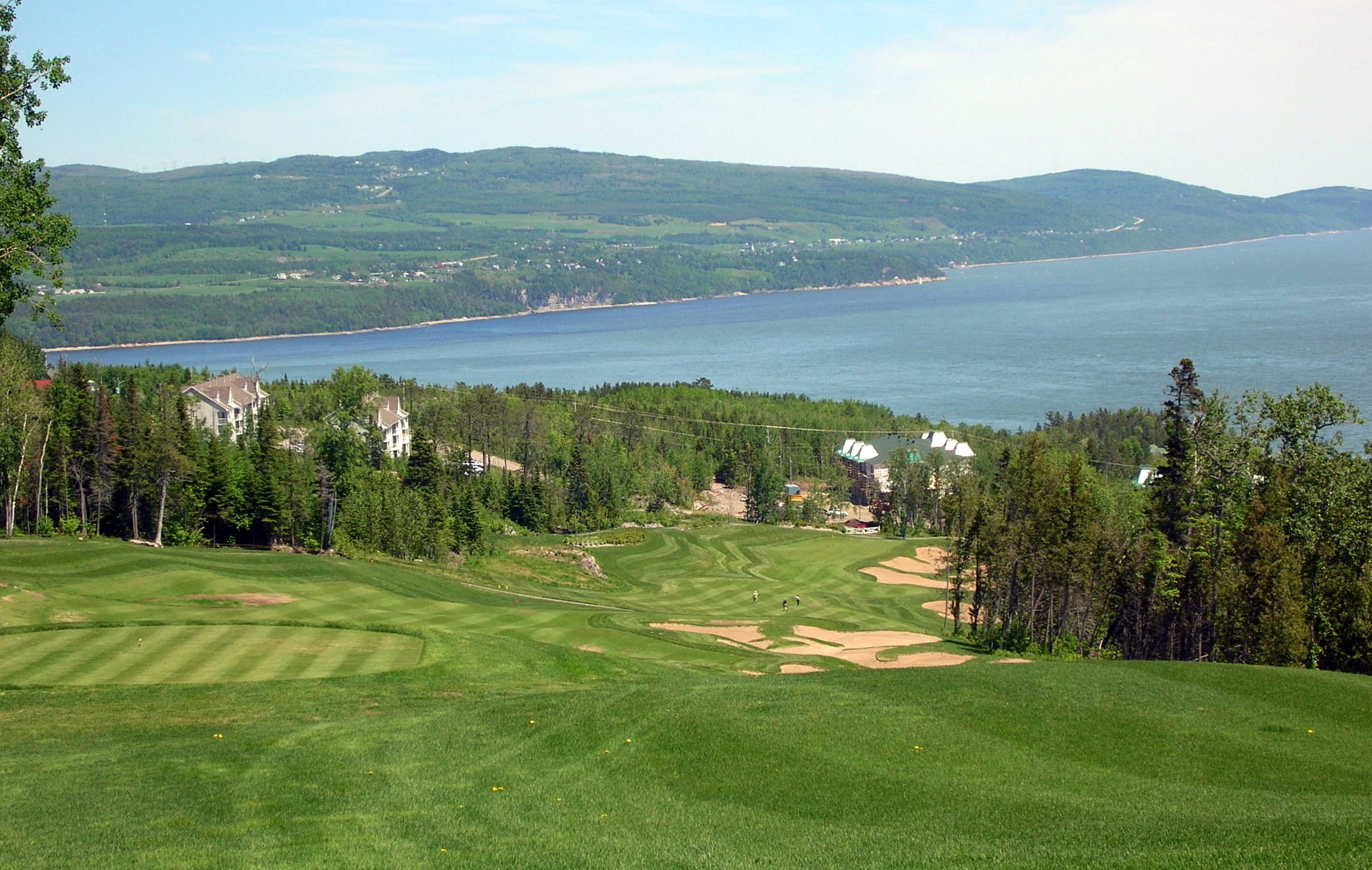
Fairmont Le Manoir Richelieu golf course

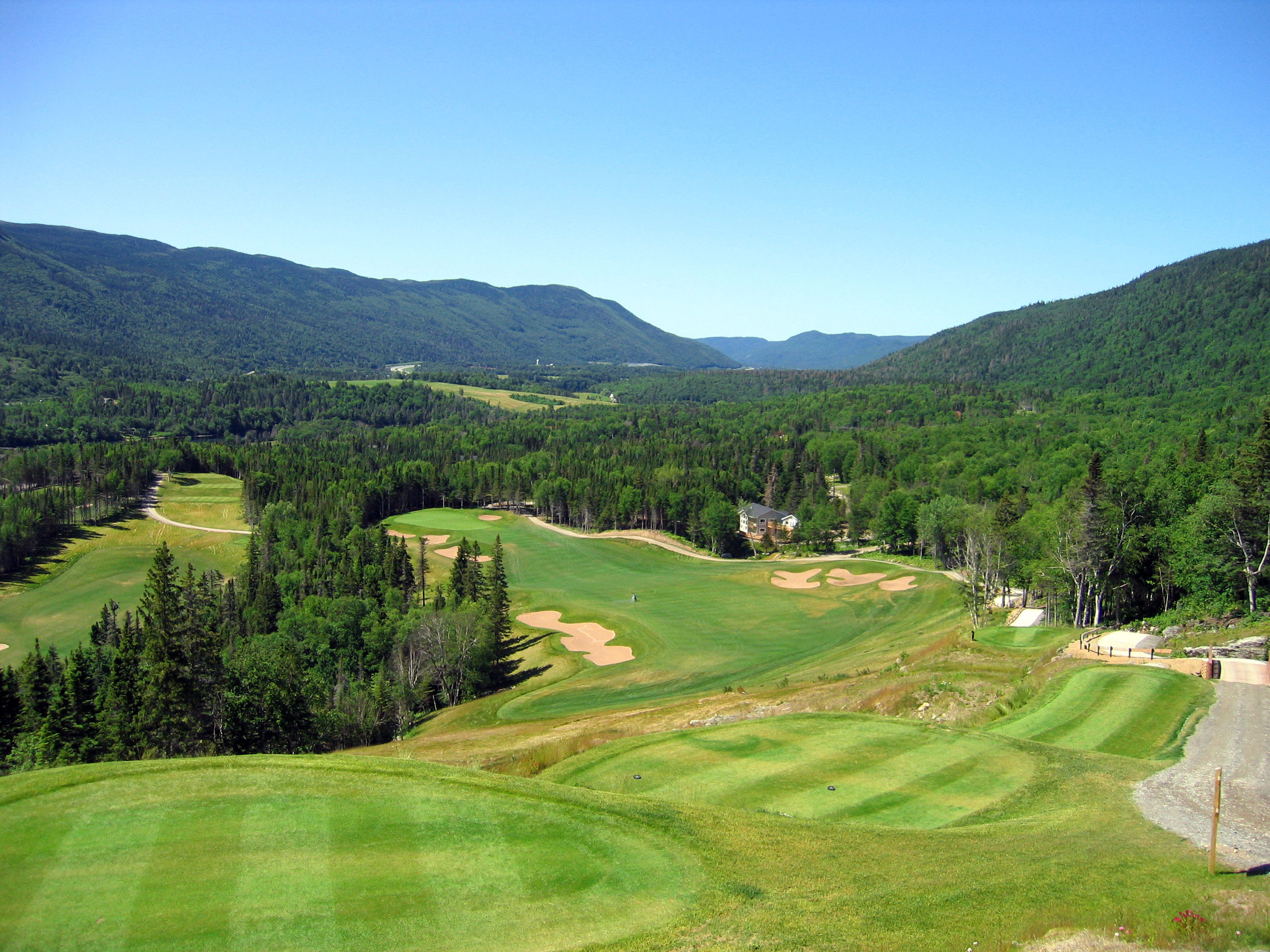
Humber Valley golf club

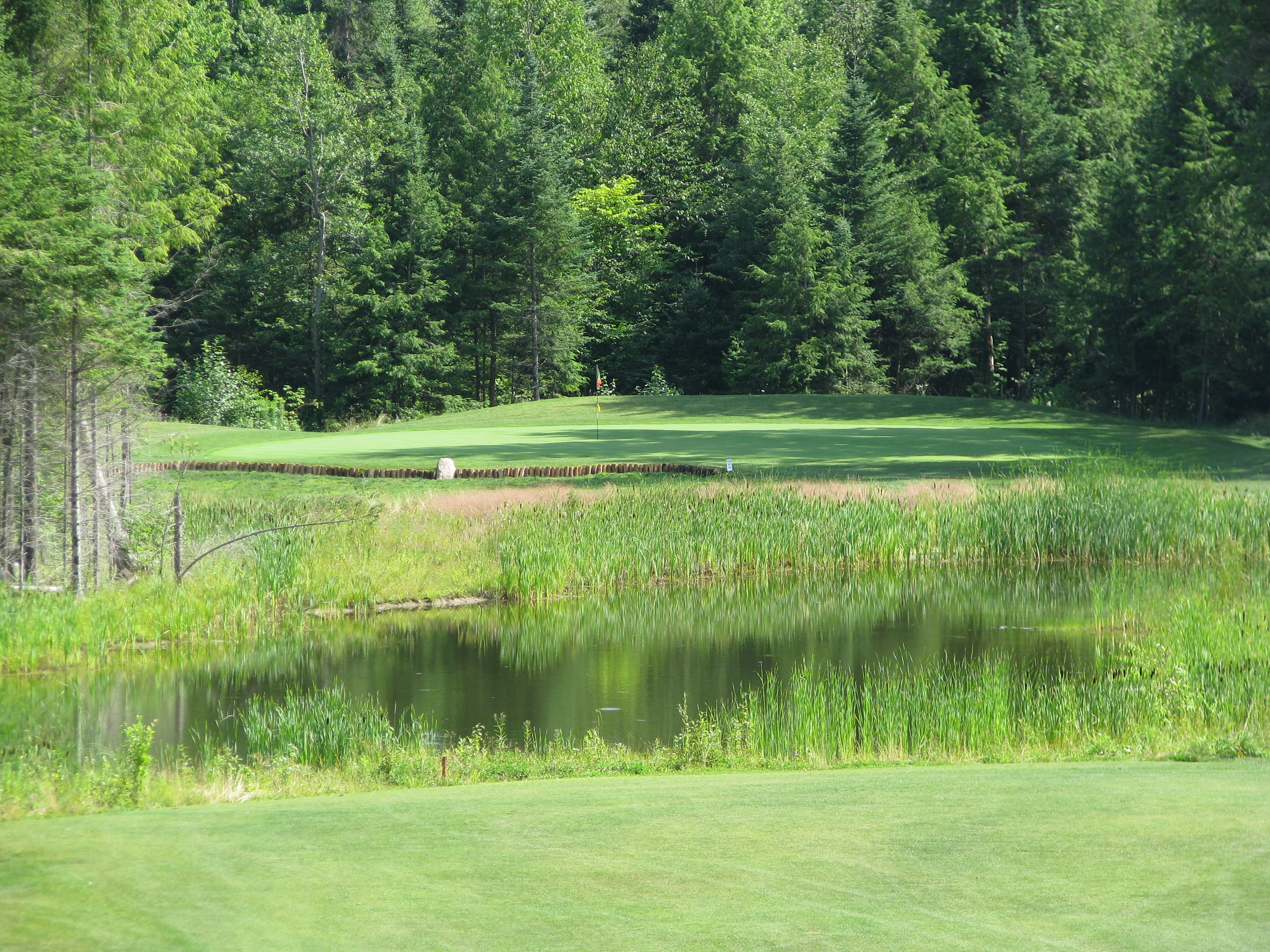
Monck's Landing golf course

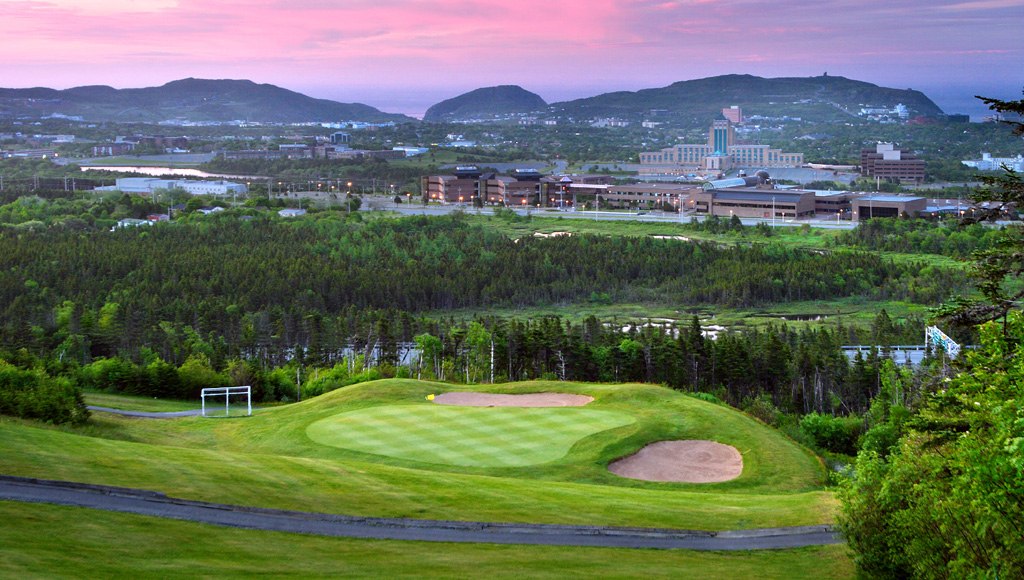
Pippy Park golf course

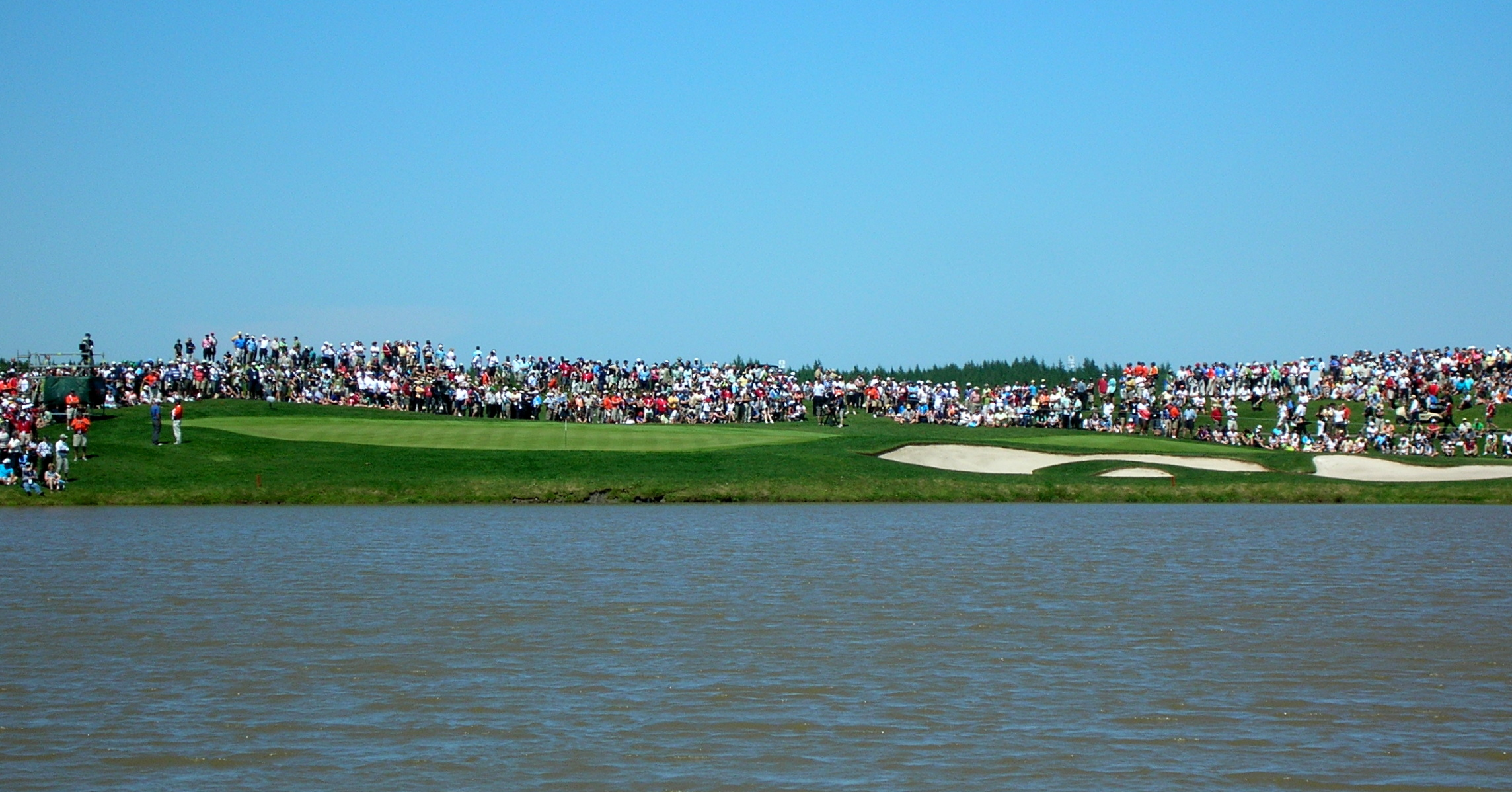
La Tempête Golf Club

The following are incomplete lists of notable golf courses in Canada by province and territory.

== British Columbia ==
The following is an incomplete list of golf courses in British Columbia.

- Bear Mountain Golf Club
- Point Grey Golf & Country Club
- Shaughnessy Golf & Country Club
- Sun Peaks Golf Course
- University Golf Club
- Vancouver Golf Club
- Victoria Golf Club
- Westwood Plateau Golf & Country Club

== Manitoba ==
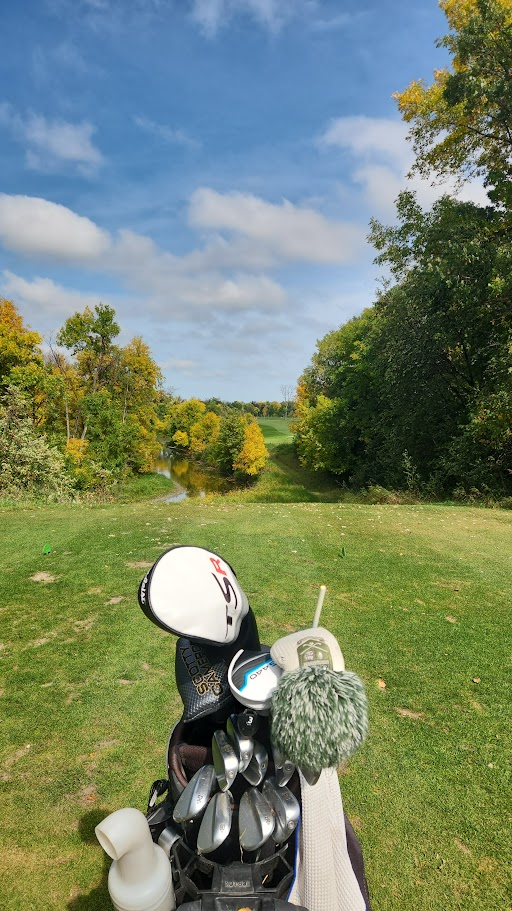
17th tee box at St. Boniface Golf Club

The following is an incomplete list of golf courses in Manitoba.

- Breezy Bend Country Club
- Niakwa Country Club
- Oak Island Golf
- Southwood Golf & Country Club
- St. Boniface Golf Club
- St. Charles Country Club

== Newfoundland and Labrador ==
The following is an incomplete list of golf courses in Newfoundland and Labrador.

- Amaruk Golf Club
- Blomidon Golf & Country Club
- Brookside Golf Resort
- Grand Falls Golf Club
- Grande Meadows Golf Club
- Gros Morne Golf Resort
- Harmon Links
- Humber River Golf Club
- Humber Valley Golf Resort
- Pippy Park Golf Club
- Pitcher's Pond Golf Course
- St. Andrews na Creige Golf Course
- Tamarack Golf Club
- Twin Rivers Golf Course
- The View Golf Resort
- The Wilds at Salmonier River Golf Club

== New Brunswick ==
The following is an incomplete list of golf courses in New Brunswick.

- Country Meadows Golf Club
- Royal Oaks Golf Club

== Northwest Territories ==
The following is an incomplete list of golf courses in the Northwest Territories.

- Yellowknife Golf Club

== Nova Scotia ==
The following is an incomplete list of golf courses in Nova Scotia.

- Cabot Links
- Fox Harb'r Golf Resort & Spa
- Highlands Links
- Yarmouth Golf & Country Club

== Ontario ==
- Angus Glen Golf Club
- Brantford Golf & Country Club
- Cataraqui Golf and Country Club
- Cedar Brae Golf & Country Club
- Essex Golf & Country Club
- Garrison Golf and Curling Club
- Glen Abbey Golf Course
- Hamilton Golf and Country Club
- Horseshoe Resort
- Lake St. George Golf Club
- Lambton Golf and Country Club
- The Links at Monck's Landing Golf Club
- Loyalist Golf and Country Club
- Marshes Golf Club
- Mississaugua Golf & Country Club
- Oakdale Golf & Country Club
- Ottawa Hunt and Golf Club
- Rosedale Golf Club
- Saugeen Golf Club
- Scarboro Golf and Country Club
- Settlers' Ghost Golf Club
- St. George's Golf and Country Club
- Toronto Golf Club
- Toronto Hunt Club
- TPC Toronto at Osprey Valley
- Westmount Golf and Country Club
- Weston Golf and Country Club

== Prince Edward Island ==
The following is a list of golf courses in Prince Edward Island.

- Brudenell River Golf Course
- Dundarave Golf Course
- The Links at Crowbush Cove
- Mill River Golf Course

== Quebec ==
The following is an incomplete list of golf courses in Quebec.

- Country Club of Montreal
- Gray Rocks
- Maisonneuve Park
- Mount Bruno Golf Club
- Rivermead Golf Club
- Royal Montreal Golf Club
- Royal Ottawa Golf Club
- Royal Quebec Golf Club

== Saskatchewan ==
- Biggar & District Regional Park
- Dakota Dunes Golf Links
- Jackfish Lodge Golf and Conference Centre
- Whitesand Regional Park
- York Lake Regional Park
