= Blomidon =

Blomidon may refer to:

- Blomidon, Nova Scotia, Canada
- Cape Blomidon, Nova Scotia, Canada
- Blomidon Provincial Park, Nova Scotia Canada
- Blomidon Golf & Country Club, Newfoundland, Canada
