= Brookside Golf Resort =

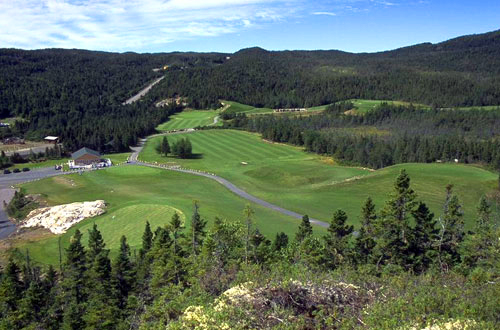
- Interactive map of Brookside Golf Resort
- 48°02′16.35″N 53°48′29.43″W

Club information
- Location: Hatchet Cove, Newfoundland; Canada
- Type: Public
- Tota holes: 9
- Website: www.brooksidegolf.ca
- Par: 72
- Length: 5926 yards
- Course rating: 128

Brookside Golf Resort is a public golf course located in Hatchet Cove, Newfoundland, Canada.

== The Course ==
Brookside Golf Resort is a 9-hole picturesque course that traverses hilly terrain and overlooks Random Sound in Trinity Bay.

== See also ==
- List of golf courses in Newfoundland and Labrador
