= St. Boniface Golf Club =

Golf course in Manitoba

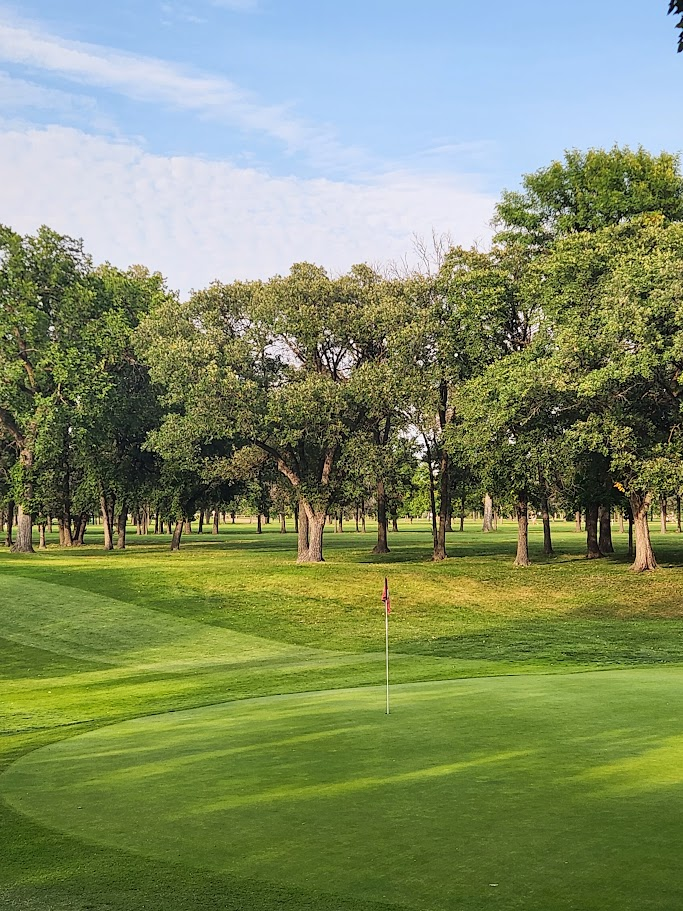
- 14th Green at St. Boniface Golf Club
- Interactive map of St. Boniface Golf Club
- 49.875°N 97.105°W

Club information
- Location: 100 Rue Youville; Winnipeg, Manitoba; Canada
- Established: 1931
- Type: Semi-Private
- Total holes: 18
- Website: www.stbonifacegolfclub.com
- Par: 72
- Length: 6,348 yards (5,805 m)
- Course rating: 71.0
- Slope rating: 130
- Course record: 63 (Jean-Paul Fradette)

St. Boniface Golf Club is a semi-private golf course in St. Boniface neighbourhood Winnipeg, Manitoba, Canada. The 18-hole, par 72 golf course was designed in 1931 as a nine hole course, then expanded to 18 holes in 1941. The course was built along the Seine River on land still owned by the City of Winnipeg and leased to the golf courses ownership.

== History ==
The club opened in 1931 under the presidency of Frank Eastwood. Soon after opening, the club sought to expand to 18 holes, but did not get approval from the city of Winnipeg until 1937. The back nine was opened in August of 1941, but almost immediately shut down at the onset of World War Two.

In 1946, the full course reopened and construction on a clubhouse began. The new clubhouse was opened in October of 1949 and was fully renovated in 2004. The clubhouse contains a restaurant.

From 1980 to 1981, Two-time World Curling Champion and long time CBC broadcaster Don Duguid was elected president of the club. Don was a lifetime member of St. Boniface Golf Club.

St. Boniface Golf Club has hosted several major national and provincial competitions, including the Canadian Women's Amateur championship, the PGA of Manitoba Championship, the PGA of Manitoba Playing Ability Test, and more. Most recently the course is the host of the 2026 Manitoba provincial men's amateur championship.

The current Director of Golf Operations and Head Professional is Steve Wood, who is also the former President of the PGA of Canada and Manitoba's representative on the PGA of Canada's board of directors. The current course superintendent is Craig Campbell.

== Facilities ==
Amenities include a short game practice facility, a virtual golf simulator, a practice putting green, locker rooms, a club storage facility, and outdoor patio bar.

The club is also an established wedding venue and event space. Facilities include the Atrium, Solarium, and an outdoor ceremony site with capacity for 220 people.

== Golf course ==
St. Boniface Golf Club is located next to the Seine River with the second half of the course winding through fairways lined by mature trees.The course has 3 sets of tees ranging from 5700 yards to 6475 yards. The club identifies the 17th hole, a par 5, as its signature hole. The Seine River runs alongside the hole, and there are bunkers.

The course is shorter by modern standards for hosting major events, but the layout remains difficult and players who wish to be successful must be skilled with their wedges and putting. During the 2026 Manitoba Men's Championship, golfers near the top of the leaderboard were not hitting drivers to avoid the large amount of hazards on the course.

== Scorecard ==
Tee	Rating/Slope	1	2	3	4	5	6	7	8	9	Out	10	11	12	13	14	15	16	17	18	In	Total
Par		4	4	4	4	3	4	4	4	5	36	4/5	5	3/4	5	3	4	4	5	3	36/38	72/74
Black	M:71.0 / 130	357	365	379	379	163	332	282	366	520	3,143	441	483	220	516	205	330	325	516	169	3,205	6,348
Black/Green	M:70.4 / 127	357	355	361	379	145	332	282	355	520	3,086	430	483	206	496	185	330	325	504	169	3,128	6,214
Green	M:69.9 / 128 W:75.5 / 131	340	355	368	361	145	326	271	335	497	3,018	430	471	206	496	185	316	319	504	159	3,086	6,104
Green/Silver	M:68.5 / 123 W:74.2 / 129	340	292	320	361	127	326	271	326	444	2,807	430	461	223	476	165	316	319	448	154	2,992	5,799
Silver	M:68.2 / 121 W:73.1 / 128	320	292	320	346	127	317	256	339	444	2,761	418	461	223	476	165	301	312	448	154	2,958	5,719

== See also ==
- List of golf courses in Manitoba
