= Pippy Park =

Park located in the city of St. John's, Newfoundland, Canada

Coordinates: 47°34′57″N 52°44′00″W

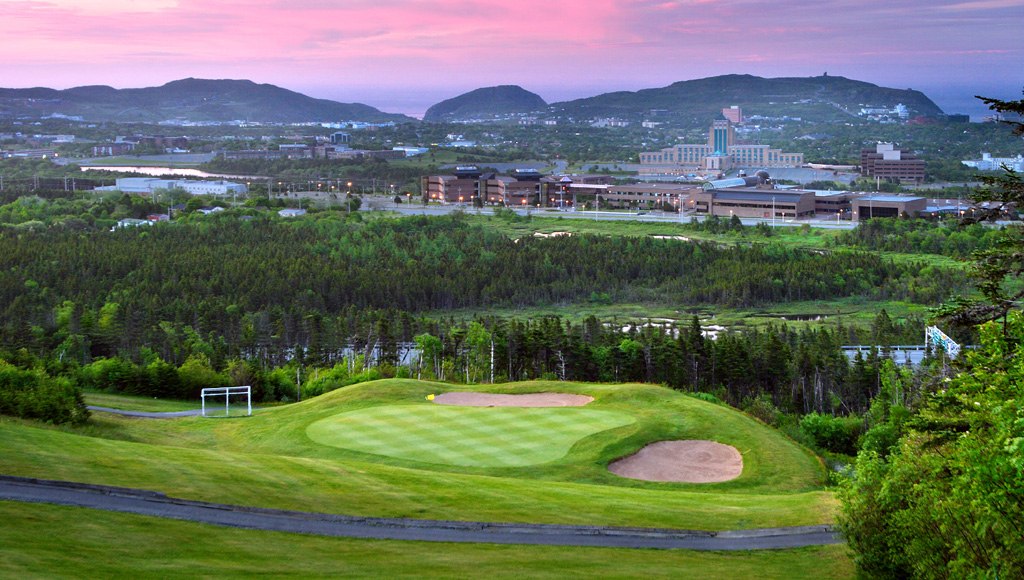
Pippy Park Golf Club

Pippy Park is a 3,400-acre (14 km^{2}) urban park located in the city of St. John's, Newfoundland. The park is a popular camping, hiking and recreational park within the city, and incorporates numerous groomed and wilderness-style hiking/skiing trails, a miniature golf course, a 9-hole and an 18-hole golf course, a driving range, and a public access trailer park with limited tent camping facilities. Trails within the park link to the Grand Concourse walking trails.

Pippy Park incorporates the main campus of Memorial University of Newfoundland and the Memorial University of Newfoundland Botanical Garden at Oxen Pond, as well as the Ridge Road campus of the Marine Institute of Memorial University of Newfoundland and the Ridge Road and Prince Philip Drive campuses of the College of the North Atlantic. The park also includes the Confederation Building complex, which houses the Newfoundland and Labrador House of Assembly and numerous offices of the Provincial Government.

The park is administered by the C. A. Pippy Park Commission, a Crown Corporation of the Province of Newfoundland and Labrador. The eight members of the commission include representatives of the Provincial Government, the University, the City of St. John's, the Pippy family, and landowners and residents within the park boundaries.

Pippy Park is also home to the Fluvarium, an environmental education centre which offers a cross section view of Nagle's Hill Brook. The Fluvarium is not an aquarium in that none of the fish are in captivity - the building offers an underwater view of a natural river. The word Fluvarium comes from the Latin Fluvius (flowing water) and means literally "windows on a stream."
