= St. Andrews na Creige Golf Course =

Privately owned golf course in Newfoundland, Canada

Codroy Valley Golf Club
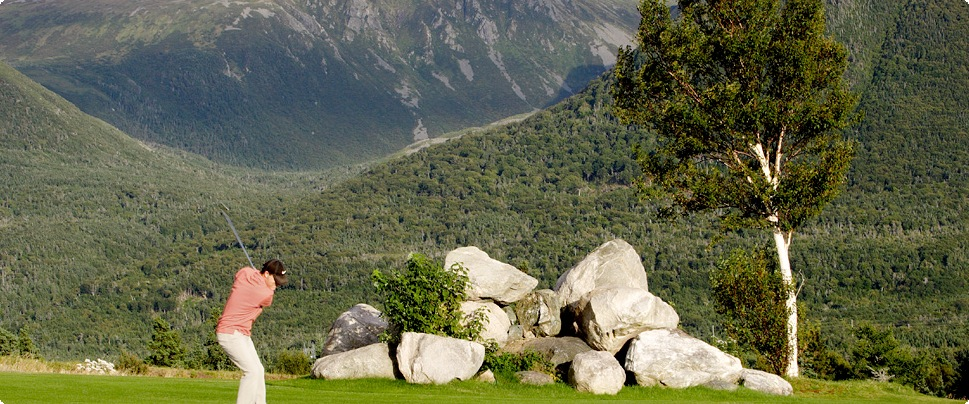
- Interactive map of Codroy Valley Golf Club
- 47°47′36.01″N 59°14′46.06″W

Club information
- Location: St. Andrew's, Newfoundland, Canada
- Established: 2000
- Type: Private
- Tota holes: 9
- Designed by: Terry Burns
- Par: 35
- Length: 2915

Codroy Valley Golf Club (formerly St. Andrews na Creige) is a privately owned golf course located in St. Andrew's, Newfoundland, Canada.

== History ==
Codroy Valley Golf Club (formerly St. Andrews Na Creige) is a 9-hole (par 35) course located at the edge of the Long Range Mountains in the Codroy Valley of western Newfoundland. The course has plans to add an additional 9-holes and a chalet development.

The property was originally deeded to current owner Pat MacIsaac's great grandfather, Captain John MacIsaac by Queen Victoria in 1889.

== See also ==
- List of golf courses in Newfoundland and Labrador
