= The View Golf Resort =

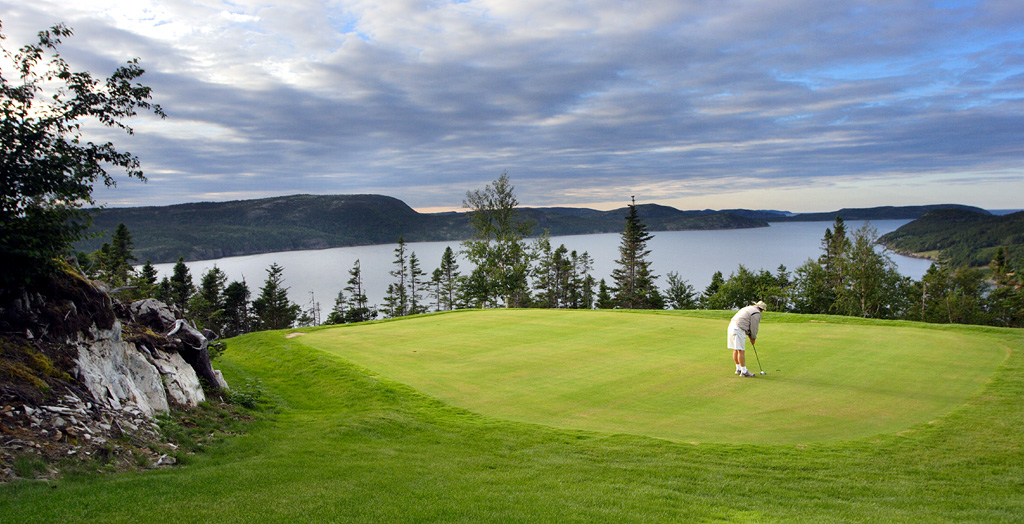
- Ocean View from Putting Green
- Interactive map of The View Golf Resort
- 48°25′46.30″N 53°34′42.0″W

Club information
- Location: Princeton, Newfoundland, Canada
- Owner: Barrey Stuber, Linda Stuber, Trevor Stuber, Travis Stuber
- Tota holes: 9
- Website: www.theviewgolfresort.com
- Par: 34
- Length: 2250 yards

The View, is a public golf course located near the community of Princeton, Newfoundland, Canada. The resort contains a 9-hole par 34 executive style course that measures 2250 yards from the blue tees and 1920 yards from the red tees.

== See also ==
- List of golf courses in Newfoundland and Labrador
