= TPC Toronto at Osprey Valley =

Tournament Players Club golf facility in Caledon, Ontario, Canada

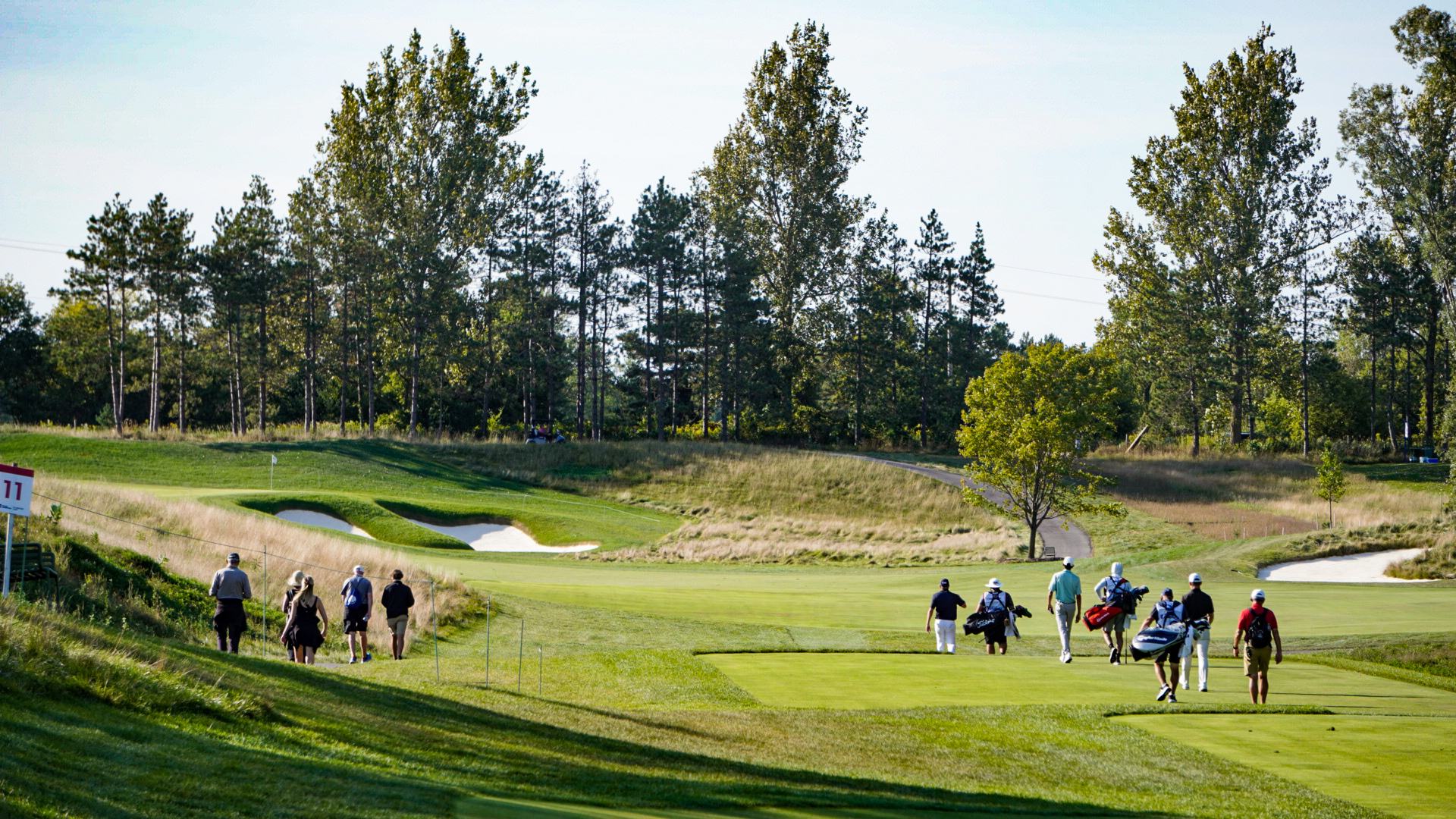
- The 12th hole of the North course during the Fortinet Cup Championship, a PGA Tour Americas event, in 2024
- Interactive map of TPC Toronto at Osprey Valley
- 43°50′24.9″N 80°02′28.8″W

Club information
- Established: 1992
- Total holes: 54
- Tournaments: RBC Canadian Open
- Website: ospreyvalley.com

North
- Designed by: Doug Carrick
- Par: 72 (Championship Par 70)
- Length: 7,445 yards (6,808 m)

Heathlands
- Designed by: Doug Carrick
- Par: 71
- Length: 6,810 yards (6,230 m)

Hoot
- Designed by: Doug Carrick
- Par: 72
- Length: 7,134 yards (6,523 m)

TPC Toronto at Osprey Valley is a golf course in the province of Ontario, Canada, located in Caledon, a town one hour north of Toronto. There are three courses (North, Hoot, Heathlands) ranked among the Top 100 in Canada, each designed by Canadian architect Doug Carrick. In 2024, it was announced the North course would host the 2025 RBC Canadian Open.

The facility has hosted PGA Tour Americas tournaments since 2018, when it was announced as the first Canadian facility to join the Tournament Players Club.

== History ==
Known simply as Osprey Valley until joining the TPC Network in 2018, the facility opened in 1992 with the Heathlands course, a links-inspired design featuring fescue-covered mounds and pot bunkers that established Doug Carrick as a prominent Canadian architect. The wasteland-style Hoot and parkland-style Toot (now named North) courses were added in 2001, once again designed by Carrick.

On August 28, 2018, the PGA Tour announced that Osprey Valley had joined the Tournament Players Club, the first Canadian facility to do so. Shortly after, plans were revealed to expand facilities to include new clubhouses, on-site accommodations and amenities to appeal to guests from outside the Greater Toronto Area.

In 2022, it was announced that the facility would become home to Golf Canada's new headquarters, along with a publicly accessible 18-hole community putting course.

On May 21, 2024, it was announced that the North course would play host to the 2025 RBC Canadian Open, becoming the 38th course in the event's 121-year history to host Canada's national open. In 2026 TPC Toronto hosted the Canadian Open for the second time and was announced as the tournament's 2027 venue.

== Heathlands course ==
The facility's first course, the Heathlands opened was built in 1991 and opened in 1992. Despite the course being built on a relatively flat piece of farmland, Carrick aimed to recreate visual elements of seaside links courses including "gnarly fescue covered mounds, imposing pot bunkers and intricately contoured greens." The original amenities were modest, consisting of a trailer in a gravel parking lot. The course celebrated its 25th anniversary in 2017, with Carrick on hand to say it has been received with positive feedback throughout his career: "I’d have to say that of all the courses I’ve designed, I probably get the most compliments about the Heathlands course."

== Hoot course ==
Opened in 2001, the Hoot course was inspired by Pine Valley, with expansive sandy waste areas and pine barrens meant to evoke wasteland-style courses of the eastern seaboard and Carolinas. Carrick's choice for the Hoot's aesthetics and playing characteristics were influenced by a desire to create a distinctive profile separate from property's other courses, with its rugged look juxtaposing the links-inspired Heathlands and lush, parkland-stye North.

== North course ==
Initially named Toot, the North course was designed to be a visually stunning, highly playable offering for golfers of all abilities. While ranked highly among Canada's best public courses, its identity as a wide, parkland-style course offered little definition in character compared to the property's Hoot and Heathlands layouts. With hopes of hosting a future Canadian Open in mind, the facility announced plans in 2023 to renovate the course under the guidance of architect Ian Andrew, who worked as an associate of Carrick during construction of all three of the property's courses. Andrew's focus for the project included placing greater emphasis on tee-to-green play, lengthening of holes and strategic placement of bunkers and other hazards to enhance the course's ability to test the world's best players in championship play.

== Tournaments held ==
- Canadian Open, 2025-2026
- Osprey Valley Open (PGA Tour Americas) from 2018-2023; 2025-2026
- Fortinet Cup Championship (PGA Tour Americas) 2024
- PGA Women's Championship of Canada (PGA of Canada)
- PGA Assistants' Championship of Canada (PGA of Canada)
