= Pitcher's Pond Golf Course =

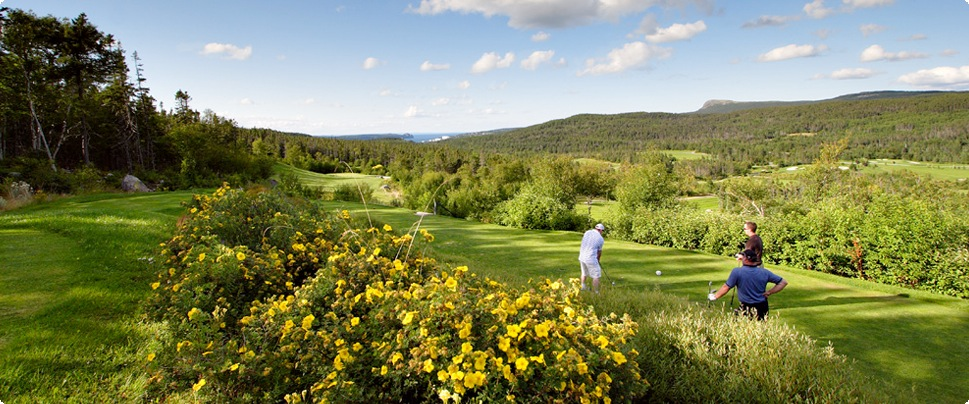
- Interactive map of Pitcher's Pond Golf Course
- 47°41′25.01″N 53°27′46.38″W

Club information
- Location: Whiteway, Newfoundland, Canada
- Established: 2005
- Type: Public
- Tota holes: 9
- Website: www.pitcherspondgolf.com
- Designed by: Graham Cooke
- Par: 36
- Length: 3400 yards

Pitcher's Pond Golf Course is a public golf course located on the Avalon Peninsula in Whiteway, Newfoundland, Canada.

== History ==
Pitcher's Pond comprises a 9-hole course that is laid out on the hills overlooking Trinity Bay and adjacent to Pitcher's Pond. The course was opened in 2005, making it one of Newfoundland's recent golf courses.

== See also ==
- List of golf courses in Newfoundland and Labrador
