= Tamarack Golf Club =

Golf course in Canada

- Interactive map of Tamarack Golf Club
- 52°54′23.84″N 66°59′45.31″W

Club information
- Location: Labrador City, Newfoundland and Labrador, Canada
- Type: Public
- Total holes: 18
- Website: www.tamarackgolfclub.ca
- Par: 72
- Length: 6106 yards
- Course rating: 119
- Course record: 66 Mitchell Normore

Tamarack Golf Club is a public 18-hole golf course on the shore of Duley Lake in Labrador City, Newfoundland and Labrador, Canada. It was established in 1968.

== See also ==
- List of golf courses in Newfoundland and Labrador
