= The Wilds at Salmonier River Golf Club =

Public golf course in St. Catherine's, Newfoundland, Canada

The Wilds at Salmonier River
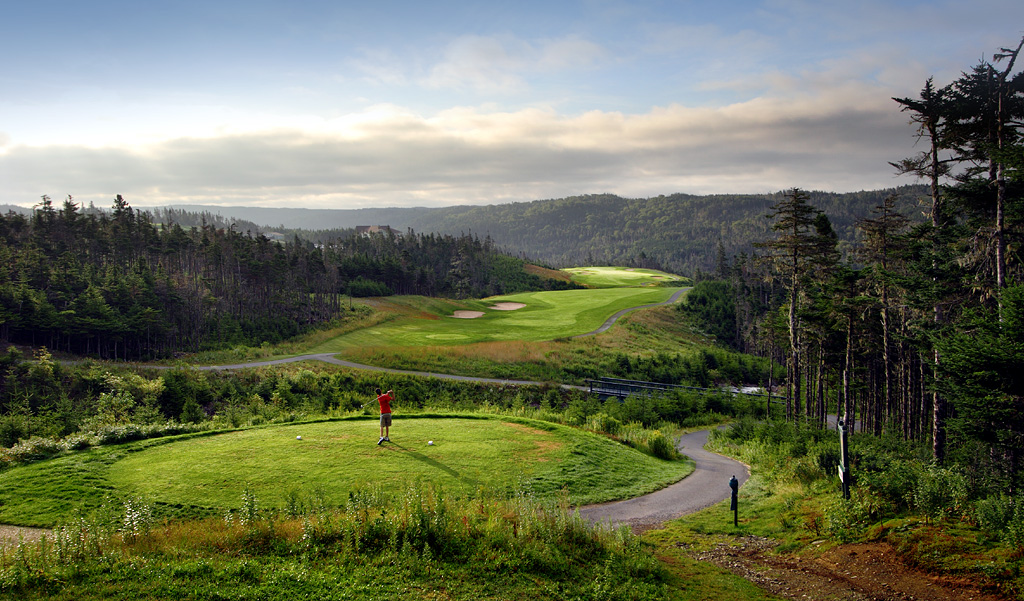
- Interactive map of The Wilds at Salmonier River
- 47°13′07.61″N 53°19′47.36″W

Club information
- Location: St. Catherine's, Newfoundland, Canada
- Type: Public
- Tota holes: 18
- Website: www.thewilds.ca
- Par: 72
- Length: 6750 yards

The Wilds at Salmonier River, is a public golf course located north of the community of St. Catherine's, Newfoundland, Canada. It was founded by Edwin Drover.

== The Course ==
The Wilds at Salmonier River is rated among the most challenging 18-hole championship courses in Newfoundland. Each hole has a distinctive character with elevated tees, greens and undulating fairways interspersed with natural wetlands, brooks, and ponds. The course is located near Salmonier Nature Park, the Avalon Wilderness Reserve and the Salmonier River, a renowned salmon river that flows below the resort's hotel.

== See also ==
- List of golf courses in Newfoundland and Labrador
