= Humber River Golf Club =

Canadian public golf course

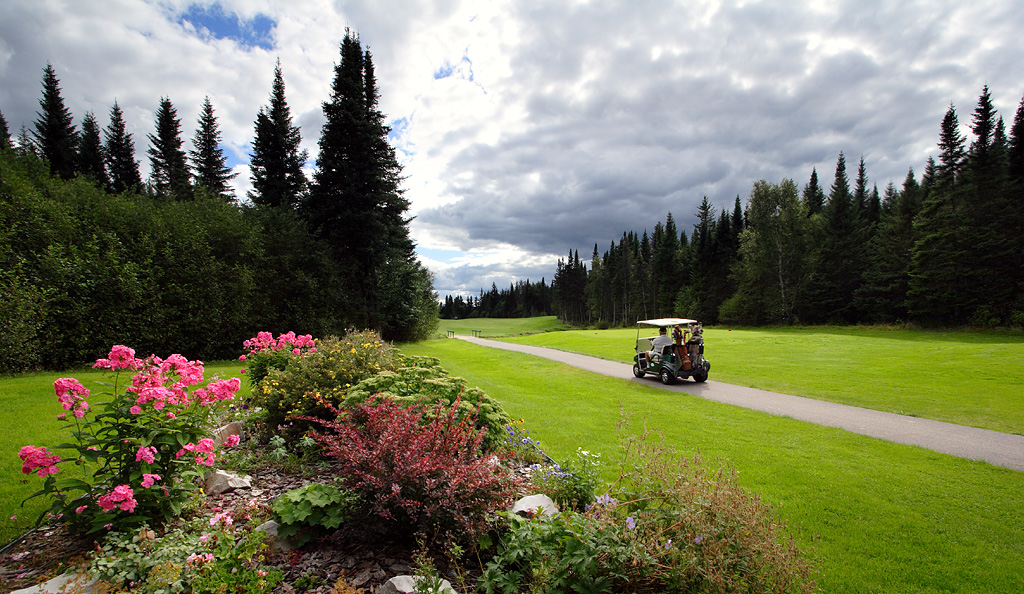
- Interactive map of Humber River Golf Club
- 49°12′20.29″N 57°24′59.14″W

Club information
- Location: Deer Lake, Newfoundland, Canada
- Tota holes: 9
- Par: 36
- Length: 3106 yards
- Course rating: 91.4

The Humber River Golf Resort is a public golf course located in western Newfoundland, near the town of Deer Lake, Canada.

== The Course ==
Named after the Humber River that borders the course, this is just a 9-hole course. The spacious clubhouse offers views of the fourth and ninth greens from the balcony. Each is hole is completely separate, with narrow fairways lined with spruce and fir trees. The lush greens were designed with subtle undulations and are surrounded by strategically placed sand traps.

== See also ==
- List of golf courses in Newfoundland and Labrador
