= Yellowknife Golf Club =

Golf course in Yellowknife, Northwest Territories

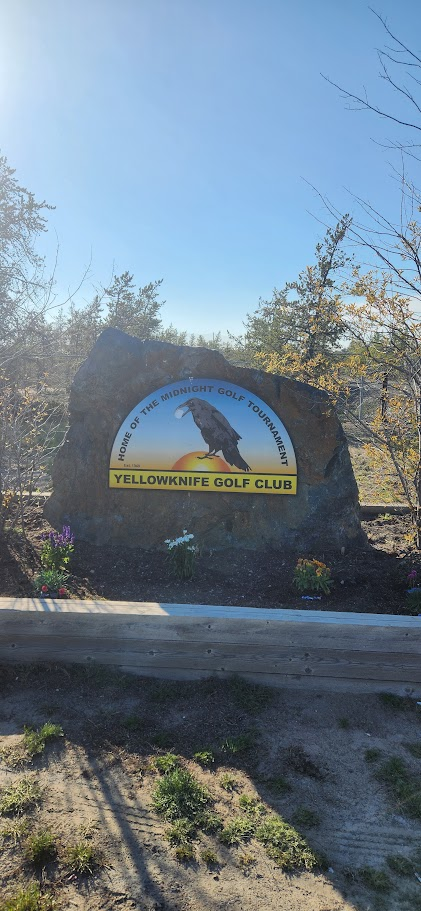
- Sign at the entrance of the Yellowknife Golf Club
- Interactive map of Yellowknife Golf Club
- 62.476°N 114.472°W

Club information
- Location: 5010 49 St. Yellowknife, Northwest Territories X1A 3R7
- Established: 1948
- Type: Public
- Total holes: 18
- Tournaments: The annual Midnight Classic
- Website: https://yellowknifegolf.com/
- Designed by: Stanley Thompson
- Par: 72
- Length: 6,391 yards (5,844 m)
- Course rating: 70.3
- Slope rating: 116

The Yellowknife Golf Club was founded in 1948 by a small group of locals as the towns mining economy was expanding. At the time of its opening it was the northern most golf course in the world. The course is unique for its sand fairways and oiled greens. Golfers traditionally carry a small piece of artificial turf and place it beneath their ball before hitting from the fairways.

== History ==
Founded in 1948, the club's original members had to improvise achieve the feel of a normal golf club despite the conditions of the region. To make a golf course feel like a club, locals transported the fuselage of a crashed DC-3 aircraft to the course and used it as the club's first clubhouse.

For the clubs first 45 years, it played as a nine holes. Beginning in 1990, the course installed some artificial greens as a test, before major renovations in 1995 led to artificial greens on every hole and the addition of a second nine holes to make a full 18 hole golf course. The back nine of the course is unique, containing hole 12 which runs a long the shores of Yellowknife’s Long Lake, creating a view that is pictured on the courses scorecard. Hole 14 also has a unique feature of its tee-box being located on the patio of the courses clubhouse, meaning golfers enjoying a meal before or after their round create a gallery for those currently playing the hole.

In 2004, the club gained some international attention when a Canadian Air Force CF-18 accidentally dropped an AIM-7 Sparrow missile onto the driving range. The missile was live, but safetied when it was dropped, but military officials needed to shut down the golf course to secure and subsequently destroy the remnants. Some artifacts of the damage remain on the driving range to this day.

Today, the golf club is the annual host the Northwest Territories' Special Olympics golf tournament. The club is also the Northwest Territories' host for a regional qualifier of the Canadian PGA Scramble tournament.

== Amenities ==
The Yellowknife Golf Club currently operates:

- An 18-hole championship golf course
- a full sized, mats only driving range
- A modern clubhouse with a restaurant and bar
- A standard pro shop
- Tournament and event space facilities
- Online tee-time booking services

== The Midnight Classic ==
The Midnight Classic is held annually at the Yellowknife Golf Club, usually on the weekend closest to the Summer Solstice. The event attracts as many as 400 golfers each year to participate. The tournament is as old as the golf course itself, starting in 1948.

The event was originally an endurance style golf tournament, with players attempting to play as long as they could with the regions extended daylight. In 1970, a member named Sandy Hutchinson played a tournament record 171 holes in 33.5 hours. The endurance style of the original tournament fit the local community well, where early residents who were miners, bush pilots, and other northern jobs that demanded long hours were used to the physical toll.

Today, the tournament is similar to other modern golf events with multiple competitive formats and standard stroke play golf.

== Scorecard ==
Tee	Rating/Slope	1	2	3	4	5	6	7	8	9	Out	10	11	12	13	14	15	16	17	18	In	Total
Par		4	4	4	4	4	3	4	4	5	36	4	3	5	4	3	4	4	4	5	36	72
Blue	M:70.3 / 116 W:76.3 / 129	391	360	283	350	387	183	365	381	500	3,200	356	165	514	386	150	382	407	364	467	3,191	6,391
White	M:69.5 / 114 W:75.8 / 127	391	360	283	350	387	183	365	323	500	3,142	356	165	514	356	150	382	347	364	467	3,101	6,243
Red	M:65.5 / 114 W:75.8 / 116	328	304	283	307	338	135	296	291	411	2,693	335	133	410	331	150	346	284	339	401	2,729	5,422
Yellow	M:60.9 / 92 W:63.9 / 97	281	200	209	225	256	97	237	180	327	2,012	302	102	342	261	150	310	156	247	336	2,206	4,218

== See also ==
- List of golf courses in Canada
