= Mill River Golf Course =

Golf course

Coordinates: 46°44′33″N 64°09′56″W

Mill River Golf Course is a golf course located in O'Leary, Prince Edward Island. The course was opened in 1971 and was rated in the Top 100 Public Courses in Canada by The Globe and Mail. The course was originally designed by Canadian architect Robbie Robinson. Grahame Cooke redesigned 6 holes in 1996.

Mill River has hosted the 1989 Canadian Junior Boys National, the 1994 Canadian Women's Amateur, the 1996 duMaurier ladies Professional Event, the 1997 Montclair Classic Canadian PGA Tour Event, the 2000 McDonald's Canadian PGA Tour Event, the 2004 Canadian Junior Girls National and is the home of The Golf Channel's The Big Break Prince Edward Island.

== See also ==
- List of golf courses in Prince Edward Island
