= Twin Rivers Golf Course =

Terra Nova Golf Resort
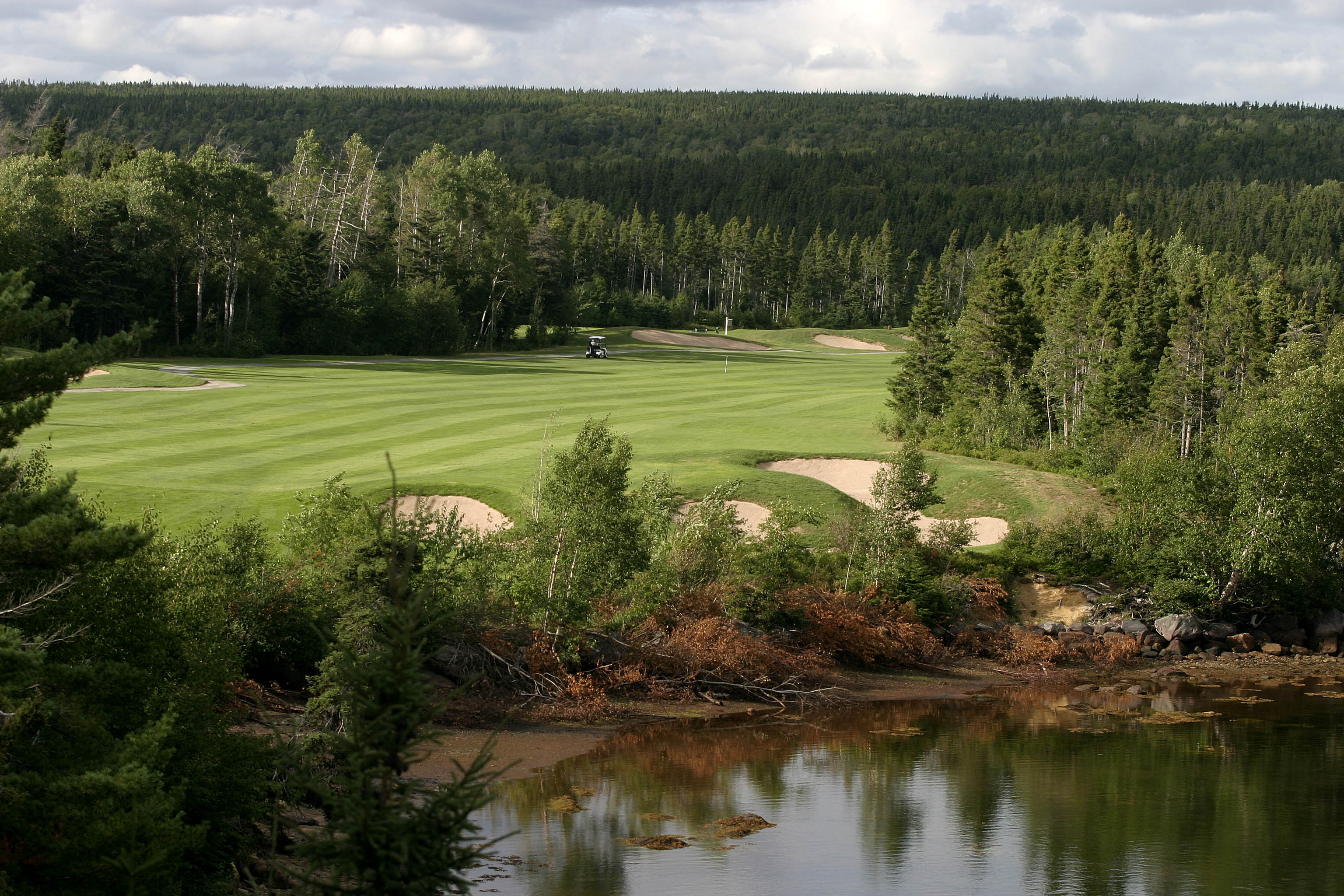
- Interactive map of Terra Nova Golf Resort
- 48°23′20.70″N 54°12′01.70″W

Club information
- Location: Terra Nova National Park, Newfoundland, Canada
- Established: 1984
- Owner: Sports Villas Resorts Inc.
- Operator: Sports Villas Resorts Inc.
- Tota holes: 18
- Website: www.terranovagolf.com/golf-tr.php

Twin Rivers
- Designed by: Robbie Robinson and Doug Carrick
- Par: 72
- Length: 6546 yards
- Course rating: 74.3

Eagle Creek
- Designed by: Robert Walsh
- Par: 35
- Length: 2,593 yards

Twin Rivers Golf Course, is a public golf course located near the village of Port Blandford in Newfoundland, Canada. It is part of the Terra Nova Golf Resort located in Terra Nova National Park.

== History ==
Twin Rivers Course opened in 1984 as a nine-hole public course in Terra Nova National Park. Robbie Robinson designed the original nine holes, while Doug Carrick designed the second nine holes, which opened in 1991. In 1993, Sports Villas Resorts Inc. began operating the Twin Rivers course and named the hotel and golf course property as the Terra Nova Park Lodge & Golf Course, renamed Terra Nova Golf Resort in 2001.

A majority of the course, 17 holes of the Twin Rivers Golf Course operates on land owned by Parks Canada. The course was leased to the Terra Nova resort with an initial lease period lasting from 1990 and was scheduled to expire in 2031.

== The course ==
Twin Rivers Golf Course was ranked by Golf Digest as one of the top ten courses in Atlantic Canada in 2002.

== See also ==
- List of golf courses in Newfoundland and Labrador
