= Grand Falls Golf Club =

Golf course in Grand Falls-Windsor

- Interactive map of Grand Falls Golf Club
- 48°56′16.05″N 55°43′19.53″W

Club information
- Location: Grand Falls-Windsor, Newfoundland and Labrador, Canada
- Established: 1924
- Type: Public
- Tota holes: 18
- Website: www.grandfallsgolf.com
- Designed by: Graham Cooke
- Par: 71
- Length: 5857 yards
- Slope rating: 125

Grand Falls Golf Club is a public golf course located in Grand Falls-Windsor, Newfoundland and Labrador, Canada.

== History ==
In 1905, the Anglo-Newfoundland Development Company, as part of the development of the Grand Falls paper mill, cleared land for farming at the intersection of the Exploits River and Rushy Pond Brook. In 1924 some local enthusiasts developed the land into a 6-hole golf course. Soon thereafter it became a 9-hole facility and remained so until 2004 when Graham Cooke's 9-hole addition was added on the opposite side of Rushy Pond Brook.

== See also ==
- List of golf courses in Newfoundland and Labrador
