= Amaruk Golf Club =

Coordinates: 53°18′07.24″N 60°22′24.65″W

- Interactive map of Amaruk Golf Club

Club information
- Location: Goose Bay, Labrador, Canada
- Type: Public
- Tota holes: 9
- Website: theamarukgolfclub.ca
- Par: 35
- Length: 3025 yards
- Course rating: 128

Amaruk Golf Club is a public golf course located in Happy Valley–Goose Bay, Newfoundland and Labrador, Canada. A 9-hole golf course, it was constructed in the 1950s to serve American servicemen stationed at Goose Air Force Base and British servicemen stationed at RAFU Goose Bay.

== See also ==
- List of golf courses in Newfoundland and Labrador
