= Gros Morne Golf Resort =

Coordinates: 49°52′49″N 57°45′53″W

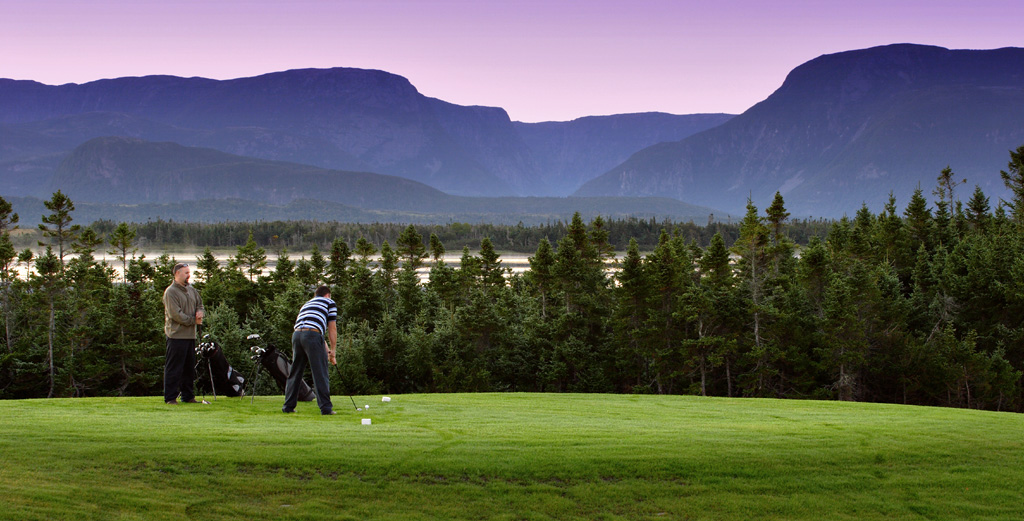
- Interactive map of Gros Morne Golf Resort

Club information
- Location: Gros Morne National Park, Newfoundland, Canada
- Established: 2005
- Tota holes: 18
- Website: grosmorneresort.com
- Par: 72

Gros Morne Golf Resort, is a public golf course located near the town of St. Paul's on the Great Northern Peninsula in Newfoundland, Canada.

== History ==
Located adjacent to the northern part of Gros Morne National Park, Gros Morne Resort is a full service resort complete with conference facilities. The resort opened in 2005 with a 9-hole course and was developed into a full 18-hole course in 2010. The Gros Morne Resort experienced a tragic fire on December 20, 2011 destroying the full motel section of the resort.

== See also ==
- List of golf courses in Newfoundland and Labrador
