= Loyalist Golf and Country Club =

Coordinates: 44.18992°N 76.78661°W

Loyalist Golf and Country Club is a Ted Baker-designed semi-private golf course, located in Bath, Ontario, Canada, just west of Kingston, Ontario. It plays as a par 72, with 5 sets of tee blocks, and yardages ranging from 5,038 to 6,625 yards.

== Tournaments ==
Loyalist Golf Club has been the site of several major provincial and local events, including the 2011 Ontario Senior Men's Amateur, the 2010 Ontario Women's Mid-Amateur, the 2009 Ontario Men's Mid-Amateur, the 2008 GAO Senior Women's Amateur, and the 2012 Women's Amateur championships. In 2014, it hosted The Great Waterway Classic, an event on the PGA Tour Canada. In 2016, the club hosted the Ontario Junior Girls Golf Championship.

=== CN Future Links championship ===
The CN Future Links championship was held at Loyalist, May 24 - 27, 2012. Anna Kim of Toronto and Matt Williams of Calgary captured their respective Junior Girls and Junior Boys titles. Williams finished with a 6-under par round of 66, for a tournament total of 3-under 213. Local favourites Josh Whalen of Napanee, and Austin James of Bath finished in a tie for fourth with a 1-over par scores of 217.

=== The Loyalist Cup ===
Each year, since the inaugural event in 2000, the club holds the Loyalist Cup tournament, a team match-play competition, using a format similar to the Ryder Cup.
