= Pippy Park Golf Club =

Pippy Park
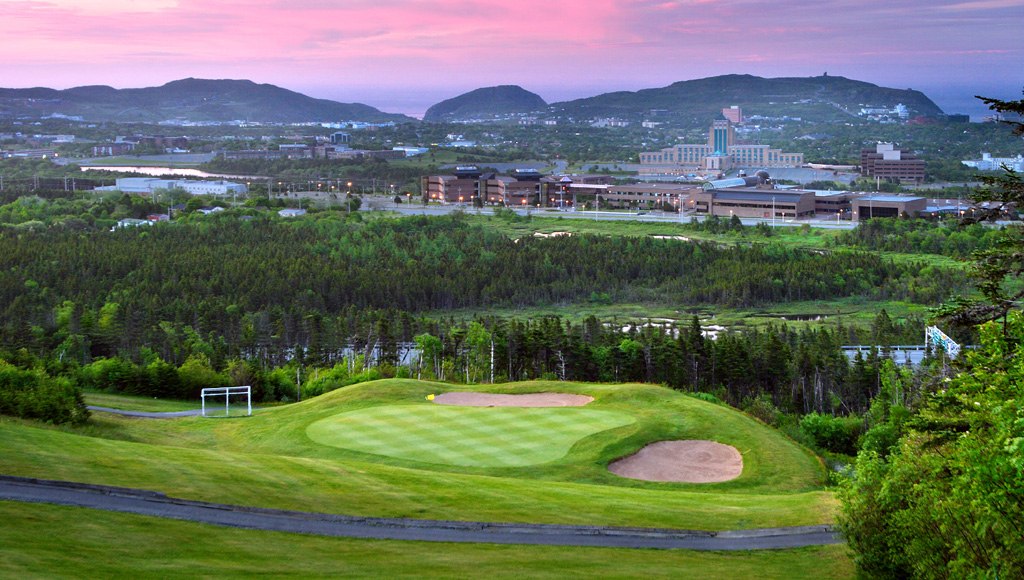
- Interactive map of Pippy Park
- 47°35′22.93″N 52°44′52.78″W

Club information
- Location: St. John's, Newfoundland, Canada
- Tota holes: 27
- Tournaments: Canadian Pro Tour; Canadian Junior and Juvenile Nationals; Canadian Ladies Nationals

Admiral's Green
- Designed by: Graham Cooke
- Par: 71
- Length: 6381 yards
- Course rating: 129

Captain's Hill
- Designed by: Graham Cooke
- Par: 35
- Length: 3047 yards
- Course rating: 123

Pippy Park Golf Club, is a public golf course located in St. John's, Newfoundland, Canada. The facility contains two courses: Admiral's Green is an 18-hole championship course and Captain's Hill is a 9-hole course.

== See also ==
- List of golf courses in Newfoundland and Labrador
