= Saugeen Golf Club =

Golf club in Ontario, Canada

Coordinates: 44.4695°N 81.3509°W

The Saugeen Golf Club is located between the tourist towns of Southampton and Port Elgin in Bruce County, Ontario, Canada, situated on Lake Huron. The club was founded in 1925 and consists of 27 holes, split into three separate nine-hole courses known as Legacy, Sunrise and Sunset.

== History ==
Charles Bell, Herbert Stevens, Joseph Houde, Logie Foster, and Dr. Clifford Beyles founded the Saugeen Golf Club in 1925. The name was originally the Southampton-Port Elgin Golf Club, but the name was changed in the summer of 1925 to the Saugeen Golf and Country Club, only to be renamed the following year as the Saugeen Golf Club. On April 15, 1925, 45 acres (180,000 m^{2}) of farmland was purchased and work began to transform it into a nine-hole golf course. Stanely Thompson & Co.- a golf and landscape architect company from Toronto- was chosen by the board of directors. This first nine-hole course eventually became known as 'Legacy'. By June 20, 1957, another nine holes had been added, the 'Sunset' nine, and Saugeen Golf Club was opened to the public. 1995 saw the opening of the 'Sunrise' course.

== Members ==
Approximately 30,000 rounds of golf a year are played by Saugeen's 650 members.

== Photo gallery ==
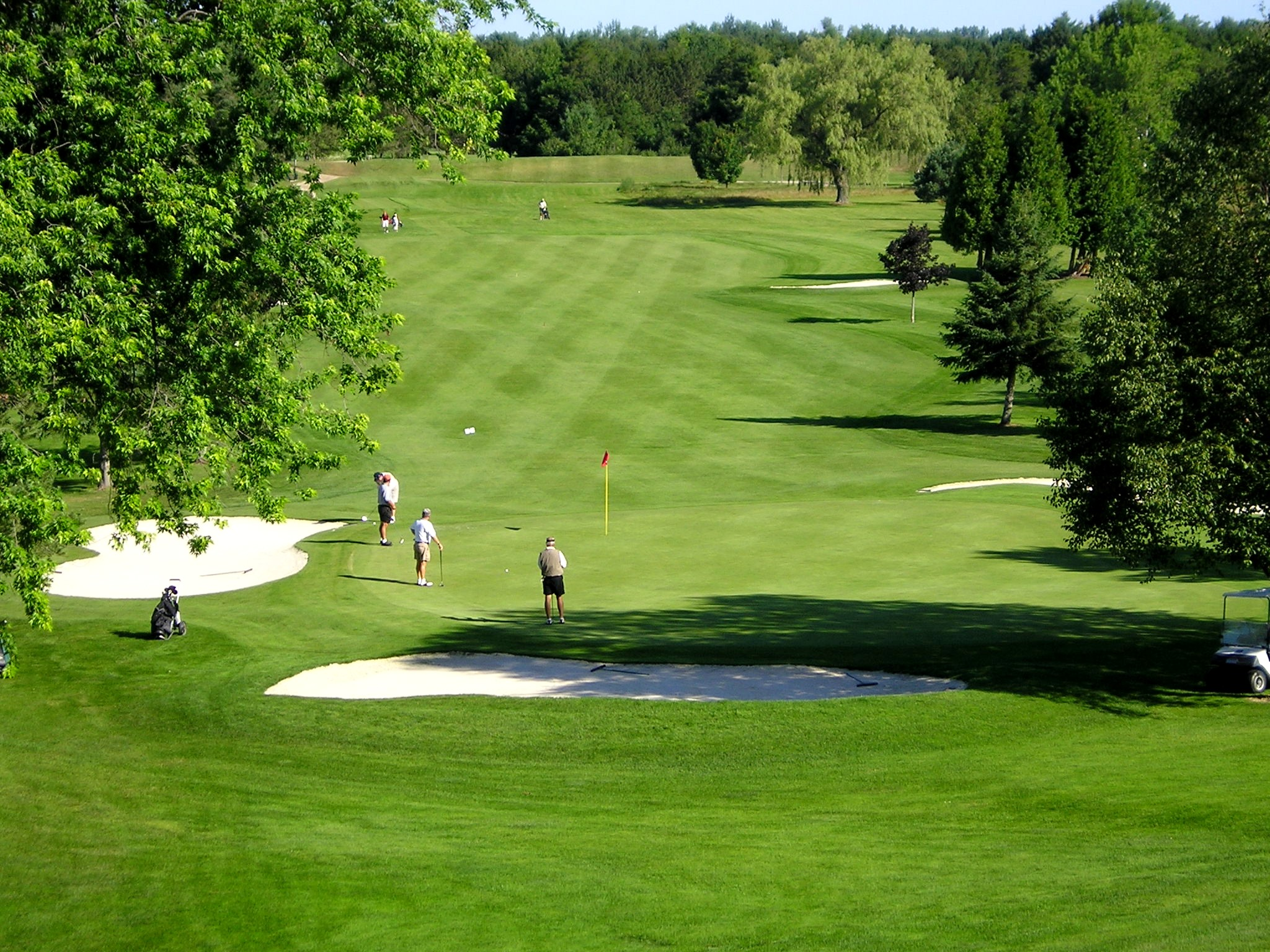
Number 9, Legacy

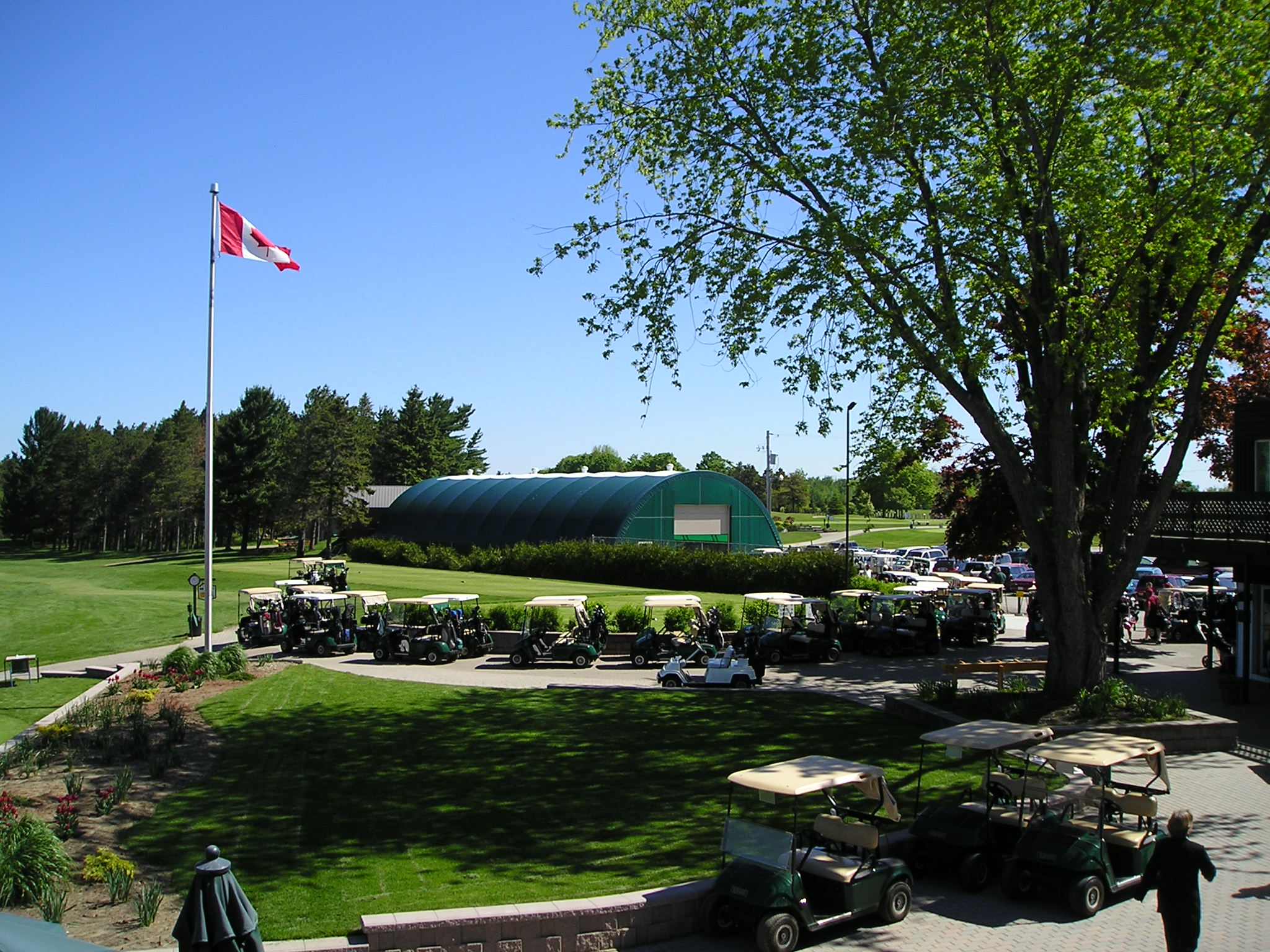
Clubhouse Area

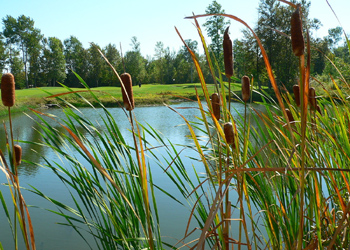
Pond on Sunrise

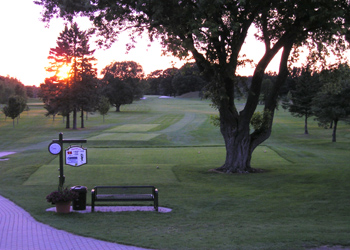
Sunset on 1 Sunset
