= Blomidon Golf & Country Club =

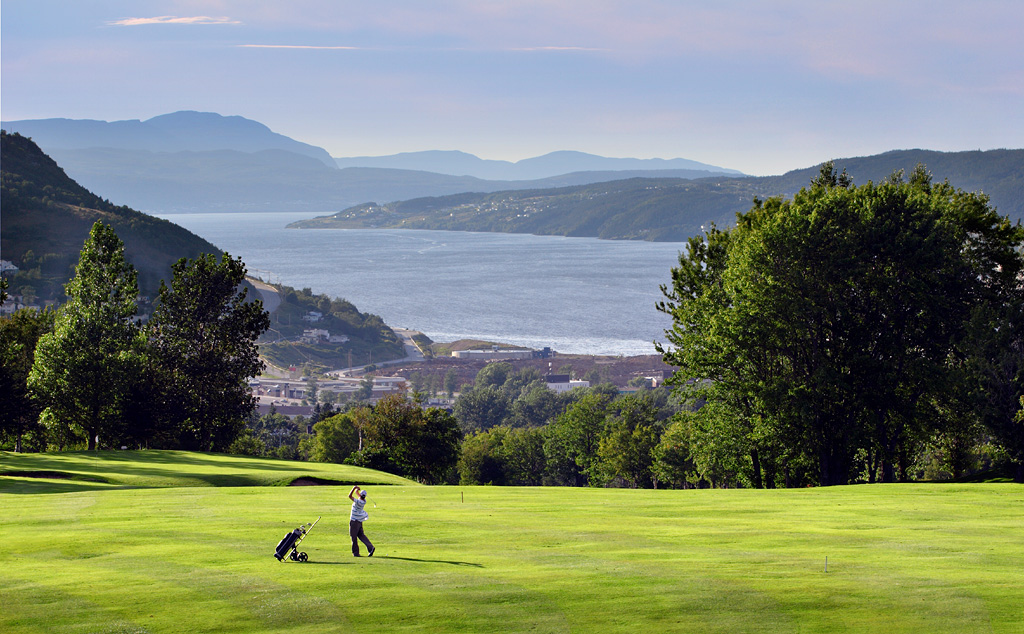
- Interactive map of Blomidon Golf & Country Club
- 48.94249°N 57.92254°W

Club information
- Location: Corner Brook, Newfoundland and Labrador; Canada
- Type: Private
- Tota holes: 18
- Website: www.blomidongolf.com
- Designed by: Graham Cooke
- Par: 70
- Length: 5729 yards
- Course rating: 119

Blomidon Golf & Country Club is a golf course located in Corner Brook, Newfoundland and Labrador, Canada.

== Course ==
Blomidon offers golfers panoramic vistas of the city, as well as views of the surrounding Blomidon Mountains and Bay of Islands. As one of the first golf courses in the province, Blomidon has been an icon in the development of the city Corner Brook. Redesigned by well-known Canadian golf architect Graham Cooke, the 18-hole course provide a challenge to golfers of all levels. Blomidon has hosted several major events, including the National Junior Ladies Championship in 1979 and 1994. The course plays to a par 70, with hole 18 extended from a par 4 to a par 5 several years ago.

== Championships ==
Blomidon is host to NLGA's 2012 Mens and Ladies Amateur, Mid-Amateur and Senior Championships. Blomidon also hosted the National Junior Ladies Championship on two occasions (1979, 1994).

== See also ==
- List of golf courses in Newfoundland and Labrador
