= Hatchet Cove =

Coordinates: 48°02′00″N 53°48′00″W

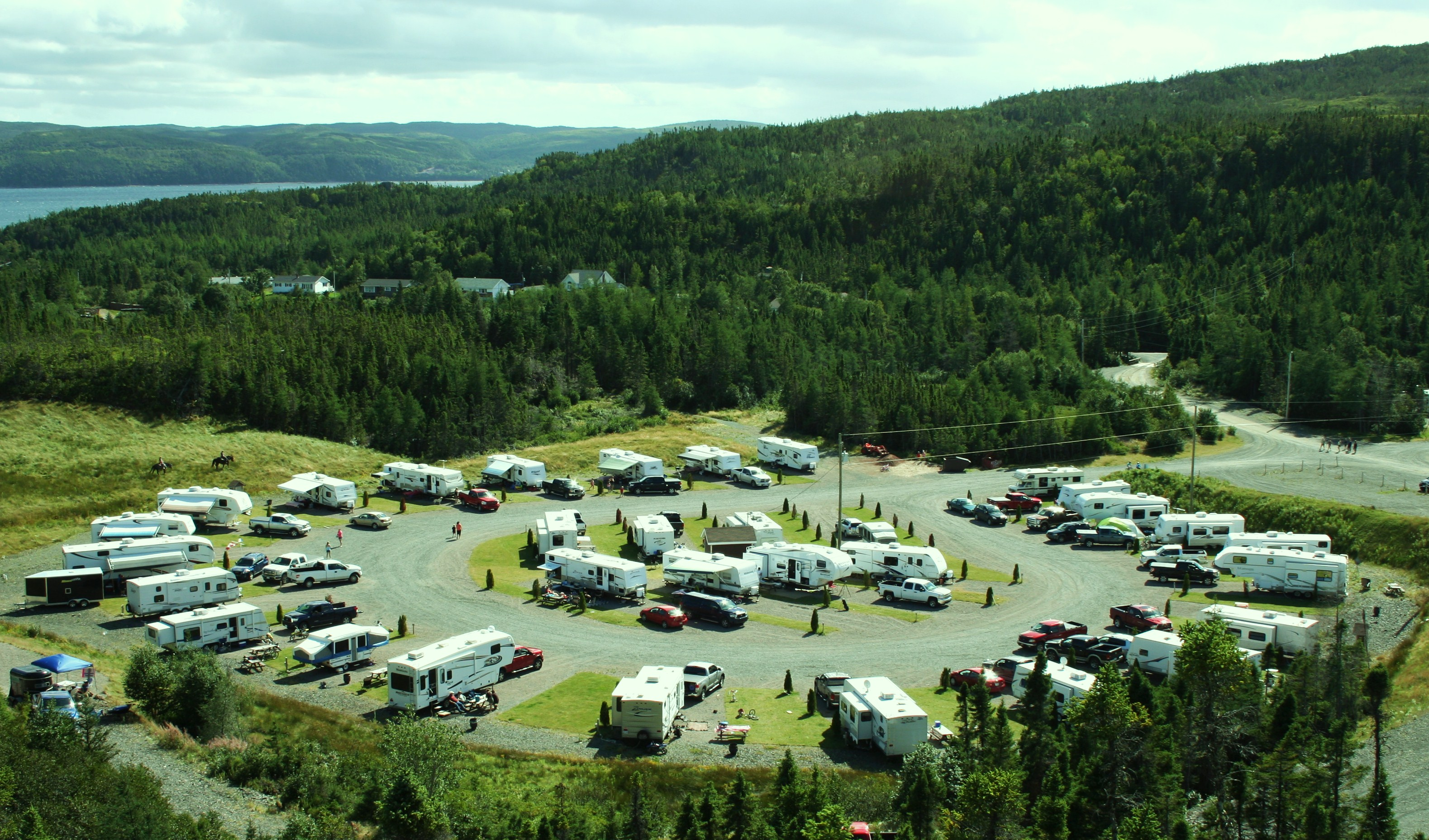
Hatchet Cove

Hatchet Cove is a settlement located southeast of Clarenville. The Way Office was established in 1888 and Elial Robbins was the first Waymaster. It had a population of 67 in 1956.

== See also ==
- List of communities in Newfoundland and Labrador
