= Settlers' Ghost Golf Club =

Canadian public golf course

Coordinates: 44.5433°N 79.6989°W

- 16th hole
- Interactive map of Settlers' Ghost Golf Club

Club information
- Location: Craighurst, Ontario (Canada)
- Established: 2004
- Type: Public
- Tota holes: 18
- Tournaments: CN Canadian Women's Tour, 2009 Laws Golf Tournament
- Website: www.settlersghost.com
- Designed by: John Robinson
- Par: 72
- Length: 6311 yards Longest hole is #10 - 558 yards
- Course rating: 69.1 (Men) 73.4 (Women)
- Course record: 68 - Walailak Satarak (Thailand) (2007); 66 - Silvio De Paola (Canada) (2009)

Settlers' Ghost Golf Club is a public golf course located near Craighurst, Ontario, Canada. It has twice hosted the CN Canadian Women's Tour.

== History ==
In the early 2000s, a group of investors purchased a piece of land in Oro-Medonte Township. After some delays, including an archaeological dig, Settlers' Ghost opened in August 2004 as a 9-hole course. The back nine opened in 2005, making Settlers' Ghost a full 18-hole course.

== Head professional ==
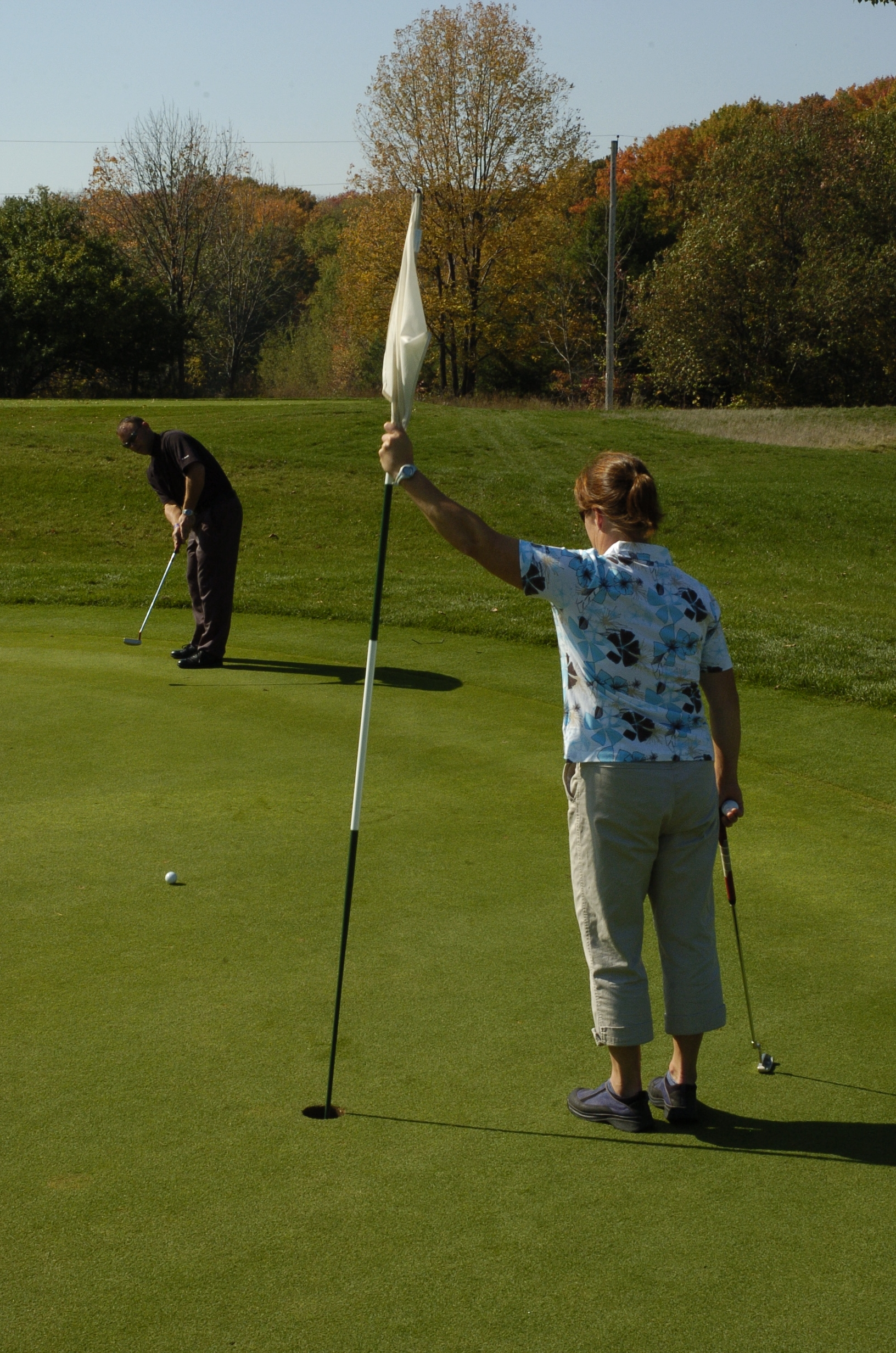
Settlers' Ghost Pros Mary-Pat Quilty & Dave Jackson

The Clubhouse & Barn

Settlers' Ghost in Winter

Settlers' Ghost has two golf professionals on staff. Mary-Pat Quilty is a CPGA Class "A" Head Professional. Prior to working at Settlers' Ghost, Mary-Pat toured in Asia, Australia and in the United States, including a stint on the Futures Tour. She is a two-time OPGA women's champion, winning the event in 2002 and 2006. The CPGA Assistant Professional at Settlers' Ghost is Dave Jackson.

== CN Tour ==
From May 28 to 30, 2006, Settlers' Ghost hosted the CN Canadian Women's Tour, a qualifying tournament for the Canadian Women's Open. Salimah Mussani won the tournament and an exemption into the Canadian Open with a 25-foot birdie putt on the first playoff hole. She and Corina Kelepouris finished the two-day event tied at 4-under par. Mary-Pat Quilty finished the event tied for 40th place at 9-over par.

Settlers' Ghost again hosted the CN Tour in 2007. Quebecer Christine Boucher won the event in a three-way playoff by making a 30-foot birdie putt on the second playoff hole. Boucher, Lauren Mielbrecht and Walailak Satarak finished the event at 1-over par. After finishing the first day in seventh place, Quilty ended up in a tie for 24th place at 10-over par.

== The name ==
The Township of Oro-Medonte, home to this property, has along and storied past, and it is our intent that this golf course serve as a reminder of that past and preserve the memory of those here before us.

The first "settlers" to the area were the Huron Indians and the remains of two important village sites are located nearby. The second group of "settlers", primarily from the British Isles, established agriculture throughout the Township as many of their descendants continue to do.

Settlers' Ghost Golf Club is the third "settler".

"Ghost" refers to the first two groups, who may be gone, but are not forgotten.

Our name was born out of respect for the area. It creates a veiled vision of the past, and our logo carries a mystique that silently beckons you to know more. The golf course speaks for itself.

Our Name, 2004

== Scorecard ==
Settlers' Ghost Gold Tees
Hole	1	2	3	4	5	6	7	8	9	OUT	10	11	12	13	14	15	16	17	18	IN	TOTAL
PAR	4	3	4	4	5	4	3	5	4	36	5	3	5	4	3	5	3	4	4	36	72
YARDS	364	165	343	369	526	332	135	539	314	3087	558	158	516	333	180	561	152	361	405	3224	6311

== See also ==
- Royal Canadian Golf Association
- Canadian Women's Open
