= Lake St. George Golf Club =

Golf course in Washago, Canada

Coordinates: 44.72795°N 79.38279°W

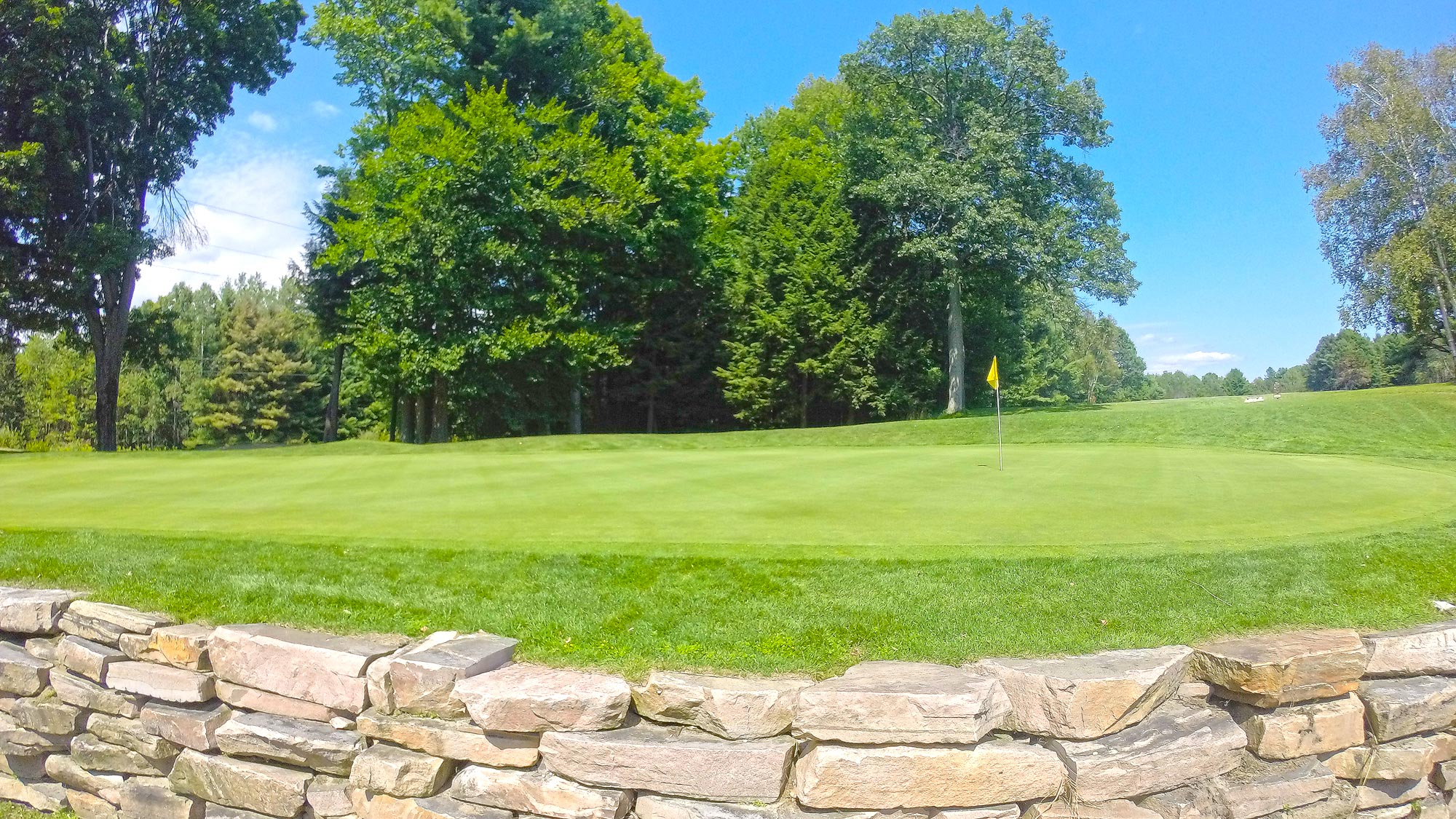
- #5 green on the North Course
- Interactive map of Lake St. George Golf Club

Club information
- Location: Washago, Ontario
- Established: 1952
- Type: Public
- Owner: Greg Louth
- Operator: Dustin Louth, OGSA
- Tota holes: 27
- Website: lakestgeorgegolf.com
- Designed by: Robbie Robinson; Bob Moote

Lake St. George Golf Club is a 27-hole public golf course located in Washago, Ontario, Canada.

== History ==
Lake St. George began as a 9-hole courses in 1952. It was built by Ed Leeder, who had worked at Toronto Golf Club under legendary Canadian PGA professional George Cumming. In 1974, Robbie Robinson designed and built 9 more holes. Robinson was a former protege of Stanley Thompson. In 2002, Bob Moote designed another 9 holes, creating the modern day 27-hole course.

== Courses ==
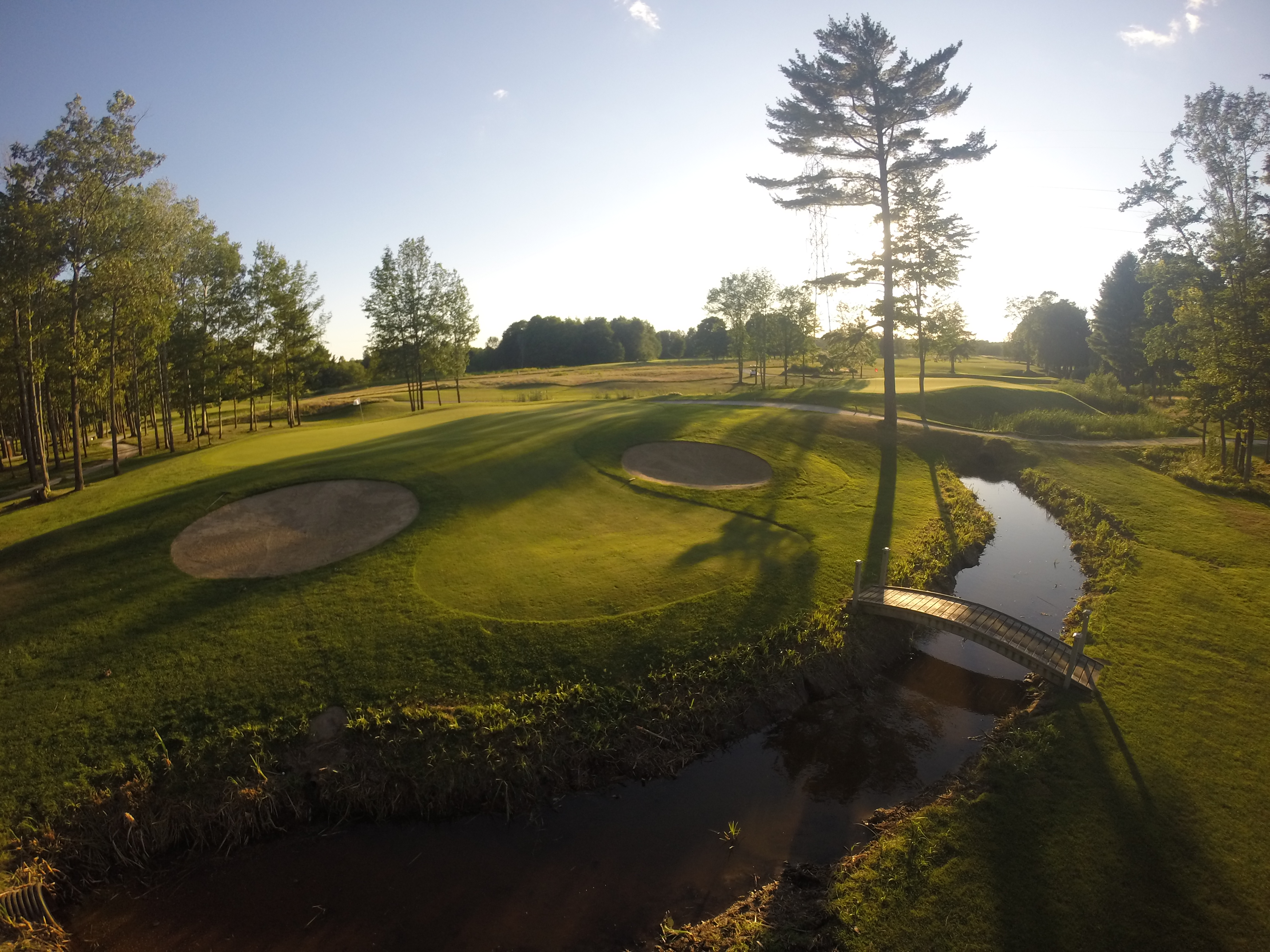
#1 West Course

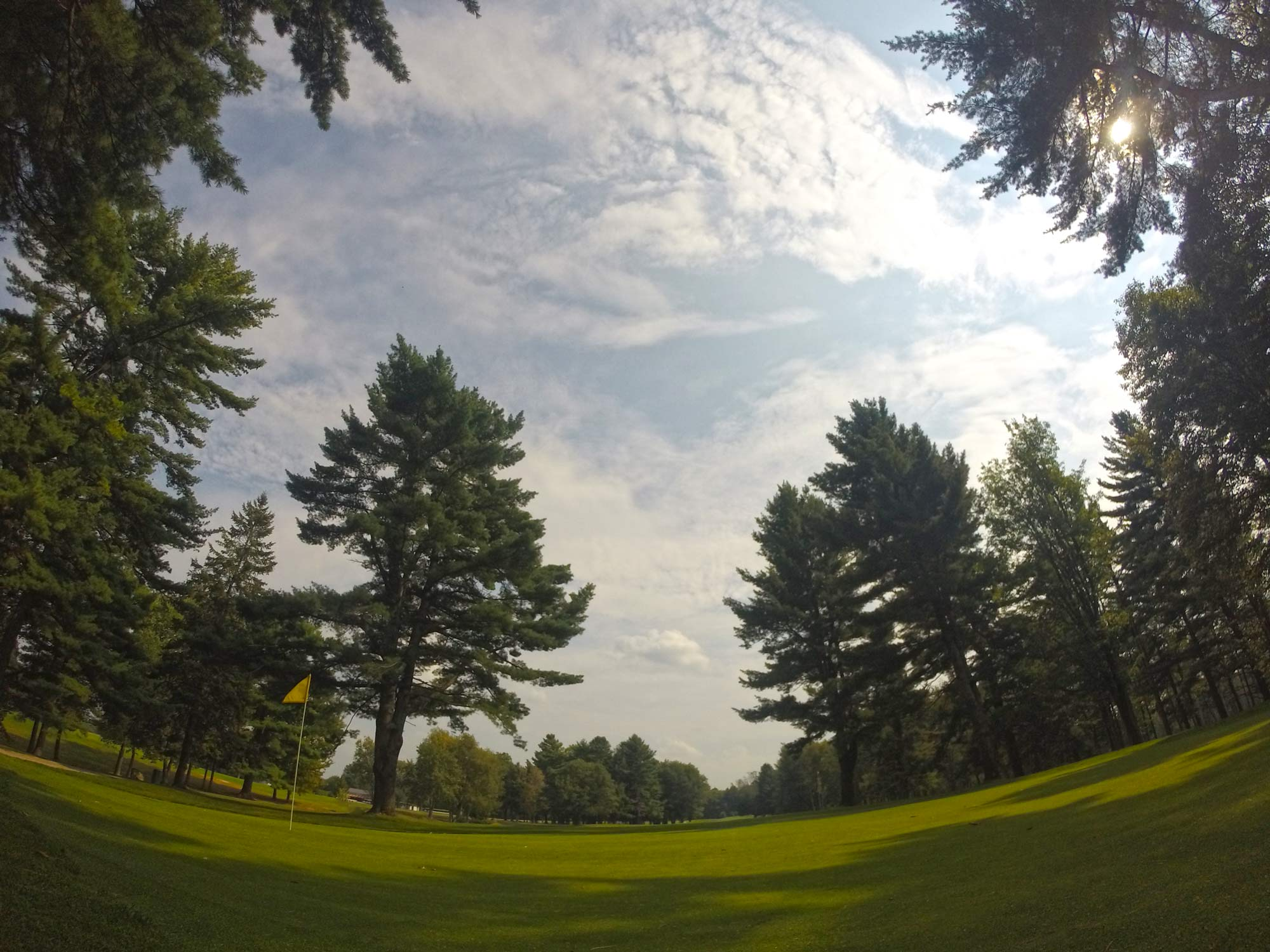
#4 North Course

=== West course ===
Hole	1	2	3	4	5	6	7	8	9	
Par	5	3	5	4	4	4	3	4	4	36
Yards	497	120	437	351	313	372	188	326	321	2924

=== South course ===
Hole	1	2	3	4	5	6	7	8	9	
Par	5	5	3	4	3	4	4	3	5	36
Yards	478	541	180	371	231	405	389	210	456	3261

=== North course ===
Hole	1	2	3	4	5	6	7	8	9	
Par	4	3	4	4	3	5	4	4	5	36
Yards	340	184	361	344	152	531	298	336	478	3024

== See also ==
- Golf Canada
