= PGA of Canada =

Canadian association of golf professionals

- Professional Golfers' Association of Canada
- Formation: 1911
- Type: Professional association
- Legal status: Non-profit organization
- Headquarters: Acton, Ontario, Canada
- Region served: Canada
- President: Tiffany Gordon
- Website: www.pgaofcanada.com

The Professional Golfers' Association of Canada, commonly known as the PGA of Canada, is a non-profit professional association representing golf professionals in Canada. Founded in 1911, it is the world's second-oldest professional golf association. Its national office is in Acton, Ontario, and it operates through nine regional zones.

== History ==
The association was formed following the 1911 Canadian Open at Royal Ottawa Golf Club. George Cumming was elected its first captain, with Percy Barrett as vice-captain. Its first national championship was held at Mississaugua Golf & Country Club in 1912 and was won by Charles Murray. Previously known as the Canadian Professional Golfers' Association or CPGA, it adopted the name PGA of Canada in 2011.
