= Rideau Curling Club =

Curling facility and organization in Canada

Coordinates: 45.412962°N 75.704856°W

- Interactive map of Rideau Curling Club
- Location: 715 Cooper Street; Ottawa, Ontario; K1R 5J5

Information
- Established: 1888
- Club type: Dedicated Ice
- Curling Canada region: OCA Zone 2
- Sheets of ice: Five
- Rock colours: Red and Blue
- Website: http://www.rideaucurlingclub.com/

The Rideau Curling Club is a curling facility and organization located in Ottawa, Ontario, Canada. Founded in 1888, the Rideau Curling Club maintains a rivalry with the Ottawa Curling Club.

== History ==
The original club began operation in November, 1888 as the Rideau Skating and Curling Club. The first facility of the club was the Rideau Skating Rink located on Waller Street, which opened in February 1889. It was a quonset hut style building, with three sheets of ice. The club's original president was Sir Sandford Fleming, and Governor General Lord Stanley as patron. Fleming, who had been a member of the Ottawa Curling Club started the club because the Ottawa would not serve alcoholic beverages after matches.

The club was moved from their Waller St. home in 1916, when their land was requisitioned for war purposes. Their second home (1916–1930) was approximately the present site of the Supreme Court of Canada on Vittoria Street, after the Ottawa Curling Club vacated the facility. In 1930, the club merged with the Rideau Badminton Club. From 1931 until 1949 the club was located at 277 Laurier Ave West, the club's first facility with artificial ice. The club sold its Laurier facility to Sam Berger, and the club reached their present home, at Cooper and Percy Streets in July 1949.

The club competes against the Ottawa Curling Club in the "Ottawa–Rideau Challenge" (called the "Rideau–Ottawa Challenge" by the Rideau Club), an event which began on January 9, 1909. The challenge was held 20 times between 1909 and 1913, and was not revived until 1987. It has been held regularly on an annual basis ever since, and is usually held between Christmas and New Years.

== Provincial champions ==
Year	Event	Skip	Third	Second	Lead	Record at Nationals	Record at Worlds
1985	Senior Men's	Steve Kot	Richard Wilbur	Robert McKenzie	George Ward	(silver) (9–2, CSCC)	—
1988	Men's Silver Tankard	Rick Bachand				—	—
1988	Men's Silver Tankard	Dave Van Dine				—	—
1991	Mixed	Layne Noble	Grace Frey	Mike Johansen	Audrey Frey	T7th (4–7, CMxCC)	—
1993	Women's	Anne Merklinger	Theresa Breen	Patti McKnight	Audrey Frey	(bronze) (7–5, Hearts)	–
1994	Women's	Anne Merklinger	Theresa Breen	Patti McKnight	Audrey Frey	T7th (4–7, Hearts)	–
1996	Mixed	Rich Moffatt	Theresa Breen	Peter Woodcox	Denise Allan	(silver) (9–4, CMxCC)	—
1997	Mixed	Jim Hunker	Cathy Piccinin	Morgan Currie	Janice Remai	11th (2–7, CMxCC)	—
1998	Women's	Anne Merklinger	Theresa Breen	Patti McKnight	Audrey Frey	(silver) (9–5, Hearts)	–
1998	Men's Silver Tankard	Dave Van Dine	J.P. Lachance	Brian Lewis	Scott Linesman	—	—
1998	Men's Silver Tankard	Rich Moffatt				—	—
1999	Men's	Rich Moffatt	Howard Rajala	Chris Fulton	Paul Madden	6th (6–5, Brier)	–
2000	Women's	Anne Merklinger	Theresa Breen	Patti McKnight	Audrey Frey	(silver) (11–2, Hearts)	
2001	Mixed	Howard Rajala	Darcie Simpson	Chris Fulton	Linda Fulton	5th (8–5, CMxCC)	
2003	Bantam Girls	Rachel Homan	Emma Miskew	Alison Kreviazuk	Nicole Johnston	–	–
2003	Senior Women's	Joyce Potter	Muriel Potter	Janelle Sadler	Faye Linseman	(bronze) (9–3, CSCC)	–
2005	Junior Women's	Erin Morrissey	Samantha Peters	Karen Sagle	Katie Morrissey	11th (4–8, CJCC)	
2005	Senior Women's	Joyce Potter	Muriel Potter	Janelle Sadler	Bonnie Morris	(gold) (11–2, CSCC)	(silver) (5–2, WSCC)
2008	Senior Mixed	Layne Noble	Barb Kelly	Bob Boland	Diana Favel	—	—
2009	Senior Women's	Cheryl McBain	Joyce Potter	Janelle Salder	Diana Favel	4th (7–4, CSCC)	–
2009	Senior Mixed	Layne Noble	Barb Kelly	Bob Boland	Eveline Shaw	—	—
2011	Senior Women's	Joyce Potter	Diana Favel	Janelle Sadler	Brenda Moffitt	(silver) (9–3, CSCC)	–
2011	Master Women's	Joyce Potter	Diana Favel	Janelle Sadler	Brenda Moffitt	4th (5–3, CMCC)	
2012	Mixed	Mark Homan	Rachel Homan	Brian Fleischaker	Alison Kreviazuk	T4th (8–5, CMxCC)	
2012	Master Women's	Joyce Potter	Diana Favel	Janelle Sadler	Brenda Moffitt	(silver) (8–3, CMCC)	—
2012	Senior Mixed	Mike Johansen	Barb Kelly	Bob Boland	Debbie Wall	—	—
2012	Junior Mixed	Brett Lyon-Hatcher	Evie Fortier	Ben Miskew	Sydney Chasty	—	—
2013	Senior Men's	Howard Rajala	Rich Moffatt	Doug Johnston	Ken Sullivan	(silver) (10–4, CSCC)	–
2013	Master Women's	Joyce Potter	Diana Favel	Janelle Sadler	Jennifer Langley	(gold) (9–1, CMCC)	—
2013	Men's Silver Tankard	Chris Gardner	J.P. Lachance	Paul Winford	Dan Baird	—	—
2013	Men's Silver Tankard	Don Bowser	Jonathan Beuk	Billy Woods	Scott Chadwick	—	—
2014	Junior Men's	Ryan McCrady	Doug Kee	Matt Haughn	Cole Lyon-Hatcher	4th (6–4, CJCC)	–
2014	Master Men's	Layne Noble	Rick Bachand	Bob Hanna	Bob Boland	(bronze) (7–3, CMCC)	—
2014	Master Women's	Diana Favel	Jennifer Langley	Janelle Sandler	Judy Tolloch	(silver) (9–2, CMCC)	—
2014	Senior Mixed	Paul Madden	Natalie Boucher	Norm Hewitt	Carole Fujimoto	—	—
2014	Junior Mixed	Ryan McCrady	Lauren Horton	Mathew Haughn	Jessica Armstrong	—	—
2015	Master Women's	Diana Favel	Sheila Rogers	Edna Legault	Sue Kollar	(silver) (8–3, CMCC)	—
2017	Junior Women's	Hailey Armstrong	Grace Holyoke	Lindsay Dubue	Marcia Richardson	(silver) (10–1, CJCC)	
2017	Senior Men's	Howard Rajala	Rich Moffatt	Chris Fulton	Paul Madden	(silver) (7–5, CSCC)	–
2018	Senior Mixed	JP Lachance	Kathy Kerr	Mike Johansen	Andrea Ryan	—	—
2019	Senior Mixed	JP Lachance	Kathy Kerr	Mike Johansen	Andrea Ryan	—	—
2019	U18 Mixed	Jordan McNamara	Alyssa Blad	Maxime Daigle	Laura Smith	—	—
2020	Junior Women's	Sierra Sutherland	Adrienne Belliveau	Chelsea Ferrier	Julie Breton	6th (5–5, CJCC)	–
2020	Senior Men's	Howard Rajala	Rich Moffatt	Chris Fulton	Paul Madden	Cancelled	Cancelled
2022	Junior Women's	Emily Deschenes	Emma Artichuk	Grace Lloyd	Evelyn Robert	(silver) (8–3, CJCC)	
2022	Senior Men's	Howard Rajala	Rich Moffatt	Chris Fulton	Paul Madden	(gold) (9–3, CSCC)	(gold) (9–1, WSCC)
2023	Master Men's	Brian Lewis	Graham Neil Sinclair	Michael Johansen	Dave Stanley	4th (9–3, CMCC)	—
2023	Women's Club	Lindsay Thorne	Melissa Gannon	Emily Kelly	Mychelle Zahab	(silver) (8–2, CCCC)	—
2024	Senior Men's	Howard Rajala	Rich Moffatt	Chris Fulton	Paul Madden	8th (3–7, CSCC)	–
2024	Master Men's	Howard Rajala	Rich Moffatt	Chris Fulton	Paul Madden	(gold) (9–3, 2024 CMCC)	—
2025	Senior Mixed	Howard Rajala	Karen Corkery	Chris Fulton	Linda Fulton	—	—
2025	Women's Club	Lindsay Thorne	Melissa Gannon	Emily Kelly	Mychelle Zahab	(gold) (9–2, CCCC)	—
