= 2022 Canadian Senior Curling Championships =

Canadian national curling championship edition

2022 Everest Canadian Senior Curling Championships
- Host city: Yarmouth, Nova Scotia
- Arena: Mariners Centre & Yarmouth Curling Club
- Dates: December 4–10, 2022
- Men's winner: Ontario
- Curling club: Rideau CC, Ottawa
- Skip: Howard Rajala
- Third: Rich Moffatt
- Second: Chris Fulton
- Lead: Paul Madden
- Alternate: Phil Daniel
- Finalist: Alberta (Pahl)
- Women's winner: Saskatchewan
- Curling club: Nutana CC, Saskatoon
- Skip: Sherry Anderson
- Third: Patty Hersikorn
- Second: Brenda Goertzen
- Lead: Anita Silvernagle
- Finalist: Quebec (Osborne)

The 2022 Everest Canadian Senior Curling Championships was held from December 4 to 10 at the Mariners Centre and the Yarmouth Curling Club in Yarmouth, Nova Scotia. The winning teams will represent Canada at the 2023 World Senior Curling Championships in Gangneung, South Korea.

This was the first time Yarmouth hosted the Canadian Senior Curling Championships, and sixth time overall that Nova Scotia hosted the championship.

== Men ==
=== Teams ===
The teams are listed as follows:

Team	Skip	Third	Second	Lead	Alternate	Club
Alberta	James Pahl	Mark Klinck	Kelly Mauthe	John Schmidt		Sherwood Park CC, Sherwood Park
British Columbia	Wes Craig	Steve Waatainen	Keith Clarke	Craig Burton		Nanaimo CC, Nanaimo
Manitoba	Randy Neufeld	Dean Moxham	Peter Nicholls	Dale Michie		La Salle CC, La Salle
New Brunswick	Terry Odishaw	Mike Kennedy	Grant Odishaw	Vance LeCocq		Curl Moncton, Moncton
Newfoundland and Labrador	Keith Ryan	Mike Ryan	Barry Edwards	Dennis Langdon		Carol CC, Labrador City
Northern Ontario	Al Hackner	Frank Morrissette	Rob Sinclair	Gary Champagne	Bob Whalen	Fort William CC, Thunder Bay
Northwest Territories	Glen Hudy	Brian Kelln	Franz Dziuba	Richard Klakowich		Yellowknife CC, Yellowknife
Nova Scotia	Glen MacLeod	Craig Burgess	Kevin Ouellette	Peter Neily		Truro CC, Truro
Nunavut	Peter Mackey	Jeff Nadeau	Greg Howard	Jamie Gauthier		Iqaluit CC, Iqaluit
Ontario	Howard Rajala	Rich Moffatt	Chris Fulton	Paul Madden	Phil Daniel	Rideau CC, Ottawa
Prince Edward Island	Philip Gorveatt	Kevin Champion	Sean Ledgerwood	Mike Dillon		Montague CC, Montague
Quebec	François Roberge	Maxime Elmaleh	Éric Sylvain	Jean Gagnon		CC Etchemin, Saint-Romuald
Saskatchewan	Randy Bryden	Troy Robinson	Russ Bryden	Chris Semenchuk		Caledonian CC, Regina
Yukon	Terry Miller	Chris Meger	Doug Hamilton	Don McPhee		Whitehorse CC, Whitehorse

=== Round-robin standings ===
Final round-robin standings

Key
Teams to Championship Round

Pool A	Skip	W	L
Nova Scotia	Glen MacLeod	5	1
Ontario	Howard Rajala	5	1
Quebec	François Roberge	4	2
British Columbia	Wes Craig	3	3
Northern Ontario	Al Hackner	2	4
Yukon	Terry Miller	2	4
Nunavut	Peter Mackey	0	6

Pool B	Skip	W	L
Manitoba	Randy Neufeld	6	0
Alberta	James Pahl	4	2
Saskatchewan	Randy Bryden	4	2
New Brunswick	Terry Odishaw	3	3
Prince Edward Island	Philip Gorveatt	2	4
Newfoundland and Labrador	Keith Ryan	2	4
Northwest Territories	Glen Hudy	0	6

=== Round-robin results ===
All draws are listed in Atlantic Time (UTC−04:00).

==== Draw 1 ====
Sunday, December 4, 4:00 pm

Sheet 3	1	2	3	4	5	6	7	8	Final
Nunavut (Mackey)	0	2	0	0	0	2	0	X	4
Nova Scotia (MacLeod) 🔨	5	0	0	2	0	0	1	X	8

Sheet 4	1	2	3	4	5	6	7	8	Final
Northwest Territories (Hudy)	0	0	1	0	1	0	X	X	2
Newfoundland and Labrador (Ryan) 🔨	4	3	0	2	0	1	X	X	10

Sheet 6	1	2	3	4	5	6	7	8	Final
British Columbia (Craig)	0	1	1	0	1	0	0	0	3
Ontario (Rajala) 🔨	1	0	0	2	0	1	1	1	6

==== Draw 2 ====
Sunday, December 4, 8:00 pm

Sheet 2	1	2	3	4	5	6	7	8	Final
Yukon (Miller)	0	1	0	1	0	0	2	1	5
Quebec (Roberge) 🔨	0	0	2	0	3	1	0	0	6

Sheet 3	1	2	3	4	5	6	7	8	Final
Prince Edward Island (Gorveatt)	2	0	0	0	1	0	X	X	3
Saskatchewan (Bryden) 🔨	0	2	4	1	0	3	X	X	10

Sheet 5	1	2	3	4	5	6	7	8	9	Final
New Brunswick (Odishaw)	1	3	0	2	1	0	0	0	2	9
Alberta (Pahl) 🔨	0	0	1	0	0	3	1	2	0	7

==== Draw 3 ====
Monday, December 5, 10:00 am

Sheet 1	1	2	3	4	5	6	7	8	Final
Ontario (Rajala)	0	0	4	0	0	1	0	3	8
Northern Ontario (Hackner) 🔨	0	1	0	2	2	0	1	0	6

Sheet 2	1	2	3	4	5	6	7	8	9	Final
Alberta (Pahl)	0	1	0	2	0	1	0	2	0	6
Manitoba (Neufeld) 🔨	2	0	2	0	1	0	1	0	1	7

Sheet 5	1	2	3	4	5	6	7	8	Final
Saskatchewan (Bryden)	4	1	0	4	1	0	X	X	10
Northwest Territories (Hudy) 🔨	0	0	1	0	0	1	X	X	2

==== Draw 4 ====
Monday, December 5, 2:00 pm

Sheet 1	1	2	3	4	5	6	7	8	Final
British Columbia (Craig)	0	2	0	0	0	0	2	X	4
Yukon (Miller) 🔨	1	0	3	1	1	1	0	X	7

Sheet 2	1	2	3	4	5	6	7	8	Final
New Brunswick (Odishaw)	0	2	0	3	1	1	1	X	8
Prince Edward Island (Gorveatt) 🔨	1	0	3	0	0	0	0	X	4

Sheet 5	1	2	3	4	5	6	7	8	Final
Northern Ontario (Hackner)	0	1	0	0	1	2	1	0	5
Nova Scotia (MacLeod) 🔨	2	0	2	1	0	0	0	3	8

Sheet 8	1	2	3	4	5	6	7	8	Final
Quebec (Roberge) 🔨	3	3	6	4	0	2	X	X	18
Nunavut (Mackey)	0	0	0	0	1	0	X	X	1

==== Draw 5 ====
Monday, December 5, 6:00 pm

Sheet 3	1	2	3	4	5	6	7	8	Final
Quebec (Roberge)	0	3	0	2	1	0	1	X	7
British Columbia (Craig) 🔨	1	0	2	0	0	1	0	X	4

Sheet 4	1	2	3	4	5	6	7	8	Final
Saskatchewan (Bryden) 🔨	0	1	0	1	0	4	0	X	6
New Brunswick (Odishaw)	0	0	1	0	1	0	2	X	4

Sheet 6	1	2	3	4	5	6	7	8	Final
Manitoba (Neufeld) 🔨	0	3	2	1	0	5	X	X	11
Newfoundland and Labrador (Ryan)	0	0	0	0	1	0	X	X	1

==== Draw 6 ====
Monday, December 5, 9:00 pm

Sheet 7	1	2	3	4	5	6	7	8	Final
Ontario (Rajala) 🔨	3	0	2	0	1	3	X	X	9
Nunavut (Mackey)	0	1	0	0	0	0	X	X	1

Sheet 8	1	2	3	4	5	6	7	8	Final
Alberta (Pahl) 🔨	2	0	0	2	0	2	0	1	7
Northwest Territories (Hudy)	0	2	1	0	1	0	1	0	5

==== Draw 7 ====
Tuesday, December 6, 8:30 am

Sheet 1	1	2	3	4	5	6	7	8	9	Final
Manitoba (Neufeld) 🔨	0	2	0	1	0	0	1	0	2	6
Saskatchewan (Bryden)	0	0	1	0	0	1	0	2	0	4

Sheet 4	1	2	3	4	5	6	7	8	Final
Northern Ontario (Hackner) 🔨	0	2	0	1	0	1	0	X	4
Quebec (Roberge)	2	0	4	0	1	0	1	X	8

Sheet 7	1	2	3	4	5	6	7	8	Final
Northwest Territories (Hudy)	0	0	1	0	0	1	0	X	2
Prince Edward Island (Gorveatt) 🔨	2	1	0	2	2	0	4	X	11

==== Draw 8 ====
Tuesday, December 6, 12:30 pm

Sheet 2	1	2	3	4	5	6	7	8	Final
Nova Scotia (MacLeod) 🔨	1	0	1	1	2	1	0	X	6
Ontario (Rajala)	0	2	0	0	0	0	2	X	4

Sheet 3	1	2	3	4	5	6	7	8	Final
Newfoundland and Labrador (Ryan) 🔨	0	1	0	1	0	0	0	0	2
Alberta (Pahl)	1	0	1	0	0	2	0	2	6

Sheet 5	1	2	3	4	5	6	7	8	Final
Nunavut (Mackey)	0	0	0	0	0	1	X	X	1
Yukon (Miller) 🔨	4	1	1	0	2	0	X	X	8

==== Draw 9 ====
Tuesday, December 6, 4:30 pm

Sheet 1	1	2	3	4	5	6	7	8	Final
New Brunswick (Odishaw)	3	0	2	3	1	1	X	X	10
Northwest Territories (Hudy) 🔨	0	1	0	0	0	0	X	X	1

Sheet 4	1	2	3	4	5	6	7	8	Final
British Columbia (Craig) 🔨	0	5	1	0	0	3	X	X	9
Nunavut (Mackey)	1	0	0	0	1	0	X	X	2

Sheet 5	1	2	3	4	5	6	7	8	9	Final
Prince Edward Island (Gorveatt)	0	0	0	2	0	0	1	1	0	4
Manitoba (Neufeld) 🔨	0	1	1	0	1	1	0	0	1	5

Sheet 8	1	2	3	4	5	6	7	8	Final
Yukon (Miller)	0	1	0	1	0	2	0	1	5
Northern Ontario (Hackner) 🔨	1	0	1	0	3	0	1	0	6

==== Draw 10 ====
Tuesday, December 6, 8:30 pm

Sheet 1	1	2	3	4	5	6	7	8	Final
Quebec (Roberge)	0	0	1	1	0	0	0	X	2
Nova Scotia (MacLeod) 🔨	1	1	0	0	0	4	1	X	7

Sheet 2	1	2	3	4	5	6	7	8	Final
Saskatchewan (Bryden) 🔨	3	0	3	1	0	2	X	X	9
Newfoundland and Labrador (Ryan)	0	1	0	0	1	0	X	X	2

==== Draw 11 ====
Wednesday, December 7, 10:00 am

Sheet 3	1	2	3	4	5	6	7	8	Final
Yukon (Miller)	0	0	3	0	0	0	2	0	5
Ontario (Rajala) 🔨	0	2	0	0	2	1	0	2	7

Sheet 4	1	2	3	4	5	6	7	8	Final
Prince Edward Island (Gorveatt)	0	1	0	0	2	0	1	0	4
Alberta (Pahl) 🔨	0	0	0	2	0	2	0	1	5

Sheet 5	1	2	3	4	5	6	7	8	Final
Nova Scotia (MacLeod)	0	1	0	2	0	1	0	X	4
British Columbia (Craig) 🔨	0	0	3	0	1	0	4	X	8

Sheet 7	1	2	3	4	5	6	7	8	9	Final
Newfoundland and Labrador (Ryan) 🔨	2	0	0	0	1	0	0	2	3	8
New Brunswick (Odishaw)	0	1	0	1	0	3	0	0	0	5

==== Draw 12 ====
Wednesday, December 7, 2:00 pm

Sheet 2	1	2	3	4	5	6	7	8	Final
Nunavut (Mackey)	0	1	0	0	2	0	0	X	3
Northern Ontario (Hackner) 🔨	1	0	2	0	0	4	1	X	8

Sheet 3	1	2	3	4	5	6	7	8	Final
Northwest Territories (Hudy) 🔨	1	0	1	0	1	0	1	X	4
Manitoba (Neufeld)	0	1	0	2	0	3	0	X	6

Sheet 5	1	2	3	4	5	6	7	8	Final
Ontario (Rajala)	0	1	0	3	1	2	0	1	8
Quebec (Roberge) 🔨	2	0	1	0	0	0	2	0	5

Sheet 6	1	2	3	4	5	6	7	8	9	Final
Alberta (Pahl)	0	1	0	2	0	1	0	1	2	7
Saskatchewan (Bryden) 🔨	0	0	2	0	2	0	1	0	0	5

==== Draw 13 ====
Wednesday, December 7, 6:00 pm

Sheet 1	1	2	3	4	5	6	7	8	Final
Newfoundland and Labrador (Ryan) 🔨	2	0	0	0	3	0	1	0	6
Prince Edward Island (Gorveatt)	0	1	2	1	0	2	0	1	7

Sheet 4	1	2	3	4	5	6	7	8	Final
Nova Scotia (MacLeod) 🔨	0	0	1	1	2	0	3	X	7
Yukon (Miller)	1	1	0	0	0	2	0	X	4

Sheet 7	1	2	3	4	5	6	7	8	9	Final
Northern Ontario (Hackner) 🔨	0	1	0	1	0	3	0	2	0	7
British Columbia (Craig)	0	0	2	0	3	0	2	0	1	8

Sheet 8	1	2	3	4	5	6	7	8	Final
Manitoba (Neufeld) 🔨	4	0	2	0	3	0	1	X	10
New Brunswick (Odishaw)	0	1	0	2	0	3	0	X	6

=== Seeding pool ===
==== Standings ====
Final Seeding Pool Standings

Team	Skip	W	L
Newfoundland and Labrador	Keith Ryan	5	4
Northern Ontario	Al Hackner	4	5
Prince Edward Island	Philip Gorveatt	4	5
Yukon	Terry Miller	3	6
Northwest Territories	Glen Hudy	1	8
Nunavut	Peter Mackey	0	9

==== Results ====
===== Draw 14 =====
Thursday, December 8, 8:30 am

Sheet 3	1	2	3	4	5	6	7	8	Final
Northern Ontario (Hackner)	1	0	1	1	1	1	2	X	7
Northwest Territories (Hudy) 🔨	0	2	0	0	0	0	0	X	2

Sheet 5	1	2	3	4	5	6	7	8	Final
Prince Edward Island (Goveatt) 🔨	3	0	3	1	0	1	0	X	8
Nunavut (Mackey)	0	2	0	0	1	0	1	X	4

Sheet 7	1	2	3	4	5	6	7	8	Final
Yukon (Miller) 🔨	2	0	0	1	1	2	0	X	6
Newfoundland and Labrador (Ryan)	0	1	1	0	0	0	1	X	3

===== Draw 16 =====
Thursday, December 8, 4:30 pm

Sheet 3	1	2	3	4	5	6	7	8	Final
Yukon (Miller)	0	1	0	0	2	1	0	X	4
Prince Edward Island (Goveatt) 🔨	1	0	1	2	0	0	3	X	7

Sheet 5	1	2	3	4	5	6	7	8	Final
Newfoundland and Labrador (Ryan) 🔨	1	0	0	3	2	2	X	X	8
Northern Ontario (Hackner)	0	1	0	0	0	0	X	X	1

Sheet 7	1	2	3	4	5	6	7	8	Final
Northwest Territories (Hudy)	0	2	1	2	0	0	2	X	7
Nunavut (Mackey) 🔨	1	0	0	0	1	1	0	X	3

===== Draw 19 =====
Friday, December 9, 2:00 pm

Sheet 2	1	2	3	4	5	6	7	8	Final
Northern Ontario (Hackner) 🔨	2	0	5	0	2	0	X	X	9
Prince Edward Island (Goveatt)	0	1	0	1	0	0	X	X	2

Sheet 4	1	2	3	4	5	6	7	8	Final
Nunavut (Mackey)	0	0	0	1	2	0	0	X	3
Newfoundland and Labrador (Ryan) 🔨	3	0	2	0	0	2	3	X	10

Sheet 5	1	2	3	4	5	6	7	8	Final
Yukon (Miller) 🔨	1	0	2	0	1	1	3	X	8
Northwest Territories (Hudy)	0	2	0	2	0	0	0	X	4

=== Championship pool ===
==== Standings ====
Final Championship Pool Standings

Key
Teams to Playoffs

Team	Skip	W	L
Manitoba	Randy Neufeld	10	0
Nova Scotia	Glen MacLeod	8	2
Ontario	Howard Rajala	7	3
Alberta	James Pahl	6	4
Saskatchewan	Randy Bryden	6	4
British Columbia	Wes Craig	5	5
Quebec	François Roberge	5	5
New Brunswick	Terry Odishaw	3	7

==== Results ====
===== Draw 15 =====
Thursday, December 8, 12:30 pm

Sheet 5	1	2	3	4	5	6	7	8	Final
Nova Scotia (MacLeod)	0	3	0	1	0	1	1	1	7
New Brunswick (Odishaw) 🔨	2	0	1	0	2	0	0	0	5

Sheet 6	1	2	3	4	5	6	7	8	Final
Ontario (Rajala) 🔨	1	1	1	0	1	0	0	0	4
Manitoba (Neufeld)	0	0	0	3	0	2	1	1	7

Sheet 7	1	2	3	4	5	6	7	8	Final
Alberta (Pahl)	0	2	0	1	0	0	2	2	7
Quebec (Roberge) 🔨	3	0	1	0	0	2	0	0	6

Sheet 8	1	2	3	4	5	6	7	8	Final
British Columbia (Craig) 🔨	1	0	2	0	1	1	0	0	5
Saskatchewan (Bryden)	0	2	0	2	0	0	3	4	11

===== Draw 17 =====
Thursday, December 8, 8:30 pm

Sheet 1	1	2	3	4	5	6	7	8	Final
Saskatchewan (Bryden) 🔨	2	0	1	0	3	0	0	0	6
Nova Scotia (MacLeod)	0	2	0	1	0	1	2	2	8

Sheet 2	1	2	3	4	5	6	7	8	Final
New Brunswick (Odishaw) 🔨	0	1	0	0	1	0	0	X	2
Ontario (Rajala)	1	0	2	1	0	3	1	X	8

Sheet 3	1	2	3	4	5	6	7	8	Final
Manitoba (Neufeld)	0	0	3	1	2	0	4	X	10
Quebec (Roberge) 🔨	1	1	0	0	0	1	0	X	3

Sheet 4	1	2	3	4	5	6	7	8	Final
Alberta (Pahl) 🔨	0	0	0	0	2	0	2	0	4
British Columbia (Craig)	2	1	1	1	0	1	0	1	7

===== Draw 18 =====
Friday, December 9, 10:00 am

Sheet 5	1	2	3	4	5	6	7	8	Final
Ontario (Rajala) 🔨	2	2	0	0	1	0	2	1	8
Saskatchewan (Bryden)	0	0	2	1	0	2	0	0	5

Sheet 6	1	2	3	4	5	6	7	8	Final
Nova Scotia (MacLeod)	0	2	4	0	3	0	X	X	9
Alberta (Pahl) 🔨	0	0	0	1	0	1	X	X	2

Sheet 7	1	2	3	4	5	6	7	8	Final
British Columbia (Craig)	0	0	0	0	0	1	X	X	1
Manitoba (Neufeld) 🔨	0	2	2	2	1	0	X	X	7

Sheet 8	1	2	3	4	5	6	7	8	Final
Quebec (Roberge)	1	0	0	3	0	2	0	1	7
New Brunswick (Odishaw) 🔨	0	1	0	0	1	0	2	0	4

===== Draw 20 =====
Friday, December 9, 6:00 pm

Sheet 1	1	2	3	4	5	6	7	8	Final
New Brunswick (Odishaw)	2	0	0	1	0	0	1	0	4
British Columbia (Craig) 🔨	0	2	1	0	1	0	0	2	6

Sheet 2	1	2	3	4	5	6	7	8	Final
Saskatchewan (Bryden) 🔨	0	1	4	0	1	0	0	X	6
Quebec (Roberge)	1	0	0	1	0	1	1	X	4

Sheet 3	1	2	3	4	5	6	7	8	9	Final
Alberta (Pahl)	0	0	2	0	1	0	0	3	1	7
Ontario (Rajala) 🔨	1	0	0	4	0	1	0	0	0	6

Sheet 4	1	2	3	4	5	6	7	8	Final
Manitoba (Neufeld) 🔨	0	1	0	0	3	0	1	5	10
Nova Scotia (MacLeod)	1	0	1	1	0	2	0	0	5

=== Playoffs ===
Semifinals
1	Manitoba	3
4	Alberta	4
2	Nova Scotia	5
3	Ontario	6

Final
4	Alberta	6
3	Ontario	7
Bronze medal game
1	Manitoba	10
2	Nova Scotia	7

==== Semifinals ====
Saturday, December 10, 8:30 am

Sheet 1	1	2	3	4	5	6	7	8	9	Final
Nova Scotia (MacLeod) 🔨	1	0	1	0	2	0	1	0	0	5
Ontario (Rajala)	0	2	0	1	0	1	0	1	1	6

Sheet 2	1	2	3	4	5	6	7	8	Final
Manitoba (Neufeld) 🔨	1	0	1	0	0	0	1	0	3
Alberta (Pahl)	0	1	0	0	0	1	0	2	4

==== Bronze medal game ====
Saturday, December 10, 12:30 pm

Sheet 4	1	2	3	4	5	6	7	8	Final
Manitoba (Neufeld) 🔨	3	4	0	0	3	0	0	X	10
Nova Scotia (MacLeod)	0	0	3	1	0	2	1	X	7

==== Gold medal game ====
Saturday, December 10, 12:30 pm

Sheet 3	1	2	3	4	5	6	7	8	Final
Alberta (Pahl)	0	0	2	0	1	0	1	2	6
Ontario (Rajala) 🔨	2	1	0	1	0	3	0	0	7

== Women ==
=== Teams ===
The teams are listed as follows:

Team	Skip	Third	Second	Lead	Alternate	Club
Alberta	Diane Foster	Karen Morrison	Bev Buckley	Darlene Hall		Calgary/Garrison/Brooks
British Columbia	LeAnne Andrews	Jenn Routiffe	Tracy Strecker	Cathy Chapman		Langley CC, Langley
Manitoba	Terry Ursel	Wanda Rainka	Brenda Walker	Tracy Igonia	Chris Hamblin	Neepawa CC, Neepawa
New Brunswick	Sandy Comeau	Shelley Thomas	Carol Justason	Allison Chisholm		Curl Moncton, Moncton
Newfoundland and Labrador	Laura Phillips	Heather Martin	Cathy Rogers	Candy Thomas		RE/MAX Centre, St. John's
Northern Ontario	Tracey Larocque	Peggy Taylor	Lisa Penner	Deanna Hicklin		Fort William CC, Thunder Bay
Northwest Territories	Sharon Cormier	Cheryl Tordoff	Marta Moir	Kelly Kaylo	Wendy Ondrack	Yellowknife CC, Yellowknife
Nova Scotia	Theresa Breen	Mary-Sue Radford	Julie McMullin	Helen Radford		Halifax CC, Halifax
Nunavut	Geneva Chislett	Diane North	Robyn Mackey	Denise Hutchings		Iqaluit CC, Iqaluit
Ontario	Jo-Ann Rizzo	Janet Murphy	Lori Eddy	Mary Chilvers		Mississaugua G&CC, Mississauga
Prince Edward Island	Shelly Bradley	Susan McInnis	Julie Scales	Tricia MacGregor		Cornwall CC, Montague
Quebec	Chantal Osborne	Josée Friolet	Marie-Josée Précourt	Sylvie Daniel	Christine Paradis	Thurso/Laval/Roberval
Saskatchewan	Sherry Anderson	Patty Hersikorn	Brenda Goertzen	Anita Silvernagle		Nutana CC, Saskatoon
Yukon	Laura Eby	Lorna Spencer	Laini Klassen	Laura Williamson		Whitehorse CC, Whitehorse

=== Round-robin standings ===
Final round-robin standings

Key
Teams to Championship Round

Pool A	Skip	W	L
Saskatchewan	Sherry Anderson	6	0
British Columbia	LeAnne Andrews	4	2
Alberta	Diane Foster	3	3
Newfoundland and Labrador	Laura Phillips	3	3
Northwest Territories	Sharon Cormier	2	4
Northern Ontario	Tracey Larocque	2	4
Nunavut	Geneva Chislett	1	5

Pool B	Skip	W	L
Nova Scotia	Theresa Breen	5	1
Quebec	Chantal Osborne	5	1
Ontario	Jo-Ann Rizzo	4	2
Yukon	Laura Eby	3	3
Prince Edward Island	Shelly Bradley	2	4
Manitoba	Terry Ursel	1	5
New Brunswick	Sandy Comeau	1	5

=== Round-robin results ===
All draws are listed in Atlantic Time (UTC−04:00).

==== Draw 1 ====
Sunday, December 4, 4:00 pm

Sheet 1	1	2	3	4	5	6	7	8	Final
Nunavut (Chislett)	0	0	0	1	0	1	X	X	2
Northern Ontario (Larocque) 🔨	4	1	2	0	3	0	X	X	10

Sheet 2	1	2	3	4	5	6	7	8	9	Final
Prince Edward Island (Bradley) 🔨	0	0	2	0	2	0	1	0	2	7
New Brunswick (Comeau)	1	0	0	2	0	1	0	1	0	5

Sheet 5	1	2	3	4	5	6	7	8	Final
Quebec (Osborne)	0	2	2	2	1	0	1	X	8
Ontario (Rizzo) 🔨	3	0	0	0	0	1	0	X	4

Sheet 8	1	2	3	4	5	6	7	8	Final
Newfoundland and Labrador (Phillips)	0	1	0	0	0	0	X	X	1
Saskatchewan (Anderson) 🔨	2	0	2	2	1	1	X	X	8

==== Draw 2 ====
Sunday, December 4, 8:00 pm

Sheet 1	1	2	3	4	5	6	7	8	Final
Yukon (Eby)	1	0	0	1	0	1	0	X	3
Nova Scotia (Breen) 🔨	0	3	1	0	2	0	2	X	8

Sheet 4	1	2	3	4	5	6	7	8	Final
Northwest Territories (Cormier)	0	1	0	0	3	1	0	X	5
British Columbia (Andrews) 🔨	2	0	0	3	0	0	3	X	8

==== Draw 3 ====
Monday, December 5, 10:00 am

Sheet 3	1	2	3	4	5	6	7	8	Final
Saskatchewan (Anderson) 🔨	2	3	0	1	0	2	0	X	8
Alberta (Foster)	0	0	1	0	3	0	1	X	5

Sheet 4	1	2	3	4	5	6	7	8	Final
Ontario (Rizzo)	2	2	1	1	0	0	2	X	8
Manitoba (Ursel) 🔨	0	0	0	0	0	2	0	X	2

==== Draw 4 ====
Monday, December 5, 2:00 pm

Sheet 3	1	2	3	4	5	6	7	8	9	Final
Newfoundland and Labrador (Phillips) 🔨	0	1	0	1	0	0	0	3	2	7
Northwest Territories (Cormier)	0	0	1	0	2	1	1	0	0	5

Sheet 4	1	2	3	4	5	6	7	8	Final
Quebec (Osborne) 🔨	0	3	0	1	1	0	0	4	9
Yukon (Eby)	1	0	2	0	0	3	2	0	8

Sheet 6	1	2	3	4	5	6	7	8	Final
British Columbia (Andrews)	1	0	1	1	0	5	X	X	8
Nunavut (Chislett) 🔨	0	1	0	0	1	0	X	X	2

Sheet 7	1	2	3	4	5	6	7	8	Final
Nova Scotia (Breen) 🔨	1	0	0	5	1	0	3	X	10
Prince Edward Island (Bradley)	0	2	0	0	0	1	0	X	3

==== Draw 5 ====
Monday, December 5, 6:00 pm

Sheet 1	1	2	3	4	5	6	7	8	Final
British Columbia (Andrews)	1	0	0	2	0	0	0	X	3
Newfoundland and Labrador (Phillips) 🔨	0	2	1	0	1	1	1	X	6

Sheet 2	1	2	3	4	5	6	7	8	Final
Nova Scotia (Breen) 🔨	0	1	1	0	0	1	0	3	6
Quebec (Osborne)	1	0	0	1	1	0	2	0	5

Sheet 5	1	2	3	4	5	6	7	8	Final
Saskatchewan (Anderson) 🔨	1	1	0	2	0	1	1	X	6
Nunavut (Chislett)	0	0	1	0	1	0	0	X	2

Sheet 7	1	2	3	4	5	6	7	8	Final
Manitoba (Ursel) 🔨	1	0	1	0	1	2	3	X	8
New Brunswick (Comeau)	0	0	0	1	0	0	0	X	1

Sheet 8	1	2	3	4	5	6	7	8	Final
Alberta (Foster)	1	2	2	1	2	1	X	X	9
Northern Ontario (Larocque) 🔨	0	0	0	0	0	0	X	X	0

==== Draw 6 ====
Monday, December 5, 9:00 pm

Sheet 6	1	2	3	4	5	6	7	8	Final
Ontario (Rizzo)	0	1	0	1	1	3	2	X	8
Prince Edward Island (Bradley) 🔨	1	0	1	0	0	0	0	X	2

==== Draw 7 ====
Tuesday, December 6, 8:30 am

Sheet 2	1	2	3	4	5	6	7	8	9	Final
Alberta (Foster)	0	0	2	0	0	1	0	2	0	5
British Columbia (Andrews) 🔨	1	1	0	1	2	0	0	0	1	6

Sheet 3	1	2	3	4	5	6	7	8	Final
Manitoba (Ursel)	1	0	1	0	0	0	1	0	3
Nova Scotia (Breen) 🔨	0	1	0	2	0	1	0	2	6

Sheet 5	1	2	3	4	5	6	7	8	Final
Prince Edward Island (Bradley)	1	0	1	0	0	1	0	0	3
Yukon (Eby) 🔨	0	1	0	0	1	0	1	1	4

Sheet 8	1	2	3	4	5	6	7	8	Final
Nunavut (Chislett) 🔨	2	1	0	0	1	0	1	0	5
Northwest Territories (Cormier)	0	0	2	2	0	3	0	1	8

==== Draw 8 ====
Tuesday, December 6, 12:30 pm

Sheet 1	1	2	3	4	5	6	7	8	Final
New Brunswick (Comeau)	0	1	0	0	1	0	1	X	3
Ontario (Rizzo) 🔨	0	0	3	2	0	2	0	X	7

Sheet 4	1	2	3	4	5	6	7	8	Final
Northern Ontario (Larocque)	0	1	0	1	0	0	X	X	2
Saskatchewan (Anderson) 🔨	3	0	5	0	3	3	X	X	14

==== Draw 9 ====
Tuesday, December 6, 4:30 pm

Sheet 2	1	2	3	4	5	6	7	8	Final
Newfoundland and Labrador (Phillips)	3	0	0	0	2	0	0	2	7
Nunavut (Chislett) 🔨	0	1	2	0	0	0	2	0	5

Sheet 3	1	2	3	4	5	6	7	8	Final
Quebec (Osborne)	0	1	0	1	1	2	1	X	6
Prince Edward Island (Bradley) 🔨	0	0	1	0	0	0	0	X	1

Sheet 6	1	2	3	4	5	6	7	8	Final
Northwest Territories (Cormier) 🔨	0	1	0	0	1	0	X	X	2
Alberta (Foster)	1	0	2	2	0	3	X	X	8

==== Draw 10 ====
Tuesday, December 6, 8:30 pm

Sheet 3	1	2	3	4	5	6	7	8	Final
British Columbia (Andrews) 🔨	0	2	1	0	0	2	0	1	6
Northern Ontario (Larocque)	1	0	0	0	1	0	1	0	3

Sheet 4	1	2	3	4	5	6	7	8	9	Final
Nova Scotia (Breen) 🔨	3	0	0	3	0	0	0	0	0	6
New Brunswick (Comeau)	0	1	1	0	1	1	1	1	2	8

Sheet 5	1	2	3	4	5	6	7	8	Final
Yukon (Eby) 🔨	0	0	3	0	0	2	3	X	8
Manitoba (Ursel)	1	0	0	2	2	0	0	X	5

==== Draw 11 ====
Wednesday, December 7, 10:00 am

Sheet 1	1	2	3	4	5	6	7	8	Final
Northwest Territories (Cormier)	0	0	1	2	0	0	0	X	3
Saskatchewan (Anderson) 🔨	1	3	0	0	1	2	1	X	8

Sheet 2	1	2	3	4	5	6	7	8	Final
Yukon (Eby)	0	0	0	1	0	1	0	0	2
Ontario (Rizzo) 🔨	2	0	0	0	1	0	1	3	7

Sheet 6	1	2	3	4	5	6	7	8	Final
Northern Ontario (Larocque)	0	3	0	0	1	1	1	X	6
Newfoundland and Labrador (Phillips) 🔨	2	0	1	1	0	0	0	X	4

Sheet 8	1	2	3	4	5	6	7	8	Final
New Brunswick (Comeau)	0	0	2	0	0	0	2	0	4
Quebec (Osborne) 🔨	1	1	0	2	1	1	0	1	7

==== Draw 12 ====
Wednesday, December 7, 2:00 pm

Sheet 1	1	2	3	4	5	6	7	8	Final
Prince Edward Island (Bradley) 🔨	2	1	2	1	0	0	0	X	6
Manitoba (Ursel)	0	0	0	0	1	0	1	X	2

Sheet 4	1	2	3	4	5	6	7	8	Final
Nunavut (Chislett)	1	1	0	0	3	0	1	1	7
Alberta (Foster) 🔨	0	0	2	1	0	1	0	0	4

Sheet 7	1	2	3	4	5	6	7	8	9	Final
Saskatchewan (Anderson) 🔨	0	1	0	0	0	3	2	0	1	7
British Columbia (Andrews)	0	0	0	3	1	0	0	2	0	6

Sheet 8	1	2	3	4	5	6	7	8	Final
Ontario (Rizzo) 🔨	1	0	1	0	2	0	2	0	6
Nova Scotia (Breen)	0	3	0	2	0	1	0	1	7

==== Draw 13 ====
Wednesday, December 7, 6:00 pm

Sheet 2	1	2	3	4	5	6	7	8	Final
Northern Ontario (Larocque)	0	1	0	1	1	2	0	0	5
Northwest Territories (Cormier) 🔨	1	0	1	0	0	0	2	2	6

Sheet 3	1	2	3	4	5	6	7	8	Final
New Brunswick (Comeau)	2	1	0	0	1	0	1	X	5
Yukon (Eby) 🔨	0	0	1	2	0	5	0	X	8

Sheet 5	1	2	3	4	5	6	7	8	9	Final
Alberta (Foster) 🔨	2	0	1	0	0	1	1	0	1	6
Newfoundland and Labrador (Phillips)	0	1	0	2	1	0	0	1	0	5

Sheet 6	1	2	3	4	5	6	7	8	Final
Manitoba (Ursel)	1	0	0	0	1	1	0	X	3
Quebec (Osborne) 🔨	0	3	1	2	0	0	3	X	9

=== Seeding pool ===
==== Standings ====
Final Seeding Pool Standings

Team	Skip	W	L
Prince Edward Island	Shelly Bradley	5	4
Northern Ontario	Tracey Larocque	4	5
Northwest Territories	Sharon Cormier	3	6
New Brunswick	Sandy Comeau	2	7
Nunavut	Geneva Chislett	2	7
Manitoba	Terry Ursel	2	7

==== Results ====
===== Draw 14 =====
Thursday, December 8, 8:30 am

Sheet 2	1	2	3	4	5	6	7	8	Final
Northwest Territories (Cormier)	1	0	1	1	1	2	1	X	7
New Brunswick (Comeau) 🔨	0	2	0	0	0	0	0	X	2

Sheet 4	1	2	3	4	5	6	7	8	Final
Prince Edward Island (Bradley) 🔨	1	0	3	1	1	1	X	X	7
Nunavut (Chislett)	0	1	0	0	0	0	X	X	1

Sheet 6	1	2	3	4	5	6	7	8	Final
Manitoba (Ursel) 🔨	2	2	0	0	1	0	1	0	6
Northern Ontario (Larocque)	0	0	2	4	0	1	0	1	8

===== Draw 16 =====
Thursday, December 8, 4:30 pm

Sheet 2	1	2	3	4	5	6	7	8	Final
Northern Ontario (Larocque)	0	1	0	0	0	0	X	X	1
Prince Edward Island (Bradley) 🔨	2	0	1	0	1	3	X	X	7

Sheet 4	1	2	3	4	5	6	7	8	9	Final
Manitoba (Ursel)	0	0	0	0	1	4	0	2	2	9
Northwest Territories (Cormier) 🔨	1	1	1	1	0	0	3	0	0	7

Sheet 6	1	2	3	4	5	6	7	8	Final
New Brunswick (Comeau) 🔨	1	2	4	0	5	0	X	X	12
Nunavut (Chislett)	0	0	0	1	0	1	X	X	2

===== Draw 19 =====
Friday, December 9, 2:00 pm

Sheet 3	1	2	3	4	5	6	7	8	Final
Northwest Territories (Cormier)	1	0	1	0	1	0	0	0	3
Prince Edward Island (Bradley) 🔨	0	2	0	1	0	1	1	2	7

Sheet 7	1	2	3	4	5	6	7	8	9	Final
Northern Ontario (Larocque) 🔨	1	0	1	1	0	2	1	0	1	7
New Brunswick (Comeau)	0	1	0	0	1	0	0	4	0	6

Sheet 8	1	2	3	4	5	6	7	8	9	Final
Nunavut (Chislett)	0	2	0	0	0	0	1	1	1	5
Manitoba (Ursel) 🔨	1	0	2	0	0	1	0	0	0	4

=== Championship pool ===
==== Standings ====
Final Championship Pool Standings

Key
Teams to Playoffs

Team	Skip	W	L
Nova Scotia	Theresa Breen	9	1
Quebec	Chantal Osborne	9	1
Ontario	Jo-Ann Rizzo	7	3
Saskatchewan	Sherry Anderson	7	3
British Columbia	LeAnne Andrews	6	4
Alberta	Diane Foster	4	6
Newfoundland and Labrador	Laura Phillips	4	6
Yukon	Laura Eby	3	7

==== Results ====
===== Draw 15 =====
Thursday, December 8, 12:30 pm

Sheet 1	1	2	3	4	5	6	7	8	Final
Saskatchewan (Anderson) 🔨	3	2	0	1	0	0	3	X	9
Yukon (Eby)	0	0	2	0	1	0	0	X	3

Sheet 2	1	2	3	4	5	6	7	8	9	Final
British Columbia (Andrews)	0	1	0	1	0	0	1	2	0	5
Nova Scotia (Breen) 🔨	2	0	1	0	1	1	0	0	4	9

Sheet 3	1	2	3	4	5	6	7	8	Final
Alberta (Foster)	0	1	0	2	0	0	4	0	7
Quebec (Osborne) 🔨	1	0	1	0	4	1	0	1	8

Sheet 4	1	2	3	4	5	6	7	8	Final
Newfoundland and Labrador (Phillips)	0	3	3	0	0	0	1	0	7
Ontario (Rizzo) 🔨	2	0	0	2	2	1	0	1	8

===== Draw 17 =====
Thursday, December 8, 8:30 pm

Sheet 5	1	2	3	4	5	6	7	8	Final
Ontario (Rizzo)	0	1	0	0	1	0	2	1	5
Saskatchewan (Anderson) 🔨	1	0	1	1	0	1	0	0	4

Sheet 6	1	2	3	4	5	6	7	8	9	Final
Yukon (Eby) 🔨	0	0	1	0	1	1	1	1	0	5
British Columbia (Andrews)	1	2	0	2	0	0	0	0	1	6

Sheet 7	1	2	3	4	5	6	7	8	Final
Nova Scotia (Breen) 🔨	0	2	0	1	0	2	2	X	7
Alberta (Foster)	0	0	1	0	1	0	0	X	2

Sheet 8	1	2	3	4	5	6	7	8	Final
Quebec (Osborne) 🔨	2	0	3	4	0	6	X	X	15
Newfoundland and Labrador (Phillips)	0	2	0	0	2	0	X	X	4

===== Draw 18 =====
Friday, December 9, 10:00 am

Sheet 1	1	2	3	4	5	6	7	8	Final
British Columbia (Andrews) 🔨	2	0	0	0	1	1	3	X	7
Ontario (Rizzo)	0	1	1	0	0	0	0	X	2

Sheet 2	1	2	3	4	5	6	7	8	Final
Saskatchewan (Anderson)	1	0	1	0	0	0	1	0	3
Quebec (Osborne) 🔨	0	1	0	1	0	1	0	3	6

Sheet 3	1	2	3	4	5	6	7	8	Final
Newfoundland and Labrador (Phillips)	1	0	0	0	0	0	0	X	1
Nova Scotia (Breen) 🔨	0	2	0	1	0	1	2	X	6

Sheet 4	1	2	3	4	5	6	7	8	Final
Alberta (Foster)	0	4	1	1	0	2	2	X	10
Yukon (Eby) 🔨	1	0	0	0	1	0	0	X	2

===== Draw 20 =====
Friday, December 9, 6:00 pm

Sheet 5	1	2	3	4	5	6	7	8	Final
Yukon (Eby)	0	1	0	0	4	0	X	X	5
Newfoundland and Labrador (Phillips) 🔨	4	0	1	3	0	5	X	X	13

Sheet 6	1	2	3	4	5	6	7	8	Final
Ontario (Rizzo) 🔨	1	1	0	1	0	2	1	X	6
Alberta (Foster)	0	0	1	0	3	0	0	X	4

Sheet 7	1	2	3	4	5	6	7	8	Final
Quebec (Osborne) 🔨	1	0	0	2	1	0	0	2	6
British Columbia (Andrews)	0	1	1	0	0	2	1	0	5

Sheet 8	1	2	3	4	5	6	7	8	Final
Nova Scotia (Breen) 🔨	0	3	0	2	1	0	3	X	9
Saskatchewan (Anderson)	2	0	2	0	0	3	0	X	7

=== Playoffs ===
Semifinals
1	Nova Scotia	4
4	Saskatchewan	7
2	Quebec	7
3	Ontario	5

Final
4	Saskatchewan	7
2	Quebec	3
Bronze medal game
1	Nova Scotia	7
3	Ontario	6

==== Semifinals ====
Saturday, December 10, 8:30 am

Sheet 3	1	2	3	4	5	6	7	8	Final
Nova Scotia (Breen) 🔨	0	0	2	1	0	0	1	0	4
Saskatchewan (Anderson)	0	3	0	0	2	1	0	1	7

Sheet 5	1	2	3	4	5	6	7	8	Final
Quebec (Osborne) 🔨	3	0	1	0	1	0	0	2	7
Ontario (Rizzo)	0	1	0	2	0	1	1	0	5

==== Bronze medal game ====
Saturday, December 10, 3:30 pm

Sheet 2	1	2	3	4	5	6	7	8	Final
Nova Scotia (Breen) 🔨	3	0	1	0	2	0	0	1	7
Ontario (Rizzo)	0	3	0	1	0	1	1	0	6

==== Gold medal game ====
Saturday, December 10, 3:30 pm

Sheet 3	1	2	3	4	5	6	7	8	Final
Saskatchewan (Anderson)	0	1	2	1	0	1	2	X	7
Quebec (Osborne) 🔨	1	0	0	0	2	0	0	X	3
