= 1999 Ontario Nokia Cup =

- Host city: Brantford, Ontario
- Arena: Brantford & District Civic Centre
- Dates: February 8-14
- Winner: Team Moffatt
- Curling club: Rideau Curling Club, Ottawa, Ontario
- Skip: Rich Moffatt
- Third: Howard Rajala
- Second: Chris Fulton
- Lead: Paul Madden
- Finalist: Phil Daniel

The 1999 Nokia Cup, southern Ontario men's provincial curling championship was held February 8–14 at the Brantford & District Civic Centre in Brantford, Ontario. The winning rink of Rich Moffatt, Howard Rajala, Chris Fulton and Paul Madden from Ottawa would go on to represent Ontario at the 1999 Labatt Brier in Edmonton, Alberta.

== Teams ==
The teams included eight regional winners, two challenge round winners, the defending Brier champion and World champion Wayne Middaugh rink and the 1998 Olympic silver medallist Mike Harris rink.

Skip	Third	Second	Lead	Club
Rich Moffatt	Howard Rajala	Chris Fulton	Paul Madden	Rideau Curling Club, Ottawa
Phil Daniel	Kevin Daniel	Pete Dekoning	Chris Lumbard	Tilbury Curling Club, Tilbury
Wayne Middaugh	Graeme McCarrel	Ian Tetley	Scott Bailey	St. George's Golf and Country Club, Etobicoke
John Base	Craig Kochan	Joe Frans	Greg Balsdon	Oakville Curling Club, Oakville
Mike Harris	Richard Hart	Collin Mitchell	George Karrys	Tam Heather Curling Club, Scarborough
Bryan Cochrane	Bill Gamble	Ian MacAulay	Mike Pastuch	Morrisburg Curling Club, Morrisburg
Nick Rizzo	Heath McCormick	Ken McDermot	Scott Arnold	Brant Curling Club, Brantford
Ian Robertson	Bob LeClair	Paul Wadland	Dean Wadland	Thornhill Golf & Country Club, Thornhill
Murray Shannon	Doug Gibson	Shawn Kaufman	Peter Irwin	Hanover Curling Club, Hanover
Peter Mellor	Jeff Thompson	James Bromiley	James Wark	Chesley Curling Club, Chesley
Jim O'Marra	Keith Furevich	Bill Harrison	Dave Clark	Peterborough Curling Club, Peterborough
Roy Walker	Warren Craig	John Russell	Mike Myler	Brampton Curling Club, Brampton

== Standings ==
Key
Teams to Playoffs
Teams to Tiebreaker

Skip	Club	Wins	Losses
Rich Moffatt	Rideau Curling Club	10	1
Wayne Middaugh	St. George's Golf and Country Club	8	3
Phil Daniel	Tilbury Golf & Curling Club	8	3
John Base	Oakville Curling Club	8	3
Mike Harris	Tam Heather Country Club	6	5
Bryan Cochrane	Morrisburg Curling Club	5	6
Nick Rizzo	Brant Curling Club	5	6
Ian Robertson	Thornhill Country Club	5	6
Murray Shannon	Hanover Curling Club	4	7
Peter Mellor	Chesley Curling Club	3	8
Jim O'Marra	Peterborough Curling Club	3	8
Roy Walker	Brampton Curling Club	1	10

== Tie Breaker ==
February 13, 2:00pm

Team	1	2	3	4	5	6	7	8	9	10	Final
John Base	1	0	0	0	2	0	X	X	X	X	3
Phil Daniel	0	2	1	2	0	5	X	X	X	X	10

== Playoffs ==
Semifinal			Final
			1	Rich Moffatt	8
2	Wayne Middaugh	7	3	Phil Daniel	3
3	Phil Daniel	12

=== Semifinal ===
February 13, 7:00pm

Team	1	2	3	4	5	6	7	8	9	10	Final
Wayne Middaugh	2	0	0	1	0	2	0	2	0	X	7
Phil Daniel	0	2	1	0	3	0	4	0	2	X	12

=== Final ===
February 14, 2:30pm

Team	1	2	3	4	5	6	7	8	9	10	Final
Rich Moffatt	1	0	0	2	0	3	1	0	1	X	8
Phil Daniel	0	0	1	0	1	0	0	1	0	X	3
