= 2013 Canadian Senior Curling Championships – Men's tournament =

2013 Canadian Senior Curling Championships Men's tournament
- Host city: Summerside, Prince Edward Island
- Arena: Silver Fox Curling & Yacht Club
- Dates: March 16–24
- Winner: New Brunswick
- Curling club: Capital Winter Club, Fredericton
- Skip: Wayne Tallon
- Third: Mike Kennedy
- Second: Mike Flannery
- Lead: Wade Blanchard
- Finalist: Ontario (Howard Rajala)

The men's tournament of the 2013 Canadian Senior Curling Championships was held from March 16 to 24 at the Silver Fox Curling & Yacht Club in Summerside, Prince Edward Island.

== Qualifying round ==
Four associations did not automatically qualify to the championships, and participated in a qualifying round. Two qualification spots were awarded to the winners of the double knockout round, Nova Scotia and the Northwest Territories.

=== Teams ===
The teams are listed as follows:

Province	Skip	Third	Second	Lead	Locale
Northwest Territories	Glen Hudy	Brian Kelln	Ben McDonald	Richard Klarowich	Yellowknife Curling Club, Yellowknife
Nova Scotia	Alan O'Leary	Andy Dauphinee	Danny Christianson	Harold McCarthy	CFB Halifax Curling Club, Halifax
Nunavut	Ed Sattelberger	Dennis Masson	Bob Acorn	Lloyd Kendell	Iqaluit Curling Club, Iqaluit
Yukon	Ray Mikkelsen	Darol Stuart	Walter Wallingham	Dale Enzenauer	Whitehorse Curling Club, Whitehorse

=== Knockout brackets ===
Semifinals			Qualifier 1
1	Nova Scotia	11
4	Nunavut	1	1	Nova Scotia	8
2	Yukon	11	2	Yukon	7
3	Northwest Territories	6

Semifinals			Qualifier 2
			2	Yukon	5
3	Northwest Territories	8	3	Northwest Territories	8
4	Nunavut	2

=== Knockout results ===
==== First knockout ====
Thursday, March 14, 2:30 pm

Sheet 1	1	2	3	4	5	6	7	8	9	10	Final
Nova Scotia (O'Leary)	1	0	2	2	2	0	4	X	X	X	11
Nunavut (Sattelberger)	0	0	0	0	0	1	0	X	X	X	1

Sheet 2	1	2	3	4	5	6	7	8	9	10	Final
Yukon (Mikkelsen)	1	0	3	4	0	0	3	X	X	X	11
Northwest Territories (Hudy)	0	3	0	0	1	2	0	X	X	X	6

Thursday, March 14, 7:00 pm

Sheet 3	1	2	3	4	5	6	7	8	9	10	11	Final
Nova Scotia (O'Leary)	0	1	1	0	2	0	1	0	2	0	1	8
Yukon (Mikkelsen)	1	0	0	2	0	1	0	2	0	1	0	7

==== Second knockout ====
Thursday, March 14, 7:00 pm

Sheet 4	1	2	3	4	5	6	7	8	9	10	Final
Northwest Territories (Hudy)	1	1	0	0	2	2	0	2	X	X	8
Nunavut (Sattelberger)	0	0	0	1	0	0	1	0	X	X	2

Friday, March 15, 8:00 am

Sheet 5	1	2	3	4	5	6	7	8	9	10	Final
Yukon (Mikkelsen)	0	1	0	2	0	0	1	0	1	X	5
Northwest Territories (Hudy)	0	0	3	0	1	1	0	3	0	X	8

== Teams ==
The teams are listed as follows:

Province	Skip	Third	Second	Lead	Locale(s)
Alberta	Wade White	Doug McLennan	Dan Holowaychuk	George Parsons	St. Albert Curling Club, St. Albert
British Columbia	Craig Lepine	Stan Walker	Berry Breton	Craig McLeod	Langley Curling Club, Langley
Manitoba	Bob Sigurdson	Darren Oryniak	Al Purdy	Wayne Sigurdson	West Kildonan Curling Club, Winnipeg
New Brunswick	Wayne Tallon	Mike Kennedy	Mike Flannery	Wade Blanchard	Capital Winter Club, Fredericton
Newfoundland and Labrador	Geoff Cunningham (fourth)	Glenn Goss (skip)	Rob Thomas	Gary Tiller	Re/MAX Centre, St. John's
Northern Ontario	Bruce Munro	Duncan Bell	Drew Eloranta	John Querney	Idylwylde Golf & Curling Club, Sudbury
Northwest Territories	Glen Hudy	Brian Kelln	Ben McDonald	Richard Klarowich	Yellowknife Curling Club, Yellowknife
Nova Scotia	Alan O'Leary	Andy Dauphinee	Danny Christianson	Harold McCarthy	CFB Halifax Curling Club, Halifax
Ontario	Howard Rajala	Rich Moffatt	Doug Johnston	Ken Sullivan	Rideau Curling Club, Ottawa
Prince Edward Island	Rod MacDonald	John Likely	Mark O'Rourke	Peter MacDonald	Charlottetown Curling Complex, Charlottetown
Quebec	Robert Maclean	Marlo Tremblay	Daniel Gilbert	Dan Belliveau	Club de curling Boucherville, Boucherville; Hudson Legion Curling Club, Hudson
Saskatchewan	Gord Bell	Brad Law	Maurel Erick	Gord Fritzler	Callie Curling Club, Regina

== Round robin standings ==
Final Round Robin Standings

Key
Teams to Playoffs
Teams to Tiebreaker

Province	Skip	W	L
New Brunswick	Wayne Tallon	10	1
Alberta	Wade White	9	2
Prince Edward Island	Rod MacDonald	8	3
Ontario	Howard Rajala	8	3
Nova Scotia	Alan O'Leary	6	5
Quebec	Robert Maclean	5	6
Manitoba	Bob Sigurdson	5	6
British Columbia	Craig Lepine	4	7
Saskatchewan	Gord Bell	4	7
Newfoundland and Labrador	Glenn Goss	4	7
Northern Ontario	Bruce Munro	3	8
Northwest Territories	Glen Hudy	0	11

== Round robin results ==
All draw times are listed in Atlantic Daylight Time (UTC-3).

=== Draw 2 ===
Saturday, March 16, 2:30 pm

Sheet A	1	2	3	4	5	6	7	8	9	10	Final
Newfoundland and Labrador (Goss)	1	1	1	0	1	0	1	0	0	1	6
Quebec (Maclean)	0	0	0	2	0	2	0	1	0	0	5

Sheet B	1	2	3	4	5	6	7	8	9	10	Final
Alberta (White)	0	2	2	1	0	0	2	0	0	0	7
Prince Edward Island (MacDonald)	1	0	0	0	3	1	0	1	3	1	10

Sheet C	1	2	3	4	5	6	7	8	9	10	Final
Nova Scotia (O'Leary)	1	0	1	0	2	0	1	0	3	X	8
Northern Ontario (Munro)	0	1	0	2	0	0	0	1	0	X	4

Sheet D	1	2	3	4	5	6	7	8	9	10	Final
Northwest Territories (Hudy)	2	0	2	0	0	0	0	1	X	X	5
British Columbia (Lepine)	0	1	0	2	2	1	4	0	X	X	10

Sheet E	1	2	3	4	5	6	7	8	9	10	Final
Manitoba (Sigurdson)	0	2	0	1	0	2	0	1	0	1	7
Ontario (Rajala)	2	0	1	0	3	0	1	0	1	0	8

Sheet F	1	2	3	4	5	6	7	8	9	10	Final
Saskatchewan (Bell)	0	0	1	0	0	1	0	2	0	X	4
New Brunswick (Tallon)	0	1	0	2	1	0	1	0	2	X	7

=== Draw 4 ===
Sunday, March 17, 10:00 am

Sheet A	1	2	3	4	5	6	7	8	9	10	Final
Northwest Territories (Hudy)	0	1	0	0	1	0	1	X	X	X	3
Manitoba (Sigurdson)	2	0	4	3	0	3	0	X	X	X	12

Sheet B	1	2	3	4	5	6	7	8	9	10	Final
British Columbia (Lepine)	1	0	2	1	0	0	0	0	0	0	4
Nova Scotia (O'Leary)	0	1	0	0	2	1	0	1	1	2	8

Sheet C	1	2	3	4	5	6	7	8	9	10	Final
Saskatchewan (Bell)	0	0	1	2	1	0	0	0	3	X	7
Newfoundland and Labrador (Goss)	0	1	0	0	0	0	1	1	0	X	3

Sheet D	1	2	3	4	5	6	7	8	9	10	Final
Prince Edward Island (MacDonald)	0	1	1	0	1	0	0	0	1	0	4
New Brunswick (Tallon)	2	0	0	2	0	0	1	1	0	1	7

Sheet E	1	2	3	4	5	6	7	8	9	10	Final
Alberta (White)	1	2	0	1	1	0	0	1	0	1	7
Quebec (Maclean)	0	0	1	0	0	2	1	0	2	0	6

Sheet F	1	2	3	4	5	6	7	8	9	10	Final
Northern Ontario (Munro)	0	1	0	1	2	0	1	0	0	0	5
Ontario (Rajala)	1	0	1	0	0	2	0	2	1	1	8

=== Draw 5 ===
Sunday, March 17, 2:30 pm

Sheet A	1	2	3	4	5	6	7	8	9	10	Final
British Columbia (Lepine)	0	3	1	0	0	0	0	0	1	0	5
Prince Edward Island (MacDonald)	0	0	0	1	3	1	1	1	0	1	8

Sheet B	1	2	3	4	5	6	7	8	9	10	Final
Saskatchewan (Bell)	0	1	0	1	0	1	1	1	0	X	5
Quebec (Maclean)	1	0	3	0	5	0	0	0	0	X	9

Sheet D	1	2	3	4	5	6	7	8	9	10	Final
Manitoba (Sigurdson)	1	1	1	0	0	2	0	3	X	X	8
Northern Ontario (Munro)	0	0	0	1	0	0	1	0	X	X	2

=== Draw 6 ===
Sunday, March 17, 7:00 pm

Sheet C	1	2	3	4	5	6	7	8	9	10	Final
Northwest Territories (Hudy)	0	0	3	0	0	2	0	0	X	X	5
Ontario (Rajala)	2	4	0	0	3	0	2	1	X	X	12

Sheet E	1	2	3	4	5	6	7	8	9	10	Final
Nova Scotia (O'Leary)	0	0	0	0	1	0	1	1	0	X	3
New Brunswick (Tallon)	0	0	2	1	0	2	0	0	2	X	7

Sheet F	1	2	3	4	5	6	7	8	9	10	Final
Newfoundland and Labrador (Goss)	0	2	0	0	3	0	2	0	1	0	8
Alberta (White)	1	0	1	1	0	2	0	2	0	3	10

=== Draw 7 ===
Monday, March 18, 10:00 am

Sheet A	1	2	3	4	5	6	7	8	9	10	Final
Quebec (Maclean)	2	0	2	0	1	0	0	1	1	1	8
Northern Ontario (Munro)	0	1	0	3	0	1	1	0	0	0	6

Sheet C	1	2	3	4	5	6	7	8	9	10	11	Final
Manitoba (Sigurdson)	0	2	0	0	2	0	0	0	1	1	1	7
Prince Edward Island (MacDonald)	1	0	1	1	0	2	0	1	0	0	0	6

Sheet E	1	2	3	4	5	6	7	8	9	10	Final
Saskatchewan (Bell)	1	0	1	1	0	0	0	0	2	0	5
British Columbia (Lepine)	0	1	0	0	1	2	0	0	0	2	6

=== Draw 8 ===
Monday, March 18, 2:30 pm

Sheet B	1	2	3	4	5	6	7	8	9	10	Final
New Brunswick (Tallon)	0	0	1	0	3	0	4	0	0	1	9
Alberta (White)	1	0	0	1	0	2	0	2	2	0	7

Sheet D	1	2	3	4	5	6	7	8	9	10	Final
Ontario (Rajala)	2	0	2	0	0	1	1	0	2	X	8
Newfoundland and Labrador (Goss)	0	1	0	2	1	0	0	1	0	X	5

Sheet F	1	2	3	4	5	6	7	8	9	10	Final
Nova Scotia (O'Leary)	0	1	0	2	0	1	3	0	1	X	8
Northwest Territories (Hudy)	1	0	0	0	3	0	0	1	0	X	5

=== Draw 9 ===
Monday, March 18, 7:00 pm

Sheet D	1	2	3	4	5	6	7	8	9	10	Final
British Columbia (Lepine)	2	0	2	0	0	0	1	1	0	0	6
Quebec (Maclean)	0	1	0	0	2	1	0	0	2	1	7

Sheet E	1	2	3	4	5	6	7	8	9	10	Final
Northern Ontario (Munro)	0	2	0	1	0	0	0	0	X	X	3
Prince Edward Island (MacDonald)	1	0	3	0	1	1	1	3	X	X	10

Sheet F	1	2	3	4	5	6	7	8	9	10	Final
Manitoba (Sigurdson)	2	0	0	1	0	2	0	2	0	0	7
Saskatchewan (Bell)	0	1	1	0	1	0	2	0	2	1	8

=== Draw 10 ===
Tuesday, March 19, 10:00 am

Sheet A	1	2	3	4	5	6	7	8	9	10	Final
New Brunswick (Tallon)	0	0	1	0	1	0	0	1	0	0	3
Ontario (Rajala)	1	0	0	1	0	1	1	0	1	1	6

Sheet B	1	2	3	4	5	6	7	8	9	10	Final
Newfoundland and Labrador (Goss)	0	2	0	0	6	0	4	X	X	X	12
Northwest Territories (Hudy)	1	0	1	1	0	1	0	X	X	X	4

Sheet C	1	2	3	4	5	6	7	8	9	10	11	Final
Alberta (White)	0	1	0	0	0	3	0	1	0	3	1	9
Nova Scotia (O'Leary)	2	0	2	1	0	0	2	0	1	0	0	8

=== Draw 11 ===
Tuesday, March 19, 2:30 pm

Sheet D	1	2	3	4	5	6	7	8	9	10	Final
Saskatchewan (Bell)	2	0	0	0	0	1	0	X	X	X	3
Prince Edward Island (MacDonald)	0	3	1	2	3	0	0	X	X	X	9

Sheet E	1	2	3	4	5	6	7	8	9	10	Final
Quebec (Maclean)	0	1	1	0	1	0	2	0	2	X	7
Manitoba (Sigurdson)	2	0	0	1	0	1	0	1	0	X	5

Sheet F	1	2	3	4	5	6	7	8	9	10	Final
British Columbia (Lepine)	1	0	0	0	1	0	1	0	X	X	3
Northern Ontario (Munro)	0	1	1	2	0	1	0	4	X	X	9

=== Draw 12 ===
Tuesday, March 19, 7:00 pm

Sheet A	1	2	3	4	5	6	7	8	9	10	Final
Alberta (White)	1	0	1	1	1	0	1	0	3	1	9
Northwest Territories (Hudy)	0	1	0	0	0	2	0	4	0	0	7

Sheet B	1	2	3	4	5	6	7	8	9	10	Final
Nova Scotia (O'Leary)	1	3	0	3	0	1	1	X	X	X	9
Ontario (Rajala)	0	0	0	0	1	0	0	X	X	X	1

Sheet C	1	2	3	4	5	6	7	8	9	10	Final
Newfoundland and Labrador (Goss)	0	0	0	1	0	1	1	0	X	X	3
New Brunswick (Tallon)	0	2	0	0	2	0	0	5	X	X	9

=== Draw 13 ===
Wednesday, March 20, 10:00 am

Sheet B	1	2	3	4	5	6	7	8	9	10	Final
Manitoba (Sigurdson)	0	0	0	2	0	0	1	1	0	X	4
British Columbia (Lepine)	0	3	0	0	2	2	0	0	1	X	8

Sheet C	1	2	3	4	5	6	7	8	9	10	Final
Northern Ontario (Munro)	3	0	2	0	4	0	1	2	X	X	12
Saskatchewan (Bell)	0	1	0	2	0	1	0	0	X	X	4

Sheet F	1	2	3	4	5	6	7	8	9	10	Final
Quebec (Maclean)	1	0	0	0	0	1	0	1	1	0	4
Prince Edward Island (MacDonald)	0	1	1	0	0	0	2	0	0	1	5

=== Draw 14 ===
Wednesday, March 20, 2:30 pm

Sheet A	1	2	3	4	5	6	7	8	9	10	Final
Nova Scotia (O'Leary)	0	2	0	3	0	1	0	4	0	X	10
Newfoundland and Labrador (Goss)	1	0	1	0	2	0	1	0	3	X	8

Sheet D	1	2	3	4	5	6	7	8	9	10	Final
New Brunswick (Tallon)	3	0	2	1	0	0	0	2	1	X	9
Northwest Territories (Hudy)	0	1	0	0	0	0	2	0	0	X	3

Sheet E	1	2	3	4	5	6	7	8	9	10	11	Final
Ontario (Rajala)	0	1	0	0	2	0	1	0	0	2	0	6
Alberta (White)	0	0	1	1	0	1	0	0	3	0	2	8

=== Draw 16 ===
Thursday, March 21, 8:00 am

Sheet A	1	2	3	4	5	6	7	8	9	10	Final
Ontario (Rajala)	3	0	0	2	0	0	2	0	3	X	10
British Columbia (Lepine)	0	1	1	0	1	1	0	2	0	X	6

Sheet B	1	2	3	4	5	6	7	8	9	10	Final
Quebec (Maclean)	1	0	1	0	0	0	3	1	0	0	6
New Brunswick (Tallon)	0	4	0	0	1	0	0	0	0	2	7

Sheet C	1	2	3	4	5	6	7	8	9	10	Final
Prince Edward Island (MacDonald)	1	1	0	2	1	1	1	X	X	X	7
Northwest Territories (Hudy)	0	0	1	0	0	0	0	X	X	X	1

Sheet D	1	2	3	4	5	6	7	8	9	10	Final
Nova Scotia (O'Leary)	0	1	0	0	1	0	2	1	0	0	5
Saskatchewan (Bell)	2	0	1	1	0	1	0	0	2	3	10

Sheet E	1	2	3	4	5	6	7	8	9	10	Final
Newfoundland and Labrador (Goss)	2	1	0	1	2	0	0	2	2	X	10
Northern Ontario (Munro)	0	0	1	0	0	2	1	0	0	X	4

Sheet F	1	2	3	4	5	6	7	8	9	10	11	Final
Alberta (White)	0	1	1	0	2	0	1	0	2	0	1	8
Manitoba (Sigurdson)	0	0	0	2	0	2	0	1	0	2	0	7

=== Draw 18 ===
Thursday, March 21, 4:00 pm

Sheet A	1	2	3	4	5	6	7	8	9	10	Final
Northern Ontario (Munro)	0	1	0	2	0	2	0	1	0	X	6
New Brunswick (Tallon)	3	0	1	0	1	0	3	0	1	X	9

Sheet B	1	2	3	4	5	6	7	8	9	10	Final
Ontario (Rajala)	1	0	2	0	0	2	0	1	0	5	11
Saskatchewan (Bell)	0	2	0	1	1	0	1	0	2	0	7

Sheet C	1	2	3	4	5	6	7	8	9	10	Final
British Columbia (Lepine)	1	0	0	1	0	1	0	2	0	X	5
Alberta (White)	0	0	1	0	3	0	1	0	2	X	7

Sheet D	1	2	3	4	5	6	7	8	9	10	Final
Newfoundland and Labrador (Goss)	0	0	0	0	0	1	0	X	X	X	1
Manitoba (Sigurdson)	4	2	2	1	1	0	1	X	X	X	11

Sheet E	1	2	3	4	5	6	7	8	9	10	Final
Prince Edward Island (MacDonald)	0	1	0	2	0	2	0	2	1	X	8
Nova Scotia (O'Leary)	1	0	2	0	1	0	2	0	0	X	6

Sheet F	1	2	3	4	5	6	7	8	9	10	Final
Northwest Territories (Hudy)	0	2	0	1	0	1	0	1	0	X	5
Quebec (Maclean)	0	0	1	0	4	0	2	0	3	X	10

=== Draw 20 ===
Friday, March 22, 10:00 am

Sheet A	1	2	3	4	5	6	7	8	9	10	Final
Saskatchewan (Bell)	1	0	0	1	2	0	1	0	2	0	7
Alberta (White)	0	2	3	0	0	1	0	1	0	1	8

Sheet B	1	2	3	4	5	6	7	8	9	10	Final
Northwest Territories (Hudy)	0	1	0	0	0	2	1	0	X	X	4
Northern Ontario (Munro)	2	0	2	1	3	0	0	6	X	X	14

Sheet C	1	2	3	4	5	6	7	8	9	10	Final
New Brunswick (Tallon)	0	2	0	0	1	0	1	2	0	1	7
Manitoba (Sigurdson)	1	0	1	0	0	1	0	0	1	0	4

Sheet D	1	2	3	4	5	6	7	8	9	10	11	Final
Quebec (Maclean)	0	1	0	0	0	1	0	2	0	1	0	5
Nova Scotia (O'Leary)	1	0	0	1	0	0	2	0	1	0	1	6

Sheet E	1	2	3	4	5	6	7	8	9	10	11	Final
British Columbia (Lepine)	0	1	0	1	0	1	0	2	0	3	1	9
Newfoundland and Labrador (Goss)	1	0	1	0	1	0	4	0	1	0	0	8

Sheet F	1	2	3	4	5	6	7	8	9	10	Final
Prince Edward Island (MacDonald)	0	2	2	1	0	3	0	0	0	0	8
Ontario (Rajala)	2	0	0	0	1	0	1	1	1	1	7

=== Draw 22 ===
Friday, March 22, 7:00 pm

Sheet A	1	2	3	4	5	6	7	8	9	10	Final
Manitoba (Sigurdson)	1	0	3	0	2	0	2	0	3	X	11
Nova Scotia (O'Leary)	0	1	0	4	0	2	0	1	0	X	8

Sheet B	1	2	3	4	5	6	7	8	9	10	Final
Prince Edward Island (MacDonald)	2	0	1	0	0	2	0	0	1	0	6
Newfoundland and Labrador (Goss)	0	1	0	1	1	0	2	1	0	1	7

Sheet C	1	2	3	4	5	6	7	8	9	10	Final
Ontario (Rajala)	1	0	0	0	2	2	1	4	X	X	10
Quebec (Maclean)	0	0	1	1	0	0	0	0	X	X	2

Sheet D	1	2	3	4	5	6	7	8	9	10	Final
Northern Ontario (Munro)	1	0	1	0	3	1	0	0	0	X	6
Alberta (White)	0	3	0	2	0	0	1	2	1	X	9

Sheet E	1	2	3	4	5	6	7	8	9	10	Final
Northwest Territories (Hudy)	0	1	0	1	0	0	1	0	X	X	3
Saskatchewan (Bell)	0	0	4	0	2	1	0	3	X	X	10

Sheet F	1	2	3	4	5	6	7	8	9	10	Final
New Brunswick (Tallon)	0	2	0	0	2	0	3	0	4	X	11
British Columbia (Lepine)	1	0	1	1	0	1	0	2	0	X	6

== Tiebreaker ==
Saturday, March 23, 8:00 am

Sheet D	1	2	3	4	5	6	7	8	9	10	Final
Prince Edward Island (MacDonald)	0	0	0	0	1	0	X	X	X	X	1
Ontario (Rajala)	1	1	2	2	0	4	X	X	X	X	10

== Playoffs ==
Semifinal			Final
			1	New Brunswick	11
2	Alberta	5	3	Ontario	3
3	Ontario	11

=== Semifinal ===
Saturday, March 23, 7:00 pm

Sheet C	1	2	3	4	5	6	7	8	9	10	Final
Alberta (White)	0	2	0	2	0	0	1	0	X	X	5
Ontario (Rajala)	2	0	2	0	1	2	0	4	X	X	11

=== Final ===
Sunday, March 24, 11:00 am

Sheet D	1	2	3	4	5	6	7	8	9	10	Final
New Brunswick (Tallon)	0	2	1	3	0	4	0	1	X	X	11
Ontario (Rajala)	0	0	0	0	1	0	2	0	X	X	3
