= 2017 Canadian Senior Curling Championships =

- Host city: Fredericton, New Brunswick
- Arena: Capital Winter Club; Willie O'Ree Place
- Dates: March 20–25, 2017
- Men's winner: Alberta
- Curling club: Saville Community SC, Edmonton
- Skip: Wade White
- Third: Barry Chwedoruk
- Second: Dan Holowaychuk
- Lead: George White
- Finalist: Ontario (Howard Rajala)
- Women's winner: Saskatchewan
- Curling club: Nutana CC, Saskatoon
- Skip: Sherry Anderson
- Third: Patty Hersikorn
- Second: Brenda Goertzen
- Lead: Anita Silvernagle
- Finalist: Ontario (Jo-Ann Rizzo)

The 2017 Canadian Senior Curling Championships were held March 20 to 25, 2017 in Fredericton, New Brunswick.

== Men's ==
=== Teams ===
The teams are listed as follows:

Province	Skip	Third	Second	Lead	Club(s)
Alberta	Wade White	Barry Chwedoruk	Dan Holowaychuk	George White	Saville Community SC, Edmonton
British Columbia	Greg Lepine	Stan Walker	Craig Mcleod	Mike Pelech	Cloverdale CC, Surrey, Vancouver CC, Vancouver & Penticton CC, Penticton
Manitoba	Murray Warren	Brian Barker	Terry Warren	Reg Warren	Brandon CC, Brandon
New Brunswick	Terry Odishaw	Mike Kennedy	Marc LeCocq	Grant Odishaw	Curl Moncton, Moncton
Newfoundland and Labrador	Mark Noseworthy	Alex Smith	Peter Hollett	Ross Young	Re/MAX Centre, St. John's
Northern Ontario	Robbie Gordon	Ron Henderson	Dion Dumontelle	Doug Hong	Sudbury CC, Sudbury
Northwest Territories	Mel Sittichinli	Edgar Maring	George Greenland	Hans Lennie	Inuvik CC, Inuvik
Nova Scotia	Alan O'Leary	Stuart MacLean	Danny Christianson	Harold McCarthy	Dartmouth CC, Dartmouth
Nunavut	Ed Sattelberger	Dennis Masson	Chris West	Ed North	Iqaluit CC, Iqaluit
Ontario	Howard Rajala	Rich Moffatt	Chris Fulton	Paul Madden	Rideau CC, Ottawa
Prince Edward Island	Phil Gorveatt	Kevin Champion	Mike Dillion	Mark Butler	Charlottetown CC, Charlottetown
Quebec	Robert McLean	Tom Wharry	Éric Gravel	Dan Belliveau	Hudson Legion CC, Hudson, Glenmore CC, Dollard-des-Ormeaux & Rosemère CC, Rosemère
Saskatchewan	Darrell McKee	Mark Lane	Tony Korol	Rodney Atonichuk	Nutana CC, Saskatoon
Yukon	Pat Paslawski	Terry Miller	George Hilderman (skip)	Don McPhee	Whitehorse CC, Whitehorse

=== Round Robin Standings ===
Final Round Robin Standings

Key
Teams to Championship Pool

Pool A	Skip	W	L
Quebec	Robert McLean	5	1
Ontario	Howard Rajala	4	2
Newfoundland and Labrador	Mark Noseworthy	3	3
Prince Edward Island	Phil Gorveatt	3	3
British Columbia	Greg Lepine	3	3
Yukon	Pat Paslawski	2	4
Nunavut	Ed Sattelberger	1	5

Pool B	Skip	W	L
New Brunswick	Terry Odishaw	6	0
Northern Ontario	Robbie Gordon	3	3
Alberta	Wade White	3	3
Manitoba	Murray Warren	3	3
Saskatchewan	Darrell McKee	3	3
Nova Scotia	Alan O'Leary	3	3
Northwest Territories	Mel Sittichinli	0	6

=== Championship Pool Standings ===
Final Round Robin Standings

Key
Teams to Playoffs

Province	Skip	W	L
New Brunswick	Terry Odishaw	10	0
Alberta	Wade White	7	3
Quebec	Robert McLean	7	3
Ontario	Howard Rajala	6	4
Northern Ontario	Robbie Gordon	5	5
Manitoba	Murray Warren	5	5
Prince Edward Island	Phil Gorevatt	3	6
Newfoundland and Labrador	Mark Noseworthy	3	7

=== Seeding Pool Standings ===
Final Standings

Province	Skip	W	L
Saskatchewan	Darrell McKee	6	3
Nova Scotia	Alan O'Leary	6	3
British Columbia	Greg Lepine	4	5
Yukon	Pat Paslawski	3	6
Nunavut	Ed Sattelberger	2	7
Northwest Territories	Mel Sittichinli	0	9

=== Playoffs ===
Semifinal
1	New Brunswick	5
4	Ontario	7
2	Alberta	10
3	Quebec	3

Final
4	Ontario	6
2	Alberta	7

Bronze Medal Game
1	New Brunswick	6
3	Quebec	5

== Women ==
=== Teams ===
The teams are listed as follows:

Province	Skip	Third	Second	Lead	Club(s)
Alberta	Cathy King	Glenys Bakker	Lesley McEwan	Shannon Nimmo	Saville SC, Edmonton
British Columbia	Lynne Noble	Penny Shantz	Colleen Robson	Kathy Branch	Qualicum & District CC, Qualicum Beach
Manitoba	Terry Ursel	Gwen Wooley	Tracy Igonia	Brenda Walker	Arden Lansdowne CC, Arden
New Brunswick	Kathy Hicks	Alexa Washburn	Brenda Stirling	Eleanor Murray	Capital WC, Fredericton
Newfoundland and Labrador	Diane Roberts	Heather Martin	Patricia Tiller	Candy Thomas	Re/MAX Centre, St. John's
Northern Ontario	Peggy Taylor	Lisa Penner	Arline Wilcox	Tracy Stasiuk	Kenora CC, Kenora
Northwest Territories	Debbie Moss	Marta Moir	Terry Fisher	Cheryl Tordoff	Yellowknife CC, Yellowknife
Nova Scotia	Mary Mattatall	Marg Cutcliffe	Jill Alcoe-Holland	Andrea Saulnier	Windsor CC, Windsor
Ontario	Jo-Ann Rizzo	Kerry Lackie	Kristin Turcotte	Julie McMullin	Brantford G&CC, Brantford
Prince Edward Island	Shelly Ebbett	Kim Pippy	Karen Hardy	Sandy Hope	Charlottetown CC, Charlottetown
Quebec	Anne Hardy	Chantal Ouellette	Brigitte Gosselin	Pierrette Houle	CS Celanese, Drummondville, CC Sherbrooke, Sherbrooke & CC Laurier, Victoriaville
Saskatchewan	Sherry Anderson	Patty Hersikorn	Brenda Goertzen	Anita Silvernagle	Nutana CC, Saskatoon
Yukon	Darlene Gammel	Val Boxall	Maureen Birckel	Frances Taylor	Whitehorse CC, Whitehorse

=== Round Robin Standings ===
Final Round Robin Standings

Key
Teams to Championship Pool

Pool A	Skip	W	L
Manitoba	Terry Ursel	5	1
Northern Ontario	Peggy Taylor	4	2
Saskatchewan	Sherry Anderson	4	2
Alberta	Cathy King	3	3
Newfoundland and Labrador	Diane Roberts	2	4
Quebec	Anne Hardy	2	4
Northwest Territories	Debbie Moss	1	5

Pool B	Skip	W	L
British Columbia	Lynne Noble	5	0
Ontario	Jo-Ann Rizzo	4	1
Nova Scotia	Mary Mattatall	3	2
New Brunswick	Kathy Hicks	2	3
Prince Edward Island	Shelly Ebbett	1	4
Yukon	Darlene Gammel	0	5

=== Championship Pool Standings ===
Final Round Robin Standings

Key
Teams to Playoffs

Province	Skip	W	L
Alberta	Cathy King	5	2
British Columbia	Lynne Noble	5	2
Ontario	Jo-Ann Rizzo	5	2
Saskatchewan	Sherry Anderson	4	3
Nova Scotia	Mary Mattatall	3	4
Northern Ontario	Peggy Taylor	3	4
Manitoba	Terry Ursel	3	4
New Brunswick	Kathy Hicks	0	7

=== Seeding Pool Standings ===
Final Round Robin Standings

Province	Skip	W	L
Quebec	Anne Hardy	3	1
Newfoundland and Labrador	Diane Roberts	3	1
Prince Edward Island	Shelly Ebbett	2	2
Northwest Territories	Debbie Moss	2	2
Yukon	Darlene Gammel	0	4

=== Playoffs ===
Semifinal
1	Alberta	4
4	Saskatchewan	9
2	British Columbia	3
3	Ontario	8

Final
4	Saskatchewan	7
3	Ontario	3

Bronze Medal Game
1	Alberta	3
2	British Columbia	6
