= Theresa Breen =

Canadian curler

- Curler
- Born: December 4, 1965 (age 60); Kingston, Ontario

Team
- Curling club: Halifax CC, Halifax, NS
- Skip: Theresa Breen
- Third: Kerri Denny
- Second: Jayne Flinn-Burton
- Lead: Mary Sue Radford

Curling career
- Member Association: Ontario (1981–2008); Nova Scotia (2008–present)
- Hearts: 4 (1993, 1994, 1998, 2000)
Medal record
Women's curling
Representing Ontario
Scotties Tournament of Hearts
Silver medal – second place	1998 Regina
Silver medal – second place	2000 Prince George
Bronze medal – third place	1993 Brandon

Theresa Breen (born December 4, 1965) is a Canadian curler from Bedford, Nova Scotia. She currently skips her own team out of Halifax, Nova Scotia.

== Curling career ==
In her youth, Breen won a provincial schoolgirl title in 1982, and made the Ontario junior finals playing third for Suzanne Herron. While attending Queen's University, Kingston, she won the Ontario Women's Interuniversity Association Championship.

Breen was the long-time third for the Anne Merklinger rink in the 1990s, joining the team in 1992. As a member of that team, she would win four provincial championships, and would play in four Scott Tournament of Hearts, representing Ontario. Her first Hearts appearance was in 1993, where the team won a bronze medal, after losing to Manitoba's Maureen Bonar in the semi-final. The team returned to the Hearts the following year, but missed the playoffs after winning just 4 round robin games. The team returned to the Hearts in 1998, making it all the way to the final before losing to Alberta's Cathy Borst to settle for silver. Breen's final Hearts appearance was in 2000 where the team once again made it all the way to the final before losing, this time to British Columbia's Kelley Law rink.

In 1996, Breen won an Ontario Mixed title playing third with Rich Moffatt. The team went on to lose the final of the 1996 Canadian Mixed Curling Championship. In 1997, as a member of the Merklinger rink, Breen played in the 1997 Canadian Olympic Curling Trials, just missing the playoffs.

Breen moved to Nova Scotia in the mid-2000s, and would join the Mary-Anne Arsenault rink for the 2008-09 season, throwing lead rocks. Breen would play in her first and only Grand Slam event that season, the 2008 Sobeys Slam, where they lost in the quarterfinal. Breen would go on to form her own team after the season.

In 2011, Breen won the Nova Scotia Mixed title playing lead for Paul Flemming.

In 2014, Breen returned to play on the World Curling Tour. Breen would skip a team consisting of Tanya Hilliard, Jocelyn Adams and Amanda Simpson. In 2015, Breen won her first WCT event as a skip, the Appleton Rum Cashspiel.

In 2017, Breen and her team were the last rink to qualify for the 2017 Canadian Olympic Curling Pre-Trials in Summerside, Prince Edward Island. There they upset Tracy Fleury in their opening match, followed by a win over 2006 Olympic bronze medallist Shannon Kleibrink. They would finish 3-3.

Since then, Breen has played in three Canadian Senior Curling Championships. She won bronze medals at the 2021 and 2022 Canadian Senior Curling Championships, and is competing in the 2024 Canadian Senior Curling Championships.

== Personal life ==
Breen is the daughter of Jean and Mike Breen.

Breen is a past chair of the Sandra Schmirler Foundation. She is a retired TD Wealth Financial Advisor. She is married to Barry Frame.
