= 1996 Canadian Mixed Curling Championship =

1996 Unitel Canadian Mixed Curling Championship
- Host city: Charlottetown, Prince Edward Island
- Arena: Charlottetown Curling Club
- Dates: January 6–14, 1996
- Winner: Saskatchewan
- Curling club: Caledonian Curling Club, Regina, Saskatchewan
- Skip: Randy Bryden
- Third: Cathy Trowell
- Second: Russ Bryden
- Lead: Karen Inglis
- Finalist: Ontario

The 1996 Unitel Canadian Mixed Curling Championship was held January 6-14 at the Charlottetown Curling Club in Charlottetown, Prince Edward Island.

Saskatchewan, skipped by Randy Bryden defeated Ontario, skipped by Rich Moffatt in the final. The game went into an extra end, where Moffatt was heavy with his final shot, giving Saskatchewan the win. The Saskatchewan rink also consisted of Cathy Trowell, Bryden's brother Russ and Trowell's sister, Karen Inglis. It was the province's first championship since 1984, and eighth in total.

== Teams ==
Teams were as follows:

Locale	Skip	Third	Second	Lead	City
Northwest Territories / Yukon	Trevor Alexander	Melody Nikiforow	Garry Tkachuk	Cheryl Burlington	Yellowknife
British Columbia	Craig Lepine	Karen Lepine	Jay Batch	Tasha Sweet	Vancouver
Alberta	Mike Sali	Shannon Kleibrink	Richard Kleibrink	Donna Grimsley	Calgary
Saskatchewan	Randy Bryden	Cathy Trowell	Russ Bryden	Karen Inglis	Regina
Manitoba	Chad McMullan	Jill Officer	Ross McFadyen	Heather Mowat	Winnipeg
Northern Ontario	Rick Stewart	Valerie MacInnes	Neil MacInnes	Marianne Kentish	Timmins
Ontario	Rich Moffatt	Theresa Breen	Peter Woodcox	Denise Allan	Ottawa
Quebec	Steeve Gagnon	Annie Gagnon	Rodrigue Tremblay	Christine Guay	Kénogami
Prince Edward Island	Blair Weeks	Janice MacCallum	Doug Weeks	Shelley Muzika	Charlottetown
Newfoundland	Gary Oke	Diane Ryan	Kenny Young	Jane Wellman	Corner Brook
New Brunswick	Grant Odishaw	Heather Smith	Rick Perron	Krista Bernard	Moncton
Nova Scotia	Scott Saunders	Colleen Jones	Kent Saunders	Diana Johnson	Halifax

== Standings ==
Final standings

Key
Teams to Playoffs

Province	Skip	Wins	Losses
Saskatchewan	Randy Bryden	9	2
Ontario	Rich Moffatt	8	3
Nova Scotia	Scott Saunders	8	3
British Columbia	Craig Lepine	7	4
Prince Edward Island	Blair Weeks	6	5
Alberta	Mike Sali	6	5
New Brunswick	Grant Odishaw	5	6
Manitoba	Chad McMullan	4	7
Newfoundland	Gary Oke	4	7
Northwest Territories/Yukon	Trevor Alexander	3	8
Northern Ontario	Rick Stewart	3	8
Quebec	Steeve Gagnon	3	8

== Playoffs ==
Page playoff system
1	Saskatchewan	4
2	Ontario	6
3	Nova Scotia	6
4	British Columbia	7

Semifinal
1	Saskatchewan	6
4	British Columbia	4

Final
2	Ontario	6
1	Saskatchewan	8

== Final ==
January 14, 6:30pm

Sheet	1	2	3	4	5	6	7	8	9	10	11	Final
Saskatchewan (Bryden) 🔨	0	2	0	0	1	0	0	2	1	0	2	8
Ontario (Moffatt)	1	0	1	0	0	1	1	0	0	2	0	6
