= Howard Rajala =

Canadian curler

- Curler
- Born: February 12, 1962 (age 64); Sault Ste. Marie, Ontario, Canada

Team
- Curling club: Rideau CC, Ottawa, ON
- Skip: Howard Rajala
- Third: Rich Moffatt
- Second: Chris Fulton
- Lead: Paul Madden
- Alternate: Phil Daniel

Curling career
- Member Association: Ontario
- Brier: 1 (1999)
Medal record
Curling
Representing Canada
World Senior Championships
Gold medal – first place	2023 Gangneung

Howard John "Howie" Rajala (born February 12, 1962) is a Canadian curler from Kanata, Ontario. He curls out of the Rideau Curling Club. In 2023 his rink won the World Senior Curling Championships for Canada.

Born in Sault Ste. Marie, Ontario, Rajala was a member of the Rich Moffatt rink that won the provincial championship in 1999. Rajala played third for that team that went 6–5 at the 1999 Labatt Brier.

In 1998, he was a member of the team that won The Dominion Regalia Silver Tankard for the Rideau Curling Club.

In 2001, Rajala won the Ontario Mixed title with teammates Darcie Simpson, Chris Fulton and Linda Fulton. This qualified his team to represent Ontario at the 2001 Canadian Mixed Curling Championship. The team finished the round robin with a 7–4 record in a massive 7-way tie for first place. After defeating British Columbia (skipped by Wes Craig) in their first tie breaker game, they lost in their second tie breaker game to Saskatchewan (skipped by Scott Coghlan).

With Moffatt, Rajala went to seven provincial championships. He began skipping 2002 and played in three more championships as skip (2003, 2008, 2011).

Rajala won the 2013 Ontario Senior Curling championships with Moffatt at third, Doug Johnston and Ken Sullivan. They represented Ontario at the 2013 Canadian Senior Curling Championships where they lost in the final to Wayne Tallon's New Brunswick rink.

Rajala won the 2017 Ontario Senior Curling championships, as well. They represented Ontario at the 2017 Canadian Senior Curling Championships where they lost in the final to Wade White's Alberta rink. He won again in 2020, but the Canadian Championships were cancelled due to the COVID-19 pandemic in Canada. Rajala won the 2022 Ontario Seniors again, and went on to win the 2022 Canadian Senior Curling Championships. His rink then won the 2023 World Senior Curling Championships for Canada.

== Personal life ==
Rajala went to Lakeway Collegiate & Vocational School in Sault Ste. Marie, where he was the skip of the high school curling team, and was the valedictorian of his graduating class. He graduated from the University of Waterloo with a degree in Mechanical Engineering in 1985, and then began working with Davis Engineering Ltd. in Ottawa.
