= 2023 World Senior Curling Championships =

- Host city: Gangneung, South Korea
- Arena: Gangneung Hockey Centre
- Dates: April 21–29
- Men's winner: Canada
- Skip: Howard Rajala
- Third: Rich Moffatt
- Second: Chris Fulton
- Lead: Paul Madden
- Alternate: Phil Daniel
- Coach: Bill Tschirhart
- Finalist: Scotland (Connal)
- Women's winner: Canada
- Skip: Sherry Anderson
- Third: Patty Hersikorn
- Second: Brenda Goertzen
- Lead: Anita Silvernagle
- Coach: Bill Tschirhart
- Finalist: Scotland (Lockhart)

The 2023 World Senior Curling Championships were held from April 21 to 29 at the Gangneung Hockey Centre in Gangneung, South Korea. The event was held in conjunction with the 2023 World Mixed Doubles Curling Championship.

== Men ==
=== Teams ===
The teams are listed as follows:

Australia	Belgium	Canada	Czech Republic
Skip: Hugh Millikin; Third: Steve Johns; Second: Geoff Davis; Lead: Tim McMahon; Alternate: Steve Hewitt	Skip: Stefan van Dijck; Third: Walter Verbueken; Second: Bart Palmans; Lead: Jan De Swert	Skip: Howard Rajala; Third: Rich Moffatt; Second: Chris Fulton; Lead: Paul Madden; Alternate: Phil Daniel	Skip: Radek Žďárský; Third: Miloš Plzák; Second: Vít Zinga; Lead: Jan Fencl; Alternate: Jiří Resl
Denmark	England	Estonia	Finland
Skip: Hans Peter Schack; Third: Jan Knoth; Second: Stig Munkholm; Lead: Thomas Westermann; Alternate: Bo Legaard	Skip: John Brown; Third: James Burman; Second: David Kershaw; Lead: Andrew Robbins	Skip: Margus Tubalkain; Third: Valvo Vooremaa; Second: Tiit Kaart; Lead: Tonis Turmann; Alternate: Hannes Reinola	Skip: Jussi Uusipaavalniemi; Third: Markku Hamalainen; Second: Jukka Savonen; Lead: Markku Henttonen; Alternate: Juha Kalmari
Germany	Hong Kong	Hungary	Ireland
Skip: Christoph Möckel; Third: Bernhard Mayr; Second: Matthias Steiner; Lead: Matthias Zobel; Alternate: Thomas Meurer	Skip: Wong Chun Ngok; Third: Shek Chong John Li; Second: Lai Chor Alan Luk; Lead: Chung Hon Keung; Alternate: Fok Wai Hung	Skip: György Nagy; Third: Zoltàn Jakab; Second: Gabor Bartalus; Lead: Krisztian Barna	Skip: Bill Gray; Third: David Whyte; Second: Neil Fyfe; Lead: Ross Barr; Alternate: Johnjo Kenny
Japan	Latvia	New Zealand	Norway
Skip: Tamotsu Matsumura; Third: Seiji Yamamoto; Second: Takahito Tomiyasu; Lead: Akira Otsuka	Skip: Ansis Regža; Third: Janis Redlihs; Second: Aivars Purmalis; Lead: Aivars Lacis	Skip: Dan Mustapic; Third: Hans Frauenlob; Second: Dave Watt; Lead: Iain Craig; Alternate: Lorne De Pape	Fourth: Kjell Berg; Third: Stig-Arne Gunnestad; Skip: Tormod Andreassen; Lead: Kverne Halvard
Poland	Scotland	Slovenia	South Korea
Skip: Damian Herman; Third: Paweł Kłos; Second: Krzysztof Nowak; Lead: Paweł Piotrowicz; Alternate: Janusz Tomica	Skip: Graeme Connal; Third: Alistair Scott; Second: Mark Fraser; Lead: Mark Brass	Skip: Gregor Rigler; Third: Silvo Praprotnik; Second: Marijan Kremzar; Lead: Marjan Petric; Alternate: Darko Gregori	Skip: Cheon In-seon; Third: Her Jung-wook; Second: Ham Young-woo; Lead: Shin Man-ho; Alternate: Choi Jong-kyung
Sweden	Switzerland	United States	Wales
Skip: Mats Wranå; Third: Mikael Hasselborg; Second: Anders Eriksson; Lead: Gerry Wåhlin; Alternate: Per Noréen	Skip: Christof Schwaller; Third: Robert Hürlimann; Second: Christoph Kaiser; Lead: Rolf Iseli; Alternate: Pierre Hug	Skip: Joel Larway; Third: Doug Kauffman; Second: Darren Lehto; Lead: John Rasmussen; Alternate: Sean Silver	Skip: Adrian Meikle; Third: Andrew Tanner; Second: Richard Pougher; Lead: Gary Waddell

=== Round robin standings ===
Final round robin standings

Key
Teams to Playoffs

Group A	Skip	W	L	W–L	DSC
Hungary	György Nagy	7	0	–	65.23
Canada	Howard Rajala	6	1	–	39.88
Czech Republic	Radek Žďárský	4	3	1–0	82.37
Belgium	Stefan van Dijck	4	3	0–1	96.12
Finland	Jussi Uusipaavalniemi	3	4	1–0	66.48
Japan	Tamotsu Matsumura	3	4	0–1	55.20
Poland	Damian Herman	1	6	–	59.04
Denmark	Hans Peter Schack	0	7	–	77.36

Group B	Skip	W	L	W–L	DSC
Sweden	Mats Wranå	7	0	–	54.66
Switzerland	Christof Schwaller	6	1	–	66.10
Latvia	Ansis Regža	4	3	1–0	82.62
Germany	Christoph Möckel	4	3	0–1	64.52
New Zealand	Dan Mustapic	3	4	–	45.60
South Korea	Cheon In-seon	2	5	–	79.21
England	John Brown	1	6	1–0	82.27
Hong Kong	Wong Chun Ngok	1	6	0–1	116.36

Group C	Skip	W	L	W–L	DSC
United States	Joel Larway	7	0	–	42.72
Ireland	Bill Gray	6	1	–	55.37
Scotland	Graeme Connal	4	3	1–1	39.71
Norway	Tormod Andreassen	4	3	1–1	52.50
Australia	Hugh Millikin	4	3	1–1	61.78
Wales	Adrian Meikle	2	5	–	71.88
Slovenia	Gregor Rigler	1	6	–	133.87
Estonia	Margus Tubalkain	0	7	–	105.12

Group A Round Robin Summary Table
Pos.	Country	Belgium	Canada	Czech Republic	Denmark	Finland	Hungary	Japan	Poland	Record
4	Belgium	—	1–6	3–8	8–3	5–4	6–7	8–1	10–4	4–3
2	Canada	6–1	—	7–4	12–0	7–3	6–8	10–3	11–2	6–1
3	Czech Republic	8–3	4–7	—	8–7	8–6	4–6	4–10	9–4	4–3
8	Denmark	3–8	0–12	7–8	—	4–10	3–10	4–7	1–7	0–7
5	Finland	4–5	3–7	6–8	10–4	—	8–9	7–6	8–5	3–4
1	Hungary	7–6	8–6	6–4	10–3	9–8	—	7–1	6–5	7–0
6	Japan	1–8	3–10	10–4	7–4	6–7	1–7	—	6–3	3–4
7	Poland	4–10	2–11	4–9	7–1	5–8	5–6	3–6	—	1–6

Group B Round Robin Summary Table
Pos.	Country	England	Germany	Hong Kong	Latvia	New Zealand	South Korea	Sweden	Switzerland	Record
7	England	—	5–8	13–3	4–8	5–6	4–8	1–10	4–8	1–6
4	Germany	8–5	—	8–2	2–6	8–3	5–4	6–8	4–10	4–3
8	Hong Kong	3–13	2–8	—	3–5	2–7	9–5	2–14	2–11	1–6
3	Latvia	8–4	6–2	5–3	—	9–6	8–10	4–5	5–9	4–3
5	New Zealand	6–5	3–8	7–2	6–9	—	9–5	4–9	6–9	3–4
6	South Korea	8–4	4–5	5–9	10–8	5–9	—	3–9	1–12	2–5
1	Sweden	10–1	8–6	14–2	5–4	9–4	9–3	—	5–2	7–0
2	Switzerland	8–4	10–4	11–2	9–5	9–6	12–1	2–5	—	6–1

Group C Round Robin Summary Table
Pos.	Country	Australia	Estonia		Norway	Scotland	Slovenia	United States	Wales	Record
5	Australia	—	8–2	7–8	10–7	2–8	10–3	6–10	8–3	4–3
8	Estonia	2–8	—	4–11	3–9	2–8	5–6	3–9	4–6	0–7
2	Ireland	8–7	11–4	—	7–4	9–7	6–4	2–7	6–4	6–1
4	Norway	7–10	9–3	4–7	—	8–6	7–3	6–8	5–4	4–3
3	Scotland	8–2	8–2	7–9	6–8	—	8–3	5–6	7–2	4–3
7	Slovenia	3–10	6–5	4–6	3–7	3–8	—	1–12	2–14	1–6
1	United States	10–6	9–3	7–2	8–6	6–5	12–1	—	8–3	7–0
6	Wales	3–8	6–4	4–6	4–5	2–7	14–2	3–8	—	2–5

=== Round robin results ===
All draw times are listed in Korean Standard Time (UTC+09:00).

==== Draw 1 ====
Friday, April 21, 8:00 pm

Sheet B	1	2	3	4	5	6	7	8	Final
Canada (Rajala) 🔨	0	2	3	2	2	3	X	X	12
Denmark (Schack)	0	0	0	0	0	0	X	X	0

Sheet C	1	2	3	4	5	6	7	8	Final
Belgium (van Dijck)	0	0	1	0	2	0	0	X	3
Czech Republic (Žďárský) 🔨	1	1	0	3	0	2	1	X	8

Sheet E	1	2	3	4	5	6	7	8	Final
Ireland (Gray) 🔨	2	0	1	0	0	5	0	0	8
Australia (Millikin)	0	1	0	2	1	0	1	2	7

Sheet F	1	2	3	4	5	6	7	8	Final
Hungary (Nagy)	0	1	0	3	0	1	0	1	6
Poland (Herman) 🔨	1	0	1	0	1	0	2	0	5

==== Draw 2 ====
Saturday, April 22, 8:00 am

Sheet A	1	2	3	4	5	6	7	8	Final
Slovenia (Rigler)	0	0	2	0	0	0	X	X	2
Wales (Meikle) 🔨	5	2	0	1	1	5	X	X	14

Sheet C	1	2	3	4	5	6	7	8	Final
Latvia (Regža)	1	1	0	0	1	2	1	X	6
Germany (Möckel) 🔨	0	0	1	1	0	0	0	X	2

==== Draw 3 ====
Saturday, April 22, 12:00 pm

Sheet B	1	2	3	4	5	6	7	8	Final
Finland (Uusipaavalniemi) 🔨	1	0	2	0	3	0	0	0	6
Czech Republic (Žďárský)	0	2	0	2	0	2	1	1	8

Sheet C	1	2	3	4	5	6	7	8	Final
New Zealand (Mustapic) 🔨	3	0	0	0	0	1	0	X	4
Sweden (Wranå)	0	4	1	1	1	0	2	X	9

Sheet E	1	2	3	4	5	6	7	8	Final
Belgium (van Dijck)	0	0	0	0	1	0	0	X	1
Canada (Rajala) 🔨	2	0	0	0	0	2	2	X	6

Sheet F	1	2	3	4	5	6	7	8	Final
Estonia (Tubalkain) 🔨	0	1	0	0	3	0	0	X	4
Ireland (Gray)	1	0	1	2	0	3	4	X	11

==== Draw 4 ====
Saturday, April 22, 4:00 pm

Sheet B	1	2	3	4	5	6	7	8	9	Final
Norway (Andreassen)	0	1	0	2	1	2	0	1	0	7
Australia (Millikin) 🔨	3	0	2	0	0	0	2	0	3	10

Sheet D	1	2	3	4	5	6	7	8	Final
Switzerland (Schwaller) 🔨	3	1	2	0	0	5	X	X	11
Hong Kong (Wong)	0	0	0	2	0	0	X	X	2

Sheet F	1	2	3	4	5	6	7	8	Final
Japan (Matsumura)	2	1	0	2	0	2	0	0	7
Denmark (Schack) 🔨	0	0	1	0	1	0	1	1	4

==== Draw 5 ====
Saturday, April 22, 8:00 pm

Sheet C	1	2	3	4	5	6	7	8	Final
Czech Republic (Žďárský)	1	1	0	2	0	0	0	X	4
Hungary (Nagy) 🔨	0	0	1	0	1	2	2	X	6

Sheet D	1	2	3	4	5	6	7	8	Final
Scotland (Connal)	0	1	0	1	1	0	2	0	5
United States (Larway) 🔨	2	0	1	0	0	2	0	1	6

Sheet E	1	2	3	4	5	6	7	8	Final
South Korea (Cheon)	0	1	0	2	1	1	1	2	8
England (Brown) 🔨	3	0	1	0	0	0	0	0	4

==== Draw 6 ====
Sunday, April 23, 8:00 am

Sheet A	1	2	3	4	5	6	7	8	Final
Finland (Uusipaavalniemi)	0	1	0	0	1	0	1	1	4
Belgium (van Dijck) 🔨	1	0	2	1	0	1	0	0	5

Sheet B	1	2	3	4	5	6	7	8	Final
New Zealand (Mustapic) 🔨	2	0	2	1	1	1	0	X	7
Hong Kong (Wong)	0	1	0	0	0	0	1	X	2

Sheet D	1	2	3	4	5	6	7	8	Final
Poland (Herman)	0	1	0	1	1	0	0	X	3
Japan (Matsumura) 🔨	2	0	1	0	0	1	2	X	6

Sheet E	1	2	3	4	5	6	7	8	Final
Sweden (Wranå) 🔨	2	0	1	0	1	1	0	X	5
Switzerland (Schwaller)	0	1	0	0	0	0	1	X	2

Sheet F	1	2	3	4	5	6	7	8	Final
Slovenia (Rigler)	0	0	1	1	1	0	0	X	3
Australia (Millikin) 🔨	0	4	0	0	0	2	4	X	10

==== Draw 7 ====
Sunday, April 23, 12:00 pm

Sheet E	1	2	3	4	5	6	7	8	Final
United States (Larway)	0	0	3	0	0	1	1	2	7
Ireland (Gray) 🔨	1	0	0	0	1	0	0	0	2

Sheet F	1	2	3	4	5	6	7	8	Final
Canada (Rajala) 🔨	2	0	2	0	1	0	1	0	6
Hungary (Nagy)	0	3	0	1	0	2	0	2	8

==== Draw 8 ====
Sunday, April 23, 4:00 pm

Sheet A	1	2	3	4	5	6	7	8	Final
Estonia (Tubalkain)	0	0	1	0	0	0	1	0	2
Scotland (Connal) 🔨	2	1	0	0	2	1	0	2	8

Sheet B	1	2	3	4	5	6	7	8	9	Final
South Korea (Cheon)	2	4	0	0	0	0	1	1	2	10
Latvia (Regža) 🔨	0	0	1	1	3	3	0	0	0	8

Sheet C	1	2	3	4	5	6	7	8	9	Final
Norway (Andreassen)	0	0	2	1	0	0	1	0	1	5
Wales (Meikle) 🔨	0	2	0	0	0	1	0	1	0	4

Sheet D	1	2	3	4	5	6	7	8	Final
England (Brown)	0	0	2	0	1	1	1	X	5
Germany (Möckel) 🔨	3	1	0	4	0	0	0	X	8

Sheet F	1	2	3	4	5	6	7	8	Final
Poland (Herman) 🔨	3	0	1	0	0	1	0	0	5
Finland (Uusipaavalniemi)	0	3	0	1	1	0	2	1	8

==== Draw 9 ====
Sunday, April 23, 8:00 pm

Sheet D	1	2	3	4	5	6	7	8	Final
Denmark (Schack)	0	2	0	0	1	0	0	X	3
Belgium (van Dijck) 🔨	1	0	1	1	0	1	4	X	8

==== Draw 10 ====
Monday, April 24, 8:00 am

Sheet A	1	2	3	4	5	6	7	8	Final
Latvia (Regža)	1	0	0	0	0	3	4	X	8
England (Brown) 🔨	0	0	0	2	2	0	0	X	4

Sheet B	1	2	3	4	5	6	7	8	Final
United States (Larway) 🔨	2	0	4	1	2	0	X	X	9
Estonia (Tubalkain)	0	2	0	0	0	1	X	X	3

Sheet C	1	2	3	4	5	6	7	8	9	Final
Ireland (Gray) 🔨	0	1	0	2	2	0	1	1	2	9
Scotland (Connal)	2	0	2	0	0	3	0	0	0	7

Sheet D	1	2	3	4	5	6	7	8	Final
Norway (Andreassen) 🔨	0	0	3	2	1	1	0	X	7
Slovenia (Rigler)	0	2	0	0	0	0	1	X	3

Sheet E	1	2	3	4	5	6	7	8	Final
Australia (Millikin) 🔨	1	2	0	2	2	0	1	X	8
Wales (Meikle)	0	0	1	0	0	2	0	X	3

Sheet F	1	2	3	4	5	6	7	8	Final
Germany (Möckel)	0	0	3	0	1	0	1	0	5
South Korea (Cheon) 🔨	0	3	0	0	0	0	0	1	4

==== Draw 11 ====
Monday, April 24, 12:00 pm

Sheet A	1	2	3	4	5	6	7	8	Final
Switzerland (Schwaller)	0	2	0	2	0	2	3	X	9
New Zealand (Mustapic) 🔨	2	0	1	0	3	0	0	X	6

Sheet B	1	2	3	4	5	6	7	8	Final
Denmark (Schack)	0	0	1	0	0	0	X	X	1
Poland (Herman) 🔨	2	1	0	1	2	1	X	X	7

Sheet C	1	2	3	4	5	6	7	8	Final
Japan (Matsumura) 🔨	0	1	0	0	0	0	X	X	1
Belgium (van Dijck)	1	0	2	1	3	1	X	X	8

Sheet D	1	2	3	4	5	6	7	8	Final
Canada (Rajala) 🔨	2	0	1	2	0	2	0	X	7
Czech Republic (Žďárský)	0	1	0	0	2	0	1	X	4

Sheet E	1	2	3	4	5	6	7	8	9	Final
Hungary (Nagy) 🔨	0	3	0	0	3	0	0	2	1	9
Finland (Uusipaavalniemi)	0	0	4	2	0	2	0	0	0	8

Sheet F	1	2	3	4	5	6	7	8	Final
Hong Kong (Wong)	0	1	0	0	1	0	X	X	2
Sweden (Wranå) 🔨	3	0	6	2	0	3	X	X	14

==== Draw 13 ====
Monday, April 24, 8:00 pm

Sheet A	1	2	3	4	5	6	7	8	Final
United States (Larway) 🔨	5	3	0	1	0	3	X	X	12
Slovenia (Rigler)	0	0	0	0	1	0	X	X	1

Sheet C	1	2	3	4	5	6	7	8	Final
England (Brown) 🔨	5	1	4	0	1	0	2	X	13
Hong Kong (Wong)	0	0	0	2	0	1	0	X	3

Sheet F	1	2	3	4	5	6	7	8	Final
Scotland (Connal)	3	0	1	1	1	0	1	X	7
Wales (Meikle) 🔨	0	1	0	0	0	1	0	X	2

==== Draw 14 ====
Tuesday, April 25, 8:00 am

Sheet E	1	2	3	4	5	6	7	8	9	Final
Denmark (Schack) 🔨	1	1	0	0	2	0	1	2	0	7
Czech Republic (Žďárský)	0	0	4	2	0	1	0	0	1	8

==== Draw 15 ====
Tuesday, April 25, 12:00 pm

Sheet A	1	2	3	4	5	6	7	8	Final
Sweden (Wranå) 🔨	2	0	3	0	0	2	2	X	9
South Korea (Cheon)	0	1	0	0	2	0	0	X	3

Sheet B	1	2	3	4	5	6	7	8	Final
Japan (Matsumura)	0	0	2	0	0	0	4	0	6
Finland (Uusipaavalniemi) 🔨	1	1	0	2	1	0	0	2	7

Sheet C	1	2	3	4	5	6	7	8	Final
United States (Larway)	0	4	0	1	1	0	2	2	10
Australia (Millikin) 🔨	2	0	2	0	0	2	0	0	6

Sheet D	1	2	3	4	5	6	7	8	Final
Wales (Meikle) 🔨	2	1	2	1	0	0	0	X	6
Estonia (Tubalkain)	0	0	0	0	1	2	1	X	4

Sheet E	1	2	3	4	5	6	7	8	Final
Scotland (Connal) 🔨	3	0	3	0	0	0	0	0	6
Norway (Andreassen)	0	2	0	2	1	1	1	1	8

Sheet F	1	2	3	4	5	6	7	8	Final
Switzerland (Schwaller)	0	0	2	1	4	0	2	X	9
Latvia (Regža) 🔨	1	2	0	0	0	2	0	X	5

==== Draw 16 ====
Tuesday, April 25, 4:00 pm

Sheet A	1	2	3	4	5	6	7	8	Final
Germany (Möckel) 🔨	2	0	3	0	1	1	1	X	8
Hong Kong (Wong)	0	2	0	0	0	0	0	X	2

Sheet B	1	2	3	4	5	6	7	8	Final
Ireland (Gray) 🔨	1	3	0	1	0	0	1	0	6
Slovenia (Rigler)	0	0	1	0	1	1	0	1	4

Sheet C	1	2	3	4	5	6	7	8	Final
Poland (Herman)	0	1	0	0	1	0	0	X	2
Canada (Rajala) 🔨	2	0	2	0	0	2	5	X	11

Sheet D	1	2	3	4	5	6	7	8	9	Final
Belgium (van Dijck)	1	1	0	1	0	2	1	0	0	6
Hungary (Nagy) 🔨	0	0	1	0	2	0	0	3	1	7

Sheet F	1	2	3	4	5	6	7	8	Final
New Zealand (Mustapic)	0	1	0	0	1	2	0	2	6
England (Brown) 🔨	0	0	1	3	0	0	1	0	5

==== Draw 17 ====
Tuesday, April 25, 8:00 pm

Sheet D	1	2	3	4	5	6	7	8	Final
Sweden (Wranå)	0	2	0	0	2	0	0	1	5
Latvia (Regža) 🔨	1	0	1	0	0	2	0	0	4

==== Draw 18 ====
Wednesday, April 26, 8:00 am

Sheet A	1	2	3	4	5	6	7	8	Final
Hungary (Nagy) 🔨	2	3	0	1	0	4	X	X	10
Denmark (Schack)	0	0	2	0	1	0	X	X	3

Sheet B	1	2	3	4	5	6	7	8	Final
Poland (Herman) 🔨	0	0	1	2	1	0	0	X	4
Belgium (van Dijck)	3	3	0	0	0	2	2	X	10

Sheet C	1	2	3	4	5	6	7	8	Final
South Korea (Cheon) 🔨	0	2	0	1	0	2	0	X	5
New Zealand (Mustapic)	1	0	4	0	3	0	1	X	9

Sheet D	1	2	3	4	5	6	7	8	Final
Australia (Millikin)	1	0	0	0	1	0	0	X	2
Scotland (Connal) 🔨	0	2	1	0	0	2	3	X	8

Sheet F	1	2	3	4	5	6	7	8	Final
Norway (Andreassen)	0	1	1	0	2	0	2	0	6
United States (Larway) 🔨	4	0	0	2	0	1	0	1	8

==== Draw 19 ====
Wednesday, April 26, 12:00 pm

Sheet B	1	2	3	4	5	6	7	8	Final
England (Brown)	0	1	0	0	0	0	X	X	1
Sweden (Wranå) 🔨	3	0	1	3	1	2	X	X	10

Sheet C	1	2	3	4	5	6	7	8	Final
Germany (Möckel)	0	2	0	0	2	0	X	X	4
Switzerland (Schwaller) 🔨	3	0	0	4	0	3	X	X	10

Sheet E	1	2	3	4	5	6	7	8	Final
Hong Kong (Wong)	0	0	1	1	0	0	1	0	3
Latvia (Regža) 🔨	1	1	0	0	1	1	0	1	5

Sheet F	1	2	3	4	5	6	7	8	Final
Czech Republic (Žďárský)	0	3	0	0	0	1	0	X	4
Japan (Matsumura) 🔨	2	0	1	3	2	0	2	X	10

==== Draw 20 ====
Wednesday, April 26, 4:00 pm

Sheet A	1	2	3	4	5	6	7	8	Final
Wales (Meikle) 🔨	0	0	1	0	2	0	0	1	4
Ireland (Gray)	0	2	0	2	0	1	1	0	6

Sheet E	1	2	3	4	5	6	7	8	9	Final
Slovenia (Rigler)	0	1	1	0	1	2	0	0	1	6
Estonia (Tubalkain) 🔨	1	0	0	2	0	0	1	1	0	5

==== Draw 21 ====
Wednesday, April 26, 8:00 pm

Sheet E	1	2	3	4	5	6	7	8	Final
Germany (Möckel) 🔨	2	0	3	0	0	0	3	X	8
New Zealand (Mustapic)	0	1	0	1	1	0	0	X	3

Sheet F	1	2	3	4	5	6	7	8	Final
Finland (Uusipaavalniemi)	1	0	1	0	0	1	0	0	3
Canada (Rajala) 🔨	0	2	0	1	1	0	1	2	7

==== Draw 22 ====
Thursday, April 27, 8:00 am

Sheet A	1	2	3	4	5	6	7	8	Final
England (Brown) 🔨	1	0	2	0	0	1	0	X	4
Switzerland (Schwaller)	0	4	0	2	1	0	1	X	8

Sheet B	1	2	3	4	5	6	7	8	Final
Hong Kong (Wong) 🔨	2	1	0	2	0	3	0	1	9
South Korea (Cheon)	0	0	2	0	2	0	1	0	5

Sheet C	1	2	3	4	5	6	7	8	Final
Scotland (Connal) 🔨	3	0	3	0	2	0	X	X	8
Slovenia (Rigler)	0	1	0	1	0	1	X	X	3

Sheet D	1	2	3	4	5	6	7	8	Final
Ireland (Gray) 🔨	1	1	1	1	1	0	0	2	7
Norway (Andreassen)	0	0	0	0	0	2	2	0	4

Sheet E	1	2	3	4	5	6	7	8	Final
Japan (Matsumura)	0	0	0	1	0	0	0	X	1
Hungary (Nagy) 🔨	3	0	0	0	1	2	1	X	7

Sheet F	1	2	3	4	5	6	7	8	Final
Australia (Millikin) 🔨	0	3	2	1	2	0	X	X	8
Estonia (Tubalkain)	1	0	0	0	0	1	X	X	2

==== Draw 23 ====
Thursday, April 27, 12:00 pm

Sheet D	1	2	3	4	5	6	7	8	Final
Czech Republic (Žďárský)	0	0	4	1	1	0	3	X	9
Poland (Herman)	1	2	0	0	0	1	0	X	4

Sheet E	1	2	3	4	5	6	7	8	Final
Wales (Meikle)	0	0	0	1	0	2	X	X	3
United States (Larway)	1	2	4	0	1	0	X	X	8

==== Draw 24 ====
Thursday, April 27, 4:00 pm

Sheet B	1	2	3	4	5	6	7	8	Final
Latvia (Regža)	1	0	1	0	4	0	2	1	9
New Zealand (Mustapic) 🔨	0	1	0	1	0	4	0	0	6

Sheet C	1	2	3	4	5	6	7	8	Final
Finland (Uusipaavalniemi) 🔨	3	4	0	3	0	0	X	X	10
Denmark (Schack)	0	0	2	0	1	1	X	X	4

Sheet F	1	2	3	4	5	6	7	8	Final
Sweden (Wranå)	1	2	0	3	0	0	0	2	8
Germany (Möckel) 🔨	0	0	1	0	3	1	1	0	6

==== Draw 25 ====
Thursday, April 27, 8:00 pm

Sheet A	1	2	3	4	5	6	7	8	Final
Canada (Rajala)	0	2	0	3	2	0	3	X	10
Japan (Matsumura) 🔨	1	0	1	0	0	1	0	X	3

Sheet B	1	2	3	4	5	6	7	8	Final
Estonia (Tubalkain)	0	0	0	2	0	1	X	X	3
Norway (Andreassen) 🔨	1	4	1	0	3	0	X	X	9

Sheet D	1	2	3	4	5	6	7	8	Final
South Korea (Cheon) 🔨	0	1	0	0	0	0	X	X	1
Switzerland (Schwaller)	3	0	3	3	3	0	X	X	12

=== Playoffs ===
Quarterfinals
1	United States	11
8	Czech Republic	2
4	Canada	9
5	Ireland	1
2	Sweden	4
7	Scotland	5
3	Hungary	2
6	Switzerland	6

Semifinals
1	United States	2
4	Canada	8
7	Scotland	6
6	Switzerland	2

Gold medal game
4	Canada	7
7	Scotland	2
Third place
1	United States	4
6	Switzerland	7

==== Quarterfinals ====
Friday, April 28, 1:00 pm

Sheet B	1	2	3	4	5	6	7	8	Final
Canada (Rajala) 🔨	1	1	2	0	4	1	X	X	9
Ireland (Gray)	0	0	0	1	0	0	X	X	1

Sheet C	1	2	3	4	5	6	7	8	Final
United States (Larway) 🔨	2	1	3	0	2	0	3	X	11
Czech Republic (Žďárský)	0	0	0	1	0	1	0	X	2

Sheet D	1	2	3	4	5	6	7	8	Final
Sweden (Wranå) 🔨	2	0	0	1	0	1	0	0	4
Scotland (Connal)	0	0	2	0	1	0	0	2	5

Sheet E	1	2	3	4	5	6	7	8	Final
Hungary (Nagy) 🔨	1	0	0	0	0	1	0	X	2
Switzerland (Schwaller)	0	0	2	1	1	0	2	X	6

==== Semifinals ====
Friday, April 28, 7:00 pm

Sheet B	1	2	3	4	5	6	7	8	Final
Scotland (Connal) 🔨	2	1	0	1	0	2	0	X	6
Switzerland (Schwaller)	0	0	0	0	2	0	0	X	2

Sheet E	1	2	3	4	5	6	7	8	Final
United States (Larway)	0	0	0	1	0	1	X	X	2
Canada (Rajala) 🔨	1	2	3	0	2	0	X	X	8

==== Bronze medal game ====
Saturday, April 29, 10:30 am

Sheet D	1	2	3	4	5	6	7	8	Final
United States (Larway) 🔨	0	0	1	0	1	0	2	X	4
Switzerland (Schwaller)	1	1	0	1	0	4	0	X	7

==== Gold medal game ====
Saturday, April 29, 10:30 am

Sheet C	1	2	3	4	5	6	7	8	Final
Canada (Rajala) 🔨	2	1	0	2	0	2	X	X	7
Scotland (Connal)	0	0	1	0	1	0	X	X	2

=== Final standings ===
Place	Team
1st place, gold medalist(s)	Canada
2nd place, silver medalist(s)	Scotland
3rd place, bronze medalist(s)	Switzerland
4	United States
5	Czech Republic
5	Hungary
5	Ireland
5	Sweden
9	Latvia
10	Norway
11	Germany
12	Belgium
13	New Zealand
14	Australia
15	Finland
16	Japan
17	Wales
18	South Korea
19	Poland
20	England
21	Slovenia
22	Denmark
23	Estonia
24	Hong Kong

== Women ==
=== Teams ===
The teams are listed as follows:

Australia	Canada	Czech Republic	England	Finland
Skip: Kim Forge; Third: Lyn Gill; Second: Kim Irvine; Lead: Adrienne Kennedy	Skip: Sherry Anderson; Third: Patty Hersikorn; Second: Brenda Goertzen; Lead: Anita Silvernagle	Skip: Lenka Šafránková; Third: Jana Voborníková; Second: Romana Havelková; Lead: Jana Zikmundová; Alternate: Věra Netušilová	Skip: Manon Harsch; Third: Angela Wilcox; Second: Helen Forbes; Lead: Deborah Higgins; Alternate: Jane Robbins	Skip: Tiina Julkunen; Third: Kirsi Paarma; Second: Laura Tsutsunen; Lead: Nina Pollanen; Alternate: Sari Laakonen
Hong Kong	Ireland	Japan	Latvia	Lithuania
Skip: Ling-Yue Hung; Third: Grace Bugg; Second: Arena McCullough; Lead: Kwan Siu Ling; Alternate: To Shu Anna Cheng	Skip: Dale Sinclair; Third: Bernie Gillett; Second: Nina Clancy; Lead: Louise Kerr	Skip: Miyuki Kawamura; Third: Misako Kawahira; Second: Yukari Hayashi; Lead: Yukie Kitaguchi; Alternate: Yoko Kobayashi	Skip: Elēna Kāpostiņa; Third: Dace Zīle; Second: Iluta Linde; Lead: Gunta Millere; Alternate: Aija Rudzīte	Fourth: Gaiva Valatkienė; Skip: Rasa Veronika Jasaitienė; Second: Jolanta Šulinskienė; Lead: Eglė Čepulytė
New Zealand	Scotland	Sweden	Switzerland	United States
Skip: Joanna Olszewski; Third: Sandra Thomas; Second: Pauline Farra; Lead: Elizabeth Matthews; Alternate: Merran Anderson	Skip: Jackie Lockhart; Third: Mairi Milne; Second: Wendy Johnston; Lead: Katie Loudon; Alternate: Edith Hazard	Skip: Camilla Noréen; Third: Mari Wickström; Second: Helene Lyxell; Lead: Catrin Bitén	Skip: Monika Gafner; Third: Daniela Gygax; Second: Susanne Hochuli; Lead: Irene Beck	Skip: Margie Smith; Third: Ann Swisshelm; Second: Shelly Kosal; Lead: Shelley Dropkin

=== Round robin standings ===
Final round robin standings

Key
Teams to Playoffs

Group A	Skip	W	L	W–L	DSC
Canada	Sherry Anderson	7	0	–	37.68
Japan	Miyuki Kawamura	6	1	–	52.39
Sweden	Camilla Noréen	5	2	–	92.21
United States	Margie Smith	4	3	–	69.53
England	Manon Harsch	2	5	1–0	98.82
Hong Kong	Ling-Yue Hung	2	5	0–1	76.65
New Zealand	Joanna Olszewski	1	6	1–0	129.38
Lithuania	Rasa Veronika Jasaitienė	1	6	0–1	146.77

Group B	Skip	W	L	W–L	DSC
Scotland	Jackie Lockhart	6	0	–	84.46
Switzerland	Monika Gafner	5	1	–	52.14
Ireland	Dale Sinclair	4	2	–	59.93
Finland	Tiina Julkunen	2	4	1–0	103.18
Latvia	Elēna Kāpostiņa	2	4	0–1	102.79
Czech Republic	Lenka Šafránková	1	5	1–0	73.50
Australia	Kim Forge	1	5	0–1	86.41

Group A Round Robin Summary Table
Pos.	Country	Canada	England	Hong Kong	Japan	Lithuania	New Zealand	Sweden	United States	Record
1	Canada	—	9–2	8–3	12–2	9–1	8–4	7–4	7–6	7–0
5	England	2–9	—	6–5	5–7	9–12	15–0	9–10	1–9	2–5
6	Hong Kong	3–8	5–6	—	3–6	8–6	17–4	4–7	3–6	2–5
2	Japan	2–12	7–5	6–3	—	8–6	15–1	8–1	9–8	6–1
8	Lithuania	1–9	12–9	6–8	6–8	—	4–7	6–7	1–9	1–6
7	New Zealand	4–8	0–15	4–17	1–15	7–4	—	2–8	5–14	1–6
3	Sweden	4–7	10–9	7–4	1–8	7–6	8–2	—	7–6	5–2
4	United States	6–7	9–1	6–3	8–9	9–1	14–5	6–7	—	4–3

Group B Round Robin Summary Table
Pos.	Country	Australia	Czech Republic	Finland		Latvia	Scotland	Switzerland	Record
7	Australia	—	3–8	7–6	4–5	3–8	2–7	7–11	1–5
6	Czech Republic	8–3	—	3–9	L–W	7–10	4–12	3–9	1–5
4	Finland	6–7	9–3	—	7–9	10–7	1–18	2–8	2–4
3	Ireland	5–4	W–L	9–7	—	6–2	4–10	6–8	4–2
5	Latvia	8–3	10–7	7–10	2–6	—	4–7	5–8	2–4
1	Scotland	7–2	12–4	18–1	10–4	7–4	—	10–4	6–0
2	Switzerland	11–7	9–3	8–2	8–6	8–5	4–10	—	5–1

=== Round robin results ===
All draw times are listed in Korean Standard Time (UTC+09:00).

==== Draw 2 ====
Saturday, April 22, 8:00 am

Sheet D	1	2	3	4	5	6	7	8	Final
United States (Smith) 🔨	5	4	0	0	0	5	X	X	14
New Zealand (Olszewski)	0	0	1	1	3	0	X	X	5

Sheet F	1	2	3	4	5	6	7	8	9	Final
Australia (Forge) 🔨	0	0	2	0	3	0	0	1	1	7
Finland (Julkunen)	1	1	0	1	0	2	1	0	0	6

==== Draw 3 ====
Saturday, April 22, 12:00 pm

Sheet A	1	2	3	4	5	6	7	8	Final
Sweden (Noréen) 🔨	1	0	4	1	0	1	0	X	7
Hong Kong (Hung)	0	1	0	0	1	0	2	X	4

Sheet D	1	2	3	4	5	6	7	8	Final
Czech Republic (Šafránková)	1	0	0	0	0	2	2	/	L^
Ireland (Sinclair) 🔨	0	2	2	2	0	0	0		W

^Czech Republic ran out of time, and therefore forfeited the match.

==== Draw 4 ====
Saturday, April 22, 4:00 pm

Sheet C	1	2	3	4	5	6	7	8	Final
Japan (Kawamura)	0	1	0	0	1	0	0	X	2
Canada (Anderson) 🔨	4	0	3	1	0	2	2	X	12

Sheet E	1	2	3	4	5	6	7	8	Final
Switzerland (Gafner) 🔨	0	0	1	0	2	1	0	X	4
Scotland (Lockhart)	2	3	0	3	0	0	2	X	10

==== Draw 5 ====
Saturday, April 22, 8:00 pm

Sheet A	1	2	3	4	5	6	7	8	Final
Australia (Forge)	1	0	0	1	1	0	0	0	3
Latvia (Kāpostiņa) 🔨	0	2	1	0	0	1	3	1	8

Sheet B	1	2	3	4	5	6	7	8	Final
Lithuania (Jasaitienė)	0	0	0	1	0	0	X	X	1
United States (Smith) 🔨	3	2	2	0	1	1	X	X	9

Sheet F	1	2	3	4	5	6	7	8	Final
Sweden (Noréen) 🔨	1	0	0	0	0	4	0	5	10
England (Harsch)	0	1	1	3	2	0	2	0	9

==== Draw 7 ====
Sunday, April 23, 12:00 pm

Sheet A	1	2	3	4	5	6	7	8	Final
Lithuania (Jasaitienė)	0	2	1	0	0	0	1	0	4
New Zealand (Olszewski) 🔨	1	0	0	1	2	2	0	1	7

Sheet B	1	2	3	4	5	6	7	8	Final
Canada (Anderson)	0	1	0	0	2	0	3	1	7
Sweden (Noréen) 🔨	1	0	0	1	0	2	0	0	4

Sheet C	1	2	3	4	5	6	7	8	Final
Latvia (Kāpostiņa) 🔨	0	0	2	0	0	1	1	X	4
Scotland (Lockhart)	1	1	0	3	2	0	0	X	7

Sheet D	1	2	3	4	5	6	7	8	Final
Ireland (Sinclair)	0	0	1	0	0	2	3	0	6
Switzerland (Gafner) 🔨	2	0	0	1	4	0	0	1	8

==== Draw 9 ====
Sunday, April 23, 8:00 pm

Sheet A	1	2	3	4	5	6	7	8	9	Final
United States (Smith)	0	3	0	0	2	3	0	0	0	8
Japan (Kawamura) 🔨	3	0	1	1	0	0	2	1	1	9

Sheet B	1	2	3	4	5	6	7	8	Final
Hong Kong (Hung) 🔨	0	1	2	0	0	1	1	0	5
England (Harsch)	2	0	0	2	1	0	0	1	6

Sheet E	1	2	3	4	5	6	7	8	9	Final
Finland (Julkunen) 🔨	1	1	1	0	0	0	3	1	3	10
Latvia (Kāpostiņa)	0	0	0	1	2	4	0	0	0	7

Sheet F	1	2	3	4	5	6	7	8	Final
Scotland (Lockhart)	0	6	1	0	4	0	1	X	12
Czech Republic (Šafránková) 🔨	2	0	0	1	0	1	0	X	4

==== Draw 12 ====
Monday, April 24, 4:00 pm

Sheet A	1	2	3	4	5	6	7	8	Final
Scotland (Lockhart)	0	1	0	4	0	2	3	X	10
Ireland (Sinclair) 🔨	1	0	2	0	1	0	0	X	4

Sheet B	1	2	3	4	5	6	7	8	Final
Finland (Julkunen)	0	0	1	0	2	1	5	X	9
Czech Republic (Šafránková) 🔨	1	1	0	1	0	0	0	X	3

Sheet C	1	2	3	4	5	6	7	8	Final
Australia (Forge)	0	2	0	1	2	0	2	0	7
Switzerland (Gafner) 🔨	2	0	4	0	0	1	0	4	11

Sheet D	1	2	3	4	5	6	7	8	9	Final
Sweden (Noréen) 🔨	1	0	0	2	0	3	0	0	1	7
Lithuania (Jasaitienė)	0	1	1	0	2	0	1	1	0	6

Sheet E	1	2	3	4	5	6	7	8	Final
Hong Kong (Hung)	0	0	0	0	2	0	1	0	3
Japan (Kawamura) 🔨	1	0	1	1	0	1	0	2	6

Sheet F	1	2	3	4	5	6	7	8	Final
United States (Smith)	0	2	0	2	0	0	2	0	6
Canada (Anderson) 🔨	1	0	1	0	1	2	0	2	7

==== Draw 13 ====
Monday, April 24, 8:00 pm

Sheet E	1	2	3	4	5	6	7	8	Final
New Zealand (Olszewski) 🔨	0	0	0	0	0	0	X	X	0
England (Harsch)	3	4	1	2	1	4	X	X	15

==== Draw 14 ====
Tuesday, April 25, 8:00 am

Sheet A	1	2	3	4	5	6	7	8	Final
Switzerland (Gafner)	0	0	1	2	4	0	2	X	9
Czech Republic (Šafránková) 🔨	1	1	0	0	0	1	0	X	3

Sheet C	1	2	3	4	5	6	7	8	9	Final
Ireland (Sinclair)	2	0	3	0	2	0	0	0	2	9
Finland (Julkunen) 🔨	0	2	0	1	0	2	1	1	0	7

Sheet D	1	2	3	4	5	6	7	8	Final
Canada (Anderson) 🔨	0	3	0	3	1	0	1	X	8
Hong Kong (Hung)	1	0	1	0	0	1	0	X	3

Sheet F	1	2	3	4	5	6	7	8	Final
Lithuania (Jasaitienė)	0	1	0	3	0	0	2	0	6
Japan (Kawamura) 🔨	1	0	2	0	2	1	0	2	8

==== Draw 16 ====
Tuesday, April 25, 4:00 pm

Sheet E	1	2	3	4	5	6	7	8	Final
United States (Smith) 🔨	1	0	0	2	0	3	0	0	6
Sweden (Noréen)	0	2	2	0	2	0	0	1	7

==== Draw 17 ====
Tuesday, April 25, 8:00 pm

Sheet A	1	2	3	4	5	6	7	8	Final
New Zealand (Olszewski)	2	0	1	0	0	1	0	X	4
Canada (Anderson) 🔨	0	1	0	3	1	0	3	X	8

Sheet B	1	2	3	4	5	6	7	8	Final
Scotland (Lockhart) 🔨	1	1	0	1	1	0	3	X	7
Australia (Forge)	0	0	1	0	0	1	0	X	2

Sheet C	1	2	3	4	5	6	7	8	Final
England (Harsch)	0	0	0	1	2	0	2	0	5
Japan (Kawamura) 🔨	1	0	1	0	0	4	0	1	7

Sheet F	1	2	3	4	5	6	7	8	Final
Czech Republic (Šafránková) 🔨	2	0	0	5	0	0	0	0	7
Latvia (Kāpostiņa)	0	0	2	0	1	4	1	2	10

==== Draw 19 ====
Wednesday, April 26, 12:00 pm

Sheet A	1	2	3	4	5	6	7	8	Final
England (Harsch) 🔨	0	2	0	0	3	0	4	0	9
Lithuania (Jasaitienė)	2	0	3	3	0	1	0	3	12

==== Draw 20 ====
Wednesday, April 26, 4:00 pm

Sheet B	1	2	3	4	5	6	7	8	Final
Latvia (Kāpostiņa) 🔨	0	0	0	1	0	0	1	X	2
Ireland (Sinclair)	2	2	0	0	1	1	0	X	6

Sheet C	1	2	3	4	5	6	7	8	Final
Czech Republic (Šafránková)	2	0	1	3	0	1	0	1	8
Australia (Forge) 🔨	0	1	0	0	2	0	0	0	3

Sheet D	1	2	3	4	5	6	7	8	Final
Japan (Kawamura) 🔨	0	2	0	3	1	1	1	X	8
Sweden (Noréen)	1	0	0	0	0	0	0	X	1

Sheet F	1	2	3	4	5	6	7	8	Final
New Zealand (Olszewski)	0	0	0	1	2	1	0	X	4
Hong Kong (Hung) 🔨	2	5	6	0	0	0	4	X	17

==== Draw 21 ====
Wednesday, April 26, 8:00 pm

Sheet B	1	2	3	4	5	6	7	8	Final
Switzerland (Gafner) 🔨	1	4	2	0	0	1	X	X	8
Finland (Julkunen)	0	0	0	1	1	0	X	X	2

Sheet C	1	2	3	4	5	6	7	8	Final
Canada (Anderson) 🔨	3	1	2	1	0	2	X	X	9
Lithuania (Jasaitienė)	0	0	0	0	1	0	X	X	1

Sheet D	1	2	3	4	5	6	7	8	Final
England (Harsch)	0	0	0	1	0	0	X	X	1
United States (Smith) 🔨	1	1	1	0	2	4	X	X	9

==== Draw 23 ====
Thursday, April 27, 12:00 pm

Sheet B	1	2	3	4	5	6	7	8	Final
Japan (Kawamura) 🔨	4	2	3	0	2	4	X	X	15
New Zealand (Olszewski)	0	0	0	1	0	0	X	X	1

Sheet C	1	2	3	4	5	6	7	8	Final
Hong Kong (Hung)	0	1	1	0	0	1	0	0	3
United States (Smith) 🔨	1	0	0	1	1	0	2	1	6

Sheet F	1	2	3	4	5	6	7	8	9	Final
Latvia (Kāpostiņa) 🔨	0	1	0	0	1	2	1	0	0	5
Switzerland (Gafner)	1	0	1	1	0	0	0	2	3	8

==== Draw 24 ====
Thursday, April 27, 4:00 pm

Sheet D	1	2	3	4	5	6	7	8	Final
Finland (Julkunen) 🔨	0	1	0	0	0	0	X	X	1
Scotland (Lockhart)	1	0	7	2	2	6	X	X	18

Sheet E	1	2	3	4	5	6	7	8	Final
England (Harsch)	0	1	0	1	0	0	X	X	2
Canada (Anderson) 🔨	5	0	1	0	0	3	X	X	9

==== Draw 25 ====
Thursday, April 27, 8:00 pm

Sheet C	1	2	3	4	5	6	7	8	Final
Sweden (Noréen)	3	1	3	0	1	0	X	X	8
New Zealand (Olszewski) 🔨	0	0	0	1	0	1	X	X	2

Sheet E	1	2	3	4	5	6	7	8	Final
Ireland (Sinclair)	1	2	0	0	1	0	0	1	5
Australia (Forge) 🔨	0	0	1	1	0	1	1	0	4

Sheet F	1	2	3	4	5	6	7	8	Final
Hong Kong (Hung) 🔨	1	0	4	2	0	0	1	X	8
Lithuania (Jasaitienė)	0	1	0	0	3	2	0	X	6

=== Playoffs ===
Qualification games
B2	Switzerland	7
A3	Sweden	4
A2	Japan	5
B3	Ireland	4

Semifinals
A1	Canada	7
B2	Switzerland	3
B1	Scotland	7
A2	Japan	2

Gold medal game
A1	Canada	8
B1	Scotland	4
Bronze medal game
B2	Switzerland	4
A2	Japan	6

==== Qualification games ====
Friday, April 28, 1:00 pm

Sheet F	1	2	3	4	5	6	7	8	Final
Switzerland (Gafner) 🔨	0	1	0	2	0	1	1	2	7
Sweden (Noréen)	1	0	2	0	1	0	0	0	4

Sheet A	1	2	3	4	5	6	7	8	Final
Japan (Kawamura) 🔨	0	1	0	1	0	0	2	1	5
Ireland (Sinclair)	0	0	2	0	0	2	0	0	4

==== Semifinals ====
Friday, April 28, 7:00 pm

Sheet C	1	2	3	4	5	6	7	8	Final
Scotland (Lockhart) 🔨	1	0	1	1	0	2	2	X	7
Japan (Kawamura)	0	1	0	0	1	0	0	X	2

Sheet D	1	2	3	4	5	6	7	8	Final
Canada (Anderson) 🔨	1	2	0	0	3	0	1	X	7
Switzerland (Gafner)	0	0	1	1	0	1	0	X	3

==== Bronze medal game ====
Saturday, April 29, 10:30 am

Sheet E	1	2	3	4	5	6	7	8	Final
Switzerland (Gafner)	0	0	3	0	1	0	0	X	4
Japan (Kawamura) 🔨	2	1	0	1	0	1	1	X	6

==== Gold medal game ====
Saturday, April 29, 10:30 am

Sheet B	1	2	3	4	5	6	7	8	Final
Canada (Anderson) 🔨	0	3	0	0	0	3	2	X	8
Scotland (Lockhart)	0	0	2	1	1	0	0	X	4

=== Final standings ===
Place	Team
1st place, gold medalist(s)	Canada
2nd place, silver medalist(s)	Scotland
3rd place, bronze medalist(s)	Japan
4	Switzerland
5	Ireland
5	Sweden
7	United States
8	Finland
9	England
10	Latvia
11	Czech Republic
12	Hong Kong
13	Australia
14	New Zealand
15	Lithuania
