= Rich Moffatt =

Canadian curler

- Curler

Team
- Curling club: Rideau CC, Ottawa, ON
- Skip: Howard Rajala
- Third: Rich Moffatt
- Second: Chris Fulton
- Lead: Paul Madden
- Alternate: Phil Daniel

Curling career
- Member Association: Ontario
- Brier: 1 (1999)
Medal record
Curling
Representing Canada
World Senior Championships
| Gold medal – first place | 2023 Gangneung |

Richard Moffatt (born 1959) is a Canadian curler from Ottawa, Ontario. In 1999, he became only the third curler to skip an Ottawa-area team at the Brier.

Moffatt began curling in 1973 after quitting ice hockey. As a junior curler, he made it to the playoffs of the 1981 Ontario Junior Curling Championships. He played in his first Ontario men's championship in 1988 throwing third rocks for Rick Bachand.

Moffatt skipped his own team for much of his career. In 1999, he finally won the Ontario men's championship, qualifying him for the 1999 Labatt Brier. At the Brier, his rink from the Rideau Curling Club finished with a 6-5 record.

Moffatt retired from curling in 2007, but quickly changed his mind and came back to play for Bryan Cochrane. He played with Cochrane until 2012. Moffatt joined up with Howard Rajala (as his third) to win the 2013 Ontario Senior curling championships. He won three more provincial senior titles with Rajala in 2017, 2020 and 2022; the team followed up by winning the 2023 World Senior Curling Championships for Canada.

== Personal life ==
Moffatt attended Carleton University for political science.
