= List of curling clubs in Canada =

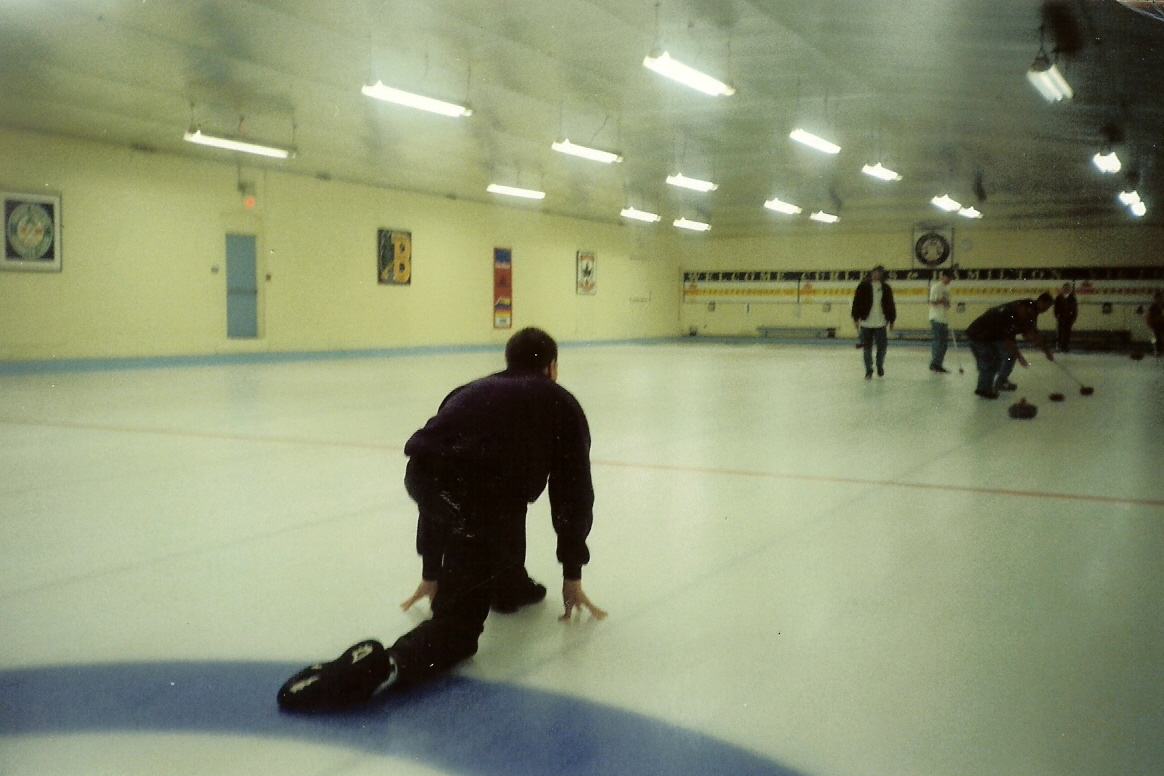
Curling at the Hamilton Victoria Club in Hamilton, Ontario

The following are lists of curling clubs in Canada. According to Curling Canada, there are nearly 1000 curling clubs in the country.

== A–B ==
- Assiniboine Memorial Curling Club
- Brandon Curling Club
- Brantford Golf & Country Club
- Buckingham Curling Club
- Burlington Curling Club

== C ==
- Caledonian Curling Club
- Calgary Curling Club
- Cataraqui Golf and Country Club
- Charleswood Curling Club
- Chatham Granite Club
- Cornwall Curling Club
- Crestwood Curling Club

== E–K ==
- East St. Paul Curling Club
- Fort Rouge Curling Club
- Fort William Curling Club
- Garrison Golf and Curling Club
- Granite Curling Club (Winnipeg)
- Hamilton Victoria Club
- High Park Club
- Halifax Curling Club
- Kelowna Curling Club
- KW Granite Club

== L–Q ==
- Leaside Curling Club
- Lethbridge Curling Club
- Mayflower Curling Club
- Mississaugua Golf & Country Club
- Nanaimo Curling Club
- Nutana Curling Club
- Ottawa Curling Club
- Ottawa Hunt and Golf Club
- Quinte Curling Club

== R ==
- RA Centre
- Red Deer Curling Club
- Richmond Curling Centre
- Richmond Hill Curling Club
- Rideau Curling Club
- Royal Canadian Curling Club
- Royal City Curling Club
- The Royal Glenora Club
- Royal Kingston Curling Club
- Royal Montreal Curling Club

== S ==
- Saville Community Sports Centre
- Scarboro Golf and Country Club
- Soo Curlers Association
- St. George's Golf and Country Club
- St. John's Curling Club
- St. Vital Curling Club
- Steinbach Curling Club
- Sutherland Curling Club

== T–W ==
- The Glencoe Club
- The Granite Club
- Toronto Cricket, Skating and Curling Club
- Unionville Curling Club
- Victoria Curling Club
- Westmount Golf and Country Club
- Weston Golf and Country Club
