= List of curling clubs in Ontario =

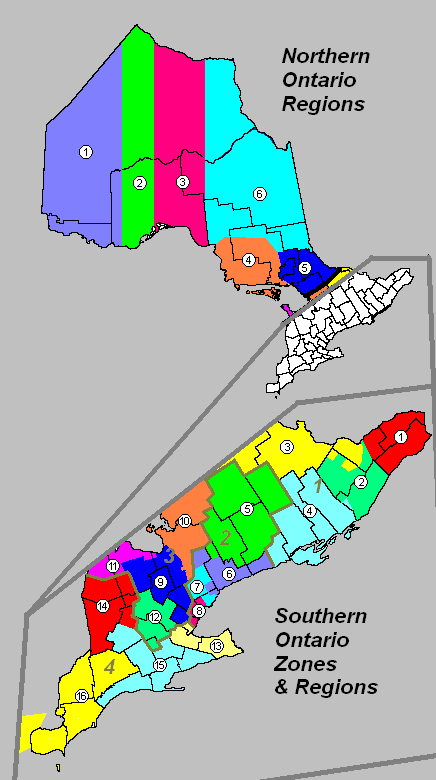
Zone and Region map of Ontario. Southern Ontario's 16 zones are organized into 4 regions, outlined and numbered in dark tan on the map

Curling clubs in the Canadian province of Ontario are organized into the Ontario Curling Association in southern Ontario and the Northern Ontario Curling Association in Northern Ontario.

== Ontario Curling Association clubs ==
The OCA divides its clubs into 16 geographical regions:

=== Zone 1 ===
Curling club	Municipality	Community/ Neighbourhood	Sheets
Alexandria Curling Club	North Glengarry	Alexandria	3
Cornwall Curling Centre	Cornwall	Downtown	6
Cumberland Curling Club	Ottawa	Cumberland	2
Glengarry Curling Club	North Glengarry	Maxville	3
Lancaster & District Curling Club	South Glengarry	Lancaster	2
Metcalfe Curling Club	Ottawa	Metcalfe	3
Morrisburg Curling Club	South Dundas	Morrisburg	3
Navan Curling Club	Ottawa	Navan	4
Ottawa Curling Club	Ottawa	Centretown	5
RCMP Curling Club	Ottawa	Manor Park	4
Russell Curling Club	Russell	Russell	4
Vankleek Hill Curling Club	Champlain	Vankleek Hill	2
Winchester Curling Club	North Dundas	Winchester	3

=== Zone 2 ===
Curling club	Municipality	Community/ Neighbourhood	Sheets
Almonte Curling Club	Mississippi Mills	Almonte	4
Brockville Country Club	Brockville	West end	6
Gananoque Curling Club	Gananoque	Downtown	4
Manotick Curling Center	Ottawa	Manotick	3
North Grenville Curling Club	North Grenville	Kemptville	5
Ottawa Hunt & Golf Club	Ottawa	Airport-Uplands	6
Perth Curling Club	Perth	Downtown	3
Prescott Curling Club	Prescott	Downtown	3
RA Curling Club	Ottawa	Confederation Heights	6
RCN (Navy) Curling Club	Ottawa	Dow's Lake	4
Rideau Curling Club	Ottawa	Centretown	5
Smiths Falls Curling Club	Smiths Falls	South end	4

=== Zone 3 ===
Curling club	Municipality	Community/ Neighbourhood	Sheets
Arnprior Curling Club	Arnprior	South end	4
Carleton Heights Curling Club	Ottawa	Carleton Heights	4
Carleton Place Curling Club	Carleton Place	East end	4
City View Curling Club	Ottawa	City View	4
Deep River Curling & Squash Club	Deep River	South end	4
Granite Curling Club of West Ottawa	Ottawa	Westboro	4
Huntley Curling Club	Ottawa	Carp	4
Lanark Highlands Curling Club	Lanark Highlands	McDonalds Corners	
Pakenham Curling Club	Mississippi Mills	Pakenham	2
Pembroke Curling Club	Pembroke	Downtown	4
Renfrew Curling Club	Renfrew	Downtown	4
Richmond Curling Club	Ottawa	Richmond	4

=== Zone 4 ===
Curling club	Municipality	Community/ Neighbourhood	Sheets
Brighton & District Curling Club	Brighton	Brighton village	4
Campbellford & District Curling & Racquet Club	Trent Hills	Campbellford	4
Cataraqui Golf and Country Club	Kingston	Country Club Estates	6
Colborne Curling Club	Cramahe	Colborne	2
Garrison Golf & Curling Club	Kingston	CFB Kingston	4
Land O'Lakes Curling Club	Tweed	Tweed village	4
Loonie Curling Club	Rideau Lakes	Chaffeys Locks	1
Marmora & Area Curling Club	Marmora and Lake	Marmora	4
Napanee & District Curling Club	Greater Napanee	Napanee	4
Prince Edward Curling Club	Prince Edward	Picton	4
Quinte Curling Club	Belleville	West end	4
Royal Kingston Curling Club	Kingston	Reddendale	6
Stirling Curling Club	Stirling-Rawdon	Stirling	4
Trenton Curling Club	Quinte West	Trenton	4

=== Zone 5 ===
Curling club	Municipality	Community/ Neighbourhood	Sheets
Bancroft Curling Club	Bancroft	Bancroft village	4
Beaverton Curling Club	Brock	Beaverton	4
Bobcaygeon Curling Club	Kawartha Lakes	Bobcaygeon	4
Cannington Curling Club	Brock	Cannington	3
Ennismore Curling Club	Smith–Ennismore–Lakefield	Ennismore	4
Fenelon Falls Curling Club	Kawartha Lakes	Fenelon Falls	4
Haliburton Curling Club	Dysart et al	Haliburton	4
Lakefield Curling Club	Smith–Ennismore–Lakefield	Lakefield	4
Lindsay Curling Club	Kawartha Lakes	Lindsay	6
Minden Curling Club	Minden Hills	Minden	4
Oakwood Curling Club	Kawartha Lakes	Oakwood	3
Omemee Curling Club	Kawartha Lakes	Omemee	4
Peterborough Curling Club	Cavan-Monaghan	Murray Hill	6
Peterborough Golf & Country Club	Peterborough	Clearview Heights	4
Wilberforce Curling Club	Highlands East	Wilberforce	2
Woodville Curling Club	Kawartha Lakes	Woodville	2

=== Zone 6 ===
Curling club	Municipality	Community/ Neighbourhood	Sheets
Oshawa Curling Club	Oshawa	Downtown	8
Port Perry Community Curling Club	Scugog	Port Perry	4
Sutton Curling Club	Georgina	Sutton	4
Tam Heather Curling & Tennis Club	Toronto	Morningside	8
Unionville Curling Club	Markham	Unionville	4
Uxbridge & District Curling Club	Uxbridge	Uxbridge village	4
West Northumberland Curling Club	Cobourg	Downtown	5
Whitby Curling Club	Whitby	Downtown	6

=== Zone 7 ===
Curling club	Municipality	Community/ Neighbourhood	Sheets
Donalda Curling Club	Toronto	Don Mills	4
East York Curling Club	Toronto	Woodbine-Lumsden	6
Granite Club	Toronto	Bridle Path	8
Leaside Curling Club	Toronto	Leaside	8
Richmond Hill Curling Club	Richmond Hill	Elgin Mills	6
Suburban Schoolmasters Curling Club	Toronto	Leaside	0*
The Thornhill Club	Vaughan	Thornhill	6
Toronto Cricket Skating & Curling Club	Toronto	Hoggs Hollow	6
York Curling Club	Newmarket	Downtown	6

* Club plays at the Leaside Curling Club

=== Zone 8 ===
Curling club	Municipality	Community/ Neighbourhood	Sheets
Dixie Curling Club	Mississauga	Applewood Heights	6
High Park Club	Toronto	Roncesvalles	5
Humber Curlers	Mississauga	Port Credit	1*
Mississaugua Golf & Country Club	Mississauga	Port Credit	6
Oakville Curling Club	Oakville	Old Oakville	8
Royal Canadian Curling Club	Toronto	Riverdale	6

* Club plays at the Mississaugua Golf & Country Club

=== Zone 9 ===
Curling club	Municipality	Community/ Neighbourhood	Sheets
Acton Curling Club	Halton Hills	Acton	4
Alliston Curling Club	New Tecumseth	Alliston	4
Brampton Curling Club	Brampton	Downtown	6
Chinguacousy Curling Club	Brampton	Bramalea	6
Creemore Curling Club	Clearview	Creemore	2
King Curling Club	King	Schomberg	4
Milton Curling Club	Milton	Milton	4
Orangeville Curling Club	Orangeville	Northeast end	4
Shelburne Curling Club	Shelburne	Downtown	4
Stayner Granite Club	Clearview	Stayner	4
The Club at North Halton	Halton Hills	Georgetown	4

=== Zone 10 ===
Curling club	Municipality	Community/ Neighbourhood	Sheets
Bala Curling Club	Muskoka Lakes	Bala	2
Barrie Curling Club	Barrie	Allandale	7
Baysville Curling Club	Lake of Bays	Baysville	2
Bradford and District Curling Club	Bradford West Gwillimbury	Bradford	4
Coldwater and District Curling Club	Severn	Coldwater	4
Cookstown Curling Club	Innisfil	Cookstown	4
Elmvale Curling Club	Springwater	Elmvale	2
Gravenhurst Curling Club	Gravenhurst	Downtown	6
Huntsville Curling Club	Huntsville	Downtown	4
MacTier Curling Club	Georgian Bay	MacTier	2
Midland Curling Club	Midland	Central	5
Orillia Curling Club	Orillia	East end	6
Parry Sound Curling Club	Parry Sound	Downtown	4
Penetanguishene Curling Club	Penetanguishene	Penetang	6
Port Carling Curling Club	Muskoka Lakes	Port Carling	2
South Muskoka Curling and Golf Club	Bracebridge	Bracebridge town	4
Stroud Curling Club	Innisfil	Stroud	5

=== Zone 11 ===
- Allenford Curling Club - Allenford
- Blue Water Curling Club - Owen Sound
- Chesley Curling Club - Chesley
- Curling Club of Collingwood - Collingwood
- Grey Granite Club - Owen Sound
- Markdale Golf and Curling Club - Markdale
- Meaford Curling Club - Meaford
- Paisley Curling Club - Paisley
- Port Elgin Curling Club - Port Elgin
- Southampton Curling Club - Southampton
- Tara Curling Club - Tara
- Wiarton Curling Club - Wiarton

=== Zone 12 ===
- Arthur & Area Curling Club - Arthur
- Ayr Curling Club - Ayr
- Elmira & District Curling Club - Elmira
- Elora Curling Club - Elora
- Fergus Curling Club - Fergus
- Galt Country Club - Cambridge
- Galt Curling Club - Cambridge
- Guelph Country Club - Guelph
- Guelph Curling Club - Guelph
- Kitchener-Waterloo Granite Club - Waterloo
- Plattsville Curling Club - Plattsville
- Westmount Golf & Country Club - Kitchener

=== Zone 13 ===
- Burlington Curling Club - Burlington
- Burlington Golf & Country Club - Burlington
- Dundas Granite Curling Club - Dundas
- Dundas Valley Golf & Curling Club - Dundas
- Glanford Curling Club - Mount Hope
- Glendale Golf & Country Club - Hamilton
- Grimsby Curling Club - Grimsby
- Hamilton Victoria Club - Hamilton
- Niagara Falls Curling Club - Niagara Falls
- St. Catharines Curling Club - St. Catharines
- St. Catharines Golf & Country Club - St. Catharines
- Welland Curling Club - Welland

=== Zone 14 ===
- Durham Curling Club - Durham
- Exeter Curling Club - Exeter
- Hanover Curling Club - Hanover
- Harriston Curling Club - Harriston
- Kincardine Curling Club - Kincardine
- Listowel Curling Club - Listowel
- Maitland Country Club - Goderich
- Mount Forest Curling Club - Mount Forest
- Palmerston Curling Club - Palmerston
- Ripley Curling Club - Ripley
- Seaforth Curling Club - Seaforth
- Teeswater Curling Club - Teeswater
- Vanastra Curling Club - Clinton
- Walkerton Golf & Curling Club - Walkerton
- Wingham Golf & Curling Club - Wingham

=== Zone 15 ===
Curling club	Municipality	Community/ Neighbourhood	Sheets
Aylmer Curling Club	Aylmer	Aylmer	4
Brant Curling Club	Brantford	Holmedale	5
Brantford Golf & Country Club	Brantford	Golfdale	6
Ingersoll & District Curling Club	Ingersoll	Ingersoll	4
Norwich District Curling Club	Norwich	Norwich	4
Paris Curling Club	County of Brant	Paris	4
Simcoe Curling Club	Norfolk County	Simcoe	4
St. Marys Curling Club	St. Marys	St. Marys	4
St. Thomas Curling Club	St. Thomas	St. Thomas	6
Stratford Country Club	Stratford	Stratford	4
Tavistock Curling Club	East Zorra-Tavistock	Tavistock	
Tillsonburg & District Curling Club	Tillsonburg	Tillsonburg	4
Woodstock Curling Club	Woodstock	Woodstock	4

=== Zone 16 ===
Curling club	Municipality	Community/ Neighbourhood	Sheets
Beach Grove Golf & Country Club	Tecumseh, Ontario	St. Clair Beach, Ontario	4
Capri Pizzeria Recreation Complex	Windsor, Ontario	South Windsor, Ontario	5
Chatham Granite Club	Chatham-Kent, Ontario	Chatham, Ontario	5
Detroit Curling Club	Oakland County, Michigan	Ferndale, Michigan	4
Forest Curling & Social Club	Lambton Shores, Ontario	Forest, Ontario	4
Glencoe & District Curling Club	Southwest Middlesex, Ontario	Glencoe, Ontario	5
Golden Acres Curling Club	Chatham-Kent, Ontario	Blenheim, Ontario	4
Highland Community Curling Club	London, Ontario	Highland, London, Ontario	6
Ilderton Curling Club	Middlesex Centre, Ontario	Ilderton, Ontario	4
London Curling Club	London, Ontario	Central London, Ontario	6
Ridgetown Golf & Curling Club	Chatham-Kent, Ontario	Ridgetown, Ontario	4
Sarnia Golf & Curling Club	Point Edward, Ontario	Point Edward, Ontario	8
Sun Parlour Curling Club	Leamington, Ontario	Leamington, Ontario	4
Sydenham Community Curling Club	Chatham-Kent, Ontario	Wallaceburg, Ontario	4

== Northern Ontario Curling Association ==
=== Region 1 ===
- Red Lake District Curling Club - Balmertown
- Kenora Curling Club - Kenora
- Atikokan Curling Club - Atikokan
- Ojiway Curling Club - Sioux Lookout
- Fort Frances Curling Club - Fort Frances
- Eagles' Landing Golf & Curling Club - Dryden
- Keewatin Curling Club - Keewatin
- Rainy River Curling Club - Rainy River
- Red Lake District Curling Club - Red Lake

=== Region 2 ===
- Fort William Curling Club - Thunder Bay
- Port Arthur Curling Club - Thunder Bay
- Thunder Bay Curling Club - Thunder Bay
- Kakabeka Falls Curling Club - Kakabeka Falls

=== Region 3 ===
- C & D Paul Curling Club - Hornepayne
- Nipigon Curling Club - Nipigon
- Red Rock Curling Club - Red Rock
- Marathon Curling Club - Marathon
- Terrace Bay Curling Club - Terrace Bay
- White River Curling Club - White River
- Manitouwadge Curling Club - Manitouwadge
- Geraldton Curling Club - Geraldton
- Longlac Curling Club - Longlac

=== Region 4 ===
- Deer Trail Curling Club - Elliot Lake
- Espanola Curling Club - Espanola
- Gore Bay Curling Club - Gore Bay
- Little Current Curling Club - Little Current
- Assiginack Curling Club - Manitowaning
- Mindemoya Curling Club - Mindemoya
- Providence Bay Curling Club - Mindemoya
- Blind River Curling Club - Blind River
- Soo Curlers Association - Sault Ste. Marie
- Tarentorus Curling Club - Sault Ste. Marie
- Thessalon Curling Club - Thessalon
- Wawa Curling Club - Wawa

=== Region 5 ===
- 22nd Wing Curling Club - North Bay
- North Bay Granite Club - North Bay
- Sturgeon Falls Curling Club - Sturgeon Falls
- Mattawa Curling Club - Mattawa
- Nosbonsing Curling Club - Astorville
- Powassan Curling Club - Powassan
- South River Curling Club - South River
- Capreol Curling Club - Capreol
- Coniston Curling Club - Coniston
- Copper Cliff Curling Club - Copper Cliff
- Falconbridge Curling Club - Falconbridge
- Idylwylde Golf & Country Club - Sudbury
- Onaping Curling Club - Levack
- Sudbury Curling Club - Sudbury

=== Region 6 ===
- Cobalt-Haileybury Curling Club - Haileybury
- Cochrane Curling Club - Cochrane
- Englehart Curling Club - Englehart
- Hearst Curling Club - Hearst
- Horne Granite Curling Club - New Liskeard
- Iroquois Falls Curling Club - Iroquois Falls
- Kapuskasing Curling Club - Kapuskasing
- Kirkland Lake Curling Club - Kirkland Lake
- McIntyre Curling Club - Schumacher
- Smooth Rock Falls Curling Club - Smooth Rock Falls
- Stratton Curling Club - Stratton
