= Ontario U20 Curling Championships =

The Ontario U20 Curling Championships (until 2016 called the Ontario Junior Curling Championships) is an annual curling tournament. It is the provincial curling championship for curling teams aged 20 and under in Southern Ontario. The winning team represents Ontario at the Canadian Junior Curling Championships.

== Men's winners ==
Until 1978, the event was known as the provincial schoolboy championship. Since 1979, there have been two separate events.

Year	Skip	Club
1950	Glen Sagle	Sault Ste. Marie Collegiate Institute
1951	Mike Cassels	Hamilton Westdale Collegiate
1952	Jack Mosley	Lindsay Collegiate
1953	Bob Walker	Oshawa Collegiate Institute
1954	Bill Fraser	Sarnia Collegiate Institute
1955	Bill Fraser	Sarnia Collegiate Institute
1956	Bill Fraser	Sarnia Collegiate Institute
1957	Ian Johnston	Kingston Collegiate and Vocational Institute
1958	Gordon Stibbards	Welland High & Vocational
1959	Irwin Wallace	Parry Sound Curling Club
1960	Bob Estall	Kingston Collegiate and Vocational Institute
1961	Ron Bobbie	Kitchener-Waterloo CVS
1962	Wally Smith	Banting Memorial High School
1963	Jerry Blair	West Hill Secondary
1964	John Harris	Owen Sound Collegiate
1965	Paul Savage	Don Mills Collegiate
1966	Mike Boyd	Kingston Collegiate
1967	Barry Timbers	Uxbridge Secondary School
1968	Bill Hope	Trenton High School
1969	George Cox	Renfrew District Collegiate Institute
1970	Fred Osburn	J.F. Ross Collegiate and Vocational Institute
1971	Mark McDonald	Gananoque Secondary School
1972	Mark McDonald	Gananoque Secondary School
1973	Mark McDonald	Gananoque Secondary School
1974	Peter File	Brampton Centennial Secondary
1975	Dave Velanoff	London Westminster Secondary
1976	Ken Pearce	Victoria Park Secondary
1977	Barry Acton	Uxbridge Secondary School
1978	Daryl Shane	Hanover John Diefenbaker Secondary
1979	Nick Rizzo	Brant Curling Club
1980	John Kawaja	St. George's Golf and Country Club
1981	John Base	Oakville Curling Club
1982	John Base	Mississaugua Golf & Country Club
1983	Daniel Lachance	Rockcliffe Curling Club
1984	Steve Hartley	Thornhill Country Club
1985	Fred Hackel	London Curling Club
1986	Mike Harris	Tam Heather Curling Club
1987	Wayne Middaugh	Brampton Curling Club
1988	Daryl Morrell	Morrisburg Curling Club
1989	Dave Allan	Kingston Curling Club
1990	Noel Herron	Kingston Curling Club
1991	Peter Steski	Forest Curling Club
1992	Adam Spencer	Guelph Curling Club
1993	Joe Frans	St. Catharines Golf and Country Club
1994	Joe Frans	Bradford and District Curling Club
1995	Patrick Ferris	Peterborough Curling Club
1996	Patrick Ferris	Sutton Curling Club
1997	John Morris	Ottawa Curling Club
1998	John Morris	Ottawa Curling Club
1999	John Morris	Ottawa Curling Club
2000	Jason Young	Burlington Curling Club
2001	Bobby Reid	High Park Club
2002	Jeff Armstrong	Blue Water Curling Club
2003	Mark Bice	Sarnia Golf and Curling Club
2004	John Epping	Granite Club
2005	Mark Bice	Sarnia Golf and Curling Club
2006	Codey Maus	Dixie Curling Club
2007	Ryan Myler	Brampton Curling Club
2008	Travis Fanset	St. Thomas Curling Club
2009	Bowie Abbis-Mills	Kitchener-Waterloo Granite Club
2010	Jake Walker	Westmount Golf and Country Club
2011	Mathew Camm	Ottawa Curling Club
2012	Brett Dekoning	Omemee Curling Club
2013	Aaron Squires	St. Thomas Curling Club
2014	Ryan McCrady	Rideau Curling Club
2015	Mac Calwell	Quinte Curling Club
2016	Doug Kee	Navan Curling Club
2017	Matthew Hall	Westmount Golf and Country Club
2018	Matthew Hall	Westmount Golf and Country Club
2019	Samuel Steep	Galt Country Club
2020	Owen Purdy	Cataraqui Golf & Country Club
2021 (Note: The 2021 event was cancelled due to the COVID-19 pandemic in Ontario and was replaced with a qualifier for the 2021 World Junior Qualification Event)	Scott Mitchell	Whitby Curling Club
2022	Landan Rooney	Whitby Curling Club
2023	Jayden King	RCMP Curling Club
2024	Kibo Mulima	Guelph Curling Club
2025	Tyler MacTavish	KW Granite Club
2026	Evan MacDougall	Fergus Curling Club

== Women's winners ==
Year	Skip	Club
1972	Judy Jamieson	Ottawa Curling Club
1973	Sandy Hushagen	Humber Highland Curling Club
1974	Cathy Scheel	Arnprior Curling Club
1975	Sheryl Keely	Kingston Curling Club
1976	Sheryl Keely	Kingston Curling Club
1977	Deborah Brown	St. George's Golf and Country Club
1978	Becki Ross	Idylwylde Country Club
1979	Wendy McCullough	Kingston Curling Club
1980	Patricia Barnaby	RA Curling Club
1981	Barbara Boake	St. George's Golf and Country Club
1982	Alison Goring	Bayview Country Club
1983	Alison Goring	Bayview Country Club
1984	Kristin Holman	Bayview Country Club
1985	Susan Shepley	Dixie Curling Club
1986	Lisa Lascelles	Hylands Curling Club
1987	Janet Omand	Sarnia Golf and Curling Club
1988	Nadine Landon	Thessalon Curling Club
1989	Tara Stevenson	London Curling Club
1990	Nathalie Hoffman	Hawkesbury Curling Club
1991	Debbie Green	Unionville Curling Club
1992	Heather Crockett	Unionville Curling Club
1993	Kim Gellard	Unionville Curling Club
1994	Dominique Lascelles	Hawkesbury Curling Club
1995	Kirsten Harmark	Milton Curling Club
1996	Denna Schell	Cannington Curling Club
1997	Sara Garland	Unionville Curling Club
1998	Jenn Hanna	Ottawa Curling Club
1999	Julie Reddick	Milton Curling Club
2000	Julie Reddick	Oakville Curling Club
2001	Carrie Lindner	Bradford and District Curling Club
2002	Julie Reddick	Oakville Curling Club
2003	Stephanie Gray	Palmerston Curling Club
2004	Kelly Cochrane	Peterborough Curling Club
2005	Erin Morrissey	Rideau Curling Club
2006	Lisa Farnell	Peterborough Curling Club
2007	Hollie Nicol	KW Granite Club
2008	Danielle Inglis	Burlington Curling Club
2009	Rachel Homan	Ottawa Curling Club
2010	Rachel Homan	Ottawa Curling Club
2011	Clancy Grandy	KW Granite Club
2012	Jamie Sinclair	Manotick Curling Center
2013	Jamie Sinclair	Manotick Curling Center
2014	Molly Greenwood	KW Granite Club
2015	Chelsea Brandwood	Glendale Golf & Country Club
2016	Courtney Auld	Bayview Golf & Country Club
2017	Hailey Armstrong	Rideau Curling Club
2018	Emma Wallingford	Ottawa Curling Club
2019	Thea Coburn	Dundas Valley Golf & Curling Club
2020	Sierra Sutherland	Rideau Curling Club
2021	Alyssa Blad	Dundas Valley Golf & Curling Club
2022	Emily Deschenes	Rideau Curling Club
2023	Tori Zemmelink	Navan Curling Club
2024	Julia Markle	London Curling Club
2025	Dominique Vivier	Navan Curling Club
2026	Dominique Vivier	RCMP Curling Club
