= Curling Ontario =

Governing body for curling in Southern Ontario

- Sport: Curling
- Jurisdiction: Regional
- Founded: 1875
- Affiliation: Curling Canada
- Headquarters: Pickering

Official website
- curlingontario.ca
- (Canada)

Curling Ontario (formerly the Ontario Curling Association and CurlON) is the governing body of curling in Southern Ontario. Northern Ontario is governed by the Northern Ontario Curling Association (NOCA). The Curling Ontario sends a team to represent Team Ontario at all major Canadian Championships. The NOCA sends a separate team to all of these events.

Logo in use while the organization was branded as CurlON

Curling Ontario was founded in 1875 as the Ontario Curling Association. It was renamed CurlON in 2016 and as Curling Ontario in 2024.

In 2026, it was announced that Curling Ontario is proposing to merge with the Northern Ontario Curling Association and the Ontario Curling Council (which exists to deal with federal funding).

== Championships ==
=== Ontario Tankard ===
The Ontario Tankard is the provincial championship for men's curling. The winner represents Team Ontario at The Brier.

Previous names:

- Ontario Silver Tankard: 1927–1931
- 1932: Round robin playoff between the winners of the Ontario Tankard, Canada Life Trophy and the Toronto Bonspiel.
- 1933: Winner was decided between a playoff between the winners of the Ontario Tankard and the Toronto Bonspiel.
- Ontario Tankard: 1934–1937
- British Consols: 1938–1979
- Labatt Tankard: 1980–1985
- Blue Light Tankard: 1986–1995
- Nokia Cup: 1996–2003
- Ontario Men's Curling Championship: 2004
- Kia Cup: 2005–2006
- TSC Stores Tankard: 2007–2009
- Ontario Men's Curling Championship: 2010
- The Dominion Tankard: 2011–2013
- Travelers Tankard: 2014
- Recharge with Milk Tankard: 2015–2017
- Dairy Farmers of Ontario Tankard: 2018
- Ontario Curling Championships: 2019–present

=== Ontario Women's Curling Championship ===
The Ontario Women's Curling Championship, formerly the Ontario Scotties Tournament of Hearts is the provincial championship for women's teams. Unlike the Dominion Tankard, the women's championship included teams from both southern and northern Ontario until 2015. The winner of the provincial championship goes on to play in the national championship. Because the national champion returns the previous years champion to the event, if that team is from Ontario, they cannot defend their provincial championship. The national championship has been running since 1962, but the provincial championship has existed since 1956.

=== U-21 (Juniors) ===
The U-21 provincial curling championships are held annually in early January. The tournament is for curlers 20 years old and younger. A men's tournament has been held since 1950 and the women's since 1972. The winning team represents Ontario at the Canadian Junior Curling Championships.

=== Mixed ===
National champions in bold.

| Year | Skip | Club |
|---|---|---|
| 1960 | Bayne Secord, Mrs. H. Croome, Don Campbell, Mrs. G. Fletcher | Tam O'Shanter |
| 1961 | Nick Raspa, Mrs. G. Dunfield, Mrs. J. Amos, James Amos | Weston |
| 1962 | Syd Smithers, Mrs. D. Babcock, G. Kersell, Mrs. M. Kersell | Galt |
| 1963 | Jack McAlpine, Mrs. D. McCowan, William Carson, Mrs. William Carson | Scarboro |
| 1964 | Mac White, Heather White, Ron Benn, Agnes Benn | Quinte |
| 1965 | Ray Grant, Helen Jewett, Keith Jewett, Mary Grant | Unionville |
| 1966 | Harvey Acton, Winnie Acton, Murray Taylor, Doris Taylor | Uxbridge |
| 1967 | Earle Hushagen, Nini Mutch, Don McEwen, Wyn Hushagen | Humber Highland |
| 1968 | Peter Connell, Donna Connell, Gordon Wrightsell, Isobel Munro | Arnprior Granite |
| 1969 | Terry Patton, Kathryn McKinley, Herbert McKinley, Shirley Patton | Brant |
| 1970 | Earle Hushagen, Wyn Hushagen, Don McEwen, Nini Mutch | Humber Highland |
| 1971 | Vince Lebano, Claudia Lebano, Jack Tyrrell, Barbara Tyrrell | Orillia |
| 1972 | Tom Cushing, Susan Cushing, Dave Phillips, Dee Dee Moses | Terrace |
| 1973 | George Kilmer, Corrine Kilmer, Dan Munroe, Barb Munroe | St. Catharines |
| 1974 | George Morrisey, Betty Houle, Larry Fisher, Eleanor White | Welland |
| 1975 | Dave Reid, Pat Reid, Terry Lindsey, Martha Lindsey | High Park |
| 1976 | Ted Brown, Kay O'Neill, Mike Boyd, Brenda Kuluk | Cataraqui Golf and Country Club |
| 1977 | Bob Woods, Carol Thompson, Bill Schultz, Eileen Appleton | Royals |
| 1978 | Bob Widdis, Yvonne Smith, Paul Carriere, Sandy Widdis | Humber Highland |
| 1979 | Bob Widdis, Yvonne Smith, Paul Carriere, Sandy Widdis | Humber Highland |
| 1980 | Wayne Oates, Barbara Maxwell, Brad Mitchell, Lonnie Whipple | Brighton |
| 1981 | Ken Buchan, Deanna Buchan, Tom Brown, Penny Brown | London |
| 1982 | Dave Van Dine, Muriel Winford, Joe Potter, Deborah Grant | RCMP |
| 1983 | Rich Vesey, Linda Smith, Clayton MacKay, Mary Lynn MacKay | Oshawa |
| 1984 | Peter File, Dale Carruthers, David Carruthers, Kim File | Brampton |
| 1985 | Garry Lumbard, Betty Pindera, Rob Quick, Joan Harder | Kingsville |
| 1986 | **Dave Van Dine, Dawn Ventura, Hugh Millikin, Cynthia Wiggins** | RCMP |
| 1987 | Scott McPherson, Cheryl McPherson, Stu Garner, Kristin Holman | Bayview |
| 1988 | Brian DeRooy, Bev Dekoning, Peter Dekoning, Eileen DeRooy | Chatham Granite |
| 1989 | Mike Harris, Lynette Greenwood, Drew Macklin, Judy Macklin | Tam Heather |
| 1990 | Bob Turcotte, Kristin Turcotte, Dick Howson, Andrea Lawes | Annandale |
| 1991 | Layne Noble, Grace Frey, Mike Johansen, Audrey Frey | Rideau |
| 1992 | Bob Turcotte, Kristin Turcotte, Dick Howson, Mary Bowman | Oshawa |
| 1993 | Dave Merklinger, Janet Merklinger, Bob Hanna, Valerie Hanna | Granite (Ottawa West) |
| 1994 | Bob Ingram, Paulina Rumfeldt, Rob Rumfeldt, Janice Ingram | Ridgetown |
| 1995 | Jim Marshall, Betty Kirouac, Paul MacDonald, Wendy Marshall | Trenton |
| 1996 | Rich Moffatt, Theresa Breen, Peter Woodcox, Denise Allan | Rideau |
| 1997 | Jim Hunker, Cathy Piccinin, Morgan Currie, Janice Remai | Rideau |
| 1998 | Dean Wadland, Cheryl McPherson, Paul Wadland, Marian Arai | Bayview |
| 1999 | Bob Turcotte, Kristin Turcotte, Roy Weigand, Andrea Lawes | Scarboro |
| 2000 | Dale Kelly, Julie Kelly, Shawn Hartle, Becky Philpott | Forest |
| 2001 | Howard Rajala, Darcie Simpson, Chris Fulton, Linda Fulton | Rideau |
| 2002 | Wayne Tuck, Jr., Kim Veale, Jake Higgs, Sara Gatchell | Ilderton |
| 2003 | Nick Rizzo, Jo-Ann Rizzo, Gareth Parry, Vicki Advent | Brant |
| 2004 | Heath McCormick, Denna Schell, Jason Young, Julie Colquhoun | Cannington |
| 2005 | Phil Daniel, Kerry Lackie, Spencer Townley, Kim Ambrose | Sun Parlour |
| 2006 | **John Epping, Julie Reddick, Scott Foster, Leigh Armstrong** | Oakville |
| 2007 | John Epping, Julie Reddick, Scott Foster, Leigh Armstrong | Oakville |
| 2008 | Bob Turcotte, Kristin Turcotte, Roy Weigand, Andrea Lawes | Scarboro |
| 2009 | Wayne Tuck, Jr., Kim Tuck, Jake Higgs, Sara Gatchell | Brantford |
| 2010 | Mark Bice, Leslie Bishop, Codey Maus, Courtney Davies | Sarnia |
| 2011 | Chris Gardner, Erin Morrissey, Brad Kidd, Kim Brown | Arnprior |
| 2012 | Mark Homan, Rachel Homan, Brian Fleischhaker, Alison Kreviazuk | Rideau |
| 2013 | **Cory Heggestad, Heather Graham, Greg Balsdon, Amy MacKay** | Orillia |
| 2014 | Cory Heggestad, Heather Graham, Greg Balsdon, Amy Balsdon | Orillia |
| 2015 | Chris Gardner, Trish Hill, Jonathan Beuk, Jessica Barcauskas | Ottawa |
| 2016 | Mike McLean, Brit O'Neill, Andrew Denny, Karen Sagle | Ottawa |
| 2017 | Wayne Tuck, Jr., Kimberly Tuck, Jake Higgs, Sara Gatchell | Ilderton |
| 2018 | **Mike Anderson, Danielle Inglis, Sean Harrison, Lauren Harrison** | Thornhill |
| 2019 | Wayne Tuck, Jr., Kimberly Tuck, Wesley Forget, Sara Gatchell | Ilderton |
| 2020 | Wayne Tuck, Jr., Kimberly Tuck, Jake Higgs, Sara Gatchell | Ilderton |
| 2021 | Mike McLean, Erin Morrissey, Kevin Tippett, Erica Hopson | Ottawa |
| 2022 | Scott McDonald, Lori Eddy, Matthew Hall, Laura Neil | St. Thomas |
| 2023 | Scott McDonald, Lori Eddy, Matthew Hall, Laura Neil | St. Thomas |
| 2024 | Jayden King, Grace Gave, Daniel Del Conte, Jillian Uniacke | Tillsonburg |
| 2025 | Sam Mooibroek, Emma Artichuk, Wyatt Small, Jamie Smith | KW Granite |
| 2026 | Cory Heggestad, Heather Heggestad, Samuel Steep, Lauren Wasylkiw | Stroud |

=== Seniors ===
The Ontario Senior Championship is for curlers over 50. The winner represents Ontario at the Canadian Senior Curling Championships.

| Year | Men's champion skip | Women's champion skip |
|---|---|---|
| 1965 | Alf Phillips, Sr. | |
| 1966 | Jim Johnston | |
| 1967 | Carl Asmussen | |
| 1968 | Andy Grant | |
| 1969 | Alf Phillips, Sr. | |
| 1970 | Alf Phillips, Sr. | |
| 1971 | Gord Wallace | |
| 1972 | Stewart Brown | |
| 1973 | Ed Rhodes | Fern Irwin |
| 1974 | Bill Riley | Joyce Black |
| 1975 | Bill Wagner | Shirley Pilson |
| 1976 | Jake Edwards | Lois Lawrie |
| 1977 | Jake Edwards | Shirley Keely |
| 1978 | Bill Wagner | Jo Wallace |
| 1979 | Bill Lewis | Jean Beardsley |
| 1980 | Mac White | Mary Ritchie |
| 1981 | Mac White | Barbara Baker |
| 1982 | Mac White | Shirley Pilson |
| 1983 | Jack Bryans | Betty Sim |
| 1984 | Earle Hushagen | Wyn Hushagen |
| 1985 | Steve Kot | June Shaw |
| 1986 | Earle Hushagen | Sirkka Tyynela |
| 1987 | Mac White | Jean Basset |
| 1988 | Howie Montone | Phyllis Nielson |
| 1989 | Jim Sharples | Ellie Kompch |
| 1990 | Bill Dickie | Jill Greenwood |
| 1991 | Bob Denney | Jean Beardsley |
| 1992 | Jim Sharples | Lorraine Coughlan |
| 1993 | Ken Buchan | Jill Greenwood |
| 1994 | Jim Sharples | Jill Greenwood |
| 1995 | Bill Dickie | Ellie Kompch |
| 1996 | Bob Turcotte | Jill Greenwood |
| 1997 | Bob Turcotte | Jill Greenwood |
| 1998 | Jim Sharples | Jill Greenwood |
| 1999 | Jim Sharples | Pat Reid |
| 2000 | Bob Turcotte | Diane Harris |
| 2001 | Axel Larsen | Anne Dunn |
| 2002 | Bob Fedosa | Anne Dunn |
| 2003 | Don Glinz | Joyce Potter |
| 2004 | Bob Turcotte | Anne Dunn |
| 2005 | Frank Gowan | Joyce Potter |
| 2006 | Bruce Delaney | Anne Dunn |
| 2007 | Bob Turcotte | Jan Carwardine |
| 2008 | Bruce Delaney | Ann Pearson |
| 2009 | Bruce Delaney | Cheryl McBain |
| 2010 | Gareth Parry | Dale Curtis |
| 2011 | Guy Racette | Joyce Potter |
| 2012 | Brian Lewis | Nancy Harrison |
| 2013 | Howard Rajala | Judy Oryniak |
| 2014 | Peter Mellor | Marilyn Bodogh |
| 2015 | Jeff McCrady | Kathy Brown |
| 2016 | Bryan Cochrane | Jo-Ann Rizzo |
| 2017 | Howard Rajala | Jo-Ann Rizzo |
| 2018 | Bryan Cochrane | Colleen Madonia |
| 2019 | Bryan Cochrane | Sherry Middaugh |
| 2020 | Howard Rajala | Sherry Middaugh |
| 2021 | Bryan Cochrane | Sherry Middaugh |
| 2022 | Howard Rajala | Jo-Ann Rizzo |
| 2023 | Bryan Cochrane | Susan Froud |
| 2024 | Howard Rajala | Jo-Ann Rizzo |
| 2025 | Mike Harris | Sherry Middaugh |
| 2026 | Bryan Cochrane | Sherry Middaugh |

=== U18 (formerly Bantams) ===
This event is for curlers 17 and under.

=== Best Western Intermediates ===
The Ontario Intermediate Championship was for curlers over 40 (men's) and 35 (women's). It was discontinued after 2018.

Champion skips (1993–2018):

| Year | Men's | Women's |
|---|---|---|
| 1993 | Bob Turcotte | Pat Reid |
| 1994 | Bob Gurd | Gloria Campbell |
| 1995 | Bob Hanna | Anne Dunn |
| 1996 | Don Glinz | Jill Greenwood |
| 1997 | Gary Smith | Gloria Campbell |
| 1998 | Layne Noble | Anne Dunn |
| 1999 | Bob Ingram | Joyce Potter |
| 2000 | Jim Lyle | Gloria Campbell |
| 2001 | John Collins | Joyce Potter |
| 2002 | Jim Lyle | Stacey Brandwood |
| 2003 | Jim Lyle | Suzanne Boudreault |
| 2004 | Jim Lyle | Stacey Brandwood |
| 2005 | Greg Timbers | Kerry Lackie |
| 2006 | Bill Duck | Stacey Brandwood |
| 2007 | J. P. Lachance | Carol Jackson |
| 2008 | Rick Thurston | Stacey Brandwood |
| 2009 | Guy Racette | Carol Jackson |
| 2010 | Al Hutchinson | Carol Jackson |
| 2011 | Ian Robertson | Cheryl McBain |
| 2012 | Bob Armstrong | Karen Shepley O'Hearn |
| 2013 | Al Hutchinson | Ann Pearson |
| 2014 | John Young, Jr. | Beth Gregg |
| 2015 | Cory Heggestad | Cheryl McBain |
| 2016 | Dave Collyer | Karri-Lee Grant |
| 2017 | Spencer Cooper | Mary Pidgeon |
| 2018 | Greg Balsdon | Susan Froud |

=== Masters ===
The Ontario Masters Championship is for curlers over 60. The winner represents Ontario at the Canadian Masters Curling Championships.

(winners since 1993)

| Year | Men's | Women's |
|---|---|---|
| 1993 | Earle Hushagen (Peterborough) | Elizabeth Love (Burlington) |
| 1994 | Earle Hushagen (Peterborough) | Mae Midgley (Simcoe) |
| 1995 | Ken Scovell (Orangeville) | Betty MacMillan (Westmount) |
| 1996 | Joe Moroz (Highland) | Dorrie Fiegehen (Elmvale) |
| 1997 | Rod Matheson (Ottawa) | Mary Lou Dickinson (London) |
| 1998 | Barry Goring (Bayview) | Merle Williams (Avonlea) |
| 1999 | Bill Bennett (Bradford) | Rae Donovan (Navy) |
| 2000 | Jim Sharples (Royals) | Ann De Ryk (Aylmer) |
| 2001 | Bill Dickie (Cornwall) | Nancy B. Clark (Dixie) |
| 2002 | Bill Dickie (Cornwall) | Fran Allan (Unionville) |
| 2003 | Jim Sharples (Royals) | Gloria Sorley (Niagara Falls) |
| 2004 | Bob Edmondson (Oakville) | Wendy Simpson (Kitchener-Waterloo Granite) |
| 2005 | Rod Matheson (Ottawa) | Gloria Sorley (Niagara Falls) |
| 2006 | David Stewart (Oakville) | Betty Bush (Royal Kingston) |
| 2007 | Bob Edmondson (Oakville) | Cathy Keys (Glanford) |
| 2008 | Bob Edmondson (Oakville) | Pam Bothwell (Guelph) |
| 2009 | Bob Edmondson (Oakville) | Betty Bush (Royal Kingston) |
| 2010 | Mike Dorey (Guelph) | Jane Galloway (Ilderton) |
| 2011 | Layne Noble (Ottawa) | Joyce Potter (Rideau) |
| 2012 | Mike Dorey (Guelph) | Joyce Potter (Rideau) |
| 2013 | Bob Turcotte (Scarboro) | Joyce Potter (Rideau) |
| 2014 | Layne Noble (Rideau) | Diana Favel (Rideau) |
| 2015 | Wayne Gowan (Dundas Granite) | Diana Favel (Rideau) |
| 2016 | Bruce Delaney (Russell) | Anne Dunn (Galt) |
| 2017 | Bruce Delaney (Russell) | Dale Curtis (Galt) |
| 2018 | Al Hutchinson (Paisley) | Dale Curtis (Galt) |
| 2019 | Gordon Norton (Oshawa) | Janice Carwardine (Leaside) |
| 2020 | Al Hutchinson (Bluewater) | Janice Carwardine (Leaside) |
| 2021 | Al Hutchinson (Bluewater) | Janice Carwardine (Leaside) |
| 2022 | Al Hutchinson (Bluewater) | Janice Carwardine (Leaside) |
| 2023 | Brian Lewis (Rideau) | Ruth Alexander (Highland) |
| 2024 | Howard Rajala (Rideau) | Alison Goring (Gravenhurst) |
| 2025 | Brian Lewis (Rideau) | Cheryl McPherson (Thornhill) |

=== Mixed Doubles Challenge ===
First instituted in 2013 to send a team to the inaugural National Mixed Doubles Championship.

| Year | Pair | Club |
|---|---|---|
| 2013 | Jaclyn Rivington & Scott McDonald | Highland Country Club, London |
| 2014 | Chris Jay & Shannon Kee | Highland Country Club, London |
| 2015 | Brad Kidd & Casey Kidd | Peterborough Curling Club, Peterborough |
| 2016 | Mike Anderson & Danielle Inglis | Donalda Curling Club, Toronto |
| 2017 | Tyler Stewart & Nicole Westlund Stewart | Kitchener-Waterloo Granite Club, Waterloo |
| 2018 | Wayne Tuck Jr. & Kimberly Tuck | Ilderton Curling Club, Ilderton |
| 2019 | Shawn Cottrill & Katie Cottrill | Wingham Golf & Curling Club, Wingham |
| 2020 | Lauren Wasylkiw & Shane Konings | Unionville Curling Club, Markham |
| 2023 | Lynn Kreviazuk & David Mathers | Ottawa Curling Club, Ottawa |
| 2024 | Lynn Kreviazuk & David Mathers | Ottawa Curling Club, Ottawa |
| 2025 | Katie Ford & Oliver Campbell | KW Granite Club, Waterloo |
| 2026 | Kira Brunton & Jacob Horgan | Ottawa Hunt and Golf Club, Ottawa |

=== Gore Mutual Schoolboy/girl ===
This event is the provincial school championship, and teams represent their secondary schools rather than clubs. The boys event has been held annually since 1948.

- 2019 schoolgirl champion: A. N. Myer Secondary School (Megan Ford)
- 2019 schoolboy champion: Fellowes High School (Cole Lyon)

Notable past champions

- Scott McDonald, St. Thomas Aquinas Catholic Secondary School (2004)
- Tim March, Sir Oliver Mowat CI (2005)
- Patrick Janssen, Sir Oliver Mowat CI (2005)
- Mark Bice, Northern Collegiate Institute and Vocational School (2002)
- Steve Bice, Northern Collegiate Institute and Vocational School (2000)
- Jason Young, Lambton C.V.I. (1998)
- Greg Balsdon, Don Mills Collegiate Institute (1995)
- Dale Matchett, Bradford District High School (1994)
- Pat Ferris, Sutton District High School (1993)
- Joe Frans, Smiths Falls District Collegiate Institute (1991)
- Scott Patterson, Fellowes High School (1987)
- Daryl Shane, John Diefenbaker Secondary School (1978)
- Paul Savage, Don Mills Collegiate Institute (1965)

=== Wheelchair Championship ===
This is a mixed event, featuring wheelchair curling.

Champions:

- 2026: Karl Allen, King C.C.
- 2025: Shauna Petrie, Toronto Cricket
- 2024: Doug Morris, King C.C.
- 2023: Jon Thurston, King C.C.
- 2022: Not held
- 2020: Cancelled
- 2019: Jim Armstrong, City View C.C.
- 2018: Chris Rees, Toronto Cricket
- 2017: Mike Munro, Ilderton C.C.
- 2016: Chris Rees, Toronto Cricket
- 2015: Chris Rees, Peterborough C.C.
- 2014: Mike Munro, Ilderton C.C.
- 2013: Ken Gregory, Bradford & District C.C.
- 2012: Mark Ideson, Ilderton C.C.
- 2011: Chris Rees, Toronto Cricket
- 2010: Bruce Cameron, RA Centre
- 2009: Ken Gregory, Bradford & District C.C.
- 2008: Chris Rees, Leaside C.C.
- 2007: Chris Rees, Leaside C.C.
- 2006: Chris Rees, Leaside C.C.
- 2005: Ken Gregory, Toronto Cricket

Wheelchair doubles.

Introduced in 2023. Champions are as follows:

- 2025: Jon Thurston & Chrissy Molnar, Bobcaygeon C.C.
- 2024: Chris Rees & Ken Gregory, King C.C.
- 2023: Alec Denys & Carl Bax, Peterborough C.C.

=== Challenge ===
This event allowed more amateur curlers to win a provincial championship. Only two members of a team were allowed to have won a zone crest in any other event except for youth events. In addition, only two members of the team could have won the provincial event before. All zone winners went straight to a 32 team provincial championship. This event ran from 1990 to 2018.

Notable winners:

- 2005 women's: Cathy Auld (St. George's Golf and Country Club)

=== Colts/Trophy ===
This event has historically disqualified the top teams in the province. In its final year, 2018, the winners qualified for the Ontario Tankard (men's) and the Ontario Scotties Tournament of Hearts (women's).

Notable past winners:

- Sebastien Robillard (2018)
- Chrissy Cadorin (2018)
- Alison Goring (2014)
- Mark Kean (2010)
- Kimberly Tuck (2005)
- Jon St. Denis (2004)
- Chad Allen (2002)
- Brent Ross (1997)
- Adam Spencer (1994)
- Nick Rizzo (1988)
- Paul Savage (1968)

=== Junior Mixed ===
This event existed until 2016 and was replaced by the U21 Mixed Doubles championship. Competitors must be 20 years or younger as of December 31 of the previous year.

Past winners:

| Year | Winning team |
|---|---|
| 1983 | Rob Brandwood |
| 1984 | Mike Attenhof |
| 1985 | Dave Simpson |
| 1986 | Wayne Middaugh |
| 1987 | Peter Corner, Susan Shepley, Drew Macklin, Karen Shepley |
| 1988 | Peter Corner, Susan Shepley, Drew Macklin, Karen Shepley |
| 1989 | Richard Hart, Janet McGhee, Collin Mitchell, Tracy Jackson |
| 1990 | Matt Hames, Jayne Flinn, Chris Harris, Leslie Allan |
| 1991 | Joe Frans, Kerri McGrath, Daniel Frans, Stacey Rayner |
| 1992 | Brad Savage, Julie Anderson, Gord Chilton, Sandy Graham |
| 1993 | Warren Fisher, Katharine Pilon, Paul Winford, Jo-Anne McArthur |
| 1994 | Tony Rowlandson, Kate McKellar, Sean Follis, Kim Shortt |
| 1995 | Steve Allen, Tammy Wall, Rick Allen, Monique Robert |
| 1996 | Greg Balsdon, Danielle St. Amand, Chris Wall, Becky Philpot |
| 1997 | Raymond Busato, Susan Hughes, Mike Lilly, Lynn Ritchie |
| 1998 | Jason Young, Denna Schell, Spencer Cooper, Amy Cooper |
| 1999 | John Morris, Jacqueline Smith, Brent Laing, Chrissy Cadorin |
| 2000 | John Epping, Julie Reddick, Jason Newland, Stephanie Leachman |
| 2001 | Sean St. Amand, Chrissy Cadorin, Dale Roach, Amy MacKay |
| 2002 | Sebastien Robillard, Julie Reddick, Kevin Flewwelling, Leigh Armstrong |
| 2003 | Chris Gardner, Lauren Mann, Gavan Jamieson, Jaimee Gardner |
| 2004 | Lee Merklinger, Peter Gillich, Breanne Merklinger, Brian Fleischhaker |
| 2005 | Marika Bakewell, Jodie Hodgson, Stephanie Carrodo, Bill Francis |
| 2006 | Mike Anderson, Laura Payne, Darren Anderson, Megan Aldridge |
| 2007 | Scott McDonald, Brit O'Neill, Andrew Clayton, Jenn Minchin |
| 2008 | Christian Tolusso, Emma Miskew, Ritchie Gillan, Stephanie Piper |
| 2009 | Mark Kean, Jaclyn Rivington, Andrew Inouye, Darrelle Johnson |
| 2010 | Andrew McGaugh, Ginger Coyle, Michael McGaugh, Frances Pritchard |
| 2011 | Robert Collins, Kaitlin Stubbs, Isaac Stubbs, Alanna Cornish |
| 2012 | Brett Lyon-Hatcher, Evie Fortier, Ben Miskew, Sydney Chasty |
| 2013 | Michael McGaugh, Kendall Haymes, Bryan Mitchell, Cassie Savage |
| 2014 | Ryan McCrady, Lauren Horton, Matthew Haughn, Jessica Armstrong |
| 2015 | Pascal Michaud, Kaitlin Jewer, Decebal Michaud, Emma Becker |
| 2016 | Pascal Michaud, Kaitlin Jewer, Decebal Michaud, Mariah Jacklin |

==== U21 Mixed Doubles ====
| Year | Winning pair | Club |
|---|---|---|
| 2017 | Morgan Calwell & Kayla MacMillan | Quinte |
| 2018 | Matt Hall & Riley Sandham | Kitchener-Waterloo Granite |
| 2019 | Sammy Churchill & Anastasia Richards | St. Catharines Golf & Country Club |

=== U18 Mixed ===
Previously known as Bantam Mixed

- 2019 champions: Jordan McNamara, Alyssa Blad, Maxime Daigle, Laura Smith

Notable past winners:

- 2013: Jeff Wanless, Jestyn Murphy, Hale Murphy, Leah Will
- 2012: Sarah Nuhn, John Willsey, Hilary Nuhn, Jean-Michel Barrette
- 2011: Jason Camm
- 2010: Tyler Sagan, Carly Howard, Jason Camm, Joan Moore
- 2009: Richard Krell
- 2008: Lynn Kreviazuk
- 2003: Rob Bushfield, Rachel Homan, Alex Coon, Alison Kreviazuk
- 2002: Chris Gardner
- 1998: Bobby Reid, Megan Balsdon, Mark Stanfield, Kelly Cochrane

=== Senior Mixed ===
Mixed curling for male curlers over 50 and female curlers over 45.

Notable past champions:

- 2017: Rob Lobel
- 2013, 2015 & 2022: Rick Thurston
- 2024: Adam Spencer
- 2025: Howard Rajala

=== Silver Tankard ===
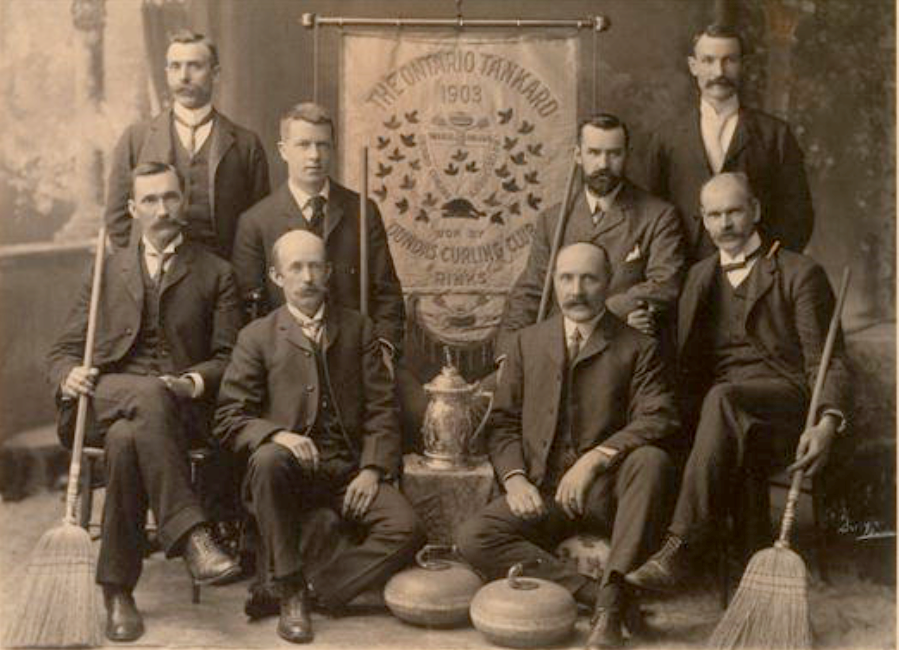
Charles Collins and his team from the Dundas Curling Club, were winners of this event in 1903

In this event, each club that enters has two teams, who compete against other clubs, and scores are totalled in aggregate form. Regional and zone playdowns are single-knock out rather than double. It is the oldest of the O.C.A. events, dating back to 1875. The women's event has been held since 1914.

The event served as a provincial championship from 1927 to 1931 with a team selected from with winning club representing Ontario at the Brier. In 1932 and 1933, the winner entered a playoff to go to the Brier, and from 1934 to 1937, the winner of the Brier trophy event of the Tankard went to the Brier.

In 2022, the event format changed, with the men's and women's events being merged into one. The event is still a double rink event, except one team must be a men's team, and the other a women's team.

Champion clubs since 1951:

| Year | Men's | Women's |
|---|---|---|
| 1951 | Oshawa | Toronto Granite |
| 1952 | Kingston | Toronto Granite |
| 1953 | Kingston CC | Toronto Granite |
| 1954 | London CC | Toronto Granite |
| 1955 | Peterborough CC | Toronto Ladies CC |
| 1956 | Orillia CC | Brant CC |
| 1957 | Sarnia CC | Kitchener-Waterloo Granite |
| 1958 | Unionville CC | Scarboro G&CC |
| 1959 | Unionville CC | Oshawa CC |
| 1960 | Toronto Granite | Oshawa CC |
| 1961 | Toronto Granite | Sarnia Ladies CC |
| 1962 | Unionville | Sarnia Ladies CC |
| 1963 | Woodstock CC | Royal Canadian CC |
| 1964 | Parkway | Sarnia G&CC |
| 1965 | Parkway | Galt CC |
| 1966 | Unionville CC | Scarboro |
| 1967 | Trenton RCAF CC | Thornhill CC |
| 1968 | Kingston CC | Oakville CC |
| 1969 | Trenton CFB | St. Thomas CC |
| 1970 | Niagara Falls CC | Tam Heather CC |
| 1971 | Brampton CC | Brampton CC |
| 1972 | London | Kingston CC |
| 1973 | St. Thomas CC | Guelph CC |
| 1974 | Leaside CC | Humber Highland CC |
| 1975 | St. Thomas CC | Avonlea CC |
| 1976 | RCN (Navy) CC | Thornhill CC |
| 1977 | RCN (Navy) CC | Midland CC |
| 1978 | Annandale CC | Tam Heather CC |
| 1979 | Boulevard | St. Thomas CC |
| 1980 | RCN (Navy) CC | Guelph CC |
| 1981 | Annandale CC | Humber Highland CC |
| 1982 | Royal Canadian CC | Royal Canadian CC |
| 1983 | Carleton Place CC | Oshawa CC |
| 1984 | Hylands CC | Burlington G&CC |
| 1985 | Oshawa CC | North Halton G&CC |
| 1986 | RCN (Navy) CC | Boulevard |
| 1987 | RCN (Navy) CC | Boulevard |
| 1988 | Rideau CC | Sarnia G&CC |
| 1989 | Guelph CC | Dundas Granite CC |
| 1990 | Guelph CC | ? |
| 1991 | Barrie CC | Sarnia |
| 1992 | St. Thomas CC | Burlington CC |
| 1993 | Ottawa CC | Avonlea CC |
| 1994 | Beach Grove G&CC | Sarnia G&CC |
| 1995 | Guelph CC | Burlington CC |
| 1996 | Chesley CC | St. Thomas CC |
| 1997 | Ilderton CC | Listowel CC |
| 1998 | Rideau CC | Burlington CC |
| 1999 | Brant CC | Burlington CC |
| 2000 | Richmond Hill CC | Boulevard |
| 2001 | Forest CC | Ayr CC |
| 2002 | Orangeville CC | Ottawa CC |
| 2003 | Metcalfe CC | Ilderton CC |
| 2004 | Annandale CC | Ilderton CC |
| 2005 | Annandale CC | Ilderton CC |
| 2006 | Milton CC | Orangeville CC |
| 2007 | Metcalfe CC | Bayview G&CC |
| 2008 | St. George's G&CC | Ilderton CC |
| 2009 | Milton CC | Orangeville CC |
| 2010 | Renfrew CC | Glendale G&CC |
| 2011 | Brockville CC | Uxbridge & District CC |
| 2012 | Guelph CC | Bayview G&CC |
| 2013 | Rideau CC | Ilderton CC |
| 2014 | Ottawa CC | Uxbridge & District CC |
| 2015 | Chatham Granite | Ilderton CC |
| 2016 | Royal Canadian CC | St. Mary's CC |
| 2017 | Brantford G&CC | Bayview G&CC |
| 2018 | Cataraqui G&CC | Oshawa CC |
| 2019 | KW Granite | Guelph CC |
| 2020 | Cancelled | |
| 2021 | Cancelled | |
| 2022 | St. Thomas CC | |
| 2023 | St. Thomas CC | |
| 2024 | Dundas Valley G&CC | |
| 2025 | Tillsonburg CC | |
| 2026 | Dundas Valley G&CC | |

=== Curling Club Championship ===
Champions

| Year | Men's club (skip) | Women's club (skip) |
|---|---|---|
| 2009 | Chatham Granite (Robert Stafford) | High Park (Kelly Cochrane) |
| 2010 | Annandale CC (Chris Van Huyse) | Chinguacousy CC (Susan Burnside) |
| 2011 | Richmond Hill CC (Greg Balsdon) | High Park (Jodi McCutcheon) |
| 2012 | Richmond Hill CC (Jordan Keon) | Quinte CC (Caroline Deans) |
| 2013 | KW Granite (Brent Gray) | Burlington CC (Michelle Fletcher) |
| 2014 | Cataraqui G&CC (Mike Hull) | Westmount G&CC (Kerry Lackie) |
| 2015 | Palmerston CC (Mike Benjamins) | Guelph CC (Tina Mazerolle) |
| 2016 | Cataraqui G&CC (Wesley Forget) | Lindsay CC (Julie O'Neill) |
| 2017 | Richmond Hill CC (Jon St. Denis) | High Park (Jodi McCutcheon) |
| 2018 | Cornwall CC (Matthew Dupuis) | Oshawa CC (Stacey Hogan) |
| 2019 | KW Granite (Paul Moffatt) | York CC (Laurie Shields) |
| 2021 | Guelph CC (Adam Spencer) | York CC (Laurie Shields) |
| 2022 | Richmond Hill CC (Greg Balsdon) | The Thornhill (Chrissy Cadorin) |
| 2023 | Royal Kingston CC (Noel Herron) | Rideau CC (Lindsay Thorne) |
| 2024 | Richmond Hill CC (Jordan Keon) | Dixie CC (Patricia Bandurka) |
| 2025 | Russell CC (Bryan Cochrane) | Rideau CC (Lindsay Thorne) |
| 2026 | High Park (Mike McCutcheon) | Alliston CC (Susan Froud) |

=== Grandmasters ===
This event is for curlers over the age of 70. The event is an open event, that women and men may enter. It began in 2007.

Winners:

- 2007: Peter Barker
- 2008: Al Boyle
- 2009: Garry Holmes
- 2010: Peter Barker
- 2011: Austin Palmer
- 2012: Rod Matheson
- 2013: Art Leganchuk
- 2014: Bob Edmondson
- 2015: Benny Brock
- 2016: Ron Perrier
- 2017: Gerard Gidding
- 2018: Bob Edmondson
- 2019: Don Moseley-Williams
- 2020–22: Cancelled due to the COVID-19 pandemic
- 2023: Ted Hellyer
- 2024: Willie Beaton
- 2025: Al Hutchinson
- 2026: Willie Beaton

=== Provincial Stick Bonspiel ===
In this event, curlers must use a "stick" to throw the rock. "Sticks" are usually used by disabled and elderly athletes unable to throw the rock by sliding along the ice. The event began in 2007.

Winners:

- 2007: Del Hicke
- 2008: Harold Peltzer
- 2009: Harold Peltzer
- 2010: Ed Ferguson
- 2011: Bruce Jeffrey
- 2012: Bruce Jeffrey
- 2013: Carl Glatt
- 2014: Carl Glatt
- 2015: Bruce Jeffrey
- 2016: Hugh Chesser
- 2017: Bruce Folkard
- 2019: Bruce Gillespie
- 2020: cancelled
- 2022: Rick Thurston
- 2023: Morris Anderson
- 2024: Morris Anderson
- 2025: Rick Thurston
- 2026: Morris Anderson

Two-person (men)

- 2019: Ron Scheckenberger/Ken Mattis
- 2020: Ron Scheckenberger/Ken Mattis
- 2022: Jim Armstrong/Ian Gray
- 2023: Morris Anderson/Wayne Shea
- 2024: Ron Scheckenberger/Rick Thurston
- 2025: Ron Scheckenberger/Rick Thurston
- 2026: Bill Malcolmson/Christopher Malcolmson

Two-person (women)

- 2025: Nancy Sheppard/Caroline Watt
- 2026: Beth Carter/Sandy Gardiner

Two-person (mixed)

- 2026: Don Sheppard/Nancy Sheppard

=== Elementary School Championship ===
This event is open to elementary school students of any gender. Teams represent their elementary schools. The event began in 1993.

Past winners:

- Tanner Horgan, MacLeod Public School (2012)

=== Trillium Club Championship ===
This event began in 2023 and features teams who participate in local and provincial bonspiels. Teams earn points from these tournaments and are invited to play in this event.

Winners:

| Year | Men's | Women's |
|---|---|---|
| 2023 | Mark Patterson (Golden Acres) | Patricia Bandurka (Dixie) |
| 2024 | John Bolton (Lindsay) | Laurie Shields (York) |

=== Best Western Challenge ===
This is a new event which began in 2025, and features two tiers; a "Tier 1" event where only two players per team can have played on a team that has made the playoffs in a provincial championship that leads to a national championship (excluding the Club Championships) within the previous three years, and a "Tier 2" event, where none of the teams can have players that have participated in a Provincial Championship leading to a national championship.

Winners:

| Year | Men's Tier 1 | Women's Tier 1 | Men's Tier 2 | Women's Tier 2 |
|---|---|---|---|---|
| 2025 | Samuel Steep (KW Granite) | Kelly Cochrane (High Park) | Mathew Coady (Wiarton) | Lisa McClean Stellick (Toronto Cricket) |
| 2026 | Christopher Krasowski (South Muskoka) | Laurie Shields (York) | Corey St-Laurent (Royal Kingston) | Susan Baird (Dixie) |

=== Ontario Parasport Games ===
Winners:

- 2006: Bruce Cameron (RA Centre)
- 2008: Chris Daw (Bradford)
- 2010: Ken Gregory (Bradford)
- 2012: Ken Gregory (Bradford)

=== Ontario Winter Games ===
Winners:

Men's

- 2002: Mike Anderson (Bayview)
- 2004: Shane Latimer (Winchester)
- 2006: Neil Sinclair (Manotick)
- 2008: Richard Krell (St. Thomas)
- 2010: Ben Bevan (Annandale)
- 2012: Doug Kee (Sarnia)
- 2014: Matthew Hall (Stroud)
- 2016: Cancelled
- 2018: Josh Leung (Whitby)
- 2020: Dylan Niepage (Coldwater)
- 2024: Evan MacDougall
- 2026: Owen MacTavish

Women's

- 2002: Laura Payne (Prescott)
- 2004: Hollie Nicol (Bayview)
- 2006: Rachel Homan (City View)
- 2008: Crystal Lillico (Winchester)
- 2010: Lauren Horton (Huntley)
- 2012: Krysta Burns (Idylwylde)
- 2014: Megan Smith (Sudbury)
- 2016: Cancelled
- 2018: Rachel Steele (Port Perry)
- 2020: Emily Deschenes (Manotick)
- 2024: Dominique Vivier
- 2026: Charlotte Wilson (Rideau CC)

Wheelchair

- 2012: Chris Rees (Toronto Cricket)
- 2014: Chris Rees (Peterborough)
- 2018: ?
- 2020: Carl Bax
- 2026: Team Allen

Mixed doubles

- 2018: Kira Brunton & Jacob Horgan (Sudbury)
- 2020: Mychelle Zahab & Sam Mooibroek
- 2026: Emma Penston & Justin Anderson

=== Governor General's ===
This was a double rink event dating back to the 1890s that was cancelled in 1997. From 1994 to 1997 it was a mixed event. Prior to that it was a men's event.

The winning cup was usually presented by the Governor General of Canada.

The event is not to be confused with the Governor General's Trophy, a separate double-rink curling tournament organized by the Canadian Branch and has been held since 1875, and open to teams in Eastern Ontario and Quebec.

Winners (1972–1997)
(Notable players in parentheses)

- 1972: Oshawa
- 1973: Welland Curling Club
- 1974: Sun Parlour Curling Club
- 1975: Dundas Valley Golf and Curling Club
- 1976: Orillia
- 1977: Lansdowne Curling Club
- 1978: Ottawa Hylands
- 1979: Dundas Valley
- 1980: Burlington Golf and Country Club
- 1981: Ottawa Curling
- 1982: Chinguacousy Curling Club
- 1983: Peterborough G & C.C.
- 1984: Chesley Curling Club
- 1985: Midland C.C. (Russ Howard)
- 1986: Avonlea C.C.
- 1987: Simcoe C.C.
- 1988: K-W Granite Club
- 1989: Thornhill
- 1990: York Curling Club
- 1991: Guelph Curling Club
- 1992: Richmond Curling Club
- 1993: Milton Curling Club
- 1994: RCN (Navy) Curling Club (Howard Rajala)
- 1995: Rideau Curling Club (Rich Moffatt)
- 1996: Tam Heather Country Club (Mike Harris)
- 1997: Glendale Golf and Country Club

== See also ==
- List of curling clubs in Ontario
- Northern Ontario Curling Association
- Ottawa Valley Curling Association
- Toronto Curling Association

== Sources ==
- Soudog's Curling History Site
- Curlingzone.com
- Ontario Curling Association
- Canadian Curling Association
