= Shirley Harmer =

Canadian singer and actress (born 1933)

Shirley Harmer (born 25 March 1933) is a Canadian singer and actress who was "one of the top female personalities on Canadian television" in the mid-1950s. She was named the most promising newcomer in Canadian television by the Association of Canadian Radio and Television Artists in 1953. For a time in the 1960s she used the stage name Vida Durinzi.

== Early years ==
Harmer was born in Oshawa, Ontario, Canada, and grew up there. She, her parents, and five siblings lived in a large farmhouse. In addition to working for General Motors, her father was a soloist in a church choir and sang on a radio station in Toronto; her mother played piano. All of her family enjoyed singing, with her two sisters and three brothers particularly enthusiastic about barbershop-style harmony. When she was young, delivering newspapers provided her with a bicycle, which she rode six miles each week to a studio for singing lessons. During World War II she started singing at Red Cross meetings, her first public performances. When she was 14 she began performing with a musical ensemble that one of her brothers had formed. She sang in the choir of the local Methodist church and in local concerts. She attended Oshawa Central Collegiate Institute.

== Career ==
=== 1950s ===
When Harmer was 15 years old, orchestra leader Boyd Valleau obtained her parents' permission for her to sing with his band for $2 per engagement. She performed with that group for about five years, primarily singing for school dances in the Toronto area. She began making guest appearances on radio programs by the time she was 18. By 1951 she was singing on Cal's Club, a Canadian Broadcasting Corporation (CBC) program. Other programs on which she appeared included Glover's Lane, the Johnny Burt Show, and Whispering Strings. In 1951 she became a regular on a program hosted by George Murray, whom she later married. He made tapes of her performances on his home recorder, then took those tapes to New York to play for radio executives there. His efforts resulted in her singing on programs on the American Broadcasting Company's radio network in the United States, including Paul Whiteman's American Music Hall and George Jessel Salutes. In the summer of 1954 she starred in a Hollywood Bowl concert with Whiteman and his orchestra, singing eight songs by George Gershwin before an audience of 20,000 people. She performed at all of Whiteman's major concerts in the mid-1950s. including Gershwin-focused concerts in Pittsburgh, Pennsylvania, and other cities. She sang with Whiteman's orchestra in Carnegie Hall and in Denver, "while 22,000 people sat through an open-air concert in the pouring rain to listen to her". Whiteman cited Harmer and Bing Crosby as "the two greatest vocalists I have ever worked with".

In the early 1950s Harmer made her Toronto TV debut on The Big Revue, and she went on to sing on the CBC's Four for the Show. On American TV she was a regular on The Dave Garroway Show (1953-1954). Achieving that role involved going through a vocal audition, in which she "had to sing in a big empty room and look into the dark control room to an invisible audience of critics" and an on-camera test, in which she was one of six singers selected from dozens who auditioned. She became the regularly featured artist on CBC-TV's CGE Showtime beginning in October 1954. At $750 per week, she had one of the highest salaries at CBC. She was offered a vocalist's position on Don McNeill's Breakfast Club at $1,000 per week, but she preferred the role on CGE Showtime.

In September 1953 Harmer signed a contract with MGM Records. Her first recording was "Embrasse Moi Bien" backed with "We Will Always Be Sweethearts". Unaware of Harmer's limited knowledge of French, the person who assigned those songs said, "Since you come from Canada, you'll have no trouble with the lyrics." Harmer returned to Toronto and consulted with a French-Canadian friend, who provided a phonetic version of the French lyrics. When she went back to the record company, she "impressed people at MGM with her warm voice and flawless French". In 1955 she recorded "Secret Doorway", from the film Rebel Without a Cause, and "Please Hurry Home".

One reviewer said of her second record that Harmer "voices sincerity and warmth" in the ballad "If You Love Me", while the other side, "Won'tcha' Love Me" was "a little too much on the hillbilly" for her style. Another disk, "I'm Playing With Fire" backed with "I Could Make You Care" led a reviewer to write that Harmer was "in glorious voice" with a "mellow and moody" version of the first song, while the second was "a ballad that could be big". Her 1954 recording of "Venezuela" was voted Favorite Canadian Record in a news service's survey of Canadian disc jockeys. A reviewer called her recording of "Secret Doorway" "a stunning vehicle for Shirley's fine voice" and added, "'Please Hurry Home' is a mighty pleasing affair, too".

Harmer's "spirit of adventure" and "vague notions about doing other things" kept her open to opportunities that might arise. During a vacation in Hollywood in 1957 she developed a friendship with an agent who told her about auditions for a female singer on George Gobel's TV program. She was billed as guest vocalist on the September 24, 1957, episode of The George Gobel Show, after which she became a regular on the series for the rest of the 1957-1958 season. Harmer and Murray considered her tryout for the Gobel show to be a gamble. She was initially scheduled only for the first episode, but both of them had quit their Canadian TV jobs hoping that the appearance would result in a longer engagement on the show. Harmer said, "I'd gone as far as I could go in Canada — and we hope I can go farther here." The tryout resulted in a season contract for Harmer. Following her work on the program, NBC offered her a five-year TV contract that would have included her appearing on the summer replacement for Dinah Shore's show.

Harmer spent a full day at Paramount Pictures in 1958 being prepared for a screen test and being tested in scenes from three films. The result was a contract for $500 per week for one year with a seven-year option. She considered signing with the studio a gamble, but she called performing in films "the greatest lure in show business" and added, "A career in motion pictures is what every entertainer dreams of. It comes ahead of everything." After she completed the season on Gobel's program, she became bored waiting to work at Paramount. She said, "I would call the studio and they would always be nice, but still nothing happened." When she asked about taking acting lessons the studio rejected the idea, saying "Stay the way you are." After she appeared in The Hangman (1959), director Michael Curtiz said, "This girl has a great future. She's loaded with talent." She had a dramatic role in the film, with no singing involved, as a cowboy's pregnant wife, which she described as "a very small part". The studio dropped her contract in March 1959, but in May 1959 Paramount had renewed interest in her, giving her a screen test for the role of Daisy Mae in Li'l Abner (1959).

On October 17, 1959, Harmer made her first appearance as a nightclub singer in the Chaudiere Rose Room in Ottawa. She was concerned about adapting to the crowd activity of a nightclub, whether the chatter, laughter, and other sounds would bother her after she had "been pampered by television". She spent three months practicing the act, which was written for her. A reviewer noted the appreciative nature of the audience and added, "She was, in fact, a hit." Her time there ended on October 31, 1959, with the audience having averaged about 1,000 per night. She left to begin a series of appearances in U. S. nightclubs. In addition to a change of venue, performing in nightclubs was accompanied by changes in Harmer. She summed them up: "My hair is no longer blonde; it's torchy red. I now wear curvy dresses, knee-high and low-cut. I sing bouncy tunes with plenty of lift. I don't just stand there, singing — I move!" She said that in contrast to performing on TV, where the main emphasis was on production, the focus on singing in nightclubs had enabled her to "widen my range and material".

=== 1960s ===
Harmer eventually realized that those changes were not right for her. She had performed in Houston, Lake Tahoe, Las Vegas, and Denver before returning to Canada. She said, "I guess when I got home to Canada it sunk in. I bombed in Ottawa. I was simply awful." Reworking her image, "she discarded the brassy role, shed her slinky dresses, stopped wiggling and finger-snapping and worked out a straight stand-up act". She performed in three engagements in Canada but could not overcome a feeling of loneliness. About the time she "was feeling the lowest I've ever felt", she found out that she was pregnant, which she said "was just wonderful". When she resumed performing after the birth of her son in late 1960, she went back to Canadian TV.

Harmer returned to Canadian television on A Summer Night, which debuted on 29 June 1962. The variety series featured musical content and skits related to Canadians' activities in the summer. Within that context, the producer said, "The program will concentrate on providing the best possible setting for Shirley's talent." Nathan Cohen wrote in the Toronto Daily Star that Harmer's work on A Summer Night demonstrated that over the nine years since her TV debut she had "been improving herself as a performer ... without losing those qualities which made her worth noticing in the first place". His column said:

These qualities are a buoyant naturalness (every time an attempt is made to turn her into a chanteuse or sexy type singer, one is embarrassed, not necessarily because she can't do it, but because it's so wrong for her to be that type), a luminous sweetness of expression centered around her eyes, a purity of being which informs us that her songs of love and the joys of love and the pleasure of wanting and béing wanted are as clear and unspoiled in feeling as spring water, for this is a specific emotion that no amount of experience can alter or corrode.

In those early days, he wrote, "she was a small-town girl, whose very innocence as a human being was refreshing". After years of working in cities, he added, her "true spirit" remained unaffected.

In the fall of 1962, Harmer returned to Canadian radio with a 15-minute program, singing on the The Shirley Harmer Show on Tuesday and Thursday afternoons on CBC. In 1962-1963, she was on the Wayne and Shuster Hour and was a guest on Parade, both on CBC-TV. She continued to make personal appearances, singing in large hotels in Montreal and Toronto, and in May 1962, she was on a two-week tour entertaining United Nations troops on the Gaza Strip. Harmer's return to Canadian media was accompanied by a return to popularity. In June 1963, The Star Weekly newspaper in Toronto had a three-page feature article about her with the headline "Back on Top Again". In it, Don Hudson, producer of the Wayne and Shuster Hour called Harmer "a charming artist ... the most popular girl singer Canada has ever had". In 1963 she recorded "The Verdict Is Guilty" backed with "No Greater Love Than Mine" on the Chateau label.

In 1965 Harmer went back to the United States. Describing herself as "a homebody", she said, "I don't like the nightclub circuit." She moved with then-husband Allan Bertram to Dobbs Ferry, New York, as the couple's focus shifted from her career to his. While he was writing scripts for the TV shows Hullabaloo and Class of '66, she had the lead female role in the drama Point of Impact, an episode of Show of the Week on CBC-TV. She portrayed a singer, and for the episode's one song she lip synched one of her own records. She continued her musical activities by appearing on two episodes of Sunday Showcase on CBC Radio and on Johnny Carson's TV show in the United States, and by joining George Gobel for an engagement in Detroit.

What was originally a one-week stay at the supper club in Caesar's Palace in Montreal in November 1966 was extended as a result of the way Harmer "charmed the ringsiders of the luxurious spot". By February 1967 she had become engaged to Damiano Durinzi, a partner in the operation of Caesar's. The engagement was announced by a journalist in his column in The (Montreal) Gazette. In April 1967 she appeared in London in a Command Performance for the Queen. Harmer and Durinzi lived in Italy, and she entered a new phase of her career. With little publicity she began singing songs that set the mood at the beginning of Italian films. She took the professional name Vida Durinzi, using her husband's last name and a first name chosen by her recording company, Miura Records of Milan (of which her husband was a director). She also performed concerts across Italy, filling stadiums in villages. She had offers for roles in Italian films but rejected them because they included nude scenes. Her additional work in Europe included appearing on television and in nightclubs and touring with Josephine Baker.

=== 1970s ===
Following her time in Italy, Harmer returned to Canada and resumed performing in nightclubs using her original name. Her performance at the Skyline's Top of the Hill in Ottawa in June 1971 elicited contrasting opinions in reviews in two Ottawa newspapers. Dave Brown wrote in the The Ottawa Journal, "She never looked better. She never sounded better." He indicated that her wig, costume, and her style on stage made her more appealing than "the just-plain-girl" who was on TV a decade earlier. Meanwhile, Gordon Stoneham wrote in The Ottawa Citizen that Harmer's act was "something of a shambles ... far too loosely structured ... and the choice of material is generally uninspired". Stoneham said that the part of the act that featured Gershwin songs was the only segment in which "Miss Harmer's talents were fully realized". He complimented her interpretation, phrasing, and projection in the Gershwin selections.

A review in The (Montreal) Gazette said that Harmer's performance at the Playboy Club in 1972 demonstrated her transformation "from a rather bloodless CBC 'star' into a club singer of considerable belt". The review complimented Harmer's handling of a variety of styles of music in English, French, and Italian. It added that her act was "the kind of cabaret singing that will never really die so long as there are bars, booze, and the kind of people who like to sit in for a few songs and let themselves get turned on".

In late 1972 or early 1973 she returned to the Thornton's Corners area of Oshawa with her son, spending much time at her parents' home and reuniting with women who were her girlfriends when they were teenagers. In May 1974 she began a four-month engagement singing in the Cafe of the Redwoods in the Four Seasons Sheraton Hotel in Toronto. A review of her opening performance in The Globe and Mail called her "a pleasant but quite ordinary girl singer ... trying to make what she can of the name that was established when stardom struck her by accident." The review complimented her performances with ballads but said, "In livelier numbers she was nimble, glib, but not in the least exciting, convincing or remarkable". Additionally, the review noted that the room's acoustics worked against Harmer by magnifying the ambient noise and chatter.

By 1977 Harmer had returned to the United States. Settled in Florida, she said, "But for the first time in years, I feel as if I have a real home, a place where I belong, so I don't feel as if I'm living out of a trunk any more." Her full-time singing career included performing in Florida and doing concerts with Louis Nye in southern states. She and Nye alternated segments in their concerts at dinner theaters and other venues. In 1978 she was "alternating residences in New York and Tampa Bay, still holding onto her Canadian citizenship".

=== 1980s ===
By 1980 Harmer was living in Los Angeles and performing on ocean cruises and in nightclubs. Her sister said, "Shirley gets standing ovations almost everywhere she performs and has won international awards for her singing, but for some reason they ignore her in Ontario. It hurts."

== Personal life ==
In October 1954, Harmer married George Murray, who had become her manager after she performed on his radio program. They had separated by May 1959 and she obtained a divorce in Tijuana, Mexico. She married actor Allan Bertram in Mexico in August 1959 but initially kept the marriage a secret. They had a son. She was reported to have married civil engineer Damiano Durinzi in 1967, but in 1974 she said, "Damiano and I were never legally married." They lived together for five years, and when they split in 1972, she said, "It was like being divorced." She said that the separation occurred because he wanted to dominate her, while "I wanted to be my own person." In February 1982 Harmer married comedian Beni Masselli (whose stage name was Beni Mason), whom she had met when they were cruise-ship entertainers.

== Recognition ==
In 1953 the Association of Canadian Radio and Television Artists named Harmer the most promising newcomer in Canadian television. In 1956 the Canadian branch of the United Press wire service named Harmer the top female television personality.
