= 2014 Travelers Curling Club Championship =

Canadian national curling championship edition

- Host city: Halifax, Nova Scotia
- Arena: Mayflower Curling Club
- Dates: November 24–29
- Men's winner: Saskatchewan
- Curling club: Nutana CC, Saskatoon
- Skip: Kory Kohuch
- Third: Mark Adams
- Second: Wes Lang
- Lead: David Schmirler
- Finalist: Ontario
- Women's winner: Ontario
- Curling club: Westmount G&CC, Kitchener
- Skip: Kerry Lackie
- Third: Lisa McLean
- Second: Halyna Tepylo
- Lead: Cynthia Roth
- Finalist: Prince Edward Island

The 2014 Travelers Curling Club Championship was held from November 24 to 29 at the Mayflower Curling Club in Halifax, Nova Scotia.

== Men ==
=== Teams ===
The teams are listed as follows:

Province	Skip	Third	Second	Lead	Locale
Alberta	Dan Sherrard	Brandon Klassen	Kyle Reynolds	Cody Brown	Jasper Place CC, Edmonton
British Columbia	Darren Frycz	Steve Claxton	Don Monk	Bill Nickerson	Langley CC, Langley
Manitoba	Kerry Fedorchuk	Vince Van Dorp	Bob Fryza	Ian Grieve	Petersfield CC, Petersfield
New Brunswick	Mike Flannery	Tyler Milson	Steve Muzzerall	Michael Flannery	Capital WC, Fredericton
Newfoundland and Labrador	Rod Feltham	Kris Macleod	Steve Humphries	Alex Silmarie	Gander CC, Gander
Northern Ontario	Dave Barker	Brian Aaltonen	Ron Melhuish	Kurt Pristanski	Geraldton CC, Geraldton
Northwest Territories	Paul Delorey	D'arcy Delorey	Derek Bednarek	Gord Fraser	Hay River CC, Hay River
Nova Scotia	Mike Robinson	Glenn Churchill	Owen Graham	Leo McKenna	Dartmouth CC, Dartmouth
Nunavut	Wade Kingdon	Peter Mackey	Hunter Tootoo	Steve Sharpe	Iqaluit CC, Iqaluit
Ontario	Mike Hull	Matthew Mills	Luke Johnson	Lucas Parafianowicz	Cataraqui G&CC, Kingston
Prince Edward Island	Phillip McInnis	Adam Arsenault	Cory Arsenault	Rodney Hood	Charlottetown CC, Charlottetown
Quebec	Pascal Chouinard	Benoit Gagné	Mixime Bilodeau	Guillaume Turgeon	CC Jacques-Cartier, Lévis
Saskatchewan	Kory Kohuch	Mark Adams	Wes Lang	David Schmirler	Nutana CC, Saskatoon
Yukon	Pat Paslawski	Doug Hamilton	Trent Derkatch	Gary Brown	Whitehorse CC, Whitehorse

=== Round Robin Standings ===
==== Grey pool ====
Team	W	L
Alberta	6	0
Manitoba	4	2
New Brunswick	3	3
Yukon	3	3
Northwest Territories	2	4
British Columbia	2	4
Northern Ontario	0	6

==== Red pool ====
Team	W	L
Saskatchewan	5	1
Ontario	5	1
Quebec	4	2
Prince Edward Island	3	3
Nova Scotia	2	4
Newfoundland and Labrador	2	4
Nunavut	0	6

=== Playoffs ===
Semifinal
R1	Saskatchewan	5
G2	Manitoba	2
G1	Alberta	5
R2	Ontario	6

Final
R1	Saskatchewan	5
R2	Ontario	4

==== Semifinals ====
Friday, November 28, 7:00 pm

Sheet 2	1	2	3	4	5	6	7	8	Final
Manitoba (Fedorchuk)	0	0	0	1	0	1	0	X	2
Saskatchewan (Kohuch)	0	0	2	0	1	0	2	X	5

Sheet 3	1	2	3	4	5	6	7	8	Final
Alberta (Sherrard)	0	0	0	2	0	2	1	0	5
Ontario (Hull)	1	1	1	0	2	0	0	1	6

==== Final ====
Saturday, November 29, 9:00 am

Sheet 4	1	2	3	4	5	6	7	8	Final
Saskatchewan (Kohuch)	0	1	1	1	0	1	0	1	5
Ontario (Hull)	0	0	0	0	3	0	1	0	4

== Women ==
=== Teams ===
The teams are listed as follows:

Province	Skip	Third	Second	Lead	Locale
Alberta	Morgan Muise	Lyndsay Allen	Sarah Evans	Sara Gartner Frey	Calgary CC, Calgary
British Columbia	Diane Myrden	Tricia Mayea	Kari McKinlay	Maria Elzinga	Cowichan CC, Lake Cowichan
Manitoba	Tracy Andries	Crystal Kennedy	Diane Christensen	April Klassen	Fort Rouge CC, Winnipeg
New Brunswick	Shannon Tatlock	Leanne Richardson	Shelley Thomas	Lynn LeBlanc	Curl Moncton, Moncton
Newfoundland and Labrador	Susan Curtis	Amanda Rumboldt	Kathy Miles	Lori Buckle-Stratton	Corner Brook CC, Corner Brook
Northern Ontario	Janice Vettoretti	Meri Bolander	Jessie Orford	Trina Tallon	Sudbury CC, Sudbury
Northwest Territories	Sharon Cormier	Kristan Thompson	Sarah Stroeder	Anneli Jokela	Yellowknife CC, Yellowknife
Nova Scotia	Marion MacAulay	Kerry Denny	Gilda Chisholm	Donalda Buckingham	Bluenose CC, New Glasgow
Nunavut	Geneva Chislett	Denise Hutchings	Robyn Mackey	Jenine Bodner	Iqaluit CC, Iqaluit
Ontario	Kerry Lackie	Lisa McLean	Halyna Tepylo	Cynthia Roth	Westmount G&CC, Kitchener
Prince Edward Island	Tammi Cudmore	Julie Scales	Jane DiCarlo	Annie Chouinard	Charlottetown CC, Charlottetown
Quebec	Nathalie Gagnon	Ann-Sophie Guérin	Laurie Verreault	Sylvie Côté	CC Riverbend, Alma
Saskatchewan	Jana Tisdale	Jade Ivan	Brandi Clarke	Renee Boyd	Highland CC, Regina
Yukon	Sherry MacInnis	Daniyel McNeil	Bev Murphy	Janis Harper	Atlin CC, Atlin, British Columbia

=== Round Robin Standings ===
==== Grey pool ====
Team	W	L
Northwest Territories	5	1
Manitoba	5	1
New Brunswick	4	2
Northern Ontario	3	3
Alberta	3	3
British Columbia	1	5
Yukon	0	6

==== Red pool ====
Team	W	L
Prince Edward Island	5	1
Ontario	5	1
Saskatchewan	4	2
Quebec	4	2
Newfoundland and Labrador	2	4
Nova Scotia	1	5
Nunavut	0	6

=== Playoffs ===
Semifinal
R1	Prince Edward Island	9
G2	Manitoba	5
G1	Northwest Territories	1
R2	Ontario	6

Final
R1	Prince Edward Island	4
R2	Ontario	6

==== Semifinals ====
Friday, November 28, 7:00 pm

Sheet 4	1	2	3	4	5	6	7	8	Final
Prince Edward Island (Cudmore)	3	0	0	4	2	0	0	X	9
Manitoba (Andries)	0	2	1	0	0	1	1	X	5

Sheet 5	1	2	3	4	5	6	7	8	Final
Northwest Territories (Cormier)	0	0	0	0	0	0	1	X	1
Ontario (Lackie)	0	1	3	1	0	1	0	X	6

==== Final ====
Saturday, November 29, 9:00 am

Sheet 3	1	2	3	4	5	6	7	8	Final
Prince Edward Island (Cudmore)	0	2	0	1	0	0	1	X	4
Ontario (Lackie)	0	0	3	0	2	1	0	X	6
