= NOCA =

NOCA may refer to:

- National Organization for Competency Assurance
- Northern Ontario Curling Association
