= 2022 World University Games Qualifier =

- Host city: Ottawa, Ontario
- Arena: RA Centre
- Dates: September 22–25
- Men's winner: (Nova Scotia) Dalhousie Tigers
- Curling club: Halifax CC, Halifax, NS
- Skip: Owen Purcell
- Third: Adam McEachren
- Second: Jeffrey Meagher
- Lead: David McCurdy
- Alternate: Caelan McPherson
- Coach: Anthony Purcell
- Finalist: (Ontario) Wilfrid Laurier Golden Hawks (Mooibroek)
- Women's winner: Alberta Pandas
- Skip: Abby Marks
- Third: Catherine Clifford
- Second: Brianna Cullen
- Lead: Paige Papley
- Alternate: Serena Gray-Withers
- Coach: Amanda St. Laurent
- Finalist: (Saskatchewan) Regina Rams (Englot)

The 2022 World University Games Qualifier was held from September 22 to 25 at the RA Centre in Ottawa, Ontario. This one-time event was used to select Canada's representatives for the 2023 Winter World University Games, as the 2022 U Sports/Curling Canada University Curling Championships was cancelled due to the COVID-19 pandemic. The winning team on both the men's and women's sides will represent Canada at the 2023 Winter World University Games.

== Men ==
=== Qualification ===
The following universities qualified to participate in the 2022 World University Games Qualifier:

Event	Vacancies	Qualified
Atlantic University Sport	~~2~~ 1	(Nova Scotia) Dalhousie Tigers; ~~(Newfoundland and Labrador) Memorial Sea-Hawks~~
Ontario University Athletics	~~2~~ 3	(Ontario) Wilfrid Laurier Golden Hawks (Ontario) TMU Bold (Ontario) Queen's Golden Gaels
Canada West Universities Athletic Association	2	Alberta Golden Bears (Saskatchewan) Regina Rams
TOTAL	6	

=== Teams ===
The teams are listed as follows:

Team	Skip	Third	Second	Lead	Alternate	University
Alberta Golden Bears	Ryan Jacques	Desmond Young	Andrew Gittis	Gabriel Dyck	Jaedon Neuert	University of Alberta
Dalhousie Tigers	Owen Purcell	Adam McEachren	Jeffrey Meagher	David McCurdy	Caelan McPherson	(Nova Scotia) Dalhousie University
Queen's Golden Gaels	Owen Purdy	Connor Massey	Jett Gazeley	Grant Schnurr	Kaamraan Islam	(Ontario) Queen's University at Kingston
Regina Rams	Rylan Kleiter	Jaedon Miller	Carter Williamson	Adam Bukurak	Giovanni Wright	(Saskatchewan) University of Regina
TMU Bold	Weston Oryniak	Eric French	Matt Duizer	Mattias Cheung	Patrick Malas	(Ontario) Toronto Metropolitan University
Wilfrid Laurier Golden Hawks	Sam Mooibroek	Kibo Mulima	Codie Harris	Ben Pearce	Sean McCloskey	(Ontario) Wilfrid Laurier University

=== Round robin standings ===
Final Round Robin Standings

Key
Teams to Playoffs

Team	Skip	W	L	PF	PA	EW	EL	BE	SE
(Nova Scotia) Dalhousie Tigers	Owen Purcell	4	1	39	30	22	20	2	5
Alberta Golden Bears	Ryan Jacques	3	2	30	35	22	21	1	6
(Ontario) Wilfrid Laurier Golden Hawks	Sam Mooibroek	3	2	43	25	21	18	0	8
(Saskatchewan) Regina Rams	Rylan Kleiter	2	3	33	39	22	21	2	6
(Ontario) TMU Bold	Weston Oryniak	2	3	32	40	19	23	3	5
(Ontario) Queen's Golden Gaels	Owen Purdy	1	4	29	37	19	22	4	4

=== Knockout results ===
All draw times listed in Eastern Time (UTC-04:00).

==== Draw 2 ====
Thursday, September 22, 12:30 pm

Sheet A	1	2	3	4	5	6	7	8	9	10	Final
(Ontario) Wilfrid Laurier Golden Hawks (Mooibroek)	0	0	0	1	0	2	0	1	0	1	5
Alberta Golden Bears (Jacques) 🔨	0	1	1	0	1	0	1	0	2	0	6

Sheet B	1	2	3	4	5	6	7	8	9	10	Final
(Ontario) TMU Bold (Oryniak) 🔨	1	0	0	1	0	2	0	0	5	X	9
(Ontario) Queen's Golden Gaels (Purdy)	0	0	1	0	2	0	1	1	0	X	5

Sheet C	1	2	3	4	5	6	7	8	9	10	Final
(Nova Scotia) Dalhousie Tigers (Purcell)	0	0	2	2	0	1	0	4	0	X	9
(Saskatchewan) Regina Rams (Kleiter) 🔨	0	1	0	0	1	0	3	0	1	X	6

==== Draw 4 ====
Thursday, September 22, 8:30 pm

Sheet A	1	2	3	4	5	6	7	8	9	10	Final
(Ontario) TMU Bold (Oryniak)	0	1	0	0	1	0	2	1	0	0	5
(Nova Scotia) Dalhousie Tigers (Purcell) 🔨	1	0	0	1	0	2	0	0	4	1	9

Sheet B	1	2	3	4	5	6	7	8	9	10	11	Final
(Saskatchewan) Regina Rams (Kleiter) 🔨	0	1	0	0	1	0	1	0	1	2	0	5
Alberta Golden Bears (Jacques)	0	0	1	1	0	3	0	1	0	0	1	6

Sheet C	1	2	3	4	5	6	7	8	9	10	Final
(Ontario) Queen's Golden Gaels (Purdy) 🔨	0	2	1	0	4	0	1	1	X	X	9
(Ontario) Wilfrid Laurier Golden Hawks (Mooibroek)	0	0	0	1	0	2	0	0	X	X	3

==== Draw 6 ====
Friday, September 23, 12:30 pm

Sheet B	1	2	3	4	5	6	7	8	9	10	Final
(Ontario) Wilfrid Laurier Golden Hawks (Mooibroek)	2	0	4	0	2	3	0	1	X	X	12
(Ontario) TMU Bold (Oryniak) 🔨	0	1	0	1	0	0	2	0	X	X	4

Sheet C	1	2	3	4	5	6	7	8	9	10	Final
Alberta Golden Bears (Jacques)	0	1	0	1	0	0	1	0	X	X	3
(Nova Scotia) Dalhousie Tigers (Purcell) 🔨	3	0	1	0	1	3	0	2	X	X	10

Sheet D	1	2	3	4	5	6	7	8	9	10	Final
(Ontario) Queen's Golden Gaels (Purdy)	0	0	0	0	1	0	2	0	X	X	3
(Saskatchewan) Regina Rams (Kleiter) 🔨	2	3	1	2	0	1	0	1	X	X	10

==== Draw 8 ====
Friday, September 23, 8:30 pm

Sheet A	1	2	3	4	5	6	7	8	9	10	Final
(Saskatchewan) Regina Rams (Kleiter) 🔨	1	0	0	0	0	0	1	0	X	X	2
(Ontario) Wilfrid Laurier Golden Hawks (Mooibroek)	0	2	1	4	2	3	0	1	X	X	13

Sheet B	1	2	3	4	5	6	7	8	9	10	Final
(Ontario) Queen's Golden Gaels (Purdy)	0	1	0	1	0	0	1	0	2	1	6
(Nova Scotia) Dalhousie Tigers (Purcell) 🔨	1	0	1	0	1	1	0	3	0	0	7

Sheet D	1	2	3	4	5	6	7	8	9	10	Final
Alberta Golden Bears (Jacques) 🔨	0	2	0	1	1	0	0	1	0	0	5
(Ontario) TMU Bold (Oryniak)	1	0	2	0	0	0	0	0	4	1	8

==== Draw 10 ====
Saturday, September 24, 1:00 pm

Sheet A	1	2	3	4	5	6	7	8	9	10	Final
Alberta Golden Bears (Jacques)	0	0	1	0	2	0	2	2	0	1	8
(Ontario) Queen's Golden Gaels (Purdy) 🔨	0	3	0	1	0	2	0	0	0	0	6

Sheet C	1	2	3	4	5	6	7	8	9	10	Final
(Saskatchewan) Regina Rams (Kleiter) 🔨	3	0	0	0	0	2	0	1	2	1	9
(Ontario) TMU Bold (Oryniak)	0	0	1	1	1	0	3	0	0	0	6

Sheet D	1	2	3	4	5	6	7	8	9	10	Final
(Nova Scotia) Dalhousie Tigers (Purcell)	0	2	0	1	1	0	0	0	X	X	4
(Ontario) Wilfrid Laurier Golden Hawks (Mooibroek) 🔨	2	0	3	0	0	3	2	0	X	X	10

=== Playoffs ===
Semifinal			Final
			1	(Nova Scotia) Dalhousie Tigers	8
2	Alberta Golden Bears	7	3	(Ontario) Wilfrid Laurier Golden Hawks	5
3	(Ontario) Wilfrid Laurier Golden Hawks	9

==== Semifinal ====
Saturday, September 24, 7:30 pm

Sheet C	1	2	3	4	5	6	7	8	9	10	Final
Alberta Golden Bears (Jacques) 🔨	1	0	1	1	0	2	1	0	1	0	7
(Ontario) Wilfrid Laurier Golden Hawks (Mooibroek)	0	3	0	0	4	0	0	1	0	1	9

==== Final ====
Sunday, September 25, 11:00 am

Sheet B	1	2	3	4	5	6	7	8	9	10	Final
(Nova Scotia) Dalhousie Tigers (Purcell) 🔨	2	0	0	1	1	1	0	0	0	3	8
(Ontario) Wilfrid Laurier Golden Hawks (Mooibroek)	0	2	0	0	0	0	1	1	1	0	5

== Women ==
=== Qualification ===
The following universities qualified to participate in the 2022 World University Games Qualifier:

Event	Vacancies	Qualified
Atlantic University Sport	2	(Nova Scotia) Dalhousie Tigers (New Brunswick) UNB Reds
Ontario University Athletics	2	(Ontario) Wilfrid Laurier Golden Hawks (Ontario) Waterloo Warriors
Canada West Universities Athletic Association	2	(Saskatchewan) Regina Rams; Alberta Pandas
TOTAL	6	

=== Teams ===
The teams are listed as follows:

Team	Skip	Third	Second	Lead	Alternate	University
Alberta Pandas	Abby Marks	Catherine Clifford	Brianna Cullen	Paige Papley	Serena Gray-Withers	University of Alberta
Dalhousie Tigers	Lindsey Burgess	Allyson MacNutt	Amanda Skiffington	Natasha Fortin	Sadie Pinksen	(Nova Scotia) Dalhousie University
Regina Rams	Krystal Englot	Taylor Stremick	Chantel Hoag	Kyla Thies	Kelsey Deptuck	(Saskatchewan) University of Regina
UNB Reds	Jenna Campbell	Carly Smith	Véronique Carroll	Kirsten Donovan		University of New Brunswick
Waterloo Warriors	Katie Ford	Adrienne Belliveau	Caitlyn Evely	Shannon Warriner	Kyra Woodend	(Ontario) University of Waterloo
Wilfrid Laurier Golden Hawks	Isabelle Ladouceur	Jamie Smith	Kelly Middaugh	Emma McKenzie	Emma Artichuk	(Ontario) Wilfrid Laurier University

=== Round robin standings ===
Final Round Robin Standings

Key
Teams to Playoffs

Team	Skip	W	L	PF	PA	EW	EL	BE	SE
Alberta Pandas	Abby Marks	5	0	43	20	24	16	2	7
(Ontario) Waterloo Warriors	Katie Ford	4	1	40	28	23	18	1	10
(Saskatchewan) Regina Rams	Krystal Englot	3	2	33	34	20	19	3	8
(Nova Scotia) Dalhousie Tigers	Lindsey Burgess	2	3	32	42	19	24	0	6
(Ontario) Wilfrid Laurier Golden Hawks	Isabelle Ladouceur	1	4	36	42	24	24	0	10
(New Brunswick) UNB Reds	Jenna Campbell	0	5	31	49	18	27	0	7

=== Knockout results ===
All draw times listed in Eastern Time (UTC-04:00).

==== Draw 1 ====
Thursday, September 22, 8:30 am

Sheet A	1	2	3	4	5	6	7	8	9	10	Final
(Ontario) Wilfrid Laurier Golden Hawks (Ladouceur) 🔨	3	0	1	1	0	2	0	0	3	2	12
(New Brunswick) UNB Reds (Campbell)	0	2	0	0	2	0	2	3	0	0	9

Sheet B	1	2	3	4	5	6	7	8	9	10	Final
(Ontario) Waterloo Warriors (Ford) 🔨	1	2	4	0	2	0	1	0	1	X	11
(Nova Scotia) Dalhousie Tigers (Burgess)	0	0	0	1	0	3	0	2	0	X	6

Sheet C	1	2	3	4	5	6	7	8	9	10	Final
(Saskatchewan) Regina Rams (Englot)	0	1	0	0	0	0	2	0	X	X	3
Alberta Pandas (Marks) 🔨	2	0	1	0	2	2	0	1	X	X	8

==== Draw 3 ====
Thursday, September 22, 4:30 pm

Sheet A	1	2	3	4	5	6	7	8	9	10	Final
(Ontario) Waterloo Warriors (Ford) 🔨	0	1	0	0	4	0	3	1	X	X	9
(Saskatchewan) Regina Rams (Englot)	0	0	0	1	0	1	0	0	X	X	2

Sheet B	1	2	3	4	5	6	7	8	9	10	Final
Alberta Pandas (Marks) 🔨	0	3	0	4	0	1	0	0	2	X	10
(New Brunswick) UNB Reds (Campbell)	1	0	1	0	1	0	1	1	0	X	5

Sheet C	1	2	3	4	5	6	7	8	9	10	Final
(Nova Scotia) Dalhousie Tigers (Burgess)	0	0	2	0	3	1	0	3	1	X	10
(Ontario) Wilfrid Laurier Golden Hawks (Ladouceur) 🔨	1	2	0	2	0	0	1	0	0	X	6

==== Draw 5 ====
Friday, September 23, 8:30 am

Sheet B	1	2	3	4	5	6	7	8	9	10	Final
(Ontario) Wilfrid Laurier Golden Hawks (Ladouceur)	0	0	0	1	1	1	1	1	0	0	5
(Ontario) Waterloo Warriors (Ford) 🔨	1	1	2	0	0	0	0	0	1	2	7

Sheet C	1	2	3	4	5	6	7	8	9	10	Final
(New Brunswick) UNB Reds (Campbell)	0	3	0	1	0	2	0	0	0	X	6
(Saskatchewan) Regina Rams (Englot) 🔨	1	0	0	0	3	0	2	1	1	X	8

Sheet D	1	2	3	4	5	6	7	8	9	10	Final
(Nova Scotia) Dalhousie Tigers (Burgess)	0	0	1	0	0	1	0	2	X	X	4
Alberta Pandas (Marks) 🔨	3	2	0	1	4	0	1	0	X	X	11

==== Draw 7 ====
Friday, September 23, 4:30 pm

Sheet A	1	2	3	4	5	6	7	8	9	10	Final
Alberta Pandas (Marks) 🔨	0	1	0	1	0	1	0	0	2	1	6
(Ontario) Wilfrid Laurier Golden Hawks (Ladouceur)	0	0	1	0	2	0	1	1	0	0	5

Sheet B	1	2	3	4	5	6	7	8	9	10	Final
(Nova Scotia) Dalhousie Tigers (Burgess) 🔨	2	0	0	0	0	0	0	1	X	X	3
(Saskatchewan) Regina Rams (Englot)	0	1	2	1	4	1	1	0	X	X	10

Sheet D	1	2	3	4	5	6	7	8	9	10	Final
(New Brunswick) UNB Reds (Campbell)	0	0	2	3	2	0	0	0	0	X	7
(Ontario) Waterloo Warriors (Ford) 🔨	1	2	0	0	0	1	1	2	3	X	10

==== Draw 9 ====
Saturday, September 24, 9:00 am

Sheet A	1	2	3	4	5	6	7	8	9	10	Final
(New Brunswick) UNB Reds (Campbell) 🔨	1	1	0	2	0	0	0	0	0	X	4
(Nova Scotia) Dalhousie Tigers (Burgess)	0	0	1	0	3	1	2	1	1	X	9

Sheet C	1	2	3	4	5	6	7	8	9	10	Final
Alberta Pandas (Marks) 🔨	0	2	0	2	1	2	0	1	X	X	8
(Ontario) Waterloo Warriors (Ford)	0	0	2	0	0	0	1	0	X	X	3

Sheet D	1	2	3	4	5	6	7	8	9	10	Final
(Saskatchewan) Regina Rams (Englot) 🔨	1	0	0	0	1	0	2	0	2	4	10
(Ontario) Wilfrid Laurier Golden Hawks (Ladouceur)	0	1	3	1	0	2	0	1	0	0	8

=== Playoffs ===
Semifinal			Final
			1	Alberta Pandas	11
2	(Ontario) Waterloo Warriors	4	3	(Saskatchewan) Regina Rams	4
3	(Saskatchewan) Regina Rams	11

==== Semifinal ====
Saturday, September 24, 7:30 pm

Sheet B	1	2	3	4	5	6	7	8	9	10	Final
(Ontario) Waterloo Warriors (Ford) 🔨	0	1	0	0	0	0	3	0	0	X	4
(Saskatchewan) Regina Rams (Englot)	0	0	0	4	1	3	0	2	1	X	11

==== Final ====
Sunday, September 25, 11:00 am

Sheet C	1	2	3	4	5	6	7	8	9	10	Final
Alberta Pandas (Marks) 🔨	2	0	5	0	1	0	1	2	X	X	11
(Saskatchewan) Regina Rams (Englot)	0	1	0	2	0	1	0	0	X	X	4
