= A Summer Night =

Canadian music variety show

- Genre: Variety show
- Written by: Rich Eustis; Paul Wayne
- Directed by: Stan Harris
- Presented by: Shirley Harmer; Alan Hamel
- Country of origin: Canada
- Original language: English
- No. of seasons: 1

Production
- Producers: Bill Davis; Stan Harris
- Running time: 30 minutes

Original release
- Network: CBC Television
- Release: 29 June – 21 September 1962

A Summer Night is a Canadian music variety show that aired on CBC Television in 1962.

== Premise ==
Summer events and pastimes were the theme of this program, which was hosted by Shirley Harmer and Alan Hamel. Topics included summertime fashion and what hockey players such as Bernie Geoffrion did between playing seasons. Music was performed by the Billy Van Four, Tommy Common and Harmer under the direction of Denny Vaughan.

== Scheduling ==
The half-hour program aired at 9:00 p.m. (Eastern) from 29 June to 21 September 1962.
