= Fellowes High School =

Location
- 420 Bell Street; Pembroke, Ontario, K8A 2K5; Canada; 45°48′55″N 77°05′40″W

Information
- School type: Public, high school
- Motto: Opportunity for Growth and Success
- Founded: 1969
- Area trustee: Terry Harkins
- School number: 925365
- Principal: Megan Robillard
- Grades: 9–12
- Enrollment: 928 (2011)
- Language: English
- Area: Renfrew County
- Colours: Black and Gold
- Mascot: Freddy The Falcon
- Team name: Falcons
- Website: fhs.rcdsb.on.ca/en/

Fellowes High School (FHS) is a high school located at 420 Bell Street in Pembroke, Ontario, Canada. It is the city's only public, English language high school and is managed by the Renfrew County District School Board. 928 students are enrolled at the school.

== Alternative programs ==
Fellowes offers several alternative options. The most popular though, is the KI Program. The KI program is a partnership between KI (Kruger International Pembroke) and the Renfrew County District School Board. It serves to facilitate school–work transition for high school students. For over ten years it has been running as one of the school board's options for the Alternative School Program. Half of the day the students work on their individualized curriculum plans(correspondence). Co-op placements and industrial training on the factory floor make up the other half of their day.

== Notable alumni ==
- Jason Blaine, country singer
- Alasdair Roberts, professor and author
- Madeleine Kelly, 800m, 1500m runner

== See also ==
- Education in Ontario
- List of secondary schools in Ontario
