= Westmount Golf and Country Club =

Country club in Kitchener, Ontario

Coordinates: 43.4492°N 80.5369°W

- Founded: 7 September 1929
- Location: 50 Inverness Drive, Kitchener, Ontario
- Activities: Golf; Tennis; Curling
- Website: westmountgolf.com

The Westmount Golf and Country Club is a private sports and country club located in Kitchener, Ontario, Canada. Its grounds span the municipal boundary with Waterloo. The club features golf, curling and tennis facilities.

The club was founded in 1929 by members of the Grand River Golf and Country Club. The club was officially opened in 1931, and its golf course architect was Stanley Thompson. The curling facility was opened in 1963 and a tennis facility in 1977.

== Golf ==
The Ontario Open was held at the club in 1951. Smiley Quick won the tournament with a score of 209, beating out local players Moe Norman (219) and Jerry Kesselring (215).

Other major golf tournaments held at the Westmount have included the Canadian Open Golf Championship in 1957, the Canadian Ladies Open and Closed Championship in 1965, the Canadian Amateur Golf Championship in 1969, the Labatt's International Golf Classic for the C.P.G.A. in 1981, and the 1990 du Maurier Classic.

== Curling ==
Westmount Golf and Country Club
- Interactive map of Westmount Golf and Country Club

Information
- Established: 1963 (curling)
- Club type: Dedicated ice
- Curling Canada region: OCA Zone 12
- Sheets of ice: Six
- Rock colours: Red and Yellow
- Website: http://www.westmountgolf.com/curling.aspx

The Westmount Club has been home to many provincial champions:

- 1995 Master (60+) Women: Betty MacMillan, Leile Walter, Marjorie McCauley, Marlene Olender
- 2008 Bantam (U16) Boys: Mike Flemming, Brett Dekoning, Dave Mathers, Ian Romansky
- 2010 Pepsi Ontario Junior Curling Championships (Men's): Jake Walker, Craig Van Ymeren, Geoff Chambers, Matthew Mapletoft (National champions)
- 2010 Bantam (U16) Girls: Kendall Haymes, Margot Flemming, Cassie Savage, Megan Arnold
- 2010 Tim Hortons Colts (Men's): Mark Kean, Andrew Flemming, Edward Cyr, Terry Arnold
- 2014 Travelers Curling Club Championship (Women's): Kerry Lackie, Lisa McLean, Halyna Tepylo, Cynthia Roth (National champions)
- 2017 & 2018 Ontario U21 Men's Curling Champions: Matthew Hall, Jeffery Wanless, Joseph Hart, David Hart

The Club hosted the 2007 Canadian Mixed Curling Championship.
