= Oshawa Central Collegiate Institute =

Location
- 155 Gibb Street; Oshawa, Ontario, L1J 1Y4; Canada

Information
- School type: Public
- Founded: 1950
- Closed: 2016
- School board: Durham District School Board
- Principal: Lucy Sharp
- Grades: 9-12
- Enrolment: 288 (2015)
- Language: English
- Website: www.ddsb.ca/school/oshawacentralci

Oshawa Central Collegiate Institute was a Public Secondary School located in Oshawa, Ontario within the Durham District School Board. The school had students in grades 9-12 and offered a wide range of academic and extracurricular activities.

The Pathway Opportunities offered at Oshawa Central included Specialist High Skills Major (SHSM) programs in Culinary Arts, Outdoor Education, Fitness, Communications Technology, and Automotive Technology.

The current school building was previously known as General Vanier Secondary School. After Vanier was merged with nearby Oshawa Central Collegiate Institute, the older "Central" name was retained.

Oshawa Central CI had a plethora of Technological studies programming, including Culinary Arts, Baking, Woodworking, Construction, Communications Technology, Automotive Technology, Automotive Design, and Hair Dressing/Aesthetics. OCCI partnered with Durham College to offer Hair Dressing to college students and was regularly a site for the Ontario Youth Apprenticeship Program (OYAP) in Hair Styling.

Oshawa Central CI hosted a variety of programs for students with special needs, including a Frontenac treatment classroom, a Multiple Exceptionalities classroom, a School-to-Work classroom, a Practical Learning Placement class, a Senior Associated class, and a Dual Diagnostic class.

On June 30, 2016, Oshawa Central CI closed after 66 years.

== Notable alumni ==
- John MacLean: former NHL player and Stanley Cup winner with the New Jersey Devils. John also coached the New Jersey Devils, during the 2010-11 year.
- The Honourable Ed Broadbent, PC, CC: Former leader of the New Democratic Party of Canada.
- Sandra Bouckley: Vice-President of GKN Driveline Americas
- Candice Hollingshead: first female firefighter for the City of Oshawa
- Bill Marshall, OC: co-founder of the Toronto International Film Festival
- The Honourable Alex Sosna: judge of the Ontario Superior Court of Justice

== See also ==
- List of high schools in Ontario
