= Burlington Curling Club =

Curling club in Burlington, Ontario, Canada

- Location: 2295 New Street; Burlington, Ontario; L7R 1J4

Information
- Established: 1952
- Club type: Dedicated ice
- Curling Canada region: OCA Zone 13
- Sheets of ice: Five
- Rock colours: Red and Yellow
- Website: http://www.burlcurl.com/

The Burlington Curling Club, which was founded in 1952, is located in Burlington, Ontario, Canada.

The club is one of the busiest curling rinks in Canada, being home to over 800 active members.

== Affiliation ==
BCC is a member club of the Ontario Curling Association (OCA). This association divides the province into sixteen zones which are then organized into four regions. This association oversees all curling activities in Ontario. The OCA runs a variety of competitions each year for men, women, and youth. Some competitions lead to provincial championships while others lead to national and, in some cases, international championships. The association also provides training clinics for coaches, ice-technicians, officials, and players.

BCC is in Zone 13, along with 11 other clubs. These include: Burlington Golf and CC, Dundas Granite CC, Dundas Valley CC, Glanford CC, Glendale Golf and CC, Hamilton Victoria CC, Niagara Falls CC, St. Catharine's CC, St. Catharine's Golf and CC, and Welland CC.

== See also ==
- List of Curling Clubs in Ontario
