= Royal Canadian Curling Club =

Sports club

Royal Canadian Curling Club "The Royals"
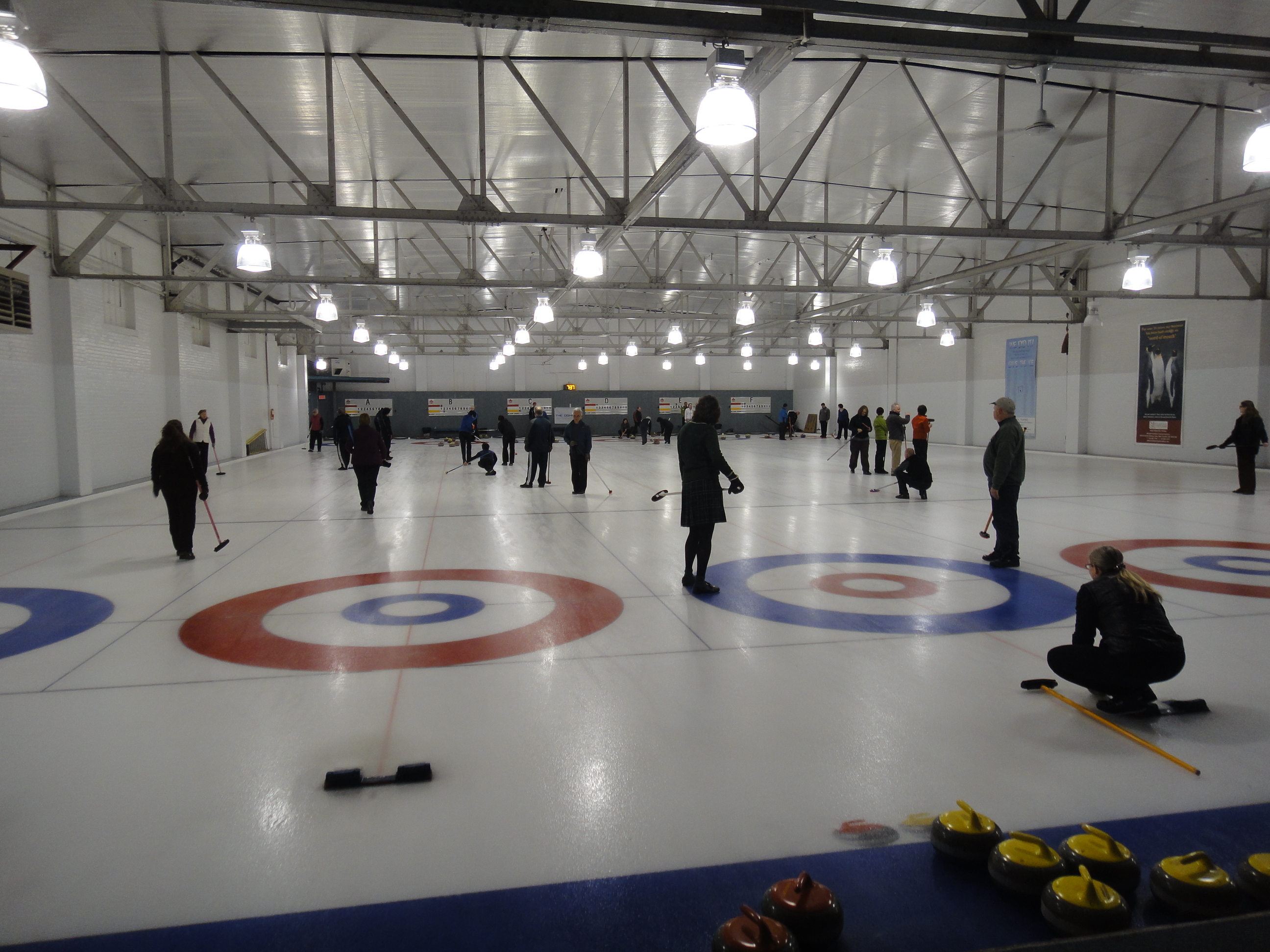
- Curlers at play in a mixed recreational league
- Interactive map of Royal Canadian Curling Club "The Royals"
- Location: 131 Broadview Avenue; Toronto, Ontario M4M 2E9; 43.65986°N 79.34983°W

Information
- Established: Royal Canadian Bicycle Club (1891); Royal Canadian Bicycle and Curling Club (1929); Royal Canadian Curling Club (1953)
- Founders: David Smith, Albert Edwin Walton
- Club type: Dedicated ice
- Curling Canada region: OCA Zone 8
- Sheets of ice: Six
- Rock colours: Red and Yellow
- Website: https://royalcanadiancurling.com/

The Royal Canadian Curling Club is a curling club located in the Riverdale neighbourhood of Toronto, Ontario, Canada. The clubhouse on Broadview Avenue was originally built in 1907 by the Royal Canadian Bicycle Club, while the ice arena was added in 1929. In addition to cycling activities, the club had featured skating, baseball, ice hockey, curling, and ten-pin bowling, until 1953, when the club decided to focus exclusively on curling activities.

Known to its members as The Royals, the club hosts house league draws on evenings from Sunday to Friday as well as Tuesday afternoons. The club also hosts associate leagues including the Riverdale League, the Rotators, and the Insurance Curling League.

The club has sponsored winning teams at provincial curling championships. In 1955, Andy Grant won The British Consols, southern Ontario's men's curling championship. This tournament has gone through a number of name changes in its history and is now known as the Ontario Tankard. Mike McEwen won a second provincial title for the club in 2023. Ontario Scott Tournament of Hearts winners include Carol Thompson in 1982 and 1987 and Hollie Duncan in 2018. In Senior's curling, Jim Sharples has won a number of events including 1992 & 1994 (Joe Todd Sr.), 1998 (T.E. Financial Consultants Ltd.), 1999 (CIBC Seniors), and the Tim Hortons Masters in 2000 and 2003. Bob Wood and Carol Thompson represented Ontario at the Seagram Mixed Tournament in 1977.

== History ==
In 1964 the club hosted the inaugural event of the Canadian Mixed Curling Championship. The first championship was won by Ernie Boushy of Winnipeg, Manitoba with a record of 9-1. The club continued hosting the event in 1965.

== Governance ==
The club is governed by a board of directors who are elected by the members of the club. There are currently 6 board members. The club is member owned. New members purchase equity in the club when they start to curl. The equity is returned to the club when they resign as a member. Only active curlers are allowed to hold equity in the club. There are about 400 active curlers.

The club employs a general manager, two bartenders, a full-time and a part-time ice maker.

== Bonspiels ==
In 1938, the Men's Invitational Bonspiel was created. It ran for 27 years before ending in 1964. In 2003, the event was revived. The event is held late March running from Thursday to Sunday. The 2003 event featured Ontario's venerable Ed Werenich who came a close second in the tournament to the club's own Rob MacKay. In 2009, Ed's son Ryan Werenich skipped the winning team.

Other regular events include the Turkey Spiel in December, Curling Night in Canada in February, and the women's spiel entitled the Royal Flush.

The associate Riverdale League—the oldest and largest gay curling league in Canada, founded in 1962—also holds an annual spiel entitled Do It On The Ice. Riverdale and the Royals have twice hosted the annual Canadian Gay Curling Championship, most recently in 2015, when Toronto curler John Epping threw the ceremonial first rock.
