= Northern Ontario Curling Association =

Because Northern Ontario is not a province, teams representing Northern Ontario sometimes use this emblem to represent them on their curling coats.

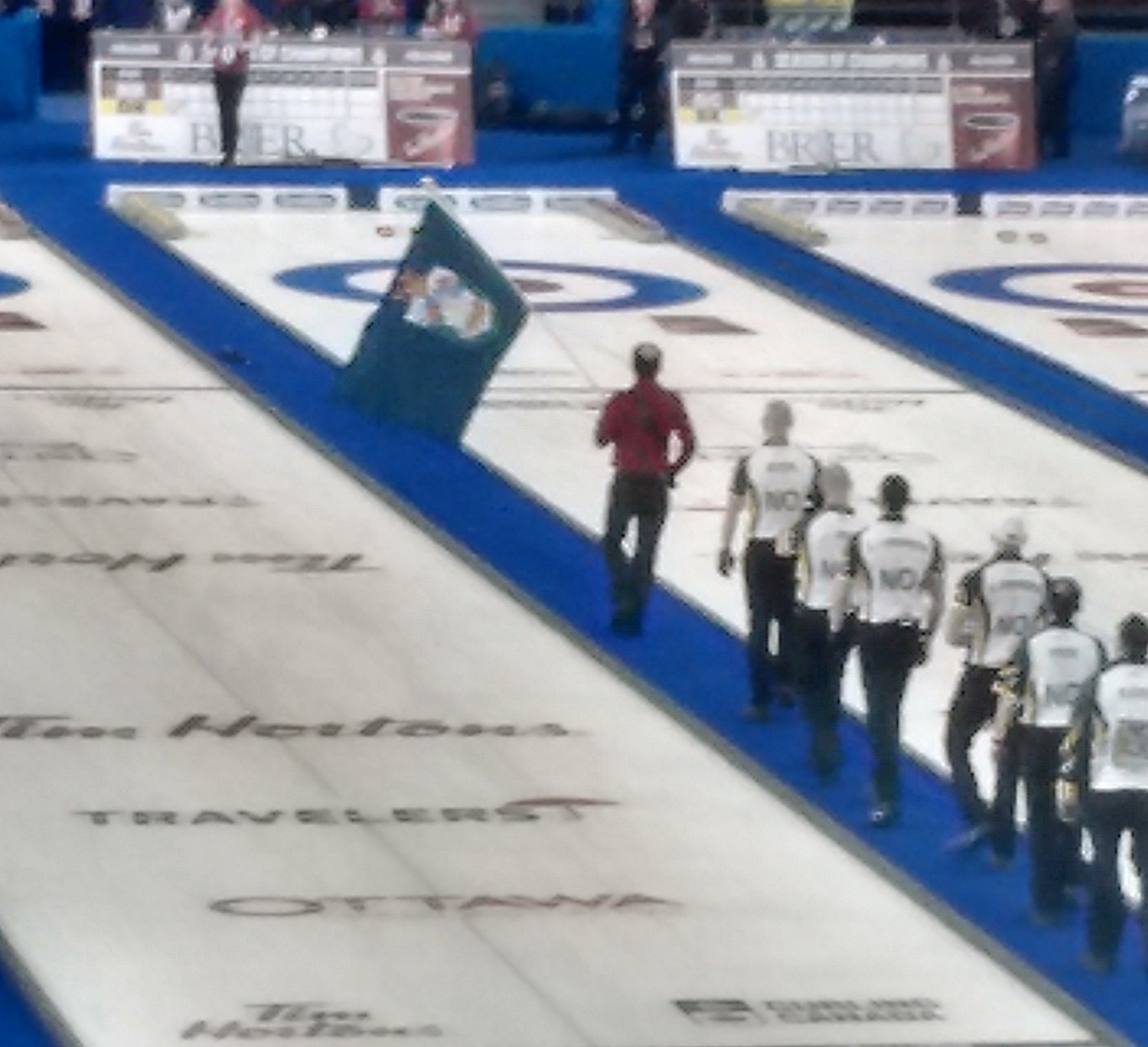
At some national tournaments, Northern Ontario is piped in under their own flag, with the association's coat of arms on it

The Northern Ontario Curling Association is the regional governing body for the sport of curling in Northern Ontario.

== History ==
The NOCA was founded in 2007 upon the amalgamation of the Northwestern Ontario Curling Association, Northern Ontario Ladies Curling Association, the former Northern Ontario Curling Association and Temiskaming & Northern Ontario Curling Association. Prior to 2007, the region as a whole was governed by the Northern Ontario Curling Federation.

When it comes to curling in Canada, Northern Ontario is treated as if it were a province. It is the only sub-provincial region that sends teams to the various national championships, though until 2015, the Scotties Tournament of Hearts lacked a separate Northern Ontario team. Northern Ontario's separate entry exists due to historical precedent. Ever since the very first Brier has Northern Ontario been represented. The rest of Ontario is governed by the Ontario Curling Association.

In 2026, it was announced that the Northern Ontario Curling Association is proposing to merge with Curling Ontario (which represents southern Ontario) and the Ontario Curling Council (which exists to deal with federal funding).

== Championships ==
- Bantams (under 16)
- Juniors (under 20)
- Men's
- Women's
- Mixed (see mixed curling)
- Seniors (50+)
- Masters (60+)
- Wheelchair (see wheelchair curling)
- The Dominion Curling Club Championships

== Notable people ==
- Frank Sargent (1902 – 1988), founding president of the Northwestern Ontario Curling Association in 1946
- Mike Harris, appointed executive director in 2022.
