= Cataraqui Golf and Country Club =

Canadian private golf club

Coordinates: 44.225°N 76.535°W

- Interactive map of Cataraqui Golf and Country Club
- Location: 961 King Street West; Kingston, Ontario, Canada

Information
- Established: 1917
- Club type: Dedicated Ice
- Curling Canada region: OCA Zone 4
- Sheets of ice: Six
- Rock colours: Blue and Yellow
- Website: www.cataraqui.com

Cataraqui Golf and Country Club is a private golf and curling club located in Kingston, Ontario, Canada. It was founded in 1917.

== History ==
=== Early golf in Kingston, the Kingston Golf Club ===
Cataraqui G&CC was established in 1917. Its founding arose from development pressures in downtown Kingston. The new club was built on land that was then on the western edge of settlement for the city and district, following the World War I-era construction of the LaSalle Causeway and provincial highway, across the Cataraqui River as it feeds into Lake Ontario, in downtown Kingston.

This new highway also crossed the property used by the Kingston Golf Club, disrupting the flow of play there. Kingston had been a military centre since its founding as Fort Frontenac by French explorers in 1673, on the site of an aboriginal settlement known as Cataraqui, and the military base was being expanded to large extent, with the world war, necessitating the causeway and highway construction. The Kingston Golf Club, located on the Barriefield Common, just north of the Royal Military College of Canada and Fort Henry, just west of the village of Barriefield, and just east of the Cataraqui River, was the first golf course in the area. The Kingston Golf Club operated from 1886 to 1887, and then again from 1891 to 1925, eventually with 13 distinct holes, and was a charter 1895 member of the Royal Canadian Golf Association. The Kingston Golf Club has been identified as the fourth oldest golf club in North America. The first Canadian Amateur Championship winner in 1895, Thomas Harley, a Scottish immigrant carpenter and stevedore, employed on the dockyards at RMC, represented the Kingston Golf Club. The Kingston Golf Club operated until 1925, with a modified layout, but the area's golfers gradually switched to Cataraqui in the years prior to 1925.

=== Early years of Cataraqui G&CC ===
The original course at Cataraqui was located past the western edge of the city at that time, on Lake Ontario. It had six holes; the club gradually acquired more land and expanded to 13 holes by 1921; by June 1925 the course had 18 holes. One of the original designers was likely George Cumming, a top Toronto golf professional, Canadian Open and Canadian PGA Championship winner, and golf course architect, who is a member of the Canadian Golf Hall of Fame. Nine different course routings, using different sections of land, were used from 1917 to 1932.

=== Thompson redesigns the course, 1931-33 ===
In 1931, Stanley Thompson, already a world-famous golf course architect, was hired to redesign the course. The club was selling some land (and losing several holes, to facilitate the construction of grain elevators and other development) near Lake Ontario, while acquiring new land, the former Gravelle Farm, to the north and west of its holdings. The western boundary became the marshlands around the Little Cataraqui Creek. Thompson used the new, much larger property to design and build several new holes, including most of the present back nine. He kept several of the existing holes, and reshaped several others. Thompson had left Kingston before the new course was completed; his work was finished by the club's professional, Richard H. (Dick) Green, likely assisted by Thompson's employee C. E. (Robbie) Robinson, an apprentice golf course architect. The new course, opened in May 1933, drew acclaim from the beginning.

Cataraqui began hosting important events soon after its redesign, and was ranked #57 on the list of Canada's top courses in 2006 by Scoregolf magazine. The 15th hole, a very challenging 206-yard uphill par 3, christened 'Plateau', has often been ranked among the top holes in Canada. The routing plan from Thompson's 1931 redesign has remained intact.

=== 1973 clubhouse fire ===
The original clubhouse, opened in 1922, burned to the ground on August 16, 1973, destroying virtually all of the club's archives and many of its trophies, but with no loss of life. A photo of the fire was published in many newspapers around the world.

Canadian golf course architect Doug Carrick has been consulting to the Club for the past dozen years. Carrick's work has seen the bunkers completely refurbished, and several new fairway bunkers added, notably on holes 5, 9, 10, 16, and 17, tightening the driving zones. From the back tees, with new tees having been constructed on holes 4, 10, 13 and 16, the course currently plays to a maximum length of nearly 6,600 yards, par 70. Cataraqui celebrated its centennial in 2017, and successfully hosted the 2017 Canadian Junior Boys' Championship, from July 31 to August 3.

== Golf: tournaments, champions, and notable players ==
Cataraqui has been a frequent host site for national, provincial and major local events, including the Ontario Amateur Championship (1939, 1952, 1963); the Ontario Ladies' Amateur Championship (1937, 1965, 1977, 1996); the Ontario Open (1955, 1958, 1966, 1973, 1979); the Canadian PGA Championship (1936, 1938); the Canadian PGA Seniors Championship in 1997; the Ontario Junior Match Play Championship in 2009; the Ontario University Athletics championship on several occasions, including 2011; and the 2017 Canadian Junior Boys Championship. Major annual local events include the elite Kingston Whig-Standard men's tournament, and the elite Eastern Provinces women's tournament. Notable champions from events staged at Cataraqui have included Sandy Somerville, Marlene Streit, Moe Norman, Warren Sye, Jerry Anderson, and Brooke Henderson.

Notable golfers from the club include Richard H. (Dick) Green, the club's professional for nearly 40 years, who assisted Stanley Thompson with the 1931-33 redesign; Mark Siemonsen (1974 Ontario Juvenile champion and 1977 Ontario University champion); local legend Ronald G. Brown; 1981 Ontario Junior champion Barry Wood; Canadian Professional Golf Tour event champion John Colwell; 2002 Willingdon Cup players Craig Revell and Jeff Crowe; two-time Ontario Junior champion Brad Revell; Ontario University Athletics women's champion (2006 and 2008) Danielle Green; 2011 Ontario Women's Mid-Amateur champion Patti Hogeboom; and Canadian Professional Golf Tour event champion Matt McQuillan. McQuillan, who earned PGA Tour playing privileges in December 2010 for the 2011 season, and who was also a PGA Tour member in 2012, set a new competitive course record of 62 in a Pro-Am tournament in July 2008, breaking the mark set in 2003 by Chris Barber (a former Cataraqui member and several times Ottawa Zone CPGA champion) by one stroke. McQuillan's achievement was celebrated by the Club on December 21, 2010; he received an honorary membership; he split the 2012 season between the PGA Tour and the Nationwide Tour. Current Cataraqui Club professionals include Canadian former Tour players Malcolm Trickey and Kevin Dickey, and 1998 Ontario Ladies' Amateur champion Kristen MacLaren.

== Curling ==
The club's curling program was begun in 1961, with six sheets of ice installed in an addition to the clubhouse. With the arrival of curling, the club became a year-round operation. Curling was retained in 1975 with the opening of the new clubhouse, again with six sheets of ice.

=== Provincial curling champions ===
Notable curlers include Ted Brown, third on the Ontario Tankard champion (Dr. Alex Scott, skip) rink 1975-76, and also skip of the Ontario Mixed champion rink that same year.

- 1975 Ontario Tankard: Alex Scott, Ted Brown, Mike Boyd, Tom Miller
- 1976 Mixed: Ted Brown, Kay O'Neill, Mike Boyd, Brenda Kuluk
- 2013 Fairfield Marriott Challenge (men's): Mike Hull, Matt Mills, Luke Johnson, Lucas Parafianowicz
- 2014 Fairfield Marriott Challenge (men's): Brian Lewis, Chris Lewis, David Staples, Kyle Thompson
- 2014 Travelers (men's): Mike Hull, Matt Mills, Luke Johnson, Lucas Parafianowicz
- 2016 Travelers (men's): Welsey Forget, David Staples, Graham Rathwell, Sandy Staples (National champions)
- 2018 Dominion Regalia Silver Tankard (men's): Dr. Jonathan Beuk, Scott Chadwick, Wesley Forget, Andrew Inouye, David Staples, Matthew Mills, Mike Hull, Luke Johnson
- 2019 Ontario Tankard (men's): Scott McDonald, Dr. Jonathan Beuk, Wesley Forget, Scott Chadwick
- 2020 Ontario U-21 (men's): Owen Purdy, Josua Leung, Nathan Steele, Colin Schnurr
