= Quinte Curling Club =

The Quinte Curling Club is a curling club in Belleville, Ontario, Canada.

The city of Belleville was without a curling club since the closing of the Belleville Curling Club (which had been founded in 1867) in the 1920s. That all changed with the founding of the Quinte Curling Club in 1957. The club was built on city fair grounds in the west end of town on Bridge Street W. While the club was being built, club games would be played at CFB Trenton. The facility was first opened on February 15, 1958. Mayor Gerald Hyde would throw the first stone.

At the time of the founding of the club, the only women who could be members had to be wives of the male members. It was not until the 1988-89 season that the ladies' section of the club would be fully integrated with the rest of the club and have the same rights.

The club has had four sheets for the entirety of its history. The club is located in Zone 4 of the Ontario Curling Association, and remains the only curling club in Belleville to this day.

== Provincial champions ==
The club has won one provincial mixed title and one senior men's provincial championship. In 1964, skip Mac White, Heather White, Ron Benn and Agnes Benn won the provincial mixed championship (known then as the "Rose Bowl". In 1974, skip Bill Riley, Vaughan Storey, Bill Spinelli and Chris Glithero won the provincial men's senior championship.

In 2012, the club won the women's The Dominion Curling Club Championship with skip Caroline Deans, Sheri-Lynn Collyer, Kendra Lafleur and Lynn Stapley.
