= Unionville Curling Club =

- Where Friendship is a Tradition
- Location: 257 Carlton Road, Unionville, Ontario, L3R 2A3

Information
- Established: 1919
- Sheets of ice: 4
- Rock colours: red and blue
- Website: www.unionvillecurlingclub.com

The Unionville Curling Club is a privately owned 4-sheet curling club located in Unionville, Ontario. The club was founded in 1919, and is an active member of Curling Canada, CurlON, and Toronto Curling Association.

== Notable members ==
- Hollie Duncan
- Kim Gellard
- Ray Grant
- Shane Konings
- Lauren Wasylkiw
