= RA Centre =

Sports and event venue in Ottawa, Ontario

RA Center
- Interactive map of RA Center
- Address: 2451 Riverside Drive
- Location: Ottawa, Ontario
- Owner: Recreation Association of the Public Service of Canada
- Type: Recreation centre

Tenant
- Ottawa Rapid FC (Training)

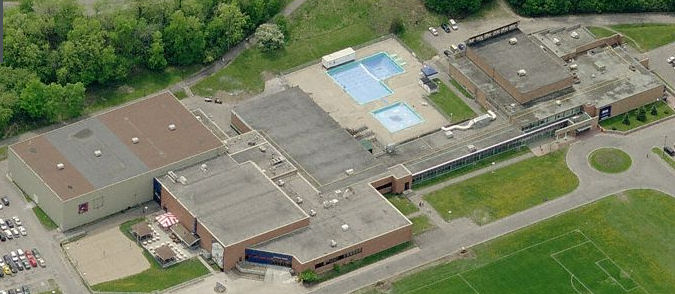
The RA Centre in Ottawa

The RA Centre is a recreation and activity centre in Ottawa, Ontario, Canada. It is operated by the Recreation Association of the Public Service of Canada (more commonly known as the RA).

The Centre is located on Riverside Drive near the corner of Bank Street, next to Billings Bridge Plaza. It is built on the site of the brickyards of the Ottawa Brick and Terra Cotta Co. Ltd, which was bought by the Federal government in 1954 and closed in 1958.

Having been in business for over 75 years and with a membership that exceeds 22,000, the RA is one of the largest community sport, recreation and fitness not-for-profits in the National Capital Region. The RA operates out of the RA Centre and fourteen corporate fitness centres in the region.

The RA is governed by a volunteer board and operated by a combination of paid staff and volunteers. Over fifty programs are offered, including squash, badminton, hockey, soccer, archery and table tennis. The RA Centre offers a restaurant and conference rooms which can be booked for meetings or weddings.
