= 1968 Canadian Ladies Curling Association Championship =

Canadian women's curling championship

- Host city: St. James, Manitoba
- Arena: St. James Civic Centre
- Dates: February 26 – March 1
- Winner: Alberta
- Curling club: Crestwood CC, Edmonton
- Skip: Hazel Jamison
- Third: Gail Lee
- Second: Jackie Spencer
- Lead: June Coyle
- Finalist: British Columbia (Myrtle Fashoway)

The 1968 tournament of the Canadian Ladies Curling Association Championship, the Canadian women's curling championship, was held over five days from February 26 to March 1, 1968, at the St. James Civic Centre in St. James, Manitoba (now part of Winnipeg).

The teams representing the provinces of Alberta and British Columbia (BC) both finished round robin play on February 29 tied for first with 7–2 records, necessitating a tiebreaker playoff between the two teams to determine the championship. Team Alberta, who was skipped by Hazel Jamison captured the championship after defeating BC in the tiebreaker 11–4. This was Alberta's second championship overall as they previously won in 1966. This was the first time in which a tiebreaker playoff determined the women's championship, as the previous three tiebreaker playoffs (1961, 1963, and 1964) were to determine second place.

This championship set a record for the most extra-end games in one tournament, with five being played. This broke the previous mark of four which had happened twice, in 1961 and 1966. The record only lasted until the following year’s tournament.

== Event summary ==
Heading into the Wednesday evening draw (Draw 7 – the third draw of the day), four teams had a chance of winning the championship, as British Columbia (BC) and Manitoba were tied for first at 5–1, while Alberta and Saskatchewan were tied for third at 4–2.

The status quo was maintained by the Wednesday evening draw results, with BC defeating New Brunswick 9–4, Alberta beating Newfoundland 10–2, Saskatchewan beating Prince Edward Island 8–7, and Manitoba defeating Ontario 8–7 in an extra end. With BC still having to face Manitoba and Alberta in the two Thursday draws, things remained wide open heading into the final day of round robin play.

The penultimate draw on the morning of February 29 provided more clarity on which teams would be in contention heading into the final draw on the Thursday evening. The first one to fall was Saskatchewan as they lost to New Brunswick 6–4, thus eliminating Saskatchewan from championship contention. Alberta stayed alive as they scored five in the second end and never looked back in their 9–5 victory over Quebec. Meanwhile, Manitoba appeared to have a stranglehold in their matchup with BC as they led 6–2 through six ends. However, BC scored five in the last four ends to win 7–6 and took over sole possession of first place.

The final draw would have huge implications, especially with the Alberta vs. BC matchup. If BC won, then they would clinch the title outright, while an Alberta win would force a tiebreaker playoff. If both Alberta and Manitoba won, then a three-way tiebreaker would determine the championship. The latter scenario did not eventuate, as Manitoba blew yet another lead (this time 7–5 after six ends) and New Brunswick scored seven in the last four ends to win 12–7, eliminating Manitoba.

It then appeared that BC would come away with the title, as after six ends they led Alberta 7–2. However that changed quickly as Alberta scored five in the seventh end to tie the game. The two teams traded singles in the next two ends and scores were level at 8 heading into the final end, with BC having hammer. On Jamison's last rock of the game for Alberta, she drew to the side of the button, but Fashoway of the BC team made an angle raise to the other side of the button. The rocks were too close to the pin to be measured, so an umpire had to make the decision to determine which rock was closer; the point—and the victory—was awarded to Alberta. This forced a tiebreaker playoff on the Friday morning to determine the championship.

In the rematch between Alberta and BC on Friday morning, Alberta scored singles in each of the first three ends to jump out to a 3–0 lead. BC cut Alberta's lead down to one with two in the fourth. But that was as close as BC got, as Alberta put the game away with five in the fifth and a steal of two in the sixth to take a commanding 10–2 lead and eventually capture the championship 11–4 after BC conceded the tenth end.

== Teams ==
The teams are listed as follows:

Alberta	British Columbia	Manitoba	New Brunswick	Newfoundland
Crestwood CC, Edmonton Skip: Hazel Jamison; Third: Gail Lee; Second: Jackie Spencer; Lead: June Coyle	Cranbrook Ladies CC, Cranbrook Skip: Myrtle Fashoway; Third: Anne McLay; Second: Fernande Hawkes; Lead: Eleanor Campbell	Brandon CC, Brandon Skip: Mabel Mitchell; Third: Shirley Bray; Second: Mildred Murray; Lead: June Clark	St. Andrews CC, Saint John Skip: Barbara Likely; Third: Anita McInerney; Second: Willa Archibald; Lead: Mildred Patterson	St. John's CC, St. John's Skip: Jeanette Blair; Third: Christine Mills; Second: Elsie May; Lead: Ruth Carter
Nova Scotia	Ontario	Prince Edward Island	Quebec	Saskatchewan
Mayflower CC, Halifax Skip: Shirley Robertson; Third: Doris Anthony; Second: Donna Fleming; Lead: Hazel Belliveau	Dryden CC, Dryden Skip: Peggy Wherrett; Third: Shirley Lake; Second: Doreen McKay; Lead: Audrey Tew	Charlottetown CC, Charlottetown Skip: Gladys Carruthers; Third: Anita Cudmore; Second: Wanda Robinson; Lead: Audrey MacKinnon	Hudson-Whitlock G&CC, Hudson Heights Skip: Peggy Bradshaw; Third: Frances Bedbrook; Second: Margaret Larsen; Lead: Lillian Connolly	Delisle CC, Delisle Skip: Barbara MacNevin; Third: Fay Coben; Second: Florence Hill; Lead: Avis Carr

== Map of teams ==
Provincial Winners

== Round robin standings ==
Final Round Robin standings

Key
Teams to Tiebreaker

Province	Skip	W	L	PF	PA
Alberta	Hazel Jamison	7	2	93	51
British Columbia	Myrtle Fashoway	7	2	79	49
Manitoba	Mabel Mitchell	6	3	79	71
Saskatchewan	Barbara MacNevin	6	3	61	56
Nova Scotia	Shirley Robertson	4	5	71	62
New Brunswick	Barbara Likely	4	5	58	73
Ontario	Peggy Wherrett	3	6	63	80
Newfoundland	Jeanette Blair	3	6	59	79
Prince Edward Island	Gladys Carruthers	3	6	61	85
Quebec	Peggy Bradshaw	2	7	58	76

== Round robin results ==
All draw times are listed in Central Standard Time (UTC−06:00).

=== Draw 1 ===
Monday, February 26, 2:30 pm

Team	1	2	3	4	5	6	7	8	9	10	Final
Quebec (Bradshaw)	0	1	0	1	0	0	0	0	0	X	2
New Brunswick (Likely)	0	0	3	0	1	2	1	1	1	X	9

Team	1	2	3	4	5	6	7	8	9	10	Final
Saskatchewan (MacNevin)	2	0	0	4	0	0	0	3	1	X	10
Newfoundland (Blair)	0	0	0	0	2	1	0	0	0	X	3

Team	1	2	3	4	5	6	7	8	9	10	Final
British Columbia (Fashoway)	2	1	0	3	0	4	1	2	0	X	13
Ontario (Wherrett)	0	0	2	0	1	0	0	0	1	X	4

Team	1	2	3	4	5	6	7	8	9	10	Final
Manitoba (Mitchell)	2	0	4	0	1	0	1	2	2	X	12
Prince Edward Island (Carruthers)	0	1	0	1	0	2	0	0	0	X	4

Team	1	2	3	4	5	6	7	8	9	10	11	Final
Alberta (Jamison)	1	2	0	3	0	0	2	1	0	0	1	10
Nova Scotia (Robertson)	0	0	3	0	1	2	0	0	1	2	0	9

=== Draw 2 ===
Monday, February 26, 8:00 pm

Team	1	2	3	4	5	6	7	8	9	10	Final
Newfoundland (Blair)	1	3	0	1	2	0	1	1	3	X	12
New Brunswick (Likely)	0	0	1	0	0	1	0	0	0	X	2

Team	1	2	3	4	5	6	7	8	9	10	Final
Manitoba (Mitchell)	0	0	2	1	0	1	0	1	0	X	5
Quebec (Bradshaw)	2	3	0	0	3	0	1	0	4	X	13

Team	1	2	3	4	5	6	7	8	9	10	Final
Nova Scotia (Robertson)	3	2	0	3	0	5	0	0	2	0	15
Ontario (Wherrett)	0	0	1	0	1	0	2	0	0	0	4

Team	1	2	3	4	5	6	7	8	9	10	Final
Saskatchewan (MacNevin)	0	1	3	0	1	1	0	3	0	X	9
British Columbia (Fashoway)	1	0	0	1	0	0	1	0	1	X	4

Team	1	2	3	4	5	6	7	8	9	10	Final
Alberta (Jamison)	2	0	0	0	0	0	2	0	2	0	6
Prince Edward Island (Carruthers)	0	1	0	2	1	2	0	1	0	1	8

=== Draw 3 ===
Tuesday, February 27, 9:30 am

Team	1	2	3	4	5	6	7	8	9	10	Final
Saskatchewan (MacNevin)	0	1	0	0	4	0	3	0	0	X	8
Nova Scotia (Robertson)	0	0	0	1	0	0	0	1	0	X	2

Team	1	2	3	4	5	6	7	8	9	10	Final
Quebec (Bradshaw)	0	0	1	0	4	1	0	2	0	0	8
Ontario (Wherrett)	3	2	0	2	0	0	2	0	2	1	12

Team	1	2	3	4	5	6	7	8	9	10	Final
Manitoba (Mitchell)	0	1	4	1	0	4	0	2	0	X	12
Newfoundland (Blair)	1	0	0	0	1	0	5	0	1	X	8

Team	1	2	3	4	5	6	7	8	9	10	Final
British Columbia (Fashoway)	3	0	2	0	0	0	0	3	2	X	10
Prince Edward Island (Carruthers)	0	1	0	1	1	1	1	0	0	X	5

Team	1	2	3	4	5	6	7	8	9	10	Final
Alberta (Jamison)	3	2	0	0	1	1	2	1	2	X	12
New Brunswick (Likely)	0	0	2	3	0	0	0	0	0	X	5

=== Draw 4 ===
Tuesday, February 27, 8:00 pm

Team	1	2	3	4	5	6	7	8	9	10	Final
Saskatchewan (MacNevin)	0	0	1	0	0	1	0	0	X	X	2
Alberta (Jamison)	3	1	0	5	2	0	3	2	X	X	16

Team	1	2	3	4	5	6	7	8	9	10	Final
Quebec (Bradshaw)	1	0	1	0	0	4	0	0	3	2	11
Prince Edward Island (Carruthers)	0	4	0	2	1	0	1	1	0	0	9

Team	1	2	3	4	5	6	7	8	9	10	11	Final
British Columbia (Fashoway)	1	0	2	0	1	0	0	1	0	0	5	10
Newfoundland (Blair)	0	1	0	1	0	0	1	0	1	1	0	5

Team	1	2	3	4	5	6	7	8	9	10	Final
Ontario (Wherrett)	0	0	3	0	1	0	0	0	0	1	5
New Brunswick (Likely)	1	1	0	1	0	1	2	3	1	0	10

Team	1	2	3	4	5	6	7	8	9	10	Final
Manitoba (Mitchell)	1	2	0	1	1	0	1	2	2	1	11
Nova Scotia (Robertson)	0	0	1	0	0	4	0	0	0	0	5

=== Draw 5 ===
Wednesday, February 28, 9:30 am

Team	1	2	3	4	5	6	7	8	9	10	Final
Newfoundland (Blair)	0	1	3	0	0	0	0	1	0	X	5
Ontario (Wherrett)	4	0	0	3	1	1	3	0	2	X	14

Team	1	2	3	4	5	6	7	8	9	10	11	Final
British Columbia (Fashoway)	0	1	1	1	0	1	0	1	0	0	2	7
Nova Scotia (Robertson)	0	0	0	0	1	0	2	0	1	1	0	5

Team	1	2	3	4	5	6	7	8	9	10	Final
Saskatchewan (MacNevin)	0	0	0	2	1	2	1	1	0	X	7
Quebec (Bradshaw)	2	1	1	0	0	0	0	0	1	X	5

Team	1	2	3	4	5	6	7	8	9	10	Final
Prince Edward Island (Carruthers)	1	4	2	0	3	0	0	1	0	1	12
New Brunswick (Likely)	0	0	0	1	0	5	1	0	1	0	8

Team	1	2	3	4	5	6	7	8	9	10	11	Final
Manitoba (Mitchell)	2	0	0	1	2	0	1	0	0	3	1	10
Alberta (Jamison)	0	4	0	0	0	3	0	1	1	0	0	9

=== Draw 6 ===
Wednesday, February 28, 2:30 pm

Team	1	2	3	4	5	6	7	8	9	10	Final
British Columbia (Fashoway)	3	1	2	3	0	1	1	0	X	X	11
Quebec (Bradshaw)	0	0	0	0	1	0	0	1	X	X	2

Team	1	2	3	4	5	6	7	8	9	10	Final
Nova Scotia (Robertson)	2	0	1	0	2	0	1	1	3	X	10
New Brunswick (Likely)	0	1	0	1	0	0	0	0	0	X	2

Team	1	2	3	4	5	6	7	8	9	10	Final
Saskatchewan (MacNevin)	0	1	0	0	1	1	0	2	0	1	6
Manitoba (Mitchell)	2	0	2	2	0	0	1	0	1	0	8

Team	1	2	3	4	5	6	7	8	9	10	Final
Newfoundland (Blair)	2	3	0	2	3	0	0	1	1	X	12
Prince Edward Island (Carruthers)	0	0	2	0	0	1	2	0	0	X	5

Team	1	2	3	4	5	6	7	8	9	10	Final
Alberta (Jamison)	3	2	2	0	0	1	2	2	X	X	12
Ontario (Wherrett)	0	0	0	1	1	0	0	0	X	X	2

=== Draw 7 ===
Wednesday, February 28, 8:00 pm

Team	1	2	3	4	5	6	7	8	9	10	Final
British Columbia (Fashoway)	0	3	0	1	2	1	0	1	1	X	9
New Brunswick (Likely)	2	0	1	0	0	0	1	0	0	X	4

Team	1	2	3	4	5	6	7	8	9	10	Final
Alberta (Jamison)	1	2	0	1	0	1	1	1	3	X	10
Newfoundland (Blair)	0	0	1	0	1	0	0	0	0	X	2

Team	1	2	3	4	5	6	7	8	9	10	Final
Quebec (Bradshaw)	1	1	0	1	0	0	1	0	2	X	6
Nova Scotia (Robertson)	0	0	2	0	2	2	0	1	0	X	7

Team	1	2	3	4	5	6	7	8	9	10	Final
Saskatchewan (MacNevin)	0	2	2	0	0	1	0	0	2	1	8
Prince Edward Island (Carruthers)	1	0	0	1	2	0	1	2	0	0	7

Team	1	2	3	4	5	6	7	8	9	10	11	Final
Manitoba (Mitchell)	3	0	0	2	0	0	0	2	0	0	1	8
Ontario (Wherrett)	0	2	1	0	1	0	1	0	1	1	0	7

=== Draw 8 ===
Thursday, February 29, 9:30 am

Team	1	2	3	4	5	6	7	8	9	10	Final
Prince Edward Island (Carruthers)	0	0	1	0	1	0	0	0	X	X	2
Ontario (Wherrett)	1	1	0	2	0	2	2	2	X	X	10

Team	1	2	3	4	5	6	7	8	9	10	Final
Nova Scotia (Robertson)	2	1	4	1	1	0	0	0	1	X	10
Newfoundland (Blair)	0	0	0	0	0	2	0	3	0	X	5

Team	1	2	3	4	5	6	7	8	9	10	Final
Quebec (Bradshaw)	1	0	1	0	1	0	1	0	1	X	5
Alberta (Jamison)	0	5	0	1	0	2	0	1	0	X	9

Team	1	2	3	4	5	6	7	8	9	10	Final
Saskatchewan (MacNevin)	0	2	0	0	1	0	0	0	1	0	4
New Brunswick (Likely)	1	0	1	0	0	0	1	2	0	1	6

Team	1	2	3	4	5	6	7	8	9	10	Final
Manitoba (Mitchell)	0	0	1	2	2	1	0	0	0	0	6
British Columbia (Fashoway)	1	1	0	0	0	0	1	2	1	1	7

=== Draw 9 ===
Thursday, February 29, 8:00 pm

Team	1	2	3	4	5	6	7	8	9	10	Final
Quebec (Bradshaw)	2	0	1	0	1	0	2	0	0	0	6
Newfoundland (Blair)	0	1	0	0	0	1	0	3	1	1	7

Team	1	2	3	4	5	6	7	8	9	10	Final
Manitoba (Mitchell)	0	0	3	0	1	3	0	0	0	0	7
New Brunswick (Likely)	1	2	0	2	0	0	1	2	1	3	12

Team	1	2	3	4	5	6	7	8	9	10	Final
Saskatchewan (MacNevin)	0	2	1	0	0	1	1	1	1	X	7
Ontario (Wherrett)	1	0	0	3	1	0	0	0	0	X	5

Team	1	2	3	4	5	6	7	8	9	10	Final
Nova Scotia (Robertson)	1	0	1	0	0	1	2	2	1	0	8
Prince Edward Island (Carruthers)	0	2	0	4	1	0	0	0	0	2	9

Team	1	2	3	4	5	6	7	8	9	10	Final
British Columbia (Fashoway)	1	0	2	0	2	2	0	1	0	0	8
Alberta (Jamison)	0	1	0	1	0	0	5	0	1	1	9

== Tiebreaker ==
Friday, March 1, 9:30 am

Team	1	2	3	4	5	6	7	8	9	10	Final
British Columbia (Fashoway)	0	0	0	2	0	0	1	0	1	X	4
Alberta (Jamison)	1	1	1	0	5	1	0	1	0	X	11
