= 1966 Diamond D Championship =

Canadian women's curling championship

1966 Diamond "D" Championship
- Host city: North Vancouver, British Columbia
- Arena: Capilano Winter Club
- Dates: February 28 – March 3
- Winner: Alberta
- Curling club: Crestwood CC, Edmonton
- Skip: Gail Lee
- Third: Hazel Jamison
- Second: Sharon Harrington
- Lead: June Coyle

The 1966 Diamond "D" Championship the Canadian women's curling championship was held from February 28 to March 3, 1966 at the Capilano Winter Club in North Vancouver, British Columbia.

Team Alberta, who was skipped by Gail Lee won the event by finishing round robin play unbeaten with a 9–0 record. This was Alberta's first championship. This was also the first time since 1962 in which a rink finished unbeaten and the third time overall.

Alberta also tied a record for most points stolen in one end in their Draw 5 matchup with Quebec as Alberta scored six in the first end en route to a 14-6 win.

This tournament would tie the record set in the inaugural 1961 event for the most extra ends in one tournament with four. This record would be broken in 1968.

== Teams ==
The teams are listed as follows:

Alberta	British Columbia	Manitoba	New Brunswick	Newfoundland
Crestwood CC, Edmonton Skip: Gail Lee; Third: Hazel Jamison; Second: Sharon Harrington; Lead: June Coyle	Vancouver CC, Vancouver Skip: Margaret Cooke; Third: Eva Glover; Second: Ruth Hebert; Lead: Marion Ellison	Dauphin CC, Dauphin Skip: Joyce Beek; Third: Ruth McMillan; Second: Margaret Davis; Lead: Gayle White	Bathurst CC, Bathurst Skip: Shirley Pilson; Third: Anne Orser; Second: Helen Gammon; Lead: Geraldine Lenihan	Grand Falls CC, Grand Falls Skip: Violet Pike; Third: Gladys Clarke; Second: Caroline Ball; Lead: Joanne Goodyear
Nova Scotia	Ontario	Prince Edward Island	Quebec	Saskatchewan
Halifax Ladies CC, Halifax Skip: Irene Snow; Third: Jean Nickerson; Second: Helen Duffus; Lead: Ruth Lewis	Kenora CC, Kenora Skip: June Shaw; Third: Shirley Wiebe; Second: Dorothy Holmgren; Lead: Joan LeCain	RCAF Summerside CC, Summerside Skip: Kay Hoare; Third: Lila Tucker; Second: Diane Stark; Lead: Muriel Thomas	Port Alfred CC, Port-Alfred Skip: Nicole Janelle; Third: Roma Jean; Second: Paulette Janelle; Lead: Maurie Gagnon	Delisle CC, Delisle Skip: Barbara MacNevin; Third: Fay Coben; Second: Florence Hill; Lead: Avis Carr

== Map of teams ==
Provincial Winners

== Round robin standings ==
Final Round Robin standings

Key
Diamond D champion

Province	Skip	W	L	PF	PA
Alberta	Gail Lee	9	0	93	52
Saskatchewan	Barbara MacNevin	7	2	85	58
British Columbia	Margaret Cooke	6	3	84	80
Ontario	June Shaw	5	4	79	75
Quebec	Nicole Janelle	5	4	74	76
Manitoba	Joyce Beek	4	5	79	68
Nova Scotia	Irene Snow	3	6	67	84
Newfoundland	Violet Pike	2	7	68	81
Prince Edward Island	Kay Hoare	2	7	51	92
New Brunswick	Shirley Pilson	2	7	71	85

== Round robin results ==
All draw times are listed in Pacific Standard Time (UTC−08:00).

=== Draw 1 ===
Monday, February 28, 2:30 pm

Team	1	2	3	4	5	6	7	8	9	10	Final
Manitoba (Beek)	1	0	0	0	2	0	1	1	0	0	5
Alberta (Lee)	0	1	1	1	0	1	0	0	1	1	6

Team	1	2	3	4	5	6	7	8	9	10	Final
Prince Edward Island (Hoare)	0	1	0	0	1	0	1	1	0	0	4
Ontario (Shaw)	0	0	1	1	0	1	0	0	3	3	9

Team	1	2	3	4	5	6	7	8	9	10	Final
Saskatchewan (MacNevin)	3	0	0	2	0	4	0	0	1	0	10
Newfoundland (Pike)	0	1	0	0	3	0	0	2	0	1	7

Team	1	2	3	4	5	6	7	8	9	10	Final
New Brunswick (Pilson)	3	0	0	0	1	0	3	0	0	3	10
Nova Scotia (Snow)	0	2	2	1	0	1	0	3	2	0	11

Team	1	2	3	4	5	6	7	8	9	10	11	Final
British Columbia (Cooke)	3	1	0	0	0	1	0	4	0	0	1	10
Quebec (Janelle)	0	0	2	1	1	0	2	0	2	1	0	9

=== Draw 2 ===
Monday, February 28, 8:00 pm

Team	1	2	3	4	5	6	7	8	9	10	Final
Quebec (Janelle)	1	0	0	0	1	0	3	1	0	0	6
Nova Scotia (Snow)	0	2	3	2	0	2	0	0	1	1	11

Team	1	2	3	4	5	6	7	8	9	10	Final
Saskatchewan (MacNevin)	0	1	0	2	2	0	0	0	4	0	9
New Brunswick (Pilson)	1	0	2	0	0	1	1	1	0	1	7

Team	1	2	3	4	5	6	7	8	9	10	Final
Ontario (Shaw)	1	0	2	0	0	1	0	0	1	0	5
Alberta (Lee)	0	3	0	1	1	0	3	1	0	1	10

Team	1	2	3	4	5	6	7	8	9	10	Final
British Columbia (Cooke)	1	0	0	2	1	0	4	0	1	1	10
Manitoba (Beek)	0	4	1	0	0	1	0	1	0	0	7

Team	1	2	3	4	5	6	7	8	9	10	Final
Prince Edward Island (Hoare)	0	0	0	2	0	0	0	0	0	X	2
Newfoundland (Pike)	2	1	2	0	1	1	2	1	2	X	12

=== Draw 3 ===
Tuesday, March 1, 9:00 am

Team	1	2	3	4	5	6	7	8	9	10	Final
British Columbia (Cooke)	1	4	0	1	0	4	0	0	0	4	14
Ontario (Shaw)	0	0	1	0	1	0	5	1	1	0	9

Team	1	2	3	4	5	6	7	8	9	10	Final
Manitoba (Beek)	0	1	1	0	2	2	1	0	1	2	10
Newfoundland (Pike)	1	0	0	1	0	0	0	2	0	0	4

Team	1	2	3	4	5	6	7	8	9	10	Final
Prince Edward Island (Hoare)	2	0	2	0	0	1	2	0	1	2	10
Nova Scotia (Snow)	0	3	0	1	2	0	0	1	0	0	7

Team	1	2	3	4	5	6	7	8	9	10	Final
New Brunswick (Pilson)	0	0	0	3	1	0	0	3	0	0	7
Alberta (Lee)	2	1	2	0	0	1	3	0	0	1	10

Team	1	2	3	4	5	6	7	8	9	10	Final
Saskatchewan (MacNevin)	0	0	2	1	0	0	1	0	1	X	5
Quebec (Janelle)	2	3	0	0	1	2	0	1	0	X	9

=== Draw 4 ===
Tuesday, March 1, 8:00 pm

Team	1	2	3	4	5	6	7	8	9	10	Final
Alberta (Lee)	1	0	0	3	1	0	0	1	0	1	7
Nova Scotia (Snow)	0	2	1	0	0	1	1	0	1	0	6

Team	1	2	3	4	5	6	7	8	9	10	Final
Manitoba (Beek)	1	0	1	2	0	2	1	0	0	0	7
Quebec (Janelle)	0	4	0	0	2	0	0	1	1	1	9

Team	1	2	3	4	5	6	7	8	9	10	Final
New Brunswick (Pilson)	1	0	0	1	0	1	0	1	3	0	7
Newfoundland (Pike)	0	1	1	0	3	0	2	0	0	1	8

Team	1	2	3	4	5	6	7	8	9	10	11	Final
Saskatchewan (MacNevin)	1	0	1	2	0	2	0	0	1	0	1	8
Ontario (Shaw)	0	1	0	0	1	0	0	2	0	3	0	7

Team	1	2	3	4	5	6	7	8	9	10	Final
British Columbia (Cooke)	1	1	1	1	0	1	0	4	0	X	9
Prince Edward Island (Hoare)	0	0	0	0	1	0	3	0	2	X	6

=== Draw 5 ===
Wednesday, March 2, 9:00 am

Team	1	2	3	4	5	6	7	8	9	10	Final
Newfoundland (Pike)	0	0	1	0	0	3	1	0	1	2	8
Nova Scotia (Snow)	3	1	0	1	1	0	0	3	0	0	9

Team	1	2	3	4	5	6	7	8	9	10	Final
Quebec (Janelle)	0	0	0	1	1	1	2	0	0	1	6
Alberta (Lee)	6	1	2	0	0	0	0	4	1	0	14

Team	1	2	3	4	5	6	7	8	9	10	Final
Manitoba (Beek)	1	2	0	0	3	0	1	0	0	1	8
Ontario (Shaw)	0	0	2	1	0	1	0	2	4	0	10

Team	1	2	3	4	5	6	7	8	9	10	Final
Saskatchewan (MacNevin)	2	2	2	2	0	3	0	1	1	X	13
Prince Edward Island (Hoare)	0	0	0	0	2	0	1	0	0	X	3

Team	1	2	3	4	5	6	7	8	9	10	Final
British Columbia (Cooke)	0	1	1	1	0	0	3	2	0	0	8
New Brunswick (Pilson)	2	0	0	0	1	2	0	0	1	3	9

=== Draw 6 ===
Wednesday, March 2, 2:30 pm

Team	1	2	3	4	5	6	7	8	9	10	Final
Ontario (Shaw)	0	2	1	0	2	0	0	2	2	2	11
Nova Scotia (Snow)	3	0	0	1	0	1	1	0	0	0	6

Team	1	2	3	4	5	6	7	8	9	10	Final
Quebec (Janelle)	1	0	1	0	2	1	0	2	0	1	8
Newfoundland (Pike)	0	1	0	2	0	0	2	0	2	0	7

Team	1	2	3	4	5	6	7	8	9	10	Final
British Columbia (Cooke)	0	1	0	1	0	0	1	0	1	X	4
Saskatchewan (MacNevin)	1	0	1	0	4	3	0	4	0	X	13

Team	1	2	3	4	5	6	7	8	9	10	Final
Alberta (Lee)	1	2	1	0	4	4	0	0	1	X	13
Prince Edward Island (Hoare)	0	0	0	1	0	0	1	1	0	X	3

Team	1	2	3	4	5	6	7	8	9	10	Final
Manitoba (Beek)	1	0	2	0	3	1	1	1	0	2	11
New Brunswick (Pilson)	0	1	0	3	0	0	0	0	4	0	8

=== Draw 7 ===
Wednesday, March 2, 8:00 pm

Team	1	2	3	4	5	6	7	8	9	10	Final
Prince Edward Island (Hoare)	1	0	2	0	0	1	1	1	0	0	6
Quebec (Janelle)	0	3	0	3	1	0	0	0	1	3	11

Team	1	2	3	4	5	6	7	8	9	10	Final
Saskatchewan (MacNevin)	0	2	0	2	0	0	1	0	1	0	6
Alberta (Lee)	2	0	1	0	2	0	0	2	0	1	8

Team	1	2	3	4	5	6	7	8	9	10	Final
New Brunswick (Pilson)	1	1	0	1	1	0	3	3	0	0	10
Ontario (Shaw)	0	0	1	0	0	1	0	0	1	4	7

Team	1	2	3	4	5	6	7	8	9	10	11	Final
British Columbia (Cooke)	0	0	0	1	1	0	0	5	2	0	2	11
Newfoundland (Pike)	1	1	1	0	0	4	1	0	0	1	0	9

Team	1	2	3	4	5	6	7	8	9	10	Final
Manitoba (Beek)	1	1	0	3	1	0	4	4	0	X	14
Nova Scotia (Snow)	0	0	1	0	0	1	0	0	2	X	4

=== Draw 8 ===
Thursday, March 3, 9:00 am

Team	1	2	3	4	5	6	7	8	9	10	Final
Newfoundland (Pike)	1	0	0	0	0	1	0	0	2	0	4
Alberta (Lee)	0	1	0	4	1	0	2	3	0	3	14

Team	1	2	3	4	5	6	7	8	9	10	Final
British Columbia (Cooke)	0	2	3	1	1	0	0	0	1	0	8
Nova Scotia (Snow)	1	0	0	0	0	1	1	1	0	3	7

Team	1	2	3	4	5	6	7	8	9	10	Final
Saskatchewan (MacNevin)	1	0	1	0	3	0	2	0	3	1	11
Manitoba (Beek)	0	3	0	2	0	1	0	1	0	0	7

Team	1	2	3	4	5	6	7	8	9	10	Final
New Brunswick (Pilson)	3	0	0	0	2	0	3	0	0	0	8
Prince Edward Island (Hoare)	0	1	3	2	0	1	0	1	2	1	11

Team	1	2	3	4	5	6	7	8	9	10	Final
Ontario (Shaw)	1	1	0	3	0	3	0	0	1	2	11
Quebec (Janelle)	0	0	3	0	1	0	1	1	0	0	6

=== Draw 9 ===
Thursday, March 3, 8:00 pm

Team	1	2	3	4	5	6	7	8	9	10	Final
Saskatchewan (MacNevin)	1	0	1	1	1	0	0	2	2	2	10
Nova Scotia (Snow)	0	2	0	0	0	1	3	0	0	0	6

Team	1	2	3	4	5	6	7	8	9	10	Final
New Brunswick (Pilson)	0	1	1	0	0	0	0	1	1	1	5
Quebec (Janelle)	1	0	0	5	1	2	1	0	0	0	10

Team	1	2	3	4	5	6	7	8	9	10	11	Final
British Columbia (Cooke)	1	0	2	0	2	0	1	0	3	1	0	10
Alberta (Lee)	0	1	0	4	0	2	0	3	0	0	1	11

Team	1	2	3	4	5	6	7	8	9	10	Final
Ontario (Shaw)	0	2	1	0	0	2	2	1	2	0	10
Newfoundland (Pike)	1	0	0	4	2	0	0	0	0	2	9

Team	1	2	3	4	5	6	7	8	9	10	Final
Manitoba (Beek)	1	0	1	0	4	1	0	2	1	0	10
Prince Edward Island (Hoare)	0	1	0	2	0	0	1	0	0	2	6
