= 2026 Alberta Women's Curling Championship =

Canadian provincial women's curling championship

2026 RME New Holland Alberta Women's Summit of Champions Presented by Sentinel Storage
- Host city: Okotoks, Alberta
- Arena: The Murray Arena
- Dates: January 5–11
- Winner: Team Sturmay
- Curling club: Saville Community SC, Edmonton
- Skip: Selena Sturmay
- Third: Danielle Schmiemann
- Second: Dezaray Hawes
- Lead: Paige Papley
- Coach: Ted Appelman
- Finalist: Serena Gray-Withers

The 2026 RME New Holland Alberta Women's Summit of Champions presented by Sentinel Storage, the provincial women's curling championship for Alberta, was held from January 5 to 11 at The Murray Arena in Okotoks, Alberta. The winning Selena Sturmay rink represented Alberta at the 2026 Scotties Tournament of Hearts in Mississauga, Ontario. The event was held in conjunction with the 2026 Alberta Men's Curling Championship, the provincial men's championship.

Having finished third on the CTRS standings for the 2024–25 season, defending champions Team Kayla Skrlik earned an automatic berth at the national championship. This meant Alberta would qualify two teams for the Scotties.

== Qualification Process ==
| Qualification method | Berths | Qualifying teams |
|---|---|---|
| WCT Leaders | 3 | Serena Gray-Withers; Selena Sturmay; Gracelyn Richards |
| Alberta Curling Tour Points | 2 | Myla Plett; Krysta Hilker |
| Grande Prairie Qualifier | 2 | Michelle Hartwell; Leslie Hammond |
| Coaldale Granite Qualifier | 3 | Lisa Miller; Keelie Duncan; Amanda Sluchinski |
| Last Chance Red Deer Qualifier | 2 | Emma DeSchiffart; Shianna Lind |

== Teams ==
The teams are listed as follows:

| Skip | Third | Second | Lead | Alternate | Coach | Club(s) |
|---|---|---|---|---|---|---|
| Emma DeSchiffart | Abby Desormeau | Bethany Evans | Sarah Yarmuch | | Alison Thiessen | Saville Community SC, Edmonton |
| Ava Koe (Fourth) | Keelie Duncan (Skip) | Elizabeth Morgan | Carley Hardie | Kate Ector | Heather Rogers | The Glencoe Club, Calgary |
| Serena Gray-Withers | Catherine Clifford | Lindsey Burgess | Zoe Cinnamon | Atina Ford-Johnston | Lori Olson | Saville Community SC, Edmonton |
| Leslie Hammond | Emily Graham | Emily Deibert | Rachel Clark | | Jules Owchar | St. Albert CC, St. Albert |
| Michelle Hartwell | Ocean Pletz | Heather Steele | Jolene Tym | Deena Benoit | | Thistle CC, Edmonton |
| Krysta Hilker | Karynn Flory | Jamie Scott | Sydney Libbus | | Clair Murray | Ellerslie CC, Edmonton |
| Shianna Lind | Irelande McMahon | Kayleigh Shannon | Megan Chateauvert | | Chris Lind | Innisfail CC, Innisfail |
| Lisa Miller | Cindy Westgard | Erica Wiese | Ashley Kalk | | | Thistle CC, Edmonton; Sherwood Park CC, Sherwood Park |
| Myla Plett | Alyssa Nedohin | Chloe Fediuk | Allie Iskiw | | David Nedohin; Blair Lenton | Saville Community SC, Edmonton; Sherwood Park CC, Sherwood Park |
| Gracelyn Richards | Emma Yarmuch | Sophia Ryhorchuk | Rachel Jacques | Amy Wheatcroft | Jessica Amundson | Saville Community SC, Edmonton |
| Amanda Sluchinski | Kate Goodhelpsen | Anna Munroe | Joanne Tarvit | | | Crestwood CC, Edmonton |
| Selena Sturmay | Danielle Schmiemann | Dezaray Hawes | Paige Papley | | Ted Appelman | Saville Community SC, Edmonton |

== Knockout Brackets ==
=== A Event ===
First Knockout | Qualifier 1
Serena Gray-Withers | 11
Keelie Duncan | 3 | Shianna Lind | 4
Shianna Lind | 8 | Serena Gray-Withers | 8
Myla Plett | 3
Myla Plett | 9
Krysta Hilker | 10 | Krysta Hilker | 6
Michelle Hartwell | 3 | Serena Gray-Withers | 9
Selena Sturmay | 7
Selena Sturmay | 7
Amanda Sluchinski | 6 | Leslie Hammond | 1
Leslie Hammond | 8 | Selena Sturmay | 8
Gracelyn Richards | 2
Gracelyn Richards | 8
Emma DeSchiffart | 11 | Emma DeSchiffart | 3
Lisa Miller | 4

=== B Event ===
Second Knockout | Qualifier 2
Keelie Duncan | 5
Krysta Hilker | 10
Krysta Hilker | 7
Gracelyn Richards | 9
Gracelyn Richards | 2
Myla Plett | 7
Lisa Miller | 9
Leslie Hammond | 4
Lisa Miller | 5
Myla Plett | 8
Myla Plett | 6
Selena Sturmay | 9
Amanda Sluchinski | 10
Emma DeSchiffart | 5
Amanda Sluchinski | 6
Shianna Lind | 5
Michelle Hartwell | 6
Shianna Lind | 7
Amanda Sluchinski | 5
Selena Sturmay | 8

=== C Event ===
Third Knockout | Qualifier 3
Amanda Sluchinski | 9
Keelie Duncan | 5 | Leslie Hammond | 7
Leslie Hammond | 7 | Amanda Sluchinski | 8
Shianna Lind | 7
Shianna Lind | 6
Gracelyn Richards | 5

Third Knockout | Qualifier 4
Emma DeSchiffart | 8
Myla Plett | 8
Krysta Hilker | 4
Emma DeSchiffart | 9 | Emma DeSchiffart | 10
Lisa Miller | 1
Michelle Hartwell | 7
Lisa Miller | 8

== Knockout Results ==
All draw times are listed in Mountain Time (UTC-07:00).

=== Draw 1 ===
Monday, January 5, 6:30 pm

| Sheet A | 1 | 2 | 3 | 4 | 5 | 6 | 7 | 8 | 9 | 10 | Final |
|---|---|---|---|---|---|---|---|---|---|---|---|
| Keelie Duncan | 0 | 1 | 0 | 2 | 0 | 0 | 0 | 0 | X | X | 3 |
| Shianna Lind 🔨 | 0 | 0 | 1 | 0 | 2 | 1 | 2 | 2 | X | X | 8 |

| Sheet C | 1 | 2 | 3 | 4 | 5 | 6 | 7 | 8 | 9 | 10 | Final |
|---|---|---|---|---|---|---|---|---|---|---|---|
| Krysta Hilker | 0 | 2 | 0 | 1 | 2 | 0 | 1 | 4 | X | X | 10 |
| Michelle Hartwell 🔨 | 1 | 0 | 1 | 0 | 0 | 1 | 0 | 0 | X | X | 3 |

=== Draw 2 ===
Tuesday, January 6, 9:00 am

| Sheet B | 1 | 2 | 3 | 4 | 5 | 6 | 7 | 8 | 9 | 10 | Final |
|---|---|---|---|---|---|---|---|---|---|---|---|
| Amanda Sluchinski 🔨 | 1 | 0 | 3 | 0 | 1 | 0 | 0 | 0 | 1 | 0 | 6 |
| Leslie Hammond | 0 | 1 | 0 | 2 | 0 | 0 | 0 | 1 | 0 | 4 | 8 |

| Sheet D | 1 | 2 | 3 | 4 | 5 | 6 | 7 | 8 | 9 | 10 | Final |
|---|---|---|---|---|---|---|---|---|---|---|---|
| Emma DeSchiffart | 0 | 0 | 1 | 1 | 2 | 0 | 0 | 4 | 3 | X | 11 |
| Lisa Miller 🔨 | 1 | 1 | 0 | 0 | 0 | 1 | 1 | 0 | 0 | X | 4 |

=== Draw 3 ===
Tuesday, January 6, 1:30 pm

| Sheet A | 1 | 2 | 3 | 4 | 5 | 6 | 7 | 8 | 9 | 10 | Final |
|---|---|---|---|---|---|---|---|---|---|---|---|
| Myla Plett | 0 | 0 | 2 | 0 | 3 | 0 | 2 | 1 | 0 | 1 | 9 |
| Krysta Hilker 🔨 | 0 | 1 | 0 | 2 | 0 | 2 | 0 | 0 | 1 | 0 | 6 |

| Sheet C | 1 | 2 | 3 | 4 | 5 | 6 | 7 | 8 | 9 | 10 | Final |
|---|---|---|---|---|---|---|---|---|---|---|---|
| Serena Gray-Withers | 3 | 1 | 0 | 0 | 2 | 0 | 0 | 2 | 3 | X | 11 |
| Shianna Lind 🔨 | 0 | 0 | 2 | 1 | 0 | 1 | 0 | 0 | 0 | X | 4 |

=== Draw 4 ===
Tuesday, January 6, 6:30 pm

| Sheet B | 1 | 2 | 3 | 4 | 5 | 6 | 7 | 8 | 9 | 10 | Final |
|---|---|---|---|---|---|---|---|---|---|---|---|
| Gracelyn Richards 🔨 | 0 | 2 | 3 | 0 | 1 | 2 | 0 | X | X | X | 8 |
| Emma DeSchiffart | 0 | 0 | 0 | 1 | 0 | 0 | 2 | X | X | X | 3 |

| Sheet D | 1 | 2 | 3 | 4 | 5 | 6 | 7 | 8 | 9 | 10 | Final |
|---|---|---|---|---|---|---|---|---|---|---|---|
| Selena Sturmay | 1 | 1 | 0 | 1 | 0 | 2 | 2 | X | X | X | 7 |
| Leslie Hammond 🔨 | 0 | 0 | 0 | 0 | 1 | 0 | 0 | X | X | X | 1 |

=== Draw 5 ===
Wednesday, January 7, 9:00 am

| Sheet C | 1 | 2 | 3 | 4 | 5 | 6 | 7 | 8 | 9 | 10 | Final |
|---|---|---|---|---|---|---|---|---|---|---|---|
| Lisa Miller 🔨 | 0 | 0 | 2 | 2 | 0 | 2 | 0 | 1 | 2 | X | 9 |
| Leslie Hammond | 1 | 1 | 0 | 0 | 1 | 0 | 1 | 0 | 0 | X | 4 |

| Sheet D | 1 | 2 | 3 | 4 | 5 | 6 | 7 | 8 | 9 | 10 | Final |
|---|---|---|---|---|---|---|---|---|---|---|---|
| Keelie Duncan | 0 | 1 | 0 | 0 | 1 | 0 | 0 | 3 | X | X | 5 |
| Krysta Hilker 🔨 | 1 | 0 | 3 | 4 | 0 | 1 | 1 | 0 | X | X | 10 |

=== Draw 6 ===
Wednesday, January 7, 1:30 pm

| Sheet C | 1 | 2 | 3 | 4 | 5 | 6 | 7 | 8 | 9 | 10 | Final |
|---|---|---|---|---|---|---|---|---|---|---|---|
| Amanda Sluchinski | 2 | 0 | 1 | 0 | 0 | 1 | 0 | 4 | 2 | X | 10 |
| Emma DeSchiffart 🔨 | 0 | 2 | 0 | 1 | 1 | 0 | 1 | 0 | 0 | X | 5 |

| Sheet D | 1 | 2 | 3 | 4 | 5 | 6 | 7 | 8 | 9 | 10 | Final |
|---|---|---|---|---|---|---|---|---|---|---|---|
| Michelle Hartwell | 0 | 2 | 0 | 0 | 2 | 0 | 0 | 1 | 1 | 0 | 6 |
| Shianna Lind 🔨 | 1 | 0 | 0 | 2 | 0 | 2 | 1 | 0 | 0 | 1 | 7 |

=== Draw 7 ===
Wednesday, January 7, 6:30 pm

| Sheet C | 1 | 2 | 3 | 4 | 5 | 6 | 7 | 8 | 9 | 10 | Final |
|---|---|---|---|---|---|---|---|---|---|---|---|
| Selena Sturmay 🔨 | 3 | 0 | 2 | 2 | 0 | 1 | X | X | X | X | 8 |
| Gracelyn Richards | 0 | 1 | 0 | 0 | 1 | 0 | X | X | X | X | 2 |

| Sheet D | 1 | 2 | 3 | 4 | 5 | 6 | 7 | 8 | 9 | 10 | Final |
|---|---|---|---|---|---|---|---|---|---|---|---|
| Serena Gray-Withers | 0 | 2 | 0 | 2 | 2 | 0 | 0 | 2 | X | X | 8 |
| Myla Plett 🔨 | 1 | 0 | 1 | 0 | 0 | 0 | 1 | 0 | X | X | 3 |

=== Draw 8 ===
Thursday, January 8, 9:00 am

| Sheet A | 1 | 2 | 3 | 4 | 5 | 6 | 7 | 8 | 9 | 10 | Final |
|---|---|---|---|---|---|---|---|---|---|---|---|
| Keelie Duncan | 2 | 0 | 0 | 1 | 1 | 0 | 1 | 0 | 0 | 0 | 5 |
| Leslie Hammond 🔨 | 0 | 0 | 1 | 0 | 0 | 2 | 0 | 1 | 1 | 2 | 7 |

| Sheet B | 1 | 2 | 3 | 4 | 5 | 6 | 7 | 8 | 9 | 10 | Final |
|---|---|---|---|---|---|---|---|---|---|---|---|
| Amanda Sluchinski | 1 | 0 | 2 | 0 | 0 | 0 | 1 | 0 | 2 | 0 | 6 |
| Shianna Lind 🔨 | 0 | 0 | 0 | 1 | 0 | 0 | 0 | 2 | 0 | 2 | 5 |

=== Draw 9 ===
Thursday, January 8, 1:30 pm

| Sheet A | 1 | 2 | 3 | 4 | 5 | 6 | 7 | 8 | 9 | 10 | 11 | Final |
|---|---|---|---|---|---|---|---|---|---|---|---|---|
| Krysta Hilker 🔨 | 2 | 0 | 2 | 0 | 0 | 1 | 1 | 0 | 1 | 0 | 0 | 7 |
| Gracelyn Richards | 0 | 1 | 0 | 2 | 1 | 0 | 0 | 2 | 0 | 1 | 2 | 9 |

| Sheet B | 1 | 2 | 3 | 4 | 5 | 6 | 7 | 8 | 9 | 10 | Final |
|---|---|---|---|---|---|---|---|---|---|---|---|
| Lisa Miller | 0 | 1 | 0 | 2 | 0 | 0 | 1 | 1 | 0 | 0 | 5 |
| Myla Plett 🔨 | 1 | 0 | 2 | 0 | 1 | 0 | 0 | 0 | 1 | 3 | 8 |

=== Draw 10 ===
Thursday, January 8, 6:30 pm

| Sheet A | 1 | 2 | 3 | 4 | 5 | 6 | 7 | 8 | 9 | 10 | 11 | Final |
|---|---|---|---|---|---|---|---|---|---|---|---|---|
| Serena Gray-Withers | 0 | 2 | 1 | 0 | 0 | 2 | 0 | 2 | 0 | 0 | 2 | 9 |
| Selena Sturmay 🔨 | 2 | 0 | 0 | 2 | 1 | 0 | 1 | 0 | 0 | 1 | 0 | 7 |

| Sheet B | 1 | 2 | 3 | 4 | 5 | 6 | 7 | 8 | 9 | 10 | Final |
|---|---|---|---|---|---|---|---|---|---|---|---|
| Emma DeSchiffart | 0 | 1 | 0 | 3 | 1 | 1 | 1 | 0 | 0 | 1 | 8 |
| Krysta Hilker 🔨 | 1 | 0 | 1 | 0 | 0 | 0 | 0 | 1 | 1 | 0 | 4 |

| Sheet C | 1 | 2 | 3 | 4 | 5 | 6 | 7 | 8 | 9 | 10 | Final |
|---|---|---|---|---|---|---|---|---|---|---|---|
| Michelle Hartwell 🔨 | 1 | 3 | 0 | 1 | 0 | 0 | 0 | 0 | 1 | 1 | 7 |
| Lisa Miller | 0 | 0 | 1 | 0 | 2 | 3 | 1 | 1 | 0 | 0 | 8 |

=== Draw 11 ===
Friday, January 9, 9:00 am

| Sheet C | 1 | 2 | 3 | 4 | 5 | 6 | 7 | 8 | 9 | 10 | Final |
|---|---|---|---|---|---|---|---|---|---|---|---|
| Gracelyn Richards 🔨 | 0 | 0 | 1 | 0 | 1 | X | X | X | X | X | 2 |
| Myla Plett | 1 | 4 | 0 | 2 | 0 | X | X | X | X | X | 7 |

| Sheet D | 1 | 2 | 3 | 4 | 5 | 6 | 7 | 8 | 9 | 10 | Final |
|---|---|---|---|---|---|---|---|---|---|---|---|
| Amanda Sluchinski | 0 | 1 | 0 | 2 | 0 | 0 | 1 | 0 | 1 | X | 5 |
| Selena Sturmay 🔨 | 1 | 0 | 2 | 0 | 2 | 1 | 0 | 2 | 0 | X | 8 |

=== Draw 12 ===
Friday, January 9, 1:30 pm

| Sheet A | 1 | 2 | 3 | 4 | 5 | 6 | 7 | 8 | 9 | 10 | Final |
|---|---|---|---|---|---|---|---|---|---|---|---|
| Shianna Lind 🔨 | 0 | 1 | 3 | 0 | 0 | 1 | 0 | 0 | 0 | 1 | 6 |
| Gracelyn Richards | 0 | 0 | 0 | 4 | 0 | 0 | 0 | 1 | 0 | 0 | 5 |

| Sheet C | 1 | 2 | 3 | 4 | 5 | 6 | 7 | 8 | 9 | 10 | Final |
|---|---|---|---|---|---|---|---|---|---|---|---|
| Amanda Sluchinski | 0 | 0 | 0 | 3 | 0 | 4 | 0 | 2 | 0 | X | 9 |
| Leslie Hammond 🔨 | 0 | 0 | 1 | 0 | 3 | 0 | 3 | 0 | 0 | X | 7 |

=== Draw 13 ===
Friday, January 9, 6:30 pm

| Sheet A | 1 | 2 | 3 | 4 | 5 | 6 | 7 | 8 | 9 | 10 | Final |
|---|---|---|---|---|---|---|---|---|---|---|---|
| Myla Plett | 0 | 0 | 4 | 0 | 0 | 1 | 0 | 0 | 1 | 0 | 6 |
| Selena Sturmay 🔨 | 1 | 1 | 0 | 1 | 2 | 0 | 2 | 1 | 0 | 1 | 9 |

| Sheet D | 1 | 2 | 3 | 4 | 5 | 6 | 7 | 8 | 9 | 10 | Final |
|---|---|---|---|---|---|---|---|---|---|---|---|
| Emma DeSchiffart | 0 | 0 | 6 | 2 | 1 | X | X | X | X | X | 9 |
| Lisa Miller 🔨 | 0 | 1 | 0 | 0 | 0 | X | X | X | X | X | 1 |

=== Draw 15 ===
Saturday, January 10, 1:30 pm

| Sheet C | 1 | 2 | 3 | 4 | 5 | 6 | 7 | 8 | 9 | 10 | Final |
|---|---|---|---|---|---|---|---|---|---|---|---|
| Myla Plett | 0 | 2 | 0 | 1 | 0 | 0 | 2 | 0 | 3 | 0 | 8 |
| Emma DeSchiffart 🔨 | 2 | 0 | 1 | 0 | 3 | 2 | 0 | 1 | 0 | 1 | 10 |

| Sheet D | 1 | 2 | 3 | 4 | 5 | 6 | 7 | 8 | 9 | 10 | 11 | Final |
|---|---|---|---|---|---|---|---|---|---|---|---|---|
| Amanda Sluchinski 🔨 | 0 | 2 | 0 | 2 | 0 | 1 | 0 | 0 | 2 | 0 | 1 | 8 |
| Shianna Lind | 0 | 0 | 1 | 0 | 1 | 0 | 3 | 1 | 0 | 1 | 0 | 7 |

== Playoffs ==
Page playoff system
A | Serena Gray-Withers | 6
B | Selena Sturmay | 5
C1 | Amanda Sluchinski | 9
C2 | Emma DeSchiffart | 8

Semifinal
B | Selena Sturmay | 9
C1 | Amanda Sluchinski | 2

Final
A | Serena Gray-Withers | 5
B | Selena Sturmay | 9

=== A vs. B ===
Saturday, January 10, 6:30 pm

| Sheet C | 1 | 2 | 3 | 4 | 5 | 6 | 7 | 8 | 9 | 10 | Final |
|---|---|---|---|---|---|---|---|---|---|---|---|
| Serena Gray-Withers 🔨 | 0 | 0 | 2 | 1 | 0 | 0 | 1 | 1 | 0 | 1 | 6 |
| Selena Sturmay | 0 | 2 | 0 | 0 | 1 | 1 | 0 | 0 | 1 | 0 | 5 |

=== C1 vs. C2 ===
Saturday, January 10, 6:30 pm

| Sheet D | 1 | 2 | 3 | 4 | 5 | 6 | 7 | 8 | 9 | 10 | 11 | Final |
|---|---|---|---|---|---|---|---|---|---|---|---|---|
| Amanda Sluchinski | 0 | 0 | 0 | 1 | 0 | 1 | 2 | 0 | 4 | 0 | 1 | 9 |
| Emma DeSchiffart 🔨 | 0 | 2 | 1 | 0 | 1 | 0 | 0 | 2 | 0 | 2 | 0 | 8 |

=== Semifinal ===
Sunday, January 11, 9:30 am

| Sheet C | 1 | 2 | 3 | 4 | 5 | 6 | 7 | 8 | 9 | 10 | Final |
|---|---|---|---|---|---|---|---|---|---|---|---|
| Selena Sturmay 🔨 | 0 | 2 | 1 | 3 | 0 | 2 | 1 | 0 | X | X | 9 |
| Amanda Sluchinski | 0 | 0 | 0 | 0 | 1 | 0 | 0 | 1 | X | X | 2 |

=== Final ===
Sunday, January 11, 2:30 pm

| Sheet C | 1 | 2 | 3 | 4 | 5 | 6 | 7 | 8 | 9 | 10 | Final |
|---|---|---|---|---|---|---|---|---|---|---|---|
| Serena Gray-Withers 🔨 | 1 | 0 | 0 | 2 | 0 | 1 | 0 | 1 | 0 | X | 5 |
| Selena Sturmay | 0 | 1 | 2 | 0 | 2 | 0 | 2 | 0 | 2 | X | 9 |

2026 Alberta Women's Curling Championship

Selena Sturmay
2nd Alberta Provincial Championship title
