= 2012 The Dominion Curling Club Championship =

Canadian national curling championship edition

- Host city: Scarborough, Ontario
- Arena: Scarboro Golf and Country Club
- Dates: November 19–24
- Men's winner: Alberta
- Curling club: Crestwood CC, Edmonton
- Skip: Dan Sherrard
- Third: Brandon Klassen
- Second: Kyle Reynolds
- Lead: Todd Kaasten
- Finalist: Manitoba (Steve Irwin)
- Women's winner: Ontario
- Curling club: Quinte CC, Belleville
- Skip: Caroline Deans
- Third: Sheri-Lynn Collyer
- Second: Kendra Lafleur
- Lead: Lynn Stapley
- Finalist: Quebec (Sonia Simard)

The 2012 The Dominion Curling Club Championship was held from November 19 to 24 at the Scarboro Golf and Country Club in Scarborough, Ontario. In the men's final, Dan Sherrard of Alberta defeated Steve Irwin of Manitoba with a score of 7–6, stealing the winning point in the eight end. In the women's final, Caroline Deans of Ontario defeated Sonia Simard of Quebec with a score of 8–3.

== Men ==
=== Teams ===
The teams are listed as follows:

Province	Skip	Third	Second	Lead	Locale
Alberta	Dan Sherrard	Brandon Klassen	Kyle Reynolds	Todd Kaasten	Crestwood CC, Edmonton
British Columbia	Richard Brower	Berry Breton	Larry Macdonald	Deryk Brower	Peace Arch CC, White Rock
Manitoba	Steve Irwin	Justin Rabe	Travis Brooks	Cody Rabe	Brandon CC, Brandon
New Brunswick	Marcel Robichaud	Luc Savoie	Lloyd Morrison	Ghislain Noel	Beauséjour CC, Moncton
Newfoundland and Labrador	Paul Harvey	Steve Bragg	Mike Morrissey	Brian Noseworthy	RE/MAX Centre, St. John's
Northern Ontario	Russ Mellerup	Dan Kukko	Ron Evans	Mike Rutledge	Port Arthur CC, Thunder Bay
Northwest Territories	Paul Delorey	D'arcy Delorey	Daniel Richards	Glenn Smith	Hay River CC, Yellowknife
Nova Scotia	Wayne Sangster	Nick Deagle	Jason van Vonceren	Phil Redden	Bluenose CC, New Glasgow
Nunavut	Edmond MacDonald	Kyle Nowlan	Darryl Mcgrath	Glen House	Iqaluit CC, Iqaluit
Ontario	Jordan Keon	Curtis Samoy	Trevor Talbott	Michael Keon	Richmond Hill CC, Richmond Hill
Prince Edward Island	Alan Inman	Steven Thomson	Gordon Fall	Tony Quigley	Crapaud Community CC, Crapaud
Saskatchewan	Brian Humble	Michael Carss	Rob Spinney	Tyler Matheson	Saskatoon Sutherland CC, Saskatoon
Quebec	Richard Faguy	Wayne Ruggles	Stéphane Paquette	Martin Pautry	Buckingham CC, Buckingham
Yukon	Ray Mikkelsen	Dustin Mikkelsen	Scott Williamson	Wade Kopan	Whitehorse CC, Whitehorse

=== Round-robin standings ===
Final round-robin standings

Key
Teams to Playoffs
Teams to Tiebreakers

Blue Pool	Skip	W	L
Saskatchewan	Brian Humble	6	0
Newfoundland and Labrador	Paul Harvey	4	2
Nova Scotia	Wayne Sangster	4	2
Ontario	Jordan Keon	4	2
Quebec	Richard Faguy	2	4
Prince Edward Island	Alan Inman	1	5
Nunavut	Edmond MacDonald	0	6

Grey Pool	Skip	W	L
Manitoba	Steve Irwin	6	0
Alberta	Dan Sherrard	5	1
British Columbia	Richard Brower	3	3
Northern Ontario	Russ Mellerup	3	3
Yukon	Ray Mikkelsen	2	4
Northwest Territories	Paul Delorey	2	4
New Brunswick	Marcel Robichaud	0	6

=== Round-robin results ===
All draw times listed in Eastern Standard Time.

==== Draw 1 ====
Monday, November 19, 4:45 pm

Sheet 1	1	2	3	4	5	6	7	8	Final
British Columbia (Brower)	0	0	0	0	0	0	2	0	2
Manitoba (Irwin) 🔨	0	1	0	0	3	1	0	0	5

Sheet 2	1	2	3	4	5	6	7	8	Final
Yukon (Mikkelsen)	0	0	1	0	0	0	0	X	1
Alberta (Sherrard)	2	1	0	2	2	1	0	X	8

Sheet 3	1	2	3	4	5	6	7	8	9	Final
Northern Ontario (Mellerup)	0	1	2	0	1	0	0	1	1	6
New Brunswick (Robichaud) 🔨	1	0	0	1	0	3	0	0	0	5

Sheet 4	1	2	3	4	5	6	7	8	Final
Quebec (Faguy)	0	0	0	0	0	1	1	0	2
Saskatchewan (Humble) 🔨	0	2	0	1	1	0	0	0	4

Sheet 5	1	2	3	4	5	6	7	8	Final
Nunavut (MacDonald) 🔨	1	0	0	1	0	0	1	0	3
Ontario (Keon)	0	1	2	0	3	1	0	0	7

Sheet 6	1	2	3	4	5	6	7	8	Final
Nova Scotia (Sangster)	2	2	0	3	0	0	1	0	8
Newfoundland and Labrador (Harvey)	0	0	2	0	0	0	0	0	2

Northwest Territories and Prince Edward Island receive byes this round.

==== Draw 3 ====
Tuesday, November 20, 9:30 am

Sheet 1	1	2	3	4	5	6	7	8	Final
Nova Scotia (Sangster)	0	1	0	0	2	0	1	0	4
Ontario (Keon) 🔨	1	0	1	2	0	1	0	1	6

Sheet 2	1	2	3	4	5	6	7	8	Final
Prince Edward Island (Inman)	0	0	2	0	0	2	1	X	5
Quebec (Faguy) 🔨	1	0	0	5	1	0	0	X	7

Sheet 3	1	2	3	4	5	6	7	8	Final
Saskatchewan (Humble) 🔨	4	0	5	0	2	X	X	X	11
Nunavut (MacDonald)	0	1	0	1	0	X	X	X	2

Sheet 4	1	2	3	4	5	6	7	8	Final
Northern Ontario (Mellerup) 🔨	0	1	0	2	0	X	X	X	3
Alberta (Sherrard)	1	0	7	0	3	X	X	X	11

Sheet 5	1	2	3	4	5	6	7	8	Final
Northwest Territories (Delorey)	0	0	0	2	0	0	0	X	2
British Columbia (Brower) 🔨	2	1	1	0	0	3	2	X	9

Sheet 6	1	2	3	4	5	6	7	8	Final
Manitoba (Irwin)	1	0	0	2	0	0	2	1	6
Yukon (Mikkelsen) 🔨	0	1	1	0	1	1	0	0	4

New Brunswick and Newfoundland and Labrador receive byes this round.

==== Draw 5 ====
Tuesday, November 20, 4:45 pm

Sheet 1	1	2	3	4	5	6	7	8	Final
Northwest Territories (Delorey) 🔨	3	0	0	2	0	1	0	0	6
Yukon (Mikkelsen)	0	3	1	0	2	0	2	0	8

Sheet 2	1	2	3	4	5	6	7	8	Final
Manitoba (Irwin) 🔨	1	0	4	1	0	1	0	X	7
Northern Ontario (Mellerup)	0	1	0	0	0	0	0	X	1

Sheet 3	1	2	3	4	5	6	7	8	Final
Newfoundland and Labrador (Harvey)	2	2	0	3	2	0	X	X	9
Ontario (Keon) 🔨	0	0	1	0	0	0	X	X	1

Sheet 4	1	2	3	4	5	6	7	8	Final
Prince Edward Island (Inman) 🔨	2	2	0	1	0	0	3	0	8
Nunavut (MacDonald)	0	0	1	0	2	2	0	0	5

Sheet 5	1	2	3	4	5	6	7	8	Final
New Brunswick (Robichaud)	1	0	1	0	1	1	0	0	4
Alberta (Sherrard) 🔨	0	1	0	2	0	0	3	1	7

Sheet 6	1	2	3	4	5	6	7	8	Final
Saskatchewan (Humble) 🔨	0	1	0	1	2	0	0	3	7
Nova Scotia (Sangster)	0	0	0	0	0	3	1	0	4

British Columbia and Quebec receive byes this round.

==== Draw 8 ====
Wednesday, November 21, 1:15 pm

Sheet 1	1	2	3	4	5	6	7	8	Final
Prince Edward Island (Inman)	1	1	2	0	0	0	1	0	5
Saskatchewan (Humble) 🔨	0	0	0	2	3	1	0	1	7

Sheet 2	1	2	3	4	5	6	7	8	Final
Newfoundland and Labrador (Harvey)	3	0	3	0	0	3	0	X	9
Nunavut (MacDonald) 🔨	0	1	0	2	1	0	3	X	7

Sheet 3	1	2	3	4	5	6	7	8	Final
Northwest Territories (Delorey)	1	0	0	0	0	0	X	X	1
Manitoba (Irwin) 🔨	0	0	2	1	2	2	X	X	7

Sheet 4	1	2	3	4	5	6	7	8	Final
New Brunswick (Robichaud)	2	0	0	1	0	1	0	0	4
Yukon (Mikkelsen) 🔨	0	2	1	0	2	0	1	3	9

Sheet 5	1	2	3	4	5	6	7	8	Final
Ontario (Keon) 🔨	3	2	0	1	0	2	0	X	8
Quebec (Faguy)	0	0	1	0	3	0	0	X	4

Sheet 6	1	2	3	4	5	6	7	8	Final
Alberta (Sherrard) 🔨	1	1	0	2	2	0	X	X	6
British Columbia (Brower)	0	0	1	0	0	1	X	X	2

Northern Ontario and Nova Scotia receive byes this round.

==== Draw 10 ====
Wednesday, November 21, 8:15 pm

Sheet 1	1	2	3	4	5	6	7	8	Final
Manitoba (Irwin) 🔨	0	1	1	0	4	2	X	X	8
New Brunswick (Robichaud)	0	0	0	1	0	0	X	X	1

Sheet 2	1	2	3	4	5	6	7	8	Final
Nova Scotia (Sangster) 🔨	3	0	0	1	0	3	X	X	7
Prince Edward Island (Inman)	0	1	0	0	1	0	X	X	2

Sheet 3	1	2	3	4	5	6	7	8	Final
Yukon (Mikkelsen) 🔨	0	1	0	0	1	0	0	X	2
British Columbia (Brower)	2	0	1	1	0	1	1	X	6

Sheet 4	1	2	3	4	5	6	7	8	Final
Saskatchewan (Humble) 🔨	1	0	0	3	1	1	0	X	6
Newfoundland and Labrador (Harvey)	0	0	1	0	0	0	1	X	2

Sheet 5	1	2	3	4	5	6	7	8	Final
Northern Ontario (Mellerup) 🔨	1	0	0	0	2	0	2	0	5
Northwest Territories (Delorey)	0	2	1	1	0	1	0	3	8

Sheet 6	1	2	3	4	5	6	7	8	Final
Nunavut (MacDonald)	0	2	0	0	1	0	0	X	3
Quebec (Faguy) 🔨	2	0	2	1	0	2	1	X	8

Alberta and Ontario receive byes this round.

==== Draw 11 ====
Thursday, November 22, 9:30 am

Sheet 1	1	2	3	4	5	6	7	8	Final
Nunavut (MacDonald)	0	3	0	0	0	0	1	X	4
Nova Scotia (Sangster) 🔨	1	0	2	1	1	3	0	X	8

Sheet 2	1	2	3	4	5	6	7	8	Final
British Columbia (Brower) 🔨	1	1	0	4	1	1	X	X	8
New Brunswick (Robichaud)	0	0	0	0	0	0	X	X	0

Sheet 3	1	2	3	4	5	6	7	8	Final
Alberta (Sherrard) 🔨	3	0	1	0	2	0	0	3	9
Northwest Territories (Delorey)	0	1	0	2	0	4	1	0	8

Sheet 4	1	2	3	4	5	6	7	8	Final
Ontario (Keon) 🔨	2	1	0	1	2	3	X	X	9
Prince Edward Island (Inman)	0	0	1	0	0	0	X	X	1

Sheet 5	1	2	3	4	5	6	7	8	Final
Quebec (Faguy) 🔨	0	1	0	1	1	0	1	X	4
Newfoundland and Labrador (Harvey)	3	0	1	0	0	3	0	X	7

Sheet 6	1	2	3	4	5	6	7	8	9	Final
Yukon (Mikkelsen)	0	2	0	0	0	1	0	1	0	4
Northern Ontario (Mellerup) 🔨	0	0	1	1	1	0	1	0	1	5

Manitoba and Saskatchewan receive byes this round.

==== Draw 13 ====
Thursday, November 22, 4:45 pm

Sheet 1	1	2	3	4	5	6	7	8	Final
Newfoundland and Labrador (Harvey) 🔨	3	0	2	0	0	1	1	X	7
Prince Edward Island (Inman)	0	1	0	0	1	0	0	X	2

Sheet 2	1	2	3	4	5	6	7	8	Final
Quebec (Faguy) 🔨	0	1	0	0	1	0	2	0	4
Nova Scotia (Sangster)	3	0	1	1	0	1	0	1	7

Sheet 3	1	2	3	4	5	6	7	8	Final
Ontario (Keon)	0	2	0	2	0	0	0	0	4
Saskatchewan (Humble) 🔨	1	0	2	0	2	0	0	2	7

Sheet 4	1	2	3	4	5	6	7	8	Final
British Columbia (Brower)	0	2	0	1	0	0	1	0	4
Northern Ontario (Mellerup) 🔨	0	0	2	0	0	3	0	1	6

Sheet 5	1	2	3	4	5	6	7	8	Final
Alberta (Sherrard)	0	2	0	1	1	0	2	0	6
Manitoba (Irwin) 🔨	2	0	2	0	0	2	0	1	7

Sheet 6	1	2	3	4	5	6	7	8	Final
New Brunswick (Robichaud) 🔨	0	2	0	2	0	0	1	0	5
Northwest Territories (Delorey)	0	0	3	0	1	1	0	1	6

Yukon and Nunavut receive byes this round.

=== Tiebreakers ===
Friday, November 23, 9:30 am

Team	1	2	3	4	5	6	7	8	Final
Ontario (Keon)	0	5	0	2	0	2	0	X	9
Newfoundland and Labrador (Harvey) 🔨	1	0	3	0	0	0	0	X	4

Friday, November 23, 1:15 pm

Team	1	2	3	4	5	6	7	8	Final
Nova Scotia (Sangster)	0	0	2	2	1	0	3	X	7
Ontario (Keon) 🔨	0	2	0	0	0	2	0	X	4

=== Playoffs ===
Semifinal
B1	Saskatchewan	6
G2	Alberta	7
G1	Manitoba	7
B2	Nova Scotia	3

Final
G2	Alberta	7
G1	Manitoba	6

==== Semifinal ====
Friday, November 23, 7:00 pm

Team	1	2	3	4	5	6	7	8	Final
Saskatchewan (Humble) 🔨	2	0	1	0	1	0	2	0	6
Alberta (Sherrard)	0	0	0	3	0	3	0	1	7

Team	1	2	3	4	5	6	7	8	Final
Manitoba (Irwin) 🔨	2	1	0	0	1	0	1	2	7
Nova Scotia (Sangster)	0	0	1	1	0	1	0	0	3

==== Final ====
Saturday, November 24, 2:00 pm

Team	1	2	3	4	5	6	7	8	Final
Alberta (Sherrard)	0	1	0	3	1	0	1	1	7
Manitoba (Irwin) 🔨	2	0	3	0	0	1	0	0	6

== Women ==
=== Teams ===
The teams are listed as follows:

Province	Skip	Third	Second	Lead	Locale
Alberta	Norma Brown	Katie Crump	Heather Wilson	Tracey Brosz	Strathmore CC, Strathmore
British Columbia	Deb Goodwin	Lonnie Schopp	Kim Jonsson	Lori Ross	Comox Valley CC, Courtenay
Manitoba	Lori Pelissier	Heather Ruby	Shelley Smith	Sandy Maskiw	Thistle CC, Winnipeg
New Brunswick	Shannon Tatlock	Leanne Richardson	Shelley Thomas	Lynn LeBlanc	Beauséjour CC, Moncton
Newfoundland and Labrador	Pam Osborne	Candy Thomas	Tina Horlick	Barb Dawson	RE/MAX Centre, St. John's
Northern Ontario	Karen Saarimaki	Tara Evoy	Tarra Miller	Sylvie Fortier	Geraldton CC, Geraldton
Northwest Territories	Stacey Stabel	Krista Wesley	Jill Andrew	Debbie Moss	Yellowknife CC, Yellowknife
Nova Scotia	Marion MacAulay	Kerri Denny	Gilda Chisholm	Ann MacLean	Bluenose CC, New Glasgow
Nunavut	Geneva Chislett	Denise Hutchings	Penny Dominix-Nadeau	Robyn Mackey	Iqaluit CC, Iqaluit
Ontario	Caroline Deans	Sheri-Lynn Collyer	Kendra Lafleur	Lynn Stapley	Quinte Curling Club, Belleville
Prince Edward Island	Nola Murphy	Donna Arsenault	Paulette Richard	Elspeth Carmody	Silver Fox C&YC, Summerside
Saskatchewan	Danette Tracey	Ashley Skjerdal	Charla Moore	Lianne Cretin	Weyburn CC, Weyburn
Quebec	Sonia Simard	Josée Bédard	Josée St-Amant	Guylaine Sauvageau	CC Amos, Amos
Yukon	Jody Smallwood	Evelyn Pasichnyk	Joan Ewing	Jari Smarch	Whitehorse CC, Whitehorse

=== Round-robin standings ===
Final round-robin standings

Key
Teams to Playoffs

Blue Pool	Skip	W	L
Ontario	Caroline Deans	6	0
Quebec	Sonia Simard	5	1
Nova Scotia	Marion MacAulay	4	2
Saskatchewan	Danette Tracey	3	3
Newfoundland and Labrador	Pam Osborne	1	5
Prince Edward Island	Nola Murphy	2	4
Nunavut	Geneva Chislett	0	6

Grey Pool	Skip	W	L
Manitoba	Lori Pelissier	5	1
Northwest Territories	Stacey Stabel	4	2
Alberta	Norma Brown	3	3
British Columbia	Deb Goodwin	3	3
New Brunswick	Shannon Tatlock	3	3
Northern Ontario	Karen Saarimaki	3	3
Yukon	Jody Smallwood	0	6

=== Round-robin results ===
All draw times listed in Eastern Standard Time.

==== Draw 2 ====
Monday, November 19, 8:15 pm

Sheet 1	1	2	3	4	5	6	7	8	Final
British Columbia (Goodwin)	0	0	1	2	2	1	0	0	6
Manitoba (Pelissier) 🔨	4	1	0	0	0	0	2	2	9

Sheet 2	1	2	3	4	5	6	7	8	Final
Yukon (Smallwood) 🔨	0	0	0	1	1	0	2	0	4
Alberta (Brown)	1	1	5	0	0	1	0	0	8

Sheet 3	1	2	3	4	5	6	7	8	Final
Northern Ontario (Saarimaki)	0	1	0	0	2	1	0	X	4
New Brunswick (Tatlock) 🔨	4	0	1	1	0	0	4	X	10

Sheet 4	1	2	3	4	5	6	7	8	Final
Quebec (Simard) 🔨	0	0	2	3	2	2	0	X	9
Saskatchewan (Tracey)	0	0	0	0	0	0	0	X	0

Sheet 5	1	2	3	4	5	6	7	8	9	Final
Nunavut (Chislett) 🔨	0	1	0	2	0	1	0	0	0	4
Ontario (Deans)	2	0	1	0	0	0	1	1	0	5

Sheet 6	1	2	3	4	5	6	7	8	Final
Nova Scotia (MacAulay) 🔨	1	1	0	0	2	0	2	X	6
Newfoundland and Labrador (Osborne)	0	0	0	1	0	1	0	X	2

Northwest Territories and Prince Edward Island receive byes this round.

==== Draw 4 ====
Tuesday, November 20, 1:15 pm

Sheet 1	1	2	3	4	5	6	7	8	Final
Nova Scotia (MacAulay)	0	2	0	0	0	0	0	X	2
Ontario (Deans) 🔨	1	0	1	1	2	0	2	X	7

Sheet 2	1	2	3	4	5	6	7	8	Final
Prince Edward Island (Murphy)	0	0	0	0	1	0	X	X	1
Quebec (Simard) 🔨	0	1	1	1	0	5	X	X	8

Sheet 3	1	2	3	4	5	6	7	8	Final
Saskatchewan (Tracey) 🔨	0	1	0	1	1	3	0	X	6
Nunavut (Chislett)	0	0	1	0	0	0	1	X	2

Sheet 4	1	2	3	4	5	6	7	8	Final
Northern Ontario (Saarimaki)	0	0	0	1	0	1	0	X	2
Alberta (Brown) 🔨	1	0	2	0	3	0	3	X	9

Sheet 5	1	2	3	4	5	6	7	8	9	Final
Northwest Territories (Stabel)	0	1	1	0	1	1	1	0	0	5
British Columbia (Goodwin) 🔨	1	0	0	4	0	0	0	0	1	6

Sheet 6	1	2	3	4	5	6	7	8	Final
Manitoba (Pelissier) 🔨	2	0	2	0	2	1	3	X	10
Yukon (Smallwood)	0	2	0	1	0	0	0	X	3

New Brunswick and Newfoundland and Labrador receive byes this round.

==== Draw 6 ====
Tuesday, November 20, 8:15 pm

Sheet 1	1	2	3	4	5	6	7	8	Final
Northwest Territories (Stabel)	1	2	3	1	4	X	X	X	11
Yukon (Smallwood) 🔨	0	0	0	0	0	X	X	X	0

Sheet 2	1	2	3	4	5	6	7	8	Final
Manitoba (Pelissier)	2	0	0	0	4	0	1	0	7
Northern Ontario (Saarimaki) 🔨	0	1	0	2	0	1	0	0	4

Sheet 3	1	2	3	4	5	6	7	8	Final
Newfoundland and Labrador (Osborne)	0	1	0	0	0	1	0	X	2
Ontario (Deans) 🔨	4	0	1	1	1	0	0	X	7

Sheet 4	1	2	3	4	5	6	7	8	Final
Prince Edward Island (Murphy) 🔨	0	0	0	2	0	0	7	X	7
Nunavut (Chislett)	1	1	1	0	1	1	0	X	5

Sheet 5	1	2	3	4	5	6	7	8	Final
New Brunswick (Tatlock) 🔨	0	1	0	3	1	0	0	1	6
Alberta (Brown)	1	0	1	0	0	0	1	0	3

Sheet 6	1	2	3	4	5	6	7	8	Final
Saskatchewan (Tracey)	0	0	0	0	0	1	X	X	1
Nova Scotia (MacAulay) 🔨	0	3	1	1	1	0	X	X	6

British Columbia and Quebec receive byes this round.

==== Draw 7 ====
Wednesday, November 21, 9:30 am

Sheet 1	1	2	3	4	5	6	7	8	Final
Prince Edward Island (Murphy)	0	0	0	0	2	0	X	X	2
Saskatchewan (Tracey) 🔨	2	0	1	2	0	3	X	X	8

Sheet 2	1	2	3	4	5	6	7	8	Final
Newfoundland and Labrador (Osborne) 🔨	2	1	1	0	2	0	1	X	7
Nunavut (Chislett)	0	0	0	2	0	3	0	X	5

Sheet 3	1	2	3	4	5	6	7	8	Final
Northwest Territories (Stabel)	0	0	2	2	0	2	0	X	6
Manitoba (Pelissier) 🔨	2	0	0	0	1	0	2	X	5

Sheet 4	1	2	3	4	5	6	7	8	Final
New Brunswick (Tatlock)	0	1	3	4	0	3	X	X	11
Yukon (Smallwood) 🔨	1	0	0	0	1	0	X	X	2

Sheet 5	1	2	3	4	5	6	7	8	Final
Ontario (Deans) 🔨	1	0	4	0	2	1	X	X	8
Quebec (Simard)	0	1	0	1	0	0	X	X	2

Sheet 6	1	2	3	4	5	6	7	8	Final
Alberta (Brown) 🔨	1	2	0	2	0	1	0	1	7
British Columbia (Goodwin)	0	0	1	0	1	0	2	0	4

Northern Ontario and Nova Scotia receive byes this round.

==== Draw 9 ====
Wednesday, November 21, 4:45 pm

Sheet 1	1	2	3	4	5	6	7	8	Final
Manitoba (Pelissier)	0	0	1	0	4	0	1	2	8
New Brunswick (Tatlock) 🔨	0	0	0	2	0	1	0	0	3

Sheet 2	1	2	3	4	5	6	7	8	Final
Nova Scotia (MacAulay) 🔨	2	0	1	1	0	4	0	X	8
Prince Edward Island (Murphy)	0	1	0	0	1	0	0	X	2

Sheet 3	1	2	3	4	5	6	7	8	Final
Yukon (Smallwood) 🔨	0	1	2	0	2	0	0	X	5
British Columbia (Goodwin)	4	0	0	5	0	3	1	X	13

Sheet 4	1	2	3	4	5	6	7	8	Final
Saskatchewan (Tracey)	0	1	1	0	2	1	0	1	6
Newfoundland and Labrador (Osborne) 🔨	2	0	0	1	0	0	1	0	4

Sheet 5	1	2	3	4	5	6	7	8	Final
Northern Ontario (Saarimaki) 🔨	0	3	0	4	0	2	0	1	10
Northwest Territories (Stabel)	0	0	4	0	1	0	2	0	7

Sheet 6	1	2	3	4	5	6	7	8	Final
Nunavut (Chislett)	0	1	1	0	0	0	X	X	2
Quebec (Simard) 🔨	3	0	0	2	3	1	X	X	9

Alberta and Ontario receive byes this round.

==== Draw 12 ====
Thursday, November 22, 1:15 pm

Sheet 1	1	2	3	4	5	6	7	8	Final
Nunavut (Chislett)	0	0	1	1	0	1	0	1	4
Nova Scotia (MacAulay) 🔨	1	1	0	0	1	0	2	0	5

Sheet 2	1	2	3	4	5	6	7	8	Final
British Columbia (Goodwin)	2	4	0	2	0	2	X	X	10
New Brunswick (Tatlock) 🔨	0	0	1	0	1	0	X	X	2

Sheet 3	1	2	3	4	5	6	7	8	Final
Alberta (Brown)	0	0	1	0	2	0	0	0	3
Northwest Territories (Stabel) 🔨	1	0	0	2	0	3	1	0	7

Sheet 4	1	2	3	4	5	6	7	8	Final
Ontario (Deans)	0	1	0	1	2	2	0	0	6
Prince Edward Island (Murphy) 🔨	1	0	1	0	0	0	1	2	5

Sheet 5	1	2	3	4	5	6	7	8	Final
Quebec (Simard) 🔨	2	0	2	2	0	0	2	X	8
Newfoundland and Labrador (Osborne)	0	1	0	0	1	1	0	X	3

Sheet 6	1	2	3	4	5	6	7	8	Final
Yukon (Smallwood) 🔨	0	0	0	1	0	0	X	X	1
Northern Ontario (Saarimaki)	1	4	2	0	1	2	X	X	10

Manitoba and Saskatchewan receive byes this round.

==== Draw 14 ====
Thursday, November 22, 8:15 pm

Sheet 1	1	2	3	4	5	6	7	8	Final
Newfoundland and Labrador (Osborne)	0	5	0	0	4	0	0	0	9
Prince Edward Island (Murphy) 🔨	3	0	2	3	0	1	1	1	11

Sheet 2	1	2	3	4	5	6	7	8	Final
Quebec (Simard)	1	1	0	0	1	2	0	1	6
Nova Scotia (MacAulay) 🔨	0	0	1	3	0	0	1	0	5

Sheet 3	1	2	3	4	5	6	7	8	Final
Ontario (Deans)	0	0	2	0	0	0	2	2	6
Saskatchewan (Tracey) 🔨	0	1	0	1	0	0	0	0	2

Sheet 4	1	2	3	4	5	6	7	8	Final
British Columbia (Goodwin)	0	2	0	1	1	0	1	0	5
Northern Ontario (Saarimaki) 🔨	3	0	1	0	0	1	0	1	6

Sheet 5	1	2	3	4	5	6	7	8	Final
Alberta (Brown)	0	0	0	0	1	1	0	0	2
Manitoba (Pelissier) 🔨	1	1	2	1	0	0	2	0	7

Sheet 6	1	2	3	4	5	6	7	8	Final
New Brunswick (Tatlock) 🔨	0	0	1	1	0	0	0	0	2
Northwest Territories (Stabel)	0	1	0	0	1	1	1	1	5

Yukon and Nunavut receive byes this round.

=== Playoffs ===
Semifinal
B1	Ontario	11
G2	Northwest Territories	1
G1	Manitoba	2
B2	Quebec	10

Final
B1	Ontario	8
B2	Quebec	3

==== Semifinal ====
Friday, November 23, 7:00 pm

Team	1	2	3	4	5	6	7	8	Final
Ontario (Deans) 🔨	4	1	3	1	0	2	X	X	11
Northwest Territories (Stabel)	0	0	0	0	1	0	X	X	1

Team	1	2	3	4	5	6	7	8	Final
Manitoba (Pelissier) 🔨	0	0	1	0	1	0	X	X	2
Quebec (Simard)	1	1	0	2	0	6	X	X	10

==== Final ====
Saturday, November 24, 10:45 am

Team	1	2	3	4	5	6	7	8	Final
Ontario (Deans) 🔨	1	0	1	0	3	0	3	0	8
Quebec (Simard)	0	1	0	1	0	1	0	0	3
