= Alberta Women's Curling Championship =

Canadian provincial tournament

- Established: 1951
- 2026 host city: Okotoks, Alberta
- 2026 arena: Okotoks Recreation Centre
- 2026 champion: Selena Sturmay

Current edition
- 2026 Alberta Women's Curling Championship

The Alberta Women's Curling Championship, formerly the Alberta Scotties Tournament of Hearts is the Alberta provincial women's curling tournament run by Curling Alberta. The winning team represents Alberta at the Canadian women's national championship, called the Scotties Tournament of Hearts.

== Past winners ==
National champions in bold. Western Canada champions (1953–1960) in italics.

Year	Team	Curling club	Host
2026	Selena Sturmay, Danielle Schmiemann, Dezaray Hawes, Paige Papley	Saville Community SC	Okotoks
2025	Kayla Skrlik, Margot Flemming, Ashton Skrlik, Geri-Lynn Ramsay	Garrison CC	Rimbey
2024	Selena Sturmay, Danielle Schmiemann, Dezaray Hawes, Paige Papley	Saville Community SC	St. Paul
2023	Kayla Skrlik, Brittany Tran, Geri-Lynn Ramsay, Ashton Skrlik	Garrison Curling Club	Wetaskiwin
2022	Laura Walker, Kate Cameron, Taylor McDonald, Nadine Scotland	Saville Community Sports Centre	Grande Prairie
2021	Cancelled due to the COVID-19 pandemic in Alberta. Team Walker (Laura Walker, Kate Cameron, Taylor McDonald, Nadine Scotland) represented Alberta at Scotties.		
2020	Laura Walker, Kate Cameron, Taylor McDonald, Nadine Scotland	Saville Community Sports Centre	Okotoks
2019	**Chelsea Carey, Sarah Wilkes, Dana Ferguson, Rachelle Brown**	The Glencoe Club	Stettler
2018	Casey Scheidegger, Cary-Anne McTaggart, Jessie Scheidegger, Kristie Moore	Grande Prairie Curling Club	Medicine Hat
2017	Shannon Kleibrink, Lisa Eyamie, Sarah Wilkes, Alison Thiessen	Okotoks Curling Club	St. Albert
2016	**Chelsea Carey, Amy Nixon, Jocelyn Peterman, Laine Peters**	The Glencoe Club	Calgary
2015	Val Sweeting, Lori Olson-Johns, Dana Ferguson, Rachelle Brown	Saville Sports Centre	Lacombe
2014	Val Sweeting, Dana Ferguson, Joanne Courtney, Rachelle Pidherny	Saville Sports Centre	Sylvan Lake
2013	Kristie Moore, Blaine Richards, Michelle Trarback, Amber Cheveldave	Grande Prairie Curling Club	Lethbridge
2012	**Heather Nedohin, Beth Iskiw, Jessica Mair, Laine Peters**	Saville Sports Centre	Leduc
2011	Shannon Kleibrink, Amy Nixon, Bronwen Webster, Chelsey Bell	Calgary Winter Club	Camrose
2010	Valerie Sweeting, Megan Einarson, Whitney More, Lindsay Makichuk	Saville Sports Centre	Calgary
2009	Cheryl Bernard, Susan O'Connor, Carolyn Darbyshire, Cori Bartel	Calgary Winter Club	Sylvan Lake
2008	Shannon Kleibrink, Amy Nixon, Bronwen Saunders, Chelsey Bell	Calgary Winter Club	Wainwright
2007	Cheryl Bernard, Susan O'Connor, Carolyn Darbyshire, Cori Bartel	Calgary Winter Club	Grande Prairie
2006	Cathy King, Lori Armistead, Raylene Rocque, Tracy Bush	Saville Sports Centre	Edmonton
2005	Cathy King, Lori Armistead, Raylene Rocque, Tracy Bush	Saville Sports Centre	Lethbridge
2004	Shannon Kleibrink, Amy Nixon, Glenys Bakker, Stephanie Marchand	Calgary Winter Club	Calgary
2003	Deb Santos, Jackie-Rae Greening, Brenda Bohmer, Kate Horne	Avonair Curling Club	Drayton Valley
2002	Cathy King, Lawnie MacDonald, Brenda Bohmer, Kate Horne	Ottewell Curling Club	Edmonton
2001	Renée Sonnenberg, Marcy Balderston, Tina McDonald, Karen McNamee	Sexsmith Curling Club	Red Deer
2000	Heather Nedohin, Carmen Barrack, Kristie Moore, Rona McGregor	Ottewell Curling Club	Grande Prairie
1999	Renée Handfield, Marcy Balderston, Tina McDonald, Karen McNamee	Sexsmith Curling Club	Edmonton
1998	**Cathy Borst, Heather Godberson, Brenda Bohmer, Kate Horne**	Ottewell Curling Club	Okotoks
1997	Cathy Borst, Heather Godberson, Brenda Bohmer, Kate Horne	Ottewell Curling Club	Fox Creek
1996	Cheryl Kullman, Karen Russ, Barb Sherrington, Judy Pendergast	Calgary Winter Club	Drayton Valley
1995	Cathy Borst, Maureen Brown, Deanne Shields, Kate Horne	Ottewell Curling Club	Medicine Hat
1994	Gloria Palinkas, Crystal McLeod, Charlene Robinson, Candy Taylor	Grande Prairie Curling Club	Peace River
1993	Shannon Kleibrink, Sandra Jenkins, Sally Shigehiro, Joanne Wright	Airdrie Curling Club	Edmonton
1992	Cheryl Bernard, Allison Earl, Barb Davies, Bev Kellerman	The Glencoe Club	Strathmore
1991	Deb Shermack, Jackie-Rae Greening, Diane Alexander, Leanne Usher	Avonair Curling Club	Grande Prairie
1990	Deb Shermack, Jackie-Rae Greening, Diane Alexander, Leanne Usher	Shamrock Curling Club	Lloydminster
1989	Deb Shermack, Penny Ryan, Diane Alexander, Twyla Pruden	Shamrock Curling Club	High River
1988	Lil Werenka, Simone Handfield, Bev Karasek, Kathy Bacon	Beaumont Curling Club	Fox Creek
1987	Karen Gould, Marcy Balderston, Tina Listhaeghe, Jarron Savill	Grande Prairie Curling Club	Edmonton
1986	Lil Werenka, May Thompson, Karen Currey, Jean Slemko	Beaumont Curling Club	Calgary
1985	Susan Seitz, Judy Lukowich, Judy Erickson, Betty McCracken	North Hill Curling Club	Grande Prairie
1984	Connie Bennett, Mavis Roland, Judy Carr, Betty Clarke	North Hill Curling Club	St. Albert
1983	Cathy Shaw, Christine Jurgenson, Sandra Rippel, Penny Ryan	Crestwood Curling Club	Airdrie
1982	Cathy Shaw, Karen Jones, Sandra Rippel, Donna Martineau	Crestwood Curling Club	Peace River
1981	**Susan Seitz, Judy Erickson, Myrna McKay, Betty McCracken**	Calgary Curling Club	Grand Centre
1980	Barb Davis, Gayle Pilling, Jane Rempel, Lyn Harker	Lethbridge Curling Club	Calgary
1979	Myrna McQuarrie, Barb Davis, Gayle Pilling, Diane Smummach	Lethbridge Curling Club	Grande Prairie
1978	Betty Cole, Liz Gemmell, Anne McGarvey, Shirley Fisk	Thistle Curling Club	Edmonton
1977	**Myrna McQuarrie, Rita Tarnava, Barb Davis, Jane Rempel**	Lethbridge Curling Club	Calgary
1976	Gail Lee, Jackie Spencer, Anne McGarvey, Liz Gemmell	Derrick Curling Club	Grande Prairie
1975	Sharon Grigg, Betty Booth, Gail Frandsen, Karen Love	Medicine Hat Curling Club	Edmonton
1974	Marilyn Johnston, Elaine Souness, Irene Fielder, Marie Schultheiss	St. Albert Curling Club	Fort Macleod
1973	Betty Cole, Shirley Fisk, Bonnie Cessford, Sharon Grey	Thistle Curling Club	Valleyview
1972	Polly Beaton, Doreen DesHarnais, Jan Bingert, Terry Kope	Medicine Hat Curling Club	Jasper
1971	Kay Baldwin, Joyce Bucholz, Shirley Mitchell, Gladys Tanish	Granite Curling Club	Calgary
1970	Betty Cole, Doris Olsen, Betty Jamieson, Bonnie Cessford	Thistle Curling Club	High Prairie
1969	Simonne Flynn, Eleanor Geddes, Jean Myrol, Fern Muirhead	Medicine Hat Curling Club	Edmonton
1968	**Hazel Jamison, Gail Lee, Jackie Spencer, June Coyle**	Crestwood Curling Club	Medicine Hat
1967	Kay Berreth, Marge Rodger, Violet Salt, Evelyn Robertson	Stampede Curling Club	Grande Prairie
1966	**Gail Lee, Hazel Jamison, Sharon Harrington, June Coyle**	Crestwood Curling Club	Edmonton
1965	Dorothy Thompson, Vivian Kortgaard, Ruth Hayes, Ila Watson	Edmonton Curling Club	Calgary
1964	Mickey Down, Sheila McKenzie, Bernice Ashlee, Joanne Bennett	Dawson Creek Curling Club (BC)	Grande Prairie
1963	Vera Reed, Bernie McKenzie, Phyllis Crist, Irene Halvorsen	Calgary Winter Club	Edmonton
1962	Vera Reed, Bernie McKenzie, Phyllis Crist, Irene Halvorsen	Calgary Winter Club	Calgary
1961	Dorothy Thompson, Ila Watson, Vivian Kortgaard, Ruth Hayes	Edmonton Curling Club	Grande Prairie
1960	Dorothy Thompson, Elinor Myers, Ila Watson, Vivian Kortgaard	Edmonton Business Girls	Stettler
1959	Dorothy Thompson, Elinor Myers, Ila Watson, Vivian Kortgaard	Edmonton Business Girls	Calgary
1958	Ethel Lees, Mabel Johnson, Margaret Humber, Kay McPhall	Red Deer Curling Club	Dawson Creek, British Columbia
1957	Mabel McCloy, Doris Tymko, Tris Moon, Grace Latta	Edmonton Thistle Club	Edmonton
1956	Doris Bull, Vonnie Clary, Norma Stewart, Violet Willoughby	Edmonton	Medicine Hat
1955	Ethel Morton, Myrtle Ellis, Ruth Gooder, Grace Olson	Calgary	Grande Prairie
1954	Dorothy Thompson, Ila Watson, Hazel Olson, Pat Damburger	Edmonton	Red Deer
1953	Doris Close, Fern Adams, Marg Hayward, Marie Oliphant	Medicine Hat	Lethbridge
1952	Doris Bull, Mrs. W. S. Jones, Mrs. L. Petticrew, Mrs. K. Pirie	Granite	Edmonton
1951	Bernie Brodeur, Mrs. T. L. Shepherd, Mrs. D. Chalmers, Mrs. R. Powers	Edmonton	Calgary
