= Hazel Jamison =

Canadian curler, golfer and hockey player

Medal record

Women's Curling

Representing Alberta

Canadian Women's Curling Championship
Gold medal – first place	1966 North Vancouver	
Gold medal – first place	1968 St. James	

Hazel Iona Jamison (née Case; October 14, 1914 – December 24, 2011) was a Canadian curler, golfer and ice hockey player.

Jamison was born in Jasper Place, Alberta, the daughter of Colin and Lucy Case. In her youth, she was a swimmer, winning the G.H. Wilson Cup in 1929, a provincial women's 50 yard race.

== Ice hockey ==
Jamison was a member of the Edmonton Rustlers women's hockey team in the 1932–33 season, which won the Dominion Women’s Amateur Hockey Association championship. Jamison scored the winning goal in the championship game.

== Golf ==
Jamison was one of the province's top women's golfers in the 1950s and 1960s. She won the Edmonton city championship three times (1952, 1953, 1954), was a member of the Alberta women's interprovincial team six times (1952, 1954, 1956, 1958, 1959, 1963), and won the Alberta women's amateur golf championship in 1964.

== Curling ==
Jamison's success in curling came later in life. In 1956, she won the Northern Alberta Women's Curling Association Bonspiel, and the Calgary Herald event of the Calgary women's bonspiel.

In 1957, Jamsion won the Edmonton city championship. Her rink made it to the final of the Northern Alberta playdowns, where they lost to Kay Pirie.

In 1959, the team were eliminated in the city playdowns, but rebounded later in the month to win the Wetaskiwin ladies bonspiel. A month later, the team won the Hunters grand challenge event at the Red Deer ladies' open bonspiel.

Jamison won her second Edmonton women's bonspiel championship in 1959. Later in the season, her rink made it to the 1960 Northern Alberta playdown final, but lost to Dorothy Thompson.

The team failed to make it out of the city playdowns in 1961, but won the Ponoka women's annual open bonspiel a month later. In 1962, the Jamison rink made it to the Northern Alberta Women's Silver D playdowns again, but were eliminated in the first day of competition. In 1963, they were eliminated in the city playdowns. The team finished off the season by winning 1963 Northern Alberta Ladies' Curling Association Bonspiel.

In 1965, Jamison failed to get out of the city playdowns again. The team would find more success the following season, with Jamison's daughter Gail Lee taking over skipping duties due to Jamison having a back-ailment. The team, which also included Sharon Herrington, and another one of Jamison's daughters, June Coyle finally won the Northern Alberta playdowns in 1966, defeating Dorothy Thompson in the final. This sent the team to the Alberta Silver D provincial women's curling championship for the first time. There, the team went undefeated with a 6–0 record, defeating Helen Ellis of Grande Prairie, Helen Henne of Yellowknife, Northwest Territories and Simone Flynn of Medicine Hat en route to the provincial championship. The team represented Alberta at the 1966 Diamond D Championship, Canada's national women's championship. There, the team had a perfect 9–0 record, winning the championship, the first for Alberta.

Jamison began the 1966–67 season by winning another Edmonton city women's bonspiel with team-mates June Coyle, Jackie Spencer and Jolly Drever. In the Northern Alberta playdowns, the team made it to the final, but were beaten there by Audrey Dyck.

The team, now consisting of Jamison and her daughters Gail Lee, Jackie Spencer and June Coyle won the 1968 Northern Alberta playdowns, defeating Jean Rankel in the final. This sent the team to play in the 1968 provincial championship, where they beat Calgary's Bunny Sage in the final. The team represented Alberta at the 1968 Canadian Ladies Curling Association Championship. They finished the round robin with a 7–2 record, tied for first with British Columbia's Myrtle Fashoway rink. In their final match of the round robin, they beat B.C. 9–8. On Jamison's last rock of the game, she drew to the side of the button, but Fashoway made an angle raise to the other side of the button. The rocks were too close to the pin to be measured, so an umpire had to make the decision to determine which rock was closer, and awarded the point, and the victory to Alberta. This forced a playoff between the two teams for the championship, which Alberta easily won 11–4. Jamison curled 75% in the game. The family rink broke up after the season, with Jamison retiring, citing "[t]here is too much pressure in curling", recalling the umpires decision in their round robin game against BC in the 1968 championship.

Jamison did not retire completely however, and in 1970 entered the Edmonton city senior ladies playdowns for the first time.

Jamison began wintering in Phoenix, Arizona in the early 1970s.

Jamison was named to the Edmonton Sports Hall of Fame in 1970, the Alberta Sports Hall of Fame in 1980 and the Canadian Curling Hall of Fame in 1982.

== Personal life ==
Jamison married James Renwick Jamison in 1938. They had three children, the members of her 1968 national championship curling team.
