= Gail Lee =

Canadian curler and golfer

Medal record

Women's Curling

Representing Alberta

Canadian Women's Curling Championship
Gold medal – first place	1966 North Vancouver	
Gold medal – first place	1968 St. James	
Silver medal – second place	1976 Winnipeg	

Gail Patricia Lee née Jamison (born c. 1944) is a former Canadian curler and golfer from Edmonton.

== Golf career ==
In her youth, Lee won the Alberta provincial junior girls golf championship in 1959 and 1960. Later in life, she was a member of the 2000 and 2001 senior ladies provincial team, and won the Canadian Senior Women’s Interprovincial Trophy in 2001.

== Curling career ==
Lee won the Alberta Schoolgirl championship, the fore-runner to the Alberta Junior Women's Championship in 1961 with team mates Jackie Jamison, Jean Samis and Joan Gibson. The team defeated the Southern Alberta champion Betty Plomp rink for the title two games to none in the best of three series. The event pre-dated the Canadian Junior Curling Championships by ten years.

After juniors, she teamed up with her mother Hazel Jamison, playing third on her team. The team won the 1963 Northern Alberta Ladies' Curling Association Bonspiel. Lee took over as skip for the 1966 season, with her mother opting to play third instead due to a back ailment. The team, which also included Sharon Herrington and Lee's sister June Coyle won their first Alberta women's championship in 1966. There, the team went undefeated with a 6–0 record, defeating Helen Ellis of Grande Prairie, Helen Henne of Yellowknife, Northwest Territories and Simone Flynn of Medicine Hat en route to the provincial championship. The team represented Alberta at the 1966 Diamond D Championship, Canada's national women's championship. There, Lee led her team to a perfect 9–0 record, to win the championship, the first for Alberta. Lee was about six months pregnant at the time.

Lee's mother took back skipping duties on the team, and in 1968, with Lee playing third, and sisters Jackie Spencer and June Coyle playing front end, the team won their second provincial title, defeating Bunny Sage in the Alberta final. The team represented Alberta at the 1968 Canadian Ladies Curling Association Championship. They finished the round robin with a 7–2 record, tied for first with British Columbia's Myrtle Fashoway rink. This forced a playoff between the two teams for the championship, which Alberta won 11–4. Lee curled 69.4% in the game. The family rink broke up after the season, with Jamison retiring, and Lee picking up skiing, and to raise her family.

Lee returned to competitive curling in 1970. She won a provincial mixed championship in 1973, playing third for Ron Anton. The team, which also included Warren Hansen and Anne McGarvey represented Alberta at the 1973 Canadian Mixed Curling Championship, where they finished tied for second with an 8–2 record.

Lee took the 1974 mixed season off, to have another baby.

Lee would not return to the Alberta provincial women's championship until 1976. There, she and her rink of Liz Gemmell, Anne McGarvey and sister Jackie Spencer won the championship, defeating Susan Seitz in the final. This qualified the team to represent Alberta at the 1976 Macdonald Lassies Championship, the national women's championship. The team finished the round robin tied in first place with British Columbia's Lindsay Davie rink. This forced a playoff with BC, which they lost 7–6. Lee curled just 58% to Davie's 78% in the game. After the season, the team broke up with McGarvey joining the Betty Coyle rink and Gemmell joining the Shirley Fisk team.

With a new line-up of third Marilyn Johnston, and sisters Jackie Spencer and June Coyle playing front end, Lee won her fourth Northern Alberta championship in 1977, qualifying her for the 1977 Alberta championship. The team made it to the final of the provincial championship, where they lost 3–2 to Myrna McQuarrie.

Lee qualified for her fifth provincial championship in 1981 with team mates Donna Shantz, Mona McLennan and Glenna Barry. At the provincials, they did not qualify for the finals. After the season, Lee declared she would be taking the next year off. She ultimately did not return to competitive curling.

== Personal life ==
Lee attended Ross Sheppard Composite High School in Edmonton, where she also played on the senior girls' basketball team, volleyball and swim teams, and was a member of the students' council. She also attended Victoria Composite High School. She married Kent Robert Lee in 1962.
