= Crestwood Curling Club =

Curling club in Edmonton, Alberta

- Location: 14317 96 Ave NW; Edmonton, Alberta, Canada

Information
- Established: 1954
- Club type: Dedicated ice
- Curling Canada region: No. Alberta Zone 1–6
- Sheets of ice: Six
- Rock colours: Red and Blue
- Website: http://www.crestwoodcurling.com/

The Crestwood Curling Club is a curling club located in the Crestwood neighbourhood of Edmonton, Alberta, Canada.

The club was founded in 1954 on the location of Crestwood Park in west Edmonton. On February 16, 1955 the club opened its doors, and its first feature game involved Brier champion Matt Baldwin take on Ole Olson. New additions to the club would be added in 1964. A new ice plant was added in 1981, and the club was renovated in 2004. In 2010, the club switched from a sand base to a concrete base.

The club has six sheets, and the rock colours are red and blue.

== Champions ==
The Crestwood Curling Club boasts two provincial men's, four provincial women's champion rinks, and two national women's championship teams.

Skip Tom Reed, Kevin Byrne, Tony Rankel and Lorne Reed would win the Crestwood's first men's provincial championship. That team would go on to have a 6–5 record at the 1977 Macdonald Brier. In 1979, skip Paul Devlin, John Hunter, Pat Ryan and Derek Devlin won the Crestwood's second provincial men's title. They would go on to have a 6–5 record at the 1979 Macdonald Brier.

The first women's provincial championship team from the Crestwood was in 1966 with skip Gail Lee, Hazel Jamison, Sharon Harrington and June Coyle winning not only the women's provincial title, but the national title as well. In 1968, a similar team with Jamieson skipping, and Lee, Jackie Spencer and Coyle won another provincial and national title. In 1982 and 1983, skip Cathy Shaw won back to back provincial title. Her 1982 team included Karen Jones, Sandra Rippel (Jenkins) and Donna Martineau. They went 7–3 at the 1982 Scott Tournament of Hearts and lost in a tie-breaker. Her 1983 team consisted of Christine Jurgenson, Rippel and Penny Ryan. They went 7–3 at the 1983 Scott Tournament of Hearts, and lost in the final.

In addition to the men's and women's championships, Mark Johnson, Debbie Shermack, Lorne Reed and Bonnie Lane won the 1984 provincial mixed title. In 1997, skip Ryan Keane, Scott Pfeifer, Blayne Iskiw and Peter Heck won the club's only men's provincial junior championship. They would go on to win the 1997 Canadian Junior Curling Championships and a bronze medal at the 1997 World Junior Curling Championships. The Crestwood has also won seven provincial junior women's championships. Skip Colleen McKenzie, Gail Walker, Sharon Hepburn and Corinne Proctor won in 1960. Skip Gail Jamison (Lee), Jackie Jamison, Jean Samis and Joan Gibson won in 1961. Skip Lynn Osborne, Jean Mattoch, Marge Denmore and Karen Sankey won in 1970. Skip Cathy King, Robin Ursuliak, Maureen Olsen and Mary Kay James won in 1977. They went on to win the Canadian Junior championships as well. King would repeat her provincial junior title in 1978 with Brenda Oko, Olsen and Diane Bowes. Skip Jennifer Buchanan, Janice Hawkins, Lori McLennan and Alison Tibbs won the provincial title in 1982. Buchanan would win again in 1983 with Hawkins, Debra Cutler and Tibbs. In 1971, skip Stu Pearce won the club's only men's provincial senior title with teammates Bert Palmer, Sam Stevenson and Bob Robertson. In 1991, skip Shirley Tucker would win the club's only women's provincial title with teammates Betty Jean Buchanan, Ruth Kimmitt and Lorna Priddle.

In 2012, the club won the 2012 The Dominion Curling Club Championship (men's) with skip Dan Sherrard, Brandon Klassen, Kyle Reynolds and Todd Kaasten. Sherrard won back to back national titles by repeating the following year 2013 with Brandon Klassen, Scott McClement, and Todd Kaasten.
