= 1961 Diamond D Championship =

Canadian women's curling championship

1961 Diamond "D" Championship
- Host city: Ottawa, Ontario
- Arena: Ottawa Hunt and Golf Club
- Dates: February 27– March 3
- Winner: Saskatchewan
- Curling club: Hub City CC, Saskatoon
- Skip: Joyce McKee
- Third: Sylvia Fedoruk
- Second: Barbara MacNevin
- Lead: Rose McFee

The 1961 Diamond "D" Championship was the first official Canadian women's curling championship. It was held from February 27 to March 3, 1961, at the Ottawa Hunt and Golf Club in Ottawa, Ontario. The format was a round robin, which was the same format used for the Macdonald Brier. All games in the round robin were 10 ends in length with any tiebreaker playoff games being 12 ends in length.

Team Saskatchewan, who was skipped by Joyce McKee won the inaugural event by finishing round robin play unbeaten with a 9–0 record. This would be the first of five national championships won by McKee.

Alberta, British Columbia, and New Brunswick finished round robin play tied for second with 6-3 records, necessitating a tiebreaker playoff between the three teams to determine the runner-up. Alberta beat British Columbia 10-9 in the first tiebreaker game. New Brunswick would capture the runner-up spot by defeating Alberta in the second tiebreaker playoff game 13–6.

== Teams ==
The teams are listed as follows:

Alberta	British Columbia	Manitoba	New Brunswick	Newfoundland
Edmonton CC, Edmonton Skip: Dorothy Thompson; Third: Ila Watson; Second: Vivian Kortgaard; Lead: Ruth Hayes	Nanaimo CC, Nanaimo Skip: Margaret Fuller; Third: Sylvia Koster; Second: Edna Quinney; Lead: Fernande Smith	Strathclair CC, Strathclair Skip: Irene Parker; Third: Shirley Winstone; Second: Lola Grills; Lead: Olive Gamey	Beaver CC, Moncton Skip: Mona Comeau; Third: Kay Cormack; Second: Vera Shutt; Lead: Evelyn Brooks	Grand Falls CC, Grand Falls Skip: Violet Pike; Third: Margaret Ryan; Second: Joan Baker; Lead: Ruby Tittemore
Nova Scotia	Ontario	Prince Edward Island	Quebec	Saskatchewan
Lunenburg CC, Lunenburg Skip: Mona Rhodenizer; Third: Grace Walters; Second: Margaret Jensen; Lead: Catherine Creighton	Toronto Granite Club, Toronto Skip: Emily Woolley; Third: Dadie Smith; Second: Barbara Gibson; Lead: Jane Clark	Charlottetown CC, Charlottetown Skip: Elizabeth MacDonald; Third: Sally Rodd; Second: Evelyn Goss; Lead: Nora MacDonald	Mount Royal CC, Mount Royal Skip: Helena Ellyett; Third: Annabelle MacDonald; Second: Frances Aboud; Lead: Margaret Lavery	Hub City CC, Saskatoon Skip: Joyce McKee; Third: Sylvia Fedoruk; Second: Barbara MacNevin; Lead: Rosa McFee

== Map of teams ==
Provincial Winners

== Round robin standings ==
Final Round Robin standings

Key
Diamond D champion
Teams to Tiebreaker

Province	Skip	W	L	PF	PA
Saskatchewan	Joyce McKee	9	0	88	48
Alberta	Dorothy Thompson	6	3	84	61
British Columbia	Margaret Fuller	6	3	85	64
New Brunswick	Mona Comeau	6	3	82	73
Ontario	Emily Woolley	5	4	85	65
Manitoba	Irene Parker	4	5	73	79
Quebec	Helena Ellyett	3	6	62	80
Prince Edward Island	Elizabeth MacDonald	2	7	48	88
Newfoundland	Violet Pike	2	7	68	89
Nova Scotia	Mona Rhodenizer	2	7	63	91

== Round robin results ==
All draw times are listed in Eastern Time (UTC-05:00)

=== Draw 1 ===
Monday, February 27 9:00 AM

Team	1	2	3	4	5	6	7	8	9	10	Final
Newfoundland (Pike)	1	0	0	3	0	0	1	2	0	2	9
British Columbia (Fuller)	0	2	4	0	2	3	0	0	2	0	13

Team	1	2	3	4	5	6	7	8	9	10	Final
Nova Scotia (Rhodenizer)	1	0	0	0	1	0	1	0	0	2	5
Ontario (Woolley)	0	4	1	3	0	1	0	2	1	0	12

Team	1	2	3	4	5	6	7	8	9	10	Final
Prince Edward Island (MacDonald)	1	2	1	1	1	1	3	2	0	X	12
Quebec (Ellyett)	0	0	0	0	0	0	0	0	2	X	2

Team	1	2	3	4	5	6	7	8	9	10	Final
Manitoba (Parker)	0	1	0	1	0	1	0	1	0	1	5
New Brunswick (Comeau)	1	0	3	0	2	0	5	0	1	0	12

Team	1	2	3	4	5	6	7	8	9	10	11	Final
Saskatchewan (McKee)	1	0	1	0	2	0	1	0	1	0	1	7
Alberta (Thompson)	0	0	0	1	0	2	0	1	0	2	0	6

=== Draw 2 ===
Monday, February 27 8:00 PM

Team	1	2	3	4	5	6	7	8	9	10	Final
Ontario (Woolley)	1	2	3	0	1	0	2	0	1	0	10
Quebec (Ellyett)	0	0	0	2	0	2	0	2	0	2	8

Team	1	2	3	4	5	6	7	8	9	10	Final
British Columbia (Fuller)	4	0	0	0	4	2	0	2	3	X	15
Prince Edward Island (MacDonald)	0	1	1	1	0	0	1	0	0	X	4

Team	1	2	3	4	5	6	7	8	9	10	Final
Saskatchewan (McKee)	1	0	0	0	2	0	4	0	3	1	11
Manitoba (Parker)	0	1	1	1	0	1	0	1	0	0	5

Team	1	2	3	4	5	6	7	8	9	10	11	Final
Newfoundland (Pike)	0	1	2	0	3	1	0	3	0	0	1	11
Nova Scotia (Rhodenizer)	3	0	0	1	0	0	1	0	3	2	0	10

Team	1	2	3	4	5	6	7	8	9	10	Final
Alberta (Thompson)	3	2	0	3	1	0	0	0	3	0	12
New Brunswick (Comeau)	0	0	3	0	0	1	2	1	0	2	9

=== Draw 3 ===
Tuesday, February 28 9:00 AM

Team	1	2	3	4	5	6	7	8	9	10	Final
Saskatchewan (McKee)	1	2	5	0	0	0	1	1	0	X	10
Ontario (Woolley)	0	0	0	0	2	1	0	0	1	X	4

Team	1	2	3	4	5	6	7	8	9	10	Final
Alberta (Thompson)	2	0	0	0	1	1	2	2	0	2	10
Quebec (Ellyett)	0	1	1	2	0	0	0	0	2	0	6

Team	1	2	3	4	5	6	7	8	9	10	Final
British Columbia (Fuller)	3	0	0	2	0	0	1	1	1	1	9
New Brunswick (Comeau)	0	1	1	0	1	2	0	0	0	0	5

Team	1	2	3	4	5	6	7	8	9	10	Final
Nova Scotia (Rhodenizer)	1	0	0	0	1	2	0	0	0	1	5
Manitoba (Parker)	0	3	2	1	0	0	1	3	2	0	12

Team	1	2	3	4	5	6	7	8	9	10	Final
Newfoundland (Pike)	0	1	0	0	1	0	1	1	1	0	5
Prince Edward Island (MacDonald)	2	0	1	1	0	1	0	0	0	1	6

=== Draw 4 ===
Tuesday, February 28 2:00 PM

Team	1	2	3	4	5	6	7	8	9	10	Final
Ontario (Woolley)	0	0	3	0	0	1	0	1	2	X	7
New Brunswick (Comeau)	1	2	0	2	3	0	2	0	0	X	10

Team	1	2	3	4	5	6	7	8	9	10	Final
Nova Scotia (Rhodenizer)	0	1	0	0	4	0	1	0	0	2	8
Saskatchewan (McKee)	1	0	2	0	0	2	0	3	2	0	10

Team	1	2	3	4	5	6	7	8	9	10	Final
Newfoundland (Pike)	1	0	0	2	0	1	0	1	2	0	7
Quebec (Ellyett)	0	1	1	0	2	0	3	0	0	1	8

Team	1	2	3	4	5	6	7	8	9	10	Final
Prince Edward Island (MacDonald)	0	0	1	0	0	0	1	0	0	X	2
Manitoba (Parker)	1	2	0	2	1	2	0	3	1	X	12

Team	1	2	3	4	5	6	7	8	9	10	Final
British Columbia (Fuller)	0	1	0	2	0	0	1	0	0	X	4
Alberta (Thompson)	1	0	2	0	1	1	0	5	1	X	11

=== Draw 5 ===
Wednesday, March 1 12:30 PM

Team	1	2	3	4	5	6	7	8	9	10	Final
British Columbia (Fuller)	2	3	0	0	1	1	0	0	1	0	8
Nova Scotia (Rhodenizer)	0	0	4	1	0	0	2	1	0	2	10

Team	1	2	3	4	5	6	7	8	9	10	Final
Alberta (Thompson)	0	0	0	3	1	0	3	0	4	2	13
Prince Edward Island (MacDonald)	1	1	1	0	0	1	0	1	0	0	5

Team	1	2	3	4	5	6	7	8	9	10	Final
Saskatchewan (McKee)	1	0	1	0	3	3	0	2	1	X	11
New Brunswick (Comeau)	0	1	0	1	0	0	1	0	0	X	3

Team	1	2	3	4	5	6	7	8	9	10	Final
Quebec (Ellyett)	0	2	0	1	2	0	0	2	0	2	9
Manitoba (Parker)	2	0	1	0	0	1	2	0	2	0	8

Team	1	2	3	4	5	6	7	8	9	10	Final
Newfoundland (Pike)	0	0	0	1	1	0	0	0	1	0	3
Ontario (Woolley)	2	1	1	0	0	0	1	3	0	2	10

=== Draw 6 ===
Wednesday, March 1 8:00 PM

Team	1	2	3	4	5	6	7	8	9	10	Final
Ontario (Woolley)	0	0	0	1	2	0	1	0	0	3	7
British Columbia (Fuller)	1	1	3	0	0	1	0	2	2	0	10

Team	1	2	3	4	5	6	7	8	9	10	Final
Newfoundland (Pike)	0	0	2	1	0	5	3	0	1	0	12
Manitoba (Parker)	1	2	0	0	1	0	0	2	0	2	8

Team	1	2	3	4	5	6	7	8	9	10	Final
New Brunswick (Comeau)	1	1	2	2	0	0	1	1	0	1	9
Prince Edward Island (MacDonald)	0	0	0	0	1	1	0	0	1	0	3

Team	1	2	3	4	5	6	7	8	9	10	Final
Quebec (Ellyett)	0	0	1	0	0	1	0	0	0	X	2
Saskatchewan (McKee)	1	1	0	3	1	0	0	4	1	X	11

Team	1	2	3	4	5	6	7	8	9	10	Final
Nova Scotia (Rhodenizer)	1	0	1	0	0	0	2	0	1	1	6
Alberta (Thompson)	0	1	0	1	2	3	0	3	0	0	10

=== Draw 7 ===
Thursday, March 2 9:00 AM

Team	1	2	3	4	5	6	7	8	9	10	Final
Ontario (Woolley)	1	0	0	3	1	0	0	1	0	3	9
Manitoba (Parker)	0	3	1	0	0	1	3	0	3	0	11

Team	1	2	3	4	5	6	7	8	9	10	Final
Nova Scotia (Rhodenizer)	0	1	0	0	2	1	2	1	0	0	7
New Brunswick (Comeau)	6	0	1	2	0	0	0	0	1	1	11

Team	1	2	3	4	5	6	7	8	9	10	Final
Newfoundland (Pike)	0	1	0	0	0	0	1	0	1	0	3
Alberta (Thompson)	1	0	3	1	2	1	0	2	0	1	11

Team	1	2	3	4	5	6	7	8	9	10	11	Final
Quebec (Ellyett)	1	1	0	1	3	0	0	1	0	0	0	7
British Columbia (Fuller)	0	0	1	0	0	1	1	0	3	1	1	8

Team	1	2	3	4	5	6	7	8	9	10	Final
Prince Edward Island (MacDonald)	0	0	1	0	3	0	1	1	0	1	7
Saskatchewan (McKee)	1	1	0	3	0	5	0	0	1	0	11

=== Draw 8 ===
Thursday, March 2 2:00 PM

Team	1	2	3	4	5	6	7	8	9	10	Final
Ontario (Woolley)	4	2	2	0	1	0	2	0	2	X	13
Prince Edward Island (MacDonald)	0	0	0	1	0	2	0	1	0	X	4

Team	1	2	3	4	5	6	7	8	9	10	Final
Nova Scotia (Rhodenizer)	1	1	0	0	2	0	0	0	0	0	4
Quebec (Ellyett)	0	0	2	1	0	1	3	1	2	2	12

Team	1	2	3	4	5	6	7	8	9	10	Final
Newfoundland (Pike)	2	0	0	1	0	0	4	0	4	0	11
New Brunswick (Comeau)	0	2	3	0	3	2	0	1	0	2	13

Team	1	2	3	4	5	6	7	8	9	10	Final
British Columbia (Fuller)	1	1	0	0	0	1	1	0	2	0	6
Saskatchewan (McKee)	0	0	1	1	2	0	0	2	0	1	7

Team	1	2	3	4	5	6	7	8	9	10	Final
Alberta (Thompson)	0	1	0	3	0	1	0	0	1	1	7
Manitoba (Parker)	2	0	1	0	2	0	1	2	0	0	8

=== Draw 9 ===
Thursday, March 2 8:00 PM

Team	1	2	3	4	5	6	7	8	9	10	Final
British Columbia (Fuller)	0	1	0	3	2	3	2	1	0	X	12
Manitoba (Parker)	1	0	1	0	0	0	0	0	2	X	4

Team	1	2	3	4	5	6	7	8	9	10	Final
Newfoundland (Pike)	3	0	0	0	0	1	1	0	0	2	7
Saskatchewan (McKee)	0	1	2	1	0	0	0	3	3	0	10

Team	1	2	3	4	5	6	7	8	9	10	Final
Nova Scotia (Rhodenizer)	0	1	0	1	3	1	0	1	0	1	8
Prince Edward Island (MacDonald)	1	0	1	0	0	0	2	0	1	0	5

Team	1	2	3	4	5	6	7	8	9	10	Final
Ontario (Woolley)	4	1	1	1	0	3	0	2	1	X	13
Alberta (Thompson)	0	0	0	0	2	0	2	0	0	X	4

Team	1	2	3	4	5	6	7	8	9	10	11	Final
Quebec (Ellyett)	0	0	0	2	1	1	0	2	1	1	0	8
New Brunswick (Comeau)	2	3	2	0	0	0	1	0	0	0	2	10

== Tiebreakers ==
		2nd Place
		New Brunswick	13
Alberta	10	Alberta	6
British Columbia	9

=== Round 1 ===
Friday, March 3 10:30 AM

Team	1	2	3	4	5	6	7	8	9	10	11	12	Final
Alberta (Thompson)	0	1	0	0	0	2	0	2	0	0	4	1	10
British Columbia (Fuller)	1	0	1	1	1	0	2	0	1	2	0	0	9

=== Round 2 ===
Friday, March 3 1:00 PM

Team	1	2	3	4	5	6	7	8	9	10	11	12	Final
Alberta (Thompson)	1	0	0	0	3	0	0	0	1	0	1	X	6
New Brunswick (Comeau)	0	1	4	2	0	2	1	2	0	1	0	X	13
