= 2026 Canadian Curling Club Championships =

Canadian national curling championship edition

- Host city: St. Thomas, Ontario
- Arena: St. Thomas Curling Club
- Dates: November 21–28

The 2026 Canadian Curling Club Championships are currently being held from November 21 to 28 at the St. Thomas Curling Club in St. Thomas, Ontario. The event is the Canadian championship for recreational or "club-level" curling, that is for curlers who are not currently playing at the high performance level but still enjoy competitive play and aim to represent their Province or Territory at a national championship. Each team must consist of players who did NOT participate in the 2025 Canadian Curling Club Championships, and must consist of a minimum of three players who during the previous three curling seasons did NOT participate in a Curling Canada national championship leading to a World Curling Championship (Juniors, Women's, Men's, Mixed, Seniors), an Olympic qualifying event (Pre-Trials / Trials), or a Grand Slam of Curling event.

== Men ==
=== Teams ===
The teams are listed as follows:

Team	Skip	Third	Second	Lead	Alternate	Club
Alberta	Ryan Parent	Tyler Pelkey	Russ Jennings	Mark Wood	Ron Pelkey	Calgary CC, Calgary
British Columbia	Michael Hiram	Stephen Bailey	Adam Tumilson	Enrik Gagnon		Vancouver CC, Vancouver
Manitoba	Justin Richter	Doug Hamblin	Matt Kaminski	Brendan Honkey	Sean Litke	Beausejour CC, Beausejour
New Brunswick	James Grattan	Matt Munro	Alex Peasley	Eric LeClair	Dean Grattan	Gage G&CC, Oromocto
Newfoundland and Labrador	Rod Feltham	Aaron Feltham	Ethan Davidge	Scott Davidge	Greg White	Gander CC, Gander
Northern Ontario	Bryan Burgess	Gary Weiss	Dale Wiersema	Aaron Rogalski		Fort William CC, Thunder Bay
Northwest Territories	Keith Dohey	Wyatt Scheller	Bruce Powder	Glenn Smith	Darryl Buhler	Hay River CC, Hay River
Nova Scotia	Kris Granchelli	Peter Ross	Brad Wilson	Ian Wilson		Mayflower CC, Timberlea
Ontario	Mike McCutcheon	Robert Currie	John McCutcheon	Eric Fenech		High Park Club, Toronto
Prince Edward Island	Jamie Newson	Andrew Robinson	Chris Ellis	Greg Ellis		Crapaud Community CC, Crapaud
Quebec	Michel Briand	David Robillard	Olivier Caillet	Yves Patenaude		CC Rosemère, Rosemère
Saskatchewan	Garrett Fedak	Brandon Zuravloff	Kaden Fedak	Nathan Zuchkan		Foam Lake CC, Foam Lake

=== Round robin standings ===
After Draw 2

Key
Teams to Championship Round

Pool A	Skip	W	L	W–L	LSD
Ontario	Mike McCutcheon	1	0	–	46.9
New Brunswick	James Grattan	1	0	–	60.8
Manitoba	Justin Richter	1	0	–	63.8
Northern Ontario	Bryan Burgess	0	1	–	26.7
Nova Scotia	Kris Granchelli	0	1	–	130.9
Prince Edward Island	Jamie Newson	0	1	–	204.8

Pool B	Skip	W	L	W–L	LSD
Quebec	Michel Briand	1	0	–	50.1
British Columbia	Michael Hiram	1	0	–	97.6
Alberta	Ryan Parent	1	0	–	143.5
Saskatchewan	Garrett Fedak	0	1	–	223.2
Newfoundland and Labrador	Rod Feltham	0	1	–	246.2
Northwest Territories	Keith Dohey	0	1	–	365.0

=== Round robin results ===
All draws are listed in Eastern Time (UTC−05:00).

==== Draw 2 ====
Saturday, November 21, 8:30 pm

Sheet A	1	2	3	4	5	6	7	8	Final
Quebec (Briand) 🔨	2	0	0	1	2	1	2	X	8
Saskatchewan (Fedak)	0	0	3	0	0	0	0	X	3

Sheet B	1	2	3	4	5	6	7	8	Final
New Brunswick (Grattan) 🔨	1	0	2	0	2	0	0	4	9
Nova Scotia (Granchelli)	0	2	0	2	0	0	1	0	5

Sheet C	1	2	3	4	5	6	7	8	9	Final
Newfoundland and Labrador (Feltham)	0	1	2	0	3	0	0	1	0	7
British Columbia (Hiram) 🔨	1	0	0	2	0	3	1	0	1	8

Sheet D	1	2	3	4	5	6	7	8	Final
Manitoba (Richter)	1	0	4	2	2	0	1	X	10
Northern Ontario (Burgess) 🔨	0	1	0	0	0	2	0	X	3

Sheet E	1	2	3	4	5	6	7	8	Final
Prince Edward Island (Newson)	0	3	0	0	1	0	X	X	4
Ontario (McCutcheon) 🔨	2	0	4	1	0	3	X	X	10

Sheet F	1	2	3	4	5	6	7	8	Final
Northwest Territories (Dohey)	0	0	1	0	0	1	X	X	2
Alberta (Parent) 🔨	5	2	0	3	1	0	X	X	11

==== Draw 4 ====
Sunday, November 22, 6:00 pm

Sheet A	1	2	3	4	5	6	7	8	Final
Newfoundland and Labrador (Feltham)									0
Alberta (Parent)									0

Sheet B	1	2	3	4	5	6	7	8	Final
Northern Ontario (Burgess)									0
Prince Edward Island (Newson)									0

Sheet C	1	2	3	4	5	6	7	8	Final
Saskatchewan (Fedak)									0
Northwest Territories (Dohey)									0

Sheet D	1	2	3	4	5	6	7	8	Final
New Brunswick (Grattan)									0
Ontario (McCutcheon)									0

Sheet E	1	2	3	4	5	6	7	8	Final
British Columbia (Hiram)									0
Quebec (Briand)									0

Sheet F	1	2	3	4	5	6	7	8	Final
Nova Scotia (Granchelli)									0
Manitoba (Richter)									0

==== Draw 6 ====
Monday, November 23, 6:00 pm

Sheet A	1	2	3	4	5	6	7	8	Final
Northwest Territories (Dohey)									0
British Columbia (Hiram)									0

Sheet B	1	2	3	4	5	6	7	8	Final
Alberta (Parent)									0
Saskatchewan (Fedak)									0

Sheet C	1	2	3	4	5	6	7	8	Final
Ontario (McCutcheon)									0
Northern Ontario (Burgess)									0

Sheet D	1	2	3	4	5	6	7	8	Final
Prince Edward Island (Newson)									0
Nova Scotia (Granchelli)									0

Sheet E	1	2	3	4	5	6	7	8	Final
Manitoba (Richter)									0
New Brunswick (Grattan)									0

Sheet F	1	2	3	4	5	6	7	8	Final
Quebec (Briand)									0
Newfoundland and Labrador (Feltham)									0

==== Draw 8 ====
Tuesday, November 24, 6:00 pm

Sheet A	1	2	3	4	5	6	7	8	Final
New Brunswick (Grattan)									0
Prince Edward Island (Newson)									0

Sheet B	1	2	3	4	5	6	7	8	Final
Ontario (McCutcheon)									0
Manitoba (Richter)									0

Sheet C	1	2	3	4	5	6	7	8	Final
Alberta (Parent)									0
Quebec (Briand)									0

Sheet D	1	2	3	4	5	6	7	8	Final
Newfoundland and Labrador (Feltham)									0
Northwest Territories (Dohey)									0

Sheet E	1	2	3	4	5	6	7	8	Final
Nova Scotia (Granchelli)									0
Northern Ontario (Burgess)									0

Sheet F	1	2	3	4	5	6	7	8	Final
British Columbia (Hiram)									0
Saskatchewan (Fedak)									0

==== Draw 10 ====
Wednesday, November 25, 2:00 pm

Sheet A	1	2	3	4	5	6	7	8	Final
Ontario (McCutcheon)									0
Nova Scotia (Granchelli)									0

Sheet B	1	2	3	4	5	6	7	8	Final
Quebec (Briand)									0
Northwest Territories (Dohey)									0

Sheet C	1	2	3	4	5	6	7	8	Final
Manitoba (Richter)									0
Prince Edward Island (Newson)									0

Sheet D	1	2	3	4	5	6	7	8	Final
Alberta (Parent)									0
British Columbia (Hiram)									0

Sheet E	1	2	3	4	5	6	7	8	Final
Saskatchewan (Fedak)									0
Newfoundland and Labrador (Feltham)									0

Sheet F	1	2	3	4	5	6	7	8	Final
Northern Ontario (Burgess)									0
New Brunswick (Grattan)									0

=== Placement round ===
==== Seeding pool ====
===== Standings =====
Province/Territory	Skip	W	L	W–L	LSD
		0	0	–	0.0
		0	0	–	0.0
		0	0	–	0.0
		0	0	–	0.0

===== Draw 12 =====
Thursday, November 26, 10:00 am

Sheet F	1	2	3	4	5	6	7	8	Final
									0
									0

===== Draw 13 =====
Thursday, November 26, 2:00 pm

Sheet A	1	2	3	4	5	6	7	8	Final
									0
									0

===== Draw 14 =====
Thursday, November 26, 6:00 pm

Sheet F	1	2	3	4	5	6	7	8	Final
									0
									0

===== Draw 16 =====
Friday, November 27, 2:00 pm

Sheet C	1	2	3	4	5	6	7	8	Final
									0
									0

==== Championship pool ====
===== Standings =====
Province/Territory	Skip	W	L	W–L	LSD
		0	0	–	0.0
		0	0	–	0.0
		0	0	–	0.0
		0	0	–	0.0
		0	0	–	0.0
		0	0	–	0.0
		0	0	–	0.0
		0	0	–	0.0

===== Draw 12 =====
Thursday, November 26, 10:00 am

Sheet B	1	2	3	4	5	6	7	8	Final
									0
									0

Sheet C	1	2	3	4	5	6	7	8	Final
									0
									0

Sheet D	1	2	3	4	5	6	7	8	Final
									0
									0

Sheet E	1	2	3	4	5	6	7	8	Final
									0
									0

===== Draw 14 =====
Thursday, November 26, 6:00 pm

Sheet B	1	2	3	4	5	6	7	8	Final
									0
									0

Sheet C	1	2	3	4	5	6	7	8	Final
									0
									0

Sheet D	1	2	3	4	5	6	7	8	Final
									0
									0

Sheet E	1	2	3	4	5	6	7	8	Final
									0
									0

===== Draw 15 =====
Friday, November 27, 10:00 am

Sheet E	1	2	3	4	5	6	7	8	Final
									0
									0

Sheet F	1	2	3	4	5	6	7	8	Final
									0
									0

===== Draw 16 =====
Friday, November 27, 2:00 pm

Sheet A	1	2	3	4	5	6	7	8	Final
									0
									0

Sheet B	1	2	3	4	5	6	7	8	Final
									0
									0

===== Draw 17 =====
Friday, November 27, 6:00 pm

Sheet C	1	2	3	4	5	6	7	8	Final
									0
									0

Sheet D	1	2	3	4	5	6	7	8	Final
									0
									0

Sheet E	1	2	3	4	5	6	7	8	Final
									0
									0

Sheet F	1	2	3	4	5	6	7	8	Final
									0
									0

=== Playoffs ===
Semifinals
1
4
2
3

Gold medal game
Bronze medal game

==== Semifinals ====
Saturday, November 28, 10:00 am

Sheet D	1	2	3	4	5	6	7	8	Final
									0
									0

Sheet E	1	2	3	4	5	6	7	8	Final
									0
									0

==== Bronze medal game ====
Saturday, November 28, 3:00 pm

Team	1	2	3	4	5	6	7	8	Final
									0
									0

==== Gold medal game ====
Saturday, November 28, 3:00 pm

Team	1	2	3	4	5	6	7	8	Final
									0
									0

== Women ==
=== Teams ===
The teams are listed as follows:

Team	Skip	Third	Second	Lead	Alternate	Club
Alberta	Nicky Kaufman	Erica Ortt	Tammy Cottrell	Heather Steele	Crystal Kaufman	Crestwood CC, Edmonton
British Columbia	Kelsey Powell	Falon Chretien	Alyssa Volk	Jacqui Klassen	Kalia MacKenzie	Vernon CC, Vernon
Manitoba	Kristy Mackie	Ainsley Holowec	Michelle Wadelius	Janelle Kent	Leigh Adams	St. Vital CC, Winnipeg
New Brunswick	Susie Leger	Lynn LeBlanc	Courtney Phillips	Lauren Whiteway		Curl Moncton, Moncton
Newfoundland and Labrador	Jennifer Taylor	Jennifer Gallagher	Andrea Heffernan	Michelle Taylor		St. John's CC, St. John's
Northern Ontario	Ashley Palmer	Oye-Sem Won	Corie Adamson	Michelle Bolan		Fort William CC, Thunder Bay
Northwest Territories	Judy Goucher	Kandis Jameson	Carmella Oscienny	Marilyn Taylor	Candis Carleton	Hay River CC, Hay River
Nova Scotia	Michelle Armstrong	Mary Mason	Abby Miller	Julie McEvoy		Lakeshore CC, Lower Sackville
Ontario	Susan Froud	Kristy Russell	Karin Kell	Kary Osmond		Alliston CC, Alliston
Prince Edward Island	Tammy Dewar	Sydney Carver	Chloe McGuirk	Stephanie Grills		Montague CC, Montague
Quebec	Noémie Verreault	Marie-Michèle Émond	Édith Cottenoir	Véronique Bouchard		CC Chicoutimi, Chicoutimi
Saskatchewan	Allie McMillan	Amanda Jacobson	Tara Sander	Danika Greschuk		Sutherland CC, Saskatoon

=== Round robin standings ===
After Draw 3

Key
Teams to Championship Round

Pool A	Skip	W	L	W–L	LSD
Nova Scotia	Michelle Armstrong	2	0	–	205.6
Northern Ontario	Ashley Palmer	1	1	1–0	273.0
Manitoba	Kristy Mackie	1	1	1–0	489.3
British Columbia	Kelsey Powell	1	1	0–1	325.0
Ontario	Susan Froud	1	1	0–1	433.6
Northwest Territories	Judy Goucher	0	2	–	622.1

Pool B	Skip	W	L	W–L	LSD
Quebec	Noémie Verreault	2	0	–	427.0
Alberta	Nicky Kaufman	2	0	–	548.0
Newfoundland and Labrador	Jennifer Taylor	1	1	–	272.5
Saskatchewan	Allie McMillan	1	1	–	668.2
Prince Edward Island	Tammy Dewar	0	2	–	316.7
New Brunswick	Susie Leger	0	2	–	640.0

=== Round robin results ===
All draws are listed in Eastern Time (UTC−05:00).

==== Draw 1 ====
Saturday, November 21, 4:30 pm

Sheet A	1	2	3	4	5	6	7	8	9	Final
Newfoundland and Labrador (Taylor) 🔨	2	0	0	2	0	2	0	0	1	7
New Brunswick (Leger)	0	2	1	0	1	0	1	1	0	6

Sheet B	1	2	3	4	5	6	7	8	Final
Prince Edward Island (Dewar) 🔨	1	0	1	0	1	0	0	X	3
Quebec (Verreault)	0	2	0	2	0	0	1	X	5

Sheet C	1	2	3	4	5	6	7	8	Final
Manitoba (Mackie) 🔨	0	3	2	1	0	0	0	2	8
British Columbia (Powell)	1	0	0	0	2	1	2	0	6

Sheet D	1	2	3	4	5	6	7	8	Final
Northern Ontario (Palmer)	0	1	0	3	0	0	1	X	5
Nova Scotia (Armstrong) 🔨	2	0	1	0	3	1	0	X	7

Sheet E	1	2	3	4	5	6	7	8	Final
Saskatchewan (McMillan)	0	0	1	0	0	1	0	X	2
Alberta (Kaufman) 🔨	2	1	0	1	1	0	3	X	8

Sheet F	1	2	3	4	5	6	7	8	Final
Northwest Territories (Goucher)	0	0	0	0	0	0	X	X	0
Ontario (Froud) 🔨	2	3	3	5	3	6	X	X	22

==== Draw 3 ====
Sunday, November 22, 2:00 pm

Sheet A	1	2	3	4	5	6	7	8	Final
Alberta (Kaufman)	0	0	2	2	2	2	X	X	8
Prince Edward Island (Dewar) 🔨	0	1	0	0	0	0	X	X	1

Sheet B	1	2	3	4	5	6	7	8	9	Final
Northern Ontario (Palmer) 🔨	0	2	0	2	0	0	0	1	1	6
Ontario (Froud)	0	0	2	0	0	3	0	0	0	5

Sheet C	1	2	3	4	5	6	7	8	Final
New Brunswick (Leger)	0	0	0	0	1	1	0	X	2
Saskatchewan (McMillan) 🔨	1	0	1	2	0	0	6	X	10

Sheet D	1	2	3	4	5	6	7	8	Final
British Columbia (Powell)	0	5	6	0	0	3	X	X	14
Northwest Territories (Goucher) 🔨	1	0	0	1	1	0	X	X	3

Sheet E	1	2	3	4	5	6	7	8	Final
Nova Scotia (Armstrong) 🔨	1	4	0	0	0	0	4	X	9
Manitoba (Mackie)	0	0	1	1	3	1	0	X	6

Sheet F	1	2	3	4	5	6	7	8	Final
Newfoundland and Labrador (Taylor)	0	0	0	1	0	0	X	X	1
Quebec (Verreault) 🔨	0	2	4	0	1	1	X	X	8

==== Draw 5 ====
Monday, November 23, 2:00 pm

Sheet A	1	2	3	4	5	6	7	8	Final
Northwest Territories (Goucher)									0
Nova Scotia (Armstrong)									0

Sheet B	1	2	3	4	5	6	7	8	Final
Saskatchewan (McMillan)									0
Newfoundland and Labrador (Taylor)									0

Sheet C	1	2	3	4	5	6	7	8	Final
Quebec (Verreault)									0
Alberta (Kaufman)									0

Sheet D	1	2	3	4	5	6	7	8	Final
Prince Edward Island (Dewar)									0
New Brunswick (Leger)									0

Sheet E	1	2	3	4	5	6	7	8	Final
Ontario (Froud)									0
British Columbia (Powell)									0

Sheet F	1	2	3	4	5	6	7	8	Final
Manitoba (Mackie)									0
Northern Ontario (Palmer)									0

==== Draw 7 ====
Tuesday, November 24, 2:00 pm

Sheet A	1	2	3	4	5	6	7	8	Final
Quebec (Verreault)									0
Saskatchewan (McMillan)									0

Sheet B	1	2	3	4	5	6	7	8	Final
Nova Scotia (Armstrong)									0
British Columbia (Powell)									0

Sheet C	1	2	3	4	5	6	7	8	Final
Newfoundland and Labrador (Taylor)									0
Prince Edward Island (Dewar)									0

Sheet D	1	2	3	4	5	6	7	8	Final
Ontario (Froud)									0
Manitoba (Mackie)									0

Sheet E	1	2	3	4	5	6	7	8	Final
Northern Ontario (Palmer)									0
Northwest Territories (Goucher)									0

Sheet F	1	2	3	4	5	6	7	8	Final
New Brunswick (Leger)									0
Alberta (Kaufman)									0

==== Draw 9 ====
Wednesday, November 25, 10:00 am

Sheet A	1	2	3	4	5	6	7	8	Final
British Columbia (Powell)									0
Northern Ontario (Palmer)									0

Sheet B	1	2	3	4	5	6	7	8	Final
Manitoba (Mackie)									0
Northwest Territories (Goucher)									0

Sheet C	1	2	3	4	5	6	7	8	Final
Ontario (Froud)									0
Nova Scotia (Armstrong)									0

Sheet D	1	2	3	4	5	6	7	8	Final
Alberta (Kaufman)									0
Newfoundland and Labrador (Taylor)									0

Sheet E	1	2	3	4	5	6	7	8	Final
Quebec (Verreault)									0
New Brunswick (Leger)									0

Sheet F	1	2	3	4	5	6	7	8	Final
Saskatchewan (McMillan)									0
Prince Edward Island (Dewar)									0

=== Placement round ===
==== Seeding pool ====
===== Standings =====
Province/Territory	Skip	W	L	W–L	LSD
		0	0	–	0.0
		0	0	–	0.0
		0	0	–	0.0
		0	0	–	0.0

===== Draw 12 =====
Thursday, November 26, 10:00 am

Sheet A	1	2	3	4	5	6	7	8	Final
									0
									0

===== Draw 13 =====
Thursday, November 26, 2:00 pm

Sheet F	1	2	3	4	5	6	7	8	Final
									0
									0

===== Draw 14 =====
Thursday, November 26, 6:00 pm

Sheet A	1	2	3	4	5	6	7	8	Final
									0
									0

===== Draw 16 =====
Friday, November 27, 2:00 pm

Sheet E	1	2	3	4	5	6	7	8	Final
									0
									0

==== Championship pool ====
===== Standings =====
Province/Territory	Skip	W	L	W–L	LSD
		0	0	–	0.0
		0	0	–	0.0
		0	0	–	0.0
		0	0	–	0.0
		0	0	–	0.0
		0	0	–	0.0
		0	0	–	0.0
		0	0	–	0.0

===== Draw 11 =====
Wednesday, November 25, 6:00 pm

Sheet B	1	2	3	4	5	6	7	8	Final
									0
									0

Sheet C	1	2	3	4	5	6	7	8	Final
									0
									0

Sheet D	1	2	3	4	5	6	7	8	Final
									0
									0

Sheet E	1	2	3	4	5	6	7	8	Final
									0
									0

===== Draw 13 =====
Thursday, November 26, 2:00 pm

Sheet B	1	2	3	4	5	6	7	8	Final
									0
									0

Sheet C	1	2	3	4	5	6	7	8	Final
									0
									0

Sheet D	1	2	3	4	5	6	7	8	Final
									0
									0

Sheet E	1	2	3	4	5	6	7	8	Final
									0
									0

===== Draw 15 =====
Friday, November 27, 10:00 am

Sheet A	1	2	3	4	5	6	7	8	Final
									0
									0

Sheet B	1	2	3	4	5	6	7	8	Final
									0
									0

Sheet C	1	2	3	4	5	6	7	8	Final
									0
									0

Sheet D	1	2	3	4	5	6	7	8	Final
									0
									0

===== Draw 16 =====
Friday, November 27, 2:00 pm

Sheet D	1	2	3	4	5	6	7	8	Final
									0
									0

Sheet F	1	2	3	4	5	6	7	8	Final
									0
									0

===== Draw 17 =====
Friday, November 27, 6:00 pm

Sheet A	1	2	3	4	5	6	7	8	Final
									0
									0

Sheet B	1	2	3	4	5	6	7	8	Final
									0
									0

=== Playoffs ===
Semifinals
1
4
2
3

Gold medal game
Bronze medal game

==== Semifinals ====
Saturday, November 28, 10:00 am

Sheet B	1	2	3	4	5	6	7	8	Final
									0
									0

Sheet C	1	2	3	4	5	6	7	8	Final
									0
									0

==== Bronze medal game ====
Saturday, November 28, 3:00 pm

Team	1	2	3	4	5	6	7	8	Final
									0
									0

==== Gold medal game ====
Saturday, November 28, 3:00 pm

Team	1	2	3	4	5	6	7	8	Final
									0
									0
