= Granite Curling Club =

Granite Curling Club is the name of a number of curling clubs:

== Canada ==
- CCA Granite Club - Cumberland, Ontario
- Chatham Granite Club - Chatham, Ontario
- Coaldale Granite Club - Coaldale, Alberta
- Dundas Granite Curling Club - Dundas, Ontario
- Granite Club - Toronto, Ontario
- Granite Curling Club (Edmonton) - Edmonton, Alberta
- Granite Curling Club (Winnipeg) - Winnipeg, Manitoba
- Granite Curling Club of West Ottawa - Ottawa, Ontario
- Grey Granite Club - Owen Sound, Ontario
- Horne Granite Curling Club - New Liskeard, Ontario
- Kitchener-Waterloo Granite Club - Waterloo, Ontario
- Mission Granite Curling Club - Mission, British Columbia
- North Battleford-Granite Curling Club - North Battleford, Saskatchewan
- North Bay Granite Club - North Bay, Ontario
- Penticton Granite Club - Penticton, British Columbia
- Saskatoon-Granite Curling Club - Saskatoon, Saskatchewan
- Stayner Granite Club - Stayner, Ontario
- Sturgeon Falls Granite Club - Sturgeon Falls, Ontario

== United States ==
- Granite Curling Club (Hollis) - Hollis, New Hampshire
- Granite Curling Club (Seattle) - Seattle, Washington
- Granite Curling Club of California, Inc. - Stockton, California
