= 2009 The Dominion Curling Club Championship =

- Host city: Toronto, Ontario (Etobicoke)
- Arena: St. George's Golf and Country Club
- Dates: November 25–29
- Men's winner: Ontario
- Curling club: Chatham Granite Club, Chatham
- Skip: Robert Stafford
- Third: Ben Curtis
- Second: Mark Patterson
- Lead: Ed DeSchutter
- Finalist: British Columbia
- Women's winner: Ontario
- Curling club: High Park Club, Toronto
- Skip: Kelly Cochrane
- Third: Kelly Scissons
- Second: Brenna Cochrane
- Lead: Lisa Rawlings
- Finalist: Manitoba

The 2009 Dominion Curling Club Championship was held November 25–29 at the St. George's Golf and Country Club in Etobicoke, Toronto, Ontario.

The event was the first event of its kind in Canada.

== Men's event ==
=== Grey pool ===
Team	Curling Club	Skip	W	L
Manitoba	Carberry CC	Rod Waterhouse	5	1
British Columbia	Vernon CC	Kevin Geistlinger	4	2
New Brunswick	Capital Winter	Tyler Milson	4	2
Alberta	Wetaskiwin CC	David Stewart	3	3
Northern Ontario	Port Arthur CC	Aaron Asselstine	3	3
Northwest Territories	Yellowknife CC	Chris Kelln	1	5
Yukon	Whitehorse CC	Herb Balsam	1	5

=== Blue pool ===
Team	Curling Club	Skip	W	L
Saskatchewan	Nutana CC	Shawn Joyce	6	0
Ontario	Chatham Granite	Robert Stafford	5	1
Newfoundland and Labrador	Gander CC	Scott Davidge	4	2
Nunavut	Iqaluit CC	Ed Sattelberger	3	3
Quebec	CS Belvedere	Maxime Dufresne	2	4
Nova Scotia	Greenwood CC	Doug Carpenter	1	5
Prince Edward Island	Silver Fox C&YC	Louis Walsh	0	6

=== Playoffs ===
Semi-final
G1	Manitoba	1
B2	Ontario	7
B1	Saskatchewan	5
G2	British Columbia	6

Final
B2	Ontario	7
G2	British Columbia	4

== Women's event ==
=== Grey pool ===
Team	Curling Club	Skip	W	L
Manitoba	Stonewall CC	Jackie Komyshyn	6	0
Alberta	North Hill CC	Brandi Mahaney	5	1
New Brunswick	Beaver CC	Mary McKinley	4	2
British Columbia	Penticton CC	Lil Blashko	3	3
Northern Ontario	Horne Granite CC	Patti McKnight	2	4
Yukon	Whitehorse CC	Helen Strong	1	5
Northwest Territories	Hay River CC	Deborah Stanley	0	6

=== Blue pool ===
Team	Curling Club	Skip	W	L
Ontario	High Park Club	Kelly Cochrane	5	1
Saskatchewan	Lumsden CC	Connie Fritzler	4	2
Newfoundland and Labrador	Corner Brook CA	Donna Davis	3	3
Nova Scotia	Glooscap CC	Yvonne Martin	3	3
Nunavut	Iqaluit CC	Kristy Frampton	2	4
Prince Edward Island	Crapaud CCC	Vanessa Hamming	2	4
Quebec	CC Noranda	Claire Léveillé	2	4

=== Playoffs ===
Semi-final
G1	Manitoba	8
B2	Saskatchewan	4
B1	Ontario	8
G2	Alberta	2

Final
G1	Manitoba	5
B1	Ontario	6
