= Canadian Curling Club Championships =

Annual curling tournament held in Canada

- Established: 2009
- 2026 host city: St. Thomas, Ontario
- 2026 arena: St. Thomas Curling Club

Current champions (2025)
- Men: (British Columbia) Cranbrook Curling Centre
- Women: (Ontario) Rideau Curling Club

Current edition
- 2026 Canadian Curling Club Championships

The Canadian Curling Club Championships (branded as the Everest Curling Club Championships for sponsorship reasons) is an annual curling tournament held in Canada. The tournament features the top "club level" curlers from every province and territory in Canada, plus Northern Ontario.

The first event was held in 2009. Each province and territory holds a series of playdowns where only one team per curling club is allowed an entry. Each curling club selects their teams independently with many choosing their respective club champions.

The event features only "club level" curlers. This means that top curling teams are barred from entry. Teams can only have one player who has played in a provincial men's, women's or seniors event that season or the previous season or in a Grand Slam of Curling event that year or in the previous year.

Beginning in 2023, the winning teams will play the winners of the United States Curling Club Championships in the Everest North American Curling Club Championships.

== Champions ==
Year	Men's winning club	Women's winning club	Location
2009	Chatham Granite (Chatham, Ontario)	High Park (Toronto, Ontario)	Toronto, Ontario
2010	Sutherland CC (Saskatoon, Saskatchewan)	Lethbridge CC (Lethbridge, Alberta)	Charlottetown, Prince Edward Island
2011	Red Deer CC (Red Deer, Alberta)	Granite CC (Winnipeg, Manitoba)	Richmond, British Columbia
2012	Crestwood CC (Edmonton, Alberta)	Quinte CC (Belleville, Ontario)	Toronto, Ontario
2013	Crestwood CC (Edmonton, Alberta)	Brandon CC (Brandon, Manitoba)	Thunder Bay, Ontario
2014	Nutana CC (Saskatoon, Saskatchewan)	Westmount G&CC (Kitchener, Ontario)	Halifax, Nova Scotia
2015	St. John's CC (St. John's, Newfoundland and Labrador)	Cornwall CC (Cornwall, Prince Edward Island)	Ottawa, Ontario
2016	Cataraqui G&CC (Kingston, Ontario)	Fort Rouge CC (Winnipeg, Manitoba)	Kelowna, British Columbia
2017	Nanaimo CC (Nanaimo, British Columbia)	Brandon CC (Brandon, Manitoba)	Kingston, Ontario
2018	Richmond CC (Richmond, British Columbia)	Calgary CC (Calgary, Alberta)	Miramichi, New Brunswick
2019	KW Granite (Waterloo, Ontario)	Lethbridge CC (Lethbridge, Alberta)	Leduc, Alberta
2020	Cancelled due to the COVID-19 pandemic		Ottawa, Ontario
2021	Bridgewater CC (Bridgewater, Nova Scotia)	(Northern Ontario) Fort William CC, (Thunder Bay, Ontario)	Ottawa, Ontario
2022	Richmond Hill CC (Richmond Hill, Ontario)	Curl Moncton (Moncton, New Brunswick)	Edmonton, Alberta
2023	Beaumont CC (Beaumont, Alberta)	Gage G&CC (Oromocto, New Brunswick)	Winnipeg, Manitoba
2024	Richmond Hill CC (Richmond Hill, Ontario)	Lakeshore CC (Lower Sackville, Nova Scotia)	Barrie, Ontario
2025	Cranbrook CC (Cranbrook, British Columbia)	Rideau CC (Ottawa, Ontario)	Winnipeg, Manitoba
2026	TBD	TBD	St. Thomas, Ontario
2027			Swift Current, Saskatchewan
