= 2018 Travelers Curling Club Championship =

Canadian national curling championship edition

- Host city: Miramichi, New Brunswick
- Arena: Miramichi Curling Club
- Dates: November 19–24
- Men's winner: British Columbia
- Curling club: Richmond CC, Richmond, BC
- Skip: Vic Shimizu
- Third: Cody Tanaka
- Second: Trevor Bakken
- Lead: Mark Yodogawa
- Finalist: Nova Scotia
- Women's winner: Alberta
- Curling club: Calgary CC, Calgary, AB
- Skip: Morgan Muise
- Third: Lyndsay Allen
- Second: Sarah Evans
- Lead: Sara Gartner
- Finalist: Nova Scotia

The 2018 Travelers Curling Club Championship was held from November 19 to 24 at the Miramichi Curling Club in Miramichi, New Brunswick.

== Men ==
=== Teams ===
Province	Skip	Third	Second	Lead	Locale
Alberta	Scott Garnett	Jason Wilson	Brennen Fule	Cory Campbell	Strathmore CC, Strathmore
British Columbia	Vic Shimizu	Cody Tanaka	Trevor Bakken	Mark Yodogawa	Richmond CC, Richmond
Manitoba	Andrew Wickman	Jeff Tarko	Brent Baschuk	Cameron Barth	Fort Rouge CC, Winnipeg
New Brunswick	Trevor Hanson	Chris Jenkins	Jeff Rankin	Chris Cogswell	Gage G&CC, Oromocto
Newfoundland and Labrador	Lorne Henderson	Neil Power	Scott Henderson	Dave Dawe	Re/Max Centre, St. John's
Northern Ontario	Gary Weiss	Deron Surkan	Aaron Rogalski	Mark Beazley	Port Arthur CC, Thunder Bay
Northwest Territories	Shadrach McLeod	Steve Robertson	Devon Bouillon	Rob Koehler	Yellowknife CC, Yellowknife
Nova Scotia	Kurt Roach	Mark MacNamara	Travis Stone	Robin Nathanson	Sydney CC, Sydney
Nunavut	Alex Larabie	George Mackay	Jeff Chown	Justin McDonell	Iqaluit CC, Iqaluit
Ontario	Matthew Dupuis	Terry Litchy	John King	Charles Wert	Cornwall CC (ON), Cornwall
Prince Edward Island	Jamie Newson	Corey Miller	Patrick Ramsay	Adam Arsenault	Silver Fox CC, Summerside
Quebec	Patrick Martin	Patrick Duchesneau	Matthew Sigouin	Stephane Roy	CC Laviolette, Trois-Rivières
Saskatchewan	Kory Kohuch	David Kraichy	David Schmirler	Wes Lang	Nutana CC, Saskatoon
Yukon	Jim Sias	Lee Malanchuk	Brad Wilson	Greg Thom	Whitehorse CC, Whitehorse

=== Round robin standings ===
Final standings

Key
Teams to Playoffs

==== Pool A ====
Team	W	L
Nova Scotia	5	1
Manitoba	5	1
Quebec	4	2
Alberta	3	3
Yukon	2	4
Prince Edward Island	2	4
Nunavut	0	6

==== Pool B ====
Team	W	L
British Columbia	6	0
Saskatchewan	5	1
Ontario	4	2
Northern Ontario	3	3
New Brunswick	2	4
Newfoundland and Labrador	1	5
Northwest Territories	0	6

=== Playoffs ===
Quarterfinal
B2	Saskatchewan	6
A3	Quebec	3
A2	Manitoba	4
B3	Ontario	5

Semifinal
A1	Nova Scotia	8
B2	Saskatchewan	4
B1	British Columbia	5
B3	Ontario	3

Final
A1	Nova Scotia	3
B1	British Columbia	8

Bronze medal game
B2	Saskatchewan	4
B3	Ontario	5

==== Quarterfinals ====
Friday, November 23, 1:30pm

Sheet D	1	2	3	4	5	6	7	8	Final
Saskatchewan	0	0	1	0	2	1	0	2	6
Quebec	0	0	0	1	0	0	1	0	3

Sheet E	1	2	3	4	5	6	7	8	Final
Manitoba	1	0	0	1	0	1	1	0	4
Ontario	0	2	1	0	1	0	0	1	5

==== Semifinals ====
Friday, November 23, 6:30pm

Sheet D	1	2	3	4	5	6	7	8	Final
British Columbia	2	0	1	0	1	0	0	1	5
Ontario	0	0	0	2	0	1	0	0	3

Sheet E	1	2	3	4	5	6	7	8	Final
Nova Scotia	0	3	0	1	2	0	2	X	8
Saskatchewan	2	0	1	0	0	1	0	X	4

==== Bronze medal game ====
Saturday, November 24, 10:00am

Sheet C	1	2	3	4	5	6	7	8	Final
Saskatchewan	0	2	0	0	1	0	1	0	4
Ontario	1	0	1	1	0	1	0	1	5

==== Final ====
Saturday, November 24, 10:00am

Sheet B	1	2	3	4	5	6	7	8	Final
Nova Scotia	0	0	1	0	2	0	0	X	3
British Columbia	2	1	0	3	0	1	1	X	8

== Women ==
=== Teams ===
Province	Skip	Third	Second	Lead	Locale
Alberta	Morgan Muise	Lyndsay Allen	Sarah Evans	Sara Gartner	Calgary CC, Calgary
British Columbia	Lori Olsen	Kelsey Martin	Lisa Robitaille	Andrea Bourassa	McArthur Island CC, Kamloops
Manitoba	Deb McCreanor	Trisha Hil	Michelle Buchanan	Jennifer Caweson	La Salle CC, La Salle
New Brunswick	Anouk Roy	Courtney Berry	Julia Goodin	Louise Richard	Curl Moncton, Moncton
Newfoundland and Labrador	Pam Osborne	Jennifer Gallagher	Barb Dawson	Karen Harvey	Re/Max Centre, St. John's
Northern Ontario	Kathie Jackson	Leanne Eluik	Jacquee Loerzel	Michelle McFayden	Fort Frances CC, Fort Frances
Northwest Territories	Sarah Stroeder	Alanah Jansen	Marie-Claude Savoie	Anneli Jokela	Yellowknife CC, Yellowknife
Nova Scotia	Michelle Williams	Mary Porter	Abby Miller	Kathleen Porter	Lakeshore CC, Lower Sackville
Nunavut	Chantelle Mason	Alison Griffin	Carmen Kootoo	Alison Taylor	Iqaluit CC, Iqaluit
Ontario	Stacey Hogan	Suzanne Miller	Mandy Aston	Amber-Dawn Duncan	Oshawa CC, Oshawa
Prince Edward Island	Debbie Rhodenhizer	Nancy MacFadyen	Sandra Sobey	Cindy Nicholson	Cornwall CC (PE), Cornwall
Quebec	Laura Thomas	Ann-Lise Rochon	Guelena Chanchourova	Maria Santella	Glenmore CC, Dollard-des-Ormeaux
Saskatchewan	Elaine Osmachenko	Candace Newkirk	Malysha Johnston	Sheri Logan	Moose Jaw Ford CC, Moose Jaw
Yukon	Laura Ebby	Lorna Spenner	Tamar Vandenberghe	Janine Peters	Whitehorse CC, Whitehorse

=== Round robin standings ===
Final standings

Key
Teams to Playoffs
Teams to Tiebreaker

==== Pool A ====
Team	W	L
Northwest Territories	5	1
Alberta	5	1
Saskatchewan	3	3
British Columbia	3	3
Northern Ontario	2	4
Quebec	2	4
Nunavut	1	5

==== Pool B ====
Team	W	L
Nova Scotia	4	2
Ontario	4	2
Manitoba	4	2
Newfoundland and Labrador	4	2
New Brunswick	2	4
Prince Edward Island	2	4
Yukon	1	5

=== Tiebreakers ===
- Saskatchewan 5-3 British Columbia
- Manitoba 5-3 Newfoundland and Labrador

=== Playoffs ===
Quarterfinal
A2	Alberta	7
B3	Manitoba	4
B2	Ontario	7
A3	Saskatchewan	1

Semifinal
A1	Northwest Territories	3
A2	Alberta	7
B1	Nova Scotia	6
B2	Ontario	2

Final
A2	Alberta	7
B1	Nova Scotia	3

Bronze medal game
A1	Northwest Territories	4
B2	Ontario	5

==== Quarterfinals ====
Friday, November 23, 1:30pm

Sheet B	1	2	3	4	5	6	7	8	Final
Ontario	0	2	0	0	0	3	2	X	7
Saskatchewan	0	0	0	0	1	0	0	X	1

Sheet C	1	2	3	4	5	6	7	8	Final
Alberta	2	0	2	0	2	0	1	X	7
Manitoba	0	1	0	2	0	1	0	X	4

==== Semifinals ====
Friday, November 23, 6:30pm

Sheet B	1	2	3	4	5	6	7	8	Final
Northwest Territories	1	0	0	1	0	1	0	X	3
Alberta	0	0	3	0	2	0	2	X	7

Sheet C	1	2	3	4	5	6	7	8	Final
Ontario	0	0	1	0	1	0	0	0	2
Nova Scotia	0	1	0	1	0	1	2	1	6

==== Bronze medal game ====
Saturday, November 24, 10:00am

Sheet D	1	2	3	4	5	6	7	8	Final
Northwest Territories	1	0	1	0	0	0	2	0	4
Ontario	0	1	0	1	0	0	0	3	5

==== Final ====
Saturday, November 24, 10:00am

Sheet E	1	2	3	4	5	6	7	8	Final
Alberta	3	1	0	1	0	2	0	X	7
Nova Scotia	0	0	1	0	1	0	1	X	3
