= 2010 The Dominion Curling Club Championship =

Canadian national curling championship edition

- Host city: Charlottetown and Cornwall, Prince Edward Island
- Arena: Charlottetown Curling Club and Cornwall Curling Club
- Dates: Nov. 23-28
- Men's winner: Saskatchewan
- Curling club: Sutherland CC, Saskatoon, Saskatchewan
- Skip: Darren Camm
- Third: John Carlos
- Second: Mark Steckler
- Lead: Michael Steckler
- Finalist: Ontario
- Women's winner: Alberta
- Curling club: Lethbridge CC, Lethbridge, Alberta
- Skip: Nanette Dupont
- Third: Lace Dupont
- Second: Shirley Kohuch
- Lead: Valerie Leahy
- Finalist: Saskatchewan

The 2010 Dominion Curling Club Championship was held November 23–28 at the Charlottetown and Cornwall Curling Clubs in Charlottetown and Cornwall, Prince Edward Island.

It is the second incarnation of this event.

Saskatchewan's Sutherland Curling Club won the men's event, having to win four straight games in the process after finishing the pool round in a three-way tie for second place at a 4–2 record. They defeated Ontario in the final, a team that had been undefeated until that point (including a pool victory over Saskatchewan).

Alberta's Lethbridge Curling Club won the women's event over Saskatchewan.

== Men's event ==
=== Grey pool ===
Team	Curling Club	Skip	W	L
Manitoba	Brandon CC	Steve Irwin	6	0
Alberta	Lloydminster CC	Kerry Leckie	4	2
Northern Ontario	Fort Frances CC	Raymond Roy	4	2
British Columbia	Cloverdale CC	Stu Harris	3	3
New Brunswick	Beaver CC	Barry Lewis	3	3
Northwest Territories	Fort Smith CC	Bruce McArthur	1	5
Yukon	Watson Lake CC	Jim Holt	0	6

=== Blue pool ===
Team	Curling Club	Skip	W	L
Ontario	Annandale CC	Chris Van Huyse	6	0
Nova Scotia	CFB Halifax CC	Jim Bradford	4	2
Quebec	Buckingham CC	Richard Faguy	4	2
Saskatchewan	Sutherland CC	Darren Camm	4	2
Newfoundland and Labrador	Gander CC	Scott Davidge	2	4
Prince Edward Island	Montague CC	Donald Clarey	1	5
Nunavut	Iqaluit CC	Wade Kingdon	0	6

=== Tiebreakers ===
- Alberta 8-4 Northern Ontario
- Saskatchewan 6-2 Quebec
- Saskatchewan 9-6 Nova Scotia

=== Playoffs ===
Semi-final
G1	Manitoba	5
B2	Saskatchewan	6
B1	Ontario	6
G2	Alberta	3

Final
B2	Saskatchewan	6
B1	Ontario	5

== Women's event ==
=== Grey pool ===
Team	Curling Club	Skip	W	L
Alberta	Lethbridge CC	Nanette Dupont	5	1
Manitoba	Brandon CC	Stacey Fordyce	5	1
New Brunswick	Capital WC	Shelly Graham	3	3
Northern Ontario	Coniston CC	Melanie Patry	3	3
British Columbia	Cloverdale CC	Cory McLaughlin	2	4
Yukon	Whitehorse CC	Nicole Baldwin	2	4
Northwest Territories	Hay River CC	Monique Gagnier	1	5

=== Blue pool ===
Team	Curling Club	Skip	W	L
Saskatchewan	Kerrobert CC	Darlene Gillies	5	1
Nova Scotia	Windsor CC	Courtney Smith	4	2
Ontario	Chinguacousy CC	Susan Burnside	4	2
Prince Edward Island	Silver Fox C&YC	Kim Aylward	3	3
Newfoundland and Labrador	Remax Centre	Pam Osborne	2	4
Nunavut	Iqaluit CC	Kristy Frampton	2	4
Quebec	Baie-d'Urfé CC	Maureen Horan	1	5

=== Tiebreaker ===
- Nova Scotia 6-4 Ontario

=== Playoffs ===
Semi-final
G1	Alberta	8
B2	Nova Scotia	3
B1	Saskatchewan	7
G2	Manitoba	1

Final
G1	Alberta	9
B1	Saskatchewan	4
