= 2021 Canadian Curling Club Championships =

Canadian national curling championship edition

- Host city: Ottawa, Ontario
- Arena: Ottawa Hunt and Golf Club
- Dates: November 29 – December 4
- Men's winner: Nova Scotia
- Curling club: Bridgewater CC, Bridgewater
- Skip: Nicholas Deagle
- Third: Jason van Vonderen
- Second: Robert Phillips
- Lead: Ryan Sperry
- Finalist: Saskatchewan (Sutherland CC)
- Women's winner: Northern Ontario
- Curling club: Fort William CC, Thunder Bay
- Skip: Tracey Larocque
- Third: Samantha Morris
- Second: Corie Adamson
- Lead: Rebecca Carr
- Finalist: Ontario (York CC)

The 2021 Everest Canadian Curling Club Championships were held from November 29 to December 4 at the Ottawa Hunt and Golf Club in Ottawa, Ontario.

== Men ==
=== Teams ===
The teams are listed as follows:

Team	Skip	Third	Second	Lead	Alternate	Club
Alberta	Glen Hansen	Duane Wright	Shaughn Lalonde	Brent Fellows		Hinton CC, Hinton
British Columbia	Darren Frycz	Michael Sitter	Don Monk	Steve Claxton		Langley CC, Langley
Manitoba	Trevor Loreth	Brad Haight	Ryan Lowdon	Brett Cawson		Granite CC, Winnipeg
New Brunswick	Michael Dobson	Bill Gates	Mark McKinnon	Dan MacDonald	Claude Moore	Thistle-St. Andrews CC, Saint John
Newfoundland and Labrador	Mark Noseworthy	Steve Bragg	Randy Turpin	Steve Routledge		RE/MAX Centre, St. John's
Northern Ontario	Josh Hales	Kevin Macmichael	Kevin Morin	Hunter Schmacher	Ethan Bowman	Community First CC, Sault Ste. Marie
Northwest Territories	Mark Robertson	Nick Saturnino	Michael Fraser	Glen Tingmiak		Inuvik CC, Inuvik
Nova Scotia	Nick Deagle	Jason vanVonderen	Rob Phillips	Ryan Sperry		Bridgewater CC, Bridgewater
Nunavut	Wade Kingdon	Peter Van Strien	Hunter Tootoo	Justin McDonnell		Iqaluit CC, Iqaluit
Ontario	Adam Spencer	Greg Robinson	Jeff Robinson	Steve Anderson		Guelph CC, Guelph
Prince Edward Island	Darren Higgins	Tim Hockin	Mike Spencer	Jonathan Greenan		Silver Fox CC, Summerside
Quebec	Philippe Ménard	Dany Deschamps	Marc Dugas	Daniel Elie	Simon Deveault	Curling Mont-Bruno, Saint-Bruno-de-Montarville
Saskatchewan	Dean Grindheim	Mike Steckler	Mark Steckler	Jack Brower		Sutherland CC, Saskatoon
Yukon	Dustin Mikkelsen	Brandon Hagen	Robert Mckinnon	Jamie Steeves		Whitehorse CC, Whitehorse

=== Round-robin standings ===
Final round-robin standings

Key
Teams to Championship Round

Pool A	Skip	W	L
Saskatchewan	Dean Grindheim	5	1
Ontario	Adam Spencer	5	1
Prince Edward Island	Darren Higgins	4	2
Quebec	Philippe Ménard	4	2
Alberta	Glen Hansen	2	4
Yukon	Dustin Mikkelsen	1	5
Nunavut	Wade Kingdon	0	6

Pool B	Skip	W	L
Manitoba	Trevor Loreth	6	0
British Columbia	Darren Frycz	4	2
Newfoundland and Labrador	Mark Noseworthy	4	2
Nova Scotia	Nick Deagle	3	3
Northwest Territories	Mark Robertson	2	4
New Brunswick	Michael Dobson	2	4
Northern Ontario	Josh Hales	0	6

=== Round-robin results ===
All draws are listed in Eastern Time (UTC−05:00).

==== Draw 2 ====
Monday, November 29, 7:30 pm

Sheet 1	1	2	3	4	5	6	7	8	Final
Nunavut (Kingdon)	0	0	0	1	1	1	1	0	4
Prince Edward Island (Higgins)	2	0	2	0	0	0	0	3	7

Sheet 2	1	2	3	4	5	6	7	8	Final
Nova Scotia (Deagle)	0	2	1	0	1	1	0	X	5
New Brunswick (Dobson)	1	0	0	1	0	0	1	X	3

Sheet 3	1	2	3	4	5	6	7	8	Final
Ontario (Spencer)	0	1	1	0	0	1	0	1	4
Quebec (Ménard)	1	0	0	1	0	0	1	0	3

Sheet 4	1	2	3	4	5	6	7	8	Final
Manitoba (Loreth)	0	2	0	3	0	2	1	X	8
Newfoundland and Labrador (Noseworthy)	2	0	2	0	1	0	0	X	5

Sheet 5	1	2	3	4	5	6	7	8	Final
Yukon (Mikkelsen)	1	0	0	0	0	0	X	X	1
Saskatchewan (Grindheim)	0	2	3	1	2	2	X	X	10

Sheet 6	1	2	3	4	5	6	7	8	Final
Northwest Territories (Robertson)	0	2	0	1	1	1	0	X	5
Northern Ontario (Hales)	0	0	0	0	0	0	1	X	1

==== Draw 3 ====
Tuesday, November 30, 9:00 am

Sheet 2	1	2	3	4	5	6	7	8	Final
Alberta (Hansen)	0	1	0	0	0	0	0	X	1
Ontario (Spencer)	0	0	2	1	0	1	1	X	5

Sheet 4	1	2	3	4	5	6	7	8	Final
Prince Edward Island (Higgins)	0	1	0	1	0	0	2	0	4
Saskatchewan (Grindheim)	1	0	1	0	1	1	0	1	5

Sheet 6	1	2	3	4	5	6	7	8	Final
Nunavut (Kingdon)	1	0	0	0	1	0	2	X	4
Yukon (Mikkelsen)	0	1	2	0	0	4	0	X	7

==== Draw 4 ====
Tuesday, November 30, 12:30 pm

Sheet 1	1	2	3	4	5	6	7	8	Final
Northern Ontario (Hales)	2	0	0	1	0	1	0	X	4
Newfoundland and Labrador (Noseworthy)	0	2	3	0	4	0	3	X	12

Sheet 3	1	2	3	4	5	6	7	8	Final
New Brunswick (Dobson)	3	0	2	2	1	0	X	X	8
British Columbia (Frycz)	0	2	0	0	0	1	X	X	3

Sheet 5	1	2	3	4	5	6	7	8	Final
Northwest Territories (Robertson)	0	2	0	0	0	0	1	X	3
Manitoba (Loreth)	1	0	2	1	2	1	0	X	7

==== Draw 5 ====
Tuesday, November 30, 4:00 pm

Sheet 2	1	2	3	4	5	6	7	8	Final
Quebec (Ménard)	3	0	0	4	0	3	X	X	10
Nunavut (Kingdon)	0	0	1	0	1	0	X	X	2

Sheet 4	1	2	3	4	5	6	7	8	Final
Ontario (Spencer)	0	0	0	0	3	0	3	X	6
Yukon (Mikkelsen)	0	1	0	1	0	1	0	X	3

Sheet 6	1	2	3	4	5	6	7	8	Final
Saskatchewan (Grindheim)	0	2	0	2	0	1	0	3	8
Alberta (Hansen)	1	0	3	0	1	0	1	0	6

==== Draw 6 ====
Tuesday, November 30, 7:30 pm

Sheet 1	1	2	3	4	5	6	7	8	Final
British Columbia (Frycz)	3	1	3	2	0	0	X	X	9
Northwest Territories (Robertson)	0	0	0	0	1	2	X	X	3

Sheet 3	1	2	3	4	5	6	7	8	Final
Newfoundland and Labrador (Noseworthy)	0	2	0	3	0	2	1	X	8
Nova Scotia (Deagle)	0	0	2	0	2	0	0	X	4

Sheet 5	1	2	3	4	5	6	7	8	Final
Northern Ontario (Hales)	0	0	2	0	1	3	0	X	6
New Brunswick (Dobson)	3	2	0	1	0	0	5	X	11

==== Draw 7 ====
Wednesday, December 1, 9:00 am

Sheet 1	1	2	3	4	5	6	7	8	Final
Alberta (Hansen)	0	0	2	0	0	1	1	X	4
Nunavut (Kingdon)	0	0	0	1	0	0	0	X	1

Sheet 3	1	2	3	4	5	6	7	8	Final
Prince Edward Island (Higgins)	0	0	1	0	0	0	X	X	1
Ontario (Spencer)	0	4	0	3	3	1	X	X	11

Sheet 5	1	2	3	4	5	6	7	8	Final
Saskatchewan (Grindheim)	0	1	1	0	0	1	1	0	4
Quebec (Ménard)	3	0	0	1	2	0	0	1	7

==== Draw 8 ====
Wednesday, December 1, 12:30 pm

Sheet 2	1	2	3	4	5	6	7	8	Final
Northwest Territories (Robertson)	0	3	0	0	0	0	X	X	3
Newfoundland and Labrador (Noseworthy)	2	0	2	2	3	3	X	X	12

Sheet 4	1	2	3	4	5	6	7	8	Final
Nova Scotia (Deagle)	0	2	0	5	1	2	X	X	10
Northern Ontario (Hales)	0	0	1	0	0	0	X	X	1

Sheet 6	1	2	3	4	5	6	7	8	Final
Manitoba (Loreth)	0	2	2	0	2	0	3	X	9
British Columbia (Frycz)	0	0	0	1	0	2	0	X	3

==== Draw 9 ====
Wednesday, December 1, 4:00 pm

Sheet 1	1	2	3	4	5	6	7	8	Final
Yukon (Mikkelsen)	1	0	1	1	0	2	0	X	5
Quebec (Ménard)	0	5	0	0	4	0	2	X	11

Sheet 3	1	2	3	4	5	6	7	8	Final
Nunavut (Kingdon)	0	0	0	1	0	1	X	X	2
Saskatchewan (Grindheim)	3	2	1	0	3	0	X	X	9

Sheet 5	1	2	3	4	5	6	7	8	Final
Alberta (Hansen)	0	0	1	0	2	0	0	0	3
Prince Edward Island (Higgins)	1	1	0	1	0	0	2	2	7

==== Draw 10 ====
Wednesday, December 1, 7:30 pm

Sheet 2	1	2	3	4	5	6	7	8	Final
New Brunswick (Dobson)	0	0	1	0	1	0	1	X	3
Manitoba (Loreth)	1	2	0	2	0	1	0	X	6

Sheet 4	1	2	3	4	5	6	7	8	Final
Newfoundland and Labrador (Noseworthy)	1	0	0	2	0	2	0	0	5
British Columbia (Frycz)	0	1	1	0	2	0	1	2	7

Sheet 6	1	2	3	4	5	6	7	8	Final
Nova Scotia (Deagle)	0	2	0	2	0	2	1	1	8
Northwest Territories (Robertson)	1	0	2	0	2	0	0	0	5

==== Draw 11 ====
Thursday, December 2, 9:00 am

Sheet 1	1	2	3	4	5	6	7	8	Final
Manitoba (Loreth)	0	1	0	0	0	1	1	0	3
Nova Scotia (Deagle)	1	0	1	0	0	0	0	1	3

Sheet 2	1	2	3	4	5	6	7	8	Final
British Columbia (Frycz)	1	0	1	0	3	1	5	X	11
Northern Ontario (Hales)	0	1	0	1	0	0	0	X	2

Sheet 3	1	2	3	4	5	6	7	8	Final
Yukon (Mikkelsen)	2	0	0	0	0	0	0	X	2
Alberta (Hansen)	0	2	1	0	1	1	1	X	6

Sheet 4	1	2	3	4	5	6	7	8	Final
New Brunswick (Dobson)	0	0	1	0	0	3	0	0	4
Northwest Territories (Robertson)	0	2	0	1	1	0	0	1	5

Sheet 5	1	2	3	4	5	6	7	8	Final
Ontario (Spencer)	3	0	2	1	0	2	0	X	8
Nunavut (Kingdon)	0	1	0	0	2	0	1	X	4

Sheet 6	1	2	3	4	5	6	7	8	Final
Quebec (Ménard)	0	1	0	3	0	1	0	X	5
Prince Edward Island (Higgins)	1	0	1	0	2	0	3	X	7

==== Draw 13 ====
Thursday, December 2, 4:00 pm

Sheet 1	1	2	3	4	5	6	7	8	9	Final
Saskatchewan (Grindheim)	0	0	0	1	2	0	3	0	1	7
Ontario (Spencer)	0	2	0	0	0	2	0	2	0	6

Sheet 2	1	2	3	4	5	6	7	8	Final
Prince Edward Island (Higgins)	1	0	0	2	1	0	2	0	6
Yukon (Mikkelsen)	0	1	1	0	0	2	0	1	5

Sheet 3	1	2	3	4	5	6	7	8	9	Final
Northern Ontario (Hales)	0	0	1	1	0	1	0	1	0	4
Manitoba (Loreth)	1	1	0	0	1	0	1	0	3	7

Sheet 4	1	2	3	4	5	6	7	8	Final
Quebec (Ménard)	3	0	0	2	0	1	1	X	7
Alberta (Hansen)	0	0	2	0	1	0	0	X	3

Sheet 5	1	2	3	4	5	6	7	8	Final
British Columbia (Frycz)	3	0	0	1	0	2	1	X	7
Nova Scotia (Deagle)	0	3	0	0	1	0	0	X	4

Sheet 6	1	2	3	4	5	6	7	8	Final
Newfoundland and Labrador (Noseworthy)	0	1	2	2	1	3	X	X	9
New Brunswick (Dobson)	1	0	0	0	0	0	X	X	1

=== Championship round ===
==== A Bracket ====
Qualifier 1
A1	Saskatchewan	6
B4	Nova Scotia	8
B4	Nova Scotia	4
A3	Prince Edward Island	10
B2	British Columbia	3
A3	Prince Edward Island	6

Qualifier 2
B1	Manitoba	4
A4	Quebec	8
A4	Quebec	3
A2	Ontario	6
A2	Ontario	10
B3	Newfoundland and Labrador	3

==== B Bracket ====
			Qualifier 3
			A4	Quebec	6
A1	Saskatchewan	7	A1	Saskatchewan	7
B2	British Columbia	3

			Qualifier 4
			B4	Nova Scotia	6
B1	Manitoba	7	B1	Manitoba	3
B3	Newfoundland and Labrador	3

==== A Event ====
===== Semifinals =====
Friday, December 3, 9:00 am

Sheet 1	1	2	3	4	5	6	7	8	Final
British Columbia (Frycz)	0	1	0	1	1	0	0	X	3
Prince Edward Island (Higgins)	2	0	1	0	0	2	1	X	6

Sheet 2	1	2	3	4	5	6	7	8	Final
Ontario (Spencer)	2	0	4	1	3	0	X	X	10
Newfoundland and Labrador (Noseworthy)	0	1	0	0	0	2	X	X	3

Sheet 3	1	2	3	4	5	6	7	8	Final
Saskatchewan (Grindheim)	1	1	1	0	0	0	3	0	6
Nova Scotia (Deagle)	0	0	0	2	2	1	0	3	8

Friday, December 3, 12:30 pm

Sheet 6	1	2	3	4	5	6	7	8	Final
Manitoba (Loreth)	0	1	0	1	1	0	1	X	4
Quebec (Ménard)	0	0	5	0	0	3	0	X	8

===== Finals =====
Friday, December 3, 12:30 pm

Sheet 5	1	2	3	4	5	6	7	8	Final
Nova Scotia (Deagle)	0	2	0	0	0	2	0	X	4
Prince Edward Island (Higgins)	3	0	2	3	1	0	1	X	10

Friday, December 3, 4:00 pm

Sheet 3	1	2	3	4	5	6	7	8	Final
Quebec (Ménard)	0	2	0	0	0	1	0	0	3
Ontario (Spencer)	1	0	0	2	1	0	1	1	6

==== B Event ====
===== Semifinals =====
Friday, December 3, 12:30 pm

Sheet 4	1	2	3	4	5	6	7	8	Final
Saskatchewan (Grindheim)	3	0	1	0	1	0	2	X	7
British Columbia (Frycz)	0	1	0	1	0	1	0	X	3

Friday, December 3, 4:00 pm

Sheet 1	1	2	3	4	5	6	7	8	Final
Manitoba (Loreth)	0	2	2	0	2	1	0	X	7
Newfoundland and Labrador (Noseworthy)	0	0	0	2	0	0	1	X	3

===== Finals =====
Friday, December 3, 7:30 pm

Sheet 4	1	2	3	4	5	6	7	8	Final
Nova Scotia (Deagle)	0	0	2	1	3	0	0	X	6
Manitoba (Loreth)	0	1	0	0	0	1	1	X	3

Sheet 6	1	2	3	4	5	6	7	8	9	Final
Quebec (Ménard)	0	0	0	1	0	3	0	2	0	6
Saskatchewan (Grindheim)	0	1	1	0	3	0	1	0	1	7

=== Playoffs ===
Semifinals
1	Prince Edward Island	2
4	Nova Scotia	5
2	Ontario	6
3	Saskatchewan	10

Final
4	Nova Scotia	3
3	Saskatchewan	2

Bronze medal game
1	Prince Edward Island	4
2	Ontario	10

==== Semifinals ====
Saturday, December 4, 9:00 am

Sheet 1	1	2	3	4	5	6	7	8	Final
Ontario (Spencer)	0	2	0	3	0	0	1	X	6
Saskatchewan (Grindheim)	3	0	4	0	3	0	0	X	10

Sheet 3	1	2	3	4	5	6	7	8	Final
Prince Edward Island (Higgins)	0	1	0	0	0	1	0	X	2
Nova Scotia (Deagle)	2	0	0	1	1	0	1	X	5

==== Bronze medal game ====
Saturday, December 4, 2:00 pm

Sheet 6	1	2	3	4	5	6	7	8	Final
Ontario (Spencer)	3	0	0	0	2	0	5	X	10
Prince Edward Island (Higgins)	0	0	0	2	0	2	0	X	4

==== Gold medal game ====
Saturday, December 4, 2:00 pm

Sheet 4	1	2	3	4	5	6	7	8	Final
Nova Scotia (Deagle)	0	1	0	0	0	1	0	1	3
Saskatchewan (Grindheim)	1	0	0	0	0	0	1	0	2

== Women ==
=== Teams ===
The teams are listed as follows:

Team	Skip	Third	Second	Lead	Club
Alberta	Tiffany Steuber	Brittany Martin	Jen Person	Brittany Zelmer	Spruce Grove CC, Spruce Grove
British Columbia	Penny Shantz	Tina Chestnut	Nicole Guizzo	Nancy Betteridge	Parksville CC, Parksville
Manitoba	Deb McCreanor	Trisha Hill	Michelle Buchanan	Jennifer Cawson	La Salle CC, La Salle
New Brunswick	Julia Goodin	Courtney Phillips	Michelle Majeau	Laurie Donaher	Curl Moncton, Moncton
Newfoundland and Labrador	Jennifer Taylor (Fourth)	Andrea Heffernan	Noelle Thomas-Kennell	Leslie Anne Walsh (Skip)	RE/MAX Centre, St. John's
Northern Ontario	Tracey Larocque	Samantha Morris	Corie Adamson	Rebecca Carr	Fort William CC, Thunder Bay
Northwest Territories	Stacey Stabel	Krista Wesley	Jill Andrews	Alison Davis	Yellowknife CC, Yellowknife
Nova Scotia	Celina Thompson	Mandy Grace	Cathy Donald	Sarah Kennie	Mayflower CC, Halifax
Nunavut	Denise Hutchings	Megan Ingram	Alison Taylor	Aloka Wijesooriya	Iqaluit CC, Iqaluit
Ontario	Laurie Shields	Lisa Rolfe	Samantha Fuller	Nadine Simpson	York CC, Newmarket
Prince Edward Island	Shelly Bradley	Amanda Power	Aleya Quilty	Jodi Murphy	Charlottetown CC, Charlottetown
Quebec	Cyntia Plouffe	Julie St-Laurent	France Riopel	Lucienne Boucher	Buckingham CC, Buckingham
Saskatchewan	Elaine Robson	Candace Newkirk	Malysha Johnstone	Sheri Logan	Moose Jaw CC, Moose Jaw
Yukon	Laura Eby	Lorna Spencer	Tamar Vandenberghe	Laura Williamson	Whitehorse CC, Whitehorse

=== Round-robin standings ===
Final round-robin standings

Key
Teams to Championship Round

Pool A	Skip	W	L
Alberta	Tiffany Steuber	6	0
Northern Ontario	Tracey Larocque	5	1
Manitoba	Deb McCreanor	3	3
Prince Edward Island	Shelly Bradley	3	3
Saskatchewan	Elaine Robson	2	4
Newfoundland and Labrador	Leslie Anne Walsh	1	5
Nunavut	Denise Hutchings	1	5

Pool B	Skip	W	L
Ontario	Laurie Sheilds	5	1
New Brunswick	Julia Goodin	4	2
Nova Scotia	Celina Thompson	4	2
Yukon	Laura Eby	3	3
Quebec	Cyntia Plouffe	3	3
Northwest Territories	Stacey Stabel	1	5
British Columbia	Penny Shantz	1	5

=== Round-robin results ===
All draws are listed in Eastern Time (UTC−05:00).

==== Draw 1 ====
Monday, November 29, 3:00 pm

Sheet 1	1	2	3	4	5	6	7	8	Final
Nunavut (Hutchings)	0	1	0	0	0	1	0	X	2
Northern Ontario (Larocque)	2	0	1	1	2	0	3	X	9

Sheet 2	1	2	3	4	5	6	7	8	Final
Ontario (Sheilds)	1	2	0	1	2	2	4	X	12
Northwest Territories (Stabel)	0	0	2	0	0	0	0	X	2

Sheet 3	1	2	3	4	5	6	7	8	Final
Alberta (Steuber)	0	0	3	0	2	0	3	X	8
Saskatchewan (Robson)	0	0	0	1	0	1	0	X	2

Sheet 4	1	2	3	4	5	6	7	8	Final
British Columbia (Shantz)	1	0	1	0	0	1	0	X	3
New Brunswick (Goodin)	0	1	0	3	1	0	4	X	9

Sheet 5	1	2	3	4	5	6	7	8	Final
Newfoundland and Labrador (Walsh)	0	1	1	1	0	0	1	0	4
Manitoba (McCreanor)	2	0	0	0	2	2	0	1	7

Sheet 6	1	2	3	4	5	6	7	8	Final
Yukon (Eby)	0	3	0	1	0	4	1	1	10
Quebec (Plouffe)	1	0	3	0	3	0	0	0	7

==== Draw 3 ====
Tuesday, November 30, 9:00 am

Sheet 1	1	2	3	4	5	6	7	8	Final
Quebec (Plouffe)	2	0	2	0	2	1	1	0	8
New Brunswick (Goodin)	0	4	0	2	0	0	0	0	6

Sheet 3	1	2	3	4	5	6	7	8	Final
Northwest Territories (Stabel)	2	1	0	0	1	0	0	0	4
Nova Scotia (Thompson)	0	0	0	1	0	1	2	2	6

Sheet 5	1	2	3	4	5	6	7	8	Final
Yukon (Eby)	1	0	1	0	1	1	1	1	6
British Columbia (Shantz)	0	1	0	2	0	0	0	0	3

==== Draw 4 ====
Tuesday, November 30, 12:30 pm

Sheet 2	1	2	3	4	5	6	7	8	Final
Prince Edward Island (Bradley)	0	0	1	0	0	2	0	X	3
Alberta (Steuber)	3	0	0	1	2	0	4	X	10

Sheet 4	1	2	3	4	5	6	7	8	Final
Northern Ontario (Larocque)	1	0	0	2	3	1	1	X	8
Manitoba (McCreanor)	0	0	2	0	0	0	0	X	2

Sheet 6	1	2	3	4	5	6	7	8	Final
Nunavut (Hutchings)	0	1	0	2	1	0	0	X	4
Newfoundland and Labrador (Walsh)	3	0	1	0	0	3	1	X	8

==== Draw 5 ====
Tuesday, November 30, 4:00 pm

Sheet 1	1	2	3	4	5	6	7	8	Final
Nova Scotia (Thompson)	0	0	2	0	3	0	3	X	8
Yukon (Eby)	1	1	0	1	0	1	0	X	4

Sheet 3	1	2	3	4	5	6	7	8	Final
New Brunswick (Goodin)	0	0	2	0	0	0	1	0	3
Ontario (Sheilds)	1	0	0	2	0	2	0	1	6

Sheet 5	1	2	3	4	5	6	7	8	9	Final
Quebec (Plouffe)	1	0	1	0	1	1	1	0	1	6
Northwest Territories (Stabel)	0	2	0	2	0	0	0	1	0	5

==== Draw 6 ====
Tuesday, November 30, 7:30 pm

Sheet 2	1	2	3	4	5	6	7	8	Final
Saskatchewan (Robson)	1	1	0	1	1	4	X	X	8
Nunavut (Hutchings)	0	0	1	0	0	0	X	X	1

Sheet 4	1	2	3	4	5	6	7	8	Final
Alberta (Steuber)	1	0	0	4	1	0	1	X	7
Newfoundland and Labrador (Walsh)	0	2	1	0	0	1	0	X	4

Sheet 6	1	2	3	4	5	6	7	8	Final
Manitoba (McCreanor)	1	0	0	1	3	0	1	1	7
Prince Edward Island (Bradley)	0	2	0	0	0	2	0	0	4

==== Draw 7 ====
Wednesday, December 1, 9:00 am

Sheet 2	1	2	3	4	5	6	7	8	Final
Yukon (Eby)	0	0	0	1	0	1	0	X	2
New Brunswick (Goodin)	0	1	2	0	1	0	1	X	5

Sheet 4	1	2	3	4	5	6	7	8	Final
Ontario (Sheilds)	0	2	0	4	3	0	X	X	9
Quebec (Plouffe)	1	0	1	0	0	1	X	X	3

Sheet 6	1	2	3	4	5	6	7	8	Final
British Columbia (Shantz)	0	1	0	1	0	2	0	3	7
Nova Scotia (Thompson)	1	0	3	0	1	0	1	0	6

==== Draw 8 ====
Wednesday, December 1, 12:30 pm

Sheet 1	1	2	3	4	5	6	7	8	Final
Prince Edward Island (Bradley)	4	4	0	1	0	2	X	X	11
Nunavut (Hutchings)	0	0	1	0	1	0	X	X	2

Sheet 3	1	2	3	4	5	6	7	8	Final
Northern Ontario (Larocque)	0	1	0	0	0	1	0	X	2
Alberta (Steuber)	2	0	2	1	1	0	3	X	9

Sheet 5	1	2	3	4	5	6	7	8	Final
Manitoba (McCreanor)	0	0	0	1	1	0	0	3	5
Saskatchewan (Robson)	0	1	1	0	0	0	2	0	4

==== Draw 9 ====
Wednesday, December 1, 4:00 pm

Sheet 2	1	2	3	4	5	6	7	8	Final
Northwest Territories (Stabel)	1	0	2	0	3	0	0	1	7
British Columbia (Shantz)	0	1	0	1	0	2	1	0	5

Sheet 4	1	2	3	4	5	6	7	8	Final
New Brunswick (Goodin)	0	3	0	2	0	2	0	1	8
Nova Scotia (Thompson)	0	0	3	0	1	0	3	0	7

Sheet 6	1	2	3	4	5	6	7	8	Final
Ontario (Sheilds)	0	0	4	1	0	0	1	X	6
Yukon (Eby)	1	1	0	0	0	1	0	X	3

==== Draw 10 ====
Wednesday, December 1, 7:30 pm

Sheet 1	1	2	3	4	5	6	7	8	Final
Newfoundland and Labrador (Walsh)	0	0	1	0	0	1	1	X	3
Saskatchewan (Robson)	2	1	0	3	1	0	0	X	7

Sheet 3	1	2	3	4	5	6	7	8	Final
Nunavut (Hutchings)	1	0	0	2	2	0	2	1	8
Manitoba (McCreanor)	0	0	2	0	0	2	0	0	4

Sheet 5	1	2	3	4	5	6	7	8	Final
Prince Edward Island (Bradley)	1	1	0	1	0	0	1	0	4
Northern Ontario (Larocque)	0	0	1	0	0	1	0	3	5

==== Draw 12 ====
Thursday, December 2, 12:30 pm

Sheet 1	1	2	3	4	5	6	7	8	Final
British Columbia (Shantz)	1	0	0	0	0	2	X	X	3
Ontario (Sheilds)	0	2	3	2	1	0	X	X	8

Sheet 2	1	2	3	4	5	6	7	8	Final
Nova Scotia (Thompson)	6	1	0	0	0	1	0	X	8
Quebec (Plouffe)	0	0	1	1	1	0	1	X	4

Sheet 3	1	2	3	4	5	6	7	8	Final
Newfoundland and Labrador (Walsh)	0	1	0	0	0	0	2	0	3
Prince Edward Island (Bradley)	0	0	1	1	1	1	0	2	6

Sheet 4	1	2	3	4	5	6	7	8	Final
Northwest Territories (Stabel)	0	0	1	0	1	1	2	0	5
Yukon (Eby)	2	3	0	1	0	0	0	1	7

Sheet 5	1	2	3	4	5	6	7	8	Final
Alberta (Steuber)	0	0	3	5	2	5	X	X	15
Nunavut (Hutchings)	0	1	0	0	0	0	X	X	1

Sheet 6	1	2	3	4	5	6	7	8	Final
Saskatchewan (Robson)	0	2	0	0	2	3	0	0	7
Northern Ontario (Larocque)	1	0	2	2	0	0	3	1	9

==== Draw 14 ====
Thursday, December 2, 7:30 pm

Sheet 1	1	2	3	4	5	6	7	8	Final
Manitoba (McCreanor)	0	0	0	2	0	1	0	0	3
Alberta (Steuber)	1	0	0	0	1	0	1	1	4

Sheet 2	1	2	3	4	5	6	7	8	Final
Northern Ontario (Larocque)	0	2	1	0	2	0	3	X	8
Newfoundland and Labrador (Walsh)	0	0	0	1	0	1	0	X	2

Sheet 3	1	2	3	4	5	6	7	8	Final
Quebec (Plouffe)	2	0	2	1	1	0	0	1	7
British Columbia (Shantz)	0	2	0	0	0	1	3	0	6

Sheet 4	1	2	3	4	5	6	7	8	Final
Saskatchewan (Robson)	0	0	0	0	1	0	2	X	3
Prince Edward Island (Bradley)	0	1	1	0	0	4	0	X	6

Sheet 5	1	2	3	4	5	6	7	8	Final
Nova Scotia (Thompson)	2	0	3	0	0	0	0	1	6
Ontario (Sheilds)	0	1	0	1	1	1	1	0	5

Sheet 6	1	2	3	4	5	6	7	8	Final
New Brunswick (Goodin)	1	0	0	2	2	0	0	X	5
Northwest Territories (Stabel)	0	1	0	0	0	1	1	X	3

=== Championship round ===
==== A Bracket ====
Qualifier 1
A1	Alberta	3
B4	Yukon	8
B4	Yukon	8
B2	New Brunswick	5
B2	New Brunswick	7
A3	Manitoba	4

Qualifier 2
B1	Ontario	5
A4	Prince Edward Island	2
B1	Ontario	6
B3	Nova Scotia	2
A2	Northern Ontario	3
B3	Nova Scotia	8

==== B Bracket ====
			Qualifier 3
			B3	Nova Scotia	7
A1	Alberta	5	A1	Alberta	5
A3	Manitoba	2

			Qualifier 4
			B2	New Brunswick	0
A4	Prince Edward Island	6	A2	Northern Ontario	8
A2	Northern Ontario	8

==== A Event ====
===== Semifinals =====
Friday, December 3, 9:00 am

Sheet 4	1	2	3	4	5	6	7	8	Final
Alberta (Steuber)	0	0	1	1	0	1	0	0	3
Yukon (Eby)	1	1	0	0	2	0	3	1	8

Sheet 5	1	2	3	4	5	6	7	8	Final
Northern Ontario (Larocque)	0	1	0	1	0	1	0	X	3
Nova Scotia (Thompson)	2	0	2	0	0	0	4	X	8

Sheet 6	1	2	3	4	5	6	7	8	Final
New Brunswick (Goodin)	0	0	0	4	0	3	0	X	7
Manitoba (McCreanor)	0	1	1	0	1	0	1	X	4

Friday, December 3, 12:30 pm

Sheet 2	1	2	3	4	5	6	7	8	Final
Ontario (Sheilds)	0	0	2	0	2	1	0	X	5
Prince Edward Island (Bradley)	0	1	0	0	0	0	1	X	2

===== Finals =====
Friday, December 3, 12:30 pm

Sheet 1	1	2	3	4	5	6	7	8	Final
Yukon (Eby)	0	0	1	4	0	0	3	X	8
New Brunswick (Goodin)	0	1	0	0	3	1	0	X	5

Friday, December 3, 4:00 pm

Sheet 4	1	2	3	4	5	6	7	8	Final
Ontario (Sheilds)	1	2	0	1	1	1	0	X	6
Nova Scotia (Thompson)	0	0	1	0	0	0	1	X	2

==== B Event ====
===== Semifinals =====
Friday, December 3, 12:30 pm

Sheet 3	1	2	3	4	5	6	7	8	Final
Alberta (Steuber)	0	1	2	0	1	0	0	1	5
Manitoba (McCreanor)	0	0	0	2	0	0	0	0	2

Friday, December 3, 4:00 pm

Sheet 6	1	2	3	4	5	6	7	8	Final
Prince Edward Island (Bradley)	2	0	2	0	0	2	0	X	6
Northern Ontario (Larocque)	0	2	0	2	1	0	3	X	8

===== Finals =====
Friday, December 3, 7:30 pm

Sheet 1	1	2	3	4	5	6	7	8	Final
Nova Scotia (Thompson)	0	0	0	1	0	3	1	2	7
Alberta (Steuber)	2	1	1	0	1	0	0	0	5

Sheet 3	1	2	3	4	5	6	7	8	Final
New Brunswick (Goodin)	0	0	0	0	0	0	X	X	0
Northern Ontario (Larocque)	0	2	1	0	2	3	X	X	8

=== Playoffs ===
Semifinals
1	Yukon	1
4	Northern Ontario	7
2	Ontario	8
3	Nova Scotia	5

Final
4	Northern Ontario	7
2	Ontario	5

Bronze medal game
1	Yukon	3
3	Nova Scotia	5

==== Semifinals ====
Saturday, December 4, 9:00 am

Sheet 4	1	2	3	4	5	6	7	8	Final
Ontario (Sheilds)	2	2	0	1	0	0	2	1	8
Nova Scotia (Thompson)	0	0	1	0	2	2	0	0	5

Sheet 6	1	2	3	4	5	6	7	8	Final
Yukon (Eby)	0	0	1	0	0	0	0	X	1
Northern Ontario (Larocque)	0	0	0	2	0	1	4	X	7

==== Bronze medal game ====
Saturday, December 4, 2:00 pm

Sheet 3	1	2	3	4	5	6	7	8	Final
Nova Scotia (Thompson)	1	0	1	0	1	0	0	2	5
Yukon (Eby)	0	0	0	1	0	0	2	0	3

==== Gold medal game ====
Saturday, December 4, 2:00 pm

Sheet 1	1	2	3	4	5	6	7	8	9	Final
Northern Ontario (Larocque)	0	2	0	1	0	1	1	0	2	7
Ontario (Shields)	1	0	2	0	0	0	0	2	0	5
