= 2025 Canadian Curling Club Championships =

Canadian national curling championship edition

2025 Everest Canadian Curling Club Championships
- Host city: Winnipeg, Manitoba
- Arena: Granite Curling Club
- Dates: November 18–23
- Men's winner: British Columbia
- Curling club: Cranbrook CC, Cranbrook
- Skip: Mitch Young
- Third: Steve Tersmette
- Second: Blair Jarvis
- Lead: Kevin Hoglund
- Alternate: Matthew Reynolds
- Coach: Chris Summers
- Finalist: Newfoundland and Labrador (Noseworthy)
- Women's winner: Ontario
- Curling club: Rideau CC, Ottawa
- Skip: Lindsay Thorne
- Third: Melissa Gannon
- Second: Mychelle Zahab
- Lead: Emily Kelly
- Finalist: Quebec (Perron)

The 2025 Everest Canadian Curling Club Championships were held from November 18 to 23 at the Granite Curling Club in Winnipeg, Manitoba. The event is the Canadian championship for recreational or "club-level" curling, that is for curlers who are not currently playing at the high performance level.

== Men ==
=== Teams ===
The teams are listed as follows:

Team	Skip	Third	Second	Lead	Alternate	Club
Alberta	Sterling Hansen	Sean Morris	Aaron Sarafinchan	Brad Kokoroyanni		Calgary CC, Calgary
British Columbia	Mitch Young	Steve Tersmette	Blair Jarvis	Kevin Hoglund	Matthew Reynolds	Cranbrook CC, Cranbrook
Manitoba	Derrick Anderson	Justin Hoplock	Mitch Einarson	Chris Sigurdson		Gimli CC, Gimli
New Brunswick	Bob Sherrard	Bill Gates	Mike Martin	Danny MacDonald		Thistle-St. Andrews CC, Saint John
Newfoundland and Labrador	Mark Noseworthy	Steve Bragg	Andrew Manuel	John Sheppard		St. John's CC, St. John's
Northern Ontario	Jordan Chandler	Kyle Chandler	Ron McQuarrie	Jim Bickell		Little Current CC, Little Current
Northwest Territories	Donovan Arey	Melvin Sittichinli	Kevin McLeod	Glen Tingmiak		Inuvik CC, Inuvik
Nova Scotia	Sebastien LeFort	Todd Mercer	Michael Garden	Nolan Drover	Devin George	Sydney CC, Sydney
Nunavut	Peter Mackey	Jeff Nadeau	Peter Van Strien	Jamie Gauthier		Iqaluit CC, Iqaluit
Ontario	Bryan Cochrane	Ryan Cochrane	Pierre Harvey	Paul Nooyen		Russell CC, Russell
Prince Edward Island	Dennis Watts	Erik Brodersen	Shane MacDonald	Andrew MacDougall		Cornwall CC, Cornwall
Quebec	Ghislain Doyon	Sonny Melancon	Serge St-Germain	Vincent Raymond		Club Sports Belvedère, Val-d’Or
Saskatchewan	Dean Grindheim	Darren Camm	Tyler Camm	Mark Steckler		Sutherland CC, Saskatoon
Yukon	Dustin Mikkelsen	Alex Peech	Brandon Hagen	Matt Johnston	Jared Zeeben	Whitehorse CC, Whitehorse

=== Round robin standings ===
Final Round Robin Standings

Key
Teams to Championship Round

Pool A	Skip	W	L	W–L	LSD
Alberta	Sterling Hansen	6	0	–	41.07
Ontario	Bryan Cochrane	4	2	1–0	52.98
Newfoundland and Labrador	Mark Noseworthy	4	2	0–1	57.27
Yukon	Dustin Mikkelsen	3	3	1–0	60.93
Saskatchewan	Dean Grindheim	3	3	0–1	47.22
New Brunswick	Bob Sherrard	1	5	–	73.10
Northwest Territories	Donovan Arey	0	6	–	104.65

Pool B	Skip	W	L	W–L	LSD
British Columbia	Mitch Young	5	1	1–0	52.34
Prince Edward Island	Dennis Watts	5	1	0–1	47.30
Nova Scotia	Sebastien LeFort	4	2	–	53.36
Northern Ontario	Jordan Chandler	3	3	–	48.79
Manitoba	Derrick Anderson	2	4	1–0	37.01
Quebec	Ghislain Doyon	2	4	0–1	67.27
Nunavut	Peter Mackey	0	6	–	72.24

=== Round robin results ===
All draws are listed in Central Time (UTC−06:00).

==== Draw 1 ====
Monday, November 18, 3:00 pm

Sheet A	1	2	3	4	5	6	7	8	Final
Nova Scotia (LeFort) 🔨	4	0	1	0	1	1	1	X	8
Nunavut (Mackey)	0	2	0	1	0	0	0	X	3

Sheet B	1	2	3	4	5	6	7	8	Final
Alberta (Hansen) 🔨	0	1	0	2	0	3	X	X	6
Northwest Territories (Arey)	1	0	1	0	1	0	X	X	3

Sheet C	1	2	3	4	5	6	7	8	Final
New Brunswick (Sherrard) 🔨	1	1	0	0	1	1	0	0	4
Yukon (Mikkelsen)	0	0	2	1	0	0	0	2	5

Sheet D	1	2	3	4	5	6	7	8	Final
Ontario (Cochrane) 🔨	1	0	0	2	0	2	1	3	9
Newfoundland and Labrador (Noseworthy)	0	1	1	0	2	0	0	0	4

Sheet E	1	2	3	4	5	6	7	8	Final
British Columbia (Young) 🔨	0	1	0	2	0	0	0	0	3
Northern Ontario (Chandler)	0	0	2	0	0	1	0	3	6

Sheet F	1	2	3	4	5	6	7	8	Final
Quebec (Doyon)	0	1	1	0	0	0	X	X	2
Prince Edward Island (Watts) 🔨	3	0	0	2	2	1	X	X	8

==== Draw 3 ====
Wednesday, November 19, 8:30 am

Sheet A	1	2	3	4	5	6	7	8	Final
Quebec (Doyon) 🔨	2	0	1	0	0	0	1	0	4
British Columbia (Young)	0	2	0	0	0	2	0	1	5

Sheet B	1	2	3	4	5	6	7	8	Final
Ontario (Cochrane) 🔨	2	0	1	0	3	1	0	1	8
New Brunswick (Sherrard)	0	2	0	1	0	0	2	0	5

Sheet C	1	2	3	4	5	6	7	8	Final
Newfoundland and Labrador (Noseworthy)	0	1	1	0	1	0	0	X	3
Alberta (Hansen) 🔨	1	0	0	2	0	5	1	X	9

Sheet D	1	2	3	4	5	6	7	8	Final
Prince Edward Island (Watts)	1	0	2	1	0	4	0	X	8
Nova Scotia (LeFort) 🔨	0	1	0	0	1	0	2	X	4

Sheet E	1	2	3	4	5	6	7	8	Final
Nunavut (Mackey)	1	0	1	0	0	1	0	X	3
Manitoba (Anderson) 🔨	0	3	0	0	3	0	2	X	8

Sheet F	1	2	3	4	5	6	7	8	Final
Northwest Territories (Arey)	0	0	0	0	2	0	X	X	2
Saskatchewan (Grindheim) 🔨	4	1	3	2	0	3	X	X	13

==== Draw 5 ====
Wednesday, November 19, 4:30 pm

Sheet A	1	2	3	4	5	6	7	8	Final
Northwest Territories (Arey)	0	0	0	0	1	0	X	X	1
Newfoundland and Labrador (Noseworthy) 🔨	0	3	4	4	0	3	X	X	14

Sheet B	1	2	3	4	5	6	7	8	Final
Manitoba (Anderson)	0	0	2	0	1	0	0	X	3
Northern Ontario (Chandler) 🔨	2	0	0	4	0	1	1	X	8

Sheet C	1	2	3	4	5	6	7	8	Final
Nunavut (Mackey) 🔨	0	2	0	0	0	0	X	X	2
Prince Edward Island (Watts)	4	0	2	3	1	1	X	X	11

Sheet D	1	2	3	4	5	6	7	8	Final
Saskatchewan (Grindheim)	0	0	1	0	0	2	0	X	3
Yukon (Mikkelsen) 🔨	2	3	0	1	1	0	3	X	10

Sheet E	1	2	3	4	5	6	7	8	Final
Alberta (Hansen) 🔨	1	1	0	3	0	1	1	X	7
New Brunswick (Sherrard)	0	0	2	0	1	0	0	X	3

Sheet F	1	2	3	4	5	6	7	8	Final
Nova Scotia (LeFort)	2	0	0	0	1	0	0	0	3
British Columbia (Young) 🔨	0	0	0	1	0	1	1	1	4

==== Draw 7 ====
Thursday, November 20, 8:30 am

Sheet A	1	2	3	4	5	6	7	8	Final
Northern Ontario (Chandler) 🔨	0	2	1	2	0	1	0	0	6
Quebec (Doyon)	0	0	0	0	5	0	1	1	7

Sheet B	1	2	3	4	5	6	7	8	Final
Yukon (Mikkelsen)	1	1	1	0	0	1	1	0	5
Ontario (Cochrane) 🔨	0	0	0	4	1	0	0	2	7

Sheet C	1	2	3	4	5	6	7	8	Final
British Columbia (Young) 🔨	5	0	0	0	3	1	X	X	9
Nunavut (Mackey)	0	1	0	0	0	0	X	X	1

Sheet D	1	2	3	4	5	6	7	8	Final
New Brunswick (Sherrard) 🔨	4	0	0	1	0	4	X	X	9
Northwest Territories (Arey)	0	0	1	0	0	0	X	X	1

Sheet E	1	2	3	4	5	6	7	8	Final
Newfoundland and Labrador (Noseworthy) 🔨	0	0	2	0	0	2	0	1	5
Saskatchewan (Grindheim)	0	0	0	2	1	0	1	0	4

Sheet F	1	2	3	4	5	6	7	8	9	Final
Prince Edward Island (Watts) 🔨	0	1	0	2	1	3	0	0	1	8
Manitoba (Anderson)	1	0	1	0	0	0	4	1	0	7

==== Draw 9 ====
Thursday, November 20, 4:30 pm

Sheet A	1	2	3	4	5	6	7	8	Final
Newfoundland and Labrador (Noseworthy) 🔨	2	0	2	0	3	1	0	X	8
New Brunswick (Sherrard)	0	1	0	2	0	0	1	X	4

Sheet B	1	2	3	4	5	6	7	8	Final
Prince Edward Island (Watts)	0	0	0	1	2	1	0	0	4
British Columbia (Young) 🔨	1	1	0	0	0	0	1	2	5

Sheet C	1	2	3	4	5	6	7	8	9	Final
Saskatchewan (Grindheim) 🔨	1	0	1	0	0	1	0	2	1	6
Ontario (Cochrane)	0	2	0	1	1	0	1	0	0	5

Sheet D	1	2	3	4	5	6	7	8	Final
Yukon (Mikkelsen) 🔨	2	0	0	0	0	2	0	0	4
Alberta (Hansen)	0	1	1	1	1	0	0	1	5

Sheet E	1	2	3	4	5	6	7	8	Final
Northern Ontario (Chandler)	0	0	0	2	0	3	0	0	5
Nova Scotia (LeFort) 🔨	1	1	1	0	1	0	3	1	8

Sheet F	1	2	3	4	5	6	7	8	Final
Manitoba (Anderson) 🔨	0	0	0	3	1	1	0	X	5
Quebec (Doyon)	0	0	0	0	0	0	1	X	1

==== Draw 11 ====
Friday, November 21, 8:30 am

Sheet A	1	2	3	4	5	6	7	8	9	Final
Alberta (Hansen) 🔨	1	0	0	1	0	1	0	1	2	6
Ontario (Cochrane)	0	0	0	0	2	0	2	0	0	4

Sheet B	1	2	3	4	5	6	7	8	Final
New Brunswick (Sherrard)	0	0	0	1	0	1	X	X	2
Saskatchewan (Grindheim) 🔨	2	1	2	0	4	0	X	X	9

Sheet C	1	2	3	4	5	6	7	8	Final
Nova Scotia (LeFort)	0	0	2	0	0	2	0	1	5
Quebec (Doyon) 🔨	1	0	0	1	1	0	0	0	3

Sheet D	1	2	3	4	5	6	7	8	Final
British Columbia (Young) 🔨	1	0	0	1	0	1	3	X	6
Manitoba (Anderson)	0	1	0	0	0	0	0	X	1

Sheet E	1	2	3	4	5	6	7	8	Final
Northwest Territories (Arey)	0	0	0	0	2	1	0	X	3
Yukon (Mikkelsen) 🔨	1	2	1	3	0	0	2	X	9

Sheet F	1	2	3	4	5	6	7	8	Final
Nunavut (Mackey)	0	1	1	1	1	0	0	X	4
Northern Ontario (Chandler) 🔨	3	0	0	0	0	3	2	X	8

==== Draw 13 ====
Friday, November 21, 4:30 pm

Sheet A	1	2	3	4	5	6	7	8	Final
Manitoba (Anderson) 🔨	0	3	0	0	0	1	0	X	4
Nova Scotia (LeFort)	1	0	2	1	2	0	5	X	11

Sheet B	1	2	3	4	5	6	7	8	Final
Quebec (Doyon) 🔨	1	0	3	0	5	1	X	X	10
Nunavut (Mackey)	0	1	0	1	0	0	X	X	2

Sheet C	1	2	3	4	5	6	7	8	Final
Ontario (Cochrane) 🔨	2	6	0	3	0	1	X	X	12
Northwest Territories (Arey)	0	0	1	0	1	0	X	X	2

Sheet D	1	2	3	4	5	6	7	8	Final
Northern Ontario (Chandler) 🔨	2	0	1	1	0	0	1	0	5
Prince Edward Island (Watts)	0	2	0	0	1	0	0	3	6

Sheet E	1	2	3	4	5	6	7	8	Final
Yukon (Mikkelsen)	0	1	0	1	0	2	0	1	5
Newfoundland and Labrador (Noseworthy) 🔨	1	0	5	0	1	0	1	0	8

Sheet F	1	2	3	4	5	6	7	8	Final
Saskatchewan (Grindheim) 🔨	0	1	0	1	0	1	3	0	6
Alberta (Hansen)	2	0	2	0	1	0	0	2	7

=== Championship round ===
==== A Bracket ====
Qualifier 1
A1	Alberta	5
B4	Northern Ontario	3
A1	Alberta	3
A2	Ontario	9
A2	Ontario	6
B3	Nova Scotia	3

Qualifier 2
B1	British Columbia	10
A4	Yukon	0
B1	British Columbia	3
B2	Prince Edward Island	6
B2	Prince Edward Island	12
A3	Newfoundland and Labrador	2

==== B Bracket ====
			Qualifier 3
			A1	Alberta	4
A4	Yukon	4	A3	Newfoundland and Labrador	8
A3	Newfoundland and Labrador	5

			Qualifier 4
			B1	British Columbia	5
B4	Northern Ontario	4	B3	Nova Scotia	3
B3	Nova Scotia	9

==== A Event ====
===== Semifinals =====
Saturday, November 22, 8:30 am

Sheet A	1	2	3	4	5	6	7	8	Final
Prince Edward Island (Watts) 🔨	1	4	0	4	2	1	X	X	12
Newfoundland and Labrador (Noseworthy)	0	0	2	0	0	0	X	X	2

Sheet B	1	2	3	4	5	6	7	8	Final
Ontario (Cochrane) 🔨	1	0	2	0	2	1	0	X	6
Nova Scotia (LeFort)	0	0	0	1	0	0	2	X	3

Sheet C	1	2	3	4	5	6	7	8	9	Final
Alberta (Hansen) 🔨	1	1	0	0	0	1	0	0	2	5
Northern Ontario (Chandler)	0	0	0	0	1	0	1	1	0	3

Saturday, November 22, 12:30 pm

Sheet F	1	2	3	4	5	6	7	8	Final
British Columbia (Young)	2	0	3	1	1	3	X	X	10
Yukon (Mikkelsen) 🔨	0	0	0	0	0	0	X	X	0

===== Finals =====
Saturday, November 22, 12:30 pm

Sheet D	1	2	3	4	5	6	7	8	Final
Alberta (Hansen) 🔨	0	3	0	0	0	0	X	X	3
Ontario (Cochrane)	1	0	2	3	1	2	X	X	9

Saturday, November 22, 4:30 pm

Sheet E	1	2	3	4	5	6	7	8	Final
British Columbia (Young) 🔨	0	2	0	0	0	1	0	X	3
Prince Edward Island (Watts)	1	0	0	3	0	0	2	X	6

==== B Event ====
===== Semifinals =====
Saturday, November 22, 4:30 pm

Sheet B	1	2	3	4	5	6	7	8	Final
Yukon (Mikkelsen) 🔨	0	0	1	0	1	1	1	0	4
Newfoundland and Labrador (Noseworthy)	0	2	0	1	0	0	0	2	5

Sheet D	1	2	3	4	5	6	7	8	Final
Northern Ontario (Chandler)	1	0	2	0	1	0	0	X	4
Nova Scotia (LeFort) 🔨	0	3	0	3	0	1	2	X	9

===== Finals =====
Saturday, November 22, 8:00 pm

Sheet B	1	2	3	4	5	6	7	8	Final
British Columbia (Young) 🔨	1	0	1	0	1	1	0	1	5
Nova Scotia (LeFort)	0	1	0	1	0	0	1	0	3

Sheet C	1	2	3	4	5	6	7	8	Final
Alberta (Hansen) 🔨	1	0	0	2	0	0	1	0	4
Newfoundland and Labrador (Noseworthy)	0	1	0	0	4	1	0	2	8

=== Playoffs ===
Semifinals
Q1	Ontario	7
Q4	British Columbia	8
Q2	Prince Edward Island	5
Q3	Newfoundland and Labrador	7

Gold medal game
Q4	British Columbia	8
Q3	Newfoundland and Labrador	4
Bronze medal game
Q1	Ontario	9
Q2	Prince Edward Island	5

==== Semifinals ====
Sunday, November 23, 10:00 am

Sheet B	1	2	3	4	5	6	7	8	Final
Prince Edward Island (Watts) 🔨	1	2	0	1	0	0	1	0	5
Newfoundland and Labrador (Noseworthy)	0	0	1	0	1	2	0	3	7

Sheet C	1	2	3	4	5	6	7	8	Final
Ontario (Cochrane)	0	0	2	0	3	0	2	0	7
British Columbia (Young) 🔨	0	1	0	4	0	2	0	1	8

==== Bronze medal game ====
Sunday, November 23, 3:00 pm

Sheet D	1	2	3	4	5	6	7	8	Final
Ontario (Cochrane)	0	2	0	1	1	0	3	2	9
Prince Edward Island (Watts) 🔨	2	0	1	0	0	2	0	0	5

==== Gold medal game ====
Sunday, November 23, 3:00 pm

Sheet F	1	2	3	4	5	6	7	8	Final
British Columbia (Young) 🔨	2	0	0	0	1	1	2	2	8
Newfoundland and Labrador (Noseworthy)	0	3	1	0	0	0	0	0	4

== Women ==
=== Teams ===
The teams are listed as follows:

Team	Skip	Third	Second	Lead	Alternate	Club
Alberta	Michelle Hartwell	Lisa Johnson	Brittany Zelmer	Shauna Nordstrom	Tori Hartwell	Thistle CC, Edmonton
British Columbia	Carley Sandwith-Craig (Fourth)	Marika Van Osch	Kesa Woodward (Skip)	Megan Montgomery	Kalia MacKenzie	Duncan CC, Duncan
Manitoba	Lindsay Warkentin	Susan Baleja	Tricia McLeod	Carlene Strand	Ashleigh Gusberti	Fort Garry CC, Winnipeg
New Brunswick	Sarah Gaines	Hannah Williams	Gabrielle King	Ashley Coughlan		Gage G&CC, Oromocto
Newfoundland and Labrador	Marcie Brown	Kathy Coles	Sheryl Ryan	Robyn Edwards		Carol CC, Labrador City
Northern Ontario	Mackenzie Daley	Joanne Forget	Jami Bowman	Taylor Patterson		North Bay Granite Club, North Bay
Northwest Territories	Carina McKay-Saturnino	Brooke Smith	Kate Jarvis	Jenna McDonald		Inuvik CC, Inuvik
Nova Scotia	Jennifer Connell	Bailey Lonergan	Claire Belliveau	Sarah Kennie	Lisa Willse	Berwick CC, Berwick
Nunavut	Geneva Chislett	Robyn Mackey	Alison Taylor	Lisa Kirk		Iqaluit CC, Iqaluit
Ontario	Lindsay Thorne	Melissa Gannon	Emily Kelly	Mychelle Zahab		Rideau CC, Ottawa
Prince Edward Island	Melissa Morrow	Darcee Birch	Michelle MacIntyre	Kacey Gauthie		Crapaud CC, Crapaud
Quebec	Miriam Perron	Marie-Laurence Bergeron	Véronique Gingras	Marie-Pier Ayotte	Manon Morin	CC Trois-Rivières, Trois-Rivières
Saskatchewan	Patricia Bibby	Jaime Smith-Windsor	Melanie Heleta	Donna Campbell	Linda Bjork	Prince Albert G&CC, Prince Albert
Yukon	Darlene Gammel	Claudia Beer	Tamar Vandenberghe	Frances Taylor		Whitehorse CC, Whitehorse

=== Round robin standings ===
Final Round Robin Standings

Key
Teams to Championship Round

Pool A	Skip	W	L	W-L	LSD
Ontario	Lindsay Thorne	5	1	–	56.81
Quebec	Miriam Perron	4	2	1–0	57.43
Newfoundland and Labrador	Marcie Brown	4	2	0–1	75.63
New Brunswick	Sarah Gaines	3	3	1–0	32.91
Nova Scotia	Jennifer Connell	3	3	0–1	89.40
Manitoba	Lindsay Warkentin	2	4	–	45.31
Northwest Territories	Carina McKay-Saturnino	0	6	–	95.58

Pool B	Skip	W	L	W-L	LSD
British Columbia	Kesa Woodward	5	1	–	65.70
Saskatchewan	Patricia Bibby	4	2	1–0	85.92
Northern Ontario	Mackenzie Daley	4	2	0–1	39.00
Alberta	Michelle Hartwell	3	3	1–0	90.70
Prince Edward Island	Melissa Morrow	3	3	0–1	62.83
Nunavut	Geneva Chislett	1	5	1–0	109.82
Yukon	Darlene Gammel	1	5	0–1	64.70

=== Round robin results ===
All draws are listed in Central Time (UTC−06:00).

==== Draw 2 ====
Monday, November 18, 8:00 pm

Sheet A	1	2	3	4	5	6	7	8	Final
Alberta (Hartwell)	0	2	0	2	2	2	X	X	8
Nunavut (Chislett) 🔨	1	0	0	0	0	0	X	X	1

Sheet B	1	2	3	4	5	6	7	8	Final
Quebec (Perron)	1	0	0	1	0	0	4	0	6
New Brunswick (Gaines) 🔨	0	1	3	0	1	1	0	1	7

Sheet C	1	2	3	4	5	6	7	8	Final
Nova Scotia (Connell)	0	0	3	0	1	0	4	2	10
Manitoba (Warkentin) 🔨	0	2	0	4	0	2	0	0	8

Sheet D	1	2	3	4	5	6	7	8	9	Final
British Columbia (Woodward)	0	0	2	1	0	1	1	0	0	5
Northern Ontario (Daley) 🔨	0	2	0	0	1	0	0	2	1	6

Sheet E	1	2	3	4	5	6	7	8	Final
Northwest Territories (McKay-Saturnino)	0	1	0	2	0	2	1	X	6
Newfoundland and Labrador (Brown) 🔨	2	0	5	0	3	0	0	X	10

Sheet F	1	2	3	4	5	6	7	8	Final
Prince Edward Island (Morrow)	1	1	0	3	0	2	3	X	10
Yukon (Gammel) 🔨	0	0	1	0	1	0	0	X	2

==== Draw 4 ====
Wednesday, November 19, 12:30 pm

Sheet A	1	2	3	4	5	6	7	8	Final
Nunavut (Chislett)	0	0	0	0	2	0	X	X	2
Saskatchewan (Bibby) 🔨	2	5	3	2	0	3	X	X	15

Sheet B	1	2	3	4	5	6	7	8	Final
New Brunswick (Gaines)	0	0	0	1	0	1	0	X	2
Ontario (Thorne) 🔨	1	0	1	0	1	0	1	X	4

Sheet C	1	2	3	4	5	6	7	8	Final
Newfoundland and Labrador (Brown)	0	0	0	1	2	0	1	X	4
Quebec (Perron) 🔨	0	4	1	0	0	4	0	X	9

Sheet D	1	2	3	4	5	6	7	8	Final
Yukon (Gammel) 🔨	2	0	0	1	0	0	1	X	4
Alberta (Hartwell)	0	3	1	0	1	1	0	X	6

Sheet E	1	2	3	4	5	6	7	8	Final
Prince Edward Island (Morrow) 🔨	2	0	0	1	0	0	2	X	5
British Columbia (Woodward)	0	2	3	0	1	2	0	X	8

Sheet F	1	2	3	4	5	6	7	8	Final
Northwest Territories (McKay-Saturnino) 🔨	1	0	0	0	1	0	1	X	3
Nova Scotia (Connell)	0	0	2	3	0	2	0	X	7

==== Draw 6 ====
Wednesday, November 19, 8:00 pm

Sheet A	1	2	3	4	5	6	7	8	Final
Ontario (Thorne)	0	2	1	0	0	0	3	2	8
Manitoba (Warkentin) 🔨	1	0	0	1	1	2	0	0	5

Sheet B	1	2	3	4	5	6	7	8	Final
Saskatchewan (Bibby)	1	0	0	3	0	1	1	X	6
Northern Ontario (Daley) 🔨	0	3	1	0	0	0	0	X	4

Sheet C	1	2	3	4	5	6	7	8	Final
Nunavut (Chislett)	2	2	1	0	4	0	0	X	9
Yukon (Gammel) 🔨	0	0	0	1	0	3	2	X	6

Sheet D	1	2	3	4	5	6	7	8	9	Final
New Brunswick (Gaines)	0	2	0	1	0	0	1	2	0	6
Newfoundland and Labrador (Brown) 🔨	1	0	1	0	1	3	0	0	2	8

Sheet E	1	2	3	4	5	6	7	8	Final
Quebec (Perron) 🔨	2	0	2	0	1	0	5	X	10
Nova Scotia (Connell)	0	1	0	1	0	2	0	X	4

Sheet F	1	2	3	4	5	6	7	8	Final
Alberta (Hartwell)	0	2	0	0	1	0	0	X	3
British Columbia (Woodward) 🔨	1	0	0	1	0	4	2	X	8

==== Draw 8 ====
Thursday, November 20, 12:30 pm

Sheet A	1	2	3	4	5	6	7	8	Final
Northern Ontario (Daley)	0	2	2	0	1	0	1	X	6
Prince Edward Island (Morrow) 🔨	0	0	0	1	0	1	0	X	2

Sheet B	1	2	3	4	5	6	7	8	Final
Manitoba (Warkentin)	1	0	2	2	5	1	X	X	11
Northwest Territories (McKay-Saturnino) 🔨	0	1	0	0	0	0	X	X	1

Sheet C	1	2	3	4	5	6	7	8	Final
British Columbia (Woodward) 🔨	1	2	1	0	2	1	2	X	9
Nunavut (Chislett)	0	0	0	2	0	0	0	X	2

Sheet D	1	2	3	4	5	6	7	8	Final
Nova Scotia (Connell)	0	3	0	0	0	1	2	0	6
New Brunswick (Gaines) 🔨	2	0	0	3	1	0	0	3	9

Sheet E	1	2	3	4	5	6	7	8	Final
Yukon (Gammel) 🔨	2	0	1	1	0	0	0	0	4
Saskatchewan (Bibby)	0	1	0	0	1	1	2	2	7

Sheet F	1	2	3	4	5	6	7	8	Final
Newfoundland and Labrador (Brown)	0	0	0	0	0	0	X	X	0
Ontario (Thorne) 🔨	0	1	1	1	1	3	X	X	7

==== Draw 10 ====
Thursday, November 20, 8:00 pm

Sheet A	1	2	3	4	5	6	7	8	Final
Newfoundland and Labrador (Brown) 🔨	0	2	0	0	1	3	2	X	8
Nova Scotia (Connell)	1	0	0	2	0	0	0	X	3

Sheet B	1	2	3	4	5	6	7	8	Final
Yukon (Gammel)	0	1	0	0	0	0	X	X	1
British Columbia (Woodward) 🔨	2	0	2	1	3	2	X	X	10

Sheet C	1	2	3	4	5	6	7	8	Final
Ontario (Thorne) 🔨	0	2	0	0	0	2	1	0	5
Northwest Territories (McKay-Saturnino)	0	0	1	0	0	0	0	2	3

Sheet D	1	2	3	4	5	6	7	8	Final
Saskatchewan (Bibby)	2	0	0	0	0	1	0	2	5
Prince Edward Island (Morrow) 🔨	0	1	1	1	1	0	2	0	6

Sheet E	1	2	3	4	5	6	7	8	Final
Manitoba (Warkentin) 🔨	0	2	0	0	0	1	1	1	5
Quebec (Perron)	0	0	3	2	1	0	0	0	6

Sheet F	1	2	3	4	5	6	7	8	Final
Northern Ontario (Daley) 🔨	0	2	1	3	1	0	0	3	10
Alberta (Hartwell)	2	0	0	0	0	2	2	0	6

==== Draw 12 ====
Friday, November 21, 12:30 pm

Sheet A	1	2	3	4	5	6	7	8	Final
Nova Scotia (Connell)	0	0	0	1	1	0	2	1	5
Ontario (Thorne) 🔨	0	0	2	0	0	2	0	0	4

Sheet B	1	2	3	4	5	6	7	8	Final
British Columbia (Woodward)	0	3	0	0	1	1	2	1	8
Saskatchewan (Bibby) 🔨	0	0	1	2	0	0	0	0	3

Sheet C	1	2	3	4	5	6	7	8	Final
Alberta (Hartwell) 🔨	2	0	2	2	0	0	1	X	7
Prince Edward Island (Morrow)	0	3	0	0	1	0	0	X	4

Sheet D	1	2	3	4	5	6	7	8	Final
Quebec (Perron) 🔨	1	2	0	1	0	1	1	X	6
Northwest Territories (McKay-Saturnino)	0	0	0	0	1	0	0	X	1

Sheet E	1	2	3	4	5	6	7	8	Final
New Brunswick (Gaines) 🔨	2	0	0	0	1	0	2	X	5
Manitoba (Warkentin)	0	3	0	1	0	3	0	X	7

Sheet F	1	2	3	4	5	6	7	8	Final
Nunavut (Chislett)	1	0	3	1	0	2	0	0	7
Northern Ontario (Daley) 🔨	0	2	0	0	2	0	1	3	8

==== Draw 14 ====
Friday, November 21, 8:00 pm

Sheet A	1	2	3	4	5	6	7	8	Final
Saskatchewan (Bibby) 🔨	1	2	1	1	0	2	X	X	7
Alberta (Hartwell)	0	0	0	0	0	0	X	X	0

Sheet B	1	2	3	4	5	6	7	8	Final
Prince Edward Island (Morrow)	1	1	2	0	2	0	0	X	6
Nunavut (Chislett) 🔨	0	0	0	1	0	0	1	X	2

Sheet C	1	2	3	4	5	6	7	8	Final
Northwest Territories (McKay-Saturnino)	0	2	0	0	1	0	0	X	3
New Brunswick (Gaines) 🔨	4	0	1	1	0	2	2	X	10

Sheet D	1	2	3	4	5	6	7	8	Final
Ontario (Thorne)	0	3	0	0	0	2	0	1	6
Quebec (Perron) 🔨	1	0	1	1	0	0	1	0	4

Sheet E	1	2	3	4	5	6	7	8	Final
Northern Ontario (Daley)	1	0	0	0	1	0	0	X	2
Yukon (Gammel) 🔨	0	3	0	1	0	2	1	X	7

Sheet F	1	2	3	4	5	6	7	8	Final
Manitoba (Warkentin) 🔨	1	0	2	0	0	0	2	X	5
Newfoundland and Labrador (Brown)	0	2	0	1	4	2	0	X	9

=== Championship round ===
==== A Bracket ====
Qualifier 1
A1	Ontario	4
B4	Alberta	5
B4	Alberta	9
A2	Quebec	1
A2	Quebec	7
B3	Northern Ontario	6

Qualifier 2
B1	British Columbia	3
A4	New Brunswick	6
A4	New Brunswick	4
A3	Newfoundland and Labrador	2
B2	Saskatchewan	7
A3	Newfoundland and Labrador	8

==== B Bracket ====
			Qualifier 3
			A2	Quebec	12
B1	British Columbia	8	B2	Saskatchewan	4
B2	Saskatchewan	10

			Qualifier 4
			A3	Newfoundland and Labrador	2
A1	Ontario	8	A1	Ontario	9
B3	Northern Ontario	2

==== A Event ====
===== Semifinals =====
Saturday, November 22, 8:30 am

Sheet D	1	2	3	4	5	6	7	8	9	Final
Ontario (Thorne) 🔨	1	0	0	0	1	0	2	0	0	4
Alberta (Hartwell)	0	0	1	1	0	1	0	1	1	5

Sheet E	1	2	3	4	5	6	7	8	Final
Saskatchewan (Bibby)	0	2	1	0	0	0	3	1	7
Newfoundland and Labrador (Brown) 🔨	2	0	0	2	2	2	0	0	8

Sheet F	1	2	3	4	5	6	7	8	Final
Quebec (Perron) 🔨	0	1	1	0	0	0	3	2	7
Northern Ontario (Daley)	1	0	0	1	2	2	0	0	6

Saturday, November 22, 12:30 pm

Sheet C	1	2	3	4	5	6	7	8	Final
British Columbia (Woodward)	0	2	0	1	0	0	0	0	3
New Brunswick (Gaines) 🔨	0	0	1	0	1	2	1	1	6

===== Finals =====
Saturday, November 22, 12:30 pm

Sheet B	1	2	3	4	5	6	7	8	Final
Alberta (Hartwell) 🔨	2	2	1	0	1	3	X	X	9
Quebec (Perron)	0	0	0	1	0	0	X	X	1

Saturday, November 22, 4:30 pm

Sheet A	1	2	3	4	5	6	7	8	Final
New Brunswick (Gaines)	0	1	0	2	0	0	0	1	4
Newfoundland and Labrador (Brown) 🔨	0	0	1	0	0	0	1	0	2

==== B Event ====
===== Semifinals =====
Saturday, November 22, 4:30 pm

Sheet C	1	2	3	4	5	6	7	8	Final
Ontario (Thorne) 🔨	0	3	0	1	0	3	1	X	8
Northern Ontario (Daley)	0	0	1	0	1	0	0	X	2

Sheet F	1	2	3	4	5	6	7	8	9	Final
British Columbia (Woodward) 🔨	0	2	0	0	0	3	0	3	0	8
Saskatchewan (Bibby)	1	0	2	3	1	0	1	0	2	10

===== Finals =====
Saturday, November 22, 8:00 pm

Sheet D	1	2	3	4	5	6	7	8	Final
Quebec (Perron) 🔨	0	2	0	1	3	0	6	X	12
Saskatchewan (Bibby)	1	0	1	0	0	2	0	X	4

Sheet E	1	2	3	4	5	6	7	8	Final
Newfoundland and Labrador (Brown)	0	0	1	0	1	0	X	X	2
Ontario (Thorne) 🔨	0	3	0	3	0	3	X	X	9

=== Playoffs ===
Semifinals
Q1	Alberta	3
Q4	Ontario	4
Q2	New Brunswick	5
Q3	Quebec	8

Gold medal game
Q4	Ontario	7
Q3	Quebec	6
Bronze medal game
Q1	Alberta	4
Q2	New Brunswick	5

==== Semifinals ====
Sunday, November 23, 10:00 am

Sheet D	1	2	3	4	5	6	7	8	9	Final
New Brunswick (Gaines)	0	1	0	0	0	2	0	2	0	5
Quebec (Perron)	1	0	0	0	2	0	2	0	3	8

Sheet E	1	2	3	4	5	6	7	8	Final
Alberta (Hartwell)	0	1	0	0	1	0	1	0	3
Ontario (Thorne) 🔨	1	0	2	0	0	0	0	1	4

==== Bronze medal game ====
Sunday, November 23, 3:00 pm

Sheet B	1	2	3	4	5	6	7	8	Final
Alberta (Hartwell)	1	2	0	0	0	1	0	0	4
New Brunswick (Gaines) 🔨	0	0	1	1	0	0	2	1	5

==== Gold medal game ====
Sunday, November 23, 3:00 pm

Sheet C	1	2	3	4	5	6	7	8	Final
Ontario (Thorne) 🔨	0	1	0	1	0	4	0	1	7
Quebec (Perron)	0	0	1	0	2	0	3	0	6
