= Chatham Granite Club =

Curling club in Chatham, Ontario, Canada

- Club Logo 2016–Present
- Host club: 41 William Street North Chatham, Ontario, N7M 5K8

Information
- Established: 1862
- Sheets of ice: 5
- Rock colours: Red and Blue
- Website: www.chathamgraniteclub.org

The Chatham Granite Club is a historic 5-sheet curling club in Chatham, Ontario, Canada. It is located in downtown Chatham on William Street North.

== History ==
The Chatham Granite was founded in 1862 as the Chatham Curling Club. For the first 30 years, the club played on the Thames River. In 1892, they settled at the club's current location, and a new building was built in 1903. Artificial ice was installed in 1929 when the curling rink was remodeled into a skating, hockey and curling arena. In 1939, the club was renovated into just a curling rink. In 1965 a new arena structure was built out of British Columbia cedar, as it is seen today. In 1970 a new urethane pad under the ice was installed. In 1977 a new addition was completed at a cost of $180,000, locker rooms and the upstairs bar and lounge were enlarged by 15 feet. This allowed for the construction of a board room, a new bar, as well as a professional kitchen facility. The club has five sheets of curling ice, lockers on the main level and a lounge upstairs that was refurbished in 2017.

== Success ==
The Chatham Granite Club has sent two teams to the Brier, in 1949 and 1953 when Peter Gilbert won the Provincial championships. Peter Gilbert is the oldest curler to ever compete at the Brier, at the age of 73.

The club was the first winner of The Dominion Curling Club Championships (men's division) in 2009.

== Provincial championships ==
- 2015 – John Young Jr, Brett DeKoning, Graeme Robson, Jaques Van Bilsen: Silver Tankard Provincial Champions
- 2015 – Dale Kelly, Mark Patterson Ed De Schutter, Blair Willert: Silver Tankard Provincial Champions
- 2014 – John Young Jr., Ken Baute, Ben Curtis, Jaques Van Bilsen: Best Western Intermediate Men's
- 2012 – John Young Jr., Ed DeSchutter, Graeme Robson, Andrew Willemsma: Colts
- 2009 – Robert Stafford, Ben Curtis, Mark Patterson, Ed DeSchutter: Provincial and national curling club champions
- 1988 – Brian DeRooy, Bev Dekoning, Peter Dekoning, Eileen DeRooy: Mixed
- 1987 – Shirley Pilson, Mary Bagnell, Betty Standish, Olga Hladki: Women's Masters
- 1986 – Shirley Pilson, Mary Bagnell, Betty Standish, Olga Hladki: Women's Masters
- 1985 – Shirley Pilson, Mary Bagnell, Betty Standish, Olga Hladki: Women's Masters
- 1982 – Shirley Pilson, Mary Bagnell, Doris Cowan, Pat Jones: Women's Seniors
- 1975 – Shirley Pilson, Mary Bagnell, Dot DeKoning, Ruth Robertson: Women's Seniors
- 1953 – Peter Gilbert, Gordon Gilbert, Robert Gilbert, Jim Harrington: Men's
- 1949 – Peter Gilbert, Gordon Gilbert, Don Painter, John DeKoning: Men's
